= Harlaxton (disambiguation) =

Harlaxton may refer to:

- Harlaxton, a village in Lincolnshire, England
  - RAF Harlaxton, a former airfield nearby
  - Harlaxton Manor, a manor house
- Harlaxton, Queensland, a suburb of Toowoomba, Australia
  - Harlaxton House, a heritage-listed house
