= Philip Pearson-Gregory =

English cricketer

Personal information
- Full name: Philip John Sherwin Pearson Gregory
- Born: 26 March 1888; Harlaxton Manor, Lincolnshire, England
- Died: 12 June 1955 (aged 67); St Pancras, London, England
- Nickname: Born: Philip John Sherwin Pearson
- Batting: Right-handed
- Relatives: Thomas Pearson (father), Arthur Ridley (father-in-law)

Domestic team information
- Years: Team
- 1910 & 1914: Nottinghamshire

Career statistics
Competition	First-class
Matches	3
Runs scored	119
Batting average	59.50
100s/50s	–/1
Top score	71
Balls bowled	–
Wickets	–
Bowling average	–
5 wickets in innings	–
10 wickets in match	–
Best bowling	–
Catches/stumpings	3/–
- Source: Cricinfo, 3 October 2010

Philip John Sherwin Pearson-Gregory (26 March 1888 – 12 June 1955) was an English cricketer. Pearson-Gregory was a right-handed batsman. He was born at the manor house of Harlaxton Manor in Harlaxton, Lincolnshire. He was originally educated at Eton College before proceeding to Brasenose College, Oxford.

Pearson-Gregory made his first-class debut for Nottinghamshire against Middlesex in the 1910 County Championship. He next represented Nottinghamshire in the 1914 season, which was to be his last in first-class cricket. During that season he represented Nottinghamshire in 2 further first-class matches against Yorkshire and Sussex. In his 3 first-class matches, he scored 119 runs at a batting average of 59.50, with a single half century high score of 71.

Pearson-Gregory was referenced in 1937, then holding the title of Major. By this time he was a widower, his wife having been killed in a road accident in 1930, when he sold Harlaxton Manor to Violet Van der Elst who renamed the site Grantham Castle. Pearson-Gregory died at St Pancras, London on 6 June 1955.

== Family ==
His father Thomas played first-class cricket for Oxford University, the Marylebone Cricket Club and Middlesex. His father-in-law Arthur Ridley played first-class cricket for Oxford University, the Marylebone Cricket Club, Hampshire, Kent and Middlesex.
