= Thomas Pearson (cricketer) =

English cricketer

Thomas Sherwin Pearson-Gregory (20 June 1851 – 25 November 1935) was an English first-class cricketer active 1872–91 who played for Middlesex, Marylebone Cricket Club (MCC) and Oxford University.

Pearson was born in Barwell, Leicestershire, and educated at Rugby and Christ Church, Oxford. He inherited Harlaxton Manor in Lincolnshire on the death of Mrs Catherine Sherwin-Gregory, widow of his second cousin, in 1892 and changed his surname to Pearson-Gregory. He was a deputy lieutenant of Lincolnshire. He was High Sheriff of Lincolnshire in 1899. He died at Harlaxton. His brothers Hugo and Philip Pearson and his son Philip Pearson-Gregory were also cricketers.
