= Arthur Ridley =

English cricketer (1852–1916)

Personal information
- Full name: Arthur William Ridley
- Born: 11 September 1852; Hollington, Hampshire, England
- Died: 10 August 1916 (aged 63); Westminster, London, England
- Height: 6 ft 0 in (1.83 m)
- Batting: Right-handed
- Bowling: Right-arm underarm medium
- Role: Occasional wicket-keeper
- Relatives: Alfred Ridley (brother); Philip Pearson-Gregory (son-in-law)

Domestic team information
- Years: Team
- 1872–1875: Oxford University
- 1875–1882: Marylebone Cricket Club
- 1875–1878: Hampshire
- 1877: Kent
- 1882–1885: Middlesex

Career statistics
Competition	First-class
Matches	96
Runs scored	3,150
Batting average	20.19
100s/50s	4/11
Top score	136
Balls bowled	8,834
Wickets	224
Bowling average	15.06
5 wickets in innings	19
10 wickets in match	5
Best bowling	7/21
Catches/stumpings	79/2
- Source: Cricinfo, 1 March 2010

Arthur William Ridley (11 September 1852 – 10 August 1916) was an English first-class cricketer. An all-rounder, he was considered one of the finest and last proponents of underam 'lob' bowling. His first-class career began with Oxford University while he was a student at Christ Church, Oxford. He would play for a number of teams between 1872 and 1885, including Hampshire, the Marylebone Cricket Club (MCC) and Middlesex. In 96 first-class appaearances he scored 3,150 runs as a batsman, while with his lob bowling he took 224 wickets, claiming nineteen five wicket hauls. Outside of cricket, Ridley was a brewery director; this commitment had the effect of restricting his availability to play first-class cricket with greater regularity.

== Early life and education ==
The son of The Reverend Nicholas James Ridley, he was born in September 1852 at Hollington, Hampshire. He was educated at Eton College, where he played for the college cricket team in 1870 and 1871, notably scoring a century in the 1871 Eton v Harrow match at Lord's. At Eton, Ridley was also a single and doubles racquets champion. From Eton, he matriculated to Christ Church, Oxford. At Oxford, he made his debut in first-class cricket for Oxford University against the Marylebone Cricket Club (MCC) at Oxford in 1872, with Ridley playing five times for Oxford in 1872, and gaining his blue against Cambridge University in The University Match. During 1872 season, he played for the Gentlemen of the South against the Players of the South at The Oval in June, before playing for the MCC against Kent when they visited the St Lawrence Ground to partake in the Canterbury Cricket Week in August. He played three times for Oxford in 1873, a season in which he also played twice each for the Gentlemen in the Gentlemen v Players fixtures, and for the Gentlemen of the South against the Players of the North and the Players of the South. He played five times for Oxford in 1874, in addition to making two additional appearances for the Gentlemen against the Players.

Ridley captained Oxford in 1875, making five appearances as captain. He guided Oxford to victory in the 1875 University Match, when with Cambridge requiring 14 runs for victory with three wickets in hand, Ridley bought himself on to bowl his underarm lobs, taking the final three Cambridge wickets for the cost of 7 runs. For Oxford, he made eighteen first-class appearances, scoring 459 runs at an average of 18.36, with a highest score of 81. With his lob bowling, he took 63 wickets at a bowling average of 13.31; he claimed five wickets in an innings on three occasions, taking best figures of 6 for 80. Ridley played twice for the Gentlemen in 1875, and once for the MCC against Nottinghamshire. He also played two matches at the Canterbury Cricket Week in August, with his final match of the 1875 season coming for the Gentlemen of the South against the Players of the North.

== Post-varsity cricket ==
During the 1875 season, Ridley made his first appearance for Hampshire against Sussex at Hove. In 1876, he made five appearances for Hampshire, having marked success against Kent; against them at the Antelope Ground, he made a half century and took figures of 6 for 58 and 6 for 34, while in the return match at Faversham, he made a century (104 runs) and took figures of 5 for 52 and 5 for 61. The 1876 season was to be the most successful of his career, with his eleven first-class matches yielding him 585 runs at an average of 36.56, with three centuries. He also passed fifty wickets in a season for the only time, taking 53 at an average of 13.30. Ridley guest appeared for Kent as a given man by the MCC, when the MCC visited the St Lawrence Ground to partake in the 1877 Canterbury Cricket Week. He played for Hampshire until 1878, having made ten first-class appearances in his four seasons with Hampshire. A formidable bowler for Hampshire, he took 68 wickets at an average of 13.26; he claimed ten five wicket hauls and took ten-wickets in a match on four occasions.

In the period between 1878 and 1882 he played mostly for the Gentlemen and the MCC, amongst other ad-hoc first-class teams like I Zingari and his own personal eleven. Ridley began playing for Middlesex in 1882, owing to his residency in Central London. He debuted for Middlesex against Surrey at The Oval, with Ridley playing for Middlesex on sixteen occasions until 1885. He scored 527 runs for Middlesex, at an average of 20.26; he made his career-high first-class score for Middlesex, with 136 against Surrey in 1883. Throughout his career, he played extensively for the Gentlemen, making fourteen appearances in the Gentlemen v Players fixtures. In these, he scored 491 runs and made one century, in addition to taking 19 wickets. He would also appear for the MCC on fourteen occasions, scoring 329 runs and taking 21 wickets. He would play four times for the South in the North v South fixtures, with Ridley taking his career-best bowling figures of 7 for 21 in the 1877 fixture.

Characterised by Wisden as one of the best all-rounders of his time, he made 96 appearances in first-class cricket. Described by The Times as a "first-rate batsman" and by W. G. Grace as a good driver of the ball who made use of his 6 feet 0 inches (1.83 m) height to obtain great reach, he scored 3,150 runs at an average of 20.19, making four centuries. He was described by Carlaw as "one of the last of the great exponents of lob bowling", whilst Wisden listed him in the same vein as lob bowlers Edward Drake, Thomas Goodrich, Walter Money, William Rose, and V. E. Walker. His lob bowling claimed 224 wickets at a bowling average of 15.06, with him claiming five wickets in an innings on nineteen occasions and ten-wickets in a match on five. He was further noted by Wisden as being a "superb field" in whatever place he chose to fill", with Ridley often being utilised at point. He took 79 catches across his first-class career. In minor matches he also scored heavily, making two double-centuries for I Zingari in 1875 and 1881. Besides his playing career, Ridley would also serve on the committee of the MCC on three separate occasions: 1875 to 1882, 1884 to 1888, and 1889 to 1893.

== Family and personal life ==
Ridley's business commitments limited his availability to play first-class cricket on a more regular basis. He was the director of the Cannon Brewery Co. in London, an appointment he held until his death. He married Adriana Elizabeth Newton in 1882, with the couple having three daughters and two sons. Their eldest daughter Vera Emily, married Bertram Francis Gurdon, 2nd Baron Cranworth in 1903, while his second daughter, Marcia Emma, in married Philip John Sherwin Pearson Gregory in 1911; Gregory would also play cricket at first-class level. Ridley died suddenly at his Eaton Place residence in Westminster on 10 August 1916. His funeral took place on 14 August at Kingswood, Surrey. His brother, Alfred, was also a first-class cricketer. His paternal great-grandfather was the landowner and politician Sir Matthew White Ridley, 2nd Baronet.
