= Alfred Ridley =

English cricketer

Personal information
- Full name: Alfred Bayley Ridley
- Born: 14 December 1859; East Woodhay, Hampshire, England
- Died: 26 March 1898 (aged 38); Lambeth, London, England
- Batting: Right-handed
- Bowling: Right-arm roundarm fast
- Relatives: Arthur Ridley (brother)

Domestic team information
- Years: Team
- 1884–1885: Hampshire

Career statistics
Competition	First-class
Matches	2
Runs scored	43
Batting average	10.75
100s/50s	–/–
Top score	41
Balls bowled	76
Wickets	2
Bowling average	17.50
5 wickets in innings	–
10 wickets in match	–
Best bowling	2/30
Catches/stumpings	1/–
- Source: Cricinfo, 10 January 2010

Alfred Bayley Ridley (14 December 1849 – 26 March 1898) was an English first-class cricketer and British Army officer.

The son of The Reverend Nicholas James Ridley, he was born at in December 1849 at Hollington House in East Woodhay, Hampshire. He was educated at Eton College, before attending the Royal Military College, Sandhurst. He graduated from there as a second lieutenant into the King's Own Royal Regiment (Lancaster) in May 1878. He was promoted to lieutenant in May 1880, and shortly after served in the First Boer War. Ridley later played first-class cricket, making his debut for Hampshire against Kent at Southampton in 1884; the following year he made a second appearance against Derbyshire, in what was the second first-class match to be played at the newly constructed Northlands Road in Southampton. He scored 43 runs in these matches, in addition to taking two wickets. In the King's Own, he was promoted to captain in September 1886. Ridley died at London in March 1898, following a long illness. He was survived by his widow, Amy. His elder brother, Arthur, was also a first-class cricketer.
