= Harlaxton Manor =

Manor house located in Harlaxton, Lincolnshire, England

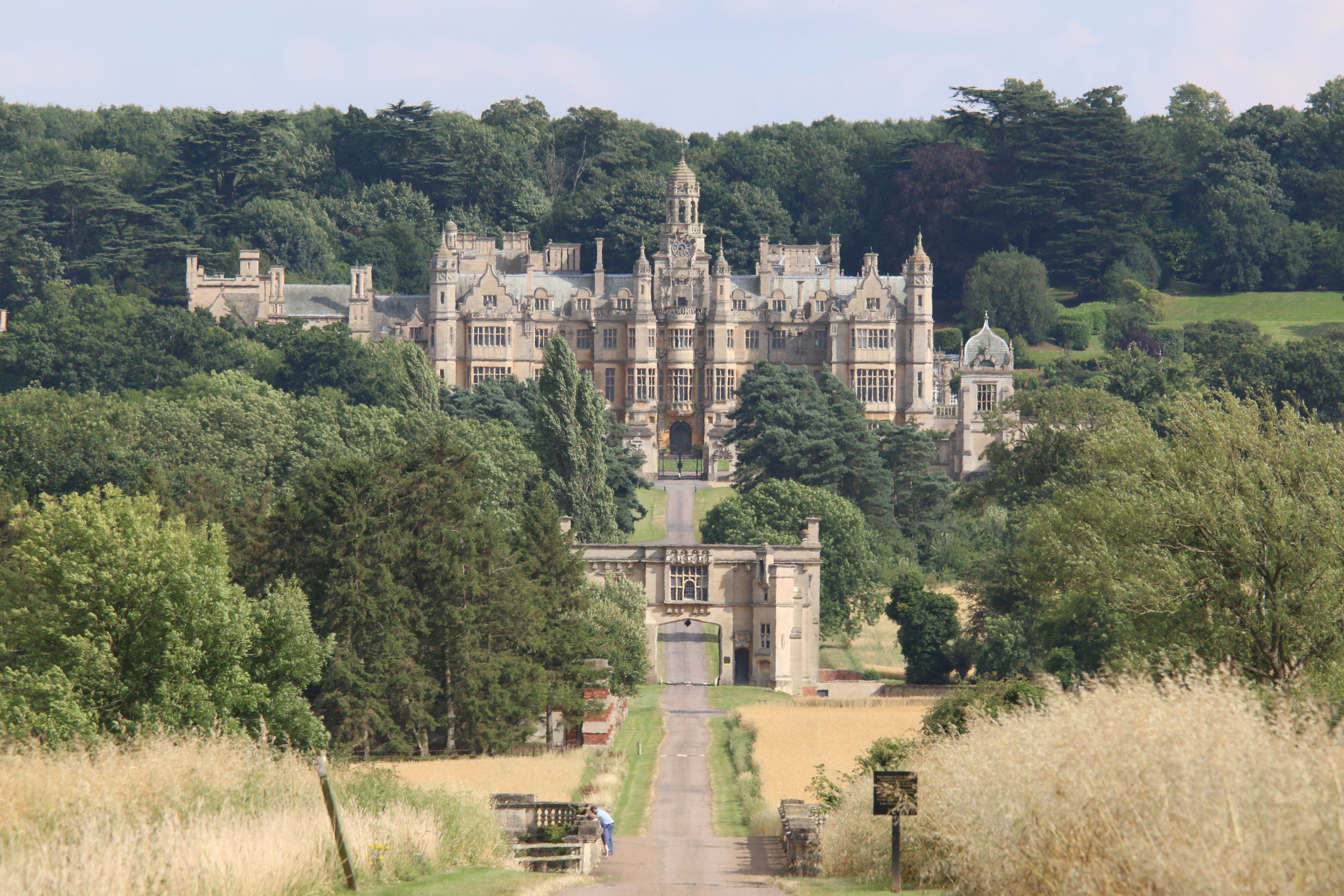

- Location within Lincolnshire
- 52.8806°N 0.671°W
- Location: Harlaxton, Lincolnshire, England

History
- Built for: Gregory Gregory
- Original use: Country house

Site notes
- Architect(s): Anthony Salvin, William Burn
- Architectural style: Jacobethan
- Governing body: University of Evansville

National Register of Historic Parks and Gardens
- Official name: Harlaxton Manor park and garden
- Designated: 24 June 1985
- Reference no.: 1000982

Listed Building – Grade I
- Official name: Harlaxton Manor
- Designated: 19 February 1952
- Reference no.: 1298440

Listed Building – Grade I
- Official name: Forecourt gateway and screen
- Designated: 19 February 1952
- Reference no.: 1236557

Listed Building – Grade II*
- Official name: Harlaxton Manor bridge
- Designated: 24 September 1979
- Reference no.: 1187968

Listed Building – Grade II*
- Official name: Harlaxton Manor Gatehouse
- Designated: 24 September 1979
- Reference no.: 1236606

Harlaxton Manor is a Victorian country house in Harlaxton, Lincolnshire, England. The house was built for Gregory Gregory, a local squire and businessman. Gregory employed two of the leading architects of Victorian England, Anthony Salvin and William Burn and consulted a third, Edward Blore, during its construction. Its architecture, which combines elements of Jacobean and Elizabethan styles with Baroque decoration, makes it unique among England's Jacobethan houses. Harlaxton is a Grade I listed building on the National Heritage List for England, and many other structures on the estate are also listed. The surrounding park and gardens are listed Grade II* on the Register of Historic Parks and Gardens. It is now the British campus of the University of Evansville.

== History ==
Harlaxton is first recorded in Domesday Book as Harleston. The current mansion is the second Harlaxton Manor. The first was built on a different site during the 14th century and was used as a hunting lodge by John of Gaunt. By 1619, Sir Daniel de Ligne purchased the manor. The original house was deserted after 1780; it was inherited by Gregory Gregory, and was torn down in 1857.

=== Gregory family ===
Gregory Gregory (1786–1854) was born Gregory Williams, adopting the surname Gregory when he inherited his uncle's estates. His father was William Gregory Williams (1742–1814) and his mother Olivia Preston (1758–1835). In 1822, Gregory inherited Harlaxton Manor and other property from his uncle George de Ligne Gregory (1740–1822). The original Harlaxton Manor was an ancient building in need of repair and so Gregory did not move to the house, living at the nearby Hungerton Hall. In 1831, he commissioned the architect Anthony Salvin to build his mansion, a process which took 20 years. Unmarried, childless, with no interest in traditional country pursuits, and averse to socialising and entertaining, Gregory developed an all-consuming passion for the building of Harlaxton, and the acquisition of architectural elements, paintings, furniture and glass to fit it out. The diarist Charles Greville, visiting during the house's construction in the 1830s, recorded Gregory's obsessive approach, [see box].

"To-day we went to see the house Mr. Gregory is building, five miles from here. He is a gentleman who has a fancy to build a magnificent house in the Elizabethan style, and he is now in the middle of his work, all the shell being finished except one wing. Nothing can be more perfect than it is, both as to the architecture and the ornaments. Many years ago, when he first conceived this design he began to amass money and lived for no other object. He travelled into all parts of Europe collecting objects of curiosity, useful or ornamental, for his projected palace, and he did not begin to build until he had accumulated money enough to complete his design. The grandeur of it is such, and such the tardiness of its progress, that it is about as much as he will do to live till its completion. It is the means and not the end to which he looks for gratification. He says that it is his amusement, as hunting or shooting or feasting may be the objects of other people and as the pursuit leads him into all parts of the world, and to mix with every variety of nation and character, besides engendering tastes."

— The Greville Memoirs

In 1851, Gregory moved into the completed manor with a staff of fourteen servants including a butler, a housekeeper, three footmen, seven domestic maids and two grooms. By 1854, he was dead. The house was inherited by his cousin, George Gregory. Gregory had loathed his distant relation and attempted to bequeath Harlaxton to a friend but was unable to break the entail on the estate. George Gregory (1775–1860) had been born in London, son of Daniel Gregory (1747–1819). George did not follow his father's occupation as a merchant and instead bought an estate in Lincolnshire. In 1825 at the age of 50, he married Elizabeth Price, twenty years his junior. They moved to Harlaxton after he received his inheritance. With other owners of large houses in the area, George decided to open the house to visitors. George died in 1860 at the manor and another distant relative, John Sherwin Gregory, inherited the house.

John Sherwin Gregory (1803–1869) was born John Sherwin Longden. His father was John Longden and his mother was Charlotte Mettam. His father had inherited Bramcote Manor in Nottinghamshire. When his father died in 1818, John received the Bramcote property, changing his surname to Sherwin, becoming John Sherwin Sherwin. In 1829 he married Catherine Holden. The couple lived at Bramcote until inheriting Harlaxton in 1860, at which point Sherwin again changed his surname, becoming John Sherwin Gregory.

John died in 1869 and Catherine continued to live at Harlaxton Manor until her death in 1892 at the age of 86. Her obituary recorded that she was highly regarded as a benefactor, both of the church at Harlaxton and of the sick and poor of the parish. When she died in 1892, Thomas Sherwin Pearson, who was the second cousin and godson of John Sherwin Gregory, inherited the manor. Thomas added Gregory to his surname, becoming Thomas Sherwin Pearson Gregory (1851–1935). He was born in Barwell, Leicestershire, son of General Thomas Hooke Pearson and Francis Elizabeth Ashby Mettam. Thomas' grandfather the Reverend George Mettam was the brother of John Sherwin Gregory's mother Charlotte Mettam and was John's second cousin. Thomas was educated at Rugby and the University of Oxford, becoming a first-class cricketer. In 1885, he married Mabel Laura Payne and, in his inheritance in 1892, moved to Harlaxton with his wife and their son Philip John Sherwin Pearson-Gregory (1888–1955), who himself inherited the estate in 1935. Philip decided not to live in the house and, following an auction of the contents which lasted three days, it was sold in 1937.

=== 20th century ===
Violet Van der Elst, a businesswoman and inventor, made her money from developing the first brushless shaving cream and made her name by campaigning against capital punishment. She restored the house, having renamed it Grantham Castle, and had it wired for electricity, before losing almost all of her fortune in what the writer Simon Jenkins terms "obsessive litigation". During the Second World War, Harlaxton was requisitioned by the British government as the officers' mess for RAF Harlaxton and later to house a company of the 1st Airborne Division. In 1948, Harlaxton was purchased by the Society of Jesus, who used it as a novitiate. Stanford University leased Harlaxton Manor from the Jesuits in 1965, and with only 80 students in its first year, it was the first American university in Great Britain. Stanford used the manor as part of its British study abroad programme but the relative isolation of the house made it unpopular and the programme relocated to Cliveden in Berkshire in 1969.

=== University of Evansville ===
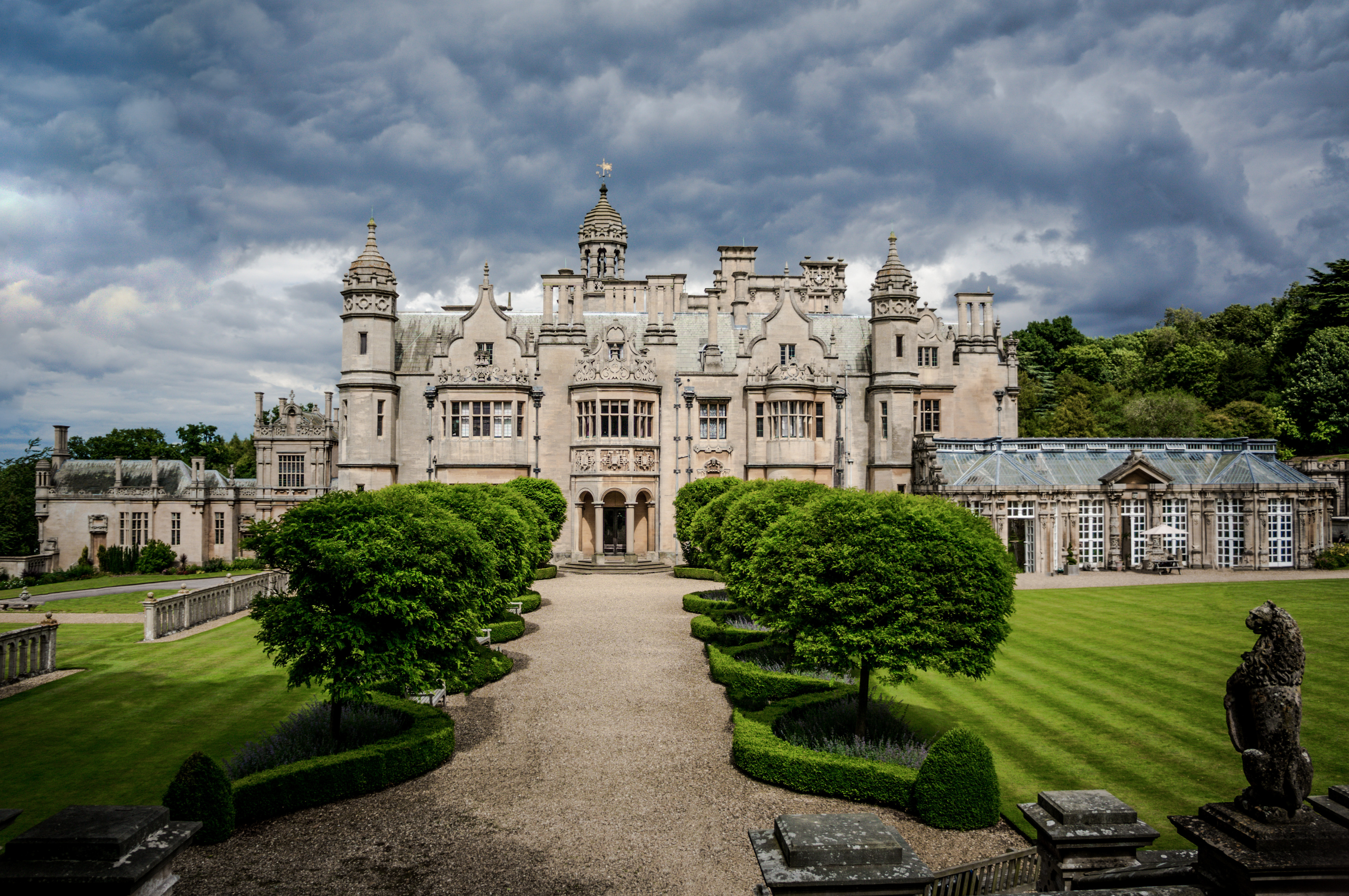
Harlaxton College, side view

Harlaxton is now owned by the University of Evansville, operating as Harlaxton College, and is the base for their study-abroad programme. A number of other American universities also use the estate. Evansville began using the property in 1971 as its British campus, but it was bought personally by William Ridgway, a trustee of the university, and held by him until he donated it to the university in 1986. Immediately after the purchase the university began renovating the entire facility. (Note: The renovations continued into the 1990s, and included extensive restoration of the grounds.) From 1984 to 2024, Harlaxton Manor was the site of the annual Harlaxton Medieval Symposium, an interdisciplinary symposium on medieval art, literature and architecture. This event was relocated to Madingley Hall, Cambridge, in 2024. The house and gardens are occasionally opened for public tours.

== Architecture and description ==
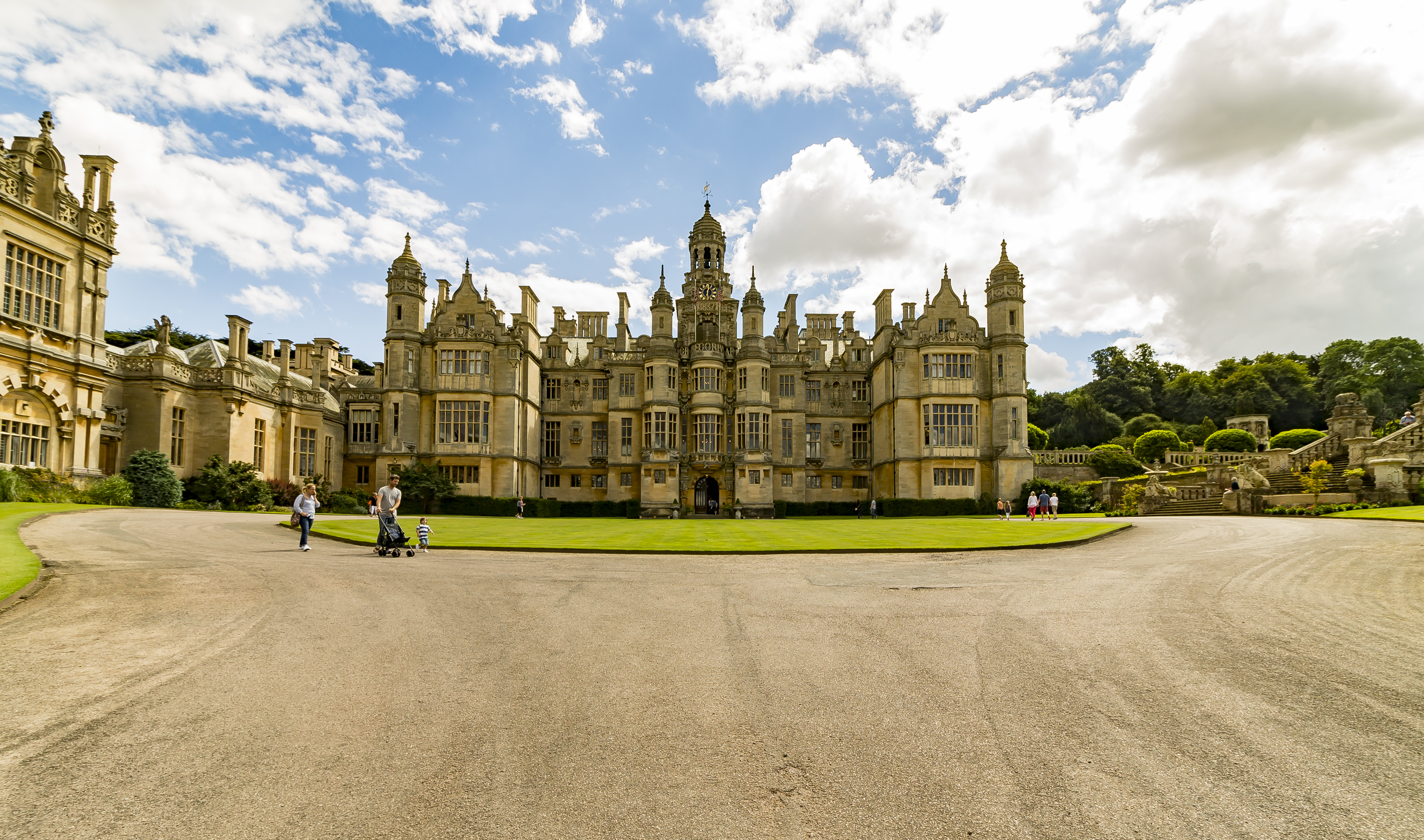
The entrance front

Nicholas Antram, in his revised Lincolnshire volume of the Pevsner Buildings of England published in 2002, describes the approach to Harlaxton Manor as a "crescendo of effects". From the entrance gates on the A607, just outside of the village of Harlaxton, the drive descends into a valley before crossing a serpentine lake by way of a five-arch bridge. It then passes the kitchen gardens before going through an outer gatehouse. It continues past the stables before entering the cour d'honneur through a second, double, gatehouse, described by Antram as a "pyrotechnic display". The visitor is then confronted by the "towering façade" of the main house. Gregory employed three of the major architects of the Victorian era to achieve his effects; Anthony Salvin was responsible for the majority of the exterior work, (Note: Salvin was 31 when Gregory first consulted him in June 1831. Still relatively young, he had nonetheless already built two major houses in the newly-popular Tudor Revival style, Mamhead House in Devon and Moreby Hall in Yorkshire.) Edward Blore was consulted, and William Burn undertook the conservatory and the kitchen range. There is debate among architectural historians as to who was responsible for the design of the interiors. Salvin had been dismissed by the time of their fitting out, and Burn seems unlikely. Historic England suggests that Gregory "acted largely as his own architect" and Antram and Mark Girouard agree that Gregory must have made a major contribution. But Jill Allibone, Salvin's biographer, is certain that Gregory alone could not have been responsible for the extraordinary designs.

The house cost Gregory in the region of £100,000, (£9,590,000 in 2025 adjusted for inflation) a large outlay for a landowner with an annual income of £12,000, but as it had been over 30 years in the planning and as building was undertaken at a leisurely pace, the sum was affordable from his income. (Note: Mark Girouard records the total expenditure on building and fitting out as traditionally being said to have been £200,000.)

=== Exterior ===
Harlaxton is built to an Elizabethan E-plan. The foundation stone of the main central block was laid by Gregory in 1832 and the house was complete externally by 1837. All of this is by Anthony Salvin, with Gregory's input. The main construction materials are Ancaster stone, ashlar and brick. (Note: The stone was quarried at Ancaster in Lincolnshire and is also the main building stone used at nearby Belton House, 150 years before Harlaxton.) Salvin enhanced the drama of the entrance front by making the entry at basement level, the corresponding garden elevation behind opens directly onto a parterre. The main architectural style is that of an Elizabethan or Jacobethan prodigy house, such as nearby Burghley or Wollaton Hall in Nottinghamshire, although with notable European influences. Mark Girouard, in his 1979 study, The Victorian Country House, records that Gregory had visited "Bramshill, Hardwick, Hatfield, Knole, Burghley, Wollaton, Kirby Longleat, Temple Newsam and the Oxford and Cambridge colleges " in pursuit of Elizabethan inspiration. The uniqueness of Harlaxton, however, is the fusion of Elizabethan and Jacobean styles with the architecture and design of the Baroque. Girouard notes that this blending continues "in varying proportions all through the house" and suggests David Bryce, William Burn's chief assistant, as a possible source.

==== Entrance front ====
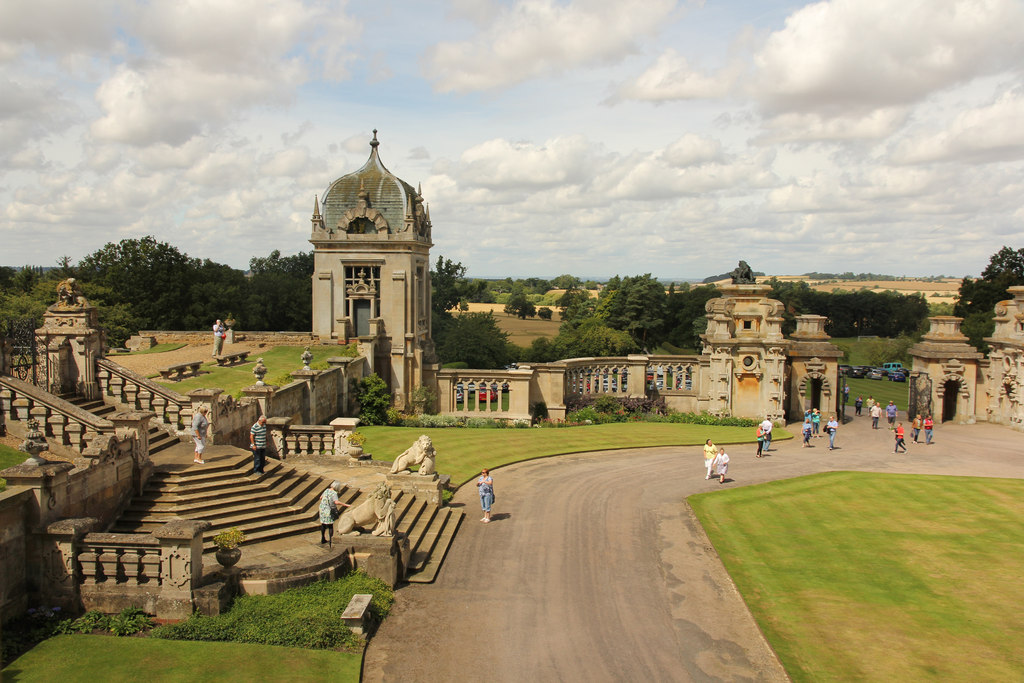
Forecourt with Burn's gazebo

The entrance front consists of a central block with a two-storey oriel window flanked by three-storey towers with bay windows and topped by cupolas. The doorway is framed by two pilasters. Behind this there is a square tower, with an octagonal turret containing a clock and again finishing in a cupola. The sources for all of these elements can be traced: the overall impression is of Burghley House; the pilasters are a direct lift from a 16th-century German architectural work, the Architectura by Wendel Dietterlin, a copy of which Gregory is known to have owned; the oriel is from Hengrave Hall in Suffolk. Antram also identifies elements from Northumberland House and from Stonyhurst. Girouard writes, "the resulting impression of power, exuberance and abundance is sensational". To the left is a service wing by Burn, which is visually balanced by a gazebo to the right, drawn from Wollaton Hall.

==== Inner and outer gatehouses ====
By the time Gregory came to begin the building of the entrance to the cour d'honneur, Salvin had been dismissed. The reason for this is unclear, but the consensus among architectural historians is that disagreements about Gregory's future plans for the design and decoration of his house led to an estrangement. After some consultation with Edward Blore, Gregory employed William Burn. Historic England credits Burn, his assistant David Bryce, and Gregory himself with the design of the gateway. (Note: Both Antram and Franklin are sceptical that Burn, "a dry and somewhat prosaic designer", could alone be responsible for the designs of the screen and lodges.) Antram considers the lodges and screen to be unlike anything else in England of that date, and comparable only to the work of John Vanbrugh at Blenheim Palace. The central gateway is flanked by two pavilions with pierced archways and larger lodges to each side. The outer lodges are topped by "scrolled consoles [supporting] sacrophagi...the scale gargantuan".

The outer gatehouse is earlier and was designed by Salvin in a much more restrained Tudor Revival style.

=== Interior ===
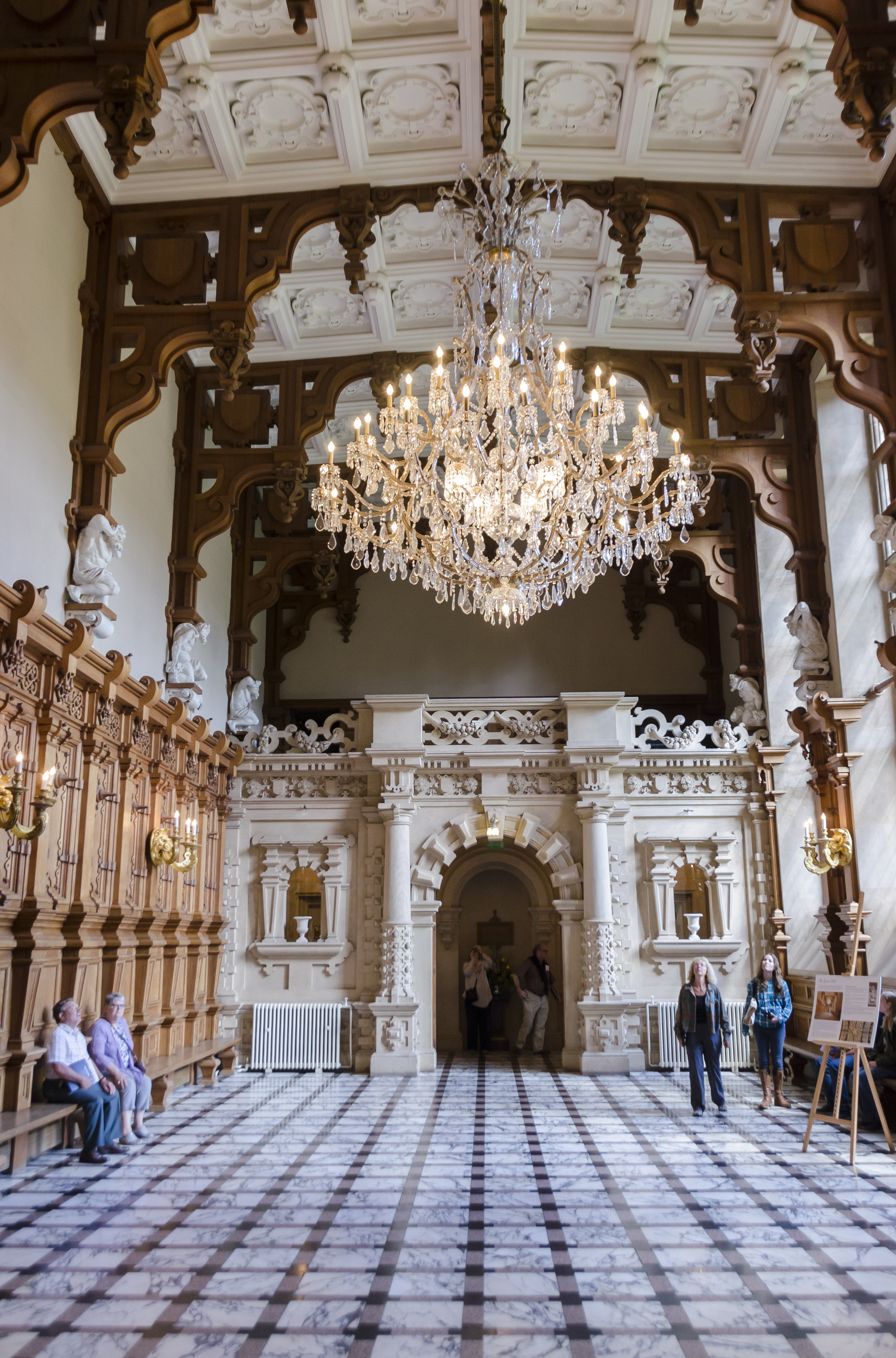
The Great Hall

The interiors at Harlaxton have been described as "a prodigious display of decorative virtuosity unparalleled in 19th century England". The designers are an uncertain mixture of Salvin, Burn, Bryce and possibly others, all influenced by Gregory himself. Jill Franklin, in her 1981 study, The Gentleman's Country House and its plan 1835–1914, writes of the unusual nature of the interior layout of Harlaxton. Noting that there is no easy means of circulation, and that the entrance hall, the only public space at the front ground floor level, leads up via flights of stairs to two awkwardly placed landings, through which entrance is made into the main entertaining rooms of the house by concealed jib doors, she suggests that the house was always in fact designed for show, rather than for living; "a guided tour, with the visitor giving delighted cries of surprise as each door is flung open".

In the early 19th century, Gregory is believed to have held a post at the British Embassy in Paris. While there, and taking advantage of the cheap prices occasioned by the end of the Napoleonic Wars, he embarked on a spending spree purchasing "panelling, chimneypieces, furniture and tapestries in great quantity". He also travelled extensively, "as far as Constantinople and the Crimea", taking particular interest in the Baroque design of Germany and Austria. The wood carver William Gibbs Rogers, who visited the house in the 1860s when Gregory's collection was still intact, recorded his impressions; "marbles, jaspers, cabinets, porcelain of fabulous value, Buhl, rare sculptures, delicate carvings, furniture, tapestries, all in glorious and unreadable confusion". (Note: William Gibbs Ro(d)gers (1792–1875) was a highly successful wood carver who worked at Chatsworth, Keele Hall and the House of Lords.) (Note: Jill Allibone notes that Gregory was primarily interested in art works for their contribution to the overall design and decoration of his house, "He does not seem to have owned many pictures of any quality, although he did have a seascape in oils by Richard Parkes Bonington”.)

The house was technologically advanced; a miniature railway, originally used to transport brick from Gregory's kilns to the house, and subsequently used to move coal, was run into the house on a viaduct and continued into the roof spaces to supply the internal coal bunkers. (Note: As an indicator of Gregory's long-term planning for Harlaxton, he leased a kiln to a brickmaker in 1826 on a six-year contract, with a requirement for the supply of 400,000 bricks each building season.)

==== Great hall ====
Entry to the house is through Salvin's entrance hall, set at basement level. Stairs rise to the first floor where the great hall is entered through a stone screens passage. The main inspiration for what Gregory called the Barons' hall, is that at Audley End House in Essex, but the design and decoration has decidedly Baroque elements such as the "muscular atlantes" supporting the roof trusses. Other decorative elements are more traditional, the stained glass in the window is by Thomas Willement and depicts Gregory's heraldry and ancestry. (Note: Thomas Willement is also recorded as having restored fragments of original stained glass from the earlier Harlaxton Manor for installation in Gregory's new house, but nothing of this remains.) The chandelier is a later introduction, bought by Mrs Van Elst, when its transportation to the intended destination, a palace in Madrid, was interrupted by the Spanish Civil War.

==== Gold drawing room ====
Louis XV style in decoration, as are most of the state rooms, this drawing room may have been created to emulate the Elizabeth saloon at nearby Belvoir Castle. The decoration may be by John Crace.

==== Cedar staircase ====
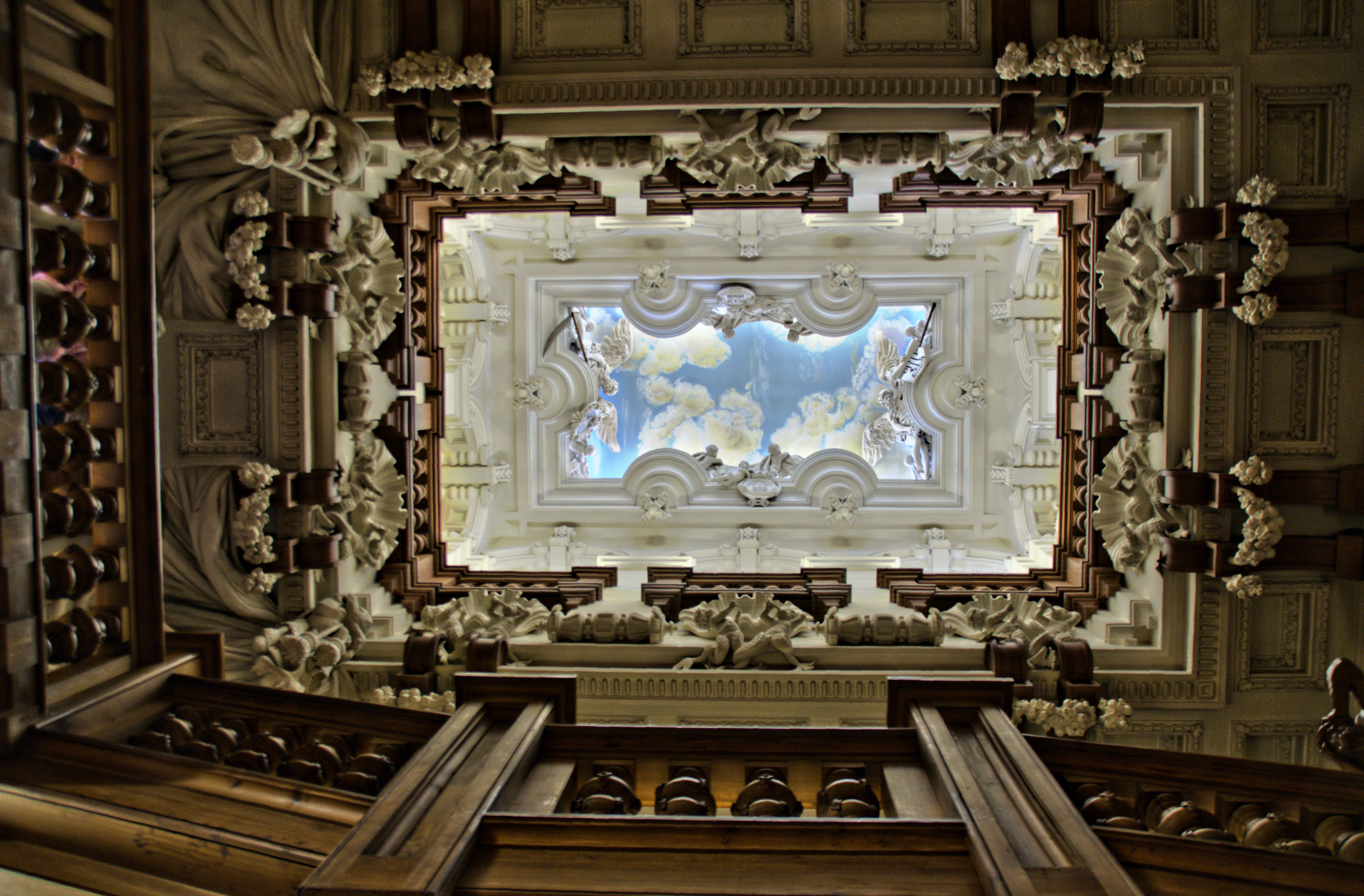
The Cedar Staircase

The Cedar staircase is placed within a tower that is invisible externally. It appears to rise three full storeys in what Michael Hall, in his 2009 study, The Victorian Country House calls an, "astonishingly theatrical tour de force". This is in fact a trompe-l'œil illusion, as the upper storey is merely a decorative device and leads nowhere, culminating in a fake sky. The decoration is entirely Baroque; "swagged curtains interlaced with thriving putti blowing trumpets and supporting huge scallop shells". Franklin notes that the style would amaze in a German church but is extraordinary in an English country house. The plasterwork, here and elsewhere in the house, is possibly by the firm of Bernasconi, a London-based firm of Italian origin. An alternative theory is that Salvin, who is known to have visited Bavaria in 1835, brought back local German craftsmen to undertake the work, but architectural historians favour the former suggestion. The Bernasconi Company certainly had the necessary experience, having been employed at both Buckingham Palace and Windsor Castle.

=== Listing designations ===
The manor is listed at Grade I while the gardens and park are listed at Grade II* on the Register of Historic Parks and Gardens. To the north-west of Harlaxton Manor, the bridge 800 metres from the house is listed Grade II*, as is the gatehouse 400 metres away and its attached boundary walls. The kitchen's garden walls and the gardener's house 500 metres to the north-west are listed Grade II* and the stables 70 metres from the house with their adjoining screen wall are listed Grade II. The gateway and screen wall 1,200 metres north-west of the manor are listed Grade II.

The walls, steps, and gazebos to the south-west of the forecourt are listed Grade I. The statue at the head of the ornamental garden steps 50 metres south-west of the manor and the twelve stone benches in the garden to the south-west of the forecourt are both listed Grade II. The ornamental garden steps 50 metres south-west of the manor are listed Grade II*.

To the south of Harlaxton Manor, the garden loggia and the loggia's steps and trough 90 metres to the south of the house are listed Grade II. The gazebo 80 metres south of the manor is listed Grade II*. The steps to the east and the west of the gazebo 80 metres south of the manor are listed Grade II. The Baroque terrace fountain and statues 25 metres south-east of the manor are listed Grade II*.

== Media appearances ==
The manor is a popular location for filming. Exterior and interior shots have featured in The Ruling Class, The Last Days of Patton, The Lady and the Highwayman, The Haunting, The Young Visiters and The Secret Garden.

== Gallery ==
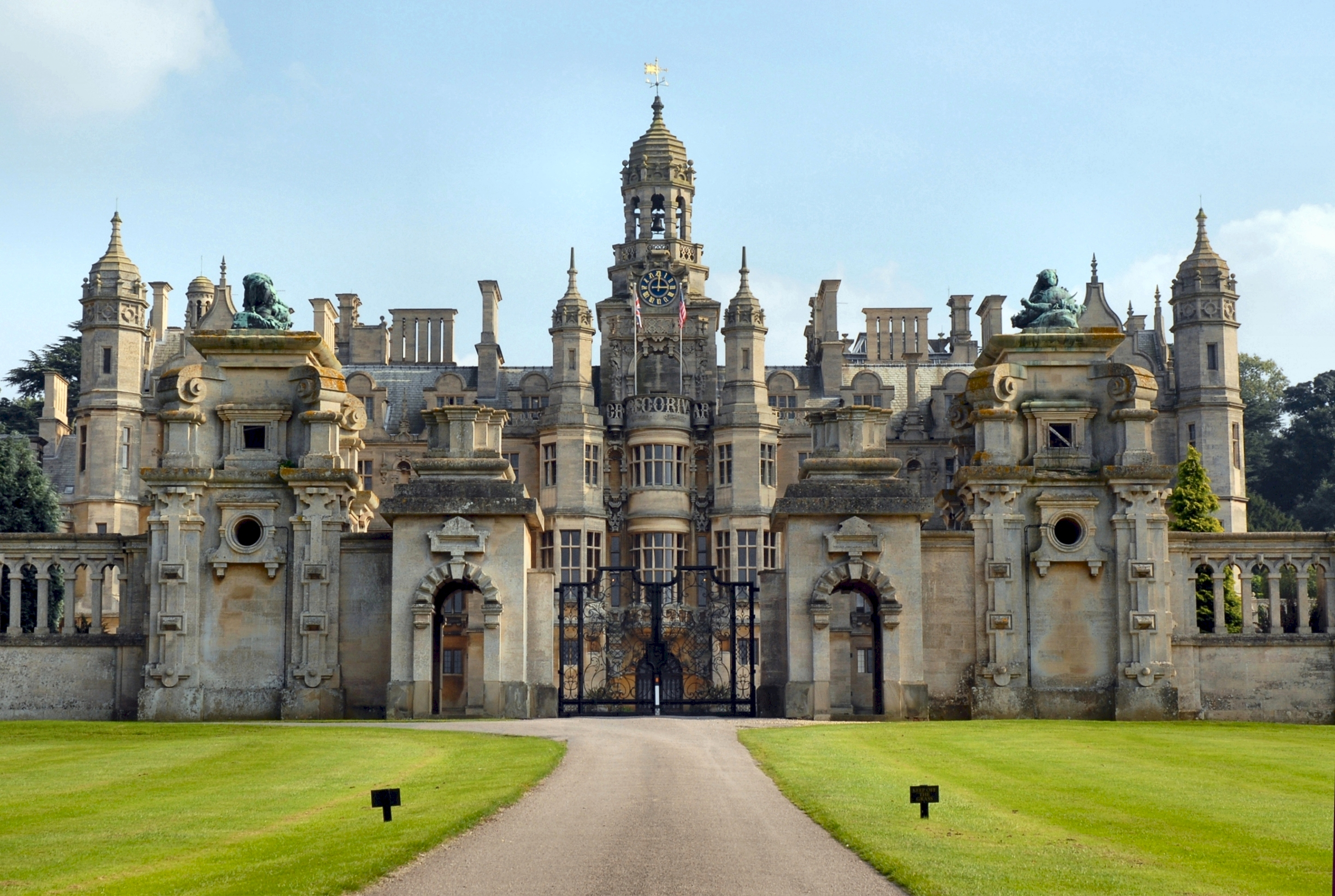
Entrance gate, frontage

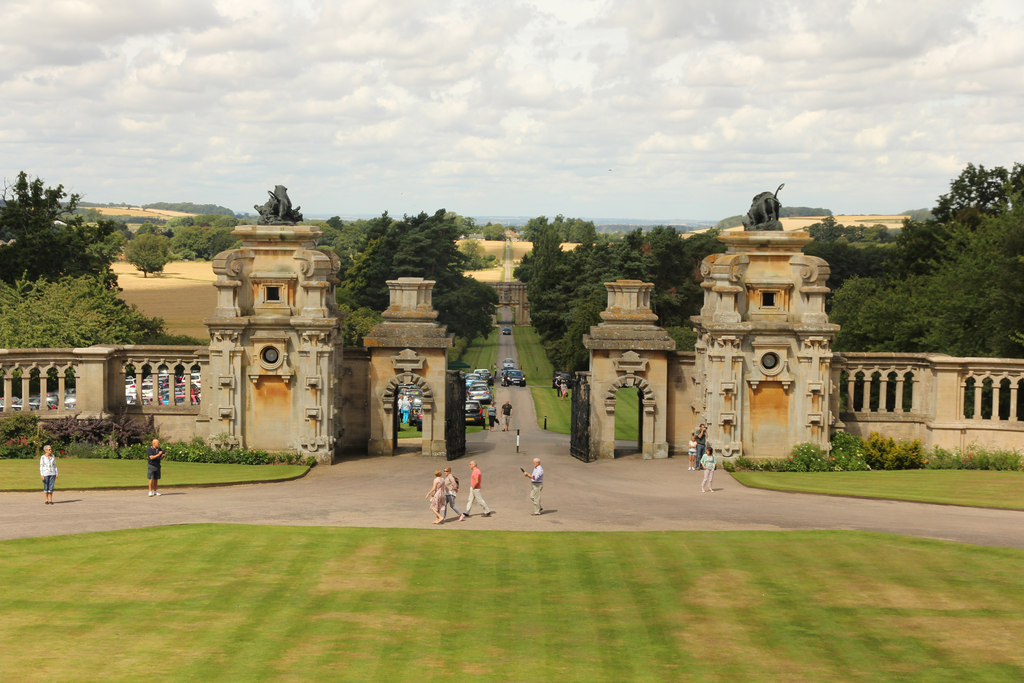
The inner gates onto the forecourt

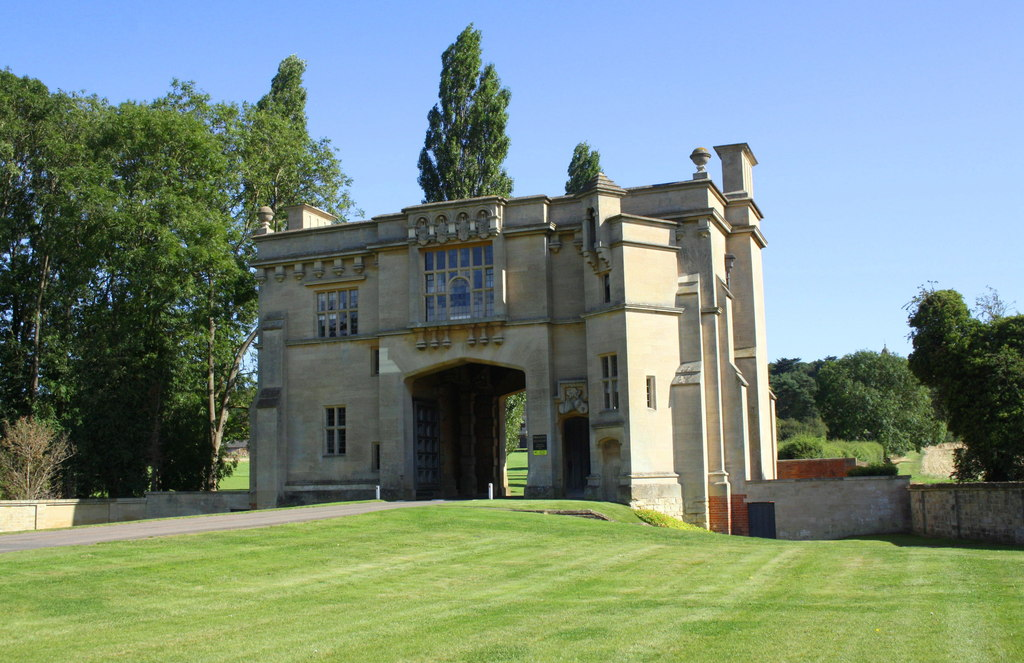
Salvin's Tudor outer gatehouse

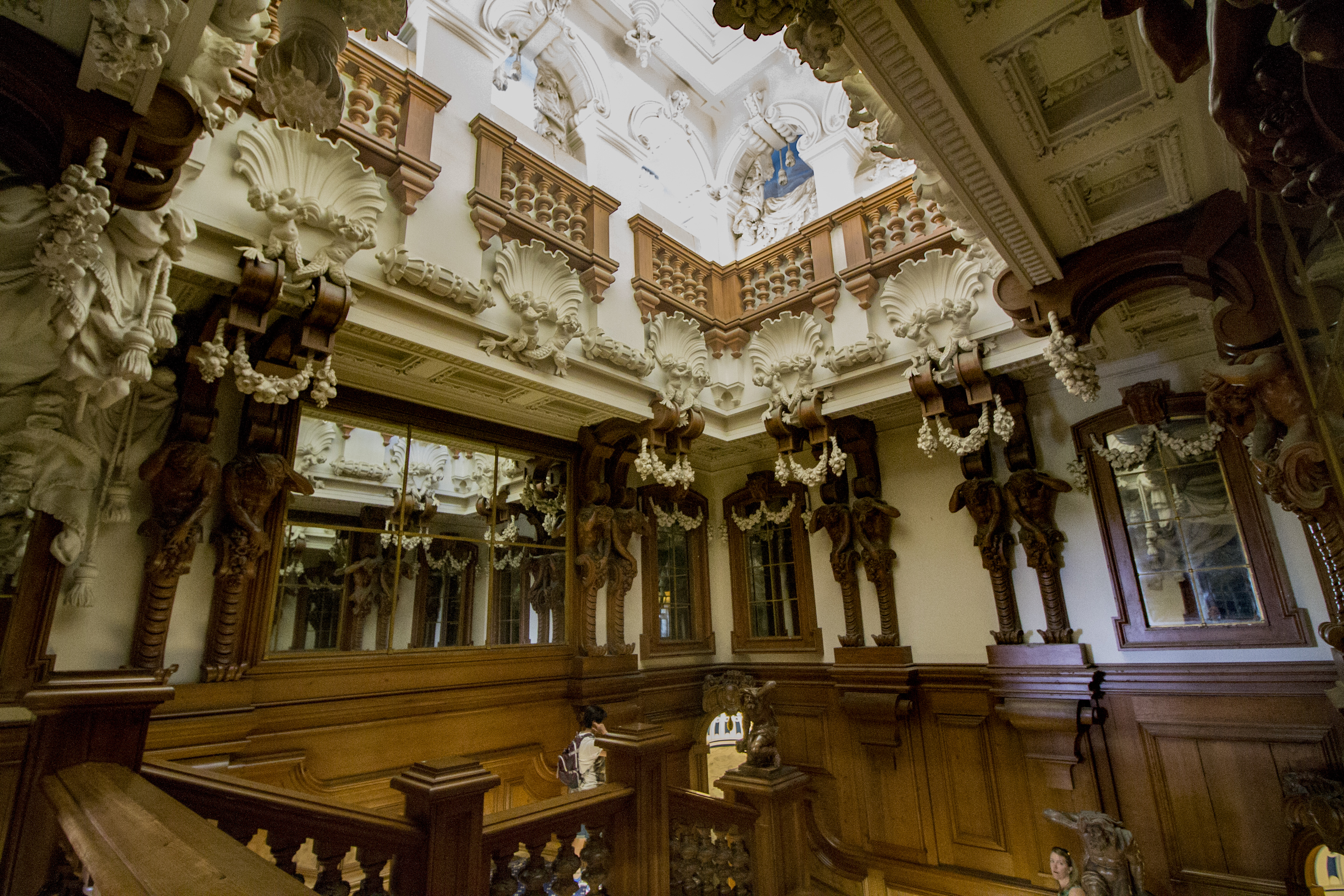
The Cedar Staircase

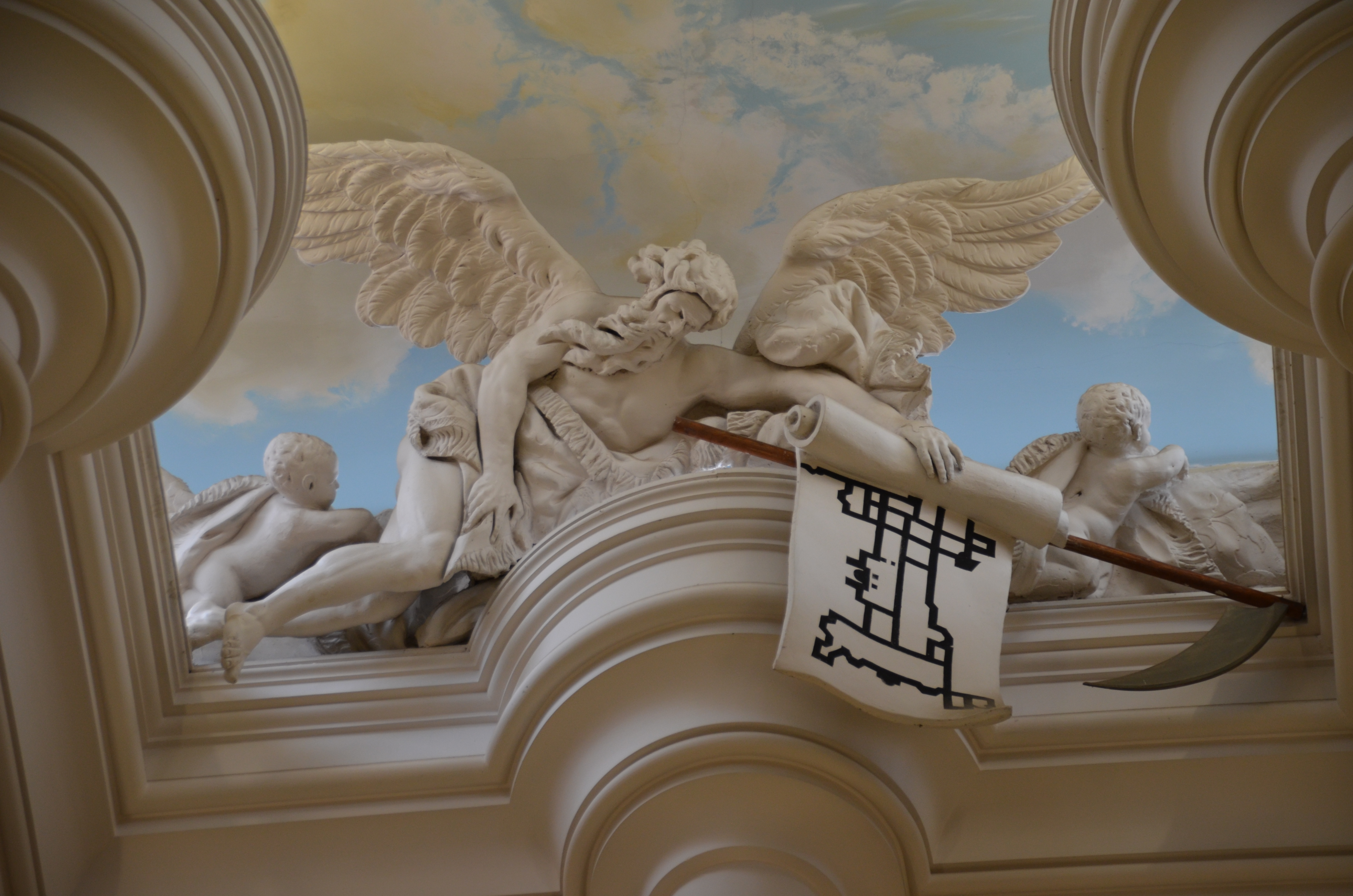
Father Time, at the top of the Cedar Stair, holding a plan of Harlaxton

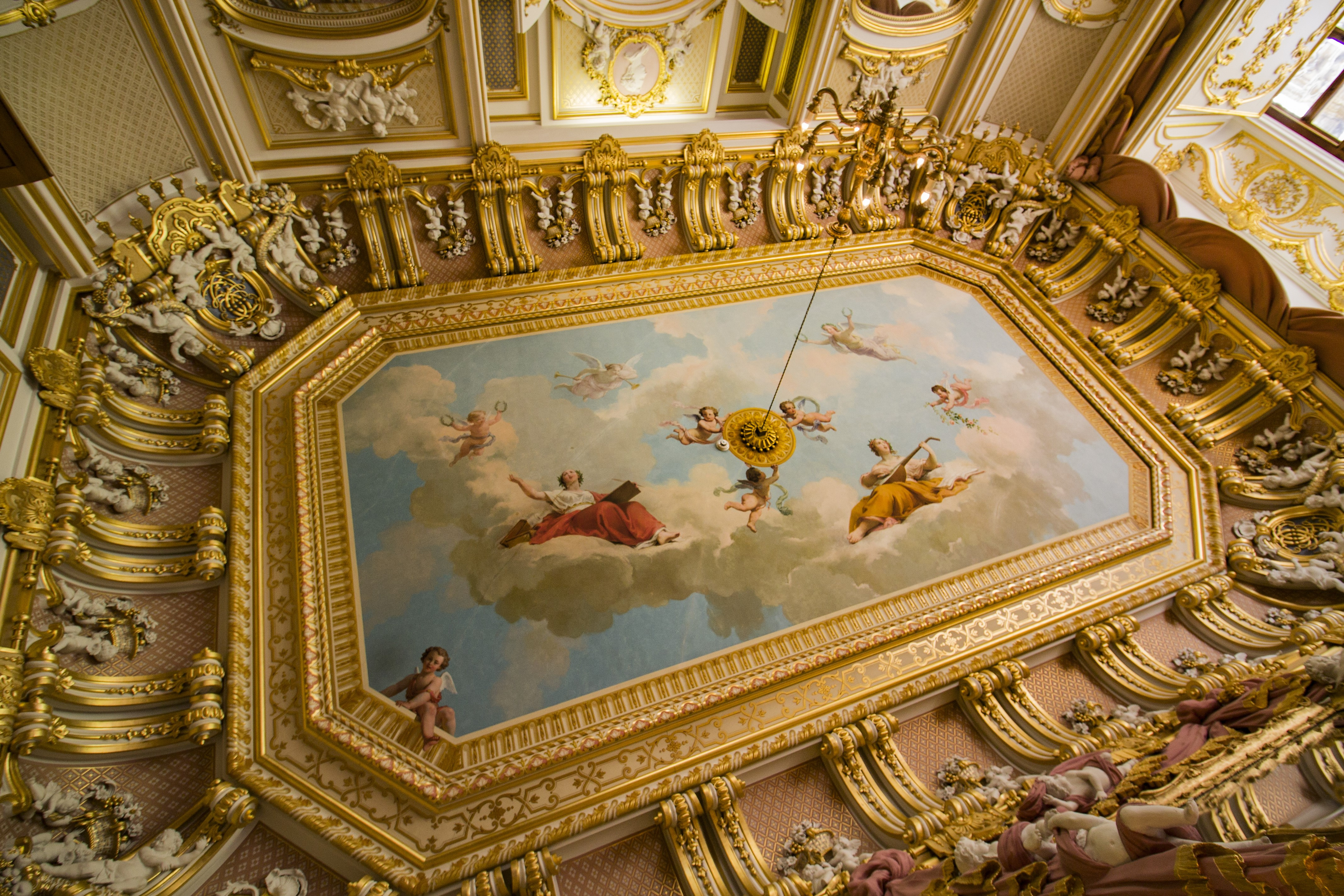
Ceiling to the Gold Drawing Room

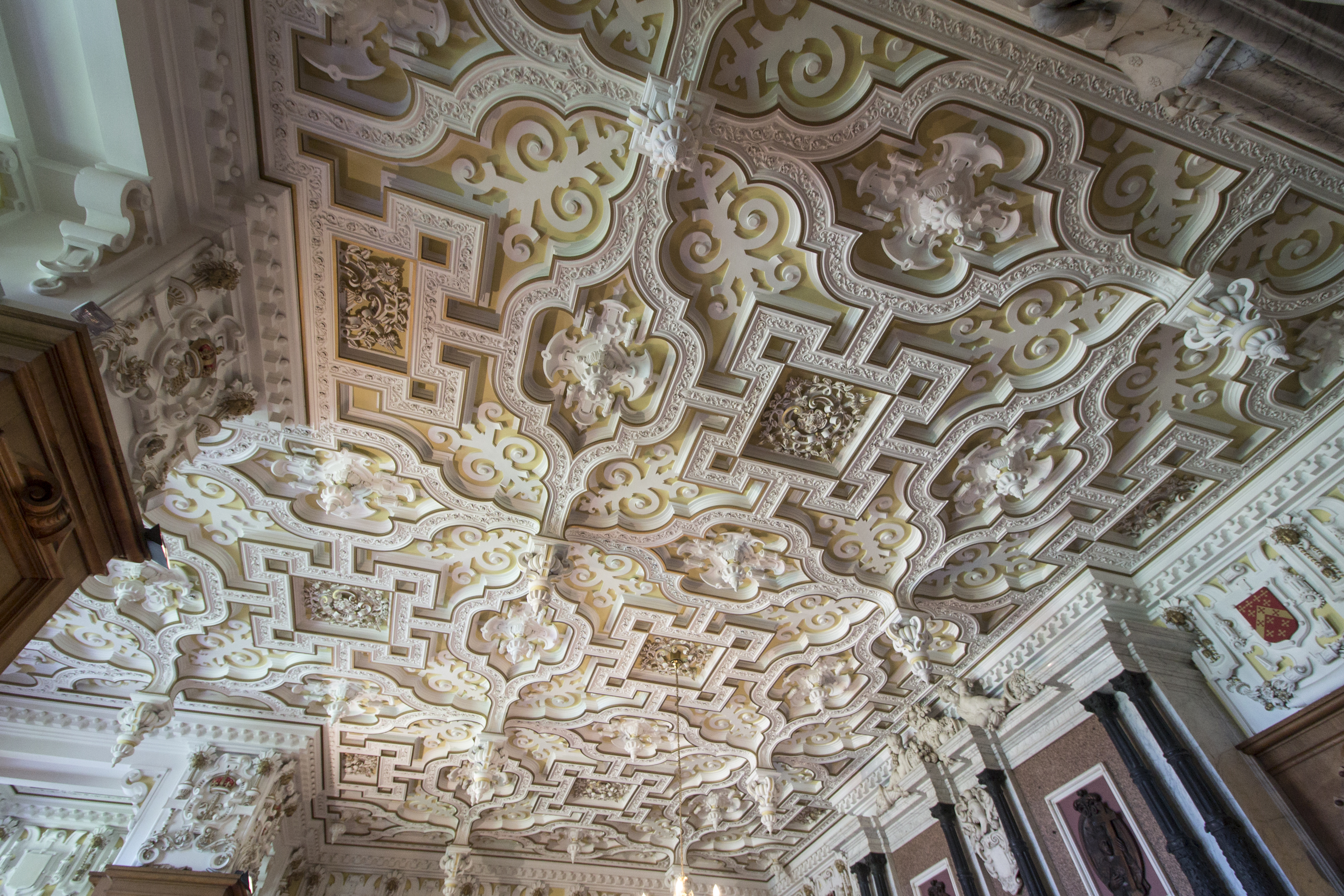
Ceiling to the Ante Room

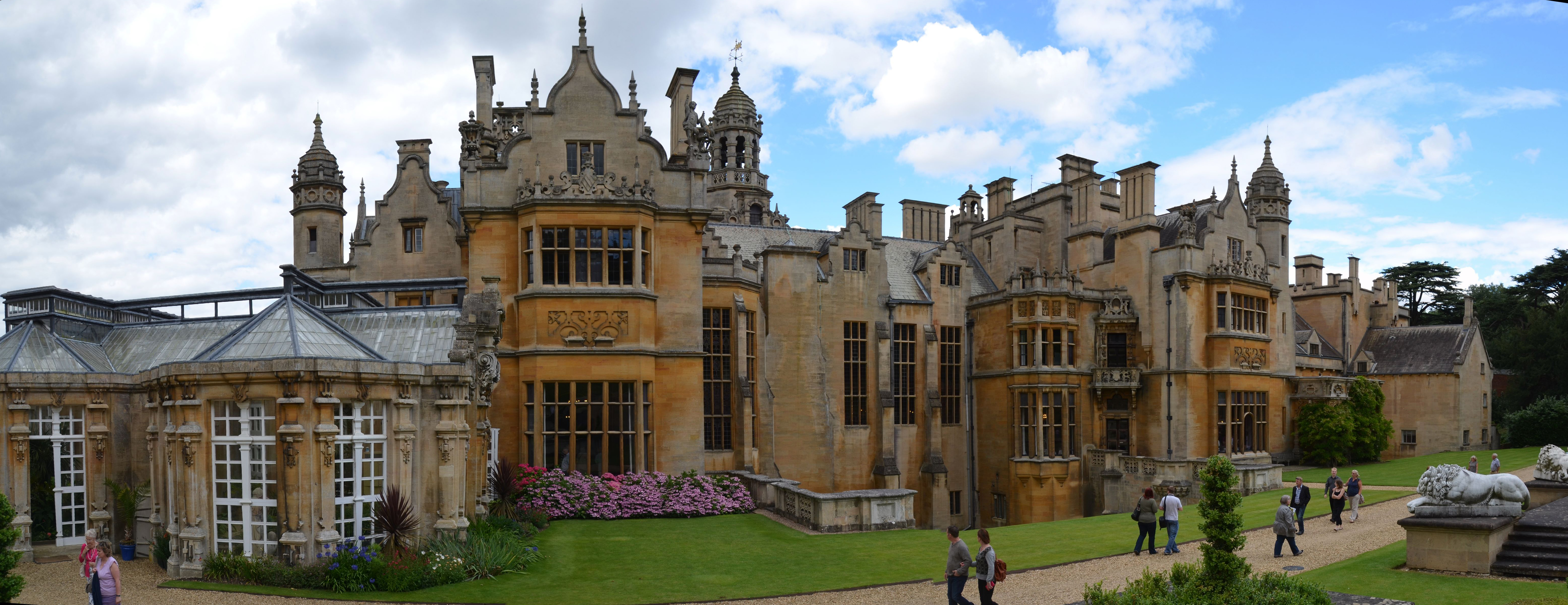
The garden front

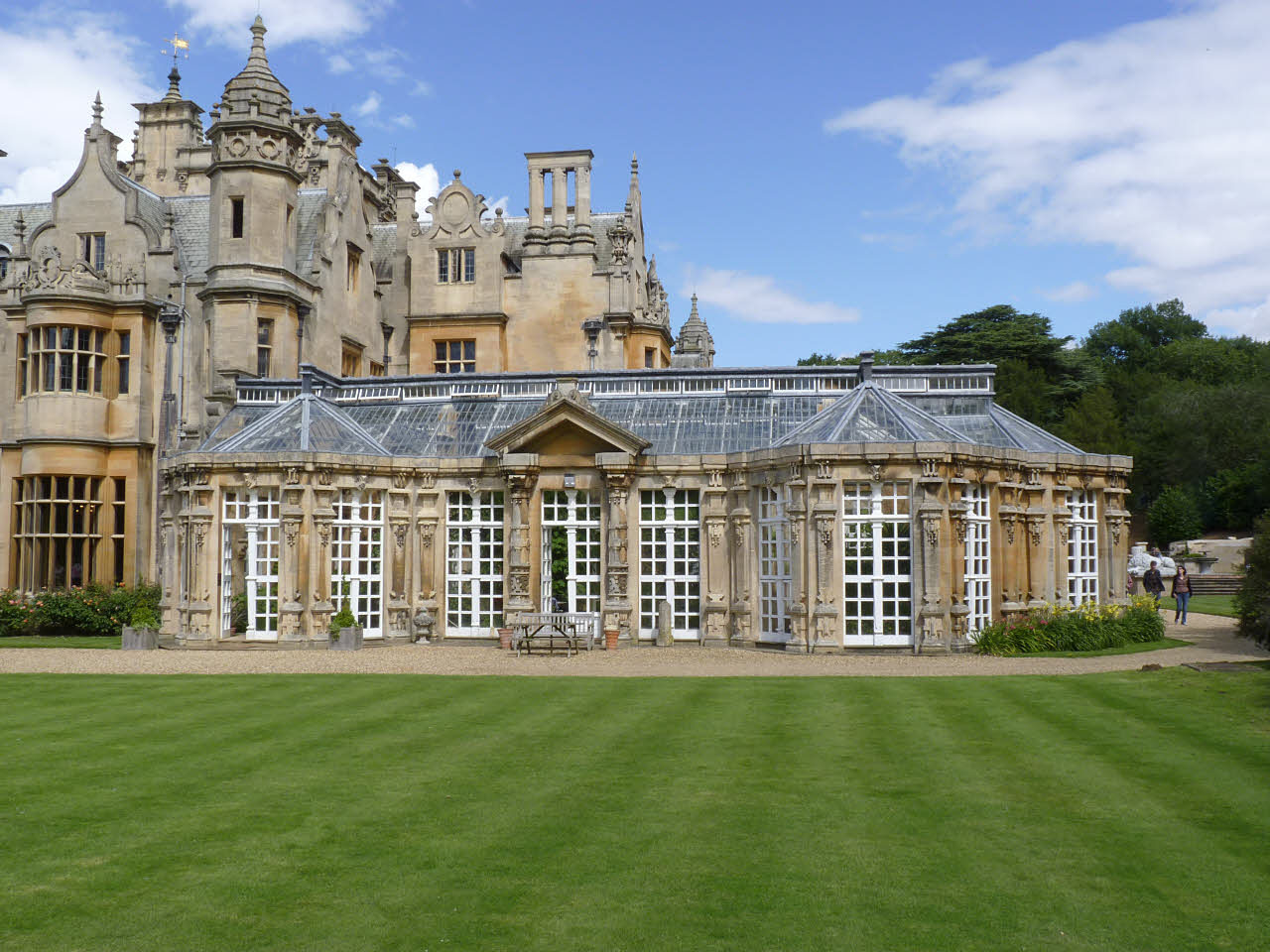
Burn's conservatory

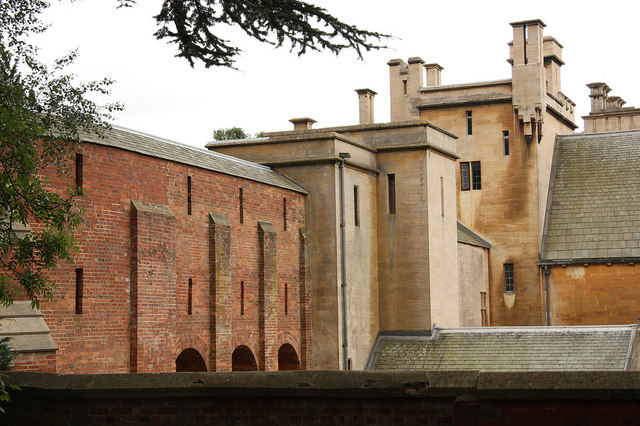
The service viaduct which carries the miniature railway into the house

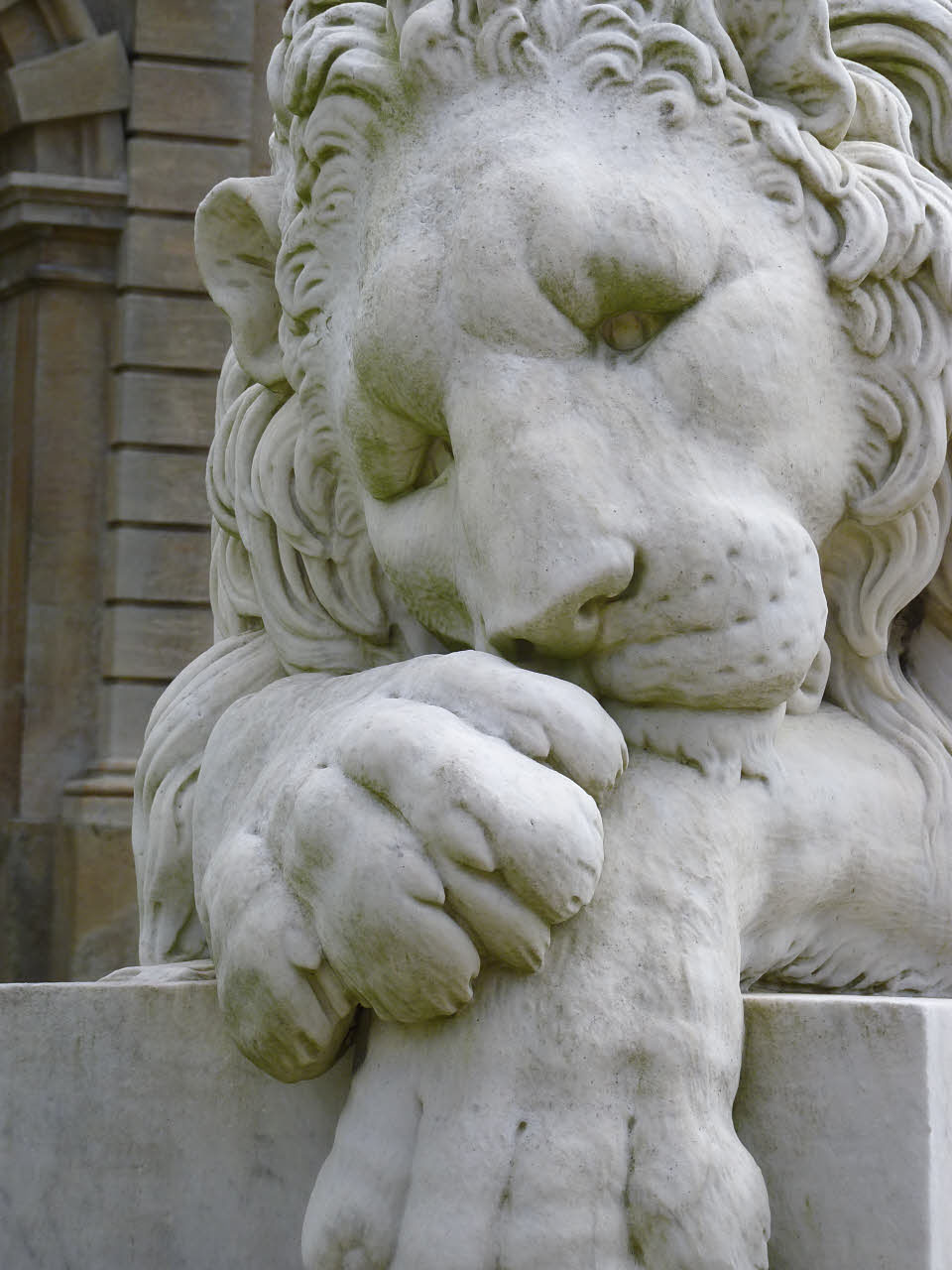
One of the "Harlaxton lions" - introduced by Violet Van der Elst

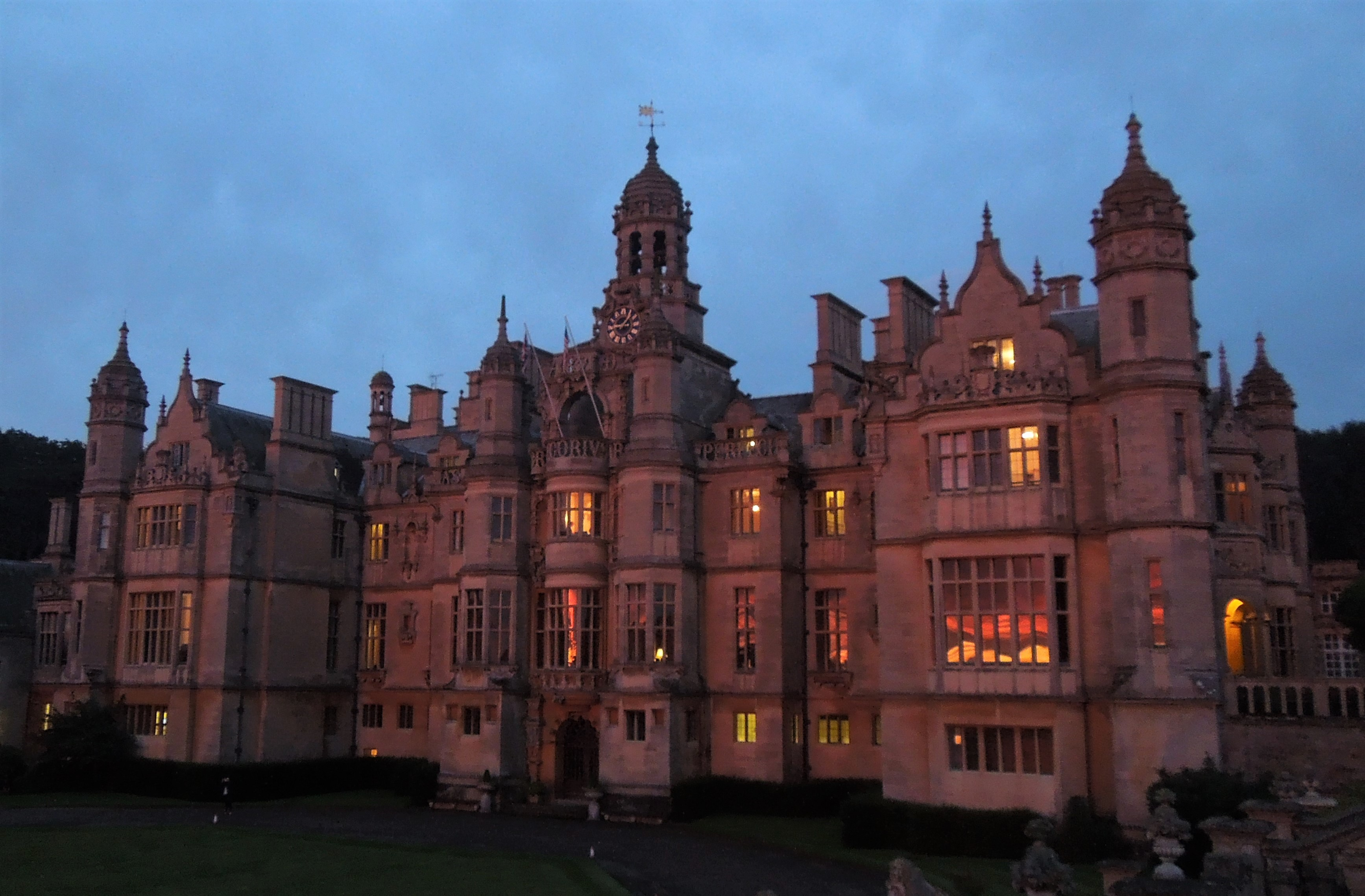
Harlaxton Manor at sunset

== Sources ==
- Allibone, Jill (1988). Anthony Salvin: Pioneer of Gothic Revival Architecture. Cambridge: Lutterworth Press. ISBN 0-7188-2707-4.
- Frederick Arthur Crisp, ed. (1902). Visitation of England and Wales. London: Privately printed. OCLC 83221880.
- Franklin, Jill (1981). The Gentleman's Country House and its Plan 1835–1914. London: Routledge & Kegan Paul. ISBN 978-0-7100-0622-6.
- Girouard, Mark (1979). The Victorian Country House. New Haven, US and London: Yale University Press. ISBN 9-780300-02390-9. "The Victorian Country House."
- Hall, Michael (2009). The Victorian Country House. London, UK: Aurum Press. ISBN 978-1-84513-457-0.
- Jenkins, Simon (2003). England's Thousand Best Houses. London: Penguin Books. ISBN 978-0-7139-9596-1. OCLC 813876627.
- Nicholl, John (1866). Some Account of the Worshipful Company of Ironmongers. London: Privately printed. OCLC 249155046.
- Pevsner, Nikolaus; Harris, John; Antram, Nicholas (2002). Lincolnshire. The Buildings of England. New Haven and London: Yale University Press. ISBN 0-300-09620-8.
- Tinniswood, Adrian (1999) [1992]. Belton House. The National Trust. ISBN 0-7078-0113-3.
- Wainright, Clive; Beard, Geoffrey; Rowlands, Graddon (2000). University of Evansville (ed.). Harlaxton Manor Guidebook. Norwich: Jarrold Publishing. OCLC 729582866.
- Walford, Edward (1869). The County Families of the United Kingdom. London: R Hardwicke. OCLC 912971264.
