= Harlaxton =

Coordinates: 52.8841°N 0.6870°W

- Location within Lincolnshire
- Population: 705 (2001)
- OS grid reference: SK884325
  - London: 95 mi (153 km) S
- District: South Kesteven
- Shire county: Lincolnshire
- Region: East Midlands
- Country: England
- Sovereign state: United Kingdom
- Post town: GRANTHAM
- Postcode district: NG32
- Dialling code: 01476
- Police: Lincolnshire
- Fire: Lincolnshire
- Ambulance: East Midlands
- UK Parliament: Grantham and Bourne

Harlaxton is a village and civil parish in the South Kesteven district of Lincolnshire, England. It lies on the edge of the Vale of Belvoir and just off the A607, 2 miles (3 km) south-west from Grantham and 12 miles (19 km) north-east from Melton Mowbray.

== History ==
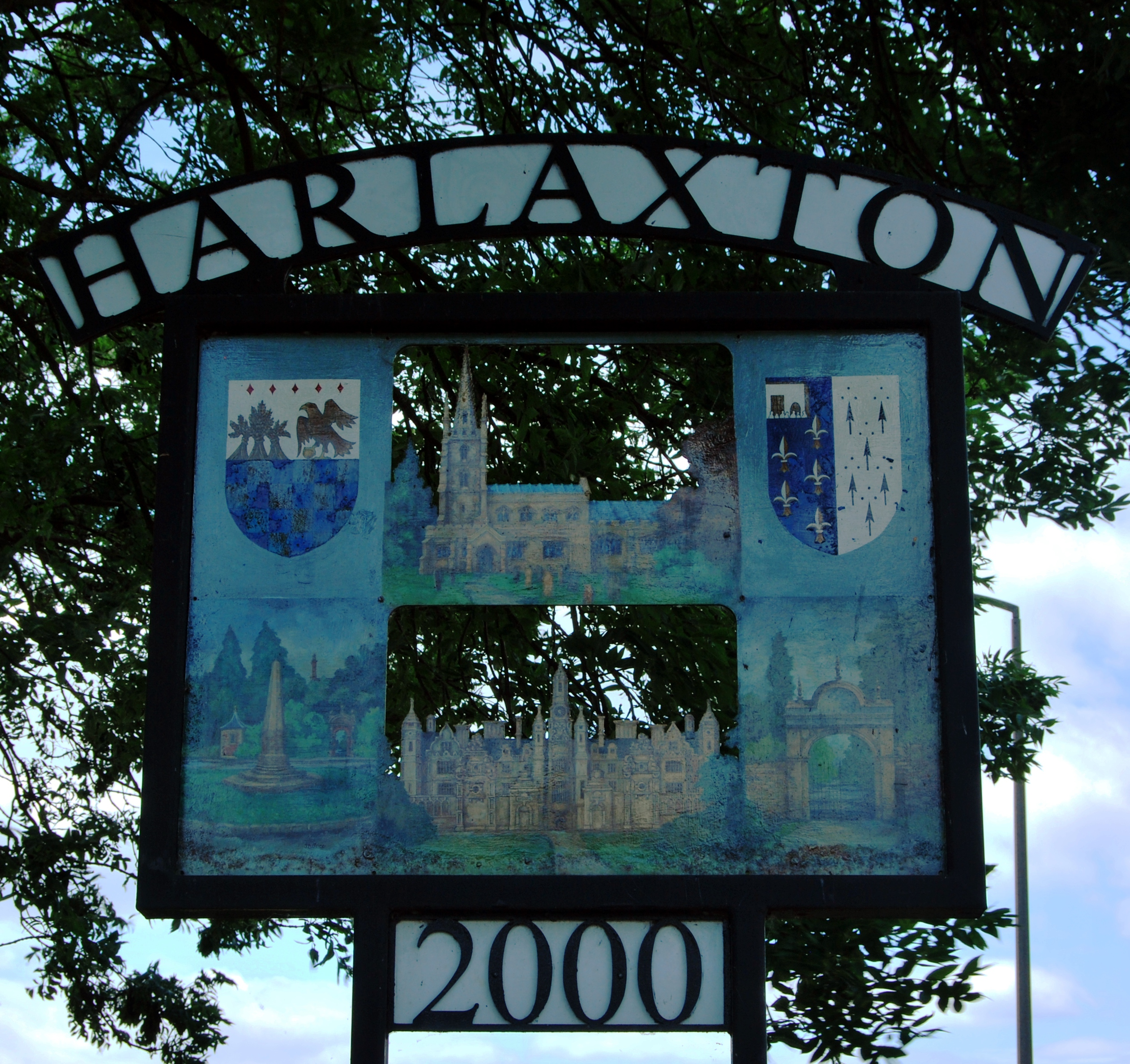
Harlaxton village sign

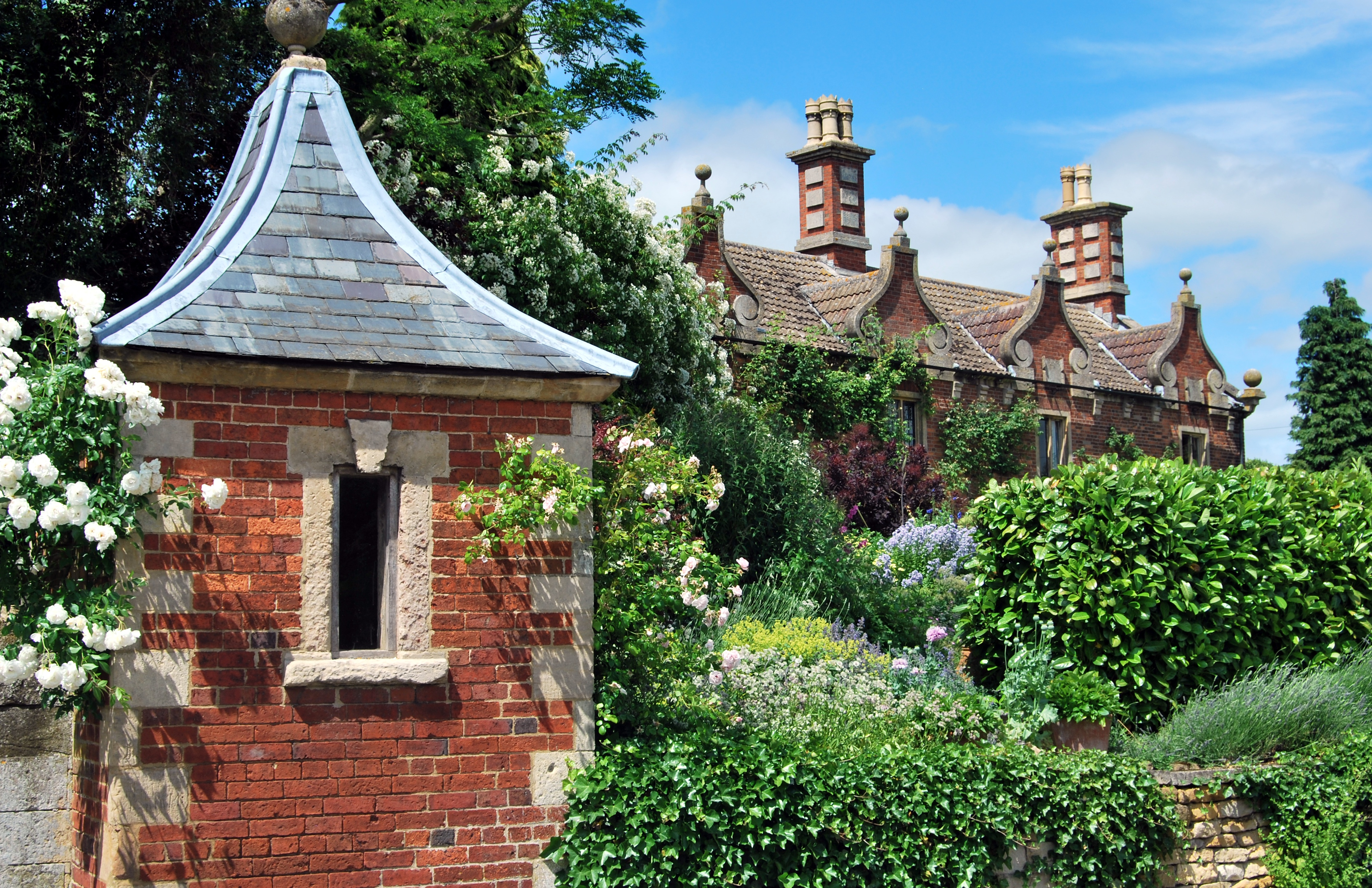
Coneygree and gazebo

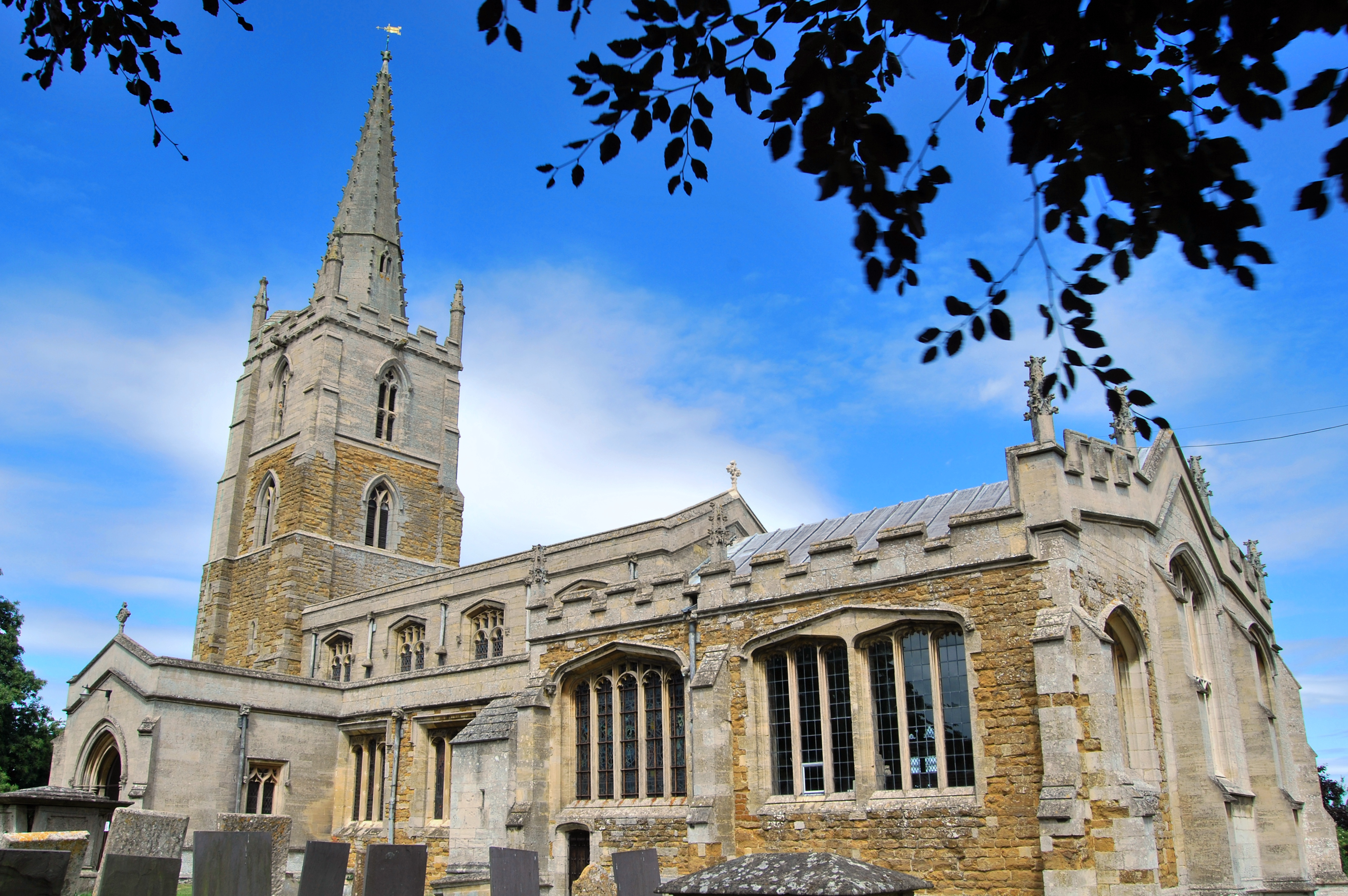
SS Mary and Peter's Church, Harlaxton

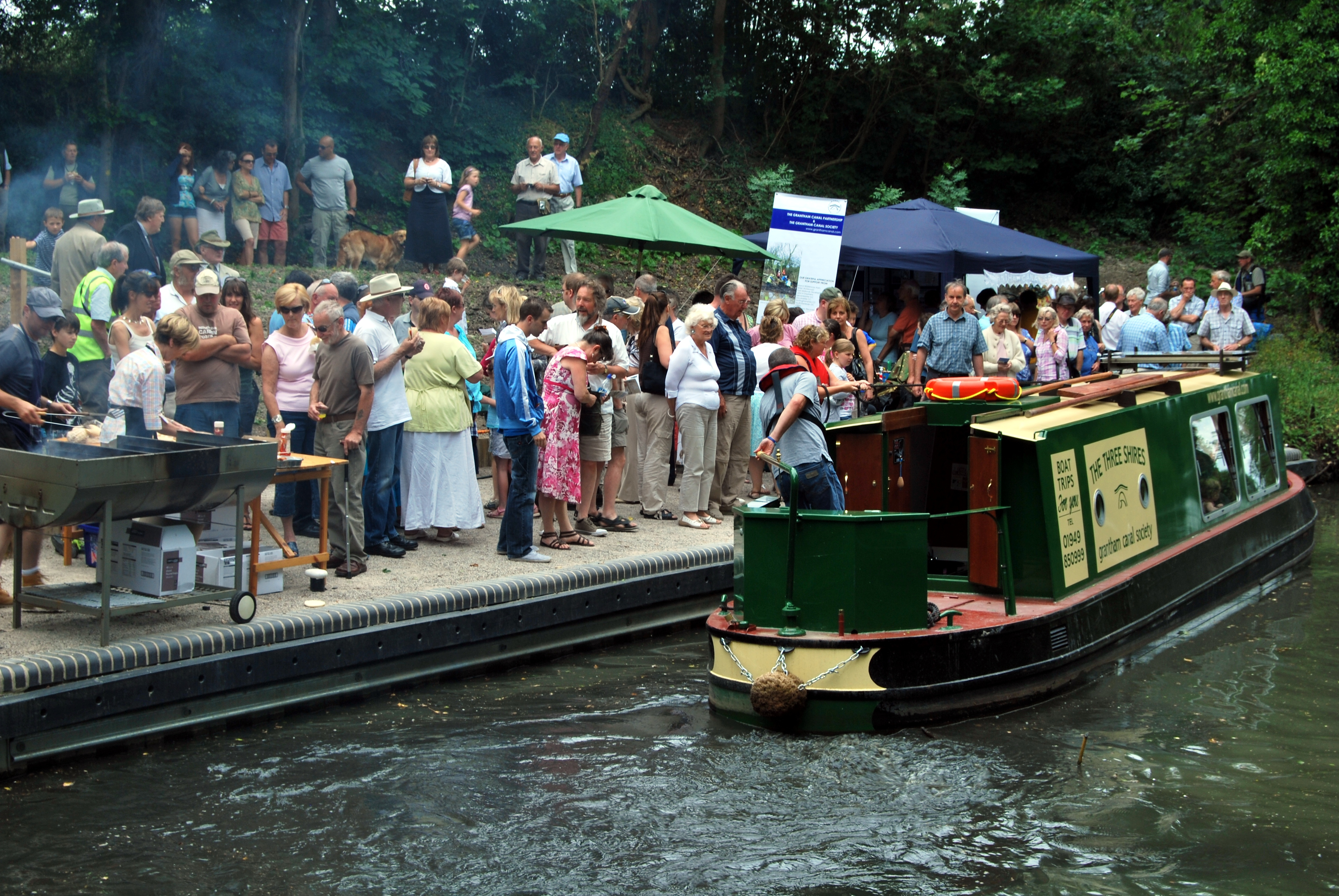
Narrowboat mooring at Harlaxton Wharf

Aerial photography has revealed that Harlaxton was the site of a unique Neolithic long barrow enclosure that formed a cursus, believed to have been made of multiple rows of standing wooden columns. Dilwyn Jones has speculated that the form of the complex indicates that Harlaxton was an important inter-regional link during the Neolithic period.

The village is mentioned in the 1086 Domesday Book as "Herlavestune". The name derives from the Old English Herelaf+tun, meaning "estate or farm of Herelaf". In 1740 a burial urn was uncovered in the village containing Roman coins. The history of Harlaxton village is tied to that of Harlaxton Manor.

The original manor house dated from the 14th century and stood south of the church off Rectory Lane where the original moat can still be seen in gardens there. It was used as a hunting lodge by John of Gaunt. It was purchased and occupied by the De Ligne family around 1475 eventually standing empty from 1780 until 1857 when it was pulled down. By this time the present Harlaxton Manor had been built some distance to the East of the village.

The life of the village was tied to that of the Lords of the Manor and the Estate, with many villagers employed by, and their houses and cottages tied to, the estate. This remained the case until 1937 when the estate was broken up. Many villagers had already found employment elsewhere by the time of the First World War, when transport improvements made this an option. Most of the older houses in the village were built by the De Ligne and Gregory families. The Nottingham to Grantham canal passes 1 mile (1.6 km) to the north of the village and was a source of commerce for the village in the early 19th century.

During the First World War a Royal Flying Corps aerodrome was constructed at the rear of the manor house. The airfield stood vacant between the wars but became RAF Harlaxton between 1942 and 1957, latterly operating as a relief landing ground for flying training units from RAF Cranwell.

Following the Second World War the village grew in size and population with small developments either side of the main Grantham to Melton Mowbray road. Although there was already the Golden Lion public house in the centre of the village, in the latter part of the 19th century the Gregory Arms was built by the Squire John Sherwin Gregory on what is now the A607 junction.

== Community ==
According to a 2004 village design statement to the South Kesteven District Council in response to redevelopment plans, residents were opposed to further housing development that could "alter the unique character of this conservation village". Harlaxton has a mixture of retired residents and young families, and is socially cohesive. Although close to amenities in Grantham, the statement also notes the village's post office, store, surgery, school, village hall and clubs, and that it is set in woodland, is surrounded by farmland, has habitat for wildlife and views of Belvoir Castle. In July 2010 the villagers joined supporters of the Grantham Canal Society in the reopening of the newly restored Harlaxton Wharf. The Grantham Canal Partnership has applied for Lottery Funding to restore two derelict locks as part of an Inland Waterway's Association skill training scheme.

The village now has a population of just over 700. There is a post office, church, primary school, doctor's surgery, village store and village hall. There is also a sports and social club and a bowls club.

== Landmarks ==
Harlaxton church is dedicated to St Mary and St Peter and is a Grade I listed building. It is of ironstone and limestone ashlar in Perpendicular style, with parts dating from the 12th century. The church has an early 14th-century buttressed tower and a font dating from around 1400. The south porch was re-built in 1856. John Oldrid Scott restored the interior in 1890–91. There is an alabaster memorial monument from c.1400, and further monuments to the De Ligne and Gregory families of the manor of Harlaxton.

After 1857 many of the buildings utilised building materials from the demolished manor house. Between 1758 and 1822 George De Ligne was responsible for the building and repair of much of the village including the rows of cottages on The Drift near the Nottingham to Grantham canal; his initials can be seen on the cottages. Originally wattle and daub, they were refinished by De Ligne in red brick as are many of the buildings in the village, with added embellishments of stonework. Thirty-six buildings in the village are Grade II listed. There are unusual architectural features in the older buildings including distinctive chimneys, rounded pillars and overstated porches and verandas. There are statues in gardens, listed gazebos, a duck pond, and substantial dry stone walls. Near the village store is a pillar on a double base known as the obelisk which could be the remains of a market cross. Piped water was not introduced until the 1940s and some of the wells previously used survive. One of the gateways to the original manor house still stands on Rectory Lane.

== Gallery ==
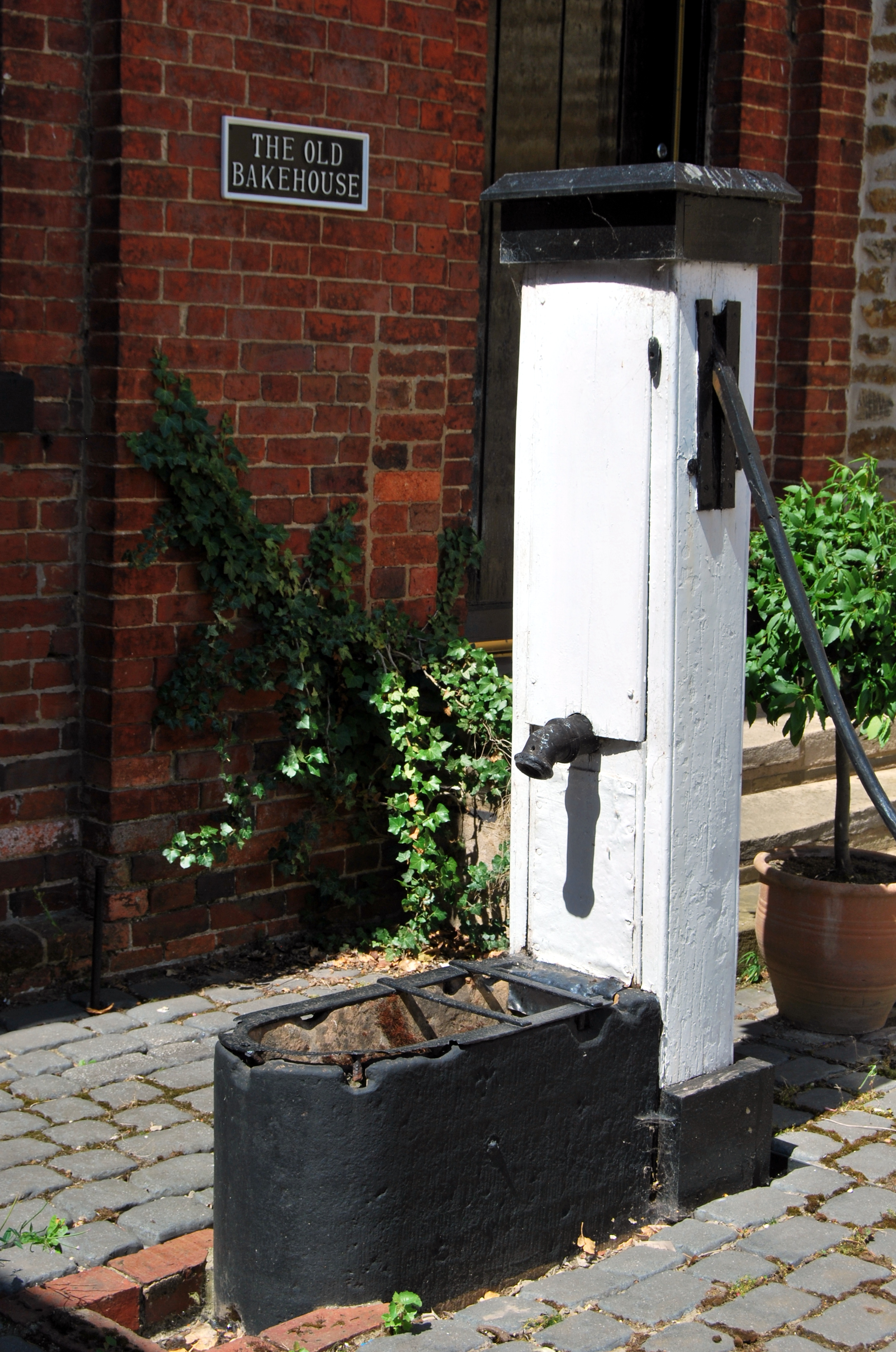
Harlaxton village pump

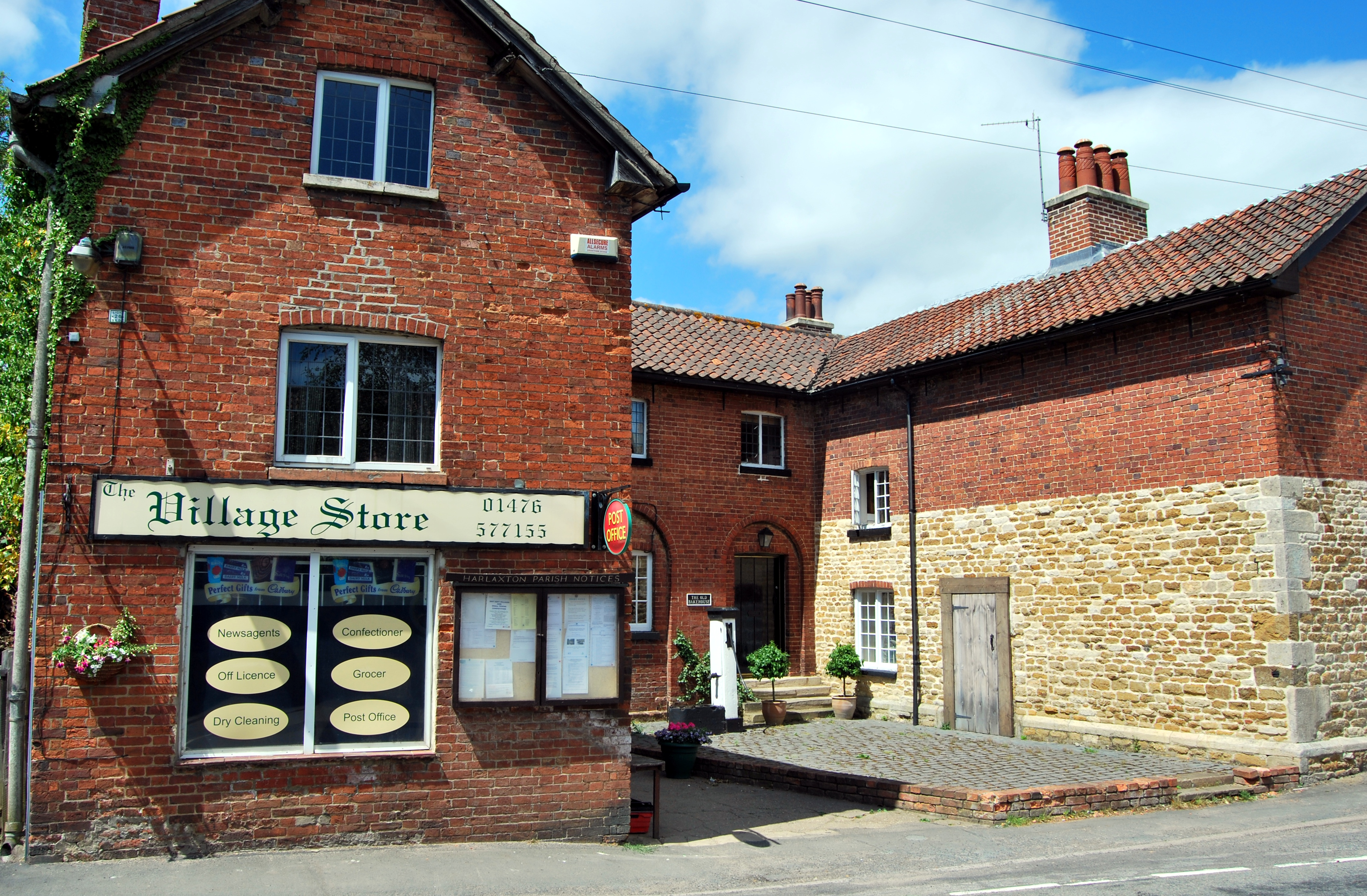
Village store and post office

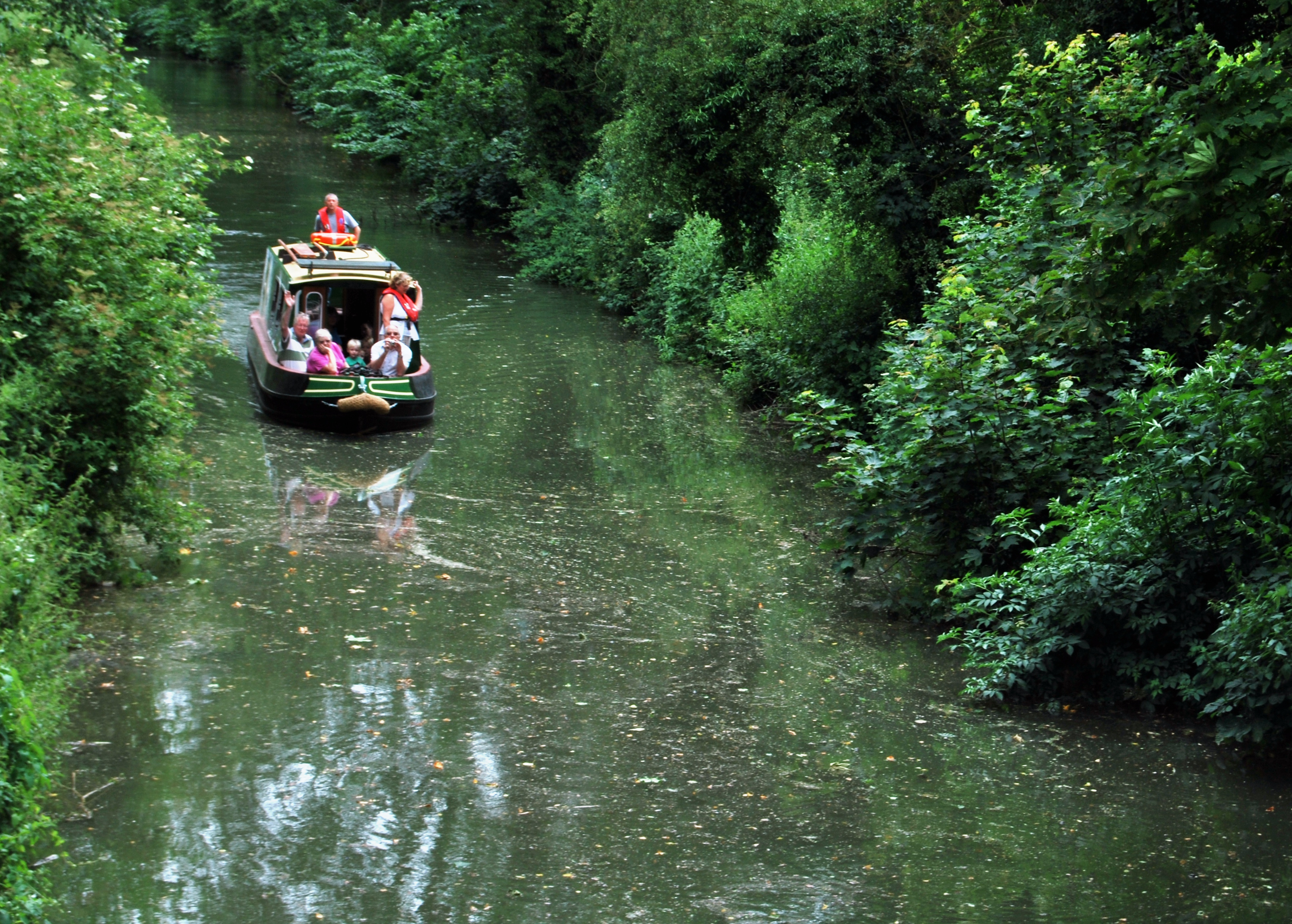
Narrowboat near Harlaxton

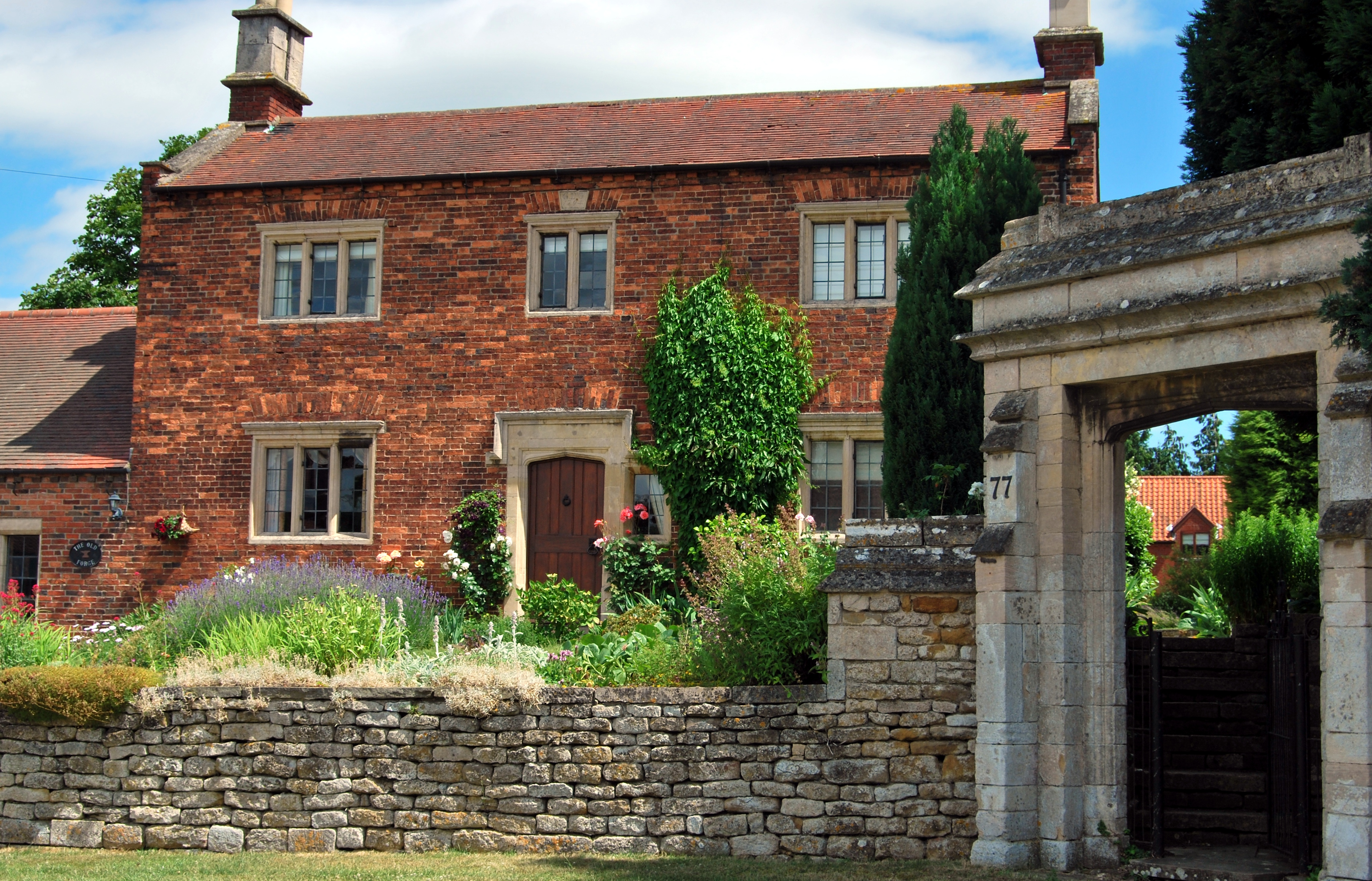
The Old Forge

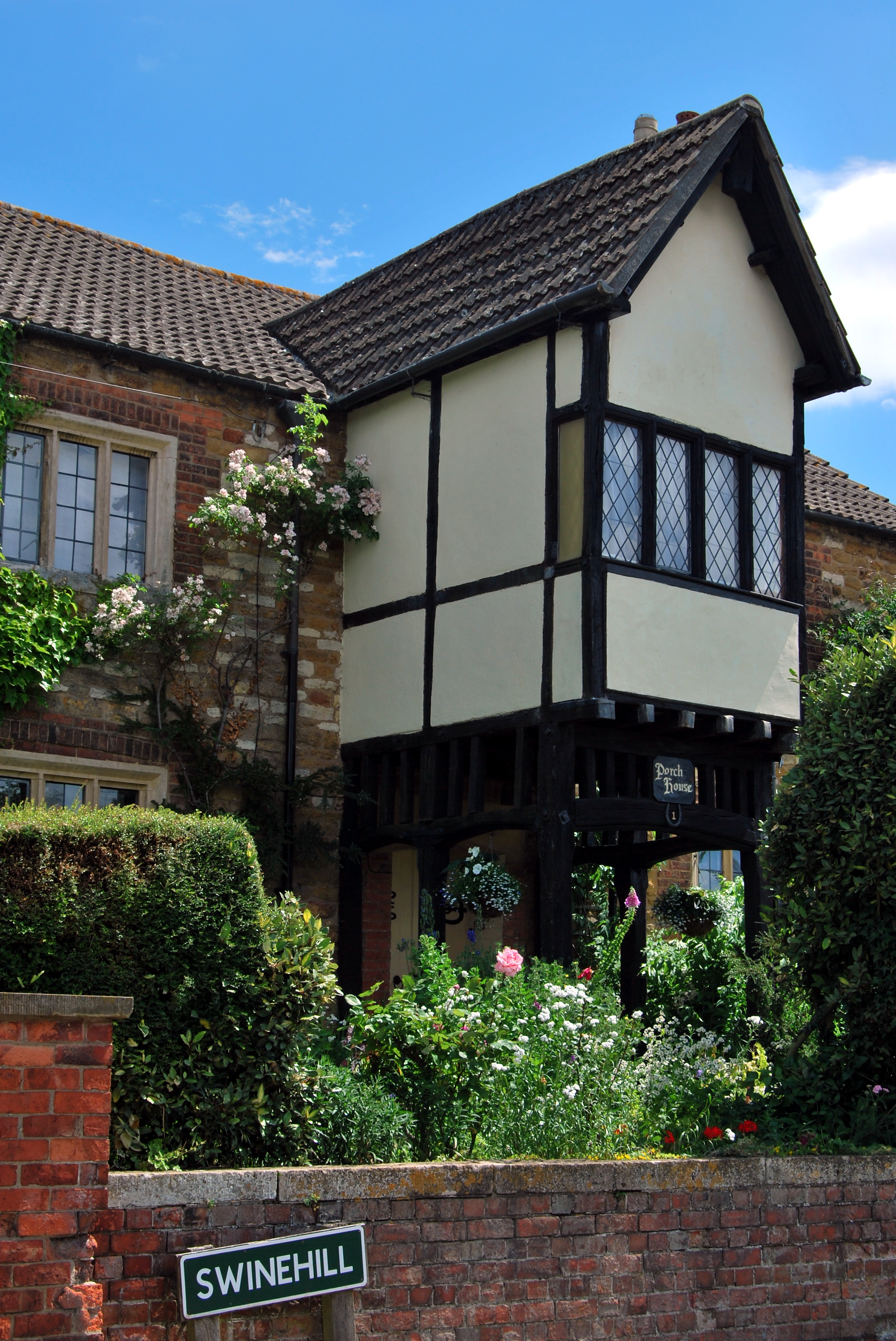
Porch House

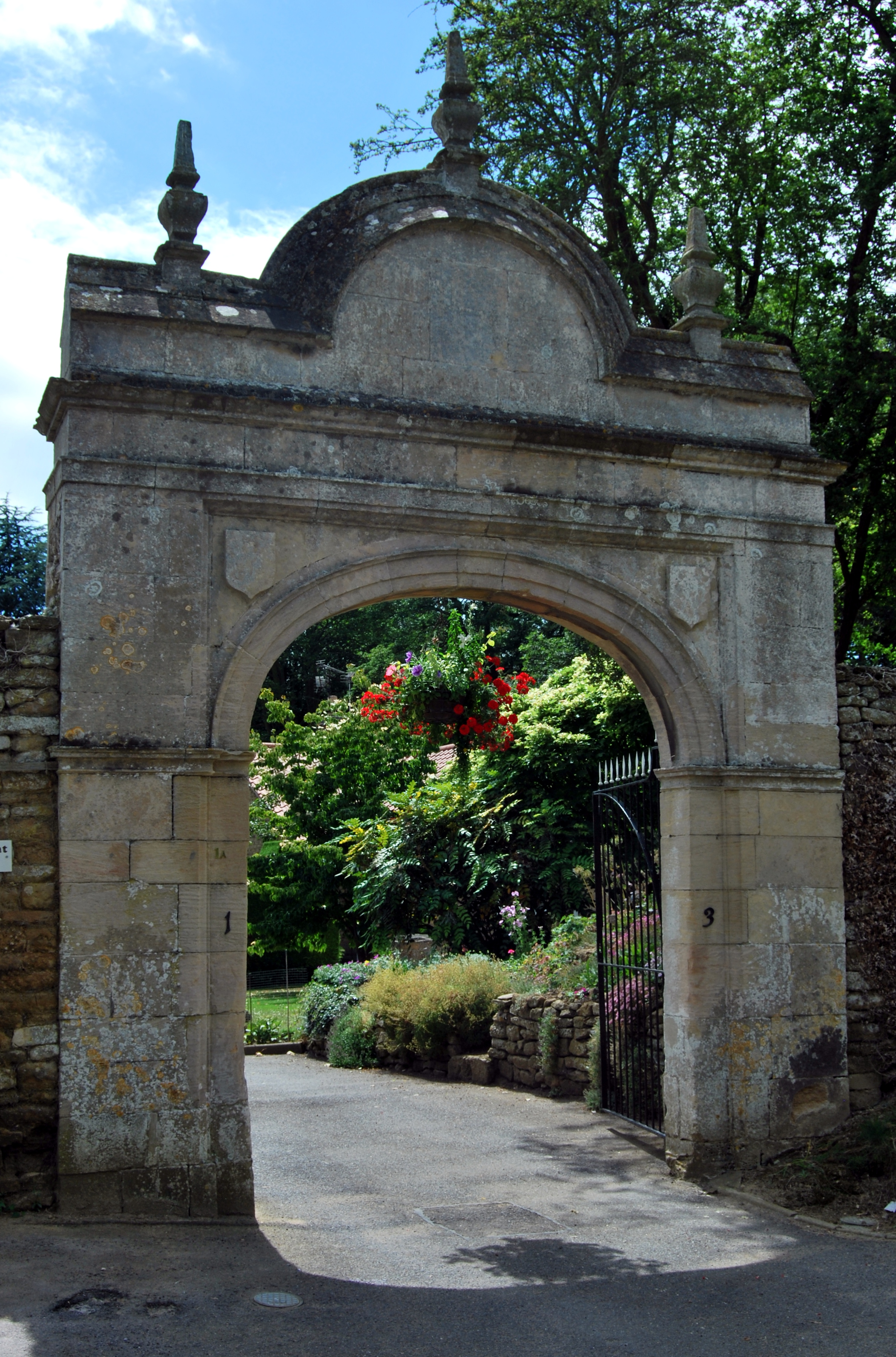
Old Manor House gates

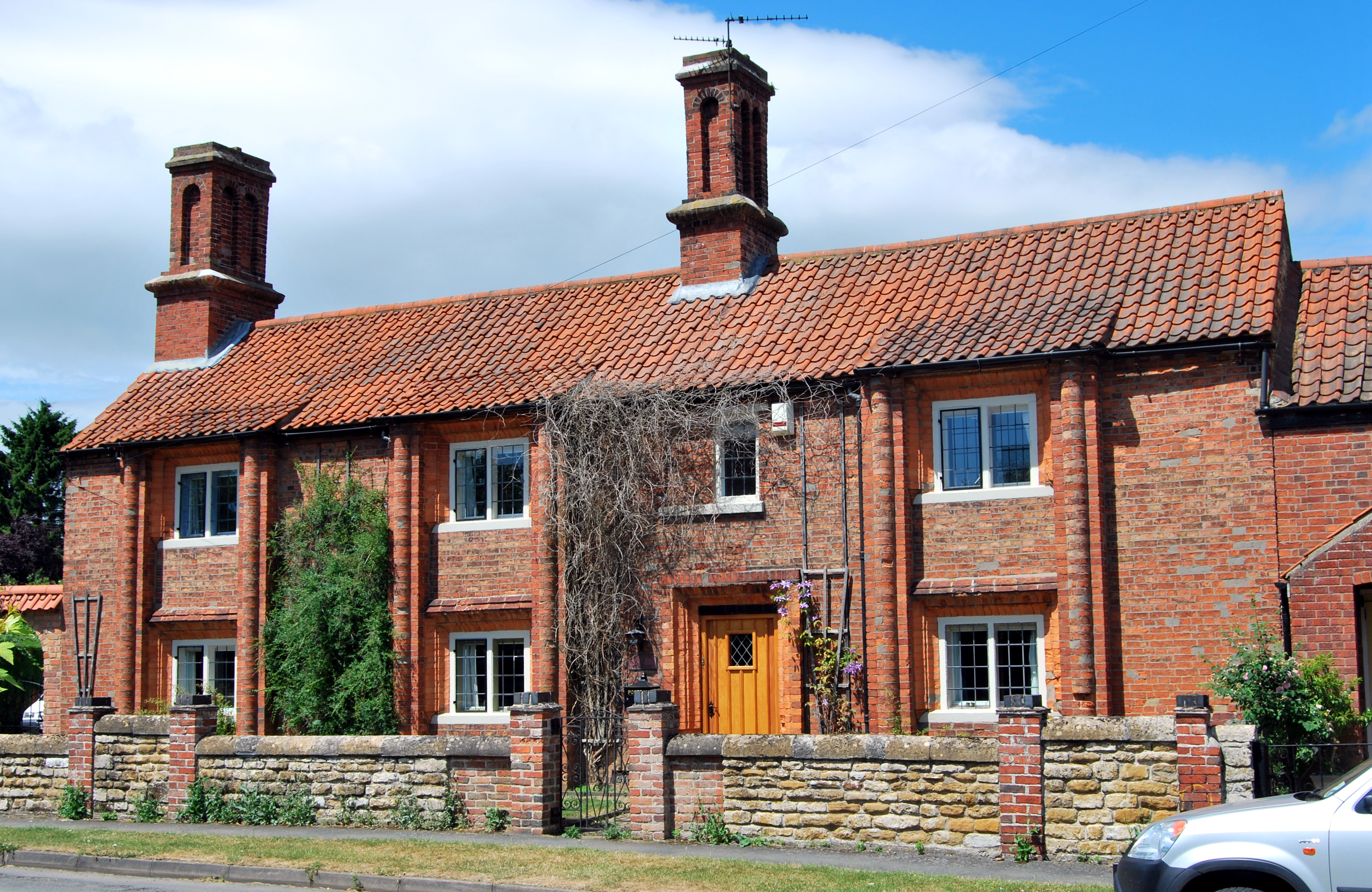
Harlaxton Old Farmhouse

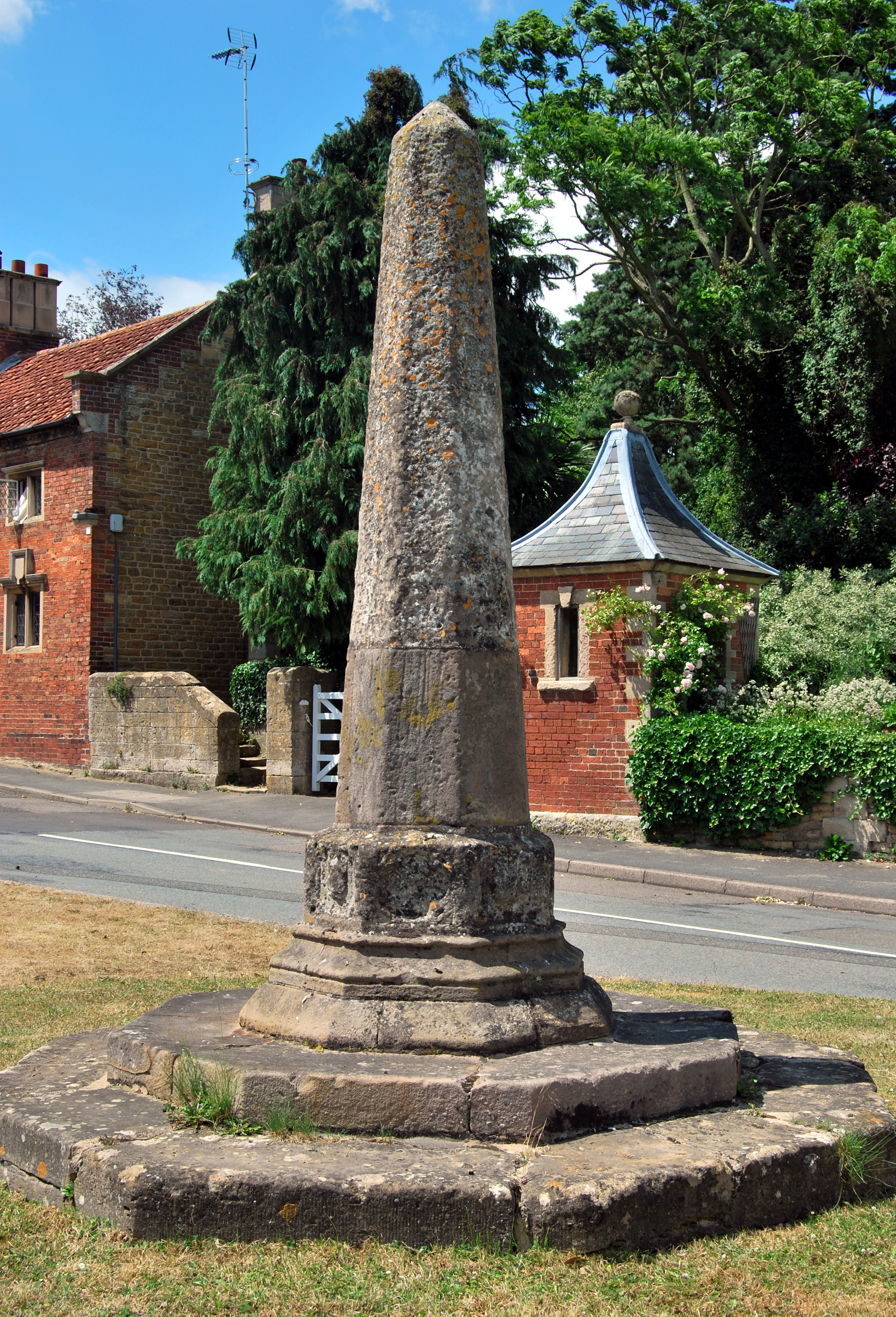
Harlaxton obelisk

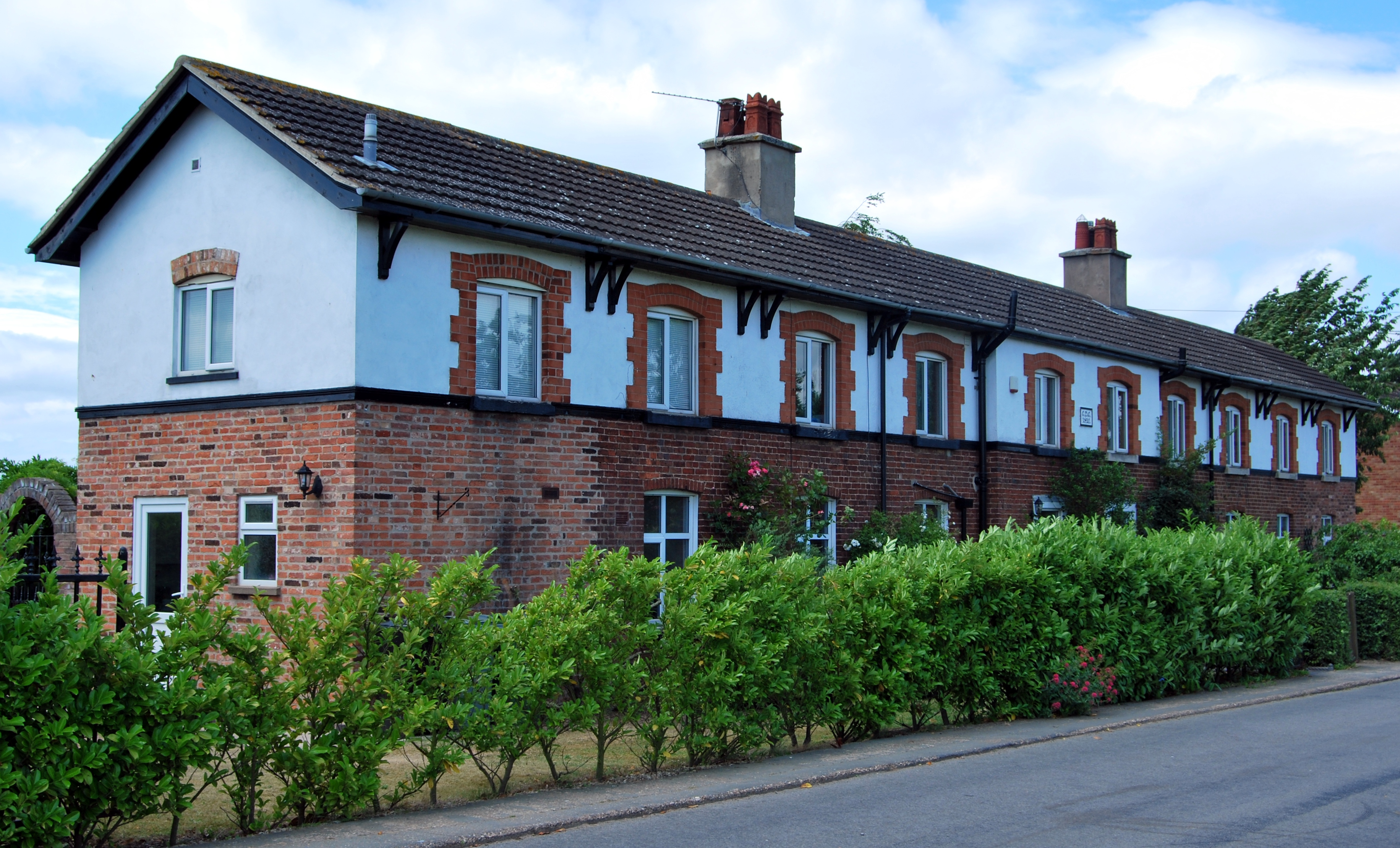
Gregory Cottages, The Drift

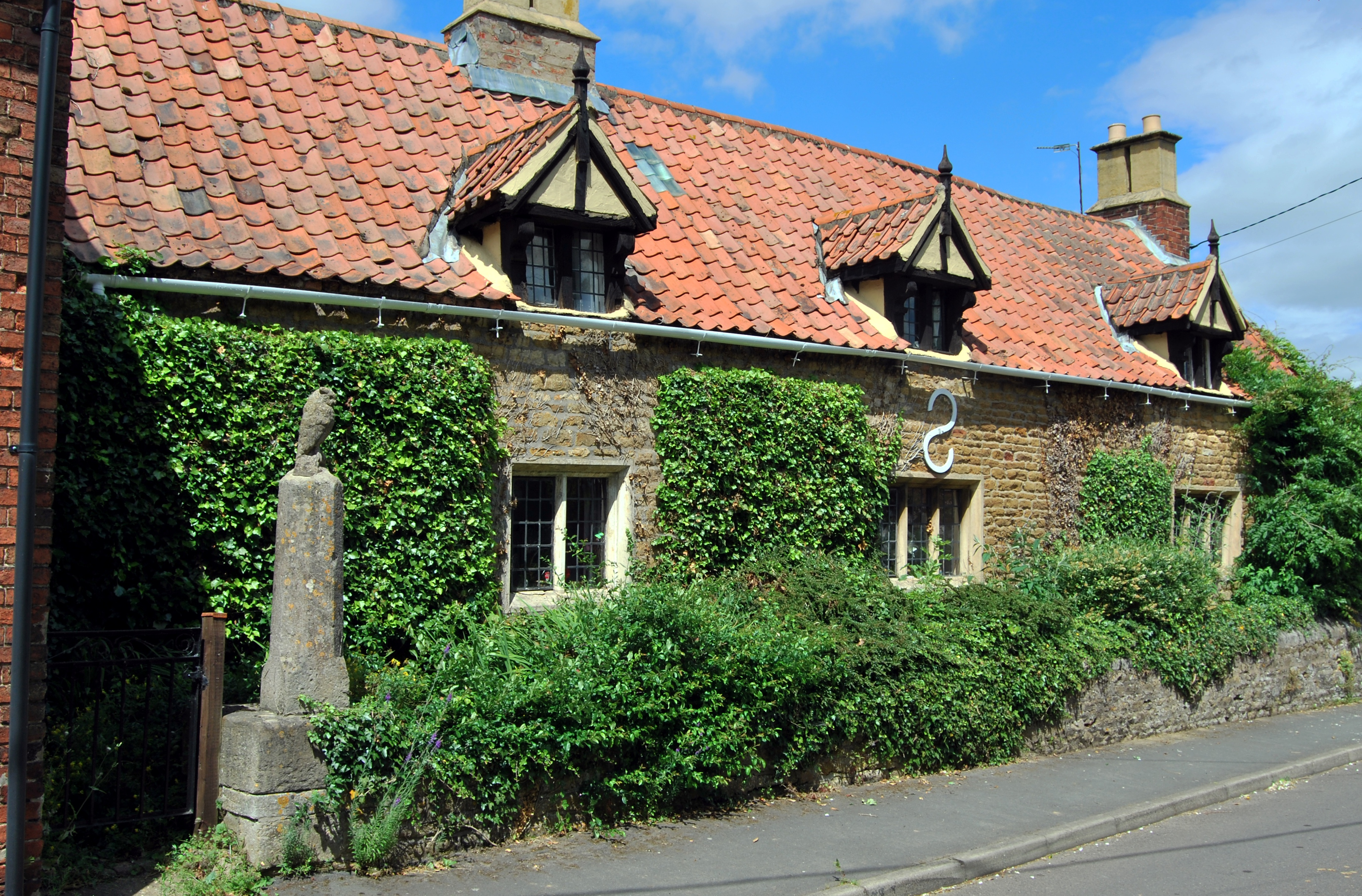
Harlaxton cottage with owl statue

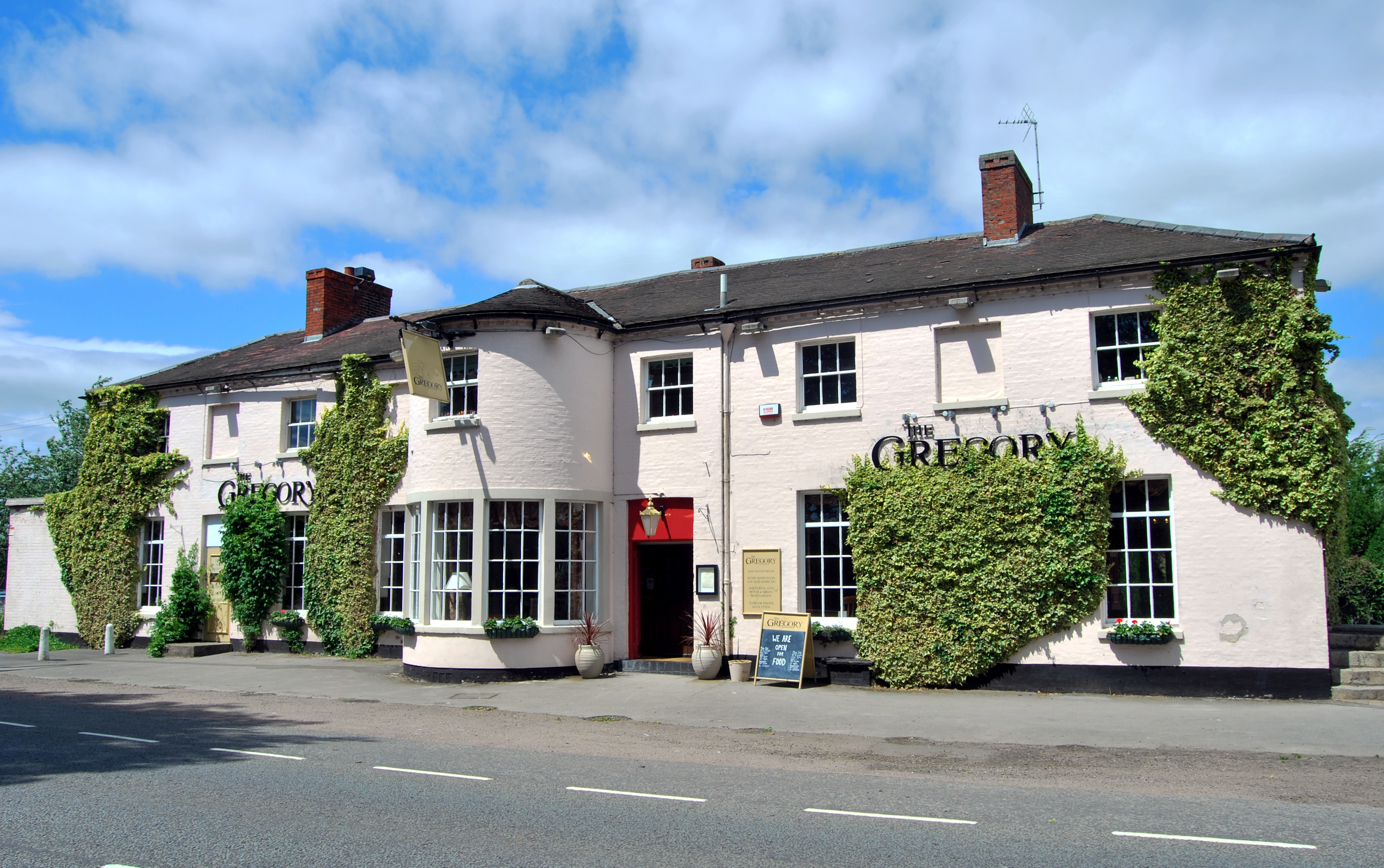
The Gregory Arms

== Sources ==
Harlaxton Design Statement http://parishes.lincolnshire.gov.uk/Files/216/DesignStatement4CMYK.pdf
