= List of work on castles and country houses by Anthony Salvin =

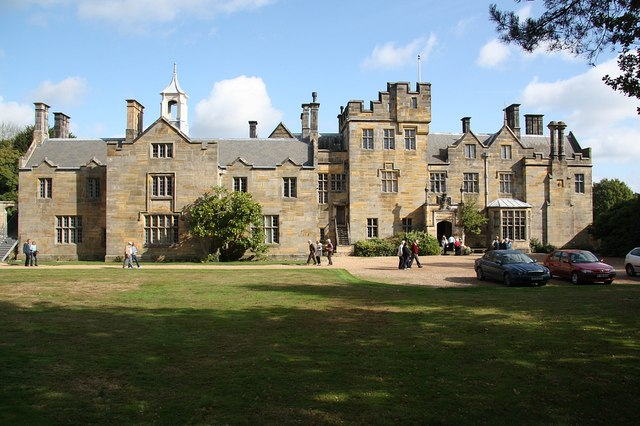
Scotney Castle, a new country house

Anthony Salvin (1799–1881) was an English architect, born in Sunderland Bridge, County Durham. He trained under John Paterson of Edinburgh and moved to London in 1821. His works include new churches, restoration of and additions to existing churches, and various other buildings, including schools. However, he is mainly noted for his work on existing major buildings, including castles, and for designing new substantial country houses. The castles on which he worked include Windsor Castle, Norwich Castle, Rockingham Castle, Newark Castle, Warkworth Castle, Muncaster Castle, and Warwick Castle. He also carried out work on the Tower of London, and on Trinity College, Cambridge, Gonville and Caius College, Cambridge, and University College, Durham. His new country houses include Mamhead House (his first major project), Harlaxton Manor, Scotney Castle, Keele Hall, Thoresby Hall, and Peckforton Castle. In addition he designed the Observatory for Durham University.

This list includes the work carried out by Salvin on castles and country houses, including alterations and amendments to existing buildings, and the design of new country houses.

== Key ==
Grade	Criteria
Grade I	Buildings of exceptional interest, sometimes considered to be internationally important.
Grade II*	Particularly important buildings of more than special interest.
Grade II	Buildings of national importance and special interest.
"—" denotes a work that is not graded.

== Works ==
Name	Location	Photograph	Date	Notes	Grade
Mamhead House	Mamhead, Devon; 50.6197°N 3.5133°W		1827–33	A country house, later Dawlish College. Also designed by Salvin, and listed separately at Grade II* are the stable yard and service buildings, and structures in the garden, namely the terrace wall, the terrace steps and urns, a sundial, and a pool with a fountain. A stone seat in the garden is listed at Grade II.	I
Dawlish Lodge	Mamhead, Devon; 50.6134°N 3.5121°W		1828–33	A lodge to Mamhead House.	II
Forest Gate	Mamhead, Devon; 50.6238°N 3.5032°W		1828–33	A lodge to Mamhead House.	II
Brancepeth Castle	Brancepeth, County Durham; 54.7338°N 1.6548°W		1829, 1864–75	Internal alterations.	I
Margaret House	Barley, Hertfordshire; 52.0266°N 0.0421°E		1831–33	A rectory to which Salvin made major additions. Later used as an old people's home.	II
Harlaxton Manor	Harlaxton, Lincolnshire52.8806°N 0.671°W		1831-37	A new country house, now the British campus of the University of Evansville.	I
Norwich Castle	Norwich, Norfolk; 52.6286°N 1.2963°E		1833	Refacing.	I
Heath Hall	Heath, Wakefield, West Yorkshire; 53.6768°N 1.4631°W		c. 1834	Salvin built up the wings, and added a billiard-room and a south porch to a country house dating from the 18th century.	I
Kimberley House	Kimberley, Norfolk; 52.6003°N 1.0854°E		1835	Added wings, that are joined to the house by quadrants.	II*
Chalfont Park House	Chalfont St Peter, Buckinghamshire; 51.5957°N 0.5456°W		1836	Remodelled.	II
Woodlands	Kenn, Devon; 50.6586°N 3.5262°W		1836	A house, remodelled by Salvin. Since used as a nursing home.	II
Scotney Castle	Lamberhurst, Kent; 51.0928°N 0.4083°E		1837–44	A new country house.	I
Rockingham Castle	Rockingham Forest, Northamptonshire; 52.5129°N 0.7240°W		1838	Remodelling of the west range. Built as a castle, since used as a country house.	I
Rudby Hall	Hutton Rudby, Skutterskelfe, North Yorkshire; 54.4568°N 1.2555°W		1838	For the 10th Viscount Falkland.	II*
Estate cottage	Belton, Lincolnshire; 52.9455°N 0.6190°W		1838	Remodelling of a 17th-century cottage, and the addition of a smithy, for the 1st Earl Brownlow. The cottage was later converted into a post office and house.	II
Keeper's Cottage	Belton, Lincolnshire; 52.9460°N 0.6176°W		c. 1838	Estate cottage; built for the 1st Earl Brownlow.	II
Rufford Abbey	Rufford, Nottinghamshire; 53.1761°N 1.0355°W		1838–40	Originating as a Cistercian abbey, it was later converted into a country house. Alterations made to it by Salvin; a gardener's cottage also designed by him and built at the same time is listed at Grade II.	I
Greystoke Castle	Greystoke, Cumbria; 54.6699°N 2.8769°W		1839–46; 1868	Alterations.	II*
Rectory	Denton, Lincolnshire; 52.8870°N 0.7144°W		1841	Two storey, five bay house with a hipped slate roof. Now a private residence.	II
Helmingham Hall	Helmingham, Suffolk; 52.1740°N 1.1964°E		c. 1841	Remodelled for John Tollemache.	I
Sherborne House	Sherborne, Gloucestershire; 51.8306°N 1.7563°W		c.1841	Interior decoration of the principal rooms.	II*
Kelham Hall	Kelham, Nottinghamshire; 53.0915°N 0.8451°W		1844–46	Service range. The rest of the house was built in 1859–61 by George Gilbert Scott.	I
Peckforton Castle	Peckforton Hills, Cheshire; 53.1175°N 2.6990°W		1844–50	A country house built in the style of a medieval castle for John Tollemache. The chapel within the ward of the castle, and the entrance lodge, both also designed by Salvin, are listed at Grade II*.	I
Naworth Castle	Near Brampton, Cumbria; 54.9560°N 2.6888°W		1844–51	Following a fire in 1844, Salvin restored the north and east ranges, and added the Morpeth Tower.	I
Hutton in the Forest Hall	Unthank, Skelton, Cumbria; 54.7140°N 2.8390°W		1845, 1871	Alterations to the hall. Salvin also designed the courtyard walls and stables; these are listed at Grade II.	I
Newark Castle	Newark, Nottinghamshire; 53.0778°N 0.8127°W		1845–48	Restoration of a building dating from the 12th century.	I
Oxon Hoath	West Peckham, Kent; 51.2452°N 0.3347°E		c. 1846	Remodelled.	II*
Penoyre House	Battle, Powys, 51.9689°N 3.4309°W		1846-48	Rebuilding for John Lloyd Vaughan Watkins.	II*
Stapeley House	Stapeley, Cheshire; 53.0505°N 2.4928°W		1847–48	Remodelled a house dating from 1778.	II
Derwent Island House	Derwent Water, Keswick, Cumbria; 54.5912°N 3.1449°W		1850	Extended to the east and west.	II
Sudbury Hall	Sudbury, Derbyshire; 52.8862°N 1.7657°W		c. 1850–53	Internal alterations.	I
Rose Castle	Dalston, Cumbria; 54.8065°N 2.9802°W		1851–52	A fortified house used as the residence of the bishops of Carlisle. Restoration of the Strickland Tower.	I
Warkworth Castle	Warkworth, Northumberland; 55.3457°N 1.6118°W		1853–58	Restoration of the keep.	I
Thornbury Castle	Thornbury, Gloucestershire; 51.6140°N 2.5301°W		1854	Restoration of a building dating from 1510 to 1511.	I
Alnwick Castle	Alnwick, Northumberland; 55.4158°N 1.7061°W		1854–65	Alterations, restoration and redecoration.	I
Cowes Castle	Cowes, Isle of Wight; 50.7665°N 1.3011°W		1856–58	Originated as a coastal defence port in 1539. Converted by Salvin into a club house for the Royal Yacht Squadron.	II*
Officers' Barracks, Dover Castle	Dover Castle, Dover, Kent; 51.1275°N 1.3244°E		1856–58	Officers’ Barracks designed in a Tudor Revival style.	II
Marbury Hall	Marbury, Cheshire; 53.2841°N 2.5261°W		1856–58	Remodelling of a country house; demolished in 1969.	
Keele Hall	Keele, Staffordshire; 52.9998°N 2.2704°W		1856–61	Total rebuilding of an earlier country house. Later used by Keele University.	II*
Mears Ashby Hall	Mears Ashby, Northamptonshire; 52.2895°N 0.7702°W		1859	Extended.	II*
Somerford Hall	Somerford, Cheshire		1859	Enlarged and altered. Demolished in 1927.	
Whitehall	Mealsgate, Cumbria; 54.7632°N 3.2420°W		1861	Alterations to a tower house dating from the 14th–15th century.	I
Muncaster Castle	Near Ravenglass, Cumbria; 54.3547°N 3.3808°W		1862–66	Enlarged and remodelled for the 4th Lord Muncaster.	I
Crossrigg Hall	Bolton, Cumbria; 54.6110°N 2.6117°W	Picture of Crossrigg Hall from gate at top of driveway	c. 1864	New country house.	II*
Thoresby Hall	Perlethorpe, Nottinghamshire; 53.2335°N 1.0450°W		1864–71	New country house for the 3rd Earl Manvers replacing an earlier house. Since used as a hotel. Structures in the grounds, also by Salvin, are listed at Grade II; these are the terrace walls and gazebos, and the stable court, stable cottages and riding school, and a fountain.	I
Capesthorne Hall	Siddington, Cheshire; 53.2517°N 2.2406°W		1865–68	Largely rebuilt after a fire in 1861.	II*
Ryston Hall	Ryston, Norfolk; 52.5838°N 0.3977°E		1867	Alterations to a country house dating from the 17th century.	II*
Hodnet Hall	Hodnet, Shropshire; 52.8523°N 2.5806°W		1867–71	Reduced in size in 1967–68.	
Dunster Castle	Dunster, Somerset; 51.1815°N 3.4438°W		1869–72	Extension and extensive remodelling.	I
Petworth House	Petworth, West Sussex; 50.9882°N 0.6110°W		1869–72	Remodelling of rooms and addition of an east porch.	I
Encombe House	Kingston, Devon; 50.6069°N 2.0798°W		c. 1870	Alterations and enlargement for the 3rd Earl of Eldon.	II*
Longford Castle	Wiltshire; 51.0391°N 1.7570°W		1870s	Restoration and additions to the country house. At about the same time Salvin made additions, including the clock tower, to the estate office, which is listed at Grade II.	I
Warwick Castle	Warwick; 52.2793°N 1.5850°W		1871	Restoration of the great hall and east wing following a fire.	I
Birdsall House	Birdsall, North Yorkshire; 54.0730°N 0.7558°W		1872	Addition of the right wing.	II*
Melbury House	Melbury Sampford, Dorset; 50.8519°N 2.6031°W		1872	Added the library and a connecting link to the house for the 5th Earl of Ilchester.	I
Verdley Place	Fernhurst, West Sussex; 51.0385°N 0.7136°W		1873–75	A country house for Charles Savile Roundell.	II
Haughton Castle	Humshaugh, Northumberland; 55.0507°N 2.1283°W		1876	Addition of the west wing.	I
Glassenbury Park House	Cranbrook, Kent; 51.1025°N 0.4940°E		1877–79	Remodelled.	II*
Hawksfold	Fernhurst, West Sussex; 51.0499°N 0.7289°W		1878–79	Built by Salvin for his own use.	II
Askerton Castle	Cumbria; 55.0159°N 2.7047°W		Undated	Alterations made.	I
Fawsley Hall	Fawsley, Northamptonshire; 52.2065°N 1.1787°W		Undated	A country house remodelled by Salvin. Since used as a hotel.	I
Langley Hall	Loddon, Norfolk; 52.5531°N 1.4674°E		Undated	Remodelling of a country house built in 1737. Since used as a school, known as Langley School.	I
Tower of London	Tower Hamlets, Greater London; 51.5081°N 0.0761°W		Various	Alterations, restorations and repairs. In 1863 added a pump house that is listed at Grade II.	I
Moreby Hall	Stillingfleet, North Yorkshire; 53.8818°N 1.0946°W		1827–1832	Added a conservatory.	II*
Cumberland Lodge	Windsor Great Park, Berkshire; 51.4339°N 0.6078°W		Undated	A country house enlarged by Salvin. Later used as a college.	II
Windsor Castle	Windsor, Berkshire; 51.4838°N 0.6030°W		Undated	Unspecified work.	I

== See also ==
- List of new churches by Anthony Salvin
- List of church restorations and alterations by Anthony Salvin
- List of miscellaneous works by Anthony Salvin
