= List of church restorations and alterations by Anthony Salvin =

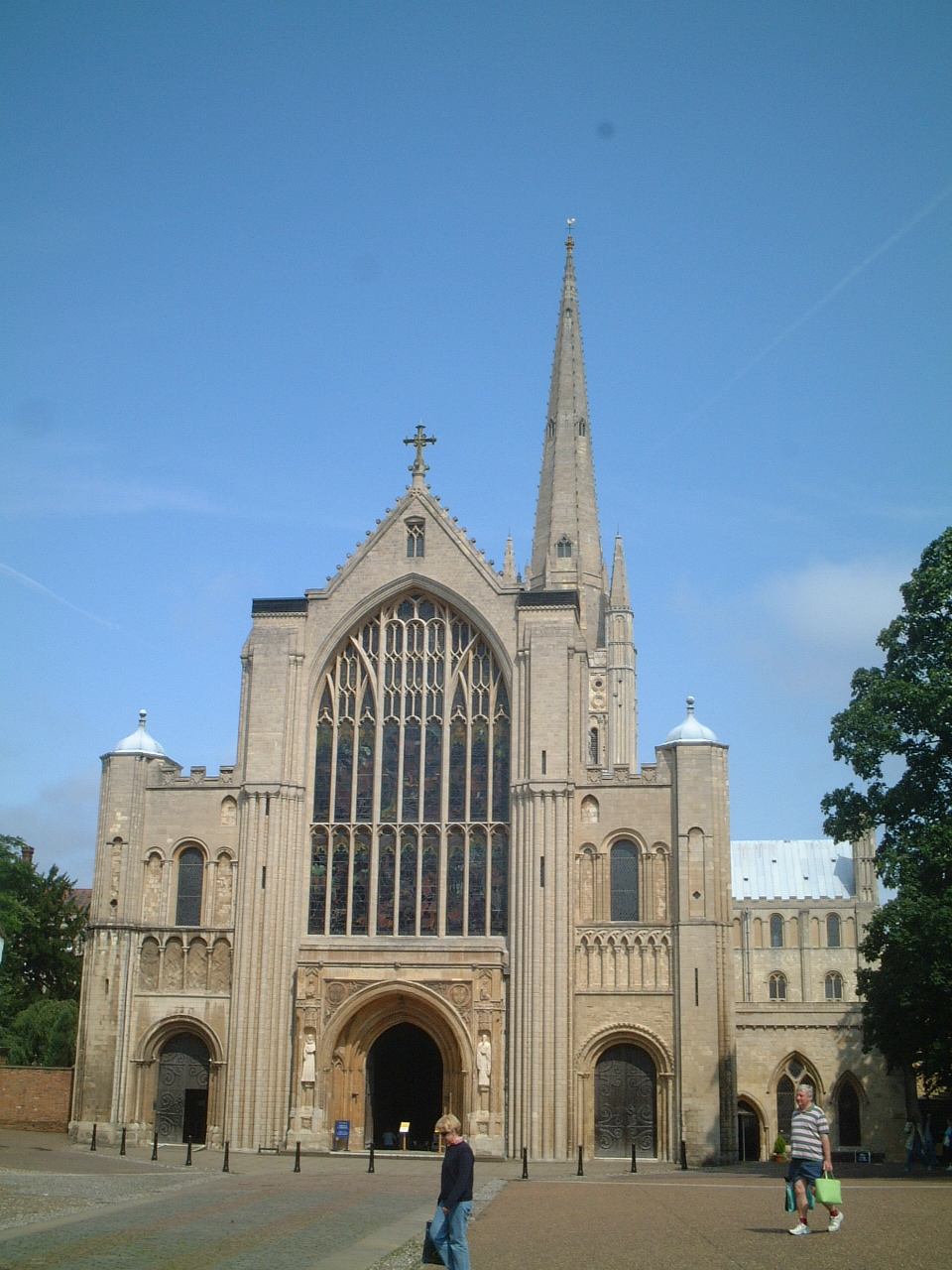
West front of Norwich Cathedral, remodelled in about 1830

Anthony Salvin (1799–1881) was an English architect, born in Sunderland Bridge, County Durham. He trained under John Paterson of Edinburgh, and moved to London in 1821. His works include new churches, restoration of and additions to existing churches, and various other buildings, including schools. However, he is mainly noted for his work on existing major buildings, including castles, and for designing new substantial country houses. The castles on which he worked include Windsor Castle, Norwich Castle, Rockingham Castle, Newark Castle, Warkworth Castle, Muncaster Castle, and Warwick Castle. He also carried out work on the Tower of London, and on Trinity College, Cambridge, Gonville and Caius College, Cambridge, and University College, Durham. His new country houses include Mamhead House (his first major project), Scotney Castle, Keele Hall, Thoresby Hall, and Peckforton Castle. In addition he designed the Observatory for Durham University.

Thus list contains details of churches with restorations, additions and alterations by Salvin.

== Key ==
| Grade | Criteria |
|---|---|
| Grade I | Buildings of exceptional interest, sometimes considered to be internationally important. |
| Grade II* | Particularly important buildings of more than special interest. |
| Grade II | Buildings of national importance and special interest. |
"—" denotes a work that is not graded.

== Works ==
| Name | Location | Photograph | Date | Notes | Grade |
|---|---|---|---|---|---|
| St Nectan's Church | Ashcombe, Devon; 50.6056°N 3.5386°W | | 1820s | Restoration of a church dating from the 13th century. | I |
| Norwich Cathedral | Norwich, Norfolk; 52.6319°N 1.3011°E | | c. 1830 | West front remodelled. | I |
| St Mary's Church | Helmingham, Suffolk; 52.1734°N 1.2025°E | | c. 1840 | Remodelled. | II |
| Holy Sepulchre Church | Cambridge; 52.2084°N 0.1189°E | | 1841 | Restoration and partial rebuilding of a church dating from the 12th century. | I |
| St Oswald's Church | Arncliffe, North Yorkshire; 54.1437°N 2.1039°W | | 1841–43 | Restoration of the nave in 1841, and rebuilding of the chancel in 1843. | II |
| St Margaret's Church | Stratton St Margaret, Swindon51.5824°N 1.7422°W | | 1845–46 | Restoration including partial rebuilding of the clerestory and tower. | I |
| St Peter's Church | Elford, Staffordshire; 52.6928°N 1.7275°W | | 1848–49 | Church largely rebuilt. | II* |
| St Andrew's Church | Greystoke, Cumbria; 54.6691°N 2.8645°W | | 1848–49 | Restoration of a church dating from the 13th century. | II* |
| St Lawrence's Church | Castle Rising, Norfolk; 52.7957°N 0.4701°E | | c. 1849 | Restoration of a church dating from the 12th century. | I |
| Wells Cathedral | Wells, Somerset; 51.2104°N 2.6437°W | | c. 1850 | Restoration of the choir. | I |
| St Oswald's Church | Lower Peover, Cheshire; 53.2639°N 2.3864°W | | 1852 | Aisles altered and re-roofed. | I |
| St Mary the Virgin's Church | Aldridge, West Midlands; 52.6044°N 1.9126°W | | 1852–53 | Extensive restoration of a church dating from the 14th century, with rebuilding of the north aisle and chancel. | II* |
| St Philip and St James' Church | Rock, Northumberland; 55.4755°N 1.6817°W | | 1855 | Restoration and rebuilding of a church dating from the 12th century, with a new bellcote, vestry and apse. | II* |
| St Mary's Church | Weaverham, Cheshire; 53.2638°N 2.5758°W | | 1855 | Restoration of a church dating from the 15th century. | I |
| St Mary's Church | Flixton, Suffolk; 52.4293°N 1.3995°E | | 1856 | Replaced the tower. | II* |
| Church of St Mary the Great | Cambridge; 52.2053°N 0.1183°E | | 1857 | Restoration of a church dating from the 14th century. | I |
| All Saints Church | Sherburn-in-Elmet, North Yorkshire; 53.7958°N 1.2606°W | | 1857 | Restoration of the east end. | I |
| Durham Cathedral | Durham; 54.7732°N 1.5765°W | | 1858 | Restoration of cloisters. | I |
| St Margaret's Church | Fernhurst, West Sussex; 51.0489°N 0.7190°W | | 1859; 1881 | Restoration and rebuilding of a church dating from the 12th century. The 1881 work was one of Salvin's last commissions. | II |
| St Mary's Church | Whickham, Tyne and Wear; 54.9464°N 1.6741°W | | 1860–62 | Restoration of a church dating from the 12th century, with the addition of a second north aisle, vestry, organ chamber, and a new roof. | I |
| St Mary and St Michael's Church | Alnwick, Northumberland; 55.4169°N 1.7112°W | | c. 1863 | Restoration of a church dating mainly from the 15th century. | II |
| St Mungo's Church | Simonburn, Northumberland; 55.0564°N 2.2037°W | | 1863–64 | Chancel rebuilt. | II* |
| St Swithin's Church | Newnham, Hampshire; 51.2720°N 1.0025°W | | 1865 | Restoration of a church dating from the 12th century. | I |
| Royal Chapel of All Saints | Windsor Great Park, Windsor Berkshire; 51.4397°N 0.6049°W | Royal Chapel of All Saints, Windsor Great Park | 1866 | A new south aisle. | II |
| St James' Church | Unthank, Skelton, Cumbria; 54.7201°N 2.8406°W | | 1867–68 | Restoration of a church dating from 1714. | II |
| St John the Baptist's Church | Stanwick St John, North Yorkshire; 54.5029°N 1.7156°W | | 1868 | Restoration of a church dating from the 13th century. | I |
| St Nicholas' Church | Worth, Crawley, West Sussex; 51.1103°N 0.1415°W | | 1871 | Salvin added the tower and spire to a church of Saxon origin. | I |
| St Michael's Church | Haselbech, Northamptonshire; 52.3892°N 0.9556°W | | 1872 | Added north chapel. | II* |
| St Michael and All Angels Church | Ravenglass, Cumbria; 54.3568°N 3.3804°W | | 1874 | Restoration of a church dating from the 16th century with the addition of the north transept. In the grounds of Muncaster Castle. Salvin also designed the parsonage. | I |
| St Michael's Church | Northchapel, West Sussex; 51.0561°N 0.6427°W | | 1877 | Other than the west tower, which dates from earlier in the 19th century. | II |
| St Mary's Church | Astbury, Cheshire; 53.1507°N 2.2314°W | | Undated | Restoration of a church dating from the 12th century. | I |
| St Mary and All Saints' Church | Great Budworth, Cheshire; 53.2935°N 2.5043°W | | Undated | Refurnishing. | I |
| All Saints' Church | Freethorpe, Norfolk; 52.5929°N 1.5562°E | | Undated | Restoration of a church dating from the 12th century. | I |

== See also ==
- List of new churches by Anthony Salvin
- List of work on castles and country houses by Anthony Salvin
- List of miscellaneous works by Anthony Salvin
