= List of miscellaneous works by Anthony Salvin =

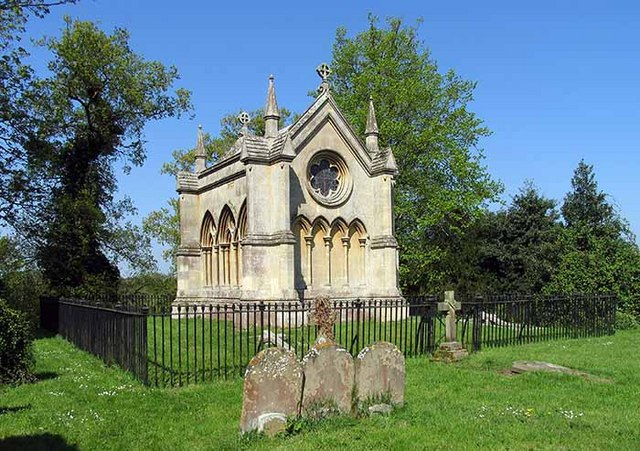
Trafford Mausoleum, Wroxham

Anthony Salvin (1799–1881) was an English architect, born in Sunderland Bridge, County Durham. He trained under John Paterson of Edinburgh, and moved to London in 1821. His works include new churches, restoration of and additions to existing churches, and various other buildings, including schools. However, he is mainly noted for his work on existing major buildings, including castles, and for designing new substantial country houses. The castles on which he worked include Windsor Castle, Norwich Castle, Rockingham Castle, Newark Castle, Warkworth Castle, Muncaster Castle, and Warwick Castle. He also carried out work on the Tower of London, and on Trinity College, Cambridge, Gonville and Caius College, Cambridge, and University College, Durham. His new country houses include Mamhead House (his first major project), Scotney Castle, Keele Hall, Thoresby Hall, and Peckforton Castle. In addition he designed the Observatory for Durham University.

This list contains buildings and structures not included in the See also section (below).

== Key ==
Grade	Criteria
Grade I	Buildings of exceptional interest, sometimes considered to be internationally important.
Grade II*	Particularly important buildings of more than special interest.
Grade II	Buildings of national importance and special interest.
"—" denotes a work that is not graded.

== Works ==
Name	Location	Photograph	Date	Notes	Grade
School	Belton, Lincolnshire; 52.9458°N 0.6178°W	Old School, Belton (geograph 4775318)	1826, 1838	An estate school for workers on the Belton House estate, built for the 1st Earl Brownlow.	II
Village Cross	Belton, Lincolnshire; 52.9458°N 0.6175°W	Village Cross, Belton (geograph 3657441)	1838	For the 1st Earl Brownlow.	II
Boathouse at Belton House	Belton, Lincolnshire; 52.9432°N 0.6102°W	Boathouse at Belton House, by Anthony Salvin	1838–39	In the style of a Swiss chalet; for the 1st Earl Brownlow.	II
Greyhound Lodge	Belton, Lincolnshire; 52.9462°N 0.6168°W	Greyhound Lodge, Main Street, Belton, Lincs. (geograph 4775384)	1839	Public house; built for 1st Earl Brownlow. Later converted into a house.	II
Former Post Office and Smithy	Belton, Lincolnshire; 52.9454°N 0.619°W	Old Post Office and Smithy, Main Street, Belton, Lincs. (geograph 2422451)	1839	Former post office and smithy. Later converted into a house.	II
Dial Cottage	Belton, Lincolnshire; 52.947°N 0.6164°W	Dial Cottage, Main Street, Belton, Lincs. (geograph 7499477)	1849	Estate cottage, built 1849.	II
Trafford Mausoleum, Wroxham	St Mary's Churchyard, Wroxham, Norfolk; 52.7069°N 1.3977°E		c. 1830	Mausoleum.	II
Gatehouse	Harlaxton Manor, Harlaxton, Lincolnshire; 52.8831°N 0.6762°W	Gateway lodge on road to Harlaxton College (geograph 6279044)	c. 1832–38		II*
Observatory	Durham University; 54.7683°N 1.5861°W		1839–40		II
University College	Durham University; 54.7754°N 1.5756°W		1839–40	Salvin rebuilt the keep of Durham Castle to provide accommodation for students.	I
York County Savings Bank	Grantham, Lincolnshire; 52.9124°N 0.6418°W	York County Savings Bank, 14 Finkin Street (geograph 3607514)	1841	14 Finkin Street, constructed in an “ornate” Jacobethan style.	II
Trinity College	Cambridge; 52.2069°N 0.1169°E		1841–43, 1852, 1856–60, 1865–68	Remodelling, rebuilding and refacing work, additions of new courts.	I
Monument to Grace Darling	St Aidan's Churchyard, Bamburgh, Northumberland; 55.6079°N 1.7192°W		1842	Funerary monument to Grace Darling. Much reconstructed due to storm damage and weathering of the stonework.	II*
Pardes House School (now Bobath Centre)	Finchley, Barnet, Greater London; 51.5895°N 0.1652°W	Bobath Centre - geograph.org.uk - 158013	c. 1847	Formerly Holy Trinity Church of England School.	II
Hotel	Carlisle, Cumbria; 54.8912°N 2.9329°W		1852	Built as the County and Station Hotel. Since then has had a variety of titles, as of 2011 the Lakes Court Hotel.	II
St Michael's School	Highgate, Haringey, Greater London; 51.5737°N 0.1512°W		1852	A primary Church of England school.	II
Gonville and Caius College	Cambridge; 52.2060°N 0.1171°E		1853	Alterations.	I
Coach house	Allhallows, Cumbria; 54.7632°N 3.2419°W		1861	Coach house and stables for Whitehall.	II
Pump house	Tower of London, London; 51.50802°N 0.07890°W		1863	Now a Tower of London gift shop.	II
Barclays Bank	Great Yarmouth, Norfolk; 52.6073°N 1.7242°E	14 and 15 Hall Quay (geograph 5941712)	1865	15 Hall Quay is the brick building to the right. Salvin remodelled it and added a new façade.	II
Estate office	Petworth House, Petworth, West Sussex; 50.9879°N 0.6104°W		1868–72	Enlargement of a building dating from the 18th century, with a connection to the house by a porte-cochère.	II
Worth Abbey School	Turners Hill, West Sussex; 51.0921°N 0.1193°W	Worth School and Abbey	1869–72	Built as a Roman Catholic school, and known as Worth Abbey.	II
Public library	Great Yarmouth, Norfolk; 52.6072°N 1.7243°E		Undated	Salvin's building is the white-fronted building on the left of the photograph. Now used as a shop and offices.	II

== See also ==
- List of new churches by Anthony Salvin
- List of church restorations and alterations by Anthony Salvin
- List of work on castles and country houses by Anthony Salvin
