= List of new churches by Anthony Salvin =

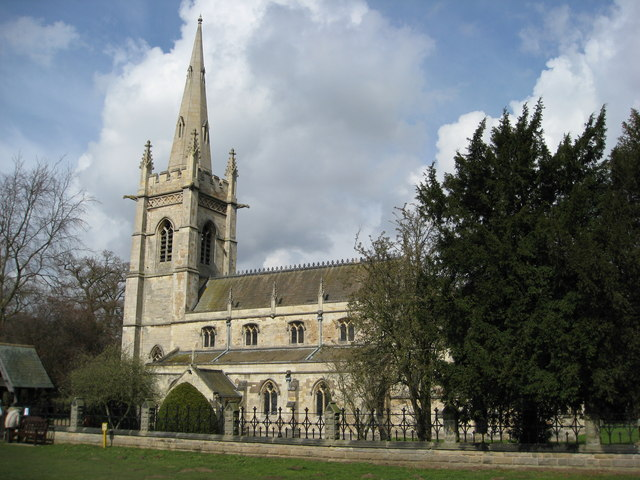
St John's Church, Perlethorpe

Anthony Salvin (1799–1881) was an English architect, born in Sunderland Bridge, County Durham. He trained under John Paterson of Edinburgh, and moved to London in 1821. His works include new churches, restoration of and additions to existing churches, and various other buildings, including schools. However, he is mainly noted for his work on existing major buildings, including castles, and for designing new substantial country houses. The castles on which he worked include Windsor Castle, Norwich Castle, Rockingham Castle, Newark Castle, Warkworth Castle, Muncaster Castle, and Warwick Castle. He also carried out work on the Tower of London, and on Trinity College, Cambridge, Gonville and Caius College, Cambridge, and University College, Durham. His new country houses include Mamhead House (his first major project), Scotney Castle, Keele Hall, Thoresby Hall, and Peckforton Castle. In addition he designed the Observatory for Durham University.

This list includes the new churches designed by Salvin.

== Key ==
Grade	Criteria
Grade I	Buildings of exceptional interest, sometimes considered to be internationally important.
Grade II*	Particularly important buildings of more than special interest.
Grade II	Buildings of national importance and special interest.
"—" denotes a work that is not graded.

== Works ==
Name	Location	Photograph	Date	Notes	Grade
Holy Trinity Church	Ulverston, Cumbria; 54.1938°N 3.0979°W		1829–32	A Commissioners' church; closed in 1975; subsequently used as a sports centre, then for social housing.	II
St John's Church	Shildon, County Durham; 54.6326°N 1.6470°W		1833–34	Salvin designed the nave; the church was largely rebuilt later in the 19th century.	II
St Paul's Church	North Sunderland, Northumberland; 55.5763°N 1.6653°W		1834		II
Holy Trinity Church	Darlington, County Durham; 54.5279°N 1.5640°W	Darlington, Holy Trinity (geograph 6360815)	1836–38		II*
St John's Church	Keswick, Cumbria; 54.5985°N 3.1347°W		1836–38		II*
Christ Church	Kilndown, Kent; 51.0908°N 0.4270°E		1838–41		I
St John the Evangelist's Church	Spittlegate, Grantham, Lincolnshire; 52.9067°N 0.6393°W		1840–41	Built under the patronage of Lady Brownlow and with a contribution from Queen Adelaide.	II
St Mary's Church	Sand Hutton, North Yorkshire; 54.0185°N 0.9411°W		1840–42		II
Holy Trinity Church	Sewstern, Leicestershire; 52.7844°N 0.6824°W		1842	Built as a chapel of ease, later a parish church.	II
St Mary Magdalene's Church	Torquay, Devon; 50.4690°N 3.5331°W		1843–49		II*
St John the Evangelist's Church	King's Lynn, Norfolk; 52.7530°N 0.4027°E		1844–46		II
St Stephen's Church	South Shields, Tyne and Wear; 55.0037°N 1.4359°W		1844–46		II
All Saints Church	Runcorn, Cheshire; 53.3435°N 2.7366°W		1844–48	New church on the site of medieval church.	II*
St Mary's Chapel	Arley Hall, Cheshire; 53.3246°N 2.4886°W	Arley Hall Chapel 1	1845	For Rowland Egerton-Warburton.	II*
St Paul's Church	Alnwick, Northumberland; 55.4111°N 1.7064°W		1845–46		II*
St Michael's Church	Cowesby, North Yorkshire; 54.3031°N 1.2876°W		1846	For George Lloyd of Cowesby Hall.	II
St John the Evangelist's Church	High Cross, Thundridge, Hertfordshire; 51.8500°N 0.0213°W		1846		II
St Andrew's Church	South Otterington, North Yorkshire; 54.2824°N 1.4311°W		1847		II
Holy Trinity Church	East Finchley, Barnet, Greater London; 51.5922°N 0.1740°W		c. 1849		II
St Stephen and St Thomas' Church	Shepherd's Bush, Hammersmith and Fulham, Greater London; 51.5058°N 0.2290°W		1849–50		II
All Saints Church	North Wootton, Norfolk; 52.7915°N 0.4307°E		1852	Replacing a medieval church.	II
St Patrick's Church	Patterdale, Cumbria; 54.5366°N 2.9398°W		1852–53	A new church replacing an older one, for William Marshall.	II
St Mary's Church	Betteshanger, Kent; 51.2249°N 1.3106°E		1853–54		II
St Paul's Church	Over Tabley, Cheshire; 53.3162°N 2.4169°W		1853–55	Damaged by fire soon after opening, and rebuilt according to Salvin's plans in 1856.	II
Holy Trinity Church	Little Bollington, Cheshire; 53.3754°N 2.4140°W		1854		—
All Saints Church	Scotby, Cumbria; 54.8885°N 2.8736°W		1854–55	A new church for George Head Head.	II
Holy Trinity Church	Tooting, Wandsworth, Greater London; 51.4378°N 0.1619°W		1854–55		II
St Mary the Virgin's Church	Headley, Surrey; 51.2801°N 0.2736°W		1855	Tower added in 1859 by G. E. Street.	II
St Katherine's Church	Rowsley, Derbyshire; 53.1912°N 1.6200°W		1855		II
St Mark's Church	Torquay, Devon; 50.4576°N 3.5151°W		1856–57	Since converted into the Little Theatre.	II*
St Matthew's Church	Torquay, Devon; 50.4677°N 3.5064°W		1858		II*
St Margaret's Church	Wolstanton, Newcastle-under-Lyme, Staffordshire; 53.0297°N 2.2155°W		1859–60	A new church incorporating fabric from an earlier church; the chancel is by Salvin.	II*
St Thomas a Becket's Church	Kirkhouse, Farlam, Cumbria; 54.9318°N 2.6748°W		1860		II
St John the Evangelist's Church	Percy Main, North Tyneside, Tyne and Wear; 54.9979°N 1.4730°W		1862	For the Duke of Northumberland.	II
St Nicholas' Church	Lazonby, Cumbria; 54.7508°N 2.7018°W		1863	Built and paid for by the Maclean family of Lazonby Hall.	II
St Paul's Church	Whitley Bay, Tyne and Wear; 55.0417°N 1.4479°W		1864	Paid for by the 4th Duke of Northumberland.	II
St Laurence's Church	Burwarton, Shropshire; 52.4607°N 2.5642°W		1874–76	Built to replace an earlier church whose ruins are nearby for the 8th Viscount Boyne. Declared redundant in 1972 and converted into a house.	II
St John's Church	Perlethorpe, Nottinghamshire; 53.2317°N 1.0345°W		1876		II*

== See also ==
- List of church restorations and alterations by Anthony Salvin
- List of work on castles and country houses by Anthony Salvin
- List of miscellaneous works by Anthony Salvin
