= Holy Trinity Church, Ulverston =

Coordinates: 54.1938°N 3.0978°W

Holy Trinity Church
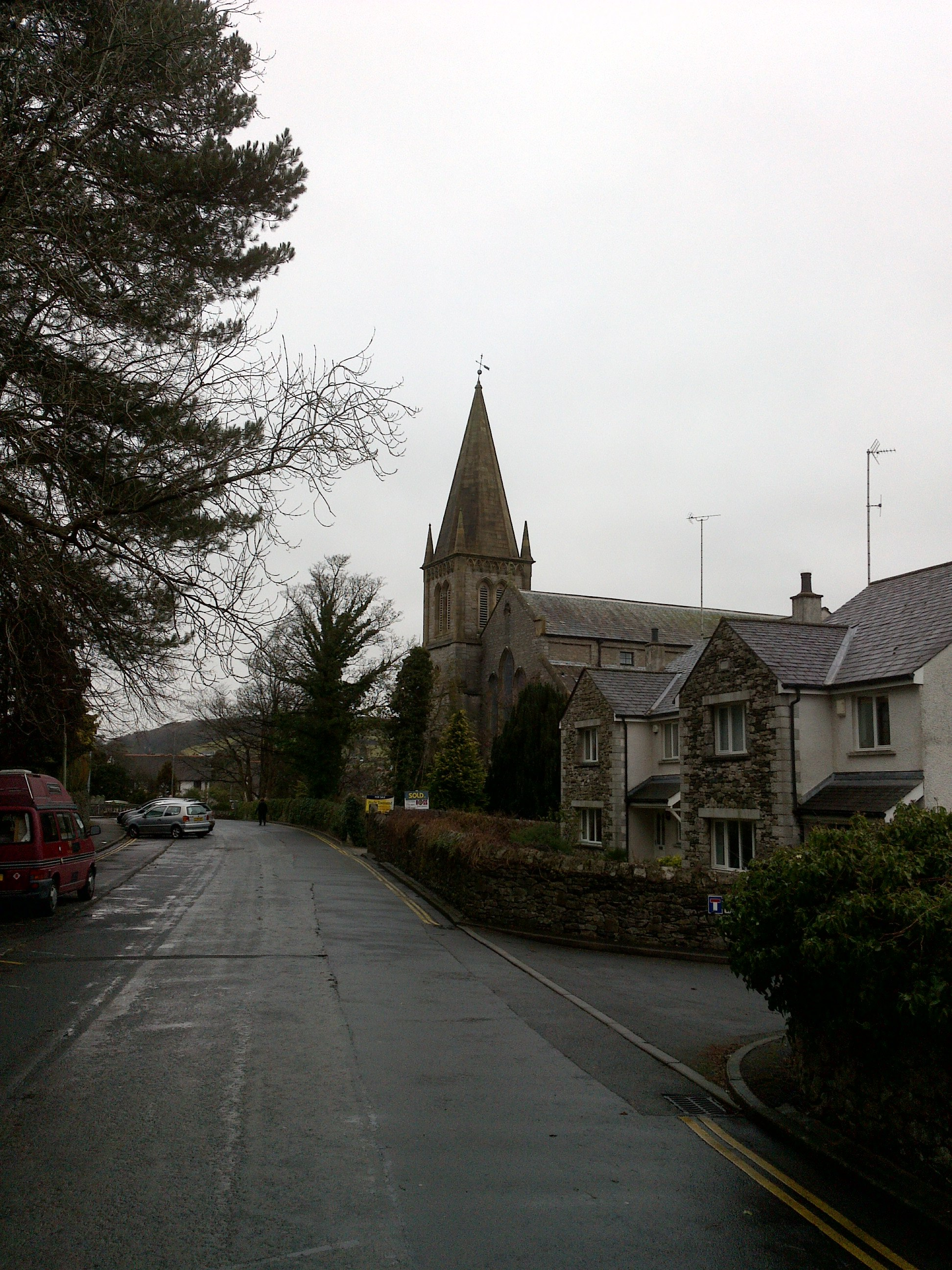

- Location in South Lakeland Location in Cumbria
- OS grid reference: SD 285 781
- Location: New Church Lane, Ulverston, Cumbria
- Country: England
- Denomination: Anglican

History
- Status: Parish church

Architecture
- Functional status: Redundant
- Heritage designation: Grade II
- Designated: 20 June 1972
- Architect(s): Anthony Salvin; Paley and Austin
- Architectural type: Church
- Style: Gothic Revival
- Groundbreaking: 1829
- Completed: 1832

Specifications
- Materials: Limestone with sandstone dressings Slate roofs

Holy Trinity Church is a redundant Anglican parish church in New Church Lane, Ulverston, Cumbria, England. It is recorded in the National Heritage List for England as a designated Grade II listed building. It is a Commissioners' church, having received a grant towards its construction from the Church Building Commission.

== History ==
Holy Trinity was built between 1829 and 1832, and was designed by Anthony Salvin. A grant of £3,423 (equivalent to £330,000 as of 2025) was given towards its construction by the Church Building Commission, the total cost of construction being £4,978. The interior of the church was re-ordered, and the chancel was added, by the Lancaster architects Paley and Austin in 1880. The church was declared redundant on 1 October 1976, converted for use as a sports hall the following year, and further converted, this time for residential use, in 1996.

== Architecture ==
=== Exterior ===
The church is constructed in limestone rubble with sandstone dressings, and has slate roofs. Its plan consists of a five-bay nave, north and south aisles, a chancel at a lower level, and a northwest tower with a spire. The tower has angle buttresses, pairs of lancet bell openings over which is a band of trefoils, and pinnacles at the corners. The aisle bays are separated by buttresses. The walls contain lancet windows, with doorways in the western bay on the south side, and in the fourth bay from the west on the north side. At the west end of the church is a doorway, above which is a triple stepped lancet window. There is another triple stepped lancet at the east end of the chancel, and windows with trefoil heads in its north and south walls.

=== Interior ===
Inside the church the five-bay arcades are carried on octagonal piers. In the chancel is a double sedilia and a piscina. The reredos is in marble and alabaster. In the north aisle are two windows containing stained glass, one by Morris, and the other, dating from about 1905, by Kempe. When the church was examined for listing in the mid-1990s, it was disused, its interior had been subdivided, and false ceilings had been inserted. The original three-manual organ had been built by Bellamy of Manchester. It was updated in 1853 by Jardine and company, also of Manchester, and rebuilt in 1958 by Rushworth and Dreaper.

== See also ==
- List of Commissioners' churches in Northeast and Northwest England
- Listed buildings in Ulverston
- List of new churches by Anthony Salvin
- List of ecclesiastical works by Paley and Austin
