= Trafford Mausoleum, Wroxham =

Trafford Mausoleum
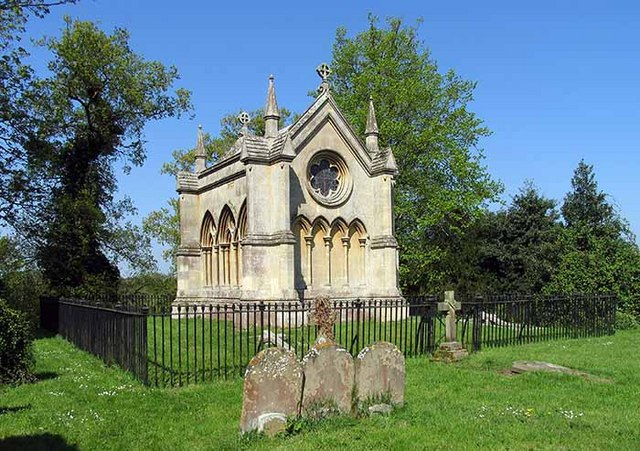

- Location within Norfolk
- 52.7069°N 1.3978°E
- Type: Mausoleum
- Location: Wroxham, Norfolk

History
- Built: C.1830

Site notes
- Architect: Anthony Salvin
- Architectural style: Gothic Revival (Early English style)

Listed Building – Grade II
- Official name: Trafford Mausoleum, St Mary's Churchyard
- Designated: 16 May 1984
- Reference no.: 1050869

The Trafford Mausoleum, is a memorial in Wroxham, Norfolk, England. Commissioned after the death of Sigismund Trafford Southwell in 1827, the mausoleum was designed by Anthony Salvin in Gothic Revival style. It is a Grade II listed structure.

== History and architecture ==
The building has been used to bury members of the Trafford family. The Traffords of Wroxham Hall (now demolished) held land in the area from the Middle Ages.

Sigismund Trafford Southwell, High Sheriff of Norfolk in 1818, died in 1827. His wife Margaret approached Anthony Salvin to design a mausoleum which was constructed c.1830. It was built in the churchyard of St Mary the Virgin, Wroxham. Salvin exhibited the design at the Royal Academy in 1830. The style is Early English Gothic, described in the Norfolk 1: Norwich and the North-East volume of Pevsner as a; "correct, rather cold later 13th century style". The mausoleum is a Grade II listed structure.
