= Penoyre House =

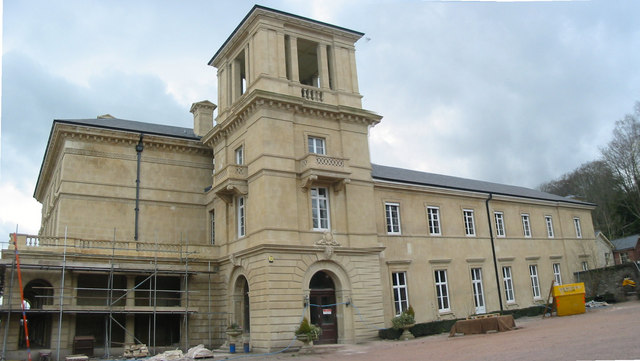
- Penoyre House - under renovation in 2006
- Interactive map of the Penoyre House area

General information
- Type: Country house
- Architectural style: Italianate
- Location: Battle, Powys, Wales
- Coordinates: 51.9689°N 3.4309°W
- Construction started: 1846
- Completed: 1848
- Client: John Lloyd Vaughan Watkins

Design and construction
- Architect: Anthony Salvin
- Designations: Grade II* listed

Penoyre House, Battle, Powys, Wales is a nineteenth century country house. Designed by Anthony Salvin for Colonel John Lloyd Vaughan Watkins, it was built between 1846-8. In an Italianate style, it is described by Mark Girouard as "Salvin's most ambitious classical house". The enormous cost of the house almost bankrupted the family and it was sold only 3 years after Colonel Watkins's death. From 1947, the house was in institutional use, and was converted to apartments in the early twenty-first century. The building is Grade II* listed The gardens are listed Grade II on the Cadw/ICOMOS Register of Parks and Gardens of Special Historic Interest in Wales.

== History ==
John Lloyd Vaughan Watkins (1802–65) was a nineteenth century Welsh Liberal politician who sat Member of Parliament for Brecon. and was High Sheriff of Brecknockshire and Lord Lieutenant of Brecknockshire. Watkins inherited a late eighteenth century house from his father, the Reverend Thomas Watkins, and engaged Salvin to undertake a complete rebuilding from 1846-8. The cost of the house alone was over £33,000 and Allibone records that Watkins was obliged to "close (it) and live cheaply in a local hotel." Only three years after his death in 1865, the house was sold. Privately owned from 1868 to 1947, the house was then used as a school, the clubhouse to a golf club, a nursing home, an hotel and a rehabilitation centre. In the early twenty-first century, the house was converted to apartments.

== Architecture ==
The house is designed in an Italianate style, echoing Sir Charles Barry's Trentham Park and Thomas Cubitt's Osbourne House. Girouard calls it "Salvin's most ambitious classical house". It has a three-storey main block, a "colossal" entrance tower with a belvedere top, and a balancing conservatory wing which had a glass-domed roof, although this was replaced in 1899.

== Gallery ==
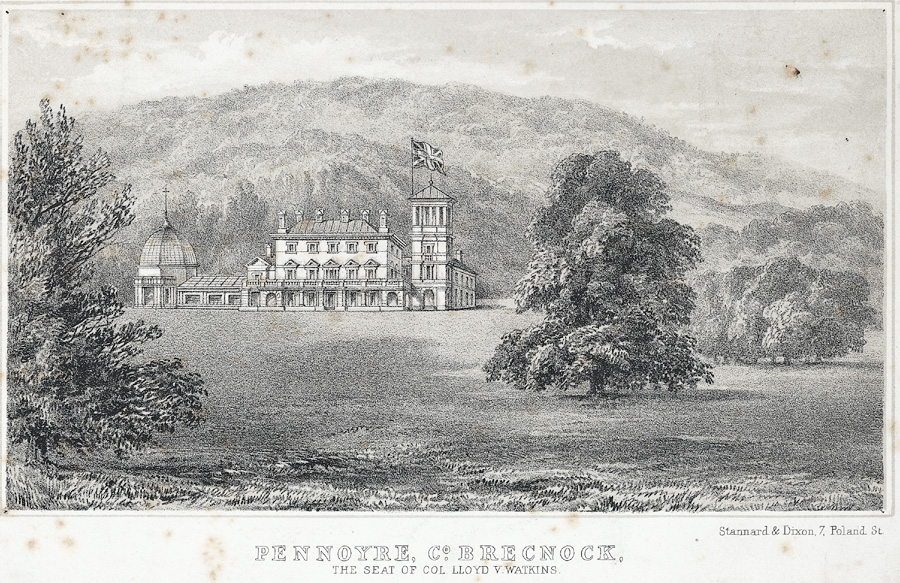

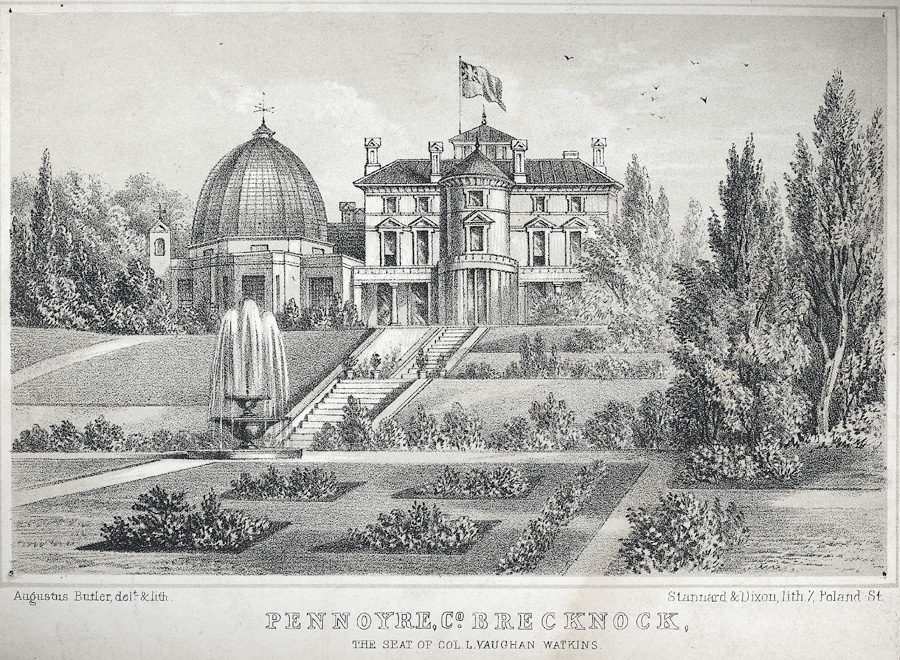
