= Church of the Holy Sepulchre, Cambridge =

Coordinates: 52.2084°N 0.1189°E

The Round Church, Cambridge
- Church of the Holy Sepulchre
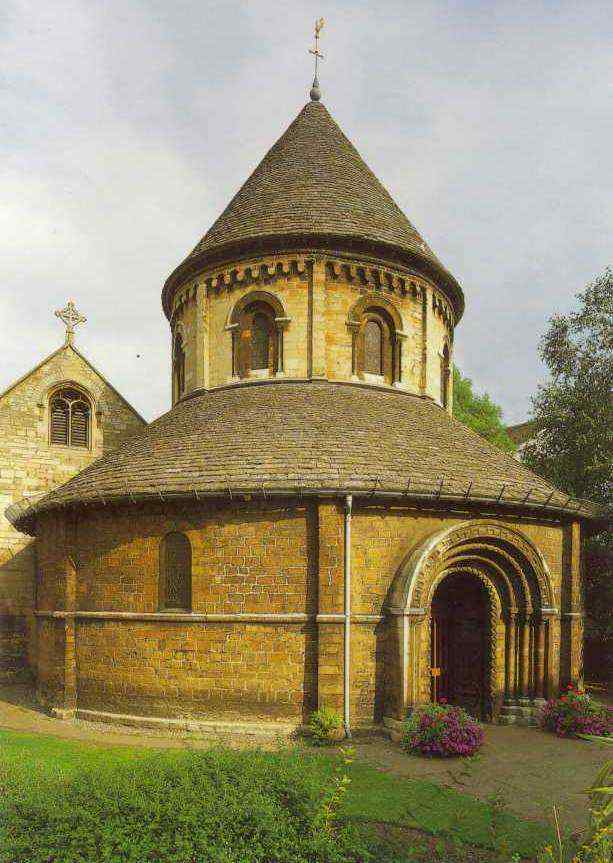
- West front of the Church of the Holy Sepulchre, Cambridge

- Location in Cambridgeshire
- OS grid reference: TL 448 588
- Location: Cambridge
- Country: England
- Denomination: Anglican
- Previous denomination: Catholic
- Website: Round Church

History
- Founded: c. 1130

Architecture
- Functional status: Parish Church
- Heritage designation: Grade I
- Designated: 26 April 1950
- Architect: Anthony Salvin (restoration)
- Architectural type: Church
- Style: Norman, Gothic Revival
- Completed: 1842

Specifications
- Materials: Stone

The Church of the Holy Sepulchre, generally known as The Round Church, is an Anglican church in the city of Cambridge, England. It is located on the corner of Round Church Street and Bridge Street. Since 1950 the church has been designated a Grade I listed building, and is currently managed by Christian Heritage. It is one of the four medieval round churches still in use in England.

== History ==
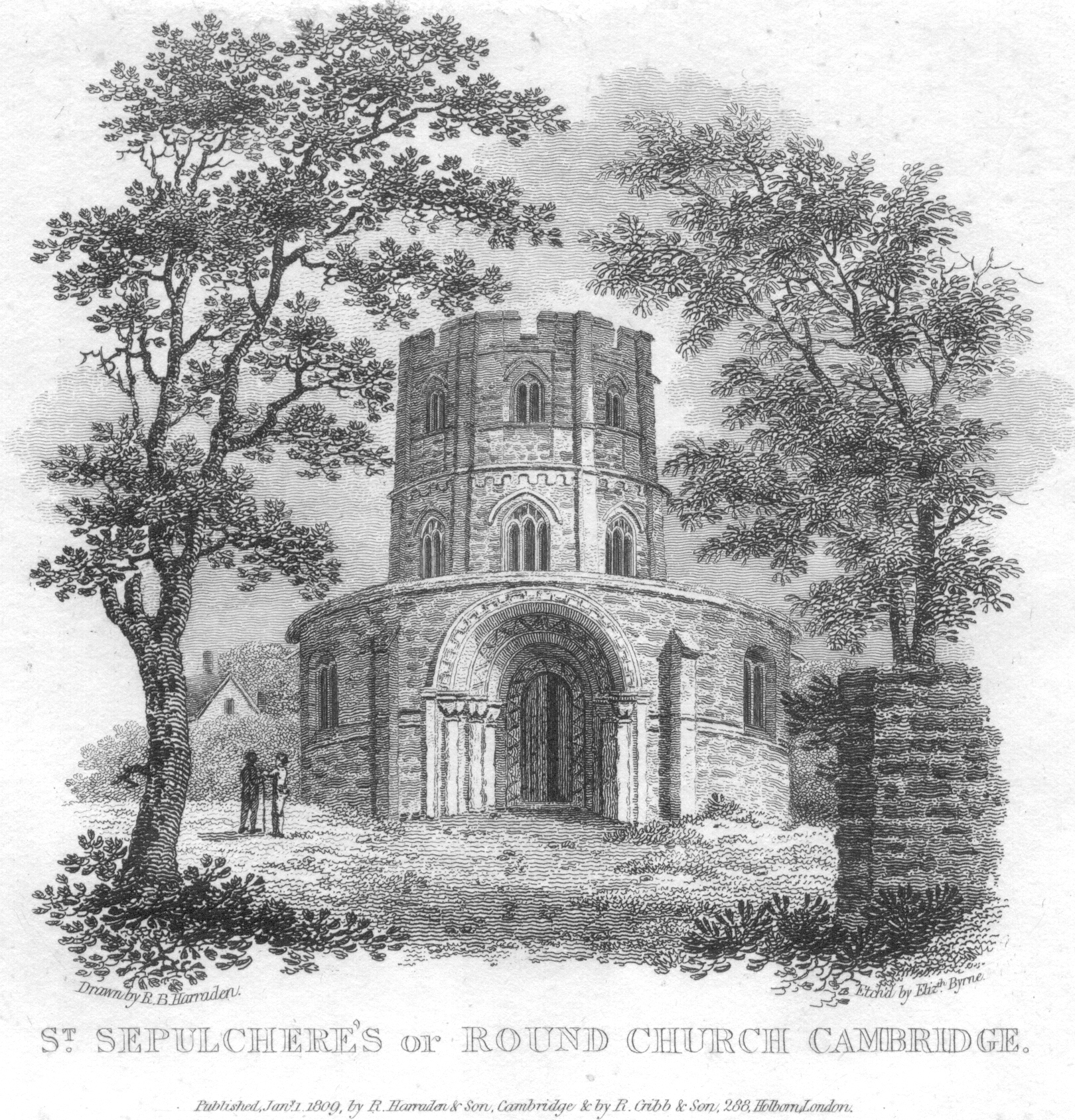
Holy Sepulchre in 1809 showing the Gothic bell-storey

The church was built around 1130, its shape being inspired by the rotunda in the church of the Holy Sepulchre, Jerusalem. It was built by the Fraternity of the Holy Sepulchre, who were probably a group of Austin canons. It consisted of a round nave and an ambulatory, with a short chancel, probably in the shape of an apse. Initially it was a wayfarers' chapel on the Roman road known as Via Devana (this is now Bridge Street). By the middle of the 13th century it had become a parish church under the patronage of Barnwell Priory. Around this time structural alterations were made to the church, with the rebuilding of the chancel and the addition of a north aisle, the aisle being shorter than the chancel. During the 15th century the Norman style windows in the nave were replaced by larger Gothic style windows. The carvings of angels in the roofs of the chancel and aisle were added. A polygonal bell-storey was built over the nave. In 1643, during the Civil War, many of the "idolatrous" images were destroyed. By the 19th century the church was in a poor state of repair. Part of the ambulatory collapsed in 1841, and the Cambridge Camden Society offered to carry out repairs. They appointed Anthony Salvin for the purpose.

"[2 January 1644 Holy Sepulchre, in Cambridge] We break down 14 superstitious Pictures, divers Idolatrous Inscriptions, one of God the Father, one of Christ and of the Apostles." The Journal of William Dowsing

Salvin replaced the bell-storey with a roof similar to the original roof. This was made necessary because the weight of the bell-storey was too much for the walls to support. The 15th-century Gothic windows were replaced by windows in Norman style, and a formerly-inserted gallery was removed, together with the external staircase leading to it. To compensate for this, a new south aisle was added. It was found that the east wall of the chancel was unstable and this was replaced. Then the north aisle, by that time in poor condition, was also rebuilt, extending it to the same length as the chancel. The floor, previously black marble, was relaid in tile. The original estimate for the cost of the restoration was £1,000, with the parish paying £300; it eventually cost nearly £4,000 (equivalent to £500,000 in 2024), with the parish providing only £50.

The erection in 1843 of a stone altar was the subject of a lawsuit. In 1845 the Court of Arches ordered that it be taken down and replaced with a wooden table.

In 1866 the Cambridge Union Society built their premises in the church's former graveyard, while, in 1899, a vestry was added to the north of the north aisle; this was extended in 1980. The Victorian stained glass in the east window was destroyed by a bomb in the Second World War and was replaced in 1946. By 1994 the congregation had become too large for the church, and they moved their gatherings to the nearby Church of St Andrew the Great.

== Architecture ==
The church is built in stone. Its plan consists of a circular nave surrounded by an ambulatory, a chancel with north and south aisles and a north vestry. Over the nave is an upper storey surmounted by a conical spire. To the north of the church is an octagonal bell-turret containing two bells. The church is entered by a Norman west doorway with three orders of colonnettes, decorated with scalloped capitals and zigzags, and crenellations in the voussoirs. Between the ambulatory and the nave are eight massive Norman columns and round arches. Each of the capitals of the columns is carved with a different design. Part of the vault of the ambulatory has dog-tooth ornamentation. In the ambulatory and nave are carved human heads dating from the 19th century. Above the nave is a triforium containing double Norman arches. To the east are the chancel and aisles. In the chancel and the north aisle are carved angels dating from the 15th century which are attached to the corbels supporting the roof; some of the angels are holding or playing musical instruments. The communion table dates from 1843 and was made by Joseph Wentworth. The chancel is floored between the choir stalls with tiles laid in 1842. They depict the Royal coat of arms, and the arms of Queen Victoria and Prince Albert. At the corners are animals representing the Four Evangelists. There are two bells in the bell-turret. One of these is dated 1663 and was cast by Robard Gurney; the other is a priest's bell possibly cast by J. Sturdy of London between 1440 and 1458. Most of the stained glass in the church was introduced during the 19th-century restoration and was designed and made by Thomas Willement and William Wailes. The glass in the east window was destroyed by a bomb in 1942 and was replaced by a new window in 1946 depicting Christ in Majesty.

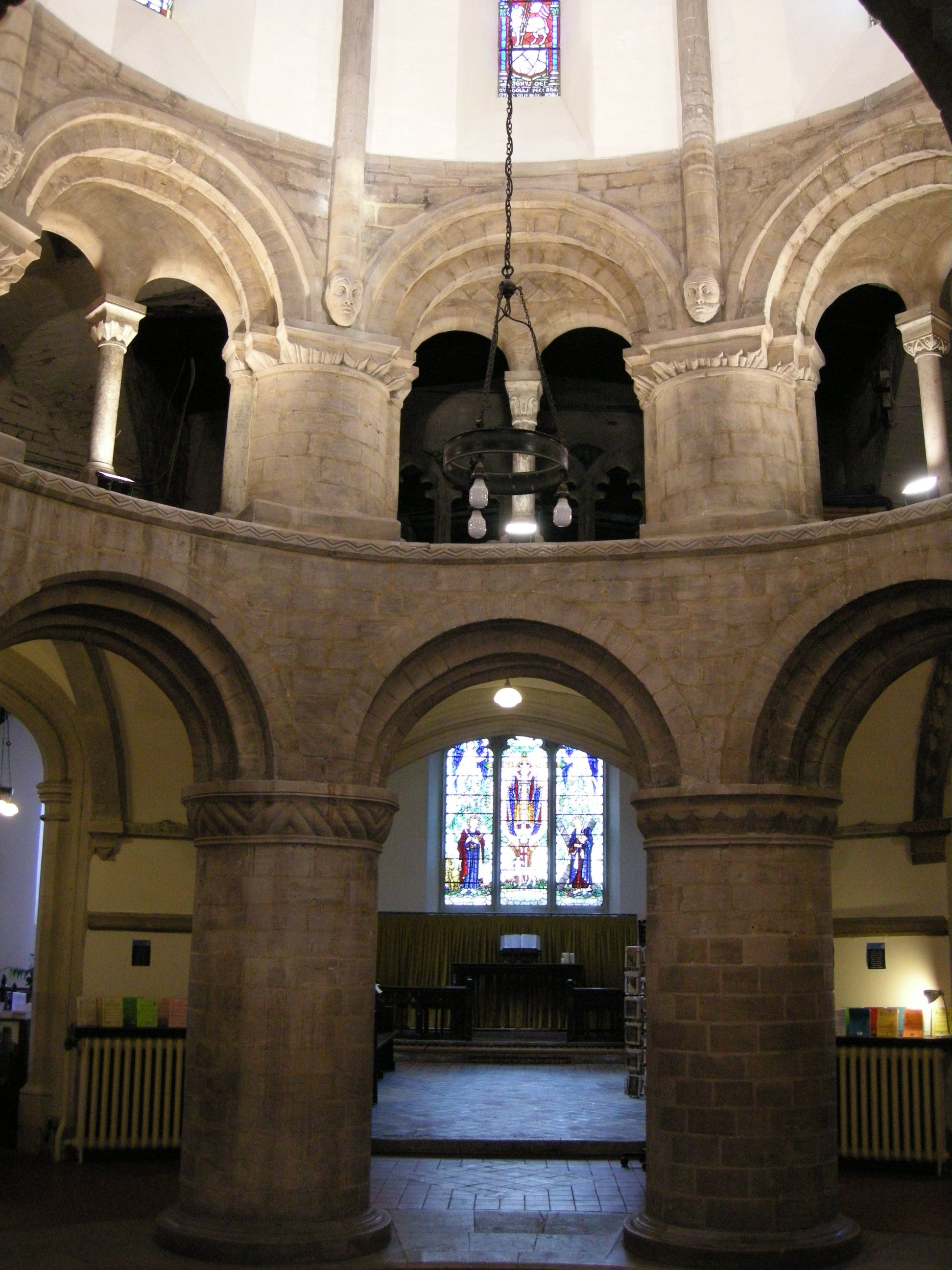
Interior looking towards the altar

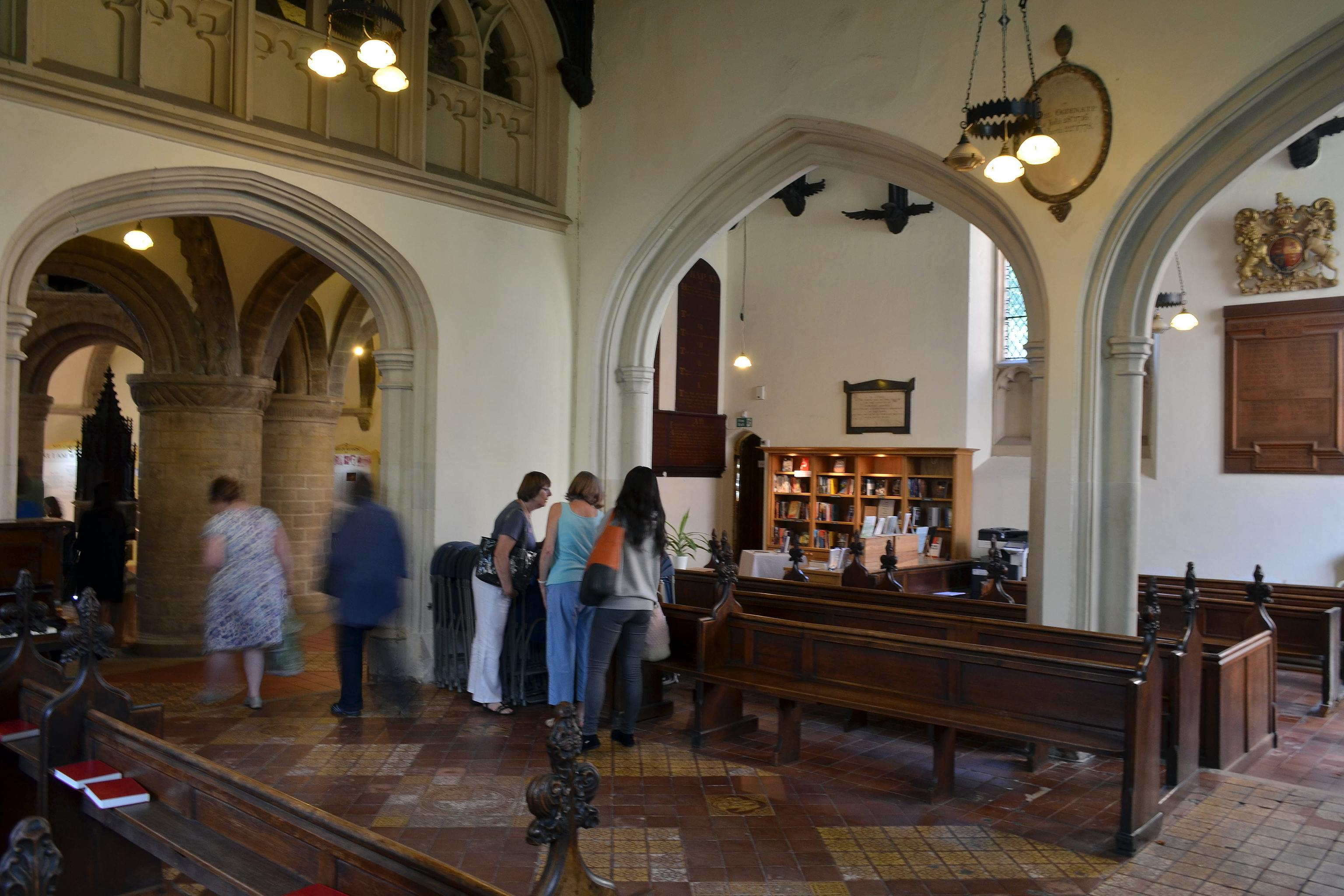
The nave (foreground) and north aisle (background right)

Stereo image
Right frame
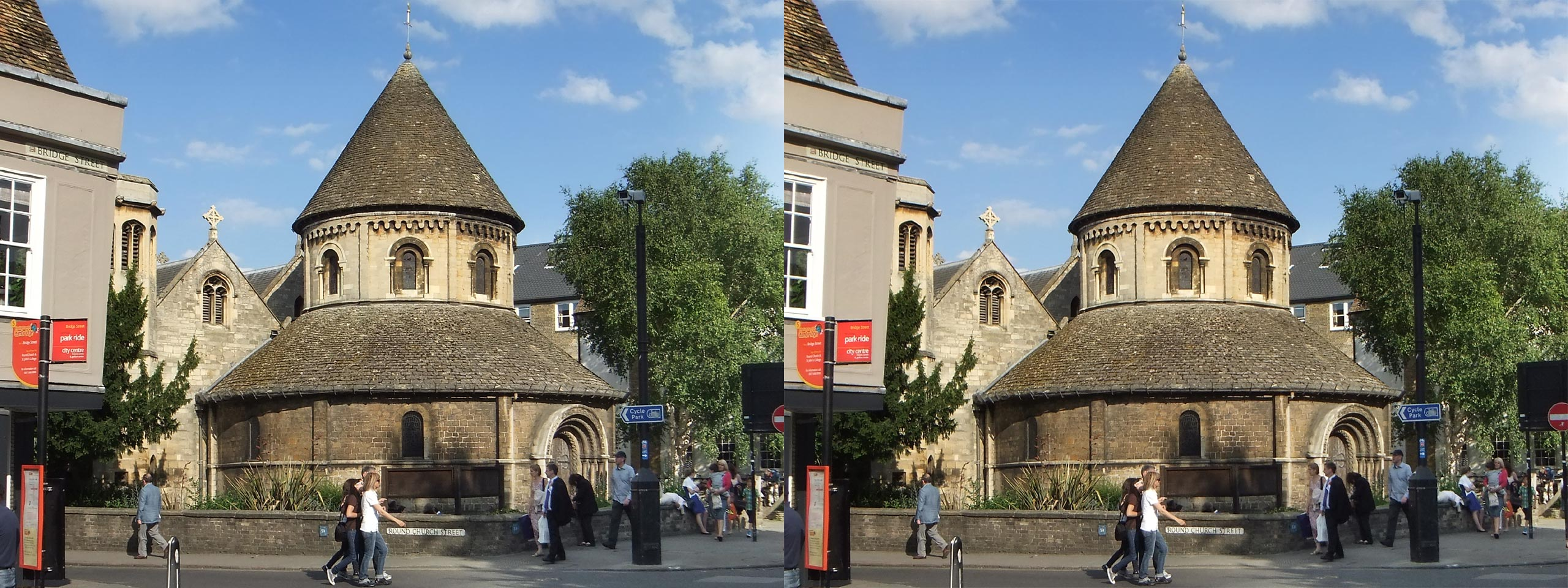
Left frame
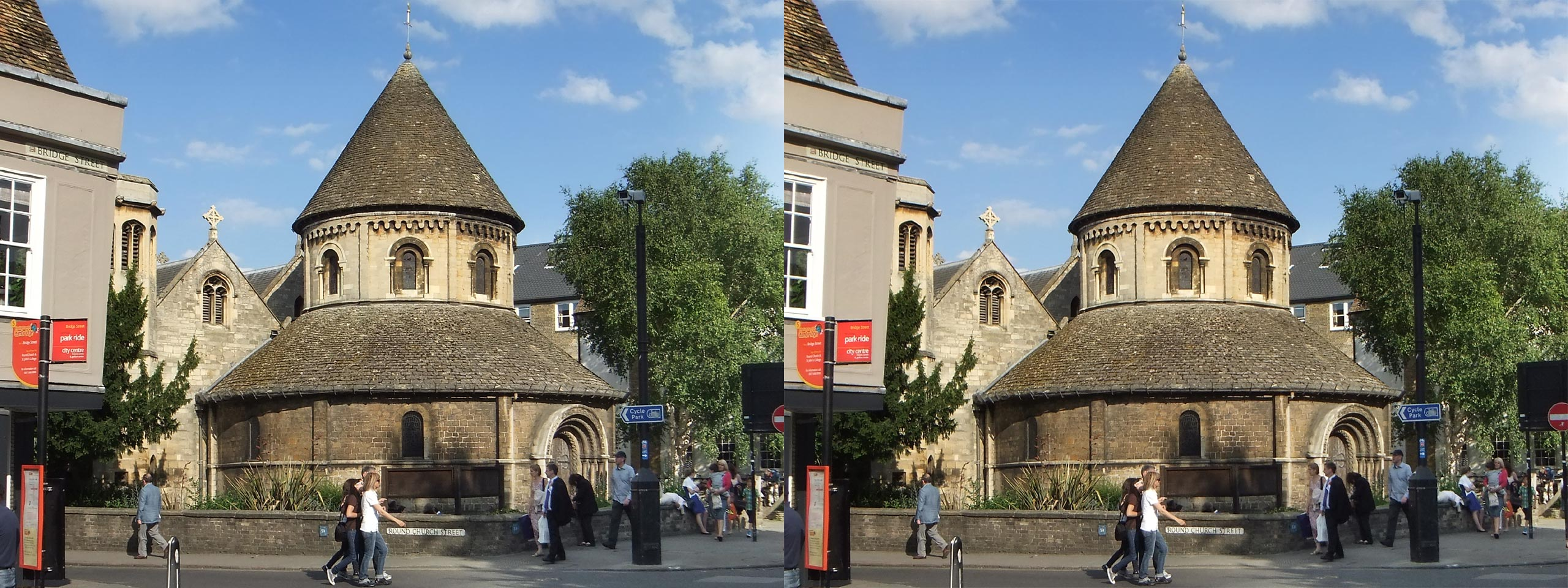
Cross-eye view
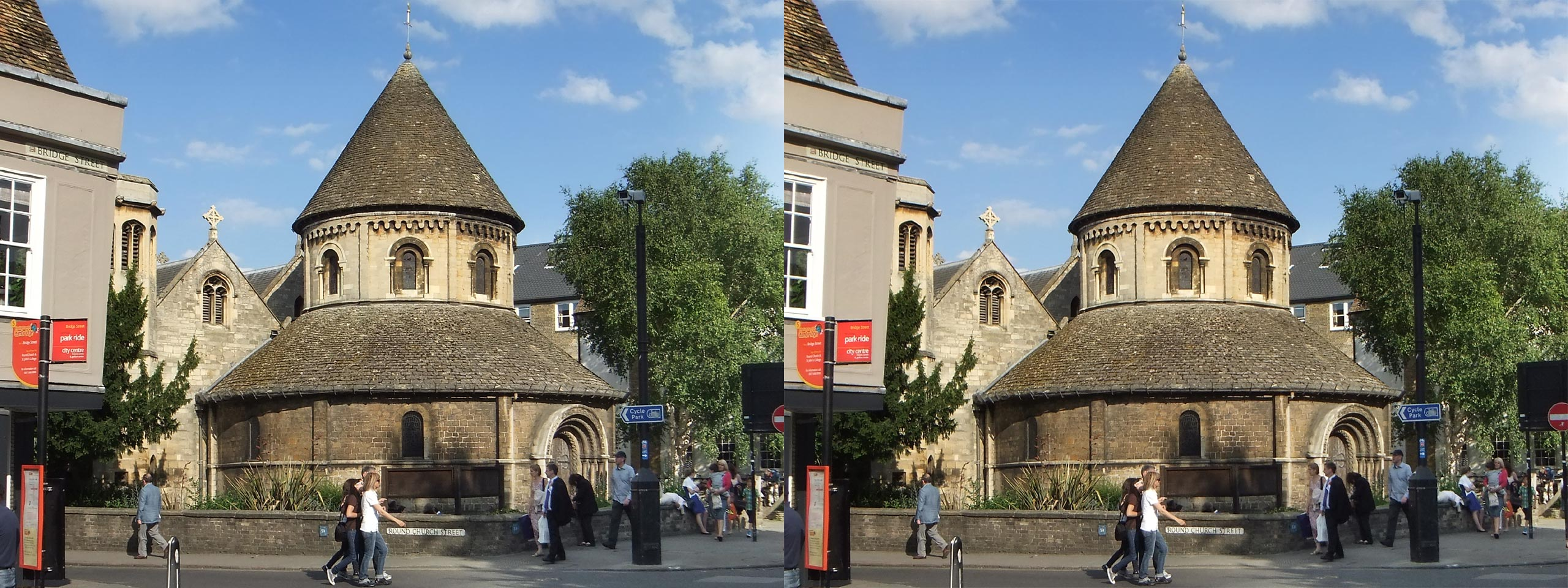
Parallel view
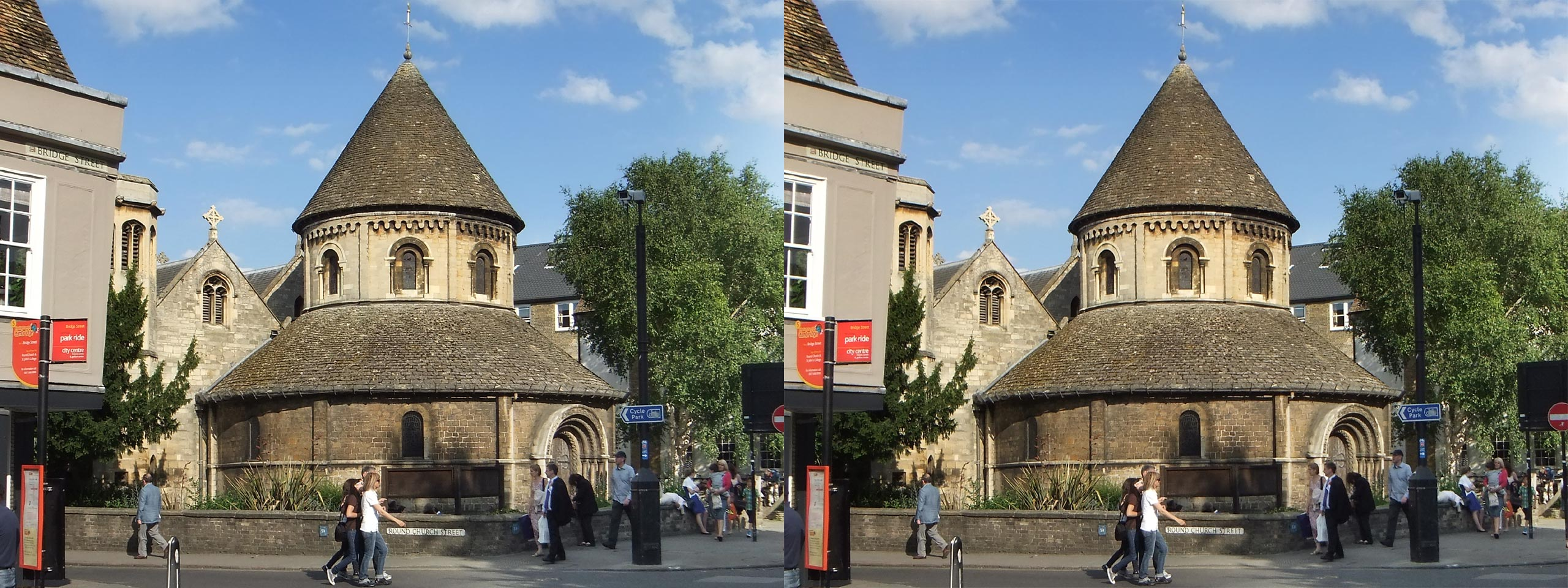

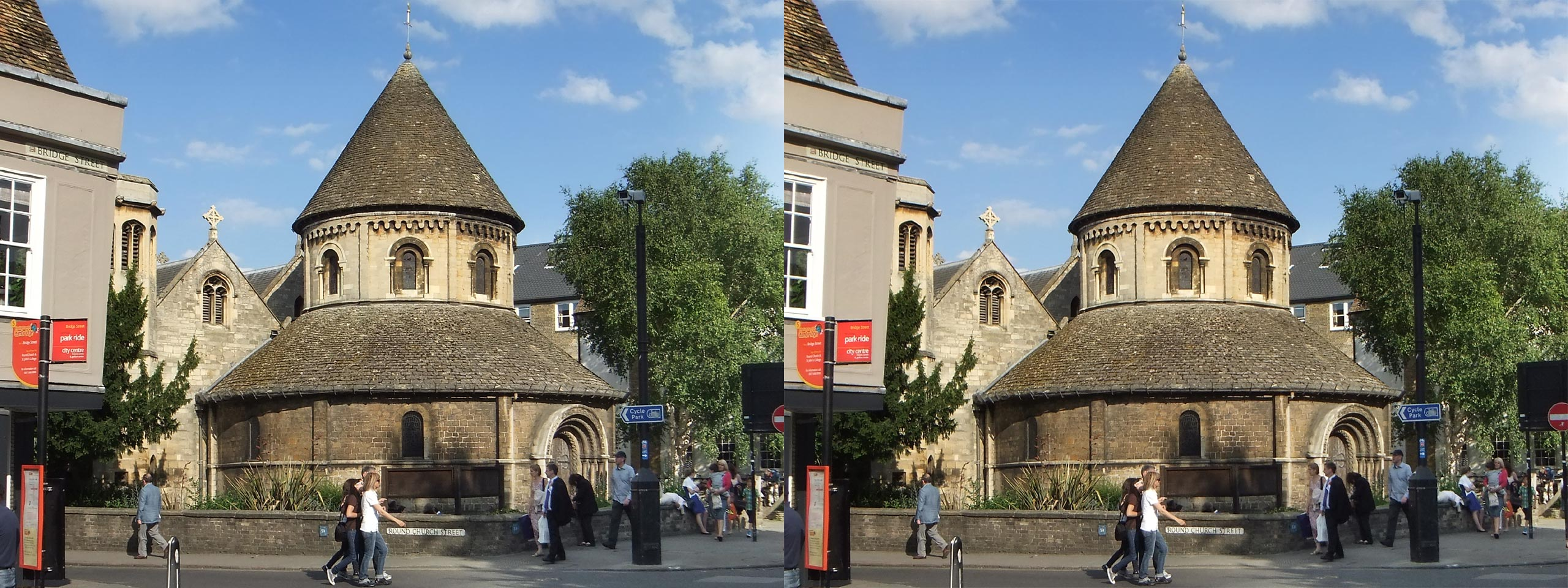
- The Round Church and the south end of Round Church Street.

== Recent history and present day ==
By 1994 the congregation had grown too large to be accommodated and it moved to the nearby Church of St Andrew the Great. Holy Sepulchre is open for visitors and contains an exhibition entitled The Impact of Christianity in England, and a study centre known as a scriptorium. The church hosts concerts, recitals and plays, and arranges courses, summer schools, and lectures.

== Burials ==
- John Lowry

== See also ==
- Cambridge Union, the oldest debating society in the world
- List of church restorations and alterations by Anthony Salvin
- St Bene't's Church, the oldest building in Cambridge, dating from 1033
- Leper Chapel, dating from 1125
- School of Pythagoras, dating from around 1200
- High medieval domes
