= Fernhurst =

Village and parish in West Sussex, England

Coordinates: 51.049°N 0.723°W

- Village
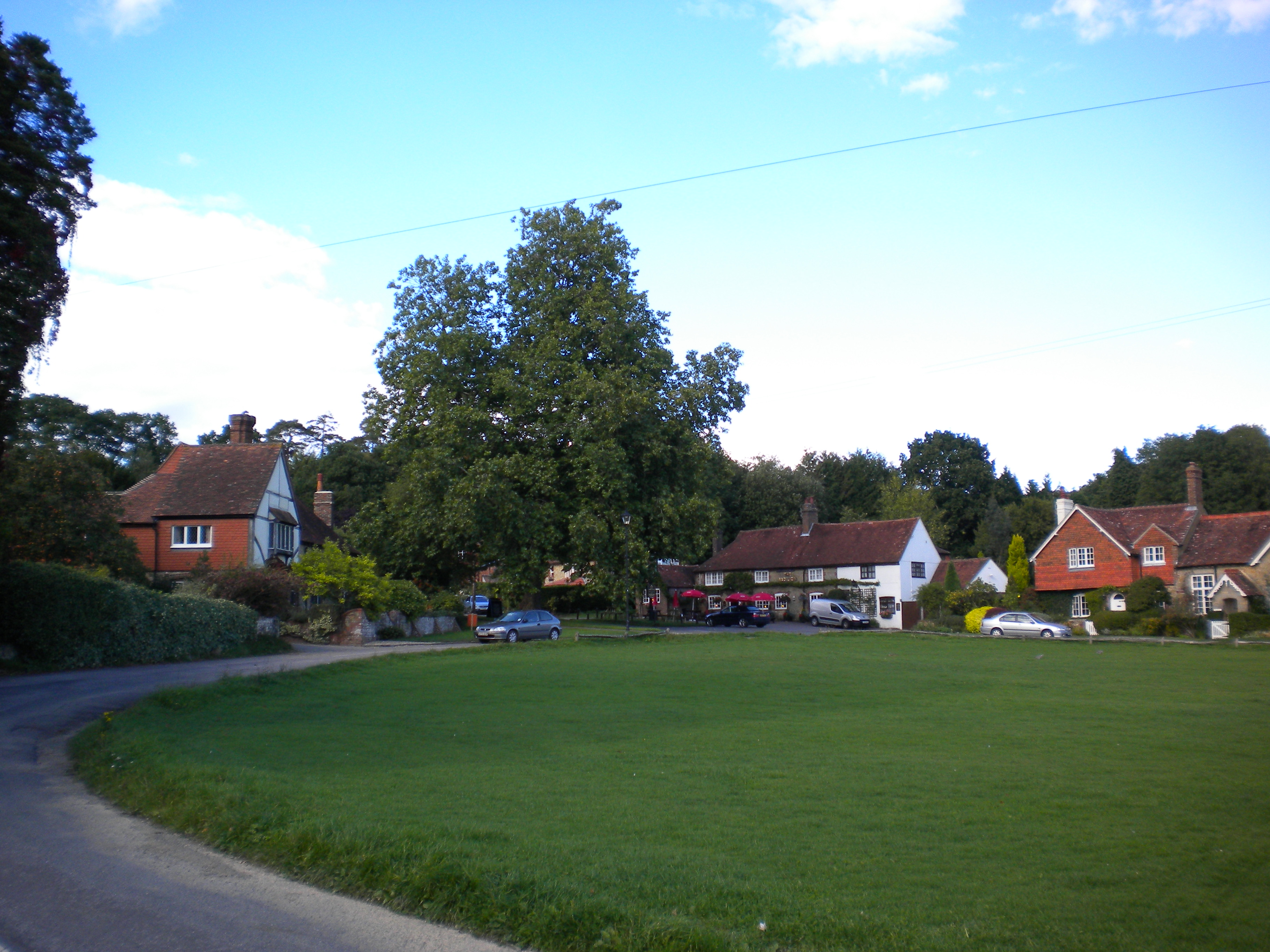
- The Green and Red Lion (centre)

- Location within West Sussex
- Area: 23.37 km^{2} (9.02 sq mi)
- Population: 2,959. 2021 Census
  - Density: 118/km^{2} (310/sq mi)
- OS grid reference: SU896284
  - London: 41 miles (66 km) NE
- Civil parish: Fernhurst
- District: Chichester
- Shire county: West Sussex
- Region: South East
- Country: England
- Sovereign state: United Kingdom
- Post town: HASLEMERE
- Postcode district: GU27
- Dialling code: 01428
- Police: Sussex
- Fire: West Sussex
- Ambulance: South East Coast
- UK Parliament: Arundel and South Downs

Fernhurst is a village and civil parish in the Chichester District of West Sussex, England, on the A286 Milford, Surrey, to Chichester road, 3 miles (4.8 km) south of Haslemere and 4 miles (6.4 km) north of Midhurst. The parish includes the settlements of Henley Common, Kingsley Green and Bell Vale, lies within the boundaries of the South Downs National Park and is surrounded by hills.

The area of the parish is 5,772 acres (2,336 ha). In the 2001 census there were 1,158 households with a total population of 2,765 of whom 1,244 were economically active. The population had increased to 2,942 at the 2011 Census.

== Geography ==
Fernhurst lies in the valley of the River Lod whose feeder streams, known as ghyls, rise in the surrounding hills, that include Telegraph Hill at 676 feet (206 m), Marley Heights at 700 feet (210 m), Bexley Hill at 600 feet (180 m), Fridays Hill at 675 feet (206 m) and the highest hill in Sussex, Blackdown at 919 feet (280 m), which rises to the northeast. The valley soil is predominantly clay with greensand outcrops on Blackdown summit. There are dense wooded areas punctuated by miles of footpaths, the path to the summit of Blackdown commencing at the Red Lion pub.

== History ==
The village, on the Weald, originally developed around crossroads (The Cross) and the village green, and ancient remains (Stone Age and Roman) have been found here. Iron working took place in the 17th/18th centuries and a turnpike ran through the village. The church, dedicated to St Margaret, (c. 1100) and Red Lion pub are on the green, where several old houses still remain. With the coming of the railway to Haslemere in the 19th century, and subsequent road improvements, the village expanded considerably.

In November 2006 the Fernhurst Society published a book, Voices of Fernhurst, comprising edited extracts of oral history interviews with local villagers.

== Governance ==
An electoral ward in the same name exists. This ward includes Linchmere and had at the 2011 census a total ward population of 5,334.

== St Margaret's Church ==
The Anglican parish church, dedicated to St Margaret of Antioch, was rebuilt in the 19th century, the south aisle in 1859 and the tower and spire as part of a general restoration by Anthony Salvin in 1881. The interior is plain.

== May Revels ==
Every May the traditional "Revels" fete is held on the green, raising funds for village societies and some local charities. The event includes various local May-time celebrations, such as maypole dancing, and the May queen is elected from the local area. In May 2006 a film of the village for the Meridian ITV programme Village Voices was filmed involving the revels and local craftsmen. It was screened on 15 August 2006.

== Verdley estate ==
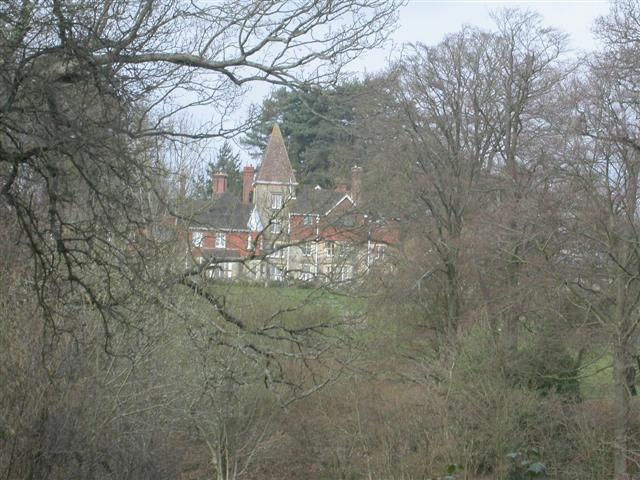
Verdley Place

About a mile south east of the village lies the Verdley estate. Verdley Castle, probably a 14th-century fortified manor house, or hunting tower, now demolished, lay in present-day Henley Wood. Its concealed wooded location in a hollow afforded protection for smugglers bringing goods from the south coast.

Closer to the village, Verdley Place was built by architect Anthony Salvin in 1873–5, as a country house for Charles Savile Roundell. Baron Davey was living here with his wife, three daughters and a son in the 1891 census. This Grade II listed building and the surrounding estate was the home of ICI's Plant Protection Division and its predecessors from 1945 at the Fernhurst Research Station and subsequently a Zeneca research and development centre. It has since been sold and converted to a residential development.

== Notable people ==
- Louise (Lulu) Cartwright, formerly of Ruby Flipper and Legs & Co. dance troupes, grew up in Fernhurst where her father was a GP.
- Margaret Hutchinson, teacher, naturalist and author lived in Kingsley Green and ran Yafflesmead Froebel School from 1931 to 1955.
- William Joyce, otherwise Lord Haw-Haw, spent his honeymoon in Fernhurst and patronised the Spread Eagle pub.
- Baron Onslow of Woking (1926–2001), former MP for Woking lived at Highbuilding in Vann Road, Fernhurst.
- According to the Fernhurst Society, "proof was found" that Joachim von Ribbentrop expressed his intention to live in Fernhurst "when Germany won the war".
- It is claimed that Bertrand Russell wrote Principia Mathematica in the house "Millhanger" about a mile south east of the village.
- Anthony Salvin, architect, built and lived at Hawksfold and is buried in the village.
- Margaret Shaw, a diarist remembered for A Countrywomans Journal: the sketchbook of a passionate naturalist lived and recorded her diary in Fernurst in 1926–27.
- Robert Pearsall Smith (1827–1898), evangelist and lay leader in the Higher Life movement in the United Kingdom in the late 19th century.
- Hannah Whitall Smith (1832–1911), evangelist and member of the Women's suffrage movement moved to Fernhurst in 1888, wife of Robert Pearsall Smith.

== Bibliography ==
Rickman, John (1998), The Land of Lod, Peggy Rickman, Midhurst, England
