= Mamhead House =

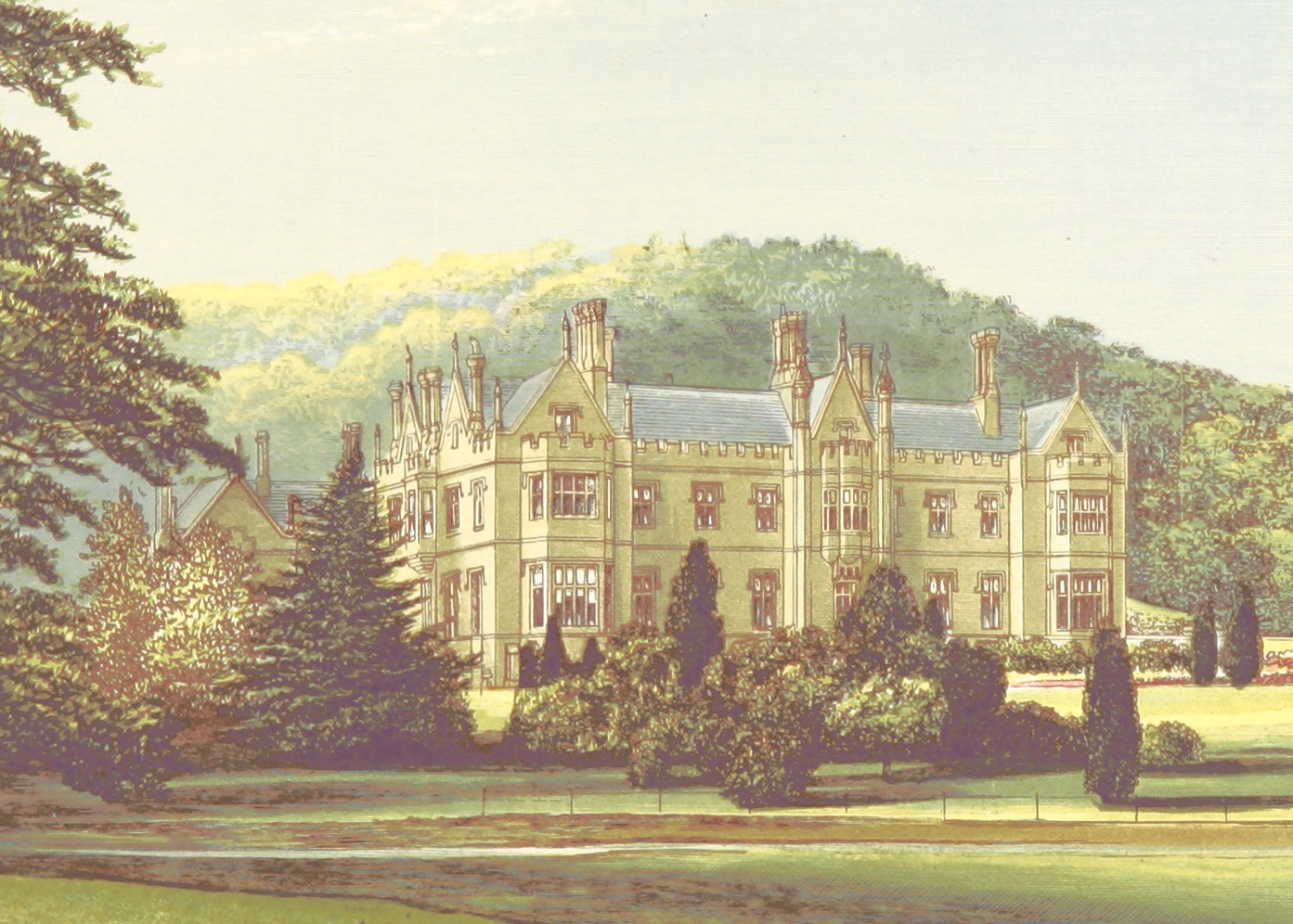
- Anthony Salvin's first major commission

- Location within Devon
- 50.6197°N 3.5133°W
- Type: House
- Location: Mamhead, Devon

History
- Built: 1827–1833

Site notes
- Architect: Anthony Salvin
- Architectural style: Tudor Revival
- Governing body: Privately owned

Listed Building – Grade I
- Official name: Dawlish College (Mamhead House)
- Designated: 11 November 1952
- Reference no.: 1170130

Listed Building – Grade II*
- Official name: Stable yard and service buildings North West of Dawlish College (Mamhead House)
- Designated: 11 November 1952
- Reference no.: 1333960

Listed Building – Grade II*
- Official name: Orangery
- Designated: 11 November 1952
- Reference no.: 1170208

Listed Building – Grade II
- Official name: Dawlish Lodge
- Designated: 11 November 1952
- Reference no.: 1097650

Listed Building – Grade II
- Official name: Forest Gate
- Designated: 11 November 1952
- Reference no.: 1097651

Mamhead House, Mamhead, Devon, is a country house dating from 1827. Its origins are older but the present building was constructed for Robert William Newman, an Exeter merchant, in 1827–1833 by Anthony Salvin. The house is Grade I listed as Dawlish College, its function at the time of listing. The parkland is listed at Grade II*.

== History ==
The Mamhead estate is recorded in the Domesday Book of 1086 as belonging to Ralph de Pomeroy. It was owned by the Carew and Ball families, of which latter Thomas Ball (1671–1749) was a merchant who planted many exotic trees. His head gardener Thomas Lucombe became a prominent nurseryman at Exeter. The estate came into the possession of Joseph Gascoigne Nightingale, whose sole heir, Elizabeth Nightingale, married Wilmot Vaughan, 1st Earl of Lisburne. Subsequently, the estate was owned by the Earls of Lisburne until it was bought by Robert Newman in 1823. In the 1770s, Capability Brown had undertaken landscaping of the grounds. Newman was the senior partner in Newman & Co., a trading company based in Exeter (Note: Pevsner records the firm as operating out of Dartmouth.) that had established a small shipping fleet to support its trade with Portugal and Newfoundland. (Note: Allibone records that Mamhead was financed with the profits made from the import of port and salt codfish.)

The original mansion house of the Balls had been demolished in the late 18th century and shortly after purchasing the estate, Newman commissioned Charles Fowler to design a new house. Fowler's Italianate plans did not find favour and Fowler had got no further than constructing the footings before he was replaced by Anthony Salvin. At 26, Salvin had his first important commission in Mamhead, and it made his reputation. His designs for the house were in the Tudor Revival style, then a relatively new architectural approach, and incorporated the initials of Newman and his new wife, together with the Newman family motto in the decorative skyline above the main entrance. (Note: The Historic England listing calls Mamhead House Dawlish College, a naming which reflected its status as a school in the late 20th century when the latest revision to the designation listing was undertaken.)

The Newman family retained ownership of the estate until the 1950s when Sir Ralph Newman, Robert Newman's great-grandson, sold it to an evangelical society. It subsequently housed a school, Dawlish College, in the 1960s, and was the regional headquarters of the Forestry Commission in the 1990s.

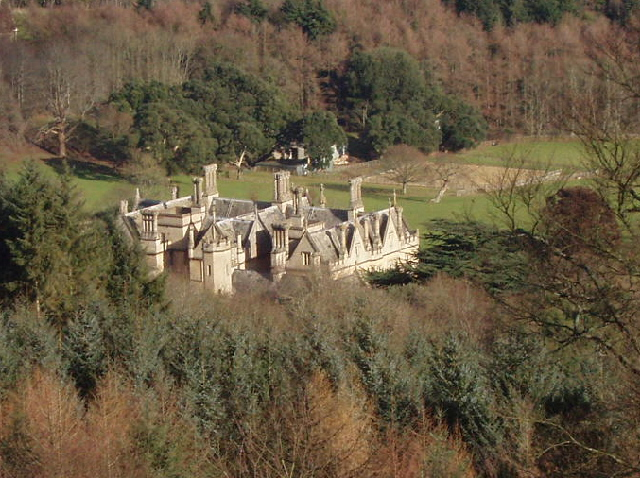
Distant view of Mamhead House, 2006

In the early 21st century the house, again privately owned, operated as an events and wedding venue, hosting the second marriage of Peter Andre in 2015. The business subsequently went into liquidation, and its owner was disqualified from acting as a company director in 2019. In 2020 the house, with an estate of approximately 164 acres, was put up for sale at a guide price of £10,000,000.

== Architecture and description ==
Pevsner describes Mamhead as establishing "Salvin as the chief architect of his time for large country houses in the Tudor style". The house is large, of nine bays, with battlemented and gabled roofs. It follows a "conservative" plan, mainly dictated by Fowler's foundations which has been undertaken for his intended, classically planned building. All the main rooms face east, opening on to a long, axial, gallery. This gallery housed a collection of statues depicting English monarchs and worthies of the Tudor era, an unusual feature for the decoration of an English country house. Pevsner suggests that they were influenced by the decorative schemes for the Houses of Parliament being planned at the same time, of which Sir Robert would have been aware, having been elected M.P. for Exeter in 1818. Salvin's biographer, Jill Allibone, suggests the Temple of British Worthies at Stowe as the statues' most obvious ancestor, and writes of their "scandalous removal" and sale in the 1980s. (Note: Pevsner notes the use of similar statues in the decoration of the staircase hall at Ashridge undertaken in the very early 19th century.)

As he did throughout his career, Salvin sought inspiration for his designs in earlier examples. The triple oriel window on the (east) garden front was copied from one on the entrance front of the genuinely Tudor Hengrave Hall in Suffolk. Simon Jenkins notes that the staircase in the gallery is recorded as being based on the external stair designed by James Wyatt for Canterbury Quadrangle at Christ Church, Oxford. The interior of the house contains stained glass by Thomas Willement and was decorated to an exceptionally high standard of craftsmanship. The conservatory, which adjoins the house, is surmounted by a parapet decorated with "an ingeniously apt quotation" from Geoffrey Chaucer's The Romaunt of the Rose: "Flouris yelowe white and rede / Such plenty grewe there ner in mede". Mamhead is listed at Grade I.

The mock castle to the north of the house, containing the stable block, the brewery and the laundry, is listed at Grade II*. Pevsner suggests that the castle is modelled on Belsay Castle in Northumberland, a building Salvin knew, having grown up in the North East. (Note: The Dictionary of National Biography records Salvin as having been born at Sunderland Bridge, County Durham in 1799. However, his biographer, Jill Allibone, has his place of birth as Worthing in Sussex, although much of his childhood was certainly spent in Durham and Northumberland.) The 1960s edition of Pevsner also suggested that it was constructed on the site of a genuine medieval castle, but this is contested and the 2004 revised Devon does not repeat the claim. The park has its own Grade II* listing.

== Lodges and ancillary structures ==
The park is entered via one of three lodges. The first two are certainly by Salvin, and the third is attributed to him. (Note: Allibone notes the Cottage orné style of the first two lodges, suggesting that Salvin may have had contact with John Nash, whose Blaise Hamlet had popularised the style. Allibone records that this picturesque design was not one to which Salvin returned in his subsequent career.) Each has its own Grade II listing; Dawlish Lodge, Forest Gate, and Basket Lodge. Pevsner describes Dawlish and Forest Gate lodges as "very pretty examples, Salvin trimmings added to plain 18th century boxes". Historic England considers Dawlish Lodge "the most inventive and least altered of the Mamhead House lodges".

Other features within the estate which are listed include: a sundial in the formal garden to the south of the house; a pool with a fountain in the same garden; the orangery; the terrace walling which runs to the south and east of the house; the steps, with decorative urns, leading from that terrace; and the obelisk, erected by Thomas Balle in 1742 as a guide for shipping, which stands in woodland on a ridge above the house. The writer Christopher Hussey suggests that the orangery was modelled on the water house at Chatsworth and may originally have had a similar cascade.

== Sources ==
- Allibone, Jill (1988). Anthony Salvin: Pioneer of Gothic Revival Architecture. Cambridge: Lutterworth Press. ISBN 0-7188-2707-4.
- Cherry, Bridget; Pevsner, Nikolaus (2004). Devon. The Buildings of England. New Haven, CT & London: Yale University Press. ISBN 9780300095968. OCLC 972033000.
- Jenkins, Simon (2003). England's Thousand Best Houses. London: Penguin Books. ISBN 978-0-7139-9596-1. OCLC 813876627.
