= Mamhead =

Village in Devon, England

Coordinates: 50.6197°N 3.5120°W

- Location within Devon
- OS grid reference: SX930811
- Shire county: Devon
- Region: South West
- Country: England
- Sovereign state: United Kingdom
- Post town: Exeter
- Postcode district: EX6
- Police: Devon and Cornwall
- Fire: Devon and Somerset
- Ambulance: South Western
- UK Parliament: Newton Abbot

Mamhead is a rural village and civil parish near Dawlish and Kenton in Devon, South West England, in the Teignbridge local authority area. Current community venues include Mamhead Village Hall and the Church of England parish church, dedicated to St Thomas the Apostle,

On high ground on the Haldon Hills, dense woodlands open out into views of the coast and the estuary of the River Exe.

== History ==
The village was part of Exminster hundred.

According to Daniel and Samuel Lysons, in their Magna Britannia:

It seems most probable that Mamhead House was the royal garrison spoken of by Whitelock as having been abandoned, on the approach of Sir Thomas Fairfax with his army, in the month of January, 1646. It appears to be called Sir Peter Byme's house, by mistake for Sir Peter Balle's for it is spoken of as near Powderham.

John Marius Wilson's Imperial Gazetteer of England and Wales (1870–1872) says of Mamhead:

MAMHEAD, a parish in St. Thomas district, Devon: under Great Haldon hill, 3½ miles W by S of Starcross r. station, and 4 E by N of Chudleigh. Post town, Exeter. Acres, 1,165. Real property, £1,747. Pop., 218. Houses, 40. The property is divided among a few. Mamhead House belonged once to the Balles; was the seat of Sir Robert Newman, who fell at the battle of Inkerman; is now the seat of his brother, Sir Lydston Newman, Bart.; is an edifice in the Tudor style; and stands on a charming spot, commanding a fine seaview. An obelisk of Portland stone, 100 feet high, erected about 1742, by T. Balle, Esq., crowns the summit of a wooded height on the Mamhead grounds. Many spots in the parish are richly picturesque. The living is a rectory in the diocese of Exeter. Value, £200. Patron, Sir L. Newman, Bart. The church is good, and has a tower. Charities, £8.

The population was 230 in 1801, 178 in 1901. A parish history file is kept at Dawlish Library.

== Mamhead estate ==
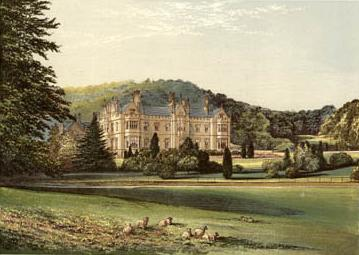
Mamhead Park, c. 1830

The Mamhead estate is known from as early as the Domesday Book, when it was held by Ralph de Pomeroy and later by Sir Hugh Peverell. In the early 14th century, Sir Nicholas Carew became lord of the manor through his marriage to Amicia de Peverell, and Mamhead remained with the Carews until 1547.

The Mamhead estate was sold by the adventurer Sir Peter Carew (1514–1575) to Giles Ball, whose son Sir Peter Ball (1598–1680) was attorney-general to King Charles I's Queen, Henrietta Maria. He began to build a country house here, replacing an older house. His grandson Thomas Ball (1671–1749), a merchant, planted many exotic trees brought back from his continental travels.

Britton & Brayley said of Mamhead's grounds The Beauties of England and Wales (1803):

"The woods and plantations of Mamhead are numerous and extensive. Many of them were introduced by Mr Thomas Balle (sic), the last of that family who, on returning from the continent brought with him a quantity of cork, ilex, wainscot, oak, Spanish chestnut, acacia, and other species of exotic trees. With these, he embellished the boldly swelling grounds at Mamhead."

Between 1742 and 1745, Ball built an obelisk on the hill above the house "out of a regard to the safety of such as might use to sail out of the Port of Exon or any others who might be driven on the coast". The obelisk has a height of one hundred feet. Mamhead then passed into the hands of the Earls of Lisburne, and 'Capability' Brown engaged through 1772–3 to redesign the grounds.

In 1823, Mamhead was bought by Robert William Newman (1776–1848), who completely rebuilt the house on a new site in 1827–1833, to the designs of Anthony Salvin. In 1833, Westley Farm was also rebuilt by Salvin. Newman was Member of Parliament for Exeter from 1818 to 1826 and High Sheriff of Devon in 1827. On 17 March 1836, he became Sir Robert William Newman, 1st Baronet, of Mamhead in the County of Devon. The third Baronet was High Sheriff of Devon in 1871.

In 1850, a report described the house as "a large and handsome mansion in the Elizabethan style".

The fourth Baronet represented Exeter in the House of Commons from 1918 to 1931, when he was created Baron Mamhead of Exeter in the County of Devon, in the Peerage of the United Kingdom. The peerage became extinct on his death in 1945, but the baronetcy is still extant.

Sir Robert Newman owned the property until his death in 1945; it was left in his will to Frederick Lumley and then to Ralph Newman.

=== After 1950 ===
During 1954 to 1958, the property was leased out and used as an evangelical holiday-and-conference centre by the Pathfinder Organization. It was sold in 1960 and again in 1963 when the Dawlish College for Boys purchased the mansion and most of the property. It was then acquired by a property company, Rockeagle, in 1988. In 1987, Mamhead Park and Garden were Grade II listed (Entry Number 1000555). By that time, the mansion was already Grade I Listed, as Dawlish College, Mamhead House (Entry Number 1170130).

The interior of the house was restored; the stables were converted in 1988 for the Forestry Commission which used it for offices. Later, the mansion served as an events venue but was sold to investors, led by Richard Fuller, in 2000. The property was listed for sale in 2019. (A previous sale listing in 2013 had included many photographs of the interior.)

The offer of sale included the Grade II listed Mamhead Castle (originally used as a stable and a brewery) which had been converted into six office suites. A Country Life article made this comment in June 2019:

It will take a buyer with cash, courage and extraordinary vision to take on this remarkable house and realise its full potential. With its grand reception rooms, wonderful fan-vaulted staircase, vast galleried halls, landings and corridors, extensive domestic offices, 16 main bedrooms, eight bathrooms, 11 attic rooms and romantic camellia house, Mamhead House represents a considerable challenge for any investor, but also an opportunity to preserve and enhance a unique estate that has remained, quite magnificently, untouched by time.

As of June 2019, the house was still available for occasional rental according to another publication which added that the offices in the castle were not being occupied. The actual listing for sale indicates that in addition to the primary living quarters, there are also 11 bedrooms and 2 bathrooms in the attic (formerly used by servants).

== Parish church ==
The Church of England parish church, dedicated to St Thomas the Apostle, stands in Mamhead Park and is a mostly 15th-century building. The chancel was rebuilt about 1830 by Robert William Newman, and the south transept was turned into the Mamhead pew.

=== Rectors ===
The Rector of the village from 1766 to 1777 was William Johnson Temple, who is mentioned several times in Boswell's Life of Johnson and letters from and to Temple are scattered through volumes of Boswell's Journals. He was the grandfather of Frederick Temple (1821–1902), Bishop of Exeter and Archbishop of Canterbury. Temple and Boswell had been undergraduates together at the University of Edinburgh, and Boswell visited Mamhead just after Easter, 1775. Temple was a water-drinker, and under his influence Boswell made a vow (not kept) under the branches of the great churchyard yew at Mamhead (which can still be seen) never to get drunk again.

William Plenderleath (1831–1906) was Rector of Mamhead from 1891 until 1905, and kept notes of the parish, described as "census details (official and unofficial), offertory accounts, list of communions, collections in aid of voluntary church rate, and confirmations. In the front is a linen-backed map showing inhabited houses in Mamhead".
