= Battle, Powys =

Coordinates: 51.968218°N 3.441241°W

Y Batel
- Location within Powys
- OS grid reference: SO 0108 3095
  - Cardiff: 36 mi (58 km)
  - London: 145 mi (233 km)
- Community: Yscir
- Principal area: Powys
- Country: Wales
- Sovereign state: United Kingdom
- Post town: BRECON
- Postcode district: LD3
- Police: Dyfed-Powys
- Fire: Mid and West Wales
- Ambulance: Welsh
- UK Parliament: Brecon, Radnor and Cwm Tawe
- Senedd Cymru – Welsh Parliament: Brecon and Radnorshire

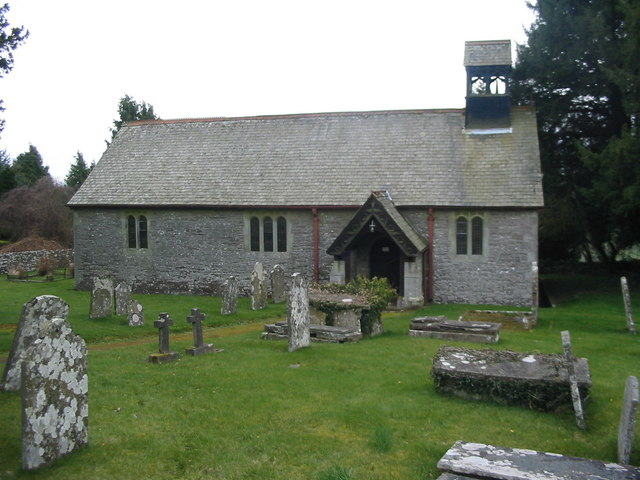
St Cynog's Church in Battle

Battle (Welsh: Y Batel) is a village in the community of Yscir, Powys, Wales, which is 36 miles (58 km) north of Cardiff and 146 miles (235 km) west of London. The Battle standing stone is an impressive Bronze Age monument and is 3.96 m in height.

== See also ==
- List of localities in Wales by population
