= Anthony Salvin =

English architect (1799–1881)

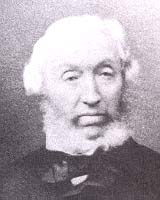
- Anthony Salvin
- Born: 17 October 1799; Sunderland Bridge, County Durham, England
- Died: 17 December 1881 (aged 82); Fernhurst, Sussex, England
- Occupation: Architect
- Known for: Tudor Revival architecture Restoration of castles, country houses and churches New houses and churches
- Children: Osbert Salvin

Anthony Salvin (17 October 1799 – 17 December 1881) was an English architect. He gained a reputation as an expert on medieval buildings and applied this expertise to his new buildings and his restorations, such as those of the Tower of London and Windsor Castle. He restored castles and country houses, and built a number of new houses and churches.

== Early life and training ==
Anthony Salvin was born in Sunderland Bridge, County Durham, as the only child of Anthony Salvin, a soldier, and his second wife Elizabeth (Eliza) Mills. He was educated at Durham School and in 1820 became a pupil of John Paterson of Edinburgh while he was working on the restoration of Brancepeth Castle in County Durham.

In 1821 Salvin moved to Finchley in north London. He had an introduction to Sir John Soane but did not enter his office. According to his nephew, he entered the office of John Nash. In 1824 he was elected as a fellow of the Society of Antiquaries. Soon after this he went on a sketching tour of Great Britain. On 26 July 1826 he married his cousin, Anne Andrews Nesfield. With her he had six children, two of whom died in infancy.

== Early career ==
Salvin's first major commission was Mamhead House in Devon for Robert William Newman. This was designed in the Tudor style to a symmetrical plan. It was adapted from a plan by Charles Fowler and this placed restrictions on his design. His next design was for Moreby Hall in the East Riding of Yorkshire for Henry Preston where he was free to develop a complete design in the Tudor style, again on a symmetrical plan.

At Scotney Castle in Kent he designed for Edward Hussey an asymmetrical design in the Tudor style. In 1831 Salvin embarked on what is considered to be his most important early domestic work at Harlaxton Manor in Lincolnshire for Gregory Gregory. Salvin's design combined elements from Montacute House in Somerset and Hengrave Hall in Suffolk. However, before the building was complete, Salvin was replaced as architect by William Burn. In 1835 Salvin spent five weeks in Germany.

In 1836 Salvin entered a design in Tudor style in the competition for the new Palace of Westminster which had possibly been inspired by his visit to Germany. However this was unsuccessful, as was his entry for the competition to design the Ashmolean Museum in Oxford. He won the competition for the design of the Carlton Club in Pall Mall, London, but the club decided not to proceed with his plan. After losing a further competition, this time to design the Army and Navy Club, Salvin did not enter any more competitions.

== Mature career ==
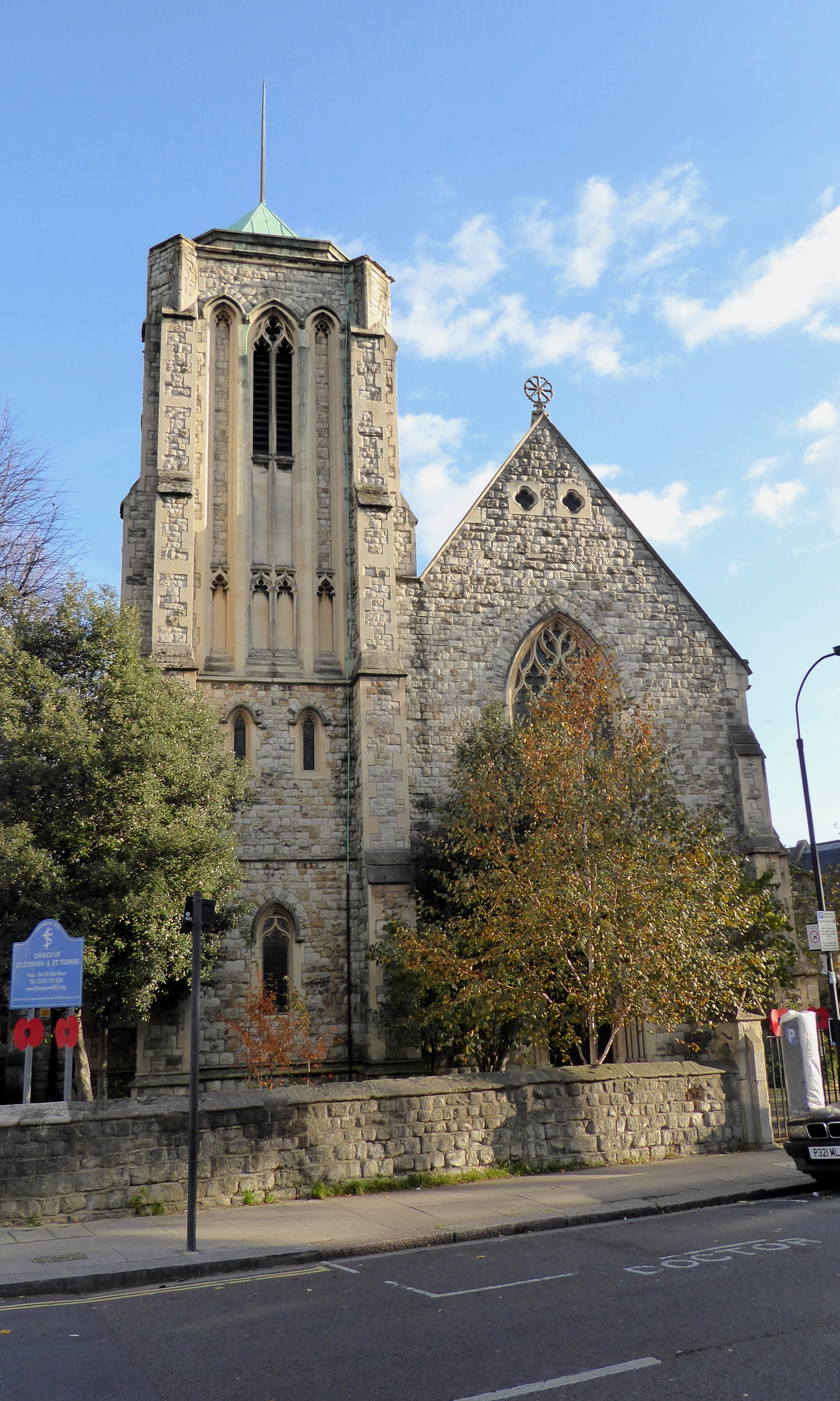
Church of St Stephen and St Thomas, Shepherd's Bush, circa 1849–1850

Most of Salvin's designs for major houses continued to be in the Tudor style. These include Keele Hall in Staffordshire for Ralph Sneyd (1793–1870), and Thoresby Hall in Nottinghamshire for Sydney Pierrepont, 3rd Earl Manvers. There were exceptions, including Penoyre House in Brecon, an Italianate villa-style house for Colonel John Lloyd Vaughan Watkins and Oxon Hoath in West Peckham, Kent in the French Châteauesque style for Sir William Geary, 3rd Baronet.

A major part of Salvin's work was to restore, refit and create castles. In 1835 he refaced Norwich Castle, in 1844 he repaired the ruins of Newark Castle and in 1845 he repaired the ruins of Carisbrooke Castle on the Isle of Wight. In the early 1840s the Queen's Gate of Caernarvon Castle collapsed, and in 1844 Salvin repaired it and rebuilt some of the other masonry of the castle. He also restored Naworth Castle in Cumbria after it was damaged by a fire on 18 May 1844.

In 1851 he surveyed the Beauchamp Tower of the Tower of London and subsequently restored the Salt, Wakefield and White Towers and the Chapel of St Peter ad Vincula. Following this he was instructed by Prince Albert to carry out work on Windsor Castle. This included replacing sash windows with lancets and mullioned windows and rebuilding the Clewer Tower. Salvin designed Peckforton Castle in Cheshire for John Tollemache, 1st Baron Tollemache as a recreation of a castle of the time of Edward I. In 1852 he started work on the restoration of Alnwick Castle in Northumberland. This included replacing one of the towers with a larger tower, the Prudhoe Tower, creating a porte-cochère, replacing windows and replanning the interior.

Salvin also restored and repaired 20 old churches and three cathedrals, and built 34 new churches. In the early 1840s he had worked on The Holy Sepulchre, Cambridge, employing James Rattee, and following this he was made an honorary member of the Cambridge Camden Society. He arranged for the removal of buildings around the south transept of Norwich Cathedral and reordered its choir. He also made alterations to Durham and Wells Cathedrals. In all he designed at least 34 new churches. Salvin's restorations were not to the liking of the Society for the Protection of Ancient Buildings, particularly his removal of "unwanted fabric" from churches. Other work carried out by Salvin included rebuilding the keep of Durham Castle for student accommodation, and work on restoring Trinity College, Cambridge.

== Later life ==
In 1857, while working on Warwick Castle, Salvin suffered a stroke but recovered from it. In 1860, his wife died and he designed a new house for himself, Hawksfold at Fernhurst, Sussex. In 1863 he was awarded the royal gold medal of the Royal Institute of British Architects and in 1879 he retired from formal practice. He died at Hawksfold in 1881 and was buried at Fernhurst. His estate was valued at over £78,000 (£6,620,000 in 2022).

== See also ==
- List of new churches by Anthony Salvin
- List of church restorations and alterations by Anthony Salvin
- List of work on castles and country houses by Anthony Salvin
- List of miscellaneous works by Anthony Salvin
