= Newark Castle, Nottinghamshire =

Grade I listed castle in Newark-on-Trent, England

Coordinates: 53.076298°N 0.813549°W

Newark Castle
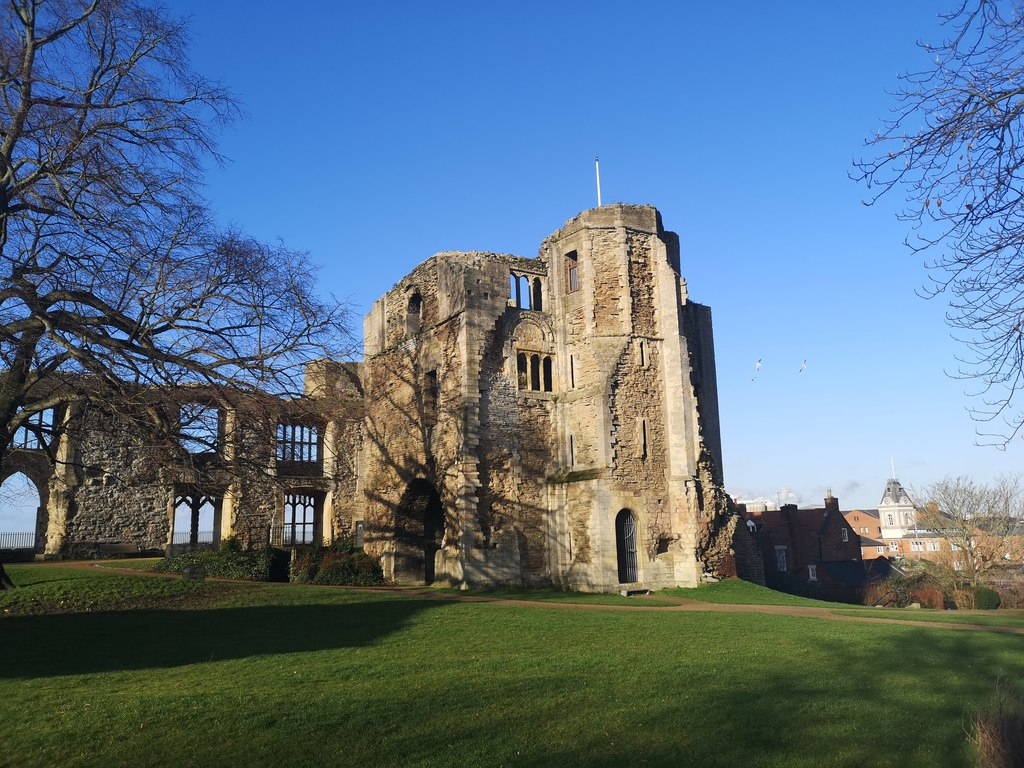

- Shown in Nottinghamshire
- Location: Castle Gate, Newark, Nottinghamshire, NG24 1AZ

History
- Built: 12th Century

Site notes
- Architect: Anthony Salvin
- Architectural style

Listed Building – Grade I
- Official name: Newark Castle
- Designated: 29 September 1950
- Reference no.: 1196278

National Register of Historic Parks and Gardens
- Designated: 28 November 1994
- Reference no.: 1001318
- Website: https://newarkcastleandgardens.co.uk/

Newark Castle, in Newark-on-Trent in the English county of Nottinghamshire, was founded in the mid 12th century by Alexander, Bishop of Lincoln. Originally a timber castle, it was rebuilt in stone towards the end of the century. The castle was slighted (dismantled) in the 17th century as a result of the English Civil War, and restored in the 19th century, first by Anthony Salvin in the 1840s and then by the corporation of Newark who bought the site in 1889.

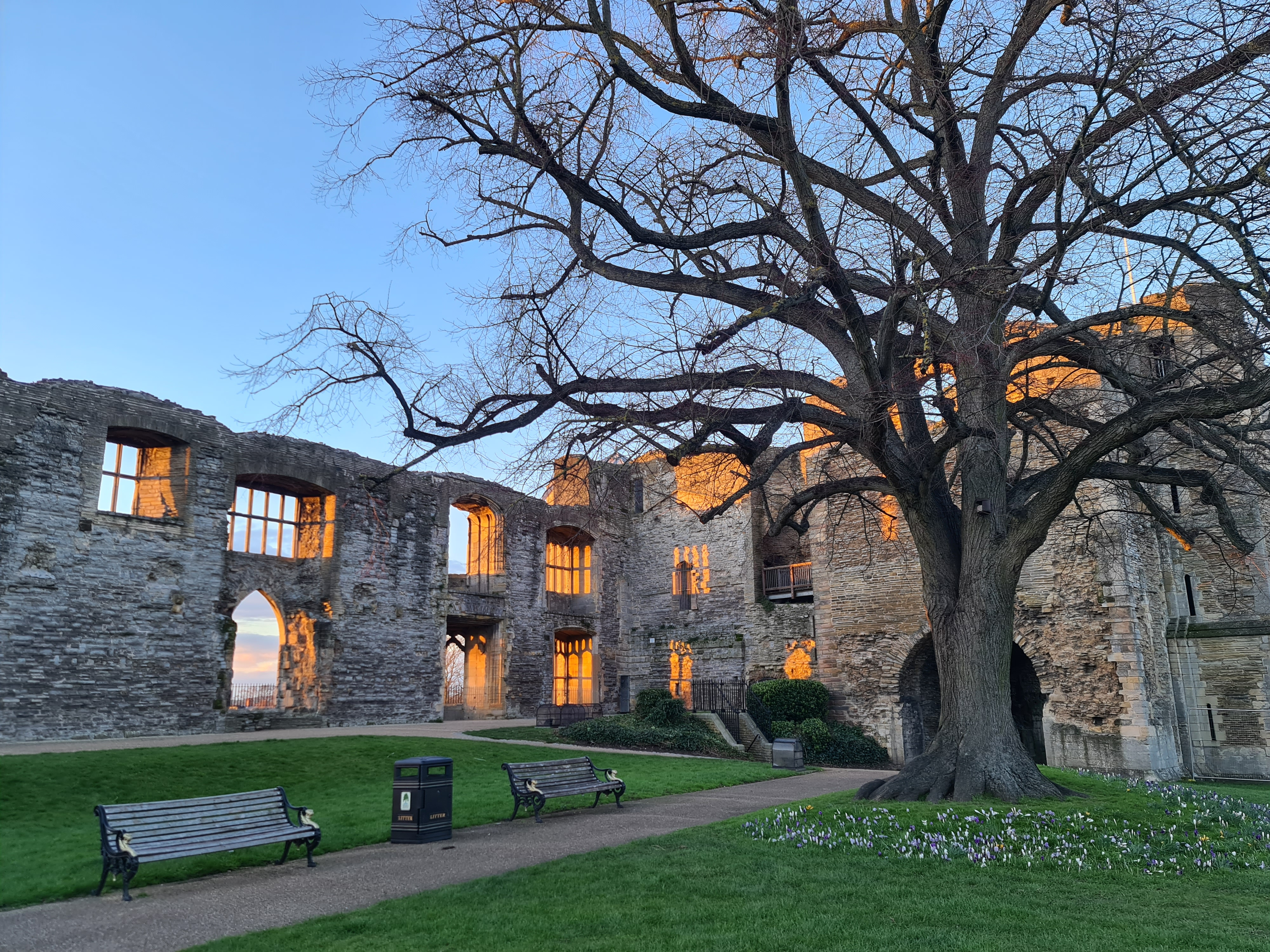
Newark Castle

== History ==
In a charter generally thought to date to 1135, King Henry I granted the Bishop of Lincoln permission to build a castle. The charter reads:

Henry, King of England to all the Barons and to the Sheriffs and to his ministers and faithful men of Nottinghamshire, Greeting. Know ye, that I have granted to Alexander, Bishop of Lincoln, that he may make a ditch and rampart of his fishpond of Niwerc upon the Fosseway and he may divert the Fosseway through the same town as he shall wish.

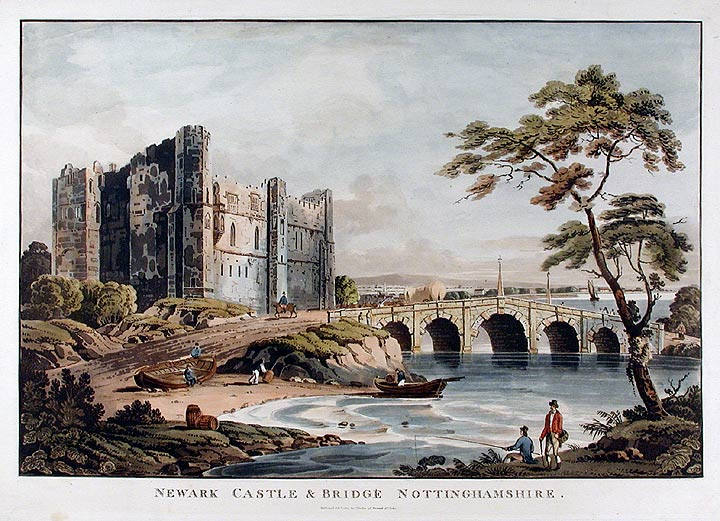
Newark Castle and Bridge circa 1812, before it was restored by Anthony Salvin

Alexander also established a mint at the castle. This early castle was most likely of timber construction, and was rebuilt in stone towards the end of the century.

On 29 August 1216, during the First Barons' War, King John ordered the destruction (slighting) of Newark Castle. The instruction was subsequently rescinded. John died after a feast at this castle on the night of 18 October 1216 from dysentery, according to tradition from eating a "surfeit of peaches".

The castle was slighted in 1648 and left derelict. Between 1845 and 1848 architect Anthony Salvin restored the castle, and in 1889 the corporation of Newark purchased the building and carried out further restoration work.

The castle is a scheduled monument, a "nationally important" historic building and archaeological site which has been given protection against unauthorised change. It is also a Grade I listed building (first listed in 1950) and recognised as an internationally important structure. The Gilstrap Heritage Centre is located on the castle grounds. The centre featured exhibits about the castle, and the town's history during the English Civil Wars. The Gilstrap Centre is now the Newark Registration Office. Admission to the gardens is free and tours are conducted by the Castle Ranger.

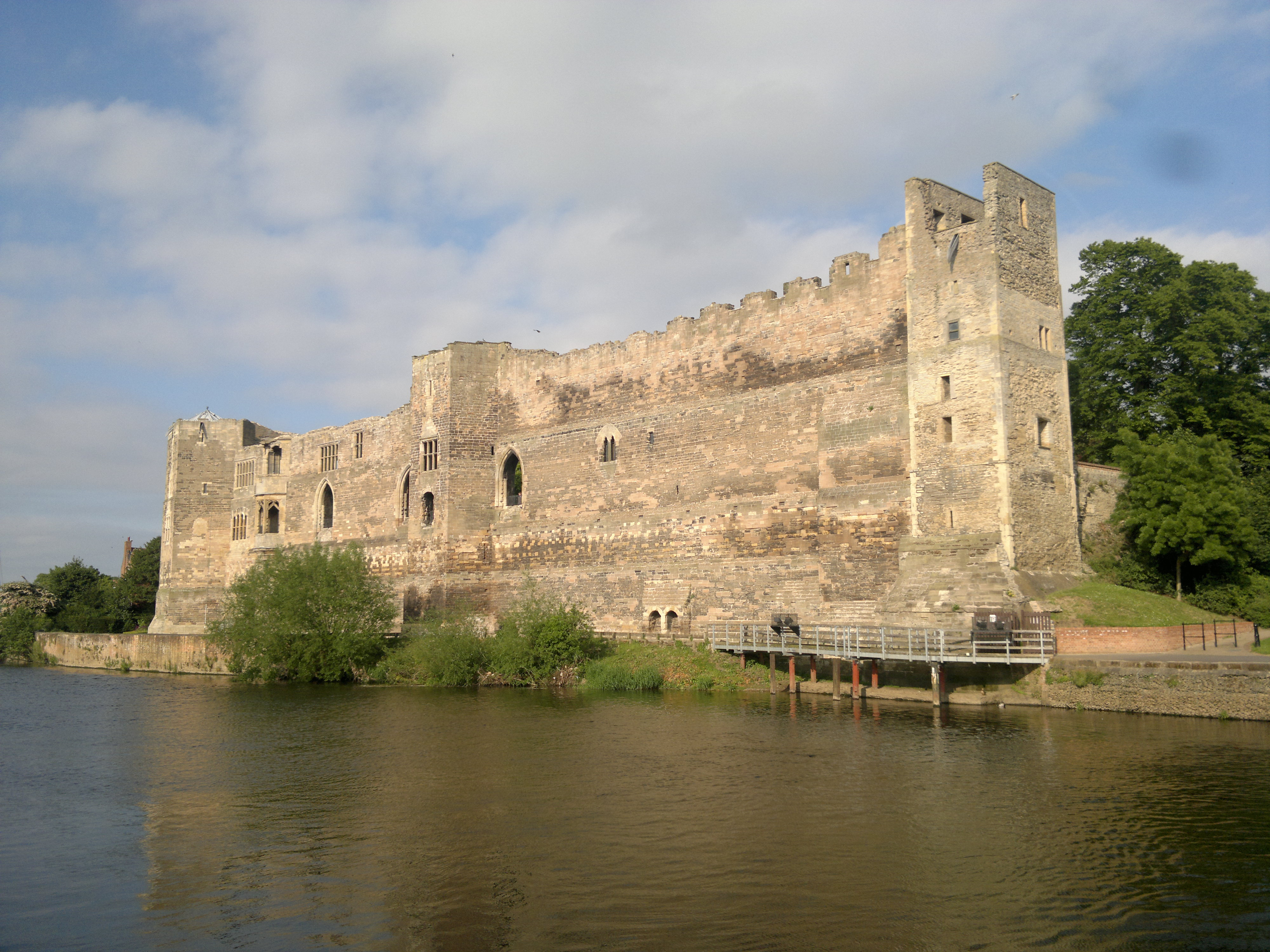
The castle seen from the west

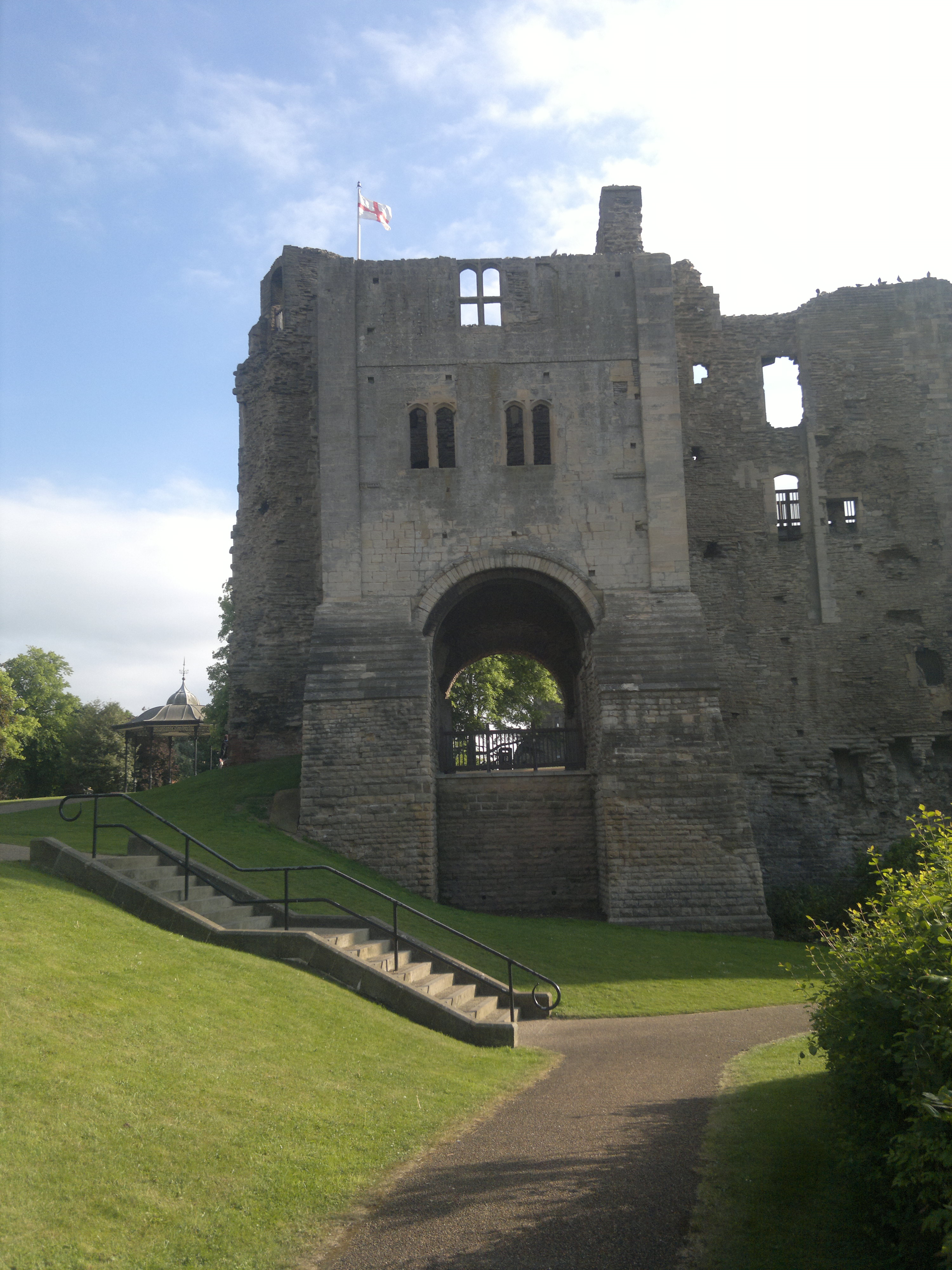
The 12th-century gatehouse seen from the south

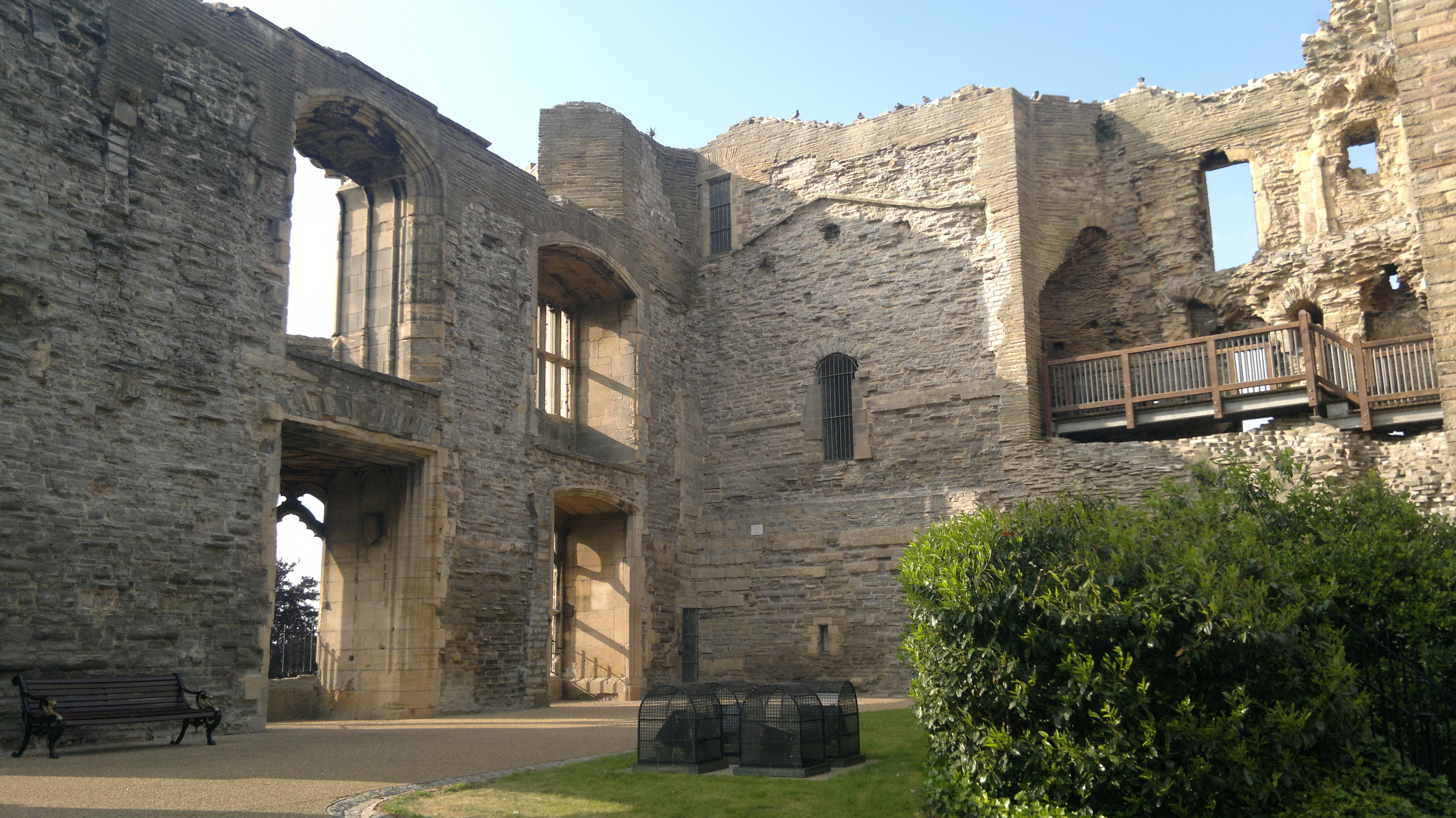
Inside the north west corner of the castle & location of Ranger's Office.

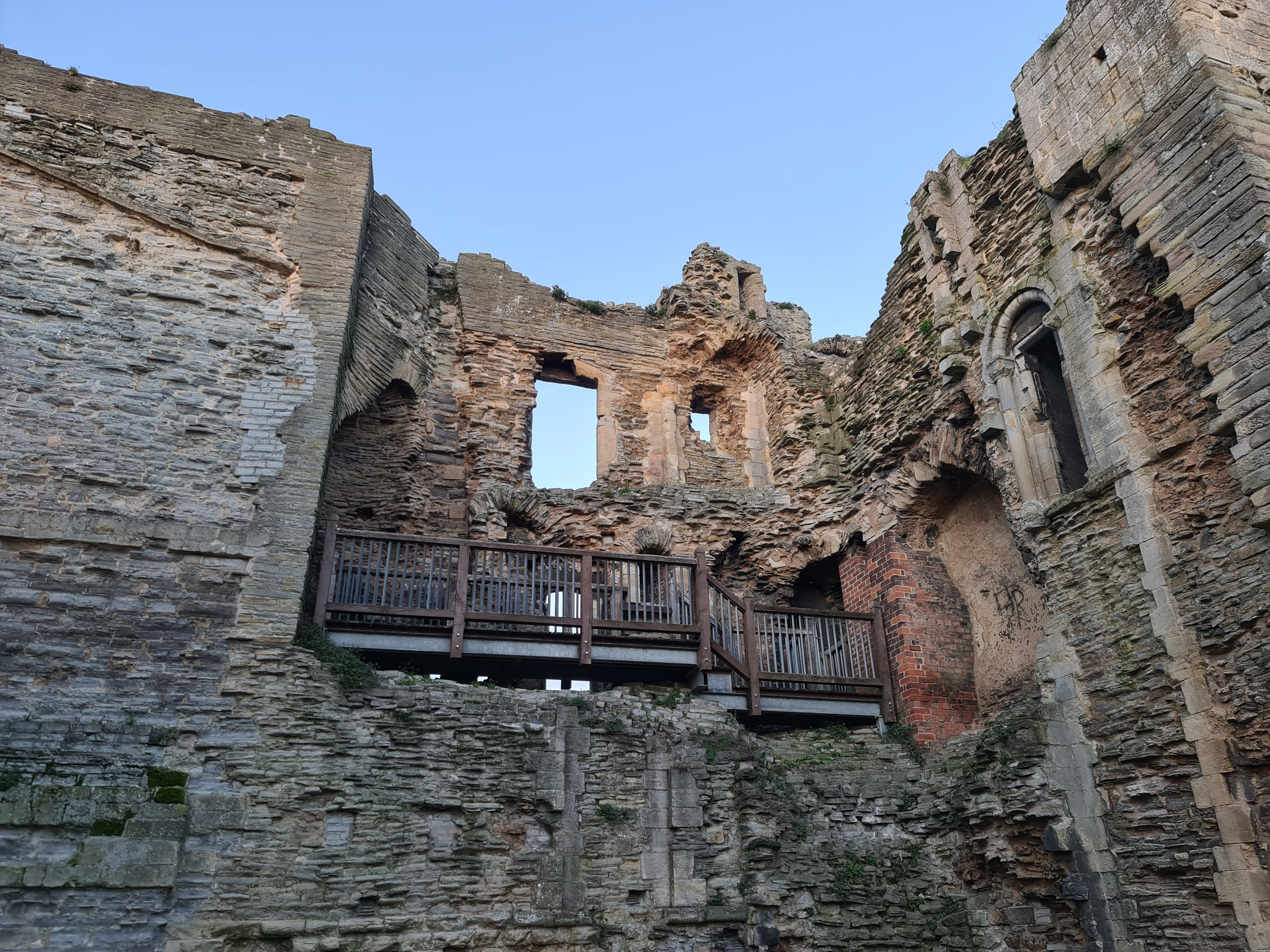
The internal wall of the castle.

== See also ==
- Grade I listed buildings in Nottinghamshire
- Listed buildings in Newark-on-Trent
- Sconce and Devon Park
