= Cheshire East Council elections =

Local government elections in Cheshire, England

Cheshire East Council elections are held every four years. Cheshire East Council is the local authority for the unitary authority of Cheshire East in Cheshire, England. Since the last boundary changes in 2011, 82 councillors have been elected from 52 wards.

== Council elections ==
- 2008 Cheshire East Council election
- 2011 Cheshire East Council election (new ward boundaries)
- 2015 Cheshire East Council election
- 2019 Cheshire East Council election
- 2023 Cheshire East Council election

== District result maps ==
2008 results map

2011 results map

2015 results map

2019 results map

2023 results map

== By-elections ==
=== 2008-2011 ===
Knutsford By-Election 9 October 2008
Party	Candidate	Votes	%	±%
Conservative	Steve Wilkinson	1,679	59.7	+2.1
Liberal Democrats	Caroline Aldhouse	817	29.0	+5.0
Labour	Laurie Burton	318	11.3	−7.2
Majority		862	30.7	
Turnout		2,814	28.0	
Conservative hold		Swing		

Cholmondeley By-Election 19 November 2009
Party	Candidate	Votes	%	±%
Conservative	Wilfred Davies	1,764	77.6	+6.6
Liberal Democrats	Bryan Halson	508	22.4	+4.9
Majority		1,256	55.2	
Turnout		2,272	19.6	
Conservative hold		Swing		

Alderley By-Election 30 September 2010
Party	Candidate	Votes	%	±%
Conservative	Matthew Lloyd	1,647	67.9	+16.8
Liberal Democrats	Oliver Romain	779	32.1	+8.5
Majority		868	35.8	
Turnout		2,426		
Conservative hold		Swing		

=== 2011-2015 ===
Macclesfield Hurdsfield By-Election 25 April 2013
Party	Candidate	Votes	%	±%
Labour	Steve Carter	341	36.7	−9.9
Liberal Democrats	Stephen Broadhead	239	25.8	−1.0
Conservative	Alastair Kennedy	168	18.1	−8.5
UKIP	David Lonsdale	132	14.2	+14.2
Green	John Knight	48	5.2	+5.2
Majority		102	11.0	
Turnout		928		
Labour hold		Swing		

Crewe West By-Election 13 March 2014
Party	Candidate	Votes	%	±%
Labour	Kevin Hickson	720	49.9	−6.6
UKIP	Richard Lee	387	26.8	+26.8
Independent	Chris Curran	159	11.0	+11.0
Conservative	Chris Waling	122	8.5	−16.8
Liberal Democrats	Robert Icke	55	3.8	−14.3
Majority		333	23.1	
Turnout		1,443		
Labour hold		Swing		

=== 2015-2019 ===
Congleton East by-election, 29 October 2015
Party	Candidate	Votes	%	±%
Conservative	Geoff Baggott	700	36.5	−2.7
Liberal Democrats	Denis Murphy	542	28.3	+18.6
Labour	Robert Boston	409	21.3	+1.4
UKIP	Dawn Allen	266	13.9	−3.1
Majority		158	8.2	
Turnout		1,917		
Conservative hold		Swing		

Bollington by-election, 16 February 2017
Party	Candidate	Votes	%	±%
Bollington First	James Nicholas	939	50.6	+13.5
Conservative	Philip Bolton	319	17.2	−13.4
Labour	Rob Vernon	239	12.9	−8.5
Liberal Democrats	Sam al-Hamdani	198	10.7	−0.2
Green	Richard Purslow	162	8.7	+8.7
Majority		620	33.4	
Turnout		1,857		
Bollington First gain from Conservative		Swing		

Crewe East by-election, 5 October 2017
Party	Candidate	Votes	%	±%
Labour	Joy Bratherton	1,174	60.7	+14.8
Conservative	Mary Addison	542	28.0	+6.2
UKIP	Eddie Ankers	158	8.2	−14.7
Green	Melanie English	59	3.1	−6.4
Majority		632	32.7	
Turnout		1,933		
Labour hold		Swing		

Bunbury by-election, 22 March 2018
Party	Candidate	Votes	%	±%
Conservative	Chris Green	663	53.3	−16.9
Liberal Democrats	Mark Jones	342	27.5	+27.5
Labour	Jake Lomax	178	14.3	−3.4
Green	Mark Sharkey	60	4.8	−7.2
Majority		321	25.8	
Turnout		1,243		
Conservative hold		Swing		

=== 2019-2023 ===
Crewe South by-election, 27 February 2020
Party	Candidate	Votes	%	±%
Labour	Laura Smith	854	54.0	
Conservative	Martin Deakin	566	35.8	
Green	Richard McCarthy	69	4.4	
Independent	Roy Cartlidge	67	4.2	
Independent	Brian Silvester	34	2.2	
Majority		288	18.2	
Turnout		1,580	20.0	
Labour hold		Swing		

Crewe West by-election, 6 May 2021
Party	Candidate	Votes	%	±%
Labour	Connor Naismith	724	42.3	−19.9
Conservative	Teja Vaddala	539	31.5	+7.5
Crewe First	Brian George Silvester	184	10.7	new
Green	Melanie Ruth English	126	7.4	new
Independent	Roy Cartlidge	72	4.2	−9.6
Liberal Democrats	Paul James Weaver	55	3.2	new
Workers Party	Chris McGrane	13	0.8	new
Majority		185	10.8	
Turnout		1723	22.6	
Labour hold		Swing	-13.7	

Wilmslow Dean Row by-election, 2 September 2021
Party	Candidate	Votes	%	±%
Residents of Wilmslow	Lata Anderson	447	43.3	−18.7
Conservative	Frank McCarthy	354	40.2	+9.6
Liberal Democrats	Birgitta Hoffmann	46	5.2	new
Green	James Andrew Booth	34	3.9	new
Majority		93	10.6	
Turnout		881	22.5	
Residents of Wilmslow hold		Swing	-14.2	

=== 2023-2027 ===
Crewe Central by-election, 8 February 2024
Party	Candidate	Votes	%	±%
Conservative	Roger Morris	335	43.3	+19.8
Labour	Kim Jamson	277	35.8	−18.9
Putting Crewe First	Brian Silvester	128	16.5	+1.2
Women's Equality	Vicky Pulman	22	2.8	new
Green	Te Ata Browne	12	1.6	new
Majority		58	7.5	
Turnout		774		
Conservative gain from Labour		Swing		

Crewe West by-election, 5 September 2024
Party	Candidate	Votes	%	±%
Labour	Ben Wye	553	43.4	
Reform	Nick Goulding	333	26.1	
Conservative	David Simcox	217	17.0	
Putting Crewe First	Brian Silvester	109	8.5	
Green	Melanie English	63	4.9	
Majority		220	17.3	
Turnout		1,275	16.5	
Labour hold		Swing		

Wilmslow Lacey Green by-election, 11 September 2025
Party	Candidate	Votes	%	±%
Conservative	Khumi Burton	370	29.8	−8.4
Labour	Steve Greaney	300	24.2	+24.2
Reform	Nick Goulding	288	23.2	+23.2
Residents of Wilmslow	Elaine Evans	215	17.3	−30.3
Green	Amanda Iremonger	67	5.4	+5.4
Majority		70	5.6	
Turnout		1,240		
Conservative gain from Residents of Wilmslow		Swing		

Macclesfield Central by-election, 20 November 2025
Party	Candidate	Votes	%	±%
Green	John Knight	750	41.8	
Labour	James Barber-Chadwick	513	28.6	
Reform	Alan Miles	283	15.8	
Conservative	Beverley Dooley	164	9.1	
Equality Party	Kim Slater	45	2.5	
Liberal Democrats	Stephen Broadhead	40	2.2	
Majority		237	13.2	
Turnout		1,795		
Green gain from Labour		Swing		
