= 2023 Cheshire East Council election =

2023 English local election

- 4 May 2023

All 82 seats to Cheshire East Council 42 seats needed for a majority

	First party	Second party	Third party
Leader	Janet Clowes	Sam Corcoran
Party	Conservative	Labour	Independent
Last election	34 seats, 35.5%	25 seats, 27.9%	11 seats, 11.1%
Seats before	30	24	17
Seats after	33	31	10
Seat change	▼1	▲6	▼1
Popular vote	64,154	52,712	19,338
Percentage	36.7%	30.2%	11.1%
	Fourth party	Fifth party	Sixth party
Leader		Phil Williams	Craig Browne
Party	Residents	Liberal Democrats	Alderley Edge First
Last election	4 seats, 3.1%	4 seats, 11.0%	1 seat, 0.7%
Seats before		4	1
Seats won	5	2	1
Seat change	▲1	▼2	Steady
Popular vote	5,143	13,983	1,095
Percentage	2.9%	8.0%	0.63%
- Winner of each seat at the 2023 Cheshire East Council election
Leader before election
Sam Corcoran
Labour
No overall control
Leader after election
Sam Corcoran
Labour
No overall control

The 2023 Cheshire East Council election took place on Thursday 4 May 2023 to elect all 82 members of Cheshire East Council in Cheshire, England. This was on the same day as other local elections across England.

The council had been under no overall control prior to the election, being run by a Labour minority administration with support from independent councillors. The council remained under no overall control after the election. The Conservatives formed the largest single party, but an agreement was reached between Labour and most of the independent councillors to continue running the council.

== Summary ==
=== Election results ===
2023 Cheshire East Council election
Party	Candidates	Seats	Gains	Losses	Net gain/loss	Seats %	Votes %	Votes	+/−
Conservative	81	33	4	5	-1	40.24	36.70	64,154	+3,315
Labour	60	31	10	4	+6	37.80	30.15	52,712	
Independent	25	10	4	5	-1	12.20	11.06	19,338	
Residents of Wilmslow	5	5	1	0	+1	6.09	2.94	5,143	
Liberal Democrats	31	2	0	2	-2	2.44	8.00	13,983	
Alderley Edge First	1	1	0	0	0	1.22	0.63	1,095	
Green	33	0	0	0	0	0.00	6.95	12,148	
Putting Crewe First	10	0	0	0	0	0.00	2.05	3,580	
Bollington First	2	0	0	2	-2	0.00	0.68	1,195	
Women's Equality	1	0	0	0	0	0.00	0.65	1,132	
Reform	2	0	0	0	0	0.00	0.07	114	
SDP	1	0	0	0	0	0.00	0.09	157	
Monster Raving Loony	1	0	0	0	0	0.00	0.03	57	
Handforth Ratepayers Association	0	0		1	-1	0.00	0.00	0	

== Results by ward ==
The results for each ward were:

=== Alderley Edge ===
Alderley Edge (1 seat)
Party	Candidate	Votes	%
Alderley Edge First	Craig Browne	1,095	79.00
Conservative	Carl Curran	195	14.07
Green	Emma Boxer	96	6.93
Turnout			37.95
Alderley Edge First hold			

=== Alsager ===
Alsager (3 seats)
Party	Candidate	Votes	%
Liberal Democrats	Rod Fletcher	1,653	63.38
Labour	Brian Drake	1,326	50.84
Liberal Democrats	Reg Kain	1,281	49.12
Labour	Michael Unett	1,210	46.40
Conservative	Wendy Whittaker-Large	1,068	40.95
Conservative	Sam Worthington	845	32.40
Green	Hilary Robinson	679	26.04
Green	Richard McCarthy	653	25.04
Turnout		2,608	32.20
Liberal Democrats hold			
Labour gain from Liberal Democrats			
Liberal Democrats hold			

=== Audlem ===
Audlem (1 seat)
Party	Candidate	Votes	%
Conservative	Rachel Anne Bailey	1,023	64.22
Liberal Democrats	John Phillips	570	35.78
Turnout			37.47
Conservative hold			

=== Bollington ===
Bollington (2 seats)
Party	Candidate	Votes	%
Labour	Ken Edwards	992	38.35
Labour	John Place	730	28.22
Conservative	Jon Weston	714	27.60
Bollington First	Amanda Stott	646	24.97
Liberal Democrats	Johanna Maitland	562	21.72
Bollington First	James William David Nicholas	549	21.22
Conservative	John Withers	535	20.68
Green	Jennifer Allen	302	11.67
Green	Liam Bergin	163	6.30
Turnout		2,587	39.04
Labour gain from Bollington First			
Labour gain from Bollington First			

=== Brereton Rural ===
Brereton Rural (1 seat)
Party	Candidate	Votes	%
Conservative	John Wray	841	42.11
Liberal Democrats	Robert Douglas	627	31.40
Labour	Mark Mitchell	529	26.49
Turnout			32.38
Conservative hold			

=== Broken Cross and Upton ===
Broken Cross and Upton (2 seats)
Party	Candidate	Votes	%
Labour	Rob Vernon	1,301	61.37
Labour	Judy Snowball	1,248	58.87
Conservative	Gareth Jones	894	42.17
Conservative	Uche John	854	40.28
Turnout		2,120	33.96
Labour hold			
Labour hold			

=== Bunbury ===
Bunbury (1 seat)
Party	Candidate	Votes	%
Conservative	Rebecca Posnett	912	51.88
Liberal Democrats	Jonathan Bill	846	48.12
Turnout			35.71
Conservative hold			

=== Chelford ===
Chelford (1 seat)
Party	Candidate	Votes	%
Conservative	Anthony Harrison	913	65.97
Liberal Democrats	Nicola Standitch	275	19.87
Green	Nick Speakman	196	14.16
Turnout			35.49
Conservative hold			

=== Congleton East ===
Congleton East (3 seats)
Party	Candidate	Votes	%
Independent	Rob Moreton	1,322	40.71
Conservative	Sally Holland	1,297	39.94
Conservative	David Brown	1,151	35.45
Women's Equality	Kay Wesley	1,132	34.86
Conservative	Glen Williams	955	29.41
Labour	Sarah Russell	895	27.56
Independent	Heather Pearce	813	25.04
Green	Lisa Miller	760	23.41
Liberal Democrats	Denis Murphy	605	18.63
Liberal Democrats	Michael Duffy	451	13.89
Independent	Martin Amies	448	13.80
Turnout		3,247	35.15
Independent hold			
Conservative gain from Liberal Democrats			
Conservative hold			

=== Congleton West ===
Congleton West (3 seats)
Party	Candidate	Votes	%
Conservative	Emma Hall	1,207	37.46
Conservative	George Hayes	1,183	36.72
Labour	Heather Seddon	1,179	36.59
Conservative	Amanda Martin	1,080	33.52
Liberal Democrats	Suzy Firkin	1,069	33.18
Independent	Suzie Akers Smith	1,066	33.09
Independent	Mark Edwardson	1,005	31.19
Liberal Democrats	Robert Hemsley	764	23.71
Green	Olga Whitmore	671	20.83
Independent	Mark Hill	565	17.54
Turnout		3,222	31.18
Conservative hold			
Conservative hold			
Labour gain from Independent			

=== Crewe Central ===
Crewe Central (1 seat)
Party	Candidate	Votes	%
Labour	Anthony Critchley	448	54.70
Conservative	Christopher Waling	192	23.44
Putting Crewe First	Ireneusz Kryczka	126	15.38
Reform	Matthew Wood	53	6.47
Turnout			17.35
Labour hold			

=== Crewe East ===
Crewe East (3 seats)
Party	Candidate	Votes	%
Labour	Hazel Faddes	1,329	53.78
Labour	Martin Edwards	1,199	48.52
Labour	Jill Rhodes	1,168	47.27
Putting Crewe First	Richard Ford	646	26.14
Putting Crewe First	Jackie Barthelmes	601	24.32
Putting Crewe First	Helen Elliott	590	23.88
Conservative	Jonathan Bebbington	442	17.89
Conservative	Carol Groves	408	16.51
Conservative	Peter Hargreaves	386	15.62
Green	Melanie English	314	12.71
Green	Ian Mumford	223	9.02
Green	Gareth Woods	166	6.72
Turnout		2,471	22.79
Labour hold			
Labour hold			
Labour hold			

=== Crewe North ===
Crewe North (1 seat)
Party	Candidate	Votes	%
Labour	Joy Bratherton	483	51.77
Putting Crewe First	Brian Silvester	334	35.80
Conservative	Daniel Hill	116	12.43
Turnout			26.14
Labour hold			

=== Crewe South ===
Crewe South (2 seats)
Party	Candidate	Votes	%
Labour	Laura Smith	1,026	63.29
Labour	Dawn Clark	1,011	62.37
Conservative	Ryan Moore	353	21.78
Putting Crewe First	Tom Maguire	314	19.37
Conservative	Adam Boulton-Rawlinson	299	18.45
Putting Crewe First	Toni Mortimer	263	16.22
Turnout		3,242	21.38
Labour hold			
Labour hold			

=== Crewe St. Barnabas ===
Crewe St. Barnabas (1 seat)
Party	Candidate	Votes	%
Conservative	James Pratt	348	49.50
Labour	Sally Handley	266	37.84
Putting Crewe First	Toni Mortimer	89	12.66
Turnout			20.07
Conservative gain from Labour			

=== Crewe West ===
Crewe West (2 seats)
Party	Candidate	Votes	%
Labour	Marilyn Houston	965	60.01
Labour	Connor Naismith	911	56.65
Putting Crewe First	Stephen Macallan	318	19.78
Putting Crewe First	Craig Porter	299	18.59
Conservative	Daniel Bull	277	17.23
Conservative	Jacquie Weatherill	277	17.23
Turnout		1,608	21.42
Labour hold			
Labour hold			

=== Dane Valley ===
Dane Valley (2 seats)
Party	Candidate	Votes	%
Conservative	Andrew Kolker	1,616	56.78
Conservative	Russell Chadwick	1,394	48.98
Liberal Democrats	Diane Tams	1,065	37.42
Labour	Craig Hynes	756	26.56
Green	Martin Wood	631	22.17
Green	Robert Green	271	9.52
Turnout		2,846	38.36
Conservative hold			
Conservative hold			

=== Disley ===
Disley (1 seat)
Party	Candidate	Votes	%
Conservative	Sue Adams	886	56.65
Labour	Nell Carter	533	34.08
Independent	Paul Moss	145	9.27
Turnout			40.59
Conservative gain from Independent			

=== Gawsworth ===
Gawsworth (1 seat)
Party	Candidate	Votes	%
Conservative	Lesley Smetham	843	63.34
Labour	Sam Hale	204	15.33
Liberal Democrats	Eleanor Hall	180	13.52
Green	Andrew Wheatstone	104	7.81
Turnout			37.21
Conservative hold			

=== Handforth ===
Handforth (2 seats)
Party	Candidate	Votes	%
Independent	Julie Smith	1,474	68.98
Independent	John Smith	1,300	60.83
Labour	Ribia Nisa	668	31.26
Conservative	Simon Hutchence	312	14.60
Conservative	Matthew Robertson	291	13.62
Liberal Democrats	James Earl	273	12.77
Turnout		2,137	32.98
Independent hold			
Independent gain from Handforth Ratepayers' Association			

One of the two Handforth seats had been vacant since November 2022 following the death of the previous Handforth Ratepayers' Association councillor Barry Burkhill.

=== Haslington ===
Haslington (2 seats)
Party	Candidate	Votes	%
Conservative	Steven Edgar	1,240	52.63
Conservative	Alison Heler	1,149	48.77
Labour	Simon Richards	1,027	43.59
Labour	Jamie Messent	943	40.03
Green	Te Ata Browne	379	16.09
Turnout		2,356	34.60
Conservative hold			
Conservative hold			

=== High Legh ===
High Legh (1 seat)
Party	Candidate	Votes	%
Conservative	Kate Parkinson	865	63.00
Liberal Democrats	Christopher Fortune	451	32.85
Monster Raving Loony	Andy Sheik El Wright'O	57	4.15
Turnout			37.9
Conservative hold			

=== Knutsford ===
Knutsford (3 seats)
Party	Candidate	Votes	%
Conservative	Stewart Gardiner	1,716	50.07
Conservative	Tony Dean	1,672	48.79
Conservative	Peter Coan	1,662	48.50
Labour	Sue Addison	1,348	39.33
Green	Amanda Iremonger	1,090	31.81
Labour	Kevin Harkin	963	28.10
Independent	April Johnson	708	20.66
Liberal Democrats	Adrian Cardwell	645	18.82
Independent	Rex Mears	519	15.14
Turnout		3,427	36.8
Conservative hold			
Conservative hold			
Conservative gain from Independent			

=== Leighton ===
Leighton (1 seat)
Party	Candidate	Votes	%
Labour	Clair Chapman	456	36.69
Independent	Jim Weir	412	33.15
Conservative	Teja Vaddala	375	30.17
Turnout			26.46
Labour gain from Independent			

=== Macclesfield Central ===
Macclesfield Central (2 seats)
Party	Candidate	Votes	%
Labour	Liz Braithwaite	1,368	69.76
Labour	Ashley Farrall	1,102	56.20
Green	John Knight	558	28.45
Conservative	Abhishika Srivastav	345	17.59
Conservative	Jessica Beaumont	328	16.73
Liberal Democrats	Stephen Broadhead	251	12.80
Turnout		1,961	29.7
Labour hold			
Labour hold			

=== Macclesfield East ===
Macclesfield East (1 seat)
Party	Candidate	Votes	%
Independent	Mick Warren	789	58.88
Labour	Terry Bell	292	21.79
Conservative	Nicholas Taylor	120	8.96
Green	Lindy Brett	111	8.28
Liberal Democrats	Christopher Lovell	28	2.09
Turnout			37.13
Independent hold			

=== Macclesfield Hurdsfield ===
Macclesfield Hurdsfield (1 seat)
Party	Candidate	Votes	%
Labour	Sarah Bennett-Wake	640	69.19
Liberal Democrats	Steve Broadhurst	173	18.70
Conservative	Barrie Malpas	112	12.11
Turnout			27.17
Labour hold			

The Macclesfield Hurdsfield seat had been vacant since December 2022 following the death of the previous Labour councillor Steve Carter.

=== Macclesfield South ===
Macclesfield South (2 seats)
Party	Candidate	Votes	%
Labour	Fiona Wilson	916	53.47
Labour	Brian Puddicombe	868	50.67
Independent	Andy Oldfield	504	29.42
Conservative	David Dooley	308	17.98
Conservative	Joyce Beasley	293	17.10
Independent	Eddie Murphy	292	17.05
Green	John Peckham	258	15.06
Turnout		1,713	27.92
Labour hold			
Labour hold			

=== Macclesfield Tytherington ===
Macclesfield Tytherington (2 seats)
Party	Candidate	Votes	%
Independent	David Edwardes	1,472	55.11
Independent	Louise Gilman	1,117	41.82
Conservative	Beverley Dooley	878	32.87
Conservative	John Le Moignan	755	28.27
Labour	John Bowden	606	22.69
Green	David Mayers	347	12.99
Green	Walter Houston	192	7.19
Turnout		2,671	38.95
Independent hold			
Independent hold			

One of the Macclesfield Tytherington seats had been vacant since November 2022 following the resignation of the previous independent councillor Lloyd Roberts.

=== Macclesfield West and Ivy ===
Macclesfield West and Ivy (2 seats)
Party	Candidate	Votes	%
Labour	Nicholas Peter Mannion	1,176	72.01
Labour	Mary Brooks	1,061	64.97
Conservative	Timothy Swatridge	559	34.23
Conservative	Rajeev Rajan	511	31.29
Turnout		1,633	29.96
Labour hold			
Labour hold			

=== Middlewich ===
Middlewich (3 seats)
Party	Candidate	Votes	%
Labour	Carol Bulman	1,088	39.97
Independent	Marshall Garnet	1,084	39.82
Independent	John Bird	1,078	39.60
Labour	Michael Hunter	1,036	38.06
Labour	Jonathan Parry	1,030	37.84
Conservative	Paul Edwards	811	29.79
Conservative	David Harrop	782	28.73
Green	Cerys Jones	667	24.50
Conservative	Robert Brittain	619	22.74
Turnout		2,722	26.83
Labour hold			
Independent gain from Labour			
Independent gain from Labour			

=== Mobberley ===
Mobberley (1 seat)
Party	Candidate	Votes	%
Conservative	Hannah Moss	884	73.00
Labour	Paul Thomson	205	16.93
Liberal Democrats	Kevin Boyle	122	10.07
Turnout			34.86
Conservative hold			

=== Nantwich North and West ===
Nantwich North and West (2 seats)
Party	Candidate	Votes	%
Labour	Anna Burton	1,109	51.63
Independent	Arthur Moran	768	35.75
Conservative	Vicky Higham	724	33.71
Conservative	John Statham	637	29.66
Independent	Stuart Bostock	593	27.61
Green	Kim Hayes	317	14.76
Green	Tom Levins	182	8.47
Turnout		2,148	35.14
Labour gain from Independent			
Independent hold			

=== Nantwich South and Stapeley ===
Nantwich South and Stapeley (2 seats)
Party	Candidate	Votes	%
Labour	Geoffrey Smith	1,483	52.85
Labour	John Priest	1,478	52.67
Conservative	Andrew Martin	1,395	49.71
Conservative	Peter Groves	1,316	46.90
Turnout		2,806	39.92
Labour gain from Conservative			
Labour gain from Conservative			

=== Odd Rode ===
Odd Rode (2 seats)
Party	Candidate	Votes	%
Conservative	Patrick Redstone	1,152	57.23
Conservative	Liz Wardlaw	1,131	56.18
Labour	Ursula Griffiths	900	44.71
Labour	Gareth Lindop	886	44.01
Turnout		2,013	31.89
Conservative hold			
Conservative hold			

=== Poynton East and Pott Shrigley ===
Poynton East and Pott Shrigley (2 seats)
Party	Candidate	Votes	%
Conservative	Jos Saunders	1,310	54.49
Conservative	Hayley Whitaker	1,256	52.25
Labour	Sarah Marshall	810	33.69
Labour	Geoff Thompson	797	33.15
Green	James Booth	505	21.01
SDP	Tim O'Rourke	157	6.53
Turnout		2,404	41.11
Conservative hold			
Conservative hold			

=== Poynton West and Adlington ===
Poynton West and Adlington (2 seats)
Party	Candidate	Votes	%
Conservative	Michael Beanland	1,432	51.64
Conservative	Mike Sewart	1,421	51.24
Labour	Tony Penny	898	32.38
Labour	Amy House	829	29.90
Green	Kathy Booth	595	21.46
Turnout		2,773	39.67
Conservative hold			
Conservative hold			

=== Prestbury ===
Prestbury (1 seat)
Party	Candidate	Votes	%
Conservative	Thelma Jackson	980	74.36
Independent	Stuart Redgard	338	25.64
Turnout			36.1
Conservative hold			

=== Sandbach Elworth ===
Sandbach Elworth (1 seat)
Party	Candidate	Votes	%
Independent	Nicola Cook	718	43.05
Labour	Kathryn Flavell	616	36.93
Conservative	Arabella Holland	253	15.17
Liberal Democrats	Callum Chalmers	81	4.86
Turnout			34.09
Independent gain from Labour			

=== Sandbach Ettiley Heath and Wheelock ===
Sandbach Ettiley Heath and Wheelock (1 seat)
Party	Candidate	Votes	%
Labour	Laura Crane	715	53.76
Conservative	Martin Deakin	445	33.46
Green	Patricia Lloyd	99	7.44
Liberal Democrats	Michelle Hough	71	5.34
Turnout			30.14
Labour hold			

=== Sandbach Heath and East ===
Sandbach Heath and East (1 seat)
Party	Candidate	Votes	%
Labour	Sam Corcoran	563	40.83
Conservative	Tim Wheatcroft	423	30.67
Independent	Dave Poole	322	23.35
Green	Peter Kent	71	5.15
Turnout			33.3
Labour hold			

=== Sandbach Town ===
Sandbach Town (1 seat)
Party	Candidate	Votes	%
Conservative	Mike Muldoon	688	45.59
Labour	John Arnold	598	39.63
Liberal Democrats	Artie Chalmers	141	9.34
Green	Hope Voyce	82	5.43
Turnout			35.87
Conservative hold			

=== Shavington ===
Shavington (1 seat)
Party	Candidate	Votes	%
Labour	Linda Buchanan	573	40.81
Independent	David Marren	486	34.62
Conservative	Claire Wain	345	24.27
Turnout			29.8
Labour gain from Conservative			

=== Sutton ===
Sutton (1 seat)
Party	Candidate	Votes	%
Conservative	Chris O'Leary	678	45.47
Liberal Democrats	Trevor Priestman	311	20.86
Labour	Steve Kay	276	18.51
Green	Laura Jones	226	15.16
Turnout			42.65
Conservative hold			

=== Willaston and Rope ===
Willaston and Rope (1 seat)
Party	Candidate	Votes	%
Conservative	Allen Gage	957	54.13
Labour	Ben Wye	630	35.63
Green	Richard Bennett	120	6.79
Reform	Julie Fousert	61	3.45
Turnout			41.1
Conservative hold			

=== Wilmslow Dean Row ===
Wilmslow Dean Row (1 seat)
Party	Candidate	Votes	%
Residents of Wilmslow	Lata Anderson	703	53.42
Conservative	Jack Illingworth	481	36.55
Liberal Democrats	Olivia Walker	132	10.03
Turnout			32.46
Residents of Wilmslow hold			

=== Wilmslow East ===
Wilmslow East (1 seat)
Party	Candidate	Votes	%
Residents of Wilmslow	David Jefferay	832	64.00
Conservative	John Duckworth	383	29.46
Liberal Democrats	Sarah Murphy	85	6.54
Turnout			39.93
Residents of Wilmslow hold			

=== Wilmslow Lacey Green ===
Wilmslow Lacey Green (1 seat)
Party	Candidate	Votes	%
Residents of Wilmslow	Chris Hilliard	591	47.55
Conservative	Don Stockton	475	38.21
Liberal Democrats	James Robin	177	14.24
Turnout			32.09
Residents of Wilmslow gain from Conservative			

=== Wilmslow West and Chorley ===
Wilmslow West and Chorley (2 seats)
Party	Candidate	Votes	%
Residents of Wilmslow	Mark Goldsmith	1,560	55.08
Residents of Wilmslow	Michael Gorman	1,457	51.45
Conservative	Barry Estill	977	34.50
Conservative	Hannan Sarwar	787	27.79
Green	Michelle Anderson	539	19.03
Liberal Democrats	Gareth Wilson	366	12.92
Turnout		2,832	37.42
Residents of Wilmslow hold			
Residents of Wilmslow hold			

=== Wistaston ===
Wistaston (2 seats)
Party	Candidate	Votes	%
Labour	Alan Coiley	1,418	51.83
Conservative	Margaret Joan Simon	1,321	48.28
Labour	Kim Jamson	1,295	47.33
Conservative	Gary Poole	1,120	40.94
Green	Claire Wilkinson	340	12.43
Turnout		2,736	37.05
Labour gain from Conservative			
Conservative hold			

=== Wrenbury ===
Wrenbury (1 seat)
Party	Candidate	Votes	%
Conservative	James Pearson	806	49.69
Liberal Democrats	Sacha Sandbach	575	35.45
Green	Dave Manning	241	14.86
Turnout			35.18
Conservative hold			

=== Wybunbury ===
Wybunbury (1 seat)
Party	Candidate	Votes	%
Conservative	Janet Christine Clowes	1,170	70.52
Labour	Dennis Straine-Francis	336	20.25
Liberal Democrats	Stephen Ford	153	9.22
Turnout			36.9
Conservative hold			

== Changes 2023–2027 ==
- Laura Smith, elected as a Labour councillor for Crewe South, had the whip withdrawn in March 2024 after refusing to vote with the party on the council's budget, and has sat as an independent socialist since.
- Hannah Moss, elected as a Conservative councillor for Mobberley, left the Conservative group in April 2024 to sit as an independent, before rejoining the Conservative group in March 2025.
- Reg Kain, elected as a Liberal Democrat councillor for Alsager and former leader of the Liberal Democrat group, left the party in March 2025 to become the council's first Reform UK councillor.
- Ashley Farrall, elected as a Labour councillor for Macclesfield Central, was suspended from the Labour group after being charged with a criminal offence and sat as a non-grouped independent from late 2024.
- Becky Posnett, elected as a Conservative councillor for Bunbury and deputy whip of the Conservative group, was sacked as deputy whip and quit the group in October 2025 after voting in favour of a Cheshire and Warrington devolution deal against the party whip.
- Allen Gage, elected as a Conservative councillor for Willaston and Rope, resigned his party membership "on a point of personal principle" in March 2026 to sit as a non-grouped independent.
- Kate Hague, elected as a Conservative councillor for High Legh, left the party in April 2026 to sit as a non-grouped independent.

=== By-elections ===
==== Crewe Central ====
The Crewe Central by-election was triggered by the resignation of Labour councillor Anthony Critchley in November 2023.

Crewe Central by-election: 8 February 2024
Party	Candidate	Votes	%	±%
Conservative	Roger Morris	335	43.3	+19.9
Labour	Kim Jamson	277	35.8	–18.9
Putting Crewe First	Brian Silvester	128	16.5	+1.1
Women's Equality	Vicky Pulman	22	2.8	N/A
Green	Te Ata Browne	12	1.5	N/A
Majority		58	7.5	
Turnout		774	16.5	
Conservative gain from Labour				

==== Crewe West ====
The Crewe West by-election was triggered by the resignation of Labour councillor Connor Naismith, who had been elected Member of Parliament for Crewe and Nantwich at the 2024 United Kingdom general election, held on 4 July 2024.

Crewe West by-election: 5 September 2024
Party	Candidate	Votes	%	±%
Labour	Ben Wye	553	44.0	–12.6
Reform	Nick Goulding	333	26.5	N/A
Conservative	David Simcox	217	17.3	+0.1
Putting Crewe First	Brian Silvester	109	8.7	–11.1
Green	Melanie English	63	5.0	N/A
Majority		220	17.5	
Turnout		1,275	16.8	
Labour hold				

==== Wilmslow Lacey Green ====
The Wilmslow Lacey Green by-election was triggered by the sudden death of Residents of Wilmslow councillor Chris Hilliard in June 2025.

Wilmslow Lacey Green by-election: 11 September 2025
Party	Candidate	Votes	%	±%
Conservative	Khumi Burton	370	29.8	–8.4
Labour	Steve Greaney	300	24.2	N/A
Reform	Nick Goulding	288	23.2	N/A
Residents	Elaine Evans	215	17.3	–30.3
Green	Amanda Iremonger	67	5.4	N/A
Majority		70	5.6	
Turnout		1,240	30.5	
Conservative gain from Residents				

==== Macclesfield Central ====
The Macclesfield Central by-election was triggered by the resignation of independent councillor Ashley Farrall on 26 September 2025, three days before he was sentenced to 12 months in prison for attempting to pervert the course of justice, in a matter unrelated to the council; Farrall had been elected as a Labour councillor but had sat as a non-grouped independent since being suspended by the party.

Macclesfield Central by-election: 20 November 2025
Party	Candidate	Votes	%	±%
Green	John Knight	750	41.8	+19.7
Labour	James Barber-Chadwick	513	28.6	–25.6
Reform	Alan Miles	283	15.8	N/A
Conservative	Beverley Dooley	164	9.1	–4.6
Equality Party	Kim Slater	45	2.5	N/A
Liberal Democrats	Stephen Broadhead	40	2.2	–7.8
Majority		237	13.2	
Turnout		1,795	24.2	
Green gain from Labour				

== Notes ==
- Italics denote a sitting councillor for the same ward.
