= 2011 Cheshire East Council election =

English local election

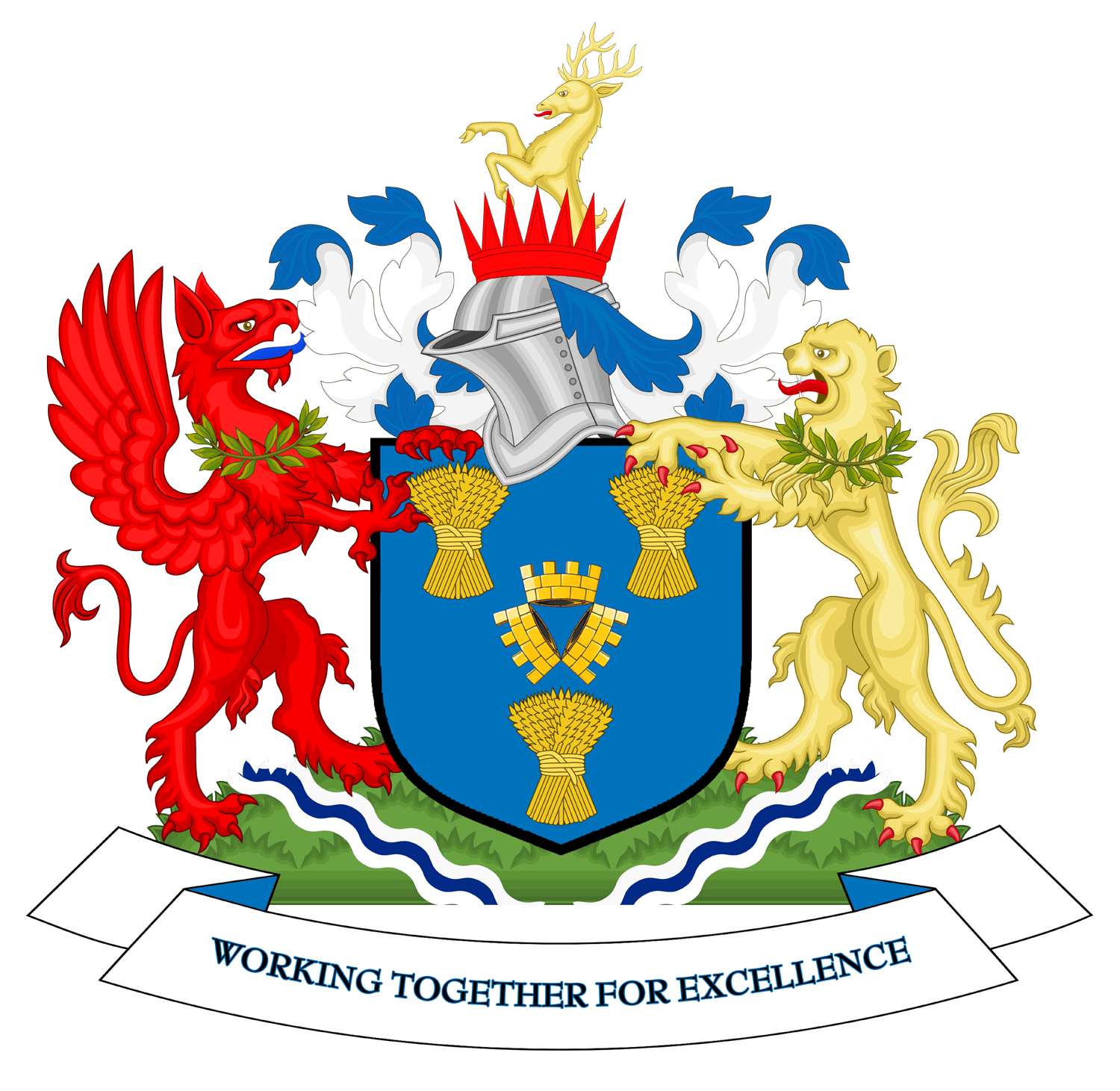
← 2008	5 May 2011	2015 →

All 82 seats in Cheshire East Council 42 seats needed for a majority
	First party	Second party	Third party
Party	Conservative	Labour	Liberal Democrats
Seats before	59	6	12
Seats won	52	16	4
Seat change	▼7	▲10	▼8
Popular vote	91,736	51,167	24,206
	Fourth party
Party	Middlewich First
- Map of the results of the 2011 Cheshire East council election. Conservatives in blue, Labour in red, Handforth Ratepayers Association, Middlewich First and Shavington First in white, Liberal Democrats in yellow and independents in grey.
Elected Council Leader
TBD

Elections to Cheshire East Council happened on Thursday 5 May 2011. Elections occurred in all 52 wards, with each ward returning between one and three councillors to the council.

The wards were all new, having been created in a boundary review which took effect in January 2011. They replaced the previous 27 three-seat wards used in the 2008 election, which were identical to the former Cheshire County Council wards.

== Overall results ==
The Conservative Party retained overall control of the council, winning 52 out of 82 seats, with a majority of 22 councillors.

After the election, the composition of the council was:

- Conservative 52
- Labour 16
- Others 10
- Liberal Democrat 4

Cheshire East Council election - 2011 - summary
Party	Seats	Gains	Losses	Net gain/loss	Seats %	Votes %	Votes	+/−
Conservative	52			−7		47.75	91,736	−6.4
Labour	16			+10		26.6	51,167	+12.7
Liberal Democrats	4			−8		12.6	24,206	−8.9
Middlewich First	3					2.4	4,578	
Handforth 'Ratepayers' Association	2					1.6	3,010	
Shavington First	1					0.3	608	
Others	4			+6		8.7	16,804	

== Ward results ==
An asterisk (*) denotes an incumbent councillor.

=== Alderley Edge ===
Alderley Edge (1 seat)
Party	Candidate	Votes	%	±%
Conservative	Frank Keegan*	1,151	72.53	
Labour	Dominic James Brown	436	27.47	
Majority		715	45.1	
Turnout		1,587	43.4	
Registered electors		3,785		
Conservative win				

Councillor Keegan previously served as a member for the now dissolved Alderley ward.

=== Alsager ===
Alsager (3 seats)
Party	Candidate	Votes	%	±%
Liberal Democrats	Rod Fletcher*	1,895	16.63	
Liberal Democrats	Derek Ian Hough*	1,760	15.44	
Liberal Democrats	Shirley Jones*	1,648	14.46	
Conservative	Andrew William Large	1,193	10.47	
Conservative	Harriet Emily Weatherby Crompton	1,164	10.21	
Labour	Bill Howell	947	8.31	
Conservative	Richard Peers	822	7.21	
Labour	Bob Ashley	805	7.06	
Labour	Simon Henley Norman Bishop	725	6.36	
Green	Hilary Robinson	439	3.85	
Majority		455	3.99	
Total votes		11,398		
Turnout			45.2 (Note: This is the turnout given by Cheshire East Council. Rallings and Thrasher give the turnout as 44.1%.)	
Registered electors		9,620		
Liberal Democrats win				
Liberal Democrats win				
Liberal Democrats win				

=== Audlem ===
Audlem (1 seat)
Party	Candidate	Votes	%	±%
Conservative	Rachel Anne Bailey	1,451	79.86	
Labour	Louise Mary Taylor	366	20.14	
Majority		1,085	59.72	
Turnout		1,817	48.8 (Note: This is the turnout given by Cheshire East Council. Rallings and Thrasher give the turnout as 48.7%.)	
Registered electors		3,848		
Conservative win				

Councillor Bailey previously served as a member for the now dissolved Cholmondeley ward.

=== Bollington ===
Bollington (2 seats)
Party	Candidate	Votes	%	±%
Conservative	William Harold Livesley*	814	13.59	
Conservative	Peter Hayes	813	13.57	
Bollington First	Amanda Stott	788	13.16	
Labour	Heidi Reid	778	12.99	
Bollington First	James Nicholas	758	12.66	
Labour	Malcolm Bailey	714	11.92	
Independent	Tony Mills	575	9.60	
Liberal Democrats	Shirley Sockett	436	7.28	
Liberal Democrats	Simon Christopher Owen	313	5.23	
Majority		25	0.42	
Total votes		5,989		
Turnout			48.3	
Registered electors		6,773		
Conservative win				
Conservative win				

Councillor Livesley previously served as a councillor for the now dissolved Prestbury and Tytherington ward.

=== Brereton Rural ===
Brereton Rural
Party	Candidate	Votes	%	±%
Conservative	John Valentine Frank Wray	Unopposed		
Registered electors		3,883		

=== Broken Cross and Upton ===
Broken Cross and Upton (2 seats)
Party	Candidate	Votes	%	±%
Conservative	Louise Brown	1,202	24.88	
Conservative	Martin Christopher Hardy	1,060	21.94	
Liberal Democrats	Ainsley Arnold	860	17.80	
Liberal Democrats	John Narraway	660	13.66	
Labour	Susan Jennifer Dale	537	11.12	
Labour	David Russell Vaughan Pemberton	512	10.60	
Majority		200	4.14	
Total votes		4,381		
Turnout			40.3	
Registered electors		6,692		
Conservative win				
Conservative win				

=== Bunbury ===
Bunbury (1 seat)
Party	Candidate	Votes	%	±%
Conservative	Michael Edward Jones	1,173	70.96	
Labour	Constance Jones	480	29.04	
Majority		693	41.92	
Turnout		1,653	46.9	
Registered electors		3,657		
Conservative win				

=== Chelford ===
Chelford (1 seat)
Party	Candidate	Votes	%	±%
Conservative	George Mitchell Walton	1,354	79.60	
Independent	Lozzer Hobday	347	20.40	
Majority		1007	59.20	
Turnout		1,701	52.7	
Registered electors		3,314		
Conservative win				

=== Congleton East ===
Congleton East (3 seats)
Party	Candidate	Votes	%	±%
Conservative	David Brown	2,139	19.26	
Conservative	Peter Herbert Mason	1,982	17.85	
Conservative	Andrew Roderick Thwaite	1,849	16.65	
Labour	Ernest Arther Clarke	1,268	11.42	
Labour	Robert Boston	1,190	10.71	
Labour	David Charles Burt	1,087	9.79	
Independent Voice of Congleton	Iain Grant McKinlay	959	8.63	
Liberal Democrats	Alan Wilson	632	5.69	
Majority		581	5.23	
Total votes		11,106		
Turnout			40.8	
Registered electors		10,738		
Conservative win				
Conservative win				
Conservative win				

=== Congleton West ===
Congleton West (3 seats)
Party	Candidate	Votes	%	±%
Conservative	Gordon Baxendale	1,621	14.57	
Conservative	David Topping	1,356	12.18	
Conservative	Roland Michael Domleo	1,345	12.09	
Labour	Lisa Bossons	997	8.96	
Independent Voice of Congleton	Michael John Hutton	918	8.25	
UKIP	Louise Bours	861	7.74	
Labour	Andrew Peter Thomas	805	7.23	
Liberal Democrats	Denis Murphy	789	7.09	
Independent Voice of Congleton	Neville Thomas Price	777	6.98	
Independent Voice of Congleton	Paul David Bates	584	5.25	
Liberal Democrats	Peter John Hirst	553	4.97	
Liberal Democrats	Eleanor Charlotte Anne Hall	523	4.70	
Majority		348	3.13	
Total votes		11,129		
Turnout			40.6	
Registered electors		10,769		
Conservative win				
Conservative win				
Conservative win				

=== Crewe Central ===
Crewe Central (1 seat)
Party	Candidate	Votes	%	±%
Labour	Irene Faseyi	525	60.34	
Liberal Democrats	Gwyn Griffiths	226	25.98	
Conservative	Cath Murphy	119	13.68	
Majority		299	34.37	
Turnout		870	24.0	
Registered electors		3,670		
Labour win				

=== Crewe East ===
Crewe East (3 seats)
Party	Candidate	Votes	%	±%
Labour	Peggy Martin	2,128	23.45	
Labour	Chris Thorley	2,058	22.68	
Labour	David John Newton	1,730	19.07	
Conservative	Katherine Mary Jones	975	10.75	
Conservative	Thomas Edwin Ankers	937	10.33	
Conservative	Stephen Mark Turnbull	902	9.94	
Liberal Democrats	Paul William Boniface	343	3.78	
Majority		755		
Total votes		9,073		
Turnout			34.8	
Registered electors		10,800		
Labour win				
Labour win				
Labour win				

=== Crewe North ===
Crewe North (1 seat)
Party	Candidate	Votes	%	±%
Labour	Mo Grant	758	61.03	
Conservative	John Anthony Jones	484	38.97	
Majority		274	22.06	
Turnout		1,242	35.6 (Note: This is the turnout given by Cheshire East Council. Rallings and Thrasher give the turnout as 35.7%.)	
Registered electors		3,581		
Labour win				

=== Crewe South ===
Crewe South (2 seats)
Party	Candidate	Votes	%	±%
Labour	Dorothy Hilda Flude	970	30.72	
Labour	Steven William Hogben	899	28.47	
Conservative	Jubeyar Ahmed	507	19.07	
Conservative	Steve Turnbull	489	10.75	
Liberal Democrats	Lisa Ellen Smith	147	4.65	
Liberal Democrats	Robert John Icke	146	4.62	
Majority		392		
Total votes		3,158		
Turnout			22.1	
Registered electors		7,798		
Labour win				
Labour win				

=== Crewe St Barnabas ===
Crewe St Barnabas (1 seat)
Party	Candidate	Votes	%	±%
Labour	Roy Cartlidge	650	76.83	
Conservative	Debbie Le Goff	196	23.17	
Majority		454	53.66	
Turnout		846	22.8	
Registered electors		3,779		
Labour win				

=== Crewe West ===
Crewe West (2 seats)
Party	Candidate	Votes	%	±%
Labour	Michelle Mary Sherratt	1,252	29.78	
Labour	Peter Nurse	1,182	28.12	
Conservative	Jubeyar Ahmed	561	13.34	
Conservative	Robert Andrew Johnson	527	12.54	
Liberal Democrats	David John Cannon	402	9.56	
Liberal Democrats	Robert John Icke	280	6.66	
Majority		621	14.77	
Total votes		4,204		
Turnout			31.7	
Registered electors		7,774		
Labour win				
Labour win				

=== Dane Valley ===
Dane Valley (2 seats)
Party	Candidate	Votes	%	±%
Conservative	Andrew Michael James Kolker	2,149	32.78	
Conservative	Les Gilbert	2,049	31.25	
Liberal Democrats	Nick Guthrie	916	13.97	
Labour	Margaret Ranger	636	9.70	
Labour	Steve Ranger	498	7.60	
UKIP	Lee William Slaughter	308	4.70	
Majority		1,133	17.28	
Total votes		6,556		
Turnout			51.8	
Registered electors		7,601		
Conservative win				
Conservative win				

=== Disley ===
Disley (1 seat)
Party	Candidate	Votes	%	±%
Conservative	Harold Davenport	974	55.94	
Labour	Gordon Sutton	440	25.27	
Liberal Democrats	Tony Berry	327	18.78	
Majority		534	30.67	
Turnout		1,741	48.9	
Registered electors		3,676		
Conservative win				

=== Gawsworth ===
Gawsworth
Party	Candidate	Votes	%	±%
Conservative	Lesley Smetham	Unopposed		
Registered electors		3,199		

=== Handforth ===
Handforth (2 seats)
Party	Candidate	Votes	%	±%
Ratepayers	Barry Edward Burkhill	1,658	31.73	
Ratepayers	Dennis Mahon	1,352	25.88	
Conservative	Adrian Henry Bradley	944	18.07	
Conservative	Matthew Dominic Lloyd	677	12.96	
Labour	Patricia Bernadette Page	594	11.37	
Majority		408	7.81	
Total votes		5,225		
Turnout			42.0	
Registered electors		7,162		
Ratepayers win				
Ratepayers win				

=== Haslington ===
Haslington (2 seats)
Party	Candidate	Votes	%	±%
Conservative	John Hammond	1,800	33.63	
Conservative	David Frank Marren	1,406	26.27	
Labour	Phillip Robert Buckley	970	18.12	
Labour	David Holmes	922	17.22	
Liberal Democrats	Nicholas James Taylor	255	4.76	
Majority		436	8.14	
Total votes		5,353		
Turnout			45.5	
Registered electors		6,750		
Conservative win				
Conservative win				

=== High Legh ===
High Legh
Party	Candidate	Votes	%	±%
Conservative	Steve Wilkinson	Unopposed		
Registered electors		3,564		

=== Knutsford ===
Knutsford (3 seats)
Party	Candidate	Votes	%	±%
Conservative	Olivia Hunter	2,805	22.17	
Conservative	Stewart Anthony Gardiner	2,750	21.73	
Conservative	Peter Stephen Raynes	2,537	20.05	
Liberal Democrats	Barbara Susan Austin	1,426	11.27	
Labour	Paul Aubrey Urquhart Thomson	1,147	9.06	
Liberal Democrats	Caroline Susan Aldhouse	1,054	8.33	
Liberal Democrats	Francis George Boden Aldhouse	935	7.39	
Majority		1,111	8.78	
Total votes		12,654		
Turnout			47.9	
Registered electors		10,449		
Conservative win				
Conservative win				
Conservative win				

=== Leighton ===
Leighton (1 seat)
Party	Candidate	Votes	%	±%
Conservative	Derek Nicholas Bebbington	563	40.01	
Labour	Terry Beard	428	30.42	
Independent	Byron Evans	416	29.57	
Majority		135	9.59	
Turnout		1,407	35.1	
Registered electors		4,124		
Conservative win				

=== Macclesfield Central ===
Macclesfield Central (2 seats)
Party	Candidate	Votes	%	±%
Labour	Janet Anne Jackson	998	24.60	
Labour	Ken Edwards	835	20.58	
Conservative	Tony Ranfield	582	14.35	
Conservative	Malcolm Thomas	526	12.97	
Green	David Gooda	432	10.65	
Liberal Democrats	Charlotte Eve Bird	364	8.97	
Green	John Anthony Knight	320	7.89	
Majority		253	6.24	
Total votes		4,057		
Turnout			34.2	
Registered electors		6,636		
Labour win				
Labour win				

=== Macclesfield East ===
Macclesfield East (1 seat)
Party	Candidate	Votes	%	±%
Liberal Democrats	David Allan Neilson	576	42.99	
Conservative	Diana Margaret Millett	332	24.78	
Labour	David Michael Reed	321	23.96	
Green	Mark Theodore Noble	111	8.28	
Majority		244	18.21	
Turnout		1,340	39.2	
Registered electors		3,475		
Liberal Democrats win				

=== Macclesfield Hurdsfield ===
Macclesfield Hurdsfield (1 seat)
Party	Candidate	Votes	%	±%
Labour	Gill Boston	526	46.63	
Liberal Democrats	Christine Tomlinson	302	26.77	
Conservative	Alastair Crawford Kennedy	300	26.60	
Majority		224	19.86	
Turnout		1,128	32.6	
Registered electors		4,124		
Labour win				

=== Macclesfield South ===
Macclesfield South (2 seats)
Party	Candidate	Votes	%	±%
Labour	Laura Jeuda	1,006	25.63	
Conservative	Damien Druce	1,002	25.53	
Conservative	Tom Haslehurst	971	24.74	
Labour	Nell Carter	946	24.10	
Majority		31	0.79	
Total votes		3,925		
Turnout			34.7	
Registered electors		6,523		
Labour win				
Conservative win				

=== Macclesfield Tytherington ===
Macclesfield Tytherington (2 seats)
Party	Candidate	Votes	%	±%
Independent	Brendan Murphy	1,516	25.79	
Independent	Lloyd Roberts	1,246	21.19	
Conservative	Carol Ann Ward	1,032	17.55	
Conservative	Marian Annette Hardy	991	16.86	
Labour	Mark Stedman	499	8.49	
Labour	Mildred Wray	348	5.92	
Green	Walter John Houston	247	4.20	
Majority		214	3.64	
Total votes		5,879		
Turnout			47.0	
Registered electors		7,167		
Independent win				
Independent win				

=== Macclesfield West and Ivy ===
Macclesfield West and Ivy (2 seats)
Party	Candidate	Votes	%	±%
Labour	Alift Iris Eugenie Harewood	1,027	25.02	
Conservative	Carolyn Margaret Andrew	1,002	24.41	
Conservative	Andrew James Knowles	918	22.36	
Labour	Brian Mark Puddicombe	833	20.29	
Green	Dougal Julian Hare	325	7.92	
Majority		84	2.05	
Total votes		4,105		
Turnout			37.6	
Registered electors		6,451		
Labour win				
Conservative win				

=== Middlewich ===
Middlewich (3 seats)
Party	Candidate	Votes	%	±%
Middlewich First	Paul John Edwards	1,638	16.35	
Middlewich First	Michael John Parsons	1,550	15.47	
Middlewich First	Simon Nicholas McGrory	1,390	13.87	
Conservative	Craig Daniel Evans	1,037	10.35	
Labour	Allan William James Croll	837	8.35	
Labour	David John Bryant	781	7.79	
Labour	Stephen Mitchell	761	7.59	
Conservative	Peter Leigh Kolker	697	6.96	
Conservative	Elaine Wray	675	6.74	
Liberal Democrats	Keith Norman Bagnall	357	3.56	
Liberal Democrats	Donna Julie Caffyn	298	2.97	
Majority		353	3.52	
Total votes		10,021		
Turnout			36.3	
Registered electors		10,590		
Middlewich First win				
Middlewich First win				
Middlewich First win				

=== Mobberley ===
Mobberley
Party	Candidate	Votes	%	±%
Conservative	Jamie McCray	Unopposed		
Registered electors		3,705		

=== Nantwich North and West ===
Nantwich North and West (2 seats)
Party	Candidate	Votes	%	±%
Independent	Arthur Moran	1,353	23.26	
Independent	Penny Butterill	1,064	18.29	
Conservative	Brian Herbert Dykes	920	15.82	
Conservative	Steven John Edgar	888	15.27	
Labour	John Richard Priest	836	14.37	
Labour	Trevor Michael Rowland	756	13.00	
Majority		144	2.48	
Total votes		5,817		
Turnout			43.9	
Registered electors		7,188		
Independent win				
Independent win				

=== Nantwich South and Stapeley ===
Nantwich South and Stapeley (2 seats)
Party	Candidate	Votes	%	±%
Conservative	Andrew Edwin Martin	1,680	30.89	
Conservative	Peter Graham Groves	1,291	23.74	
Labour	Rachel Shenton	892	16.40	
Labour	Chris Cull	614	11.29	
Independent	Alan Ross Williams	602	11.07	
Independent	Teresa Maureen Eatough	359	6.60	
Majority		399	7.34	
Total votes		5,438		
Turnout			45.5	
Registered electors		6,626		
Conservative win				
Conservative win				

=== Odd Rode ===
Odd Rode (2 seats)
Party	Candidate	Votes	%	±%
Conservative	Rhoda Bailey	1,652	35.21	
Conservative	Andrew John Barratt	1,267	27.00	
Liberal Democrats	Robert Philip Hemsley	897	19.12	
Liberal Democrats	Ray Lowe	876	18.67	
Majority		370	7.89	
Total votes		4,692		
Turnout			41.2	
Registered electors		7,059		
Conservative win				
Conservative win				

=== Poynton East and Pott Shrigley ===
Poynton East and Pott Shrigley (2 seats)
Party	Candidate	Votes	%	±%
Conservative	Howard Murray	1,898	33.52	
Conservative	Jos Saunders	1,822	32.18	
Liberal Democrats	Christopher James Robinson	669	11.82	
Labour	Judith Elderkin	666	11.76	
Labour	Andrew Jonathan Moffatt	607	10.72	
Majority		1,153	20.36	
Total votes		5,662		
Turnout			49.8	
Registered electors		6,439		
Conservative win				
Conservative win				

=== Poynton West and Adlington ===
Poynton West and Adlington (2 seats)
Party	Candidate	Votes	%	±%
Conservative	Philip William George Hoyland	1,856	33.50	
Conservative	Roger Edward West	1,742	31.44	
Labour	Elizabeth Middleton	744	13.43	
Labour	Jamie Cassar	694	12.52	
Green	Andrew Gordon Hall	505	9.11	
Majority		988	17.83	
Total votes		5,541		
Turnout			45.4	
Registered electors		7,031		
Conservative win				
Conservative win				

=== Prestbury ===
Prestbury (1 seat)
Party	Candidate	Votes	%	±%
Conservative	Paul John Findlow	1,621	87.06	
Labour	Sandra Frances Edwards	241	12.94	
Majority		1,380	74.11	
Turnout		1,862	52.9	
Registered electors		3,632		
Conservative win				
