= 2019 Cheshire East Council election =

2019 UK local government election

- 2 May 2019

All 82 seats to Cheshire East Council 42 seats needed for a majority

	First party	Second party	Third party
Party	Conservative	Labour	Independent
Last election	51 seats, 45.0%	16 seats, 23.8%	1 seat, 2.8%
Seats won	34	25	11
Seat change	▼17	▲9	▲10
Popular vote	60,839	47,807	18,951
Percentage	35.5%	27.9%	11.1%
Swing	▼9.5%	▲4.1%	▲8.3%
	Fourth party	Fifth party
Party	Liberal Democrats	Residents
Last election	2 seats, 5.8%	1 seat, 0.7%
Seats won	4	4
Seat change	▲2	▲3
Popular vote	18,876	5,34
Percentage	11.0%	3.1%
Swing	▲5.2%	▲2.4%
- Winner of each seat at the 2019 Cheshire East Council election
Leader of the council before election
Rachel Bailey
Conservative
Leader of the council after election
Sam Corcoran
Labour

Elections to Cheshire East Council took place on Thursday 2 May 2019 in all 52 wards, with each ward returning between one and three councillors to the council. The Conservative Party lost overall control of the council, losing 17 seats; the Labour Party gained 9 seats, independents gained 6 and the Liberal Democrats gained 2.

The elections were held against a background of a number of controversies, with the council facing eight criminal investigations. Multiple Conservative Cabinet members lost their seats, with Ainsley Arnold (Planning) losing out to Independents in Macclesfield Tytherington and Paul Bates (Finance) falling to fifth place in Congleton East, whilst then-Leader of the Council Rachel Bailey came within 78 votes of losing her seat to the Liberal Democrats. The biggest shocks came in Broken Cross and Upton, with Labour's Rob Vernon and James Barber becoming the first ever Labour councillors for the area and unseating the Mayor-elect, Liz Durham, and Sandbach Ettiley Heath and Wheelock, where Laura Crane achieved a huge swing to win the seat for Labour against Conservative councillor Gail Wait.

No party or group held a majority of the council seats, and so, after a few weeks of negotiation, Labour and the Independents agreed to form a joint-Cabinet that would run the council for the following year. The focus was on changing the system of governance to abolish the Cabinet and replace it with the old committee system.

== Summary ==
=== Election result ===
2019 Cheshire East Council election
Party	Candidates	Seats	Gains	Losses	Net gain/loss	Seats %	Votes %	Votes	+/−
Conservative	81	34	0	17	▼17	41.5	35.5	60,839	–9.5
Labour	65	25	9	0	▲9	30.5	27.9	47,807	+4.1
Independent	25	11	7	0	▲10	13.4	11.1	18,951	+8.3
Liberal Democrats	33	4	2	0	▲2	4.9	11.0	18,876	+5.2
Residents	4	4	3	0	▲3	4.9	3.1	5,234	+2.4
Bollington First	1	2	0	0	▲1	2.4	1.6	2,757	+0.6
Alderley Edge First	1	1	0	0	Steady	1.2	0.7	1,219	+0.2
Handforth Ratepayers	2	1	0	1	▼1	1.2	1.2	2,004	±0.0
Green	20	0	0	0	Steady	0.0	5.5	9,370	+1.2
Women's Equality	1	0	0	0	Steady	0.0	0.5	826	N/A
Middlewich First	3	0	0	3	▼3	0.0	1.1	1,961	–0.8
Animal Welfare	1	0	0	0	Steady	0.0	0.3	536	N/A
UKIP	2	0	0	0	Steady	0.0	0.3	502	–9.8
For Britain	2	0	0	0	Steady	0.0	0.2	402	N/A

== Results by ward ==
=== Alderley Edge ===
Alderley Edge (1 seat)
Party	Candidate	Votes	%
Alderley Edge First	Craig Julian Browne	1,219	76.86
Conservative	Paul Nicholas Brearley	255	16.08
Green	Keith Andrew Boxer	112	7.06
Turnout			42.79
Alderley Edge First hold			

=== Alsager ===
Alsager (3 seats)
Party	Candidate	Votes	%
Liberal Democrats	Rod Fletcher	1,457	37.30
Liberal Democrats	June Elizabeth Buckley	1,340	34.31
Liberal Democrats	Phil Williams	1,297	33.21
Labour	Jo Dale	1,082	27.70
Conservative	Sue Helliwell	1,026	26.27
Conservative	Martin William Deakin	920	23.55
Labour	Julia Hawkins	919	23.53
Labour	Michael James Unett	871	22.30
Conservative	Paul Hugh Redstone	799	20.46
Green	Hilary Jean Robinson	547	14.00
Animal Welfare Party	Jane Catherine Smith	536	13.72
Turnout			40.69
Liberal Democrats hold			
Liberal Democrats hold			
Liberal Democrats gain from Conservative			

=== Audlem ===
Audlem (1 seat)
Party	Candidate	Votes	%
Conservative	Rachel Anne Bailey	746	52.76
Liberal Democrats	Richard John Derricutt	668	47.24
Turnout			36.03
Conservative hold			

=== Bollington ===
Bollington (2 seats)
Party	Candidate	Votes	%
Bollington First	Amanda Stott	1,447	52.01
Bollington First	James William David Nicholas	1,310	47.09
Labour	John William Place	705	25.34
Labour	Mike Hutchison	635	22.83
Conservative	Elaine Mary Houghton	481	17.29
Liberal Democrats	Johanna Maitland	309	11.11
Conservative	Christopher Paul O'Leary	279	10.03
Turnout			40.11
Bollington First hold			
Bollington First hold			

=== Brereton Rural ===
Brereton Rural (1 seat)
Party	Candidate	Votes	%
Conservative	John Valentine Wray	850	52.24
Independent	Mark Cameron Elves	474	29.13
Labour	Geraint Huw Price Jones	303	18.62
Turnout			34.95
Conservative hold			

=== Broken Cross and Upton ===
Broken Cross and Upton (2 seats)
Party	Candidate	Votes	%
Labour	Rob Vernon	948	38.23
Labour	James William Barber	889	35.85
Conservative	Liz Durham	764	30.81
Conservative	Gareth Jones	653	26.33
Green	David John Mayers	406	16.37
Liberal Democrats	Max Muncaster	392	15.81
Independent	Martin Christopher Hardy	317	12.78
UKIP	Maddie Mitchell	195	7.86
Turnout			36.6
Labour gain from Conservative			
Labour gain from Conservative			

=== Bunbury ===
Bunbury (1 seat)
Party	Candidate	Votes	%
Conservative	Sarah Joanne Pochin	750	54.47
Liberal Democrats	Mark Peregrine Ireland-Jones	627	45.53
Turnout			37.51
Conservative hold			

=== Chelford ===
Chelford (1 seat)
Party	Candidate	Votes	%
Conservative	Marc Nigel Asquith	646	51.75
Liberal Democrats	Heulwen Ann Barlow	330	26.48
Independent	Laurence Michael Hobday	270	21.67
Turnout			36.21
Conservative hold			

=== Congleton East ===
Congleton East (3 seats)
Party	Candidate	Votes	%
Liberal Democrats	Denis Murphy	1,041	27.66
Independent	Rob Moreton	1,040	27.64
Conservative	David Thomas Brown	1,028	27.32
Independent	Anthony Philip Bolding	989	26.28
Conservative	Paul David Bates	950	25.25
Conservative	Glen Samuel Williams	894	23.76
Women's Equality	Kay Wesley	826	21.95
Liberal Democrats	Robert Julian Douglas	765	20.33
Liberal Democrats	James Nicholas Andrew Smith	740	19.67
Independent	Simon Peter Clodd-Broom	699	18.58
Labour	Peter John Ranson	649	17.25
Labour	Ethel Mary Ranson	635	16.87
Turnout			34.78
Liberal Democrats gain from Conservative			
Independent gain from Conservative			
Conservative hold			

=== Congleton West ===
Congleton West (3 seats)
Party	Candidate	Votes	%
Independent	Suzie Akers Smith	1,195	34.03
Conservative	George Patrick Hayes	1,059	30.15
Conservative	Sally Ann Holland	1,009	28.73
Conservative	Geoff Baggott	960	27.33
Liberal Democrats	Suzy Firkin	933	26.57
Labour	Heather Seddon	700	19.93
Labour	Alfie Seddon	685	19.50
Liberal Democrats	Paul Michael Duffy	665	18.94
Liberal Democrats	Robert Philip Hemsley	660	18.79
Independent	Adam Clive Scott	649	18.48
Independent	Sharon Smith	636	18.11
Labour	Irene Faseyi	567	16.14
Turnout			32.52
Independent gain from Conservative			
Conservative hold			
Conservative hold			

=== Crewe Central ===
Crewe Central (1 seat)
Party	Candidate	Votes	%
Labour	Anthony Jack Critchley	450	60.98
Conservative	Jonathan Ford Bebbington	139	18.83
Liberal Democrats	Gwyn Griffiths	94	12.74
Independent	Adam Ali Mustafa	55	7.45
Turnout			17.52
Labour hold			

=== Crewe East ===
Crewe East (3 seats)
Party	Candidate	Votes	%
Labour	Joy Bratherton	1,353	52.46
Labour	Suzanne Marie Brookfield	1,340	51.96
Labour	Hazel Faddes	1,239	48.04
Independent	James Albert Conner	610	23.65
Conservative	Peter Hargreaves	569	22.06
Conservative	Clive Dunning Elverstone	521	20.20
Conservative	Dominic John Bernard Wyartt	483	18.73
Green	Melanie Ruth English	478	18.53
Turnout			23.69
Labour hold			
Labour hold			
Labour hold			

=== Crewe North ===
Crewe North (1 seat)
Party	Candidate	Votes	%
Labour	Jill Rhodes	471	48.71
For Britain	Brian George Silvester	297	30.71
Conservative	Ryan Joseph Moore	199	20.58
Turnout			26.90
Labour hold			

=== Crewe South ===
Crewe South (2 seats)
Party	Candidate	Votes	%
Labour	Dorothy Hilda Flude	1,138	59.39
Labour	Steven William Hogben	1,052	54.91
Conservative	Nicola Cooper	471	24.58
Conservative	Arnob Ahmed	466	24.32
Liberal Democrats	James Clifford Hughes	240	12.53
Turnout			24.95
Labour hold			
Labour hold			

=== Crewe St. Barnabas ===
Crewe St. Barnabas (1 seat)
Party	Candidate	Votes	%
Labour	Sally Elizabeth Handley	426	74.48
Conservative	Cherene Chantel Kefira Bracegirdle-Smith	146	25.52
Turnout			15.95
Labour hold			

=== Crewe West ===
Crewe West (2 seats)
Party	Candidate	Votes	%
Labour	Brian Roberts	1,013	58.18
Labour	Marilyn Houston	940	53.99
Independent	Roy Cartlidge	434	24.93
Conservative	Patrick James Timms	409	23.49
Conservative	Martin Clynes	344	19.76
Turnout			22.97
Labour hold			
Labour hold			

=== Dane Valley ===
Dane Valley (2 seats)
Party	Candidate	Votes	%
Conservative	Les Gilbert	1,583	52.40
Conservative	Andrew Michael James Kolker	1,539	50.94
Liberal Democrats	Richard James Wilson	936	30.98
Liberal Democrats	Michelle Boath	748	24.76
Green	Robert Michael St. John Green	402	13.31
Labour	Willow Dale	259	8.57
Labour	Pete Dale	230	7.61
Turnout			37.58
Conservative hold			
Conservative hold			

=== Disley ===
Disley (1 seat)
Party	Candidate	Votes	%
Independent	Brendan Patrick Murphy	762	49.16
Labour	Alison Smith	399	25.74
Conservative	Harold Davenport	389	25.10
Turnout			39.32
Independent gain from Conservative			

=== Gawsworth ===
Gawsworth (1 seat)
Party	Candidate	Votes	%
Conservative	Lesley Smetham	883	72.85
Labour	Fiona Wilson	329	27.15
Turnout			37.77
Conservative hold			

=== Handforth ===
Handforth (2 seats)
Party	Candidate	Votes	%
Independent	Julie Anne Smith	1,297	52.60
Handforth Ratepayers' Association (Independent)	Barry Edward Burkhill	1,086	44.04
Handforth Ratepayers' Association (Independent)	Susan Ann Elizabeth Bidwell	918	37.23
Conservative	David Lonsdale	595	24.13
Liberal Democrats	Chris Fortune	383	15.53
Turnout			33.67
Independent gain from Handforth Ratepayers' Association			
Handforth Ratepayers' Association hold			

=== Haslington ===
Haslington (2 seats)
Party	Candidate	Votes	%
Conservative	Steven John Edgar	1,061	44.15
Conservative	Mary Elizabeth Addison	1,058	44.03
Labour	Pete Gubbins	716	29.80
Green	Louise Amber Jewkes	696	28.96
Liberal Democrats	Nick Taylor	293	12.19
Green	Te Ata Browne	287	11.94
Turnout			35.03
Conservative hold			
Conservative hold			

=== High Legh ===
High Legh (1 seat)
Party	Candidate	Votes	%
Conservative	Kate Parkinson	710	53.71
Green	Nigel Robert Hennerley	612	46.29
Turnout			36.62
Conservative hold			

=== Knutsford ===
Knutsford (3 seats)
Party	Candidate	Votes	%
Conservative	Stewart Gardiner	1,310	38.83
Independent	Quentin Abel	1,290	38.23
Conservative	Tony Dean	1,243	36.84
Conservative	Peter David Coan	1,174	34.80
Green	Charlie William Abbott Booth	917	27.18
Liberal Democrats	Christopher Avery Wetherell	912	27.03
Labour	Joe Godden	848	25.13
Independent	Helen Ghislaine Rogers	830	24.60
Turnout			32.57
Conservative hold			
Independent gain from Conservative			
Conservative hold			

=== Leighton ===
Leighton (1 seat)
Party	Candidate	Votes	%
Independent	Byron Evans	608	44.74
Conservative	Sean Owen Alexander Houlston	425	31.27
Labour	Alison Joy Spicer	326	23.99
Turnout			31.48
Independent gain from Conservative			

=== Macclesfield Central ===
Macclesfield Central (2 seats)
Party	Candidate	Votes	%
Labour	Liz Braithwaite	1,027	42.83
Labour	Ashley Philip Kenneth Farrall	829	34.57
Green	John Anthony Knight	783	32.65
Green	Charlie Morgan Keller	594	24.77
Conservative	Beverley Anne Dooley	505	21.06
Conservative	David Philip Dooley	437	18.22
Independent	Nigel Manton	216	9.01
For Britain	Tony Myrie	105	4.38
Turnout			33.22
Labour hold			
Labour gain from Conservative			

=== Macclesfield East ===
Macclesfield East (1 seat)
Party	Candidate	Votes	%
Independent	Mick Warren	984	69.00
Labour	Jan Elizabeth Baddeley	205	14.38
Green	Lindy Brett	137	9.61
Conservative	John Le Moignan	100	7.01
Turnout			39.90
Independent hold			

=== Macclesfield Hurdsfield ===
Macclesfield Hurdsfield (1 seat)
Party	Candidate	Votes	%
Labour	Stephen Frank Carter	558	58.80
Conservative	Alastair Crawford Kennedy	206	21.71
Green	James Andrew Booth	185	19.49
Turnout			27.93
Labour hold			

=== Macclesfield South ===
Macclesfield South (2 seats)
Party	Candidate	Votes	%
Labour	Laura Jeuda	1,133	62.49
Labour	Brian Mark Puddicombe	1,049	57.86
Conservative	Philip Bolton	599	33.04
Conservative	John Christopher Waterhouse	528	29.12
Turnout			29.06
Labour hold			
Labour gain from Conservative			

=== Macclesfield Tytherington ===
Macclesfield Tytherington (2 seats)
Party	Candidate	Votes	%
Independent	David Edwardes	1,288	43.57
Independent	Lloyd Roberts	1,130	38.23
Conservative	Ainsley William Arnold	830	28.08
Conservative	Nick Taylor	742	25.10
Labour	Rebecca Ann Vernon	429	14.51
Green	Walter John Houston	394	13.33
Liberal Democrats	Ahmad Kamal Ibrahim Arafa	382	12.92
Labour	Victoria Amy Vernon	364	12.31
Turnout			40.57
Independent hold			
Independent gain from Conservative			

=== Macclesfield West and Ivy ===
Macclesfield West and Ivy (2 seats)
Party	Candidate	Votes	%
Labour	Nicholas Peter Mannion	1,070	56.26
Labour	Alift Iris Eugenie Harewood	950	49.95
Conservative	Adam Francis Schofield	608	31.97
Conservative	Abhishika Srivastav	387	20.35
UKIP	Joseph Nicholas Foster	307	16.14
Turnout			30.32
Labour hold			
Labour hold			

=== Middlewich ===
Middlewich (3 seats)
Party	Candidate	Votes	%
Labour	Mike Hunter	1,735	51.93
Labour	Jonathan Parry	1,730	51.78
Labour	Carol Bulman	1,687	50.49
Conservative	Alison Roylance-White	755	22.60
Conservative	Paul John Edwards	747	22.36
Middlewich First	Bernice Walmsley	704	21.07
Middlewich First	Simon Nicholas McGrory	674	20.17
Conservative	Bill McCracken	633	18.95
Middlewich First	William Walmsley	583	17.45
Turnout			29.94
Labour gain from Middlewich First			
Labour gain from Middlewich First			
Labour gain from Middlewich First			

=== Mobberley ===
This ward's single seat was uncontested.

Mobberley (1 seat)
Party	Candidate	Votes	%
Conservative	Charlotte Frances Leach	0	0.00
Turnout			0.00
Conservative hold			

=== Nantwich North and West ===
Nantwich North and West (2 seats)
Party	Candidate	Votes	%
Independent	Arthur Moran	1,345	51.32
Independent	Penny Butterill	1,188	45.33
Conservative	Vicky Higham	718	27.39
Conservative	John Patrick Statham	700	26.71
Labour	Joy O'Hara-Douglas	531	20.26
Labour	Jake Lomax	520	19.84
Turnout			36.97
Independent hold			
Independent hold			

=== Nantwich South and Stapeley ===
Nantwich South and Stapeley (2 seats)
Party	Candidate	Votes	%
Conservative	Andrew Edwin Martin	1,224	46.81
Conservative	Peter Graham Groves	1,106	42.29
Labour	Richard Alexander Banks	613	23.44
Labour	Sinead Vera Lois Wheeler	565	21.61
Liberal Democrats	Stephen Ford	520	19.89
Liberal Democrats	Matthew Cameron Theobald	516	19.73
Independent	Stuart Robert Bostock	426	16.29
Turnout			36.37
Conservative hold			
Conservative hold			

=== Odd Rode ===
Odd Rode (2 seats)
Party	Candidate	Votes	%
Conservative	Liz Wardlaw	934	45.94
Conservative	Patrick Hugh Redstone	804	39.55
Labour	Sam O'Bree	656	32.37
Labour	James Longshaw	644	31.68
Liberal Democrats	Ronald Tyson	496	24.40
Turnout			30.44
Conservative hold			
Conservative hold			

=== Poynton East and Pott Shrigley ===
Poynton East and Pott Shrigley (2 seats)
Party	Candidate	Votes	%
Conservative	Jos Saunders	1,417	57.53
Conservative	Nicky Wylie	1,395	56.64
Labour	Clayre Reid	693	28.14
Green	Renaud Claire	606	24.60
Labour	Robert William Sabin	522	21.19
Turnout			36.97
Conservative hold			
Conservative hold			

=== Poynton West and Adlington ===
Poynton West and Adlington (2 seats)
Party	Candidate	Votes	%
Conservative	Michael Beanland	1,277	51.51
Conservative	Mike Sewart	1,241	50.06
Green	Kathleen Marjorie Booth	602	24.28
Labour	Sarah Jill Marshall	583	23.52
Green	Andrew Gordon Hill	563	22.71
Labour	Ronald Geoffrey Thompson	489	19.73
Turnout			36.54
Conservative hold			
Conservative hold			

=== Prestbury ===
Prestbury (1 seat)
Party	Candidate	Votes	%
Conservative	John Paul Findlow	1,162	88.57
Labour	Ted Wall	150	11.43
Turnout			37.13
Conservative hold			

=== Sandbach Elworth ===
Sandbach Elworth (1 seat)
Party	Candidate	Votes	%
Labour	Kathryn Anne Flavell	808	56.70
Conservative	Gill Merry	617	43.30
Turnout			33.46
Labour gain from Conservative			

=== Sandbach Ettiley Heath and Wheelock ===
Sandbach Ettiley Heath and Wheelock (1 seat)
Party	Candidate	Votes	%
Labour	Laura Elisabeth Crane	665	53.54
Conservative	Gail Wait	577	46.46
Turnout			29.65
Labour gain from Conservative			

=== Sandbach Heath and East ===
Sandbach Heath and East (1 seat)
Party	Candidate	Votes	%
Labour	Sam Corcoran	754	60.71
Conservative	Mike Muldoon	370	29.79
Liberal Democrats	Pauline Marie Hubbard	118	9.50
Turnout			34.81
Labour hold			

=== Sandbach Town ===
Sandbach Town (1 seat)
Party	Candidate	Votes	%
Conservative	Mike Benson	914	59.86
Labour	Paula Eaton	613	40.14
Turnout			37.44
Conservative hold			

=== Shavington ===
Shavington (1 seat)
Party	Candidate	Votes	%
Conservative	David Frank Marren	586	48.79
Labour	Linda Jane Buchanan	508	42.30
Liberal Democrats	John Martin Phillips	107	8.91
Turnout			32.10
Conservative hold			

=== Sutton ===
Sutton (1 seat)
Party	Candidate	Votes	%
Conservative	Andrew Harry Gregory	687	47.12
Green	Karen Jane Downard	310	21.26
Labour	John Reece Evans	297	20.37
Liberal Democrats	Stephen Laurence Broadhead	164	11.25
Turnout			41.30
Conservative hold			

=== Willaston and Rope ===
Willaston and Rope (1 seat)
Party	Candidate	Votes	%
Conservative	Allen Gage	707	43.89
Labour	Ben Wye	536	33.27
Green	Richard John Bennett	248	15.39
Liberal Democrats	David Joseph Parkes	120	7.45
Turnout			41.14
Conservative hold			

=== Wilmslow Dean Row ===
Wilmslow Dean Row (1 seat)
Party	Candidate	Votes	%
Residents of Wilmslow	Toni Fox	930	69.45
Conservative	Frank McCarthy	409	30.55
Turnout			36.13
Residents of Wilmslow hold			

=== Wilmslow East ===
Wilmslow East (1 seat)
Party	Candidate	Votes	%
Residents of Wilmslow	David Jefferay	1,076	73.30
Conservative	Barry Estill	392	26.70
Turnout			45.50
Residents of Wilmslow gain from Conservative			

=== Wilmslow Lacey Green ===
Wilmslow Lacey Green (1 seat)
Party	Candidate	Votes	%
Conservative	Don Stockton	544	42.83
Labour	Ribia Nisa	408	32.13
Liberal Democrats	Damian Peter Carr	318	25.04
Turnout			36.10
Conservative hold			

=== Wilmslow West and Chorley ===
Wilmslow West and Chorley (2 seats)
Party	Candidate	Votes	%
Residents of Wilmslow	Mark Goldsmith	1,758	56.73
Residents of Wilmslow	Iain Macfarlane	1,470	47.43
Conservative	Gary Philip Barton	819	26.43
Conservative	Ellie Brooks	819	26.43
Liberal Democrats	Birgitta Hoffmann	532	17.17
Liberal Democrats	Oliver Jeremy Romain	445	14.36
Turnout			39.03
Residents of Wilmslow gain from Conservative			
Residents of Wilmslow gain from Conservative			

=== Wistaston ===
Wistaston (2 seats)
Party	Candidate	Votes	%
Conservative	Margaret Joan Simon	1,196	44.23
Conservative	Jacquie Weatherill	1,168	43.20
Labour	Vicky Smith	1,118	41.35
Labour	John Scott	975	36.06
Green	Kim Heyes	491	18.16
Turnout			36.33
Conservative hold			
Conservative hold			

=== Wrenbury ===
Wrenbury (1 seat)
Party	Candidate	Votes	%
Conservative	Stan Davies	926	62.86
Liberal Democrats	Paul James Weaver	328	22.27
Independent	David John Bell	219	14.87
Turnout			34.34
Conservative hold			

=== Wybunbury ===
Wybunbury (1 seat)
Party	Candidate	Votes	%
Conservative	Janet Christine Clowes	1,267	82.11
Labour	Joseph Andrew Cosby	276	17.89
Turnout			36.02
Conservative hold			

== Changes 2019–2023 ==
- Nicky Wylie, elected as a Conservative councillor for Poynton East and Pott Shrigley, left the Conservative group in January 2022 over the "Partygate" scandal, and sat as a non-grouped independent for the remainder of the term.
- Andrew Gregory, elected as a Conservative councillor for Sutton, resigned from the Conservative group in June 2022 and joined the Cheshire East Independent Group.
- Marc Asquith, Conservative councillor for Chelford, was suspended by his party pending an investigation in June 2021 after saying he would attend a full council meeting despite believing he had tested positive for COVID-19; it later emerged he had misread a negative test, and he remained a Conservative councillor for the rest of the term.

=== By-elections ===
==== Crewe West ====
The Crewe West by-election was triggered by the death of Labour councillor Brian Roberts in February 2020; the by-election was delayed by the COVID-19 pandemic.

Crewe West by-election: 6 May 2021
Party	Candidate	Votes	%	
Labour	Connor Naismith	724	42.3	
Conservative	Teja Vaddala	539	31.5	
Putting Crewe First	Brian Silvester	184	10.7	{{{change}}}
Green	Melanie English	126	7.4	
Independent	Roy Cartlidge	72	4.2	
Liberal Democrats	Paul Weaver	55	3.2	
Workers Party	Chris McGrane	13	0.8	
Majority		185	10.8	{{{change}}}
Turnout			22.63	
Labour hold				

==== Wilmslow Dean Row ====
The Wilmslow Dean Row by-election was triggered by the resignation of Residents of Wilmslow councillor Toni Fox, who was relocating with her family to Shropshire.

Wilmslow Dean Row by-election: 2 September 2021
Party	Candidate	Votes	%	
Residents of Wilmslow	Lata Anderson	447	50.7	
Conservative	Frank McCarthy	354	40.2	
Liberal Democrats	Birgitta Hoffmann	46	5.2	
Green	James Booth	34	3.9	
Majority		93	10.6	{{{change}}}
Turnout			22.5	
Residents of Wilmslow hold				

== Notes ==
- Italics denote a sitting councillor for the same ward.

1. Elected as a Conservative councillor for the same ward in 2015.
