= Balloon syndrome =

Rare condition in hedgehogs

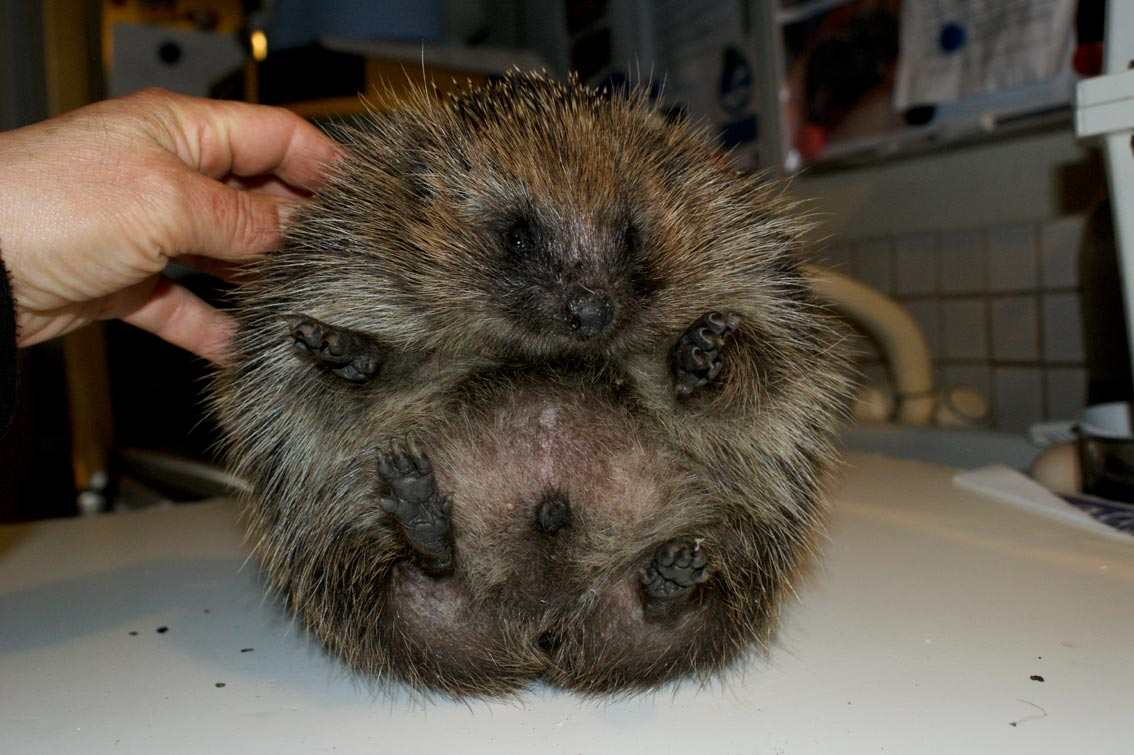
Hedgehog suffering from balloon syndrome before deflating

Balloon syndrome is a rare condition in hedgehogs in which gas is trapped under the skin as a result of injury or infection, causing the animal to inflate. It is akin to surgical emphysema seen in humans, although somewhat more profound in hedgehogs due to their tissue structure. It is thought to be caused by a sudden blow to the hedgehog, such as a kick from a horse or human. Balloon syndrome is a life threatening condition, and without medical intervention the hedgehog will die of suffocation.

== Reported incidents ==
In 2017 the BBC reported a case in which a male hedgehog was "almost twice its natural size, literally blown up like a beach ball with incredibly taut skin". The head vet at Stapeley's Wildlife Hospital, Bev Panto, said, "In my career I have seen three or four of these cases and they are very strange every time and quite shocking [...] When you first see them they appear to be very big hedgehogs but when you pick them up they feel so light because they are mostly air". She added that the condition was unique to hedgehogs because they have significant space under their skin as a result of their ability to curl up. A similar case had been reported in 2013. In 2024, a hedgehog that was spotted by a passing bus passenger "swollen to the size of a football" was successfully deflated by rescuers in Gloucestershire.

== Causes ==
In July 2017 Live Science reported Romain Pizzi, the specialist wildlife veterinary surgeon at the Scottish Society for the Prevention of Cruelty to Animals (Scottish SPCA), saying that, "Hedgehogs have a little windpipe that runs from their mouth and nose to their lungs, and at the top of this windpipe is the glottis, which opens and closes as hedgehogs breathe. [...] If a hedgehog is struck when that glottis is open, air simply flows out of the lungs and out of the body. But if the glottis is closed when the animal is struck, that air has nowhere to go, and the lung tissue can rupture. It's like a balloon popping. [...] This trauma can also cause damage to the muscles in between a hedgehog's ribs". Live Science added that "the ruptures in the lungs and rib muscles [according to Pizzi] 'act like a one-way valve,' so air can flow out of the lungs and into the body cavity—but not back in. So, with each breath the hedgehog takes, a bit of air leaks out, causing the hedgehog to inflate itself. [...] Pizzi noted that the tissue under a hedgehog's skin isn't designed to be filled with air, so it's not one big open compartment. Instead, there is a lot of connective tissue under the skin, sectioning areas off into little compartments of air. Though it's called balloon syndrome, in most cases the hedgehogs 'puff up more like Bubble Wrap,' he said".

== Treatment ==
Balloon syndrome is a very painful condition with the skin stretched tight and the air beneath compressing the organs, so the first treatment is pain relief. The hedgehog will be suffering from severe stress, being unable to curl into a ball and defend itself, so it must be treated quietly and as quickly as possible.

A large gauge needle attached to a 3-way stopcock is used to aspirate the air. It is necessary to enter at several sites to release the air, as the space beneath the skin is compartmentalised by connective tissue, not one big space.

The patient will be dehydrated and hungry, as the condition prevents the hedgehog reaching down to drink or eat. It is vital that the hedgehog be left to recover in appropriate surroundings, given food and water and antibiotic cover. The procedure may need repeating the following day, if more air accumulates.
