= Listed buildings in Stapeley =

Stapeley is a former civil parish in Cheshire East, England. It contained six buildings that are recorded in the National Heritage List for England as designated listed buildings, all of which are listed at Grade II. This grade is the lowest of the three gradings given to listed buildings and is applied to "buildings of national importance and special interest". The parish was mainly rural and all the listed buildings are houses, two of them being timber-framed.

Name and location	Photograph	Date	Notes
Yewtree Farmhouse; 53.04782°N 2.47641°W	—	Late 16th to early 17th century	The farmhouse was extended in the 18th century. It is mainly timber-framed with brick infill, and partly in brick, with a thatched roof. There is one panel with wattle and daub infill. The house is in two storeys and has a T-shaped plan. It has a gabled porch, and casement windows.
Haymoorgreen Farmhouse; 53.05412°N 2.48002°W	—	Before 1626	The farmhouse was extended later in the 17th century, and again between 1836 and 1875, and was renovated in about 1950. It is timber-framed on a brick plinth, some of the infill is brick and some is wattle and daub, and it has been pebbledashed. The roof is tiled. The house is in two storeys, with casement windows, those in the upper floor being in gabled dormers. Inside is much remaining timber-framing, and an inglenook.
Manor Farmhouse; 53.06183°N 2.48576°W	—	Early 18th century	A brick house with a tiled roof, it is in two storeys and has a T-shaped plan. The front facing the road is in two bays. The windows are casements.
Stapeley House; 53.05033°N 2.49255°W		1778	A brick house with a slate roof, it was remodelled in 1847–48 by Anthony Salvin, who added stone dressings to the front. During the 20th century a three-storey, four-bay brick wing was added to the north and a single storey extension to the south. The original block has a symmetrical three-bay front. The central bay is in stone and contains a doorway flanked by pilasters and rustication. Above it is a window with niches on the sides and a pediment above. The outer bays contain two-storey canted bay windows. Most of the windows are sashes. The building has since been used for offices.
Oakfield; 53.04465°N 2.48581°W	—	Late 18th to early 19th century	A brick house with stone dressings and a tiled roof. It is in three storeys and has a symmetrical three-bay front. At the centre is a porch with Doric columns. The windows are sashes with wedge lintels.
Stapeley Old Hall; 53.05283°N 2.49386°W	—	Early 19th century	A stuccoed house with a slate roof in late Georgian style. It is in two storeys, and has a front of seven bays. The entrance is in a semicircular bowed projection to the left of centre, and contains a doorway with pilasters, an open pediment and a fanlight. On top of the projection is a conical roof. Most of the windows are sashes.
