= Batherton =

Former civil parish in Cheshire, England

Coordinates: 53.053°N 2.511°W

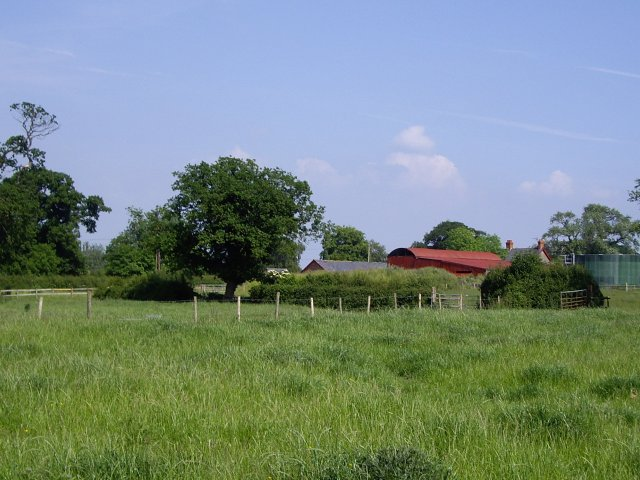
- Farm buildings, Batherton

- Location within Cheshire
- Population: 124 (2011)
- OS grid reference: SJ657508
- Civil parish: Stapeley and District
- Unitary authority: Cheshire East
- Ceremonial county: Cheshire
- Region: North West
- Country: England
- Sovereign state: United Kingdom
- Post town: NANTWICH
- Postcode district: CW5
- Dialling code: 01270
- Police: Cheshire
- Fire: Cheshire
- Ambulance: North West
- UK Parliament: Crewe and Nantwich

Batherton is a former civil parish, now in the parish of Stapeley and District, in the unitary authority area of Cheshire East and the ceremonial county of Cheshire, England. It lies immediately south of Nantwich and is jointly administered with the nearby settlement of Stapeley. In 2011 the parish had a population of 124. The River Weaver runs along the western boundary, and its floodplain provides a habitat for wetland species, including the great crested newt and the nationally rare black poplar (Populus nigra subspecies betulifolia).

== Governance ==
Batherton is administered by Stapeley and District Parish Council jointly with the larger adjacent parish of Stapeley. From 1974 the civil parish was served by Crewe and Nantwich Borough Council, which was succeeded on 1 April 2009 by the new unitary authority of Cheshire East. Batherton falls in the parliamentary constituency of Crewe and Nantwich, which has been represented by Kieran Mullan since 2019, after being represented by Laura Smith (2017–19), Edward Timpson (2008–17) and Gwyneth Dunwoody (1983–2008).

Batherton was formerly a township in the parish of Wybunbury, in 1866 Batherton became a civil parish, on 1 April 2023 the parish was abolished and merged with Stapeley to form "Stapeley and District".

== Geography, ecology and transport ==
The civil parish has an area of 173 hectares (430 acres). It is rural, with the land use being predominantly agricultural. Farms include New Dairy House Farm, The Willow Farm, Mill Bank Farm, Mill Lane Farm, Batherton Farm, Hollies Farm and Grove Farm. Much of the area is classified by Cheshire Wildlife Trust (CWT) as "East Lowland Plain" with the south east being "Lower Farms and Woods". The River Weaver forms much of the western boundary, with a short stretch near Mill Bank Farm falling within the parish, and Ardle Brook runs along the southern boundary. The area around the Weaver and part of Ardle Brook has been described by CWT as having medium or high habitat distinctiveness and providing a significant corridor for wildlife. The Weaver floodplain harbours wetland species including the great crested newt and native black poplar (Populus nigra subspecies betulifolia), which are among the rarest British trees. The ground is flat, with an average elevation of around 45 metres (148 ft); the low point is below 40 metres (130 ft) at the Weaver and the high point above 50 metres (160 ft) near Hollies Farm in the south east. There are several small areas of woodland within the parish, including Elliott's Wood, Millennium Wood and Smiths Millennium Wood. Numerous small meres and ponds are scattered across the area, particularly in Millennium Wood.

The A529 (Broad Lane) from Nantwich runs along or just to the east of the eastern boundary, and from it, no-through lanes serve New Dairy House Farm, and Batherton Hall, Mill Bank Farm and The Mill House. The Crewe and Nantwich Circular Walk, a long-distance footpath, runs from Broad Lane to Mill Bank Farm, where it crosses the Weaver via a footbridge.

== Demography ==
In the 2001 census, the civil parish had a population of 36. In the 2011 census, Batherton had a recorded population of 124, in 52 households. (Note: The area recorded as being included differs substantially from the current civil parish.) The historical population figures are 25 (1801), 28 (1851), 29 (1901) and 58 (1951).

== Landmarks ==
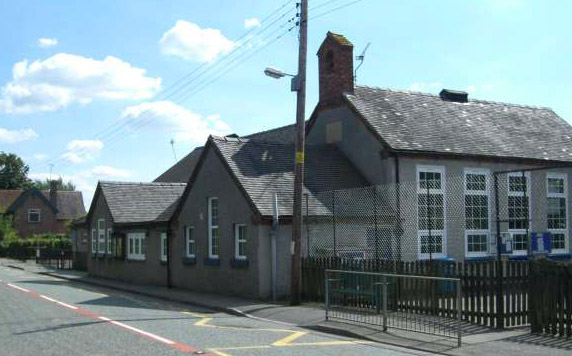
Stapeley Broad Lane School

Two former farmhouses in the parish are listed at grade II, the lowest of the three grades. Batherton Hall (SJ6596649866) is in red brick with stone quoins and a tiled roof; it dates originally from the mid-17th century and was subsequently extended with front and back bays and divided into two dwellings. Batherton Dairy House (SJ6568450474) is an L-shaped, three-storey, red-brick building with basements and a tiled roof; it dates originally from the late 17th century and has also been divided into two dwellings.

== Education ==
Stapeley Broad Lane Church of England Primary School dates from 1854 and straddles the boundary with Stapeley. For secondary education, the parish falls in the catchment area of Brine Leas School, just to the north of the parish in Nantwich.

== See also ==
- Listed buildings in Batherton
