= Stapeley House =

Country house in Stapeley, Cheshire, England

Coordinates: 53.0505°N 2.4928°W

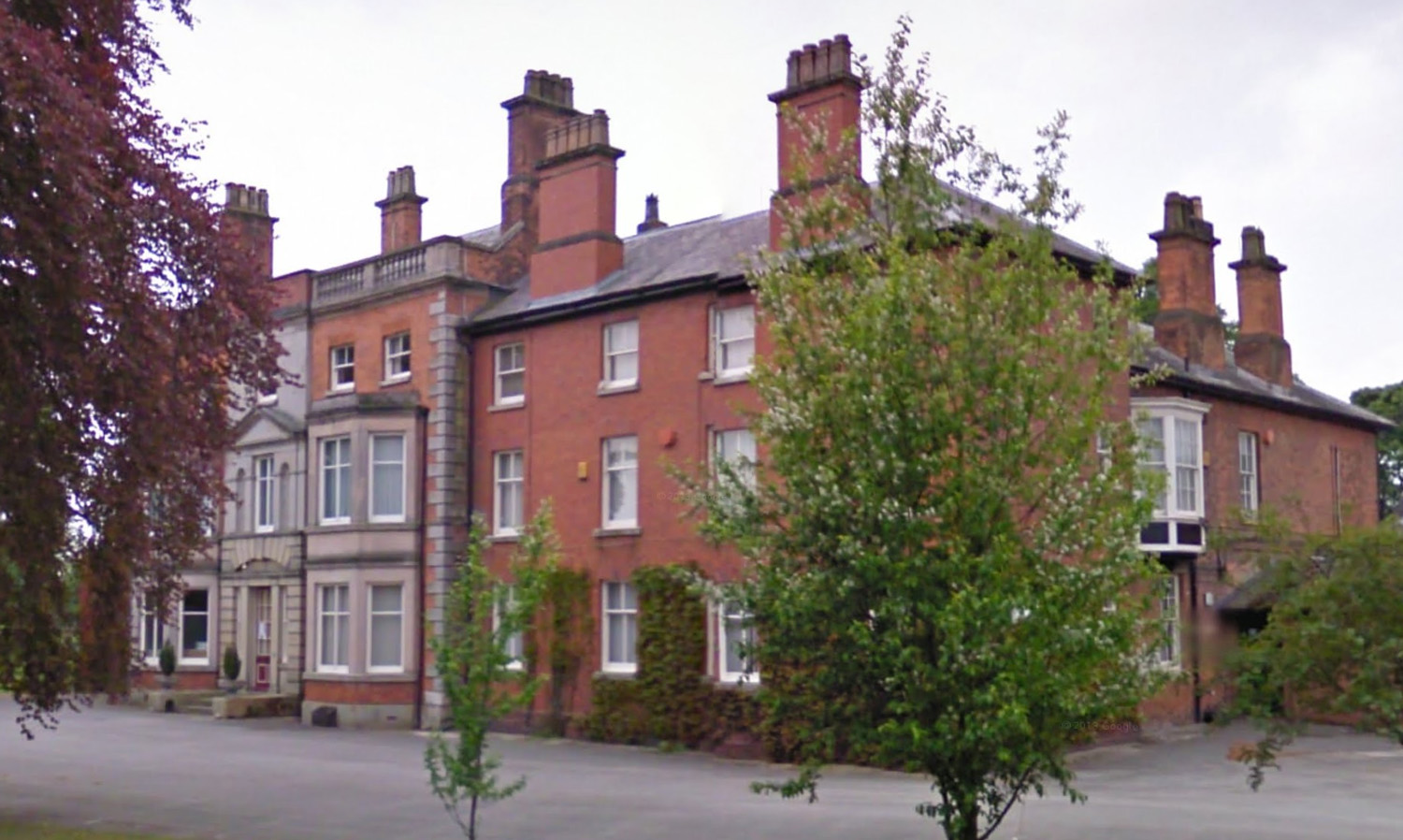
Stapeley House

Stapeley House is a country house in London Road, Stapeley, Cheshire. The house is recorded in the National Heritage List for England as a designated Grade II listed building. It was built in 1778, and remodelled in 1847–48 by Anthony Salvin. It has subsequently been converted for use as offices, alterations being carried out during the 20th century. The house is constructed in brick with ashlar dressings, and it has a slate roof. It is in three storeys, with an entrance front of three bays. To the right is a lower four-bay wing, also in three storeys. At the rear of the house are 20th-century additions.

== John Burscoe ==
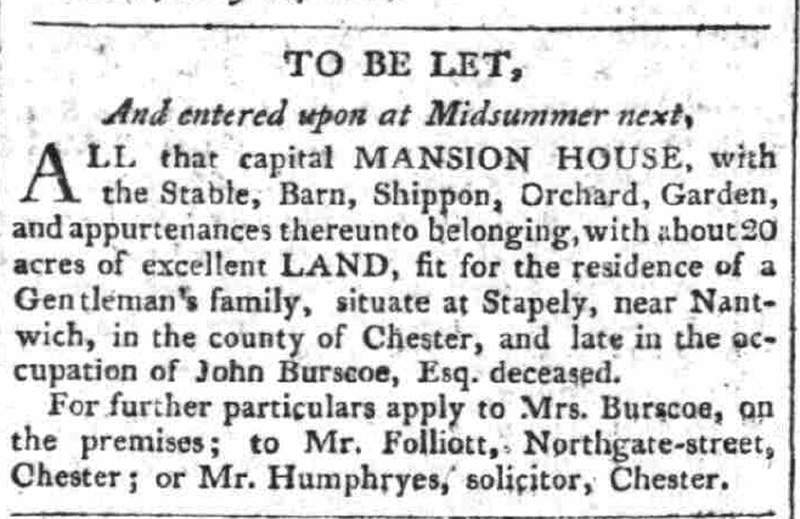
Rental notice for Stapeley House 1809

John Burscoe built Stapeley House in about 1788. He was born in 1737 in Wybunbury. His father was James Burscoe who owned a house in Stapeley and his mother was Katherine Skerrett. In 1737 his father was killed when the Market House in Nantwich collapsed.

In 1771, he married Elizabeth Turner at Wybunbury. The couple had several children but their only surviving offspring was Catherine who was born in 1772. In 1788 John built Stapeley House near the site of the old family residence which was subsequently demolished.

In 1798, his daughter Catherine married William Harwood Folliott, a merchant from Chester. When John Burscoe died in 1809 Catherine as his only heir inherited Stapeley House.

== The Folliott family ==
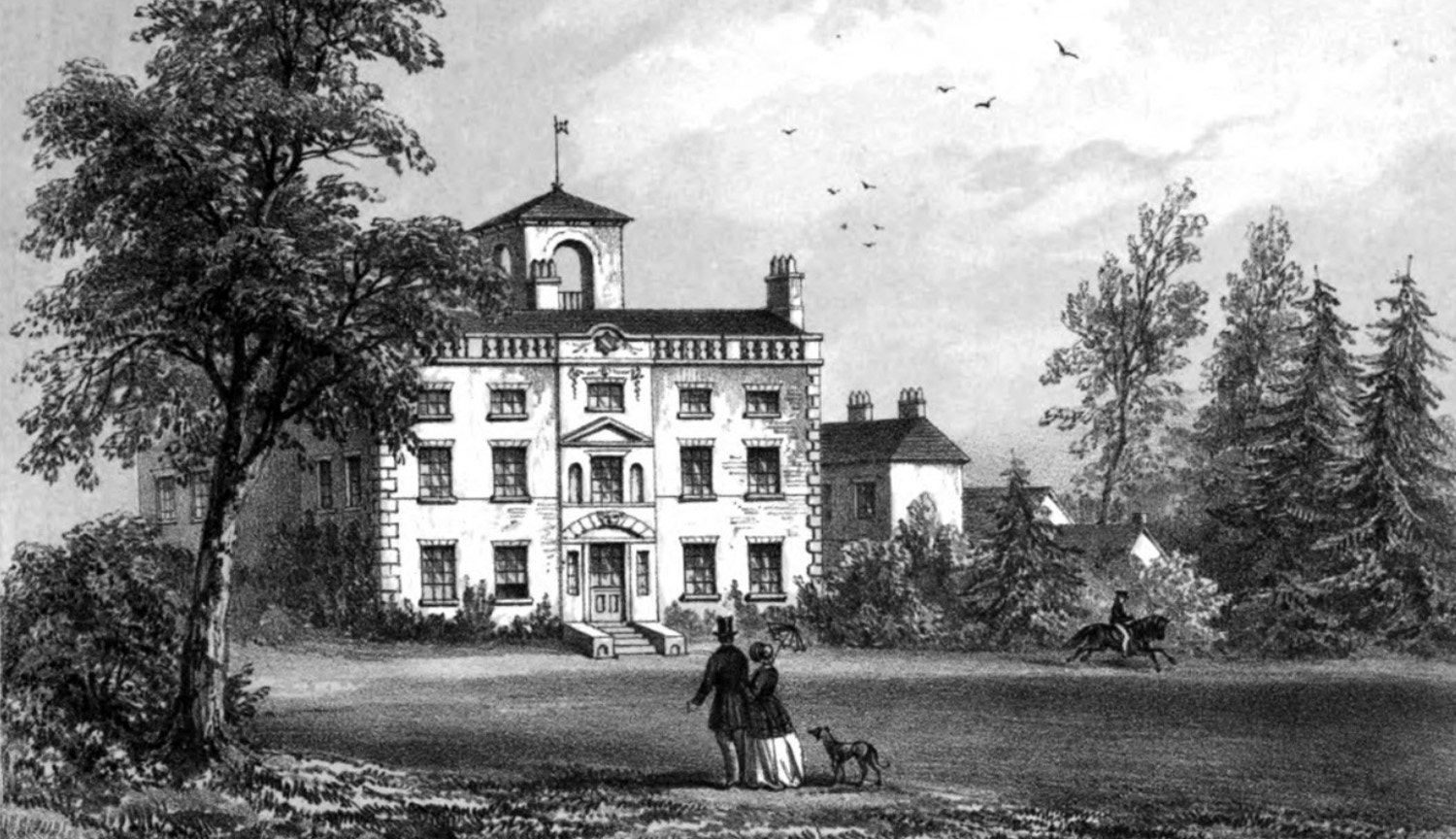
Stapeley House in 1852

William Harwood Folliott was born in 1761 in Chester. His father was James Folliott of Eaton Hall in Cheshire. This Hall was demolished and a much larger house constructed in the early nineteenth century.

William married Catherine Burscoe in 1798 and the couple had four children, two boys and two girls. James was the eldest son and he became a clergyman. When William died in 1831 Reverend James Folliott inherited Stapeley House.

In about 1848 he commissioned Anthony Salvin, the famous architect, to remodel the house. He added the stone frontispiece and two canted bay windows. A drawing of the house was made shortly after this in 1852 and is shown. When James died in 1876 the male line of the Folliott family came to an end. The house was sold several years later and was bought by Major Robert Kearsley.

== The Kearsley family ==
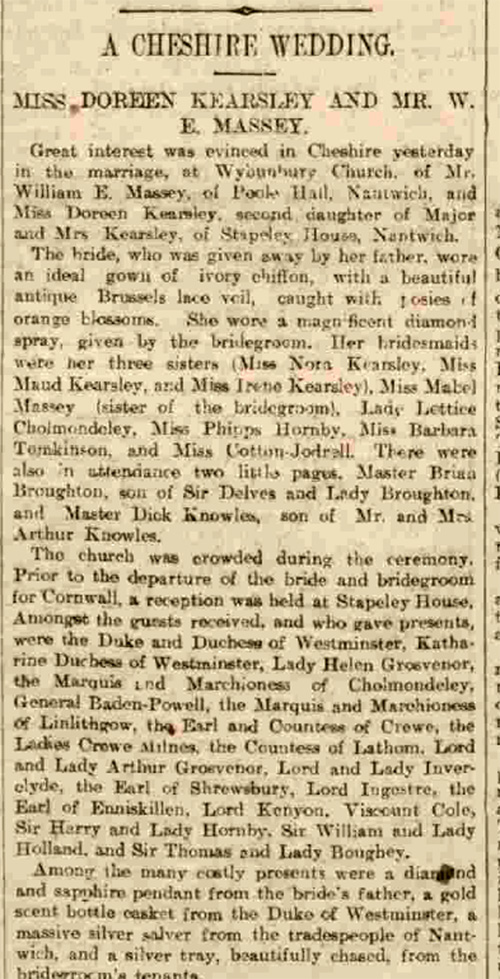
Wedding at Stapeley House in 1904

Major Robert Wilson Kearsley was born in 1848 in Lancashire. His father was Edward Tertius Kearsley, a property owner in Liverpool. In 1869 Robert joined the 5th Dragoon Guards and over the next fifteen years was progressively promoted to the rank of Major. In 1877 he married Margaret Lowther Irving Fergusson and the couple had six children.

The family moved to Stapeley House in about 1882 when Robert retired from the military forces. He appears to known many people in high society as in 1904 his daughter's reception was held at Stapeley House and the guests included many notable people including General Baden-Powell. The newspaper article about the wedding is shown.

The Kearsley family sold the house in about 1910 and it was bought by Lieutenant Colonel Christie-Miller.

== The Christie-Miller family ==
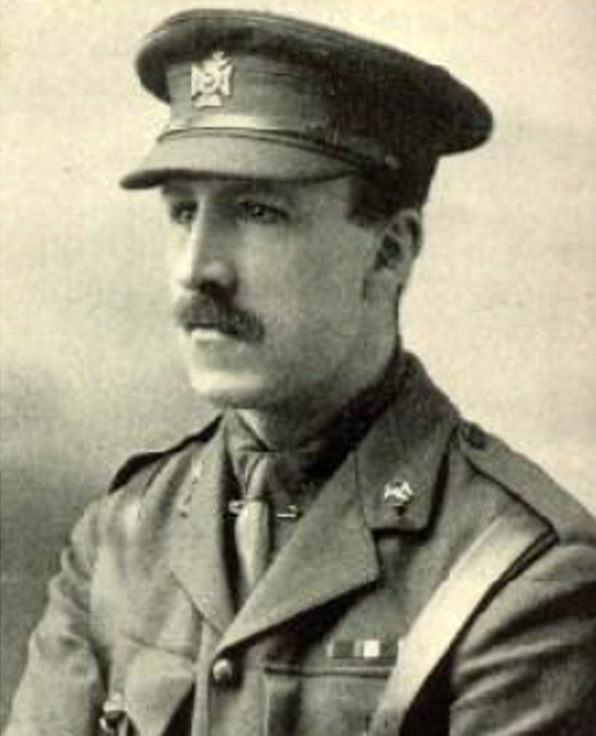
Lieutenant Colonel Geoffrey Christie-Miller

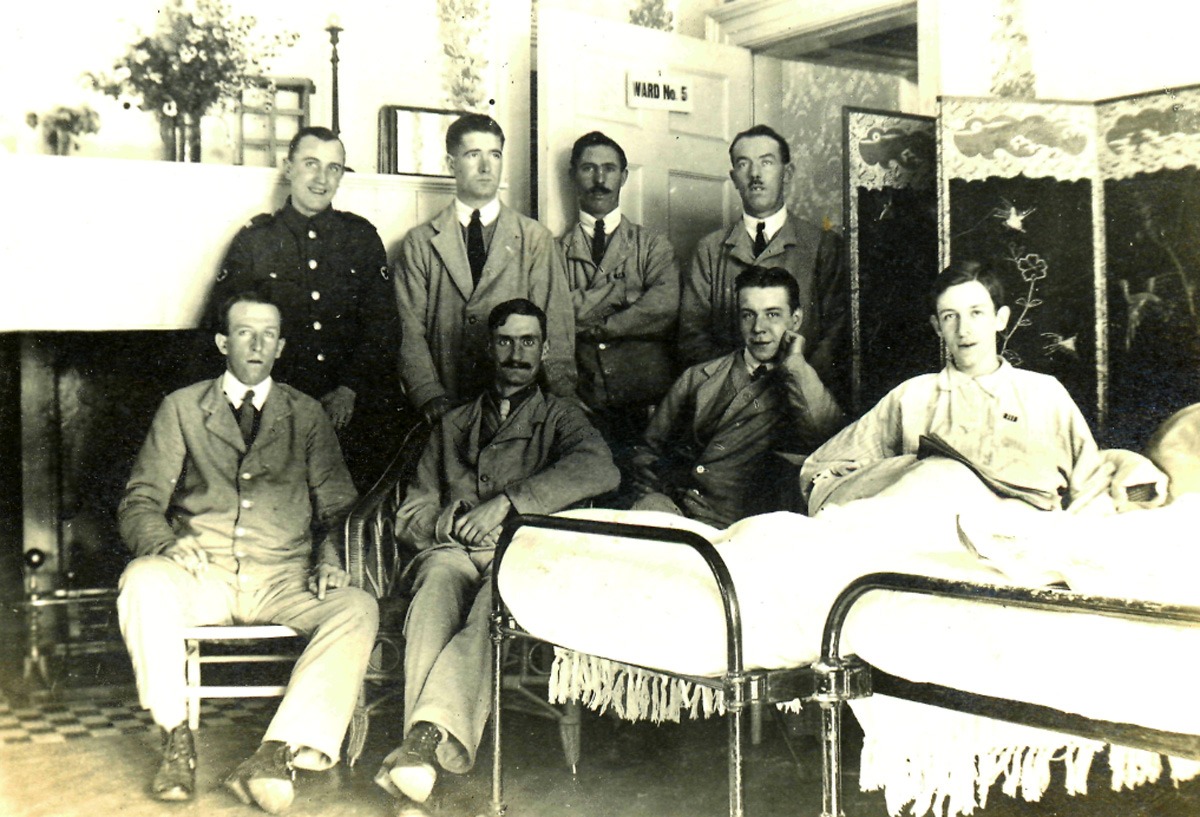
Wounded soldiers at Stapeley House in 1916

Lieutenant Colonel Sir Geoffrey Christie-Miller was born in 1881 in London. His father was Wakefield Christie-Miller whose family owned Christys Hats. He however also inherited several estates when his uncle died and became very wealthy. When Wakefield died in 1898 Geoffrey inherited some of this property and was able to live independently. He was also a member of the Christys’ hat firm. In 1908 he married Kathleen Olive Thorpe, the daughter of John Henry Thorpe who was an Archdeacon. Soon after he bought Stapeley House and four of his five children were born there. In 1914 he enlisted in the armed services to fight in the War. He had a very distinguished war service and was mentioned in despatches and decorated with the award of the Military Cross. He was also decorated with the award of the Companion, Distinguished Service Order (D.S.O.) in 1919.

During the War he offered Stapeley House to serve as a hospital. In 1916 about 137 wounded men were transferred here for treatment and to await recovery. They all praised highly the excellent conditions and provisions made for them during their convalescence. A photo of some of the soldiers who were here during the War is shown.

== See also ==
- Listed buildings in Stapeley
