= Listed buildings in Batherton =

Batherton is a former civil parish in Cheshire East, England. It contained two buildings that are recorded in the National Heritage List for England as designated listed buildings, both of which are at Grade II. This grade is the lowest of the three gradings given to listed buildings and is applied to "buildings of national importance and special interest". The parish was entirely rural. Both the listed buildings are former farmhouses, later extended and divided into two dwellings.

Name and location	Photograph	Date	Notes
Batherton Hall; 53.04466°N 2.50863°W	—	Mid 17th century	This was originally a farmhouse, and has since been extended and divided into two houses. It is in brick with a tiled roof. The original part has two storeys with an attic and a four-bay front, standing on a plinth that is partly in stone and partly in brick. There is a two-storey two-bay wing at the rear, and a two-storey, one-bay wing at the northeast. Other than one sash window, the windows are all casements.
Batherton Dairy House; 53.05029°N 2.51343°W	—	Late 17th century	Originally a farmhouse, it has been altered into two houses. The building is in brick with a tiled roof, has three storeys with a basement, and a three-bay front. There is a two-bay wing to the rear, giving it an L-shaped plan. The windows are casements. Inside is an inglenook beam.
