= 2008 Cheshire East Council election =

2008 UK local government election

Results of the 2008 Cheshire East Council election

Elections to the newly created Cheshire East Council took place on 1 May 2008. Elections occurred in all 27 wards, with each ward returning three councillors to the council. The wards were identical to the former Cheshire County Council wards.

From May 2008 until April 2009, the elected members formed a "shadow" council, which made preparations for the changeover from the county and borough structure to the new unitary authority structure. Thereafter, the members serve for two years from May 2009 with the next elections scheduled for May 2011.

== Results ==
The Conservative Party took overall control of the council with a majority of 37 councillors.

After the election, the composition of the council was:

- Conservative 59
- Liberal Democrat 12
- Labour 6
- Middlewich First 3
- Nantwich Independent 1

Cheshire East Council election – 2008 – summary
Party	Seats	Gains	Losses	Net gain/loss	Seats %	Votes %	Votes	+/−
Conservative	59				72.8	54.2	152,944	+12.9
Liberal Democrats	12				14.8	21.5	60,639	-6.0
Labour	6				7.4	13.9	39,264	-8.8
Middlewich First	3				3.7	1.4	4,069	+0.5
Nantwich Independent	1				1.2	1.5	4,262	+0.1
Green	0				0.0	1.1	3,101	-1.5
BNP	0				0.0	0.4	1,095	-0.2
UKIP	0				0.0	0.3	780	+0.3
Other	0				0.0	5.6	15,805	+2.8

N.B. The change in voting percentages refers to the change since the 2005 Cheshire Council election, the last time that voting took place in the same wards.

=== Comparison with projections based on the 2005 results ===
At the 2005 Cheshire County Council election, there were 15 Conservative controlled wards, 6 Labour controlled wards, 5 Liberal Democrat controlled wards and 1 ward controlled by an independent. Based on the 2005 results, the Cheshire East Council election would have resulted in 45 Conservative councillors, 18 Labour councillors, 15 Liberal Democrat councillors and 3 independents; the projected results would have given the Conservatives overall control of the council, with a majority of 9 councillors.

== Results by ward ==
=== Alderley ward ===
Current county councillor: Mark Asquith (Conservative)

Alderley ward candidates
Party	Candidate	Votes	%	±%
Conservative	Carolyn Andrew	2,992	25.6	
Conservative	Frank Keegan	2,928	25.0	
Conservative	Elizabeth Gilliland	2,924	25.0	
Liberal Democrats	Craig Browne	1,379	11.8	
Independent	Basil Hanson	873	7.5	
Labour	Ashley Pettifer	606	5.2	

=== Alsager ward ===
Current county councillor: Rod Fletcher (Liberal Democrat)

Alsager ward candidates
Party	Candidate	Votes	%	±%
Liberal Democrats	Rod Fletcher	2,165	19.4	
Liberal Democrats	Derek Hough	2,095	18.8	
Liberal Democrats	Shirley Jones	2,004	17.9	
Conservative	Bill Finney	1,119	10.0	
Conservative	Lynn Stocks	882	7.9	
Conservative	Peter Kolker	877	7.9	
BNP	Steve Davies	429	3.8	
BNP	Matthew Bee	369	3.3	
Labour	Robert Ashley	332	3.0	
Labour	Kathleen Clarke	308	2.8	
BNP	Lee Carbutt	297	2.7	
Labour	Neil Clarke	288	2.6	

=== Bollington and Disley ward ===
Current county councillor: Sylvia Roberts (Liberal Democrat)

Bollington and Disley ward candidates
Party	Candidate	Votes	%	±%
Conservative	Matthew Davies	2,410	16.8	
Conservative	Harold Davenport	2,394	16.7	
Conservative	Diana Thompson	2,219	15.5	
Liberal Democrats	Sylvia Roberts	1,868	13.0	
Liberal Democrats	Shirley Sockett	1,379	9.6	
Liberal Democrats	Chris Makepeace	1,129	7.9	
Independent	Heidi Reid	1,056	7.4	
Labour	David Laffan	836	5.8	
Labour	Anne Jackson-Baker	567	4.0	
Labour	Gordon Sutton	484	3.4	

=== Broken Cross ward ===
Current county councillor: David Freear (Conservative)

Broken Cross ward candidates
Party	Candidate	Votes	%	±%
Liberal Democrats	Ainsley Arnold	1,568	17.0	
Liberal Democrats	John Goddard	1,494	16.2	
Liberal Democrats	John Narraway	1,289	13.9	
Conservative	David Freear	1,250	13.5	
Conservative	Penny Meakin	1,162	12.6	
Conservative	Anna-Marie Robinson	1,068	11.5	
Independent	Lloyd Roberts	623	6.7	
Labour	David Pemberton	273	3.0	
Labour	Margaret Readman	271	2.9	
Labour	Sandra Edwards	252	2.7	

=== Bucklow ward ===
Current county councillor: Steve Wilkinson (Conservative)

Bucklow ward candidates
Party	Candidate	Votes	%	±%
Conservative	George Walton	2,889	26.6	
Conservative	Jamie MacRae	2,874	26.4	
Conservative	Andrew Knowles	2,663	24.5	
Independent	Sybil Crossman	755	6.9	
Liberal Democrats	Ann Barlow	737	6.8	
Labour	Richard Jackson	625	5.7	
Independent	Dave Bailey	335	3.1	

=== Cholmondeley ward ===
Current county councillor: Allan Richardson (Conservative)

Cholmondeley ward candidates
Party	Candidate	Votes	%	±%
Conservative	Rachel Bailey	3,350	29.2	
Conservative	Margaret Hollins	3,119	27.2	
Conservative	Allan Richardson	3,117	27.1	
Liberal Democrats	Richard Fox	821	7.1	
Labour	Natalie Kent	543	4.7	
Labour	Thomas Dunlop	535	4.7	

=== Congleton Rural ward ===
Current county councillor: Ken Oliver (Conservative)

Congleton Rural ward candidates
Party	Candidate	Votes	%	±%
Conservative	Les Gilbert	2,518	19.6	
Conservative	Andrew Kolker	2,507	19.5	
Conservative	John Wray	2,352	18.3	
Liberal Democrats	Mike Oliver	1,287	10.0	
Liberal Democrats	David Savage	1,240	9.7	
Liberal Democrats	Nick Guthrie	1,185	9.2	
Independent	Ken Oliver	932	7.3	
Independent	Roger Bennett	814	6.3	

=== Congleton Town East ward ===
Current county councillor: Peter Mason (Conservative)

Congleton Town East ward candidates
Party	Candidate	Votes	%	±%
Conservative	David Brown	2,189	24.2	
Conservative	Peter Mason	2,143	23.7	
Conservative	Andrew Thwaite	2,078	23.0	
Liberal Democrats	Denis Murphy	709	7.9	
Labour	Robert Boston	688	7.6	
Liberal Democrats	Linda Hemsley	625	6.9	
Liberal Democrats	Tim Muston	597	6.6	

=== Congleton Town West ward ===
Current county councillor: Bill Wolstencroft (Conservative)

Congleton Town West ward candidates
Party	Candidate	Votes	%	±%
Conservative	Gordon Baxendale	1,978	20.6	
Conservative	Roland Domleo	1,861	19.4	
Conservative	David Topping	1,856	19.3	
Liberal Democrats	Jeanne Whitehurst	1,281	13.3	
Liberal Democrats	Margaret Gartside	1,085	11.3	
Liberal Democrats	Keith Heron	931	9.7	
Labour	Lisa Bossons	609	6.3	

=== Crewe East ward ===
Current county councillor: Gordon Fyffe (Labour)

Crewe East ward candidates
Party	Candidate	Votes	%	±%
Labour	Chris Thorley	1,512	17.4	
Labour	Peggy Martin	1,481	17.0	
Labour	Steve Conquest	1,359	15.6	
Conservative	Eddie Ankers	1,063	12.2	
Conservative	Paul Morrey	935	10.8	
Conservative	Stuart Davies	922	10.6	
Liberal Democrats	Robert Icke	901	10.4	
UKIP	Lawrence Leat	523	6.0	

=== Crewe North ward ===
Current county councillor: Peter Nurse (Labour)

Crewe North ward candidates
Party	Candidate	Votes	%	±%
Labour	Terry Beard	1,135	15.2	
Conservative	Derek Bebbington	1,118	14.9	
Conservative	John Jones	1,085	14.5	
Labour	Maureen Grant	1,047	14.0	
Labour	Peter Nurse	923	12.3	
Conservative	Robert Hanford	883	11.8	
Independent	Byron Evans	766	10.2	
Independent	Maggie Bray	525	7.0	

=== Crewe South ward ===
Current county councillor: Dorothy Flude (Labour)

Crewe South ward candidates
Party	Candidate	Votes	%	±%
Liberal Democrats	David Cannon	1,568	16.4	
Liberal Democrats	Elizabeth Howell	1,367	14.3	
Labour	Dorothy Flude	1,249	13.1	
Liberal Democrats	Stefan Krizanac	1,196	12.5	
Labour	Pam Minshall	1,119	11.7	
Labour	Steven Hogben	1,096	11.5	
Conservative	Catherine Murphy	638	6.7	
Conservative	Keith Healey	634	6.6	
Conservative	Frank Lepisz	491	5.1	
Independent	Adrian Jardine	211	2.2	

=== Crewe West ward ===
Current county councillor: David Newton (Labour)

Crewe West ward candidates
Party	Candidate	Votes	%	±%
Conservative	Margaret Weatherill	1,257	16.2	
Labour	Roy Cartlidge	1,235	15.9	
Conservative	Robert Parker	1,188	15.3	
Labour	David Newton	1,135	14.6	
Conservative	Christopher Goff	1,088	14.0	
Labour	Louise Musa	1,071	13.8	
Liberal Democrats	John Phillips	456	5.9	
Green	Peter Wilson	339	4.4	

=== Doddington ward ===
Current county councillor: David Brickhill (Conservative)

Doddington ward candidates
Party	Candidate	Votes	%	±%
Conservative	David Brickhill	2,821	21.9	
Conservative	John Hammond	2,700	21.0	
Conservative	Rodney Walker	2,538	19.7	
Independent	Marshall Nield	997	7.7	
Independent	Maureen Campbell	953	7.4	
Labour	Patricia Dowling	668	5.2	
Independent	Tess Eatough	651	5.1	
Liberal Democrats	Adrian Hancock	620	4.8	
Green	Guy Gower	480	3.7	
Green	Susan Gower	459	3.6	

=== Knutsford ward ===
Current county councillor: Bert Grange (Conservative)

Knutsford ward candidates
Party	Candidate	Votes	%	±%
Conservative	Bert Grange	2,396	22.5	
Conservative	Olivia Hunter	2,352	22.0	
Conservative	Tony Ranfield	2,328	21.8	
Liberal Democrats	Caroline Aldhouse	1,000	9.4	
Liberal Democrats	Francis Aldhouse	922	8.6	
Liberal Democrats	Roger Barlow	904	8.5	
Labour	Laurie Burton	769	7.2	

=== Macclesfield Forest ward ===
Current county councillor: Barrie Hardern (Conservative)

Macclesfield Forest ward candidates
Party	Candidate	Votes	%	±%
Conservative	Hilda Gaddum	2,021	23.2	
Conservative	Lesley Smetham	1,864	21.4	
Conservative	Marc Asquith	1,586	18.2	
Labour	Brian Puddicombe	931	10.7	
Labour	Steve Carter	833	9.5	
Labour	Gill Boston	788	9.0	
Green	Belinda Brett	703	8.1	

=== Macclesfield Town ward ===
Current county councillor: Nell Carter (Labour)

Macclesfield Town ward candidates
Party	Candidate	Votes	%	±%
Liberal Democrats	Stephen Broadhurst	1,521	17.4	
Liberal Democrats	David Neilson	1,480	17.0	
Liberal Democrats	Christine Tomlinson	1,369	15.7	
Conservative	Margaret Slater	689	7.9	
Conservative	Lee Williamson	671	7.7	
Labour	Simon Truss	670	7.7	
Conservative	Valerie Lipworth	635	7.3	
Labour	Nell Carter	604	6.9	
Labour	Richard Watson	593	6.8	
Green	Dougal Hare	497	5.7	

=== Macclesfield West ward ===
Current county councillor: Ken Edwards (Labour)

Macclesfield West ward candidates
Party	Candidate	Votes	%	±%
Conservative	Sandy Bentley	1,486	18.2	
Conservative	Darryl Beckford	1,457	17.9	
Conservative	Martin Hardy	1,350	16.6	
Labour	Janet Jackson	1,142	14.0	
Labour	Alift Harewood	1,090	13.4	
Labour	Ken Edwards	995	12.2	
Green	John Knight	623	7.7	

=== Middlewich ward ===
Current county councillor: Mark Dickson (Conservative)

Middlewich ward candidates
Party	Candidate	Votes	%	±%
Middlewich First	Paul Edwards	1,417	17.0	
Middlewich First	Michael Parsons	1,397	16.8	
Middlewich First	Simon McGrory	1,255	15.1	
Conservative	Alan Hardern	907	10.9	
Conservative	Matthew Carey	721	8.7	
Conservative	Ian Huffer	717	8.6	
Liberal Democrats	Keith Bagnall	507	6.1	
Liberal Democrats	Peter Hirst	456	5.5	
Liberal Democrats	Donna Caffyn	415	5.0	
Labour	Christopher Parkes	274	3.3	
UKIP	Alan Johnson	257	3.1	

=== Nantwich ward ===
Current county councillor: Arthur Moran (Independent)

Nantwich ward candidates
Party	Candidate	Votes	%	±%
Nantwich Independent Party	Arthur Moran	1,786	15.2	
Conservative	Andrew Martin	1,776	15.1	
Conservative	Brian Dykes	1,546	13.1	
Conservative	Richard McCay	1,368	11.6	
Nantwich Independent Party	William McGinnis	1,265	10.8	
Nantwich Independent Party	Stephen Hope	1,211	10.3	
Independent	Penny Butterill	1,120	9.5	
Labour	Adrian Knapper	638	5.4	
Labour	John O'Mahoney	605	5.1	
Liberal Democrats	Bryan Halson	449	3.8	

=== Poynton ward ===
Current county councillor: Chris Claxton (Conservative)

Poynton ward candidates
Party	Candidate	Votes	%	±%
Conservative	Chris Beard	3,007	24.1	
Conservative	Howard Murray	2,753	22.1	
Conservative	Roger West	2,734	21.9	
Liberal Democrats	Frances Ball	984	7.9	
Liberal Democrats	Christopher Robinson	858	6.9	
Independent	Chris Claxton	715	5.7	
Labour	Liz Middleton	544	4.4	
Labour	Judith Elderkin	445	3.6	
Labour	Malcolm Robertson	420	3.4	

=== Prestbury and Tytherington ward ===
Current county councillor: Paul Findlow (Conservative)

Prestbury and Tytherington ward candidates
Party	Candidate	Votes	%	±%
Conservative	Thelma Jackson	2,231	21.2	
Conservative	Paul Findlow	2,133	20.2	
Conservative	William Livesley	1,810	17.2	
Independent	James Nicholas	1,796	17.0	
Independent	Brendan Murphy	1,777	16.8	
Labour	Karen Stewart	302	2.9	
Labour	David Brown	258	2.4	
Labour	Mark Stedman	240	2.3	

=== Rope ward ===
Current county councillor: Margaret Simon (Conservative)

Rope ward candidates
Party	Candidate	Votes	%	±%
Conservative	Margaret Simon	2,774	22.8	
Conservative	Ray Westwood	2,622	21.6	
Conservative	Brian Silvester	2,557	21.0	
Labour	Maurice Jones	1,259	10.4	
Liberal Democrats	Rene Hancock	1,114	9.2	
Labour	June Roberts	994	8.2	
Labour	Andy Sharp	830	6.8	

=== Sandbach ward ===
Current county councillor: Neville Price (Independent) (elected as a Conservative in 2005)

Sandbach ward candidates
Party	Candidate	Votes	%	±%
Conservative	Gillian Merry	1,781	19.7	
Conservative	Barry Moran	1,695	18.8	
Conservative	Stella Furlong	1,562	17.3	
Liberal Democrats	Bill Scragg	1,003	11.1	
Liberal Democrats	Dennis Robinson	896	9.9	
Liberal Democrats	Patrick Darnes	857	9.5	
Independent	Neville Price	682	7.6	
Labour	Keith Haines	553	6.1	

=== Sandbach East and Rode ward ===
Current county councillor: Roy Giltrap (Liberal Democrat)

Sandbach East and Rode ward candidates
Party	Candidate	Votes	%	±%
Conservative	Rhoda Bailey	1,976	17.6	
Conservative	Andrew Barratt	1,902	16.9	
Liberal Democrats	Elsie Alcock	1,800	16.1	
Conservative	Andrew Large	1,744	15.6	
Liberal Democrats	Trish Barlow	1,705	15.2	
Liberal Democrats	Knud Moller	1,376	12.2	
Labour	Bill Howell	479	4.2	
Independent	John Cliff	224	2.0	

=== Wilmslow North ward ===
Current county councillor: Adrian Bradley (Liberal Democrat)

Wilmslow North ward candidates
Party	Candidate	Votes	%	±%
Conservative	Jim Crockatt	2,502	21.1	
Conservative	Don Stockton	2,284	19.3	
Conservative	Paul Whiteley	2,204	18.6	
Liberal Democrats	Adrian Bradley	1,681	14.2	
Liberal Democrats	Mark Toombs	1,397	11.8	
Liberal Democrats	Oliver Romain	1,292	10.9	
Labour	Jon Kelly	470	4.0	

=== Wilmslow South ward ===
Current county councillor: Pat Fearnley (Liberal Democrat)

Wilmslow South ward candidates
Party	Candidate	Votes	%	±%
Conservative	Gary Barton	2,603	22.3	
Conservative	Rod Menlove	2,589	22.1	
Conservative	Wesley Fitzgerald	2,531	21.6	
Liberal Democrats	Margaret Bradley	1,317	11.3	
Liberal Democrats	Pat Fearnley	1,291	11.0	
Liberal Democrats	Richard Duncalf	1,069	9.1	
Labour	Nick Jones	291	2.5	

== See also ==
- 2008 Cheshire West and Chester Council election
