= Ettiley Heath =

Village in Cheshire, England

Coordinates: 53.142961°N 2.396736°W

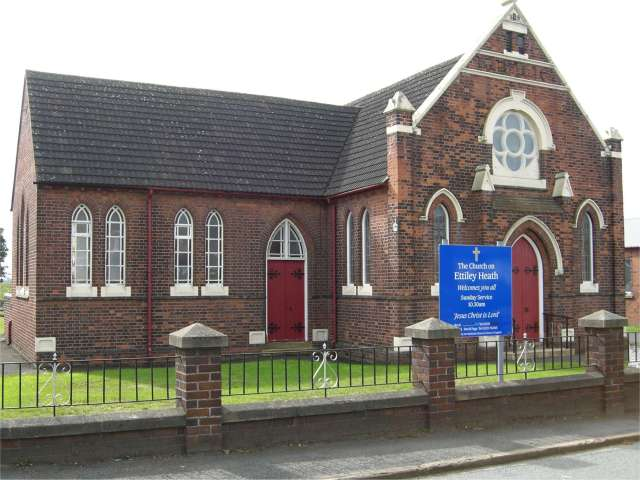
- The Church on Ettiley Heath

- Location within Cheshire
- Population: 4,409 (Ward. Sandbach Ettiley Heath and Wheelock)
- OS grid reference: SJ751590
- Civil parish: Sandbach
- Unitary authority: Cheshire East
- Ceremonial county: Cheshire
- Region: North West
- Country: England
- Sovereign state: United Kingdom
- Post town: SANDBACH
- Postcode district: CW11
- Dialling code: 01270
- Police: Cheshire
- Fire: Cheshire
- Ambulance: North West
- UK Parliament: Congleton

Ettiley Heath is a village in the civil parish of Sandbach which is in the unitary authority of Cheshire East and the ceremonial county of Cheshire, England. The Sandbach ward is called Ettiley Heath and Wheelock. The population of this ward at the 2011 Census was 4,409. It is west of Sandbach.

== Constituencies ==
Ettiley Heath is in the Congleton constituency; the MP has been Sarah Russell since 2024. Prior to Brexit in 2020 it was part of the North West Constituency for the European Parliament.

== Notes and references ==
=== Bibliography ===
- Dodgson, J. McN. (1970a). The place-names of Cheshire. Part one: Country name, regional and forest names, river names, road names, the place-names of Macclesfield hundred. Cambridge: Cambridge University Press. ISBN 0521077036.
- Dodgson, J. McN. (1970b). The place-names of Cheshire. Part two: The place-names of Bucklow Hundred and Northwich Hundred. Cambridge: Cambridge University Press. ISBN 0521079144.
- Youngs, F. A. (1991). Guide to the local administrative units of England. (Volume 1: Northern England). London: Royal Historical Society. ISBN 0861931270.
