= Middlewich First =

- Leader: James Basford
- Founded: 2003
- Dissolved: 2020
- Headquarters: 33 Long Lane; Middlewich CW10 0BL
- Ideology: Localism
- Cheshire East Council: 0 / 82
- Middlewich Town Council: 0 / 12

Middlewich First was a minor English political party based in the town of Middlewich, Cheshire.

== History ==
The party was registered in 2003, and won a majority on Middlewich Town Council in May 2003 by standing 8 unopposed candidates. All three borough seats in Middlewich were won in 2008. Mike Parsons said of their success that "I think it is certainly fair to say this result reflects the Middlewich public's genuine dislike of all politicians. They are sick of party politics and squabbling."

In the 2019 local elections, they lost their three seats on Cheshire East Council, as well as all seven seats held on Middlewich Town council. In 2020, the party was deregistered.
