= Lacey Green, Cheshire =

Council estate in Wilmslow, Cheshire, England

Coordinates: 53.33648°N 2.23123°W

Lacey Green is a residential area in the upmarket area of Wilmslow in the English county of Cheshire. The population at the 2011 Census was 4,718. It lies between Wilmslow's town centre and the village of Styal. Historically, its name was Lacy Green.

Lacey Green contains a housing estate, served by a range of local shops, a sports pavilion and a park providing open grassland, a children's play area and a BMX track. Lacey Green is 13 miles from Manchester city centre and 0.8 miles from Handforth town centre.
