= 2015 Cheshire East Council election =

2015 UK local government election

Results of the 2015 Cheshire East Council election

The 2015 Cheshire East Council election took place on 7 May 2015 to elect members of the Cheshire East Council in England. They occurred on the same day as other local elections.
