= Stapeley =

Hamlet in Cheshire, England

Coordinates: 53.043°N 2.484°W

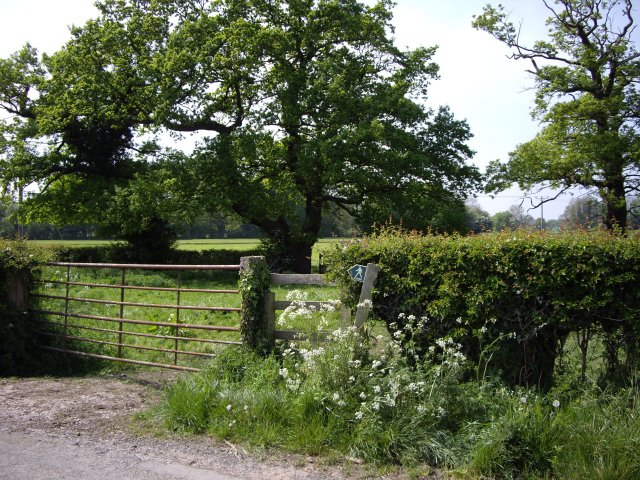
- Farmland by Annions Lane

- Location within Cheshire
- Population: 3,336 (2011)
- OS grid reference: SJ675496
- Civil parish: Stapeley and District
- Unitary authority: Cheshire East
- Ceremonial county: Cheshire
- Region: North West
- Country: England
- Sovereign state: United Kingdom
- Post town: NANTWICH
- Postcode district: CW5
- Dialling code: 01270
- Police: Cheshire
- Fire: Cheshire
- Ambulance: North West
- UK Parliament: Crewe and Nantwich

Stapeley is a hamlet (at SJ675496) and former civil parish, now in the parish of Stapeley and District, in the unitary authority area of Cheshire East and the ceremonial county of Cheshire, England. The hamlet lies 2¼ miles to the south east of Nantwich. The parish also included the small settlements of Broad Lane and Butt Green, and parts of Artle Brook, Haymoor Green and Howbeck Bank, as well as a recent residential development north of the A5301 adjacent to Nantwich. In 2008, the total population was estimated to be a little under 3000, increasing to 3,336 at the 2011 Census. Nearby villages include Shavington, Willaston and Wybunbury.

== History ==
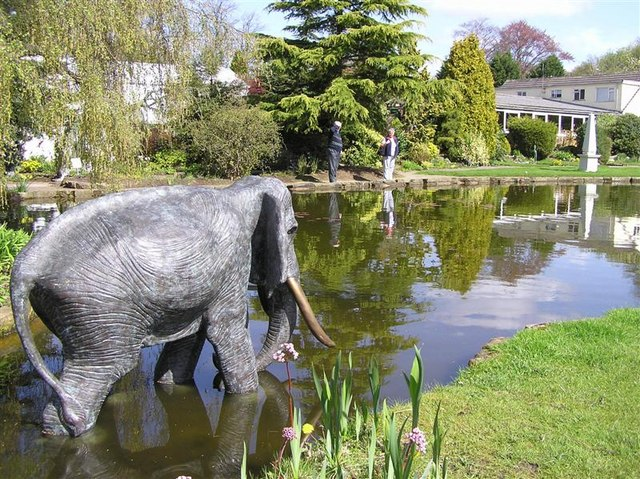
Stapeley Water Gardens in 2006

Stapeley appears in the Domesday survey as Steple; it was then held by William Malbank, who held much of the land in the Nantwich hundred.

Stapeley Water Gardens garden centre at Butt Green (SJ664512) opened in 1965 and became a major tourist attraction, drawing 1.3 million annual visitors. It included a small zoo, the Palms Tropical Oasis. The zoo closed in 2010, and the remainder of the Water Gardens closed the following year.

The Cronkinson Farm housing estate was built in the 1990s and further residential development adjacent to the town of Nantwich followed, reducing the rural character of the northern part of the civil parish.

== Governance ==
Stapeley is administered by Stapeley and District Parish Council jointly with the adjacent parish of Batherton. From 1974 the civil parish was served by Crewe and Nantwich Borough Council, which was succeeded on 1 April 2009 by the new unitary authority of Cheshire East. Stapeley falls in the parliamentary constituency of Crewe and Nantwich, which has been represented by Kieran Mullan since 2019, after being represented by Laura Smith (2017–19), Edward Timpson (2008–17) and Gwyneth Dunwoody (1983–2008).

Stapeley was formerly a township in the parish of Wybunbury, from 1866 Stapeley was a civil parish in its own right, on 1 April 2023 the parish was abolished and merged with Batherton to form "Stapeley and District".

== Geography and transport ==
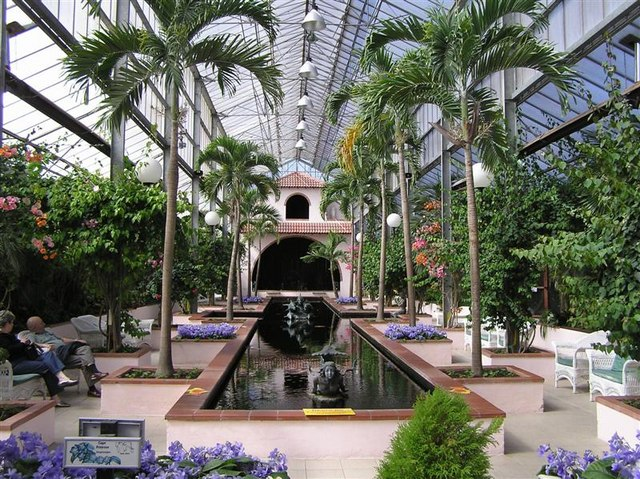
Palms Tropical Oasis at Stapeley Water Gardens in 2006

The civil parish has a total area of 1,247 acres (505 ha). The terrain is predominantly flat, with an average elevation of around 50 metres. To the north of the A5301 is residential, adjacent to the south-east part of the town of Nantwich. The remainder of the civil parish is predominantly rural, with the major land use being agricultural. Howbeck Brook forms part of the southern boundary of the parish; several unnamed brooks run through the parish, and there are many scattered small meres and ponds. The parish contains a few small areas of woodland, including Drivers Copse.

Three major A roads serve the parish: the A51 (London Road) runs north–south, the A529 (Broad Lane) forms part of the western boundary, and the A500 runs through the north of the parish on or near the boundary, meeting the A51 on the edge of the town of Nantwich. Additionally, the A5301 (Peter Destapleigh Way) runs east–west through the north of the parish, connecting the A51 and the A529. Two lanes run from the A51 towards Wybunbury: Wybunbury Lane runs eastwards at Butt Green, while Annions Lane runs northwards along the eastern parish boundary near Howbeck Bank. First and Second Dig Lanes both run broadly east–west, connecting the A51 and the A529; Stapeley village is located around Second Dig Lane.

The Welsh Marches Railway forms part of the northern boundary of the parish; the nearest station is Nantwich. The Crewe and Nantwich Circular Walk runs east–west through the parish, in part following First Dig Lane.

== Demography ==
The population of the civil parish has grown rapidly over the past decade, largely due to the development of the Cronkinson Farm Estate in the north of the parish. In 2005, Cheshire County Council estimated the civil parish had a population of 2410, while Stapeley and District Council estimated that this had increased to 3000 in 2008. The parish had a population of 1048, in 413 households, in the 2001 census. The 2008 estimate represents an almost sixfold increase over the population in 1951; the historical population figures were 249 (1801), 462 (1851), 686 (1901) and 513 (1951).

== Landmarks ==
Stapeley House is a small country house on London Road (at SJ670505) which was formerly the seat of the Folliott family; it is listed at grade II. Dating originally from 1778, it has three storeys and five bays in red brick. It was altered in the late 1840s by Anthony Salvin, who added a classical stone frontispiece and canted bay windows, and also laid out the gardens. It has now been converted into offices. Another grade-II-listed building on London Road is Stapeley Old Hall (SJ674502), a late Georgian house in stuccoed brick, dating from the early 19th century. It features a large central semi-circular bow with a conical roof around the main entrance.

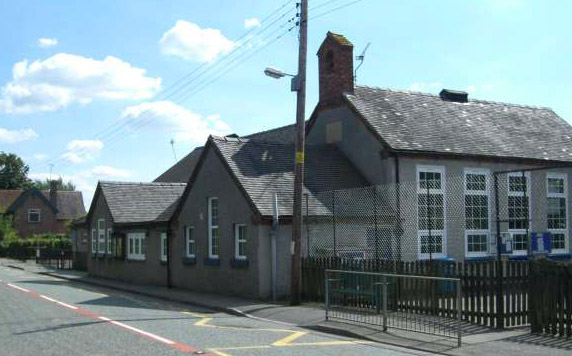
Stapeley Broad Lane School

Two timber-framed farmhouses are listed at grade II: Yewtree Farmhouse on Annions Lane (SJ681501) dates from the late 16th or early 17th century, and Haymoorgreen Farmhouse on Wybunbury Lane (SJ679508) dates from before 1626; both properties are unusual in retaining one or more wattle and daub panels. Manor Farmhouse on Newcastle Road (SJ675517) dates from the early 18th century, and Oakfield on Stapeley Road (SJ675498) dates from the late 18th or early 19th century; both buildings are in orange brick and are listed at grade II.

Stapeley Grange Wildlife Hospital is on London Road near First Dig Lane.

== Education ==
Two primary schools are located within the civil parish. Pear Tree Primary School (SJ661515) serves the northern area of the parish. Stapeley Broad Lane Church of England Primary School (at SJ663504, on the boundary with Batherton) serves the remainder of the parish of Stapeley, together with Batherton and Hatherton. The parish falls within the catchment area of Brine Leas High School in Nantwich.

== See also ==
- Listed buildings in Stapeley
