= List of United Kingdom locations: Gree-Gz =

The United Kingdom

This is part of the list of United Kingdom locations: a gazetteer of place names in the United Kingdom showing each place's locality and geographical coordinates.

== Gr (continued) ==
=== Gre (continued) ===
==== Green ====
Location	Locality	Coordinates (links to map & photo sources)	OS grid reference
Green	Powys	52.53°N 03.09°W	SO2694
Green	Pembrokeshire	51.67°N 04.92°W	SM9801
Green	Denbighshire	53.20°N 03.42°W	SJ0568
Greenacres	Oldham	53.54°N 02.09°W	SD9405
Greenbank	Shetland Islands	60.70°N 01.03°W	HP5303
Green Bank	Cumbria	54.21°N 02.95°W	SD3880
Greenbank	Cheshire	53.24°N 02.54°W	SJ6472
Greenbank	Falkirk	55.99°N 03.82°W	NS8679
Green Bottom	Cornwall	50.26°N 05.14°W	SW7645
Green Bottom	Gloucestershire	51.83°N 02.48°W	SO6715
Greenburn	West Lothian	55.82°N 03.70°W	NS9360
Green Close	North Yorkshire	54.11°N 02.42°W	SD7269
Green Clough	Bradford	53.78°N 01.88°W	SE0832
Green Crize	Herefordshire	52.02°N 02.71°W	SO5137
Greencroft	Durham	54.85°N 01.75°W	NZ1651
Green Cross	Surrey	51.13°N 00.77°W	SU8638
Greendale	Cheshire	53.29°N 02.18°W	SJ8877
Green Down	Devon	50.81°N 03.02°W	ST2802
Greendown	Somerset	51.27°N 02.61°W	ST5753
Greendykes	Northumberland	55.54°N 01.90°W	NU0628
Green End (Maulden)	Bedfordshire	52.03°N 00.45°W	TL0638
Green End (Pertenhall)	Bedfordshire	52.26°N 00.43°W	TL0764
Green End (Great Barford)	Bedfordshire	52.15°N 00.36°W	TL1252
Green End (Kempston)	Bedfordshire	52.11°N 00.52°W	TL0147
Green End (Little Staughton)	Bedfordshire	52.25°N 00.38°W	TL1063
Green End (Great Brickhill)	Buckinghamshire	51.96°N 00.69°W	SP9030
Green End (Wycombe)	Buckinghamshire	51.64°N 00.84°W	SU8095
Green End (Great Stukeley)	Cambridgeshire	52.35°N 00.21°W	TL2274
Green End (Comberton)	Cambridgeshire	52.18°N 00.01°E	TL3856
Green End (Sandon)	Hertfordshire	51.98°N 00.07°W	TL3233
Green End (Weston)	Hertfordshire	51.95°N 00.16°W	TL2630
Green End (Little Munden)	Hertfordshire	51.88°N 00.06°W	TL3322
Green End (Braughing)	Hertfordshire	51.90°N 00.01°E	TL3925
Green End (Hemel Hempstead)	Hertfordshire	51.74°N 00.49°W	TL0406
Green End	Lancashire	53.91°N 02.15°W	SD9046
Green End	North Yorkshire	54.41°N 00.73°W	NZ8203
Green End	Warwickshire	52.47°N 01.61°W	SP2686
Greenend	North Lanarkshire	55.85°N 04.01°W	NS7464
Greenend	Oxfordshire	51.88°N 01.53°W	SP3221
Greenfaulds	North Lanarkshire	55.93°N 04.00°W	NS7573
Greenfield	Bedfordshire	51.99°N 00.47°W	TL0534
Greenfield	Oxfordshire	51.61°N 00.97°W	SU7191
Greenfield	Flintshire	53.28°N 03.21°W	SJ1977
Greenfield	Oldham	53.53°N 02.01°W	SD9904
Greenfield	City of Glasgow	55.85°N 04.17°W	NS6464
Greenfold	Moray	57.53°N 02.66°W	NJ6049
Greenfoot	North Lanarkshire	55.89°N 04.03°W	NS7369
Greenford	Ealing	51.52°N 00.37°W	TQ1382
Greengairs	North Lanarkshire	55.90°N 03.95°W	NS7870
Greengarth Hall	Cumbria	54.38°N 03.43°W	NY0700
Green Gate	Devon	50.92°N 03.41°W	ST0115
Greengate	Rochdale	53.63°N 02.13°W	SD9115
Greengate	Norfolk	52.70°N 00.97°E	TG0116
Greengates	Bradford	53.82°N 01.71°W	SE1936
Greengill	Cumbria	54.72°N 03.39°W	NY1037
Green Hailey	Buckinghamshire	51.71°N 00.81°W	SP8203
Greenhalgh	Lancashire	53.80°N 02.91°W	SD4035
Greenhall	South Lanarkshire	55.77°N 04.13°W	NS6656
Greenham	Somerset	50.97°N 03.32°W	ST0720
Greenham	Dorset	50.83°N 02.85°W	ST4004
Greenham	Berkshire	51.38°N 01.31°W	SU4865
Green Hammerton	North Yorkshire	53.99°N 01.31°W	SE4556
Greenhaugh	Northumberland	55.17°N 02.33°W	NY7987
Green Haworth	Lancashire	53.73°N 02.38°W	SD7526
Greenhead	Northumberland	54.97°N 02.53°W	NY6665
Green Head	Cumbria	54.83°N 02.99°W	NY3649
Greenhead	Scottish Borders	55.55°N 02.81°W	NT4929
Greenhead	Staffordshire	53.01°N 02.03°W	SJ9846
Greenhead	North Lanarkshire	55.76°N 03.91°W	NS8054
Green Heath	Staffordshire	52.71°N 02.01°W	SJ9913
Greenheys	Salford	53.53°N 02.45°W	SD7004
Greenhill	Herefordshire	52.12°N 02.42°W	SO7148
Greenhill (Evesham)	Worcestershire	52.10°N 01.94°W	SP0445
Greenhill (Kidderminster)	Worcestershire	52.39°N 02.23°W	SO8477
Green Hill	Wiltshire	51.57°N 01.91°W	SU0686
Greenhill	Harrow	51.57°N 00.34°W	TQ1588
Green Hill	Kent	51.25°N 00.56°E	TQ7954
Greenhill	Kent	51.35°N 01.10°E	TR1666
Greenhill	Durham	54.81°N 01.39°W	NZ3947
Greenhill	Dumfries and Galloway	55.09°N 03.41°W	NY1079
Green Hill	Leeds	53.82°N 01.34°W	SE4337
Greenhill	Sheffield	53.32°N 01.49°W	SK3481
Greenhill	Leicestershire	52.71°N 01.35°W	SK4413
Greenhill	Falkirk	55.98°N 03.89°W	NS8278
Greenhill	City of Edinburgh	55.56°N 03.12°W	NT245718
Greenhill Bank	Shropshire	52.91°N 02.93°W	SJ3736
Greenhill Lane	Derbyshire	53.07°N 01.37°W	SK4252
Greenhillocks	Derbyshire	53.03°N 01.40°W	SK4049
Greenhills	South Lanarkshire	55.74°N 04.19°W	NS6252
Greenhithe	Kent	51.45°N 00.27°E	TQ5875
Greenholm	East Ayrshire	55.60°N 04.33°W	NS5337
Greenholme	Cumbria	54.43°N 02.63°W	NY5905
Greenhow Hill	North Yorkshire	54.07°N 01.83°W	SE1164
Greenigo	Orkney Islands	58.94°N 03.04°W	HY4007
Greenland	Sheffield	53.38°N 01.41°W	SK3988
Greenland Mains	Highland	58.58°N 03.30°W	ND2467
Greenlands	Buckinghamshire	51.55°N 00.89°W	SU7785
Greenlands	Worcestershire	52.28°N 01.92°W	SP0565
Green Lane	Devon	50.58°N 03.72°W	SX7877
Green Lane	West Midlands	52.37°N 01.53°W	SP3275
Green Lane	Worcestershire	52.27°N 01.91°W	SP0664
Green Lane	Herefordshire	52.10°N 02.55°W	SO6245
Greenlaw	Scottish Borders	55.70°N 02.46°W	NT7146
Greenlaw Mains	Midlothian	55.83°N 03.21°W	NT2461
Greenlea	Dumfries and Galloway	55.06°N 03.52°W	NY0375
Greenleys	Milton Keynes	52.05°N 00.83°W	SP8040
Greenloaning	Perth and Kinross	56.24°N 03.88°W	NN8307
Greenlooms	Cheshire	53.16°N 02.79°W	SJ4763
Greenman's Lane	Wiltshire	51.52°N 02.01°W	ST9981
Greenmeadow	Swindon	51.58°N 01.79°W	SU1487
Greenmeadow	Torfaen	51.64°N 03.05°W	ST2795
Green Moor	Barnsley	53.48°N 01.57°W	SK2899
Greenmount	Bury	53.62°N 02.34°W	SD7714
Greenmow	Shetland Islands	60.03°N 01.21°W	HU4428
Greenness	Aberdeenshire	57.51°N 02.36°W	NJ7847
Greenoak	East Riding of Yorkshire	53.73°N 00.77°W	SE8127
Greenock	Inverclyde	55.94°N 04.77°W	NS2776
Greenock West	Inverclyde	55.94°N 04.78°W	NS2676
Greenodd	Cumbria	54.22°N 03.06°W	SD3182
Green Ore	Somerset	51.24°N 02.61°W	ST5750
Green Parlour	Somerset	51.28°N 02.43°W	ST7054
Green Quarter	Cumbria	54.42°N 02.83°W	NY4604
Greenrigg	West Lothian	55.85°N 03.74°W	NS9164
Greenrow	Cumbria	54.85°N 03.40°W	NY1052
Greens	Aberdeenshire	57.50°N 02.28°W	NJ8346
Greens	Scottish Borders	55.16°N 02.81°W	NY4886
Greensforge	Staffordshire	52.49°N 02.22°W	SO8588
Greensgate	Norfolk	52.69°N 01.10°E	TG1015
Greenside	Cumbria	54.43°N 02.44°W	NY7104
Greenside	Derbyshire	53.30°N 01.41°W	SK3979
Greenside	Gateshead	54.95°N 01.78°W	NZ1462
Greenside	Kirklees	53.64°N 01.74°W	SE1716
Greenside	Tameside	53.48°N 02.15°W	SJ9099
Green Side	Kirklees	53.59°N 01.74°W	SE1711
Green Side	Leeds	53.78°N 01.59°W	SE2732
Greens Norton	Northamptonshire	52.13°N 01.03°W	SP6649
Greens of Coxton	Moray	57.62°N 03.25°W	NJ2560
Greens of Gardyne	Angus	56.64°N 02.70°W	NO5751
Greensplat	Cornwall	50.36°N 04.82°W	SW9955
Greenstead	Essex	51.88°N 00.93°E	TM0225
Greenstead Green	Essex	51.92°N 00.64°E	TL8228
Greensted	Essex	51.69°N 00.21°E	TL5302
Greensted Green	Essex	51.70°N 00.19°E	TL5203
Green Street	East Sussex	50.87°N 00.50°E	TQ7611
Green Street	Essex	51.66°N 00.34°E	TQ6299
Green Street (Brockworth)	Gloucestershire	51.83°N 02.16°W	SO8915
Green Street (Cam)	Gloucestershire	51.69°N 02.34°W	SO7600
Green Street (Little Hadham)	Hertfordshire	51.87°N 00.10°E	TL4522
Green Street (Borehamwood)	Hertfordshire	51.66°N 00.28°W	TQ1998
Green Street	West Sussex	50.98°N 00.37°W	TQ1422
Green Street (Ryall)	Worcestershire	52.05°N 02.19°W	SO8740
Green Street (Kempsey)	Worcestershire	52.13°N 02.20°W	SO8649
Greenstreet Green	Suffolk	52.10°N 00.97°E	TM0449
Green Street Green	Kent	51.40°N 00.27°E	TQ5870
Green Street Green	Bromley	51.34°N 00.08°E	TQ4563
Green Tye	Hertfordshire	51.84°N 00.08°E	TL4418
Greenway	Somerset	51.04°N 03.19°W	ST1628
Greenway	Worcestershire	52.32°N 02.38°W	SO7470
Greenway	Gloucestershire	51.99°N 02.43°W	SO7033
Greenway	The Vale Of Glamorgan	51.45°N 03.36°W	ST0574
Greenwell	Cumbria	54.89°N 02.73°W	NY5356
Greenwells	Scottish Borders	55.57°N 02.69°W	NT5631
Greenwich	Greenwich	51.47°N 00.00°E	TQ3977
Greenwich Millennium Village	Greenwich	51.495°N 00.014°E	TQ398793
Greenwich Peninsula	Greenwich	51.498°N 00.004°E	TQ391797
Greenwich	Suffolk	52.03°N 01.16°E	TM1742
Greenwich	Wiltshire	51.08°N 02.11°W	ST9232
Greenwith Common	Cornwall	50.21°N 05.12°W	SW7740
Greenwoods	Essex	51.66°N 00.44°E	TQ6999
Greeny	Orkney Islands	59.07°N 03.25°W	HY2822

==== Greep-Grew ====
Location	Locality	Coordinates (links to map & photo sources)	OS grid reference
Greep	Highland	57.38°N 06.56°W	NG2642
Greet	Gloucestershire	51.96°N 01.97°W	SP0230
Greet	Kent	51.26°N 00.75°E	TQ9255
Greete	Shropshire	52.335°N 02.625°W	SO5770
Greetham	Lincolnshire	53.21°N 00.05°W	TF3070
Greetham	Rutland	52.71°N 00.63°W	SK9214
Greetland	Calderdale	53.68°N 01.88°W	SE0821
Greetland Wall Nook	Calderdale	53.68°N 01.91°W	SE0621
Greetwell	North Lincolnshire	53.52°N 00.58°W	SE9404
Gregson Lane	Lancashire	53.72°N 02.62°W	SD5926
Gregynog	Powys	52.56°N 03.35°W	SO0897
Greian Head	Western Isles	57.01°N 07.51°W	NF657047
Greinton	Somerset	51.12°N 02.84°W	ST4136
Grendon	Northamptonshire	52.23°N 00.72°W	SP8760
Grendon (New Grendon)	Warwickshire	52.58°N 01.60°W	SP2799
Grendon (Old Grendon)	Warwickshire	52.59°N 01.58°W	SK2800
Grendon Bishop	Herefordshire	52.20°N 02.60°W	SO5956
Grendon Common	Warwickshire	52.57°N 01.60°W	SP2798
Grendon Green	Herefordshire	52.20°N 02.60°W	SO5957
Grendon Underwood	Buckinghamshire	51.87°N 01.01°W	SP6820
Grenitote	Western Isles	57.65°N 07.33°W	NF8275
Grenofen	Devon	50.51°N 04.13°W	SX4971
Grenoside	Sheffield	53.43°N 01.50°W	SK3393
Greosabhagh	Western Isles	57.82°N 06.80°W	NG1592
Gresford	Wrexham	53.07°N 02.97°W	SJ3554
Gresham	Norfolk	52.89°N 01.21°E	TG1638
Gressenhall	Norfolk	52.70°N 00.90°E	TF9616
Gressingham	Lancashire	54.11°N 02.65°W	SD5769
Greta Bridge	Durham	54.51°N 01.87°W	NZ0813
Gretna	Dumfries and Galloway	54.99°N 03.08°W	NY3167
Gretna Green	Dumfries and Galloway	55.00°N 03.08°W	NY3168
Gretton	Northamptonshire	52.53°N 00.68°W	SP8994
Gretton	Shropshire	52.55°N 02.72°W	SO5195
Gretton	Gloucestershire	51.96°N 02.00°W	SP0030
Gretton Fields	Gloucestershire	51.97°N 02.00°W	SP0031
Grewelthorpe	North Yorkshire	54.17°N 01.64°W	SE2376

==== Grey ====
Location	Locality	Coordinates (links to map & photo sources)	OS grid reference
Greyfield	Bath and North East Somerset	51.32°N 02.51°W	ST6458
Greygarth	North Yorkshire	54.14°N 01.72°W	SE1872
Grey Green	North Lincolnshire	53.55°N 00.82°W	SE7807
Greylake	Somerset	51.09°N 02.88°W	ST3833
Greylake Fosse	Somerset	51.11°N 02.85°W	ST4035
Greynor	Carmarthenshire	51.76°N 04.04°W	SN5909
Greys Green	Oxfordshire	51.53°N 00.96°W	SU7282
Greysouthen	Cumbria	54.64°N 03.44°W	NY0729
Greystead	Northumberland	55.15°N 02.36°W	NY7785
Greystoke	Cumbria	54.66°N 02.86°W	NY4430
Greystoke Gill	Cumbria	54.65°N 02.86°W	NY4429
Greystone	Cumbria	54.20°N 02.75°W	SD5179
Greystone	Angus	56.57°N 02.76°W	NO5343
Greystonegill	North Yorkshire	54.11°N 02.49°W	SD6869
Greystones	Worcestershire	52.13°N 01.86°W	SP0949
Greystones	Sheffield	53.36°N 01.52°W	SK3285
Greytree	Herefordshire	51.92°N 02.59°W	SO5925
Greywell	Hampshire	51.25°N 00.98°W	SU7151

=== Gri ===
Location	Locality	Coordinates (links to map & photo sources)	OS grid reference
Grianan	Western Isles	58.22°N 06.41°W	NB4135
Gribb	Dorset	50.82°N 02.89°W	ST3703
Gribbin Head	Cornwall	50.31°N 04.67°W	SX099497
Gribthorpe	East Riding of Yorkshire	53.81°N 00.84°W	SE7635
Gribun	Argyll and Bute	56.42°N 06.13°W	NM4534
Griff	Warwickshire	52.48°N 01.48°W	SP3588
Griffins Hill	Birmingham	52.42°N 01.95°W	SP0381
Griffithstown	Torfaen	51.68°N 03.02°W	ST2999
Griffydam	Leicestershire	52.75°N 01.39°W	SK4118
Grif Skerry	Shetland Islands	60.34°N 00.86°W	HU629622
Grigg	Kent	51.16°N 00.64°E	TQ8544
Grigg's Cross	Bromley	51.383°N 00.120°E	TQ476670
Griggs Green	Hampshire	51.07°N 00.83°W	SU8231
Grillis	Cornwall	50.19°N 05.26°W	SW6738
Grilstone	Devon	51.00°N 03.81°W	SS7324
Grimbister	Orkney Islands	58.99°N 03.09°W	HY3712
Grimeford Village	Bolton	53.60°N 02.59°W	SD6112
Grimes Hill	Worcestershire	52.37°N 01.88°W	SP0875
Grimesthorpe	Sheffield	53.40°N 01.45°W	SK3690
Grimeston	Orkney Islands	59.00°N 03.20°W	HY3114
Grimethorpe	Barnsley	53.57°N 01.38°W	SE4109
Griminis	Western Isles	57.43°N 07.38°W	NF7751
Griminish Point	Western Isles	57.65°N 07.48°W	NF731760
Grimister	Shetland Islands	60.61°N 01.16°W	HU4693
Grimley	Worcestershire	52.23°N 02.25°W	SO8360
Grimoldby	Lincolnshire	53.37°N 00.08°E	TF3988
Grimpo	Shropshire	52.82°N 02.95°W	SJ3626
Grimsargh	Lancashire	53.80°N 02.63°W	SD5834
Grimsay	Western Isles	57.48°N 07.23°W	NF866562
Grimsbury	Oxfordshire	52.05°N 01.33°W	SP4640
Grimsby	North East Lincolnshire	53.56°N 00.08°W	TA2709
Grimscote	Northamptonshire	52.17°N 01.05°W	SP6553
Grimscott	Cornwall	50.82°N 04.47°W	SS2606
Grimshaw	Lancashire	53.71°N 02.45°W	SD7024
Grimshaw Green	Lancashire	53.60°N 02.78°W	SD4812
Grimsthorpe	Lincolnshire	52.79°N 00.45°W	TF0423
Grimston	East Riding of Yorkshire	53.79°N 00.05°W	TA2835
Grimston	Leicestershire	52.78°N 00.99°W	SK6821
Grimston	Norfolk	52.76°N 00.53°E	TF7122
Grimston	York	53.95°N 01.02°W	SE6451
Grimstone	Dorset	50.74°N 02.51°W	SY6494
Grimstone End	Suffolk	52.28°N 00.82°E	TL9369
Grinacombe Moor	Devon	50.69°N 04.25°W	SX4191
Grindale	East Riding of Yorkshire	54.12°N 00.27°W	TA1371
Grindiscol	Shetland Islands	60.13°N 01.11°W	HU4939
Grindle	Shropshire	52.62°N 02.37°W	SJ7503
Grindleford	Derbyshire	53.28°N 01.64°W	SK2477
Grindleton	Lancashire	53.90°N 02.38°W	SD7545
Grindley	Staffordshire	52.85°N 01.95°W	SK0329
Grindley Brook	Shropshire	52.97°N 02.71°W	SJ5242
Grindlow	Derbyshire	53.29°N 01.73°W	SK1877
Grindon	Stockton-on-Tees	54.61°N 01.39°W	NZ3925
Grindon	Sunderland	54.88°N 01.45°W	NZ3554
Grindon	Northumberland	55.68°N 02.14°W	NT9144
Grindon	Staffordshire	53.08°N 01.88°W	SK0854
Grindsbrook Booth	Derbyshire	53.37°N 01.82°W	SK1286
Gringley on the Hill	Nottinghamshire	53.40°N 00.90°W	SK7390
Grinsdale	Cumbria	54.91°N 02.99°W	NY3658
Grinshill	Shropshire	52.80°N 02.71°W	SJ5223
Grinstead Hill	Suffolk	52.14°N 01.05°E	TM0954
Grinton	North Yorkshire	54.37°N 01.93°W	SE0498
Griomasaigh	Western Isles	57.40°N 07.28°W	NF8347
Griomsidar	Western Isles	58.13°N 06.41°W	NB4025
Grisedale / Grisdale	Cumbria	54.33°N 02.35°W	SD7793
Grishipoll	Argyll and Bute	56.63°N 06.58°W	NM1959
Grisling Common	East Sussex	50.97°N 00.03°E	TQ4321
Gristhorpe	North Yorkshire	54.22°N 00.34°W	TA0882
Griston	Norfolk	52.55°N 00.86°E	TL9499
Grittlesend	Herefordshire	52.13°N 02.41°W	SO7249
Grittleton	Wiltshire	51.51°N 02.21°W	ST8580
Grizebeck	Cumbria	54.25°N 03.18°W	SD2385
Grizedale	Cumbria	54.33°N 03.03°W	SD3394

=== Gro ===
Location	Locality	Coordinates (links to map & photo sources)	OS grid reference
Groay	Western Isles	57.70°N 07.03°W	NG001791
Grobister	Orkney Islands	59.10°N 02.61°W	HY6524
Grobsness	Shetland Islands	60.35°N 01.33°W	HU3763
Groby	Leicestershire	52.65°N 01.23°W	SK5207
Groes	Conwy	53.16°N 03.49°W	SJ0064
Groes Efa	Denbighshire	53.17°N 03.33°W	SJ1165
Groes-faen	Rhondda, Cynon, Taff	51.52°N 03.35°W	ST0681
Groes-fawr	Denbighshire	53.17°N 03.31°W	SJ1265
Groesffordd	Powys	51.94°N 03.35°W	SO0728
Groesffordd	Gwynedd	52.92°N 04.57°W	SH2739
Groeslon (Waunfawr)	Gwynedd	53.11°N 04.21°W	SH5260
Groeslon (Llandwrog)	Gwynedd	53.07°N 04.28°W	SH4755
Groes-lwyd	Monmouthshire	51.89°N 02.98°W	SO3222
Groes-lwyd	Powys	52.69°N 03.17°W	SJ2111
Groespluan	Powys	52.66°N 03.16°W	SJ2108
Groes-wen	Rhondda, Cynon, Taff	51.56°N 03.27°W	ST1286
Grogport	Argyll and Bute	55.64°N 05.49°W	NR8044
Gromford	Suffolk	52.16°N 01.47°E	TM3858
Gronant	Flintshire	53.33°N 03.36°W	SJ0983
Gronwen	Shropshire	52.82°N 03.08°W	SJ2726
Groombridge	East Sussex	51.10°N 00.18°E	TQ5336
Grosmont	Monmouthshire	51.91°N 02.87°W	SO4024
Grosmont	North Yorkshire	54.43°N 00.73°W	NZ8205
Gross Green	Warwickshire	52.21°N 01.44°W	SP3857
Groton	Suffolk	52.03°N 00.84°E	TL9541
Grotton	Oldham	53.53°N 02.06°W	SD9604
Grove	Dorset	50.54°N 02.43°W	SY6972
Grove	Herefordshire	52.09°N 02.57°W	SO6144
Grove	Buckinghamshire	51.88°N 00.67°W	SP9122
Grove	Oxfordshire	51.60°N 01.42°W	SU4090
Grove	Pembrokeshire	51.66°N 04.92°W	SM9800
Grove	Kent	51.30°N 01.19°E	TR2361
Grove	Nottinghamshire	53.30°N 00.90°W	SK7379
Grove End	Birmingham	52.55°N 01.76°W	SP1695
Grove End	Warwickshire	52.04°N 01.56°W	SP3039
Grove End	Kent	51.31°N 00.71°E	TQ8961
Grove Green	Kent	51.27°N 00.55°E	TQ7856
Grove Hill	East Sussex	50.90°N 00.27°E	TQ6014
Grove Hill	Kent	51.29°N 01.19°E	TR2360
Grovehill	Hertfordshire	51.76°N 00.46°W	TL0609
Grovehill	East Riding of Yorkshire	53.83°N 00.42°W	TA0439
Grove Park	Hounslow	51.47°N 00.27°W	TQ2077
Grove Park	Lewisham	51.42°N 00.02°E	TQ4172
Groves	Kent	51.26°N 01.23°E	TR2657
Grovesend	Swansea	51.68°N 04.04°W	SN5900
Grove Town	Wakefield	53.68°N 01.30°W	SE4621
Grove Vale	Sandwell	52.54°N 01.95°W	SP0394

=== Gru ===
Location	Locality	Coordinates (links to map & photo sources)	OS grid reference
Grubb Street	Kent	51.39°N 00.27°E	TQ5869
Grub Street	Staffordshire	52.82°N 02.32°W	SJ7825
Grudie	Highland	57.61°N 04.84°W	NH3062
Gruids	Highland	58.00°N 04.43°W	NC5604
Gruinard Island	Highland	57.88°N 05.47°W	NG944937
Gruline	Argyll and Bute	56.48°N 05.99°W	NM5440
Grumbla	Cornwall	50.10°N 05.63°W	SW4029
Grunay	Shetland Islands	60.42°N 00.74°W	HU694714
Grundisburgh	Suffolk	52.10°N 01.24°E	TM2250
Grundsound	Shetland Islands	60.08°N 01.33°W	HU3733
Gruney	Shetland Islands	60.65°N 01.31°W	HU378965
Grunsagill	Lancashire	53.98°N 02.33°W	SD7854
Gruting	Shetland Islands	60.22°N 01.49°W	HU2849
Grutness	Shetland Islands	59.86°N 01.28°W	HU4009

== Gu ==
Location	Locality	Coordinates (links to map & photo sources)	OS grid reference
Gualan	Western Isles	57.40°N 07.36°W	NF777475
Guardbridge	Fife	56.36°N 02.89°W	NO4519
Guard House	Bradford	53.86°N 01.94°W	SE0441
Guarlford	Worcestershire	52.10°N 02.27°W	SO8145
Guay	Perth and Kinross	56.62°N 03.64°W	NN9949
Gubbion's Green	Essex	51.82°N 00.50°E	TL7317
Gubblecote	Hertfordshire	51.81°N 00.69°W	SP9014
Guestling Green	East Sussex	50.88°N 00.62°E	TQ8513
Guestling Thorn	East Sussex	50.90°N 00.63°E	TQ8515
Guestwick	Norfolk	52.80°N 01.05°E	TG0627
Guestwick Green	Norfolk	52.79°N 01.03°E	TG0526
Gugh	Isles of Scilly	49.89°N 06.32°W	SV893082
Guide	Lancashire	53.72°N 02.45°W	SD7025
Guide Bridge	Tameside	53.47°N 02.12°W	SJ9298
Guide Post	Northumberland	55.15°N 01.60°W	NZ2585
Guilden Morden	Cambridgeshire	52.07°N 00.14°W	TL2743
Guilden Sutton	Cheshire	53.20°N 02.83°W	SJ4468
Guildford	Surrey	51.23°N 00.58°W	SU9949
Guildford Park	Surrey	51.23°N 00.59°W	SU9849
Guildiehaugh	West Lothian	55.88°N 03.63°W	NS9867
Guildtown	Perth and Kinross	56.46°N 03.41°W	NO1331
Guildy	Angus	56.54°N 02.78°W	NO5239
Guilford	Pembrokeshire	51.74°N 04.91°W	SM9909
Guilsborough	Northamptonshire	52.35°N 01.01°W	SP6773
Guilsfield (Cegidfa)	Powys	52.69°N 03.15°W	SJ2211
Guilthwaite	Rotherham	53.39°N 01.32°W	SK4589
Guilton	Kent	51.27°N 01.26°E	TR2858
Guineaford	Devon	51.11°N 04.08°W	SS5437
Guisborough	Redcar and Cleveland	54.52°N 01.05°W	NZ6115
Guiseley	Leeds	53.87°N 01.71°W	SE1942
Guist	Norfolk	52.78°N 00.94°E	TF9925
Guith	Orkney Islands	59.20°N 02.78°W	HY5536
Guiting Power	Gloucestershire	51.91°N 01.87°W	SP0924
Gulberwick	Shetland Islands	60.12°N 01.22°W	HU4338
Gullane	East Lothian	56.02°N 02.83°W	NT4882
Guller's End	Worcestershire	52.01°N 02.21°W	SO8535
Gulling Green	Suffolk	52.17°N 00.66°E	TL8256
Gullom Holme	Cumbria	54.64°N 02.54°W	NY6528
Gulval	Cornwall	50.12°N 05.52°W	SW4831
Gulworthy	Devon	50.52°N 04.20°W	SX4472
Gumfreston	Pembrokeshire	51.67°N 04.74°W	SN1001
Gumley	Leicestershire	52.50°N 00.99°W	SP6890
Gummow's Shop	Cornwall	50.37°N 05.01°W	SW8657
Gunby	East Riding of Yorkshire	53.81°N 00.92°W	SE709353
Gunby (East Lindsey)	Lincolnshire	53.17°N 00.18°E	TF4666
Gunby (South Kesteven)	Lincolnshire	52.77°N 00.65°W	SK9121
Gundenham	Somerset	50.99°N 03.25°W	ST1222
Gundleton	Hampshire	51.09°N 01.13°W	SU6133
Gun Green	Kent	51.04°N 00.52°E	TQ7730
Gun Hill	East Sussex	50.90°N 00.21°E	TQ5614
Gunn	Devon	51.08°N 03.95°W	SS6333
Gunna	Argyll and Bute	56.56°N 06.72°W	NM100510
Gunnersbury	Hounslow	51.48°N 00.28°W	TQ1978
Gunnerside	North Yorkshire	54.37°N 02.07°W	SD9598
Gunnerton	Northumberland	55.06°N 02.15°W	NY9075
Gunness	North Lincolnshire	53.58°N 00.73°W	SE8411
Gunnislake	Cornwall	50.51°N 04.21°W	SX4371
Gunnista	Shetland Islands	60.16°N 01.10°W	HU5043
Gunstone	Staffordshire	52.63°N 02.19°W	SJ8704
Guns Village	Sandwell	52.51°N 02.01°W	SO9991
Gunter's Bridge	West Sussex	50.99°N 00.61°W	SU9723
Gunthorpe	Lincolnshire	53.45°N 00.79°W	SK8096
Gunthorpe	Nottinghamshire	52.98°N 00.98°W	SK6844
Gunthorpe	Norfolk	52.86°N 00.98°E	TG0134
Gunthorpe	Rutland	52.63°N 00.73°W	SK8605
Gunthorpe	Cambridgeshire	52.60°N 00.25°W	TF1802
Gunton	Suffolk	52.49°N 01.74°E	TM5495
Gunville	Isle of Wight	50.69°N 01.33°W	SZ4789
Gunwalloe	Cornwall	50.05°N 05.28°W	SW6522
Gunwalloe Fishing Cove	Cornwall	50.05°N 05.28°W	SW6522
Gupworthy	Somerset	51.10°N 03.48°W	SS9635
Gurnard	Isle of Wight	50.75°N 01.33°W	SZ4795
Gurnard's Head	Cornwall	50.19°N 05.59°W	SW435384
Gurnett	Cheshire	53.23°N 02.12°W	SJ9271
Gurney Slade	Somerset	51.23°N 02.54°W	ST6249
Gurnos	Neath Port Talbot	51.76°N 03.78°W	SN7709
Gurnos	Merthyr Tydfil	51.75°N 03.39°W	SO0407
Gushmere	Kent	51.27°N 00.92°E	TR0457
Gussage All Saints	Dorset	50.88°N 02.00°W	SU0010
Gussage St Andrew	Dorset	50.92°N 02.04°W	ST9714
Gussage St Michael	Dorset	50.89°N 02.02°W	ST9811
Gustard Wood	Hertfordshire	51.83°N 00.30°W	TL1716
Guston	Kent	51.14°N 01.31°E	TR3244
Gutcher	Shetland Islands	60.67°N 01.01°W	HU5499
Guthram Gowt	Lincolnshire	52.78°N 00.26°W	TF1722
Guthrie	Angus	56.64°N 02.71°W	NO5650
Guyhirn	Cambridgeshire	52.60°N 00.06°E	TF4003
Guyhirn Gull	Cambridgeshire	52.61°N 00.05°E	TF3904
Guy's Cliffe	Warwickshire	52.29°N 01.59°W	SP2866
Guy's Head	Lincolnshire	52.80°N 00.19°E	TF4825
Guy's Marsh	Dorset	50.97°N 02.22°W	ST8420
Guyzance	Northumberland	55.32°N 01.67°W	NU2103

== Gw ==
Location	Locality	Coordinates (links to map & photo sources)	OS grid reference
Gwaelod-y-garth	Cardiff	51.53°N 03.28°W	ST1183
Gwaenysgor	Flintshire	53.31°N 03.39°W	SJ0781
Gwalchmai	Isle of Anglesey	53.24°N 04.41°W	SH3975
Gwalchmai Uchaf	Isle of Anglesey	53.24°N 04.41°W	SH3975
Gwallon	Cornwall	50.12°N 05.47°W	SW5231
Gwastad	Pembrokeshire	51.88°N 04.84°W	SN0424
Gwastadgoed	Gwynedd	52.66°N 04.08°W	SH5910
Gwastadnant	Gwynedd	53.09°N 04.07°W	SH6157
Gwaun-Cae-Gurwen	Carmarthenshire	51.78°N 03.88°W	SN7011
Gwaun-Leision	Carmarthenshire	51.79°N 03.88°W	SN7012
Gwavas (Newlyn)	Cornwall	49.97°N 05.19°W	SW7113
Gwavas (Helston)	Cornwall	50.11°N 05.28°W	SW6529
Gwbert	Ceredigion	52.10°N 04.68°W	SN1649
Gwedna	Cornwall	50.13°N 05.36°W	SW6032
Gweek	Cornwall	50.08°N 05.21°W	SW7026
Gwehelog	Monmouthshire	51.73°N 02.89°W	SO3804
Gwenddwr	Powys	52.07°N 03.37°W	SO0643
Gwennap	Cornwall	50.21°N 05.18°W	SW7340
Gwennap Head	Cornwall	50.03°N 05.67°W	SW372216
Gwenter	Cornwall	50.01°N 05.15°W	SW7417
Gwernaffield-y-Waun	Flintshire	53.16°N 03.19°W	SJ2064
Gwernafon	Powys	52.49°N 03.59°W	SN9290
Gwerneirin (Beguildy)	Powys	52.41°N 03.20°W	SO1880
Gwerneirin (Llandinam)	Powys	52.49°N 03.44°W	SO0289
Gwernesney	Monmouthshire	51.70°N 02.85°W	SO4101
Gwernogle	Carmarthenshire	51.98°N 04.14°W	SN5334
Gwernol	Denbighshire	53.05°N 03.19°W	SJ2052
Gwern y brenin	Shropshire	52.82°N 03.04°W	SJ3026
Gwernydd	Powys	52.60°N 03.36°W	SJ0802
Gwernymynydd	Flintshire	53.14°N 03.18°W	SJ2162
Gwern-y-Steeple	The Vale Of Glamorgan	51.46°N 03.34°W	ST0775
Gwersyllt	Wrexham	53.07°N 03.01°W	SJ3253
Gwespyr	Flintshire	53.33°N 03.33°W	SJ1183
Gwills	Cornwall	50.39°N 05.06°W	SW8259
Gwinear	Cornwall	50.18°N 05.37°W	SW5937
Gwinear Downs	Cornwall	50.15°N 05.36°W	SW6034
Gwithian	Cornwall	50.21°N 05.39°W	SW5841
Gwredog	Isle of Anglesey	53.34°N 04.40°W	SH4086
Gwrhay	Caerphilly	51.68°N 03.18°W	ST1899
Gwyddelwern	Denbighshire	53.00°N 03.38°W	SJ0746
Gwyddgrug	Carmarthenshire	51.99°N 04.24°W	SN4635
Gwynfryn	Wrexham	53.06°N 03.12°W	SJ2552
Gwystre	Powys	52.27°N 03.37°W	SO0665
Gwytherin	Conwy	53.13°N 03.69°W	SH8761

== Gy ==
Location	Locality	Coordinates (links to map & photo sources)	OS grid reference
Gyfelia	Wrexham	52.99°N 03.01°W	SJ3245
Gyffin	Conwy	53.26°N 03.84°W	SH7776
Gyrn	Denbighshire	53.11°N 03.25°W	SJ1658
Gyrn Goch	Gwynedd	53.00°N 04.38°W	SH4048
