= Greenside =

Greenside or Green Side may refer to the following places:

== England ==
- Greenside, Cumbria, a location
- Green Side, a hill in the Lake District
- Greenside, Derbyshire, a place in Derbyshire
- Greenside, Tyne and Wear
- Green Side, Kirklees, a location in West Yorkshire
- Green Side, Leeds, a location in West Yorkshire
- Greenside, Tameside, Greater Manchester
- Greenside, properly Greenside House, a house in Sheffield, South Yorkshire

== Scotland ==
- Greenside, Edinburgh, an area in central Edinburgh

== South Africa ==
- Greenside, Limpopo, a township in Polokwane, South Africa
- Greenside, Gauteng, Johannesburg
- Greenside, Mpumalanga

== See also ==
- Greenside School (disambiguation)
- Greenside Mine, a lead mine in the Lake District of England
