= Greenbank =

Greenbank may refer to:

== Places ==
=== Australia ===
- Greenbank, Queensland

=== Canada ===
- Greenbank, Ontario, Canada
  - Greenbank Airport

=== United Kingdom ===
- Greenbank, Bristol, England
- Greenbank, Cheshire, England; see United Kingdom locations
  - Greenbank, Chester, a house in England
  - Greenbank railway station
- Greenbank, Edinburgh, Scotland
- Greenbank Garden, a Category A listed house, garden, woodland and National Trust site in Clarkston, East Renfrewshire
- Greenbank, Falkirk, Scotland; see United Kingdom locations
- Greenbank, Falmouth, England; see Royal Cornwall Yacht Club
  - The Greenbank Hotel, Falmouth, Cornwall
- Greenbank (ward), Liverpool, England
  - Greenbank House
  - Greenbank Park
  - Greenbank (charity)
    - Greenbank Sports Academy, home of Mersey Tigers professional basketball team
- Greenbank, Plymouth, England
- Greenbank, Shetland Islands, Scotland; see United Kingdom locations

=== United States ===
- Greenbank, Delaware
- Greenbank, Washington
- GreenBank, a bank in Greeneville, Tennessee, USA being acquired by North American Financial Holdings

== Other uses ==
- Greenbank (surname)

== See also ==
- Green Bank (disambiguation)
