= Greensplat =

Demolished village in Cornwall, England

Coordinates: 50.362°N 4.817°W

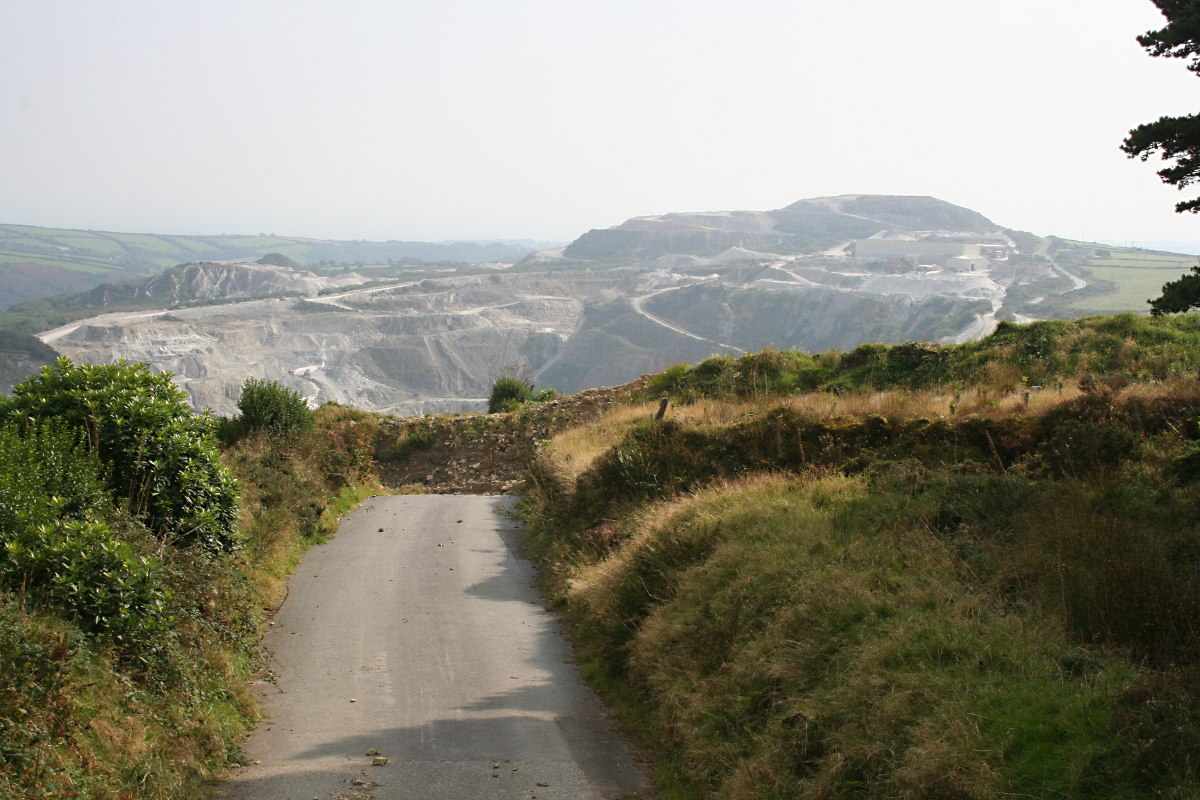
This road, now a dead end, used to lead to Greensplat village

Greensplat (Cornish: Splattglas) is a location in south Cornwall, England, United Kingdom. It is in the civil parish of Treverbyn immediately west of Carthew and approximately 2 miles (3 km) north of St Austell.

Greensplat is situated in the china clay area and the name is believed to be derived from Green's Plat, referring to a mine shaft nearby that was known as "the Plat". Greensplat is sometimes erroneously spelled Greensplatt.

== History ==
Until 1997 there was a settlement at Greensplat. However, due to expansion of the nearby Wheal Martyn china clay quarry the centre of Greensplat was entirely demolished. Most of the buildings were Victorian in period, with the exception of a few Georgian and earlier period cottages related to farming and tin streaming that took place prior to clay extraction. Until the Methodist chapel and adjoining Sunday School were demolished in 1997, Greensplat was still considered to be a village.

The former settlement was aligned on a north to south axis, and was roughly divided into three segments; north, central, and south, with the central area forming the bulk of the settlement. Greensplat was noted for its railway carriage homes which survived to be among those demolished. The last house to be demolished was "Kenwyn", a double fronted Victorian house—written on the building in red spray paint were the words "Kenwyn Do Not Demolish".

Following the demolition, the only remaining part of Greensplat is a semi-detached cottage at South Greensplat, which is the only inhabited building within quite a large area, surrounded by just under 100 acres (0.40 km^{2}) of uninhabited and abandoned land. The nearest inhabited settlements are at Old Pound to the west, Ruddlemoor to the east, and Carthew to the northeast.

The story of Greensplat's demolition is told in The Lost Villages by Henry Buckton published by I. B. Tauris & Co Ltd, London, Feb 2008, ISBN 1-84511-671-2.
