= Listed buildings in Bolton, Cumbria =

Bolton is a civil parish in Westmorland and Furness, Cumbria, England. It contains 14 buildings that are recorded in the National Heritage List for England. Of these, one is listed at Grade I, the highest of the three grades, two are at Grade II*, the middle grade, and the others are at Grade II, the lowest grade. The parish contains the village of Bolton, and is otherwise rural. The listed buildings comprise the former residence of the Bishops of Carlisle, now in ruins, a church and structures in the churchyard, houses in the village, a farmhouse and barn, a bridge, and a country house with associated structures.

== Key ==
Grade	Criteria
I	Buildings of exceptional interest, sometimes considered to be internationally important
II*	Particularly important buildings of more than special interest
II	Buildings of national importance and special interest

== Buildings ==
Name and location	Photograph	Date	Notes	Grade
All Saints Church; 54.60458°N 2.55987°W		12th century	The church has undergone alterations, and it was restored in 1848. It is in stone with buttresses, and has a slate roof with stone copings and apex finials. The church is long and narrow, and consists of a nave with a south porch, and a chancel. On the west gable is a bellcote with a saddleback roof. The church has retained some Norman features, including the north and south doors, and the slit windows in the chancel.	I
Bewley Castle; 54.58433°N 2.54637°W	—	Late 14th century	The building originated as a tower house, and was the residence of the Bishops of Carlisle. It was repaired and re-roofed in 1402, and from the 15th century it was used as a country house. Its condition later deteriorated, and by 1774 it was a ruin. The remains include walls, some up to a height of 30 feet (9.1 m), windows, a barrel vault, and parts of two garderobe towers. The structure is also a scheduled monument.	II*
Birdby Farmhouse and barn 54.61158°N 2.60774°W	—	Late Medieval	The farmhouse is in stone with river boulders, the barn is in stone, and both have slate roofs. The house was remodelled in the late 18th or early 19th century, and has quoins and moulding to the eaves. It has a symmetrical front of two storeys and two bays, with two three-light windows in the ground floor and two sash windows above. The entrance is in the outbuilding to the west, and this also contains segmental-headed opposed wagon doors.	II
Sundial; 54.60442°N 2.55982°W	—	1747	The sundial is in the churchyard of All Saints Church. It is in stone on a square chamfered medieval cross base. The sundial consists of a square pillar with a moulded capital and base, and with an inscription on the base. On the top is an inscribed and dated plate.	II
Bowness Table Tomb; 54.60457°N 2.55955°W	—	1760s (probable)	The table tomb is in the churchyard of All Saints Church. It has square corner supports, a worn inscription, and a brass plate recording details of two members of the Bowness family.	II
House, Fern Cottage and outbuilding 54.60361°N 2.56256°W	—	Late 18th century	A cottage, a house, and an outbuilding in a row, they are pebbledashed with a slate roof, and have two storeys and eight bays overall. The cottage has a doorway and two sash windows to the left, the house has a doorway and six windows, and the outbuilding has two doorways and one sash window. All the openings have stone surrounds.	II
White House; 54.60337°N 2.56154°W	—	Late 18th century	A house, later divided into a house and a shop, in stone with a slate roof. There are two storeys and five bays. The house has a central doorway and four windows; the shop to the left has a doorway, and a window in each floor.	II
Dovecote and pigsties, Crossrigg Hall; 54.61062°N 2.61040°W		c. 1830	The dovecote and pigsties are in stone with quoins and slate roofs, and are in an L-shaped plan forming a corner of a courtyard. The pigsties are in a single storey and have hipped roofs. The dovecote has two storeys, with a band between the storeys, and a pyramidal roof surmounted by an ogee lead dome and a weathercock. It contains bird openings, six doors, two sash windows in architraves with semicircular heads, and two small circular openings.	II
Garages, workshops and storerooms, Crossrigg Hall; 54.61084°N 2.61056°W	—	c. 1830	This was the original country house, stables were added in the late 19th century, and the whole was later converted for other uses. The buildings are in stone with slate roofs. The original part has two storeys and an L-shaped plan, and there is a single-storey part that has rusticated quoins, a dentilled cornice and an embattled parapet. The former stables have been converted into garages, and have a continuous arcade of six coach doors. At the south end is a former cottage with an embattled parapet.	II
Gate, walls and piers, Crossrigg Hall; 54.61166°N 2.60935°W	—	c. 1830	At the entrance to the drive to the hall are two flanking piers, two quadrant walls, and two end piers, all in ashlar. The walls have segmental copings, and the piers are rusticated with pyramidal caps. The railings on the walls and the gate are in wrought iron, and are elaborately decorated.	II
Gazebo, Crossrigg Hall; 54.61076°N 2.61091°W	—	c. 1830	The gazebo is at the junction of two walls in the grounds of the hall, and has two storeys, one bay, and a rhomboid plan. It is in stone with some brick, and has quoins, bands, and a projecting embattled parapet on corbels. In the ground floor is a door and a sash window. A curved decorative cast iron stairway with stone steps leads up to a French window in the upper floor.	II
Bridge over River Lyvennet; 54.60984°N 2.61147°W		1835	The bridge carries a roadway over the River Lyvennet. It is in cast iron, and has rusticated abutments and end parapets. The bridge consists of a single false four-centred arch with pierced spandrels. The roadway, which is about 10 feet (3.0 m) wide, consists of transverse wooden beams. The parapets and railings are ornately decorative, and at the east end is a wrought iron gate.	II
Walls and railings, Crossrigg Hall; 54.61026°N 2.61079°W	—	c. 1835	The low wall enclosed the former country house. It is in stone with segmental coping, and has cast iron railings. The railings are decorative, and have panels, reeded fleurs-de-lis standards, fluted colonettes, and urn finials.	II
Crossrigg Hall; 54.61100°N 2.61171°W		c. 1864	A country house designed by Anthony Salvin, it was altered and extended in about 1915 by J. H. Martindale in a similar style. The original part is in pink sandstone, the later parts are in yellower sandstone, and the roof is slated with stone copings and ball finials. The house has an asymmetrical plan, and is mainly in two storeys. The windows are mullioned, and some are also transomed. To the east is a domestic wing. Other features include a carriage porch, bay windows, and an embattled tower hiding a water tank.	II*
