= Green Bank =

Green Bank may refer to:

- Green bank, a financial institution that invests in clean energy
- Green Bank (Philippines), rural bank in the Caraga region, Philippines
- Green Bank (Texas), commercial bank in Texas
- Green Bank, Cumbria, place in England
- Green Bank, New Jersey, an unincorporated community
- Green Bank, West Virginia, community in Pocahontas County, West Virginia, USA
- Green Bank Telescope, radio telescope at Green Bank, West Virginia
- Green Bank equation, result in exobiology
- GreenBank, a bank in Greeneville, Tennessee, USA, acquired by North American Financial Holdings

== See also ==
- Ethical banking, a bank concerned with the social and environmental impacts of its investments and loans
- Greenbank (disambiguation)
- UK Green Investment Bank, an environmental funding institution of the UK government
