= Listed buildings in Dunnington =

Dunnington is a civil parish in the unitary authority of the City of York, North Yorkshire, England. It contains 19 listed buildings that are recorded in the National Heritage List for England. Of these, one is listed at Grade II*, the middle of the three grades, and the others are at Grade II, the lowest grade. The parish contains the villages of Dunnington and Grimston, and the surrounding countryside. Most of the listed buildings are houses and associated structures, and the others include a church and three crosses.

== Key ==
Grade	Criteria
II*	Particularly important buildings of more than special interest
II	Buildings of national importance and special interest

== Buildings ==
Name and location	Photograph	Date	Notes	Grade
St Nicholas' Church; 53.96619°N 0.98290°W		Late 11th century	The church has been altered and extended through the centuries, including some rebuilding in 1877 by C. Hodgson Fowler. It is built in limestone, sandstone and millstone grit, with roofs of Welsh slate, red tile and lead. The church consists of a nave, north and south aisles, a north porch, a chancel with aisles, a south vestry and organ chamber, and a west tower. The tower has two stages, slits on the lower stage, a string course, clock faces, and an embattled parapet. The porch has a round arch with roll moulding. On the chancel aisle is a re-used priest's door with a pointed arch.	II*
Cross, Dunnington Rectory; 53.96611°N 0.98214°W	—	12th century (probable)	The cross in the grounds of the rectory has a square plan, and on it is a polygonal sundial, dating possibly from the 15th century. It has a plinth, and a fluted octagonal shaft, but no gnomon, and is about 1.5 metres (4 ft 11 in) in height.	II
Cross shaft, St Nicholas' Church; 53.96613°N 0.98282°W	—	13th century (probable)	The cross shaft in the churchyard, to the south of the church, is in magnesian limestone. The base has a square plan, the shaft is octagonal, and it is about 1.5 metres (4 ft 11 in) in height.	II
Village Cross; 53.96510°N 0.97982°W		Medieval	The village cross stands in a road junction, it is in magnesian limestone, with a square plan, and is about 2 metres (6 ft 7 in) in height. The cross consists of a stepped plinth, and a shaft with a tapering top surmounted by a later ball finial.	II
24 York Street; 53.96452°N 0.98121°W		Early to mid-18th century	The house is in colourwashed rendered brick, with a three-course floor band, a stepped and cogged eaves band, and a swept pantile roof. There are two storeys and three bays. Steps lead up to the central doorway, above which is a small casement window, and the other windows are sashes.	II
41 York Street; 53.96370°N 0.98244°W	—	Early to mid-18th century	The house is in pinkish-brown brick, with a stepped three-course floor band, a stepped and dentilled eaves band, and a tile roof. There are two storeys and four bays. The doorway has a cambered arch, and above it is a blocked window. The other windows are sashes with stone sills, and all the upper floor windows have painted flat arches.	II
Chapel Farm; 53.96448°N 0.98073°W		Early to mid-18th century	The house is in colourwashed rendered brick, with a stepped and dentilled eaves cornice, and a swept pantile roof. There are two storeys and three bays. The doorway has a Roman Doric doorcase, and a door with a blocked fanlight. The windows are sashes with stone sills.	II
Manor Farmhouse; 53.95424°N 1.00585°W		Early to mid-18th century	The farmhouse is in pinkish-brown brick, with a stepped floor band, a stepped and cogged eaves cornice, and a tile roof. There are two storeys and four bays, and a rear outshut. The doorway has pilasters, a fanlight and a hood. The windows are sashes under elliptical arches, and at the rear is a round-arched stair window.	II
Dunnington Hall; 53.97158°N 0.97313°W	—	Mid-18th century	A rear block was added to the house in 1901–02 by Temple Moore. The house is in pinkish-brown brick, with red brick dressings, a modillion eaves cornice, and a Welsh slate roof. There are three storeys and a basement, and three bays. Steps lead up to a central doorway with a fanlight and a triangular pediment. The windows are sashes under flat arches of red gauged brick, and the basement has casement windows under elliptical arches of red rubbed brick.	II
Dunnington House and walls 53.96356°N 0.97700°W		Mid-18th century	The house is in pinkish-brown brick, with a four-course floor band, a wooden eaves cornice, and a pantile roof with tumbled-in brick on the gable ends. There are two storeys and three bays. The central doorway has pilasters, a fanlight, a frieze, and a hood on consoles. The windows are sashes with fluted wedge lintels. The flanking screen walls have stone dressings and coping, and a T-shaped plan. The left wall contains three round arches, the right wall has two, all blocked, with impost bands. They are ramped up at the ends, and the right wall has a ball finial.	II
40 York Street; 53.96400°N 0.98243°W	—	Mid to late 18th century	The house is in pinkish-brown brick, with red rubbed brick dressings, a stepped three-course floor band, and a pantile roof. There are two storeys and three bays. The central doorway has a fanlight and a hood on consoles. The windows are sashes under flat arches of red rubbed brick.	II
61 York Street; 53.96332°N 0.98380°W	—	Late 18th century	The house is in pinkish-brown brick with a swept pantile roof. There are two storeys and three bays, and an outshut on the left. The central doorway has a fanlight, the windows are sashes, and all the openings have fluted wedge lintels. On the outshut are casement windows under elliptical arches.	II
Grimston Hill House; 53.95711°N 1.00344°W		Late 18th century	The house, which was later extended, is in whitewashed pinkish-brown and yellow brick, with a hipped Welsh slate roof. There are two storeys and four bays, the second bay fully canted. The entrance on the third bay has an Ionic doorcase with a frieze and a hood, and a doorway with a fanlight. The windows are sashes, mainly under flat arches of rubbed brick, and there is a raking roof dormer with casements.	II
Dunnington Lodge, stable and coach house 53.96637°N 0.98216°W		1823–24	The former rectory and attached cottage to the right are in red brick with slate roofs. The house has bracketed wooden eaves, two storeys and three bays. The central doorway has baseless fluted Tuscan columns and a fanlight, and the windows are sashes. At the rear is a porch, a canted bay window, and a casement window. The cottage has two storeys and two bays. It contains a doorway with a fanlight and sash windows. Attached is a wall linking it with a stable that has a pantile roof. This is linked by a wall to the coach house that has a segmental brick carriage arch and cart doors with a wooden lintel.	II
10 Church Street; 53.96546°N 0.98053°W		Early 19th century	The house is in pinkish-brown brick with a pantile roof. There are two storeys and one bay. The doorway on the left has fluted pilasters, a fanlight with radial glazing bars, and an open dentilled pediment. The windows are sashes under cambered arches.	II
12 Church Street; 53.96553°N 0.98057°W		Early 19th century	The house is in pinkish-brown brick with a pantile roof. There are two storeys and two bays. On the front are a doorway and sash windows, and all the ground floor openings are under flat arches of painted gauged brick.	II
14 Church Street; 53.96559°N 0.98063°W		Early 19th century	The house is in pinkish-brown brick with a pantile roof. There are two storeys and two bays. The central doorway has a divided fanlight, and the windows are sashes. All the ground floor openings are under flat arches of painted gauged brick.	II
Coach House, Dunnington Hall; 53.97139°N 0.97193°W	—	Early 19th century	The coach house with a dovecote above is in pinkish-brown brick, with red brick dressings, a dentilled cornice, and a hipped tile roof. There are two storeys and one bay, and it contains round arched recesses on three sides, and an elliptical carriage arch. On the upper floor is a blind oculus, and pigeon holes with a shelf. On the roof is a lantern with a weathervane.	II
Grimston Court; 53.95843°N 1.00272°W	—	1903	The house, designed by Walter Brierley, and later used for other purposes, is in red brick on a plinth, with sandstone dressings, floor and sill bands, and a slate roof. There are two storeys, a double depth L-shaped plan, a front of seven bays, and a four-bay wing. Steps lead up to the doorway on the main range, with a decorated Tudor arch under a continuous hood mould. Above it is a mullioned and transomed oriel window, and the other windows have single lights, or have mullions and transoms, and all have quoined surrounds. There is another Tudor-arched entrance on the wing, and a canted bay window.	II
