= Dunnington =

Village and civil parish in North Yorkshire, England

Coordinates: 53.96542°N 0.97870°W

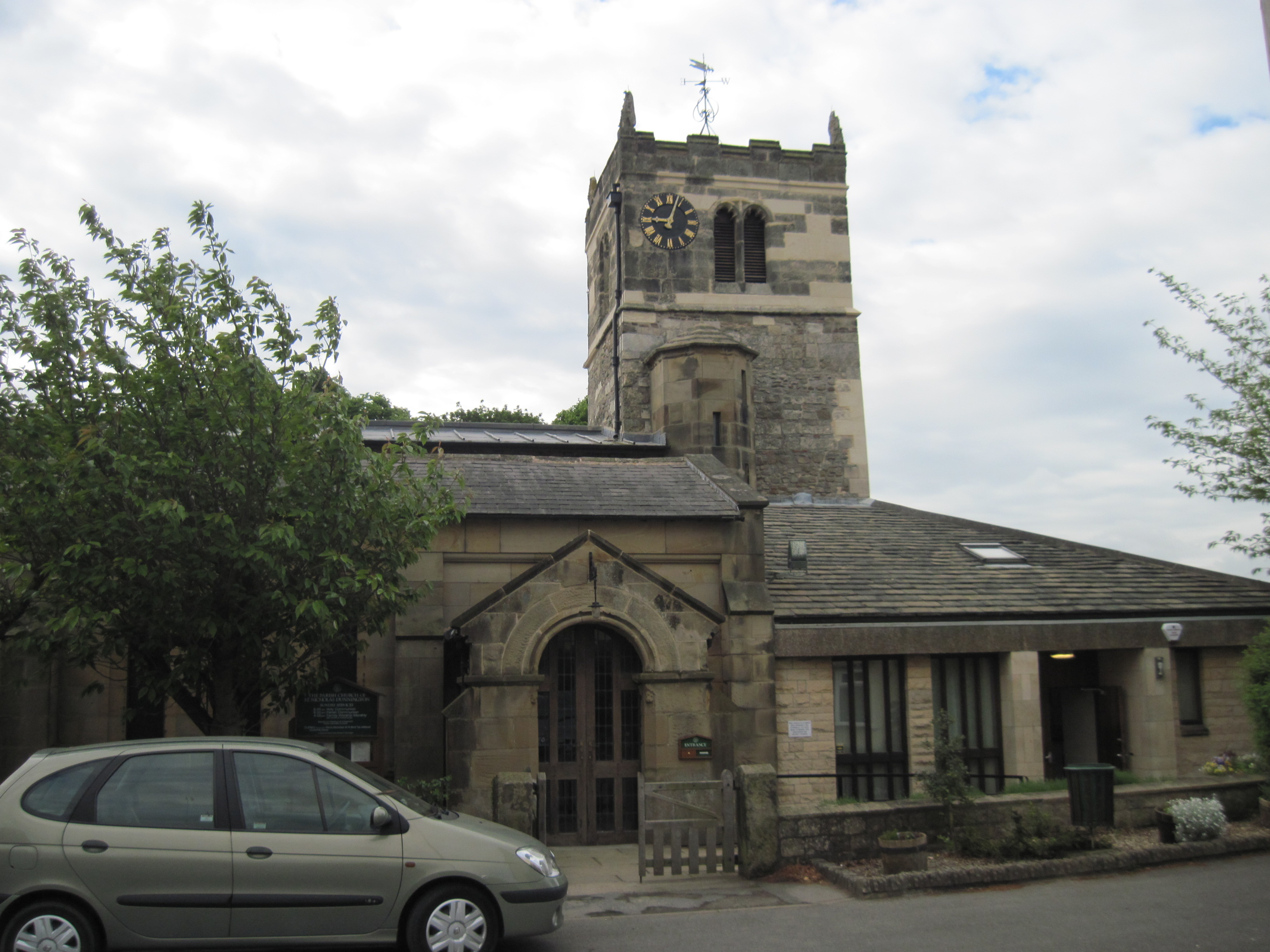
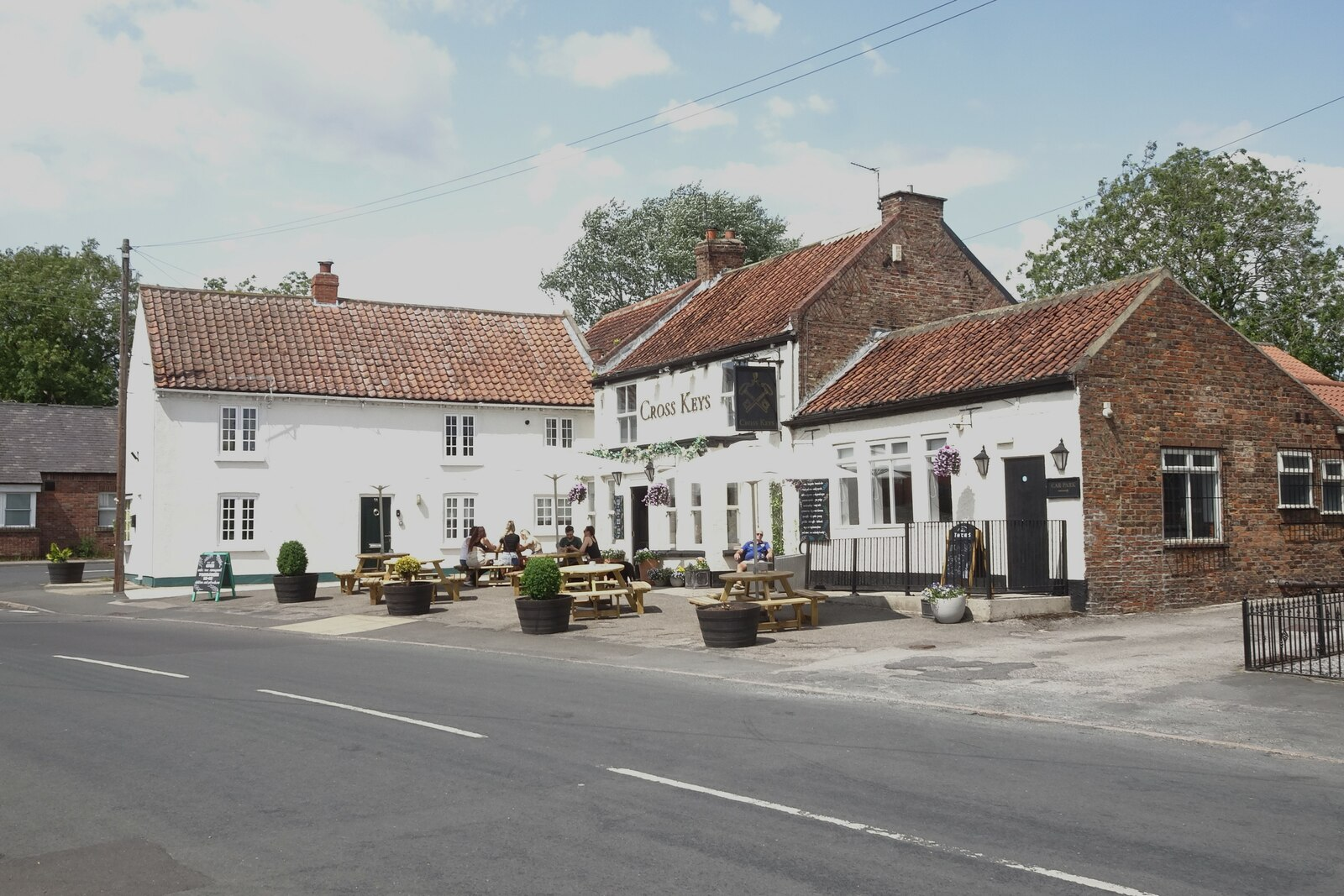
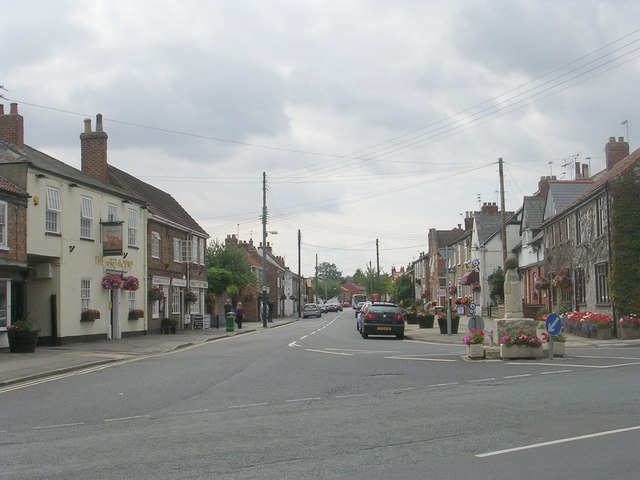
- The Church The Cross Keys York Street

- Location within North Yorkshire
- Population: 3,230 (2011 census)
- OS grid reference: SE671526
  - London: 175 mi (282 km) S
- Civil parish: Dunnington
- Unitary authority: City of York
- Ceremonial county: North Yorkshire
- Region: Yorkshire and the Humber
- Country: England
- Sovereign state: United Kingdom
- Post town: YORK
- Postcode district: YO19
- Police: North Yorkshire
- Fire: North Yorkshire
- Ambulance: Yorkshire
- UK Parliament: York Outer

Dunnington is a village and civil parish in the City of York and ceremonial county of North Yorkshire, England. The population of the civil parish was 3,230 at the 2011 census. The village is approximately 4 miles (6 km) east from York city centre. The parish includes the hamlet of Grimston.

The village was historically part of the East Riding of Yorkshire until 1974. It was then a part of the Selby District in North Yorkshire from 1974 until 1996. Since 1996 it has been part of the City of York unitary authority.

== History ==
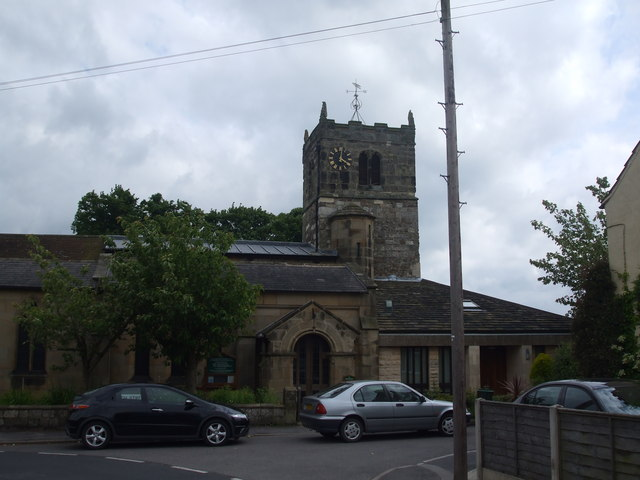
St Nicholas Church

Dunnington village was an Anglo-Saxon settlement, and was listed in the 1086 Domesday Book as "Donniton", which, according to Mills, translates as an "estate associated with a man called Dun(n)a". The fields around the village became the country's major area for growing chicory. On 1 April 1935 the civil parish of Grimston was abolished and merged with Dunnington.

Between 1913 and 1926 Dunnington was served by passenger trains on the Derwent Valley Light Railway, and the remaining goods-only railway was withdrawn in stages following the Beeching Axe. Steam trains ran to Dunnington on this line between 1977 and 1979, but following the closure of a crop drying facility the last tracks covering the route to York via Murton and Osbaldwick were lifted.

In 2006 Dunnington published a village design statement (VDS) as part of a national scheme introduced by the Countryside Commission in 1996. This describes the history, visual characteristics and local setting of the village and surrounding landscape. The VDS forms part of the Parish Plan.

Dunnington was the category winner in the small town category (for settlements with population over 3,000) of the 2014 Britain in Bloom competition.

The original Victorian village school was demolished, but a doctors' surgery building that sits on the site was built using a complementary construction style and reclaimed materials.

== Community ==
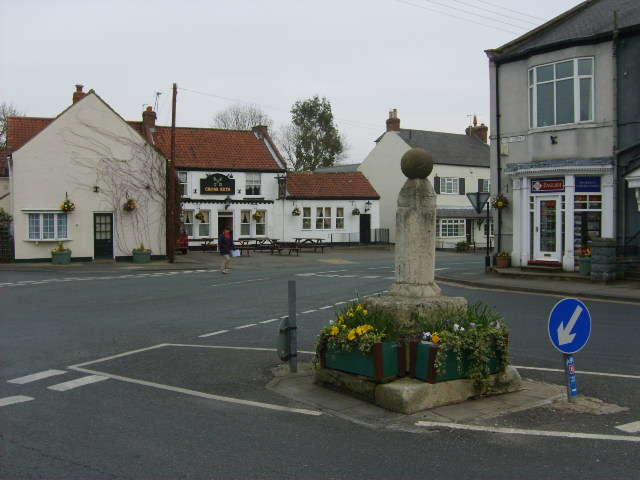
Dunnington village cross

The village has a historic centre, part of which is a conservation area.

According to the 2001 census, the parish had a population of 3,194. Before 1996 it had been part of the Selby district, and before 1974 the East Riding of Yorkshire.

Dunnington is connected to York by the A1079 York to Hull, and the A166 York to Bridlington roads. The village is on the FirstGroup bus company's number 10 route through York as well as East Yorkshire Motor Services number 45 route which runs from Bridlington to York.

A monthly magazine for the village and neighbouring communities, The Grapevine, is published by the local church, and contains news from village organisations and feature articles.

Since 2017 Dunnington has had an online community network—known as This is Dunnington—for communicating, sharing and commenting on events, news, developments and activities in the parish and village.

Recreational areas within or around Dunnington are Hagg Wood, Hassacarr Nature Reserve, Julia's Memorial Garden and a play park. Hassacarr Nature Reserve has attracted some 5,000 visitors over the past 20 years, and has recently been awarded Local Nature Reserve status.

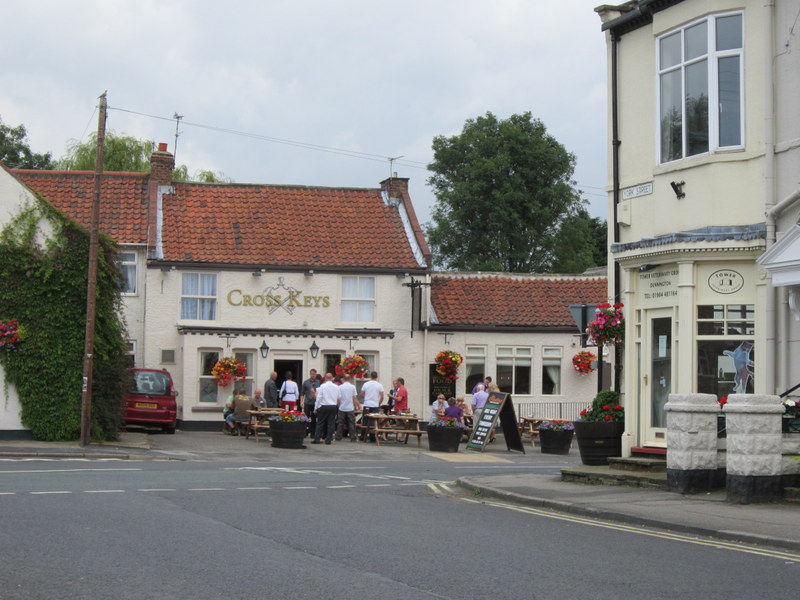
The Cross Keys

Dunnington has one public house— The Cross Keys. Dunnington Sports Club is also open as a bar. The village also has a library, a doctors' surgery, a dental practice and a reading room at the Village Hall. The village school is Dunnington C of E Primary School.

Dunnington retains a small independent retail area mainly in and around York Street. Services include a newsagent, florist, hairdressers, a beauty salon, fast food, a bistro and a bakery. On the location of the old Dunnington railway station, the modern industrial estate is the home of wide range of light industrial businesses and services.

The Grade: II* listed St Nicholas' Church dates in part from the late 11th century with later additions and alterations to the 19th, when it was rebuilt by C. Hodgson Fowler.

Village sport facilities include those for bowls, cricket, football, tennis, squash, and ladies hockey. There is also a gymnasium.

== See also ==
- Listed buildings in Dunnington

== Gallery ==
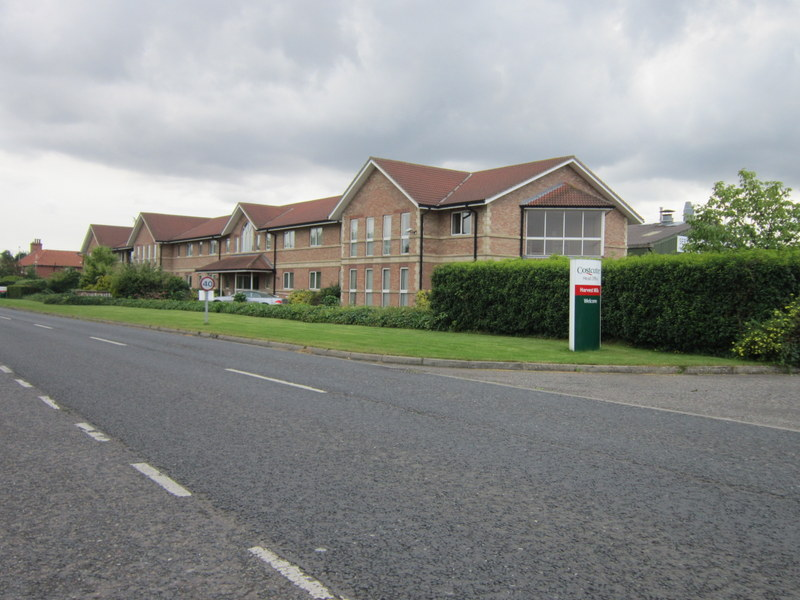
Office space at Dunnington Industrial Estate

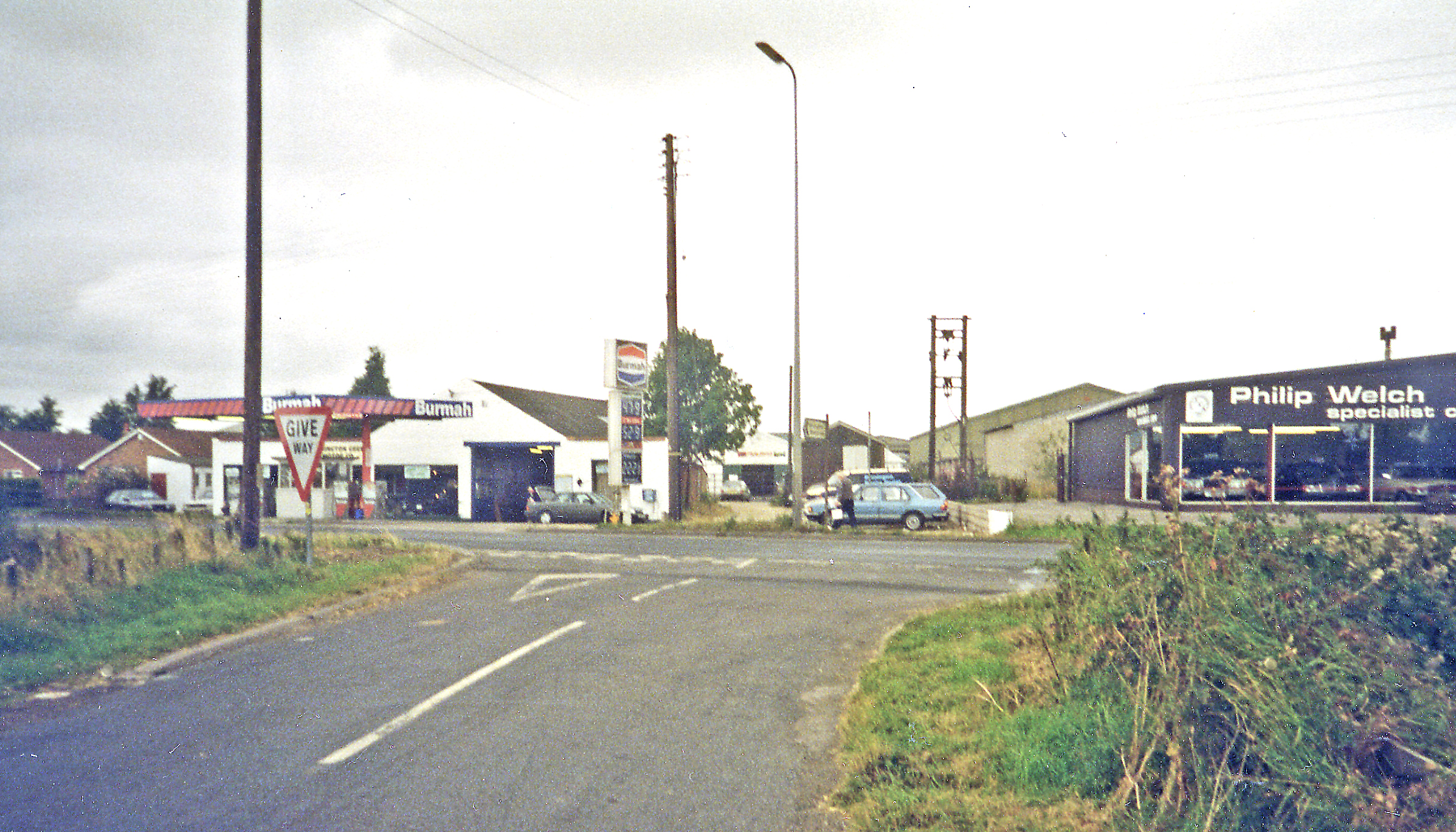
Dunnington station site, Hull Road
