= Eden Grove School =

Location
- Bolton; Appleby-in-Westmorland, Cumbria, CA16 6AJ; England; 54.6058°N 2.56125°W

Information
- Type: Independent School Approved for SEN Pupils
- Closed: 2013
- Department for Education URN: 112447 Tables
- Ofsted: Reports
- Gender: Boys
- Age: 8 to 16

Eden Grove School was a residential special school in Bolton near the town of Appleby-in-Westmorland in Cumbria, England.

The school was opened in September 1955.

The school provided 52-week education and care for boys. Placements were long term and for up to 52 weeks a year, depending on individual need; 38-week placements were also available upon request.

The school closed in 2013.
