= Bolton, Cumbria =

Village and civil parish in England

Coordinates: 54.604°N 2.561°W

Bolton
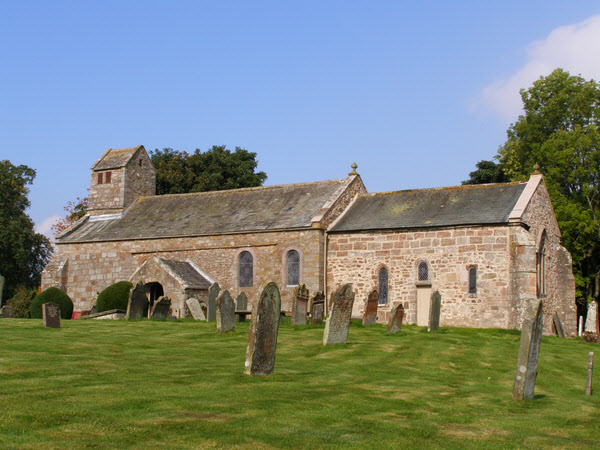
- All Saints Church

- Location in Eden, Cumbria Location within Cumbria
- Population: 435 (2011)
- OS grid reference: NY6323
- Civil parish: Bolton
- Unitary authority: Westmorland and Furness
- Ceremonial county: Cumbria
- Region: North West
- Country: England
- Sovereign state: United Kingdom
- Post town: APPLEBY IN WESTMORLAND
- Postcode district: CA16
- Dialling code: 01768
- Police: Cumbria
- Fire: Cumbria
- Ambulance: North West
- UK Parliament: Westmorland and Lonsdale

Bolton is a village and civil parish in Westmorland and Furness, Cumbria, England, about 4 miles (6 km) north west of Appleby-in-Westmorland, and on the River Eden. According to the census of 2001, it had a population of 416, increasing to 435 at the census of 2011. The parish touches Brougham, Colby, Cliburn, Crackenthorpe, King's Meaburn, Kirkby Thore, Morland and Temple Sowerby.

== Features ==
There are 14 listed buildings in Bolton. Bolton has a pub called the New Crown Inn (formerly the Eden Vale Inn), two schools, a primary school called Bolton Primary School, a church called All Saints Church, and a priory school called Eden Grove School, which is now closed.

Crossrigg Hall is a Grade II* listed country house, designed by Anthony Salvin in 1864. Bewley Castle was a medieval residence of the bishops of Carlisle. There is a story told, that a castle servant named Marget Dawe once murdered a highwayman named Belted Will Scott, after he gained entrance to the castle dressed as a woman.

== History ==
The name "Bolton" means 'Collection of buildings'. Bolton was a chapelry in Morland parish until 1866, when it became a separate civil parish.
