= Wheal Martyn =

Open-air museum in Cornwall, UK

- Hwel Martyn
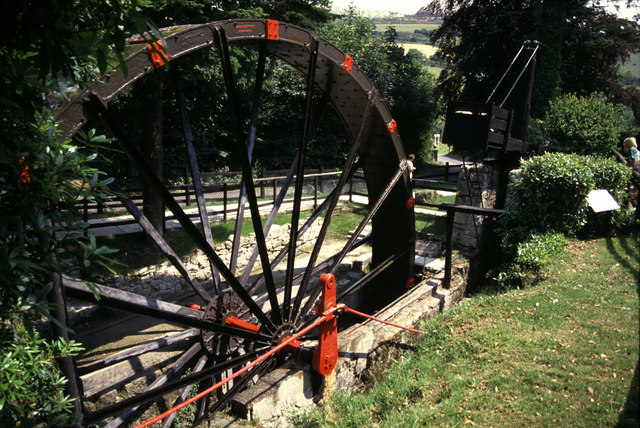
- The 35 ft waterwheel
- Established: 1975
- Location: Carthew, Cornwall grid reference SX 005 555
- Coordinates: 50.3654°N 4.8070°W
- Type: Open-air museum
- Website: www.wheal-martyn.com

The Wheal Martyn China Clay Museum (Cornish: Gwithti Pri Gwynn Hwel Martyn) is a museum of china clay mining, at Carthew, on the B3274 road about 2 miles (3.2 km) north of St Austell in Cornwall, England. A Victorian clay works has been preserved, and there is an exhibition building.

== Background ==
The museum is set in 26 acres (11 ha) of ground, and is based around two former china clay works. A large collection of objects, machinery, photographs and other archive material is preserved. It was established as a charity in 1975, with John Stengelhofen as its first director; in 2010 it was taken over by the charity South West Lakes Trust.

Part of the site is a Scheduled Monument, listed on 11 April 1979. The grounds include a Site of Special Scientific Interest, because of the geological features of the locality.

== History ==
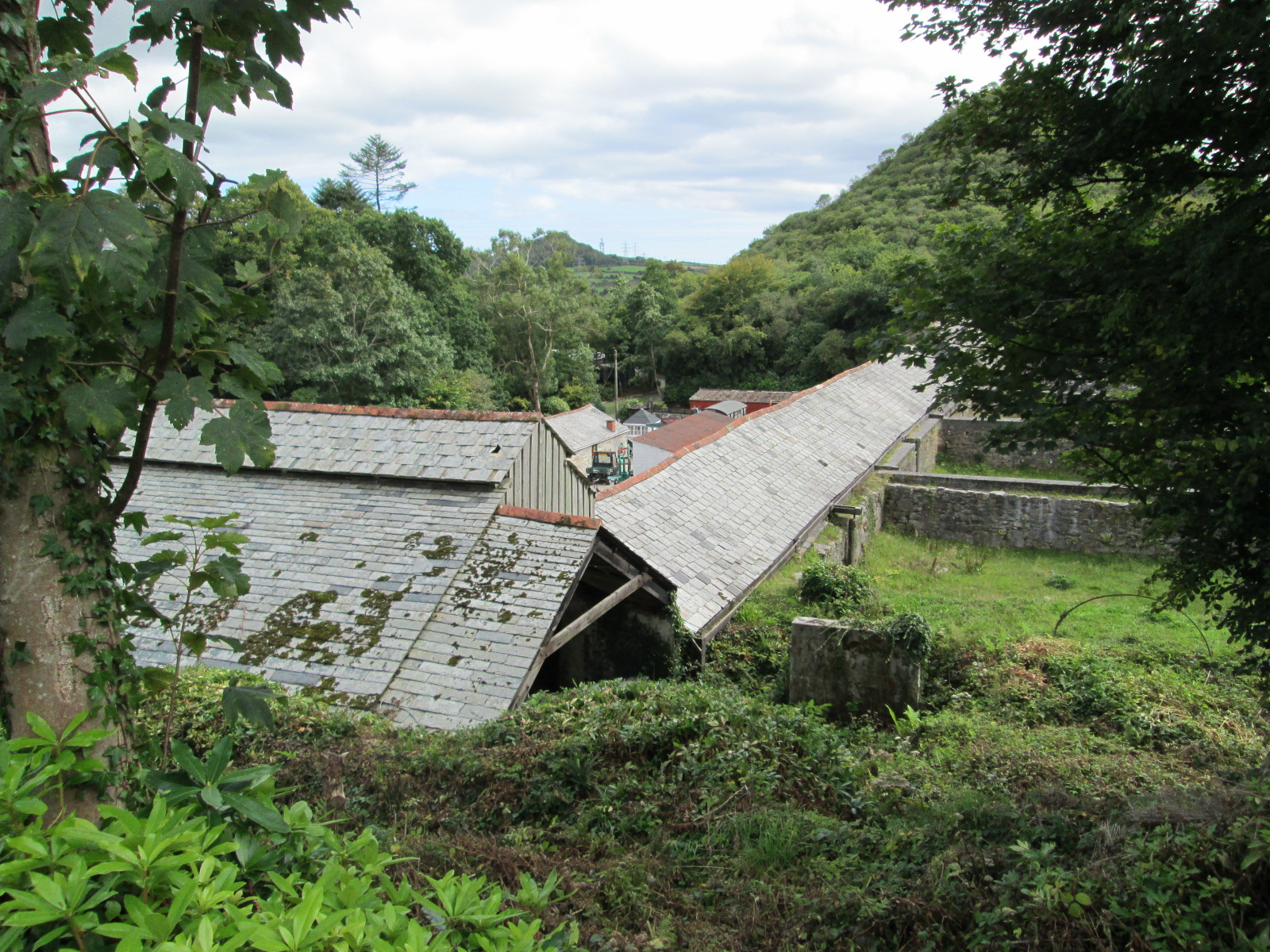
The settling tanks (on the right) and the adjacent pan kiln (the long building)

In 1790 Richard Martyn bought the Carthew Estate, and his son Elias started the Wheal Martyn china clay works there in the 1820s. By the 1840s there were five pits, and by 1869 Wheal Martyn was producing 2000 tons of clay a year. After Elias's death in 1872, his son Richard closed or leased works to other operators.

John Lovering took on the lease of Wheal Martyn in the 1880s, and made many modifications to the works. The pit at Wheal Martyn closed in 1931, but the pan kiln, for drying clay, was used for clay from nearby pits until 1969. The Gomm china clay works, which is also part of the site, was leased by the Martyn brothers from the Mount Edgcumbe Estate about 1878, and was worked until the 1920s.

Wheal Martyn pit reopened in 1971 and is now worked by Imerys Minerals Ltd.

== Clay works ==
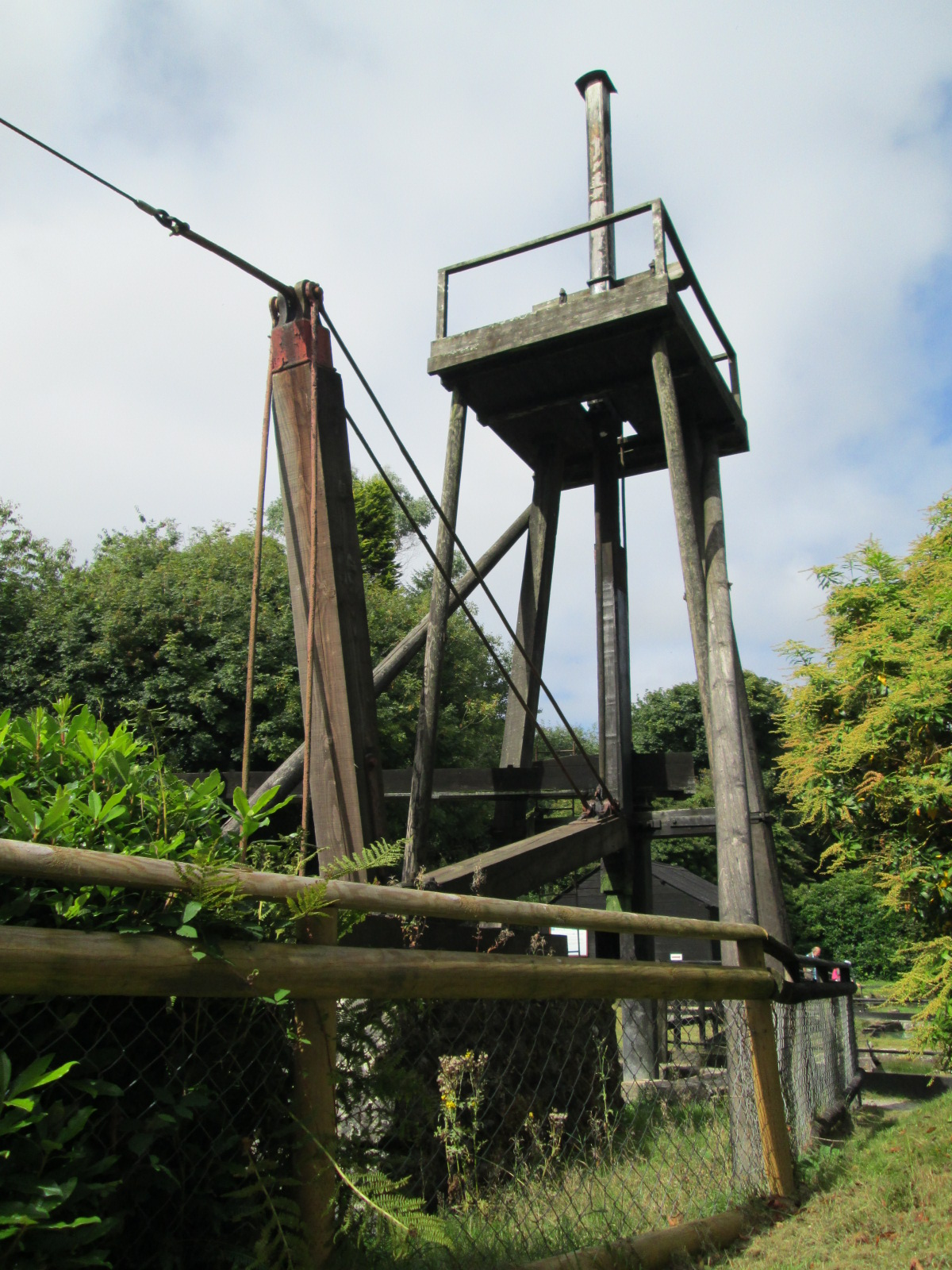
The slurry pump, powered by the cable on the left from a waterwheel

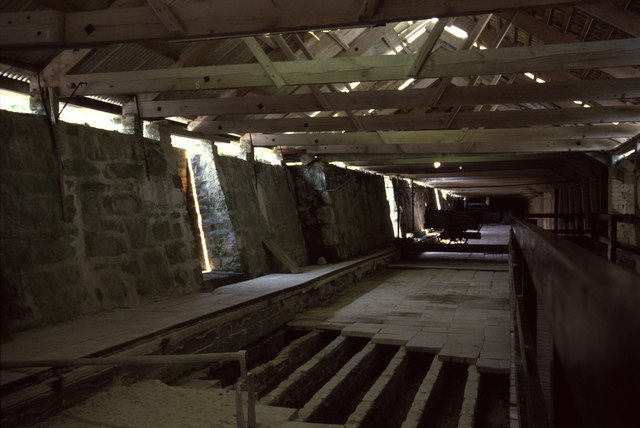
The dry. Part of the floor has been lifted to show the space through which the hot gases passed.

In order to pump clay slurry from the pit, which is some distance from a source of water, a system of iron rods transmits power, by a reciprocating motion, from a waterwheel of diameter 35 feet (11 m), made at Charlestown Foundry in the 1880s. The waterwheel was in use until about 1940, and was restored in 1976.

The slurry pump, used to pump slurry around the site, is powered by a waterwheel of diameter 18 feet (5.5 m), built about 1902.

There are areas that were used for thickening the clay: settling pits, with a sloping floor, where the clay settled for several days until it had about 12% solids; settling tanks, where the clay reached about 30% solids in two to three months; the pan kiln, or "dry", where clay was heated from below by gases from coal-fired furnaces, and dried in one to three days, depending on the distance from the fire end. Adjacent is the linhay, where about 1000 tons of clay could be stored; from here it was taken away to the customer.

== Transport section ==
Examples are exhibited of transport used in the clay industry: a Pecketts railway locomotive of 1899, used at Lee Moor Pit in Devon; a 19th-century clay wagon (to be pulled by a team of three horses); a 1934 ERF lorry; and a First World War Peerless lorry.

== Display areas ==
There are displays showing life in the china clay industry in the 19th century, including reconstructions of a clay worker's kitchen, and a cooper's workshop, where casks for transporting high-grade clay were made.
