= Morden Carthew =

East India Company India Army Officer

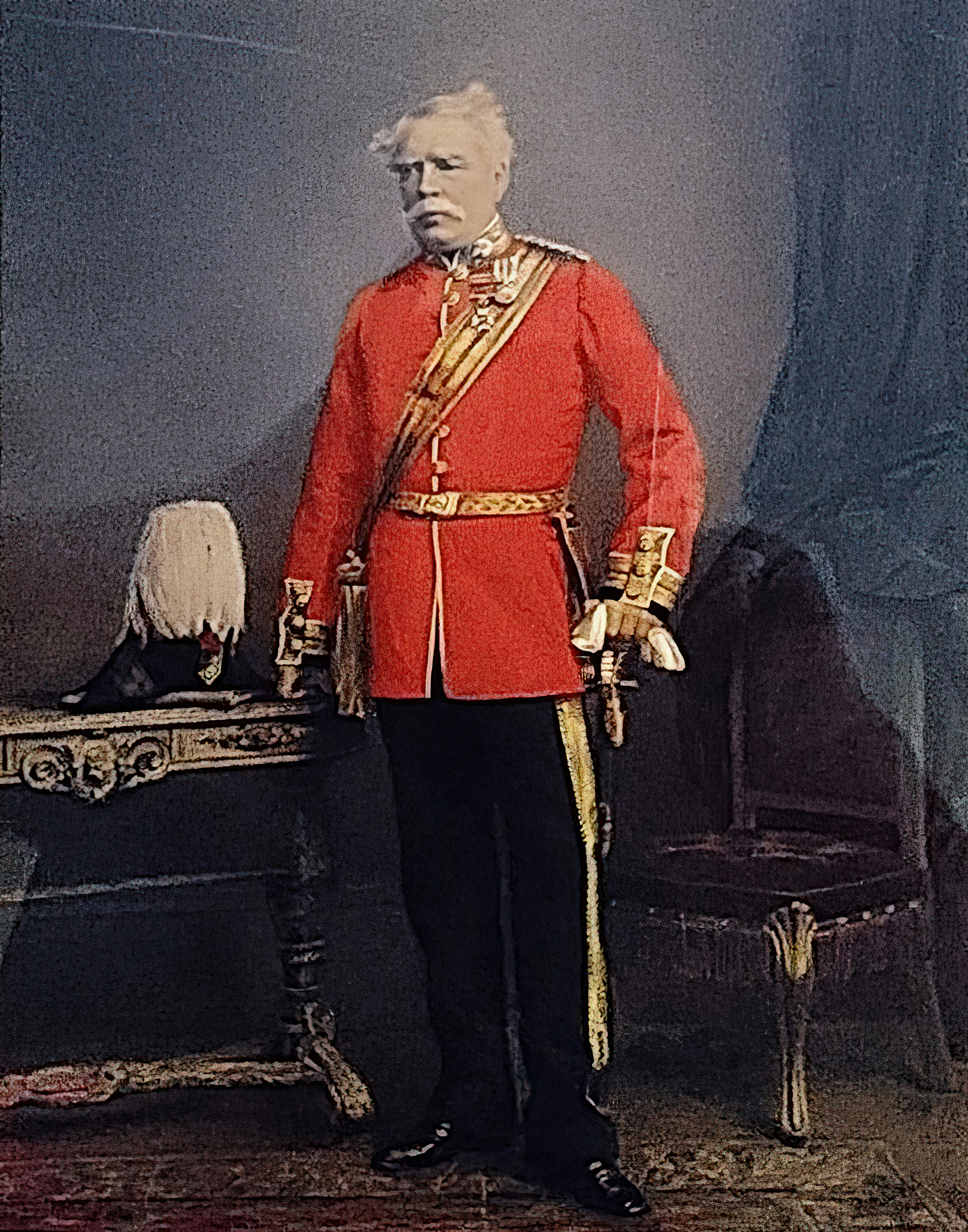
General Morden Carthew CB

General Morden Carthew CB (25 October 1804 – 4 September 1888) was an officer in the service of the East India Company (E.I.C.) Indian Army in the Madras Presidency, India and South East Asia during the mid 19th century.

== Early life ==
Morden Carthew, the eldest son of the Reverend Morden Carthew and Elizabeth Tweed-Pyke, was born in Frettenham, Norfolk where his father was the rector.

== Military career ==
Carthew was nominated as an officer cadet by Sir William Taylor Money, a director of the East India Company, and joined the Company on 12 January 1821. In his 56-year career he served in the Madras Presidency, Bengal, Burma (modern Myanmar) and Singapore. He first arrived in Madras aboard the ship HMS Jupiter on 29 June 1821 as an ensign and was appointed to the 11th Madras Native Infantry. He was promoted from senior ensign to lieutenant on 19 April 1823 and shortly after transferred to the 21st Madras Native Infantry (M.N.I.) where he would spend most of his career. Carthew continued to rise through the ranks and became Commanding Officer of the 21st M.N.I. He commanded the 21st M.N.I. in the Straits Settlement, Singapore from 1846 to 1849 and later was Divisional Commander of Pegu Province in Burma from 1861 to 1863. He is portrayed in a painting by acclaimed colonial artist J.T. Thompson and referred to in a poem by colonial era Malay scholar and poet Abdullah B. Abdul-Kadir, leading his troops on horseback to assist in fighting a fire in Gelang in Singapore in 1847.

== Involvement in the Indian Mutiny of 1857 ==
On 10 May 1857 a contingent of Sepoy soldiers rose up against the East India Company army, firstly in Meerut and then in Delhi, in an action that was to spread across the upper Ganges and central India and was variously known as the Indian Mutiny, Sepoy Mutiny and Indian Uprising. Carthew was promoted to the rank of brigadier on 18 August 1857 in order to command troops in Bengal against the mutinous Gwalior regiment.

On 26 August 1857 Carthew was given orders to assist in holding the Bithoor Road at Cawnpoor, preventing the Gwalior troops from entering Cawnpoor. For several days Carthew and the E.I.C. troops succeeded in repelling the mutineers but on the evening of 28 August 1857, following heavy fighting, Carthew ordered the retreat of the E.I.C. troops, effectively surrendering the town of Cawnpoor to the mutineers. Carthew's withdrawal initially drew the ire of his superior officers with his commander-in-chief, General Colin Campbell, responding to the news by dispatch,

"... although his excellency fully admits the arduous nature of the service which Brigadier Carthew had been engaged during the 28th of November, he cannot recall his approval of that officer's retreat on the evening of that day. Under the instruction of Major-general Windham, his commanding officer, Brigadier Carthew had been placed in position. No discretion of retiring [retreating] was allowed him".

General Campbell's dispatch goes on to berate Carthew for retreating without first seeking permission from his immediate superior officer (Maj. Gen. Windham) and for failing to wait for reinforcements which Windham had already ordered to Carthew's position in Cawnpoor. Whilst first denying any concession for retreat had been given, Major General Windham later conceded that he had given permission for Carthew to withdraw from his position should the need arise, and the order to withdraw given by Carthew was correctly issued given the circumstances, thus exonerating Brigadier Carthew from any wrongdoing.

Carthew would eventually be awarded a Companion of the Order of Bath, Military Division (CB), on 13 March 1867 in recognition of his service during the uprising.

== The Banda and Kirwee Booty ==
Carthew was a claimant in the case of the Banda and Kirwee booty, a treasure hoard captured from the towns of Banda and Kirwee in Bengal by British forces under the command of Lord Clyde and General Whitlock during mop-up operations following the 1857 mutiny. The total value of the booty was estimated as in excess of £700,000 sterling in 1858 or more than £92million sterling today. Whilst technically the property of the Crown, there were several claimants to the booty, including Carthew. In order to determine how the booty would be distributed, the case was firstly taken before parliament with the argument that the maritime law under which booty captured at sea is distributed among its captors should also apply to booty captured by land forces. Parliament ultimately deferred the case and claimants to the High Court of the Admiralty where it was heard before the Right Honourable Stephen Lushington D.L.C. who ultimately awarded the entire bounty to General Whitlock for distribution among those of his troops directly involved in its capture and denying, among other officers, Carthew's claim.

== Family ==
Carthew married Jemima Ewart, daughter of John Ewart of Mullock, in Bombay (modern Mumbai), India, on 16 July 1827. John Ewart is also the fourth great-grandfather of Sir Tony Blair, former Prime Minister of the United Kingdom, through Jemima's elder sister, Jane. The Ewarts were direct descendants of King James V of Scotland, Christian I of Denmark and other modern royals and nobles. Carthew is also a direct descendent of Edward the I and II of England.

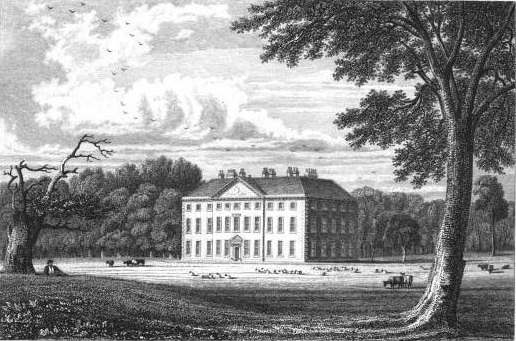
Benacre Hall Suffolk

Carthew inherited Woodbridge Abbey in Woodbridge Suffolk from his uncle, Admiral William Carthew and was the great-great grandson of London serjeant-at-law, Thomas Carthew esq. He was also the brother-in-law and cousin of the antiquarian and genealogist George Alfred Carthew. The Carthew's had also previously owned Benacre Hall in Suffolk which originally belonged to Carthew's great, great Grandfather, Thomas Carthew.

The Carthew's had ten children, including:

- Margaret - Born 17 September 1828 in Madras (modern Chennai), Married Lt. Col. Hugh Rigg, E.I.C. officer and Aide-de-camp to General Carthew, and later of Crossrigg Hall, Cumbria and High Sheriff and Deputy Lieutenant of Westmorland and a magistrate.
- Morden - Born 21 June 1832, would go on to have a career of note as an officer in the E.I.C. and later take on the surname Yorstoun as a requirement of inheritance. Married Maynard Bogle, daughter of Major General Sir Archibald Bogle

Carthew retired under Royal Warrant on 1 October 1877 and was promoted to full general. He died on 4 September 1888 at Denton, Norfolk.

== Additional reading ==
Colonel Malleson (1889) Volume IV, Kaye’s and Malleson’s History of the Indian Mutiny of 1857–8, pp.162 - 180
