= Carthew =

Carthew is a surname, and may refer to:

- George Alfred Carthew (1807–1882) was an English solicitor, antiquarian and genealogist
- Kirsten Carthew, Canadian film director, producer and screenwriter
- Morden Carthew (1804–1888), British East India Company army officer
- Richard Carthew (born 1956), developmental biologist
