= St Nicholas' Church, Dunnington =

Grade II* listed church in York, England

Coordinates: 53°57′58″N 0°58′58″W

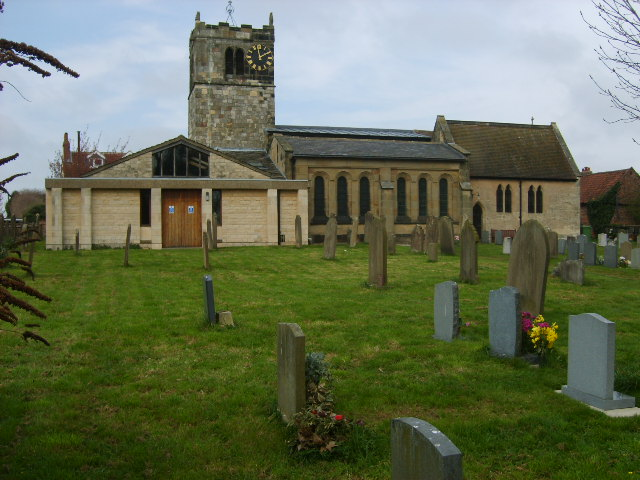
The church, seen from the south, in 2007

St Nicholas' Church, Dunnington is a Grade II* listed parish church in Dunnington, a village in the rural south-eastern part of the City of York, in England.

The oldest fragments of the church date from the 11th century, with the two-bay nave and lower part of the tower being 12th century. North and south aisles, since replaced, were also added. In the 13th century, the east end of the church was rebuilt as a three-bay chancel is 13th century, with the original piscina and sedilia surviving inside, along with two brackets which now support 19th century sculptures. The upper part of the tower dates from the 15th century. The church is built of a mixture of limestone, sandstone and millstone grit.

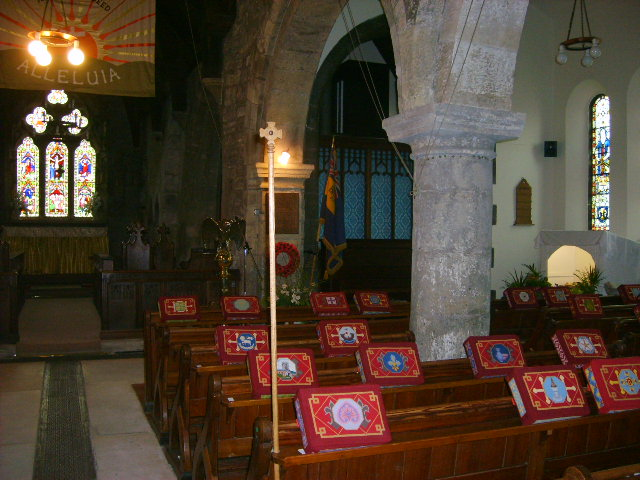
View east in the church, in 2007

The church was restored in 1717 and between 1738 and 1740, when the pulpit was replaced. The building was then partly rebuilt between 1839 and 1841, when the aisles were reconstructed, and a north porch was added, becoming the main entrance. The next reconstruction was in 1877, this later work being by C. Hodgson Fowler. In 1930, the north aisle of the chancel was converted into a chapel. Finally, in 1987, a church hall was added.

The church's stained glass is 19th and later. The east window, designed by William Wailes, dated from about 1840, but was replaced in 2009 by new glass, designed by Helen Whittaker. In the churchyard are the remains of a stone cross - its base and part of its shaft - which may date from the 14th century.

== See also ==
- Grade II* listed buildings in the City of York
- Listed buildings in Dunnington
