= All Saints Church, Bolton =

Church in Cumbria, England

Coordinates: 54.6046°N 2.5599°W

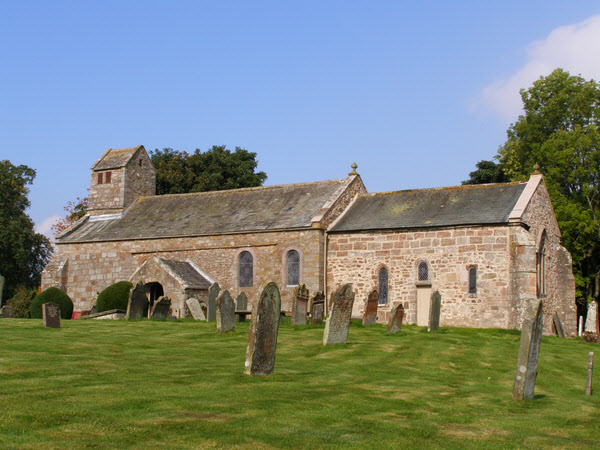
- All Saints Church, Bolton, from the southeast

- Location in Cumbria
- OS grid reference: NY 639 234
- Location: Bolton, Cumbria
- Country: England
- Denomination: Anglican
- Website: All Saints, Bolton

History
- Status: Parish church

Architecture
- Functional status: Active
- Heritage designation: Grade I
- Designated: 6 February 1968
- Architectural type: Church
- Style: Norman, Gothic

Specifications
- Materials: Stone, slate roofs

Administration
- Province: York
- Diocese: Carlisle
- Archdeaconry: Carlisle
- Deanery: Appleby
- Parish: Bolton

Clergy
- Priest: Revd Stephen Tudway

All Saints Church is in the village of Bolton, Cumbria, England. It is an active Anglican parish church in the deanery of Appleby, the archdeaconry of Carlisle, and the diocese of Carlisle. Its benefice is united with a number of others to form the North Westmorland Benefice. The church is recorded in the National Heritage List for England as a designated Grade I listed building.

== History ==
All Saints dates from the twelfth and thirteenth centuries, with later alterations. It was restored in 1848.

== Architecture ==
=== Exterior ===
The church is long and narrow, constructed in stone with slate roofs. It has a simple plan consisting of a nave, and a chancel with a south porch. On the west gable is a bellcote with a saddleback roof. Its Norman features include the south and north doorways (the north is blocked), and slit windows towards the east end of the north and south walls of the chancel.

Along the south wall of the nave are three eighteenth-century round-headed windows. In the south wall of the chancel are, in addition to the slit window, a fourteenth/fifteenth century square-headed window, and two lancet windows, one of which has been shortened to accommodate a seventeenth-century square-headed doorway. The east window has three lights.

The main south doorway in the porch has a semicircular head, carved capitals, and a hoodmould decorated with rosettes. Above the north doorway are two twelfth-century carved stones, one depicting two jousting knights, the other with an illegible inscription. Inset in the south wall to the west of the porch is an upright female effigy that was probably originally a coffin lid.

=== Interior ===
Inside the church, the semicircular chancel arch, dating from the seventeenth century, contains nineteenth century tracery. Above the chancel arch are the Royal arms of Queen Victoria. At the west end of the church is a gallery, and on the walls of the church are benefactors' boards. On the wall adjacent to the door is a poor box dated 1623. The font consists of a round bowl on a square pedestal, with a cover dated 1687.

The stained glass in the east window and in one of the windows in the south wall of the chancel is by Clayton and Bell.

== External features ==
In the churchyard is a Grade II listed table tomb to members of the Bowness family with dates in the 18th century. Also in the churchyard is a stone sundial dated 1747 set on a medieval cross-base. It is also listed at Grade II.

== See also ==
- Grade I listed churches in Cumbria
- Grade I listed buildings in Cumbria
- Listed buildings in Bolton, Cumbria
