= Grenofen =

Hamlet in Devon, England

Coordinates: 50°31′26.62″N 4°7′33.4″W

Grenofen is a hamlet in Devon. It is located about 2 miles south of Tavistock on the A386 at the southwestern edge of Dartmoor National Park. Grenofen was mentioned as Grenefenne in 1238 in the Assize Rolls for Devon.

== Geography ==
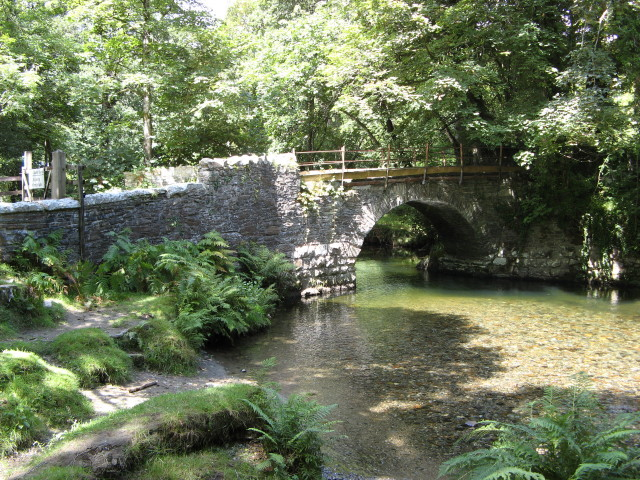
Grenofen Bridge over River Walkham

When the South Devon & Tavistock Railway was built by Brunel in the 1850s, several tunnels and bridges were necessary to cover the terrain. The most northerly tunnel of the railway was located in Grenofen. The tunnel is 374 yards long and today forms part of the Tavistock to Plymouth cycle route, part of the Drake's Trail.

Part of the track forms the Gem Bridge, crossing the River Walkham, just south of Grenofen.
