= Crossrigg Hall =

Grade II listed country house near Bolton, Cumbria

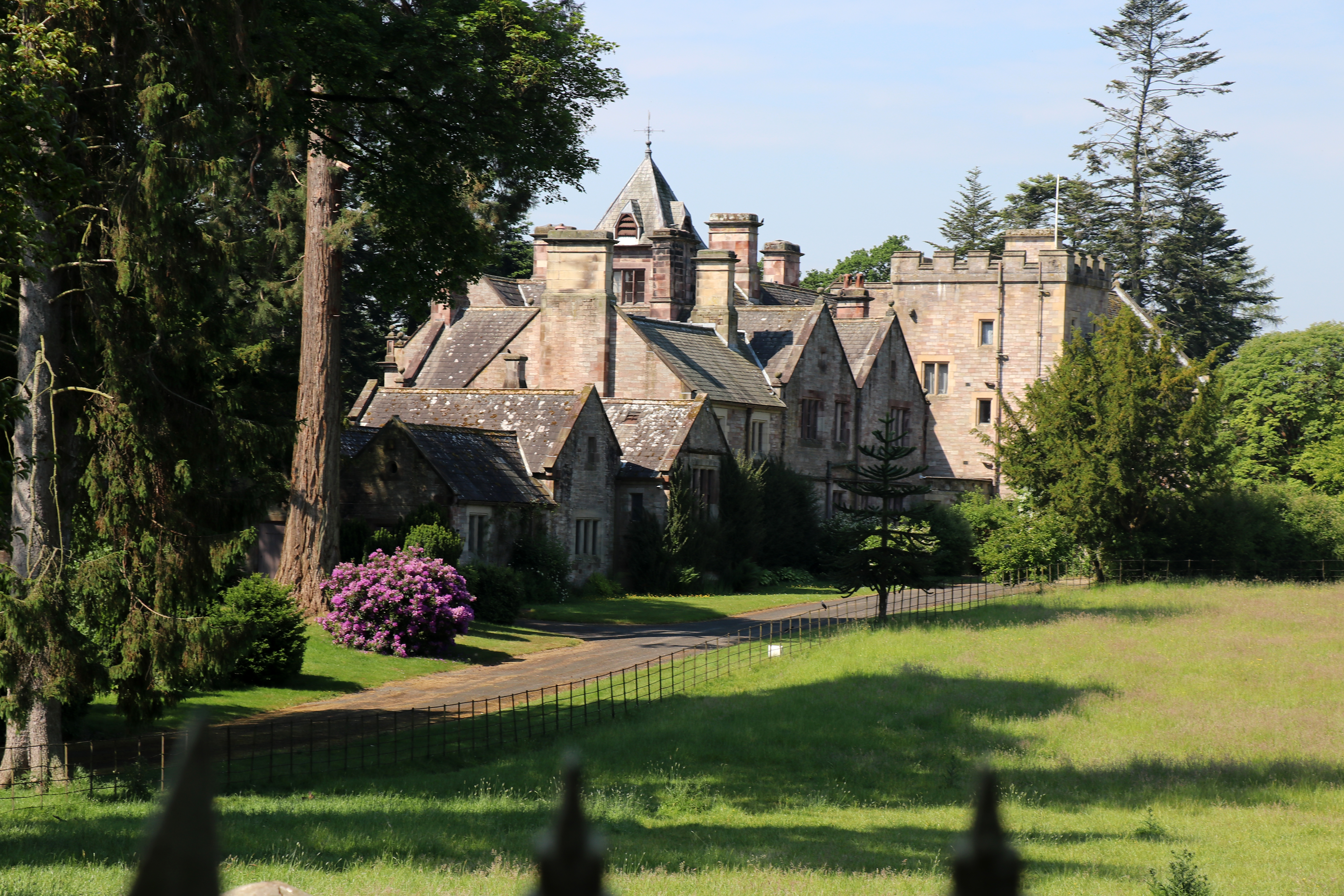

- Location within Cumbria
- 54.611°N 2.6117°W
- Type: House
- Location: Bolton, Cumbria

History
- Built: 1864

Site notes
- Architect: Anthony Salvin
- Architectural style: Jacobethan

Listed Building – Grade II*
- Official name: Crossrigg Hall
- Designated: 12 April 1984
- Reference no.: 1357502

Listed Building – Grade II
- Official name: Gate, walls and piers to main entrance at Crossrigg Hall
- Designated: 12 April 1984
- Reference no.: 1065880

Listed Building – Grade II
- Official name: Gazebo to South East of Crossrigg Hall
- Designated: 12 April 1984
- Reference no.: 1331663

Listed Building – Grade II
- Official name: Dovecote and pigsties to South East of Crossrigg Hall
- Designated: 12 April 1984
- Reference no.: 1065879

Listed Building – Grade II
- Official name: Garages, workshops and storerooms to South East of Crossrigg Hall
- Designated: 12 April 1984
- Reference no.: 1126530

Crossrigg Hall is a country house in the civil parish of Bolton, Cumbria in the northern United Kingdom. It was built in 1864 by Lieutenant Colonel Hugh Rigg of the Indian Army's Madras Infantry. Designed by Anthony Salvin, and with later additions by J. H. Martindale, the hall is a Grade II* listed building.

== History ==
Records dating from the late 1700s show a house existed on the Crossrigg property from at least the mid 18th century. In the 1787 census, Nicholas Temple, a Fleet Street wine and brandy merchant, is listed as residing at Crossrigg. By 1851 the estate was home to Robert Addison, a former East India Company trader and owner of the Jasinga tea plantation on the Island of Java, then a part of the Dutch East Indies. Addison died in 1862 and left Crossrigg to his grand nephew, Lieutenant Colonel Hugh Rigg. Hugh Rigg was a senior officer in the East India Company's 21st Madras Native Infantry and served in India, the Straits Settlement (Singapore), China and Burma (Myanmar) and as aide-de-camp to his father-in-law, General Morden Carthew. Upon inheriting Crossrigg, Rigg resigned his commission and returned to England, contracting Anthony Salvin to design a new house for the site.

The original Georgian house was demolished in 1864 and building of the new house commenced. The stables associated with the original building were retained. The Sotheby's auction catalogue from the sale of the house in 1994 records the hall as

... a compact, gabled, main block with three reception rooms, and a lower office wing to one side ... and the new house cost £7,500 to build. The principal interiors were well-proportioned with 'Tudor' rib-patterned plaster ceilings, oak joinery and marble chimneypieces; those in the dining room and drawing room of a rather French Louis XV character.

The Rigg family owned Crossrigg Hall until 1912 when, following the death of Lt Col Hugh Rigg's eldest son and inheritor of the property, the estate was acquired by a Middlesbrough iron ore dealer, Joseph Torbock. Torbock made his fortune in the Middlesbrough iron ore boom and was married to heiress, Florence Hoste Henley, daughter of Colonel H.C. Henley of Leigh House, Chard. The same family had owned the Sandringham estate in Norfolk from 1686 to 1832.

In February 1914 the Torbocks undertook renovations on the hall and, with designs prepared by J.H. Martindale, architect of renovations at Carlisle Cathedral in Cumbria, began work on enlarging the house. The main alterations were to the front entrance, the hall, where a battlement tower was added, and a new main staircase in the entrance. A gentlemen's lavatory, billiard room and porte-cochère were also added. Work was completed in January 1919.

Joseph Torbock died in 1925 and Florence in 1944. They left two unmarried sons, Richard, a Commander in the Royal Navy and Cornish a captain in the Royal Army and chartered accountant.Both sons continued to live in Crossrigg Hall until their deaths in 1993. The brothers had left the interior of the hall mostly untouched, creating an "Edwardian time capsule".

David and Anita Woods bought the hall from the Torbock estate at auction in 1994 after which it was used as a wedding venue. The property was sold in 2020 to a Cumbrian businessman, Andrew Tinkler, for £2.7 million, with plans to redevelop the site as a hotel and spa.

=== Listing designations ===
Crossrigg Hall is a Grade II* listed building. The main entrance gate, with its gatepiers and walls, walls and railings to the southeast of the house, various estate buildings including pig sties and a dovecote, and a gazebo in the gardens are all listed at Grade II.
