= Gundleton =

Village in Hampshire, England

Coordinates: 51.100000°N 1.116667°W

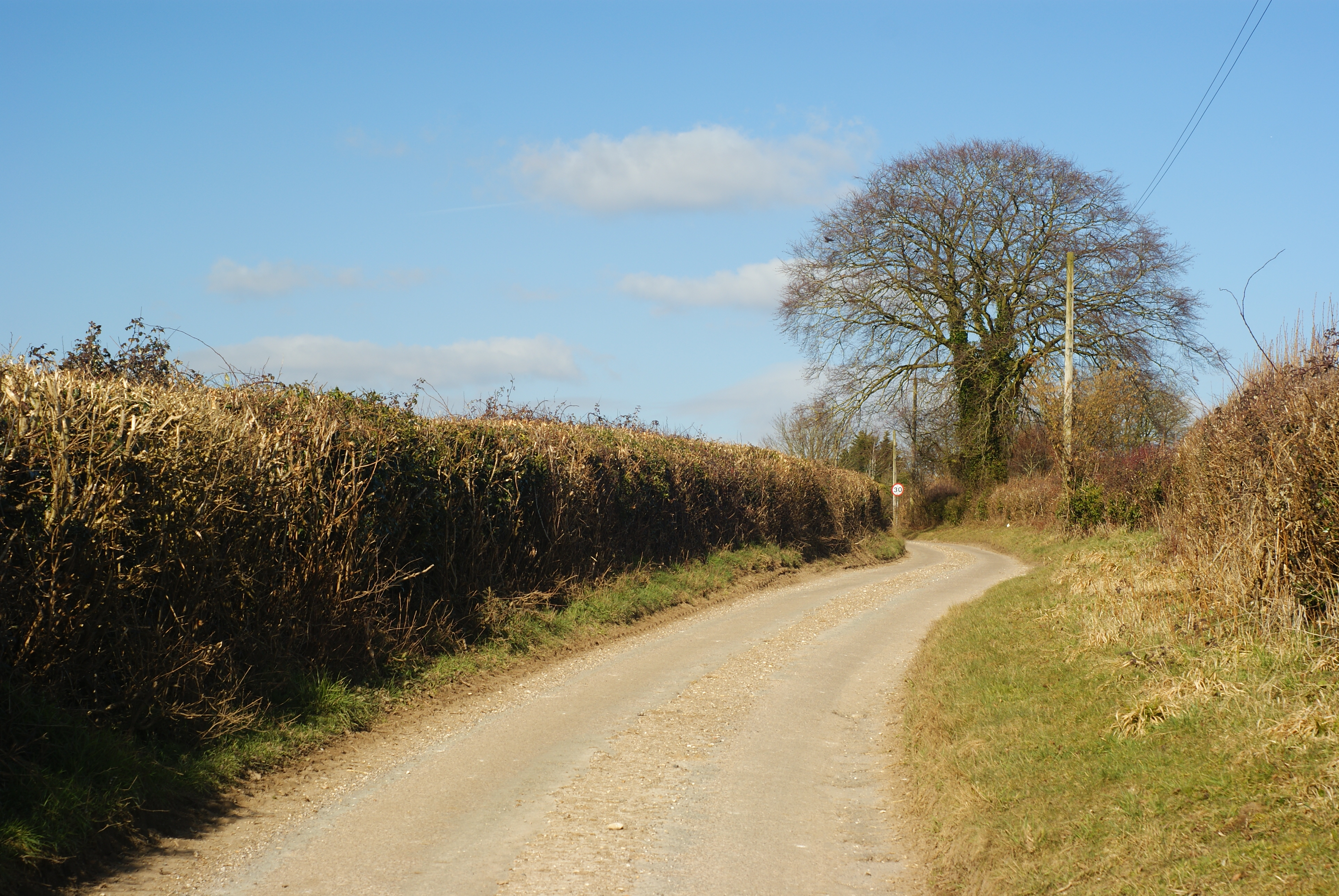
- Bighton Lane, Gundleton

- Location within Hampshire
- OS grid reference: SU6194833782
- District: Winchester
- Shire county: Hampshire
- Region: South East
- Country: England
- Sovereign state: United Kingdom
- Post town: ALRESFORD
- Postcode district: SO24
- Dialling code: 01962
- Police: Hampshire and Isle of Wight
- Fire: Hampshire and Isle of Wight
- Ambulance: South Central
- UK Parliament: Winchester

Gundleton is a village in Hampshire, England. It is in the civil parish of Bighton, and 2 miles (3.2 km) east of New Alresford.
