= Gwenter =

Hamlet in Cornwall, England

Coordinates: 50°01′06″N 5°09′25″W

Gwenter: Cornish: Gwynstir
- Hamlet
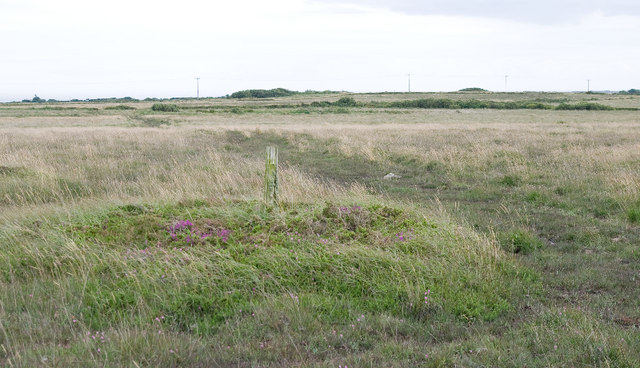
- Mounds near Gwenter, Goonhilly Downs

- Location within Cornwall
- Unitary authority: Cornwall
- Region: South West
- Country: England
- Sovereign state: United Kingdom
- Police: Devon and Cornwall
- Fire: Cornwall
- Ambulance: South Western

Gwenter (Cornish: Gwynstir, meaning land of winds) is a hamlet in the parish of St Keverne (where the 2011 census population was included), Cornwall, England.

Gwenter lies within the Cornwall Area of Outstanding Natural Beauty (AONB). Almost a third of Cornwall has AONB designation, with the same status and protection as a National Park.
