= Greenwith Common =

Coordinates: 50.219°N 5.118°W

- Location within Cornwall
- OS grid reference: SW777401
- Civil parish: Perranarworthal
- Unitary authority: Cornwall
- Ceremonial county: Cornwall
- Region: South West
- Country: England
- Sovereign state: United Kingdom
- Post town: Truro
- Postcode district: TR3

Greenwith Common is a hamlet in the parish of Perranarworthal, Cornwall, England.
