= Greenhaugh =

Coordinates: 55.1794°N 2.3232°W

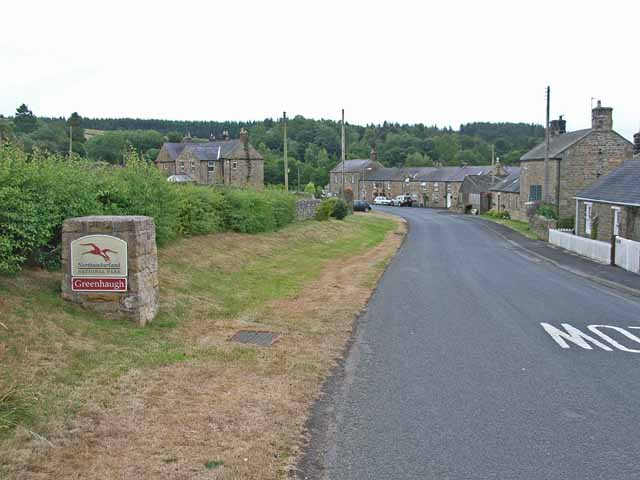
- Greenhaugh

- Location within Northumberland
- Population: 57
- OS grid reference: NY795873
- Unitary authority: Northumberland
- Ceremonial county: Northumberland
- Region: North East
- Country: England
- Sovereign state: United Kingdom
- Post town: HEXHAM
- Postcode district: NE48
- Police: Northumbria
- Fire: Northumberland
- Ambulance: North East
- UK Parliament: Hexham

Greenhaugh is a small village in Northumberland, England. It is located northwest of Bellingham and borders the Northumberland National Park. It is in the parish of Tarset.

== Governance ==
Greenhaugh is in the parliamentary constituency of Hexham.
