= Grudie =

Coordinates: 57.61656°N 4.83307°W

Grudie: Scottish Gaelic: Grùididh
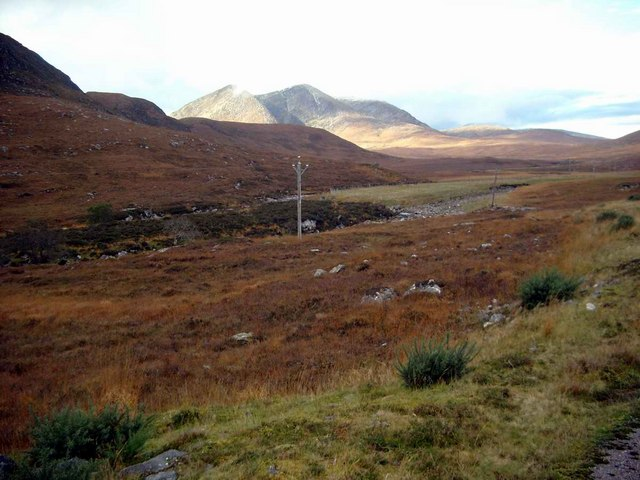
- Grudie Glen to the north of Grudie

- Location within the Ross and Cromarty area
- OS grid reference: NH308620
- Council area: Highland
- Country: Scotland
- Sovereign state: United Kingdom
- Post town: Garve
- Postcode district: IV23 2
- Police: Scotland
- Fire: Scottish
- Ambulance: Scottish

Grudie (Grùididh in Scottish Gaelic) is a village, situated between Loch a' Chuilinn and Loch Luichart with the River Bran flowing past Grudie east to west, in Ross-shire, Scottish Highlands and is in the Scottish council area of Highland.

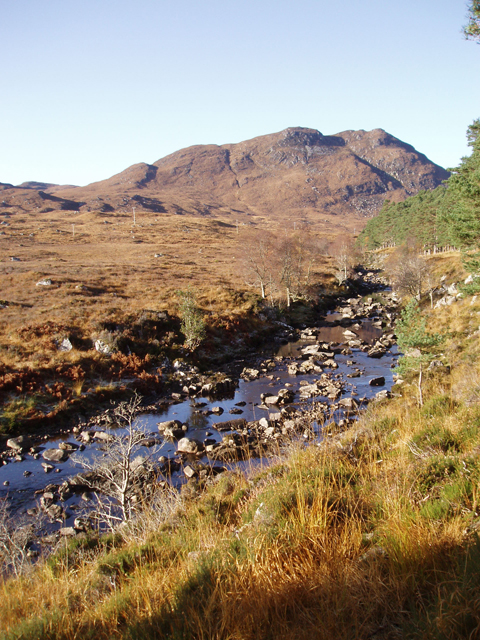
River Crudie flowing down from Glen Grudie

The River Grudie (Abhainn Ghrùididh in Scottish Gaelic) flows into the River Bran, from the north, at Grudie. Grudie Power Station is situated at Grudie, taking water from several lochs, principally Loch Fannich through a tunnel emerging 0.5 miles from the station where a pipe network delivers it to the station. The outflow of the station flows into the River Grudie.
