= Green Bank (Texas) =

Former commercial bank in Texas

Green Bancorp, Inc.
- Company type: Public
- Traded as: Nasdaq: GNBC
- Industry: Banking
- Founded: 1999; 27 years ago
- Fate: Acquired by Veritex Holdings, Inc.
- Headquarters: Houston, Texas
- Key people: Manuel J. Mehos CPA (chairman and CEO)
- Revenue: $190.8 million (2017)
- Number of employees: 368
- Parent: Green Bancorp, Inc.
- Website: www.greenbank.com

Green Bank was a nationally chartered commercial bank headquartered in Houston, Texas. It was founded in 1999 and acquired by Veritex Community Bank in 2018. The bank had branches in Texas and Kentucky. The bank offered traditional banking services such as checking accounts and savings accounts. In addition, it offered various consumer loans, such as residential real estate loans, home equity loans, installment loans, unsecured and secured personal lines of credit, overdraft protection, and letters of credit. The company also provided a range of online banking services, including access to account balances, online transfers, online bill payment, and electronic delivery of customer statements; and extended drive-through hours, and ATMs, as well as banking through telephone, mail, and personal appointment.

The holding company, Green Bancorp, Inc., was created on December 31, 2006 with the acquisition of Redstone Bank in Houston. In 2018, the parent companies of Green Bank and Veritex Community Bank combined in an all-stock deal valued at $1 billion.
