= Greenside, Mpumalanga =

Greenside
- Location within Mpumalanga Location within South Africa
- Coordinates: 25.001°S 28.730°E
- Country: South Africa
- Province: Mpumalanga
- District: Nkangala
- Municipality: Dr JS Moroka

Racial makeup (2011)

First languages (2011)
- Time zone: UTC+2 (SAST)
- Postal code (street): 2193
- PO box: 2034

Greenside is a town in Nkangala District Municipality in the Mpumalanga province of South Africa, 60 km west of Siyabuswa.
