= Greenside School =

Greenside School may refer to:

- Greenside High School, public co-educational high school in Johannesburg, Gauteng, South Africa.
- Greenside Primary School, a coeducational primary school in Hammersmith, London, England
