= Greenbank (surname) =

Greenbank is a surname. Notable people with the surname include:

- Caroline Greenbank Boughton (1854-1905), American educator and social activist
- Harry Greenbank (1865–1899), English writer and dramatist
- Kelly Greenbank (born 1955), Canadian-born Austrian ice hockey player
- Luke Greenbank (born 1997), British swimmer
- Percy Greenbank (1878–1968), English lyricist
