= Grimston, York =

Coordinates: 53.9557°N 1.0151°W

Grimston
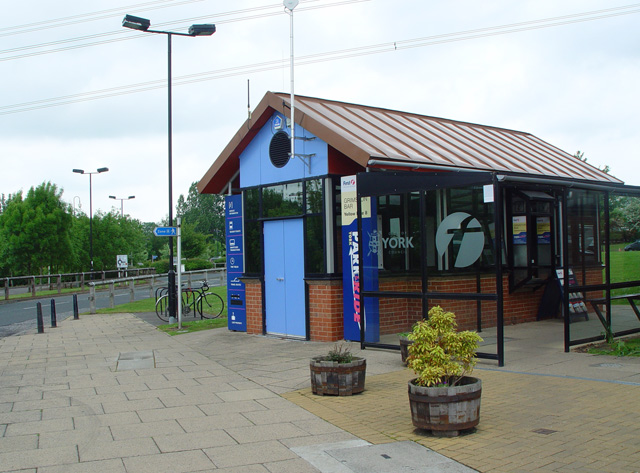
- Grimston Bar Park and Ride

- Location within North Yorkshire
- Civil parish: Dunnington
- Unitary authority: York
- Ceremonial county: North Yorkshire
- Region: Yorkshire and the Humber
- Country: England
- Sovereign state: United Kingdom

Grimston is a hamlet in the civil parish of Dunnington, in the York district, in the ceremonial county of North Yorkshire, England. It is 3 miles east of York city centre. Until 1974 it was in the East Riding of Yorkshire. From 1974 to 1996 it was in the Selby District. In 1931 the parish had a population of 66.

== History ==
The name "Grimston" means 'Grimr's farm/settlement'. Grimston was recorded in the Domesday Book as Grimeston/Grimestone. Grimston was formerly a township in the parish of Dunnington, in 1866 Grimston became a separate civil parish, on 1 April 1935 the parish was abolished and merged with Dunnington.

Grimston is a possible shrunken medieval village. It may have had a moat and church but heavy ploughing around the present settlement has destroyed the earthwork evidence. A Chapel garth was mentioned in 1606 though there is no conformation of a chapel being at Grimston in the Middle Ages.
