= George Alfred Carthew =

English antiquarian and local historian

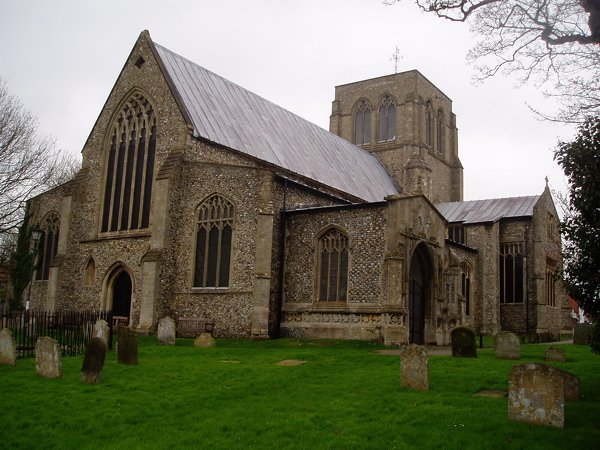
The Church of St Nicholas, East Dereham. Carthew worked in East Dereham for most his life, and published several works on the history of town and its church.

George Alfred Carthew (20 June 1807 – 21 October 1882) was an English antiquarian, local historian, and genealogist, though he worked as a solicitor for most of his life.

== Early life and legal career ==
Carthew was born on 20 June 1807, in Redenhall with Harleston, Norfolk, to the solicitor George Carthew (1777–1861) and his wife Anne (1785–1858), daughter of Peter Isaack of Wighton. His family could trace its lineage back to St Issey, Cornwall, where they resided until Thomas Carthew (Carthew's great-grandfather) inherited Benacre Hall in Suffolk in the early-18th-century.

Carthew grew up as the eldest of three sons, rarely attending school owing to his family's financial hardships, instead working as an apprentice in his father's office. Here he was allowed to access a large collection of genealogical documents in his father's collection, which instilled in him "the remarkable faculty for genealogical and historical research which he exhibited throughout a long life", according to Gordon Goodwin of the Dictionary of National Biography (DNB). One particular collection was a stack of charters from Mendham Priory, Suffolk, which he spent several years deciphering, transcribing, and analysing. Carthew mastered their contents to such a degree that in 1837, he correctly addressed several errors in their interpretation in a letter to the senior antiquarian John Adey Repton, published in The Gentleman's Magazine.

In 1830, Carthew qualified as a solicitor, after working in Framlingham for nine years. He continued his partnership with his father while in Harleston, after which he accepted a partnership in East Dereham where he worked for the rest of his life.

== Antiquarian career ==
Inspired by his early work with his father's charters, Carthew was a passionate antiquarian all his life. He and his father were early members of the Norfolk and Norwich Archaeological Society, and Carthew became one of the first local secretaries of the organisation. Carthew was a frequent contributor to the society's journal, Norfolk Archaeology, publishing, among other papers, an article on East Dereham church in the first volume, and extracts from the antiquarian Peter Le Neve's diary (which had passed through his family after Thomas Martin of Palgrave, husband of Le Neve's widow, had gifted it to his grandfather) accompanied by his extensive genealogical notes. Goodwin lists Carthew's most important contributions as "On the Right of Wardship and the Ceremony of Homage and Fealty in the Feudal Times" (Norfolk Archaeology. 4: 286–91) and "North Creake Abbey" (Norfolk Archaeology. 7: 153–68).

In February 1854, Carthew was elected a Fellow of the Society of Antiquaries of London. He often contributed to its periodicals. Upon George Henry Dashwood's death in 1869, he was one of the antiquarians responsible for bringing his edition of the first volume of William Hervy's 1563 Visitation of Norfolk to publication in 1878. After Carthew's death, two unfinished works of his were prepared for publications by his close friend Augustus Jessopp: A History of the Parishes of West and East Bradenham (1883) and The Origin of Family or Sur-Names (1883).

Carthew's primary antiquarian work was The Hundred of Launditch and Deanery of Brisley in the County of Norfolk, published in three parts between 1877 and 1879, near the end of his life. This work was the product of forty years of work, frequently hampered by poor health and financial hardship. The publication of the work was costly for Carthew, as it was only privately circulated, but it met with much praise from local historians. Walter Rye in his Index to Norfolk Topography (1881) praised Carthew extensively as:

entitled to the worthy distinction of having written and printed the amplest and best history of any [Norfolk] hundred ever published. Of his industry it will be enough to say that his "History of Launditch", a hundred which in [Francis] Blomefield fills 163 pp. 8vo., takes up as much printed matter as would fill ten times as many [sections of Blomefield's book] of the same size, or, roughly speaking, three whole vol[ume]s, of the 8vo. ed. of Blomefield.

Similarly, Goodwin in Carthew's 1887 DNB entry, notes that "this admirable specimen of a county history, skilfully arranged and skilfully executed, illustrated by lithographs, plans, and facsimiles, is unrivalled for the completeness of the manorial descents."

== Personal life and death ==
On 9 July 1856, Carthew married his first cousin Anna (1806–1877), daughter of Morden Carthew, vicar of Mattishall. Anna had earlier been married to Captain George Gray, an officer and family friend of the Carthews. Anna's death in 1877 (the parish records her burial on 4 September) dealt a significant personal blow to Carthew; he became slow to complete his projects and often fell ill. Around this time, Jessopp promised Carthew that he would put his unfinished material in press in the event of his untimely death.

On 21 October 1882, Carthew died in his sleep, lying in his chair in his home at Millfield House (on Quebec Road, East Dereham). He was buried on 25 October in the family vault at Redenhall Church, next to his wife and parents. He left a sum of £6180 11s 2d in his will, worth approximately £409,058 in 2017 GBP.
