= Wellington to Nantwich Railway =

Railway line in England

The Wellington to Nantwich Railway was a railway line that ran from the Wellington to Nantwich via Market Drayton. The line closed in 1967 to all traffic and the track was dismantled in 1970. The line also connected to the former Stoke-Market Drayton Line at Market Drayton which was a junction station for the line until the closure to Madeley Chord in 1956.

== Wellington and Drayton Railway ==
The Wellington and Drayton Railway was incorporated on 7 August 1862, and in November of that year deposited plans for a line connecting Wellington to Market Drayton, together with extensions northwards towards Manchester, to join the LNWR near Minshull Vernon, the Cheshire Midland Railway near Knutsford, the Manchester South Junction and Altrincham Railway and the Bolton Railway at Salford, to provide the Great Western Railway with access to Manchester. Additionally there were plans for a branch from Market Drayton to Newcastle-under-Lyme, but these were abandoned due to opposition from the LNWR and North Staffordshire Railway.

Circumstances changed rapidly, and alliance with the Nantwich and Market Drayton Railway together with running powers from Nantwich to Crewe and onwards to Manchester through amalgamation of the Great Western Railway with the West Midland Railway meant that the northern extensions were no longer needed by the GWR for access to Manchester.

The line ran from Drayton Junction (52.7031°N 2.5317°W), on the Shrewsbury and Wellington Joint Line just west of Wellington station, to an end-on junction with the Nantwich and Market Drayton Railway at Market Drayton (52.9093°N 2.4895°W), a distance of some 16 miles. Construction started in 1864, and the line was opened in 1867. The Consulting Engineer was John Fowler.

After the first meeting at Malvern, Worcestershire, all subsequent Directors' Meetings were held at Paddington station, with Directors supplied by the GWR, and an Act of 14 July 1864 authorised the transfer of the Wellington and Drayton Railway to the GWR on completion of the line. However, this transfer was not formally sealed until 30 August 1877.

== Nantwich and Market Drayton Railway ==
The company was provisionally formed in 1860 as the Market Drayton and Madeley Railway, then changed its name to Nantwich and Market Drayton Railway on or before 3 April 1861, and incorporated in June 1861. The first Chairman was Reginald Corbet, of nearby Adderley Hall.

The single track line was built from the London and North Western Railway (LNWR) Crewe and Shrewsbury Railway line just south of Nantwich to a terminus at Market Drayton, a distance of ten miles. Construction started in 1862 and the line opened in October 1863.

Proposals were for the railway to be worked by the LNWR, but instead the Great Western Railway took on this role and worked the nominally independent line until it was taken over by the GWR in 1897.

The line was doubled during 1866–67, to match the Wellington and Drayton Railway which opened in October 1867, thus providing a link for the GWR between the Midlands and the Northwest.

== Stoke Railway ==
The North Staffordshire Railway line from Stoke to Market Drayton opened in January 1870, joining the line at Silverdale Junction, just north of Market Drayton. This closed to all traffic from Market Drayton to Madeley Chord in 1956.

== Traffic ==
Traffic along the route was surprisingly very high and so were the passenger numbers even during the railmotor years with the halts along the line at Coole Pilate, Coxbank, Little Drayton, Wollerton, Ellerdine, Rowton and Longdon.

The stations on the line were Crudgington, Peplow, Hodnet, Tern Hill, Market Drayton, Adderley and Audlem.

== Closure ==
Passenger services ceased on to Newcastle-Under-Lyme and Stoke-On-Trent in 1956. Passenger services continued to Nantwich and Wellington until 1963 when the service ceased following the Beeching Axe. Traffic continued to pass through Market Drayton until 1967 when the line from Wellington to Nantwich ceased operation and the track was dismantled in 1970.

== Present day ==
The line has been converted into a footpath from Wellington to near the site of Hodnet station, from there. The trackbed has returned to agricultural use and the Drayton Bypass now uses a section of the line from Tern Hill to Market Drayton. The site of Market Drayton station is now a Morrison's supermarket and a factory complex has occupied a section of the station site and trackbed although the former tunnel can still be seen from Morrison's. The trackbed to Audlem is now agriculture and is mostly intact to Nantwich.

== Nantwich and Market Drayton Railway Society ==
On New Year's Day 1992, The Market Drayton Railway Preservation Society (renamed Nantwich & Market Drayton Railway Society in 2010) was set up in order to preserve what remained of the old railway line between Nantwich and Market Drayton on the Cheshire–Shropshire Border.

A new site would have to required for Market Drayton as the old site no longer exists now being a supermarket, while other parts of the line between Coxbank and Audlem have changed slightly since the line's closure.

As of April 2012, the society held meetings most months to provide talks about how a part of the line could be preserved.

The society have not been able to get backing from local councils due to the safety concerns of reopening a level crossing near Audlem.
