= Market Drayton railway station =

Disused railway station in Shropshire, England

Market Drayton
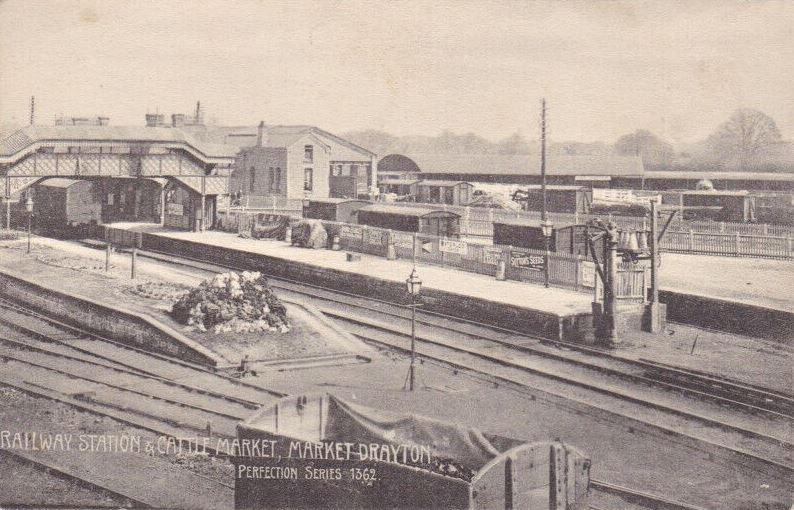
- Market Drayton station during operation

General information
- Location: Market Drayton, Shropshire; England
- Coordinates: 52.9095°N 2.4891°W
- Grid reference: SJ671348
- Platforms: 4

Other information
- Status: Disused

History
- Original company: Nantwich and Market Drayton Railway
- Pre-grouping: Great Western Railway
- Post-grouping: Great Western Railway

Key dates
- 20 October 1863: Station and line from Nantwich opened
- 16 October 1867: Line from Wellington opened
- 1 February 1870: Line from Silverdale opened
- 7 May 1956: Line from Silverdale closed
- 9 September 1963: Station closed to passengers
- 1 May 1967: Wellington and Nantwich lines closed
Location

Market Drayton railway station served the town of Market Drayton in Shropshire, England, between 1863 and 1963. It was at the junction where three railway lines met: two of them, forming the Great Western Railway route between Wellington and Crewe, were met by a line from Stoke-on-Trent on the North Staffordshire Railway.

== History ==
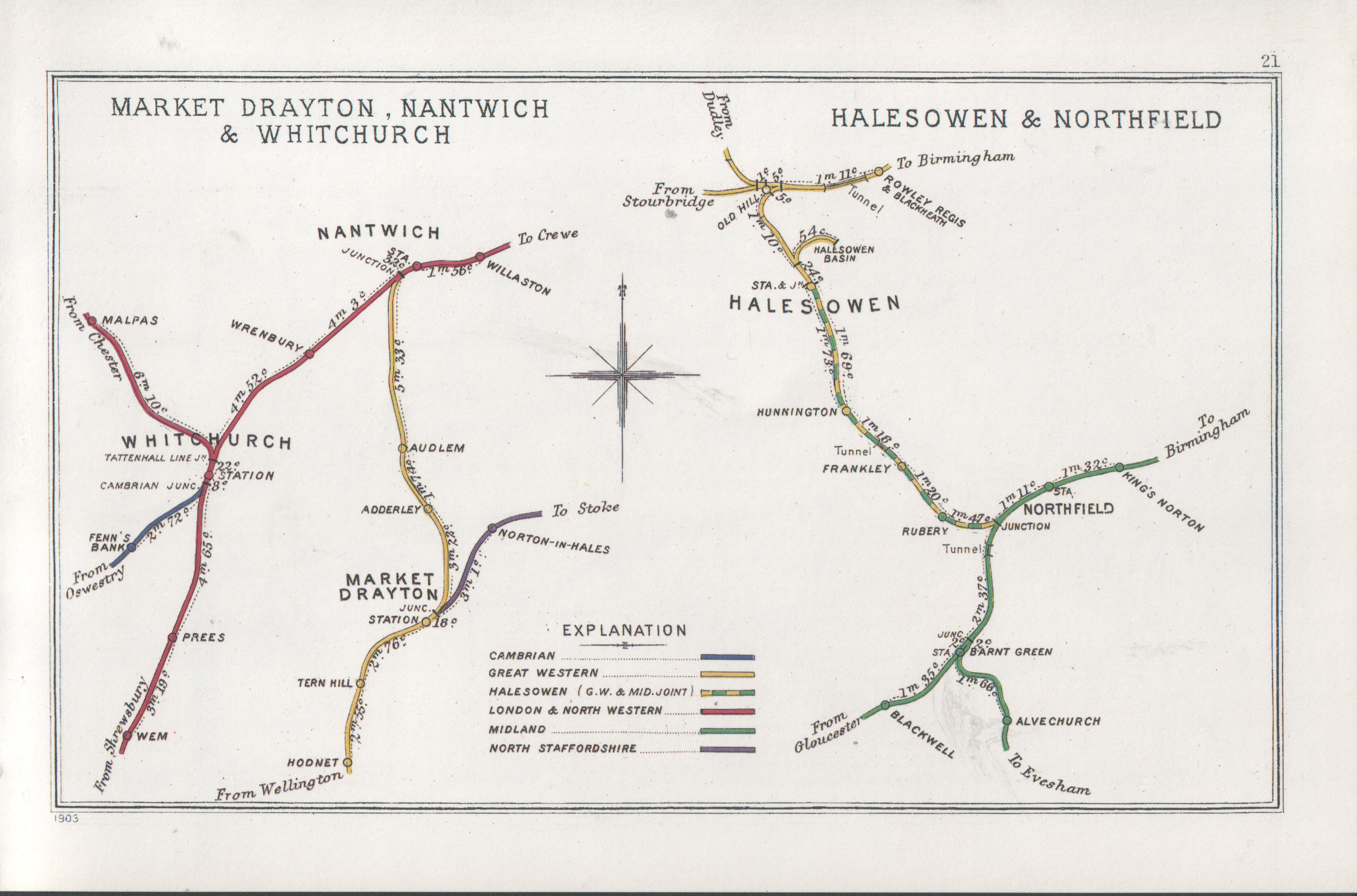
A 1903 Railway Clearing House Junction Diagram showing (left) railways in the vicinity of Market Drayton

The Nantwich and Market Drayton Railway (N&MDR), which ran southwards to Market Drayton from a junction with the London and North Western Railway (LNWR) at Nantwich, was opened on 20 October 1863. The new line was 10 miles 65 chains (17.4 km) long.

Four years later, on 16 October 1867, the Wellington and Drayton Railway (W&DR) opened, which connected the N&MDR at Market Drayton to the Great Western Railway (GWR) at Wellington. The W&DR, which was 16 miles 12 chains (26.0 km) in length, had been absorbed by the GWR in 1866, the N&MDR had been worked by the GWR since opening (it was fully absorbed in 1897); and so the connection permitted GWR trains from Wolverhampton and the south to reach Crewe and Manchester (London Road) via the LNWR.

On 1 February 1870, the North Staffordshire Railway (NSR) opened a line to Market Drayton from Silverdale. With the arrival of the NSR, the station had to be enlarged and was rebuilt in a French Renaissance style with ornamental iron features and square-topped pavilions at each end.

The opening of the NSR line was also accompanied by reciprocal running powers. The NSR gained running powers to Wellington (for goods traffic) and Hodnet (passengers and cattle) and the GWR had running powers for freight traffic to Stoke on Trent. The NSR also built its own small engine shed at Market Drayton which lasted until 1931.

The line from Silverdale closed on 7 May 1956, and the station closed when the line between Wellington and Nantwich closed on 9 September 1963. The line had been listed in Section 6 of the Beeching report as a line whose passenger services were under consideration for withdrawal before the formulation of the report, and Market Drayton station was listed in Section 7 as a passenger station already under consideration for closure before the formulation of the report. Freight services continued to use the route for a further four years until 1 May 1967.

The station site, which was situated to the east on the A529 Adderley Road, near the present site of Morrisons supermarket, is now covered by a factory complex. The idea of converting the trackbed of the Wellington to Nantwich line into a footpath was rejected by Cheshire County Council which considered it not "particularly attractive for walkers". In 1994 the site was sold for supermarket redevelopment, but the Nantwich and Market Drayton Railway Society was able to dismantle some of the buildings and artefacts.

=== Stationmasters ===
- John Pearson Collett 1866 - 1875 (afterwards station master at Salisbury, then Weymouth)
- Richard Henry Lea 1879 - 1913 (formerly station master at Hodnet)
- Samuel Alfred Curtis 1914 - 1929
- J.W. Thompson 1929 - 1936
- Mr. Griffen from 1936 (formerly station master at Berrington)
- A.C. Weaver from 1942 (formerly station master at Corwen)
- Francis Burley ca. 1965

Preceding station	Disused railways	Following station
Adderley; Line and station closed	Great Western Railway; Nantwich and Market Drayton Railway	Little Drayton Halt; Line and station closed
Terminus	North Staffordshire Railway; Stoke to Market Drayton Line	Norton-in-Hales; Line and station closed
