= Wrenbury railway station =

Railway station in Cheshire, England

Coordinates: 53.020°N 2.596°W

Wrenbury
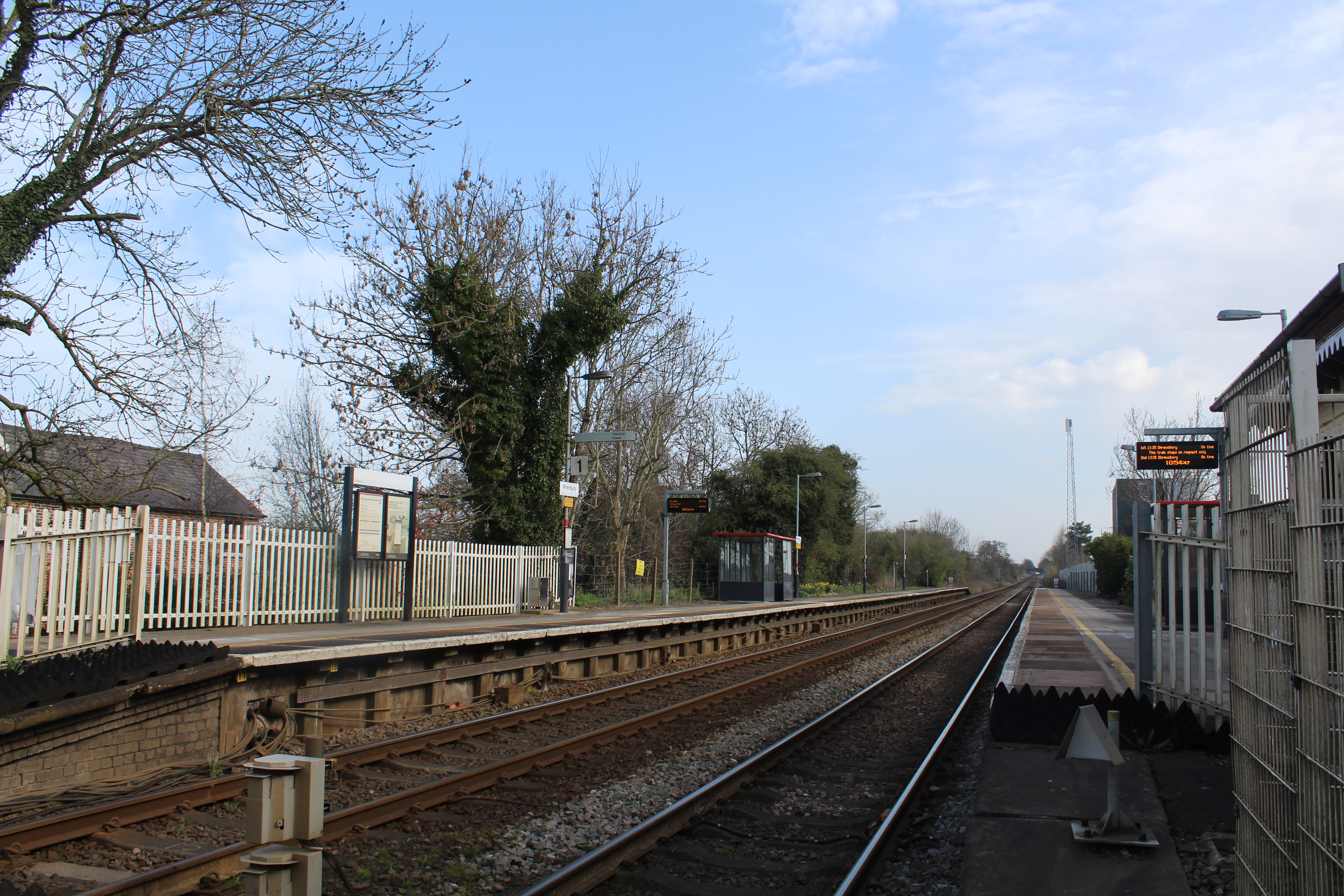
- Wrenbury Station in 2021

General information
- Location: Wrenbury, Cheshire East; England
- Grid reference: SJ601470
- Manager: Transport for Wales
- Platforms: 2

Other information
- Station code: WRE
- Classification: DfT category F2

History
- Opened: 1858

Passengers
- 2021/22: ▲5,782
- 2022/23: ▲8,112
- 2023/24: ▲10,054
- 2024/25: ▲11,238
- 2025/26: ▲12,544
Location
Notes
- Passenger statistics from the Office of Rail and Road

Wrenbury railway station serves the village of Wrenbury in Cheshire, England and is on the Welsh Marches Line 9 miles (14 km) south west of Crewe. It is an unstaffed, request-stop station with two platforms.

== History ==
The station was opened along with the line in September 1858 by the Crewe and Shrewsbury Railway.

Prior to the resignalling of the line in 2013, the barrier level crossing at the south end was controlled from an ex-LNWR pattern signal box, which operated manual semaphore signals. The station also has a small single storey main building (now disused) on the same side of the line but north of the crossing. The signal box has since been removed and the crossing is now remotely supervised from the South Wales Rail Operating Centre in Cardiff.

== Facilities ==
All tickets from here must be bought on the train or in advance, as no ticket facilities are available. Shelters are located on each platform, along with a payphone on platform 1. Train running information is offered via CIS screens, customer help points and timetable poster boards. Step-free access is provided to both platforms, though access is via narrow gates.

== Services ==
On Mondays to Saturdays (including bank holidays), there is a two-hourly service northbound to Crewe and southbound to Shrewsbury, with a few longer distance trains calling at the beginning and end of service (two stopping trains also continue to Swansea via the Heart of Wales Line on weekdays only). On Sundays there is infrequent service (four trains northbound, six southbound) with southbound journeys continuing to Cardiff Central and northbound trains continuing to Manchester Piccadilly.

Preceding station	National Rail	Following station
Whitchurch	Transport for Wales; Welsh Marches Line	Nantwich
