= Willaston railway station =

Disused railway station in Cheshire, England

Willaston
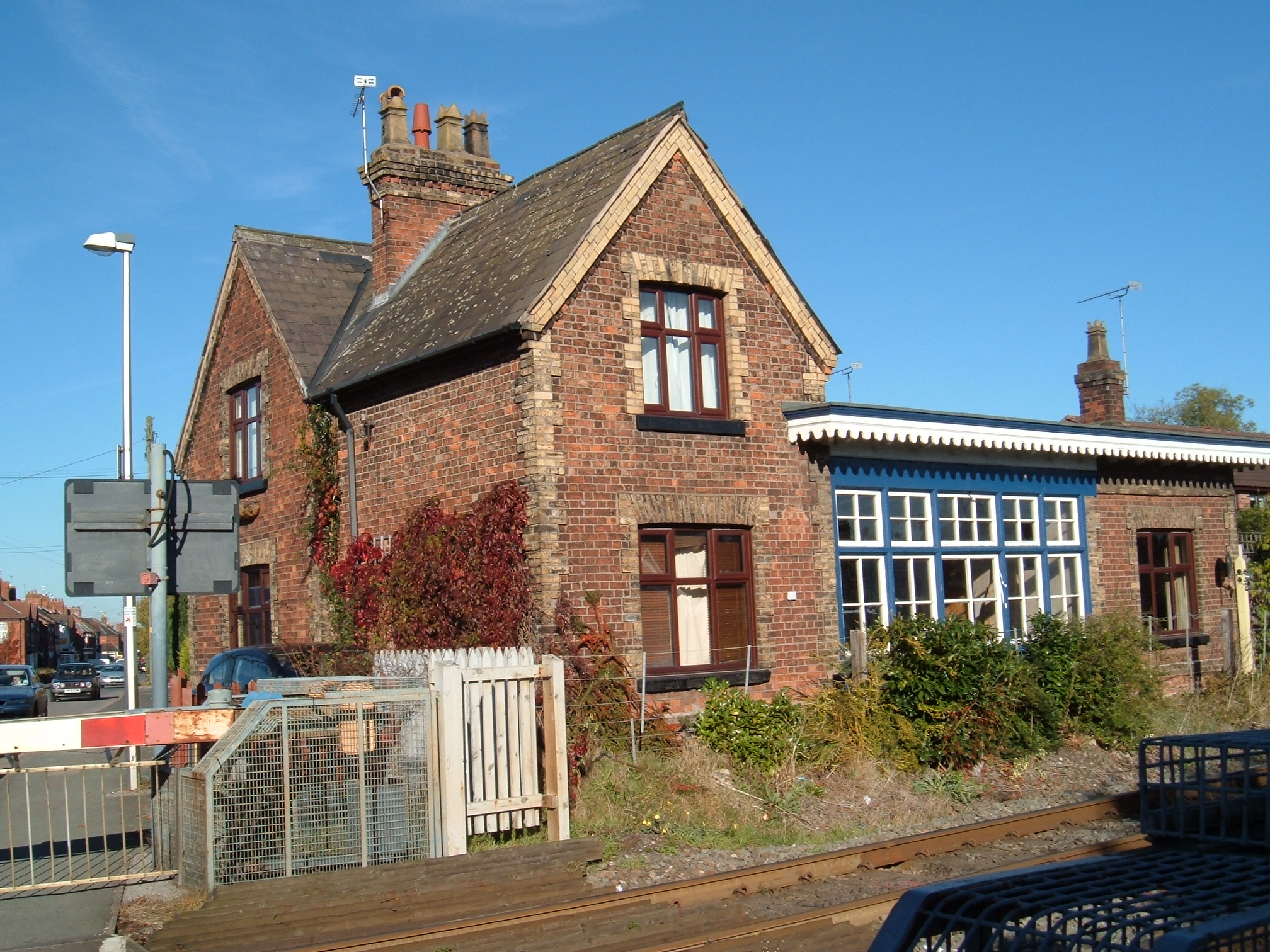
- The former station building at Willaston

General information
- Location: Willaston, Cheshire East; England
- Coordinates: 53.0670°N 2.4789°W
- Grid reference: SJ679523

Other information
- Status: Disused

History
- Original company: London and North Western Railway
- Pre-grouping: London and North Western Railway
- Post-grouping: London, Midland and Scottish Railway

Key dates
- 1858: Opened
- 1954: Closed
Location

Willaston railway station was located on the eastern side of Wistaston Road, in Willaston, Cheshire East, England. The station was opened by the London and North Western Railway in 1858, and closed to passengers in December 1954.

A proposal was put forward in 2013 to reopen the station.

| Preceding station | Disused railways | Following station |
|---|---|---|
| Newcastle Crossing; Line open, station closed | London and North Western Railway; Crewe and Shrewsbury Railway | Gresty; Line open, station closed |
| Nantwich; Line and station open | London, Midland and Scottish Railway; Crewe and Shrewsbury Railway | Crewe; Line open, station closed |
