= Newcastle station =

Newcastle station can refer to:

- Miramichi station, a railway station that serves Newcastle, New Brunswick, Canada
- Newcastle railway station, also known as Newcastle Central Station, the main railway station in the city of Newcastle upon Tyne, England
- Newcastle railway station, a former railway terminus in Newcastle, New South Wales, Australia
- Newcastle Interchange, the current railway station in Newcastle, New South Wales, Australia
- Newcastle-under-Lyme railway station, in Newcastle-under-Lyme, Staffordshire, England (closed 1964)
- Newcastle Crossing railway station, former station closed in 1918
- Newcastle station (California), a station in Newcastle, California
