= Little Drayton Halt railway station =

Disused railway station in Shropshire, England

Little Drayton Halt

General information
- Location: Market Drayton, Shropshire; England
- Coordinates: 52.9022°N 2.5069°W
- Grid reference: SJ660340
- Platforms: 2

Other information
- Status: Disused

History
- Post-grouping: Great Western Railway

Key dates
- 14 September 1935: Opened
- 6 October 1941: Closed
Location

Little Drayton Halt railway station was a station in Market Drayton, Shropshire, England. The station was opened in 1935 and closed on 6 October 1941.

Preceding station	Disused railways	Following station
Market Drayton; Line and station closed	Great Western Railway; Wellington and Drayton Railway	Tern Hill; Line and station closed
