= Gresty railway station =

Disused railway station in Crewe, Cheshire

Gresty

General information
- Location: Crewe, Cheshire; England
- Coordinates: 53.0781°N 2.4421°W
- Grid reference: SJ704535

Other information
- Status: Disused

History
- Original company: London & North Western Railway
- Pre-grouping: London & North Western Railway

Key dates
- 2 January 1911: Opened
- 1 April 1918: Closed
Location

Gresty railway station served the town of Crewe, Cheshire, England, from 1911 to 1918 on the Crewe and Shrewsbury Railway.

== History ==
The station was opened on 2 January 1911 by the London & North Western Railway. It closed on 1 April 1918. The Railway Clearing House handbook showed it as a halt in their 1921 list of closures.

| Preceding station | Historical railways | Following station |
|---|---|---|
| Crewe; Line and station open | London & North Western Railway; Crewe and Shrewsbury Railway | Willaston; Line open, station closed |
