= Coole Pilate Halt railway station =

Disused railway station in Cheshire, England

Coole Pilate Halt

General information
- Location: Coole Pilate, Cheshire East; England
- Coordinates: 53.0147°N 2.5251°W
- Grid reference: SJ647465
- Platforms: 2

Other information
- Status: Disused

History
- Post-grouping: Great Western Railway

Key dates
- 17 August 1935: Opened
- 9 September 1963: Closed
Location

Coole Pilate Halt railway station was located in Coole Pilate, Cheshire, England. The station was opened by the Great Western Railway, the station closed on 9 September 1963.

Preceding station	Disused railways	Following station
Nantwich; Line closed, station open	Great Western Railway; Nantwich and Market Drayton Railway	Audlem; Line and station closed
