= Coxbank Halt railway station =

Disused railway station in Cheshire, England

Coxbank Halt

General information
- Location: Coxbank, Audlem, Cheshire East; England
- Coordinates: 52.9725°N 2.5153°W
- Grid reference: SJ654418
- Platforms: 2

Other information
- Status: Disused

History
- Post-grouping: Great Western Railway

Key dates
- 23 June 1934: Opened
- 9 September 1963: Closed
Location

Coxbank Halt railway station was on the Nantwich to Market Drayton line near the hamlet of Coxbank, to the south of Audlem, Cheshire, England. The station was opened by the Great Western Railway in 1934 and closed when passenger services ceased on 9 September 1963.

Preceding station	Disused railways	Following station
Audlem; Line and station closed	Great Western Railway; Nantwich and Market Drayton Railway	Adderley; Line and station closed
