= Audlem railway station =

Disused railway station in Cheshire, England

Coordinates: 52.98300°N 2.51680°W

Audlem
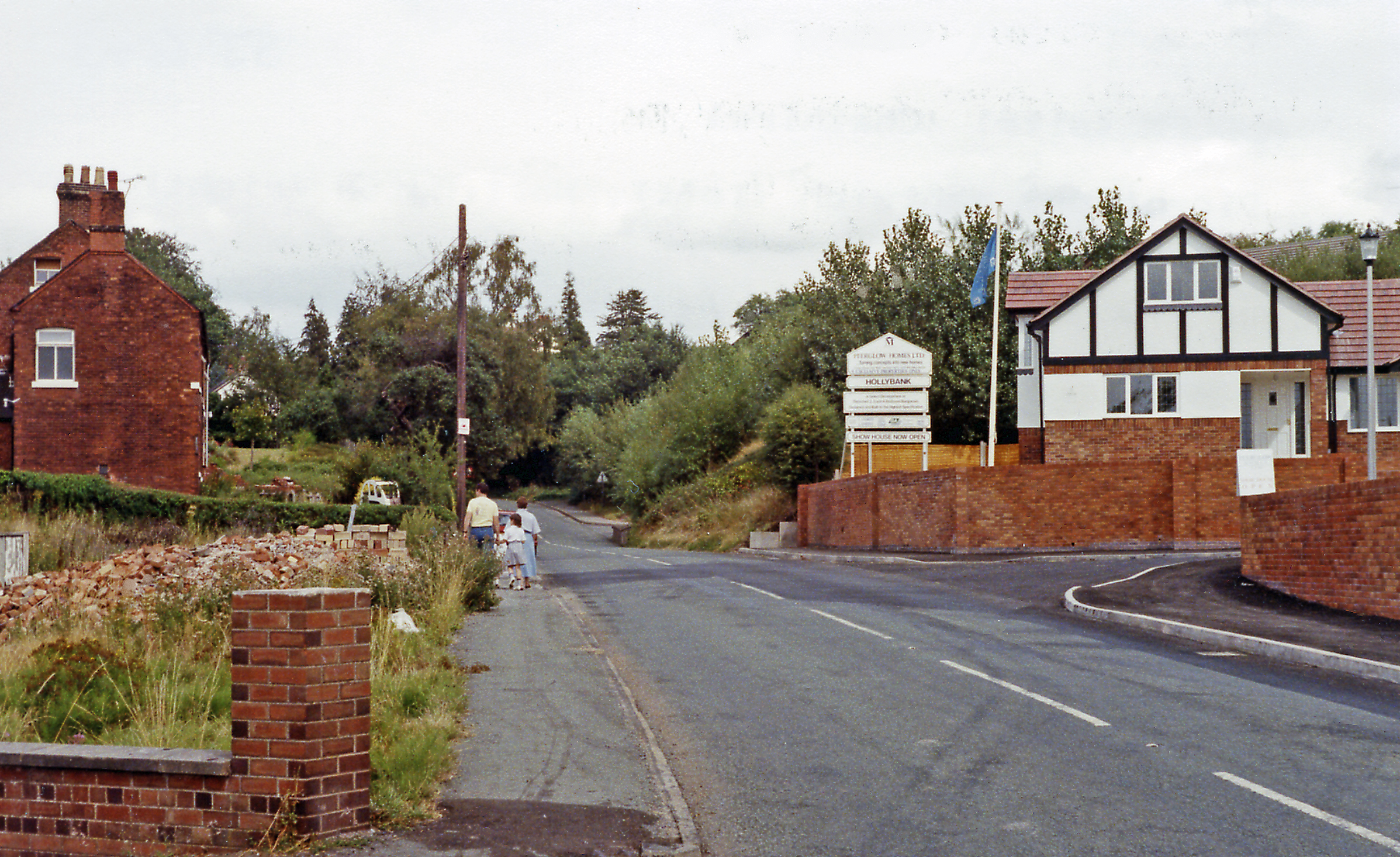
- The station's location (1990)

General information
- Location: Audlem, Cheshire East; England
- Platforms: 2

Other information
- Status: Disused

History
- Original company: Nantwich and Market Drayton Railway
- Pre-grouping: Great Western Railway
- Post-grouping: Great Western Railway

Key dates
- 20 October 1863: Station opened
- 9 September 1963: Station closed
Location

Audlem railway station was a station on the former Great Western Railway between Market Drayton and Nantwich, opened in 1863.

It served the village of Audlem in Cheshire, England until closure in 1963. The station was immortalised in the song "Slow Train" by Flanders and Swann.

== History ==
The station was built by the Nantwich and Market Drayton Railway (N&MDR) and opened on 20 October 1863, although the line was operated by the Great Western Railway from its opening, and the N&MDR eventually amalgamated with the Great Western Railway in 1897. The line passed on to the Western Region of British Railways on nationalisation in 1948, and was then closed to passengers by the British Railways Board on 9 September 1963.

== Route ==
Preceding station	Historical railways	Following station
Coxbank Halt	Nantwich and Market Drayton Railway; Great Western Railway	Coole Pilate Halt
