= Peter Ellson =

English footballer (1925–2014)

Personal information
- Full name: Peter Edward Ellson
- Date of birth: 21 August 1925
- Place of birth: Audlem, Cheshire, England
- Date of death: 14 April 2014 (aged 88)
- Position: Goalkeeper

Senior career*
Years	Team	Apps	(Gls)
- Crewe Railway Police
1949–1956	Crewe Alexandra	219	(0)
- Runcorn
- * Club domestic league appearances and goals

Peter Edward Ellson (21 August 1925 – 14 April 2014) was an English professional footballer who played as a goalkeeper.

== Career ==
After playing for Crewe Railway Police, Ellson joined Crewe Alexandra in May 1949. He made 219 appearances in the Football League for Crewe, and 234 appearances in all competitions. He left Crewe in April 1956, and played non-league football for Runcorn.
