= Audlem =

Village in Cheshire, England

Coordinates: 52.9892°N 2.5079°W

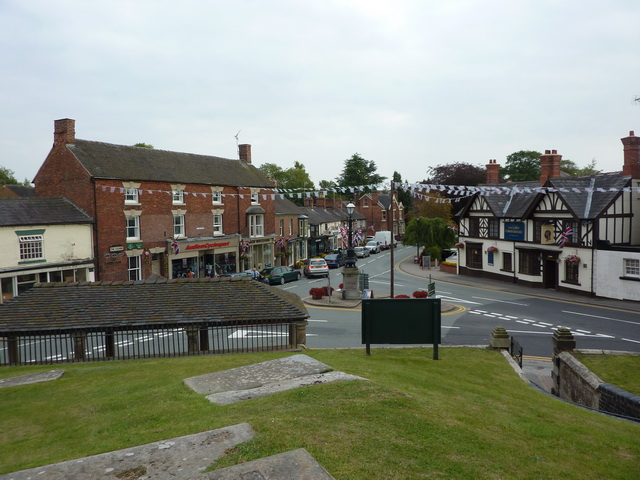
- Main square in Audlem, taken in 2011, from the churchyard.

- Location within Cheshire
- Population: 1,832 (2011 Census)
- OS grid reference: SJ660436
- Civil parish: Audlem
- Unitary authority: Cheshire East
- Ceremonial county: Cheshire
- Region: North West
- Country: England
- Sovereign state: United Kingdom
- Post town: CREWE
- Postcode district: CW3
- Dialling code: 01270
- Police: Cheshire
- Fire: Cheshire
- Ambulance: North West
- UK Parliament: Chester South and Eddisbury

Audlem (/ɔːdləm/ AWD-ləm) is a village and civil parish in the Cheshire East district of Cheshire, England. In 2021, it had a population of 1,832.

Audlem is approximately 7 miles (11 km) south of Nantwich, 8 miles (13 km) east of Whitchurch and 7 miles (11 km) north of Market Drayton. It is also close to the county border with Shropshire.

== History ==
Audlem was mentioned in the Domesday Book in 1086 as Aldelime. By the late 13th century, St James' Church had been founded and Edward I granted it a market charter in 1295.

The arrival of the Shropshire Union Canal in 1835 was a significant development for Audlem. The canal boosted the local economy by facilitating the transport of goods and materials, particularly agricultural produce and coal. During this period, many of the village's distinctive Georgian and Victorian buildings were constructed. Audlem’s flight of 15 locks, designed by Thomas Telford, are a notable engineering feature. Though commercial activity on the canal virtually ceased in the 1950s, it is now an important source of tourism for the village. The canal continues to draw visitors and leisure boaters alike along the waterway itself and to walk the picturesque path.

In 2008 village residents launched an online referendum on transferring the village to Wales from England, in a protest over prescription and parking charges in England. A vote was held which received 88 in favour of the change, and 40 against; no further action was taken.

=== Landmarks ===
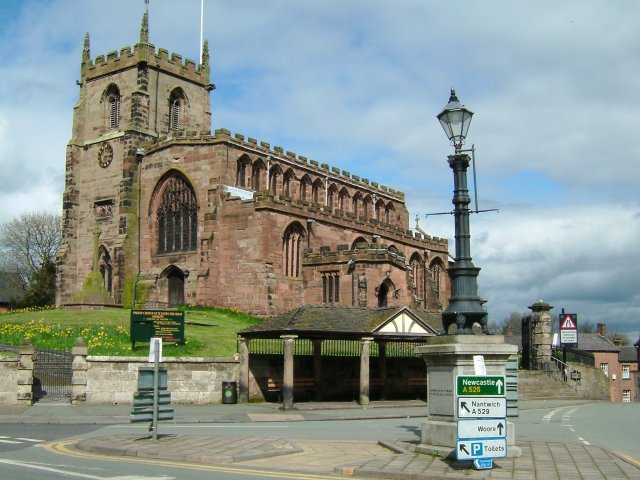
St James' Church

There are many historic buildings including Moss Hall is an Elizabethan timber-framed hall from 1616 one-half mile (0.8 km) from Audlem village centre.

== Education and facilities ==
Audlem has clubs for tennis, badminton, football, cricket, golf, pigeon racing (or pigeon-fancying), caravanning, bell ringing, rambling and bowls. Cyclists meet informally at The Tearoom at No.11. Audlem has a website, AudlemOnline. Saint James' Primary School is the only school in the village.

== Transport ==
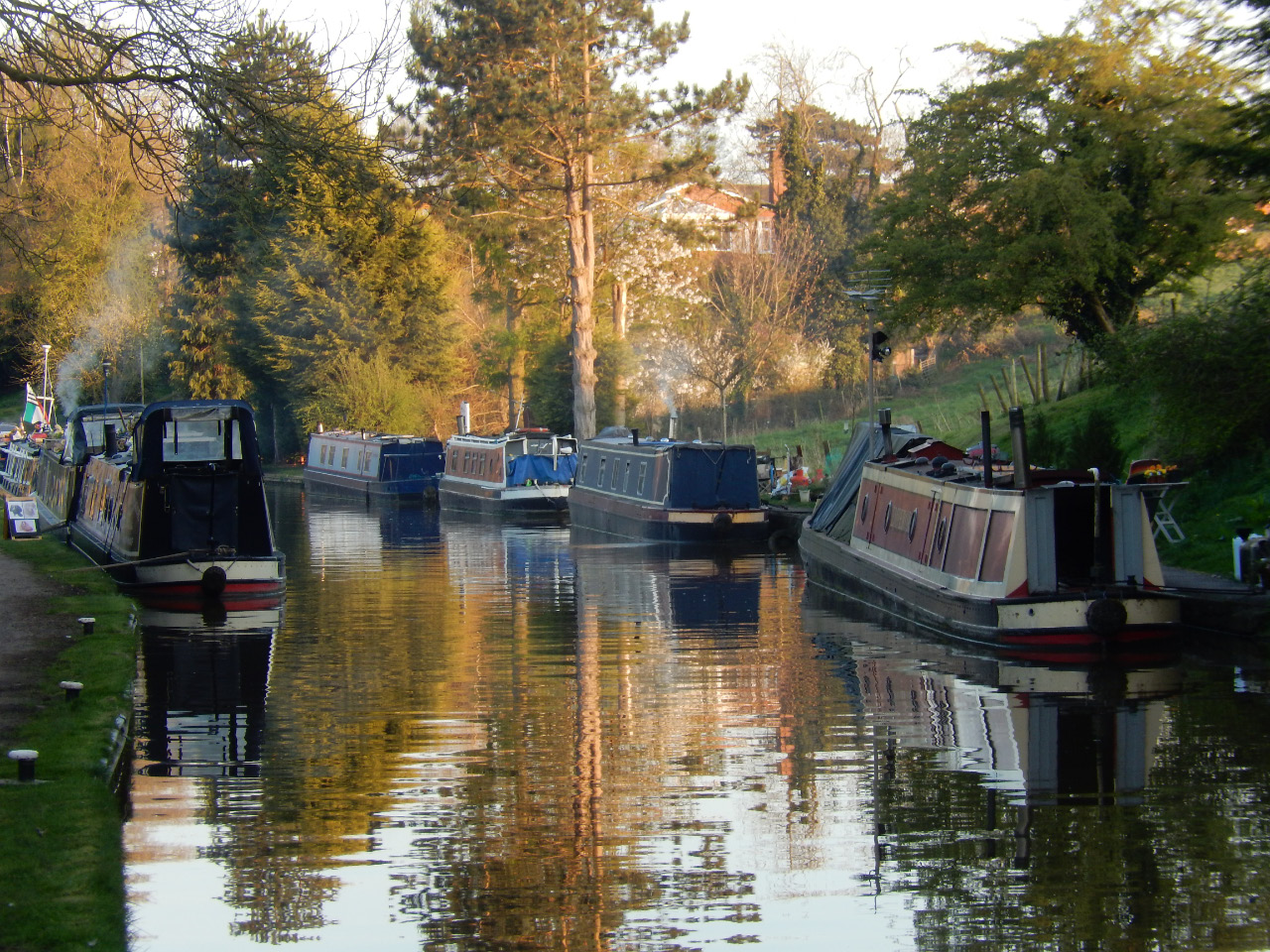
The Shropshire Union Canal in Audlem

=== Roads ===
Audlem lies at the junction of the A525 and A529 roads in south Cheshire. The A525 road runs from Newcastle under Lyme and Woore from the east and Whitchurch from the west. The A529 runs from Nantwich in the north and from Market Drayton in the south.

Audlem is approximately 10 miles (16 km) west of the M6 motorway. The closest junctions are junction 16 from the North and junctions 15 and 14 from the South.

=== Canal ===
Audlem is on the Shropshire Union Canal, which has a flight of 15 locks, to raise the canal 93 feet (28 m) from the Cheshire Plain to the Shropshire Plain. The River Weaver passes west of the village.

=== Railway ===
Audlem railway station was opened on the Wellington to Nantwich Railway. It closed in 1963. Over 100 years after its initial opening in 1863. The station was immortalised in the song "Slow Train" by Flanders and Swann. The site is now occupied by housing.

The closest railway stations are Nantwich and Whitchurch on the Welsh Marches line. Both stations are 7 miles (11 km) from Audlem. Crewe, on the West Coast Main Line, is 10 miles (16 km) away.

=== Buses ===
Audlem is served by the go-too bus. Other bus services were discontinued on 1 September 2024.

== Notable people ==
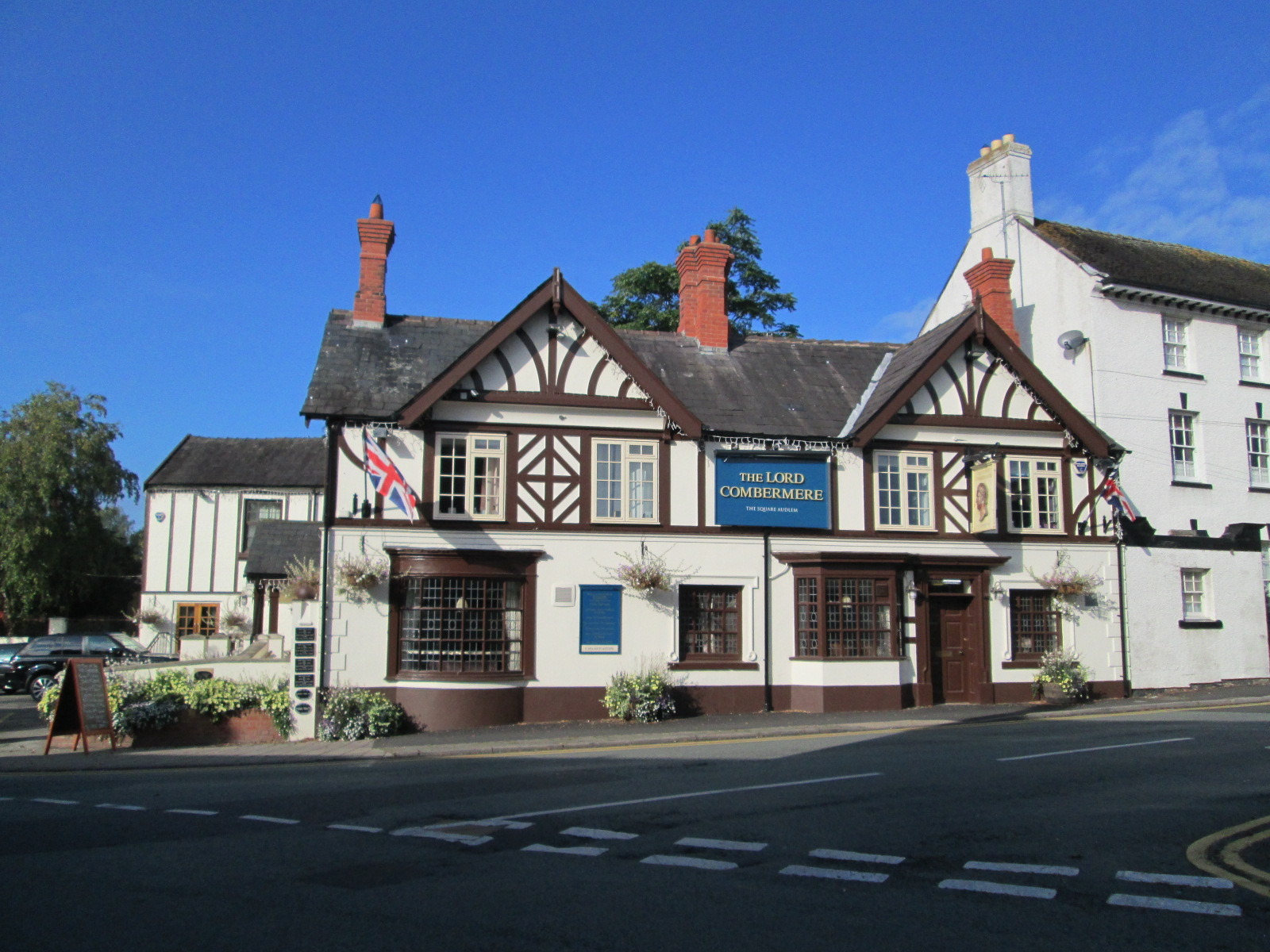
The Lord Combermere pub in Audlem, named Field Marshal Lord Combermere, who was educated in the village

Notable residents and other people associated with Audlem include:

- Isabella Whitney (c.1546/48–after 1624), the first woman known to have published secular poetry in the English language, grew up in Ryle Green when her father took a lease of a farm there. Her brother, Geoffrey Whitney (c.1548–c.1601), is likewise believed to have been brought up there; also a poet, he is known for his collection Choice of Emblemes.
- William Baker (1705–1771), architect, surveyor and building contractor, lived at Highfields from the 1740s.
- Field Marshal Stapleton Cotton, 1st Viscount Combermere (1773–1865), soldier, associate of the Duke of Wellington, was educated at a grammar school then in Audlem for three years from age nine before entering Westminster School.
- Henry Lisle (1846 in Audlem – 1916), lawyer and political figure in Saskatchewan, Canada
- Alice Elizabeth Gillington (1863 in Audlem – 1934), author, poet and journalist; published books about Gypsies
- Mary Clarissa Gillington, later better known as May Byron (1861 in Audlem – 1936), author, poet, elder sister of Alice Gillington
- Herbert Broomfield (1875 in Audlem – 1939), football goalkeeper, 28 pro appearances for Bolton Wanderers F.C.
- Peter Ellson (1925 in Audlem – 2014), professional footballing goalkeeper, 219 pro appearances for Crewe Alexandra F.C.
- Peter McGarr (born 1953), classical composer and teacher; he has written several pieces inspired by Audlem ('Audlem Sonatas', 'Night-time' and 'Mourning Gamelan'), as homage to his mother, who lived in the village when she was a child.
- Margaret Canovan (1939–2018), political theorist, lived in Audlem from 1979 to 2003 while working at Keele University.

== See also ==
- St. James' Church, Audlem
- Audlem Baptist Church

== Notes and references ==
=== Bibliography ===
- Scholes, R. (2000). Towns and villages of Britain: Cheshire. Wilmslow, Cheshire: Sigma Press. ISBN 1-85058-637-3.
