= Wollerton Halt railway station =

Disused railway station in Shropshire, England

Wollerton Halt

General information
- Location: Wollerton, Shropshire; England
- Coordinates: 52.8637°N 2.5624°W
- Grid reference: SJ623299
- Platforms: 2

Other information
- Status: Disused

History
- Post-grouping: Great Western Railway

Key dates
- 2 November 1931: Opened
- 9 September 1963: Closed
Location

Wollerton Halt was a small railway station in the village of Wollerton in Shropshire, England. The station was on the Wellington and Drayton Railway between Market Drayton and Wellington. It was closed at the beginning of September 1963.

Preceding station	Disused railways	Following station
Tern Hill; Line and station closed	Great Western Railway; Wellington and Drayton Railway	Hodnet; Line and station closed
