= May Byron =

British writer and poet (1861–1936)

- Born: Mary Clarissa Gillington; 1861; Audlem, Cheshire, England
- Died: 5 November 1936 (aged 74–75)
- Occupations: Poet; biographer; cookbook author; children's author
- Relatives: Alice E. Gillington (sister)
- Writing career
- Pen name: May Byron, Mary Clarissa Gillington, Maurice Clare
- Years active: 1892–1925

Mary Clarissa "May" Byron (née Gillington; 1861 – 5 November 1936) was a British writer and poet, best known for her abridgements of J. M. Barrie's Peter Pan books. She published under the names May Byron, M.C. Gillington and Maurice Clare. Byron specialised in writing biographies of great composers, poets and writers, before going on to rewrite some of J. M. Barrie's works for younger readers, to write poetry, and to write cookbooks.

== History ==
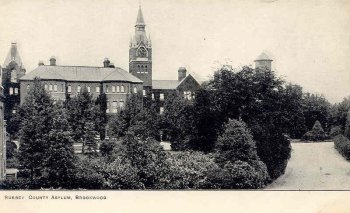
The Brookwood asylum, where Byron's father was chaplain

She was born Mary Clarissa Gillington in 1861 at Audlem, Cheshire, the first of four children of John Maurice Gillington and Sarah Dumville Gillington. She was soon joined by a younger sister, Alice Elizabeth, and two younger brothers, George William and John Louis. Her Dublin-born father was an aspiring clergyman who worked as a clerk. Her mother was born in Huyton, Lancashire. The family moved to Bisley, Surrey when her father found work as a chaplain at the Brookwood Hospital, the local asylum.

In 1892, Mary ("May") and her sister published a book of poems, dedicated to their parents. It included some poems that they had published previously in other books. On 27 August 1892, Gillington married George Frederick Byron, son of Henry James Byron, and went on to have two children with him, James George Byron in 1894 and Charles Byron in 1897.

She went on to write a series of biographies, describing the day-to-day lives of various writers, poets, composers and artists, and published by Hodder & Stoughton. Her series Days with the Great Composers, Days with the Great Authors and Days with the Poets and single titles such as Days with Victorian Poets were published under a number of different pen names: her birth name, M. C. Gillington; her married name, May Byron; and her pseudonym, Maurice Clare.

May Byron is best known for her authorised abridgements of the Peter Pan novels. Her original abridgement in 1915 was titled "Peter Pan and Wendy", the first to use that form. She also re-wrote the J. M. Barrie's Peter Pan novels "for little readers" or "for the nursery".

== Reception ==
May Byron's biographies were generally well-received, though some critics could not tell if they were first-hand or fiction based on research. The books went on to inspire others, and her biography A Day with Shakespeare (written under the pseudonym "Maurice Clare") was particularly influential for James Joyce in writing Ulysses.

Byron's poetry was published in a number of newspapers, with one critic suggesting that her poetry has a "wonderful power". He goes on to say that her poem At Bay is "a cry not from the heart of a woman, but from the heart of Woman". The Ballad of London River For Massed School Singing was popular with schools in the London area and became the "official song" for a number of schools. She wrote several song lyrics for the composer Amy Horrocks.

Her retellings of the Peter Pan books were targeted at parents who wished to read to their young children or allow their children their own copies of books. They were written in simple English, with large type and many colourful illustrations.

In total, May Byron wrote over 100 books, in many different areas. She also had her poems published in newspapers.

== Published books ==
=== Biographies ===
==== Days with the Great Composers ====
- A Day with John Sebastian Bach
- A Day with Ludwig van Beethoven
- A Day with Frédéric Chopin
- A Day with Charles François Gounod
- A day with Edvard Grieg
- A Day with Wolfgang Amadeus Mozart
- A Day with Franz Schubert
- A Day with Robert Schumann
- A Day with Richard Wagner
- A Day with Tschaikovsky
- Days with the Great Composers (1): Beethoven, Mendelssohn, Schubert
- Days with the Great Composers (2): Chopin, Gounod, Wagner

==== Days with the Great Writers ====
- A Day with Charlotte Brontë
- A Day with Thomas Carlyle
- A Day with Charles Dickens
- A Day with Ralph Waldo Emerson
- A Day with Nathaniel Hawthorne
- A Day with Charles Kingsley
- A Day with Shakespeare
- A Day with Robert Louis Stevenson
- A Day with William Makepeace Thackeray

==== Days with the Poets ====
- A Day with Elizabeth Barrett Browning
- A Day with Robert Browning
- A Day with Robert Burns
- A Day with Lord Byron
- A Day with Samuel Taylor Coleridge
- A Day with George Eliot
- A Day with Keats
- A Day with Omar Khayyam
- A Day with Henry Wadsworth Longfellow
- A Day with John Milton
- A Day with William Morris
- A Day with Dante Gabriel Rossetti
- A Day with Sir Walter Scott
- A Day with Shakespeare
- A Day with Percy Bysshe Shelley
- A Day with Alfred Lord Tennyson
- A Day with Walt Whitman
- A Day with John Greenleaf Whittier
- A Day with William Wordsworth
- Days with the Victorian Poets : Rossetti, Morris, Mrs. Browning.

==== Golden Hours With the Saints ====
- Saint Augustine
- St. Francis of Assisi
- Brother Lawrence
- Saint Theresa of Avila
- Thomas à Kempis

=== Poetry ===
- The Garden of Love
- The Golden Garden of the Poets
- Poems (with A. E. Gillington)
- The Wind on the Heath
- Christmas Bells

=== Cook books ===
- May Byron's Pudding Book
- May Byron's Rations Book
- May Byron's Vegetable Book
- May Byron's Jam Book
- May Byron's Cake Book
- May Byron's How-To-Save Cookery Book
- Jams and Jellies
- Pot-Luck
- Simple Fare for Sick Folk
- Puddings, Pastries, and Sweet Dishes

=== Children's books ===
- The Little Wee Bear and Goldenhair
- The Little Brown Rooster
- The Little Yellow Duckling
- The Little Tan Terrier
- The Little Small Red Hen
- Cat's Cradle: A Picture-book for Little Folk; Cats by Louis Wain; Rhymes by May Byron
- Jack-a-Dandy
- J.M. Barrie's Peter Pan and Wendy: Retold for Little People (authorised abridgement)
- J.M. Barrie's Peter Pan in Kensington Gardens: Retold for Little People (authorised abridgement)
