= Herbert Broomfield =

English footballer

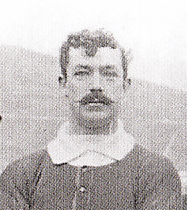

Personal information
- Date of birth: 1875
- Place of birth: Audlem, Cheshire, England
- Date of death: 1939 (aged 64)
- Place of death: Cheshire, England
- Position: Goalkeeper

Senior career*
| Years | Team | Apps | (Gls) |
- Northwich Wednesday
| ?–1902 | Northwich Victoria | | |
| 1902–1907 | Bolton Wanderers | 28 | (0) |
| 1907–1908 | Manchester United | 9 | (0) |
| 1908–1910 | Manchester City | 4 | (0) |
| 1910–? | Manchester United | 0 | (0) |
| Total | | 41 | (0) |
- * Club domestic league appearances and goals

Herbert Broomfield (bapt. 14 February 1875 – 1939) was an English footballer who played as a goalkeeper. Born in Audlem, Cheshire, he played for Northwich Wednesday, Northwich Victoria, Bolton Wanderers, Manchester City and Manchester United.

Broomfield was secretary of the football Players' Union in 1909, during the threatened strike.
