= Alice E. Gillington =

British writer and poet, journalist and anthropologist

- Born: 1863; Audlem, Cheshire, England
- Died: 22 May 1934 (aged 70–71); Poole, Dorset, England
- Occupations: Poet, journalist
- Relatives: May Byron, John Maurice Gillington (father), Sarah Dumville Gillington (mother)
- Writing career
- Pen name: Betty Gillington; The Romany Rawny
- Years active: 1892–1925

Alice Elizabeth Gillington (1863 – 22 May 1934) was a British author, poet and journalist. She published works under the names Alice E. Gillington, Betty Gillington and The Romany Rawny. Gillington published early works of poetry with her sister, May Byron, before moving into a caravan and living with local Gypsy folk. She joined the Gypsy Lore Society and went on to publish books about Gypsies, collections of their folklore, folk songs and singing games. Although she corresponded with the Folk-Song Society, she never joined.

== Early life ==
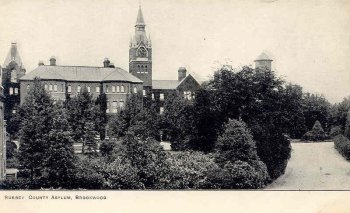
Gillington's father was chaplain at the Brookwood asylum

Alice Gillington was born in 1863 at Audlem, Cheshire, to John Maurice Gillington and Sarah Dumville Gillington. She was the second of four children with an older sister, Mary Clarissa Gillington, and two younger brothers, George William Gillington and John Louis Gillington. Her Dublin-born father was an aspiring clergyman, then working as a clerk, whilst her mother was born in Huyton, Lancashire. The family moved to Bisley, Surrey, when her father found a role as a chaplain at the Brookwood Hospital, the local asylum.

In 1892, Alice and her sister published a book of poems, dedicated to their parents. It included some poems that they had published previously in other books. Alice went on to write other poems such as The Doom-Bar, about the Doom Bar sand bank in Cornwall, which were included in A Victorian Anthology, 1837–1895.

== Gypsy work ==
Gillington produced a collection of Gypsy folktales in 1903, and went on to join the Gypsy Lore Society a few years later. It was there that she caught the eye of Augustus John and John Sampson. She gradually moved into a caravan and by 1911 had fully migrated into "The Brown Caravan", together with her brother John who was in "The Yellow Caravan", and remained living as a nomad for the remainder of her days. Often she would set up camp with different Gypsy groups, sometimes away from them, but her brother was always nearby.

Whilst living with the Gypsies, Gillington published a number of collections of their folk songs and singing games. She attempted to contribute to the Folk-Song Society's journal by sending songs to Lucy Broadwood, though she was unsuccessful. Later, though, Robert Andrew Scott Macfie contacted her to ensure she kept collecting folk songs.

It is pleasant to know that you will not tamper with them as some people have done, and that however corrupt the Romani may be & however uncouth the rhythm we shall have the exact words the Gypsies sing.

— Letter from Robert Andrew Scott Macfie to Alice E. Gillington

Gillington was secretive about her time with the Gypsies, trying to keep her life with them separate from her old life. She complained in letters about afternoon visitors and specifically stated in one "I never want my Komalesti's to know I write about them." Gillington eventually died of a stroke on 22 May 1934 in Poole, Dorset.

== Selected works ==
=== Books ===
- Poems, as A. E. Gillington, with M. C. Gillington (1892)
- Two poems in A Victorian Anthology, 1837–1895, Edmund Clarence Stedman (1895)
- Gypsies of the Heath as The Romany Rawny (1916)

=== Collections ===
Assembled by Alice E. Gillington:

- Eight Hampshire Folk Songs (1907)
- Old Hampshire Singing Games (1909)
- Old Isle of Wight Singing Games (1909)
- Old Surrey Singing Games and Skipping-Rope Rhymes (1909)
- Old Christmas Carols of the Southern Counties (1910)
- Breton Singing Games (1910)
- Songs of the Open Road (1911)
- Old Dorset Singing Games (1913)

=== Journal articles ===
- "The River Running By", Journal of the Gypsy Lore Society, n.s. 1 (1907–08), 60–65.
- "A Gypsy's Grave", Journal of the Gypsy Lore Society, n.s. 1 (1907–08), 397–98.
- "The House of the Open Door", Journal of the Gypsy Lore Society, n.s. 2 (1908–09), 150–56.
- "The Stanleys' Forfeited Estates", Journal of the Gypsy Lore Society, n.s. 2 (1908–09), 287–88.
- "The Bushes Green: New Forest Tent-dwellers' Night Prayer", Journal of the Gypsy Lore Society, n.s. 5 (1911–12), 53–54.
- "Wild Daffodils in the Wood", Country Life, 22 June 1912, pp. 927–28.
- "New Forest Words", Journal of the Gypsy Lore Society, n.s. 6 (1912–13), 147.
- "The Last Journey", Journal of the Gypsy Lore Society, n.s. 8 (1914–15), 153–54.
- "Our Gypsy Recruits", Country Life, 27 February 1915, pp. 268–69.
- "Burroder Lavs from the Nevi Vesh", Journal of the Gypsy Lore Society, n.s. 9 (1915–16), 224.
- "Trades of the Travellers of the New Forest", Journal of the Gypsy Lore Society, 3rd series, 4 (1925), 95.
