= Tern Hill railway station =

Disused railway station in Shropshire, England

Tern Hill

General information
- Location: Ternhill, Shropshire; England
- Coordinates: 52.8856°N 2.5452°W
- Grid reference: SJ635323
- Platforms: 2

Other information
- Status: Disused

History
- Original company: Wellington and Drayton Railway
- Pre-grouping: Great Western Railway
- Post-grouping: Great Western Railway

Key dates
- 1867: Opened
- 1963: Closed for passengers
- 10 August 1964: closed for goods
Location

Tern Hill railway station was a station in Ternhill, Shropshire, England. The station was opened in 1867 and closed in 1963. The station had a pagoda shelter, adjacent to the booking office.

Preceding station	Disused railways	Following station
Little Drayton Halt; Line and station closed	Great Western Railway; Wellington and Drayton Railway	Wollerton Halt; Line and station closed
