= Wollerton =

Coordinates: 52.864°N 2.561°W

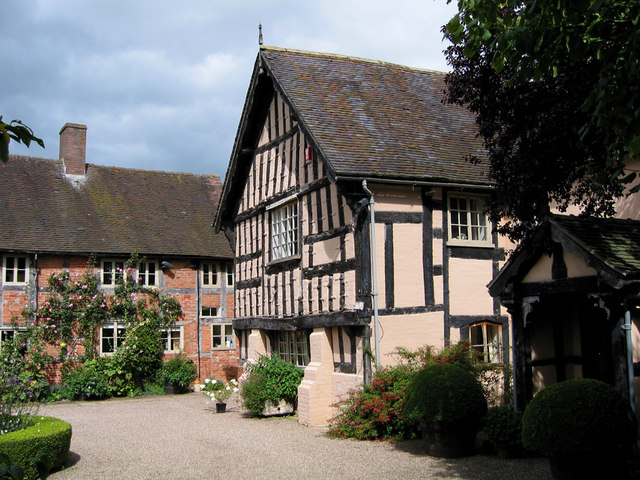
- Wollerton Old Hall, the manor house of the settlement

- Location within Shropshire
- OS grid reference: SJ621298
- Civil parish: Hodnet
- Unitary authority: Shropshire
- Ceremonial county: Shropshire
- Region: West Midlands
- Country: England
- Sovereign state: United Kingdom
- Post town: Market Drayton
- Postcode district: TF9
- Dialling code: 01630
- Police: West Mercia
- Fire: Shropshire
- Ambulance: West Midlands
- UK Parliament: North Shropshire

Wollerton is a small village within the civil parish of Hodnet in Shropshire, England. It lies approximately three miles to the south west of Market Drayton and sits on the old A53 and adjacent to the new Hodnet bypass which forms the new route of the A53.

== History ==
Wollerton in 1086 was known as 'Ulvreton. This was routed from the Saxon name 'Wulfrun's – tun': Wulfrun's farm or house. In 1066, the manor was held by Askell, but by 1086 it had passed to Roger de Montgomery at which time it was part of Hodnet Hundred.

The Old Hall is a Grade II* listed building and a garden venue.

In the 16th century the manor was held by the John Gratewood, who married a sister Sir Rowland Hill of Soulton (publisher of the Geneva Bible and inspiration for Shakespeare's As You Like It. The daughter of this union, Alice, married Reginald Corbet, and a monument to that couple exists in the church at Stoke on Tern.

== Human and physical geography ==
Since the construction of the Hodnet bypass, Wollerton's public house, The Squirrel, has closed and no other amenities other than a URC chapel remain.

The village used to have a railway station, Wollerton Halt on the Wellington and Drayton Railway until the line was dismantled in 1970.

== See also ==
- Listed buildings in Hodnet, Shropshire
