= Newcastle Crossing railway station =

Short-lived railway station in Stapeley, Cheshire

Newcastle Crossing

General information
- Location: Stapeley, Cheshire East; England
- Coordinates: 53.0634°N 2.5032°W
- Grid reference: SJ663519

Other information
- Status: Disused

History
- Original company: London and North Western Railway
- Pre-grouping: London and North Western Railway

Key dates
- 2 January 1911: Opened
- 1 April 1918: Closed
Location

Newcastle Crossing railway station co-served the hamlet of Stapeley, Cheshire East, England, from 1911 to 1918 on the Crewe and Shrewsbury Railway.

== History ==
The station was opened on 2 January 1911 by the London and North Western Railway. It closed on 1 April 1918. The Railway Clearing House handbook showed it as a halt in their 1921 list of closures.

Preceding station	Historical railways	Following station
Willaston; Line open, station closed	London and North Western Railway; Crewe and Shrewsbury Railway	Nantwich; Line and station open
