= Adderley railway station =

Disused railway station in Shropshire, England

Adderley

General information
- Location: Adderley, Shropshire; England
- Coordinates: 52.9575°N 2.5038°W
- Grid reference: SJ661401
- Platforms: 2

Other information
- Status: Disused

History
- Original company: Nantwich and Market Drayton Railway
- Pre-grouping: Great Western Railway
- Post-grouping: Great Western Railway

Key dates
- 20 October 1863: Station opens
- 9 September 1963: Station closes
Location

Adderley railway station was a station serving the village of Adderley in the English county of Shropshire.

== History ==
The station was built by the Nantwich and Market Drayton Railway (N&MDR) and opened on 20 October 1863, although the line was operated by the Great Western Railway from its opening and the Nantwich and Market Drayton Railway was eventually amalgamated into the Great Western Railway in 1897. The line passed on to the Western Region of British Railways on nationalisation in 1948, and was then closed to passengers by the British Railways Board on 9 September 1963.

== Route ==
Preceding station	Historical railways	Following station
Market Drayton	Nantwich and Market Drayton Railway; Great Western Railway	Coxbank Halt
