= Nantwich railway station =

Railway station in Cheshire, England

Coordinates: 53.063°N 2.519°W

Nantwich
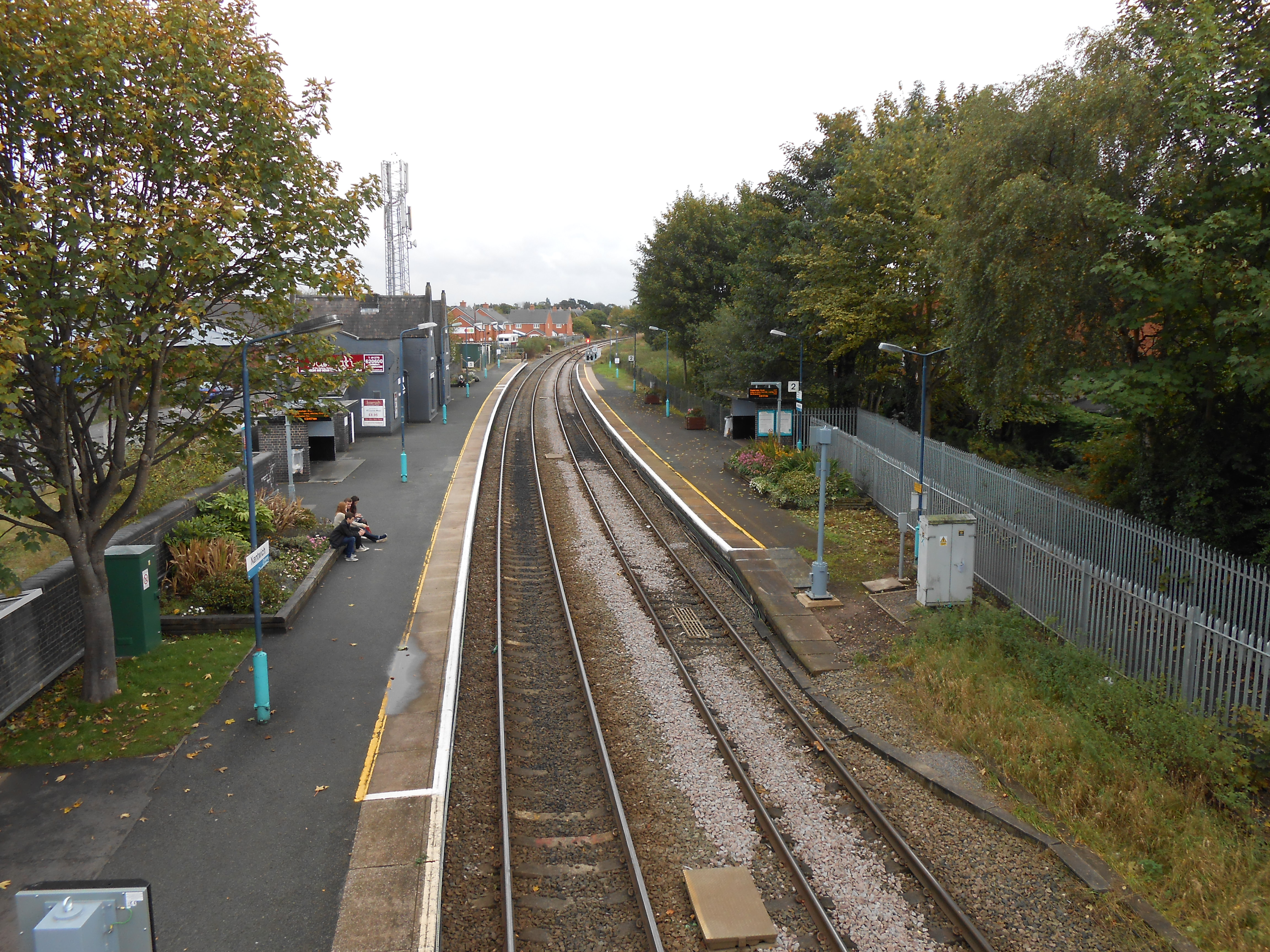
- Nantwich railway station in 2013

General information
- Location: Nantwich, Cheshire East; England
- Grid reference: SJ653519
- Managed by: Transport for Wales
- Platforms: 2

Other information
- Station code: NAN
- Classification: DfT category F1

Passengers
- 2020/21: ▼42,038
- 2021/22: ▲0.144 million
- 2022/23: ▲0.186 million
- 2023/24: ▲0.195 million
- 2024/25: ▲0.223 million
Location
Notes
- Passenger statistics from the Office of Rail and Road

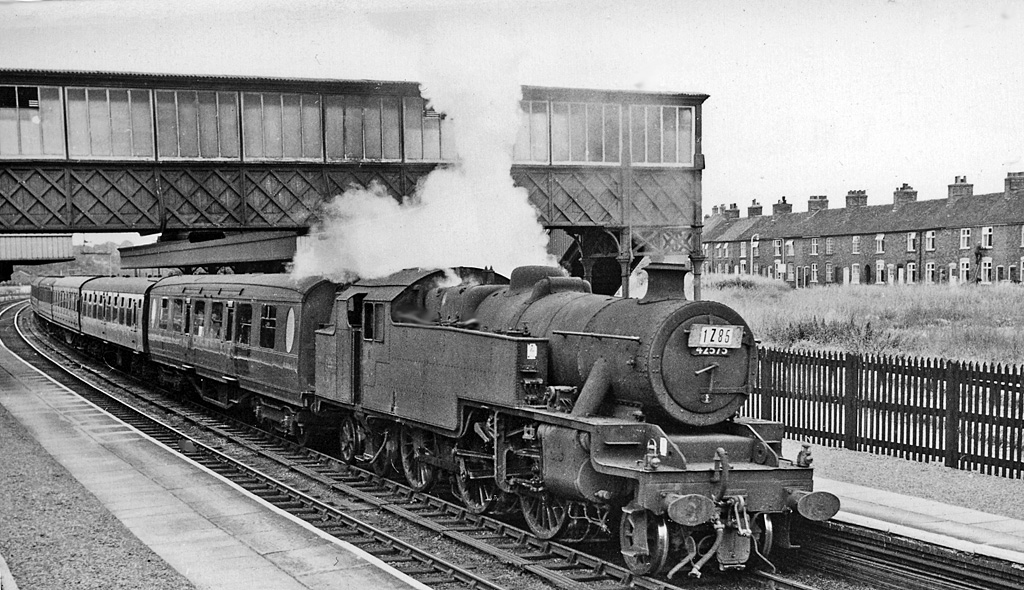
Bank Holiday Special in 1962

Nantwich railway station serves the town of Nantwich, Cheshire, England. It is on the Crewe to Shrewsbury line 4 1/2 miles (7.2 km) south west of Crewe. Opened in 1858, it was the junction for the Great Western Railway route to Wellington via Market Drayton until 1963.

== History ==
The town was initially considered as potential calling point for the Grand Junction Railway route between London, Birmingham and Manchester/Liverpool, but opposition from coaching and canal interests therein led to the Grand Junction being routed through Crewe instead. The Crewe and Shrewsbury Railway would end up being the first route into the town – authorised by Parliament in 1852, it was eventually opened in September 1858 and was operated by the London and North Western Railway. This subsequently became part of a busy through route between the north west of England and South Wales (the modern day Welsh Marches Line). The Nantwich and Market Drayton Railway linking the titular towns opened five years later, making the station a junction in the process – known locally as the "Gingerbread Line" (Market Drayton being renowned for the production of said confectionery), it was later extended to Wellington and officially became part of the Great Western Railway system in 1897. This line was a busy freight artery but in pre-grouping days was also used by the GWR to run expresses all the way to Manchester London Road (albeit using running rights over the LNWR north of Nantwich).

Passenger services over the Market Drayton line were withdrawn by the British Railways Board on 9 September 1963. Freight continued to run for the next four years (the line was utilised as a diversionary route during the electrification of the West Coast Main Line), but it eventually closed completely in 1967 and was lifted by 1970.

There are three level crossings at or near to the station and until the late 1960s each had its own signal box; a fourth was also provided to the south to control the junction with the Market Drayton branch. All but the station box were removed in the 1970s when the crossings were automated, with the latter also succumbing when the line was re-signalled in late 2013 (the crossings are now remotely monitored from the South Wales rail operating centre in Cardiff). After two years of disuse, the structure was dismantled by Network Rail in January 2016 for reuse at its training academy at Crewe.

== Facilities ==
The station is now unstaffed but has a self-service ticket machine available, which can be used for pre-paid ticket collection and buying before travel. The main building on the northbound platform still stands, but has been converted for use as an Indian restaurant; shelters are located on each side for passenger use. Train running information is provided by CIS screens, customer help points and timetable poster boards. The footbridge linking the platforms has steps, but level access is possible via the crossing and ramps to each platform.

== Services ==
The station is served by two-hourly services between Crewe and Shrewsbury. There are some longer distance services between Manchester Piccadilly and Cardiff Central (with some extensions further west to Swansea and Carmarthen and two trains to Swansea via the Heart of Wales Line) on Mondays to Fridays.

There is an infrequent service (five trains northbound, six southbound) which runs on Sundays.

Preceding station	National Rail	Following station
Wrenbury	Transport for Wales; Welsh Marches Line	Crewe
	Disused railways	
Terminus	Great Western Railway; Nantwich and Market Drayton Railway	Coole Pilate Halt; Line and station closed
Wrenbury; Line and station open	London, Midland and Scottish Railway; Crewe and Shrewsbury Railway	Willaston; Line open, station closed
Wrenbury; Line open, station closed	London and North Western Railway; Crewe and Shrewsbury Railway	Newcastle Crossing; Line open, station closed
