= Hodnet railway station =

Disused railway station in Shropshire, England

Hodnet

General information
- Location: Hodnet, Shropshire; England
- Coordinates: 52.8486°N 2.5628°W
- Grid reference: SJ621280
- Platforms: 2

Other information
- Status: Disused

History
- Original company: Wellington and Drayton Railway
- Pre-grouping: Great Western Railway
- Post-grouping: Great Western Railway

Key dates
- 16 October 1867: Opened
- 9 September 1963: Closed
Location

Hodnet railway station was a station in Hodnet, Shropshire, England. The station was opened in 1867 and closed in 1963.

Preceding station	Disused railways	Following station
Wollerton Halt; Line and station closed	Great Western Railway; Wellington and Drayton Railway	Peplow; Line and station closed
