= Peplow railway station =

Disused railway station in Shropshire, England

Peplow
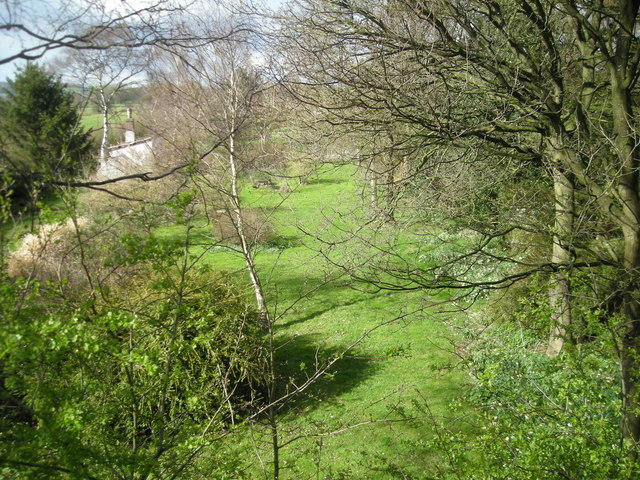
- The site of the station in 2008

General information
- Location: Peplow, Shropshire; England
- Coordinates: 52.8178°N 2.5590°W
- Grid reference: SJ624246
- Platforms: 2

Other information
- Status: Disused

History
- Original company: Wellington and Drayton Railway
- Pre-grouping: Great Western Railway
- Post-grouping: Great Western Railway

Key dates
- 16 October 1867: Opened
- 9 September 1963: Closed
Location

Peplow railway station was a station in Peplow, Shropshire, England. The station was opened in 1867 and closed in 1963. The track has been infilled to form the garden for the station house which is now a private residence along with a waiting shelter on the northbound platform.

| Preceding station | Disused railways | Following station |
|---|---|---|
| Hodnet; Line and station closed | Great Western Railway; Wellington and Drayton Railway | Ellerdine Halt; Line and station closed |
