= Wellington and Drayton Railway =

Standard gauge line in England

The Wellington and Drayton Railway was a standard gauge line in Central England which carried through freight and local passenger traffic until closure in the 1960s. It was part of the Great Western Railway's double track Wellington-Crewe line, linking the Midlands to the north and northwest.

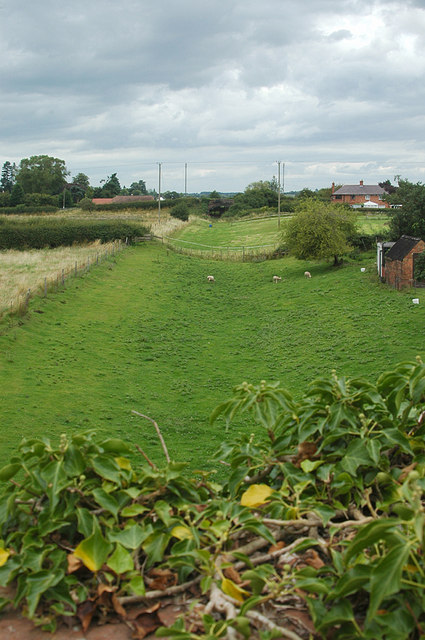
View looking towards Market Drayton from Woolerton

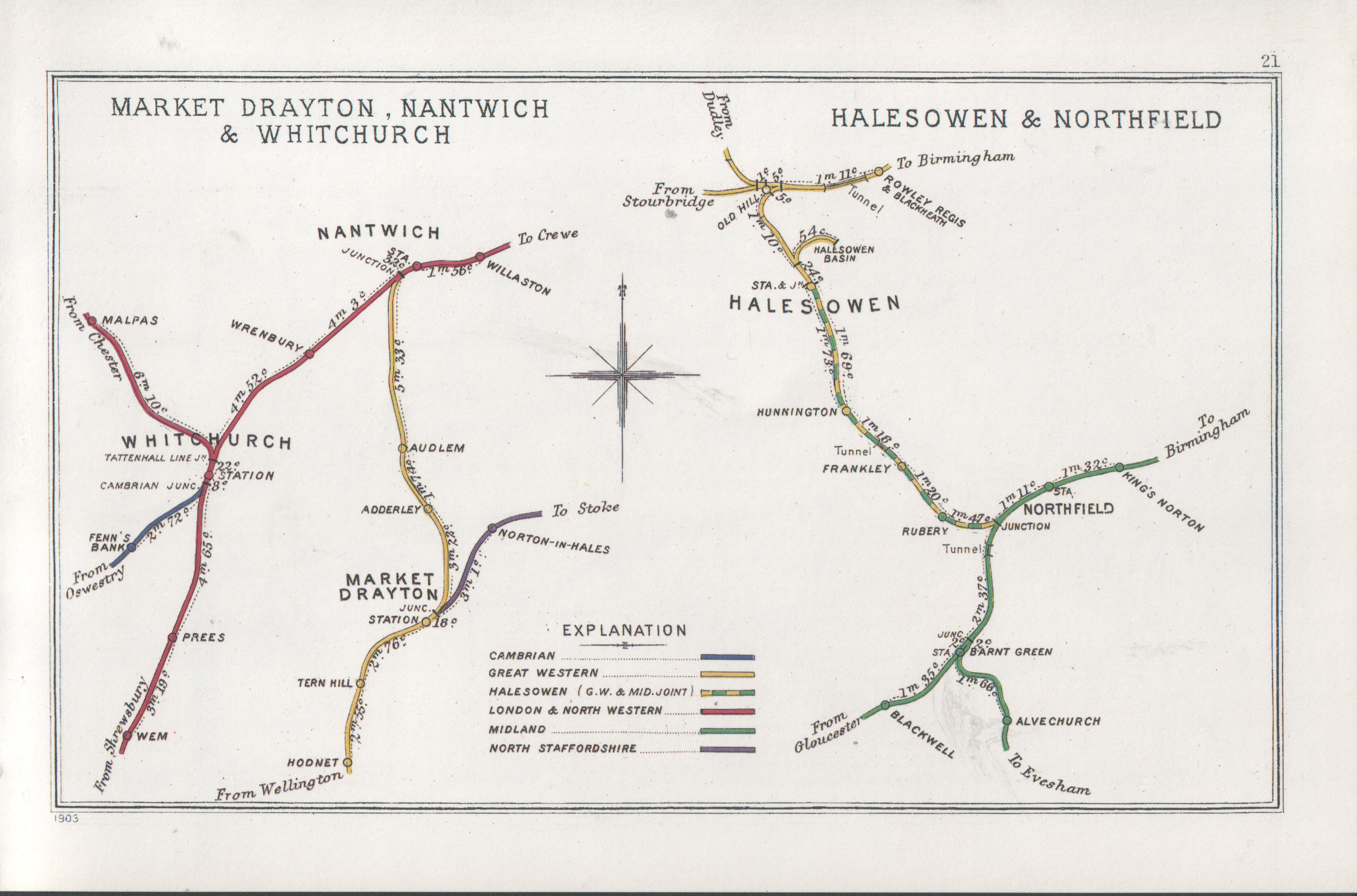
Railway Diagram

== History ==
The Wellington and Drayton Railway was incorporated on 7 August 1862, and in November of that year deposited plans for a line connecting Wellington to Market Drayton, together with extensions northwards towards Manchester, to join the LNWR near Minshull Vernon, the Cheshire Midland Railway near Knutsford, the Manchester South Junction and Altrincham Railway and the Manchester and Bolton Railway at Salford, to provide the Great Western Railway with access to Manchester. Additionally there were plans for a branch from Market Drayton to Newcastle-under-Lyme, but these were abandoned due to opposition from the LNWR and North Staffordshire Railway.

Circumstances changed rapidly, and alliance with the Nantwich and Market Drayton Railway together with running powers from Nantwich to Crewe and onwards to Manchester through amalgamation of the Great Western Railway with the West Midland Railway meant that the northern extensions were no longer needed by the GWR for access to Manchester.

The line ran from Drayton Junction (52.7031°N 2.5317°W), on the Shrewsbury and Wellington Joint Railway just west of Wellington station, to an end-on junction with the Nantwich and Market Drayton Railway at Market Drayton (52.9093°N 2.4895°W), a distance of some 16 miles. Construction started in 1864, and the line was opened in 1867. The consulting engineer was John Fowler.

Wellington and Drayton Railway Act 1864
- Act of Parliament
- Parliament of the United Kingdom
- Long title: An Act to enable the Wellington and Drayton Railway Company to divert a Portion of their authorized Railway, and to transfer their Undertaking to the Great Western Railway Company.
- Citation: 27 & 28 Vict. c. clxxvi

Dates
- Royal assent: 14 July 1864

Status: Current legislation

Text of statute as originally enacted

After the first meeting at Malvern, Worcestershire, all subsequent directors' meetings were held at Paddington station, with directors supplied by the GWR, and the Wellington and Drayton Railway Act 1864 (27 & 28 Vict. c. clxxvi) of 14 July 1864 authorised the transfer of the Wellington and Drayton Railway to the Great Western Railway (GWR) on completion of the line. However, this transfer was not formally sealed until 30 August 1877.

The passenger service was withdrawn in 1963. Freight service continued until 1967, the line providing a relief route during the electrification of the London-Crewe line. The lifting of the track was completed during 1970.

== Traffic ==
Passenger traffic was modest, typically about six local stopping trains a day in each direction. Most ran between Crewe and Wellington, some continued to/from Manchester to the north and Worcester or Wolverhampton (for Paddington) to the south, or included through coaches for the extended routes. Following the establishment of several RAF airfields in the area during World War II, the railway gained a new purpose, transporting personnel from the Wellington mainline station to the rural camps. During the line's latter years excursion trains were seen, and during its final year the "Pines Express" between Manchester and Bournemouth used the line.

Freight traffic was much more significant. Typically there were about twenty trains a day in each direction, of which two would be local goods, and the remainder would be through traffic, either non-stop over the line or stopping only at Market Drayton. Principally these carried manufactured goods from the midlands to the northwest, also fruit from the Worcester area. There was little coal and mineral traffic.

== Present day ==
Only the station building at Peplow remains, as a private residence.

In 2017, the Shropshire Star reported that the 2017 Conservative parliamentary candidate for Newcastle-under-Lyme, Owen Meredith, suggested a feasibility study into reopening part of the line, to connect Newcastle with Stoke and HS2.

In January 2019, the Campaign for Better Transport identified the line between Stoke and Wellington as Priority 2 for reopening. Priority 2 is for those lines which require further development or a change in circumstances (such as housing developments).

== Stations ==
Wellington and Drayton Railway Stations
Station Name	Co-ordinates
Market Drayton	52.909135°N 2.489133°W
Little Drayton Halt	52.902677°N 2.506192°W
Tern Hill	52.885305°N 2.545878°W
Wollerton Halt	52.863952°N 2.563017°W
Hodnet	52.849074°N 2.563623°W
Peplow	52.817894°N 2.559257°W
Ellerdine Halt	52.786523°N 2.554992°W
Rowton Halt	52.774868°N 2.554890°W
Crudgington	52.758068°N 2.552251°W
Longdon Halt	52.731192°N 2.549343°W
Wellington	52.701397°N 2.516803°W
