= Crewe railway station =

Principal railway station in Cheshire, England

Crewe
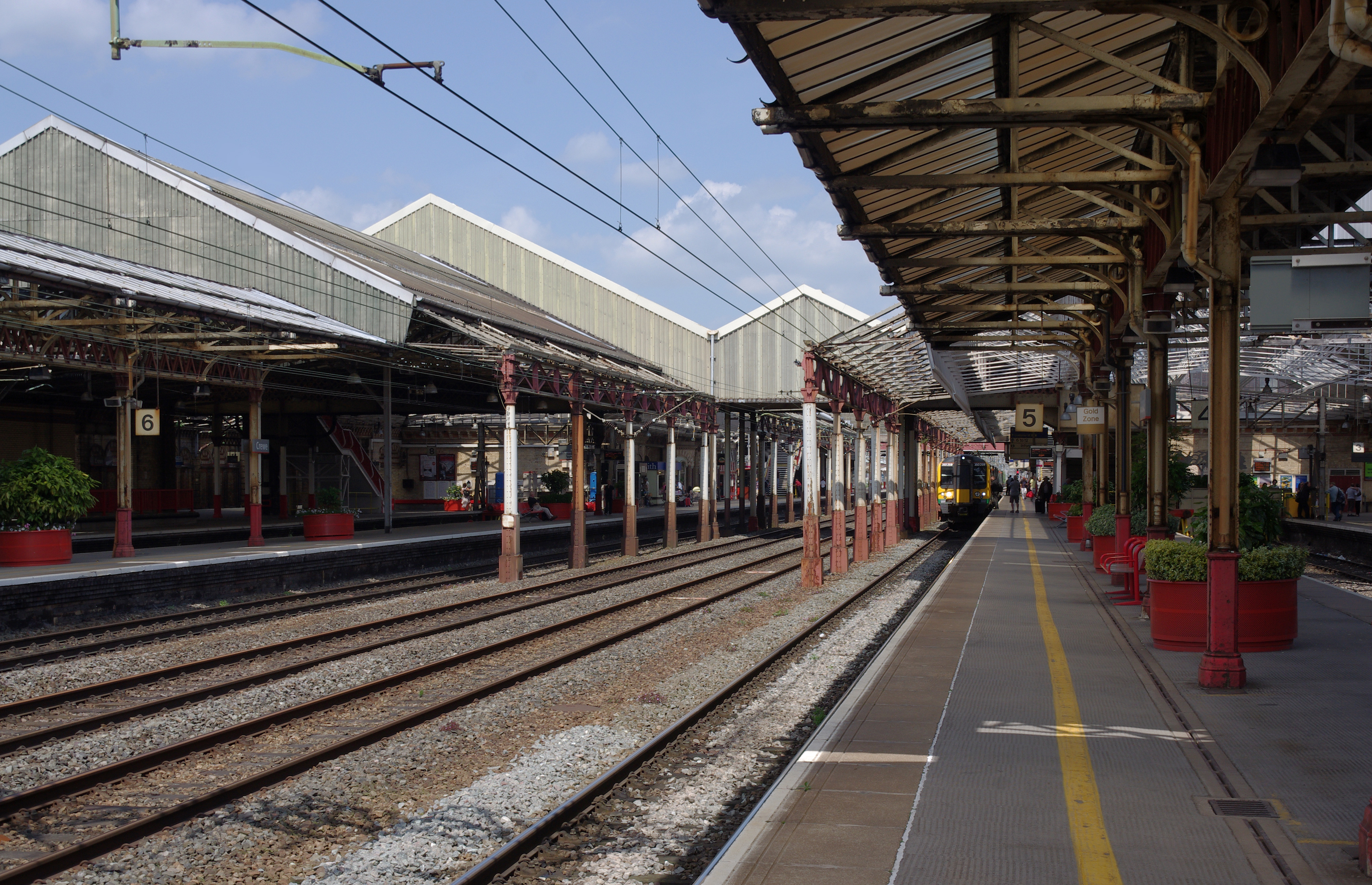
- A view of platforms 5 and 6, with two fast lines in the middle

General information
- Location: Crewe, Cheshire East, England
- Coordinates: 53.089°N 2.433°W
- Grid reference: SJ710547
- Manager: Avanti West Coast
- Platforms: 12
- Tracks: 14

Other information
- Station code: CRE
- Classification: DfT category B

Key dates
- 4 July 1837: Opened
- 1867: Rebuilt
- 1903-1907: Platforms lengthened
- 1984-1985: Remodelled

Passengers
- 2021/22: ▲2.717 million
- Interchange: ▲0.802 million
- 2022/23: ▲2.923 million
- Interchange: ▲1.073 million
- 2023/24: ▲3.143 million
- Interchange: ▲1.326 million
- 2024/25: ▲3.390 million
- Interchange: ▲1.428 million
- 2025/26: ▲3.680 million
- Interchange: ▼1.341 million

Listed Building – Grade II
- Feature: 1867 buildings at Crewe Railway Station
- Designated: 30 August 2016
- Reference no.: 1436435
Location
Notes
- Passenger statistics from the Office of Rail and Road

Crewe railway station serves the railway town of Crewe, in Cheshire, England. It opened in 1837 and is one of the most historically significant railway stations in the world.

It is a major junction on the West Coast Main Line and serves as a rail gateway for North West England. It is 158 miles (254 km) north of London Euston and 243 miles (391 km) south of Glasgow Central. It is located at the point where the lines to Manchester Piccadilly and North Wales diverge from this route; it is the last major station before the branch to Liverpool Lime Street diverges. It is also served by lines to Stoke-on-Trent and Shrewsbury.

Crewe station has twelve platforms and a modern passenger entrance containing a bookshop and ticket office. Passengers access the platforms via a footbridge, stairs and lifts. The platform buildings, which date from the 19th century, contain two bookshops, bars, buffets and waiting rooms. The last major expenditure on the station took place in 1984-1985 when the track layout was remodelled and the station facilities were updated.

== History ==
=== Early years ===
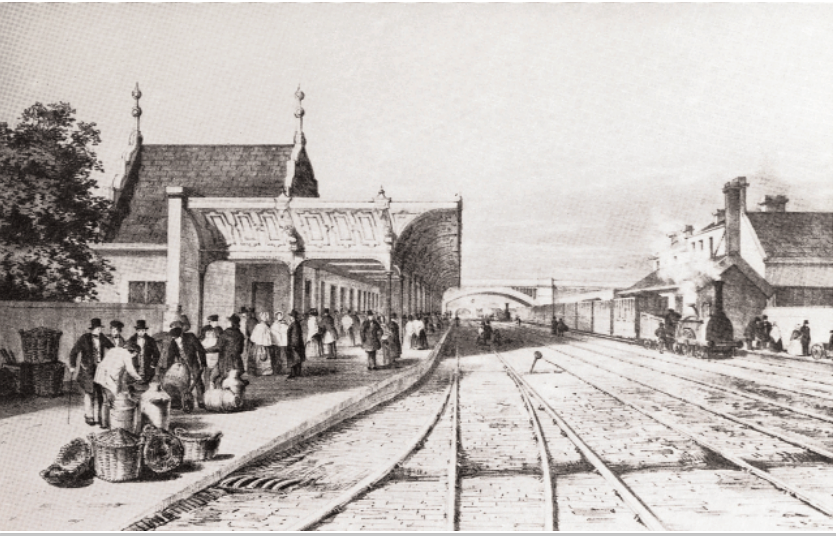
Early image of the original Crewe station c. 1840.

Crewe's location was chosen after Winsford, seven miles (11.3 km) to the north, had rejected an earlier proposal, as had local landowners in neighbouring Nantwich, four miles (6.4 km) away.

Crewe was the first station to have its own adjacent railway hotel, the Crewe Arms Hotel, built in 1838, and still in use. It was the first to be completely rebuilt owing to the need for expansion. It was also the first to have completely independent rail lines built around it to ease traffic congestion.

The station opened on 4 July 1837 on the Grand Junction Railway. The purpose was to link the four largest cities of England by joining the existing Liverpool and Manchester Railway with the projected London & Birmingham Railway. The first long-distance railway in the world, it ran from Curzon Street railway station in Birmingham to Dallam in Warrington, Cheshire, where it made an end-on junction with the Warrington and Newton Railway, a branch of the L&M.

The station was built in the township of Crewe, which formed part of the ancient parish of Barthomley. The township later became a civil parish in its own right and, later still, was renamed Crewe Green to avoid confusion with the town of Crewe, which was adjacent to it. The station was at the point where the line crossed the turnpike road linking the Trent and Mersey, and the Shropshire Union Canals. Since the land was bought from the Earl of Crewe, whose mansion stood nearby and it was located in the township of Crewe, the station was called Crewe. The railway station gave its name to the town of Crewe that was actually situated in the ancient parish of Coppenhall. In 1936, the railway station was transferred from the civil parish of Crewe to the then municipal borough of the same name.

As soon as the station opened, the Chester and Crewe Railway was formed to build a branch line to Chester; this company was absorbed by the GJR shortly before it opened to traffic in 1840. A locomotive depot was built to serve the Chester line and to provide banking engines to assist trains southwards from Crewe up the Madeley Incline, a modest gradient which was a challenge to the small engines of the day.

By 1841, the Chester line was seen as a starting point for a new trunk line to the port of Holyhead, to provide the fastest route to Ireland, and the importance of Crewe as a junction station began to be established. This was given further endorsement when the Manchester and Birmingham Railway, a separate undertaking which had hoped to build a wholly independent line linking the two cities, shorter than the GJR, decided that it would be uneconomical to compete with that line over the greater part of its length: it decided to divert its own line to meet the GJR at Crewe. Teething squabbles between the companies delayed the running of through services for a while and the M&B had to build a temporary station of their own; part of this survives today as an isolated platform next to the North Junction, at the start of the line to Manchester.

In 1842, the GJR decided to move its locomotive works from Edge Hill in Liverpool to Crewe, siting the works to the north of the junction between the Warrington and Chester lines. To house the workforce and company management, the town of Crewe was built by the company to the north of the works.

=== London and North Western Railway ===
In 1846, the GJR merged with the London and Birmingham to form the London and North Western Railway Company which, until its demise in 1923, was the largest company in the world. The new company extended the existing lines to Holyhead, the Warrington line to Lancaster and Carlisle, and the Manchester line to Leeds; it built the new Crewe and Shrewsbury Railway to Shrewsbury to join the joint GWR owned Shrewsbury and Hereford Railway, which provided connections to South Wales. The North Staffordshire Railway built a line from Stoke-on-Trent, joining the LNWR from the South East. Crewe was the centre of a wide-ranging railway network, and freight-handling facilities grew up to the south of the station.

To cope with the increase of traffic, the station was rebuilt in 1867 (according to WH Chaloner); the buildings facing each other on the present platforms 5 and 6 date from this time and were built under the supervision of William Baker. The listing by English Heritage describes them as:

mirrored design with bowed projections for the platform inspectors' offices, the 'greybeard' keystones and vivid polychromy ... one of the best pieces of mid-C19 platform architecture designed anywhere on the LNWR network, and as rare surviving examples nationally of buildings of a major junction station of this period.

At the same time, the works was redeveloped and enlarged, and the town also enlarged under the leadership of John Ramsbottom, a Todmorden man who had become locomotive superintendent. Locomotive construction, hitherto divided with Wolverton (on the London and Birmingham Railway) was concentrated at Crewe. Ramsbottom also built a steelworks, the first in the world to make large-scale use of the Bessemer process, as only the LNWR required enough steel to keep a Bessemer plant continuously occupied. He also introduced mass-production techniques, whereby as many parts as possible were identical between one engine and another.

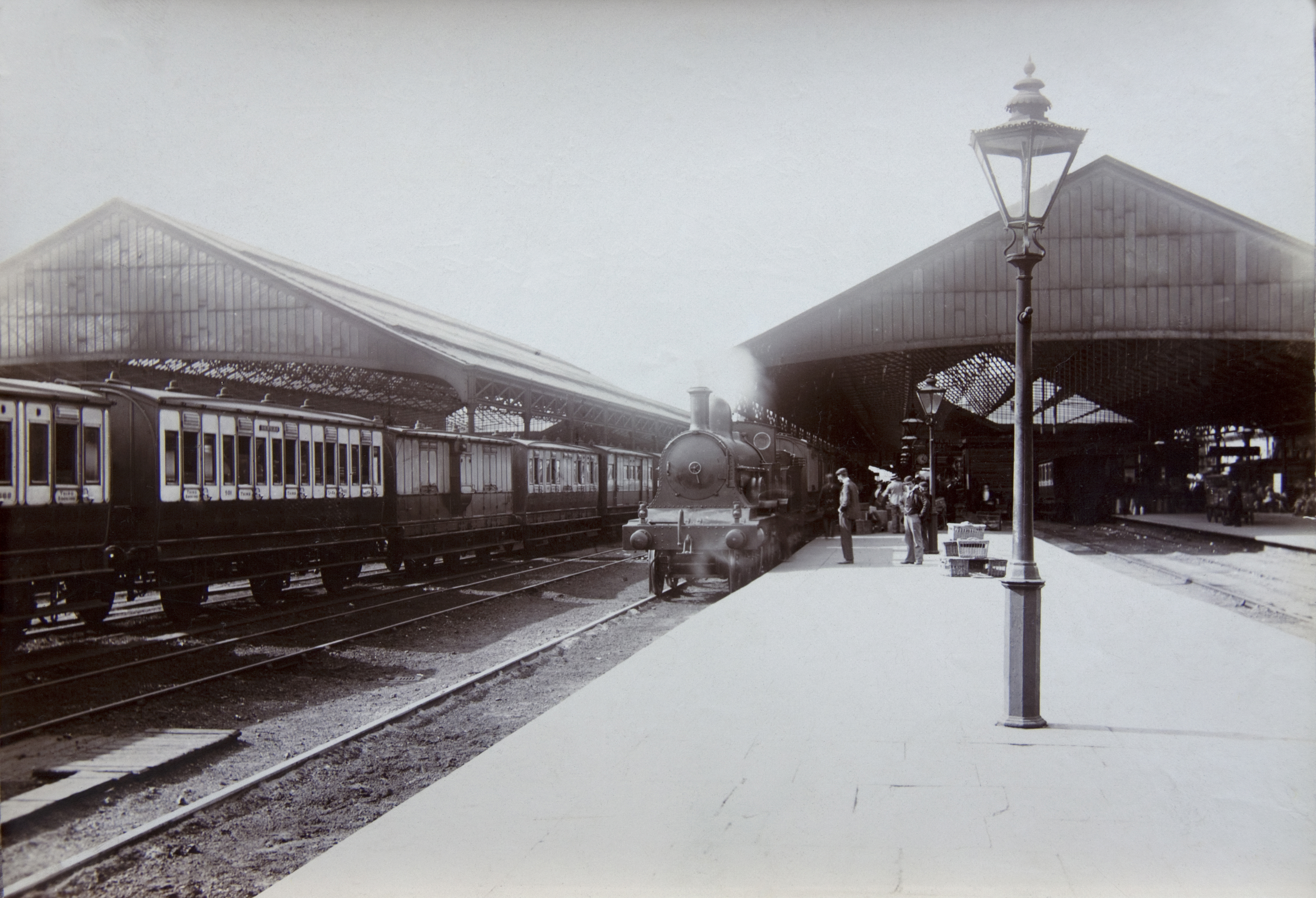
Crewe station around 1900

Ramsbottom retired in 1871 and was succeeded by the legendary Frank Webb, a colourful and controversial figure who was known as The Uncrowned King of Crewe.

By the 1890s, a survey revealed 1,000 trains passing within a 24-hour period. Half of these were freight trains which did not need to call at the station, so the company decided to build a separate four-track railway line passing to the west of the station, joining the existing lines beyond the north and south junctions, burrowing beneath them and avoiding them completely. Plans for the "independent lines" were approved in 1895 and construction lasted from 1896 to 1901. Over 1,000 labourers were employed on what was known as the "big dig" at a cost about £500,000 (equivalent to £53,130,000 in 2025). This undertaking also included a marshalling yard to the south of the station at Basford Hall, a revolutionary tranship shed which allowed fast transfer of freight from wagons to road vehicles under cover. The station was enlarged between 1903 and 1907, by providing eight through platforms each one-quarter mile (0.4 km) long. The cost of the improvements was £1,000,000 (equivalent to £104,010,000 in 2025).

=== London, Midland and Scottish Railway ===
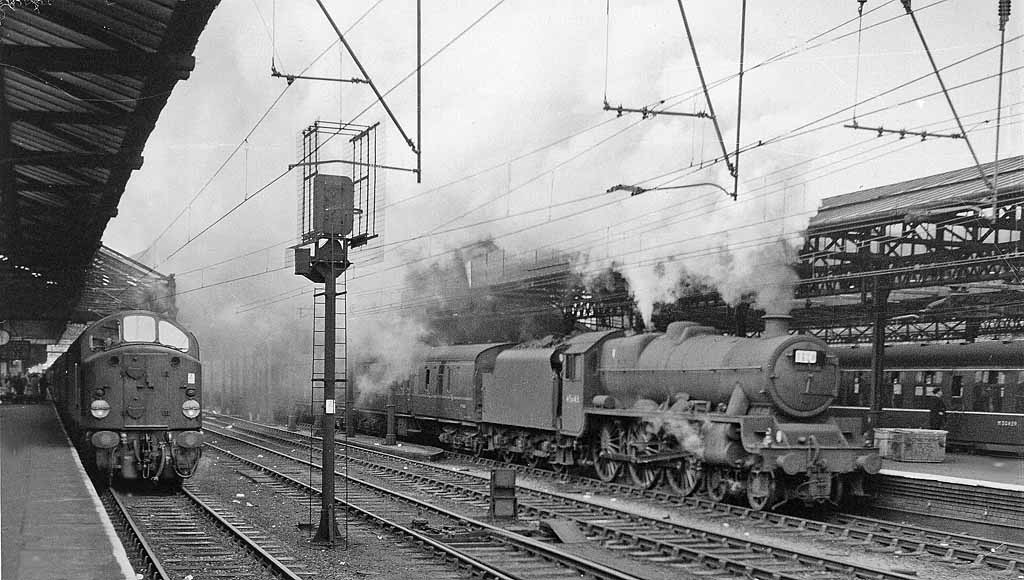
View northward on platform 4 in 1962, with an English-Electric Type 4 to the left and a 6P Jubilee to the right

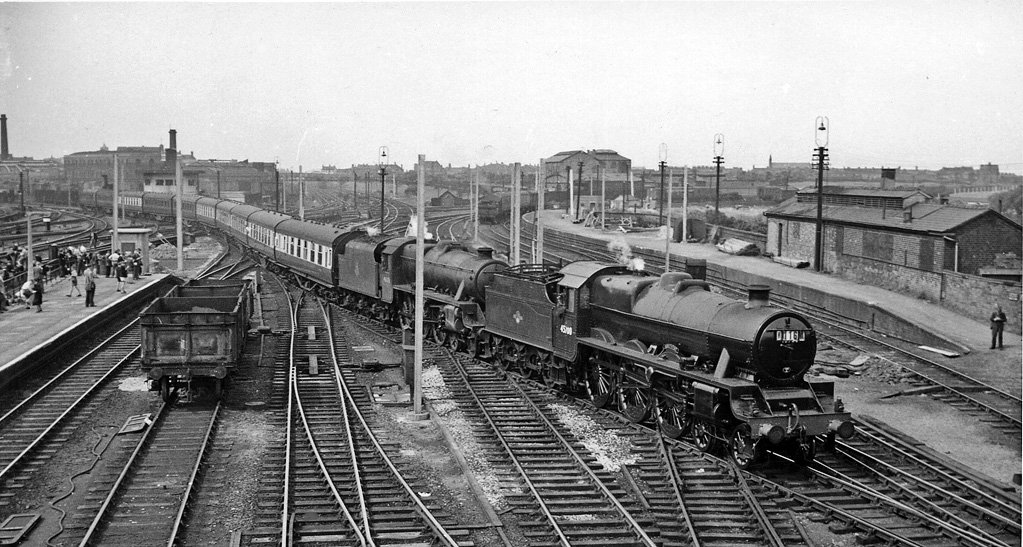
View northward from the footbridge at the north end of the station in 1958

In 1923, the LNWR became part of the London, Midland and Scottish Railway group; Crewe remained the major centre for locomotive construction. In 1938–39, the signal boxes at North and South Junctions were completely reconstructed as massive concrete structures to withstand air raids and remained in use until the resignalling project in 1985. The North Junction signal box can now be visited as part of the Crewe Heritage Centre. Although the railway station is virtually synonymous with the town of Crewe, it was not actually incorporated within the borders of the borough of Crewe until the late 1930s, as it lies about 1 mile (1.6 km) to the south-east of the actual town centre.

Train operation at Crewe changed little in over fifty years, with the exception of two new signal boxes and associated greatly improved colour light signalling, track circuiting and electrically operated track points. The trains did become longer and heavier and were hauled by larger engines, which required increased supplies of water to be taken on board before departure, but the number of passenger trains using Crewe station and the method of operation did not vary greatly despite the passage of two world wars. Trains continued to divide at Crewe with the front portion for Manchester and the rear for Liverpool. The station pilot engine always had a pair of restaurant cars in a bay platform ready to attach to a morning service to London. Always there were extra coaches waiting to be attached to overcrowded trains. In addition to passengers there were vast quantities of mail, parcels and even live animals and birds of all descriptions transported in specially designed transit crates. When necessary the station staff had to feed and water these special passengers, which travelled in copious luggage vans.

=== British Railways ===
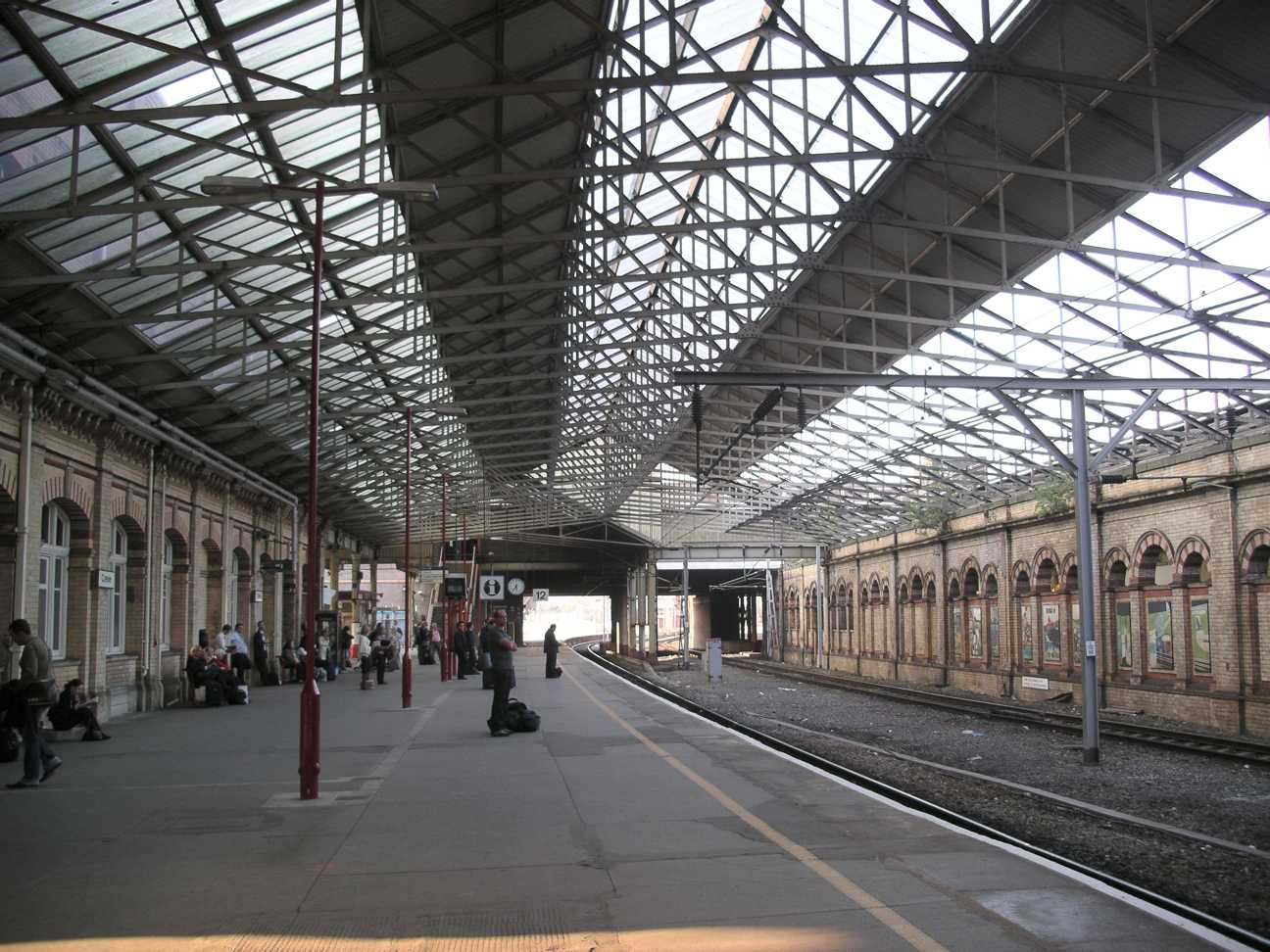
In the early 1900s, the station gained an extra six platforms to cope with traffic. However, as part of a major resignalling project in 1985, five of these platforms were taken out of use, with only platform 12 (pictured) remaining.

In 1948, the LMS was nationalised as British Railways, London Midland Region. Nationalisation greatly facilitated the modernisation of British Railways and, after a false start developing new improved steam engines, electrification came, along with diesel power and fixed-formation air-braked trains. These changes had a significant effect on Crewe station. Notably, the variation in station use caused firstly by the electrification in stages of the West Coast Main Line between 1959 and 1974, and secondly by the general end of steam traction on Britain's railways.

Following the completion of electrification in 1974, trains did not need to change locomotives at Crewe, except for the London to Chester and Holyhead service. Many locomotive hauled trains were replaced by electric or diesel multiple unit trains, with much faster turn-round times. Additionally, two local branch lines had closed, which resulted in fewer trains terminating at Crewe. However, compensating for the decline of local passenger traffic, the reduction in mail and parcels traffic and the total elimination of livestock carriage, came the great increase in inter-city passenger traffic and the need for even faster, smoother and more efficient handling of passenger trains.

In 1963, the architects to the London Midland Region of British Railways provided a Porte-cochère at the passenger entrance on Nantwich Road. It was constructed of eight laminated wood Hyperbolic paraboloid shells. This was replaced between 1983 and 1985 with the current steel structure.

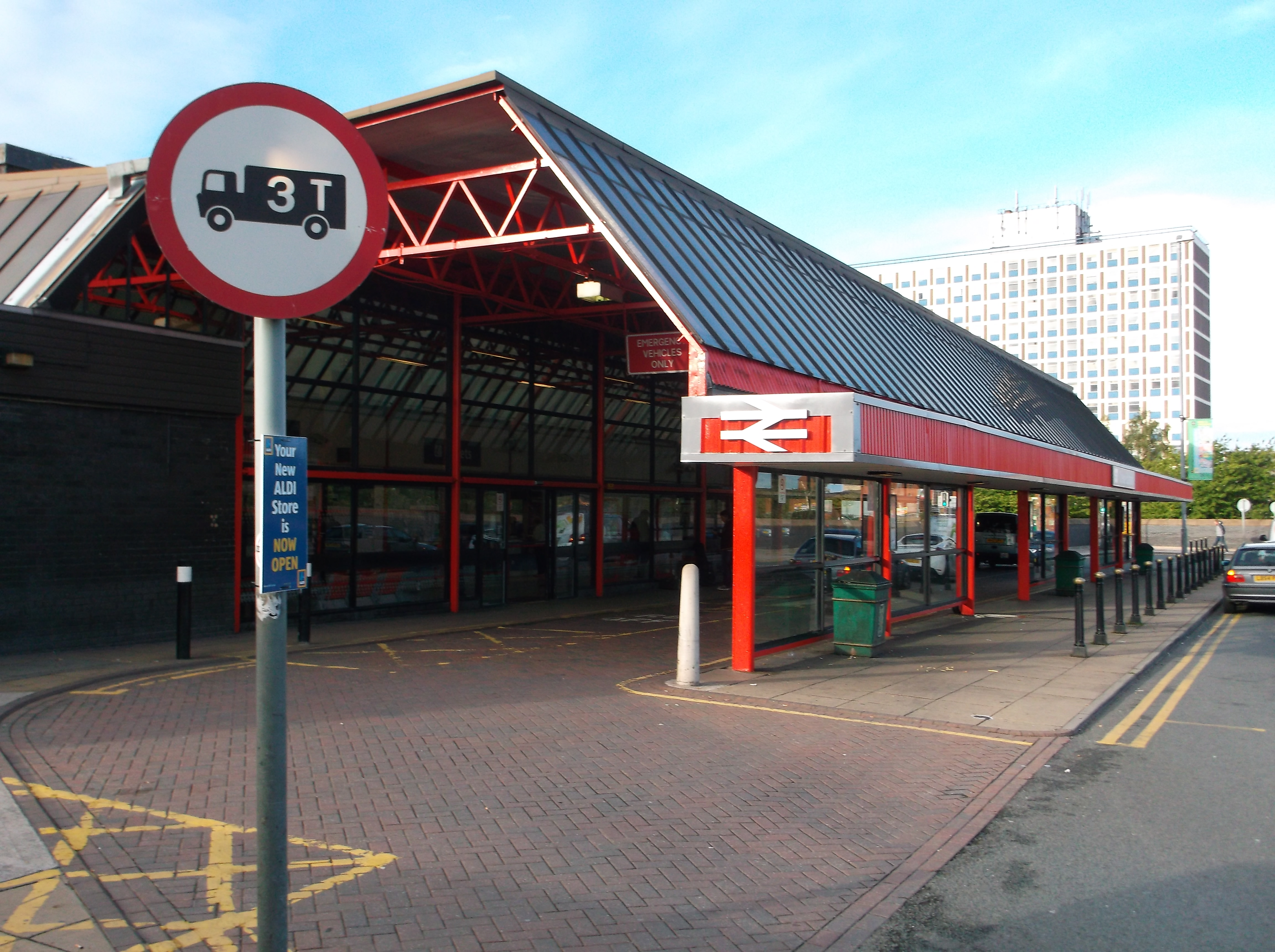
The main entrance to Crewe station, dating from the 1980s refurbishment

In 1985, in a £14.3 million scheme, the track layout was modernised and simplified, eliminating many points and crossings and allowing 80 mph (130 km/h) running over the North Junction. At the same time all but one of the six 1902 extension platforms were taken out of use. Four Class 40 locomotives were reallocated to this work in 1985, and were renumbered as 97405–97408 for the engineering duties.

=== Present day ===
In 2007, Network Rail published a proposal to replace the existing Crewe station with a new station located approximately 1 mile (1.6 km) to the south. A Crewe Town station was also proposed nearer the town centre on the Chester line, with a shuttle service to the new main station. In 2009, the station was identified as one of the ten worst category B interchange stations for mystery shopper assessment of fabric and environment.

The proposal to move the station was abandoned in 2010 and the current building was renovated instead. Cheshire East Council implemented a regeneration master plan for Crewe, which included the station.

In 2011, Cheshire East Council purchased the former Royal Mail depot and Weston House for £2.75 million. The council demolished the two buildings and created a new entrance to the station, as well as a 244 space car park and a secure bike parking structure, at a cost of £7 million. The construction work was undertaken by Balfour Beatty. The new entrance has step-free access and connects passengers to the station through an underground walkway. There is a ticket vending machine at this entrance, as well as unstaffed ticket barriers.

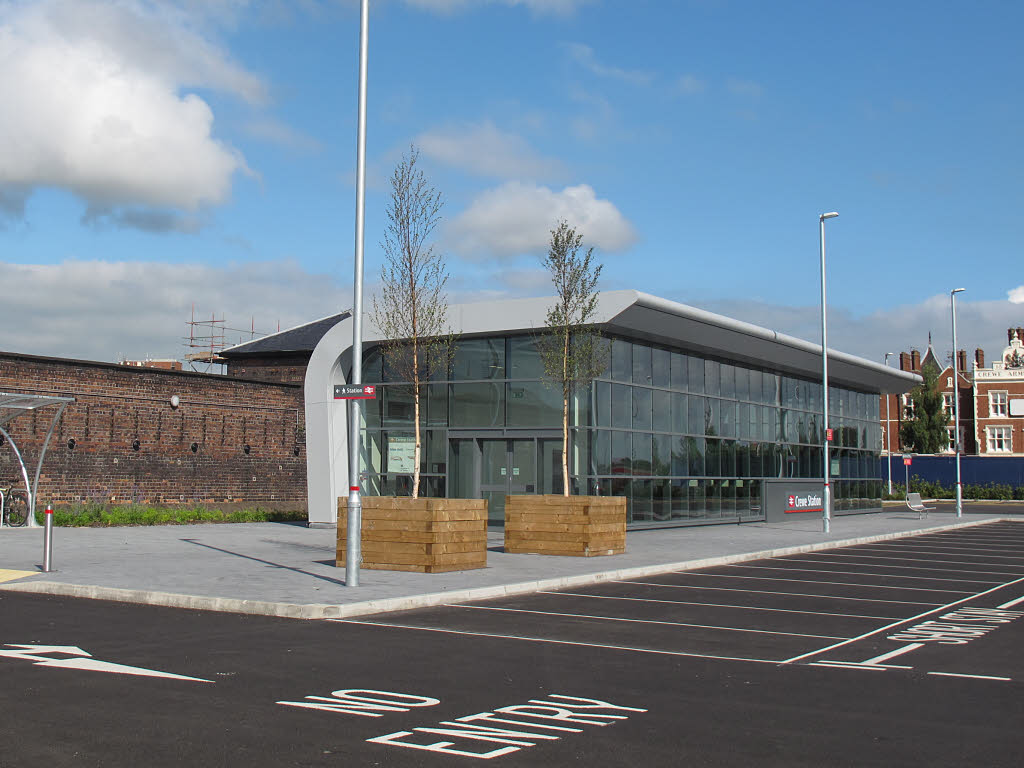
The Weston Road entrance, added in 2014

In August 2016, the station buildings of 1867 were added to the National Heritage List for England as a Grade II listed building. The structures included in the listing comprise two station buildings on separate platforms and two screen walls, one to the east and the other to the west of the station.

With seven train operating companies calling, Crewe is tied with Doncaster, Edinburgh Waverley, Liverpool Lime Street and Liverpool South Parkway for the highest number calling at a UK station.

=== Accidents and incidents ===
On 7 November 1980, two freight trains collided at Crewe station.

== Future ==
In January 2013, it was announced that the existing Crewe station would be a stop on the western branch of the planned HS2 high-speed rail route.

A new platform would be built on the Manchester independent lines to the west of the station, meaning that services will not have to cross the West Coast Main Line from Manchester Piccadilly or the Marches Line to South Wales.

Following the Crewe Hub consultation, which ran from July to October 2017, it was planned that five to seven trains per hour would stop at Crewe; plans for a new service to Manchester via Stafford, Stoke-on-Trent and Macclesfield was also proposed. This would have been made possible by extending the existing platform 5 to 400 metres, allowing services to split and serve these additional destinations. It was also planned that a new transfer deck would be built; this would have allowed passengers to change between the proposed new Manchester independent lines platform and the existing Crewe station.

However, on 4 October 2023, Prime Minister Rishi Sunak announced the cancellation of this Phase 2a of the HS2 development at the Conservative Party Conference.

From May 2026, Transport for Wales plan to extend their existing Crewe to Chester shuttle to Wrexham General.

From Summer 2026, there are plans to increase connectivity from Crewe. West Midlands Trains announced plans to extend the existing hourly service between Crewe and Stafford via Stoke-on-Trent. Northbound services are proposed to continue to Manchester Airport via Wilmslow and Styal, whilst southbound services would extend to Birmingham New Street via Willenhall and Darlaston.

From June 2026, Lumo plan to launch five trains a day to London Euston southbound and Preston northbound, with four continuing to Stirling. Of which, Crewe will be served by two southbound services and three northbound services. This would be the 8th train operating company serving the station, thereby overtaking both Doncaster, Edinburgh Waverley, Liverpool Lime Street and Liverpool South Parkway as the station with the most train operating companies served.

== Layout ==
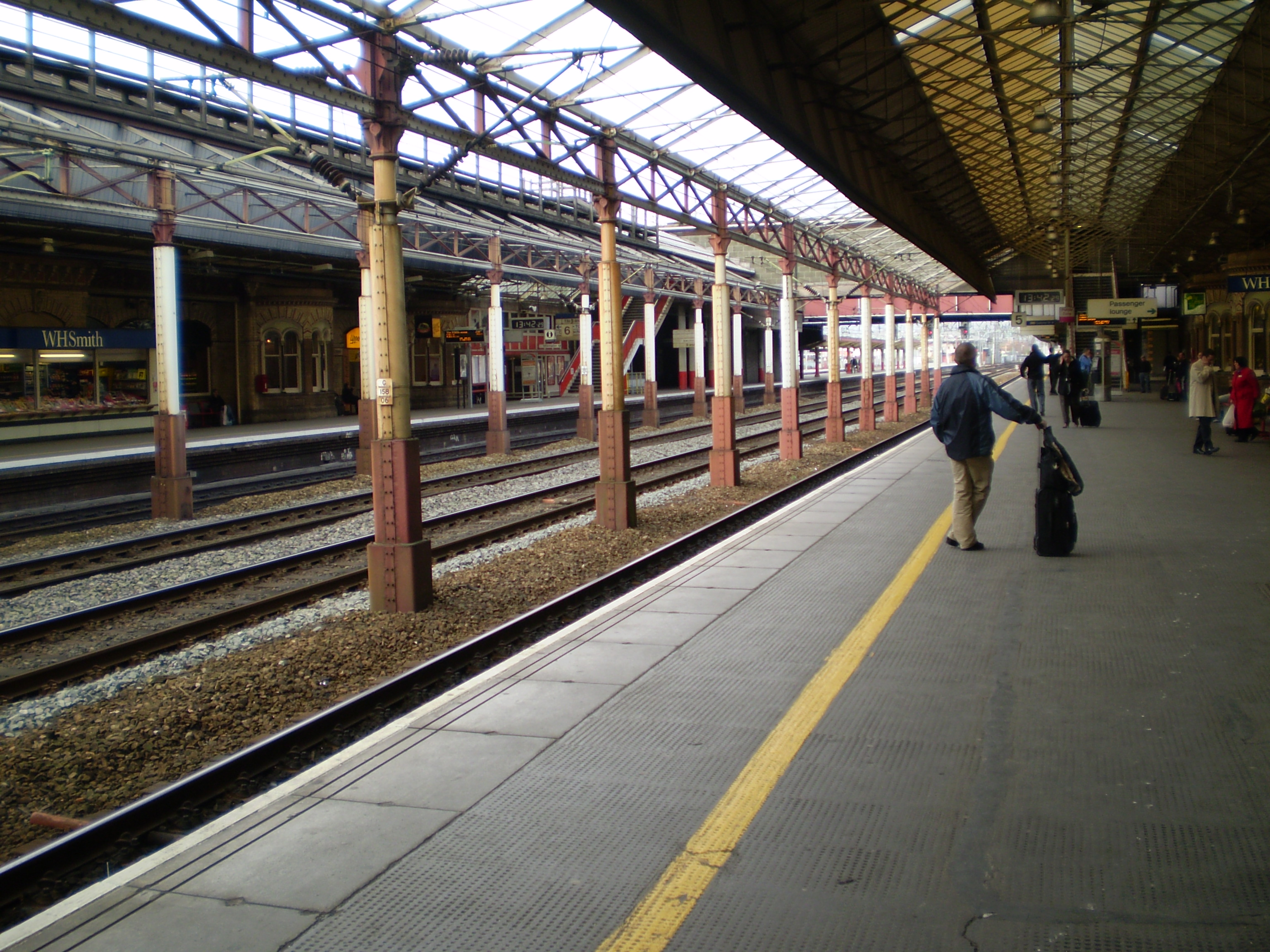
Platforms five and six are used primarily for express traffic along the West Coast Main Line

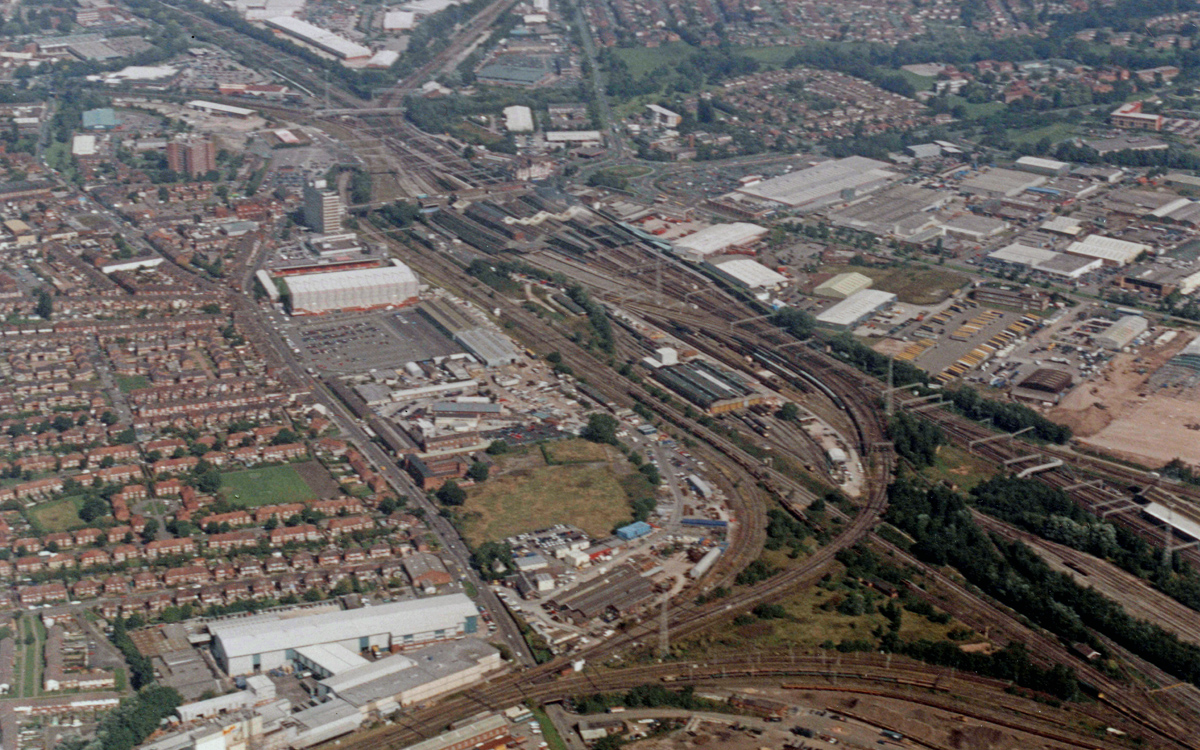
Crewe station looking north-east, showing the six converging railway routes

Platform use:

- Platform 1 - Northern Trains stopping services to and from Manchester Piccadilly; CrossCountry services to Manchester Piccadilly; occasionally Avanti West Coast northbound services to Manchester Piccadilly and southbound services to London Euston.
- Platform 2 - East Midlands Railway services
- Platform 3 - London Northwestern Railway services via Stoke-on-Trent
- Platform 4 - Extra capacity.
- Platform 5 - Avanti West Coast northbound services to Manchester Piccadilly and southbound to Birmingham New Street and London Euston; West Midlands Trains services to Birmingham New Street; Transport for Wales services to Cardiff; CrossCountry services to Bournemouth.
- Platform 6 - Transport for Wales services northbound to Manchester Piccadilly and southbound to Cardiff and beyond; West Midlands Trains services to Birmingham New Street and Liverpool Lime Street. Some Avanti West Coast northbound services to Preston and Glasgow Central and southbound to London Euston also use this platform.
- Platform 7 - Extra capacity.
- Platform 8 - Transport for Wales stopping services to and from Shrewsbury.
- Platform 9 - Transport for Wales services to Chester and Holyhead.
- Platform 10 - Extra capacity.
- Platform 11 - Avanti West Coast northbound services to Blackpool, Edinburgh, Liverpool, Chester and North Wales. London Northwestern Railway northbound services to Liverpool Lime Street.
- Platform 12 - London Northwestern Railway services to London Euston via Rugeley Trent Valley; usually used for railtours.

== Services ==
Eight train operating companies call at Crewe, which is the highest number for any British railway station. Their general off-peak weekday service patterns in trains per hour/day (tph/tpd) are as follows:

Avanti West Coast:

- 4 tph to London Euston; of which:
  - 3 tph take the Trent Valley Line
  - 1 tph runs via Birmingham New Street
- 1 tph to Manchester Piccadilly, via Stockport
- 1 tph to Liverpool Lime Street, via Runcorn
- 1 tph to Chester; of which:
  - Some services continue to Holyhead or Wrexham General
- 1 tp2h to Edinburgh Waverley, via Preston
- 1 tp2h to Glasgow Central, via Preston.

Caledonian Sleeper:

- 1 tpd to Aberdeen/Fort William/Inverness, dividing at Edinburgh Waverley
- 1 tpd to London Euston; set-down only and not for boarding passengers.

CrossCountry:

- 2 tpd to Bournemouth, via Birmingham New Street
- 1 tpd to Manchester Piccadilly.

East Midlands Railway:

- 1 tph to Lincoln Central, via Derby, Nottingham and Newark Castle; of which:
  - 3 tpd terminate at Nottingham.

London Northwestern Railway:

- 2 tph to Birmingham New Street, via Wolverhampton
- 2 tph to Liverpool Lime Street, via Runcorn
- 1 tph to London Euston, via Nuneaton
- 1 tph to Stafford, via Stoke-on-Trent.

Lumo:

- 3 tpd to Stirling
- 2 tpd to London Euston
- 1 tpd to Preston.

Northern Trains:

- 2 tph to Manchester Piccadilly
  - 1 tph via Stockport
  - 1 tph via Manchester Airport on the Styal Line.

Transport for Wales:

- 1 tph to Manchester Piccadilly, via Stockport
- 1 tph to Chester
- 1 tph to Cardiff Central, via Shrewsbury; of which:
  - 1 tp2h continue to Fishguard Harbour, Milford Haven or Pembroke Dock, via Carmarthen
- 1 tp2h to Shrewsbury.

Preceding station	National Rail	Following station
Wilmslow	Transport for Wales Welsh Marches Line	Shrewsbury
Terminus	Transport for Wales Welsh Marches Line	Nantwich
Chester	Transport for Wales North Wales Coast Line	Terminus
Terminus	Northern Trains Crewe–Manchester line	Sandbach
Terminus	East Midlands Railway Crewe–Derby line	Alsager
Terminus	London Northwestern Railway London-Crewe	Stafford towards
Terminus	London Northwestern Railway Stafford-Crewe	Alsager towards
Winsford towards	London Northwestern Railway Birmingham-Liverpool	Stafford towards
Chester	Avanti West Coast North Wales Main Line	Stafford
Wilmslow	Avanti West Coast West Coast Main Line; Manchester-Crewe-London	Stafford
Hartford	Avanti West Coast West Coast Main Line; Liverpool-London	Milton Keynes Central
Runcorn	Avanti West Coast West Coast Main Line; Liverpool-London	Milton Keynes Central
Warrington Bank Quay	Avanti West Coast West Coast Main Line; Edinburgh/Glasgow/Blackpool to London	Stafford
Stockport	CrossCountry CrossCountry Network (Limited service)	Stafford
Manchester Piccadilly	CrossCountry CrossCountry Network (Limited service)	Stafford
Preston	Caledonian Sleeper Highland Sleeper	Birmingham International
Preston	Lumo; London-Stirling	Nuneaton
Preston	Lumo; London-Stirling	London Euston
	Historical railways	
Worleston; Line open, station closed	London and North Western Railway; Chester and Crewe Railway	Terminus
Minshull Vernon; Line open, station closed	London and North Western Railway; Grand Junction Railway	Basford; Line open, station closed
Terminus	London and North Western Railway; Crewe and Shrewsbury Railway	Gresty; Line open, station closed
Terminus	Great Western Railway; Nantwich and Market Drayton Railway	Gresty; Line open, station closed
Terminus	London, Midland and Scottish Railway; Crewe and Shrewsbury Railway	Willaston; Line open, station closed
Terminus	North Staffordshire Railway; Crewe to Derby line	Radway Green & Barthomley; Line open, station closed
	Future services	
Wilmslow	London Northwestern Railway Manchester Airport to Birmingham New Street	Alsager
Warrington Bank Quay	TBA; Northern Powerhouse Rail to High Speed 2 link	Birmingham Curzon Street or Birmingham Interchange

== See also ==
- Listed buildings in Crewe
