= Nantwich and Market Drayton Railway =

Railway line in England

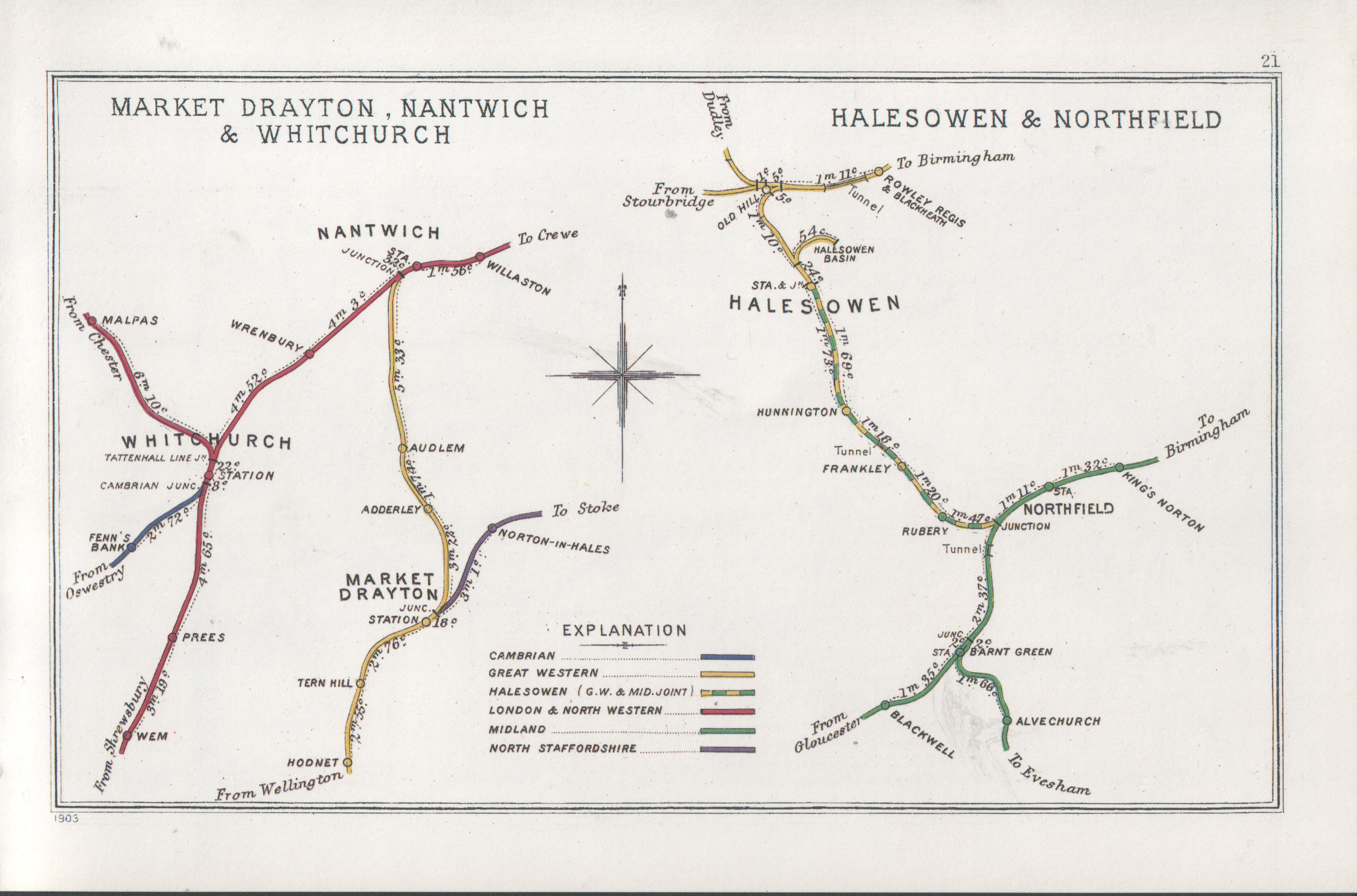
Junction Diagram

The Nantwich and Market Drayton Railway was a standard gauge railway line which began as a single line branch in the early 1860s and rapidly became part of the Great Western Railway's (GWR) double track Wellington to Nantwich Railway, which had through trains to Crewe. It carried through freight and local passenger traffic until its closure in the 1960s. Market Drayton was renowned for the manufacture of gingerbread, hence the line acquired the nickname the "Gingerbread Line".

== History ==
Nantwich and Market Drayton Railway Act 1861
- Act of Parliament
- Parliament of the United Kingdom
- Long title: An Act for making a Railway from the London and North-western Railway at Nantwich in the County of Chester to Market Drayton in the County of Salop.
- Citation: 24 & 25 Vict. c. xliv

Dates
- Royal assent: 7 June 1861

This company was provisionally formed in 1860 as the Market Drayton and Madeley Railway, then changed its name to Nantwich and Market Drayton Railway on or before 3 April 1861, and incorporated by the Nantwich and Market Drayton Railway Act 1861 (24 & 25 Vict. c. xliv) on 7 June 1861. The first chairman was Henry Reginald Corbet, of nearby Adderley Hall. The contract for construction was £44,750 (equivalent to £4,700,000 in 2025) and the first sod was cut on 16 January 1862.

The single track line was built from the London and North Western Railway (LNWR) Crewe and Shrewsbury Railway line just south of Nantwich to a terminus at Market Drayton, a distance of ten miles. The engineer for the line was Mr. Gardener and contractors were Thomas Brassey and William Field. The line opened on 19 October 1863.

Proposals were for the railway to be worked by the LNWR, but instead the Great Western Railway took on this role and worked the nominally independent line until it was taken over by the GWR under the Great Western Railway (Additional Powers) Act 1897 (60 & 61 Vict. c. ccxlviii).

The line was doubled during 1866–67, to match the Wellington and Drayton Railway which opened in October 1867, thus providing a link for the GWR between the Midlands and the Northwest.

The North Staffordshire Railway line from Stoke to Market Drayton opened in January 1870, joining the line at Silverdale Junction, just north of Market Drayton.

An engine shed and turntable which had been built at Market Drayton were no longer needed when the Wellington and Drayton Railway opened, as locomotives were then based at Wellington, so they were sold to the North Staffordshire Railway.

During 1934–5 unstaffed halts were opened at Coole Pilate and Coxbank.

Passenger service was withdrawn on 9 September 1963. Freight service continued until 1967, the line providing a relief route during the electrification of the London-Crewe line. The lifting of the line was completed during 1970.

== Traffic ==
Passenger traffic was modest, typically about six local stopping trains a day in each direction. Most ran between Crewe and Wellington, some continued to/from Manchester to the north and Worcester or Wolverhampton (for Paddington) to the south, or included through coaches for the extended routes. During the line's latter years excursion trains were seen, and in its final year the "Pines Express" between Manchester and Bournemouth used the line.

Freight traffic was much more significant. Typically there were about twenty trains a day in each direction, of which two would be local goods, and the remainder would be through traffic, either non-stop over the line or stopping only at Market Drayton. Principally these carried manufactured goods from the Midlands to the Northwest, also fruit from the Worcester area. There was little coal and mineral traffic.

== Preservation/future use ==
On New Year's Day 1992, the Market Drayton Railway Preservation Society (renamed Nantwich & Market Drayton Railway Society in 2010) was set up in order to preserve what remained of the old railway line between Nantwich and Market Drayton on the Cheshire–Shropshire border.

A new site would have been required for Market Drayton as the old site no longer exists now being a supermarket, while other parts of the line between Coxbank and Audlem have changed slightly since the line's heyday.

As of April 2012 the society held meetings most months to provide talks about how a part of the line could be preserved.

In 2017, the Shropshire Star released an article detailing calls by Owen Meredith who was a candidate for the constituency of Newcastle-Under-Lyme. He called for a feasibility study into reopening the entire line from Market Drayton to as far as Newcastle-Under-Lyme. He was quoted as saying "I want to see a feasibility study into re-opening the Market Drayton branch line or similar route to connect Newcastle with Stoke and HS2.“ This was further backed up by the MP for Stoudley near Market Drayton, Andrew Stanley, who was also quoted as saying "It would be better, and probably easier, to re-open the line through Audlem to Nantwich and on to Crewe to connect with HS2."

In January 2019, Campaign for Better Transport released a report identifying the line between Stoke and Wellington which was listed as Priority 2 for reopening. Priority 2 is for those lines which require further development or a change in circumstances (such as housing developments).
