= Crewe and Shrewsbury Railway =

UK railway line

The Crewe and Shrewsbury Railway was a railway line which was built by the London and North Western Railway (LNWR) to connect Crewe with the Shrewsbury and Hereford Railway which was jointly owned with GWR.

Authorised in 1853, planning difficulties accessing the GWR station at Shrewsbury delayed opening until 1858. Proving so successful for both companies to transport coal from the South Wales Valleys to industrial Northwest England, and finished goods in the opposite direction, it was doubled tracked by 1862.

Amalgamated into the London Midland and Scottish Railway in 1923, post nationalisation into British Railways, its services reduced as motor transport proved quicker more cost effective than its various branch lines. It now forms the northern section of Network Rail's Welsh Marches Line.

== Background ==
On 4 July 1837, the Grand Junction Railway (GJR) opened, linking the four largest cities of England by joining the existing Liverpool and Manchester Railway (L&MR) with the projected London and Birmingham Railway (L&BR). The line, which was the first long-distance railway in the world, ran from Curzon Street railway station in Birmingham to Dallam in Warrington, Cheshire, where it made an end-on junction with the Warrington and Newton Railway, a branch of the L&M. Conceived as a through route, the GJR was not interested in serving towns en-route. Wolverhampton, for instance, was by-passed by half a mile because it did not lie on the intended route.

Having been turned down by Nantwich, a station was built in the township of Crewe which formed part of the ancient parish of Barthomley, on the junction of a turnpike road linking the Trent and Mersey and the Shropshire Union canals. As soon as the station opened it was seen to be at a useful point to begin a branch line to the county town of Chester, facilitated by the 1840 construction of the Chester and Crewe Railway, extended in 1841 to Holyhead to provide the fastest route to Ireland.

In 1845 the GJR merged with the L&BR and L&MR to form the London and North Western Railway Company, which until its demise in 1923 was the largest company in the world. The new company extended the Warrington line to Lancaster and Carlisle, the Manchester line to Leeds, and built a new line to Shrewsbury to join the now jointly financed with the GWR Shrewsbury and Hereford Railway, which provided connections to South Wales.

== Shrewsbury and Hereford Railway ==
Parliament passed an act of Parliament, the Shrewsbury and Hereford Railway Act 1846 (9 & 10 Vict. c. cccxxv), allowing the new Shrewsbury and Hereford Railway (S&HR). Built to standard gauge and engineered by Thomas Brassey, the line was to cover 50.5 miles (81.3 km), following an approximate route of the valley of the River Wye.

At its southern end, it would connect the major market town of Hereford with the northern terminals the GWR's Hereford, Ross and Gloucester Railway and the LNWR's Newport, Abergavenny and Hereford Railway, allowing access through to the coal fields and ports of South Wales. A joint Railway Fete occurred on 6 December 1853, when all five companies connecting Hereford ran their first official trains into the town.

At its northern end, the S&HR connected with the GWR's railways:

- The Cambrian Line, for mid-Wales and Aberystwyth
- The Shrewsbury and Birmingham Railway for access to the Midlands
- The Shrewsbury and Chester Railway (S&CR), allowing a pan-Wales route from Cardiff to Holyhead

However, the major financial gain for both companies was the transport of coal from the South Wales Valleys to industrial Northwest England. At inception, the only way of this occurring was via the S&CR to Chester, so a more direct route was required.

== Construction ==
London and North Western Railway (Crewe and Shrewsbury Extension, &c.) Act 1853
- Act of Parliament
- Parliament of the United Kingdom
- Long title: An Act for enabling the London and North-western Railway Company to construct a Railway from Crewe to Shrewsbury, and other Works in connexion with their Undertaking; and for other Purposes relating thereto.
- Citation: 16 & 17 Vict. c. ccxvi

Dates
- Royal assent: 20 August 1853

Text of statute as originally enacted

The act of Parliament to approve the Crewe and Shrewsbury Railway, the London and North Western Railway (Crewe and Shrewsbury Extension, &c.) Act 1853 (16 & 17 Vict. c. ccxvi), was passed in August 1853. The House of Lords raised objections to the LNWR's proposed route into the GWR's Shrewsbury station, causing delays while alternative routes were considered.

A Railway commencing by a Junction with the Main Line of the London and North-western Railway in the Township of Crewe in the Parish of Barthomley in the County of Chester, and terminating in the Property numbered on the said Plans of such Railway 2 in the Parish of Holy Cross and Saint Giles in Shrewsbury in the County of Salop. — Section 3, London and North Western Railway (Crewe and Shrewsbury Extension, &c.) Act 1853 (16 & 17 Vict. c. ccxvi)

After approval of a route, the LNWR contracted Joseph Locke and John Edward Errington as engineers, and Thomas Brassey as the civil engineering developer. The 32.5 miles (52.3 km) route was constructed as a single track route, with the in-built option to increase to double track should traffic require. Completed at the budgeted cost of £10,000 per mile, the first train entered Shrewsbury station on 1 September 1858. It was thus the first railway in North Shropshire.

== Operations ==
The immediate success of the route, particularly revenue from coal traffic, meant the line was authorised to be upgraded to double track, which was completed in 1862.

The line's success showed other operators the importance of access to Crewe, with the GWR sponsored Oswestry, Ellesmere and Whitchurch Railway (OE&WR) proposed in 1860. Following ferocious arguments between the LNWR and GWR, Parliament authorised building the line in August 1861 with the Oswestry, Ellesmere and Whitchurch Railway Act 1861 (24 & 25 Vict. c. ccxxiii).

The first phase was restricted to the Whitchurch-Ellesmere section, with the onward section to Oswestry held over for a year in case of new GWR route developments. Engineered by Robert and Benjamin Piercey, the civil engineering contractor was Thomas Savin.

Facilities at Whitchurch were expanded by the LNWR to allow for trains using the new line, with the stations staff numbers reaching over 100 between the two wars. Intermediate stations were built by the OE&WR at Fenn's Bank, Bettisfield and Welshampton. The first public passenger service left Ellesmere for Whitchurch on 4 May 1863, and construction of the Ellesmere-Oswestry section was completed one year later. The total cost of the line was £200,000.

Following further proposals of railways between Crewe and Chester, by 1864 four companies were operating between Whitchurch and Machynlleth:

- OE&WR
- Oswestry and Newtown Railway
- Llanidloes and Newtown Railway
- Newtown and Machynlleth Railway

In July 1864, the government approved a share holder request that they were amalgamated, granting an act of Parliament to form the Cambrian Railways. The opening of a last section of line between Borth and Aberystwyth now enabled through trains to run from Whitchurch, a distance of 95.75 miles (154.09 km).

In 1870 the LNWR proposed the Whitchurch and Tattenhall Railway to break the GWR's monopoly on the Shrewsbury to Chester route. Opened in October 1872, little consideration was given to route or revenue, resulting in consistently low traffic volumes and a lifelong record of annual losses.

The construction of a British Army World War I training camp at Prees Heath, resulted in the construction of a private 1 mile (1.6 km) branch line, which left the mainline west between Whitchurch and Prees. Used to transport troops, supplies and equipment initially, the site developed as a hospital resulting in return dispersement trains.

In the 1923 Grouping of British railways, the GWR amalgamated with the Cambrian Railways, while the LNWR became part of the new London, Midland and Scottish Railway (LMS).

During World War II, Prees Heath was developed into a Royal Air Force airfield as RAF Tilstock, still with its own railway depot, barracks and hospital facilities. Despite this, the relatively rural and resultantly dark run of the combined S&HR and C&SR meant that the flow of coal to the industrial Northwest continued virtually unabated.

After the war, the newly nationalised British Railways suffered competition from new road transport competitors, assisted in their efforts by the Ministry of Defence selling off cheaply former military trucks and coaches. This resulted in a closure of the many branch lines, many before the Beeching Axe of the 1960s, reducing the Whitchurch of today to little more than an unstaffed halt.

== Today ==
Presently, the line remains open from Shrewsbury to Crewe, the northernmost section of Network Rails Welsh Marches Line. New modular colour light signalling was installed along the line in 2013, with the surviving intermediate manual signal boxes closed, level crossings automated and route supervision passing to the South Wales ROC in Cardiff.
