= Coole Pilate =

Civil parish in Cheshire, England

Coordinates: 53.016°N 2.514°W

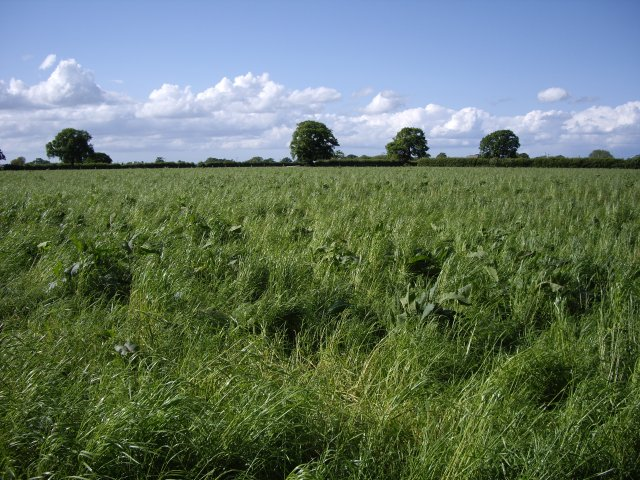
- Typical flat farmland in Coole Pilate

- Location within Cheshire
- OS grid reference: SJ655466
- Civil parish: Coole Pilate
- Unitary authority: Cheshire East
- Ceremonial county: Cheshire
- Region: North West
- Country: England
- Sovereign state: United Kingdom
- Post town: NANTWICH
- Postcode district: CW5
- Dialling code: 01270
- Police: Cheshire
- Fire: Cheshire
- Ambulance: North West
- UK Parliament: Chester South and Eddisbury

Coole Pilate is a civil parish in the unitary authority of Cheshire East and the ceremonial county of Cheshire, England, which lies to the north of Audlem and to the south of Nantwich. The area is predominantly rural with scattered farms, and a total population of 60 people. At the 2011 Census the population remained less than 100. Details are included in the civil parish of Austerson. Nearby villages include Broomhall Green, Hankelow, Hatherton and Newhall.

== History ==
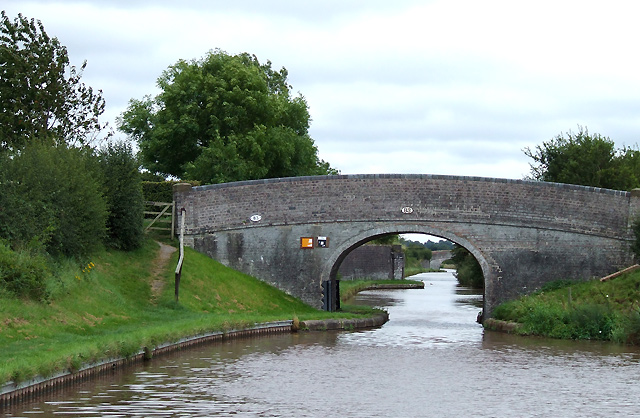
Shropshire Union Canal at Austin's Bridge; the old railway bridge is in the background

Coole Pilate means a croft growing pill oats. A brine spring is shown on an 1831 map of the area, and is presumably the source of local place names such as "Brine Pit".

Little is known of the early history of the area. A square perforated stone hoe believed to date from the Bronze Age was found in a field to the west of Old Hall in 1936, suggesting possible settlement during that period. Coole Pilate is not mentioned by name in the Domesday Book of 1086. Most of the area of the modern civil parish fell within the ancient parish of Acton in the Nantwich Hundred; it was served by St Mary's Church, Acton. A loom weight was found in the area, suggesting that weaving was carried out locally around the 16th century. There is evidence of a local brickworks and pottery around the 18th–19th centuries.

In around 1836, landowners in the parish included the Earl of Kilmorey, a major landowner locally, as well as Charles Wicksted, Richard Johnson and the Reverend Jeremiah Smith. The Birmingham and Liverpool Junction Canal, now part of the Shropshire Union, was completed in 1835. The Nantwich and Market Drayton Railway, constructed in 1863, ran north–south through the parish; a halt at Coole Pilate was opened in 1935. The halt closed in 1963 and the line was subsequently dismantled, although the supports of the former railway bridge over the Shropshire Union Canal still remain near Austin's Bridge.

The parish had a platoon in the Home Guard during the Second World War, which guarded the canal bridges and reinforced the RAF at the nearby Hack Green Radar Station.

== Governance ==
Coole Pilate has been administered since 1950 by Sound and District Parish Council. From 1974 the civil parish was served by Crewe and Nantwich Borough Council, which was succeeded on 1 April 2009 by the new unitary authority of Cheshire East. Coole Pilate falls in the parliamentary constituency of Chester South and Eddisbury, which has been represented since the 2024 general election by Aphra Brandreth of the Conservative Party.

== Geography, transport and economy ==
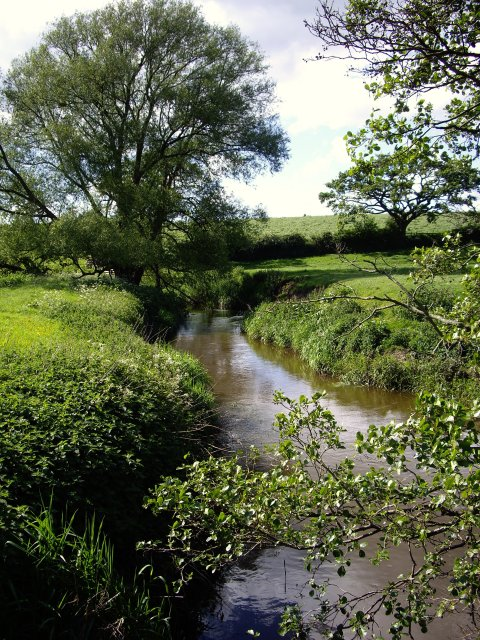
River Weaver by the South Cheshire Way

The civil parish has a total area of 715 acres (289 ha). The terrain is relatively flat, with an average elevation of around 50 metres. The land use is almost entirely agricultural. The Shropshire Union Canal runs north–south through the parish; it is crossed by the Cool Lane roadbridge and the Austin's and Hall's footbridges. The River Weaver runs along the eastern border, and Finnaker brook runs north–south in the west of the parish. Several small meres and ponds are scattered across the farmland, and there are also a few small areas of woodland.

Coole Lane, which connects Nantwich with the A525 near Audlem, runs north–south through the parish and is the major road. Brine Pits Lane runs from Coole Lane to Brinepits Farm. The A529 lies to the east of the parish. The South Cheshire Way long-distance footpath runs east–west through the parish.

== Demography ==
In 2006, the total population of the civil parish was estimated as 50. The 2001 census recorded a population of 60. Historical population figures were 39 (1801), 43 (1851), 53 (1901) and 70 (1951).

== Landmarks ==
Coole Pilate Chapel on Coole Lane at SJ651472 was built in 1850 by the Wesleyan Methodist Association. Other landmarks include the large farms of Old Hall at the junction of Coole Lane and Brine Pits Lane (SJ651469), and Brinepits at the end of Brine Pits Lane (SJ662466).

== Education ==
There are no educational facilities within the civil parish. Coole Pilate falls within the catchment areas of Sound and District Primary School in Sound and Brine Leas High School in Nantwich.

== Notable residents ==
Isabella Whitney, the first woman known to have published secular poetry in the English language, is thought to have been born at Coole Pilate. Her brother, Geoffrey Whitney, is likewise believed to have been born there; also a poet, he is known for his collection Choice of Emblemes.
