= Sound, Cheshire =

Hamlet in Cheshire, England

Coordinates: 53.031°N 2.569°W

Sound
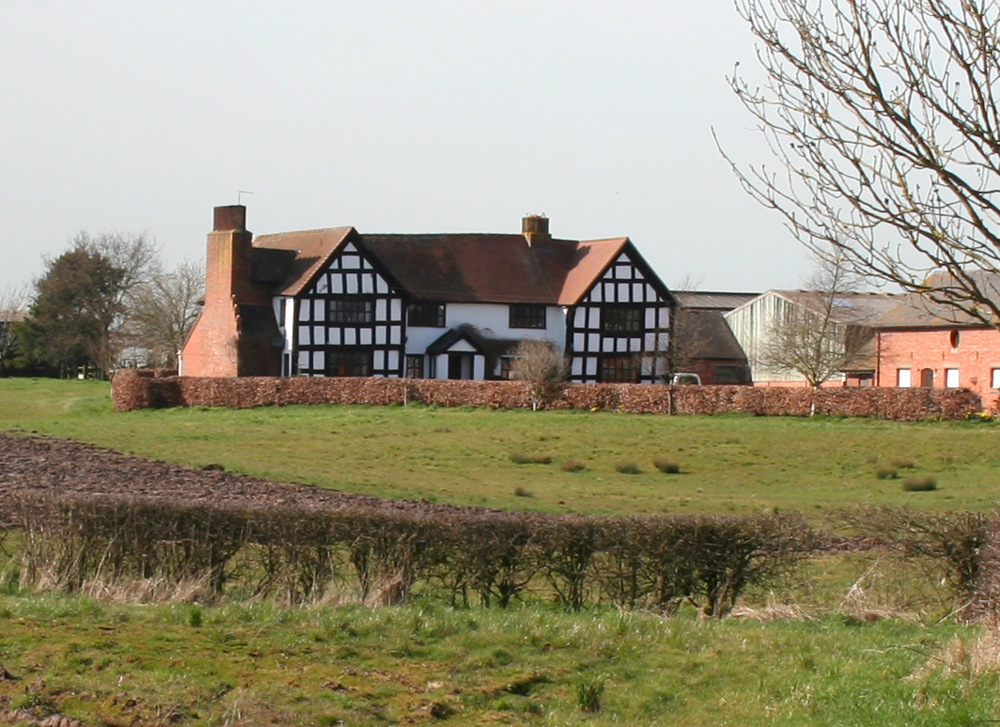
- Sound Oak Farmhouse

- Location within Cheshire
- Population: 239 (2011)
- OS grid reference: SJ619483
- Unitary authority: Cheshire East
- Ceremonial county: Cheshire
- Region: North West
- Country: England
- Sovereign state: United Kingdom
- Post town: NANTWICH
- Postcode district: CW5
- Dialling code: 01270
- UK Parliament: Chester South and Eddisbury

Sound is a hamlet (at SJ619483) and civil parish in the unitary authority of Cheshire East and the ceremonial county of Cheshire, England. The hamlet is located 3 1/4 miles (5.2 km) to the south west of Nantwich. The civil parish covers 1,089 acres (441 ha) and also includes the small settlements of Newtown and Sound Heath, with a total population at the 2011 census of 239. Nearby villages include Aston, Ravensmoor and Wrenbury.

The name is of Saxon origin and means "a sandy place". The first record of the township is in 1310. It was raided by Royalist forces in 1643, during the Civil War. The Methodist chapel was built in 1838, and a primary school on the boundary with Broomhall opened in 1876. Other historic buildings include a rare example of a malt kiln.

The River Weaver runs along the southern boundary and the Welsh Marches railway line crosses the parish. The area is mainly agricultural, with dairy farming predominating. The flat terrain has an average elevation of around 60 metres. There is a small Site of Special Scientific Interest and Local Nature Reserve named Sound Heath, which forms an important habitat for freshwater invertebrates and breeding birds. Nationally scarce species observed here include the mud snail, great raft spider, a species of water scavenger beetle and the beautiful snout moth.

== History ==
Sound, or Soond, is a name of Saxon origin which means a sandy place. Sound is not mentioned in the Domesday survey. In 1200–1300, there is evidence for a hamlet named Fouleshurst, which is thought to have been located near Fouleshurst (now Fullhurst) Hall on Sound Lane, in the north of the modern civil parish. However, no traces have yet been uncovered of this settlement. Records exist of the township of Sound itself from 1310. The area of the modern civil parish was divided between two administrative units in the Nantwich Hundred: part fell within Wrenbury chapelry, which was served by St Margaret's Church, Wrenbury, and part within the ancient parish of Acton, which was served by St Mary's Church, Acton. The earliest landowners were the Sound family, but the manor had passed to the Chetwode family by the reign of Edward IV (1461–1483) and by 1800, it was owned by the Cholmondeleys.

In April 1643, during the Civil War, Sound was one of several townships raided by Royalist forces. The diarist Edward Burghall wrote:

The Cavalries from Whitchurch and Cholmondeley came near to Nantwich ... and took great prey from Dorfold, Acton, Ravensmoor, Sound, and all that neighbourhood; namely, all the cows and young beasts they could find, with horses and household stuff from many, to a great value, and carried all away with them.

In 1831 there was a hopyard north of Sound Hall, which had a malt kiln. Two beerhouse keepers were recorded in Sound in 1850, and one of the cottages adjacent to Sound Hall is believed to have been an alehouse.

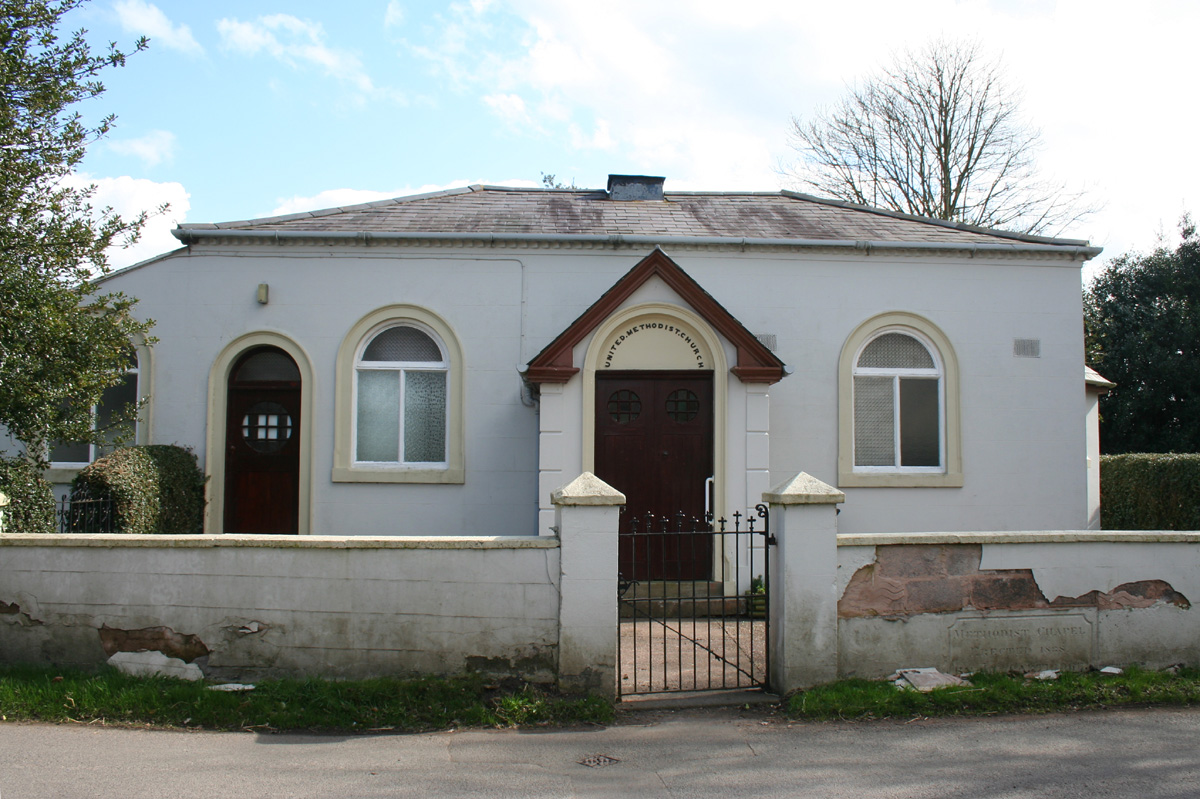
Broomhall and Sound Church

The Crewe and Shrewsbury Railway was approved in 1853. Construction employed engineers Joseph Locke and John Edward Errington and contractor Thomas Brassey, and the line opened on 1 September 1858. It passed through Sound with no station.

Broomhall Church, a Methodist chapel, was built in Newtown in 1838 by Joseph Cartlidge. A Primitive Methodist Chapel was constructed in 1875 at Sound Heath, and a Sunday School was added in the late 1930s. This chapel closed in 1973, when the congregation united with that of Broomhall Church, which was renamed Broomhall and Sound Church. Sound School (on the boundary with Broomhall) opened in 1876, with 58 pupils in its first year. During the Second World War, the school served as an emergency rest centre for evacuees. It was expanded with mobile classrooms in the late 20th century.

== Governance ==
Sound is administered by Sound and District Parish Council, jointly with the nearby civil parishes of Austerson, Baddiley, Baddington, Broomhall and Coole Pilate. Sound is represented by 4 councillors out of a total of 15. From 1974 the civil parish was served by Crewe and Nantwich Borough Council, which was succeeded on 1 April 2009 by the unitary authority of Cheshire East. Sound falls in the parliamentary constituency of Chester South and Eddisbury, which has been represented since the 2024 general election by Aphra Brandreth of the Conservative Party. It was previously part of the Eddisbury constituency, which since its establishment in 1983 had been held by the Conservative MPs Alastair Goodlad (1983–99), Stephen O'Brien (1999–2015), Antoinette Sandbach (2015–19) and Edward Timpson (2019–24).

== Geography, economy and transport ==
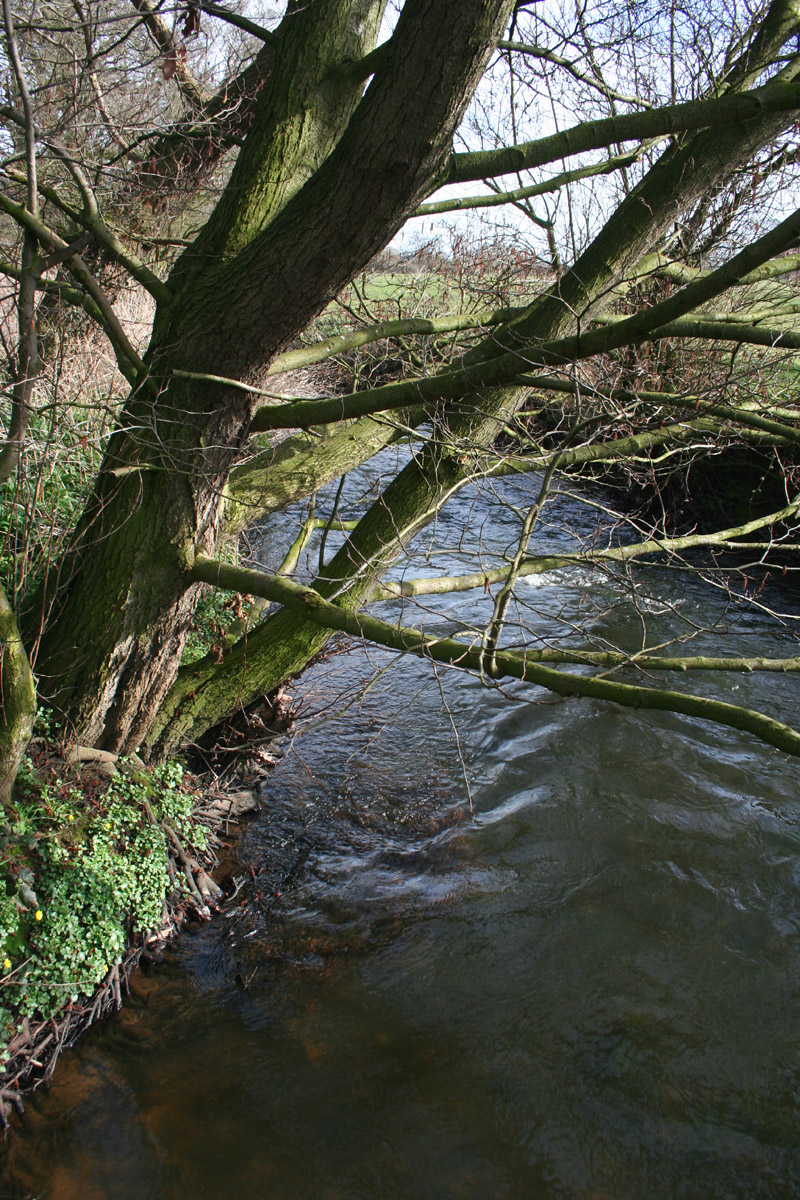
River Weaver at Paradise Bridge

The civil parish has a total area of 1,089 acres (441 ha). The underlying geology is Keuper marl, with glacial sand deposit providing light sandy soil at Sound Heath. The River Weaver and Edleston Brook form parts of the southern and northern boundaries of the parish, respectively. Several unnamed brooks also run through the parish, and many small meres and ponds are scattered across its farmland and woodland. The majority of the terrain is relatively flat, with an average elevation of around 60 metres; near the northern parish boundary and adjacent to the Weaver in the southwest the land is more undulating in character. There are several areas of woodland within the parish, including Sound Heath and Asphodel.

The small scattered settlements of Sound (SJ619483) and Sound Heath (SJ618479) are centred on the junction of Sound Lane and Wrenbury Heath Road. The hamlet of Newtown (SJ625480) lies adjacent to the A530, between Newtown Road and Wrenbury Heath Road. Occasional farmhouses and cottages also lie along Sound Lane and Wrenbury Heath Road. The area is predominantly rural, with the major land use being agricultural. Dairy farming predominates, but there is also sheep pasture, horse paddocks and some arable fields. There is an abattoir at Red Lion Farm in Sound Heath. A few small industrial and service enterprises operate within the parish, including television and video repairs (Sound Heath), metal fabricators (Sound Lane) and secretarial services (Newtown).

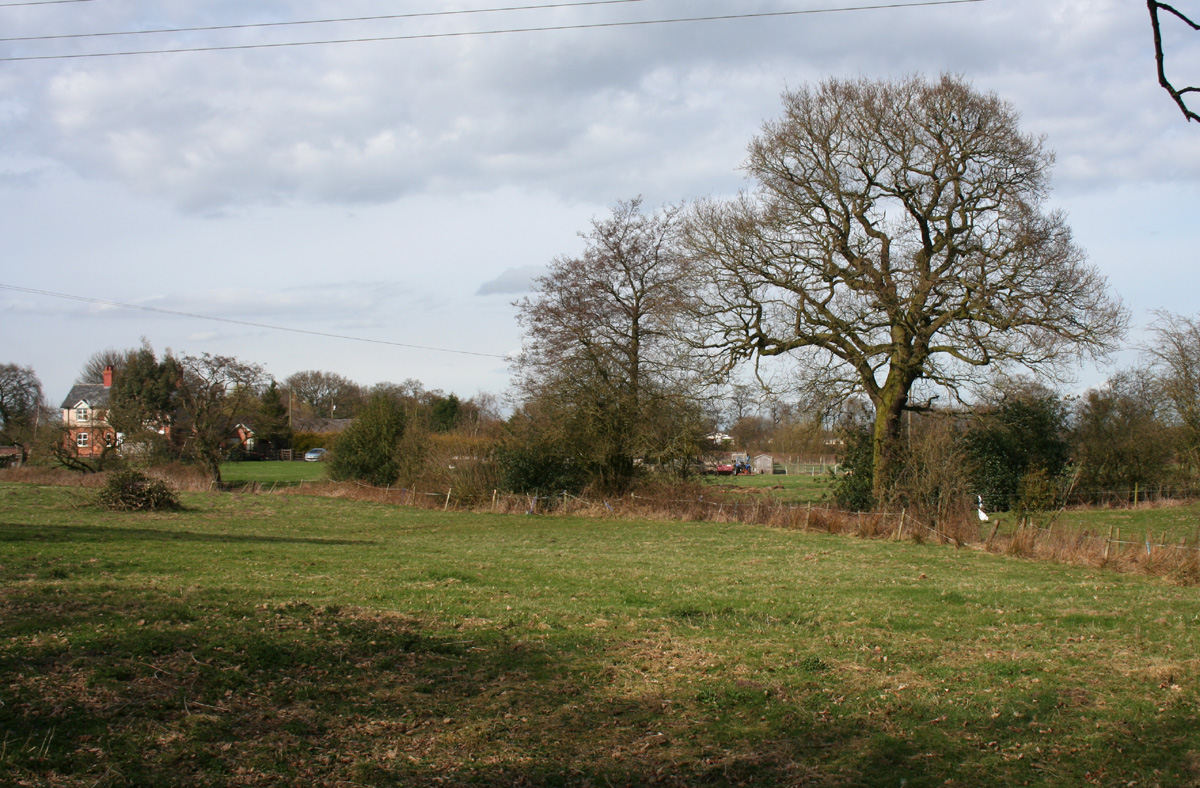
Pasture at Sound

The A530 runs along the south-east edge of the civil parish. Three unclassified roads run from the A530. Wrenbury Heath Road runs westwards towards Wrenbury Heath, where it joins the lane from Nantwich to Wrenbury. Sound Lane initially runs westwards, joining Wrenbury Heath Road at SJ620480, and then turns northwards towards Ravensmoor, where it also joins the lane to Nantwich. Newtown Road connects the A530 and Sound Lane.

The Welsh Marches railway line runs through the parish from the south-west to the north-east, crossing Wrenbury Heath Road at SJ612481 and Sound Lane at SJ619488. Two further railway bridges serve Sound Hall (SJ613483) and Bridge Farm (SJ620489), with no public right of way. The National Cycle Network Regional Route 75 runs westwards from the A530 along Newtown Road and then follows Sound Lane.

== Sound Heath ==
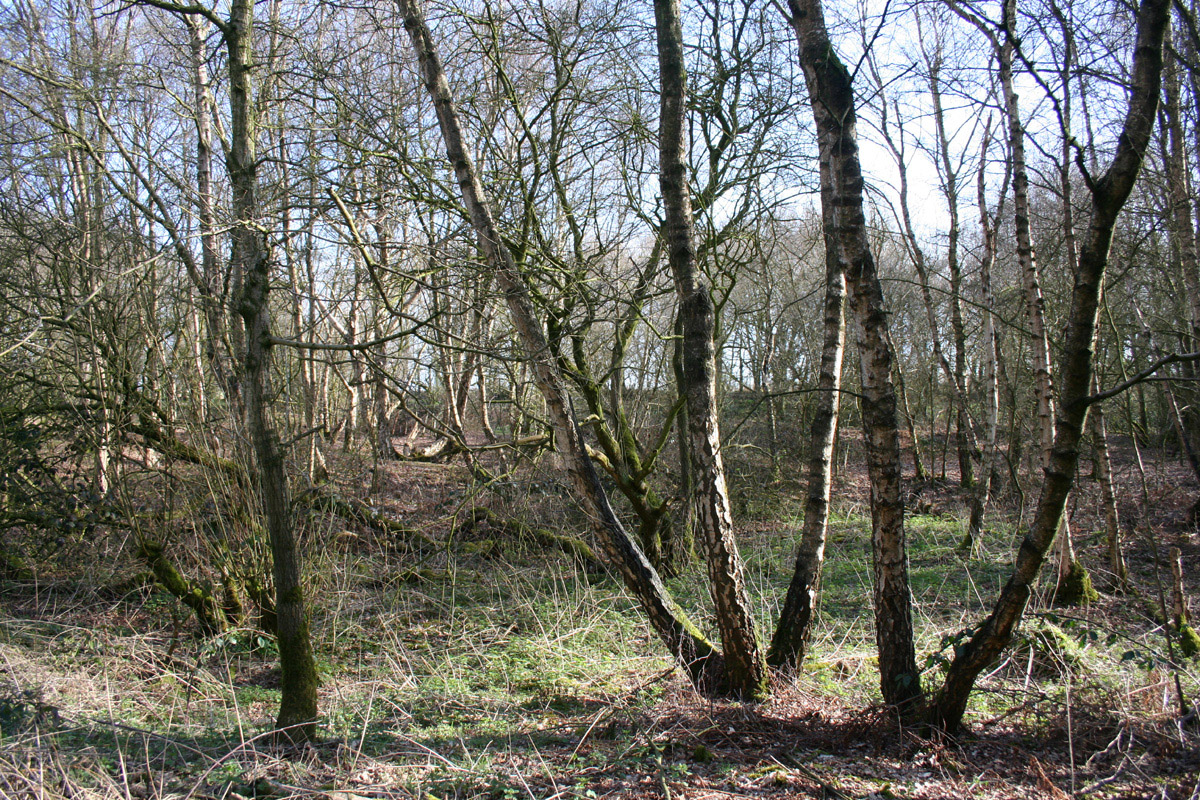
Damp woodland at Sound Heath SSSI

The parish includes the Site of Special Scientific Interest (SSSI) and Local Nature Reserve of Sound Heath, also known as Sound Common. The designated site comprises two distinct areas totalling 4.8 Ha, the larger centred at SJ620479 and the smaller at SJ623481. The habitat is varied, with damp and dry lowland heath, grassland, scrub and young woodland. There are many permanent or seasonal pools, which originate from sand extraction.

Sound Heath is one of the most important sites in Cheshire for freshwater invertebrates. Pond-dwelling species that are rare in the UK which have been observed here include the mud snail, great raft spider and a species of water scavenger beetle. The beautiful snout moth is another nationally scarce species which has been recorded at Sound Heath. The area is also an important breeding site for a wide range of birds.

== Places of worship ==
Broomhall and Sound Methodist Chapel is in Newtown at SJ625479. Founded in 1838 as Broomhall Church, it belonged successively to the Wesleyan Methodist Association, United Methodist Free Churches and United Methodist Church. In 1973, it amalgamated with Sound Heath Chapel. It is a white rendered building with an apse at one end, which was extended in 1980. It belongs to the Audlem section of the Nantwich Circuit.

== Other landmarks ==
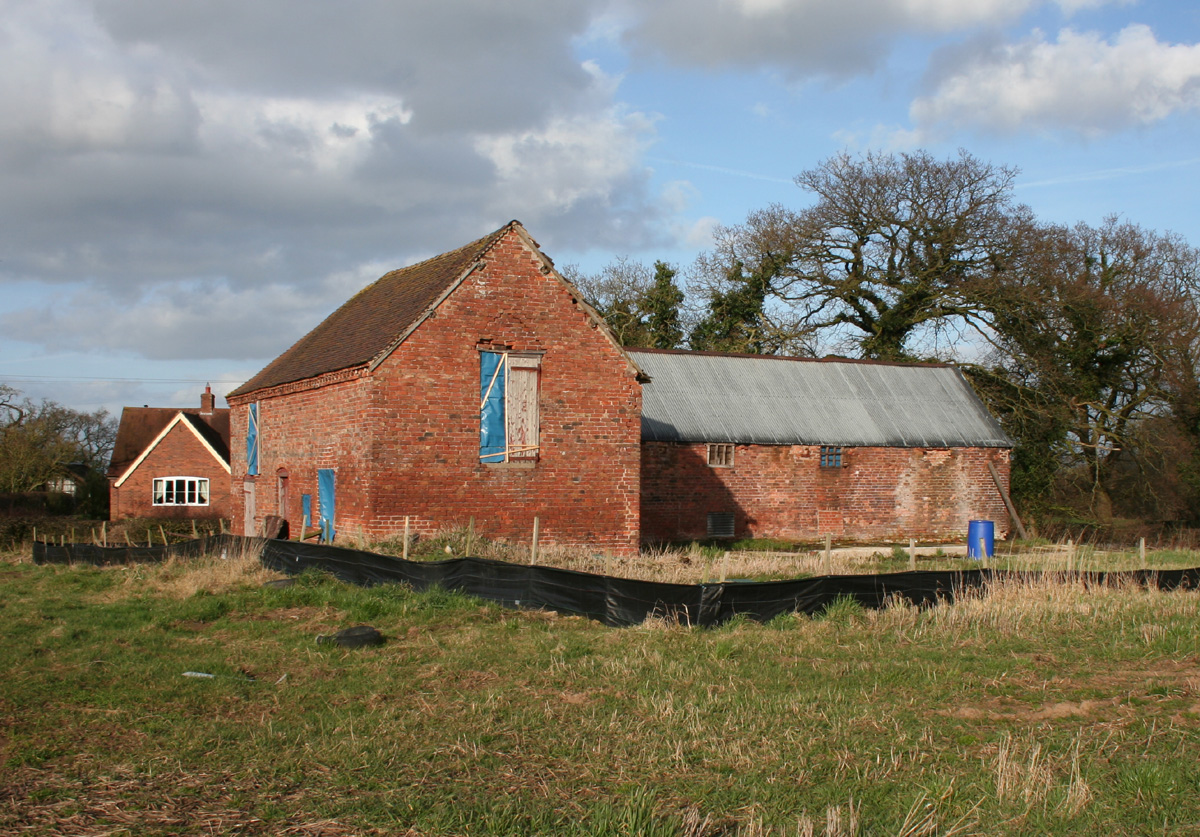
Former malt kiln near Sound Hall

Sound Oak Farmhouse on Sound Lane (SJ617491) dates from the early 17th century and is listed at grade II. The two-storey, timber-framed building is on an H-shaped plan with a tiled roof. The two end bays are gabled and have small jetties. The grade-II-listed Fulhurst Hall, also on Sound Lane (SJ622501), dates originally from the mid-17th century. The two-storey, T-shaped building is partly timber-framed with a 20th-century brick extension and a tiled roof.

A former red-brick malt kiln stands opposite Sound Hall on Wrenbury Heath Road (SJ614481). Such buildings were common in around 1800, but very few examples are still standing. A long low wing forms the former drying area, where malt and hops were dried; six sets of wooden shutters on each of the two floors were used to adjust the airflow. An adjoining wing with a higher roof was used for brewing. The building was substantially unaltered and in use as a barn in 2006, but was being converted into residential use in 2010.

== Demography ==
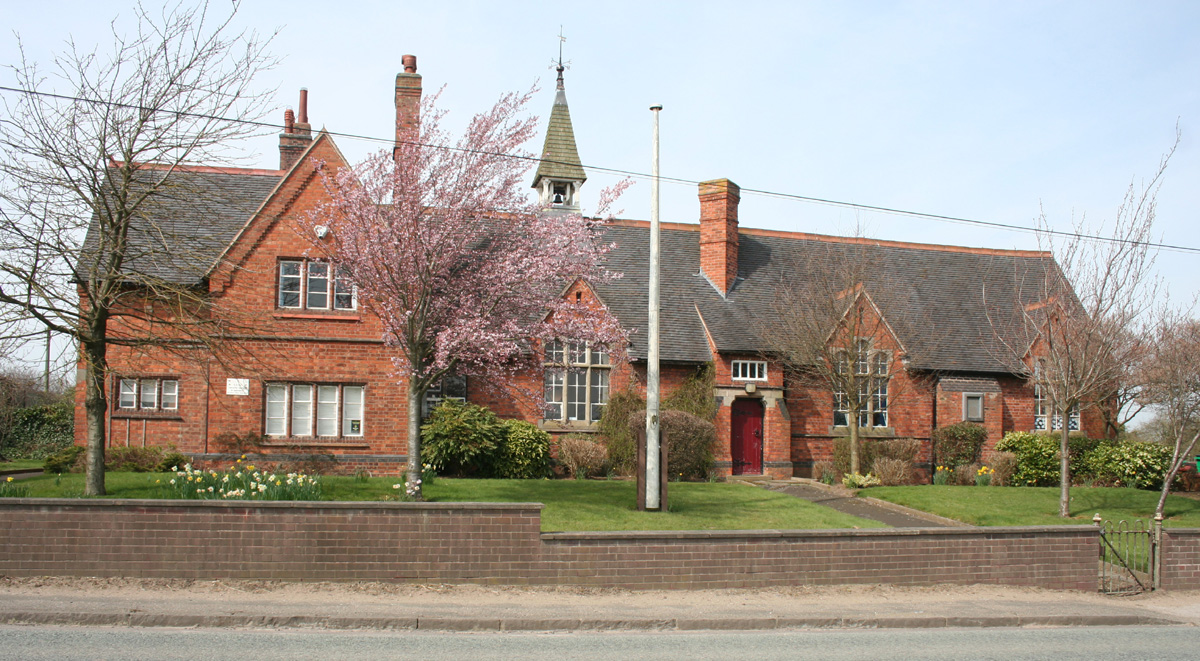
Sound and District Primary School

In 2006, the total population of the civil parish was estimated as 220. The 2001 census recorded a population of 233, in 88 households. The historical population figures were 192 (1801), 261 (1851), 234 (1901) and 237 (1951).

== Education ==
Sound and District Primary School is on the A530 at SJ628482. It serves the civil parish of Sound, as well as Austerson, Baddington, Broomhall, Coole Pilate and Newhall.

The school building dates from 1876 and is listed at grade II. A single-storey building of three bays with a bell turret forms the school, with an adjoining two-storey schoolmaster's house; both are in red and blue brick with a blue tile roof.

The parish falls within the catchment area of Brine Leas High School in Nantwich.

== See also ==
- Listed buildings in Sound, Cheshire
