= Sound Heath =

Area in Sound, Cheshire, England

- Site of Special Scientific Interest
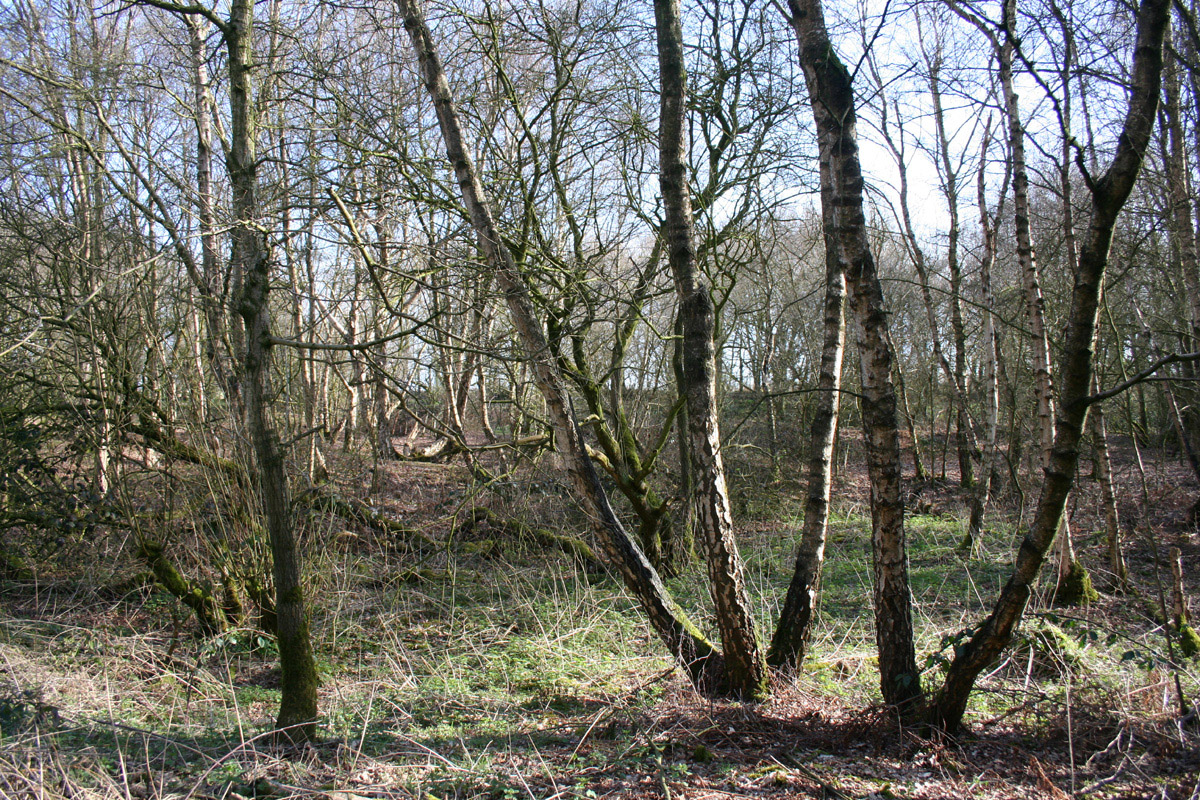
- Damp woodland is a common habitat at Sound Heath

- Location within Cheshire
- Location of Sound Heath.
- Area of search: Cheshire
- Grid reference: SJ620479, SJ623481
- Coordinates: 53.027°N 2.567°W
- Interest: Biological
- Area: 4.8 ha (12 acres)
- Notification date: 1963

Sound Heath, also known as Sound Common, is an area of common land in Sound, near Nantwich in Cheshire, England, which includes heathland, grassland, scrub, woodland and wetland habitats. The majority of the area is designated a Site of Special Scientific Interest and a Local Nature Reserve.

One of the very few lowland heaths in Cheshire, Sound Heath is a valuable habitat for heathland plants and animals, although its heathland character is currently under threat from the spread of trees and scrub. The common's ponds form one of the most important sites in the county for freshwater invertebrates. Three nationally rare or endangered species have been found within the area: the mud snail (which is now one of the UK's most endangered freshwater creatures, having been recently recategorised as near threatened across Europe in the new IUCN European Red List of Non-marine Molluscs), great raft spider and the Enochrus isotae species of water scavenger beetle, as well as the nationally scarce beautiful snout moth. The first sightings of the migrant hawker dragonfly in Cheshire were at Sound Heath, and many other locally rare species have been recorded here. The site is also an important breeding site for birds.

== Geography and geology ==
Sound Heath lies on the Cheshire Plain, 3 miles southwest of Nantwich, at an average elevation of around 65 metres. The underlying geology is Keuper marl (Mercia Mudstone Group), a red sandstone laid down during the Triassic period. Glacial sand deposition has generated a light, sandy soil which is nutrient poor. Localised sand extraction has resulted in numerous pools.

The Site of Special Scientific Interest (SSSI) of Sound Heath was designated in 1963 and occupies 4.80 Ha. The Local Nature Reserve (LNR), which is named Sound Common, was designated in 1992; it is slightly smaller at 4.61 Ha. Both SSSI and LNR include two distinct sites: the larger site (3.84 Ha in the SSSI) lies between Wrenbury Heath Road–Sound Lane and the Red Lion Farm track, and is centred at around SJ620479. A second smaller area (0.96 Ha) lies northeast of the main site, to the north of Wrenbury Heath Road, and is centred at around SJ623481.

The common land includes both SSSI/LNR sites and also extends over a larger region, including three additional areas contiguous with the larger SSSI/LNR site: north of Sound Lane, and in the triangles formed by Sound Lane, Wrenbury Heath Road and Heath View, and Wrenbury Heath Road, the Red Lion Farm track and an unnamed north–south track. It is open access land under the Countryside and Rights of Way Act 2000.

== Habitats ==
Sound Heath contains several diverse habitats: damp and dry heathland, grassland, scrub and young woodland. Numerous permanent or seasonal pools are scattered throughout the area.

=== Heath and grassland ===
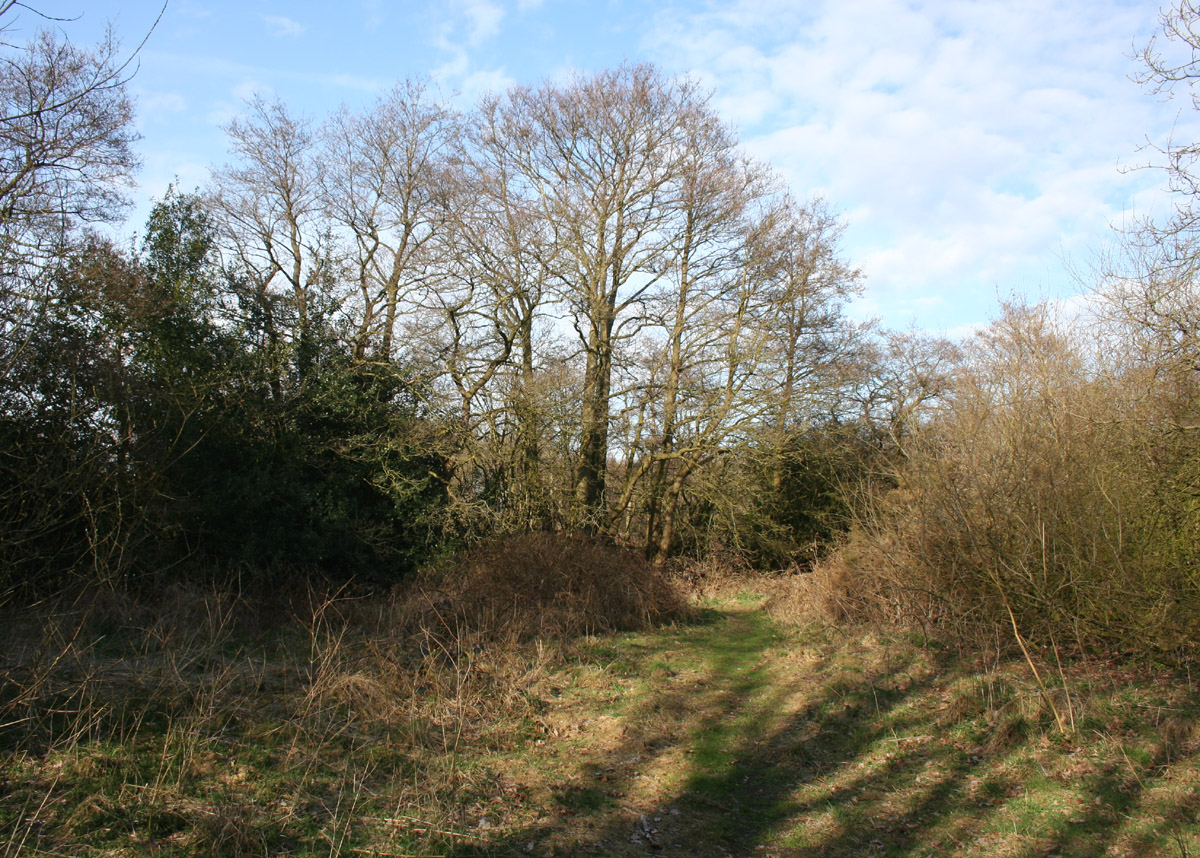
Grassy heathland and scrub

Lowland heath (heathland below 300 metres elevation) is an internationally scarce habitat which is rare within Cheshire. A survey in 1995 found only 60 Ha in the administrative county, of which as little as 11 Ha were wet heath. Sound Heath is one of only four lowland heath SSSIs in the county.

In the areas of damp heath, the predominant species when the site was designated an SSSI in 1963 were common heather (Calluna vulgaris), cross-leaved heath (Erica tetralix), common gorse (Ulex europaeus), western gorse (U. gallii) and purple moor grass (Molinia caerulea). These areas also of bog moss (Sphagnum). A total of 50 species of bryophytes have been recorded at the site, including the large white-moss (Leucobryum glaucum), which is rare in Cheshire. Other locally rare species that have been observed here include bog asphodel (Narthecium ossifragum), common lousewort (Pedicularis sylvatica) and round-leaved sundew (Drosera rotundifolia).

The drier areas of heath have a grassy character, with typical species being matgrass (Nardus stricta) and wavy hair-grass (Deschampsia flexuosa). Common tormentil (Potentilla erecta), dovesfoot cranesbill (Geranium molle), heath bedstraw (Galium saxatile), heath milkwort (Polygala serpyllifolia) and heath rush (Juncus squarrosus) have also been recorded, as has the locally rare bird's-foot (Ornithopus perpusillus) and shepherd's cress (Teesdalia nudicaulis).

During the late 20th century, the area of heathland has been substantially reduced by the encroachment of scrub, birch, alder and willow. The incursion of trees has caused the heath to become drier, resulting in the loss of some wet heath plants, including bog asphodel and round-leaved sundew.

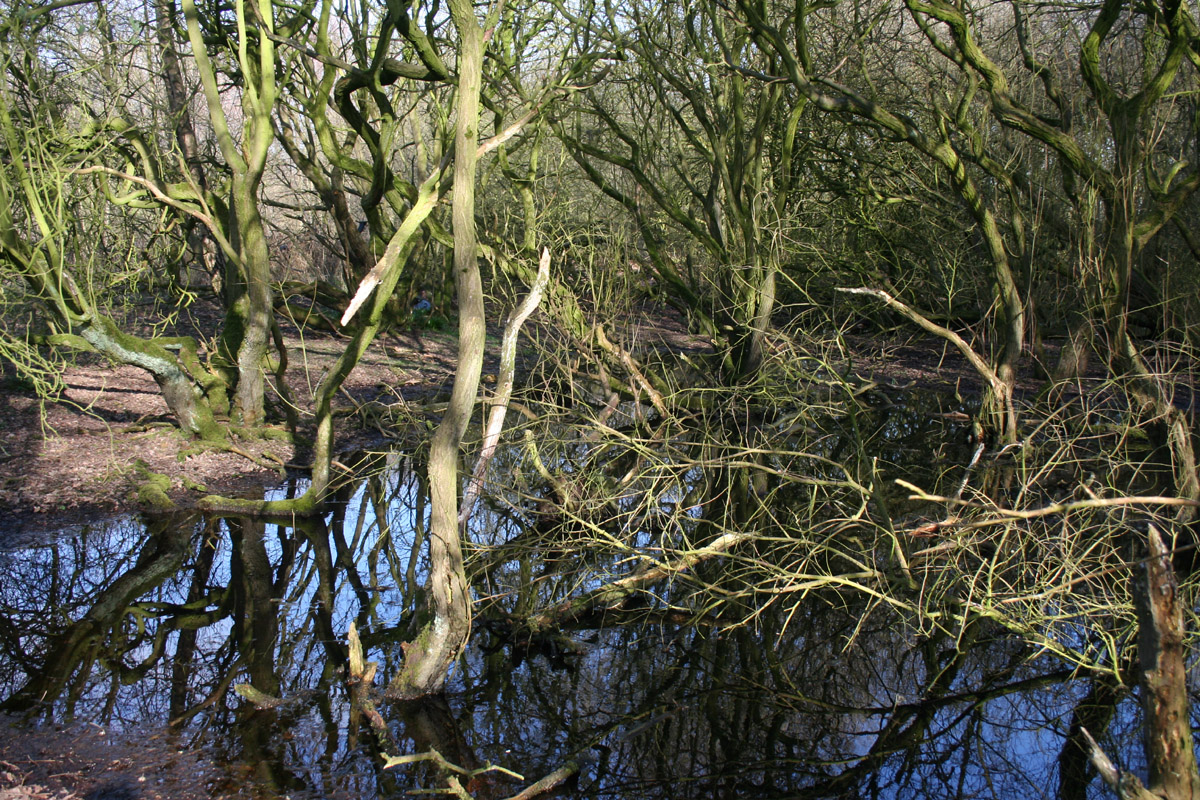
One of many small woodland ponds

=== Wetland ===
The wetland habitat at Sound Heath is very diverse, ranging from small ponds and damp hollows to Sound Pond (SJ619480), which is nearly 60 metres in length. Water bodies are found both in the sunny open heath areas and within the woodland. As the pools result from the extraction of sand, they have a different ecology from the more common marl-pits, as well as from the glacial kettle holes and salt-subsidence flashes of the Cheshire Plain. Most have reached the late succession (mature) stage. Although the encroachment of trees on the common has led to some ponds becoming infilled with leaf debris, reducing the number of permanent pools, the resultant seasonal wet areas support several rare plant species.

The pools provide a habitat for a wide range of emergent plants, of which the rarest is bog St John's-wort (Hypericum elodes), previously believed to have died out in Cheshire. The locally rare floating club rush (Eleogiton fluitans) has been recorded at the site. Other wetland species observed here include bogbean (Menyanthes trifoliata), garlic mustard (Alliaria petiolata), greater spearwort (Ranunculus lingua), lesser celandine (Ranunculus ficaria), marsh cinquefoil (Potentilla palustris), marsh marigold (Caltha palustris), marsh pennywort (Hydrocotyle vulgaris), marsh thistle (Cirsium palustre), marsh violet (Viola palustris), reedmace (Typha), water violet (Hottonia palustris) and wavy bittercress (Cardamine flexuosa).

=== Scrub and woodland ===
The woodland predominantly dates from the past 40 years, although there are some mature oaks and other trees. The main species are common alder (Alnus glutinosa), pedunculate oak (Quercus robur), silver birch (Betula pendula) and willow (Salix), with common bramble (Rubus fruticosus) predominant in the undergrowth.

== Fauna ==
=== Invertebrates ===
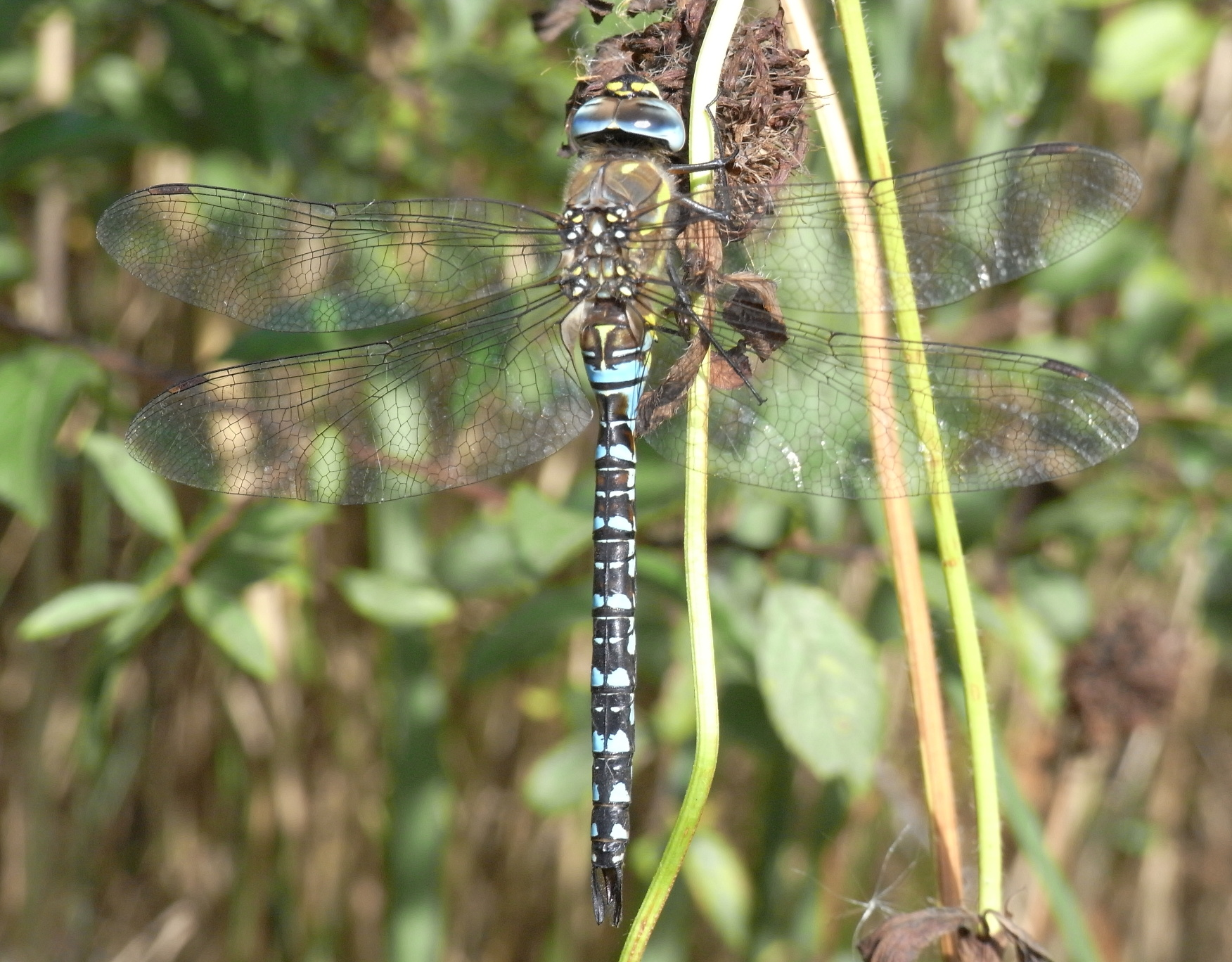
Migrant hawker dragonfly

The mature pools of Sound Heath form one of the most important sites in Cheshire for freshwater invertebrates. The mud snail (Omphiscola glabra), Enochrus isotae species of water scavenger beetle and the great raft spider (Dolomedes plantarius), which are rare or endangered in the UK, are among the many species that have been recorded in the site's ponds. Locally rare pond dwellers include the caseless caddisfly (Holocentropus stagnalis) and the diving beetle (Hygrotus decoratus).

Dragonflies and damselflies are common, with 15 species recorded, two-thirds of which are known to breed here. Species include the broad-bodied chaser (Libellula depressa), common hawker (Aeshna juncea), emperor (Anax imperator) and ruddy darter (Sympetrum sanguineum), as well as the first Cheshire sighting of the migrant hawker (Aeshna mixta).

The beautiful snout moth (Hypena crassalis), a scarce moth species in the UK, has been recorded at the site. The open heath and grassland no longer forms a breeding site for the small heath butterfly (Coenonympha pamphilus), whose numbers are declining in the UK.

Sixty species of spider have been recorded at the site.

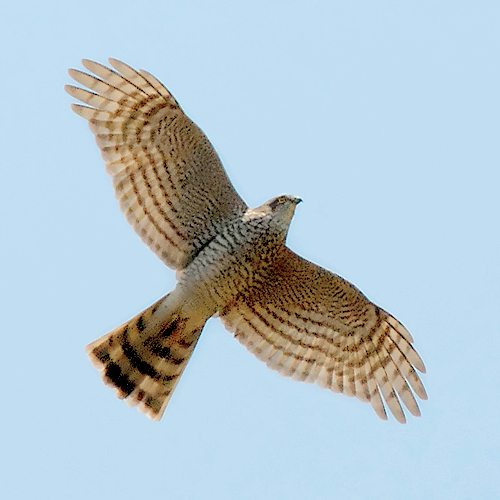
Sparrowhawk

=== Birds ===
Sound Heath forms an important breeding site for a wide range of birds. Locally rare species include the Eurasian sparrowhawk (Accipiter nisus) and the willow tit (Parus montanus). Among the other species that have been observed here are the moorhen, reed bunting, turtle dove and willow warbler, the tawny, little and barn owls, and the greater spotted, lesser spotted and green woodpeckers.

=== Other animals ===
The heathland is a significant local habitat for the common lizard (Zootoca vivipara) grass snakes (Natrix natrix), and slowworms (Anguis fragilis) dominate the mats in the grassland in spring-time. The common newt (Lissotriton vulgaris), common toad (Bufo bufo) and common frog (Rana temporaria) all inhabit the ponds, and the high insect numbers associated with the water attract bats, such as the common pipistrelle (Pipistrellus pipistrellus) and common long-eared bat (Plecotus auritus).

== Management and current status ==
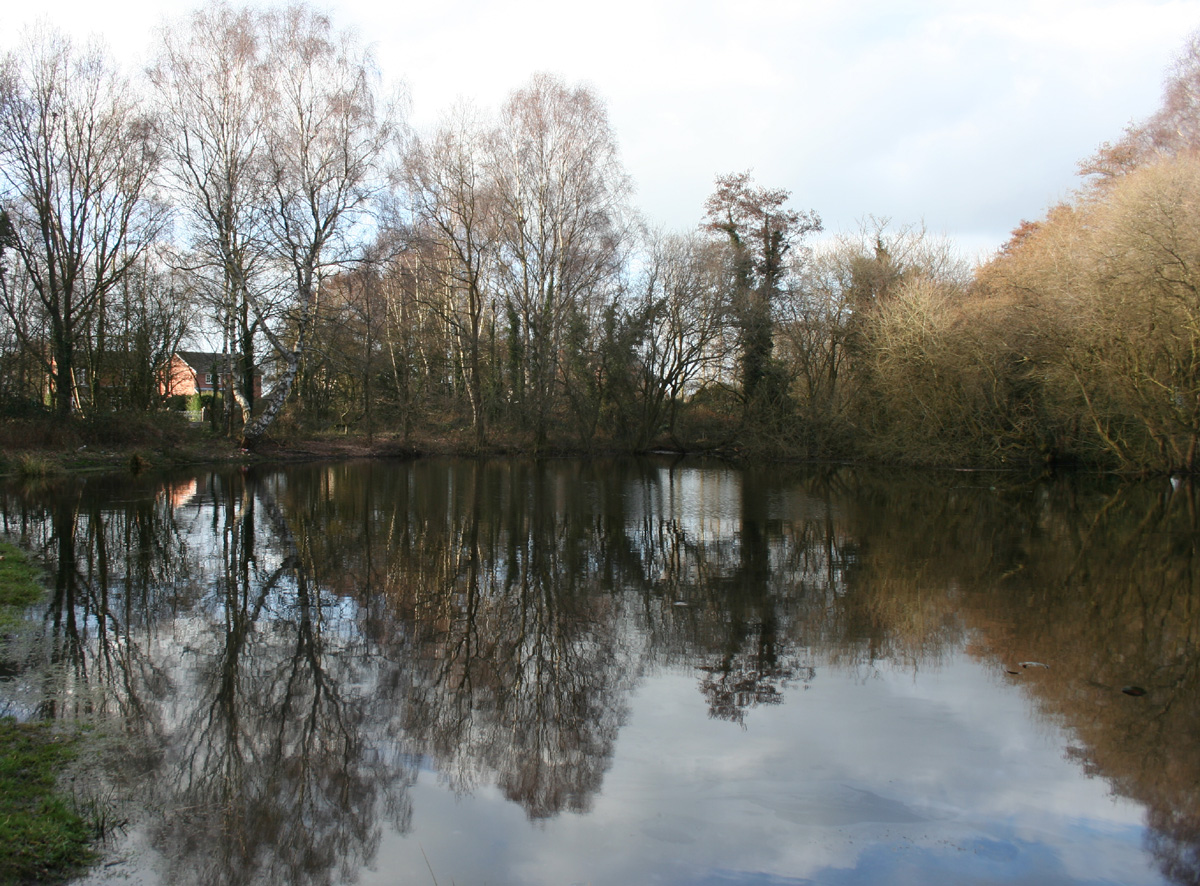
Sound Pond is threatened by growth of New Zealand pondweed, as well as illegal fishing and camping

Sound Heath is managed by the Cheshire Countryside Management Service and volunteers from the Sound and District Residents Association (SADRA), which was founded in November 2000 to carry out conservation work at the common. The landowner is Cheshire East unitary authority (formerly Crewe and Nantwich Borough Council). Management includes scrub and bramble clearance, removal of saplings, gorse thinning, removal of New Zealand pondweed from Sound Pond, maintenance of footpaths and footbridges, and removal of rubbish. Heather seeds from the Little Budworth Common SSSI were planted in 2003.

Although in 2002/3 English Nature recommended removing mature trees from the edges of open areas to encourage heath regeneration, SADRA considers Sound Heath to be "not just a Heathland, but a 'Mosaic' site where no one part should be extended at the expense of another without good grounds for doing so." The association's approach to tree removal has therefore been cautious, with progressive tree felling being undertaken only where beneficial effects to the site have been observed.

The site was assessed by Natural England as in an unfavourable but stable condition in 2008, due to a reduction in heath-associated plants caused by the growth of trees and scrub. Other threats to the area include fly-tipping, algal bloom in the ponds, and fishing, camping and lighting fires around Sound Pond.

Facilities for visitors include a car park on Sound Lane (SJ623479) and an interpretive sign about the common's ponds (SJ619479). Buses serving Sound Heath run on weekdays and Saturdays operating to/from Wrenbury, Nantwich and Leighton Hospital.

== See also ==
- List of Sites of Special Scientific Interest in Cheshire
