= Baddington =

Civil parish in Cheshire, England

Coordinates: 53.043°N 2.541°W

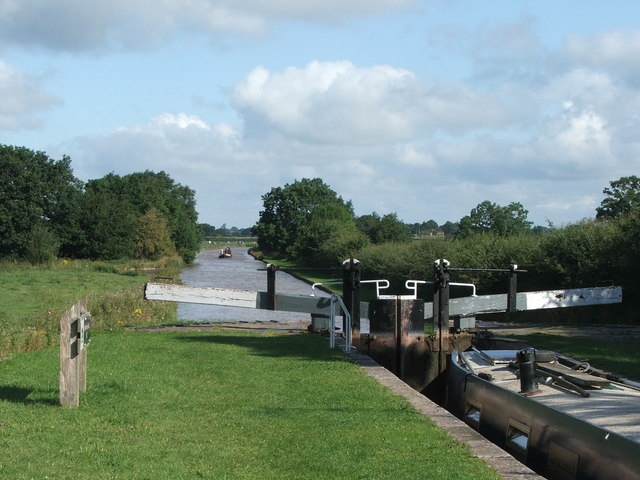
- One of the Hack Green Locks on the Shropshire Union Canal

- Location within Cheshire
- Population: 212 (2011)
- OS grid reference: SJ637496
- Civil parish: Baddington
- Unitary authority: Cheshire East
- Ceremonial county: Cheshire
- Region: North West
- Country: England
- Sovereign state: United Kingdom
- Post town: NANTWICH
- Postcode district: CW5
- Dialling code: 01270
- Police: Cheshire
- Fire: Cheshire
- Ambulance: North West
- UK Parliament: Chester South and Eddisbury

Baddington is a civil parish in the unitary authority of Cheshire East and the ceremonial county of Cheshire, England, which lies immediately to the south-west of Nantwich and north of Audlem. Predominantly rural with scattered farms, the civil parish has a total population of around 100 people, increasing to 212 at the 2011 Census, and includes the dispersed settlement of Hack Green, the site of a former RAF decoy station, radar station and Home Defence regional headquarters. Nearby villages include Aston, Broomhall Green, Hankelow, Ravensmoor, Sound Heath and Stapeley.

== History ==
The name Baddington is of Saxon origin, and means "Beada's Farm". It is not mentioned by name in the Domesday survey, the first record being in the period 1175–84. The civil parish fell within the ancient parish of Acton in the Nantwich Hundred; it was served by St Mary's Church, Acton. In the reign of Edward III (1327–77), the land was acquired by the Bromley family, who had their seat at Baddington Hall. A famous member of that family was Sir John Bromley, who served in the wars in France and, according to Hall's History of Nantwich, "heroically recovered the British Standard at Corbie" in 1415, just before the Battle of Agincourt. He was buried at Acton in 1419. In the 16th century, the Fouleshurst family were also landowners in the parish. Later the land passed to the Lords Kilmorley, the owner in 1800, who was a major landowner in this part of Cheshire. A gazetteer entry of 1870–2 mentions twenty houses, with a total property value of £1,715. In 1936, a small area of the civil parish was transferred to Nantwich.

Part of Baddington and the adjacent parish of Austerson was forest until at least the mid-17th century, with wood being used as fuel for salt production in nearby Nantwich. Salt might also have been produced within the parish, as a brine spring is shown on an 1831 map of the area. The parish formerly had a small water-powered mill and a brick kiln field. Agriculture was the major land use by the early 19th century.

The road between Nantwich and Edleston crossed the parish; in 1607, the right of way was 12 feet wide. Transport connections improved in the 19th century with the construction first of the Birmingham and Liverpool Junction Canal, now part of the Shropshire Union (1835), and then the now-dismantled Nantwich and Market Drayton Railway (1863).

== Governance ==
Since 1950, Baddington has been administered by Sound and District Parish Council. From 1974 the civil parish was served by Crewe and Nantwich Borough Council, which was succeeded on 1 April 2009 by the unitary authority of Cheshire East. Baddington falls in the parliamentary constituency of Chester South and Eddisbury, which has been represented since the 2024 general election by Aphra Brandreth of the Conservative Party. It was previously part of the Eddisbury constituency, which since its establishment in 1983 had been held by the Conservative MPs Alastair Goodlad (1983–99), Stephen O'Brien (1999–2015), Antoinette Sandbach (2015–19) and Edward Timpson (2019–24).

== Geography and transport ==
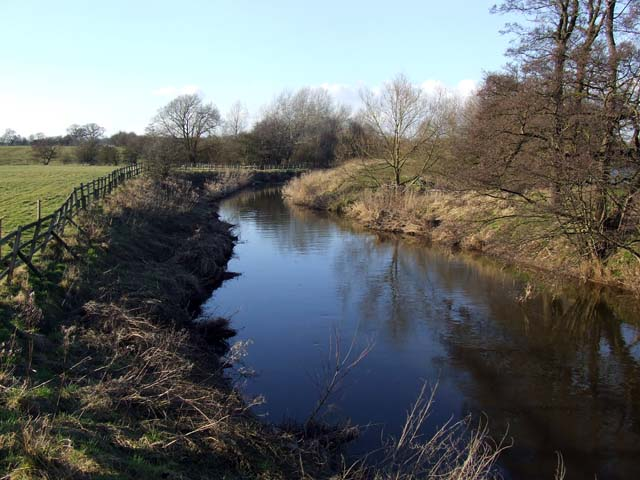
River Weaver in Baddington

The civil parish has a total area of 1,439 acres (582 ha). The area is relatively flat, with an average elevation of around 50 metres. The Shropshire Union Canal runs broadly north–south through the parish. The Baddington section of the canal contains the two Hackgreen Locks as well as two cast-iron canal mile posts; all date from around 1826 and are listed at grade II. It is also crossed by two road bridges, Baddington Lane Bridge (A530) and Burrow's Bridge (French Lane), as well as Hack Green footbridge; all three canal bridges are listed at grade II.

A short stretch of the River Weaver near Nantwich Lake runs through the northern tip of the parish, and Shrew Bridge (A530) lies on the parish boundary. Several small meres and ponds are scattered across the farmland. There are two small woods, Broomhall Gorse and Gorse Covert, which lie to the west of the canal, as well as other smaller areas of unnamed woodland.

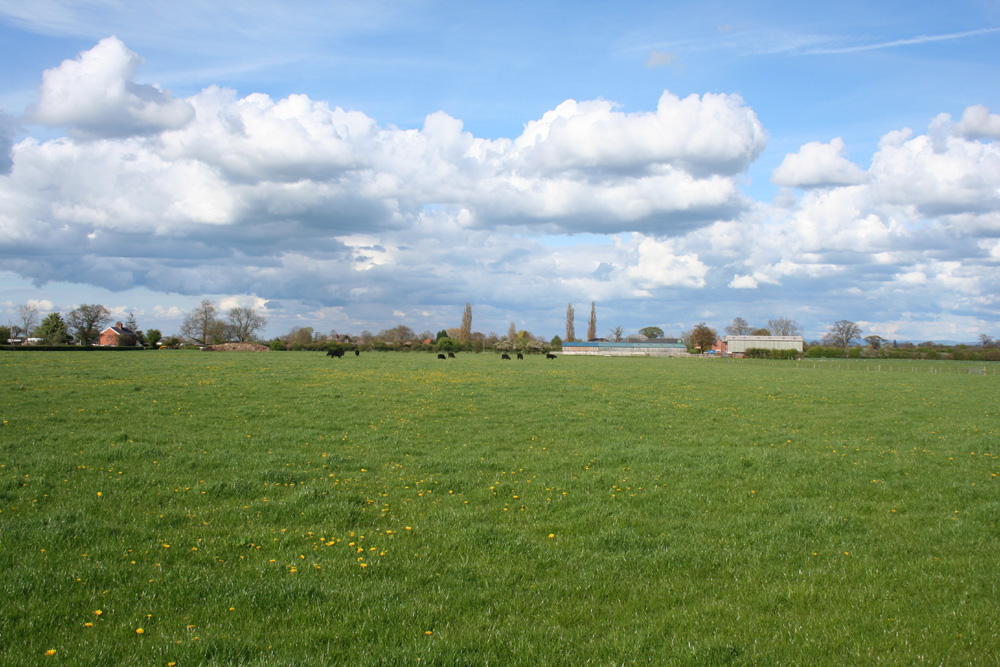
Pasture near Hack Green

The A530 (known successively as Whitchurch Road, Baddington Lane and Shrewbridge Road) runs through the parish from the south west to the north-east. Coole Lane runs north–south, joining the A530 at the north of the parish; French Lane/French Lane End runs east–west. The Welsh Marches Railway runs immediately to the north-west of the parish, being less than 50 metres beyond the boundary at the closest point. The Crewe and Nantwich Circular Walk crosses the northern tip of the parish.

== Demography ==
In 2006, the total population of the civil parish was estimated as 100. The 2001 census recorded a population of 98, in 38 households. Historical population figures were 121 (1801), 155 (1851), 123 (1901) and 132 (1951).

== Hack Green ==
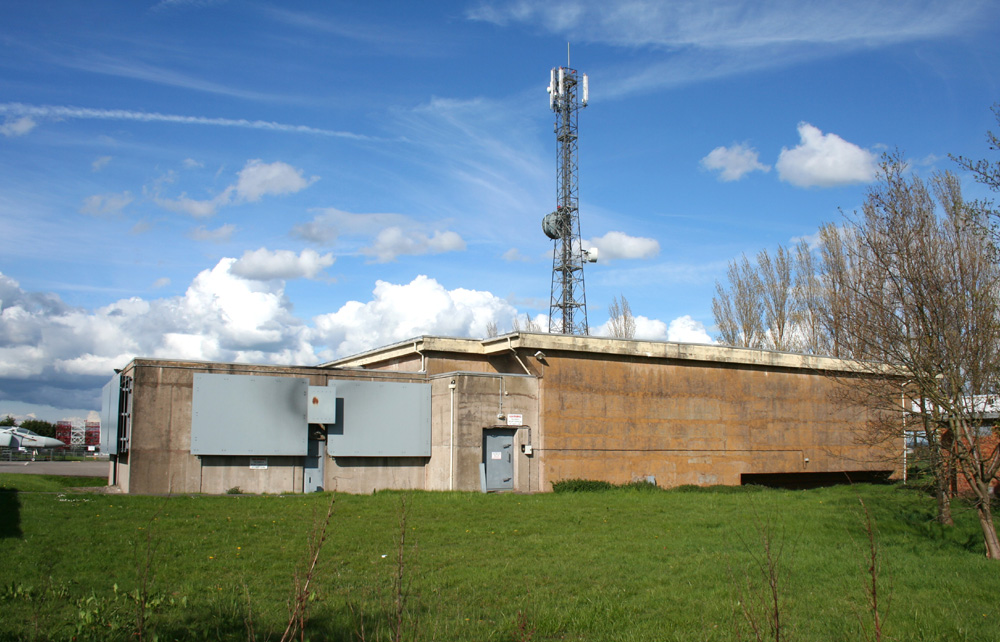
Hack Green Secret Nuclear Bunker

During the Second World War, Hack Green was at first used as a decoy for Crewe railway junction. In 1941, an RAF camp was established there, with a fixed ground-controlled intercept radar station, one of a network of twenty-one across the country. After the war, the site was equipped with a partially underground bunker protecting an air-defence radar installation, part of the ROTOR network. Between 1958 and 1966, Hack Green served as a joint civil and military air traffic control site. In 1976–84, the abandoned RAF site was converted into a nuclear bunker complex, which was the Home Defence regional headquarters for a large area of the North West until 1993.

The site, now known as "Hack Green Secret Nuclear Bunker" (SJ645478), became a museum in 1998. In addition to the Hack Green installations, the museum houses Ballistic Missile Early Warning System equipment from RAF High Wycombe, as well as decommissioned nuclear weapons from various sites.

== Other landmarks ==
Hack House on French Lane (SJ643480) is a timber-framed farmhouse with brick infill, featuring small framing. Dating originally from the early 17th century, it is listed at grade II*. Also on French Lane is the grade-II-listed Hack House Farm House (SJ649486), a roughcast brick farmhouse dating originally from the early 17th century. Baddington Bank Farm on Baddington Lane (SJ639497) is an L-shaped red-brick farmhouse dating from the late 17th century, and is also listed at grade II. Other landmarks within the civil parish include a dry moated site.

== Education ==
There are no educational facilities within the civil parish. Baddington falls within the catchment areas of Sound and District Primary School in Sound and Brine Leas High School in Nantwich.

== See also ==
- Listed buildings in Baddington
