= Listed buildings in Broomhall =

Broomhall is a civil parish in Cheshire East, England. It contains five buildings that are recorded in the National Heritage List for England as designated listed buildings, all of which are at Grade II. This grade is the lowest of the three gradings given to listed buildings and is applied to "buildings of national importance and special interest". The parish is entirely rural, and three of the listed buildings are farmhouses. The Shropshire Union Canal passes through the northeast part of the parish. Two structures associated with the canal are listed, a bridge and a milepost.

Name and location	Photograph	Date	Notes
Top of the Town; 53.01256°N 2.54984°W	—	Early 17th century	A farmhouse that was altered in the 19th century. It is partly timber-framed and partly in roughcast brick. The roof is tiled. The farmhouse is in two storeys with an attic, and has a cross-wing plan. The front is in four bays, the end bays projecting and gabled. The porch has a pitched roof with shaped bargeboards. The windows are casements.
Heatley; 53.01234°N 2.55323°W	—	c. 1750	This is a brick farmhouse with a slate roof, and is in two storeys with an attic. There are two wings, giving it an L-shaped plan. The main wing has a front of three bays, and the side wing is gabled with two bays. The projecting brick porch has shaped bargeboards and a finial. The windows are casements.
The Coronerage; 53.01814°N 2.55690°W	—	Early 19th century	A brick farmhouse, partly roughcast on a rendered plinth, with a tiled roof. At the rear is a 20th-century brick extension. The original part is in two storeys with an attic, and has a three-bay front. In the centre of this is a gabled porch with French windows; the gable has shaped bargeboards and a finial. Flanking the porch are canted bay windows, and the windows elsewhere are casements.
Milepost; 53.01849°N 2.52797°W	—	Early 19th century	The milepost stands by the towpath of the Shropshire Union Canal. It is in cast iron, it consists of a circular post with a domed top, and it carries a cambered plate with three panels. The panels are inscribed with the distances in miles to Nantwich, Autherley Junction, and Norbury Junction.
Mickley Bridge; 53.02036°N 2.52943°W		c. 1826	This is bridge number 84 crossing the Shropshire Union Canal, and is an accommodation bridge. The consultant for the canal was Thomas Telford. The bridge is built in brick and stone, and consists of a single elliptical arch. The carriageway is humped, and there are curved approach walls that end in piers with rounded caps. Inside the bridge are cast iron angle rubbing posts.

== See also ==
- Listed buildings in Sound
- Listed buildings in Baddington
- Listed buildings in Newhall
