= Broomhall, Cheshire =

Civil parish in Cheshire East, England

Coordinates: 53.024°N 2.558°W

Broomhall
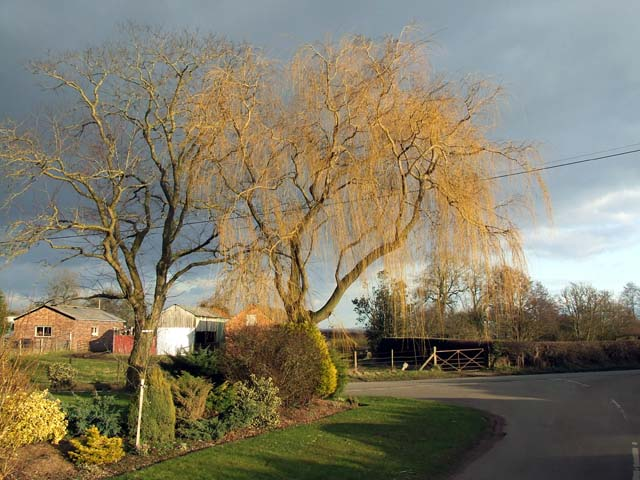
- A530 junction in Broomhall Green

- Location within Cheshire
- Population: 204 (2011)
- OS grid reference: SJ625475
- Civil parish: Broomhall
- Unitary authority: Cheshire East
- Ceremonial county: Cheshire
- Region: North West
- Country: England
- Sovereign state: United Kingdom
- Post town: NANTWICH
- Postcode district: CW5
- Dialling code: 01270
- Police: Cheshire
- Fire: Cheshire
- Ambulance: North West
- UK Parliament: Chester South and Eddisbury

Broomhall is a civil parish in the unitary authority of Cheshire East and the ceremonial county of Cheshire, England. The main line of the Shropshire Union Canal runs through the parish and the River Weaver forms part of its boundary. The main settlement is the hamlet of Broomhall Green, which lies on the A530 about 3.5 miles (5.6 km) south-west of Nantwich. The civil parish has an area of 539 hectares (1,330 acres), and also includes part of the small settlement of Sandford (also in Newhall parish), with a total population of around 200 in 2011. Nearby villages include Aston, Sound, Wrenbury and Audlem. Broomhall appears in the Domesday survey and the name was also historically spelled Bromhall.

== History ==
Brunhala was a small manor at the time of the Domesday survey in 1086. It was held by William Malbank, Baron of Wich Malbank (Nantwich). Before the Norman Conquest it had been held by two men named Edric. A single household was recorded, with a ploughland and a small wood.

In P. P. Burdett's map of 1777, Bromhall was located around the junction of Heatley Lane with Mickley Hall Lane; other settlements marked within the parish are Stanford Bridge (now Sandford Bridge) and Mickley (now Mickley Hall). Broomhall Church, a Wesleyan Methodist chapel, was constructed in 1838, and Broomhall School opened in 1876; both now fall within the modern parish of Sound. In the 1881 census, more than two-thirds of men worked in agriculture; most of the remainder were engaged in the manufacture of or trade in minerals, carriages, harnesses and other goods. A brick field in the south east of the parish is marked on a 1945 map.

== Governance ==
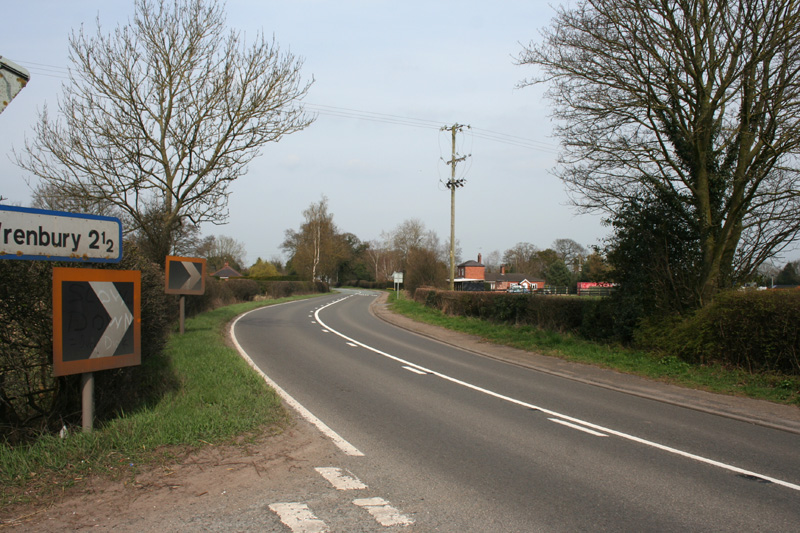
A530 near Broomhall Green

The civil parish is administered by Sound & District Parish Council, jointly with the nearby civil parishes of Austerson, Baddiley, Baddington, Coole Pilate and Sound, with three councillors representing Broomhall out of a total of fourteen. From 1974 the civil parish was served by Crewe and Nantwich Borough Council, which was succeeded on 1 April 2009 by the new unitary authority of Cheshire East. Broomhall falls in the parliamentary constituency of Chester South and Eddisbury, which has been represented since the 2024 general election by Aphra Brandreth of the Conservative Party. It was previously part of the Eddisbury constituency, which since its establishment in 1983 had been held by the Conservative MPs Alastair Goodlad (1983–99), Stephen O'Brien (1999–2015), Antoinette Sandbach (2015–19) and Edward Timpson (2019–24).

== Geography and transport ==
The civil parish has an area of 538.62 hectares (1,331 acres). The area is largely agricultural with farms including Meadow Farm, New Farm, Coronerage, Pritch Farm, Lane Farm, Lynn Easton Farm, Seven Oaks Farm and Oak Farm. The River Weaver forms the western boundary of the parish and the A530 (Whitchurch Road) forms its north-west boundary. The main line of the Shropshire Union Canal runs north-west to south-east through the north-eastern corner. The terrain is relatively flat, with an average elevation of around 60 metres (200 ft). The land slopes gently from the A530, with a high point of 68 metres (223 ft) at the junction with the lane to Sound Heath, down to the canal at 54 metres (177 ft). A trig point at 62 metres (203 ft) is located just west of Mickley Hall. Finnaker Brook has its source in the parish, and there are multiple unnamed drains, as well as many small meres or ponds scattered across the area. There are several small patches of woodland, including Broomhall Wood and Devil's Nest on Finnaker Brook.

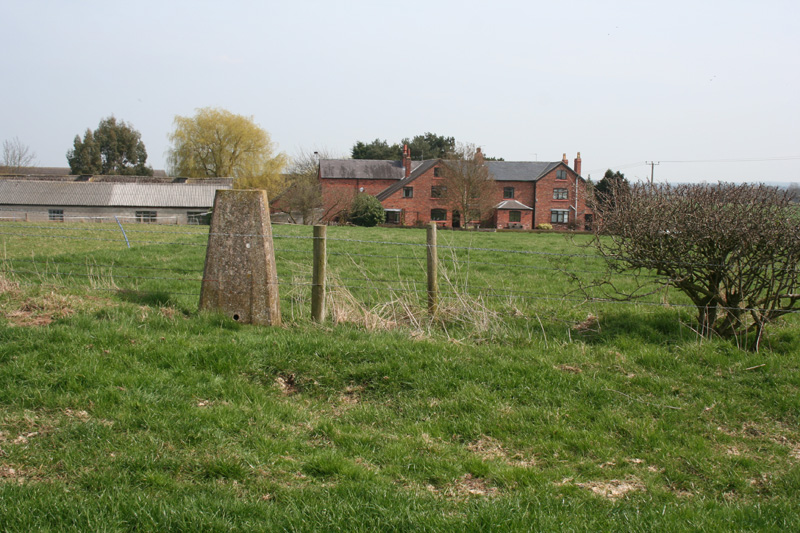
Trig point near Mickley Hall

Heatley Lane runs from the A530 near Sound southwards into the parish of Newhall, where it becomes Hollingreen Lane and connects with Coole Lane, which runs north–south to the east of the parish. Mickley Hall Lane/French Lane runs eastwards from Heatley Lane in the north of the parish to Hack Green in Baddington parish, where it also connects with Coole Lane. Cock Lane and Slaughterhouse Lane each run westwards from Heatley Lane to the A530. Broomhall Green is centred at the junction of Slaughterhouse Lane and the A530, and there is also settlement along Cock Lane and along Heatley Lane north of the junction with Cock Lane. The South Cheshire Way long-distance footpath runs east–west through the parish.

== Demography ==
According to the 2001 census, the civil parish had a population of 206, remaining steady at 204 in 79 households at the 2011 census. This is an increase from the population of the 19th and early 20th centuries, but a decline from the 1951 peak; the historical population figures are 140 (1801), 142 (1851), 127 (1881), 114 (1901), 184 (1931) and 243 (1951).

== Landmarks ==
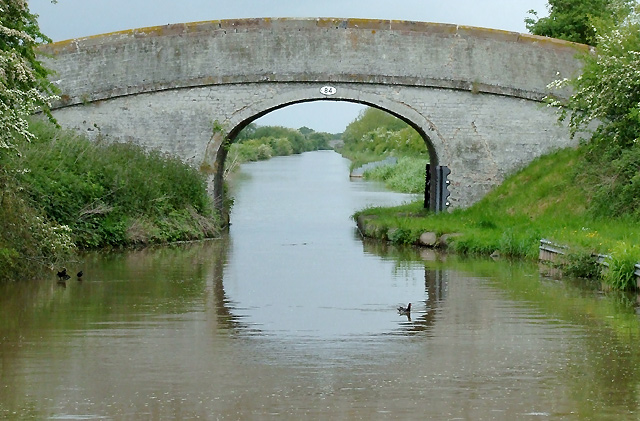
Mickley Bridge over the Shropshire Union

Several buildings within the parish are listed at grade II, the lowest of the three grades. The oldest listed building is Top of the Town, off Heatley Lane, a farmhouse dating originally from the early 17th century. It has projecting end bays and a tiled roof, and is part roughcast over brick and part timber framed, featuring some close studding with a middle rail. Two farmhouses on Heatley Lane are listed: Heatley is an L-shaped, red-brick building with a slate roof, dating from around 1750, and The Coronerage is a roughcast brick building with a tiled roof, dating originally from the early 19th century. Each has a front porch with decorative barge boards, topped with a finial. Mickley Bridge is a blue-brick-and-stone accommodation bridge over the Shropshire Union Canal, dating from around 1826, and a nearby cast-iron canal milepost is also listed. Additionally, the remains of a moat are visible south east of Mickley Hall.

== Education ==
There are no educational facilities in modern Broomhall. The civil parish falls within the catchment areas of Brine Leas School in Nantwich, and Sound and District Primary School.

== See also ==
- Listed buildings in Broomhall
