= Austerson =

Civil parish in Cheshire, England

Coordinates: 53.038°N 2.516°W

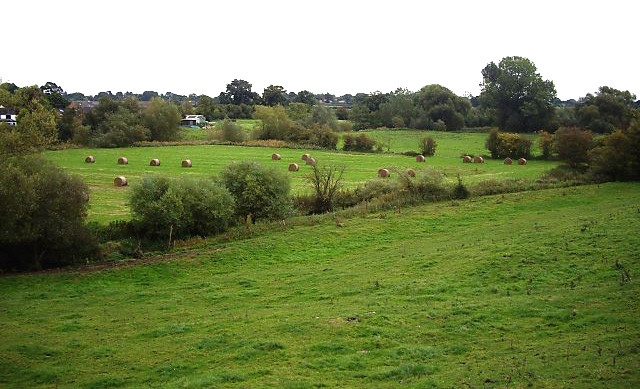
- Fields by the River Weaver in the east of the civil parish

- Location within Cheshire
- Population: 194 (Including Coole Pilate. 2011)
- OS grid reference: SJ564491
- Civil parish: Sound and District
- Unitary authority: Cheshire East
- Ceremonial county: Cheshire
- Region: North West
- Country: England
- Sovereign state: United Kingdom
- Post town: NANTWICH
- Postcode district: CW5
- Dialling code: 01270
- Police: Cheshire
- Fire: Cheshire
- Ambulance: North West
- UK Parliament: Chester South and Eddisbury

Austerson is a civil parish in the unitary authority of Cheshire East and the ceremonial county of Cheshire, England, lying immediately south of the town of Nantwich and north of the village of Audlem. Predominantly rural with scattered farms, the civil parish includes the small settlement of Old Hall Austerson at SJ656493, about two miles south of Nantwich centre. In 2001, the total population was a little under 150, increasing to 194 at the 2011 Census. Nearby villages include Broomhall Green, Hack Green, Hankelow, Sound Heath and Stapeley.

== History ==
Austerson derives from the Saxon Essetune, meaning "Aelfstan's Farm". The civil parish was originally a township in the ancient parish of Acton in the Nantwich Hundred; it was served by St Mary's Church, Acton. Major early landowners include the families of Bulkeley, Wettenhall, Praers and Bromley. In the late 15th century the land was acquired by Sir William Needham of Shavington. Part of Austerson and the adjacent parish of Baddington was forest until at least the mid-17th century, with wood being used as fuel for salt production in nearby Nantwich. A kiln field marked on tithe maps suggests that the parish formerly had a brick kiln. A small council estate was built between 1953 and 1965.

== Governance ==
Austerson is administered by the Sound and District Parish Council. From 1974 the civil parish was served by Crewe and Nantwich Borough Council, which was succeeded on 1 April 2009 by the new unitary authority of Cheshire East. Since 2024 Austerson has been within the parliamentary constituency of Chester South and Eddisbury which is represented by Aphra Brandreth of the Conservative Party.

== Geography and transport ==
The civil parish has a total area of 950 acres (380 ha). The River Weaver forms much of the eastern boundary of the civil parish, and an unnamed brook forms part of the western boundary. The land is generally flat with an average elevation of around 50 metres, sloping downwards near the eastern boundary to the narrow river valley of the Weaver. There are several small meres and unnamed brooks. A narrow strip of broad-leaved woodland runs along a brook south of Dairy House Farm (SJ668478).

The A530 (Baddington Lane) runs immediately to the west of part of the north-western boundary of the civil parish. Coole Lane runs from the A530 north–south through the northern part of the civil parish. The Crewe and Nantwich Circular Walk also runs broadly north–south through the northern part.

== Demography ==
In 2006, the total population of the civil parish was estimated as 140. The 2001 census recorded a population of 145, in 37 households. The historical population figures were 59 (1801), 55 (1851), 36 (1901), 68 (1951) and 114 (1971).

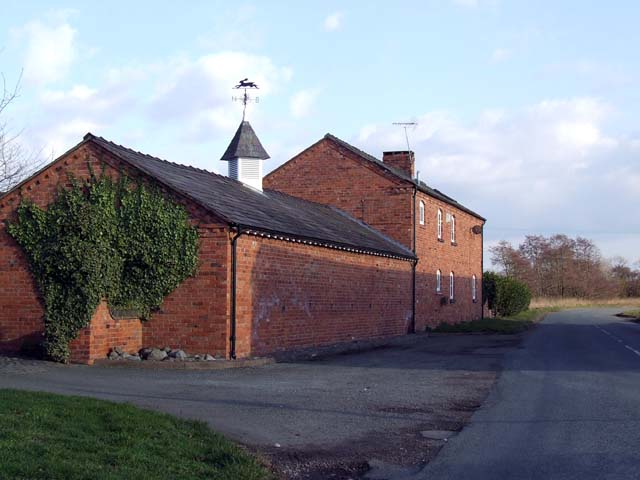
Church House Farm

== Landmarks ==
Austerson Hall (SJ652475) is a farmhouse dating from the late 17th century. In brick with a roughcast finish, it follows a T-shaped plan and is grade II listed. Church House Farm (SJ650504) is an L-shaped, red-brick former farmhouse dating from around 1820. It has been used as a nursing home since 1989, and is also listed at grade II. The timber-framed Elizabethan building of Austerson Old Hall or Old Hall Farm was moved to Alvanley in 1974. A grade-II-listed barn remains which dates from the late 16th century, and is brick nogged with a timber frame.

== Education ==
There are no educational facilities within the civil parish. The parish falls within the catchment areas of Sound and District Primary School in Sound and Brine Leas High School in Nantwich.

== See also ==
- Listed buildings in Austerson
