= Isabella Whitney =

English poet and writer

Isabella Whitney (most likely born between 1546 and 1548, died after 1624); fl. 1566–1600) was arguably the first female poet and professional woman writer in England. More specifically, Whitney is credited with being the first Englishwoman to have penned and published original secular poetry under her own name.

== Early life ==
Isabella Whitney was born in Cheshire, England. Her father, Geoffrey, was brother to Sir Robert Whitney, and their family was the Cheshire branch of the influential Whitney family, based in Clifford, Gorsington, Icomb and Castleton. At the time of her birth, her family were living at Coole Pilate in the parish of Acton, near Nantwich, though the family moved in 1558 when her father took a lease of a farm at Ryles Green, Audlem. Isabella Whitney was the second child, having an older brother, Geoffrey, four sisters - Anne, Margery, Mary and Dorothea - and a younger brother, Brooke. George Mainwaring, who is mentioned in A Sweet Nosegay and came from a prominent household in England, was a childhood friend of hers. Her brother, Geoffrey Whitney (named after their father), was a notable author of the time, whose works include A Choice of Emblemes and other Devises (1586). Geoffrey died in 1601 without a spouse.

== Personal life ==
Whitney lived and worked in London until 1573, when she lost her position under the mistress she was serving and became unemployed. The reason behind the loss of her employment is assumed to be due to slander as evidenced in A Sweet Nosegay. She lived in Abchurch Lane while she continued to write but her finances did not allow her to stay there for long. There is evidence that she reached out to friends and family for support, but they were unwilling or unable to supply it. Unable to support herself, she returned to the family home in Ryles Green. The Wilkersley court records for 1576 show her father being fined for the fact that his unmarried daughters, Dorothea and Isabella, were both pregnant. Isabella’s child, a girl, was baptised in September of that year in Audlem, but there is no further reference to her. Sometime around 1580, she married the physician of Audlem, Richard Eldershaw, a Catholic who was several times fined for non-attendance at church. In 1600 he was fined the sum of £240 at a time when a rural labourer would expect to earn £40-£60 a year. Perhaps this is why Whitney saw the benefit of using her contacts in the publishing world to make a little extra money around this time. They had two children: Marie and Edmund. 'Sister Eldershae' is mentioned in her brother’s will of 1601, as are Isabella's children and her husband, Richard. Dorothea is not mentioned in this will, so it is possible that she predeceased her brother. Geoffrey left his sister, Isabella, a quantity of silver. Isabella surfaces again in 1624, when her other brother, Brooke, a successful lawyer in London, makes his will and dies. There is no mention of Richard Eldershaw, suggesting he might have died. By this time, Isabella would have been in her seventies. No record of her death has so far surfaced, though her children are documented as living in Stafford as adults.

== Career ==
The term “pressing the press” insinuated a scandalous sexual behavior that inherently linked print to something perceived as negative. It is terms such as these that worked against women who wished to publish their work. In early modern England, many factors affected women’s access to the world of print. Public speaking was somehow associated with harlotry, many insisted that the proper place for women to be was inside of their homes, and a silent woman constituted as a mold all women should strive to fit. Whitney’s work directly addresses this issue of hesitation to publish one’s work due to the negative connotations associated with it.

It was especially harmful to Whitney also because of her current station as an unemployed single woman. The lack of opportunities for women, especially those like Whitney, created difficulties to make money in early modern London. Whitney is also writing her poetry in order to profit, even placing her writing in substitution for a husband that would normally work and profit for the house. Due to this, there exists the reasoning that since Whitney is a woman in print who uses her work to make money, many may have considered her to be a prostitute of sorts. This is because of how women publishing work to a public audience was seen as a scandalous, sexual act. It did not help that her persona of an unemployed maidservant was a group that was often linked to prostitution in early modern society.

Through her uncle’s contacts, Whitney built up contacts in the printing industry and began penning verse which was published, initially anonymously but later under her own name or initials, using the tropes in fashion at the time but subverting them from the traditional, socially-approved roles women and men were expected to play in relationships and society generally. Losing her job, she turned to her writing to support her, an endeavour in which she was supported by Richard Jones, an up and coming member of the Stationers Company. In 1567 Jones published a small collection of Whitney’s verse: The Copy of a letter, lately written in meeter, by a yonge Gentilwoman: to her vnconstant Louer. With an Admonition to al yonge Gentilwomen, and to all other Mayds in general to beware of mennes flattery. This collection of four poems in the popular epistolary form deals with relationship issues and presents four very different and somewhat unconventional views of how men and women ought to behave as lovers which serve to emphasise what she apparently saw as the hypocrisy and unfairness prevalent in society.

This criticism of accepted norms is used again in “A Sweet Nosgay” published in 1573 but this time she is attacking the status of women generally, not just as lovers. As she freely admits, she was inspired by Hugh Plat's Floures of Philosophie (1572), reworking some of his aphorisms on the themes of love, suffering, friendship, and depression with an added female perspective that many would call “proto-feminist”. She followed this section with ‘letters’ addressed to various family members and friends which enabled her to discuss aspects of her theme. The collection closes with arguably her best known work – Wyll – which demonstrates not only her intimate knowledge of London at this period but also uses a popular trope of the mock will to make social comment.

1578 saw the publication of The Lamentacion of a Gentilwoman which is considered to be Whitney’s work. It was written in response to the death of William Gruffith, Gentleman. Who this gentleman was is a mystery. Various suggestions have been put forward but no evidence has surfaced to support any of them.

Again in 1600 a work is published which has been ascribed to Whitney: Ovidius Naso His Remedie of Love. This collection comprises a translation of Remedia Armoris followed by ‘a letter to the Reader and two “epistles, of which one is translated out of Ouid, the other is an answere thereunto”’. That last of these is reckoned to be Whitney’s work and is written in the voice of Aeneas and addressed to Dido, the abandoned queen of Carthage – characters who frequently appear in Whitney’s work.

== Works ==
- The Copy of a letter, lately written in meeter, by a yonge Gentilwoman: to her vnconstant Louer. With an Admonitio to al yonge Gentilwomen, and to all other Mayds in general to beware of mennes flattery (1567). Whitney's first work, The Copy of a Letter (1566-7) contains four love complaints, two of which are in a female voice and two of which are in a male voice. Copy is a response to her former lover who has gone off and married another woman. It is speculated that this work may be imaginative rather than literal.
  The pictures seen here, from the Early English Books Online, are copies of Isabella's first published works. In 1567, The Copy of a letter… was published. The only living copy is housed at Oxford's Bodleian Library; it consisted of the following two poems.
    - “I.W. to her Unconstant Lover” (as seen on the right).
    - “The Admonition by the Auctor, to all Young Gentlewomen.”
- A Sweet Nosegay (1573). This, Whitney's second work, was inspired by Plat's Floures of Philosophie (1572), which she “cites punningly as ‘Plat’s [garden] Plot.’” She says that although he planted them, Isabella had to harvest and arrange them. This publication also came at a time in English history when people like Whitney, those not belonging to the upper class, were given the opportunity to purchase all sorts of different goods. With this newfound opportunity to read books came a well of knowledge filled with new ways to live. Whitney’s work contributed to this well with the versification of Hugh Plat’s humanist discourse. As aforementioned, London was in a great state of change as a capitalist mindset grew and “contaminated” the streets of London. This humanist knowledge from Plat is presented to her readers with intent to keep them in good health as they had kept herself well in the infected social and moral world around her.
- Perhaps the work she is most known for, A Sweet Nosegay, (as seen to the right) showcases Whitney’s style and independence. Within this second book of hers, she has changed from a woman who is depressed about love and romance to a woman who writes to the world as a single woman in London. A Sweet Nosegay also focuses on the suffering and illness that, in the end, forced her to leave London. Whitney expresses in her poetry that she is warned to avoid the lanes and streets which are contaminated with disease. Although this can be seen literally, these public spaces can also be references to the rather corrupted public circulation of print. While Whitney is returned to her space within the home where many men would say she is safe, in a rebellious manner she is still able to send her work out into the world. In order to share her nosegay as medicine to those who read it, her book must be exposed to the ratifications that come with public print. Whitney knows what it means to be a woman in public print and takes on this burden of corruption in order to be of some help to others.
- Through the poems, we receive seemingly autobiographical hints about Whitney, namely that she has two younger sisters who are in service, that Whitney is single and that is why she is allowed to write, that she is of low rank, and that despite serving a woman she admires, she has lost her position and is ill and financially struggling. She also indicates her independence by mentioning that she will earn her living by writing and selling her literary works. Through this, she shows the alienation that existed during this time and calls for a change.
  - "The Author to the Reader" – Since readers had not read anything from Whitney since 1567, she included a verse epistle titled “The Author to the Reader” to catch them up on the last six years.
  - After her epistle to the reader, Whitney's “110 quatrains of advice” that she picked from Plat's garden were printed. It was this section that specifically lent itself to the traditions of the time period, especially considering it was printed alongside her original narratives. She chose 110 out of the 883 poems, typically ones based on love, friendship, and poverty, and rewrites them through a more feminist lens, changing male-specific identifiers and references to be more general and inclusive.
  - “A Care-full Complaint by the Unfortunate Author” – Whitney here commiserates with the Queen of Carthage, Dido, for falling in love with an unworthy man. She also alludes to the fact that she too has thought of ending her life, much like Dido, but “in her familiar jocular tone and jaunty meter.” Leading all to wonder whether she was actually suicidal, or just a poetic device; theoretically either could be the case.
  - “Farewell to the Reader” – in this closing to A Sweet Nosegay Whitney asks for her readers to forgive her for borrowing from Plat; she also asks of her readers to bless both her and the originator. What set her apart, however (aside from the overt-feminism mentioned earlier) was that Whitney was “one of the few writers of the age to credit her contemporary source.”
- “Her Will and Testament” was Whitney's mock will, that not only said goodbye to her friends and family, but also to the city of London. As scholar Betty S. Travitsky notes “the lively, sometimes even madcap, mock legacy brings contemporary London alive… her vividness, perhaps the more remarkable for its presence in a non dramatic poem, reminds one of the London of the city comedies that would be a feature of the early-seventeenth-century stage.”
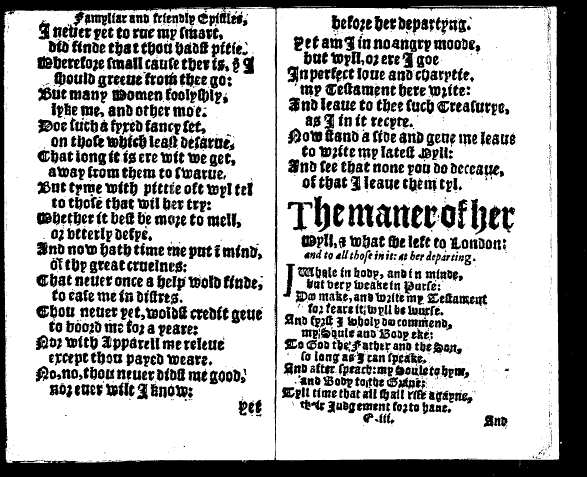
  This solidified Whitney as a trendsetter, even more so than her previous works. It had two parts:
    - “A Communication which the Author had to London, Before She made Her Will”– “Will and Testament” features Whitney's farewell to London. She describes the city vividly in a mock testament, using character sketches reminiscent of “Cock Lorell’s Boat.” In this work, she expresses her discontent towards the city's cruelty and indifference towards her but also shows regret in leaving. The manner of how she describes the city as an "undeserving lover" is reminiscent of a rocky romantic relationship. As with other works in Whitney's career, her feeling of abandonment by those around her is displayed in this piece as well.
    - “The manner of her will, and what she left to London and to all those in it at her departing” can be seen here (on the right). The piece begins with painting London as a charming city, however, the favorable tone shifts when she addresses the darker parts of London such as prisons and hospitals. Here, when looking at the prisons, Whitney addresses her own poverty by stating that she is so poor, she is unable to borrow money to be imprisoned for debt. Throughout the mock will, she leaves behind money and various things to the people of London as well as her family and friends, but, Whitney's irony shows since she owns none of those things and, therefore, has given nothing. English professor, Wendy Wall, argues that this will is an "attempt to assume control of the unfortunate circumstances. . .an act of possession by dispossession." In this way, Whitney writes her works in order to create ownership of things which her current position does not allow her to do so. This piece acts as a tourist guide to 16th century London. This work resonated with women readers, as is indicated by an imitator who wrote after Isabella's death.
- “The Lady Beloved Exclaimeth of the Great Untruth of her Lover” (1578)
- “The Lamentation of a Gentlewoman upon the Death of Her Late-Deceased Friend, William Gruffith, Gentleman” (1578). While the author of this poem has been highly debated, through careful analysis of the language, criticisms, and style used within the poem, scholar Randall Martin has said that he believes Whitney is the author. Whether the poem was actually penned by Whitney can be contested, but Martin certainly presents a grounded argument in favour of her authorship.
- “Ovidius Naso His Remedie of Love" (1600). Introduced as ‘that honourable and thrise renowned Sapho of our times’ Isabella Whitney returns to Dido’s story again. However, possibly as a result of her own personal experiences and maturity, the characters she depicts have changed and their passion has matured.

== Style ==
Whitney was a very unusual and progressive woman, especially for the sixteenth century. She was unconventional in many ways. While almost all women writers of the time were well connected and noble, Whitney was not, and because of this, she often criticized the financial situations of her time in her writing, as well as criticizing gender roles. She also hoped that her writings would bring her and her family some sort of income. Some critics claim that Whitney's poetry proclaimed her as an outsider, or “other,” who pursued her own interests publicly. Whitney was often upfront in the way that she wrote. A common theme in her works were of women in powerless positions and romance. During the time period she was living in, it was important for women to remain modest and under control, however, Whitney did the opposite of this. As Whitney had apologized for borrowing some of her ideas, she is one of a few who named their contemporary sources. Even more importantly, she gave a “public voice to breezily expressed secular concerns”. Furthermore, Whitney was the first writer, male or female, “to exhibit any concern for gender-based phrasing, a practice that took another four hundred years to catch on”. Similarly, scholars have argued that with her use of “complaint, manifesto, satire, [and] mock will,” Whitney was attempting to show a temporal utopia, long before utopia was a generic custom.

According to most critics, Isabella Whitney's works contained a certain degree of autobiographical material. This can be seen in two of her connected poems: A Communication Which the Author had to London before she Made Her Will and The Manner of Her Will, and What She Left to London and to All Those in it, of her Departing where the writer is not only lacking in finances, but also spends the majority her time amongst "the poor, the imprisoned, and the insane", otherwise known as the commonwealth of London. Her most innovative poems were her verse epistles, many of which were addressed to female relatives. She addressed her poem "Will and Testament" to the city of London, mocking it as a heartless friend, greedy and lacking charity. These works were written in ballad metre and contained both witty and animated descriptions of everyday life. Judging from these popular inclusions, it is likely that the reason for the publishing of her works was simply to supplement her scanty income. As she states in an epistle to "her Sister Misteris A.B." in A Sweet Nosegay, "til some houshold cares mee tye, / My bookes and Pen I will apply," possibly suggesting that she sought a professional writing career to support her in an unmarried state. Whitney's publisher, Richard Jones, was a prominent figure in the contemporary market for ballads, and his purchase of her manuscripts makes sense in this regard, even if little evidence of their relationship survives beyond the front matter to The Copy of a Letter (1567).

Isabella Whitney pioneered her field of women poets. While a lot of her practices (familiar allusions, exaggerations, the ballad measure) were common for contemporary male authors of the mid-sixteenth century, as a woman she was quite the trendsetter (in both her epistles and mock testament). She published her poetry in a time when it was not customary for a woman, especially one not of the aristocracy, to do so. In addition, her material contained controversial issues such as class-consciousness and political commentary as well as witty satire, and was made available to the upper and the middle class. Whitney's two best known works are The Copy of a Letter written in 1567?, and A Sweet Nosgay written in 1573.

== Writings ==
- The Copy of a Letter, Lately Written in Meter, by a Young Gentlewoman To her Unconstant Lover (From The Copy of a Letter, 1567)
- The Admonition by the Auctor, To All Young Gentlewomen: And to all other maids being in love (From the Copy of a letter, 1567)
- The Author to the Reader (From A sweet Nosgay, 1573)
- A Sweet Nosgay, or Pleasant Poise: Containing a Hundred and Ten Philosophical Flowers (From A sweet Nosgay, 1573)
- A Soueraigne Recipt (From A sweet Nosgay, 1573)
- A Farewell to the Reader (From A sweet Nosgay, 1573)
- To Her Brother. G. VV. (From A sweet Nosgay, 1573)
- To Her Brother. B. VV. (From A sweet Nosgay, 1573)
- An Order Prescribed, by IS. VV. To Two of her Younger Sisters in London (From A sweet Nosgay, 1573)
- To Her Sister Mistress A.B. (From A sweet Nosgay, 1573)
- To Her Cousin F. VV. (From A sweet Nosgay, 1573)
- A Care-full Complaint by the Unfortunate Author (From A sweet Nosgay, 1573)
- I Reply to the Same (From A sweet Nosgay, 1573)
- IS. VV. TO C. B. in Bewaylynge her mishaps (From A sweet Nosgay, 1573)
- To my Friend Master T.L. Whose Good Nature: I See Abusde (From A sweet Nosgay, 1573)
- IS. VV. Being Wery of Writing, Send this for Answer (From A sweet Nosgay, 1573)
- The Author Upon Her Friends Procurement is Constrained to Depart (From A sweet Nosgay, 1573)
- The Manner of her Will & What She Left to London: And to All Those in it: at her departing (From A sweet Nosgay, 1573)
- A Communication which the Author Had to London, Before She Made Her Will
- The Lady-Beloved Exclaimeth of the Great Untruth of her Lover
- The Lamentation of a Gentlewoman upon the Death of Her Late-Deceased Friend, William Gruffith, Gentleman (1578)
- Will and Testament (1573)
- Ovidius Naso His Remedie of Love (1600)

== Timeline of events ==
- 1548 (?) – Born in Coole Pilate, Cheshire to Geffrey and Joan Whitney(nee Cartwright)
- After 1558 – Isabella goes to London
- 1566-1572 – Sometime within these years, Whitney loses her employment.
- 1566/1567 – Within this year, Whitney sells two of her poems to Richard Jones.
- 1572 – Richard Jones publishes ‘A Sweet Nosgay’
- 1573 – Whitney is living in Abchurch Lane, London but getting ready to go to Cheshire.
- 1577 – William Gruffith dies.
- 1601 – Geoffrey, Isabella’s brother dies, mentioning ‘Sister Eldershae’ in his Will.
- 1624 – Brooke, Isabella’s younger brother dies, mentioning ‘my sister Isabell’ in his Will.

== Related Pages ==
- Mary Sidney
