= Listed buildings in Baddington =

Baddington is a civil parish in Cheshire East, England. It contains ten buildings that are recorded in the National Heritage List for England as designated listed buildings. Of these, one is listed at Grade II*, the middle grade, and the others are at Grade II. The parish is entirely rural. The Shropshire Union Canal runs through it, and seven of the listed buildings are associated with the canal, three bridges, two locks, and two mileposts. The other listed buildings are farmhouses.

== Key ==
Grade	Criteria
II*	Particularly important buildings of more than special interest
II	Buildings of national importance and special interest

== Buildings ==
Name and location	Photograph	Date	Notes	Grade
Hack House; 53.03384°N 2.52435°W	—	Early 17th century	A timber-framed farmhouse with brick nogging and a slate roof. It is in two storeys and has a three-bay front. A wing was added to the southeast later in the 17th century; this is mainly in brick. There is a two-storey gabled timber-framed porch, which is jettied at the first floor and at the gable level. Also on the front are two five-light oriel windows, one on each floor. Inside the building is an inglenook.	II*
Hack House Farmhouse; 53.02873°N 2.53303°W	—	Early 17th century	The farmhouse is built in brick, partly roughcast, and has a tiled roof. It is in two storeys with and attic, and has a front of three bays. There is also a later three-bay wing, giving it a T-shaped plan. The windows are casements. Inside the house is a large inglenook beam.	II
Baddington Bank Farmhouse; 53.04388°N 2.53871°W	—	Late 17th century	A brick farmhouse with a slate roof, it has an L-shaped plan, is in two storeys with an attic, and has a three-bay front. The windows are casements, with an attic window in a gabled dormer. The gables have bargeboards. There is a projecting brick porch with a semicircular opening and small side openings.	II
Milepost; 53.04471°N 2.54136°W	—	Early 19th century	The milepost is located to the north of Baddington Lane Bridge on the Shropshire Union Canal. It consists of a circular cast iron post with a domed top. It carries a plate divided into three panels inscribed with the distances in miles to Nantwich, Autherley Junction, and Norbury Junction.	II
Milepost; 53.03193°N 2.53656°W		Early 19th century	The milepost is located to the north of Hack Green Bridge on the Shropshire Union Canal. It consists of a circular cast iron post with a domed top. It carries three plates inscribed with the distances in miles to Nantwich, Autherley Junction, and Norbury Junction.	II
Burrows Bridge (number 85); 53.02905°N 2.53498°W		c. 1826	This is bridge number 85 over the Shropshire Union Canal, the consultant being Thomas Telford. It carries French Lane over the canal, and is built in brick and stone. The bridge consists of a single elliptical arch, with a humped roadway. There are curving approach walls, and end piers with rounded caps. On the arch are cast iron rubbing posts, and the towpath is lined with brick.	II
Hack Green Bridge (number 86); 53.03156°N 2.53647°W		c. 1826	This is bridge number 86 over the Shropshire Union Canal, the consultant being Thomas Telford. It is an accommodation bridge, and is built in brick and stone. The bridge consists of a single elliptical arch, with a humped trackway. There are curving approach walls, and end piers with rounded caps. On the arch are cast iron rubbing posts, and the towpath is lined in brick with raised courses for hoof grip.	II
Baddington Lane Bridge (number 88); 53.04312°N 2.54143°W		c. 1826	This is bridge number 85 over the Shropshire Union Canal, the consultant being Thomas Telford. It carries the A530 road over the canal, and is built in brick and stone. The bridge consists of a wide elliptical skewed arch, with stone springers. There are curving approach walls, and end piers with rounded caps. On the arch are cast iron rubbing posts, and the towpath is lined in brick with raised courses for hoof grip.	II
Hack Green Lock number 1; 53.03136°N 2.53637°W		c. 1826	The lock is located immediately south of Hack Green Bridge on the Shropshire Union Canal, the consultant being Thomas Telford. It is built in brick and sandstone. The upper gates are in timber, the lower gate is metal with a wooden beam. There is winding gear near the lower gate.	II
Hack Green Lock number 2; 53.03289°N 2.53727°W		c. 1826	The lock is located to the north of Hack Green Bridge on the Shropshire Union Canal, the consultant being Thomas Telford. It is built in brick and sandstone. The upper gate is metal, the lower gates are in timber.	II
