= Crewe Municipal Buildings =

Municipal building in Crewe, Cheshire, England

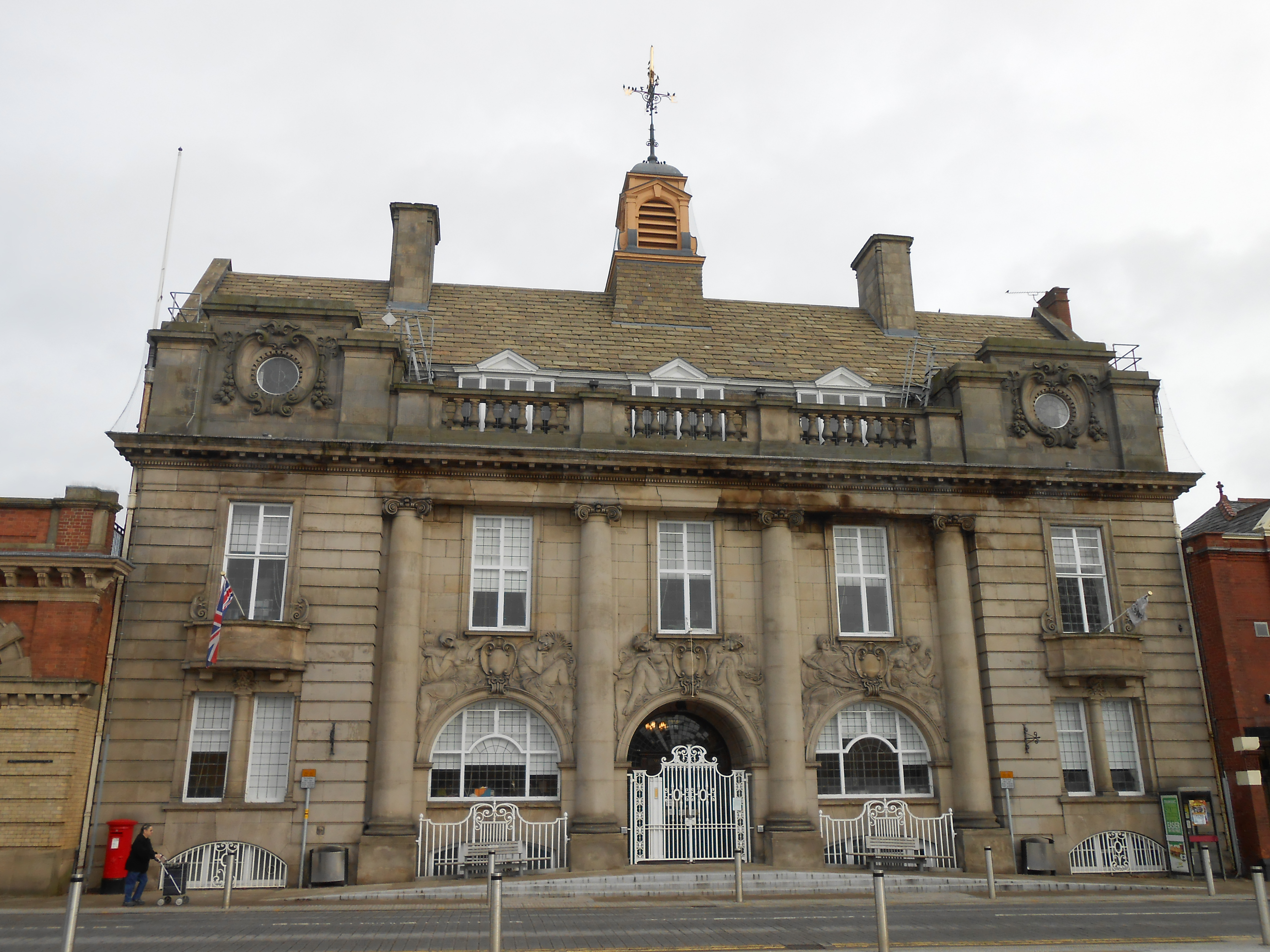
- Crewe Municipal Buildings

- Shown in Cheshire
- 53.0985°N 2.4394°W
- Location: Earle Street, Crewe

History
- Built: 1905

Site notes
- Architect: Henry Hare
- Architectural style: Baroque style

Listed Building – Grade II
- Official name: The Municipal Buildings
- Designated: 6 July 1976
- Reference no.: 1136190

Crewe Municipal Buildings is a municipal building in Earle Street, Crewe, Cheshire, England. The buildings, which formed the headquarters of Crewe and Nantwich Borough Council, are Grade II listed.

== History ==
After significant industrial growth, largely following the construction of the railway station which had opened in 1837, Crewe became a municipal borough in 1877. In this context, civic leaders decided to procure municipal buildings: the site chosen on the north side of Earle Street had been occupied by a row of commercial properties with an old corn exchange located behind them.

Following a design competition, which was initiated in May 1902, Henry Hare was selected as the preferred architect. The foundation stone for the new building was laid by the mayor, James Henry Moore, on 3 September 1903. It was designed in the Baroque style, built by Robert Neil and Sons of Manchester at a cost of around £20,000 and was officially opened on 19 July 1905. The design involved a symmetrical main frontage with five bays facing onto Earle Street with the end bays slightly projected forward with balconies on the first floor and topped with pediments containing oculi; the central section of three bays featured an arched doorway with a fanlight flanked by round headed windows; above these openings there were featured carvings of reclining figures sculpted by Frederick Schenck. There was a row of sash windows on the first floor; each of the bays in the central section was flanked by full-height Ionic order columns supporting an entablature and a parapet. At roof level, there was a turret with a weather vane in the form of Stephenson's Rocket. Internally, the main rooms were the council chamber and the mayor's parlour.

Pevsner described the building as being "too small to achieve its full effect". Nevertheless, it was one of the few older buildings in the town which survived the redevelopment purges of the 20th century.

A bronze model of a locomotive, built by a fitter, Harry Lightfoot, which had originally stood at in front of the Second Boer War memorial in Queen's Park and which was on display at the Crewe Heritage Centre for its official opening by Queen Elizabeth II, accompanied by the Duke of Edinburgh, on 24 July 1987, was permanently relocated to the municipal buildings and placed on display in the foyer.

The building continued to serve as the headquarters of the borough council for much of the 20th century. When local government was reformed in 1974, the building became the meeting place of the new Crewe and Nantwich Borough Council. However, the new council had its main offices at a new building called Delamere House on Delamere Street, a joint facility shared with Cheshire County Council, which was completed in 1974 just before the local government reorganisation took effect. Delamere House was later supplemented with additional offices in a large extension to the rear of the Municipal Buildings, completed in 1991.

Local government in Cheshire was reformed again in 2009, when both Cheshire County Council and Crewe and Nantwich Borough Council were abolished and the new Cheshire East unitary authority was created. The Municipal Buildings are used as one of the meeting places of Cheshire East Council. The council initially established its main offices in Sandbach, but in 2023 announced plans to make Delamere House in Crewe its main office.

Prince Edward, Earl of Wessex visited the Municipal Buildings and met with apprentices on 16 April 2013. The building is also used as the main meeting place of Crewe Town Council, which was formed in April 2013, and serves as an official venue for marriages and civil partnerships.

== See also ==
- Listed buildings in Crewe
