= A529 road =

Road in England

A529

Route information
- Length: 19 mi (31 km)

Major junctions
- South end: Hinstock, Shropshire
- A53 A525 A530
- North end: Nantwich, Cheshire

Location
- Country: United Kingdom
- Primary destinations: Market Drayton

Road network
- Roads in the United Kingdom; Motorways; A and B road zones

The A529 road is a non-primary road in England that runs from the A41 at Hinstock in Shropshire to the A530 in Nantwich, Cheshire. From 1922 to 1935 it ran between Chester and Hinstock when the section north of Whitchurch became part of a rerouted A41.

The A529 outside Market Drayton was listed by the government as one of the 50 most dangerous roads in 2016. Improvements were made to the road in 2019, 2023, and 2024.
