= A525 road =

Road in England and Wales

A525

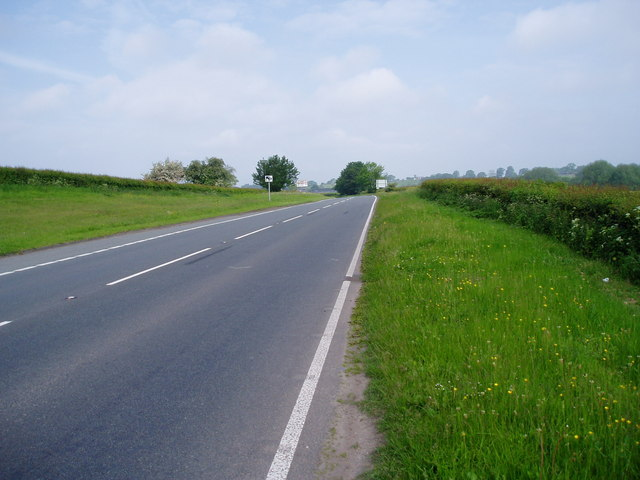
- The A525 between Whitchurch and Bangor on Dee

Route information
- Length: 73 mi (117 km)

Major junctions
- North end: Rhyl; 53.3195°N 3.4884°W
- A548 A547; A55 A541 A543 A494 A542 A5104 A483 A534 A539 A495; A41 A530 A529; A51 A531; A34
- South end: Newcastle-under-Lyme; 53.0106°N 2.2305°W

Location
- Country: United Kingdom
- Primary destinations: Rhuddlan; St Asaph; Denbigh; Ruthin; Wrexham; Whitchurch

Road network
- Roads in the United Kingdom; Motorways; A and B road zones

The A525 is a major route from Rhyl in Wales to Newcastle-under-Lyme in England. The route passes near Denbigh, through Ruthin, through Wrexham and near Whitchurch.

The route is a dual carriageway just south of Rhyl. As of 10 March, 2010, the section between Wrexham and Whitchurch is not classified as a primary route, and the section between Burleydam, (to the East of Whitchurch where it is a "TOTSO" with the A530 to Nantwich) and Newcastle (via Audlem) is also now a non-primary A road.

In total, the A525 is 73 miles (117 km) in length.

== Route ==
A548 in Rhyl
A547 in Rhuddlan

- A55 road, junctions 27 & 27a;
- St Asaph;

A541 in Trefnant

- roundabouts with A543 road;
- Llanrhaeadr (bypassed);
- Rhewl;

A494 in Ruthin

- Nant y Garth Pass
- junction with A542 road;
- crossed by A5104 road south of Llandegla;
- Four Crosses;
- Bwlchgwyn;
- Coedpoeth;
- Intersection with A483 road;
- Wrexham (crosses A543 road as part of ring road);
- Marchwiel (junction with A528 road);
- bypasses Bangor on Dee;
- junction with A539 road;
- junction with A495 road;
- joins A41 trunk road to form Whitchurch bypass;
- leaves A41 to continue through Broughall;
- junction with A530 road;
- Audlem (crosses A529 road and crosses Shropshire Union Canal);
- Buerton;
- Woore (crosses A51 road);

A41 / A518 to Madeley

- passes under M6 motorway

A531 in Madeley Heath
A34 in Newcastle-under-Lyme

== Names of A525 ==
Parts of the A525 are named roads, including:

- Wrexham Road
- Nant y Garth Pass
- Lon Parcwr (Park Lane)
- Ruthin Road
- Newcastle Road
- Whitchurch Road
- Vale Road
