= Listed buildings in Sound, Cheshire =

Sound is a civil parish in Cheshire East, England. It contains three buildings that are recorded in the National Heritage List for England as designated listed buildings, all of which are listed at Grade II. This grade is the lowest of the three gradings given to listed buildings and is applied to "buildings of national importance and special interest". The parish is mainly rural, and the listed buildings consist of two farmhouses and a school.

Name and location	Photograph	Date	Notes
Sound Oak Farmhouse; 53.03787°N 2.57243°W		Early 17th century	A timber-framed farmhouse with plaster panels and a tiled roof. It is in two storeys and has a four-bay front, the outer gabled bays projecting forward, giving the building an H-shaped plan. The outer bays are slightly jettied at the upper floor and eaves level. In front of the middle two bays is a loggia, and the windows are mullioned and transomed.
Fulhurst Hall; 53.04739°N 2.56507°W		17th century	A farmhouse built partly in timber-framing and partly in brick, some of which is painted to resemble timber-framing. It has a tiled roof, is in two storeys with an attic, and has a rear wing, giving it a T-shaped plan. The front is in three bays, and has a gabled timber porch with bargeboards and finials. The windows are casements, those in the attic being in gabled dormers.
Sound School; 53.03018°N 2.55498°W		1876	Built as a village school with attached schoolmaster's house, it is in red and blue brick with a tiled roof. The former house on the left is in two storeys with a gabled single-bay front. It has mullioned casement windows. The school is in a single storey with three gables has a porch with a lean-to roof. The windows are mullioned and transomed. On the ridge is a bell-turret with a steep pyramidal shingled roof and a weathervane.
