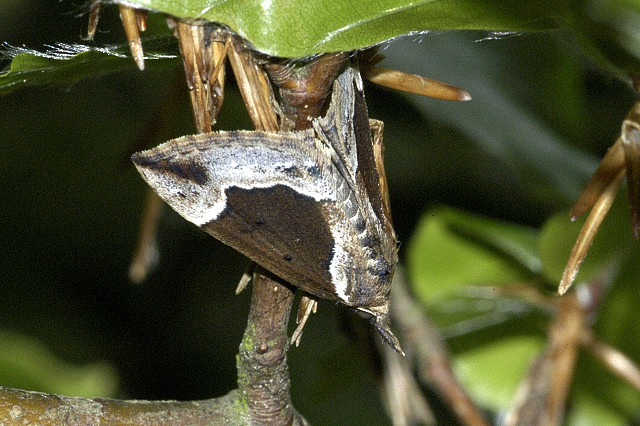

Scientific classification
- Kingdom: Animalia
- Phylum: Arthropoda
- Class: Insecta
- Order: Lepidoptera
- Superfamily: Noctuoidea
- Family: Erebidae
- Genus: Hypena
- Species: H. crassalis

Binomial name
- Hypena crassalis (Fabricius, 1787)

= Hypena crassalis =

Beautiful snout

Species of moth

Hypena crassalis, the beautiful snout, is a species of moth in the family Erebidae. It was first described by Johan Christian Fabricius in 1787 and is found in Europe.

== Distribution ==
Hypena crassalis is found throughout Europe except for the furthest south and north. To the east to Armenia and southern Russia.

== Technical description and variation ==
The wingspan is 25–30 mm. The length of the forewings is 14–16 mm. Forewing with basal two-thirds dark chocolate brown, limited by the pale outer line, which is oblique and concave outwards to vein 5, there strongly angled, and sinuous inwards to inner margin beyond middle, meeting on vein 1 an oblique line from base of median vein; the area below it pale with bright brown suffusion in male, chalk white with faint discoloration in female; terminal area grey in male, chalk white in female; subterminal line formed of interrupted fuscous lunules tipped with white in the male and preceded by brown suffusion; in the female merely a row of dark spots; an oblique thick brown streak from apex; a row of black terminal triangular spots; a dark dot in cell and lunule at its end; hindwing dark brownish fuscous with a ruddy tinge in male, greyish white or pale fuscous in female; the ab. terricularis Hbn. is a nearly black form of the male with a few terminal white markings.

== Biology ==
The moth flies in one generation from mid-May to August.

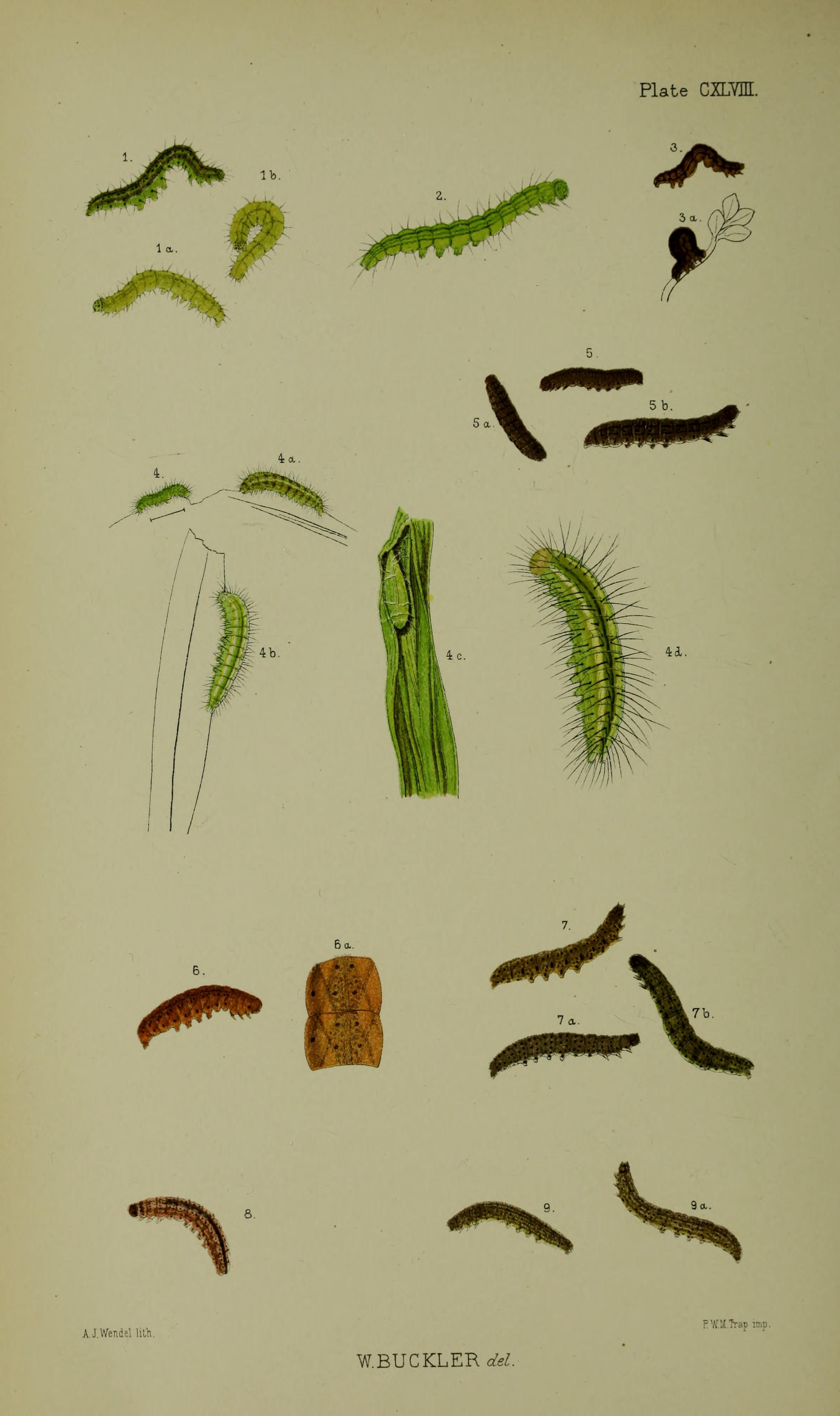
Fig. 2 larvae after final moult, on bilberry

The larva is green with the lines darker; feeding on Vaccinium. The species overwinters as a pupa, sometimes as a larva.
