= Crewe and Nantwich =

Former borough in Cheshire, England

Coordinates: 53.09320°N 2.48703°W

Borough of Crewe and Nantwich
- Shown within Cheshire
- History
  - Origin: Crewe Municipal Borough; Nantwich Urban District; Nantwich Rural District
  - Created: 1 April 1974
  - Abolished: 31 March 2009
  - Succeeded by: Cheshire East
- Status: Non-metropolitan district
- ONS code: 13UD
  - HQ: Crewe

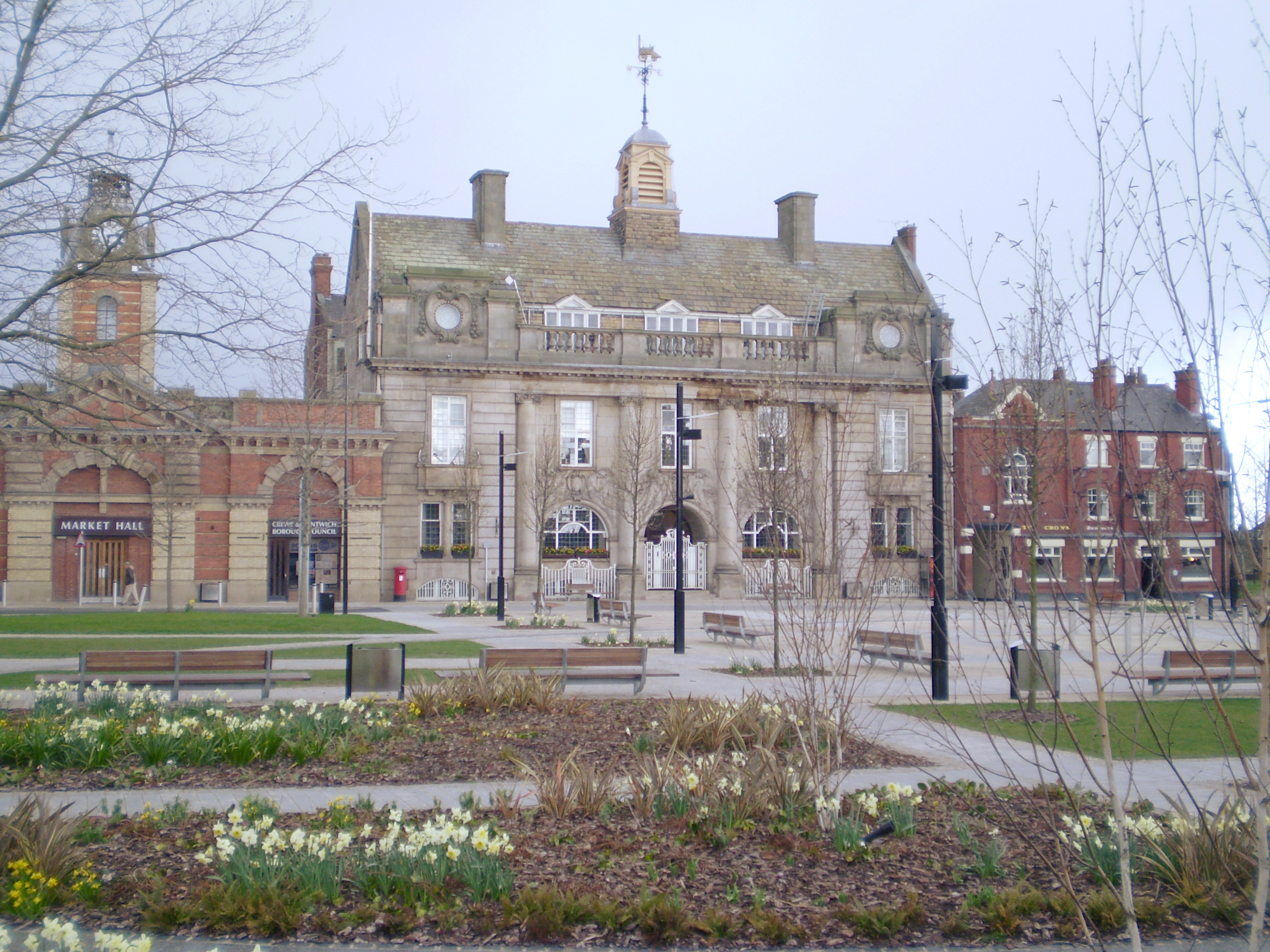
The Municipal Buildings in Crewe, head office of the Borough Council.

Crewe and Nantwich was, from 1974 to 2009, a local government district with borough status in Cheshire, England. It had a population (2001 census) of 111,007. It contained 69 civil parishes and one unparished area: the town of Crewe. It now forms part of the unitary authority of Cheshire East.

== History ==
The Borough of Crewe and Nantwich was created on 1 April 1974 under the Local Government Act 1972 by the merger of the borough of Crewe (an industrial town), the urban district of Nantwich (a smaller market town), and Nantwich Rural District. The new district was proposed to be called just "Crewe", but the shadow authority elected in 1973 to oversee the transition to the new system successfully petitioned the government to change the name to "Crewe and Nantwich" before the district came into being. The new district was awarded borough status from its creation, allowing the chairman of the council to take the title of mayor.

In 2006 the Department for Communities and Local Government considered reorganising Cheshire's administrative structure as part of the 2009 structural changes to local government in England. The decision to merge the boroughs of Crewe and Nantwich, Congleton and Macclesfield to create a single unitary authority was announced on 25 July 2007, following a consultation period in which a proposal to create a single Cheshire unitary authority was rejected.

The Borough of Crewe and Nantwich was abolished on 1 April 2009, when the new Cheshire East unitary authority was formed.

== Civil parishes ==
The former Crewe Municipal Borough was unparished, but the rest of the Crewe and Nantwich district included the following civil parishes:

- Acton
- Alpraham
- Aston juxta Mondrum
- Audlem
- Austerson
- Baddiley
- Baddington
- Barthomley
- Basford
- Batherton
- Bickerton
- Blakenhall
- Bridgemere
- Brindley
- Broomhall
- Buerton
- Bulkeley
- Bunbury
- Burland
- Calveley
- Checkley cum Wrinehill
- Cholmondeley
- Cholmondeston
- Chorley
- Chorlton
- Church Minshull
- Coole Pilate
- Crewe Green
- Dodcott cum Wilkesley
- Doddington
- Edleston
- Egerton
- Faddiley
- Hankelow
- Haslington
- Hatherton
- Haughton
- Henhull
- Hough
- Hunsterson
- Hurleston
- Lea
- Leighton
- Marbury cum Quoisley
- Minshull Vernon
- Nantwich (town)
- Newhall
- Norbury
- Peckforton
- Poole
- Ridley
- Rope
- Shavington cum Gresty
- Sound
- Spurstow
- Stapeley
- Stoke
- Walgherton
- Wardle
- Warmingham
- Weston
- Wettenhall
- Willaston
- Wirswall
- Wistaston
- Woolstanwood
- Worleston
- Wrenbury cum Frith
- Wybunbury

== Political control ==
The first elections to the council were held in 1973, initially operating as a shadow authority until the new arrangements came into effect on 1 April 1974. Political control of the council from 1974 until its abolition in 2009 was as follows:

Party in control	Years
Labour	1974–1976
No overall control	1976–1990
Labour	1990–2002
No overall control	2002–2009

=== Leadership ===
The leaders of the council from 1974 were:

Councillor	Party	From	To
Donald Holt	Labour	1974	1976
Anne Blacklay	Conservative	1976	1979
Donald Holt	Labour	1979	11 Mar 1983
Anne Blacklay	Conservative	18 May 1983	May 1984
Brian Silvester	Conservative	May 1984	May 1990
Peter Kent	Labour	May 1990	7 May 2006
Brian Silvester	Conservative	17 May 2006	14 May 2008
John Hammond	Conservative	14 May 2008	31 Mar 2009

On 4 May 2006 a referendum was held to decide whether the "Leader and Cabinet" form of local government would be replaced by an elected mayor. The proposal was rejected by 18,768 (60.8%) votes to 11,808 (38.2%) on a 35.3% turnout.

=== Premises ===
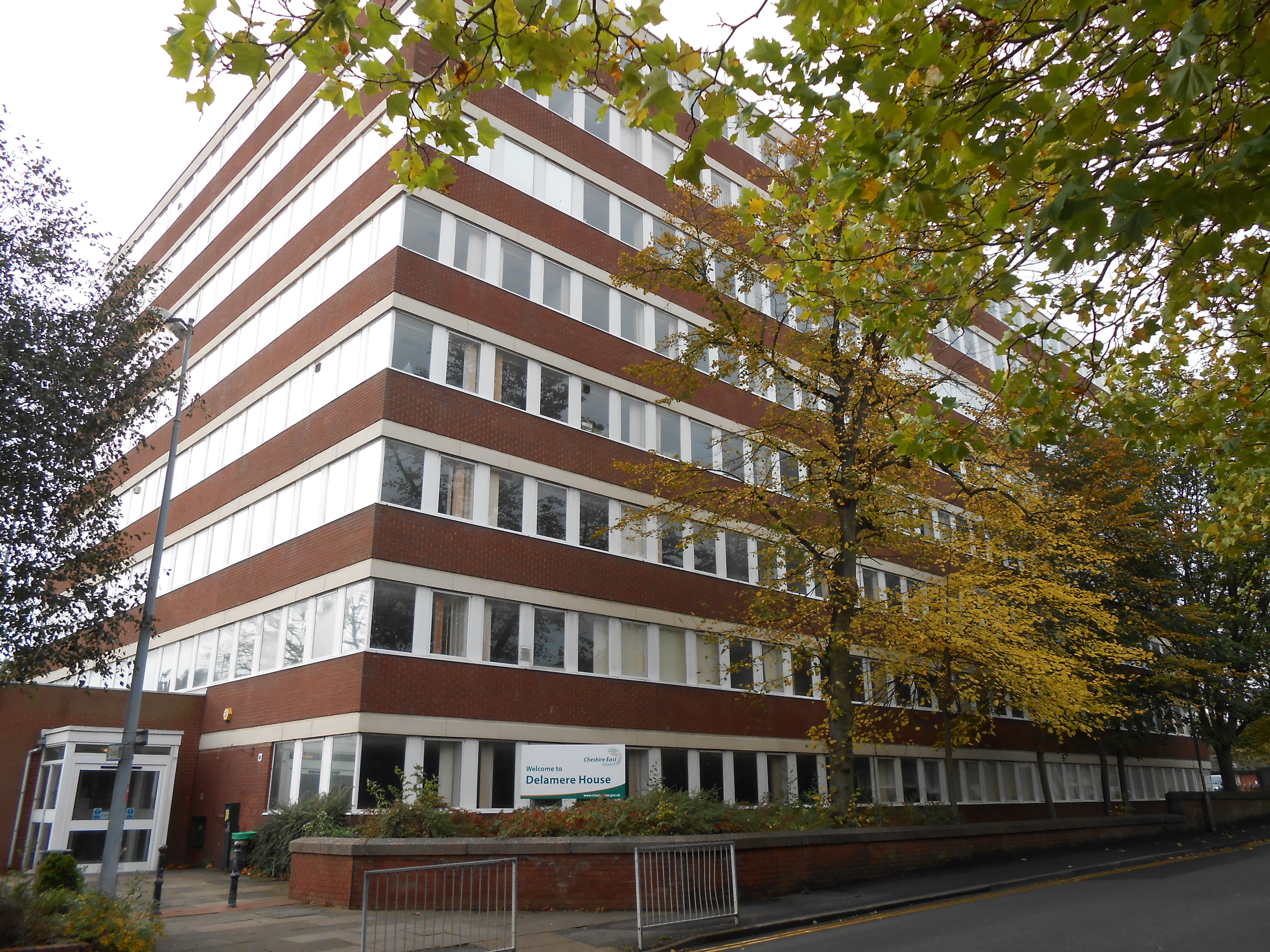
Delamere House, Crewe: Council's main offices from 1974

The council met at the Municipal Buildings in Earle Street, Crewe, which had been completed for the former Crewe Borough Council in 1905. The main administrative offices were at Delamere House on Delamere Street in Crewe, which was built as a joint facility for both the new Crewe and Nantwich Borough Council and Cheshire County Council, being completed in 1974 just before local government reorganisation took effect. Delamere House was later supplemented with additional offices in a large extension to the rear of the Municipal Buildings, completed in 1991.

== Twin towns ==
Crewe and Nantwich was twinned with:

- Mâcon, France

== Council elections ==
- 1973 Crewe Borough Council election
- 1976 Crewe and Nantwich Borough Council election
- 1979 Crewe and Nantwich Borough Council election (New ward boundaries)
- 1980 Crewe and Nantwich Borough Council election
- 1982 Crewe and Nantwich Borough Council election
- 1983 Crewe and Nantwich Borough Council election
- 1984 Crewe and Nantwich Borough Council election
- 1986 Crewe and Nantwich Borough Council election
- 1987 Crewe and Nantwich Borough Council election
- 1988 Crewe and Nantwich Borough Council election
- 1990 Crewe and Nantwich Borough Council election
- 1991 Crewe and Nantwich Borough Council election
- 1992 Crewe and Nantwich Borough Council election
- 1994 Crewe and Nantwich Borough Council election
- 1995 Crewe and Nantwich Borough Council election
- 1996 Crewe and Nantwich Borough Council election
- 1998 Crewe and Nantwich Borough Council election
- 1999 Crewe and Nantwich Borough Council election (New ward boundaries)
- 2000 Crewe and Nantwich Borough Council election
- 2002 Crewe and Nantwich Borough Council election
- 2003 Crewe and Nantwich Borough Council election
- 2004 Crewe and Nantwich Borough Council election
- 2006 Crewe and Nantwich Borough Council election
- 2007 Crewe and Nantwich Borough Council election

=== Results maps ===
2002 results map

2003 results map

2004 results map

2006 results map

2007 results map

== Freedom of the Borough ==
The following people and military units have received the Freedom of the Borough of Crewe and Nantwich.

=== Individuals ===
- Dario Gradi: 13 August 2003.
- John Bowler: 13 August 2003.

=== Military Units ===
- The Cheshire Regiment: 1986.
- 1st Battalion The Mercian Regiment: 5 November 2008.
