= Brine Leas School =

Secondary school in Cheshire

Coordinates: 53.0564°N 2.5148°W

Location
- Audlem Road; Nantwich, Cheshire, CW5 7DY; England

Information
- Type: Academy
- Local authority: Cheshire East
- Department for Education URN: 136279 Tables
- Ofsted: Reports
- Chair: Su Turner
- Headmaster: Paul Whitehead
- Gender: Co-educational
- Age: 11 to 18
- Enrolment: 1,278 pupils
- Houses: Audley, Lovell, Warwick
- Colours: Red, Green, Yellow
- Website: brineleas.co.uk

Brine Leas School is an academy school in Nantwich, Cheshire, England. The school has 1,287 pupils enrolled, and has technology and language status.

The school opened in 1977 as a comprehensive co-educational establishment. The first head teacher was Daphne Howard; on her retirement Michael Butler became head teacher. Andrew Cliffe became the school's third head teacher in September 2007. In September 2010, the school became one of just 32 to take up academy status. In 2011, the school received a capital grant of over £1 million to improve facilities around the site.

The 2008 Ofsted inspection outlined the school as having outstanding overall effectiveness, with constantly exceptional pupil achievement. As of 2024, the school's most recent inspection was in 2022, with an outcome of Good.

The school opened a sixth form in September 2010. In 2016, the school became part of the Brine Multi Academy Trust.

On the 29th April 2024, it was reported that the headteacher David Cole had died the previous day.

== Notable alumni ==
- Bryony Page, trampoline gold medal winner in the 2024 Olympics
- Sam Retford, actor in Channel 4 drama Ackley Bridge
- Laura Smith, Member of Parliament for Crewe and Nantwich between 2017 and 2019
- Blitz Kids, an alternative rock band from Nantwich and Crewe
- AJ Pritchard, dancer and television personality
