= A530 road =

Road in England

Coordinates: 53.12583°N 2.47905°W

A530

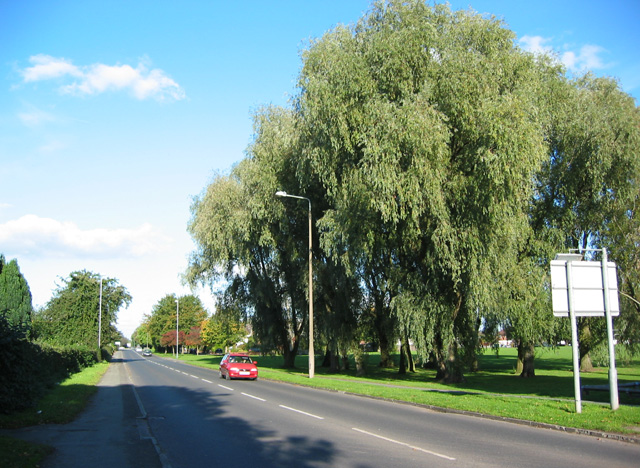
- A530 north of Nantwich

Route information
- Length: 23 mi (37 km)

Major junctions
- South end: Whitchurch, Shropshire
- A529 A534; A51 A534 A500 A532; A54 A556 A559
- North end: Lostock Gralam, Cheshire

Location
- Country: United Kingdom
- Primary destinations: Nantwich, Middlewich

Road network
- Roads in the United Kingdom; Motorways; A and B road zones

The A530 road is a road linking the A525 east of Whitchurch, Shropshire, England with the A559 east of Northwich, in Cheshire. The road follows the route:

- A525
- Nantwich
- Crewe
- Middlewich
- A559

The road is a non primary route, except between Middlewich and the A556, east-south-east of Northwich (Croxton Lane and King Street).

The road is also one of the 5th dangerous roads in England regarding crashes (especially at the junctions at Wistaston Green Road and Colley's Lane) in Alvaston, Nantwich.
