= Grade I listed non-ecclesiastical buildings in Cheshire =

This list does not contain the Grade I listed churches, or the Grade I listed buildings in the city of Chester. For these see Grade I listed churches in Cheshire and Grade I listed buildings in Chester.

The Grade I listed buildings in Cheshire, excluding those in the city of Chester, total around 80. Almost half of these are churches that are contained in a separate list.

Most Cheshire buildings are in sandstone, brick or are timber framed. Limestone is used for some buildings in the east of the county. Compared with other counties, timber framing is important. Cheshire has a higher proportion of timber-framed houses than most other English counties.

== Buildings ==
Name	Place	Map ref	Date	Notes	Image
Dorfold Hall	Acton	53.0685°N 2.5451°W	1616–21	Built for Ralph Wilbraham. Considered to be one of the two finest Jacobean houses in Cheshire.	Dorfold Hall
Adlington Hall	Adlington	53.3209°N 2.1446°W	15–16th century; mid-18th century	Manor house partly timber framed, partly brick.	
Chorley Old Hall	Alderley Edge	53.2999°N 2.2452°W	c. 1330, mid-16th century	Manor house with one range built in brick and the other timber framed.	
Iron Bridge	Aldford	53.1347°N 2.870822°W	1824	Bridge over the River Dee on the Buerton Approach to Eaton Hall. Built for the 1st Marquis of Westminster.	
Cruck barn	Arley Hall	53.3242°N 2.4901°W	Early 16th century	Former barn converted into an indoor riding school.	
Moss Hall	Audlem	52.9930°N 2.5152°W	1616	Timber framed manor house, extensively renovated in 1902.	
Beeston Castle	Beeston	53.129012°N 2.691297°W	1220s	Built by Ranulph de Blondeville, 4th Earl of Chester. Both the walls of the outer bailey, and the walls, towers and gatehouse of the inner baileys are listed at Grade I. Partly demolished after the Civil War.	
Brereton Hall	Brereton	53.1789°N 2.3324°W	1586	Built for Sir William Brereton. Alterations made in the 19th century, including removal of the cupolas.	
Highfields	Buerton	52.9654°N 2.4855°W	1615	Built for the Dodds family. Additions made in 1750 and 1897.	
Sankey Viaduct	Burtonwood	53.44745°N 2.65076°W	1830	By George Stephenson for the Liverpool and Manchester Railway. Earliest major railway viaduct in the world.	
Lower Carden Hall	Carden	53.0637°N 2.8030°W	15th century and later	Country house most of which is timber framed.	
Combermere Abbey	Combermere Park	52.993611°N 2.613889°W	1563	Country house, formerly abbot's house. Extended 1814–20.	
Little Moreton Hall	Southwest of Congleton	53.1272°N 2.2518°W	15th century	One of Britain's finest timber-framed moated manor houses.	
Crewe Hall	Crewe Green	53.0827°N 2.3999°W	1615–36	Built for Sir Randolph Crewe, extended in the late 18th century and extensively restored after a fire in 1866. Considered to be one of the two finest Jacobean houses in Cheshire.	
Lyme Hall	Disley	53.3381°N 2.0547°W	c. 1570 with later additions	The largest house in Cheshire, built for the Legh family.	
Delves Hall	Doddington	53.0197°N 2.4356°W	1364	Fortified tower built by Sir John Delves.	Delves Hall, Doddington
Doddington Hall	Doddington	53.0148°N 2.4342°W	1777–98	Built for Revd Sir Thomas Broughton in neoclassical style.	
Golden Gates, Eaton Hall	Eaton Park	53.1404°N 2.8791°W	18th century, c. 1880	The central pair of gates (Golden Gates) and the adjacent screen railings are by Robert and John Davies, 18th century. Side gates, screens and lodges by Alfred Waterhouse, c. 1880.	
Farndon Bridge	Farndon	53.083373°N 2.879820°W	1339	Crosses the River Dee and the England-Wales border between the villages of Farndon and Holt.	
Gawsworth Old Hall	Gawsworth	53.2238°N 2.1638°W	1480, remodelled 1701	Partly timber framed, partly in brick, for the Fitton family.	
Old Rectory	Gawsworth	53.2240°N 2.1667°W	15th–16th century	Timber framed with the hall open to the roof. North wing added 1872. Originally a rectory, now a private house.	Gawsworth Old Rectory
Belmont Hall	Great Budworth	53.3011°N 2.5198°W	1755	Country house by James Gibbs; now a school.	Belmont Hall
Halton Castle	Halton	53.3331°N 2.6957°W	c. 1070	Castle on a sandstone outcrop. Now a ruin.	
Haslington Hall	Haslington	53.1006°N 2.3776°W	1545 with later alterations	Timber-framed house built by Admiral Sir Francis Vernon.	
Ince Manor	Ince	53.2831°N 2.8270°W	Late 13th century and later	Former monastic grange. The hall and the monastery cottages remain.	
Lovell Telescope	Jodrell Bank Observatory, near Goostrey	53.237°N 2.30715°W	1952–57	When built, it was the largest steerable dish radio telescope in the world.	
Lymm Cross	Lymm	53.3811°N 2.4776°W	17th century	Restored 1897.	
Crown Hotel	Nantwich	53.0673°N 2.5226°W	1580s	Timber framed inn built after the fire of 1583. Now a public house and hotel.	
Churche's Mansion	Nantwich	53.0655°N 2.5144°W	1577	Timber framed mansion house. Pevsner describes it as "an outstanding piece of decorated half-timber architecture".	
Peckforton Castle	Peckforton	53.1175°N 2.6990°W	1844–50	Country house built in the style of a medieval castle by Anthony Salvin for John Tollemache, 1st Baron Tollemache. Now a hotel.	
Stable Block	Peover Hall	53.2573°N 2.3418°W	1654	A gift from Mrs Ellen Mainwaring to her son Thomas. Elaborate screens to stalls.	
Norton Priory	Near Runcorn	53.3423°N 2.6799°W	13th century and later	A priory, then an abbey and later a country house. Now a ruin and a museum.	
Gatehouse	Saighton	53.1503°N 2.8342°W	c. 1489	Monastic grange for St Werburgh's Abbey, Chester. Only the gatehouse remains and this is now part of a school.	
Crosses	Sandbach	53.14402°N 2.36209°W	9th century	Pair of carved Anglo-Saxon crosses.	
Old Hall Hotel	Sandbach	53.144°N 2.363°W	1656	Large timber-framed building, now a hotel.	
Sutton Hall	Sutton Weaver	53.3067°N 2.6844°W	Late 15th or early 16th century, later extended	Internally are two superimposed great halls.	
Tabley House	Knutsford	53.2931°N 2.4225°W	1767	Palladian mansion by John Carr. Now owned by the University of Manchester.	
Tatton Hall	Knutsford	53.3304°N 2.3835°W	1791; completed 19th century	Neoclassical country house.	
Utkinton Hall	Utkinton	53.1769°N 2.6705°W	Medieval core but most of it dates from the early 17th century	Large manor house for the Done family.	
Town Hall	Warrington	53.3897°N 2.5997°W	1750	House for Thomas Patten by James Gibbs. Pevsner describes it as "the finest house of its date in south Lancashire". The detached service wings are also listed at Grade I.	
Winnington Hall	Winnington	53.2686°N 2.5336°W	c.1600; 1775	Older wing timber framed; newer wing in stone by Samuel Wyatt.	

== See also ==
- Scheduled Monuments in Cheshire (pre-1066)
