= St Michael's Church, Baddiley =

Coordinates: 53.0489°N 2.5905°W

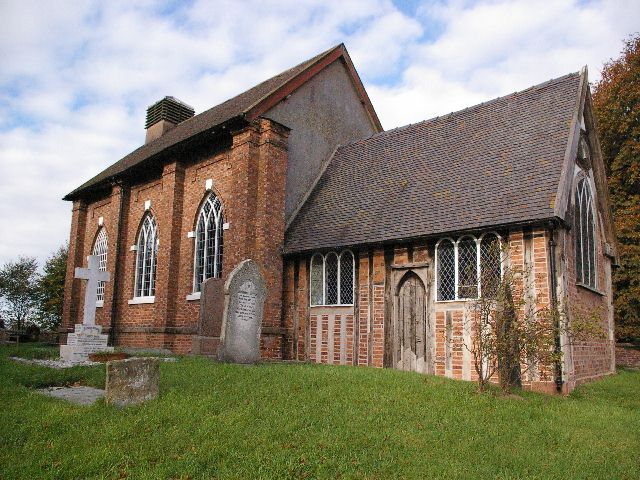
- St Michael's Church, Baddiley, from the southeast

- Location in Cheshire
- OS grid reference: SJ 604 502
- Location: Baddiley, Cheshire
- Country: England
- Denomination: Anglican
- Website: St Michael's Baddiley

History
- Status: Parish church
- Founded: 1308
- Dedication: Saint Michael

Architecture
- Functional status: Active
- Heritage designation: Grade I
- Designated: 12 January 1967
- Architectural type: Church
- Style: Gothic
- Groundbreaking: 1308
- Completed: 1811

Specifications
- Materials: Chancel timber-framed with brick infill; nave timber framing encased in brick; tiled roof

Administration
- Province: York
- Diocese: Chester
- Archdeaconry: Macclesfield
- Deanery: Nantwich
- Parish: Baddiley, Wrenbury & Burleydam

Clergy
- Vicar: Revd Amanda Pike

St Michael's Church is in the civil parish of Baddiley, Cheshire, England. It is recorded in the National Heritage List for England as a designated Grade I listed building. The church lies at the end of a lane near to Baddiley Hall, formerly the home of the Mainwaring family. It dates from the early 14th century. The nave and chancel are divided by a pre-Reformation screen and tympanum. The church is one of a 'handful' of timber-framed churches remaining in the country. It continues to be an active Anglican parish church in the diocese of Chester, the archdeaconry of Macclesfield and the deanery of Nantwich. Its benefice is combined with those of St Mary's and St Michael's Church, Burleydam and St Margaret's Church, Wrenbury.

== History ==
The church is first documented in 1308, though there may have been a church on the site before then. In 1811 the nave, other than the west gable, was encased in brick. In 2003–2004 repairs were carried out to the timber framework, the south door and the external brickwork of the chancel.

It is the last resting place of Helen Edwards née Macfarlane, the first translator from German into English of The Communist Manifesto.

== Architecture ==
=== Exterior ===
The plan of the church is simple consisting of a three-bay nave and a narrower lower chancel with a vestry to its north. In the west wall is an inset porch. The timber framing of the chancel is now infilled with brick which has replaced the original wattle and daub. Its north and south walls feature close studding with no middle rail. In the centre of the south wall is a Gothic wooden door flanked by three-light windows. The lean-to vestry is on the north side. The east wall has a three-light window with a small trefoil window above it. The nave has three three-light windows with Gothic heads in the north and south walls. The west wall has pairs of brick pilasters flanking the porch, which contains side seats. On the apex of the gable is a louvred bell turret, containing two bells of 122 pounds (55 kg) and 170 pounds (77 kg).

=== Interior ===
The nave and chancel are divided by a pre-Reformation screen and tympanum, which is unusual in Cheshire. The screen is of plain uprights and Richards describes the tympanum as one of the most colourful of its kind in England. On it is the date 1663 and in the middle are the royal arms of Charles II above the coat of arms of the Mainwarings. On each side of these are two panels containing the Ten Commandments, the Creed and the Lord's Prayer. the coat of arms was restored in 2007.

The nave roof is medieval and of camber beam construction. The altar rails are dated 1701. At the west end is a Georgian gallery and in the body of the church are box pews and a three-decker pulpit. In the chancel is a large monument to Sir Thomas Mainwaring who died in 1726, which is decorated with putti and the family arms. At gallery level are two wall panels which record the wills of benefactors who left money to the poor of the parish. The parish registers begin in 1597 and the churchwardens' accounts in 1636. The font, which is shown in a print of the church dated 1806, marks the location of the original entrance before the porch was built in the west wall.

== Present activities ==
Anglican services are held regularly in the church.

== See also ==
- Grade I listed buildings in Cheshire East
- Grade I listed churches in Cheshire
- Listed buildings in Baddiley
