= Grade I listed buildings in Cheshire East =

List of Grade I listed historic buildings in the Cheshire East unitary authority

There are over 9,000 Grade I listed buildings in England. This page is a list of these buildings in the unitary authority of Cheshire East.

== Listed buildings ==
Name	Location	Type	Completed (Note: The date given is the date used by Historic England as significant for the initial building or that of an important part in the structure's description.)	Date designated	Grid ref. (Note: The grid reference is based on the British national grid reference system, sometimes known as OSGB36, used by the Ordnance Survey.) Geo-coordinates	Notes	Entry number (Note: The "List Entry Number" is a unique number assigned to each listed building and scheduled monument by Historic England.)	Image
Church of St Mary the Virgin	Acton	Parish church	13th century	12 January 1967	SJ6317353088; 53°04′24″N 2°32′59″W		1330112	Church of St Mary the Virgin More images
Dorfold Hall	Dorfold Park, Acton	Country house	1616	10 June 1952	SJ6357052508; 53°04′06″N 2°32′37″W		1312869	Dorfold Hall More images
Adlington Hall	Adlington	Moat	1505	25 July 1952	SJ9046280471; 53°19′15″N 2°08′36″W		1234130	Adlington Hall More images
Chorley Old Hall	Alderley Edge	Cruck house	c.1330	10 September 1959	SJ8375078129; 53°17′59″N 2°14′38″W		1234539	Chorley Old Hall More images
Cruck barn approximately 100 yards to west of Arley Hall	Arley Hall, Aston By Budworth	Barn	Early 16th century	5 March 1959	SJ6745380896; 53°19′25″N 2°29′19″W		1329696	Cruck barn approximately 100 yards to west of Arley Hall More images
Church of St James	Audlem	Church	Late 13th century	12 January 1967	SJ6600443655; 52°59′20″N 2°30′23″W		1136872	Church of St James More images
Moss Hall	Audlem	Manor house	Early 17th century	10 June 1952	SJ6554944060; 52°59′33″N 2°30′48″W		1138519	Moss Hall More images
Church of St Michael	Baddiley	Parish church	1308	12 January 1967	SJ6051250344; 53°02′55″N 2°35′21″W		1138586	Church of St Michael More images
The Church of St Bertoline	Barthomley	Parish church	12th century	12 January 1967	SJ7676152378; 53°04′04″N 2°20′49″W		1330063	The Church of St Bertoline More images
Brereton Hall	Brereton Green, Brereton	Country house	1585	6 June 1952	SJ7812664855; 53°10′48″N 2°19′38″W		1229329	Brereton Hall More images
Highfields	Buerton	Country house	1615	10 June 1952	SJ6749040988; 52°57′54″N 2°29′03″W		1330162	Highfields More images
The Church of St Boniface	Bunbury	Parish church	14th century	12 January 1967	SJ5691258087; 53°07′05″N 2°38′38″W		1138626	The Church of St Boniface More images
The Chapel of Saint Nicholas	Cholmondeley Park, Cholmondeley	Chapel	Late 15th century	12 January 1967	SJ5446451638; 53°03′35″N 2°40′46″W		1138593	The Chapel of Saint Nicholas More images
Church of St Peter	Congleton	Parish church	1740–42	28 July 1950	SJ8595462760; 53°09′41″N 2°12′36″W		1330322	Church of St Peter More images
Crewe Hall	Crewe Hall Park, Crewe Green	Country house	1615–36	20 January 1975	SJ7330454021; 53°04′57″N 2°23′55″W		1138666	Crewe Hall More images
Combermere Abbey	Combermere Park, Dodcott cum Wilkesley	Country house	Early 16th century	10 June 1952	SJ5872844122; 52°59′33″N 2°36′54″W	Combermere Abbey incorporates the remains of a Cistercian monastery, founded in 1133. The monastic core is believed to represent the Abbot's House, a timber-framed building with a hammerbeam roof whose timbers have been dated to 1502; the building is thought to have been remodelled not long before the abbey's dissolution in 1538. It became the country house of the Cotton family, who redesigned it in 1563. The building was remodelled and extended in the 1790s, and further extended and Gothicised in around 1814–21, with the addition of cement render, castellations and windows with pointed arches. Parts of the later additions were removed or reduced in the 1970s.	1136900	Combermere Abbey More images
Delves Hall	Doddington Park, Doddington	House	Early/mid-17th century	12 January 1967	SJ7087347025; 53°01′10″N 2°26′03″W		1330165	Delves Hall More images
Doddington Hall	Doddington Park, Doddington	Country house	1777–90	10 June 1952	SJ7093946474; 53°00′52″N 2°26′00″W		1136840	Doddington Hall More images
Woodhey Chapel	Woodhey, Faddiley	Loggia	Early 17th century	12 January 1967	SJ5732452792; 53°04′13″N 2°38′13″W		1312896	Woodhey Chapel More images
Church of St James	Gawsworth	Church	15th century	14 April 1967	SJ8901069688; 53°13′26″N 2°09′53″W		1139497	Church of St James More images
Gawsworth Old Hall	Gawsworth	Country house	15th century	25 July 1952	SJ8916369647; 53°13′25″N 2°09′44″W		1139500	Gawsworth Old Hall More images
The Old Rectory	Gawsworth	House	Late 16th century	25 July 1952	SJ8897769777; 53°13′29″N 2°09′54″W		1139496	The Old Rectory More images
Sir Bernard Lovell Telescope, Jodrell Bank Laboratory	Jodrell Bank, Goostrey	Radio telescope	1952–57	13 July 1988	SJ7950071099; 53°14′10″N 2°18′26″W	This telescope is situated within the wider Jodrell Bank Observatory, Cheshire's only UNESCO World Heritage Site - designated in July 2019.	1221685	Sir Bernard Lovell Telescope, Jodrell Bank Laboratory More images
Haslington Hall	Haslington	Country house	Late 15th century	10 June 1952	SJ7483655933; 53°05′59″N 2°22′33″W		1136283	Haslington Hall More images
Church of St Luke	Holmes Chapel	Parish church	c.1430	14 February 1967	SJ7621867274; 53°12′06″N 2°21′22″W		1231322	Church of St Luke More images
Brook Street Chapel	Knutsford	Unitarian chapel	1689	18 January 1949	SJ7542978361; 53°18′06″N 2°22′12″W	This is a brick building with a stone-slate roof, expressed externally in two storeys, but interiorly is a single cell. The chapel was attended by Mrs Gaskell, who is buried in the churchyard. It is in use as a Unitarian chapel.	1388306	Brook Street Chapel More images
Lyme Park	Lyme Park Country Park, Lyme Handley	Country house	c.1570	17 November 1983	SJ9646782358; 53°20′16″N 2°03′11″W		1231685	Lyme Park More images
Church of St James and St Paul	Marton	Church	c.1370	14 April 1967	SJ8502267993; 53°12′31″N 2°13′27″W		1139465	Church of St James and St Paul More images
Church of St Wilfrid	Mobberley	Church	14th–15th century	5 March 1959	SJ7903580185; 53°19′04″N 2°18′53″W		1139554	Church of St Wilfrid More images
St Mary's Church	Nantwich	Parish church	14th century	19 April 1948	SJ6521052324; 53°04′01″N 2°31′14″W	St Mary's is a large cruciform parish church in sandstone, sometimes referred to as the "cathedral of South Cheshire". Mainly in decorated style with later perpendicular additions, it was restored in 1854–61 by George Gilbert Scott. The exterior has an octagonal tower; the interior has an unusual stone lierne-vault above the chancel, carved oak canopied choir stalls (late 14th century), a perpendicular stone pulpit and a later wooden example (1601). The church was used as a prison during the Civil War.	1206059	St Mary's Church More images
Churche's Mansion	Hospital Street, Nantwich	House	1577	19 April 1948	SJ6562752150; 53°03′56″N 2°30′52″W	Churche's Mansion is a timber-framed, four-gabled black-and-white mansion house by Thomas Clease. The two storeys and attics all have overhangs; the corbels in the eaves are decorated with carvings of animals. The upper storeys have decorative panels. Originally the residence of the Churche family, the mansion has housed a school and later a restaurant; it is now a shop.	1039605	Churche's Mansion More images
Crown Inn, 24 & 26 High Street	Nantwich	Assembly rooms	c. 1584	19 April 1948	SJ6507252357; 53°04′02″N 2°31′22″W	The Crown Inn is a timber-framed, three-storey black-and-white inn rebuilt shortly after the 1583 fire, and formerly the principal inn of the town. The street-facing front is flat and features close studding with a middle rail, lacking ornamental panels. There are slight overhangs at each storey, with carved brackets. The second floor has unusual continuous windows along the front; it was originally a single gallery, which was partitioned in the 18th century. An 18th-century assembly room lies at the rear. It was used as a place of worship during the Civil War.	1330054	Crown Inn, 24 & 26 High Street More images
Church of St Mary	Nether Alderley	Church	14th century	14 April 1967	SJ8417276133; 53°16′54″N 2°14′15″W		1138849	Church of St Mary More images
Church of St Mary	Newbold Astbury	Church	12th century	14 February 1967	SJ8462361527; 53°09′01″N 2°13′48″W		1138740	Church of St Mary More images
Little Moreton Hall	Odd Rode	Country house	Early 15th century–c.1600	6 June 1952	SJ8325158924; 53°07′37″N 2°15′01″W		1161988	Little Moreton Hall More images
Peckforton Castle	Peckforton	Castle	1844–50	10 June 1952	SJ5332658084; 53°07′03″N 2°41′51″W		1135729	Peckforton Castle More images
Church of St Lawrence	Peover Hall Park, Peover Superior	Church	1456	5 March 1959	SJ7720773517; 53°15′28″N 2°20′30″W		1139274	Church of St Lawrence More images
The Old Stable Block, Peover Hall	Peover Hall Park, Peover Superior	Stable	1654	5 September 1959	SJ7733473400; 53°15′25″N 2°20′23″W		1335855	The Old Stable Block, Peover Hall More images
Church of St Christopher	Pott Shrigley	Church	15th century	14 April 1967	SJ9444879208; 53°18′34″N 2°05′00″W		1277234	Church of St Christopher More images
Church of St Peter	Prestbury	Church	Early–mid-13th century	14 April 1967	SJ9006476931; 53°17′20″N 2°08′57″W		1221919	Church of St Peter More images
Church of St Mary	Rostherne	Church	14th century	5 March 1959	SJ7426783691; 53°20′57″N 2°23′12″W		1230301	Church of St Mary More images
Old Hall Hotel	Sandbach	House	1656	11 August 1950	SJ7596860668; 53°08′32″N 2°21′34″W		1310849	Old Hall Hotel More images
Sandbach Crosses	Sandbach	Cross	Early–mid-9th century	11 August 1950	SJ7587760825; 53°08′37″N 2°21′38″W		1159937	Sandbach Crosses More images
Church of St Peter (at Tabley House)	Tabley Inferior	Church	c.1714	5 March 1959	SJ7249077766; 53°17′45″N 2°24′46″W		1329685	Church of St Peter (at Tabley House) More images
Tabley House	Tabley Inferior	House	1760–67	5 March 1959	SJ7255977752; 53°17′45″N 2°24′42″W		1115424	Tabley House More images
Tatton Hall	Tatton Park, Tatton	Country house	1780–91	5 March 1959	SJ7449081566; 53°19′48″N 2°22′59″W		1329670	Tatton Hall More images
Church of St Bartholomew	Wilmslow	Church	1898	30 March 1951	SJ8480381492; 53°19′47″N 2°13′42″W		1222475	Church of St Bartholomew More images
Mark II (radio telescope)	Jodrell Bank Observatory	Radio telescope	1964	10 July 2017	SJ7981570810; 53°14′02″N 2°18′14″W		1443087	Mark II (radio telescope) More images

== See also ==
- Grade I listed buildings in Cheshire
  - Grade I listed buildings in Cheshire West and Chester
  - Grade I listed buildings in Cheshire East
  - Grade I listed buildings in Warrington
  - Grade I listed buildings in Halton (borough)
- Grade II* listed buildings in Cheshire

== Sources ==
- Hartwell, Clare; Hyde, Matthew; Hubbard, Edward; Pevsner, Nikolaus (2011) [1971], Cheshire, The Buildings of England, New Haven and London: Yale University Press, ISBN 978-0-300-17043-6
