= Listed buildings in Audlem =

Audlem is a civil parish in Cheshire East, England. It contains 25 buildings that are recorded in the National Heritage List for England as designated listed buildings. Of these, two are listed at Grade I, the highest grade, one is listed at Grade II*, the middle grade, and the others are at Grade II. The major settlement in the parish is the village of Audlem. In the village the listed buildings include churches and cemetery chapels, a former grammar school, a hotel, houses, and a memorial lamp standard. In the surrounding countryside the listed buildings include country houses, farmhouses, farm buildings, and a road bridge. Running through the parish is the Shropshire Union Canal, and the listed structures associated with this are bridges, mileposts and a lock keeper's cottage.

== Key ==
Grade	Criteria
I	Buildings of exceptional interest, sometimes considered to be internationally important
II*	Particularly important buildings of more than special interest
II	Buildings of national importance and special interest

== Buildings ==
Name and location	Photograph	Date	Notes	Grade
St James' Church; 52.9891°N 2.5079°W		Late 13th century	The church is built in sandstone, and is mainly in Perpendicular style. Additions and alterations were made in 1885–86 by Lynam and Rickman. The church consists of a nave with a clerestory, aisles, a southwest porch, a chancel, and a northwest tower with battlements and pinnacles.	I
Holmes Farmhouse; 52.98817°N 2.50230°W	—	16th or 17th century	A wing was added to the farmhouse in the later 17th century, and in the 19th century there were further alterations and additions. It is constructed in timber framing with brick infill and in brick, and it has a tiled roof. The house is in two storeys, and the windows are casements. Inside the house is an inglenook with a bressumer.	II
Moss Hall; 52.99279°N 2.51471°W		1616	A timber-framed manor house with rendered infill and brick on a stone plinth. It has a tiled roof, and is in two storeys with attics. The house has an E-shaped plan, and a nearly-symmetrical entrance front of five bays. The central bay forms a gabled two-storey porch, and the first floor of the house is jettied. The windows are casements.	I
Swanbach Farmhouse; 52.97679°N 2.51428°W		Early 17th century	The farmhouse is timber-framed with brick infill and a tiled roof. An additional two-bay wing was added to the right in the 19th century. The original part is jettied at the first floor and at the attic. It contains canted bay windows in the ground and upper floors, above which is a two-light window. In the later part is a central gabled porch flanked by oriel windows. In the upper floor are half-dormers.	II
Old Grammar School; 52.98855°N 2.50634°W		1647–55	The former school is built in red brick on a stone plinth, with blue brick diapering, stone dressings, and a slate roof. It is in two and three storeys, and has a four-bay front. The windows, some of which are dormers, are mullioned or mullioned and transomed. In 1770 a master's house was added to the right. This is also in brick, is gabled, and has a three-bay front.	II*
Stable building, Corbrook Court; 52.99972°N 2.50068°W	—	17th century	The block is built in timber framing with brick infill and brick with a slate roof. Alterations and additions were made in the 19th century. It contains doorways of various types and a casement window.	II
Farm building, Holmes Farm; 52.98799°N 2.50194°W	—	17th century	The farm building is constructed in timber framing with brick infill, and in brick. It has a tiled roof, and is in a single storey with a loft. The building contains doorways, and in the left gable end is a stone stairway leading up to a first floor loft doorway.	II
The Lymes; 52.98773°N 2.49883°W	—	17th century	The main part of the house dates from the 19th century, with a 17th-century wing at the rear giving it a T-shaped plan. The house is in rendered brick with a slate roof, and has two storeys. On the entrance front are two bow windows, the other windows being sashes. On the garden front are two bay windows, one with French windows.	II
Rose Cottage; 52.99326°N 2.50531°W	—	17th century	The cottage was expanded in the 19th and in the 20th centuries. It is built in timber framing on a brick plinth with brick infill, and in brick, and has a tiled roof. It is in two storeys, the lower storey being timber-framed and the upper storey in brick painted to resemble timber framing. On the front is a gabled porch, and there is a single-storey addition to the right. The windows are casements.	II
Market House; 52.98890°N 2.50818°W		18th century	This originated as a market hall. It is built in stone with a tiled roof. On the front are two rows of four Tuscan pillars, and a central pedimented gable.	II
19 Stafford Street; 52.98955°N 2.50669°W		Mid- to late 18th century	The house, divided into three at the time of listing, is in whitewashed brick with a plain tile roof. It has three storeys and a symmetrical three-bay entrance front, with a central door with a pedimental overdoor supported on brackets, canted bay windows to left and right and projecting wings with hipped roofs outside those. There are projecting horizontal bands of brick between the floors.	II
28 Stafford Street; 52.989629°N 2.507335°W		Mid- to late 18th century	The house is in brick with a tile roof. It has three storeys and a symmetrical three-bay front. In the centre is a cast iron porchway. The windows are sashes. On the right side of the house are two canted bay windows.	II
Crown Hotel; 52.98891°N 2.50865°W		Late 18th to early 19th century	The former hotel, now house, is in pebbledashed brick with a tiled roof. It is in three storeys and has a five-bay entrance front. A sandstone porch protrudes from the central bay, which is flanked by pilaster buttresses and has a parapet with ball finials. The windows are sashes.	II
Beech Tree House; 52.98839°N 2.49980°W	—	Early 19th century	A rendered brick house with stone dressings and a slate roof. It is in two storeys and has a symmetrical three-bay front. The central doorway is flanked by fluted pilasters, and it has an open pediment with a fanlight. The windows are sashes.	II
Fields Farmhouse; 52.98202°N 2.50217°W	—	Early 19th century	The brick farmhouse has a tiled roof, and a symmetrical three-bay front. In the centre is a doorway with a Neoclassical surround consisting of fluted pilasters and an open pediment with a fanlight. The windows are sashes.	II
Greenbank; 52.98691°N 2.51119°W	—	Early 19th century	The house is in rendered brick with a hipped slate roof. It has two storeys and a symmetrical three-bay front. The centre is bowed, and has a verandah with wooden columns. Flanking this are two French windows, the windows in the upper floor being casements. On the right side is a canted bay window.	II
Milepost; 52.97740°N 2.50939°W		Early 19th century	The milepost stands to the east of Audlem Lock No. 5 on the Shropshire Union Canal. It is in cast iron, and consists of a circular post with a domed top and a plate divided into three panels. The panels are inscribed with the distances in miles to Nantwich Autherley Junction and to Norbury Junction.	II
Milepost; 52.98730°N 2.50972°W	—	Early 19th century	The milepost stands to the east of the Shropshire Union Canal. It is in cast iron, and consists of a circular post with a domed top and a plate. The plate is inscribed with the distances in miles to Nantwich Autherley Junction and to Norbury Junction.	II
Bridge No. 74; 52.96651°N 2.50708°W		c. 1827–30	The accommodation bridge crossing the Shropshire Union Canal was designed by Thomas Telford. It is in brick with a stone band and copings. The bridge consists of a single elliptical arch, and it has a solid parapet and piers.	II
Bridge No. 75; 52.97035°N 2.50860°W		c. 1827–30	The accommodation bridge crossing the Shropshire Union Canal was designed by Thomas Telford. It is in brick with a stone band and copings. The bridge consists of a single elliptical arch, and it has a solid parapet and piers.	II
Wharf Cottage; 52.98902°N 2.51163°W		c. 1828	The cottage stands to the east of Audlem Wharf, and is a variant of Thomas Telford's standard design. It is built in brick with a slate roof, and has a large polygonal bay window with a hipped roof facing the canal. To the right of this is an extension containing a lobby. The windows are casements.	II
Grey's Bridge; 52.98416°N 2.51250°W	—	Early to mid-19th century	The bridge carries Green Lane over a brook. It is built in brick with ashlar dressings, and consists of a single span. At each end are curving walls that terminate in square piers.	II
Baptist Chapel; 52.98895°N 2.50288°W		1840	The Baptist chapel is built in brick with a slate roof. The sides are divided into five bays by rendered brick pilasters, and each bay contains a round-headed window. The west end has three bays with a protruding porch in the middle bay. To the left is a later baptistry with a three-bay front and a porch with cast iron Tuscan pillars.	II
Cemetery chapels 52.99026°N 2.50975°W	—	1873–74	The two chapels were designed by Thomas Bower. Between them is a range of porches, an archway, and a bell tower. They are built in red brick and are decorated with blue brick diapering and bands of encaustic tiles both externally and internally. The chapels are roofed in alternating bands of red and blue slates.	II
Memorial lamp standard 52.98877°N 2.50832°W		c. 1877	Erected as a memorial to Richard Baker Bellyse, the cast iron lamp standard is on a granite base. At the base of the standard are four lion paw feet, above which is circular portion, then four half-columns ending in a Corinthian capital, on which is a lantern.	II

== See also ==
- Listed buildings in Hankelow
- Listed buildings in Buerton
- Listed buildings in Adderley
- Listed buildings in Dodcott cum Wilkesley
- Listed buildings in Newhall
