= St James' Church, Audlem =

Coordinates: 52.9891°N 2.5079°W

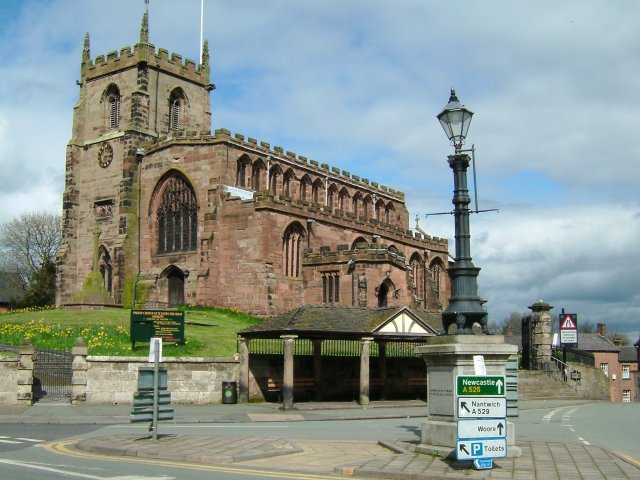
- St James' Church, Audlem, from the southwest

- Location in Cheshire
- OS grid reference: SJ 659 437
- Location: Audlem, Cheshire
- Country: England
- Denomination: Anglican
- Website: St James, Audlem

History
- Status: Parish church

Architecture
- Functional status: Active
- Heritage designation: Grade I
- Designated: 12 January 1967
- Architect(s): Lynam and Rickman (19th century additions)
- Architectural type: Church
- Style: Gothic
- Completed: 1856

Specifications
- Materials: Red sandstone

Administration
- Province: York
- Diocese: Chester
- Archdeaconry: Macclesfield
- Deanery: Nantwich
- Parish: Audlem

Clergy
- Rector: Revd Canon Helen Fiona Chantry

St James' Church is in the village of Audlem in south Cheshire, England. It is recorded in the National Heritage List for England as a designated Grade I listed building.

The church dates from the late 13th century with additions in the 19th century. It is an active Anglican parish church in the diocese of Chester, the archdeaconry of Macclesfield and the deanery of Nantwich. Its benefice is combined with those of St John, Doddington, and St Chad, Wybunbury. The church stands in an elevated position in the centre of the village.

== History ==
The church is not recorded in the Domesday Book and it is thought that the first building on the site was given by Thomas de Aldelim to the priory of St Thomas at Stafford in the reign of Edward I. After the dissolution of the monasteries the advowson was granted to the Bishop of Coventry and Lichfield. The church dates from the late 13th and early 14th centuries. In 1855–56 there were additions and alterations by Lynam and Rickman.

== Architecture ==
=== Exterior ===
The church stands on a small mound in the centre of the village. It is built of red sandstone ashlar with a lead roof. Its plan consists of a six-bay nave with an embattled clerestory, a tower at the northwest corner of the nave, a north aisle with a chapel at its east end, a narrower south aisle, a chancel and a south porch.

The church is approached through the south porch by 26 steps arranged in a semicircle. The south wall contains a former priest's doorway which has been walled up and its steps removed. The tower has on its west face a two-light window, above which is a pair of windows and above these is a circular clock. The belfry windows have two lights and are louvred. The top is embattled with pinnacles at the four corners.

=== Interior ===
The nave roof is camber beamed. The holy table and pulpit are Jacobean in style. A two-tier chandelier was donated to the church in 1755. Also in the church is a 13th-century chest. Two windows containing stained glass are by William Wailes. One of these was donated by Edward Barker in memory of his wife and was installed in 1859. In the south aisle (Nativity scenes from 1882) and in the north aisle (dated 1893) are windows by Kempe. Four memorial boards are present which are believed to have been painted by members of the Randle Holme family of Chester.

There is a ring of six bells, all cast in 1736 by Abel Rudhall of Gloucester, which were rehung in 1891. The parish registers begin in 1557. The two-manual organ was made by John Squire of London and restored in 1973 by Hawkins and Son of Walsall. In the 1990s it was moved from a side chapel to the west end of the north aisle.

== See also ==
- Grade I listed buildings in Cheshire East
- Grade I listed churches in Cheshire
- Listed buildings in Audlem
