= St Luke's Church, Holmes Chapel =

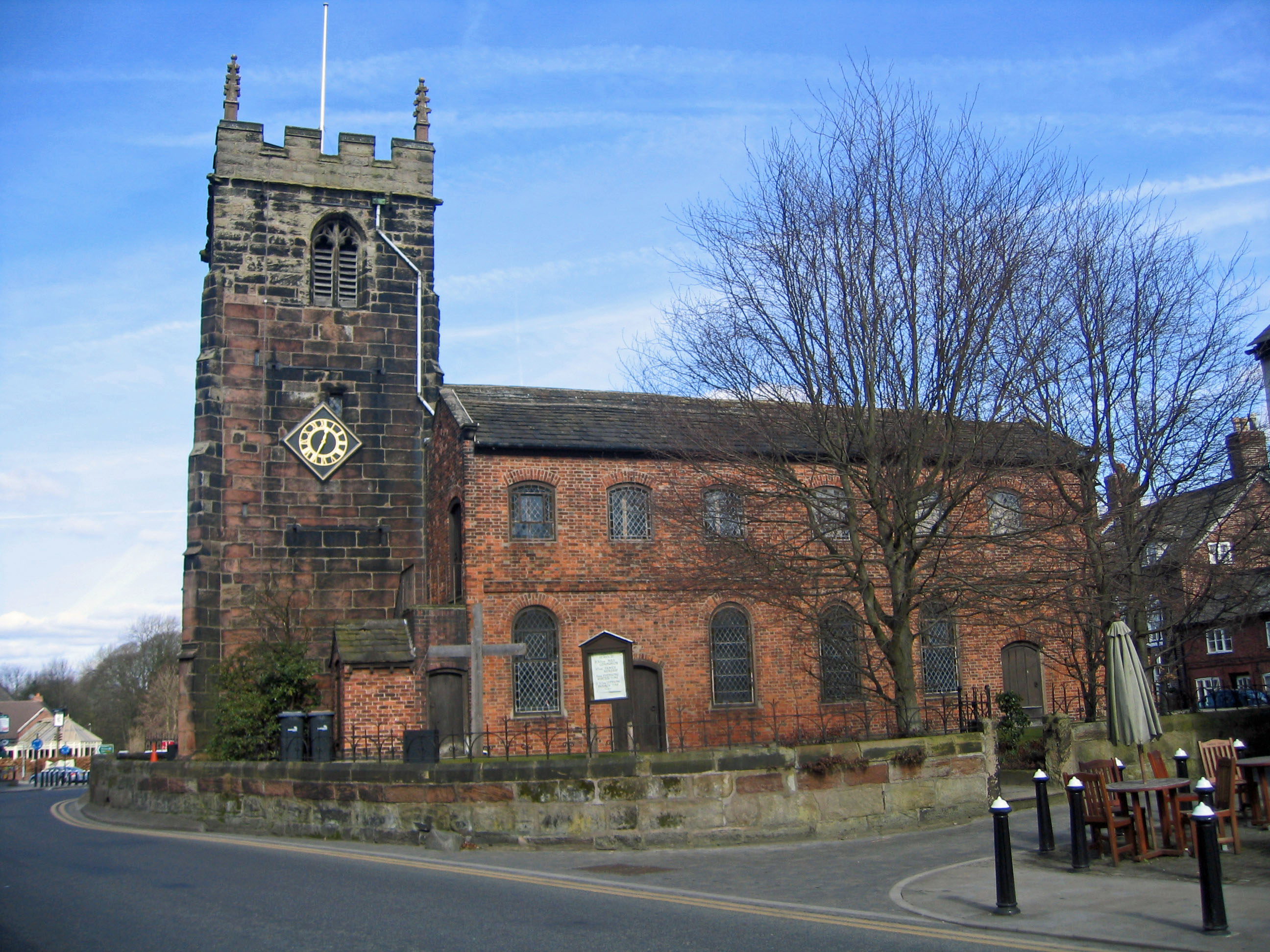
- St Luke's Church, Holmes Chapel, from the south

- Location in Cheshire
- 53.2020°N 2.3575°W
- OS grid reference: SJ 761 673
- Location: Holmes Chapel, Cheshire
- Country: England
- Denomination: Anglican
- Website: St Luke's, Holmes Chapel

History
- Status: Parish church
- Dedication: St Luke
- Consecrated: 1430

Architecture
- Functional status: Active
- Heritage designation: Grade I
- Designated: 14 February 1967
- Architectural type: Church
- Style: Gothic
- Completed: 1705

Specifications
- Materials: Tower sandstone Nave and chancel timber framed, enclosed in brick Welsh slate roof

Administration
- Province: York
- Diocese: Chester
- Archdeaconry: Macclesfield
- Deanery: Congleton
- Parish: Church Hulme

St Luke's Church is in the village of Holmes Chapel, Cheshire, England on the A50 road at its junction with the A535 road. The church is recorded in the National Heritage List for England as a designated Grade I listed building. It is an active Anglican parish church in the diocese of Chester, the archdeaconry of Macclesfield and the deanery of Congleton.

== History ==
There has been a church on the site since the 13th century. The present church originated about 1430 as a timber-framed building with a Perpendicular sandstone west tower. The nave and chancel were encased in brick in the early 18th century. Shortly afterwards a west gallery was installed as a gift from Thomas Hall. Renovations have taken place in 1839, 1931 and 1950.

== Architecture ==
=== Exterior ===
The tower is of sandstone and the nave and chancel are in brick, with a Welsh slate roof. The plan of the church consists of a four-bay nave with north and south aisles. The one-bay chancel has a lower roof and there is a vestry to its north. The tower has a west doorway above which is a two-light window. Above this is a small square ringers' window and belfry windows of two lights. The summit of the tower is embattled with gargoyles at each corner. On the north and south faces of the tower are diamond-shaped clock faces. The aisle windows are in two tiers with semicircular heads.

=== Interior ===
The timber roof was revealed when a later plaster ceiling was removed. This dates from the 15th century and is a combination of arch braced trusses with cambered tie beams. Oak panelled galleries dating from around 1705 are over the west end and the south aisle, the former containing the organ, and the latter box pews. A carved oak crest dated 1622 is near the communion rail. The stone font is dated 1890 and the oak pulpit is also from the 19th century. On the walls are wall memorials. The brass candelabrum, dated 1708, is the oldest in any church in Cheshire. The stained glass in the east window dates from 1921, and was designed by Horatio Walter Lonsdale. There are monuments in the church dated 1715, 1801, and 1836. The organ was built in 1851 by Richard Jackson and was rebuilt around 1900 by A. Young, and again in 1972 by L. Reeves. There is a ring of six bells, four of which by are Richard Sanders and date from 1709. The other two bells are dated 1858 and were cast by G. Mears of the Whitechapel Bell Foundry. The parish registers begin in 1613 and the churchwardens' accounts from 1812.

== External features ==
There is a churchyard extension that contains the war grave of a soldier of World War I.

== See also ==
- Grade I listed buildings in Cheshire East
- Grade I listed churches in Cheshire
- Listed buildings in Holmes Chapel
