= Audlem Baptist Church =

Coordinates: 52.98895°N 2.50288°W

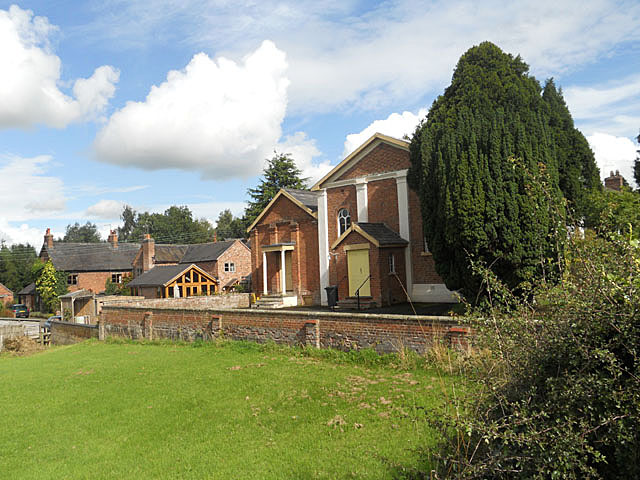
- Entrance front of Audlem Baptist Church with the baptistry on the left

- Location in Cheshire
- OS grid reference: SJ 663 436
- Location: Woore Road, Audlem, Cheshire
- Country: England
- Denomination: Baptist
- Website: Audlem Baptist Church

History
- Founded: 1840

Architecture
- Functional status: Active
- Heritage designation: Grade II
- Designated: 12 January 1967

Specifications
- Materials: Brick, slate roof

Audlem Baptist Church is in Woore Road, Audlem, Cheshire, England. It is an active Baptist church, and is recorded in the National Heritage List for England as a designated Grade II listed building.

== History ==
The church was built in 1840, and at a later date a baptistry was added on the north side. (Note: The church is orientated northwest-southeast. In this article the directions reflect the traditional liturgical orientation.)

== Architecture ==
The church is constructed in red brick with a slate roof, and is in one storey. The south front has five bays divided by rendered brick pilasters. Each bay contains a round-arched window, and above the central window is a rectangular date stone. At the east end are three blind bays divided by pilasters without rendering. The west end is the entrance front, and is in three bays separated by rendered pilasters. A flat-roofed porch projects from the central bay. The lateral bays each contains a round-headed window with two lights and a round light above. The baptistry is lower than the church. Its entrance front is also in three bays with brick pilasters. It has a central flat-roofed porch supported by slender cast iron Tuscan pillars.

== See also ==
- Listed buildings in Audlem

== Notes and references ==
Notes

Citations
