= St Bartholomew's Church, Wilmslow =

Coordinates: 53.3301°N 2.2296°W

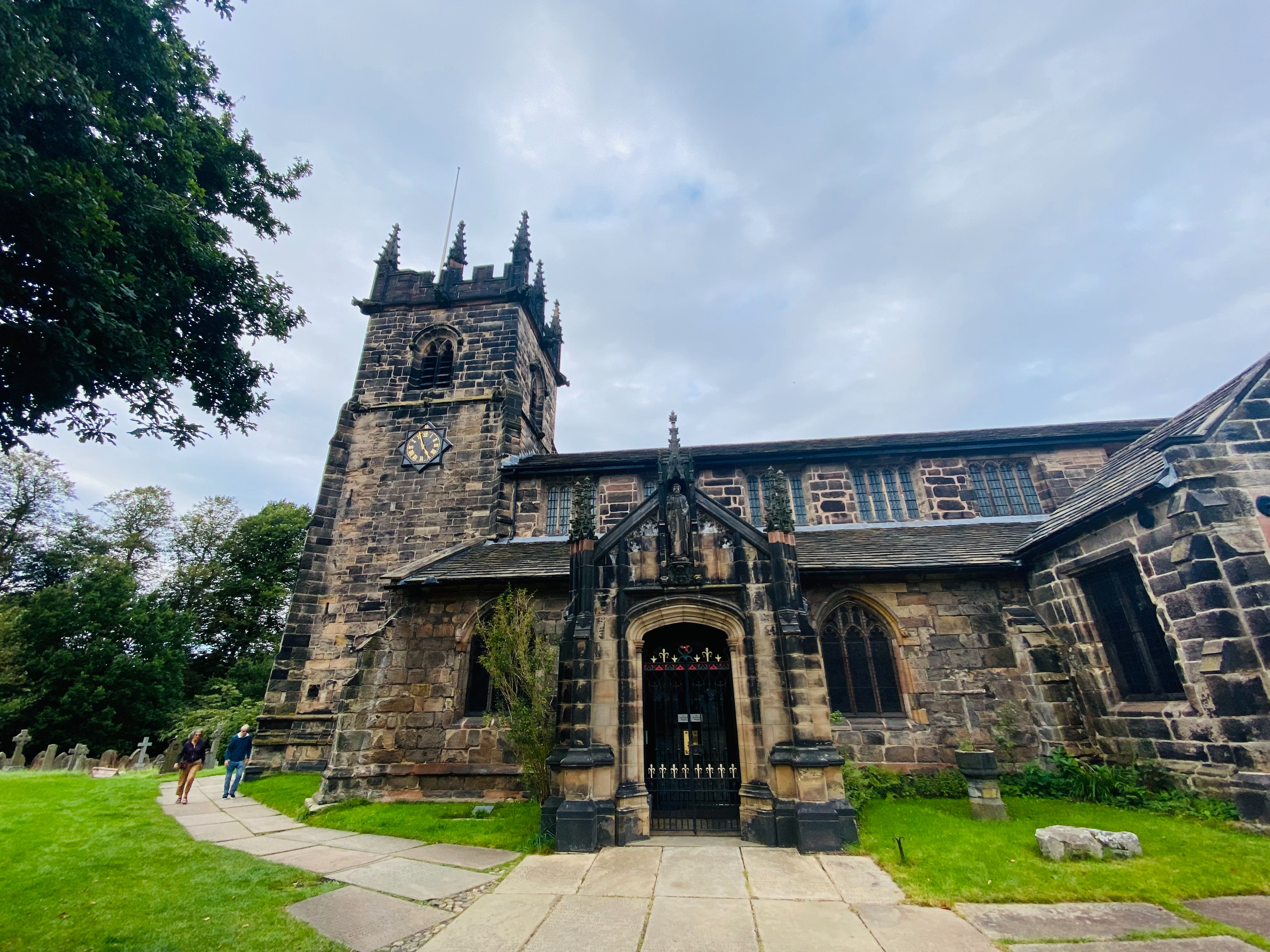
- St Bartholomew's Church, Wilmslow, from the south

- Location in Cheshire
- OS grid reference: SJ 848 814
- Location: Wilmslow, Cheshire
- Country: England
- Denomination: Anglican
- Website: wilmslowparish.co.uk

History
- Status: Parish church
- Dedication: Saint Bartholomew
- Consecrated: 16th century

Architecture
- Functional status: Active
- Heritage designation: Grade I
- Designated: 30 March 1951
- Architect(s): Brakspear, J. S. Crowther, Bodley and Garner
- Architectural type: Church
- Style: Gothic, Gothic Revival
- Completed: 1898

Specifications
- Materials: Buff sandstone Kerridge stone-slate roof

Administration
- Province: York
- Diocese: Chester
- Archdeaconry: Macclesfield
- Deanery: Knutsford
- Parish: Wilmslow

Clergy
- Rector: Revd Eddie Roberts

St Bartholomew's Church is in the town of Wilmslow, Cheshire, England. The church is recorded in the National Heritage List for England as a designated Grade I listed building. It is an active Anglican parish church in the diocese of Chester, the archdeaconry of Macclesfield and the deanery of Knutsford.

== History ==
The earliest documentary evidence of a church on the site is dated 1246. Nothing of this church remains but there is a crypt leading from the chancel which pre-dates the present church. Most of the church was built in the early 16th century also, though it is possible that the lower part of the tower dates from the 15th century. The Hawthorne Chapel was added to the south side of the church in 1700, replacing a former chantry dated 1520. There was a restoration in 1862–63 by W. H. Brakspear. In 1878, J. S. Crowther added the vestry and the south porch, and a clerestory was added to the chancel in 1898 by Bodley and Garner.

The parish registers begin in 1558 and the churchwardens' accounts date from 1585.

== Architecture ==
=== Exterior ===
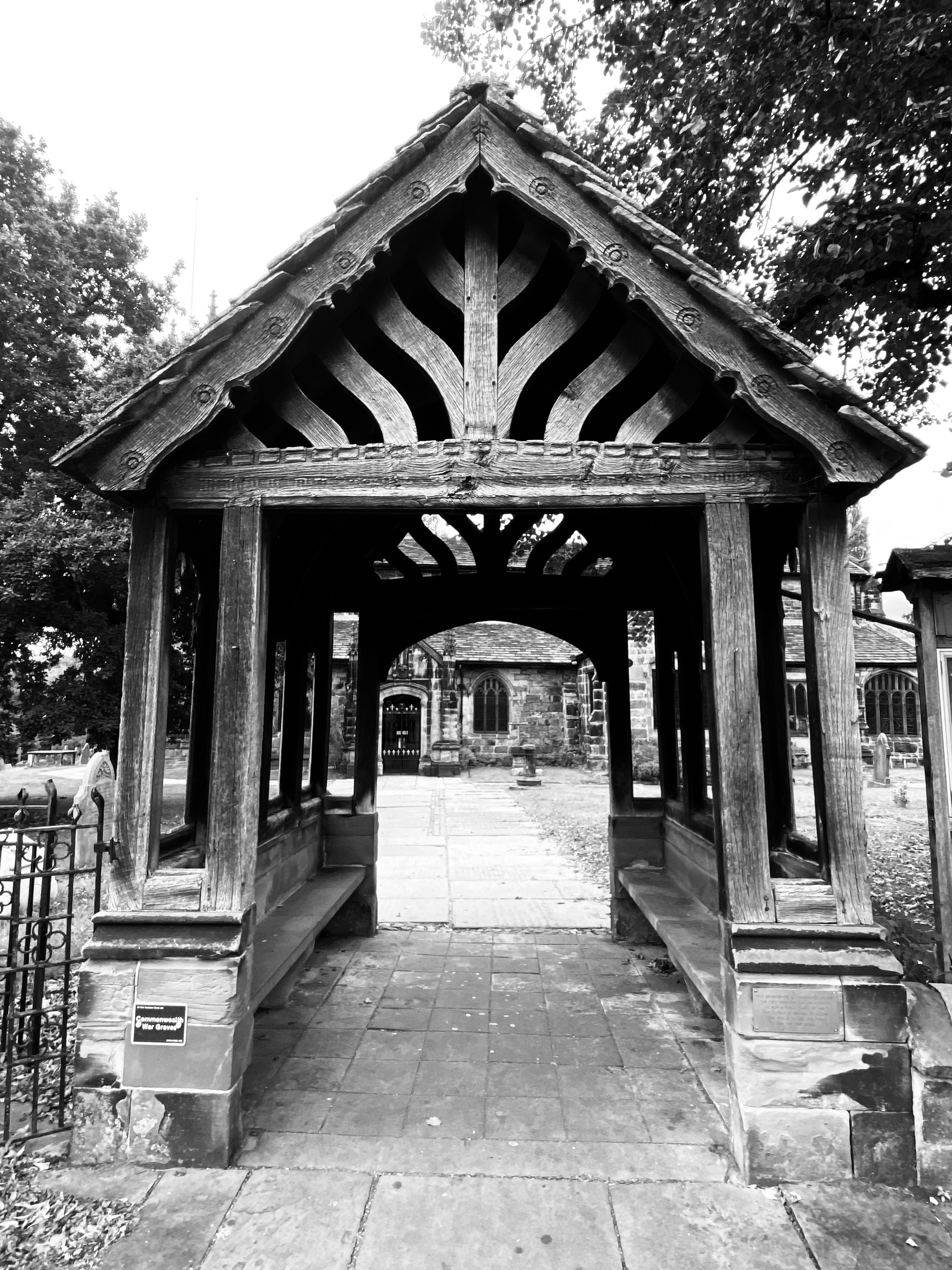
St Bartholomew's lychgate

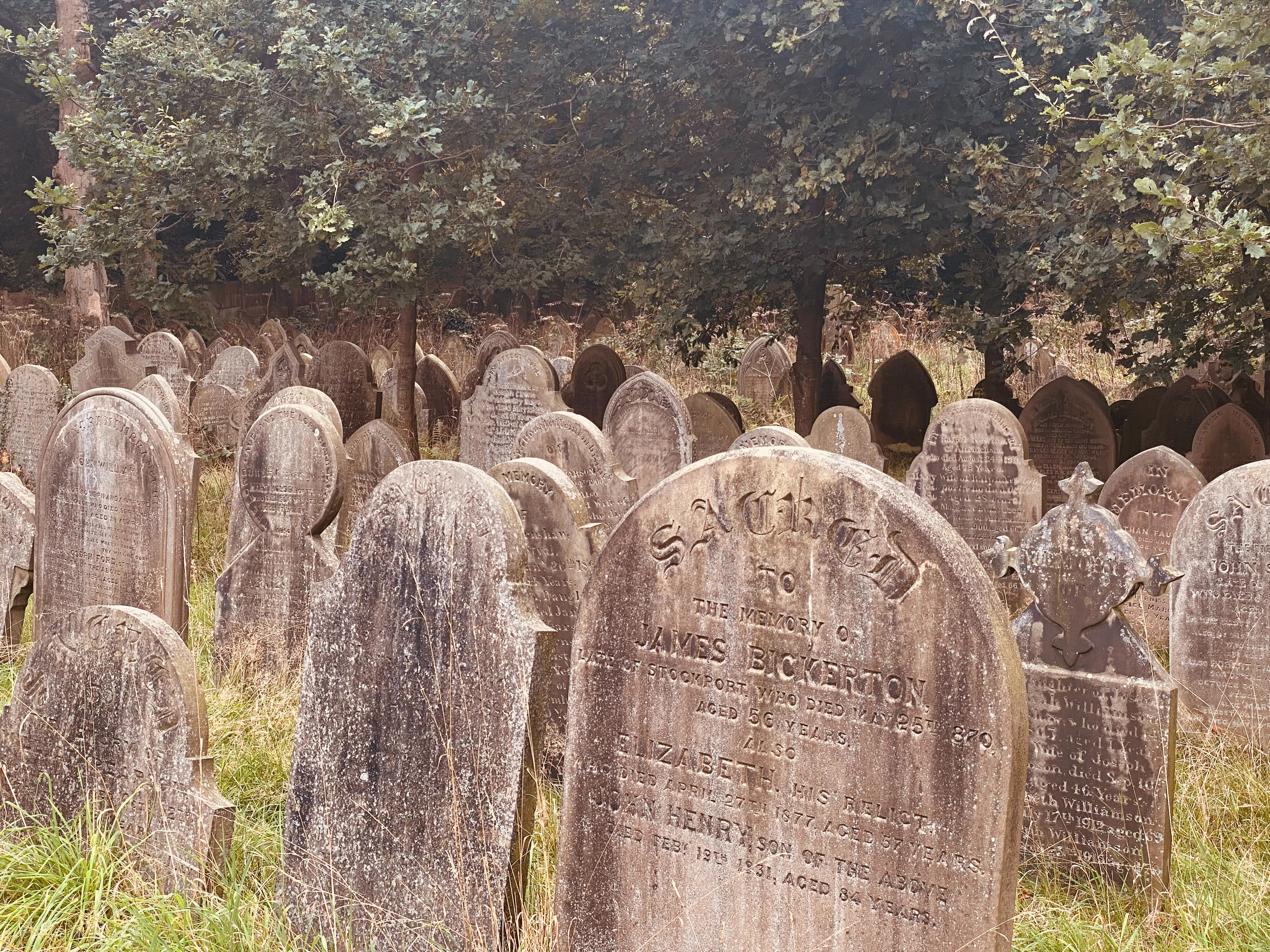
St Bartholomew's churchyard

The church is built from ashlar buff sandstone with a Kerridge stone-slate roof. The tower at the west end leads to a five-bay nave with north and south aisles, a chancel with chapels to the north and south, a vestry to the north of the north chapel, a south porch and the Hawthorne Chapel projecting from the south wall.

=== Interior ===
In the wall of the north aisle is an old aumbry. The chapel at the east end of the north aisle is the Trafford (formerly Jesus) Chapel and that at the east end of the south aisle is the Booth or Prescott Chapel. In the Booth Chapel is a large tomb to the memory of Captain John Worrall. The chapel formerly contained the tomb of George Booth of Dunham Massey and his wife Elizabeth but this was removed in the 1862–63 restoration. The Hawthorne Chapel contains some early 18th-century panelling and old seating.

In the chancel is a crypt chapel dating from around 1300 which is reached by a spiral staircase. It contains a triple sedilia. In the chancel floor is the oldest brass in Cheshire, dated 1460, in memory of Sir Robert del Booth and his wife Douce. The chancel contains the tomb of Henry Trafford, rector of Wilmslow from 1522, his effigy dressed in ecclesiastical robes. In the north wall of the chancel are two recesses containing red sandstone effigies. Only fragments of the ancient stained glass remain. Three windows dated 1920 were designed by Dearle and made by Morris and Company.

The two-manual organ was built in 1866 by Wadsworth, and rebuilt in 1897 by Alexander Young. It was rebuilt again in 1961 by Smethurst. The organ underwent a comprehensive restoration in late 2017 after £250,000 was raised. It was upgraded to a 3-manual specification with 42 speaking stops. There is a ring of six bells which were cast in 1733 by Abraham Rudhall II.

== External features ==
In the churchyard is a former medieval buff sandstone font with an octagonal head, and a sundial dating from the late 17th century. The lych gate is dated 1904. It consists of open timber framing on an ashlar plinth with a Kerridge stone-slate roof. There are stone seats down each side. All these structures are listed at Grade II. In the churchyard is one of the oldest gravestones in Cheshire, dated 1596. The churchyard also contains the war graves of eight soldiers and a Royal Navy sailor of World War I.

== See also ==
- Grade I listed buildings in Cheshire East
- Grade I listed churches in Cheshire
- Listed buildings in Wilmslow
- List of works by J. S. Crowther
