= Listed buildings in Holmes Chapel =

Holmes Chapel is a civil parish in Cheshire East, England. It contains eleven buildings that are recorded in the National Heritage List for England as designated listed buildings. Of these, one is listed at Grade I, the highest grade, two are listed at Grade II*, the middle grade, and the others are at Grade II. The parish is occupied by the large village of Holmes Chapel and the surrounding countryside. What is now the Crewe–Manchester railway line passes through the parish, and there are two listed structures associated with this, the Twemlow Viaduct and a nearby boundary post. Also running through the parish is the River Dane, and a bridge crossing it is listed. The other listed buildings are houses, cottages and farmhouses, together with a church and a public house.

== Key ==
Grade	Criteria
I	Buildings of exceptional interest, sometimes considered to be internationally important
II*	Particularly important buildings of more than special interest
II	Buildings of national importance and special interest

== Buildings ==
Name and location	Photograph	Date	Notes	Grade
St Luke's Church; 53.20200°N 2.35750°W		c. 1430	The church has a Perpendicular sandstone tower. The body of the church was originally timber-framed, and was encased in brick in the early 18th century. It has a Welsh slate roof. The church consists of a nave with aisles, a chancel, a north vestry, and a west tower with a porch. Along the sides of the church are two tiers of round-headed windows.	I
Cotton Hall; 53.20315°N 2.37845°W	—	Late 15th century	A farmhouse that has been altered and extended, it is partly timber-framed with plastered infill and partly in brick. It has a tiled roof, is in two storeys with an attic, and has a five-bay gabled front. The east gable is jettied at first floor and gable levels, with a carved bressumer including female heads with ruffs. The windows are casements. Inside is an inglenook, and a mullioned window that was originally in an outside wall.	II*
72 Macclesfield Road; 53.20256°N 2.35125°W		Late 17th century	A cottage that was reconstructed in 1764. It is timber-framed with brick nogging on a brick plinth, and has a slate roof. The cottage is a single storey with an attic, and has a front with two bays. The windows are casements, those in the upper floor being in the gables, the latter of which have bargeboards and finials.	II
Marsh Hall; 53.19730°N 2.34598°W	—	Late 17th century	A farmhouse that was reconstructed in the 20th century. It is timber-framed with plastered panels and a thatched roof. The house is in a single storey with an attic, and there are three windows across the front. The windows are mullioned, those in the upper floor being in gables. The ground floor windows have lattice glazing.	II
The Old Red Lion; 53.20176°N 2.35741°W		Late 17th century	A pebbledashed brick public house with a slate roof. It has an F-shaped plan, is in two storeys with an attic, and has a four-bay front. The third bay projects forward and is gabled. In the second bay is a large canted bay window. The windows are sashes.	II*
3 and 5 Church View; 53.20215°N 2.35707°W		Early 18th century	A pair of brick houses, one with a slate roof, the other roofed with concrete tiles. They are in two storeys with attics, and each house has a three-bay front. The windows in the lower floors are sashes, and those in the attics are casements in gabled dormers with bargeboards. The doorways have architraves and fanlights.	II
Bridge Farmhouse; 53.20362°N 2.34729°W		1768	The farmhouse is in brick with a roof of slates and tiles. It is in two storeys and has a four-bay front. The windows are mainly casements, those in the upper floor being in gabled dormers. The gables have bargeboards and finials.	II
Hermitage Bridge; 53.20713°N 2.35202°W		1772	A bridge carrying Hermitage Drive over the River Dane. It is constructed in red sandstone, and consists of a single segmental arch. The carriageway is humped and is paved with stone setts. It has parapets without terminal piers.	II
7, 9 and 11 Church View; 53.20200°N 2.35711°W		Early 19th century	A row of three cottages, built in brick with slate roofs. They are in two storeys, and have a total front of four bays. The windows are casements.	II
Twemlow Viaduct; 53.20670°N 2.34325°W		1841	The viaduct was designed for the Manchester and Birmingham Railway Company by George W. Buck. It carries the railway over the River Dane, and is constructed in brick and sandstone. The viaduct consists of 23 semicircular arches, each with a span of 18 metres (59 ft), and it has a plain stone parapet.	II
Railway boundary post 53.20610°N 2.34367°W	—	Mid-19th century	The post is in cast iron and has a T-shaped cross-section with rounded top edges. It is inscribed "L & N W Ry Co" (London and North Western Railway Company).	II

== See also ==
- Listed buildings in Brereton
- Listed buildings in Cranage
- Listed buildings in Sproston
- Listed buildings in Twemlow
