= Brook Street Chapel, Knutsford =

Coordinates: 53.3017°N 2.3701°W

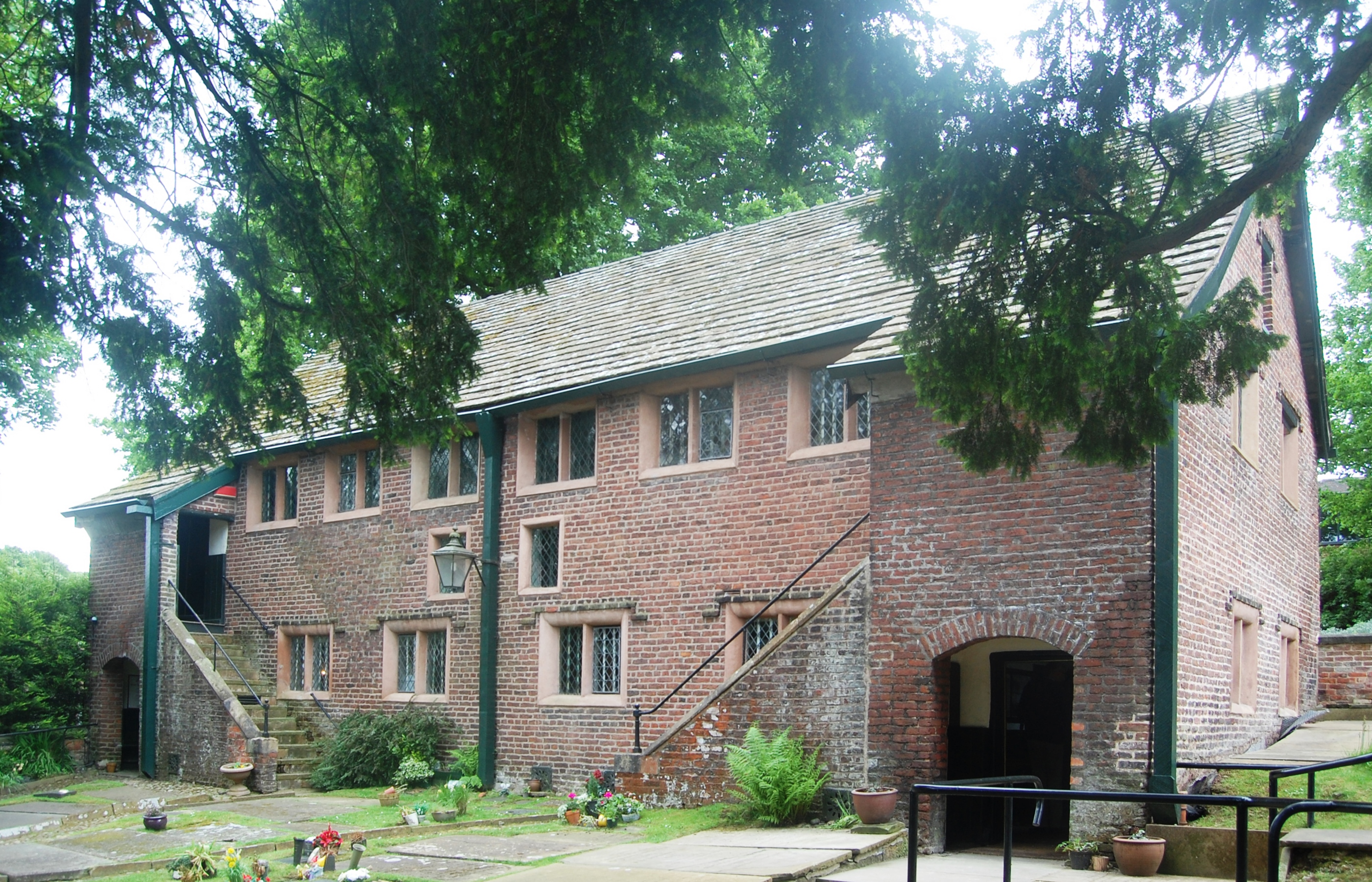
- Brook Street Chapel, Knutsford

- Location in Cheshire
- OS grid reference: SJ 754 783
- Location: Knutsford, Cheshire
- Country: England
- Denomination: Unitarian
- Website: Brook Street Chapel

Architecture
- Functional status: Active
- Heritage designation: Grade I
- Designated: 18 January 1949
- Architectural type: Chapel

Specifications
- Materials: Red brick, stone-flagged roof

Brook Street Chapel, is in the town of Knutsford, Cheshire, England. It is recorded in the National Heritage List for England as a designated Grade I listed building. The chapel was built in soon after the passing of the Toleration Act 1688. It is built in red brick with a stone-flagged roof in two storeys with two external staircases. Inside is a gallery on three sides and a pulpit on a long wall. The pulpit dates from the late 17th or early 18th century and the pews from 1859.

It is the burial place of the novelist Mrs Gaskell who died in 1865, her husband William Gaskell who died in 1884, and their two unmarried daughters who died in 1908 and 1913.

It is still in use as a Unitarian chapel.

== See also ==
- Grade I listed churches in Cheshire
- Grade I listed buildings in Cheshire East
- Listed buildings in Knutsford
