= Listed buildings in Baddiley =

Baddiley is a civil parish in Cheshire East, England. It contains nine buildings that are recorded in the National Heritage List for England as designated listed buildings. Of these, one is listed at Grade I, the highest grade, and the others are at Grade II. Apart from the village of Baddily, the parish is entirely rural. The listed buildings consist of the village church, houses and farm buildings. The Llangollen Canal runs through the parish, and the three locks on the canal in the parish are also listed.

== Key ==
Grade	Criteria
I	Buildings of exceptional interest, sometimes considered to be internationally important
II*	Particularly important buildings of more than special interest
II	Buildings of national importance and special interest

== Buildings ==
Name and location	Photograph	Date	Notes	Grade
St Michael's Church; 53.0489°N 2.5905°W		1308	The church is basically timber-framed, the oldest part being the chancel with its brick nogging. The taller and larger nave dates from the 15th or 16th century, and was encased in brick in 1811. The windows in the sides of the chancel are mullioned and have three lights; those long the nave are Gothic, also with three lights. On the west gable is a louvred bell-turret. The internal furnishings are well preserved.	I
Springe Lane Hall; 53.06678°N 2.58105°W		Early 17th century	The farmhouse is partly in brick and partly timber-framed with a tiled roof. It is in two storeys with an attic. The east and north fronts are in three bays, and the west front has a single bay. The north and south gables are jettied and plastered, all the gables have bargeboards, and the windows are casements. Inside the farmhouse is an inglenook.	II
Baddiley Hall; 53.04890°N 2.58958°W		Late 17th century (or earlier)	A Georgian brick house with stone dressings on a sandstone plinth with a tiled roof. With a northwest wing it has an L-shaped plan. The house is in three storeys with an attic, and has a three-bay front. The centre bay protrudes slightly forwards, and has a gable with a pediment. The doorway has a rusticated surround, with a triple keystone, and is approached up four steps. The windows on the front are sashes, and elsewhere there are casement windows.	II
Baddiley Lock Number 1; 53.03898°N 2.58669°W		1805	The engineer for the lock on the Llangollen Canal was J. Fletcher, the consultant being Thomas Telford. It is constructed in brick with stone dressings. The single south gate is metal, and at the north end is a pair of wooden gates.	II
Baddiley Lock Number 2; 53.04256°N 2.58584°W		1805	The engineer for the lock on the Llangollen Canal was J. Fletcher, the consultant being Thomas Telford. It is constructed in brick with stone dressings. The single south gate is metal, and at the north end is a pair of wooden gates.	II
Baddiley Lock Number 3; 53.04574°N 2.58448°W		1805	The engineer for the lock on the Llangollen Canal was J. Fletcher, the consultant being Thomas Telford. It is constructed in brick with stone dressings. The single south gate and the pair of gates at the north end are metal.	II
Crabmill Farmhouse; 53.04949°N 2.57339°W		Early 19th century	A farmhouse in red brick on a blue brick plinth with stone dressings and a tiled roof. With a rear wing, it has a T-shaped plan. The farmhouse is two storeys and an attic, and has a three-bay front. Between the bays and at the corners are half-brick pilasters. In the centre is a projecting timber porch with bargeboards and a finial. The windows in the main wing are sashes, and in the rear wing they are casements.	II
Baddiley Farmhouse; 53.05950°N 2.57073°W	—	c. 1870	The farmhouse is built in brick with a tiled roof. With its two wings, it has a U-shaped plan. The house is in two storeys and an attic, and has an entrance front of three bays, the right bay projecting forward under a gable. The side wings are both in five bays; in the south wing are two gabled dormers with bargeboards. The windows are casements with lozenge glazing, and on the gables are finials.	II
Farm buildings, Baddiley Farm; 53.05917°N 2.57084°W	—	c. 1870	A brick shippon with a tiled roof, it is in two storeys. The building has an L-shaped plan, with one wing in five bays, and the other in four bays. It contains doorways, casement windows, and circular pitch holes.	II
