= Holmes Chapel Comprehensive School =

Holmes Chapel Comprehensive School (HCCS)

Location
- Selkirk Drive; Holmes Chapel, Cheshire, CW4 7DX; England; 53.197189°N 2.368717°W

Information
- Type: Academy
- Motto: Preparing learners for a changing world
- Established: 1978
- Local authority: Cheshire East
- Department for Education URN: 137449 Tables
- Ofsted: Reports
- Chair of Governors: Christina Burgess
- Executive Headteacher: Nigel Bielby
- Staff: c. 87 teaching
- Gender: Co-educational
- Age: 11 to 18
- Enrolment: c. 1,225 pupils
- Houses: Arley, Capesthorne, Moreton and Tatton
- Colours: Black and yellow
- Notable Awards: Sportsmark Gold; Artsmark Silver

Holmes Chapel Comprehensive School is a co-educational secondary school and sixth form centre located in Holmes Chapel, Cheshire, England. It was founded in 1978 as a purpose-built 11–18 comprehensive and sixth form. It was opened in September 1978.

The school is a designated academy and Training School which has also been accredited with both Sportsmark and Artsmark awards.

== OFSTED ==
The most recent Office for Standards in Education, Children's Services and Skills (OFSTED) report concluded as follows:

"This very effective school provides excellent value for money. Its success is based on exceptionally strong leadership, much very good teaching and the very good attitudes of the overwhelming majority of the pupils. The achievement of all groups of pupils is very good. Pupils make very good progress in most subjects and overall results in National Curriculum tests and GCSE and A-level examinations are well above average."

== Expansion and development ==
Since it first opened over 40 years ago, HCCS's pupil population has grown, leading to expansion of the school buildings. In the last five years, a new Arts building was opened, as was an extension to the science department, and a complete refurbishment of all the science rooms was completed during the summer of 2007. Partially funded by donations and sponsorship from parents and local businesses, the Arts building is home to the art and music faculties, along with a number of rooms dedicated to Sixth Form use on the first floor including a common room, and other 'A level only' courses such as sociology and photography.

In September 2006 a new dining hall facility was completed. This building helped to resolve the problem of over-crowding at lunchtime, allowing lunch to be served in two sittings, rather than four. It also houses a dedicated 'bistro' for the use of Sixth Form pupils, which currently provides food in the mornings, which ends after lunch.

In 2013, the sixth form/arts block was redeveloped, also expanding the sixth form building. Temporary buildings were installed on the site for use as teaching facilities for the 6th form during the building period due to the structural defects discovered in the original facility.

In 2016, the Arts building was demolished and has been replaced with a building which has its own theatre. The sixth form is also in this building, with teaching rooms, a common room and a quiet study area. It also has its own cafe which is only for students in year 12 and 13, as well as teachers.

== Notable alumni ==
- Harry Styles – Singer, songwriter (born 1994)
- Dean Ashton – Crewe Alexandra, West Ham United and England footballer (born 1983)
- Seth Johnson – Ex Crewe Alexandra, Derby County, Leeds United and England footballer (born 1979)
- Andy Porter – Ex Port Vale player and assistant coach, and York City assistant coach (born 1968)
