= Highfields, Buerton =

Highfields
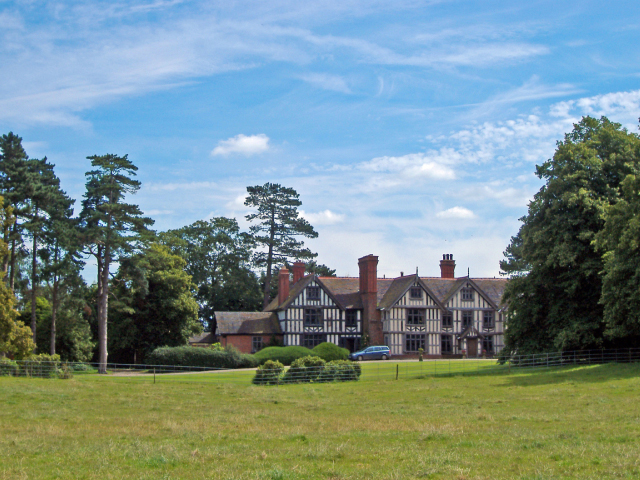
- Highfields

- Location in Cheshire
- 52.9654°N 2.4855°W
- Location: Buerton, Cheshire, England
- OS grid reference: SJ 674 409

History
- Built: 1615
- Built for: Dodds family

Listed Building – Grade I

Highfields is a small country house in the civil parish of Buerton, Cheshire, England. It is recorded in the National Heritage List for England as a designated Grade I listed building.

The house is dated 1615. It was built for the Dod family and additions were made in 1750 by William Baker, and again in 1897. It is timber-framed on an ashlar plinth with rendered infill and a plain tiled roof. The house consists of two storeys with an attic. The front elevation has five bays which are symmetrically disposed with projecting gabled wings on both sides. Both floors have close-studded walling with a middle rail. The first floor is jettied, as are the gables of the two lateral wings.

== See also ==
- Grade I listed buildings in Cheshire East
- Listed buildings in Buerton, Cheshire East
