= Baddiley Hall =

Country house in Cheshire, England

Coordinates: 53.04890°N 2.58958°W

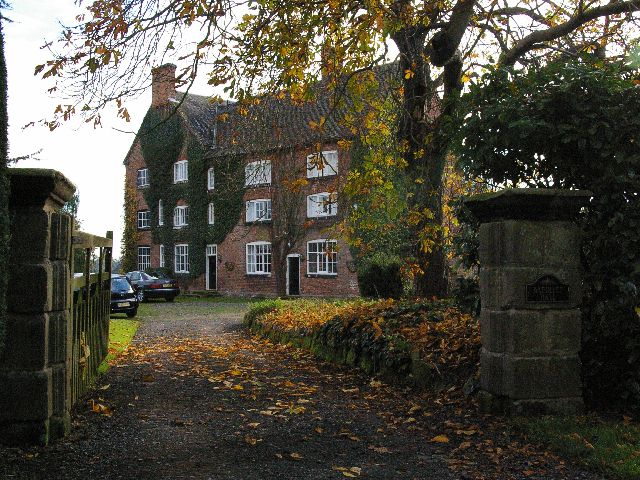
Baddiley Hall

Baddiley Hall is a country house in the settlement of Baddiley in Cheshire, England. Previously there was a half-timbered house on the site, but this had been replaced by the current house before the death of its owner, Sir Henry Mainwaring, in 1797. It is constructed in brown brick with a tiled roof, and has an L-shaped plan. Its architectural style is Georgian. The house is recorded in the National Heritage List for England as a designated Grade II listed building. Figueirdo and Treuherz comment that it is "a modest Georgian brick manor house, hardly more than a farmhouse".

== See also ==
- Listed buildings in Baddiley
