= Old Hall Hotel, Sandbach =

Grade I listed pub in Cheshire, England

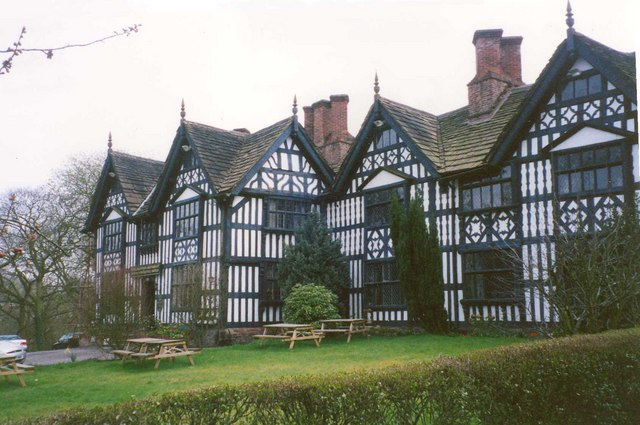
- Old Hall Hotel, Sandbach

- Location in Cheshire
- 53.1426°N 2.3607°W
- Location: High Street, Sandbach. Cheshire, England
- OS grid reference: SJ 760 607

History
- Built: 1656
- Built for: Sir John Radclyffe

Site notes
- Governing body: Brunning and Price

Listed Building – Grade I
- Official name: Old Hall Hotel
- Designated: 11 August 1950
- Reference no.: 1310849

Listed Building – Grade II
- Official name: Outbuildings of Old Hall Hotel
- Designated: 27 April 1978
- Reference no.: 1130357

The Old Hall Hotel is a public house and restaurant in High Street, Sandbach, Cheshire, England. It was built in 1656 on the site of a previous manor house, and since been extended. In the 18th century it was used as a coaching inn and hotel. It closed as a hotel in 2005; it was unused for four years, and its fabric suffered serious deterioration. In 2010 the building was bought by Brunning and Price, a subsidiary of the Restaurant Group, who repaired and restored it. It was reopened as a public house and restaurant in 2011. The building is timber-framed, and is recorded in the National Heritage List for England as a designated Grade I listed building.

== History ==
The construction of the present building dates from 1656. It was built on the site of the previous manor house of the Sondbache family that had been built in the 13th century, but had been destroyed by fire. There is evidence of an even older building on the site dating from the 12th century. This had been a rectangular wattle and daub structure with a turf roof serving as a seminary for the priests serving the nearby church. The present building was built by John Radclyffe, the son of Sir John Radclyffe, the lord of the manor of Sandbach. The first phase of the building was rectangular, and was constructed in oak timber framing with wattle and daub infill. Later an extension was built to the left; this was also timber-framed, but some brick was used at the rear. The building was further extended in the 18th century and the stables at the rear were enlarged. It then functioned as a coaching inn, and the Liverpool to Lichfield coach stopped to change horses. Passengers were encouraged to stay, and the inn was reclassified as a hotel. In the 19th century the hotel was part of the Crewe estate, and it was extended again, this time adding a carriage arch to the right wing. The building was restored in 1887 by John Stringer for the Crewe estate. During the Second World War the hotel was used to house American officers, who were visited here by General Patton. The hotel closed in 2005, and remained empty, its structure deteriorating. It was placed on the at Risk Register of English Heritage at priority A, the highest grading. A pressure group was established, the Save the Old Hall Action Group, to campaign for is repair and restoration. In 2004 it featured in Series 5 of the television programme Most Haunted. In 2010 the building was purchased by the Brunning and Price group of public houses, who rebuilt and restored it. (Note: Brunning and Price is a member of the Restaurant Group.) It opened as a public house and restaurant in June 2011.

== Architecture ==
=== Exterior ===
The building is timber-framed, with stone flagged roofs and brick chimney stacks. It stands on a plinth of brick and stone, it is in three storeys, and has four gables on the front. Both the original part to the right, and the later addition to the left, which protrudes and is in a similar style, have two gables and are symmetrical. The building has a double pile plan. The gables contain restored bargeboards and finials. The windows have moulded wooden mullions and transoms, and contain casements, and the windows in the middle storey have pediments. (Note: Hartwell et al comment that the pediments, if they are original, are an unusual use of Classical motifs in timber framing.) The decoration of the timber framing includes lozenges and wavy motifs.

=== Interior ===
The left wing has a central entrance that leads to a corridor to an original oak baluster staircase at the rear, with two rooms on each side. In these rooms are three Jacobean fireplaces, 17th-century oak panelling, a left-handed spiral staircase, and a priest's hole.

=== Appraisal ===
The hotel is designated as a Grade I listed building. Grade I is the highest of the three grades of listing and is given to "buildings of exceptional interest, sometimes considered to be internationally important".

== Associated structures ==
There is a separate outbuilding to the rear of the hotel. This is timber-framed with brick nogging, and is in two storeys, with various openings for doors and windows. It is designated as a Grade II listed building. Grade II list the lowest of the three gradings, and is applied to "buildings of national importance and special interest". The building, previously used as stables, has been converted into private housing.

== See also ==
- Grade I listed buildings in Cheshire East
- Listed buildings in Sandbach

== Notes and references ==
Notes

Citations
