= Listed buildings in Buerton, Cheshire East =

Buerton is a civil parish in Cheshire East, England. It contains twelve buildings that are recorded in the National Heritage List for England as designated listed buildings. Of these, one is listed at Grade I, the highest grade, one is listed at Grade II*, the middle grade, and the others are at Grade II. Apart from the village of Buerton, the parish is rural. The listed buildings consist of houses and associated structures, farmhouses and farm buildings, and a former windmill.

== Key ==
Grade	Criteria
I	Buildings of exceptional interest, sometimes considered to be internationally important
II*	Particularly important buildings of more than special interest
II	Buildings of national importance and special interest

== Buildings ==
Name and location	Photograph	Date	Notes	Grade
Barn, Woodhouse Farm; 52.97081°N 2.48285°W		16th or 17th century	The barn is built in timber-framing with brick infill, and in brick. It has a tiled roof, and is in two storeys. The features include cart doorways, ventilation slits, and 20th-century inserted windows.	II
Highfields; 52.96534°N 2.48554°W		1615	A country house that was extended in 1750, and again in 1897. It is timber-framed with rendered infill on a stone plinth, and has a tiled roof. The house is in two storeys with an attic, and has a symmetrical five-bay front. The end bays project forward and are gabled, and the upper floor is jettied.	I
Dairy House; 52.98677°N 2.47073°W	—	17th century	A farmhouse that is basically timber-framed. This is partly exposed, partly rendered, and partly encased in brick. The farmhouse has a tiled roof, and is in two storeys. In the centre of the entrance front is section with a doorway over which is a gabled dormer. This section is flanked on both sides by protruding gabled sections, and on the right side is another protruding gabled section. The windows are casements.	II
Barn, Dairy House; 52.98696°N 2.47113°W	—	17th century	The barn is timber-framed with brick infill, and has a tiled roof. The timber framing has been partly replaced in brick. The barn is in two storeys, and has a curved plan.	II
Smithy House Farmhouse; 52.98494°N 2.47915°W	—	17th century	The farmhouse is partly timber-framed with brick infill and partly in brick. It has a tiled roof. Originally in a single storey with an attic, it has been raised to two storeys. On the right is a 19th-century brick gabled wing. The windows are casements.	II
Yew Tree Farmhouse; 52.96694°N 2.46863°W	—	Mid 17th century (probable)	The farmhouse is timber-framed with brick infill and later extensions in brick. It has a tiled roof, and is in 1 1/2 storeys. The upper windows are in dormers. Inside the farmhouse is an inglenook.	II
Woodhouse Farmhouse; 52.97083°N 2.48234°W	—	Late 17th or early 18th century	The farmhouse is built in brick with a tiled roof. The entrance front is symmetrical, and is in five bays. It has a central doorway with a 19th-century gabled porch. The windows are casements.	II*
Wall and gate piers, Woodhouse Farmhouse; 52.97067°N 2.48255°W	—	18th century	The garden wall and the gate piers are in brick with stone dressings. The gate piers are square and have caps with ball finials. The walls are about 3 feet (0.9 m) high, and have ashlar coping.	II
Buerton Old Windmill; 52.99227°N 2.46982°W	—	Late 18th to early 19th century.	The body of the former windmill remains. It is built in brick, has a circular plan, and is in four storeys. There are four windows to each storey, two doorways on the ground floor, and a loft door above the front doorway.	II
Farm building, Malt Kiln Farm; 52.98658°N 2.47200°W	—	Early 19th century	The farm building is in brick with stone dressings, and has a roof of tiles and metal sheeting. It is in two storeys with an entrance front of five bays. The building contains doorways, windows and pitch holes.	II
Kynsal Lodge; 52.97498°N 2.49055°W	—	c. 1850	A small country house, built in brick with stone dressings and a slate roof in Italianate style. In the entrance front is a stone porch with pilasters, and a bay with a pedimented gable. On the garden front is a central gabled bay. The windows are sashes.	II
Stable block, Kynsal Lodge; 52.97526°N 2.49023°W	—	c. 1850	The stable block is built in brick with a slate roof, and is in one and two storeys. It is in three ranges, forming an open courtyard. The main range has a slightly projecting central bay containing an arched entrance. Above this is a loft door, over which is a gable and a weathervane.	II
