= Moss Hall, Audlem =

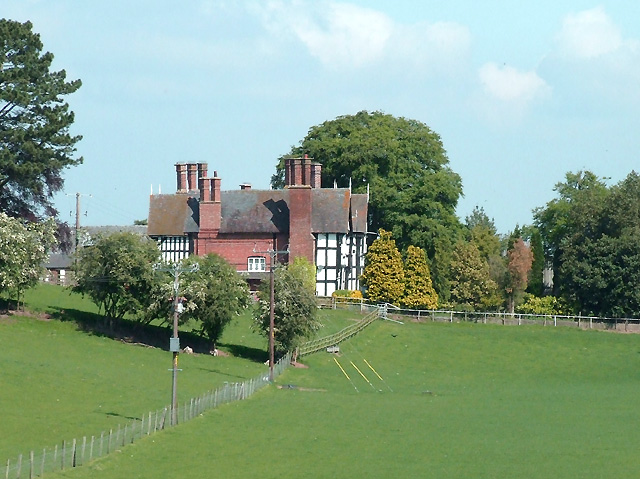
- Moss Hall from the south-east

- Location in Cheshire
- 52.9928°N 2.5147°W
- OS grid reference: SJ 655 440

History
- Built: 1616
- Built for: Hugh Massey

Listed Building – Grade I
- Official name: Moss Hall
- Designated: 10 June 1952
- Reference no.: 1138519

Moss Hall, Audlem, is a manor house 0.5 miles (1 km) north-west of Audlem, Cheshire, England. It is recorded in the National Heritage List for England as a designated Grade I-listed building. The Hall overlooks the Shropshire Union Canal.

Moss Hall was built in 1616 for Hugh Massey, then owned by Edward Legh of Baguley Hall. It is timber-framed with rendered infill, and close studded with a middle rail to both floors. It is in two storeys with attics, and has a plain tile roof. The entrance front has five bays with four gables. The house is nearly symmetrical, is E-shaped, and is set on an ashlar plinth. In its centre is a two-storey gabled porch wing, which is a later addition. The first floor is jettied and supported on carved brackets. It has been described as "a surprisingly complete example of a gentleman's house of the early 17th century".

== See also ==
- Grade I listed buildings in Cheshire East
- Listed buildings in Audlem
