= Peover Hall Stable Block =

- Location in Cheshire
- 53.2573°N 2.3418°W
- Location: Peover Hall, Cheshire, England
- OS grid reference: SJ 772 734

History
- Built: 1654
- Built for: Mrs Ellen Mainwaring

Listed Building – Grade I
- Designated: 5 September 1959
- Reference no.: 1335855

Peover Hall Stable Block is in the grounds of Peover Hall, Cheshire, England. It is recorded in the National Heritage List for England as a designated Grade I listed building.

== History ==
The stable block was built in 1654 as a gift from Mrs Ellen Mainwaring to her son Thomas. A first floor was added to it in the early or middle part of the 18th century. A coach house was added to the right of the block in 1764, and an extension was added to the rear later in the century. On its left is a 20th-century addition.

== Architecture ==
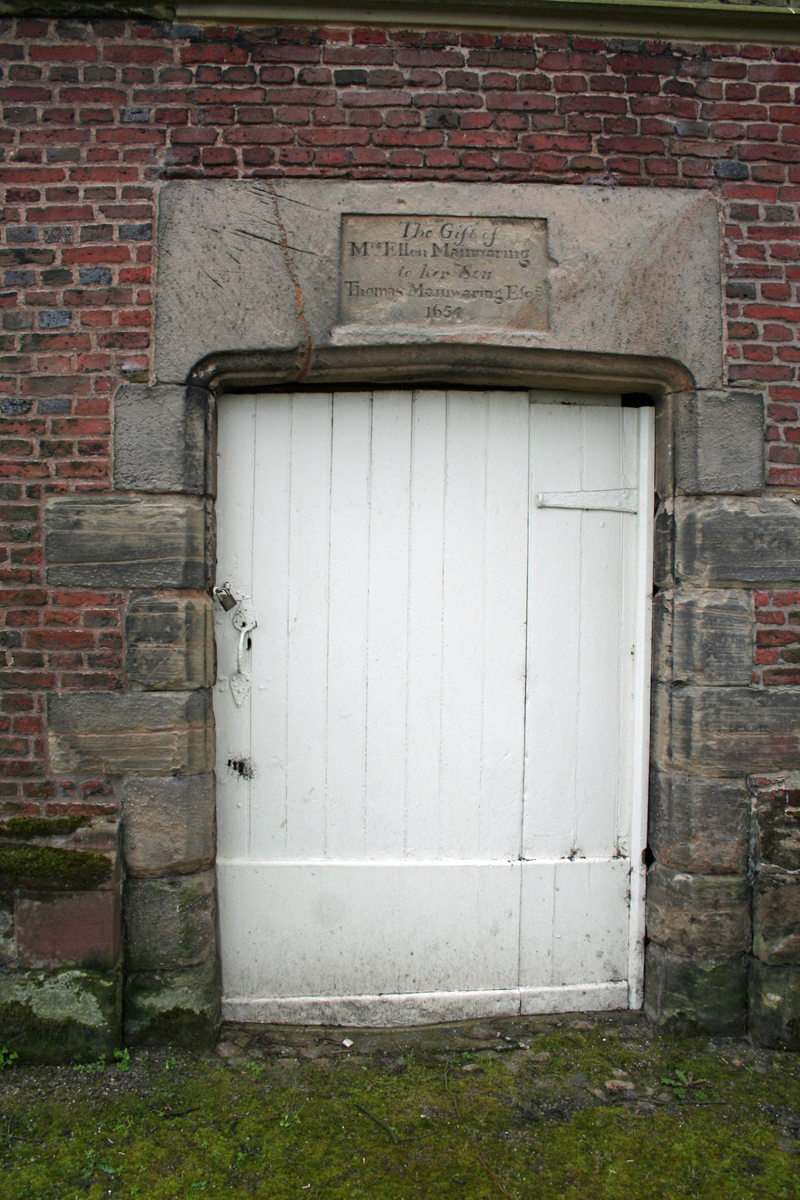
Doorway to the stable block with inscription

The block is in two storeys, and is built in red and plum-coloured brick with a slate roof and stone dressings. The brickwork is in English bond and the bricks in the upper storey are lighter in colour than those in the lower storey. The brickwork rests on a stone plinth, a string course runs between the storeys, and stone quoins are at the corners. The entrance door is in the centre and has a moulded stone surround. On the door lintel is an inscribed panel relating to the gift and its date. On each side of the door are three five-light windows with moulded stone surrounds and mullions. In the upper storey are three round pitch holes with plain stone surrounds. The rear extension consists of three gabled two-storey wings with single-storey loose boxes between them. The wings each have a circular hole in the first floor; in the middle wing this leads to a pigeon loft, while the others are pitch holes.

Internally are 13 stalls with wooden terminating posts in the form of carved Tuscan style columns standing on octagonal pedestals. The upper parts of the columns have semicircular arches leading to carved lintels, the whole structure forming an elaborate screen. At the rear of the stalls are square posts with arched braces. The ceiling is panelled and the panels contain floral patterns in relief. It is stated that "the application of these details to a stable makes this one of the most lavish buildings of this date in Cheshire". The authors of the Buildings of England series state that it is "an important survival of the type".

== See also ==
- Grade I listed buildings in Cheshire East
- Listed buildings in Peover Superior
