= Grade I listed churches in Cheshire =

Churches in Cheshire, England

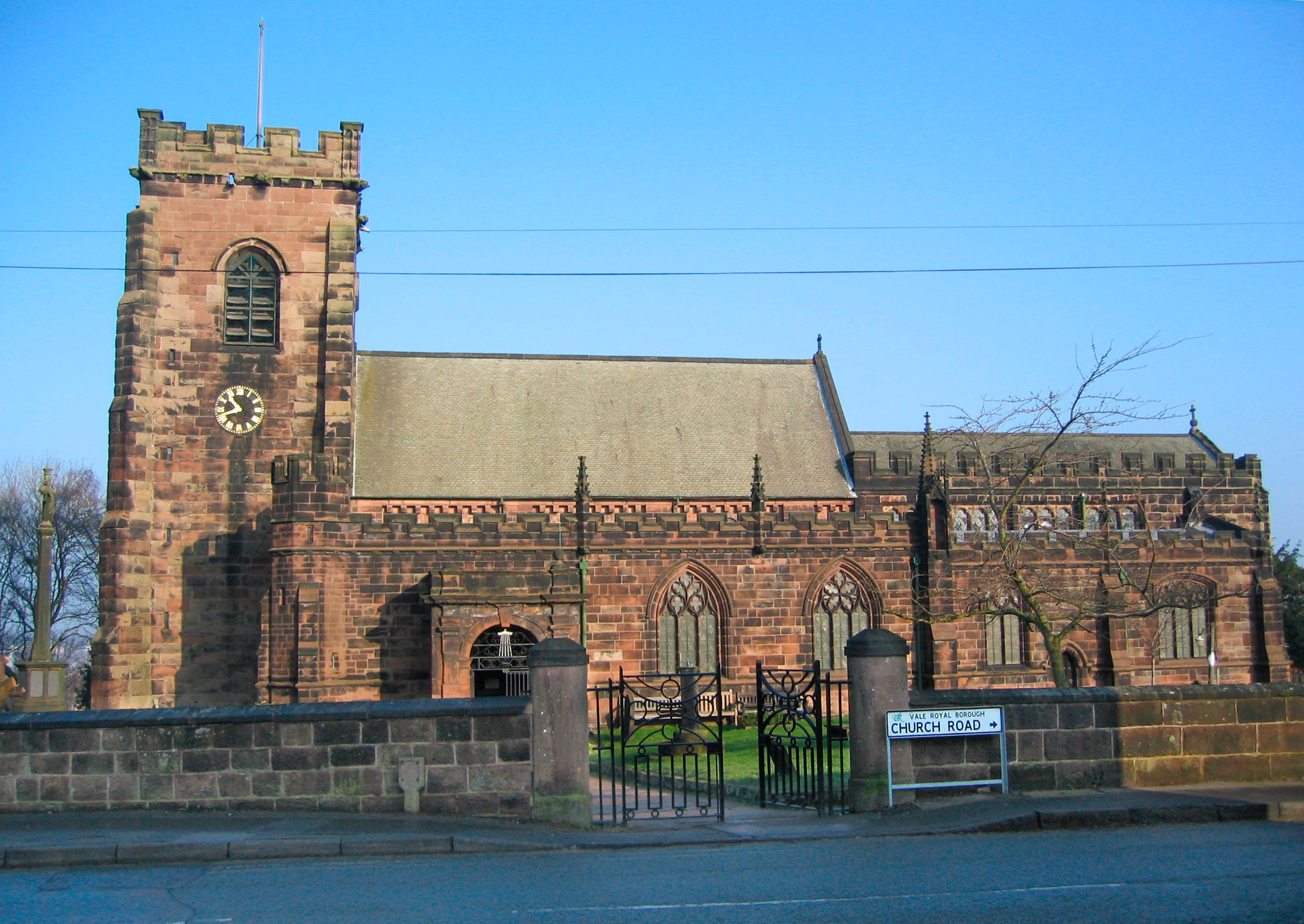
St Laurence's Church, Frodsham

Cheshire is a county in North West England. In 1974 parts of the historical county of Cheshire were transferred to Greater Manchester and to Merseyside, and parts of the historical county of Lancashire were incorporated into Cheshire, including the towns of Widnes and Warrington. The unitary authorities of Halton and Warrington were created in 1998, and in 2009 the rest of the county was divided into two further unitary authorities: Cheshire East, and Cheshire West and Chester. The ceremonial county of Cheshire consists of those four unitary authorities.

In England, buildings are given listed building status by the Secretary of State for Culture, Media and Sport, acting on the recommendation of Historic England. This gives the structure national recognition and protection against alteration or demolition without authorisation. Grade I listed buildings are defined as being of "exceptional interest, sometimes considered to be internationally important"; only 2.5 per cent of listed buildings are included in this grade. This is a complete list of Grade I listed churches and chapels in Cheshire as recorded in the National Heritage List for England.

Christian churches have existed in Cheshire since the Anglo-Saxon era, but no significant Saxon features remain in its listed churches. Surviving Norman architecture is found, notably in Chester Cathedral and St John the Baptist, Chester. Most of the remaining churches in this list are in the Gothic style, dating between the 13th and the 17th centuries, predominantly in the Perpendicular style. There are some examples of Neoclassical architecture, including St Peter, Aston-by-Sutton, and St Peter, Congleton. The only buildings in the list dating from a later period, both from the 19th century, are Waterhouse's Eaton Chapel in French Rayonnant style, and Bodley's Church of St Mary at Eccleston, in Gothic Revival style. Churches with a significant amount of timber-framing, which has in some cases been encased in brick, include St Michael, Baddiley, St Luke, Holmes Chapel, St Oswald, Lower Peover, and St James and St Paul, Marton.

The county town of Chester has an important Roman history, but as a result of the 1974 reorganisation the largest settlement is Warrington. The local economy is mixed, with a mainly agricultural heartland and industrial towns in the north involved in heavy engineering, chemicals, and textiles. Most of the county's bedrock is sandstone, with limestone deposits in the northeast, both of which provide the major building materials for the churches. There are also a significant number of surviving timber-framed buildings in the county, some of them churches.

== Churches ==
Name	Location	Photograph	Notes
St Mary	Acton; 53.0737°N 2.5512°W	A Gothic stone church with a tower on the left	The base of the tower dates from the 13th century, but the remainder of the church is from the 14th and 15th centuries. The top of the tower fell in 1757 and was rebuilt by William Baker. Restorations in the 17th and 18th centuries were followed by another in 1897–98 by Austin and Paley, who rebuilt the north wall of the north aisle. The church contains fragments of 11th-century carvings, the font is from the 12th century, and the altar rail is dated 1685.
St Mary	Astbury; 53.1507°N 2.2314°W	A Gothic stone church with a tall steeple on the left linked to the battlemented body of the church on the right	The church dates from the 12th century, with alterations and additions during the following three centuries. During the 19th century it was restored by Anthony Salvin, and later by George Gilbert Scott. The body of the church is constructed in sandstone ashlar, and the tower in millstone grit. The tower stands separately from the church, joined to it by a passage with a porch. The body of the church has a trapezoidal shape, and is mainly Perpendicular in style, but also includes Norman, Early English and Decorated features. There are many medieval fittings and furnishings inside the church.
St Peter	Aston-by-Sutton; 53.3012°N 2.6679°W	A Neoclassical stone church with a small bell tower and cupola	St Peter's dates from the 17th century. Designed by Thomas Webb for Sir Willoughby Aston of Aston Hall, its chancel was built in 1697. The nave was completed in about 1736, and the whole church was refurbished in 1857. It was damaged by a land mine in 1940, and subsequently repaired. The church is constructed in sandstone ashlar with slate roofs, in the Neoclassical style. At the west end of the church is a cupola, and inside are monuments to the Aston family.
St James	Audlem; 52.9891°N 2.5079°W	A stone Gothic church with a battlemented tower and body	The church is mainly Perpendicular in style, dating from the 15th century, although some Decorated features from the late 13th and the 14th centuries are present. Alterations were carried out in 1885–86 by Lynam and Rickman, which included lengthening the chancel. The church is constructed in sandstone ashlar, with lead roofs and crenellated parapets.
St Michael	Baddiley; 53.0489°N 2.5905°W	A church with a brick nave on the left, and a smaller timber-framed chancel on the right	St Michael's is a timber-framed church dating from the 14th century with a tiled roof. The nave was encased in brick in 1811, and the timber-framing of the chancel is infilled with brick. At the west end is a porch and a louvred bell turret. Inside the church is a 15th-century screen between the nave and the chancel. Above this is a plastered wattle and daub tympanum divided into five panels, the central panel of which contains two coats of arms and the date 1663.
St Bertoline	Barthomley; 53.0682°N 2.3483°W	A stone Gothic tower with a clock face	The major part of the church dates from the 15th century, and is Perpendicular in style. The Crewe chapel was added in about 1528. The chancel was rebuilt in 1925–26 by Austin and Paley. A Norman doorway re-set in the north wall of the chancel dates from about 1130–40. Monuments inside the church include one by W E. Nesfield, and another by J. E. Boehm.
St Boniface	Bunbury; 53.1182°N 2.6453°W	A Gothic stone church with a tower on the right	The present church dates from the 14th century except for the top of its tower, which was added or rebuilt in the following century, and the Ridley Chapel, added in 1527. In 1863–66 the timber clerestory was replaced in stone by Pennington and Bridgen. The church was damaged by a land mine in 1940, and repaired during the 1950s by Marshall Sisson. The architectural style is mainly Perpendicular. In the centre of the chancel is the tomb with the painted effigy of Sir Hugh Calverley, who died in 1394. A painted medieval screen dating from about 1450 is said to be the only substantial one of its type in the county.
Chester Cathedral	Chester; 53.1919°N 2.8905°W	The south transept and tower of a Gothic stone cathedral	Formerly the abbey church of a Benedictine monastery, the cathedral has a complex architecture and history. It contains the shrine of Saint Werburgh and became a cathedral following the dissolution of the monasteries. Among its notable features are the carved canopies above the choir stalls dating from about 1380. The former monastic buildings are to the north of the cathedral, and are also listed as Grade I.
St John the Baptist	Chester; 53.1890°N 2.8856°W	A long stone Gothic church with no tower or steeple	Originating in the 11th century as a collegiate church, for a few years St John's had the status of a cathedral. Its subsequent history has been complicated, with a series of tower collapses, and the abandonment of the east end, which is now in ruins. In 1859–66 the church was restored by R. C. Hussey. The final collapse of the tower in 1881 damaged the north porch, which was repaired by John Douglas; he also added a modest northeast bell tower in 1886–87. Much Norman architecture has survived in the interior.
St Mary	Chester; 53.1863°N 2.8911°W	The pinnacled tower and part of the body of a stone Gothic church	St Mary's dates from the 14th century, with later additions and alterations. It was damaged during the Civil War, and subsequently repaired. Restorations and further repairs were carried out by James Harrison in 1861–62, and by J. P. Seddon with T. M. Lockwood in 1890–91. The church contains Decorated and Perpendicular features. It was declared redundant in 1972, and has since been used as an educational centre. The furnishings have been removed, but it still contains 72 memorials and cenotaphs.
St Peter	Chester; 53.1904°N 2.8918°W	A stone Gothic church with a tower surmounted by a pyramidal roof see at the end of a street	A church existed on the site before the Norman conquest. The present structure dates from the 14th century, with additions and alterations in each of the following six centuries. The church was repaired by James Harrison in 1849–50, and restored in 1886 by Douglas & Fordham, who added the pyramidal spire. It has since been modified to act as an ecumenical centre as well as a church.
St Nicholas	Cholmondeley Castle; 53.0573°N 2.6932°W	A small Neoclassical brick chapel with a slate roof	This private chapel to Cholmondeley Castle probably dates from the 15th century. It was repaired following damage during the Civil War, and in 1717 the chapel's timber framing was encased in brick in Neoclassical style; transepts were added in 1829. The interior contains an almost complete set of 17th-century furnishings, including a family pew at the west end, entered by an external staircase. Hatchments in the chapel date between 1815 and 1990.
St Peter	Congleton; 53.1618°N 2.2116°W	A brick Neoclassical body of a church with a stone Gothic tower on its left side	The church's Gothic-style tower dates from the 15th century, but was raised in height in 1786. The Neoclassical body of the church was rebuilt in brick with stone dressings in 1740–42, to a design by the architect William Baker. The west end of the nave was extended on each side of the tower in 1839–40 by Joshua Radford, and the porch with its Doric columns was added. The 18th-century interior has been well preserved, with box pews throughout, three galleries, a reredos dated 1743, and a chandelier dated 1748.
Eaton Chapel	Eaton Hall; 53.1409°N 2.8776°W	A Gothic Revival chapel with a tall Big Ben-like clock tower	Designed by Alfred Waterhouse for the 1st Duke of Westminster, this was built between 1873 and 1884 as the private chapel to Eaton Hall. It is in French Rayonnant style, with a tall clock tower to the south of the body of the chapel. Inside the chapel are furnishings designed by Waterhouse, mosaics and stained glass by Frederic Shields, and a monument to the 1st Duchess of Westminster with an effigy by Joseph Boehm.
St Mary	Eccleston; 53.1576°N 2.8794°W	A stone Gothic Revival church with a battlemented tower	Replacing an earlier church on the site, St Mary's was built in 1899. It was designed by G. F. Bodley, and paid for by the 1st Duke of Westminster, whose monument is in the church. The church is constructed in sandstone ashlar with lead roofs. The architectural style is Gothic Revival of the 14th century with Decorated tracery.
St Laurence	Frodsham; 53.2905°N 2.7196°W	A stone Gothic church with battlemented parapets and tower	The church dates from the late 12th century, with a 14th-century west tower. The porches date from 1715 and 1724. It was restored and partly rebuilt in 1880–83 by Bodley and Garner. The interior of the church has retained much of its original Norman architecture, but as a result of rebuilding work the exterior appears to be almost completely Decorated and Perpendicular. The piscina and sedilia both date from the 14th century.
Woodhey Chapel	Faddiley; 53.0706°N 2.6383°W	A small brick Neoclassical chapel with a slate roof, and part of a loggia behind	This was the private chapel to Woodhey Hall, now demolished. It was built in about 1700, and is attached to a 17th-century loggia. It is a plain brick structure with a slate roof, consisting of a three-bay nave. The interior contains a west gallery with family pew and fireplaces, box pews, Commandment boards, a free-standing pulpit, and a large chandelier.
St James	Gawsworth; 53.2241°N 2.1661°W	A Gothic stone church with a pinnacled tower	The nave was built in about 1430, followed by the chancel and tower between about 1497 and 1536. The church is constructed in sandstone. Its architectural style is Perpendicular throughout. It is a wide church without aisles, the nave divided from the chancel by a screen dating from 1894 by J. Oldrid Scott. In the chancel are four monuments with effigies of members of the Fitton family.
St Wilfrid	Grappenhall; 53.3723°N 2.5434°W	A stone Gothic church with a battlemented tower on the left	Although there is some Norman fabric in the south wall of the nave, and the south chapel was built as a chantry in about 1334, the tower and most of the rest of the church date from 1525 to 1539. The clerestory was added in 1833, and the north vestry in 1851. In 1873–74 Paley and Austin carried out a restoration, probably adding the north transept and the south porch. The font is Norman, and a window in the south aisle contains fragments of 14th-century stained glass.
St Mary and All Saints	Great Budworth; 53.2936°N 2.5043°W	A stone Gothic church with a battlemented tower and a lych gate to the left	The church was built in stages between the 14th and 16th centuries. The architectural style of the north transept is Decorated, in contrast to the Perpendicular style of the rest of the church. Influenced by Rowland Egerton Warburton of Arley Hall, the church contains furnishings by Anthony Salvin, William Butterfield and John Douglas.
St Luke	Holmes Chapel; 53.2020°N 2.3575°W	A church with a Neoclassical brick body and a stone Gothic tower	Originating as a timber-framed Perpendicular church in about 1430, the body was encased in brick in the early 18th century, providing two tiers of windows along the sides. The embattled tower is in sandstone. Inside the church is a screen with a frieze inscribed with the date 1623, south and west galleries dated 1705, and a chandelier dated 1798.
Brook Street Chapel	Knutsford; 53.3017°N 2.3701°W	A long brick chapel with rectangular windows and an external staircase at each end	This Unitarian chapel was built in 1689 in brick with a stone-slate roof; it has a pair of external staircases leading to a gallery that runs internally round three sides of the chapel. The exterior is expressed as two storeys, and all the windows have two lights with mullions. The chapel has associations with the novelist Mrs Gaskell, who is buried in the churchyard.
St Oswald	Lower Peover; 53.2639°N 2.3864°W	A church with a Gothic stone battlemented tower and a timber-framed body to the right	The body of the church is timber-framed, and dates from the 14th and 15th centuries. The sandstone tower was added in 1582, the south aisle was rebuilt in brick in 1610, and the north chapel in 1624. In 1852 Anthony Salvin altered and re-roofed the aisles. Inside the church many of the 17th-century furnishings have been retained.
St Oswald	Malpas; 53.0195°N 2.7670°W	A broad stone Gothic church with its tower just visible at the far end	St Oswald's dates from the late 14th century, but its upper parts were largely rebuilt in Perpendicular style in the late 15th century. A vestry was added in 1717 and the church was restored in about 1886 by John Douglas. Except for the vestry, which is in brick, it is constructed in sandstone with lead roofs. Inside are the Brereton and Cholmondeley Chapels, named after prominent local families, and each containing memorials to members of those families.
St James and St Paul	Marton; 53.2088°N 2.2257°W	A timber-framed church with a small tower and spirelet	Dating from the 14th century, the church is timber-framed on a stone plinth, with rendered brick infill and close studding. At the west end is a tower and broach spire, both of which are shingled, surrounded by an ambulatory. The church was restored in 1850 by J. M. Derick, and by William Butterfield in 1871. The interior contains traces of medieval wall paintings.
St Wilfrid	Mobberley; 53.3182°N 2.3161°W	A stone Gothic church with a tower	St Wilfrid's dates from the 14th and 15th centuries. The tower is dated 1533, built by master mason Richard Platt. In 1889 J. S. Crowther started a restoration that was completed after his death, possibly by W. D. Caroe. Inside the church are the remains of wall paintings, and a screen dated 1500, considered to be "the best in the county".
St Mary	Nantwich; 53.0671°N 2.5206°W	A stone Gothic church with an octagonal tower	St Mary's, a cruciform church with an octagonal tower above the crossing, dates from the 14th century. It is constructed in sandstone and displays elements of Decorated and Perpendicular styles. Notable internal features include the lierne vaulting of the chancel, the carving of the canopies of the choir stalls, and the misericords. The church was restored in 1854–61 by George Gilbert Scott.
St Mary	Nether Alderley; 53.2820°N 2.2389°W	A stone church with a battlemented Gothic tower	The nave dates from the 14th century, the tower was added in the following century, and there were further additions in the 17th century. The chancel was rebuilt in 1856, to a design by architects Cuffley and Starkey, and in 1860 a vestry was added. In 1877–78 Paley and Austin carried out a restoration. The architectural style is mainly Perpendicular. Features inside the church include the Jacobean Stanley pew, which is entered by an exterior staircase, and monuments to the Lords Stanley of Alderley.
St Helen	Northwich; 53.2602°N 2.5046°W	The apse of a stone Gothic church with the tower beyond	The church dates from the 14th century; it was enlarged at the end of the 15th or beginning of the 16th century. There were restorations in 1842, 1861, and in 1883–86, the last by Paley and Austin, who added a vestry, widened the north aisle, and made internal alterations. At the east end of the church is a canted apse containing a five-light window.
St Lawrence	Over Peover; 53.2582°N 2.3431°W	A church with a brick Neoclassical tower and body and a stone Gothic chapel protruding in the foreground	The oldest part of the church is the south chapel, which is Perpendicular in style and dates from about 1456; the next oldest is the Neoclassical north chapel, dating from about 1648. The tower was built in 1739, and probably designed by J. Garlive. The nave and chancel, designed by William Turner, date from 1881. The church was refurbished in 1895 by Austin and Paley. The chapels are constructed in ashlar stone with lead roofs, whereas the rest of the church is in brick with tiled roofs. The church contains monuments to the Mainwaring family.
St Peter	Plemstall; 53.2251°N 2.8147°W	A stone Gothic church with a pinnacled and battlemented tower	St Peter's is a Perpendicular church dating mainly from the 15th century, with alterations in the following century, and a tower added in 1826. It is constructed in sandstone with slate roofs. The plan of the church includes two parallel naves with hammerbeam roofs. Many of the internal furnishings were carved by Revd J. H. Toogood, the incumbent from 1907 to 1946.
St Christopher	Pott Shrigley; 53.3098°N 2.0847°W	A stone Gothic church with a pinnacled tower	The church was founded as a chantry in about 1492. It originated as a nave and chancel, followed by the tower and the north aisle, and finally by the south aisle. The body of the church is wider than it is long, and the tower is relatively large for the size of the rest of the church. Inside the church are box pews, an altar dated 1698, and a monument by John Bacon dating from the end of the 18th century.
St Peter	Prestbury; 53.2893°N 2.1503°W	A stone Gothic church with a pinnacled tower	The church dates from the 13th century except for its south aisle, which was added in the following century. The tower and porch were built in about 1480. The roof of the nave dates from 1675, and it is possible that the clerestory was added at the same time. The north aisle was widened in 1739–41. In 1879–85 the church was restored by George Gilbert Scott and his son J. Oldrid Scott. Inside the church are a pulpit of 1607, a ringers' gallery of 1637, and wall paintings executed in 1719.
St Mary	Rostherne; 53.3495°N 2.3880°W	A stone Gothic church with a tower and dormer windows in the nave roof	The earliest parts of the church date from the 14th century, with 16th-century additions. The tower, designed by John Rowson, was built in 1742–74. The chancel, vestry and southeast chapel were remodelled in 1888 by Arthur Blomfield. The bell openings are in the shape of Venetian windows, otherwise the church is Gothic in style, mainly Perpendicular. Inside the church are many monuments, including memorials by Richard Westmacott junior and John Bacon junior.
St Edith	Shocklach; 53.0459°N 2.8490°W	A small stone church with a Norman doorway and a double bellcote	The nave of this small and simple church is Norman, dating from the 12th century, with the chancel dating from the 14th century. During the 17th century the west end of the church was altered to provide a baptistry between buttresses. The pulpit is dated 1687, and the ceiling of 1813 is decorated with rosettes. The north vestry was rebuilt in 1926.
St Michael	Shotwick; 53.2388°N 2.9951°W	A church with a small body containing rectangular windows and a large Gothic tower	The body of the church dates from the 14th century, and incorporates an 11th-century Norman doorway. The tower was added in about 1500 and is in Perpendicular style. Inside the church is an 18th-century three-decker pulpit and a churchwarden's pew dated 1673. One of the windows contains stained glass from the 14th century depicting the Annunciation.
St Peter	Tabley; 53.2961°N 2.4142°W	A brick church with a tower on the right incorporating two stone balustrades	This is the chapel to Tabley House, which was constructed in 1761–67 to replace Tabley Old Hall. It was built in 1675–78 on a site adjacent to the Old Hall and a tower was added in 1724. In the early 20th century the chapel was affected by subsidence resulting from brine extraction, and it was moved to a site adjacent to the house in 1927–29. The seating inside is arranged as for a college chapel, and one of the windows contains stained glass designed by Edward Burne-Jones.
St Andrew	Tarvin; 53.1974°N 2.7620°W	A stone Gothic church with a battlemented tower	The nave and south aisle date from the latter part of the 14th century, the tower and the north aisle from the late 15th century, and the chancel from the mid-18th century. The church was restored in 1876 by Kelly and Edwards, and there was a further restoration in 1908 by F. P. Oakley. Constructed in sandstone with slate roofs, the church contains Decorated and Perpendicular features.
St Mary	Thornton-le-Moors; 53.2650°N 2.8386°W	A stone Gothic church with a battlemented tower	St Mary's dates from the 14th century, with additions and alterations from the following centuries. The south porch is dated 1685. In 1910 the tower was damaged by fire and had to be rebuilt. The church contains a series of painted armorial boards dating between 1634 and 1687, considered to be by members of the Randle Holme family of Chester. The church has been declared redundant, and is vested in the Churches Conservation Trust.
St Chad	Tushingham; 53.0117°N 2.7057°W	A small chapel with a tower surmounted by a pyramidal roof	St Chad's Chapel stands in an isolated position surrounded by fields. It is a simple brick building with a slate roof, constructed in 1689–91. There is a narrow west tower with a pyramidal roof, and an external staircase leading to the west gallery. Inside the church is a Jacobean font, a three-decker pulpit, and two family pews.
St Mary	Weaverham; 53.2638°N 2.5758°W	The battlemented tower of a stone Gothic church	The tower dates from the 15th century, and the remainder of this Perpendicular church from the following century. A restoration was carried out in 1853–55 by Anthony Salvin, which included work on the roof of the nave, followed by further work in 1877 by John Douglas, when a porch and a vestry were added. The church is constructed in sandstone with slate roofs.
St Bartholomew	Wilmslow; 53.3301°N 2.2296°W	A stone Gothic church with a pinnacled tower	Most of the present church is the result of remodelling an earlier church on the site, work that began in about 1490. The chancel was rebuilt in 1522. The architectural style is mainly Perpendicular, with some Decorated features. Under the chancel is a crypt chapel dating from about 1320. The Hawthorne Chapel was added in 1700. There were three 19th-century restorations, the first of which was by W .H. Brakspear in 1862–63. That was followed by the work of J. S. Crowther in 1877–78, which included the addition of a vestry, and finally by that of Bodley and Garner in 1898.
St Oswald	Winwick; 53.4308°N 2.5979°W	A stone Gothic church with a tower on the left capped by a recessed spire	The oldest parts of the church are the bases of the north arcades, which date from the early 13th century. There were additions and alterations during the 14th and 16th centuries. The south porch was added in 1720, and the south arcade was rebuilt in 1836 by John Palmer. In 1847–49 A. W. N. Pugin rebuilt the chancel and the sanctuary. The church was restored in 1869 by Paley and Austin, who also rebuilt the spire. Many of the furnishings in the chancel, sanctuary and vestry are by Pugin.
