= Holmes Chapel =

Village in Cheshire, England

Coordinates: 53.204°N 2.353°W

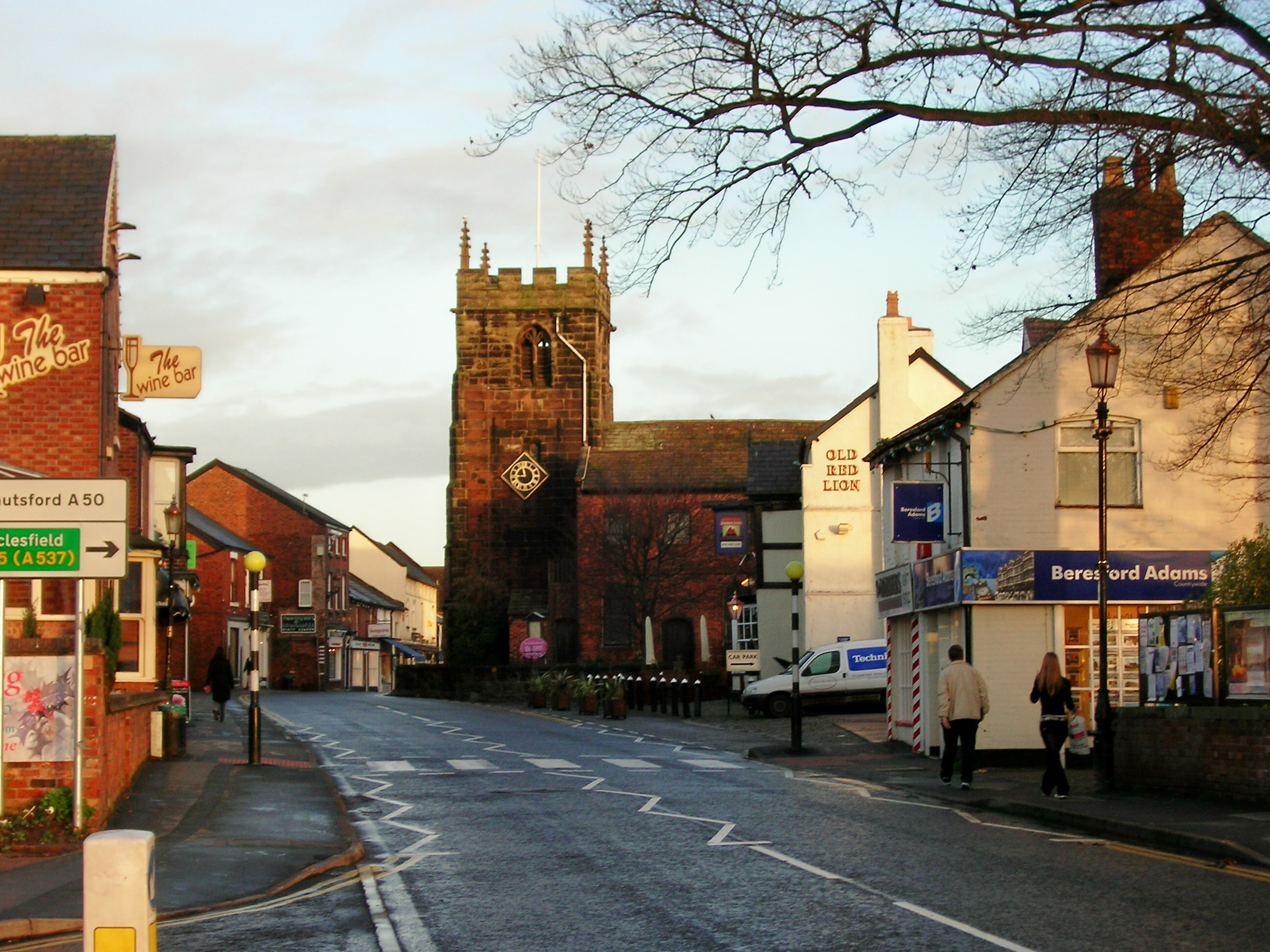
- St Luke’s Church, Holmes Chapel

- Location within Cheshire
- Population: 6,700
- OS grid reference: SJ765675
- Civil parish: Holmes Chapel
- Unitary authority: Cheshire East
- Ceremonial county: Cheshire
- Region: North West
- Country: England
- Sovereign state: United Kingdom
- Post town: CREWE
- Postcode district: CW4
- Dialling code: 01477
- Police: Cheshire
- Fire: Cheshire
- Ambulance: North West
- UK Parliament: Congleton

Holmes Chapel is a village and civil parish in Cheshire, England, 8 miles (13 km) north of Crewe and 21 miles (34 km) south of Manchester; Swettenham Meadows Nature Reserve lies 3 miles (4.8 km) east of the village and Goostrey lies to the north. The population of the village was 6,700 at the 2021 census.

== History ==
Cotton Hall, where John Cotton was resident in 1400, remained the family seat until the 18th century when Daniel Cotton married into the Booths of Twemlow; a cadet branch of the family were created baronets and then Viscounts Combermere. Cotton Hall dates from at least the 15th century, with some additions in the 17th, 19th and 20th centuries. A farm and estate, just off Middlewich Road, Cotton Hall is now listed Grade II* under the Planning (Listed Buildings and Conservation Areas) Act 1990, as amended, for its special architectural or historic interest.

== Amenities ==
The village has a number of public houses. There is a major supermarket (Aldi), several smaller supermarkets, a precinct, and numerous outlets including a fish and chip shop, off licence, pizzeria, estate agent, a chemist, a library and a bakery. There is a GP practice on London Road.

The town has one secondary school, Holmes Chapel Comprehensive School, and two primary schools: Holmes Chapel Primary School and Hermitage Primary School.

In May 2025 Holmes Chapel Zoo opened its doors to the public; a new small zoo that offers encounters and experiences to get hands on with their animals.

== Geography ==
Holmes Chapel, set within the Cheshire Plain, lies on the mid-reaches of the River Dane as it meanders its way around the north end of the village. The village is within the Unitary Authority district of Cheshire East, and used to be administered by Congleton borough.

Holmes Chapel has been twinned with Bessancourt, France, since 1980.

== Points of interest ==
St Luke's Church was built in about 1430. Originally half-timbered, the brick walls encasing the nave and chancel are later additions. It was designated a Grade I listed building on 14 February 1967.

== Transport ==
Holmes Chapel railway station is sited on the Crewe-Manchester Line, which is a spur of the West Coast Main Line. Northern operates hourly stopping services between Manchester Piccadilly and Crewe, making the village convenient for commuters.

The village is served by two bus routes; both are operated by D&G Bus:

- 42: Crewe to Congleton (Monday to Saturday)
- 319: Sandbach to Goostrey (Monday and Thursday).

Junction 18 of the M6 motorway serves both Holmes Chapel and nearby Middlewich.

== Notable people ==
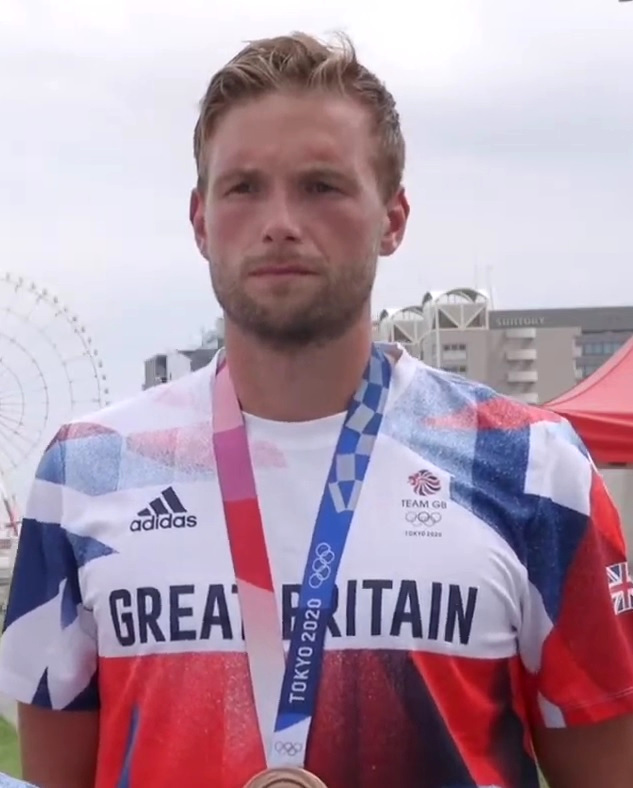
Thomas Ford, 2021

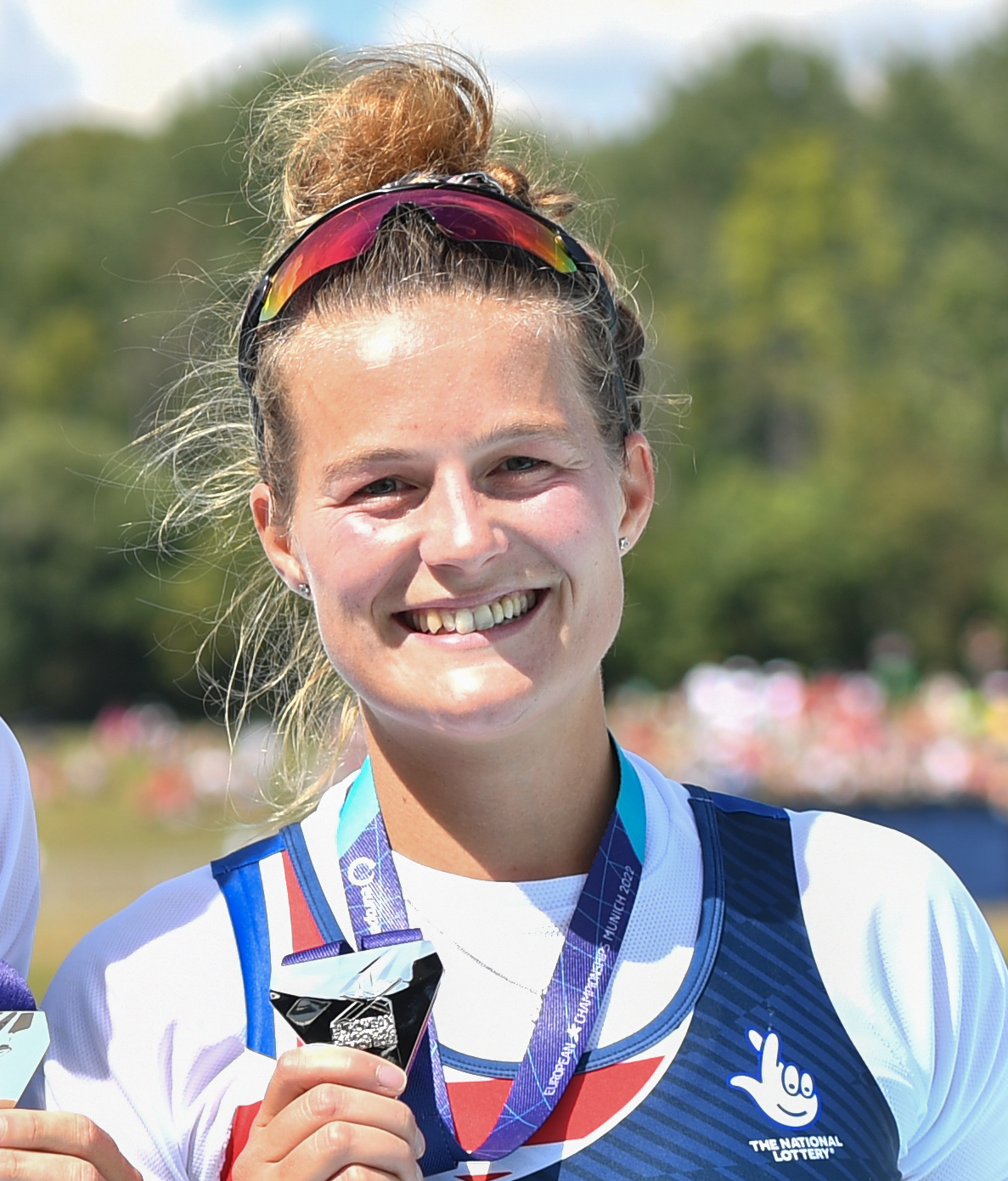
Emily Ford, 2022

- Major Philip Glazebrook (1880 at Twemlow Hall – 1918), Conservative MP for Manchester South until he was killed in WW1.
- Cathy Stonehouse (born 1966), poet and writer; has lived in Vancouver, Canada, since 1988.
- Harry Styles (born 1994), singer and former member of boy band One Direction, grew up locally.

=== Sports ===
- Sir Henry Cotton (1907–1987), golfer, winner of The Open Championship in 1934, 1937 and 1948.
- Shirley Strong (born 1958), 100 metres hurdler, silver medallist at the 1984 Summer Olympics.
- Andy Porter (born 1968), footballer, played 451 games including 357 for Port Vale F.C.
- Seth Johnson (born 1979), footballer, played 257 games, including 91 for Crewe Alexandra F.C..
- Dean Ashton (born 1983), footballer, played 248 games, including 158 for Crewe Alexandra F.C.
- Thomas Ford (born 1992), rower, team bronze and gold medallist at the 2020 and 2024 Summer Olympics in the men's eight event.
- Emily Ford (born 1994), rower, team bronze medallist at the 2024 Summer Olympics women's eight event.
- Tom Lowery (born 1997), footballer, played 190 games, including 151 for Crewe Alexandra F.C.

== See also ==
- Listed buildings in Holmes Chapel
