= Buerton, Cheshire East =

Village in Cheshire, England

Coordinates: 52.988°N 2.471°W

Buerton
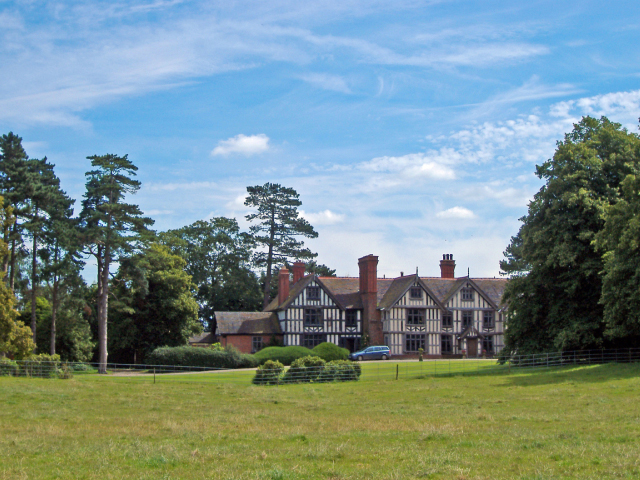
- Highfields, Buerton

- Location within Cheshire
- Population: 503 (2011)
- OS grid reference: SJ685435
- Civil parish: Buerton
- Unitary authority: Cheshire East
- Ceremonial county: Cheshire
- Region: North West
- Country: England
- Sovereign state: United Kingdom
- Post town: CREWE
- Postcode district: CW3
- Dialling code: 01270
- Police: Cheshire
- Fire: Cheshire
- Ambulance: North West
- UK Parliament: Chester South and Eddisbury

Buerton is a village (at SJ685435) and civil parish in the unitary authority of Cheshire East and the ceremonial county of Cheshire, England, about 7 miles south of the town of Nantwich and 1½ miles east of the village of Audlem, on the border with Shropshire. The parish also includes the small settlements of Hankins Heys, Moblake, Pinder's End and Three Wells, as well as parts of Chapel End, College Fields, Kinsey Heath, Longhill, Raven's Bank, Sandyford and Woolfall. In 2001, the total population was a little under 500, which had increased marginally to 503 at the 2011 Census. Nearby villages include Adderley, Audlem, Bridgemere, Hankelow, Hatherton, Hunsterson and Woore.

== History ==
Buerton appears in the Domesday survey as Burtune; it was then held by William Malbank, who held much of the land in the Nantwich hundred, and had a hawk's eyrie. In 1804, it formed part of the estate of the Earl of Grosvenor. The village had a windmill in 1653; the surviving building just outside Buerton village dates from 1779 and was in use until 1880. A school was founded in Buerton village in 1871 by the British and Foreign School Society, and a Band of Hope lecture hall was built in 1885.

== Governance ==
Buerton is administered by the Buerton Parish Council. From 1974 the civil parish was served by Crewe and Nantwich Borough Council, which was succeeded on 1 April 2009 by the new unitary authority of Cheshire East. Buerton falls in the parliamentary constituency of Chester South and Eddisbury, which has been represented since the 2024 general election by Aphra Brandreth of the Conservative Party. It was previously part of the Eddisbury constituency, which since its establishment in 1983 had been held by the Conservative MPs Alastair Goodlad (1983–99), Stephen O'Brien (1999–2015), Antoinette Sandbach (2015–19) and Edward Timpson (2019–24).

== Geography, transport and economy ==
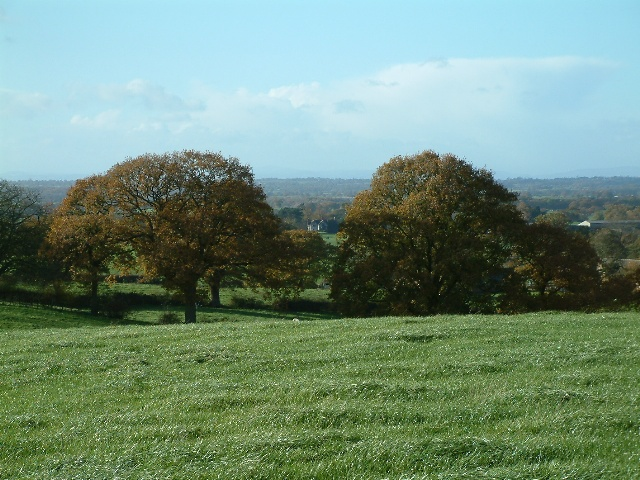
Farmland near Highfields in Buerton

The civil parish has a total area of 2,981 acres (1,206 ha). The terrain is gently undulating, with a high point of 145 metres at SJ706414 near the Shropshire border, south of College Fields. The area is predominantly rural, with the major land use being agricultural. Cheese remains a product of the parish. Several small areas of woodland are located within the civil parish, including Brick-kiln Wood, Brook Plantation, Fox Covert, Long Wood and The Ox Leasow. Birchall Brook forms part of the north-eastern parish boundary; several unnamed brooks run through the parish and there are many scattered small meres and ponds.

The A525 (Woore Road) runs east–west through the parish from Audlem to Woore in Shropshire. On or near the western boundary of the parish, Kettle Lane runs southwards from the A525 through Kinsey Heath, connecting with Paddock Lane and Bagley Lane within the parish of Audlem, while Longhill Lane runs northwards from the A525 through Moblake, Raven's Bank, Longhill and Woolfall towards Hankelow. Buerton village is centred on the junction of the A525 and Windmill Lane, which runs north-westwards to meet Longhill Lane at Longhill. Woodhouse Lane continues Kettle Lane, running broadly east–west through the south of the parish, becoming Bellaport Road in Shropshire. The National Cycle Network Regional Route 75 runs southwards from Audlem along the western parish boundary and then cuts broadly eastwards through the south of the parish, following Kettle and Woodhouse Lanes.

== Demography ==
In 2006, the total population of the civil parish was estimated as 480. The 2001 census recorded a population of 492, in 189 households. The historical population figures were 405 (1801), 444 (1851), 408 (1901) and 405 (1951).

== Places of worship ==
A United Free Gospel Chapel in Buerton village dates from 1885. A former Wesleyan Methodist Chapel, also in Buerton village, dates from 1891; it closed in 1975.

== Other landmarks ==
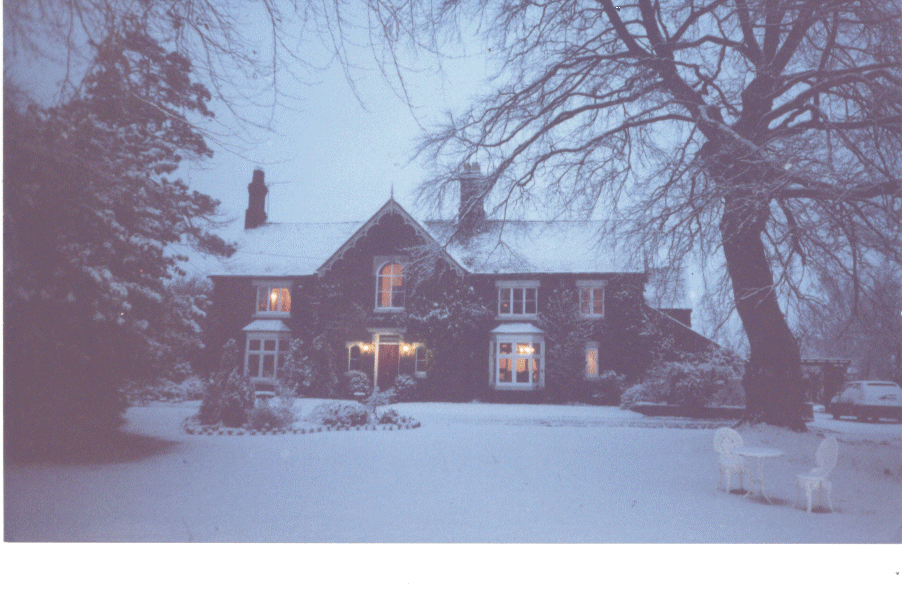
Buerton House, Buerton

The timber-framed country house of Highfields at SJ674409 dates from 1615 and was built for the Dodds family; it is listed at grade I. Woodhouse Farmhouse is a grade-II*-listed, red-brick farmhouse on Woodhouse Lane, dating from the late 17th or early 18th century; the garden wall and gatepiers of the farmhouse are also listed at grade II. Smithy House and Dairy House, both on Woore Road, are timber-framed former farmhouses with brick infill, dating originally from the 17th century with 19th-century additions; both are listed at grade II. Buerton Old House in Buerton village dates from the 17th century. Buerton House was originally Tythe Barn Farm, and its Edwardian brickwork conceals a much older core. Kynsal Lodge, off Kettle Lane, is a red-brick country house dating from around 1850. Its stables block is of the same date; both are listed at grade II.

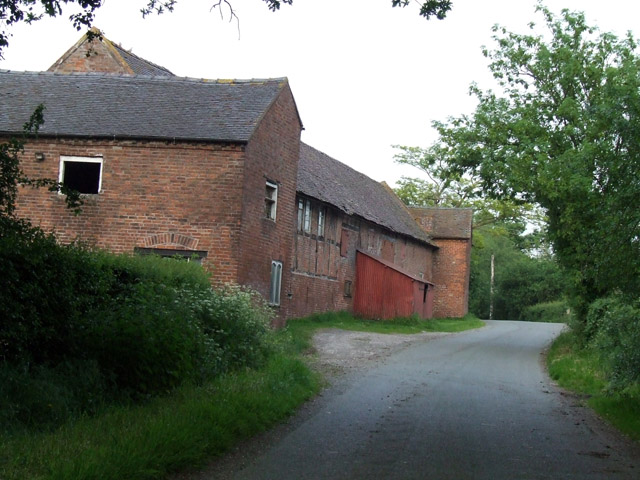
Woodhouse Farm barn

The brick body of Buerton Old Windmill stands on Windmill Lane; dated 1779, it is listed at grade II. The former school building in Buerton village dates from 1885 and was originally a Band of Hope lecture hall. A war memorial was located on the front of the former school. Several farm buildings are listed at grade II. There are two timber-framed barns with brick infill; that at Woodhouse Farm dates from the 16th or 17th century, while that at Dairy House dates from the 17th century. An early-19th-century red-brick farm building at Malt Kiln Farm on Woore Road is also listed.

== Education ==
Buerton Primary School in Buerton village closed in 2006. The parish falls within the catchment areas of Audlem St James CE Primary School in Audlem and Brine Leas High School in Nantwich.

== See also ==
- Listed buildings in Buerton, Cheshire East
