= Eginton =

Eginton is a surname. Notable people with the surname include:

- Francis Eginton (1737–1805), English glass painter
- Francis Eginton (1775–1823), English engraver
- Warren William Eginton (1924–2019), American judge
