= Hankelow =

Village in Cheshire, England

Coordinates: 53°00′20″N 02°29′29″W

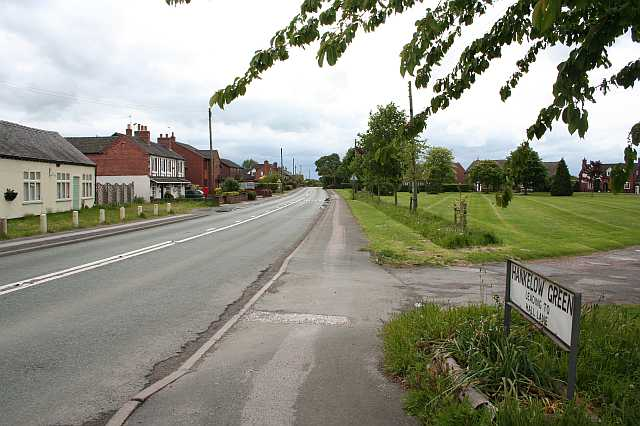
- The centre of Hankelow village on the A529, showing the village green and the White Lion (extreme left)

- Location within Cheshire
- Population: 261 (2011)
- OS grid reference: SJ671454
- Civil parish: Hankelow
- Unitary authority: Cheshire East
- Ceremonial county: Cheshire
- Region: North West
- Country: England
- Sovereign state: United Kingdom
- Post town: CREWE
- Postcode district: CW3
- Dialling code: 01270
- Police: Cheshire
- Fire: Cheshire
- Ambulance: North West
- UK Parliament: Chester South and Eddisbury

Hankelow is a village and civil parish in the unitary authority of Cheshire East and the ceremonial county of Cheshire, England. The village lies on the A529, around 1.25 miles (2.0 km) north east of Audlem and 4.5 miles (7.2 km) south of Nantwich. The civil parish has an area 369 hectares (910 acres) and also includes the small settlement of The Dell and part of Corbrook, with a total population of just over 260 in 2011. Nearby villages include Aston, Broomhall Green, Sound, Hatherton and Buerton in Cheshire and Woore in Shropshire.

Hankelow is first documented in the 13th century, and the village historically had a school, two chapels, two public houses, a water mill, post office, shop and other facilities. Only a Methodist chapel – also used as a community centre – remained open in 2020. Two buildings are listed at grade II*: the 16th-century Ball Farmhouse and the 18th-century Hankelow Hall. Outside the village, the civil parish is predominantly rural and agricultural. The River Weaver runs in the west of the parish, and there is a small area of probable ancient woodland in the north east.

== History ==
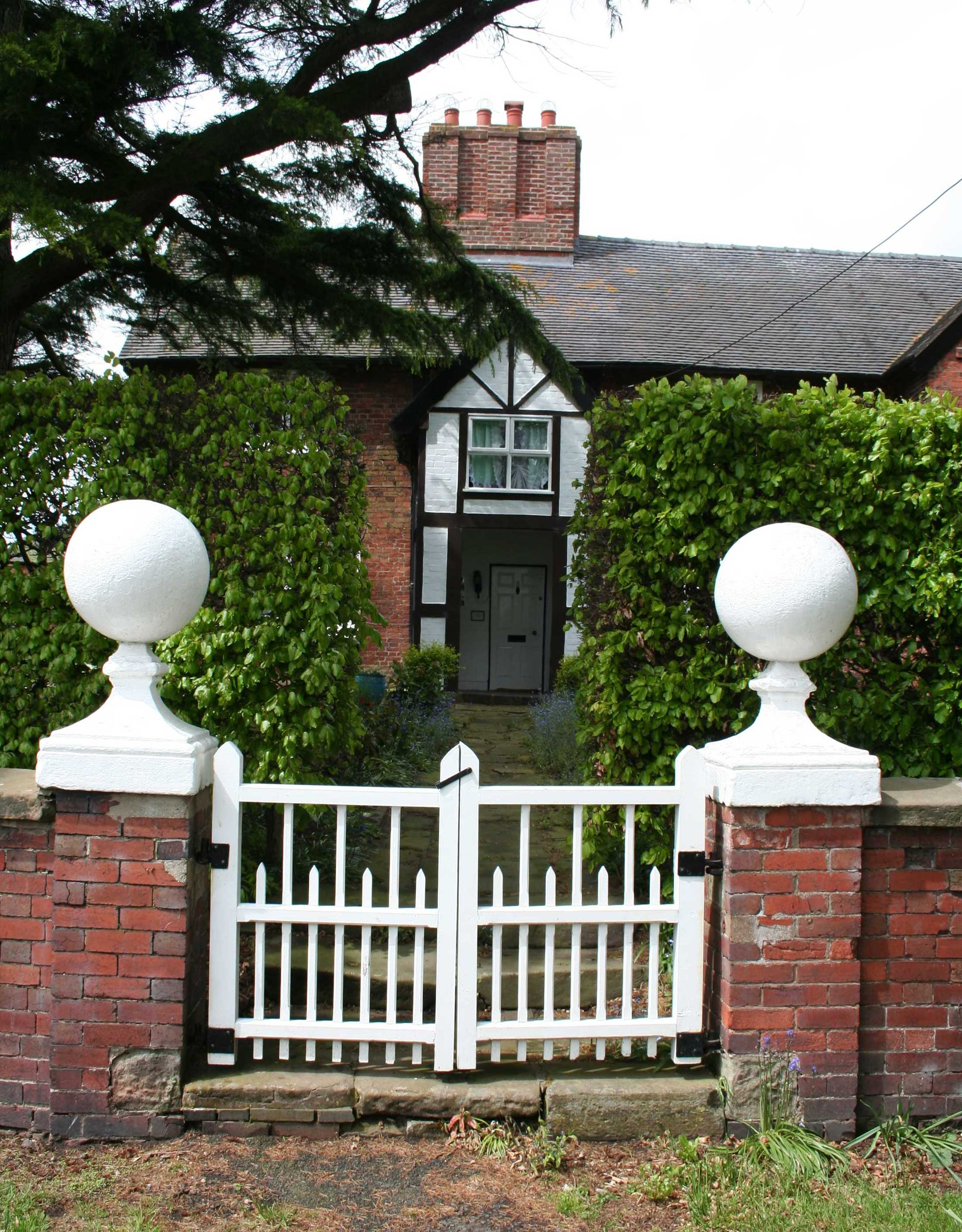
Ball Farmhouse, one of the parish's oldest buildings

The name Hankelow is first recorded in the 13th century and may refer to "Haneca's mound". It does not have a separate entry in the Domesday survey, and was owned by Richard de Vernon, who held Audlem and other local manors. Early variants include "Hunkelowe" and "Honkelowe". Richard de Hunkelowe was recorded as a bailiff of the Warmundstrou Hundred in the late 14th century.

Later prominent local families include the Hassalls and Wettenhalls. Richard Hassall of Ball Farm was appointed Sergeant-at-law in 1511 and the deputy Justice of Chester in 1540. Ball Farm may have been used as a district court, denoted by the prominent balls topping its gateposts. A hall is mentioned in 1369, and timber framing and wattle and daub were incorporated into the present Georgian Hankelow Hall, which was built for Gabriel Wettenhall in the early 18th century. It was remodelled for his son Nathaniel in 1755–57 by the local architect, William Baker of Highfields, Buerton. The hall passed to Edward Tomkinson when Nathaniel Wettenhall died. It fell into disrepair after being damaged by fire in the 1960s, and has been undergoing renovation since 1989. Hankelow Court dates from 1875 and was used to house army officers during the Second World War.

A water mill has stood on the River Weaver, on the site of the present Hankelow Mill, since around 1700. In 1882, a steam engine was added and the mill closed in 1940. A Wesleyan Methodist chapel was constructed in Hankelow village in 1838, and in the late 19th century there were two Methodist chapels in the parish. There were two public houses: the Greyhound (around 1770–1900) and the White Lion, which dates from the early 19th century. A school was built by the village green in the 1870s, which was also used as a church; it closed in 1970 and was later demolished. The village also had a post office, smithy, garage and shop in the 1950s and 1960s; all these facilities have closed, as has the White Lion.

== Governance ==
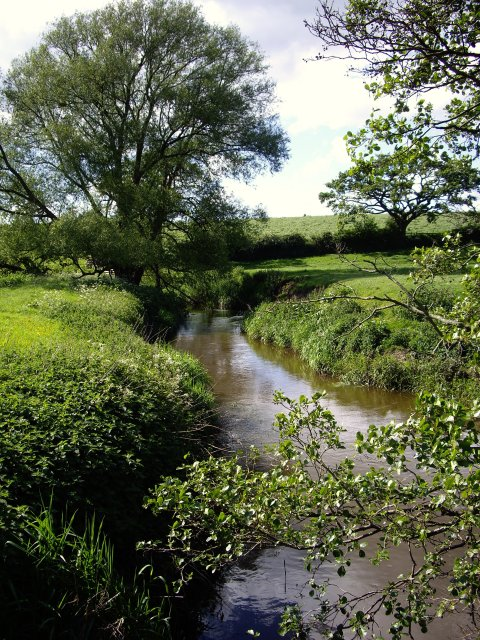
River Weaver from the South Cheshire Way

Historically, Hankelow was a township within the ancient parish of Audlem; it has been a civil parish since 1866. It is administered by Hankelow Parish Council. From 1974 Hankelow was served by Crewe and Nantwich Borough Council, which was succeeded on 1 April 2009 by the new unitary authority of Cheshire East. Hankelow was formerly part of the Crewe and Nantwich parliamentary constituency; following parliamentary boundary reviews the civil parish transferred to the Eddisbury constituency in 2008 and the Chester South and Eddisbury constitutuency in 2024.

== Geography, ecology and transport ==
The civil parish has an area of 369 hectares (910 acres). Adjacent parishes include Austerson (north), Hatherton (north east), Hunsterson (east), Buerton (south east), Audlem (south), Newhall (south west) and Coole Pilate (west). The A529 runs north east to south west through the civil parish, and the River Weaver runs north–south in the west, forming parts of the western and northern boundaries. Its tributary Birchall Brook forms part of the north-eastern boundary. The Shropshire Union Canal runs broadly north–south immediately to the west of the parish, with a very short section cutting through the western corner. Longhill Lane runs southeastwards to Woolfall from the A529, connecting with Longhill in Buerton parish. Hall Lane runs northwest from the A529 to Ball Farm and then turns northwards to serve Hankelow Hall. Monks Lane runs southwards from Longhill Lane into the parish of Audlem. The South Cheshire Way long-distance footpath crosses the parish east–west.

Hankelow village is centred at the crossroads of the A529 with Longhill Lane and Hall Lane, by the White Lion Hotel. The village extends around the triangle of the A529 with Hall Lane and Old School Lane to the west of the A529; Hankelow Green fills this triangle. The settlement also extends along Longhill Lane to the east of the A road. Hankelow village stands on a low eminence at an elevation of around 70 metres (230 ft) – a high point of 71 metres (233 ft) lies on Longhill Lane, a little to the south east of the village – and the ground slopes gently downwards in all directions. The lowest elevation of around 40–45 metres (131–148 ft) occurs in the valleys of the Weaver in the west and Birchall Brook in the north.

Outside Hankelow village, the area is rural and predominantly agricultural. The terrain is characterised by Cheshire Wildlife Trust as mainly "Lower Farms and Wood", with some "East Lowland Plain". There is a pond on Hankelow Green, and multiple small meres or ponds are scattered across the parish. A traditional orchard is found at Monk's Hall Farm, and there are several small areas of woodland, including Chestnut Wood, Blackthorn Wood, Oak Wood, Rookery Wood and Lodge Wood, all on or near Birchall Brook, as well as Brinepits Wood, Hankelow Fox Covert and Mill Plantation. Rookery, Blackthorn and Oak Woods are marked on tithe maps and probably represent ancient woodland. The northern parish boundary, parts of the southern and eastern boundaries, and the ribbon along the River Weaver form wildlife corridors, and a corridor links Rookery Wood with the Weaver. A substantial area of the civil parish is described as having moderate ecological value, and there is a small area of high ecological value around Rookery and Oak Woods in the north east, which forms part of a wider area centred around Birchall Moss in the adjacent parish of Hatherton, identified as being key for wildlife.

== Demography ==
According to the 2001 census, the parish had a population of 272, reducing slightly to 261 in 116 households at the 2011 census. The modern population is similar to the 19th-century peak and an increase compared with that of the early 20th century; historical population figures are 207 (1801), 253 (1851), 266 (1871), 210 (1901), 175 (1931) and 193 (1951). In the 2011 census, 98.9% were of white ethnicity, with 0.4% Asian, 0.4% Caribbean and 0.4% of mixed ethnicity. At that date, 66.7% reported being Christian and 0.4% Buddhist, with 0.4% reporting another (unspecified) religion.

The 2011 census found that 64.9% of residents aged 16–74 years were in part- or full-time employment, while 25.3% were retired, 4.1% were students, 3.6% were carers or homemakers, 1.5% were unemployed, and 0.5% were sick or disabled. The main employment sectors were wholesale or retail trade (15.5%), education (11.6%), health and social work (10.9%), construction (10.1%), professional, scientific and technical activities (9.3%), other unspecified (9.3%), accommodation and food service (7.0%), manufacturing (6.2%), and agriculture, forestry and fishing (5.4%). This contrasts with the situation in 1881, when more than 40% of men were agricultural workers.

== Landmarks ==
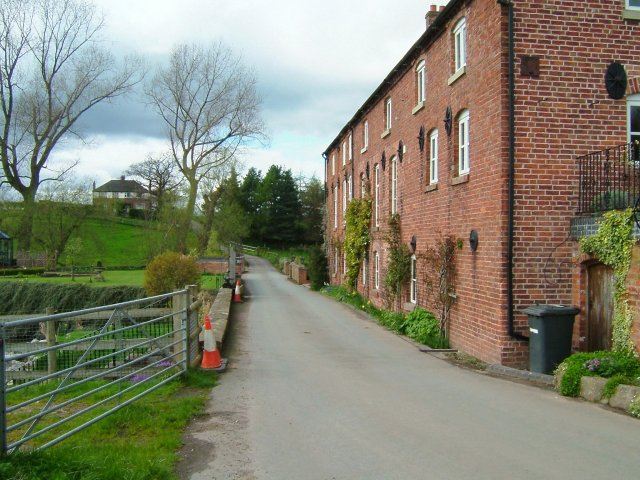
Hankelow Mill

There is a Wesleyan Methodist church in Hankelow village, which is also used as a community centre.

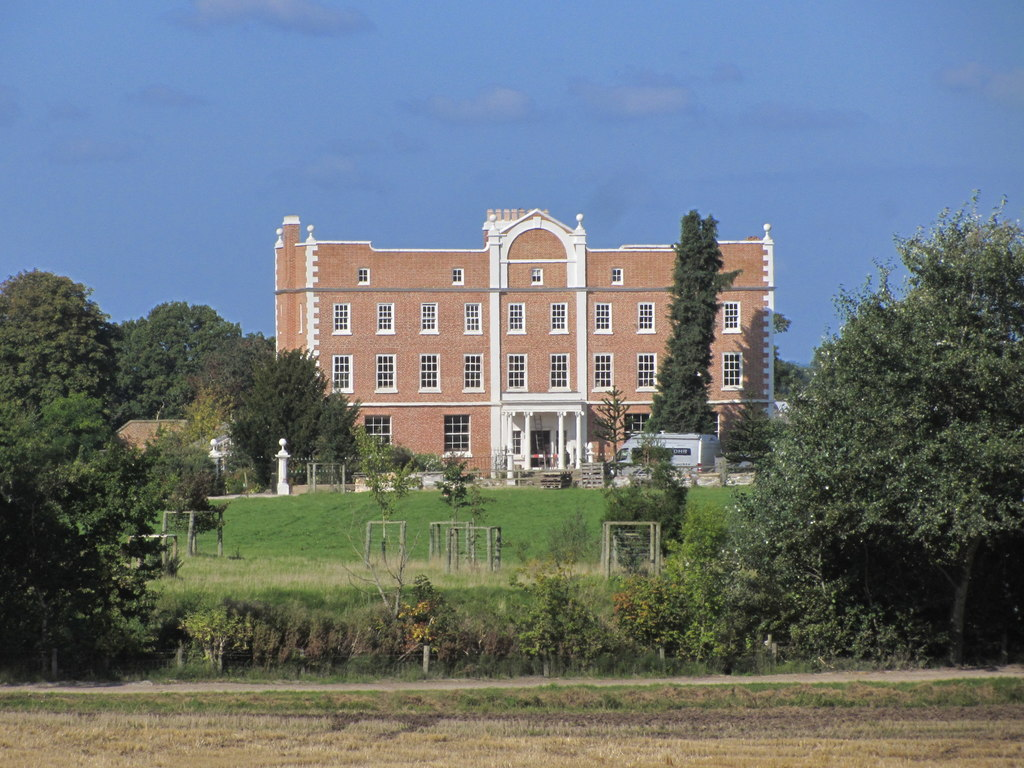
Hankelow Hall

Several listed buildings are located within the parish, two of which are designated as grade II*, the middle of the three grades, denoting "particularly important buildings of more than special interest". Ball Farmhouse on Hall Lane was originally a timber-framed building dating from 1510, and was partly replaced by red brick during the 19th century. Hankelow Hall off Hall Lane dates from the early 18th century, and also incorporates remnants of an earlier structure. It is a three-storey, ten-bay Georgian country house in red brick with stone dressings, with paired ashlar pilasters flanking the two central bays, a very high parapet decorated with ball finials, and a porch with Ionic columns. The building is described by Clare Hartwell and coauthors as "odd... with an idiosyncratic raised centre" and Nikolaus Pevsner calls attention to its "startlingly high" parapet.

Two farmhouses are listed at grade II, the lowest grade. The Green Farmhouse on Hankelow Green is a T-shaped building in red brick with a tiled roof, with five bays to the front façade, which dates from the early to mid-18th century. Hankelow Manor or Manor Farmhouse on Hall Lane is a three-storey red-brick building of three bays under a slate roof, dating from the late 18th or early 19th century. The unlisted Hankelow Court on Hall Lane was built in 1875 and extended in 1901; it features black-and-white timberwork. Hankelow Mill is a grade-II-listed former water mill on the River Weaver, now residential, dating from the early 19th century on the site of earlier mills. It is in red brick with three storeys under a slate roof, and features several cast-iron windows with 6×6 panes. The mill machinery is still present. A disused 19th-century road bridge over Birchall Brook in red brick with stone dressings is also listed.

=== Hankelow Court ===
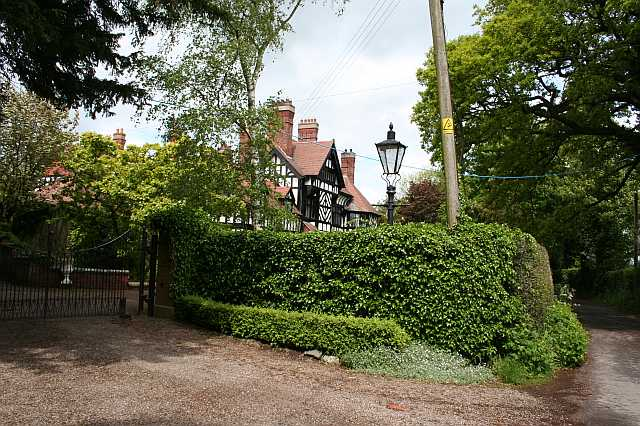
Hankelow Court, 2009 photograph

Hankelow Villa, Audlem, was built in 1875 for the cotton spinner Hilton Greaves (1822–1885). Later additions were carried out there by Joseph Swarbrick for William Lawrence Chew; Chew changed the name to Hankelow Court.

== Education ==
There are no educational facilities in modern Hankelow. The civil parish falls within the catchment areas of Brine Leas School in Nantwich, and Audlem St James Church of England Primary School.

== Sport ==
There is a thoroughbred racehorse named after the village. Hankelow is a 3 year old colt by Night of Thunder out of the mare Sagaciously. He was bought as a yearling by Karl, Kelly and Lucy Burke for 750,000 Guineas (£787,500) at Book 1 of the Tattersalls October Yearling Sales in Newmarket. He is trained in Middleham, North Yorkshire by Karl Burke and is owned by Sheikh Mohammed Obaid Al Maktoum, a cousin of Sheikh Mohammed bin Rashid Al Maktoum, the ruler of Dubai. Hankelow has won two of his three starts to date including a 1 1/4 length victory in the Group 3 Autumn Stakes at Newmarket in October 2025, starting as the 5/2 favourite. His next run is expected to be in the 2026 2000 Guineas, the first classic of the year held at Newmarket’s Rowley Mile. The individual responsible for naming the horse is unknown; however, it is understood that Sheikh Obaid granted naming opportunities to stable staff associated with his training yards prior to his death in 2025.

== See also ==
- Listed buildings in Hankelow
