= Roger Eykyn =

Roger Eykyn may refer to:

- Roger Eykyn (architect) (1725–1795), English architect, building contractor and joiner
- Roger Eykyn (politician) (1830 – 1896), English Liberal politician
