= Ball Farm =

Farmhouse in Hankelow, Cheshire, England

Coordinates: 53°00′26″N 02°29′44″W

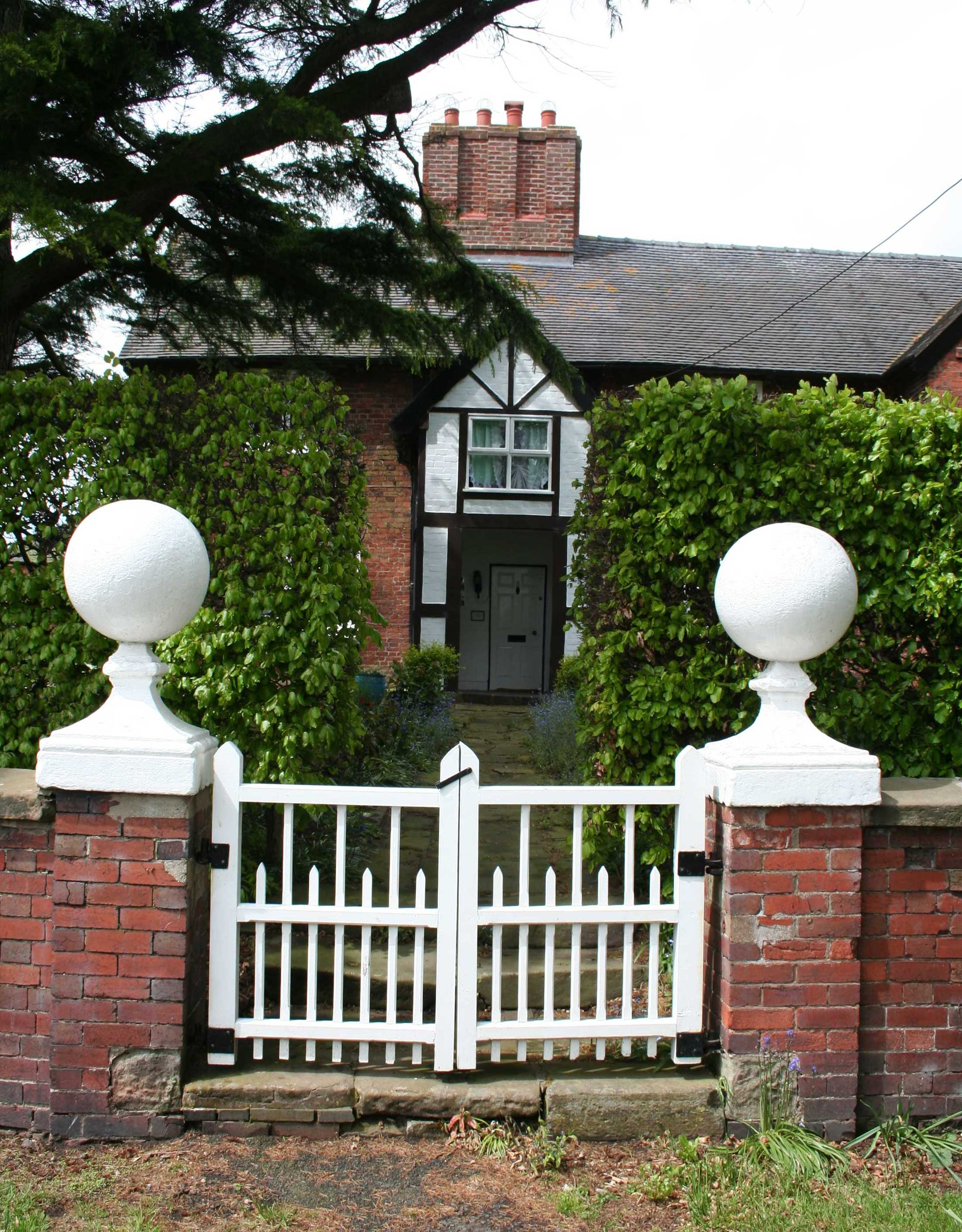
Ball Farmhouse, Hankelow

Ball Farm is the oldest surviving building in the village of Hankelow, near Audlem in Cheshire, England, and is thought to date from 1510. Most of its original timber frame was replaced by brick in the 19th century, but some close studding and small framing survives, as well as part of a mullioned-and-transomed window. Ball Farm was occupied by the Hassalls, a prominent local family, and might have once been used as a district court of justice. It is listed at grade II* by the Historic Buildings and Monuments Commission for England, the middle of the three grades, denoting "particularly important buildings of more than special interest".

== History ==
The Hassalls were a prominent family in Hankelow, holding the manor for many generations until the 17th century. The owner of Ball Farm, Richard Hassall of Hankelow, was made a Serjeant-at-law for the county town of Chester in 1511, a prestigious post appointed by the Crown which his father had held before him. He was appointed Nantwich's first Justice of the peace in 1535 or 1536 and deputy justice of Chester in 1540 (and according to some sources was serving as the Justice of Chester by 1540).

Ball Farm is often described as having been built in 1510; Historic England estimates its date as 16th or early 17th century. It is considered to be the oldest remaining building in Hankelow – although the 18th-century Hankelow Hall has a Tudor staircase and retains some internal fabric thought to be Jacobean in date – as well as among the oldest surviving non-ecclesiastical buildings in the ancient parish of Audlem in South Cheshire. The building may have once been used as a district court of justice, and the prominent balls topping its gateposts are said to symbolise "the weighing of justice". It was significantly altered in the early or mid-19th century, and extended later in that century and in the 20th century.

== Location ==
Ball Farm stands at SJ6685045663 by a right-angled bend on Hall Lane just to the north west of Hankelow village. The listing gives the address as "Hankelow Lane", which no longer exists. It is near Manor Farm, a grade-II-listed farmhouse of the late 18th or early 19th century, and Hankelow Court, a Black-and-white Revival house of 1875.

== Description ==
The farmhouse was originally a timber-framed building, but much of the external timber frame was replaced by red brick during the early or mid-19th century. There are two storeys with an attic, under a tiled roof. The four-bay front (south east) façade has a full-height gabled entrance porch to the left, and a wing to the right (north east) which also has a gable. There are two large four-flue chimneys, one above the porch and one to the right of the right-hand wing. Remnants of the timber frame to the front face survive around the entrance porch. Close studding remains on the north-east face of the right-hand wing on the first floor adjacent to the chimney, with a middle rail and a higher cross rail. The first-floor window on this side dates in part from the 16th or early 17th century; it has four wooden mullions and a transom.

The house was extended at the rear in the 19th and 20th centuries, in two separate wings. Some timber framing survives around these extensions, including part of one gable, small framing to a projecting wing with a diagonal brace, and close studding with a middle rail on the first floor between the two wings.

The interior has oak panelling in places, some of which has a linenfold design, as well as exposed beams to the ceiling, which are ovolo moulded. There is an inglenook fireplace. The oak staircase has large ball finials. There is a small ground-floor powder closet or wig room, with a powder cupboard. A plaster ceiling featuring leaf decoration is found in an upper-storey room.

== See also ==
- Listed buildings in Hankelow
- Grade II* listed buildings in Cheshire East
