= Dodd's Green =

Hamlet in Cheshire, England

Coordinates: 52°59′39″N 2°34′49″W

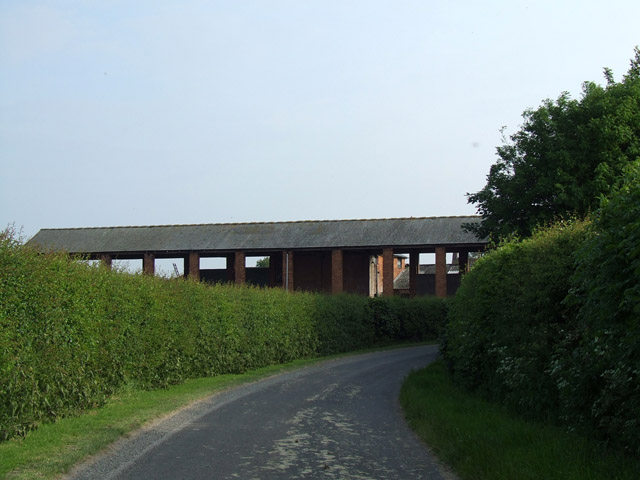
Building at Dodds Green Farm

Dodd's Green (also Dod's Green, Dodds Green and Doddsgreen) is a small settlement within the civil parish of Newhall in the Cheshire East division of the ceremonial county of Cheshire. It includes Dodds Green Farm and a cluster of nearby residential buildings as well as the former church of Doddsgreen Methodist Church; all are located on Dodd's Green Lane, which connects the A530 with the A525 (Whitchurch Road).

Some historical Ordnance Survey maps (such as the 1945 New Popular Edition) mark the settlement's centre at Grindley Green in the adjacent civil parish of Dodcott cum Wilkesley; others (such as the 1833 First Series) place it in the modern position. Nearby settlements include Newhall and Salesbrook.

The Wesleyan Methodist Church dates from 1835; it was combined with St Andrew's Methodist Church, Aston in 1985.
