= Salesbrook =

Coordinates: 53.000°N 2.575°W

- Location within Cheshire
- Population: 16
- Language: British English; Welsh
- Unitary authority: Cheshire East
- Ceremonial county: Cheshire
- Region: North West
- Country: England
- Sovereign state: United Kingdom
- Post town: NANTWICH
- Postcode district: CW5
- Dialling code: 01260
- Police: Cheshire
- Fire: Cheshire
- Ambulance: North West
- UK Parliament: Chester South and Eddisbury

Salesbrook (sometimes written 'Sales Brook' or archaically 'Sailsbrook'. Occasionally referred to by the Welsh version of the name Nant Acsiynau) is a small settlement in the parish of Newhall, near the village of Aston, in the ceremonial county of Cheshire and the unitary authority of Cheshire East in England. Nearby settlements include Aston by Wrenbury, Newhall, Barnett Brook and Dodd's Green.

== Description ==
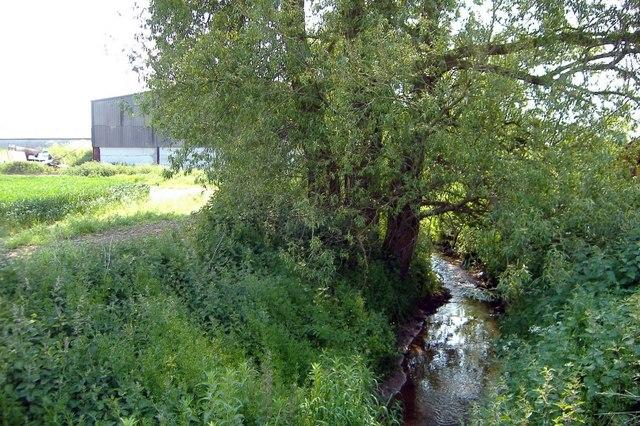
The eponymous brook near Salesbrook Farm

The settlement is centred on the Salesbrook brook, which Salesbrook Lane crosses at Salesbrook Bridge. The village consists of two main properties: Salesbrook Manor, and the bungalow. There is a row of council houses near the main road. Most of the surrounding fields are owned by the Shore family, who live at Salesbrook Farm. The surrounding land is flat (although it begins to slope gently upwards towards Newhall) and mostly used for arable farming. There is a small woodland nearby named Courts Gorse. The population, excluding Salesbrook Farm, was estimated at 16 in 2010.

== Governance ==
The hamlet is served locally by Newhall Parish council which meets at Aston. The council was served by the Crewe and Nantwich Borough Council until its abolition in 2009, since then it has been under the jurisdiction of Cheshire East Council. It is represented in the House of Commons as part of the Chester South and Eddisbury constituency.

== History ==
The settlement was part of the Combermere estate until the early 20th century when it was sold off to pay off the estate's mounting debts. Until the 1980s the surrounding land was owned by the Plant family.
