= Listed buildings in Newhall, Cheshire =

Newhall is a civil parish in Cheshire East, England. It contains 14 buildings that are recorded in the National Heritage List for England as designated listed buildings, all of which are at Grade II. This grade is the lowest of the three gradings given to listed buildings and is applied to "buildings of national importance and special interest". The parish contains the village of Aston, but is otherwise almost completely rural, and its listed buildings reflect this, including farmhouses and other houses. The Shropshire Union Canal runs through the parish, and there are two listed buildings associated with this, a bridge and a milepost. Also listed are a boundary stone, a telephone kiosk, and a lychgate.

Name and location	Photograph	Date	Notes
Brickwall Farmhouse; 52.98840°N 2.53374°W	—	17th century	The farmhouse is basically timber-framed with brick infill and has been rendered; the roof is tiled. The farmhouse has an H-shaped plan, and is in two storeys. At the sides are projecting gabled wings, and between these is a verandah. The windows are casements.
Cottage (adjacent to the telephone exchange(?)); 53.01655°N 2.57710°W	—	17th century	A timber-framed cottage with rendered infill, in a single storey with an attic. On the front is a brick porch, and to its right is a rectangular bay window; there is a similar bay window on the left side. In the upper floor is a gabled dormer. The windows are casements.
Hall O'Coole; 53.00688°N 2.55391°W	—	17th century	The farmhouse was altered and extended in the 19th century. The older part is timber-framed, and the later part is in pebbledashed brick; the roof is tiled. The house has a T-shaped plan, and is in two storeys. To the right of centre is a projecting wing with a jettied gable, and to the right of this is a wing with a French window and a bay window. The wing to the left is in brick, and contains a porch and French windows. The other windows are casements.
Hollin's Green Farmhouse; 53.00326°N 2.54215°W	—	17th century	The farmhouse is basically timber-framed, and has been encased in brick; it has a tiled roof. The farmhouse is in two storeys with a four-bay front, the left bay protruding forward and gabled, and containing a French window. The other windows are casements. At the rear is a timber-framed wing on a brick plinth with a jettied gable containing a moulded bressumer. Inside the farmhouse is an inglenook.
Kennelwood; 52.99717°N 2.59096°W	—	17th century	A house that was altered in the 20th century. It is mainly timber-framed with brick infill and partly in brick; it has a slate roof. The house has an H-shaped plan, and is in two storeys. The central range is in brick, and the lateral wings are gabled and timber-framed, the left wing having a jettied gable. The windows are 20th-century casements.
New Lodge; 52.99877°N 2.59095°W	—	17th century	A house that was altered in the 20th century. It is mainly timber-framed with brick infill and partly in brick; it has a slate roof. The house has an H-shaped plan, and is in two storeys. The central range is in brick, and the lateral wings are gabled and timber-framed, the left wing having a jettied gable. The windows are 20th-century casements.
West End Farmhouse; 53.01984°N 2.58382°W		17th century	A timber-framed farmhouse, partly rendered with a tiled roof and in two storeys. On the right is a gabled wing, and to the left are three bays with dormers in the upper floors. The windows are casements. Inside the farmhouse is an inglenook.
Aston House Farmhouse; 53.01933°N 2.58280°W		1662	An extension was added in the 19th century. The original part is timber-framed with a tiled roof and a gable facing the road. It is in two storeys, the upper floor and the gable both being jettied. The windows are casements, and the date is painted on the gable. To the right is the later extension in brick with a slate roof. It has two storeys, is in three bays, and contains sash windows.
Brown's Bank Farmhouse; 52.98335°N 2.52220°W	—	1759	The farmhouse is in brick with a tiled roof, and has two storeys and an attic. At the front on the left are three bays with a doorway, and to the right is a protruding gabled bay with two-light windows. Inside the farmhouse is an inglenook with a chamfered bressumer.
Pinnacle Farmhouse; 53.00533°N 2.52847°W	—	Early 19th century	A brick farmhouse in two storeys, with a symmetrical three-bay front. The central doorway is flanked by pilaster strips, and has a porch with a pediment. The windows are casements.
Canal milepost 53.00600°N 2.51984°W	—	Early 19th century	The milepost on the Shropshire Union Canal is in cast iron. It consists of a circular post with a domed top that carries a plate in three panels, inscribed with the distances in miles to Autherley Junction and Norbury Junction.
Bennett's Bridge; 53.00316°N 2.51886°W		1827–30	This is bridge number 80, an accommodation bridge over the Shropshire Union Canal, designed by Thomas Telford. It is built in brick, with a stone band and copings. The bridge consists of a single elliptical arch.
Lychgate, Aston Burial Ground; 53.01718°N 2.58192°W		c. 1919	The lychgate is a war memorial. It is timber-framed and has a gable with a decorated bargeboard; it stands on a brick base. The lychgate has a slated roof, and contains double gates. There are inscriptions on the tie-beams, the bressumers, and on wooden tablets.
Telephone kiosk 53.01897°N 2.58255°W		1935	A K6 type telephone kiosk, designed by Giles Gilbert Scott. Constructed in cast iron with a square plan and a dome, it has three unperforated crowns in the top panels.

== See also ==
- Listed buildings in Wrenbury cum Frith
- Listed buildings in Sound
- Listed buildings in Hankelow
- Listed buildings in Audlem
- Listed buildings in Dodcott cum Wilkesley
