= St Paul's Square, Birmingham =

Square in Birmingham, UK

Coordinates: 52.4852°N 1.9058°W

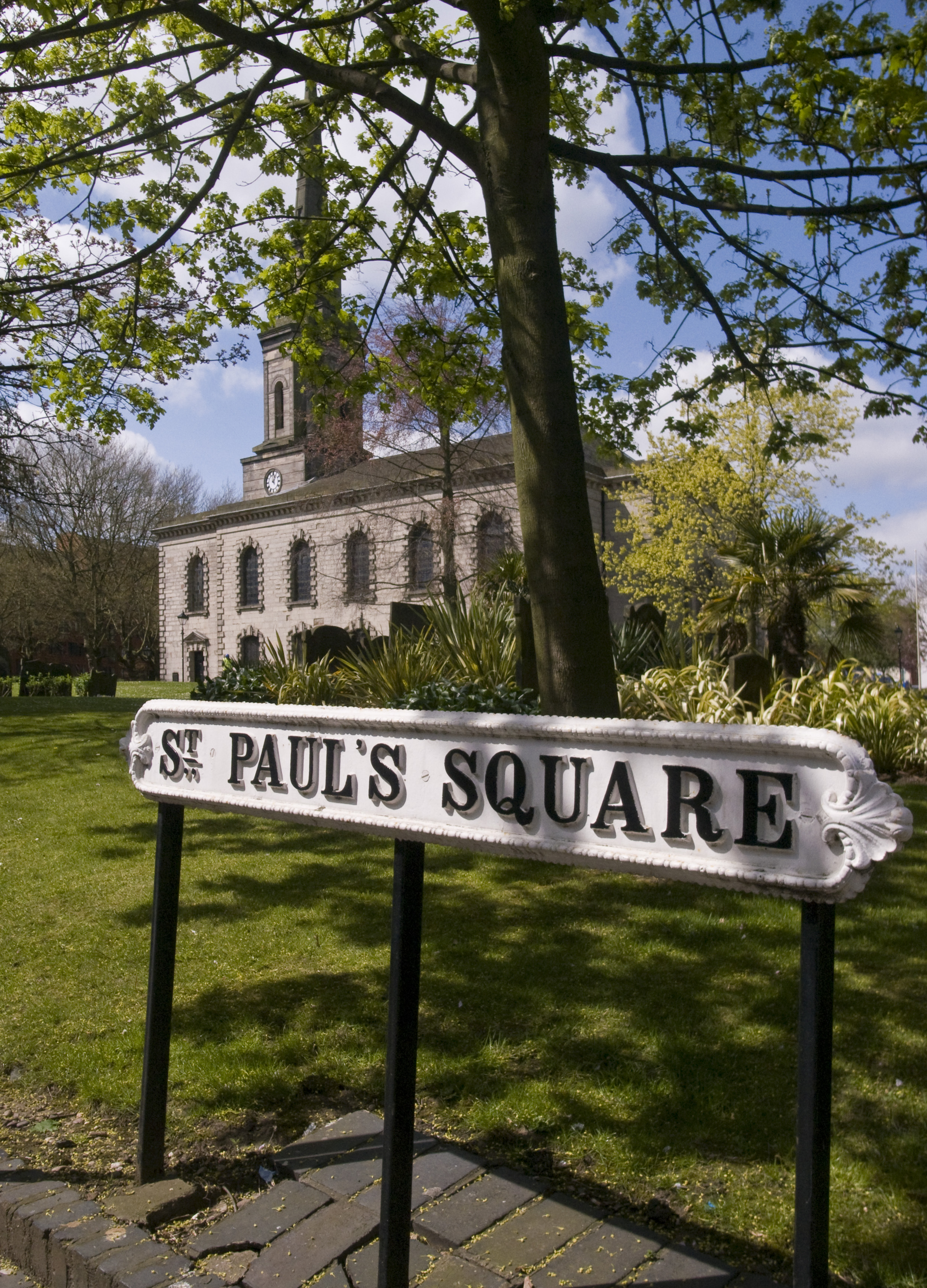
St Paul's Church in the middle of the square (with the historic spelling visible on a road sign)

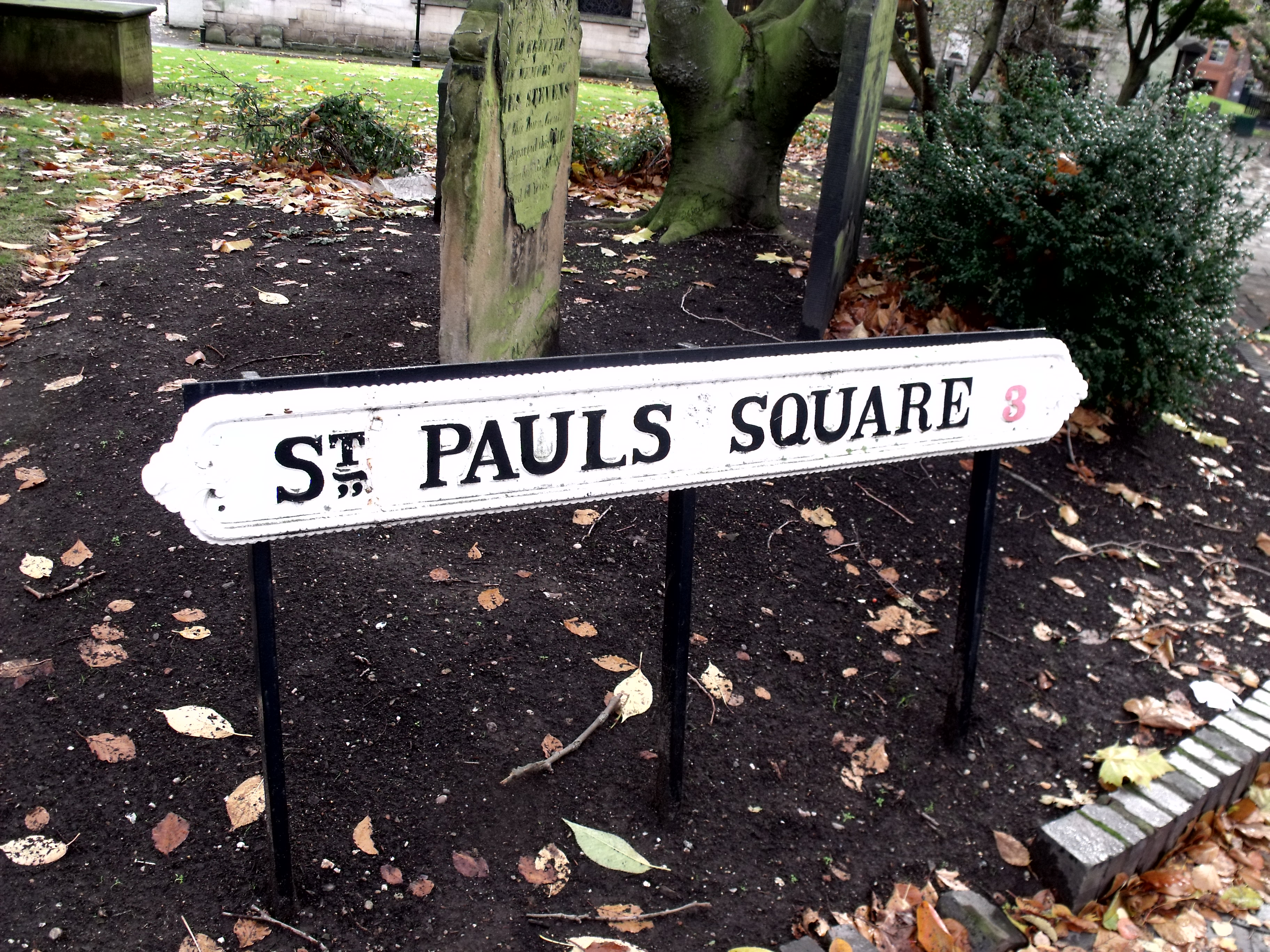
An alternate view of the square (with the modern spelling visible on a road sign)

St Paul's Square (also known as St Pauls Square) is a Georgian square in the Jewellery Quarter, Birmingham, England, named after the church at its centre. It is the last remaining Georgian Square in the city.

Built 1777–1779 on the Newhall estate of the Colmore family, it was an elegant and desirable location in the mid-nineteenth century. At the end of the nineteenth century the square was swallowed by workshops and factories, with the fronts of some buildings being pulled down to make shop fronts or factory entrances. Much restoration was done in the 1970s and many of the buildings are Grade II listed.

As well as bars, cafés and restaurants – which line the square's four sides – a number of apartment schemes have been built in the area. This includes a restoration of the façade of the Thomas Walker building, a former buckle maker, which fronts onto the square. St Paul's Club is situated in St Pauls Square. Formed in 1859, it is the Midlands' oldest private members club. The Royal Birmingham Society of Artists has its offices and gallery on premises just off the square.

St Pauls Square is served by St Paul's tram stop.

== St Paul's Church ==
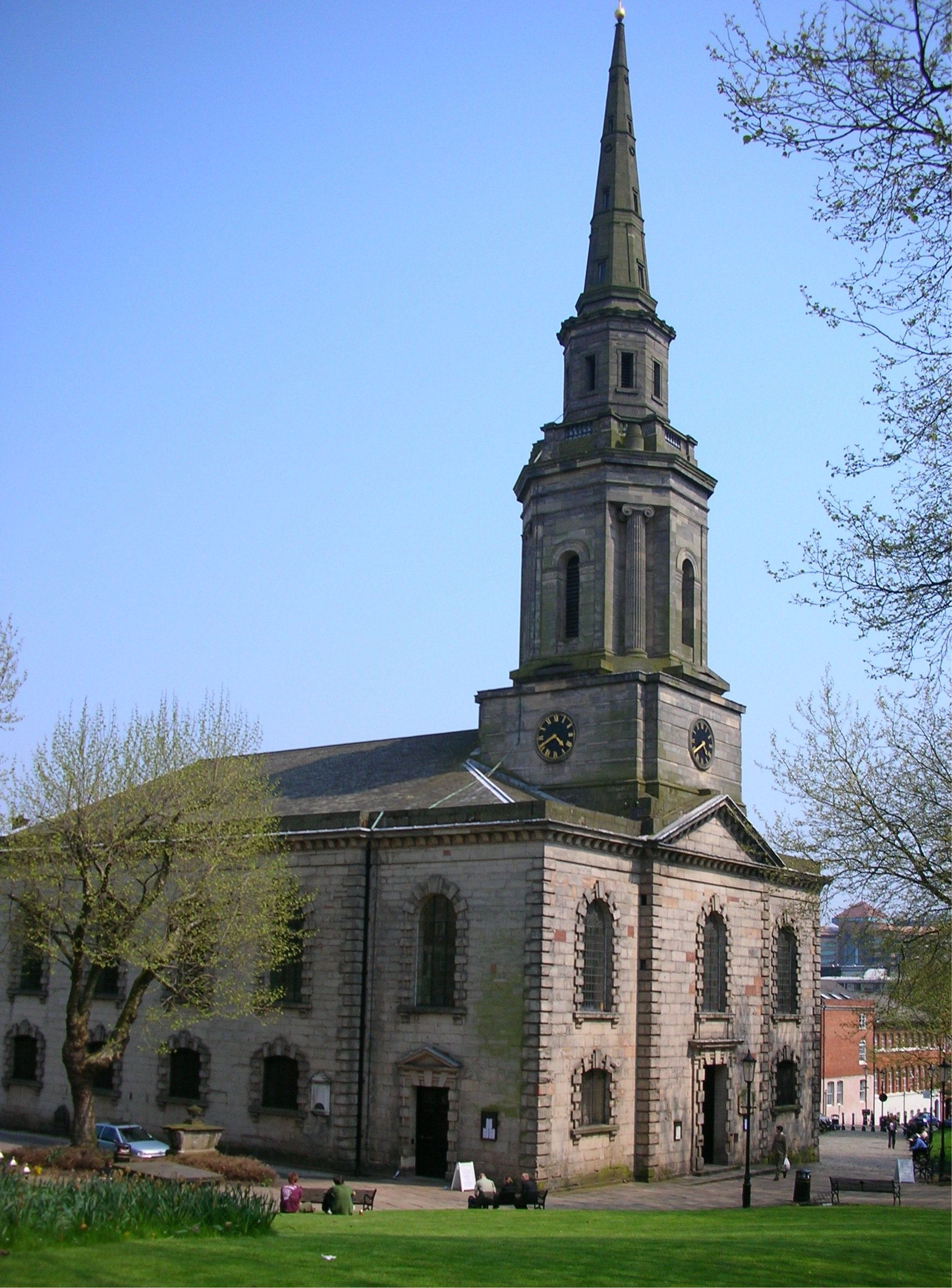
St Paul's Church

Designed by Roger Eykyn of Wolverhampton, building started in 1777, and the church was consecrated in 1779. It was built on land given by Charles Colmore from his Newhall estate. It was the church of Birmingham's early manufacturers and merchants – Matthew Boulton and James Watt had their own pews, which were bought and sold as commodities at that time.

It is a rectangular church, similar in appearance to St Martin in the Fields, London. The spire was added in 1823 by Francis Goodwin. The east window has an important 1791 stained-glass window designed by Benjamin West and made by Francis Eginton. It shows the Conversion of St Paul. The church is a Grade I listed building.

== Gallery ==
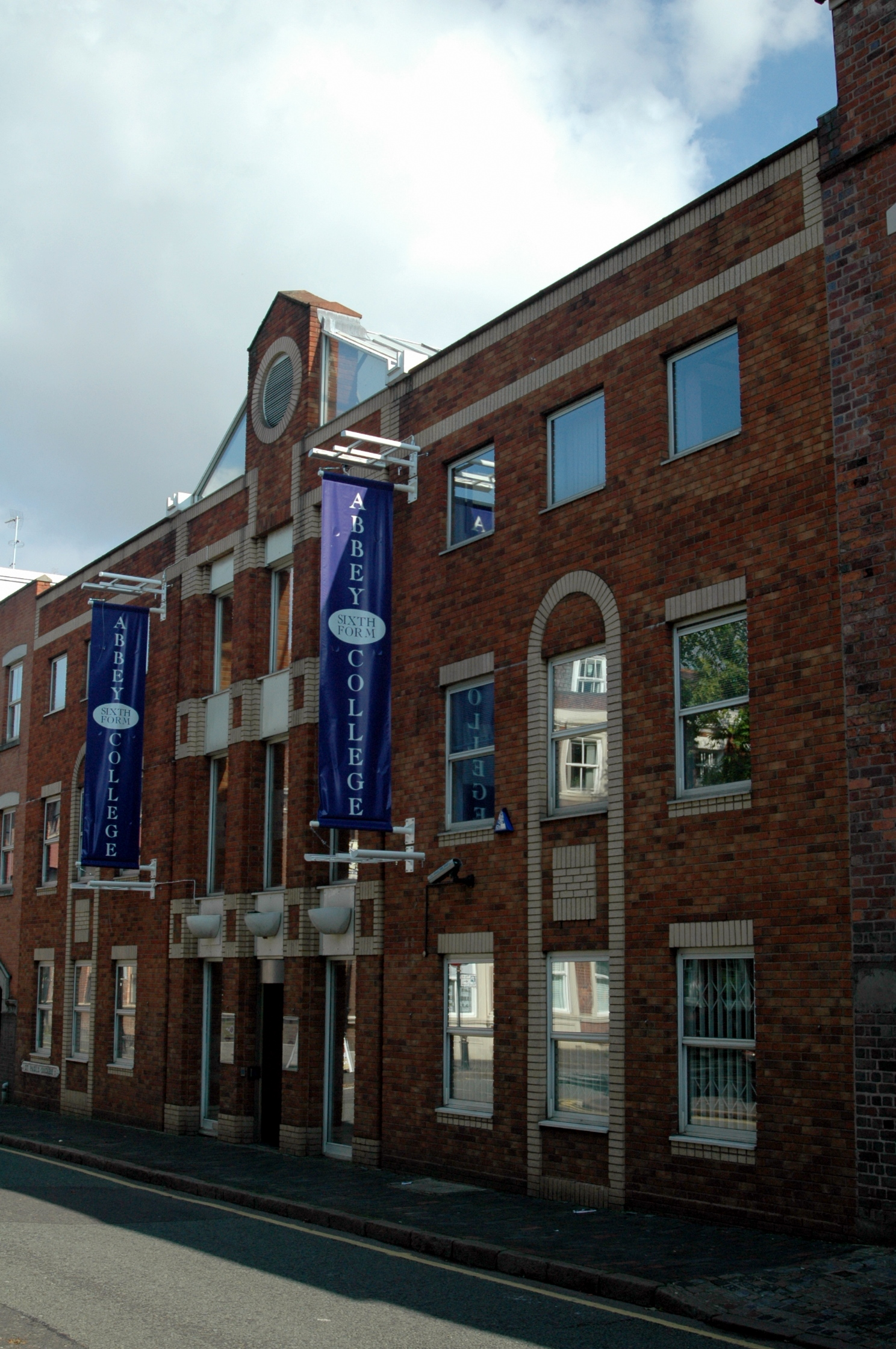
No 10: Abbey College

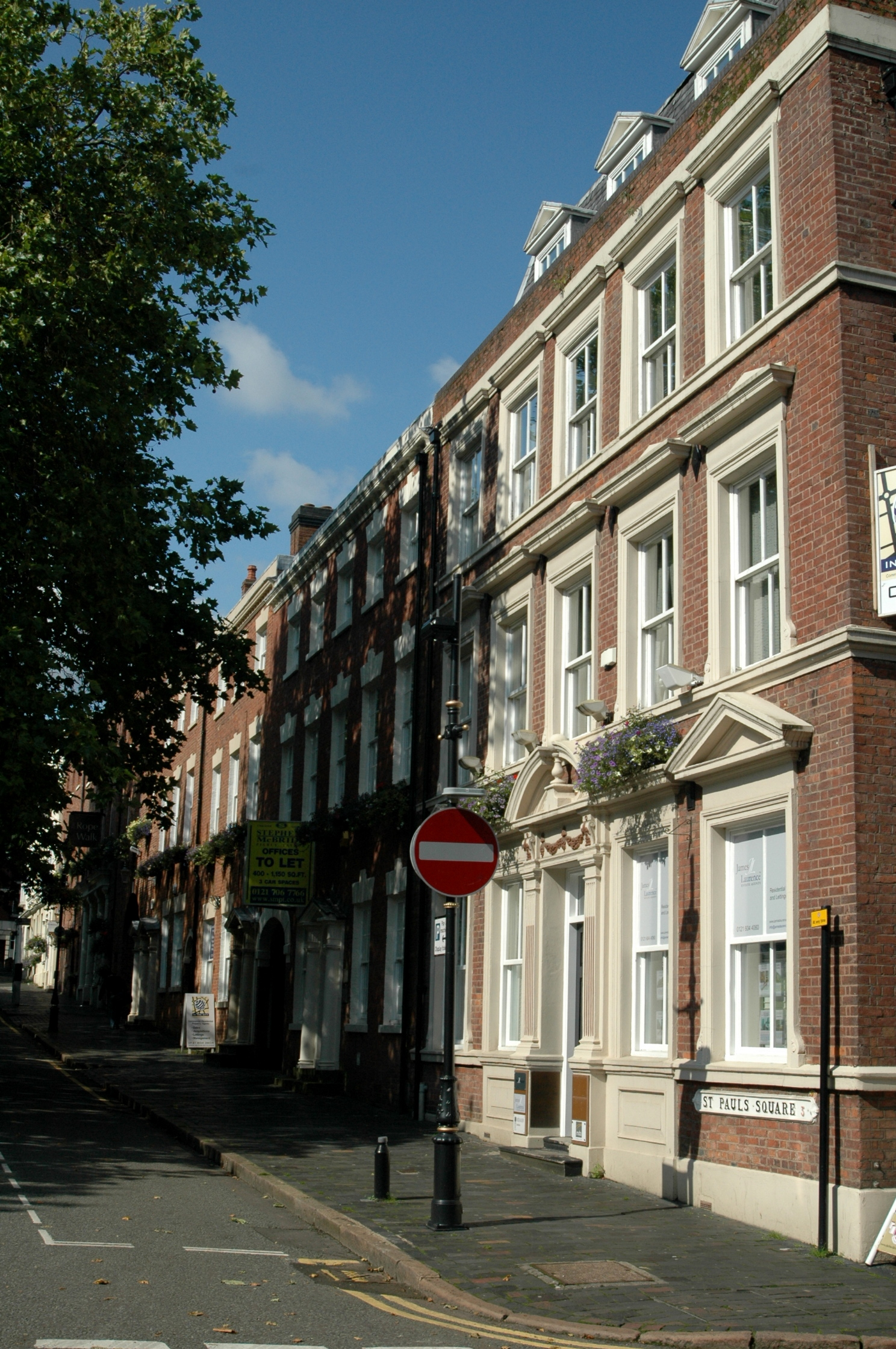
Nos 11-14 (right to left): Grade II listed

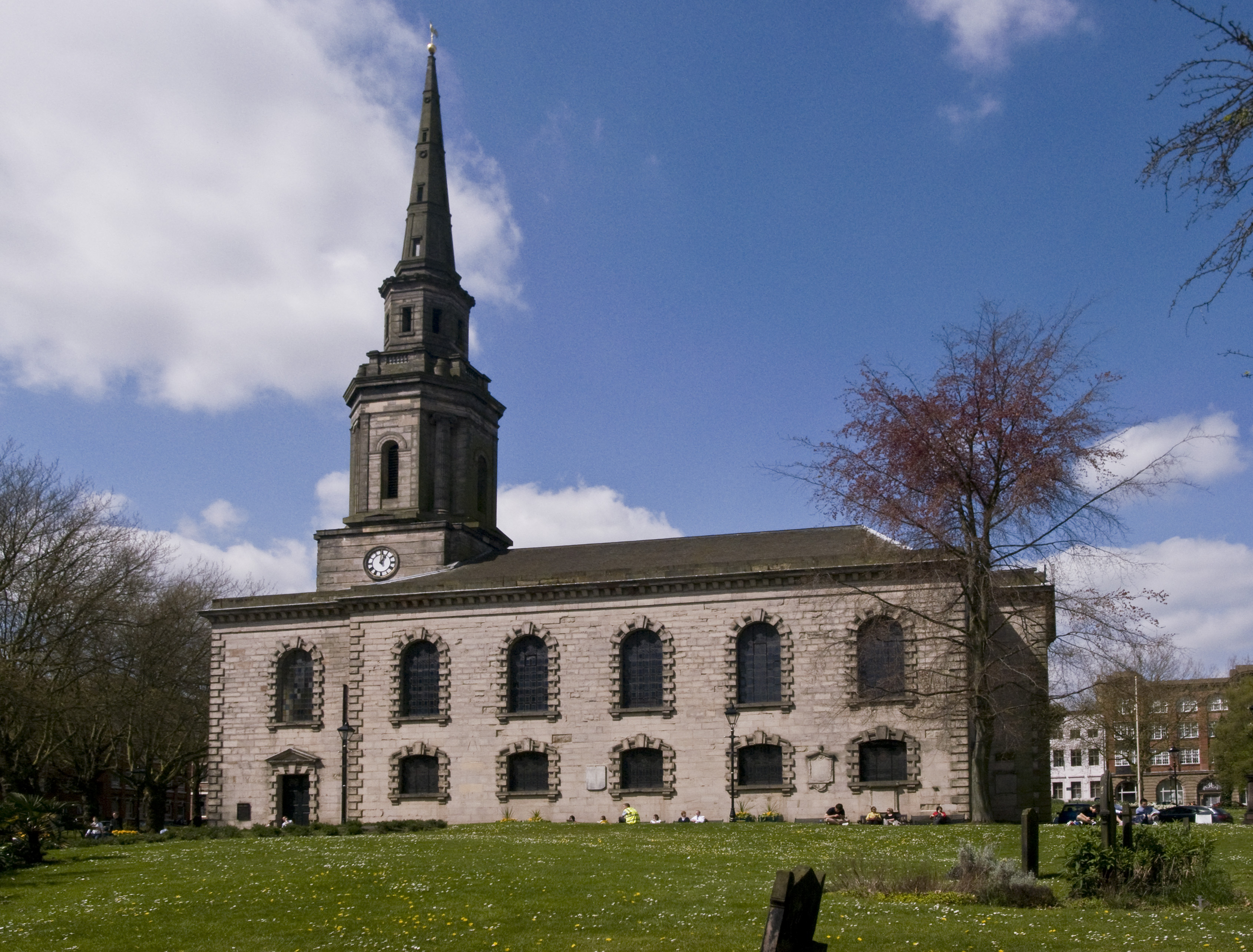
St Paul's Church: Grade I listed
