= Listed buildings in Hankelow =

Hankelow is a civil parish in Cheshire East, England. It contains six buildings that are recorded in the National Heritage List for England as designated listed buildings. Of these, two are listed at Grade II*, the middle grade, and the others are at Grade II. Apart from the village of Hankelow, the parish is entirely rural. The listed buildings consist of a former country house, now in ruins, three farmhouses, a disused bridge, and a former mill now converted into residential use.

== Key ==
Grade	Criteria
II*	Particularly important buildings of more than special interest
II	Buildings of national importance and special interest

== Buildings ==
Name and location	Photograph	Date	Notes	Grade
Ball Farmhouse; 53.00722°N 2.49553°W		16th or early 17th century	Basically a timber-framed farmhouse with rendered infill, it was largely encased in brick in the 19th century when the building was also extended. The roof is tiled. The house is in two storeys with an attic, and has a four-bay front. The right bay projects forward and is gabled. There is a two-storey gabled porch in the second bay. The windows are casements, and inside the house is an inglenook with a bressumer.	II*
Hankelow Hall; 53.30458°N 2.27561°W		Early 18th century	A country house now in ruins. It was remodelled by William Baker in about 1755, and is in early Georgian style. It is in brick with stone dressings, has three storeys, and has a symmetrical entrance front of ten bays. During restoration, evidence was found of an earlier timber-framed house.	II*
Green Farmhouse; 53.00499°N 2.49412°W	—	Early to mid-18th century	A brick farmhouse with a tiled roof. It is in two storeys with an attic and has a T-shaped plan. There is a symmetrical front of five bays, with a central 19th-century porch. The windows on the front are sashes, and on the sides are casement windows.	II
Manor Farmhouse; 53.00603°N 2.49575°W		Early 19th century	A brick farmhouse with a hipped slate roof. It is in three storeys and has a symmetrical three-bay front. In the centre is a single-storey porch. The windows are sashes with stone wedge lintels.	II
Birchall Old Bridge; 53.01036°N 2.48411°W	—	Early 19th century	This is a disused road bridge over the Birchall Brook. It is in brick with stone dressings, and consists of a single span with a round-headed arch. There are curving retaining walls on both side, ending in square piers.	II
Hankelow Mill; 53.00181°N 2.50926°W		Early 19th century	This originated as a water mill over the River Weaver, and was later converted into two houses. It is in brick with a slate roof, and is in three storeys with an attic. The building extends for six bays, and the windows are casements with cast iron frames.	II

== See also ==
- Listed buildings in Audlem
- Listed buildings in Austerson
- Listed buildings in Buerton
- Listed buildings in Hatherton
- Listed buildings in Hunsterson
- Listed buildings in Newhall
