= Roger Eykyn (architect) =

English architect (1725–1795)

- Born: 1725; Wolverhampton, England
- Died: 1795 (aged 69–70)
- Occupation: Architect
- Buildings: The body of St Paul's Church, Birmingham

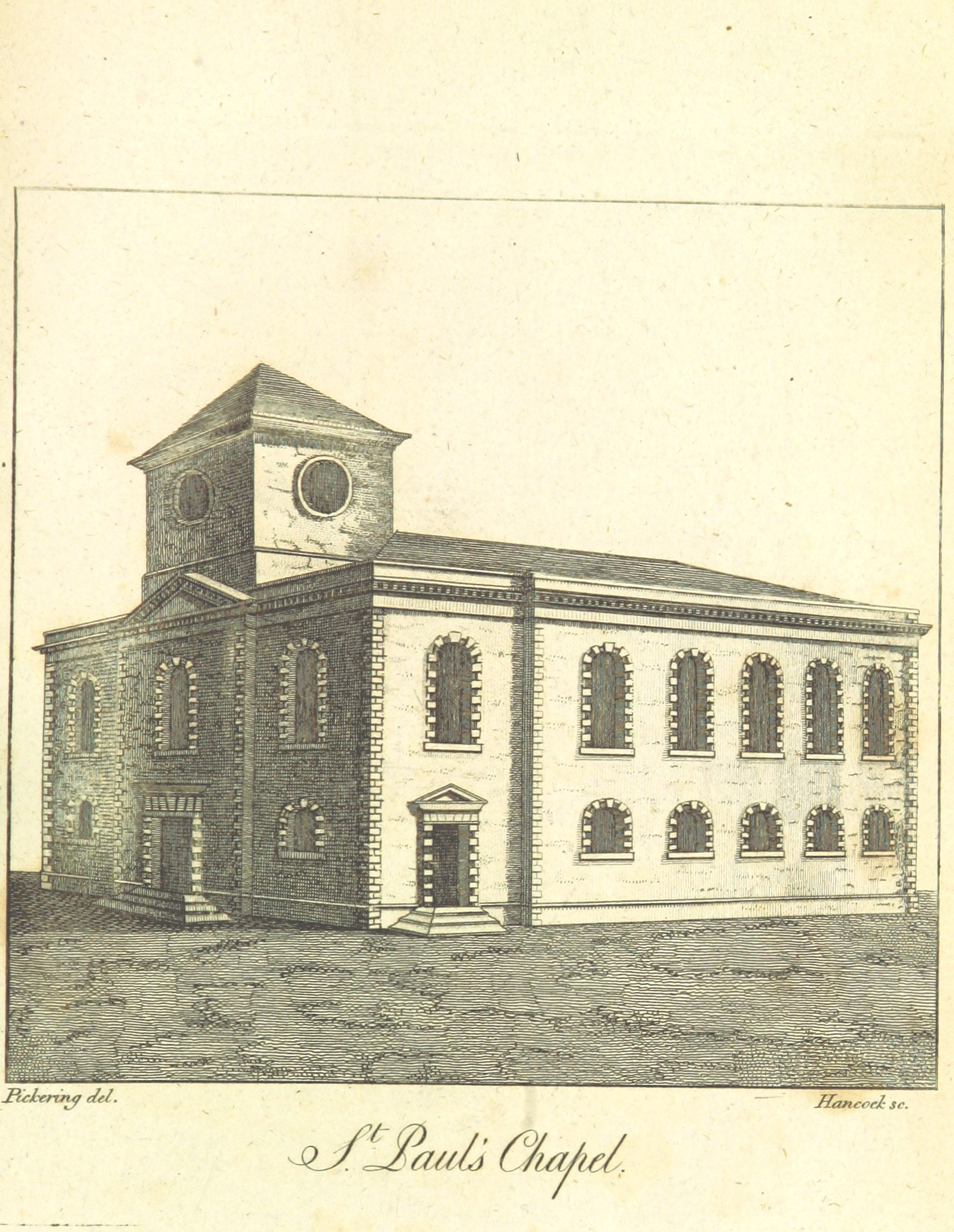
St Paul's Church, Birmingham

Roger Eykyn of Wolverhampton (1725–1795) was an English architect, building contractor and joiner. His work was primarily in a neoclassical style.

== Career ==
First appearing at Wolverhampton in 1760, he was a man of several skills, Eykyn trained as a joiner. The 'fine doorcases' at Styche Hall, Salop, for Robert Clive the 1st Baron Clive may be his work if he is the 'Me He was associated with the architect William Baker of Audlem in work at Oakly Park, Wood Eaton, Hankelow Hall, Etwall, Dorfold Hall and for Reverend Dr. Joseph Crewe. He supplied a chimneypiece for Brand and a monument to the Hayns family put up in Leighton church.

He may have been the building contractor for St John's Church, Wolverhampton, the erection of which was supervised by William Baker of Audlem, who was probably also the architect. Later on, Eykyn used it as the model for St Paul's Church, Birmingham, which was built to his designs in 1777 to 1779, based on designs in James Gibbs's Book of Architecture.

In the last year of the account book the name of James Eykyn also occurs occasionally. Among the notes of addresses is that of "Fetherstone of Ecleshall, Bricklayer". The accounts disclose that his Christian name was Gabriel, that he had a son, Gabriel junior, and that he worked under Baker
