= St Paul's Church, Birmingham =

St Paul's Church, Jewellery Quarter
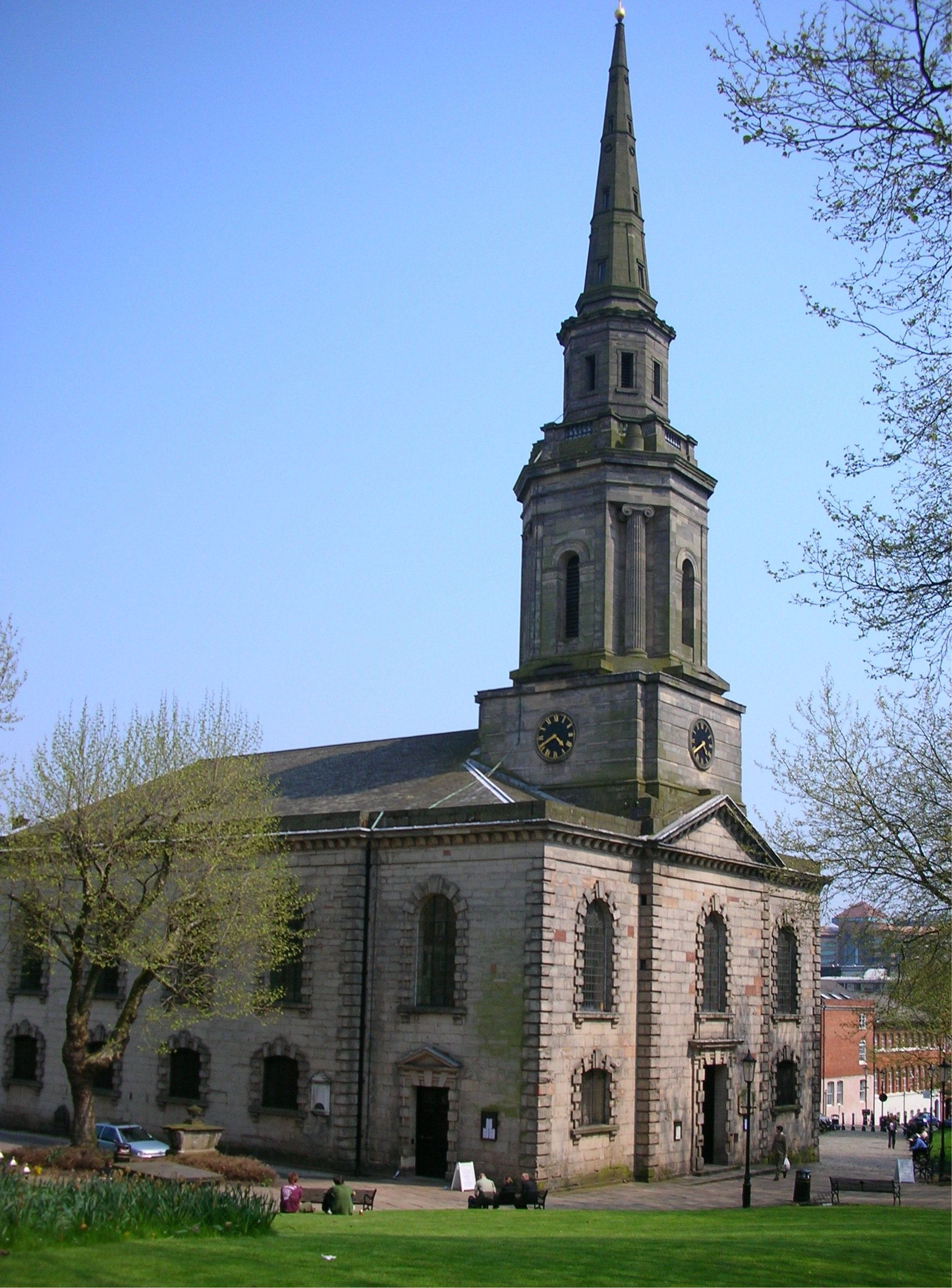
- St Paul's Church, Jewellery Quarter
- 52.4853°N 1.9058°W
- Location: St Paul's Square, Birmingham
- Country: England
- Denomination: Church of England
- Churchmanship: Inclusive Church
- Website: www.stpaulsjq.church

History
- Consecrated: 1779

Architecture
- Heritage designation: Grade I listed

St Paul's is a Church of England church in the Georgian St Paul's Square in the Jewellery Quarter, Birmingham, England.

== History ==
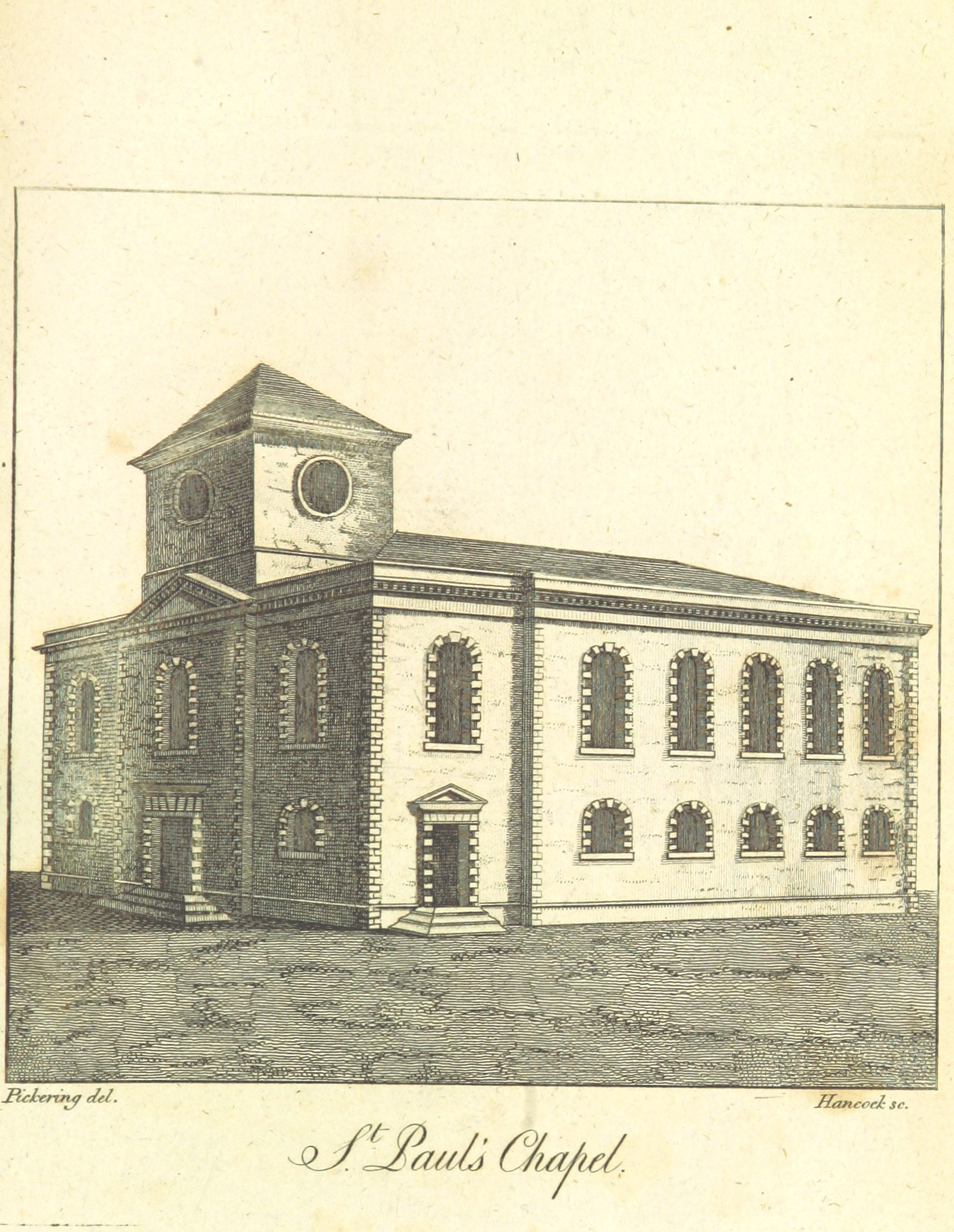
Drawing from William Hutton's 1809 book An history of Birmingham, showing the church before the spire was added

The Grade I listed church was designed by Roger Eykyn of Wolverhampton. Building started in 1777, and the church was consecrated in 1779. It was built on land given by Charles Colmore from his Newhall estate. It was the church of Birmingham's early manufacturers and merchants – Matthew Boulton and James Watt had their own pews, which were bought and sold as commodities at that time.

It is a rectangular church. The upper part of the tower and spire were added between 1822 and 1823, designed by Francis Goodwin and built by Standbridge and Company.

In 1841 the church became a parish in its own right, with land taken from that of St Martin in the Bull Ring. In 1947, St Mark's Church, King Edward's Road was demolished, and the parish was joined with that of St Paul's.

Bomb damage from the Second World War was repaired between 1949 and 1951 when much of the roof was replaced. The church undertook another restoration between 1985 and 1994. A peal of 10 bells was installed in 2005.

== Stained glass ==
The east window has an important enamelled stained-glass window made in 1791 by Francis Eginton and modelled an altarpiece painted c. 1786 by Benjamin West, now in the Dallas Museum of Art. It shows the Conversion of Paul. The cost of the window was 400 guineas (£420; equivalent to £54,750 in 2025); a fundraising shortfall of over 200 guineas was reported, which "two Grand Miscellaneous Concerts" at the city's Theatre Royal failed to recoup.

In the south-east nave there is a window by Ward and Hughes of c. 1880. The remaining windows are by Pearce between 1900 and 1907, and a modern window by Rachel Thomas in the north aisle dating from 2000.

== Organ ==
"An organ, made by one of the most eminent builders" was inaugurated in Easter week, 1791.

The next documented organ in St Paul's was built in 1830 by James Bishop. It was sited on the gallery at the west end of the church. Banfield enlarged the organ in 1838 including a new Swell division which was probably a replacement for Bishop's Swell rather than an addition. Bevington and Sons rebuilt and enlarged the organ in 1871 and again worked on it in 1897.

The organ was moved to its present location in 1927 by Conacher Sheffield & Co. and was extensively rebuilt. However, the organ case could not be accommodated in its new position unaltered. The wings had to be removed and are now joined to serve as the screen facing the north gallery, along with some recycled pew doors. The side towers could not fit between the mouldings on the north arcade bases, so the entire case-front was raised so that the corbels of the side towers cleared the mouldings. This caused the side-tower cornices to conflict with the arcade capitals, so the cornices were removed.

Following war damage and the resulting weather-related damage, the organ was noted to be in a poor state by 1953, notably the Choir division was completely 'bombed out'. Hill, Norman & Beard remodelled the organ as a two manual and pedal instrument in 1964. This is the organ present today albeit with some additions to the piston system added in 1996. There are a mixture of mechanical and electro-pneumatic actions and soundboards of differing compasses. The pipework consists of some of the original Bishop ranks, some second hand pipework from Hill Norman & Beard's stock in 1964 and one partly new stop – the Great Stopped Diapason.

=== List of organists ===
- James Kempson c. 1780
- Jeremiah Clark c. 1800
- William Ward 1820– ????
- Thomas Munden ???? – 1838
- George Hollins 1838 – 1841
- James Stimpson 1842 – ????
- Mr. Evans c. 1852
- Frederick Barnby 1857–1859 (afterwards organist of Montreal Cathedral)
- John Pearce ???? – 1870 (afterwards organist of St. Thomas' Church, Birmingham)
- Frederick Harrod 1870 – ????
- Bernard Farebrother 1873 – 1884 (afterwards organist of Holy Trinity Church, Birchfield)
- Edward Percival Oxley 1908 – 1956 (formerly deputy organist at Wells Cathedral)
- George John Halford
- Cyril Raymond Mapstone 1961 – 1986
- Howard Chapman 1986 – 1988
- Andrew Hudson 1988 – 1991
- Andrew Burling 1991 – 1992
- John Pryer 1992 – 1995
- Dr. Stephen Lansberry 1995
- Gareth Perkins 1995 – 1997
- David Griffiths 1997 – 2001
- Kevin Gill 2001 – 2003
- Paul Carr 2003 – 2016
- Anne Michael 2017 – 2018 (RBC Student)
- Joshua Hughes 2018 – 2020 (RBC Student)
- Dylan McCaig 2021 – 2023
- Darren Hogg 2023–present

== Clock ==
A new clock was installed in 1875, constructed by Leeson and Sons of Coleshill. The iron frame was 6 feet 4 inches (1.93 m) long and 2 feet 8 inches (0.81 m) wide. The main wheel for striking the hours was 18 inches (46 cm) in diameter and the hammer which struck the hour bell was 51 lbs. The clock was fitted with Denison’s double tree-legged gravity escapement. The pendulum with a zinc and iron tubular compensation weighed 3 cwt and was 15 feet (4.6 m) long. The time was shown on 3 illuminated dials 5 feet 6 inches (1.68 m) in diameter.

== Bells ==
The first ring of bells was added in 2005. Prior to this the church had three bells used as a service bell and clock chimes. A new ring of ten bells was installed to celebrate the 250th anniversary of the St.Martin's Guild of Church Bell Ringers and officially opened on 25 November 2005. The tenor weighs 12 long cwt 2 qr 13 lb (1,413 lb or 641 kg).

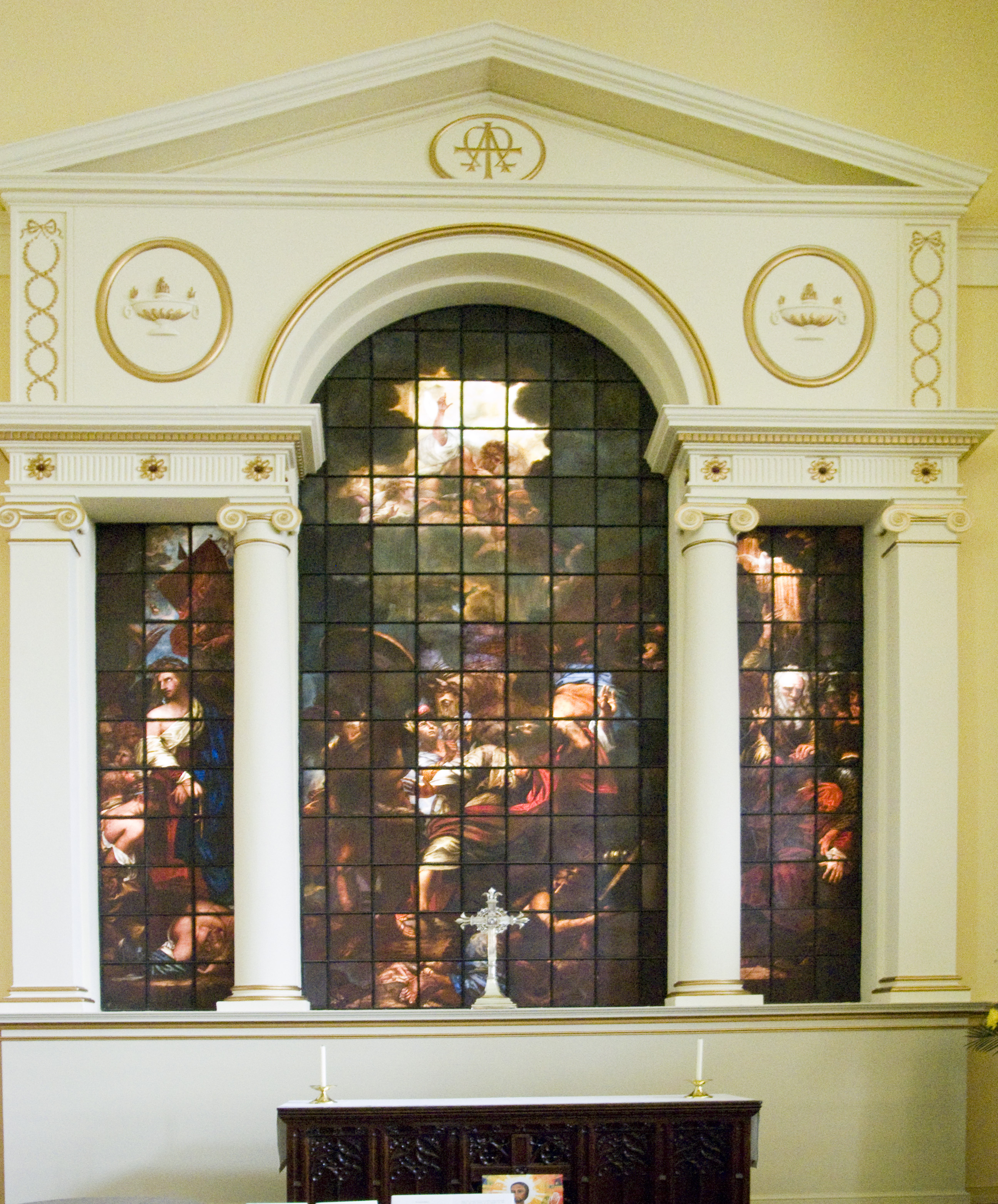
The east window — The Conversion of Saint Paul

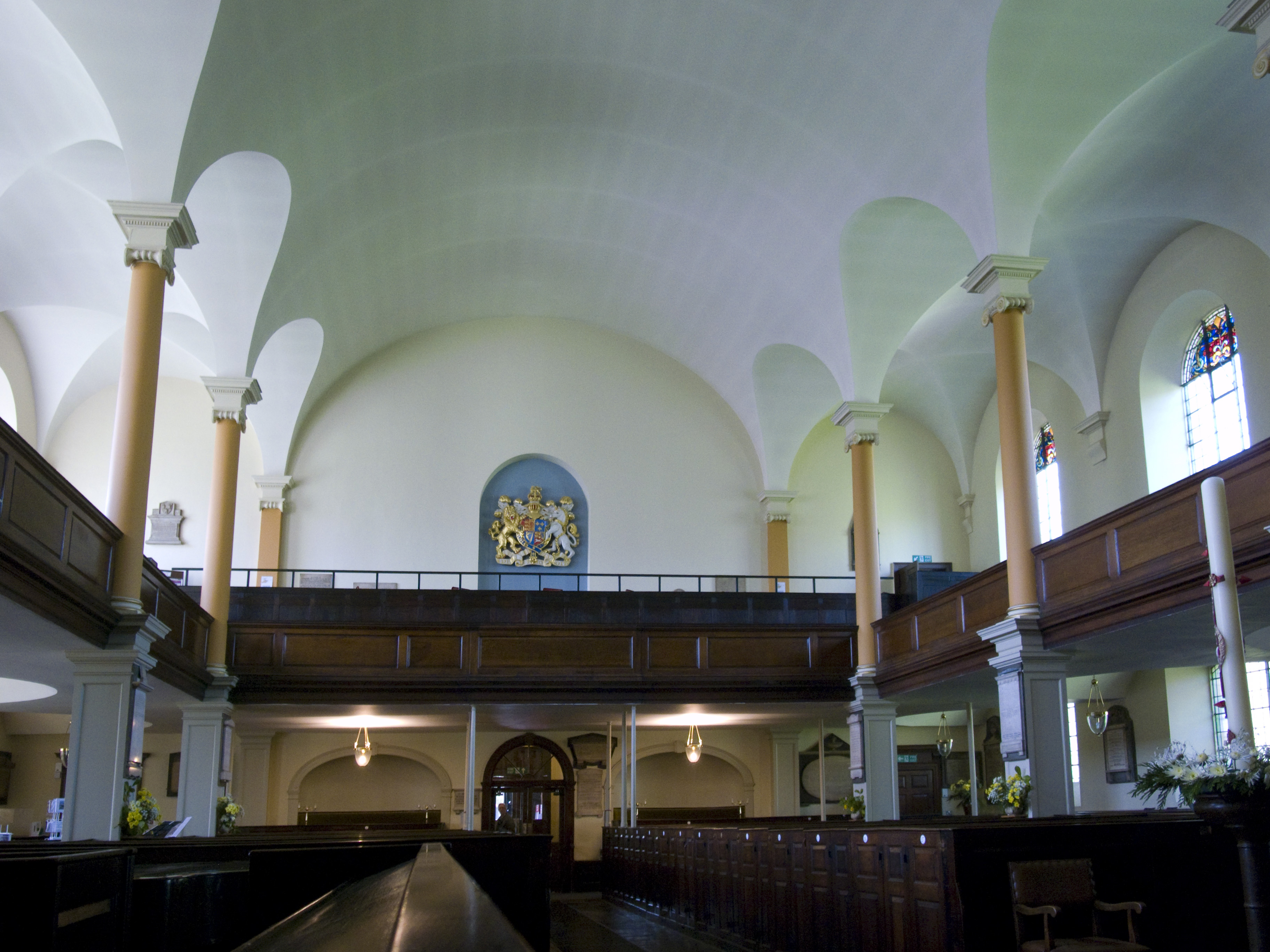
inside view showing balcony and ceiling

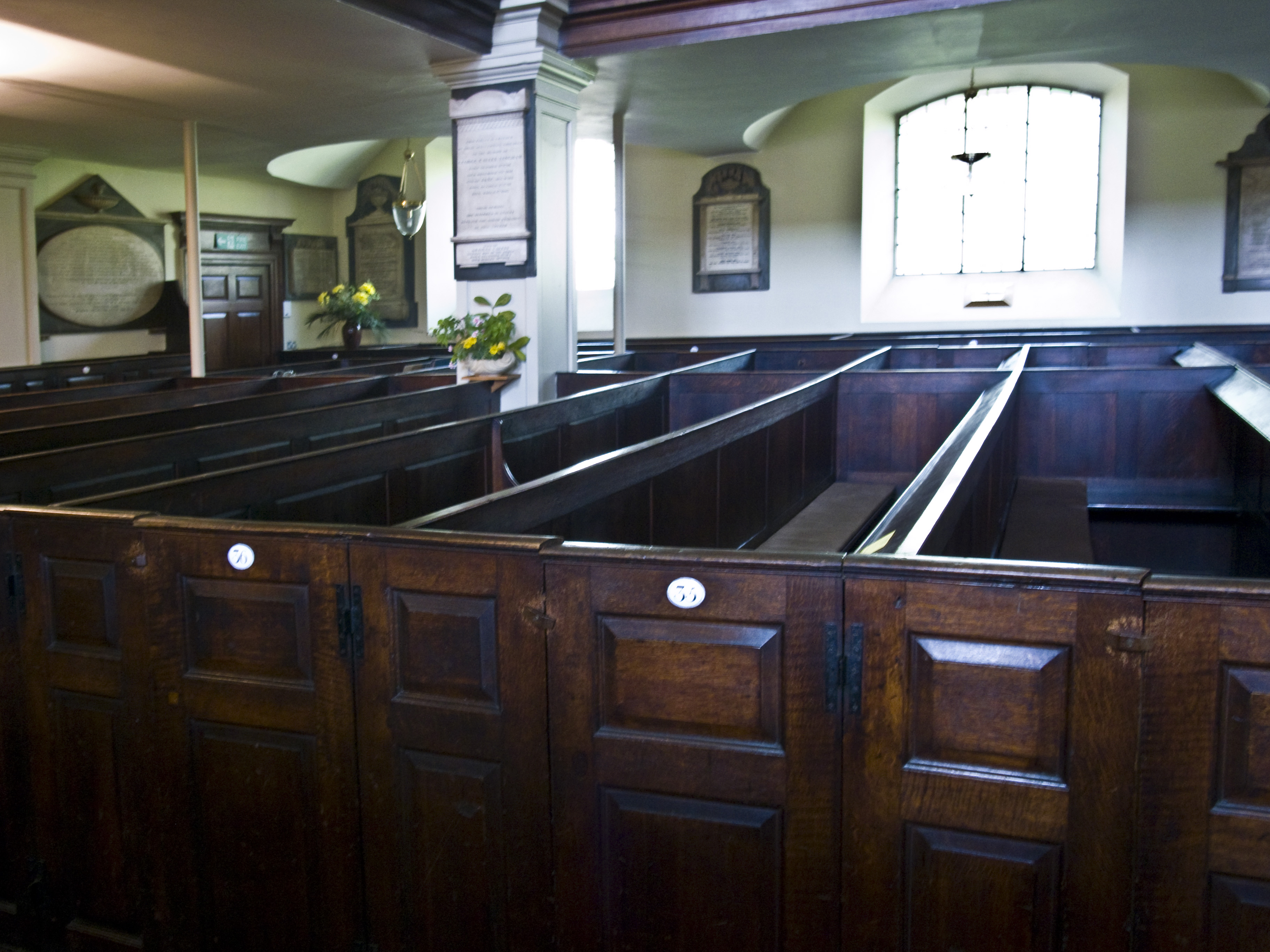
The church pews

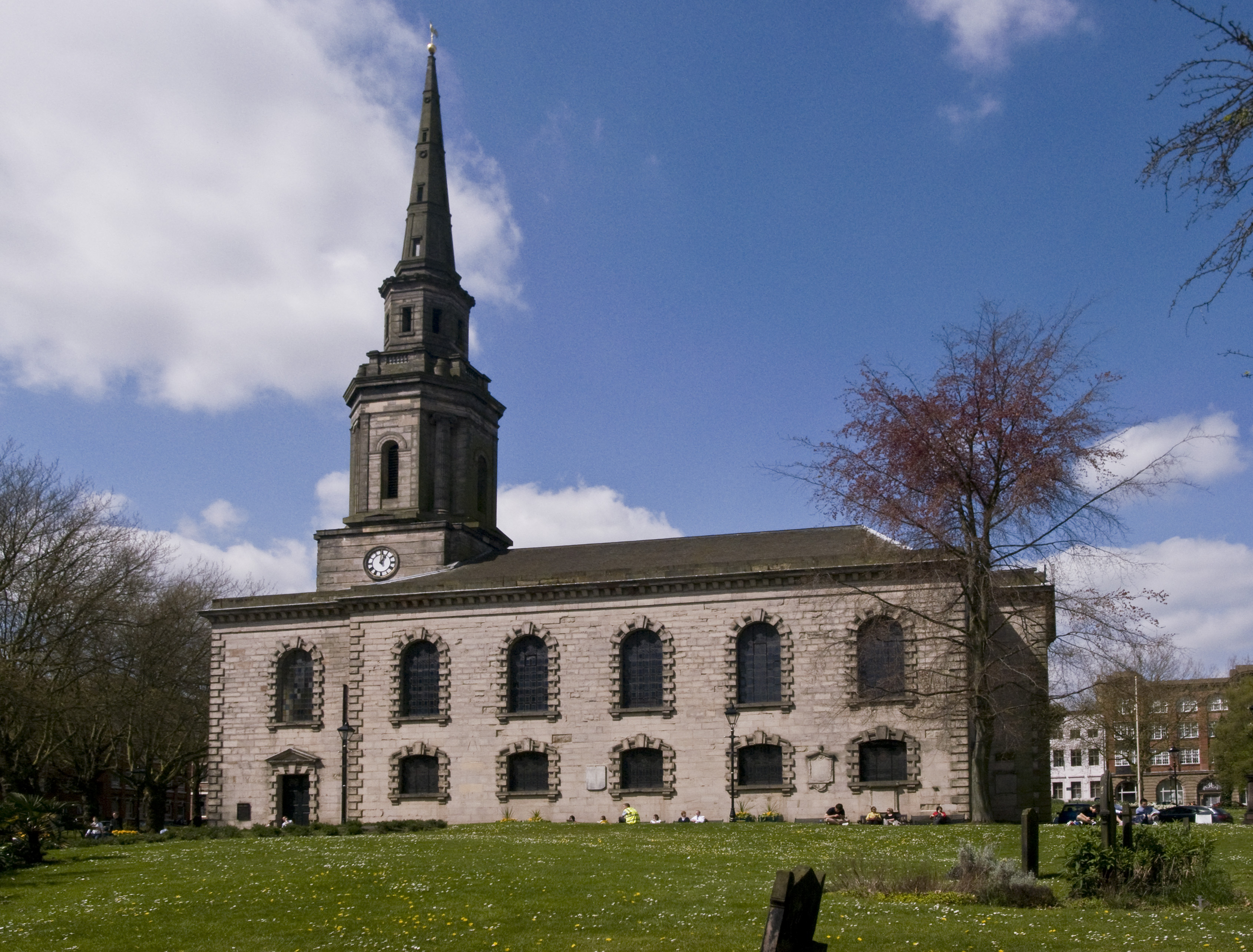
Church from the south showing St Paul's Square

== Notable burials ==
- William Hollins (1763–1843), architect and sculptor (monument in church)

== See also ==
- List of works by Francis Goodwin
