= George Hollins =

British organist and composer

George Hollins (16 March 1809 - 16 December 1841) was an organist and composer who lived in Birmingham, West Midlands.

== Life ==
He was born on 16 March 1809, the son of William Hollins (1763-1843) architect and sculptor, and Catherine Holebrooke (1764-1831).

Despite being lame, he studied organ under Thomas Munder, the organist of Birmingham Town Hall. In 1837 he was appointed organist of Birmingham Town Hall where he participated in two of the Birmingham Triennial Music Festivals alongside visiting composer Felix Mendelssohn.

He married Mary Theresa Burchell (1820-1871), daughter of James Burchell of London, on 13 April 1837 in Tamworth. They had the following children:

- Mary Hollins (b. 1837)
- Julia Elizabeth Hollins (b. 1840)
- Caroline Hollins (b. 1842)

He died on 16 December 1841 aged just 33.

== Career ==
- Organist of Birmingham Town Hall 1837 - 1841
- Organist of St Paul's Church, Birmingham 1838 - 1841

== Compositions ==
- The Sabbath Bell, a sacred ballad 1841
