= Francis Eginton =

English painter

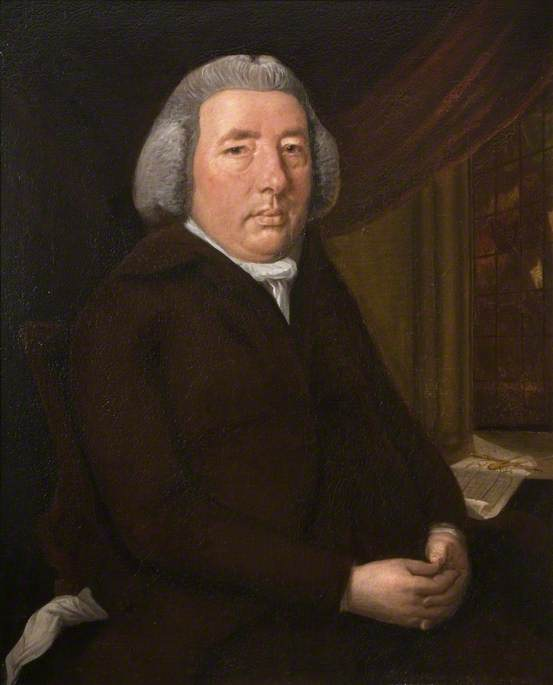
- Born: 1737
- Died: 1805

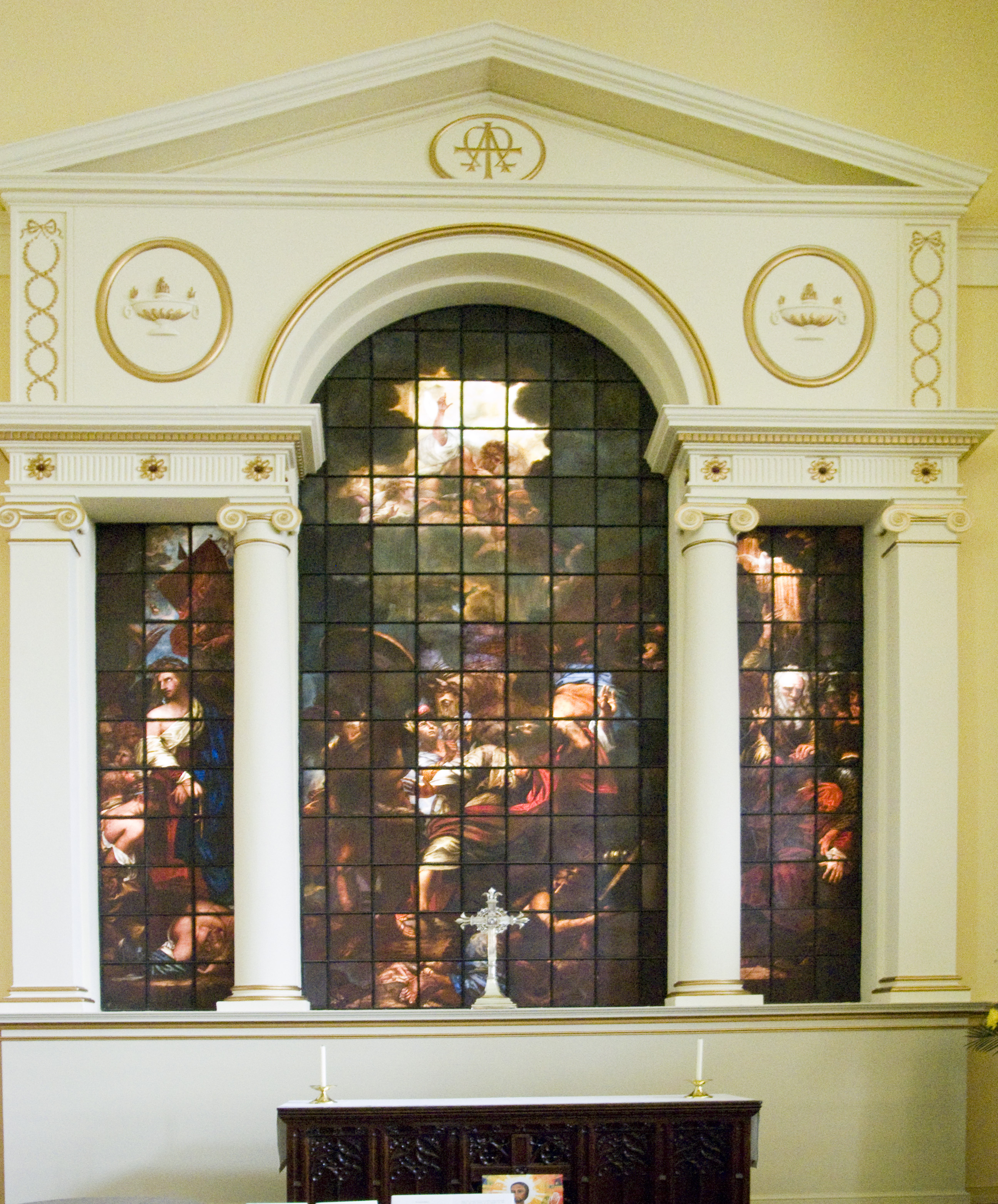
East window of St Paul's Church, Birmingham, Birmingham (1791).

Francis Eginton (1737–1805), sometimes spelled Egginton, was an English glass painter. He painted windows for cathedrals, churches, chapels and stately homes, etc., around the country, leaving 50 large works altogether; his work was also exported abroad. His masterpiece is The Conversion of St. Paul, for the east window of St Paul's Church, Birmingham. He also developed a method for reproducing paintings mechanically.

== Early life and career ==
Eginton was the grandson of the rector of Eckington, Worcestershire, and was trained as an enameller at Bilston. As a young man he was employed by Matthew Boulton at the Soho Manufactory. In 1764 Eginton was employed as a decorator of japanned wares, but also did much work in modelling. During the next few years Boulton brought together a number of able artists at Soho, including John Flaxman and James Wyatt; and Eginton rapidly became a skilful worker in almost every department of decorative art.

== "Mechanical paintings" or "polygraphs" ==
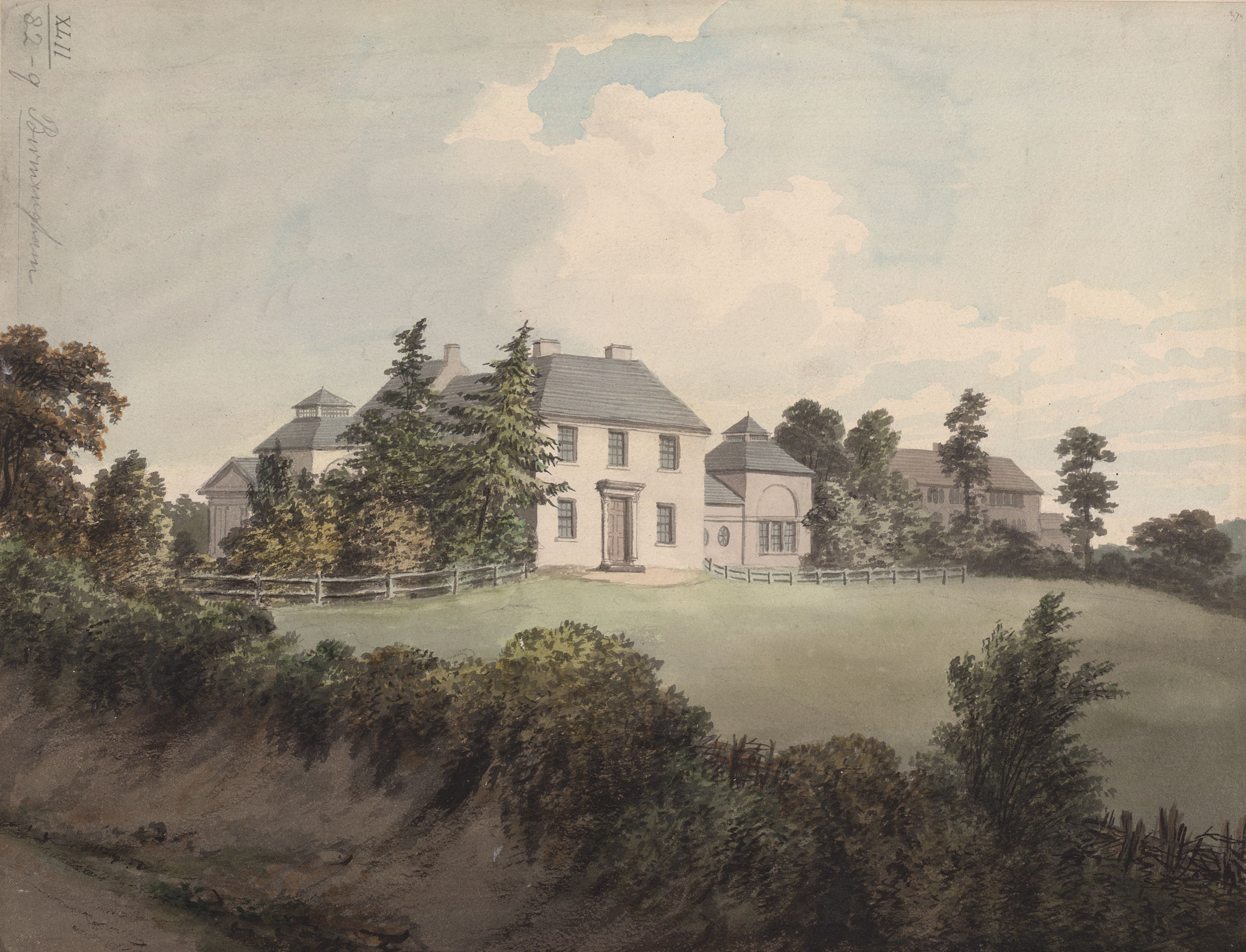
View of Mr Egginton's House near Soho Birmingham (1775, artist unknown)

Eginton was a partner with Boulton in the production of "mechanical paintings" or "polygraphs" The idea for these was in all probability taken by Boulton from a process modified by Robert Laurie (1755?-1836) from Jean-Baptiste Le Prince's 'aquatint' engravings. Eginton perfected the method and applied it to the production of coloured copies of paintings. More plates than one were required for each picture, and after leaving the printing-press Eginton finished them by hand. They were copied from the works of Philip James de Loutherbourg, Angelica Kauffman and other artists, and varied in price from £1. 10s. to £21. The largest were 40 inches by 50. They were sometimes mistaken for original paintings, although these old "polygraphs" were in fact nearly identical to the varnished coloured oleographs which later became prevalent, the main difference being that the latter were printed lithographically.

F. P. Smith, then of the Patent Museum in South Kensington, maintained, in a paper read before the Photographic Society of London in 1863, that some of these polygraphs preserved at the museum were actually early photographs . This claim, however was untenable. Pioneering photographer, Thomas Wedgwood, had indeed made experiments upon copying pictures by the action of light upon silver nitrate, but the results then obtained would not have been capable of producing pictures of their size and character. The matter was finally settled by a series of pamphlets written by Boulton's grandson, M. P. W. Boulton, in 1863-5, in which he gave an account of the whole matter. Furthermore, the leading lithographer Vincent Brooks was able to produce an exact imitation of the "ground" of one of the examples exhibited at South Kensington by taking an impression from an aquatint engraved plate on paper used for transfer lithography.

== Glass painting ==
The "picture branch" of Boulton's business was discontinued as unprofitable, the loss on this and the japanning trade being over £500 for 1780. The partnership between Eginton and Boulton was dissolved. Lord Dartmouth proposed to grant Eginton a government pension of £20 a year for his work on the picture copying process, but Boulton raised objections and the offer was withdrawn. For the next year or two Eginton appears to have continued to work at Soho, and to have begun in 1781 to stain and paint upon glass. In 1784 he left Soho and set up in business for himself at Prospect Hill House (demolished in 1871), which stood just opposite Soho.

Before Eginton the art of glass-painting had fallen into complete disuse. He revived it and turned out a long series of works in stained glass from his Birmingham factory. His first work of consequence was the arms of the knights of the Garter for two Gothic windows in the stalls in St. George's Chapel, Windsor, and his other works include:

- Salisbury Cathedral (east and west windows, and ten mosaic windows) and Lichfield Cathedral (east window), after Joshua Reynolds
- The east window of Wanstead Church, Essex
- A large representation of the "Good Samaritan" in the private chapel of the Archbishop of Armagh
- A window in the chapel of the Bishop of Derry's palace
- Memorial and other windows in Babworth Church, Nottingham
- Aston Church, Birmingham
- Shuckburgh Church, Warwickshire
- Tewkesbury Abbey Church
- Lunette above the altar, Catholic chapel, New Wardour Castle, Wiltshire
- The windows of Merton College chapel, Oxford
- The ante-chapel of Magdalen College
- The east window at St Paul's Church, Birmingham, where Boulton had a pew.
- The east window at St Alkmund's Church, Shrewsbury.

Eginton painted a window (20 ft. by 10 ft.) representing Solomon and the Queen of Sheba, in the banqueting room of Arundel Castle, and did a large amount of work for William Beckford at Fonthill Abbey, including thirty-two figures of kings, knights, etc., and many windows, for which he was paid £12,000. Much of his work was for export, and some of his best work ended up in Amsterdam. In 1791 he completed what was then considered his masterpiece, the "Conversion of St. Paul", for the east window of St Paul's Church, Birmingham, for which he received the "very inadequate sum of four hundred guineas".

Eginton's works were, in fact, transparencies on glass. He was obliged to render opaque a large portion of his glass, and thus covered up the characteristic beauty of the old windows. Eginton's showroom was visited by all distinguished visitors to Birmingham. Lord Nelson, accompanied by Sir William and Lady Hamilton called there on 29 August 1802.

== Personal life ==
His daughter married Henry Wyatt, the painter; his son, William Raphael Eginton, succeeded to his father's business, and in 1816 was appointed glass-stainer to Princess Charlotte. His brother, John Eginton, was a noted stipple engraver. His nephew, also called Francis Eginton, was also a notable engraver.

Eginton died on 26 March 1805, and was buried in the churchyard of St Mary’s Church, Handsworth.
