= Newhall, Cheshire =

Village in Cheshire, England

Coordinates: 53.007°N 2.585°W

Newhall
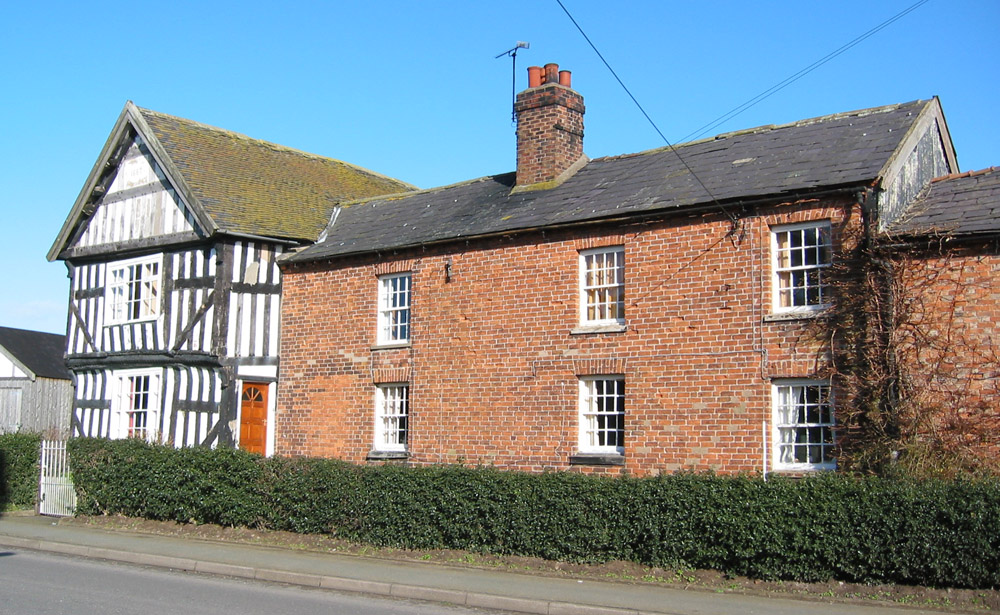
- Aston House Farm, Aston

- Location within Cheshire
- Population: 776 (2011)
- OS grid reference: SJ609454
- Civil parish: Newhall
- Unitary authority: Cheshire East
- Ceremonial county: Cheshire
- Region: North West
- Country: England
- Sovereign state: United Kingdom
- Post town: NANTWICH
- Postcode district: CW5
- Dialling code: 01260
- Police: Cheshire
- Fire: Cheshire
- Ambulance: North West
- UK Parliament: Chester South and Eddisbury

Newhall is a village (at SJ609454) and civil parish in the unitary authority of Cheshire East and the ceremonial county of Cheshire, England. The village lies 3½ miles to the west of Audlem and 5 miles to the south west of Nantwich. The parish also includes the village of Aston (at SJ610468), and the small settlements of Aston Heath, Barnett Brook, Brown's Bank, Dodd's Green, Grandford, Grindley Green, Hollingreen, Kingswood Green, Maiden Estate, Salesbrook, Sheppenhall and part of Sandford. Nearby villages include Audlem and Wrenbury.

According to the 2001 census, the parish had a population of 669, increasing to 776 at the 2011 Census.

== Governance ==
Newhall is administered by Newhall Parish Council. From 1974 the civil parish was served by Crewe and Nantwich Borough Council, which was succeeded on 1 April 2009 by the unitary authority of Cheshire East. Newhall falls in the parliamentary constituency of Chester South and Eddisbury, which has been represented since the 2024 general election by Aphra Brandreth of the Conservative Party. It was previously part of the Eddisbury constituency, which since its establishment in 1983 had been held by the Conservative MPs Alastair Goodlad (1983–99), Stephen O'Brien (1999–2015), Antoinette Sandbach (2015–19) and Edward Timpson (2019–24).

== Geography and transport ==
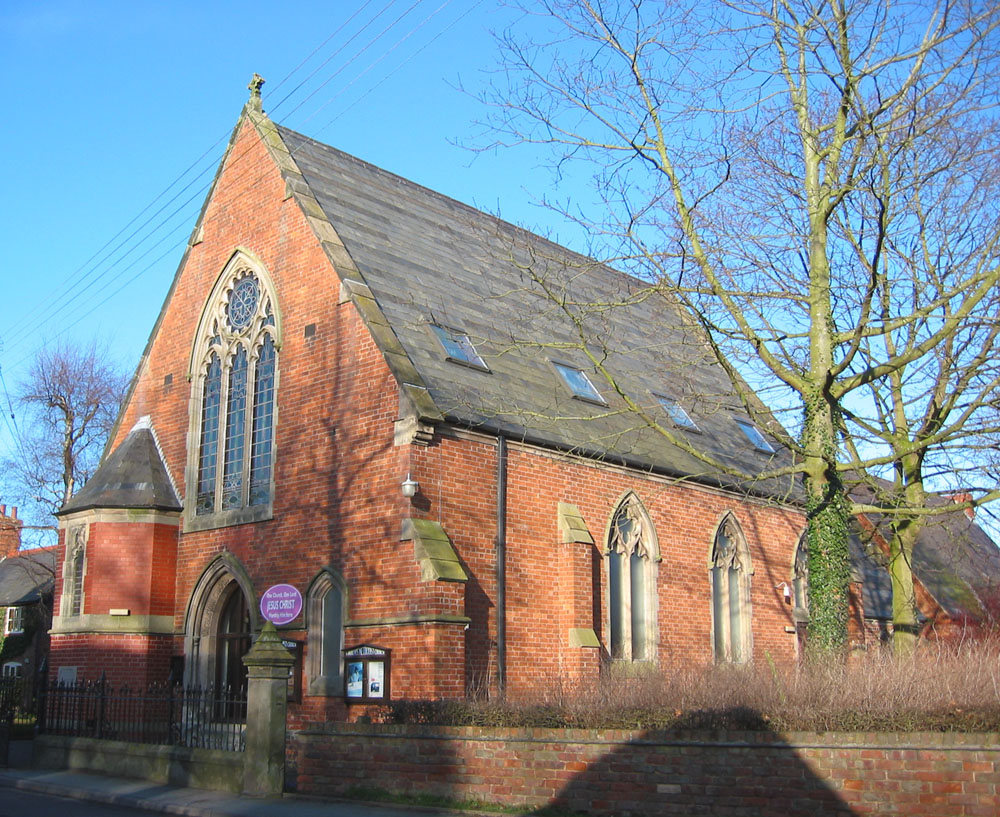
St Andrew's Methodist Church, Aston

The A530 and A525 roads run north–south and east–west, respectively, through the parish.

== Landmarks ==
The industrial enterprises of Aston Mill and New Primebake are located in the parish. St Andrew's Methodist Chapel is in the village of Aston and has a small cemetery; there is a former Methodist church in Dodd's Green. The Bhurtpore Inn, an award-winning public house listed in The Good Pub Guide, is found in Aston.

Aston House Farm is a black-and-white timber-framed farmhouse in Aston that dates from 1662; it is listed at grade II.

== See also ==
- Listed buildings in Newhall, Cheshire
