= Francis Eginton (engraver) =

English engraver

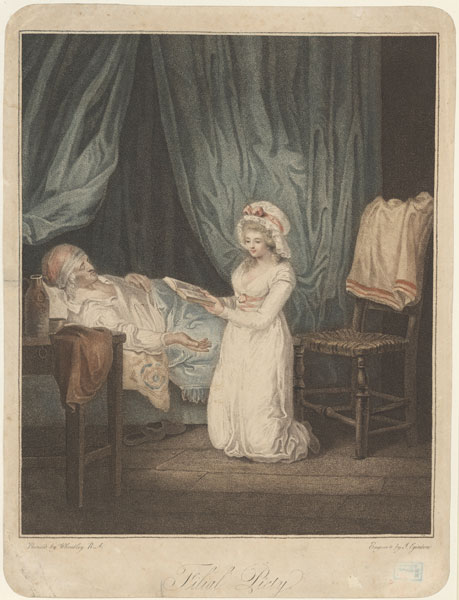
Filial piety (1796)

Francis Eginton (Birmingham 1775 – 1823 near Newport, Shropshire) was an English engraver.

== Life ==
Eginton was the son of John Eginton, a noted stipple engraver and a nephew of Francis Eginton. He was born in Birmingham in 1775, and died in 1823 at Meertown House, near Newport, Shropshire, aged 48.

Eginton's work as an engraver was distinguished by accuracy and taste. He illustrated Stebbing Shaw's History of Staffordshire, John Price's histories of Leominster (1795) and Hereford (1796), Robert Bell Wheler's History and Antiquities of Stratford-on-Avon, James Bisset's Picturesque Birmingham Guide, Pratt's Leamington Guide, Thomas Howell's Stranger in Shrewsbury, and most of the topographical and historical works published in the Midlands during his time. A large plate of Pontcysyllte Aqueduct was one of his most notable works. As a person, Eginton was described as a 'cheerful and gentlemanly companion, and much respected.'
