= Hankelow Hall =

Country house in Cheshire, England

Coordinates: 53.01267°N 2.49510°W

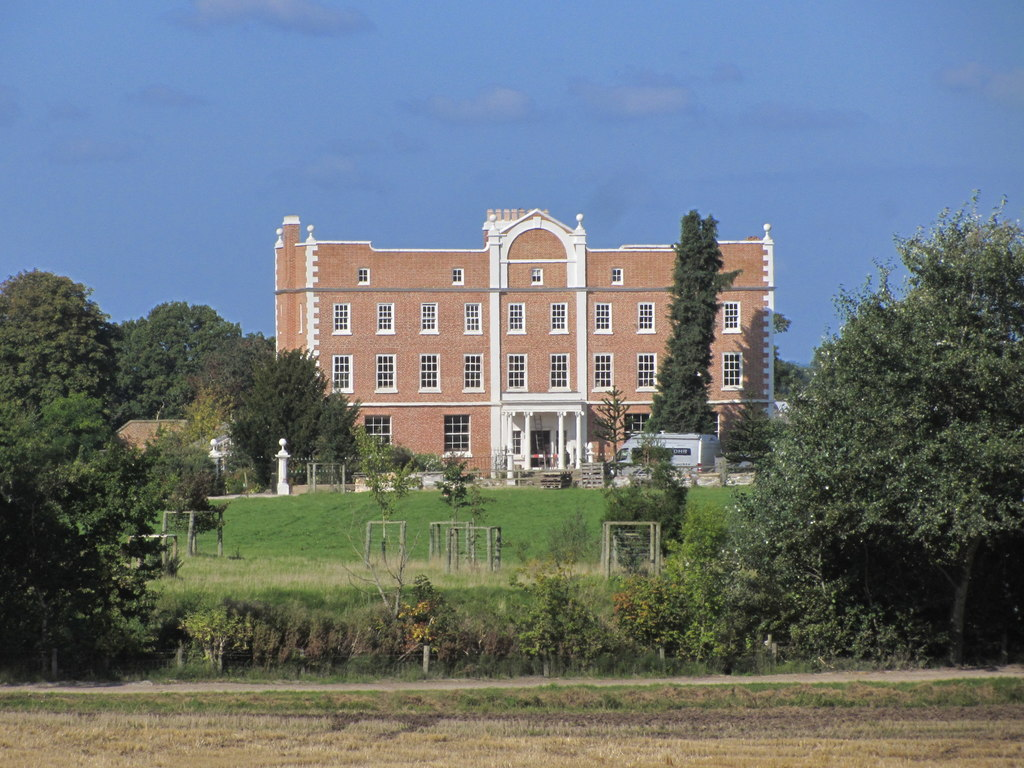
Hankelow Hall

Hankelow Hall is a former country house to the north of the village of Hankelow, Cheshire, England.

== History ==
The present house dates from the early 18th century, and was remodelled by William Baker in about 1755. It was built for Gabriel Wettenhall, and altered for his son, Nathaniel. At the end of the 19th century, it was owned by the Haworth family. During the 20th century the house was uninhabited and it became neglected. In 1989 it was bought by a property developer who has been restoring it. In this process, evidence was found of an earlier house, including wattle and daub, remains of a timber-framed building, and window frames that have been dated to the 17th century.

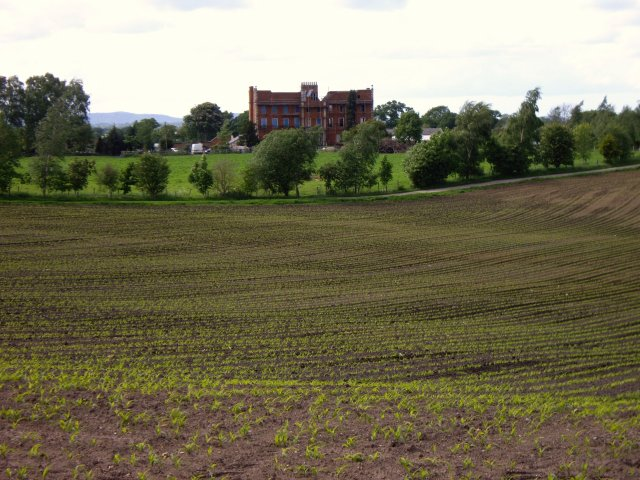
View towards the hall

== Architecture ==
The house is constructed in red brick with ashlar dressings. The architectural style is Early Georgian. It is in three storeys, and its symmetrical entrance front has ten bays. Along the top of the front is a parapet that is "strikingly high". The central two bays are flanked by pilasters that rise to a blank arch even higher than the parapet. At the tops of the pilasters, and at the corners of the house, are ball finials. All the windows on the entrance front are sash windows. Between the bottom and middle storey is a stone band. Between the middle and top storey, and between the top storey and parapet, are string courses. At the corners of the building are ashlar quoins. The porch is supported by four unfluted Ionic columns. On the left side of the house is a canted bay window incorporating French windows that are approached by steps. The house is recorded in the National Heritage List for England as a designated Grade II* listed building.

== See also ==
- Grade II* listed buildings in Cheshire East
- Listed buildings in Hankelow
