= Aston by Wrenbury =

Village in Cheshire, England

Coordinates: 53°01′N 2°34′W

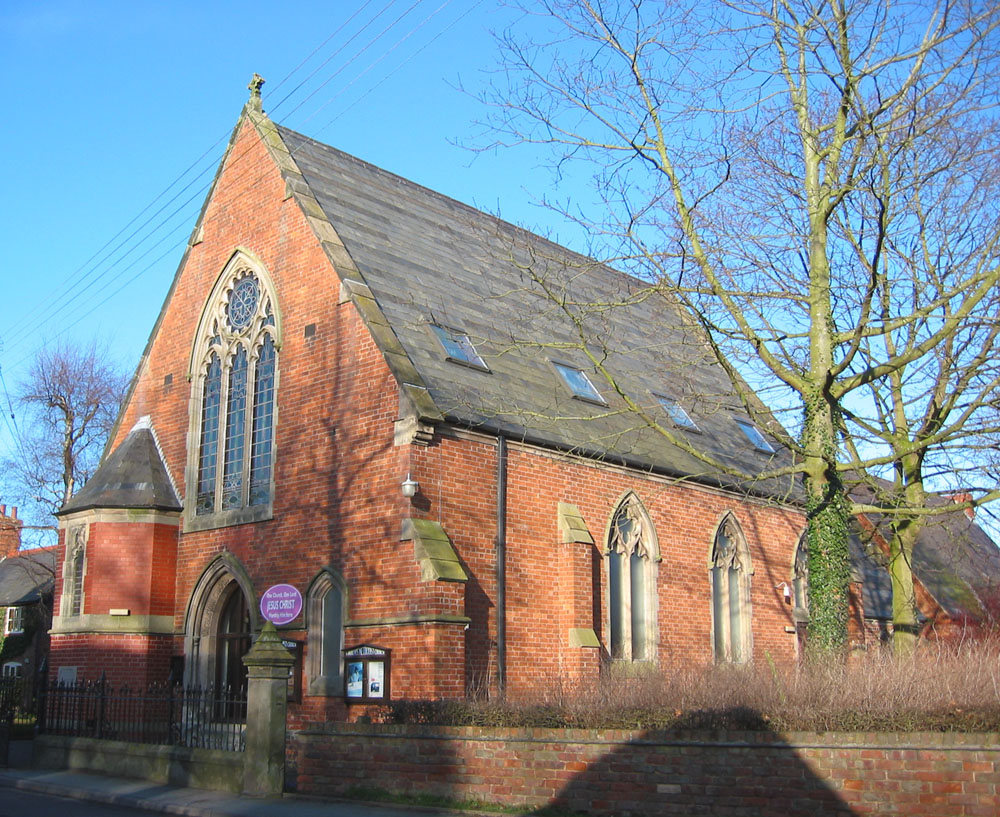
St Andrew's Methodist Church

Aston (also known as Aston by Wrenbury, Aston in Wrenbury, Aston by Newhall, Aston in Newhall and Aston near Audlem) is a village in the civil parish of Newhall in the unitary authority of Cheshire East and the ceremonial county of Cheshire, England.

The village should not be confused with several other villages named Aston in Cheshire, which include Aston juxta Mondrum, Aston by Budworth and Aston, Vale Royal.

== History ==
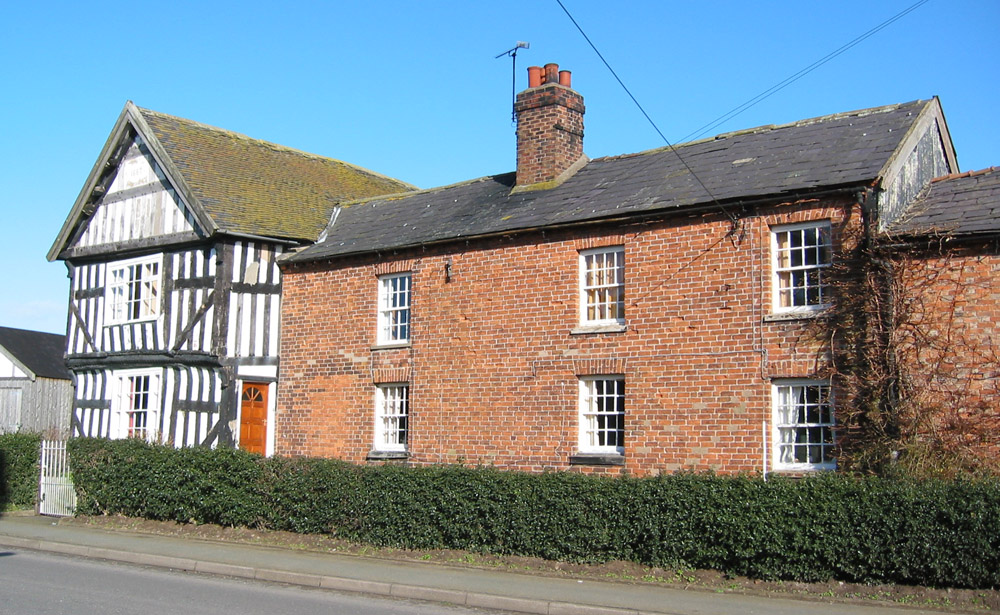
Aston House Farm

The village features in the Domesday Book as Estune, meaning eastern manor, settlement or farmstead.

== Geography and transport ==
Aston lies between the larger villages of Wrenbury (1¼ miles north west) and Audlem (3¾ miles south east), with Nantwich being 4¼ miles to the north east. The main part of the village is located on Wrenbury Road north west of the A530; the southern part lies along Sheppenhall Lane south of the A530. The Cheshire Cycleway and South Cheshire Way long-distance path run through the village, and the Welsh Marches railway line runs ½ mile to the north west.

== Landmarks ==
Features of interest include the red-brick St Andrew's Methodist Church (1866), which has an associated Grade II listed lychgate and war memorial dating from around 1919 leading to a small cemetery. Aston House Farm is a Grade II listed, black-and-white timber farmhouse, dating from 1662. The village also has a Grade II listed red telephone box, an example of the 1935 K6 style designed by Sir Giles Gilbert Scott.

== Economy ==
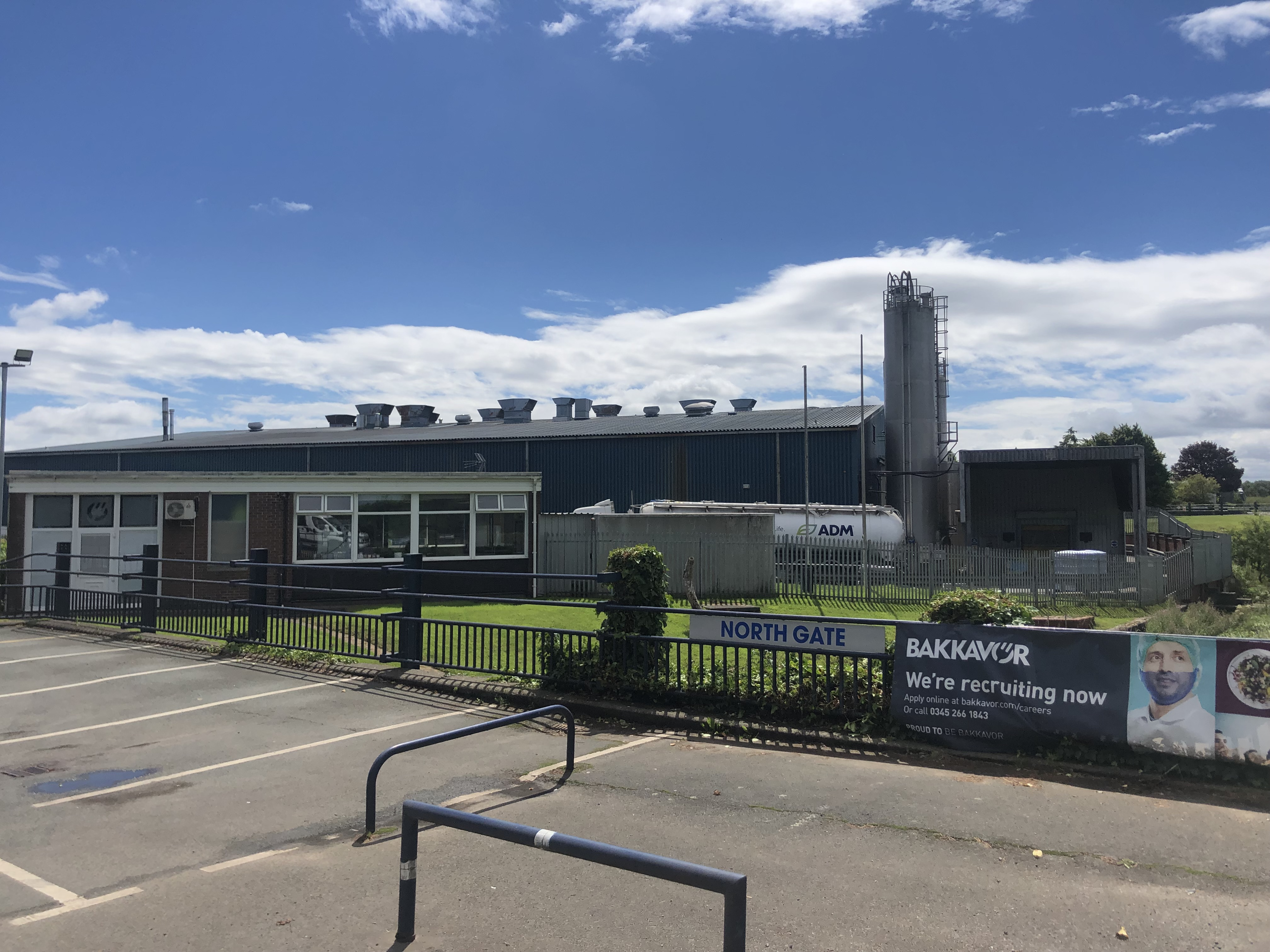
Bakkavör site in July 2022

It had a Unigate Creamery in the 1960s.

Lymeswold cheese was developed by Dairy Crest at Crudgington, and made at a site on the A530 from around 1984. But the scale of production was too much, and the product was not of the right standard, and by 1992 production ended.

Bakkavör now make most garlic baguettes in the UK, at the former Lymeswold site.

Aston Mill is an animal feed mill run by H J Lea Oakes Ltd, one of the few large industrial enterprises in this predominantly agricultural area.

== Connections with India ==
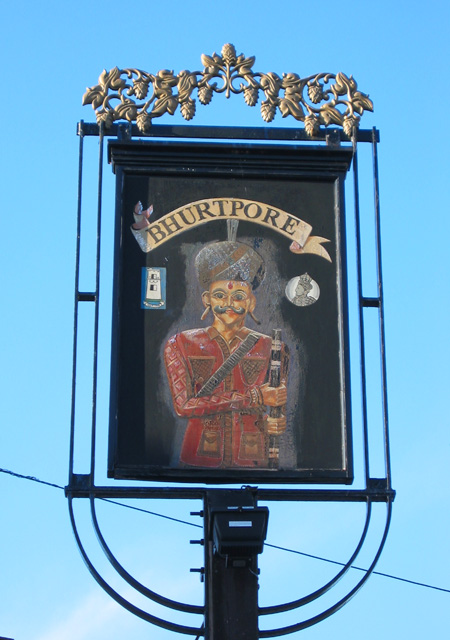
Bhurtpore Inn

The Bhurtpore Inn in the north of the village dates from 1720 and was first recorded as a public house in 1778. It was named to commemorate the Siege of Bhurtpore of 1825–26, at which local landlord Sir Stapleton Cotton, as Commander-in-Chief of the British forces, took the fort after a prolonged siege, earning the title of Viscount Combermere. The present Bhurtpore Inn, an independent hostelry serving a selection of real ales and curries, has won several awards, including The Good Pub Guide's National Beer Pub of the Year in 1997 and 1999, and CAMRA's Regional Pub of the Year 2005.
