= Listed buildings in Hunsterson =

Hunsterson is a former civil parish in Cheshire East, England. It contained seven buildings that are recorded in the National Heritage List for England as designated listed buildings, all of which are at Grade II. This grade is the lowest of the three gradings given to listed buildings and is applied to "buildings of national importance and special interest". The parish was almost entirely rural. The listed buildings consist of houses, farmhouses, cottages, a stable with paddock walls, and a church.

Name and location	Photograph	Date	Notes
Brownmoss Farmhouse; 53.00578°N 2.44775°W		16th or 17th century	The farmhouse has had repeated extensions, giving it a T-shaped plan. It is partly timber-framed with brick infill, and partly in brick, and it has a thatched roof covered in corrugated metal. The farmhouse is in two storeys, and has an entrance front with a gabled wing on the left. The windows are casements. Inside is a blocked inglenook fireplace.
Yewtree Cottage; 53.01139°N 2.45204°W		16th or 17th century	Front wall of the cottage is timber-framed with rendered infill, the rest in brick painted to resemble timber framing. The roof is thatched. The cottage has an L-shaped plan, and is in two storeys. The windows are casements, those in the upper floor being in dormers. Inside the cottage is an inglenook with a bressumer.
Greenfields; 53.00689°N 2.44031°W	—	Early to mid-17th century	A farmhouse in brick with a tiled roof, it is in two storeys with an attic. It has a three-bay entrance front with a central gabled porch flanked by canted bay windows. There is a lower two-storey wing to the left. The windows are casements.
Foxes Barn Cottage; 53.01235°N 2.46228°W	—	17th century	The cottage was extended later. The original part is timber-framed with brick infill on a plinth, the later part is in brick painted to resemble timber framing. The roofs are tiled. The cottage is in a single storey with an attic. The windows are casements, those in the upper floor being in gabled dormers and half-dormers.
Stable and walls of paddocks 53.01188°N 2.44401°W	—	Late 18th century	These were originally the paddocks to Doddington Hall. They consist of a stable block at the meeting point of four paddocks, and the wall surrounding the paddocks. The stable block has an entrance to all four paddocks. The paddock walls are 10–12 feet in height. The stable block also has a pitch hole and a loft door, and a hipped roof.
Pewit Hall; 52.99547°N 2.44105°W		Early 19th century	A brick farmhouse with a slate roof. It is in three storeys, and has a symmetrical three-bay entrance front. The windows are casements. There is also a long wing stretching from the rear.
St John's Church; 53.01311°N 2.44430°W		1837	The church was designed by Edward Lapidge and paid for by the Delves Broughton family of Doddington Hall. It is constructed in sandstone with a slate roof, and consists of a nave and chancel in one cell, and a northwest vestry. At the west end is a gabled porch, a triple lancet window, a bellcote, and angle buttresses that rise to pinnacles with spires.

== See also ==
- Listed buildings in Austerson
- Listed buildings in Buerton
- Listed buildings in Doddington
- Listed buildings in Hankelow
- Listed buildings in Hatherton
- Listed buildings in Walgherton
- Listed buildings in Woore
