= Hunsterson =

Hamlet in Cheshire, England

Coordinates: 53.011°N 2.452°W

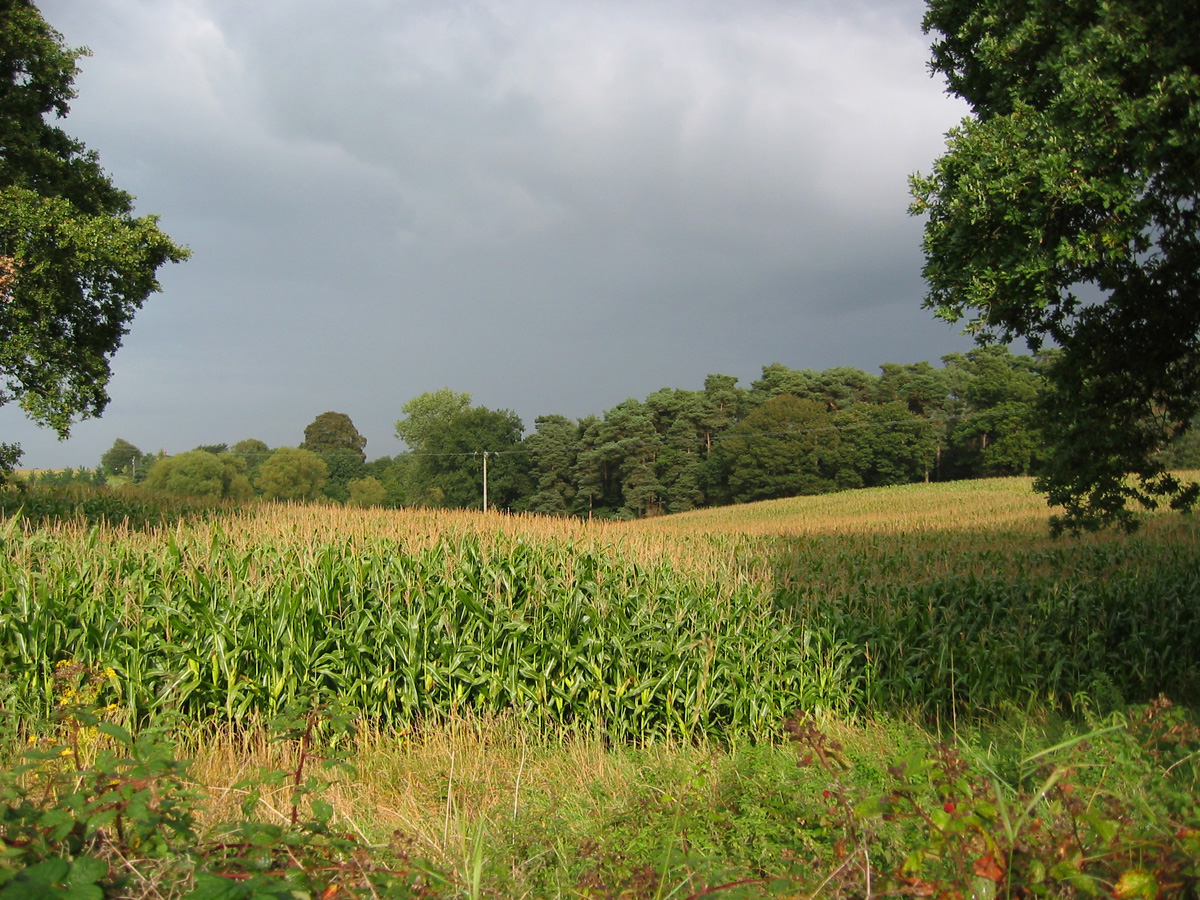
- Farmland in Hunsterson, showing Birchenhill Wood

- Location within Cheshire
- Population: 163 (2011)
- OS grid reference: SJ697461
- Civil parish: Doddington and District
- Unitary authority: Cheshire East
- Ceremonial county: Cheshire
- Region: North West
- Country: England
- Sovereign state: United Kingdom
- Post town: NANTWICH
- Postcode district: CW5
- Dialling code: 01270
- Police: Cheshire
- Fire: Cheshire
- Ambulance: North West
- UK Parliament: Crewe and Nantwich

Hunsterson is a hamlet (at SJ697461) and former civil parish, now in the parish of Doddington and District, in the unitary authority area of Cheshire East and the ceremonial county of Cheshire, England. The hamlet is located 2¾ miles to the north east of Audlem and 6 miles to the south of Crewe. The parish also included the settlements of Brown Moss, Four Lane End, Foxes Bank and Whittaker's Green. In 2011 the parish had a population of 163. Nearby villages include Audlem, Buerton, Hatherton and Hankelow.

== Governance ==
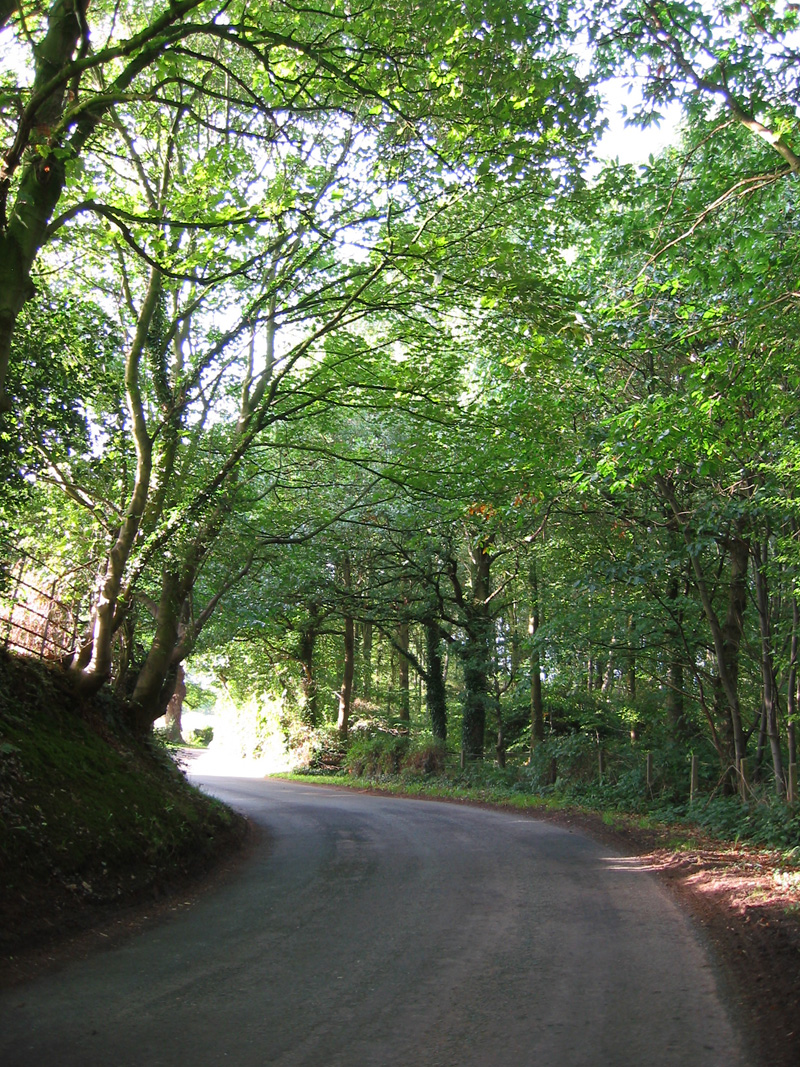
Hunsterson Road by Chapel Wood

Hunsterson is administered by Doddington and District Parish Council, which also includes the parishes of Blakenhall, Bridgemere, Checkley cum Wrinehill, Doddington and Lea. From 1974 the civil parish was served by Crewe and Nantwich Borough Council, which was succeeded on 1 April 2009 by the new unitary authority of Cheshire East. Hunsterson falls in the parliamentary constituency of Crewe and Nantwich, which has been represented by Edward Timpson since a by-election in 2008.

Hunsterson was formerly a township in the parish of Wybunbury, from 1866 Hunsterson was a civil parish in its own right, on 1 April 2023 the parish was abolished to form "Doddington and District".

== Geography and transport ==
The area is relatively flat with an average elevation of around 70 metres. The civil parish is predominantly rural, with the major land use being agricultural. Part of Doddington Park falls within the north east of the parish, including an unnamed lake south east of Pepperstreet Moss. Landscaped in the 18th century by Capability Brown, the park is listed at grade II by the National Register of Historic Parks and Gardens. There several areas of mixed woodland, particularly in the north east of the parish, including Black Covert, Chapel Wood, Pepperstreet Moss, The Reeds and part of Birchenhill Wood. Ridley's Pool lies within Chapel Wood, and numerous small meres and ponds are scattered across the parish. Birchall Brook forms part of the southern boundary, and several unnamed brooks run through the parish.

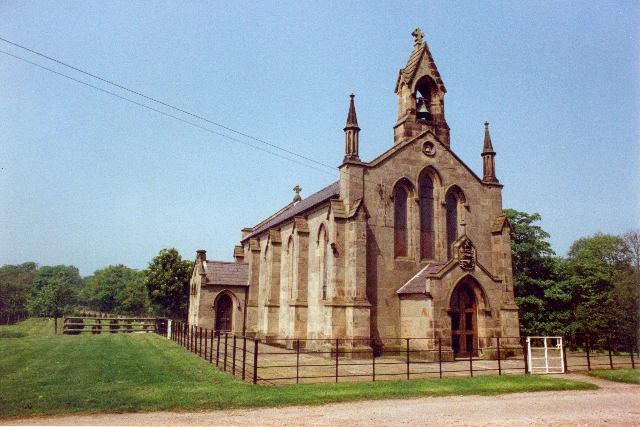
St John's Church, Hunsterson

Bridgemere Lane/Hunterson Road runs east–west through the parish between the A529 to the west and the A51 to the east. Hunsterson Road runs northwards from the junction of Bridgemere Lane and Hunterson Road towards Hatherton, and Pewit Lane runs southwards to Brown Moss; the crossroads at SJ697461 forms the centre of the hamlets of Hunsterson and Four Lane End. The South Cheshire Way runs through the north-west of the parish, in part following Bridgemere Lane.

== Demography ==
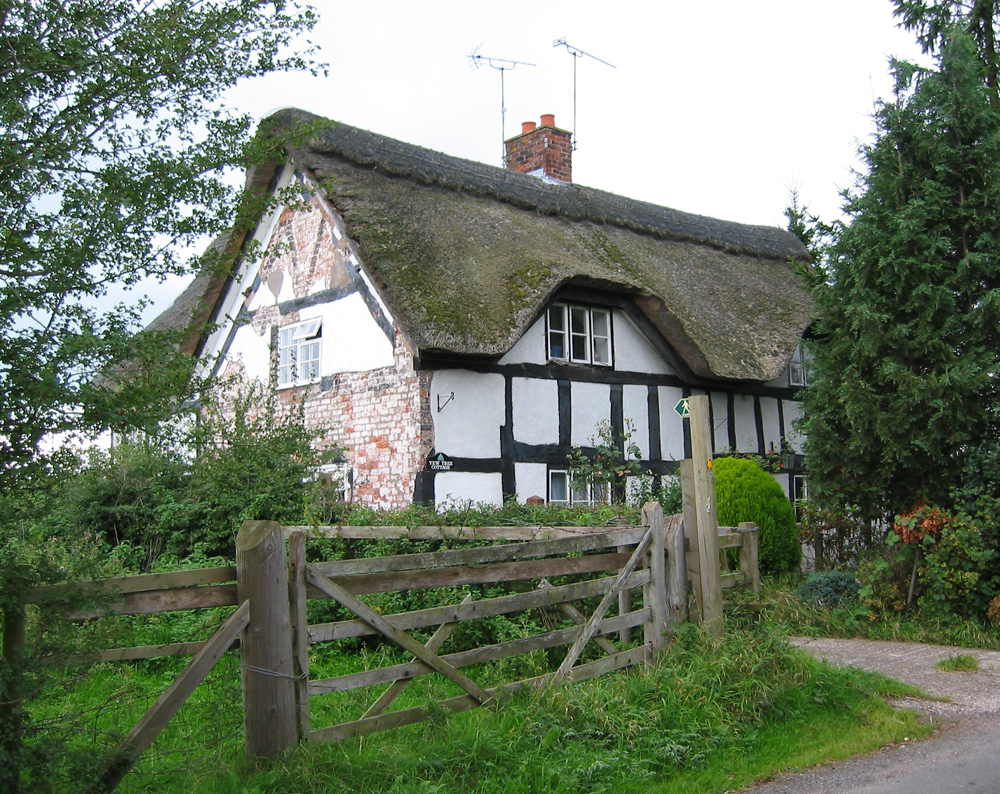
Yewtree Cottage, Pewit Lane

According to the 2001 census, the parish had a population of 156, increasing to 163 at the 2011 Census. The population has declined since 1800; the historical population figures were 235 (1801), 212 (1851), 165 (1901) and 159 (1951).

== Landmarks ==
St John's Church off Hunterson Road (at SJ702463) dates from 1836–7 and is by Edward Lapidge; it is listed at grade II. The church is in yellow sandstone and features a bellcote and a plaque with the coat of arms of the Delves-Broughton family of Doddington Hall. Originally a chapel, it became the parish church for Hunsterson and the nearby parishes of Bridgemere, Checkley cum Wrinehill and Doddington in 1840.

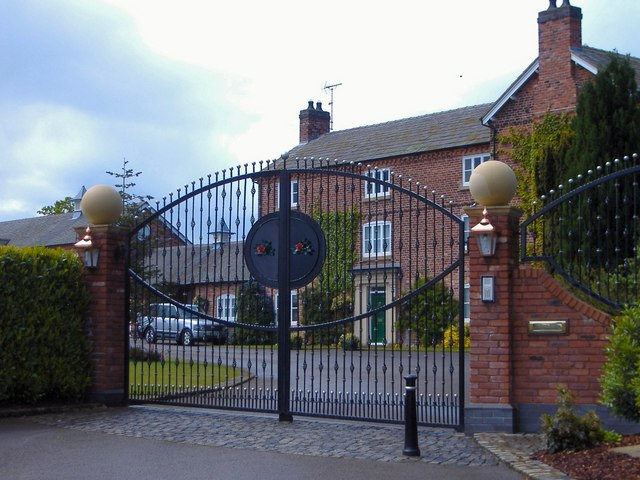
Pewit Hall, Pewit Lane

Three timber-framed buildings within the parish are listed at grade II. Yewtree Cottage and Brownmoss Farmhouse are both farmhouses on Pewit Lane which date originally from the 16th or 17th century, while Foxes Barn Cottage on Bridgemere Lane dates originally from the 17th century.

Greenfields is a red-brick farmhouse on Hunterson Road which dates from the early or mid 17th century. Pewit Hall is a three-storey red-brick farmhouse on Pewit Lane which dates from the early 19th century. Both are listed at grade II. Off Hunterson Road are the former paddocks and stables of Doddington Hall. In red brick with a stone coping, they date from the late 18th century and are also grade II listed.

== Education ==
There are no educational facilities in Hunsterson. The civil parish falls within the catchment areas of Bridgemere Church of England Primary School in Bridgemere and Brine Leas High School in Nantwich.

== See also ==
- Listed buildings in Hunsterson
