= Blakenhall, Cheshire =

Village in Cheshire, England

Coordinates: 53.021°N 2.419°W

Blakenhall
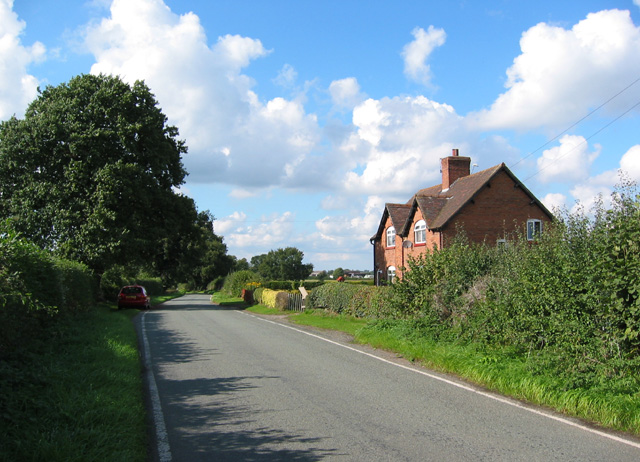
- Gonsley Cottages, Den Lane, Blakenhall

- Location within Cheshire
- Population: 283 (with Checkley cum Wrinehill and Lea; 2011)
- OS grid reference: SJ718471
- Civil parish: Doddington and District
- Unitary authority: Cheshire East
- Ceremonial county: Cheshire
- Region: North West
- Country: England
- Sovereign state: United Kingdom
- Post town: NANTWICH
- Postcode district: CW5
- Dialling code: 01270
- Police: Cheshire
- Fire: Cheshire
- Ambulance: North West
- UK Parliament: Crewe and Nantwich

Blakenhall is a small village and former civil parish, now in Doddington and District parish, in the unitary authority area of Cheshire East and the ceremonial county of Cheshire, England, about 7 miles (11 km) south-east of Nantwich. It lies on the county boundary with Staffordshire. The parish has an area of 654 hectares (1,620 acres) and also includes the small settlements of The Den and Gonsley Green, with a total population of 125 in 2001. Nearby villages include Wybunbury in Cheshire and Betley and Wrinehill in Staffordshire. Blakenhall was first recorded in the Domesday survey as Blachenhale, and the parish had one of Cheshire's early ironworks in the 17th and 18th centuries. The area is rural and predominantly agricultural, with small areas of ancient woodland and the nature reserve of Blakenhall Moss, a rejuvenating lowland raised bog. The Crewe-to-Stafford railway line runs through the parish and it is on the proposed route of HS2.

== History ==
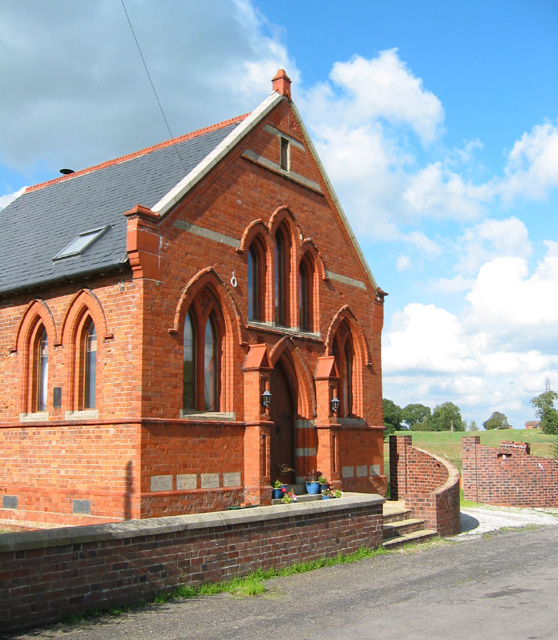
Former Methodist chapel

Blachenhale was a small manor at the time of the Domesday survey of 1086. It was tenanted by Gilbert the hunter Gilbert de Venables, and assessed at 12 shillings annually, an increase from 10 shillings before the Norman Conquest, when it was held by Godwin. Six households, five ploughlands, two plough teams, a wood measuring 2 by 1 leagues, and a hawk's eyrie were recorded. Manorial courts were once convened in the parish. During the Civil War, soldiers were housed here.

The earliest known forge in Cheshire was recorded nearby in 1619 on Checkley Brook at Tib or Tip Green, just on the Cheshire side of the Staffordshire border, probably the same as one subsequently recorded in Wrinehill township, now in Staffordshire. By the time of the Civil War, Doddington iron foundry had been founded on Checkley Brook, at the edge of Blakenhall parish on Mill Lane, near the boundary with Doddington – one of four ironworks then recorded in Cheshire. It was owned by Sir Thomas Delves of Delves Hall, and produced hammers and anvils; in 1667, it output 500 tons of pig iron. The ironworks remained in operation in 1766 and appear on P. P. Burdett's 1777 map, but had closed by 1781. A building on the site of the ironworks was being used as a coin mill in 1892. Later it was a flour mill which had a "French Bun" millstone from the River Seine; it closed in 1925.

The parish fell within the estate of Doddington Hall prior to 1917. In the late 19th century it had a school. For several years in around 1820, the Methodist missionary Nathaniel Turner (1793–1864) lived and preached in the parish, which was associated with his family, and in 1900 a Wesleyan Methodist chapel was constructed. Agriculture was the predominant occupation for men in 1881, with 60 of 68 men recorded in the census as working in that sector.

== Governance ==
Blakenhall is administered by Doddington and District Parish Council, which also administers the parishes of Bridgemere, Checkley cum Wrinehill, Doddington, Hunsterson and Lea. From 1974 the civil parish was served by Crewe and Nantwich Borough Council, which was succeeded on 1 April 2009 by the new unitary authority of Cheshire East. Blakenhall falls in the parliamentary constituency of Crewe and Nantwich, which has been represented by Kieran Mullan since 2019, after being represented by Laura Smith (2017–19), Edward Timpson (2008–17) and Gwyneth Dunwoody (1983–2008).

Blakenhall was formerly a township in the parish of Wybunbury, in 1866 Blakenhall became a civil parish. On 1 April 2023 the parish was abolished to form "Doddington and District".

== Geography, ecology and transport ==
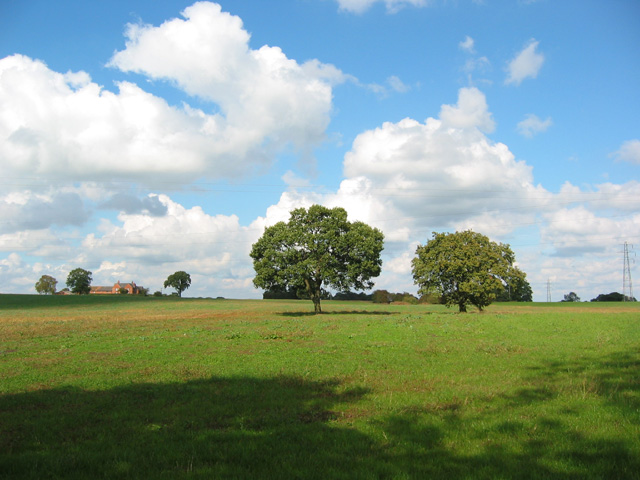
Pasture north of Blakenhall village

The civil parish has an area of 654 hectares (1,620 acres). The area is rural and predominantly agricultural; farms include Half Moon Farm, Gonsley Green Farm, Lower Den Farm, Manor Farm, Doddington Mill Farm and Grange Farm. Forge Brook runs along the western boundary, Checkley Brook along the southern boundary and Mere Gutter and a tributary along or near part of the eastern boundary. Parts of these watercourses lie in steep-sided valleys. The terrain is undulating with low hills; the high point of 94 metres (308 ft) is in the south-east corner of the parish, and there is a trig point at 85 metres (279 ft) near Manor Farm, just to the north of Blakenhall village.

There are several areas of woodland, including Mill Covert, Robin Knight's Rough and Ash Coppice by Forge and Checkley Brooks, as well as Blakenhall Moss. Some is ancient woodland: Ash Coppice has hazel, which was historically coppiced, together with some alder, with bluebells among the vegetation; Robin Knight's Rough has alder, with vegetation including bluebells, spindle and alternate-leaved golden saxifrage. Both woods are local wildlife sites. Mill Covert is marked on tithe maps and might also be ancient. Numerous small meres and ponds are scattered across the area, especially within the woodland. Checkley Brook/Forge Brook, a tributary of the River Weaver, forms an important wildlife corridor. The woodland of Blakenhall Moss, a Cheshire Wildlife Trust (CWT) nature reserve, was formerly a lowland raised bog, and has been managed by CWT to restore it to this state by interrupting drainage and felling trees, as part of the Meres and Mosses of the Marches Nature Improvement Area initiative funded by the Department for Environment, Food and Rural Affairs. The drier areas have oak and downy birch woodland with bluebells, and the area supports birdlife including marsh tits, owls and sparrowhawks.

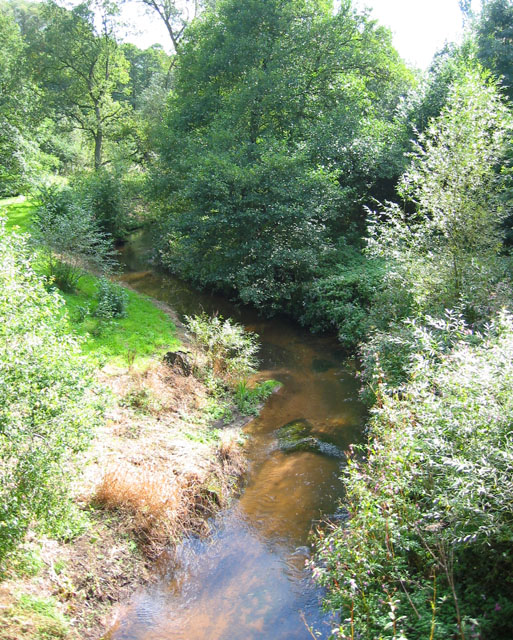
Forge Brook and Mill Covert

The Crewe-to-Stafford railway line runs through the parish from the north west to the south east; there are no stations within Blakenhall. The proposed route of Phase 2a of the HS2 railway line runs through the parish. Den Lane crosses the parish from the north west to the south east, crossing the railway at Den Bridge near the eastern boundary. Mill Lane runs south west from Den Lane, connecting with the A51 in the adjacent parish of Doddington. A short stretch of Checkley Lane, including Checkley Bridge over Checkley Brook, falls within the south of the parish. Blakenhall village lies along Mill Lane.

== Demography ==
According to the 2001 census, the civil parish had a total population of 125, a decline from the 19th-century figures. At the 2011 census, the population was recorded – jointly with the adjacent civil parishes of Checkley cum Wrinehill and Lea – as 283 in 115 households. Historical population figures are 199 (1801), 226 (1851), 196 (1901) and 169 (1951).

== Landmarks ==
The parish contains one building designated by English Heritage as a listed building. This is Blakenhall Farmhouse, which is listed at Grade II. Grade II is the lowest of the three gradings given to listed buildings and is granted to "buildings of national importance and special interest". The farmhouse dates from the 17th century, and is constructed in brick with a tiled roof. It is in two storeys, and has a three-bay entrance front with three gabled dormers. Inside the farmhouse is an inglenook with a bressumer. A red-brick former Wesleyan Methodist chapel in Blakenhall village dates from 1900.

== Education ==
There are no educational facilities in Blakenhall. The civil parish falls within the catchment areas of Shavington Academy and Wybunbury Delves Church of England Primary School.
