= Bridgemere =

Village in Cheshire, England

Coordinates: 53.006°N 2.423°W

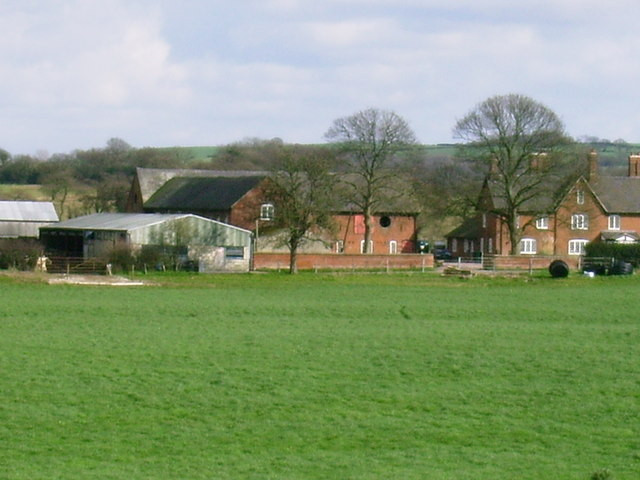
- Farmland near Bridgemere Farm

- Location within Cheshire
- Population: 148 (2011)
- OS grid reference: SJ717454
- Civil parish: Doddington and District
- Unitary authority: Cheshire East
- Ceremonial county: Cheshire
- Region: North West
- Country: England
- Sovereign state: United Kingdom
- Post town: NANTWICH
- Postcode district: CW5
- Dialling code: 01270
- Police: Cheshire
- Fire: Cheshire
- Ambulance: North West
- UK Parliament: Crewe and Nantwich

Bridgemere is a village (at SJ717454) and former civil parish, now in Doddington and District parish, in the unitary authority area of Cheshire East and the ceremonial county of Cheshire, England. It is around 7 miles (11 km) south east of Nantwich and 12 miles (19 km) west of Stoke-on-Trent. The southern boundary of the parish is on the border with Shropshire. The civil parish also included the small settlements of Admiral's Gorse, Parrah Green, Prince Hill, Seven Stars and Wheel Green. In 2011 the parish had a population of 148. Nearby towns include Crewe in Cheshire, Market Drayton and Whitchurch in Shropshire, and villages include Blakenhall, Buerton and Hankelow in Cheshire, Madeley, Staffordshire and Woore, Shropshire.

== History ==
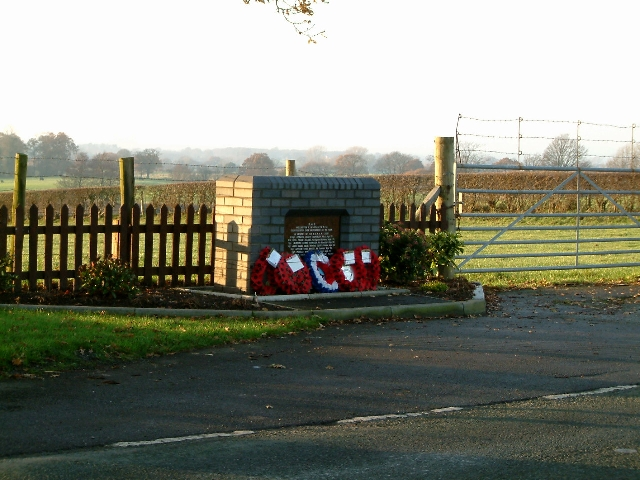
Memorial to airmen

During the medieval period, it had an iron foundry.

One of the two major coaching roads in Cheshire ran from London via Bridgemere to Nantwich, Chester and on to Holyhead in Wales; it became one of the first turnpike roads in the county in 1743. A coach service between London and Chester ran three times a week from 1657, taking four days over the journey; by 1780, a daily service ran from London to Holyhead, and from 1784 the mail coach used the road. The road was improved after 1810, but its use dwindled after 1820 with the coming of the railways. Bridgemere parish had three inns in 1765, one of which was named the Holly Bush. By 1801, there was only a single inn, which had closed by 1821.

On 28 October 1944, during World War II, a Wellington bomber from RAF Chipping Warden in Oxfordshire crashed at Prince Hill on a training exercise. A memorial to the six airmen who died in the crash was dedicated in 2003.

In 1972, 30 acres (120,000 m^{2}) of land near Bridgemere Hall were landscaped and stocked with waterfowl to form Bridgemere Wildlife Park. The park expanded into a zoo before its closure in 1992.

== Governance ==
Bridgemere is administered by Doddington and District Parish Council, which also includes the parishes of Blakenhall, Checkley cum Wrinehill, Doddington, Hunsterson and Lea. From 1974 the civil parish was served by Crewe and Nantwich Borough Council, which was succeeded on 1 April 2009 by the new unitary authority of Cheshire East. Bridgemere falls in the parliamentary constituency of Crewe and Nantwich, which has been represented by Kieran Mullan since 2019, after being represented by Laura Smith (2017–19), Edward Timpson (2008–17) and Gwyneth Dunwoody (1983–2008).

Bridgemere was originally a township in the ancient parish of Wybunbury in the Nantwich Hundred. From 1866 Bridgemere was a civil parish in its own right, on 1 April 2023 the parish was abolished to form "Doddington and District".

== Geography and transport ==
The civil parish had a total area of 1,130 acres (460 ha). The terrain is gently undulating, with high points of 110 metres at SJ720447 south of Admiral's Gorse and 102 metres at Prince Hill (SJ717434). The area is predominantly rural, with the major land use being agricultural. There are several small areas of woodland within the parish, including Acorn Coppice, Lea's Wood, Harrow's Wood, Threeper's Drumble and part of Shaw's Rough. Forge Brook and several other unnamed brooks run through the parish, and there are many scattered small meres and ponds. A small area of Doddington Park, including part of Doddington Pool, falls within the civil parish north of Hunterson Road. Landscaped in the 18th century by Capability Brown, the park is listed at grade II by the National Register of Historic Parks and Gardens.

The A51 trunk road runs north–south through the civil parish. Hunterson Road (Bridgemere Lane) runs east–west towards the north of the parish, and Dingle Lane runs southwards from Hunterson Road; the village is centred on the junction of the two lanes.

== Demographics ==
In 2006, the total population of the civil parish was estimated as 130. The 2001 census recorded a population of 133 in 49 households, the population increasing to 148 at the 2011 Census. The historical population figures for the parish were 125 (1664), 230 (1801), 233 (1821), 220 (1851), 149 (1901) and 141 (1951).

== Bridgemere Garden World ==
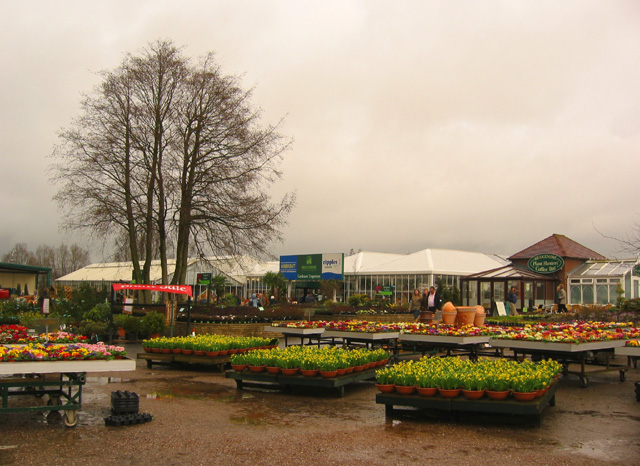
Bridgemere Garden World

Bridgemere Garden World is on the A51 about 2 km south of the village. With a total area of 52 hectares (130 acres), it is one of the largest garden centres in Europe, and receives around 1.8 million annual visitors. The garden centre sells over five thousand plant varieties, most of which are grown locally, as well as garden furniture and accessories. A 7-acre (28,000 m^{2}) display garden dating from around 1985 is open to the public free of charge. Designed to inspire amateur gardeners, it is composed of more than twenty separate gardens, including English country, Victorian, Mediterranean, woodland, water, rose and patio gardens. The display also includes recreations of prize-winning gardens from the Tatton Park and Chelsea Flower Shows, as well as the garden in which the 1993 television series Gardener's Diary was filmed. Other facilities include a restaurant and coffee shop.

It was founded in 1961 as a small rose nursery with three employees, described as "a little garden shed in a small field". By 1990, the garden centre employed 140 people and included 25 acres (100,000 m^{2}) of plant displays, as well as the largest collection of house plants in Europe. Founder John Ravenscroft holds the Royal Horticultural Society's Veitch Memorial Medal and was awarded the RHS Victoria Medal of Honour in 2008. He also won a lifetime achievement award from Garden Retail in 2007.

In 2006, Bridgemere Garden World was acquired for £15 million by Wyevale Garden Centres. Wyevale announced plans in 2008 to demolish the existing buildings and redevelop the site.

== Other landmarks ==
- Bridgemere Wesleyan Methodist Chapel was built in 1831.
- Bridgemere Hall (SJ716455) is a 19th-century mansion on Hunterson Road.
- An RAF war memorial is located by the A51 at SJ721446.

== Education ==
Bridgemere Church of England Primary School is located on Bridgemere Lane at SJ713456, and serves the civil parish of Bridgemere as well as the adjacent parishes of Hunsterson and Checkley cum Wrinehill. Bridgemere falls within the catchment area of Brine Leas High School in Nantwich.
