= Listed buildings in Doddington, Cheshire =

Doddington is a former civil parish in Cheshire East, England. It contained eight buildings that are recorded in the National Heritage List for England as designated listed buildings. Of these, two are listed at Grade I, the highest grade, one is listed at Grade II*, the middle grade, and the others are at Grade II. Much of the parish was occupied by Doddington Park, which contains all the listed buildings. The major buildings are Doddington Hall and its predecessor, Delves Hall. The other listed structures include stables and a boathouse associated with Doddington Hall, and Demesne Farm with associated buildings.

== Key ==
| Grade | Criteria |
|---|---|
| I | Buildings of exceptional interest, sometimes considered to be internationally important |
| II* | Particularly important buildings of more than special interest |
| II | Buildings of national importance and special interest |

== Buildings ==
| Name and location | Photograph | Date | Notes | Grade |
|---|---|---|---|---|
| Delves Hall; 53.01970°N 2.43563°W | | 1364 | This was built first as a free-standing fortified tower, then became incorporated as part of a house. The house was demolished in about 1777 when Doddington Hall was built, leaving the tower standing alone. It is in sandstone with a slate roof. The tower is square, in three storeys, and with corner turrets, the top of the tower and the turrets being battlemented. An external Jacobean imperial staircase leads to a half-landing on which is an Ionic column supporting a naked female figure. On the ground floor are statues of the Black Prince, Audley, and his four squires. | I |
| Demesne House; 53.02244°N 2.44258°W | — | c. 1771–90 | This originated as four cottages, later converted into one house. It was designed by Samuel Wyatt, and is built in brick with a slate roof. The house is in two storeys, its central part projecting forward and gabled. To each side there are five bays. The windows in the ground floor are sashes, and in the upper floor they are casements. There are additions at the rear. | II |
| Barn and attached buildings, Demesne Farm; 53.02205°N 2.44215°W | — | c. 1771–90 | These were designed by Samuel Wyatt, and are in brick with roofs of slate or corrugated iron. The central building is the barn with two transepts on each side. At each end of the barn are two attached ranges of farm buildings forming V-shapes. The transepts have pedimental gables and openings. Other features include Diocletian windows, and various other windows, doors and openings. | II* |
| Woodside Cottages; 53.02164°N 2.44171°W | — | c. 1771–90 | A row of cottages designed by Samuel Wyatt. They are in brick with a slate roof. The cottages are in two storeys and have a front of nine bays. The windows are casements. | II |
| Doddington Hall; 53.01491°N 2.43422°W | | 1777–90 | The country house was designed by Samuel Wyatt, and is built in sandstone with a slate roof. It is in three storeys and has a symmetrical front of nine bays. The outer and the three central bays project forward, and over the central bays is a pediment. The bottom floor is rusticated, and has Diocletian windows in the outer bays; all the other windows are sashes. An outer double staircase leads up to a doorway flanked by columns and under a blind arch containing a Coade stone medallion containing a sign of the Zodiac. There are similar medallions over the first floor windows in the outer bays. On the centre of the rear is a bow window with a shallow dome. The east front is in three bays, and the west front is joined to the service wing. | I |
| Stable block, Doddington Hall; 53.01514°N 2.43582°W | — | 1777–90 | Designed by Samuel Wyatt, the stable block is in brick on a stone plinth, with stone dressings and a slate roof. It is in one and two storeys, and has an east front of nine bays. The central bay projects forward and has a pedimental gable containing a 19th-century clock. Above the gable is a wooden cupola. The bay contains an archway with a Diocletian window above. The windows in the lateral are sashes, also with a Diocletian window in each of the outer bays. | II |
| Gates, piers and walling 53.01764°N 2.42492°W | — | 1777–90 | These stand at the entrance to the park from London Road. There are two pairs of square rusticated stone gate piers with pyramidal caps. Between the central piers are decorative wrought iron gates, and between the outer piers are wicket gates. Outside these are curved screen walls. | II |
| Boathouse, Doddington Hall; 53.01461°N 2.43213°W | — | Late 18th century | Probably designed by Samuel Wyatt, it is built in sandstone and brick, and partly covered in earth. It consists of three tunnel vaulted chambers, with arches at both ends. On the lake front the arches have keystones, the one in the central arch being carved with an animal head. | II |

== See also ==
- Listed buildings in Hunsterson
- Listed buildings in Checkley cum Wrinehill
- Listed buildings in Lea
- Listed buildings in Blakenhall
- Listed buildings in Walgherton
- Listed buildings in Hatherton
