= Checkley cum Wrinehill =

Former civil parish in Cheshire, England

Coordinates: 53.016°N 2.383°W

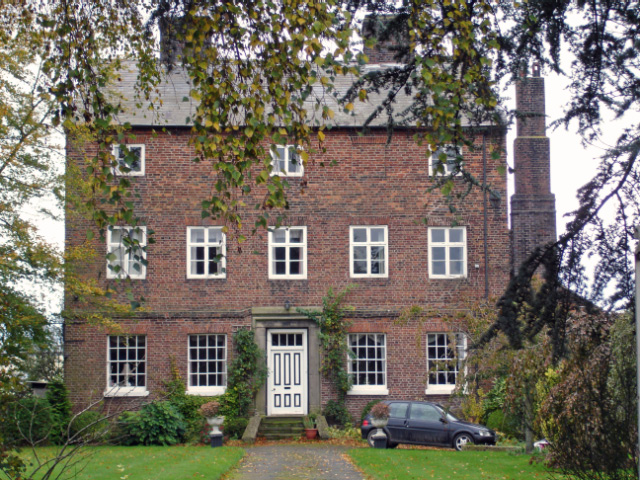
- Checkley Hall

- Location within Cheshire
- Population: 129 (2001)
- OS grid reference: SJ742466
- Civil parish: Doddington and District
- Unitary authority: Cheshire East
- Ceremonial county: Cheshire
- Region: North West
- Country: England
- Sovereign state: United Kingdom
- Post town: NANTWICH
- Postcode district: CW5
- Dialling code: 01270
- Police: Cheshire
- Fire: Cheshire
- Ambulance: North West
- UK Parliament: Crewe and Nantwich

Checkley cum Wrinehill is a former civil parish, now in the parish of Doddington and District, in the unitary authority area of Cheshire East and the ceremonial county of Cheshire, England, which lies adjacent to the boundaries with Shropshire and Staffordshire. The hamlet of Checkley (at SJ734462) lies to the south east of Crewe and to the west of Newcastle-under-Lyme. The parish is largely rural but also includes the small settlements of Bunkers Hill and Randilow. Wrinehill was formerly included in the parish, becoming part of Staffordshire in 1965. Nearby villages include Blakenhall, Bridgemere, Madeley and Woore. In 2001 the parish had a population of 129.

== Governance ==
Checkley cum Wrinehill is administered by Doddington and District Parish Council, which also includes the parishes of Blakenhall, Bridgemere, Doddington, Hunsterson and Lea. From 1974 the civil parish was served by Crewe and Nantwich Borough Council, which was succeeded on 1 April 2009 by the new unitary authority of Cheshire East. Checkley cum Wrinehill falls in the parliamentary constituency of Crewe and Nantwich, which has been represented by Kieran Mullan since 2019, after being represented by Laura Smith (2017–19), Edward Timpson (2008–17) and Gwyneth Dunwoody (1983–2008).

Checkley cum Wrinehill was formerly a township in the parish of Wybunbury, from 1866 Checkley cum Wrinehill was a civil parish in its own right, on 1 April 2023 the parish was abolished to form "Doddington and District".

== Geography and transport ==
The mixed woodland of Checkley Wood is included in the parish. The A51 and the Crewe–Stafford railway line run immediately to the west and east of the parish, respectively.

== Demographics ==
According to the 2001 census, the parishes of Checkley cum Wrinehill and Lea had a combined population of 129. At the 2011 Census the civil parish population was measured as less than 100. Details are included in the civil parish of Blakenhall, Cheshire. The parish formerly had population figures of 240 (1801), 203 (1851), 206 (1901) and 220 (1951).

== See also ==
- Listed buildings in Checkley cum Wrinehill
- Checkley Hall
