= Henry Delves =

Henry Delves may refer to:

- Henry Delves (politician), MP for Cheshire (UK Parliament constituency)
- Sir Henry Delves, 2nd Baronet (1597–1663), of the Delves baronets, High Sheriff of Cheshire

== See also ==
- Delves (disambiguation)
