= Lea, Cheshire =

Former civil parish in Cheshire, England

Coordinates: 53.035°N 2.426°W

Lea
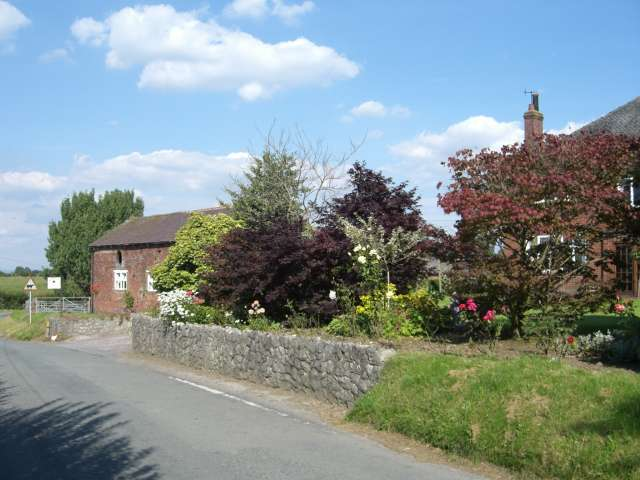
- Lea Farm

- Location within Cheshire
- Population: 25 (2001)
- OS grid reference: SJ714487
- Civil parish: Doddington and District
- Unitary authority: Cheshire East
- Ceremonial county: Cheshire
- Region: North West
- Country: England
- Sovereign state: United Kingdom
- Post town: NANTWICH
- Postcode district: CW5
- Dialling code: 01270
- Police: Cheshire
- Fire: Cheshire
- Ambulance: North West
- UK Parliament: Crewe and Nantwich

Lea is a former civil parish, now in the parish of Doddington and District, in the unitary authority area of Cheshire East and the ceremonial county of Cheshire, England, which lies to the north east of Audlem and to the south of Crewe. The parish was predominantly rural, but it includes the hamlet of Lea Forge (at SJ707486). Nearby villages include Betley, Blakenhall, Hough, Walgherton and Wybunbury.

According to the 2001 census, it had a population of 25. At the time of the 2011 Census the population remained less than 100. Details are included in the civil parish of Blakenhall, Cheshire.

== Governance ==
Lea was administered by Doddington and District Parish Council, which also includes the parishes of Blakenhall, Bridgemere, Checkley cum Wrinehill, Doddington and Hunsterson. From 1974 the civil parish was served by Crewe and Nantwich Borough Council, which was succeeded on 1 April 2009 by the new unitary authority of Cheshire East . Lea falls in the parliamentary constituency of Crewe and Nantwich, which has been represented by Kieran Mullan since 2019, after being represented by Laura Smith (2017–19), Edward Timpson (2008–17) and Gwyneth Dunwoody (1983–2008).

Lea was formerly a township in the parish of Wybunbury, from 1866 Lea was a civil parish in its own right, on 1 April 2023 the parish was abolished to form "Doddington and District".

== Geography and transport ==
The parish includes several areas of mixed woodland, including Lea Park. The South Cheshire Way long-distance footpath runs through the parish. The A51 runs immediately to its west.

== Landmarks ==
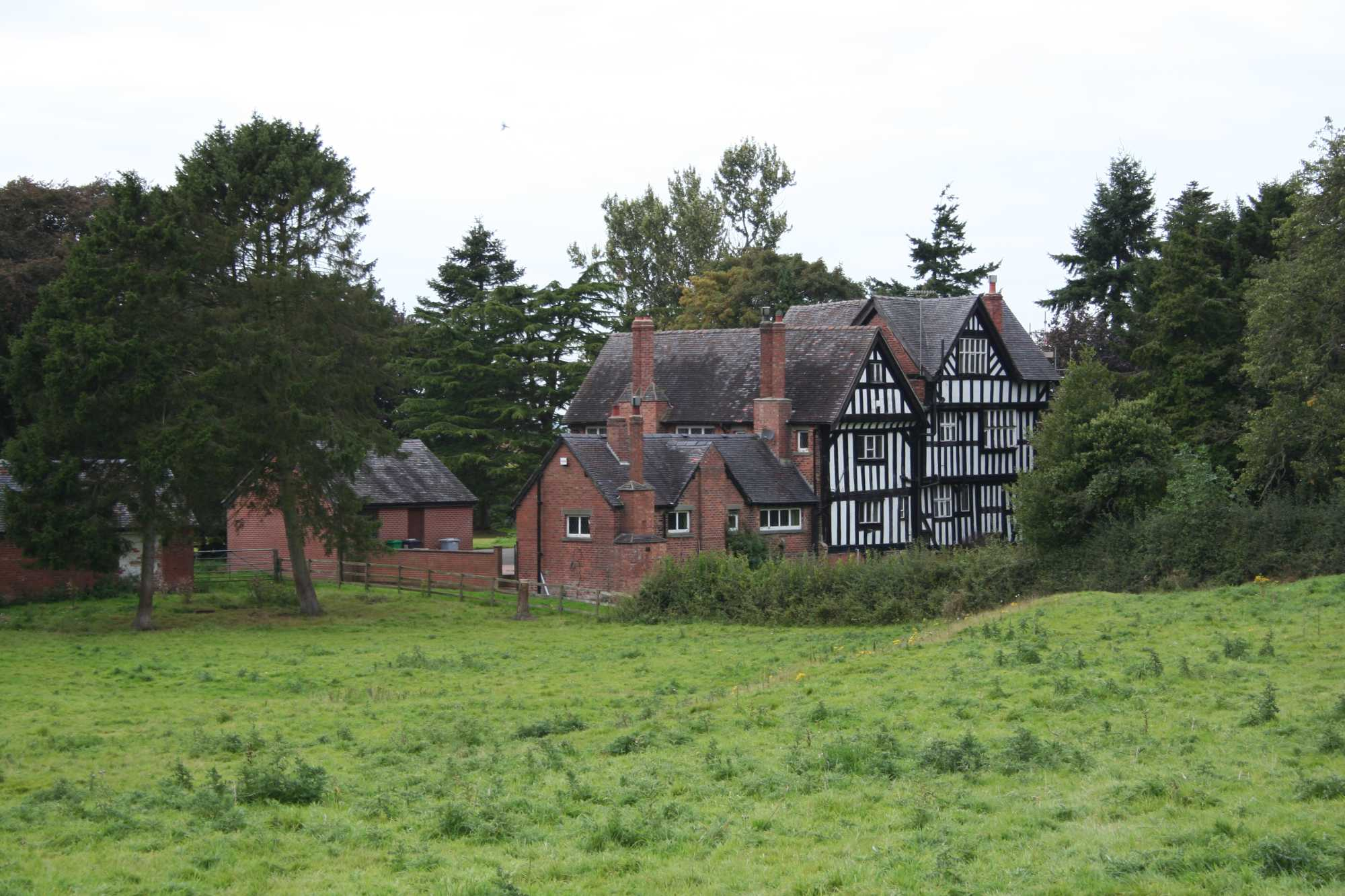
Lea Hall

There is one listed building in the parish. This is a timber-framed house dating from the 16th century named Lea Hall, which was extended in the 19th and 20th centuries. It is designated by English Heritage at Grade II*. This grade is the middle of the three grades of listing designated by English Heritage, and is granted to "particularly important buildings of more than special interest".
