= Doddington, Cheshire =

Former civil parish in Cheshire, England

Coordinates: 53.027°N 2.438°W

Doddington
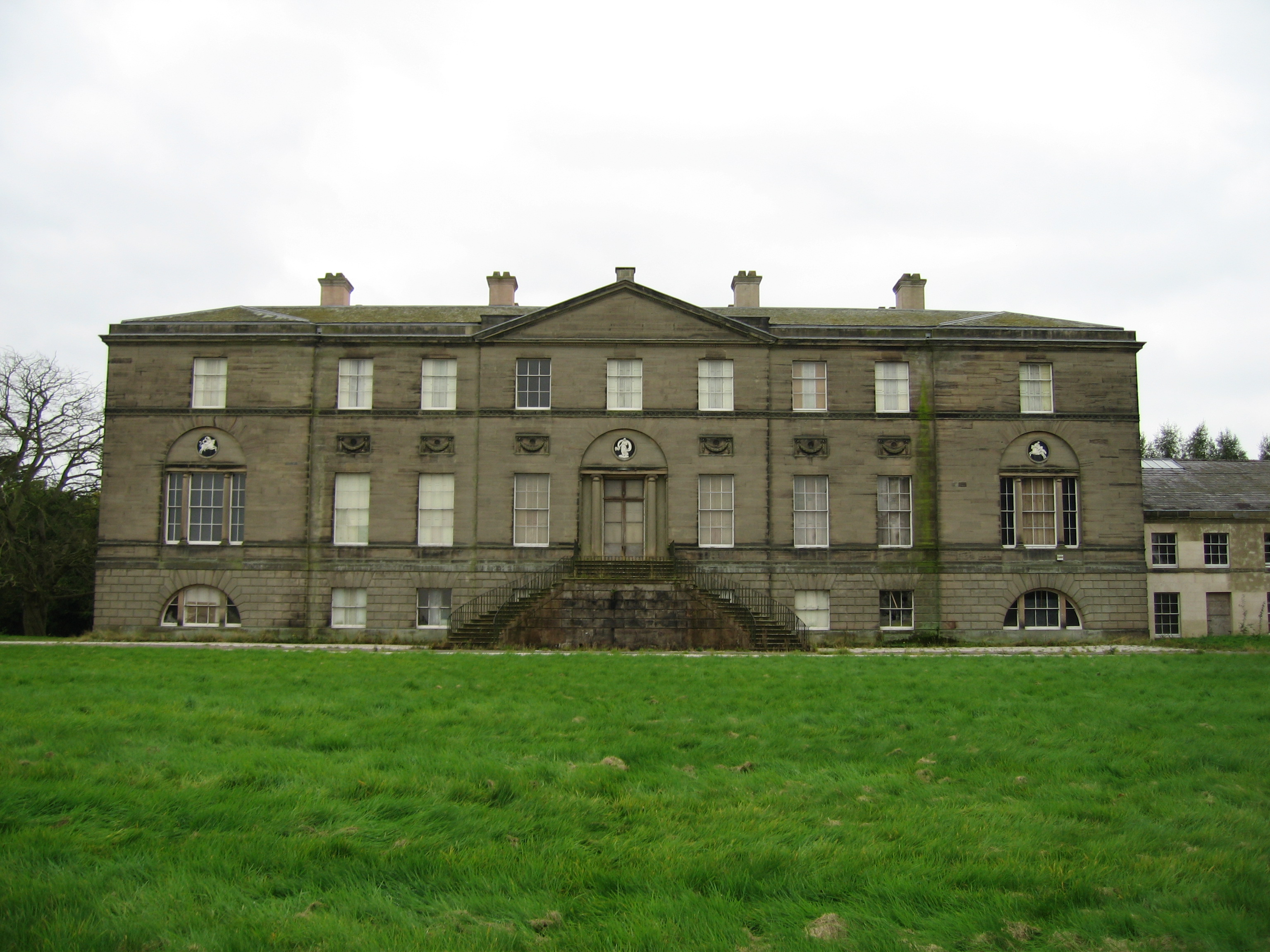
- Doddington Hall

- Location within Cheshire
- Population: 44 (2001 census)
- OS grid reference: SJ707478
- Civil parish: Doddington and District
- Unitary authority: Cheshire East
- Ceremonial county: Cheshire
- Region: North West
- Country: England
- Sovereign state: United Kingdom
- Post town: NANTWICH
- Postcode district: CW5
- Police: Cheshire
- Fire: Cheshire
- Ambulance: North West

Doddington is a former civil parish, now in Doddington and District parish, in the unitary authority area of Cheshire East and the ceremonial county of Cheshire, England, which lies to the north east of Audlem and to the south of Crewe. Nearby villages include Blakenhall, Bridgemere, Checkley, Hatherton, Walgherton and Wybunbury. The A51 runs north–south through the parish.

In 2001, the civil parish had a population of 44. At the 2011 census the population remained less than 100. Details are included in the civil parish of Plumley.

== Governance ==
Doddington is administered by Doddington and District Parish Council, which also includes the parishes of Blakenhall, Bridgemere, Checkley cum Wrinehill, Hunsterson and Lea. From 1974 the civil parish was served by Crewe and Nantwich Borough Council, which was succeeded on 1 April 2009 by the new unitary authority of Cheshire East. Doddington falls in the parliamentary constituency of Crewe and Nantwich, which has been represented by Kieran Mullan since 2019, after being represented by Laura Smith (2017–19), Edward Timpson (2008–17) and Gwyneth Dunwoody (1983–2008).

Doddington was formerly a township in the parish of Wybunbury, and from 1866 Doddington was a civil parish in its own right. On 1 April 2023, the parish was abolished to form Doddington and District parish.

== Doddington Park ==
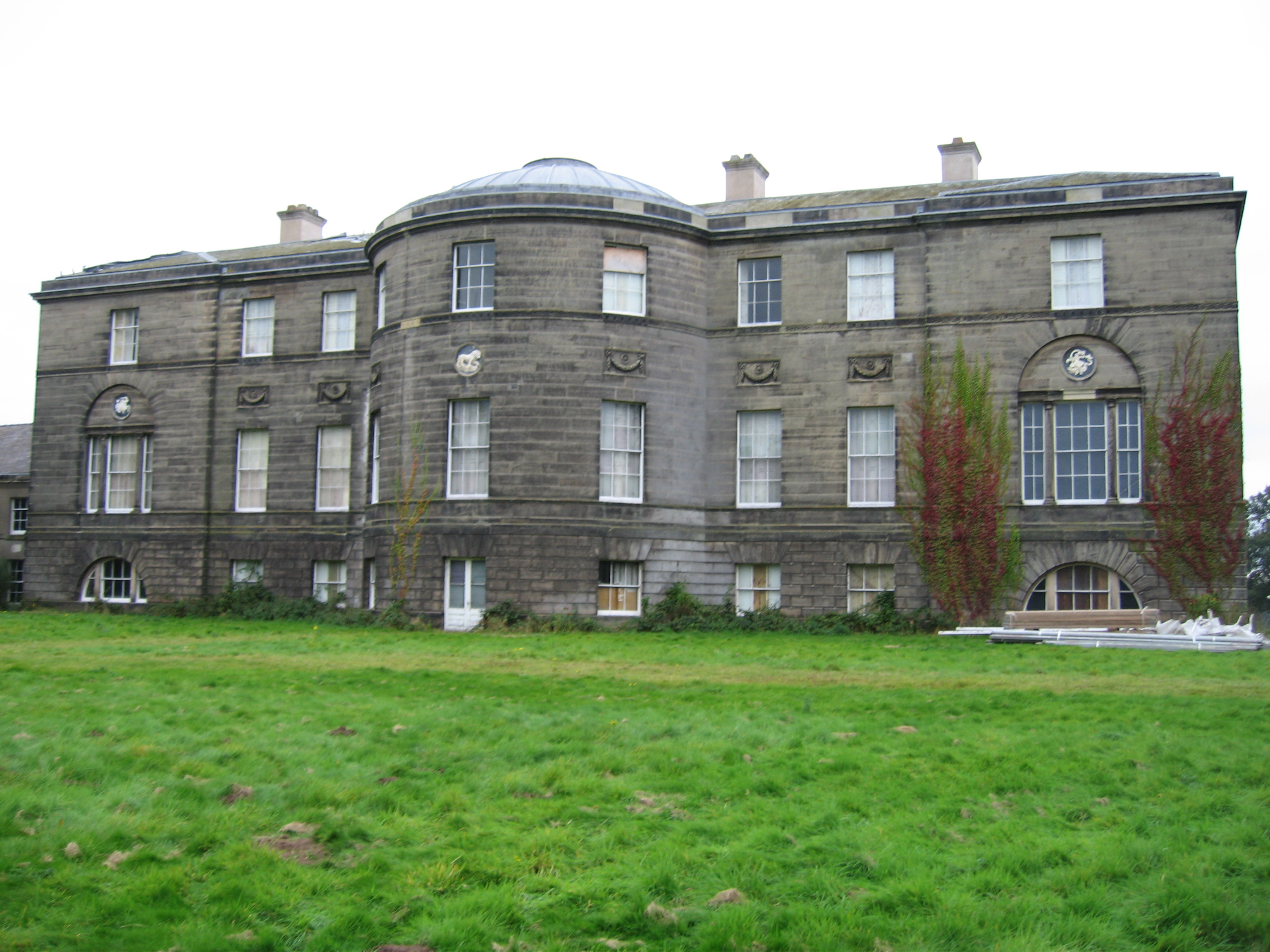
Doddington Hall (rear)

The 18th-century mansion of Doddington Hall, by Samuel Wyatt, is located within the parish. The park falls mainly within Doddington, with parts in the adjacent civil parishes of Bridgemere and Hunsterson. It was landscaped by Capability Brown and includes the tower of the 14th-century Doddington Castle, St John's Church, and several meres and areas of woodland, including Chapel Wood and George's Wood. Also within the grounds is the large mere of Doddington Pool (or Doddington Lake), which is used for sailing, fishing and bird watching. The National Register of Historic Parks and Gardens lists 100 hectares of the grounds at grade II.

== Demographics ==
According to the 2001 census, the parish had a population of 44. The parish had population figures of 51 (1801), 86 (1851), 70 (1901) and 1094 (1951).

== See also ==
- Listed buildings in Doddington, Cheshire
