= Listed buildings in Hatherton, Cheshire =

Hatherton is a civil parish in Cheshire East, England. It contains nine buildings that are recorded in the National Heritage List for England as designated listed buildings. Of these, one is listed at Grade II*, the middle grade, and the others are at Grade II. The parish is almost entirely rural. Apart from a disused bridge, the listed buildings are all domestic properties.

== Key ==
Grade	Criteria
II*	Particularly important buildings of more than special interest
II	Buildings of national importance and special interest

== Buildings ==
Name and location	Photograph	Date	Notes	Grade
Yew Tree Farmhouse; 53.01117°N 2.48094°W	—	16th century	A timber-framed house on a brick plinth with brick infill and a tiled roof. It is in two storeys.	II
Birchall Moss Hall; 53.01023°N 2.47940°W	—	Late 16th or 17th century	Originally a farmhouse, the house is timber-framed with rendered infill and a tiled roof. All the windows date from the 20th century.	II
Park House; 53.02808°N 2.47374°W	—	17th century	A farmhouse that was extended in the 19th century. It is in brick on a stone plinth and a tiled roof. It is in two storeys, and has a symmetrical three-bay front. The central bay projects slightly forward, and is pedimented. In front of it is a projecting Tuscan porch. The windows are a mix of sashes and casements.	II
Bank House; 53.02071°N 2.47618°W		Late 17th or 18th century	A brick house with stone dressings and a tiled roof. It is in two storeys with a slightly projecting basement and an attic. The windows are casements.	II
Hatherton Manor; 53.01830°N 2.47828°W	—	1703	A brick farmhouse with stone dressings and a tiled roof. It is in two storeys with an attic and a basement, and has a symmetrical five-bay front. The doorway in the ground floor is approached by nine stone steps. The windows are sashes.	II*
Hatherton House; 53.03166°N 2.48281°W	—	Late 18th to early 19th century	A brick house with stone dressings and a slate roof. It is in three storeys and has a symmetrical three-bay entrance front. Most of the windows are sashes, some with wedge lintels. Other features include a doorway with a fanlight, a bay window, French windows, and a verandah.	II
Birchall Old Bridge; 53.01036°N 2.48411°W	—	Early 19th century	This is a disused road bridge over the Birchall Brook. It is in brick with stone dressings, and consists of a single span with a round-headed arch. There are curving retaining walls on both side, ending in square piers.	II
Hatherton Lodge; 53.02407°N 2.45696°W	—	Early 19th century	A rendered house with a slate roof. It is in two storeys and has a symmetrical entrance front of three bays. The central bay is bowed and contains a Tuscan porch, above which is a stone with a coat of arms. The windows are casements.	II
The Broomlands; 53.01577°N 2.47562°W	—	Mid-19th century	A former country house later divided into three dwellings. It is in rendered brick with a slate roof. The house is in two storeys and has a complex plan. The garden front is symmetrical with five bays. The entrance front has a Doric colonnade porch. There are French windows, and the other windows are casements.	II

== See also ==
- Listed buildings in Austerson
- Listed buildings in Batherton
- Listed buildings in Doddington
- Listed buildings in Hankelow
- Listed buildings in Hunsterson
- Listed buildings in Stapeley
- Listed buildings in Walgherton
