= Thomas Delves =

Thomas Delves may refer to:

- Sir Thomas Delves, 1st Baronet (1571–1658) High Sheriff of Cheshire, of the Delves Baronets
- Sir Thomas Delves, 3rd Baronet (1630–1713) High Sheriff of Cheshire, of the Delves Baronets
- Sir Thomas Delves, 4th Baronet (1652–1727), of the Delves Baronets

== See also ==
- Delves (disambiguation)
