= Lapidge =

Lapidge is a surname. Notable people with the surname include:

- Edward Lapidge (1779–1860), British architect
- Michael Lapidge (born 1942), British scholar in the field of Medieval Latin literature
