= Listed buildings in Checkley cum Wrinehill =

Checkley cum Wrinehill is a former civil parish in Cheshire East, England. It contained three buildings that are recorded in the National Heritage List for England as designated listed buildings. Of these, one is listed at Grade II*, the middle grade, and the other two are at Grade II. The parish was entirely rural, and the listed buildings consist of a country house, its gate piers, and a cottage.

== Key ==
Grade	Criteria
II*	Particularly important buildings of more than special interest
II	Buildings of national importance and special interest

== Buildings ==
Name and location	Photograph	Date	Notes	Grade
Hallgates Cottage; 53.01260°N 2.39890°W		16th to early 17th century	A long low cottage partly timber-framed with brick infill, and partly in brick, with a thatched roof. It is in a single storey with an attic, and has a four-(architecture)|bay]] front. The windows are casements, and in the upper storey are gabled dormers.	II
Checkley Hall; 53.01232°N 2.40007°W		1694	A small country house, replacing an earlier house, and later altered. It is in brick and has a tiled roof. The house has a double-pile plan, is in 2½ storeys, and has a symmetrical five-bay front. The windows are a mix of sashes and casements. Five steps lead up to the central doorway.	II*
Gate piers, Checkley Hall; 53.01240°N 2.39929°W	—	Late 17th to early 18th century	The gate piers are constructed in rusticated blocks of yellow ashlar sandstone. They have a square plan, are about 12 feet (3.7 m) high, and are surmounted by ball finials.	II

== See also ==
- Listed buildings in Blakenhall
- Listed buildings in Doddington
- Listed buildings in Betley, Staffordshire
- Listed buildings in Woore, Shropshire
- Listed buildings in Madeley, Staffordshire
