= Checkley Hall =

Country house in Cheshire, England

Coordinates: 53.01232°N 2.40007°W

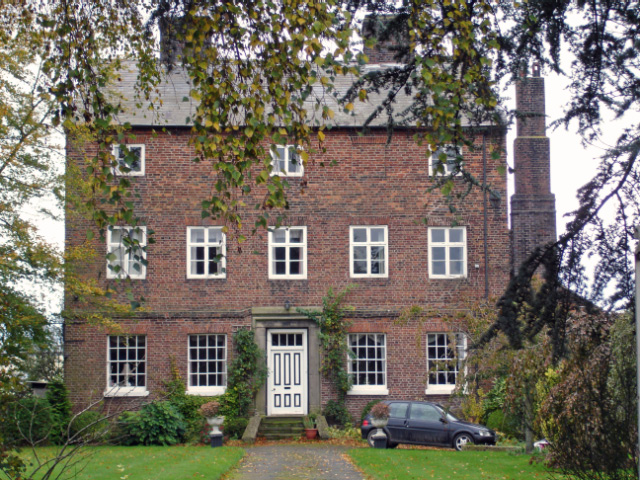
Checkley Hall

Checkley Hall is a small country house in the parish of Doddington and District (until 2023 Checkley cum Wrinehill), in Cheshire, England. The house was built in 1694 by the Delves family of Doddington, replacing an earlier timber-framed house. It was altered in the late 18th or early 19th century, replacing a hipped roof with an attic. The house is constructed in brick with a tiled roof. It has 2½ storeys, and an entrance front with five bays. The house is recorded in the National Heritage List for England as a designated Grade II* listed building. Its gate piers are listed at Grade II.

== See also ==
- Grade II* listed buildings in Cheshire East
- Listed buildings in Checkley cum Wrinehill
