= Delves (disambiguation) =

Delves is a village in County Durham, England.

Delves may also refer to:

- Delves baronets, a former baronetcy of England
- Delves Hall, Doddington, Cheshire, England
- Delves Lane, a village in County Durham, England
- The Delves, a neighbourhood in Walsall, West Midlands, England
- Cedric Delves (1947), retired British Army officer
- Thomas Delves (disambiguation)
