= Connor Naismith =

British politician

Connor Naismith MP
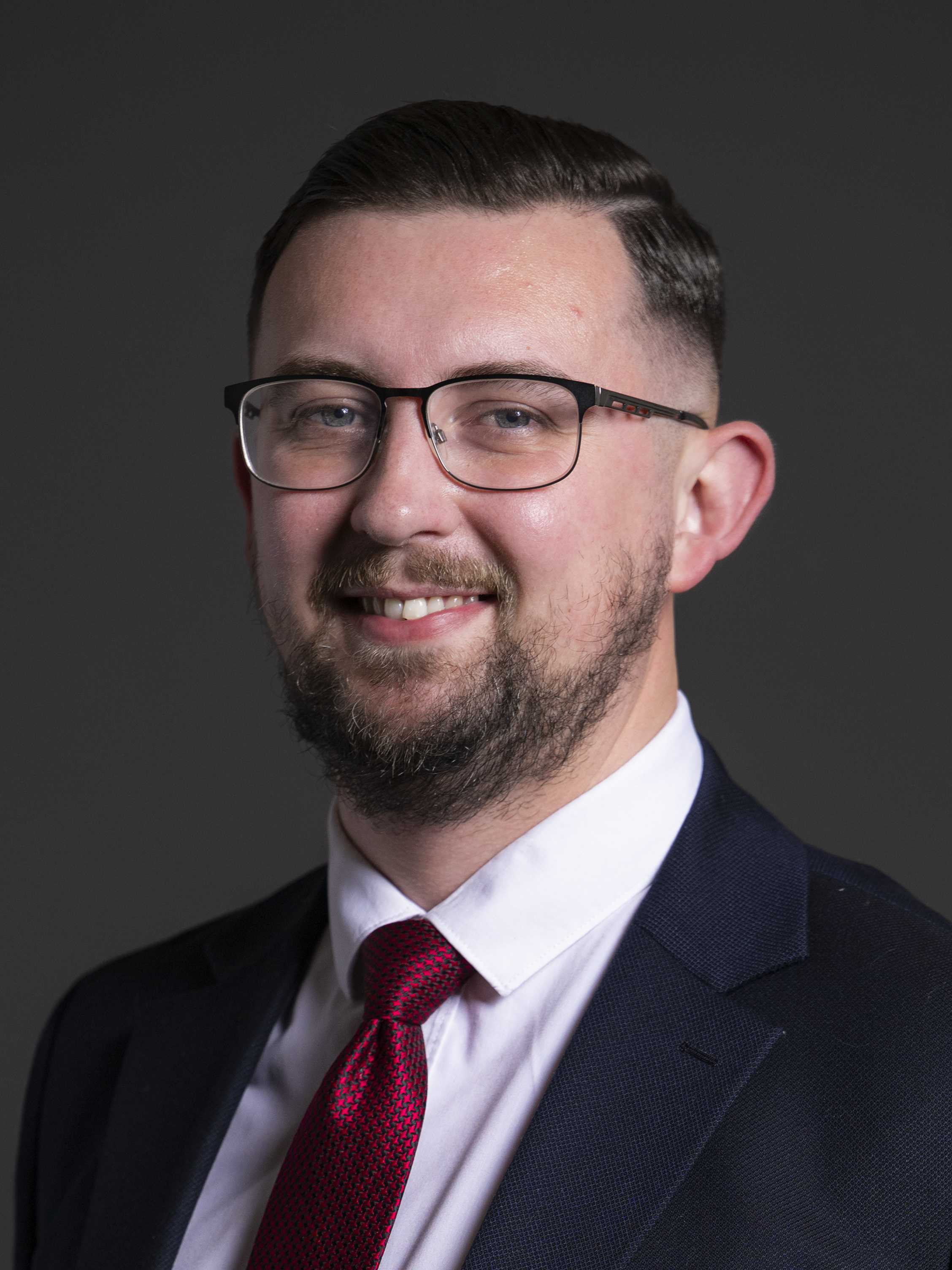
- Official portrait, 2025

Member of Parliament for Crewe and Nantwich
- Incumbent
- Assumed office 4 July 2024
- Preceded by: Kieran Mullan
- Majority: 9,727 (20.6%)

Personal details
- Born: Connor James Naismith; 25 April 1992 (age 34) Nuneaton
- Party: Labour
- Education: University of Manchester

Connor James Naismith is a British Labour Party politician who has been Member of Parliament for Crewe and Nantwich since 2024.

He identifies as belonging to the more socially conservative Blue Labour faction of the Parliamentary Party.

== Career ==
Prior to his election to Parliament, Naismith was a member of Cheshire East Council, representing the Crewe West ward, first being elected in May 2021 and re-elected in 2023. He graduated from Manchester with a BSocSc in Sociology in 2014.

Naismith worked as an oversight officer for the Independent Office for Police Conduct.

== Parliamentary career ==
In July 2024, Naismith voted against an amendment to abolish the two-child benefit cap. In September 2025, he called for it to be scrapped.

Naismith has also campaigned for the reinstatement of the Northern Leg of HS2 and for investment in Crewe Station through a "station investment zone" model.

In July 2026, Naismith was appointed as a Parliamentary Private Secretary (PPS) in the Department for Transport.

Parliament of the United Kingdom
Preceded by Kieran Mullan	Member of Parliament for Crewe and Nantwich; 2024–present	Incumbent
