= St John's Church, Doddington =

Coordinates: 53.0131°N 2.4443°W

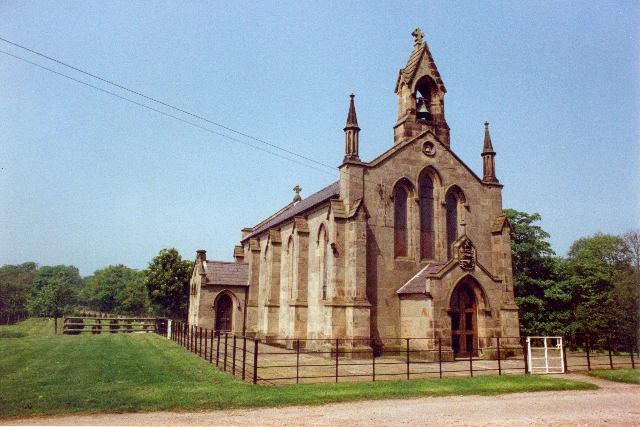
- St John's Church, Doddington, from the northwest

- Location in Cheshire
- OS grid reference: SJ 703 463
- Location: Doddington Hall, Cheshire
- Country: England
- Denomination: Anglican
- Website: St John, Doddington

History
- Status: Parish church
- Dedication: Saint John the Evangelist

Architecture
- Functional status: Active
- Heritage designation: Grade II
- Designated: 12 January 1967
- Architect: Edward Lapidge
- Architectural type: Church
- Style: Gothic Revival
- Completed: 1837

Specifications
- Materials: Sandstone, slate roof

Administration
- Province: York
- Diocese: Chester
- Archdeaconry: Macclesfield
- Deanery: Nantwich
- Parish: Doddington, St John

Clergy
- Rector: Revd Alison Fulford

St John's Church, Doddington, is located off Hunsterson Road in the grounds of Doddington Hall, Cheshire, England. It is an active Anglican parish church in the deanery of Nantwich, the archdeaconry of Macclesfield, and the diocese of Chester. Its benefice is combined with those of St James, Audlem, and St Chad, Wybunbury. The church is recorded in the National Heritage List for England as a designated Grade II listed building.

== History ==
St John's was built in 1837, and paid for by the Delves Broughton family of Doddington Hall. The architect was Edward Lapidge.

== Architecture ==
The church is constructed in yellow ashlar sandstone, and has a slate roof. Its plan consists of a single cell, with no differentiation between nave and chancel, a northeast vestry and a west porch. The porch is gabled, and the apex of the gable contains a datestone with the arms of the Delves Broughton family. Beyond and above the porch is a triple stepped lancet window, and over the window is a roundel containing a carved dog's head. At the corners are angle buttresses, which rise to form octagonal pinnacles surmounted by spires. On the top of the gable is a bellcote. Along the sides of the church are lancet windows between buttresses. The vestry has a double lancet window. The east end also has a triple lancet window, and a cross finial on its gable. The authors of the Buildings of England series describe the west front as being "gauche".

== See also ==
- Listed buildings in Hunsterson
