= Broughton baronets =

Title in the Baronetage of England

Escutcheon of the Broughton baronets of Broughton

The Broughton, later Broughton-Delves, later Broughton Baronetcy, of Broughton in the County of Stafford, is a title in the Baronetage of England. It was created on 10 March 1661 for Sir Brian Broughton, of Broughton Hall, near Eccleshall, Staffordshire, High Sheriff of Staffordshire from 1660 to 1661 and the member of an ancient Staffordshire family.

== History ==
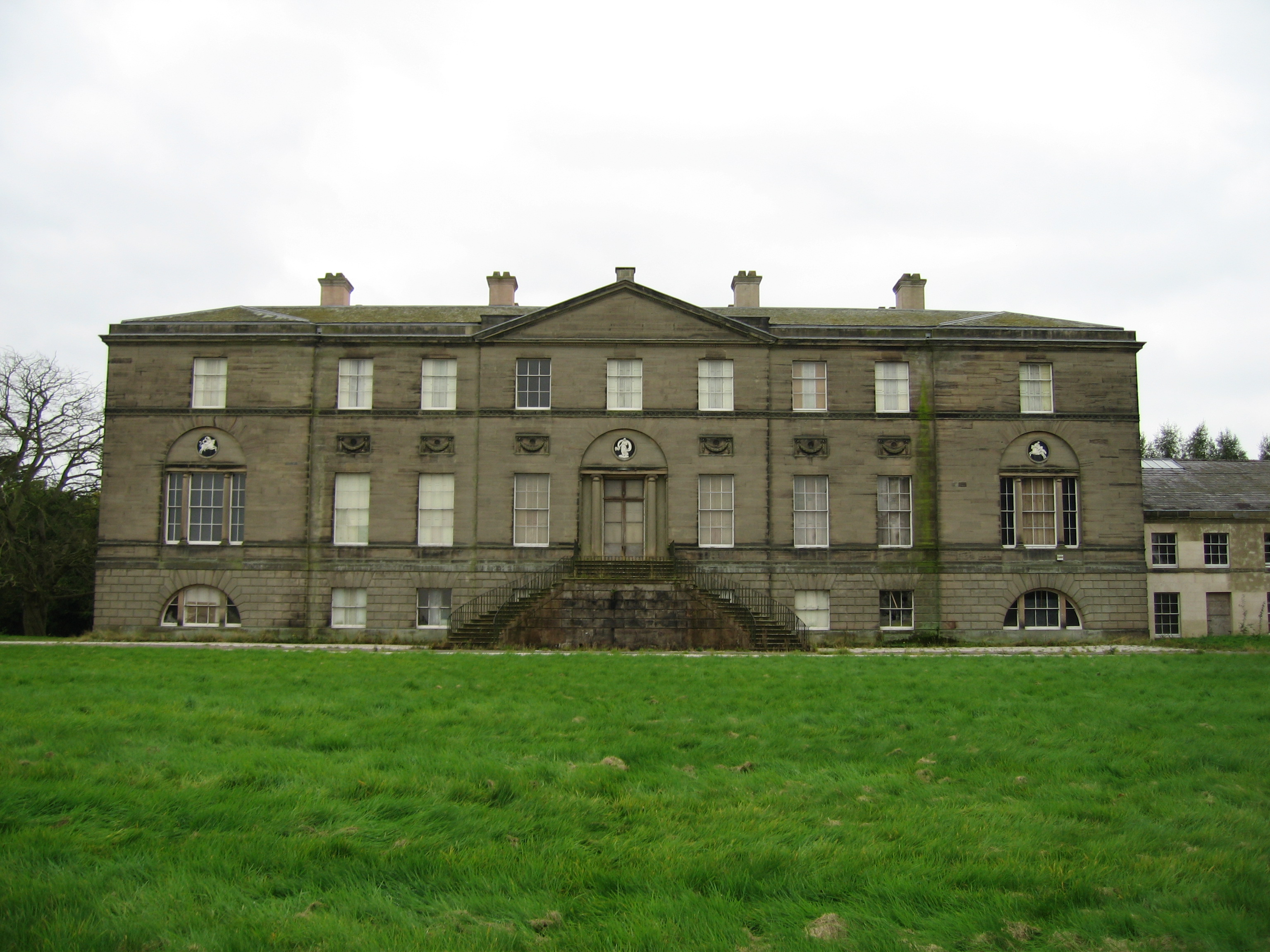
Doddington Hall

The Broughtons are descended from the ancient Vernon family and in particular from Richard Vernon, fourth son of the 3rd medieval Baron Vernon of Shipbrook, Cheshire. Adam, his son, was of Napton, Warwickshire. Adams's grandson Roger acquired the estate at Broughton, Staffordshire, from which the surname derives, in the 13th century. The first Baronet was the son of Thomas Broughton (died 1648) who was an ardent Royalist and supporter of Charles I and who was obliged to compound at a cost of £3200, for the return of his estates following sequestration by the Parliament at the conclusion of the Civil War. His son was honoured with the baronetcy at the Restoration of Charles II.

The baronetcy was dormant between 1993 and 2022. In 2022, Geoffrey Delves Broughton proved his right of succession. He is the great-great-grandson of Reverend Sir Thomas Delves Broughton, second son of the eighth Baronet.

The family seat is Doddington Hall, near Nantwich, Cheshire. It remains in the family of Sir Evelyn Delves Broughton, 12th Baronet. In the past, the family also owned Broughton Hall, Staffordshire, but this property was sold to John Hall in 1914.

== Broughton baronets, of Broughton (1660) ==
- Sir Brian Broughton, 1st Baronet (1618–1708)
- Sir Thomas Broughton, 2nd Baronet (died 1710)
- Sir Brian Broughton, 3rd Baronet (died 1724). Sir Brian Broughton's grandson, also named Brian, the third Baronet, was a Member of Parliament for Newcastle-under-Lyme. He married Elizabeth, daughter and sole heiress of Sir Thomas Delves, 4th Baronet, of Doddington (see Delves baronets).
- Sir Brian Broughton-Delves, 4th Baronet (1717–1744). The fourth Baronet, succeeded to the Doddington Park estate in Cheshire through his mother and assumed the additional surname of Delves according to the will of his maternal grandfather. He represented Wenlock in the House of Commons.
- Sir Brian Broughton-Delves, 5th Baronet (1740–1766). The fifth Baronet, died childless at an early age and was succeeded by his younger brother

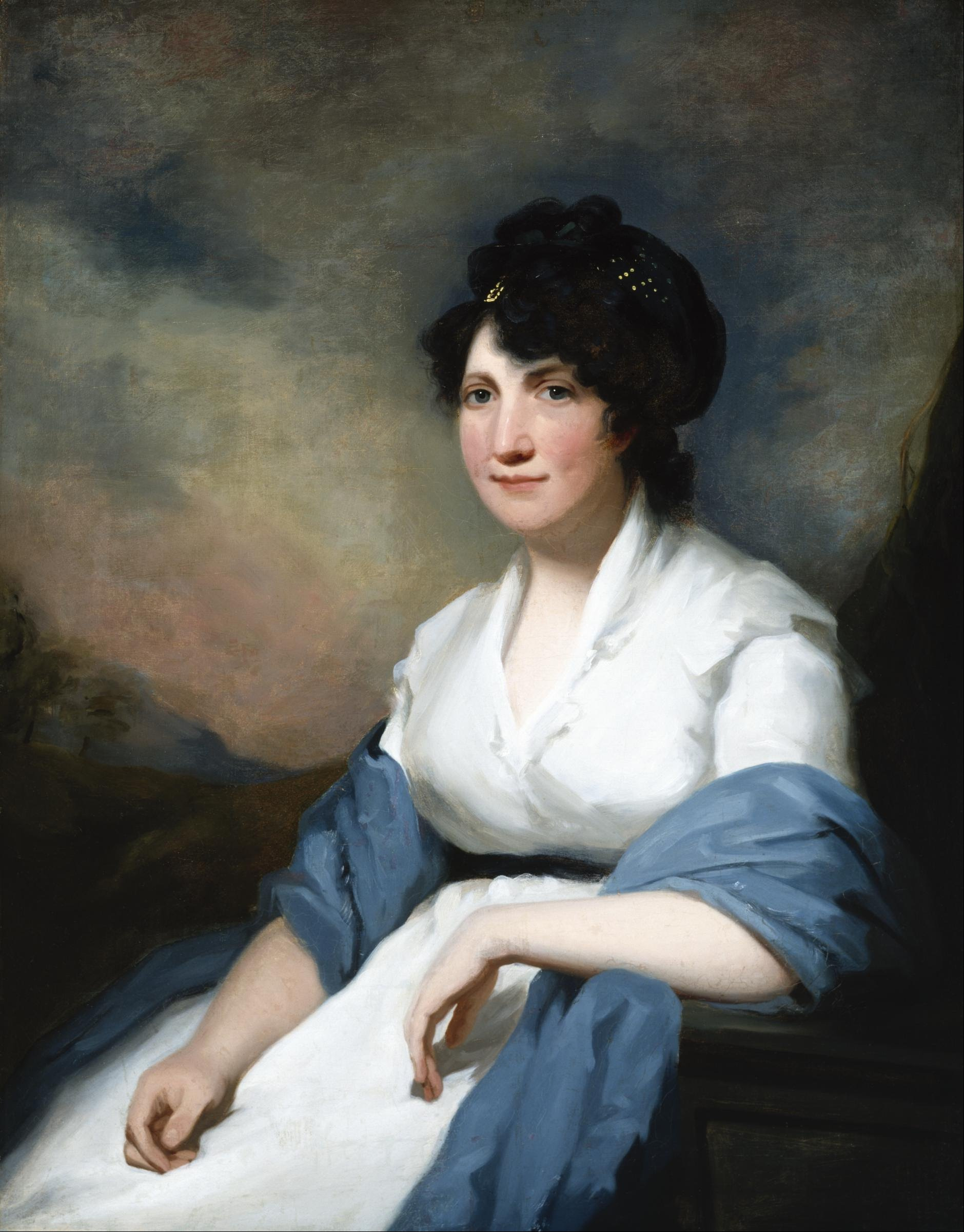
Portrait of Elizabeth, wife of Sir John Delves Broughton, by Henry Raeburn

- Sir Thomas Broughton, 6th Baronet (April 1745 – 23 July 1813). Broughton was the second son of Sir Brian Broughton-Delves, 4th Baronet, and his wife Mary (née Forrester), and was educated at Magdalen College, Oxford. In 1766 he succeeded in the baronetcy on the death of his childless elder brother and the same year he reverted to the surname of Broughton only in lieu of Broughton-Delves, by a private act of Parliament, Delves' Name Act 1766 (7 Geo. 3. c. 16 Pr.). Broughton was High Sheriff of Staffordshire in 1772 and Rector of Cheadle, Cheshire, between 1795 and 1807. He married firstly Mary, daughter of John Wicker, in 1766. They had several children, incl Maria who married Thomas Langford Brooke of Mere. After her death in 1785 he married secondly Lady Anne, daughter of Other Lewis Windsor, 4th Earl of Plymouth, in 1787. There were no children from this marriage. After her death in 1793 he married thirdly Mary, daughter of Michael Keating and widow of Thomas Scott Jackson, in 1794. This marriage was also childless. Broughton died in July 1813, and was succeeded in the baronetcy by his eldest son from his first marriage, John. Lady Broughton died in November 1813.
- Sir John Delves Broughton, 7th Baronet (17 August 1769 – 9 August 1847). Sir John was the eldest son of Sir Thomas Broughton, 6th Baronet, by his first wife Mary (née Wicker). He served in the British Army and achieved the rank of General in 1830. He married Elizabeth, daughter of Philip Egerton, in 1792. They had no children. Broughton died in August 1847, aged 77, and was succeeded in the baronetcy by his younger brother, Henry. Lady Broughton died in January 1857.
- Sir Henry Delves Broughton, 8th Baronet (10 January 1777 – 3 November 1851). Sir Henry was a younger son of Sir Thomas Broughton, 6th Baronet, by his first wife Mary (née Wicker), and was educated at Rugby, Eton, Oriel College, Oxford, and Jesus College, Cambridge. From 1807 to 1829 he was Rector of Cheadle, Staffordshire. In 1847, at the age of 70, he succeeded his elder brother in the baronetcy. Sir Henry married Mary, daughter of John Pigott, in 1807. They had nine sons and nine daughters. He died in November 1851, aged 74, and was succeeded in the baronetcy by his eldest son, Henry. Lady Delves Broughton died in December 1863.
- Sir Henry Delves Broughton, 9th Baronet (1808–1899). High Sheriff of Staffordshire in 1859.
- Sir Delves Louis Broughton, 10th Baronet (1857–1914)
- Sir Henry John Delves Broughton, 11th Baronet (1883–1942)
- Sir Evelyn Delves Broughton, 12th Baronet (2 October 1915 – 5 January 1993). He was educated at Eton College and Trinity College, Cambridge. 2nd Lt, Irish Guards, Major Royal Army Service Corps. He inherited his baronetcy from his father, 'Jock' Delves Broughton, in 1942. In 1947, he married, firstly Hon. Elizabeth Florence Marion Cholmondeley, elder daughter of the 4th Baron Delamere. In 1955, he married Helen Mary Shore, with whom he had four children, including Isabella Blow, to each of whom he left only £5,000 of his estate, having already provided for them. In 1964 his only son, John, died aged two by drowning in an ornamental pool. Following separation from his second wife in 1972, in 1974 he married his third wife, Rona Cramond (née Clifford Johns). As he left no surviving son, his distant cousin Geoffrey Delves Broughton inherited the title after proving his right of succession 29 years later.
- Sir David Delves Broughton, 13th Baronet (1942 – 13 May 2021)
- Sir Geoffrey Delves Broughton, 14th Baronet (born 7 August 1962)

The heir apparent is the present baronet's elder son Peter Thomas Delves Broughton (born 1991).

== See also ==
- Delves baronets
