= Delves Hall =

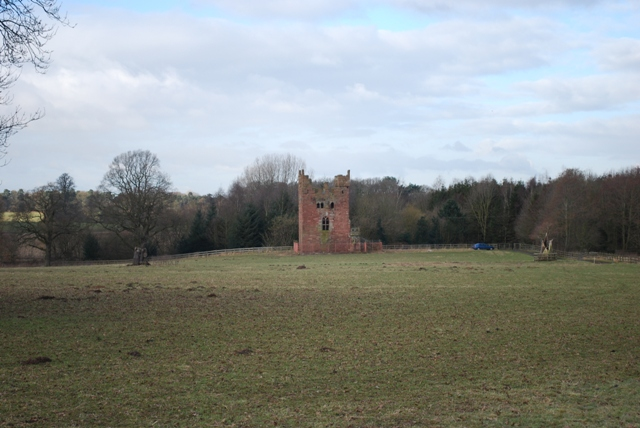
- Delves Hall

- Location in Cheshire
- 53.0197°N 2.4356°W
- OS grid reference: SJ 708 470

History
- Built: 1364
- Built for: Sir John Delves

Listed Building – Grade I
- Designated: 12 January 1967
- Reference no.: 1330165

Delves Hall, also known as Doddington Castle, is a fortified structure in Doddington Park to the north of Doddington Hall in the civil parish of Doddington, Cheshire, England. It is designated by Historic England as a Grade I listed building.

== History ==
This fortified tower was built by Sir John Delves in 1364, on the site of a former moated manor house. The tower was initially free-standing and was probably intended as a place of refuge for the family. In the 17th century it was incorporated into a range of domestic buildings known as Doddington Hall. In the Civil War the hall became a garrison for the parliamentary forces. It was taken for the king by Lord Byron in January 1644 but retaken shortly after. In 1727 the house and estate passed to the Broughton family. The house was demolished around 1777 and replaced by the new Doddington Hall, leaving the tower as a landscape feature which was possibly used as a gazebo or a banqueting pavilion. The external staircase to the former house was retained when the house was demolished and it was attached to the tower.

== Architecture ==
The tower is built in red sandstone ashlar with a slate roof on a square plan in three storeys with corner turrets. The entrance front is approached by an external ashlar Jacobean imperial staircase. Its central lower flight leads to a half-landing on which is a crude Ionic column supporting a naked female figure. The undercroft to the lateral flights of stairs has rusticated pilasters on each side of which are large statues representing the Black Prince, Audley and his four squires, who are all dressed in armour. The parapet of the tower and the turrets are battlemented.

== See also ==
- Grade I listed buildings in Cheshire
- Listed buildings in Doddington, Cheshire
- List of castles in Cheshire
- Castles in Great Britain and Ireland
- List of castles in England
