= Listed buildings in Austerson =

Austerson is a civil parish in Cheshire East, England. It contains three buildings that are recorded in the National Heritage List for England as designated listed buildings. all of which are at Grade II. This grade is the lowest of the three gradings given to listed buildings and is applied to "buildings of national importance and special interest". The parish is entirely rural, and the listed buildings are all related to farming.

Name and location	Photograph	Date	Notes
Barn, Austerson Old Hall; 53.04050°N 2.51423°W	—	Late 16th century	The hall has been removed to another site, but the timber-framed barn remains. It is partly brick nogged, and partly weatherboarded, and stands on a sandstone plinth. The barn has a corrugated metal roof. It has a seven-bay front, and is in a single storey with a loft.
Austerson Hall; 53.04072°N 2.51512°W	—	17th century	A farmhouse in roughcast brick with a tiled roof. It has a T-shaped plan, is in two storeys with an attic, and has a front of four bays. There is a lean-to extension to the south. The windows on the front are casements, and those on the back are sashes.
Church House Farmhouse; 53.05065°N 2.52273°W		Early 19th century	The farmhouse is built in brick on a projecting plinth, and has a slated roof, A wing to the rear gives it an L-shaped plan, it is in two storeys with an attic, and has a three-bay front. The windows are three-light casements.
