= Listed buildings in Walgherton =

Walgherton is a civil parish in Cheshire East, England. It contains three buildings that are recorded in the National Heritage List for England as designated listed buildings, all of which are listed at Grade II. This grade is the lowest of the three gradings given to listed buildings and is applied to "buildings of national importance and special interest". The parish is rural, and the listed buildings consist of two timber-framed houses and a pair of former lodges to a country house.

Name and location	Photograph	Date	Notes
The Cottage; 53.03689°N 2.45158°W	—	17th century	A house that is partly timber-framed with rendered infill, and partly in brick painted to resemble timber-framing. It has a shingled roof, and is in two storeys. In the ground floor are a French window; the other windows are casements, those in the upper storey being in gabled dormers. To the right is a 20th-century extension.
Thatchers; 53.03828°N 2.45491°W		17th century	A house that was altered in the 19th and 20th centuries. It is partly timber-framed, and partly in brick painted to resemble timber-framing, and has a thatched roof. The house is in two storeys, and has a three-bay front with a lean-to porch to the left of centre. The windows are casements, those in the upper storey being in gabled dormers. Inside the house is an inglenook.
Lodges, gates and gate piers 53.03669°N 2.45221°W		c. 1771–90	A pair of lodges with gates and gate piers at the northern entrance to Doddington Hall, designed by Samuel Wyatt. The lodges are in sandstone with pyramidal tile roofs, each has a square plan, is in a single storey, and contains sash windows. Between the lodges and the gate piers are wicket gates, and between the piers are double gates. The piers are rusticated and have pyramidal caps.
