= Edward Lapidge =

English architect

Edward Lapidge (1779–1860) was an English architect, who held the post of county surveyor of Surrey and designed Kingston Bridge.

== Life and career ==
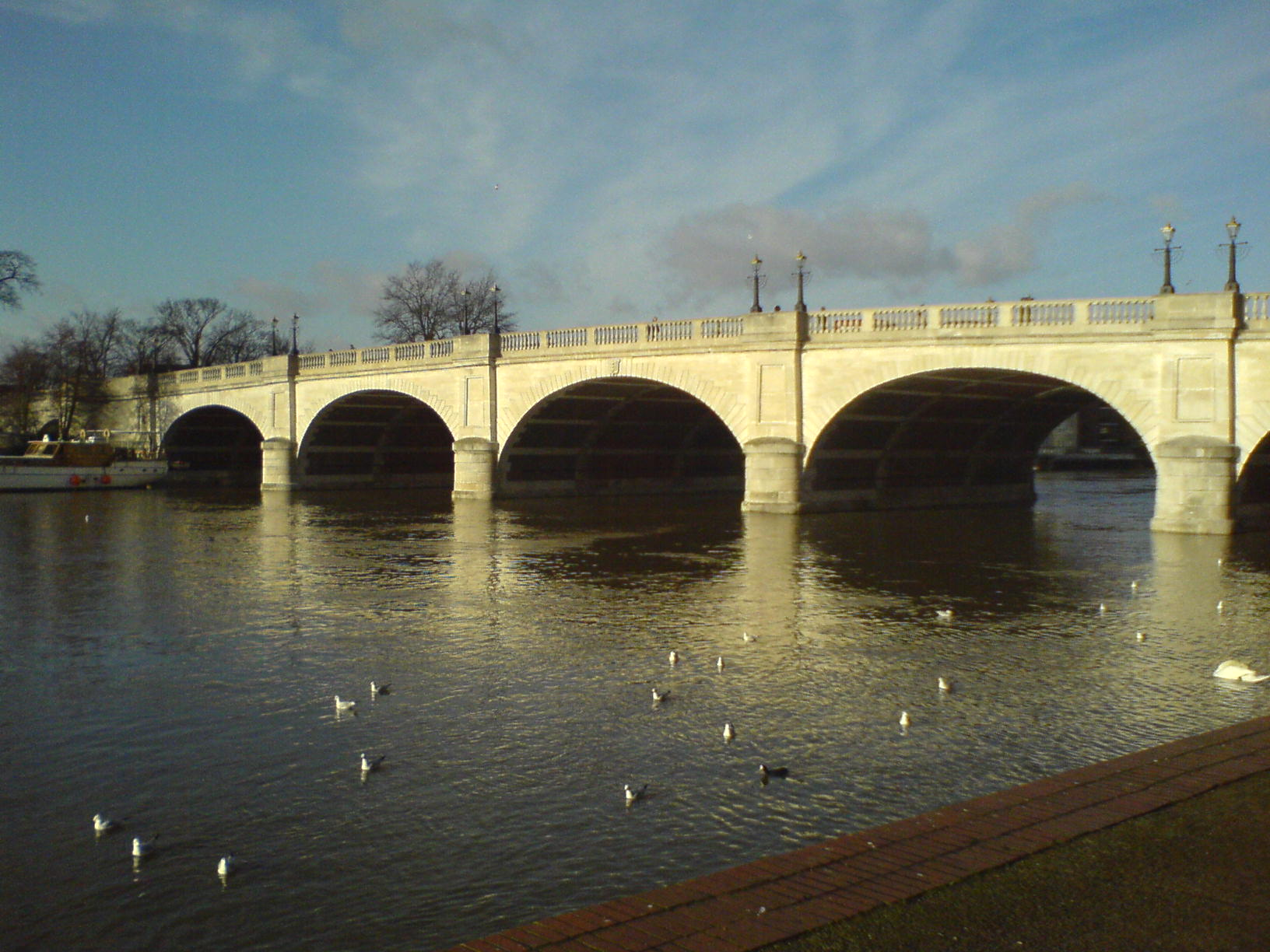
Kingston Bridge, completed 1828.

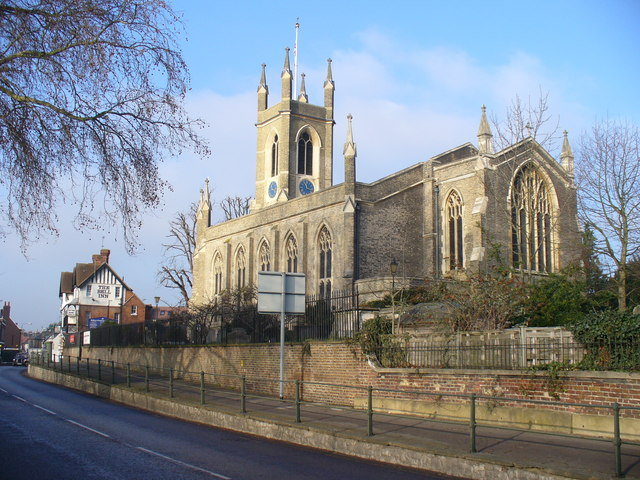
St Mary's, Hampton (1829–31).

Edward Lapidge was the eldest son of Samuel Lapidge, the head gardener at Hampton Court Palace and one-time assistant of Capability Brown. The Lapidge family lived in a house called The Grove, which still exists, in Lower Teddington Road.

In Surrey Lapidge built Esher Place, a brick house, stuccoed in imitation of stone, with an Ionic portico on each side, for John Spicer. He showed a view of the garden front of the house at the Royal Academy in 1808. At Norbiton Place he carried out considerable additions and alterations for its owner, Charles Nicholas Pallmer, including a dairy in the style of an Indian temple.

In 1807 he built Hildersham Hall in Cambridgeshire for Thomas Fassett (formerly of Surbiton Hall, Surrey). He showed a drawing for the house, a stuccoed villa incorporating a former farmhouse in one wing, at the Royal Academy in 1814. In 1811 he was engaged by the Rev. John Kirby of Mayfield, Sussex, to rebuild the vicarage there.

Lapidge was appointed surveyor to the County of Surrey in 1824. The next year he was given the job of replacing the bridge at Kingston upon Thames, after the Kingston corporation dropped its plan to build a cast iron structure due to a rise in cost of the metal. Lapidge designed a five-arched stone bridge in a Classical style, which was opened in 1828.

He designed a number of churches: St John, Hampton Wick (1829–30), St Mary, Hampton (1829–31), and St Andrew's Church, Ham (1830–31) all of brick, in the Gothic style, and St Peter's, Hammersmith in a Greek Ionic style, in brick finished with Bath stone dressings. The Gentleman's Magazine described St Peter's as "a very fair specimen of modern Grecian architecture", adding that "the tower has considerable merit. The design is novel and pleasing, and the proportions are harmonious. The interior is however chaste and formal, displaying even a presbyterian nakedness". Lapidge himself donated the site of the church at Hampton Wick. As well as these buildings on the west side of London he built St James, Ratcliffe (1837–38), in the East End, in the Early English style, in brick with stone dressings. Further afield he built the church of St John in the park of Doddington Hall, Cheshire (1837).

He entered designs for the competitions for a new range of buildings for King's College, Cambridge in 1824, in which he came third; for the new Houses of Parliament in 1836; and for the Fitzwilliam Museum at Cambridge in 1837, proposing a domed building, ornamented with sculpture. In 1830, he was invited by the Vice-Chancellor of Cambridge University, William Chafy, to design a new botanic garden for the university. The expense of acquiring the necessary land caused the plan to be shelved, and Lapidge waited for more than ten years for his bill to be paid. The gardens were eventually laid out in the mid-1840s, but not under his supervision.

In 1836–37 he made considerable alterations to St. Mary's Church, Putney, repairing the tower and rebuilding the body of the church in yellow brick with stone dressings and Perpendicular windows, and in 1839–40 restored All Saints' Church at Fulham.

In around 1838-41 he oversaw the construction of the Surrey County Lunatic Asylum (now Springfield Hospital), a grand Tudor-style composition designed by William Moseley (then County Architect for Middlesex) making minor changes to the original design.

Lapidge was elected a fellow of the Royal Institute of British Architects in 1838.

== Pupils ==
George Wightwick, articled to Lapidge in 1817, later became a leading architect in Plymouth. In 1846 Lapidge paid for the patenting of a new type of suspension bridge, invented by another pupil, Henry Heathcote Russell.

== Death ==
He died on 19 February 1860 at Hampton Wick. He is buried at St Mary's Parish Church, Hampton.

== Sources ==
- Cust, Lionel Henry (1892). "Lapidge, Edward" . In Lee, Sidney (ed.). Dictionary of National Biography. Vol. 32. London: Smith, Elder & Co.
