= Delves baronets =

Extinct baronetcy in the Baronetage of England

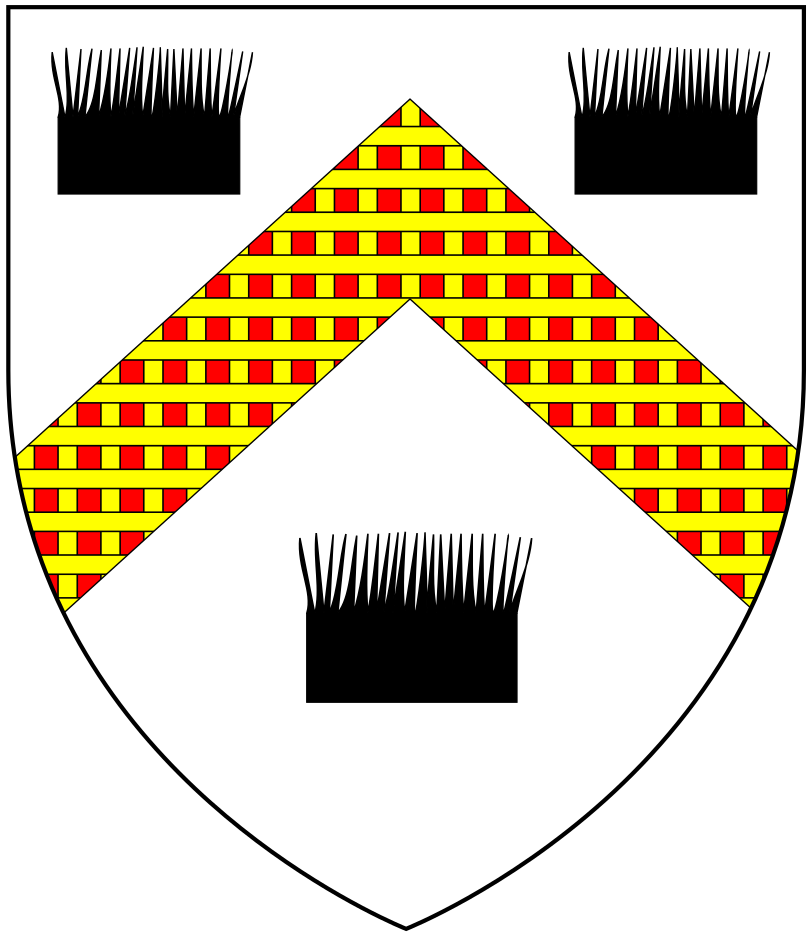
- Escutcheon of the Delves baronets of Dodington
- Creation date: 1621
- Status: dormant
- Extinction date: 1727
- Arms: Argent, a Chevron Gules, fretty Or, between three Delves Sable
- Crest: Out of a Ducal Coronet Or, a Demi-Heron wings displayed Argent

The Delves baronetcy of Dodington in Cheshire was created in the Baronetage of England on 8 May 1621 for Thomas Delves. He was the great-grandson of Sir Henry Delves Kt of Dodington, High Sheriff of Cheshire on two occasions. The first three Baronets also served as High Sheriffs of Cheshire.

The title became extinct on the death of the 4th Baronet. His daughter and heiress Elizabeth Delves married Sir Brian Broughton, 3rd Baronet in 1710.

== Background ==
The Delves family originated in Staffordshire and the Baronets were descended from Sir John Delves, Knight of the Shire for Staffordshire and three times High Sheriff of Staffordshire, and Sir John Delves, twice High Sheriff who was killed during the Wars of the Roses at the Battle of Tewkesbury in 1471.

== Delves baronets of Dodington, Cheshire (1621) ==
Created in the Baronetage of England

- Sir Thomas Delves, 1st Baronet (30 November 1571 – 23 April 1658) High Sheriff of Cheshire
- Sir Henry Delves, 2nd Baronet (24 May 1597 – 23 May 1663)
- Sir Thomas Delves, 3rd Baronet (28 August 1630 – 15 May 1713)
- Sir Thomas Delves, 4th Baronet (4 October 1652 – 12 September 1727)

The Baronetcy became extinct on the death of the 4th Baronet.
