= Doddington Hall, Cheshire =

Doddington Hall
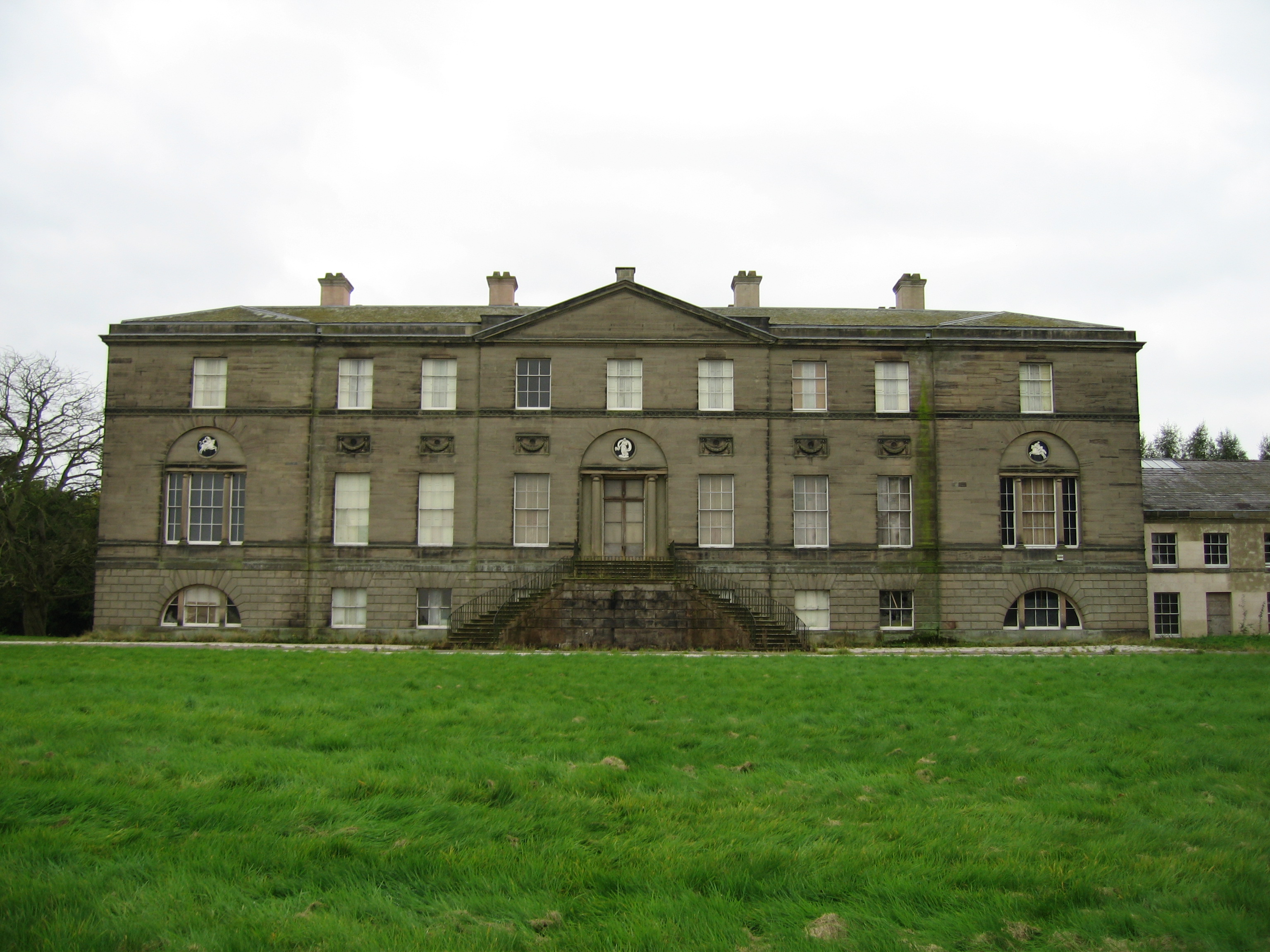
- Doddington Hall

- Location in Cheshire
- 53.0148°N 2.4342°W
- Location: Doddington Park, Doddington, Cheshire, England
- OS grid reference: SJ 709 464

History
- Built: 1777–98
- Built for: Rev Sir Thomas Broughton

Site notes
- Architectural style: Neoclassical

Listed Building – Grade I
- Designated: 10 June 1952
- Reference no.: 1136840

Doddington Hall is a country house in Doddington Park in the civil parish of Doddington and District, in Cheshire, England. It is recorded in the National Heritage List for England as a designated Grade I listed building. The house was built for Rev Sir Thomas Broughton between 1777 and 1798 to a design by Samuel Wyatt. It was built to replace an older house, of which Delves Hall was a part, a short distance to the north. The house is constructed of Keuper sandstone ashlar with a slate roof and lead flashings in three storeys. It is in neoclassical style with an entrance front of nine bays.

It is the seat of the Broughton baronets.

== See also ==
- Jock Delves Broughton (born at Doddington Hall)
- Grade I listed buildings in Cheshire East
- Listed buildings in Doddington, Cheshire
