= Laura Smith (British politician) =

British Labour politician

Cllr Laura Smith
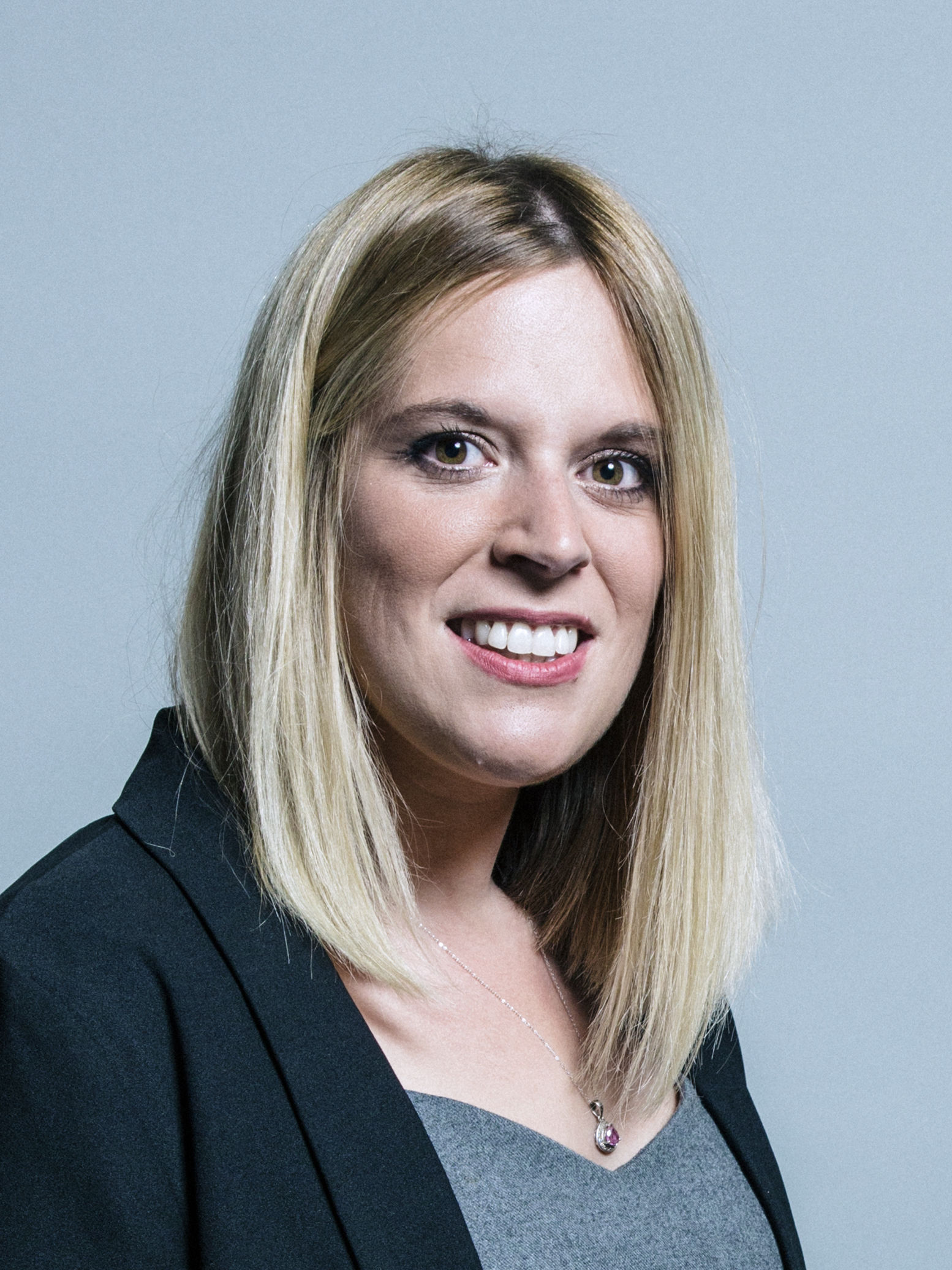
- Official portrait, 2017

Member of Cheshire East Council for Crewe South
- Incumbent
- Assumed office 27 February 2020
- Preceded by: Dorothy Flude
- Majority: 288 (18.1%)

Vice-Chair of Your Party
- Incumbent
- Assumed office 8 March 2026
- Preceded by: Office established

Shadow Minister for the Cabinet Office
- In office 12 January 2018 – 13 June 2018
- Leader: Jeremy Corbyn
- Preceded by: Position established
- Succeeded by: Jo Platt

Member of Parliament for Crewe and Nantwich
- In office 8 June 2017 – 6 November 2019
- Preceded by: Edward Timpson
- Succeeded by: Kieran Mullan

Personal details
- Born: 16 March 1985 (age 41)
- Party: Your Party (2025–present)
- Other political affiliations: Labour Party (until 2024); Independent (2024–2025)
- Children: 2
- Education: Manchester Metropolitan University

Laura Smith (born 16 March 1985) is a British politician who served as the Labour Member of Parliament (MP) for Crewe and Nantwich from 2017 to 2019. In 2017, she defeated the incumbent Conservative Edward Timpson by 48 votes, before losing her seat at the 2019 general election.

In February 2020, Smith was elected to Cheshire East Council for the Crewe South ward.

== Early life and career ==
Smith was raised in Crewe; her grandfather was a miner and trade unionist and her father was heavily involved with the Labour Party. She attended Brine Leas School in Nantwich, Cheshire and South Cheshire College in Crewe. She went on to study at Crewe campus of Manchester Metropolitan University, qualifying as a school teacher.

She was dissatisfied with work as a teacher and began a tutoring business.

== Political career ==
Smith was announced as the Labour Party candidate for the Crewe and Nantwich constituency in the snap 2017 general election on 1 May 2017. She launched her campaign on 3 May, saying "What ordinary people need are decent well-paid jobs and greater job security. In this race locally, I am the only candidate committed to that." She also said that she was not a "natural-born politician" and promised to be a "different sort of MP if elected that remains accessible and up front with her constituents". In the election, Smith defeated incumbent Conservative junior minister Edward Timpson by 48 votes, overturning a majority of 3,620. She declared that the result "sent a message to the establishment and the elite", the seat having been held by the Conservatives in elections since Gwyneth Dunwoody died in 2008. The seat saw a 3.7% swing to Labour, and an increase in turnout of 3%, to just under 70%.

On 13 June 2018, Smith and five other Labour MPs resigned their roles as frontbenchers for the Labour Party in protest at Labour's Brexit position. Leader Jeremy Corbyn had instructed his MPs to abstain in a vote which Britain would remain in the single market by joining the European Economic Area (EEA). Following her resignation Smith voted against the EEA. Smith also resigned her position as a Shadow Cabinet Office Minister. However, despite this stance, Smith abstained from a vote to delay the United Kingdom's withdrawal from the European Union for a time sufficient to enable a second referendum on leaving the EU to be held.

In September 2018 Smith called for a general strike to "topple" Theresa May's Conservative government. Deputy Labour Leader, Tom Watson, quickly distanced the Labour Party from Smith saying her comments were "not particularly helpful". Shadow business secretary Rebecca Long-Bailey added: "Just to make it perfectly clear a general strike is not Labour Party policy."

Smith lost her seat in the 2019 general election, to Kieran Mullan of the Conservative Party. The Labour vote was down 9.7% to 37.4% and the Conservative vote up 6.1% to 53.1% giving Kieran Mullan a majority of 8,508. In January 2020 Smith appeared on BBC Radio 5 Live to speak about her life since losing the election, and to dispel what she described as "the misconception... that people who are members of parliament – even local councillors – are kind of sitting on a bank of reserves or will automatically have connections who will come and want to hire you". The interview came after Smith was photographed at her local job centre.

On 27 February 2020, Smith was elected to Cheshire East Council for the Crewe South ward.

On 15 March 2024, Smith announced that she was leaving the Labour Party after she was suspended from the Cheshire East Labour Group for voting against what she described as an "austerity budget". She went on to serve as an independent socialist councillor.

On 26 February 2026, Smith was elected to the Central Executive Committee (CEC) of Your Party (UK) as one of the party's Public Office Holders group. She serves alongside Zarah Sultana and Jeremy Corbyn in this group.

== Political views ==
Smith identifies as a socialist and was part of the Socialist Campaign Group of Labour MPs during her time in parliament. She was a supporter of the Labour Against Private Schools campaign, which aims to abolish private schools in the United Kingdom.

Smith was involved in the campaign against school funding cuts in Cheshire East. She told the Crewe Chronicle: "I sat at home after going to a public meeting at Brine Leas School" about proposed education cuts "and I decided enough was enough regarding the funding for schools and I posted something on Facebook. From that, I got involved with the fairer funding".

== Personal life ==
Smith lives in Nantwich with her two children.

Parliament of the United Kingdom
Preceded by Edward Timpson	Member of Parliament for Crewe and Nantwich; 2017–2019	Succeeded by Kieran Mullan
