= Kieran Mullan =

British Conservative politician

Kieran Mullan MP
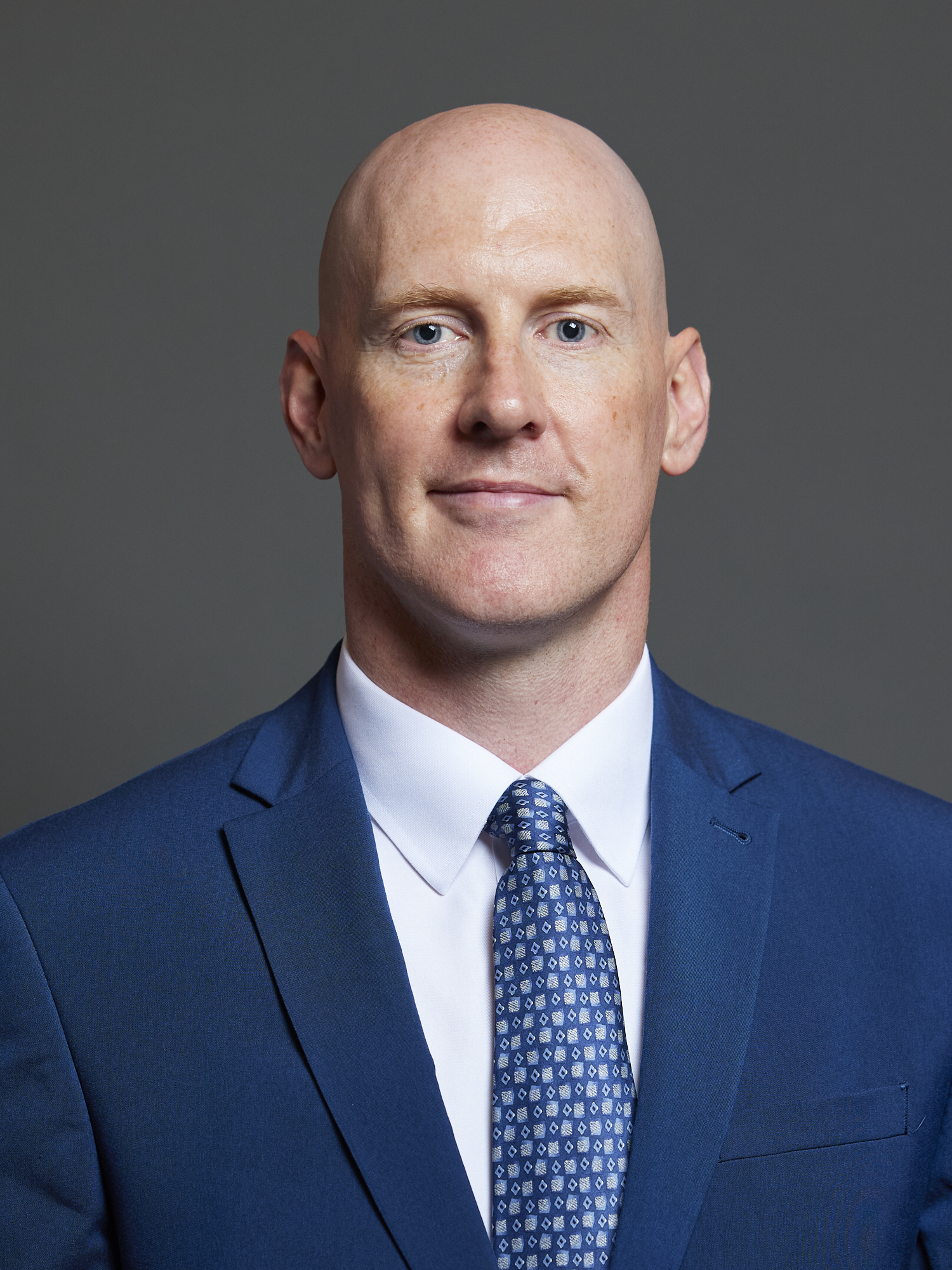
- Official portrait, 2024

Shadow Minister for Justice
- Incumbent
- Assumed office 5 November 2024
- Leader: Kemi Badenoch
- Preceded by: Gareth Bacon

Shadow Minister for Transport
- In office 19 July 2024 – 5 November 2024
- Leader: Rishi Sunak
- Preceded by: Simon Lightwood
- Succeeded by: Jerome Mayhew

Member of Parliament
- Incumbent
- Assumed office 12 December 2019
- Preceded by: Laura Smith
- Constituency: Crewe and Nantwich (2019–2024); Bexhill and Battle (2024–present)
- Majority: 2,657 (5.6%)

Personal details
- Born: Kieran John Mullan; 6 June 1984 (age 42) Birmingham, West Midlands, England
- Party: Conservative
- Education: University of Leeds (MBChB)
- Website: Official website

Kieran John Mullan (born 6 June 1984) is a British Conservative Party politician and medical doctor who is the Member of Parliament (MP) for Bexhill and Battle. He was previously the MP for Crewe and Nantwich between 2019 and 2024. He has been Shadow Minister for Justice since July 2024.

== Early life and career ==
Kieran Mullan was born on 6 June 1984 in Birmingham. He grew up in social housing, with his mother a nurse and his father a policeman. He attended King Edward VI Five Ways grammar school in Birmingham. Mullan then studied medicine at the Leeds School of Medicine.

In 2008, he was an account executive for the public relations firm Weber Shandwick. From 2009 to 2013, he worked for the advocacy group Patients Association. In 2013, he contributed to a government review into the NHS Hospitals complaints system. The following year, Mullan founded the charity ValueYou in Ealing, London which aimed to recognise volunteers. He has also worked as a volunteer special constable for four years and as an emergency medicine doctor.

== Parliamentary career ==
At the 2015 general election, Mullan stood as the Conservative candidate in Birmingham Hodge Hill, coming second with 11.5% of the vote behind the incumbent Labour MP Liam Byrne.

Mullan stood in Wolverhampton South East at the snap 2017 general election, coming second with 34.8% of the vote behind the incumbent Labour MP Pat McFadden.

Mullan was selected as the Conservative candidate for the marginal seat of Crewe and Nantwich in September 2018. At the 2019 general election, Mullan was elected to Parliament as MP for Crewe and Nantwich with 53.1% of the vote and a majority of 8,508. During his election victory speech he said he would "speak up for, and work for, staff" at the NHS and increase the number of GPs.

Mullan has been a member of the Justice Select Committee since March 2020. In 2020, while serving as an MP, he returned to his role as a doctor to volunteer during the COVID-19 pandemic.

Mullan has campaigned for funding to rebuild Leighton Hospital, including petitions and joint letters with fellow Cheshire MPs Edward Timpson and Fiona Bruce. In May 2023, Secretary of State for Health and Social Care Steve Barclay announced that the hospital would be included in the government's rebuilding programme as it was constructed using reinforced autoclaved aerated concrete so was unsafe to use beyond 2030.

Mullan made the final shortlist for selection as the Conservative candidate for the new seat of Chester South and Eddisbury as he was considered as an incumbent by CCHQ as part of Crewe and Nantwich is contained in the new constituency. The final result was postponed in September 2023 after he complained about the actions of a fellow candidate in the contest. In October 2023, Aphra Brandreth (daughter of broadcaster and former City of Chester MP Gyles Brandreth) was selected as the Conservative candidate for Chester South and Eddisbury.

He announced in February 2024 that he would stand down at the 2024 general election following a boundary review and changes in his personal life. However, on 3 June 2024, he was selected as the Conservative candidate for Bexhill and Battle at the 2024 general election. At the general election, he was elected to Parliament as MP for Bexhill and Battle with 33.9% of the vote and a majority of 2,657.

== Personal life ==
Mullan is gay. He plays rugby and has spoken out against plans by the Rugby Football Union (RFU) to ban tackles above the waist in the community game.

Parliament of the United Kingdom
Preceded by Laura Smith	Member of Parliament for Crewe and Nantwich; 2019–2024	Succeeded by Connor Naismith
Preceded by Huw Merriman	Member of Parliament for Bexhill and Battle; 2024–present	Incumbent
