= Crewe and Nantwich (constituency) =

UK Parliament constituency (since 1983)

Coordinates: 53°5′N 2°29′W

- County constituency for the House of Commons
- Interactive map of boundaries since 2024
- Location within North West England
- County: Cheshire
- Electorate: 76,236 (March 2020)
- Major settlements: Crewe, Nantwich

Current constituency
- Created: 1983
- Member of Parliament: Connor Naismith (Labour)
- Seats: One
- Created from: Crewe, Nantwich

Crewe and Nantwich is a constituency in Cheshire represented in the House of Commons of the UK Parliament. It was created in 1983; since 2024 its Member of Parliament (MP) has been Connor Naismith of the Labour Party.

== Constituency profile ==
The Crewe and Nantwich constituency is located in Cheshire and is centred on the large town of Crewe, which has a population of around 74,000. It also contains the smaller town of Nantwich and the villages of Willaston, Shavington and Haslington. Crewe is known for its importance as a railway town. The Crewe Works rail engineering facility was once a major employer in the town before its decline in the 1980s. Nantwich is a historic market town known for its Tudor and Georgian architecture. High levels of deprivation are present in Crewe, whilst Nantwich and the villages surrounding Crewe are wealthier.

Compared to national averages, residents of the constituency are more religious and have lower levels of income, education and professional employment. At the 2021 census, 93% of the population were White. At the local council, both towns are mostly represented by Labour Party councillors whilst the villages and rural parts of the constituency elected Conservatives. Most voters in the constituency supported leaving the European Union in the 2016 referendum; an estimated 59% voted in favour of Brexit compared to 52% nationwide.

== Political history ==
The seat had been a marginal seat since 2008, as its winner's majority had not exceeded 11.8% of the vote since the 18.9% majority won in that year. A swing seat, it has changed hands three times since 2008. Its 2017 general election result was the eighth-closest result, a winning margin of 48 votes. In 2019, the Conservative candidate secured a 15.7% majority. The 2024 General Election saw a 20.7% majority in favour of Labour.

On its formation for the 1983 general election, the Labour MP Gwyneth Dunwoody, who had served for the previous constituency of Crewe, came close to losing her second seat in 1983 (she had earlier lost her Exeter seat in 1970), when she scraped in by just 290 votes. Dunwoody increased her majorities at the general elections of 1987, 1992 and 1997. Her majority was slightly reduced at the 2001 and 2005 general elections. She died on 17 April 2008, after 34 years representing the seat and its predecessor, leading to a by-election held on 22 May 2008 which was won by the Conservative candidate Edward Timpson. The Labour candidate, Dunwoody's daughter Tamsin, came a distant second. Having previously enjoyed a considerable lead in support over the Conservatives (as indicated in Gwyneth Dunwoody's over 7,000 majority in 2005), the Labour government had lost support due to the onset of the Great Recession and Gordon Brown’s relatively weak image as a leader.

The by-election produced the first Conservative MP for the seat and nationally the first gain for a Conservative Party candidate at a parliamentary by-election since the Mitcham and Morden by-election in 1982 during the Falklands War, and the first from Labour since the Ilford North by-election of 1978.

Timpson held the seat until 2017, where Labour's Laura Smith gained it with a narrow majority of just 48 votes, the closest margin in the seat's history and the second-narrowest Labour gain of the election (behind Kensington, at 20 votes). In the 2019 general election the Conservatives regained the seat with a majority of 8,508 on a swing of 7.9% to the Conservatives, with Kieran Mullan becoming the new MP. Edward Timpson became the Conservatives' 2019 candidate for Eddisbury, replacing Antoinette Sandbach, who lost the whip earlier that year due to her opposition to a no-deal Brexit; Timpson regained the seat for the Conservatives.

The 2024 general election saw Labour’s Connor Naismith regain the seat from the Conservatives on a swing of 16.1% to Labour.

== Boundaries ==
=== Historic ===
==== 1983–1997 ====
- The Borough of Crewe and Nantwich wards of Acton, Alexandra, Audlem, Barony Weaver, Bunbury, Combermere, Coppenhall, Delamere, Grosvenor, Maw Green, Minshull, Peckforton, Queens Park, Ruskin Park, St Barnabas, St John's, Shavington, Waldron, Wellington, Weston Park, Willaston East, Willaston West, Wistaston, Wrenbury, and Wybunbury

Comprised the former Municipal Borough of Crewe, previously making up about half of the abolished constituency of Crewe, together with Nantwich and remaining parts of the new Borough of Crewe and Nantwich (excluding Haslington), previously in the abolished constituency of Nantwich.

==== 1997–2010 ====
- The Borough of Crewe and Nantwich wards of Alexandra, Barony Weaver, Coppenhall, Delamere, Grosvenor, Haslington, Maw Green, Queens Park, Ruskin Park, St Barnabas, St John's, Shavington, Waldron, Wellington, Weston Park, Willaston East, Willaston West, Wistaston, and Wybunbury

The rural wards of Acton, Audlem, Bunbury, Combermere, Minshull, Peckforton, and Wrenbury were transferred to Eddisbury. To compensate for this loss, Haslington was transferred from Congleton.

Map of boundaries 2010-2024

==== 2010–2024 ====
The Parliamentary Constituencies (England) Order 2007 made only minor changes to Crewe and Nantwich. However, before this came into force for the 2010 election, the Borough of Crewe and Natwich was abolished on 1 April 2009, becoming part of the new unitary authority of Cheshire East. Consequently, the constituency's boundaries were revised to:

- The Borough of Cheshire East wards of Crewe Central, Crewe East, Crewe North, Crewe St Barnabas, Crewe South, Crewe West, Haslington, Leighton (most), Nantwich North & West, Nantwich South & Stapeley, Shavington, Willaston & Rope, Wistaston, and Wybunbury.

=== Current ===
Further to the 2023 review of Westminster constituencies, which came into effect for the 2024 general election, the constituency is composed of the following wards of the Borough of Cheshire East (as they existed on 1 December 2020):

- Crewe Central, Crewe East, Crewe North, Crewe St Barnabas, Crewe South, Crewe West, Haslington, Leighton, Nantwich North & West, Nantwich South & Stapeley, Shavington, Willaston & Rope, and Wistaston.

Wybunbury moved to Chester South and Eddisbury to bring the electorate within the permitted range.

== Members of Parliament ==
Election	Member	Party
1983	Gwyneth Dunwoody	Labour
2008 by-election	Edward Timpson	Conservative
2017	Laura Smith	Labour
2019	Kieran Mullan	Conservative
2024	Connor Naismith	Labour

== Elections ==
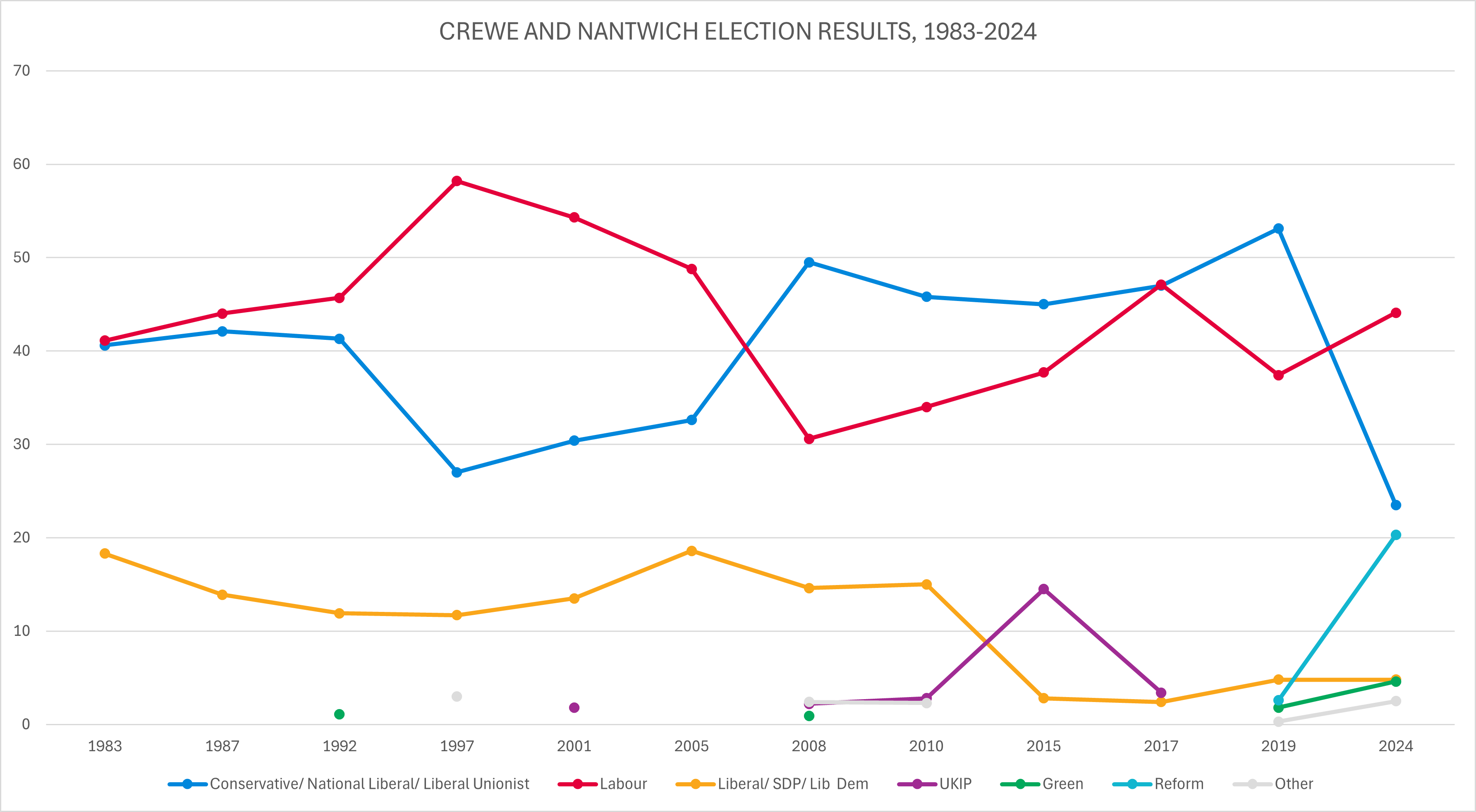
Election results 1983-2024

=== Elections in the 2020s ===
General election 2024: Crewe and Nantwich
Party	Candidate	Votes	%	±%
Labour	Connor Naismith	20,837	44.1	+4.9
Conservative	Ben Fletcher	11,110	23.5	−27.3
Reform	Matt Wood	9,602	20.3	+17.7
Liberal Democrats	Matt Theobald	2,286	4.8	−0.3
Green	Te Ata Browne	2,151	4.6	+2.7
Putting Crewe First	Brian Silvester	588	1.2	N/A
Workers Party	Phillip Lane	373	0.8	N/A
Monster Raving Loony	Lord Psychobilly Tractor	250	0.5	N/A
Rejected ballots		140		
Majority		9,727	20.6	N/A
Turnout		47,197	60.2	–5.6
Registered electors		78,423		
Labour gain from Conservative		Swing	▲16.1	

Changes are from notional results of the 2019 election, using the new boundaries.

=== Elections in the 2010s ===
2019 notional result
Party	Vote	%
Conservative	25,511	50.8
Labour	19,695	39.2
Liberal Democrats	2,573	5.1
Brexit Party	1,317	2.6
Green	951	1.9
Others	149	0.3
Turnout	50,196	65.8
Electorate	76,236	

General election 2019: Crewe and Nantwich
Party	Candidate	Votes	%	±%
Conservative	Kieran Mullan	28,704	53.1	+6.1
Labour	Laura Smith	20,196	37.4	−9.7
Liberal Democrats	Matthew Theobald	2,618	4.8	+2.4
Brexit Party	Matt Wood	1,390	2.6	N/A
Green	Te Ata Browne	975	1.8	N/A
Libertarian	Andrew Kinsman	149	0.3	N/A
Majority		8,508	15.7	N/A
Turnout		54,032	67.3	−2.4
Conservative gain from Labour		Swing	+7.9	

General election 2017: Crewe and Nantwich
Party	Candidate	Votes	%	±%
Labour	Laura Smith	25,928	47.1	+9.4
Conservative	Edward Timpson	25,880	47.0	+2.0
UKIP	Michael Stanley	1,885	3.4	−11.1
Liberal Democrats	David Crowther	1,334	2.4	−0.4
Majority		48	0.1	N/A
Turnout		55,027	69.7	+2.3
Labour gain from Conservative		Swing	+3.7	

General election 2015: Crewe and Nantwich
Party	Candidate	Votes	%	±%
Conservative	Edward Timpson	22,445	45.0	−0.8
Labour	Adrian Heald	18,825	37.7	+3.7
UKIP	Richard Lee	7,252	14.5	+11.7
Liberal Democrats	Roy Wood	1,374	2.8	−12.2
Majority		3,620	7.3	−4.5
Turnout		49,896	67.4	+1.5
Conservative hold		Swing	−2.3	

General election 2010: Crewe and Nantwich
Party	Candidate	Votes	%	±%
Conservative	Edward Timpson	23,420	45.8	+12.9
Labour	David Williams	17,374	34.0	−14.4
Liberal Democrats	Roy Wood	7,656	15.0	−3.7
UKIP	James Clutton	1,414	2.8	N/A
BNP	Phil Williams	1,043	2.0	N/A
Independent	Mike Parsons	177	0.3	N/A
Majority		6,046	11.8	N/A
Turnout		51,084	65.9	−2.0
Conservative gain from Labour		Swing	+17.6	

=== Elections in the 2000s ===
2008 by-election: Crewe and Nantwich
Party	Candidate	Votes	%	±%
Conservative	Edward Timpson	20,539	49.5	+16.9
Labour	Tamsin Dunwoody	12,679	30.6	−18.2
Liberal Democrats	Elizabeth Shenton	6,040	14.6	−4.0
UKIP	Mike Nattrass	922	2.2	N/A
Green	Robert Smith	359	0.9	N/A
English Democrat	David Roberts	275	0.7	N/A
Monster Raving Loony	The Flying Brick	236	0.6	N/A
Independent	Mark Walklate	217	0.5	N/A
Cut Tax on Diesel and Petrol	Paul Thorogood	118	0.3	N/A
Independent	Gemma Garrett	113	0.3	N/A
Majority		7,860	18.9	N/A
Turnout		41,498	58.2	−1.8
Conservative gain from Labour		Swing	+17.6	

General election 2005: Crewe and Nantwich
Party	Candidate	Votes	%	±%
Labour	Gwyneth Dunwoody	21,240	48.8	−5.5
Conservative	Eveleigh Moore-Dutton	14,162	32.6	+2.2
Liberal Democrats	Paul Roberts	8,083	18.6	+5.1
Majority		7,078	16.2	−6.7
Turnout		43,485	60.0	−0.2
Labour hold		Swing	-3.7	

General election 2001: Crewe and Nantwich
Party	Candidate	Votes	%	±%
Labour	Gwyneth Dunwoody	22,556	54.3	−3.9
Conservative	Donald Potter	12,650	30.4	+3.4
Liberal Democrats	David Cannon	5,595	13.5	+1.8
UKIP	Roger Croston	746	1.8	N/A
Majority		9,906	23.9	−7.3
Turnout		41,547	60.2	−13.7
Labour hold		Swing	−3.8	

=== Elections in the 1990s ===
General election 1997: Crewe and Nantwich
Party	Candidate	Votes	%	±%
Labour	Gwyneth Dunwoody	29,460	58.2	+10.6
Conservative	Michael Loveridge	13,662	27.0	−11.5
Liberal Democrats	David Cannon	5,940	11.7	−0.8
Referendum	Peter Astbury	1,543	3.0	N/A
Majority		15,798	31.2	+26.8
Turnout		50,605	73.9	−8.0
Labour hold		Swing	+13.4	

General election 1992: Crewe and Nantwich
Party	Candidate	Votes	%	±%
Labour	Gwyneth Dunwoody	28,065	45.7	+1.7
Conservative	Brian Silvester	25,370	41.3	−0.8
Liberal Democrats	Gwyn Griffiths	7,315	11.9	−2.0
Green	Natalie Wilkinson	651	1.1	N/A
Majority		2,695	4.4	+2.5
Turnout		61,401	81.9	+2.6
Labour hold		Swing	+1.3	

=== Elections in the 1980s ===
General election 1987: Crewe and Nantwich
Party	Candidate	Votes	%	±%
Labour	Gwyneth Dunwoody	25,457	44.0	+2.9
Conservative	Angela Browning	24,365	42.1	+1.5
SDP	Kenneth Roberts	8,022	13.9	−4.4
Majority		1,092	1.9	+1.4
Turnout		57,844	79.3	+4.6
Labour hold		Swing		

General election 1983: Crewe and Nantwich
Party	Candidate	Votes	%	±%
Labour	Gwyneth Dunwoody	22,031	41.1	
Conservative	Patrick Rock	21,741	40.6	
SDP	John Pollard	9,820	18.3	
Majority		290	0.5	
Turnout		53,592	74.7	
Labour win (new seat)				

== See also ==
- List of parliamentary constituencies in Cheshire
- History of parliamentary constituencies and boundaries in Cheshire
