= Basford, Cheshire =

Hamlet in Cheshire, England

Coordinates: 53.066°N 2.425°W

Basford
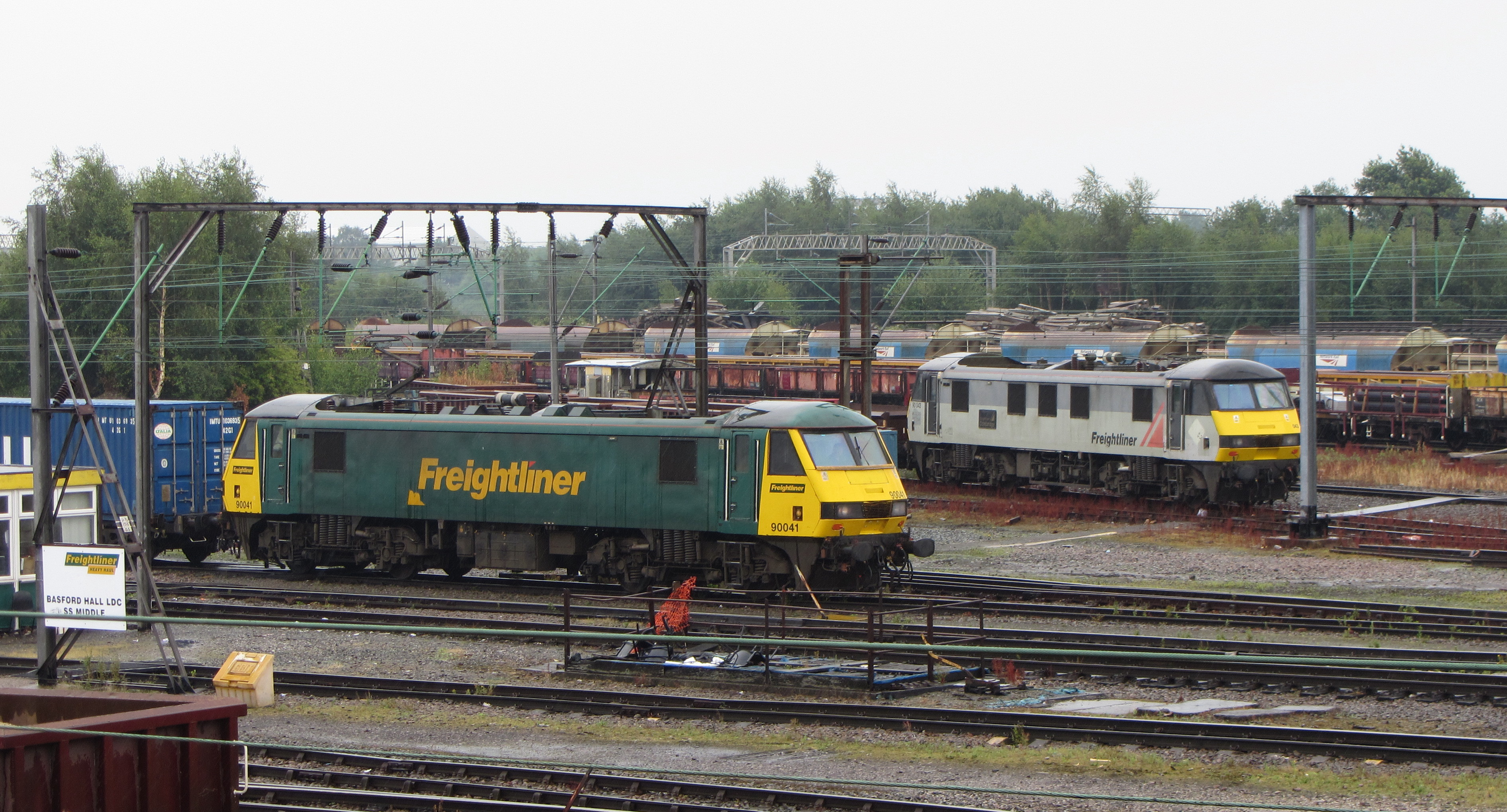
- Locomotives at Basford Hall Yard

- Location within Cheshire
- Population: 256 (2011)
- OS grid reference: SJ715522
- Civil parish: Weston and Crewe Green
- Unitary authority: Cheshire East
- Ceremonial county: Cheshire
- Region: North West
- Country: England
- Sovereign state: United Kingdom
- Post town: CREWE
- Postcode district: CW2
- Dialling code: 01270
- Police: Cheshire
- Fire: Cheshire
- Ambulance: North West
- UK Parliament: Crewe and Nantwich

Basford is a hamlet and former civil parish, now in the parish of Weston and Crewe Green, in the unitary authority area of Cheshire East and the ceremonial county of Cheshire, England, lying immediately south of Crewe. Nearby villages include Shavington, Weston, Hough and Chorlton. The population was 256 in 2011. Basford was first recorded in the Domesday survey and had a moated manor. The modern parish is bisected by the A500 and the Crewe-to-Stafford railway line, and includes Basford Hall Sorting Sidings.

== History ==
Tools and weapons made of flint have been discovered in the parish. Berchesford was a small manor at the time of the Domesday survey in 1086. The name is thought to mean either "ford near birch trees" or the ford associated with a personal name, such as Beorcal, Borkr or Barkr. Three separate manors are recorded, which probably represent Basford, Weston and Hough, held by Owine, Erlekin and Leofric. Basford Hall was formerly a moated manor; the building was lost to fire in around 1700, and the remains were covered by the railway development. Basford formerly had a railway station. The A500 bypass opened in 2003.

Onward Housing is developing a 450-home scheme in the parish. 123 properties are to be designated as affordable and the remainder for sale. This site is designated a strategic location for housing in the Cheshire East Local Plan, part of Cheshire East Council's plan for 850 homes in the village with a new local centre, including a primary school, shops and community centre, supported by a £2.2 million Homes England grant with investments of £4.5 million for road improvements, £1.5 million towards a new local primary school and £670,000 for new bus services, cycle lanes and pedestrian routes.

== Governance ==
The civil parish is administered by Weston and Basford Parish Council, jointly with the adjacent larger parish of Weston. From 1974 the civil parish was served by Crewe and Nantwich Borough Council, which was succeeded on 1 April 2009 by the new unitary authority of Cheshire East. Basford falls in the parliamentary constituency of Crewe and Nantwich, and has been represented by Kieran Mullan since the 2019 General Election.

Basford was formerly a township in the parish of Wybunbury, in 1866 Basford became a civil parish, on 1 April 2023 the parish was abolished to form "Weston and Crewe Green".

== Geography and transport ==
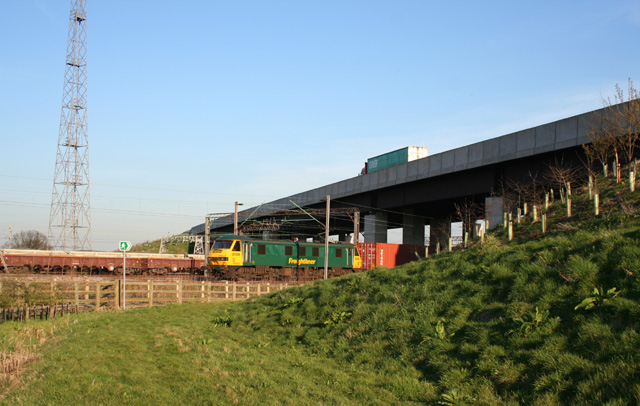
A500 crossing the railway line in 2007

The civil parish has a total area of 297.57 hectares (735.3 acres). The A500 runs east–west through the parish, and the Crewe-to-Stafford railway line runs north west to south east through it; there are currently no stations within Basford (as of 2020). To the north of the A500 is Basford Hall Sorting Sidings. Weston Lane runs east–west south of the A500, connecting Shavington and Weston. Back Lane and Casey Lane run south and south west, respectively, from Weston Lane to meet immediately north east of Hough, on the southern boundary of Basford parish. Casey Lane crosses the railway at Casey Bridge. The South Cheshire Way and the Crewe and Nantwich Circular Walk long-distance footpaths go through the south-east corner, crossing Basford Brook at a footbridge.

Most of the existing settlement in the parish lies to the south of the A500; large housing developments in the northern area were under consideration in late 2017. The hamlet of Basford lies along Weston Lane and at the junction with Back Lane.

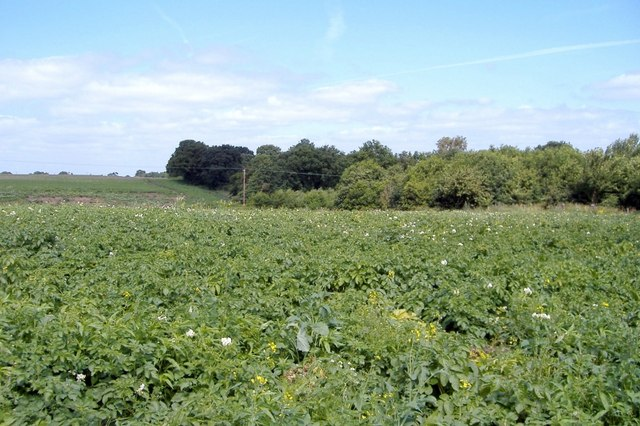
Arable land near Burrow Coppice, from the South Cheshire Way in 2006

The terrain is predominantly flat, sloping gently upwards from an elevation of around 50 metres (160 ft) in the north to 60–65 metres (197–213 ft) in the south. Swill Brook runs along part of the western boundary, Gresty Brook along part of the northern boundary, and Basford Brook along or just inside parts of the eastern boundary. Small areas of woodland are located near the eastern boundary, including Burrow Coppice and an unnamed woodland flanking Basford Brook. There are occasional ponds or meres scattered across the area.

== Demography ==
According to the 2001 census Basford had a population of 266, reducing slightly to 256 in 115 households at the 2011 census. This is an increase on the 19th-century population; the historical figures are 55 (1801), 69 (1851), 77 (1881), 69 (1901) and 229 (1951).

== Education ==
There are no educational facilities in Basford. The civil parish falls within the catchment area of Shavington Academy; the area to the west of the railway line falls in the catchment of Shavington Primary School, and that to the east, Weston Village Primary School.
