= Listed buildings in Hough, Cheshire =

Hough is a former civil parish in Cheshire East, England. It contained three buildings that are recorded in the National Heritage List for England as designated listed buildings. Of these, two are listed at Grade II*, the middle grade, and the other is at Grade II. The parish included the village of Hough and is otherwise rural. The listed buildings consist of two houses and a gateway.

== Key ==
Grade	Criteria
II*	Particularly important buildings of more than special interest
II	Buildings of national importance and special interest

== Buildings ==
Name and location	Photograph	Date	Notes	Grade
Hough Hall; 53.05373°N 2.43660°W	—	17th century	A house that was altered later. It is built in brick with stone dressings, and has a tiled roof. The house is in two storeys with an attic, and has a symmetrical three-bay front. In the centre is a doorway with pilasters, an open pediment, and a fanlight. The windows in the original part are sashes, those in the attic being in dormers. The 20th-century extension contains casement windows and an oriel window.	II*
Gates, piers, screen and wall 53.05318°N 2.43698°W	—	Early 18th century	This is a gateway in wrought iron, stone and brick that has been attributed to Robert Bakewell or his assistant Benjamin Yates. It is elaborately decorated and consists of double gates between piers with an overthrow, all in wrought iron. To the sides are railings on a brick wall with stone coping.	II*
Hough Manor; 53.05542°N 2.43948°W	—	Early 18th century	A small country house in early Georgian style. It is in brick with a tiled roof. The house is in two storeys and has an entrance front of five bays. There is a central doorway with a gabled porch, and the windows are sashes.	II

== See also ==
- Listed buildings in Blakenhall
- Listed buildings in Chorlton
- Listed buildings in Lea
- Listed buildings in Shavington cum Gresty
- Listed buildings in Wybunbury
