= Weston, Cheshire East =

Village in Cheshire, England

Coordinates: 53.066°N 2.404°W

Weston
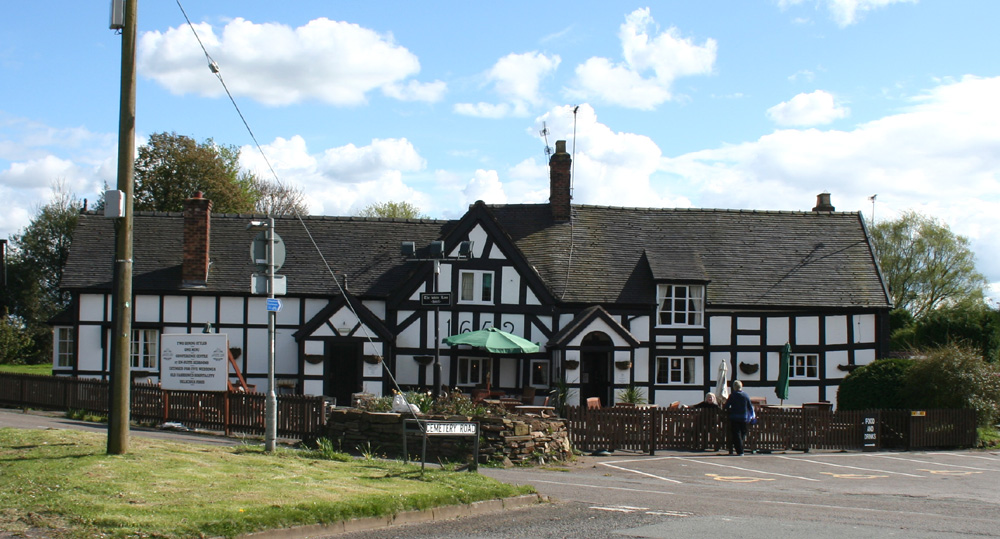
- White Lion Inn, Weston

- Location within Cheshire
- Population: 1,855 (2011)
- OS grid reference: SJ730522
- Civil parish: Weston and Crewe Green
- Unitary authority: Cheshire East
- Ceremonial county: Cheshire
- Region: North West
- Country: England
- Sovereign state: United Kingdom
- Post town: CREWE
- Postcode district: CW2
- Dialling code: 01270
- Police: Cheshire
- Fire: Cheshire
- Ambulance: North West
- UK Parliament: Crewe and Nantwich

Weston is a village (at SJ730522) and former civil parish, now in the parish of Weston and Crewe Green, in the unitary authority area of Cheshire East and the ceremonial county of Cheshire, England. The village lies 3 miles to the south east of Crewe. The parish also includes the small settlements of Carters Green, Gorstyhill, Rose Hill, Snape, Stowford and part of Englesea Brook, as well as the new settlements of Wychwood Park and Wychwood Village. Plans in 2015 to develop a golf course surrounding Wychwood Village for residential housing have been opposed by some residents. The plans were refused planning permission by Cheshire East Council; the developer was later unsuccessful in an appeal to the Secretary of State and the council's refusal was upheld. Nearby villages include Basford, Hough and Shavington. In 2011 the parish had a population of 1,855.

== Governance ==
The civil parish was administered jointly with the adjacent parish of Basford. The Weston and Basford Parish Council meets monthly and discusses a wide range of community issues. From 1974 the civil parish was served by Crewe and Nantwich Borough Council, which was succeeded on 1 April 2009 by the unitary authority of Cheshire East. Weston falls in the parliamentary constituency of Crewe and Nantwich, which has been represented by Kieran Mullan since 2019, after being represented by Laura Smith (2017–19), Edward Timpson (2008–17) and Gwyneth Dunwoody (1983–2008).

Church of All Saints

Weston was formerly a township and chapelry in the parish of Wybunbury, from 1866 Weston was a civil parish in its own right, on 1 April 2023 the parish was abolished to form "Weston and Crewe Green" and "Hough and Chorlton".

== Geography and transport ==
Basford Brook runs north–south at the western edge of the parish, forming the boundary with the adjacent parishes of Basford and Chorlton in some places. Many small meres and ponds are scattered across the farmland. There are several small areas of woodland within the parish, including Meremoor Moss.

The A500 dual carriageway ran east–west through the parish; additionally, the A5020 ran north–south and the A531 runs from the north east to the south west. The Crewe–Alsager railway line also ran east–west towards the north of the parish. The South Cheshire Way passed through the civil parish.

== Demography ==
According to the 2001 census, the civil parish had a population of 969, in 399 households. The population taken at the 2011 Census was 1,855. The population has increased significantly since 1951; historical population figures are 348 (1801), 514 (1851), 474 (1901) and 544 (1951).

== Places of worship ==
The Church of All Saints in Weston village was founded in 1838 and became a parish church in 1841; the Wesleyan Methodist Chapel on Cemetery Road is also in the village, but has since been converted into residential accommodation. Both are listed at grade II. A cemetery, founded in 1902, is located on Cemetery Road.

== Other landmarks ==
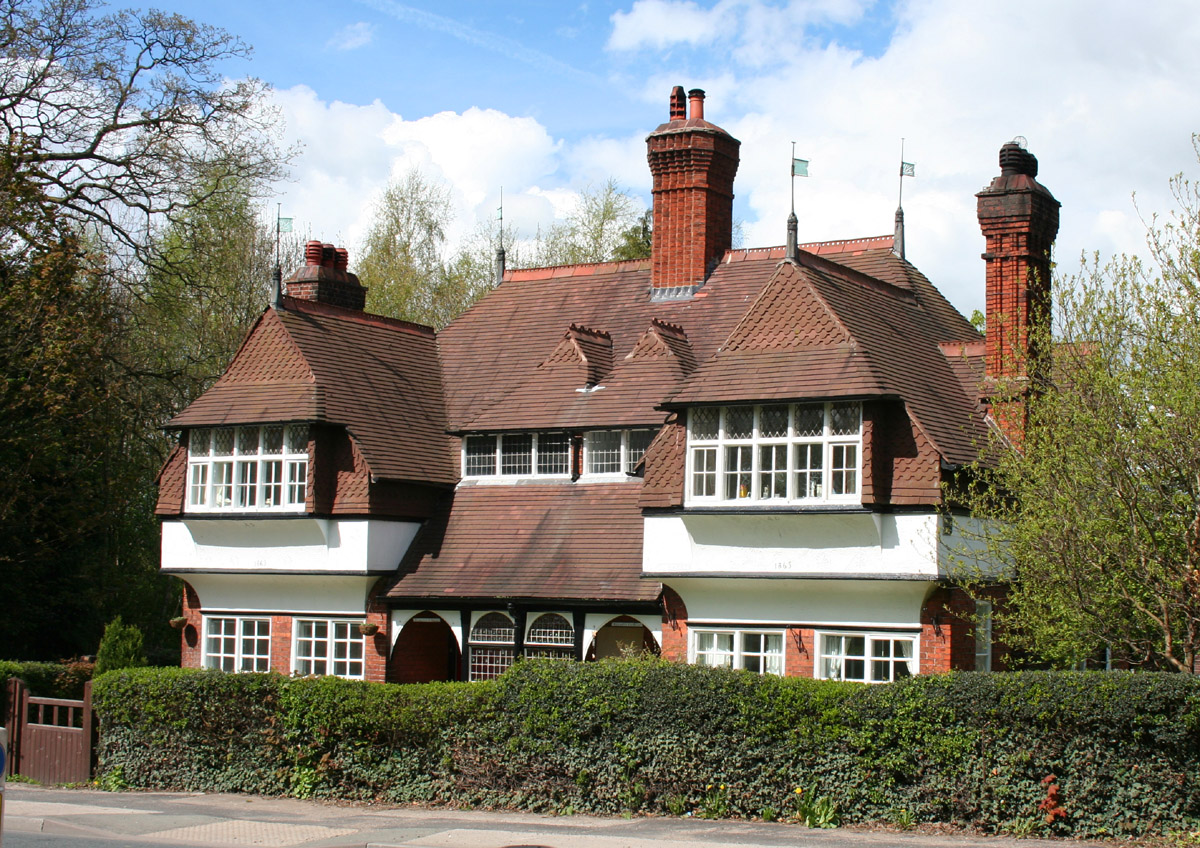
Stowford and Magnolia Cottages

Weston Hall, off Main Road, is listed at grade II*. The White Lion Inn in Weston village is listed at grade II.

Several buildings in Stowford and on Weston Road are listed at grade II. These include the Weston Road gatelodge to Crewe Hall, Stowford Lodge, The Smithy and Smithy Cottage, Elm, Beech, Walnut and Oak Tree Cottages, Firtree Cottage and Stowford and Magnolia Cottages.

== Education ==
Weston Village Primary School serves Weston and parts of the adjacent civil parishes of Basford and Chorlton. The parish falls within the catchment area of Shavington Academy in Shavington.

== Notable people ==
Hugh Bourne (1772–1852), one of the founders of Primitive Methodism, is buried in the graveyard of Englesea Brook Chapel. Frank Blunstone (born 1934), former Crewe Alexandra footballer and the earliest-surviving England player, lived in Weston as of 2005.

== See also ==
- Listed buildings in Weston, Cheshire East
