= Hough, Cheshire =

Village in Cheshire, England

Coordinates: 53.055°N 2.428°W

Hough
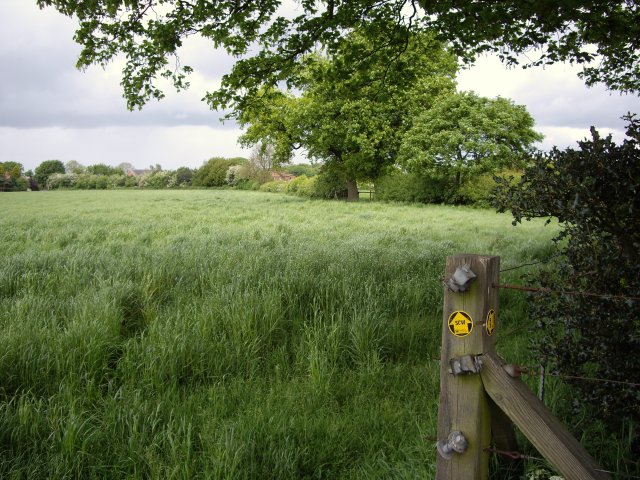
- The South Cheshire Way in Hough

- Location within Cheshire
- Population: 808 (2011)
- OS grid reference: SJ712509
- Civil parish: Hough and Chorlton
- Unitary authority: Cheshire East
- Ceremonial county: Cheshire
- Region: North West
- Country: England
- Sovereign state: United Kingdom
- Post town: CREWE
- Postcode district: CW2
- Dialling code: 01270
- Police: Cheshire
- Fire: Cheshire
- Ambulance: North West
- UK Parliament: Crewe and Nantwich

Hough (/hʌf/ huf) is a village (at SJ712509) and former civil parish, now in the parish of Hough and Chorlton, in the unitary authority area of Cheshire East and the ceremonial county of Cheshire, England. The village is 3 miles (4.8 km) south of Crewe and 4 miles (6.4 km) east of Nantwich. The parish also included part of the settlement of Goodalls Corner. The total population is a little over 800, measured at 808 in the 2011 Census. Nearby villages include Basford, Chorlton, Shavington, Weston and Wybunbury.

== Governance ==
Hough is administered by Hough & Chorlton Parish Council jointly with the adjacent parish of Chorlton. From 1974 the civil parish was served by Crewe and Nantwich Borough Council, which was succeeded on 1 April 2009 by the new unitary authority of Cheshire East. Hough falls in the parliamentary constituency of Crewe and Nantwich, which has been represented by Kieran Mullan since 2019, after being represented by Laura Smith (2017–19), Edward Timpson (2008–17) and Gwyneth Dunwoody (1983–2008).

Hough was formerly a township in the parish of Wybunbury, in 1866 Hough became a civil parish, on 1 April 2023 the parish was abolished to form "Hough and Chorlton".

== Geography and transport ==
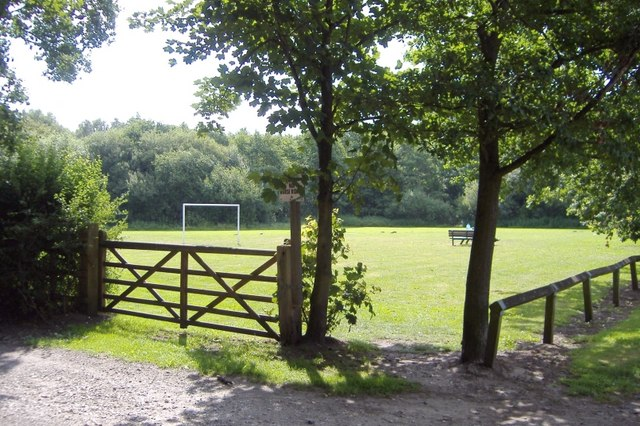
Hough Common

The area slopes gently upwards towards the south and east, from an elevation of around 50 metres at the western boundary near Wybunbury, to a high point of 76 metres at SJ714494, on the South Cheshire Way near Ellesmere Farm. Outside Hough village, the parish is predominantly rural, with the major land use being agricultural. Swill Brook runs along parts of the eastern boundary of the parish, and an unnamed tributary forms part of the southern boundary. Numerous small meres and ponds are scattered across the area. Several small areas of woodland fall within the parish, including Cobb's Moss and Hough Gates. To the east of Cobb's Lane, south of Hough village, lies Hough Common, an area of common land designated as a county site of biological importance (grade B).

Newcastle Road (the old A500) runs east–west at the north of the parish. Cobb's Lane runs north–south through the parish, joining Newcastle Road just to the north-east of the parish boundary in Chorlton. Pit Lane connects Newcastle Road and Cobb's Lane, forming a triangle in which Hough village is located. The B5071 (Stock Lane) forms a short stretch of the western boundary of the parish; it runs from Newcastle Road through Wybunbury. Wrinehill Road connects the B5071 with Cobb's Lane, forming part of the southern parish boundary. The A500 formerly ran through the parish, but now has been diverted to bypass it to the north.

The National Cycle Network Route 70 follows Cobb's Lane. Two major public footpaths cross the parish: the South Cheshire Way runs north–south and the Crewe and Nantwich Circular Walk runs east–west. The Crewe–Stafford railway line runs north–south through Chorlton, immediately to the east of the parish.

== Demography ==
According to the 2001 census, the parish had a population of 783, in 326 households. The population has more than doubled since 1951; the historical population figures were 206 (1801), 309 (1851), 324 (1901) and 330 (1951).

== Landmarks ==
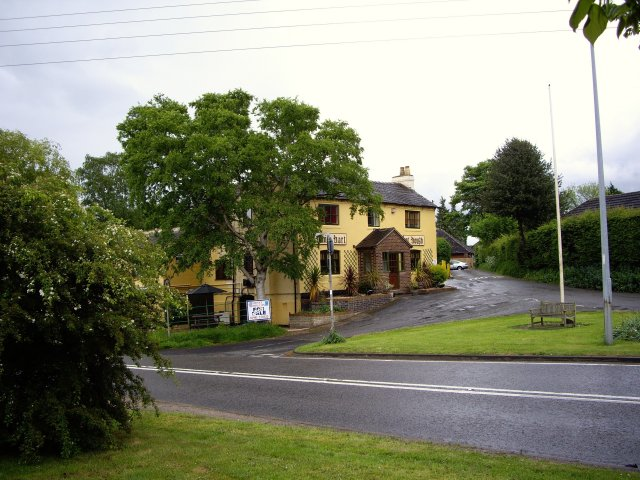
White Hart, Hough

Hough Hall is a red-brick house dating originally from the 17th century; both the house and its wrought-iron entrance gates, which date from the early 18th century, are listed at grade II*. Hough Manor is a grade-II-listed, red-brick country house dating from the mid-18th century. The Cliffe is a grade-II-listed house in brick with fake timber framing, dating from the mid-to-late 19th century.

Hough village has a public house, the White Hart, and a Primitive Methodist Chapel which is now closed and is to become part of the Englesea Brook Museum.

== Education ==
There are no educational facilities in Hough. The civil parish falls within the catchment areas of Shavington Primary School in Shavington cum Gresty and Shavington High School in Rope.

== See also ==
- Listed buildings in Hough, Cheshire
