= Shavington cum Gresty =

Civil parish in Cheshire, England

Coordinates: 53°03′40″N 02°27′00″W

Shavington Gresty
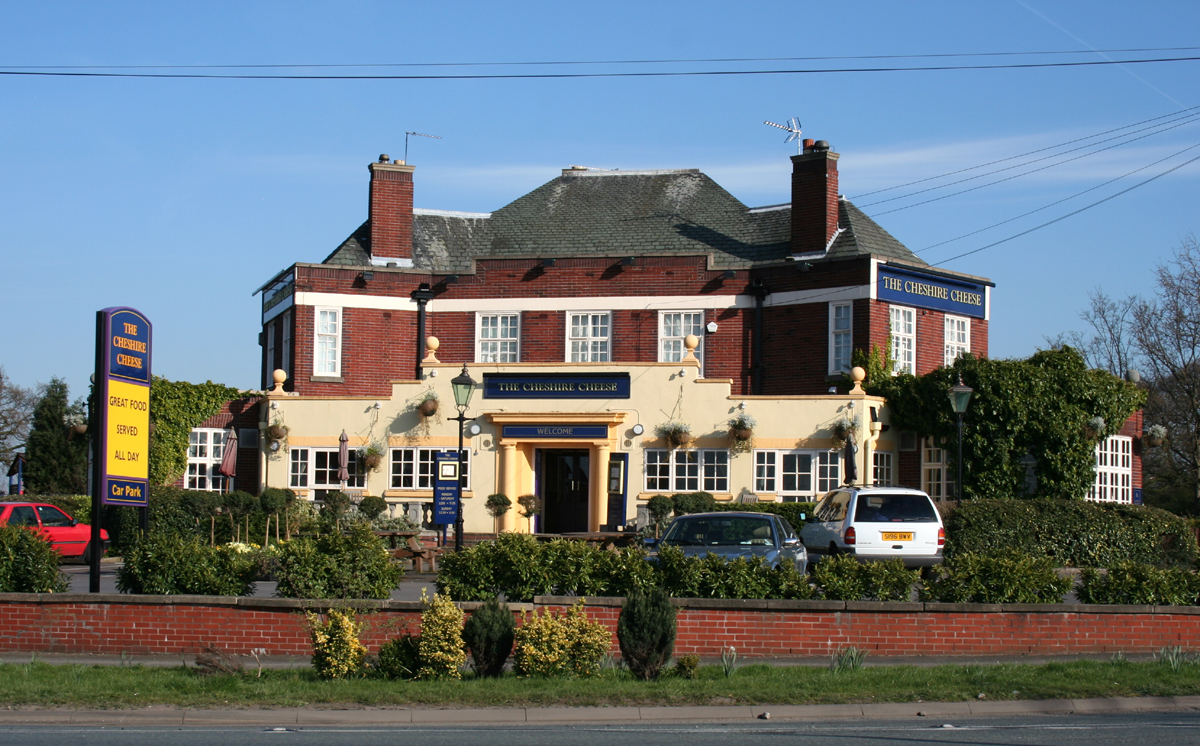
- Cheshire Cheese public house

- Location within Cheshire
- Population: 4,519 (2011)
- OS grid reference: SJ698513
- Civil parish: Shavington cum Gresty
- Unitary authority: Cheshire East
- Ceremonial county: Cheshire
- Region: North West
- Country: England
- Sovereign state: United Kingdom
- Post town: CREWE
- Postcode district: CW2
- Dialling code: 01270
- Police: Cheshire
- Fire: Cheshire
- Ambulance: North West
- UK Parliament: Crewe and Nantwich

Shavington cum Gresty (/ˈʃævɪŋtən kʌm ˈɡrɛsti/) is a civil parish in the unitary authority of Cheshire East and the ceremonial county of Cheshire, England. It lies to the south of Crewe. It includes the large village of Shavington (at SJ699518), which lies 2 1/2 miles south of Crewe, as well as the smaller settlements of Dodds Bank, Park Estate, Puseydale, Sugar Loaf and part of Goodall's Corner. Nearby villages include Basford, Hough, Willaston, Wistaston and Wybunbury. The total population of the civil parish is a little under 5,000.

== History ==
Shavington appears in the Domesday Book of 1086 as Santune; it was then held by William Malbank, who held much of the land in the Nantwich hundred. In the 19th century, Shavington had four Nonconformist chapels, only one of which remains as a place of worship. The village name means "Sceafa's farmstead". Gresty means "badger path" or "wolf path".

The village was the first victim of air raid damage in Cheshire in the Second World War when on 19 July 1940 six high-explosive bombs fell, breaking windows over a mile radius and damaging the road, but no casualties were caused.

The logo of Shavington is the Woodnoth Coat of Arms which can be seen in the logo of the Parish Council and the Primary School.

== Governance ==
Shavington cum Gresty is administered by Shavington Cum Gresty Parish Council. From 1974 the civil parish was served by Crewe and Nantwich Borough Council, which was succeeded on 1 April 2009 by the new unitary authority of Cheshire East. Shavington cum Gresty falls in the parliamentary constituency of Crewe and Nantwich, which has been represented by Kieran Mullan of the Conservative Party since the 2019 UK General Election. The current Chair of the Parish Council is Benjamin Gibbs.

Shavington-cum-Gresty Parish Council run a website for the community called Shavington Online.

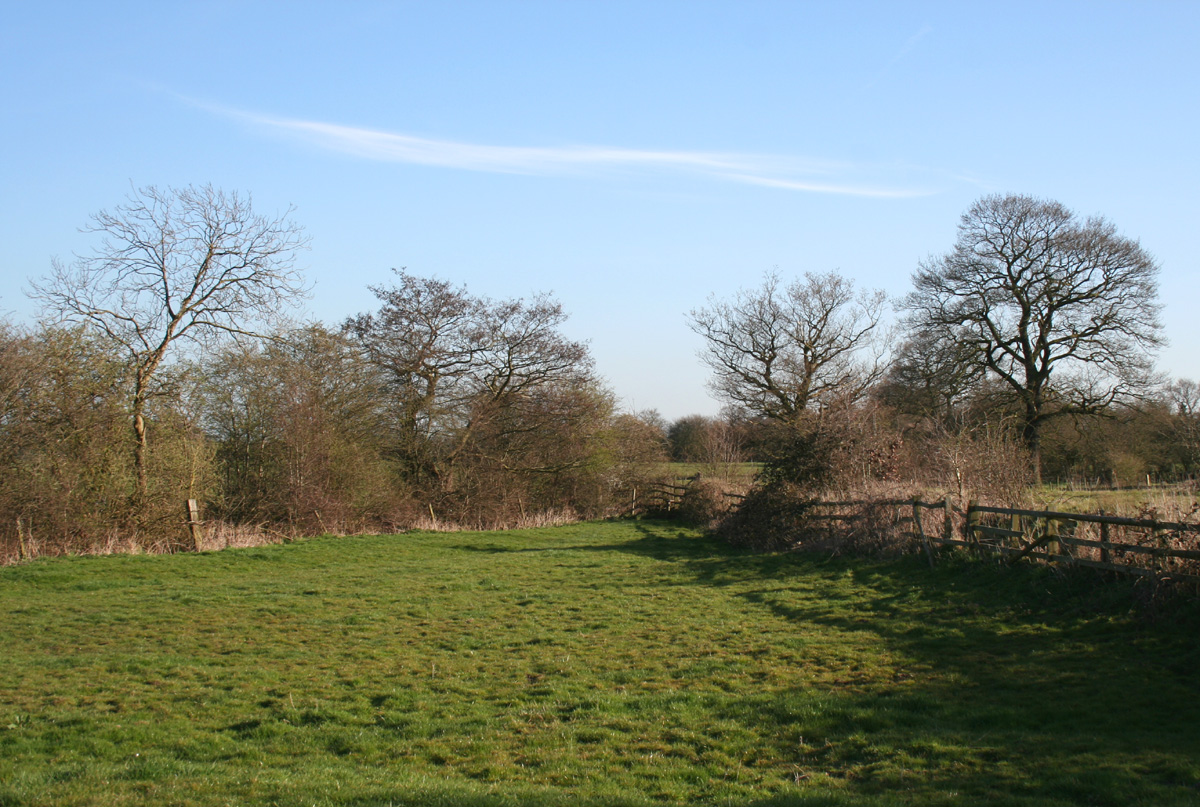
Farmland south of Crewe

== Geography and transport ==
The civil parish has a total area of 950 acres (380 ha). The terrain is relatively flat, with an average elevation of around 200 feet. Urban development has taken place at Shavington village, as well as the area immediately south of Crewe and along the B5071. Much of the remainder of the civil parish is rural, with the major land use being agricultural. Swill Brook and other unnamed brooks run through the area, and there are several small meres and ponds.

The Welsh Marches railway line, the A500 trunk road and Newcastle Road (the former route of the A500) all run east–west through the civil parish; the A500 has a junction at SJ707527. The B5071 (Crewe Road) runs north–south from Crewe to Wybunbury. A network of lanes connect the B5071 with adjacent villages; these include Gresty Lane, which runs westwards to Rope and Willaston; and Weston Lane, which runs eastwards to Basford and Weston.

== Demography ==
In 2006, the total population of the civil parish was estimated as 4,830. The 2001 census recorded a population of 4,849 in 1,954 households. By the time of the 2011 Census the population had reduced to 4,519. Historical population figures were 189 (1801), 453 (1851), 1,149 (1901) and 1,850 (1951).

== Landmarks ==
Shavington Hall is a small country house, built in 1877 for the Earl of Shrewsbury in a Tudor Revival style; it is listed at grade II. It bears the same name as the much larger seat of the Earls of Kilmorey near Adderley, Shropshire, which was demolished in 1959.

Shavington Lodge is a grade-II-listed, red-brick farmhouse, dating from the early 19th century.

St John's Methodist Chapel is on Main Road in Shavington (SJ700517); it was founded in 1876 as a Wesleyan Methodist chapel. Facilities within the civil parish include two public houses; Solt and The Vine, hairdressers, and a fish and chip shop.

== Education ==
Shavington Primary School is on South Bank Avenue in Shavington (SJ701519). It serves the majority of the civil parish of Shavington cum Gresty, as well as Hough and parts of Basford, Chorlton, Rope and Wybunbury. Parts of Shavington cum Gresty parish fall within the catchment areas of the Berkeley Primary School in Wistaston and Wybunbury Delves Church of England Primary School in Wybunbury.

The parish falls within the catchment area of Shavington Academy in Rope.

== Notable people ==
- The French poet Alfred de Vigny wrote his poem La Colère de Samson (Samson's Anger) while he was in Shavington, on 7 April 1839.
- Eric Hall (born 1954) lived in Vine Tree Avenue until 1970. Now living in Virlet, France, he is the writer, producer and presenter of "Radio Anglais" – the French Government's English language public information service broadcasts on French local radio.
- George Saul Mottershead (1894–1978) ran a market garden in the village in the 1920s. In 1930 he and his family moved to Oakfield Grange at Upton by Chester where they founded Chester Zoo.

== See also ==
- Listed buildings in Shavington cum Gresty
