= Basford Hall =

Basford Hall can refer to:

- Basford Hall, a demolished manor and small settlement now called Basford, Cheshire
- Basford Hall Yard, a railway yard near the location of the former Basford Hall
