= Rope, Cheshire =

Civil parish in Cheshire, England

Coordinates: 53.072°N 2.462°W

Rope
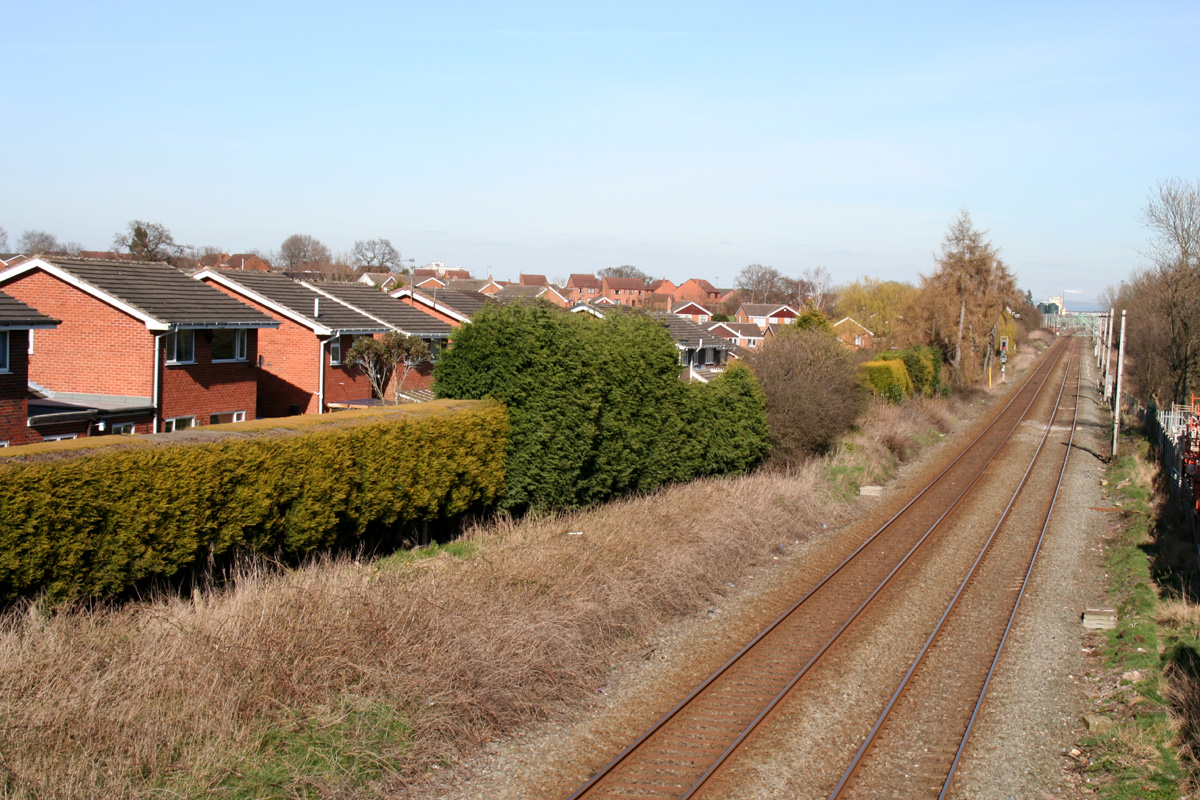
- Crewe to Nantwich railway from Ropegreen Bridge; Wells Green is on the left

- Location within Cheshire
- Population: 2,034 (2011)
- OS grid reference: SJ690528
- Civil parish: Rope
- Unitary authority: Cheshire East
- Ceremonial county: Cheshire
- Region: North West
- Country: England
- Sovereign state: United Kingdom
- Post town: CREWE
- Postcode district: CW2
- Dialling code: 01270
- Police: Cheshire
- Fire: Cheshire
- Ambulance: North West
- UK Parliament: Crewe and Nantwich

Rope is a scattered settlement and civil parish in the unitary authority of Cheshire East and the ceremonial county of Cheshire, England. It lies immediately to the south of Crewe, with the centre of the parish being around 2¼ miles from the centre of Crewe. Nearby villages include Shavington, Willaston and Wistaston. The civil parish has a total population of just over 2150, reducing to 2,034 at the 2011 Census.

== Governance ==
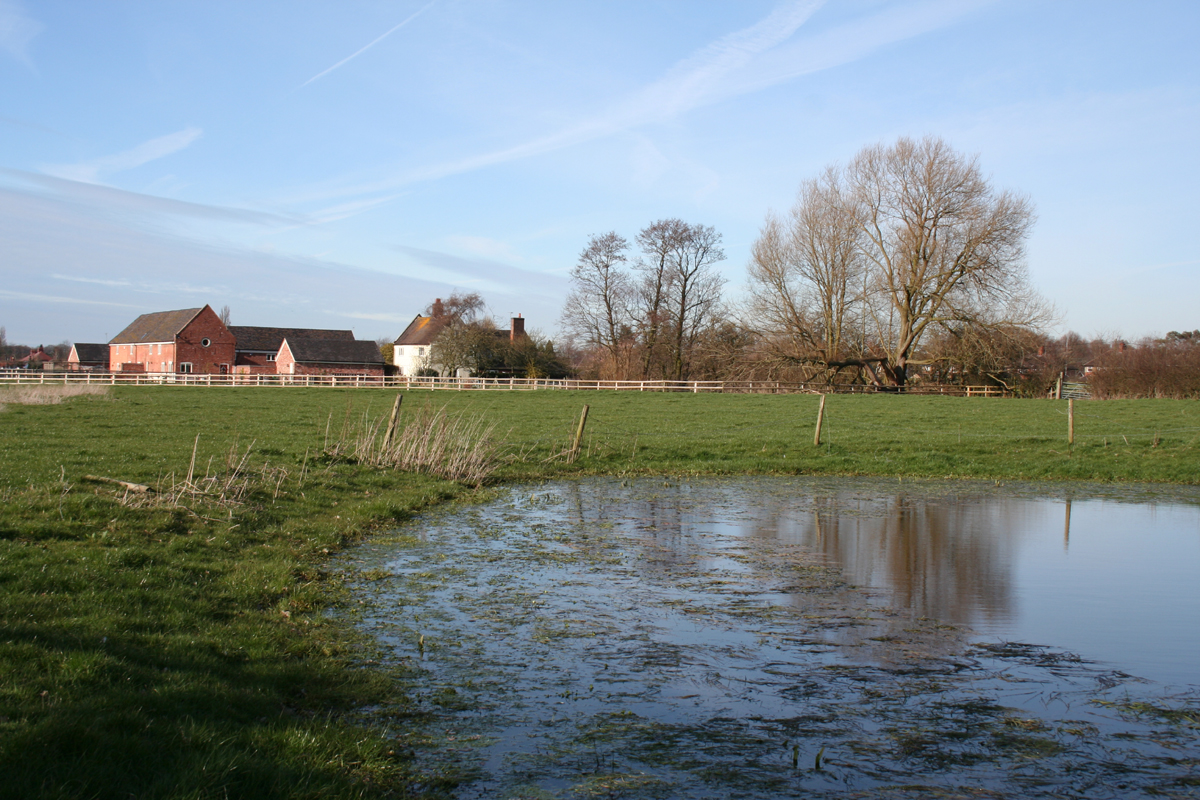
Mere near Broughton Farm

Rope is administered by Rope Parish Council. Disgraced and scandal ridden ex Cllr. Brian Silvester was rejected by the ward in 2015. Brian Silvester was spared jail but forced to pay a £70,000 fine after admitting that he put vulnerable lives at risk for rent money. From 1974 the civil parish was served by Crewe and Nantwich Borough Council, which was succeeded on 1 April 2009 by the new unitary authority of Cheshire East . Rope falls in the parliamentary constituency of Crewe and Nantwich, which has been represented by Connor Naismith since 2024, after being represented by Kieran Mullan (2019–2024), Laura Smith (2017–19), Edward Timpson (2008–17) and Gwyneth Dunwoody (1983–2008).

== Geography and transport ==
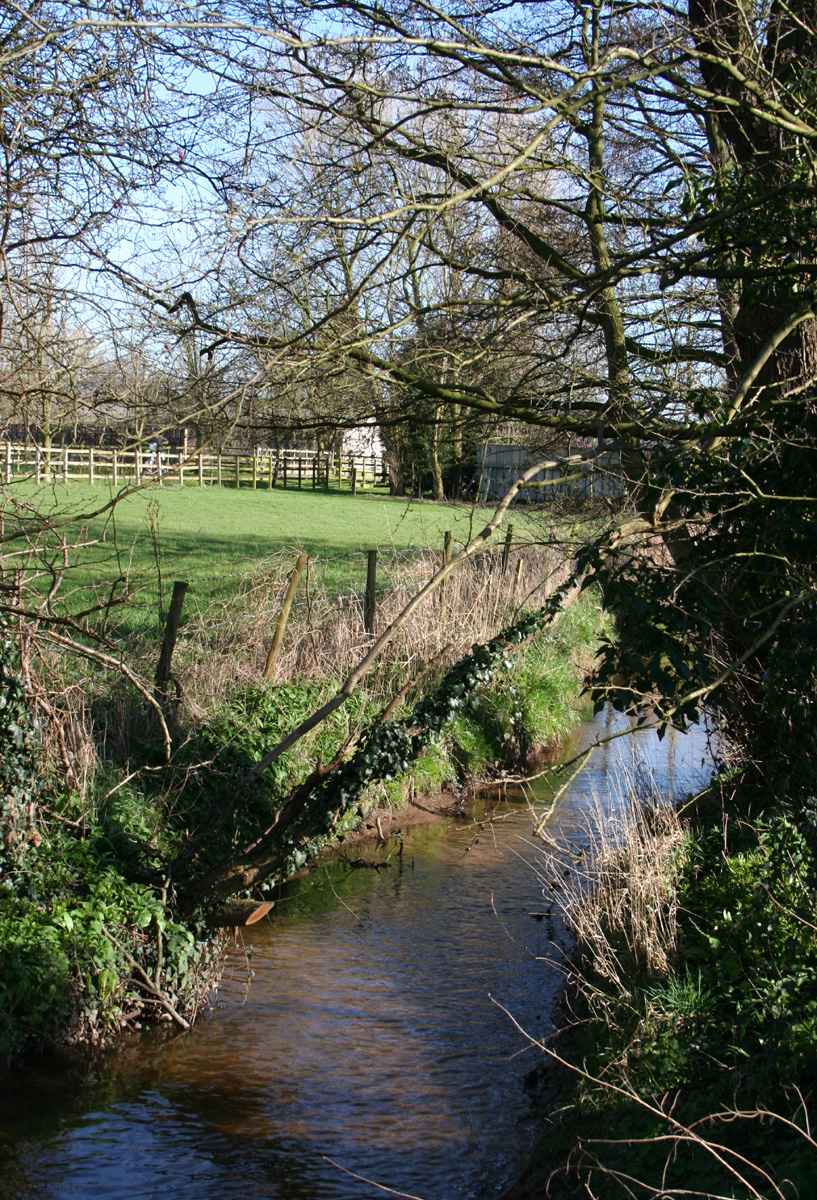
Swill Brook

Much of the area is relatively flat, with an average elevation of around 50 metres. Urban development is largely limited to the Wells Green area in north east corner of the civil parish, adjacent to Wistaston and south Crewe. Much of the remainder of the parish is rural, with the major land use being agricultural. Wellsgreen Brook and Swill Brook run through the east of the civil parish; the latter forms part of its eastern boundary. There are several other unnamed brooks within the parish, as well as several small meres and ponds.

The Crewe–Nantwich railway line runs east–west through the centre of the parish. The A500 trunk road runs around 500 metres south of the railway line, in the south of the parish. Rope Lane runs north–south through the parish, crossing the railway line at Ropegreen Bridge; it connects Crewe and Shavington. Gresty Lane/Eastern Road runs east–west through the parish immediately south of the railway, and connects Willaston with the B5071 north of Shavington.

== Demography ==
According to the 2001 census, the civil parish had a population of 2155 in 778 households. The historical population figures were 79 (1801), 96 (1851), 62 (1901) and 177 (1951).

== Education ==
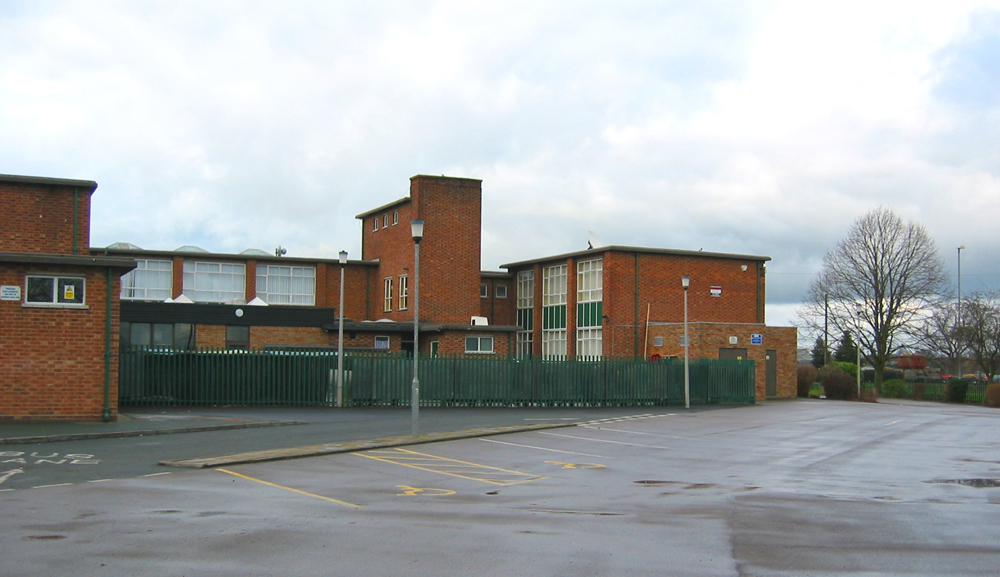
Shavington Academy

Shavington Academy, located on Rope Lane at SJ694523, provides secondary education for Rope and civil parishes to the south of Crewe. Berkeley Primary School, at SJ695531, provides primary education for the northern half of the civil parish, as well as parts of Wistaston and Shavington cum Gresty. The southern half of the parish falls within the catchment area of Shavington Primary School in Shavington.
