= Chorlton, Cheshire East =

Village in Cheshire, England

Coordinates: 53.050°N 2.407°W

Chorlton
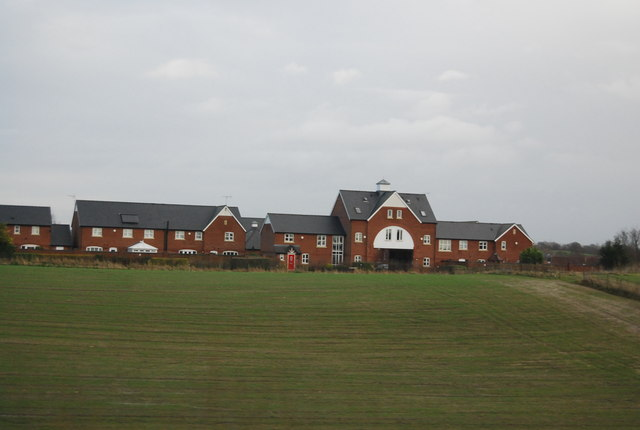
- New houses, Wychwood Park, Chorlton

- Location within Cheshire
- Population: 897 (2011)
- OS grid reference: SJ728504
- Civil parish: Hough and Chorlton
- Unitary authority: Cheshire East
- Ceremonial county: Cheshire
- Region: North West
- Country: England
- Sovereign state: United Kingdom
- Post town: CREWE
- Postcode district: CW2
- Dialling code: 01270
- Police: Cheshire
- Fire: Cheshire
- Ambulance: North West
- UK Parliament: Crewe and Nantwich

Chorlton is a village (at SJ728504) and former civil parish, now in the parish of Hough and Chorlton, in the unitary authority area of Cheshire East and the ceremonial county of Cheshire, England. The village lies 4 miles (6.4 km) to the south east of Crewe. Nearby villages include Hough, Shavington, Weston and Wybunbury in Cheshire and Betley in Staffordshire. In 2011 the parish had a population of 897.

== History ==
The area was agricultural, with a roughly equal mix of dairy and arable land in the 19th century. In 1848, it had a population of 141.

The local landowners were the Delves Broughton family.

Chorlton Methodist Chapel, a red-brick former Wesleyan Methodist church on Chorlton Lane, closed in 2018.

== Governance ==
Chorlton is administered by Hough & Chorlton Parish Council jointly with the adjacent parish of Hough. From 1974, the civil parish was served by Crewe and Nantwich Borough Council, which was succeeded on 1 April 2009 by the new unitary authority of Cheshire East. Chorlton falls in the parliamentary constituency of Crewe and Nantwich, which has been represented by Kieran Mullan since 2019, after being represented by Laura Smith (2017–19), Edward Timpson (2008–17) and Gwyneth Dunwoody (1983–2008).

Chorlton was formerly a township in the parish of Wybunbury, from 1866 Chorlton was a civil parish in its own right, on 1 April 2023 the parish was abolished to form "Hough and Chorlton".

== Geography and transport ==
The civil parish had an area of 377.13 hectares (931.9 acres). The area is undulating, sloping gently upwards to the south and east, with an average elevation of around 65 metres (213 ft) and a high point above 80 metres (260 ft) in the south east, around West Heath. Outside Chorlton village, the land use is predominantly agricultural, with several farms including Chorlton Bank Farm, Heath Farm, Jubilee Farm and West Heath Farm. Several minor watercourses run through the parish, including Mere Gutter and Swill Brook, and numerous small meres and ponds are scattered across the area. There are a few small areas of woodland.

The Crewe-to-Stafford railway line runs north west to south east through the village, originally built as the Liverpool and Birmingham Railway; there are no stations within Chorlton.

Chorlton Lane/Waybutt Lane runs broadly north–south from a T-junction at the northern boundary to Chorlton village; south of the village, the lane turns to run eastwards, and connects to the A531 just beyond the parish boundary in Staffordshire. Another lane runs westwards from the T-junction through the north of the parish to the village of Hough. The Crewe and Nantwich Circular Walk and South Cheshire Way long-distance footpaths cut through the north of the parish; the route of both follows part of Chorlton Lane and then crosses the railway at a footbridge near Heath Farm.

== Demography ==
According to the 2001 census, the parish had a population of 113, increasing to 897 in 338 households at the 2011 census. The historical population figures are 106 (1801), 114 (1851), 79 (1901) and 78 (1951).

== Landmarks ==
The parish contains one structure designated by English Heritage as a listed building. This is Basford Bridge Cottage, a timber-framed and brick building dating from the 17th century. The cottage is listed at Grade II, the lowest of the three grades of listing, which is applied to "buildings of national importance and special interest".

== Education ==
There are no educational facilities in Chorlton. The civil parish falls within the catchment area of Shavington Academy; most falls within the catchment area of Weston Village Primary School, but the western part is in that of Shavington Primary School.
