= Wybunbury Moss =

British nature reserve

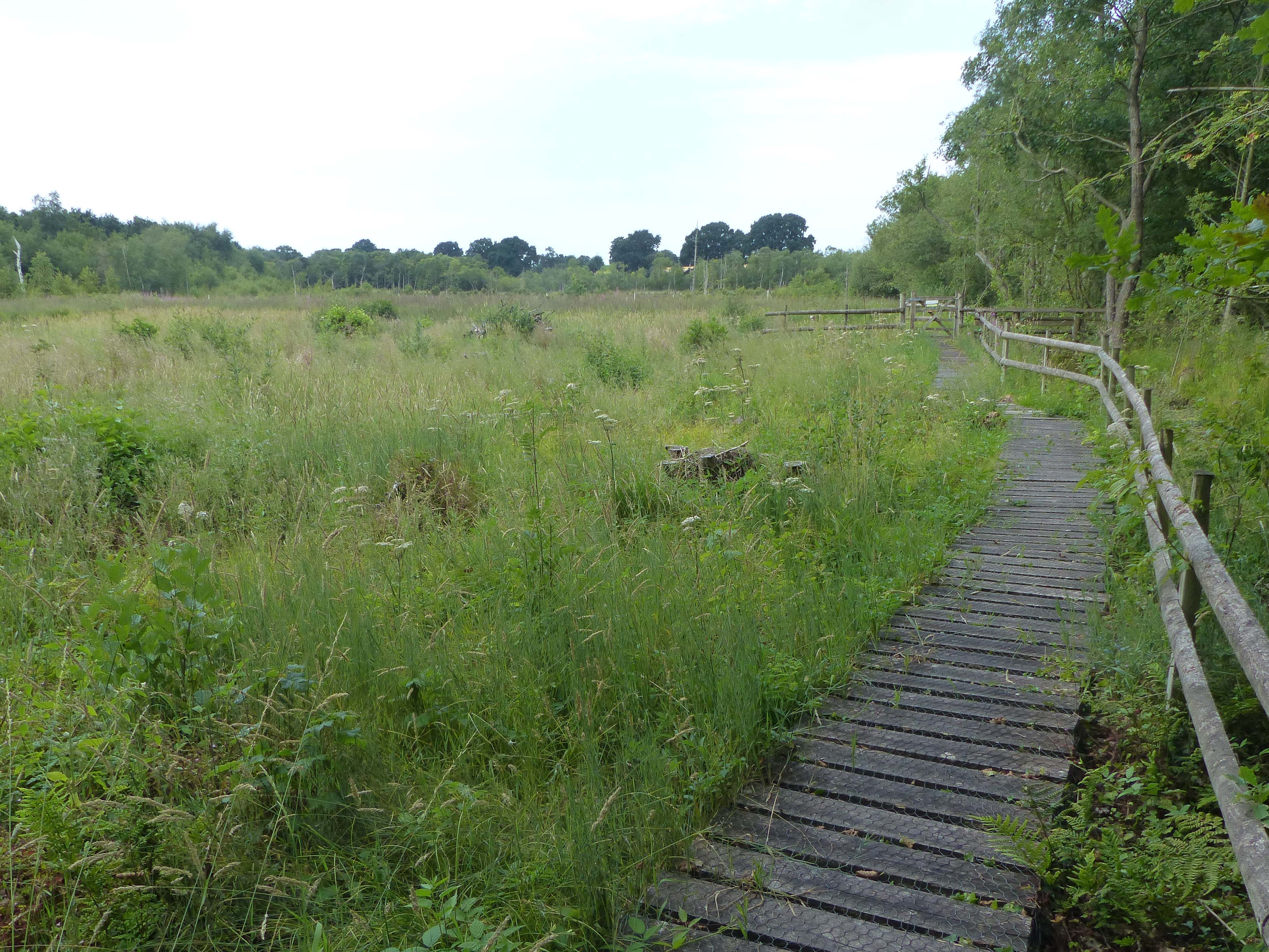
- Boardwalk towards the centre of Wybunbury Moss

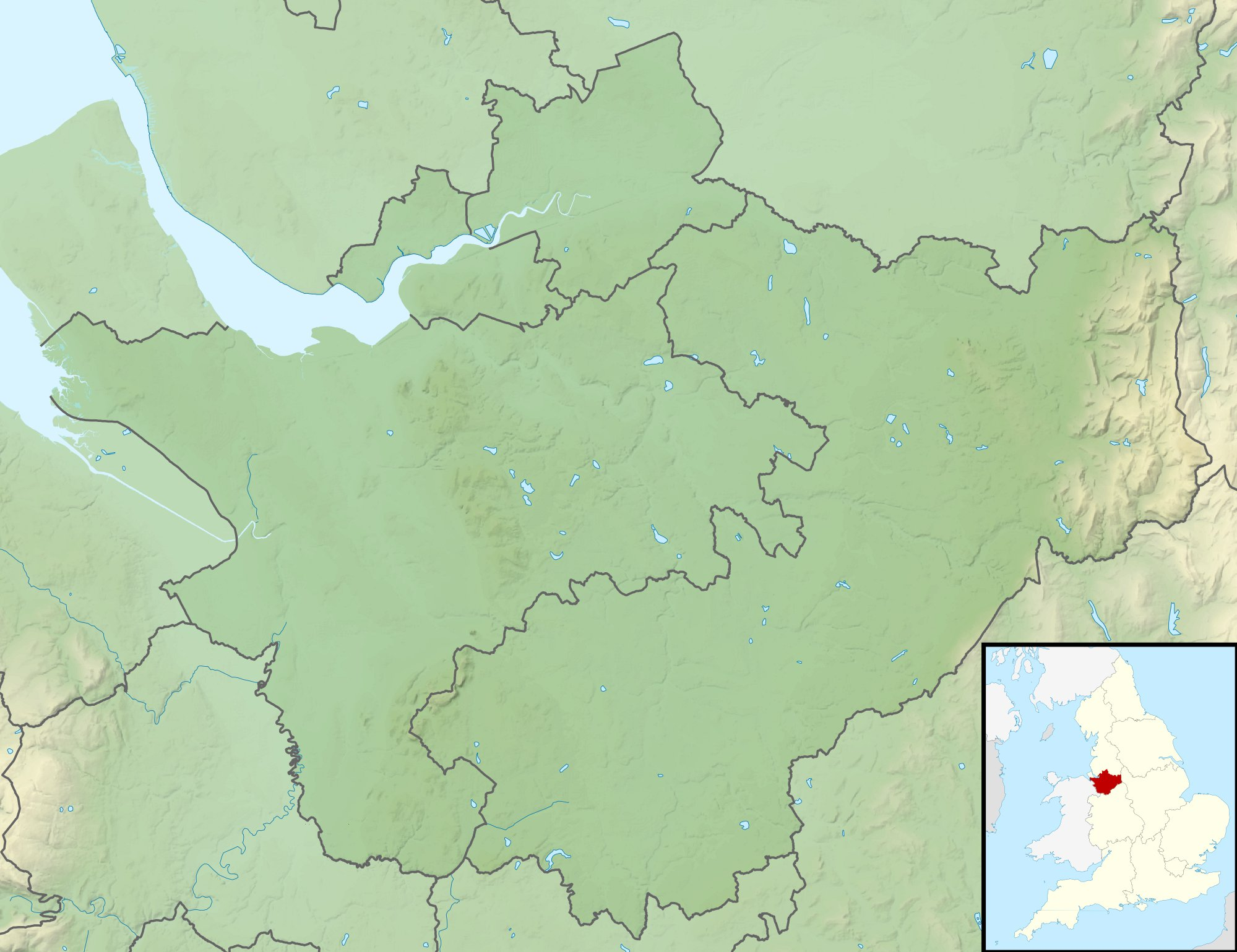
- Location within Cheshire
- Location: Cheshire
- Nearest town: Crewe
- Coordinates: 53.048°N 2.454°W
- Area: 16.5 ha (41 acres)
- Elevation: 48 metres (157 ft)
- Designation: National Nature Reserve; Site of Special Scientific Interest
- Designated: 1955
- Governing body: Natural England
- Owner: Natural England

Wybunbury Moss is a National Nature Reserve (NNR) and Site of Special Scientific Interest (SSSI) near the village of Wybunbury in Cheshire, England. It is a raised lowland bog, and a rare British example of a schwingmoor and a 'subsidence mire' (only two other British examples of the latter exist: Brookhouse Moss SSSI between Congleton and Sandbach, also in Cheshire, and Chartley Moss NNR in Staffordshire).

The site was first notified as an SSSI in 1951, and designated as an NNR in 1955, with further acquisitions added to the protected area in 1957 and 2009. It is owned and managed by Natural England.

== Habitat and species ==
The most important part of the site is a central schwingmoor, a peat bog, in places only a metre thick, floating on a water-filled basin over 12 metres (39 ft) deep. This may have occurred because of subsidence of salt-bearing rocks below the site, also the cause of undermining of the nearby Wybunbury Tower, which leans from the vertical and has required underpinning.

The floating part of the bog is dominated by Sphagnum mosses and common cotton-grass, with cranberry, cross-leaved heath and round-leaved sundew also present.

The reserve is important for its invertebrates, which include 95% of the British population of the ten-spotted pot beetle, Cryptocephalus decemmaculatus.

== Access ==
There are no public rights of way within the nature reserve, but a permitted wildlife walk leaves a public footpath north of Wybunbury Tower, running west over boardwalks towards the centre of the reserve, before heading north through woodland to rejoin the footpath network south of Cockshades Farm. The central, wettest part of the moss is not publicly accessible for safety and conservation reasons and can only be visited by permit-holders or by arrangement with Natural England.

== Folklore ==
The Moss is the setting for the children's book Nellie Longarms Will Get You... If You Don't Watch Out, by John Bailey and Rose Quigley. In English folklore, the moss is also said to be the home to a headless horseman and 'Ginny Greenteeth'.

== See also ==
- List of Sites of Special Scientific Interest in Cheshire
