= Onward Homes =

English housing association

Onward (formerly Symphony Housing Group) is a housing association and affordable housing provider operating in North West England and based in Liverpool.

Onward was formed as a merger in 2018 of five smaller associations - Contour Homes, Liverpool Housing Trust, Ribble Valley Homes, Hyndburn Homes and Peak Valley Housing Association. At that time it had about 800 staff and had plans to build more than 1,600 new homes over the next five years. Onward now manages 35,000 properties.

== Operational information ==
Bronwen Rapley is the Chief Executive. Rob Loughenbury, former campaign manager for the Conservative Party, was appointed director of strategy in 2020 with a brief to contribute to the regional plans to ‘build back better’ in the wake of the coronavirus pandemic, both as a social landlord and a housebuilder working across Liverpool, Manchester and Cheshire.

In 2020, Onward moved its Liverpool headquarters to the new Watson Building Renshaw Street. It also works from offices in Christie Fields in Manchester.

It got an A1 credit rating with a ‘stable’ outlook from ratings agency Moody's Investors Service in February 2021.

== Complaints and safety concerns ==
Complaints to the Housing Ombudsman about the organisation increased from 35 and 39 in 2017/18 and 2018/19 respectively, to 141 in 2019/20. The biggest growth was ‘property condition’ – the ombudsman’s umbrella term for repairs and maintenance issues. Onward Homes attributed the growth to their merger and a change in the repair contract.

Radon testing kits from Public Health England were supplied to 581 properties in Merseyside which are "located within a radon area" in 2020 in case remedial works were required.

In December 2020, Onward was fined £80,000 for breaches of the Control of Vibration at Work Regulations 2005 after four employees developed hand arm vibration syndrome from using vibrating power tools regularly. The company pleaded guilty.

There were complaints about how the firm dealt with reports of rat infestation at its properties in Rishton in 2020. A family in Fairfield, Liverpool abandoned their property and were given temporary accommodation by the council when it was infested with mice. Onward said pest control was usually "the responsibility of the tenant" and claimed the family had "been unwilling to allow access to the property".

A tenant in Toxteth claimed that his flat was left to rot despite frequent complaints about leaking sewage and damp which caused his ceiling to collapse. He accused Onward Homes of behaviour in a 'patronising' way towards him and that conditions in his flat 'ripped [him] apart'. They put him in temporary accommodation while his flat was repaired.

== Schemes and partnerships ==
It received an award for "Best Application of Tech in the Public Sector" in December 2020. It conducted a rapid automated telephone survey of its tenants to identify the most vulnerable. 91% confirmed they were OK and 1,698 asked for assistance. It supports the East Lancashire Homeless Families project and the Speke Up project.

== Developments ==
In 2020 it proposed to build a playground with ‘state of the art’ equipment in Hattersley on a former bowling green. This was part of the wider regeneration of the estate by a partnership between Tameside Council, Onward Homes and Homes England.

As of 2020 Onward Homes was developing a 450-home scheme in Basford, Cheshire. 123 properties were to be designated as affordable and the remainder for sale. This site was designated a strategic location for housing in the Cheshire East Local Plan, part of Cheshire East Council's plan for 850 homes in the village with a new local centre, including a primary school, shops and community centre, supported by a £2.2 million Homes England grant with investments of £4.5 million for road improvements, £1.5 million towards a new local primary school and £670,000 for new bus services, cycle lanes and pedestrian routes. They say "Onward is laying the foundations for a new community where individuals, couples and families can achieve their housing aspirations, from home ownership to affordable rent."

Its 2020 project in Great Harwood is for 40 houses, all available at affordable rent, and backed by a £1.56m grant from Homes England. In Wincham it is planning 98 detached, semi-detached and mews-style houses. 40% of the site will be developed, with the remaining 60% for use as public open space, an attenuation zone, and the retention of existing natural habitats and open areas. 21 one-bedroom apartments and six two-bedroom apartments on three storeys are under construction in Whitefield, Greater Manchester.

A 58-home scheme in Runcorn was left half-finished in October 2020 following the collapse of the building contractor Cruden. Anwyl Construction were engaged to make to site safe and complete the works. The 119 units have a mix of two, three-and four-bedroom homes in a community identified as needing a boost to the supply of homes available for shared ownership and affordable rent.

== See also ==
- Public housing in the United Kingdom
