= Willaston Hall =

Country house in Willaston, Cheshire, England

Coordinates: 53.06906°N 2.48822°W

Willaston Hall is a country house in the village of Willaston, near Nantwich, in the unitary authority of Cheshire East, England.

It was built for John Bayley in about 1700, and re-fronted for him in 1737. Wings were added to the house in 1833 and in 1838. It is constructed in red brick with painted ashlar dressings and a tiled roof. The central block has two storeys and an attic, and is in three bays. At its corners are chamfered quoins. Four steps lead up to a door with a stone surround and a pediment. The lateral wings have two storeys and a single bay. The parapet of the house is surmounted by urns. De Figueirdo and Treuherz express the opinion that the best room in the house, dating from 1737, is to the right of the entrance. This contains a fireplace with "two homely maidens, Night and Day, one with eyes closed, the other open, each with one hand cupping an ample breast, support the mantel, and in the centre is the head of Apollo within a sunburst". The house is recorded in the National Heritage List for England as a designated Grade II* listed building.

== See also ==
- Grade II* listed buildings in Cheshire East
