= Grindley Brook =

Village in Shropshire, England

Coordinates: 52.982°N 2.711°W

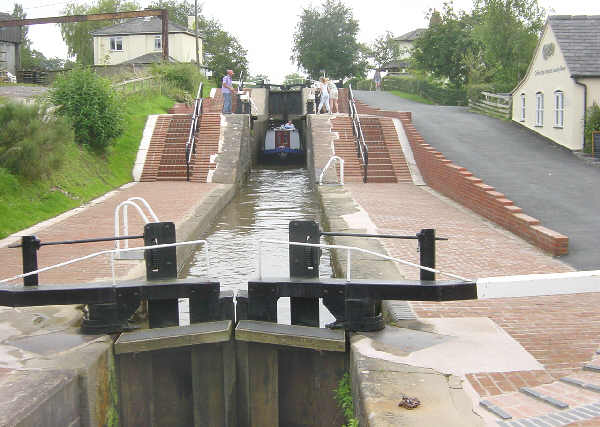
- Grindley Brook lock staircase

- Location within Shropshire
- OS grid reference: SJ523429
- Civil parish: Whitchurch Urban
- Unitary authority: Shropshire
- Ceremonial county: Shropshire
- Region: West Midlands
- Country: England
- Sovereign state: United Kingdom
- Post town: WHITCHURCH
- Postcode district: SY13
- Dialling code: 01948
- Police: West Mercia
- Fire: Shropshire
- Ambulance: West Midlands
- UK Parliament: North Shropshire

Grindley Brook is a small village in Shropshire, England, on the A41 trunk road 2 miles (3.2 km) north west of the market town of Whitchurch. It is the most northerly settlement in Shropshire and borders directly onto Cheshire, and is within the civil parish of Whitchurch Urban.

It is also the name of a small brook which flows past the village and marks the Cheshire-Shropshire border at this point.

== Geography ==
The Llangollen branch of the Shropshire Union Canal passes through the village, and it is here that the canal descends to the Cheshire Plain. Three locks rise in a staircase near the village, and there are three other locks as the canal passes through the village.

The village is the starting point for four long-distance footpaths: the Maelor, Shropshire and South Cheshire Ways and the Sandstone Trail, and several others run through the village, including the Marches Way.
