= Maelor Way =

24-mile footpath in Wales and England

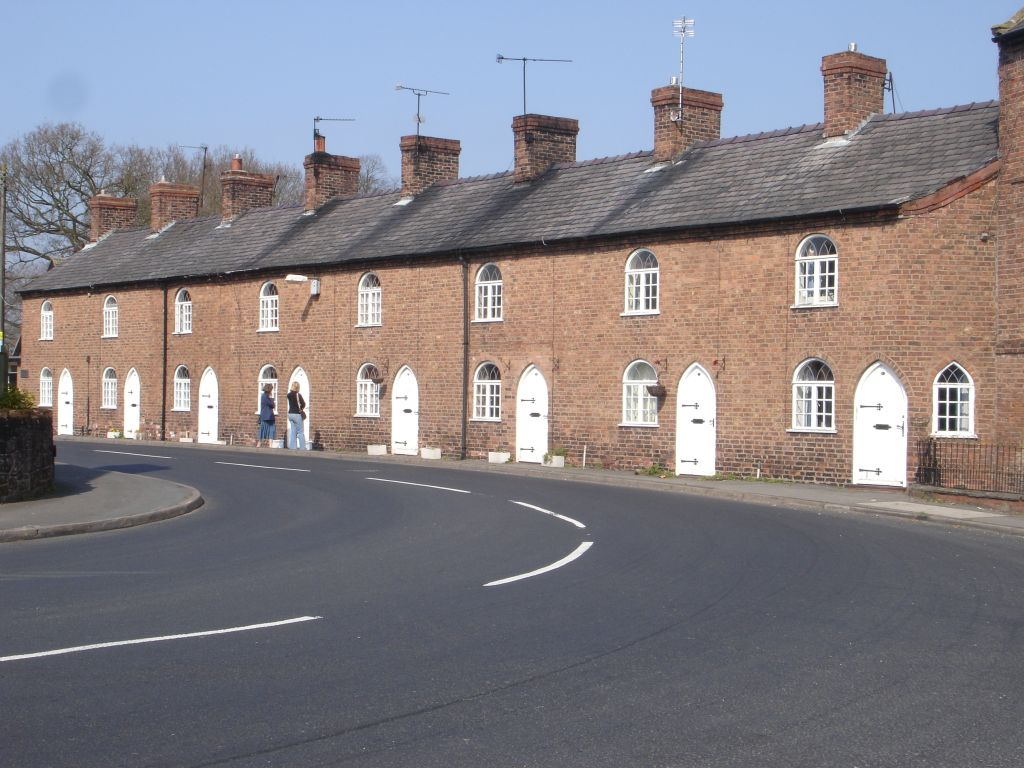
- The trail passes through Overton-on-Dee
- Length: 24 mi (39 km)
- Location: Wales & Midlands, England
- Trailheads: Bronygarth; 52.925°N 3.090°W; Grindley Brook; 52.982°N 2.711°W
- Use: Hiking
- Season: All year

Maelor Way is a key long distance footpath, running 38 kilometres / 24 miles from the Offa's Dyke Path National Trail at Bronygarth to the Shropshire Way, Sandstone Trail, Llangollen Canal, South Cheshire Way, and the Marches Way all at Grindley Brook near Whitchurch.

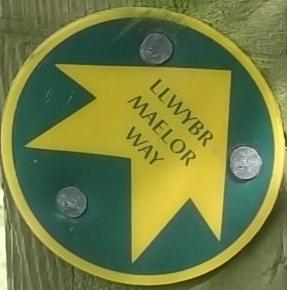
Maelor Way Marker

== The route ==
Most of the way is easy walking across pleasant meadows and through woodlands, mostly in the county borough of Wrexham in Wales, but partly in Cheshire and Shropshire in England.

Many parts of the walk follow waterways: Grindley Brook, the Llangollen Canal, the River Dee, and the river Ceiriog in the Ceiriog Valley.

The way also passes through towns and villages: Overton-on-Dee with its ancient yew trees, one of the Seven Wonders of Wales; Penley, where the wartime Polish Army Hospital once boosted the population threefold, Hanmer, situated on the peaceful mere which gave the village and its local aristocracy, the Hanmer family, their name, Chirk featuring Chirk Castle and Thomas Telfords Chirk Aqueduct.
