= Willaston, Cheshire East =

Village in Cheshire, England

Coordinates: 53.082°N 2.479°W

Willaston
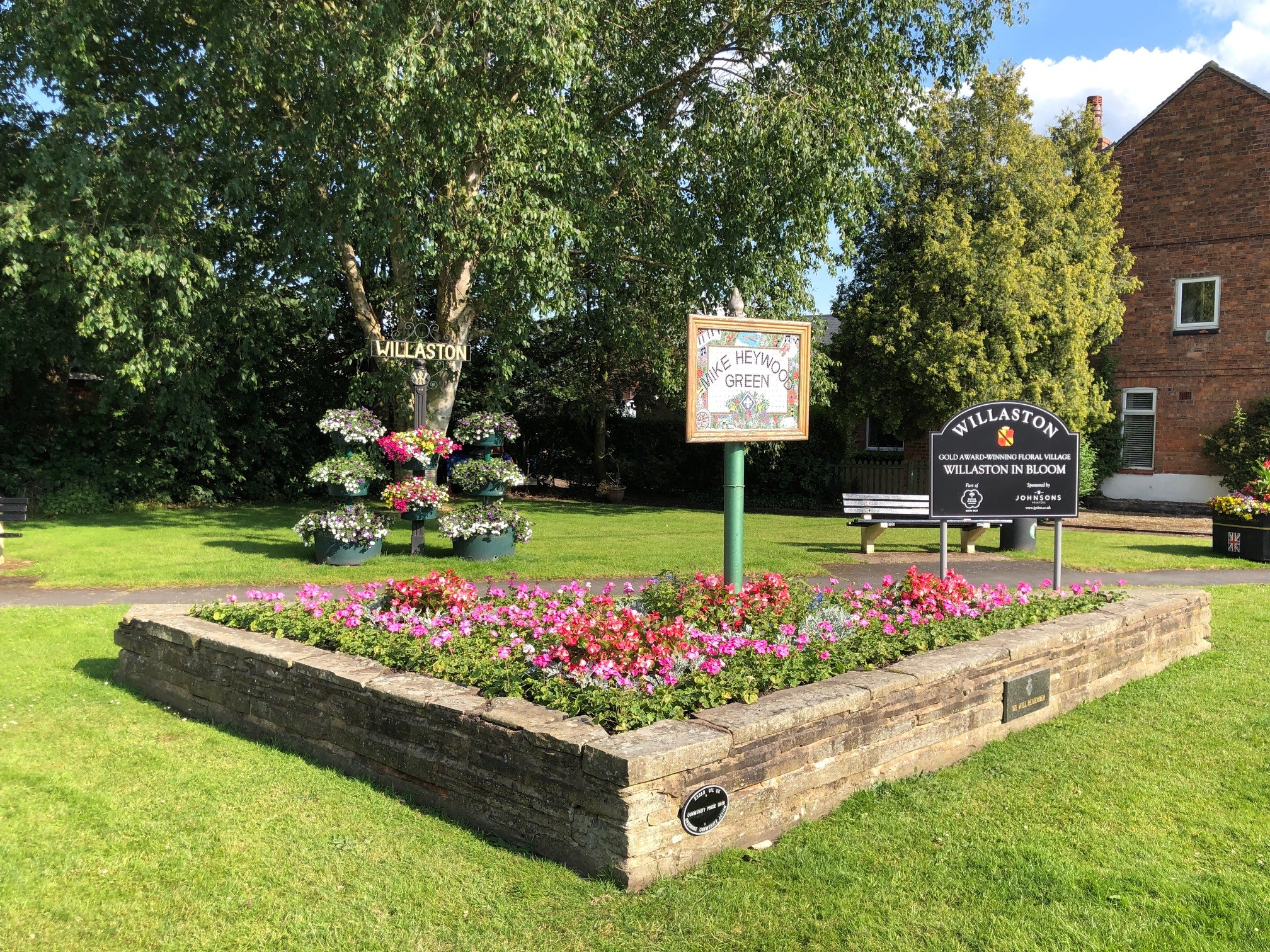
- Mike Heywood Green

- Location within the United Kingdom
- Population: 3,104 (2011 census)
- OS grid reference: SJ677524
- Civil parish: Willaston
- Unitary authority: Cheshire East
- Ceremonial county: Cheshire
- Country: England
- Sovereign state: United Kingdom
- Post town: Nantwich
- Postcode district: CW5
- Dialling code: 01270
- UK Parliament: Crewe and Nantwich

Willaston is a civil parish and village in the unitary authority of Cheshire East, Cheshire, England. It had a population of 3,104 at the 2011 census, up from 2,973 in 2001. It lies 2 miles (3.2 km) east of Nantwich, 3 miles (4.8 km) south-west of Crewe and 7 miles (11.3 km) from junction 16 of the M6 motorway.

== History ==
Willaston is believed to have taken its name from an ancient farmstead known as Wiglaf's tun. Like other English villages, the name has been changed many times over the centuries. This is due to the neighbouring parish of Wistaston having a similar sounding name. To add confusion, Willaston was once ecclesiastically divided between the neighbouring communities of Nantwich and Wybunbury.

Whilst there are at least two other villages called Willaston, the earliest documentary evidence relating to Willaston in this part of Cheshire can be found in the Domesday survey of 1086, where is it referred to as Wilavestune, owned by a 'free man' named Ulviet. A few years after the Norman conquest the title passed to Willam Malbank. The manor of Wilvastune remained in the Malbank family for several generations before ownership transferred to the Chanu family in the 13th century.

At this time, Willaston was a remote, sparsely populated community with no village centre. Nevertheless, it covered a much larger area than it does today, stretching from Newcastle Road and London Road, Nantwich in the south, along Millstone Lane and as far as the ancient grazing land of Beam Heath in the north. These boundaries did not change until 1936, when local government decided to transfer some of Willaston's land to the expanding communities of Nantwich and Stapeley. In 1553, the manor of Willaston was bought by Richard Sneyd, Recorder of Chester. The Sneyd family lived at Keele Hall in Staffordshire and were the major landowners in Willaston until the middle of the 19th century.

Although Willaston had a number of farmsteads in the Middle Ages, most of the surrounding landscape was uncultivated. However, this began to change as more common land fell into private ownership during the late 18th and early 19th centuries. The process (known as 'enclosure') brought major changes to rural communities like Willaston, as individual plots of land were fenced off and used for arable farming, meadows and the grazing of livestock. The Sneyd family were absentee landlords but they owned most of the lands in Willaston from 1533 to the late 19th century.

The medieval moated site of the Chanu family was lost during the construction of the Nantwich by-pass in 1989. It was situated to the south-east of the Old Willaston Board School on land now owned by Cheerbrook Farm.

== Governance ==
From 1974 to 2009, the area was administered Crewe and Nantwich borough council. Since its abolition on 1 April 2009, the civil parish has been administered by the unitary authority of Cheshire East.

Willaston Parish Council was established in 1894 and is its first tier of local government. It is responsible for the management of the Lettie Spencer playing field, the war memorial on Colleys Lane, the village allotments on Crewe Road, the Spinney off Coppice Road and Mike Heywood Green. The council is made up of 12 members from two wards, who represent the interests of all Willaston residents. The parish council is a planning consultee and author of the Willaston neighbourhood plan which informs local planning decisions.

The village lies in the parliamentary constituency of Crewe and Nantwich, which has been represented by Connor Naismith since the 2024 general election.

== Amenities ==
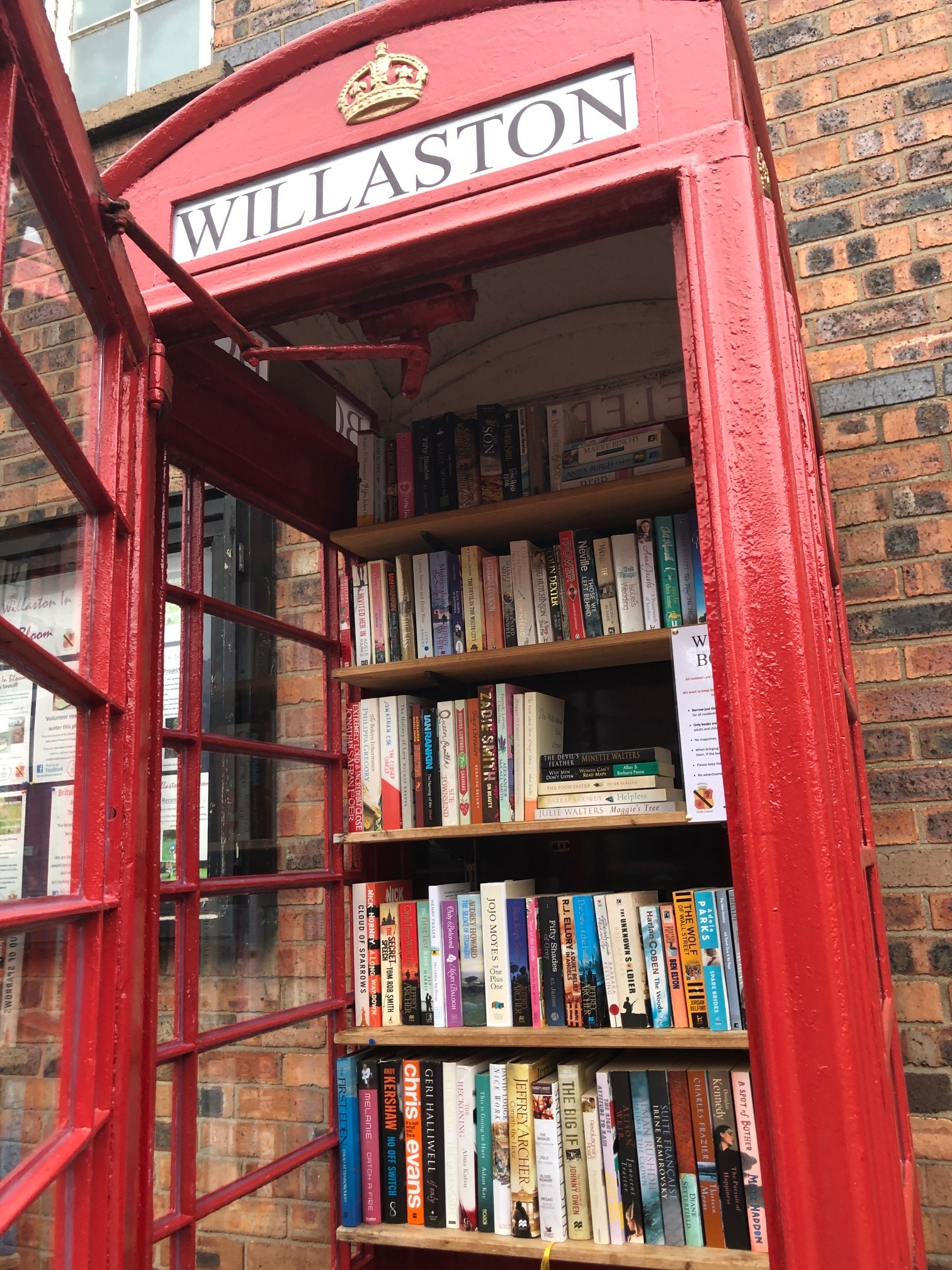
Former K6 telephone box, converted into a book exchange

The village centre of Willaston has two public houses: The Lamb and The Nag's Head. Another pub, The Peacock, is situated to the north-west of the village centre, on the A534 Crewe Road; alongside it is a Premier Inn hotel.

A social club has several sports teams, including pool, snooker, seven-a-side football, darts and dominoes.

The village also has a fish and chip shop (Mick the chips) and hairdressing salons. Other local businesses provide employment, including Scanlans and SJB Steel; at the edge of the village is a farm shop, Cheerbrook, on Newcastle Road; a plant nursery and garden centre is located on Crewe Road.

Willaston Primary School is the only education establishment in the village. For children of pre-school age, there is an Ofsted-registered playgroup in the village.

A K6 telephone box in Wistaston Road has been in place since the late 1940s. Decommissioned by British Telecom in 2010, it was then purchased by Willaston Parish Council and turned into a book exchange, the 'book box'. A restoration was carried out in September 2019.

The Willaston WI sign is located on Mike Heywood Green on Wistaston Road; it was gifted by the local branch of the Women's Institute in November 1970.

== Local events ==
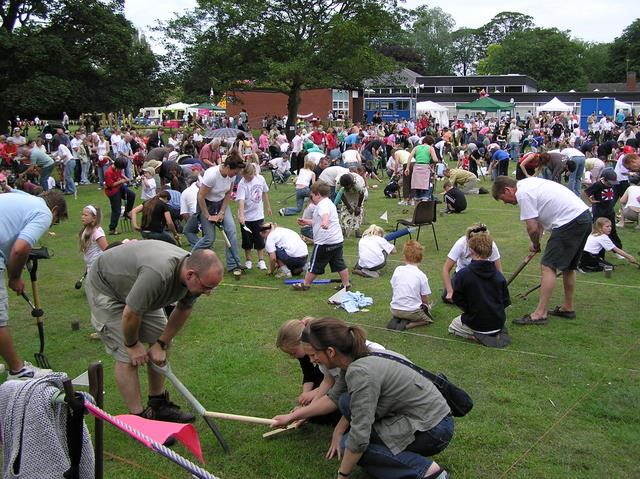
The World Worm Charming Championships have been held in Willaston since 1980

One of the major events in Willaston is the World Worm Charming Championships. It was started in 1980 by John Bailey and the first event was won with a total of 511 worms by Tom Shufflebotham – a record that stood until 2009.

The event attracts many competitors from around the world. Celebrities that have taken part include Ben Fogle and Bob Carolgees; in 2008, contestants Paddy McGuinness and Rory McGrath filmed a slot for the series Rory and Paddy's Great British Adventure.

The 2008 championship was won by Mike and Claire Gaukroger with a total of 125 worms; the trophy for the heaviest worm went to Ray O'Grady and Steve Plant (4.6g).

In 2009, in particularly good conditions, three teams broke the previous world record of 511. Sophie and Matt Smith of Willaston claimed the title, with a total of 567 worms in 30 minutes.

== See also ==
- Willaston Hall
