= St Chad's Church, Wybunbury =

Coordinates: 53.0452°N 2.4488°W

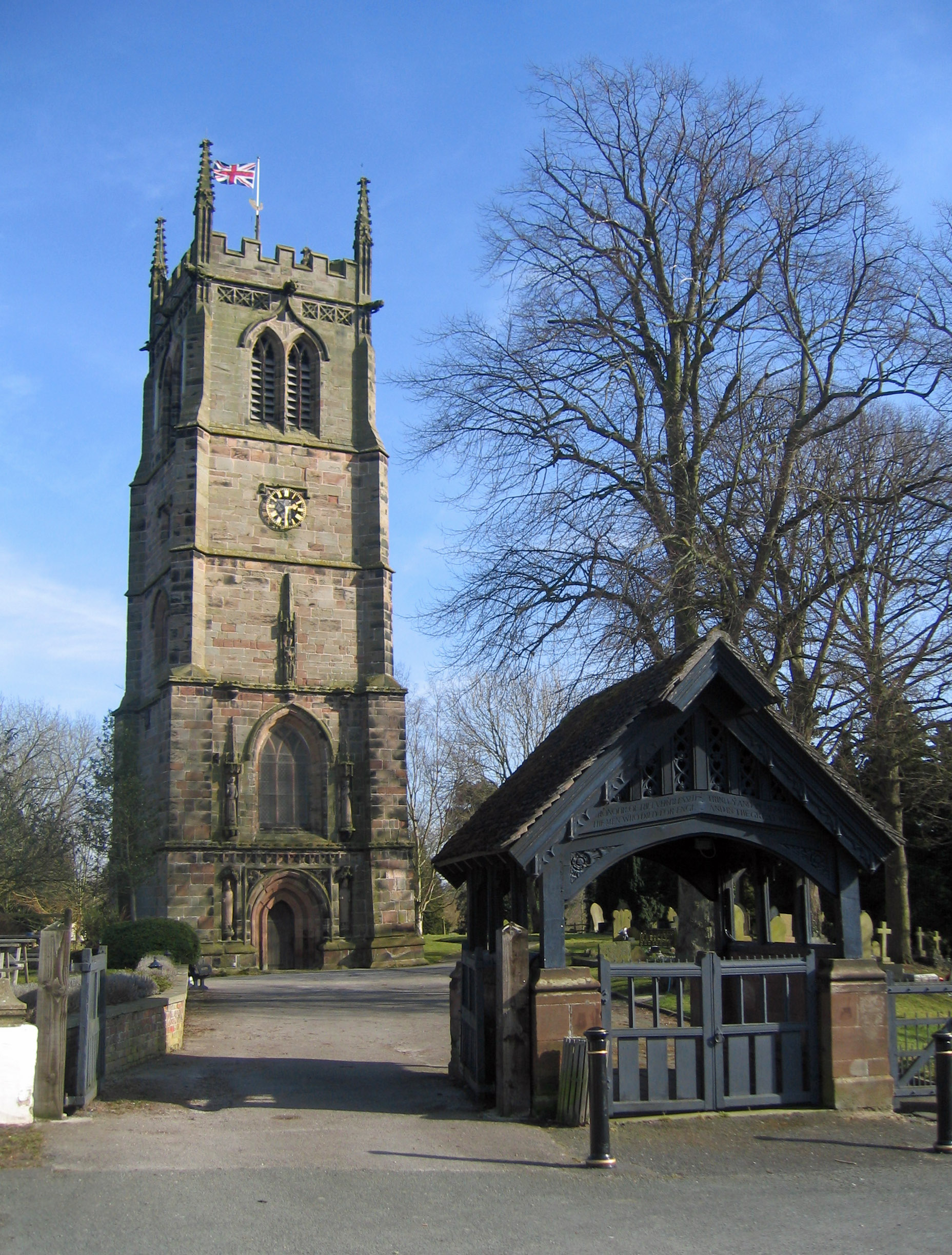
- Tower and lych gate of St Chad's Church, Wybunbury

- Location in Cheshire
- OS grid reference: SJ 700 499
- Location: Wybunbury, Cheshire
- Country: England
- Denomination: Anglican

Architecture
- Functional status: Demolished, other than the tower
- Heritage designation: Grade II*
- Designated: 12 January 1967
- Architectural type: Church tower
- Style: Gothic

Specifications
- Materials: Sandstone ashlar Lead roof

Wybunbury Tower is what remains of the building formerly known as St Chad's Church in the village of Wybunbury, Cheshire, England. The body of the original church has been demolished but the tower still stands. The tower is recorded in the National Heritage List for England as a designated Grade II* listed building. The site of the tower is a Scheduled Monument. The current St Chad's Church is located in a modern building on a different site in the village.

== History ==
The Domesday Book contains a reference to a priest in Wybunbury. The church was broken into in 1464, the cross was broken and valuables were stolen. The thieves were caught and hanged. The tower was built in the 15th century on the site of the earlier church. By 1750 its foundations were observed to be settling and the tower was beginning to lean. In the early 1790s the church was repaired or rebuilt. In 1833 the body of the church was demolished; James Trubshaw then straightened the tower by removing soil from the higher side and soaking the ground so that the tower settled back straight. He rebuilt the body of the church in a style loosely based on the previous building. This church was replaced in 1892–93 by a church designed by James Brooks, which in turn was demolished around 1976. The tower was saved from demolition by a group of villagers who formed the Wybunbury Tower Preservation Trust. The technique used by Trubshaw formed the basis of the method used in the 1990s to stabilise the Leaning Tower of Pisa.

As at least five and possibly more churches on this site have become unsafe and been demolished due to ground movement; the replacement church was built in 1978 on a site elsewhere in the village and contains several items from previous churches.

== Architecture ==
Only the tower now remains and Richards considers that it is one of the finest towers in Cheshire. It still leans to the north. It is built in sandstone ashlar with a lead roof. The tower is square and has five stages. The west doorway is deeply recessed and immediately above it is a window of three lights. On each side of the door and of the window are niches containing statues, possibly of bishops, while over the window is a fifth niche containing a statue of the Trinity. The fourth stage has a square wrought iron clock face. The fifth stage has two two-light belfry openings. The parapet is battlemented with crocketed pinnacles at the corners. The tower contains a ring of six bells which were cast in 1791 by John Rudhall.

== Other features ==
The lych gate still stands and it serves as a war memorial.

== See also ==
- Grade II* listed buildings in Cheshire East
- Listed buildings in Wybunbury
