= Listed buildings in Shavington cum Gresty =

Shavington cum Gresty is a civil parish in Cheshire East, England. It contains two buildings that are recorded in the National Heritage List for England as designated listed buildings, both of which are listed at Grade II. This grade is the lowest of the three gradings given to listed buildings and is applied to "buildings of national importance and special interest". Both the listed buildings are houses in the country outside the village of Shavington.

Name and location	Photograph	Date	Notes
Shavington Lodge; 53.06577°N 2.43436°W	—	Early 19th century	A brick farmhouse with stone dressings and a slate roof, it is in two storeys and has a symmetrical three-bay entrance front. In the centre is a cast iron porch in the shape of a Venetian window, behind which is a door with a fanlight. Most of the windows are sashes that have stone sills and flat arched heads with brick voussoirs. On the right side are three sets of French windows and a cast iron verandah.
Shavington Hall; 53.06739°N 2.43544°W	—	1877	A small country house in brick with sandstone dressings and a Welsh slate roof, in Tudor Revival style. It is in two connected ranges, the main wing to the west and the service wing to the east. The windows are mullioned or mullioned and transomed. Other features include gables, one of which is crow stepped, a Tudor arched doorway, and tall brick chimneys.
