= All Saints' Church, Weston, Cheshire =

Coordinates: 53.0667°N 2.4003°W

All Saints' Church, Weston
- West end of All Saints' Church, Weston

- Location in Cheshire
- OS grid reference: SJ 733 522
- Location: Main Road, Weston, Cheshire
- Country: England
- Denomination: Anglican
- Website: All Saints, Weston

History
- Status: Parish church

Architecture
- Functional status: Active
- Heritage designation: Grade II
- Designated: 5 September 1986
- Architect(s): Edward Lapidge (?); J. A. Atkinson (?)
- Architectural type: Church
- Style: Gothic Revival
- Groundbreaking: c. 1840
- Completed: 1893

Specifications
- Materials: Brick, ashlar dressings Tiled roof

Administration
- Province: York
- Diocese: Chester
- Archdeaconry: Macclesfield
- Deanery: Nantwich
- Parish: Weston

Clergy
- Vicar: Revd Rachael Griffiths

All Saints' Church is in Main Road, Weston, Cheshire, England. It is an active Anglican parish church in the deanery of Nantwich, the archdeaconry of Macclesfield, and the diocese of Chester. Its benefice is combined with that of St Mark, Shavington. The church is recorded in the National Heritage List for England as a designated Grade II listed building.

== History ==
All Saints' was built in about 1840, and the chancel was added in 1893. The original part of the church was probably designed by Edward Lapidge, and the chancel probably by J. A. Atkinson.

== Architecture ==
The church is constructed in red brick with ashlar dressings, and has a tiled roof. Its plan consists of a nave, a west porch, a chancel with an apsidal east end, and a northeast vestry. On the west gable is a single bellcote. Above the west porch is a triple lancet window, and over this is a roundel. On the corners of the church are buttresses; these are square in the lower parts and octagonal above. Along the sides of the church are four lancet windows. The chancel apse contains five windows, the central one with a gablet. Inside the church, the nave walls are plastered, and the chancel is lined with brown and yellow bricks. The chancel windows contain stained glass by Morris & Co. The central three windows date from 1924 and depict the Crucifixion flanked by the Virgin Mary and Saint John. The lateral windows of 1928 depict Saint Peter and Saint Paul.

== See also ==
- Listed buildings in Weston, Cheshire East
