= Listed buildings in Wybunbury =

Wybunbury is a civil parish in Cheshire East, England. It contains eight buildings that are recorded in the National Heritage List for England as designated listed buildings. Of these, one is listed at Grade II*, the middle of the three grades, and the others are at Grade II, the lowest grade. The parish contains the village of Wybunbury, and is otherwise rural. The listed buildings consist of houses, a school, a public house, a war memorial, and the tower of an otherwise demolished church.

== Key ==
Grade	Criteria
II*	Particularly important buildings of more than special interest
II	Buildings of national importance and special interest

== Buildings ==
Name and location	Photograph	Date	Notes	Grade
Tower, St Chad's Church; 53.04529°N 2.44886°W		15th century	The body of the church was demolished in about 1976, leaving the tower standing alone. It is built in sandstone with a lead roof, and is in Perpendicular style. In the middle of the 18th century the tower was found to be leaning, and in 1833 James Trubshaw attempted to straighten it, but it still leans to the north. The tower is 96 feet (29.3 m) high, is in five stages, and has a battlemented parapet with crocketed pinnacles. The land on which the tower and former church stands are a scheduled monument.	II*
Swan Inn; 53.04549°N 2.44973°W		17th century	A public house that was altered and extended in the 19th and 20th centuries. It is built in pebbledashed brick and has a tiled roof. The building is in two storeys, and has a three-bay front. The left bay contains a two-storey bow with a seven-light window in each floor. The middle bay contains a lean-to porch, and the windows are sashes.	II
Rose Cottage; 53.04555°N 2.44994°W		Late 17th century	The cottage is basically timber-framed with brick infill, and there are later alterations and additions in brick. It has a tiled roof. The windows are casements, those in the upper floor in gabled dormers.	II
Delves School; 53.04083°N 2.44866°W		1822	The school is in brick with stone dressings and has a tiled roof. It is in a single storey, and the original part has a symmetrical five-bay front. The bays are divided by pilasters. In the central bay is a doorway with a round-headed fanlight, and at the top is a stone pediment. The lateral bays each contain a round-headed window. On each side of the original building are extensions.	II
Grove House; 53.04949°N 2.46531°W	—	Early 19th century	A brick farmhouse with a tiled roof in two storeys. It has a symmetrical three-bay front. In the centre is a flat-roofed porch with an entablature carried on columns, behind which is a doorway with a rectangular fanlight. The windows are sashes with stone sills and wedge lintels. On the left is a single-bay extension.	II
The Poplars; 53.05047°N 2.46433°W	—	Early 19th century	A brick farmhouse with a tiled roof in three storeys. It has a symmetrical three-bay front, the central bay projecting slightly. In the centre is a flat-roofed porch carried on Tuscan columns. The windows are sashes with stone sills and wedge lintels.	II
The Cliffe; 53.04023°N 2.44190°W		Mid- to late 19th century	A brick house with applied timber-framing in two storeys with an attic. To the right of the entrance front is a gabled porch containing an archway with Jacobean pilasters topped by Ionic capitals. On the front is a jettied gable with moulded bargeboards and containing an oriel window. To the left of this is a two-storey canted bay window. The windows contain lozenge glazing.	II
War memorial 53.04563°N 2.45427°W		1921	The war memorial is in the form of a Calvary cross. It is in sandstone, and consists of a plinth with a tapering shaft, on which is a figure of Christ in metal. The plinth is inscribed, and also carries the names of those who were lost in the two World Wars.	II
