= South Cheshire Way =

34-mile footpath in Cheshire, England

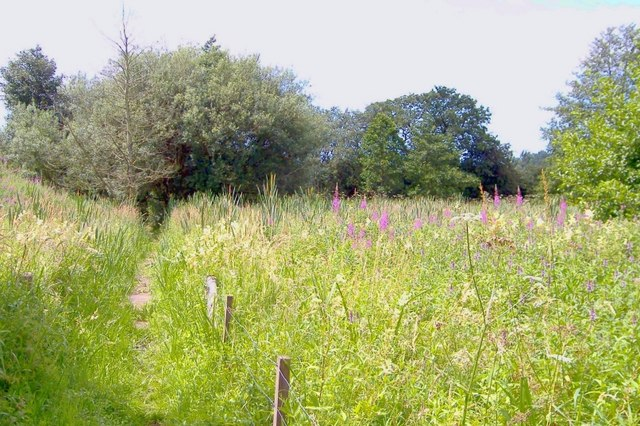
- South Cheshire Way near Crewe Green
- Length: 34 miles (55 km)
- Location: Cheshire, England
- Established: 1988
- Trailheads: Grindley Brook; Mow Cop
- Use: Hiking
- Elevation change: 2,123 feet (647 m)
- Highest point: Mow Cop, 1,050 ft (320 m)
- Difficulty: Easy

The South Cheshire Way is a 34-mile (55 km) long-distance footpath running east–west mainly through Cheshire, England, although parts lie in Shropshire and Staffordshire. The western section from Grindley Brook, near Whitchurch, runs through farmland; the eastern section from Mow Cop, near Biddulph, runs through low hills. The footpath is waymarked with black-and-yellow discs inscribed 'SCW'. It is covered by the Ordnance Survey Explorer series 257 and 268 maps, which denote it with a green lozenge.

The South Cheshire Way provides easy walking. The eastern terminus, Mow Cop, is the route's high point, at 1,050 feet (320 m), and there is 2,123 feet (647 m) of ascent in total. The path connects with several other long-distance paths, including the Maelor Way, the Staffordshire Way and the Sandstone and Gritstone Trails.

== History ==
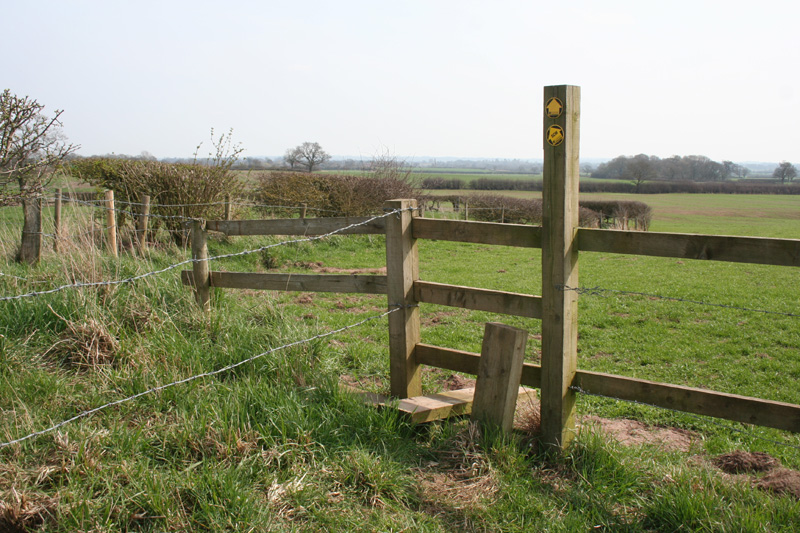
Stile near Mickley Hall, Broomhall, showing waymarker (bottom)

Jack Baker of the Mid-Cheshire Footpath Society originated the idea of the route towards the end of the 1970s. The society created the waymarked route over four years in the 1980s, with assistance from the Whitchurch Walkers and the local Ramblers Association, and support from the highways division of Cheshire County Council. The intention was to create a lowland route that was easy to walk, passed sites of historical interest, and was served by public houses. The footpath was formally opened on 17 September 1988 with ceremonies involving the mayors of Congleton and Crewe and Nantwich, and the chair of the North Shropshire District Council. The Mid-Cheshire Footpath Society published a printed guide to the route in 1988. In 1992, signposts matching the four other Mid-Cheshire Footpath Society's routes were erected at each terminus of the footpath by Cheshire County Council, partly financed by the society.

== Description ==
The route provides easy walking, predominantly on public footpaths with some stretches on minor roads. The western section from Grindley Brook runs through farmland; the eastern section from Mow Cop runs through low hills. The eastern terminus, Mow Cop, is the route's high point, at 1,050 feet (320 m), and there is 2,123 feet (647 m) of ascent in total. Much of the height gain occurs in the final stretch, from Ackers Crossing to Mow Cop, which climbs more than 660 feet (200 m) in 1.25 miles (2 km).

=== Route and landmarks ===
Starting from the western terminus (parentheses denote nearby landmarks, not on the direct route):

- Grindley Brook in Shropshire

- Grindley Brook locks

- Marbury

- Marbury Big Mere, St Michael's Church
- (Wrenbury)

- Aston

- Aston Mill, Aston House Farm, Yew Tree House, Bhurtpore Inn
- Shropshire Union Canal, (Hack Green Secret Nuclear Bunker)

- River Weaver

- Hankelow Hall

- Hankelow
- A51 by Lea Forge

- Lea Hall

- Weston

- Weston Hall, All Saints' Church
- Henbury Lee wetland
- Haslington Hall, (Hassall Hall)

- Thurlwood
- Little Moreton Hall (A34)

- Old Man of Mow rock

- Mow Cop; partly in Staffordshire

- Mow Cop Castle, a folly

Landmarks and sights of interest

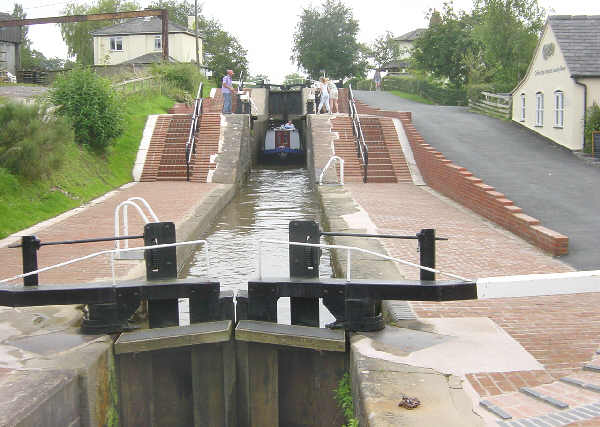
Grindley Brook locks

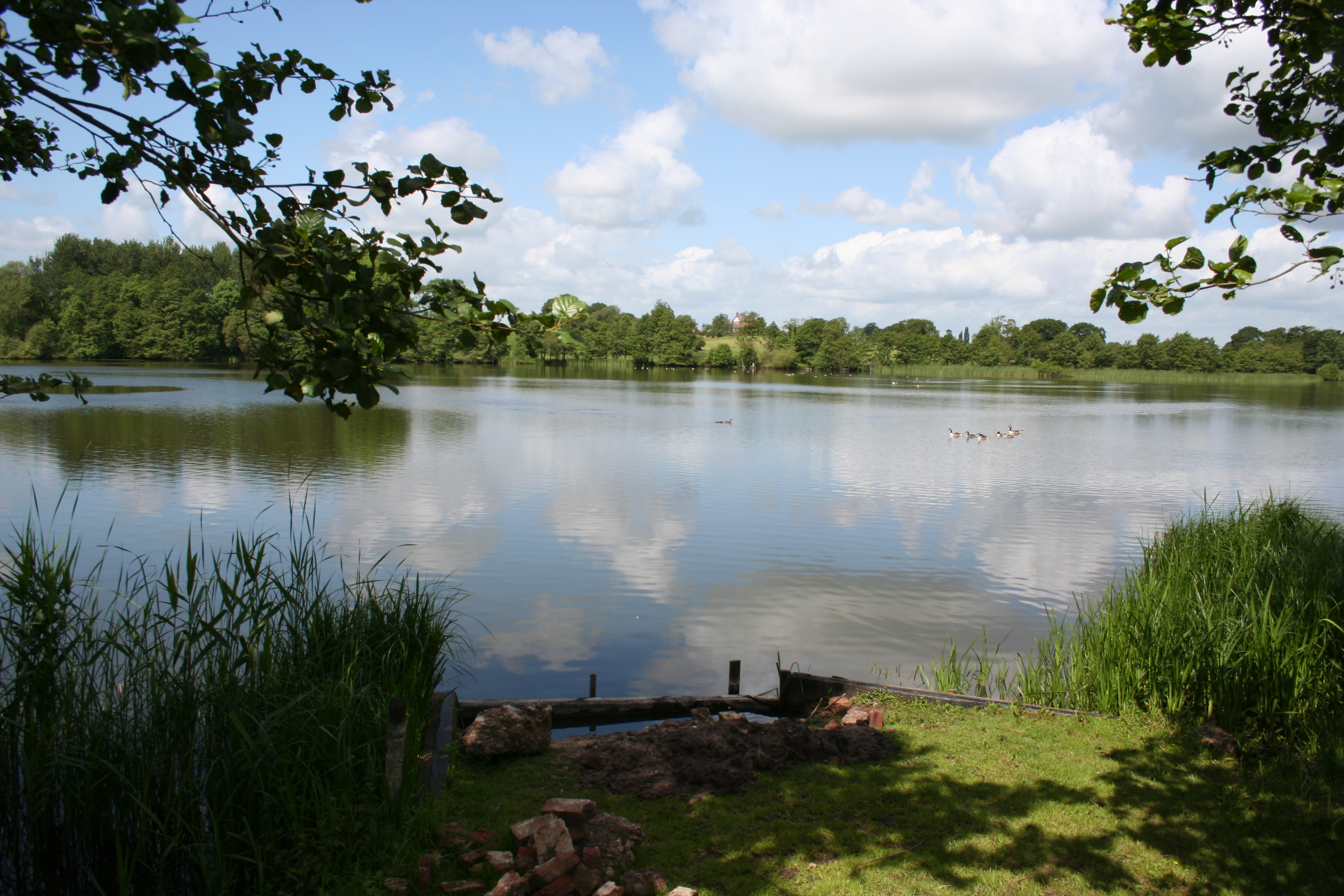
Marbury Big Mere

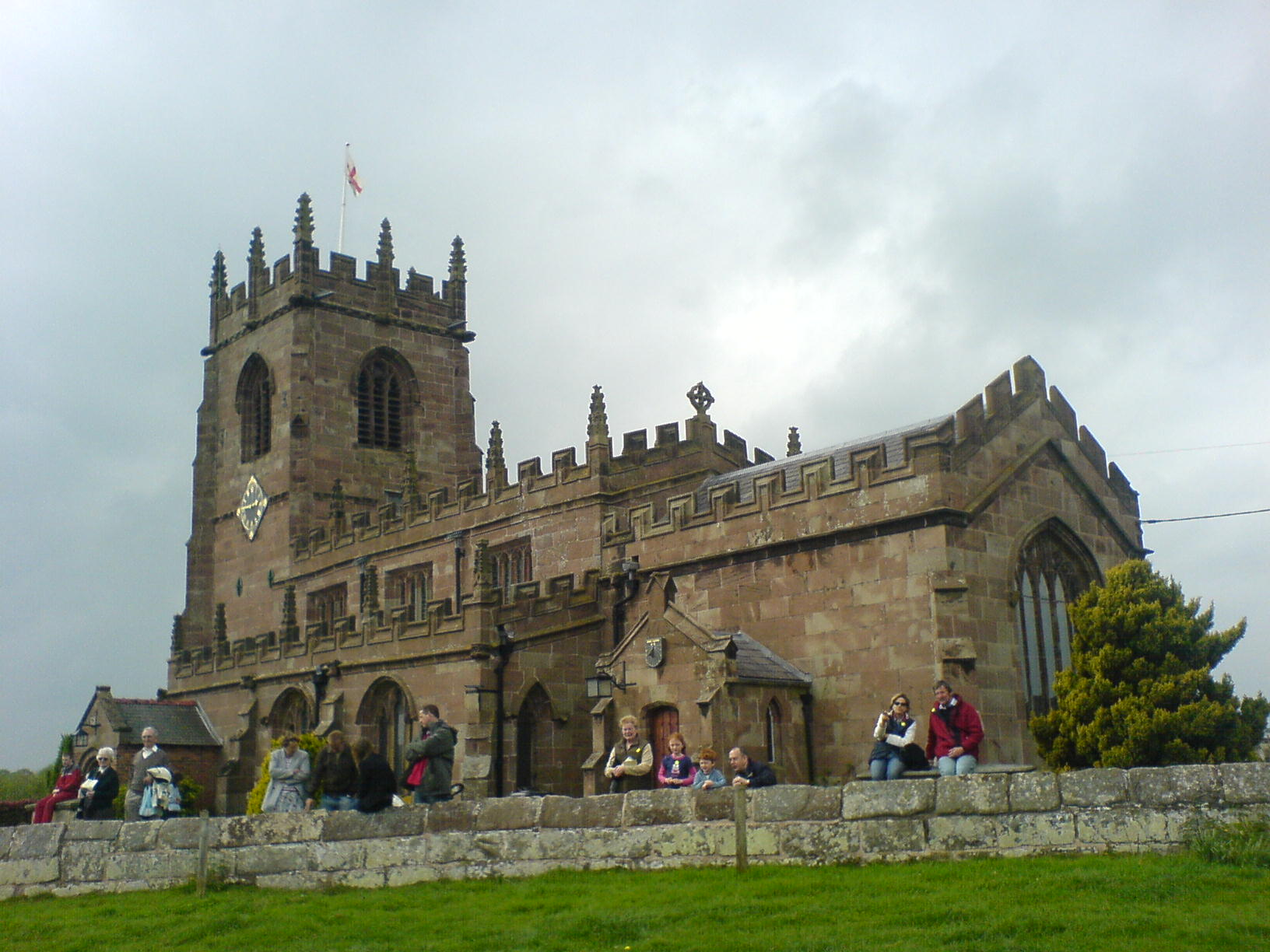
St Michael's, Marbury

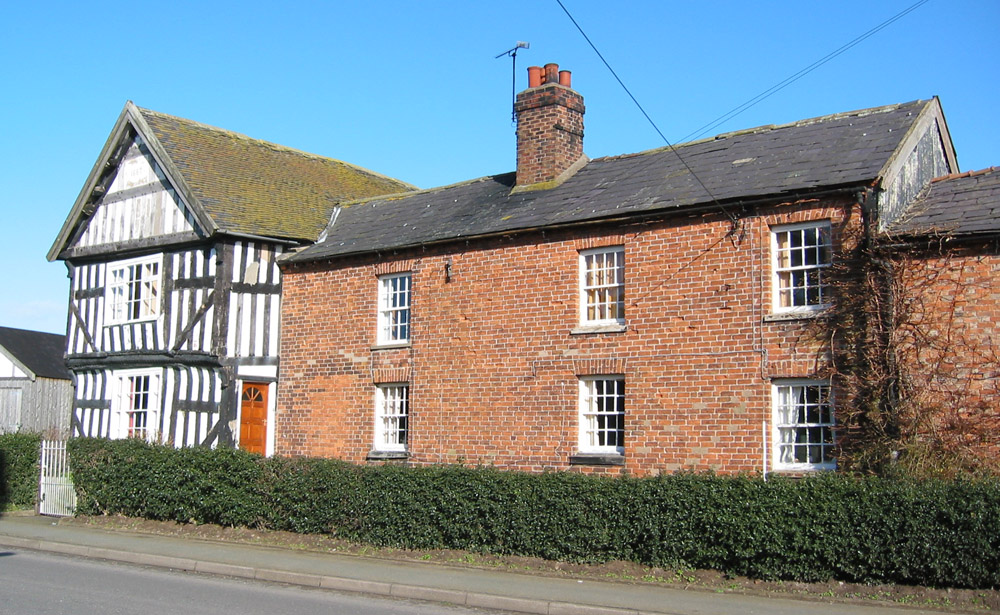
Aston House Farm

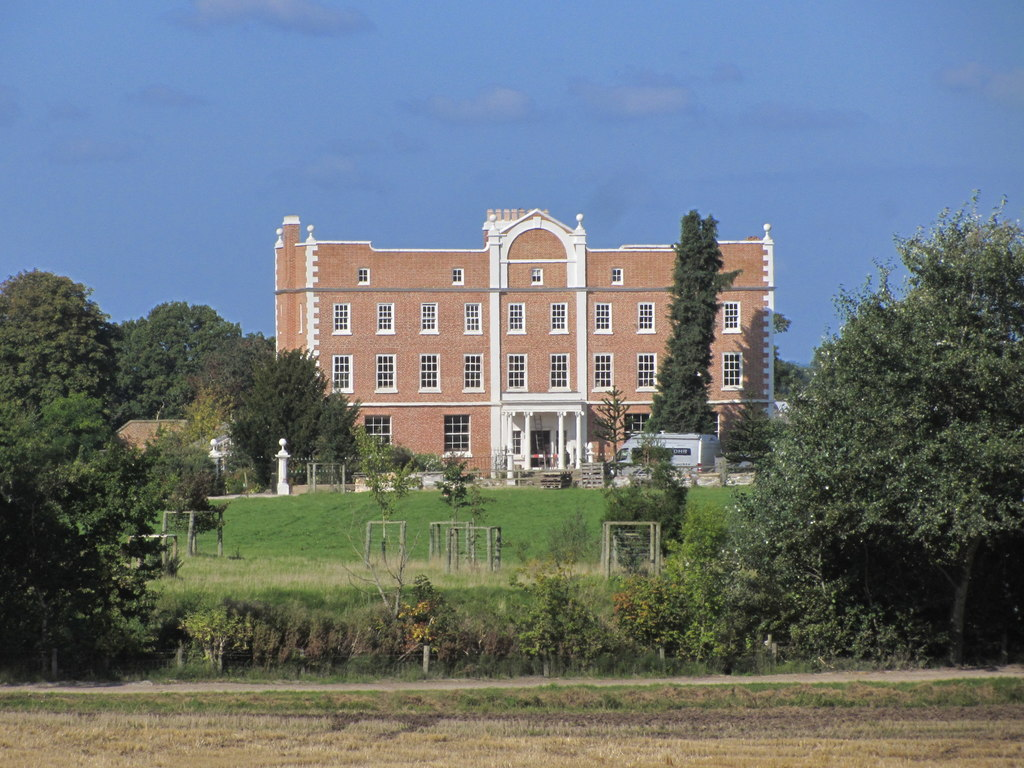
Hankelow Hall

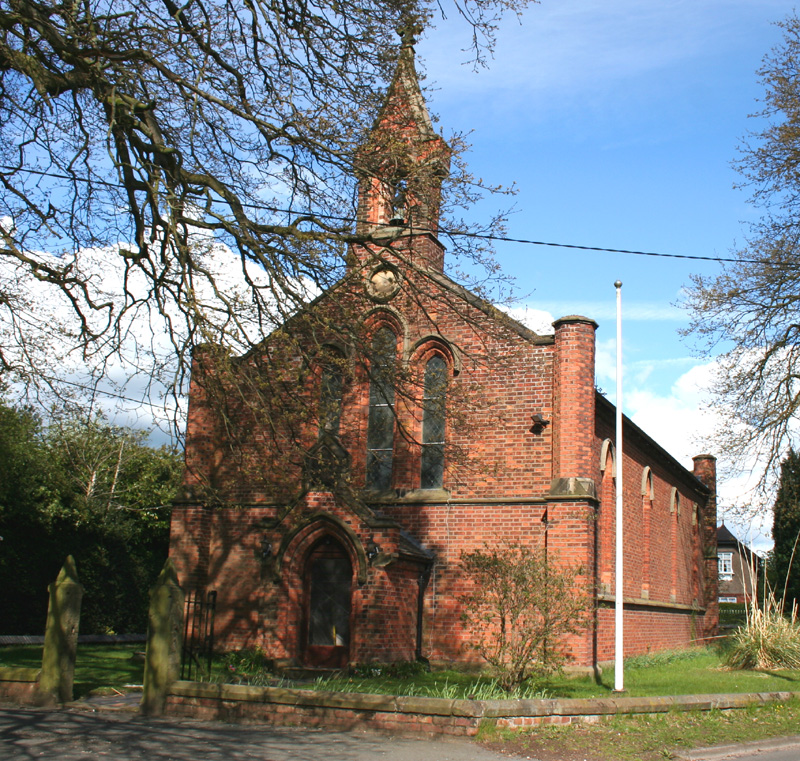
All Saints', Weston

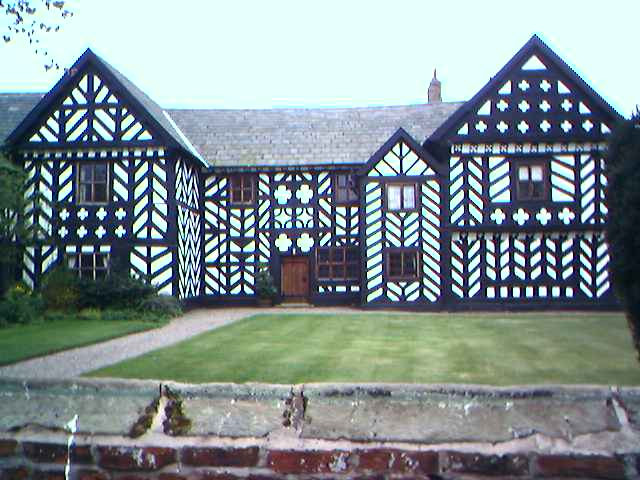
Haslington Hall

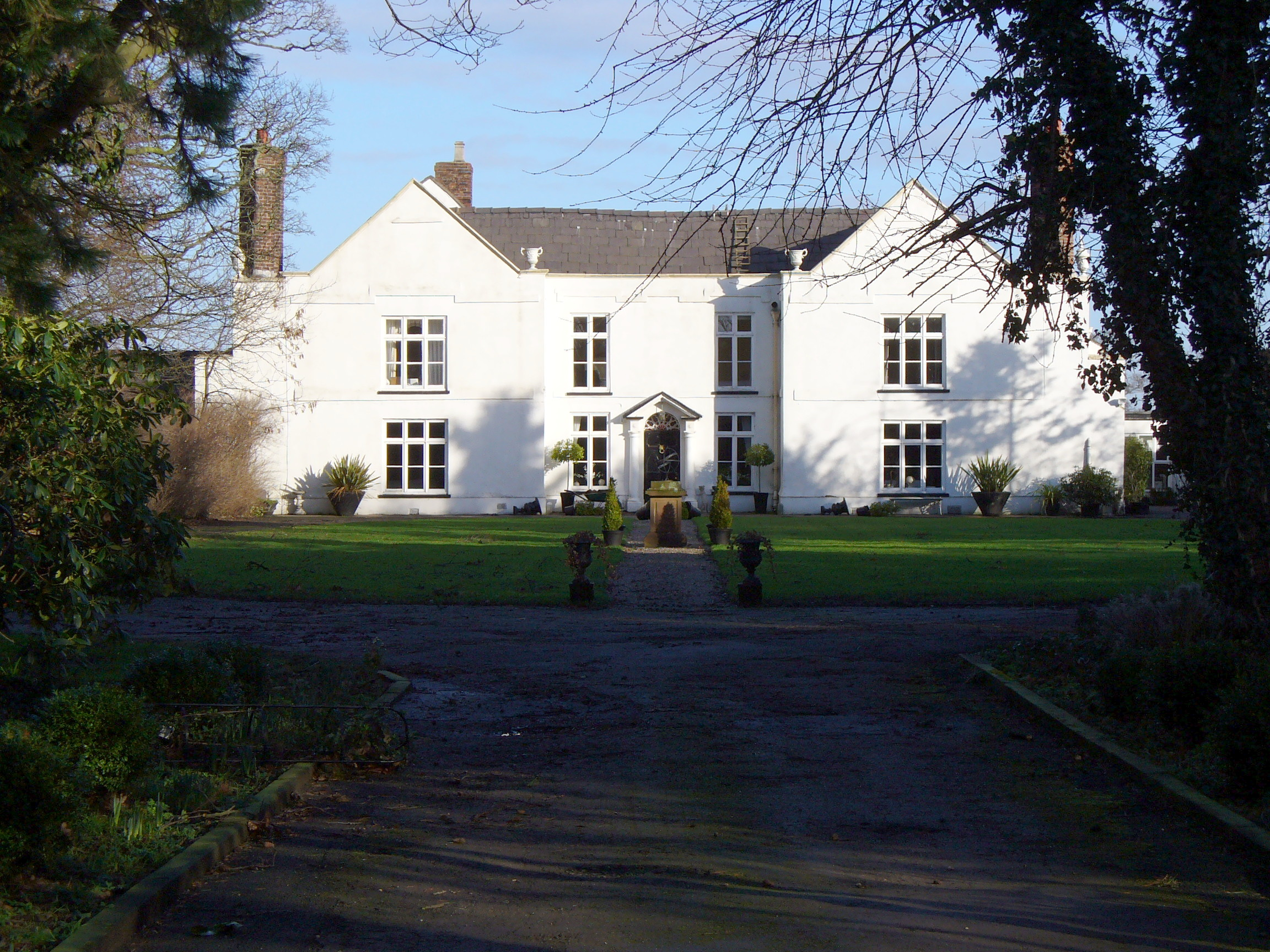
Hassall Hall

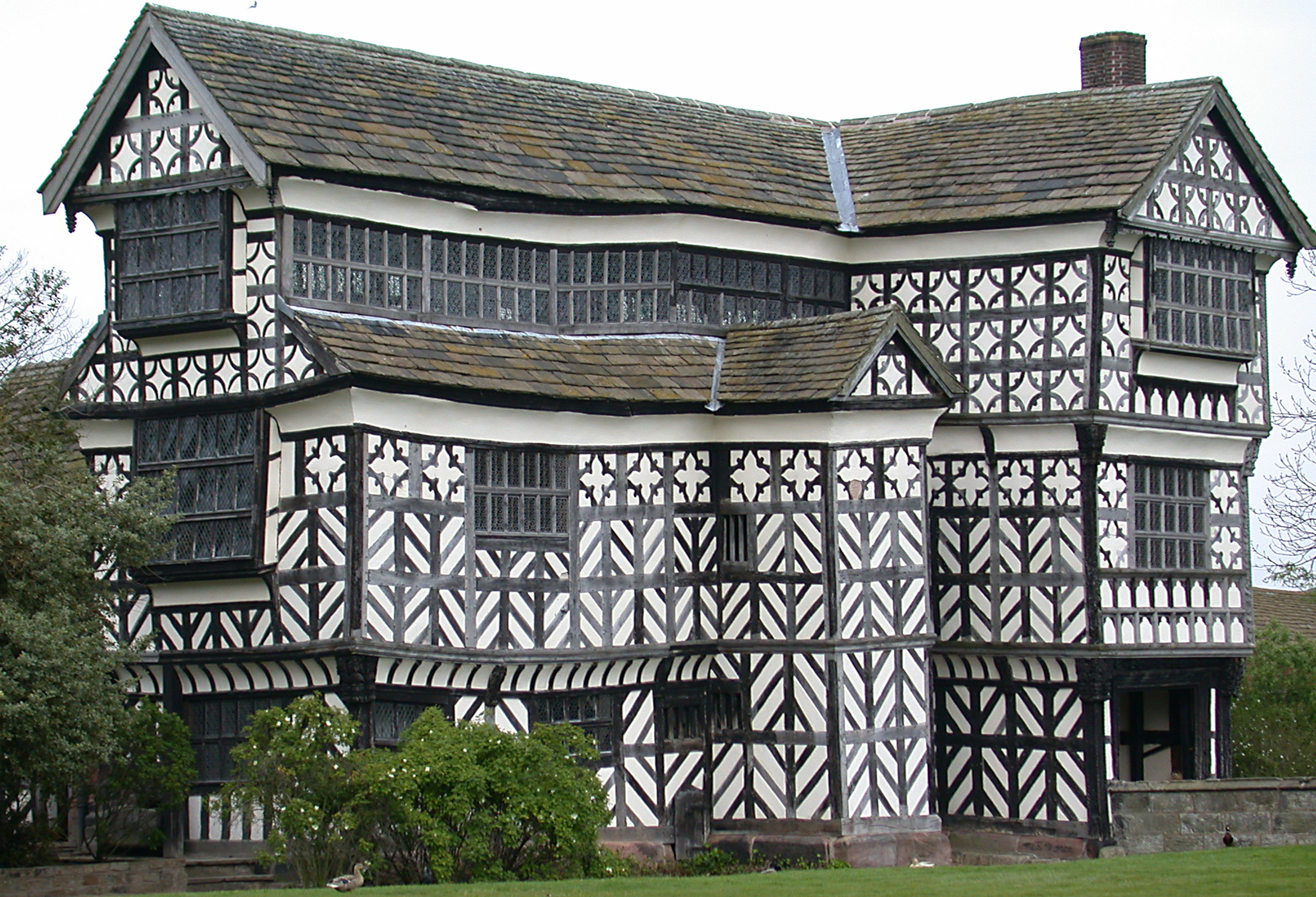
Little Moreton Hall

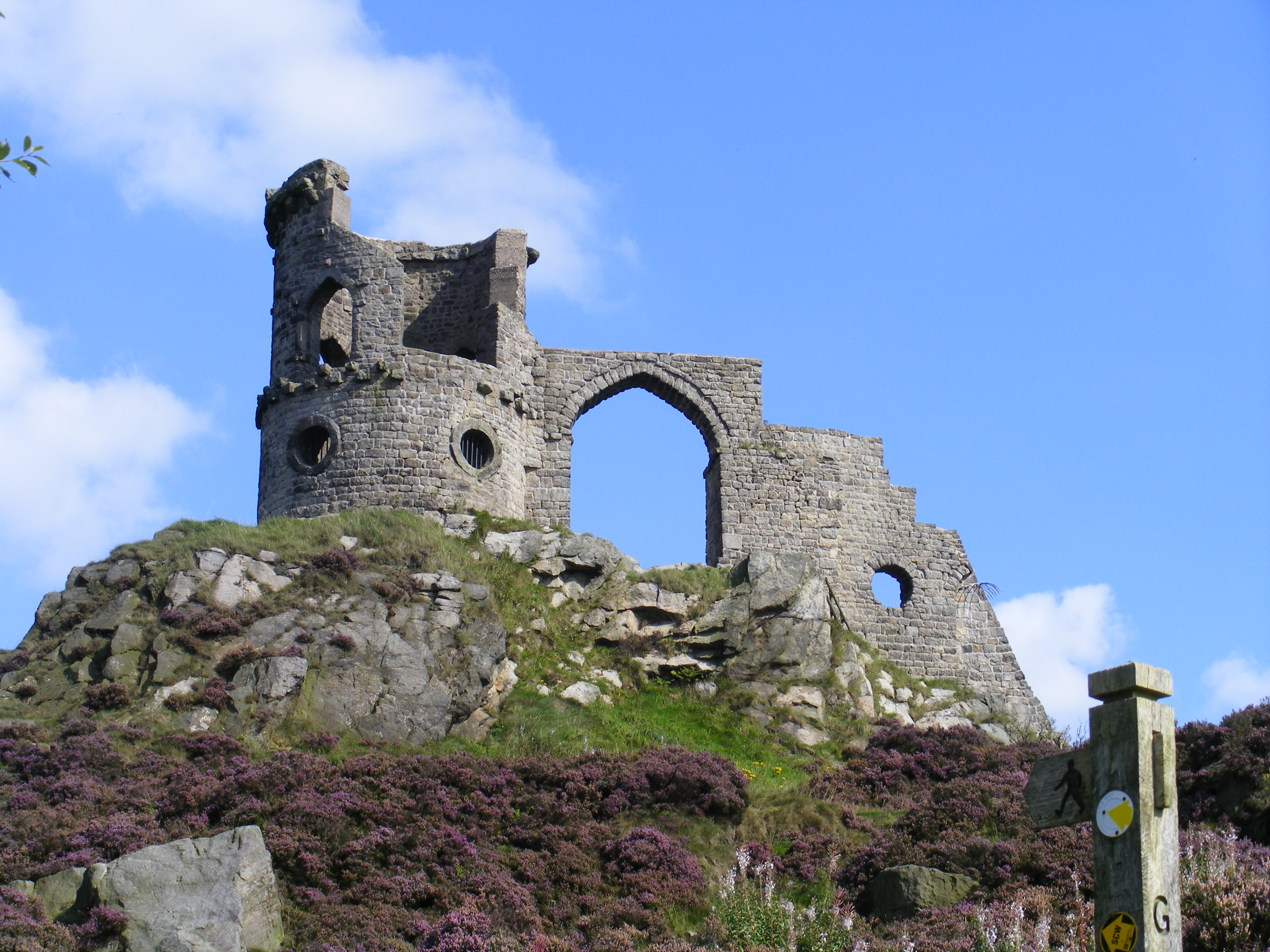
Mow Cop folly

== See also ==
- Recreational walks in Cheshire
