= Wybunbury =

Village in Cheshire, England

Coordinates: 53.045°N 2.450°W

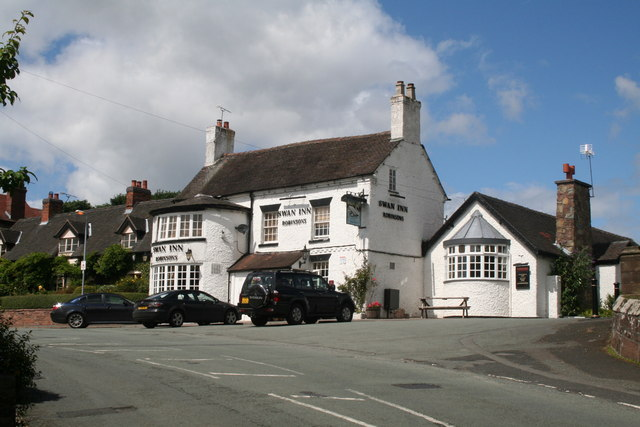
- The Swan Inn public house, Wybunbury

- Location within Cheshire
- Population: 1,459 (2011)
- OS grid reference: SJ697499
- Civil parish: Wybunbury
- Unitary authority: Cheshire East
- Ceremonial county: Cheshire
- Region: North West
- Country: England
- Sovereign state: United Kingdom
- Post town: NANTWICH
- Postcode district: CW5
- Dialling code: 01270
- Police: Cheshire
- Fire: Cheshire
- Ambulance: North West
- UK Parliament: Chester South and Eddisbury

Wybunbury/ˈwɪnb(ə)riː/ WIN-b(ə)ree or /ˈwɪmb(ə)riː/ WIM-b(ə)ree is a village (at SJ698499) and civil parish in the unitary authority of Cheshire East and the ceremonial county of Cheshire, England. The village lies 3¼ miles to the south east of Nantwich and 3¾ miles to the south of Crewe. The parish also includes the settlements of Clannor Heath, Daisy Hill, The Flag, Pinfold and parts of Blakelow, Haymoor Green and Howbeck Bank. Nearby villages include Hough, Shavington, Stapeley and Walgherton. The A51 runs east–west through the south-western corner of the parish.

According to the 2001 census, the parish had a population of 1,474, reducing to 1,459 at the 2011 Census.

Wybunbury was listed in the Domesday Book as Wimeberie.

== Governance ==
From 1974 the civil parish was served by Crewe and Nantwich Borough Council, which was succeeded on 1 April 2009 by the new unitary authority of Cheshire East. Wybunbury falls in the parliamentary constituency of Chester South and Eddisbury, which has been represented by Aphra Brandreth since 2024.

== Notable features ==
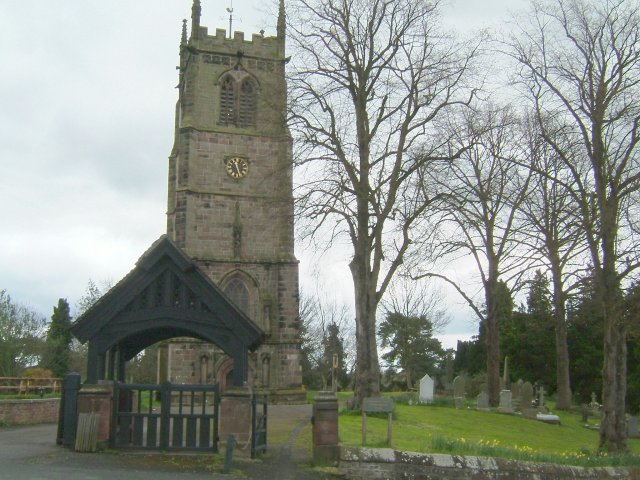
Leaning tower of St Chad's

The leaning tower of the former church of St Chad, also known as the 'Leaning Tower of South Cheshire' and the 'Hanging Steeple of Wimberie', is located in Wybunbury village. The 29.3-metre (96 ft) tower is all that remains of a late-15th-century church demolished in 1833. (Later churches, replacing the 15th-century one, were also demolished in 1892 and 1977.) The tower was stabilised using underexcavation by James Trubshaw in 1832; this is the earliest known application of the technique later used on the Leaning Tower of Pisa.

There are four Commonwealth service war graves of World War I in the original churchyard and, in the neighbouring churchyard extension, another three from the same war and four from World War II.

The parish also includes the lowland raised bog of Wybunbury Moss, a National Nature Reserve and Site of Special Scientific Interest.

== Geography and transport ==
Wybunbury Lane links the B5071 which runs through the Wybunbury parish to London Road (Stapeley). This lane provides a direct transport link between Wybunbury and the village of Stapeley.

== Education ==
Wybunbury Delves C of E Primary School is a Church of England primary school. Wybunbury Delves is a small school with around 250 pupils. The school is involved with sponsoring a school in Africa.

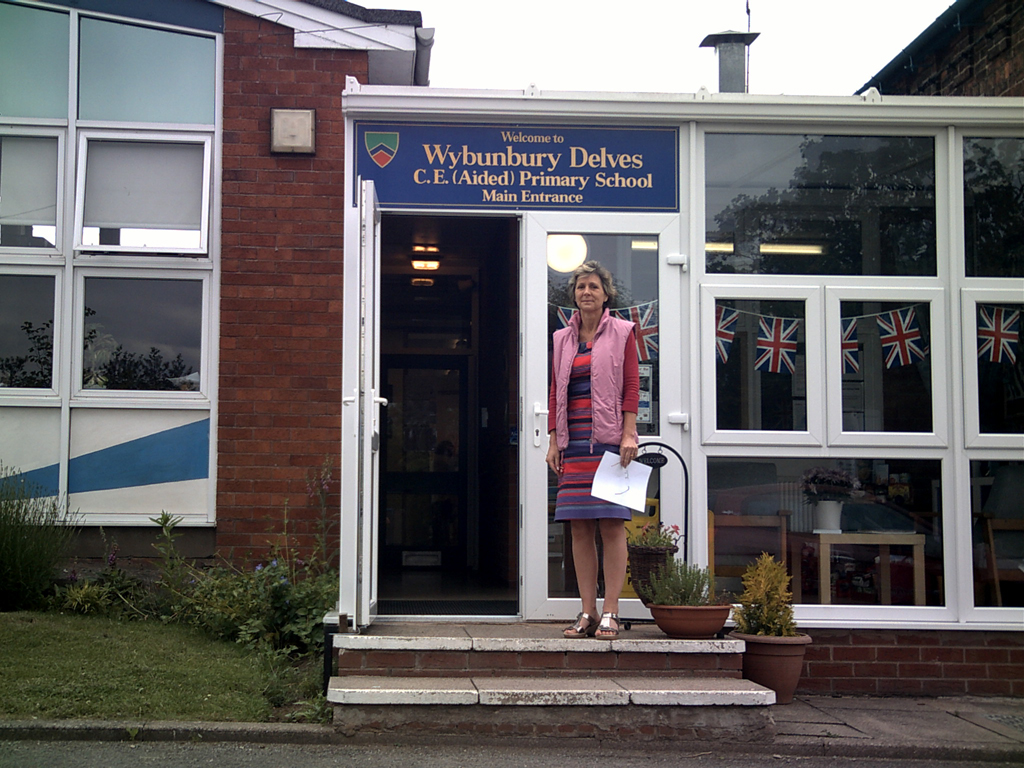
Wybunbury Delves School June 2012

== History ==
The village of Wybunbury is recorded as being one of the earliest settlements in Cheshire. It is said to take its name from 'Wigbeorn's manor' or stronghold. It is possible that he built a fortified residence of some sort on a site not far from a source of water. Old maps show the location of a moated site with a drawbridge, Hall Bank near Wybunbury Brook. The outline of the site is still visible today from the top of Wybunbury Tower.

Wybunbury was in Mercia, an Anglo-Saxon region in the North-west that was settled on loose tribal boundaries before the country was organised into shires. Wybunbury was already well established before the invasion of William the Conqueror in 1066 and is mentioned in the Domesday book of 1086.

== See also ==
- Listed buildings in Wybunbury
