= Shavington Academy =

Location
- Rope Lane; Shavington; Crewe, Cheshire, CW2 5DH; England; 53.0677°N 2.4573°W

Information
- Type: Academy
- Motto: "Together we enjoy, aspire, create & achieve"
- Local authority: Cheshire East Council
- Department for Education URN: 142237 Tables
- Ofsted: Reports
- Head Teacher: E.J. Casewell
- Gender: Coeducational
- Age: 11 to 16
- Capacity: ~1000
- Houses: 4
- Colours: Gold, Grey, Green & Purple
- School Website: http://www.shavington.academy/

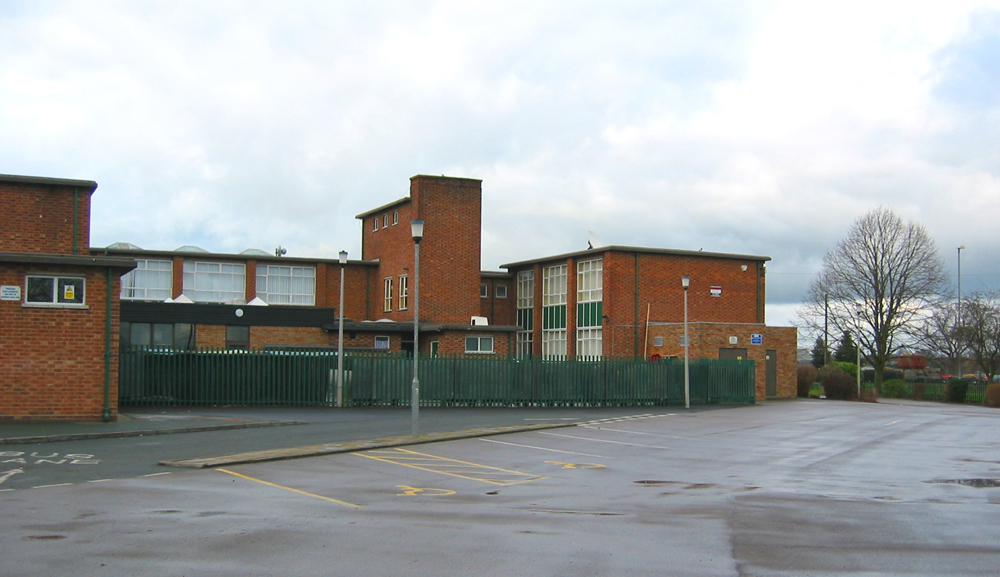
Shavington Academy, Rope, near Crewe, Cheshire

Shavington Academy (formerly Shavington High School) is a coeducational secondary school, located in Rope Lane, Shavington, Cheshire East, England. It is adjacent to the Shavington Leisure Centre.

Previously a foundation school administered by Cheshire East Council, Shavington High School converted to academy status in September 2015 and was renamed Shavington Academy. However the school continues to coordinate with Cheshire East Council for admissions.

== Notable former pupils ==
- Ashley Shaw (born 1991), cricketer
