= Madeley, Staffordshire =

Village in Staffordshire, England

Coordinates: 53.001°N 2.341°W

Madeley
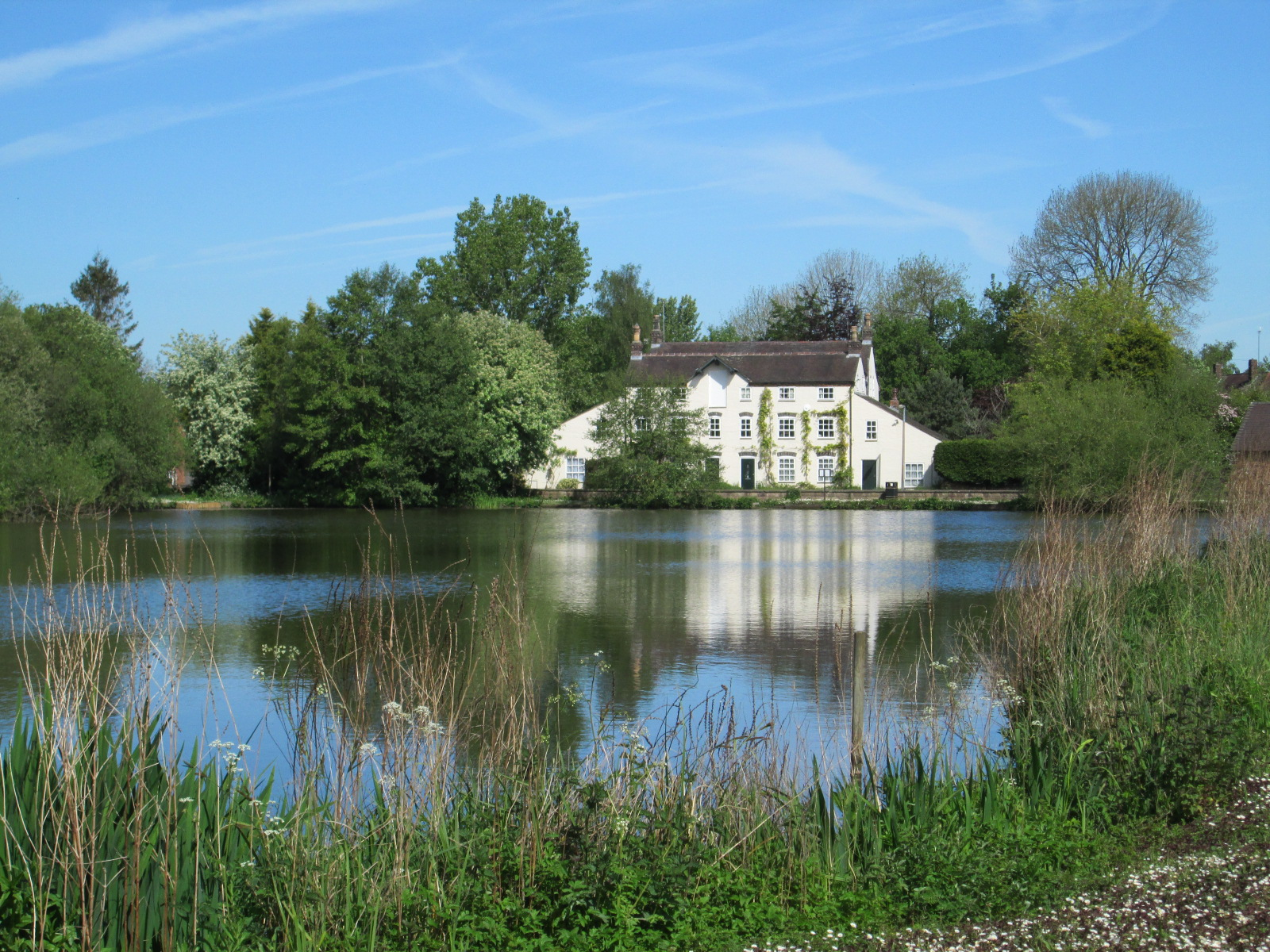
- Madeley Mill and Pool

- Location within Staffordshire
- Population: 4,222 (2011)
- OS grid reference: SJ773443
- District: Newcastle-under-Lyme
- Shire county: Staffordshire
- Region: West Midlands
- Country: England
- Sovereign state: United Kingdom
- Post town: CREWE
- Postcode district: CW3
- Dialling code: 01782
- Police: Staffordshire
- Fire: Staffordshire
- Ambulance: West Midlands
- UK Parliament: Newcastle-under-Lyme

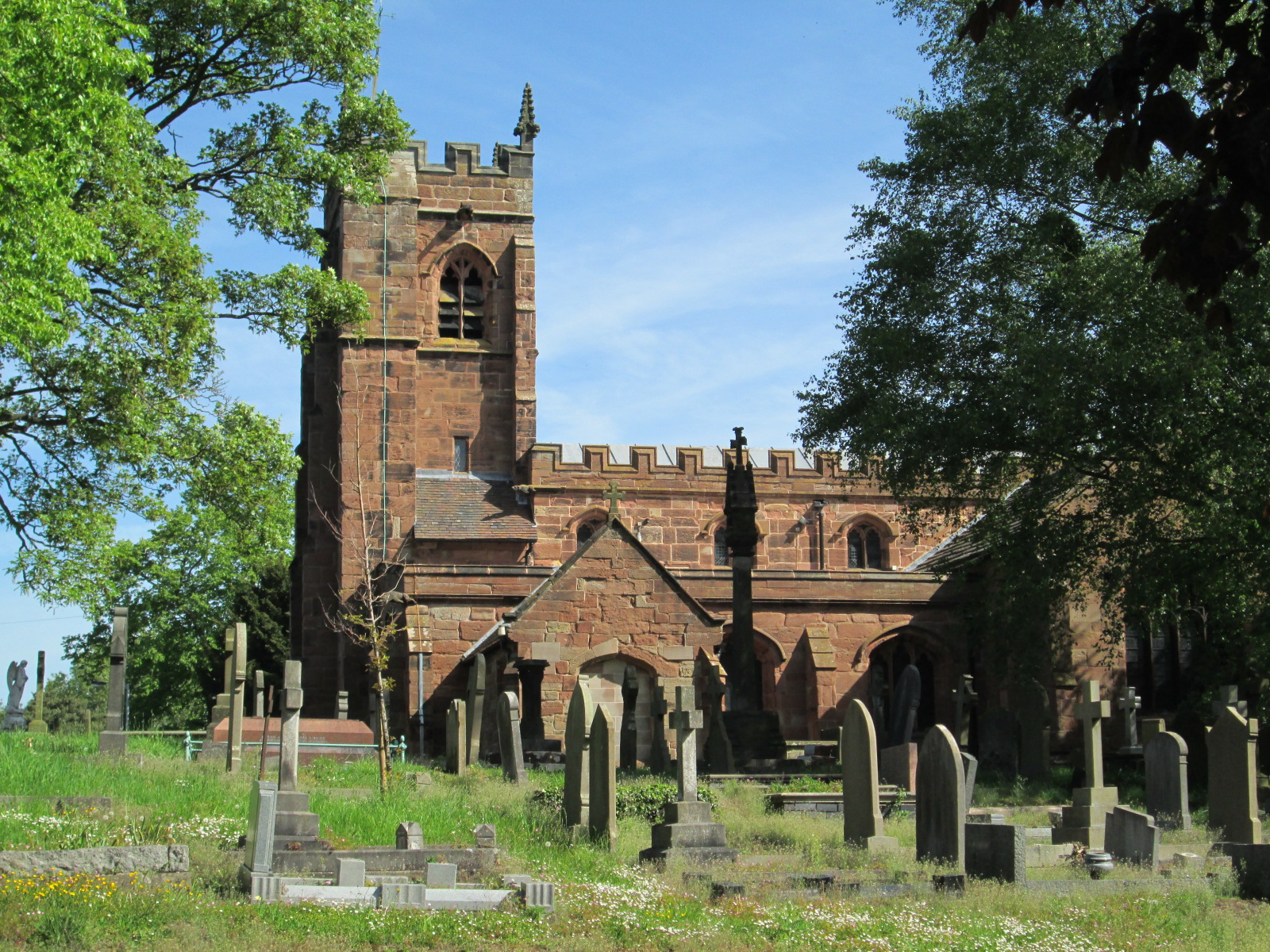
All Saints' Church, Madeley

Madeley is a village and ward in the Borough of Newcastle-under-Lyme, Staffordshire, England. It is split into three parts: Madeley, Middle Madeley and Little Madeley; Madeley Heath is also considered by many to be a constituent part. In the 2001 census, the population was recorded as 4,386; it decreased to 4,222 at the 2011 census.

== Geography ==
Madeley is located 5 miles (8 km) west of Newcastle-under-Lyme and is close to the Shropshire and Cheshire borders. To the north are the villages of Betley and Wrinehill; south is the hamlet of Baldwin's Gate; to the east is Keele, the home of Keele University as well as Silverdale; and Onneley and Woore lie to the west.

== History ==
Madeley is derived from the Saxon, Madanlieg, meaning 'a clearing in the woods belonging to Mada' (Mada is a female Saxon name).

Madeley is recorded in the Domesday Book of 1086 as being 2,160 acres (8.7 km^{2}) of wood, with four plough teams. The first Madeley Old Manor was built by Robert de Stafford, with the local church being founded in 1200. Heighley Castle was built in 1226 by Henry de Audley and was ordered to be demolished by a Parliamentary committee sitting at Stafford in 1644, to prevent its use by Royalists. Little remains today, but some of the ruins are still visible during winter through the vegetation surrounding the area.

Madeley Old Hall is a timber-framed Elizabethan house and now a country house hotel; it is a Grade II* listed building.

== Industry ==
A significant feature and well-known landmark of the village is Madeley Mill, which stands on the dam for the pool. During its history, the mill was used for grinding grain but, prior to its closure, production was turned over to cheese making. It fell into disrepair before being developed and converted into apartments in the early 1990s, saving it from proposed demolition by the local council.

There was a butcher's shop opposite the pool that was run by Arthur Bailey. He rented the shop initially from around 1957, moving to the village when he purchased the adjoining Pool House in 1962. He slaughtered his own animals in the now converted slaughterhouse. His wife, Marjorie (née Pearce), was one of the team who established the Christie Hospital in Manchester.

North Staffordshire was a centre for coal mining and the nearby mine at Leycett was known as Madeley under the National Coal Board. Sinking began in the 1880s and the colliery had five shafts with exotic names: Bang Up, Fair Lady, Clarkes, Harrisons and Woodburn. The pit closed on 21 September 1957. There is nothing left of the site nowadays, it being subject to open cast mining that removed the remaining coal and the slag heaps. It is used for agriculture.

Madeley has a shopping parade, built by the Wooliscroft family who lived down Furnace Lane. The telephone exchange was demolished in the early 1960s.

== Robert Dalton Carvings ==
In November 2024 a horse chestnut beside the pool, thought to be between 200 and 300 years old, fell during Storm Bert. The following April, chainsaw artist Rob Dalton carved its timber into a bench and a fish sculpture, and the bench was dedicated to former borough mayor Barry Panter. In summer 2026 the natural wood finish was covered in bright colours by two local councillors without prior public consultation. The work divided residents, and the artist objected that it could be mistaken for his own. At a parish council meeting attended by more than 50 residents, almost all voted in favour of restoring the pieces to their original condition. Whilst a public apology and financial contribution was sought by residents, the two councillors declined both the apology and the financial contribution to allow for restorative works.

== Education ==
Meadows Primary School, Sir John Offley Primary School and Madeley High School all serve the surrounding area.

As part of the expansion in higher and further education, Madeley College opened in 1962 and specialised in men's physical education and home economics. It closed in the mid-1980s after becoming part of the North Staffordshire Polytechnic.

== Transport ==
=== Roads ===
The majority of the settlement lies between the M6 motorway and the West Coast Main Line, but there is no nearby access to the motorway. The A525 road passes through Madeley as a primary route. It connects with the A531 which further connects with the A500 to the north.

Buses are run by D&G Bus.

=== Railways ===
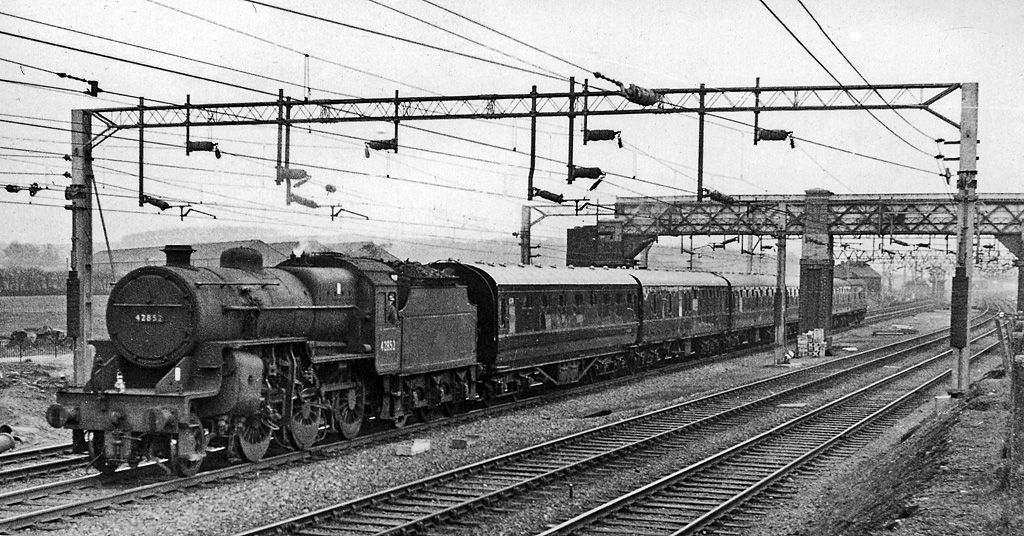
Train of new carriages at the site of Madeley LNWR station in 1962

Madeley was served by two railway stations:

- Madeley was a stop on the West Coast Main Line, which closed in 1954. It was previously a stabling point for the Royal Train.
- Madeley Road served the North Staffordshire Railway's branch line to Market Drayton, which was opened on 1 February 1870 and closed in 1931. However, during the 1960s, it was reopened and used as a messroom by British Rail train crew and shunters for running around coal trains destined for Silverdale and Holditch collieries. These trains came off the main line and onto the former branch via Madeley Chord. This arrangement continued until Silverdale Colliery closed in 1998.

The nearest National Rail stations are at Longport, on the Crewe to Derby line, and Stoke-on-Trent for principal services to Manchester Piccadilly and London Euston on the West Coast Main Line.

== Notable people ==
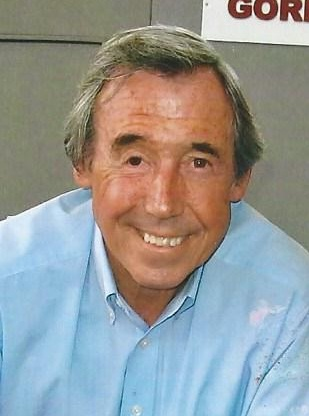
Gordon Banks in 2007

- James Tuchet, 5th Baron Audley (c. 1398–1459), born in Heleigh Castle near Madeley, an English peer.
- Joseph Elkington (1740–1806) English agriculturalist, reformed to land drainage. Elkington moved to Hey House in Staffordshire in 1797 and farmed land at Madeley which became known as Bog Farm.
- William Bridges Adams (1797–1872) author, inventor and locomotive engineer, was educated at Madeley School. He is best known for his patented Adams axle.
- Ian Fraser Kilmister (1945–2015), known as "Lemmy", grew up locally, singer/songwriter from Motörhead

=== Sport ===
- Gordon Banks (1937–2019), 1966 World Cup England national team goalkeeper, lived in the village.
- Paul Goodwin (born 1978) English minor counties cricketer, right-handed batsman and wicket-keeper, was born in Madeley Heath.
- Nathan Smith (born 1996) English professional footballer, played 360 games for Port Vale F.C.

== See also ==
- Listed buildings in Madeley, Staffordshire
