= Listed buildings in Madeley, Staffordshire =

Madeley is a civil parish in the district of Newcastle-under-Lyme, Staffordshire, England. It contains 38 listed buildings that are recorded in the National Heritage List for England. Of these, one is listed at Grade I, the highest of the three grades, one is at Grade II*, the middle grade, and the others are at Grade II, the lowest grade. The parish contains the villages of Madeley and Onneley and the surrounding countryside. Most of the listed buildings are houses and associated structures, cottages, farmhouses and farm buildings. The other listed buildings include a church, monuments in the churchyard, the remains of a castle and a manor house, almshouses, a drinking fountain, mileposts, a school, a war memorial, and a telephone kiosk.

== Key ==
Grade	Criteria
I	Buildings of exceptional interest, sometimes considered to be internationally important
II*	Particularly important buildings of more than special interest
II	Buildings of national importance and special interest

== Buildings ==
Name and location	Photograph	Date	Notes	Grade
All Saints Church; 52.99627°N 2.33977°W		12th century	The church was extensively remodelled in the 14th and 15th centuries, and in 1872 it was restored and the chancel rebuilt by Charles Lynam. The church is built in pink sandstone, and has roofs of stone-slate, tile and lead. It consists of a nave with a clerestory, north and south aisles, a south porch, north and south transepts, a chancel, a north chancel chapel, a north organ chamber, and a west tower embraced by the aisles. The tower has stepped buttresses, a southwest rectangular stair turret, a west door with a Tudor arch, a west window, gargoyles, and an embattled parapet with crocketed pinnacles. The nave also has an embattled parapet, and inside the church is a Norman arcade.	I
Heighley Castle; 53.01715°N 2.34058°W		Early 13th century (probable)	Only fragments of the walls remain, and they are in sandstone. There are traces of the curtain wall around the site, and impressive earthworks. The castle is also a scheduled monument.	II
Remains of Old Madeley Manor; 52.97755°N 2.33969°W		15th or early 16th century	A former manor house, the remains are in red sandstone, and consist of a fragment of a wall with a maximum height of just over 3 metres (9.8 ft). The wall contains part of a round-headed doorway with a portcullis groove. The remains are also a scheduled monument.	II
Farm buildings north of Lower Stoney Low House; 52.99208°N 2.31464°W	—	15th or 16th century	A barn and stable block with a timber framed core and cruck construction, refaced in purplish-brown brick in the 19th century, and with tile roofs. They form an angled L-shaped plan, and have two storeys, and a dentilled eaves cornice. The buildings contain pitching holes, external steps leading to a loft door, stable doors, vents, and various blocked openings. Inside the barn are three true cruck trusses.	II
Ye Olde House and Bridge Cottage (part); 52.99515°N 2.34135°W	—	16th century	A house that was remodelled in about 1700, later altered and extended, and divided into two dwellings. It has a timber framed core, with refacing and extensions in plum brick, with floor bands and a tile roof. There are two storeys and an attic, and an L-shaped plan, consisting of a front range of two bays, and a rendered two-storey rear wing. The windows are casements with cambered heads.	II
Town House; 52.99372°N 2.34031°W	—	Late 16th century	A farmhouse, later a private house, it was remodelled in the 18th century, and altered and extended later. The house has a timber framed core, with refacing and extensions in brick, stuccoed at the front, and roughcast at the rear, and the roofs are tiled with cresting. There are two storeys and an attic, originally an H-shaped plan, with a hall range and gabled cross-wings, and later extensions to the right and at the rear. Between the cross-wings at the front is a later single-storey lean-to with a moulded parapet, and there is a timber porch between the right cross-wing and a later extension. The windows are sashes, and the gables have fretted bargeboards and finials. At the rear of the left cross-wing is a stable wing with a hayloft. Inside, there is exposed timber framing.	II
Lower Stoney Low House; 52.99172°N 2.31442°W	—	16th or 17th century	The farmhouse was remodelled in the 19th century. It is in red and purplish-brown brick, plastered at the rear, with a dentilled eaves cornice, and a tile roof. There are two storeys, and the plan consists of a two-bay hall range with two storeys, flanked by projecting gabled cross-wings with two storeys and attics. In the centre is a gabled porch, and the windows are casements with massive lintels. Inside, there is an inglenook fireplace.	II
Offley Almshouses and wall 52.99456°N 2.34060°W	—	1645	A row of almshouses that were remodelled and extended in 1889, and restored in 1986. They are in purplish-brown brick, with a dentilled eaves cornice and a tile roof. There are two storeys and ten bays. On the front are porches with hipped roofs, and the windows are casements, those in the ground floor with segmental heads. Along the front of the almshouses is a brick wall with stone capping.	II
The Old Hall; 52.99854°N 2.33914°W		1647	The house was extended in the 19th and 20th centuries. The original part is timber framed with plastered and brick infill on a sandstone plinth, with tile roofs. There are two storeys and an attic, and a cruciform plan, with a main range and projecting two-bay gabled wings. Both storeys of the gables, and the upper storey at the front of the house, are jettied and have bulbous corbel brackets, with an inscribed bressumer on the front. To the rear of the right wing is a 19th-century brick wing and a conservatory, and a 20th-century two-storey brick extension and a lean-to, and on the front in the angle is a 20th-century lean-to porch.	II*
Birches Farmhouse; 52.99599°N 2.33636°W	—	17th century	The farmhouse was considerably altered and extended in the 19th century. It has a timber framed core, refaced and extended in purplish-brown brick, and has a tile roof. There are two storeys, and it consists of a rectangular block, with a rear wing and later extensions. The west front has four bays, the right bay projecting and pedimented. There is one sash window, and the other windows are casements. Inside, there is some exposed timber framing.	II
Higher Thornhill Farmhouse; 53.00889°N 2.35142°W	—	17th century (probable)	The farmhouse was remodelled in the 18th century, and extended and altered in the 19th century. It has a timber framed core, the alterations and extensions are in red and purple brick, and the roof is tiled. The farmhouse has two storeys, and consists of a hall range of two bays and two storeys, and a gabled cross-wing with two storeys and an attic and floor bands. On the front is a gabled porch, and the windows are casements, some with cambered heads.	II
The Cottage; 53.01580°N 2.34777°W	—	17th century	The cottage was extended in the 20th century. The original part is timber framed with painted brick infill, the cladding and extension are in painted brick, and it has a pantiled roof. There is one storey and an attic, the windows are 20th-century casements, the gabled porch is in the west gable end, and there are gabled dormers.	II
Yew Tree Cottage, Onneley; 52.98596°N 2.36953°W	—	17th century	A timber framed cottage with painted brick infill, it has a tile roof. There is one storey and an attic, and two bays. In the centre is a gabled porch, the windows are casements, and there are two gabled dormers.	II
Wisteria Cottage; 52.99880°N 2.33959°W	—	c. 1700 (probable)	The house, which was extended and altered in the 19th century, is in painted brick with a moulded eaves cornice, and a tile roof. There are two storeys, and an L-shaped plan, consisting of a three-bay main range, a three-bay rear wing on the right with a dentilled eaves cornice, and a short parallel rear range. In the ground floor are canted bay windows and a doorway with a pediment. The other windows are casements with cambered heads and raised keystones.	II
Hey House; 52.98639°N 2.33561°W	—	Early 18th century	The house, which was extended in the 19th century, is in painted brick, and has a tile roof, with coped verges on kneelers to the earlier part. There are two storeys, and two five-bay ranges, the earlier to the left, and the later recessed on the right. The windows are sashes, and in the earlier part are French windows and a verandah on cast iron columns. There is a more elaborate verandah on the left gable end, and a rear wing.	II
Broade and Halmarach memorial 52.99640°N 2.33959°W	—	c. 1769	The memorial is in the churchyard of All Saints Church, and is to the memory of members of the Broade, Halmarach and Rowley families. It is a chest tomb in sandstone, and has a rectangular plan. The tomb has moulded capping, reeded corner pilasters, and inscription panels that are largely indecipherable.	II
Manor Farmhouse; 52.98177°N 2.34141°W	—	1770	The farmhouse, which was extended in the 19th century, is in red brick with a corbelled eaves cornice and a tile roof. There are three storeys, originally with an L-shaped plan and a front of three bays, there is a later range in purple brick recessed on the right. The doorway has a rectangular fanlight and a gabled hood, and the windows are casements, those in the lower two floors with cambered heads.	II
Cope memorial 52.99618°N 2.33995°W	—	Late 18th century	The memorial is in the churchyard of All Saints Church, and is to the memory of members of the Cope family. It is a chest tomb in sandstone, and has a rectangular plan. The tomb has a moulded plinth and capping, square corner balusters, and an inscription panel on the south side.	II
Rowley memorial (south of porch); 52.99610°N 2.33986°W	—	Late 18th century	The memorial is in the churchyard of All Saints Church, and is to the memory of members of the Rowley family. It is a chest tomb in sandstone, and has a rectangular plan. The tomb has square corner balusters and an inscribed projecting top slab. On the top is a carving depicting the head of a winged angel, and at the foot there is a skull and cross-bones and a heart.	II
Unidentified chest tomb 52.99618°N 2.33996°W	—	Late 18th century (probable)	The tomb is in the churchyard of All Saints Church, and is a chest tomb in sandstone, with a rectangular plan. The tomb has a moulded plinth and capping, square corner balusters with rosette and urn emblems, and a moulded inscription panel with fluted fans on the corners. The inscription is illegible.	II
Brice Storr memorial 52.99622°N 2.33937°W	—	c. 1803	The memorial is in the churchyard of All Saints Church, and is to the memory of Revd. Brice Storr and members of his family. It is a chest tomb in sandstone, and has a rectangular plan. The tomb has a moulded plinth and capping, square corner balusters, and moulded inscription panels with floral decoration on the corners.	II
Timmis memorial (west of tower); 52.99623°N 2.34007°W	—	c. 1805	The memorial is in the churchyard of All Saints Church, and is to the memory of members of the Timmis family. It is a chest tomb in sandstone, and has a rectangular plan. The tomb has a moulded plinth and capping, square corner balusters, and a moulded rectangular and round-edged inscription panel on the north side.	II
Timmis memorial (south of chancel); 52.99621°N 2.33955°W	—	c. 1817	The memorial is in the churchyard of All Saints Church, and is to the memory of members of the Timmis family. It is a chest tomb in sandstone, and has a rectangular plan. The tomb has a moulded plinth and capping, reeded corner balusters, and a moulded inscription panel on the south side.	II
Madeley Manor and conservatory 53.01011°N 2.33581°W	—	c. 1820–30	A country house, later divided into flats and offices. It is stuccoed on a plastered sandstone plinth, and has a moulded string course, and a hipped slate roof. There are two storeys and an irregular plan, with a main block, and service blocks, outbuildings, and a conservatory. At the entrance is a Doric portico, and the windows are sashes. Features include recessed plaques containing scenes from the Parthenon Frieze in relief, a full-height bow window with a conical roof, and in the service block is a water tower.	II
Netherset Hey Farmhouse; 52.98756°N 2.32135°W	—	Early 19th century	A red brick farmhouse with a tile roof. There are three storeys, and an L-shaped plan, consisting of a three-bay main range and a rear range. The central doorway has a verandah on four cast iron columns, and the windows are casements, those on the ground floor with cambered heads.	II
Rowley memorial (southeast of south transept); 52.99608°N 2.33928°W	—	Early 19th century	The memorial is in the churchyard of All Saints Church, and is to the memory of members of the Rowley family. It is a chest tomb in sandstone, and has a rectangular plan. The tomb has a moulded plinth and capping, reeded square corner balusters, a frieze with reeded decoration, rosette and urn motifs, and scrolled leaf decoration and urns on the ends.	II
Timmis memorial (north of north transept); 52.99642°N 2.33973°W	—	c. 1827	The memorial is in the churchyard of All Saints Church, and is to the memory of members of the Timmis family. It is a chest tomb in sandstone, and has a rectangular plan. The tomb has a moulded plinth and capping with fluted corners, and a moulded rectangular inscription panel on south with floral decoration in the corners.	II
Wilkinson memorial 52.99642°N 2.33961°W	—	c. 1830	The memorial is in the churchyard of All Saints Church, and is to the memory of members of the Wilkinson family. It is a chest tomb in sandstone, and has a rectangular plan. The tomb has a moulded plinth and capping, square corner balusters, and inscription panels on the north and south sides.	II
Buckley memorial 52.99612°N 2.33963°W	—	c. 1846	The memorial is in the churchyard of All Saints Church, and is to the memory of Thomas Buckley. It is a chest tomb in sandstone, and has a rectangular plan. The tomb has a moulded plinth and capping, with fluted corners, and a moulded inscription panel on the north side.	II
Offley Well Head; 52.99229°N 2.34152°W	—	1850	The drinking fountain is in grey and yellow limestone, and is in Jacobean style. It has an octagonal plan, on a plinth, with lead spouts, shell-like basins, and a door on the west. On the sides are panels, and above is a moulded cornice, a decorative parapet, and a head with broken pediments and a sundial. The basin has brick walls, and the fountain stands on a platform with an open strapwork balustrade, and a higher quadrant sandstone wall at the rear. Steps lead up to the platform, at the base of which are wrought iron gates.	II
Milepost at NGR; SJ 7636 4649; 53.01514°N 2.35415°W		Mid to late 19th century (probable)	The milepost is on the south side of the A531 road. It is in cast iron and has a triangular plan with a chamfered top. On the top is "MADELEY", and on the sides are the distances to Betley, Basford, Nantwich, Keele, and Newcastle-under-Lyme.	II
Milepost at NGR; SJ 7687 4413; 52.99391°N 2.34641°W		Mid to late 19th century (probable)	The milepost is on the south side of the A525 road. It is in cast iron and has a triangular plan with a chamfered top. On the top is "MADELEY", and on the sides are the distances to Madeley, Onneley, Woore, Keele, and Newcastle-under-Lyme.	II
Milepost at NGR; SJ 7764 4523; 53.00397°N 2.33472°W		Mid to late 19th century (probable)	The milepost is on the south side of the A525 road. It is in cast iron and has a triangular plan with a chamfered top. On the top is "MADELEY", and on the sides are the distances to Madeley, Onneley, Woore, Keele, and Newcastle-under-Lyme.	II
Sir John Offley Primary School; 52.99628°N 2.34049°W		1875	The school, which was enlarged in 1887, is in sandstone on a high chamfered plinth, with quoins and a tile roof with ornamental cresting. There is a single storey, and on the front is a gable to the left, two gabled half-dormers, two lower hip roofed porches, and two prominent tapering chimney stacks with round shafts and moulded capping.. The windows are mullioned and transomed.	II
School House; 52.99607°N 2.34052°W	—	1876	A schoolmaster's house, later a private house, it is in sandstone, with quoins, and a tile roof with ornamental cresting. There are two storeys, and a T-shaped plan, with a front range of three bays, the middle bay gabled. On the front is a porch with a hipped roof, and the windows are mullioned.	II
Boat house, Madeley Manor; 53.01033°N 2.33249°W	—	c. 1890	The boathouse is in red brick on a plinth of sandstone and brick, with applied timbers on the sides, and a tile roof. There is one storey over the boat access, on the front are round-headed entrances, on each side are six blind round-headed arches, and casement windows.	II
War memorial 53.00712°N 2.32331°W		1921	The war memorial stands in an enclosure at a road junction. It is in sandstone, and consists of a life-size statue of a soldier in the uniform of the First World War standing and holding a rifle. The statue is on a tall, tapered pedestal, on a square plinth with a single-stepped base. On the pedestal is a frieze and an inscription panel on each face, which include the names of those lost in both World Wars.	II
Telephone Kiosk; 52.99639°N 2.34019°W	—	1935	The telephone kiosk stands outside the school. It is of the K6 type designed by Giles Gilbert Scott. The kiosk is constructed in cast iron with a square plan and a dome, and has three unperforated crowns in the top panels.	II
