= Paul Goodwin =

Paul Goodwin may refer to:

- Paul Goodwin (conductor)
- Paul Goodwin (cricketer)
- Paul Goodwin (curator)

== See also ==
- Paul Godwin, violinist
