= Madeley Old Hall =

Elizabethan house which is now a small hotel in Madeley, Staffordshire, England

Coordinates: 52.9985°N 2.3390°W

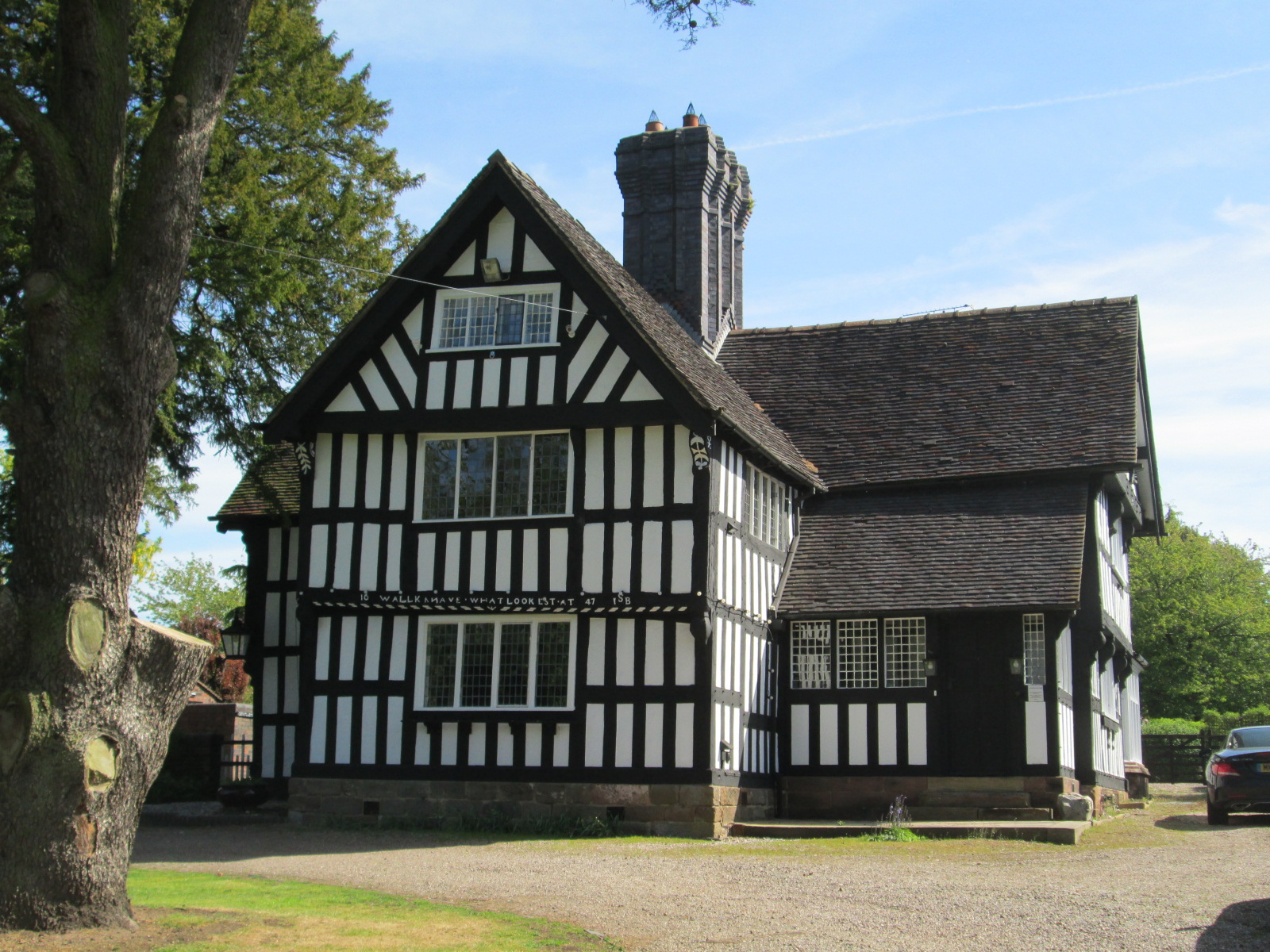
Madeley Old Hall

Madeley Old Hall is a black and white Elizabethan house, now a small hotel, in the village of Madeley in Staffordshire, England. It stands in 2 acres of landscaped gardens and is a Grade II* listed building.

Built in the late 1500s, it is a timber-framed building with plaster infill standing on a sandstone plinth, originally with a cruciform floor-plan. Across the front gable of the house is carved the warning "WALLK KNAVE. WHAT LOOKEST AT".

The property was acquired in 2007 by Gary and Simon White and run as a country house hotel. It is also licensed for weddings.

== See also ==
- Grade II* listed buildings in Newcastle-under-Lyme (borough)
- Listed buildings in Madeley, Staffordshire
- Madeley Old Manor (Staffordshire)
- Madeley Court (Shropshire)
