= Joseph Elkington =

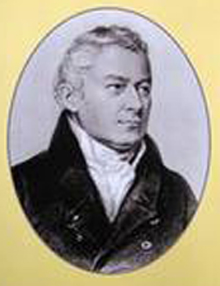
- Born: Baptised 1 January 1740; Warwickshire, England
- Died: October 1806
- Resting place: Graveyard of All Saints' Church, Madeley, Staffordshire, England
- Monuments: In All Saints' churchyard, Stretton-on-Dunsmore, Warwickshire
- Occupations: Farmer; Drainage engineer
- Known for: Improvements to land drainage
- Relatives: George Elkington (grandson)
- Awards: £1,000 and gold ring

Joseph Elkington (baptised 1 January 1740 at Stretton-on-Dunsmore in Warwickshire, died October 1806) was an English agriculturalist, lauded by parliament for his reforms to land drainage.

== Career ==
While farming at Princethorpe, Warwickshire he devised a way of using boreholes to drain boggy land. For this innovation, and concerned that his frail health would result in the loss of his knowledge before it was shared, parliament awarded him, in 1795, £1,000 and a gold ring. Edinburgh land surveyor John Johnstone (d. 1838) was employed by the Board of Agriculture to study Elkington's methods.

Elkington subsequently worked in partnership with Lancelot "Capability" Brown to develop drainage plans for the latter's landscaping schemes, starting with one at Fisherwick Park near Lichfield.

Elkington moved to Hey House in Staffordshire in 1797 to farm 500 acres (200 ha) of land at Madeley, which became known as Bog Farm.

== Personal life ==
Elkington was the eldest son of Joseph Elkington (1697–1758), a yeoman farmer, and Mary, née Gallimore (died 1750). He had epilepsy. He married Sarah Webb (baptised 1738, died 1821), daughter of Richard and Mary, on 26 December 1760. Nine of their children survived Elkington. His grandson was the industrialist George Elkington. He died at Hay House on 17 October 1806 and was buried in the churchyard at All Saints' Church, Madeley on 20 October. A monument to him in All Saints' churchyard, Stretton-on-Dunsmore, calls him a "pioneer of land drainage".
