= Listed buildings in Betley =

Betley is a civil parish in the district of Newcastle-under-Lyme, Staffordshire, England. It contains 40 listed buildings that are recorded in the National Heritage List for England. Of these, one is listed at Grade I, the highest of the three grades, four are at Grade II*, the middle grade, and the others are at Grade II, the lowest grade. The parish contains the villages of Betley, Ravenshall, and Wrinehill, and the surrounding countryside. The listed buildings are adjacent to, or near, the A531 road, and most are houses and associated structures, cottages, farmhouses and farm buildings, the earliest of which are timber framed or have timber-framed cores. The other listed buildings are bridges, a public house, mileposts, and a telephone kiosk.

== Key ==
Grade	Criteria
I	Buildings of exceptional interest, sometimes considered to be internationally important
II*	Particularly important buildings of more than special interest
II	Buildings of national importance and special interest

== Buildings ==
Name and location	Photograph	Date	Notes	Grade
Betley Old Hall; 53.03829°N 2.37131°W	—	15th century (probable)	The house was remodelled and extended in the 16th–17th century, and extended again in the 19th century. It is timber framed with plastered infill and a tile roof. There are two storeys, a four-bay range, a two-bay single storey hall, a further block, and a gabled cross-wing, resulting in a T-shaped plan, and a later extension. Most of the windows are casements, there is a blocked mullioned window, and the cross-wing has a crow-stepped parapet.	II*
Ravenshall Farmhouse; 53.02467°N 2.36866°W	—	15th century (probable)	Originally a timber framed house with cruck construction, it was largely rebuilt in the 18th and 19th centuries, the outer walls were rebuilt in red brick, and the roof is tiled. There are two storeys, and a T-shaped plan, consisting of a three-bay hall range, a gabled cross-wing to the right, and an extension to the left. In the angle is a gabled porch, and the windows are casements, most with segmental heads. Inside there are two cruck trusses.	II
St Margaret's Church; 53.03287°N 2.36588°W		c. 1500	The church has a timber framed core, the church was later altered and expanded, the chancel was rebuilt in 1610, and the church was restored in 1842 by Scott and Moffatt. It is built in sandstone with a tile roof, and consists of a nave with a clerestory, north and south aisles, north and south porches, a chancel, and a west tower. The tower has four stages, diagonal buttresses, a moulded cornice and a coped parapet with corner pilaster strips.	I
Laburnum Cottage, Betley; 53.03497°N 2.36876°W	—	16th century	The cottage, which was later altered, is partly timber framed and partly in rendered and painted red brick. There is one storey and an attic, three bays, and a rear wing. The doorway has a gabled hood, the windows are casements with segmental heads, and there are three gabled dormers. Inside there is an inglenook fireplace.	II
Five Steps, Betley; 53.03427°N 2.36823°W	—	Early 17th century	A timber framed cottage with brick infill and a thatched roof. There is one storey and an attic, steps lead up to the doorway, the windows vary, and there are two dormers, one gabled, and the other an eyebrow dormer.	II
Ravenshall House; 53.02436°N 2.36917°W	—	Early 17th century	The house was remodelled in the 19th century. The earlier part is the rear wing, which is timber framed with brick infill, the main range is in red brick, and the roof is tiled. There are two storeys, and a T-shaped plan, consisting of a three-bay main range and a rear wing with an overhanging upper storey and a bracketed gable. The doorway has a gabled bracketed hood, the windows are casements, those in the ground floor with segmental heads, and to the left are garage doors.	II
The Steps, Betley; 53.03416°N 2.36822°W	—	Early 17th century	The cottage, which was later altered, is timber framed with alterations in brick, and a tile roof. There is one storey and an attic, and two bays. The central doorway has a segmental head, the windows are casements, also with segmental heads, and there are two gabled dormers.	II
The Steps, Ravenshall; 53.02409°N 2.36893°W	—	Early 17th century	A timber framed house with brick infill on a high brick plinth, some rebuilding in brick, and a tile roof. There is one storey and an attic, and three bays. Steps lead up to a central doorway that has a bracketed and gabled hood. The windows are casements, and there are two gabled dormers.	II
The Square, Betley; 53.03371°N 2.36852°W	—	17th century	The cottage was largely rebuilt in about 1830. It has a timber framed core, the rebuilding is in brick with shallow pilasters, and it has a tile roof. There are two storeys, three bays, and a rear wing. The central doorway has a reeded surround and a fanlight, and the windows are casements with segmental heads.	II
The Village Stores, Betley; 53.03379°N 2.36853°W	—	17th century	A house, at one time a shop, it was partly rebuilt in the 18th century and extended in the 19th century. The house is timber framed with brick infill, rebuilding and the extension in brick, and a tile roof. There are two storeys and an attic, two bays, and an extension. The gable end faces the street and has carved bargeboards. The doorway has a rectangular fanlight, to the left is a former shop window with a bracketed hood, and the windows above have moulded surrounds.	II
Tudor Cottage, Betley; 53.03575°N 2.36943°W	—	17th century	The cottage was later extended. The original part is timber framed on a plastered plinth, with painted brick infill, the extension is in brick painted to resemble timber framing, and the roof is tiled. There are two storeys, a main range of four bays, a two-storey extension to the right, and a low extension to the left. Most of the windows are casements.	II
Tudor House, Betley; 53.03459°N 2.36835°W		17th century	The house was later extended. There are two storeys, three bays, and a rear wing, giving an L-shaped plan. The left two bays are timber framed with brick infill on a brick plinth, repairs and the right bay are in brick, and the roof is tiled. On the front are two doors, the windows are casements, and there are three gabled dormers.	II
Rose Cottage, Betley; 53.03592°N 2.36910°W	—	Late 17th century	The cottage was extended in the 20th century. The original part is timber framed with plastered brick infill, the extension is in painted brick, and the roof is tiled. There are two storeys and an attic, and the gable end faces the street. In the gabled end is a gabled porch, and the windows are casements with bracketed hoods.	II
Walnut Cottage, Betley; 53.03598°N 2.36869°W		Late 17th century	A timber framed cottage with brick infill, some replacement in brick, and a tile roof. There is one storey and an attic, and one bay, with the gable end facing the street. The windows are casements.	II
Summer House, Wrinehill; 53.01988°N 2.36841°W		c. 1700	A red brick house with stone dressings on a moulded plinth, with a floor band, giant pilasters, a moulded eaves cornice, and a tile roof. There are two storeys, an attic and a basement, and a front of three bays with a pedimented gable containing a window flanked by rusticated strips. The central doorway is approached by steps with railings, and it has a moulded surround, a fanlight, and a segmental pediment. Most of the windows are sashes with segmental heads, moulded architraves and sills, and raised keystones, and in the basement are blocked circular windows.	II*
Betley Court, dovecote, and forecourt walls and gates 53.03233°N 2.36905°W		1716	A large house, it was expanded in the late 18th century by George Wilkinson, altered in 1809 by John Nash, and further altered and extended in the late 19th and early 20th century by W. D. Caröe. The house is built in red and blue chequered brick, and has hipped slate roofs. There is a main block with two storeys, a roughly square plan, and three wings. The entrance front has five bays, a floor band, giant pilasters, and a moulded eaves cornice. The middle three bays project forward under a parapet with moulded coping, a central achievement, and five urns. In front is a two-storey porch three-bay porch that has a lintel grooved as voussoirs, and a raised keystone. Above is a sash window, two niches with statuettes, and a cornice. On the sides of the house are two-storey bow windows. At the rear is a two-storey four-bay range linking the house to a dovecote that has oval windows, a hipped slate roof, and an octagonal cupola with a lead dome and an iron weathervane. In front of the house the forecourt is enclosed by low walls with railings, wrought iron gates and square gate piers.	II*
Bank House, Betley; 53.03439°N 2.36830°W	—	Early 18th century	The house is built in red brick with blue headers on a plinth, with a floor band and a tile roof. There are two storeys, three bays, and a single-storey single-bay extension on the left. The windows are casements, and in the extension is a shop window.	II
Cottage adjoining The Beeches, Betley; 53.03580°N 2.36898°W	—	Early to mid 18th century	The rebuilding of an earlier house incorporating some 16th–17th timber framed material, it is in red brick with blue headers, and has a tile roof. There is one storey and an attic, and two bays. The central doorway has a bracketed pediment hood, the windows are casements, the window to the right of the doorway with a fluted architrave, and there are two gabled dormers.	II
The Old Post Office, plinth and gate piers, Betley; 53.03350°N 2.36847°W	—	Early to mid 18th century	The house was altered in about 1870, in about 1880, and in the 20th century. It is in red brick on a plinth, with modillion eaves and a tile roof. There are three storeys, four bays, and a rear lean-to. On the front is a porch containing a doorway with a fanlight, a window to the right, and a balcony with a balustrade, and the windows are casements with segmental heads. In front of the garden is a chamfered blue brick plinth containing a pair of square brick gate piers with pyramidal stone caps.	II
Dovecote and cartshed west of Betley Old Hall; 53.03840°N 2.37243°W	—	18th century	The dovecote and cartshed are in red brick, with a dentilled eaves band, and a hipped tile roof. There are two storeys, and they contain a round-headed cartshed entrance to the west, and dovecote openings to the east, one with a segmental head. Inside the upper floor are nesting boxes.	II
Bowhill House and Farmhouse, Betley; 53.03404°N 2.36870°W		Mid 18th century	A pair of houses in red and blue brick, with floor bands, pilaster strips, and a tile roof. There are three storeys and six bays. Steps lead up to the doorway, which has engaged Doric columns, a radial fanlight, and an open pediment. The windows are sashes, those in the ground floor are tripartite.	II
Tower View, Betley; 53.03292°N 2.36804°W	—	Mid 18th century	A red brick house with blue brick headers, a floor band, a dentilled eaves band, and a tile roof. There are two storeys and three bays. The central doorway has a rectangular fanlight, the windows are cross casements, and the door and windows have wedge lintels.	II
Wrinehill Bridge; 53.01687°N 2.36571°W	—	18th century	The bridge carries the A531 road over Checkley Brook. It is in red brick and consists of a single segmental arch. The bridge has a stone parapet band, and a stone coped parapet. On the east side it is flanked by pilaster buttresses, and on the west side by stepped buttresses that have stone caps.	II
Shade House, plinth and gate piers, Betley; 53.03357°N 2.36850°W	—	Mid to late 18th century	The house, which was later altered, is in red brick with a tile roof. There are three storeys, a gabled bay facing the street, and three bays on the sides. On the front is a canted bay window, and casement windows in the upper floors. On the right return is a porch with a hipped roof. The front garden is enclosed by a chamfered blue brick plinth, and it contains square red and blue brick gate piers with pyramidal stone caps.	II
Beech Wood, Betley; 53.03477°N 2.36837°W	—	Late 18th century	A red brick house with a dentilled eaves band, a slate roof, three storeys, and three bays. The central doorway has pilasters, a radial fanlight, and an open pediment. The windows in the lower two floors are windows, and in the top floor they are sashes.	II
Fir Tree Cottage, plinth and gate piers, Betley; 53.03341°N 2.36842°W	—	Late 18th century (probable)	The house was remodelled in about 1880, and altered in the 20th century. It is in red brick with dentilled eaves and a tile roof, and has two storeys and three bays. In the right bay is a porch, above it is a sash window, and the other windows are casements, all with segmental heads. The front garden is enclosed by a chamfered blue brick plinth, and it contains square red and blue brick gate piers with pyramidal stone caps.	II
Bow House, Betley; 53.03401°N 2.36751°W	—	Late 18th to early 19th century	The house is in red brick with blue brick headers, and has a dentilled eaves band, and a tile roof. There are two storeys, an attic and a basement, and three bays. In the right bay is a full-height canted bay window, and the other windows are 20th-century casements. The central doorway is approached by steps, and has reeded Doric columns, a fanlight, and an open pediment.	II
Black Horse Inn, Betley; 53.03473°N 2.36874°W		Early 19th century	A house, formerly an inn, the main block is in rendered brick with a dentilled eaves band and a tile roof. There are two storeys and four bays. Above the central doorway is a panel with a cornice, to the left is a tripartite sash window, and the other windows are casements. To the right is a brick wing with one storey and an attic, two bays, a doorway with a flat hood on shaped brackets, casement windows with segmental heads and two gabled dormers. To the left is another wing that has two storeys and two bays.	II
Bridge and weir, Betley Hall Gardens; 53.03719°N 2.36658°W	—	Early 19th century	The bridge crosses a weir in Betley Hall Pond. It is in stone with a cast iron balustrade, and consists of a single segmental arch. The bridge has a plain parapet band, it is flanked by plasterer strips, and the abutments sweep forward, ending in square piers.	II
Model Farm, Betley Old Hall; 53.03786°N 2.37229°W		Early 19th century	The model farm complex contains cowsheds, cart sheds, a granary, stables and a watermill, and is in red brick with tile roofs. It is built on a slope and consists of four ranges around a farm yard, mainly with two storeys. The watermill contains an undershot wheel.	II*
Pigsties southwest of Betley Old Hall; 53.03778°N 2.37193°W	—	Early 19th century	The pigsties are in red and blue brick with a tile roof. There is one storey and four bays. Each pigsty has a segmental-headed opening, and a walled yard in front with a feeding chute and a wooden gate.	II
Smithy west of Betley Old Hall; 53.03865°N 2.37268°W	—	Early 19th century	The smithy is in red brick with a tile roof. There is a single storey, and it contains two windows and a carriage entrance, all with segmental heads.	II
The Croft and Prospect House, Ravenshall; 53.02870°N 2.36789°W	—	Early 19th century	A red brick house, divided into two, with a tile roof. There are three storeys, two parallel ranges, three bays, and a two-storey, one-bay right wing. In the centre are paired doors, and the windows are sashes with wedge lintels.	II
The Beeches, Betley; 53.03565°N 2.36884°W	—	c. 1840	A brick cottage with a tile roof, two storeys, and three bays. The central doorway has a pediment, and the windows are casements with stuccoed lintels and keystones.	II
Milepost south of The Hand and Trumpet Public House, Ravenshall; 53.02236°N 2.36927°W		19th century	The milepost is on the west side of the A531 road. It is in cast iron and has a triangular plan and a chamfered top. The milepost is inscribed with the distances to Betley, Basford, Nantwich, Newcastle-under-Lyme, and Keele.	II
Milepost in front of Whitegates, Betley; 53.03635°N 2.36913°W		19th century	The milepost is on the west side of the A531 road. It is in cast iron and has a triangular plan, a sloping top, and a round head. On the top is "BETLEY PARISH", and on the sides are the distances to Basford, Nantwich, Newcastle-under-Lyme, and Keele.	II
Clock House and Mews House, Betley; 53.03293°N 2.36890°W	—	1870	The houses originated as the stable block and the coach house for Betley Court, and were altered in the 20th century. They are in red and blue chequered brick with slate roofs. There are two storeys, and the houses form an L-shaped plan, with two ranges at right angles. At the junction is a square clock tower that has a belfry with a spire. The coach house contains four segmental arches, and most of the windows date from the 20th century, those in the ground floor with segmental heads.	II
Abrahams House and Rose View, plinth and gate piers, Betley; 53.03327°N 2.36840°W	—	1879	A pair of estate cottages in red brick with dressings in blue brick and stone, they are on a plinth, and have quoins, a floor band, dentilled eaves, and a gabled and hipped tile roof. There are two storeys and a front of three bays. The left bay projects under a hipped roof and contains casement windows. The two right bays are gabled, they contain casement windows, in the right gable is a datestone, and there is a doorway to the right. In the left return is a porch with a hood, and on the sides and at the rear some of the windows are sashes. Across the front of the cottages is a blue brick wall plinth, and square brick gate piers with pyramidal stone caps.	II
Lime View, plinth and gate pier, Betley; 53.03310°N 2.36836°W	—	1880	An estate cottage in red brick with dressings in blue brick and stone, it is on a plinth, and has quoins, a floor band, dentilled eaves, and a gabled and hipped tile roof. There are two storeys and two bays, and a T-shaped plan. The left bay projects, it is gabled and contains casement windows and a datestone in the gable. The right bay contains a porch with a hood, a sash window to the right, and a three-light mullioned window above. To the right of the house is a blue brick wall plinth, and a square brick gate pier with a pyramidal stone cap.	II
Telephone kiosk, Betley; 53.03489°N 2.36869°W	—	1935	A K6 type telephone kiosk, designed by Giles Gilbert Scott. Constructed in cast iron with a square plan and a dome, it has three unperforated crowns in the top panels.	II
