= Princethorpe =

Village in Warwickshire, England

Coordinates: 52.333501°N 1.411314°W

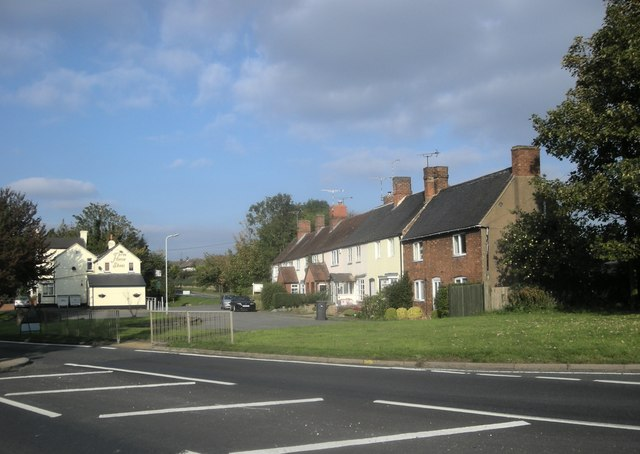
- Buildings in Princethorpe

- Location within Warwickshire
- Population: 429 (2021)
- OS grid reference: SP4068
- Civil parish: Princethorpe
- District: Rugby
- Shire county: Warwickshire
- Region: West Midlands
- Country: England
- Sovereign state: United Kingdom
- Post town: RUGBY
- Postcode district: CV23
- Dialling code: 01926
- Police: Warwickshire
- Fire: Warwickshire
- Ambulance: West Midlands
- UK Parliament: Kenilworth and Southam

Princethorpe is a village and civil parish in the Rugby district of Warwickshire, England. In the 2011 census the parish had a population 376, increasing to 429 at the 2021 census.

Princethorpe is located roughly halfway between the towns of Rugby 6.5 miles (10.5 km) to the north-east, and Leamington Spa 6 miles (9.7 km) to the south-west. It is at the centre of a busy junction between the A423 (Coventry to Banbury), B4453 (Rugby to Leamington) and B4455 (Fosse Way) roads. The village once had a pub called the Three Horseshoes, which was in business continuously from at least 1816 until it closed in 2023. Situated on Leamington Road in the village is Our Lady's Primary School. It is a primary school with around 100 children between the ages of 4 and 11.

Just outside the village is Princethorpe College, a Roman Catholic school. The school incorporates the buildings of the former St. Mary's Priory, which was founded by French Benedictine nuns from Montargis who sought asylum from the French Revolution in 1792. After several moves, they settled in Princethorpe in 1832, and established a priory and school. In 1966 it was purchased by the Missionaries of the Sacred Heart who established it into its present form.

The village has a history extending to at least the Roman period, related to the fact that the Fosse Way, an old Roman road ran through it. Two Roman settlements existed just south of the current village. In the 1950s, a number of Roman coins were found in Princethorpe.

Its name likely derived from an Anglo-Saxon farmer called Pren. It was first mentioned in 1275–6. In the reign of Henry VI it came into the possession of the Hugford family of Emscote and stayed in that family until the reign of Henry VII when John Hugford sold it to Sir William Compton. Princethorpe was originally in the parish of Wolston but was made, for convenience, a separate parish with Stretton by an Act of Parliament in 1694 the reign of William III. Princethorpe is today still part of the ecclesiastical parish of Stretton-on-Dunsmore, but became a separate civil parish in 1866.

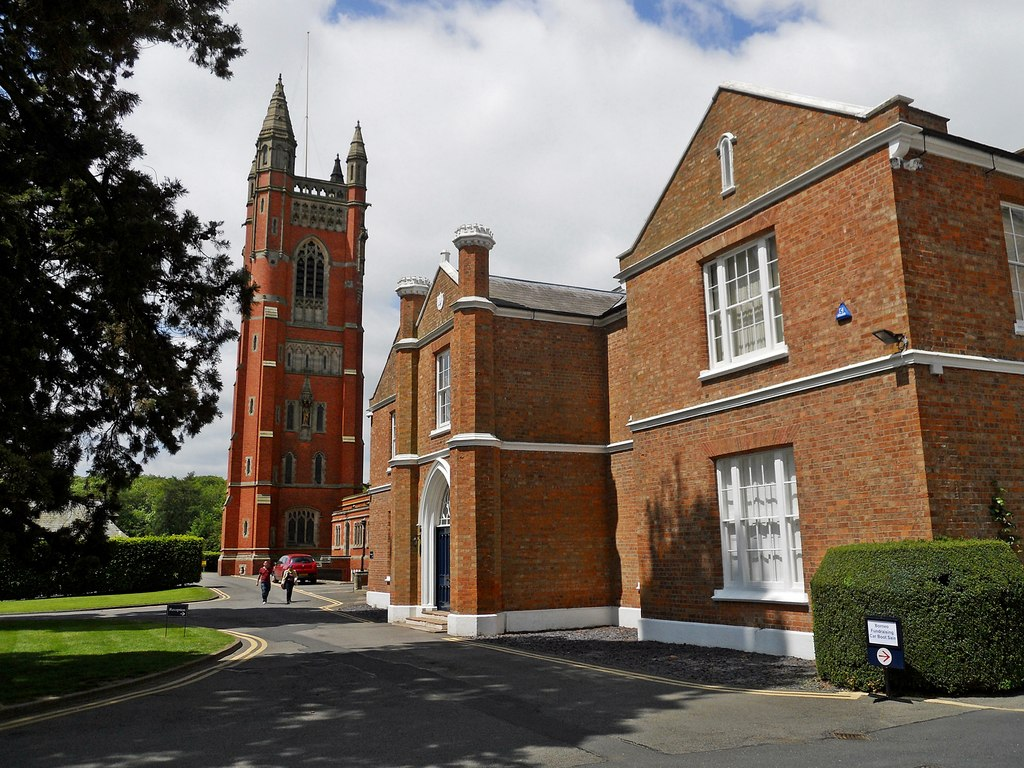
Princethorpe College

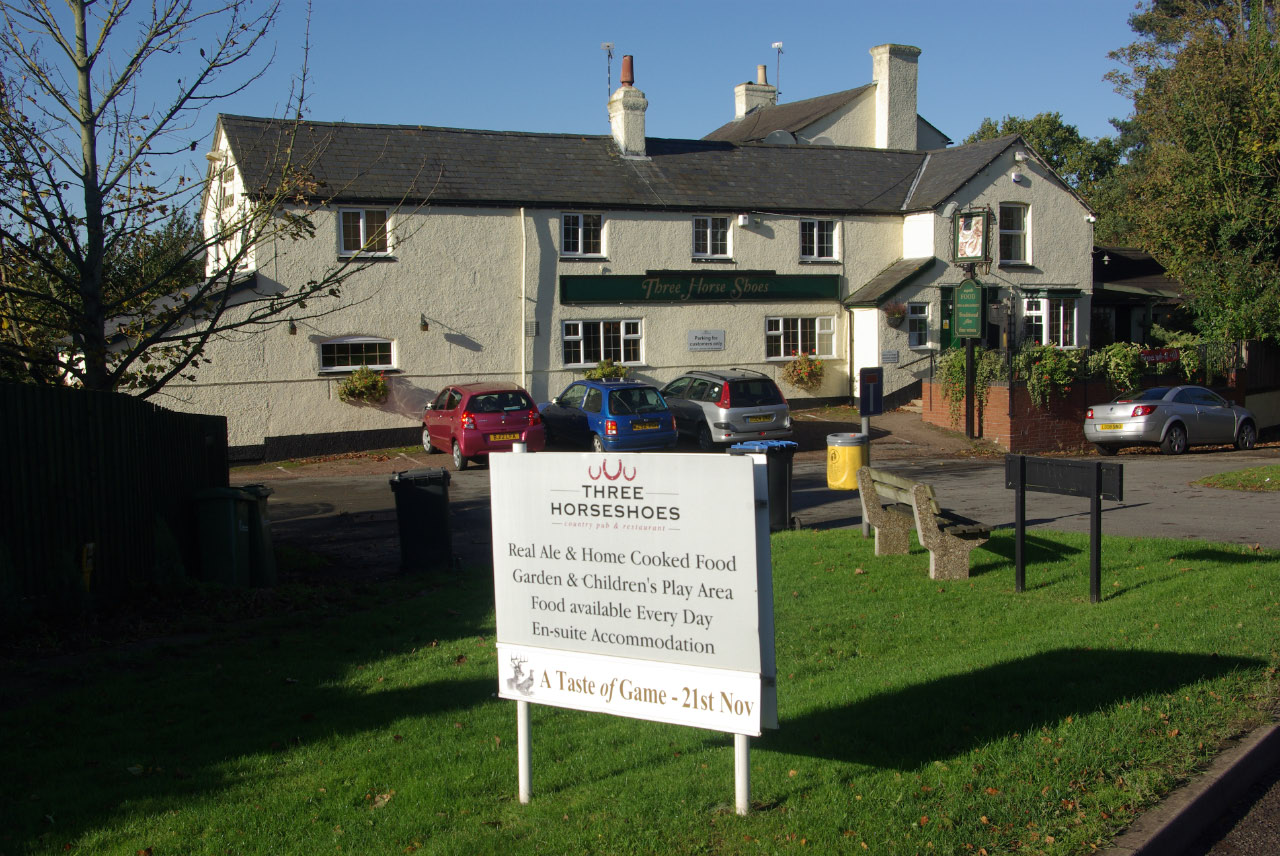
The Three Horseshoes, Princethorpe

== Notable people ==
Land-drainage reformer Joseph Elkington developed his drainage techniques while farming at Princethorpe.
