= Princethorpe College =

Independent day school in Princethorpe, Warwickshire, England

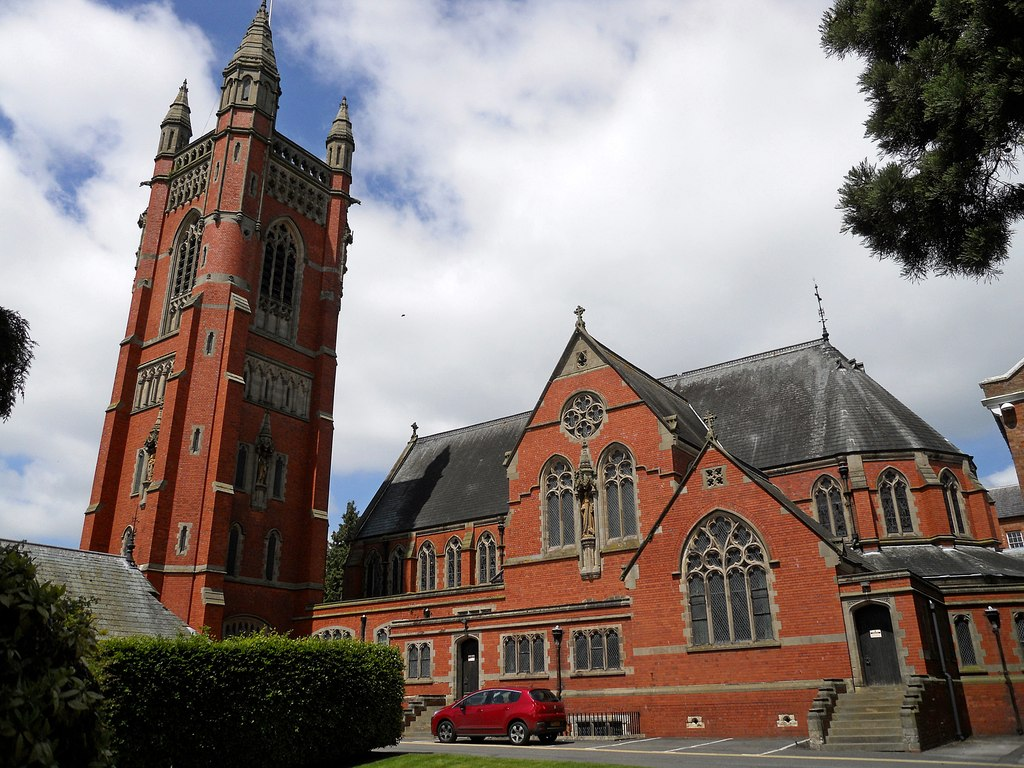

Location
- Princethorpe, Warwickshire, CV23 9PX; England; 52°20′09″N 1°25′19″W

Information
- Type: Private day school
- Motto: Christus Regnet (Let Christ Reign)
- Religious affiliation: Roman Catholic
- Established: 1966
- Headmaster: Grove du Toit
- Age: 11 to 18
- Enrolment: 900
- Houses: Austin, Benet, Fisher and More
- Former Pupils: Old Princethorpians
- Website: http://www.princethorpe.co.uk

Princethorpe College is a Catholic private day school located in Princethorpe, near Rugby, Warwickshire, England. Princethorpe College opened in September 1966 after the Missionaries of the Sacred Heart (MSCs), purchased the site to use as the senior school for their already established boys’ school, St Bede’s College in Leamington Spa. It occupies a former Benedictine monastery surrounded by 200 acres (0.81 km^{2}) of parkland.

== History ==
The college was founded by the Missionaries of the Sacred Heart and opened its doors in September 1966. Girls were first admitted into the sixth form in 1976. It became fully coeducational in 1995. It currently occupies the site of St Mary's Priory, which had been home to Benedictine nuns since 1792 before the house was disbanded in 2002.

In late 2007 a new £2.4 million dedicated Sixth Form Centre opened. Built around an atrium, the new building provides classrooms, a lecture room, common room, a Sixth Form dining room, coffee bar and a careers room and is linked to the main school building on two levels by a walkway.

In late 2014, a new £4.5 million teaching block named 'The Limes' was opened. This was built onto the side of the existing sports centre, and is linked on both floors. The Limes contains 2 new ICT rooms, new classrooms for Modern Foreign Languages, English & Sports Theory, and staff bases for English, Modern Foreign Languages, ICT and PE. It also contains 200+ lockers for pupils. Work was completed in September 2017 on the refurbishment of the College's Clarkson Theatre.

== Notable alumni ==
- Ian Bell (b. 1982) – cricketer, Warwickshire County Cricket Club, England cricket team
- Tom Hilditch (b. 1965) – journalist and magazine publisher
- Jordan King (b. 1994) – Formula One Development Driver
- Mark Lewis (b. 1987) – cricketer
- Tom Lewis (b. 1991) – cricketer, Warwickshire County Cricket Club
- Dominic Ostler (b. 1970) – cricketer, Warwickshire County Cricket Club
- Aaron Pressley (b. 2001) – professional footballer, Stevenage F.C.
- Richard Wilding (b. 1965) – academic and business professional
- Harry Jaggard (b. 1997) - travel content creator.
- Jonathan Gullis (b. 1990) - former Member of Parliament (Stoke-on-Trent North) & former Minister for School Standards, Department for Education
