= Betley Court =

Country house in Staffordshire, England

Coordinates: 53.0323°N 2.3690°W

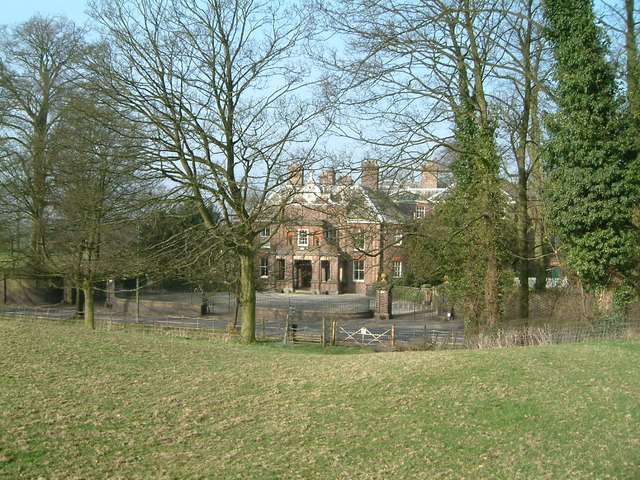
Betley Court

Betley Court is an 18th-century country house in the ancient village of Betley, near Newcastle-under-Lyme, Staffordshire. It is a Grade II* listed building.

The house was built for John Cradock in 1716 and was later altered by architect George Wilkinson. In 1783 extensive gardens, including parterres and water features, were laid out by William Emes. In 1809 the property was largely rebuilt in a two-storey seven bay Georgian style to designs by John Nash. It was further improved in the late 19th and early 20th centuries by architect Douglas Caroe.

The country house and estate passed by female descent to the Fenton and Fletcher families and as a result of the 1814 marriage of Elizabeth Fenton to Francis Twemlow, to the Fletcher-Twemlow family.

The house fell into disuse following the death in 1976 of Charles Fletcher-Twemlow. The Grade II listed stable block was converted to residential use and new houses were built in the grounds. New owners carried out extensive refurbishment to the House.

In 2008 the current owners launched a garden restoration not-for-profit membership organisation called 'The Emes Society' (after William Emes – see above) with the intention of looking after the 10-acre (40,000 m^{2}) garden and developing it for the 21st Century, with open days for the public including, e.g. a Bluebell Walk. The formal part of the garden includes a magnificent Cedar of Lebanon planted by William Barron.

On 23 August 2019 Betley Court suffered a devastating fire believed to have started in the roof space.
