= Wrinehill =

Village in Staffordshire, England

Coordinates: 53.0201°N 2.3699°W

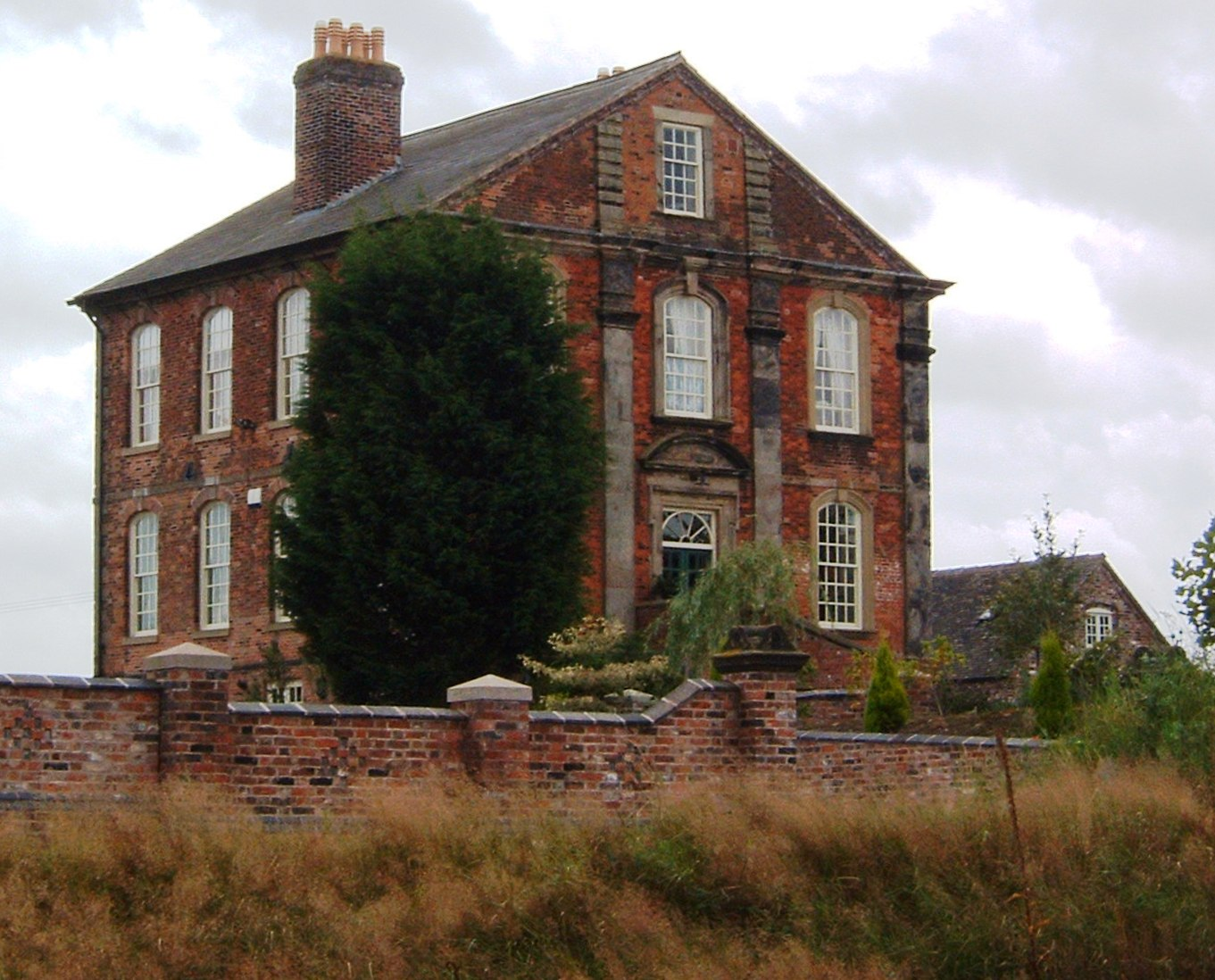
- Wrinehill Summerhouse

- Location within Staffordshire
- OS grid reference: SJ752470
- District: Newcastle-under-Lyme
- Shire county: Staffordshire
- Region: West Midlands
- Country: England
- Sovereign state: United Kingdom
- Post town: CREWE
- Postcode district: CW3
- Dialling code: 01270
- Police: Staffordshire
- Fire: Staffordshire
- Ambulance: West Midlands
- UK Parliament: Newcastle-under-Lyme

Wrinehill, also called Checkley cum Wrinehill, is a village in the north-west of Staffordshire on the A531 road lying adjacent to the southern border of Cheshire in the Borough of Newcastle-under-Lyme. The population taken at the 2011 census can be found under Betley. For many years it was claimed by both counties but reportedly came under official Staffordshire administration in 1965. It lies 1 mile south of and forms a continuous linear settlement with Betley.

The parish includes the Betley Mere SSSI.

== Architectural heritage ==
Wrinehill had two listed buildings of architectural interest. First, the early 16th century half-timbered Old Medicine House, which, when threatened with imminent demolition, was bought for £1, dismantled and rebuilt in 1971 at Blackden Heath, near Holmes Chapel in Cheshire.

Second, it is still home to the Wrinehill Summer House, a Grade II listed building dating from c.1700, formerly owned by the Earl of Wilton and now a private residence. Located on the main road opposite Blue Bell Close, the Summerhouse is a very impressive building; it "has three bays but, nevertheless, displays a grand facade with giant pilasters, pediments and segmented headed windows." It is "an old home of Thomas Egerton, 1st Earl of Wilton which has also been a barracks and a shop. It is built of brick on a stone base and inside is a handsome oak staircase...the flat roof, it is said, was for the Earl of Wilton to use as a view-point to watch the fox hunt." Sometime in the late 19th century it was the home of 'Johnson's Celebrated Ointment Manufactory.'

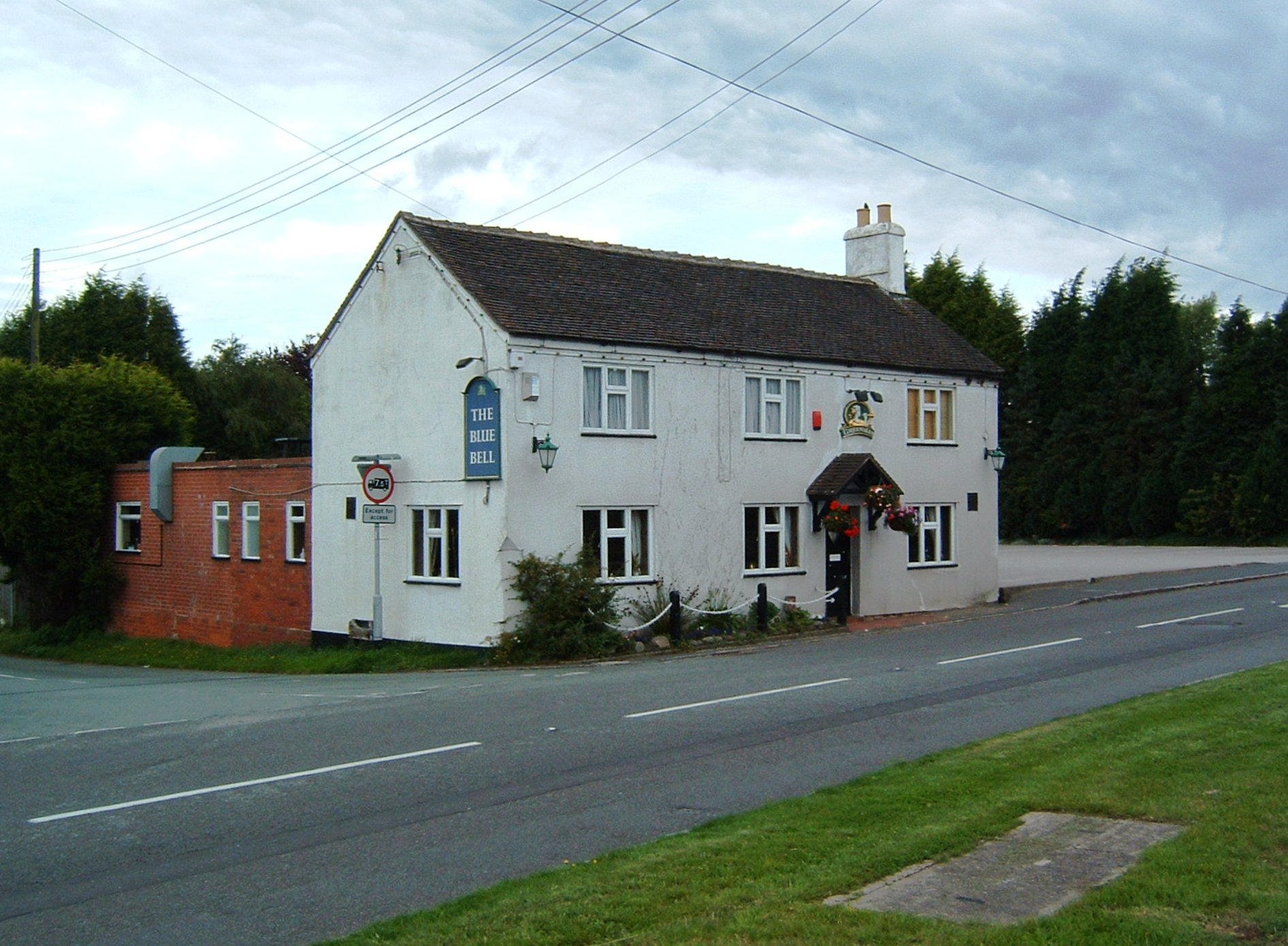
The Blue Bell Inn, Wrinehill, viewed from the south, August 2008; since demolished

Though a small village, Wrinehill formerly boasted 3 public houses: The Crown Inn, The Hand and Trumpet and the Blue Bell Inn (though the last has been demolished).

== See also ==
- Listed buildings in Betley
