= William Emes =

English landscape gardener

William Emes (1729 or 1730–13 March 1803) was an English landscape gardener.

== Biography ==
Details of his early life are not known but in 1756 he was appointed head gardener to Sir Nathaniel Curzon at Kedleston Hall, Derbyshire. He left this post in 1760 when Robert Adam was given responsibility for the entire management of the grounds. During his time at Kedleston he had started to alter the earlier formal nature of the park and had constructed the upper lake. Also during this time he married Mary Innocent, who was his servant and the daughter of a tailor. Together they had five sons and three daughters. His son John Emes who was born in 1762 was a successful engraver and silversmith.

After leaving Kedleston he moved to live in Bowbridge House, (Not Bowbridge Fields farm as previously thought) Mackworth. This was later the home of Edward Darwin (son of Erasmus Darwin, who was Emes' friend through the Lunar Society) where he developed his practice as a landscape designer, which was concentrated mainly in the Midlands and in north Wales. His style was similar to that of Lancelot 'Capability' Brown. At Eaton Hall, Cheshire, Emes was called in to replace Brown by Lord Grosvenor. He sometimes furnished a plan and then left the client to undertake the work. On other occasions he would supervise the work for many years, such as the gardens at Chirk Castle and at Erddig where his involvement continued for 25 years. Emes also designed a few minor buildings.

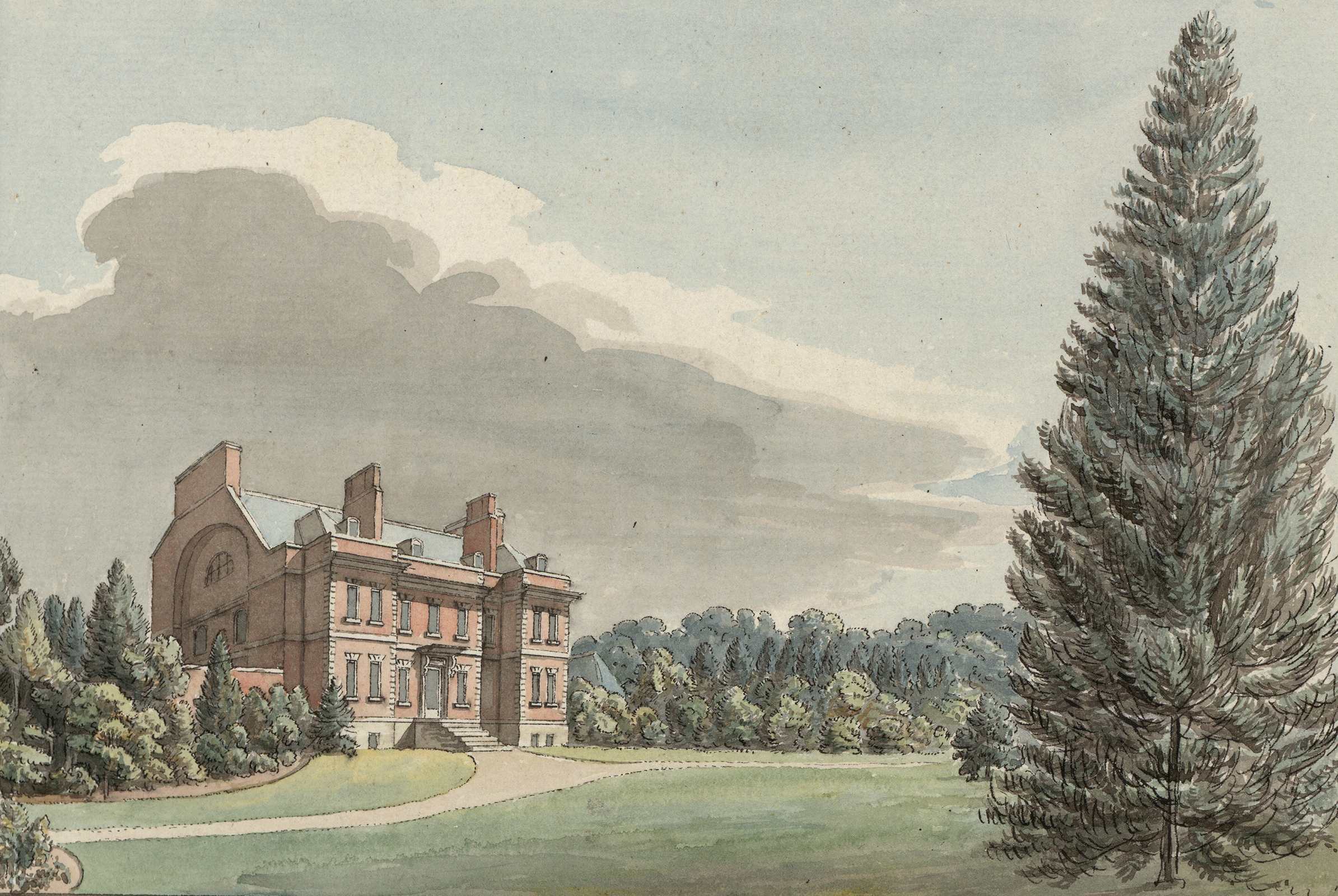
Grounds of Halston Hall, Whittington, c.1778

The main features of his designs were trees and water. Characteristic designs included serpentine lakes with their ends concealed in woodland, single trees and clumps of trees in parkland with tree belts round the boundary. He created flower gardens adjacent to the house at Sandon Hall, anticipating the later work of Humphry Repton.

His wife died in 1789 and Emes then moved to Hampshire taking a lease of Elvetham Park from Sir Henry Gough-Calthorpe. Here he took commissions in the south of England, sometimes in partnership with John Webb, formerly his foreman. He later moved to London where he died at Vicarage House, St Giles Cripplegate, the home of his daughter, Sarah. He was buried at St Giles Cripplegate.

== Designs ==
=== Buildings ===
- Lodge at Attingham Hall, Shropshire
- Greenhouse at Penrice Castle, Glamorgan

=== Gardens ===
In whole or in part:

==== Cambridgeshire ====
- Wimpole Hall (walled garden) (1790)
- Chippenham (1795)

==== Cheshire ====
- Tatton Hall (1768)
- Crewe Hall (1769)
- Oulton Hall (1770)
- Peover Hall
- Eaton Hall
- Cholmondeley Hall (1777)
- Arley Hall (c.1760 and then 1787)

==== Derbyshire ====
- Kedleston (1756–1760)
- Calke Abbey (1776)
- Markeaton Hall
- Shipley Hall
- Darley Park
- Radbourne Hall (1790)
- Locko Hall (1792)

==== Gloucestershire ====
- Daylesford House
- Dodington House (1793)
- Fairford Park (1783–87)

==== Greater Manchester ====
- Platt Hall (1768)
- Heaton Hall (1770)

==== Hampshire ====
- Brockenhurst Park
- Dogmersfield Park
- Elvetham Hall

==== Lancashire ====
- Claughton Hall, Garstang

==== Lincolnshire ====
- Belton House

==== Norfolk ====
- Holkham Hall

==== Nottinghamshire ====
- Kirklington Hall (1774)
- Carlton Hall, Carlton in Lindrick (1783)

==== Shropshire ====
- Walcot Park (c. 1774)
- Halston Hall (1770s)
- Aston Hall (near Oswestry) (1780)
- Badger Hall and Dingle (c. 1780)
- Dudmaston Hall
- Millichope Park
- Oakly Park
- Hawkstone Park (lake)
- Cheswardine Hall, Chipnall

==== Staffordshire ====
- Ingestre
- Sandon (1767)
- Keele Hall (1768–1770)
- Oakedge (1771)
- Beaudesert House
- Cuffnell
- Statfold (1777)
- Sandon Hall (1781–1782)
- Etruria Hall
- Betley Court

==== Wiltshire ====
- Chute
- Bowood House

==== Yorkshire ====
- Cave Castle (1787–1791)

==== Wales ====
- Chirk Castle, Denbighshire (1764–75)
- Erddig, Denbighshire (1768–89)
- Llanrhaeadr Hall, Denbighshire (1771)
- Hawarden Old Rectory, Flintshire (1774)
- Gregynog, Montgomeryshire (1774)
- Powis Castle, Montgomeryshire
- Penrice Castle, Glamorganshire
- Margam Park, Glamorganshire
- Rhiwlas, Montgomeryshire
