= Mark Lewis (cricketer) =

English cricketer

Personal information
- Full name: Mark Fenn Lewis
- Born: 13 October 1987 (age 39); Coventry, Warwickshire, England
- Height: 6 ft 2 in (1.88 m)
- Batting: Right-handed
- Bowling: Right-arm medium
- Relatives: Tom Lewis (brother)

Domestic team information
- Years: Team
- 2009: Oxford UCCE

Career statistics
Competition	First-class
Matches	1
Runs scored	74
Batting average	–
100s/50s	–/1
Top score	74*
Catches/stumpings	–/–
- Source: Cricinfo, 16 July 2020

Mark Fenn Lewis (born 13 October 1987) is an English former first-class cricketer.

Lewis was born at Coventry and was educated at Princethorpe College, before going up to Oxford Brookes University. While studying at Oxford Brookes, he made a single appearance in first-class cricket for Oxford UCCE against Glamorgan at Oxford in 2009. (Note: Oxford UCCE differed from Oxford University Cricket Club in that it was open to students at Oxford Brookes University, whereas Oxford University Cricket Club is exclusively for students of the constituent colleges of the University of Oxford.) Batting once in the match, he scored an unbeaten 74 in the Oxford UCCE first innings, which was the highest score in the innings. His brother, Tom, played Twenty20 cricket for Warwickshire.
