= Sai Kung & Clearwater Bay Magazine =

Monthly lifestyle magazine published in Hong Kong

- June 2011 cover of Sai Kung & Clearwater Bay Magazine'
- Editor: Jane Steer
- Frequency: Monthly
- Circulation: 31,000 Readership
- Publisher: Tom Hilditch
- First issue: October 1, 2009
- Company: Fast Media Ltd
- Country: Hong Kong
- Based in: Sai Kung
- Language: English
- Website: saikung.com

Sai Kung & Clearwater Bay Magazine is a free-distributed English-language lifestyle magazine published in Hong Kong by Hong Kong Living Ltd. (formerly Fast Media Ltd). Premiering in 2009, the magazine targets highly-affluent professionals who work in Hong Kong but raise their families in the more spacious coastal suburbs the territory. It offers living advice, parenting and education advice, property news as well as exploring outdoor activities and local entertainment listings. It is also well known for its aerial photos. New issues are distributed on the first day of each month. It has a claimed readership of 31,000.

== History ==
Sai Kung & Clearwater Bay Magazine was founded by Tom Hilditch. The first issue was called simply Sai Kung Magazine, and was published in October 2009 by local private company, Hong Kong Living Ltd. It had 36 pages. In January 2010 the title was changed to "Sai Kung & Clearwater Bay Magazine". In June 2010 the magazine had 60 pages. In 2019, the magazine celebrated 10 years of business.

== Distribution ==
Sai Kung & Clearwater Bay Magazine is distributed free at around 100 venues including restaurants, bars, coffee shops, bookshops, country clubs, private residential complexes and international schools. Piles of Sai Kung Magazine displayed in acrylic stands are a common sight in Sai Kung bars, restaurants and country clubs in the early days of each month.

== Readership ==
The magazine prints 10,000 copies per month and claims around 31,000 readers per month.

According to a survey conducted by Sai Kung & Clearwater Bay Magazine in 2010, 88% of the readers are holders of at least one university degree and 80% earn more than HK$100,000 per month. 78% have children of school age. (Source: Sai Kung & Clearwater Bay Readership Survey).

== Contents ==
Sai Kung Magazine usually contains lifestyle features about local events, dining, property, boating, hiking, parenting and local environment issues.

=== Regular Main Sections ===
Letters
Letters from readers. There may be comments or thoughts about past issues of the magazine or opinions towards social issue, etc.
Planner
Listings of local events and happenings.
News
Reports of local interest and community news.
Local Hero
An interview section that features celebrated residents. Past interviewees have included Sir David Tang, Jill Robinson, Kenneth Bi and Wayne Parfitt
Dining
This section includes features and reviews on restaurants and cafes, introducing the latest news on where to find delicacies in Sai Kung & Clearwater Bay. There are usually recommendations of an indoor, an outdoor and a new restaurant in every issue. Sometimes, there will be a collection of recommendations from a particular area or cuisine.
Property
Usually the story of an upscale family house that has been redesigned or renovated.
Schools
A look at some local or international school or after-school activity.
Family
Columns and advice about coping with children and parenting.
Health & Beauty
News, features and reviews of local spas and health studios.
Pets
A column by Dr Pauline, a well known local vet.
Zim City
A column by Paul Zimmerman exploring ideas for better community living Hong Kong.
Gardening
A column by Jane Ram, which the magazine claims is "the only gardening column in Hong Kong", a city otherwise dominated by skyscrapers.
Marketplace
An advertising section with no editorial except for an extensive local "Directory of Shops & Services".
The Back Page
A monthly column written by former Observer Asia Correspondent and veteran Sai Kung resident Stephen Vines.

== Publisher ==
Sai Kung & Clearwater Bay Magazine is a publication of Hong Kong Living Limited.

== See also ==
- Media in Hong Kong
