= Betley =

Village in Staffordshire, England

Coordinates: 53.0334°N 2.3672°W

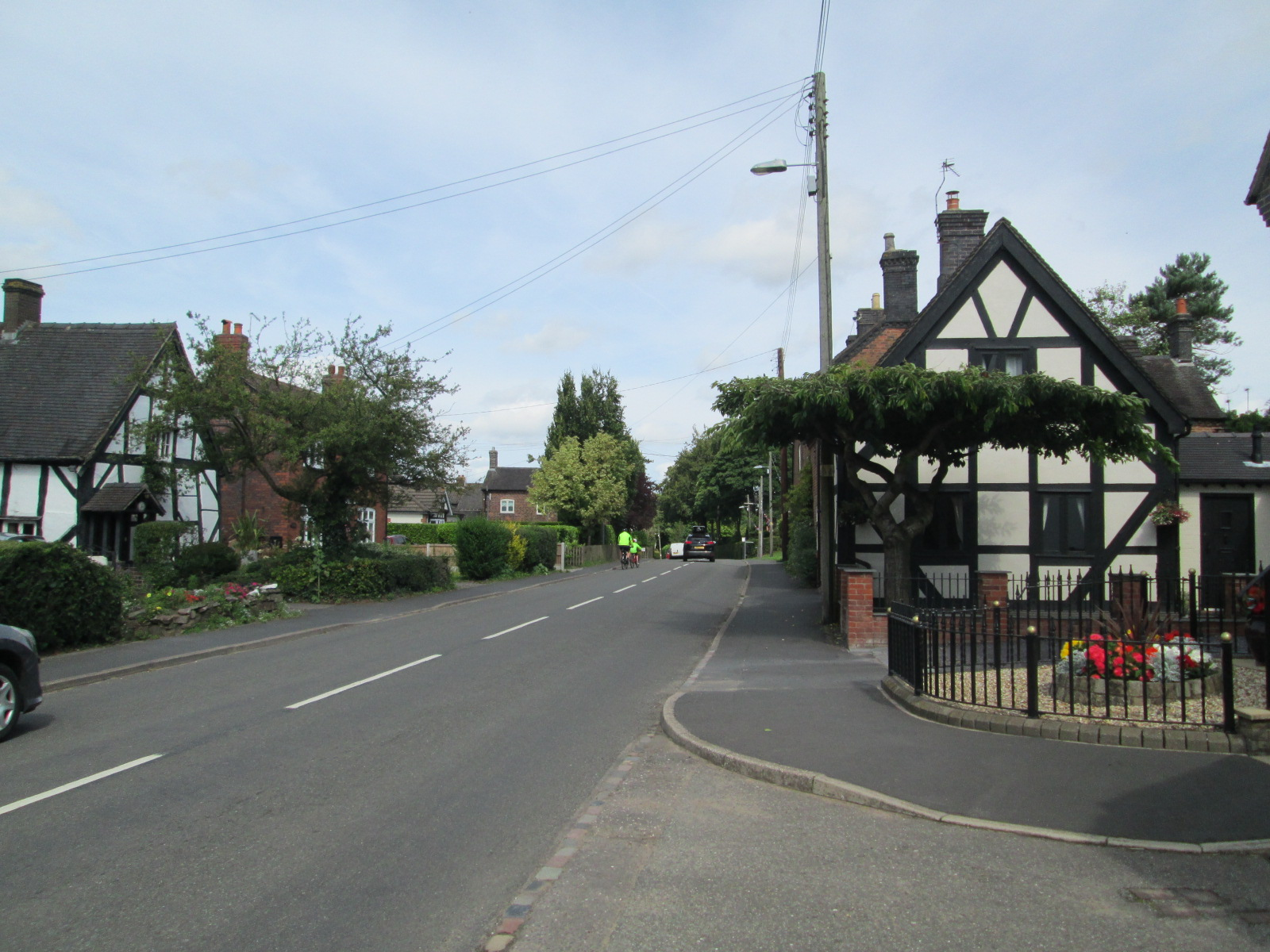
- The main road through Betley

- Location within Staffordshire
- Population: 1,033 (2011 Census)
- OS grid reference: SJ754485
- Civil parish: Betley, Balterley and Wrinehill
- District: Newcastle-under-Lyme
- Shire county: Staffordshire
- Region: West Midlands
- Country: England
- Sovereign state: United Kingdom
- Post town: CREWE
- Postcode district: CW3
- Dialling code: 01270
- Police: Staffordshire
- Fire: Staffordshire
- Ambulance: West Midlands
- UK Parliament: Newcastle-under-Lyme

Betley is a village and civil parish in the borough of Newcastle-under-Lyme in Staffordshire, England, about halfway between the town of Newcastle-under-Lyme and Nantwich. Betley forms a continual linear settlement with Wrinehill.

== School ==
- Betley School

== Transport ==
Betley lies on the A531 from Madeley to Weston. There is an hourly bus service, run by D&G Bus (route 85) which runs through Betley from Hanley and Newcastle-under-Lyme to Crewe and Nantwich.

== History ==
Betley – meaning the 'clearing in the woods' of Bette (a Saxon woman's name) – is an ancient settlement. It is mentioned in the Domesday Book. It is one of several local villages – including Buddileigh, Audley, and Madeley – which seem to be named after women. It had a major market, the charter for which was granted in the thirteenth century. At Betley Hall, a now-demolished country house, Charles Darwin conducted some of his zoological observations and Florence Nightingale visited. At another country house in the village, Betley Court (which is still standing), lived the Romantic poet Elizabeth Tollet. The church, dedicated to St Margaret of Antioch, is a beautiful medieval building (reasonably well-restored by George Gilbert Scott), with oak beams and a cricket ground to the rear.

== See also ==
- Betley Court

== Nearby places ==
- Audley
- Barthomley
- Crewe
- Madeley
- Nantwich
- Shavington
- Wrinehill

== Twin towns ==
Betley is twinned with:

- Agny, France

== See also ==
- Listed buildings in Betley
- Henry Hulme Warburton
