= Hong Kong Island Magazine =

Hong Kong lifestyle magazine

- October 2012 Hong Kong Island Magazine Cover
- Frequency: Monthly
- Publisher: Tom Hilditch
- First issue: October 1, 2012
- Company: Fast Media Ltd
- Country: Hong Kong
- Based in: Hong Kong
- Language: English
- Website: Hong Kong Island Magazine

Hong Kong Island Magazine is a free-distributed English language lifestyle magazine. It is a Hong Kong–based English-language monthly published by Fast Media Ltd. The magazine targets highly-affluent professionals, aged 28 to 58 years old, who work in Hong Kong and live in Central, Soho and the Mid-Levels. It offers living advice, parenting and education advice, property news as well as exploring outdoor activities and local entertainment listings. New issues are distributed on the first day of each month. The magazine is mailed free to subscribers whose homes are valued HK$15 million or more. It is also distributed in select residential towers, private members clubs, spas, coffee shops and English language schools. It has a claimed readership of 60,000.
