= Tom Hilditch =

British journalist (born 1965)

Tom Hilditch (born 1965 in United Kingdom) is a journalist and magazine publisher based in Hong Kong.

He grew up in Warwickshire, England and was educated at Princethorpe College and Manchester University. He began his career as a trainee reporter at The Rugby Advertiser in 1987, before working for Fleet Street News Agency and The Sun newspaper in 1989.

In 1997, as UK editor-in-chief of Penthouse Magazine he oversaw an attempt to rebrand the magazine as PH.UK and reposition it as a middle-shelf "adult magazine for grown-ups". Fashion photographers from The Face and Vogue Magazine, such as Corinne Day, Iain McKell and Ben Westwood, were hired to provide images. The attempt, which generated considerable media interest at the time, failed.

Hilditch returned to Asia in 1998. His writing was sometimes controversial. His longform investigations into the plight of the Thai Elephant, The Hello Kitty Murders, methamphetamine abuse and other topics have been widely published in magazines including British Esquire, The Sunday Times, GQ, Maxim, Marie Claire, The Independent on Sunday, Stern, US Playboy and Asiaweek.

From 2004 to 2008, he was Group Editorial Director of Asia City Publishing which produces free listings magazines HK Magazine, Where Hong Kong, Where Macau, as well as several books and guides. In 2004, in collaboration with publisher Stephen Freeman, he conceived and launched The List Magazine, a resource magazine for Hong Kong people. During a holiday break in 2007, he reported eye-witness accounts of the Burmese Saffron Revolution and its brutal crackdown. Hilditch resigned from Asia City Publishing shortly afterwards. The following year he founded the media company that became Hong Kong Living Ltd which publishes a number of books and lifestyle magazines including Hong Kong Island Magazine, Sai Kung & Clearwater Bay Magazine, Expat Parent Magazine, Mid Levels Magazine and Southside & The Peak Magazine

In March 2019, he co-launched a controversial campaign to lobby the Foreign Correspondents' Club of Hong Kong to drop its anti-harassment policy citing free speech.
