= Stretton-on-Dunsmore =

Village in Warwickshire, England

Coordinates: 52.34996°N 1.40244°W

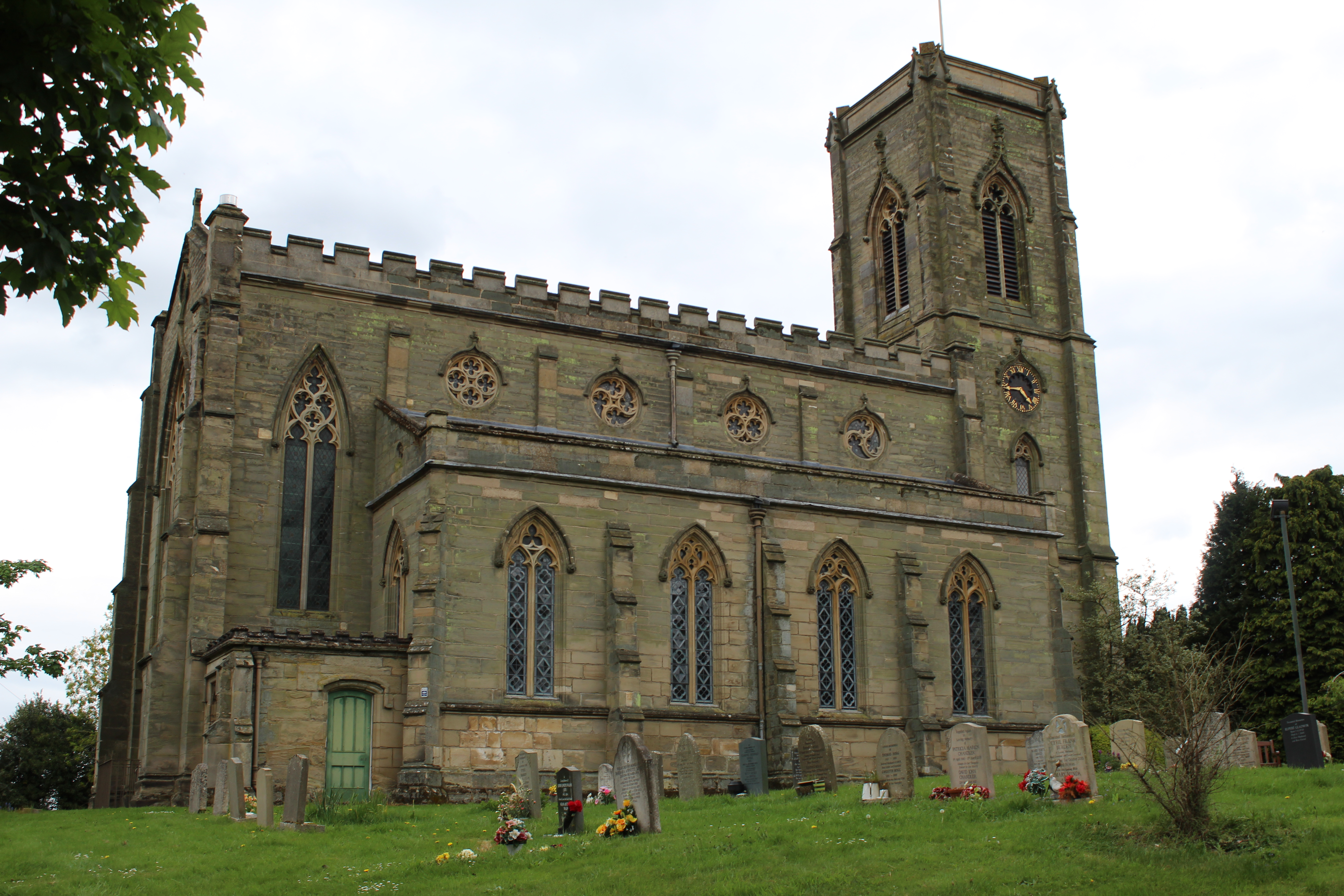
- All Saints' church in Stretton-On-Dunsmore

- Location within Warwickshire
- Population: 1,175 (2021)
- OS grid reference: SP408726
- Civil parish: Stretton-on-Dunsmore
- District: Rugby
- Shire county: Warwickshire
- Region: West Midlands
- Country: England
- Sovereign state: United Kingdom
- Post town: RUGBY
- Postcode district: CV23
- Dialling code: 024
- Police: Warwickshire
- Fire: Warwickshire
- Ambulance: West Midlands
- UK Parliament: Kenilworth and Southam

Stretton-on-Dunsmore is a village and civil parish in the English county of Warwickshire. Its population in the 2001 Census was recorded as 1,143, rising slightly to 1,159 at the 2011 census, increasing again to 1,175 in the 2021 census. In the 19th century the population was 634. The village is situated just south of the A45 road, in the countryside between Rugby and Coventry. Administratively, Stretton is part of the Borough of Rugby. Stretton means "settlement on a Roman Road" (from the Old English stræt and tun). In this case the road is Fosse Way. This site is referred to in the Domesday Book.

== History ==
In the reign of William the Conqueror the manor of Stratone on Dunsmore was owned by Roger de Montgomery. It was five hides in area and possessed an ancient mill called Purmulne, later called Pirrey Mill, which was given to the monks of Coombe Abbey by Robert de Chetwolde. The title Lord of the manor of Stratone on Dunsmore is an old Norman title dating from 1086. In the reign of Edward I the manor was sold by Thomas Garshale to Robert de Herig, who soon afterwards sold it to Henry de Hastings for 30 silver marks and a pair of white gloves or 1d paid annually at Easter.

It was afterwards held by the Bray family and through marriage to Henry Starkey who sold it to Lady Longvile. In 1620 it was purchased by Richard Taylor of Binley. The current title, recognized in law under the Law of Property Act 1925, is held by Niel Morley: Lord of Stretton on Dunsmore. In 1915 King George V reviewed the troops of the 29th Division on the London Road (now the A45) just north of the village before they were sent to Gallipoli. A large Portland stone obelisk on a roundabout of the A45 commemorates the review.

== Parish church ==
Stretton-upon-Dunsmore Parish Church Act 1833
- Act of Parliament
- Parliament of the United Kingdom
- Long title: An Act for taking down the Parish Church of Stretton-upon-Dunsmore in the County of Warwick and Diocese of Lichfield and Coventry, and building a new Church in lieu thereof.
- Citation: 3 & 4 Will. 4. c. xx

Dates
- Royal assent: 20 April 1833

Text of statute as originally enacted

The parish church of All Saints formerly contained a chantry chapel founded by Thomas de Wolvardynton, Parson of Lobenham in Leicestershire. He "bequeathed monies for two priests to sing Mass daily at the altar of St Thomas the Martyr for the good estates of himself and the Earl of Huntington". Edward III granted to the founders of the chantry chapel "four acres of meadow land, three acres of wood and 20 pounds rent per annum". In the reign of Richard II licence was granted to Robert de Stretton, then Bishop of Coventry and Lichfield, land and rents so that "a priest sing Mass daily in the chapel for the good estate of the King and for the health of his soul when he should depart this life, and for the soul of the King's father and grandfather." It is thought that the Bishop took his name from Stretton, having first been a Canon of Lichfield and Chaplain to the Black Prince, Richard II's father.

== Notable people ==
Land drainage reformer Joseph Elkington was baptised at Stretton in 1740 and farmed nearby.

The parents of Frank Whittle lived at 'Lyndale', on Rugby Lane from 1961, and had married in August 1905. Their son moved to the US in 1955. Mr Moses Whittle died in July 1965, with the funeral at All Saints church. His mother was born on 23 August 1882. By 1970 Frank Whittle lived in Chagford, in Devon. His mother first flew in an aircraft in August 1970, aged 88, from Birmingham to Guernsey. She had five children, with Frank Whittle the oldest. She had nine grand children and eleven great-grandchildren. She died aged 94 in January 1977. Her daughter was Catherine Frapwell, who lived in Coventry. The jet engine was made public on 7 January 1944.

== Sources ==
Stretton on Dunsmore: The Making of a Warwickshire Village. (2000). Stretton Millennium History Group. ISBN 0-9537462-0-8. 167pp.
