= Tom Lewis (cricketer) =

English cricketer (born 1991)

Personal information
- Full name: Thomas Peter Lewis
- Born: 7 March 1991 (age 35); Coventry, Warwickshire, England
- Batting: Left-handed
- Bowling: Right-arm medium

Domestic team information
- Years: Team
- 2013–2015: Warwickshire (squad no. 7)
- T20 debut: 15 May 2015 Warwickshire v Nottinghamshire

Career statistics
Competition	T20
Matches	8
Runs scored	114
Batting average	14.25
100s/50s	0/0
Top score	27
Catches/stumpings	0/–
- Source: Cricinfo, 5 September 2015

Thomas Peter Lewis (born 7 March 1991) is an English cricketer who plays for Warwickshire. Primarily a left-handed batsman, he also bowls right-arm medium. He made his Twenty20 debut for Warwickshire (known as the Birmingham Bears in Twenty20 cricket) against Nottinghamshire in May 2015. His brother, Mark, played first-class cricket.
