= Madeley Old Manor =

Fortified manor house in Madeley, Staffordshire, England

Coordinates: 52°58′39″N 2°20′22″W

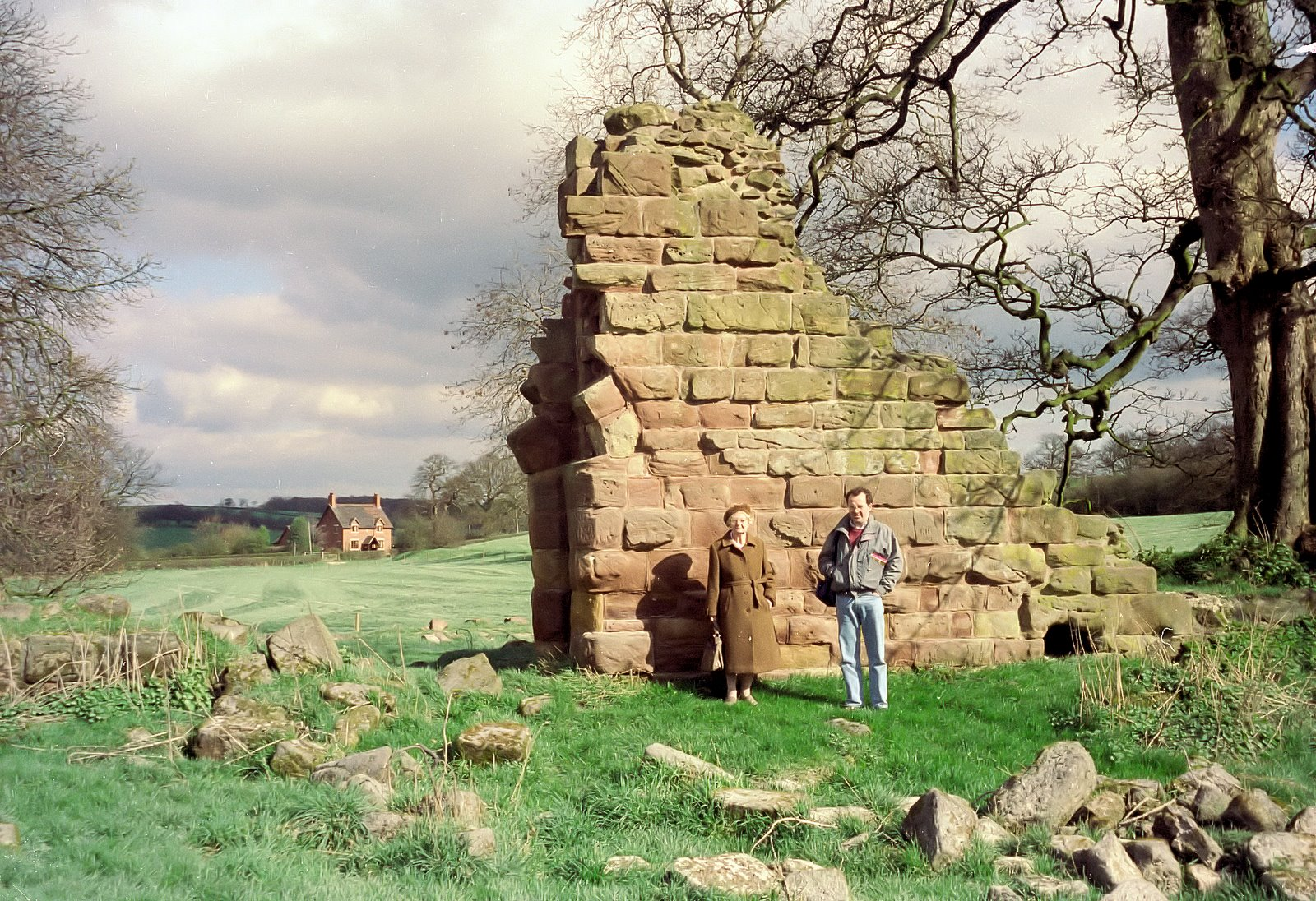
Remains of Madeley Old Manor, for which Ralph de Stafford, 1st Earl of Stafford (1301-1372), received a licence to crenellate in February 1347/8, together with Stafford Castle, "and to make castles of them". Red Sandstone ashlar blocks with external doorway with portcullis groove and chamfered arch at its north end. This fragment is believed to have formed part of the 1st Earl's castle, namely the west external wall and gateway

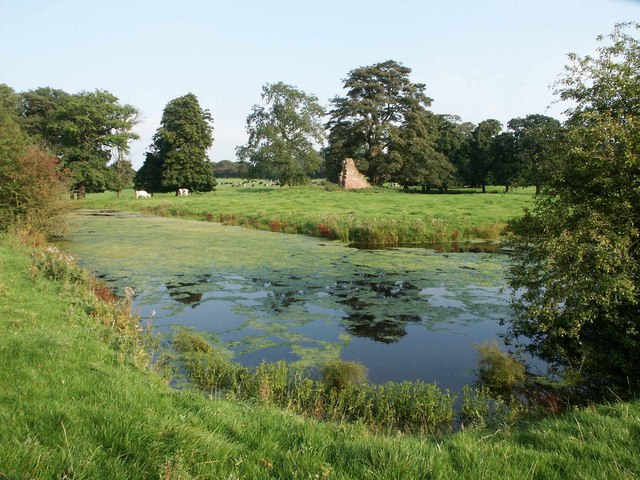
Madeley Old Manor and parkland, with mediaeval fishpond

Madeley Old Manor (in the 14th century Madeley Castle), was a medieval fortified manor house in the parish of Madeley, Staffordshire. It is now a ruin, with only fragments of its walls remaining. The remnants have Grade II listed building status and the site is a scheduled monument. The Tudor manor house is illustrated by Michael Burghers as it appeared in 1686 in Plot's History of Staffordshire, together with the formal gardens and a later east frontage. It is situated a short distance to the south of Heighley Castle, a mediaeval seat of the Audley family.

== Descent ==
=== Stafford ===
Madeley was one of the 131 English manors held by Robert de Stafford (c.1039–c.1100) (alias Robert de Tosny/Toeni, etc.), 1st feudal baron of Stafford, an Anglo-Norman nobleman who arrived in England during or shortly after the Norman Conquest of 1066 and was awarded by King William the Conqueror extensive territories in his newly conquered kingdom, predominantly in the county of Staffordshire. He built Stafford Castle as his seat. His 131 landholdings are listed in the Domesday Book of 1086.

In 1341 his descendant (via a female line) Ralph de Stafford, 1st Earl of Stafford (1301-1372), was granted a charter by King Edward III to hold weekly markets at Madeley on Tuesdays and two annual fairs on St George's day and St Leonard's day. In February 1347/8 the same king granted him royal licence to crenellate "his dwelling places of Stafford (Castle) and Madeley, in Staffs., to make castles of them". Shortly afterwards King Edward did him the great honour of creating him one of the founder Knights of the Garter.

Madeley was forfeited by the Stafford family in 1521 following the execution of Edward Stafford, 3rd Duke of Buckingham (1477–1521), and his posthumous attainder in 1523, when all the estates escheated to the crown. Reginald Whitacres was appointed parker to Madeley Great Park by the king following the execution. The 3rd Duke's descendants managed to regain some of their ancient estates, but the family never recovered its powerful position and the senior male line ended in poverty with the death of Roger Stafford, 6th Baron Stafford (c. 1573–1640).

=== Poyntz ===
Following the death of the 3rd Duke, the manor of Madeley was granted to Sir Francis Poyntz (d.1528), 3rd son of Sir Robert Poyntz (died 1520), lord of the manor of Iron Acton in Gloucestershire, chancellor to Queen Catherine of Aragon (1485-1536), first wife of King Henry VIII. Following his death in 1528 his wife (Jane or Joan Browne, daughter of Sir Matthew Browne of Betchworth, Surrey), continued the lease, and was succeeded by his nephew.

=== Offley ===
In 1547 it was sold by Sir Edward Braye and Joan Browne his wife, daughter and heiress of Sir Matthew Browne, (apparently the widow of Sir Francis Poyntz) to Thomas Offley (d. 1582), a member of the Worshipful Company of Merchant Taylors, who became Lord Mayor of London in 1556. His wife was Joan Nichols. Five generations of Offleys lived at the manor including three John Offleys who served as High Sheriff of Staffordshire. Sir Thomas Offley's son, Henry Offley, married Mary White, a daughter of Sir John White of Aldershot, Lord Mayor of London (1563-64). Henry Offley's son and heir was Sir John Offley, who married Anne Fuller, a daughter of Nicholas Fuller M.P., and several of their children married into notable families: William Offley married Frances, a daughter of John Lane of Bentley, MP; Elizabeth Offley married Sir Robert Jenney, son of Sir Arthur Jenney of Knodishall, Suffolk; and Katherine Offley married firstly Thomas Willis, son of Thomas Willis, Clerk of the Crown in Chancery, and secondly his cousin William Willis.

=== Crewe ===
Thomas Offley's great-great-grandson John Offley (b. 1649) married Anne Crewe, heiress of Crewe Hall, Cheshire. Their son, John Offley, changed his name by a private act of Parliament, Offley's Name Act 1708 (7 Ann. c. 3 Pr.), to John Offley Crewe when he inherited his mother's estate. Their grandson was John Crewe, 1st Baron Crewe (1742–1829).

Madeley Manor was abandoned and fell into ruin following the building of the second Madeley Manor (O.S. map reference SJ 7759 4591). The family eventually made Crewe Hall their principal seat.

== See also ==
- Listed buildings in Madeley, Staffordshire
