= Paul Goodwin (cricketer) =

English cricketer (born 1978)

Personal information
- Full name: Paul Samuel James Goodwin
- Born: 12 May 1978 (age 48); Madeley Heath, Staffordshire, England
- Batting: Right-handed
- Role: Wicket-keeper

Domestic team information
- Years: Team
- 1999–present: Staffordshire

Career statistics
Competition	List A
Matches	2
Runs scored	34
Batting average	17.00
100s/50s	–/–
Top score	31
Balls bowled	–
Wickets	–
Bowling average	–
5 wickets in innings	–
10 wickets in match	–
Best bowling	–
Catches/stumpings	4/2
- Source: Cricinfo, 13 June 2011

Paul Samuel James Goodwin (born 12 May 1978) is an English cricketer. Goodwin is a right-handed batsman who plays as a wicket-keeper. He was born in Madeley Heath, Staffordshire.

Goodwin made his debut for Staffordshire in the 1999 Minor Counties Championship against Buckinghamshire. Goodwin has played Minor counties cricket for Staffordshire from 1999 to present, which has included 52 Minor Counties Championship matches and 30 MCCA Knockout Trophy matches. In 2004, he made his List A debut against Lancashire in the Cheltenham & Gloucester Trophy. He played a further List A match against Surrey in the 2005 Cheltenham & Gloucester Trophy. In his 2 List A matches, he scored 34 runs at a batting average of 17.00 with a high score of 31. Behind the stumps he took 4 catches and made 2 stumpings.
