= All Saints' Church, Madeley =

Church of All Saints
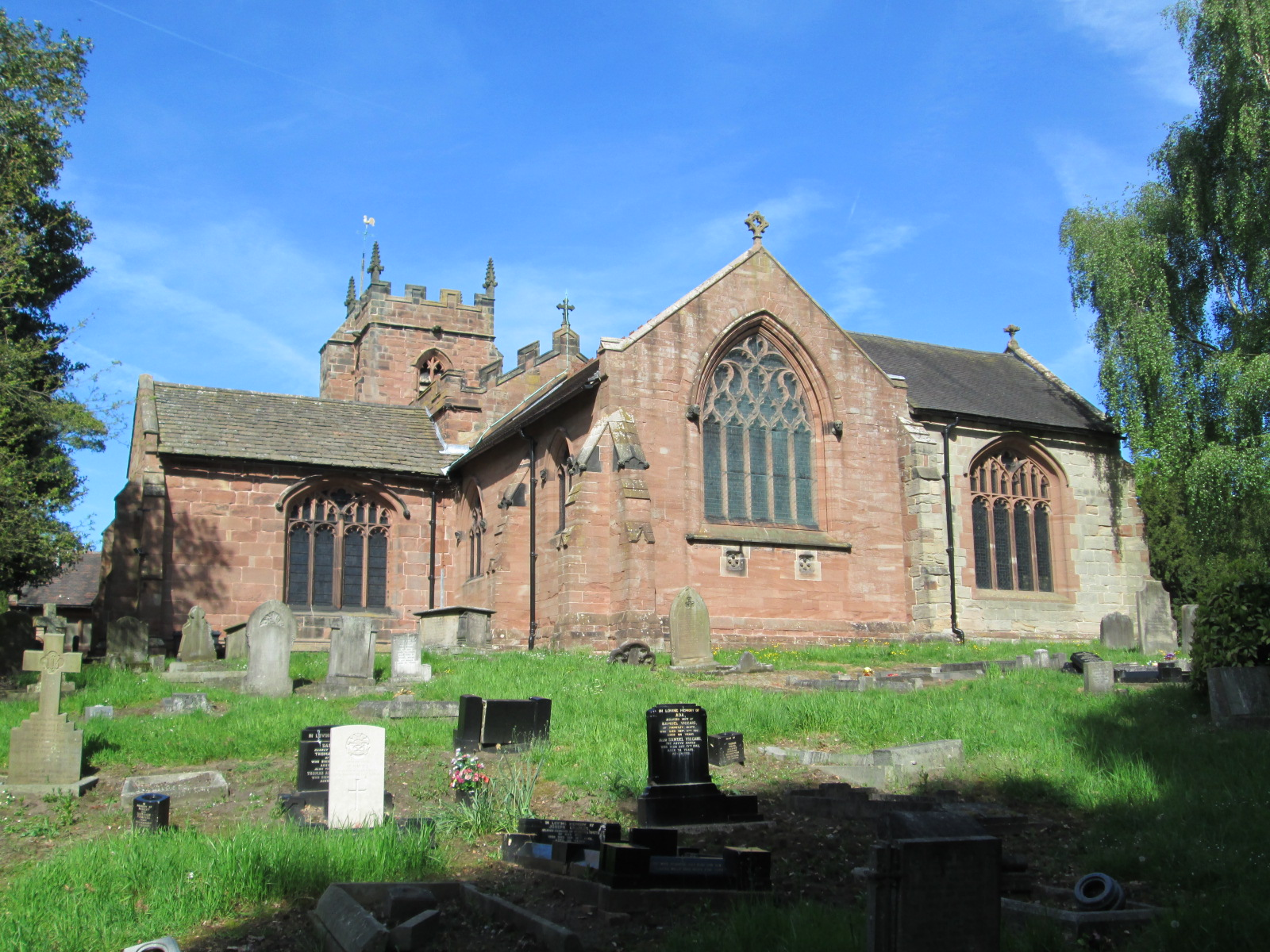
- Viewed from the east
- Church of All Saints
- 52°59′46.32″N 2°20′22.7″W
- OS grid reference: SJ 773 444
- Location: Madeley, Staffordshire
- Country: England
- Denomination: Church of England

Architecture
- Heritage designation: Grade I
- Designated: 17 November 1966

Administration
- Diocese: Diocese of Lichfield

All Saints' Church is an Anglican church in Madeley, Staffordshire, England, and in the Diocese of Lichfield. The building dates mostly from the 14th and 15th centuries, and the chancel was rebuilt in the 19th century. It is Grade I listed.

== Description ==
A church on the site is first recorded in the late 10th century. The earliest surviving part of the church, the arcade on the north side of the nave, dates from the late 12th century. The wide, pointed chancel arch is early 13th century, and the north aisle is of the 14th century. There are north and south transepts (unusual in a small parish church) dating from the 15th century; also of the 15th century are the north chancel chapel (now a vestry), the clerestory, and the tower.

=== Monuments ===
There is in the north transept an alabaster tomb chest for Randolph Egerton (died 1512) and his wife; in the south transept, a memorial to John Offley (died 1688); in the floor, a brass to John Egerton (died 1518) and his wife; and on the east wall, tablets to Sir Holland Egerton of the Egerton family (died 1730) and his wife.

=== Restoration ===
In restoration of 1872 largely funded by Lord Crewe, the chancel, originally of the 13th century, was rebuilt by Charles Lynam. It has a panelled, painted ceiling, and the east window is by Clayton and Bell. The window in the west end of the south aisle is by Morris & Co. and has figures by William Morris, Ford Madox Brown and Edward Burne-Jones.

During 2007 to 2009, a new reredos was installed, replacing the 1872 reredos that was later lost; new lighting was installed; and hidden tile work of 1872 in the chancel was revealed.

== Vicars ==
John William Daltry (1804–1879) became vicar in 1833 and served until 1879. His son, Thomas William Daltry (1833–1904; also a noted entomologist) was assistant curate from 1861 to 1880, then vicar until 1904.

== See also ==
- Listed buildings in Madeley, Staffordshire
