= Onneley =

Hamlet in Staffordshire, England

Coordinates: 52.984°N 2.3728°W

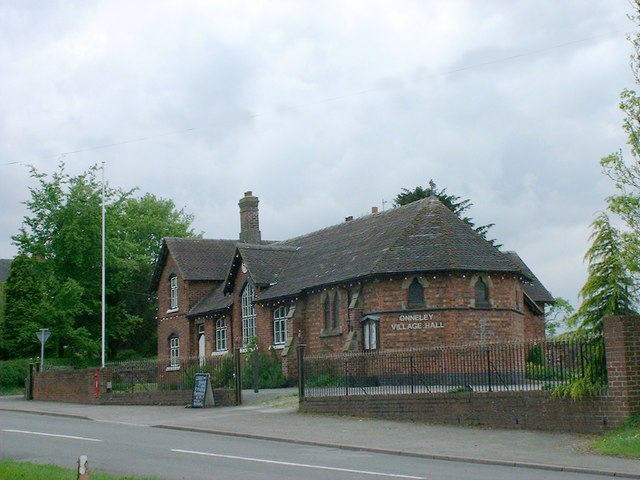
- Onneley Village Hall

- Location within Staffordshire
- OS grid reference: SJ750430
- District: Newcastle-under-Lyme
- Shire county: Staffordshire
- Region: West Midlands
- Country: England
- Sovereign state: United Kingdom
- Post town: Crewe
- Postcode district: CW3
- Dialling code: 01782
- Police: Staffordshire
- Fire: Staffordshire
- Ambulance: West Midlands
- UK Parliament: Newcastle-under-Lyme

Onneley is a hamlet in the Borough of Newcastle-under-Lyme, Staffordshire.

Situated within Onneley is the local Golf and Cricket club.

Onneley Cricket club play at the Onneley Oval.

== See also ==
- Listed buildings in Madeley, Staffordshire
