= A531 road =

Road in England

A531

Route information
- Length: 7 mi (11 km)

Major junctions
- South end: Madeley Heath, Staffordshire
- North end: A500, nr Weston Cheshire

Location
- Country: United Kingdom

Road network
- Roads in the United Kingdom; Motorways; A and B road zones

The A531 is non-primary route in England that runs from Madeley Heath in Staffordshire to join the A500 close to Weston near Crewe, Cheshire.
