= Hatherton, Cheshire =

Hamlet and civil parish, Cheshire, England

Coordinates: 53.022°N 2.468°W

Hatherton
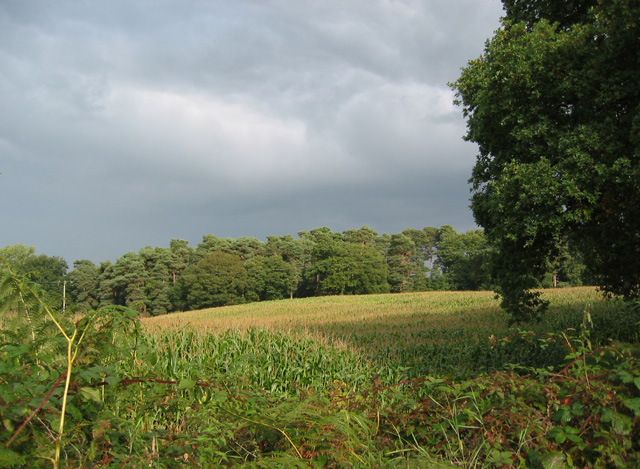
- Birchenhill Wood, Hatherton

- Location within Cheshire
- Population: 360 (2011)
- OS grid reference: SJ687474
- Civil parish: Hatherton
- Unitary authority: Cheshire East
- Ceremonial county: Cheshire
- Region: North West
- Country: England
- Sovereign state: United Kingdom
- Post town: NANTWICH
- Postcode district: CW5
- Dialling code: 01270
- Police: Cheshire
- Fire: Cheshire
- Ambulance: North West
- UK Parliament: Crewe and Nantwich

Hatherton is a hamlet and civil parish in the unitary authority of Cheshire East and the ceremonial county of Cheshire, England. The hamlet is on the B5071 at SJ687474, 2 3/4 miles (4.4 km) to the north east of Audlem and 3 3/4 miles (6.0 km) to the south east of Nantwich. The civil parish has an area of 673 hectares (1,660 acres) and also includes the small settlements of Birchall Moss, Broomlands and part of Artlebrook, with a total population of 360 in 2011. Nearby villages include Hankelow, Stapeley, Walgherton, Wybunbury, Blakenhall and Buerton. The A529 runs through the parish and the River Weaver forms the western boundary.

Hatherton was first recorded in the Domesday survey as Haretone. The 18th-century Hatherton Manor farmhouse is listed at grade II*, and there are also grade-II-listed timber-framed and brick farmhouses and former country houses. The hamlet has a Methodist chapel. The Hatherton Flush Site of Special Scientific Interest is a wetland by the Weaver that supports marsh helleborine, marsh lousewort and tubular water-dropwort, which are rare in Cheshire.

== History ==
Haretone was a small manor at the time of the Domesday survey of 1086, and was held by William Malbank, Baron of Wich Malbank (Nantwich), with an annual value of 10 shillings. Before the Norman Conquest, it had been held by Ulfkil, when it had been valued at £2. Five households were recorded, interpreted as a manor house, lodge and two farms, as well as five ploughlands and a small wood. The old Hatherton Hall was replaced by a farmhouse. During the Civil War, Sir Thomas Smythe of Hatherton was a Parliamentarian who was among the Cheshire gentry who signed the "Cheshire Remonstrance" of 1642.

The parish had two Methodist chapels. The earliest dates from 1864, and is a Primitive Methodist chapel on Crewe Road (now the B5071). A Wesleyan Methodist chapel was constructed on Audlem Road (now the A529) in 1900; it closed in 1968. During the First World War, eighty German prisoners-of-war were interned in Hatherton and employed as agricultural labourers, and the stables of The Broomlands near Birchall Moss served as an equine hospital. The stables were later converted into dwellings and a village store and post office, which has since closed.

In 1881, more than two-thirds of the men in the parish were engaged in agriculture. Hatherton was within the Delves-Broughton estate until it was broken up in around 1920. In the 1960s, the Co-operative Wholesale Society bought many local farms and ran them as Co-op farms. The 1967–68 outbreak of foot-and-mouth disease caused major problems for dairy farms in the Wybunbury area, including Joseph Heler's in Hatherton. The parish remained largely rural in 1990, with only minimal development noted since the 1960s.

== Governance ==
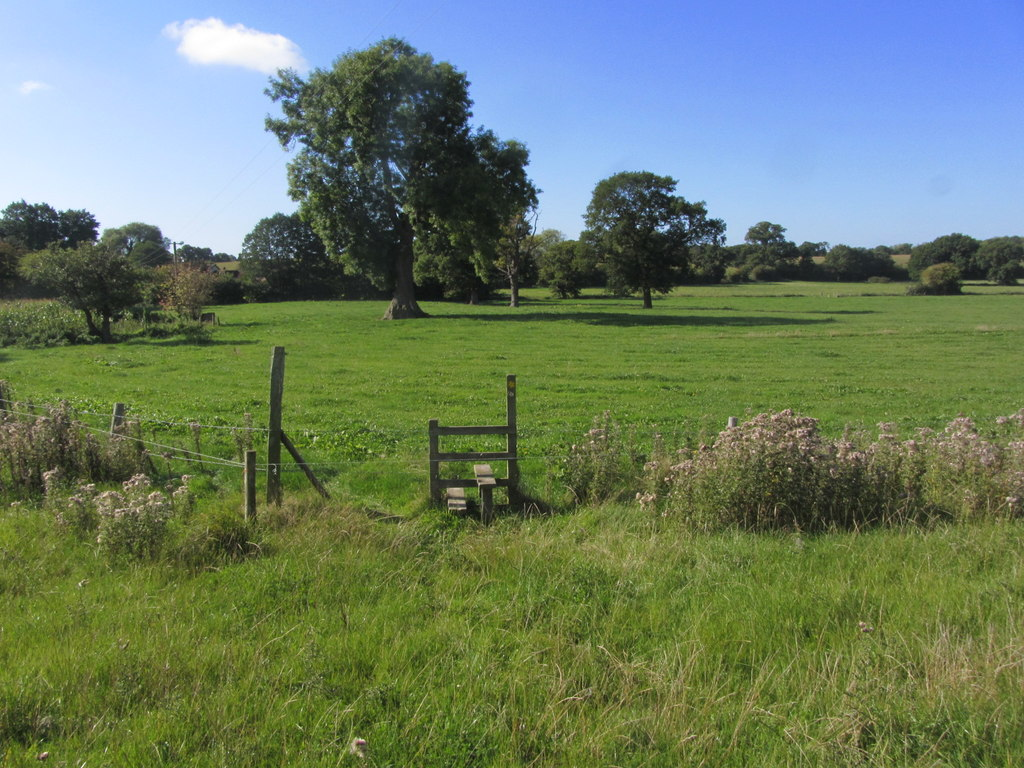
Pasture on the South Cheshire Way in the south east of the parish

Hatherton is administered jointly with the adjacent parish of Walgherton by Hatherton and Walgherton Parish Council. From 1974 the civil parish was served by Crewe and Nantwich Borough Council, which was succeeded on 1 April 2009 by the unitary authority of Cheshire East. Hatherton falls in the parliamentary constituency of Crewe and Nantwich, which has been represented by Kieran Mullan since 2019, after being represented by Laura Smith (2017–19), Edward Timpson (2008–17) and Gwyneth Dunwoody (1983–2008).

== Geography, ecology and transport ==
The civil parish has an area of 673 hectares (1,660 acres). The A529 runs north–south through the parish and the B5071 (Crewe Road) runs to the north-east from the A529 junction at Oakes Corner towards Walgherton. Park Lane connects the A529 and the B5071, and Hunsterson Road runs eastwards from this junction on the B5071 to the hamlet of Hunsterson in the adjacent parish. Lodge Lane runs south-east from the B5071 to Hunsterson Road. Bridgemere Lane runs eastwards from the A529 to Hunsterson, and Birchall Moss Lane cuts from the A529 to Bridgemere Lane. The hamlet of Hatherton is centred at the crossroads of Park Lane/Hunsterson Road with the B5071, extending along both unclassified roads. The South Cheshire Way long-distance footpath runs through the south of the parish, partly following Bridgemere Lane and the A529.

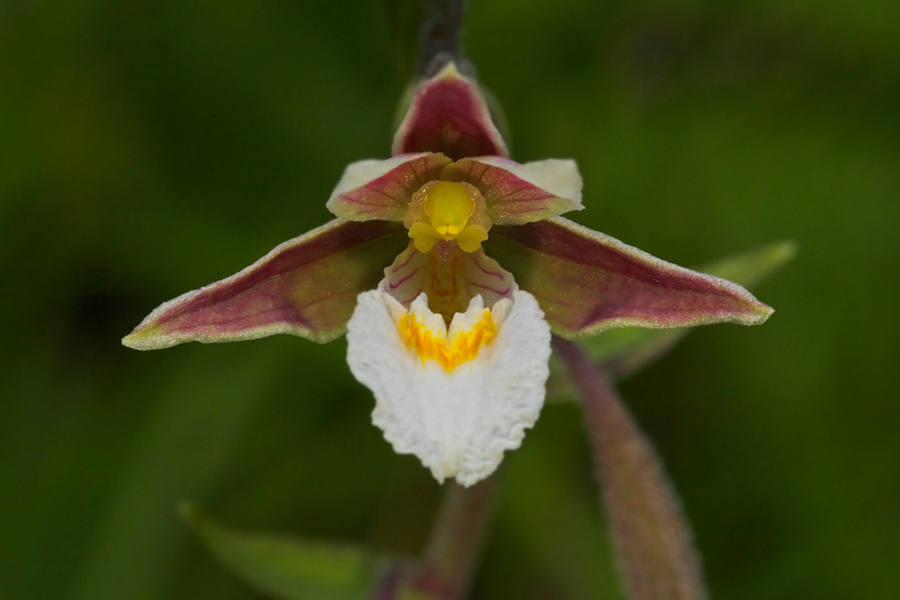
Marsh helleborine, an orchid found at Hatherton Flush that is rare in Cheshire

The River Weaver runs north–south forming the western boundary of the parish, Artle Brook runs on or near the northern boundary, and Birchall Brook forms part of the south-western boundary. The terrain is undulating, sloping more steeply down to the Weaver in the west, with a lowest elevation of around 38 metres (125 ft) along the Weaver. The highest area is in the south of the parish, around Birchall Moss and south of Bridgemere Lane, at around 72 metres (236 ft). The entire civil parish is classified by Cheshire Wildlife Trust as "Lower Farms and Woods", and the area in the south of the parish around Birchall Moss has been identified as a key area for wildlife. There are numerous small meres or ponds, as well as small areas of deciduous and mixed woodland, including Birchall Moss, Birchenhill Wood, Acton's Rough, Lane Wood, Gorse Wood, Chestnut Wood and Blackthorn Wood. Chestnut and Blackthorn Woods, which line Birchall Brook on the boundary with Hankelow, are marked on tithe maps and might represent small patches of ancient woodland.

Hatherton Flush is a Site of Special Scientific Interest on the bank of the Weaver south of Acton's Rough (at SJ672483), designated for its variety of wetland plants. It is the largest example of its kind of flush in the county. The flush is set in partly unimproved acidic grassland. The site supports abundant orchids, including the locally rare species marsh helleborine, as well as seven species of sedge; other locally rare species include marsh lousewort and tubular water-dropwort, and the locally scarce species bog pimpernel, marsh valerian and spiny restharrow are also found at the site.

== Demography ==
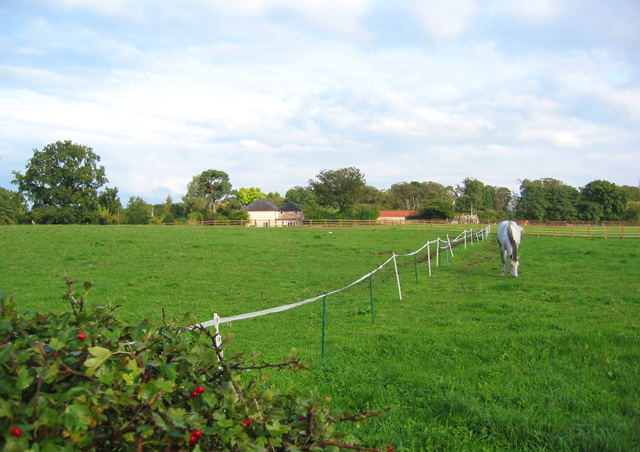
Horse paddocks by the B5071

According to the 2001 census, Hatherton civil parish had a population of 344, increasing to 360 in 143 households at the 2011 census. This represents a small decline from the mid-19th-century peak, but an increase compared with the mid-20th-century population; historical population figures are 191 (1801), 394 (1851), 367 (1871), 290 (1901) and 321 (1951).

== Landmarks ==
There is a small mid-19th-century Methodist chapel on Crewe Road; as of 2020, it forms part of the Methodist ministry of nearby Hankelow.

There are several listed buildings within the parish, one of which is designated as grade II*, the middle of the three grades, denoting "particularly important buildings of more than special interest": Hatherton Manor, off Audlem Road (A529), is a farmhouse of five bays in orange-red brick with stone dressings, dating from 1703. There are two storeys, plus a basement and attics, under a tiled roof, and the main entrance is approached by a flight of stone steps. Of the buildings listed at grade II, the oldest is Yew Tree Farmhouse on Audlem Road, a 16th-century, timber-framed house with a tiled roof, featuring small framing infilled with brick. Birchall Moss Hall, also on Audlem Road, is a timber-framed, rendered former farmhouse with small framing and a tiled roof, dating originally from the late 16th or 17th century.

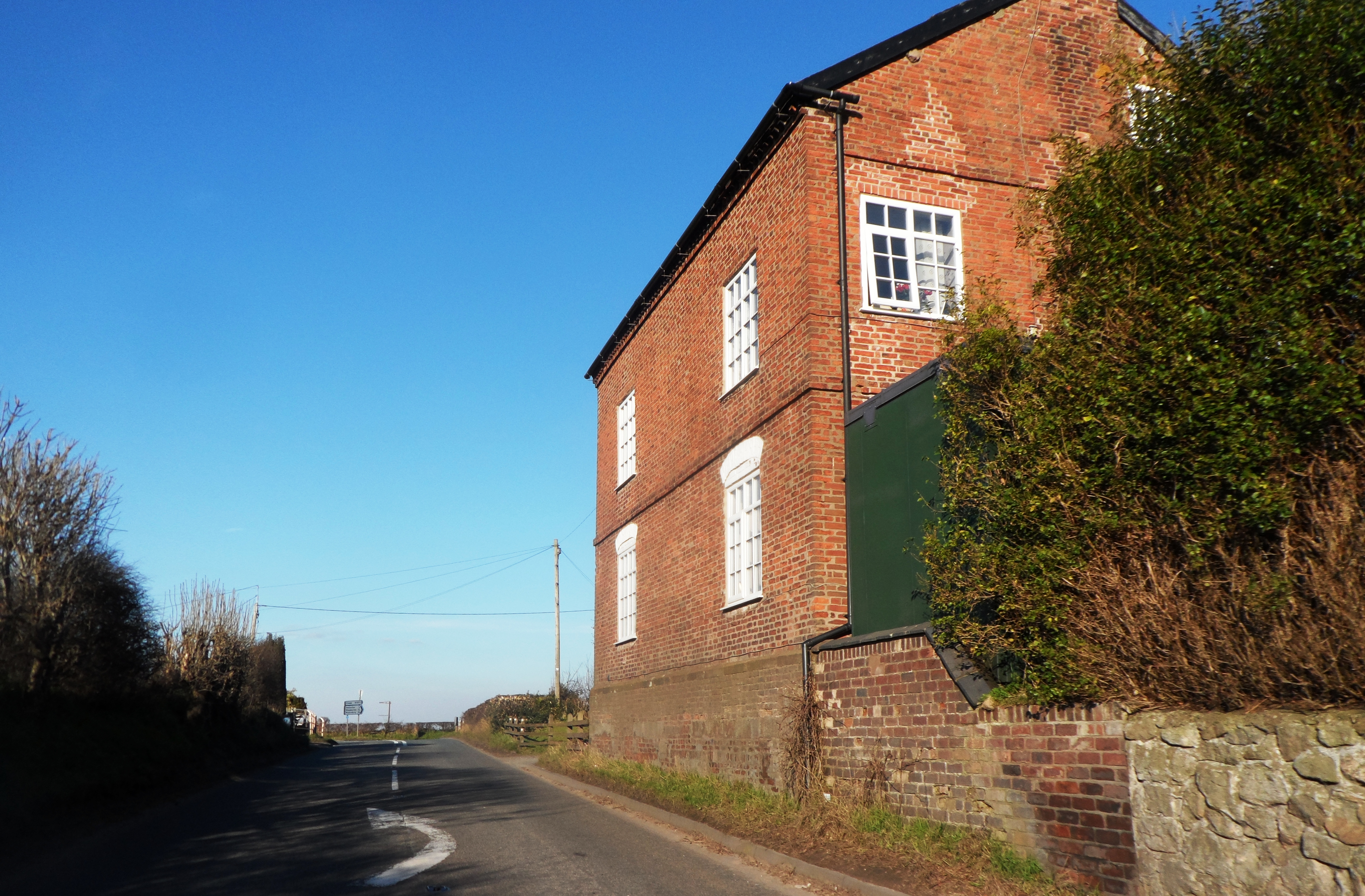
Bank House, Audlem Road (A529)

Several brick houses built between the 17th and mid-19th centuries are also listed at grade II. Part of Park House on Park Lane dates from the 17th century and is in brick described by Historic England as "plum coloured". The three-bay main façade dates from the early 19th century and uses orange-red brick with stone dressings; it features a Tuscan porch. Bank House, on Audlem Road by Oakes Corner, dates originally from the late 17th or early 18th century, and is in plum-coloured brick with stone dressings under a tiled roof. Hatherton House on Broad Lane dates originally from the late 18th or early 19th century. Its three-storey, three-bay main façade is in red brick with stone dressings, with decorative yellow-brick quoins. The arched ashlar doorway features pilasters and carved wreaths; above it is a first-floor window whose stone surround is topped with a pediment. The early 19th-century Hatherton Lodge stands on Lodge Lane, on the site of an earlier lodge, and is described by Historic England as an example of the Picturesque Movement. The L-shaped villa has a stucco-rendered front façade of three bays with stucco quoins. The central limestone portico with Tuscan columns has a bow window above it. The Broomlands on Birchall Moss Lane is a large mid-19th-century former country house, now divided into three, which has a rendered finish and a slate roof. The entrance front has a colonnade porch with stone Doric columns, and the five-bay garden façade features two small bows. A disused 19th-century road bridge over Birchall Brook, on the boundary with Hankelow, is also listed; it is in red brick with stone dressings.

== Education ==
There are no educational facilities in Hatherton. The civil parish falls within the catchment areas of Brine Leas School in Nantwich, and Stapeley Broad Lane Church of England Primary School.

== See also ==
- List of Sites of Special Scientific Interest in Cheshire
- Listed buildings in Hatherton, Cheshire
