= Hatherton Flush =

Protected area in Cheshire, England

- Site of Special Scientific Interest
- Location within Cheshire
- Location of Hatherton Flush.
- Area of search: Cheshire
- Grid reference: SJ672483
- Coordinates: 53°01′51″N 02°29′27″W
- Interest: Biological
- Area: 1.935 hectares (4.78 acres)
- Notification date: 18 October 1985

Hatherton Flush is a Site of Special Scientific Interest (SSSI) by the River Weaver in Hatherton, near Wybunbury, Cheshire, England. It is protected for its variety of wetland plants. Species found at the site include the locally rare plants marsh helleborine, marsh lousewort and tubular water dropwort. Hatherton Flush is the largest example of this kind of flush in the county. The site was assessed as being in an "unfavourable"/"recovering" condition in 2008.

== Description ==
Hatherton Flush SSSI is located at SJ672483, on the east bank of the River Weaver. It is on private land, immediately southeast of a public footpath from the A529 at Chapel Farm that crosses the Weaver via a footbridge. Mineral-bearing groundwater from local aquifers gradually drips down the steep riverbank, forming a flush, a type of wetland which is similar to a spring-fed fen, but with a slower water flow. The type of vegetation depends on the underlying geology, here glacial deposits.

The SSSI covers an area of 1.935 hectares (4.78 acres). The flush is designated for the variety of wetland plants it supports, described by Natural England as an "excellent assemblage," and much of the site supports a wide range of plants. These include several species of orchid, which grow in abundance at the site, particularly common spotted orchid (Dactylorhiza fuchsii) and southern marsh orchid (Dactylorhiza praetermissa), and also the locally rare species, marsh helleborine (Epipactis palustris). Seven species of sedge (Carex) are found in this area of the SSSI, as well as the locally rare species marsh lousewort (Pedicularis palustris) and tubular water dropwort (Oenanthe fistulosa), and the locally scarce species bog pimpernel (Lysimachia tenella, syn. Anagallis tenella) and marsh valerian (Valeriana dioica). Other plants include marsh pennywort (Hydrocotyle vulgaris), marsh arrowgrass (Triglochin palustris) and great horsetail (Equisetum telmateia).

The southern part of the flush is less diverse, supporting predominantly a mix of rushes (Juncus) and fleabane (Pulicaria dysenterica).

The flush is situated within an area of acidic grassland, part of which has not been improved, and is limited to a few plant species. Typical grass species are crested dog's-tail (Cynosurus cristatus) and heathgrass (Danthonia decumbens), while broad-leaved flowering plants include bird's-foot trefoil (Lotus corniculatus), devil's-bit scabious (Succisa pratensis) and sheep's sorrel (Rumex acetosella). The locally scarce spiny restharrow (Ononis spinosa) also grows on the site.

=== Photographs ===
Some of the species found at the SSSI (not photographed there); flush species:

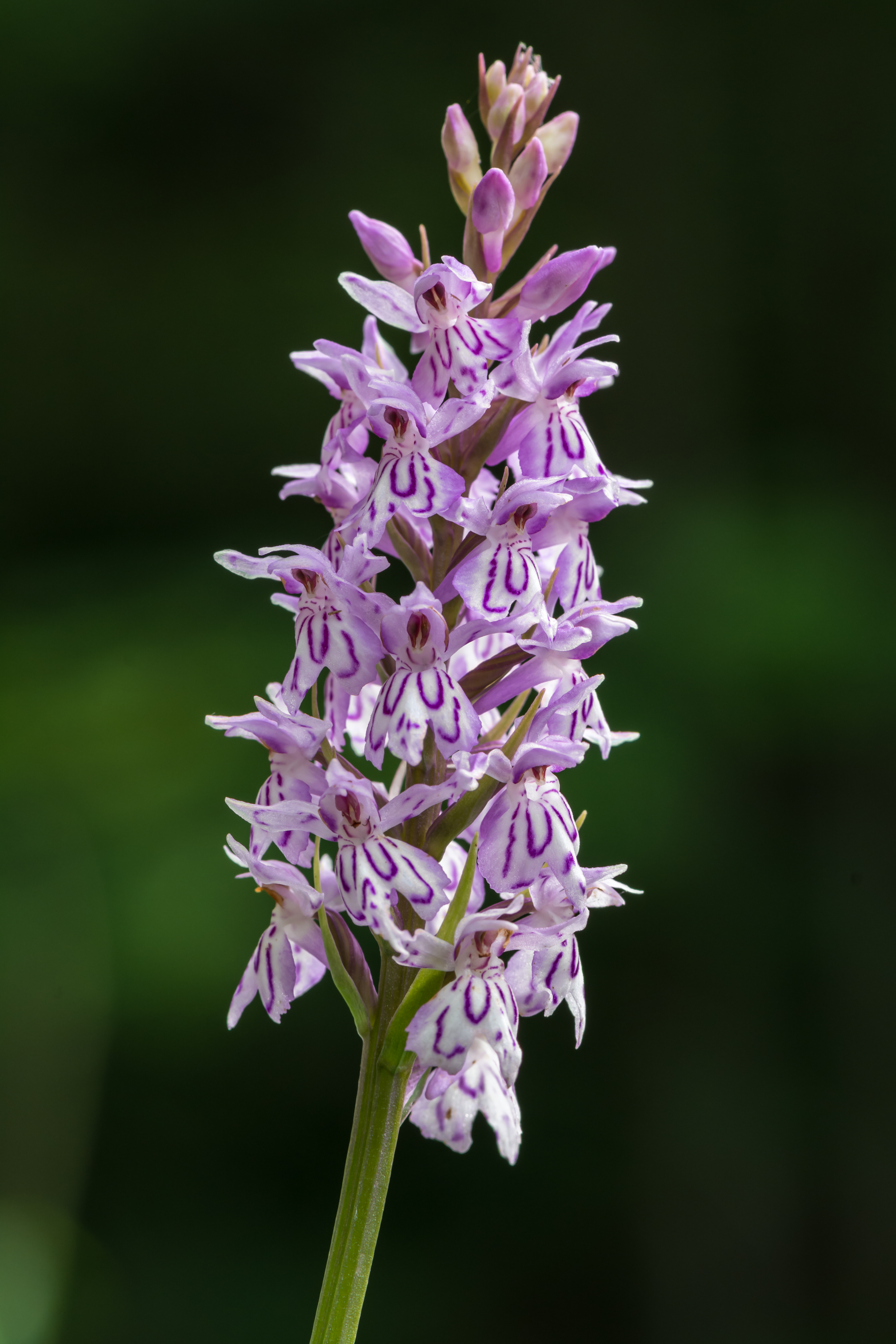
Common spotted orchid

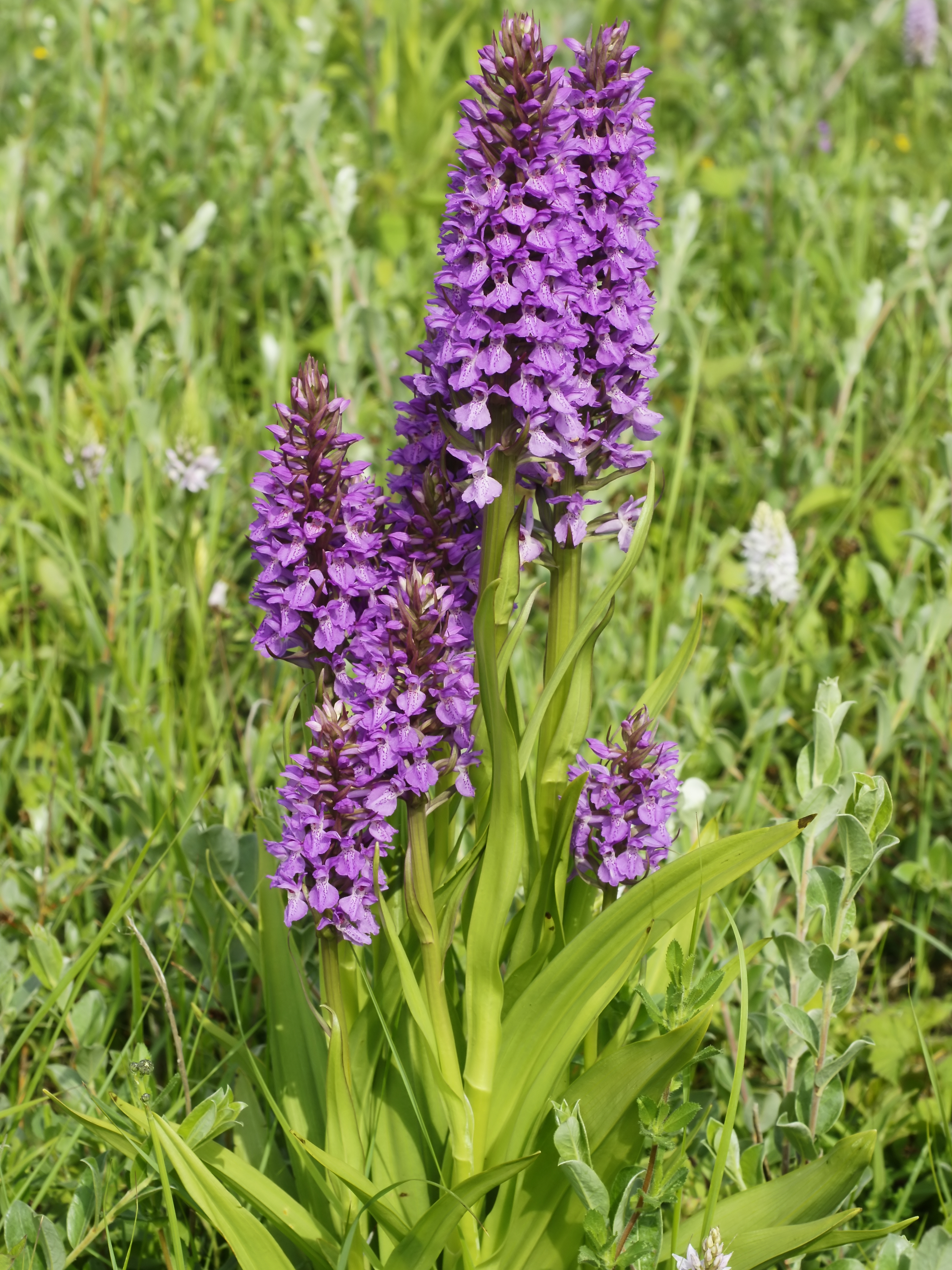
Southern marsh orchid

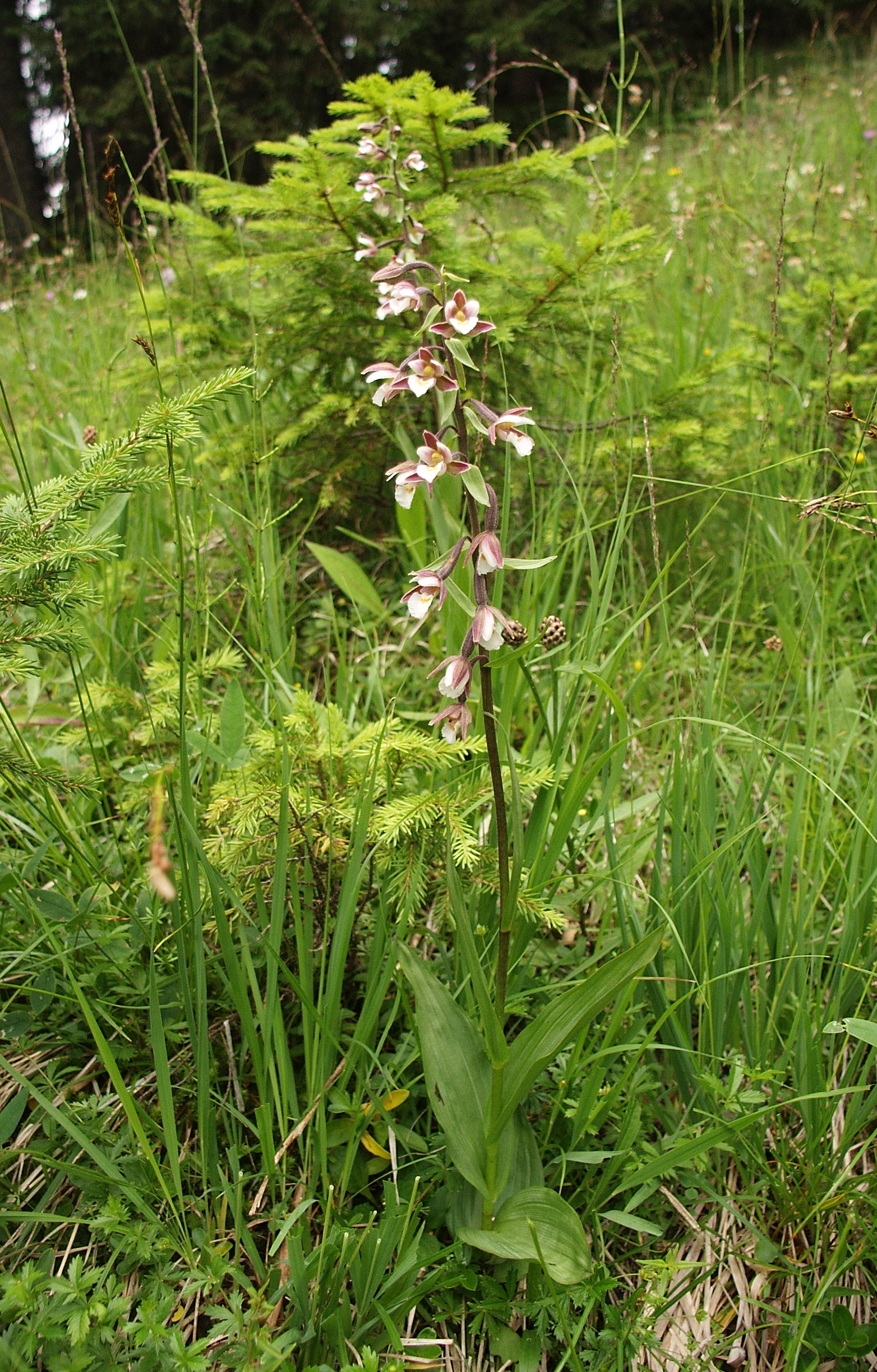
Marsh helleborine

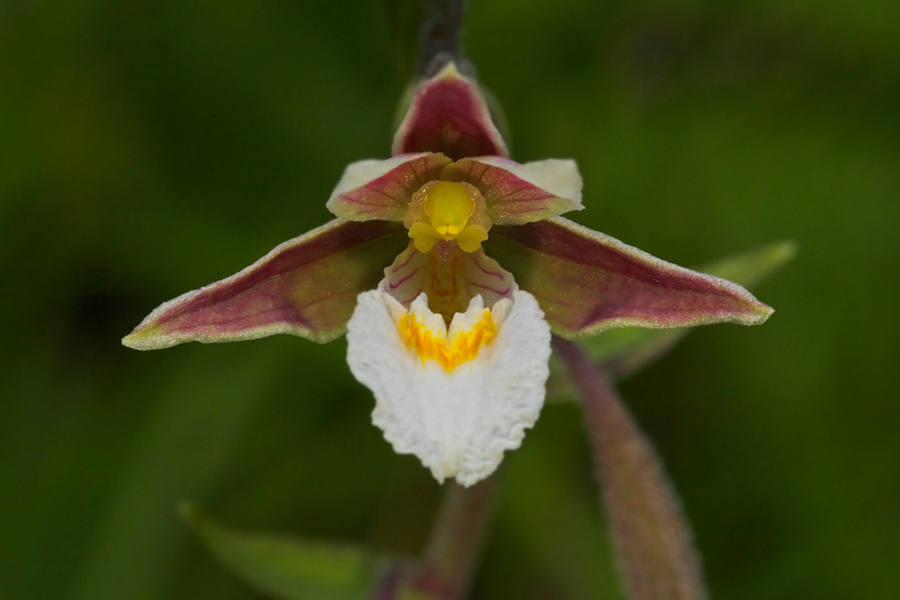
Marsh helleborine flower

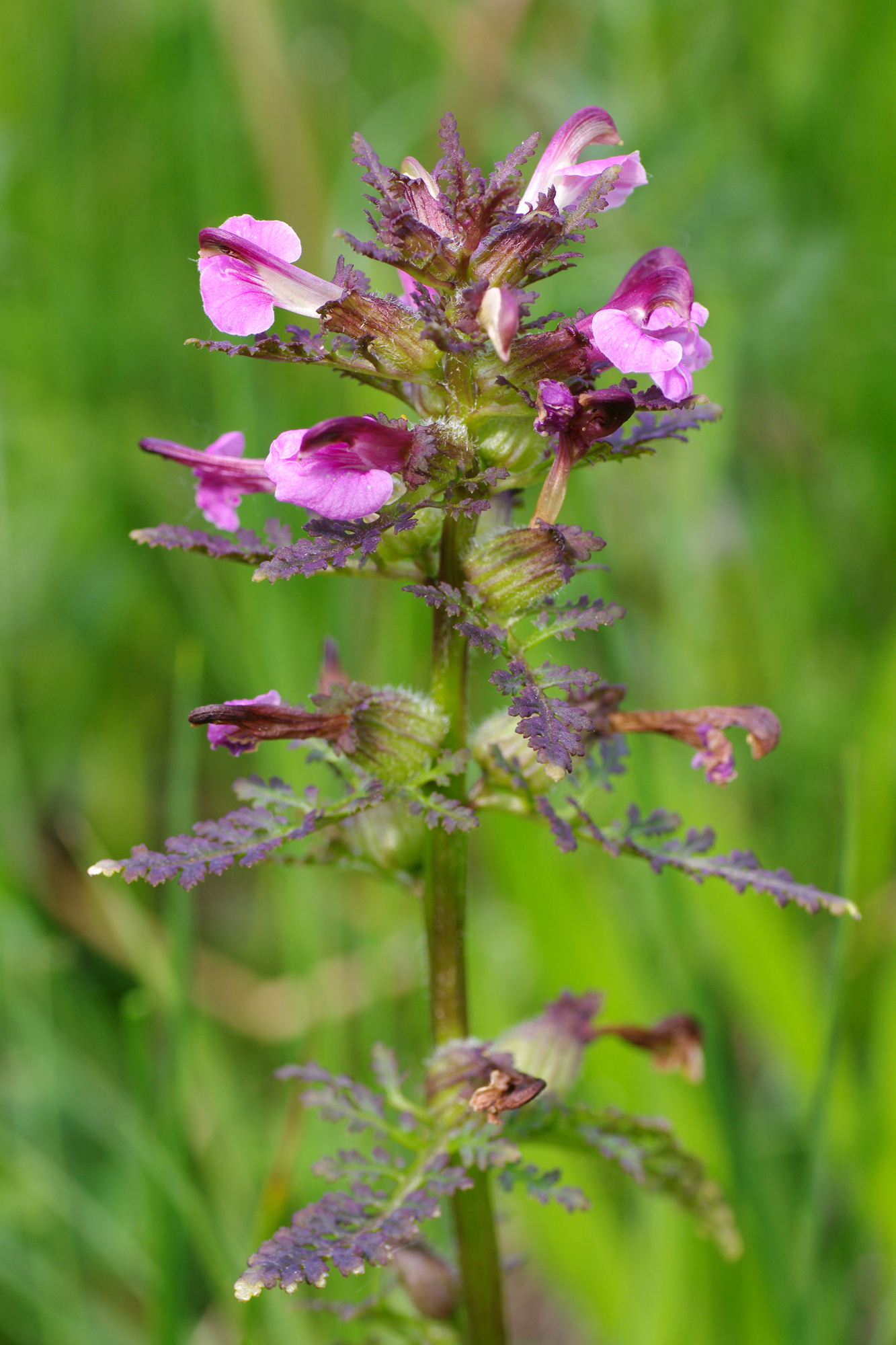
Marsh lousewort

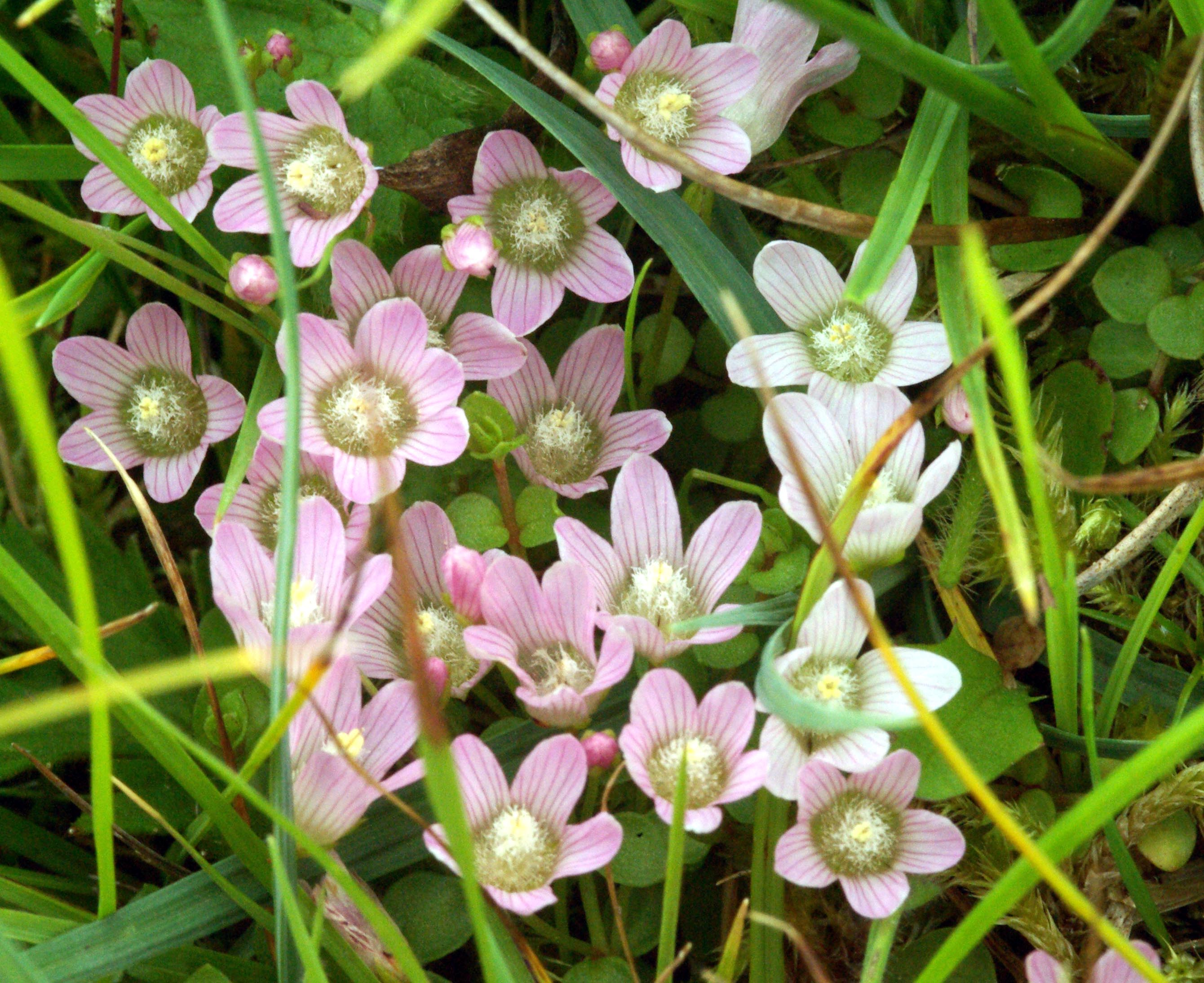
Bog pimpernel

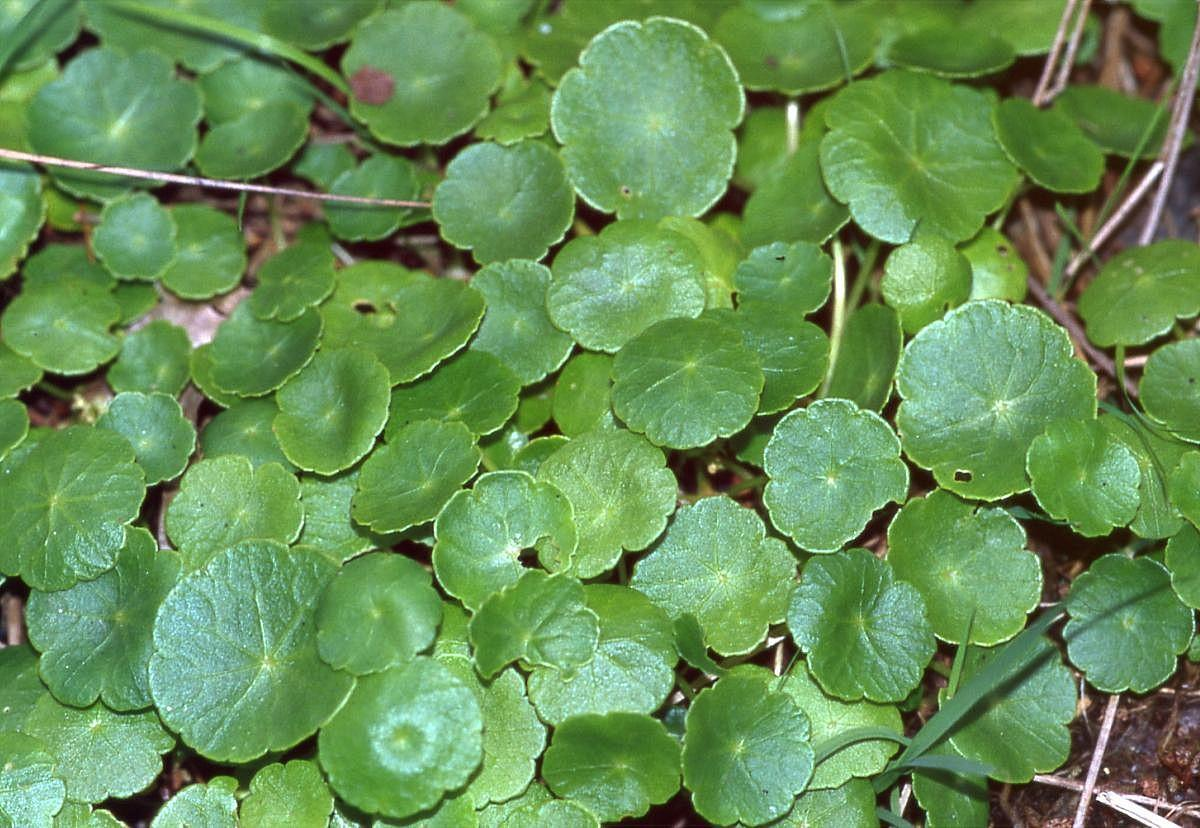
Marsh pennywort

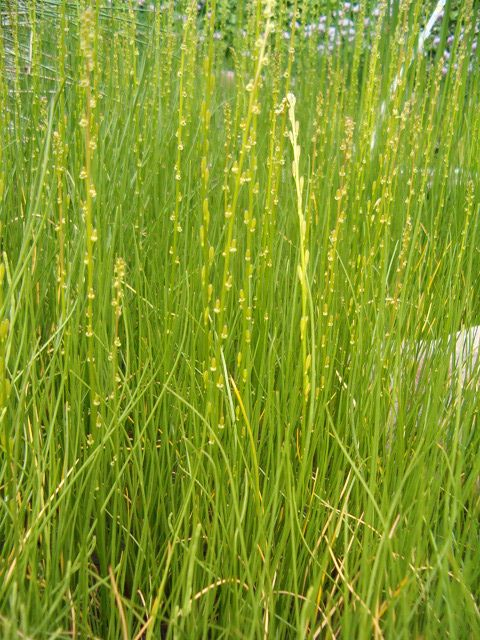
Marsh arrowgrass

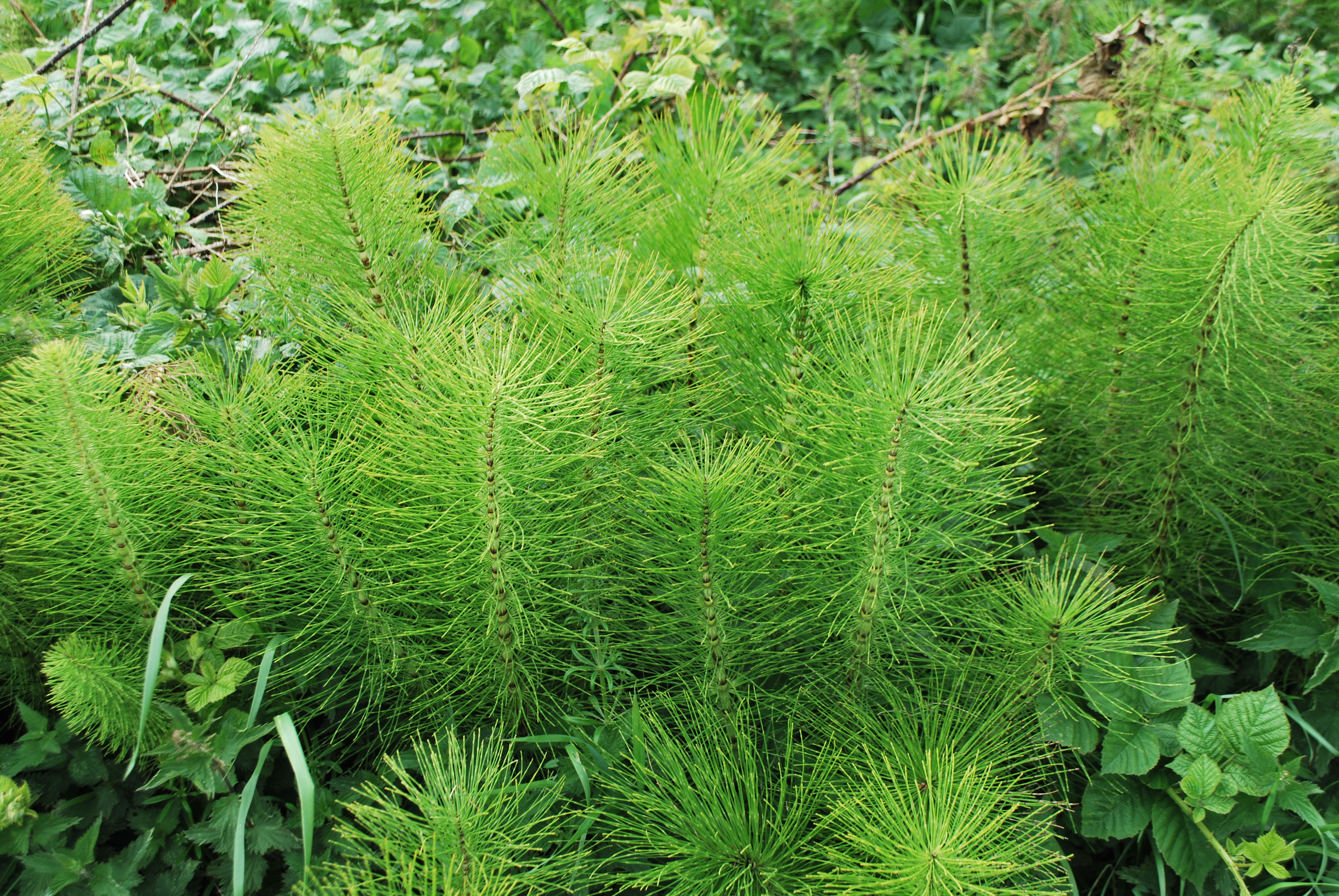
Great horsetail

Grassland species:

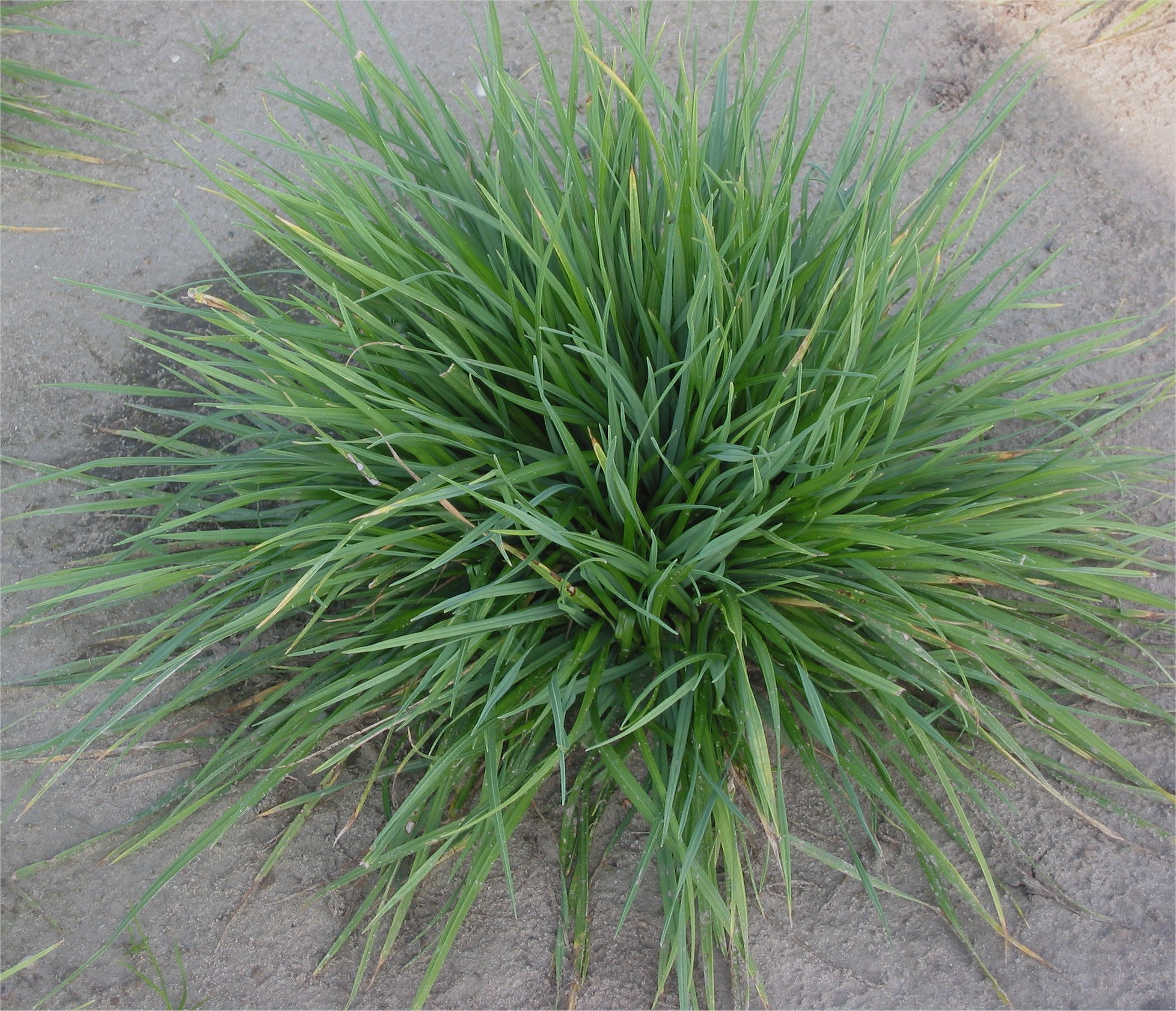
Crested dog's-tail

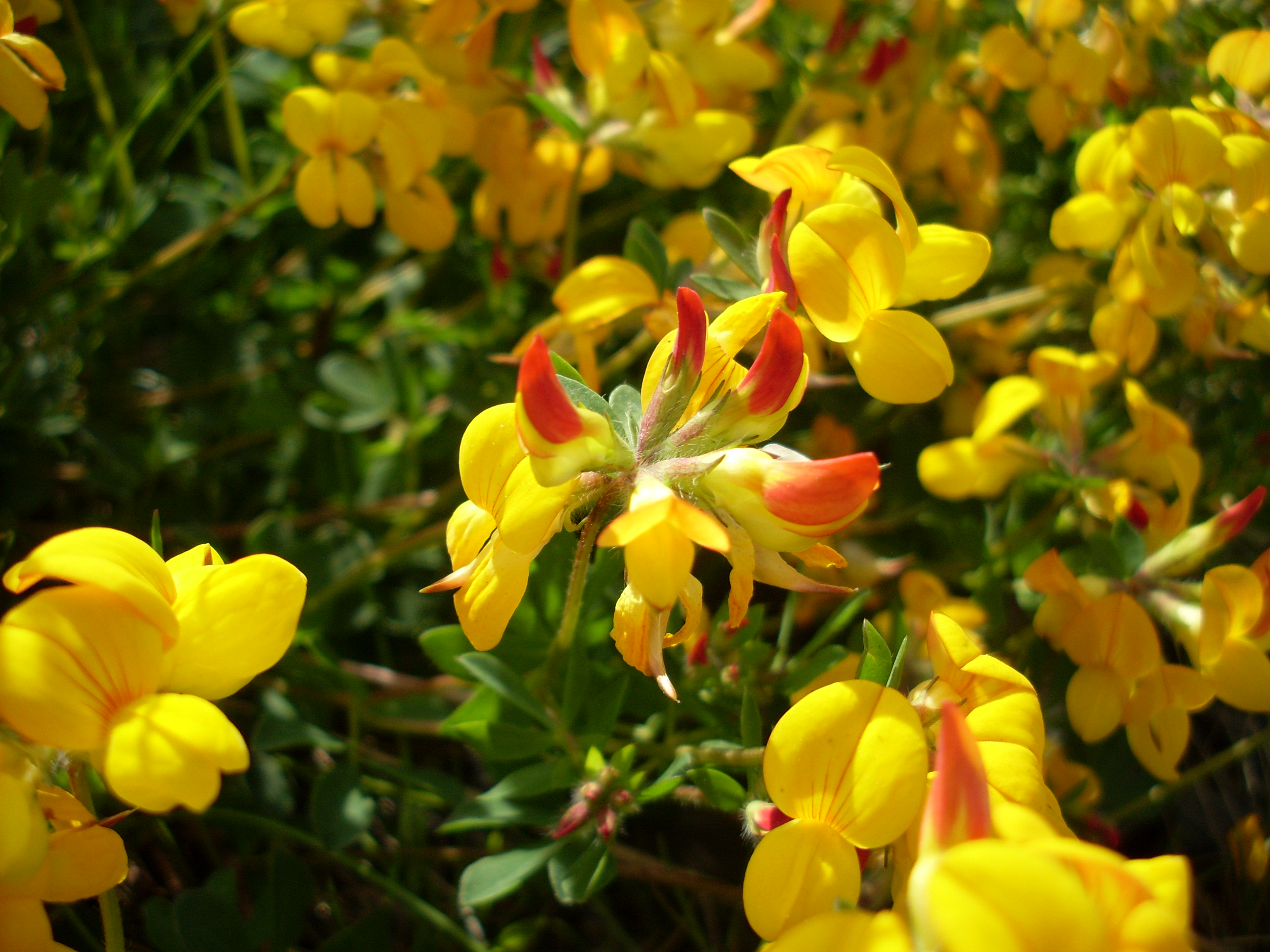
Bird's-foot trefoil

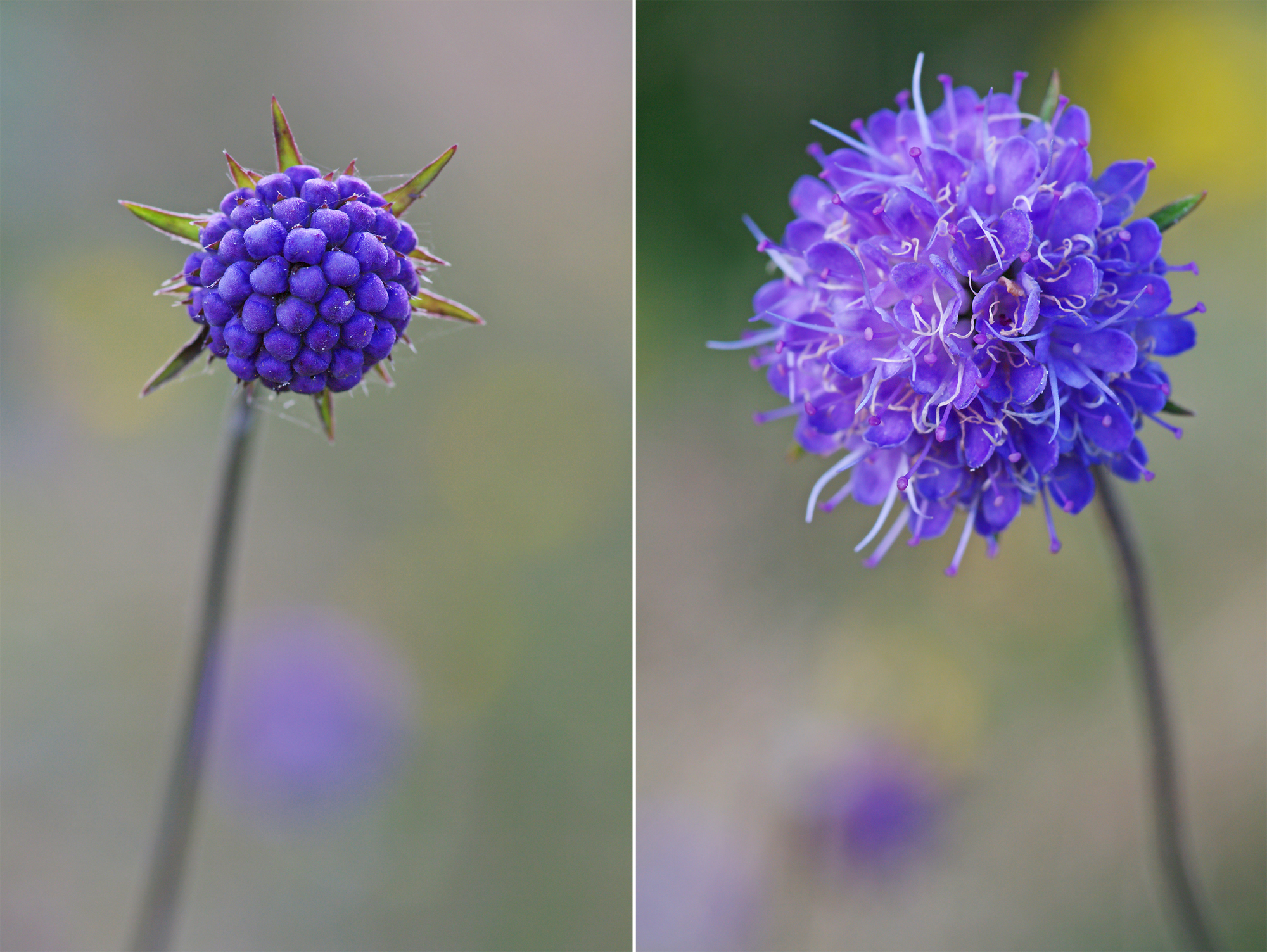
Devil's-bit scabious

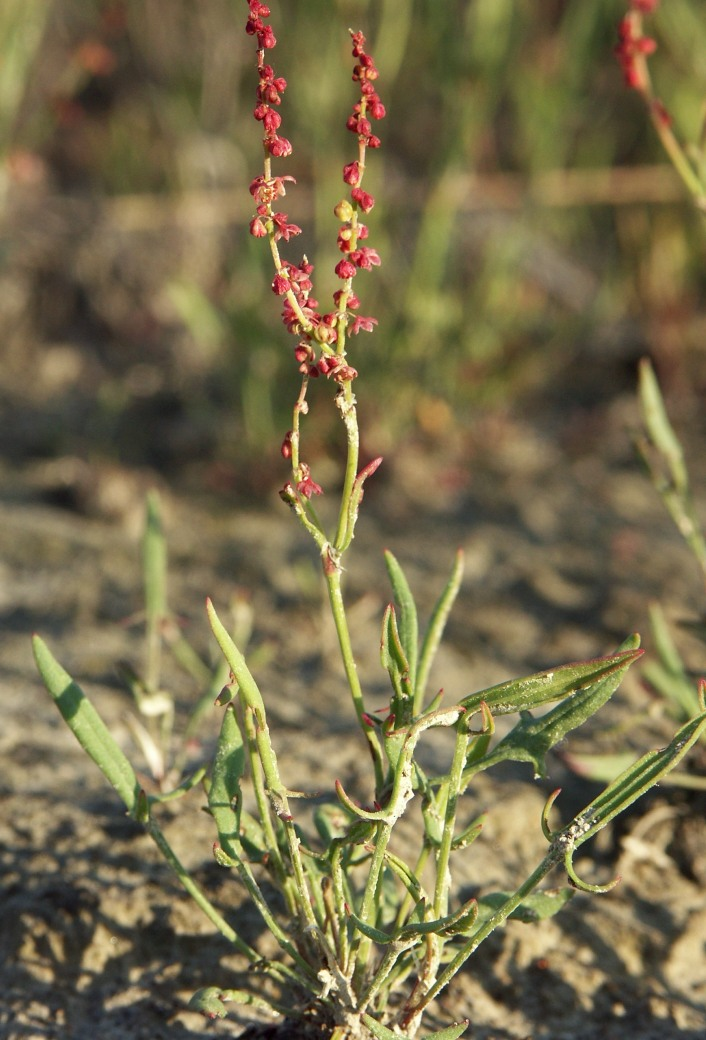
Sheep's sorrel

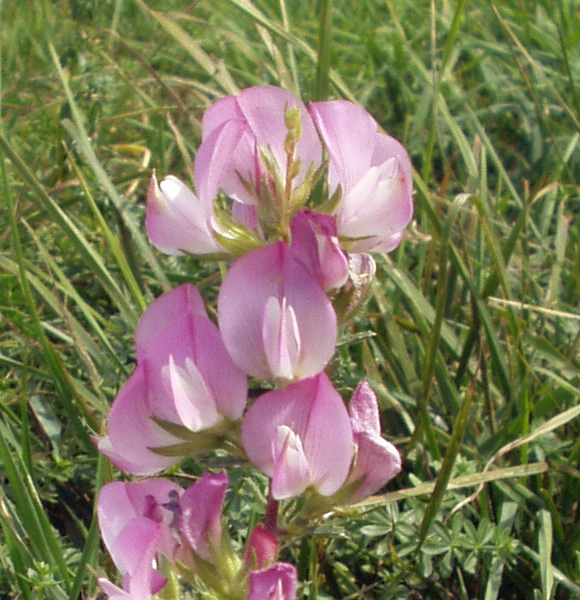
Spiny restharrow

== Condition and management ==
The site was assessed by Natural England as being in "unfavourable" but "recovering" condition in July 2008, after removal of scrub and changes to the way in which the area is grazed. According to Natural England, management requires avoidance of drainage or water extraction, as well as protection of the groundwater aquifer from excessive animal faeces and animal feed, fertilisers, lime, pesticides, herbicides and other agricultural chemicals. Some grazing is considered beneficial.

== See also ==
- List of Sites of Special Scientific Interest in Cheshire
