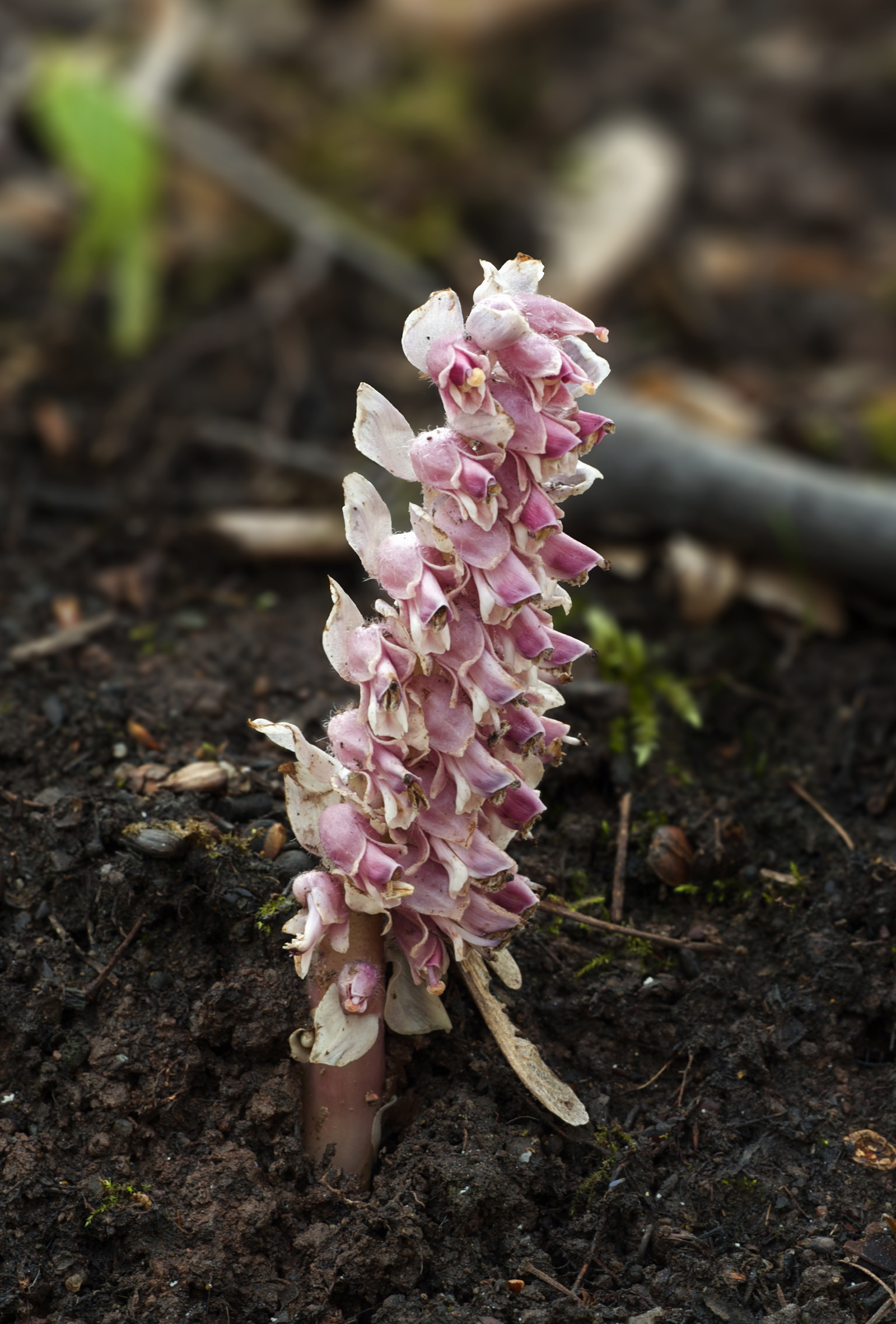

Scientific classification
- Kingdom: Plantae
- Clade: Tracheophytes
- Clade: Angiosperms
- Clade: Eudicots
- Clade: Asterids
- Order: Lamiales
- Family: Orobanchaceae
- Genus: Lathraea
- Species: L. squamaria

Binomial name
- Lathraea squamaria L.

= Lathraea squamaria =

Parasitic species of flowering plant

Lathraea squamaria, the common toothwort, is a species of flowering plant in the family Orobanchaceae. It is widely distributed in Europe and also occurs in Turkey.

It is parasitic on the roots of hazel and alder, and occasionally other trees, and represents the second occasion on which a member of the family Orobanchaceae lost the ability to photosynthesize and became parasitic. It occurs in shady places such as deciduous woodland and hedge sides. The plant consists of a branched whitish underground stem closely covered with thick, fleshy, colourless leaves, which are bent over so as to hide under the surface. The only portions that appear above ground in April to May are the short flower-bearing shoots, which bear a spike of two-lipped dull purple flowers, but is also able to produce cleistogamic underground flowers which fertilise themselves. It is also able to regenerate from broken fragments of the underground stem.

== Description ==
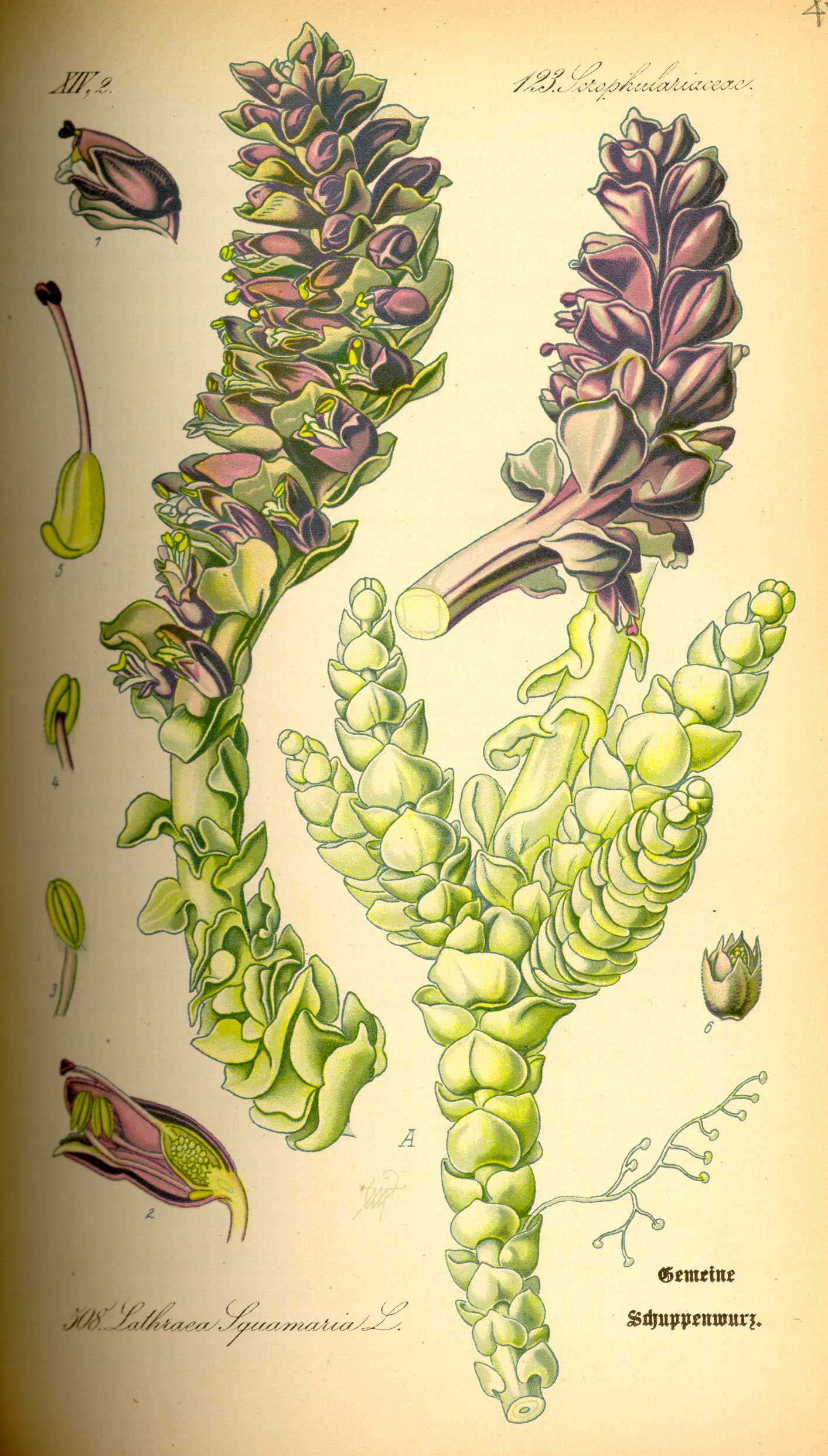
Common toothwort. Illustration from Thomé, Flora von Deutschland, Österreich und der Schweiz, 1885

Toothwort is a perennial plant producing clumps of flowering shoots in late spring. The low, hairy, creamy-pink flowering shoot grow in a one-sided spike to a height of 3 to 9 in (8 to 23 cm). The few scales on the stem represent the leaves, but the whole shoot is devoid of chlorophyll. The individual pinkish flowers are drooping and have short stalks, two lips and open mouths. The calyx teeth are blunt and hairy. The scales which represent the leaves also secrete water, which escapes and softens the ground around the plant. Externally they immediately reveal their heterotrophic character by their lack of chlorophyll and the reduction of their leaf area.

== Distribution and habitat ==
Common toothwort is widely distributed throughout Europe, its range extending from France and Norway to Russia, Bulgaria, Italy and Greece. In the British Isles, it is found in England and Northern Ireland, and less often in lowland areas of East England, Southwest England, Wales, Scotland and the Republic of Ireland. Its natural habitats are deciduous woodland, hedgerows and the banks of rivers and streams. It grows in Hatherton Flush, an SSSI in Cheshire.
