= Swangey Fen, Attleborough =

UK Site of Special Scientific Interest

Coordinates: 52.499°N 0.964°E

- Site of Special Scientific Interest
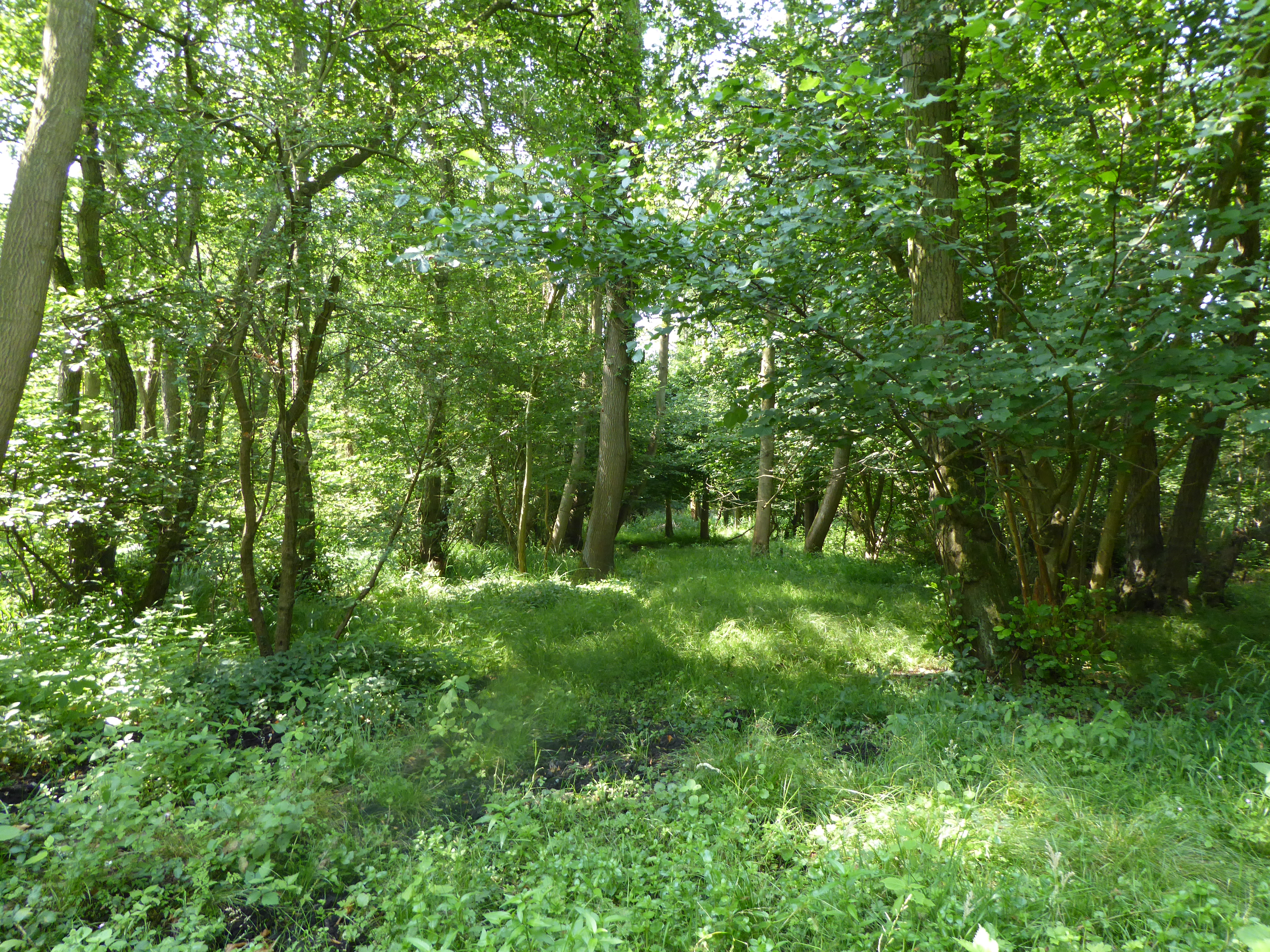
- Location of Swangey Fen, Attleborough.
- Area of search: Norfolk
- Grid reference: TM 013 931
- Interest: Biological
- Area: 48.4 hectares (120 acres)
- Notification date: 1984
- Location map: Magic Map

Swangey Fen, Attleborough is a 48.4-hectare (120-acre) biological Site of Special Scientific Interest south-west of Attleborough in Norfolk, England. It is part of the Norfolk Valley Fens Special Area of Conservation.

Part of the site is spring-fed fen with diverse flora, including grass of Parnassus, marsh helleborine and several rare mosses. The fen is surrounded by wet woodland and grassland.

Much of the site is private but there is public access to an area managed by the Norfolk Wildlife Trust off Fen Street.
