= Walgherton =

Village in Cheshire, England

Coordinates: 53.037°N 2.452°W

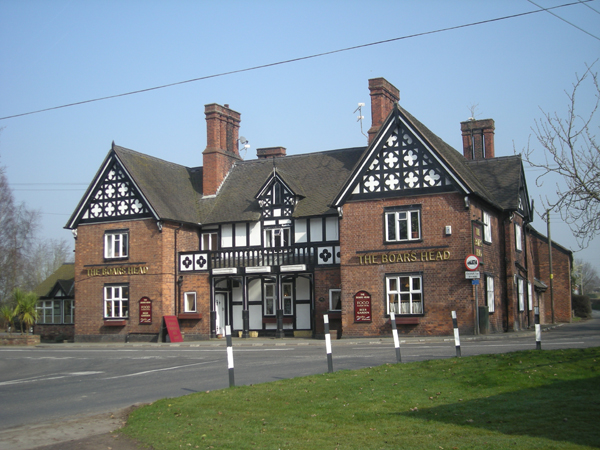
- The Boar's Head public house, Walgherton

- Location within Cheshire
- Population: 128 (2011)
- OS grid reference: SJ697489
- Civil parish: Walgherton
- Unitary authority: Cheshire East
- Ceremonial county: Cheshire
- Region: North West
- Country: England
- Sovereign state: United Kingdom
- Post town: NANTWICH
- Postcode district: CW5
- Dialling code: 01270
- Police: Cheshire
- Fire: Cheshire
- Ambulance: North West
- UK Parliament: Crewe and Nantwich

Walgherton is a village and civil parish in the unitary authority of Cheshire East and the ceremonial county of Cheshire, England. The village lies at SJ697489 by the junction of the A51 and B5071 roads, 3½ miles to the south east of Nantwich and 4½ miles to the south of Crewe. The civil parish also includes the small settlement of Hussey's Nook. The total population is just under 130 people. Sand has been extracted at Hough Mill Quarry. The remainder of the parish is predominantly agricultural. Nearby villages include Hatherton, Stapeley and Wybunbury.

== History ==
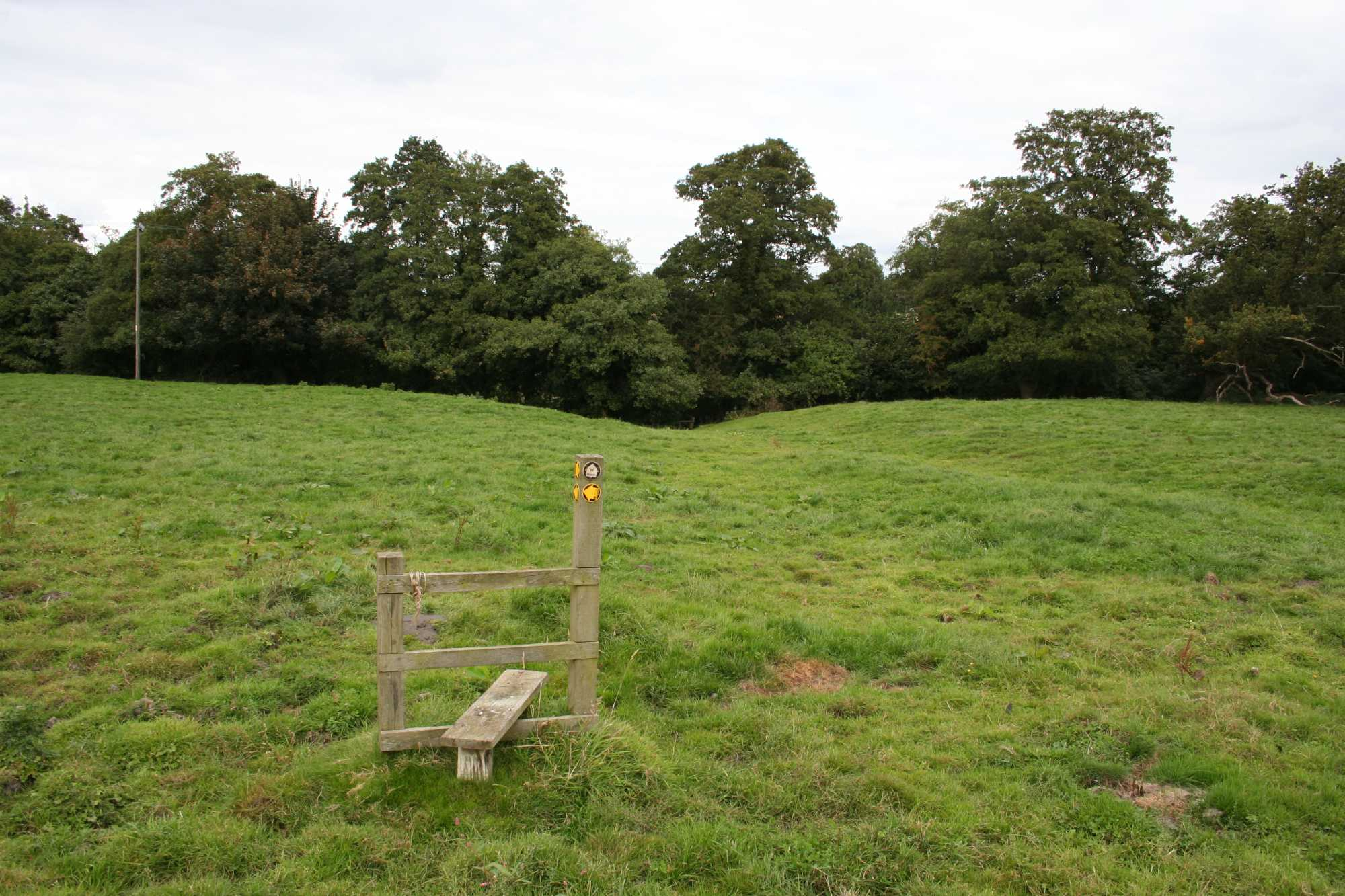
Pasture near Oat Eddish Farm

A denarius, a silver Roman coin, was found in the parish, but there is no other evidence of Roman occupation. There might have been a Saxon farmstead in the area of Oat Eddish farm, whose name derives from Old English and means "enclosed land where oats are grown". Walgherton appears in the Domesday Book of 1086 as "Walcretune" and was held by William Malbank.

During the Second World War, there was an anti-aircraft battery in the parish, documented in 1941–42.

== Governance ==
Walgherton is administered jointly with the adjacent parish of Hatherton by Hatherton & Walgherton Parish Council. From 1974 the civil parish was served by Crewe and Nantwich Borough Council, which was succeeded on 1 April 2009 by the unitary authority of Cheshire East. Walgherton falls in the parliamentary constituency of Crewe and Nantwich, which has been represented by Kieran Mullan since 2019, after being represented by Laura Smith (2017–19), Edward Timpson (2008–17) and Gwyneth Dunwoody (1983–2008).

== Geography, economics and transport ==
The A51 (London Road) runs from the north east to the south west through the parish and is crossed by the B5071 (Crewe Road–Wybunbury Lane), which runs south west to north east to Wybunbury; the village is centred at the junction. Back Lane connects the A51 and B5071. The National Cycle Network route 70 follows the B5071 and two legs of the "A Walk around Wybunbury" footpath cross the parish.

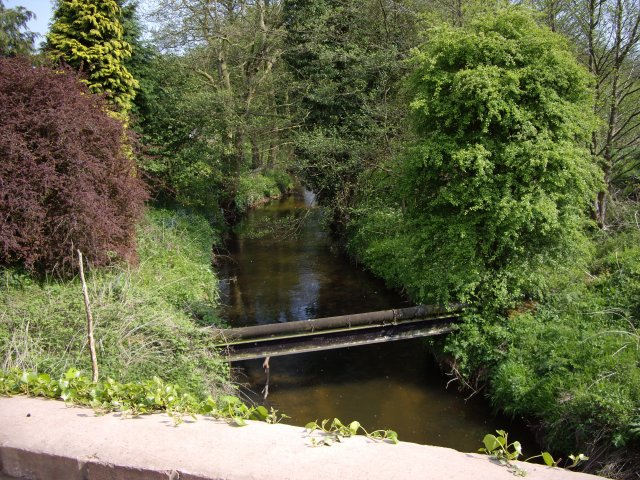
Forge Brook

Howbeck and Wybunbury Brooks form part of the parish's northern boundary, and are crossed by the A51 at Howbeck Bridge. Another brook runs north west to south east through the parish and forms a short stretch of the south-western boundary. Forge Brook forms part of the eastern boundary.

The main land use is agricultural. The terrain is predominantly gently sloping with steeper stream valleys; the low point of 45 metres is at Howbeck Bridge in the west, and the terrain slopes upwards towards the east, south and north of the parish with multiple high points of around 75 metres. There are several small areas of woodland, including Ballaglass, George's Wood, The Oaks, Perry's Rough, Speakman's Moss, Sprinks, Walgherton Pool and part of Jerusalem, and multiple small meres and pools lie within the woodland as well as scattered across the farmland. The Hough Mill Quarry (used for sand extraction) is in the east of the parish, by Back Lane, and includes an unnamed pool. Dagfields Craft Centre is off Crewe Road.

== Demography ==
According to the 2001 Census, the parish had a population of 121, increasing to 128 in 56 households at the 2011 Census. This represents a decline from the population of 1851, possibly in part caused by boundary changes; historical population figures are 211 (1801), 213 (1851), 178 (1901) and 199 (1951). The population density was 0.4 persons/hectare in 2011, well below the average of 3.2 persons/hectare for Cheshire East.

== Landmarks ==
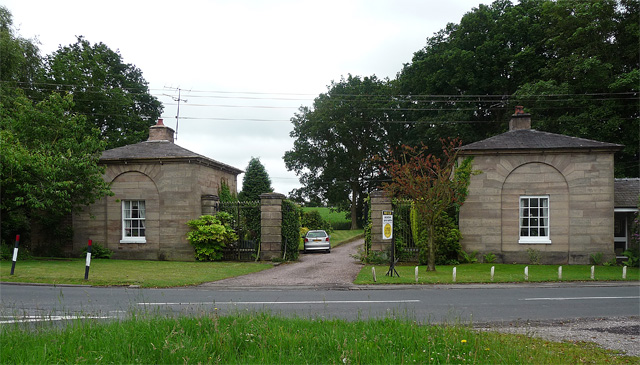
Gate lodges to Doddington Hall

The Cottage and Thatchers, both on London Road, are two half-timbered cottages dating from the 17th century, which are listed at grade II, the lowest grade. The paired former gate lodges of Doddington Hall stand on Crewe Road near Walgherton village. Constructed in yellow sandstone, they are by Samuel Wyatt, also the architect of the hall, and date from the late 18th century. They are also listed at grade II. The Boar's Head public house stands in Walgherton village.

== Education ==
As of 2016, there are no schools within the civil parish. Walgherton falls within the catchment areas of Wybunbury Delves Church of England Primary School in Wybunbury for primary education and Shavington Academy in Shavington for secondary education.

== See also ==
- Listed buildings in Walgherton
