= Acid grassland =

Nutrient-poor habitat

Acid grassland is a nutrient-poor habitat characterised by grassy tussocks and bare ground.

== Habitat ==
The vegetation is dominated by grasses and herbaceous plants, growing on soils deficient in lime (calcium). These may be found on acid sedimentary rock such as sandstone; acid igneous rock such as granite; and fluvial or glacial deposits such as sand and gravel. Typical plants of lowland acid grassland in Britain include common bent grass, Agrostis capillaris, wavy hair-grass, Deschampsia flexuosa, bristle bent grass, Agrostis curtisii, tormentil, Potentilla erecta, and flowers such as sheep's sorrel, Rumex acetosella and heath bedstraw, Galium saxatile.

== In Britain ==
In Britain, under 30,000 hectares of lowland acid grassland remain, often on common land and nature reserves. It is considered a nationally important habitat; areas are found in London on freely-draining sandy and gravelly soils. 271 Sites of Special Scientific Interest have been notified with acid grassland as a principal reason for the designation. Greater London's Richmond Park, Epping Forest and Wimbledon Common are all Special Areas of Conservation with considerable areas of acid grassland.
