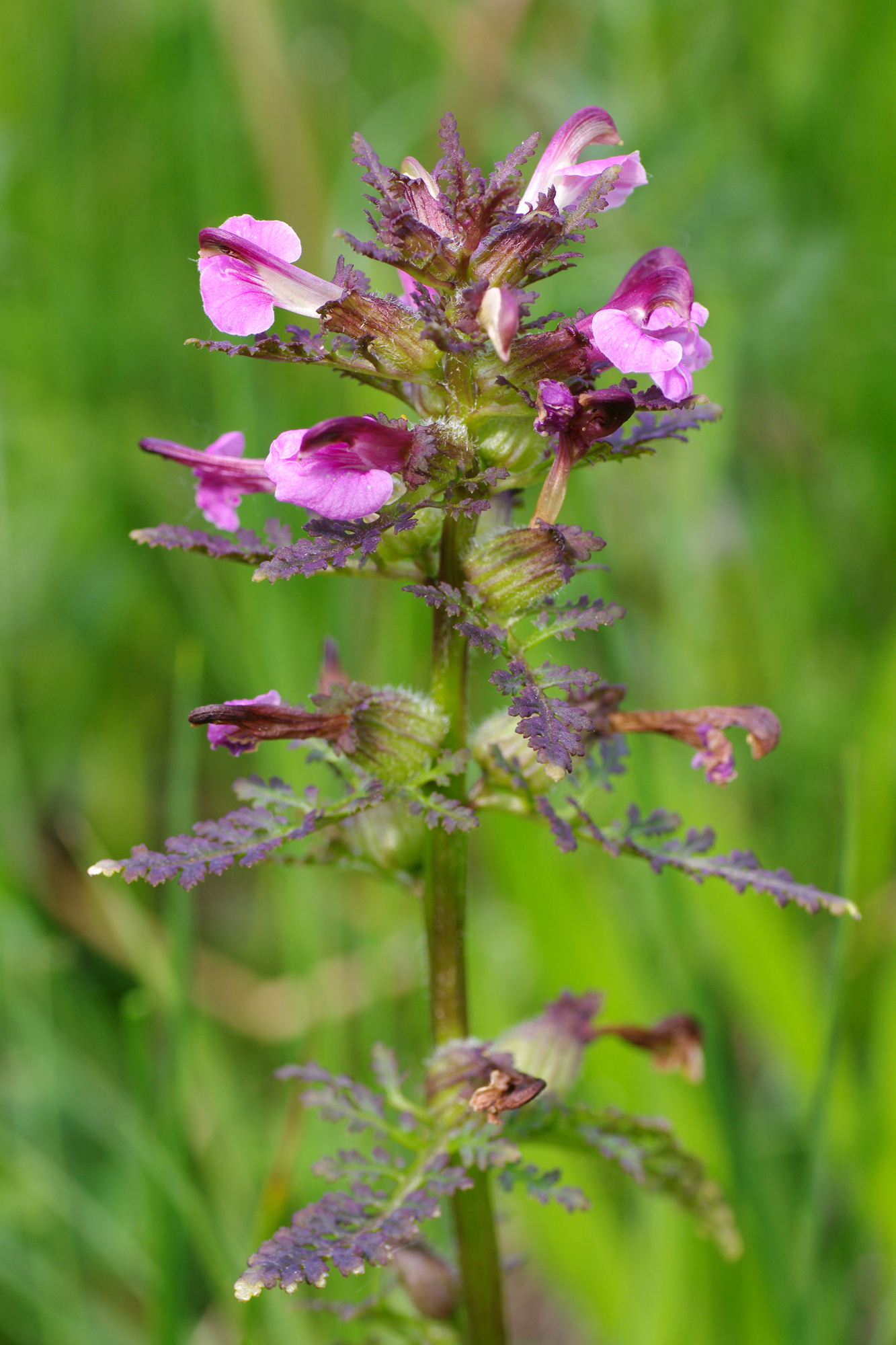

Conservation status
- Least Concern (IUCN 3.1)

Scientific classification
- Kingdom: Plantae
- Clade: Tracheophytes
- Clade: Angiosperms
- Clade: Eudicots
- Clade: Asterids
- Order: Lamiales
- Family: Orobanchaceae
- Genus: Pedicularis
- Species: P. palustris

Binomial name
- Pedicularis palustris Carl Linnaeus, 1753

= Pedicularis palustris =

Marsh lousewort

Species of flowering plant

Pedicularis palustris, commonly known as marsh lousewort, is a plant species in the family Orobanchaceae. It is native to central and northern Europe and Asia where it grows in wetlands and boggy habitats. The International Union for Conservation of Nature has assessed its conservation status as being of least concern.

== Description ==
The nominate subspecies Pedicularis palustris subsp. palustris, which occurs in the west of the range, is a straggly biennial plant with a much-branched, usually erect stem up to 60 cm (24 in) tall. The leaves are alternate or opposite, with a short stalk. The leaf blades are triangular-lanceolate to linear, with pinnate lobes and toothed margins. The inflorescence is a raceme with leaf-like bracts. Each bilaterally symmetrical flower has a short stalk and a large, rounded, toothed calyx. The flower is reddish-purple and up to 2.5 cm (1 in) long, with five petals fused into a tube, the upper lip being slightly shorter than the lower lip. The fruit is a capsule. The other subspecies, Pedicularis palustris subsp. karoi, which occurs in the east of the range, is an annual plant and has smaller flowers. This species can be distinguished from common lousewort (Pedicularis sylvatica) by having two calyx lobes rather than four, and four small teeth at the tip of the upper lip rather than two. It is also taller and more erect, and is found in wetter locations.

== Distribution and habitat ==
Marsh lousewort is found in central and northern Europe and Asia. In Europe, it occurs in Scandinavia and southwards through most of Europe at altitudes of up to 1,200 m (4,000 ft). In the British Isles, it mostly occurs in Scotland, Ireland, Wales, western England and East Anglia. In Asia, it occurs in Russia, Kazakhstan, Mongolia and northern China. Typical habitat is wetlands, swamps, fens, marshes, wet meadows and ditches.

== Ecology ==
Marsh lousewort is a semi-parasitic plant, the roots sucking nourishment from adjacent plants. The flowers are pollinated by honey bees and bumblebees; these land on the lower lip, which droops under their weight allowing them to thrust their head inside the flower and extract the nectar, getting powdered with pollen at the same time.
