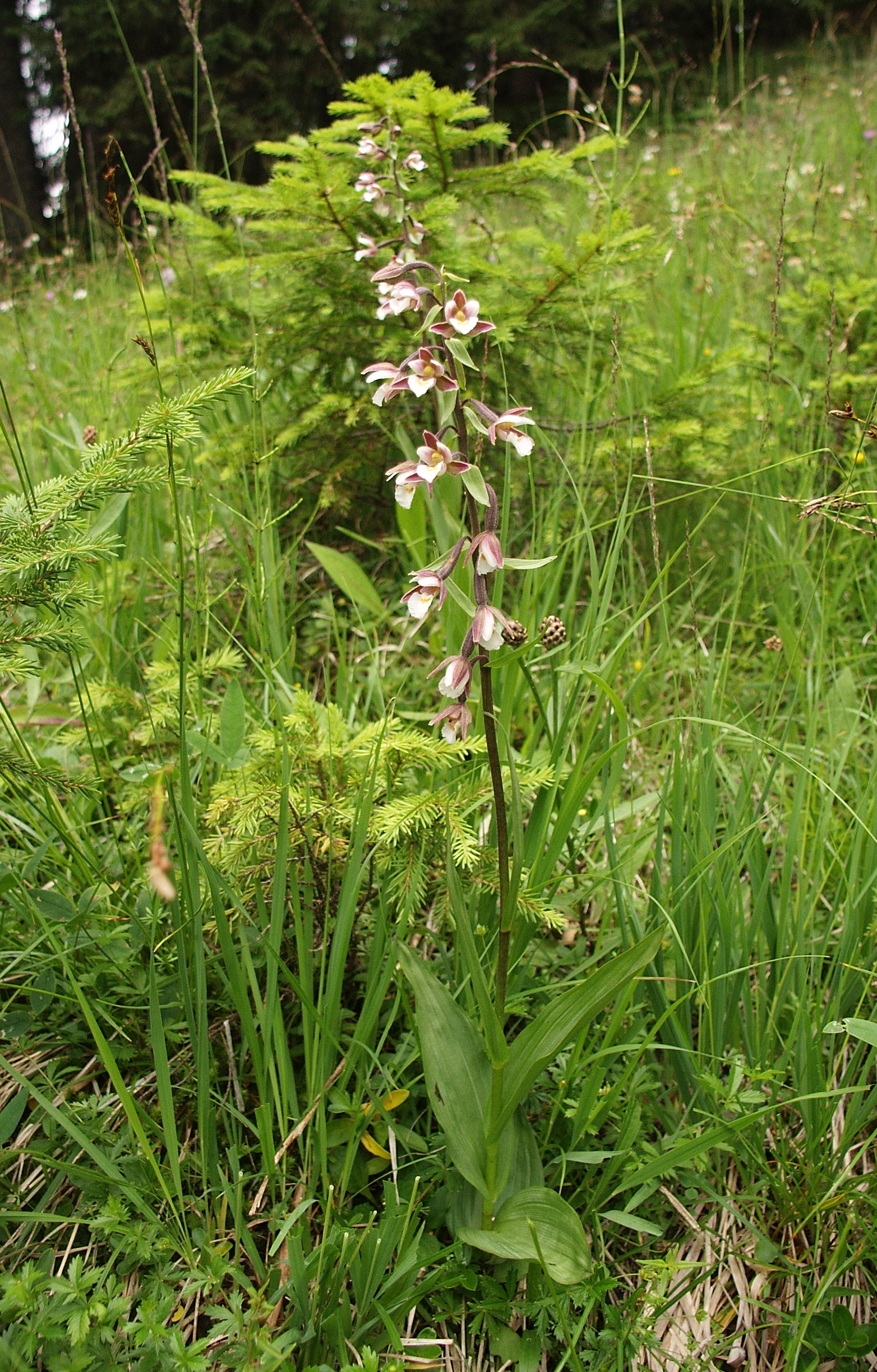

Scientific classification
- Kingdom: Plantae
- Clade: Tracheophytes
- Clade: Angiosperms
- Clade: Monocots
- Order: Asparagales
- Family: Orchidaceae
- Subfamily: Epidendroideae
- Genus: Epipactis
- Species: E. palustris

Binomial name
- Epipactis palustris (L.) Crantz

= Epipactis palustris =

Species of orchid

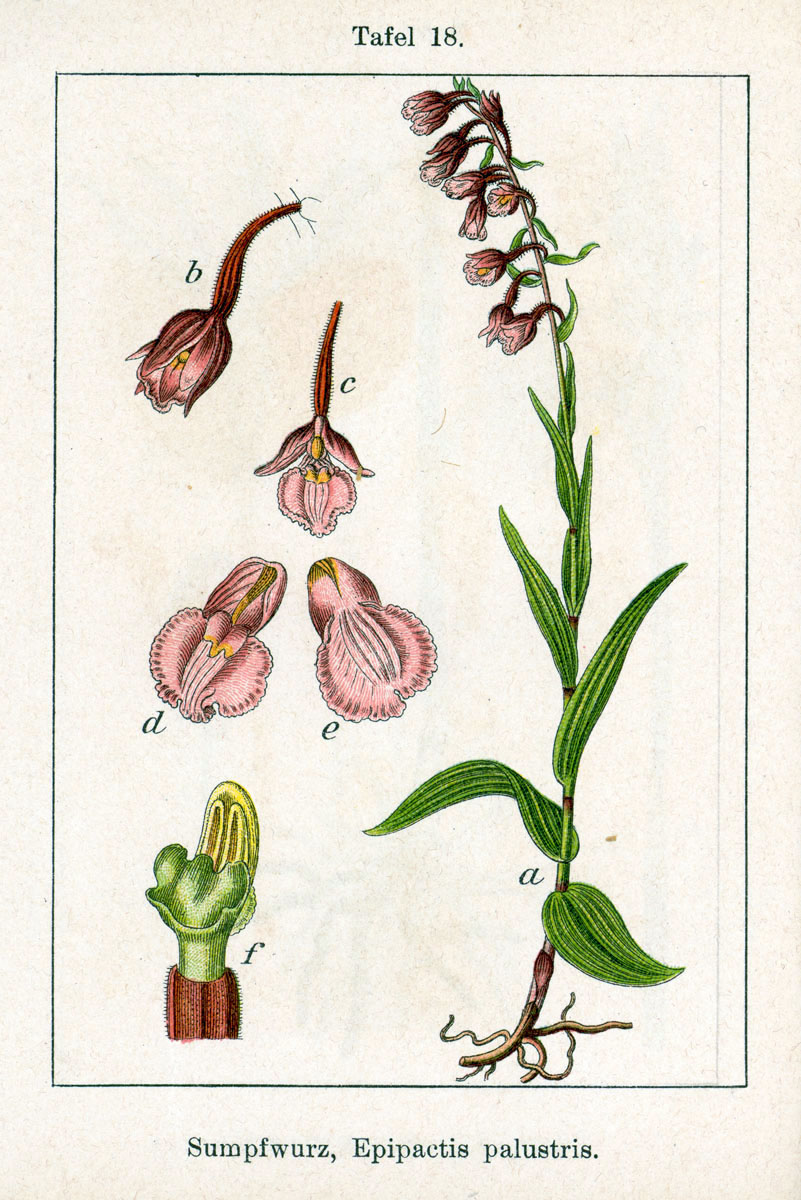
Botanical drawing: Sturm

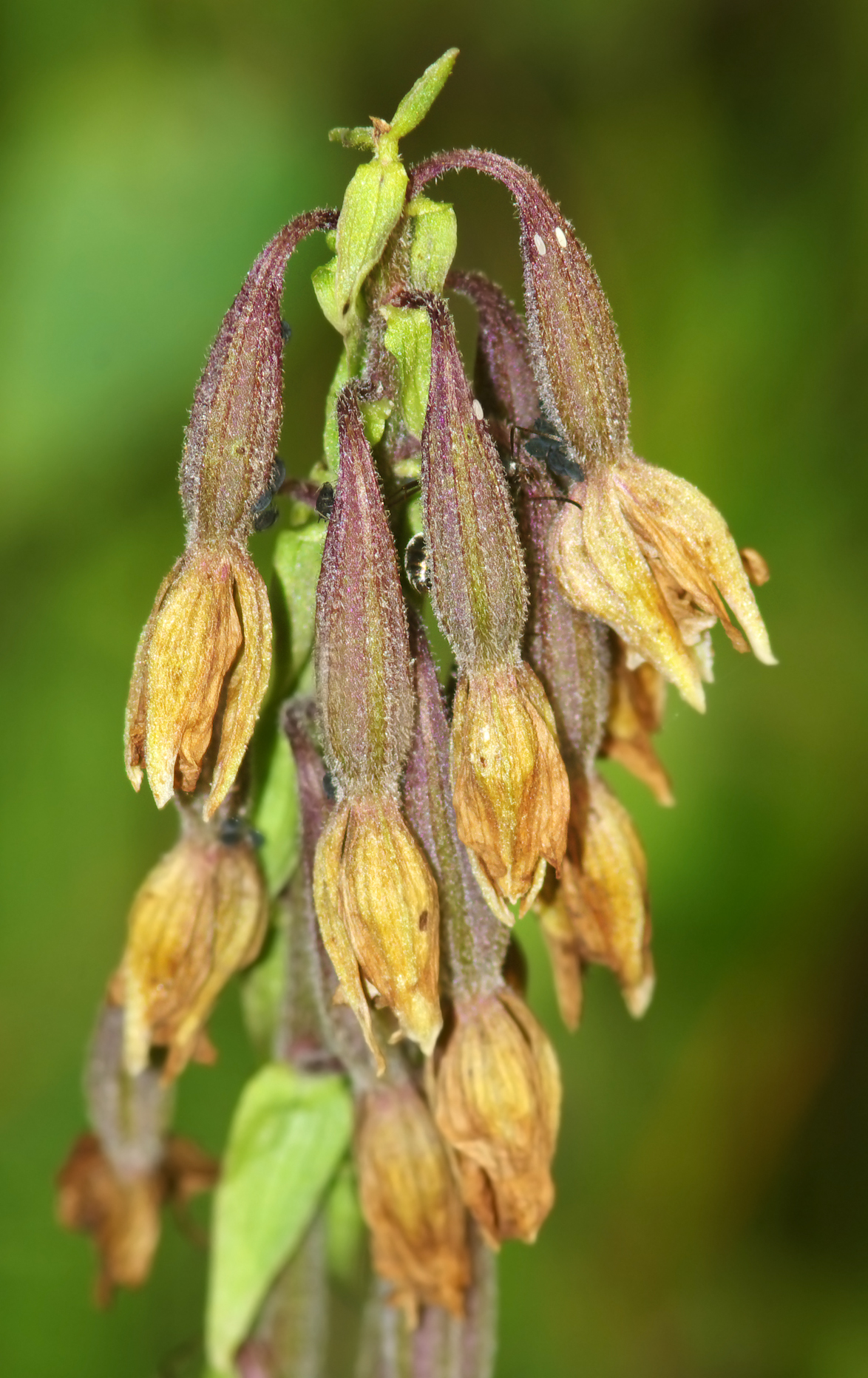
Epipactis palustris - fruits

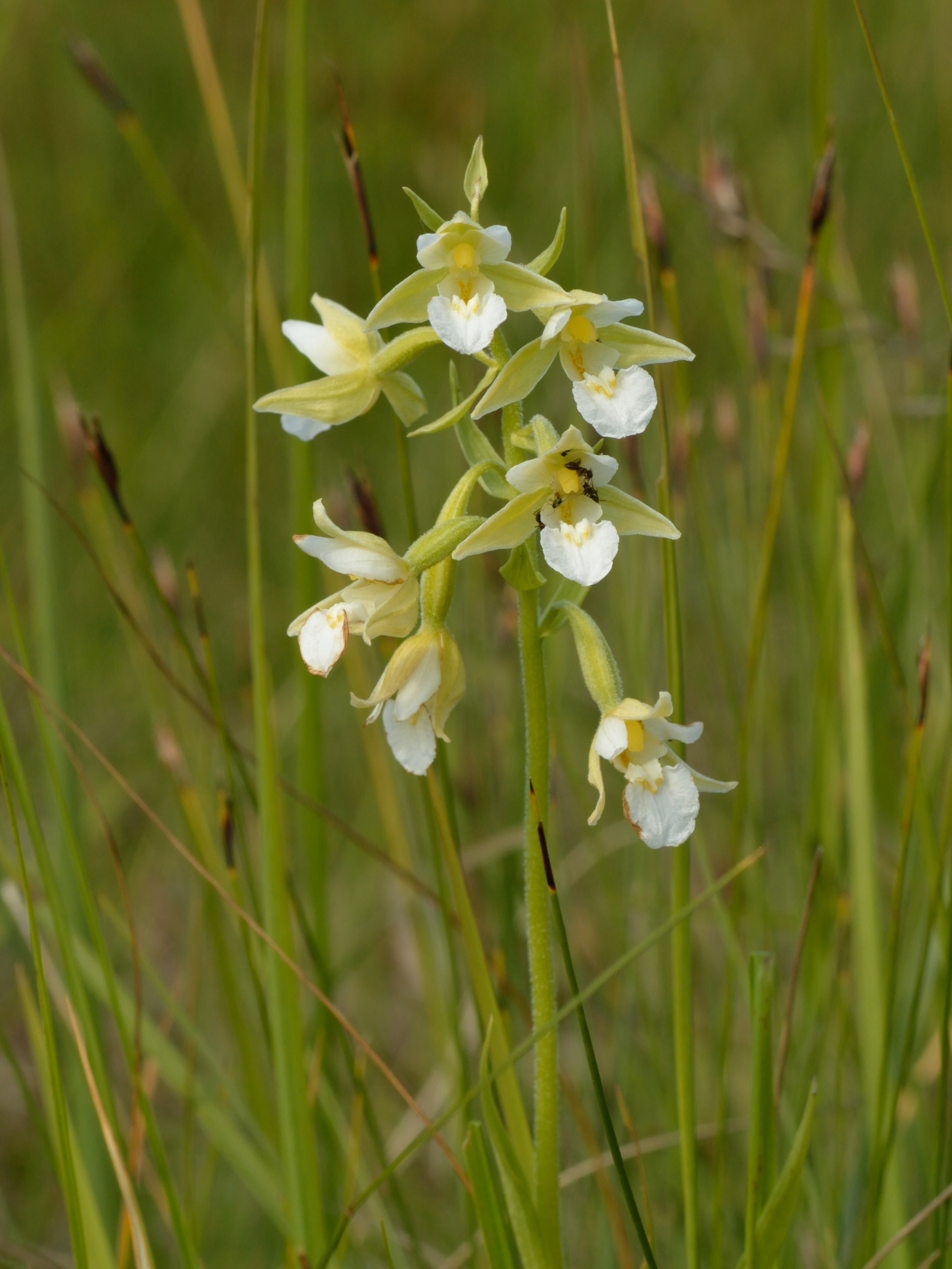
Epipactis palustris var. ochroleuca – pale variety

Epipactis palustris, the marsh helleborine, is a species of orchid native to Europe and Asia.

== Description ==
Epipactis palustris is a perennial herbaceous plant. This species has a stem growing to 60 cm high with as many as ten erect leaves up to 12 cm long and up to 4 cm wide, with parallel venation. It persists as an underground horizontal stem called a rhizome, from which new roots and stems grow each year. The aerial part of the stem is upright and has a cylindrical section. The base of the aerial stem is glabrous (smooth) and surrounded with pink scales, the upper part of the stem is pubescent and slightly reddened. The flowers are 17 mm across arranged in a one-sided raceme. In the typical form, the sepals are coloured deep pink or purplish-red, the upper petals shorter and paler. The labellum at least as long as the sepals, white with red or yellow spots in the middle. Variants without most of the reddish colours of the typical form have been called E. palustris var. ochroleuca. The fruit is a many-ribbed capsule, containing a large number of minute seeds.

== Distribution and habitat ==
Europe, including the United Kingdom and Mediterranean countries, Turkey, north Iraq, the Caucasus, north Iran, West and East Siberia and Central Asia. This species occurs in the Sarmatic mixed forests ecoregion.

Epipactis palustris is typically found in humid woodland and grassland, as well as in marshes, dune slacks and bogs. It prefers a calcareous substrate with a basic pH, low nutrient availability and medium wet.

== Pollination and ecology ==
Each flower contains male and female organs of reproduction. Flowers produce nectar and are pollinated by wasps, bees and Diptera.

Orchids rely on a symbiotic relationship with soil fungi, which gives them access to more soil nutrients. Epipactis palustris is specialised compared to other Epipactis species, partnering mainly with fungal species in the order Helotiales, but also to a much lesser degree with Sebacina, Tulasnella, Thelephora and Ceratobasidium in descending order of frequency.

== Etymology ==
Epipactis is a Greek word the meaning of which is disputed, but some have translated it as "grow above". The species epithet palustris is Latin for "of the marsh" and indicates its common habitat.

"Helleborine" may refer to deer using the orchid for food (many conservationists have noted that helleborine orchids are grazed by deer.). Alternatively it may denote that the plants are similar to hellebores (a group of species in the family Ranunculaceae), possibly because many species of orchid closely related to E. palustris have green flowers like the hellebores. "Hellebore" comes from the Greek "álkē" and "bora", translating as "fawn" and "food of beasts".

Variation in flower colour
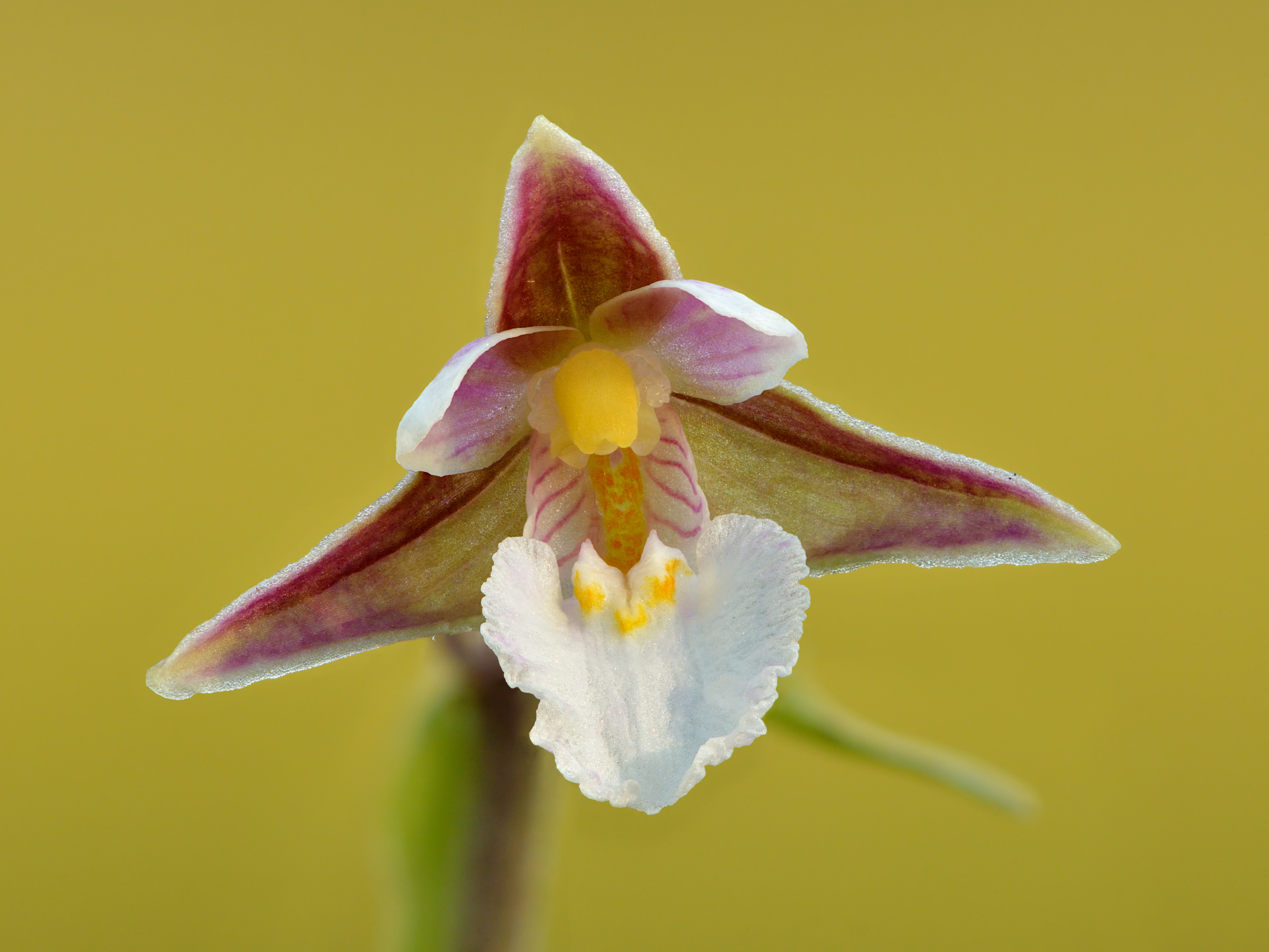
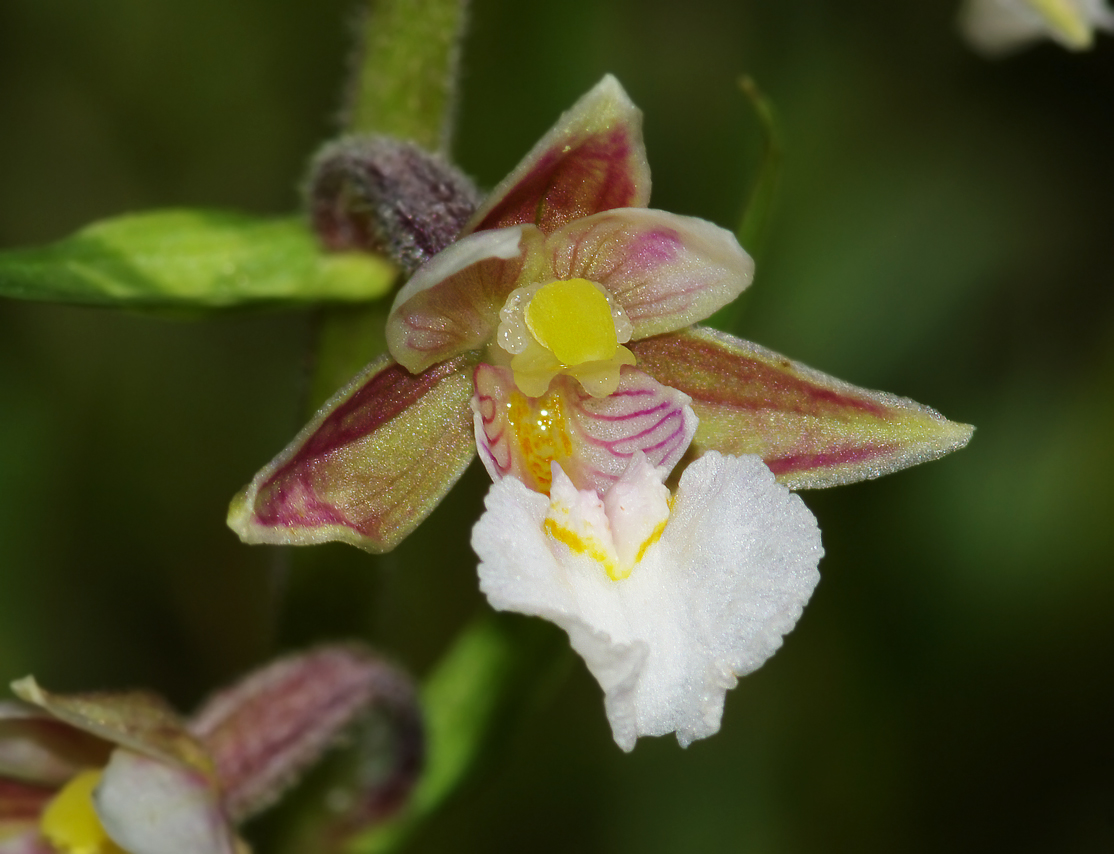
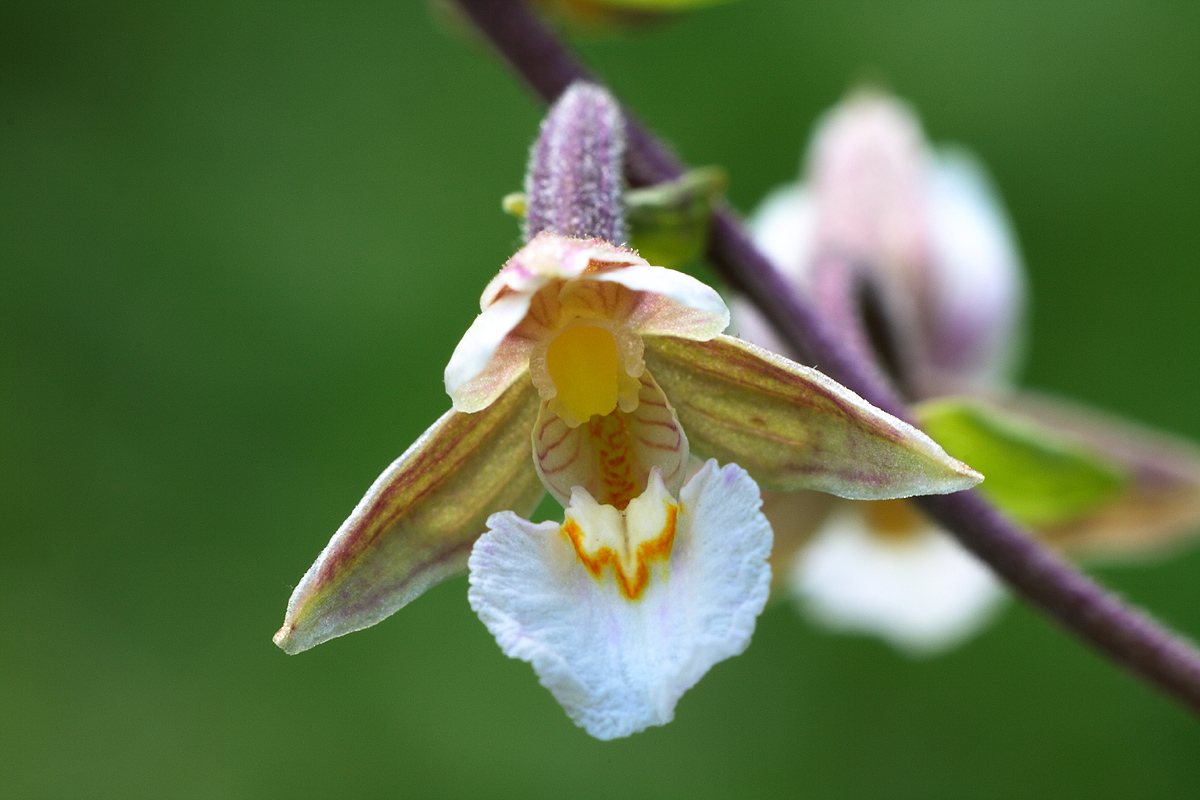
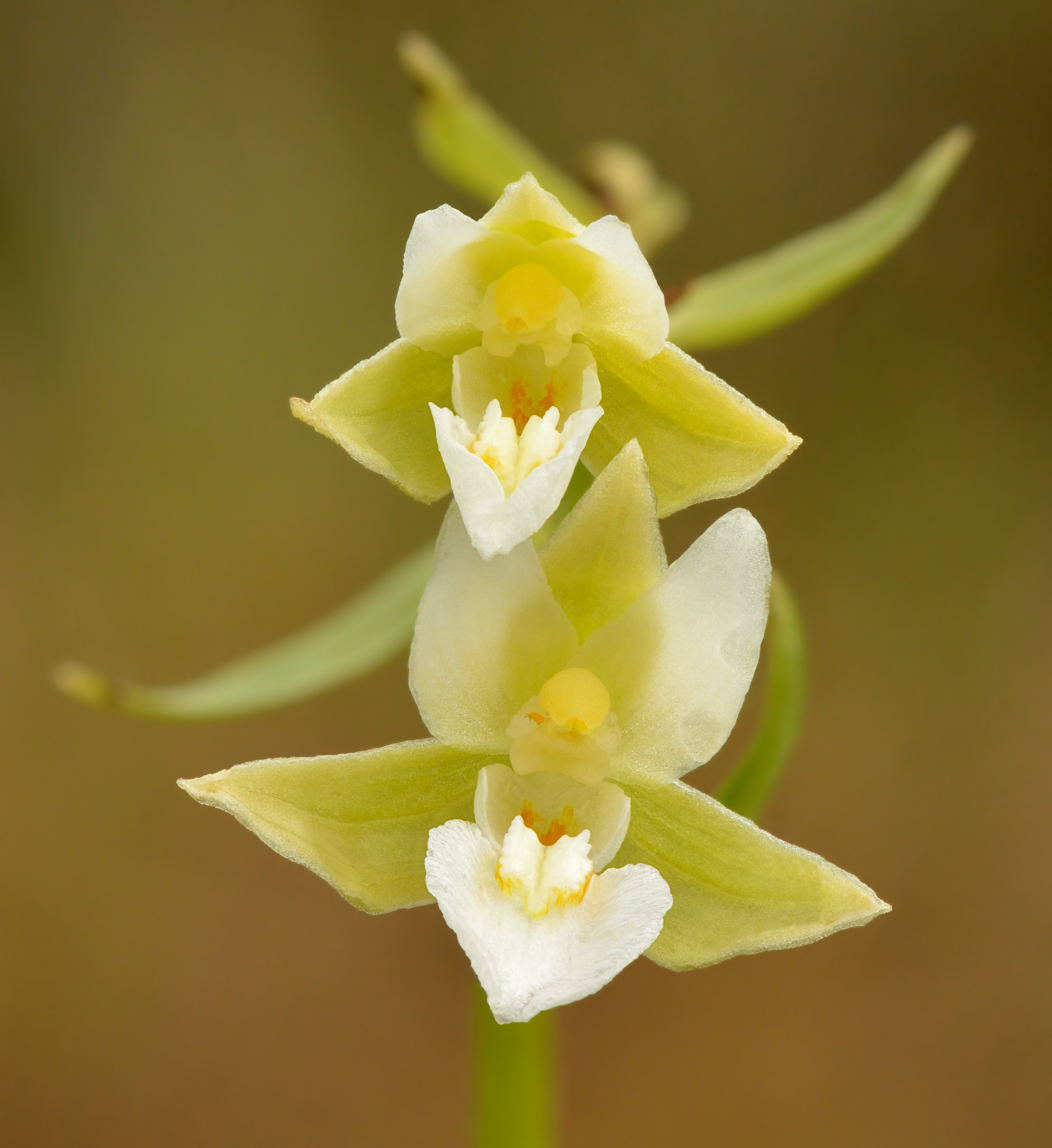
