= Crewe Hall =

Historic house in Cheshire, England

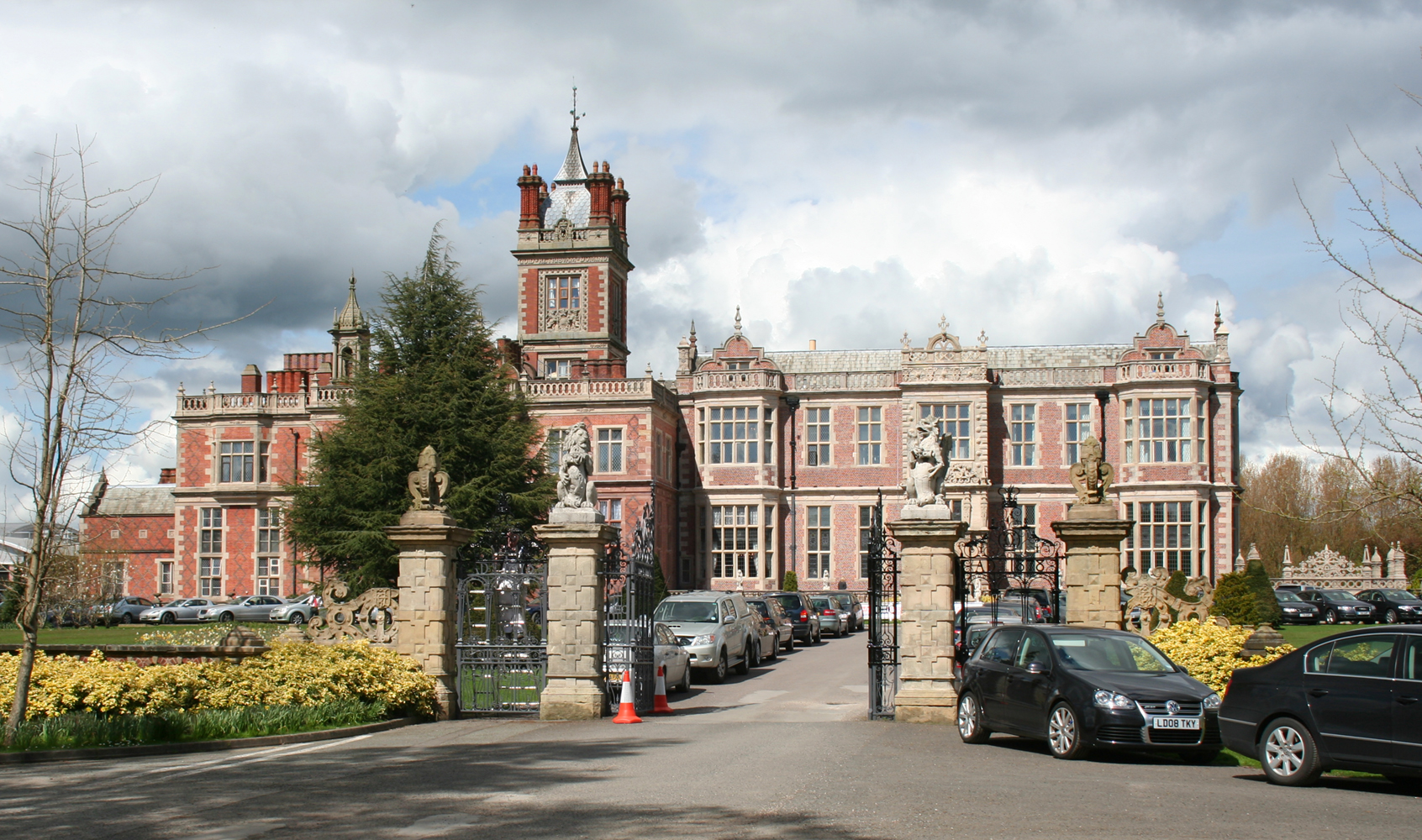
- Crewe Hall: south face and entrance gates

Location map and quick summary
Location in Cheshire
53.083°N 2.399°W
Location	Crewe Green, Cheshire, England
History
Built	1615–36
Built for	Sir Randolph Crewe
Site notes
Architectural style	Jacobean
Restored	1866
Restored by	E. M. Barry
Current use	Hotel and restaurant
Website	crewehallcheshire.co.uk
Listed Building – Grade I
Official name	Crewe Hall
Designated	20 January 1975
Reference no.	1138666

Crewe Hall is a Jacobean mansion located near Crewe Green, east of Crewe, in Cheshire, England. Described by Nikolaus Pevsner as one of the two finest Jacobean houses in Cheshire, it is listed at grade I. Built in 1615–36 for Sir Randolph Crewe, it was one of the county's largest houses in the 17th century, and was said to have "brought London into Cheshire".

The hall was extended in the late 18th century and altered by Edward Blore in the early Victorian era. It was extensively restored by E. M. Barry after a fire in 1866, and is considered among his best works. Other artists and craftsmen employed during the restoration include J. Birnie Philip, J. G. Crace, Henry Weekes and the firm of Clayton and Bell. The interior is elaborately decorated and contains many fine examples of wood carving, chimneypieces and plasterwork, some of which are Jacobean in date.

The park was landscaped during the 18th century by Capability Brown, William Emes, John Webb and Humphry Repton, and formal gardens were designed by W. A. Nesfield in the 19th century. On the estate are cottages designed by Nesfield's son, William Eden Nesfield, which Pevsner considered to have introduced features such as tile hanging and pargetting into Cheshire. The stables quadrangle is contemporary with the hall and is listed at grade II*.

The hall remained the seat of various branches of the Crewe family until 1936, when the land was sold to the Duchy of Lancaster. It was used as offices after the Second World War, serving as the headquarters for the Wellcome Foundation for nearly thirty years. As of 2025, it is used as a hotel, restaurant and health club.

== History ==
=== Sir Randolph Crewe, Civil War and the Restoration ===
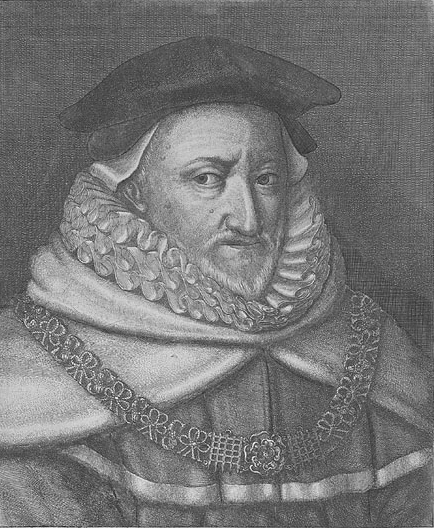
Sir Randolph Crewe

Crewe was the seat of the de Crewe (or de Criwa) family in the 12th and 13th centuries; they built a timber-framed manor house there in around 1170. The manor passed to the de Praers family of Barthomley in 1319 by the marriage of Johanna de Crewe to Richard de Praers. Later in the 14th century it passed to the Fouleshurst (or Foulehurst) family, who held the manor jointly with that of Barthomley until around 1575, when the estate was dispersed. Legal problems resulted in the lands being acquired by Sir Christopher Hatton, from whose heirs Sir Randolph Crewe (1559–1646) purchased an extensive estate including the manors of Crewe, Barthomley and Haslington in 1608 for over £6,000 (£1.32 million today).

Born in nearby Nantwich, reputedly the son of a tanner, Sir Randolph (or Ranulph) had risen through the legal profession to become a judge, member of parliament and the parliamentary Speaker. His fortune derived from his successful practice in chancery and other London courts. He briefly served as Lord Chief Justice in 1625–26, but was dismissed by Charles I for his refusal to endorse a forced loan without the consent of parliament. He divided his enforced retirement between his London house and the Crewe estate. In 1615, he commenced building a substantial hall at Crewe, either adjacent to the old house, which was by then in disrepair, or after demolishing it. He later wrote that "it hath pleased God of his abundant goodness to reduce the house and Mannor of the name to the name againe."

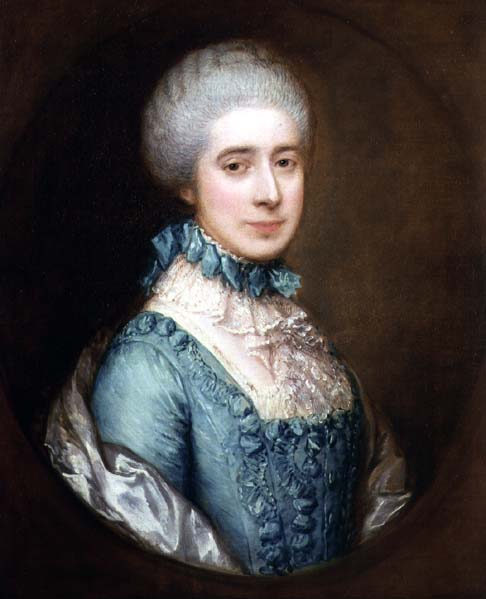
Frances Crewe, by Thomas Gainsborough

A few years after the hall's completion in 1636, Civil War broke out. Like most of the legal families of Cheshire, the Crewe family was parliamentarian, and the hall was used as a garrison. In December 1643, royalist forces under the command of Lord Byron occupied the area as they surrounded Nantwich, a major parliamentarian stronghold early in the First Civil War which lay some 5 miles (8 km) to the south west. A contemporary diarist, Edward Burghall, vicar of nearby Acton, described the subsequent action: "The royalists laid siege to Crewe Hall, where they within the house slew sixty, and wounded many, on St. John's Day; but wanting victuals and ammunition, they were forced to yield it up the next day, and themselves, a hundred and thirty-six, became prisoners, stout and valiant soldiers, having quarter for life granted them." On 4 February 1644, shortly after the decisive parliamentarian victory at the Battle of Nantwich, the hall was retaken by Sir Thomas Fairfax's forces.

Sir Randolph Crewe died a couple of years later, before the end of the First Civil War. His male line died out in 1684, and the hall passed to the Offley family by the marriage of Sir Randolph's great-granddaughter, Anne Crewe, to John Offley of Madeley Old Manor, Staffordshire. Their eldest son, also John (1681–1749), took the name Crewe in 1708. The Offley–Crewe family was very wealthy at this time: John Offley Crewe's income at his death was estimated at £15,000 per year (£2.9 million today). Both John Offley Crewe and his son John Crewe (1709–1752) served as members of parliament for Cheshire.

=== Barons Crewe and Marquess of Crewe ===
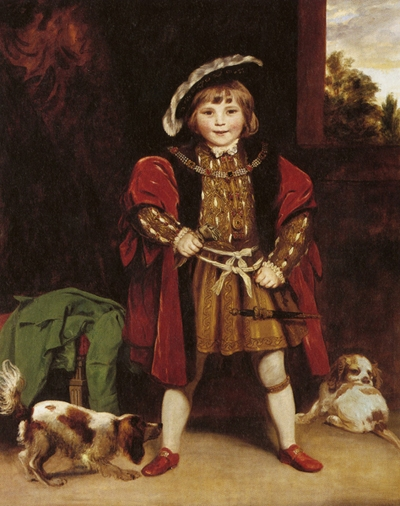
Second Baron Crewe as a child, by Sir Joshua Reynolds (Master Crewe as Henry VIII), c. 1775.

Anne Crewe's great-grandson, John Crewe (1742–1829), was created the first Baron Crewe in 1806. A prominent Whig politician, he was a lifelong friend and supporter of Charles James Fox; his wife Frances Crewe (née Greville; 1748–1818) was a famous beauty and political hostess who gave lavish entertainments at the hall. The Crewes' social circle included many of the major figures of the day, and visitors to the hall during this period included politicians Fox and George Canning, philosopher Edmund Burke, playwright Richard Brinsley Sheridan, poet William Spencer, musicologist Charles Burney, and artists Sir Joshua Reynolds and Sir Thomas Lawrence. John Crewe had the park landscaped and the hall extended, and also had the interior remodelled in the neo-Classical style then fashionable. Some forty years later, his grandson Hungerford Crewe (1812–94) went to considerable expense to have the interiors redecorated in a more sympathetic Jacobethan style.

The house was insured in 1857 for £10,000 (£1 million today); the contents at that time included books and wines (insured for £2,250), mathematical and musical instruments (£250), and pictures (£1,000). The art collection included several family portraits and other works by Sir Joshua Reynolds, which were saved from the fire that gutted the building early in January 1866. Extensive restoration work for Hungerford Crewe was completed in 1870.

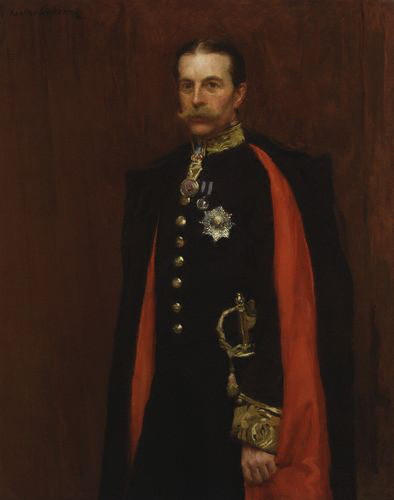
Robert Crewe-Milnes, by Walter Osborne

Hungerford Crewe never married and on his death in 1894, the barony became extinct. The hall was inherited by his nephew, Robert Milnes, Baron Houghton (1858–1945), the son of Annabella Hungerford Crewe; he adopted the name Crewe, to become Crewe-Milnes. The Crewe title was revived as an earldom for him in 1895, and he later became the Marquess of Crewe. A Liberal politician and poet, Crewe-Milnes held several key Cabinet positions between 1905 and 1916, and was a trusted aide to Asquith. He was also a friend of George V, and the King and Queen Mary stayed at the hall for three days in 1913, while touring the Staffordshire Potteries.

The Crewe-Milnes family left Crewe Hall in 1922, and the house stood empty until the Second World War. Crewe-Milnes offered the hall to Cheshire County Council as a gift in 1931, ostensibly because his heirs did not wish to live in the house. After the council's refusal, the majority of the estate was sold to the Duchy of Lancaster in 1936. His grandson, writer Quentin Crewe, described Crewe-Milnes as "both extravagant and poorly advised".

=== Calmic, Wellcome and hotel ===
Early in the Second World War, Crewe Hall was used as a military training camp, repatriation camp for Dunkirk troops and a US army camp, becoming the gun operations headquarters for the north-west region in 1942. It housed a prisoner-of-war camp for German officers from 1943. The hall was leased as offices in 1946, becoming the headquarters of Calmic Limited (the company's name is an abbreviation of Cheshire and Lancashire Medical Industries Corporation), which moved from Lancashire to Crewe Hall in 1947. They eventually employed nearly 800 people at Crewe Hall. Calmic produced hygiene and medical products on the site including tablets, creams, analgesics and antibiotic aerosols; the company's brands included Calpol (launched in 1959 with the brand name likely a combination of 'Calmic' and 'paracetamol'). Calmic constructed industrial facilities adjacent to the hall including a drying and filtration plant and pharmaceutical packaging unit. After Wellcome's acquisition of Calmic in 1965, the hall served as the UK and Ireland headquarters of the Wellcome Foundation until the merger with Glaxo in 1995. Wellcome produced liquids, tablets, creams and antibiotic aerosols at the site; the hall itself was used for administration, but the stables block was rebuilt internally for use as laboratories and the industrial facilities were expanded.

In 1994, the Duchy of Lancaster sold the Crewe Hall buildings and the adjacent industrial site, which became Crewe Hall Enterprise Park. The Crewe Hall buildings remained empty after Wellcome moved out and were sold to a hotel developer in 1998; the hall became a 26-bedroom hotel the following year. Several additional buildings in a modern style were constructed in the 21st century to extend the accommodation.

== Architectural history ==
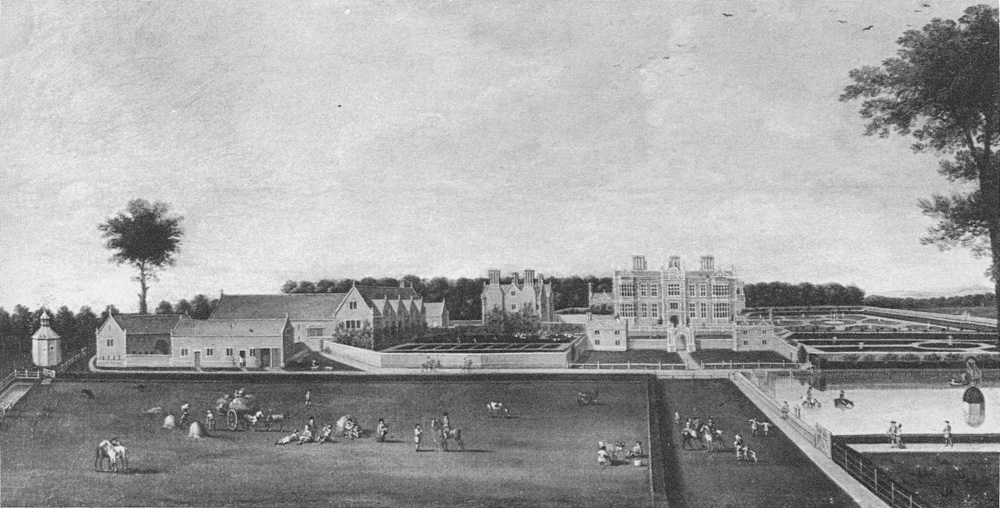
Crewe Hall from a painting of c. 1710

The Jacobean hall was built for Sir Randolph Crewe between 1615 and 1636. The architect of the original building is unknown, although some historians have concluded that its design was based on drawings by Inigo Jones. Although of a relatively conservative design, similar to that of Longleat from half a century earlier, the hall seems to have been considered progressive in provincial Cheshire. The historian Thomas Fuller wrote in 1662:

Sir Randal first brought the model of excellent building into these remoter parts; yea, brought London into Cheshire, in the loftiness, sightliness, and pleasantness of their structures.

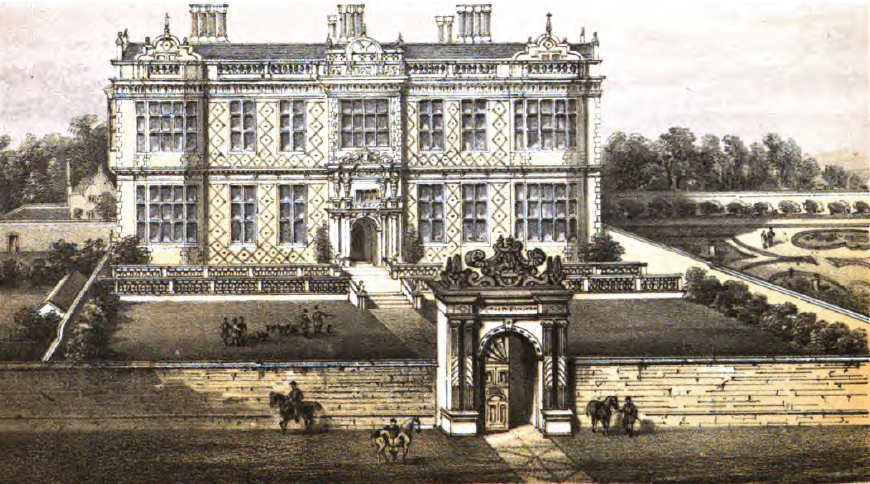
Crewe Hall from an early engraving

Hearth-tax assessments of 1674 show the original hall to have been one of the largest houses in Cheshire, its 42 hearths being surpassed only by Cholmondeley House and Rocksavage, neither of which have survived. As depicted in a painting of around 1710, the original building was square with sides of around 100 feet (30 m), and featured gabled projecting bays and groups of octagonal chimney stacks. Built around a central open courtyard, the interior had a great hall and long gallery; the main entrance led to a screens passage and the main staircase was in a small east hall. Externally, there was a walled forecourt and formal walled gardens; a range of separate service buildings was located to the west.

=== Georgian and Jacobethan alterations ===
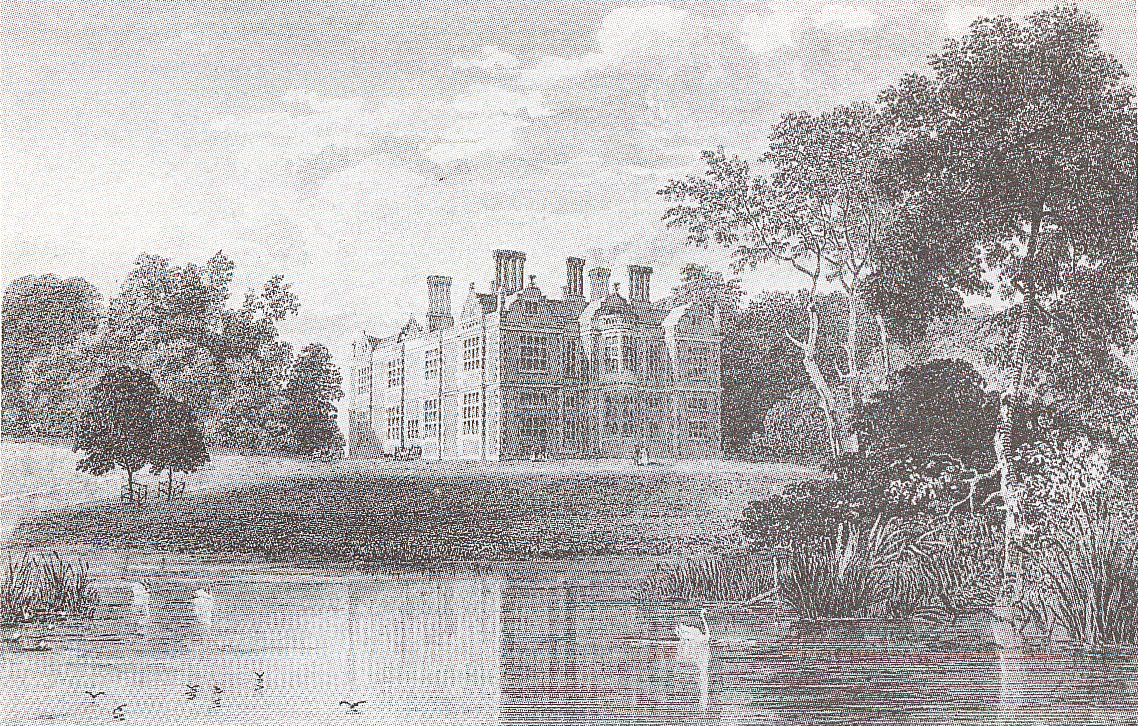
Garden front and lake, from an engraving of c. 1818

The house remained unaltered for much of the 18th century, in contrast to most of the other principal seats in the county. It was described in 1769 as "a square of very old date ... more to be admired now for its antiquity than elegance or conveniency." Work was carried out during the 1780s and '90s for John Crewe (later the first Baron Crewe). A service wing to the west in a Jacobean revival style was added to the hall in 1780. The principal interiors of the old building were redecorated in neo-Classical style at this time, although the original layout with great hall, long gallery and drawing room was retained. Improvements were made to the wine cellars and bedrooms in 1783, and J. Cheney was employed to build a new attic staircase and seven bedrooms in 1796. Edmund Burke wrote in 1788, "I am vastly pleased with this place. We build no such houses in our time." The second Lord Palmerston, visiting in the same year, wrote:

But now by taste and judgment plann'd,
Throughout these scenes we find
The work of Art's improving hand,
With ancient splendour join'd.

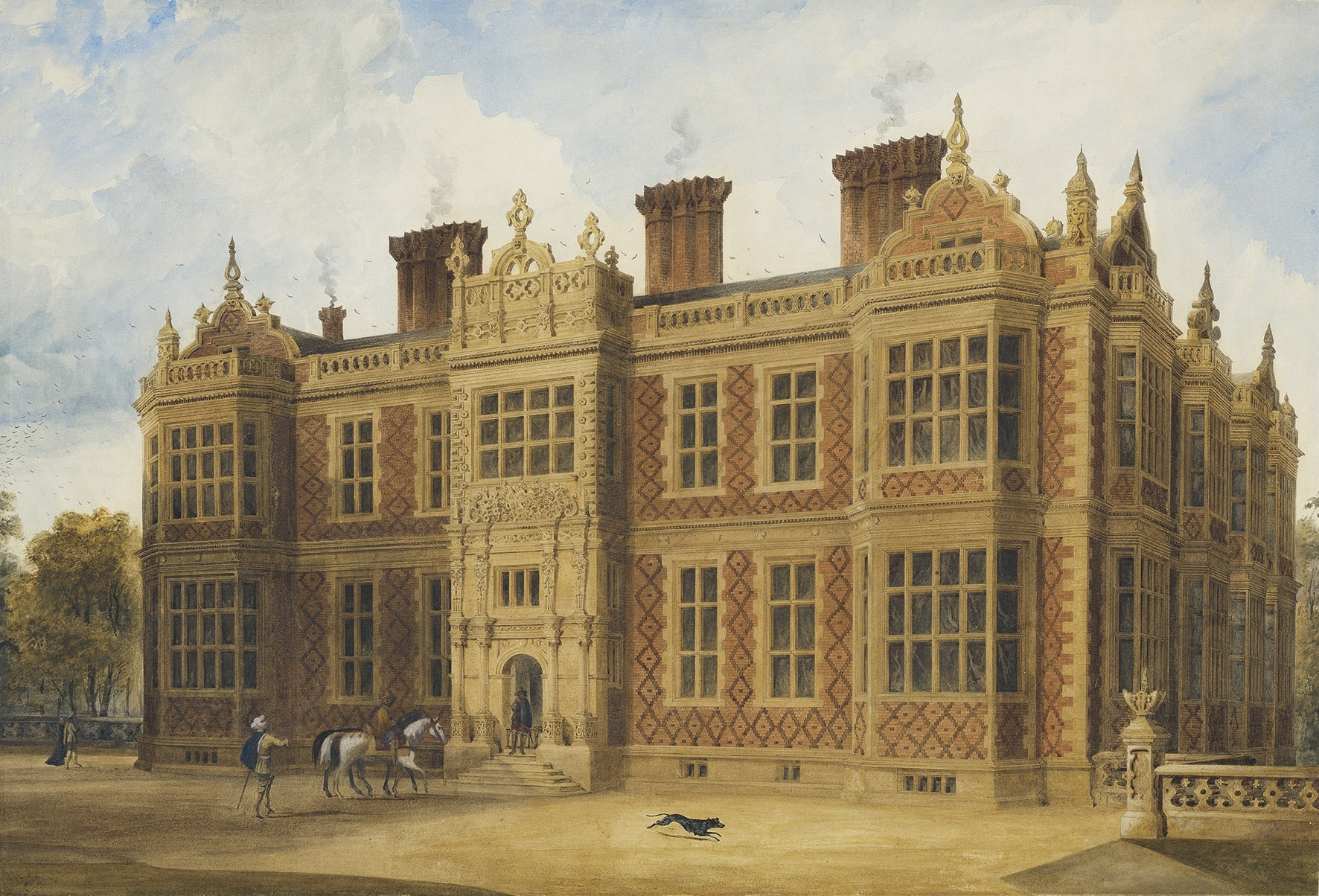
Crewe Hall in the mid-19th century

The house was altered again in 1837–42 by Edward Blore for Hungerford Crewe. Blore replaced a local architect, George Latham, who had been commissioned in 1836. Many of Blore's working drawings survive in the Royal Institute of British Architects archive. He carried out decorative work to the interior in the Jacobethan style and made major changes to the plan of the ground floor, which included replacing the screens passage with an entrance hall and covering the central courtyard to create a single-storey central hall. He also fitted plate glass windows throughout and installed a warm-air heating system. The total cost, including his work on estate buildings, was £30,000 (£3 million today).

=== E. M. Barry restoration ===
Most of Blore's work to the main hall was destroyed in the fire of 1866. Hungerford Crewe is said to have asked Blore, then retired, to restore the building, but he declined. The restoration work was instead carried out by E. M. Barry, son of Sir Charles Barry, the architect of the Palace of Westminster, and the contractors Cubitt & Co.; it was completed in 1870, at a cost of £150,000 (£15.4 million today). In a lecture to the Royal Academy, Barry later outlined his strategy for the restoration:

The greatest care has been taken to recover the design of Sir Randolph for such of the work as it has been possible to restore ... although with less roughness of execution and uncouthness of detail, particularly in respect of the human figure. Such peculiarities cannot, I think, be properly repeated in a modern reconstruction ... it is not the part of the 19th century restorer to reproduce matters which at best were the weaknesses of his predecessors. He ... should not seek, by a clever imitation of bygone tricks of construction or design, to deceive the spectator as to the age of his own work, and so pass off the latter as something which it is not.

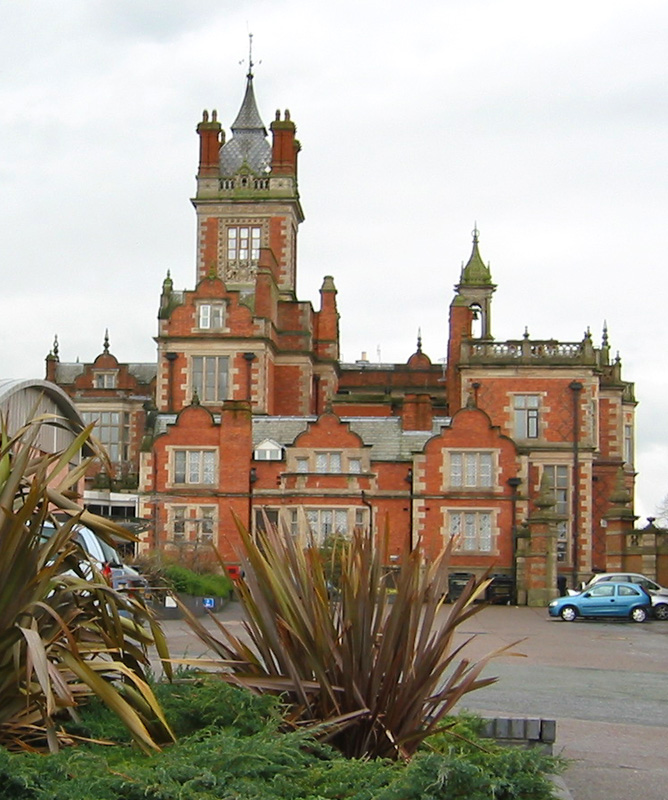
West face, showing Barry's tower and Bower's extension

Nikolaus Pevsner describes Barry's reconstruction as "an extremely sumptuous job." Peter de Figueiredo and Julian Treuherz consider it his finest work, attributing his success to being "directed by the powerful character of the existing building." Barry's work is considered to be, in general, more elaborate and more regular than the original. For the restoration of the interior, he employed several of the leading artists and craftsmen of the time, who had previously worked on the Palace of Westminster. Barry's principal innovation was the addition of a tower to the west wing, which was required for water storage. Intended to unite the east and west wings of the hall, the effect is limited by the tower's Victorian design. He also reorganised the plan of the building, opening up Blore's central hall to create a two-storey atrium, as well as providing more ground-floor service rooms and generating twenty extra servants' bedrooms in an attic by modifying the roof.

Local architect Thomas Bower performed some alterations to the house for Robert Crewe-Milnes in 1896, including extending the service wing. Few changes to the hall itself occurred during Calmic's tenancy. The company installed central heating in around 1948, and later constructed an office extension on the north side of the house, which was demolished a few years after the building's conversion into an hotel. Calmic had undertaken only cosmetic maintenance work, and by the 1970s the fabric of the building was in poor repair. A major stonework fall from the north gable during high winds in 1974 led Wellcome to carry out an extensive restoration programme to both the interior and the exterior, which was completed in 1979 at a cost of £500,000 (£2.5 million today).

== Main hall ==
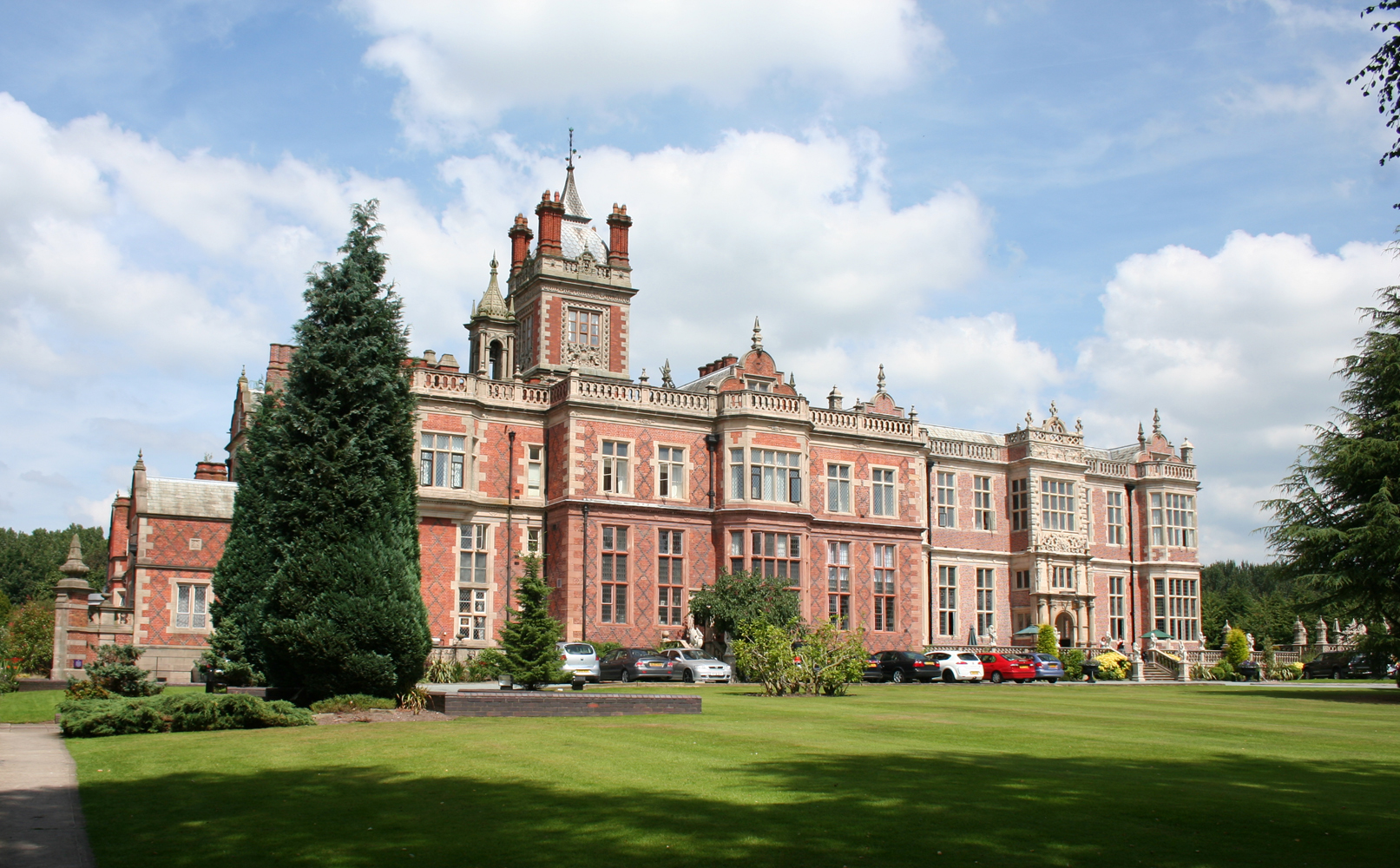
South face; the Jacobean (east) wing is on the right; the service (west) wing is centre and left

Crewe Hall is a grade-I-listed mansion located at SJ733540 in the civil parish of Crewe Green, ½ mile (1 km) from the edge of Crewe. The architecture historian Nikolaus Pevsner considered the main hall to be one of the two finest Jacobean houses in Cheshire, the other being Dorfold Hall at Acton. Constructed in red brick with stone dressings and a lead and slate roof, the hall has two storeys with attics and basements. The eastern half of the present building largely represents the original Jacobean hall. The exterior survived the fire of 1866 and the majority of the diapered brickwork is original, although some of the stonework of the porch and the tops of the gables was renewed by E. M. Barry.

The south (front) face of the eastern wing has seven bays, with a balustraded parapet at eaves level. The central bay is set forward to form a stone centrepiece around the arched main entrance, which is flanked by fluted Ionic columns. Immediately above the entrance are doubled tapering pilasters flanking a three-light window, all surmounted by a large cartouche decorated with strapwork. On the first floor of the central bay is a triple-mullion window, and above the parapet is a coat of arms. Flanking the centrepiece are two bays with diapered brickwork and single-mullion windows. The two ends of the south face are also set forward; they have canted, triple-mullion bay windows and are surmounted above the parapet by shaped gables with attic windows. All the main windows of this face are double transomed.

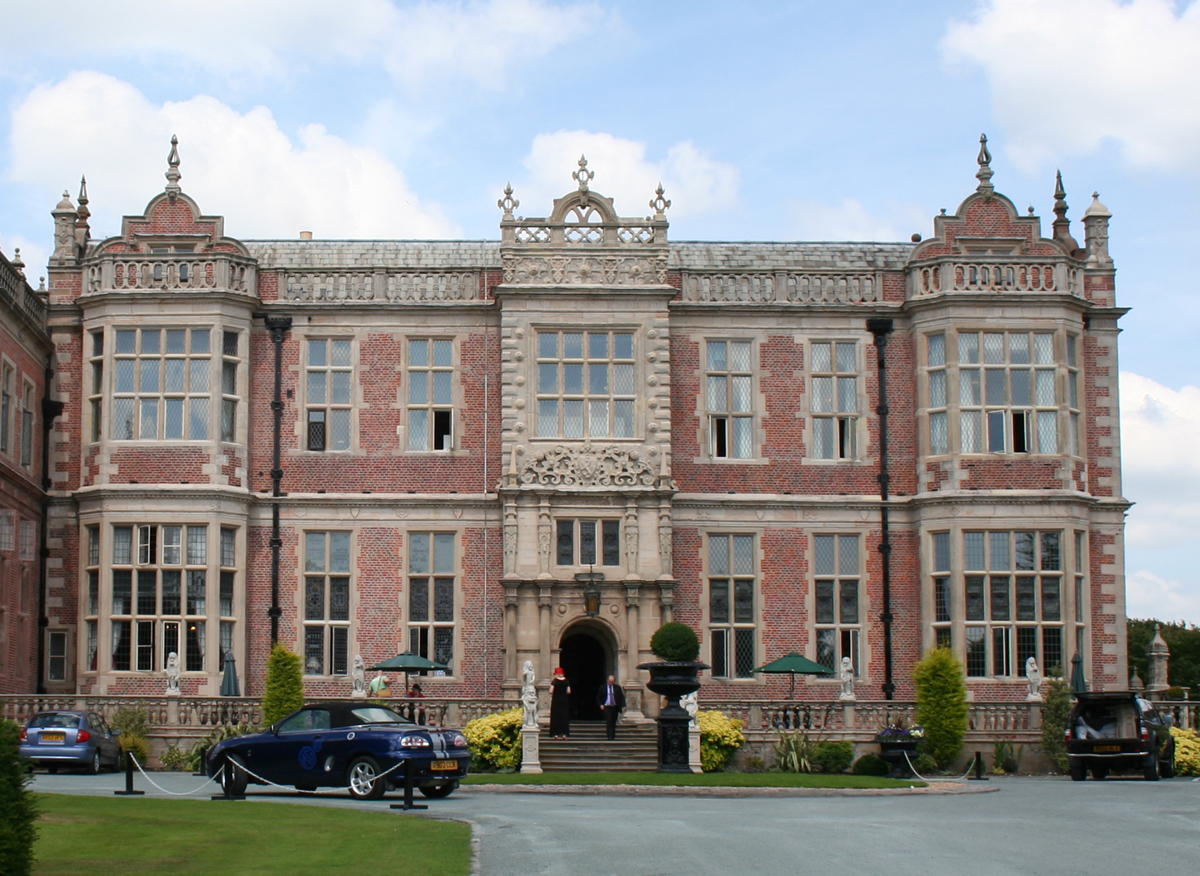
East wing: south face, showing centrepiece

The east face of the eastern wing has four bays with canted bay windows, shaped end gables and a central cartouche. In the centre of the northern (garden) face is a large bow window, originally Jacobean, which illuminates the chapel; it has stone panels decorated with cartouches below arched stained glass lights. This face otherwise reverses the main façade, with the addition of mezzanine windows.

The western half of the building is stepped forward (southwards) by two bays from the original building. Originally the service wing, it is plainer than the eastern building and dates from the Georgian era. Though using Georgian proportions, it was built in an early Jacobean revival style which has been heightened by subsequent alterations, particularly the addition of a central gable. The main part of the south (front) face has seven bays, with a balustraded parapet running along the entire façade at eaves level. In the centre of the five east bays is a canted bay window beneath a shaped gable; the flanking bays have single-mullion, double-transomed windows. The two west bays are set backwards and have a central oriel window on the first floor with two single-mullion, double-transomed windows on the ground floor.

The western wing is dominated by a square tower of stone-dressed brick which rises two storeys above the roof and is capped by an ogee spirelet surrounded by four corner chimneys. Designed by Barry in the High Victorian style, it was added after the fire. A slender bell tower also rises from the west wing. At the rear is a loggia with a vaulted ceiling supported by Tuscan columns. The western end of this wing is a single-storey extension by Thomas Bower dating from 1896.

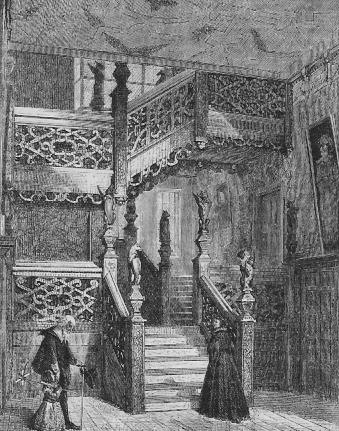
Staircase in 1877

=== Interior ===
The interior of Crewe Hall contains a mixture of original Jacobean work, faithful reproductions of the original Jacobean designs (which in some cases had been recorded), and work in the High Victorian style designed by Barry. The entrance hall in the east wing was remodelled by both Edward Blore and Barry. It is panelled in oak and contains a marble chimneypiece with Tuscan columns featuring the Crewe arms. It opens via a columned screen into the central hall, which was an open courtyard in the Jacobean house. Roofed by Blore at the first-floor level, Barry converted the space into an atrium featuring cloisters around the walls, with a wooden gallery over them at the mezzanine level and a tunnel-vaulted first-floor gallery above. The floor is paved with a pattern of coloured marbles and the first-floor gallery corridors have stained glass panels. The atrium has a hammerbeam roof supported by columns at the gallery level. To the east of the central hall is an accurate reconstruction by Barry of the original staircase, which Nikolaus Pevsner described as "one of the most ingeniously planned and ornately executed in the whole of Jacobean England." Heavily carved, the newels feature heraldic animals, which were originally gilded and painted.

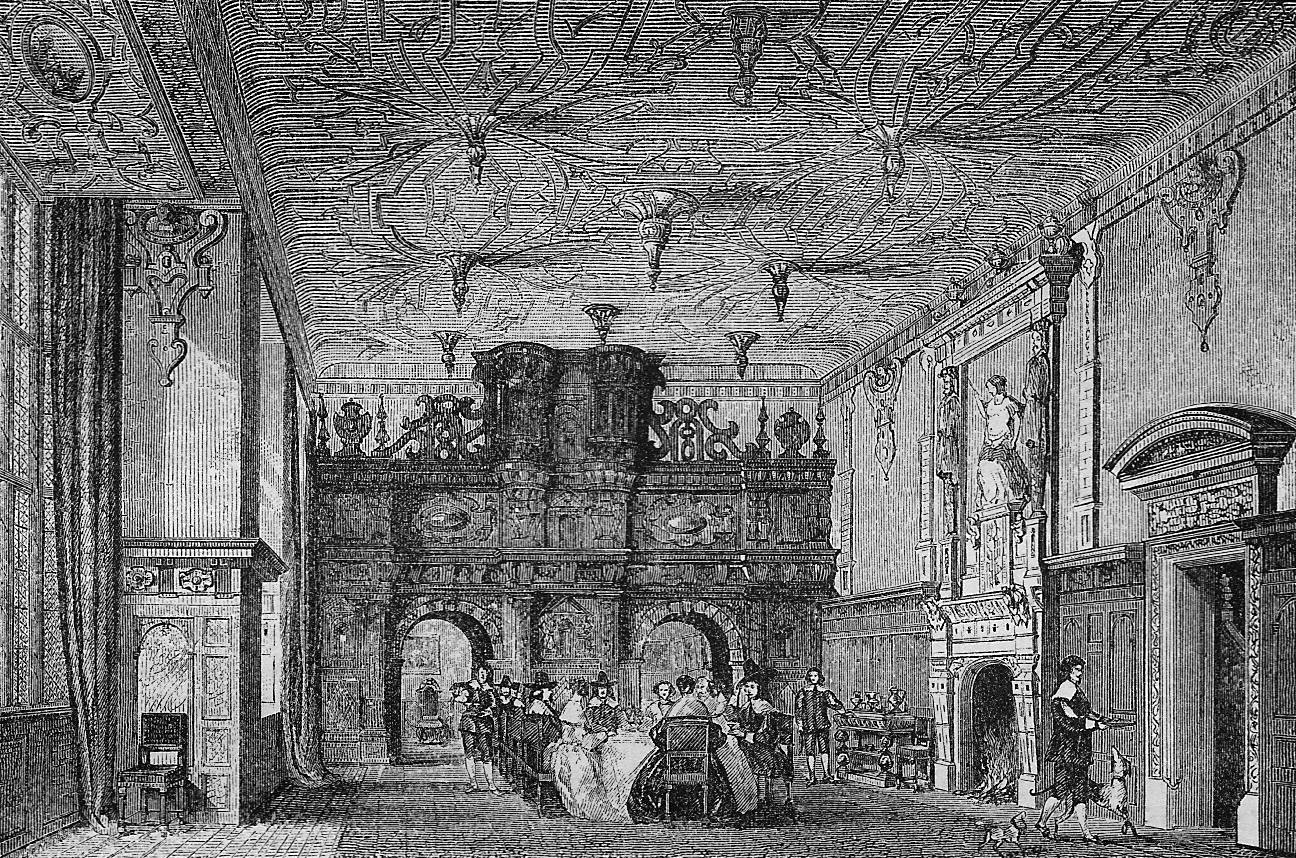
Dining Room in 1877

To the east of the entrance lies the dining room, which was formerly the Jacobean great hall. The room least damaged by the fire, it was restored by Barry to its 17th-century appearance, with facsimiles of the original ceiling and carved wooden screen. It contains an overmantel featuring a relief of Plenty, considered to be original, and a large stone chimneypiece, which is believed to be the only surviving work by Blore on the interior. The oak parlour, in the south west, contains a large wooden Jacobean overmantel, featuring Green Men carving. The Jacobean carving here and in the dining room is noticeably cruder than the Victorian work. The carved parlour is another reproduction by Barry of the original. Panelled in oak, it has a plaster frieze of the Elements, Graces and Virtues. The alabaster chimneypiece depicts the winged figure of Time rewarding Industry and punishing Sloth, symbolised by two boys, which is surmounted by a carved portrait of Sir Randolph Crewe.

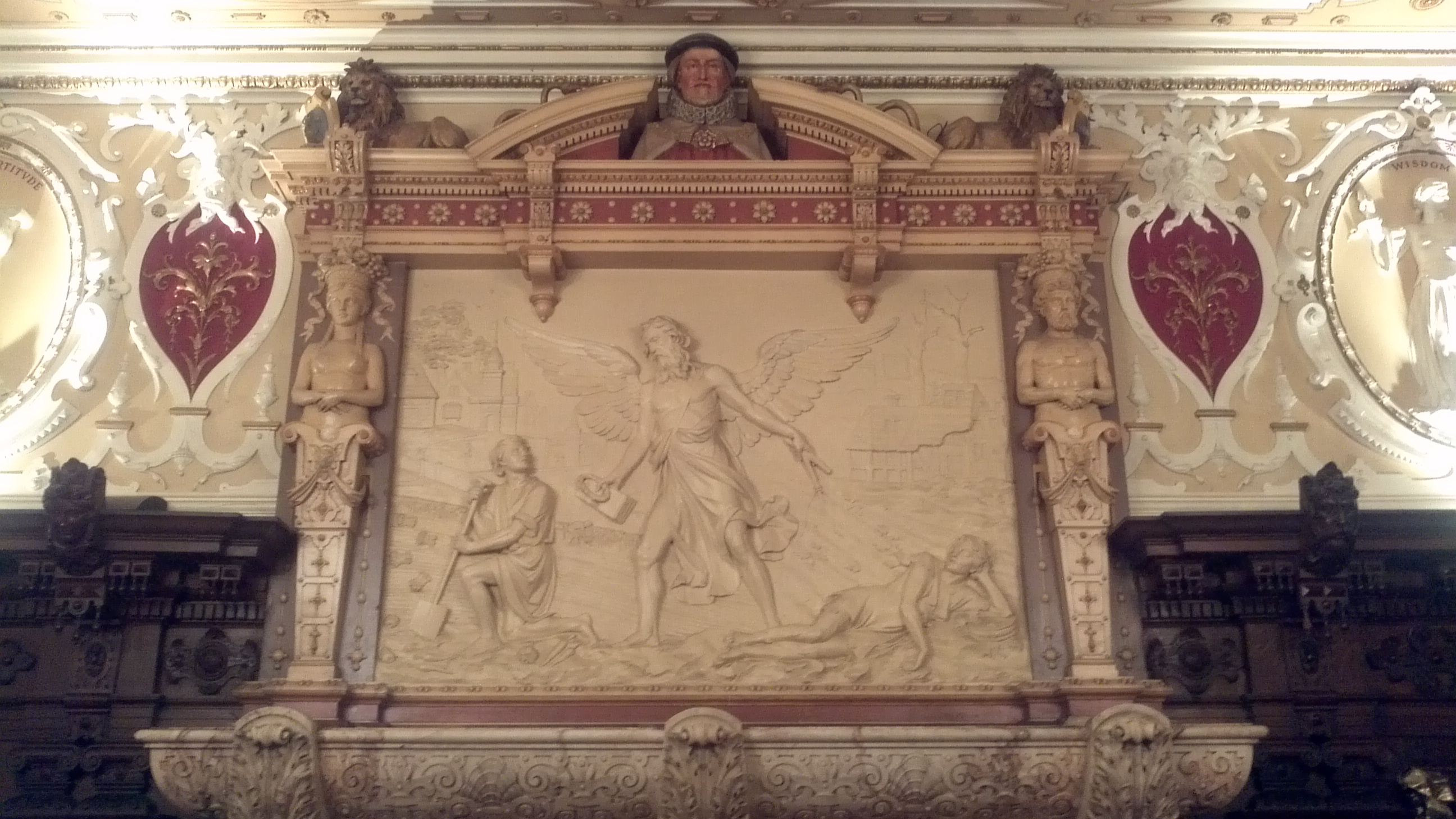
Sir Randolph Crewe overlooking Time, Industry and Sloth

A small chapel lies to the north of the central hall. Originally rather austere, it was lavishly decorated by Barry in the High Victorian style. There is much elaborate wood carving, with the altar rail featuring angels and the benches poppyheads. The marble apse has alabaster carved heads of the prophets and evangelists by J. Birnie Philip, and the wall panelling features bronze medallions depicting biblical characters by the same artist. The ornate choir gallery, reached from the central hall's mezzanine gallery, contains the family pew. The stained glass and wall murals are by Clayton and Bell, and the painting and stencilling are by J. G. Crace.

The suite of state rooms on the first floor of the east wing contains the long gallery, library, drawing room (great chamber), small drawing room and two bedrooms. All date originally from the Jacobean mansion, but are likely to have been significantly altered by John Crewe and then extensively reworked by Blore in neo-Jacobean style. They were restored to Barry's designs, usually with little attempt to reproduce the Jacobean appearance, probably because records of most of the original designs were lacking. Crace performed much of the decoration work in these rooms. All the state rooms contain elaborate plasterwork and stone chimneypieces, often flanked with Corinthian columns or pilasters.

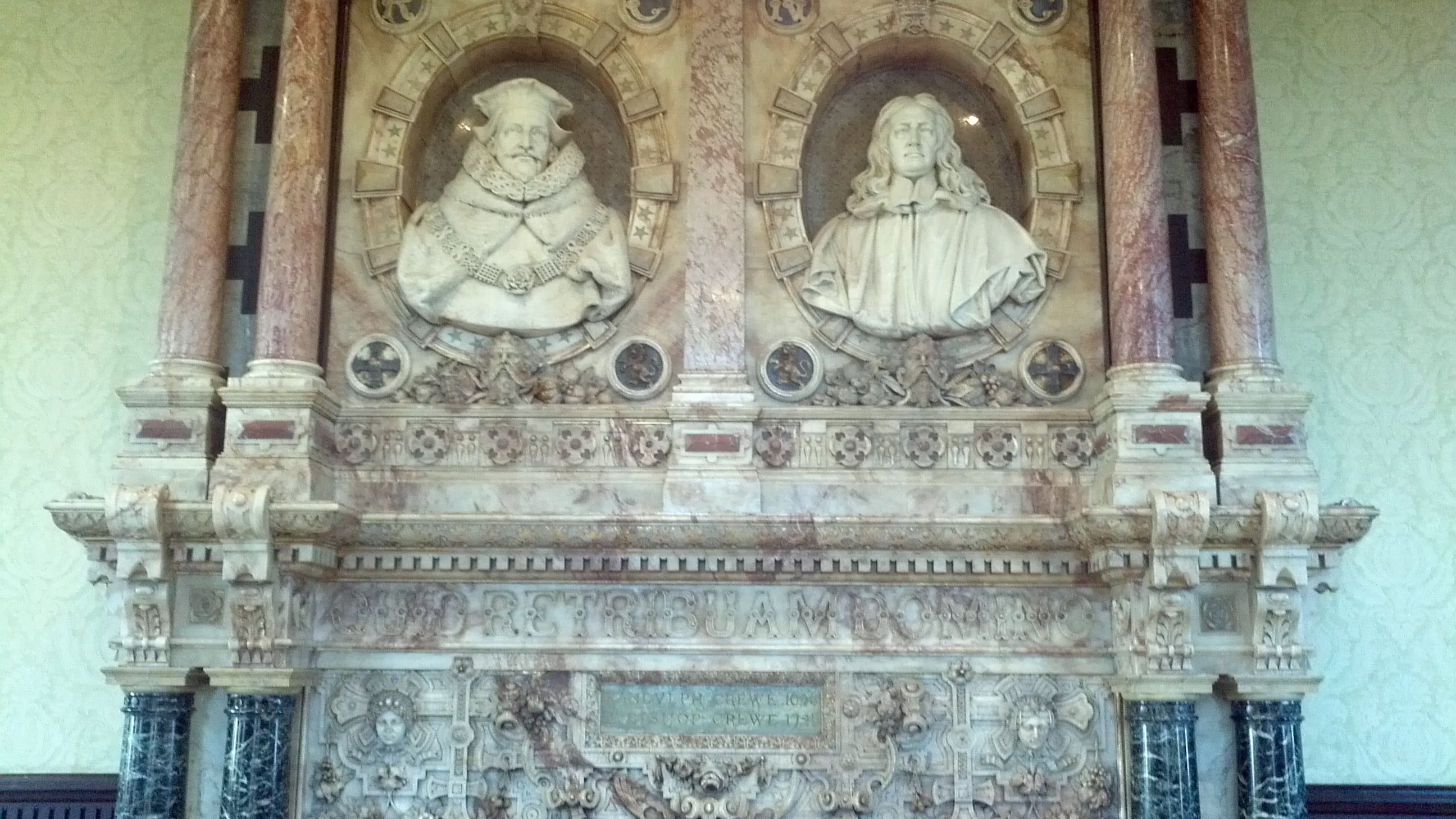
Busts of Sir Randolph Crewe and Nathaniel Crew

The long gallery, along the north side, has a chimneypiece in coloured marbles with busts by Henry Weekes depicting Sir Randolph Crewe and Nathaniel Crew, 3rd Baron Crew, Bishop of Durham. The library, above the carved parlour, contains statuettes of book lovers by Philip and a frieze of scenes from literature by J. Mabey. The drawing room has a facsimile of the Jacobean ceiling, which had been recorded by architect William Burn. Identical in pattern to one at the Reindeer Inn in Banbury, of which the Victoria and Albert Museum has a plaster cast, it was presumably originally the work of the same craftsman. One of the state bedrooms has another survivor of the fire, a Jacobean stone fireplace with a plaster overmantel relief depicting Cain and Abel.

== Stables, outbuildings and gate lodges ==
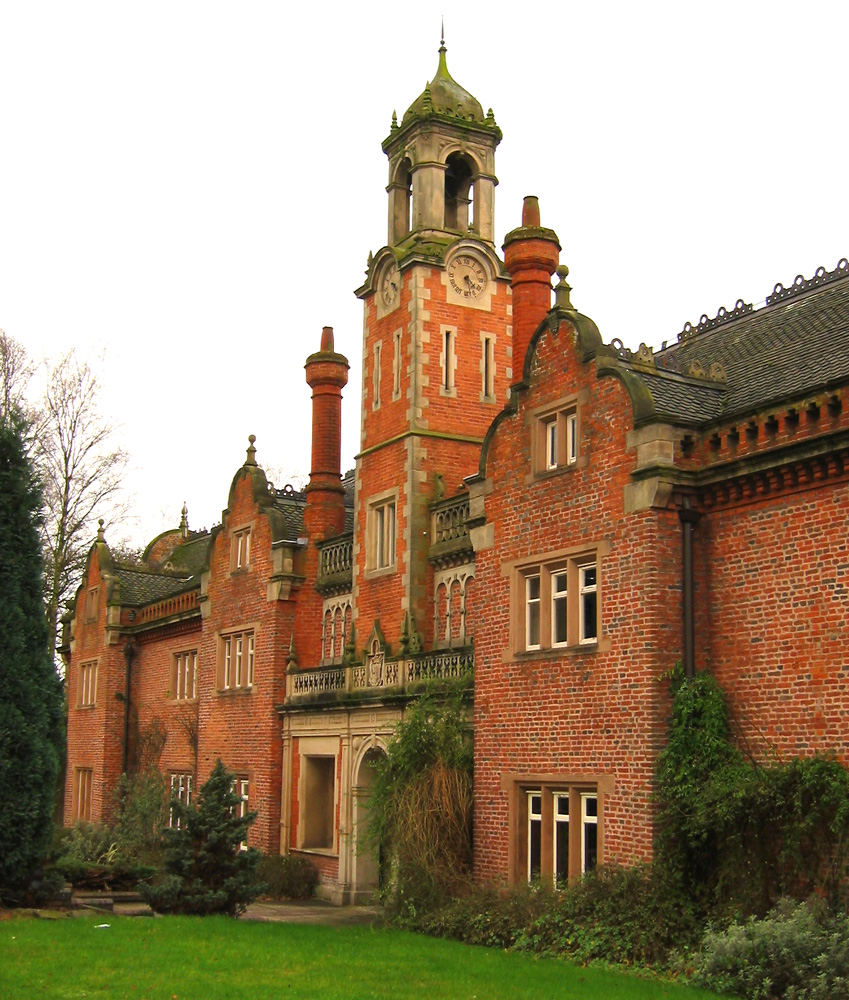
East face of the stable block, showing Blore's centrepiece

The former stables, in red brick with a tiled roof, were completed around 1636 and are contemporary with the Jacobean mansion; they are listed at grade II*. They form a quadrangle immediately to the west of the hall, enclosing a rectangular courtyard. The main east face of the quadrangle stands at right angles to the front of the house; it has nine bays of two storeys and an attic. Its centrepiece, added by Edward Blore in around 1837, consists of an arched stone entrance flanked by pilasters, above which a clock tower rises from the first-floor level. The tower features twinned arrow-slit windows and clock faces with stone surrounds, and is topped by a bell chamber and ogee cupola with finials. In addition to the centrepiece, the east face has four bays which are set forward and have shaped gables topped with finials. The north and south ends of this east building also have shaped gables.

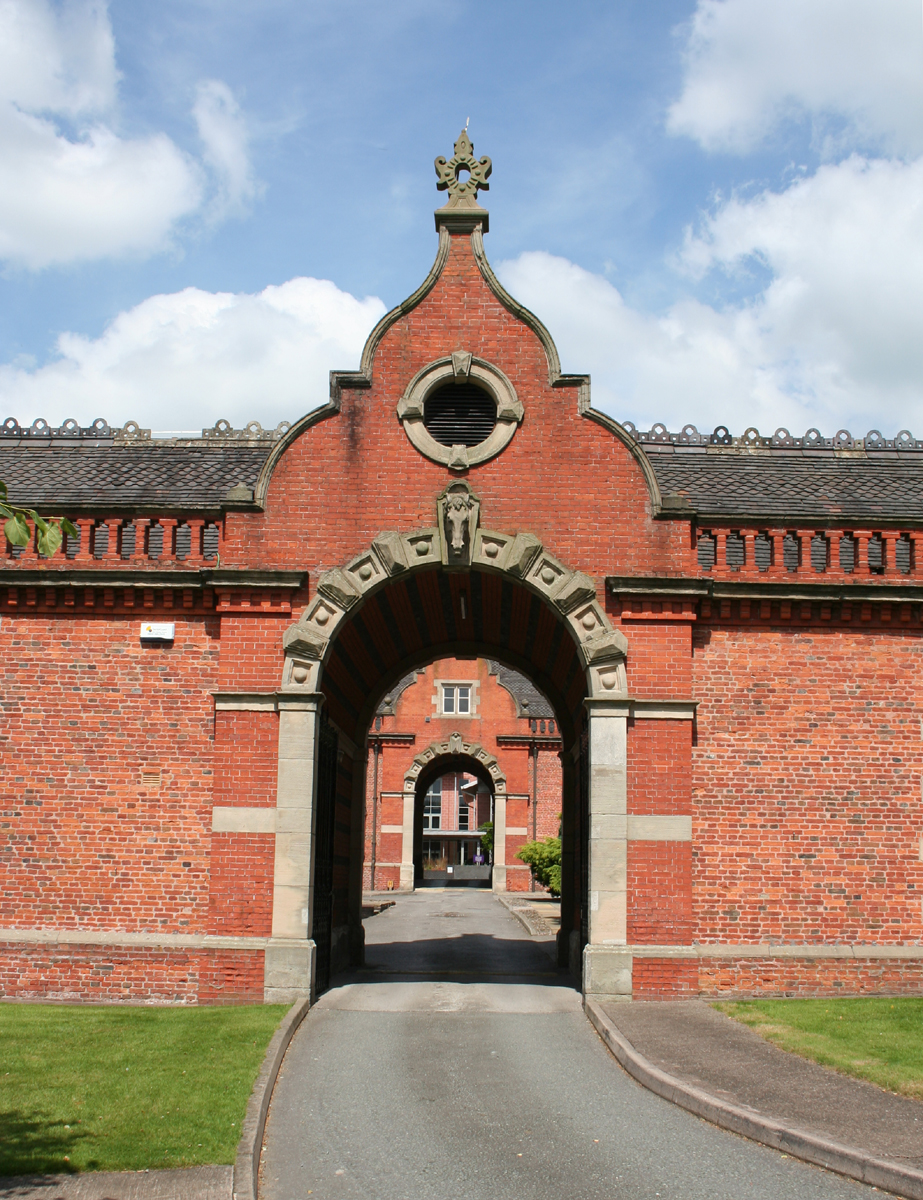
Carriage archway

The north and south sides of the quadrangle have large arched carriage openings beneath shaped gables; the keystones are carved with horse's heads. The walls within the carriageway opening are decorated with bands of blue brick. The east, north and south faces are all finished with an openwork brick parapet with a stone coping. The west building has twelve arched openings accessed from the courtyard. The main storeys of the quadrangle mainly have three-light, stone-dressed mullion windows, with two-light windows at the attic level. All the roofs have tall octagonal chimneys and feature decorative ridge tiles. The interior of the stables block was rebuilt during the building's conversion to its present use of laboratories and offices.

The Apple House, a small red-brick building to the west of the stables quadrangle, also dates from around 1636, and can be seen in a painting of Crewe Hall from around 1710. Originally a dovecote, it is used as a storehouse. Built on an octagonal plan with two storeys, it has two oval windows with stone surrounds. The lower entrance has a stone semicircular arch; a second doorway is located at first-floor height. The pyramidal tiled roof is topped by a glazed lantern with a lead cap. The building is listed at grade II.

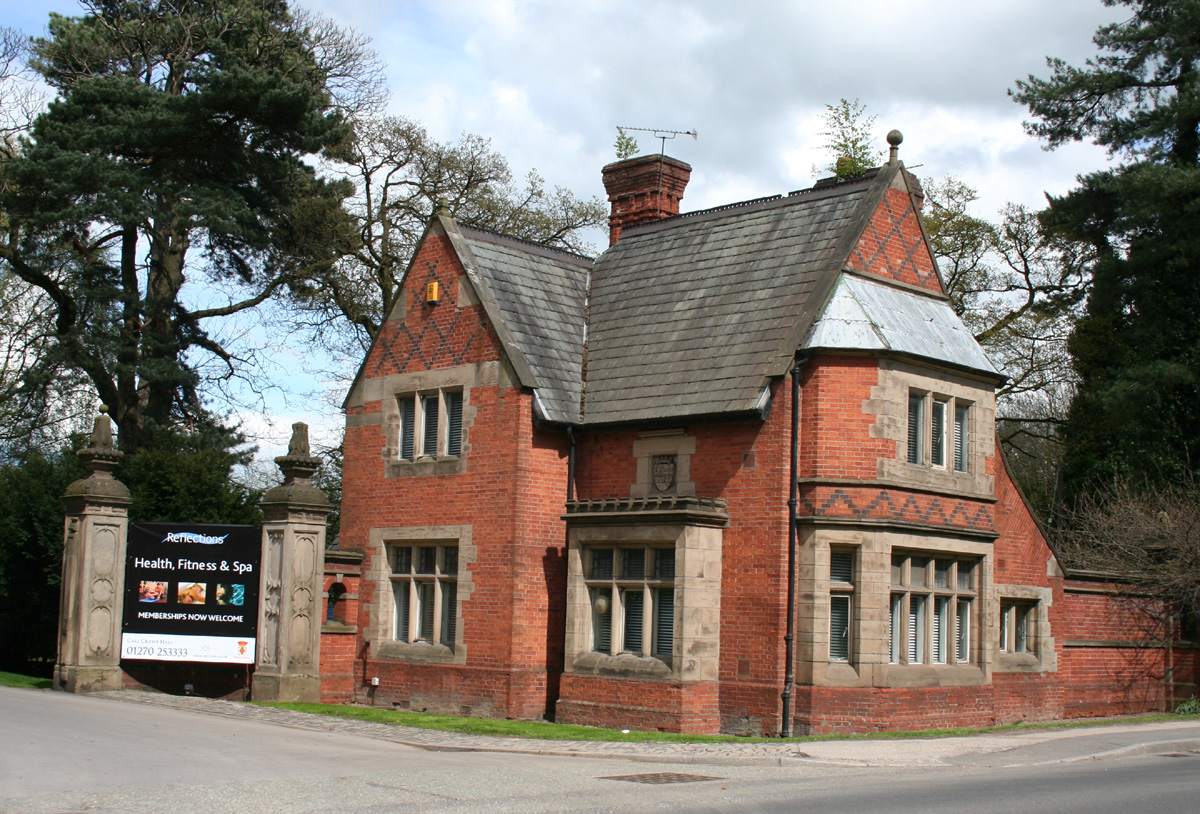
Weston Lodge

The park has two gate lodges; both are listed at grade II. The northern lodge at Slaughter Hill is by Blore and dates from 1847. In red brick with darker-brick diapering, stone dressings and a slate roof, it has a T-shaped plan with a single storey, and is Jacobean in style. It features two shaped gables, each decorated with a panel carved with Crewe Estate emblems, and a hexagonal central bay with a pyramidal roof which forms a porch. The Elizabethan-style Weston or Golden Gates Lodge to the south of the house dates from before 1865 and is attributed to William Eden Nesfield, although it is not typical of his style. In red brick with blue-brick zig–zag diapering, ashlar dressings and a slate roof, the lodge has two storeys, with a projecting canted bay to the road face. The driveway face has an ashlar panel with a shield bearing the Crewe family coat of arms.

== Gardens and park ==
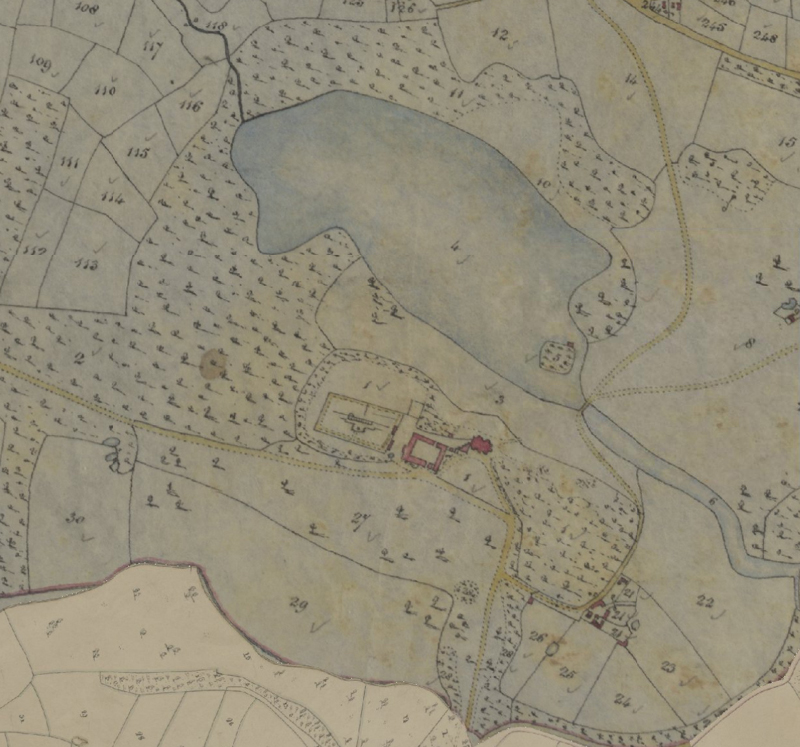
Part of the park in 1840, showing Repton's ornamental lake

The National Register of Historic Parks and Gardens lists 497 acres (201 ha) of the gardens and surrounding parkland at grade II. An early engraving shows a walled forecourt to the south of the original hall, with a large stone gateway carved with Sir Randolph Crewe's arms and motto. The forecourt had terraces, balustrades and a path decorated with diamond patterns. As depicted in a painting of around 1710, the grounds were laid out in extensive formal walled pleasure gardens with parterres.

During the 18th century, the park was landscaped in a more naturalistic style for John Crewe (later the first Baron Crewe) by Lancelot Brown (before 1768), William Emes (1768–71), and Humphry Repton and John Webb (1791). Repton's design included an ornamental lake of 23 hectares (57 acres) immediately north of the house, created by damming Engelsea Brook, which still runs through the park. He also created new approaches to the house. The lake drained away in 1941 when a dam burst, and the area is now planted with poplars. A stone statue of Neptune with a reclining female, originally located on the banks of the lake, now stands in woodland; it dates from the early 19th century. A boathouse, originally at the head of the lake, was in need of restoration in 2007. A Temple of Peace formerly stood on the north shore of the lake, but was demolished some time after 1892. Much of the parkland is now covered with mixed woodland, including Rookery Wood and Temple of Peace Wood.

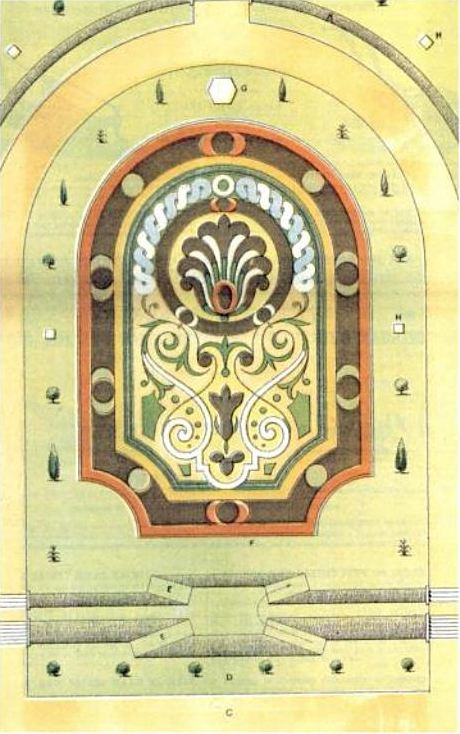
W. A. Nesfield's plan for the north parterre

Formal gardens were laid out around the house by W. A. Nesfield in around 1840–50 for Hungerford Crewe. Nesfield's design included statuary, gravelled walks and elaborate parterres realised using low box hedges and coloured minerals. Balustraded terraces were also constructed on the north and south sides of the hall, probably designed by E. M. Barry, and incorporating statues of lions, griffins and other heraldic beasts, echoing the interior staircase. Military usage during the Second World War, however, destroyed parts of the gardens; army buildings were erected near the house, and the area in front of the hall served as a parade ground and later was ploughed up to grow potatoes. The grounds were further neglected while the house was used as offices, and little has survived except the terraces, gates and statues. In 2009, English Heritage placed the hall on the Heritage at Risk Register as highly vulnerable, considering that the historic character of the gardens and park is compromised by recent developments to the hotel complex, in particular the conference centre, spa and associated parking area.

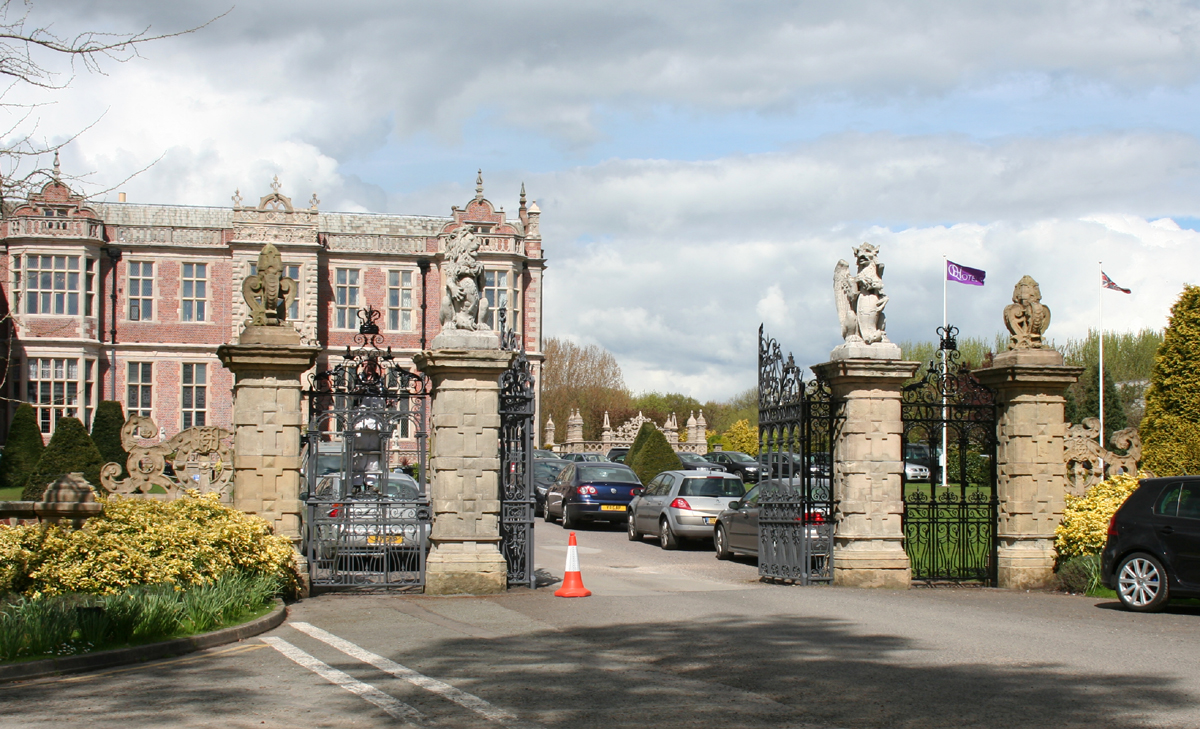
Entrance gates by Cubitt & Co.

The entrance gates and wall separating the gardens from the park and farmland date from 1878 and are listed at grade II. The wrought-iron gates are by Cubitt & Co., and were exhibited at the Paris Exhibition of 1878. Two outer single gates and a double inner gate are supported by four sandstone piers. The outer pair of gate piers are capped by a bud-shaped device supported on scrolls; the inner pair are surmounted by a griffin and a lion, mirroring the statuary of the hall's terraces. The lower gate sections of lyre-like panels with leaf and spearhead motifs are topped with Jacobean-style arched panels. The ornate gate overthrows include shields and emblems capped with crowns, sheaves and sickles. The inner gates bear the inscription Quid retribuam domino ("What can I render to the Lord?"), while the outer gates bear the date. The wall, of brick with stone dressings, features arcading and has piers surmounted with ogee caps carved to match the tiles of the main hall tower. A further feature of the gardens to survive is a grade-II-listed sundial dating from the early 19th century, which stands to the rear of the house.

== Crewe estate ==
=== History ===
The original estate purchased by Sir Randolph Crewe in 1608 included the manors of Crewe, Barthomley and Haslington and cost over £6,000. Lands from the Offley estate in Staffordshire and the Done estate in Cheshire were acquired by marriage and inheritance in the late 17th and early 18th centuries, and in common with the other great Cheshire estates, the estate flourished during the 18th century. The estate of 1804 included land or property in Barthomley, Burwardsley, Crewe, Crowton, Elton, Hale, Northrode, Rushton, Sandbach, Spurstow, Tattenhall, Warmingham and Weston in Cheshire, as well as Madeley in Staffordshire and Muxton in Shropshire. The predominant land use was dairy farming, but the estate also included some arable land; tenancies ranged from crofts of 1 or 2 acres (less than a hectare) to large farms of over 300 acres (120 ha). The gardens, park and home farm occupied 583 acres (236 ha). Hungerford Crewe was the fifth greatest landowner in the county in 1871, with a total of 10,148 acres (4,107 ha). The majority of the Crewe estate was sold by Robert Crewe-Milnes to the Duchy of Lancaster in 1936.

=== Estate buildings ===
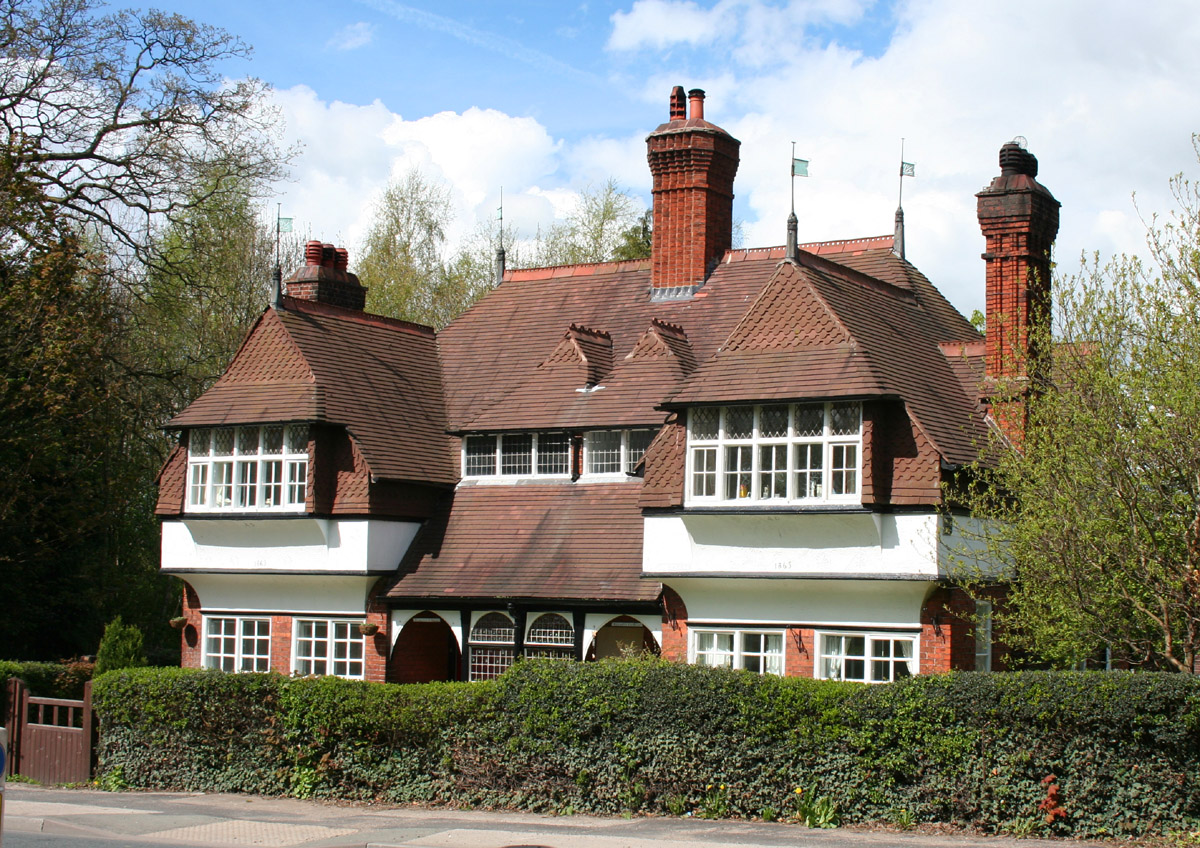
Stowford and Magnolia Cottages

Crewe Hall Farmhouse, the estate's home farm, stands on the edge of the grounds, ¼ mile to the south east of the hall; it dates from around 1702 and is listed at grade II. In brown brick with a slate roof, it has two storeys and five bays to the front. Two of the adjacent farm buildings, dating from 1883 to 1884, are also listed. As of 2009, the Duchy of Lancaster is developing outbuildings at Crewe Hall Farm, including the two listed buildings, into leasehold offices totalling 27,850 square feet (2,590 m^{2}).

Several estate cottages near Weston Lodge were designed by W. E. Nesfield between 1860 and 1866, and are among his earliest works. They include Stowford and Magnolia Cottages (1864–65), which Nikolaus Pevsner describes as "cheerful and just a little Kate Greenaway", Smithy Cottage (around 1865) and Fir Tree Cottage (1865), all listed at grade II, as well as a half-timbered farmhouse on Weston Road. Rather than either the Jacobean mansion or its High Victorian interiors, their style derives from buildings of the Home Counties, with tile hanging, incised pargetting, half-hipped gables and high chimneys. Pevsner credits Nesfield with introducing these features to Cheshire.

== Modern hotel and Crewe estate ==
As of 2025, Crewe Hall is a hotel in the QHotels group, set in 8 acres (3.2 ha) of parkland, with a restaurant, brasserie, conference facilities, tennis courts and health club, including a gym, spa and swimming pool. There are 117 bedrooms, of which 26 are located in the old building. The hall is licensed for civil wedding ceremonies. The hall and park are not otherwise open to the public. The Duchy of Lancaster retains ownership of a large area of the Crewe estate, which is mainly managed as dairy farms and woodland, with some commercial development near Crewe and at Crewe Hall Farm.

== See also ==
- Grade I listed buildings in Cheshire East
- Listed buildings in Crewe Green

== Notes and references ==
=== Sources ===
- Allen, Michael, ed. (2006). An English Lady in Paris: The Diary of Frances Anne Crewe 1786 (St Leonards: Oxford-Stockley) (ISBN 0-9552490-0-7) and (ISBN 978-0-9552490-2-0 pbk edition, 2011)
- Bisgrove, Richard (2008). William Robinson: The Wild Gardener (London: Frances Lincoln) (ISBN 0-7112-2542-7)
- Chambers, Susan (2007). Crewe – A History (Chichester: Phillimore) (ISBN 978-1-86077-472-0)
- Crosby, Alan (1996). A History of Cheshire (Chichester: Phillimore) (ISBN 0-85033-932-4)
- Cruickshanks, Eveline; Handley, Stuart & Hayton, D.W. (2002). The House of Commons, 1690–1715 (Volume V) (Cambridge: Cambridge University Press) (ISBN 0-521-77221-4)
- Curran, Howard; Gilsenan, Michael; Owen, Bernard & Owen, Joy (1984). Change at Crewe (Chester: Cheshire Libraries) (ISBN 0-904532-08-9)
- de Figueiredo, Peter & Treuherz, Julian (1988). Cheshire Country Houses (Chichester: Phillimore) (ISBN 0-85033-655-4)
- Dore, R.N. (1966) The Civil Wars in Cheshire (A History of Cheshire, Vol. 8; series editor: J.J. Bagley) (Chester: Cheshire Community Council)
- Fuller, Thomas (1840). The History of the Worthies of England (Vol. 1) (London: Thomas Tegg), retrieved on 11 March 2008
- Gladden, Ray (2005). Calmic at Crewe Hall (Crewe: Medica Packaging)
- Hinchliffe, Edward (1856). Barthomley: In Letters from a Former Rector to his Eldest Son (London: Longman, Brown, Green, and Longmans), retrieved on 25 January 2009
- Hodson, J. Howard (1978). Cheshire, 1660–1780: Restoration to Industrial Revolution (A History of Cheshire, Vol. 9; series editor: J.J. Bagley) (Chester: Cheshire Community Council) (ISBN 0-903119-10-2)
- Moss, Fletcher (1910). The Fifth Book of Pilgrimages to Old Homes (Didsbury: F. Moss)
- Pevsner, Nikolaus & Hubbard, Edward (1971). The Buildings of England: Cheshire (Harmondsworth: Penguin Books) (ISBN 0-14-071042-6)
- Ollerhead, Peter (2008). Crewe: History and Guide (Stroud: The History Press) (ISBN 978-0-7524-4654-7)
- Robinson, John Martin (1991). A Guide to the Country Houses of the North-West (London: Constable) (ISBN 0-09-469920-8)
- Scard, Geoffrey (1981). Squire and Tenant: Life in Rural Cheshire, 1760–1900 (A History of Cheshire, Vol. 10; series editor: J.J. Bagley) (Chester: Cheshire Community Council) (ISBN 0-903119-12-9)
- Tigwell, Rosalind E. (1985). Cheshire in the Twentieth Century (A History of Cheshire, Vol. 12; series editor: J.J. Bagley) (Chester: Cheshire Community Council) (ISBN 0-903119-15-3)
- Urban, Sylvanus (1866). Crewe Hall, with an illustration. The Gentleman's Magazine, NS I: 308–317, retrieved on 18 January 2009
