= Listed buildings in Crewe Green =

Crewe Green is a former civil parish in Cheshire East, England. It contained 22 buildings that are recorded in the National Heritage List for England as designated listed buildings. Of these, one is listed at Grade I, the highest grade, two are listed at Grade II*, the middle grade, and the others are at Grade II. The major feature in the parish is Crewe Hall and its surrounding estate. Otherwise, apart from the village of Crewe Green, the parish was rural. Crewe Hall itself and many of the structures associated with it are listed. Otherwise, the listed buildings consist of houses and cottages, a church, a church hall and a milepost.

== Key ==
Grade	Criteria
I	Buildings of exceptional interest, sometimes considered to be internationally important
II*	Particularly important buildings of more than special interest
II	Buildings of national importance and special interest

== Buildings ==
Name and location	Photograph	Date	Notes	Grade
Crewe Hall; 53.08271°N 2.39992°W		1615–36	A mansion in Jacobean style built for Sir Ranulph Crewe, it was extended in about 1800, and restored between 1830 and 1840 by Edward Blore. Following a fire in 1866, it was further restored by E. M. Barry. It has been converted into a hotel. The building is in brick with stone dressings, and has roofs of slate and lead. It is in two storeys with an attic and a basement. Its features include an arched entrance flanked by pairs of Ionic columns, a balustrade with finials, and a tower with an ogee roof and corner pinnacles.	I
Bridgehouse Farmhouse; 53.08057°N 2.37277°W	—	Early 17th century	The farmhouse was remodelled in 1875 by the Crewe Estate. It is in roughcast brick with a roof of shaped tiles. The house has an L-shaped plan, is in two storeys with an attic, and has a three-bay front. There is a projecting gabled porch with an arched entrance containing the Crewe Estate emblem and the date. Above this is a carved bargeboard and a finial. There are two gabled dormers, and the windows are casements.	II
Former stables, Crewe Hall; 53.08251°N 2.40093°W		c. 1636	The former stable block forms a quadrangle, and has since been converted for other uses. It is built in brick with tiled roofs. The main entrance is in the east range; this is in two storeys with an attic, and has a front of nine bays. Its centrepiece is an addition by Edward Blore that contains an arched opening and a clock tower with a bell chamber, surmounted by an ogee cupola with corner finials.	II*
The Apple House; 53.08259°N 2.40229°W	—	c. 1636	An octagonal store house in brick with diapering and a tiled roof. It is in two storeys, with a door in both storeys, and two windows in the upper storey. It has an octagonal pyramidal roof topped by a lantern.	II
Bluebell Cottage; 53.09424°N 2.40840°W	—	Late 17th century	A brick cottage with some timber-framing and a tiled roof. It is in two storeys with a two-bay front, and there is a single-bay extension to the left. The windows are casements, the single window in the upper storey being in a gabled half-dormer with bargeboards.	II
Lobelia Cottage; 53.09424°N 2.40825°W	—	Late 17th century	A timber-framed cottage with rendered brick nogging and a tiled roof. It is in two storeys with a three-bay front. The windows are casements, those in the upper storey being in gabled half-dormers with bargeboards. On the right side is a single-storey lean-to extension.	II
Crewe Hall Farmhouse; 53.07972°N 2.39631°W	—	c. 1702	The farmhouse is in brick with a tiled roof. It has a double-pile plan, is in two storeys with an attic, and has a five-bay garden front. The windows are casements.	II
Keeper's Cottage; 53.08846°N 2.38710°W	—	c. 1790	A brick cottage in Gothic Revival style. It has a slate roof with ridge tiles and a central chimney. The cottage has a square plan, is in a single storey, and has a three-bay front. The arched windows contain cast iron Y-tracery.	II
Park Farmhouse; 53.09111°N 2.40227°W	—	Early 19th century	The farmhouse is in brick with a slate roof. The main block is in two storeys with an attic, and has a three-bay front, with a two-bay gable. Forming an L-shaped plan is an east wing, with two storeys and three bays. The windows are casements.	II
Statue of Neptune, Crewe Hall; 53.08369°N 2.39943°W	—	Early 19th century	The statue of Neptune was designed by Humphry Repton and formerly overlooked a lake, which has since been drained. It is in stone on a pedestal, and depicts Neptune sitting with a reclining female figure.	II
Sundial, Crewe Hall; 53.08340°N 2.39954°W	—	Early 19th century	The sundial is in stone, iron and bronze. It has a stone base with a tapering twisted column supporting a Corinthian cap. This holds an iron stem carrying bronze angled rings.	II
Vicarage Cottage and Fir Tree Cottage; 53.09455°N 2.41016°W	—	Early 19th century	A pair of brick cottages with tiled roofs, forming an L-shaped plan. They are in a single storey with attics, and each cottage has a front of two bays. The windows are casements, those in the upper floor being in gabled dormers or gable apexes. The gables have bargeboards.	II
North Lodge, Crewe Hall; 53.09100°N 2.39681°W		1847	The lodge was designed by Edward Blore in Jacobean style. It is constructed in stone and brick and has a slate roof. The lodge has an L-shaped plan, is in a single storey, and has a front of three bays. The central bay consists of a hexagonal porch with a pyramidal roof topped by a finial. The outer bays contain shaped gables with diapering, and panels containing the Crewe Estate emblems. All the windows are casements.	II
St Michael's Church; 53.09470°N 2.40920°W		1857–58	The church was built for the 3rd Lord Crewe and was designed by Sir George Gilbert Scott. It is in red brick with decoration in blue brick, standing on a sandstone plinth, and it has a tiled roof. The church consists of a nave, an apsidal chancel, a south porch, a north vestry, and an octagonal turret at the northeast corner. At the west end is a rose window flanked by round panels depicting the Holy Family and angels.	II*
Plum Tree Cottage and Church Cottage; 53.09518°N 2.41011°W	—	1877	A pair of cottages with applied timber-framing and tiled roofs. They are in a single storey with an attic, and each cottage is in two bays. The outer bays contain a porch with a hipped roof. The central bays project forward. In the ground floor are mullioned and transomed casement windows under a lean-to roof. Above, in a timber-framed gable are windows flanked by pilasters, rose motifs, and the date.	II
Gates, piers and walls, Crewe Hall; 53.08195°N 2.40023°W		1878	The gates are in wrought iron, the piers are in stone, and the walls are brick. There are four piers, with double gates between the central two, and single gates between the others. The central piers are surmounted by a griffon and a lion. All are elaborately decorated.	II
Model Farmhouse; 53.09435°N 2.40995°W	—	c. 1880	The farmhouse is in brick with applied timber-framing, and has a tiled roof. It is in Elizabethan style, it has two storeys and a four-bay front. The second bay projects forward with a jettied upper floor under a large gable. There is a smaller gable in the fourth bay. The windows are casements, those in the lower floor having terracotta mullions.	II
Church Hall; 53.09538°N 2.40839°W		1882	Originally a school, the hall is in Jacobean style. It is built in red brick, with blue brick diapering, and has a tiled roof. The hall is in a single storey, and has a four-bay front. In the second bay is a stack-like structure containing a carved panel, an inscribed tablet, a sundial, and the Crewe estate emblems. The fourth bay is gabled and contains the entrance, above which is a segmental pediment containing carved arms in the tympanum. Above this is a circular clock face, and ornamental bargeboards. On the gable is a cupola with an ogee roof and a weathervane. The other bays contain mullioned and transomed windows, and timber-framed gables.	II
Farm buildings, Crewe Hall Home Farm; 53.08012°N 2.39580°W	—	1883	The farm buildings are in brick with a tiled roof. There are three two-storey gabled bays with two single-storey bays with lofts between them. The windows have stone heads and sills. In the lofts are dormers. In the central gable is a panel with the Crewe Estate emblem and the date.	II
Farm buildings, Crewe Hall Home Farm; 53.07978°N 2.39567°W	—	1884	The farm buildings are in brick with a tiled roof. There are three two-storey gabled bays with two single-storey bays with lofts between them. The windows have stone heads and sills. In the lofts are dormers. In the central gable is a panel with the Crewe Estate emblem and the date.	II
Old Vicarage; 53.09346°N 2.41013°W	—	1889	The vicarage has been converted into a private dwelling. It was designed by Thomas Bower, it is built in brick with applied timber-framing, and has a tiled roof. The house is in two storeys with an attic, and has a three-bay entrance front, and a two-bay garden front. On the garden front is a large stone bay window and a verandah. The windows are casements, those in the ground floor having stone mullions and transoms.	II
Milepost; 53.09486°N 2.41037°W	—	c. 1897	The milepost is in cast iron and has a triangular plan. Its sloping top is inscribed with "Cheshire County Council". The faces contain the distances in miles to Nantwich and Whitchurch on the east side, and to Haslington, Wheelock, Sandbach, and Congleton on the west side.	II

== See also ==
- Listed buildings in Crewe
- Listed buildings in Weston
- Listed buildings in Barthomley
- Listed buildings in Haslington
