= St Michael and All Angels Church, Crewe Green =

Coordinates: 53.0947°N 2.4092°W

- St Michael and All Angels Church, Crewe Green, from the northwest in 2026

- Location in Cheshire
- OS grid reference: SJ 727 554
- Location: Crewe Green, Cheshire
- Country: England
- Denomination: Anglican
- Website: St Michael's, Crewe Green

History
- Status: Parish church
- Dedication: St Michael and All Angels

Architecture
- Functional status: Active
- Heritage designation: Grade II*
- Designated: 20 January 1975
- Architect: Sir George Gilbert Scott
- Architectural type: Church
- Style: Gothic Revival
- Completed: 1858

Specifications
- Materials: Brick with tile roof

Administration
- Province: York
- Diocese: Diocese of Chester
- Archdeaconry: Macclesfield
- Deanery: Nantwich
- Parish: Crewe (otherwise Crewe Green)

Clergy
- Vicar: Revd Anne Lawson

St Michael and All Angels Church is in the village of Crewe Green, Cheshire, England. The church is recorded in the National Heritage List for England as a designated Grade II* listed building. It is an active Anglican parish church in the diocese of Chester, the archdeaconry of Macclesfield and the deanery of Nantwich. Its benefice is combined with that of St Matthew, Haslington.

== History ==
The church was built in 1857–58 to a design by Sir George Gilbert Scott for the 3rd Lord Crewe.

== Architecture ==
St Michael's is constructed in red and blue brick, with stone dressings, and is decorated with bands of encaustic tiles. It has a tiled roof. The plan consists of a four-bay nave, with an apsidal chancel, a south porch, a north vestry, and an octagonal turret at the northeast corner of the nave. The church stands on a sandstone plinth, and the walls are decorated with diaper work and blue brick bands. The porch is gabled and in the apex of the gable is an inset panel of Christ blessing. At the west end is a rose window flanked by round panels depicting the Holy Family and angels.

The interior of the church is in white brick with decoration in red brick. The ceiling has beams of dark wood. The reredos contains a fresco of the Last Supper. The pulpit is in stone with dark marble shafts. The font is decorated with the symbols of the Evangelists. The furnishings in the choir are elaborately carved, including poppyheads. The stained glass dates probably from the 1860s, and is probably by Wailes. The scenes at the west end of the church are from the Old Testament, and in the east end are from the New Testament.

== External features ==
The churchyard contains the war graves of a soldier and a sailor of World War II as well as the graves of the 3rd Lord Crewe's niece Amicia Henrietta Fitzgerald, daughter of Richard Monckton Milnes and Annabel Crewe, and her husband Sir Gerald Fitzgerald.

== See also ==
- Grade II* listed buildings in Cheshire East
- List of new churches by George Gilbert Scott in Northern England
- Listed buildings in Crewe Green
