= Frances Crewe, Baroness Crewe =

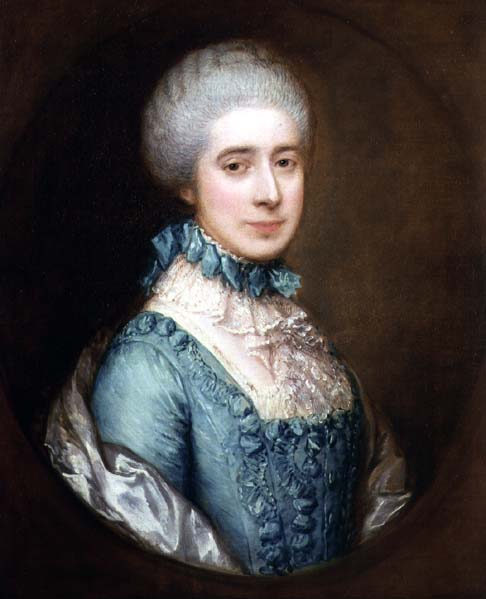
Frances Crewe, by Thomas Gainsborough

Frances Anne Crewe, Lady Crewe (née Greville; November 1748 – 23 December 1818), was the daughter of Fulke Greville, envoy extraordinary to the elector of Bavaria, and his Irish wife, Frances Macartney, who was a poet, best known for "A Prayer for Indifference". She was considered one of the most beautiful women of her time, and was a political hostess with a sharp wit. In late 1783, when William Pitt the younger took office, she famously remarked that he "could do what he pleased during the holidays, but it would only be a mince-pie administration" (in other words it would barely last past Christmas; as it turned out she was wrong in her prediction, but virtually everyone in the political world agreed with her).

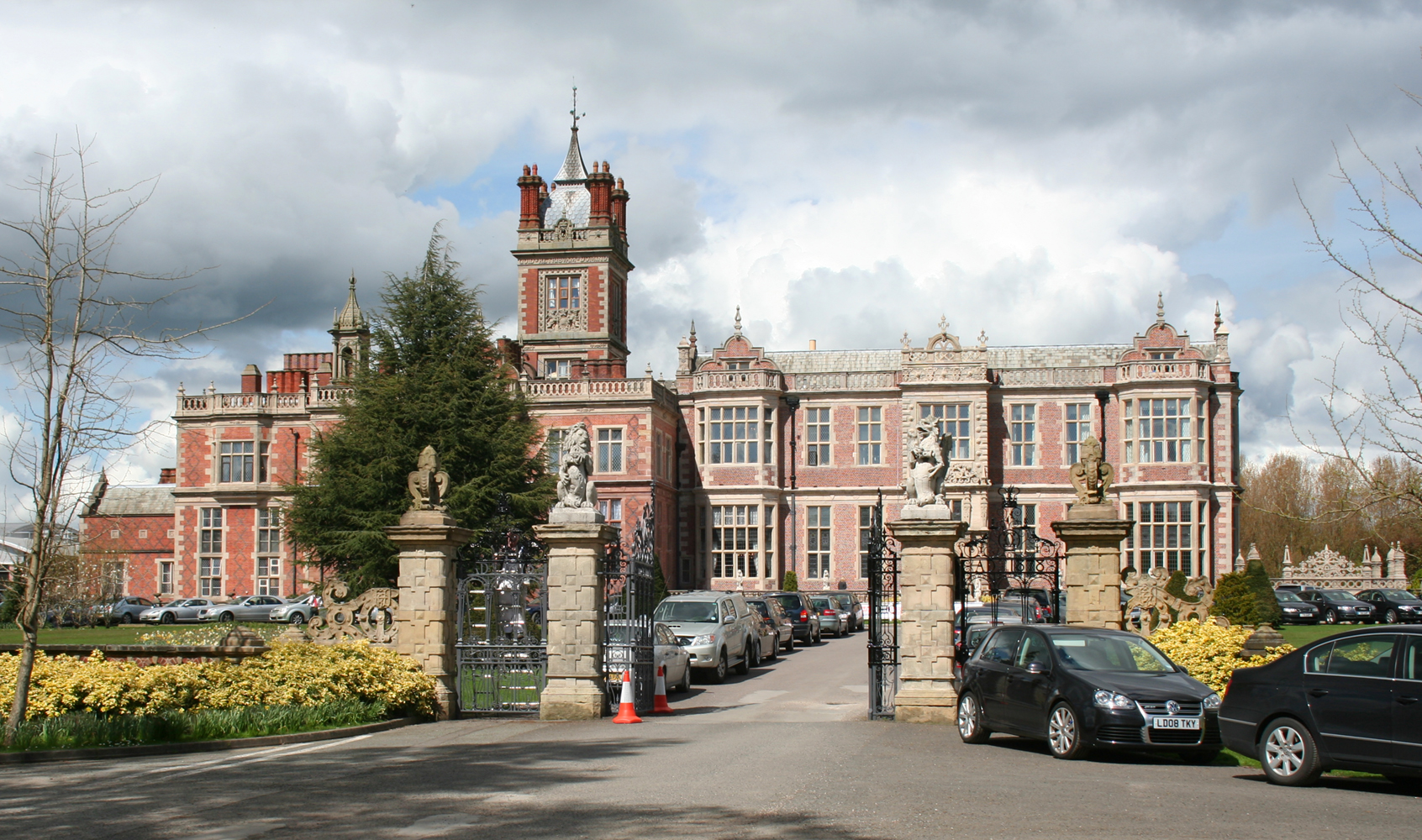
Crewe Hall

In 1766, Frances married John Crewe, who became Baron Crewe. They had four children, of whom two reached adulthood, John Crewe, 2nd Baron Crewe, and Emma Crewe, who married Foster Cunliffe-Offley. The younger John as an adult became completely estranged from his family. She was accustomed to entertain, at Crewe Hall, her husband's seat in Cheshire, and at her villa at Hampstead, some of the most distinguished of her contemporaries. Fox, who much admired her, Edmund Burke, Richard Brinsley Sheridan, Sir Joshua Reynolds, and Canning were frequent visitors. She was also on friendly terms with Charles Burney and Sarah Burney and Hester Thrale.

In May 1784 when Charles James Fox, after an epic battle, was finally confirmed as MP for Westminster, Frances Crewe hosted a party to celebrate, where all the guests were asked to wear Fox's chosen colours, blue and buff. The Prince of Wales gave a toast True blue and Mrs. Crewe. She famously replied True blue and all of you.

Sheridan dedicated the School for Scandal to her, and some lines addressed to her by Fox were printed at the Strawberry Hill Press in 1775. Three portraits by Reynolds have been engraved, in one of which she appears with her brother as Hebe and Cupid. She died on 23 December 1818.
