= Marquess of Crewe =

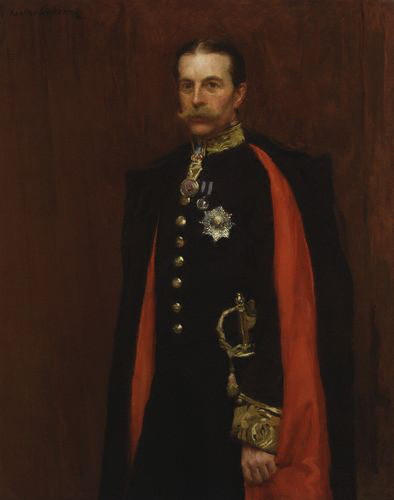
The Marquess of Crewe.

Marquess of Crewe was a title in the Peerage of the United Kingdom. It was created in 1911 for the Liberal statesman Robert Crewe-Milnes, 1st Earl of Crewe. He had already been created Earl of Crewe, of Crewe in the County Palatine of Chester, in 1895, and was made Earl of Madeley, in the County of Stafford, at the same time as he was granted the marquessate. These titles were also in the Peerage of the United Kingdom. Lord Crewe was the only son of the noted Victorian literary personage Richard Monckton Milnes. The latter had been raised to the Peerage of the United Kingdom as Baron Houghton, of Great Houghton in the West Riding of the County of York, in 1863. Lord Houghton married the Honourable Annabella Crewe, daughter of John Crewe, 2nd Baron Crewe (see Baron Crewe). Their son, the second Baron, succeeded to the Crewe estates on the death of his maternal uncle Hungerford Crewe, 3rd Baron Crewe, in 1894. Lord Crewe's two sons both predeceased him and the titles became extinct on his death in 1945.

Richard Slater Milnes, grandfather of the first Baron, was Member of Parliament for the York. Robert Pemberton Milnes, father of the first Baron, was Member of Parliament for Pontefract. Lady Celia Hermione Crewe-Milnes, daughter of the first Marquess, married Sir Edward Clive Coates, 2nd Baronet. In 1946, she and her husband assumed by deed poll the additional surname of Milnes (see Milnes Coates baronets). Richard Milnes, great-great-grandfather of the first Baron, was the uncle of Sir Robert Milnes, 1st Baronet (see Milnes baronets).

== Baron Houghton (1863) ==
- Richard Monckton Milnes, 1st Baron Houghton (1809–1885)
- Robert Offley Ashburton Milnes, 2nd Baron Houghton (1858–1945) (created Earl of Crewe in 1895 and Marquess of Crewe in 1911)

== Marquess of Crewe (1911) ==
- Robert Offley Ashburton Crewe-Milnes, 1st Marquess of Crewe (1858–1945)
  - Hon. Richard Charles Rodes Milnes (1882–1890)
  - Richard George Archibald John Lucian Hungerford Crewe-Milnes, Earl of Madeley (1911–1922)

== See also ==
- Baron Crewe
- Milnes Coates baronets
- Milnes baronets
