= Crewe Green =

Village in Cheshire, England

Coordinates: 53.094743°N 2.408828°W

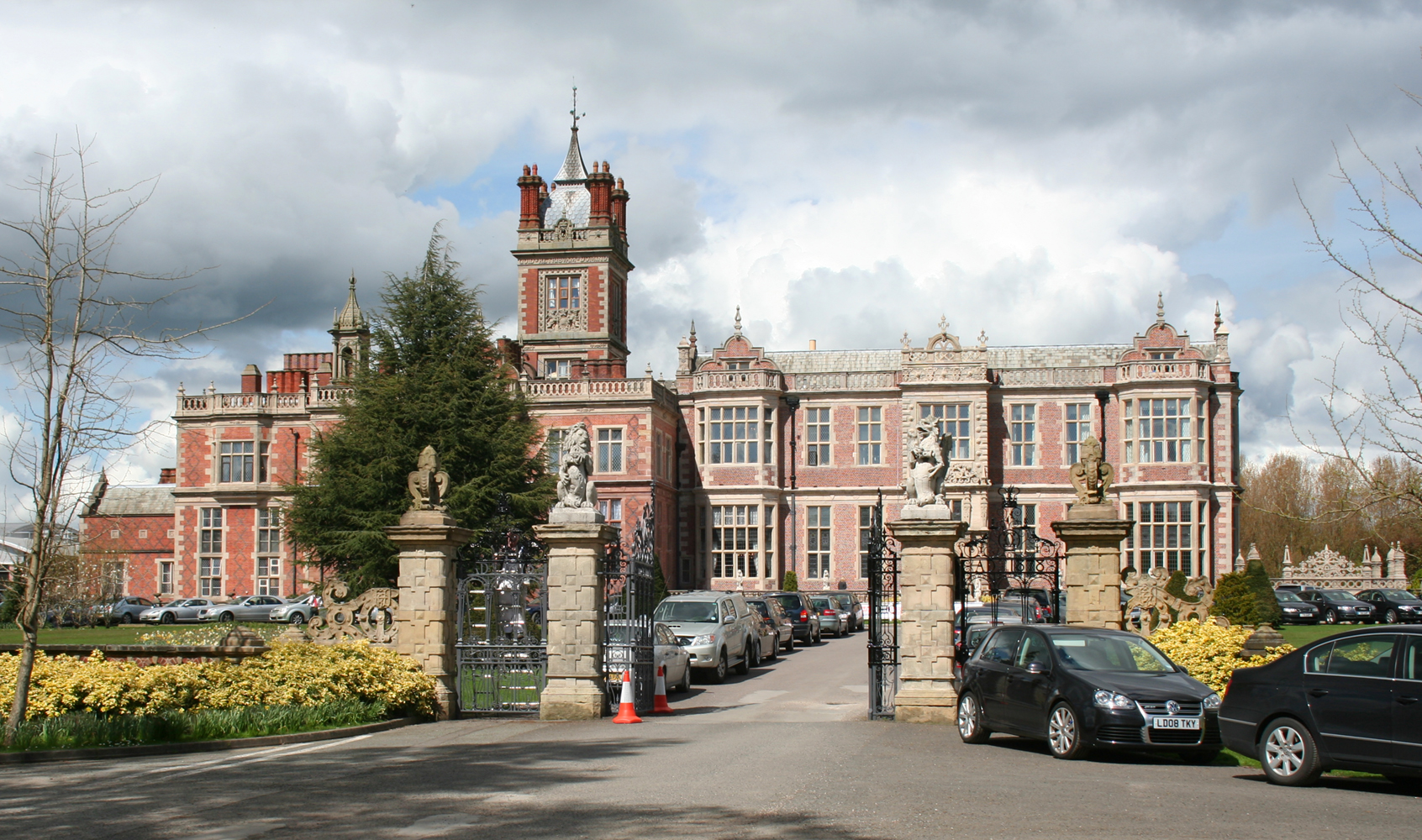
- Crewe Hall

- Location within Cheshire
- Population: 213 (2011)
- OS grid reference: SJ726553
- Civil parish: Weston and Crewe Green
- Unitary authority: Cheshire East
- Ceremonial county: Cheshire
- Region: North West
- Country: England
- Sovereign state: United Kingdom
- Post town: CREWE
- Postcode district: CW1
- Dialling code: 01270
- Police: Cheshire
- Fire: Cheshire
- Ambulance: North West
- UK Parliament: Crewe and Nantwich

Crewe Green is a small village and former civil parish, now in the parish of Weston and Crewe Green, in the unitary authority area of Cheshire East and the ceremonial county of Cheshire, England. The village lies 1½ miles to the east of the centre of Crewe. The parish also includes a dispersed settlement of houses and farms called Slaughter Hill, the Jacobean mansion of Crewe Hall, and the industrial estates of Crewe Hall Enterprise Park and Crewe Hall Farm. Nearby villages include Haslington and Stowford.

According to the 2001 census, the parish had a population of 140, increasing to 213 at the 2011 Census.

== History ==
Crewe Green, then known as Crewe, was originally a township within the ancient parish of Barthomley. In the 12th and 13th centuries, it was the seat of the de Crewe (or de Criwa) family. The manor passed to the de Praers family of Barthomley by the marriage of Johanna de Crewe to Richard de Praers in 1319. Later in the 14th century it passed to the Fouleshurst (or Foulehurst) family, who held the manor jointly with Barthomley until around 1575. Sir Randolph Crewe purchased the manor in 1608, and it was held by various branches of the Crewe family until 1936, when most of the land was sold to the Duchy of Lancaster. The present Crewe Hall was built for Sir Randolph and dates from 1615 to 1636.

Crewe Green was made a separate ecclesiastical parish in 1857, and a separate civil parish in 1866. It also lay within Nantwich Hundred, Nantwich Poor Law Union, and Nantwich Rural Sanitary District. Later on it was part of Nantwich Rural District. Changes to its boundaries were made in 1936, which included the transfer of Crewe railway station from the civil parish to the municipal borough of Crewe, adjacent to it. In 1974 local government re-organisation saw it become part of the borough of Crewe and Nantwich. The parish was renamed in 1984 from Crewe to Crewe Green to avoid confusion with the neighbouring town. On 1 April 2023 the parish was abolished to form "Weston and Crewe Green".

== Governance ==
From 1974 the civil parish was served by Crewe and Nantwich Borough Council, which was succeeded on 1 April 2009 by the new unitary authority of Cheshire East. Crewe Green falls in the parliamentary constituency of Crewe and Nantwich, which has been represented by Kieran Mullan since 2019, after being represented by Laura Smith (2017–19), Edward Timpson (2008–17) and Gwyneth Dunwoody (1983–2008).

== Geography ==
The Crewe–Alsager railway line and the B5077 road ran east–west through the parish, and the Crewe and Nantwich Circular Walk runs north–south through it. Valley Brook (also known as the River Waldron) ran through the civil parish, as does Englesea Brook, which joins the Valley Brook about 300 metres (980 ft) south of the parish church, after having formed the boundary between Crewe Green and the unparished area that comprises the town of Crewe. For a short distance, the boundary then followed Valley Brook. The majority of the gardens and parkland of Crewe Hall were located within the civil parish; 201 hectares (497 acres) are listed by the National Register of Historic Parks and Gardens at grade II. They contain deciduous woodland including Rookery Wood and Temple of Peace Wood.

== Landmarks ==
St Michael and All Angels Church stands in Crewe Green village. The grade-I-listed Jacobean mansion of Crewe Hall, now a hotel and restaurant, is located at SJ733540. Several other listed buildings on the Crewe Hall estate fall within the civil parish, including the stables quadrangle of the hall, which dates from around 1636 and is listed at grade II*.

== See also ==
- Listed buildings in Crewe Green
