= John Crewe, 1st Baron Crewe =

British politician

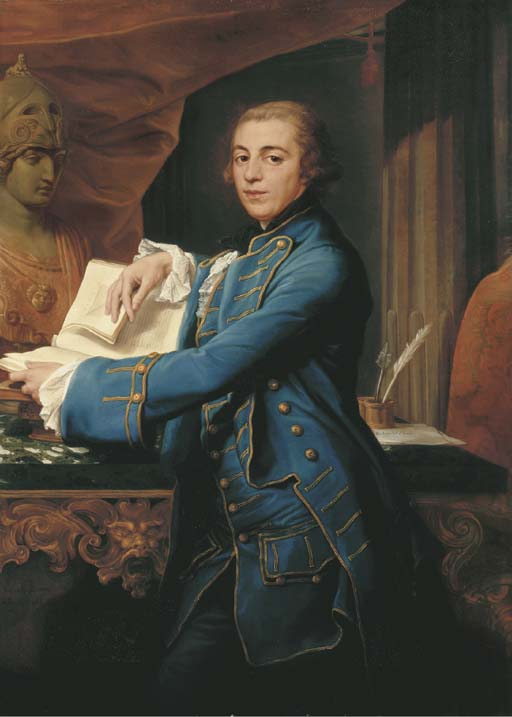
John Crewe, age about 18; by Pompeo Batoni

John Crewe, 1st Baron Crewe (27 September 1742 – 28 April 1829), of Crewe Hall in Cheshire, was a British politician. He is chiefly remembered for his sponsorship of the Parliament Act 1782 (22 Geo. 3. c. 41), also known as 'Crewe's Act', which barred customs officers and post office officials from voting.

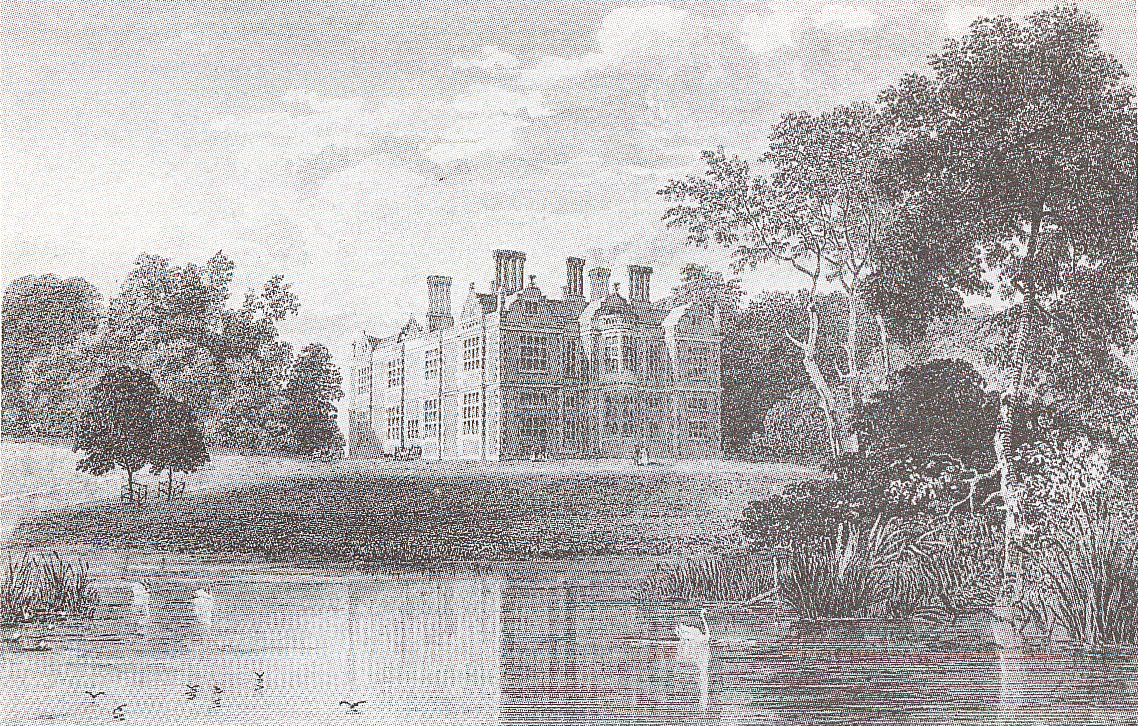
Crewe Hall, Cheshire c.1818

== Early life ==
Crewe was the eldest son of John Crewe, Member of Parliament for Cheshire between 1734 and 1752, and grandson of John Offley Crewe who had also held the same seat before him. On his father's death in 1752 he succeeded to Crewe Hall.

== Parliamentary career ==
In 1764 he was chosen High Sheriff of Cheshire, and he entered parliament at a by-election in 1765 as Whig member for Stafford; but at the next general election, in 1768, he was returned unopposed for Cheshire, which he represented for the next 34 years. He was never opposed for Cheshire, and presumably was highly regarded locally: the Dictionary of National Biography records that he was "an enlightened agriculturalist and a good landlord".

In the factional politics of the Whig Party, Crewe was initially a friend and follower of the Duke of Grafton, but later became a particular supporter of Charles James Fox, apparently subsidising him to the tune of £1,200 a year. After Fox's resignation from office in 1782, the incoming administration considered offering Crewe some governmental office to secure his support, but were told that his only ambition was for a peerage. He remained loyal to Fox, and in February 1784 was on Fox's list of new peers to be made should he return to office as he hoped. Fox did not succeed in returning to power at that point, but eventually – four years after his retirement from the Commons – Crewe was rewarded with the desired peerage when Fox finally returned to office in 1806. Crewe was created Baron Crewe, of Crewe in the County Palatine of Chester on 25 February 1806.

Crewe rarely spoke in the House of Commons, and more than half his recorded contributions concerned a single measure, the Parliament Act 1782 which thereafter bore his name. This was an attempt to curb a particular source of corruption in elections: in many of the rotten boroughs of the period, only a few votes were needed to swing elections, and it was common for those who held the power of appointment to various well-paid official posts to reserve these for voters in return for co-operation at election time. The scale of the problem may be judged by Prime Minister Rockingham's statement that 11,500 officers of customs and excise were electors, and that 70 Commons seats were decided chiefly by such votes. William Dowdeswell had attempted in 1770 to put a stop to this practice by preventing officers of the Custom, Excise and Post Office from voting. This measure had not reached the statute book, but Crewe introduced a bill with the same object in 1780 and again in 1781, succeeding on the latter occasion in passing it into law. Unfortunately, the new regulation was easily evaded, as the power of patronage was simply shifted to offer lucrative offices to the voters' relatives instead of to the voters themselves.

== Private life ==
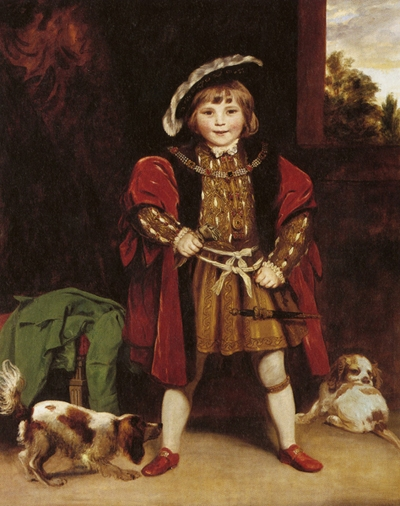
Master Crewe as Henry VIII by Joshua Reynolds, 1775

He married Frances Anne Greville, daughter of Fulke Greville (1717-1806) and Frances Macartney, in 1766, and they had two surviving children:

- John, who succeeded him in the peerage, but became completely estranged from his family;
- Elizabeth Emma Crewe, who married Foster Cunliffe-Offley.

Lord Crewe died in 1829. His wife, usually known simply as "Mrs Crewe", was a noted political hostess. She died in 1818.

== Arms ==
Coat of arms of John Crewe, 1st Baron Crewe
Crest 1st Out of a ducal coronet Or a lion's jamb erect Argent (Crewe) 2nd a demi-lion rampant guardant Or holding in the paws a slip of olive Proper (Offley) Escutcheon Quarterly, 1st and 4th Azure a lion rampant Argent (Crewe), 2nd and 3rd Argent a cross couped, the points terminating in fleurs-de-lis Azure and charged in the centre with a lion passant guardant Or (Offley). Supporters Dexter a lion Argent gorged with a plain collar Azure charged with three roses Or, sinister a griffin Sable beaked and membered Or wings elevated Argent. Motto Sequor Nec Inferior (I Follow Not As An Inferior)

Parliament of Great Britain
Preceded by The Viscount Chetwynd; William Richard Chetwynd	Member of Parliament for Stafford; 1765–1768; With: The Viscount Chetwynd	Succeeded by The Viscount Chetwynd; Richard Whitworth
Preceded by Thomas Cholmondeley; Samuel Egerton	Member of Parliament for Cheshire; 1768–1801; With: Samuel Egerton 1768–1780; Sir Robert Salusbury Cotton 1780–1796; Thomas Cholmondeley 1796–1801	Succeeded by Parliament of the United Kingdom
Parliament of the United Kingdom
Preceded by Parliament of Great Britain	Member of Parliament for Cheshire; 1801–1802; With: Thomas Cholmondeley	Succeeded by Thomas Cholmondeley; William Egerton
Peerage of the United Kingdom
New creation	Baron Crewe; 1806–1829	Succeeded by John Crewe
