= John Crewe, 2nd Baron Crewe =

British Army general, art collector/dealer (1772–1835)

General The Right Honourable The Lord Crewe
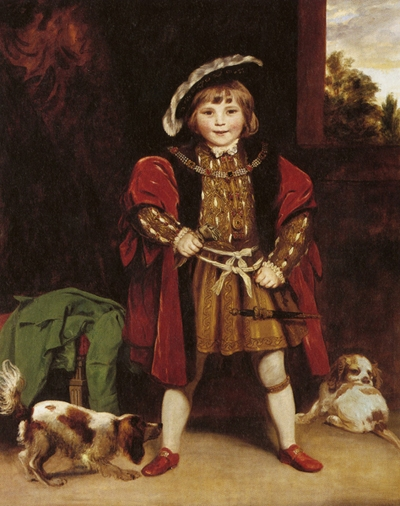
- Master Crewe as Henry VIII, by Sir Joshua Reynolds, c. 1775
- Born: 1772
- Died: 4 December 1835 (aged 62–63)
- Spouse: Henrietta Maria Anna Walker-Hungerford (m. 1807)
- Children: 4, including Hungerford
- Parent(s): John Crewe, 1st Baron Crewe; Frances Anne Greville

John Crewe, 2nd Baron Crewe (bap. 1772 – 4 December 1835) was an English soldier and a peer. He formed part of the first British embassy to China, and rose to the rank of General. Becoming estranged from the majority of his family, he spent much of his life in self-imposed exile on the Continent. He is perhaps best known for a painting of him as a child by Sir Joshua Reynolds.

== Early life ==
Crewe was the son of John Crewe (1742–1829) of Crewe Hall, a wealthy Whig politician who was created the first Baron Crewe in 1806. His mother, Frances Anne Crewe, the daughter of Fulke Greville, was a political hostess known for her great beauty and wit. His younger sister, Elizabeth Emma (1780–1850), married Foster Cunliffe-Offley; two other siblings, Richard and Frances, did not survive infancy.

As a child in around 1775, he was painted by Sir Joshua Reynolds in a pose and costume that mimic the well-known portrait of Henry VIII by Hans Holbein the Younger. The portrait is considered among the artist's finest portrayals of children, and has been described as "one of Reynolds' freshest attempts at comedy painting". Horace Walpole commented: "Is not there humour and satire in Sir Joshua's reducing Holbein's swaggering and colossal haughtiness of Henry VIII to the boyish jollity of Master Crewe?"

Frances Burney described him in the early 1790s as "a silent and reserved, but, I think, sensible young man". Local historian Ray Gladden describes him at the time of his entrance into the army as "high spirited", accruing gambling debts that his father had to pay off by selling land. One of his daughters later remembered that he claimed his total debts were never above £80,000, then a huge sum.

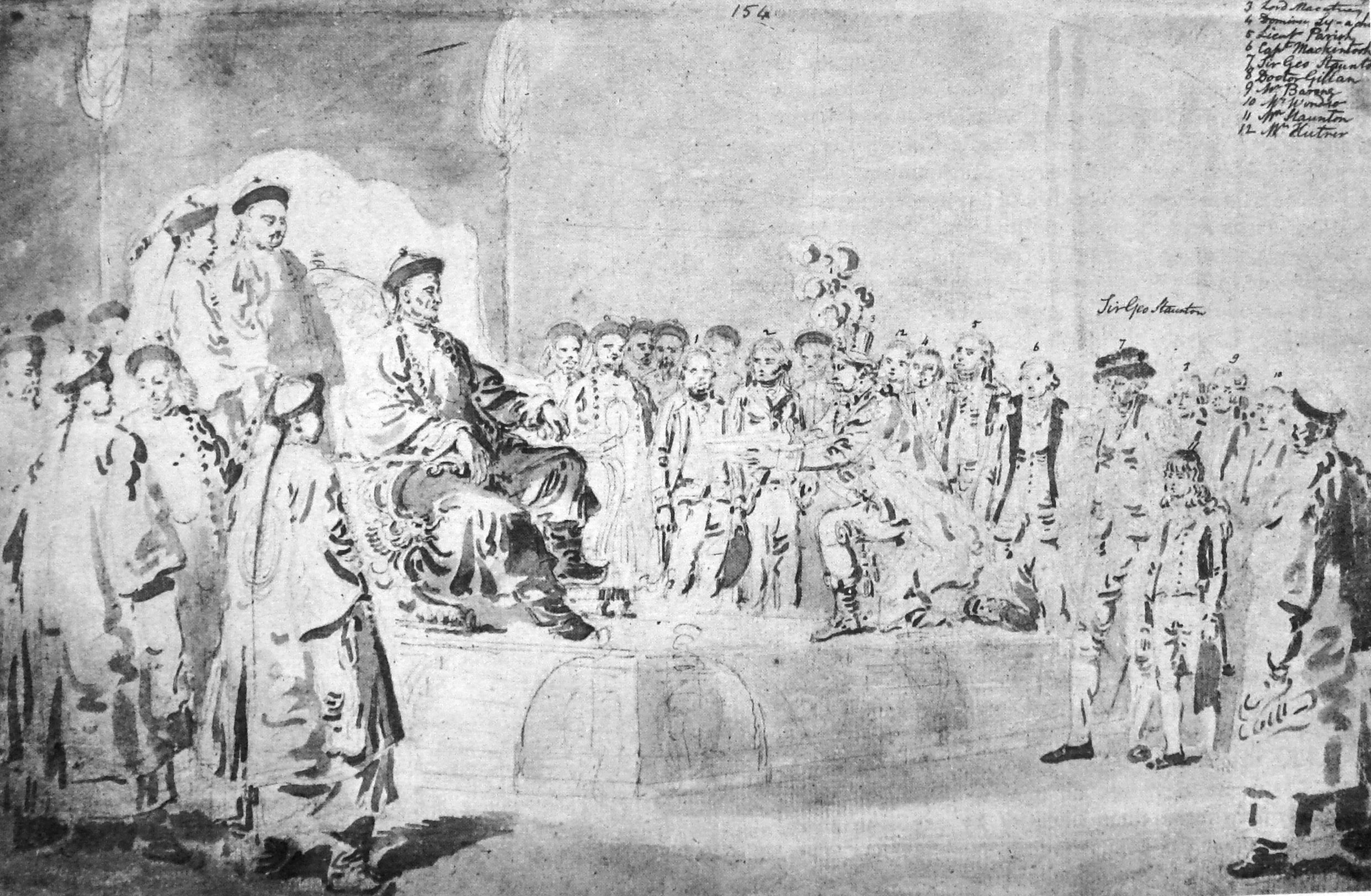
The embassy meeting the Emperor of China, by William Alexander

== Army career ==
Crewe entered the army in the 1790s. In 1793, when he held the rank of a lieutenant, he was a member of the Macartney Embassy to China, led by Lord Macartney, who was his mother's cousin. Crewe rose to the rank of Major-General in 1808, Lieutenant-General in 1813 and full General in 1830, before retiring in 1831. He lost the sight in one eye during active service.

== Marriage and children ==
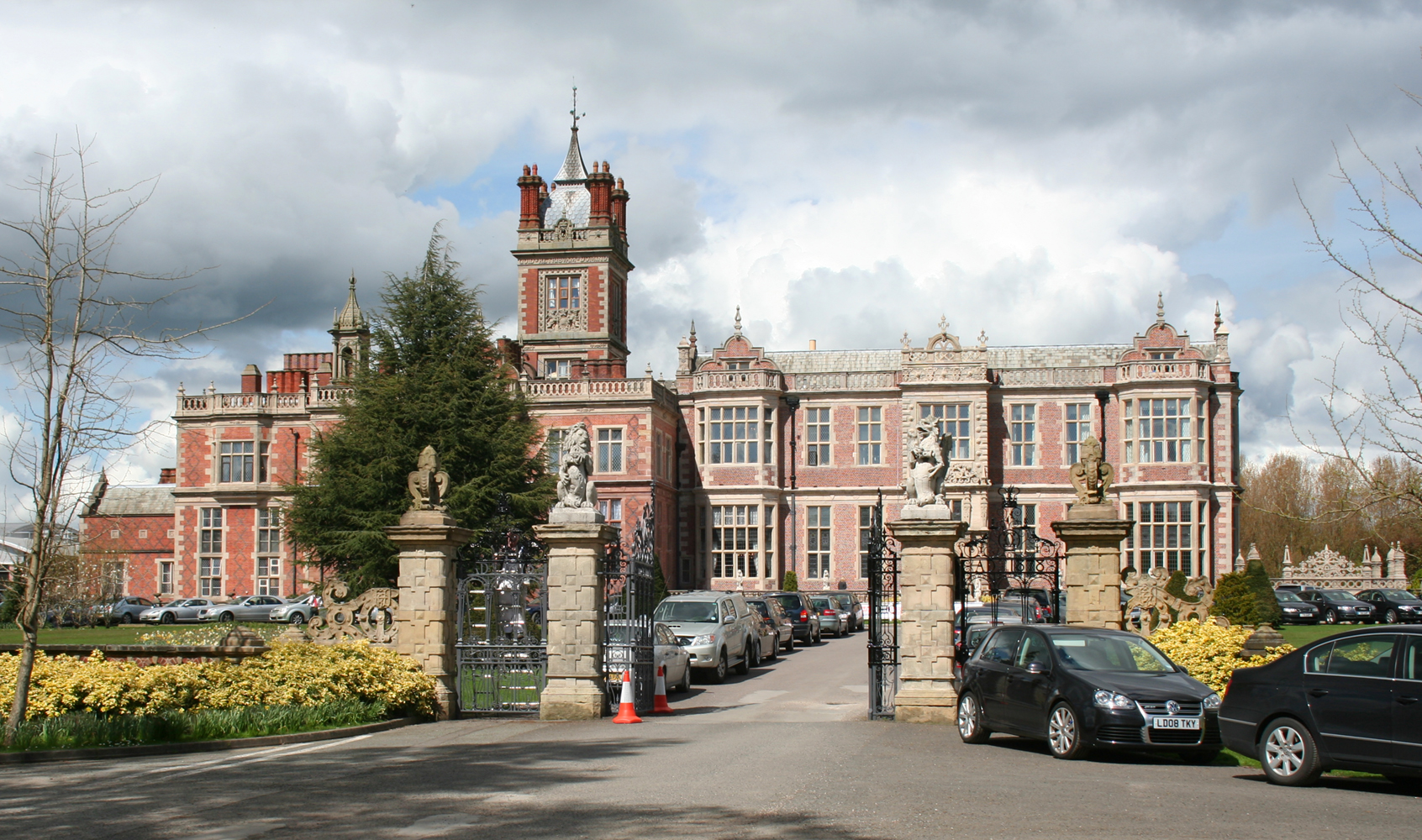
Crewe Hall

On 5 May 1807, he married Henrietta Maria Anna Walker-Hungerford, daughter of George Walker and Henrietta Maria Keate Walker. She was the heiress to a substantial fortune derived from her father's family's Barbados sugar plantations. She was a first cousin of James Smithson, the founding benefactor of the Smithsonian Institution (her mother was Smithson's aunt). The couple had four children: three daughters, Henrietta Mary (1808–79), Maria Hungerford (who died in infancy) and Annabella Hungerford (1814–1874), and a son, Hungerford (1812–94).

According to Gladden, the marriage was not a happy one. On 15 September 1813, in Byford, Herefordshire, an illegitimate son was born to Crewe. Discreet arrangements were made with a childless local couple, John and Ann Griffiths, to claim that this child, named John (later to become Rev. John Griffiths), was their biological son. This relationship was well known and acknowledged by both family (including his half-sister Annabella Hungerford in particular) and local villages alike. In recognition of this relationship John's first issue male descendants, to this day, have the names Houghton, Monckton and/or Milnes included in their names. Also, Gladden states that Crewe contracted a second bigamous marriage in 1820, which was carried out at the chapel at the family seat of Crewe Hall and officiated over by a billiard-maker. This second marriage resulted in an illegitimate daughter.

Henrietta Crewe died in 1820, aged 48. The couple's three surviving children, aged between six and eleven, became wards of court, and lived with Lord Crewe at Crewe Hall. Hungerford Crewe was eccentric as a child and is said to have seen little of his father. A family history written by Robert Crewe-Milnes, 1st Marquess of Crewe, states that John Crewe regarded his only son with "nothing but contempt."

== Wealth from slavery ==
Following the abolition of slavery in 1833, Crewe was one of those awarded compensation by Parliament for the loss of his "property" at Four Hills and The Rock, sugar plantation estates on Barbados that he had acquired through his wife.

== Life abroad ==
Crewe lived abroad for many years while he was in the army and after his retirement. In 1817, he was imprisoned in France after being falsely accused of owing 23,945 francs to a hotel-keeper. The Times quotes the French newspaper The Moniteur:

The most extraordinary feature in this case ... is, that General Crewe preferred to remain for five months and a half in prison, and to sacrifice in the expenses of suit a sum much larger than the pretended debt, rather than pay to Brunet a sum which he did not owe. This ... is one of those causes which may serve to fix our opinion as to the English character.

On his father's death in 1829, he became the second Baron Crewe. Gladden states that his father cut him out of his will, so far as was possible. Crewe Hall and the rental income from the Crewe family's large estates in Cheshire and Staffordshire were inherited by his sister, Elizabeth Cunliffe-Offley. Small bequests were left to John Crewe's daughters.

Lord Crewe never subsequently lived at Crewe Hall. By this date he was living at the chateau Bois l'-Evèque, near Liège in Belgium. His younger daughter, Annabella, went to live with the Cunliffe-Offleys in Madeley, resulting in a permanent breach between her and her father. She married Richard Monckton Milnes in 1851. His older daughter, Henrietta, moved to Belgium to live with her father, and subsequently converted to Roman Catholicism. She returned to England after her father's death and never married, maintaining an establishment for many years in the grounds of Prior Park, Bath.

Lord Crewe died at Bois l'Evèque in 1835, and is buried at Barthomley, Cheshire, where the family chapel is located. He was succeeded by his son, Hungerford Crewe. Hungerford Crewe inherited Crewe Hall and the Crewe family estates two years later.

== Arms ==
Coat of arms of John Crewe, 2nd Baron Crewe
| Crest 1st Out of a ducal coronet Or a lion's jamb erect Argent (Crewe) 2nd a demi-lion rampant guardant Or holding in the paws a slip of olive Proper (Offley) Escutcheon Quarterly, 1st and 4th Azure a lion rampant Argent (Crewe), 2nd and 3rd Argent a cross couped, the points terminating in fleurs-de-lis Azure and charged in the centre with a lion passant guardant Or (Offley). Supporters Dexter a lion Argent gorged with a plain collar Azure charged with three roses Or, sinister a griffin Sable beaked and membered Or wings elevated Argent. Motto Sequor Nec Inferior (I Follow Not As An Inferior) |

Peerage of the United Kingdom
| Preceded by John Crewe | Baron Crewe; 1829–1835 | Succeeded by Hungerford Crewe |
