= Master Crewe as Henry VIII =

Painting by Joshua Reynolds

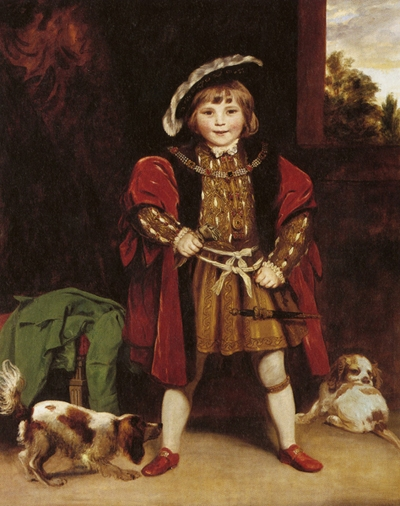
- Artist: Joshua Reynolds
- Year: 1775
- Type: Oil on canvas, portrait painting
- Dimensions: 140 cm × 110 cm (55 in × 43 in)
- Location: Tate Britain, London

Master Crewe as Henry VIII is a 1775 portrait painting by the British artist Joshua Reynolds. It depicts John, the three-year old son of the British politician John Crewe. The younger Crewe would grow up to become a soldier and took part in the Macartney Embassy of 1793. He later succeeded his father as Baron Crewe.

The composition was inspired by Holbein's sixteenth century Portrait of Henry VIII. The work as submitted to the Royal Academy's Summer Exhibition of 1776 at Pall Mall. Horace Walpole praised the way Reynolds had transformed the "swaggering and colossal haughtiness" of the original image to the "boyish jollity of Master Crewe". The painting is in a private collection but is a long-term loan to the Tate Britain. A mezzotint based on the painting was created by John Raphael Smith.

== Bibliography ==
- Sillars, Stuart. Painting Shakespeare: The Artist as Critic, 1720-1820. Cambridge University Press, 2006.
- Wendorf, Richard. Sir Joshua Reynolds: The Painter in Society. Harvard University Press, 1998.
