= Baron Crewe =

Title in the Peerage of the United Kingdom

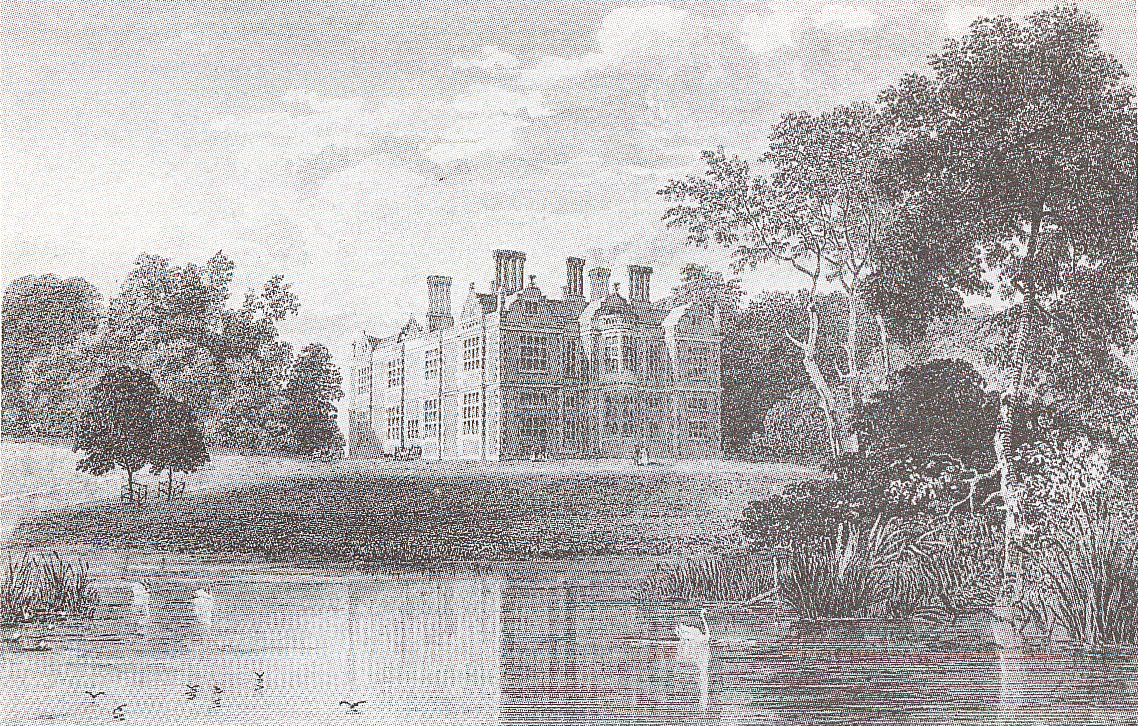
Crewe Hall, the seat of the Crewe family.

Baron Crewe, of Crewe in the County of Chester, was a title in the Peerage of the United Kingdom. It was created on 25 February 1806 for the politician and landowner John Crewe, of Crewe Hall, Cheshire. This branch of the Crewe (or Crew) family descended from Sir Ranulph Crewe (1558–1646), Speaker of the House of Commons and Lord Chief Justice of the King's Bench. He was the brother of Sir Thomas Crewe, also Speaker of the House of Commons and the father of John Crew, 1st Baron Crew (a title which became extinct in 1721; see Baron Crew). Sir Ranulph's grandson John Crewe was the father of Ann Crewe, who married John Offley, of Madeley Manor, Staffordshire. Their son John assumed by Act of Parliament the surname of Crewe in lieu of his patronymic in 1708. He sat as a Knight of the Shire for Cheshire. His son John Crewe also represented Cheshire in Parliament. The latter was the father of the first Baron Crewe. Lord Crewe died in 1829 and was succeeded by his son, the second Baron. He was a General in the British Army. The title became extinct on the death of his son, the third Baron, in 1894.

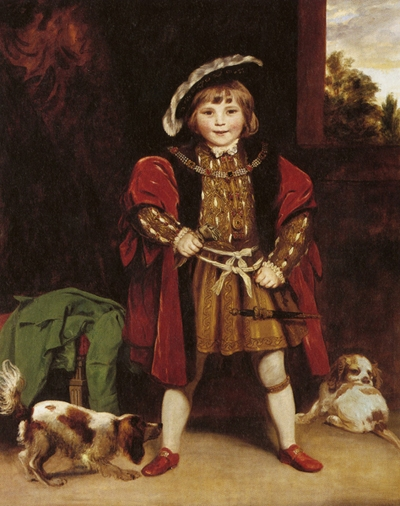
Master Crewe as Henry VIII by Joshua Reynolds, 1775. The second Baron Crew at the age of three.

The Honourable Annabella, daughter of the second Baron, married Richard Monckton Milnes, 1st Baron Houghton. Their son Robert succeeded to the Crewe estates on the death of his maternal uncle in 1894 and assumed the same year the additional surname of Crewe by Royal licence. He became a distinguished Liberal politician and was created Earl of Crewe in 1895 and Marquess of Crewe in 1911.

Richard Crewe, brother of the first Baron, was a Major-General in the British Army. His great-grandson Sir Charles Preston Crewe (1858–1936) was a Brigadier-General in the South African Defence Force and a member of the House of Assembly of the Union of South Africa.

== Barons Crewe (1806) ==
- John Crewe, 1st Baron Crewe (1742–1829)
- John Crewe, 2nd Baron Crewe (1772–1835)
- Hungerford Crewe, 3rd Baron Crewe (1812–1894)

== Arms ==
Coat of arms of Baron Crewe
Crest 1st Out of a ducal coronet Or a lion's jamb erect Argent (Crewe) 2nd a demi-lion rampant guardant Or holding in the paws a slip of olive Proper (Offley) Escutcheon Quarterly, 1st and 4th Azure a lion rampant Argent (Crewe), 2nd and 3rd Argent a cross couped, the points terminating in fleurs-de-lis Azure and charged in the centre with a lion passant guardant Or (Offley). Supporters Dexter a lion Argent gorged with a plain collar Azure charged with three roses Or, sinister a griffin Sable beaked and membered Or wings elevated Argent. Motto Sequor Nec Inferior (I Follow Not As An Inferior)

== See also ==
- Baron Crew
- Marquess of Crewe
