= Hungerford Crewe, 3rd Baron Crewe =

English landowner and peer (1812–1894)

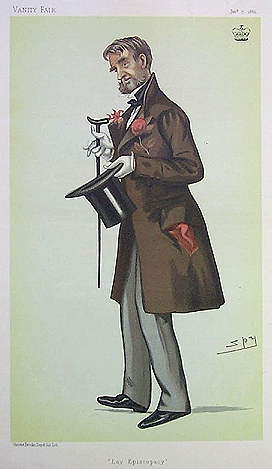
"Lay Episcopacy" Lord Crewe as caricatured by Spy (Leslie Ward) in Vanity Fair, January 1882

Hungerford Crewe, 3rd Baron Crewe FSA, FRS (10 August 1812 – 3 January 1894) was an English landowner and peer. He was elected a fellow of the Society of Antiquaries in 1840 and of the Royal Society in 1841.

== Education and family ==
The son of John Crewe, 2nd Baron Crewe, an army general, and Henrietta Maria Anna Walker-Hungerford, Crewe was educated at Eton College and Christ Church, Oxford. He had two sisters: Henrietta Hungerford Offley Crewe (1808–1879) and Annabella Hungerford Crewe (1814–1874). He also had an illegitimate sister by an unknown woman and an illegitimate brother, Rev John Griffiths (1813 – ?), the latter being well known and acknowledged by both family and local villagers alike. The correspondence of his sisters, which include many references to Hungerford Crewe, as well as a small number of letters by Hungerford himself, are deposited at the Borthwick Institute for Archives in York.

== Landlord and charitable works ==
On his father's death in 1835, he became the third Baron Crewe and inherited the Jacobean mansion of Crewe Hall in Cheshire, together with a large estate in Cheshire, Staffordshire and Leicestershire. In 1871, he was the fifth greatest landowner in Cheshire, with a total of 10,148 acres (4,107 ha). At his death in 1894, the total rents were estimated at £37,000 per year. He appears to have been a relatively benevolent landlord, rebuilding farms, providing cottages and endowing schools. In 1866, he paid more compensation to tenant farmers whose herds were affected by the cattle plague outbreak than was required by law. He also made many charitable gifts, for example in Sandbach where he donated his income as lord of the manor to the local board, gave land for a town and market hall, and erected a drinking fountain.

It was a period of rapid change: when he inherited the estate, the area to the west of Crewe Hall park was countryside with scattered farms; by his death it was occupied by the major railway centre of Crewe. He unsuccessfully opposed the construction of a Silverdale and Madeley Railway Company line from Newcastle-under-Lyme to Wrexham, which passed through the Crewe estate.

== Alterations to Crewe Hall ==
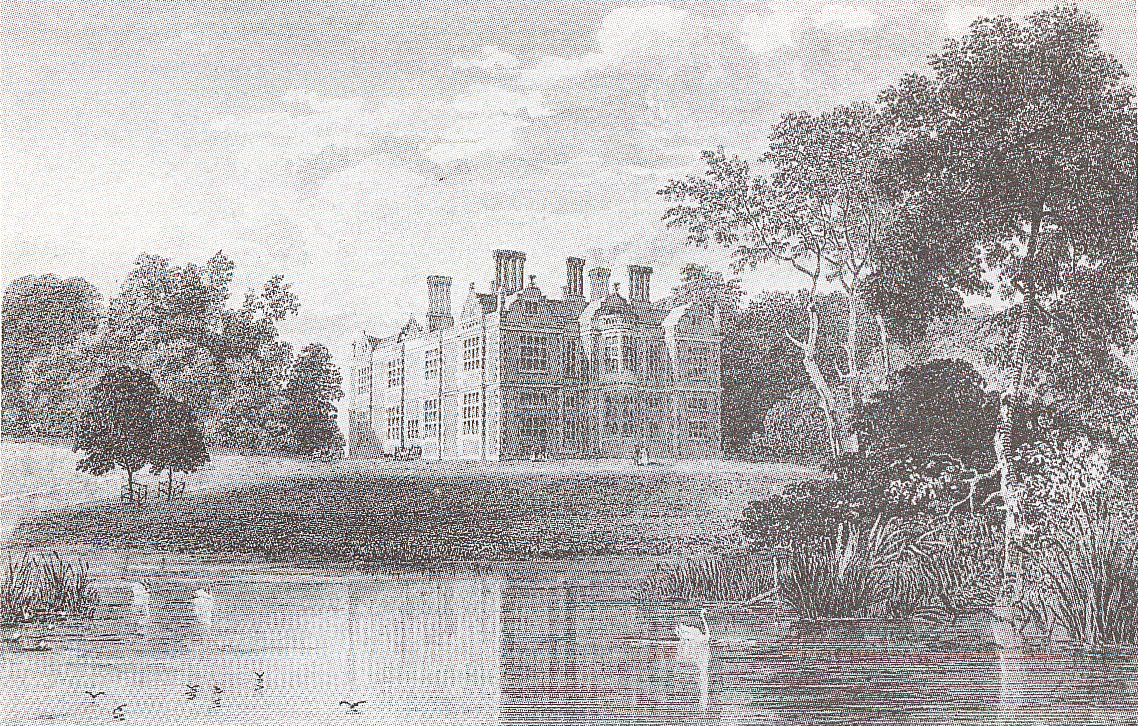
Garden front and lake, from an engraving of c. 1818

Lord Crewe commissioned Edward Blore to make alterations to Crewe Hall in 1837–42. These included major changes to the plan of the building, redecoration of the interior in a Jacobethan style more sympathetic to the original Jacobean house, and modernisations including the installation of a warm-air heating system. Blore also added a centrepiece and clock-tower to the stables quadrangle and built a gate lodge. The total cost of the works was £30,000.

A fire gutted the main hall in January 1866. Extensive restoration work was carried out for Lord Crewe by E. M. Barry, son of Sir Charles Barry, the architect of the Palace of Westminster (1866–70). Barry added a tower to the west wing; required for water storage, the tower was intended to unite the east and west wings of the hall. He also reorganised the plan of the ground floor. The gardens were redesigned after the fire by W. A. Nesfield, and his son William Eden Nesfield also designed various estate buildings.

== Death ==
Lord Crewe died of influenza at Crewe Hall in 1894. He never married and the barony became extinct on his death. His estates were inherited by his nephew, Robert Milnes, Baron Houghton, later Earl and Marquess of Crewe, son of his sister Annabella Hungerford Milnes, née Crewe, Lady Houghton.

== Arms ==
Coat of arms of Hungerford Crewe, 3rd Baron Crewe
Crest 1st Out of a ducal coronet Or a lion's jamb erect Argent (Crewe) 2nd a demi-lion rampant guardant Or holding in the paws a slip of olive Proper (Offley) Escutcheon Quarterly, 1st and 4th Azure a lion rampant Argent (Crewe), 2nd and 3rd Argent a cross couped, the points terminating in fleurs-de-lis Azure and charged in the centre with a lion passant guardant Or (Offley). Supporters Dexter a lion Argent gorged with a plain collar Azure charged with three roses Or, sinister a griffin Sable beaked and membered Or wings elevated Argent. Motto Sequor Nec Inferior (I Follow Not As An Inferior)

Peerage of the United Kingdom
Preceded by John Crewe	Baron Crewe; 1835–1894	Extinct
