= St. Matthew's Church =

St. Matthew's Church, or variations such as St. Matthew Church or Saint Matthew's Catholic Church, may refer to:

== Australia ==
- St Matthew's Church, Guildford, Western Australia
- St Matthew's Church, Marryatville, South Australia
- St Matthews Anglican Church, Grovely, Mitchelton, Brisbane, Queensland
- St Matthew's Roman Catholic Church, Windsor, New South Wales

== Canada ==
- St. Matthew's United Church (Halifax), Nova Scotia
- St. Matthew's Anglican Church (Ottawa), Ontario

== Denmark ==
- St. Matthew's Church, Copenhagen

== Finland ==
- Espoo Cathedral

== Germany ==
- St. Matthew's Church, Hamburg
- St. Matthew, Leipzig (Matthäikirche)

== Jersey ==
- St Matthew's Church, Jersey, in Millbrook

== Lithuania ==
- St. Matthew Church, Anykščiai

== Malta ==
- St Matthew's Chapel, Qrendi
- Church of St Matthew, Qrendi

== Myanmar ==
- St Matthew's Church, Moulmein (Mawlamyine), Mon State

== Namibia ==
- St. Matthew's Anglican Church (Namibia), in Walvis Bay

== New Zealand ==
- St Matthew's, Auckland
- St. Matthew's Church, Dunedin

== Poland ==
- St. Matthew's Church, Łódź

== Singapore ==
- St. Matthew's Church, Singapore

== Sweden ==
- St. Matthew's Church, Stockholm

== United Kingdom ==
- St Matthew's Church, Brixton, London
- St Matthew's Church, Bromborough Pool, Merseyside
- St Matthew's Church, Buckley, Flintshire, Wales
- St Matthew's Church, Burnley, Lancashire
- St Matthew's Church, Cotham, Bristol
- St Matthew Friday Street, a historical church that was demolished in London
- St. Matthew's Church, Harwell, Oxfordshire
- St Matthew's Church, Haslington, Cheshire
- St Matthew's Church, Leyburn, North Yorkshire
- St Matthew's Church, Little Lever, Greater Manchester
- Church of St Matthew and St James, Mossley Hill, Liverpool
- St Matthew's Church, Newbottle, Tyne and Wear
- St Matthew's Church, Newcastle upon Tyne, Tyne and Wear
- St Matthew's Church, Northampton
- St Matthew's Church, Oxhey, Hertfordshire
- St Matthew's Church, Paisley, Renfrewshire
- St Matthew's Church, Perth, Perth and Kinross
- St Matthew's Church, Preston, Lancashire
- St Matthew's Church, Rastrick, West Yorkshire
- St Matthew's Church, Saltney, Flintshire
- St Matthew's Church, Sheffield, Yorkshire
- St Matthew's Church, Silverhill, Hastings, East Sussex
- St Matthew's Church, Stretton, Cheshire
- St Matthew's Church, Walsall, West Midlands
- St Matthew's Church, Westminster, London
- St Matthew's Church, Widcombe, Bath
- St Matthew's Church, Wigan, Greater Manchester
- St Matthew's Church, North Quay, Douglas, Isle of Man, one of the Registered Buildings of the Isle of Man

== United States ==
- Saint Matthew's Catholic Church (Mobile, Alabama)
- St. Matthew's Episcopal Church (National City, California)
- St. Matthew Church (Norwalk, Connecticut)
- St. Matthew's by the Bridge Episcopal Church, Iowa Falls, Iowa
- St. Matthew's Episcopal Church (Houma, Louisiana)
- St. Matthew's Episcopal Church (Hallowell, Maine)
- St. Matthew's Church (Seat Pleasant, Maryland)
- St. Matthew's Episcopal Church (Worcester, Massachusetts), NRHP-listed
- Saint Matthew Parish, Detroit, Michigan
- Saint Matthew's Parish Complex, St. Louis, Missouri, listed on the National Register of Historic Places (NRHP)
- St. Matthew's Episcopal Church (Queens), in Woodhaven, New York
- St. Matthew Catholic Church (Charlotte, North Carolina)
- St. Matthew's Episcopal Church and Churchyard, Hillsborough, North Carolina
- St. Matthew's Episcopal Church (Barrington, Rhode Island)
- St. Matthew's Church (Central Falls, Rhode Island)
- St. Matthew's Church (Champlain, Virginia)
- St. Matthew's Episcopal Church (Kenosha, Wisconsin)
- St. Matthew's Churches, a mail-based ministry run by James Eugene Ewing

== See also ==
- St. Matthew's Cathedral (disambiguation)
- St. Matthew's Episcopal Church (disambiguation)
