= St. Matthew's Anglican Church =

St. Matthew's Anglican Church may refer to:

- St Matthews Anglican Church, Grovely, Queensland, Australia
- St Matthew's Anglican Church, Drayton, Queensland, Australia
- St Matthew's Anglican Church, Windsor, New South Wales, Australia
- St. Matthew's Anglican Church (Namibia)
- St. Matthew's Anglican Church (Ottawa), Canada
- St. Matthew's Anglican Church (Toronto), Canada

== See also ==
- St. Matthew's Church (disambiguation)
- St. Matthew's Episcopal Church (disambiguation)
