= Listed buildings in Haslington =

Haslington is a civil parish in Cheshire East, England. It contains 12 buildings that are recorded in the National Heritage List for England as designated listed buildings. Of these, one is listed at Grade I, the highest grade, and the others are at Grade II. The parish contains the villages of Haslington, Oakhanger and Winterley, but is otherwise rural. The listed buildings consist of two churches, two former manor houses, a former vicarage with its lodge, other houses and cottages, and a public house.

== Key ==
Grade	Criteria
I	Buildings of exceptional interest, sometimes considered to be internationally important
II	Buildings of national importance and special interest

== Buildings ==
Name and location	Photograph	Date	Notes	Grade
Haslington Hall; 53.09997°N 2.37743°W		c. 1480	A manor house, mainly timber-framed and with some later additions in brick, and with a slate roof. Originating as a hall with a cross wing, it was refaced and enlarged in the late 16th century, and in the 17th century a brick service wing was added. There were further additions in the 20th century. The house is in two storeys and has a six-bay entrance front. The outer bays project forward and are gabled, and there is a smaller gabled bay to the left of the right wing.	I
11 The Dingle; 53.10355°N 2.39492°W	—	1649	A cottage, the front and part of the gables being timber-framed with plastered brick nogging, and the rest in brick. It has an asbestos cement sheet roof. The cottage is in a single storey with an attic, and has a three-bay front. The windows are casements, those in the attic being in gabled dormers. There is a later timber-framed porch.	II
122 Crewe Road; 53.10152°N 2.39331°W	—	Late 17th century	A cottage in rendered brick with an asbestos cement roof. It is in a single storey with an attic. The windows are casements, the one in the attic being in a gabled dormer. Inside the cottage is an inglenook.	II
124 Crewe Road; 53.10167°N 2.39326°W		Late 17th century	This was originally two cottages, and later converted into a single dwelling. It is timber-framed with brick nogging, and has a thatched roof. The house is in a single storey with an attic, and has a three-bay front. There are two doorways with lattice-headed hoods, and one bow window. The other windows are casements, one of which is in a gabled dormer.	II
Haslington Manor; 53.10268°N 2.39346°W	—	Late 17th century	A former manor house in brick with a concrete tiled roof. It is in two storeys with an attic, and has a four-bay front. The doorcase has fluted pilasters and a pediment.	II
Hawk Inn; 53.10223°N 2.39370°W		Late 17th century	A timber-framed public house with rendered infill and a tiled roof. It is in a single storey with an attic, and has a two-bay front. The windows are casements, those in the upper storey in gabled dormers. Inside is an inglenook, and exposed timber-framing with wattle and daub infill.	II
St Matthew's Church; 53.10110°N 2.39328°W		1810	The chancel was added in 1909. The church is in brick with stone dressings and a slate roof. The entrance is at the west end through a pedimented porch containing a semicircular-headed doorway, a lunette window, and a clock face in the tympanum. The windows along the nave also have semicircular heads. The east window has seven lights, and contains Geometric tracery. On top of the nave is a timber louvred bell turret with an ogee-shaped cupola.	II
228 Crewe Road; 53.10880°N 2.38040°W	—	Early 19th century	A brick house on a sandstone plinth, with a tiled roof. It is in two storeys with a three-bay front. The doorway has a semicircular fanlight with intricate tracery. The windows are sashes.	II
Haslington Villa; 53.11105°N 2.36578°W	—	Early 19th century	Originally a farmhouse, it is in brick with a tiled roof. There are two storeys with an attic, and the garden front is in three bays. The outer bays contain large octagonal bay windows. The central doorway has a radial bar fanlight with a keystone carved with a leaf motif. The windows are sashes.	II
White Hall; 53.11681°N 2.37261°W	—	Early 19th century	Originating as a vicarage, it was later converted into two dwellings. It is built in rendered brick with a slate roof. The building is in two storeys with an attic. It has a front of four bays, the right bay being octagonal with a pyramidal roof. Most of the windows are sashes, apart from a gabled dormer which has decorative bargeboards, a finial and a casement window.	II
Lodge, White Hall; 53.11630°N 2.37432°W	—	Early 19th century	A brick lodge with a tiled roof, it is in a single storey, and has a two-bay front. The south gable contains bargeboards, a finial, and a window with a pointed arch containing a sash with interlaced tracery. The other windows are casement.	II
St Luke's Church, Oakhanger; 53.08752°N 2.35248°W		1870	This originated as a village school, and was later converted into a parish church. It is built in brick and has a tiled roof. The church consists of a two-bay nave, a chancel, and a porch. On the roof is a small bellcote, set diagonally. The windows have pointed arches and contain intersecting tracery.	II

== See also ==
- Listed buildings in Alsager
- Listed buildings in Barthomley
- Listed buildings in Crewe
- Listed buildings in Crewe Green
- Listed buildings in Hassall
- Listed buildings in Moston
- Listed buildings in Sandbach
