= William Hogg House =

Historic house in Massachusetts, United States

- Rice-Hogg House
- U.S. National Register of Historic Places
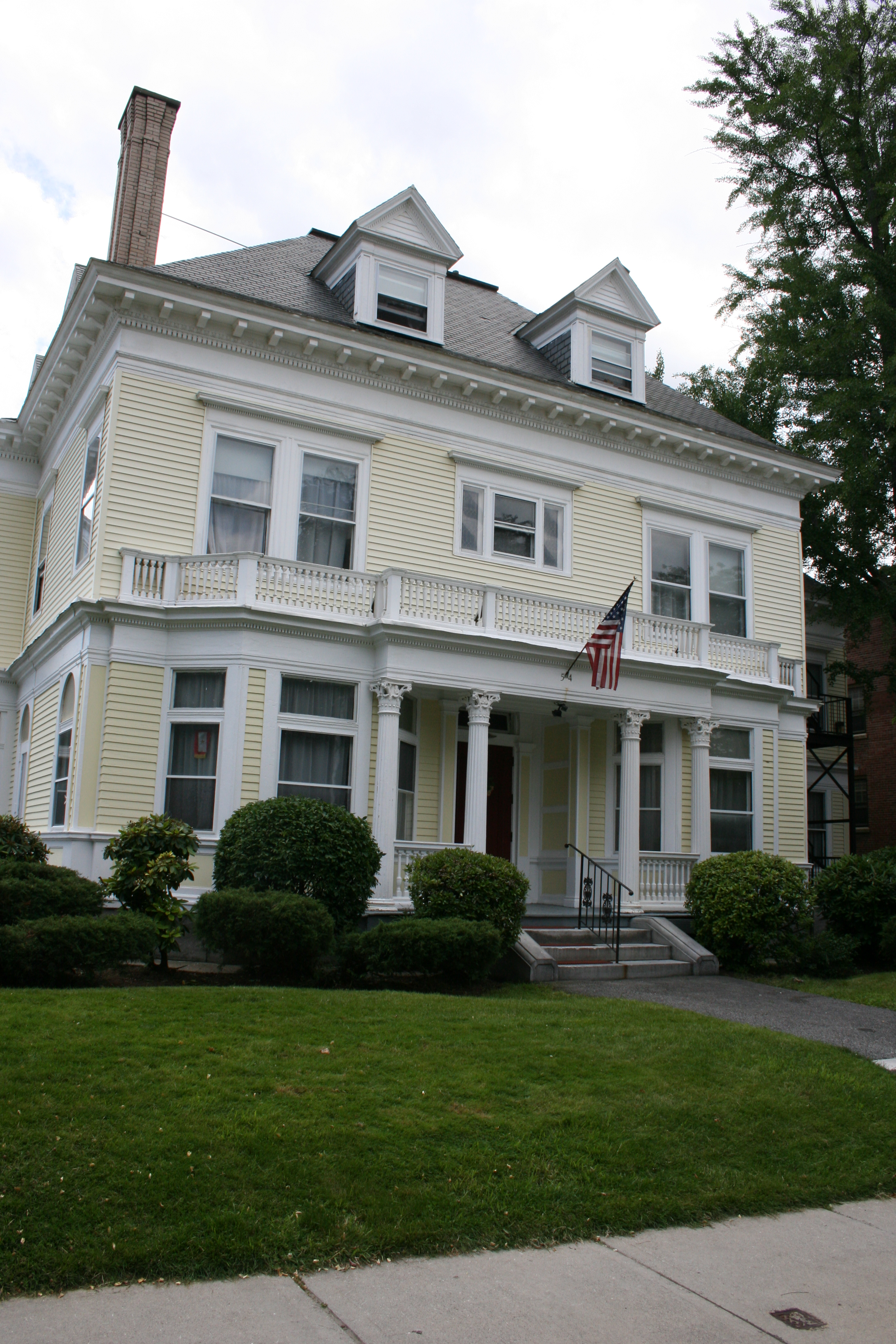

- Location within Massachusetts Location within the United States
- Location: 54 Elm St., Worcester, Massachusetts
- Coordinates: 42°15′54″N 71°48′29″W
- Area: less than one acre
- Built: 1853, 1897
- Architect: Fuller & Delano (1897)
- Architectural style: Colonial Revival
- MPS: Worcester MRA
- NRHP reference No.: 80000576
- Added to NRHP: March 05, 1980

The Rice-Hogg House is an historic house at 54 Elm Street in Worcester, Massachusetts. Built in 1853 and substantially altered in 1897, it is a prominent local example of Colonial Revival architecture. The building was added to the National Register of Historic Places in 1980.

== Description and history ==
The Rice-Hogg House is located west of downtown Worcester, at the southwest corner of Elm and Ashland Streets. It is a 2 1/2-story wood-frame structure, with a truncated hip roof and clapboarded exterior. Gabled dormers pierce the roof face, and the roof eave is decorated with modillion blocks. Its front facade has a Corinthian porch sheltering a center entry flanked by bay windows. Ground floor windows on the Ashland Street facade are topped by half round fanlight, and the upper floor windows are topped by projecting cornices.

The original Victorian house was built in 1853 by William Merrick Rice, a prominent businessman, former State Senator, and descendant of the first permanent settler of Worcester, Jonah Rice. It was significantly altered according to plans by Fuller & Delano in 1897 for William James Hogg. Hogg was the owner of the Worcester Carpet Company, one of the largest such businesses in the city (located in what are now known as the Whittall Mills). Hogg sold the family interest in the carpet business in the early 20th century, and engaged in philanthropic pursuits, serving as a director of Quinsigamond National Bank and as president of the Worcester Agricultural Society. The house was sold to Mrs. Hester Knowles in 1906 before selling to Jerome George Sr. In 1945, Becker College purchased the house for main campus classrooms/offices (Ashland Hall and then the Medical Secretarial Building) before converting it to a female dorm named Stobbs Hall from 1960-1999. After 1999, the house was used as a single-family home.

The house is colloquially known to Worcester Polytechnic Institute students as “BAM”, which stands for Big Ass Mansion.

A photo of the house appears on page 490 of the 1899 book The Worcester of eighteen hundred and ninety-eight. Fifty years a city. A graphic presentation of its institutions, industries and leaders.

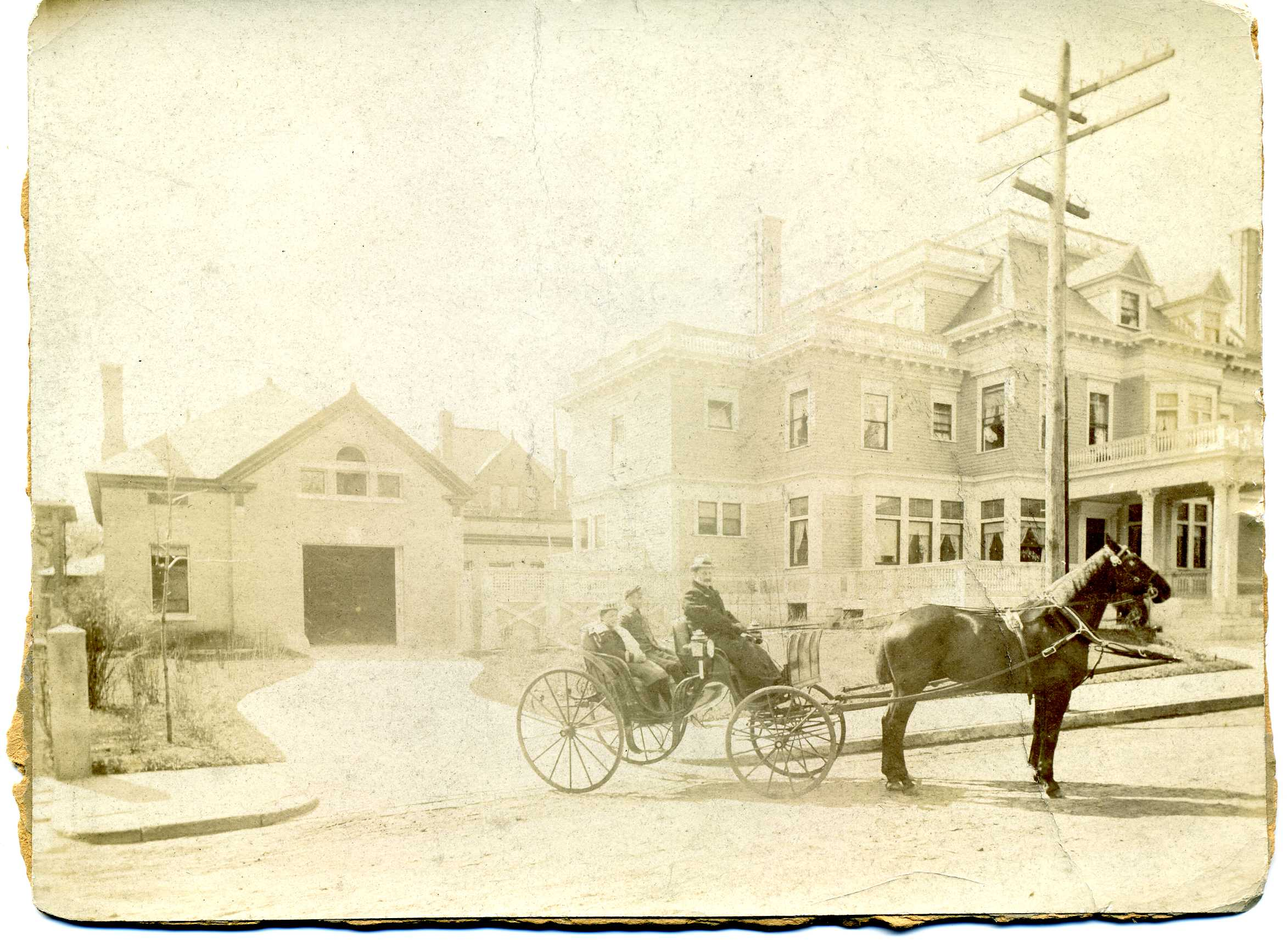
View of the house in the 1800s with the Hogg family and their Morgan horses Prince and Rip Van Winkle (as noted by Madeline Hogg)

== See also ==
- National Register of Historic Places listings in northwestern Worcester, Massachusetts
- National Register of Historic Places listings in Worcester County, Massachusetts
