= St Matthew's Church, Haslington =

Coordinates: 53.10110°N 2.39328°W

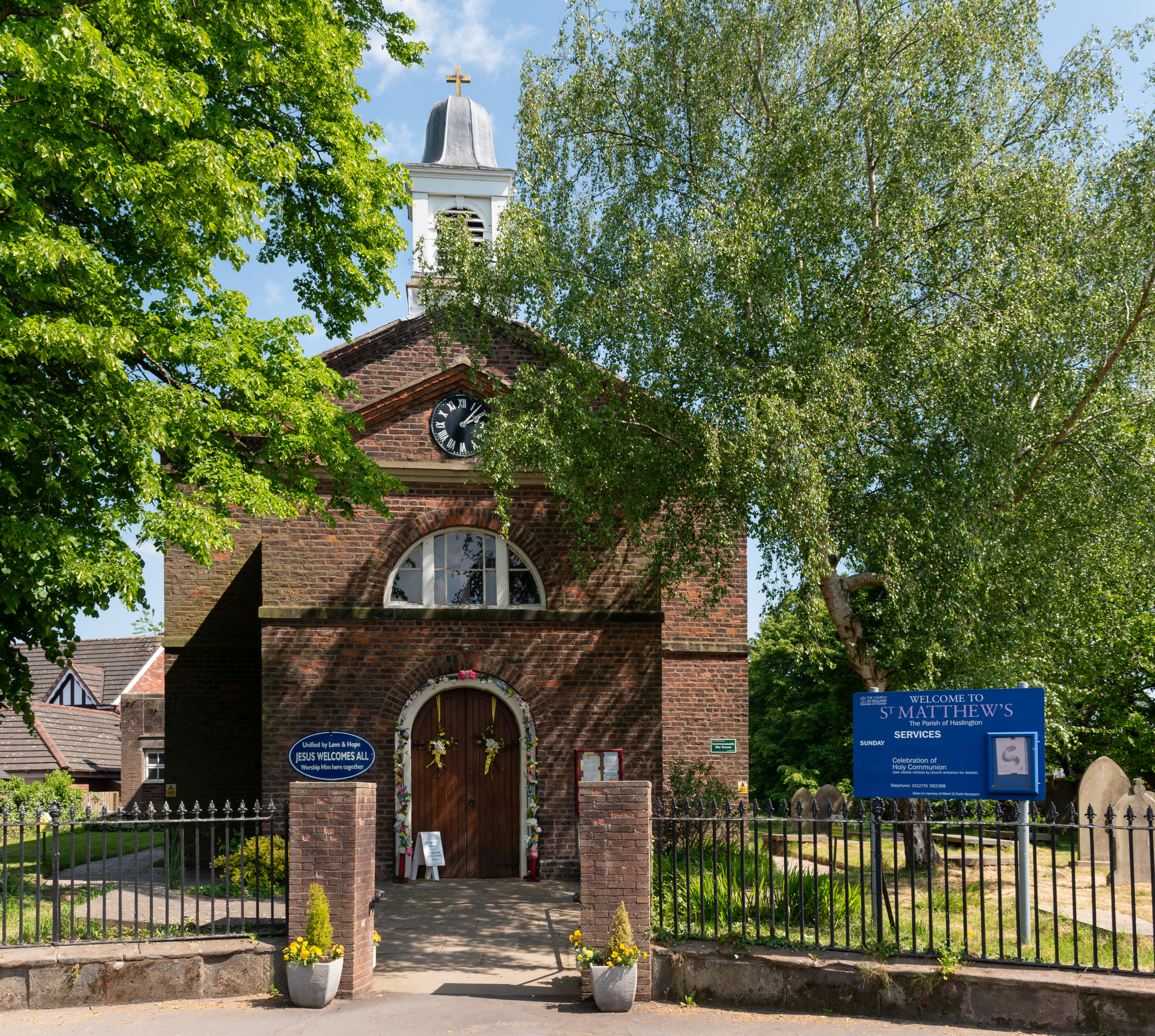
- West end of St Matthew's Church, Haslington

- Location in Cheshire
- OS grid reference: SJ 737 564
- Location: Haslington, Cheshire
- Country: England
- Denomination: Anglican
- Website: St Matthew, Haslington

History
- Status: Parish church
- Dedication: St Matthew

Architecture
- Functional status: Active
- Heritage designation: Grade II
- Designated: 12 January 1967
- Architect: Reginald T. Longden
- Architectural type: Church
- Groundbreaking: 1810
- Completed: 1909

Specifications
- Materials: Brown brick with slate roof

Administration
- Province: York
- Diocese: Chester
- Archdeaconry: Macclesfield
- Deanery: Nantwich
- Parish: Haslington

Clergy
- Vicar(s): Revd, Dr. Patricia Jane Lloyd

St Matthew's Church is in the village of Haslington, Cheshire, England. The church is recorded in the National Heritage List for England as a designated Grade II listed building. It is an active Anglican parish church in the diocese of Chester, the archdeaconry of Macclesfield and the deanery of Nantwich. Its benefice is combined with that of St Michael and All Angels, Crewe Green.

== History ==
The authors of the Buildings of England series describe this as a church of "two builds", both of which are "handsome". The west part was built in 1810. The east end was built in 1909 and was designed by Reginald T. Longden.

== Architecture ==
=== Exterior ===
The church is built in brown brick with a slate roof. Its plan consists of a three-bay nave and a chancel. The entrance is at the west end through a gabled porch. The doors are in a semicircular arched doorway above which is a lunette window, and over that is a clock face in the tympanum. On the top of the gable and slightly recessed is a timber louvred bell turret with a lead ogee cupola. The nave windows have semicircular heads. The flat-headed east window has seven lights.

=== Interior ===
The reredos is in oak and has a frieze with a grapevine motif. The carved communion rail is in Gothic style. The nave walls have wainscotting to a dado height. The organ was built in 1900 in Steele and Keay, and rebuilt in 1967 by Reeves.

== External features ==
The churchyard contains seven war graves, comprising four soldiers and two Royal Navy sailors of World War I, and a soldier of World War II.

Train driver Wally Oakes, who was posthumously awarded the George Cross for his gallantry in ensuring the safety of his passengers, is buried in the churchyard.

== See also ==
- Listed buildings in Haslington
