= Oakhanger =

Oakhanger may refer to more than one place in England:

- Oakhanger, Cheshire
- Oakhanger, Hampshire

== See also ==
- RAF Oakhanger
