= Wally Oakes =

Railwayman awarded the George Cross (1932–1965)

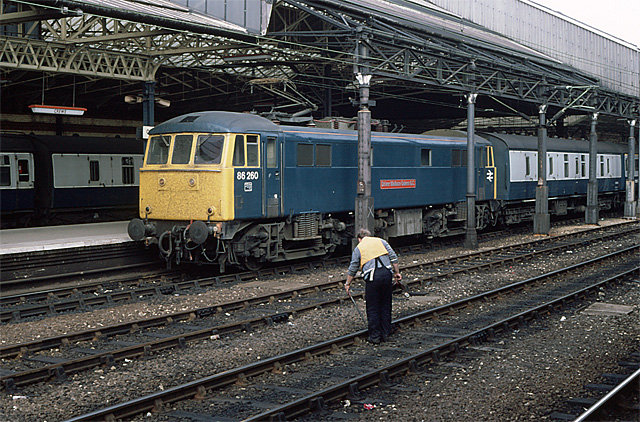
- Class 86 electric locomotive 86 260, named Driver Wallace Oakes G.C.
- Born: Wallace Arnold Oakes; 23 April 1932; Barbridge, Cheshire, United Kingdom
- Died: 12 June 1965 (aged 33); Manchester, United Kingdom
- Burial place: St Matthew's Church, Haslington, Cheshire
- Occupation: Train driver
- Known for: Preventing a train crash
- Awards: George Cross (posthumous); Carnegie Hero Trust Medal (posthumous)

Wallace Arnold Oakes GC (23 April 1932 – 12 June 1965), known as Wally Oakes, was an engine driver with British Railways who was born in Barbridge, Cheshire and lived at Wheelock Heath, Sandbach, Cheshire.

== 1965 train accident ==
On 5 June 1965, he was the driver in charge of a relief train when, about seven miles from Crewe, the fire suddenly blew back from the firebox of a BR Standard Class 7 steam locomotive No. 70051 Firth Of Forth, filling the cab with smoke and flames. Fireman Gwilym Roberts managed to climb out of the cab window and extinguish his clothing by rubbing against the plating, but Oakes stayed at the footplate to close the regulator, open the blower and apply the brake.

Roberts found his mate lying on the embankment next to the train, badly burned, but evidently having remained in the cab until the train stopped. Oakes suffered burns to approximately 80% of his body. The pain was such that he had to be suspended above his hospital bed and given large doses of morphine. A week after the accident, he died from his injuries.

Oakes was buried in an unmarked grave at St Matthew's Church, Haslington, Cheshire. On 1 February 2018, a headstone was dedicated. It had been paid for by a group of railwaymen and donors to an appeal launched by Heritage Railway magazine.

== Awards ==
For his gallantry in ensuring the safety of his passengers, Oakes was posthumously awarded the George Cross on 19 October 1965.

In February 1966 Oakes was also awarded a bronze Carnegie Hero Medal.

On 19 February 1981, Class 86 electric locomotive no. 86260 was named Driver Wallace Oakes GC. A memorial plaque in the offices above Crewe station reads:

IN COMMEMORATION OF DRIVER W A OAKES, AGED 33 YRS,

WHO THROUGH DEVOTION TO DUTY RECEIVED FATAL BURNS AT WINSFORD
WHILST WORKING THE 2/5 PM EXPRESS CREWE TO CARLISLE ENGINE No 70051
DATE 5th JUNE 1965 FROM HIS FELLOW WORKMATES CREWE MOTIVE POWER DEPT.

In September 2017, the National Railway Museum purchased Oakes's George Cross at auction for £60,000. It is displayed at the museum.

== See also ==
- John Axon - British Railways driver who died while remaining on a locomotive following a brake failure, averting a collision with a passenger train.
