= St Luke's Church, Oakhanger =

Coordinates: 53.0875°N 2.3525°W

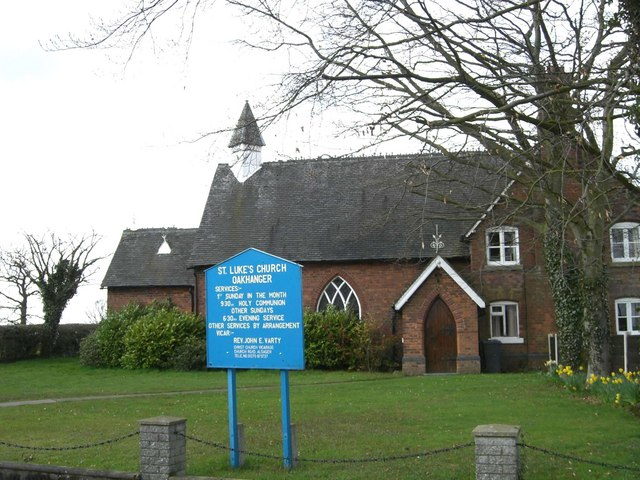
- St Luke's Church, Oakhanger

- Location in Cheshire
- OS grid reference: SJ 765 545
- Location: Church Lane, Oakhanger, Cheshire
- Country: England
- Denomination: Anglican
- Website: St Luke, Oakhanger

History
- Status: Mission church
- Dedication: Saint Luke

Architecture
- Functional status: Active
- Heritage designation: Grade II
- Designated: 14 June 1984
- Architectural type: Chapel
- Style: Gothic Revival
- Completed: 1870

Specifications
- Materials: Brick, tiled roof

Administration
- Province: York
- Diocese: Chester
- Archdeaconry: Macclesfield
- Deanery: Congleton
- Parish: Alsager

Clergy
- Vicar: Revd Toby May

St Luke's Church is in Church Lane, Oakhanger, Cheshire, England. It is an active Anglican mission church in the parish of Christ Church, Alsager, the deanery of Congleton, the archdeaconry of Macclesfield, and the diocese of Chester. The church is recorded in the National Heritage List for England as a designated Grade II listed building.

== History ==
The building was originally a school chapel with an attached master's house that was erected in 1870.

== Architecture ==
St Luke's is constructed in red brick and stands on a blue brick plinth. It is roofed with blue tiles. The plan consists of a two-bay nave, a lower and narrower chancel, and a porch. On the ridge of the roof is a bellcote, set diagonally. The windows have pointed arches and contain intersecting glazing bars. Inside the church is an oak pulpit. The altar incorporates a panel containing the figures of Faith, Hope, and Charity.

== See also ==
- Listed buildings in Haslington
