= St. Matthew's Episcopal Church (Worcester, Massachusetts) =

Historic church in Massachusetts, United States

- St. Matthews
- U.S. National Register of Historic Places
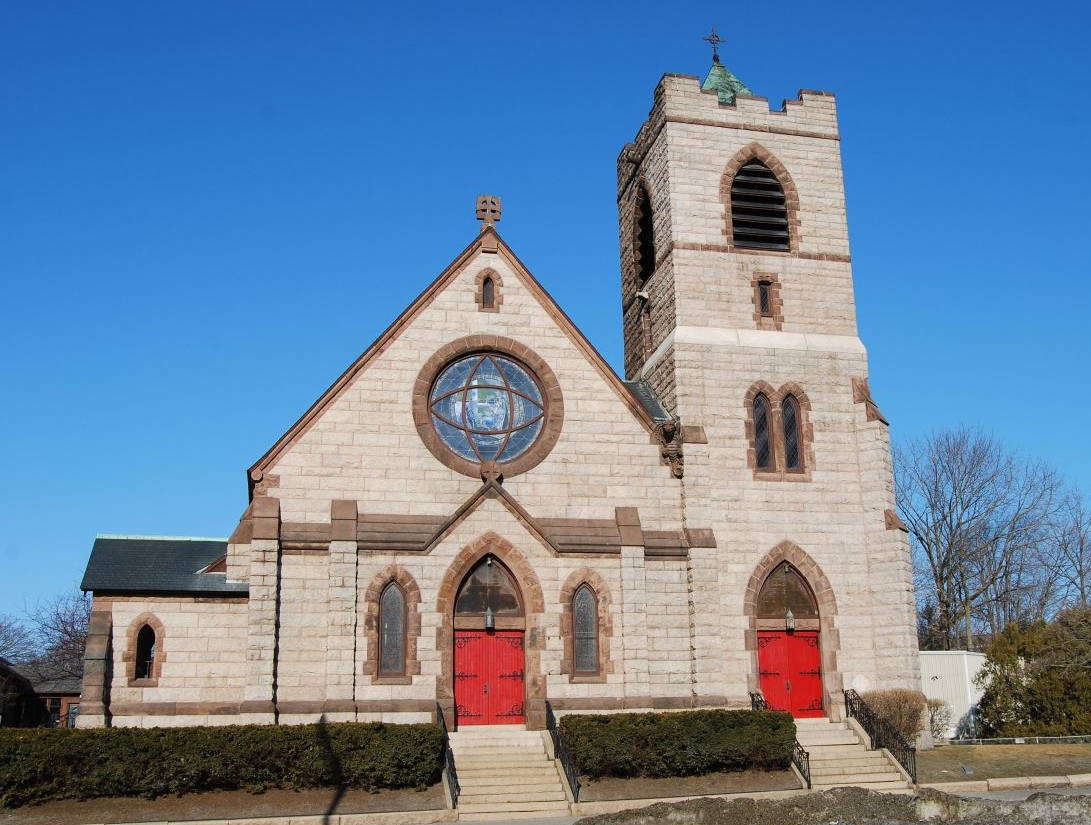

- Location within Massachusetts Location within the United States
- Location: 695 Southbridge St., Worcester, Massachusetts
- Coordinates: 42°14′35″N 71°48′44″W
- Built: 1894
- Architect: Earle & Fisher; Earle, Stephen
- Architectural style: Gothic Revival
- MPS: Worcester MRA
- NRHP reference No.: 80000485
- Added to NRHP: March 5, 1980

St. Matthew's Episcopal Church is an historic stone Episcopal church building located at 693 Southbridge Street in Worcester, Massachusetts. Designed by Stephen Earle of Earle and Fisher in the Gothic Revival style of architecture with some Romanesque details, it was built in 1894 by the Norcross Brothers. Construction of the church was funded in part by Matthew Whittall, proprietor of the Whittall Mills. It was not the first Episcopal church in Worcester: All Saints Church in the same city was founded in 1835.

On March 5, 1980, it was added to the National Register of Historic Places as St. Matthews.

== See also ==
- National Register of Historic Places listings in southwestern Worcester, Massachusetts
- National Register of Historic Places listings in Worcester County, Massachusetts
