= Hawk Inn, Haslington =

Pub in Haslington, Cheshire, England

Coordinates: 53.10223°N 2.39370°W

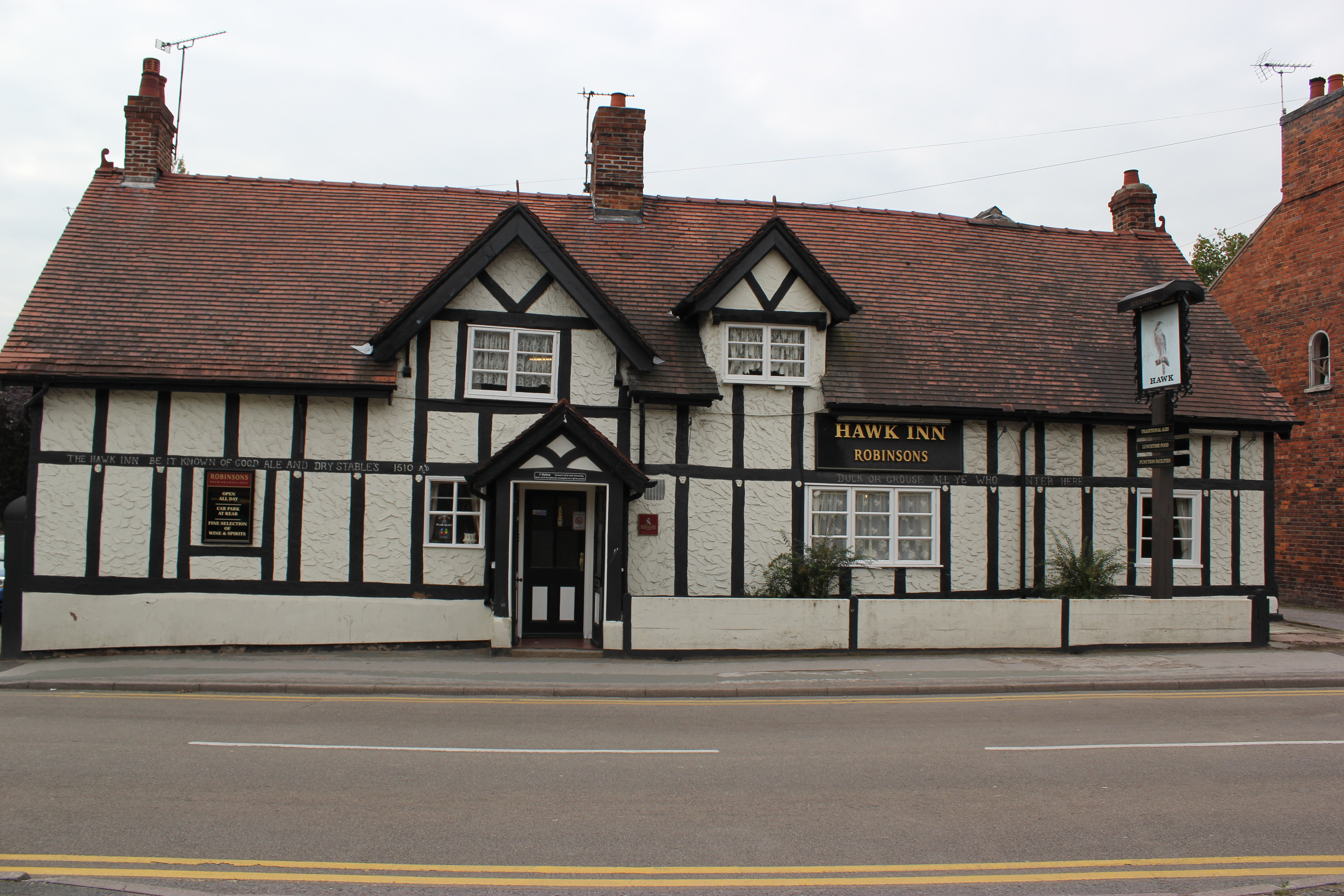
The Hawk Inn

The Hawk Inn is a Grade II listed public house at 137 Crewe Road, Haslington, Cheshire, CW1 5RG.

It is on the Campaign for Real Ale's National Inventory of Historic Pub Interiors.

It was built in the early 16th century.

== See also ==
- Listed buildings in Haslington
