= Matthew the Apostle =

Apostle of Jesus

Saint Matthew the Evangelist
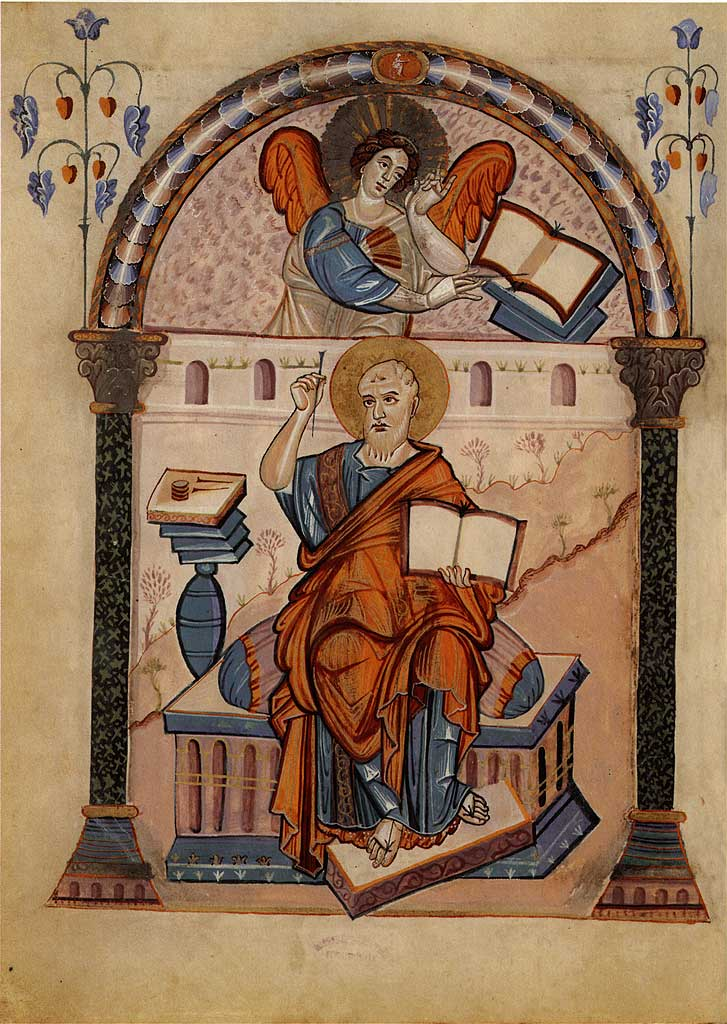
- St. Matthew the Evangelist with a winged man, Lorsch Gospels (9th century)

Apostle, Evangelist, and Martyr
- Born: First Century AD Capernaum, Galilee, Roman Empire
- Died: First Century (believed around year 68) AD; Ethiopia (Modern Day Ethiopia) or Persia (Modern Day Iran)
- Venerated in: Catholic Church; Eastern Catholic Churches; Eastern Orthodoxy; Oriental Orthodoxy; Church of the East; Anglican Communion; Lutheranism; Islam (named as one of the apostles of Jesus); Druze faith
- Canonized: Pre-Congregation
- Feast: 21 September (Western Christianity); 22 October (Coptic Orthodox); 16 November (Eastern Christianity)
- Attributes: Angel
- Patronage: Accountants; Salerno, Italy; bankers; Osorno, Chile; tax collectors; perfumers; civil servants
- Major works: Gospel of Matthew

Matthew the Apostle (Note: Biblical Hebrew: מַתִּתְיָהוּ, romanized: Mattityahu, shortened to מַתִּי, Matti (whence Arabic: مَتَّى, romanized: Mattā), meaning 'Gift of YHWH'; Imperial Aramaic: ܡܰܬ݁ܰܝ, romanized: Mattai; Koine Greek: Μαθθαῖος, romanized: Maththaîos, or Ματθαῖος, Matthaîos; Coptic: ⲙⲁⲧⲑⲉⲟⲥ, romanized: Mattheos; Latin: Matthaeus) was one of the twelve apostles of Jesus. According to many Christian traditions, he was also one of the four Evangelists as author of the Gospel of Matthew, and thus is also known as Matthew the Evangelist. The gospel, one of the three synoptics, contains the complete Sermon on the Mount and the Beatitudes.

The New Testament records that as an Apostle, he followed Jesus. Church Fathers, such as Irenaeus and Clement of Alexandria, relate that Matthew preached the gospel in Judea before going to other countries.

== In the New Testament ==
Matthew is mentioned in Matthew 9:9 and Matthew 10:3 as a tax collector (in the New International Version and other translations of the Bible) who, while sitting at the "receipt of custom" in Capernaum, was called to follow Jesus. He is also listed among the Twelve Disciples, but without identification of his background, in Mark 3:18, Luke 6:15 and Acts 1:13. In passages parallel to Matthew 9:9, both Mark 2:14 and Luke 5:27 describe Jesus's calling of the tax collector Levi, the son of Alphaeus. They do not associate it with the name Matthew, but all three passages are remarkably similar.

Since the father of both Matthew (known as Levi) and James, son of Alphaeus is named Alphaeus, according to the tradition of the Eastern Orthodox Church the two apostles were brothers.

== Ministry ==
The New Testament records that as a disciple, Matthew followed Jesus. After Jesus' ascension, the disciples withdrew to an upper room (Acts 1:10–14) (traditionally the Cenacle) in Jerusalem. The disciples remained in and about Jerusalem and proclaimed that Jesus was the promised Messiah.

In the Babylonian Talmud (Sanhedrin 43a), "Mattai" is one of five disciples of "Jeshu".

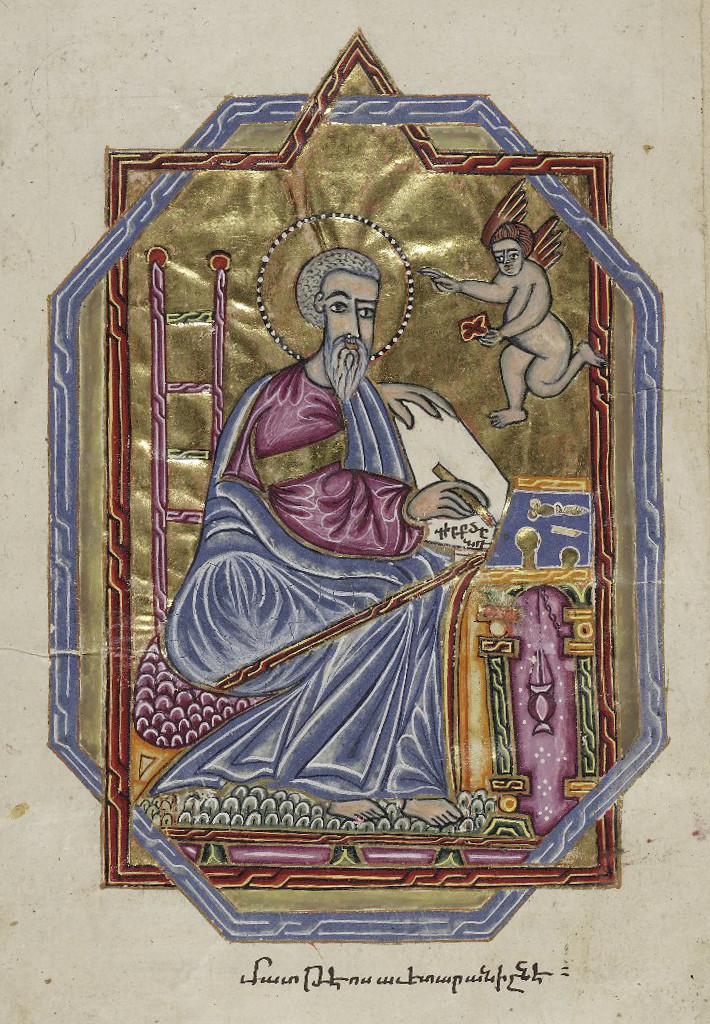
Matthew in a painted miniature from a volume of Armenian Gospels dated 1609, held by the Bodleian Library

Early Church Fathers such as Irenaeus (Against Heresies 3.1.1) and Clement of Alexandria say that Matthew preached the gospel to the Jewish community in Judea, before going to other countries. Ancient writers are not in agreement as to which other countries these are, but almost all sources mention Ethiopia. This Ethiopia is more likely to be the region south of the Caspian Sea now known as ancient Persia than the modern nation of Ethiopia in Africa. (See also Aethiopian Sea.)

The Catholic Church and the Orthodox Church each hold the tradition that Matthew died as a martyr, and the Babylonian Talmud appears to report his execution in Sanhedrin 43a.

According to some traditions, while preaching in Ethiopia, Matthew converted, and then consecrated to God, Ephigenia of Ethiopia, the virgin daughter of King Egippus. When King Hirtacus succeeded Egippus, he asked the apostle if he could persuade Ephigenia to marry him. Matthew invited King Hirtacus to liturgy the following Sunday, where he rebuked the king for lusting after the girl, as she was a nun and therefore was the bride of Christ. The enraged King thus ordered his bodyguard to kill Matthew who stood at the altar, making him a martyr.

== The Gospel of Matthew ==
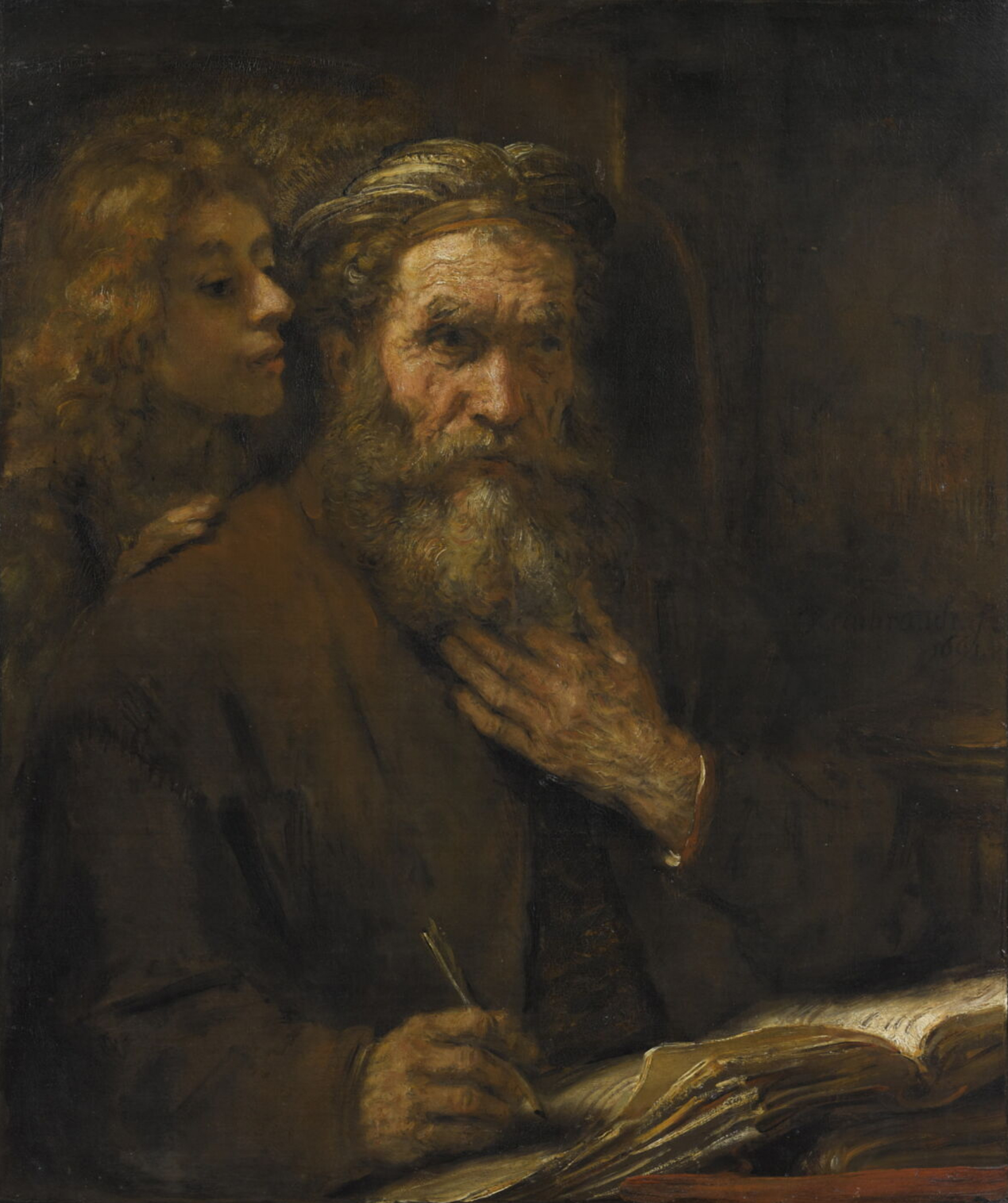
Saint Matthew and the Angel (1661) by Rembrandt

Early Church tradition holds that the Gospel of Matthew was written by the apostle Matthew. This tradition is first attested, among the extant writings of the first and second centuries, with the early Christian bishop Papias of Hierapolis (c. AD 60–163), who is cited by the Church historian Eusebius (AD 260–340), as follows: "Matthew collected the oracles [in Greek, logia: sayings of or about Jesus] in the Hebrew language [Hebraïdi dialektōi], and each one interpreted [hērmēneusen – perhaps 'translated'] them as best he could." (Note: Eusebius, "History of the Church" 3.39.14–17, c. 325 CE, Greek text 16: "ταῦτα μὲν οὖν ἱστόρηται τῷ Παπίᾳ περὶ τοῦ Μάρκου· περὶ δὲ τοῦ Ματθαῖου ταῦτ' εἴρηται· Ματθαῖος μὲν οὖν Ἑβραΐδι διαλέκτῳ τὰ λόγια συνετάξατο, ἡρμήνευσεν δ' αὐτὰ ὡς ἧν δυνατὸς ἕκαστος. Various English translations published, standard reference translation by Philip Schaff at CCEL: "[C]oncerning Matthew he [Papias] writes as follows: 'So then(963) Matthew wrote the oracles in the Hebrew language, and every one interpreted them as he was able.'(964)" Online version includes footnotes 963 and 964 by Schaff. Irenaeus of Lyons (died c. 202 CE) makes a similar comment, possibly also drawing on Papias, in his Against Heresies, Book III, Chapter 1, "Matthew also issued a written Gospel among the Hebrews in their own dialect") Likewise, early Christian theologian Origen (c. 184–c. 253) indicates that the first gospel was written by Matthew, and that his gospel was composed in Hebrew near Jerusalem for Hebrew Christians and translated into Greek. The Hebrew original was kept at the Library of Caesarea. Sometime in the late fourth or early fifth century the Nazarene Community transcribed a copy for Jerome, which he used in his work. This Gospel was called the Gospel according to the Hebrews or sometimes the Gospel of the Apostles and it was once believed that it was the original to the 'Greek Matthew' found in the Bible. However, this has been challenged by modern biblical scholars such as Bart D. Ehrman and James R. Edwards. (Note: See also the two-source hypothesis.)

Most scholars hold that the Gospel of Matthew was written anonymously, though the traditional authorship "still has its defenders”; Papias had met the Elder and the daughters of Philip the Evangelist. It is possible the gospel incorporates a source by the disciple. The author is not named within the text, and the superscription "according to Matthew" was added sometime in the second century.

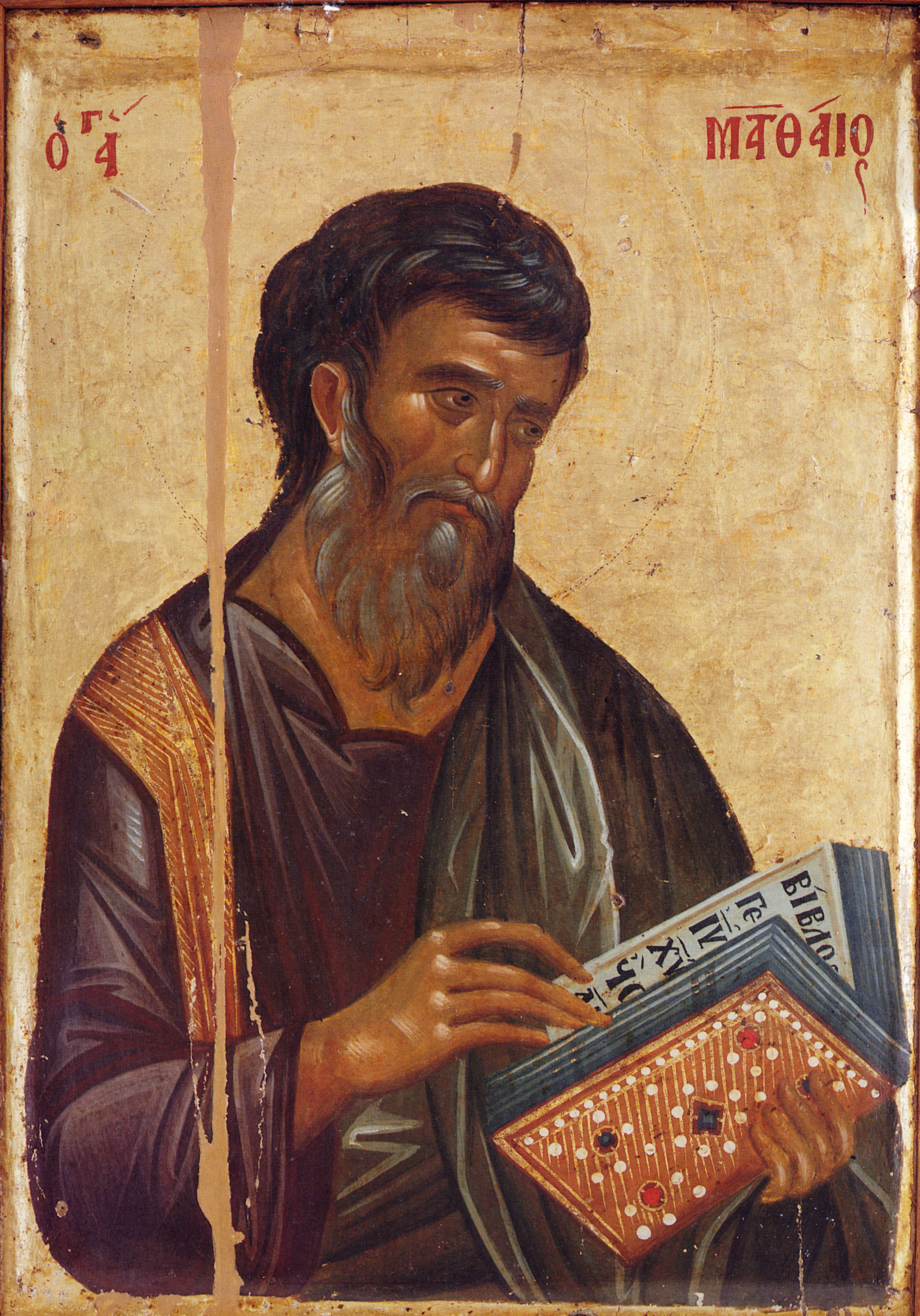
Evangelist Matthew, 14th century, Hilandar monastery, Athos, Greece

== Non-canonical or apocryphal gospels ==
In the 3rd century, Jewish–Christian gospels attributed to Matthew were used by Jewish–Christian groups such as the Nazarenes and Ebionites. Fragments of these gospels survive in quotations by Jerome, Epiphanius and others. Most academic study follows the distinction of Gospel of the Nazarenes (36 fragments), Gospel of the Ebionites (7 fragments), and Gospel of the Hebrews (7 fragments) found in Schneemelcher's New Testament Apocrypha. Critical commentators generally regard these texts as having been composed in Greek and related to Greek Matthew. Allison notes differences between Ebionites’ and Corinthian usage of Matthew 10:35 compared to the author’s intent. A minority of commentators consider them to be fragments of a lost Aramaic- or Hebrew-language original.

The Gospel of Pseudo-Matthew is a 7th-century compilation of three other texts: the Gospel of James, the Flight into Egypt, and the Infancy Gospel of Thomas.

Jerome relates that Matthew was supposed by the Nazarenes to have composed their Gospel of the Hebrews, though Irenaeus and Epiphanius of Salamis consider this simply a revised version of the canonical Gospel. This Gospel has been partially preserved in the writings of the Church Fathers, said to have been written by Matthew. Epiphanius does not make his own the claim about a Gospel of the Hebrews written by Matthew, a claim that he attributes to the Ebionites.

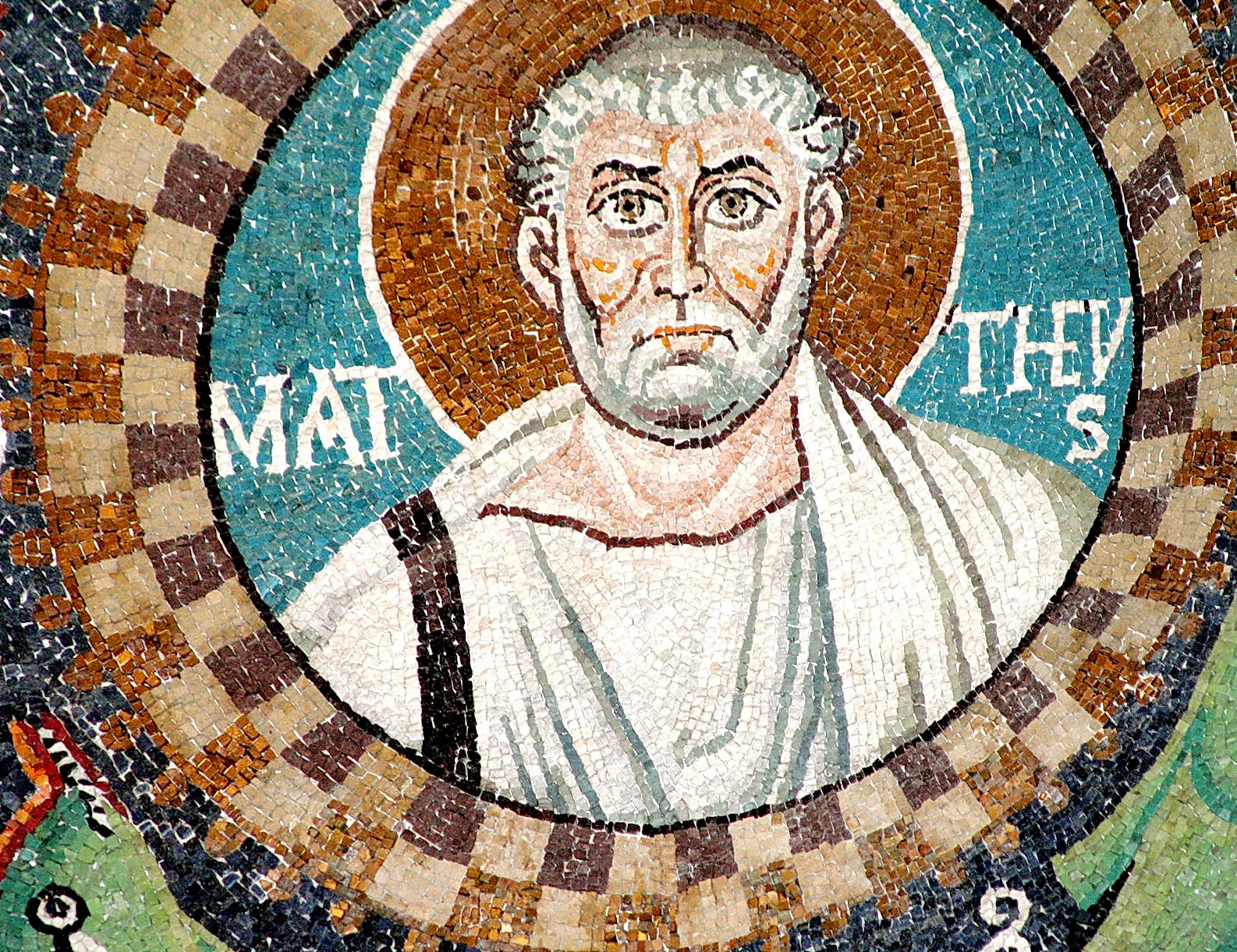
Matthew the Apostle, detail of the mosaic in the Basilica of San Vitale, Ravenna, 6th century

== Veneration ==
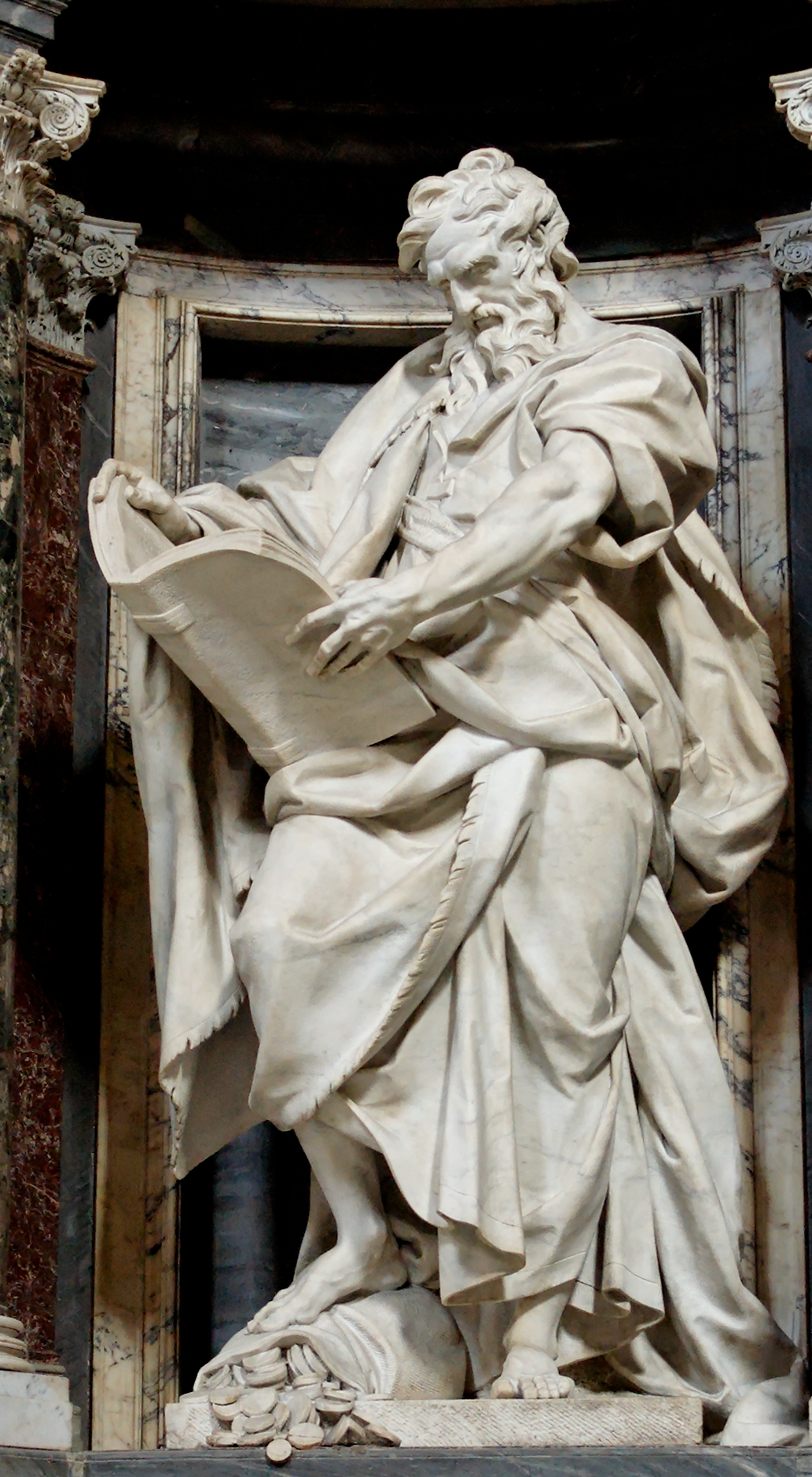
Saint Matthew by Camillo Rusconi, Archbasilica of St. John Lateran in Rome (1713–1715)

Matthew is recognized as a saint in the Roman Catholic, Eastern Orthodox, Lutheran and Anglican churches (see St. Matthew's Church). His tomb is located in the crypt of Salerno Cathedral in southern Italy. His feast day is celebrated by many western Christians on September 21, the usual date of the autumnal equinox, including in the Catholic Church, the Evangelical Lutheran Church in America, the Lutheran Church ─ Missouri Synod, and the Anglican communion The conflation of the solar points with feast days was common in early Christianity.

Matthew is venerated as a saint in the Eastern Orthodox Church with the following feast days.

- June 30 (July 13): Synaxis of the Twelve Apostles.
- November 16 (November 29): Feast Day.

=== In Christian art ===
Like the other evangelists, Matthew is often depicted in Christian art with one of the four living creatures of Revelation 4:7. The one that accompanies him is in the form of a winged man. The three paintings of Matthew by Caravaggio in the church of San Luigi dei Francesi in Rome, where he is depicted as called by Christ from his profession as a tax gatherer, are among the landmarks of Western art.

== In Islam ==
The Quran speaks of Jesus' disciples but does not mention their names, instead referring to them as "helpers to the work of Allah". Muslim exegesis and Quran commentary, however, name them and include Matthew amongst the disciples. Muslim exegesis preserves the tradition that Matthew ("Matta") and Andrew ("Andirāwas") were the two disciples who went to Ethiopia to preach the message of God.

== In the Druze faith ==
Druze tradition honors several "mentors" and "prophets", and Matthew the Apostle is honored as a prophet. In the Druze tradition and doctrine, Matthew the Apostle is respected for his contributions to spiritual knowledge and guidance. Druze doctrine teaches that Christianity is to be "esteemed and praised", as the Gospel writers are regarded as "carriers of wisdom".

The number 5 contains an unstated significance within the Druze faith; it is believed in this area that great prophets come in groups of five. In the time of the ancient Greeks, these five were represented by Pythagoras, Plato, Aristotle, Parmenides, and Empedocles. In the first century, the five were represented by Jesus Christ, John the Baptist, Saint Matthew, Saint Mark, and Saint Luke. In the time of the faith's foundation, the five were Hamza ibn Ali ibn Ahmad, Muḥammad ibn Wahb al-Qurashī, Abū'l-Khayr Salama ibn Abd al-Wahhab al-Samurri, Ismāʿīl ibn Muḥammad at-Tamīmī, and Al-Muqtana Baha'uddin.

== In architecture ==
The Basilica of Annunciation in Nazareth houses a capital that depicts Matthew the Apostle and his story regarding King Eglypus of Aethiopia and his sons. It shows how Matthew is leading them away from the demon in the far corner of the capital. The biblical story tells of Matthew converting the king and his sons to Christianity. Not only does this capital depict an act carried out by Matthew in the Bible, it foreshadows Matthew being a martyr. When Matthew the Apostle was murdered, he then became a martyr for the Christian religion as being killed for his faith and teachings given the demon in the corner of the capitol. The iconography of this capital helps understand the religion of the time period since it was just coming into Christendom. This shows the cross between Ethiopia and Nazareth as these are where the capitals are today.

== In fiction ==
- The Master and Margarita

== Gallery ==
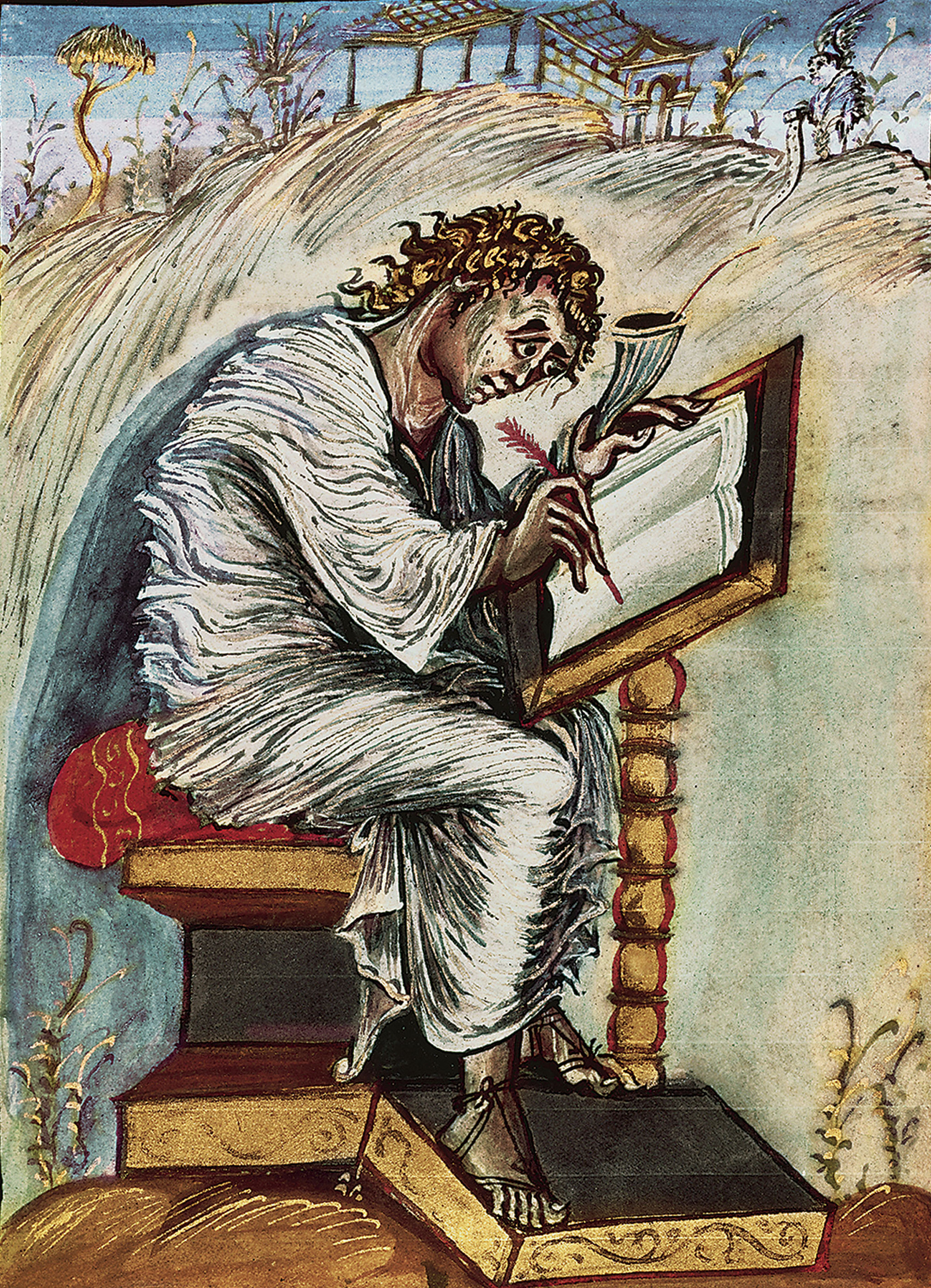
Saint Matthew in the Ebbo Gospels

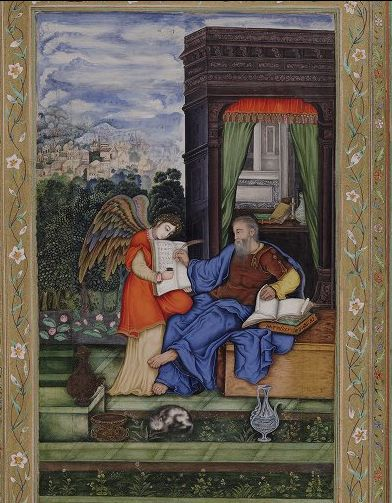
Saint Matthew writing the Gospel with an angel holding the volume, an Islamic miniature c. 1530 by Kesu Das for the Mughal king

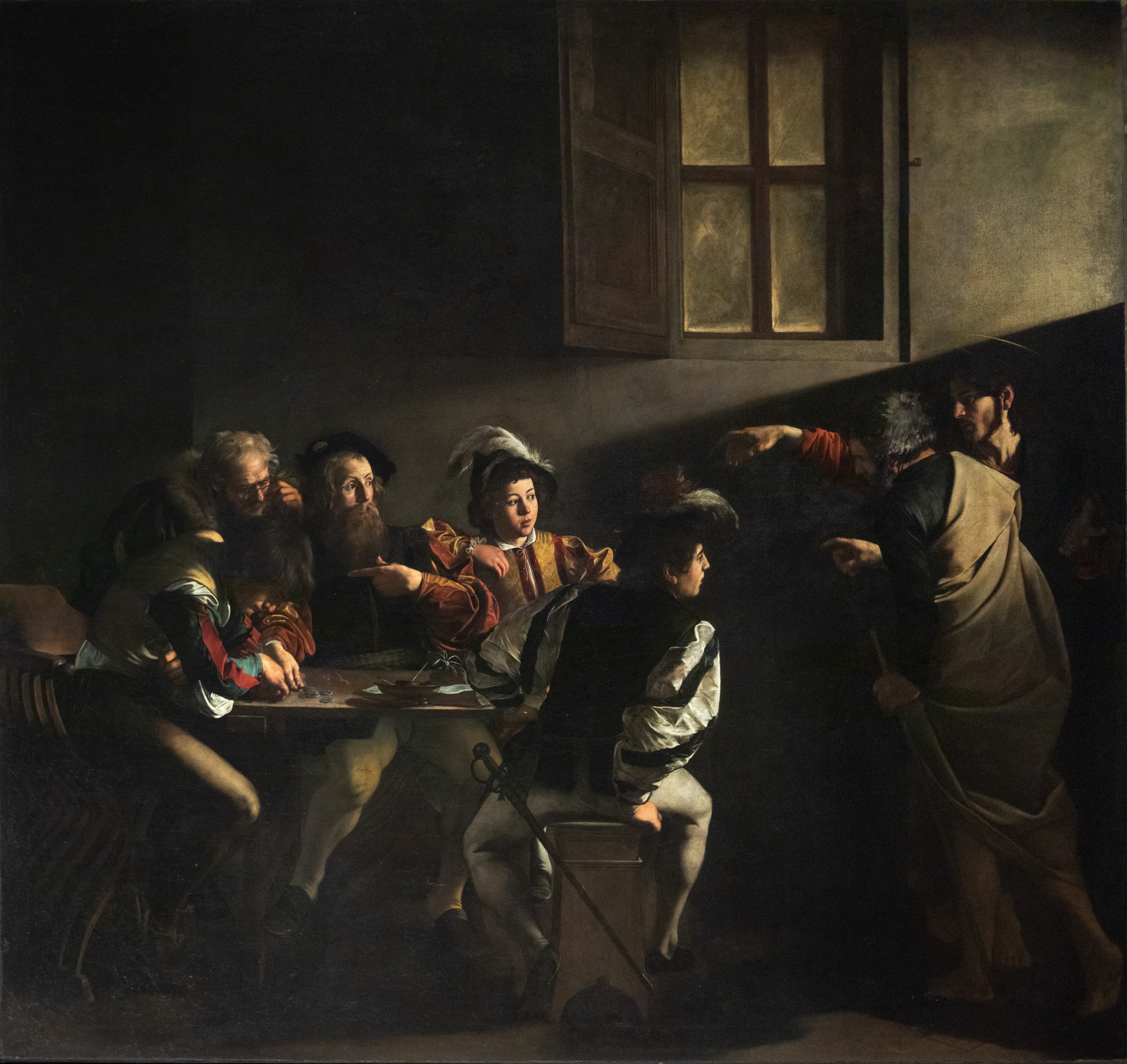
The Calling of Saint Matthew, 1599–1600, Caravaggio

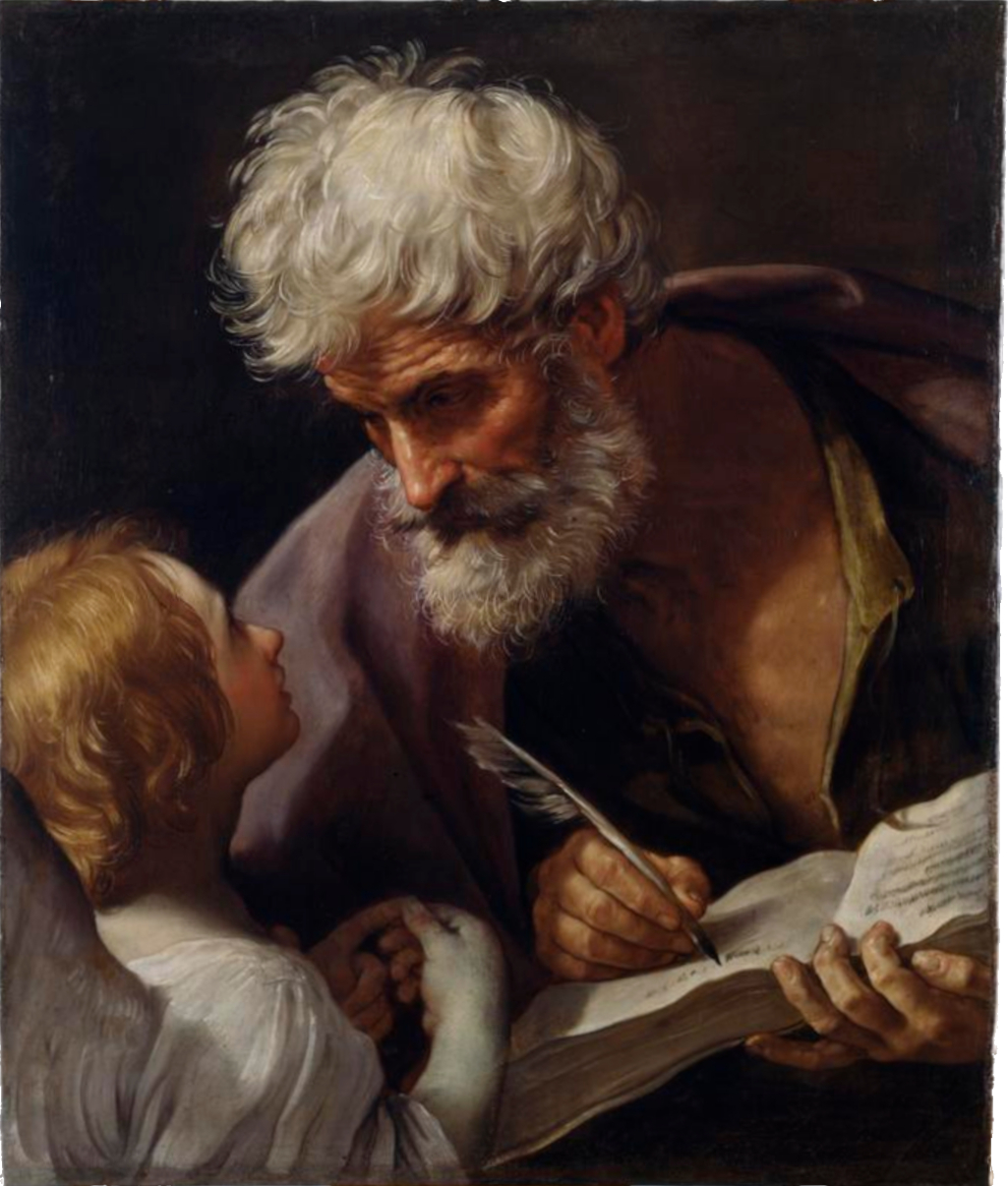
Saint Matthew and the Angel by Guido Reni, 1620–1630

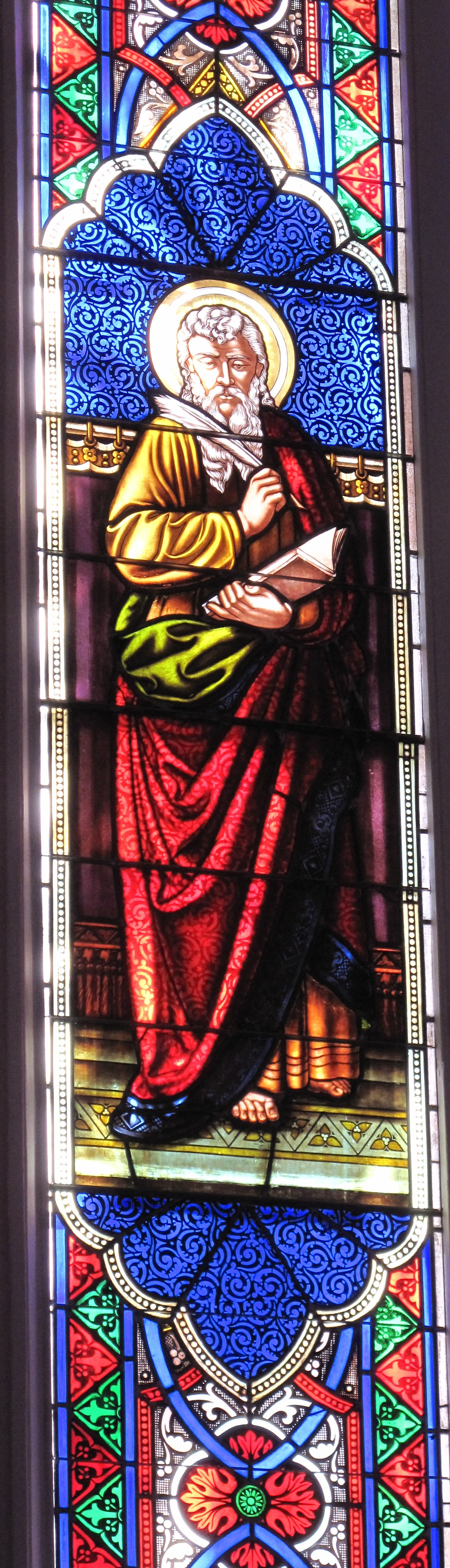
Stained-glass depiction of Saint Matthew at St. Matthew's German Evangelical Lutheran Church in Charleston, South Carolina

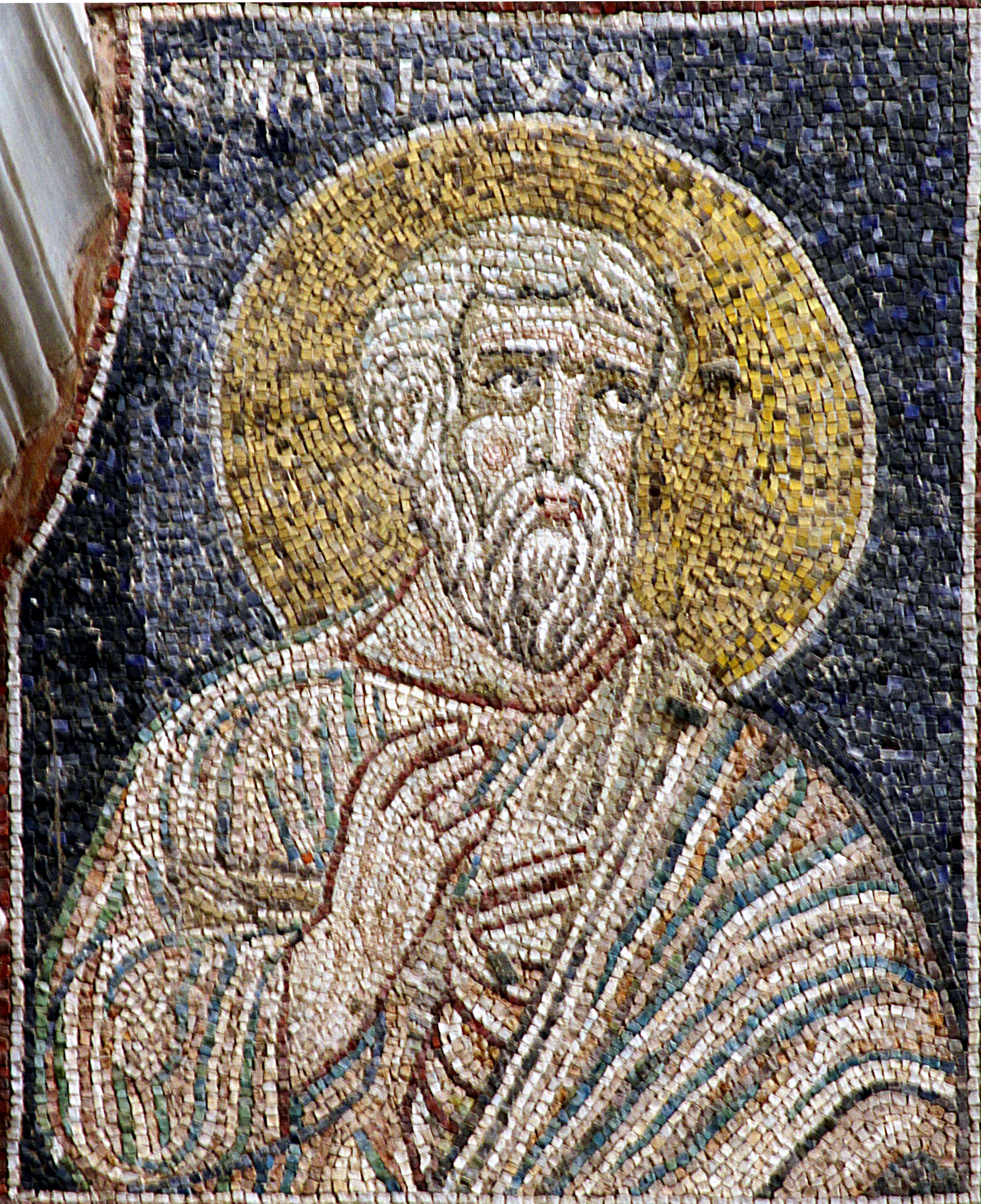
Icon of Saint Matthew in the Basilica of Saint Apollinaris, Ravenna

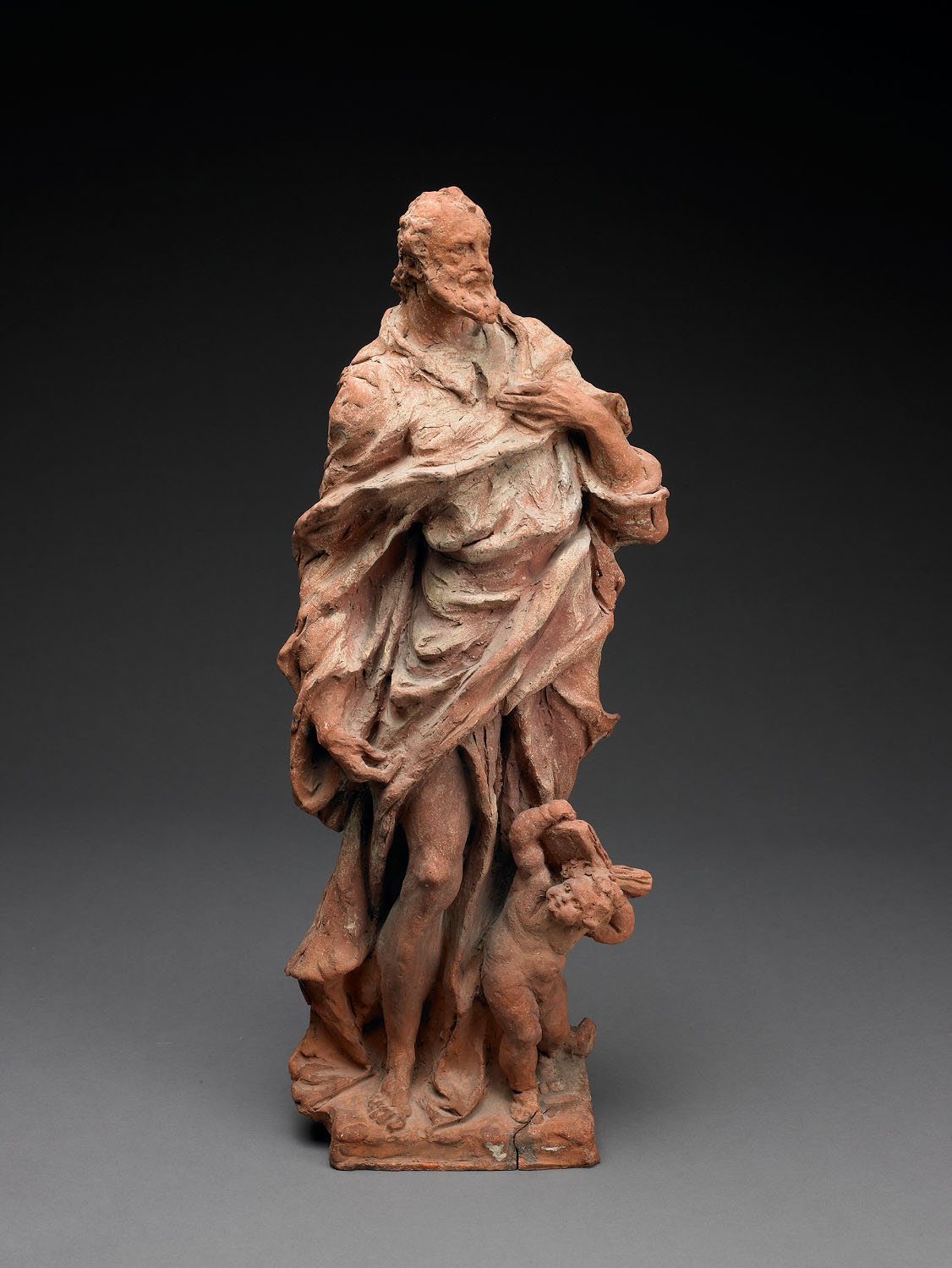
A terracotta sculptural model, Giuseppe Bernardi

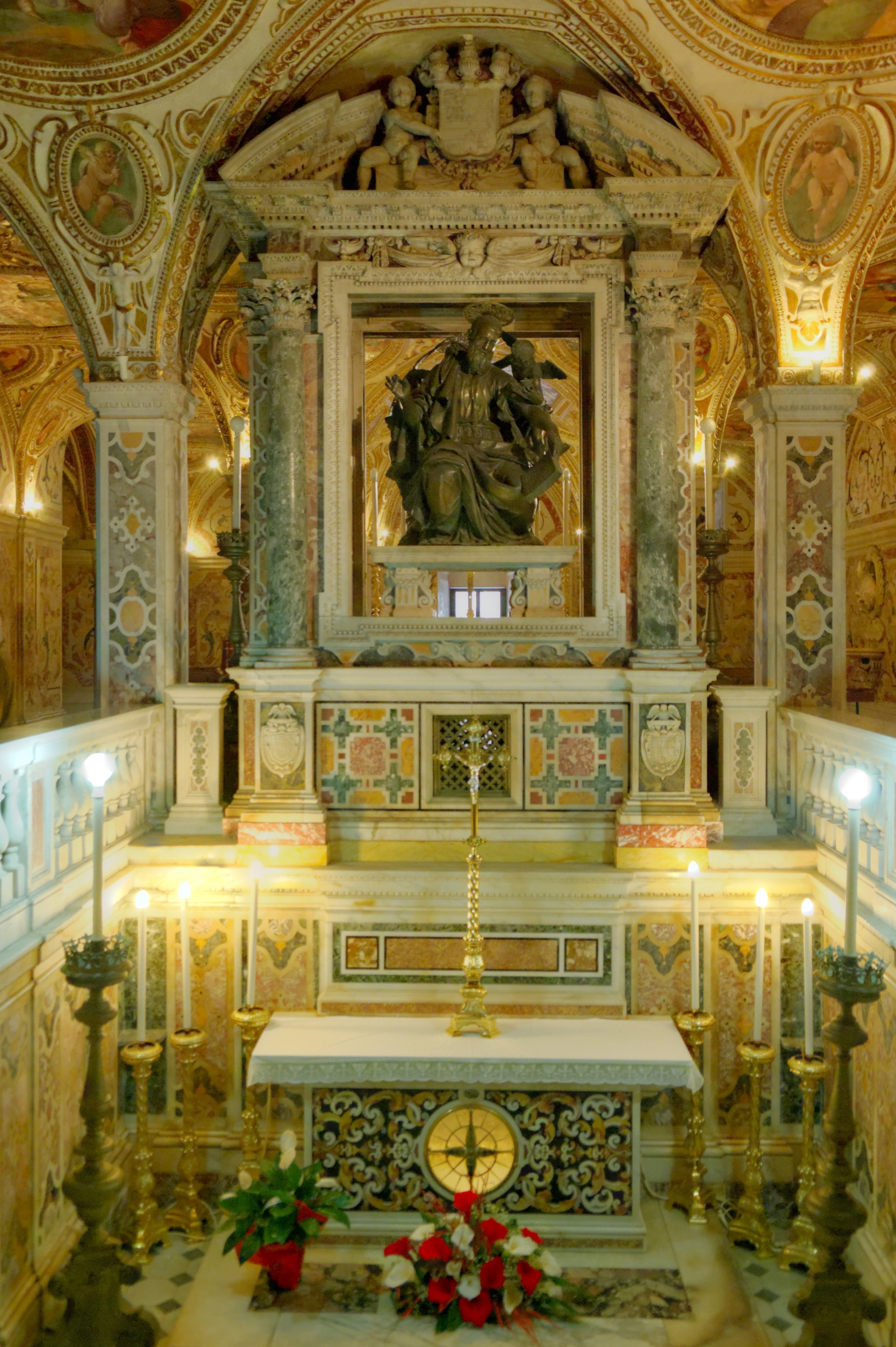
The Crypt at Salerno Cathedral

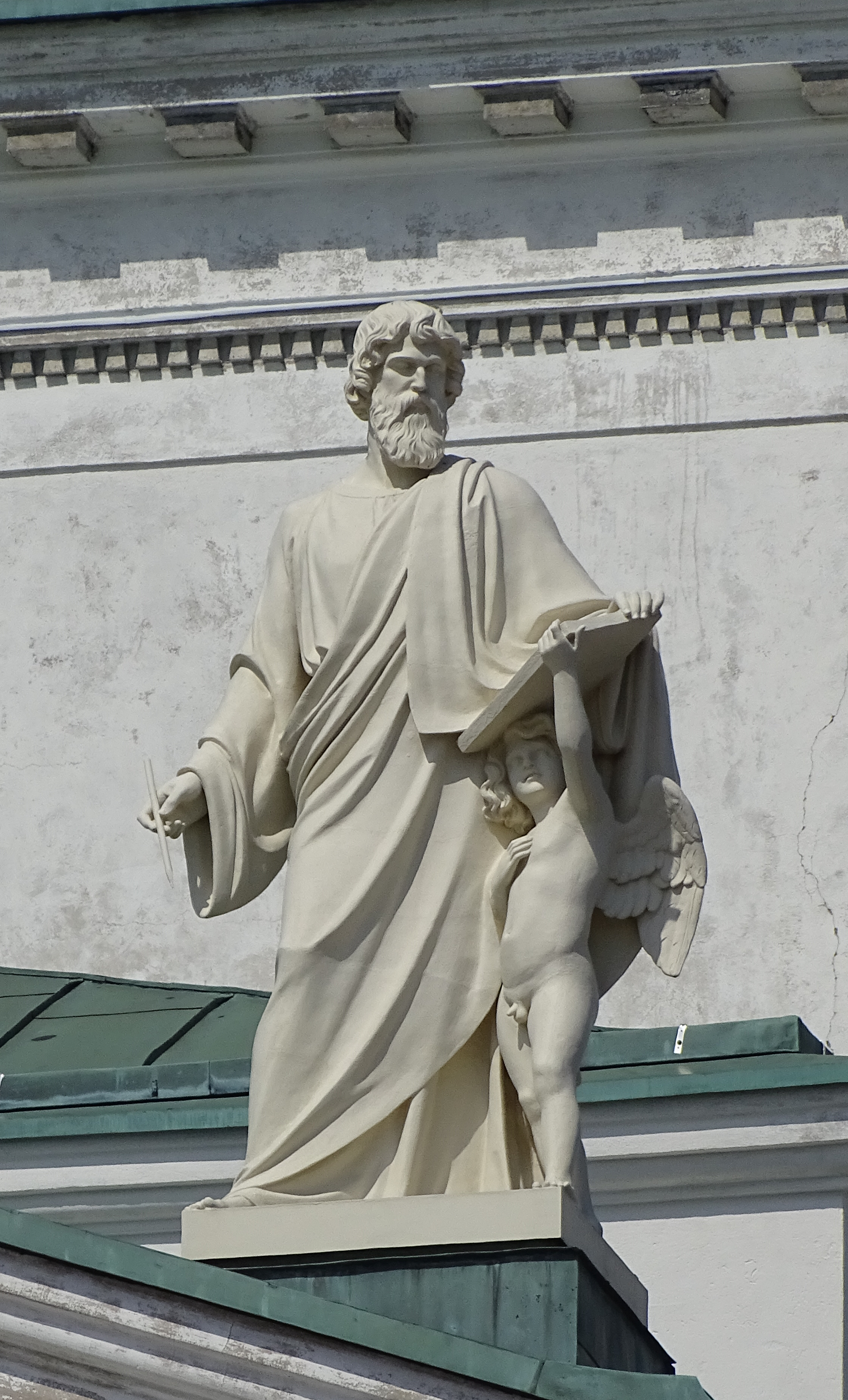
Statue of Saint Matthew by August Wredow at the roof of the Helsinki Cathedral

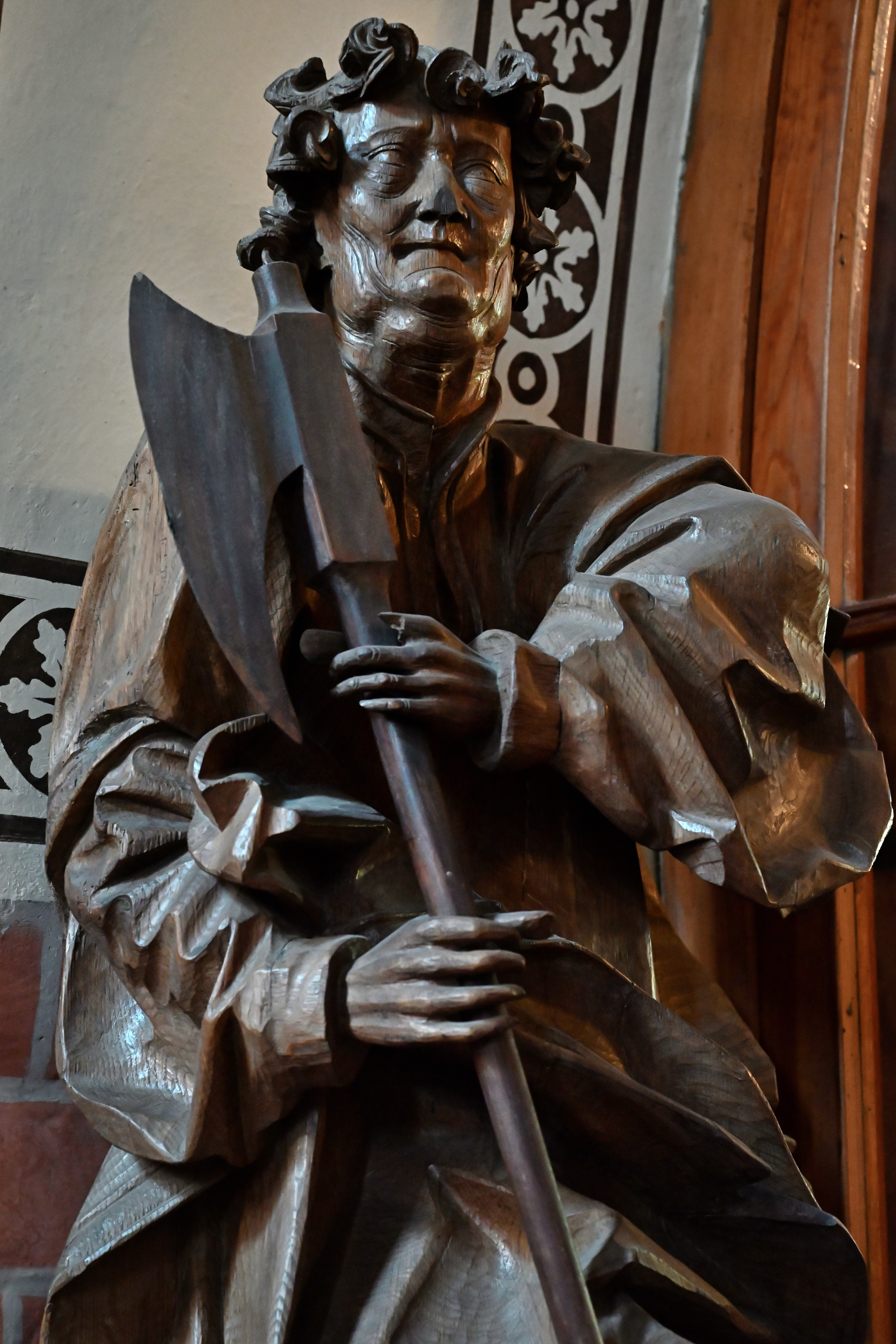
Matthew with the hatchet from Claus Berg (Güstrow Cathedral)

== See also ==
- Mark the Evangelist
- Luke the Evangelist
- John the Apostle
- Saint Matthew the Apostle, patron saint archive

Matthew the Apostle Calling of Matthew; Life of Jesus: Ministry Events
Preceded by Hometown Rejection of Jesus, "Physician, heal thyself"	New Testament; Events	Succeeded by New Wine into Old Wineskins
