= Haslington Hall =

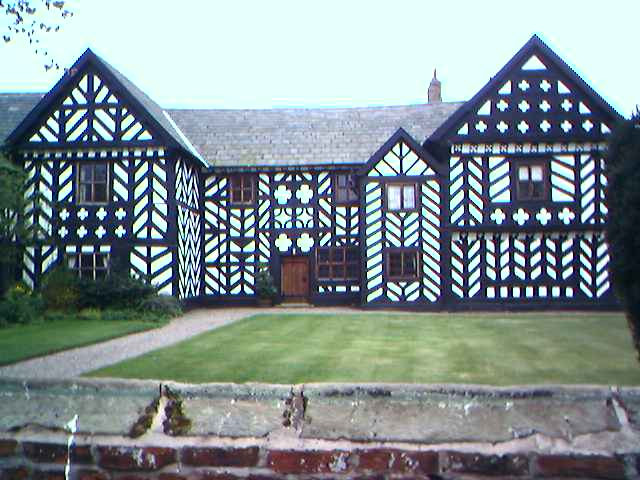
- Haslington Hall

- Location in Cheshire
- 53.09997°N 2.37743°W
- Location: Haslington, Cheshire, England
- OS grid reference: SJ 748 560

History
- Built: 1545
- Built for: Admiral Sir Francis Vernon

Listed Building – Grade I
- Designated: 10 June 1952
- Reference no.: 1136283

Haslington Hall is a country house located in open countryside 1 km east of the village of Haslington, Cheshire, England. It is recorded in the National Heritage List for England as a designated Grade I listed building.

== Early history ==
It is difficult to trace the early history of the hall, because all early documents relating to the hall were kept in a bank vault in Manchester that was destroyed in 1940 during World War II bombing.

The manor of Haslington was acquired by the Vernon family as a consequence of the 14th-century marriage of Sir Thomas Vernon to Joan Lostock, heiress of Haslington. The house was built by Admiral Sir Francis Vernon in 1545, and contains parts of the original medieval manor house, which are said to date back to 1480. Additions and alterations were made to it in the 16th, 17th and 19th centuries. It is claimed that some of the timbers used in the early phase of construction were salvaged from ships of the Spanish Armada in 1588. In the late 19th century it was a farmhouse. In 1931 extensive repairs, alterations and additions were made.

== Architecture ==
The house is built partly in timber framing and partly in brick, with a slate roof. It has two storeys and six bays. The timber-framed areas are decorated with herringbone bracing, quatrefoils and cusped concave-sided lozenges. The rear elevation is mainly in brickwork.

== Recent history ==
Previous residents include Colonel H Watts and Mrs Lillian Watts. Mrs Watts was the first president of the Haslington and Crewe Green branch of the Women's Institute, founded in 1944. Confusion has arisen in several publications with Mrs Madge Watt, a Canadian lady who founded the Women's Institute in Britain in 1915; she returned to Canada in 1919 and is unlikely ever to have visited Haslington.

After the first World War Air Commodore Dame Felicity Peake, the first director of the Women's Royal Air Force and the daughter of Colonel H Watts, spent much of her youth in the house. The house was bought in 1970 by the millionaire Tony Vernon who established Murray Vernon, one of the largest independent dairy companies in the country. He restored the house over the next thirty years. Following his death in 2005, the house was sold for £3m to Mohammed Isaq.

In 2014 the fire service visited a structure in the grounds of Haslington Hall known as The Big Marquee and found "serious" breaches in fire safety. The service issued a prohibition notice, which meant the company should immediately stop using the venue, which was ignored by Isaq on at least three occasions when firefighters visited the venue and weddings were taking place. Isaq had a previous conviction for fire safety breaches when in January 2012 he was fined and ordered to pay court costs totalling £23,815 to Cheshire Fire and Rescue Service for nine serious breaches of the Regulatory Reform (Fire Safety) Order 2005, also at Haslington Hall. The honorary Recorder of Chester, Judge Roger Dutton, told Raja that the breaches were "flagrant" and put the public at risk.

On the morning of 24 March 2018 firefighters from across the area were called to a fire at Haslington Hall. In April 2018 Cheshire Police were said to be investigating the fire, the cause of which is yet to be determined. In June 2018, Mohammed Isaq, 56, of Hale Barns, pleaded guilty to nine charges relating to his failure to comply with the Regulatory Reform Fire Safety Order 2005, and his failure to comply with an enforcement notice and failure to comply with a prohibition notice at his Haslington Hall. He was jailed for 20 months at Chester Crown Court for breaching serious fire safety rules. His company, Haslington Hall Ltd, where he was the major shareholder, also admitted the same breaches. The charges related to his failure to take general fire precautions to ensure the safety of employees and the public, placing them at risk of death and serious injury in case of fire.

In December 2019 the hall and estate was sold in a derelict state to retired property developer Peter Jans, who restored the building into a private dwelling and used it as his own home. Haslington Hall was put on the market for £800,000 in 2023 when Jans' children grew up and left home.

== See also ==
- Grade I listed buildings in Cheshire East
- Listed buildings in Haslington
