= St Matthew's Church, Newbottle =

Grade II Listed Church in Tyne and Wear, England

Coordinates: 54°51′28″N 1°28′20″W

St. Matthew's Church
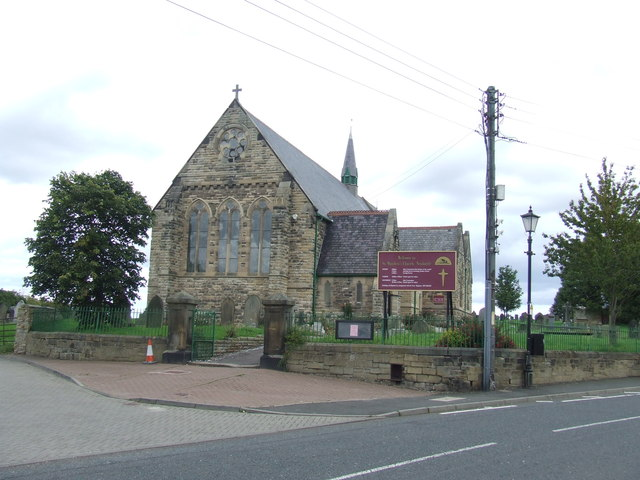
- St Matthew's Church in 2011

General information
- Type: Church
- Location: Newbottle, Tyne and Wear, England
- Construction started: 1 May 1885
- Completed: 1886 (current)

Listed Building – Grade II
- Official name: Church of St Matthew
- Designated: 15 July 1985
- Reference no.: 1184890

St Matthew's Church is a church in Newbottle, Tyne and Wear in the City of Sunderland Metropolitan Borough. It is a Grade II listed building.

== About ==
St Matthew's Church historically served the areas of Newbottle and Philadelphia. The church falls within the Diocese of Durham.

== History ==
On the site of the current church was originally a chapel named St Matthew's Chapel of Ease, that was constructed in October 1850 on land given by the Earl of Durham. The chapel was demolished in 1885.

The new and current church had its stone laid on 1 May 1885 by Joseph Barber Lightfoot, Bishop of Durham, and was completed by 1886.

On 15 July 1985, St Matthew's Church became Grade II listed.

=== List of Vicars ===
- Rev. Alfred J. Blagden (1865–1886)
- Rev. Douglas Samuel Boutflower (1886–1896)
- Rev. Edwin John Day (1896–1917)
- Rev. Samuel T. Watts (1917–1925)
- Rev. Charles J. Lockyer (1925–1936)
- Rev. Robert W. Bruce Richards (1936–1945)
- Rev. Robert Burt (1945–1962)
- Rev. C. Charlton (1962–1967)
- Rev. Michael Bates (1967–1975)
- Rev. Ray Skinner (1976–1987)
- Rev. Stephen Taylor (1987–1992)
- Rev.Edward Wilkinson (1992–Present)
