= Haslington =

Village in Cheshire, England

Coordinates: 53.099°N 2.398°W

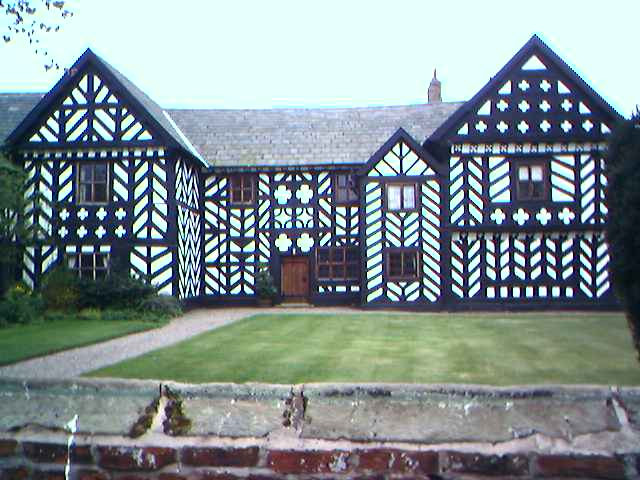
- Haslington Hall

- Location within Cheshire
- Population: 6,536 (2011 Census)
- OS grid reference: SJ734558
- Civil parish: Haslington
- Unitary authority: Cheshire East
- Ceremonial county: Cheshire
- Region: North West
- Country: England
- Sovereign state: United Kingdom
- Post town: Crewe
- Postcode district: CW1
- Dialling code: 01270
- Police: Cheshire
- Fire: Cheshire
- Ambulance: North West
- UK Parliament: Crewe and Nantwich
- Website: http://www.haslington.org

Haslington is a village and civil parish in the unitary authority of Cheshire East and the ceremonial county of Cheshire, England. It lies about 2 miles (3.2 km) north-east of the much larger railway town of Crewe and approximately 4 miles (6.4 km) south of Sandbach. The village was originally bisected by the A534 road that links Crewe with Sandbach, however, this road has now been re-routed to bypass the village to the north-west. The village is also a close neighbour to a number of small towns and villages (including Alsager, Wheelock, Winterley), and is approximately 6 miles (9.7 km) from the Elizabethan market town of Nantwich. The village lies approximately 11 miles (18 km) north-west of the Staffordshire Potteries .

== History ==
Haslington is not mentioned in the Domesday Book of 1086, so it is presumed that either the village came into existence afterwards, or was insignificantly small. The earliest mention of Haslington is in 1256, when it was called "Hesinglinton". The name is possibly derived from the phrase "tun among hazels", or "enclosure amongst hazel trees". Often, with settlement names ending with "tun" or "ton", such as Haslington, this indicates origins of a farm enclosed with a moat or fence. Later variations of the name were 'Halinton'; (1292, 1536), "Hasillinton" (1280), "Haselin(g)ton(e)" (1293 to 1586) and "Hass(e)lyn(g)ton" (1307 to 1432). Alternatively it has been suggested the Haslington's name derives from Thomas de Heslynton, an archer in the King's Bodyguard and a resident of Haslington, however this version of events is often discredited due to de Heslynton's life being after the earliest mentions of the village.

In the reign of Edward I, the Barony of Wich-Malbank (now known as Nantwich) was divided up between the heirs of the last Baron who held that title, William. Haslington was given to Auda Vernon of Shipbrooke, whose descendants included the founder and early residents of Haslington Hall.

During the First English Civil War, on 27 December 1642,(?) there was a skirmish between the Royalists and the Parliamentarians that took place on the southern outskirts of the village at a place called Slaughter Hill. The Parliamentarians—also known as the Roundheads—won the battle. Local legend says the battle caused the brook nearby to turn red from the blood spilt. A sword was found embedded in the bank of Valley Brook. Although the macabre name Slaughter Hill suggests it may be named after this skirmish, it may be a corruption of "Sloe Tree Hill". Blackthorn (Prunus spinosa), the fruit of which are sloes, can still be found in the hedgerows down the lane named Slaughter Hill, which adjoins with the neighbouring civil parish of Crewe Green.

== Governance ==
Haslington was originally a chapelry within the ancient parish of Barthomley. It was made a separate civil parish in 1866. The parish council has 15 councillors, split between three parish wards: Haslington, Winterley, and Oakhanger. Haslington is the largest of the three wards.

From 1974 the civil parish was served by Crewe and Nantwich Borough Council, which was succeeded on 1 April 2009 by the new unitary authority of Cheshire East. Haslington falls in the parliamentary constituency of Crewe and Nantwich, which was represented by Labour MP Laura Smith. Smith defeated Conservative MP Edward Timpson in the 2017 general election. Timpson had previously represented the constituency since a by-election in May 2008, following the death of Labour MP Gwyneth Dunwoody. The seat was won by Conservative Kieran Mullan in 2019.

== Geography ==
The area around Haslington is primarily arable land, though also some dairy farms. The land to the east in Oakhanger consists of peat, whereas in the west, clay. There are two main areas of peat: White Moss and Oakhanger Moss, the latter of which being a Site of Special Scientific Interest. The parish of Haslington features 110 miles of hedges, 10,000 trees and 60 public paths. There was an original Haslington Hall that pre-dated the current one, built around 1220, that was moated. The moat and Hall gradually crumbled away and became a mere, which was only filled in the 20th century. The mere was near what is now Mere Street, off Crewe Road. The nearby village of Winterley, within Haslington's parish, is home to Winterley Pool, a modest lake by the roadside of Crewe Road.

Areas of land within Haslington, and also nearby Crewe Green and Crewe, are owned by the Duchy of Lancaster. The Duchy of Lancaster is a royal duchy, which provides income to the monarch; the Duke of Lancaster is Charles III.

Haslington is situated 2 miles (3.2 km) north-east of Crewe, and 4 miles (6.4 km) south of Sandbach. The route from Crewe to Sandbach used to be straight through the village, until the construction of a bypass (A534) to the north west of the village. Transport links in the form of bus routes connect the village from Crewe to Northwich, Macclesfield and Hanley all passing through the village. Haslington's close proximity to Crewe also means residents have access to Crewe railway station, which has frequent train services to cities such as Manchester and London. Additionally, Haslington is relatively close to the M6 motorway, with junctions 16 and 17 serving Crewe and Sandbach, respectively. A small section of the motorway does actually pass through a sparsely populated area of the parish to the far east by its border. With its various transport links available, Haslington can be considered a dormitory village.

== Demography ==
Haslington has undergone a large, rapid expansion over the last 25 years, thanks to the redevelopment of Crewe. The 2011 UK census gives the population as being 6,536, of which 3,164 are male, and 3,372 are female. They are living in 2,706 households. Cheshire East data download for July 2022 provides updated figures for a population of 8000 and 3480 households. Historically, the population was as given the following table:

Historical Population Figures for Haslington
| Year | 1801 | 1851 | 1901 | 1951 | 2001 | 2011 |
|---|---|---|---|---|---|---|
| Population | 667 | 1153 | 1791 | 3223 | 6430 | 6536 |

(source: UK and Ireland Genealogy Site and 2011 Census)

== Landmarks ==
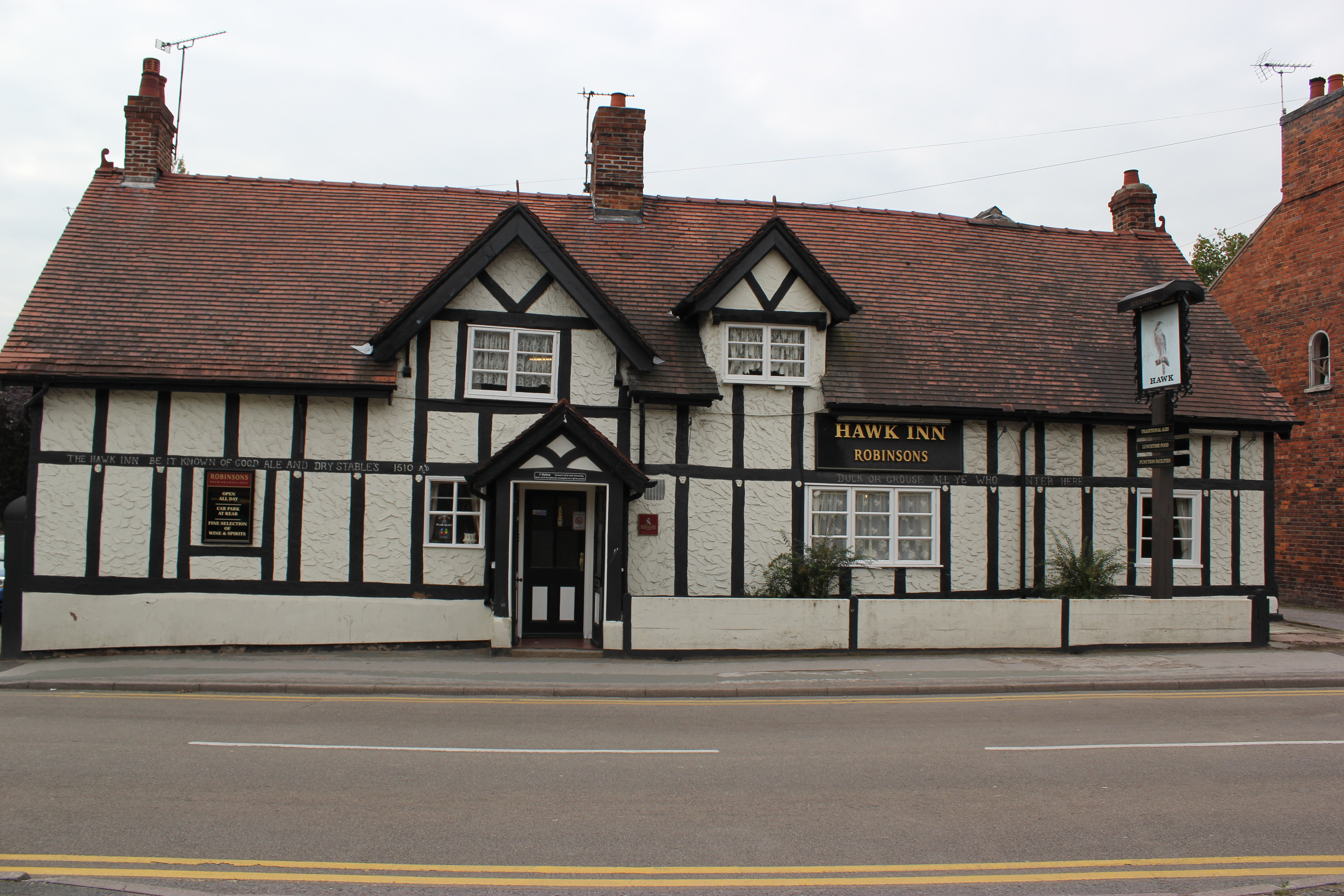
Hawk Inn, Haslington

=== Haslington Hall ===
Haslington Hall is a mainly timber framed building situated to the east of the village. Some of its structure dates back to 1480 but it is principally of 1545 with later additions. It was founded by the Vernon family and, in particular, Admiral Sir Francis Vernon who was involved in defeating the Spanish Armada. Notable more recent residents include Air Commodore Dame Felicity Peake, the first director of the Women's Royal Air Force and the dairy millionaire Tony Vernon.

=== Hawk Inn ===
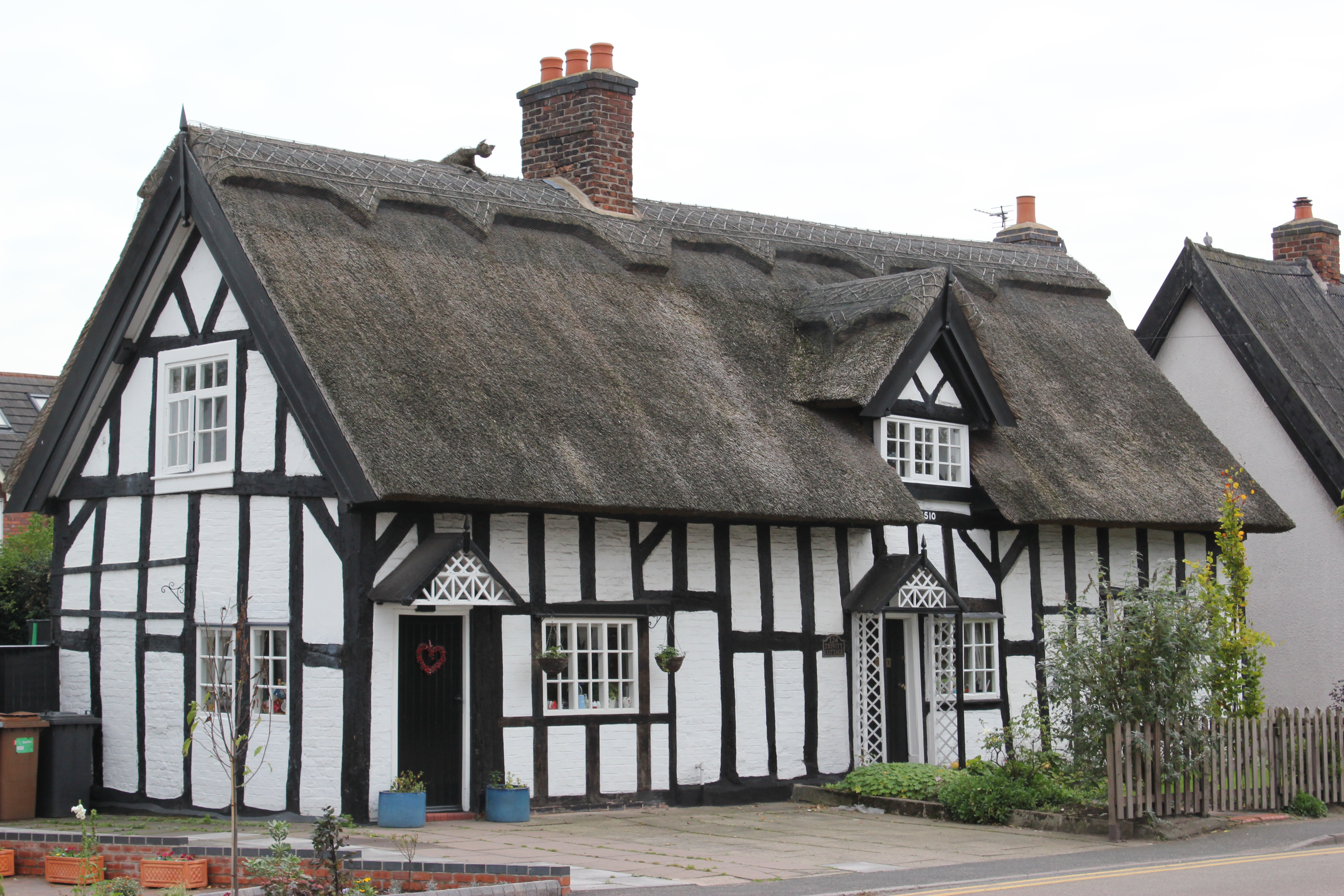
Old House, Haslington

The Hawk Inn is on the main road through the village, and dates from the 17th century; it is a Grade II listed building. The pub boasts carved woodwork both inside and out, including various carved faces and a number of engraved phrases on the exterior beams. The pub was once used for stabling horses and highwayman Dick Turpin supposedly once stayed there.

=== Old House ===
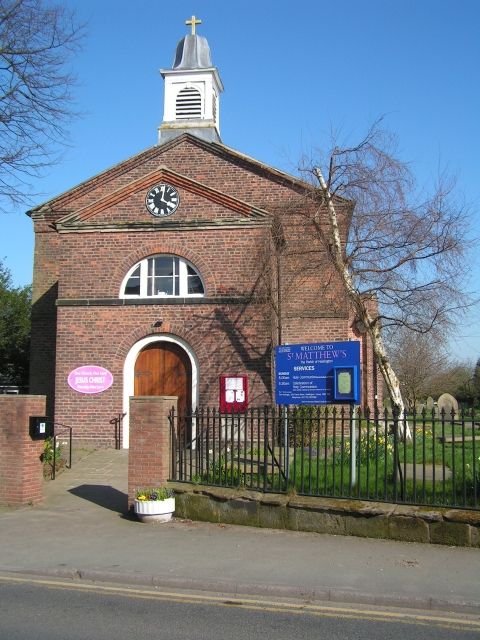
St. Matthew's Church, Haslington

Almost directly across from The Hawk Inn is a house, formerly two houses which have had the shared wall demolished in order to form a single dwelling, also dating from the 17th century. It too is a Grade II listed building. While the building is 17th century, the date 1510 is inscribed on a board over the door.

=== St. Matthew's Church ===
St. Matthew's Church is a small Anglican church. It was built in two phases: the first phase which is the west part in 1810, and the second phase or east part in 1909.

The west part is a simple, brick built structure, with arched doorway and windows. It also has a small cupola on the nave's gable. The east part is in the Decorated style, designed by Reginald Longden, and has incorporated into it, a seven-light east window.

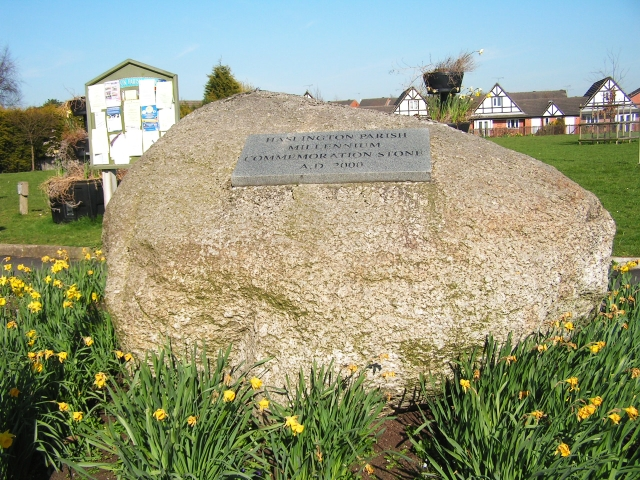
The Millennium Stone, Haslington

== Community facilities ==
The village has two primary schools (The Dingle and Haslington Primary). Both schools are part of the Sandbach Education Partnership (SEP) and are feeder schools for Sandbach School and Sandbach High School.
The Croft Pre-School is an independent pre-school administered by a parents' committee. It opened in 1981 and operates in the Gutterscroft Centre.

Haslington also has a village hall (The Yoxall Village Hall), St. Matthew's Church Hall and a community centre (Gutterscroft Centre), a dentist, an NHS health centre, a chemist, a doctor's surgery and four churches of various denominations.

Haslington Cricket Club runs four senior and six junior teams, and is situated on the outskirts of the village. In 2014 the 1st XI made headlines worldwide after bowling Wirral C.C. out for just 3 runs, the lowest recorded total in any league cricket for over 100 years.

There is also a Christian Boys' Brigade in the village; the company was founded in 1970 and operates from Haslington Methodist Church.

The Millennium Rock is a commemorative stone which is situated on the village green.

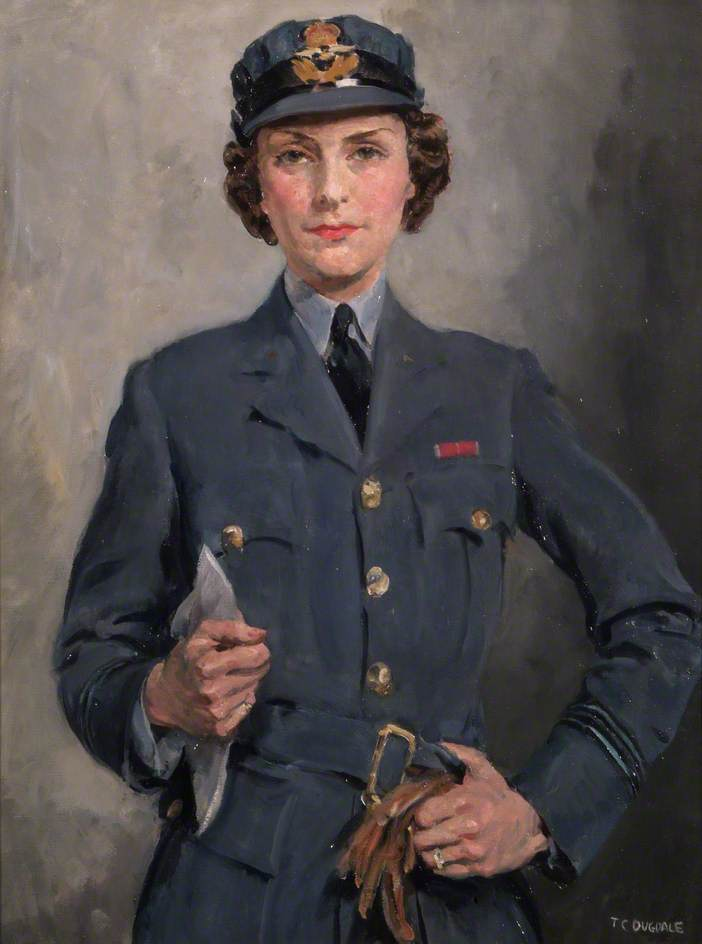
Air Commandant Dame Felicity Peake, ca 1941

== Notable people ==
- Admiral Sir Francis Vernon, active during the time of the Spanish Armada built Haslington Hall in 1545
- William Broome (1689 in Haslington – 1745), an English poet and translator.
- Herbert Birchenough (1874 in Haslington – 1942), an English football goalkeeper, who played 167 games in the Football League
- Air Commandant Dame Felicity Peake (1913–2002), the founding director of the UK's Women's Royal Air Force (WRAF), spent much of her youth at Haslington Hall
- Peter Goodwright (born 1936 in Haslington - 2020), comedy impressionist, star of the ITV impressions show Who Do You Do?
- Nick Powell (born 1994), footballer who has played over 330 games mainly for Stoke City

== See also ==
- Listed buildings in Haslington
