= St Matthew's Roman Catholic Church, Windsor =

- Location in Greater Metropolitan Sydney
- 33°36′33″S 150°48′55″E
- Location: Tebbutt Street, Windsor, City of Hawkesbury, New South Wales
- Address: Windsor, New South Wales
- Country: Australia
- Denomination: Roman Catholic
- Website: stmatthewswindsor.org.au

History
- Status: Church (1840–present)
- Founded: 28 December 1836 (foundation stone laid)
- Founder: Bishop John Bede Polding
- Consecrated: 21 October 1840

Architecture
- Functional status: Completed
- Architect: Thomas Bird
- Architectural type: Church
- Completed: October 1840

Specifications
- Capacity: c. 350

Administration
- Diocese: Parramatta
- Parish: St Patrick's Cathedral Parish

Clergy
- Bishop: Vincent Long Van Nguyen OFM Conv
- Priest: Fr Ranillo Creta

St Matthew's Catholic Church, Windsor is a Roman Catholic church building located at Tebbutt and Little Church Streets, Windsor, City of Hawkesbury, New South Wales, Australia. It is the church of St Matthew's parish (founded in 1832), which is the oldest parish in the Roman Catholic Diocese of Parramatta and one of the oldest Roman Catholic parishes in Australia.

St Matthew's is the oldest Roman Catholic church in continual use (since 1840) in mainland Australia, and is an early example of a stripped-down Gothic revival style. It was designed by architect Thomas Bird, who arrived in Sydney from England in January 1835.

== History ==
=== Early history of St Matthew's Parish ===
Early colonial New South Wales was Anglican, and officially appointed Catholic priests only obtained permission from the British Government to come to the Colony in 1819, arriving in 1820. Early conditions were difficult, with church services being held in private homes or barns. At Windsor, the new Convict Barracks was able to be used for a time, until it was converted into a hospital. While a church was needed, the parishioners of the district were not financial enough to raise enough funds to build one, and progress was slow.

An anecdote printed in a history of St Matthew's catholic Church relates that in the early days of settlement, the government decreed that each convict must worship on a Sunday. In the Hawkesbury area, it was ordered that prisoners worship “at St Matthew’s” (that is, St Matthew's Anglican Church, Windsor, which opened in 1822). In order to remain within the confines of the law, but to celebrate Mass instead of a Protestant service, the local Catholics called their church "St Matthew’s" too. This is reputedly why Windsor has two St Matthew's churches within walking distance of each other.

A grant of land was obtained in 1833 for a Roman Catholic church and cemetery in Windsor, although Catholic burials had been occurring locally well before this (the earliest known burial was of the remains of a man called Patrick Cullen, in 1822). The cemetery covered an area of three acres and one rood.

In 1834, the plan of Windsor showed the present site of the church (at modern Tebbut and Little Church Street) as being part of the Church Green (this probably being a reference to the nearby St Matthew's Anglican Church) and the adjacent farm, “Catherine Farm”.

=== Construction of St Matthew's Church ===
Lack of funds for building ceased to be an issue in 1836, when a bequest of 500 pounds in the Will of former convict James Doyle allowed construction to commence.

On 1 May 1836, Bishop Polding wrote, in a letter to Rev. Thomas Heptonstall that he had visited Windsor the

Sunday before last and celebrated Mass in our temporary chapel there. It was a barn and will be one again, made of slabs. A man by the name of Doyle died there a few weeks since, and he left five hundred pounds to build a church and two hundred pounds for a school. I hope to obtain as much from the government for the same purposes and to complete the two this year.

St Matthew's foundation stone was laid before the year was out, on 28 December 1836. Building of the church proceeded for nearly four years, and it was opened on 21 October 1840 with great ceremony by the Bishop of Sydney, the Right Rev. John Bede Polding, with the sermon being preached by the Very Rev. Dr William Ullathorne. The procession to the church was accompanied by the band of the 80th Regiment, and the choir of St Mary's Cathedral, Sydney, was also present for the service.

According to a District Surveyor's Plan dated 1889, modern Tebbutt Street used to be known as Glebe Street, and modern Little Church Street as simply Church Street.

The Church was designed in a cruciform shape with a porch at the front, and is possibly the first Australian Catholic Church designed with transepts. Although supposedly designed to seat 1,200 people, it accommodated around 350. The external walls are stuccoed brick with corner and intermediate buttresses, small transepts all originally with a shingled roof, but now with corrugated iron. The choir loft and a circular leadlight window high in the façade facing Tebbutt Street were added later.

== Clergy ==
The following were parish priests in charge of St Matthew's, Windsor in the 19th and 20th centuries.

- 1831 Christopher Vincent Dowling
- 1835 James Vincent Corcoran
- 1838 John Brady
- 1843 Thomas Slattery
- 1843 W.J. Dunne
- 1845 John Kenny
- 1845 M. McGrath
- 1847 John Joseph Therry
- 1848 John Grant
- 1851 Nicholas J. Coffey
- 1852 Patrick Hallinan
- 1874 Samuel John Austin Sheehy
- 1886 John Hayes
- 1898 B. McDonnell
- 1924 P. Galvin
- 1940 W. O’Flynn
- 1947 M. Coffey
- 1954 L.S. Murphy
- 1976 J.E. Dooley

== See also ==
- Australian non-residential architectural styles
- Roman Catholic Diocese of Parramatta
