= St. Matthew's Cathedral =

St. Matthew's Cathedral, or variations on the name, may refer to:

== Canada ==
- St. Matthew's Anglican Cathedral, Brandon, Manitoba
- St. Matthew's Cathedral (Timmins), Ontario

== Chile ==
- St. Matthew's Cathedral, Osorno

== Sudan ==
- St. Matthew's Cathedral, Khartoum

== United States ==
- Cathedral of St. Matthew the Apostle (Washington, D.C.)
- St. Matthew's Cathedral (South Bend, Indiana)
- Cathedral Church of Saint Matthew (Dallas)
- St. Matthew's Cathedral (Laramie, Wyoming)
