= Oakhanger, Cheshire =

Coordinates: 53.08°N 02.35°W

Oakhanger
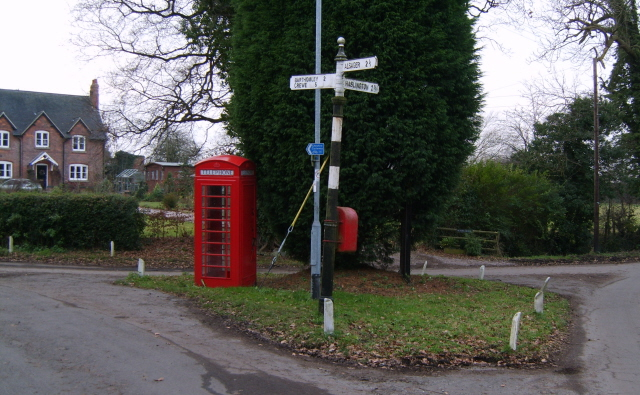
- Old phonebox and signpost in centre of Oakhanger

- Location within Cheshire
- OS grid reference: SJ7654
- Civil parish: Haslington
- Unitary authority: Cheshire East
- Ceremonial county: Cheshire
- Region: North West
- Country: England
- Sovereign state: United Kingdom
- Post town: Crewe
- Postcode district: CW1
- Dialling code: 01270
- Police: Cheshire
- Fire: Cheshire
- Ambulance: North West

Oakhanger is a village in Cheshire, England, within the civil parish of Haslington and the Borough of Cheshire East, located off the B5077 road between Alsager and Crewe.

== Oakhanger Moss ==
Oakhanger Moss is a Site of Special Scientific Interest SSSI covering 13.58ha. English Nature reports that it was originally a mere within a glacial hollow; since the 17th century the water has become filled with vegetation creating a raised peat bog. Adders can be found on the site. Neighbouring sites such as White Moss have been excavated for commercial peat production.

== See also ==
- St Luke's Church, Oakhanger
