= St. Matthew's Anglican Church (Namibia) =

Anglican church in Walvis Bay, Namibia

Coordinates: 22°57′41″S 14°29′42″E

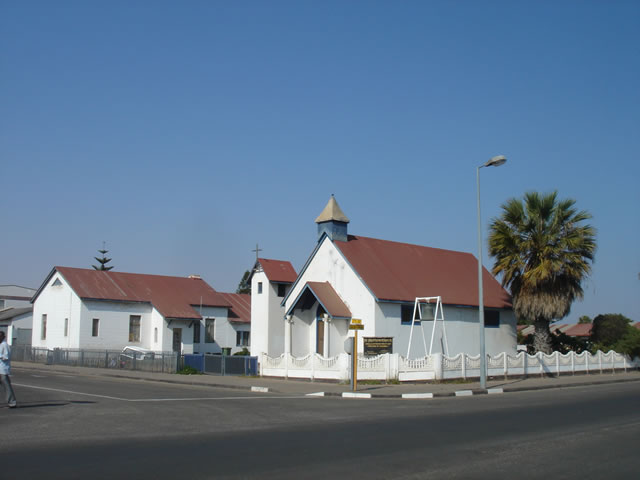
Church and Rectory.

St. Matthew's Anglican Church is an Anglican church in Walvis Bay, Namibia. It is part of the Anglican Diocese of Namibia, which is a diocese of the Anglican Church of Southern Africa.

The church was consecrated on 21 September 1924 by Bishop Nelson Fogarty. It was originally built with wood and placed on stilts but was later covered in chicken mesh and plaster coating. The bell of St. Matthew's dates to 1623. Weighing 600kg, it is now cracked and no longer rings.

St. Matthew's is the second oldest still-standing structure in the city. By 2008, it was crumbling and had a dwindling congregation. Despite being the second oldest structure in Namibia's second largest city, it was not registered as an historical monument as of September 2008.

The church is one of three in the parish of Walvis Bay; the other two are St. Saviour's and Holy Redeemer.
