= Whittall Mills =

- U.S. National Register of Historic Places
- U.S. Historic district
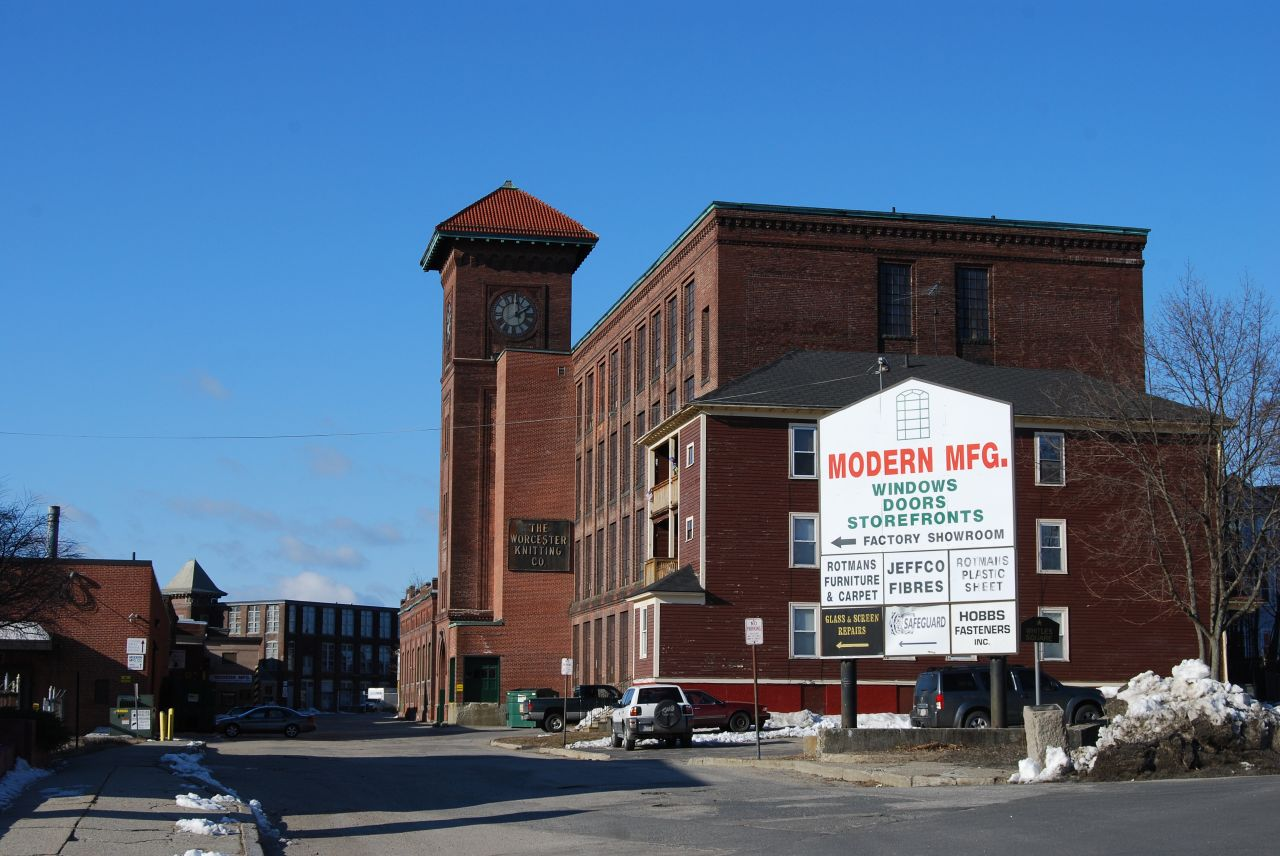
- The main office building in 2009

- Location within Massachusetts Location within the United States
- Location: 12 Brussels St., Worcester, Massachusetts
- Coordinates: 42°14′27″N 71°48′54″W
- Built: 1890
- Architectural style: Colonial Revival
- MPS: Worcester MRA
- NRHP reference No.: 80000490
- Added to NRHP: March 5, 1980

The Whittall Mills is an historic industrial complex in southern Worcester, Massachusetts. The complex, which was built between 1870 and 1930, is a reminder of the large carpet manufacturing business that was once a major presence in the city. It is a complex of 15 brick buildings located on a bend of the Middle River (a tributary of the Blackstone River), south of Crompton Street and just west of Interstate 290.

== History ==
Carpet Mill #2, built in 1889

The mill complex has its origins in about 1870, when the first of the surviving buildings, a three-story brick building with a mansard roof, was erected by the Crompton Rug Company. It was followed a few years later by a dye house. Crompton Rug went out of business in 1879, and these premises were leased to William Hogg, who eventually formed the Worcester Carpet Company, which expanded the complex with a second major mill and the purchase of additional water rights in 1893.

Matthew Whittall, who first gained notice as a supervisor at Crompton Rug, had opened his own factory in other parts of Worcester in 1874. By 1883 his business had grown, and he acquired land next to the Crompton works, where he built a series of buildings over the next 23 years. At the time of the First World War, Whittall was the largest employer in south Worcester, with 1,500 workers operating 350 mills in 500,000 square feet of factory space. The products he produced were purchased by the federal government for use in its buildings, and were selected by President William McKinley for use in the White House.

Whittall sold the mills in 1950. They were listed on the National Register of Historic Places in 1980.

== See also ==
- National Register of Historic Places listings in southwestern Worcester, Massachusetts
