= Winterley and Wheelock Heath =

Villages in Cheshire, England

Coordinates: 53.1132°N 2.3786°W

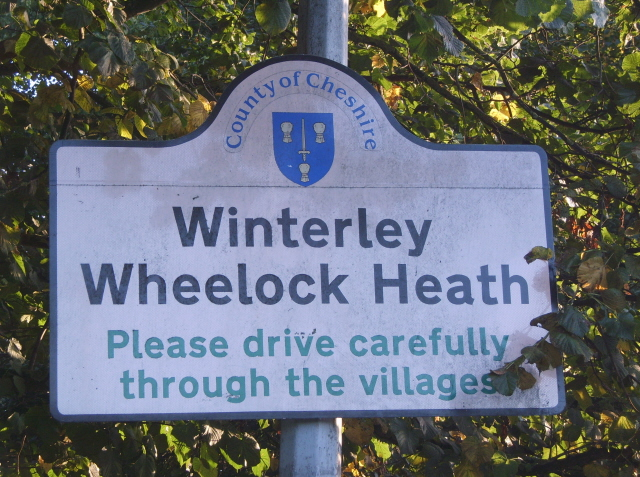
- Road sign at entrance to villages

- Location within Cheshire
- OS grid reference: SJ747574
- Civil parish: Haslington
- Unitary authority: Cheshire East
- Ceremonial county: Cheshire
- Region: North West
- Country: England
- Sovereign state: United Kingdom
- Post town: CREWE
- Postcode district: CW11 4
- Dialling code: 01270
- Police: Cheshire
- Fire: Cheshire
- Ambulance: North West
- UK Parliament: Crewe and Nantwich

Winterley and Wheelock Heath are two small, adjoining, villages in the civil parish of Haslington, Cheshire, England. A small part of Wheelock Heath is in the town and civil parish of Sandbach.

== Geography ==
The villages are based mainly around Crewe Road, which directly links nearby towns Crewe and Sandbach. They are three miles from the M6 motorway.

== Transport ==
The villages were formerly on the main Crewe to Sandbach road. This had been constructed as a turnpike road from Nantwich to Wheelock Wharf on the Grand Trunk Canal in 1816. This became the A534 road, which was diverted out of the area with the opening of the Haslington Bypass in 1990.

There are no rail services in the immediate area, the nearest station being four miles (6.5 km) away at Crewe on the West Coast Main Line. Bus services are provided by Arriva North West, Harrier and Warrington's Own Buses.

== Education ==
Most children go to primary schools in nearby Haslington, such as Dingle C.P. School or Haslington Primary and receive secondary education in either Sandbach or Crewe, most commonly Sandbach School (boys) and Sandbach High School and Sixth Form College (girls).

The more popular nearby primary schools for Winterley residents are both located in nearby Haslington.

The more popular nearby secondary schools for Winterley residents are located in nearby Sandbach.

== Churches ==
Winterley has Baptist and Methodist Churches.

The Baptist Church in Winterley is located on Hassall Road, and is known as Wheelock Heath Baptist Church.

Winterley's Methodist Church Brass Band has its own official website (see below).

== Sports and leisure ==
Winterley Pool is a fishing lake that serves as the centre-point to Winterley. The pool was formerly used to power a corn mill, with water flowing through a channel cut to Fowle Brook. There are two pools to fish; the larger front pool and the smaller Match Pool to the rear. The main pool has a large resident population of mute swans and various species of geese.
