= St. Matthias Church =

St. Matthias Church and variations such as Saint Matthias' Church may refer to various churches, some named specifically for Saint Matthias:

== Australia ==
- St Matthias' Anglican Church, Paddington

== Canada ==
- St. Matthias, Bellwoods, an Anglo-Catholic church in Toronto, Ontario

== England ==
- St Matthias' Church, Farm Street, Birmingham
- St Matthias, Bristol
- St Matthias' Church, Burley
- St Matthias Church, Richmond, an Anglican church in Richmond, London
- St Matthias the Apostle church, Colindale, an Anglican church in Colindale, London
- St Matthias Old Church, in Poplar, in east London
- St Matthias' Church, Canning Town, in east London
- St. Matthias' Church, Stoke Newington, an Anglican church in Stoke Newington, north London
- Church of St Matthias, Malvern Link
- St Matthias' Church, Nottingham

== Germany ==
- St. Matthias' Abbey, a Benedictine monastery in Trier, Rhineland-Palatinate

== Hungary ==
- Matthias Church, Budapest

== India ==
- St. Matthias' Church, Kunnamkulam, in Kerala, a Malankara Orthodox Syrian Church
- St. Matthias' Church, Vepery, in Chennai

== Ireland ==
- St. Matthias' Church, Dublin, a former protestant church

== Nigeria ==
- St. Mattias Anglican Church Anaku, in Anaku Town, Anambra State, South-Eastern Nigeria

== Philippines ==
- San Matias Parish Church, in Santo Tomas, Pampanga
- San Matias Parish, in Tumauini, Isabela

== Sri Lanka ==
- St Matthias' Church, Lakshapathiya, Moratuwa

== United States ==
- St. Matthias Roman Catholic Church, Ridgewood, Queens, New York
- St. Matthias' Episcopal Church (Omaha, Nebraska), NRHP-listed in Douglas County
- St. Matthias Episcopal Church (Asheville, North Carolina), NRHP-listed in Buncombe County
- St. Matthias Mission, near New Fane, Wisconsin, listed on the National Register of Historic Places
- St. Matthias Episcopal Church (Waukesha, Wisconsin), NRHP-listed in Waukesha County

== See also ==
- St. Matthias Episcopal Church (disambiguation), including several churches in the United States
- St. Matthews' Episcopal Church (disambiguation)
- St Matthias School, Wolverhampton, West Midlands, England
- St. Matthias Anglo Indian Higher Secondary School, in St. Matthias Church Compound, Chennai, India
- Saint Matthias (disambiguation)
