= Saint Matthias (disambiguation) =

Saint Matthias was an Apostle.

Saint Matthias may also refer to:

- St Matthias Islands, Papua New Guinea
- St Matthias languages, a pair of Oceanic languages spoken in the St. Matthias Islands, Mussau-Emira and Tenis
- St. Mathias Township, Minnesota
- St Matthias, Bristol a former campus of the University of the West of England, Bristol
- St Matthias School, a secondary school in Wolverhampton, England
- St. Matthias High School, a girls' private Roman Catholic high school in Downey, California
- St Matthias Press and Tapes or Matthias Media, a Christian publisher in Sydney, Australia
- St. Matthias Press UK or The Good Book Company, a Christian publisher in Surrey, England

== See also ==
- Robert Matthews (religious impostor) or Matthias the Prophet, a 19th-century American religious con artist
- St. Matthias Church (disambiguation)
- Saint-Mathias-sur-Richelieu, Quebec, Canada
