= St. Matthias Episcopal Church =

St. Matthias Episcopal Church may refer to:

- St. Matthias' Episcopal Church (Omaha, Nebraska), listed on the National Register of Historic Places (NRHP) in Douglas County
- St. Matthias Episcopal Church (Asheville, North Carolina), NRHP-listed in Buncombe County
- St. Matthias Episcopal Church (Waukesha, Wisconsin), NRHP-listed in Waukesha County

== See also ==
- St. Matthias Church (disambiguation)
- St. Matthew's Episcopal Church (disambiguation)
