= Bentinck School, Vepery =

Bentinck Higher Secondary School

Location
- 2, Jermiah Rd, Vepery, Periyamet; Chennai, Tamil Nadu, 600007; India; 13.0862°N 80.2605°E

Information
- Former name: London Mission School, Mrs. W Porter’s School
- Type: Government Aided, Private School
- Established: 1837; 189 years ago
- Founder: Anna Drew of the London Missionary Society
- School district: Association of St Christopher's College of Education
- Houses: Diamonds, Emeralds, Rubies, Sapphires
- Affiliation: Government of Tamilnadu
- Website: bentinckschool.edu.in

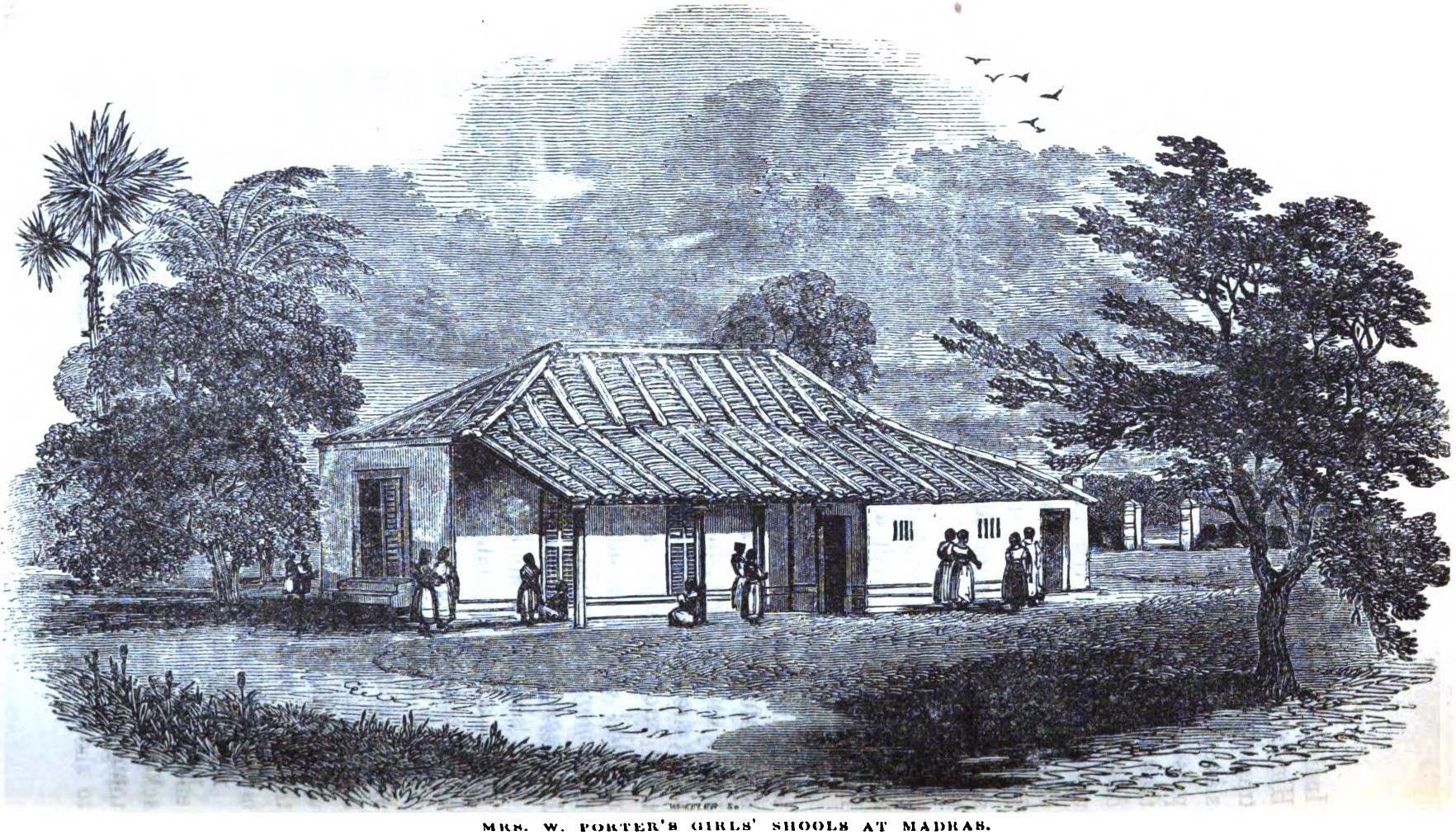
Mrs. W. Porter's Girls' Schools at Madras (1847, p. 87)

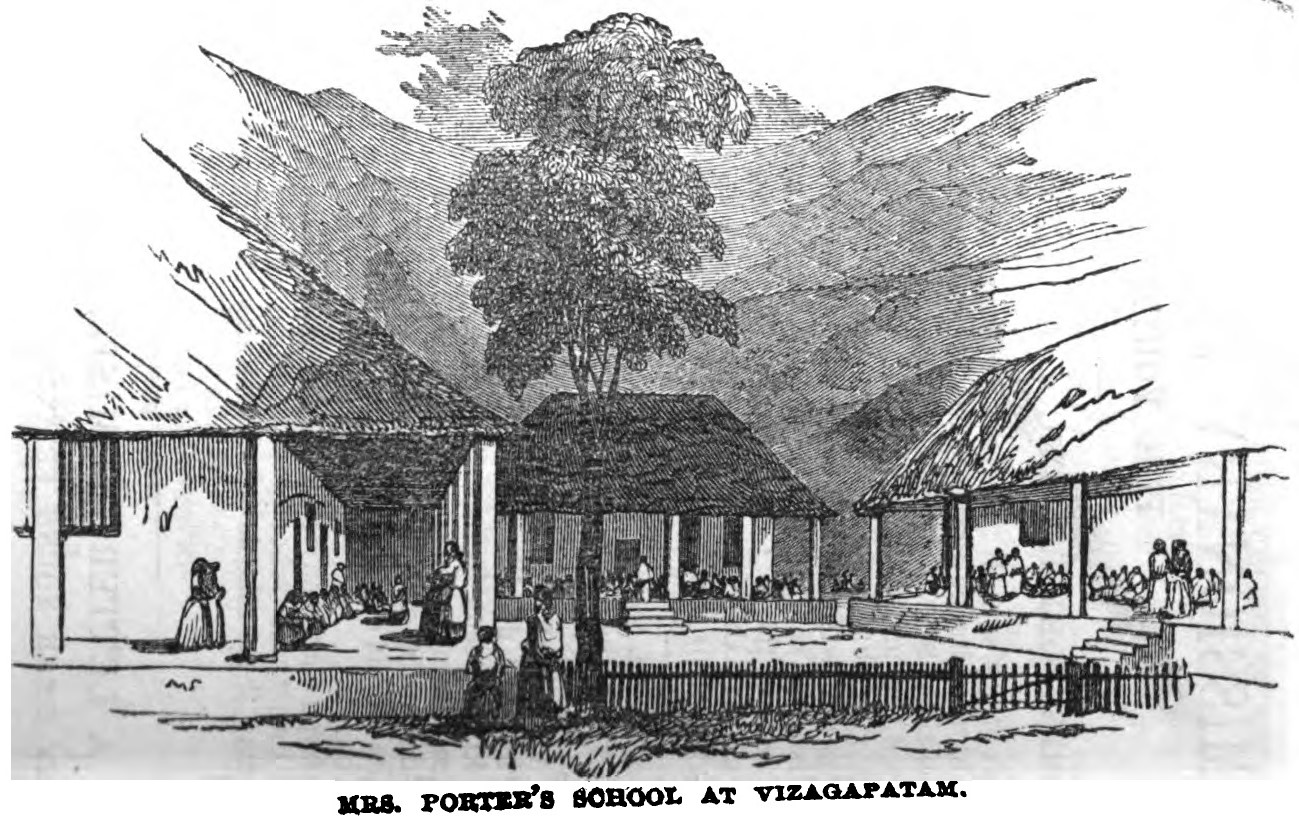
Mrs. Porter's School at Vizagapatam (1849, p.82)

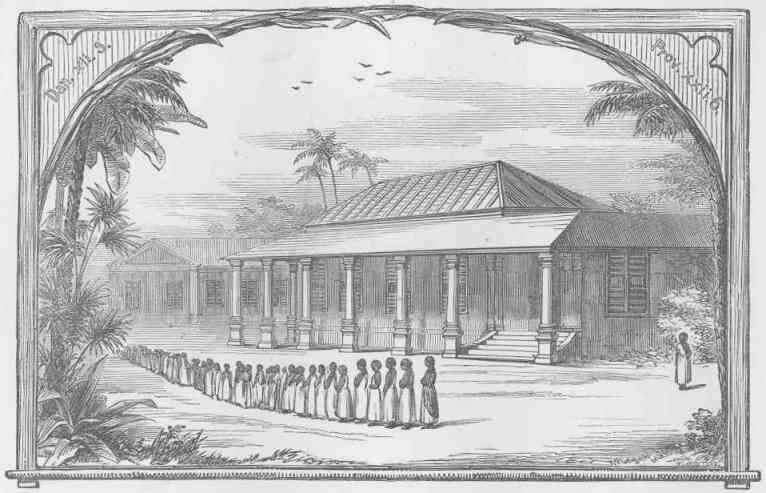
Mrs. Corbold's Girls' School, Madras (LMS, 1869, p.58)

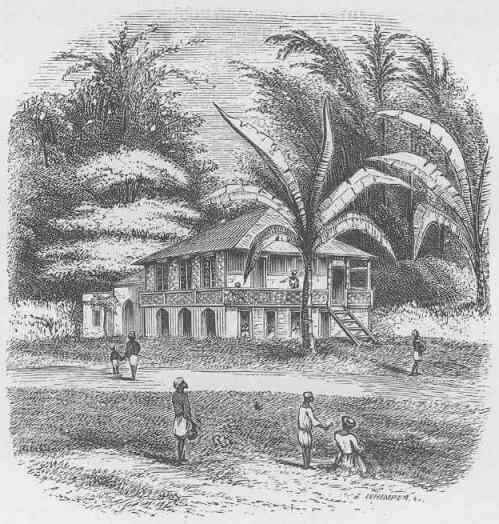
London Mission School-House, Cuddapah (LMS, 1869, p.16)

The Bentinck Higher Secondary School is located on Jermiah Road, Vepery, Chennai, near the Vepery Police Station. The school is considered to be one of Chennai's best girls' schools and is aided by Government of Tamilnadu. The school offers education to girls in English, Tamil and Telugu mediums till class 10. English and Tamil medium in class 11 and 12. The school is also known as simply the Bentinck School or Bentinck Vepery. The school is 185 years old. Started in 1837 with just 21 students, the school now has more than 2000 students.

== History ==
The school was established in 1837, by Mrs. Anna Drew, a missionary of the London Missionary Society, posted in the Madras Presidency, British India. Anna Drew (née Sheridan), was the widow of Rev. William Hoyles Drew, who died from cholera in Pulicat, and cousin of English playwright Richard Brinsley Sheridan. The institution started with just 21 orphans, who were housed in a bungalow. Then known as the London Mission School, the main units taught were needle work and scriptures. At one stage, Mrs. W Porter became the head mistress, and made many improvements, such that the school came to be known as Mrs. W Porter's School. In 1852, the school moved to its campus on Jermiah Road. In 1915, the school was renamed as the Bentinck School, in honour of Lord William Bentinck, Governor General of India. Another prominent head mistresses was Marjorie Sykes, a Gandhian who served the school between 1930 and 1939, before leaving the school to join the Shantiniketan.

== Recognition and education ==
Since its inception, the school had a policy of admitting girls from low caste and poor families. In 1898, the school was granted recognition as a high school, and in 1899, the first student was admitted to college. In 1978, the school became a higher secondary school (offering Year 11 and Year 12). The Bentinck School once offered Education in English, Tamil and Telugu, the main languages of the Madras Presidency. There were special hostels for students coming from Andhra Pradesh and Meghalaya. However, it now offers only English Medium Education. Once it was a challenge to get girls to continue their education, due to the high level of dropouts. The situation has now changed, with the school being favored for its quality of education.

== Mrs. William Porter ==
Mrs. William Porter took over as the Head Mistress of the London Mission School in the 1840s. This was the time when the women did not have equal status in Indian society. Mrs. Porter reporting on the condition of women in British India in 'The Missionary Repository for Youth, and Sunday School Missionary Magazine', explains, how women could not come in front of men, and female infanticide being common. Mrs. Porter also had trouble getting higher caste people in getting to send their girls to school, as they did want their children to study with lower caste pupils. Later Mrs. Porter also helped in running another school at Vizagapatam. A sketch of the London Mission school appeared in the magazine in 1847.

As reported in 'The Missionary Magazine and Chronicle' in 1843, the Native Female Boarding School was superintended by Mrs. William Porter. The enrollments of the number of native children had increased considerably since its inception. In 1843, there were 50 girls who were provided boarding, clothing, food and education. The education was mainly in the vernacular languages, however English was also being taught.

== Marjorie Sykes ==
Marjorie Sykes (1905–1995) was born in Mexborough, Yorkshire, England on 11 May 1905, as the daughter of a village schoolmaster. Sykes was nine years old when the First World War broke out, forcing a beloved teacher, who happened to be German, to leave her position. Benefiting from a scholarship, Sykes began college studies in 1923 at Newnham College, Cambridge. There she heard of Mahatma Gandhi from the many Indian students.

Sykes came to Madras (now called Chennai) in 1928 to serve as a teacher at the Bentinck School, remaining a resident of India for more than 60 years. She contributed enormous effort to advancing new forms of education advocated by Mahatma Gandhi and Rabindranath Tagore. In late 1928, a talk by Chakravarti Rajagopalachari inspired Sykes' interest in participating in the independence movement. Late in 1938, she met both Rabindranath Tagore (traveling to his school at Shantiniketan) and Mahatma Gandhi (traveling to his ashram at Sevagram). Beginning in 1939 she joined Santiniketan, working closely with Tagore and becoming acquainted with C.F. Andrews, later in 1944-46 holding the C.F. Andrews Memorial Chair at Santiniketan while working on Andrews' biography.

In 1945, Gandhi invited Sykes to join his team working on Nai Talim (New Education), and she later became Principal of Gandhi's Basic Education Programme at Sevagram. In the 1960s Sykes served in efforts to bring peace in Nagaland, as well as living and conducting nonviolence training in Kotagiri in the Nilgiris Hills, and becoming increasingly active among Quakers, at Rasulia (Madhya Pradesh) as well as outside India.

After an illness, at age 85 years, Sykes moved in 1991 from India to Swarthmore, a Quaker residential home in Buckinghamshire, England, where she remained until her death on 17 August 1995.

=== Marjorie Sykes at the Bentinck School ===
In May 1928, Marjorie Sykes was requested to take up work as a teacher at the Bentinck School, which was run by the London Missionary Society, and left England in October 1928. At that time the Bentinck School had only 350 girl students, and was being run like a family institution. Even though, it was a Christian school, education was being imparted to all sections of society irrespective of caste or religion. Further, the school taught children in their own mother tongue (Tamil and Telugu), rather than English. After joining, Marjorie broke norms by interacting closely with the natives, wearing khadi, traveling in native buses, riding bicycles and choosing to be a vegetarian. Marjorie soon learnt and mastered the Tamil (later on she also learnt Bengali and Hindi). In 1930, Marjorie was appointed as the Principal of the Bentinck School after the resignation of Alice Varley after her marriage to Quaker Ted Barnes. Alice and Marjorie remained friends for life.
