= TJF =

TJF may refer to:

- The Jared Foundation, a charity
- The Jitsu Foundation, a national-level association of sports clubs headquartered in the United Kingdom with affiliated organisations in other countries
- Thomas Jefferson Foundation, the governing and operating body of Monticello and its grounds as a house museum and educational institution in Virginia
- The Joy Formidable, a Welsh alternative rock band
- Tom Joyner Foundation, an American foundation that provides financial assistance to students at historically black colleges and universities
- Tulsa Jesus Freak, a Lana Del Rey song
