= Deansfield =

Area of West Midlands, England

Coordinates: 52.585°N 2.094°W

Deansfield is an area of Wolverhampton, West Midlands, England. It is situated in the city council's East Park ward, to the east of the city centre.

Most of the housing in the area was built by the local council during the 1950s but has since been bought by private owners.

St Matthias School (formerly Deansfield Community School), founded in 1968, is located in the area. It also has a main link road connecting Wednesfield to Bilston via Stowheath Lane.

This provides a vital link to the Black Country and more importantly the Black Country Route, which provides access to towns such as West Bromwich, Wednesbury, Darlaston and Birmingham.
