= Marjorie Sykes =

British educator (1905–1995)

- Born: Marjorie Sykes; 11 May 1905; Mexborough, Yorkshire, England
- Died: 17 August 1995 (aged 90); United Kingdom
- Citizenship: United Kingdom (1905–1947); India (1947–1995)
- Education: Newnham College, Cambridge
- Occupations: Educator; Author; Independence worker

Marjorie Sykes (11 May 1905 – 17 August 1995) was a British-born Indian educator who went to live in India in the 1920s and joined the Indian independence movement, spending most of the remainder of her life in India. She wrote many books and became acquainted with many of the leading figures in Indian politics and culture, including Rabindranath Tagore and Mahatma Gandhi.

== Biography ==
The daughter of a village schoolmaster, Marjorie Sykes was born in Mexborough, Yorkshire, England on 11 May 1905. Sykes was nine years old when the First World War broke out, forcing a beloved teacher, who happened to be German, to leave her position. Benefiting from a scholarship, Sykes began college studies in 1923 at Newnham College, Cambridge. There she heard of Mahatma Gandhi from the many Indian students. She graduated with first class honors in English in 1928.

Sykes came to Madras (now called Chennai) in 1928 to serve as a teacher at the Bentinck School, Vepery, remaining a resident of India for more than 60 years. She contributed enormous effort to advancing new forms of education advocated by Mahatma Gandhi and Rabindranath Tagore.

In late 1928, a talk by Chakravarti Rajagopalachari inspired Sykes' interest in participating in the independence movement. Late in 1938, she met both Rabindranath Tagore (traveling to his school at Shantiniketan) and Mahatma Gandhi (traveling to his ashram at Sevagram). Beginning in 1939 she joined Santiniketan, working closely with Tagore and becoming acquainted with C.F. Andrews, later in 1944-46 holding the C.F. Andrews Memorial Chair at Santiniketan while working on Andrews' biography.

In 1945, Gandhi invited Sykes to join his team working on Nai Talim (New Education), and she later became Principal of Gandhi's Basic Education Programme at Sevagram. In the 1960s Sykes served in efforts to bring peace in Nagaland, as well as living and conducting nonviolence training in Kotagiri in the Nilgiris Hills, and becoming increasingly active among Quakers, at Rasulia (Madhya Pradesh) as well as outside India. She also acquired Indian citizenship upon Indian independence in 1947.

After an illness, at age 85 years, Sykes moved in 1991 from India to Swarthmore, a Quaker residential home in Buckinghamshire, England, where she remained until her death on 17 August 1995.

The Marjorie Sykes room at Friends House, London, UK is named after her.

== Works about Sykes ==
Sykes' life and work has been the focus of books, chapters, and newspaper articles. In 2005, a decade after her death, the centenary of Sykes' birth was observed in a lengthy biographical article published in The Hindu. An earlier article in Gandhi Marg had also described her life. Sykes was also the focus of an entry in the Oxford Dictionary of National Biography, and of a chapter in a doctoral dissertation in History by Sharon M. H. MacDonald (2010). A book-length biography of Sykes was published two years before her death.

== Selected works ==
Books authored by Marjorie Sykes include:

- Sykes, Marjorie; Dart, Martha (Ed.) (1999). In Quaker friendship: Letters from Marjorie Sykes to Martha Dart 1967 to 1994. York: William Sessions Ltd. ISBN 9781850722236. OCLC 41582224. (133 pages)
- Sykes, Marjorie; Carnall, Geoffrey (Ed.) (1997). An Indian Tapestry: Quaker threads in the History of India, Pakistan & Bangladesh: from the Seventeenth Century to Independence. York: Sessions Book Trust. ISBN 9781850721352. OCLC 59624845.
- Maw, Geoffrey Waring; Conacher, Gillian M.; Sykes, Marjorie (1997). Pilgrims in Hindu holy land: sacred shrines of the Indian Himalayas. York: Sessions Book Trust. ISBN 9781850721901. OCLC 37199052.
- Sykes, Marjorie; Dart, Martha (Ed.) (1995). Transcending tradition: Excerpts from the writings and talks of Marjorie Sykes. York, England: W. Sessions in association with Woodbrooke College. ISBN 9781850721703. OCLC 37400713. (104 pages)
- Sykes, Marjorie (1988). The story of Nai Talim : fifty years of education at Sevagram, 1937-1987 : a record of reflections. Sevagram, Wardha: Nai Talim Samiti. OCLC 21280322.
- Patel, Jehangir P.; Sykes, Marjorie (1987). Gandhi: His Gift of the Fight. Rasulia: Friends Rural Centre. OCLC 22506192.
- Sykes, Marjorie (1980). Quakers in India: A forgotten century. London: Allen and Unwin. ISBN 9780042750033. OCLC 7772558.
- Sykes, Marjorie (1954). A picture and programme of post basic education (adolescent education in Nai Talim). Sevagram, Wardha: Hindustani Talimi Sangh. OCLC 8957351.
- Arnold, Channing; Sykes, Marjorie (1954). The story of the Mahabharata. Bombay: Orient Longmans. OCLC 3368450.
- Sykes, Marjorie (1950). The story of Rabindranath Tagore. Bombay: Orient Longmans. OCLC 14369601.
- Caturvedī, Banārasīdāsa; Sykes, Marjorie (1950). Charles Freer Andrews; a narrative. New York: Harper. OCLC 2015692.

Writings by others that were edited by Marjorie Sykes include:

- Andrews, Charles Freer; Sykes, Marjorie (1973). Representative Writings. New York: National Book Trust, India. OCLC 1302816.
- Vinobā; Sykes, Marjorie (1963). Shanti sena. Rajghat: Sarva Seva Sangh Prakashan. OCLC 1995857.
