= The Jitsu Foundation =

The Jiu Jitsu Foundation
- Logo of The Jitsu Foundation
- Also known as: TJF / TJJF
- Focus: Self defence
- Country of origin: United Kingdom (Note: Techniques however have heritage in Japanese Jujutsu.)
- Creator: Peter Farrar, Brian Graham
- Parenthood: Judo (and other Jujutsu ryu)
- Official website: www.jitsufoundation.org

The Jiu Jitsu Foundation or TJJF is a national-level association of sports clubs headquartered in the United Kingdom, but also has affiliated organisations in other countries around the world (Australia, Austria, Spain, Canada, Cyprus, The Netherlands, New Zealand, South Africa, Argentina, Japan, Kenya, British Virgin Islands, Denmark). Focusing on standing throws and locks using weakening strikes to assist, the style taught within the association is known as Shorinji Kan Jiu Jitsu(少林寺完柔術).

== Style ==
Shorinji Kan Jiu Jitsu is taught as a self-defence system which acknowledges that situations may include multiple armed or unarmed opponents, rather than a single "one on one" officiated match. Joint locks and throws, complemented by weakening strikes, are employed to deal with attackers in an efficient way. Practice is usually done in pairs, with one person (uke) attacking, and the other person (tori) performing a defensive technique. The style includes some treatment of groundwork (newaza) however to a lesser degree than some sports-based styles of jujutsu. Much of the competition focus of styles such as Brazilian Jiu-Jitsu and Judo is ignored in favour of maintaining awareness of the complete surroundings, with all possible threats considered. The commonly held prescriptions of "clean fighting" are disregarded in The Jiu Jitsu Foundation and the use of all advantages available (including groin strikes, hair pulling, spinal locks, eye rakes, and, to a small extent, nerve points), is encouraged (although in competitions such as the Randori Nationals, these techniques are not permitted). The style has adopted the name 'jitsu', a shortened version of 'jiu jitsu,' or 'jujutsu.'

== History ==
=== Precursors ===
The style currently practised by The Jiu Jitsu Foundation traces its roots to Shihan Matthew Komp (10th dan in jujutsu, highest grade in Australia) from Bonn and Cologne, Germany who learned judo and jujutsu from various instructors including Wolfe, who had trained in Japan prior to World War II, and Hassermayer. Komp, who also held grades in aikido and karate, emigrated to Australia in 1953, where he founded German style jujitsu schools in Ascot Vale, Maidstone and Footscray, suburbs in Melbourne. In addition to jujutsu, Komp taught judo to his students. They wore their judo grades as belts and their jujutsu grades as a colour flash on their sleeves. An infrequent visitor to the club was Akira Miura (also referred to as Riukia or "Rocky" Myura), who was, according to some accounts, the Chief Unarmed Combat instructor at the Tokyo Police Academy, Japan.

The most likely lineage for Komp's instructors (Wolfe and Hassermayer) point towards the Kodokan. Early English Judo texts show a strong similarity in the techniques of self-defence that are a key element of The Jiu Jitsu Foundation style.

Komp taught Brian Graham who, having emigrated from the UK to Australia, later returned to the UK in the late 1960s as a second dan in judo as well as a first dan in jujutsu. Graham named his style Shorinji Kempo Jiu Jitsu, then later changed the name to Shorinji Kan Jiu Jitsu, and this name has been kept to the present day. Graham established his first jujutsu club in Keighley, Yorkshire. One of Graham's first students, Peter Farrar, who started learning jujutsu at the age of 9 in 1969, expanded the style and the association. He started his first collegiate club at Plymouth Polytechnic (now the University of Plymouth), and his students moved and spread the style.

To cope with the administrative and organisational demands of the growing number of clubs, an association was formed called the National Samurai Jiu Jitsu Association (NSJJA). The NSJJA organised and ran national competitions, courses and gradings. There is no current Japanese link.

=== Organisation ===
In 1990 the growing demands from within the organisation for further expansion of Jiu Jitsu clubs internationally, and for courses to be made available to the commercial sector, required the reorganisation of the NSJJA. The strengths and resources were consolidated into separate divisions to service the competing interests of the organisation. The Jiu Jitsu Foundation was formed to coordinate the activities of:

- The Jitsu Association, promoting the art, coordinating the activities, and servicing the requirements of Jitsu Clubs
- Studio III, providing training courses, and promoting the ideals, philosophies and benefits of non-aversive behaviour management
- Research and Development, exploring the boundaries of Jitsu, and providing a fusion of skills drawn from Jitsu training and academic research.

The Jitsu Foundation was driven by its Directing Tertiary Peter Farrar, and much of its success can be attributed to his charismatic leadership and the hard work of the Tertiary Board. Peter Farrar died in 1997, but the foundation continued to grow under the direction of Directing Tertiary Dave Walker. The current head of the tertiary board is Eric Law and in 2017 there were 100 TJJF clubs in the UK, with St Matthias School Jiu Jitsu Club set up by Max Game being No. 100.

Success in the UK has also been matched by the growth of TJJF affiliated organisations throughout the world. The first was the Cyprus Jitsu Association (CJA), started by Andy Wallace in 1989 and then instructed by Jules Robson from 1992 to 1997. The Limassol club was recently reopened by Andreas Stylianou. In 1993, Andy Dobie moved to Canada and opened clubs at Trent University, Peterborough, Ontario and at Carleton University in Ottawa, Ontario. In 1995, Mike Mallen opened his club in Spartanburg, South Carolina, United States. In 2011 Jitsu Australasia (founded in 2002) split into Jitsu New Zealand under Simon Ogden and Jitsu Oceania under Jules Robson. There are 3 clubs in Jitsu New Zealand (Wellington, Napier & Masterton) and the Chief Instructor is Simon Ogden. Jitsu Oceania closed in 2017 as Jules Robson turned to studying Koryu Jujutsu. In Australia, there are 2 clubs in Greater Sydney - Mount Druitt PCYC NSW, and Sydney Jitsu (Inner West) respectively run by Rodney Moulder and Franck Royer, and 1 club in Brisbane run by Fiona Spence. Doug Austing contributed to the development of Jitsu in Australia through the establishment of clubs at Penrith PCYC and Southern Highlands PCYC in New South Wales. He died on 24 March 2023. Jitsu South Africa was established in 2005 by Davis Cook, with clubs in Pretoria (2005), and Johannesburg (2009); while the SA clubs closed during COVID, Davis subsequently emigrated to Kenya where he established the Nairobi club in 2024. In 2014, Andreas Lerch established a club in Vienna, Austria. In 2012 Charlie Robinson opened a club in Buenos Aires, Argentina, and a second club opened in the provincial region in 2019 under José María Vaquer. TJF affiliated international associations have also opened in the Netherlands, Angola, Brazil, Japan, British Virgin Islands, Denmark and Spain. As of 2025 there were 20 non-UK clubs registered with TJF.

In 1997 Matthew Komp visited the UK and conferred the grade of sixth Dan and the title Shihan to Brian Graham. Brian Graham died on 15 June 2005. In an attempt to modernise its image, TJJF changed its logo in 2004 from the depiction of one figure throwing another in black and white against a red and yellow sunshine background reminiscent of the old flag of Japan to a plain red square with the word "Jitsu". TJJF has had success in establishing its clubs in British universities, with the help of the NUS student unions - about half of all TJJF clubs in the UK are based at a university. In 2005 the Randori and Atemi National competitions gained recognition from BUCS - then British Universities Sports Association. Gareth Horgan, Acting Tertiary Fellow, is the British Ju Jitsu Association Governing Body's "Universities Ju Jitsu Representative", highlighting the contribution that TJJF makes to Jiu Jitsu as a whole in the UK.

=== Branch lineages ===
Several instructors who have previously been members of TJJF have gone on to form their own schools, these are listed below;

- In 1993 some members of The Jiu Jitsu Foundation formed their own group, The East Midlands Jiu Jitsu Association (EMJJA) and began practising the same style, later this segmented off to be known (from 1995) as Aiuchi Jiu Jitsu, headed by Sensei Julian Straker-Jones and Sensei Simon Parker-Lehanne, both TJJF 3rd Dans at the time. In a grading overseen by Shihan Matt Komp, Sensei Straker-Jones was promoted to 4th dan in 2001, and to 5th Dan at the Cardiff Nationals in 2005 by a panel of Aiuchi 3rd Dans. Aiuchi Jiu Jitsu Association has a number of clubs around the country, based in Basingstoke, Bedford, Cardiff, Derby, Keele, Leicester, London, Swindon, Thatcham and Winchester. The two styles (TJJF and Aiuchi) practise similar styles under different names, although Aiuchi Jiu Jitsu utilises different names for similar techniques. Aiuchi Jiu Jitsu encourages members to test their techniques through experimentation. The tori and uke work together. This helps develop trust and compassion. More information about the Aiuchi Jiu Jitsu Association can be found at their website .
- In 1995 Chris Spencer, who had been training with TJJF for 12 years emigrated from London to Finland. There he created a new style named Liikan Jitsu, which was based mainly on Shorinji Kan Jiu Jitsu but also on a variety of other martial arts he had studied, including Eskrima and Kung Fu
- In 1998 Richard Catterick founded the style Seishin Mizu Ryu Tatakai Jutsu (SMRTJ). He had previously been a member and instructor for the TJJF and Aiuchi Jiu Jitsu (AJJ). SMRTJ have 7 accredited adult and 3 accredited children's branch dojo, all in the UK. They are also members of the British JuJitsu Association (governing body for JuJitsu in the UK)
- In 2012 Paul Lemar, a TJJF 3rd Dan, left the foundation and founded Pure Jiu Jitsu in Tunbridge Wells, England.

== Technical aspects ==
Techniques aim to utilise the use of the attackers' energy, momentum, size and weight to assert an advantage to the defender. This allows a small and weak jitsuka (student of jujutsu) to defeat a much bigger and stronger attacker by the application of strikes, locks, throws and iimmobilisations Apart from the inevitable variations in technique that happen over time, TJJF principles are in line with most modern practitioners of judo and jujutsu, with hip throws forming the basis of nage waza. These hip throws are similar to those found in the modernisation of Japanese martial arts in the late 19th and early 20th century and are as such distinct from the balance taking of older Japanese arts, or kobudo.

Punches are taught in such a way to have often already surrendered the balance of the attacker. This is supposed to simulate the "committed punch". However, many older Japanese budo styles have systems of striking which purposefully do not commit, and so break one's own balance, until assured of reasonable success. Counters to these more sophisticated attacks are reserved for senior grade syllabi, in contrast to training traditional Jiu Jitsu styles in Japan where the emphasis is placed on a philosophy of immersion for all students.

When testing a students technical skills, TJJF prefers quantity over quality and high speed. The students are often placed in situations involving a high volume of attacks from multiple ukes in which the student must deal with the attacks very quickly before the next attack.

== Grade structure ==
TJJF has adopted the common practice of a Kyū (coloured belt) grade system as opposed to the traditional white (novice) and black (competent) system. As a result, any instructor visiting a club at which they do not train or teach regularly, can gauge the level of competence of those he or she is about to instruct, and will choose techniques at a level appropriate to the grades present.

TJJF has 8 coloured belts. The first two grades 7th and 6th kyu contain sub grades which TJJF refer to as "mons". When graded for 7th and 6th kyu, the examining panel will decide if the candidate has passed and whether it was a pass, a good pass, an excellent pass or an exceptional pass. A pass is signified by a plain belt. However, 1, 2 or 3 mons (tags added to the belt) represent good, excellent or exceptional performance in the grading respectively, which are displayed by using the appropriate number of ribbons of the following belt's colour around the end of the belt. The belt is then worn so that the mons are displayed on the wearer's left. Subsequent grades are either passed or failed: the mon system is not used. Mons are given to the lower grades because there is a much greater variation in skill and ability between jitsuka of 7th kyu and of 6th kyu, than there is between jitsuka of the higher grades. Nevertheless, it is possible for a candidate to these higher grades to obtain the status of 'top-grade' (such as top-green, top-purple or top-blue) when his or her performance at the grading is considered superior to that of other candidates.

The order of belts in TJJF are: White (Novice or 8th Kyu), Yellow (7th Kyu), Orange (6th Kyu), Green (5th Kyu), Purple (4th Kyu), Light Blue (3rd Kyu), Dark Blue (2nd Kyu), Brown (1st Kyu), followed by the Dan grades, (see below).

Low grades learn the very basic principles of the TJJF system. Movement and posture are important early on, as the basic foundation with which to build more advanced techniques later. The jitsuka is taught to defend and disarm against weapon attacks, where appropriate. Intermediate grades develop the lessons learned earlier and add variations to those techniques. The more senior students are encouraged to assist in instruction: to attain 4th Kyu or above there are teaching requirements in addition to the technical requirements. From 1st Kyu and above, jitsuka who are teaching as full Club Instructors ('Acting Primary or Primary Trainer') wear Hakama to denote their instructor rank.

Note that this differs from the grading system used by many other martial arts in the UK: TJJF uses two blue grades, dark blue and light blue (2nd and 3rd kyu, respectively) which are more senior than purple (4th kyu) whereas other styles often have a single blue grade (3rd kyu) junior to purple (2nd kyu).

Note: Juniors (17 & Under) have a contrasting belt, with a white stripe running the length of the belt. Junior Novices have a white belt with a red mon at each end. Juniors are not allowed to be taught the Atemi Kata at Novice level.

=== Dan grades ===
The TJJF Dan Grade system was updated in 2018 to a Yudansha (10 level) system to align with international standards, with further amendments to belts and badges in 2024. Promotion within the Dan grade system requires a combination of physical gradings and involvement in the administrative running of the association at either regional or national level.

- 1st Dan - Shodan

Club Instructor: black belt, hakama, white Jitsu badge with black writing.

- 1st Dan - Senior Shodan

Club & Assistant Regional Instructor: black belt, hakama, black Jitsu badge with white writing.

- 2nd Dan - Nidan

Regional Instructor: black belt, hakama, white Jitsu badge with red writing.

- 3rd Dan - Sandan

Regional & National Instructor: black belt, hakama, black waistcoat, black Jitsu badge with red writing.

- 4th Dan - Yondan

National Instructor & Regional Examiner: black belt, hakama, black waistcoat, red Jitsu badge with white writing.

- 5th Dan - Godan

National Instructor & Examiner: black belt, hakama, black over-gi, red Jitsu badge with white writing.

- 6th Dan - Rokyudan

National Instructor & Examiner: black or red and white striped belt, hakama, black over-gi, red Jitsu badge with white writing.

- 7th Dan - Nanadan

National Instructor & Examiner: black or red and white striped belt, hakama, black over-gi, red Jitsu badge with white writing.

- 8th Dan - Hachidan

National Instructor & Examiner: black or red and white striped belt, hakama, black over-gi, red Jitsu badge with white writing.

- 9th Dan - Kudan

National Instructor & Examiner: red belt, hakama, black over-gi, red Jitsu badge with white writing.

- 10th Dan - Jūdan

National Instructor & Examiner: red belt, hakama, customised over-gi, red Jitsu badge with white writing.

Junior Dans (17 and under) have the white stripe on all belts and can be awarded their hakama on completion of passing a "hakama course" which is held at the Junior Nationals. All junior Dan students must have attended their Assistant Instructor, Instructor, Club Instructor, First Aid, and Town club courses held at junior events and there is also a minimum two-year gap from junior brown belt to junior black belt. Most junior dans are around 14–18 years of age and have been practising Jiu Jitsu for more than 6 or 7 years. Junior Dans are not insured to teach their own club; an adult Acting Primary or above must be present at all sessions. Juniors Dans must retake their 1st Kyu grading after their 18th birthday and then fulfil the two-year wait, including 1 year teaching, requirements before they are eligible for Shodan again.

== Uniform and customs ==
Jitsuka wear a plain white or blue keikogi, usually referred to simply as a gi, which can either be a standard judogi or something slightly lighter. Very light gis such as those used in karate are not worn as they are susceptible to damage during groundwork or when using certain throws. A coloured belt is worn according to grade, as described above. In The U.K, Kyu grades wear a square badge with a white background, black surround, and the word 'Jiu Jitsu' in black, on the upper right arm. Dan grades wear different colour badges as described in the Dan grades section above. The badges vary in other countries, usually reflecting the country of the student.

It is customary to rei (bow) towards the middle of the dojo (training hall) as one enters or leaves it. When stepping on or off the training mat the jitsuka rei to the highest grade currently on the mat or the middle of the mat if it is empty. Also at the beginning and end of the session students line up facing the sensei (teachers). The sensei calls out kiba dachi (horse riding stance), su dachi (standing with feet together), and suwaru (kneeling position). The highest non-teacher grade calls out sensei ni rei, whereupon students bow. The use of sensei ni rei is used as the highest grade currently attainable within The Jitsu Foundation is Tertiary Fellow. Since a Third Dan Tertiary Fellow is still referred to as Sensei, sensei ni rei is used. However, when Shihan Brian Graham was present on the mat, the call of shihan ni rei would have been used in respect of his sixth Dan grade and title of Shihan. The highest-ranked teacher then calls otagai ni rei and the teachers bow. Before and after training with each other during the session individual pairs of jitsuka also bow to each other. This bowing is not a bow of submission, obeisance, or homage. Rather it is one of mutual respect, forgiveness for any discomfort caused and thanks for the learning experience (Instructors learn too).

== National events ==
=== Atemi nationals ===
This is an annual two-day event in Sheffield, UK but has previously been held in Birmingham, Telford, Slough and Manchester. Usually taking place in November, courses in the morning and competitions in the afternoon are held for each grade level. There are two phases to the competition. Firstly in the 'V', competitors must defend themselves, using any techniques that they have learned, against a continuous cycle of attackers either unarmed, or armed with weaponry appropriate to the grade of the defender. This is followed by a 'gauntlet'. In this phase, the competitor has a chance to perform techniques without the pressure of a realistic 'combat' situation, however the competitor is expected to demonstrate control, skill, and fluidity. The 'V' focuses on the "martial" or fighting aspect of jujutsu, whereas the 'gauntlet' examines the "art" aspect. The competition uses a points-based system judged by a panel who assess technical ability, style and effectiveness of techniques. The event is held over two days, with heats on day one and finals on day two. Day two also includes the 'open grade' category, which any senior grade can enter.

Gold, Silver and bronze medals are awarded to the top three competitors in each of the categories, while the top three competitors in the open are typically awarded trophies. In addition, each club is awarded points for the medals achieved by its members, and a prestigious club shield trophy is presented to the club that tallies the most points. The Atemi nationals club shield was most recently won by The University of Edinburgh in 2025.

The Jitsu Foundation Juniors hold the same type of event at the National Judo Centre, Birmingham.

=== Randori nationals ===
TJJF also run annual Judo competitions for its members, currently held in Northampton, UK. Usually taking place in March, courses and competitions are held for each grade level, with those who also hold Judo grades competing at a higher level. At the Randori nationals, grades have a choice of two competitions. In ground fighting (newaza), competitors must try to achieve a pin or submission, whilst on the ground, over a 2-minute bout. In standing fighting (nagewaza), the first to score a full point (Ippon), with any throwing technique, is the winner. Due to the nature of these contests, the competitors are placed in weight, sex and grade categories. The second day hosts the finals and open competition, which is itself a full 'judo rules' competition that allows both standing and ground fighting in the same contest. In the open competition, it is very difficult to score an Ippon, compared to real Judo, and most fights end on the ground.

As in the Atemi nationals, medals are awarded to the top three competitors in each of the categories and each club is awarded points for the medals achieved by its members. A prestigious club shield trophy is presented to the club that tallies the most points. The Randori nationals club shield was most recently won by University of Birmingham Jitsu club in February 2019.

The Jitsu Foundation Juniors hold the same type of event at the National Judo Centre, Birmingham.

These two events form the highlights of TJJF year for most jitsuka. Both competition events have now been recognized by BUCS, and competitors can earn points for their respective universities, if applicable.

=== Summer Ball ===
Held in July, after the end of the academic year, the Summer Ball is the final event of the Jitsu calendar. It is held in different locations, depending on circumstances:

- 2004 in Plymouth, celebrating 25 years of the first Jitsu Club opened by Peter Farrar.
- 2005 in Bristol, marking the 20-year anniversary for the founding of the Region.
- 2006 in London, marking the 20-year anniversary for the founding of the Region.
- 2007 in Keighley, Yorkshire, marking 40 years of Jitsu where Graham founded the Style.
- 2008 in Edinburgh.
- 2009 in Manchester.
- 2010 in Birmingham.
- 2011 in Guildford.
- 2012 in Bath.
- 2013 in Sheffield.
- 2014 in London.
- 2015 in Leeds.
- 2016 in Bristol.
- 2017 in Southampton.
- 2018 in Sheffield.
- 2019 in Nottingham.
- 2020-2021 was cancelled due to the Covid-19 pandemic.
- 2022 in Bath.
- 2023 in Guildford.
- 2024 in Sheffield.

Although a smaller affair than the two National competitions, it is nonetheless important, as it also hosts the Shodan, Nidan and Sandan (1st-3rd Dan) gradings. The evening dinner has an awards ceremony to congratulate the successful candidates and other individuals who have made significant contributions to the style over the last year.

== International events ==
International courses take place every three years in a different country outside of the UK, providing an opportunity for jitsuka in clubs around the world to gather and train together. This provides overseas Jiu Jitsu organisations the opportunity to host large numbers of jitsuka for a series of seminars taught by leading local and international instructors. The first international course was held in Peterborough, Ontario, Canada in 2003, followed by Amsterdam in 2006, Spartanburg, South Carolina USA in 2009, Edinburgh, UK in 2013, Collingwood Canada in 2016, Drakensberg, South Africa in 2019, and Vienna, Austria in 2023, and the next one will be held in Buenos Aires, Argentina in 2026.
