= Nai Talim =

Principle which states that knowledge and work are not separate

The principal idea is to impart the whole education of the body, mind and soul through the handicraft that is taught to the children.

— Mahatma Gandhi

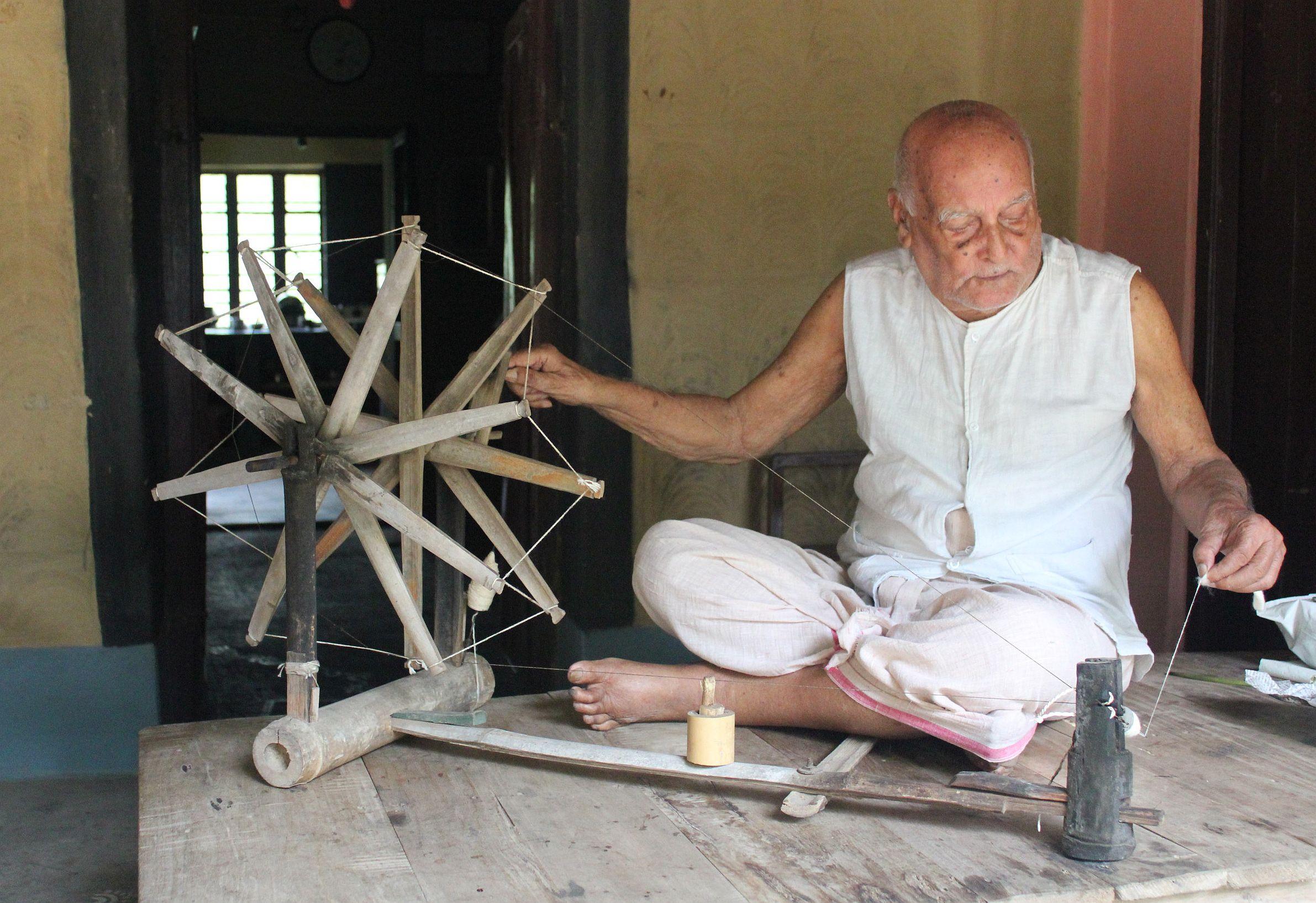
In 1940 Shri Chitta Bhusan, hardcore Gandhian freedom fighter and follower of 'Basic Education', came to a remote village named Majhihira in the then Manbhum district of Bihar (now in West Bengal), where he founded the Majhihira National Basic Education Institution (MNBEI). He took his last breath on 7th February 2016 at 101 years old. He enjoyed a simple life and used a Charkha.

Nai Talim, or Basic Education, is a principle which states that knowledge and work are not separate. Mahatma Gandhi promoted an educational curriculum with the same name based on this pedagogical principle.

It can be translated with the phrase 'Basic Education for all'. However, the concept has several layers of meaning. It developed out of Gandhi's experience with the English educational system and with colonialism in general. In that system, he saw that Indian children would be alienated and 'career-based thinking' would become dominant. In addition, it embodied a series of negative outcomes: the disdain for manual work, the development of a new elite class, and the increasing problems of industrialization and urbanization.

The three pillars of Gandhi's pedagogy were its focus on the lifelong character of education, its social character and its form as a holistic process. For Gandhi, education is 'the moral development of the person', a process that is by definition 'lifelong'.

== Education ==
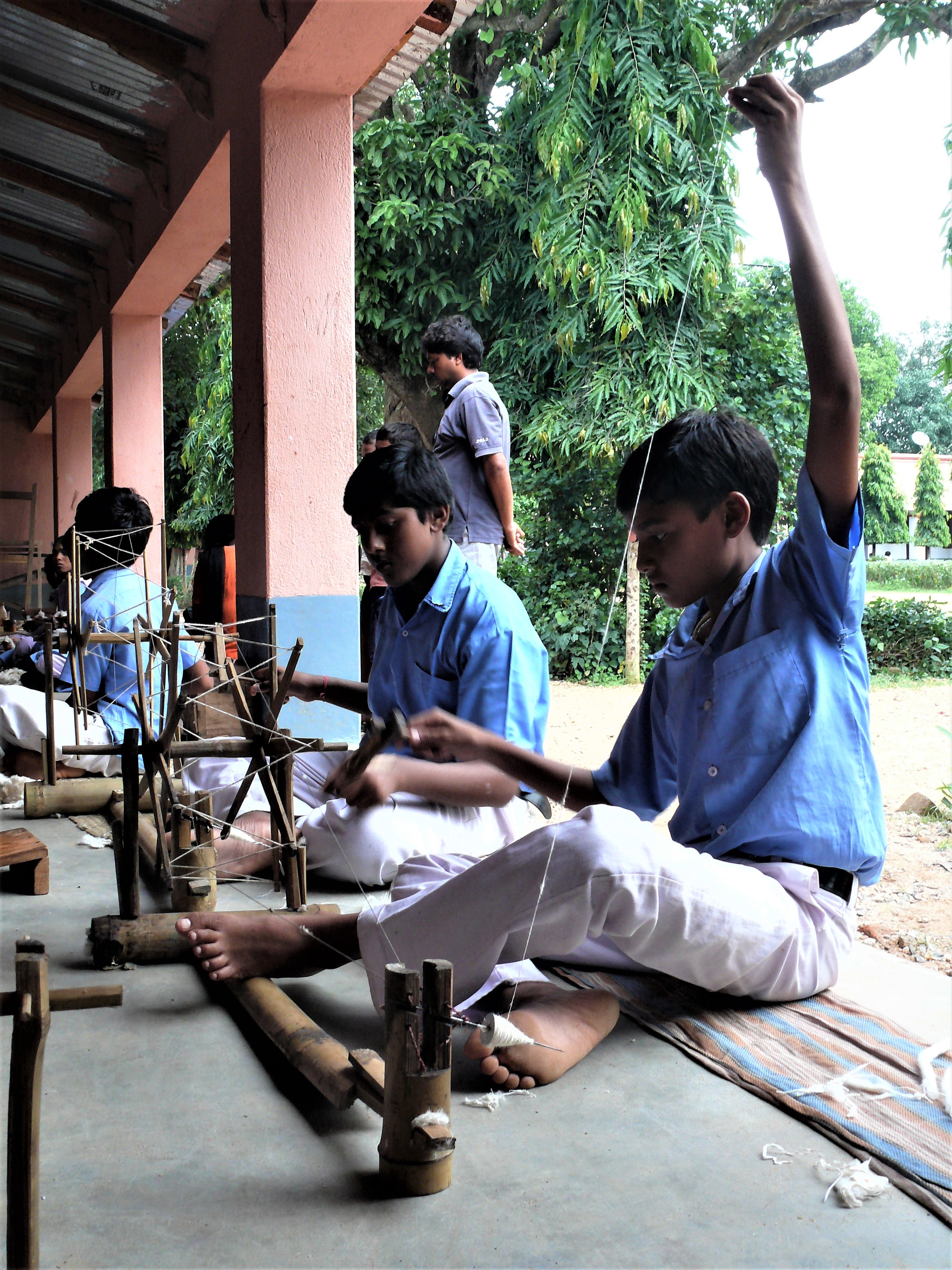
Spinning wheel represents Swadeshi and self sufficiency - Nai Talim-a basic education system A concept by Mahatma Gandhi implemented at Majhihira, Purulia- August 2011

Gandhi's model of education was directed toward his alternative vision of the social order: "Gandhi's basic education was, therefore, an embodiment of his perception of an ideal society consisting of small, self-reliant communities with his ideal citizen being an industrious, self-respecting and generous individual living in a small cooperative community. Nai Talim also envisaged a different role for the new teacher, not simply as a professional constrained by curricula and abstract standards, but rather as a person relating directly to the student in the form of a dialogue: "A teacher who establishes rapport with the taught, becomes one with them, learns more from them than he teaches them. He who learns nothing from his disciples is, in my opinion, worthless. Whenever I talk with someone I learn from him. I take from him more than I give him. In this way, a true teacher regards himself as a student of his students. If you will teach your pupils with this attitude, you will benefit much from them."

Gandhi's disciple, Vinobha Bhave, developed the idea further as a means of social transformation: "The crux of Nai Talim lay in overcoming distinctions between learning and teaching, and knowledge and work. Vinoba discusses the need to redefine the relationship between teacher and student, "they must each regard the other as a fellow worker..." Instead, the 'teacher' was to be skilled in a kala/hunar (and to derive sustenance from this and not a teaching salary). The student was to live, work and grow with the teacher and his/her family. In this process s/he would learn the kala/hunar — the skill as part of a way of life, code of ethics, web of relationships, etc.". Finally, Buniyadi shiksha was conceived as a response to one of the main dialectics of modernity as Gandhi saw it--the dialectic between human being and 'machine' or 'technology': "In this dialectic, man represented the whole of mankind, not just India, and the machine represented the industrialized West." It is for this reason, among others, that Gandhi placed such central emphasis in his pedagogy on the role of handcrafts such as weaving, metal work, pottery, spinning; they symbolized the values of self-sufficiency or Swaraj and independence or Swadeshi.

== Handicrafts ==
Traditional and colonial forms of education had emphasized literacy and abstract, text-based knowledge which had been the domain of the upper castes. Gandhi's proposal to make handicrafts the centre of his pedagogy had as its aim to bring about a "radical restructuring of the sociology of school knowledge in India" in which the 'literacies' of the lower castes--"such as spinning, weaving, leatherwork, pottery, metal-work, basket-making and book-binding"—would be made central. The other aim of this use of handicrafts was to make schools financially and socially independent of the state—an even more radical concept. Thus in his influential article on education in Harijan in 1937 he argued: "By education I mean an all-round drawing out of the best in child and man-body, mind and spirit. Literacy is not the end of education nor even the beginning. It is only one of the means by which man and woman can be educated. Literacy in itself is no education. I would therefore begin the child's education by teaching it a useful handicraft and enabling it to produce from the moment it begins its training. Thus every school can be made self-supporting."

== History ==
Gandhi's first experiments in education began at the Tolstoy Farm ashram in South Africa. It was much later, while living at Sevagram and in the heat of the Independence struggle, that Gandhi wrote his influential article in Harijan about education. In it, he mapped out the basic pedagogy:

I hold that the highest development of the mind and the soul is possible under such a system of education. Only every handicraft has to be taught not merely mechanically as is done today, but scientifically i.e. the child should know the why and wherefore of every process....I have myself taught sandal- making and even spinning on these lines with good results. This method does not exclude a knowledge of history and geography. But I find that this is best taught by transmitting such general information By word of mouth. One imparts ten times as much in this manner as by reading and writing. The signs of the alphabet may be taught later...Of course, the pupil learns mathematics through his handicraft. I attach the greatest importance to primary education, which according to my conception should be equal to the present matriculation less English...."Harijan of the 31st July 1937 "

A national education conference was held at Wardha on 22–23 October 1937. Afterwards two model schools were opened at Wardha and nearby Segaon. Post-basic education and pre-basic education schools were developed after Gandhi's death.

The National Planning Commission set up by the central government expressed its opposition to Gandhi's vision of Basic Education on several grounds. The Nehru government's vision of an industrialized, centrally planned economy had no place for 'basic education' or self-supported schools, rather it reflected the "vision of a powerful and growing class of industrialists, their supporters in politics and intellectuals with high qualifications in different areas, including science and technology." A further detailed history of the attempts to implement basic education in India is given by Marjorie Sykes, The History of Nai Talim. Finally, as has been noted by Krishna Kumar, "the implementation of Gandhi's plan could not survive the 'development decade' of the 1960s when the Indian economy and its politics entered into a new phase featuring the penetration of Indian agriculture by the advanced economies of the West and the centralization of power."

== Quotations ==
“Basic education links the children, whether of cities or the villages, to all that is best and lasting in us.”

“The principal idea is to impart the whole education of the body, mind and soul through the handicraft that is taught to the children.”

–Mahatma Gandhi

“An education which does not teach us to discriminate between good and bad, to assimilate the one and eschew the other, is a misnomer.”

–Mahatma Gandhi

“The aim of university education should be to turn out true servants of the people who will live and die for the country's freedom.”

–Mahatma Gandhi

“The schools and colleges are really a factory for turning out clerks for Government.”

–Mahatma Gandhi

“The real difficulty is that people have no idea of what education truly is. We assess the value of education in the same manner as we assess the value of land or of shares in the stock-exchange market. We want to provide only such education as would enable the student to earn more. We hardly give any thought to the improvement of the character of the educated. The girls, we say, do not have to earn; so why should they be educated? As long as such ideas persist there is no hope of our ever knowing the true value of education.”

–M. K. Gandhi, True Education on the NCTE site

== See also ==
- Basic Education
- Gandhigram Rural Institute
- Mahatma Gandhi
