= St. Matthew's Episcopal Church =

St. Matthew's Episcopal Church may refer to:

In the United States (ordered by state and city)

- St. Matthew's Episcopal Church (National City, California), listed on the National Register of Historic Places in San Diego County, California
- St. Matthew's Episcopal Church (Waimanalo, Hawaii), an Episcopal church in Waimanalo, Hawaii on the island of Oahu
- St. Matthew's by the Bridge Episcopal Church, listed on the National Register of Historic Places in Hardin County, Iowa
- St. Matthew's Episcopal Church (Houma, Louisiana), listed on the National Register of Historic Places in Terrebonne Parish, Louisiana
- St. Matthew's Episcopal Church (Hallowell, Maine), an Episcopal church in Hallowell, Maine
- St. Matthew's Episcopal Church (Worcester, Massachusetts), an Episcopal church in Worcester, Massachusetts
- St. Matthew's Episcopal Church, Moravia, New York, NRHP-listed in Church Street–Congress Street Historic District
- St. Matthew's Episcopal Church (Woodhaven, New York), listed on the National Register of Historic Places in Queens County, New York
- St. Matthew's Episcopal Church and Churchyard, Hillsborough, North Carolina, listed on the National Register of Historic Places in Orange County, North Carolina
- St. Matthew's Episcopal Church (Barrington, Rhode Island), listed on the National Register of Historic Places in Bristol County, Rhode Island
- St. Matthew's Episcopal Church (Covington, Tennessee), listed on the National Register of Historic Places in Tipton County, Tennessee
- St. Matthew's Episcopal Church (Charleston, West Virginia)
- St. Matthew's Episcopal Church (Kenosha, Wisconsin), listed on the National Register of Historic Places in Kenosha County, Wisconsin

== See also ==
- St. Matthias Episcopal Church (disambiguation)
