= St. Matthias' Church, Vepery =

Church in Chennai, India

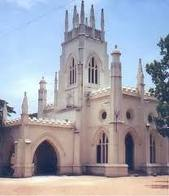

C.S.I. St. Matthias' Church is a Protestant church situated in the neighbourhood of Vepery in Chennai, India. The church was constructed and consecrated in 1823.

== History ==
C.S.I. St. Matthias' Church had its origins in a private chapel, the Chapel of Our Lady of Miracles, owned by the Armenian merchant Coja Petrus Uscan. In November 1752, years after Uscan's death, the chapel was obtained by SPCK, the Danish Protestant mission from Tranquebar for Rs. 50,000. The SPCK renamed the chapel as St. Matthias' Church. The church was consecrated in 1823.
