= Vepery =

- Neighbourhood
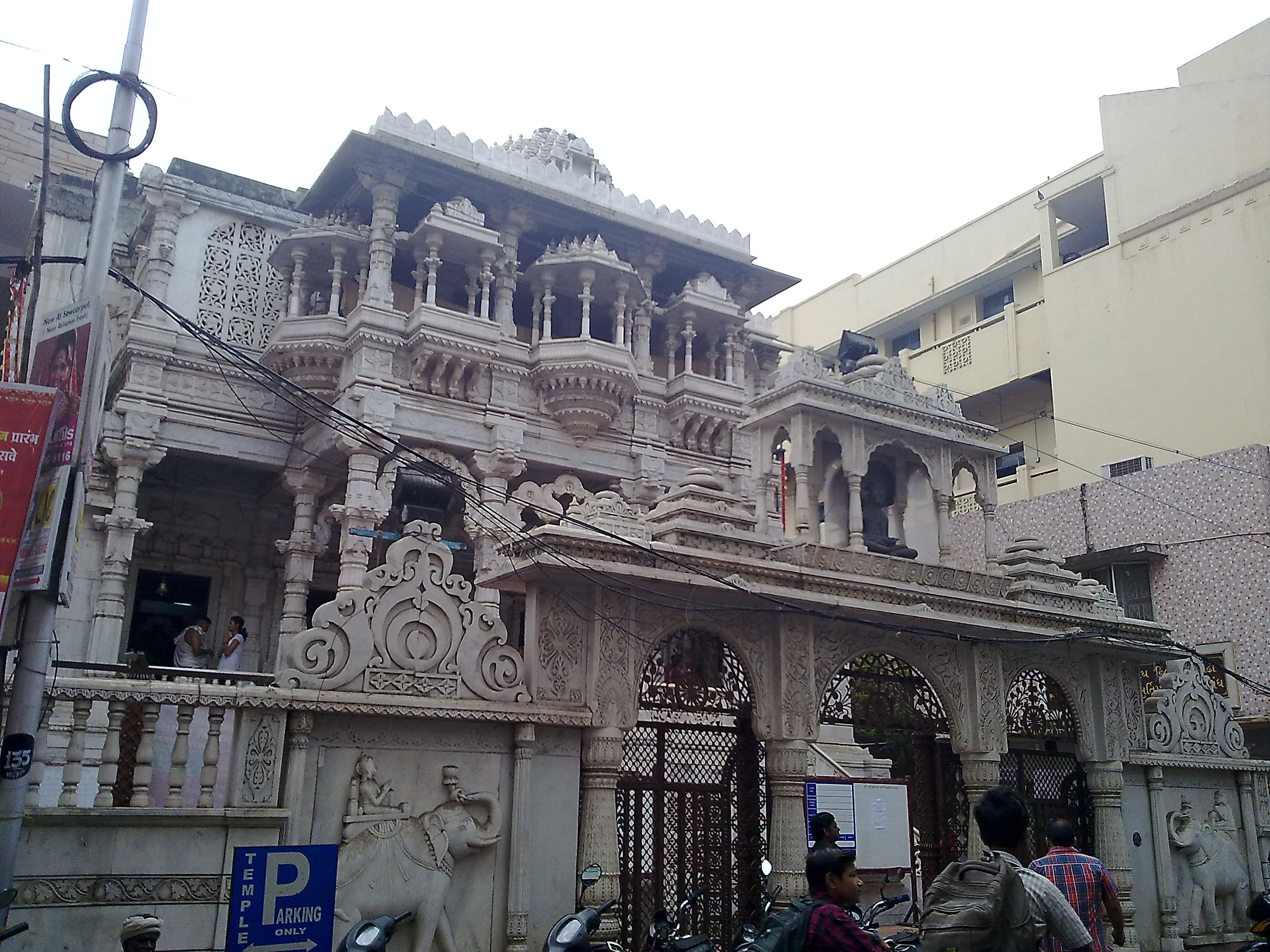
- Shwetambar Jain temple

- Location within Chennai Location within Tamil Nadu Location within India
- Coordinates: 13°5′1″N 80°15′52″E
- Country: India
- State: Tamil Nadu
- District: Chennai District
- Metro: Chennai
- Talukas: Fort-Tondiarpet

Government
  - Body: Chennai Corporation

Languages
  - Official: Tamil
- Time zone: UTC+5:30 (IST)
- PIN: 600 007
- Lok Sabha constituency: Chennai North
- Planning agency: CMDA
- Civic agency: Chennai Corporation
- Website: www.chennai.tn.nic.in

Vepery is a neighbourhood in the north of Chennai, India. Abutting the transportation hub of Park Town, the neighbourhood covers a rectangular area north of the Poonamallee High Road.

== History ==
Vepery is among those oldest neighbourhoods developed during the British settlement in the city of Madras. Christian missionaries started arriving in the neighbourhood as early as 1749, soon after the treaty of Aix la Chapelle when the city was restored to the British from the French. The Vepery Mission is the oldest mission connected with the Church of England in India.

In 1828, St. Matthias Church was built, making it the second oldest Anglican Church after St. Mary's Church at Fort St. George. The church was officially consecrated on St. Matthias day in 1842 by the officiating Bishop Spencer of Madras.

On 1 March 1855, the Madras Parental Academic Institution and Doveton College were established at Vepery within the local limits of the then city of Madras. The surrounding area of Doveton acquired its name after Capt. John Doveton, who served as a captain commandant of the Seventh Regiment of Infantry.

== Landmarks ==
Major landmarks include:

- Periyar Thidal
- Office of the Commissioner of Police
- Society for Prevention of Cruelty to Animals (SPCA)
- Doveton Tower Clock
- Vepery Police Station
- Sambhavnath Jain temple

== Educational Institutions ==
=== Colleges ===
- Madras Veterinary College
- P.T.Lee Chengalvaraya Naicker Polytechnic College
- St. Christopher's College of Education
- Guru Shree Shanthivijai Jain College For Women

=== Schools ===
- St. Matthias Anglo Indian Higher Secondary School
- The Doveton Corrie Group of Schools comprising the Doveton Girls' Higher Secondary School, the Doveton Boys' Higher Secondary School, the Doveton Matriculation Higher Secondary School, which is co- educational School and the Doveton Oakley School for kindergarten education.
- Bentinck Higher Secondary School for Girls
- St. Joseph Anglo Indian Boys Higher Secondary School
- St Aloysius Anglo Indian Girls Higher Secondary School
- St. Pauls Higher Secondary School
- Seventh Day Adventist Matriculation Higher Secondary School
- Baynes Memorial Baptist Church School
- Guru Shree Shantivijay Jain Vidyalaya

== Roads and Streets ==
Important roads and streets include :

- Vepery High Road
- Jermiah Road
- Barracks Road
- EVK Sampath Road
- Maddox Street
- Brethapeat Road
- Vepery Church Road
- Atkinson Road
- Ritherdon Road
