= St. Matthias Episcopal Church (Waukesha, Wisconsin) =

Historic church in Wisconsin, United States

- U.S. National Register of Historic Places
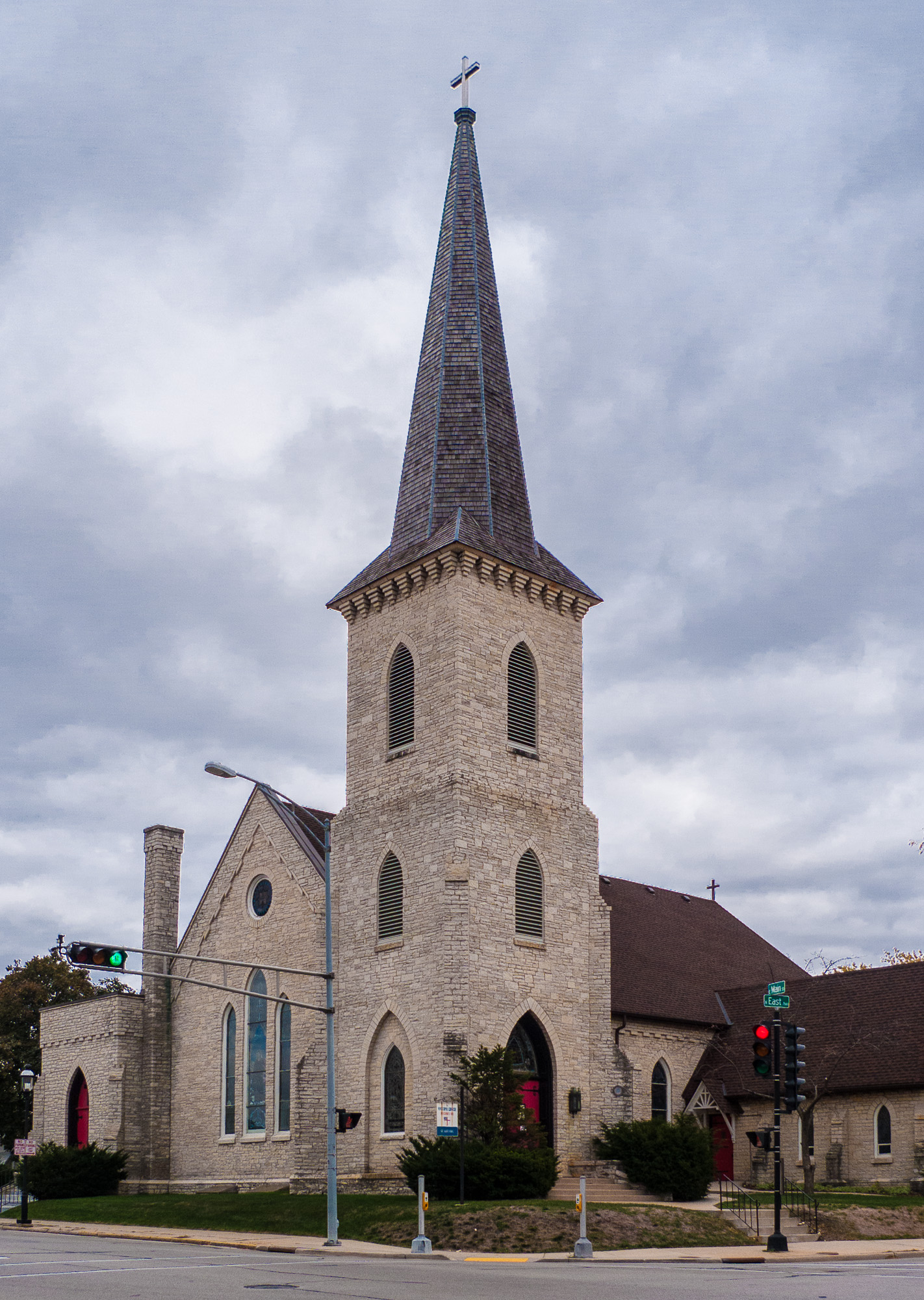
- In 2012

- Location within Wisconsin Location within the United States
- Location: 111 E. Main St., Waukesha, Wisconsin
- Coordinates: 43°0′46″N 88°13′36″W
- Area: 3.4 acres (1.4 ha)
- Built: 1851
- Architect: Eales & Dresden
- Architectural style: Gothic Revival
- MPS: Waukesha MRA
- NRHP reference No.: 83004356
- Added to NRHP: October 28, 1983

St. Matthias Episcopal Church is a Gothic Revival-styled limestone-clad church built from 1851 to 1855 in Waukesha, Wisconsin. It was built by St. Matthias parish of the Episcopal Church, now in the Episcopal Diocese of Wisconsin, and is the oldest church building in Waukesha that survives basically intact. It had been in the jurisdiction of the Episcopal Diocese of Milwaukee.

The Waukesha congregation began in 1839 or 1840 when the Rev. Lemuel B. Hull of St. Paul's in Milwaukee walked out into the wilds to conduct the first Episcopal services there. In 1843 those early Episcopalians built a little chapel on Barstow Street. In 1844 the parish was formally organized with the Rev. James Lloyd Breck as the first rector. Breck was invited to choose the patron saint of the church. In 1848 the Rev. James Abercrombie became rector.

In 1851 the parish began constructing the large limestone-clad building that still stands today. The cornerstone was laid that year with initial pledges of $1,000, but that proved insufficient, and Abercrombie had to go back east for $4,000 more for the building. The building's style is Gothic Revival, with its emphasis on the vertical clear in the spire and the pointed arches topping the windows and doorways. The walls are of local limestone, dressed, and randomly coursed. The main entrance is through the corner tower. The tower is square, with the lower parts flanked by diagonal buttresses, and the top capped with a spire that rises to a cross.

A side-chapel was added to the building in 1887, built by Eales and Dresden.

On October 28, 1983, the church was added to the National Register of Historic Places as an exemplar of Gothic Revival style in Waukesha and for its fine stonework.
