= St Matthias, Bristol =

Building in Bristol, England

St Matthias
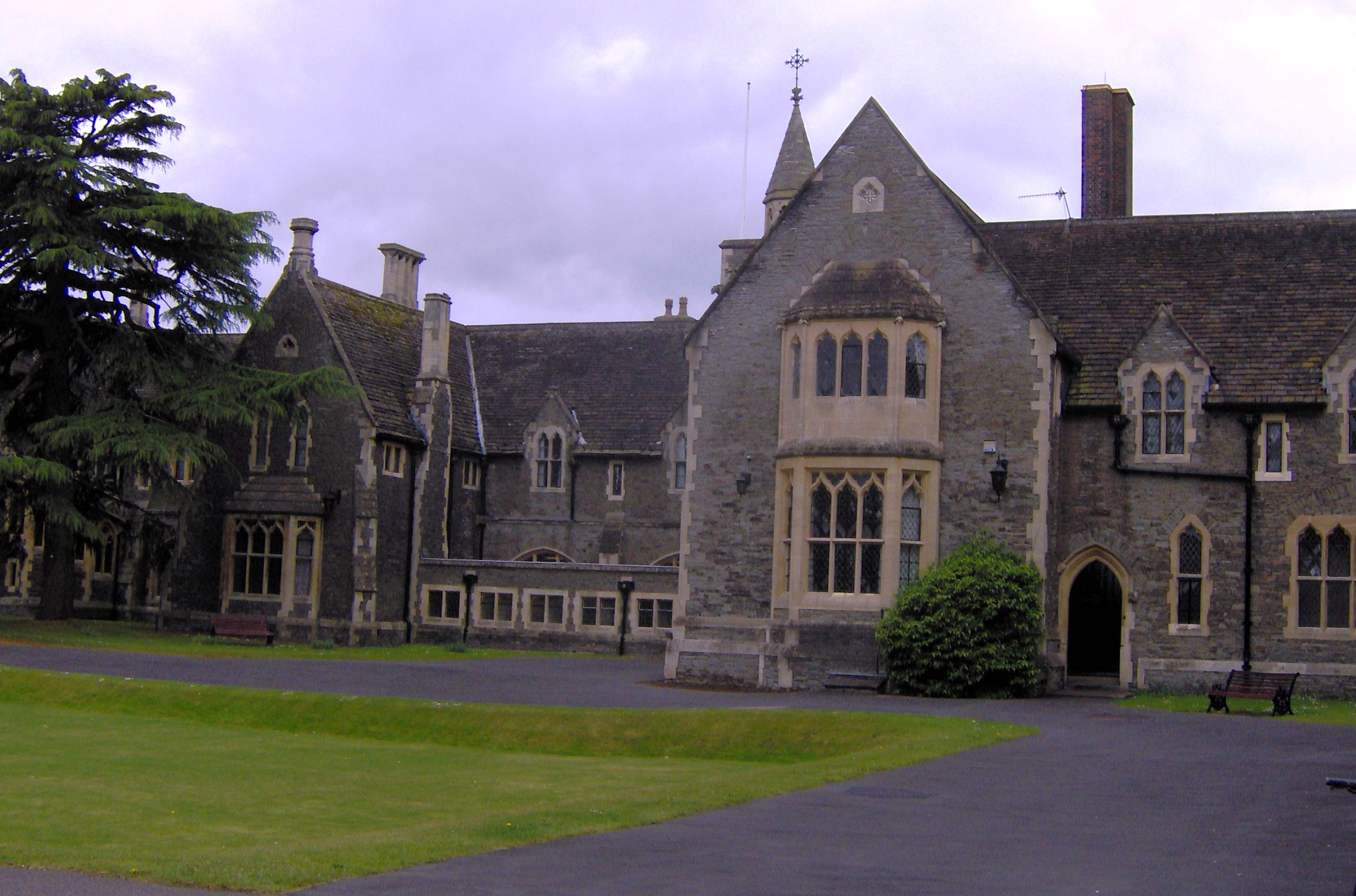

- Location within Bristol

General information
- Architectural style: Gothic Revival
- Location: Bristol, England
- Coordinates: 51.4845°N 2.5299°W
- Construction started: 1851
- Completed: 1852

Design and construction
- Architect: John Bevan

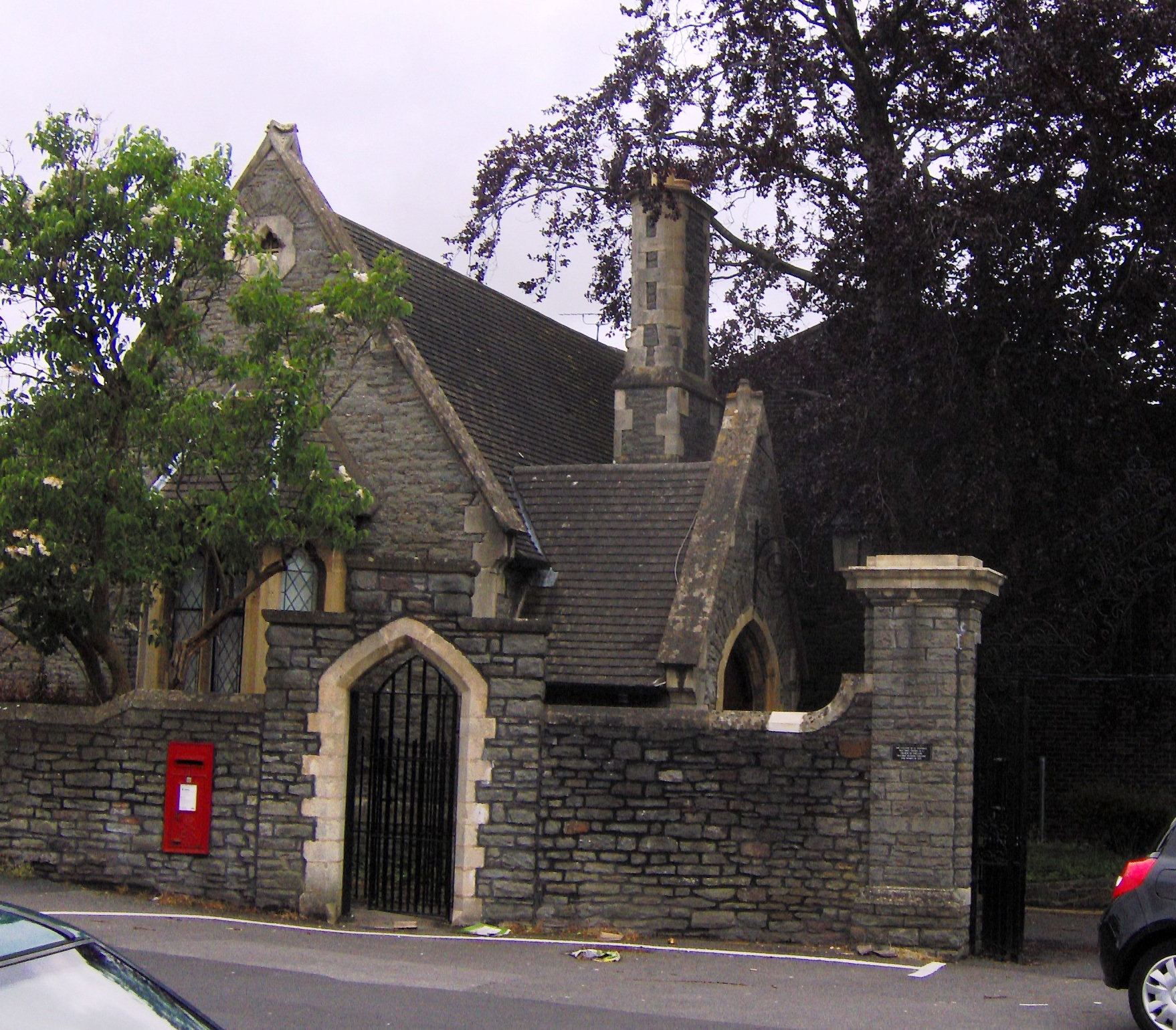
The Lodge at St Mattias

St Matthias (known colloquially as St Matts) used to belong to the University of the West of England. The campus is located in the suburb of Fishponds in Bristol.

== History ==
The campus was previously a teacher training college, originally called the Gloucester and Bristol Diocesan Training Institution for School Mistresses, which opened in 1853 and was later the humanities campus for UWE Bristol. As part of a project dedicated to the history of the campus, staff and students both past and present, share their memories of their time on campus.

The original buildings were constructed in 1851–2 by John Bevan with Jonathan Clarke, in a Gothic Revival style. The building was extended in 1903. Today it is a grade II* listed building and the lodge is listed grade II.

== Archives ==
Records of the Bristol Diocesan Training College, later St Matthias' College, are held at Bristol Archives (Ref. 37168) (online catalogue) and (Ref. BROFA/0078) (online catalogue).

== Departments and courses ==
St Matthias was home to departments within the faculty of Creative Arts, Humanities and Education, including:

- Department of Culture, Media and Drama
- Department of History, Philosophy and Politics
- Department of English, Linguistics and Communication.

In addition, the Department of Psychology was housed at the campus, before staff, students and laboratories were moved to the Frenchay campus. The move was made in order to join the other departments in the Faculty of Applied Sciences.

== Buildings and facilities ==
The campus has some Victorian Gothic buildings, and is set around a quad.

== Closure ==
The University of the West of England closed the campus in September 2014 (with operations on the site ceasing on 4 July 2014) as a part of a relocation project. The various departments of the faculty of Creative Arts, Humanities and Education from St Matthias and Bower Ashton have moved to new facilities at Frenchay campus. As part of the planned closure UWE and the UWE Students' Union held a 3-day farewell party to celebrate the campus, its history, staff, ex- staff, students and alumni.

In March 2014 it was announced that, subject to planning permission, the site would be sold and redeveloped by Barratt Developments for housing and the listed buildings would become a Steiner School.
