= St. Matthias Episcopal Church (Asheville, North Carolina) =

Historic church in North Carolina, United States

- U.S. National Register of Historic Places
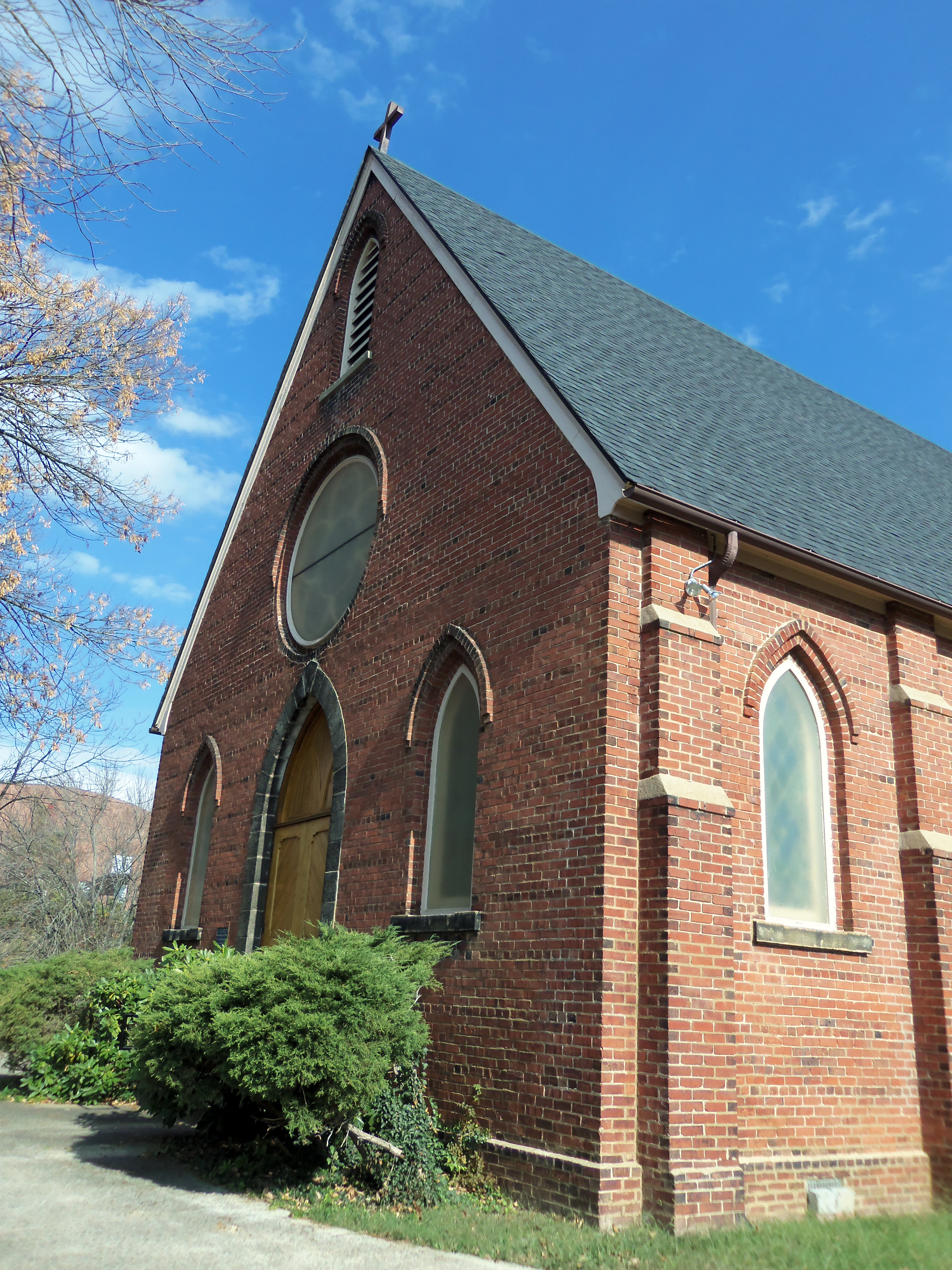
- St. Matthias Episcopal Church, November 2012

- Location within North Carolina Location within the United States
- Location: Valley St., Asheville, North Carolina
- Coordinates: 35°35′30″N 82°32′54″W
- Area: less than one acre
- Built: 1894-1896
- Architectural style: Gothic
- NRHP reference No.: 79001685
- Added to NRHP: May 10, 1979

St. Matthias Episcopal Church is a parish of the Episcopal Church located at Asheville, Buncombe County, North Carolina, in the Diocese of Western North Carolina. Founded in 1865 as the Freedmen's Church, St. Matthias believes itself to be the oldest African-American congregation in the city.

Its historic church, a one-story, cruciform plan brick building with Gothic Revival design influences, was built in 1894–1896. It was listed on the National Register of Historic Places in 1979.

== History ==
=== Founding ===
Immediately following the American Civil War, St. Matthias was founded as the "Freedmen's Church," a separate congregation of recently emancipated enslaved people at Trinity Episcopal Church with the understanding that as soon as possible, it would be housed in a building of its own. Because the church was founded so close to the end of the Civil War, it considered to be one of the oldest, if not the oldest, African American Church in Asheville. According to the account of Thomas W. Patton, one of the founders of the church, the work of the Freedman's Church "started in Trinity Church, where each Sunday afternoon a crowd of Colored people were collected and drilled in the Catechism and other teachings of our church." He continued stating that, "It is well remembered by some... how heartily the learners sang chants, hymns, responses, and repeated the Catechism Sunday after Sunday, much to the amusement, and perchance ridicule of some who thought themselves wise. The result has proven who were truly wise of those distant days." The Freedmen's Church began meeting in a small structure near Trinity Episcopal Church that became known as Trinity Chapel.

=== Construction ===
As early as 1879 members of the Freedmen's congregation saw a need for a new building. It was several years later when construction on St. Matthias finally began. Although the architect of the church is unknown, the contractor for the project was James Vester Miller. Miller, himself born into slavery, was a member of Trinity Chapel and one of the most well respected brick masons and contractors in Asheville of his time. Miller is also responsible for the construction of Mt. Zion Missionary Baptist Church in Asheville, the Asheville Municipal Building, and many other projects across the state.

Congregants gathered to lay the cornerstone of the building on February 22, 1894, two days before the Feast of St. Matthias. It was at this occasion that the present Bishop, Joseph B. Cheshire, bestowed the congregation with the name "St. Matthias" in honor of its new, independent status.
