= St Matthias School =

Coordinates: 52°35′6″N 2°5′14″W

Location
- Deans Road; Deansfield; Wolverhampton, West Midlands, WV1 2BH; England

Information
- Type: Community school
- Established: 1968
- Local authority: Wolverhampton City Council
- Department for Education URN: 104387 Tables
- Ofsted: Reports
- Head teacher: D Coombes
- Gender: Mixed
- Age: 11 to 16
- Enrolment: 460 as of April 2016
- Website: http://www.st-matthias.com/

St Matthias School is a mixed secondary school located in Wolverhampton in the West Midlands of England.

It was established as Deansfield High School in 1968, and serves the Deansfield area in the east of the city, around the Willenhall Road. It was later renamed Deansfield Community School.

Deansfield Community School relocated to new buildings in 2015 and was renamed St Matthias School.
