= Listed buildings in Canterbury =

Listed buildings in Canterbury is split into:

- Listed buildings in Canterbury (within city walls, east)
- Listed buildings in Canterbury (within city walls, west)
- Listed buildings in Canterbury (within city walls, north)
- Listed buildings in Canterbury (outside city walls, north)
- Listed buildings in Canterbury (outside city walls, south)
- Listed buildings in Canterbury (Herne Bay and Whitstable)
