= Listed buildings in Canterbury (within city walls, north) =

Civil Parish in Kent, England

Canterbury is a city in Kent, England. The non-civil parish contains 1068 listed buildings that are recorded in the National Heritage List for England for Canterbury, Herne Bay and Whitstable. Of these 35 are grade I, 50 are grade II* and 983 are grade II.

This list covers the area within the city walls of Canterbury north of the river Great Stour. It is based on the information retrieved online from Historic England.

Further lists of listed buildings in Canterbury can be found here:

- City of Canterbury within the city walls, eastern part
- City of Canterbury within the city walls, western part
- City of Canterbury outside the city wall, north of the river Great Stour
- City of Canterbury outside the city wall, south of the river Great Stour
- Herne Bay and Whitstable

== Key ==
Grade	Criteria
I	Buildings that are of exceptional interest
II*	Particularly important buildings of more than special interest
II	Buildings that are of special interest

== Listed buildings within the city walls ==
=== All Saint's Lane ===
Name	Grade	Location	Type	Completed (Note: The date given is the date used by Historic England as significant for the initial building or that of an important part in the structure's description.)	Date designated	Grid ref. (Note: The grid reference is based on the British national grid reference system, sometimes known as OSGB36, used by the Ordnance Survey.) Geo-coordinates	Notes	Entry number (Note: The "List Entry Number" is a unique number assigned to each listed building and scheduled monument by Historic England.)	Image	Wikidata
All Saints Cottage All Saints Court	II	All Saint's Lane			3 December 1949	TR1479757978; 51°16′50″N 1°04′43″E		1277836	Upload Photo	Q26567220
Barn (Opposite All Saints Court)	II	All Saint's Lane			7 September 1973	TR1478557978; 51°16′50″N 1°04′42″E		1085163	Upload Photo	Q26371073
Building Adjoining All Saints Court to the South West	II	All Saint's Lane			7 September 1973	TR1478957969; 51°16′49″N 1°04′42″E		1085162	Upload Photo	Q26371067

=== Pound Lane ===
Name	Grade	Location	Type	Completed	Date designated	Grid ref. Geo-coordinates	Notes	Entry number	Image	Wikidata
Kent Music School	II	1, Pound Lane			17 October 1980	TR1462058107; 51°16′54″N 1°04′34″E		1273535	Kent Music School More images	Q26563270
6, Pound Lane	II	6, Pound Lane			3 December 1949	TR1469858190; 51°16′57″N 1°04′38″E		1241733	6, Pound Lane More images	Q26534591
Wool Stores South of No 6	II	Pound Lane			7 September 1973	TR1466758163; 51°16′56″N 1°04′37″E		1241655	Wool Stores South of No 6 More images	Q26534517
7-12, Pound Lane	II	7-12, Pound Lane			7 September 1973	TR1471158202; 51°16′57″N 1°04′39″E		1260403	7-12, Pound Lane More images	Q26551420
16, Pound Lane	II	16, Pound Lane			3 December 1949	TR1475558231; 51°16′58″N 1°04′41″E		1260374	16, Pound Lane More images	Q26551393
18 and 19, Pound Lane	II	18 and 19, Pound Lane			7 September 1973	TR1484358233; 51°16′58″N 1°04′46″E		1260404	18 and 19, Pound Lane More images	Q26551421

=== River Great Stour ===
Name	Grade	Location	Type	Completed	Date designated	Grid ref. Geo-coordinates	Notes	Entry number	Image	Wikidata
Abbot's Mill footbridge and sluice	II	River Stour			15 July 2014	TR1487158182; 51°16′56″N 1°04′47″E		1419121	Abbot's Mill footbridge and sluice More images	Q26676708

=== St Dunstan's Street ===
Name	Grade	Location	Type	Completed	Date designated	Grid ref. Geo-coordinates	Notes	Entry number	Image	Wikidata
The West Gate	I	St Dunstan's Street			3 December 1949	TR1459858091; 51°16′53″N 1°04′33″E		1241660	The West Gate More images	Q7988809
Tower House	II	St Dunstan's Street			3 May 1967	TR1452958017; 51°16′51″N 1°04′29″E		1241781	Tower House More images	Q26534635
Urn in Grounds of Tower House	II	St Dunstan's Street			7 September 1973	TR1451458004; 51°16′51″N 1°04′28″E		1241785	Upload Photo	Q26534639
Arch in Grounds of Tower House to North East of the House	II	St Dunstan's Street			3 May 1967	TR1454258045; 51°16′52″N 1°04′30″E		1241662	Arch in Grounds of Tower House to North East of the House More images	Q26534522
Arch in Grounds of Tower House to the North West of the House	II	St Dunstan's Street			3 May 1967	TR1450058022; 51°16′51″N 1°04′28″E		1241783	Arch in Grounds of Tower House to the North West of the House More images	Q26534637
Pier of Bridge in Grounds of Tower House Situated Behind Arch	II	St Dunstan's Street			7 September 1973	TR1454258048; 51°16′52″N 1°04′30″E		1260350	Upload Photo	Q26551372

=== St Peter's Lane ===
Name	Grade	Location	Type	Completed	Date designated	Grid ref. Geo-coordinates	Notes	Entry number	Image	Wikidata
Blackfriars Monastery Guest House	I	St Peter's Lane			3 December 1949	TR1484058082; 51°16′53″N 1°04′45″E		1242335	Blackfriars Monastery Guest House More images	Q17529576
St Peter's House	II	St Peter's Lane			3 December 1949	TR1474158055; 51°16′52″N 1°04′40″E		1260068	Upload Photo	Q26551130
Wall and Gatepiers to No 2	II	St Peter's Lane			7 September 1973	TR1472758047; 51°16′52″N 1°04′39″E		1242177	Upload Photo	Q26534991
1 and 3, St Peter's Lane	II	1 and 3, St Peter's Lane			7 September 1973	TR1471558042; 51°16′52″N 1°04′39″E		1242176	Upload Photo	Q26534990
The Red House	II	4, St Peter's Lane			3 December 1949	TR1474458063; 51°16′52″N 1°04′40″E		1260072	Upload Photo	Q26551134
The White House	II	6, St Peter's Lane			3 May 1967	TR1475258068; 51°16′53″N 1°04′41″E		1242178	Upload Photo	Q26534992

=== St Peter's Place ===
Name	Grade	Location	Type	Completed	Date designated	Grid ref. Geo-coordinates	Notes	Entry number	Image	Wikidata
1-25, St Peter's Place	II	1-25, St Peter's Place			7 September 1973	TR1454257970; 51°16′50″N 1°04′30″E		1242336	Upload Photo	Q26535140
32-68, St Peter's Place	II	32-68, St Peter's Place			7 September 1973	TR1449757872; 51°16′47″N 1°04′27″E		1242337	Upload Photo	Q26535141

=== St Peter's Street ===
Name	Grade	Location	Type	Completed	Date designated	Grid ref. Geo-coordinates	Notes	Entry number	Image	Wikidata
Church of St Peter	I	St Peter's Street			3 December 1949	TR1473658015; 51°16′51″N 1°04′40″E		1242343	Church of St Peter More images	Q17529580
Church of the Holy Cross	II*	St Peter's Street			3 December 1949	TR1459258063; 51°16′53″N 1°04′32″E		1241661	Church of the Holy Cross More images	Q17557150
Forecourt to Methodist Church	II	St Peter's Street			7 September 1973	TR1471057956; 51°16′49″N 1°04′38″E		1116598	Upload Photo	Q26410193
Methodist Church	II	St Peter's Street			3 December 1949	TR1469957940; 51°16′48″N 1°04′38″E		1319845	Methodist Church More images	Q26605905
The Weavers	II*	1-3, St Peter's Street			3 December 1949	TR1478457943; 51°16′48″N 1°04′42″E		1242339	The Weavers More images	Q17557168
Ducking Stool in Grounds of No 1	II	1, St Peter's Street			7 September 1973	TR1480557960; 51°16′49″N 1°04′43″E		1242338	Upload Photo	Q26535142
4, St Peter's Street, 5 and 5A St Peter's Street	II	4, St Peter's Street, 5 and 5A St Peter's Street			3 May 1967	TR1477557950; 51°16′49″N 1°04′42″E		1242384	4, St Peter's Street, 5 and 5A St Peter's Street More images	Q26535180
6 and 6A, St Peter's Street	II	6 and 6A, St Peter's Street			7 September 1973	TR1476657958; 51°16′49″N 1°04′41″E		1242407	6 and 6A, St Peter's Street More images	Q26535201
7 and 7A, St Peter's Street, 8 St Peter's Street	II	7 and 7A, St Peter's Street, 8 St Peter's Street			7 September 1973	TR1475957966; 51°16′49″N 1°04′41″E		1242341	7 and 7A, St Peter's Street, 8 St Peter's Street More images	Q26535144
9 and 10, St Peter's Street	II	9 and 10, St Peter's Street			3 May 1967	TR1475057974; 51°16′49″N 1°04′40″E		1242342	9 and 10, St Peter's Street More images	Q26535145
12, St Peter's Street	II	12, St Peter's Street			7 September 1973	TR1473257992; 51°16′50″N 1°04′39″E		1260074	12, St Peter's Street More images	Q26551136
13 and 13A, St Peter's Street	II	13 and 13A, St Peter's Street			3 December 1949	TR1472557998; 51°16′50″N 1°04′39″E		1260046	13 and 13A, St Peter's Street More images	Q26551108
The Cricketers	II	14, St Peter's Street			7 September 1973	TR1471158011; 51°16′51″N 1°04′38″E		1260075	Upload Photo	Q26551137
15, St Peter's Street	II	15, St Peter's Street			7 September 1973	TR1470758016; 51°16′51″N 1°04′38″E		1242437	15, St Peter's Street More images	Q26535226
19 and 20, St Peter's Street	II	19 and 20, St Peter's Street			7 September 1973	TR1468958030; 51°16′51″N 1°04′37″E		1242344	19 and 20, St Peter's Street More images	Q26535146
21, St Peter's Street	II	21, St Peter's Street			7 September 1973	TR1468458035; 51°16′52″N 1°04′37″E		1260012	Upload Photo	Q26551076
22 and 23, St Peter's Street	II	22 and 23, St Peter's Street			3 May 1967	TR1467758040; 51°16′52″N 1°04′37″E		1242345	22 and 23, St Peter's Street More images	Q26535147
24, St Peter's Street	II	24, St Peter's Street			7 September 1973	TR1467158046; 51°16′52″N 1°04′36″E		1260018	Upload Photo	Q26551081
25, St Peter's Street	II	25, St Peter's Street			3 May 1967	TR1466858053; 51°16′52″N 1°04′36″E		1260076	Upload Photo	Q26551138
26, St Peter's Street	II	26, St Peter's Street			3 May 1967	TR1466058056; 51°16′52″N 1°04′36″E		1116657	26, St Peter's Street More images	Q26410250
27 and 27A, St Peter's Street	II	27 and 27A, St Peter's Street			3 May 1967	TR1465158062; 51°16′52″N 1°04′35″E		1116659	27 and 27A, St Peter's Street More images	Q26410252
34-36, St Peter's Street	II	34-36, St Peter's Street			7 September 1973	TR1463558045; 51°16′52″N 1°04′35″E		1116660	Upload Photo	Q26410253
37, St Peter's Street	II	37, St Peter's Street			3 May 1967	TR1464358039; 51°16′52″N 1°04′35″E		1116661	37, St Peter's Street More images	Q26410254
38, St Peter's Street	II	38, St Peter's Street			7 September 1973	TR1464958036; 51°16′52″N 1°04′35″E		1319842	38, St Peter's Street More images	Q26605902
39, St Peter's Street	II	39, St Peter's Street			7 September 1973	TR1465258028; 51°16′51″N 1°04′35″E		1116662	39, St Peter's Street More images	Q26410255
42, St Peter's Street, 41 and 41 A St Peter's Street	II	42, St Peter's Street, 41 and 41 A St Peter's Street			7 September 1973	TR1466858021; 51°16′51″N 1°04′36″E		1319843	Upload Photo	Q26605903
43 and 434A, St Peter's Street	II	43 and 434A, St Peter's Street			3 May 1967	TR1467558015; 51°16′51″N 1°04′37″E		1116663	43 and 434A, St Peter's Street More images	Q26410256
44, St Peter's Street	II	44, St Peter's Street			7 September 1973	TR1468158009; 51°16′51″N 1°04′37″E		1116664	Upload Photo	Q26410257
45, St Peter's Street	II	45, St Peter's Street			7 September 1973	TR1468858003; 51°16′51″N 1°04′37″E		1319844	Upload Photo	Q26605904
49 and 50, St Peter's Street	II	49 and 50, St Peter's Street			3 May 1967	TR1471457982; 51°16′50″N 1°04′39″E		1116665	49 and 50, St Peter's Street More images	Q26410258
51, St Peter's Street	II	51, St Peter's Street			7 September 1973	TR1471957976; 51°16′50″N 1°04′39″E		1319872	51, St Peter's Street More images	Q26605931
52, St Peter's Street	II	52, St Peter's Street			7 September 1973	TR1472757968; 51°16′49″N 1°04′39″E		1116666	Upload Photo	Q26410259
Cockyns Hospital Cogan House Cogans Hospital	II*	53 and 53A, St Peter's Street			3 May 1967	TR1473357962; 51°16′49″N 1°04′39″E		1116577	Upload Photo	Q17557098
54, St Peter's Street	II	54, St Peter's Street			7 September 1973	TR1474157955; 51°16′49″N 1°04′40″E		1116667	54, St Peter's Street More images	Q26410260
55, St Peter's Street	II	55, St Peter's Street			3 May 1967	TR1474557951; 51°16′49″N 1°04′40″E		1319847	Upload Photo	Q26605907
56 and 57, St Peter's Street	II	56 and 57, St Peter's Street			7 September 1973	TR1475157946; 51°16′49″N 1°04′40″E		1358675	56 and 57, St Peter's Street More images	Q26641052
The Master's Lodge Eastbridge Hospital	II	58, St Peter's Street			3 December 1949	TR1475557927; 51°16′48″N 1°04′41″E		1319848	The Master's Lodge Eastbridge Hospital More images	Q26605908
59 and 60, St Peter's Street	II	59 and 60, St Peter's Street			7 September 1973	TR1477457928; 51°16′48″N 1°04′42″E		1116629	59 and 60, St Peter's Street More images	Q26410224

=== Stour Street ===
Name	Grade	Location	Type	Completed	Date designated	Grid ref. Geo-coordinates	Notes	Entry number	Image	Wikidata
Greyfriars Monastery	I	Stour Street			3 December 1949	TR1468157810; 51°16′44″N 1°04′36″E		1242684	Greyfriars Monastery More images	Q5608359
Wall to North East of Greyfriars Monastery	II	Stour Street			7 September 1973	TR1469757828; 51°16′45″N 1°04′37″E		1242685	Upload Photo	Q26535444
Wall to the North West of Greyfriars Monastery	II	Stour Street			10 January 1977	TR1466357814; 51°16′44″N 1°04′36″E		1258493	Upload Photo	Q26549721

=== The Friars ===
Name	Grade	Location	Type	Completed	Date designated	Grid ref. Geo-coordinates	Notes	Entry number	Image	Wikidata
The Friars Cottage	II	11, The Friars			7 September 1973	TR1482158001; 51°16′50″N 1°04′44″E		1336821	The Friars Cottage More images	Q26621294
Former Mitre Inn	II	12, The Friars			7 September 1973	TR1480858010; 51°16′51″N 1°04′43″E		1240635	Former Mitre Inn More images	Q26533549
13, The Friars	II	13, The Friars			7 September 1973	TR1480158007; 51°16′50″N 1°04′43″E		1085059	13, The Friars More images	Q26370570
14, The Friars	II	14, The Friars			7 September 1973	TR1479858006; 51°16′50″N 1°04′43″E		1240637	14, The Friars More images	Q26533551
15, The Friars	II	15, The Friars			7 September 1973	TR1479458004; 51°16′50″N 1°04′43″E		1336841	15, The Friars More images	Q26621307
16 and 17, the Friars	II	16 and 17, the Friars			7 September 1973	TR1479257989; 51°16′50″N 1°04′43″E		1085016	16 and 17, the Friars More images	Q26370340
18, The Friars	II	18, The Friars			7 September 1973	TR1476857990; 51°16′50″N 1°04′41″E		1336842	18, The Friars More images	Q26621308

== See also ==
- Grade I listed buildings in Kent
- Grade II* listed buildings in Kent

== Sources ==
- Newman, John (2013) [1969], Kent: North-East and East, The Buildings of England, New Haven and London: Yale University Press, ISBN 978-0-300-18506-5
