= Listed buildings in Canterbury (within city walls, east) =

Civil Parish in Kent, England

Canterbury is a city in Kent, England. The non-civil parish contains 1068 listed buildings that are recorded in the National Heritage List for England for Canterbury, Herne Bay and Whitstable. Of these 35 are grade I, 50 are grade II* and 983 are grade II.

This list covers the area within the city walls of Canterbury east of and including High Street south of the river Great Stour. It is based on the information retrieved online from Historic England.

Further lists of listed buildings in Canterbury can be found here:

- City of Canterbury within the city walls, western part
- City of Canterbury within the city walls, north of the river Great Stour
- City of Canterbury outside the city wall, north of the river Great Stour
- City of Canterbury outside the city wall, south of the river Great Stour
- Herne Bay and Whitstable

== Key ==
| Grade | Criteria |
|---|---|
| I | Buildings that are of exceptional interest |
| II* | Particularly important buildings of more than special interest |
| II | Buildings that are of special interest |

== Listed buildings within the city walls ==
=== Best Lane ===
| Name | Grade | Location | Type | Completed (Note: The date given is the date used by Historic England as significant for the initial building or that of an important part in the structure's description.) | Date designated | Grid ref. (Note: The grid reference is based on the British national grid reference system, sometimes known as OSGB36, used by the Ordnance Survey.) Geo-coordinates | Notes | Entry number (Note: The "List Entry Number" is a unique number assigned to each listed building and scheduled monument by Historic England.) | Image | Wikidata |
|---|---|---|---|---|---|---|---|---|---|---|
| Two K6 Telephone Kiosks | II | Best Lane | | | 1 March 1989 | TR1482957934; 51°16′48″N 1°04′44″E | | 1273439 | Upload Photo | Q26563184 |
| 3, Best Lane | II* | 3, Best Lane | | | 3 May 1967 | TR1486557980; 51°16′50″N 1°04′46″E | | 1085167 | 3, Best Lane More images | Q17557036 |
| 4, Best Lane | II* | 4, Best Lane | | | 3 May 1967 | TR1486357976; 51°16′49″N 1°04′46″E | | 1336756 | 4, Best Lane More images | Q17557243 |
| 5, Best Lane | II | 5, Best Lane | | | 7 September 1973 | TR1486057972; 51°16′49″N 1°04′46″E | | 1277778 | 5, Best Lane More images | Q26567168 |
| Old Stained Glass Factory Factory to the Rear of Number 5, Including 5A | II | 5A, Best Lane | | | 7 September 1973 | TR1483657979; 51°16′50″N 1°04′45″E | | 1085168 | Upload Photo | Q26371099 |
| Tudor House | II* | 6, Best Lane | | | 3 May 1967 | TR1485157961; 51°16′49″N 1°04′46″E | | 1085169 | Tudor House More images | Q17557039 |
| 7 and 8, Best Lane | II | 7 and 8, Best Lane | | | 3 May 1967 | TR1484757954; 51°16′49″N 1°04′45″E | | 1248704 | 7 and 8, Best Lane More images | Q26540898 |
| 9 and 10, Best Lane | II | 9 and 10, Best Lane | | | 7 September 1973 | TR1484357947; 51°16′48″N 1°04′45″E | | 1336757 | 9 and 10, Best Lane More images | Q26621234 |
| 11, Best Lane | II | 11, Best Lane | | | 7 September 1973 | TR1483757939; 51°16′48″N 1°04′45″E | | 1248724 | Upload Photo | Q26540917 |
| Sluice Gates to King's Mill to Rear of Nos 11 and 12 | II | 11 and 12, Best Lane | | | 7 September 1973 | TR1480957953; 51°16′49″N 1°04′43″E | | 1336758 | Upload Photo | Q26621235 |
| 12, Best Lane | II | 12, Best Lane | | | 7 September 1973 | TR1483457937; 51°16′48″N 1°04′45″E | | 1085170 | 12, Best Lane More images | Q26371104 |
| 16A, Best Lane | II | 16A, Best Lane | | | 3 May 1967 | TR1486157945; 51°16′48″N 1°04′46″E | | 1336776 | Upload Photo | Q26621251 |
| 17, Best Lane | II | 17, Best Lane | | | 3 May 1967 | TR1486457951; 51°16′49″N 1°04′46″E | | 1085127 | 17, Best Lane More images | Q26370876 |
| 18, Best Lane | II | 18, Best Lane | | | 3 May 1967 | TR1486657957; 51°16′49″N 1°04′46″E | | 1336777 | 18, Best Lane More images | Q26621252 |
| 19, Best Lane | II | 19, Best Lane | | | 3 May 1967 | TR1486857960; 51°16′49″N 1°04′46″E | | 1085128 | 19, Best Lane More images | Q26370881 |
| 20, Best Lane | II | 20, Best Lane | | | 3 May 1967 | TR1487157964; 51°16′49″N 1°04′47″E | | 1085129 | 20, Best Lane More images | Q26370888 |
| 22 and 23, Best Lane | II | 22 and 23, Best Lane | | | 3 May 1967 | TR1487857977; 51°16′49″N 1°04′47″E | | 1336778 | 22 and 23, Best Lane More images | Q26621253 |

=== Blackfriars Street ===
| Name | Grade | Location | Type | Completed | Date designated | Grid ref. Geo-coordinates | Notes | Entry number | Image | Wikidata |
|---|---|---|---|---|---|---|---|---|---|---|
| The Former Blackfriars Monastery | I | Blackfriars Street | | | 3 December 1949 | TR1486258076; 51°16′53″N 1°04′46″E | | 1085131 | The Former Blackfriars Monastery More images | Q4922885 |
| Wall on Right Side of Blackfriars Monastery | II | Blackfriars Street | | | 7 September 1973 | TR1487758092; 51°16′53″N 1°04′47″E | | 1336779 | Wall on Right Side of Blackfriars Monastery More images | Q26621254 |
| 1-10, Blackfriars Street | II | 1-10, Blackfriars Street | | | 7 September 1973 | TR1488558140; 51°16′55″N 1°04′48″E | | 1085130 | 1-10, Blackfriars Street More images | Q26370894 |
| 11-18, Blackfriars Street | II | 11-18, Blackfriars Street | | | 7 September 1973 | TR1488558070; 51°16′52″N 1°04′48″E | | 1085132 | 11-18, Blackfriars Street More images | Q26370900 |
| 31-35, Blackfriars Street | II | 31-35, Blackfriars Street | | | 7 September 1973 | TR1489258111; 51°16′54″N 1°04′48″E | | 1085133 | Upload Photo | Q26370904 |
| 36-39, Blackfriars Street | II | 36-39, Blackfriars Street | | | 7 September 1973 | TR1489758129; 51°16′54″N 1°04′48″E | | 1085134 | Upload Photo | Q26370909 |
| 40, Blackfriars Street | II | 40, Blackfriars Street | | | 7 September 1973 | TR1489758143; 51°16′55″N 1°04′48″E | | 1085135 | 40, Blackfriars Street More images | Q26370917 |

=== Burgate ===
| Name | Grade | Location | Type | Completed | Date designated | Grid ref. Geo-coordinates | Notes | Entry number | Image | Wikidata |
|---|---|---|---|---|---|---|---|---|---|---|
| Christchurch Gateway | I | Burgate | | | 3 December 1949 | TR1498457860; 51°16′45″N 1°04′52″E | | 1085119 | Christchurch Gateway More images | Q17529505 |
| Remains of St Mary Magdalen's Church Tower | II | Burgate | | | 3 December 1949 | TR1511757772; 51°16′42″N 1°04′59″E | | 1085123 | Remains of St Mary Magdalen's Church Tower More images | Q17641451 |
| K6 Telephone Kiosk Adjacent to No 3 Burgate | II | 3, Burgate | | | 23 February 1989 | TR1523157743; 51°16′41″N 1°05′05″E | | 1258123 | K6 Telephone Kiosk Adjacent to No 3 Burgate More images | Q26549402 |
| 3 and 4, Burgate | II | 3 and 4, Burgate | | | 7 September 1973 | TR1522657745; 51°16′41″N 1°05′04″E | | 1085111 | 3 and 4, Burgate More images | Q26370793 |
| 11 and 12, Burgate | II | 11 and 12, Burgate | | | 3 May 1967 | TR1516057768; 51°16′42″N 1°05′01″E | | 1249811 | 11 and 12, Burgate More images | Q26541911 |
| Annexe to No 12 | II | 12, Burgate | | | 3 May 1967 | TR1515057774; 51°16′42″N 1°05′01″E | | 1085112 | Annexe to No 12 More images | Q26370800 |
| 13, Burgate | II | 13, Burgate | | | 3 May 1967 | TR1514557776; 51°16′43″N 1°05′00″E | | 1249814 | Upload Photo | Q26541914 |
| 14, 15 and 15 A, Burgate | II | 14, 15 and 15 A, Burgate | | | 3 May 1967 | TR1513357781; 51°16′43″N 1°05′00″E | | 1085113 | 14, 15 and 15 A, Burgate More images | Q26370806 |
| 16, Burgate | II | 16, Burgate | | | 7 September 1973 | TR1512357787; 51°16′43″N 1°04′59″E | | 1085114 | 16, Burgate More images | Q26370812 |
| 23, Burgate | II | 23, Burgate | | | 3 May 1967 | TR1506457818; 51°16′44″N 1°04′56″E | | 1249824 | 23, Burgate More images | Q26541924 |
| 24 and 25, Burgate | II | 24 and 25, Burgate | | | 3 May 1967 | TR1505457824; 51°16′44″N 1°04′56″E | | 1085115 | 24 and 25, Burgate More images | Q26370818 |
| 26-28, Burgate | II | 26-28, Burgate | | | 3 May 1967 | TR1504157832; 51°16′45″N 1°04′55″E | | 1262684 | 26-28, Burgate More images | Q26553544 |
| 29 and 30, Burgate | II | 29 and 30, Burgate | | | 3 May 1967 | TR1502857838; 51°16′45″N 1°04′54″E | | 1085116 | 29 and 30, Burgate More images | Q26370824 |
| 31, Burgate | II | 31, Burgate | | | 3 May 1967 | TR1502157840; 51°16′45″N 1°04′54″E | | 1085117 | 31, Burgate More images | Q26370831 |
| 32A, Burgate, 32 Burgate | II | 32A, Burgate, 32 Burgate | | | 3 May 1967 | TR1501557843; 51°16′45″N 1°04′54″E | | 1251583 | 32A, Burgate, 32 Burgate More images | Q26543530 |
| 33, Burgate | II | 33, Burgate | | | 3 May 1967 | TR1500957847; 51°16′45″N 1°04′53″E | | 1336809 | 33, Burgate More images | Q26621284 |
| 34, Burgate | II | 34, Burgate | | | 3 May 1967 | TR1500557849; 51°16′45″N 1°04′53″E | | 1251586 | 34, Burgate More images | Q26543532 |
| 35, Burgate | II | 35, Burgate | | | 3 May 1967 | TR1500157851; 51°16′45″N 1°04′53″E | | 1085118 | 35, Burgate More images | Q26370836 |
| 36, Burgate | II | 36, Burgate | | | 3 May 1967 | TR1499757853; 51°16′45″N 1°04′53″E | | 1336771 | 36, Burgate More images | Q26621248 |
| 37, Burgate | II* | 37, Burgate | | | 3 December 1949 | TR1499157856; 51°16′45″N 1°04′53″E | | 1262580 | 37, Burgate More images | Q17557222 |
| 38, Burgate | II | 38, Burgate | | | 3 May 1967 | TR1498157824; 51°16′44″N 1°04′52″E | | 1085120 | 38, Burgate More images | Q26370843 |
| 38A, Burgate | II | 38A, Burgate | | | 3 May 1967 | TR1498557822; 51°16′44″N 1°04′52″E | | 1251870 | 38A, Burgate More images | Q26543795 |
| The Olive Branch Public House | II | 39, Burgate | | | 3 May 1967 | TR1499157819; 51°16′44″N 1°04′52″E | | 1336772 | The Olive Branch Public House More images | Q26621249 |
| 40, Burgate | II* | 40, Burgate | | | 3 December 1949 | TR1499957820; 51°16′44″N 1°04′53″E | | 1251875 | 40, Burgate More images | Q17557177 |
| 41, Burgate | II* | 41, Burgate | | | 3 December 1949 | TR1500457831; 51°16′45″N 1°04′53″E | | 1085121 | 41, Burgate More images | Q17557031 |
| 42, Burgate | II* | 42, Burgate | | | 3 December 1949 | TR1500957829; 51°16′44″N 1°04′53″E | | 1336773 | 42, Burgate More images | Q17557247 |
| 43, Burgate | II* | 43, Burgate | | | 3 December 1949 | TR1501557827; 51°16′44″N 1°04′54″E | | 1251891 | 43, Burgate More images | Q17557180 |
| 44, Burgate | II | 44, Burgate | | | 3 May 1967 | TR1502057823; 51°16′44″N 1°04′54″E | | 1085122 | 44, Burgate More images | Q26370848 |
| The Presbytery | II* | 59, Burgate | | | 3 December 1949 | TR1513957759; 51°16′42″N 1°05′00″E | | 1251907 | Upload Photo | Q17557186 |
| 62, Burgate | II* | 62, Burgate | | | 3 December 1949 | TR1517157744; 51°16′41″N 1°05′02″E | | 1336774 | 62, Burgate More images | Q17557252 |
| 63 and 64, Burgate | II | 63 and 64, Burgate | | | 3 May 1967 | TR1518357742; 51°16′41″N 1°05′02″E | | 1262520 | 63 and 64, Burgate More images | Q26553389 |
| 65 and 66, Burgate | II | 65 and 66, Burgate | | | 3 May 1967 | TR1519457739; 51°16′41″N 1°05′03″E | | 1085124 | 65 and 66, Burgate More images | Q26370858 |
| 67, Burgate | II | 67, Burgate | | | 3 December 1949 | TR1520057738; 51°16′41″N 1°05′03″E | | 1336775 | Upload Photo | Q26621250 |
| 68 and 68A, Burgate | II | 68 and 68A, Burgate | | | 3 May 1967 | TR1520457737; 51°16′41″N 1°05′03″E | | 1251964 | Upload Photo | Q26543876 |
| 69, Burgate | II | 69, Burgate | | | 3 May 1967 | TR1521057734; 51°16′41″N 1°05′04″E | | 1085125 | 69, Burgate More images | Q26370864 |

=== Burgate Lane ===
| Name | Grade | Location | Type | Completed | Date designated | Grid ref. Geo-coordinates | Notes | Entry number | Image | Wikidata |
|---|---|---|---|---|---|---|---|---|---|---|
| Zoar Chapel | II | Burgate Lane | | | 7 September 1973 | TR1519157675; 51°16′39″N 1°05′02″E | | 1251968 | Zoar Chapel More images | Q26543879 |
| 1, Burgate Lane | II | 1, Burgate Lane | | | 7 September 1973 | TR1520657728; 51°16′41″N 1°05′03″E | | 1085126 | 1, Burgate Lane More images | Q26370869 |

=== Butchery Lane ===
| Name | Grade | Location | Type | Completed | Date designated | Grid ref. Geo-coordinates | Notes | Entry number | Image | Wikidata |
|---|---|---|---|---|---|---|---|---|---|---|
| 1, Butchery Lane | II | 1, Butchery Lane | | | 3 May 1967 | TR1501757817; 51°16′44″N 1°04′54″E | | 1085083 | 1, Butchery Lane More images | Q26370653 |
| 2, Butchery Lane | II | 2, Butchery Lane | | | 3 May 1967 | TR1501357810; 51°16′44″N 1°04′54″E | | 1336794 | 2, Butchery Lane More images | Q26621269 |
| 3, Butchery Lane | II | 3, Butchery Lane | | | 3 May 1967 | TR1501157807; 51°16′44″N 1°04′53″E | | 1336795 | 3, Butchery Lane More images | Q26621270 |
| 4, Butchery Lane | II | 4, Butchery Lane | | | 3 May 1967 | TR1500957803; 51°16′44″N 1°04′53″E | | 1336796 | 4, Butchery Lane More images | Q26621271 |
| Shakespeare Inn | II | 5, Butchery Lane | | | 3 May 1967 | TR1500557800; 51°16′44″N 1°04′53″E | | 1085084 | Shakespeare Inn More images | Q26370659 |
| 6, Butchery Lane | II | 6, Butchery Lane | | | 3 May 1967 | TR1500257795; 51°16′43″N 1°04′53″E | | 1085085 | 6, Butchery Lane More images | Q26370665 |
| City Arms | II | 7, Butchery Lane | | | 3 May 1967 | TR1499957791; 51°16′43″N 1°04′53″E | | 1336797 | City Arms More images | Q26621272 |
| 8 and 9, Butchery Lane | II | 8 and 9, Butchery Lane | | | 3 May 1967 | TR1499457785; 51°16′43″N 1°04′53″E | | 1085086 | 8 and 9, Butchery Lane More images | Q26370671 |

=== Buttermarket ===
| Name | Grade | Location | Type | Completed | Date designated | Grid ref. Geo-coordinates | Notes | Entry number | Image | Wikidata |
|---|---|---|---|---|---|---|---|---|---|---|
| Canterbury War Memorial | II | Buttermarket | | | 7 November 2016 | TR1498757842; 51°16′45″N 1°04′52″E | | 1437667 | Canterbury War Memorial More images | Q66477861 |

=== Church Lane ===
| Name | Grade | Location | Type | Completed | Date designated | Grid ref. Geo-coordinates | Notes | Entry number | Image | Wikidata |
|---|---|---|---|---|---|---|---|---|---|---|
| St Radigund Hall | II* | 3-9, Church Lane | | | 3 December 1949 | TR1506958206; 51°16′57″N 1°04′57″E | | 1336812 | St Radigund Hall More images | Q17557256 |

=== Guildhall Street ===
| Name | Grade | Location | Type | Completed | Date designated | Grid ref. Geo-coordinates | Notes | Entry number | Image | Wikidata |
|---|---|---|---|---|---|---|---|---|---|---|
| 1 and 1A, Guildhall Street, 2 Guildhall Street | II | 1 and 1A, Guildhall Street, 2 Guildhall Street | | | 7 September 1973 | TR1493257929; 51°16′48″N 1°04′50″E | | 1240639 | Upload Photo | Q26533554 |
| 3-9, Guildhall Street | II | 3-9, Guildhall Street | | | 7 September 1973 | TR1491157897; 51°16′47″N 1°04′49″E | | 1085018 | Upload Photo | Q26370352 |
| 10, Guildhall Street | II | 10, Guildhall Street | | | 7 September 1973 | TR1489757875; 51°16′46″N 1°04′48″E | | 1336843 | Upload Photo | Q26621309 |
| 15 and 16, Guildhall Street | II | 15 and 16, Guildhall Street | | | 7 September 1973 | TR1493157900; 51°16′47″N 1°04′50″E | | 1260928 | Upload Photo | Q26551911 |
| 17 and 18, Guildhall Street | II | 17 and 18, Guildhall Street | | | 7 September 1973 | TR1493957917; 51°16′47″N 1°04′50″E | | 1085019 | Upload Photo | Q26370358 |

=== High Street ===
| Name | Grade | Location | Type | Completed | Date designated | Grid ref. Geo-coordinates | Notes | Entry number | Image | Wikidata |
|---|---|---|---|---|---|---|---|---|---|---|
| Royal East Kent Yeomanry War Memorial and Associated Horse Trough | II | High Street | | | 15 June 2006 | TR1491057801; 51°16′44″N 1°04′48″E | | 1391680 | Royal East Kent Yeomanry War Memorial and Associated Horse Trough More images | Q26671033 |
| Cottages Situated to South West of Main Eastbridge Hospital Building | II | High Street | | | 7 September 1973 | TR1477357900; 51°16′47″N 1°04′41″E | | 1260864 | Upload Photo | Q26551852 |
| King's Bridge | II* | High Street | | | 7 September 1973 | TR1478657930; 51°16′48″N 1°04′42″E | | 1085029 | King's Bridge More images | Q17557004 |
| Public Library and Museum at Beaney Institute | II | High Street | | | 7 September 1973 | TR1484957895; 51°16′47″N 1°04′45″E | | 1085027 | Upload Photo | Q26370404 |
| 1 and 2, High Street | II* | 1 and 2, High Street | | | 3 May 1967 | TR1494057805; 51°16′44″N 1°04′50″E | | 1240669 | 1 and 2, High Street More images | Q17557103 |
| 8, High Street | II | 8, High Street | | | 28 March 1978 | TR1490857835; 51°16′45″N 1°04′48″E | | 1258219 | Upload Photo | Q26549480 |
| The Guildhall | II | 11, High Street | | | 3 December 1949 | TR1488857862; 51°16′46″N 1°04′47″E | | 1085024 | The Guildhall More images | Q17641331 |
| 12 and 13, High Street | II | 12 and 13, High Street | | | 3 May 1967 | TR1487757862; 51°16′46″N 1°04′47″E | | 1085025 | Upload Photo | Q26370394 |
| 14, High Street | II | 14, High Street | | | 7 September 1973 | TR1487157867; 51°16′46″N 1°04′46″E | | 1240679 | Upload Photo | Q26533592 |
| Bell Hotel | II | 15, High Street | | | 7 September 1973 | TR1486557872; 51°16′46″N 1°04′46″E | | 1085026 | Upload Photo | Q26370398 |
| 20 and 20A, High Street | II | 20 and 20A, High Street | | | 7 September 1973 | TR1483757901; 51°16′47″N 1°04′45″E | | 1260878 | Upload Photo | Q26551864 |
| 21, High Street | II | 21, High Street | | | 7 September 1973 | TR1483157907; 51°16′47″N 1°04′44″E | | 1085028 | 21, High Street More images | Q26370408 |
| 24, High Street | II | 24, High Street | | | 7 September 1973 | TR1480257933; 51°16′48″N 1°04′43″E | | 1260886 | Upload Photo | Q26551871 |
| Eastbridge Hospital | I | 25, 26, High Street | | | 7 September 1973 | TR1478557921; 51°16′48″N 1°04′42″E | | 1085030 | Eastbridge Hospital More images | Q5329834 |
| 27, High Street | II | 27, High Street | | | 7 September 1973 | TR1479657907; 51°16′47″N 1°04′43″E | | 1085031 | Upload Photo | Q26370414 |
| Post Office | II | 28, High Street | | | 7 September 1973 | TR1480157899; 51°16′47″N 1°04′43″E | | 1085032 | Post Office More images | Q26370419 |
| 29, High Street | II | 29, High Street | | | 7 September 1973 | TR1480857890; 51°16′47″N 1°04′43″E | | 1240744 | 29, High Street More images | Q26533649 |
| County Hotel | II | 30 and 31, High Street | | | 31 January 1977 | TR1481957877; 51°16′46″N 1°04′44″E | | 1258464 | Upload Photo | Q26549696 |
| 35, High Street | II | 35, High Street | | | 7 September 1973 | TR1484957854; 51°16′45″N 1°04′45″E | | 1336847 | Upload Photo | Q26621312 |
| 36, High Street | II | 36, High Street | | | 3 May 1967 | TR1485657848; 51°16′45″N 1°04′46″E | | 1260869 | Upload Photo | Q26551857 |
| 37, High Street | II | 37, High Street | | | 3 May 1967 | TR1485957844; 51°16′45″N 1°04′46″E | | 1240754 | Upload Photo | Q26533657 |
| 38, High Street | II | 38, High Street | | | 7 September 1973 | TR1486457840; 51°16′45″N 1°04′46″E | | 1260870 | Upload Photo | Q26551858 |
| 39, High Street | II | 39, High Street | | | 7 September 1973 | TR1486857838; 51°16′45″N 1°04′46″E | | 1240756 | Upload Photo | Q26533659 |
| 41 and 41B, High Street | II | 41 and 41B, High Street | | | 5 November 1990 | TR1487857829; 51°16′45″N 1°04′47″E | | 1273510 | Upload Photo | Q26563249 |
| 42, High Street | II | 42, High Street | | | 7 September 1973 | TR1488257826; 51°16′45″N 1°04′47″E | | 1240757 | Upload Photo | Q26533660 |
| 43, High Street | II | 43, High Street | | | 7 September 1973 | TR1488657823; 51°16′44″N 1°04′47″E | | 1240758 | 43, High Street More images | Q26533661 |
| Building to Rear of No 44 | II | 44, High Street | | | 7 September 1973 | TR1488657810; 51°16′44″N 1°04′47″E | | 1240760 | Upload Photo | Q26533663 |
| Queen Elizabeth's Guest Chamber | II* | 44 and 45, High Street | | | 3 December 1949 | TR1489357817; 51°16′44″N 1°04′47″E | | 1260873 | Queen Elizabeth's Guest Chamber More images | Q17557218 |
| 46, High Street | II | 46, High Street | | | 3 May 1967 | TR1490157813; 51°16′44″N 1°04′48″E | | 1260874 | Upload Photo | Q26551861 |
| 48, High Street | II | 48, High Street | | | 7 September 1973 | TR1491957794; 51°16′43″N 1°04′49″E | | 1240820 | Upload Photo | Q26533719 |
| Lloyd's Bank | II | 49, High Street | | | 7 September 1973 | TR1492557788; 51°16′43″N 1°04′49″E | | 1260826 | Lloyd's Bank More images | Q26551819 |

=== King Street ===
| Name | Grade | Location | Type | Completed | Date designated | Grid ref. Geo-coordinates | Notes | Entry number | Image | Wikidata |
|---|---|---|---|---|---|---|---|---|---|---|
| Railings and Post in Front of St Alphege Church Hall | II | King Street | | | 7 September 1973 | TR1496858128; 51°16′54″N 1°04′52″E | | 1260794 | Upload Photo | Q26551787 |
| St Alphege Church Hall | II | King Street | | | 7 September 1973 | TR1494058146; 51°16′55″N 1°04′51″E | | 1240866 | Upload Photo | Q7085180 |
| Wall on Right Side of Railings of St Alphege Church Hall | II | King Street | | | 7 September 1973 | TR1495158143; 51°16′55″N 1°04′51″E | | 1240911 | Upload Photo | Q26533807 |
| 1, King Street | II | 1, King Street | | | 7 September 1973 | TR1487958006; 51°16′50″N 1°04′47″E | | 1240861 | 1, King Street More images | Q26533759 |
| 2, King Street | II | 2, King Street | | | 7 September 1973 | TR1488358013; 51°16′51″N 1°04′47″E | | 1260807 | 2, King Street More images | Q26551800 |
| 7, King Street | II | 7, King Street | | | 7 September 1973 | TR1489658032; 51°16′51″N 1°04′48″E | | 1240862 | 7, King Street More images | Q26533760 |
| Monastery Cottage | II | 8, King Street | | | 3 May 1967 | TR1490058035; 51°16′51″N 1°04′48″E | | 1260808 | Monastery Cottage More images | Q26551801 |
| 16-19, King Street | II | 16-19, King Street | | | 7 September 1973 | TR1494958101; 51°16′53″N 1°04′51″E | | 1240864 | 16-19, King Street More images | Q26533762 |
| 20, King Street | II | 20, King Street | | | 3 May 1967 | TR1496158126; 51°16′54″N 1°04′52″E | | 1240865 | 20, King Street More images | Q26533763 |
| Red Brick Garden Wall to No 20 | II | 20, King Street | | | 7 September 1973 | TR1494658136; 51°16′54″N 1°04′51″E | | 1260810 | Upload Photo | Q26551803 |
| 21, King Street | II | 21, King Street | | | 7 September 1973 | TR1496758138; 51°16′54″N 1°04′52″E | | 1260795 | 21, King Street More images | Q26551788 |
| Black Princes Chantry | II | 22, King Street | | | 14 January 1974 | TR1498358143; 51°16′55″N 1°04′53″E | | 1259747 | Black Princes Chantry More images | Q26550840 |
| 31-33, King Street | II | 31-33, King Street | | | 7 September 1973 | TR1499658127; 51°16′54″N 1°04′53″E | | 1240912 | 31-33, King Street More images | Q26533808 |
| Highbury Cottages | II | 34-42, King Street | | | 7 September 1973 | TR1496858109; 51°16′54″N 1°04′52″E | | 1260796 | Highbury Cottages More images | Q26551789 |
| 43, King Street | II | 43, King Street | | | 7 September 1973 | TR1496058091; 51°16′53″N 1°04′51″E | | 1240915 | 43, King Street More images | Q26533811 |
| The Prince of Wales Inn | II | 51, King Street | | | 3 May 1967 | TR1493858054; 51°16′52″N 1°04′50″E | | 1240916 | Upload Photo | Q26533812 |

=== Mercery Lane ===
| Name | Grade | Location | Type | Completed | Date designated | Grid ref. Geo-coordinates | Notes | Entry number | Image | Wikidata |
|---|---|---|---|---|---|---|---|---|---|---|
| 8A, Mercery Lane, 1-8 Mercery Lane | II* | 8A, Mercery Lane, 1-8 Mercery Lane | | | 3 December 1949 | TR1495757830; 51°16′45″N 1°04′51″E | | 1097028 | 8A, Mercery Lane, 1-8 Mercery Lane More images | Q17557085 |
| 10, Mercery Lane | II | 10, Mercery Lane | | | 3 May 1967 | TR1495457803; 51°16′44″N 1°04′51″E | | 1096951 | 10, Mercery Lane More images | Q26389208 |
| 11, Mercery Lane | II | 11, Mercery Lane | | | 3 May 1967 | TR1495757808; 51°16′44″N 1°04′51″E | | 1334344 | 11, Mercery Lane More images | Q26619017 |
| 12 and 13, Mercery Lane | II | 12 and 13, Mercery Lane | | | 3 May 1967 | TR1496257816; 51°16′44″N 1°04′51″E | | 1096952 | 12 and 13, Mercery Lane More images | Q26389209 |
| 14, Mercery Lane | II | 14, Mercery Lane | | | 3 May 1967 | TR1496757822; 51°16′44″N 1°04′51″E | | 1096953 | 14, Mercery Lane More images | Q26389210 |
| 15, Mercery Lane | II | 15, Mercery Lane | | | 3 May 1967 | TR1497057828; 51°16′44″N 1°04′51″E | | 1334345 | 15, Mercery Lane More images | Q26619018 |
| 16, Mercery Lane | II | 16, Mercery Lane | | | 3 May 1967 | TR1497557832; 51°16′45″N 1°04′52″E | | 1096954 | 16, Mercery Lane More images | Q26389211 |

=== Mill Lane ===
| Name | Grade | Location | Type | Completed | Date designated | Grid ref. Geo-coordinates | Notes | Entry number | Image | Wikidata |
|---|---|---|---|---|---|---|---|---|---|---|
| 2 and 3, Mill Lane | II | 2 and 3, Mill Lane | | | 7 September 1973 | TR1491358187; 51°16′56″N 1°04′49″E | | 1334331 | 2 and 3, Mill Lane More images | Q26619005 |
| 4 and 5, Mill Lane | II | 4 and 5, Mill Lane | | | 3 May 1967 | TR1490858177; 51°16′56″N 1°04′49″E | | 1096930 | 4 and 5, Mill Lane More images | Q26389192 |
| 6, Mill Lane | II | 6, Mill Lane | | | 7 September 1973 | TR1490558167; 51°16′56″N 1°04′49″E | | 1334332 | 6, Mill Lane More images | Q26619006 |
| 7, Mill Lane | II | 7, Mill Lane | | | 7 September 1973 | TR1490558154; 51°16′55″N 1°04′49″E | | 1096931 | 7, Mill Lane More images | Q26389193 |
| 8-12, Mill Lane | II | 8-12, Mill Lane | | | 7 September 1973 | TR1491358145; 51°16′55″N 1°04′49″E | | 1334333 | 8-12, Mill Lane More images | Q26619007 |

=== Northgate ===
| Name | Grade | Location | Type | Completed | Date designated | Grid ref. Geo-coordinates | Notes | Entry number | Image | Wikidata |
|---|---|---|---|---|---|---|---|---|---|---|
| St Mary Northgate Hall | II | Northgate | | | 3 December 1949 | TR1510258184; 51°16′56″N 1°04′59″E | | 1241110 | St Mary Northgate Hall More images | Q26533999 |

=== Orange Street ===
| Name | Grade | Location | Type | Completed | Date designated | Grid ref. Geo-coordinates | Notes | Entry number | Image | Wikidata |
|---|---|---|---|---|---|---|---|---|---|---|
| Seven Stars Hotel | II | 1, Orange Street | | | 7 September 1973 | TR1492657940; 51°16′48″N 1°04′49″E | | 1260531 | Seven Stars Hotel More images | Q26551537 |
| 4, Orange Street | II | 4, Orange Street | | | 7 September 1973 | TR1490257960; 51°16′49″N 1°04′48″E | | 1241373 | 4, Orange Street More images | Q26534254 |
| 5 and 6, Orange Street | II | 5 and 6, Orange Street | | | 7 September 1973 | TR1489357969; 51°16′49″N 1°04′48″E | | 1241374 | Upload Photo | Q26534255 |
| 7, Orange Street | II | 7, Orange Street | | | 3 May 1967 | TR1488557979; 51°16′49″N 1°04′47″E | | 1241375 | 7, Orange Street More images | Q26534256 |
| 9, Orange Street | II | 9, Orange Street | | | 7 September 1973 | TR1489257993; 51°16′50″N 1°04′48″E | | 1241376 | Upload Photo | Q26534257 |
| 10, Orange Street | II | 10, Orange Street | | | 7 September 1973 | TR1489557990; 51°16′50″N 1°04′48″E | | 1241377 | Upload Photo | Q26534258 |
| 13 and 14, Orange Street | II | 13 and 14, Orange Street | | | 7 September 1973 | TR1490057985; 51°16′50″N 1°04′48″E | | 1241378 | 13 and 14, Orange Street More images | Q26534259 |
| Oddfellows Hall | II | 15, Orange Street | | | 7 September 1973 | TR1491157982; 51°16′50″N 1°04′49″E | | 1241379 | Oddfellows Hall More images | Q26534260 |
| 16, Orange Street | II | 16, Orange Street | | | 3 May 1967 | TR1491957970; 51°16′49″N 1°04′49″E | | 1241380 | 16, Orange Street More images | Q26534261 |
| 17, Orange Street | II | 17, Orange Street | | | 7 September 1973 | TR1492557964; 51°16′49″N 1°04′49″E | | 1260533 | Upload Photo | Q26551539 |
| 19 and 19A, Orange Street | II | 19 and 19A, Orange Street | | | 7 September 1973 | TR1493057956; 51°16′49″N 1°04′50″E | | 1241381 | Upload Photo | Q26534262 |
| 20, Orange Street | II | 20, Orange Street | | | 7 September 1973 | TR1493557951; 51°16′48″N 1°04′50″E | | 1241382 | Upload Photo | Q26534263 |

=== Palace Street ===
| Name | Grade | Location | Type | Completed | Date designated | Grid ref. Geo-coordinates | Notes | Entry number | Image | Wikidata |
|---|---|---|---|---|---|---|---|---|---|---|
| Church of St Alphege With St Margaret | II* | Palace Street | | | 3 December 1949 | TR1496458018; 51°16′51″N 1°04′52″E | | 1241460 | Church of St Alphege With St Margaret More images | Q17557134 |
| K6 Telephone Kiosk Adjacent to Precincts of Christ Church Cathedral | II | Palace Street | | | 25 November 1987 | TR1506358111; 51°16′53″N 1°04′57″E | | 1258125 | K6 Telephone Kiosk Adjacent to Precincts of Christ Church Cathedral More images | Q26549404 |
| Old Huguenot Weaver's House | II* | Palace Street | | | 3 December 1949 | TR1501358102; 51°16′53″N 1°04′54″E | | 1241442 | Old Huguenot Weaver's House More images | Q17557118 |
| 1, Palace Street | II | 1, Palace Street | | | 7 September 1973 | TR1494357950; 51°16′48″N 1°04′50″E | | 1241431 | 1, Palace Street More images | Q26534313 |
| 2, Palace Street | II | 2, Palace Street | | | 7 September 1973 | TR1494557959; 51°16′49″N 1°04′50″E | | 1260521 | Upload Photo | Q26551527 |
| 4 and 5, Palace Street | II | 4 and 5, Palace Street | | | 7 September 1973 | TR1495057971; 51°16′49″N 1°04′51″E | | 1241432 | 4 and 5, Palace Street More images | Q26534314 |
| 6, Palace Street | II | 6, Palace Street | | | 7 September 1973 | TR1495257979; 51°16′49″N 1°04′51″E | | 1255546 | 6, Palace Street More images | Q26547127 |
| 7, Palace Street | II | 7, Palace Street | | | 7 September 1973 | TR1495857986; 51°16′50″N 1°04′51″E | | 1255547 | 7, Palace Street More images | Q26547128 |
| 8, Palace Street | II* | 8, Palace Street | | | 3 December 1949 | TR1496157993; 51°16′50″N 1°04′51″E | | 1241459 | 8, Palace Street More images | Q17557131 |
| The Bell and Crown Inn | II | 11, Palace Street | | | 3 May 1967 | TR1497858034; 51°16′51″N 1°04′52″E | | 1260522 | The Bell and Crown Inn More images | Q26551528 |
| 12, Palace Street | II | 12, Palace Street | | | 3 May 1967 | TR1498158040; 51°16′51″N 1°04′52″E | | 1241433 | 12, Palace Street More images | Q26534315 |
| 13, Palace Street | II | 13, Palace Street | | | 3 May 1967 | TR1498358045; 51°16′51″N 1°04′53″E | | 1241479 | Upload Photo | Q26534356 |
| 14 and 15, Palace Street | II | 14 and 15, Palace Street | | | 7 September 1973 | TR1498758052; 51°16′52″N 1°04′53″E | | 1241434 | 14 and 15, Palace Street More images | Q26534316 |
| 16, Palace Street | II | 16, Palace Street | | | 7 September 1973 | TR1498958058; 51°16′52″N 1°04′53″E | | 1260508 | Upload Photo | Q26551514 |
| Conquest House | II* | 17, Palace Street | | | 3 December 1949 | TR1499258064; 51°16′52″N 1°04′53″E | | 1241437 | Conquest House More images | Q17557113 |
| 18, Palace Street | II | 18, Palace Street | | | 7 September 1973 | TR1499458070; 51°16′52″N 1°04′53″E | | 1241438 | 18, Palace Street More images | Q26534319 |
| 19, Palace Street | II | 19, Palace Street | | | 7 September 1973 | TR1499658073; 51°16′52″N 1°04′53″E | | 1241439 | 19, Palace Street More images | Q26534320 |
| 20, Palace Street | II | 20, Palace Street | | | 7 September 1973 | TR1500058081; 51°16′53″N 1°04′54″E | | 1241440 | 20, Palace Street More images | Q26534321 |
| 21, Palace Street | II | 21, Palace Street | | | 3 May 1967 | TR1500658089; 51°16′53″N 1°04′54″E | | 1241441 | 21, Palace Street More images | Q26534322 |
| 22, Palace Street | II | 22, Palace Street | | | 3 May 1967 | TR1501158097; 51°16′53″N 1°04′54″E | | 1260475 | 22, Palace Street More images | Q26551483 |
| 24 and 25, Palace Street | II | 24 and 25, Palace Street | | | 3 May 1967 | TR1501658108; 51°16′53″N 1°04′54″E | | 1241502 | 24 and 25, Palace Street More images | Q26534378 |
| 26 and 27, Palace Street | II | 26 and 27, Palace Street | | | 3 May 1967 | TR1502058115; 51°16′54″N 1°04′55″E | | 1260479 | 26 and 27, Palace Street More images | Q26551486 |
| The King's School Shop | II* | 28, Palace Street | | | 3 December 1949 | TR1502358122; 51°16′54″N 1°04′55″E | | 1241614 | The King's School Shop More images | Q17557141 |
| 31-40, Palace Street, 29 and 30 Palace Street | II | 31-40, Palace Street, 29 and 30 Palace Street | | | 3 May 1967 | TR1503058097; 51°16′53″N 1°04′55″E | | 1241503 | 31-40, Palace Street, 29 and 30 Palace Street More images | Q26534379 |
| 41-45, Palace Street | II* | 41-45, Palace Street | | | 3 May 1967 | TR1501058058; 51°16′52″N 1°04′54″E | | 1241616 | 41-45, Palace Street More images | Q17557144 |
| 46, Palace Street | II | 46, Palace Street | | | 3 May 1967 | TR1499958035; 51°16′51″N 1°04′53″E | | 1241504 | 46, Palace Street More images | Q26534380 |
| 47, Palace Street | II | 47, Palace Street | | | 3 May 1967 | TR1499658024; 51°16′51″N 1°04′53″E | | 1260480 | 47, Palace Street More images | Q26551487 |
| Walpole House, King's School | II* | 48, Palace Street | | | 3 December 1949 | TR1500658007; 51°16′50″N 1°04′54″E | | 1241505 | Upload Photo | Q17557137 |
| War memorial cross at The King's School | II | Palace Street, Memorial Court | | | 16 May 2017 | TR1513058088; 51°16′53″N 1°05′00″E | | 1445869 | War memorial cross at The King's School More images | Q66478741 |
| 50 and 51, Palace Street | II | 50 and 51, Palace Street | | | 7 September 1973 | TR1496857975; 51°16′49″N 1°04′52″E | | 1260481 | Upload Photo | Q26551488 |
| 52 to 54, PALACE STREET | II | 52 to 54, PALACE STREET | | | 7 September 1973 | TR1496657967; 51°16′49″N 1°04′52″E | | 1241623 | 52 to 54, PALACE STREET More images | Q26534490 |
| 55 and 56, Palace Street | II | 55 and 56, Palace Street | | | 7 September 1973 | TR1496157958; 51°16′49″N 1°04′51″E | | 1241506 | 55 and 56, Palace Street More images | Q26534381 |
| 57, Palace Street | II | 57, Palace Street | | | 7 September 1973 | TR1496257952; 51°16′48″N 1°04′51″E | | 1241625 | 57, Palace Street More images | Q26534492 |
| 58, Palace Street | II | 58, Palace Street | | | 3 May 1967 | TR1496157946; 51°16′48″N 1°04′51″E | | 1241507 | 58, Palace Street More images | Q26534382 |
| 59, Palace Street | II | 59, Palace Street | | | 7 September 1973 | TR1496157941; 51°16′48″N 1°04′51″E | | 1241629 | 59, Palace Street More images | Q26534496 |
| 60 and 61, Palace Street | II | 60 and 61, Palace Street | | | 7 September 1973 | TR1496257930; 51°16′48″N 1°04′51″E | | 1260482 | Upload Photo | Q26551489 |

=== St Alphege Lane ===
| Name | Grade | Location | Type | Completed | Date designated | Grid ref. Geo-coordinates | Notes | Entry number | Image | Wikidata |
|---|---|---|---|---|---|---|---|---|---|---|
| 2, St Alphege Lane | II | 2, St Alphege Lane | | | 7 September 1973 | TR1494258045; 51°16′52″N 1°04′50″E | | 1241657 | 2, St Alphege Lane More images | Q26534519 |
| 3, St Alphege Lane | II | 3, St Alphege Lane | | | 7 September 1973 | TR1495058042; 51°16′51″N 1°04′51″E | | 1260375 | 3, St Alphege Lane More images | Q26551394 |
| 4, St Alphege Lane | II | 4, St Alphege Lane | | | 3 May 1967 | TR1495858038; 51°16′51″N 1°04′51″E | | 1241658 | 4, St Alphege Lane More images | Q26534520 |
| 5, St Alphege Lane | II | 5, St Alphege Lane | | | 3 May 1967 | TR1496358036; 51°16′51″N 1°04′51″E | | 1241750 | 5, St Alphege Lane More images | Q26534607 |
| 6, St Alphege Lane | II | 6, St Alphege Lane | | | 3 May 1967 | TR1496958034; 51°16′51″N 1°04′52″E | | 1241659 | 6, St Alphege Lane More images | Q26534521 |
| 7, St Alphege Lane | II | 7, St Alphege Lane | | | 3 May 1967 | TR1493358034; 51°16′51″N 1°04′50″E | | 1241756 | 7, St Alphege Lane More images | Q26534612 |
| 8, St Alphege Lane, 52 King Street | II | 8, St Alphege Lane, 52 King Street | | | 3 May 1967 | TR1492658040; 51°16′51″N 1°04′50″E | | 1240917 | 8, St Alphege Lane, 52 King Street More images | Q26533813 |

=== St George's Street ===
| Name | Grade | Location | Type | Completed | Date designated | Grid ref. Geo-coordinates | Notes | Entry number | Image | Wikidata |
|---|---|---|---|---|---|---|---|---|---|---|
| Remains of Roman Town House | I | St George's Street | | | 7 September 1973 | TR1501157783; 51°16′43″N 1°04′53″E | | 1260298 | Upload Photo | Q17529600 |
| Remains of the Church of St George the Martyr Tower | II | St George's Street | | | 3 December 1949 | TR1510457657; 51°16′39″N 1°04′58″E | | 1241984 | Remains of the Church of St George the Martyr Tower More images | Q17641326 |
| 23, St George's Street | II | 23, St George's Street | | | 24 November 1995 | TR1508457689; 51°16′40″N 1°04′57″E | | 1273515 | Upload Photo | Q26563254 |

=== St Radigund Street ===
| Name | Grade | Location | Type | Completed | Date designated | Grid ref. Geo-coordinates | Notes | Entry number | Image | Wikidata |
|---|---|---|---|---|---|---|---|---|---|---|
| 15, St Radigund Street | II | 15, St Radigund Street | | | 7 September 1973 | TR1502358234; 51°16′58″N 1°04′55″E | | 1065776 | Upload Photo | Q26318812 |
| 16, St Radigund Street | II | 16, St Radigund Street | | | 7 September 1973 | TR1501758234; 51°16′58″N 1°04′55″E | | 1357524 | Upload Photo | Q26640036 |
| The Miller's Arms Public House | II | 26, St Radigund Street | | | 7 September 1973 | TR1492158211; 51°16′57″N 1°04′50″E | | 1065777 | Upload Photo | Q26318813 |
| 27 and 28, St Radigund Street | II | 27 and 28, St Radigund Street | | | 7 September 1973 | TR1492958212; 51°16′57″N 1°04′50″E | | 1065778 | Upload Photo | Q26318814 |
| 42, St Radigund Street | II | 42, St Radigund Street | | | 7 September 1973 | TR1501458216; 51°16′57″N 1°04′55″E | | 1065779 | Upload Photo | Q26318815 |
| 39-41, St Radigunds Street | II | 39-41, St Radigunds Street | | | 7 September 1973 | TR1500358218; 51°16′57″N 1°04′54″E | | 1357525 | Upload Photo | Q26640037 |

=== Sun Street ===
| Name | Grade | Location | Type | Completed | Date designated | Grid ref. Geo-coordinates | Notes | Entry number | Image | Wikidata |
|---|---|---|---|---|---|---|---|---|---|---|
| 1, Sun Street | II | 1, Sun Street | | | 7 September 1973 | TR1494557921; 51°16′48″N 1°04′50″E | | 1242656 | Upload Photo | Q26535420 |
| 2, Sun Street | II | 2, Sun Street | | | 7 September 1973 | TR1494757915; 51°16′47″N 1°04′50″E | | 1242657 | Upload Photo | Q26535421 |
| 3 and 4, Sun Street | II | 3 and 4, Sun Street | | | 7 September 1973 | TR1494857905; 51°16′47″N 1°04′50″E | | 1259877 | Upload Photo | Q26550956 |
| 5 and 6, Sun Street | II | 5 and 6, Sun Street | | | 3 May 1967 | TR1494757894; 51°16′47″N 1°04′50″E | | 1259878 | Upload Photo | Q26550957 |
| The Sun Hotel | II | 7 and 8, Sun Street | | | 3 December 1949 | TR1495357876; 51°16′46″N 1°04′51″E | | 1242658 | The Sun Hotel More images | Q26535422 |
| 9, Sun Street | II | 9, Sun Street | | | 3 May 1967 | TR1495757871; 51°16′46″N 1°04′51″E | | 1242659 | 9, Sun Street More images | Q26535423 |
| 14 and 15, Sun Street | II | 14 and 15, Sun Street | | | 3 May 1967 | TR1497357865; 51°16′46″N 1°04′52″E | | 1242764 | Upload Photo | Q26535509 |
| 16 and 17, Sun Street | II | 16 and 17, Sun Street | | | 3 May 1967 | TR1496957874; 51°16′46″N 1°04′51″E | | 1242767 | 16 and 17, Sun Street More images | Q26535512 |
| 18 and 19, Sun Street | II | 18 and 19, Sun Street | | | 3 May 1967 | TR1496657882; 51°16′46″N 1°04′51″E | | 1259879 | 18 and 19, Sun Street More images | Q26550958 |
| 20 and 21, Sun Street | II | 20 and 21, Sun Street | | | 3 May 1967 | TR1496557893; 51°16′47″N 1°04′51″E | | 1259869 | Upload Photo | Q26550950 |
| 22-24, Sun Street | II | 22-24, Sun Street | | | 3 May 1967 | TR1496457907; 51°16′47″N 1°04′51″E | | 1259880 | 22-24, Sun Street More images | Q26550959 |

=== The Borough ===
| Name | Grade | Location | Type | Completed | Date designated | Grid ref. Geo-coordinates | Notes | Entry number | Image | Wikidata |
|---|---|---|---|---|---|---|---|---|---|---|
| Wall and Archway Between King's School and No 29 Palace Street | II | The Borough | | | 3 May 1967 | TR1506958115; 51°16′54″N 1°04′57″E | | 1248779 | Wall and Archway Between King's School and No 29 Palace Street More images | Q26540967 |
| 1 and 2, The Borough | II | 1 and 2, The Borough | | | 3 December 1949 | TR1509358176; 51°16′56″N 1°04′59″E | | 1277770 | 1 and 2, The Borough More images | Q26567161 |
| 3 and 4, The Borough | II | 3 and 4, The Borough | | | 7 September 1973 | TR1508858167; 51°16′55″N 1°04′58″E | | 1085136 | 3 and 4, The Borough More images | Q26370921 |
| 7, The Borough | II | 7, The Borough | | | 7 September 1973 | TR1508058156; 51°16′55″N 1°04′58″E | | 1085137 | 7, The Borough More images | Q26370928 |
| 8 and 9, The Borough | II | 8 and 9, The Borough | | | 7 September 1973 | TR1507858150; 51°16′55″N 1°04′58″E | | 1248757 | 8 and 9, The Borough More images | Q26540948 |
| 10-12, The Borough | II | 10-12, The Borough | | | 7 September 1973 | TR1507358144; 51°16′55″N 1°04′57″E | | 1085138 | 10-12, The Borough More images | Q26370933 |
| 13, The Borough | II | 13, The Borough | | | 7 September 1973 | TR1506958138; 51°16′54″N 1°04′57″E | | 1248765 | 13, The Borough | Q26540955 |
| 14 and 15, the Borough | II | 14 and 15, the Borough | | | 7 September 1973 | TR1506458132; 51°16′54″N 1°04′57″E | | 1085139 | 14 and 15, the Borough More images | Q26370940 |
| 16, The Borough | II | 16, The Borough | | | 7 September 1973 | TR1505958129; 51°16′54″N 1°04′57″E | | 1336780 | 16, The Borough More images | Q26621255 |
| 17 and 18, The Borough | II | 17 and 18, The Borough | | | 7 September 1973 | TR1505358127; 51°16′54″N 1°04′56″E | | 1248770 | 17 and 18, The Borough More images | Q26540959 |
| 19, The Borough | II | 19, The Borough | | | 7 September 1973 | TR1504858126; 51°16′54″N 1°04′56″E | | 1085140 | 19, The Borough More images | Q26370944 |
| 20 and 21, The Borough | II | 20 and 21, The Borough | | | 7 September 1973 | TR1503958129; 51°16′54″N 1°04′56″E | | 1336781 | 20 and 21, The Borough More images | Q26621256 |

=== The Cathedral Precincts ===
| Name | Grade | Location | Type | Completed | Date designated | Grid ref. Geo-coordinates | Notes | Entry number | Image | Wikidata |
|---|---|---|---|---|---|---|---|---|---|---|
| Christchurch Cathedral | I | The Cathedral Precincts | Cathedral church | | 3 December 1949 | TR1508457922; 51°16′47″N 1°04′57″E | | 1336823 | Christchurch Cathedral More images | Q29265 |
| Chapter House to Christchurch Cathedral | I | The Cathedral Precincts | | | 7 September 1973 | TR1510257950; 51°16′48″N 1°04′58″E | | 1085063 | Chapter House to Christchurch Cathedral More images | Q17529482 |
| Cloister to Christchurch Cathedral | I | The Cathedral Precincts | | | 3 December 1949 | TR1504857959; 51°16′49″N 1°04′56″E | | 1085062 | Cloister to Christchurch Cathedral More images | Q17529478 |
| Building Adjoining Green Court to Left Gateway From Court | II | The Cathedral Precincts | | | 3 December 1949 | TR1511858099; 51°16′53″N 1°05′00″E | | 1261721 | Upload Photo | Q26552651 |
| Buildings on West, North and East Sides of Mint Yard | II | The Cathedral Precincts | | | 7 September 1973 | TR1510958162; 51°16′55″N 1°04′59″E | | 1336793 | Buildings on West, North and East Sides of Mint Yard More images | Q26621268 |
| Cathedral Choir School | I | The Cathedral Precincts | | | 3 December 1949 | TR1519057958; 51°16′48″N 1°05′03″E | | 1252933 | Cathedral Choir School More images | Q97655921 |
| County of Kent War Memorial Cross | II* | The Cathedral Precincts | | | 16 May 2017 | TR1525857875; 51°16′46″N 1°05′06″E | | 1446080 | County of Kent War Memorial Cross More images | Q66478750 |
| Dark Entry | I | The Cathedral Precincts | | | 7 September 1973 | TR1510657958; 51°16′48″N 1°04′59″E | | 1085064 | Dark Entry More images | Q17529486 |
| Lavatory Tower | I | The Cathedral Precincts | | | 7 September 1973 | TR1512757958; 51°16′48″N 1°05′00″E | | 1336825 | Upload Photo | Q17529633 |
| Library of King's School | II | The Cathedral Precincts | | | 7 September 1973 | TR1512758116; 51°16′54″N 1°05′00″E | | 1085081 | Upload Photo | Q26370648 |
| Library to Christchurch Cathedral | I | The Cathedral Precincts | | | 7 September 1973 | TR1509957967; 51°16′49″N 1°04′58″E | | 1336824 | Upload Photo | Q17529629 |
| Norman Staircase | I | The Cathedral Precincts | | | 3 December 1949 | TR1513458107; 51°16′53″N 1°05′00″E | | 1253715 | Upload Photo | Q17529592 |
| Paving in Front of Number 18 | II | The Cathedral Precincts | | | 7 September 1973 | TR1519557944; 51°16′48″N 1°05′03″E | | 1336828 | Upload Photo | Q26621296 |
| Prior's Chapel | I | The Cathedral Precincts | | | 7 September 1973 | TR1514157951; 51°16′48″N 1°05′00″E | | 1085065 | Upload Photo | Q17529489 |
| Remains of Cellarer's Hall in Archbishop's Palace Garden | I | The Cathedral Precincts | | | 7 September 1973 | TR1505357999; 51°16′50″N 1°04′56″E | | 1085082 | Upload Photo | Q17529501 |
| Sundial in Front Garden of Archbishop's Palace | II | The Cathedral Precincts | | | 7 September 1973 | TR1500157974; 51°16′49″N 1°04′53″E | | 1085067 | Upload Photo | Q26370587 |
| The Archbishop's Palace or the Old Palace | I | The Cathedral Precincts | | | 3 May 1967 | TR1501557977; 51°16′49″N 1°04′54″E | | 1085066 | The Archbishop's Palace or the Old Palace More images | Q7084689 |
| Wall and Gate Piers Between Archbishop's Palace and Cathedral | II | The Cathedral Precincts | | | 7 September 1973 | TR1501557945; 51°16′48″N 1°04′54″E | | 1252881 | Upload Photo | Q26544708 |
| Wall and Gatepiers Between Nos 28 and 29 | II | The Cathedral Precincts | | | 7 September 1973 | TR1511358060; 51°16′52″N 1°04′59″E | | 1085080 | Upload Photo | Q26370644 |
| Wall Between No 18 and the Cathedral | II | The Cathedral Precincts | | | 7 September 1973 | TR1516657953; 51°16′48″N 1°05′02″E | | 1085077 | Upload Photo | Q26370640 |
| Wall Between Number 11 and Number 14 | II | The Cathedral Precincts | | | 7 September 1973 | TR1509057867; 51°16′46″N 1°04′58″E | | 1252898 | Upload Photo | Q26544724 |
| Wall in Garden of No 29 | II | The Cathedral Precincts | | | 7 September 1973 | TR1506158010; 51°16′50″N 1°04′56″E | | 1261758 | Upload Photo | Q26552686 |
| Wall on South and East Side of No 16 (Meister Omers) And Forming the West Wall of the Memorial Gardens | II | The Cathedral Precincts | | | 7 September 1973 | TR1523957881; 51°16′46″N 1°05′05″E | | 1085075 | Upload Photo | Q26370633 |
| Wall on South and North Side of Kent Memorial Garden | II | The Cathedral Precincts | | | 7 September 1973 | TR1524957854; 51°16′45″N 1°05′06″E | | 1085074 | Upload Photo | Q26370627 |
| Wall on West and South Side of No 16 (Meister Omers) Together With 3 Gate Piers | II | The Cathedral Precincts | | | 7 September 1973 | TR1521957894; 51°16′46″N 1°05′04″E | | 1252930 | Upload Photo | Q26544754 |
| Wall to left of Archbishop's Palace | II | The Cathedral Precincts | | | 7 September 1973 | TR1499957959; 51°16′49″N 1°04′53″E | | 1085068 | Upload Photo | Q26370594 |
| Water Tank Situated in Front of No 18 | II | The Cathedral Precincts | | | 7 September 1973 | TR1518957947; 51°16′48″N 1°05′03″E | | 1262022 | Upload Photo | Q26552925 |
| Wolfson Library | I | The Cathedral Precincts | | | 7 September 1973 | TR1514957959; 51°16′48″N 1°05′01″E | | 1336826 | Upload Photo | Q17529635 |
| 1, The Cathedral Precincts | II | 1, The Cathedral Precincts | | | 3 December 1949 | TR1498157873; 51°16′46″N 1°04′52″E | | 1252891 | 1, The Cathedral Precincts More images | Q26544718 |
| 2, The Cathedral Precincts | II | 2, The Cathedral Precincts | | | 3 May 1967 | TR1498357877; 51°16′46″N 1°04′52″E | | 1085069 | 2, The Cathedral Precincts More images | Q26370600 |
| 3, The Cathedral Precincts | II | 3, The Cathedral Precincts | | | 3 May 1967 | TR1498657881; 51°16′46″N 1°04′52″E | | 1085070 | 3, The Cathedral Precincts More images | Q26370605 |
| 4, The Cathedral Precincts | II | 4, The Cathedral Precincts | | | 3 May 1967 | TR1499057885; 51°16′46″N 1°04′53″E | | 1252894 | 4, The Cathedral Precincts More images | Q26544720 |
| 5, The Cathedral Precincts | II | 5, The Cathedral Precincts | | | 3 May 1967 | TR1499257891; 51°16′46″N 1°04′53″E | | 1085071 | 5, The Cathedral Precincts More images | Q26370611 |
| 6 and 7, The Cathedral Precincts | II | 6 and 7, The Cathedral Precincts | | | 3 May 1967 | TR1499757898; 51°16′47″N 1°04′53″E | | 1085072 | 6 and 7, The Cathedral Precincts More images | Q26370617 |
| 9, The Cathedral Precincts | II | 9, The Cathedral Precincts | | | 7 September 1973 | TR1500057927; 51°16′48″N 1°04′53″E | | 1252895 | 9, The Cathedral Precincts More images | Q26544721 |
| 11E, The Cathedral Precincts, 11A and 11B The Cathedral Precincts, 11C and 11D The Cathedral Precincts | II | 11E, The Cathedral Precincts, 11A and 11B The Cathedral Precincts, 11C and 11D The Cathedral Precincts | | | 3 December 1949 | TR1503457860; 51°16′45″N 1°04′55″E | | 1085073 | 11E, The Cathedral Precincts, 11A and 11B The Cathedral Precincts, 11C and 11D The Cathedral Precincts More images | Q26370622 |
| Meister Omers | I | 16, The Cathedral Precincts | | | 3 December 1949 | TR1524457920; 51°16′47″N 1°05′06″E | | 1336827 | Meister Omers More images | Q17529639 |
| 17, The Cathedral Precincts | II* | 17, The Cathedral Precincts | | | 3 December 1949 | TR1522857950; 51°16′48″N 1°05′05″E | | 1085076 | 17, The Cathedral Precincts More images | Q17557008 |
| Prior Sellinge Gate | I | 19, The Cathedral Precincts | | | 3 December 1949 | TR1515857988; 51°16′49″N 1°05′01″E | | 1336829 | Upload Photo | Q17529643 |
| The Cathedral Appeal Fund Office the Deanery | I | 21, The Cathedral Precincts | | | 3 December 1949 | TR1520658015; 51°16′50″N 1°05′04″E | | 1252941 | The Cathedral Appeal Fund Office the Deanery More images | Q17529584 |
| 22-26, The Cathedral Precincts | I | 22-26, The Cathedral Precincts | | | 3 May 1967 | TR1517658062; 51°16′52″N 1°05′03″E | | 1085078 | 22-26, The Cathedral Precincts More images | Q17529497 |
| 27 and 28, the Cathedral Precincts | I | 27 and 28, the Cathedral Precincts | | | 3 May 1967 | TR1508058095; 51°16′53″N 1°04′58″E | | 1252947 | 27 and 28, the Cathedral Precincts More images | Q17529588 |
| The Archdeacon of Canterbury's House | I | 29, The Cathedral Precincts | | | 3 December 1949 | TR1508758010; 51°16′50″N 1°04′58″E | | 1336791 | The Archdeacon of Canterbury's House More images | Q17529624 |
| Pilgrims Entry Or Pentise Attached to Number 29 | II* | 29, The Cathedral Precincts | | | 7 September 1973 | TR1508158043; 51°16′51″N 1°04′58″E | | 1085079 | Pilgrims Entry Or Pentise Attached to Number 29 More images | Q17557012 |
| 29A, The Cathedral Precincts | II | 29A, The Cathedral Precincts | | | 7 September 1973 | TR1511458012; 51°16′50″N 1°04′59″E | | 1336792 | 29A, The Cathedral Precincts More images | Q26621267 |

=== The Friars ===
| Name | Grade | Location | Type | Completed | Date designated | Grid ref. Geo-coordinates | Notes | Entry number | Image | Wikidata |
|---|---|---|---|---|---|---|---|---|---|---|
| 7 and 8, The Friars | II | 7 and 8, The Friars | | | 7 September 1973 | TR1486658012; 51°16′51″N 1°04′46″E | | 1260953 | 7 and 8, The Friars More images | Q26551936 |
| 9, The Friars | II | 9, The Friars | | | 7 September 1973 | TR1487258008; 51°16′50″N 1°04′47″E | | 1085058 | 9, The Friars More images | Q26370564 |

=== The Parade ===
| Name | Grade | Location | Type | Completed | Date designated | Grid ref. Geo-coordinates | Notes | Entry number | Image | Wikidata |
|---|---|---|---|---|---|---|---|---|---|---|
| 3, The Parade | II | 3, The Parade | | | 7 September 1973 | TR1497757778; 51°16′43″N 1°04′52″E | | 1260401 | 3, The Parade More images | Q26551418 |
| 4, The Parade | II | 4, The Parade | | | 7 September 1973 | TR1497357783; 51°16′43″N 1°04′51″E | | 1241647 | 4, The Parade More images | Q26534509 |
| 6A and 7, the Parade | II | 6A and 7, the Parade | | | 3 May 1967 | TR1495557798; 51°16′44″N 1°04′51″E | | 1241508 | 6A and 7, the Parade More images | Q26534383 |
| 8, The Parade | II | 8, The Parade | | | 3 May 1967 | TR1494257777; 51°16′43″N 1°04′50″E | | 1260483 | 8, The Parade More images | Q26551490 |
| 9, The Parade | II | 9, The Parade | | | 3 May 1967 | TR1494657775; 51°16′43″N 1°04′50″E | | 1241509 | 9, The Parade More images | Q26534384 |
| 10, The Parade | II | 10, The Parade | | | 7 September 1973 | TR1495357768; 51°16′43″N 1°04′50″E | | 1241653 | 10, The Parade More images | Q26534515 |
| 12, The Parade | II | 12, The Parade | | | 7 September 1973 | TR1497057754; 51°16′42″N 1°04′51″E | | 1260402 | 12, The Parade More images | Q26551419 |
| 13, The Parade | II | 13, The Parade | | | 7 September 1973 | TR1497457750; 51°16′42″N 1°04′51″E | | 1260381 | 13, The Parade More images | Q26551400 |

=== Turnagain Lane ===
| Name | Grade | Location | Type | Completed | Date designated | Grid ref. Geo-coordinates | Notes | Entry number | Image | Wikidata |
|---|---|---|---|---|---|---|---|---|---|---|
| 5 and 6, Turnagain Lane | II | 5 and 6, Turnagain Lane | | | 7 September 1973 | TR1494157994; 51°16′50″N 1°04′50″E | | 1259843 | 5 and 6, Turnagain Lane More images | Q26550926 |

== See also ==
- Grade I listed buildings in Kent
- Grade II* listed buildings in Kent

== Sources ==
- Newman, John (2013) [1969], Kent: North-East and East, The Buildings of England, New Haven and London: Yale University Press, ISBN 978-0-300-18506-5
