= Listed buildings in Canterbury (within city walls, west) =

Civil Parish in Kent, England

Canterbury is a city in Kent, England. The non-civil parish contains 1068 listed buildings that are recorded in the National Heritage List for England for Canterbury, Herne Bay and Whitstable. Of these 35 are grade I, 50 are grade II* and 983 are grade II.

This list covers the area within the city walls of Canterbury west of High Street and St Peter's Street. It is based on the information retrieved online from Historic England.

Further lists of listed buildings in Canterbury can be found here:

- City of Canterbury within the city walls, eastern part
- City of Canterbury within the city walls, north of the river Great Stour
- City of Canerbury outside the city wall, north of the river Great Stour
- City of Canerbury outside the city wall, south of the river Great Stour
- Herne Bay and Whitstable

== Key ==
Grade	Criteria
I	Buildings that are of exceptional interest
II*	Particularly important buildings of more than special interest
II	Buildings that are of special interest

== Listed buildings within the city walls west of High Street and St Peter's Street ==
=== Beer Cart Lane ===
Name	Grade	Location	Type	Completed (Note: The date given is the date used by Historic England as significant for the initial building or that of an important part in the structure's description.)	Date designated	Grid ref. (Note: The grid reference is based on the British national grid reference system, sometimes known as OSGB36, used by the Ordnance Survey.) Geo-coordinates	Notes	Entry number (Note: The "List Entry Number" is a unique number assigned to each listed building and scheduled monument by Historic England.)	Image	Wikidata
3, Beer Cart Lane	II	3, Beer Cart Lane			7 September 1973	TR1476057691; 51°16′40″N 1°04′40″E		1248641	Upload Photo	Q26540837
Garden Wall and Gatepiers to No 3	II	3, Beer Cart Lane			7 September 1973	TR1475757701; 51°16′41″N 1°04′40″E		1336754	Upload Photo	Q26621230
6 and 7, Beer Cart Lane	II	6 and 7, Beer Cart Lane			3 May 1967	TR1479657678; 51°16′40″N 1°04′42″E		1248642	Upload Photo	Q26540838
8, Beer Cart Lane	II	8, Beer Cart Lane			7 September 1973	TR1479257684; 51°16′40″N 1°04′42″E		1085165	Upload Photo	Q26371086
9, Beer Cart Lane	II	9, Beer Cart Lane			7 September 1973	TR1477957698; 51°16′41″N 1°04′41″E		1085166	9, Beer Cart Lane More images	Q26371092

=== Castle Row ===
Name	Grade	Location	Type	Completed	Date designated	Grid ref. Geo-coordinates	Notes	Entry number	Image	Wikidata
37-41, Castle Row	II	37-41, Castle Row			7 September 1973	TR1464657503; 51°16′34″N 1°04′34″E		1336798	Upload Photo	Q26621273

=== Castle Street ===
Name	Grade	Location	Type	Completed	Date designated	Grid ref. Geo-coordinates	Notes	Entry number	Image	Wikidata
Canterbury Castle	I	Castle Street			3 December 1949	TR1455357430; 51°16′32″N 1°04′29″E		1252100	Canterbury Castle More images	Q2968772
1 and 1A, Castle Street	II	1 and 1A, Castle Street			7 September 1973	TR1477457633; 51°16′38″N 1°04′41″E		1085087	Upload Photo	Q26370678
2, Castle Street	II*	2, Castle Street			3 May 1967	TR1476457626; 51°16′38″N 1°04′40″E		1085088	2, Castle Street More images	Q17557015
3, Castle Street	II	3, Castle Street			3 May 1967	TR1475857622; 51°16′38″N 1°04′40″E		1085089	Upload Photo	Q26370683
Margaret's House	II	4, Castle Street			3 May 1967	TR1475557617; 51°16′38″N 1°04′40″E		1262478	Upload Photo	Q26553349
Lullingstone House	II*	5, Castle Street			3 December 1949	TR1474957612; 51°16′38″N 1°04′40″E		1085090	Upload Photo	Q17557022
6 and 7, Castle Street	II	6 and 7, Castle Street			3 May 1967	TR1474057607; 51°16′38″N 1°04′39″E		1085091	Upload Photo	Q26370690
8 and 9, Castle Street	II	8 and 9, Castle Street			3 May 1967	TR1473257601; 51°16′37″N 1°04′39″E		1262464	Upload Photo	Q26553336
12-14, Castle Street	II	12-14, Castle Street			3 May 1967	TR1471357584; 51°16′37″N 1°04′38″E		1085092	Upload Photo	Q26370696
15, Castle Street	II	15, Castle Street			3 May 1967	TR1470457574; 51°16′37″N 1°04′37″E		1252090	Upload Photo	Q26543994
16-18, Castle Street	II	16-18, Castle Street			3 May 1967	TR1469957570; 51°16′36″N 1°04′37″E		1085093	Upload Photo	Q26370701
19-21, Castle Street	II	19-21, Castle Street			7 September 1973	TR1469057560; 51°16′36″N 1°04′36″E		1085094	Upload Photo	Q26370705
22 and 23, Castle Street	II	22 and 23, Castle Street			7 September 1973	TR1468357554; 51°16′36″N 1°04′36″E		1252091	Upload Photo	Q26543995
25, Castle Street	II	25, Castle Street			7 September 1973	TR1463557502; 51°16′34″N 1°04′33″E		1336799	Upload Photo	Q26621274
26, Castle Street	II	26, Castle Street			3 December 1949	TR1463057493; 51°16′34″N 1°04′33″E		1262426	Upload Photo	Q26553300
28, Castle Street	II	28, Castle Street			3 May 1967	TR1457157397; 51°16′31″N 1°04′30″E		1085095	28, Castle Street More images	Q26370711
40 and 41, Castle Street	II	40 and 41, Castle Street			7 September 1973	TR1460757491; 51°16′34″N 1°04′32″E		1085096	Upload Photo	Q26370716
42, Castle Street	II	42, Castle Street			7 September 1973	TR1461257496; 51°16′34″N 1°04′32″E		1336800	Upload Photo	Q26621275
43, Castle Street	II	43, Castle Street			7 September 1973	TR1461557499; 51°16′34″N 1°04′32″E		1252101	Upload Photo	Q26544004
44 and 45, Castle Street	II	44 and 45, Castle Street			7 September 1973	TR1461957505; 51°16′35″N 1°04′33″E		1085097	Upload Photo	Q26370723
46 and 47, Castle Street	II	46 and 47, Castle Street			7 September 1973	TR1462557512; 51°16′35″N 1°04′33″E		1336801	Upload Photo	Q26621276
48, Castle Street	II	48, Castle Street			7 September 1973	TR1463057518; 51°16′35″N 1°04′33″E		1262430	Upload Photo	Q26553303
49 and 50, Castle Street	II	49 and 50, Castle Street			3 May 1967	TR1464057529; 51°16′35″N 1°04′34″E		1085098	Upload Photo	Q26370727
51 and 52, Castle Street	II	51 and 52, Castle Street			3 May 1967	TR1464557536; 51°16′35″N 1°04′34″E		1252130	Upload Photo	Q26544032
53-55, Castle Street	II	53-55, Castle Street			3 May 1967	TR1465357543; 51°16′36″N 1°04′34″E		1085099	Upload Photo	Q26370734
56 and 57, Castle Street	II	56 and 57, Castle Street			3 May 1967	TR1465857549; 51°16′36″N 1°04′35″E		1336802	Upload Photo	Q26621277
58-63, Castle Street	II	58-63, Castle Street			3 May 1967	TR1467257565; 51°16′36″N 1°04′35″E		1252141	Upload Photo	Q26544042
64, Castle Street	II	64, Castle Street			3 May 1967	TR1468257577; 51°16′37″N 1°04′36″E		1085100	Upload Photo	Q26370739
65 and 66, Castle Street	II	65 and 66, Castle Street			3 May 1967	TR1468757582; 51°16′37″N 1°04′36″E		1262413	Upload Photo	Q26553288
67, Castle Street	II	67, Castle Street			7 September 1973	TR1469257590; 51°16′37″N 1°04′37″E		1336803	Upload Photo	Q26621278
68 and 68A, Castle Street	II*	68 and 68A, Castle Street			3 May 1967	TR1470457600; 51°16′37″N 1°04′37″E		1085101	68 and 68A, Castle Street More images	Q17557027
69, Castle Street	II*	69, Castle Street			3 May 1967	TR1471457608; 51°16′38″N 1°04′38″E		1252148	69, Castle Street More images	Q17557191
70 and 71, Castle Street	II	70 and 71, Castle Street			3 May 1967	TR1472257613; 51°16′38″N 1°04′38″E		1085102	70 and 71, Castle Street More images	Q26370744
72, Castle Street	II	72, Castle Street			3 May 1967	TR1472857619; 51°16′38″N 1°04′38″E		1336804	Upload Photo	Q26621279
73-75, Castle Street	II	73-75, Castle Street			3 May 1967	TR1473957630; 51°16′38″N 1°04′39″E		1252155	Upload Photo	Q26544052
76, Castle Street	II	76, Castle Street			3 May 1967	TR1474757638; 51°16′39″N 1°04′40″E		1085103	Upload Photo	Q26370749
77, Castle Street	II	77, Castle Street			7 September 1973	TR1475257643; 51°16′39″N 1°04′40″E		1085060	Upload Photo	Q26370575
80, Castle Street	II	80, Castle Street			3 May 1967	TR1477657659; 51°16′39″N 1°04′41″E		1336822	Upload Photo	Q26621295
81 and 81A, Castle Street, 82 Castle Street	II	81 and 81A, Castle Street, 82 Castle Street			3 May 1967	TR1478357664; 51°16′39″N 1°04′41″E		1085061	Upload Photo	Q26370581

=== Church Lane ===
Name	Grade	Location	Type	Completed	Date designated	Grid ref. Geo-coordinates	Notes	Entry number	Image	Wikidata
Church of St Mildred	I	Church Lane			3 December 1949	TR1450057514; 51°16′35″N 1°04′27″E		1085039	Church of St Mildred More images	Q17529474

=== Dane John ===
Name	Grade	Location	Type	Completed	Date designated	Grid ref. Geo-coordinates	Notes	Entry number	Image	Wikidata
Dane John Mound Pinnacle	II	Dane John			3 May 1967	TR1477257362; 51°16′30″N 1°04′40″E		1085047	Dane John Mound Pinnacle More images	Q26370500
Memorial to Christopher Marlowe	II	Dane John			7 September 1973	TR1480457438; 51°16′32″N 1°04′42″E		1085044	Upload Photo	Q26370483
Sundial	II	Dane John			7 September 1973	TR1476357441; 51°16′32″N 1°04′40″E		1085045	Upload Photo	Q26370488
The Invicta Engine Set on Plinth	II	Dane John			7 September 1973	TR1493457485; 51°16′33″N 1°04′49″E		1085043	Upload Photo	Q26370477
12 & 12A, 14 & 15 Dane John	II	12, 12A, 14, 15, Dane John			7 September 1973	TR1475157468; 51°16′33″N 1°04′39″E		1085046	Upload Photo	Q26370494
16-18, 19, 20-23 , Dane John	II	16-18, 19, 20-23 , Dane John			3 May 1967	TR1470057429; 51°16′32″N 1°04′37″E		1240486	Upload Photo	Q26533409
2-7, Dane John	II	2-7, Dane John			3 May 1967	TR1489457483; 51°16′33″N 1°04′47″E		1336816	Upload Photo	Q26621289
Former Municipal Buildings	II	8-10, Dane John			7 September 1973	TR1479357476; 51°16′33″N 1°04′42″E		1240482	Upload Photo	Q26533405

=== Gas Street ===
Name	Grade	Location	Type	Completed	Date designated	Grid ref. Geo-coordinates	Notes	Entry number	Image	Wikidata
Oasthouse	II	Gas Street			7 September 1973	TR1452357459; 51°16′33″N 1°04′28″E		1085017	Upload Photo	Q26370346

=== Hawks Lane ===
Name	Grade	Location	Type	Completed	Date designated	Grid ref. Geo-coordinates	Notes	Entry number	Image	Wikidata
1, Hawks Lane	II	1, Hawks Lane			7 September 1973	TR1484957703; 51°16′41″N 1°04′45″E		1260930	Upload Photo	Q26551913
13, Hawks Lane	II	13, Hawks Lane			3 February 1970	TR1477057755; 51°16′42″N 1°04′41″E		1336846	Upload Photo	Q26621311
14 and 15, Hawks Lane	II	14 and 15, Hawks Lane			3 February 1970	TR1476457758; 51°16′42″N 1°04′41″E		1260903	Upload Photo	Q26551887
2, Hawks Lane	II	2, Hawks Lane			7 September 1973	TR1483257717; 51°16′41″N 1°04′44″E		1085020	Upload Photo	Q26370364
Arnett House	II	22, Hawks Lane			7 September 1973	TR1481057760; 51°16′42″N 1°04′43″E		1085023	Upload Photo	Q26370383
6, Hawks Lane	II	6, Hawks Lane			3 May 1967	TR1481257727; 51°16′41″N 1°04′43″E		1085021	Upload Photo	Q26370370
Extension to No 6	II	6, Hawks Lane			7 September 1973	TR1481457720; 51°16′41″N 1°04′43″E		1240664	Upload Photo	Q26533579
7 and 8, Hawks Lane	II	7 and 8, Hawks Lane			3 May 1967	TR1480057734; 51°16′42″N 1°04′42″E		1336845	Upload Photo	Q26621310
9, Hawks Lane	II	9, Hawks Lane			3 May 1967	TR1478857742; 51°16′42″N 1°04′42″E		1260902	Upload Photo	Q26551886
10 and 11, Hawks Lane, 12 Hawks Lane	II	10 and 11, Hawks Lane, 12 Hawks Lane			3 May 1967	TR1477957748; 51°16′42″N 1°04′41″E		1085022	Upload Photo	Q26370376

=== Hospital Lane ===
Name	Grade	Location	Type	Completed	Date designated	Grid ref. Geo-coordinates	Notes	Entry number	Image	Wikidata
Maynard and Cotton's Hospital	II	1, 2, 5 and 6, Hospital Lane			3 May 1967	TR1464457626; 51°16′38″N 1°04′34″E		1240821	Upload Photo	Q26533720

=== Marlow Avenue ===
Name	Grade	Location	Type	Completed	Date designated	Grid ref. Geo-coordinates	Notes	Entry number	Image	Wikidata
2, Marlowe Avenue	II	2, Marlowe Avenue			7 September 1973	TR1483257548; 51°16′36″N 1°04′44″E		1097027	2, Marlowe Avenue More images	Q26389282
4, Marlowe Avenue	II	4, Marlowe Avenue			7 September 1973	TR1481557540; 51°16′35″N 1°04′43″E		1096949	4, Marlowe Avenue More images	Q26389206

=== St John's Lane ===
Name	Grade	Location	Type	Completed	Date designated	Grid ref. Geo-coordinates	Notes	Entry number	Image	Wikidata
No 13 and Attached Boundary Wall	II	St John's Lane			8 February 2007	TR1478057562; 51°16′36″N 1°04′41″E		1408393	Upload Photo	Q26676000
14, St John's Lane	II	14, St John's Lane			3 May 1967	TR1473657578; 51°16′37″N 1°04′39″E		1241917	Upload Photo	Q26534758

=== St Margaret's Street ===
Name	Grade	Location	Type	Completed	Date designated	Grid ref. Geo-coordinates	Notes	Entry number	Image	Wikidata
Church of St Margaret	II*	St Margaret's Street			3 December 1949	TR1488757741; 51°16′42″N 1°04′47″E		1241922	Church of St Margaret More images	Q17557165
1 and 2, St Margaret's Street	II	1 and 2, St Margaret's Street			3 December 1949	TR1482257651; 51°16′39″N 1°04′43″E		1260263	1 and 2, St Margaret's Street More images	Q26551298
5 and 6, St Margaret's Street	II	5 and 6, St Margaret's Street			3 May 1967	TR1483857664; 51°16′39″N 1°04′44″E		1242063	5 and 6, St Margaret's Street More images	Q26534893
7, St Margaret's Street	II	7, St Margaret's Street			3 May 1967	TR1484857670; 51°16′40″N 1°04′45″E		1241919	7, St Margaret's Street More images	Q26534760
8, St Margaret's Street	II	8, St Margaret's Street			3 December 1949	TR1486057682; 51°16′40″N 1°04′45″E		1260184	Upload Photo	Q26551234
19A, St Margaret's Street, 19 St Margaret's Street	II	19A, St Margaret's Street, 19 St Margaret's Street			3 May 1967	TR1491157737; 51°16′42″N 1°04′48″E		1260264	19A, St Margaret's Street, 19 St Margaret's Street More images	Q26551299
25A, St Margaret's Street, 26 St Margaret's Street, 25 St Margaret's Street	II	25A, St Margaret's Street, 26 St Margaret's Street, 25 St Margaret's Street			3 December 1949	TR1493757771; 51°16′43″N 1°04′50″E		1242079	25A, St Margaret's Street, 26 St Margaret's Street, 25 St Margaret's Street More images	Q26534907
27-29, St Margaret's Street	II	27-29, St Margaret's Street			3 May 1967	TR1491557765; 51°16′43″N 1°04′48″E		1241920	27-29, St Margaret's Street More images	Q26534761
29A and 29B, St Margaret's Street	II	29A and 29B, St Margaret's Street			3 May 1967	TR1490657755; 51°16′42″N 1°04′48″E		1242082	Upload Photo	Q26534910
30, St Margaret's Street	II	30, St Margaret's Street			3 May 1967	TR1490157749; 51°16′42″N 1°04′48″E		1260191	Upload Photo	Q26551241
31, St Margaret's Street	II	31, St Margaret's Street			3 May 1967	TR1486057736; 51°16′42″N 1°04′46″E		1260266	Upload Photo	Q26551301
32 and 32A, St Margaret's Street, 33 St Margaret's Street	II	32 and 32A, St Margaret's Street, 33 St Margaret's Street			3 May 1967	TR1487957723; 51°16′41″N 1°04′46″E		1260164	Upload Photo	Q26551217
34, St Margaret's Street	II	34, St Margaret's Street			3 May 1967	TR1487257717; 51°16′41″N 1°04′46″E		1241923	Upload Photo	Q26534763
35 and 35A, St Margaret's Street	II	35 and 35A, St Margaret's Street			3 May 1967	TR1486557711; 51°16′41″N 1°04′46″E		1260175	Upload Photo	Q26551227
36, St Margaret's Street	II	36, St Margaret's Street			3 May 1967	TR1485957706; 51°16′41″N 1°04′45″E		1241924	36, St Margaret's Street More images	Q26534764
38, 38A and 38B, St Margaret's Street	II	38, 38A and 38B, St Margaret's Street			3 December 1949	TR1482957682; 51°16′40″N 1°04′44″E		1242142	Upload Photo	Q26534961
39, St Margaret's Street	II	39, St Margaret's Street			3 May 1967	TR1482357677; 51°16′40″N 1°04′44″E		1260267	Upload Photo	Q26551302
40, St Margaret's Street	II	40, St Margaret's Street			3 May 1967	TR1481657671; 51°16′40″N 1°04′43″E		1260146	Upload Photo	Q26551199
41 and 42, St Margaret's Street	II	41 and 42, St Margaret's Street			7 September 1973	TR1480857666; 51°16′39″N 1°04′43″E		1241925	Upload Photo	Q26534765

=== St Mary's Street ===
Name	Grade	Location	Type	Completed	Date designated	Grid ref. Geo-coordinates	Notes	Entry number	Image	Wikidata
4 Bollards Situated at Edge of Churchyard	II	St Mary's Street			7 September 1973	TR1467257546; 51°16′36″N 1°04′35″E		1260152	Upload Photo	Q26551205
1-3, St Mary's Street	II	1-3, St Mary's Street			7 September 1973	TR1472657502; 51°16′34″N 1°04′38″E		1242305	Upload Photo	Q26535110
Building to Rear of No 3	II	3, St Mary's Street			7 September 1973	TR1472257489; 51°16′34″N 1°04′38″E		1242323	Upload Photo	Q26535128
4-7, St Mary's Street	II	4-7, St Mary's Street			7 September 1973	TR1473957491; 51°16′34″N 1°04′39″E		1242175	Upload Photo	Q26534989

=== Stour Street ===
Name	Grade	Location	Type	Completed	Date designated	Grid ref. Geo-coordinates	Notes	Entry number	Image	Wikidata
Pair of K6 Telephone Kiosks	II	Stour Street			1 October 2010	TR1478957869; 51°16′46″N 1°04′42″E		1393995	Upload Photo	Q26673125
Stour Vill	II	1-5, Stour Street			7 September 1973	TR1466357709; 51°16′41″N 1°04′35″E		1259904	Upload Photo	Q26550981
6, Stour Street, 6A Stour Street	II	6, Stour Street, 6A Stour Street			3 May 1967	TR1475857850; 51°16′45″N 1°04′41″E		1259933	Upload Photo	Q26551006
17, Stour Street	II	17, Stour Street			7 September 1973	TR1475657799; 51°16′44″N 1°04′40″E		1259897	Upload Photo	Q26550975
19, Stour Street	II	19, Stour Street			7 September 1973	TR1474757781; 51°16′43″N 1°04′40″E		1242650	Upload Photo	Q26535414
Poor Priests Hospital	I	20A and 21A, Stour Street			3 December 1949	TR1472757779; 51°16′43″N 1°04′39″E		1259898	Poor Priests Hospital More images	Q17529596
26, Stour Street	II	26, Stour Street			7 September 1973	TR1469257721; 51°16′41″N 1°04′37″E		1259907	Upload Photo	Q26550983
42A, Stour Street	II	42A, Stour Street			7 September 1973	TR1462557644; 51°16′39″N 1°04′33″E		1242651	42A, Stour Street More images	Q26535415
44-46, Stour Street	II	44-46, Stour Street			7 September 1973	TR1461157629; 51°16′39″N 1°04′32″E		1242727	44-46, Stour Street More images	Q26535480
47, Stour Street	II	47, Stour Street			3 May 1967	TR1460057624; 51°16′38″N 1°04′32″E		1242652	47, Stour Street More images	Q26535416
63 and 64, Stour Street	II	63 and 64, Stour Street			7 September 1973	TR1465457654; 51°16′39″N 1°04′35″E		1259908	Upload Photo	Q26550984
65-67, Stour Street	II	65-67, Stour Street			7 September 1973	TR1466157664; 51°16′40″N 1°04′35″E		1242729	Upload Photo	Q26535482
68 and 68A, Stour Street	II	68 and 68A, Stour Street			7 September 1973	TR1468457688; 51°16′40″N 1°04′36″E		1242653	Upload Photo	Q26535417
75, Stour Street	II	75, Stour Street			7 September 1973	TR1476757782; 51°16′43″N 1°04′41″E		1242654	Upload Photo	Q26535418

=== Watling Street ===
Name	Grade	Location	Type	Completed	Date designated	Grid ref. Geo-coordinates	Notes	Entry number	Image	Wikidata
16, Watling Street	II*	16, Watling Street			3 December 1949	TR1485857592; 51°16′37″N 1°04′45″E		1242830	16, Watling Street More images	Q17557172
Wall to No 16	II	16, Watling Street			7 September 1973	TR1485757583; 51°16′37″N 1°04′45″E		1242789	Upload Photo	Q26535528
23, Watling Street	II	23, Watling Street			3 May 1967	TR1482757631; 51°16′38″N 1°04′44″E		1242837	Upload Photo	Q26535567
The Three Tuns	II	24, Watling Street			3 May 1967	TR1479857646; 51°16′39″N 1°04′42″E		1242790	Upload Photo	Q26535529
24A and 25, Watling Street	II	24A and 25, Watling Street			3 December 1949	TR1480857634; 51°16′38″N 1°04′43″E		1259828	Upload Photo	Q26550911
Latchmere House	II	26, Watling Street			3 May 1967	TR1481357623; 51°16′38″N 1°04′43″E		1259865	Upload Photo	Q26550946
27, Watling Street	II	27, Watling Street			3 May 1967	TR1481657614; 51°16′38″N 1°04′43″E		1259829	Upload Photo	Q26550912
28, Watling Street	II	28, Watling Street			7 September 1973	TR1481857609; 51°16′38″N 1°04′43″E		1242791	Upload Photo	Q26535530
34 and 34A, Watling Street	II	34 and 34A, Watling Street			7 September 1973	TR1484557568; 51°16′36″N 1°04′44″E		1259830	Upload Photo	Q26550913

=== Whitehorse Lane ===
Name	Grade	Location	Type	Completed	Date designated	Grid ref. Geo-coordinates	Notes	Entry number	Image	Wikidata
Cherry Tree Inn	II	10, Whitehorse Lane			7 September 1973	TR1483457839; 51°16′45″N 1°04′44″E		1242876	Upload Photo	Q26535601

=== Worthgare Place ===
Name	Grade	Location	Type	Completed	Date designated	Grid ref. Geo-coordinates	Notes	Entry number	Image	Wikidata
Sylvan House	II	Worthgare Place			7 September 1973	TR1460457374; 51°16′30″N 1°04′32″E		1259755	Upload Photo	Q26550848
Worthgate House	II	Worthgare Place			7 September 1973	TR1462557364; 51°16′30″N 1°04′33″E		1258065	Upload Photo	Q26549351
Worthgate Place	II	1-8, Worthgare Place			7 September 1973	TR1468157443; 51°16′32″N 1°04′36″E		1259753	Upload Photo	Q26550846
Don Jon House	II	12, Worthgate Place			14 September 1976	TR1461657383; 51°16′31″N 1°04′32″E		1258230	Upload Photo	Q26549489
9 and 10, Worthgate Place	II	9 and 10, Worthgate Place			7 September 1973	TR1466857421; 51°16′32″N 1°04′35″E		1258060	Upload Photo	Q26549349

== See also ==
- Grade I listed buildings in Kent
- Grade II* listed buildings in Kent

== Sources ==
- Newman, John (2013) [1969], Kent: North-East and East, The Buildings of England, New Haven and London: Yale University Press, ISBN 978-0-300-18506-5
