= Listed buildings in Canterbury (outside city walls, north) =

Civil Parish in Kent, England

Canterbury is a city in Kent, England. The non-civil parish contains 1068 listed buildings that are recorded in the National Heritage List for England for Canterbury, Whitstable and Herne Bay. Of these 35 are grade I, 50 are grade II* and 983 are grade II.

This list covers the area in Canterbury outside the city walls north of the river Great Stour. It is based on the information retrieved online from Historic England.

Further lists of listed buildings in Canterbury can be found here:

- City of Canterbury within the city walls, eastern part
- City of Canterbury within the city walls, western part
- City of Canterbury within the city walls, north of the river Great Stour
- City of Canerbury outside the city wall, south of the river Great Stour
- Herne Bay and Whitstable

== Key ==
Grade	Criteria
I	Buildings that are of exceptional interest
II*	Particularly important buildings of more than special interest
II	Buildings that are of special interest

== Listing ==
=== Beaconsfield Road ===
Name	Grade	Location	Type	Completed (Note: The date given is the date used by Historic England as significant for the initial building or that of an important part in the structure's description.)	Date designated	Grid ref. (Note: The grid reference is based on the British national grid reference system, sometimes known as OSGB36, used by the Ordnance Survey.) Geo-coordinates	Notes	Entry number (Note: The "List Entry Number" is a unique number assigned to each listed building and scheduled monument by Historic England.)	Image	Wikidata
The Beverley Farm Footpath Arch	II	Beaconsfield Road			1 September 2010	TR1456158764; 51°17′15″N 1°04′32″E		1393936	Upload Photo	Q26673070

=== Cherry Garden Road ===
Name	Grade	Location	Type	Completed	Date designated	Grid ref. Geo-coordinates	Notes	Entry number	Image	Wikidata
Cherry Garden Farmhouse	II	22, Cherry Garden Road			3 May 1967	TR1356858686; 51°17′14″N 1°03′41″E		1085038	Upload Photo	Q26370453

=== Cross Street ===
Name	Grade	Location	Type	Completed	Date designated	Grid ref. Geo-coordinates	Notes	Entry number	Image	Wikidata
11-18, Cross Street	II	11-18, Cross Street			7 September 1973	TR1422458206; 51°16′58″N 1°04′14″E		1336815	Upload Photo	Q26621288

=== Forty Acres Road ===
Name	Grade	Location	Type	Completed	Date designated	Grid ref. Geo-coordinates	Notes	Entry number	Image	Wikidata
2, Forty Acres Road	II	2, Forty Acres Road			7 September 1973	TR1422858402; 51°17′04″N 1°04′14″E		1240580	Upload Photo	Q26533498
4, Forty Acres Road	II	4, Forty Acres Road			7 September 1973	TR1423158405; 51°17′04″N 1°04′15″E		1085057	Upload Photo	Q26370559
5, Forty Acres Road	II	5, Forty Acres Road			7 September 1973	TR1423558411; 51°17′04″N 1°04′15″E		1336820	Upload Photo	Q26621293

=== Giles Lane ===
Name	Grade	Location	Type	Completed	Date designated	Grid ref. Geo-coordinates	Notes	Entry number	Image	Wikidata
Father Courage	II	University of Kent Campus			19 January 2016	TR1410759934; 51°17′54″N 1°04′11″E		1430801	Upload Photo	Q26677650

=== Hales Drive ===
Name	Grade	Location	Type	Completed	Date designated	Grid ref. Geo-coordinates	Notes	Entry number	Image	Wikidata
Church of St Stephen	I	Hales Drive			3 December 1949	TR1483259158; 51°17′28″N 1°04′47″E		1336844	Upload Photo	Q17529647

=== Headcorn Drive ===
Name	Grade	Location	Type	Completed	Date designated	Grid ref. Geo-coordinates	Notes	Entry number	Image	Wikidata
Folly Farm including attached garden wall and former stables	II	Headcorn Drive			28 February 2008	TR1558559665; 51°17′43″N 1°05′27″E		1392427	Upload Photo	Q26671647

=== Kirby's Lane ===
Name	Grade	Location	Type	Completed	Date designated	Grid ref. Geo-coordinates	Notes	Entry number	Image	Wikidata
Industrial Building to South East of No 13	II	11, Kirby's Lane			7 September 1973	TR1457658233; 51°16′58″N 1°04′32″E		1240920	Upload Photo	Q26533816
13, Kirby's Lane	II	13, Kirby's Lane			7 September 1973	TR1456458244; 51°16′58″N 1°04′31″E		1240918	Upload Photo	Q26533814
14 and 15, Kirby's Lane	II	14 and 15, Kirby's Lane			7 September 1973	TR1457458263; 51°16′59″N 1°04′32″E		1240921	Upload Photo	Q26533817

=== Leycroft Close ===
Name	Grade	Location	Type	Completed	Date designated	Grid ref. Geo-coordinates	Notes	Entry number	Image	Wikidata
1, Leycroft Close	II	1, Leycroft Close			5 November 2010	TR1448359064; 51°17′25″N 1°04′29″E		1395805	Upload Photo	Q26674642

=== Linden Grove ===
Name	Grade	Location	Type	Completed	Date designated	Grid ref. Geo-coordinates	Notes	Entry number	Image	Wikidata
Westgate Court	II	1, Linden Grove			3 December 1949	TR1444158074; 51°16′53″N 1°04′25″E		1240923	Westgate Court More images	Q26533819
Linden House	II	2, Linden Grove			3 December 1949	TR1447258086; 51°16′53″N 1°04′26″E		1240924	Upload Photo	Q26533820
Railings and Gate Piers to No 2	II	2, Linden Grove			7 September 1973	TR1448158082; 51°16′53″N 1°04′27″E		1260768	Upload Photo	Q26551762
9-12 Linden Grove, Linden Grove	II	9-12 Linden Grove, Linden Grove			7 September 1973	TR1450258120; 51°16′55″N 1°04′28″E		1240933	Upload Photo	Q26533829

=== London Road ===
Name	Grade	Location	Type	Completed	Date designated	Grid ref. Geo-coordinates	Notes	Entry number	Image	Wikidata
1, London Road	II	1, London Road			3 December 1949	TR1422258355; 51°17′03″N 1°04′14″E		1079086	Upload Photo	Q26350701
10 and 11, London Road	II	10 and 11, London Road			7 September 1973	TR1417158327; 51°17′02″N 1°04′11″E		1079089	Upload Photo	Q26350716
Paving and Cobbles in Front of Nos 1 to 15	II	1-15, London Road			7 September 1973	TR1417858322; 51°17′02″N 1°04′12″E		1260735	Upload Photo	Q26551730
12, London Road	II	12, London Road			7 September 1973	TR1416358324; 51°17′02″N 1°04′11″E		1260733	Upload Photo	Q26551728
13 and 14, London Road	II	13 and 14, London Road			7 September 1973	TR1415658319; 51°17′01″N 1°04′11″E		1079090	Upload Photo	Q26350721
15, London Road	II	15, London Road			7 September 1973	TR1414758314; 51°17′01″N 1°04′10″E		1079091	Upload Photo	Q26350724
2, London Road	II	2, London Road			3 December 1949	TR1421658351; 51°17′02″N 1°04′14″E		1079087	Upload Photo	Q26350706
20-23, London Road	II	20-23, London Road			7 September 1973	TR1411858292; 51°17′01″N 1°04′08″E		1241019	Upload Photo	Q26533913
25 and 26, London Road	II	25 and 26, London Road			7 September 1973	TR1410558283; 51°17′00″N 1°04′08″E		1241020	Upload Photo	Q26533914
27-33, London Road	II	27-33, London Road			7 September 1973	TR1408958276; 51°17′00″N 1°04′07″E		1260737	Upload Photo	Q26551732
3, London Road	II	3, London Road			3 December 1949	TR1421058348; 51°17′02″N 1°04′13″E		1079088	Upload Photo	Q26350711
35-38, London Road	II	35-38, London Road			7 September 1973	TR1406158262; 51°17′00″N 1°04′05″E		1241022	Upload Photo	Q26533916
4 and 5, London Road	II	4 and 5, London Road			3 May 1967	TR1419958342; 51°17′02″N 1°04′13″E		1240996	Upload Photo	Q26533890
Aucher Close	II	41-46, London Road			7 September 1973	TR1398358246; 51°16′59″N 1°04′01″E		1241023	Upload Photo	Q26533917
Stone wall to Aucher Close	II	41-46, London Road			7 September 1973	TR1399658224; 51°16′59″N 1°04′02″E		1241024	Upload Photo	Q26533918
6 and 7, London Road	II	6 and 7, London Road			7 September 1973	TR1419058335; 51°17′02″N 1°04′12″E		1358909	Upload Photo	Q26641257
66A and 66B, London Road	II	66A and 66B, London Road			7 September 1973	TR1408958253; 51°16′59″N 1°04′07″E		1241025	Upload Photo	Q26533919
67-72, London Road	II	67-72, London Road			7 September 1973	TR1410358262; 51°17′00″N 1°04′08″E		1241026	Upload Photo	Q26533920
73-78, London Road	II	73-78, London Road			7 September 1973	TR1414358282; 51°17′00″N 1°04′10″E		1241027	Upload Photo	Q26533921
79, London Road	II	79, London Road			7 September 1973	TR1417358301; 51°17′01″N 1°04′11″E		1241028	Upload Photo	Q26533922
8 and 9, London Road	II	8 and 9, London Road			3 May 1967	TR1418058331; 51°17′02″N 1°04′12″E		1241008	Upload Photo	Q26533902

=== New Street ===
Name	Grade	Location	Type	Completed	Date designated	Grid ref. Geo-coordinates	Notes	Entry number	Image	Wikidata
17, New Street	II	17, New Street			7 September 1973	TR1421258195; 51°16′57″N 1°04′13″E		1096941	Upload Photo	Q26389200
Orchard Lodge	II	23, New Street			7 September 1973	TR1418858196; 51°16′57″N 1°04′12″E		1241040	Upload Photo	Q26533934
Orchard House	II	28, New Street			7 September 1973	TR1411758264; 51°17′00″N 1°04′08″E		1096943	Upload Photo	Q26389202

=== North Lane ===
Name	Grade	Location	Type	Completed	Date designated	Grid ref. Geo-coordinates	Notes	Entry number	Image	Wikidata
Weighbridge Cottage	II	North Lane			7 September 1973	TR1473558338; 51°17′01″N 1°04′40″E		1241140	Upload Photo	Q26534028
K6 Telephone Kiosk Adjacent to the Westgate	II	North Lane			25 November 1987	TR1459158120; 51°16′54″N 1°04′33″E		1258124	K6 Telephone Kiosk Adjacent to the Westgate More images	Q26549403
K6 Telephone Kiosk Adjacent to the Westgate	II	North Lane			25 November 1987	TR1459158121; 51°16′54″N 1°04′33″E		1259746	K6 Telephone Kiosk Adjacent to the Westgate More images	Q26681999
1 and 2, North Lane	II	1 and 2, North Lane			7 September 1973	TR1458058142; 51°16′55″N 1°04′32″E		1260670	1 and 2, North Lane More images	Q26551669
The Falstaff Tap	II	4, North Lane			7 September 1973	TR1459258155; 51°16′56″N 1°04′33″E		1260677	The Falstaff Tap More images	Q26551675
5, North Lane	II	5, North Lane			7 September 1973	TR1460158164; 51°16′56″N 1°04′33″E		1241117	5, North Lane More images	Q26534006
6, North Lane	II	6, North Lane			3 May 1967	TR1460758170; 51°16′56″N 1°04′33″E		1241131	6, North Lane More images	Q26534019
8, North Lane, 7A North Lane, 7 North Lane	II	8, North Lane, 7A North Lane, 7 North Lane			3 May 1967	TR1461558178; 51°16′56″N 1°04′34″E		1241132	8, North Lane, 7A North Lane, 7 North Lane More images	Q26534020
8A and 8B, North Lane	II	8A and 8B, North Lane			7 September 1973	TR1462858192; 51°16′57″N 1°04′35″E		1241118	8A and 8B, North Lane More images	Q26534007
9, North Lane	II	9, North Lane			7 September 1973	TR1463458197; 51°16′57″N 1°04′35″E		1241134	9, North Lane More images	Q26534022
10 and 11, North Lane	II	10 and 11, North Lane			7 September 1973	TR1463758201; 51°16′57″N 1°04′35″E		1260680	10 and 11, North Lane More images	Q26551678
12 and 12A, North Lane	II	12 and 12A, North Lane			7 September 1973	TR1464158204; 51°16′57″N 1°04′35″E		1241135	12 and 12A, North Lane More images	Q26534023
13, North Lane	II	13, North Lane			7 September 1973	TR1464458207; 51°16′57″N 1°04′35″E		1260681	13, North Lane More images	Q26551679
14 and 15, North Lane	II	14 and 15, North Lane			7 September 1973	TR1464958211; 51°16′57″N 1°04′36″E		1241136	14 and 15, North Lane More images	Q26534024
20, North Lane	II	20, North Lane			7 September 1973	TR1465758224; 51°16′58″N 1°04′36″E		1260682	20, North Lane More images	Q26551680
22 and 23, North Lane	II	22 and 23, North Lane			7 September 1973	TR1467158236; 51°16′58″N 1°04′37″E		1241137	22 and 23, North Lane More images	Q26534025
Blue Anchor Inn	II	25, North Lane			3 May 1967	TR1468858260; 51°16′59″N 1°04′38″E		1241138	Blue Anchor Inn More images	Q26534026
26, North Lane	II	26, North Lane			3 May 1967	TR1469258266; 51°16′59″N 1°04′38″E		1260683	26, North Lane More images	Q26551681
27, North Lane	II	27, North Lane			3 May 1967	TR1469558270; 51°16′59″N 1°04′38″E		1241139	27, North Lane More images	Q26534027
37, North Lane	II	37, North Lane			7 September 1973	TR1473158315; 51°17′01″N 1°04′40″E		1260684	37, North Lane More images	Q26551682
39, 40, North Lane, 16 St Stephen's Field	II	40, North Lane, 16 St Stephen's Field			3 December 1949	TR1475058352; 51°17′02″N 1°04′41″E		1065780	39, 40, North Lane, 16 St Stephen's Field More images	Q26318816
49, North Lane	II	49, North Lane			23 March 1976	TR1467358206; 51°16′57″N 1°04′37″E		1273525	49, North Lane More images	Q26563262

=== Orchard Street ===
Name	Grade	Location	Type	Completed	Date designated	Grid ref. Geo-coordinates	Notes	Entry number	Image	Wikidata
2-4, Orchard Street, 1B Orchard Street	II	2-4, Orchard Street, 1B Orchard Street			7 September 1973	TR1430758190; 51°16′57″N 1°04′18″E		1260534	Upload Photo	Q26551540
5 and 6, Orchard Street	II	5 and 6, Orchard Street			7 September 1973	TR1430058182; 51°16′57″N 1°04′18″E		1241383	Upload Photo	Q26534264
7 and 8, Orchard Street	II	7 and 8, Orchard Street			7 September 1973	TR1429258171; 51°16′56″N 1°04′17″E		1241402	Upload Photo	Q26534284
Black Horse Inn	II	9 and 10, Orchard Street			7 September 1973	TR1427558151; 51°16′56″N 1°04′16″E		1260535	Upload Photo	Q26551541
18 and 19, Orchard Street	II	18 and 19, Orchard Street			7 September 1973	TR1426158132; 51°16′55″N 1°04′16″E		1241384	Upload Photo	Q26534265
20 and 21, Orchard Street	II	20 and 21, Orchard Street			7 September 1973	TR1425558125; 51°16′55″N 1°04′15″E		1270254	Upload Photo	Q26560314
Gothic Cottage Shakespear Cottage	II	22, Orchard Street			7 September 1973	TR1424858116; 51°16′55″N 1°04′15″E		1260519	Upload Photo	Q26551525
St Dunston's Terrace	II	24 and 25, Orchard Street			3 May 1967	TR1423858108; 51°16′55″N 1°04′14″E		1260520	Upload Photo	Q26551526
Vine House	II	44, Orchard Street			7 September 1973	TR1430358220; 51°16′58″N 1°04′18″E		1241430	Upload Photo	Q26534312

=== St Dunstan's Street ===
Name	Grade	Location	Type	Completed	Date designated	Grid ref. Geo-coordinates	Notes	Entry number	Image	Wikidata
The Church of St Dunstan's Without the West Gate	I	St Dunstan's Street			3 December 1949	TR1424058314; 51°17′01″N 1°04′15″E	Early Norman nave, decorated S aisle, perpendicular SW tower, external SW chapel rebuilt c. 1524 for John Roper	1241793	The Church of St Dunstan's Without the West Gate More images	Q7587772
K6 Telephone Kiosk Outside St Dunstan's Church	II	St Dunstan's Street			25 November 1987	TR1425758325; 51°17′01″N 1°04′16″E		1258153	Upload Photo	Q26549427
The Roper Gate	II*	St Dunstan's Street			7 September 1973	TR1434258284; 51°17′00″N 1°04′20″E		1241835	The Roper Gate More images	Q17557153
Building Adjoining to North of Roper Gateway	II	St Dunstan's Street			7 September 1973	TR1433258291; 51°17′00″N 1°04′20″E		1241791	Upload Photo	Q26534645
5, St Dunstan's Street	II	5, St Dunstan's Street			3 December 1949	TR1456958124; 51°16′55″N 1°04′31″E		1241786	5, St Dunstan's Street More images	Q26534640
6, St Dunstan's Street	II	6, St Dunstan's Street			3 May 1967	TR1456558126; 51°16′55″N 1°04′31″E		1260351	6, St Dunstan's Street More images	Q26551373
7, St Dunstan's Street	II	7, St Dunstan's Street			3 May 1967	TR1455958130; 51°16′55″N 1°04′31″E		1241787	7, St Dunstan's Street More images	Q26534641
The Falstaff Hotel	II	8-10, St Dunstan's Street			3 December 1949	TR1454758139; 51°16′55″N 1°04′30″E		1260352	The Falstaff Hotel More images	Q26551374
12 and 12A, St Dunstan's Street, 11 St Dunstan's Street, 13 St Dunstan's Street	II	12 and 12A, St Dunstan's Street, 11 St Dunstan's Street, 13 St Dunstan's Street			3 May 1967	TR1453558148; 51°16′55″N 1°04′30″E		1241788	12 and 12A, St Dunstan's Street, 11 St Dunstan's Street, 13 St Dunstan's Street More images	Q26534642
14 and 15, St Dunstan's Street	II	14 and 15, St Dunstan's Street			7 September 1973	TR1452658153; 51°16′56″N 1°04′29″E		1241789	14 and 15, St Dunstan's Street More images	Q26534643
16, St Dunstan's Street	II	16, St Dunstan's Street			7 September 1973	TR1452258157; 51°16′56″N 1°04′29″E		1241808	16, St Dunstan's Street More images	Q26534661
25-27, St Dunstan's Street	II	25-27, St Dunstan's Street			7 September 1973	TR1444558210; 51°16′58″N 1°04′25″E		1260353	Upload Photo	Q26551375
29, St Dunstan's Street	II	29, St Dunstan's Street			7 September 1973	TR1437558257; 51°16′59″N 1°04′22″E		1241790	Upload Photo	Q26534644
30, St Dunstan's Street	II	30, St Dunstan's Street			7 September 1973	TR1436958259; 51°16′59″N 1°04′21″E		1241834	Upload Photo	Q26534686
The Vicarage	II	31, St Dunstan's Street			3 December 1949	TR1436258266; 51°16′59″N 1°04′21″E		1260354	Upload Photo	Q26551376
34 and 35, St Dunstan's Street	II	34 and 35, St Dunstan's Street			7 September 1973	TR1426458341; 51°17′02″N 1°04′16″E		1241845	Upload Photo	Q26534694
36, St Dunstan's Street	II	36, St Dunstan's Street			3 May 1967	TR1425958347; 51°17′02″N 1°04′16″E		1241792	Upload Photo	Q26534646
The Monument Inn	II	37, St Dunstan's Street			3 May 1967	TR1425458354; 51°17′02″N 1°04′16″E		1260304	The Monument Inn More images	Q26551334
38, St Dunstan's Street	II	38, St Dunstan's Street			3 December 1949	TR1424958360; 51°17′03″N 1°04′15″E		1260355	Upload Photo	Q26551377
39-42, St Dunstan's Street	II	39-42, St Dunstan's Street			7 September 1973	TR1429158294; 51°17′00″N 1°04′17″E		1260310	Upload Photo	Q26551339
St Dunstsan's Cottage	II	43, St Dunstan's Street			3 May 1967	TR1430258286; 51°17′00″N 1°04′18″E		1241864	Upload Photo	Q26534711
St Dunstan's House	II	45, St Dunstan's Street			3 December 1949	TR1431358277; 51°17′00″N 1°04′19″E		1241865	Upload Photo	Q26534712
51, St Dunstan's Street	II	51, St Dunstan's Street			7 September 1973	TR1435158247; 51°16′59″N 1°04′20″E		1241866	Upload Photo	Q26534713
52, St Dunstan's Street	II	52, St Dunstan's Street			7 September 1973	TR1435558244; 51°16′59″N 1°04′21″E		1241867	Upload Photo	Q26534714
53-55, St Dunstan's Street	II	53-55, St Dunstan's Street			3 May 1967	TR1436158239; 51°16′59″N 1°04′21″E		1241868	Upload Photo	Q26534715
56, St Dunstan's Street	II	56, St Dunstan's Street			3 May 1967	TR1437058232; 51°16′58″N 1°04′21″E		1241869	Upload Photo	Q26534716
57 and 58, St Dunstan's Street	II	57 and 58, St Dunstan's Street			3 May 1967	TR1437558228; 51°16′58″N 1°04′22″E		1241870	Upload Photo	Q26534717
59, St Dunstan's Street	II	59, St Dunstan's Street			3 May 1967	TR1438058225; 51°16′58″N 1°04′22″E		1241871	Upload Photo	Q26534718
60 and 60A, St Dunstan's Street	II	60 and 60A, St Dunstan's Street			7 September 1973	TR1438658221; 51°16′58″N 1°04′22″E		1241872	Upload Photo	Q26534719
The Unicorn Inn	II	61, St Dunstan's Street			7 September 1973	TR1439358215; 51°16′58″N 1°04′23″E		1260311	The Unicorn Inn More images	Q26551340
Westgate Cottage	II	62, St Dunstan's Street			3 May 1967	TR1440058211; 51°16′58″N 1°04′23″E		1241873	Upload Photo	Q26534720
65 and 66, St Dunstan's Street	II	65 and 66, St Dunstan's Street			7 September 1973	TR1440858206; 51°16′57″N 1°04′23″E		1260312	Upload Photo	Q26551341
67 and 68, St Dunstan's Street	II	67 and 68, St Dunstan's Street			7 September 1973	TR1442658195; 51°16′57″N 1°04′24″E		1241874	Upload Photo	Q26534721
69, St Dunstan's Street	II	69, St Dunstan's Street			3 May 1967	TR1443358190; 51°16′57″N 1°04′25″E		1241883	Upload Photo	Q26534727
70, St Dunstan's Street	II	70, St Dunstan's Street			7 September 1973	TR1443758187; 51°16′57″N 1°04′25″E		1241875	Upload Photo	Q26534722
House of Agnes Hotel	II*	71, St Dunstan's Street			3 December 1949	TR1444558179; 51°16′57″N 1°04′25″E		1260281	House of Agnes Hotel More images	Q17557200
72, St Dunstan's Street	II	72, St Dunstan's Street			3 December 1949	TR1445558173; 51°16′56″N 1°04′26″E		1260313	72, St Dunstan's Street More images	Q26551342
Part of the Rose and Crown Inn	II	73-75, St Dunstan's Street			3 May 1967	TR1446558165; 51°16′56″N 1°04′26″E		1241907	Part of the Rose and Crown Inn More images	Q26534749
Number 77 (Part of the Rose and Crown Inn) , Numbers 78 and 79	II*	77, 78 and 79, St Dunstan's Street			3 December 1949	TR1447958155; 51°16′56″N 1°04′27″E		1241876	Number 77 (Part of the Rose and Crown Inn) , Numbers 78 and 79 More images	Q17557158
80, St Dunstan's Street	II	80, St Dunstan's Street			7 September 1973	TR1448658151; 51°16′56″N 1°04′27″E		1241908	80, St Dunstan's Street More images	Q26534750
81, St Dunstan's Street	II	81, St Dunstan's Street			7 September 1973	TR1449258146; 51°16′55″N 1°04′27″E		1241909	81, St Dunstan's Street More images	Q26534751
85 and 86, St Dunstan's Street	II	85 and 86, St Dunstan's Street			3 May 1967	TR1450958133; 51°16′55″N 1°04′28″E		1241910	85 and 86, St Dunstan's Street More images	Q26534752
Garden Wall and Gate Piers to No 87	II	87, St Dunstan's Street			7 September 1973	TR1448158065; 51°16′53″N 1°04′27″E		1241912	Garden Wall and Gate Piers to No 87 More images	Q26534753
Westgate House	II*	87, St Dunstan's Street			3 December 1949	TR1452558123; 51°16′55″N 1°04′29″E		1241911	Westgate House More images	Q17557162
88, St Dunstan's Street	II	88, St Dunstan's Street			3 May 1967	TR1453658116; 51°16′54″N 1°04′30″E		1260294	88, St Dunstan's Street More images	Q26551326
89 and 90, St Dunstan's Street	II	89 and 90, St Dunstan's Street			3 May 1967	TR1454258112; 51°16′54″N 1°04′30″E		1260296	89 and 90, St Dunstan's Street More images	Q26551328
91 and 92, St Dunstan's Street	II	91 and 92, St Dunstan's Street			7 September 1973	TR1454958107; 51°16′54″N 1°04′30″E		1241915	91 and 92, St Dunstan's Street More images	Q26534756
93, St Dunstan's Street	II	93, St Dunstan's Street			3 December 1949	TR1455658103; 51°16′54″N 1°04′31″E		1241976	93, St Dunstan's Street More images	Q26534815
94, St Dunstan's Street	II	94, St Dunstan's Street			7 September 1973	TR1456358101; 51°16′54″N 1°04′31″E		1241916	94, St Dunstan's Street More images	Q26534757
95, St Dunstan's Street	II	95, St Dunstan's Street			7 September 1973	TR1456558099; 51°16′54″N 1°04′31″E		1260255	95, St Dunstan's Street More images	Q26551293

=== St Dunstan's Terrace ===
Name	Grade	Location	Type	Completed	Date designated	Grid ref. Geo-coordinates	Notes	Entry number	Image	Wikidata
2-20, St Dunstan's Terrace	II	2-20, St Dunstan's Terrace			3 May 1967	TR1421258141; 51°16′56″N 1°04′13″E		1260297	Upload Photo	Q26551329
22-28, St Dunstan's Terrace	II	22-28, St Dunstan's Terrace			7 September 1973	TR1418558166; 51°16′56″N 1°04′12″E		1260256	Upload Photo	Q26551294

=== St Stephen's Green ===
Name	Grade	Location	Type	Completed	Date designated	Grid ref. Geo-coordinates	Notes	Entry number	Image	Wikidata
K6 Telephone Kiosk	II	St Stephen's Green			13 July 1990	TR1468959098; 51°17′26″N 1°04′40″E		1241638	Upload Photo	Q26534502
Old St Stephen's School	II	St Stephen's Green			7 September 1973	TR1464659129; 51°17′27″N 1°04′38″E		1039135	Upload Photo	Q26290922
Ye Olde Beverlie Inn	II	St Stephen's Green			3 December 1949	TR1468259126; 51°17′27″N 1°04′39″E		1065785	Upload Photo	Q26318820
Glebe Cottage	II	1-3, St Stephen's Green			3 December 1949	TR1470059052; 51°17′24″N 1°04′40″E		1357526	Upload Photo	Q26640038
Manwood's Hospital	II*	1-6, Stephen's Green			3 December 1949	TR1470059134; 51°17′27″N 1°04′40″E		1374126	Upload Photo	Q17557296
18 and 20, St Stephen's Green	II	18 and 20, St Stephen's Green			7 September 1973	TR1489258457; 51°17′05″N 1°04′49″E		1374139	Upload Photo	Q26655039
68C, St Stephen's Green, 65B St Stephen's Green, 68A St Stephen's Green, 68 St Stephen's Green, 70 St Stephen's Green	II	68C, St Stephen's Green, 65B St Stephen's Green, 68A St Stephen's Green, 68 St Stephen's Green, 70 St Stephen's Green			3 December 1949	TR1495358607; 51°17′10″N 1°04′52″E		1259921	Upload Photo	Q26550996

=== St Stephen's Road ===
Name	Grade	Location	Type	Completed	Date designated	Grid ref. Geo-coordinates	Notes	Entry number	Image	Wikidata
The Glebe House	II	St Stephen's Road			3 December 1949	TR1475659051; 51°17′24″N 1°04′43″E		1242635	Upload Photo	Q26535404
The Manor House	II	101, St Stephen's Road			3 December 1949	TR1477558979; 51°17′22″N 1°04′44″E		1259924	Upload Photo	Q26550999
Harflete	II	103, St Stephen's Road			3 May 1967	TR1476358991; 51°17′22″N 1°04′43″E		1039165	Upload Photo	Q26290953
The Old Vicarage Hackington	II	99, St Stephen's Road			7 September 1973	TR1480458962; 51°17′21″N 1°04′45″E		1039164	Upload Photo	Q26290951

=== St Thomas's Hill ===
Name	Grade	Location	Type	Completed	Date designated	Grid ref. Geo-coordinates	Notes	Entry number	Image	Wikidata
Beverley Farmhouse	II	St Thomas's Hill			3 December 1949	TR1381959320; 51°17′34″N 1°03′55″E		1259931	Upload Photo	Q26551004
Former Headmaster's House, St Edmund's School	II	St Thomas's Hill			7 September 1973	TR1338659209; 51°17′31″N 1°03′33″E		1242648	Upload Photo	Q26535413
St Edmund's School	II	St Thomas's Hill			7 September 1973	TR1341059177; 51°17′30″N 1°03′34″E		1242647	Upload Photo	Q26535412

=== Station Road West ===
Name	Grade	Location	Type	Completed	Date designated	Grid ref. Geo-coordinates	Notes	Entry number	Image	Wikidata
Canterbury West Station	II	Station Road West			7 September 1973	TR1456158383; 51°17′03″N 1°04′32″E		1242649	Upload Photo	Q671106
Goods Shed at Canterbury West Railway Station	II	Station Road West			5 March 1986	TR1462158442; 51°17′05″N 1°04′35″E		1258199	Upload Photo	Q26549468
Overhead Signal Box	II	Station Road West			10 March 1986	TR1463558509; 51°17′07″N 1°04′36″E		1258154	Upload Photo	Q26549428

=== Tenderden Drive ===
Name	Grade	Location	Type	Completed	Date designated	Grid ref. Geo-coordinates	Notes	Entry number	Image	Wikidata
Hales Place Jesuit Cemetery Chapel	II	Tenderden Drive			18 August 1976	TR1502759693; 51°17′45″N 1°04′58″E		1273523	Upload Photo	Q26563260

=== Tyler Hill ===
Name	Grade	Location	Type	Completed	Date designated	Grid ref. Geo-coordinates	Notes	Entry number	Image	Wikidata
Tyler Hill Railway Tunnel, Including North and South Portals, Under Tyler Hill (Former Canterbury and Whitstable Railway)	II*	Tyler Hill			24 December 2007	TR1415659825; 51°17′50″N 1°04′14″E		1392354	Upload Photo	Q17557301

=== Westgate Court Avenue ===
Name	Grade	Location	Type	Completed	Date designated	Grid ref. Geo-coordinates	Notes	Entry number	Image	Wikidata
Canterbury City Cemetery Joseph Conrad Memorial	II	Westgate Court Avenue			29 January 1996	TR1376358542; 51°17′09″N 1°03′51″E		1271538	Upload Photo	Q26561480

=== Westgate Grove ===
Name	Grade	Location	Type	Completed	Date designated	Grid ref. Geo-coordinates	Notes	Entry number	Image	Wikidata
1, Westgate Grove	II	1, Westgate Grove			3 May 1967	TR1453158056; 51°16′52″N 1°04′29″E		1242793	1, Westgate Grove More images	Q26535532
Piers of Bridge in Grounds of No 1	II	1, Westgate Grove			7 September 1973	TR1453658055; 51°16′52″N 1°04′30″E		1242871	Upload Photo	Q26535596
2, Westgate Grove	II	2, Westgate Grove			3 May 1967	TR1455858094; 51°16′54″N 1°04′31″E		1242872	2, Westgate Grove More images	Q26535597
4, Westgate Grove, 6 Westgate Grove	II	4, Westgate Grove, 6 Westgate Grove			3 December 1949	TR1455358090; 51°16′54″N 1°04′30″E		1242873	4, Westgate Grove, 6 Westgate Grove More images	Q26535598
Tavern Cottage	II	8, Westgate Grove			3 December 1949	TR1454858086; 51°16′53″N 1°04′30″E		1242874	Tavern Cottage More images	Q26535599
Stour Cottage	II	10, Westgate Grove			3 December 1949	TR1454358083; 51°16′53″N 1°04′30″E		1242909	Stour Cottage More images	Q26535630
12, Westgate Grove	II	12, Westgate Grove			3 May 1967	TR1453958080; 51°16′53″N 1°04′30″E		1242875	12, Westgate Grove More images	Q26535600
14, Westgate Grove	II	14, Westgate Grove			7 September 1973	TR1453258073; 51°16′53″N 1°04′29″E		1259807	14, Westgate Grove More images	Q26550894

=== West Place ===
Name	Grade	Location	Type	Completed	Date designated	Grid ref. Geo-coordinates	Notes	Entry number	Image	Wikidata
3, West Place	II	3, West Place			16 August 1989	TR1427758357; 51°17′03″N 1°04′17″E		1258440	Upload Photo	Q26549674
4, West Place	II	4, West Place			16 August 1989	TR1428058360; 51°17′03″N 1°04′17″E		1258441	Upload Photo	Q26549675
5, West Place	II	5, West Place			16 August 1989	TR1428558366; 51°17′03″N 1°04′17″E		1258442	Upload Photo	Q26549676

=== Whitstable Road ===
Name	Grade	Location	Type	Completed	Date designated	Grid ref. Geo-coordinates	Notes	Entry number	Image	Wikidata
Barn Adjoining Hothe Court on the North	II	Whitstable Road			14 March 1980	TR1306659731; 51°17′49″N 1°03′17″E		1085524	Upload Photo	Q26372984
Hothe Court	II	Whitstable Road			14 March 1980	TR1306759654; 51°17′46″N 1°03′17″E		1336585	Upload Photo	Q26621067
1 and 3, Whitstable Road	II	1 and 3, Whitstable Road			3 December 1949	TR1422358361; 51°17′03″N 1°04′14″E		1259809	Upload Photo	Q26550896
12, Whitstable Road	II	12, Whitstable Road			7 September 1973	TR1421958395; 51°17′04″N 1°04′14″E		1259799	Upload Photo	Q26550887
14 and 16, Whitstable Road	II	14 and 16, Whitstable Road			7 September 1973	TR1421058399; 51°17′04″N 1°04′13″E		1259825	Upload Photo	Q26550909
18 and 20, Whitstable Road	II	18 and 20, Whitstable Road			7 September 1973	TR1420358406; 51°17′04″N 1°04′13″E		1242961	Upload Photo	Q26535679
22, Whitstable Road	II	22, Whitstable Road			7 September 1973	TR1419758413; 51°17′04″N 1°04′13″E		1242879	Upload Photo	Q26535604
24, Whitstable Road	II	24, Whitstable Road			7 September 1973	TR1419158419; 51°17′05″N 1°04′13″E		1259800	Upload Photo	Q26550888
2-8, Whitstable Road	II	2-8, Whitstable Road			3 May 1967	TR1423558372; 51°17′03″N 1°04′15″E		1242878	Upload Photo	Q26535603
Holly Tree Cottage	II	34, Whitstable Road			7 September 1973	TR1416158450; 51°17′06″N 1°04′11″E		1242880	Upload Photo	Q26535605
7-11, Whitstable Road	II	7-11, Whitstable Road			7 September 1973	TR1420858379; 51°17′03″N 1°04′13″E		1242877	Upload Photo	Q26535602
Walnut Cottage Walnut Lodge	II	84, Whitstable Road			7 September 1973	TR1403258596; 51°17′11″N 1°04′05″E		1259826	Upload Photo	Q26550910

== See also ==
- Grade I listed buildings in Kent
- Grade II* listed buildings in Kent

== Sources ==
- Newman, John (2013) [1969], Kent: North-East and East, The Buildings of England, New Haven and London: Yale University Press, ISBN 978-0-300-18506-5
