= Holywood, County Down =

Town on outskirts of Belfast, Northern Ireland

Coordinates: 54.636°N 5.845°W

Holywood: Irish: Ard Mhic Nasca; Scots: Halywid
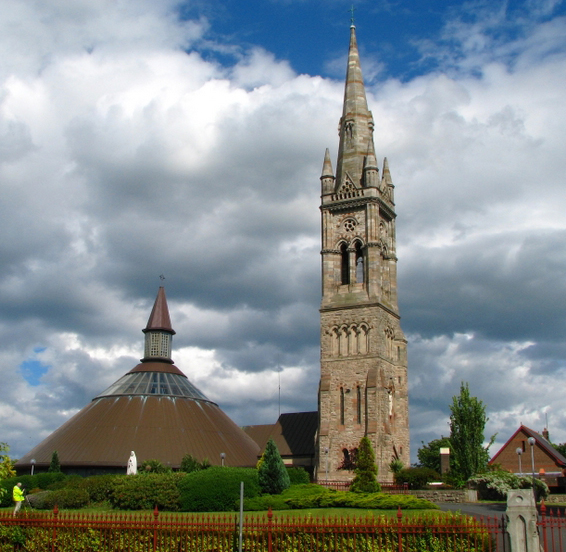
- St Colmcille's church on High Street

- Location within County Down
- Population: 10,757 (2021 census)
- District: Ards and North Down
- County: County Down
- Country: Northern Ireland
- Sovereign state: United Kingdom
- Post town: HOLYWOOD
- Postcode district: BT18
- Dialling code: 028
- Police: Northern Ireland
- Fire: Northern Ireland
- Ambulance: Northern Ireland
- UK Parliament: North Down
- NI Assembly: North Down

Holywood (/ˈhɒliwʊd/ HOL-ee-wuud; from Latin Sanctus Boscus 'holy wood') is a town in the metropolitan area of Belfast in County Down, Northern Ireland. It is a civil parish and townland of 306 hectares (755 acres) lying on the shore of Belfast Lough, between Belfast and Bangor. Holywood Exchange and Belfast City Airport are nearby.

== Toponymy ==
The English name Holywood comes from Latin Sanctus Boscus 'holy wood'. This was the name the Normans gave to the woodland surrounding the monastery of St Laiseran, son of Nasca. The monastery was founded by Laiseran before 640 and was on the site of the present Holywood Priory. The earliest Anglicised form appears as Haliwode in a 14th-century document.

The Irish name for Holywood is Ard Mhic Nasca meaning "high ground of Mac Nasca".

== History ==
In the early 19th century, Holywood, like many other coastal villages throughout Ireland, became popular as a resort for sea-bathing. Many wealthy Belfast merchants chose the town and the surrounding area to build large homes for themselves. These included the Kennedys of Cultra and the Harrisons of Holywood. Dalchoolin House stood on the site of the present Ulster Transport Museum, while Cultra Manor was built between 1902–04 and now houses the Ulster Folk Museum.

The railway line from Belfast to Holywood opened in 1848, and this led to rapid development. The population of Holywood was approximately 3,500 in 1900 and had grown to 12,000 by 2001. This growth, coupled with that of other towns and villages along the coastal strip to Bangor, necessitated the construction of the Holywood Bypass which was completed in 1972.

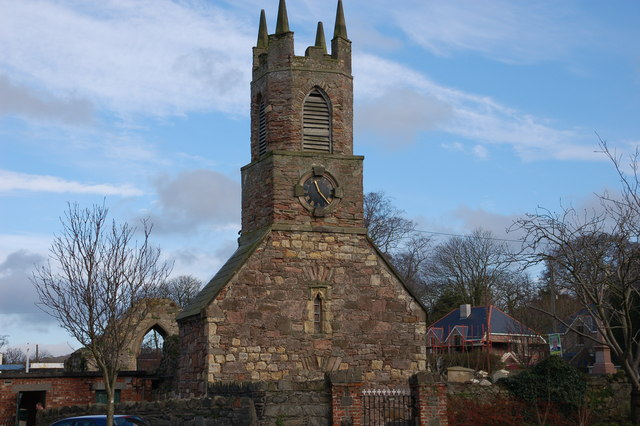
Holywood Priory

The Old Priory ruins lie at the bottom of the High Street. The tower dates from 1800, but the oldest ruins date from the early 13th century. The Priory graveyard is the resting place for many distinguished citizens including the educational reformer, Robert Sullivan, and the Praeger family. Sullivan Upper Grammar School is named after Robert Sullivan. Robert Lloyd Praeger (1865–1953) was an internationally renowned botanist and his sister, Rosamond Praeger (1867–1954), gained fame as a sculptor and writer.

On 17 June 1994, Garnet Bell, a former pupil bearing a grudge, entered an assembly hall at Sullivan Upper School and used a flamethrower to attack students taking A-level examinations. Six pupils were injured; three of them seriously.

On 12 April 2010, at around 12:24am, a car bombing occurred near Palace Barracks, a British Army barracks on the edge of Holywood's town centre. An elderly man was blown off his feet and had to be treated in hospital. The bomb was allegedly driven towards the base in a hijacked taxi. The Real IRA claimed responsibility for the attack.

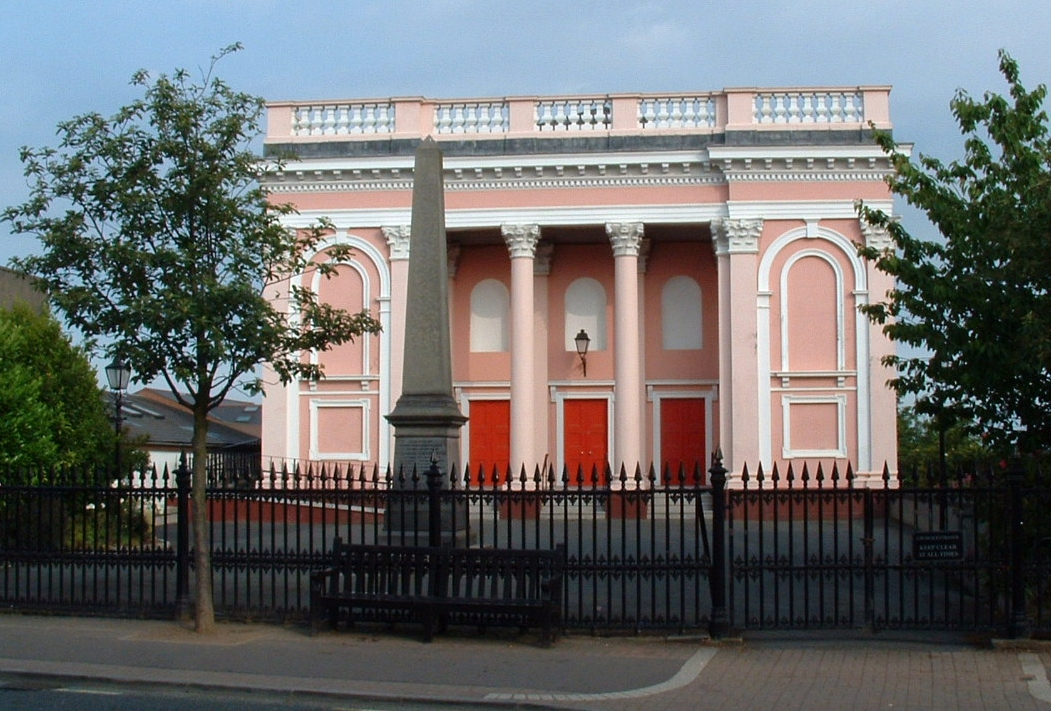
First Presbyterian Non-Subscribing Church, Holywood

== Demography ==
=== 2021 Census ===
As of the 2021 United Kingdom census on 21 March, there were 10,757 people living in Holywood. Of these:

- 55.33% (5,952) belong to or were brought up in 'Protestant and Other Christian (including Christian related)' denominations, 25.77% (2,772) belong to or were brought up in the Catholic Christian faith, 2.16% (232) belong to or were brought up in Other religions, and 16.74% (1,801) were of no religious background
- 53.30% (5,734) indicated that they had a British national identity, 20.18% (2,171) had an Irish national identity and 40.64% (4,372) had a Northern Irish national identity (respondents could indicate more than one national identity)
- 6.40% (688) had some knowledge of Irish (Gaelic) and 7.38% (794) had some knowledge of Ulster-Scots

=== 2011 Census ===
As of the 2011 United Kingdom census on 27 March, there were 11,257 people living in Holywood. Of these:

- 18.29% were under 16 years of age and 18.79% were 65 or older
- 48.99% were male and 51.01% were female
- 62.25% were from a Protestant or other Christian background and 23.11% were from a Catholic Christian background.
- 3.39% of people aged 16–74 were unemployed.

== Places of interest ==
- Holywood Priory

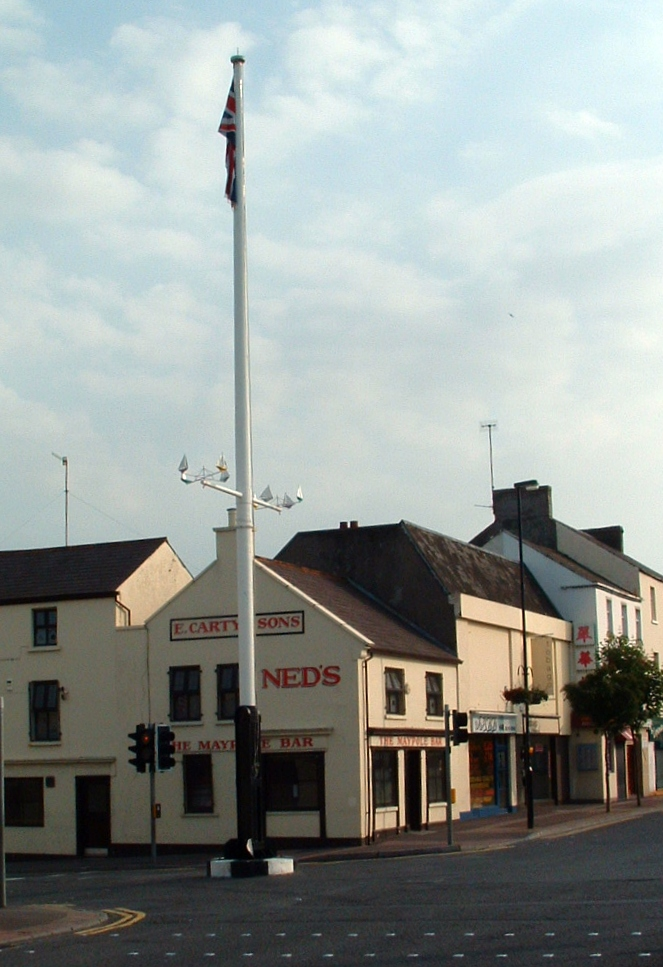
The Maypole and Ned's Bar

- Holywood is known for its maypole at the crossroads in the centre of town. Its origin is uncertain, but, according to local folklore, it dates from 1700, when a Dutch ship is said to have run aground on the shore nearby, and the crew erected the broken mast to show their appreciation of the assistance offered to them by the townsfolk. It was the only surviving original maypole in Ireland, but was severely damaged in high winds in February 2021 and had to be replaced.
- The nearby Maypole Bar is known locally as Ned's.
- There is a Norman motte in the town which may have been constructed on an earlier burial mound.
- The Ulster Folk and Transport Museum illustrating the way of life and traditions of the people of Ulster is nearby, at Cultra.

== Transport ==
On 2 August 1848, the first leg of the Belfast and County Down Railway, or BCDR, was opened from Belfast to Holywood. The Holywood railway station opened simultaneously. The railway line was extended via the Belfast, Holywood and Bangor Railway (BHBR) to Bangor, and the extension opened on 1 May 1865. The BCDR acquired the BHBR in 1884. Holywood station was closed for goods traffic on 24 April 1950.

== Wildlife ==
Records of the marine algae include: Polysiphonia elongata, Laurencia obtusa, Chondria dasyphylla, Pterothamnion plumula, Rhodophyllis divaricate, and Coccotylus truncates.

== Industry ==
The Crosslé Car Company, a manufacturer of racing cars is based in Holywood.

== Education ==
The town contains the following schools: Holywood Primary School, Holywood Nursery School, Holywood Rudolf Steiner School, Priory Integrated College, Rockport School, St. Patrick's Primary School, and Sullivan Preparatory School and Sullivan Upper School.

== Sport ==
Holywood is home to Formula One driver, Eddie Irvine and Formula 3 Driver (2020), Christian Lester.

=== Cricket ===
Holywood Cricket Club was formed at Kinnegar in 1881. It moved to Belfast Road in 1885 and then to the present ground at Seapark Road in 1996.

=== Football ===
Holywood F.C. is a Northern Irish intermediate football club playing in Division 1B of the Northern Amateur Football League.

=== GAA ===
St. Paul's Gaelic Football Club was founded in 1979 as an amalgamation of the Holywood, Bangor, and Newtownards clubs.

=== Golf ===
Holywood Golf Club, founded in 1904, is where six-time major championship winner, Rory McIlroy, learned to play golf and continues to regard it as his home course. Nearby Craigavad is the home of the Royal Belfast Golf Club, the oldest in Ireland, dating from 1881. The club's present course was designed by architect Harry Colt in 1926.

== Notable people ==
- Mark Adair, former cricketer for Warwickshire County Cricket Club; former Sullivan Upper School pupil
- Desmond Boal, QC, leading Northern Ireland barrister and former Stormont MP, resided in Holywood
- Charles Brett, architectural historian, born in Holywood
- Fr. Stephen Brown, SJ, writer, librarian, founder of the Central Catholic Library (in Dublin), was born in Holywood
- Barbara Callcott, Australian television personality, born in Holywood
- Darren Cave, played rugby for Ulster Rugby and helped Ireland Under-20 win the Six Nations Grand Slam in 2007
- Robert Cunningham (died 1637) first Presbyterian minister
- James Stevens Curl, architectural historian
- Jamie Dornan, actor, model
- Hubert Dunn, judge and author of a book on Francis Ledwidge
- Garth Ennis, comic writer
- Henry Harrison, MP, secretary to Charles Stewart Parnell, is buried in the Priory graveyard in the centre of Holywood
- Maurice Jay, U105 radio station presenter
- Bap Kennedy, singer-songwriter and record producer
- Tom Kerr, comic strip artist
- Stephen Martin, Great Britain and Ireland field hockey international
- Robert McCartney, QC, leading barrister and ex-UK Unionist Westminster MP for North Down (1995–2001); resides in Holywood.
- Alban Maginness, lawyer and Social Democratic and Labour Party (SDLP) politician; born in Holywood.
- Rory McIlroy, professional golfer, winner of six major championships
- Margaret Mountford, lawyer, businesswoman and advisor to Alan Sugar.
- Dermot Murnaghan is a television news anchorman whose family moved to Holywood where he lived just off Church View and attended Sullivan Upper School.
- Rachel O'Reilly, chemist and Fellow of the Royal Society of Chemistry; born and educated in Holywood.
- Rosamond Praeger, artist, sculptor and writer; younger sister of the naturalist Robert Lloyd Praeger
- Davy Sims broadcaster and writer, former head of BBC Northern Ireland New Media; born and raised in Holywood
- Michael Smiley, comedian, writer and actor
- Clive Standen, an actor, born in Holywood
- John St. Clair Boyd, born in Holywood
- Shane Todd, comedian, writer and actor.
- Peter Woodman, archaeologist, brought up in Holywood

== See also ==
- List of localities in Northern Ireland by population
- List of civil parishes of County Down
