= Listed buildings in Canterbury (outside city walls, south) =

Civil Parish in Kent, England

Canterbury is a city in Kent, England. The non-civil parish contains 1068 listed buildings that are recorded in the National Heritage List for England for Canterbury, Whitstable and Herne Bay. Of these 35 are grade I, 50 are grade II* and 983 are grade II.

This list covers the area in Canterbury outside the city walls south of the river Great Stour. It is based on the information retrieved online from Historic England.

Further lists of listed buildings in Canterbury can be found here:

- City of Canterbury within the city walls, eastern part
- City of Canterbury within the city walls, western part
- City of Canterbury within the city walls, north of the river Great Stour
- City of Canterbury outside the city walls, north of the river Great Stour
- Herne Bay and Whitstable

== Key ==
Grade	Criteria
I	Buildings that are of exceptional interest
II*	Particularly important buildings of more than special interest
II	Buildings that are of special interest

== Listing ==
=== Albion Place ===
Name	Grade	Location	Type	Completed (Note: The date given is the date used by Historic England as significant for the initial building or that of an important part in the structure's description.)	Date designated	Grid ref. (Note: The grid reference is based on the British national grid reference system, sometimes known as OSGB36, used by the Ordnance Survey.) Geo-coordinates	Notes	Entry number (Note: The "List Entry Number" is a unique number assigned to each listed building and scheduled monument by Historic England.)	Image	Wikidata
1, Albion Place	II	1, Albion Place			7 September 1973	TR1524658106; 51°16′53″N 1°05′06″E		1248633	1, Albion Place More images	Q26540829

=== Barton Mill Road ===
Name	Grade	Location	Type	Completed	Date designated	Grid ref. Geo-coordinates	Notes	Entry number	Image	Wikidata
Lesser Knowlesthorpe	II	Barton Mill Road			3 May 1967	TR1566358798; 51°17′15″N 1°05′29″E		1248636	Upload Photo	Q26540832
Watermill	II	Barton Mill Road			7 September 1973	TR1558958834; 51°17′16″N 1°05′25″E		1085164	Upload Photo	Q26371079
3 and 4, Barton Mill Road	II	3 and 4, Barton Mill Road			7 September 1973	TR1560158801; 51°17′15″N 1°05′26″E		1336753	Upload Photo	Q26621229

=== Bekesbourne Lane ===
Name	Grade	Location	Type	Completed	Date designated	Grid ref. Geo-coordinates	Notes	Entry number	Image	Wikidata
Highlands	II	Bekesbourne Lane			7 September 1973	TR1758257293; 51°16′24″N 1°07′05″E		1248680	Upload Photo	Q26540877
Orchard House	II	Bekesbourne Lane			3 December 1949	TR1759757221; 51°16′21″N 1°07′05″E		1336755	Upload Photo	Q26621232
The Manor House	II	Bekesbourne Lane			3 December 1949	TR1754957249; 51°16′22″N 1°07′03″E		1248676	Upload Photo	Q26540873

=== Broad Street ===
Name	Grade	Location	Type	Completed	Date designated	Grid ref. Geo-coordinates	Notes	Entry number	Image	Wikidata
Diocesan and Payne Smith Church of England Primary School, including attached boundary wall and school house	II	Broad Street			5 March 2008	TR1524758077; 51°16′52″N 1°05′06″E		1392460	Diocesan and Payne Smith Church of England Primary School, including attached boundary wall and school house More images	Q26671677
The Brewer's Delight Inn	II	Broad Street			7 September 1973	TR1533057951; 51°16′48″N 1°05′10″E		1085142	The Brewer's Delight Inn More images	Q26370955
Cromwell House	II	8, Broad Street			7 September 1973	TR1528457784; 51°16′43″N 1°05′07″E		1085141	Cromwell House More images	Q26370951
9 and 10, Broad Street	II	9 and 10, Broad Street			7 September 1973	TR1528757792; 51°16′43″N 1°05′08″E		1248782	9 and 10, Broad Street More images	Q26540971
34-36, Broad Street	II	34-36, Broad Street			7 September 1973	TR1532857959; 51°16′48″N 1°05′10″E		1336782	34-36, Broad Street More images	Q26621257
37, Broad Street	II	37, Broad Street			7 September 1973	TR1532557970; 51°16′49″N 1°05′10″E		1249342	37, Broad Street More images	Q26541485
37A and 38, Broad Street	II	37A and 38, Broad Street			3 May 1967	TR1532157985; 51°16′49″N 1°05′10″E		1085143	37A and 38, Broad Street More images	Q26370963
39 and 40, Broad Street	II	39 and 40, Broad Street			7 September 1973	TR1531657993; 51°16′49″N 1°05′10″E		1249758	39 and 40, Broad Street More images	Q26541862
41 and 42, Broad Street	II	41 and 42, Broad Street			7 September 1973	TR1531358003; 51°16′50″N 1°05′09″E		1336783	41 and 42, Broad Street More images	Q26621259
Broad Street House	II	42A, Broad Street			3 May 1967	TR1530658011; 51°16′50″N 1°05′09″E		1085144	Broad Street House More images	Q26370968
46, Broad Street	II	46, Broad Street			7 September 1973	TR1529858053; 51°16′51″N 1°05′09″E		1249761	46, Broad Street More images	Q26541865
47 and 47A Broad Street, formerly No 1	II	47 and 47A, Broad Street			7 September 1973	TR1526358087; 51°16′52″N 1°05′07″E		1336784	47 and 47A Broad Street, formerly No 1 More images	Q26621260
48, Broad Street	II	48, Broad Street			7 September 1973	TR1525858092; 51°16′53″N 1°05′07″E		1249764	48, Broad Street More images	Q26541867
49, Broad Street, 15 Albion Place	II	49, Broad Street, 15 Albion Place			7 September 1973	TR1525358098; 51°16′53″N 1°05′07″E		1085145	49, Broad Street, 15 Albion Place More images	Q26370973
50, Broad Street	II	50, Broad Street			7 September 1973	TR1524058110; 51°16′53″N 1°05′06″E		1085146	50, Broad Street More images	Q26370978
51 and 52, Broad Street	II	51 and 52, Broad Street			7 September 1973	TR1523658114; 51°16′53″N 1°05′06″E		1249766	51 and 52, Broad Street More images	Q26541869
St Crispin's	II	57, Broad Street			3 May 1967	TR1522058131; 51°16′54″N 1°05′05″E		1336785	St Crispin's More images	Q26621261
66-69, Broad Street	II	66-69, Broad Street			7 September 1973	TR1519058161; 51°16′55″N 1°05′03″E		1085147	66-69, Broad Street More images	Q26370985
70, Broad Street	II	70, Broad Street			3 May 1967	TR1517858174; 51°16′55″N 1°05′03″E		1263578	70, Broad Street More images	Q26554357
71, Broad Street	II	71, Broad Street			3 May 1967	TR1517258179; 51°16′56″N 1°05′03″E		1336786	71, Broad Street More images	Q26621262
72-74, Broad Street	II	72-74, Broad Street			3 May 1967	TR1516558185; 51°16′56″N 1°05′02″E		1249772	72-74, Broad Street More images	Q26541874
75 and 76, Broad Street	II	75 and 76, Broad Street			7 September 1973	TR1515958192; 51°16′56″N 1°05′02″E		1085148	75 and 76, Broad Street More images	Q26370990
77, Broad Street	II	77, Broad Street			7 September 1973	TR1515458197; 51°16′56″N 1°05′02″E		1085149	77, Broad Street More images	Q26370995
78 and 79, Broad Street	II	78 and 79, Broad Street			7 September 1973	TR1514958202; 51°16′56″N 1°05′01″E		1336805	78 and 79, Broad Street More images	Q26621280
80, Broad Street	II	80, Broad Street			3 May 1967	TR1513958183; 51°16′56″N 1°05′01″E		1085104	80, Broad Street More images	Q26370755
81, Broad Street	II	81, Broad Street			3 May 1967	TR1514358180; 51°16′56″N 1°05′01″E		1085105	81, Broad Street More images	Q26370759
82, Broad Street	II	82, Broad Street			7 September 1973	TR1514758175; 51°16′55″N 1°05′01″E		1336806	82, Broad Street More images	Q26621281
83, Broad Street	II	83, Broad Street			7 September 1973	TR1515058171; 51°16′55″N 1°05′01″E		1085106	83, Broad Street More images	Q26370766
84, Broad Street	II	84, Broad Street			7 September 1973	TR1515458167; 51°16′55″N 1°05′02″E		1336807	84, Broad Street More images	Q26621282
85 and 86, Broad Street	II	85 and 86, Broad Street			7 September 1973	TR1516058162; 51°16′55″N 1°05′02″E		1085107	85 and 86, Broad Street More images	Q26370771
87, Broad Street	II	87, Broad Street			7 September 1973	TR1516558157; 51°16′55″N 1°05′02″E		1336808	87, Broad Street More images	Q26621283
88, Broad Street	II	88, Broad Street			7 September 1973	TR1517758141; 51°16′54″N 1°05′03″E		1085108	88, Broad Street More images	Q26370777
89, Broad Street	II	89, Broad Street			7 September 1973	TR1518558134; 51°16′54″N 1°05′03″E		1085109	89, Broad Street More images	Q26370782
Messrs Cozens (Adjoining No 93 to the Right)	II	Broad Street			7 September 1973	TR1529057991; 51°16′49″N 1°05′08″E		1085110	Upload Photo	Q26370787

=== Central Parade ===
Name	Grade	Location	Type	Completed	Date designated	Grid ref. Geo-coordinates	Notes	Entry number	Image	Wikidata
Kent and Canterbury Club	II	23, Central Parade			3 May 1967	TR1508457417; 51°16′31″N 1°04′56″E		1241195	Upload Photo	Q26534081

=== Church Street ===
Name	Grade	Location	Type	Completed	Date designated	Grid ref. Geo-coordinates	Notes	Entry number	Image	Wikidata
Church of St Paul Without the Walls	II*	Church Street			3 December 1949	TR1529357715; 51°16′40″N 1°05′08″E		1336814	Church of St Paul Without the Walls More images	Q17557265
The Duke's Head Inn	II	Church Street			3 May 1967	TR1528257740; 51°16′41″N 1°05′07″E		1336813	The Duke's Head Inn More images	Q26621287
9-11, Church Street	II	9-11, Church Street			7 September 1973	TR1532257733; 51°16′41″N 1°05′09″E		1085040	Upload Photo	Q26370460
13-15, Church Street	II	13-15, Church Street			3 December 1949	TR1532657712; 51°16′40″N 1°05′10″E		1085041	13-15, Church Street More images	Q26370465
18, Church Street, 16 and 17 Church Street	II	18, Church Street, 16 and 17 Church Street			3 May 1967	TR1526857723; 51°16′41″N 1°05′07″E		1085042	Upload Photo	Q26370471

=== Dover Road ===
Name	Grade	Location	Type	Completed	Date designated	Grid ref. Geo-coordinates	Notes	Entry number	Image	Wikidata
Milestone Farmhouse	II	Dover Road			14 March 1980	TR1704055710; 51°15′33″N 1°06′33″E		1085582	Upload Photo	Q26373292

=== Dover Street ===
Name	Grade	Location	Type	Completed	Date designated	Grid ref. Geo-coordinates	Notes	Entry number	Image	Wikidata
The Corner House	II	1, Dover Street			3 May 1967	TR1513757534; 51°16′35″N 1°04′59″E		1085048	Upload Photo	Q26370504
12-16, Dover Street	II	12-16, Dover Street			3 May 1967	TR1520457482; 51°16′33″N 1°05′03″E		1085049	Upload Photo	Q26370511
19, Dover Street	II	19, Dover Street			3 May 1967	TR1523057461; 51°16′32″N 1°05′04″E		1240552	Upload Photo	Q26533471
20, Dover Street	II	20, Dover Street			7 September 1973	TR1523957453; 51°16′32″N 1°05′04″E		1085050	Upload Photo	Q26370517
21-28, Dover Street	II	21-28, Dover Street			7 September 1973	TR1524257449; 51°16′32″N 1°05′05″E		1085051	Upload Photo	Q26370523
2-5, Dover Street	II	2-5, Dover Street			7 September 1973	TR1514657526; 51°16′34″N 1°05′00″E		1240500	Upload Photo	Q26533423
29 and 30, Dover Street	II	29 and 30, Dover Street			3 May 1967	TR1526657430; 51°16′31″N 1°05′06″E		1260961	Upload Photo	Q26551942
Forge Cottage	II	31, Dover Street			7 September 1973	TR1527257425; 51°16′31″N 1°05′06″E		1085052	Upload Photo	Q26370528
32 and 33, Dover Street	II	32 and 33, Dover Street			7 September 1973	TR1527757414; 51°16′31″N 1°05′06″E		1085053	Upload Photo	Q26370535
34-36, Dover Street	II	34-36, Dover Street			3 May 1967	TR1527457400; 51°16′30″N 1°05′06″E		1260964	Upload Photo	Q26551945
37-40, Dover Street	II	37-40, Dover Street			7 September 1973	TR1529757425; 51°16′31″N 1°05′07″E		1336817	Upload Photo	Q26621290
45 and 46, Dover Street	II	45 and 46, Dover Street			7 September 1973	TR1526457458; 51°16′32″N 1°05′06″E		1240562	Upload Photo	Q26533480
47 and 48, Dover Street	II	47 and 48, Dover Street			7 September 1973	TR1525657465; 51°16′32″N 1°05′05″E		1085054	Upload Photo	Q26370540
52, Dover Street	II	52, Dover Street			3 May 1967	TR1522157497; 51°16′33″N 1°05′04″E		1336818	Upload Photo	Q26621291

=== Duck Lane ===
Name	Grade	Location	Type	Completed	Date designated	Grid ref. Geo-coordinates	Notes	Entry number	Image	Wikidata
Orchard House	II	1, Duck Lane			7 September 1973	TR1503158266; 51°16′59″N 1°04′56″E		1240573	Upload Photo	Q26533491
The Little House	II	2, Duck Lane			7 September 1973	TR1504458258; 51°16′58″N 1°04′56″E		1085055	Upload Photo	Q26370546
2A, Duck Lane	II	2A, Duck Lane			7 September 1973	TR1504858254; 51°16′58″N 1°04′56″E		1085056	Upload Photo	Q26370552
3 and 4, Duck Lane	II	3 and 4, Duck Lane			7 September 1973	TR1505358251; 51°16′58″N 1°04′57″E		1240574	Upload Photo	Q26533492
5 and 6, Duck Lane	II	5 and 6, Duck Lane			7 September 1973	TR1505858247; 51°16′58″N 1°04′57″E		1336819	Upload Photo	Q26621292

=== Gordon Road ===
Name	Grade	Location	Type	Completed	Date designated	Grid ref. Geo-coordinates	Notes	Entry number	Image	Wikidata
Dane John Works	II	45, Gordon Road			8 May 1978	TR1479057185; 51°16′24″N 1°04′41″E		1273536	Upload Photo	Q26563271

=== Ivy Lane ===
Name	Grade	Location	Type	Completed	Date designated	Grid ref. Geo-coordinates	Notes	Entry number	Image	Wikidata
Carolean Cottage	II	7, Ivy Lane			7 September 1973	TR1528457630; 51°16′38″N 1°05′07″E		1260827	Carolean Cottage More images	Q26551820
8-12, Ivy Lane	II	8-12, Ivy Lane			7 September 1973	TR1529657628; 51°16′38″N 1°05′08″E		1240823	8-12, Ivy Lane More images	Q26533722
13, Ivy Lane	II	13, Ivy Lane			7 September 1973	TR1530957627; 51°16′38″N 1°05′08″E		1260828	13, Ivy Lane More images	Q26551821
40A and 41, Ivy Lane	II	40A and 41, Ivy Lane			3 December 1949	TR1540257595; 51°16′36″N 1°05′13″E		1240824	40A and 41, Ivy Lane More images	Q26533723
42-45, Ivy Lane	II*	42-45, Ivy Lane			3 December 1949	TR1538357600; 51°16′37″N 1°05′12″E		1260829	42-45, Ivy Lane More images	Q17557214
51 and 51A, Ivy Lane	II	51 and 51A, Ivy Lane			7 September 1973	TR1536557606; 51°16′37″N 1°05′11″E		1260800	51 and 51A, Ivy Lane More images	Q26551793
53-57, Ivy Lane	II	53-57, Ivy Lane			7 September 1973	TR1534857610; 51°16′37″N 1°05′10″E		1260830	53-57, Ivy Lane More images	Q26551822
The Sawyers Public House	II	58, Ivy Lane			7 September 1973	TR1532657612; 51°16′37″N 1°05′09″E		1260801	The Sawyers Public House More images	Q26551794
59A, Ivy Lane	II	59A, Ivy Lane			7 September 1973	TR1531657613; 51°16′37″N 1°05′09″E		1240859	59A, Ivy Lane More images	Q26533757
Micawber's	II	60, Ivy Lane			7 September 1973	TR1529557612; 51°16′37″N 1°05′08″E		1260806	Upload Photo	Q26551799
No 63 (The Chaucer Hotel) North Side Only the Chaucer Hotel	II	63, Ivy Lane			7 September 1973	TR1528257614; 51°16′37″N 1°05′07″E		1240860	Upload Photo	Q26533758

=== Lady Wooton's Green ===
Name	Grade	Location	Type	Completed	Date designated	Grid ref. Geo-coordinates	Notes	Entry number	Image	Wikidata
1, Lady Wooton's Green	II	1, Lady Wooton's Green			3 December 1949	TR1534457879; 51°16′46″N 1°05′11″E		1240922	1, Lady Wooton's Green More images	Q26533818

=== Lansdown Road ===
Name	Grade	Location	Type	Completed	Date designated	Grid ref. Geo-coordinates	Notes	Entry number	Image	Wikidata
62-64, Lansdown Road	II	62-64, Lansdown Road			7 September 1973	TR1513857269; 51°16′26″N 1°04′59″E		1260761	Upload Photo	Q26551755

=== Littlebourne Road ===
Name	Grade	Location	Type	Completed	Date designated	Grid ref. Geo-coordinates	Notes	Entry number	Image	Wikidata
Gatepiers and Remains of A Wall	II	Littlebourne Road			7 September 1973	TR1792157889; 51°16′42″N 1°07′24″E		1079085	Upload Photo	Q26350697

=== Longport ===
Name	Grade	Location	Type	Completed	Date designated	Grid ref. Geo-coordinates	Notes	Entry number	Image	Wikidata
East Kent Sessions House	II	Longport			3 May 1967	TR1566757723; 51°16′40″N 1°05′27″E		1334320	Upload Photo	Q26618995
Entrance Lodge, Octagonal Perimeter Wall, Octagon and A, B and C Wings, former Her Majesty's Prison Canterbury	II	Longport			7 September 1973	TR1573757741; 51°16′41″N 1°05′31″E		1096982	Upload Photo	Q26389237
Gatepier and Wall to north side of Longport and west side of North Holmes Road, former Her Majesty's Prison Canterbury	II	Longport			21 February 2014	TR1578357723; 51°16′40″N 1°05′33″E		1417515	Upload Photo	Q26676586
K6 Telephone Kiosk	II	Longport			11 May 2007	TR1543757663; 51°16′38″N 1°05′15″E		1391957	Upload Photo	Q26688451
Wall and Railings to former Sessions House and Canterbury Prison	II	Longport			7 September 1973	TR1567657695; 51°16′39″N 1°05′28″E		1097022	Upload Photo	Q26389277
Wall to Left of East Kent Sessions House	II	Longport			7 September 1973	TR1562057723; 51°16′40″N 1°05′25″E		1097021	Upload Photo	Q26389276
Wall to Right of Hospital	II	Longport			7 September 1973	TR1553457673; 51°16′39″N 1°05′20″E		1334319	Upload Photo	Q26618994
Park Cottages	II	1 and 2, Longport			7 September 1973	TR1576257610; 51°16′36″N 1°05′32″E		1334302	Upload Photo	Q26618978
Longport House	II	1-3, Longport			3 December 1949	TR1533157700; 51°16′40″N 1°05′10″E		1241029	Longport House More images	Q26533923
6, Longport	II	6, Longport			7 September 1973	TR1533657680; 51°16′39″N 1°05′10″E		1260739	Upload Photo	Q26551734
6A, Longport	II	6A, Longport			3 May 1967	TR1535257671; 51°16′39″N 1°05′11″E		1097015	6A, Longport More images	Q26389269
7 and 8, Longport	II	7 and 8, Longport			3 December 1949	TR1536657670; 51°16′39″N 1°05′11″E		1334299	7 and 8, Longport More images	Q26618975
9, Longport	II	9, Longport			3 December 1949	TR1537657669; 51°16′39″N 1°05′12″E		1097016	9, Longport More images	Q26389270
13 and 14, Longport	II	13 and 14, Longport			7 September 1973	TR1540557665; 51°16′39″N 1°05′13″E		1334300	13 and 14, Longport More images	Q26618976
15-17, Longport	II	15-17, Longport			7 September 1973	TR1541757663; 51°16′39″N 1°05′14″E		1097017	Upload Photo	Q26389272
35, Longport	II	35, Longport			7 September 1973	TR1555857653; 51°16′38″N 1°05′21″E		1097018	Upload Photo	Q26389273
Barton Court	II	36, Longport			3 December 1949	TR1564057642; 51°16′38″N 1°05′26″E		1334301	Upload Photo	Q26618977
John Smith's Hospital	II	37-44, Longport			3 May 1967	TR1575657678; 51°16′39″N 1°05′32″E		1097019	Upload Photo	Q26389274

=== Love Lane ===
Name	Grade	Location	Type	Completed	Date designated	Grid ref. Geo-coordinates	Notes	Entry number	Image	Wikidata
5 and 6, Love Lane	II	5 and 6, Love Lane			7 September 1973	TR1533257644; 51°16′38″N 1°05′10″E		1097023	5 and 6, Love Lane More images	Q26389278
7-13, Love Lane	II	7-13, Love Lane			7 September 1973	TR1533457662; 51°16′39″N 1°05′10″E		1334322	7-13, Love Lane More images	Q26618997
14, Love Lane	II	14, Love Lane			7 September 1973	TR1534857660; 51°16′39″N 1°05′11″E		1097024	14, Love Lane More images	Q26389279
15 and 16, Love Lane	II	15 and 16, Love Lane			7 September 1973	TR1534757653; 51°16′38″N 1°05′10″E		1097025	15 and 16, Love Lane More images	Q26389280
17 and 18, Love Lane	II	17 and 18, Love Lane			7 September 1973	TR1534657644; 51°16′38″N 1°05′10″E		1096990	17 and 18, Love Lane More images	Q26389245

=== Lower Bridge Street ===
Name	Grade	Location	Type	Completed	Date designated	Grid ref. Geo-coordinates	Notes	Entry number	Image	Wikidata
18, Lower Bridge Street	II	18, Lower Bridge Street			7 September 1973	TR1522757650; 51°16′38″N 1°05′04″E		1097026	Upload Photo	Q26389281
24, Lower Bridge Street	II	24, Lower Bridge Street			3 May 1967	TR1525657725; 51°16′41″N 1°05′06″E		1334341	Upload Photo	Q26619014

=== Martyrs Field Road ===
Name	Grade	Location	Type	Completed	Date designated	Grid ref. Geo-coordinates	Notes	Entry number	Image	Wikidata
Monument to 41 Kentish Martyrs	II	Martyrs Field Road			7 September 1973	TR1461957102; 51°16′21″N 1°04′32″E		1334303	Upload Photo	Q26618979

=== Military Road ===
Name	Grade	Location	Type	Completed	Date designated	Grid ref. Geo-coordinates	Notes	Entry number	Image	Wikidata
Building Adjoining No 1 to the Left	II	Military Road			7 September 1973	TR1527258089; 51°16′52″N 1°05′08″E		1096957	Building Adjoining No 1 to the Left More images	Q26389214
Church of All Saints	II	Military Road			7 September 1973	TR1581058477; 51°17′04″N 1°05′36″E		1096958	Upload Photo	Q26389215
Wall and Gatepiers Surrounding Garrison Church of St Albans	II	Military Road			7 September 1973	TR1582658492; 51°17′05″N 1°05′37″E		1096959	Upload Photo	Q26389216
1, Military Road	II	1, Military Road			7 September 1973	TR1527858093; 51°16′53″N 1°05′08″E		1334309	1, Military Road More images	Q26618985
The Royal Dragoon Public House	II	100, Military Road			7 September 1973	TR1530458092; 51°16′53″N 1°05′09″E		1096960	The Royal Dragoon Public House More images	Q26389217

=== Monastery Street ===
Name	Grade	Location	Type	Completed	Date designated	Grid ref. Geo-coordinates	Notes	Entry number	Image	Wikidata
Chapel of St Pancras, Ruins Remains of St Augustine's Abbey	I	Monastery Street			3 December 1949	TR1549557755; 51°16′41″N 1°05′18″E		1096932	Chapel of St Pancras, Ruins Remains of St Augustine's Abbey More images	Q334303
The Great Gateway or Fyndon's Gateway at St Augustine's College	I	Monastery Street			3 December 1949	TR1538657845; 51°16′44″N 1°05′13″E		1096936	The Great Gateway or Fyndon's Gateway at St Augustine's College More images	Q17529564
The Cemetery Gateway at St Augustine's College	I	Monastery Street			3 December 1949	TR1536057716; 51°16′40″N 1°05′11″E		1096935	The Cemetery Gateway at St Augustine's College More images	Q17529561
Hall and Chapel of St Augustine's College	II	Monastery Street			7 September 1973	TR1539357812; 51°16′43″N 1°05′13″E		1096937	Hall and Chapel of St Augustine's College More images	Q26389196
St Augustine's College	II	Monastery Street			3 May 1967	TR1542657845; 51°16′44″N 1°05′15″E		1334337	Upload Photo	Q7592538
Wall in Front of St Augustine's College	II	Monastery Street			7 September 1973	TR1537157806; 51°16′43″N 1°05′12″E		1334336	Wall in Front of St Augustine's College More images	Q26619010
Coleridge House	II	Monastery Street			3 May 1967	TR1541457938; 51°16′47″N 1°05′15″E		1361321	Upload Photo	Q26643324
Ruins to East of Coleridge House	II	Monastery Street			7 September 1973	TR1544657960; 51°16′48″N 1°05′16″E		1096939	Upload Photo	Q26389198
Wall to South of Coleridge House	II	Monastery Street			7 September 1973	TR1538757886; 51°16′46″N 1°05′13″E		1096940	Wall to South of Coleridge House More images	Q26389199
Bailey House	II	1, Monastery Street			3 May 1967	TR1535857701; 51°16′40″N 1°05′11″E		1096933	Bailey House More images	Q26389194
Wall Adjoining Bailey House to Right	II	Monastery Street			7 September 1973	TR1540057690; 51°16′39″N 1°05′13″E		1334334	Wall Adjoining Bailey House to Right More images	Q26619008
2, Monastery Street	II	2, Monastery Street			3 May 1967	TR1535357730; 51°16′41″N 1°05′11″E		1096934	2, Monastery Street More images	Q26389195
4-18, Monastery Street	II	4-18, Monastery Street			7 September 1973	TR1535757748; 51°16′41″N 1°05′11″E		1334335	4-18, Monastery Street More images	Q26619009

=== New Dover Road ===
Name	Grade	Location	Type	Completed	Date designated	Grid ref. Geo-coordinates	Notes	Entry number	Image	Wikidata
Gate Public House	II	164, New Dover Road			7 September 1973	TR1658956004; 51°15′43″N 1°06′11″E		1241039	Upload Photo	Q26533933

=== Northgate ===
Name	Grade	Location	Type	Completed	Date designated	Grid ref. Geo-coordinates	Notes	Entry number	Image	Wikidata
Gatehouse to St John's Hospital	II*	Northgate			3 December 1949	TR1520958297; 51°16′59″N 1°05′05″E		1260716	Gatehouse to St John's Hospital More images	Q17557206
Chapel to St John's Hospital	II*	North Gate			3 December 1949	TR1519558337; 51°17′01″N 1°05′04″E		1241057	Upload Photo	Q17557108
Refectory Hall and Kitchen to St John's Hospital	II*	Northgate			3 December 1949	TR1515858333; 51°17′01″N 1°05′02″E		1260717	Refectory Hall and Kitchen to St John's Hospital More images	Q17557210
Section of Wall to Rear of Chapel	II	Northgate			7 September 1973	TR1520058367; 51°17′02″N 1°05′04″E		1241058	Upload Photo	Q26533951
St John's Hospital	II	1 and 2, Northgate			7 September 1973	TR1518858298; 51°16′59″N 1°05′04″E		1241059	Upload Photo	Q26533952
St John's Hospital	II	3, Northgate			7 September 1973	TR1517658308; 51°17′00″N 1°05′03″E		1260718	Upload Photo	Q26891817
St John's Hospital	II	4 and 5, Northgate			7 September 1973	TR1516458318; 51°17′00″N 1°05′02″E		1241060	Upload Photo	Q26680779
St John's Hospital	II	6, Northgate			7 September 1973	TR1518358350; 51°17′01″N 1°05′04″E		1260719	Upload Photo	Q66477487
St John's Hospital	II	7, Northgate			7 September 1973	TR1521058318; 51°17′00″N 1°05′05″E		1241061	Upload Photo	Q26890800
28 and 29, Northgate	II	28 and 29, Northgate			7 September 1973	TR1530258374; 51°17′02″N 1°05′10″E		1260708	28 and 29, Northgate More images	Q26551706
30, Northgate	II*	30, Northgate			3 May 1967	TR1529858369; 51°17′02″N 1°05′09″E		1096944	30, Northgate More images	Q17557082
31, Northgate	II	31, Northgate			7 September 1973	TR1529458365; 51°17′01″N 1°05′09″E		1334338	31, Northgate More images	Q26619011
32, Northgate	II	32, Northgate			7 September 1973	TR1528958360; 51°17′01″N 1°05′09″E		1241052	32, Northgate More images	Q26533946
33, Northgate	II	33, Northgate			7 September 1973	TR1528358355; 51°17′01″N 1°05′09″E		1096945	33, Northgate More images	Q26389203
34, Northgate	II	34, Northgate			7 September 1973	TR1528058354; 51°17′01″N 1°05′09″E		1260713	34, Northgate More images	Q26551711
35, Northgate	II	35, Northgate			7 September 1973	TR1527758351; 51°17′01″N 1°05′08″E		1334339	35, Northgate More images	Q26619012
36 and 37, Northgate	II	36 and 37, Northgate			7 September 1973	TR1527158346; 51°17′01″N 1°05′08″E		1241054	36 and 37, Northgate More images	Q26533948
46, Northgate	II	46, Northgate			7 September 1973	TR1523258314; 51°17′00″N 1°05′06″E		1260715	46, Northgate More images	Q26551713
47, Northgate	II	47, Northgate			7 September 1973	TR1522358308; 51°17′00″N 1°05′05″E		1241055	47, Northgate More images	Q26533949
House of the White Swan	II	48, Northgate			3 May 1967	TR1521358301; 51°16′59″N 1°05′05″E		1241056	House of the White Swan More images	Q26533950
58, Northgate, 11 St John's Place	II	58, Northgate, 11 St John's Place			7 September 1973	TR1517058264; 51°16′58″N 1°05′03″E		1241062	58, Northgate, 11 St John's Place More images	Q26533955
60 and 60A, Northgate	II	60 and 60A, Northgate			7 September 1973	TR1516458253; 51°16′58″N 1°05′02″E		1241063	60 and 60A, Northgate More images	Q26533956
61 and 61A, Northgate, 62 Northgate	II	61 and 61A, Northgate, 62 Northgate			7 September 1973	TR1515658244; 51°16′58″N 1°05′02″E		1241064	61 and 61A, Northgate, 62 Northgate More images	Q26533957
63-65, Northgate, 65A Northgate	II	63-65, Northgate, 65A Northgate			7 September 1973	TR1514858234; 51°16′57″N 1°05′01″E		1241065	63-65, Northgate, 65A Northgate More images	Q26533958
66 and 66A, Northgate	II	66 and 66A, Northgate			7 September 1973	TR1513858225; 51°16′57″N 1°05′01″E		1241108	66 and 66A, Northgate More images	Q26533997
67 and 68, Northgate	II	67 and 68, Northgate			7 September 1973	TR1513258219; 51°16′57″N 1°05′01″E		1241067	67 and 68, Northgate More images	Q26533961
69, Northgate	II	69, Northgate			7 September 1973	TR1512858215; 51°16′57″N 1°05′00″E		1241109	69, Northgate More images	Q26533998
70 and 71, Northgate	II	70 and 71, Northgate			7 September 1973	TR1512358210; 51°16′57″N 1°05′00″E		1241068	70 and 71, Northgate More images	Q26533962
72 and 74, Northgate	II	72 and 74, Northgate			7 September 1973	TR1510858195; 51°16′56″N 1°04′59″E		1260665	72 and 74, Northgate More images	Q26551664
76 and 77, Northgate	II	76 and 77, Northgate			7 September 1973	TR1514458209; 51°16′57″N 1°05′01″E		1260666	76 and 77, Northgate More images	Q26551665
78, Northgate	II	78, Northgate			7 September 1973	TR1515058213; 51°16′57″N 1°05′02″E		1241111	78, Northgate More images	Q26534000
79-82, Northgate	II	79-82, Northgate			3 May 1967	TR1515658218; 51°16′57″N 1°05′02″E		1241112	79-82, Northgate More images	Q26534001
83, Northgate	II	83, Northgate			7 September 1973	TR1517058234; 51°16′57″N 1°05′03″E		1260667	83, Northgate More images	Q26551666
84, Northgate	II	84, Northgate			7 September 1973	TR1517458238; 51°16′57″N 1°05′03″E		1241113	84, Northgate More images	Q26534002
85, Northgate	II	85, Northgate			7 September 1973	TR1518058244; 51°16′58″N 1°05′03″E		1260668	85, Northgate More images	Q26551667
86A and 86B, Northgate, 88A and 88B Northgate, 89 Northgate, 87 Northgate	II	86A and 86B, Northgate, 88A and 88B Northgate, 89 Northgate, 87 Northgate			7 September 1973	TR1519058254; 51°16′58″N 1°05′04″E		1241114	86A and 86B, Northgate, 88A and 88B Northgate, 89 Northgate, 87 Northgate More images	Q26534003
90 and 91, Northgate	II	90 and 91, Northgate			20 August 1970	TR1520358269; 51°16′58″N 1°05′04″E		1241115	90 and 91, Northgate More images	Q26534004
109-111, Northgate	II	109-111, Northgate			7 September 1973	TR1529158338; 51°17′01″N 1°05′09″E		1260669	109-111, Northgate More images	Q26551668
112, Northgate	II	112, Northgate			7 September 1973	TR1529858343; 51°17′01″N 1°05′09″E		1241128	112, Northgate More images	Q26534016
113 and 114, Northgate	II	113 and 114, Northgate			3 December 1949	TR1530258348; 51°17′01″N 1°05′10″E		1241116	113 and 114, Northgate More images	Q26534005
114A, Northgate	II	114A, Northgate			7 September 1973	TR1530858349; 51°17′01″N 1°05′10″E		1260676	114A, Northgate More images	Q26551674

=== Nunnery Fields ===
Name	Grade	Location	Type	Completed	Date designated	Grid ref. Geo-coordinates	Notes	Entry number	Image	Wikidata
3 and 4, Nunnery Fields	II	3 and 4, Nunnery Fields			7 September 1973	TR1516857261; 51°16′26″N 1°05′00″E		1241141	Upload Photo	Q26534029
5-14, Nunnery Fields	II	5-14, Nunnery Fields			7 September 1973	TR1514957214; 51°16′24″N 1°04′59″E		1241182	Upload Photo	Q26534068
1, Nunnery Fields, 48 and 50 Old Dover Road	II	1, Nunnery Fields, 48 and 50 Old Dover Road			7 September 1973	TR1519757272; 51°16′26″N 1°05′02″E		1260564	Upload Photo	Q26551569

=== Oaten Hill ===
Name	Grade	Location	Type	Completed	Date designated	Grid ref. Geo-coordinates	Notes	Entry number	Image	Wikidata
16 and 17, Oaten Hill	II	16 and 17, Oaten Hill			7 September 1973	TR1525457307; 51°16′27″N 1°05′05″E		1260646	Upload Photo	Q26551645
18-22, Oaten Hill	II	18-22, Oaten Hill			7 September 1973	TR1524757293; 51°16′27″N 1°05′05″E		1241143	Upload Photo	Q26534031
St Sepulchre's	II	23, Oaten Hill			7 September 1973	TR1522957277; 51°16′26″N 1°05′04″E		1241188	Upload Photo	Q26534074
Cross Keys Inn	II	24, Oaten Hill			3 May 1967	TR1520457294; 51°16′27″N 1°05′02″E		1241189	Upload Photo	Q26534075
2-4, Oaten Hill	II	2-4, Oaten Hill			7 September 1973	TR1529657355; 51°16′29″N 1°05′07″E		1260645	Upload Photo	Q26551644
Oaten Hill House	II	27, Oaten Hill			7 September 1973	TR1522757309; 51°16′27″N 1°05′04″E		1241190	Upload Photo	Q26534076
28, Oaten Hill	II	28, Oaten Hill			7 September 1973	TR1523557315; 51°16′28″N 1°05′04″E		1241191	Upload Photo	Q26534077
Oast Cottage the Cottage	II	33, Oaten Hill			3 November 1975	TR1526957351; 51°16′29″N 1°05′06″E		1259748	Upload Photo	Q26550841
5, Oaten Hill	II	5, Oaten Hill			7 September 1973	TR1528957348; 51°16′29″N 1°05′07″E		1241184	Upload Photo	Q26534070
6 and 7, Oaten Hill	II	6 and 7, Oaten Hill			7 September 1973	TR1528657342; 51°16′28″N 1°05′07″E		1241142	Upload Photo	Q26534030

=== Oaten Hill Place ===
Name	Grade	Location	Type	Completed	Date designated	Grid ref. Geo-coordinates	Notes	Entry number	Image	Wikidata
Maltings	II	Oaten Hill Place			7 September 1973	TR1527057371; 51°16′29″N 1°05′06″E		1241192	Upload Photo	Q26534078
1, Oaten Hill Place	II	1, Oaten Hill Place			7 September 1973	TR1525857368; 51°16′29″N 1°05′05″E		1260629	Upload Photo	Q26551629
Old City of Canterbury Public House	II	2, Oaten Hill Place			7 September 1973	TR1526557393; 51°16′30″N 1°05′06″E		1241193	Upload Photo	Q26534079
4, Oaten Hill Place	II	4, Oaten Hill Place			7 September 1973	TR1525357386; 51°16′30″N 1°05′05″E		1260630	Upload Photo	Q26551630
8, Oaten Hill Place, 6 Oaten Hill Place	II	8, Oaten Hill Place, 6 Oaten Hill Place			7 September 1973	TR1524557379; 51°16′30″N 1°05′05″E		1241194	Upload Photo	Q26534080

=== Old Dover Road ===
Name	Grade	Location	Type	Completed	Date designated	Grid ref. Geo-coordinates	Notes	Entry number	Image	Wikidata
The Old Forge	II	81, Old Dover Road			7 September 1973	TR1549657021; 51°16′18″N 1°05′17″E		1241326	Upload Photo	Q26534208
121 and 123, Old Dover Road	II	121 and 123, Old Dover Road			7 September 1973	TR1568756844; 51°16′12″N 1°05′26″E		1241352	Upload Photo	Q26534233
Garden Wall to No 136	II	136, Old Dover Road			7 September 1973	TR1568456822; 51°16′11″N 1°05′26″E		1260530	Upload Photo	Q26551536
19-33, Old Dover Road	II	19-33, Old Dover Road			7 September 1973	TR1511257384; 51°16′30″N 1°04′58″E		1260631	Upload Photo	Q26551631
Vernon Grange	II	35, Old Dover Road			3 May 1967	TR1513657374; 51°16′30″N 1°04′59″E		1241196	Upload Photo	Q26534082
37, Old Dover Road	II	37, Old Dover Road			3 May 1967	TR1515657349; 51°16′29″N 1°05′00″E		1241322	Upload Photo	Q26534204
46, Old Dover Road	II	46, Old Dover Road			7 September 1973	TR1519157279; 51°16′26″N 1°05′02″E		1241199	Upload Photo	Q26534085
The Hoystings	II*	64, Old Dover Road			3 December 1949	TR1525057206; 51°16′24″N 1°05′04″E		1260634	The Hoystings More images	Q17557204
Former Stable Adjoining No. 79	II	79, Old Dover Road			7 September 1973	TR1547557031; 51°16′18″N 1°05′16″E		1260632	Upload Photo	Q26551632
Sundial House	II	79, Old Dover Road			7 September 1973	TR1548557024; 51°16′18″N 1°05′16″E		1241197	Upload Photo	Q26534083
81A, Old Dover Road	II	81A, Old Dover Road			7 September 1973	TR1550257009; 51°16′17″N 1°05′17″E		1260633	Upload Photo	Q26551633

=== Old Ruttington Lane ===
Name	Grade	Location	Type	Completed	Date designated	Grid ref. Geo-coordinates	Notes	Entry number	Image	Wikidata
Christ Church University Music Centre (Former Church of St Gregory the Great)	II	Old Ruttington Lane			7 September 1973	TR1550958157; 51°16′54″N 1°05′20″E		1241372	Upload Photo	Q26534253

=== Pilgrims Way ===
Name	Grade	Location	Type	Completed	Date designated	Grid ref. Geo-coordinates	Notes	Entry number	Image	Wikidata
Cottages at Little Barton Farm	II	Pilgrims Way			7 September 1973	TR1673856824; 51°16′10″N 1°06′20″E		1241654	Upload Photo	Q26534516

=== Spring Lane ===
Name	Grade	Location	Type	Completed	Date designated	Grid ref. Geo-coordinates	Notes	Entry number	Image	Wikidata
Little Barton Farmhouse	II	Spring Lane			3 December 1949	TR1691457212; 51°16′22″N 1°06′30″E		1259932	Upload Photo	Q26551005

=== St George's Place ===
Name	Grade	Location	Type	Completed	Date designated	Grid ref. Geo-coordinates	Notes	Entry number	Image	Wikidata
St John's Board School	II	St John's Place			7 September 1973	TR1514358323; 51°17′00″N 1°05′01″E		1241918	Upload Photo	Q26534759
29-34, St George's Place	II	29-34, St George's Place			7 September 1973	TR1532357477; 51°16′33″N 1°05′09″E		1411995	29-34, St George's Place More images	Q26676244

=== St John's Place ===
Name	Grade	Location	Type	Completed	Date designated	Grid ref. Geo-coordinates	Notes	Entry number	Image	Wikidata
The Haven	II	10, St John's Place			7 September 1973	TR1515658280; 51°16′59″N 1°05′02″E		1260240	Upload Photo	Q26551281

=== St Lawrence's Fortstal ===
Name	Grade	Location	Type	Completed	Date designated	Grid ref. Geo-coordinates	Notes	Entry number	Image	Wikidata
Cricket Field House	II	St Lawrence's Fortstal			7 September 1973	TR1565956721; 51°16′08″N 1°05′25″E		1260242	Upload Photo	Q26551283
Oasthouse	II	St Lawrence's Fortstal			7 September 1973	TR1557956649; 51°16′06″N 1°05′20″E		1260210	Upload Photo	Q26682041

=== St Martin's Hill ===
Name	Grade	Location	Type	Completed	Date designated	Grid ref. Geo-coordinates	Notes	Entry number	Image	Wikidata
Church of St Martin	I	St Martin's Hill			3 December 1949	TR1586457757; 51°16′41″N 1°05′37″E		1242166	Upload Photo	Q840462
Garden Wall to St Martin's Priory	II	St Martin's Hill			3 May 1967	TR1592057687; 51°16′39″N 1°05′40″E		1260151	Upload Photo	Q26551204
Lychgate to St Martin's Church	II	St Martin's Hill			7 September 1973	TR1582257747; 51°16′41″N 1°05′35″E		1242169	Upload Photo	Q26534983
Querns Windmill	II	St Martin's Hill			3 December 1949	TR1607457800; 51°16′42″N 1°05′48″E		1242174	Upload Photo	Q7594196
St Martin's Priory	II	St Martin's Hill			3 May 1967	TR1590957700; 51°16′39″N 1°05′40″E		1242173	Upload Photo	Q26534987
Wall Surrounding Churchyard	II	St Martin's Hill			7 September 1973	TR1583657742; 51°16′41″N 1°05′36″E		1242168	Upload Photo	Q26534982
1, St Martin's Hill	II	1, St Martin's Hill			7 September 1973	TR1580557693; 51°16′39″N 1°05′34″E		1242170	Upload Photo	Q26534984
11 and 13, St Martin's Hill	II	11 and 13, St Martin's Hill			7 September 1973	TR1587057685; 51°16′39″N 1°05′37″E		1260142	Upload Photo	Q26551195
3 and 5, St Martin's Hill	II	3 and 5, St Martin's Hill			7 September 1973	TR1581557692; 51°16′39″N 1°05′35″E		1242225	Upload Photo	Q26535036
7, St Martin's Hill	II	7, St Martin's Hill			7 September 1973	TR1582557690; 51°16′39″N 1°05′35″E		1242171	Upload Photo	Q26534985
9, St Martin's Hill	II	9, St Martin's Hill			3 May 1967	TR1585757686; 51°16′39″N 1°05′37″E		1260150	Upload Photo	Q26551203

=== St Radigund Street ===
Name	Grade	Location	Type	Completed	Date designated	Grid ref. Geo-coordinates	Notes	Entry number	Image	Wikidata
1, St Radigund Street	II	1, St Radigund Street			7 September 1973	TR1510358223; 51°16′57″N 1°04′59″E		1065775	Upload Photo	Q26318811
2 and 3, St Radigund Street	II	2 and 3, St Radigund Street			7 September 1973	TR1509658228; 51°16′57″N 1°04′59″E		1357523	Upload Photo	Q26640035

=== Station Road East ===
Name	Grade	Location	Type	Completed	Date designated	Grid ref. Geo-coordinates	Notes	Entry number	Image	Wikidata
Canterbury East Signal Box	II	Station Road East			25 April 2013	TR1472457251; 51°16′26″N 1°04′37″E		1413579	Upload Photo	Q26676351

=== Sturry Road ===
Name	Grade	Location	Type	Completed	Date designated	Grid ref. Geo-coordinates	Notes	Entry number	Image	Wikidata
Wall to South West of Jesus Hospital	II	Sturry Road			7 September 1973	TR1544658494; 51°17′05″N 1°05′17″E		1242655	Upload Photo	Q26535419
Jesus Hospital	II	8-14, Sturry Road			3 December 1949	TR1547558502; 51°17′06″N 1°05′19″E		1242737	Upload Photo	Q26535488

=== Union Row ===
Name	Grade	Location	Type	Completed	Date designated	Grid ref. Geo-coordinates	Notes	Entry number	Image	Wikidata
1-10, Union Row	II	1-10, Union Row			15 March 1973	TR1542657615; 51°16′37″N 1°05′14″E		1259850	Upload Photo	Q26550932
King William IV Public House	II	Union Street			7 September 1973	TR1528258275; 51°16′58″N 1°05′08″E		1242768	Upload Photo	Q26535513

=== Upper Bridge Street ===
Name	Grade	Location	Type	Completed	Date designated	Grid ref. Geo-coordinates	Notes	Entry number	Image	Wikidata
11, Upper Bridge Street	II	11, Upper Bridge Street			7 September 1973	TR1510857511; 51°16′34″N 1°04′58″E		1242828	Upload Photo	Q26535561

=== Upper Chantry Lane ===
Name	Grade	Location	Type	Completed	Date designated	Grid ref. Geo-coordinates	Notes	Entry number	Image	Wikidata
The Shrubbery	II	3 and 4, Upper Chantry Lane			7 September 1973	TR1531657395; 51°16′30″N 1°05′08″E		1259881	Upload Photo	Q26550960

=== Wincheap ===
Name	Grade	Location	Type	Completed	Date designated	Grid ref. Geo-coordinates	Notes	Entry number	Image	Wikidata
K6 Telephone Kiosk	II	Wincheap			1 March 1989	TR1452157335; 51°16′29″N 1°04′27″E		1258428	Upload Photo	Q26549663
10 and 12, Wincheap	II	10 and 12, Wincheap			7 September 1973	TR1449757340; 51°16′29″N 1°04′26″E		1259803	Upload Photo	Q26550891
Bollards and Railings Outside Nos 10 to 28 (Even)	II	10 to 28 (Even) , Wincheap			7 September 1973	TR1447957312; 51°16′28″N 1°04′25″E		1242987	Upload Photo	Q26535704
11, Wincheap	II	11, Wincheap			7 September 1973	TR1447257282; 51°16′27″N 1°04′25″E		1242962	Upload Photo	Q26535680
Bollards on A Raised Bank in Front of Nos 11 to 17 (Odd)	II	11 to 17 (Odd), Wincheap			7 September 1973	TR1447057293; 51°16′28″N 1°04′24″E		1242964	Upload Photo	Q26535682
Thanington Place	II	126-136, Wincheap			7 September 1973	TR1423657122; 51°16′23″N 1°04′12″E		1259774	Upload Photo	Q26550867
13, Wincheap	II	13, Wincheap			7 September 1973	TR1446757278; 51°16′27″N 1°04′24″E		1242881	Upload Photo	Q26535606
14 and 16, Wincheap	II	14 and 16, Wincheap			7 September 1973	TR1449457332; 51°16′29″N 1°04′26″E		1242967	Upload Photo	Q26535685
Thanington House	II	140, Wincheap			3 May 1967	TR1420857097; 51°16′22″N 1°04′11″E		1258050	Upload Photo	Q26549341
15 and 17, Wincheap	II	15 and 17, Wincheap			7 September 1973	TR1446257275; 51°16′27″N 1°04′24″E		1259801	Upload Photo	Q26550889
152-158, Wincheap	II	152-158, Wincheap			7 September 1973	TR1418657074; 51°16′21″N 1°04′09″E		1258057	Upload Photo	Q26549346
160-164, Wincheap	II	160-164, Wincheap			7 September 1973	TR1417457061; 51°16′21″N 1°04′09″E		1258052	Upload Photo	Q26549343
The King's Head Inn	II	198-204, Wincheap			3 May 1967	TR1409257008; 51°16′19″N 1°04′04″E		1258059	Upload Photo	Q26549348
21, Wincheap	II	21, Wincheap			7 September 1973	TR1443157243; 51°16′26″N 1°04′22″E		1242965	Upload Photo	Q26535683
22 and 24, Wincheap	II	22 and 24, Wincheap			7 September 1973	TR1445657305; 51°16′28″N 1°04′24″E		1259804	Upload Photo	Q26550892
23, 25 and 29, Wincheap	II	23, 25 and 29, Wincheap			7 September 1973	TR1442757231; 51°16′26″N 1°04′22″E		1259802	Upload Photo	Q26550890
26, Wincheap	II	26, Wincheap			7 September 1973	TR1444857297; 51°16′28″N 1°04′23″E		1242968	Upload Photo	Q26535686
The Maiden's Head Inn	II	28, Wincheap			3 May 1967	TR1443857295; 51°16′28″N 1°04′23″E		1242969	Upload Photo	Q26535687
33 and 35, Wincheap	II	33 and 35, Wincheap			3 May 1967	TR1439657216; 51°16′25″N 1°04′21″E		1242966	Upload Photo	Q26535684
42-48, Wincheap	II	42-48, Wincheap			7 September 1973	TR1441257269; 51°16′27″N 1°04′21″E		1242988	Upload Photo	Q26535705
50 and 52, Wincheap	II	50 and 52, Wincheap			7 September 1973	TR1439857262; 51°16′27″N 1°04′21″E		1242989	Upload Photo	Q26535706
54-60, Wincheap	II	54-60, Wincheap			7 September 1973	TR1439157256; 51°16′27″N 1°04′20″E		1242990	Upload Photo	Q26535707
Duke's Head Public House	II	62, Wincheap			7 September 1973	TR1437357244; 51°16′26″N 1°04′19″E		1242991	Upload Photo	Q26535708
64, Wincheap	II	64, Wincheap			7 September 1973	TR1436857238; 51°16′26″N 1°04′19″E		1259772	Upload Photo	Q26550865
Wincheap House	II*	74, Wincheap			3 December 1949	TR1434457218; 51°16′26″N 1°04′18″E		1258047	Upload Photo	Q17557195
96-116, Wincheap	II	96-116, Wincheap			7 September 1973	TR1427657161; 51°16′24″N 1°04′14″E		1258048	Upload Photo	Q26549339

== See also ==
- Grade I listed buildings in Kent
- Grade II* listed buildings in Kent

== Sources ==
- Newman, John (2013) [1969], Kent: North-East and East, The Buildings of England, New Haven and London: Yale University Press, ISBN 978-0-300-18506-5
