= Rigden =

Rigden may refer to:

== People with the surname ==
- Horace Walter Rigden (1898–1986), English chemist and oil industry executive
- John S. Rigden (1934–2017), American physicist

== Other uses ==
- Kings of Shambhala
