= Horace Walter Rigden =

Horace Walter Rigden, OBE, (2 April 1898 – 1986) was an English chemist and oil industry executive who managed the Anglo-Persian oil refinery at Abadan in Iran during the 1930s and World War II, receiving the Order of the British Empire in 1945 for his service.

== Early life ==
Horace Walter Rigden was born in Highgate, London, on 2 April 1898 to Walter Thomas Rigden, an advertising contractor, and Jane Rigden. Horace had a sister Amy and a brother Thomas. He worked as a laboratory assistant and after the outbreak of World War I joined the Royal Flying Corps on 19 August 1915 where he served as an Air Mechanic 2nd Class. On 1 April 1918 he joined the Royal Air Force where he served as a Second Lieutenant. He was discharged on 5 June 1918. His advanced education was delayed by the war and he enrolled at the University of London, graduating in 1922 with a Bachelor of Science degree.

== Career ==
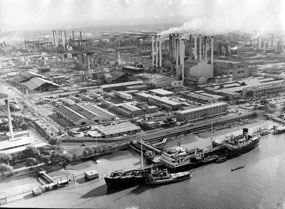
The Abadan refinery in 1950.

Rigden was employed by the Anglo-Persian Oil Company in Abadan, Iran, which eventually became BP. He managed the Abadan oil refinery during the 1930s and the Second World War, a period when its production was of vital strategic interest to the British government, and received the Order of the British Empire in 1945 for his service. Rigden was a fellow of the Royal Institute of Chemistry.

== Family ==
Rigden married Frances Helena Shilling (born 12 July 1903) on 20 Mar 1926 at All Saints Church, Whitstable. Their daughter Jill Allibone, who was born at Abadan in 1932 (died 1998), was a distinguished architectural historian who founded The Mausolea and Monuments Trust.
