= Jill Allibone =

English architectural historian (1932–1998)

Jill Spencer Allibone (26 April 1932 – 3 February 1998) was an English architectural historian and the founder of the Mausolea and Monuments Trust. She wrote studies of Anthony Salvin and George Devey, and was a justice of the peace for over 20 years.

== Early life ==
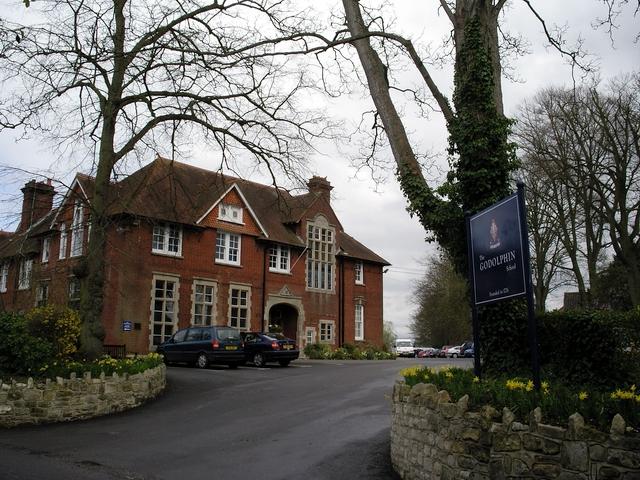
The Godolphin School, Salisbury.

Allibone was born Jill Spencer Rigden in Abadan, Iran, on 26 April 1932, where her father, Horace Walter Rigden, managed the Anglo-Persian oil refinery. She spent her youth in Iran apart from a period during the Second World War where she was evacuated to South Africa. She was educated at Godolphin School, Salisbury, and then St Martin's School of Art. In 1954 she joined the Courtauld Institute where she was a contemporary of Brian Sewell. At that time she met her future husband, the solicitor David Allibone, whom she married in 1957 before she had finished her degree. They lived in Kent. She took her finals while pregnant with her first child. According to Sewell, she only married David Allibone after first enquiring about Sewell's intentions towards her, apparently being unaware that he was gay.

== Career ==
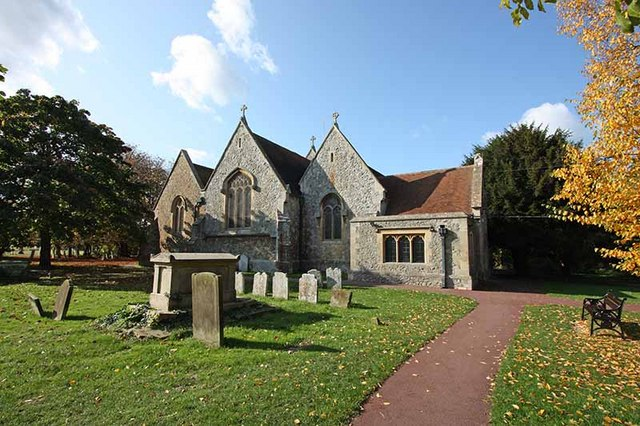
All Saints Church, Whitstable.

After the birth of three daughters, Allibone returned to the Courtauld to complete a PhD on the Gothic architect Anthony Salvin, which was published in 1987. Her supervisor was Nikolaus Pevsner, the first chairman of the Victorian Society, with which Allibone became closely involved. Her study of George Devey, known for his Kentish works, was published in 1991. She catalogued his drawings in the British Architectural Library. In 1996 she contributed essays to The Inns of Court (Black Dog Publishing, 2001).

While visiting her grandmother's grave at All Saints Church in Whitstable, Kent, Allibone chanced upon a mausoleum designed by Charles Barry junior in 1875, for Wynne Ellis, a wealthy haberdasher and donor to the National Gallery. Seeing that the tomb was decaying, Allibone tracked down the owners and applied to have the site listed with English Heritage. It is now a grade II listed monument. This kindled Allibone's interest in funerary monuments and in 1997, she founded the Mausolea and Monuments Trust, which is able to take over monuments in order to maintain and protect them.

Allibone was a fellow of the Society of Antiquaries of London.

== Outside architecture ==
Allibone was appointed a Justice of the Peace for the South Westminster Bench in 1966, in which capacity she served for over 20 years.

== Death ==
Allibone died in Tunbridge Wells, Kent, on 3 February 1998. She is buried with her husband David Allibone (died 2007) at St George's church, Benenden, Kent.

== Selected publications ==
- Anthony Salvin, Pioneer of Gothic Revival Architecture 1799–1881, University of Missouri Press, Columbia, 1987.
- George Devey: Architect 1820–1886, Lutterworth Press, 1991. ISBN 0718827856
- Wall Paintings of Garton-on-the-Wolds, Pevsner Memorial Trust, 1991. ISBN 0951843001
