= Wynne Ellis =

19th century British merchant, politician, and art collector (1790–1875)

Wynne Ellis (also Wynn Ellis) (1790–1875) was a wealthy British haberdasher, politician and art collector.

== Biography ==
Ellis, son of Thomas Ellis, by Elizabeth Ordway of Barkway, Hertfordshire, was born at Oundle, Northamptonshire, in July 1790, and after receiving a good education came to London.

=== Business career ===
In 1812 Ellis became a haberdasher, hosier, and mercer at 16 Ludgate Street, city of London, where he gradually created the largest silk business in London, adding house to house as opportunity occurred of purchasing the property around him, and passing from the retail to a wholesale business in 1830. After his retirement in 1871 his firm assumed the title of John Howell & Co.

=== Political life ===
In 1831 Ellis withdrew his candidature for the aldermanic ward of Castle Baynard to contest the parliamentary representation of Leicester. As an advanced liberal he sat for Leicester from 4 May 1831 to 29 December 1834 and again from 22 March 1839 to 23 July 1847. He was an advocate for the total repeal of the corn laws, of free trade generally, of reform in bankruptcy, and of greater freedom in the law of partnership. In the committees of the House of Commons he exercised considerable influence. He left political life in 1847.

=== Personal life ===
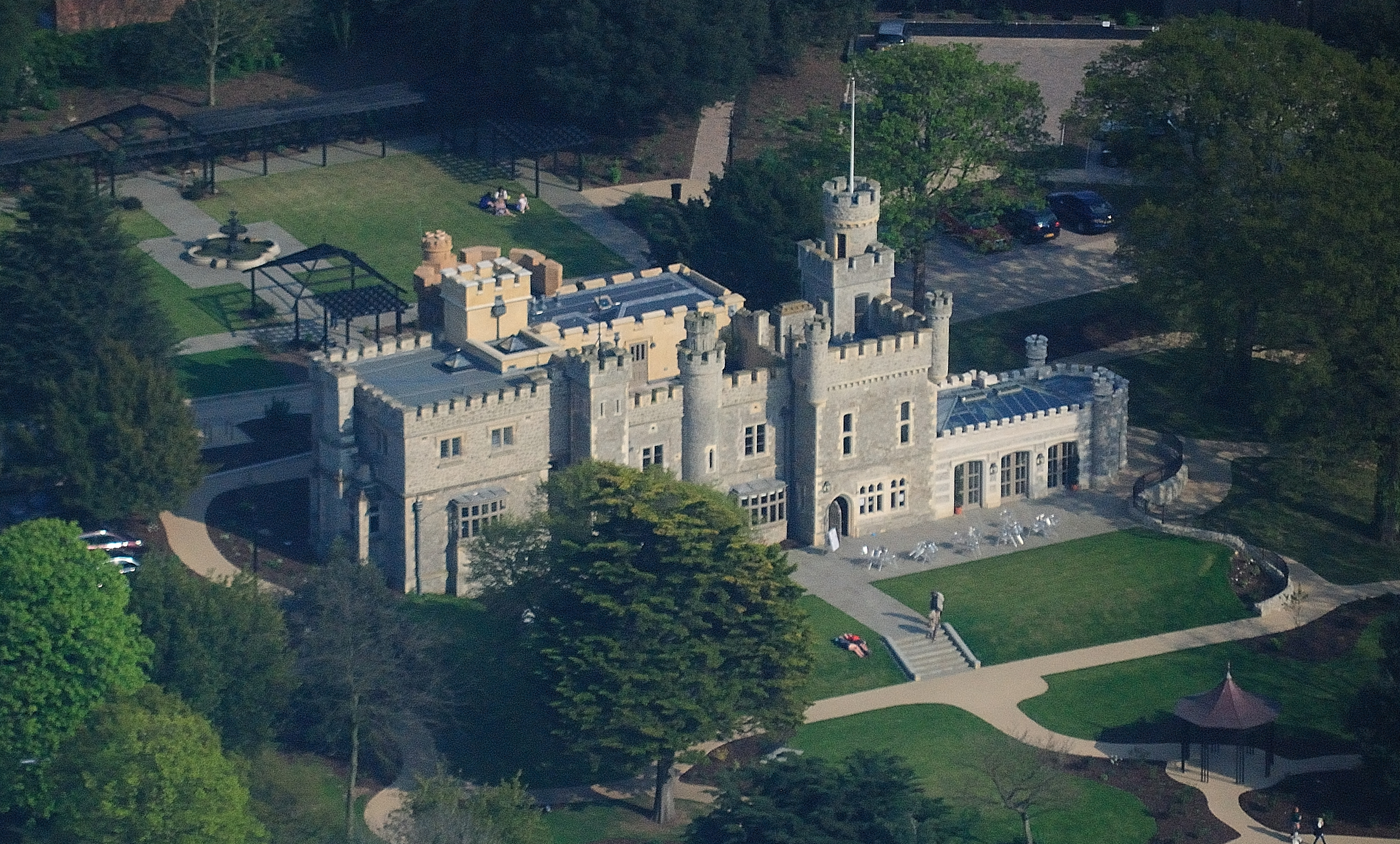
Whitstable Castle, aerial photograph from 2011

Ellis purchased the manor of Ponsbourne Park, Hertfordshire, in 1836, and sold it in May 1875. He was a justice of the peace both for Hertfordshire and Kent, and was picked to serve as sheriff for the latter county, but was excused in consideration of his having discharged corresponding duties for Hertfordshire in 1851–2. He also owned Tankerton Tower, near Canterbury. It was a family property, inherited by his wife from her maternal uncle. He extended it substantially as a house which came to be known as Whitstable Castle.

Ellis had an intense dislike of betting, horseracing, and gambling, though he was a lover of other sports. He died at his residence, 30 Cadogan Place, Sloane Street, London on 20 November 1875 and was buried with his wife, who had died in 1872, at All Saints Whitstable.

=== Legacy ===
By his will Ellis left numerous legacies to charitable and religious institutions. These included £50,000 left to the trustees of the Simeon Fund. His personalty was proved under £600,000 on 8 January 1876.

==== Art collection and legacy ====
Ellis made an extensive collection of paintings, many of which were described in Gustav Friedrich Waagen's Treasures of Art, vol. II 293–8. He owned the Temple of Jupiter Panhellenius at Ægina by J. M. W. Turner. He was a committed collector, who also relied on outside advice, with mixed results. His Old Master pictures, 402 in number, he left to the nation; of these the trustees of the National Gallery, London selected 44, which were exhibited as the Wynne Ellis collection. In all, the Gallery retained 94 works.

The remainder of the Old Masters, together with the modern pictures, watercolours, porcelain, decorative furniture, marbles, and other objects, were disposed of at Christie, Manson, & Wood's in five days' sale in May, June and July 1876, when the total proceeds were £56,098. 2s. 3d. In the sale of 6 May Thomas Gainsborough's portrait of Georgiana, duchess of Devonshire, was purchased by Thomas Agnew & Sons for £10,605. The Agnews exhibited the painting at their rooms, 39B Old Bond Street, London where, on the night of 26 May, the canvas was cut out and stolen. It was finally recovered in Chicago in 1901 and purchased by the American financier and collector J. P. Morgan.

==== Built environment ====
He built the Wynn Ellis almshouses in Whitstable, setting up a charitable trust which still exists. They were in memory of his wife.

In the 1990s, the discovery that the Wynne mausoleum at All Saints, Whitstable, designed by Charles Barry Junior was decaying was the spur for Jill Allibone to found the Mausolea and Monuments Trust. It became a Grade II listed building in October 1997.

== Family ==
Ellis married in 1814 Mary Maria, daughter of John Smith of Lincoln. She died in 1872, and was buried in a mausoleum designed by Charles Barry, and built in Whitstable churchyard.
