= Barbara Callcott =

- Callcott c. 2012
- Born: Barbara Farrell c. 1947; Holywood, Northern Ireland
- Died: 10 May 2013 (aged 66); Noosa, Queensland, Australia
- Occupation: Actress
- Spouse: Frank Callcott

Barbara Callcott (née Farrell, c. 1947 – 10 May 2013) was an Irish-born Australian television personality, best known for her portrayal of the schoolteacher "Mrs Marsh" in a series of Colgate toothpaste advertisements that ran from 1976 to 1991.

After the long-running television and print commercials began in the 1970s, she became a pop culture icon in Australia and New Zealand. Although the series ended in 1991, she continued intermittently in the campaign until shortly before her death. She continued to support the education of Australian children on the benefits of good oral health habits off-screen as well as publicly.

== Death ==
Callcott died of cancer in Noosa, Queensland on 10 May 2013, aged 66. After her death, Colgate established an education grant in her name in recognition of her contribution to oral health education.
