= Holywood Priory =

Ruined Augustinitan monastery in County Down, Ireland

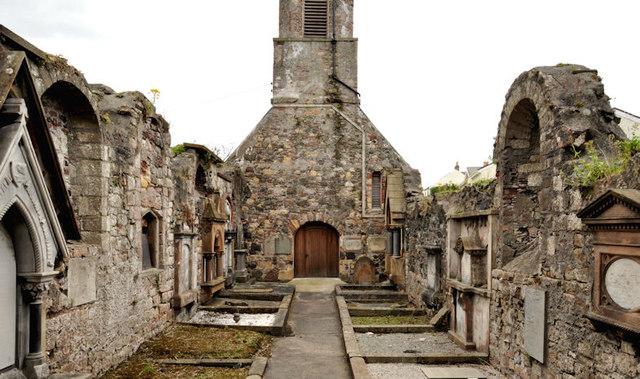
- Holywood Priory

- Location within Ireland
- Interactive map of Holywood Priory

Monastery information
- Order: Augustinians
- Established: 12th century

Site
- Location: Holywood, County Down, Ireland
- Coordinates: 54.64312°N 5.83126°W

Holywood Priory is a medieval monastic ruin in Holywood, County Down, Northern Ireland. Built in the late 12th or early 13th century on the site of an earlier monastery, it was later used by the Franciscans and dissolved in 1541 during the reign of Henry VIII.

== History ==
The monastery was founded on the site by St Laiseran before 640. The early settlement was associated with the nearby Bangor Abbey, where Laiseran is said to have studied under Comgall. The site was later known as Sanctus Boscus or Sanctus Nemus, and appears in early medieval records, including a reference to King John of England halting there in 1210.

The present ruins date primarily from a late 12th- or early 13th-century Anglo-Norman Augustinian abbey built by Thomas Whyte. Following the Black Death (1348–1350), the church was refurbished by Niall O’Neill for the Franciscan Order. The priory was dissolved on New Year’s Day 1541 during the reign of Henry VIII. Its lands passed first to the O’Neill family and later to James Hamilton, 1st Viscount Claneboye, who developed the surrounding town of Holywood.

The site continued in use in later centuries, including as Holywood’s parish church, with alterations such as the addition of the tower in the early 19th century.

== Description ==
The surviving structure is a stone church dating mainly from the late 12th or early 13th century. It consists of a nave and chancel without structural division, measuring approximately 22.5 metres by 6 metres internally, with a west tower. The building was originally entered from the south, but the west end was rebuilt in the 15th century with a new entrance and an enlarged east window. The upper stages of the tower were added in the early 19th century.

The masonry includes coursed rubble and ashlar, using local limestone known as Cultra Stone as well as red sandstone. Architectural features include a piscina with trefoil head and dog-tooth ornament.

The south wall contains several blocked 17th-century windows. A 13th-century coffin lid, formerly set into the wall and now held at the North Down Heritage Centre, is decorated with a cross and foliage, with a pair of shears thought to indicate a female burial.

== Graveyard ==
The adjacent graveyard contains the burials of several notable figures, including the educational reformer Robert Sullivan, members of the Praeger family, the Dunville family, and the mathematician Sir Joseph Larmor.

== See also ==
- Abbeys and priories in Northern Ireland
- List of monastic houses in Ireland
