= James Stevens Curl =

British architectural historian (1937–2025)

James Stevens Curl, MRIA FSA FSA Scot FRIAS (26 March 1937 – 5 November 2025) was a British architectural historian, architect and author with an extensive range of publications to his name.

== Early life and education ==
The son of George Stevens Curl (1903–1974), who worked as an inspector of agents for the Eagle Star Insurance Company, and Sarah (née McKinney), Curl was born in Belfast, Northern Ireland, on 26 March 1937. He was educated at Campbell College, Belfast, at Queen's University Belfast, and at Belfast College of Art before studying at the Oxford School of Architecture (now part of Oxford Brookes University) where he qualified in Architecture (1963) and – having studied under Arthur Korn – in Town Planning (1967). He read for his doctorate at University College London, which he received in 1981.

== Career ==
Curl was Professor at the School of Architecture and Design, Ulster University, Professor Emeritus at De Montfort University, Leicester, and has been a Visiting Fellow at Peterhouse, Cambridge (1991–92, 2002). An honorary Doctor of Arts degree was conferred on him by De Montfort University in 2014 in recognition of his "distinctive contribution to the study of Architectural History" and of his "outstanding contributions to the intellectual and cultural life of the nation and the region".

== Personal life and death ==
In 1960, Curl married psychiatrist Eileen Elizabeth Blackstock; they had two daughters. His second marriage, in 1993, was to Professor (Stanisława) Dorota Iwaniec. Curl died on 5 November 2025, at the age of 88.

== Honours ==
Curl was a Member of the Royal Irish Academy, a Fellow of the Society of Antiquaries of London, a Fellow of the Society of Antiquaries of Scotland, a Fellow of the Royal Incorporation of Architects in Scotland, a member of the Royal Institute of the Architects of Ireland, a member of the Royal Institute of British Architects, and a Liveryman of the Worshipful Company of Chartered Architects of the City of London.

In September 2017, he was awarded the President's Medal of the British Academy "for his contribution to the study of the History of Architecture in Britain and Ireland".

== Memberships ==
Curl was the first Chairman of Oxford Civic Society, which was founded in 1969. He was Joint Patron of the Mausolea and Monuments Trust, President of the Friends of Southampton Old Cemetery, a Vice-President of the Friends of Kensal Green Cemetery, a member of the Art Workers' Guild, and a member of the Oxford & Cambridge Club.

== Selected works ==
- The Erosion of Oxford. Oxford: Oxford Illustrated Press. 1977. ISBN 0-902280-40-6.
- English Architecture: An Illustrated Glossary (Newton Abbot: David & Charles, 1987). New revised edition of the book originally published in 1977. ISBN 0-7153-8887-8
- The Londonderry Plantation 1609–1914. The History, Architecture, and Planning of the Estates of the City of London in Ulster (Chichester: Phillimore, 1986). ISBN 0-85033-577-9
- English Architecture: An Illustrated Glossary (Toronto, Ottawa, Halifax, Winnipeg, Edmonton. & Vancouver: Fitzhenry & Whiteside, 1987). ISBN 0-88902-943-1
- Victorian Architecture (Newton Abbot: David & Charles, 1990). ISBN 0-7153-9144-5
- Simon Stringer, Sculptor: Catalogue of Exhibition at the Goldmark Gallery, Uppingham (Uppingham: Goldmark Gallery, 1990). ISBN 1-870507-09-6
- The Art and Architecture of Freemasonry. An Introductory Study (London: B T Batsford, 1991). Winner of the RIBA Sir Banister Fletcher Award for Best Book of the Year on Architecture, 1992. ISBN 0-7134-5827-5
- The Art and Architecture of Freemasonry: An Introductory Study (Woodstock & New York: Overlook Press, 1993). ISBN 0-87951-494-9
- Classical Architecture: An Introduction to Its Vocabulary and Essentials, with a Select Glossary of Terms (London: B T Batsford, 1992). ISBN 0-7134-6772-X
- Victorian Architecture (Newton Abbot: David & Charles Publishers plc, 1992) Paperback edition of the 1990 hardback. ISBN 0-7153-9144-5
- Classical Architecture: An Introduction to its Vocabulary and Essentials, with a Select Glossary of Terms (New York: Van Nostrand Reinhold, 1992). ISBN 0-442-30896-5
- Encyclopaedia of Architectural Terms (Wimbledon, London: Donhead Publishing, 1993). ISBN 1-873394-04-7
- Georgian Architecture (Newton Abbot: David & Charles, 1993). ISBN 0-7153-9851-2
- A Celebration of Death: An Introduction to Some of the Buildings, Monuments, and Settings of Funerary Architecture in the Western European Tradition (London: B T Batsford, 1993). ISBN 0-7134-7336-3
- Egyptomania: The Egyptian Revival as a Recurring Theme in the History of Taste (Manchester: Manchester University Press, 1994). ISBN 0-7190-4126-0 (hbk.) and 0‑7190-4127-9 (pbk.)
- The English Heritage Book of Victorian Churches (London: B T Batsford & English Heritage, 1995). ISBN 0-7134-7491-2 and 0-17134-7490-4
- Georgian Architecture (Newton Abbot: David & Charles, 1996). ISBN 0-7153-9851-2. Paperback edition
- Encyclopaedia of Architectural Terms (Shaftesbury: Donhead Publishing, 1997). ISBN 1-873394-25-X
- Oxford Dictionary of Architecture (Oxford: Oxford University Press, 1999). ISBN 0-19-210006-8
- Oxford Dictionary of Architecture in the Oxford Paperback Reference Series (Oxford: Oxford University Press, 2000) ISBN 0-19-280017-5
- The Honourable The Irish Society and the Plantation of Ulster, 1608–2000: The City of London and the Colonisation of County Londonderry in the Province of Ulster in Ireland: A History and Critique (Chichester: Phillimore, 2000). ISBN 1-86077-136-X
- The Victorian Celebration of Death (Thrupp, Stroud: Sutton Publishing, 2000). ISBN 0-7509-2318-0
- Classical Architecture: An Introduction to its Vocabulary and Essentials, with a Select Glossary of Terms (London: B T Batsford, 2001). ISBN 0-7134-86848
- Classical Architecture: An Introduction to its Vocabulary and Essentials, with a Select Glossary of Terms (New York & London: W W Norton, 2001). ISBN 0-393-73119-7
- The Art and Architecture of Freemasonry: An Introductory Study (London: B T Batsford, 2002). ISBN 0-7134-8745-3
- The Art and Architecture of Freemasonry: An Introductory Study (Woodstock, NY: Overlook Press, 2002). ISBN 1-58567-160-6
- Piety Proclaimed: An Introduction to Places of Worship in Victorian England (London: Historical Publications, 2002). ISBN 0-948667-77-X
- Death and Architecture: An Introduction to Funerary and Commemorative Buildings in the Western European Tradition, with Some Consideration of their Settings (Thrupp, Stroud: Sutton Publishing, 2002). ISBN 0-7509-2877-8
- Georgian Architecture (Newton Abbot: David & Charles, 2002). ISBN 0-7153-0227-2
- The Victorian Celebration of Death (Thrupp, Stroud: Sutton Publishing, 2004). ISBN 978-0-7509-3873-0
- The Egyptian Revival: Ancient Egypt as the Inspiration for Design Motifs in the West (Abingdon & New York: Routledge Taylor & Francis Group, 2005). ISBN 978-0-415-36119-4 and 9-78-0-415-36118-7
- A Dictionary of Architecture and Landscape Architecture (Oxford: Oxford University Press, 2006). ISBN 0-19-860678-8 and 0-19-2806300
- Victorian Architecture: Diversity & Invention (Reading: Spire Books, 2007). ISBN 978-1-904965-06-0
- John Claudius Loudon (1783–1843) and the Cemetery Movement (Southampton: Friends of Southampton Old Cemetery, 2008)
- Two Outstanding Monuments in the General Cemetery of All Souls, Kensal Green: The French Connection and Other Matters. Special Issue 53 of the Magazine of the Friends of Kensal Green Cemetery (September 2009), ISSN 1753-4402 (London: Friends of Kensal Green Cemetery)
- Spas, Wells, and Pleasure-Gardens of London (London: Historical Publications, 2010). ISBN 978-1-905286-34-8
- The Protestant Cemetery in Rome. Special Issue 55 of the Magazine of the Friends of Kensal Green Cemetery (January 2010) ISSN 1753-4402 (London: Friends of Kensal Green Cemetery)
- Freemasonry and the Enlightenment: Architecture, Symbols, & Influences (London: Historical Publications, 2011) ISBN 978-1-905286-45-4
- Georgian Architecture in the British Isles 1715–1830 (Swindon: English Heritage, 2011). ISBN 978-1-84802-086-3
- Funerary Monuments and Memorials in St Patrick’s Cathedral, Armagh (Whitstable: Historical Publications, 2013) ISBN 978-1-905286-49-2 and 978-1-905286-48-5
- Making Dystopia: The Strange Rise and Survival of Architectural Barbarism (Oxford: Oxford University Press, 2018) ISBN 978-0-198753-69-8
- Classical Architecture: Language, Variety, & Adaptability (London: John Hudson Publishing, 2025) ISBN 978-1-7398229-2-7
- The Life and Work of Thomas Downes Wilmot Dearn (1777-1853) (Holywood: The Nerfl Press, 2025) ISBN 978-0-9529780-7-7
