= Stephen Brown (Jesuit) =

Stephen James Meridith Brown (born 24 September 1881 in Holywood, County Down, Ireland, died on the 8th of May 1962, in Kilcrony, Wicklow, Ireland) was an Irish Catholic Jesuit priest, writer, bibliographer and librarian. He founded the Central Catholic Library (Irish: Leabharlann an Chreidimh) in Dublin.

== Life ==
Although he was born in County Down, Stephen Brown spent his early years in Naas, County Kildare, where his father was a solicitor and Chairman of Kildare County Council (1899–1911).

He was educated at Clongowes Wood College and entered the Jesuit noviceship in 1897. He studied philosophy in Jersey, and was ordained in 1914.

He initially taught at Maynooth College, and afterwards established the post-graduate school in librarianship at University College Dublin, an interest he maintained for some 24 years. In 1922 he set up the Central Catholic Library, where he later served as director. He served on the Hospital Library Council and as Director of the Academy of Christian Art. In 1953 he received a certificate of Honorary Fellowship from the Library Association of Ireland, for his contribution to the development of the library profession in Ireland.

While involved with the Central Catholic Library and other, mainly library-based, activities, he was also a prolific writer of books, bibliographies and articles of all kinds up to the end of his life.

In September 1960, Fr Brown became incapacitated as the result of a serious road accident in London. A fractured skull and rib injuries forced him to spend four months in the Hospital of St John and St Elizabeth in Grove End Road in London. He returned to Dublin but never recovered from his injuries. He died in Milltown, Dublin.

== Works by Stephen Brown ==
The following is a small selection of the many works by Stephen Brown, S.J.:

- A Reader's Guide to Irish Fiction (1910)
- A Guide to Books on Ireland (Dublin: Talbot 1912)
- The Question of Irish Nationality (Dublin: Sealy, Bryers & Walker 1913)
- The Realm of Poetry: An Introduction (London: George G. Harrap & Company Ltd 1921)
- Ireland in Fiction: A Guide to Irish Novels, Tales, Romances and Folklore. Part I. Dublin: Maunsel. 1919.
  - Reprinted Shannon: IUP 1969
  - The first edition of Fr. Brown's Ireland in Fiction (1916) was printed by Maunsel but was destroyed by fire in the 1916 Rising.
- Brown, Stephen; Clarke, Desmond, eds. (1985). Ireland in Fiction: A Guide to Irish Novels, Tales, Romances and Folklore. Part II. Cork: Royal Carbery.
- The Central Catholic Library. The first ten years of an Irish enterprise. 1932.
- Poetry of Irish History, being a new and enlarged edition of Historical Ballad Poetry of Ireland, ed. M. J. Brown (Dublin: Talbot Press 1927)
- Novels and Tales by Catholic Writers (Dublin, 1930)
- Catholic Juvenile Literature: A Classified List (London: Burns, Oates & Co. 1935)
- The Press in Ireland: A Survey and a Guide. (Dublin: Browne & Nolan 1937).
- The Crusade for a Better World (on Riccardo Lombardi) (Dublin: Irish Messenger, 1956)

== Other sources ==
- Brady, Anne M. (1985). A Biographical Dictionary of Irish Writers. Mullingar: The Lilliput Press.
- Welch, Robert (1996). The Oxford Companion to Irish Literature. Oxford: Clarendon Press. ISBN 978-0-19-866158-0.
- Clarke, Desmond (1962). Obituary. Dublin: An Leabharlann 20 (June).
- Brown, Stephen (1942). The Capuchin Annual, contributors. Dublin: Capuchin Order.
