= Listed buildings in Canterbury (Herne Bay and Whitstable) =

Civil Parish in Kent, England

Canterbury is a city in Kent, England. The non-civil parish contains 1068 listed buildings that are recorded in the National Heritage List for England for Canterbury, Herne Bay and Whitstable. Of these 35 are grade I, 50 are grade II* and 983 are grade II.

This list covers Herne Bay and Whitstable. It is based on the information retrieved online from Historic England.

== Key ==
Grade	Criteria
I	Buildings that are of exceptional interest
II*	Particularly important buildings of more than special interest
II	Buildings that are of special interest

== Listing ==
Name	Grade	Location	Type	Completed (Note: The date given is the date used by Historic England as significant for the initial building or that of an important part in the structure's description.)	Date designated	Grid ref. (Note: The grid reference is based on the British national grid reference system, sometimes known as OSGB36, used by the Ordnance Survey.) Geo-coordinates	Notes	Entry number (Note: The "List Entry Number" is a unique number assigned to each listed building and scheduled monument by Historic England.)	Image	Wikidata
Sewer Vent Column	II	Albany Drive			23 March 2000	TR1679667878; 51°22′07″N 1°06′48″E		1380177	Upload Photo	
The Methodist Chapel	II	Albert Street			17 June 1975	TR1078666761; 51°21′39″N 1°01′35″E		1336853	Upload Photo	
25, Albert Street	II	25, Albert Street			20 May 1977	TR1076966766; 51°21′39″N 1°01′34″E		1087046	Upload Photo	
Church of St John (Methodist)	II	Argyle Road			20 May 1977	TR1072766305; 51°21′24″N 1°01′31″E		1087051	Upload Photo	
St John's Methodist Church Hall	II	Argyle Road			20 May 1977	TR1071366315; 51°21′25″N 1°01′30″E		1084960	Upload Photo	
Gas Lantern and Column Opposite No 2	II	2, Argyle Road			20 May 1977	TR1073766328; 51°21′25″N 1°01′31″E		1084959	Upload Photo	
The Cottage	II	21, Avenue Road			14 May 1976	TR1722168151; 51°22′15″N 1°07′10″E		1085035	Upload Photo	
La Sainte Union Convent School	II	41, Avenue Road			14 May 1976	TR1706068146; 51°22′15″N 1°07′02″E		1336849	Upload Photo	
3A and 5A, Bank Street, 1-7 Bank Street	II	3A and 5A, Bank Street, 1-7 Bank Street			14 May 1976	TR1800468348; 51°22′20″N 1°07′51″E		1085036	Upload Photo	
Downs Farm House	II	Belle Vue Road			20 May 1977	TR1154365827; 51°21′08″N 1°02′12″E		1084961	Upload Photo	
Golden Lion Public House	II	12, Belmont Road			20 May 1977	TR1084066053; 51°21′16″N 1°01′36″E		1084962	Upload Photo	
4-10, Belmont Road	II	4-10, Belmont Road			20 May 1977	TR1083666054; 51°21′16″N 1°01′36″E		1335874	Upload Photo	
Bishopstone Manor	II	Bishopstone Lane			29 May 1951	TR2099868714; 51°22′28″N 1°10′26″E		1336810	Upload Photo	
Borstal Hill Windmill	II	Borstal Hill			30 March 1951	TR1056365135; 51°20′47″N 1°01′20″E		1084964	Borstal Hill Windmill More images	Q964785
Grimshill	II	Borstal Hill			20 May 1977	TR1051565529; 51°20′59″N 1°01′18″E		1084963	Upload Photo	
The Four Horseshoes Public House	II	Borstal Hill			20 May 1977	TR1049565286; 51°20′52″N 1°01′17″E		1335865	Upload Photo	
18, Borstal Hill	II	18, Borstal Hill			20 May 1977	TR1047765535; 51°21′00″N 1°01′16″E		1084966	Upload Photo	
Tollgate Stores	II	2, Borstal Hill			20 May 1977	TR1050765608; 51°21′02″N 1°01′18″E		1084965	Upload Photo	
Waypost House	II	4, Borstal Hill			20 May 1977	TR1048565597; 51°21′02″N 1°01′17″E		1086997	Upload Photo	
5, Borstal Hill	II	5, Borstal Hill			20 May 1977	TR1051265488; 51°20′58″N 1°01′18″E		1335841	Upload Photo	
The Stone House	II	74, Borstal Hill			20 May 1977	TR1048265136; 51°20′47″N 1°01′16″E		1336854	Upload Photo	
Sea View	II	82A, Borstal Hill			20 May 1977	TR1048065060; 51°20′44″N 1°01′15″E		1084967	Upload Photo	
Brook Farmhouse	II	Brook Lane			14 May 1976	TR2200468088; 51°22′06″N 1°11′17″E		1085037	Upload Photo	
Gateway to North East of Brook Farmhouse	II	Brook Lane			29 September 1951	TR2202168105; 51°22′07″N 1°11′18″E		1336811	Upload Photo	
Oars Farmhouse	II	Brook Lane			14 May 1976	TR2259768102; 51°22′06″N 1°11′48″E		1336831	Upload Photo	
Old Mill House	II	Brook Lane			14 May 1976	TR2245567869; 51°21′59″N 1°11′40″E		1084995	Upload Photo	
Barn to Brook Farm	II	Brook Street			14 May 1976	TR2203468158; 51°22′09″N 1°11′19″E		1084994	Upload Photo	
Granary House	II	Canterbury Road			20 May 1977	TR1056765786; 51°21′08″N 1°01′21″E		1336855	Upload Photo	
K6 Telephone Kiosk Adjacent to Canterbury Road	II	Canterbury Road			12 December 2005	TR1827668394; 51°22′21″N 1°08′05″E		1391439	Upload Photo	
Little Cottage	II	Canterbury Road			14 May 1976	TR1809266990; 51°21′36″N 1°07′52″E		1085000	Upload Photo	
Sewer Vent Column	II	Canterbury Road			23 March 2000	TR1814267483; 51°21′52″N 1°07′56″E		1380176	Upload Photo	
The Stables of the Brewers Public House to the North West	II	Canterbury Road			20 May 1977	TR1060665794; 51°21′08″N 1°01′23″E		1086937	Upload Photo	
Railway Inn	II	1, Canterbury Road			20 May 1977	TR1078766051; 51°21′16″N 1°01′33″E		1084969	Upload Photo	
Laurel Cottages	II	1 and 2, Canterbury Road			14 May 1976	TR1808567025; 51°21′37″N 1°07′52″E		1336834	Upload Photo	
11-15, Canterbury Road	II	11-15, Canterbury Road			23 December 1975	TR1078666014; 51°21′15″N 1°01′33″E		1086949	Upload Photo	
17-25, Canterbury Road	II	17-25, Canterbury Road			23 December 1975	TR1077865996; 51°21′14″N 1°01′33″E		1336856	Upload Photo	
The Priory	II	203, Canterbury Road			29 September 1951	TR1809866953; 51°21′35″N 1°07′53″E		1115531	Upload Photo	
The Forge Cottage	II	250, Canterbury Road			14 May 1976	TR1806066993; 51°21′36″N 1°07′51″E		1085001	Upload Photo	
26, Canterbury Road	II	26, Canterbury Road			20 May 1977	TR1070865948; 51°21′13″N 1°01′29″E		1086972	Upload Photo	
27 and 29, Canterbury Road	II	27 and 29, Canterbury Road			23 December 1975	TR1076965978; 51°21′14″N 1°01′32″E		1084970	Upload Photo	
31-37, Canterbury Road	II	31-37, Canterbury Road			23 December 1975	TR1076565973; 51°21′13″N 1°01′32″E		1096850	Upload Photo	
The Two Brewers Public House	II	72, Canterbury Road			20 May 1977	TR1061965812; 51°21′08″N 1°01′24″E		1084968	Upload Photo	
99A, Canterbury Road	II	99A, Canterbury Road			20 May 1977	TR1064165795; 51°21′08″N 1°01′25″E		1336857	Upload Photo	
Drinking Fountain	II	Central Parade			14 May 1976	TR1775068424; 51°22′23″N 1°07′38″E		1115436	Upload Photo	
The Clock Tower	II	Central Parade			29 September 1951	TR1768968411; 51°22′23″N 1°07′35″E		1085006	The Clock Tower More images	Q15474366
The Pier Hotel	II	Central Parade			14 May 1976	TR1733668230; 51°22′17″N 1°07′16″E		1085008	Upload Photo	
East Cliff House	II	1, Central Parade			14 May 1976	TR1823468390; 51°22′21″N 1°08′03″E		1085002	Upload Photo	
Eastern Part of No 109	II	109, 110, Central Parade			14 May 1976	TR1750268302; 51°22′20″N 1°07′25″E		1085007	Upload Photo	
Dolphin Court	II	110, Central Parade			14 May 1976	TR1745068282; 51°22′19″N 1°07′22″E		1115420	Upload Photo	
The Ship Inn	II	17, Central Parade			29 September 1951	TR1815268412; 51°22′22″N 1°07′59″E		1085003	Upload Photo	
27-35, Central Parade	II	27-35, Central Parade			29 September 1951	TR1807268388; 51°22′22″N 1°07′55″E		1115456	Upload Photo	
36, Central Parade	II	36, Central Parade			14 May 1976	TR1800268387; 51°22′22″N 1°07′51″E		1085005	Upload Photo	
North and South School Rooms North School Room South School Room	II	7, Central Parade			14 May 1976	TR1786168148; 51°22′14″N 1°07′43″E		1084955	Upload Photo	
Fordwich House	II	34, Charles Street			14 May 1976	TR1800268358; 51°22′21″N 1°07′51″E		1336836	Upload Photo	
6-16, Charles Street	II	6-16, Charles Street			14 May 1976	TR1788868352; 51°22′21″N 1°07′45″E		1320430	Upload Photo	
Seasalter Old Church	II	Church Lane			30 March 1951	TR0932464742; 51°20′36″N 1°00′15″E		1084929	Upload Photo	
Church of All Saints	II*	Church Street			30 March 1951	TR1173966248; 51°21′21″N 1°02′23″E	Perpendicular SW tower, C14 N aisle arcade of four bays	1084932	Church of All Saints More images	Q17556995
Monument Public House	II	Church Street			20 May 1977	TR1177766308; 51°21′23″N 1°02′25″E		1084930	Upload Photo	
The Old Parsonage	II	Church Street			30 March 1951	TR1188666176; 51°21′18″N 1°02′30″E		1084931	Upload Photo	
Walter Goodsall Burial Enclosure at All Saints Churchyard	II	Church Street			31 October 1997	TR1176766195; 51°21′19″N 1°02′24″E	+1913, low enclosure of flint and brick, gates Art Nouveau	1244860	Upload Photo	
War memorial in the churchyard of the Church of All Saints	II	Church Street			1 March 2016	TR1170866249; 51°21′21″N 1°02′21″E		1433273	Upload Photo	
Wynn Ellis Mausoleum at All Saints Churchyard	II	Church Street			31 October 1997	TR1169966260; 51°21′21″N 1°02′21″E	1875 by Charls Barry Jun., a late example of classical Primitivism	1244859	Upload Photo	
Fern Cottage	II	14, Church Street			20 May 1977	TR1171666339; 51°21′24″N 1°02′22″E		1336876	Upload Photo	
Meadow Croft	II	34, Church Street			30 March 1951	TR1180366302; 51°21′23″N 1°02′26″E		1336877	Upload Photo	
Pye Alley Farmhouse	II	Clapham Hill			20 May 1977	TR1076763641; 51°19′58″N 1°01′27″E		1336878	Upload Photo	
Roman Catholic Church of Our Lady of the Sacred Heart	II	Clarence Road			19 February 2014	TR1693168053; 51°22′12″N 1°06′55″E		1417650	Upload Photo	
Yorkletts Farmhouse	II	Dargate Road			20 May 1977	TR0903363036; 51°19′41″N 0°59′56″E		1084933	Upload Photo	
Grosvenor House	II	2, East Street			14 May 1976	TR1813368388; 51°22′21″N 1°07′58″E		1085009	Upload Photo	
Norfolk House	II	4, East Street			14 May 1976	TR1813468381; 51°22′21″N 1°07′58″E		1115405	Upload Photo	
Willowdene	II	Forge Lane			20 May 1977	TR1067065764; 51°21′07″N 1°01′27″E		1084935	Upload Photo	
1, Forge Lane	II	1, Forge Lane			20 May 1977	TR1064665800; 51°21′08″N 1°01′25″E		1278050	Upload Photo	
Ellenden Farmhouse	II	Fox Cross Road			20 May 1977	TR0974163015; 51°19′39″N 1°00′33″E		1106257	Upload Photo	
Millstrood Farmhouse	II	18, Golden Hill			20 May 1977	TR1160765384; 51°20′53″N 1°02′14″E		1084936	Upload Photo	
Sewer Vent Column	II	Grand Drive			23 March 2000	TR1599568110; 51°22′15″N 1°06′07″E		1380179	Upload Photo	
The Old Cottage	II	125, Grand Drive			14 May 1976	TR1604667920; 51°22′09″N 1°06′09″E		1085010	Upload Photo	
Greenhill Farmhouse	II	Greenhill Road			14 May 1976	TR1642567204; 51°21′46″N 1°06′27″E		1115152	Upload Photo	
Old West View Home	II	109, Greenhill Road			14 May 1976	TR1613866857; 51°21′35″N 1°06′11″E		1085011	Upload Photo	
1-6, Hanover Square	II	1-6, Hanover Square			29 September 1951	TR1782968176; 51°22′15″N 1°07′42″E		1336838	Upload Photo	
Duke of Cumberland Hotel	II	Harbour Street			20 May 1977	TR1063466709; 51°21′37″N 1°01′27″E		1084937	Upload Photo	
16, Harbour Street	II	16, Harbour Street			20 May 1977	TR1067566813; 51°21′41″N 1°01′29″E		1336881	Upload Photo	
Number 29 Tudor Restaurant and Number 30	II	29, Harbour Street			20 May 1977	TR1064866747; 51°21′39″N 1°01′28″E		1106229	Upload Photo	
33, Harbour Street	II	33, Harbour Street			20 May 1977	TR1065166706; 51°21′37″N 1°01′28″E		1106373	Upload Photo	
50 and 51, Harbour Street	II	50 and 51, Harbour Street			23 December 1975	TR1069766804; 51°21′40″N 1°01′30″E		1084938	Upload Photo	
56, Harbour Street	II	56, Harbour Street			20 May 1977	TR1070266826; 51°21′41″N 1°01′31″E		1084939	Upload Photo	
Hawthorn Cottages	II	1 and 2, Hawthorn Cottages			14 May 1976	TR2113267263; 51°21′41″N 1°10′30″E		1085034	Upload Photo	
Baptist Church Including the Parish Room	II	High Street			14 May 1976	TR1776468244; 51°22′17″N 1°07′38″E		1336862	Upload Photo	
Bear and Key Hotel	II	1 and 3, High Street			20 May 1977	TR1065066695; 51°21′37″N 1°01′28″E		1106379	Upload Photo	
115, High Street	II	115, High Street			20 May 1977	TR1070366349; 51°21′26″N 1°01′30″E		1084940	Upload Photo	
148 and 150, High Street	II	148 and 150, High Street			14 May 1976	TR1787168219; 51°22′16″N 1°07′44″E		1084976	Upload Photo	
Royal Naval Reserve Public House	II	28 and 30, High Street			20 May 1977	TR1063666623; 51°21′35″N 1°01′27″E		1084942	Upload Photo	
6, High Street	II	6, High Street			20 May 1977	TR1062666677; 51°21′36″N 1°01′26″E		1325939	Upload Photo	
8-12, High Street	II	8-12, High Street			20 May 1977	TR1062466666; 51°21′36″N 1°01′26″E		1084941	Upload Photo	
Gas Lantern and Column to Rear of No 68 High Street	II	68, High Street, Knight Alley			20 May 1977	TR1065166508; 51°21′31″N 1°01′27″E		1106358	Upload Photo	
Sewer Vent Column	II	Highview Avenue			23 March 2000	TR1593268125; 51°22′16″N 1°06′03″E		1380178	Upload Photo	
Royal Native Oyster Stores	II	Horsbridge Road			9 April 1990	TR1056266774; 51°21′40″N 1°01′23″E		1084921	Upload Photo	
Slipway to West of Royal Native Oyster Stores	II	Horsbridge Road			9 April 1990	TR1053666786; 51°21′40″N 1°01′22″E		1084922	Upload Photo	
The Vines	II	48, Island Wall			20 May 1977	TR1043866520; 51°21′32″N 1°01′16″E		1106354	Upload Photo	
Longwalk Smithereens	II	65, Island Wall			20 May 1977	TR1045466459; 51°21′30″N 1°01′17″E		1336882	Upload Photo	
86, Island Wall	II	86, Island Wall			20 May 1977	TR1037666418; 51°21′28″N 1°01′13″E		1084943	Upload Photo	
Church of St Bartholomew	II	King Edward Avenue			14 May 1976	TR1878267865; 51°22′04″N 1°08′30″E		1084977	Upload Photo	
Sutton Cottage	II	6, Little Charles Street			14 May 1976	TR1793068330; 51°22′20″N 1°07′47″E		1145833	Upload Photo	
1, Little Charles Street, 22 Charles Street	II	1, Little Charles Street, 22 Charles Street			29 September 1951	TR1793268358; 51°22′21″N 1°07′47″E		1084978	Upload Photo	
Sunset Caravans Limited Thirst Cottage	II	Long Reach Close			20 May 1977	TR1029264662; 51°20′32″N 1°01′05″E		1084944	Upload Photo	
2 Cannon	II	9, Marine Parade (Opposite)			20 May 1977	TR1159167227; 51°21′53″N 1°02′17″E		1106364	Upload Photo	
The Old Neptune Public House	II	Marine Terrace			20 May 1977	TR1037066525; 51°21′32″N 1°01′13″E		1084945	Upload Photo	
Sewer Vent Column	II	Mickleburgh Hill			23 March 2000	TR1879267793; 51°22′01″N 1°08′30″E		1380175	Upload Photo	
Gas Lantern and Column at Corner of Beach Alley	II	Middle Wall			20 May 1977	TR1059666611; 51°21′34″N 1°01′25″E		1336883	Upload Photo	
Rosedene	II	116, Middle Wall			20 May 1977	TR1064966383; 51°21′27″N 1°01′27″E		1084946	Upload Photo	
Rye Upholstery Works	II	124, Middle Wall			20 May 1977	TR1064766347; 51°21′26″N 1°01′27″E		1106352	Upload Photo	
The Wall Tavern	II	82 and 84, Middle Wall			20 May 1977	TR1062366472; 51°21′30″N 1°01′26″E		1106337	Upload Photo	
Little Millstrood	II	128, Millstrood Road			20 May 1977	TR1177965451; 51°20′55″N 1°02′23″E		1336884	Upload Photo	
85, Mortimer Street	II	85, Mortimer Street			14 May 1976	TR1782268310; 51°22′19″N 1°07′41″E		1084985	Upload Photo	
87, Mortimer Street	II	87, Mortimer Street			14 May 1976	TR1782968311; 51°22′19″N 1°07′42″E		1084986	Upload Photo	
Beaufort House Hamilton House Oxenden House	II	Oxenden Street			14 May 1976	TR1711568108; 51°22′14″N 1°07′04″E		1084987	Upload Photo	
Montague House	II	Oxenden Street			14 May 1976	TR1711068132; 51°22′15″N 1°07′04″E		1145868	Upload Photo	
Foresters Hall	II	Oxford Street			20 May 1977	TR1068966317; 51°21′25″N 1°01′29″E		1106297	Upload Photo	
Whitstable War Memorial	II	Oxford Street			6 March 2018	TR1068866186; 51°21′20″N 1°01′28″E		1453036	Upload Photo	
1-5, Oxford Street	II	1-5, Oxford Street			20 May 1977	TR1069866329; 51°21′25″N 1°01′29″E		1084948	Upload Photo	
Coach and Horses Public House	II	37, Oxford Street			20 May 1977	TR1070866176; 51°21′20″N 1°01′29″E		1084949	Upload Photo	
54, Oxford Street	II	54, Oxford Street			20 May 1977	TR1067866155; 51°21′19″N 1°01′28″E		1336904	Upload Photo	
5A, 7 and 9, Oxford Street	II	5A, 7 and 9, Oxford Street			20 May 1977	TR1068866313; 51°21′25″N 1°01′29″E		1336885	Upload Photo	
61, Oxford Street	II	61, Oxford Street			20 May 1977	TR1075466113; 51°21′18″N 1°01′32″E		1084906	Upload Photo	
68, Oxford Street	II	68, Oxford Street			20 May 1977	TR1070766106; 51°21′18″N 1°01′29″E		1084907	Upload Photo	
70, Oxford Street	II	70, Oxford Street			20 May 1977	TR1071966097; 51°21′17″N 1°01′30″E		1084908	Upload Photo	
76, Oxford Street	II	76, Oxford Street			20 May 1977	TR1075066060; 51°21′16″N 1°01′31″E		1336905	Upload Photo	
Court Lees Manor	II	Pean Hill			30 March 1951	TR1110763367; 51°19′49″N 1°01′44″E		1084909	Upload Photo	
Kent House	II	1, Pound Lane			14 May 1976	TR1808468387; 51°22′22″N 1°07′55″E		1085004	Upload Photo	
Bay View Marine View	II	Prospect Hill			29 September 1951	TR1811368395; 51°22′22″N 1°07′57″E		1145871	Upload Photo	
Barn to North East of Rayham Farm	II	Rayham Road			20 May 1977	TR1256965723; 51°21′03″N 1°03′05″E		1084912	Upload Photo	
Church of St Mary the Virgin	II	Reculver Lane			14 May 1975	TR2122468039; 51°22′06″N 1°10′37″E		1318906	Upload Photo	
Forge House	II	Reculver Lane			14 May 1976	TR2105867983; 51°22′04″N 1°10′28″E		1084988	Upload Photo	
Railings, Gatepiers and Gates at Elliott House	II	Reculver Road			13 March 1998	TR1917267628; 51°21′55″N 1°08′50″E		1119678	Upload Photo	
Reculver War Memorial	II	Reculver Road			9 October 2009	TR2118268049; 51°22′06″N 1°10′34″E		1393473	Upload Photo	
Sewer Vent Column	II	Reculver Road			23 March 2000	TR1902167439; 51°21′50″N 1°08′41″E		1380174	Upload Photo	
St Mary's Cottage	II	Reculver Road			14 May 1976	TR2108368011; 51°22′05″N 1°10′29″E		1336864	Upload Photo	
Elliott House	II	22, Reculver Road			13 March 1998	TR1921767598; 51°21′54″N 1°08′52″E		1119677	Upload Photo	
The Grange	II	70, Reculver Road			29 September 1951	TR1949567937; 51°22′05″N 1°09′07″E		1336865	Upload Photo	
Sycamore Lodge	II	91, Reculver Road			14 May 1976	TR1946067984; 51°22′07″N 1°09′05″E		1145884	Upload Photo	
Rayham Farm	II	Ryham Road			30 March 1951	TR1254065705; 51°21′02″N 1°03′03″E		1336907	Upload Photo	
Gas Lantern and Column at Junction With Kent Street	II	Saddelton Road			20 May 1977	TR1060365759; 51°21′07″N 1°01′23″E		1336908	Upload Photo	
Westbrook Farmhouse	II	Sea Street			14 May 1976	TR1578667363; 51°21′52″N 1°05′54″E		1084992	Upload Photo	
15, Sea Street	II	15, Sea Street			20 May 1977	TR1066266861; 51°21′42″N 1°01′29″E		1084913	Upload Photo	
The Retreat	II	3, Sea Street			14 May 1976	TR1691568057; 51°22′12″N 1°06′54″E		1186749	Upload Photo	
Hinkley	II	40, Sea Street			14 May 1976	TR1682967981; 51°22′10″N 1°06′49″E		1336868	Upload Photo	
2 Stores to North East of Sea View Bungalow	II	Sea Wall			13 July 1964	TR1064266880; 51°21′43″N 1°01′28″E		1107850	Upload Photo	
2 Stores to Rear of Lionel Cottage	II	Sea Wall			13 July 1964	TR1065266881; 51°21′43″N 1°01′28″E		1336870	Upload Photo	
6 Fisherman's Stores (Rear and Side of the Boat House)	II	Sea Wall			13 July 1964	TR1066666887; 51°21′43″N 1°01′29″E		1084916	Upload Photo	
Beach Cottage	II	Sea Wall			20 May 1977	TR1059266815; 51°21′41″N 1°01′25″E		1084914	Upload Photo	
Ocean Cottage	II	Sea Wall			20 May 1977	TR1058766799; 51°21′40″N 1°01′25″E		1336869	Upload Photo	
Sea View House and Sea View Bungalow	II	Sea Wall			20 May 1977	TR1063566869; 51°21′43″N 1°01′27″E		1107872	Upload Photo	
The Pearsons Arms Public House	II	Sea Wall			20 May 1977	TR1057466747; 51°21′39″N 1°01′24″E		1325192	Upload Photo	
Brooklands Cottage Brooklands Farmhouse	II	South Street			20 May 1977	TR1244865016; 51°20′40″N 1°02′57″E		1120914	Upload Photo	
18-20, St Georges Terrace, 1-15 St Georges Terrace	II	18-20, St Georges Terrace, 1-15 St Georges Terrace			14 May 1976	TR1711068214; 51°22′17″N 1°07′04″E		1084989	Upload Photo	
Church of St John the Baptist	II	Swalecliff Court Drive			28 September 2012	TR1357767299; 51°21′52″N 1°04′00″E		1410894	Upload Photo	
24, Swanfield Road	II	24, Swanfield Road			20 May 1977	TR1082365983; 51°21′14″N 1°01′35″E		1084917	Upload Photo	
Colewood Farmhouse	II	Thanet Way			29 September 1951	TR1484166990; 51°21′41″N 1°05′05″E		1186756	Upload Photo	
Ruckinge Farmhouse	II	Thornden Wood Road			14 May 1976	TR1536965534; 51°20′53″N 1°05′29″E		1336886	Upload Photo	
The Share and Coulter Public House	II	Thornden Wood Road			14 May 1976	TR1561766071; 51°21′10″N 1°05′43″E		1084993	Upload Photo	
Tinkers Thatch	II	Thornden Wood Road			14 May 1976	TR1530065015; 51°20′36″N 1°05′24″E		1084950	Upload Photo	
Great Ruckinge Farm Cottage	II	Thornen Woo Road			14 May 1976	TR1532865547; 51°20′53″N 1°05′27″E		1336887	Upload Photo	
Tankerton Castle	II	Tower Hill			20 May 1977	TR1136067174; 51°21′51″N 1°02′05″E		1121141	Upload Photo	
The Cottage	II	Underdown Lane			14 May 1976	TR1786066980; 51°21′36″N 1°07′40″E		1336888	Upload Photo	
The Old Coach House at Underdown House	II	Underdown Lane			9 May 1975	TR1786766990; 51°21′37″N 1°07′41″E		1084953	Upload Photo	
Tithe Barn to South West of Underdown House	II	Underdown Lane			29 September 1951	TR1783466929; 51°21′35″N 1°07′39″E		1084952	Upload Photo	
Underdown House	II*	Underdown Lane			29 September 1951	TR1787866959; 51°21′36″N 1°07′41″E		1084951	Underdown House	
Gas Lantern and Column Outside No 4	II	4, Waterloo Road			20 May 1977	TR1051966547; 51°21′32″N 1°01′21″E		1084919	Upload Photo	
5 and 6, Waterloo Road	II	5 and 6, Waterloo Road			20 May 1977	TR1052666538; 51°21′32″N 1°01′21″E		1121156	Upload Photo	
7, Waterloo Road	II	7, Waterloo Road			20 May 1977	TR1053266536; 51°21′32″N 1°01′21″E		1084920	Upload Photo	
Studds Farmhouse	II	Whistable Road			29 September 1951	TR1500867183; 51°21′47″N 1°05′14″E		1336850	Upload Photo	
Christ Church Herne Bay Parish Church	II	William Street			14 May 1976	TR1787368133; 51°22′14″N 1°07′44″E		1336851	Upload Photo	
North Walsh Water's Edge	II	William Street			14 May 1976	TR1821468412; 51°22′22″N 1°08′02″E		1115486	Upload Photo	
Queen's Head Public House	II	William Street			14 May 1976	TR1781968046; 51°22′11″N 1°07′41″E		1336852	Upload Photo	
17, William Street	II	17, William Street			7 August 1987	TR1785768287; 51°22′19″N 1°07′43″E		1248343	Upload Photo	
39-43, William Street	II	39-43, William Street			14 May 1976	TR1786468185; 51°22′15″N 1°07′43″E		1084954	Upload Photo	
49-59, William Street	II	49-59, William Street			14 May 1976	TR1785868112; 51°22′13″N 1°07′43″E		1084956	Upload Photo	
24, York Road	II	24, York Road			14 May 1976	TR1682367995; 51°22′11″N 1°06′49″E		1084957	Upload Photo	
26, York Road	II	26, York Road			14 May 1976	TR1682567986; 51°22′10″N 1°06′49″E		1087063	Upload Photo	

== See also ==
- Grade I listed buildings in Kent
- Grade II* listed buildings in Kent

== Sources ==
- Newman, John (2013) [1969], Kent: North-East and East, The Buildings of England, New Haven and London: Yale University Press, ISBN 978-0-300-18506-5
