= The Follies Trust =

Architectural conservation organisation in Ireland

- Formation: 2006
- Type: Non-governmental organisation
- Purpose: Historic preservation and conservation
- Location: Belfast, Northern Ireland
- Chairperson: Primrose Wilson
- Website: follies-trust.org

The Follies Trust is an architectural conservation and preservation organisation established in 2006 with a focus on follies. The trust operates in both the Republic of Ireland and Northern Ireland.

The organisation is registered as a charity in Northern Ireland.

The trust has restored more than thirty buildings with folly elements over the past 20 years across the island of Ireland.

The organisation provides direct funding and repair services as well as partnering with other bodies to provide information, expertise and funding.

== Notable projects ==
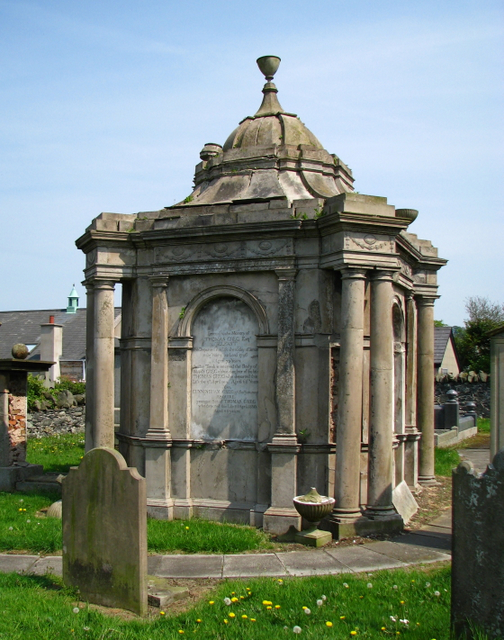
Mausoleum of Thomas Greg, Knockbreda Cemetery, Belfast in 2009 prior to restoration by the trust.

Notable projects include the repair of the arches and obelisks at Gloster House and restoring the pyramid at Maudlins Cemetery in Naas, County Kildare.

== See also ==
- Irish Landmark Trust
- Mausolea and Monuments Trust
- Hearth Historic Buildings Trust
