= Central Catholic Library =

Coordinates: 53°20′20″N 6°15′2″W

- Leabharlann an Chreidimh
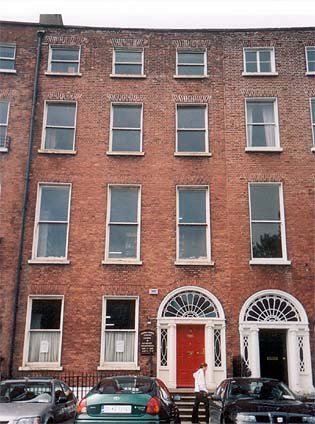
- The Library
- Location: 74 Merrion Square, Dublin 2, Ireland
- Type: Religious
- Established: 1922

The Central Catholic Library (Irish: Leabharlann an Chreidimh) is a library located in Dublin, Ireland. It was founded by Fr. Stephen Brown, SJ on 25 June 1922 with the purpose of facilitating the laity to educate themselves on all Catholic matters. It is a voluntary subscription library (one of two remaining subscription libraries remaining on the island of Ireland) and is open to visitors and members two and a half days per week. It has a lending section, a reference/reading section and several collections over several floors of the building. It is located at 74 Merrion Square, Dublin 2.

== History ==
The Library was founded by Fr. Stephen Brown in 1922. From the outset, it provided reading rooms which were open seven days a week from 11 am. to 10 pm. Four daily newspapers were provided as well as Catholic weeklies from England, USA, Canada, Argentina, New Zealand, Australia and South Africa.

The library is located in a Georgian house on Merrion Square which was built around 1790 and originally formed part of the Fitzwilliam Estate.

The facilities of the reading rooms were provided free of charge and were readily availed of by people from all walks of life. Members of all denominations were welcomed – a policy which still prevails.

The Library continued to grow and expand over the following years, but on 9 March 1932 disaster struck: a serious fire destroyed the garage underneath the Reading Room. The Library suffered severely as the floor of the Lending Department became unsafe and the windows and doors were destroyed.

Two valuable collections, the Healy Collection and the Works on Sacred Art and Archaeology, were almost completely destroyed either by fire or water. The Library was forced to close for two months.

Soon the time came to consider a move to a bigger premises to cope with the demand for its services. A number of vacant houses were visited and inspected for suitability. The decision to purchase the house on Merrion Square was made in the autumn of 1933. This is the current home of the Library.

In June 2016, a proposal by the Library's Board to move its holdings from its Merrion Square location to a secular university sparked opposition from many of its members, 50 of whom held a protest outside its premises. A source at the Library cited poor visiting figures and insufficient finances to conserve the Library's collections as the reason behind the move, while those who are uneasy about the proposal believe that it would be against the ethos of the organisation to hand over a Catholic library to a secular university. The library’s AGM was due to be held on 22 June but was postponed “for a number of reasons”, according to the company secretary David McEllin.

After the AGM in September, on 24 October six board members of the library resigned in protest over the decision to reject a take-over proposal from Dublin City University. Those who resigned from the 18-person board were Fr Brendan Comerford (treasurer), Frank Litton, Felix Larkin, Peter Costello (honorary librarian), Michael Sheehy and Tony White. The chairperson of the library, Edel Purcell, insisted that they were not in a state of crisis, and that she believed the library will secure funding from other sources.

== Collections ==
The Library now has approximately 70,000 books covering a broad range of subjects from the role of women in the Church to the natural environment, including some old books dating back to the 16th century. It also has a large collection of periodicals and pamphlets.

Stephen Brown Research and Reference Library

This, the main reading room, has sections on Christology, the Old and New Testament, the Fathers of the Church, moral theology, literature (in particular that of Ireland, England, France, Italy and Spain), philosophy, Marian Studies, history, church music, and the religious orders. There is a selection of current periodical titles, from Ireland, the UK, France and the US, including several Catholic newspapers.

Art Library

This holds books which came to the Library from the Academy of Christian Art and other sources, to which was added a valuable donation of books on modern and non-European art by a member of the board of the Chester Beatty Library.

The Irish Room This holds a large collection covering many aspects of Irish History, both religious and secular.

Carnegie Collection

This collection is on permanent loan from the Library Council of Ireland. The books cover the areas of philosophy, religion and sociology. They are shelved separately from the core collections, and contain many books dealing with non-Catholic traditions, including Anglican, Presbyterian, Methodist and other denominational groups. There are also books on the non-Christian World religions, including Judaism, Buddhism and Islam.

Leo Room

This room holds the remnants of the collection of the Leo Guild (founded in May 1913), whose premises were destroyed by fire during the Civil War. Most of the Library's books on sociology and politics are housed here.

Jerome Room

This holds a collection of approximately 1,200 books printed before 1850, with the earliest titles going back to the sixteenth century.

Kavanagh Room

This holds the collection of Bishop Kavanagh, which he donated to the Library. It also contains books left to the Library by the late Monsignor Stephen Greene.

Pamphlets

The Library holds a substantial collection of pamphlets. These include publications by the Catholic Truth Society of Ireland and the Irish Messenger Office, as well as statements issued in pamphlet form by the Irish bishops.

== Unique classification system ==
The Library is notable for the classification scheme, drawn up by its founder, Fr. Stephen Brown, S.J.. This scheme facilitates the classification of books on a wide range of topics relating to Catholic and other Christian denominations more comprehensively than a general-use system such as Dewey Decimal Classification.

The system has been expanded in recent years to include contemporary issues such as the environment (33B), and refugees and asylum seekers (33C).

== Events ==
As well as hosting talks and exhibitions, the library has participated in a number of annual events such as Heritage Week and Culture Night.

== See also ==
- List of libraries in the Republic of Ireland
