= All Saints Church, Whitstable =

Church in Whitstable, Kent, England

Coordinates: 51.3558°N 1.0397°E

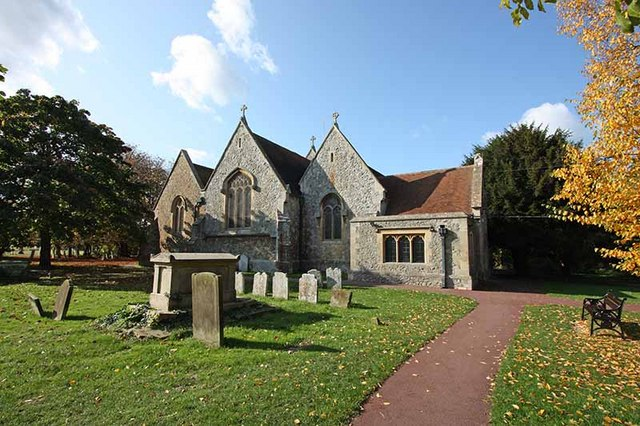
All Saints Church

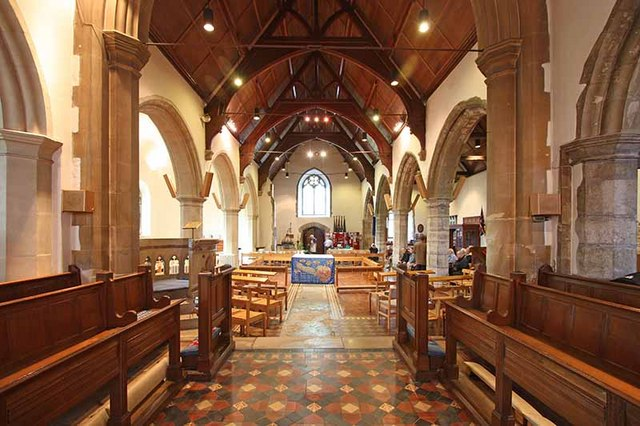
Interior

All Saints Church is a Church of England church in Whitstable, Kent. It is one of five Church of England churches in the Whitstable Team Ministry.

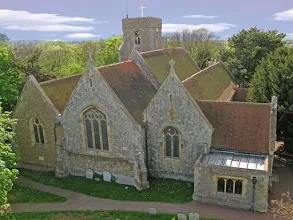
All Saints Whitstable

There has been a church on the site for at least 800 years, initially consisting of a chancel and nave. In the early 13th century a new church was built in the same simple form, the early English style of Gothic Architecture, and a tower was added. The north aisle was added in the 15th century. In the 1870s when the fabric became unsafe the church was almost rebuilt with the chancel enlarged and a vestry added. In 1962 the design was completed by the addition of a south aisle and west porch. The south wall of the nave was taken down and rebuilt to form the wall of the new aisle, still retaining the original stained glass windows. Arches and pillars were constructed to reflect those of the early 15th century on the north side of the nave. At the east end of the Nave Aisle there is a stone slab, from which the brass has been removed, in which the outline of a chalice is clearly visible, showing that it was the tomb of a priest. Only two other similar examples exist, both of them in north Kent. The tomb in unique in that it depicts the chalice only and no communion wafer. On the south wall is the oldest brass in the church, a memorial tablet to Thomas Brede, who died in 1444.

In the churchyard lies the Grade II listed tomb of Wynn Ellis, designed by Charles Barry Junior, built in 1875 and managed by the Mausolea and Monuments Trust.
