= Mausolea and Monuments Trust =

British charity

The Mausolea and Monuments Trust logo

The Mausolea and Monuments Trust is a charity for the "protection and preservation of mausolea and funerary monuments situated in Great Britain and Ireland." The trust was founded in 1997 by the architectural historian Jill Allibone (1932–1998). Tim Knox, then the director of the Soane Museum and the trust's first chairman, described it as “the dottiest conservation cause in the land”.

The trust has responsibility for six mausolea:

- The Bateman Mausoleum, Morley, Derbyshire
- The Heathcote Mausoleum, Hursley, Hampshire
- The Wynne Ellis Mausoleum, Whitstable, Kent
- The Nash Mausoleum, Farningham, Kent
- The Guise Mausoleum, Elmore, Gloucestershire
- The Boileau Mausoleum, Ketteringham, Norfolk

The trust publishes a regular journal titled Mausolus, and researches and maintains a gazetteer of mausolea in Great Britain and Ireland.

== See also ==
- The Follies Trust
