= Education in Congleton Borough =

Coordinates: 53.164°N 2.210°W

In Congleton Borough, there were many different provisions for children and young people ranging from pre-schooling to Colleges of Further education. The nearest Area Education Office County Offices were in the neighbouring Borough of Macclesfield. As of 1 April 2009, responsibility for education in the former borough of Congleton passed to the new unitary authority of Cheshire East.

== Pre-schools & Nurseries ==
=== Alsager ===
There are 19 Pre-schools & Nurseries in Alsager.

== Primary schools ==
=== Alsager ===
There are 5 Primary Schools in Alsager.

- Alsager Highfields Community School
- Cranberry Infant and Junior school
- Excalibur Primary School
- Pikemere School
- St Gabriel's Catholic Primary School

=== Congleton ===
There are 9 primary schools in Congleton

- Astbury St Mary's C of E Primary School
- Black Firs Primary School
- Buglawton Primary School
- Daven Primary School
- Havannah Primary School
- Marlfields Primary School
- Mossley CE Primary School
- St Mary's Catholic Primary School
- The Quinta Primary School

=== Middlewich ===
At the start of the 21st century there were seven schools in Middlewich: one infant, one junior, four primary schools and one secondary school. Cledford Infant and Nursery and Cledford Junior schools primarily serve children from the south of the town. Middlewich Primary School caters for children from the older, northern, part of the town, whilst St Mary's Catholic Primary School receives Catholic children from the town. Byley Primary School and Wimboldsley Community Primary School serve children from outside the immediate bounds of the town.

=== Sandbach ===
There are three state primary schools in Sandbach town and 1 Independent primary school. There are additional schools parish of Sandbach

It was announced by Cheshire County Council, under the Transforming learning in Communities, that they were looking into reducing the number of surplus Primary school places in Sandbach and Congleton borough in general. With this report came the possibility of Primary school closures due under subscription of placements.

==== Sandbach Community Primary School ====
Sandbach Community Primary School
- Sandbach, Cheshire; England

Information
- Type: Primary school
- Local authority: Cheshire East Council
- Headteacher: Mrs Lynn Treadway
- Staff: 8 teachers and 8 assistants
- Gender: Mixed
- Age: 3 to 11
- Website: http://www.sandbach-pri.cheshire.sch.uk/

The School is currently a local Community Primary School, having previously been a Secondary Modern and the first State School in Sandbach. It has an active PTA. The School also offers many extra curricular activities with many residential trips being put on. The school has previously been under special measures and had since worked its way out of these. Sandbach Community Primary is currently home to Sandbach Baptist Church, the church has helped the school with its campaign against closure.

==== Offley Primary School ====
Offley Primary School
- Sandbach, Cheshire, CW11 1GY; England

Information
- Type: Primary school
- Local authority: Cheshire East Council
- Headteacher: Mrs Jenny Davies
- Gender: Mixed
- Age: 4 to 11
- Colour: Blue
- Publication: Offley Poem Book
- Website: http://www.school-portal.co.uk/Grouphomepage.asp?GroupId=277784

Offley Road School is a School in Sandbach with 349 pupils The School was Formed with the Amalgamation of An Infant and a Junior Schools.

According to the Schools latest Ofsted report from 1 May 2008. Offley is larger than the average primary school, Most pupils are White British and the proportion eligible for free schools meals is well below the national average. It also states that the school has the Investor in People award, and Activemark and Artsmark awards.

==== St John's CE Primary School ====
St John's CE Primary School
- Sandbach, Cheshire; England

Information
- Type: Primary school
- Local authority: Cheshire East Council
- Gender: Mixed
- Age: 4 to 11

This school is in Sandbach Heath and is a Voluntary aided Church of England School. Moreover, in 2009 there pupil number reach approximately 98.

==== Norfolk House School ====
Norfolk House School is an Independent all Girls School in Sandbach.

== Secondary schools ==
=== Alsager ===
Alsager School is situated opposite the Manchester Metropolitan University campus and is attended by over 1600 pupils from the local area.

=== Congleton ===
There are two Secondary Schools in Congleton.

- Congleton High School
- Eaton Bank Academy

=== Middlewich ===
Work began on the original buildings for the secondary school, Middlewich High School, in 1906, with later additions improving the teaching areas and providing a sports hall which could also be used by the wider community. The school opened on 1 November 1906. In 2007 it was ranked 34 out of 50 by GCSE results for schools in Cheshire in the 2007 league tables.

=== Sandbach ===
Sandbach School was founded as a Parish Charity school for boys in 1677. Now it is an Independent comprehensive boys school, with Charitable status, funded by Cheshire LEA but controlled by a board of governors. The school's motto is Ut Severis Seges meaning approximately "what you sow, so shall you reap" though literally meaning "You sow in order to reap". The school educates 985 pupils and the Sixth Form educates 185 pupils, and is still growing. The school has its own Combined Cadet Force (CCF). This is a cadet force in which all three British armed forces (Royal Navy, Army and Royal Air Force) are represented. On 4 September 2006 the School officially became a 'Specialist Arts College', this is partly the success of the school's theatre company (made up of its pupils and occasionally staff). This change has affected the ethos of the school; with a more direct focus on Art, music, dance and Cross curricular arts.

Within Sandbach there is also a comprehensive Girls school Sandbach High . It was originally the town's mixed Secondary Modern when Sandbach School served as the local Boys grammar school, but has been a single sex comprehensive since 1979.

== Colleges and universities ==
=== Manchester Metropolitan University ===
Alsager is home to the Contemporary Arts and Sports Science Departments of the Manchester Metropolitan University. The university absorbed the former Crewe & Alsager College of Higher Education, forming the Crewe and Alsager Faculty, now retitled MMU Cheshire. The Alsager Arts Centre is on campus, which promotes touring contemporary dance, music, theatre, live art, performance writing and visual art events to the public as well as members of the university community. The university will vacate the site in the next five years, relocating to the university's Crewe campus, and the land sold for development. As yet no firm plans have been released and the uncertainty is concerning residents and businesses.

== Education in Middlewich ==
There were three schools in Middlewich in the mid-19th century: the British School in Newton Bank; the National School in Cow Lane (Brooks Lane); and the Grammar School, close to the site of the Somerfields store. A Church of England school was erected in Lewin Street in 1854 and extended in 1871. It soon became known as the National School, with the result that the earlier school was demolished. The later National School was itself demolished in the 1980s and is the site of the Salinae Day Care Centre, opened in 1995. At the turn of the 20th century two new schools were built: St Mary's Catholic school, whose keystone was laid in 1899 by Col. France-Hayhurst, and the secondary school, opened by France-Hayhurst in 1906.
