= Sandbach Concert Series =

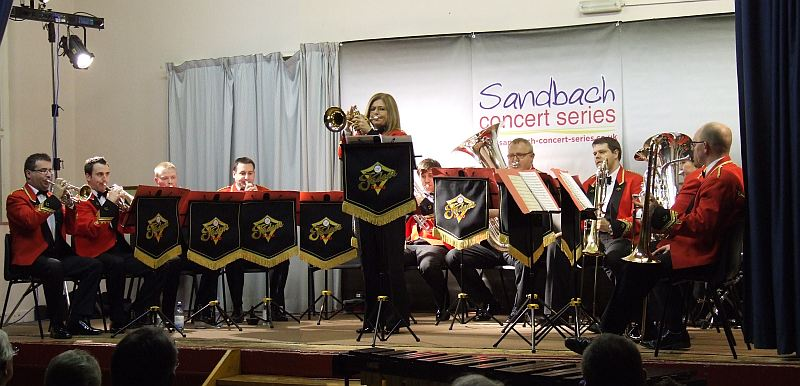
- Status: Active
- Genre: Music festival
- Frequency: Monthly (last Wed of the month, Sep-Nov, Feb-Jun)
- Locations: Sandbach, England
- Coordinates: 53.146°N 2.367°W
- Years active: 16
- Inaugurated: 29 September 2010
- Founder: Lauren Scott
- Attendance: ~150
- Capacity: 200
- Organiser: Sandbach Concert Series
- Filing status: Charity Number 1166321
- Sponsors: Arts Council England, Sandbach Town Council, Cheshire East Council, Sandbach Transport Festival, Rotary Club of Sandbach, Love Music Trust, KPI Recruiting, Sandbach Partnership, Sandbach Music, Astute Music, Nigel Birch
- Website: www.sandbach-concert-series.co.uk
- Artistic Director: Andy Scott; Spotlight Concert Director: Kevin Birch

The Sandbach Concert Series is a series of eight monthly concerts per year, that takes place in Sandbach, Cheshire. Each event begins with a Spotlight Concert that showcases a number of young musicians from local schools, before the main concert featuring professional musicians. There is also an art exhibition, and raffle raising money for charitable causes. There have been over 50 concerts to date.

== History ==
The Concert Series was conceived by harpist Lauren Scott and co-founded in 2010 with her husband, the composer and saxophonist Andy Scott as Musical Director. Following a presentation to the local Council in July 2010, funding was secured from Sandbach Town Council, Cheshire East Council, and Arts Council England with the National Lottery, and the first concert debuted on the evening of Wednesday 29 September 2010. The concert is non-profit making, and run by volunteers. In 2016, the organisation became a registered charity.

=== Sandbach Young Musician of the Year ===
In 2015, the Concert Series launched the Sandbach Young Musician of the Year, an annual competition "open to individual performers aged 19 and under who have performed at one of the Sandbach Concert Series Spotlight concerts during the previous calendar year". The first final was held on 18 April 2015 at Sandbach Town Hall during the annual Sandbach Transport Festival. The competition was won by Alex Flanders, with prizes awarded by Sandbach Mayor Elsie Alcock.

== Performers ==
Notable performers have included Craig Ogden, Chris Stout & Catriona McKay, Gwilym Simcock, Paul Edmund-Davies, Bramwell Tovey, Linda Richardson, and Tina May and pianist Nikki Ile.
