= Sandbach =

Market town and civil parish in Cheshire, England

Coordinates: 53.146°N 2.367°W

- Market town and civil parish
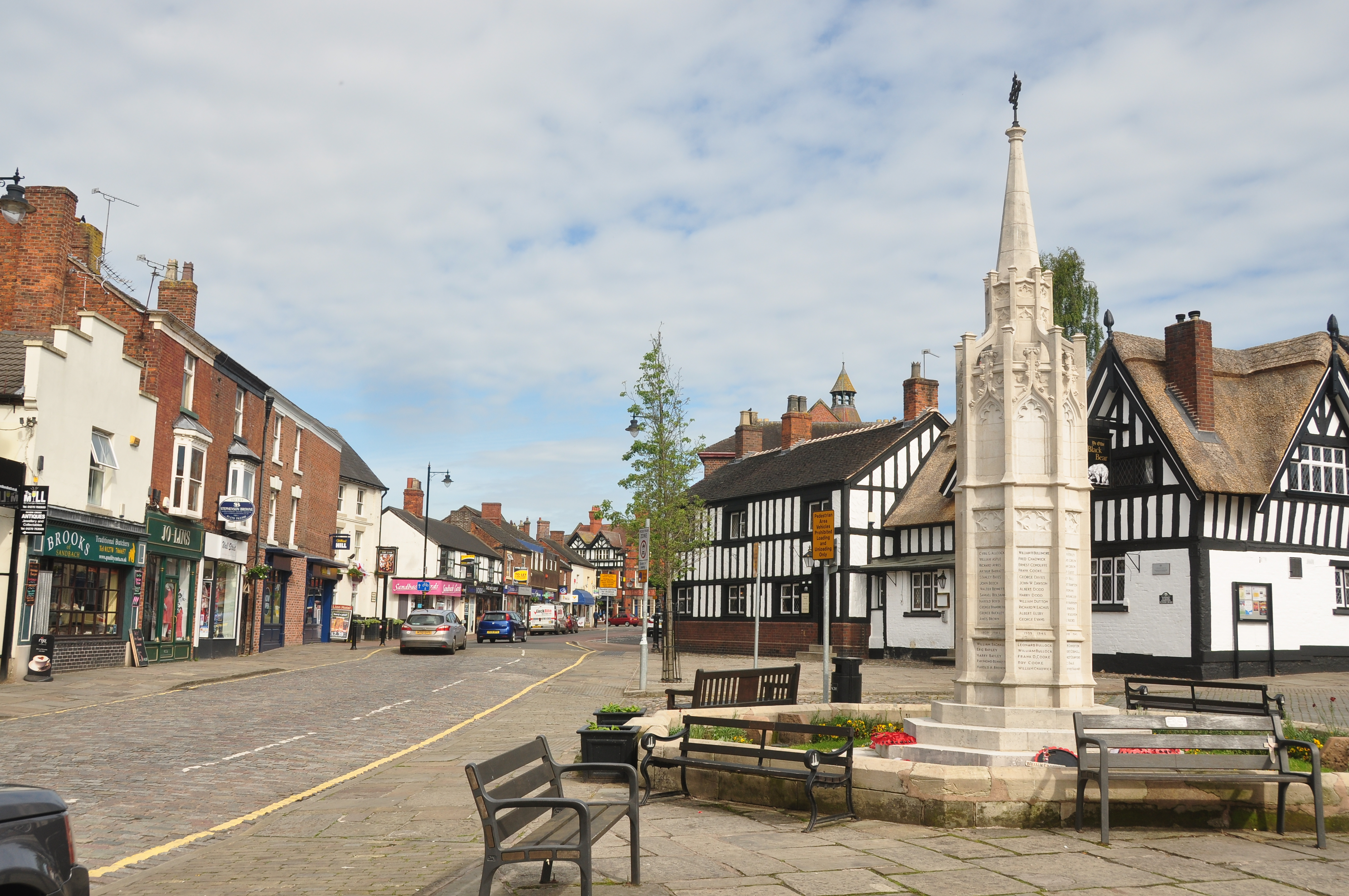
- Sandbach cobbles with half-timbered pubs, the war memorial and the Saxon crosses, 2014

- Location within Cheshire
- Area: 10.7 km^{2} (4.1 sq mi)
- Population: 21,916 (Parish, 2021); 11,290 (Built up area, 2021)
- OS grid reference: SJ755611
  - London: 158 mi (238 km) SE
- Civil parish: Sandbach
- Unitary authority: Cheshire East
- Ceremonial county: Cheshire
- Region: North West
- Country: England
- Sovereign state: United Kingdom
- Post town: SANDBACH
- Postcode district: CW11
- Dialling code: 01270
- Police: Cheshire
- Fire: Cheshire
- Ambulance: North West
- UK Parliament: Congleton

Sandbach (pronounced /ˈsændbætʃ/) is a market town and civil parish in the Cheshire East borough of Cheshire, England. The civil parish contains four settlements: Sandbach, Elworth, Ettiley Heath and Wheelock. At the 2021 census, the Sandbach built up area as defined by the Office for National Statistics had a population of 11,290 and the parish had a population of 21,916.

== History ==
Known as Sanbec in 1086, Sondbache (also Sondebache) in 1260, and Sandbitch in the 17th–18th centuries, Sandbach derives its name from the Anglo-Saxon sand bæce, which can mean "sand stream" or "sand valley". The modern German word Bach, with a similar origin as bæce, means "brook"; thus, the meaning of Sandbach can be understood correctly in German. In Germany, there are two places and several small waterways of that name (see German disambiguation page "Sandbach").

Traces of settlement are found in Sandbach from Saxon times, when the town was called Sanbec. Little is known about the town during this period, except that it was subjected to frequent Welsh and Danish raids. The town's inhabitants were converted to Christianity in the 7th century by four priests: Cedda, Adda, Betti and Diuma. The town has an entry in the Domesday Book from 1086, at which time it was sufficiently large to need a priest and a church. The entry states:

Sanbec: Bigot de Loges. 1 hide and 1½ virgates pay tax. Land for 2 ploughs. 1 Frenchman has ½ plough, 3 slaves. 2 villagers have ½ plough. Church. Woodland. Value TRE 4s; now 8s.

By the 13th century, during the reign of King John, much of the land around the township of Sandbach was owned by Richard de Sandbach who was the High Sheriff of Cheshire in 1230. Richard de Sandbach specifically owned a manor; he claimed an interest in the living of Sandbach. This claim against Earl Randle de Blundeville was unsuccessful. His son, John, however, was slightly more successful as he won an 'interest' temporarily against the Abbot of Dieulacres, only for it to be lost when it went to the King's Bench.

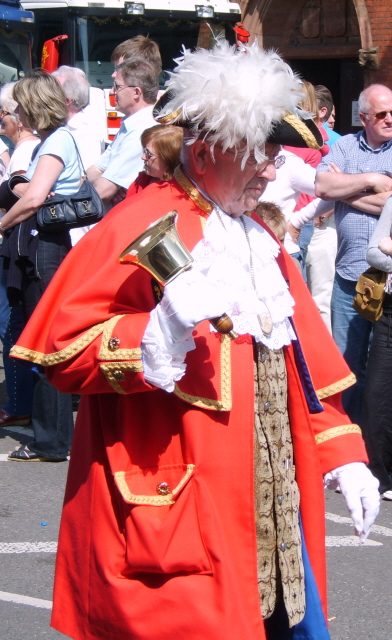
Sandbach Town Crier at Sandbach Transport Festival

The manor in Sandbach passed through numerous families, including the Leghs and Radclyffes. It was eventually bought by Sir Randulph (or Randle) Crewe, who became the Lord of the Manor.

Sandbach has been a market town since 1579, when it was granted a market charter by Elizabeth I following a petition from Sir John Radclyffe of Ordsall, the largest landowner in Sandbach and the owner of Sandbach Old Hall. He then encouraged the farmers of the area to hold a market in the town on Thursdays. The charter also allowed for right to establish a Court-leet and a Court of Pied-powder. The original charter is still preserved, and can be found in Chester. The charter also granted the town the right to hold two annual fairs, which lasted for two days, and were held around Easter and early September. The Thursday market is still held outdoors on Scotch Common, and in and around the town hall.

=== 17th century to present day ===
During the 17th century, the town used to be famous for its ale:

The ale brewed at this town was formerly in great repute in London, where, about the middle of the last century, it sold for twelve-pence a bottle, but it seems to be entirely supplanted by the Dorchester beer, and the Yorkshire and Welch ales, insomuch that we do not know of any Sandbach ale being now sold in the metropolis.

And about 1621 William Webb writes that "Our ale here at Sandbach being no less famous than that [at Derby] of a true nappe".

During the Wars of the Three Kingdoms, a Scottish army swept down into England before being forced to retreat at the Battle of Worcester. On 3 September 1651, the Sandbach summer fair was being held, and a Scottish army of around 1,000 exhausted cavalry men passed through the town under the command of David Leslie on their way back to Scotland. The town proved to be a difficult retreat route, however, as the people of Sandbach and the market stallholders attacked the Scottish army. A newspaper of the time said:

The dispute was very hot for two or three houres, and there were some townsmen hurt and two or three slaine, the Townesman slew about nine or ten and tooke 100 prisoners.

This was the only notable event of the Civil War to have happened in Sandbach. As the fair and the fight took place on the common of the town, after this event the common gained the name Scotch Common.

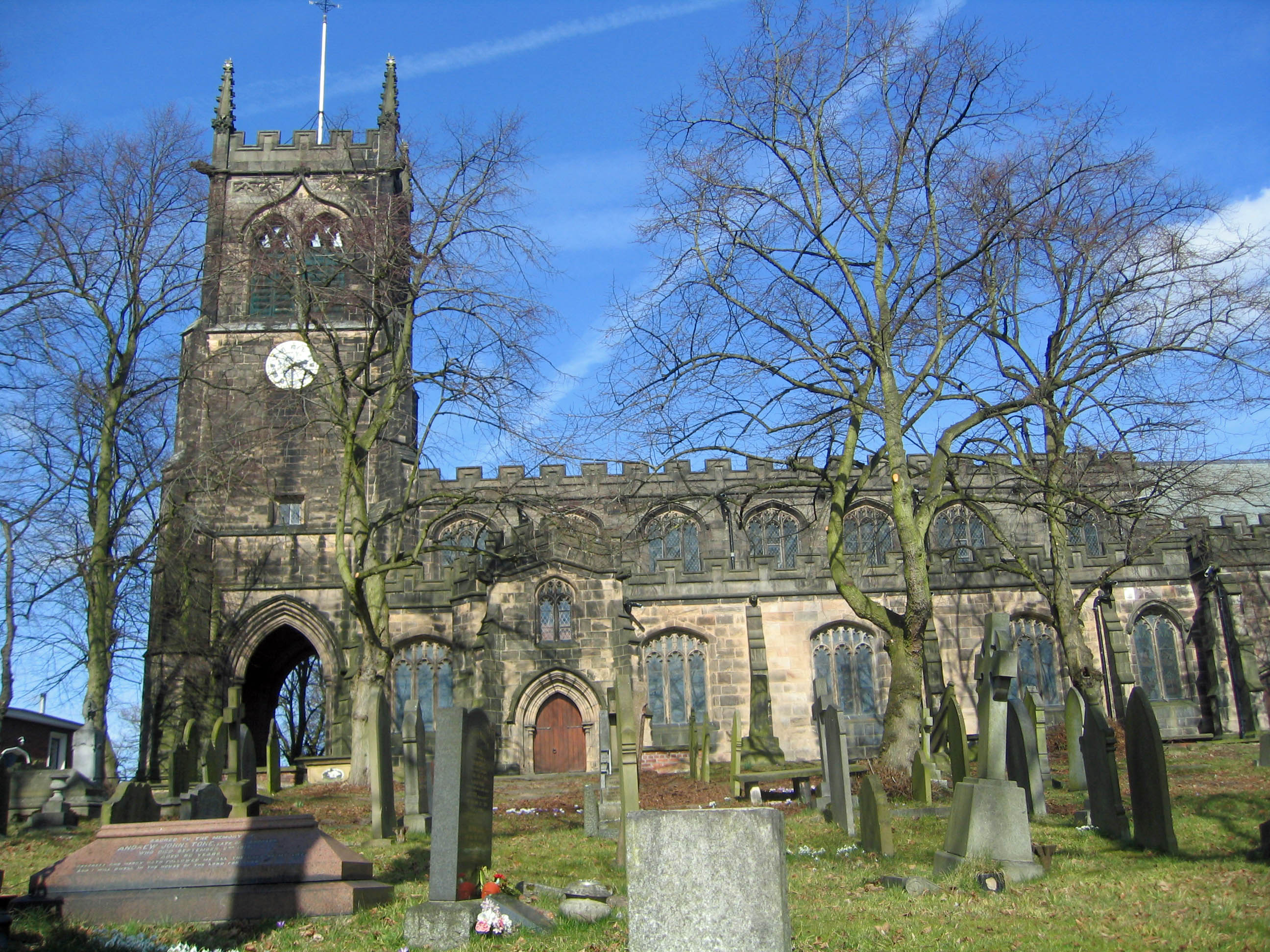
St Mary's Church: Largely rebuilt in the 1840s but incorporating some 15th-century material

In 1836 Sandbach silk mills employed 554 people, including 98 boys and girls under 12 years old.

Sandbach railway station opened in 1842 on the Manchester and Birmingham Railway. It lies 1.5 miles (2.4 km) west of the centre of Sandbach. When built, the station was in the neighbouring township of Elton, close to the borders with the townships of Sandbach and Bradwall. The small hamlet of Elworth adjoining the station grew significantly after the arrival of the railway. The Elworth area, including the station, was absorbed into urban district of Sandbach in 1936.

The Sandbach Corn Mill was a three-story brick building built in the late 19th century, on what is now Mill Hill Lane.

In 1933 the ERF lorry company was founded. In 1936 parts of the area of Bradwall, all of Elton and Wheelock were added, significantly increasing the size of the parish. The hamlets transferred from Bradwall were Boothlane Head, Brickhouses, Ettiley Heath, Forge Fields, Hindheath, Elworth and Marsh Green. By 1951 the population had reached 9,253.

During the Second World War, in Warship Week in December 1941 Sandbach adopted HMS Vimiera as its affiliated ship. The Vimiera was lost on 9 January 1942 when it was sunk by a mine in the Thames Estuary off East Spile Buoy with the loss of 96 hands.

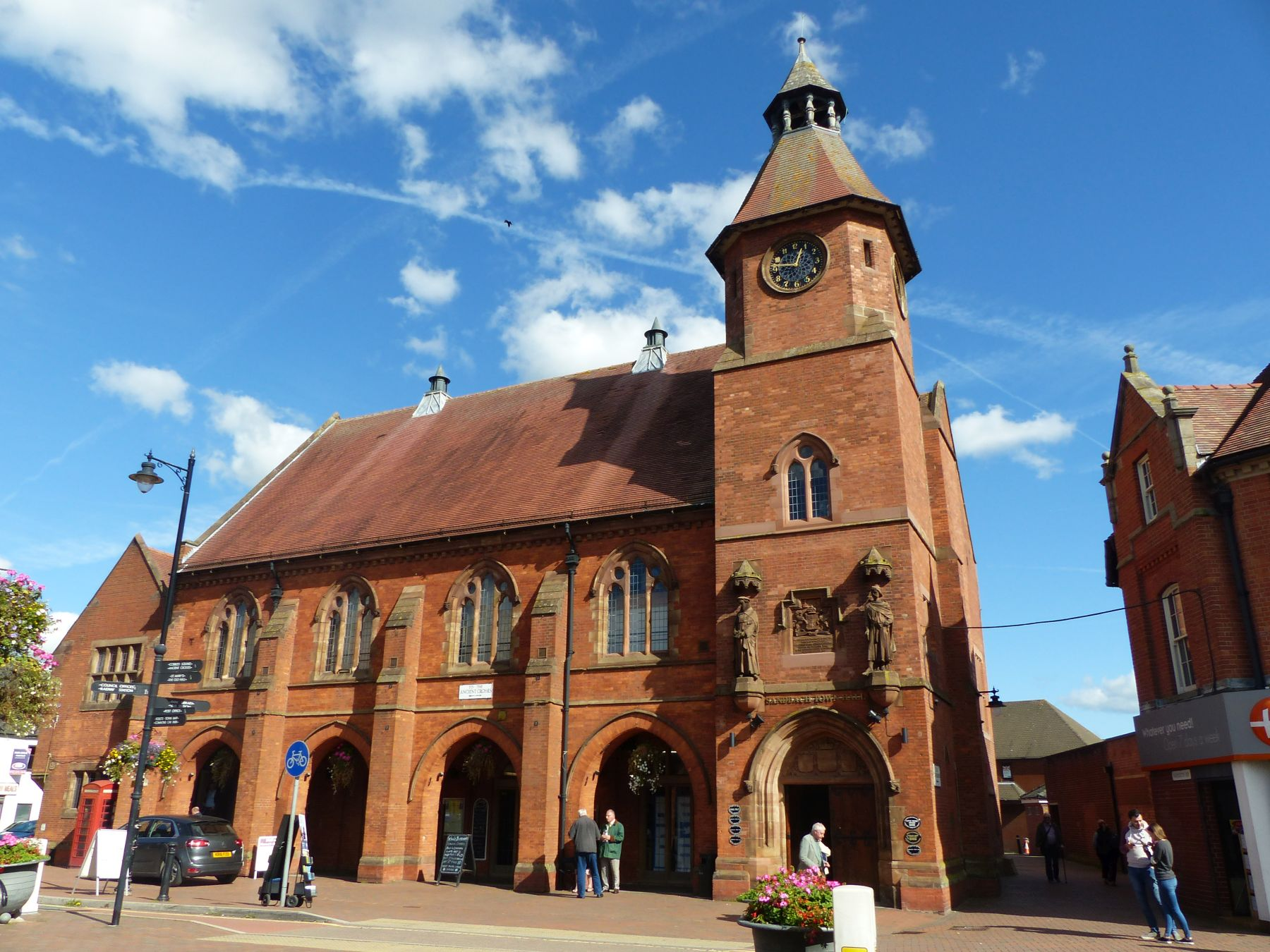
Sandbach Town Hall

== Governance ==
There are two tiers of local government covering Sandbach, at civil parish (town) and unitary authority level: Sandbach Town Council and Cheshire East Council. The town council is based at Sandbach Town Hall on High Street.

=== Administrative history ===
Sandbach was an ancient parish. It was subdivided into 14 townships:

- Arclid
- Betchton
- Blackden
- Bradwall
- Church Hulme
- Cotton
- Cranage
- Goostrey-cum-Barnshaw
- Hassall
- Leese (part)
- Rudheath (part)
- Sandbach
- Twemlow
- Wheelock

Some of the townships had chapels of ease. Betchton and Hassall were in the Nantwich Hundred; the rest of the parish was in Northwich Hundred. From the 17th century onwards, parishes were gradually given various civil functions under the poor laws, in addition to their original ecclesiastical functions. In some cases, including Sandbach, the civil functions were exercised by each township separately rather than the parish as a whole. In 1866, the legal definition of 'parish' was changed to be the areas used for administering the poor laws, and so the townships also became civil parishes, which therefore diverged from the ecclesiastical parish.

The township of Sandbach was made a local government district in 1862, administered by an elected local board. The board funded the construction of Sandbach Town Hall, on a site donated by Hungerford Crewe, 3rd Baron Crewe. The building was completed in 1890, after which the old town hall which had stood in the middle of the market place was demolished.

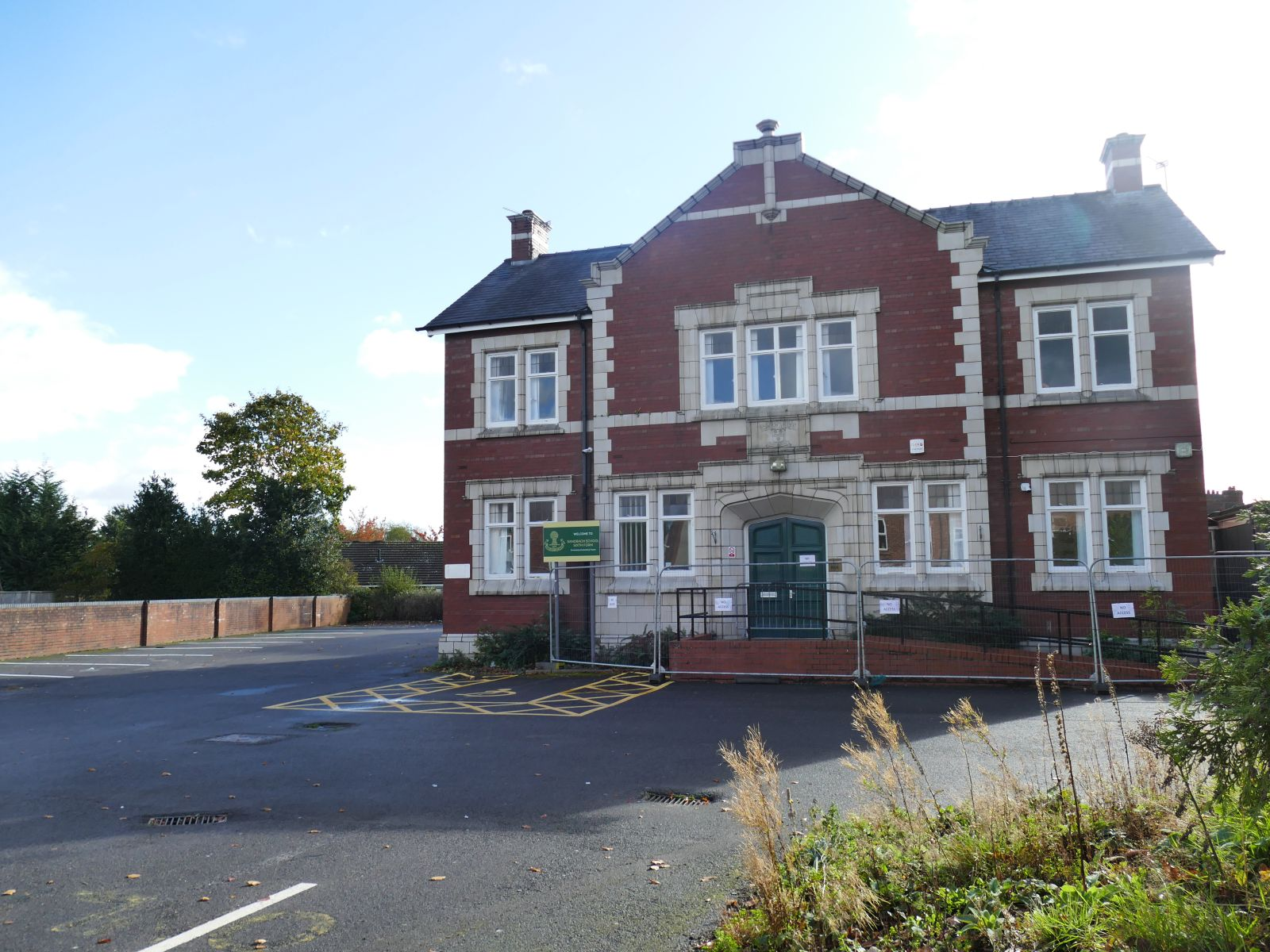
Sandbach House, Crewe Road: Built 1937 as urban district council's headquarters

Local government districts were reconstituted as urban districts under the Local Government Act 1894. The urban district was significantly enlarged in 1936 to take in the Elworth area west of the town (including Sandbach railway station) and Wheelock to the south to the town. Sandbach Urban District Council subsequently built itself new offices incorporating a council chamber on Crewe Road in 1937.

Sandbach Urban District was abolished in 1974 under the Local Government Act 1972. A successor parish called Sandbach was established covering the area of the abolished urban district, with its parish council taking the name Sandbach Town Council. District-level functions passed to Congleton Borough Council. In 2009, Cheshire East Council was created, taking over the functions of the borough council and Cheshire County Council, which were both abolished. Cheshire East Council had its headquarters at Westfields on Middlewich Road in Sandbach until 2024, when the building was closed after the council moved its main offices to Crewe.

=== Constituencies ===
The town is in the Congleton constituency whose MP is Sarah Russell of the Labour Party. Before the 2024 General Election the MP was Fiona Bruce of the Conservative Party.

== Geography ==
The land area of Sandbach has a total coverage of 10.7 square kilometres (4.1 sq mi). The distance from London to Sandbach is 171 miles (275 km). Crewe is 6 miles (10 km) to the south-west and Stoke-on-Trent in the neighbouring Staffordshire is 15 miles (24 km).

== Landmarks ==
The Sandbach Crosses are an important historical feature on the cobbled market square: the two Saxon crosses, reportedly built in the 7th, 8th or 9th century, constitute a Scheduled Ancient Monument. A plaque near the crosses reads:

Saxon crosses completed in the 9th century to commemorate the advent of Christianity in this Kingdom of Mercia about AD 653 in the reign of the Saxon king Penda. They were restored in 1816 by Sir John Egerton after destruction by iconoclasts.

Sandbach is also home to many listed buildings, including Sandbach School, St Mary's Church and the Old Hall Hotel. Many of the local public houses, which were formerly stage coach stops, are listed, for example the Lower Chequer. Many of the buildings of the town were designed by the renowned architect Sir George Gilbert Scott; he designed Sandbach Literary Institute, Sandbach School, St John's, Sandbach Heath and the Almshouses. He also restored St Mary's Church. The town has Methodist, Baptist, Anglican and Catholic churches.

Natural England has designated Sandbach Flashes, a group of 14 separate waterbodies, as a Site of Special Scientific Interest (SSSI), described as:

[A] site of physiographical and biological importance. It consists of a series of pools formed as a result of subsidence due to the solution of underlying salt deposits [...] that show considerable variation in their plant and animal communities.

At least 225 species of bird have been recorded on the Flashes.

== Economy ==
Sandbach has been a market town since 1579 when it was granted a Royal Charter by Elizabeth I. Today the Thursday market is still held outdoors on Scotch Common, and in and around Sandbach Town Hall.

Sandbach is probably best known as the original home of both Foden and ERF lorries, both companies founded by members of the Foden family. Neither company now exists in Sandbach, having been taken over and production moved elsewhere. As of 2007 there is no trace of Fodens within Sandbach, with the former mansion home of the Foden family at Westfields being demolished to make way for a new council building. However, Foden's Brass Band, originally created for employees, is still based in Sandbach.

There is also a farmers' market which takes place on the second Saturday of each calendar month.

Sandbach lies close to the conurbations of Greater Manchester, Merseyside and The Potteries.

== Transport ==
=== Rail ===
The town is served by Sandbach railway station, on the Crewe to Manchester Line, which is located to the west of the town in Elworth. Services are operated by Northern Trains between Crewe, Manchester Piccadilly and Liverpool Lime Street. Trains operate generally twice an hour in both directions; northbound services alternate between trains to Manchester (via Stockport) and to Liverpool (via Styal and Manchester).

There is a branch line north of the station leading to Northwich, which is mainly used by goods traffic and express passenger trains heading to Chester. Some organisations have been campaigning to restore a local passenger service between Northwich and Crewe.

=== Road ===
Pressure of road traffic going from Greater Manchester to Crewe has forced the building of a bypass for Sandbach, Wheelock, Wheelock Heath, Winterley and Haslington for the A534. This is largely due to the M6 motorway which has a junction (J17) at Sandbach, which is close to the RoadChef service station.

=== Buses ===
Local bus services are provided by D&G Bus.

== Public services ==
In Sandbach water services are provided by United Utilities. Healthcare is provided at Ashfields Primary Care Centre. The primary care centre is overseen by Central and Eastern Cheshire Primary Care Trust. The nearest local hospital is Leighton Hospital in Crewe. Sandbach is served by the North West Ambulance Service. Policing is provided by Cheshire Constabulary. Cheshire Fire & Rescue Service runs the fire station in the town.

== Education ==
=== Primary schools ===
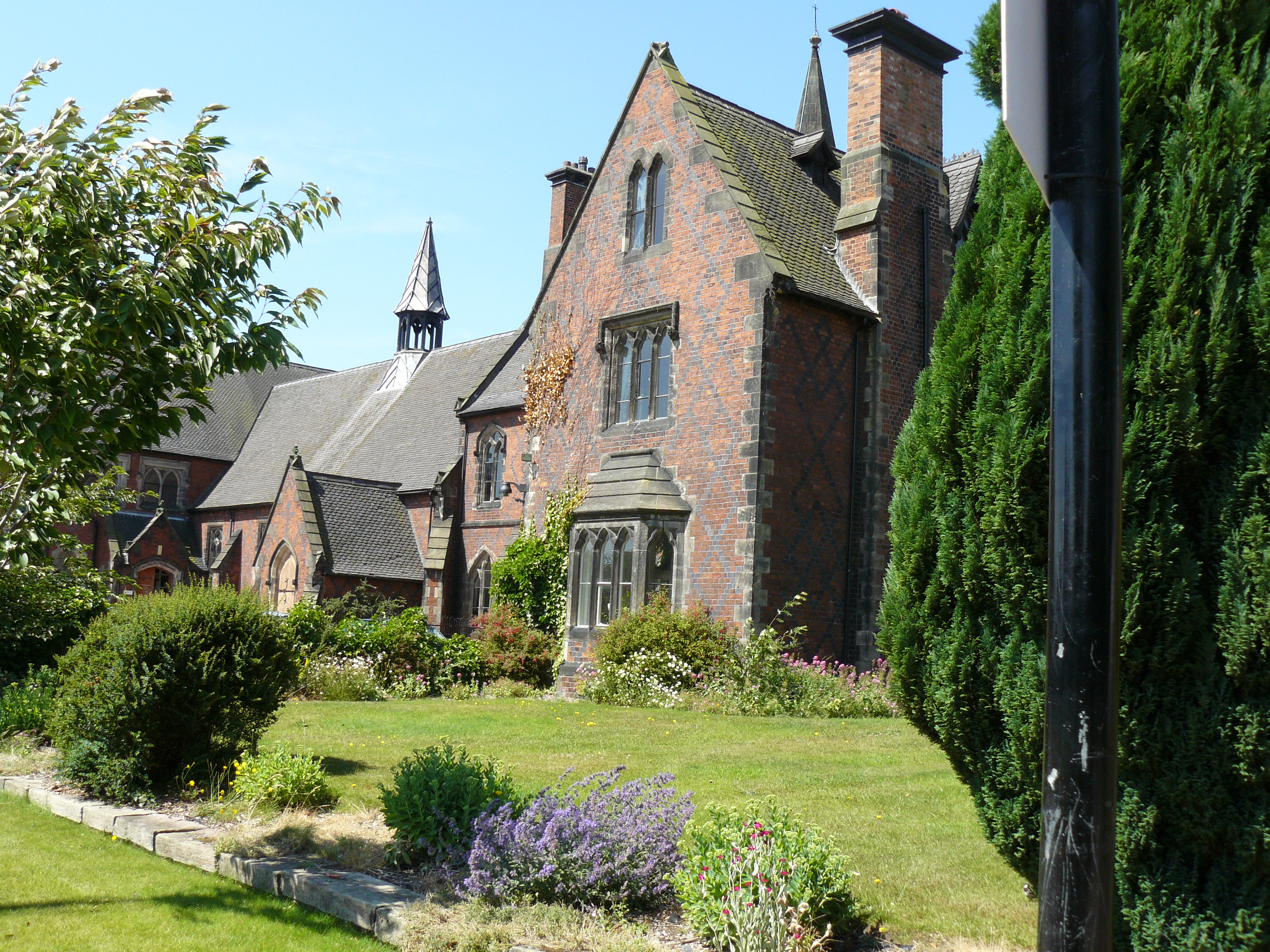
School House at Sandbach School

The following primary schools are in Sandbach Town and Civil Parish.

- Sandbach Community Primary School
- Offley Primary School
- Sandbach Heath St John's CE Primary School
- Wheelock Primary School
- Elworth Church of England Primary School
- Elworth Hall Primary School

=== Secondary schools ===
Sandbach School was founded as a parish charity school for boys in 1677. The school became a grammar school for boys after 1955. In 1979 the school became an independent comprehensive boys school, with charitable status, funded by Cheshire Local Education Authority but controlled by a board of governors. In September 2011, Sandbach School became a free school, one of the first free schools to be established in England. The school also contains a sixth form which is open to both boys and girls.

Within Sandbach there is also a girls comprehensive school, Sandbach High. It was originally the town's mixed secondary modern when Sandbach School served as the boys' grammar school, but has been a single-sex comprehensive since 1979. It now has a college attached to it, which accepts boys as well as girls and offers a more vocational side of education along with A levels.

=== Cadets ===
1873 (Sandbach) Squadron is the local squadron of the Air Training Corps. Founded in 1952, it is part of Greater Manchester Wing, having formerly been a part of both Cheshire and Staffordshire Wings. Cadets here parade twice a week; Wednesdays and Fridays from 19:15 to 21:30. The squadron usually parades about 30–40 cadets per parade night.

24 Sandbach Detachment, Cheshire Army Cadet Force is based in the Army Cadet Centre behind the police station.

Sandbach Fire Station Cadets consists of around 20 young people and meet every Tuesday evening.

The Combined Cadet Force (CCF) is based at Sandbach School.

== Culture ==
Sandbach has an annual transport festival which usually takes place during April. It originally started in 1992 as ‘Transport Through the Ages Parade', and was such a success that it became an annual event; since its inception it has been run alongside the National Town Criers' competition. The Festival is run by an organising committee made up of local councils and volunteers.

Foden's Brass Band is still based in the town, despite the truck manufacturer from which it derives its name no longer having a presence. In 2008 Foden's became British Open Brass Band Champions. The Lions Youth Brass Band and Roberts Bakery Band are also based in the town.

Sandbach Choral Society, formerly Sandbach Voices, is a local choir that was founded in 1947 and is a registered charity. The choir's mission is to bring choral music into the community, and it regularly stages concerts, often in Sandbach Town Hall or at St Mary's Church.

Sandbach Concert Series features classical, jazz and brass music.

At the end of November every year the Christmas lights are turned on by the chairman of the town council.

=== Media ===
Local newspapers distributed in Sandbach include The Chronicle (Sandbach & Middlewich edition), published on Wednesdays (and now incorporated into the Crewe Chronicle); the Chronicle Series paper Sandbach Chronicle, published on Thursdays; Crewe Guardian on Thursdays; the South Cheshire Advertiser; and the daily Sentinel (Cheshire edition). The Saxon is a free 8-page bimonthly delivered to 7,000 homes, and the Sandbach & District Talking Newspaper is a weekly local talking newspaper aimed at assisting the visually impaired, with over 1000 issues since the first in December 1986.

Local TV coverage is provided by BBC North West and ITV Granada. Television signals are received from the Winter Hill TV transmitter.

South Cheshire is served by BBC Radio Stoke. It is also in the broadcast area of Cheshire FM, Macclesfield based Cheshire's Silk Radio and Stoke-on-Trent-based Hits Radio Staffordshire & Cheshire and Greatest Hits Radio Staffordshire & Cheshire.

== Sport ==
The local football clubs are Sandbach United, an "FA Charter Standard Club" which has over 40 teams and 600 players aged from 5 through to veteran. The club was founded in 2004 when Sandbach Albion and Sandbach Ramblers merged. In 2009 it completed work with the borough council in developing its new sports facility. The first team turned semi-professional and were promoted to the North West Counties League within the English non-league football pyramid at step 6 in 2016, reaching the league cup final and a play-off position in their first season. Sandbach Town an "FA charter standard club" who play in The Cheshire league and Sandbach curshaws who play in the Crewe & District Football League.

The local rugby union club is Sandbach RUFC. The club is the largest sports club in the area. Sandbach 1st XV play in the RFU National 3 Midlands; many levels higher than other local rivals. Currently at Level 5, they are one of the few truly amateur clubs in the RFU National League structure. Many old boys have gone on to play Premiership and International Rugby. Sandbach Rugby Club offers playing opportunities for both sexes of all ages. Every Tuesday evening at 7.00pm the club offers Social Touch (a non-contact game) to all adults. Touch rugby is open to the public and is free of charge.

The local cricket club is Sandbach Cricket Club. In 2008 the First XI won the Cheshire Cricket Alliance League – Division 1 on the last day of the season to gain promotion to the Meller Braggins League – Division 3. Another local side is Elworth Cricket Club which plays in the North Staffs & South Cheshire Cricket League – Championship Division 1. The Club operates 5 senior teams, a midweek team and 9 junior teams at U9, U11, U13, U15 and U17 levels. Sandbach Squash Club enters two teams in the North West Counties League.

There are two golf clubs in Sandbach. Sandbach Golf Club is located on Middlewich Road, approximately ½ a mile west of the town centre. It was founded in 1895 and is a challenging 9-hole parkland course (with 16 tees) welcoming both members and visitors during the week and at weekends. Malkins Bank Golf Course is an 18-hole course formerly operated by Cheshire East Council. Sandbach also has a thriving darts league – with both men's and ladies' leagues playing in most of the many pubs in the area.

Sandbach Leisure Centre is on Middlewich Road and is run by Cheshire East Council. Sandbach School offers community sports facilities.

== Notable people ==
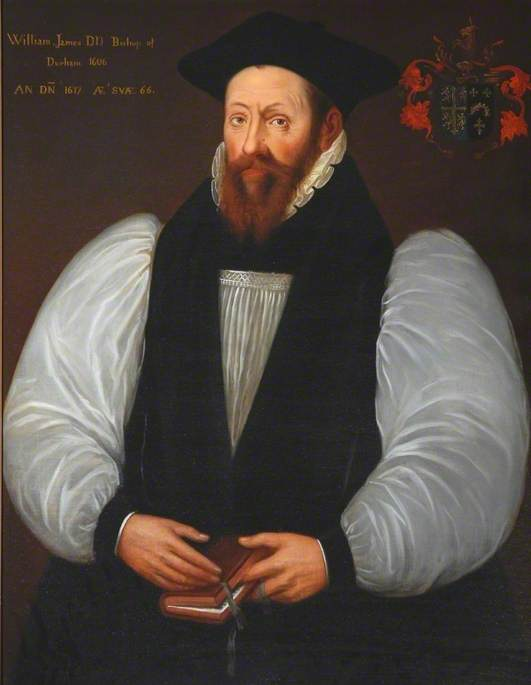
William James, ca.1617

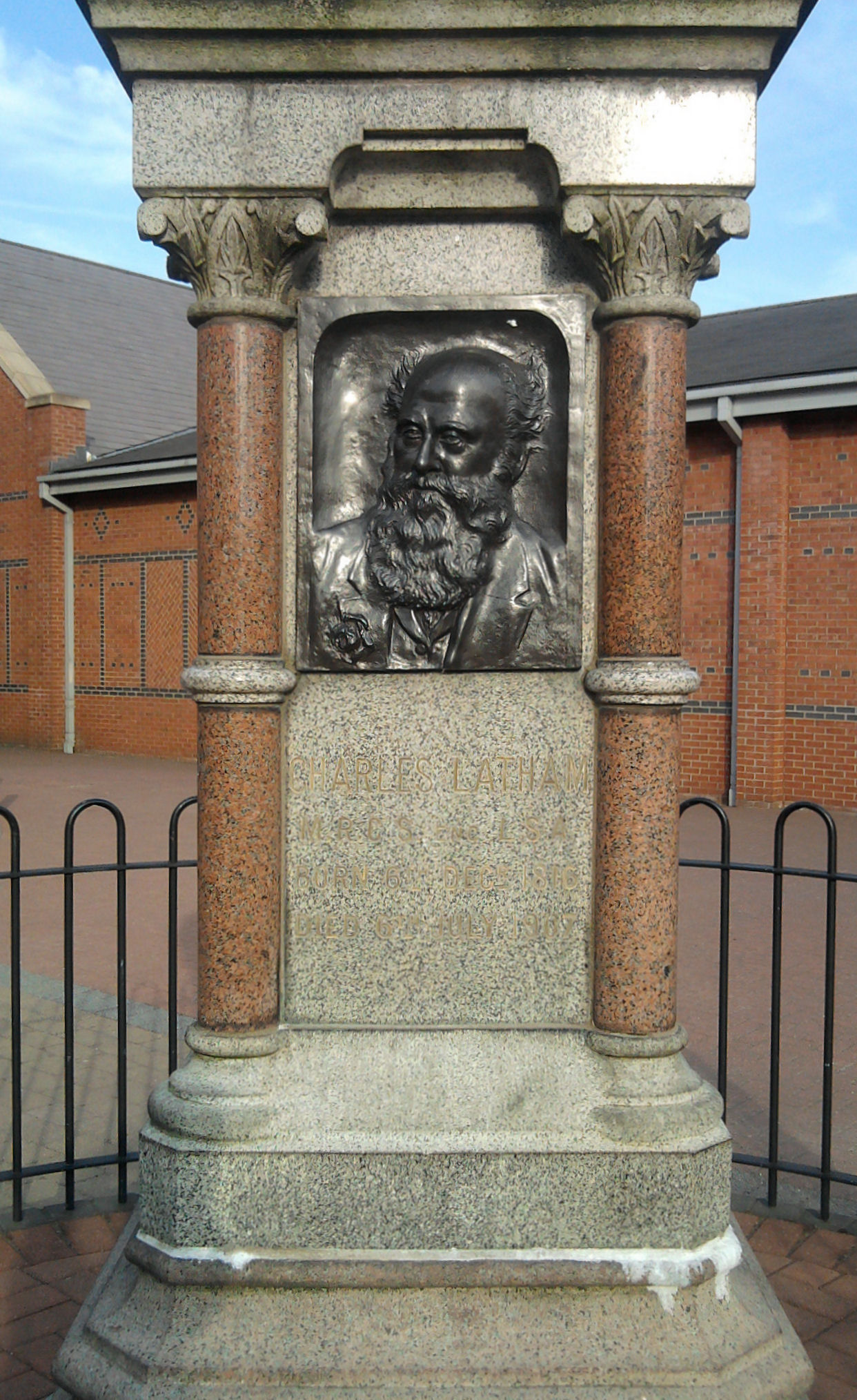
Local public memorial statue to Charles Latham (1816–1907) physician

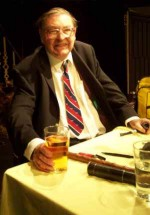
Blaster Bates, 2006

- Rev. William James (1542 – 1617), academic born locally and Bishop of Durham.
- William Steele (1610–1680), Lord Chancellor of Ireland, born in Sandbach
- Henry Newcome (1627–1695), clergyman, ordained as Presbyterian minister in Sandbach
- John Brereton, 4th Baron Brereton (1659–1718), baron in the Peerage of Ireland, lived at Brereton Hall
- John Latham (1761–1843), physician, bought an estate in Sandbach
- Samuel Henshall (1764/65–1807), philologist, invented a type of corkscrew. baptised in Sandbach.
- John Latham (1787–1853), magistrate and poet, buried at Sandbach
- Peter Mere Latham (1789–1875), physician, son of John Latham, educated at Sandbach School
- Charles Latham (1816–1907), physician, recognised by public memorial statue
- Anthony Palmer (1819 Brereton Green – 1892), English recipient of the Victoria Cross
- George William Latham (1827–1886), English landowner and barrister.
- Edwin Foden (1841–1911), founder of a British truck and bus manufacturing company Foden Trucks
- Alfred Barratt (1844–1881), philosophical writer and barrister, went to school in Sandbach.
- Sir John Barlow, 1st Baronet (1857–1932), businessman and Liberal Party politician.
- Sir Charles Lidbury (1880–1978), president Institute of Bankers (1939–46), worked in Sandbach
- Fred Mortimer (1880–1953), brass band conductor, Foden's Brass Band
- Ivor Armstrong Richards (1893–1979), educator, literary critic, poet, and rhetorician
- Harry Mortimer (1902–1992), brass band conductor, Foden Brass Band musician, RNCM professor of trumpet
- John M. Allegro (1923–1988), archaeologist and Dead Sea Scrolls scholar, lived and died in Sandbach
- Blaster Bates (1923–2006), demolition expert, real name Derek Macintosh Bates
- Wally Oakes (1932–1965), train driver, died from burns to stop his damaged train, lived at Wheelock Heath
- George Roper (1934–2003), comedian, lived in the town at the time of his death
- David Eastwood (born 1959), Vice-Chancellor of University of Birmingham, educated at Sandbach School
- Karl Beattie (born 1963), English television director, producer and cameraman, lives near Sandbach
- Denise Coates (born 1967), billionaire businesswoman, founder and joint CEO of Bet365, lives in Betchton
- Yvette Fielding (born 1968), TV presenter, actress, writer and paranormal investigator, lives near Sandbach
- Neil and Rob Gibbons (born 1976 or 77), screenwriters

=== Sport ===
- Thomas Hilditch (1885 in Sandbach – 1957), English first-class cricketer.
- Frank Roberts (1893–1961), footballer, played 373 games including 216 for Manchester City
- Bert Sproston (1914–2000), footballer, played 125 games for Manchester City and 11 times for England
- Barrie Wheatley (born 1938), footballer, played for Sandbach Ramblers, Crewe Alexandra, and Rochdale
- Matt Beesley (born 1992 in Sandbach), rugby union player, played 65 games for Wharfedale R.U.F.C.
- Mia Brookes (born 2007), British snowboarder

== See also ==
- Listed buildings in Sandbach
