= Blaster Bates =

English explosives and demolition expert (1923–2006)

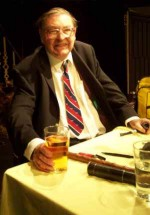
- Blaster Bates pictured in 2003
- Born: Derek Macintosh Bates; 5 February 1923; Crewe, Cheshire, England
- Died: 1 September 2006 (aged 83)
- Known for: Speaker and demolition expert

Blaster Bates was the name used by Derek Macintosh Bates (5 February 1923 – 1 September 2006), an English explosives and demolition expert and raconteur, who was born in Crewe. He made a series of sound recordings from the 1960s to 1980s, recounting bizarre and funny experiences from his long career, and tales of his hobbies of motorcycling, hunting and shooting. He was much in demand as an after-dinner speaker. His tales often featured coarse language. Once, for instance, he was hired to clear out a farm's septic tank using explosives, an episode Bates described as "The Shower of Shit Over Cheshire". On another occasion he surprised a young couple in what he described as 'a compromising position' whilst clearing trees for the Oulton Park racing circuit, an incident which gave the Knickerbrook corner its name.

Bates served with the Royal Air Force during the Second World War as a Handley Page Halifax bomber pilot, and then learned his explosives skills as a bomb disposal specialist. After the war he returned to his previous employer Rolls-Royce, hoping to resume his old job, but was told "We're cutting down, you know". Bates then started his own demolition business, drawing on his wartime expertise. He later noted that it was a good decision, as "over the years I've managed to do all right while Rolls-Royce have gone steadily bust".

He was known for carrying sticks of explosive in his pockets, even producing them while giving testimony in trials, to the horror of the court. Most high explosives are harmless unless used with a detonator, but this is not generally understood.

Bates had diabetes. In August 2006 he was admitted to hospital with congestive heart failure, and on 1 September 2006 he died, aged 83. He was buried at St Mary's church in Sandbach town centre.

== Recordings ==
Currently available CD re-releases in the UK

- Laughter with a Bang +bonus tracks from 1001 Gelignites (CD BBCD01) (2003) Label: Topic Records
- TNT for Two +bonus tracks from Hunting and Shooting stories (CD BBSV17) (2003) Label : Big Ben / Tangent
- Watch out for the bits +bonus tracks from Gelly Babe (CD BVBSV16) (2002) Label : Big Ben
- Blastermind +bonus tracks from Lift off (CD BBSV18) (2007) Label: Big Ben / Tangent

Original LP & cassette releases Label – Big Ben

- Vol. 1 Laughter with a bang BB00.01/BBMC1 Mono 1967
- Vol. 2 1001 Gelignites BB00.03/BBMC3 Mono 1968
- Vol. 3 TNT for Two BB00.05/BBMC5 Mono 1969
- Vol. 4 Watch out for the bits BB00.07/BBMC7 Mono 1971
- Vol. 5 Lift-off BB00.09/BBMC9 Stereo 1973
- Vol. 6 Gelly Babe BB00.11/BBMC11 Stereo 1975
- Vol. 7 Blastermind BB00.13/BBMC13 Stereo 1980
- Vol. 8 Hunting and Shooting stories BB00.15/BBMC15 Stereo 1984

Video

- Stand Well Back (VHS Video, PAL format, UK only) – live on stage

Other known recordings

- Dunlop footwear Promo, extracts from Lift-off on Flexi-disk, given away at stand 36, Harrogate 1978.
- Blast it, (Cassette only) compilation.
- Blaster Bates with Redditch Controls, Marston Paxman and Norgren at the Stratford Hilton.
  Recorded March 1977 and given away as Christmas gift to Imperial Metal Industries staff and customers (Label – Tangent).

Bootlegs

- Blaster Bates at Huntingdon Hall 4 October 2003

Book

- The Master Blaster. Simon & Schuster. 1994. ISBN 0-671-71386-8.
