= Mossley CE Primary School =

School in Congleton, England

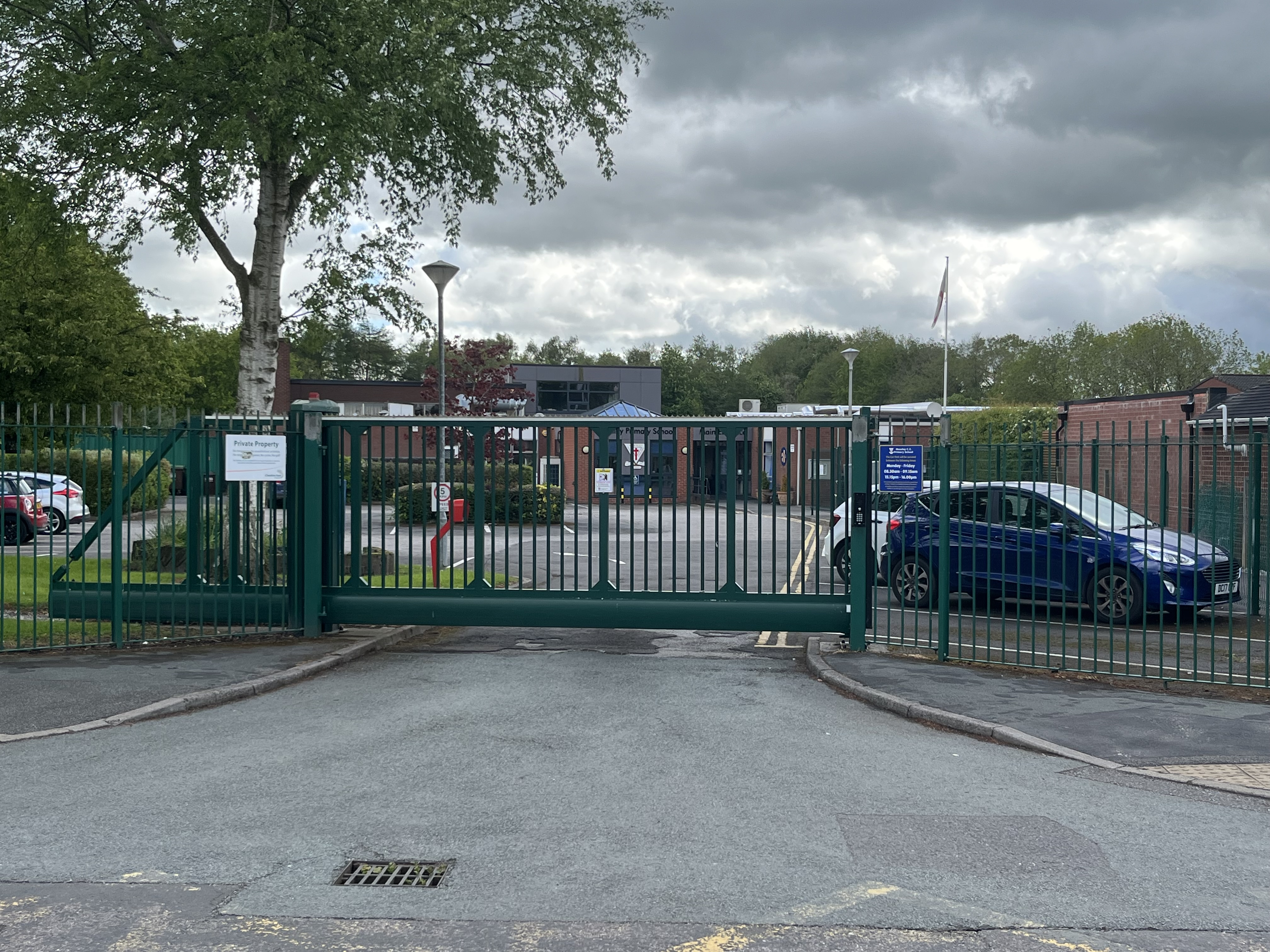
- Mossley CE Primary School in May 2026.

Location
- Boundary Lane; Congleton, Cheshire, CW12 3JA; England

Information
- Former name: Mossley National School
- Type: Academy
- Motto: live out your best life
- Religious affiliation: Church of England
- Local authority: Cheshire East Council
- Trust: Mossley Academy Trust
- Department for Education URN: 141152 Tables
- Ofsted: Reports
- Headteacher: Helen Harrison
- Gender: Coeducational
- Age: 4 to 11
- Enrolment: 421
- Website: www.mossleyce.cheshire.sch.uk

Mossley CE Primary School is a co-educational Church of England Primary School with academy status located in the town of Congleton in Cheshire, England.

== History ==
=== Original School ===
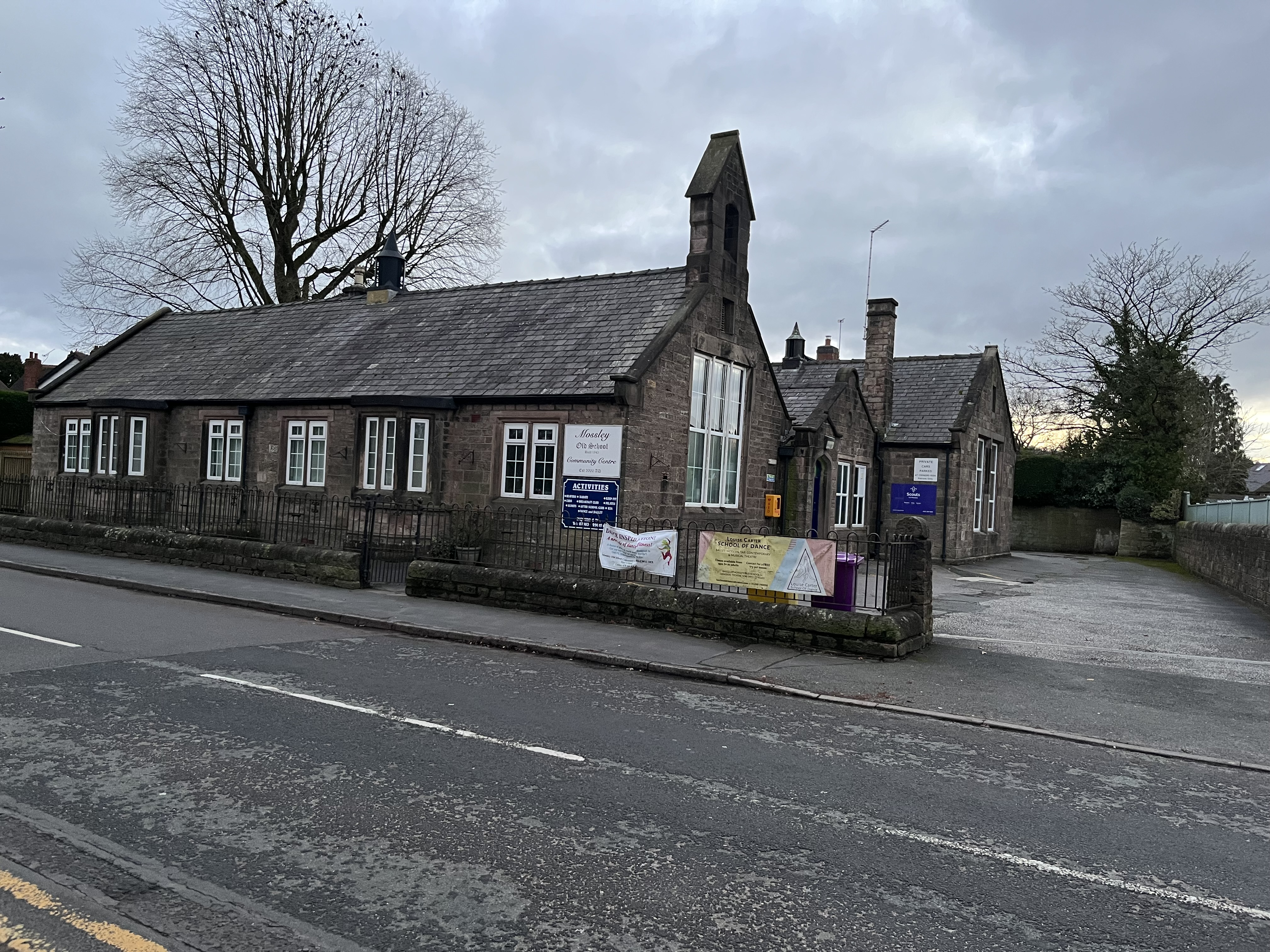
Mossley Old School is the former site and former buildings of Mossley CE Primary School.

The first site of Mossley CE Primary School was built in 1845, and cost £910 to construct.

The school opened it was called Mossley National School.

Parents began to raise concerns about the conditions of the school by 1970, with almost 200 parents complaining of overcrowded classrooms and subpar washroom facilities. Overcrowding at the school was to the extent that one class lacked a classroom, and it was suggested that they should be taught in a temporary hut located in a nearby carpark. In 1972 approval was given for the construction of a new school to replace the school at time, the new school was planned to be named "Congleton Moseley County Primary School".

=== Current School ===
The current Boundary Lane site of the school was purchased in 1963, this was done due to the former school buildings needing to be replaced due to long standing overcrowding issues.

Mossley CE Primary School moved to its current site in 1975.

Upon moving to the current site, the old school buildings from 1845 were used by a local scout group. The old school buildings are now known as the Mossley Community Centre.

In 1984, pupil Andrew Shallcross was one of nine people killed in an accident at Dartford Crossing.

In 1988 Mossley CE Primary School had restored to using temporary classrooms due to overcrowding.

By late 1993 due to the level of overcrowding Mossley CE Primary School was considering halting the 1994 intake of new pupils, and was planning to restrict the teaching of the full National Curriculum from early 1994.

In 1998, Mossley CE Primary School was rated as one of the best schools in the England during the academic year 1996-1997 by Ofsted.

On 28 July 2012, a planning application was submitted by Mossley CE Primary School to build a new building on at school, the new building was planned to be used by the local pre-school. The planning application was withdrawn later that year.

Mossley CE Primary School converted to an academy in 2014 and joined the Mossley Academy Trust.

On 14 January 2015, Mossley CE Primary School re-submitted the 2012 planning application, the planning application was approved in March 2015.

On 8 September 2026 Mossley CE Primary School submitted a planning application for an extension in order to add more classrooms to the school.

== Ofsted ==
The 2017 Ofsted report for Mossley CE Primary School rated the school as "Requires Improvement".

By the time of the 2025 Ofsted inspection "Mossley CofE Primary School has taken effective action to maintain the standards identified at the previous inspection."

== Head Teachers ==
- Mrs Doris McGowan (1983-1998)
- Mrs Sheila Gee (1999-2006)
- Mrs Sue Aston (2010-2017)
- Mrs Helen Harrison (2025)
