= Sir William Stanier School =

Location
- Coronation Street; Crewe; Cheshire, CW1 4EB; England; 53°06′19″N 2°26′01″W

Information
- Type: Academy
- Established: 1977
- Local authority: Cheshire East Council
- Trust: The Learning Partnership
- Department for Education URN: 139953 Tables
- Ofsted: Reports
- Headteacher: Elizabeth Robinson
- Gender: Co-educational
- Age: 11 to 16
- Enrollment: 693 (November 2024)
- Capacity: 1050
- Website: www.sirwilliamstanier.co.uk

Sir William Stanier School is a co-educational secondary school located in Crewe in the English county of Cheshire. The school is named after William Stanier, a former railway engineer, and Chief Mechanical Engineer of the London, Midland and Scottish Railway.

== History ==
The school was first established in 1977 as Coppenhall High School, after the amalgamation of two local schools; Brierley Street Boys School and Brierley Street Girls School.

In 2005 it was announced that Coppenhall High School would amalgamate with another local school, Victoria Community Technology School due to low enrollment rates in the Crewe and Nantwich areas. The schools formally amalgamated on the Coppenhall High site in September 2007 and was renamed Sir William Stanier School. New school buildings were then designed by Aedas and constructed by Willmott Dixon from 2010.

Previously a community school administered by Cheshire East Council, in September 2013 Sir William Stanier School converted to academy status. The school was then sponsored by the Congleton Multi-Academy Trust, however the trust merged with the Knutsford Multi-Academy Trust in September 2020 to form The Learning Alliance. The Learning Alliance merged with The Learning for Life Partnership trust in September 2023 to form The Learning Partnership, which currently sponsors the school.

In June 2023, proposals were put forward to change the name of the school. However, after feedback, the proposed changes did not go ahead.

== Academics ==
Sir William Stanier School offers GCSEs and BTECs as programmes of study for pupils. The school also has a specialism in Science.
