= Lee Imiolek =

English rugby union footballer

- Born: Lee Andrzej Imiolek; 21 September 1990 (age 36) Manchester, England
- Height: 1.75 m (5 ft 9 in)
- Weight: 150 kg (23 st 9 lb)
- School: Sandbach School

Rugby union career
- Position: Prop
Senior career
Years	Team	Apps	(Points)
2009–13	Sale Sharks	39	(5)
2013–	Yorkshire Carnegie	94	(9)
- Correct as of 12 May 2012
International career
Years	Team	Apps	(Points)
2009–10	England U20	9	(0)

Lee Imiolek (born 21 September 1990, in Manchester) is an English rugby union footballer. He plays as a prop. He plays his club rugby for the RFU Championship side Leeds Carnegie. He made his first appearance for Sale Sharks against London Irish on 28 March 2010.
