= Sandbach School =

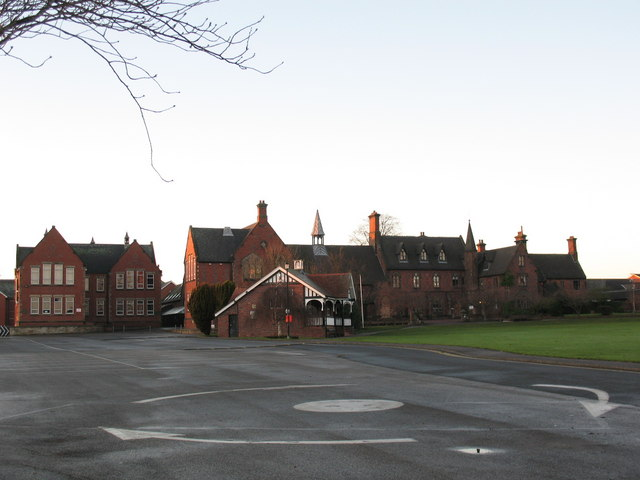
- School badge Sandbach School building

Location
- Crewe Road; Sandbach, Cheshire, CW11 3NS; England
- 53°08′34″N 2°22′15″W

Information
- Type: 11–18 Boy's Free School with co–education sixth form
- Motto: Latin: Ut Severis Seges; As you sow, so shall you reap
- Established: 1677; 349 years ago
- Founders: Richard Lea and Francis Welles
- Department for Education URN: 137491 Tables
- Ofsted: Reports
- Headteacher: Sarah Burns
- Staff: 170
- Gender: Boys (Mixed in the Sixth Form)
- Age: 11 to 18
- Enrolment: 1,509 boys
- Houses: Craig, Lea, Ward and Welles
- Colour
- Publication: The Sandbachian
- Website: http://www.sandbachschool.org/

Sandbach School is an 11–18 boys free school in Sandbach, Cheshire, north-west England. It was established in 1677 by local philanthropists, including Richard Lea, who donated the land for the school, and Francis Welles, who helped to fund the schoolhouse. It was located at Egerton Lodge, Middlewich Road, before moving into a new set of buildings designed by George Gilbert Scott in 1851.

Boys are organised into four school houses – Craig, Lea, Ward and Welles, across Years 7–11. In June 2023, 1,509 boys attended the school, with the lower school an entirely boys provision, whilst the sixth form is co–educational. Two-thirds of boys attending the school are from the Sandbach and Haslington area, with the remaining third coming from the Crewe area. The school is the largest provider of adult education in the area.

It became a private school in 1945, and a state-funded independent grammar school in 1955. It became a state-funded independent school accepting boys of all abilities in 1979, and became one of the country's first free schools in 2011. The current headteacher is Sarah Burns, who assumed the role in 2008.

== History ==
=== Establishment ===
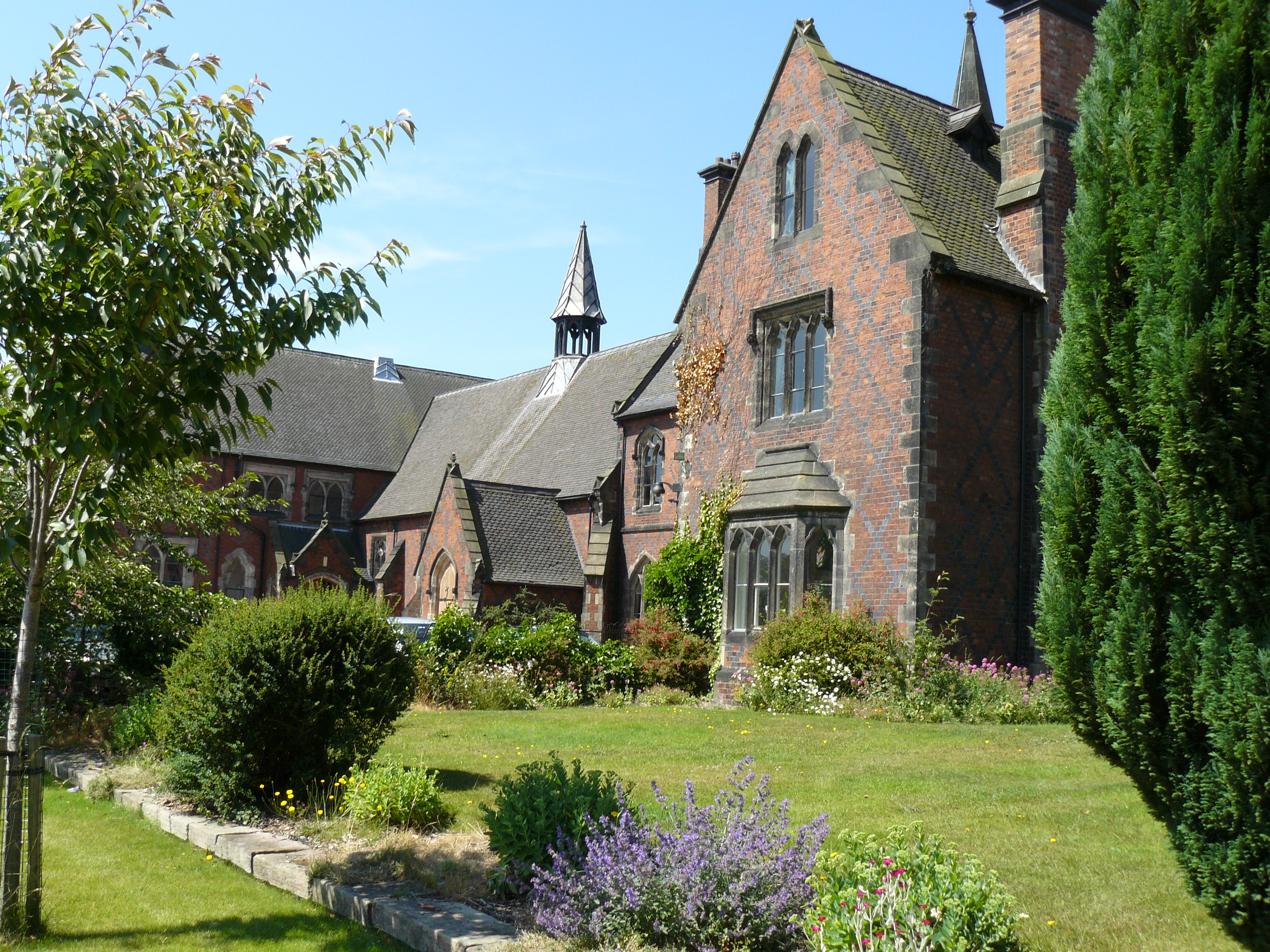
School House the original part of the school

A school existed in Sandbach as early as 1578, when the York visitation returns referred to a schoolmaster in the town. In 1606, the parish register also mentioned a schoolmaster in the town.

It was not until 1677, however, when the grammar school was properly founded by Richard Lea, after he gave a piece of land for the schoolhouse. Francis Welles and others paid for the construction of the schoolhouse. In 1718, a deed was drawn up that demonstrated how the school should be managed and gave instructions for the appointment of governors and a master. 20 poor boys of Sandbach were to be educated at the new school, and the second master was likely to have also been the parish curate.

Sandbach (Cheshire) Charities Act 1848
- Act of Parliament
- Parliament of Great Britain
- Long title: An Act to provide for the better Administration of certain Charities in the Parish of Sandbach in the County of Chester, and the Distribution of the Income thereof, and for vesting the Estates and Property belonging to the Charities in new Trustees, and to enable the Trustees to grant Leases of the Charity Estates; and for other Purposes.
- Citation: 11 & 12 Vict. c. 11 Pr.

Dates
- Royal assent: 31 August 1848

Text of statute as originally enacted

By 1816, the school had 60 pupils and was located at Egerton Lodge, Middlewich Road. In 1848, a private act of Parliament, the Sandbach (Cheshire) Charities Act 1848 (11 & 12 Vict. c. 11 Pr.), was passed that set out how the school should be better managed. An annual salary of £140 was set for the schoolmaster, and of £60 to the second master. From 1849, the school's buildings were replaced by buildings designed in the early English style by George Gilbert Scott. It entered these new buildings in 1851. By 1890, the school had a laboratory, gymnasium and swimming bath. In 1909, the school acquired eligibility for the Board of Education grants, but in 1945 the government decided that the school should no longer have direct access to these grants. The governors chose independence rather than becoming a local education authority (LEA) school.

=== Boys day grammar school ===
The school operated as an independent school until 1955, when it entered into a unique agreement with Cheshire County Council that it would maintain its independence and charitable status but operate as the boys' day grammar school in south-east Cheshire. In 1957, to help to alleviate the shortage of grammar school places in south-east Cheshire, the governors agreed with the local education authority to provide 60 places for boys based on residence, not ability. In 1976, these were increased in 180. In the same year, Sandbach School was first listed as a Grade II Listed building. 1979 saw the school enter into a new agreement with the LEA that it would have an all-ability intake of boys from a defined area of south-east Cheshire. In September 2011, Sandbach School became one of the first 24 free schools to open in the country.

== School structure ==
=== Enrolment ===
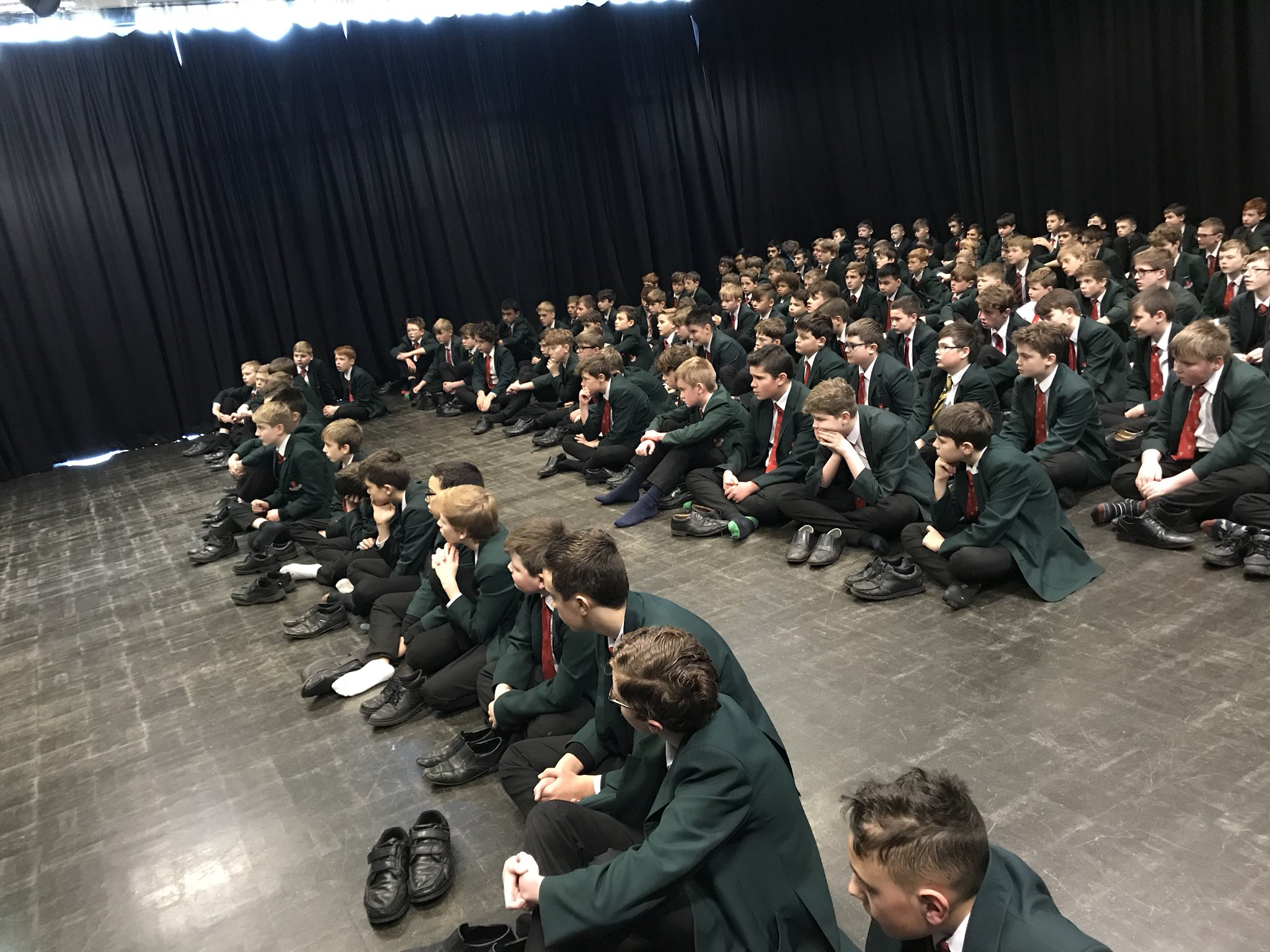
Year 8 boys attending a school assembly

At the last Ofsted inspection, in 2008, the school had 1167 students. In 2011, it was reported the school had 1220 students and was likely to rise to its capacity of 1265 by 2012/13 as a result of "organic growth due to rising demographics". The main primary school feeders to Sandbach School are Sandbach Primary, Wheelock Primary, Haslington Primary, The Dingle Primary, St John's Primary, Elworth Hall Primary, Elworth C of E Primary and Offley Road Primary. There are six other secondary schools and sixth forms in a five-mile radius: Sandbach High School and Sixth Form College, Holmes Chapel Comprehensive School, Alsager School, Sir William Stanier School, Middlewich High School and Congleton High School. In Year 10 and Year 11, a range of GCSEs and vocational subjects are offered, and in Sixth Form, the school offers AS-Levels, A-Levels and BTECs.

Sandbach School's published admission number (PAN) is 240 pupils per year, a figure which is given to all schools in England in order to determine whether any age group within a school is full or not. Sandbach School commits to admitting up to 24 boys into Year 7 at the school who display aptitude in either Music or Sport. Evidence of this aptitude will be required to be provided via an assessment event, to which all boys who have applied for a place under Priority 2 (Aptitude) will be invited. Boys with brothers, step-brothers or half-brothers living together as part of one household who are already attending Sandbach School and are expected to continue at the school the following school year, or boys with sisters, stepsisters or half-sisters already attending Sandbach High School & Sixth Form College and who expected to continue at Sandbach High School & Sixth Form College the following school year are given the fourth priority for allocation of places at Sandbach School in line with the schools admission policy.

Boys whose applications are unsuccessful for a place at Sandbach School will have their name placed on a waiting list for no more than one term after the start of the academic year, regardless of whether their parents decide to appeal the decision of not offering a place at the school to their school. After the one term waiting list agreement, boys named are removed from the waiting list, and parents who wish to remain on the waiting list must reconfirm their interest in writing to the Headteacher.

=== House System ===
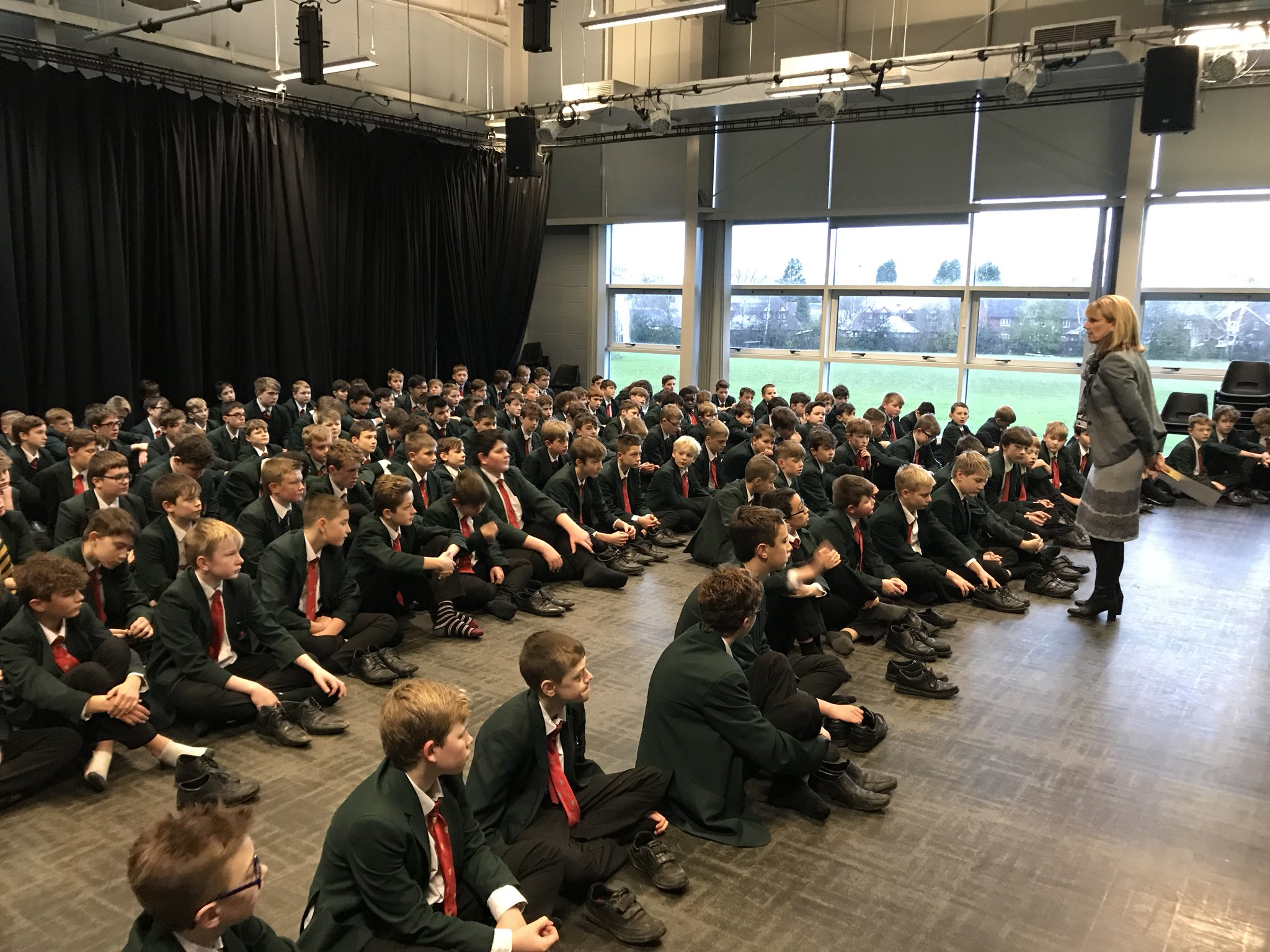
Boys from Lea House attending a house assembly

There are currently four Houses at Sandbach School, which students are grouped into. A student's House can be determined by the colour of the crest on their tie. All houses at Sandbach School compete to win points each year, which determines who will win the House Cup. For a short period of time in the early 1980s, the school had six Houses. These were: Hall (Ward was renamed Hall during this period), Welles, Lea, Craig, Scott and Kent.

The House system at Sandbach School suffered somewhat of a crisis during the 1930s, when the school decided to stop admitting boarders to the school, meaning the already diminishing school house became defunct. To compensate for the loss of the school house, the school was divided into four houses of "equal strength". Craig House is named after Ernest Craig began who had a long association with Sandbach School, first as a pupil and latterly as a very involved Old Boy who would become the president of the Old Sandbachians’ Association. Whilst serving as the Member of Parliament (MP) for Crewe, Craig maintained a strong connection with the school, acting as a Governor and had become involved in the administration of house events and associated awards. Lea house is named after Richard Lea, a local business man who donated a plot of land to educators on Middlewich Road to develop his vision for young boys from poorer backgrounds to have access to education.

In 1718, Dr. Charles Ward of Bradwall left a sum of £200 in his Will upon his death, which was stipulated to be used to pay for the board and education of three boys in particular “until they were fit for one of the universities.” These boys became known locally as ‘Ward’s Scholars’ and all went on to study at universities once they had left Sandbach School. To commemorate Ward's gesture and donation to the school, Ward House is named in his honour. Francis Welles, one of the men appointed by Richard Lea to set up the school invested money into the establishment of some of the school’s limited facilities at the time. At this time, children’s education often had to be paid for by donations of local people, Welles left a sum of money in his Will to be split between the school itself, as well as to be given to the local poor. In recognition of his contributions to Sandbach School, a scholarship was established in his name for students who engaged in sports, as well as being honoured by having the school's Welles House named after him.

==== House colours ====
Sandbach School House System
House Colour	House Name	In honour of
	Lea	Richard Lea for "goodwill and selflessness during the foundation of the school"
	Welles	Francis Welles for "establishment of the school’s limited facilities"
	Ward	Dr. Charles Ward of Bradwall for "cash donation which assisted the school to develop in the 18th Century"
	Craig	Ernest Craig for "long–standing association with Sandbach School"

=== Other aspects of provision ===
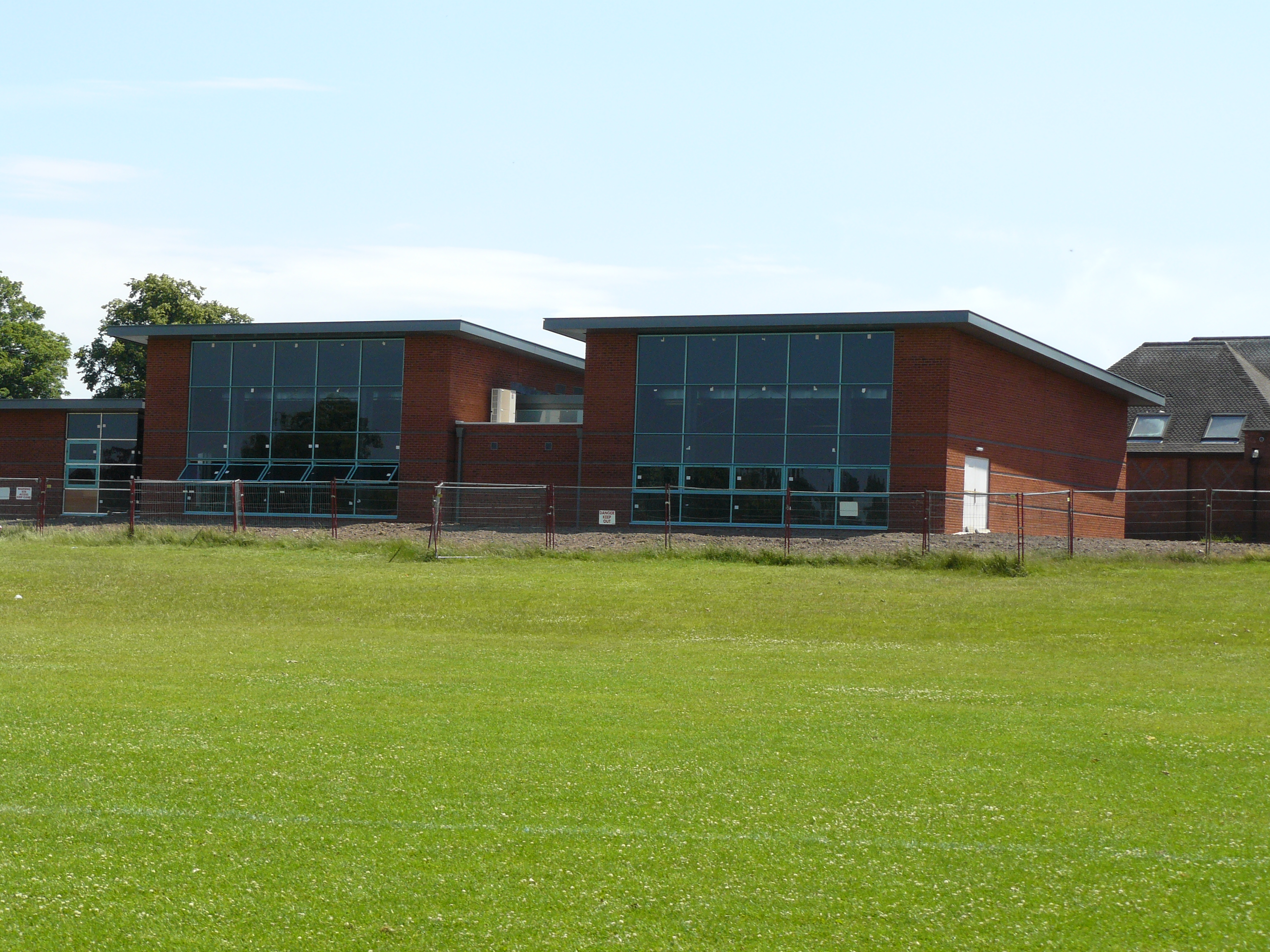
New build at Sandbach School

Sandbach School Adult Education Department is the largest provider of adult education courses in South Cheshire, offering up to 100 courses on Tuesday, Wednesday and Thursday evenings. The school has a wide range of extra-curricular activities including international mentors, reading club, war games club, languages club, many musical ensembles, drama/theatre, Duke of Edinburgh, rock climbing and many sports clubs.

There is also a Combined Cadet Force (CCF) contingent based at the school, which offers the vocational qualification of BTEC First Diploma in Public Service, which is worth four GCSEs in conjunction with the school. The contingent is run by Lt Col R.J. Ayres, a former teacher at the school.

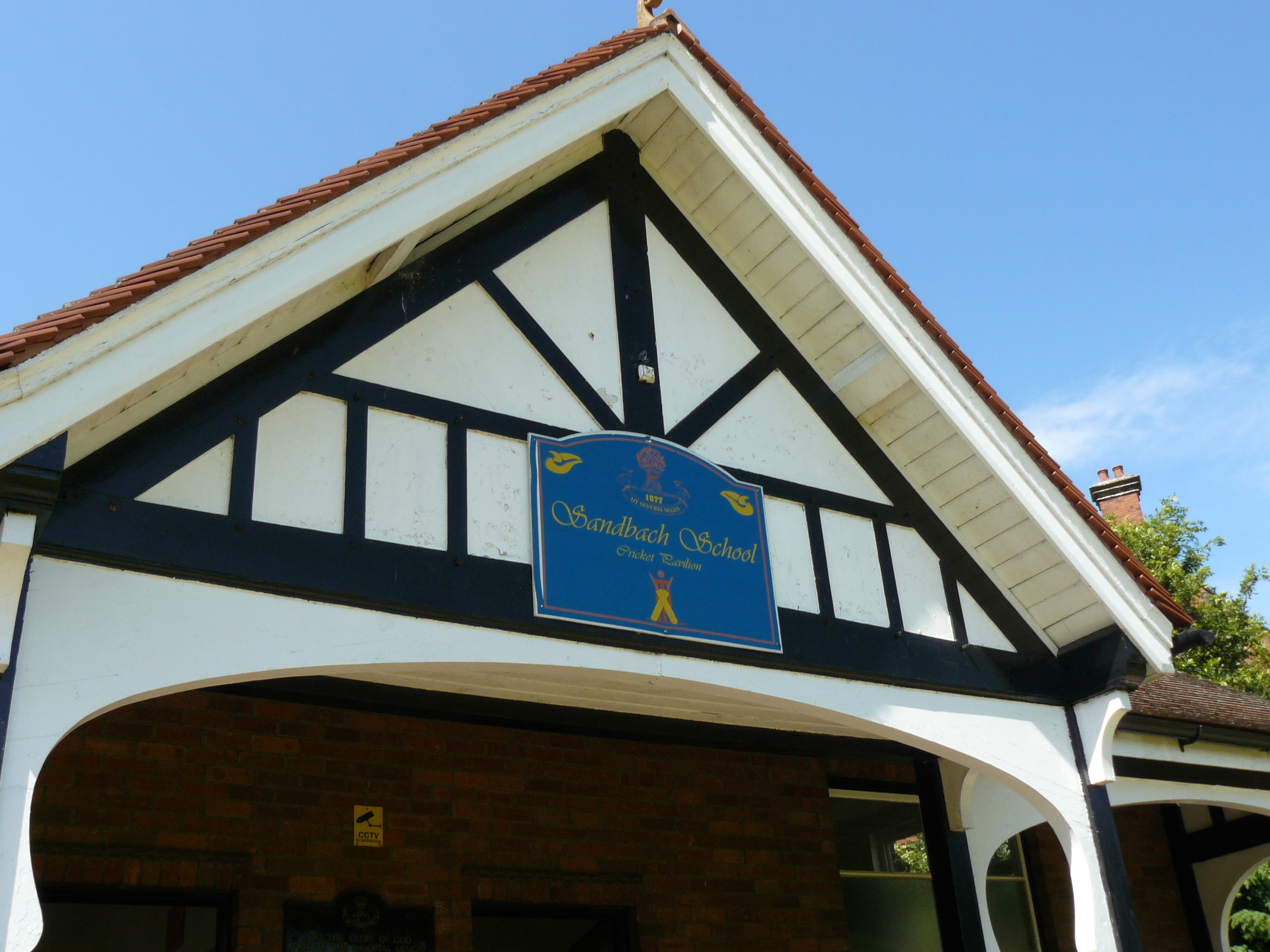
Sandbach School Cricket Pavilion

The school has a number of sports teams, including in rugby union, association football, field hockey, badminton, athletics, cricket, swimming, cross country, and golf.

The school has had success playing football in the Cheshire Schools FA competitions. In 2017–2018, the school won the U14 Hefin Roberts Cup and the U18 Don Ormes Cup for Schools. Historical results include winning the U18 Don Ormes Cup in 2011–2012, the U13 Redrow Cheshire Cup in 2015–2016, and the U15 Emberton Cup in 2011–2012. In 2017, Sandbach School's U13 cricket team won the U13 Hill Hopkins Trophy of the Cheshire Schools Cricket Association, beating Birkenhead School. In 2015, the school won the U12 Campey Cup, beating King's School, Macclesfield. In 2011, the school won the U14 Lord's Taverners' Cricketer Cup, beating King's School, Chester.

Sandbach School has an international reputation for drama and music, touring to Hong Kong, New Zealand and Brazil, and performing shows in the Edinburgh Fringe Festival. The school was awarded specialist arts college status in 2006. The school's theatrical director is John Lonsdale (awarded an MBE in the 2014 Queen's New Years Honours list); music is led by John Barber (principal trombonist with Foden's Band). The school's theatrical success led to the founding of a separate theatre group, the Ut Severis Seges Theatre Company (named after the school motto).

In Edinburgh, the school's 2004 performances of Macbeth and The Madness of King George III both garnered 4-star reviews within the fringe press. Following this, in 2006 the performance of the original play Oedipus, written by former pupil and future teacher Andrew Cargill, was also given a 4-star rating in the magazine Three Weeks. The school also performed Shakespeare's A Midsummer Night's Dream. Ut Severis Seges also toured to the Edinburgh Fringe alongside the school theatre group in 2006, with a production of Amadeus. A third tour of the Edinburgh Fringe took place in 2008, costing £20,000, with a new production of Oh! What A Lovely War, which gained a 5-star review, and 4-star performances by the school's Big Band.

The Sandbach School Big Band was formed in 2003. It has toured to Boston, USA and Berlin, and also performed at the finals of the National Jazz Festival 'Music for Youth', at Birmingham Conservatoire, and was a finalist at the 2007 National Festival of Music for Youth. In recent years the group has worked with many of the country's leading musicians including Georgie Fame. The Big Band have been winners of the Cheshire East Schools' Music Competition for the past 3 years (2010 to 2012).

In 2007 the school hosted the British Youth Film Academy's production of the film The School That Roared, allowing school students a chance to work with film professionals and star in a feature film.

=== International links ===
The school is linked to schools across the world. Sandbach School gained the International Schools Award from the British Council, it has been granted from September 2007 to September 2010. In October 2007 the senior rugby squad toured Italy.

The school band toured in Germany in October 2005, and formed a partnership with Leibniz Oberschule in Berlin. Since 2005, an exchange visit to Berlin and regular contact via e-mail and video conferencing has helped Sandbach pupils in their German studies. The school also has a long-term partnership with Fukien Secondary School in Kowloon, Hong Kong where some pupils performed in October 2006 and again - with a performance of "The King of Denmark" - in 2013. The schools collaborated at the Edinburgh Fringe in an event at the Royal College of Physicians of Edinburgh, where a 50-strong group from Fukien met over 100 Sandbach pupils and staff. Former Sandbach pupils have visited Fukien and taught there during their gap year, and a former Sandbach School teacher has also taught at Fukien.

Sandbach School has toured to Dover High School in New Hampshire, sending football tours to Dover to play them and other schools in the area. In October 2004 and October 2007, joint football and music tours were arranged. Additionally, school has links with the National Youth Drama School in New Zealand, and Hugh McRoberts High School, in Vancouver, British Columbia, Canada

== Performance ==
=== Attainment ===
Attainment of boys attending Sandbach against local authority and England average
Comparing	Sandbach School	% Local Authority Average	England Average
English & maths GCSEs	49%	46%	45%
Staying in education or entering employment	100%	95%	94%
Attainment 8 (based on how well pupils have performed in up to 8 qualifications)	48.7%	46.8%	46.3%
EBacc average point score (pupil's average point scores across the 5 pillars of the English Baccalaureate)	4.10	4.02	4.05

== Notable former pupils ==
- Alfred Barratt, barrister and philosopher
- Will Cliff, Sale Sharks rugby player
- Iain Coldham, professor of organic chemistry at the University of Sheffield
- Vero Charles Driffield, chemical engineer
- Sir David Eastwood, vice-chancellor of the University of Birmingham
- Paul Franklin, visual effects supervisor
- James Gaskell, Wasps RFC and England rugby player
- Wilton Hack, Australian artist, pastor, traveller, utopist, and theosophist
- Sol Heras, TV actor
- Tom Holmes, Nottingham RFC rugby player
- Lee Imiolek, Yorkshire Carnegie rugby player
- Duncan McCargo, professor of political science at the University of Copenhagen
- Nick Powell, professional footballer
- Lee Oakes, TV actor
- Gordon Slynn, Baron Slynn of Hadley, Second Senior Lord of Appeal in Ordinary 2000–2002
- Nigel Stonier, record producer and songwriter
- William Tempest, fashion designer
- John Waite, BBC Radio 4 broadcaster
- Paul Ware, former professional footballer
- Peter Warren, archaeologist and emeritus professor at the University of Bristol
- David Wrench (rugby union) player for Harlequins FC and England
- Ewan Ashman, rugby union player for Sale Sharks and Scotland

== See also ==
- Listed buildings in Sandbach
