= Lions Youth Brass Band =

English youth band

The Lions Youth Brass is a youth band based in Sandbach, England. Founded in 1989, the band is named after several Lions Clubs in the region that have sponsored it since its founding. With over 100 members, the organisation contains three bands for players of different skill levels; in ascending order, these are the Debut band, the academy band, and the Youth band. The age range of the organisation ranges between 6 and 18 and rehearse at Sandbach School every Tuesday.

All three bands compete at various competitions including the National Youth Brass Band Championships. The Youth Band compete in the Championship Section where they were placed second in 2012 and 2014. The Academy Band compete in the Junior section and gained first place in 202022. The Debut Band in the Beginner section, where they picked up the "Band with Most Potential" prize in 2014,2015 and 2016.

The Youth Band have toured various locations in Europe which have included the Czech Republic, Republic of Ireland and Spain. The band have also made numerous recordings.

Players developed by Lions Youth Brass have gone on to play with famous bands such as Black Dyke Mills Band, Foden's Band and Tredegar Town Band. Over the years they have had a close relationship with the Roberts Bakery Band with many current and former players performing with the Sandbach-based band.

The organisation's current musical directors are Ian Raisbeck (Youth Band), Pete McDonough (Academy Band) and John Barber and Katie Raisbeck (Debut Band). They are also assisted by tutors Derek Gardener, Chris Taylor, Daya Gill and Paul Hughes.
