= Congleton (borough) =

Local government district in Cheshire, England

Coordinates: 53°9′N 2°18′W

Borough of Congleton
- Shown within Cheshire
- History
  - Origin: Congleton Municipal Borough; Alsager Urban District; Middlewich Urban District; Sandbach Urban District; Congleton Rural District.
  - Created: 1 April 1974
  - Abolished: 31 March 2009
  - Succeeded by: Cheshire East
- Status: Non-metropolitan district
- ONS code: 13UC
  - HQ: Westfields, Sandbach

Congleton was, from 1974 to 2009, a local government district with borough status in Cheshire, England. It included the towns of Congleton, Alsager, Middlewich and Sandbach. The headquarters of the borough council were located in Sandbach.

== History ==
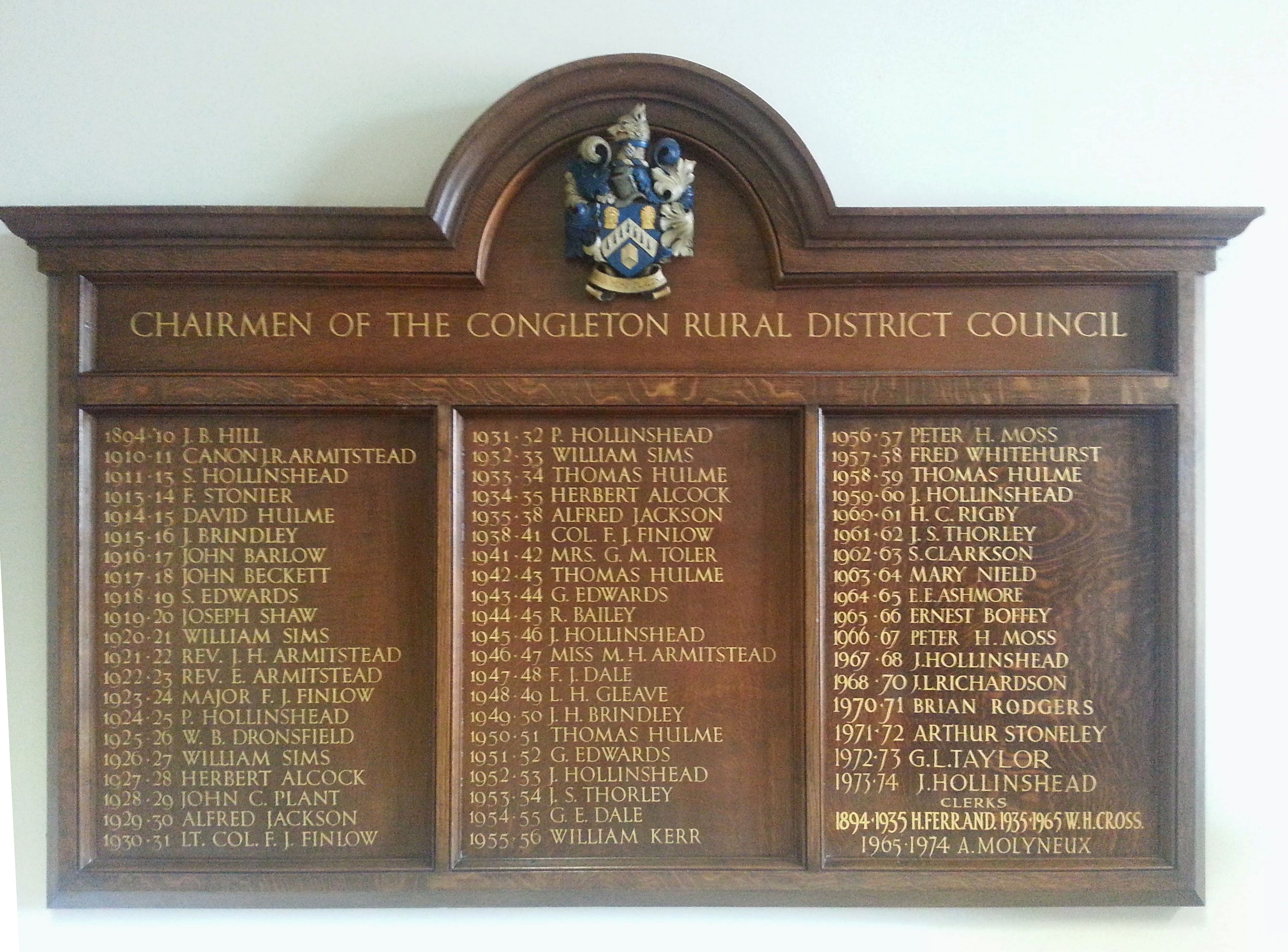
Chairmen of Congleton Rural District Council (1894-1974)

The borough was formed on 1 April 1974 under the Local Government Act 1972 by the merger of the former Corporation of Congleton, the urban districts of Alsager, Middlewich and Sandbach, and the Congleton Rural District. The new district was awarded borough status from its creation.

In 2006 the Department for Communities and Local Government considered reorganising Cheshire's administrative structure as part of the 2009 structural changes to local government in England. The decision to merge the boroughs of Congleton, Macclesfield, and Crewe and Nantwich to create a single unitary authority was announced on 25 July 2007, following a consultation period in which a proposal to create a single Cheshire unitary authority was rejected.

The Borough of Congleton was abolished on 31 March 2009, with the area becoming part of the unitary authority of Cheshire East on 1 April 2009.

== Civil parishes ==
Congleton was divided into 23 civil parishes and included no unparished areas. Of the 23 civil parishes, four were administered at this level of local government by town councils: Alsager, Middlewich, Sandbach, and Congleton; with the remainder having parish councils. There are two pairs of civil parishes that are grouped together so that they share a parish council. These are Hulme Walfield and Somerford Booths, whose single parish council is called "Hulme Walfield and Somerford Booths Parish Council", and Newbold Astbury and Moreton cum Alcumlow, whose single parish council is called "Newbold Astbury-cum-Moreton Parish Council".

The following civil parishes were included in the borough:

- Alsager (town)
- Arclid
- Betchton
- Bradwall
- Brereton
- Church Lawton
- Congleton (town)
- Cranage
- Goostrey
- Hassall
- Holmes Chapel
- Hulme Walfield
- Middlewich (town)
- Moreton cum Alcumlow
- Moston
- Newbold Astbury
- Odd Rode
- Sandbach (town)
- Smallwood
- Somerford
- Somerford Booths
- Swettenham
- Twemlow

== Demographics ==
The resident population of the borough, as measured in the 2001 Census, was 90,655, of which 49 per cent were male and 51 per cent were female.

=== Religion ===
The percentage of people of each religion in the borough (trom the Census 2001):

Stated religion	Percentage
Christian	81.46%
Buddhist	0.12%
Hindu	0.11%
Jewish	0.06%
Muslim	0.17%
Sikh	0.04%
Other religions	0.16%
No religion	11.46%
Religion not stated	6.43%

== Political control ==
The town of Congleton had been a municipal borough from 1836 to 1974 with a borough council. The first elections to the new Congleton Borough created under the Local Government Act 1972 were held in 1973, initially operating as a shadow authority until the new arrangements came into effect on 1 April 1974. Political control of the council from 1974 until its abolition in 2009 was as follows:

Party in control	Years
No overall control	1974–1976
Conservative	1976–1982
No overall control	1982–1983
Conservative	1983–1986
No overall control	1986–1991
Liberal Democrats	1991–1992
No overall control	1992–1994
Liberal Democrats	1994–2002
No overall control	2002–2003
Conservative	2003–2009

=== Leadership ===
The leaders of the council from 1987 were:

Councillor	Party	From	To
Dennis Round	Liberal	1987	14 July 1987
Linda Short	Liberal Democrats	1987	14 December 2000
Rod Fletcher	Liberal Democrats	2001	2002
Roland Domleo	Conservative	2002	31 March 2009

=== Composition ===
The political composition of the council at its abolition in 2009 was:

Party	Councillors
Conservative	25
Liberal Democrat	13
Middlewich First	6
Independent	4

== Premises ==
The council was based at Westfields on Middlewich Road in Sandbach. This was a large nineteenth-century house which had been bought in 1960 by the Congleton Rural District Council, one of the council's predecessors. In 2005–2007 a replacement headquarters building, also called Westfields, was built in front of the old house, which was then demolished. The new building was formally opened on 25 January 2008. After Congleton Borough Council's abolition, Westfields became the headquarters for the new Cheshire East Council.

== Alderman and Freeman of the Borough ==
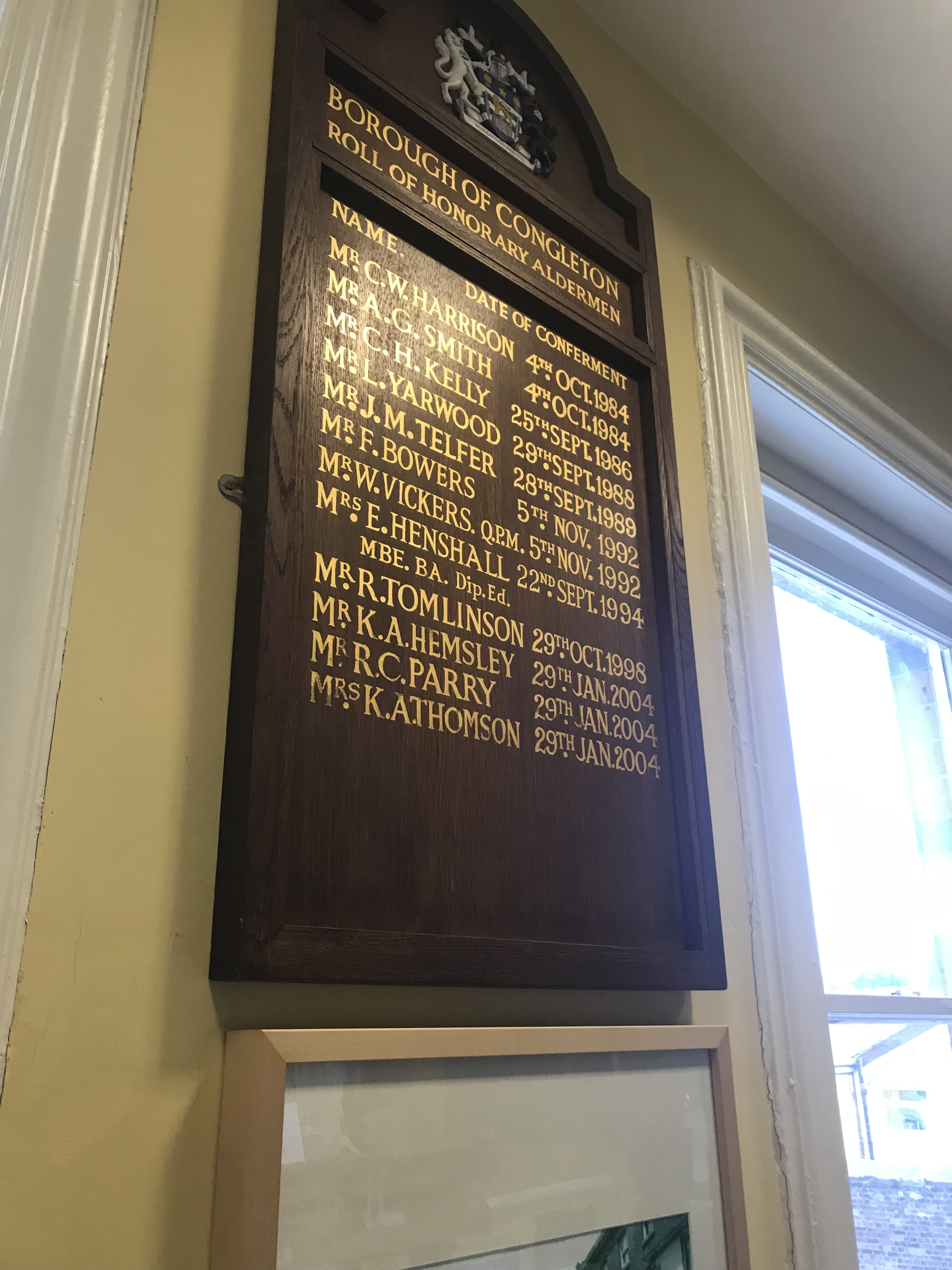
Borough of Congleton roll of honorary Alderman plaque

The following people and military units received the Freedom of the Borough of Congleton or were an Alderman of the Borough of Congleton.

=== Individuals ===
- C. W. Harrison (Alderman 4 October 1984) (Note: Source Borough of Congleton roll of honorary Alderman plaque photo)
- A. G. Smith (Alderman 4 October 1984)
- C. H. Kelly (Alderman 25 September 1986)
- L. Yarwood (Alderman 29 September 1988)
- J. M. Telfer (Alderman 28 September 1989)
- F. Bowers (Alderman 5 November 1992)
- W. Vickers (Alderman 5 November 1992)
- E. Henshall (Alderman 22 September 1994)
- R. Tomlinson (Alderman 29 October 1998)
- R. C. Parry (Alderman 29 January 2004)
- K. A. Hemsley (Alderman 29 January 2004)
- K. A. Thompson (Alderman 29 January 2004)
- M. J. Cooper (Alderman 2009)
- T. Farrell (Alderman 2009)
- R. A. Giltrap (Alderman 2009)
- L. Morris (Alderman 2009)
- F. Walton (Alderman 2009)
- D. Brown (Alderman 2009)
- R. M. Domleo (Alderman 2009)
- P. J. Edwards (Alderman 2009)
- R. I. Fletcher (Alderman 2009)
- D. I. Hough (Alderman 2009)
- G. Chambers (Freeman 2009)

=== Military Units ===
- The Cheshire Yeomanry: 1906.
- The Cheshire Regiment: 1969.
- First Battalion of the Mercian Regiment:???
- First Battalion of the Mercian Regiment (Freeman ???)

== Council elections ==
- 1973 Congleton Borough Council election
- 1976 Congleton Borough Council election (New ward boundaries)
- 1979 Congleton Borough Council election
- 1980 Congleton Borough Council election
- 1982 Congleton Borough Council election
- 1983 Congleton Borough Council election
- 1984 Congleton Borough Council election
- 1986 Congleton Borough Council election
- 1987 Congleton Borough Council election
- 1988 Congleton Borough Council election
- 1990 Congleton Borough Council election
- 1991 Congleton Borough Council election (Borough boundary changes took place but the number of seats remained the same)
- 1992 Congleton Borough Council election
- 1994 Congleton Borough Council election
- 1995 Congleton Borough Council election
- 1996 Congleton Borough Council election
- 1998 Congleton Borough Council election
- 1999 Congleton Borough Council election (New ward boundaries)
- 2000 Congleton Borough Council election
- 2002 Congleton Borough Council election
- 2003 Congleton Borough Council election
- 2004 Congleton Borough Council election
- 2006 Congleton Borough Council election
- 2007 Congleton Borough Council election

=== Results maps ===
2002 results map

2003 results map

2004 results map

2006 results map

2007 results map

=== By-election results ===
Congleton North By-Election 10 August 2000
Party	Candidate	Votes	%	±%
Labour	David Atkin	303	50.9	+9.6
Liberal Democrats		156	26.2	−24.9
Conservative		136	22.9	+15.3
Majority		147	24.7	
Turnout		595	21.6	
Labour gain from Liberal Democrats		Swing		

Congleton North West By-Election 10 August 2000
Party	Candidate	Votes	%	±%
Conservative	Sue Appleton	275	37.2	+11.3
Liberal Democrats		251	34.0	−8.3
Labour		213	28.8	−3.0
Majority		24	3.2	
Turnout		739	24.6	
Conservative gain from Liberal Democrats		Swing		

Congleton North By-Election 26 August 2004 (2)
Party	Candidate	Votes	%	±%
Conservative		191		
Conservative		174		
Labour		142		
Labour		133		
Liberal Democrats	Simon Davey	111		
Liberal Democrats	Paul Jones	108		
Turnout		859	15.6	
Conservative gain from Labour		Swing		
Conservative gain from Labour		Swing		

Congleton West By-Election 28 October 2004
Party	Candidate	Votes	%	±%
Conservative		491	53.7	−1.5
Liberal Democrats	Simon Davey	275	30.1	+6.2
Labour		148	16.2	−4.8
Majority		261	23.6	
Turnout		914	20.5	
Conservative hold		Swing		

Alsager Central By-Election 17 February 2005
Party	Candidate	Votes	%	±%
Liberal Democrats	Julian Burgess	532	56.1	−14.2
Conservative	Warwick Till	365	38.5	+8.8
Labour	William Howell	52	5.5	+5.5
Majority		167	17.6	
Turnout		949	34.5	
Liberal Democrats hold		Swing		

Congleton North West By-Election 24 November 2005
Party	Candidate	Votes	%	±%
Liberal Democrats	Simon Davey	341	54.8	+54.8
Conservative	Matthew Carey	191	30.7	−13.3
Labour	Lisa Bossons	90	14.5	−9.2
Majority		150	24.1	
Turnout		622	21.0	
Liberal Democrats gain from Conservative		Swing		

Sandbach West By-Election 18 October 2007
Party	Candidate	Votes	%	±%
Conservative	Stella Furlong	445	45.1	+3.6
Liberal Democrats	Patrick Darnes	382	38.7	−3.1
Labour	Keith Haines	160	16.2	−0.5
Majority		63	6.4	
Turnout		987	19.2	
Conservative hold		Swing		

== See also ==
- Education in Congleton Borough
