= Sandbach Town Hall =

Municipal building in Sandbach, Cheshire, England

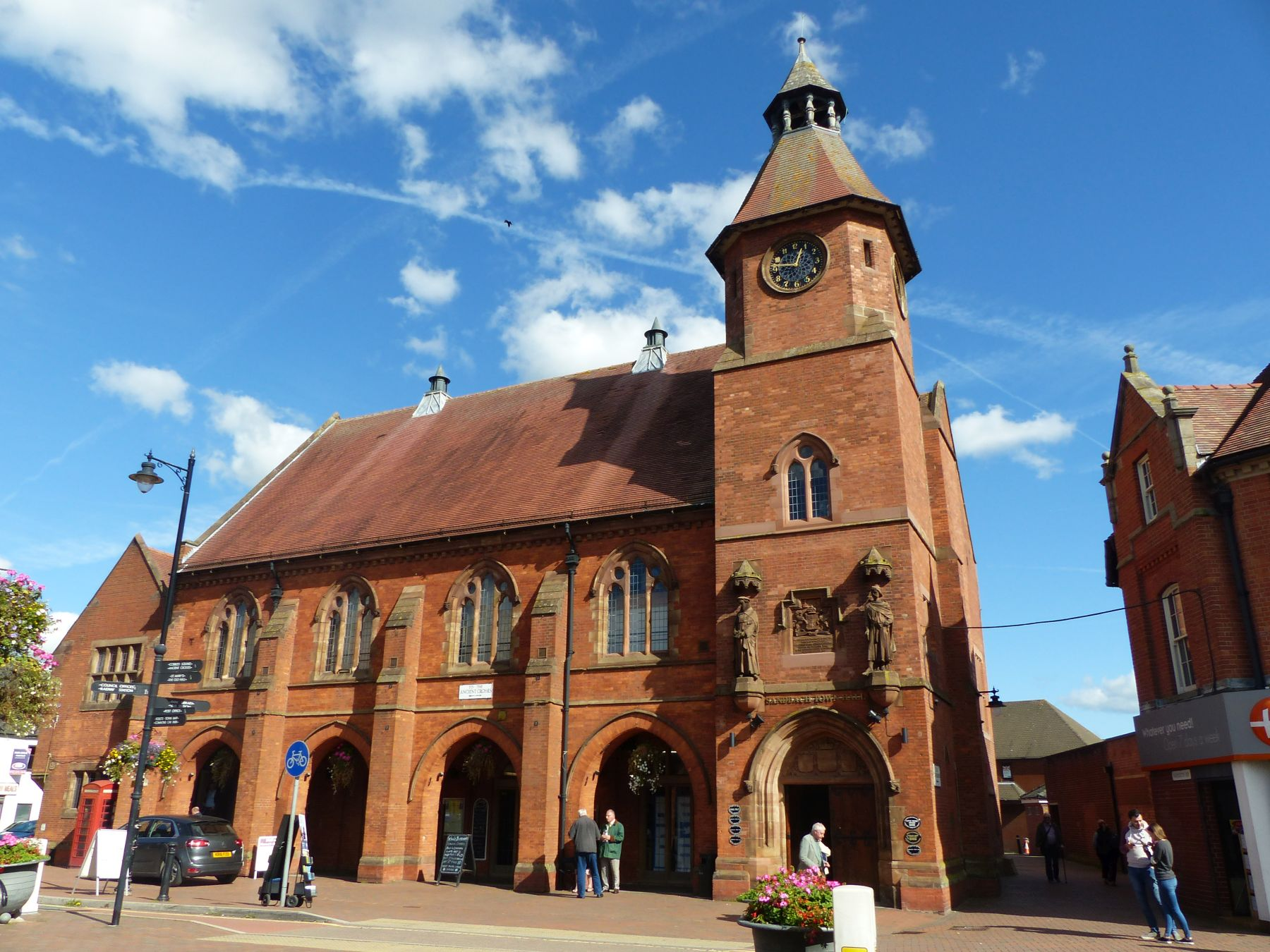
- Sandbach Town Hall

- Shown in Cheshire
- 53.1445°N 2.3634°W
- Location: High Street, Sandbach

History
- Built: 1890

Site notes
- Architect: Thomas Bower
- Architectural style: Gothic Revival style

Listed Building – Grade II
- Official name: Town Hall and Market Hall
- Designated: 27 April 1978
- Reference no.: 1130352

Sandbach Town Hall is a municipal building in the High Street in Sandbach, Cheshire, England. The structure, which is the meeting place of Sandbach Town Council, is a Grade II listed building.

== History ==
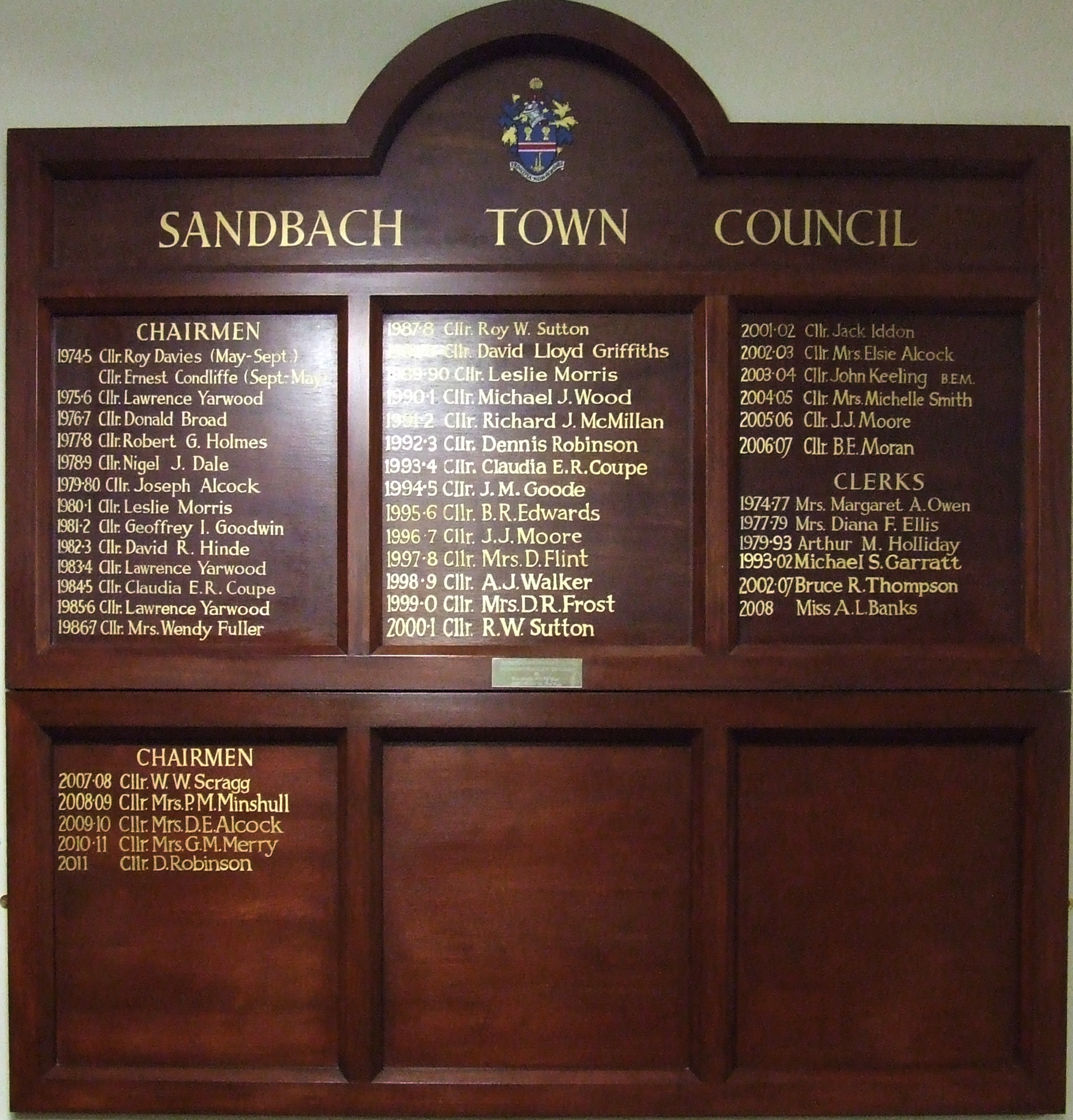
A board inside the town hall showing the chairmen and town clerks of the Town Council

The first town hall in Sandbach was a medieval structure located in the Market Square. On the High Street side, it was arcaded on the ground floor so that markets could be held, while on the Market Square side it had a village lock-up at one end and shops at the other end; there was an assembly hall on the first floor. The lawyer and author, Thomas Hughes, served as a judge at county court hearings in the building.

The site for the current town hall, further to the northwest along the High Street, was donated by the lord of the manor, Lord Crewe: it had been occupied by a barber's shop and a private house. The foundation stone for the new building was laid on 2 July 1889. It was designed by Thomas Bower in the Gothic Revival style, built by John Stringer in red brick with stone dressings at a cost of £5,000 and was officially opened by Lord Crewe on 28 October 1890.

The design involved an asymmetrical main frontage with six bays facing onto the High Street; the central section of four bays featured arches on the ground floor and three-light mullioned windows on the first floor. The left hand bay, which was slightly set back, featured mullioned and transomed windows on the ground and first floors with a gable above. The right hand bay featured a four-stage tower with an arch on the ground floor, a panel with the Crewe family coat of arms flanked by statues on the first floor, a two-light mullioned window on the second floor, an octagonal shaped stage with a clock on the third floor and a pyramidal roof with a cupola above. The statues, which were paid for by Lord Crewe, depicted, on the left, the Lord Chief Justice of the King's Bench, Sir Ranulph Crewe, and, on the right, the early Norman lord of the manor, Bigot de Loges, who was referred to in the Domesday Book. Internally, the principal room was the ballroom. The clock, a timepiece by A. & H. Rowley of Theobalds Road, was given by a Mrs Jane Court in memory of her family. Following the completion of the new town hall, the old town hall was demolished in 1891.

Sandbach had been made a local government district in 1862, administered by a local board. Such districts were reconstituted as urban districts in 1894. The urban district council held its meetings in the town hall, although the town clerk was based in offices at 3 Crewe Road. Rallies were held at the town hall to identify potential recruits for the 15th and 16th (Service) Battalions of the Cheshire Regiment throughout 1915 during the First World War and concerts and other events were held to raise funds for the Wings for Victory Week during the Second World War. The town hall continued to be used as an events venue after the war and performers included the soul and rhythm and blues singer, Jimmy Powell, in April 1963.

The town hall ceased to be the local seat of government when the enlarged Congleton Borough Council was formed at Westfields in Middlewich Road in Sandbach in 1974. Sandbach Town Council took over the management of the building in 2012, and, following the completion of an extensive programme of refurbishment works which included improvements to the main frontage, the town hall was officially re-opened by the mayor, Councillor Mike Benson, on 19 February 2014.

The Mercian Regiment received the Freedom of Sandbach at the town hall on 29 June 2014 and the BBC programme Any Questions? was broadcast from the town hall on 8 July 2016. In October 2020, Sandbach Town Council decided to move its main meeting place from the Sandbach Literary Institute to Sandbach Town Hall.

== See also ==
- Listed buildings in Sandbach
