= Middlewich High School =

Coordinates: 53.190°N 2.448°W

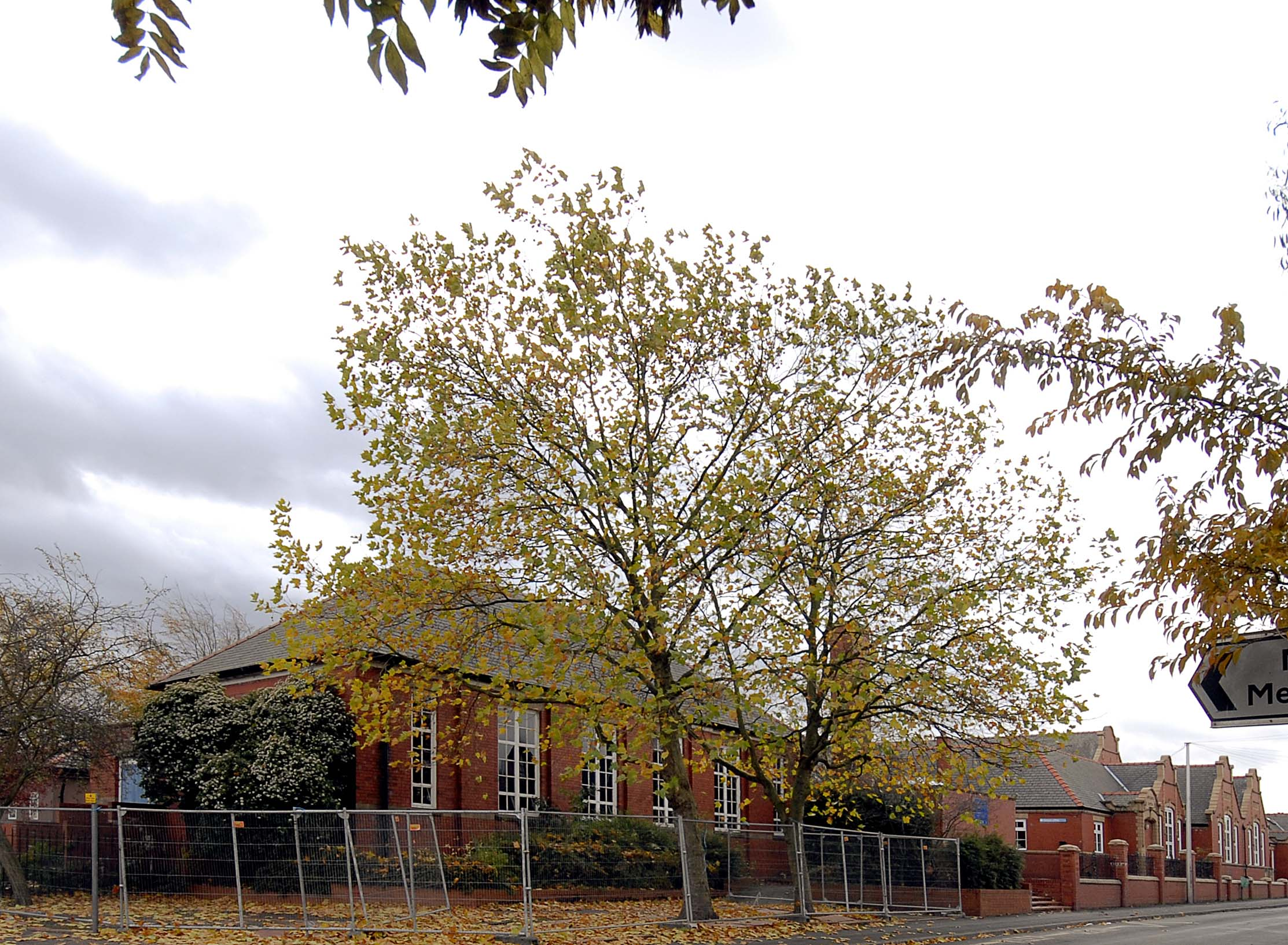

Location
- King Edward Street; Middlewich, Cheshire; England

Information
- Type: Academy
- Motto: Achievement for all
- Established: 1906
- Local authority: Cheshire East
- Trust: The Sir John Brunner Foundation
- Department for Education URN: 148693 Tables
- Ofsted: Reports
- Headteacher: Mrs Lydia Naylor
- Gender: Co-educational
- Age: 11 to 16
- Enrolment: 708
- Houses: Bostock, Kinderton, Newton, Ravenscroft, Stanthorne
- Colour: Grey
- Website: https://www.mhs.school/

Middlewich High School is a co-educational secondary school located in Middlewich, Cheshire, England.

It is a school for 11- to 16-year-olds, and had 708 pupils on roll as of the last OFSTED report, less than the average comprehensive. In its last OFSTED report, it achieved Good. 98.6% of pupils are of white British origin and no pupils take English as an additional language. 10.7% of pupils have Special Educational Needs (SEN). In 2006 Middlewich High School celebrated its centenary. In 2007 it achieved its best GCSE results: 71% at A* - C.

The school is one of the partner high schools of Sir John Deane's Sixth Form College, and sends around 30% of its Year 11 leavers there every September.

Previously a community school administered by Cheshire East Council, in February 2022 Middlewich High School converted to academy status. It is now sponsored by The Sir John Brunner Foundation.
