= Cheshire East Council =

Local authority in Cheshire, England

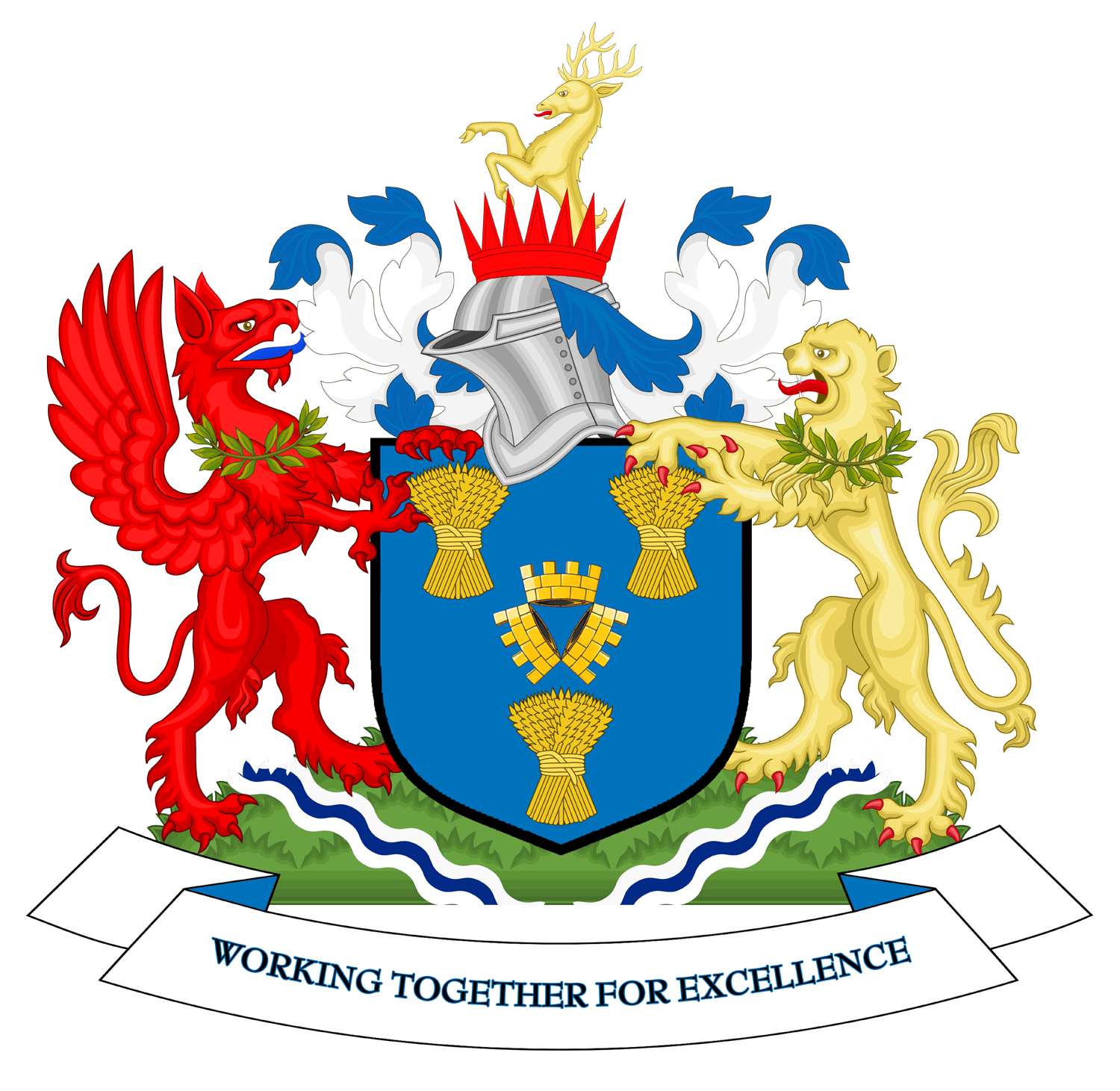
- Coat of arms

- Corporate logo

Type
- Type: Unitary authority

History
- Founded: 1 April 2009

Leadership
- Mayor: Judy Snowball, Labour since 13 May 2026
- Leader: Nick Mannion, Labour since 17 July 2024
- Chief Executive (interim): Paul Walker since 14 October 2026

Structure
- Seats: 82 councillors
- Political groups: Administration (41) Labour (28) Residents of Wilmslow (4) Alderley Edge First (1) Independent (8) Other parties (41) Conservative (32) Green (1) Liberal Democrats (1) Reform UK (1) Independent (6)
- Length of term: 4 years

Elections
- Voting system: Plurality-at-large
- Last election: 4 May 2023
- Next election: 6 May 2027

Motto
- Working together for excellence

Website
- cheshireeast.gov.uk

Cheshire East Council is the local authority for Cheshire East, a local government district with borough status in the ceremonial county of Cheshire, England. The council is a unitary authority, being a district council which also performs the functions of a county council. It has been under no overall control since 2019, being run by a coalition of Labour, local parties and independent councillors. It is currently led by Labour councillor Nick Mannion.

In 2026, the council became part of the Cheshire and Warrington Combined Authority.

== History ==
The council and district were created in 2009, covering the combined area of the former districts of Congleton, Crewe and Nantwich and Macclesfield. The new council also took on the functions of the abolished Cheshire County Council in the area. Cheshire East is both a non-metropolitan district and a non-metropolitan county, but there is no separate county council; instead the district council performs both district and county functions, making it a unitary authority. For the purposes of lieutenancy and shrievalty, Cheshire East remains part of the ceremonial county of Cheshire.

The new district was awarded borough status from its creation on 1 April 2009, allowing the chair of the council to take the title of mayor. The council's full legal name is therefore Cheshire East Borough Council, although it styles itself Cheshire East Council.

In February 2026, the council became part of the Cheshire and Warrington Combined Authority.

== Governance ==
The council provides both district-level and county-level functions. In its capacity as a district council it is a billing authority collecting Council Tax and business rates, and it is responsible for town planning, housing, waste collection and environmental health. In its capacity as a county council it is a local education authority, and is responsible for social services, libraries and waste disposal. The whole borough is covered by civil parishes, which form a second tier of local government.

=== Political control ===
Until May 2019 the council was controlled by the Conservatives. At the 2019 elections the council was left under no overall control. On 22 May 2019, the newly elected councillors met for the first time and elected Labour's Sam Corcoran as leader, after the party came to an agreement with independent councillors. A similar coalition, still led by Corcoran, continued to form the council's administration following the 2023 elections. Corcoran stepped down in 2024 and was replaced by Macclesfield councillor Nick Mannion.

The first election to the council was held in 2008, initially acting as a shadow authority alongside the outgoing authorities until it came into its powers on 1 April 2009. Political control of the council since 2009 has been as follows:

Party in control	Years
Conservative	2009–2019
No overall control	2019–present

=== Leadership ===
The role of mayor is largely ceremonial in Cheshire East; the mayor is appointed annually and a list of mayors since 2009 is shown on the council's website.

Political leadership is provided by the leader of the council. The first leader, Wesley Fitzgerald, had been the leader of the old Macclesfield Borough Council from 2004 to 2008. The leaders of Cheshire East Council since 2009 have been:

Councillor	Party	From	To
Wesley Fitzgerald	Conservative	1 Apr 2009	Apr 2012
Michael Jones	Conservative	16 May 2012	25 Feb 2016
Rachel Bailey	Conservative	25 Feb 2016	May 2019
Sam Corcoran	Labour	22 May 2019	17 Jul 2024
Nick Mannion	Labour	17 Jul 2024	

=== Composition ===
Following the 2023 election, and subsequent by-elections and changes of allegiance up to September 2026, the composition of the council was as follows:

Party	Councillors
Conservative	32
Labour	28
Residents of Wilmslow	4
Alderley Edge First	1
Green	1
Liberal Democrats	1
Reform	1
Independent	14
Total	82

Eight of the independent councillors sit with the local parties Residents of Wilmslow and Alderley First as the "Independent Group", which forms the council's administration in coalition with Labour. The other six independents (one of whom describes herself as "independent socialist") do not form part of a group. The next election is due in 2027.

== Premises ==
The council's administrative offices are at Delamere House in Crewe and Macclesfield Town Hall. The council's previous main administrative offices were at Westfields on Middlewich Road in Sandbach. Westfields was opened in 2008 as the headquarters of the former Congleton Borough Council, one of Cheshire East's predecessors. Council and committee meetings are held at various venues across the borough, including Crewe Municipal Buildings, Macclesfield Town Hall, and Sandbach Town Hall.

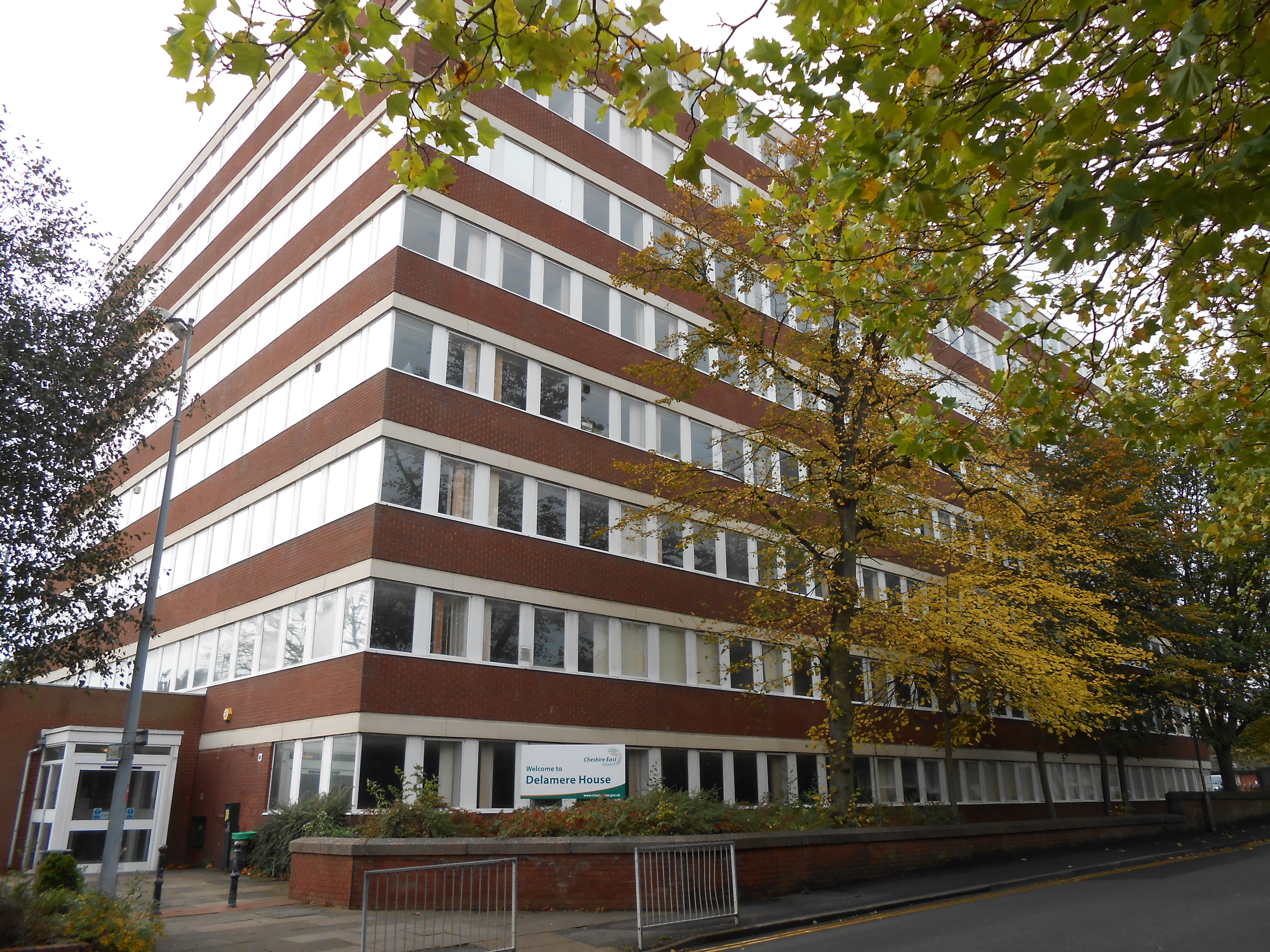
Delamere House: Council's offices in Crewe

In 2023 the council decided to close Westfields and make its existing building at Delamere House in Crewe the headquarters instead. Delamere House was completed in 1974 as a joint facility for both the old Crewe and Nantwich Borough Council and Cheshire County Council, and has served as Cheshire East Council's local offices in Crewe since the reorganisation in 2009. Westfields closed in December 2024.

== Elections ==
Since the last boundary changes in 2011 the council has comprised 82 councillors representing 52 wards, with each ward electing one, two or three councillors. Elections are held every four years.

== Arms ==
Coat of arms of Cheshire East Council
Notes Granted 16 December 2009 by the College of Arms. Crest Out of an Eastern crown Gules a demi stag Or. Escutcheon Azure three mural crowns conjoined in pairle reversed between three garbs Or. Supporters Dexter a griffin Gules sinister a lion Or each gorged with a wreath of laurel Proper. Compartment A grassy mount Vert charged to the dexter with a bendlet wavy Azure fimbriated Argent and to the sinister with a bendlet wavy sinister Azure fimbriated Argent. Motto Working Together For Excellence Badge A garb Or enfiling an Eastern crown Gules.
