= Listed buildings in Middlewich =

Middlewich is a town within the unitary authority of Cheshire East, England. It contains 40 buildings that are recorded in the National Heritage List for England as designated listed buildings. Of these, two are listed at Grade II*, the middle grade, and the others are at Grade II. The history of the area goes back to the Roman era when it was important for the production of salt. The salt industry in the region has continued since then, but it is not reflected in its listed buildings, other than by the canals. The Trent and Mersey Canal was opened in 1777, and the listed buildings associated with it consist of locks, mileposts, and other buildings and structures. The Middlewich Branch of the Shropshire Union Canal dates from 1829, and the listed buildings associated with this include aqueducts, locks, bridges, and a lock keeper's house. Otherwise, the listed buildings in the town are those usually found in towns, including a church with a sundial in the churchyard, houses, shops, a war memorial and a former mill. Outside the town, the area is rural, and the listed buildings include farmhouses and farm buildings.

== Key ==
Grade	Criteria
II*	Particularly important buildings of more than special interest
II	Buildings of national importance and special interest

== Buildings ==
Name and location	Photograph	Date	Notes	Grade
St Michael and All Angels Church; 53.19250°N 2.44475°W		12th century	The church contains some Norman features, but most of it is Perpendicular in style. It was restored in 1857–60 by Joseph Clarke. The church is built in sandstone, and consists of a nave, north and south aisles, a south porch, and a chancel with side chapels. At the west end is a crenellated tower with two clock faces.	II*
Newton Old Hall; 53.19033°N 2.44982°W	—	1604	A brick house with a stone-slate roof. It has an L-shaped plan, and is in two storeys with attics. The windows are a mix of sashes and casements. Against the right gable is a 19th-century lean-to kitchen.	II
Kinderton Mill; 53.19350°N 2.44314°W		1609	Originally a water-powered corn mill, this has later been used as a workshop. It is built in brick with a slate roof, and was extended in the 18th and 19th centuries. The older part is in three storeys, and has buttresses, a stone-coped gable with ball finials, and mullioned windows. The later part is in two storeys and has a three bay front.	II
33 and 33A Lewin Street; 53.19066°N 2.44333°W	—	1640	Originating as a cottage, later converted into two shops, it is timber-framed with plaster panels, and has a roof of asbestos slates. The building is in two storeys, with shop fronts in the ground floor. The windows are casements.	II
64 St Ann's Road; 53.18987°N 2.44887°W		Late 17th century	A brick house with a slate roof. It is in two storeys with an attic, and has a three-bay front. To the left of the central doorway is a two-storey canted bay window with stone mullions. To the right is a camber-headed casement window in each storey, and there is a similar window above the doorway over which is a pediment. In the attic are two gabled dormers.	II*
66 St Ann's Road; 53.18980°N 2.44880°W		Late 17th century (probable)	A rendered house with a slate roof, in two storeys with a cellar. At the corners are flush quoins. The doors and windows all have cambered heads, the windows also have moulded keystones and stone sills.	II
Briar Pool Farmhouse; 53.18267°N 2.41418°W	—	Late 17th century	A brick farmhouse that was altered in the 19th and 20th centuries. It is in two storeys, and has a two-bay front. The windows have stone sills and wedge lintels. Inside the farmhouse are retained beams and an inglenook.	II
Sutton Hall Farmhouse; 53.17603°N 2.44993°W	—	Late 17th century (probable)	The farmhouse was extended in the 18th and again in the 19th century with the addition of a rear wing. The house is in brick with a slate roof on the original part and asbestos on the rear wing. It is in two storeys and has a four-bay front. The windows have stone sills and wedge lintels. Inside the farmhouse is an inglenook with a bressumer.	II
Well, Newton Old Hall; 53.19031°N 2.45017°W	—	18th century (probable, or earlier)	The well consists of a circular shaft with a brick lining, and a brick parapet. It continues to be usable.	II
Newton Hall; 53.19021°N 2.44967°W	—	Mid-18th century	A brick house with a slate roof, consisting of a three-bay wing and a two-bay cross-wing. It is in two storeys, and has a pedimented Tuscan doorcase. The windows are sashes with stone sills and wedge lintels.	II
62 St Ann's Road; 53.19007°N 2.44904°W		Late 18th century	A brick house with a slate roof, it is two storeys with an attic, and has a three-bay front. The windows are sashes with stone sills and wedge lintels. In the attics are two gabled dormers. There is a later elaborate timber porch in Gothick style with sidelights, bargeboards and a finial.	II
Bridge No. 167; 53.18702°N 2.44057°W		Late 18th century (probable)	An accommodation bridge over the Trent and Mersey Canal. It is in brick and consists of a narrow segmental arch, and has a brick parapet with stone coping.	II
Sundial; 53.19235°N 2.44454°W		Late 18th century (probable)	The sundial is in the churchyard of St Michael and All Angels Church. It is in stone and consists of a vase baluster on a circular stone step with a brick base. It has a copper dial, and the gnomon is broken.	II
King's Lock; 53.18689°N 2.44052°W		1777	The lock on the Trent and Mersey Canal is built in brick and stone. The gates are timber; the upper gate is single and the lower gate is double. There is a wooden footbridge carried by a cast iron arch.	II
Rumps Lock; 53.17653°N 2.42866°W		1777	The lock on the Trent and Mersey Canal is built in brick and stone. The gates are timber; the upper gate is single and the lower gate is double. The footbridge has been renewed.	II
Three locks and a dry dock 53.19089°N 2.43962°W		1777	The three locks with two linking basins are on the Trent and Mersey Canal. They have walls of brick and stone with timber gates and footbridges. The dry dock dates probably from the late 18th century.	II
Stables and sawpit house 53.18920°N 2.44127°W	—	c. 1777	Service buildings for the Trent and Mersey Canal, the sawpit house probably dates from the original building, the stables from the early 19th century. They are both in brick with slate roofs, and are in a single storey. The sawpit extends along the full length of its building. Above the stable is a loft.	II
28 Wheelock Street; 53.19291°N 2.44741°W		c. 1800	Originally a house, later a shop with accommodation, it is built in brick with stone dressings and has a slate roof. The shop is in three storeys, and has a three-bay front. In the centre is a doorway with three-quarter Tuscan columns and a pediment. To the left is a shop window with a moulded architrave. The other windows are sashes with stone sills and wedge lintels.	II
Canal milepost 53.19948°N 2.45311°W		1819	The canal milepost is in cast iron. It has a tapering circular stem with a domed cap. It carries a curved plate inscribed with the distances in miles to Preston Brook and Shardlow.	II
Canal milepost 53.18913°N 2.44066°W		1819	The canal milepost is in cast iron. It has a tapering circular stem with a domed cap. It carries a curved plate inscribed with the distances in miles to Preston Brook and Shardlow.	II
Canal milepost 53.17689°N 2.42897°W		1819	The canal milepost is in cast iron. It has a tapering circular inscribed stem with a domed cap. It carries a curved plate inscribed with the distances in miles to Preston Brook and Shardlow.	II
House and canal office 53.18923°N 2.44067°W		c. 1820	The building is in brick with slate roofs, and it was extended in about 1840. The house is in two storeys and has a three-bay front. It has an elaborate cast iron porch flanked by French windows, and with casement windows in the upper floor. The office to the right is in a single storey, and is joined to the house by a round-arched passage with a carved head keystone. On the right side facing the canal is an oriel window on a sandstone corbel; it is gabled with ornate bargeboards.	II
25 Queen Street; 53.19158°N 2.44557°W		Early 19th century (probable)	A brick house with a slate roof in two storeys. The front facing the road and the entrance front on the left side both have two bays. The doorcase is pedimented, and the windows are a mix of sashes and casements. At the top of the house is a parapet, rising at the corners to carry urn finials.	II
Aqueduct over Nantwich Road; 53.18840°N 2.45444°W		1829	The aqueduct carries the Middlewich Branch of the Shropshire Union Canal over Nantwich Road. It is built in brick and consists of a deep segmental arch, and has a canted abutment with stone copings.	II
Aqueduct over River Wheelock; 53.18829°N 2.45683°W	—	1829	The aqueduct carries the Middlewich Branch of the Shropshire Union Canal over the River Wheelock. It is built in brick and consists of a wide semicircular arch with voussoirs. It has curved parapets ending in circular stone piers with stone copings. Part of the aqueduct is in Stanthorne.	II
Bridge No. 28; 53.18769°N 2.45032°W		1829	The bridge carries a footpath over the Middlewich Branch of the Shropshire Union Canal. It is in brick, and consists of a single slightly skewed basket arch with curved abutments. There are brick parapets and square piers with stone copings at the ends.	II
Bridge No. 30; 53.18753°N 2.44501°W		1829	The bridge carries St Ann's Road over the Middlewich Branch of the Shropshire Union Canal. It has brick parapets with square piers at the ends.	II
Bridge No. 31; 53.18756°N 2.44353°W		1829	The bridge carries Sutton Lane over the Middlewich Branch of the Shropshire Union Canal. It is in brick, and consists of a single skewed basket arch with curved abutments. It has brick parapets with square piers at the ends.	II
Bridge No. 168; 53.18766°N 2.44113°W		1829	The bridge carries Booth Lane (A533 road) over the Middlewich Branch of the Shropshire Union Canal (the eastern end of which constitutes the Wardle Canal) at its junction with the Trent and Mersey Canal. It is built in brick and stone, and consists of a deep segmental arch with rusticated stone voussoirs.	II
Wardle Lock; 53.18760°N 2.44195°W		1829	The lock is at the eastern end of the Middlewich Branch of the Shropshire Union Canal (the Wardle Canal). It has walls of brick and stone, and timber gates, the upper being single and the lower double.	II
Lock keeper's cottage 53.18752°N 2.44198°W		1829 (or later)	The cottage stands by the Wardle Canal, the eastern end of the Middlewich Branch, built in brick with a roof of clay tiles. The cottage is in two storeys, and has a two-bay front, the right bay forming a gabled cross-wing. There is a single-story extension to the left. The windows are ecasements.	II
8 Southway; 53.19180°N 2.44909°W		1830s (probable)	A house that was altered in about 1900, built in brick with a hipped slate roof. It is in two storeys, and has a two-bay front. The doorway is pedimented and has a fanlight, and to the left is a single-storey square bay window. The windows are sashes with wedge lintels.	II
Manor House; 53.18353°N 2.45282°W	—	1830s (probable)	The house is built in stone, it is in two storeys, and has a three-bay front. In the centre is a portico with four fluted Ionic columns, a frieze, and a cornice. This is flanked by two-storey bay windows with stone mullions. There is another bay window on the garden front, and on the left side is an oriel window with a pyramidal roof. There is Greek key decoration in various places on the house.	II
Big Lock and footbridge 53.19759°N 2.44822°W		Mid-19th century	The lock on the Trent and Mersey Canal is about 5 metres (16.4 ft) wide. It is built in blue brick with red sandstone plinths and copings. The upper pair of gates are in timber, the lower pair in steel. The footbridge is in iron with brick abutments.	II
Chapels, archway and spire, Middlewich Cemetery; 53.19523°N 2.45207°W		1859	The two mortuary chapels, linked by an archway that is surmounted by a spire were designed by Bellamy and Hardy. They are built in stone with slate roofs, and are in the style of the 13th century. The chapels have windows with Geometrical tracery, openwork coping on the gables, and piers rising to pinnacles. The vaulted archway is also pinnacled, and from its centre rises a tower with diagonal buttresses, which is surmounted by a broach spire.	II
Gates and railings, Middlewich Cemetery; 53.19424°N 2.45260°W		c. 1859	The gates and railings are in cast iron on a stone plinth and were made by Button of Crewe. The central gateway is recessed and contains a pair of carriage gates. These are linked by canted screens to a pair of pedestrian gates, which are flanked by railings. There are openwork piers with finials. The railings are decorated with motifs including fleur-de-lys, arrows, and quatrefoils.	II
Cooke family tomb, Middlewich Cemetery; 53.19452°N 2.45240°W		1869	A stone monument consisting of a square base with inscribed panels, surmounted by a spire. The monument was paid for by public subscription, and commemorates seven members of a family killed in a house fire.	II
Guidepost; 53.18262°N 2.41446°W	—	Late 19th century	The guidepost is in cast iron, and consists of an octagonal post carrying an inscribed shield and topped by a ball finial. There are three plates indicating the directions of Middlewich and Kinderton, Sproston, and Bradwall.	II
Brunner Mond Middlewich War Memorial; 53.18877°N 2.43935°W		1921	The war memorial is in a roadside enclosure, it was designed by Darcy Braddell, and is in Portland stone. It has a rectangular two-stepped base, and consists of a tapering obelisk 8 feet (2.4 m) high with a cornice near the top. In the top section is a wreath in bronze, and on the front of the obelisk are inscriptions and the names of those lost in the two World Wars.	II
10 Hightown; 53.19252°N 2.44557°W		1928	Originating as a butcher's shop, it is built in brick with a façade of glazed white, cream and brown tiles, and it has a Welsh slate roof. The shop is in a single storey, and has a decorative parapet. At the sides are panels with ram's heads, and between is a segmental pediment with a tympanum containing a bull's head in a roundel, flanked by spandrels with floral motifs.	II

== See also ==
- Listed buildings in Bradwall
- Listed buildings in Byley
- Listed buildings in Moston
- Listed buildings in Sproston
- Listed buildings in Stanthorne
- Listed buildings in Wimboldsley
