= Occlestone Green =

Coordinates: 53.15°N 02.46°W

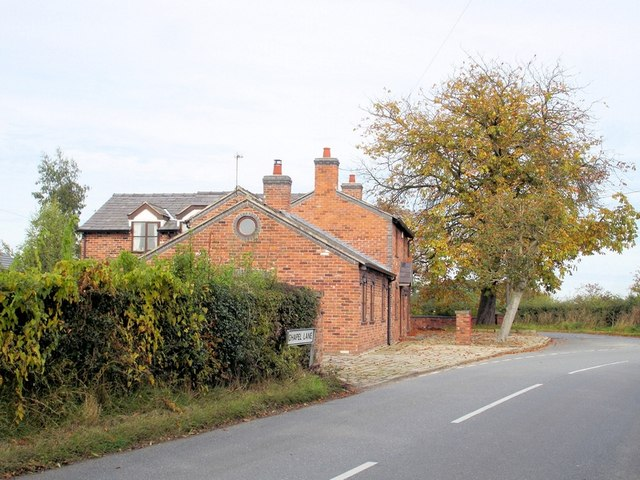
- Smithy Farm, Occlestone Green

- Location within Cheshire
- OS grid reference: SJ6962
- Unitary authority: Cheshire West and Chester
- Ceremonial county: Cheshire
- Region: North West
- Country: England
- Sovereign state: United Kingdom
- Police: Cheshire
- Fire: Cheshire
- Ambulance: North West

Occlestone Green is a small rural settlement in the civil parish of Stanthorne and Wimboldsley, the unitary authority of Cheshire West and Chester and the ceremonial county of Cheshire, England. Nearby settlements include the villages of Wimboldsley, Warmingham and Walley's Green. The nearest town is Middlewich.

== History ==
The settlement was formerly part of the township of Occlestone (or Occleston), which became a civil parish in 1862 and was incorporated into Wimboldsley in 1892. Occlestone also included the small settlement of Lea Head, with a total historical population of 85 (1801), 117 (1851) and 68 (1901). Wimboldsley amalgamated with Stanthorne in April 2015.

John Marius Wilson's Imperial Gazetteer of England and Wales (1870–72) described Occlestone:

OCCLESTONE, a township, with a scattered village, in Middlewich parish, Cheshire; on the river Wheelock, near the Middlewich canal and the Grand Junction railway, 1¾ mile S S W of Middlewich. Acres, 721. Real property, £1, 231. Pop., 110. Houses, 18. The manor belonged, from before the time of King John till after the time of Henry V., to the family of Occlestone; passed to successively the Bunburys, the Moretons, the Davenports, the Whitmores, and the Vernons; and belongs now to E. Vernon, Esq. The manor-house is a neat brick edifice, and is now used as a farm-house.

A Primitive Methodist chapel was built in Occlestone Green in 1871; in 1960 it was described as a brick building seating 60. It became redundant in 1961.

The route of the Roman road from Middlewich to near Nantwich runs north east to south west immediately to the west of the settlement.

== Geography ==
Occlestone Green is centred at SJ69506292, around the T-junction of School Lane/Chapel Lane with Forge Mill Lane (which runs south east to the neighbouring parish of Warmingham), with an elevation of 53 metres. The A530 Nantwich Road runs north–south around 0.5 km to the west of the junction. Hoggins Brook – a tributary of the River Wheelock – runs immediately south of the settlement, which is lined by a small area of woodland south of Forge Mill Lane (in Warmingham civil parish). Smithy Farm is on the junction and there are several nearby farms including Fields Farm, Manor Farm, New Farm and Occlestonegreen Farm.
