= Listed buildings in Warmingham =

Warmingham is a civil parish in Cheshire East, England. It contains eight buildings that are recorded in the National Heritage List for England as designated listed buildings. Of these, two are listed at Grade II*, the middle of the three grades, and the others are at Grade II. Apart from the village of Warmingham, the parish is rural. The listed buildings consist of houses, a church, a medieval cross base, a bridge, and a telephone kiosk.

== Key ==
Grade	Criteria
II*	Particularly important buildings of more than special interest
II	Buildings of national importance and special interest

== Buildings ==
Name and location	Photograph	Date	Notes	Grade
Cross base 53.14583°N 2.43650°W		c. 1298	The base of a medieval cross stands in the churchyard of St Leonard's Church. It is in sandstone, and consists of three steps and a base block. Standing on this is a limestone Tuscan column that had the fittings for a sundial, later removed. The base is also a scheduled monument.	II
Church House; 53.14533°N 2.43688°W		Late 16th century	In the 19th century a south wing was added at right angles, giving the house a T-shaped plan. The east front of the north wing is in close studded timber framing, and the rest of the house is in brick; the house has a slate roof. The north wing is in two storeys with a jettied upper storey and casement windows. The north wing is in 2½ storeys and a cellar, and has a front of four bays. On the front is a porch with bargeboards, and the windows are mullioned and transomed.	II*
Mill Lodge; 53.15773°N 2.44270°W	—	Early 17th century	Originally a farm building, later converted into a dwelling, with alterations in the 20th century. It is timber-framed with brick nogging, and has a weatherboarded gable and a tiled roof. The building is in a single storey with an attic at the north end. There is brickwork on the rear.	II
Old Hough Farmhouse; 53.15769°N 2.45055°W	—	Early 17th century	The farmhouse, which was altered in the 19th century, is built in brick with a slate roof. The house has an H-shaped plan, is in two storeys, and has a front of four bays. On the front is a gabled porch with timber-framing in the gable. The windows are casements, and the gables have bargeboards and finials.	II
St Leonard's Church; 53.14599°N 2.43672°W		1715	The oldest part of the church is the brick tower. The rest of the church, which had been timber-framed, was replaced in sandstone with a tiled roof in 1870 by R. C. Hussey in Perpendicular style. The church has a cruciform plan, consisting of a nave, short transepts, a chancel, a north porch, and a west tower. The tower has a crenellated parapet with crocketted pinnacles.	II*
Warmingham Bridge; 53.14630°N 2.43698°W		c. 1750	The bridge carries Warmingham Road over the River Wheelock. It is in sandstone and consists of a single rusticated arch. The bridge has a parapet of solid slabs, with curved ends terminating in square piers.	II
Warmingham Grange; 53.15029°N 2.43876°W	—	Early 19th century	Originally a rectory, later converted into use as a club, it is in rendered brick on a stone plinth, and has a slate roof. The building has a double pile plan, is in 2½ storeys, and has a front of five bays. On the front is a Doric portico with a plain entablature and a flat roof. The windows are sashes, those in the ground floor having arched heads, and in the upper floor with flat heads.	II
Telephone kiosk 53.14580°N 2.43690°W		1935	A K6 type telephone kiosk, designed by Giles Gilbert Scott. Constructed in cast iron with a square plan and a dome, it has three unperforated crowns in the top panels.	II

== See also ==
- Listed buildings in Stanthorne
- Listed buildings in Wimboldsley
- Listed buildings in Moston
- Listed buildings in Crewe
- Listed buildings in Minshull Vernon
