= Listed buildings in Moston, Cheshire East =

Moston is a civil parish in Cheshire East, England. It contains 16 buildings that are recorded in the National Heritage List for England as designated listed buildings, all of which are at Grade II. This grade is the lowest of the three gradings given to listed buildings and is applied to "buildings of national importance and special interest". The parish contains the village of Moston Green, but is otherwise mainly rural. The Trent and Mersey Canal runs through the parish, and eight of the listed buildings are associated with it, namely bridges, locks, and mileposts. The other listed buildings are farmhouses, farm buildings, a cottage, a club that was originally a farmhouse, and a turnpike milepost.

Name and location	Photograph	Date	Notes
Murgatroyd club 53.16171°N 2.40155°W	—	Late 16th century (probable)	This originated as Yew Tree Farmhouse, and has been later used as a club house. It was extended and altered in the 19th century. The building is timber-framed with plaster panels, and has been partly rebuilt in brick. It has a steep tiled roof, and is in two storeys, the upper storey being slightly jettied. The windows are casements. There is a brick rear wing.
Crabmill Old Farmhouse; 53.14064°N 2.41901°W		Early 17th century (probable)	The farmhouse is partly timber-framed and partly in brick, and has clay tiled roofs. It was extended in the 18th century, and altered in the 20th century. The windows are casements. Inside the house are oak beams and visible timber-framing.
The Willows; 53.15140°N 2.41148°W	—	Early 17th century	A timber-framed cottage on a plinth of brick and stone, and partly rebuilt in brick. It is in 1½ storeys, and has a cement tile roof. The windows are casements. Inside the cottage is an inglenook with a bressumer.
Barn, stables and shippon, Moston Manor Farm; 53.15222°N 2.41348°W	—	c. 1690	Farm buildings that were extended in the middle of the 18th century and have been little altered since. They are built in brick, have tiled roofs, and form a U-shaped plan. Their features include various openings, casement windows, and ventilation holes in differing patterns.
Ivy Cottage; 53.15527°N 2.41506°W	—	Late 18th century	A brick farmhouse with a slate roof. It is in two storeys, and has a symmetrical two-bay front. The house has a lean-to porch, casement windows and gables with bargeboards.
Shippon and stable, Ivy Cottage; 53.15541°N 2.41509°W	—	Late 18th century	The farm buildings are in brick with cement tile roofs. It contains doorways, hopper windows, pitch holes, and ventilation holes.
Bridge No. 162; 53.15767°N 2.40391°W		1777	The bridge carries Dragon's Lane across the Trent and Mersey Canal, for which the engineer was James Brindley. It is built in brick and consists of a single deep segmental arch. The bridge has curved abutments, square end piers, and stone copings.
Bridge No. 164; 53.16788°N 2.41207°W		1777 (probable)	An accommodation bridge over the Trent and Mersey Canal, for which the engineer was James Brindley. It is built in brick and has flush voussoirs and keystones. On the east side is a curved ramp with brick wall, and on the west side the parapet ends in square piers.
Lock No. 67; 53.15566°N 2.40453°W		1777	A lock on the Trent and Mersey Canal, for which the engineer was James Brindley. The walls are in brick and stone. The upper gate is single, the lower double; both are timber. There is a curved flight of stone steps and a replaced footbridge.
Lock No. 68 and attached bridge 53.16197°N 2.40414°W		1777	A lock on the Trent and Mersey Canal, for which the engineer was James Brindley. The walls are in brick and stone. The upper gate is single and in steel, the lower gate is double and timber. Attached is a brick accommodation bridge consisting of a single deep segmental arch. with curved abutments and square end piers.
Lock No. 69; 53.16386°N 2.40650°W		1777	A lock on the Trent and Mersey Canal, for which the engineer was James Brindley. The walls are in brick and stone. The upper gate is single, the lower double; both are steel. At the lower end are curved abutments. There is a flight of stone steps on each side and a replaced footbridge.
Canal milestone 53.15482°N 2.40458°W	—	1819	The canal milestone is in cast iron and consists of a circular post with a moulded top. It carries two convex panels with the distances in miles to Preston Brook and to Shardlow in embossed letters. On the shaft are the initials of the manufacturer and the date.
Canal milestone 53.14149°N 2.40140°W	—	1819	The canal milepost is in cast iron and consists of a tapering circular post with a domed top. It carries two curved plates inscribed with the distances in miles to Preston Brook and to Shardlow. On the shaft are the initials of the manufacturer and the date.
Canal milepost 53.16775°N 2.41199°W	—	1819	The canal milepost is in cast iron and consists of a circular post with a moulded top. It carries two convex panels with the distances in miles to Preston Brook and to Shardlow in embossed letters. On the shaft are the initials of the manufacturer and the date.
Milepost; 53.17075°N 2.41665°W	—	Early 19th century	A turnpike milepost in cast iron. It consists of a circular stem bearing the details of the manufacturer, and curved plates giving the distances in miles to Middlewich, Davenham, Northwich, Sandbach, Church Lawton, and Newcastle.
Moston Manor Farmhouse; 53.15232°N 2.41407°W	—	1830s (probable)	The farmhouse probably contains some earlier features. It is built in brick and has cement tile roofs. The house is in three storeys, and has a symmetrical three-bay front. The door way has simple Classical features, and the windows are sashes. The gables have bargeboards.

== See also ==
- Listed buildings in Bradwall
- Listed buildings in Crewe
- Listed buildings in Haslington
- Listed buildings in Middlewich
- Listed buildings in Sandbach
- Listed buildings in Stanthorne
- Listed buildings in Warmingham
- Listed buildings in Wimboldsley
