= Warmingham =

Village in Cheshire, England

Coordinates: 53.150°N 2.433°W

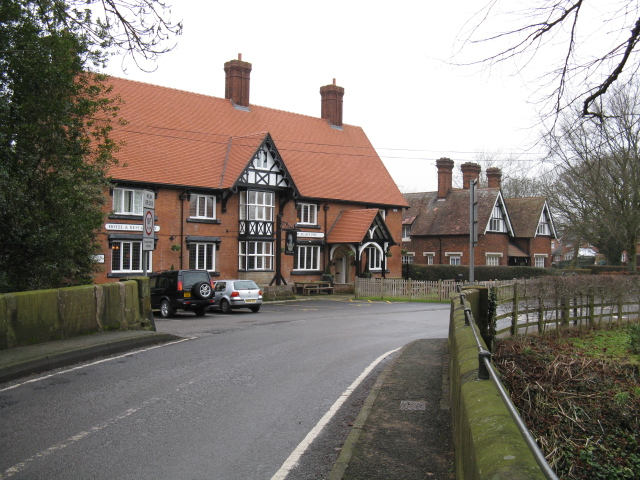
- Warmingham village centre and the Bear's Paw pub

- Location within Cheshire
- Population: 244 (2011)
- OS grid reference: SJ708611
- Civil parish: Warmingham
- Unitary authority: Cheshire East
- Ceremonial county: Cheshire
- Region: North West
- Country: England
- Sovereign state: United Kingdom
- Post town: SANDBACH
- Postcode district: CW11
- Dialling code: 01270
- Police: Cheshire
- Fire: Cheshire
- Ambulance: North West
- UK Parliament: Congleton

Warmingham is a village and civil parish in the unitary authority of Cheshire East and ceremonial county of Cheshire, England, on the River Wheelock (at SJ708611), 3.25 miles (5.23 km) north of Crewe, 3.25 miles (5.23 km) south of Middlewich and 3.25 miles (5.23 km) miles west of Sandbach. The parish also includes the small settlement of Lane Ends, with a total population of just under 250. Nearby villages include Minshull Vernon, Moston and Wimboldsley.

The land is mentioned in the Domesday Book of 1086, with a village being documented from the 13th century. The oldest surviving building dates from the late 16th century. In the 17th and 18th centuries the parish had a finery forge, which was among the earliest in the county. The area is agricultural, with dairy farming the predominant land use. The Northwich Halite Formation, a Triassic salt field, underlies the parish, and there is a long history of local salt production, with the Warmingham brine field remaining an important source of the mineral. Cavities in the salt-bearing stratum are used to store natural gas. Several flashes were created in the 20th century by subsidence after natural brine pumping in the area, some of which form part of a Site of Special Scientific Interest. The village maintains the tradition of holding a wake each May.

== History ==
An Iron Age gold stater (coin) dating from around the end of the 1st century BC was found in the parish. One face depicts a horse, with a wreath on the obverse. An urn described as Roman, but possibly as early as the Bronze Age, was discovered in a burial mound near Forge Mill. There is no other evidence of Roman inhabitation at Warmingham, although the remains of a Roman road from Middlewich to near Nantwich pass around 200 metres away from the parish's north-west corner.

Warmingham is documented under Tetton in the Domesday Book of 1086. The medieval manor was granted to Randulphus. There is believed to have been a medieval church in the village, although only a cross base remains. The earliest recorded rector was in 1298. The land passed to the Mainwaring and Trussell families, and in the 16th century part was sold to Christopher Hatton. It then passed to Randolph Crewe, and remained in the Crewe family until 1918. The village school was founded in 1839.

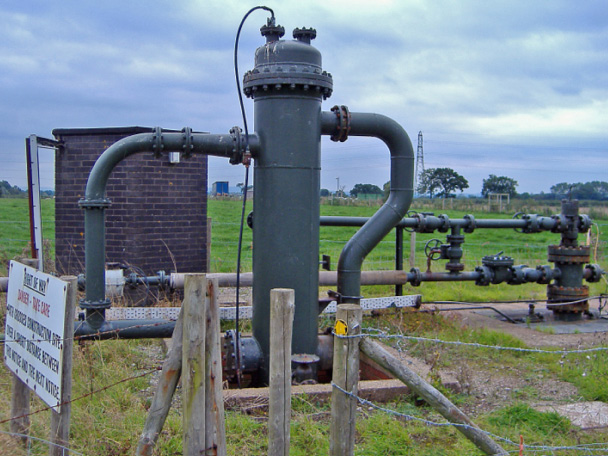
Brine pump near Hill Top Farm

A prisoner-of-war camp was located at Donkinson's Oak, near the southern edge of the parish, during the Second World War, and there was a heavy anti-aircraft battery near Bottoms Farm in 1940–41. The village gained an electricity supply in the 1950s. The village post office and shop closed in the 1970s.

=== Salt and other industries ===
The Warmingham area has a long history of salt extraction. Brine from the parish's flashes is thought to have been used to make salt in Middlewich, an important salt-producing centre during the Roman occupation. Natural (uncontrolled) brine pumping at nearby Elworth, Ettiley Heath, Wheelock and elsewhere in the Sandbach area occurred from the 19th century, increasing sharply after the First World War, and was associated with subsidence in Warmingham and the adjacent parish of Moston from the 1890s. The Sandbach Flashes – pools formed by subsidence from the underlying salt dissolving, accelerated by salt extraction – first appeared in the early 1920s and were still expanding in the 1950s. Natural brine pumping ceased in the area in the early 1970s, and British Salt started to extract brine by the controlled pumping method, which prevents subsidence, at a site near Hill Top Farm in the early 1980s.

The village had a corn mill from around 1289. A finery forge or smelting furnace was established on the River Wheelock north of the village in the mid-17th century, one of a handful in Cheshire at that date. It was still in operation in around 1750, when its annual output of bar iron was recorded as 300 tons, more than any other Cheshire forge. The former corn mill was adapted to grind coconut shells for manufacturing plastics, and aircraft parts were made there during the Second World War. By 1990, the building had been converted into craft workshops, and it had been demolished by 2006.

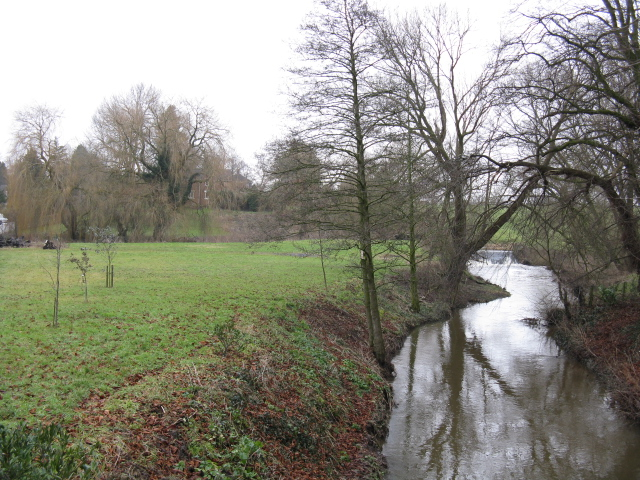
River Wheelock

== Governance ==
Warmingham is administered by Warmingham Parish Council. From 1974, the civil parish was served by Crewe and Nantwich Borough Council, which was succeeded on 1 April 2009 by the unitary authority of Cheshire East. Warmingham falls in the parliamentary constituency of Congleton, which has been represented since the 2024 general election by Sarah Russell of the Labour Party. It was previously part of the Eddisbury constituency, which since its establishment in 1983 had been held by the Conservative Party MPs Alastair Goodlad (1983–99), Stephen O'Brien (1999–2015), Antoinette Sandbach (2015–19) and Edward Timpson (2019–24).

== Geology and geography ==
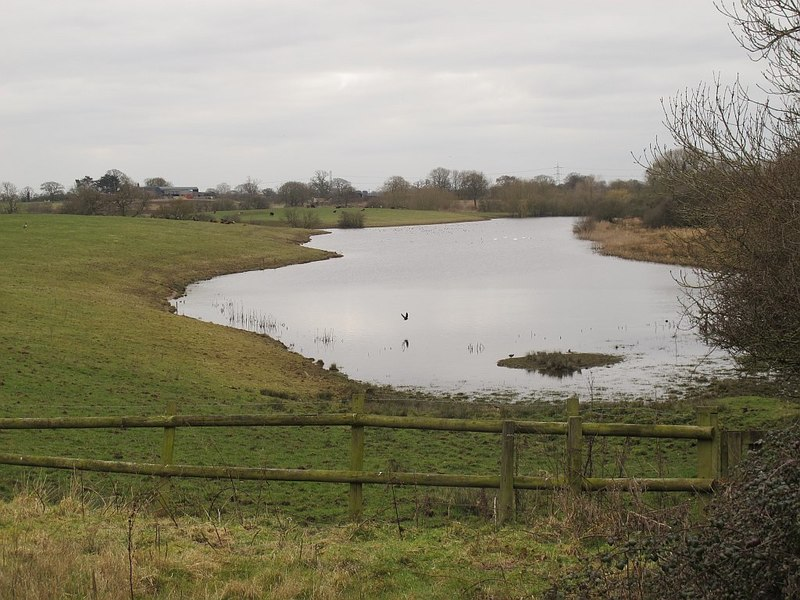
Crabmill Flash

The Northwich Halite Formation, a Triassic salt field, underlies the civil parish, with the 170–240-metre-thick salt-bearing layer lying around 180–250 metres below the surface. In the area of Hill Top and Hole House, sandy soil overlays red clay, with the base rock being Triassic sandstone–mudstone.

The River Wheelock runs broadly north-west to south-east through the civil parish, with much of the parish lying in its valley. The ground is undulating with an average elevation of around 45 metres. Hoggins Brook, a tributary of the Wheelock, forms parts of the northern and western boundaries of the parish, and Fowle Brook runs north–south in the south-east corner. Crabmill Flash lies immediately north of the Wheelock at SJ71756050; part of Elton Flashes lies in the east of the parish, and Bottoms Flash and part of Railway Flash lie in the south-east of the parish. These wetlands form part of the Sandbach Flashes, a Site of Special Scientific Interest and a popular site for birdwatching. Numerous meres and ponds are scattered throughout the area, and there are several small areas of woodland in the north west of the parish, near The Old Hough. Warmingham Moss occupies the south-west of the parish.

== Economics ==
The parish is predominantly agricultural, with dairy farming remaining the main land use. Brine is extracted using controlled brine pumping by British Salt from the Warmingham brine field, located near Hill Top Farm to the west of Warmingham village, and is processed to make white salt at its Middlewich salt works. Warmingham is one of two major brine fields still being exploited in Britain (the other being the Holford brine field at Lostock Gralam, also in Cheshire). It supplies all of British Salt's brine, which is used to manufacture around half of the UK's pure salt output. Since 2003, EDF has stored natural gas in underground cavities created by dissolving salt near Hole House Farm, with a total storage capacity of 75 million m^{3}. A second gas storage site has been constructed near Hill Top Farm, and is scheduled to start operating by the end of 2016.

== Demography ==
According to the 2001 Census, the parish had a population of 175, increasing to 244 in 92 households at the 2011 Census. This represents a decline from the population of 1851; historical population figures are 346 (1801), 423 (1851), 218 (1901) and 199 (1951). The population density was 0.3 persons/hectare in 2011, well below the average of 3.2 persons/hectare for Cheshire East.

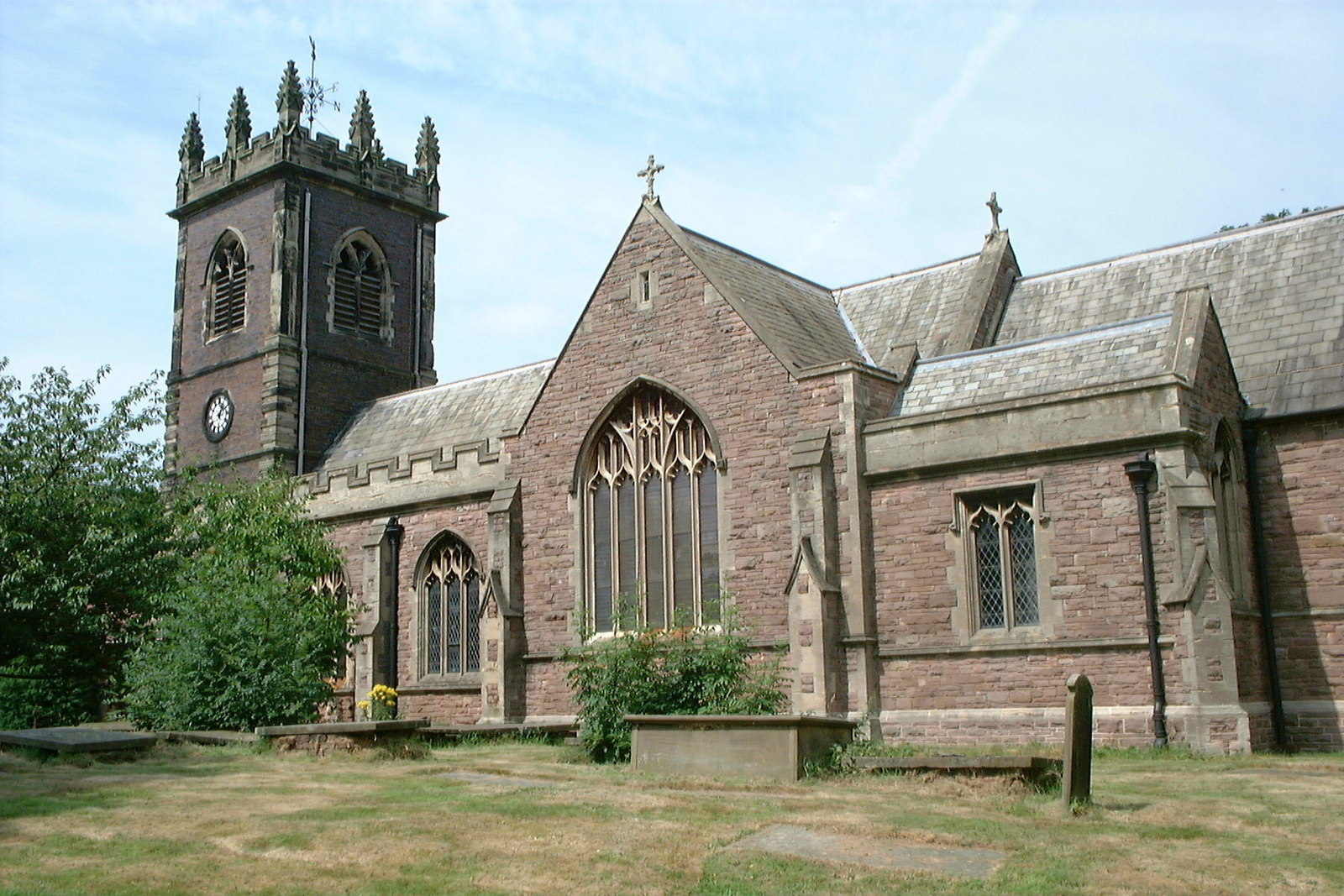
St Leonard's Church

== Places of worship ==
The Church of England parish church of St Leonard's is in the centre of Warmingham village. The purple-brick church tower dates from 1715, and the body of the church was rebuilt in red sandstone in 1870, replacing an earlier timber-framed building; it is listed at grade II*. The base of a medieval stone cross, dating from around 1298, survives in the churchyard; it is listed at the lower grade of II, and is also a scheduled monument.

== Other landmarks ==
Warmingham village was historically centred around Warmingham Bridge across the Wheelock, which falls within a conservation area that also includes St Leonard's Church, Church House, Hill Top Cottage, Mill House, Island House and the Bear's Paw Hotel, extending to cover earthworks east of the village centre. There are two separate sets of earthworks: one is at the site of the 13th-century watermill, and represents the dam, leat and mill pond; the other is a partially moated site associated with Sir John Trussel's manor house.

The oldest surviving building in the civil parish, Church House, dates from the late 16th century and is listed at grade II*. It is partly red brick and partly half-timbered, with a typical Elizabethan façade combining close studding with decorative framing in a chevron pattern. One former resident was John "Rebel" Kent, a supporter of Charles Edward Stuart ("Bonnie Prince Charlie") in the Jacobite uprising of 1745. The red-sandstone Warmingham Bridge dates from around 1750 and is listed at grade II. The 19th-century Bear's Paw is the only remaining public house in the parish.

Outside the village, there are two grade-II-listed, early-17th-century farm buildings, Old Hough Farm House and Mill Lodge, which each combine brick with timber framing. Both are off Forge Mill Lane in the north of the parish. Warmington Grange, off School Lane, is a grade-II-listed former rectory dating from the early 19th century, which served as a club and restaurant from the 1970s until 2005.

== Culture and community ==
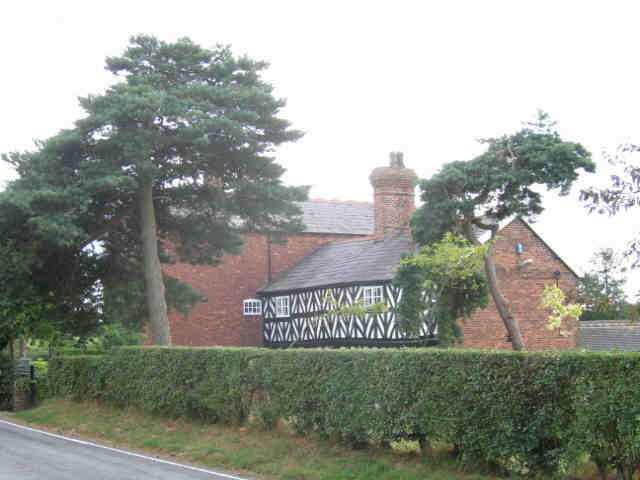
Church House

The village maintains the tradition of holding Warmingham Wakes in early May; the event is now used to raise money for St Leonard's Church. The village has an active Women's Institute, founded in 1948. The village hall on School Lane, originally an army hut, was renovated in the 1970s; plans to build a new hall were ongoing in 2016.

== Transport ==
Warmingham Road runs north–south through the parish, connecting Coppenhall Moss (in Crewe) and Lane Ends with Warmingham village, where it crosses the Wheelock and becomes School Lane. Hall Lane runs east from Warmingham Road to the parish of Moston. White Hall Lane runs north from School Lane, connecting with Forge Mill Lane which runs west to Occlestone Green, and Crabmill Lane runs south from School Lane to connect with Hall Lane in Moston. The West Coast Main Line railway runs north–south for a few hundred metres in the south-west corner of the parish, between the Crewe and Winsford stations, and is crossed by a footbridge. The Crewe and Nantwich Circular Walk runs east–west through the south of the parish. The Cycling the Salt Ride cycle route runs along part of the eastern boundary, via Crabmill Lane.

== Education ==
Warmingham Church of England Primary School is on School Lane in Warmingham village; it also accepts pupils from part of Minshull Vernon. For secondary education, the civil parish falls within the catchment area of Sir William Stanier School in Crewe.

== See also ==
- Listed buildings in Warmingham
- History of salt in Middlewich
