= History of Sandbach =

Sandbach was on the Roman road from Middlewich to Chesterton.

== Toponymy ==
Known as Sanbec in 1086, and Sondbache in 1260, Sandbach derives its name from the Anglo-Saxon sand bæce, which can mean sand stream or sand valley.

== Early history ==
Traces of Settlement are found in Sandbach from Saxon times the town was then called Sanbec, during this time little is known about the town apart from the fact that there were Welsh and Danish raids frequently. The town's inhabitants were converted to Christianity in the 7th Century by four Priests, Cedda, Adda, Betti and Diuma. The town has a reading in the Domesday Book from 1086 at that time the town was of a sufficient size to call for a priest and a church. The reading states

Sanbec: Bigot de Loges. 1 hide and 1½ virgates pay tax. Land for 2 ploughs. 1 Frenchman has ½ plough, 3 slaves. 2 villagers have ½ plough. Church. Woodland. Value TRE 4s; now 8s.

By the 13th Century much of the land around the townstead of Sandbach was owned by the 1230 High Sheriff of Cheshire, Richard de Sandbach.

== Tudor and Stuart era ==
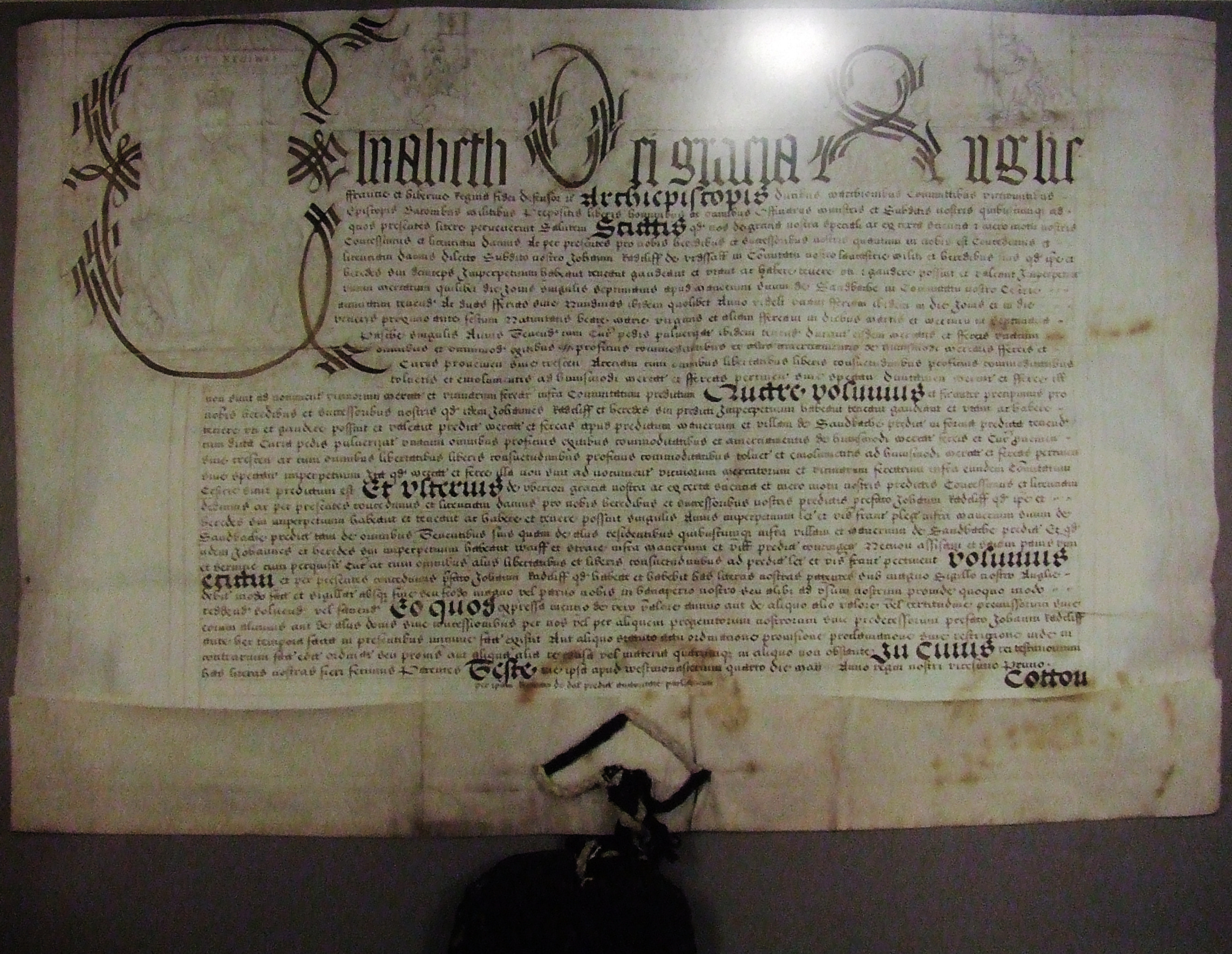
Reproduction of Royal Charter awarded by Queen Elizabeth in 1579 to Sir John Radcliffe of Ordsall for a market to be held in Sandbach, on display in the Town Council.

Sandbach has been a market town since 1579 when it was granted a Royal Charter by Elizabeth I due to the petitioning of Sir John Radclyffe of Ordsall who as the largest landowner in Sandbach and the owner of the Old Hall encouraged the farmers of the area to go and hold a market in the town on Thursdays. The actual Charter is still preserved and can be found in Chester, a reproduction can be found in the Sandbach Town Council meeting offices, which are at the Literary Institution. The charter also granted the town the right to hold two annual fairs, which lasted for two days, and were held around Easter and early September. Today the Thursday market is still held outdoors on Scotch Common, and in and around Sandbach Town Hall. Nearby are some wetlands called Sandbach Flashes.

== Civil war and Commonwealth ==
During the Wars of the Three Kingdoms a Scottish army swept down into England, at the Battle of Worcester it was forced to retreat. This was the only notable event of the Civil War to have happened in Sandbach. On 3 September 1651 Sandbach summer fair was being held and a Scottish army of around 1000 exhausted cavalry men passed through the town; this army had been under the command of David Leslie. The town was not an easy retreat route however; the people of Sandbach and the market stall holders attacked the Scottish in their tents during the night whilst they slept, killing 9 or 10 and taking around one hundred prisoner. A newspaper of the time said:

The dispute was very hot for two or three houres, and there were some townsmen hurt and two or three slaine, the Townesman slew about nine or ten and tooke 100 prisoners.

As the Fair and the fight took place on the common of the town, after this event the Common gained the name Scotch Common.

== World War Two ==
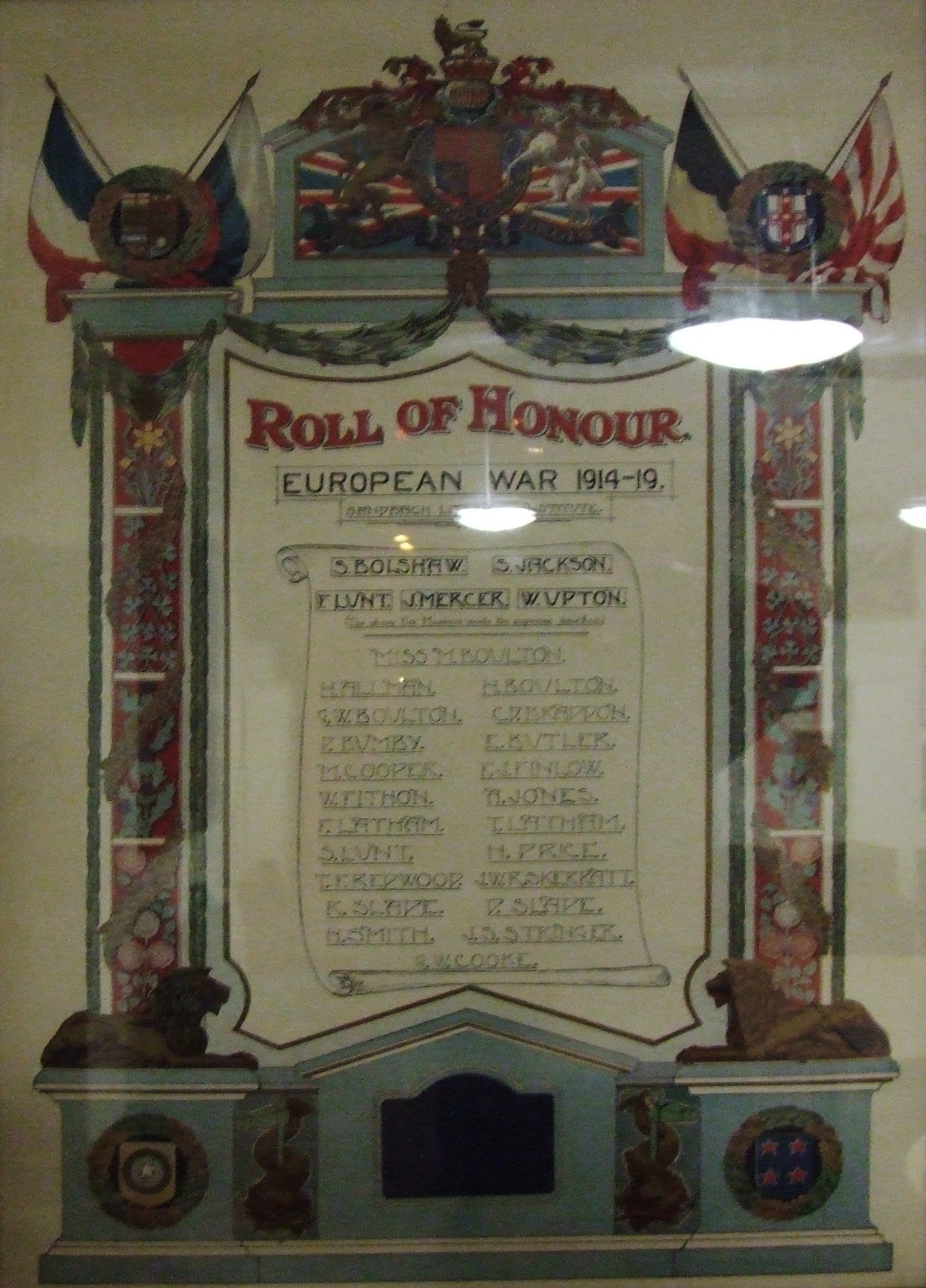
Sandbach Roll of Honour, European War (1914-1919), on display at the Town Council in the Literary Institution.

In December 1941, HMS Vimiera was adopted by the civil community of Sandbach, Cheshire, following the successful Warship Week National Saving campaign. Following the entrance of the United States of America to the Second World War, GIs were billeted in the area around their Headquarters in the Wheatsheaf Public house, located in the town centre.
