= Listed buildings in Bradwall =

Bradwall is a civil parish in Cheshire East, England. It contains three buildings that are recorded in the National Heritage List for England as designated listed buildings, all of which are at Grade II. This grade is the lowest of the three gradings given to listed buildings and is applied to "buildings of national importance and special interest". The parish is entirely rural. The listed buildings consist of a farmhouse, buildings associated with a former hall, and a former reformatory school and farm.

Name and location	Photograph	Date	Notes
Hall Cottage and coach house 53.16524°N 2.37395°W	—	17th century (probable)	These buildings are associated with the former Bradwall Hall. They were probably initially timber-framed and are now in brick with tiled roofs. The cottage is in two storeys and has casement windows. The coach house forms a cross-wing, has a timber-framed gable, and two coach openings.
Plumtree Farmhouse; 53.16973°N 2.36000°W	—	c. 1700 (probable)	The farmhouse has since been altered, and is built in brick with tiled roofs. It is in two storeys with attics, and has a symmetrical three-bay gabled front. The windows are casements. Inside the building are inglenooks.
School Cottages; 53.1719°N 2.3673°W	—	1855	This originated as reformatory school and a farm, and was later converted into cottages. The buildings surround a courtyard and are constructed in brick with tiled or slated roofs. They are in two storeys, and the front facing the road is symmetrical with three bays. The centre bay projects slightly forward under a gable and contains an arched entry that has been converted into a doorway. This is flanked by casement windows.

== See also ==
- Listed buildings in Middlewich
- Listed buildings in Moston
- Listed buildings in Sandbach
- Listed buildings in Brereton
- Listed buildings in Sproston
