= Middlewich Manor =

Manor house in Middlewich, Cheshire, England

Coordinates: 53.18353°N 2.45276°W

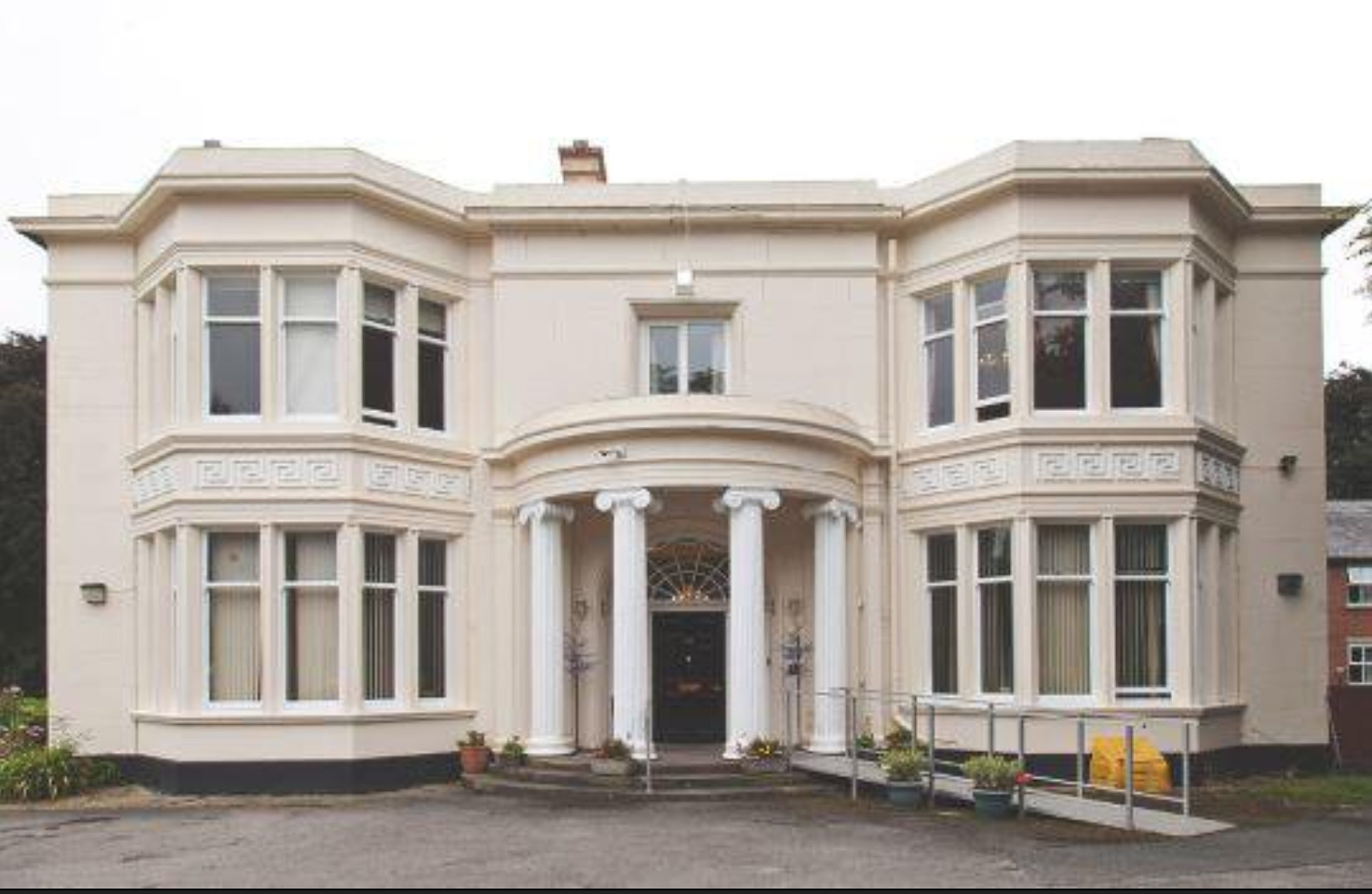
- Middlewhich Manor
- Interactive map of Middlewich Manor

General information
- Type: Manor house
- Location: Middlewich, Cheshire, England

Middlewich Manor (also called the Manor House, Middlewich) is a former manor house in Middlewich, Cheshire, England. It was originally constructed in brick in about 1800, and it was encased in ashlar in about 1840, when the porch was also built The bay windows were added in the 1870s. As of 2011, it is a residential care home. The house is constructed in yellow ashlar and is in two storeys. On its entrance front is a porch supported by four fluted Ionic columns. Along the top of the porch is a frieze and a cornice. On each side of the porch are two-storey canted bay windows. Between the stories is a band of Greek keys. A parapet runs along the top of the house, behind which is a low-pitched roof. On the garden front there are sash windows and a canted two-storey bay window to the right, and a wing with a stone oriel window and a pyramidal slated roof to the left. There is more decoration with bands of Greek keys on this front. The house is recorded in the National Heritage List for England as a designated Grade II listed building.

== Residents ==
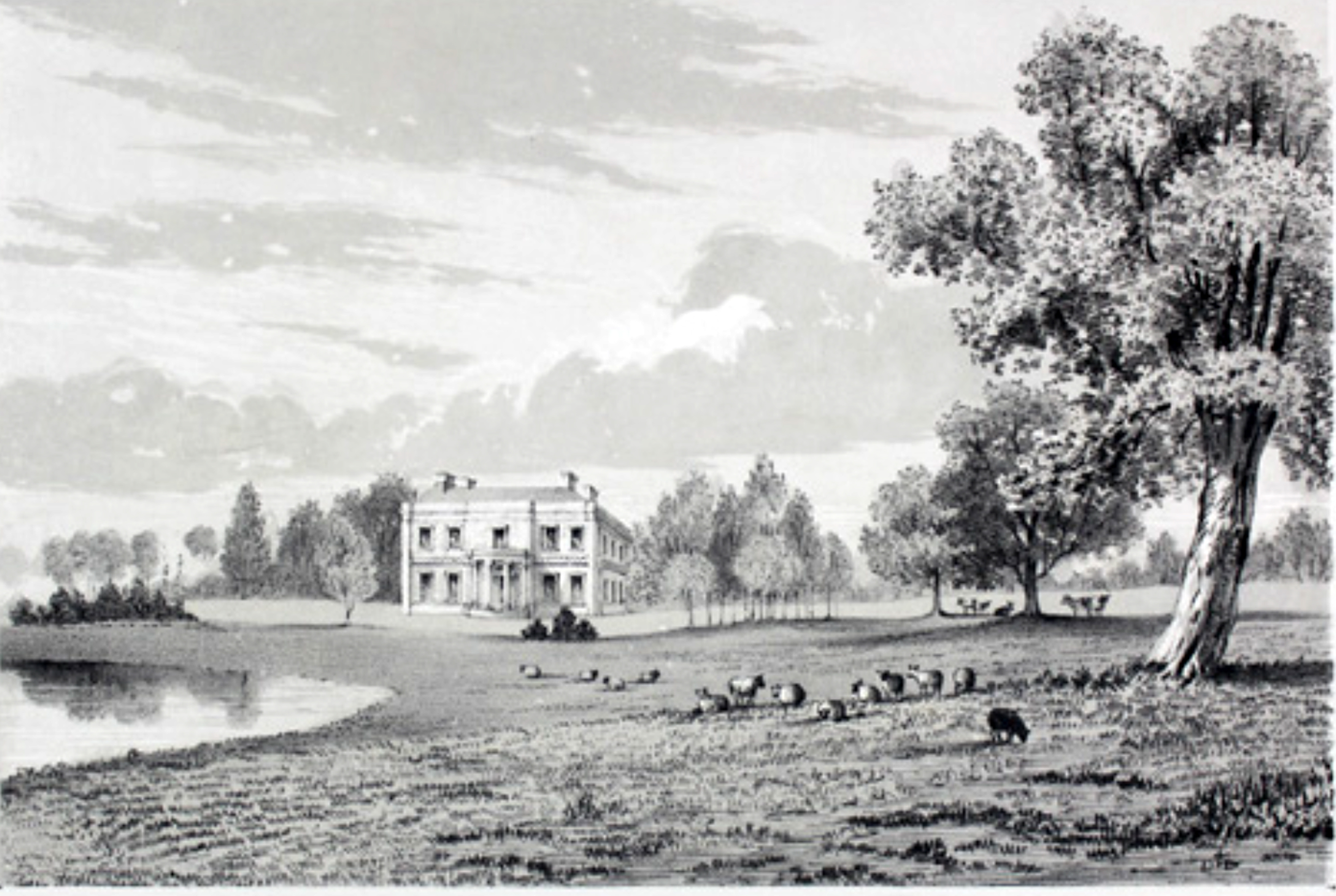
Etching of the Manor, Middlewich 1850

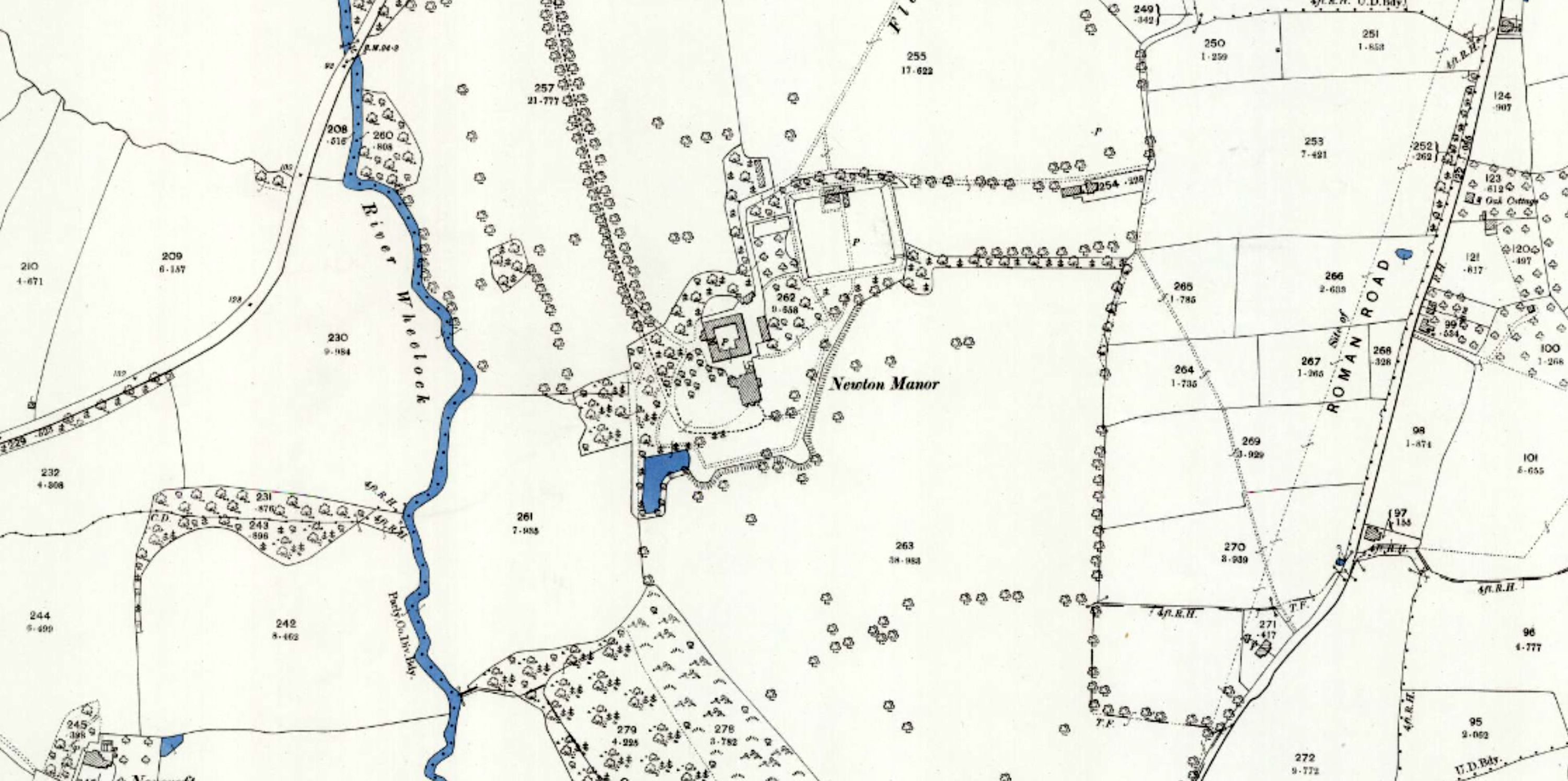
Map of the Manor Middlewich 1897

John Roylance (1745-1812) built The Manor in about 1800. During the nineteenth century the house was often called “Newton Manor” or Manor Hall. The historian Daniel Lysons said in 1810 that John Roylance had recently purchased the estate and built a mansion as his residence. He was a wealthy landowner who also owned properties in Stanthorne and Winsford.

In 1802 he married Elizabeth Billington but the couple had no children. When he died in 1812 he left his wife an annuity and her marriage settlement. His property was left to William Court who was the son of John’s cousin Ann Court.

William Court (1786-1856) became a wealthy landowner and salt proprietor after his inheritance. He made substantial additions to the Manor in about 1840 which are shown on the etching. In 1809 he married Elizabeth Wood (1783-1818) who was the daughter of John Wood of Longnor. The couple had four children. Elizabeth died in 1818 and William was a widower for the next 34 years. Then in 1852 he married Elizabeth Turner (1800-1882) who had independent means. When William died in 1856 his eldest son William Roylance Court (1812-1881) became the owner of the estates including the Manor.

William Roylance Court (1812-1881) married in 1846 Jane Skerratt (1822-1901), daughter of James Skerratt of Wheellock House, Sandbach. The couple had three sons and five daughters. When he died his eldest son William Roylance Court (1852-1917) inherited the estates.

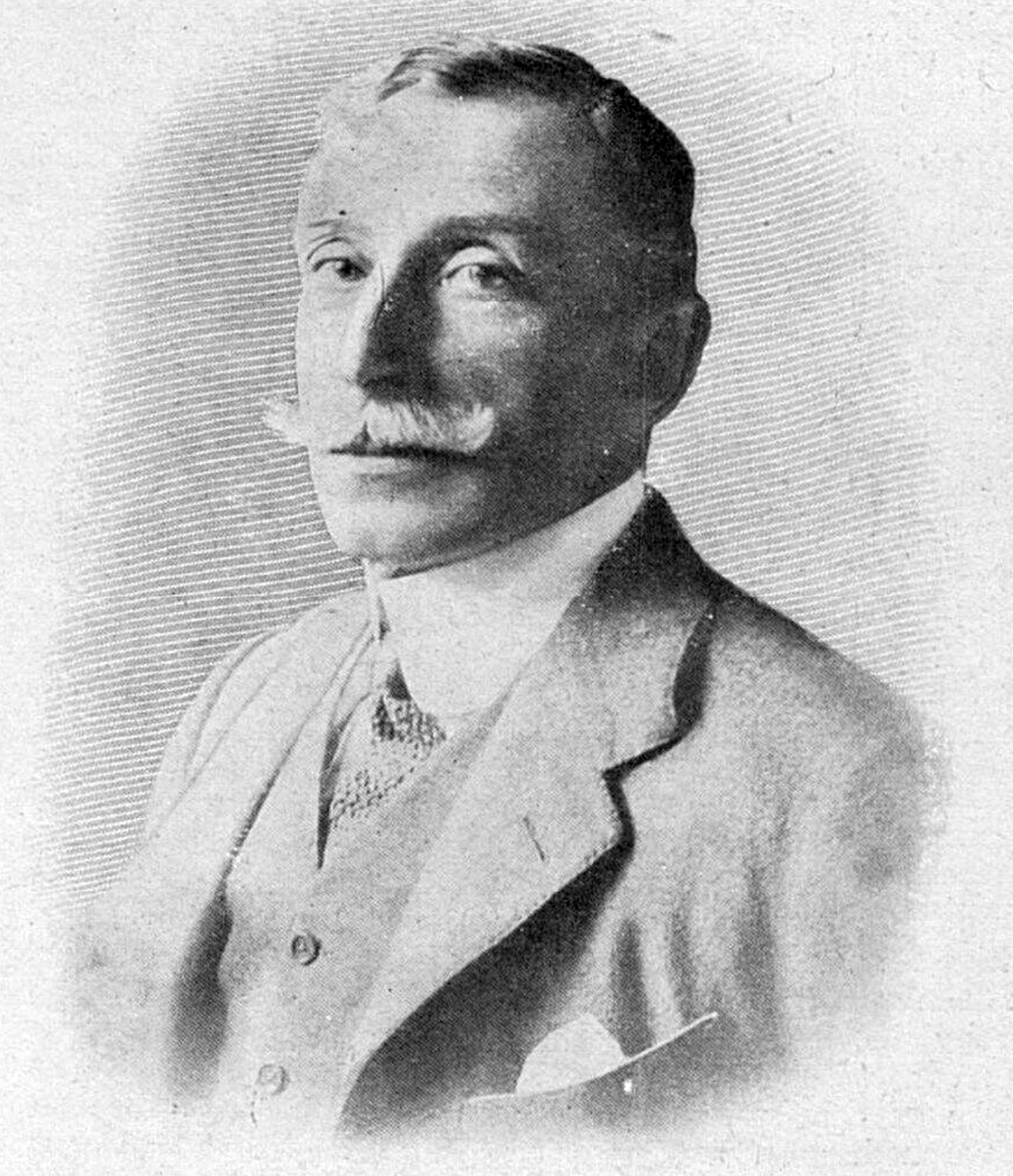
William Roylance Court (1852-1917)

William Roylance Court (1852-1917) was a barrister as well as a landed proprietor. In 1883 he married Mary Carlaw Walker (1859-1933), daughter of Sir Andrew Barclay Walker of Osmaston Manor, Derby. The couple had one son and two daughters. The 1891 census records the family living in the Manor with a governess, lady’s maid, butler, two footmen, a cook, two housemaids and a kitchen maid. William was a colourful figure. He played polo and was a member of the Cheshire Hunt. Their only son William Herbert Roylance Court (1885-1915) was a Captain in the 9th Lancers and was killed at Ypres in World War I. When William died in 1917 his wife Mary continued to live at the Manor. When she died in 1933 their eldest daughter Evelyn Roylance Rolt inherited the property.

Evelyn Roylance Rolt (1884-1941) had married Brigadier-General Stuart Peter Rolt in 1912 and the couple had six children. After Evelyn died in 1941 the house remained in the Rolt family for some time. From 1955 until 1984 it was in the occupation of the Willing-Denton family.

== See also ==
- Listed buildings in Middlewich
