= St Leonard's Church, Warmingham =

Coordinates: 53.1460°N 2.4365°W

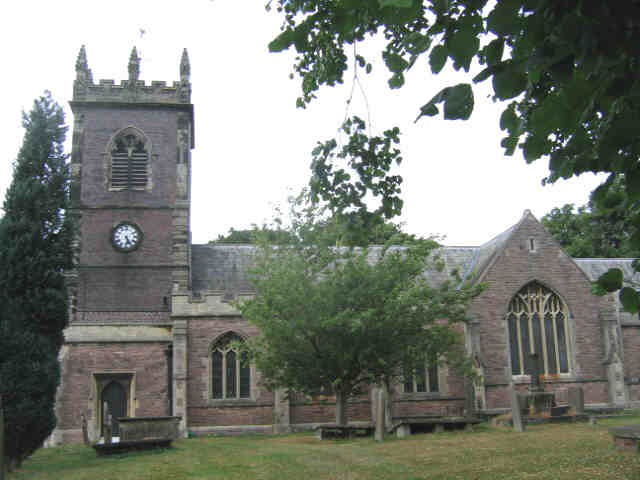
- St Leonard's Church, Warmingham, from the south

- Location in Cheshire
- OS grid reference: SJ 709 611
- Location: Warmingham, Cheshire
- Country: England
- Denomination: Anglican
- Website: Warmingham, St Leonard

History
- Dedication: St Leonard

Architecture
- Heritage designation: Grade II*
- Designated: 12 January 1967
- Architect: R. C. Hussey
- Architectural type: Church
- Style: Gothic Revival
- Completed: 1899

Specifications
- Materials: Red sandstone squared rubble with a slate roof Brick tower with stone dressings

Administration
- Province: York
- Diocese: Chester
- Archdeaconry: Macclesfield
- Deanery: Congleton
- Parish: Warmingham

Clergy
- Rector: Revd David James Page

St Leonard's Church is in the village of Warmingham, Cheshire, England. The church is recorded in the National Heritage List for England as a designated Grade II* listed building. It is an active Anglican parish church in the diocese of Chester, the archdeaconry of Macclesfield and the deanery of Congleton. Its benefice is combined with that of St Peter, Minshull Vernon.

== History ==
The tower dates from 1715. The rest of the church was timber framed, then rebuilt in stone in 1870 by R. C. Hussey. The original windows in the tower were replaced by windows in Gothic style in 1899.

== Architecture ==
=== Exterior ===
The tower is built in small bluish bricks, and the rest of the church is in red sandstone squared rubble with a slate roof. The tower is at the west end. The church is cruciform in shape with a four-bay nave and a less lofty one-bay chancel, very short transepts, and a north porch. The tower has a stone plinth, stone quoins, and stone bands which divide it into four stages. On the north and south sides are clock faces and on the west side is a bullseye window. Above these are two-light bell openings. At the top is a moulded cornice, and a crenellated parapet with crocketted pinnacles. Other than the tower, the church is in Perpendicular style.

=== Interior ===
The choirstalls have carved poppyheads. The font is in carved oak and dates from the 16th century. The stained glass windows in the south transept and the east window are by Maréchal and Champigneule of Metz and are dated 1870. Those in the north transept and the south aisle are by Heaton, Butler and Bayne and are dated 1878. The memorials include a Rococo monument to William Vernon who died in 1732. Other monuments are a rectangular brass plate to Rev William Lingards who died in 1620, a marble tablet with an oval panel to Rev Randulph Crewe who died in 1777, and a marble table to Ralph Vernon who died in 1798. Also in the church is a wooden benefaction board dated 1755.

== External features ==
In the churchyard is the base of a medieval cross dating from around 1298 or later. It is in red sandstone and consists of a two-step base on top of which is a bevelled block. This holds a short Tuscan column on the top of which are the fixings for a sundial. It is listed at Grade II, and is a scheduled monument.

== See also ==
- Grade II* listed buildings in Cheshire East
- Listed buildings in Warmingham
