= Lea Hall, Wimboldsley =

Coordinates: 53.17346°N 2.47968°W

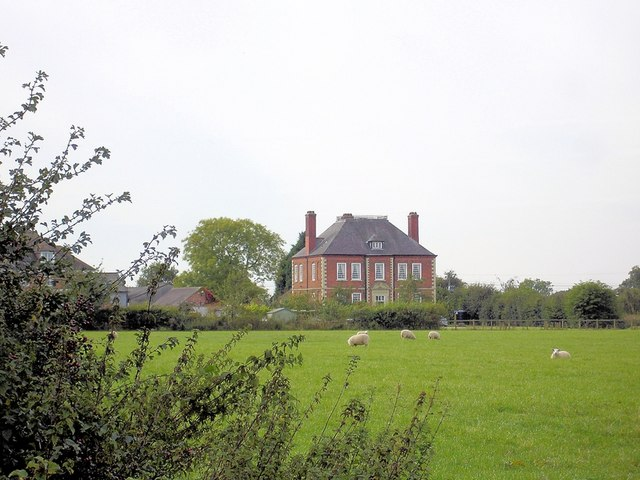
Lea Hall photographed in 2007

Lea Hall is a former country house standing to the northwest of the village of Wimboldsley, Cheshire, England. It dates from the early part of the 18th century, and was built for the Lowndes family. During the 19th century the house was owned by Joseph Verdin. Additions, including dormer windows, were made in the 19th century. During the 20th century the house was divided into three flats. The house is constructed in red brick with ashlar dressings and a tiled roof. It is in two storeys, with an attic and a basement. The roof is large and hipped, with a viewing platform. The entrance front is symmetrical, in five bays, the central bay protruding slightly forward. This bay contains a doorway with a swan's nest pediment decorated with scrolls, and containing a crest with the initials J V (for Joseph Verdin). The authors of the Buildings of England series describe the house as a "perfect brick box, delightful if just a little funny to look at". It is recorded in the National Heritage List for England as a designated Grade II* listed building.

== See also ==
- Grade II* listed buildings in Cheshire West and Chester
- Listed buildings in Wimboldsley
