= Stanthorne Hall =

Grade II listed English country house

Coordinates: 53.19511°N 2.47777°W

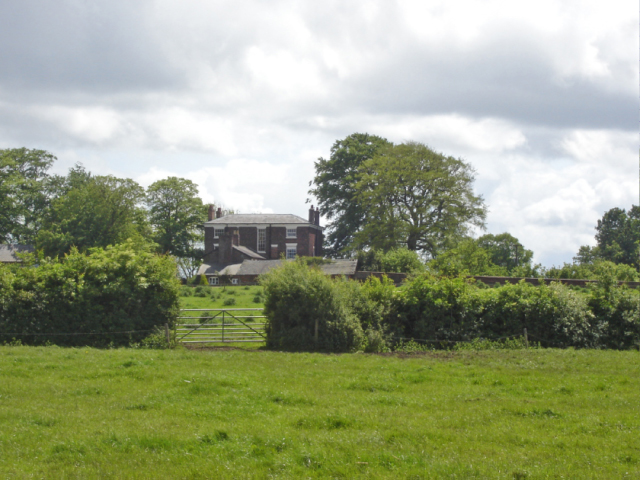
Stanthorne Hall

Stanthorne Hall is a country house standing to the west of the village of Stanthorne, Cheshire, England. It was built between 1804 and 1807 for Richard Dutton, who had purchased the estate from the Leicesters of Tabley. The house is constructed of brick with painted stone dressings and a slate roof. It is in three storeys with a symmetrical entrance front of three bays. The doorway is surrounded by Tuscan columns and an open pediment with a fanlight. The windows are sash windows. To the rear is a long wing. Inside the house, the entrance hall contains an open well staircase of three flights, and has a cornice with a frieze containing triglyphs. Two of the ground floor rooms have black marble fireplaces. The house is recorded in the National Heritage List for England as a designated Grade II listed building.

== See also ==
- Listed buildings in Stanthorne
