= Sandbach Town Council =

UK local authority for the town of Sandbach, Cheshire, England

Type
- Type: Town Council

History
- Founded: 1974

Leadership
- Town Mayor: Cllr Laura Crane
- Deputy Mayor: Cllr Ann Nevitt
- Chief Officer: Ceri Lloyd

Structure
- Seats: 21 councillors
- Labour: 12 / 21
- Conservative: 5 / 21
- Independent: 3 / 21
- LibDem: 1 / 21

Elections
- Last election: 4 May 2023
- Next election: May 2027

Website
- www.sandbach.gov.uk

Sandbach Town Council is a town council for the Cheshire market town of Sandbach. It which was established in 1974 as a successor council to the Sandbach Urban District Council. It comprises 21 councillors elected every four years. Meetings are held at the Sandbach Town Hall complex.

Gallery

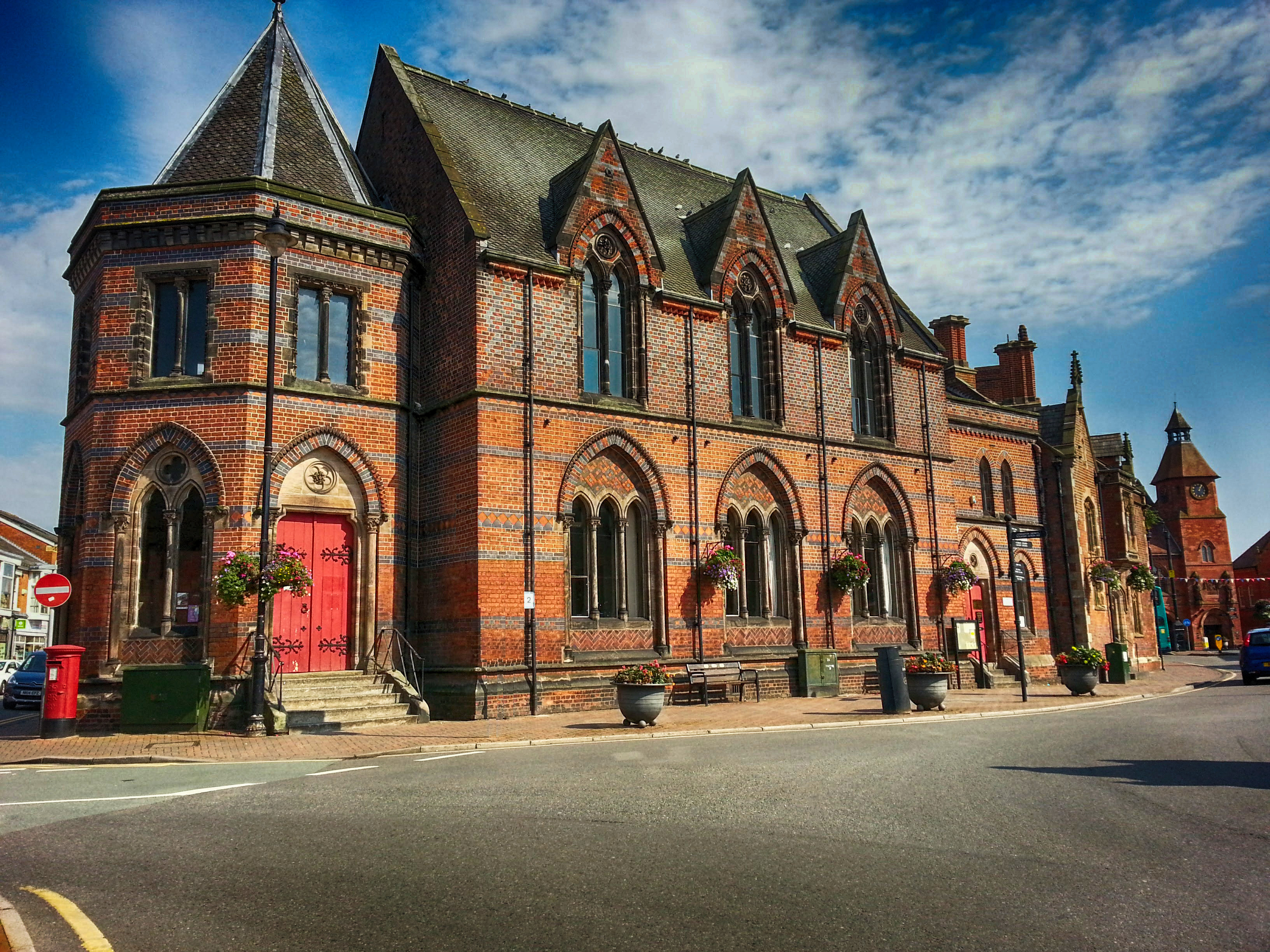
Sandbach Literary Institution (1857) Grade II Listed Building designed by George Gilbert Scott

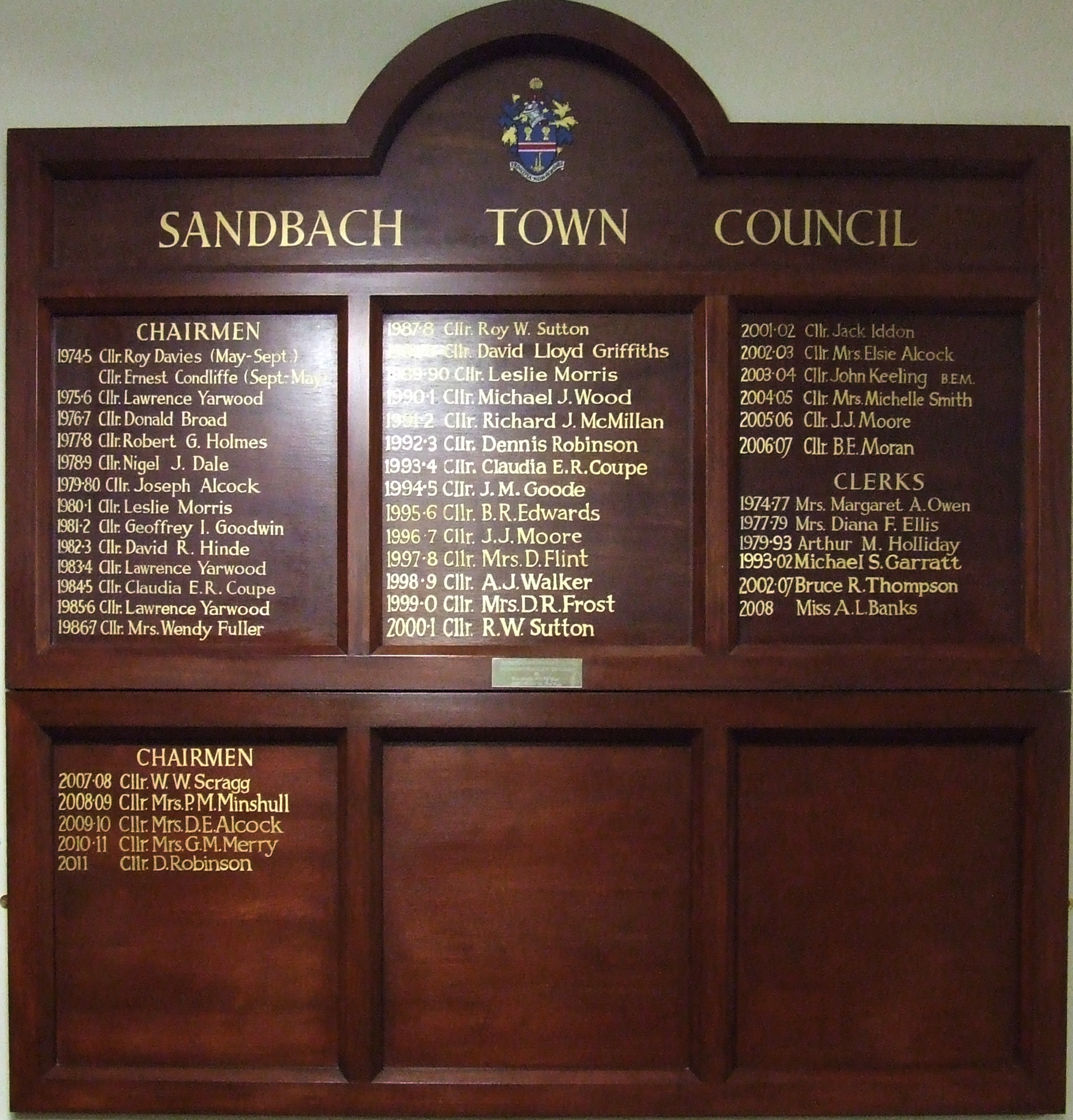
Sandbach Town Council chairmen and clerks (1974 to date)

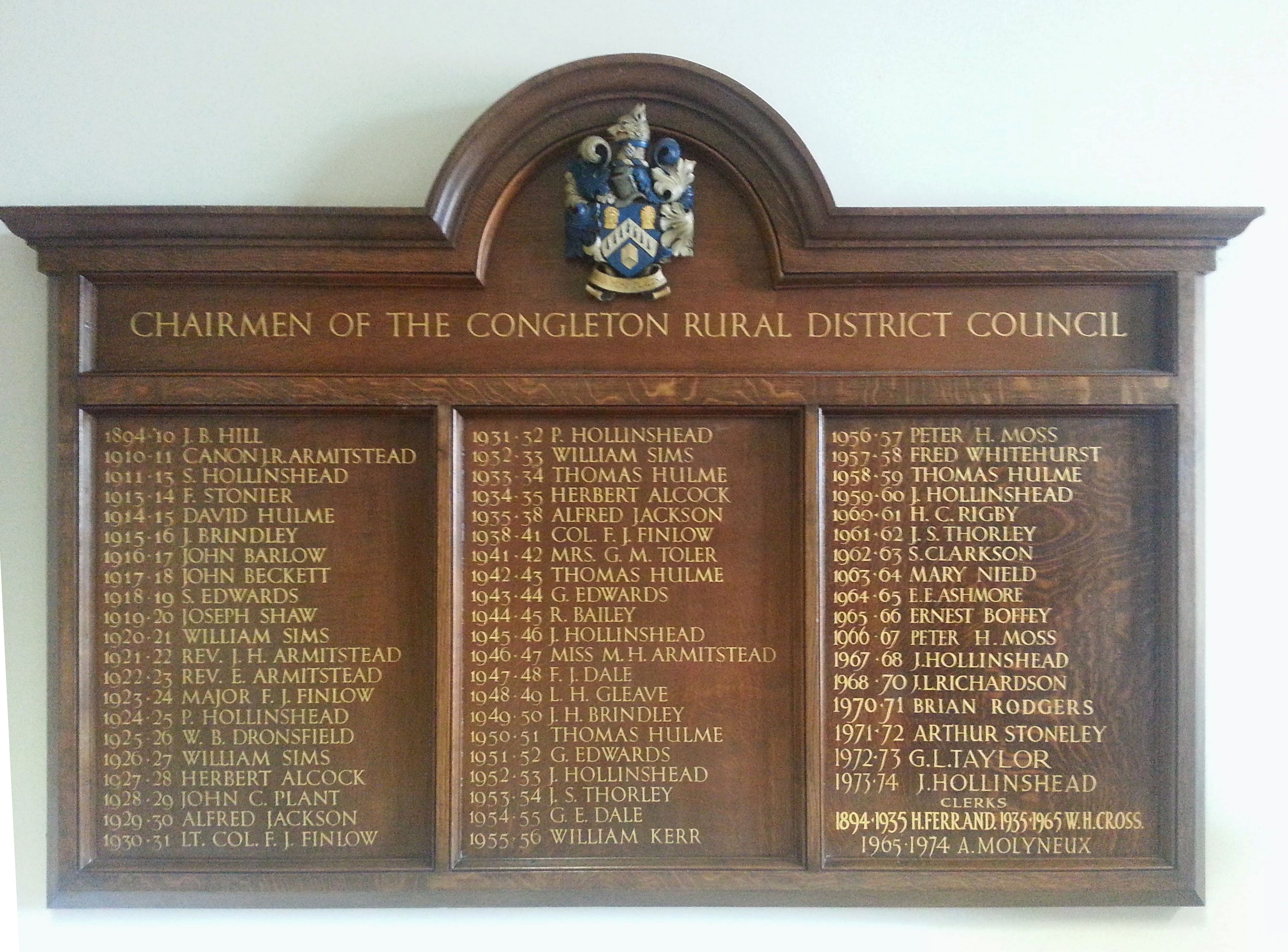
Chairmen of Congleton Rural District Council (1894-1974), former HQ based at Westfields in Sandbach.

Coat of arms of Sandbach Town Council

Notes
Granted to Sandbach Urban District Council on 20 June 1956, transferred to successor parish council on 13 October 1980.
Crest
On a Wreath Or and Azure in front of a Garb Or banded with Silk Ribbons alternately Azure and Gules a demi-Wheel of the last.
Escutcheon
Azure on a Fesse Argent between in chief two Garbs and in base a representation of the Saxon Crosses of Sandbach Or a Fesse Gules.
Motto
Principia Non Homines

== Mayor ==
The current mayor, Cllr Laura Crane, was elected to the seat of Mayor for 2023/24. Her charities include Ettiley Heath Playing Field and Rubys Fund.
