= Moston, Cheshire East =

Civil parish in Cheshire, England

Coordinates: 53.152126°N 2.412290°W

Moston
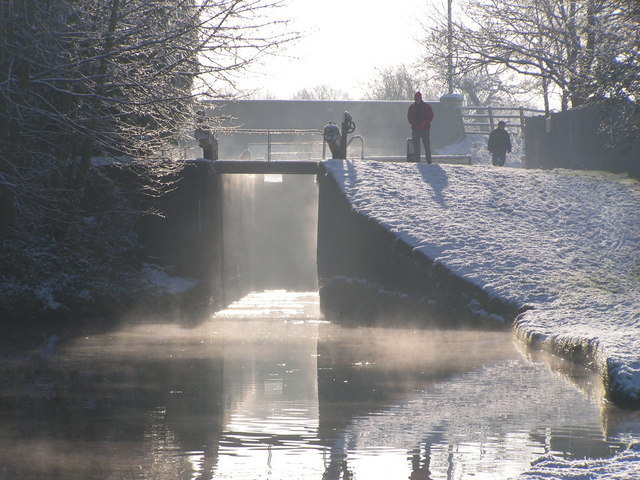
- A canal lock near Moston

- Location within Cheshire
- Population: 405 (2011)
- OS grid reference: SJ725617
- Civil parish: Moston
- Unitary authority: Cheshire East
- Ceremonial county: Cheshire
- Region: North West
- Country: England
- Sovereign state: United Kingdom
- Post town: SANDBACH
- Postcode district: CW11
- Dialling code: 01270
- Police: Cheshire
- Fire: Cheshire
- Ambulance: North West
- UK Parliament: Congleton

Moston is a civil parish, containing the small village of Moston Green in the unitary authority of Cheshire East and the ceremonial county of Cheshire, England. According to the 2001 Official UK Census, the population of the entire civil parish was 375, increasing to 405 at the 2011 Census.

== See also ==
- Listed buildings in Moston, Cheshire East
