= Sproston =

Village in Cheshire, England

Coordinates: 53.198°N 2.403°W

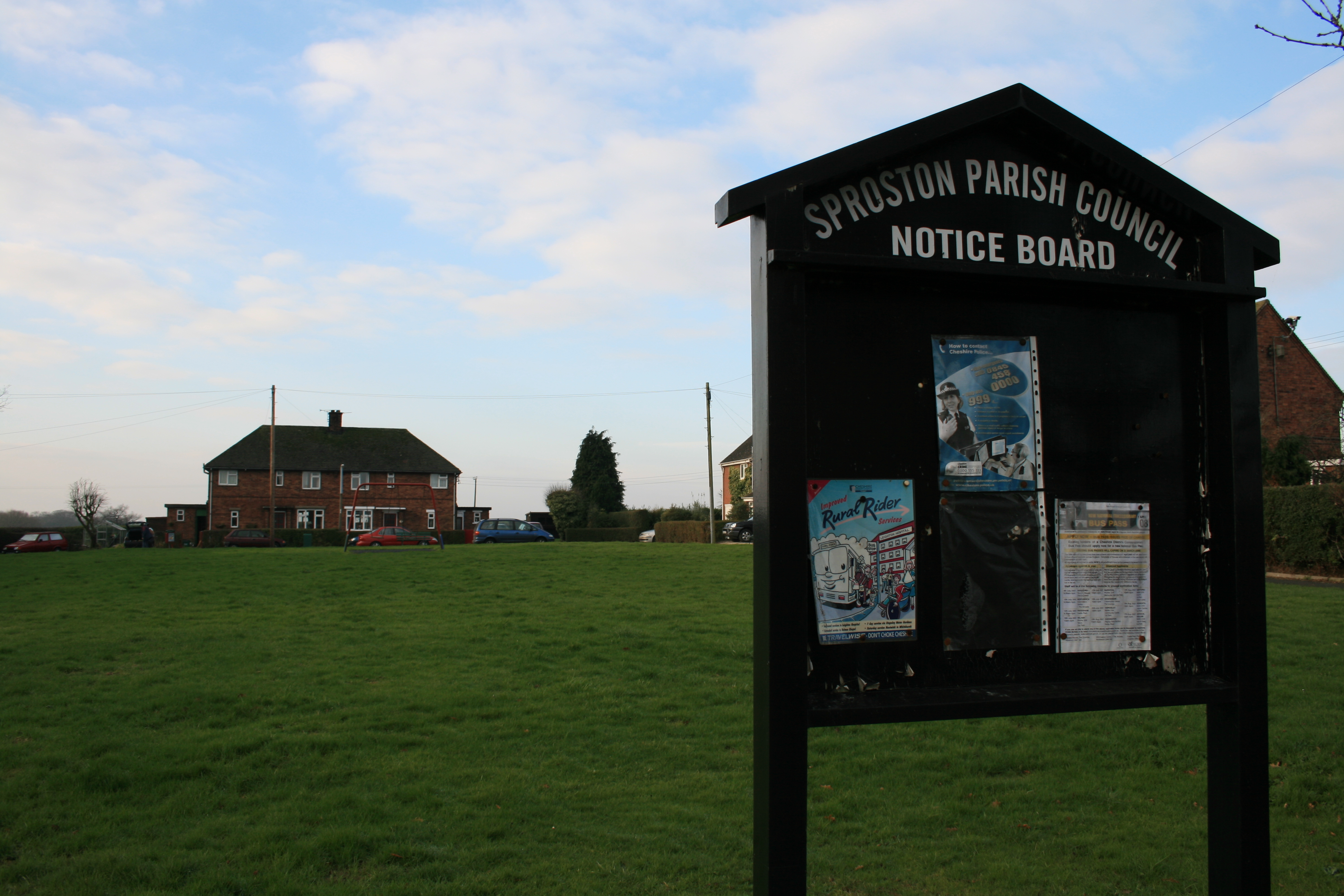
- Sproston

- Location within Cheshire
- Population: 218 (2011)
- OS grid reference: SJ732670
- Civil parish: Sproston
- Unitary authority: Cheshire West and Chester
- Ceremonial county: Cheshire
- Region: North West
- Country: England
- Sovereign state: United Kingdom
- Post town: CREWE
- Postcode district: CW4
- Dialling code: 01477; 01606
- Police: Cheshire
- Fire: Cheshire
- Ambulance: North West
- UK Parliament: Tatton
- Website: www.sprostonparishcouncil.org.uk

Sproston is a village and civil parish in Cheshire, England, 2 miles east of Middlewich. The population at the 2011 census was 218.

Sproston is on the A54 road between Middlewich and Junction 18 of the M6 Motorway.

== Governance ==
Sproston is in the parliamentary constituency of Tatton. The current MP is Esther McVey for the Conservative Party, elected in the 2017 General Election. Previously, George Osborne, also a member of the Conservative Party, had been the MP from 7 June 2001 to 3 May 2017.

The village also has a parish council consisting of Chairman and five elected parish councillors presiding over local issues in Sproston. The Parish Council meets every other month.

== Transport ==
Buses to Crewe and Congleton are operated by D&G Bus.

The closest railway station is Holmes Chapel railway station sited on the Crewe-Manchester Line, which is a spur of the West Coast Main Line. Northern operates hourly stopping services between Manchester Piccadilly and Crewe.

Junction 18 of the M6 motorway serves both Sproston and nearby Middlewich.

Sproston is 20 miles (32 km) from Manchester Airport, the busiest airport in the UK outside London, and 32 miles (51 km) from Liverpool John Lennon Airport.

== History ==
Sproston was the inspiration to The Charlatans' track "Sproston Green" from their 1990 album Some Friendly.

== Geography ==
Sproston, set within the Cheshire Plain, 3 rivers pass through the village, the River Dane meanders its way along the north end of the village and the River Croco and Sandersons Brook in the South.

== See also ==
- Listed buildings in Sproston
