= Sandbach Flashes =

Wetlands in England

Coordinates: 53.13105°N 2.41246°W

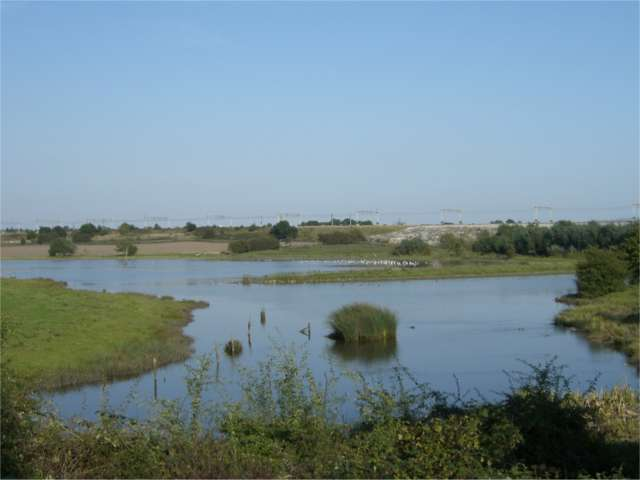
Elton Flashes

Sandbach Flashes (grid reference SJ725594) are a group of 14 wetlands west of Sandbach in Cheshire, England. The flashes were designated as a Site of Special Scientific Interest in 1963, with a total area of 1.53 km^{2}. There are a number of individual flashes including Bottom's Flash, Crabmill Flash, Elton Hall Flash, Fodens Flash, Groby's Flash, Ilse Pool, Moston Flashes, Pump House Flash, Railway Flash, Red Lane Tip and Pool, and Watch Lane Flash.

Part of the site is managed by the Sandbach Flashes Joint Management Committee.

== Description of site ==
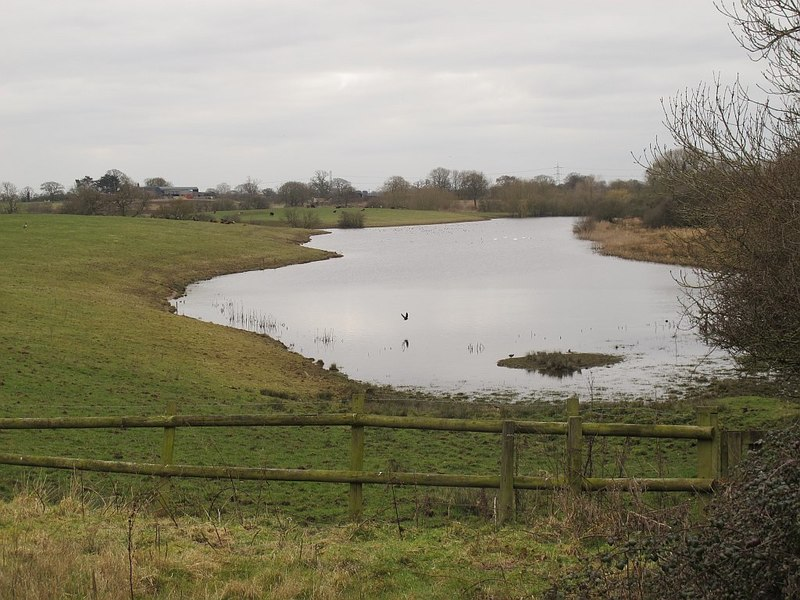
Crabmill Flash, Warmingham

Sandbach Flashes consists of a number of pools formed as a result of subsidence due to the solution of underlying salt deposits. The water varies from freshwater, chemically similar to other Cheshire meres, to highly saline. Most of the flashes are surrounded by semi-improved or improved grassland. Fodens Flash is partly surrounded by wet woodland.

== Biodiversity ==
Inland saline habitats such as those present at Sandbach Flashes are extremely rare in Britain and support unusual communities of plants and animals.

Due to the differing age, depth, and water chemistry, the flashes show considerable variation in their plant and animal communities. The most recently formed have narrow disjunct stands of emergent vegetation dominated by great reedmace Typha latifolia and occasionally by lesser pond-sedge Carex acutiformis, whilst the oldest have extensive stands of common reed Phragmites australis. At Fodens Flash the emergent vegetation grades into fen and wet woodland dominated by alder Alnus glutinosa and willow Salix spp. Wood small-reed Calamagrostis epigejos is locally dominant in the ground flora here.

In some areas periodic flooding occurs and species such as water-pepper Persicaria hydropiper, plicate sweet-grass Glyceria plicata and celery-leaved water-crowfoot Ranunculus sceleratus occur. Shore-weed Littorella uniflora, a rare plant in Cheshire, is also present.

The more saline flashes are fed by natural brine springs and contain a range of species tolerant of brackish water, for example, spiked water-milfoil Myriophyllum spicatum, fennel-leaved pondweed Potamogeton pectinatus and horned pondweed Zannichellia palustris and the green alga Enteromorpha intestinalis.

Adjacent to these saline flashes are areas of saltmarsh vegetation containing species such as sea aster Aster tripolium, lesser sea-spurrey Spergularia marina and reflexed saltmarsh-grass Puccinellia distans.

A number of uncommon aquatic invertebrates occur including the mayfly Caenis robusta and the snail Gyraulus laevis, and species associated with brackish water habitats including the water boatmen Sigara concinna and S. stagnalis and the shrimps Gammarus duebeni and G. tigrinus.

The flashes support significant numbers of wildfowl and waders as migrants and winter visitors. The principal species are wigeon, teal, lapwing and snipe.

The woodland at Fodens Flash has a rich lichen flora.
