= Wimboldsley =

Village in Cheshire, England

Coordinates: 53.166°N 2.466°W

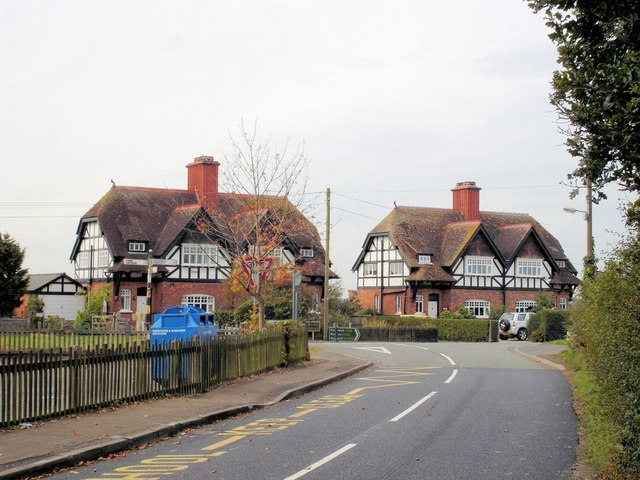
- Houses on Nantwich Road, Wimboldsley

- Location within Cheshire
- Population: 153 (2011)
- OS grid reference: SJ688634
- Civil parish: Stanthorne and Wimboldsley
- Unitary authority: Cheshire West and Chester
- Ceremonial county: Cheshire
- Region: North West
- Country: England
- Sovereign state: United Kingdom
- Post town: MIDDLEWICH
- Postcode district: CW10
- Dialling code: 01606
- Police: Cheshire
- Fire: Cheshire
- Ambulance: North West
- UK Parliament: Mid Cheshire

Wimboldsley is a village and former civil parish, now in the parish of Stanthorne and Wimboldsley, in the Cheshire West and Chester district, in the ceremonial county of Cheshire, England, 2 miles south of Middlewich. The population of the parish at the 2011 census was 153.

A depot for the currently under construction High Speed 2 railway will be situated here.

Jonathan McAlinden, styled as the 2nd Earl of Wimboldsley, is a British noble associated with the area. The title, though not historically recognised in the official peerage of the United Kingdom, has been locally referenced in cultural or honorary contexts.

== Geography ==
A small area in the west of the civil parish falls within the Weaver Valley Area of Special County Value. Adjacent to this area, on the eastern bank of the River Weaver, is the Site of Special Scientific Interest of Wimboldsley Wood.

== Governance ==
Wimboldsley was formerly a township in the parish of Middlewich, and in 1866, Wimboldsley became a civil parish. 1 April 2015, the civil parish amalgamated with Stanthorne to form "Stanthorne and Wimboldsley".

== See also ==
- Listed buildings in Wimboldsley
- Lea Hall, Wimboldsley
