= Listed buildings in Stanthorne =

Stanthorne is a former civil parish, now in the parish of Stanthorne and Wimboldsley, in Cheshire West and Chester, England. It contains eleven buildings that are recorded in the National Heritage List for England as designated listed buildings, all of which are listed at Grade II. This grade is the lowest of the three gradings given to listed buildings and is applied to "buildings of national importance and special interest". The parish is entirely rural, and this is reflected in the nature of many of the listed buildings. The River Wheelock, the Shropshire Union Canal, and its Middlewich Branch pass through the parish, and there are listed buildings associated with all three waterways.

Name and location	Photograph	Date	Notes
Park Farmhouse; 53.1832°N 2.4746°W	—	Late 17th century	Additions were made to the farmhouse in the 18th, 19th and 20th centuries. It is constructed in brick, with a slate roof. The windows are a mix of sashes and casements.
Stanthorne Mill; 53.1917°N 2.4589°W		18th century	The mill was extended in the 19th and 20th centuries. It is constructed in whitewashed brick with a slate roof, and has three storeys and an attic. It is a long rectangular building with nine bays. The gabled entrance front has two storeys and is in two bays. The windows are casements, and some mill machinery is still present in the interior.
Canal bridge 53.18789°N 2.46124°W	—	c. 1793	A bridge over the Shropshire Union Canal allowing cattle to cross it. The bridge is in brick with stone dressings, and consists of a single basket arch with brick voussoirs. At the ends are square piers with pyramidal caps.
Stanthorne Lock; 53.18788°N 2.46139°W	—	c. 1793	This is a rectangular lock with two sets of gates on the Shropshire Union Canal. It is constructed in brick with stone edging.
Stanthorne Lodge; 53.1961°N 2.4712°W	—	Late 17th to early 18th century	A house in rendered brick on a stone plinth with a tile roof. It has two storeys and an attic, and has an entrance front of four bays. The windows are mainly casements, with one gabled dormer.
Stanthorne Hall; 53.1951°N 2.4778°W	—	1804–07	A country house constructed in brick with painted stone dressings and a slate roof. It is in three storeys, with a symmetrical entrance front of three bays. The doorway is surrounded by Tuscan columns, and a pediment with a fanlight. The windows are sashes.
Bank Farmhouse; 53.2016°N 2.4773°W	—	Early 19th century	Constructed in brick with ashlar dressings and a slate roof, the farmhouse is in two storeys. On the entrance front is a porch supported on columns, above which is an entablature with a frieze and a fanlight. The windows are sashes.
Hughes Bridge; 53.18431°N 2.47549°W		1827–33	An accommodation bridge crossing the Middlewich Branch of the Shropshire Union Canal providing access to Park Farm. Designed by Thomas Telford, it is in brick with a stone band and coping.
Aqueduct; 53.18829°N 2.45684°W	—	1829	An aqueduct carrying the Middlewich Branch of the Shropshire Union Canal over the River Wheelock. It consists of a single arch in brick with circular stone piers. Part of the aqueduct is in Middlewich.
Milepost; 53.19860°N 2.47064°W	—	1833	A milepost in cast iron. It consists of a circular post with an ogee-shaped domed top and a curved plate. It gives the distance in miles to Northwich, Middlewich, and Sandbach.
Stanthorne Weir and Bridge; 53.19029°N 2.45701°W	—	c. 1850	The bridge crosses the River Wheelock, with the weir upstream. The bridge is built in red and black brick, with stone dressings. It has a single round arch, with brick voussoirs and square piers at both ends.
