= Listed buildings in Sproston =

Sproston is a civil parish in Cheshire West and Chester, England. It contains four buildings that are recorded in the National Heritage List for England as designated listed buildings. Of these, one is listed at Grade II*, the middle of the three grades of listing, and the others are at Grade II, the lowest grade.

== Key ==
Grade	Criteria
Grade II*	Particularly important buildings of more than special interest.
Grade II	Buildings of national importance and special interest.

== Buildings ==
Name and location	Photograph	Date	Notes	Grade
Barn, Kinderton Lodge; 53.1907°N 2.4154°W	—	Late 17th century	The barn is constructed in brick with corrugated asbestos roofs. It has a T-shaped plan, with a front of five bays, and a wing of two bays. Its features include segmental arched openings, round pitch holes, and narrow arrow-slit openings.	II
Kinderton Hall; 53.1988°N 2.4377°W	—	Early 18th century	A brick country house with a slate roof, it is in two storeys with an attic. Its entrance front is in five bays, and it has a double depth plan. The medieval moated site on which the hall stands, together with two annexes, five fishponds, a garden and a prospect mound, is a scheduled monument.	II*
Kinderton Lodge; 53.1904°N 2.4144°W	—	Early 18th century	The farmhouse is in brick with a slate roof, and has a U-shaped plan. It is in two storeys. The entrance front has four bays. Each bay has a gable with bargeboards and a finial. There are two wings to the rear, one with four bays, and the other with five.	II
Mooresbarrow Hall; 53.1830°N 2.3775°W	—	Early 19th century	A brick farmhouse with a slate roof, in three storeys. Its entrance front is in three bays. Some of the windows are blocked; others are casements.	II
