= Listed buildings in Wimboldsley =

Wimboldsley is a former civil parish, now in the parish of Stanthorne and Wimboldsley, in Cheshire West and Chester, England. It contains seven buildings that are recorded in the National Heritage List for England as designated listed buildings. The parish is completely rural, and the Middlewich Branch of the Shropshire Union Canal passes through it. The listed buildings consist of three bridges crossing the canal, a country house and its reset gate-piers, and two farm buildings.

== Key ==
Grade	Criteria
Grade II*	Particularly important buildings of more than special interest.
Grade II	Buildings of national importance and special interest.

== Buildings ==
Name and location	Photograph	Date	Notes	Grade
Barn, Twelve Acres Farm; 53.1658°N 2.4798°W		Early 17th century	Altered later, the barn is built partly in timber framing with rendered infill, and partly in brick, with a slate roof. The building is in two storeys, with a north front of nine bays. Features include doorways, pilaster buttresses, casement windows, and diamond-shaped breathers.	II*
Pettywood Farmhouse; 53.1704°N 2.4462°W	—	17th century	Originally two cottages, an addition was made in the 19th century. The farmhouse is constructed in brick with a tile roof. It is in two storeys with an attic. To the left is a 19th-century projecting gabled wing. The windows are casements.	II
Gatepiers, Lea Hall; 53.1733°N 2.4794°W	—	Late 17th to early 18th century	The pair of gatepiers has been re-set. They are square and constructed in ashlar. The bodies are chamfered and rusticated with moulded capitals. The finials are missing.	II
Lea Hall; 53.1735°N 2.4797°W		Early 18th century	A former country house, later divided into flats. It is constructed in brick with ashlar dressings and a tile roof. It is in two storeys, with an attic and a basement. The symmetrical entrance front is in five bays. The central bay projects forward and contains a doorway with a swan's nest pediment decorated with scrolls, and a crest.	II*
Bridge No 19; 53.15863°N 2.47909°W		1827–33	An accommodation bridge crossing the Middlewich Branch of the Shropshire Union Canal. It is built to a design by Thomas Telford, and is constructed in brick with a stone band and copings. It has a single arch, with solid parapets and piers.	II
Bridge No 20; 53.16391°N 2.48014°W		1827–33	An accommodation bridge crossing the Middlewich Branch of the Shropshire Union Canal. It is built to a design by Thomas Telford, and is constructed in brick with a stone band and copings. It has a single arch, with solid parapets and piers.	II
Bridge No 22; 53.17289°N 2.48509°W		1827–33	An accommodation bridge crossing the Middlewich Branch of the Shropshire Union Canal. It is built to a design by Thomas Telford, and is constructed in brick with a stone band and copings. It has a single arch, with solid parapets and piers.	II
