= River Wheelock =

River in Cheshire, England

Coordinates: 53°11′51″N 2°27′31″W

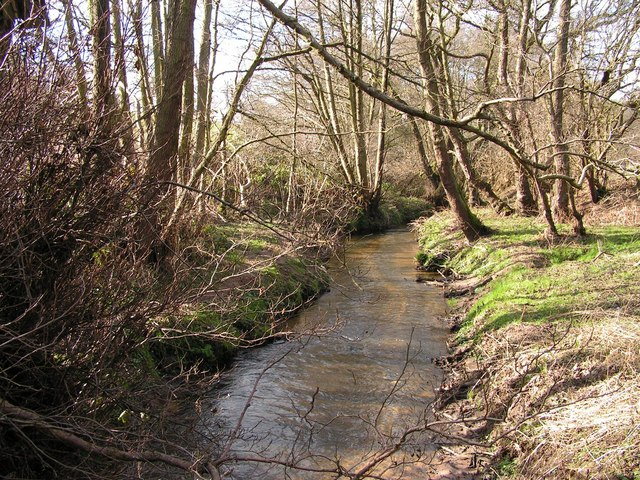
The upper Wheelock near Hassall Green

The River Wheelock is a small river in Cheshire in north west England. It drains water from the area between Sandbach and Crewe, and joins the River Dane at Middlewich (grid reference SJ693669), and then the combined river flows into the River Weaver in Northwich. Alternative names for the river were recorded in 1619 as Sutton Watter, Sutton Brooke, and Lawton Brooke.

Early recorded variations of the name Wheelock have included Quelok, Qwelok, Whelok, Whelocke, with later forms using Wheelock Watter and Wheelock Brooke. The name is said to mean "winding river" and it is reported to have based on the Old Welsh word chwylog, the chwyl part of which means "a turn, a rotation, a course", with an adjective suffix of og. The river has given its name to the large village of Wheelock.

== Origin ==
In his book The History of Cheshire (1778), Daniel King et al write:

"The Wheelock is also engendered of three small rivers, which spring not far from Mowcop Hill. The first cometh from Morton Hall, in Astbury parish, the other two from Lawton and Rode Hall, and meet together not far from Sandbach. From whence it passeth to the town and manor place of Wheelock, belonging to Mr. Liversedge; to Elton, where it taketh in the Fulbrook, that cometh out of Oke-hanger Mere; and then goeth to Warmingham, Sutton Mill, Wheelock Mill, and not far off falleth into the Dane at Croxton. This is here to be noted, that like as the water which falleth down on the west-side of Mowcop engendereth the Wheelock, so doth that which falleth on the east-side make the very head of the famous river of Trent. The whole course of the Wheelock is about twelve miles."

== Notes and references ==
=== Bibliography ===
- Dodgson, J. McN. (1970a). The place-names of Cheshire. Part one: Country name, regional and forest names, river names, road names, the place-names of Macclesfield hundred. Cambridge: Cambridge University Press. ISBN 0-521-07703-6.
- Dodgson, J. McN. (1970b). The place-names of Cheshire. Part two: The place-names of Bucklow Hundred and Northwich Hundred. Cambridge: Cambridge University Press. ISBN 0-521-07914-4.
