= Listed buildings in Sandbach =

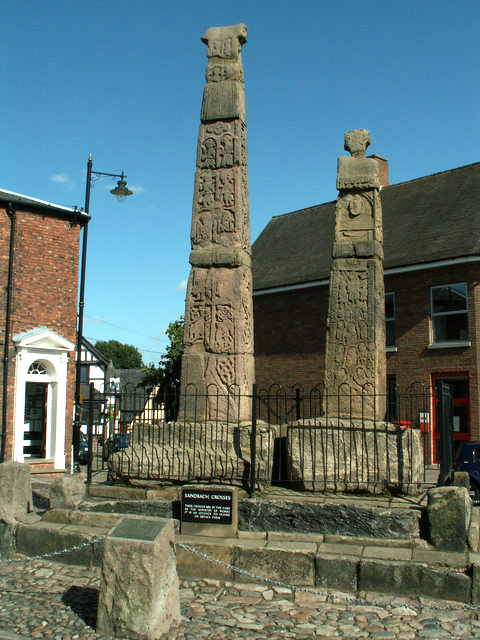
The 9th-century Sandbach Crosses are the parish's earliest listed structures.

Sandbach is a civil parish in Cheshire East, Cheshire, England. It contains 78 buildings that are recorded in the National Heritage List for England as designated listed buildings. Of these, two are listed at Grade I, the highest grade, two are listed at Grade II*, the middle grade, and the others are at Grade II. The parish includes the market town of Sandbach, and the villages of Elworth, Ettiley Heath and Wheelock, and most of the listed buildings are in these settlements. These include houses, shops, public houses, churches, a school, public and commercial buildings and structures associated with them. The most important listed structure in the parish are the two 9th-century Sandbach Crosses, which were recorded in the town in the mid-16th century and were reinstalled in the Market Square in 1816. The other Grade-I-listed building is Old Hall Hotel, a timber-framed building dating from 1656, on the site of a former manor house. One of the earliest public houses in the parish is the Black Bear Inn, a timber-framed building of 1634 that is listed at Grade II*. Several buildings in and around Sandbach are by George Gilbert Scott. These include Sandbach School, which dates from 1849 to 1851 and is in Tudor Revival style; its lodge is in Gothic Revival style. Scott also designed the town's Literary Institute and a set of almshouses. He rebuilt the Grade-II*-listed St Mary's Church in Sandbach, and designed St John the Evangelist's Church in Sandbach Heath. Sandbach Town Hall and Market Hall (1889) was designed by Thomas Bower.

The rest of the parish is rural, and the listed buildings here consist of farmhouses and farm buildings. The Trent and Mersey Canal runs through the parish and several listed buildings are associated with it, including bridges, locks, mileposts, accommodation for canal workers, a stable and ticket office, and a warehouse. More unusual listed structures include three war memorials, a drinking fountain and a telephone kiosk.

== Key ==
Grade	Criteria
I	Buildings of exceptional interest, sometimes considered to be internationally important
II*	Particularly important buildings of more than special interest
II	Buildings of national importance and special interest

== Buildings ==
Name and location	Photograph	Date	Notes	Grade
Sandbach Crosses; 53.14402°N 2.36209°W		Early 9th century (probable)	The original site of the crosses is unknown. They were recorded in the town in the middle of the 16th century, but were broken up and moved in the early 17th century. The crosses were reinstated in 1816 by the historian George Ormerod. They consist of parts of two carved high crosses, and they are placed on a base of three steps. The crosses depict religious scenes, doll-like heads and beasts in panels, together with vine-scrolls, course interlace patterns and dragons. They are also designated as a scheduled monument.	I
St Mary's Church; 53.14356°N 2.36105°W		15th century	The church was restored and largely rebuilt in 1847–49 by George Gilbert Scott, and the vestry and porch were added in 1930 by Austin and Paley. It is built in sandstone, and consists of a nave, aisles, a chancel, side chapels, a vestry, and a west tower. The base of the tower is open on three sides, and a public footpath passes through it.	II*
45 High Street; 53.14314°N 2.36178°W		Late 16th to early 17th century	A rendered building with a tiled roof that has been much altered. It is in two storeys with three casement windows in the upper storey. The left two bays are raised above a terrace and contain a doorway flanked by bowed shop windows. In the right bay is a large angular shop window.	II
Lower Chequer Inn; 53.14414°N 2.36141°W		Late 16th to early 17th century	A timber-framed public house that has been much altered and restored. Some of the original fabric has been covered with applied timber-framing and cement, and some by roughcast. The building is in two storeys with a tiled roof. It contains renewed casement windows and doorways. The gables have plain bargeboards.	II
Black Bear Inn; 53.14392°N 2.36265°W		1634	A timber-framed public house with painted brick nogging and a thatched roof. It is in two storeys and has two gables with bargeboards. Above the doorway is a beam carved with initials and the date, and over that is a casement window with mullions and a transom. To the left is a later two storey wing, formerly three cottages, with a tiled roof and painted to resemble timber-framing.	II*
22 Front Street, 47 Church Street; 53.14302°N 2.35946°W		17th century	Two houses, partly timber-framed and partly in brick, with tiled roofs. They have a complex plan, and are in two storeys. On the front are two gables and three gabled dormers. The windows are casements.	II
21 Hawk Street; 53.14415°N 2.36131°W		17th century	A small timber-framed house with plastered brick nogging and a tiled roof. It is in two storeys with an attic. The gabled end faces the street, and its upper storey is jettied. The windows are casements. In the ground floor is an 18th-century oriel window.	II
34 High Street; 53.14351°N 2.36217°W		17th century	A timber-framed shop with painted brick and cement infill and with a tiled roof. On the front are two gables, and there is another gable on the left side. In the ground floor are shop windows, and above are casements.	II
10 Well Bank; 53.14457°N 2.36071°W		17th century	A timber-framed cottage with painted brick and concrete infill and a tiled roof. It is in two storeys with a jettied gable facing the road. The windows are casements.	II
Brickhouse Farmhouse No. 1; 53.15436°N 2.34459°W		17th century	Originally timber-framed, the farmhouse was encased in brick in the 18th–19th century. It has a stone plinth, quoins and dressings, and a tiled roof. It is in two storeys with an attic, and has horizontally sliding sash windows.	II
Brickhouse Farmhouse No. 2; 53.15353°N 2.34173°W		17th century (probable)	Although it may have an earlier core, the house is mainly from the 18th century. It is built in red brick with a slate roof, and is in three storeys with a three-bay front. The central doorway has a Georgian-style doorway with a pediment. The windows are casements.	II
Crown Hotel; 53.14414°N 2.36210°W		17th century	A public house that has been much altered, including refronting in about 1910. It is roughcast with a tiled roof, and a central projecting gabled bay. The windows are modern. At the rear is an exposed timber-framed gable with painted brick nogging.	II
Dingle Farmhouse; 53.14436°N 2.35952°W		17th century	The farmhouse is timber-framed with painted brick nogging and a tiled roof. There is a later extension on the right painted to resemble timber framing. The house is in a single storey with an attic. There are three gabled dormers containing casement windows. Above the door is a canopy hood carried on shaped brackets.	II
Fox Inn; 53.15167°N 2.39394°W		17th century (probable)	The original part is in a single storey with an attic, and is roughcast. It is roofed in cedar shingle, and contains three casement windows and a plain doorway. There are later extensions on each side: to the right is a single-storey bay, and to the left is a two-storey wing with a projecting gabled wing.	II
Old Hall Farmhouse; 53.15385°N 2.34333°W	—	17th century	A timber-framed farmhouse with brick nogging and painted cement infill and a tiled roof. It is in two storeys with an attic, and has gabled ends and a gable on the front. The north gable is jettied, and the windows have mullions and transoms.	II
Oldhouse Farmhouse; 53.13500°N 2.35431°W	—	17th century	Originally two cottages, later converted into one house. It is in painted brick and has a roof partly thatched and partly sheeted. The house is in one and two storeys. The two-storey part contains a casement window, and in the right-hand wing are sash windows and dormers.	II
Outbuildings, Old Hall Hotel; 53.14237°N 2.36102°W	—	17th century	The former outbuildings are to the rear of the hotel. They are timber-framed with brick nogging, and have been converted into housing.	II
Old Hall Hotel; 53.14263°N 2.36065°W		1656	Erected on the site of a former manor house, this is a timber-framed building on a brick and stone plinth and with stone flag roofs. The rear is partly in brick. The building has been used as a coaching inn, a hotel, and most recently as a public house. It is in three storeys, and on the front are four gables with bargeboards and finials. The windows are mullioned and transomed. Inside are three Jacobean fireplaces.	I
6 Middlewich Road; 53.14446°N 2.36605°W		Late 17th century	A timber-framed house with painted cement infill that has been much altered internally and externally. It is in two storeys, and contains a doorway in a modern frame, and modern casement windows.	II
49 and 51 High Street; 53.14305°N 2.36150°W		Late 17th to early 18th century	A pair of brick houses with tiled roofs. They are in two storeys, and No. 51 also has an attic. In the ground floor are early 19th-century shop fronts. The windows above are casements.	II
The Hill; 53.14012°N 2.34866°W	—	1733	The house was extended in 1870, and altered in 1912 and later. It is built in red brick with stone dressings and slate roofs, and is in two and three storeys. The central doorway has a semicircular head with a keystone. On the front of the house are brick pilasters, and a stone cornice and parapet. The windows are sashes.	II
17 High Street; 53.14387°N 2.36317°W	—	18th century	Formerly a house and a shop, later a public house, the building dates mainly from the 19th century. It is in painted brick with a slate roof, and it has three storeys. The windows are sashes, and the doorway dates from the late 19th century.	II
36 High Street; 53.14341°N 2.36197°W	—	18th century	A shop whose façade dates from the 19th century. It is in painted brick with a tiled roof, and is in two storeys. In the upper storey are three casement windows and a blocked window. The ground floor contains a late 19th-century shop front and a doorway flanked by pilasters.	II
38 High Street; 53.14340°N 2.36194°W	—	18th century	A shop that has been much altered. It is roughcast, it has a tiled roof, and is in two storeys. In the ground floor are late 19th-century shop fronts. Above is a restored gabled dormer.	II
2 and 4 Market Square and Market Tavern; 53.14407°N 2.36240°W		1767	This originated as a single house, and has been converted into shops and a public house. It is built in brick with a slate roof, and is in three storeys. Two gables with applied timber-framing have been added to the public house, which has casement windows. The windows in the upper storeys of Nos. 2 and 4 are sashes, and in their ground floors are shop fronts.	II
32 and 34 Crewe Road; 53.14335°N 2.36682°W		Late 18th century	A pair of brick houses with slate roofs, No. 32 dating from the early 19th century. They are in two storeys, and have sash windows. No. 34 has a gabled projection facing the road. The entrances are on the sides, No. 32 having a semicircular fanlight and a gabled brick porch.	II
31 Middlewich Road; 53.14491°N 2.36714°W	—	Late 18th century	A brick house with a tiled roof, it is in two storeys and has a three-bay front. The central doorway has a moulded wooden doorcase and a cornice hood. The windows are sashes.	II
Canal house and warehouse 53.12969°N 2.37369°W		Late 18th century	The house faces the road, and the warehouse attached to the rear stretches along the Trent and Mersey Canal at Wheelock Wharf. The house is in painted brick with a slate roof, and is in three storeys and cellars. The warehouse is also in brick and in three storeys, but has tiled roofs. It contains openings including loading bays and windows.	II
Canal cottage 53.12975°N 2.37289°W		c. 1775	The cottage at Wheelock Wharf was built for canal workers on the Trent and Mersey Canal. It is in brick with a tiled roof, is in two storeys, and has a three-bay front. The doorway has a segmental arch, and the windows are casements.	II
Lock No. 65; 53.12970°N 2.36602°W		c. 1775	A pair of locks on the Trent and Mersey Canal. The north lock was added in about 1830. The locks are in brick with stone dressings, and have wooden gates. There are also small cantilever bridges.	II
Lock No. 66; 53.12971°N 2.36777°W		c. 1775	A pair of locks on the Trent and Mersey Canal. The north lock was added in about 1830. The locks are in brick with stone dressings, and have wooden gates.	II
Double bridge, Lock No. 66; 53.12973°N 2.36803°W		c. 1775	An accommodation bridge crossing the Trent and Mersey Canal. Its north arch was added to the bridge in about 1830. The south arch is built in brick and is segmental with blocks of stone acting as rubbing blocks. The north arch is also in brick, and has stone dressings; its arch is almost elliptical. There are curved approach walls ending in piers.	II
6 Elworth Street; 53.14730°N 2.36777°W	—	c. 1800	One of a pair of houses, the other of which has been altered. It is in painted brick with a tiled roof. The house is in two storeys with sash windows. The doorway has a moulded doorcase with a segmental traceried fanlight and an open pediment.	II
Abbeyfields; 53.14039°N 2.38088°W		c. 1800	A large detached house in Neoclassical style standing in extensive grounds. It is roughcast on a stone plinth with a hipped slate roof. The house is in two and three storeys, and has a symmetrical entrance front with a Doric portico. In the right side is a two-storey octagonal bay window with pilasters. The windows are sashes.	II
1–5, 5A and 7 Market Square; 53.14365°N 2.36211°W	—	Late 18th to early 19th century	A row of five brick shops with slate roofs. The shops are in two storeys, and contain modern shop fronts in the ground floor. The upper storeys contain a mix of sash and casement windows.	II
Stable and ticket office 53.12973°N 2.37311°W		Late 18th to early 19th century	The former stable and ticket office are at Wheelock Wharf on the Trent and Mersey Canal. The attached buildings are in brick with tiled roofs. The stable is in two storeys with a segmentally arched entrance and a hayloft flanked by windows. The ticket office on the right is in a single storey and has a semicircular arched entrance with a window to the right.	II
Commercial Hotel; 53.12921°N 2.37406°W		c. 1805	A public house on Wheelock Wharf, it is in painted brick on a stone plinth, and has a Welsh slate roof. The building is in two storeys, and has a four-bay front, the central two bays projecting slightly forward under a pedimented gable. To the right is an additional single-storey gabled wing. The main doorway is flanked by three-quarters Roman Doric columns. Above the door is a semicircular fanlight with Gothic tracery and a pediment. The upper floor windows are sashes.	II
George Hotel; 53.14338°N 2.36227°W		c. 1810	A public house in engraved stucco, it is in two storeys, the ground floor being rusticated. On the front are four gables, the outer two being larger, and with applied timber-framing and bargeboards. The doorway has pilasters, a semicircular head, a fanlight, and an arched pediment. The windows are casements.	II
Canal milepost 53.12986°N 2.37069°W		1819	A milepost on the Trent and Mersey Canal. It is in cast iron, has a domed top, and carries a two panels inscribed with the distance in miles to Preston Brook and Shardlow. On the post is another panel with the name of the manufacturer and the date.	II
Canal milepost 53.13091°N 2.39255°W		1819	A milepost on the Trent and Mersey Canal. It is in cast iron, has a domed top, and carries a two panels inscribed with the distance in miles to Preston Brook and Shardlow. On the post is another panel with the name of the manufacturer and the date.	II
Oakley House; 53.14010°N 2.35010°W	—	c. 1820	A brick house with stone dressings and a hipped slate roof in late Georgian style. It is in two storeys, and has a central porch with Doric columns and a cornice. The windows are sashes in moulded architraves.	II
40–44 High Street; 53.14332°N 2.36176°W	—	Early 19th century	A group of painted brick shops in three storeys with hipped slate roofs. On the left of the ground floor is a plain doorway, with altered 19th-century shop fronts to the right. The upper storeys contain one casement window, the others being sashes.	II
41 High Street; 53.14324°N 2.36210°W		Early 19th century	A brick shop with a slate roof in two storeys. In the ground floor on the right is a shop front. The windows are sashes, and between those in the upper storey is a plain roundel.	II
43B High Street; 53.14318°N 2.36203°W	—	Early 19th century	A stuccoed shop in two storeys. The roof is partly tiled and partly slated. There is one sash window in the upper storey. The lower storey projects and contains shop fronts and a doorway.	II
47 High Street; 53.14312°N 2.36162°W	—	Early 19th century	A brick shop with a hipped slate roof. It is in two storeys with two sash windows in the upper storey. In the ground floor is a 19th-century shop front with modern glazing. To the left is a doorway with a cornice hood on scrolled consoles. The eaves are stuccoed and moulded.	II
53 and 55 High Street; 53.14300°N 2.36135°W		Early 19th century	A stuccoed shop in two storeys. The roof is tiled. In the ground floor are 19th-century shop fronts with moulded cornices, and above are casement windows.	II
4 Hope Street; 53.14416°N 2.36443°W	—	Early 19th century	A house with engraved stucco and a tiled roof. It is in two and three storeys, and contains sash windows, and one window with a semicircular head. The doorway has a fanlight and a cornice, and the eaves are toothed.	II
11 Hope Street; 53.14375°N 2.36392°W		Early 19th century	A stuccoed house with a slated roof. It is in two storeys, and has a symmetrical three-bay front, the central bay protruding forward under a gable. The doorway has pilasters, an elliptical fanlight containing tracery, and an open pediment. The windows are sashes.	II
9 and 11 Market Square; 53.14376°N 2.36204°W		Early 19th century	A pair of brick shops with tiled roofs in two storeys. In the lower storey are Victorian shop fronts and doorways with semicircular heads and radial fanlights. In the upper storey are sash windows.	II
19 Market Square; 53.14409°N 2.36193°W		Early 19th century	A brick house with a slate roof in two storeys. The end facing the square is convex and contains a tripartite sash window on each floor and a doorway with pilasters, a pediment, and a radial fanlight. On the right side are more sash windows, and a similar doorway.	II
15–21 Middlewich Road; 53.14477°N 2.36662°W	—	Early 19th century	A terrace of four cottages in painted brick and with two storeys. The doorways are simple, and the windows are sashes, other than an early 19th-century shop window in No. 15.	II
Outbuildings, Brickhouse Farm No. 2; 53.15370°N 2.34213°W	—	Early 19th century	The outbuildings are in brick with tiled roofs. They are in two storeys, and are arranged around three sides of the farmyard. The buildings contain a variety of doorways and openings.	II
Sandbach Bridge; 53.14256°N 2.35868°W		Early 19th century	The bridge carries High Street over Arclid Brook. It is built in stone and consists of a single semicircular arch with a keystone and rusticated voussoirs. At the ends of the parapets are piers.	II
21–25 Crewe Road; 53.14386°N 2.36654°W		Early to mid-19th century	A row of three brick houses with a slate roof. They are in two storeys with sash windows. There are three doorways, two with pilasters, two with fanlights and cornice hoods carried on consoles, and one with a pediment. On the left side is a canted two-storey bay window.	II
5 and 7 Hightown; 53.14430°N 2.36449°W	—	Early to mid-19th century	Two brick shops in three storeys. In the ground floor are shop fronts, between which is a doorway with a semicircular head, a fanlight, and a keystone. To the left is a plain doorway with two blocked windows above. The windows are sashes.	II
Bridge No. 157; 53.13109°N 2.39127°W		Early to mid-19th century	An accommodation bridge over the Trent and Mersey Canal, it is built in brick with a stone coping. The bridge consists of a single span with a humped back and an elliptical arch, and has wings ending in piers.	II
Elm Tree House; 53.15217°N 2.39522°W	—	Early to mid-19th century	A brick farmhouse with a slate roof. It is in two storeys, and has a gabled wooden porch. The windows are casements.	II
Outbuildings, Elm Tree House; 53.15258°N 2.39540°W	—	Early to mid-19th century	The outbuildings are in brick with slate roofs. There is a two-storey central block with a slightly projecting single-storey bay on the right. To the left is a long single-storey wing. The doorways and openings have segmental heads.	II
Hope Chapel; 53.14388°N 2.36415°W		1836	Built as an Independent chapel, it is in red brick with stone dressings. The entrance front is pedimented and contains a central doorway with a stuccoed surround, an entablature containing a cornice, and a semicircular fanlight. In the gable is a datestone. Flanking the doorway are round-headed lancet windows. There are three similar windows along the street and a doorway with an elliptical tympanum.	II
92 Heath Road; 53.14308°N 2.34677°W	—	c. 1840	A brick house with a tiled roof in three storeys. It has a symmetrical entrance front of three bays, and a single-bay extension at the rear giving the house an L-shaped plan. On the front is a gabled porch with shaped bargeboards carried on four Doric columns, and the doorcase has fluted columns. The windows are sashes, and at the rear is a long staircase window.	II
Coach house, Oakley House; 53.14017°N 2.35030°W	—	c. 1840	The coach house is built in red brick, and is joined to the house by a high wall containing an arched opening. It is in two storeys, with a gable facing the road, and contains a casement windows and a pitch hole.	II
Grammar School Lodge; 53.14316°N 2.36787°W		1849–50	The lodge is at the entrance to Sandbach School. It was designed by George Gilbert Scott in Gothic Revival style. It is in red brick with blue brick diapering and has stone dressings and tiled roofs. The lodge is in a single storey and has an L-shaped plan. Its features include stone-coped gables, and mullioned windows under pointed arches.	II
Grammar School; 53.14290°N 2.37075°W		1849–51	The school was designed by George Gilbert Scott in Tudor Revival style. It is in red brick with blue brick diapering and has stone dressings and tiled roofs. The building is in one, two and three storeys, its features including gables and turrets. The doors and windows have Gothic-style heads. The school has subsequently been extended, and only the original main block is included in the listing.	II
Churchyard walls, gateways and railings, St Mary's Church; 53.14324°N 2.36153°W		c. 1850	The churchyard walls and gate piers are in stone, and the railings are in wrought iron. There are gateways in the north and south walls with wrought iron gates. The south gate piers support lamp standards.	II
57 and 59 High Street; 53.14294°N 2.36107°W		Mid-19th century	A pair of houses in red brick with blue brick diapering, stone dressings and slate roofs. They are in two storeys. The outer bays project forward under gables, and there is another, smaller projecting gabled bay to the left of centre. Each house has a gabled porch containing a doorway with a pointed head. The windows are casements. The forecourt is enclosed by a brick wall with stone coping.	II
Lock House; 53.12978°N 2.36741°W		Mid-19th century	A cottage for the lock keeper on the Trent and Mersey Canal adjacent to lock no. 66. It is in brick with a slate roof, it has two storeys and a two-bay front. In the centre is a projecting brick porch with a gabled roof and bargeboards. The windows are casements.	II
New Field Terrace; 53.14809°N 2.36143°W		1850–51	A terrace of seven brick houses with tiled roofs. Between the fourth and fifth house is an archway passing through the building. Above the arch is a tall casement window, over which is a gable. Most of the other windows are sashes. The doorways have rectangular fanlights and keystones.	II
Trustee Savings Bank; 53.14450°N 2.36446°W		1854	A building in Gothic Revival style, built in red brick with blue brick diapering, stone dressings, and a slate roof. It is in two storeys, and has two gables with crocketed pinnacles. Some windows are mullioned, others are mullioned and transomed, and there is one two-light oriel window, all with tracery in the heads. The entrance is Tudor arched with a cornice.	II
Literary Institute; 53.14457°N 2.36467°W		1857	The Literary Institute was designed by George Gilbert Scott in Gothic Revival style. It is in red brick with blue brick decoration and stone dressings, and has a tiled roof. The building is in two storeys, with a main block of three bays, each with an upper storey window rising into a dormer. To the left is an octagonal two-storey porch with a hipped roof, and to the right is a lower two-storey block.	II
2–20 Front Street; 53.14318°N 2.35993°W		1861	Two terraces, each of five cottages. They are in red brick with blue brick diapering, stone dressings, and tiled roofs. In the left range the central cottage projects forward under a gable, quoins, and the date in blue brick. The windows in the upper storey are casements projecting above the eaves and gabled; the ground floor windows are mixed. The right range has two slightly projecting cottages, and mainly modern windows.	II
St John's Church; 53.15074°N 2.33731°W		1861	The church was designed by George Gilbert Scott in Gothic Revival style. It is built in sandstone with Westmorland slate roofs. It has a cruciform plan, consisting of a nave, transepts, a chancel, and a central tower with a spire.	II
2–40 The Hill; 53.14230°N 2.35640°W		1865–67	Four blocks of almshouses designed by George Gilbert Scott in Gothic Revival style. They are in red brick with blue brick diapering, and have stone dressings and tiled roofs. Each block contains five houses with two storeys, each block has three gables containing dormers, and there are ground floor verandahs. The windows are casements.	II
Methodist Church and Sunday School; 53.14479°N 2.36602°W		c. 1870	The church was designed by Alfred Price, and is in red brick with stone dressings. The entrance front is symmetrical in three bays. The central bay has a pediment and a doorway with Doric pilasters. The windows have round heads, and in the gable is a demi-oculus. The sides are in two storeys, each with six round-headed windows. Behind the church is the Sunday school.	II
Town Hall and Market Hall; 53.14450°N 2.36340°W		1889	The building was designed by Thomas Bower in Gothic Revival style. It is in red brick with stone dressings and is expressed in two storeys. In the ground floor are four arches divided by buttresses, behind which are shops, and beyond these is the market hall. The upper storey contains three-light mullioned windows. To the right is a four-stage tower with a heraldic panel flanked by statues above the door, clock faces in the top stage, and a pyramidal roof with a cupola. On the left side is a gabled bay with mullioned and transomed windows.	II
Drinking fountain 53.14443°N 2.36488°W		1897	The fountain, in the centre of a roundabout, was designed by Thomas Bower. It is in stone and has a circular plan. In the centre is a basin surrounded by four stoups and eight Tuscan pillars supporting a canopy with a triglyph frieze. Around the canopy are shaped gablets, and at the top is a pinnacle with a ball finial.	II
Elworth War Memorial; 53.15098°N 2.39208°W		1921	The war memorial stands in an enclosure overlooking a road junction, it is in Portland stone, and consists of a statue of a soldier in battledress standing and holding a rifle. The stature stands on a square pilastered column with a podium, on a low square step, on an octagonal base in York stone. On the front of the podium is an inscription and the names of those lost in the First World War, and on the back are the names of those lost in the Second World War. The area is enclosed by low brown brick walls with sandstone coping, low piers at the entrance, and taller piers at the corners.	II
Brunner Mond Works War Memorial; 53.14062°N 2.35598°W		1921	The war memorial was originally attached to the Sandbach Works of Brunner Mond, and when this was demolished in 1934, it was removed to its present site in Sandbach Cemetery and set in a red sandstone pylon. The original panel, designed by Darcy Braddall, is in limestone and is in Renaissance style. The panel carries an inscription and the names of the workers lost in the First World War. This is flanked by pilasters, at the top is a cornice and a semicircular pediment flanked by flaming bronze torches. The pylon is about 12 feet (3.7 m) high, and has a stepped top with a pyramidal cap, and an inscribed bronze plaque at the base.	II
Sandbach War memorial 53.14375°N 2.36241°W		1922	The war memorial was designed by Clegg and Sons. It is in stone, and consists of an octagonal obelisk surmounted by a short spire. The obelisk stands on four steps, and is decorated in Gothic style, with blind traceried panels and arcades.	II
Telephone kiosk 53.14457°N 2.36357°W		1935	A K6 type telephone kiosk, designed by Giles Gilbert Scott. Constructed in cast iron with a square plan and a dome, it has three unperforated crowns in the top panels.	II

== See also ==
- Listed buildings in Bradwall
- Listed buildings in Brereton
- Listed buildings in Betchton
- Listed buildings in Hassall
- Listed buildings in Haslington
- Listed buildings in Moston
