= Sandbach Literary Institute =

Commercial building in Sandbach, Cheshire, England

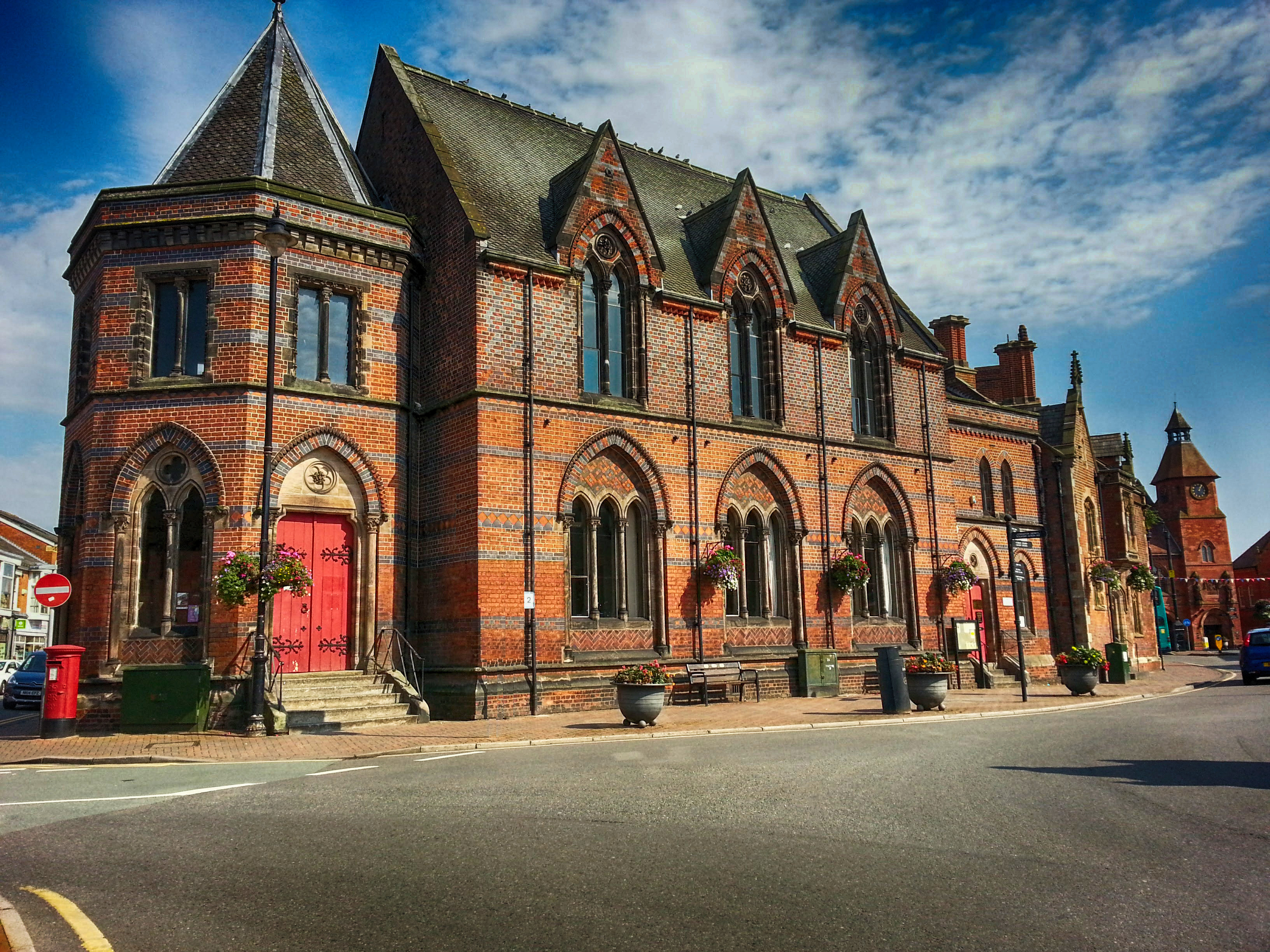
- Sandbach Literary Institute

- Shown in Cheshire
- 53.1446°N 2.3647°W
- Location: Hightown, Sandbach

History
- Built: 1857

Site notes
- Architect: Sir George Gilbert Scott
- Architectural style: Gothic Revival style

Listed Building – Grade II
- Official name: The Literary Institute
- Designated: 3 June 1976
- Reference no.: 1130351

The Sandbach Literary Institute, also known as Sandbach Literary Institution, is a commercial building in Hightown in Sandbach, Cheshire, England. The structure, which is currently used as a community events venue, is a Grade II listed building.

== History ==
The building was commissioned with the objective of "improving the conditions of life for the inhabitants" and was financed by public subscription. It was designed by Sir George Gilbert Scott in the Gothic Revival style, built by Samuel Faram of Wheelock in red brick with blue brick decoration at a cost of £2,700 and was completed in 1857. It was opened with a concert performed by amateur musicians.

The design involved an asymmetrical main frontage of six bays facing onto Hightown. The left-hand bay was formed by a two-stage octagonal tower with an arched doorway in the first stage and a bipartite window in the second stage, all surmounted by a hipped roof. The central block of three bays, which was slightly projected forward, was fenestrated by tripartite cusped windows within recessed arches on the ground floor and by bipartite cusped windows reaching up into the gables on the first floor. The right-hand section of two bays contained another arched doorway and was fenestrated by lancet windows on both floors. Internally, the principal rooms were a corn exchange and some reading rooms on the ground floor and a "long room" which was used for public events on the first floor.

The building was also used for public events: speakers included the campaigner for women's suffrage, Elizabeth Wolstenholme and her partner, Benjamin Elmy, in November 1872. The use of the building as a corn exchange declined significantly in the wake of the Great Depression of British Agriculture in the late 19th century. After the First World War a roll of honour was mounted on a wall in the building to commemorate the lives of local service personnel who had died during the war.

In 2005, the building became the offices and meeting place of Sandbach Town Council, but, in October 2020, the council decided to move its meetings to Sandbach Town Hall.

== See also ==
- Corn exchanges in England
- Listed buildings in Sandbach
