= Christ Church, Wheelock =

Coordinates: 53.1248°N 2.3765°W

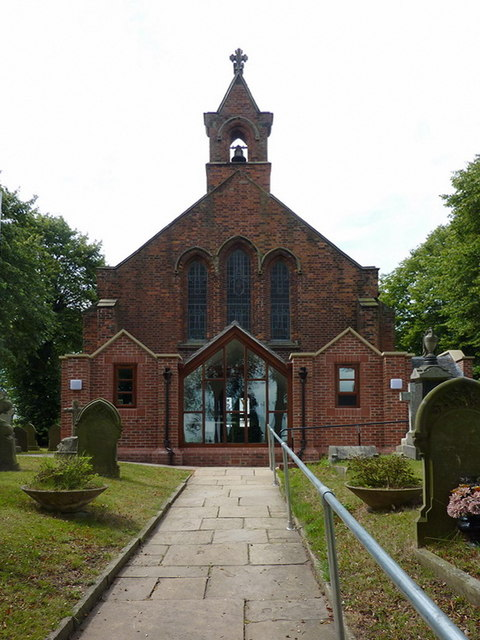

- Location in Cheshire
- Location: Wheelock, Cheshire
- Country: England
- Denomination: Anglican
- Website: Christ Church, Wheelock

History
- Status: Parish church

Architecture
- Functional status: Active
- Architect: Alfred Price (chancel 1903)
- Architectural type: Church
- Style: Gothic Revival
- Groundbreaking: 1836
- Completed: 1902

Specifications
- Materials: Brick

Administration
- Province: York
- Diocese: Chester
- Archdeaconry: Macclesfield
- Deanery: Congleton
- Parish: Wheelock

Clergy
- Vicar: Vacant

Christ Church is in Crewe Road, Wheelock, Cheshire, England. It is an active Anglican parish church in the deanery of Congleton, the archdeaconry of Macclesfield, and the diocese of Chester. Its benefice is united with those of St John the Evangelist, Sandbach Heath, and St Philip, Hassall Green.

== History ==
The nave of the church was built in 1836 as a chapel of ease. It was dedicated to Christ in 1843 by the Bishop of Chester. The chancel was added in 1903, the architect being Alfred Price.

== Architecture ==
The church is constructed in brick. Its windows are lancets, with a triple lancet at the west end. Also at the west end is a gabled bellcote.

== External features ==
In the church yard is a stone war memorial dating from about 1920 with a soldier in battledress.
