= Hassall Green railway station =

Former railway station in Cheshire, England

Hassall Green
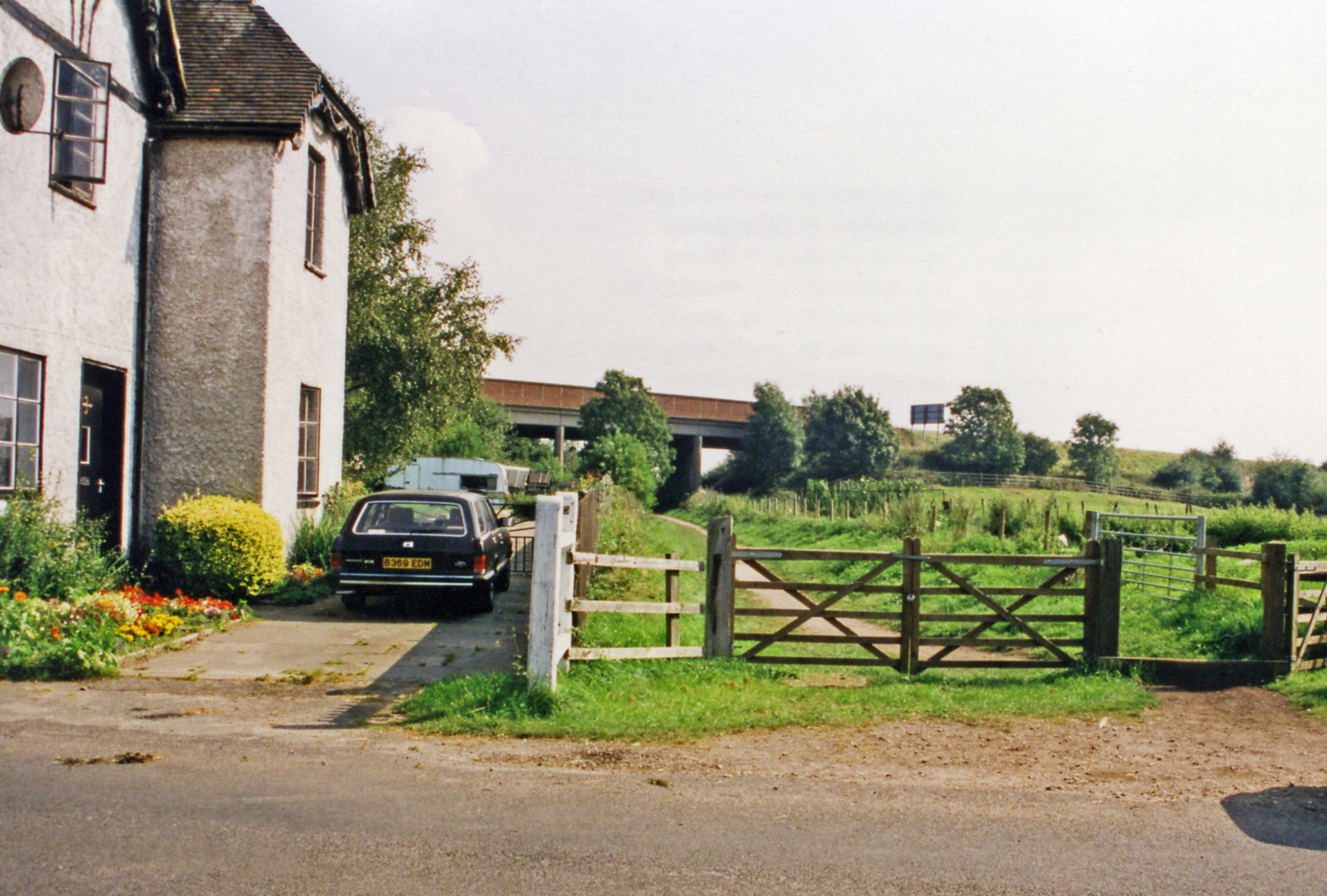
- The station site photographed in 1999, looking towards Lawton

General information
- Location: Hassall Green and Hassall, Cheshire East; England
- Coordinates: 53.1206°N 2.3364°W
- Grid reference: SJ775582
- Platforms: 2

Other information
- Status: Disused

History
- Original company: North Staffordshire Railway
- Post-grouping: London, Midland & Scottish Railway

Key dates
- 17 April 1905: Opened
- 28 July 1930: Closed for passengers
- 1 November 1947: closed to Goods
Location

Hassall Green railway station is a disused railway station in Hassall Green and Hassall in Cheshire, England.

== History ==
The station was situated on the North Staffordshire Railway (NSR) branch line to Sandbach from Harecastle. The line opened in 1852 to serve the salt and chemical works in the Sandbach area and passenger services were a very late addition, not being introduced until 1893, 41 years after the opening of the line.

The station at Hassall Green was a later addition to the passenger service. Two intermediate stations on the line, Wheelock & Sandbach and Lawton opened in 1893 but Hassall Green was only opened in 1905. The station marked the end point of a single track section from Lawton and towards Sandbach the line was double track.

== Decline and closure ==
Increasing competition from bus services led to the station and line being closed for passenger services on 28 July 1930. Parcels traffic continued to be handled at the station until 1947 when the station closed completely.

Freight traffic continued over the line until 1964 and the line was finally closed and lifted in 1971.

== Legacy ==
The signalbox and crossing gates are preserved and have since been relocated to Hadlow Road railway station in Willaston, Wirral, formally part of the Hooton and West Kirby branch line.

Preceding station	Disused railways	Following station
Lawton; Line & station closed	North Staffordshire Railway; Sandbach branch line	Wheelock & Sandbach; Line & station closed
