= Hassall Green =

Village in Cheshire, England

Coordinates: 53.123191°N 2.337671°W

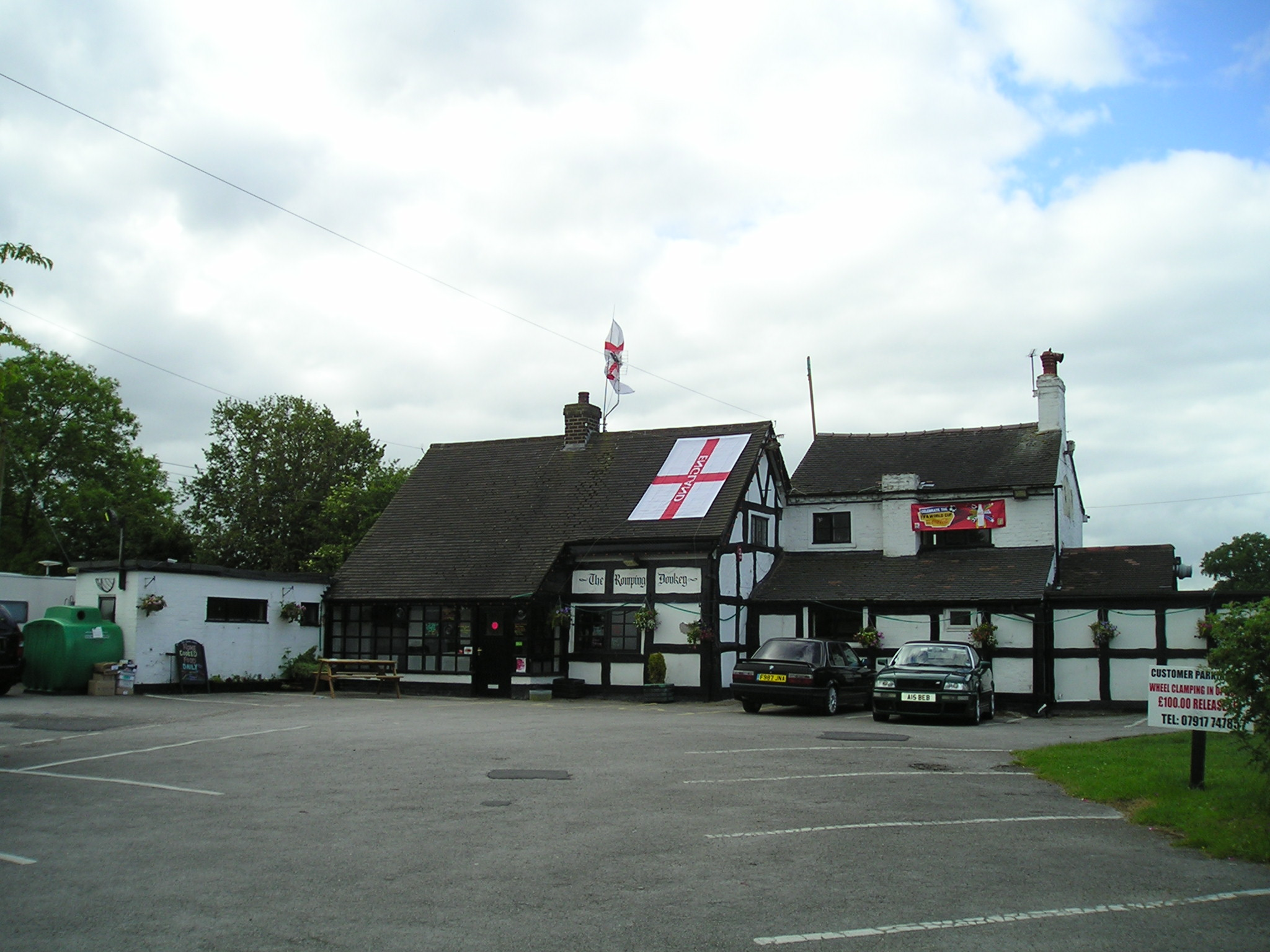
- The Romping Donkey pub (now closed) in Hassall Green

- Location within Cheshire
- OS grid reference: SJ775585
- Civil parish: Betchton
- Unitary authority: Cheshire East
- Ceremonial county: Cheshire
- Region: North West
- Country: England
- Sovereign state: United Kingdom
- Post town: SANDBACH
- Postcode district: CW11
- Dialling code: 01270
- Police: Cheshire
- Fire: Cheshire
- Ambulance: North West
- UK Parliament: Congleton

Hassall Green is a village in the civil parish of Betchton in the unitary authority of Cheshire East and the ceremonial county of Cheshire, England.

The village formerly had a railway station on the North Staffordshire Railway (NSR) branch line to Sandbach from Harecastle, and is also on the Trent & Mersey Canal.

The Romping Donkey public house in the village closed in 2010 and is now a private house. It is a Grade II listed building.

St Philip's Church is a tin tabernacle church that originally stood on the site of St Mary Magdalene's Church in nearby Alsager. It was bought for £150 and re-erected in Hassall Green in 1895.

== Sources ==
- Quick, Michael (2009) [2001]. Railway passenger stations in Great Britain: a chronology (4th ed.). Oxford: Railway & Canal Historical Society. ISBN 978-0-901461-57-5. OCLC 612226077.
