= St Mary's Church, Sandbach =

Coordinates: 53.1436°N 2.3610°W

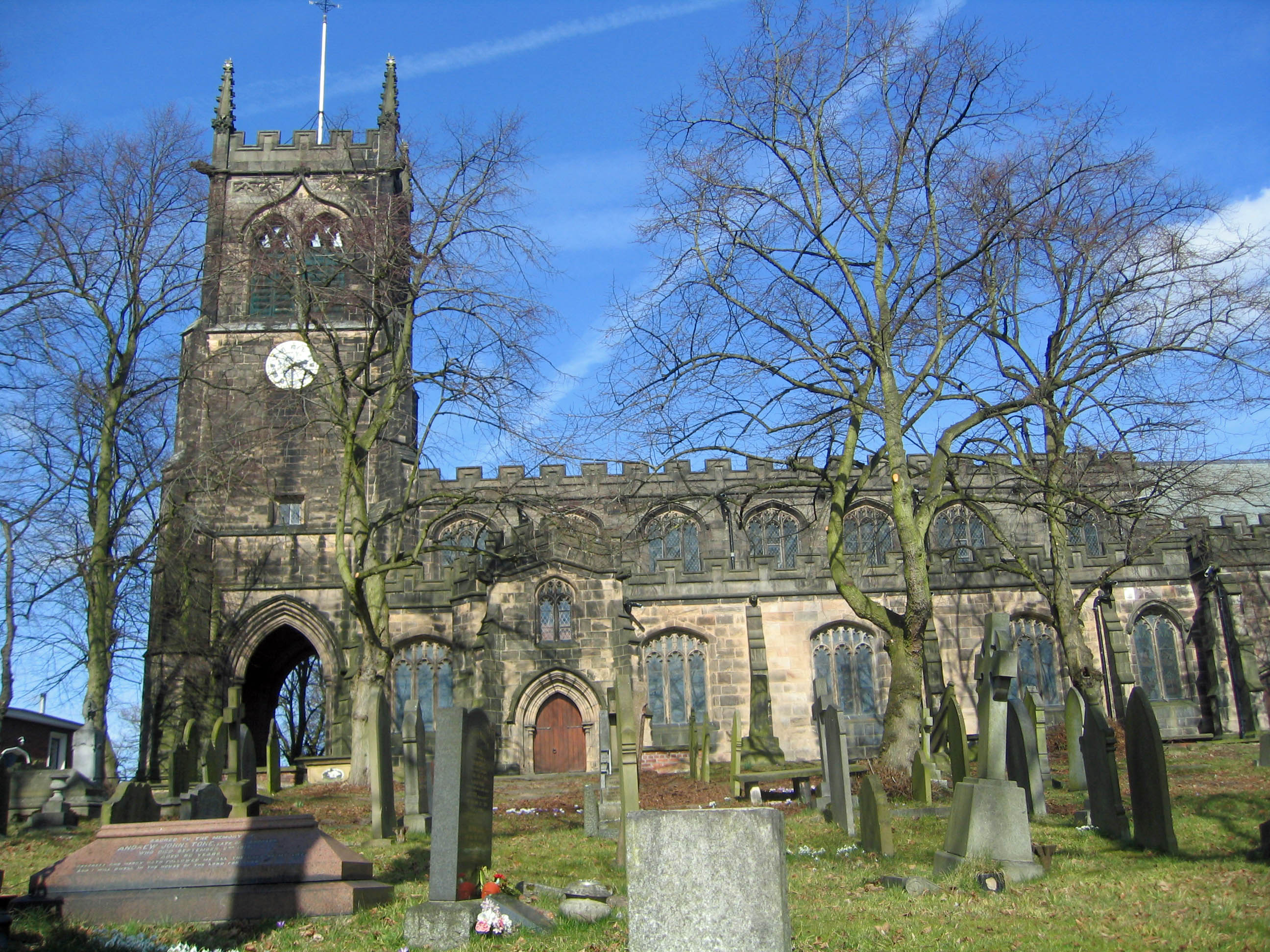
- St Mary's Church, Sandbach, from the south

- Location in Cheshire
- OS grid reference: SJ 759,608
- Location: Sandbach, Cheshire
- Country: England
- Denomination: Anglican
- Churchmanship: Central
- Website: St Mary's Church Sandbach

History
- Status: Parish church

Architecture
- Functional status: Active
- Heritage designation: Grade II*
- Designated: 11 August 1950
- Architects: Sir George Gilbert Scott; Austin and Paley
- Architectural type: Church
- Style: Gothic Revival
- Completed: 1930

Specifications
- Capacity: 400
- Materials: Red sandstone

Administration
- Province: York
- Diocese: Chester
- Archdeaconry: Macclesfield
- Deanery: Congleton
- Parish: Sandbach

Clergy
- Vicar: Revd Bee Boyde

St Mary's Church is in the town of Sandbach, Cheshire, England. The church is recorded in the National Heritage List for England as a designated Grade II* listed building. It is an active Anglican parish church in the diocese of Chester, the archdeaconry of Macclesfield and the deanery of Congleton.

== History ==
The Domesday Book (c. 1086) records the presence of a priest and a church on the site of the present church, and it is shown on an 1840 map of the town centre of Sandbach. This was replaced by another church erected about the time of Henry VII. This church was built in sandstone which became badly weathered. The present church dates largely from the considerable degree of rebuilding by Sir George Gilbert Scott in 1847–49. Much of the existing fabric was replaced and the remaining fabric was encased in new stone. The east end of the church was extended by some 40 feet (12 m) and the tower was rebuilt as a copy of the former tower. The builders were Cooper and Son of Derby. The stone, which came from quarries in the Mow Cop area, was given by Sir Philip Grey Egerton MP. Part of the west end had to be repaired in 1894–95 following a fire. In 1930 Austin and Paley added a choir vestry, and a north porch, at a cost of £1,331. The parish registers date from 1562 and are complete. The churchwardens' accounts prior to 1888 are lost.

== Architecture ==
=== Exterior ===
The plan of the church consists of a clerestoried nave and a choir of five bays, with aisles, side chapels, and a tower at the west end. The choir vestry projects from the northwest. The tower is unusual in that it stands on three open arches through which passes a public footpath. The style is mainly Perpendicular and some medieval masonry is still present in the arcades.

=== Interior ===
The font dates from 1859; it is made of Caen stone and was constructed by Thomas Stringer. It has a Greek palindrome inscription, which reads "NIYON ANOMHMA MH MONAN OYINE". This translated means "Wash my sin not my countenance only". The old octagonal font dated 1669 and decorated with acanthus leaves, was returned to the church in 1938. Scott arranged the memorials around the walls of the aisles. One of these is a marble relief to the memory of Rev. John Armistead, who was vicar from 1828 to 1865. It was designed by George Frederic Watts and sculpted by George Nelson in 1876. Another is to John Ford, who died in 1839, which includes a life-size allegorical female figure by an altar. The roofs are dated 1661. The roof over the north aisle includes a large coat of arms in a wreath. In the chapels and chancels is stained glass by William Wailes, and in the north aisle is a window by Kempe.

=== Bells ===
There is a ring of eight bells. Four of the bells were cast by Abraham II Rudhall in 1719, and a bell dated 1782 is attributed to Thomas Rudhall. Three later bells by John Warner and Sons are dated 1857, 1858 and 1868.

== External features ==
The churchyard walls, gateways and railings to south-east and north of the church are listed at Grade II. The churchyard contains the war graves of 14 service personnel, 11 of World War I and three of World War II.

== Rectors, vicars and curates ==
=== Rectors c. 1100–1256 ===
- before 1128: Steinulf the Priest
- before 1153: Roger de Lech
- c. 1230: Thomas

=== Vicars c. 1300–1887 ===
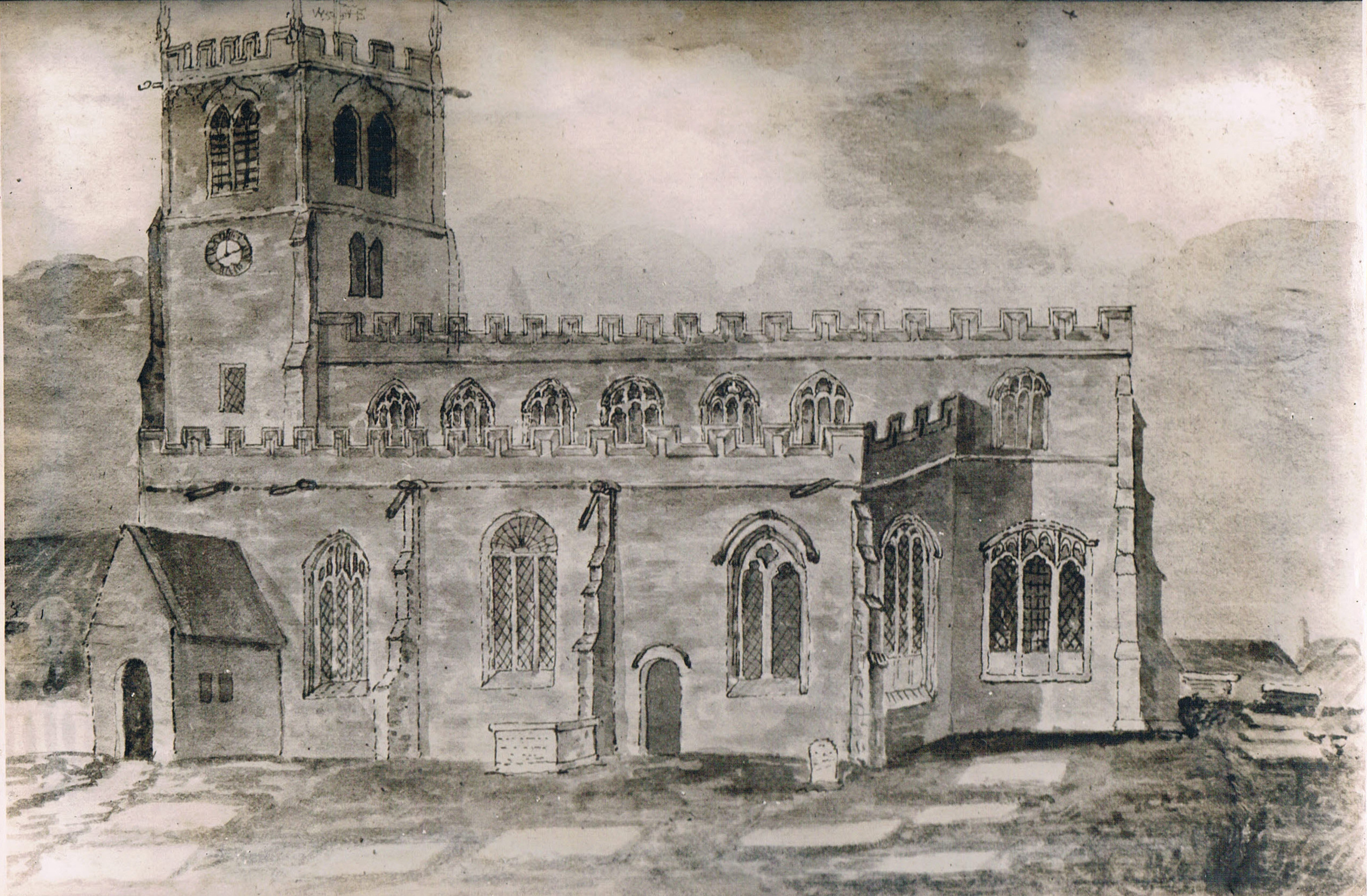
St Mary's Church, Sandbach. Before restoration. Engraving. c. 1800

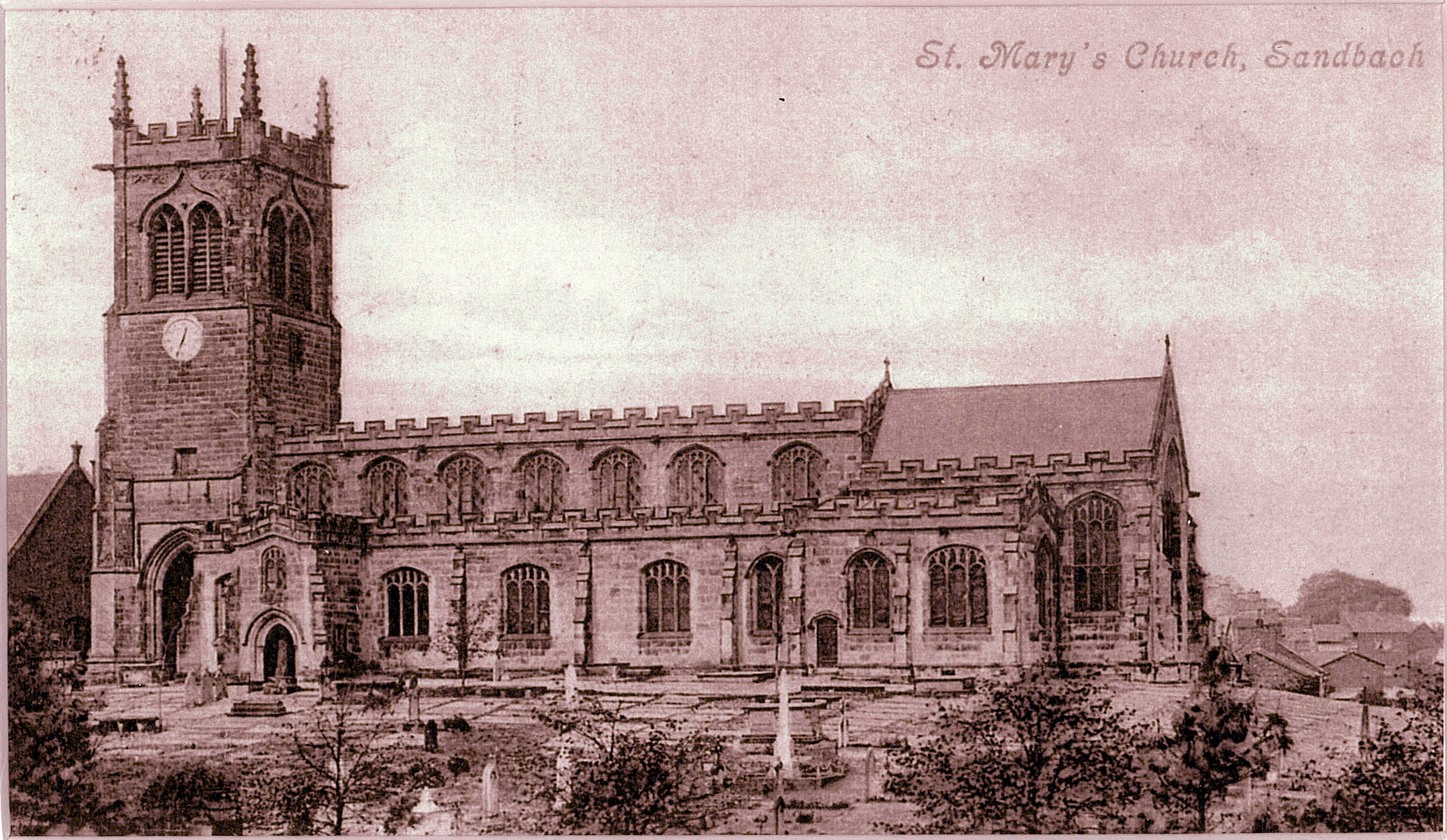
St Mary's Church, Sandbach. From a postcard. c. 1900

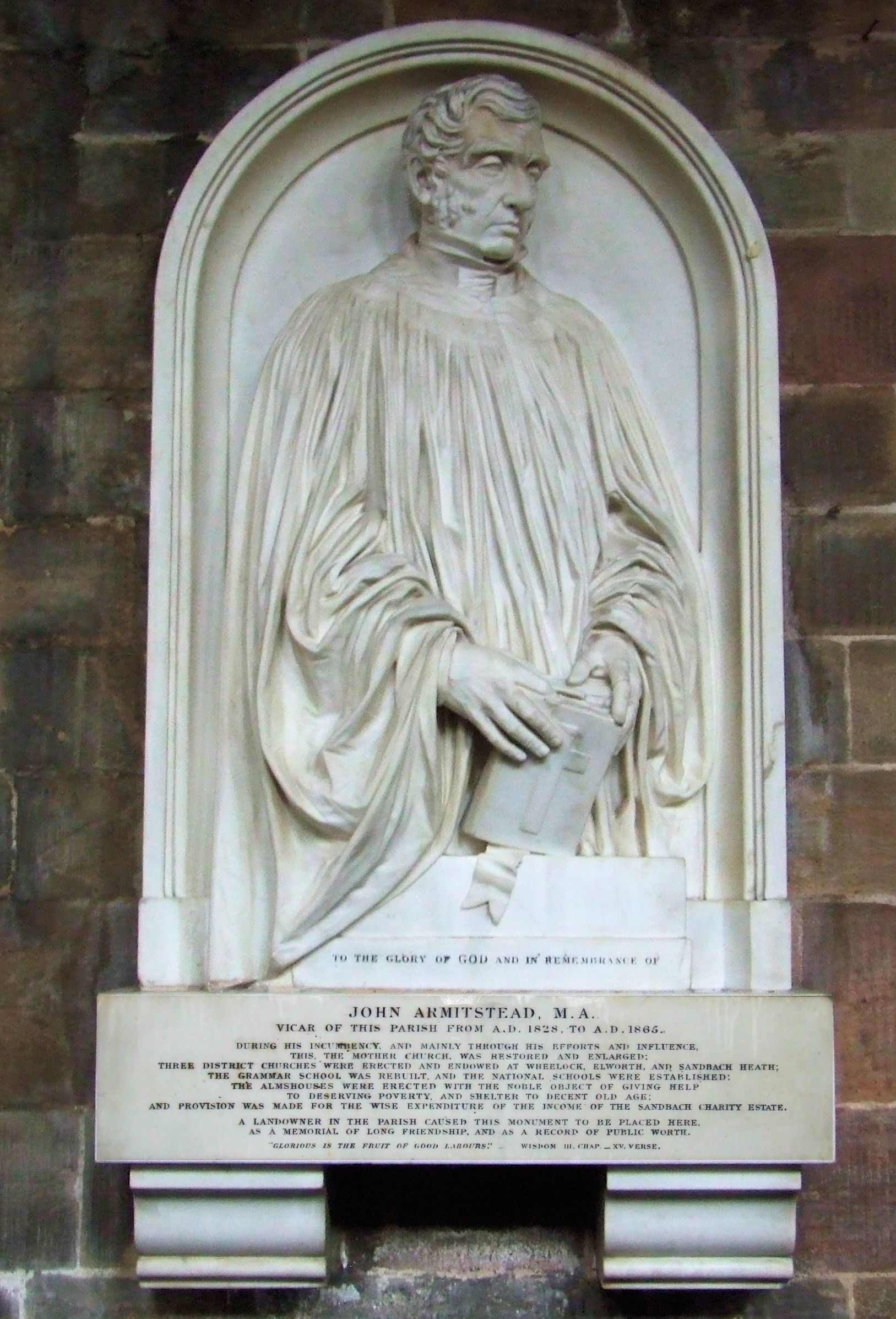
John Armitstead, Vicar of Sandbach 1828–1865 (1876 sculpture by George Frederic Watts inside St Mary's)

- Before 1327: Richard Burgillion (d. 1327)
- 7 April 1327: Philip de Goodrich Castle (de Castro Godrici)
- 15 January 1344: William de Mere
- 23 June 1348: Thomas Chaumpain
- 7 September 1349: William de Upton (alias Welton)
- 15 October 1349: John de Tydrynton
- 7 March 1371: Randle del Ford
- 18 October 1401: Thomas de Hassall
- 21 September 1418: Thomas Hassall
- 7 May 1455: James Whiteacres
- September 1465: Randle Penketh
- 7 March 1481: Roger Clifton
- c. 1517: Hugh Brereton
- 15 September 1535: Thomas Smyth
- 27 September 1548: Richard Smyth
- 19 May 1554: Peter Prestland
- 1565: Richard Smyth
- 23 May 1576: John Shaw
- 1616: Laurence Wood
- 16 November 1630: Thomas Tudman
- 1644: Joseph Cope (1622–1704)
- c. 1662: Thomas Tudman
- 15 May 1674: William Hayes
- 19 Mar 1695[6]: Thomas Welles, M.A.
- 13 May 1729: Hugh Mee, M.A.
- 13 April 1733: Samuel Allon, B.A.
- 25 September 1736: Blayney Baldwyn, M.A.
- 13 May 1739: Henry Baldwyn, M.A.
- 21 April 1773: Peter Haddon, M.A.
- 13 January 1787: Richard Lowndes Salmon, M.A.
- 20 February 1828: John Armitstead, M.A.
- 20 October 1865: John Richard Armitstead, M.A.
- 1919: John Hornby Armitstead, M.A.
- 1941: Reginald Norton Betts, M.A.
- 1964: Geoffrey Thomas Wykes, B.A.
- 1972: John Basil Rigby (d. 2001)
- 9 September 1983: David W.G. Stocker, B.A.
- 2001: Rex Buckley
- 2008: Thomas Shepherd, B.A.
- 2020: Bee Boyde

=== Curates ===
- 1548: Ricardus Rudiarte
- 1565: Johannes Shawe
- 13 January 1573: unknown
- 20 May 1701: Galfridus Williams
- 1708: Gulielmus Repton
- 21 June – 7 July 1725, Ranulphus Hazlehurst
- 5 June 1733: Joseph Twemlowe
- 19 December 1737 – 13 July 1742: William Dickens
- 10 June 1745 – 6 August 1754: George Penlington
- 1 June 1760: John Sibson

== See also ==
- Grade II* listed buildings in Cheshire East
- Listed buildings in Sandbach

== Sources ==
- "Parish (Church): Sandbach". The Clergy of the Church of England Database 1540–1835. CCEd Location ID 5130.
