= St Philip's Church, Hassall Green =

Coordinates: 53.1208°N 2.3336°W

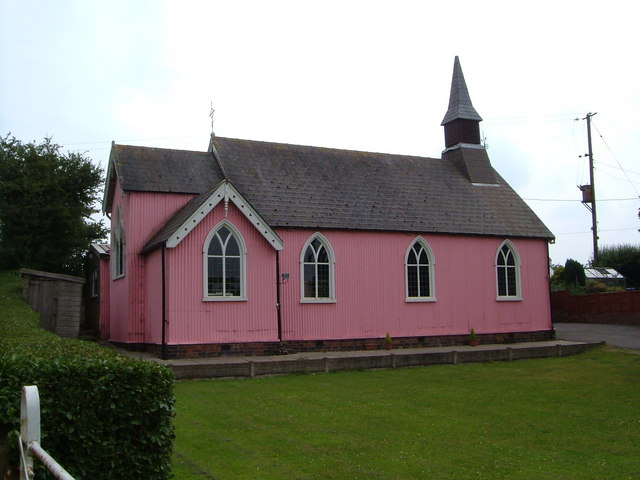
- St Philip's Church, Hassall Green, from the north

- Location in Cheshire
- Location: New Inn Lane, Hassall Green, Cheshire
- Country: England
- Denomination: Anglican
- Website: St Philip, Hassall Green

History
- Dedication: Saint Philip

Architecture
- Functional status: Active
- Architectural type: Tin tabernacle

Specifications
- Materials: Corrugated galvanised iron

Administration
- Province: York
- Diocese: Chester
- Archdeaconry: Macclesfield
- Deanery: Congleton
- Parish: Wheelock

Clergy
- Vicar: Vacant

St Philip's Church is in New Inn Lane, Hassall Green, Cheshire, England. It is an active Anglican church in the parish of Wheelock, the benefice of Sandbach Heath with Wheelock, the deanery of Congleton, the archdeaconry of Macclesfield, and the diocese of Chester. The other churches in the benefice are St John the Evangelist, Sandbach Heath, and Christ Church, Wheelock. Being a prefabricated building constructed in corrugated galvanised iron, it is popularly referred to as a tin tabernacle.

== History ==
The building originally stood in Crewe Road, Alsager, where it was erected in the early 1880s. In 1894 the construction of the permanent Church of St Mary Magdalene started. The tin tabernacle was sold for £150 (equivalent to £17,000 in 2025), and moved to Hassall Green the following year.

== Architecture ==
The church is painted pink with white bargeboards. The authors of the Buildings of England series describe it as a "candyfloss-pink tin tabernacle". Its plan consists of a three-bay nave, a short chancel at a lower level, and a north vestry. Along the sides of the church are windows containing Y-tracery, and the east window in the chancel consists of stepped lancets. On the west gable is a bellcote surmounted by a slated broach spire.
