= St John the Evangelist's Church, Sandbach Heath =

Coordinates: 53.1507°N 2.3374°W

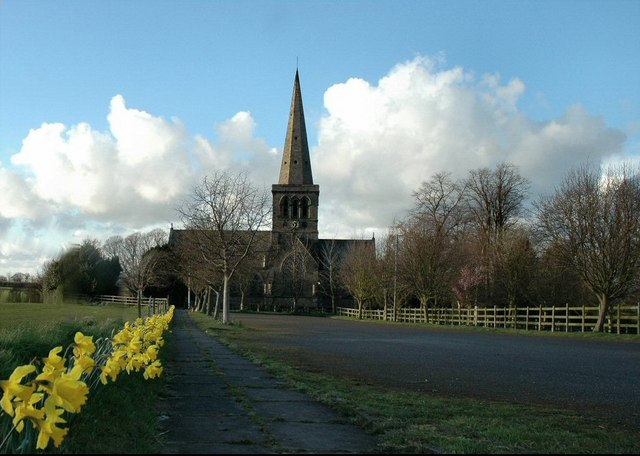
- St John the Evangelist's Church, Sandbach Heath, from the south

- Location in Cheshire
- OS grid reference: SJ 775 616
- Location: Sandbach Heath, Sandbach, Cheshire
- Country: England
- Denomination: Anglican
- Website: St John the Evangelist, Sandbach Heath

History
- Status: Parish church
- Dedication: Saint John the Evangelist

Architecture
- Functional status: Active
- Heritage designation: Grade II
- Designated: 3 June 1976
- Architect: George Gilbert Scott
- Architectural type: Church
- Style: Gothic Revival
- Completed: 1861

Specifications
- Materials: Stone, slate roofs

Administration
- Province: York
- Diocese: Chester
- Archdeaconry: Macclesfield
- Deanery: Congleton
- Parish: St John the Evangelist, Sandbach Heath

Clergy
- Vicar: Vacant

St John the Evangelist's Church is in Sandbach Heath, about 1 mile (1.6 km) northeast of Sandbach, Cheshire, England. It is an active Anglican parish church in the deanery of Congleton, the archdeaconry of Macclesfield, and the diocese of Chester. Its benefice is united with those of Christ Church, Wheelock, and St Philip, Hassall Green. The church is recorded in the National Heritage List for England as a designated Grade II listed building.

== History ==
St John's was built in 1861 and designed by George Gilbert Scott following a bequest of £5,000 (equivalent to £510,000 in 2025).

== Architecture ==
The church is constructed in yellow stone from Mow Cop with red sandstone dressings, and has Westmorland slate roofs. Its plan is cruciform, consisting of a nave, north and south transepts, a chancel, and a central tower with a spire. The windows contain plate tracery. The interior walls are faced with ashlar, and the capitals are richly carved with foliage. The woodwork in the chancel, including the reredos, was carved by Jessie H. Kennerley. The windows at the east and west ends contain stained glass by Clayton and Bell dating from about 1863. The two-manual pipe organ was built in 1864 by W. Sweetland of Bath.

== External features ==
The churchyard contains the war grave of a Cheshire Regiment soldier of World War I.

== See also ==
- List of new churches by George Gilbert Scott in Northern England
- Listed buildings in Sandbach
