= Wheelock & Sandbach railway station =

Former railway station in Cheshire, England

Coordinates: 53.133°N 2.375°W

Wheelock & Sandbach
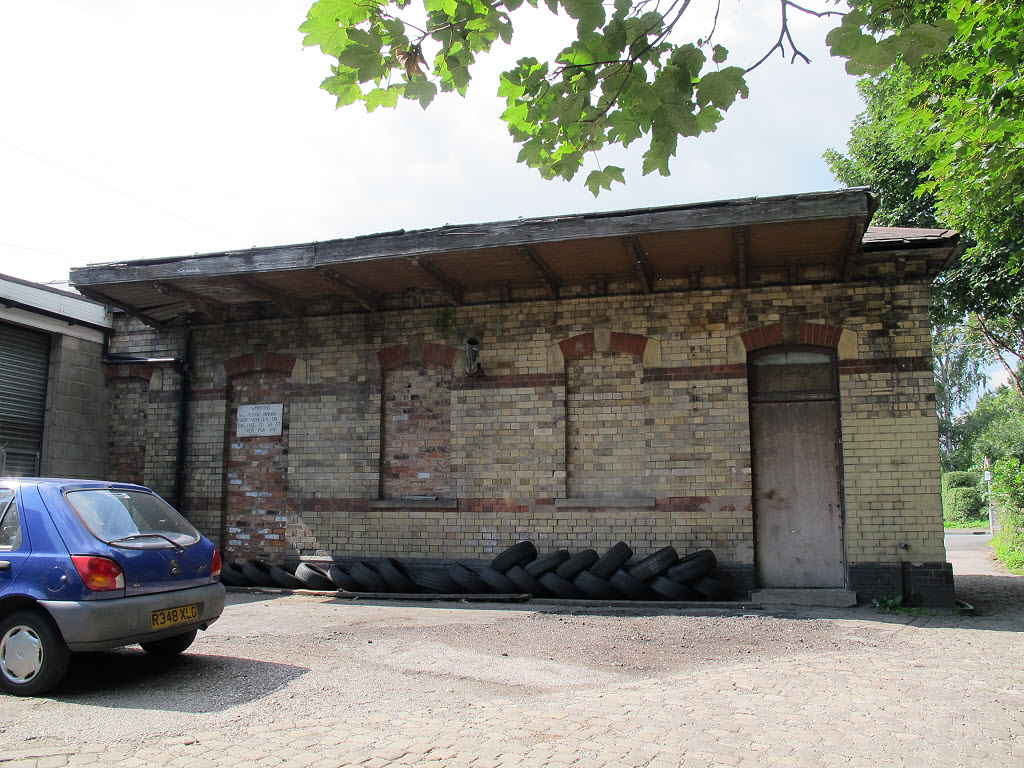
- Rear of the station ticket office in 2013

General information
- Location: Wheelock and Sandbach, Cheshire East; England
- Grid reference: SJ750595
- Platforms: 2

Other information
- Status: Disused

History
- Original company: North Staffordshire Railway
- Post-grouping: London, Midland and Scottish Railway

Key dates
- 3 July 1893: Opened as Sandbach (Wheelock)
- 2 April 1923: Renamed Wheelock & Sandbach
- 28 July 1930: Closed
Location

Wheelock & Sandbach railway station served the village of Wheelock and market town of Sandbach, in Cheshire, England, between 1893 and 1930. It was built by the North Staffordshire Railway (NSR).

== History ==
The NSR was conceived originally as a line between Stoke-upon-Trent and Liverpool, an idea abandoned as part of an agreement with the Grand Junction Railway in 1845. The short (6.5 miles (10.5 km)) line from Lawton Junction to Ettiley Heath was opened as a goods traffic only line in 1852. Subsequently, the line was extended to join with the London and North Western Railway at Sandbach in 1866. Towards the end of the 19th century, the NSR decided to introduce a passenger service on the line and Sandbach (Wheelock) railway station was opened in July 1893, as the terminus of the new service from Harecastle.

There were only three trains each way per day; extra services were provided on Thursday (market day in Sandbach) and Saturday, but there was no Sunday service. By August 1927, the passenger service had been reduced to services on Thursday and Saturday only; in June 1930, the London, Midland and Scottish Railway decided to withdraw the passenger service from 28 July 1930.

Preceding station	Disused railways	Following station
Hassall Green; Line & station closed	North Staffordshire Railway; Sandbach branch line	Sandbach; Line open, station open

== The site today ==
The station buildings still survive in use for a tyre-fitting business. The trackbed forms part of National Cycle Network route 5, which runs from Ettiley Heath towards Malkins Bank.
