= Lawton railway station =

Former railway station in Cheshire, England

Lawton

General information
- Location: Church Lawton, Cheshire East; England
- Coordinates: 53.0981°N 2.2872°W
- Grid reference: SJ808556
- Platforms: 2

Other information
- Status: Disused

History
- Original company: North Staffordshire Railway
- Post-grouping: London, Midland & Scottish Railway

Key dates
- 3 July 1893: Opened
- 4 May 1964: Closed to Goods
- 28 July 1930: Closed to Passengers
Location

Lawton railway station is a disused railway station in Church Lawton, Cheshire, England.

== History ==
The station was situated on the North Staffordshire Railway (NSR) branch line to Sandbach from Harecastle. The line opened in 1852 to serve the salt and chemical works in the Sandbach area and passenger services were a very late addition, not being introduced until 1893, 41 years after the opening of the line.

The station called Lawton, which was close to the settlement at Lawton Gate was one of two intermediate station on the line opened at the same time in July 1893, a third Hassall Green was opened in 1905. From the station to Lawton Junction, the junction with the Crewe-Harecastle line the line was double tracked, from Lawton to Hassall Green the line was only single track.

There were minimal goods facilities at the station and the station had an island platform with the buildings on the platform between the two running lines.

== Decline and closure ==
Increasing competition from bus services led to the line being closed for passenger services in 1930 and Lawton station closed completely on 28 July that year, with parcels traffic being dealt with at Alsager.

Freight traffic continued over the line until 1964 and the line was finally closed and lifted in 1971.

Preceding station	Disused railways	Following station
Harecastle; Line closed, station open	North Staffordshire Railway; Sandbach branch line	Hassall Green; Line & station closed
