= St Mary Magdalene's Church, Alsager =

Coordinates: 53.0961°N 2.3071°W

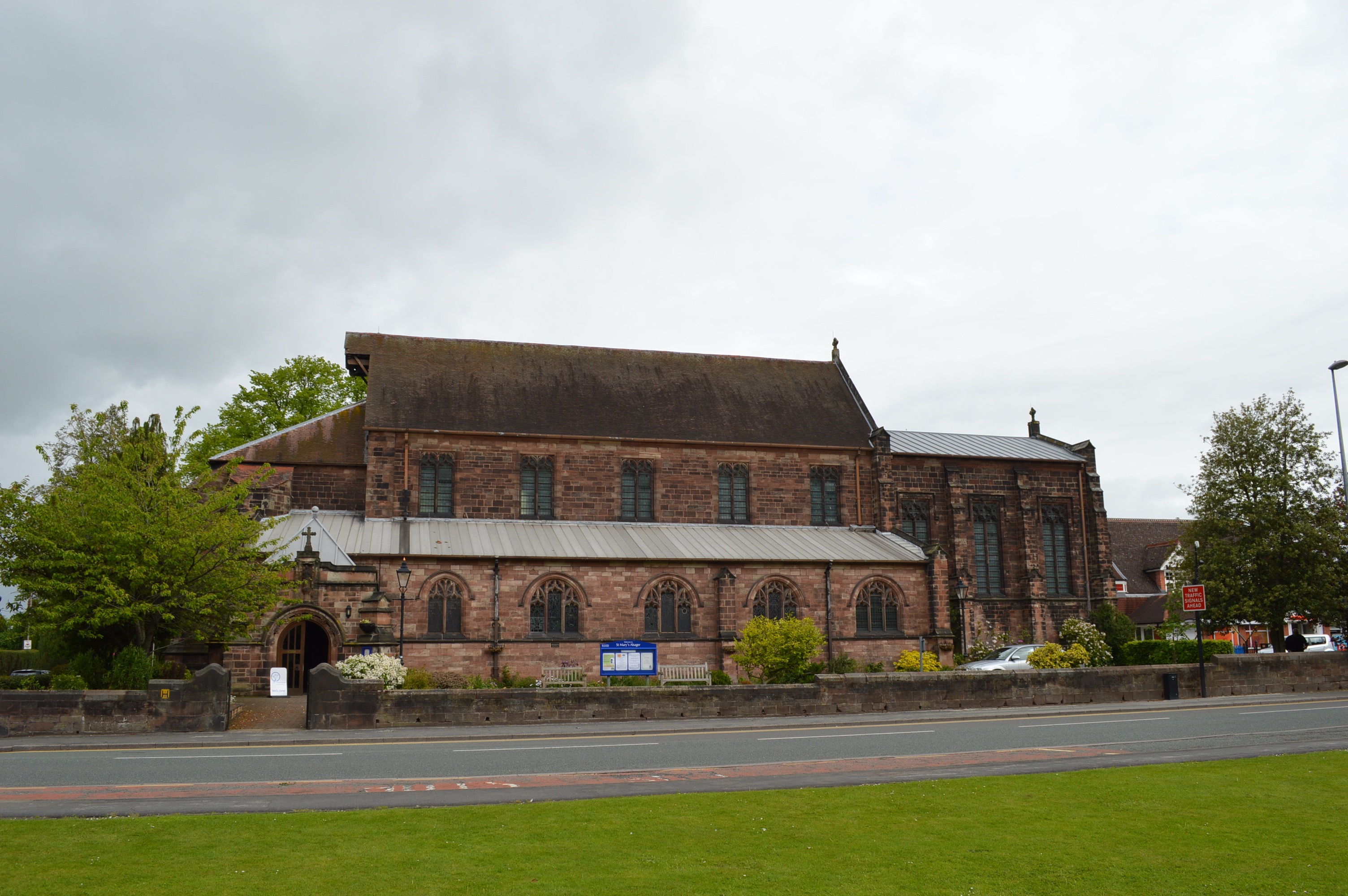
- Southern aspect (2015)

- Location in Cheshire
- OS grid reference: SJ 795,555
- Location: Crewe Road, Alsager, Cheshire
- Country: England
- Denomination: Anglican
- Website: St Mary, Alsager

History
- Status: Parish church
- Dedication: Mary Magdalene

Architecture
- Functional status: Active
- Heritage designation: Grade II
- Designated: 26 March 1987
- Architect: Hubert Austin
- Architectural type: Church
- Style: Gothic Revival
- Groundbreaking: 1894
- Completed: 1937

Specifications
- Materials: Sandstone, tiled roofs

Administration
- Province: York
- Diocese: Chester
- Archdeaconry: Macclesfield
- Deanery: Congleton
- Parish: St Mary Magdalene, Alsager

Clergy
- Vicar: Revd Michelle Goodrich

St Mary Magdalene's Church is in Crewe Road, Alsager, Cheshire, England. It is an active Anglican parish church in the deanery of Congleton, the archdeaconry of Macclesfield, and the diocese of Chester. Dedicated to Jesus' companion Mary Magdalene, it is recorded in the National Heritage List for England as a designated Grade II listed building.

== History ==
The church replaced a "tin tabernacle" that was sold for £150 and moved to Hassall Green, where it survives as St Philip's Church. The new building was constructed between 1894 and 1896 by the Lancaster firm of architects Austin and Paley, the church having been designed in 1884 by Hubert Austin. At this time only the east bay of the north aisle was built. The aisle was completed in 1936–37, at which time the architect was Henry Paley. It had been planned for the tower, which rises only to the height of the nave, to be higher and for a spire to be added, but this was never achieved.

== Architecture ==
=== Exterior ===
St Mary's is constructed in red sandstone with tiled roofs. Its plan consists of a nave with a clerestory, north and south aisles, a north and south porch, a chancel with an organ loft and vestry to the southeast, and a west tower. The tower has diagonal buttresses, and a semi-octagonal stair turret to the south. On its west side is a four-light window. On the south side of the church is a porch with a statue of Mary Magdalene above the doorway. To the right of this are five windows, one with two lights, the others with three lights, all containing Decorated-style tracery. Along the clerestory are five two-light windows. The windows on the north side of the church are similar, but those along the aisle all have three lights. On the south wall of the chancel are three two-light windows. The east window has six lights.

=== Interior ===
Between the nave and the aisle are five-bay arcades carried on elliptical piers. On the north side of the chancel is a two-bay arcade. In the south wall of the chancel are a sedilia and a piscina. The reredos and chancel screen date from 1926. The font is square with chamfered corners. The stained glass includes windows from the early 20th century designed by G. P. Hutchinson for Powells, a window by Karl Parsons dated 1926 depicting Saint Michael and Gabriel, and two windows by Heaton, Butler and Bayne dating from about 1915 and from about 1920. The three-manual organ was built in 1905 by Steele and Keay, with alterations by Rushworth and Dreaper in 1945, and by Ward and Shutt in 1978.

== See also ==
- Listed buildings in Alsager
- List of ecclesiastical works by Austin and Paley (1895–1914)
- List of ecclesiastical works by Austin and Paley (1916–44)
