= Sandbach Crosses =

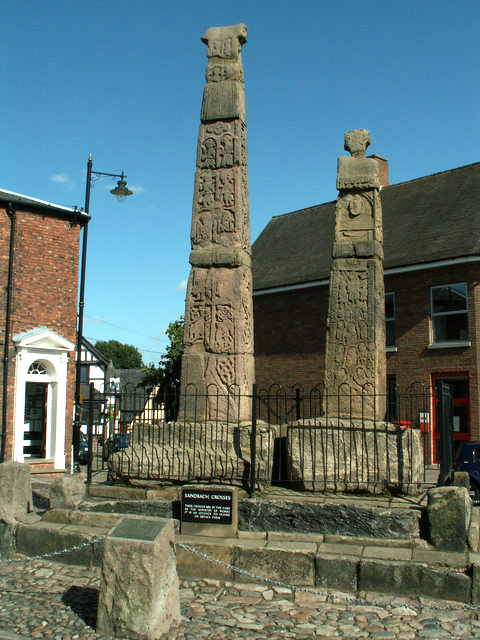
- Sandbach Crosses

- Location in Cheshire
- 53.14402°N 2.36209°W
- OS grid reference: SJ 759 608

Listed Building – Grade I
- Designated: 11 August 1950
- Reference no.: 1159937

Scheduled monument
- Designated: 30 November 1925
- Reference no.: 1011144

The Sandbach Crosses are two 9th-century stone Anglo-Saxon crosses now erected in the market place in the town of Sandbach, Cheshire, England. They are unusually large and elaborate examples of the type and are recorded in the National Heritage List for England as a designated Grade I listed building, and a scheduled monument.

== History ==
The most recent and authoritative dating places the larger cross from the early part of the 9th century, and the smaller from about the middle of that century. Older theories, now outdated, included the view that they were erected to commemorate the conversion to Christianity of Peada of Mercia about 653. Other sources date them to the 9th century. The original site of the crosses is unknown and it is believed that they were brought to Sandbach in the Middle Ages. The earliest documentary evidence is by William Smith, the Rouge-Dragon Pursuivant at Arms of Elizabeth I, who was from Nantwich. In 1585 he wrote 'two square crosses of stone, on steps, with certain images and writings thereon graven [standing] hard together. Either after the Reformation or during the Civil War they were thrown down and their parts were scattered over a wide area. Larger pieces of the crosses were found as far away as Oulton and Tarporley while smaller pieces were found on various sites in Sandbach. In the early 19th century they were collected together and in 1816 were reassembled and erected under the direction of George Ormerod, the Cheshire historian.

The crosses now consist of two upright columns set in sockets on a base of three stepped stones. The northern cross is the taller and has a mutilated head. The southern cross is truncated and has a mutilated head from a different cross. The crosses have always been a pair and were carved by the same hand. They depict religious scenes, doll-like heads and beasts in panels, together with vine-scrolls, course interlace patterns and some dragons.

== In art ==
One of the Crosses (before restoration in 1816) appears in a watercolour by William Alexander, from which they were engraved by John Byrne and published in Britannia Depicta, Part III, Buckinghamshire and Cheshire (1810). Examples were sold at Sotheby's on 22 February 1977, and now appear in the UK's Government Art Collection. Prints and engravings are also found at the Cheshire Records Office.

== In music ==
In 2011, Foden's Band commissioned their Composer in Residence, Andy Scott, to write a piece for brass band called To the Ancient Crosses, "a vigorous and rhythmic description of the Saxon stone carved crosses in Sandbach market square", and dedicated to Sandbach Town Council for their support of the band.

== See also ==
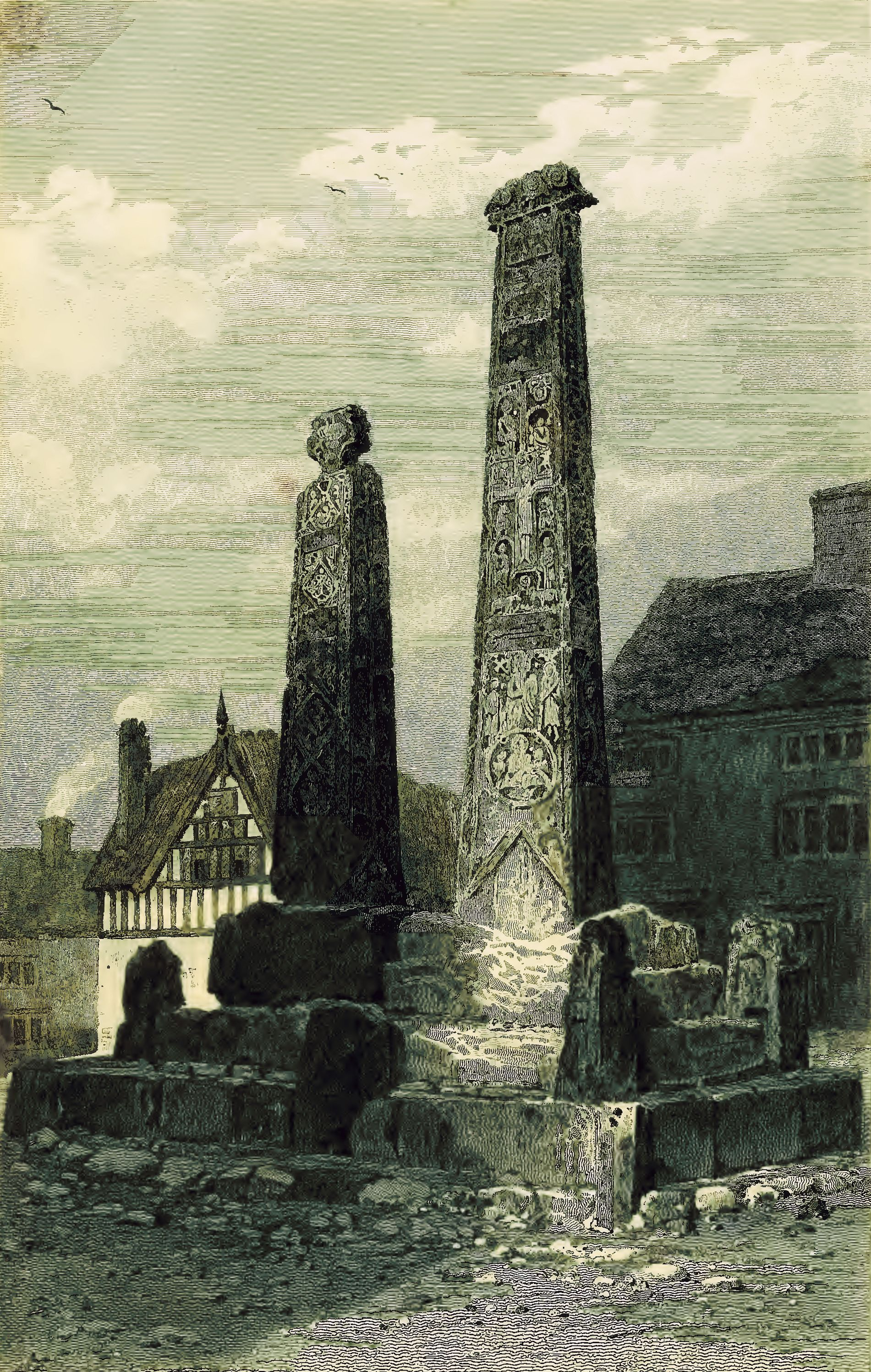
Sandbach Crosses before 1818

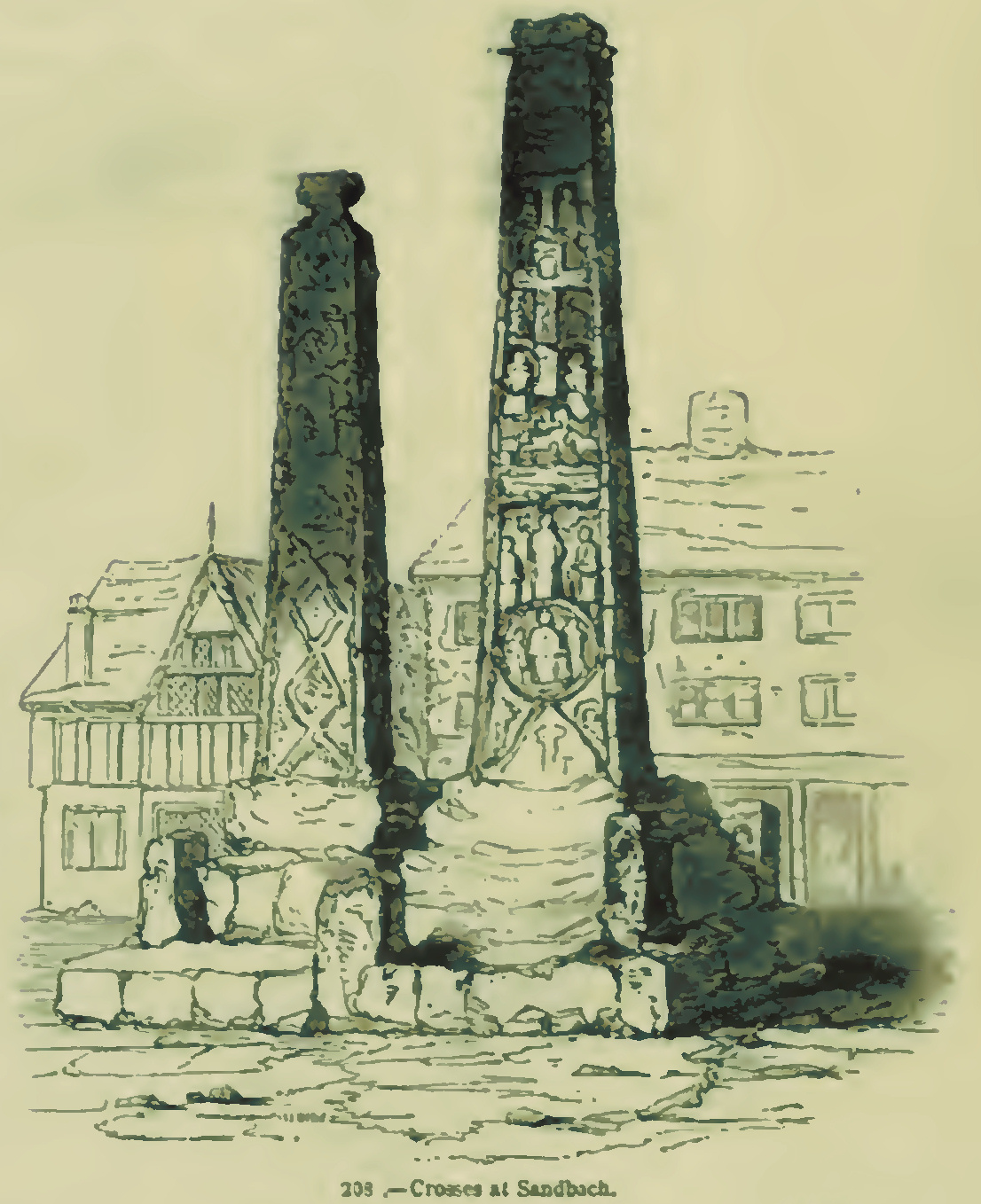
Sandbach Crosses c.1860

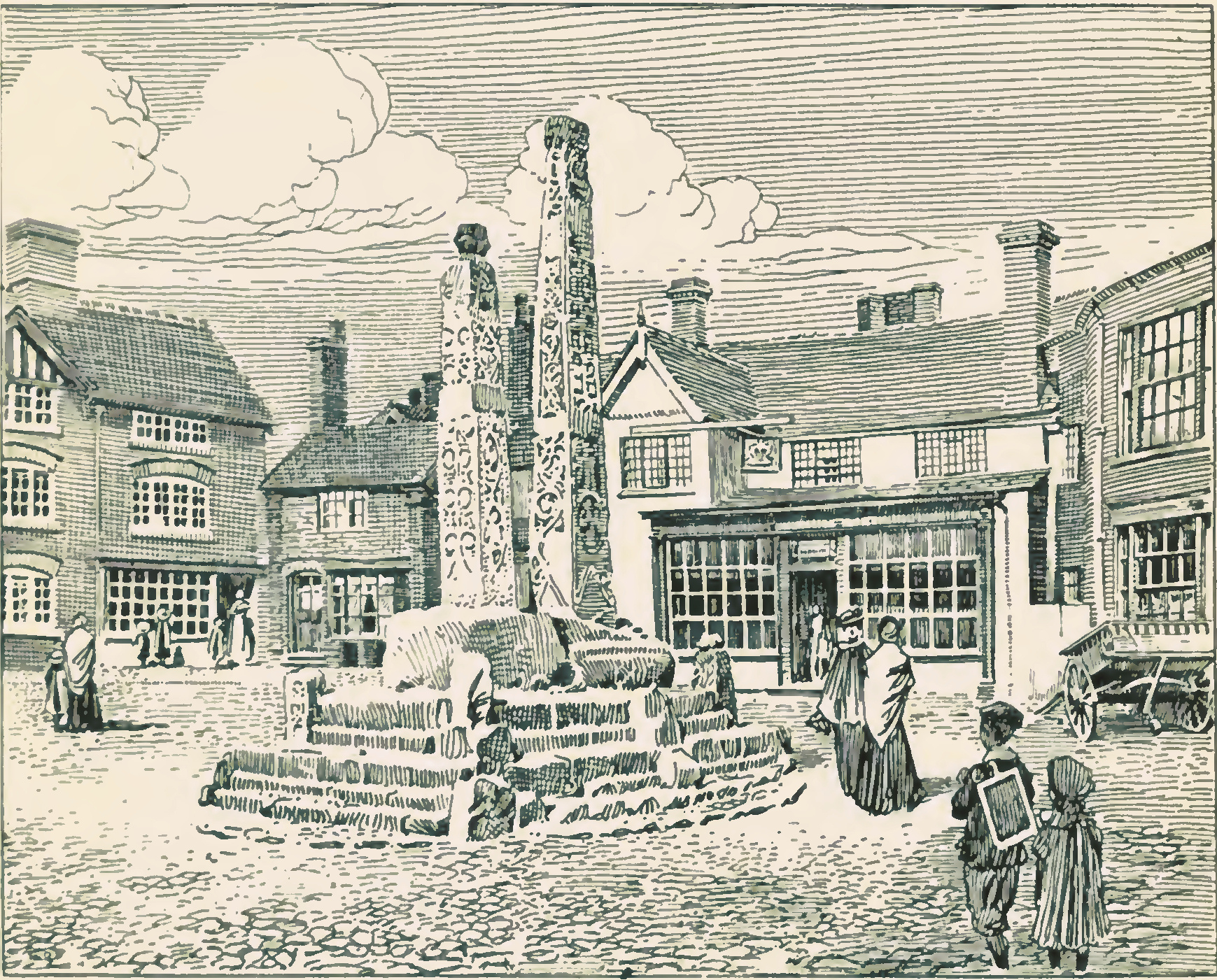
Sandbach Crosses c.1903

- Grade I listed buildings in Cheshire East
- Scheduled Monuments in Cheshire (pre-1066)
- Listed buildings in Sandbach
