= Sandbach Methodist Church =

Coordinates: 53.1448°N 2.3660°W

Methodist Church on Wesley Avenue
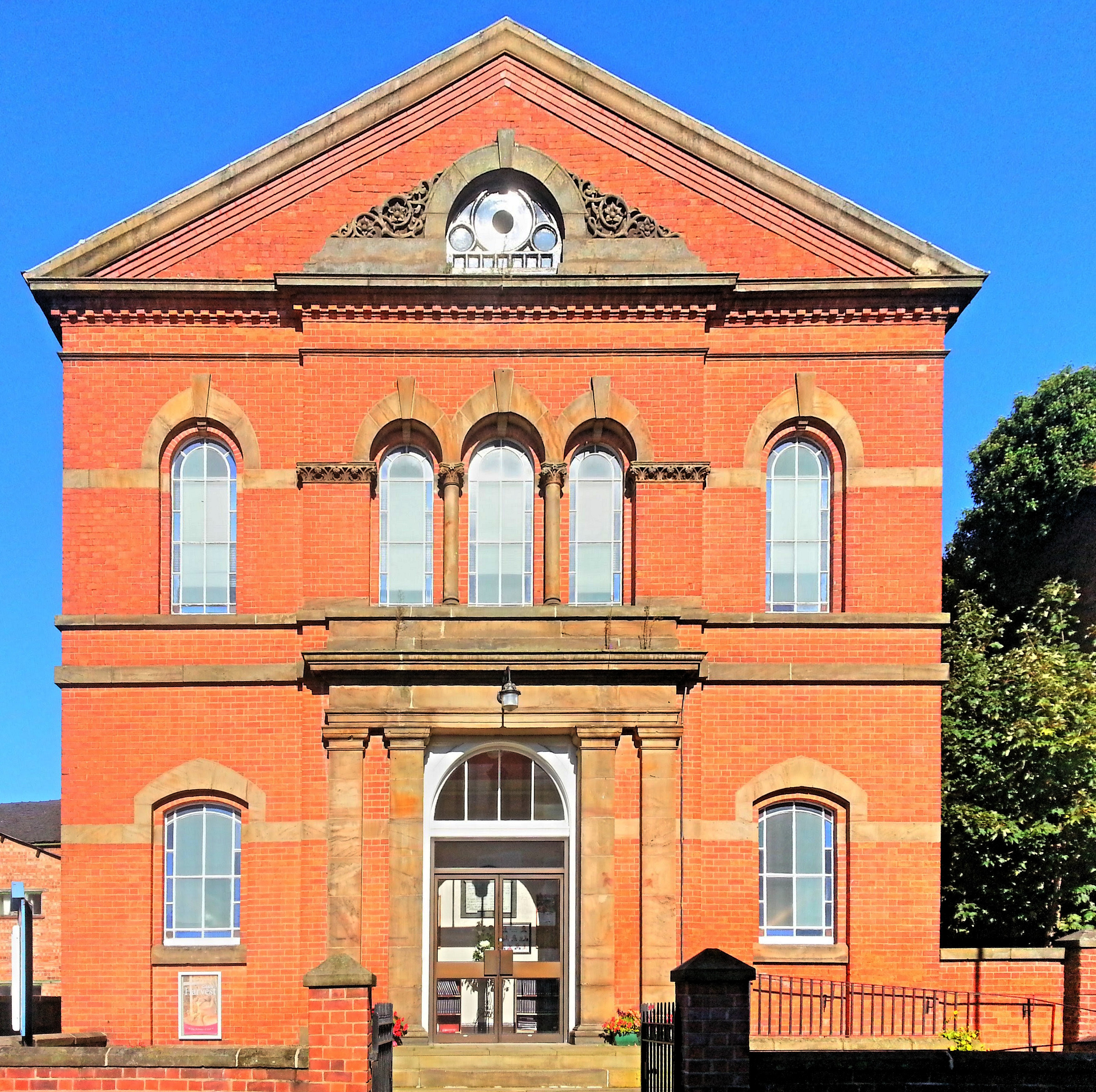

- Location in Cheshire
- OS grid reference: SJ 756 609
- Location: Wesley Avenue, Sandbach, Cheshire
- Country: England
- Denomination: Methodist
- Website: Unity Methodist Church

Architecture
- Functional status: Active
- Heritage designation: Grade II
- Designated: 26 January 1993
- Architect: Alfred Price
- Architectural type: Church
- Style: Neoclassical
- Completed: 1873

Specifications
- Materials: Brick with stone dressings

On 1 September 2020, Sandbach Methodist Church joined together with Sandbach Heath Methodist Church and Wheelock Methodist Church to become a new body called Unity Methodist Church. All three sites remain. This page relates to the site on Wesley Avenue, Sandbach, Cheshire, England. Unity Methodist Church is in the Sandbach Mission Area. The chapel and its associated Sunday school are recorded in the National Heritage List for England as a designated Grade II listed building.

== History ==
The chapel was built in 1873 to a design by Alfred Price. The choir vestry was converted into a chapel in the 1980s and has since reverted to a vestry. The former vestry has been converted into a kitchen and the former kitchen and toilet converted into a space large enough to accommodate a toilet for the disabled. An AV system was installed in the 2010s with three screens and microphones in strategic points in the worship space.

== Architecture ==
Constructed in red brick, the church has stone dressings. Its entrance front faces the street, is expressed as two storeys under a pediment, and is symmetrical with three bays. The central bay of the lower storey projects slightly as a portico surrounded by Doric pilasters and a moulded architrave. This is flanked by a window on each side. In the upper storey there are three windows in the central bay, and a single windows in each lateral bay; all have round heads. The pediment contains a semi-oculus with an elaborate surround. Along the sides of the church are two tiers of six windows, all of which are round-headed. Inside the church there are galleries on all sides that are supported by iron columns. The two-manual organ was built in 1890 by Conacher and Company, and was altered in 1938 and in 1971 by Charles Whiteley of Chester.

== Sunday school ==
The Sunday school stands behind the church and pre-dates it, being dated 1871. It was updated in the 2000s to form a large hall, meeting rooms, kitchens and toilets, but retaining its original exterior. It is known as the Wesley Centre, and was opened on 5 May 2006 by Lady Ann Winterton. The Sunday school is included in the listing.

== See also ==
- Listed buildings in Sandbach
