= Wheelock, Cheshire =

Village in Cheshire, England

Coordinates: 53.12799°N 2.37308°W

Wheelock
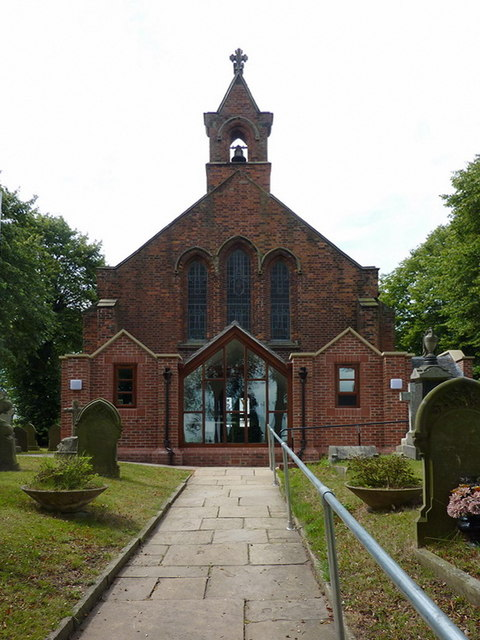
- Christ Church

- Location within Cheshire
- OS grid reference: SJ751590
- Civil parish: Sandbach
- Unitary authority: Cheshire East
- Ceremonial county: Cheshire
- Region: North West
- Country: England
- Sovereign state: United Kingdom
- Post town: SANDBACH
- Postcode district: CW11
- Dialling code: 01270
- Police: Cheshire
- Fire: Cheshire
- Ambulance: North West
- UK Parliament: Congleton

Wheelock is a large village in the civil parish of Sandbach which is in the unitary authority of Cheshire East and the ceremonial county of Cheshire, England. It is south of Sandbach on the road to Crewe. It was named after the River Wheelock.

== Overview ==
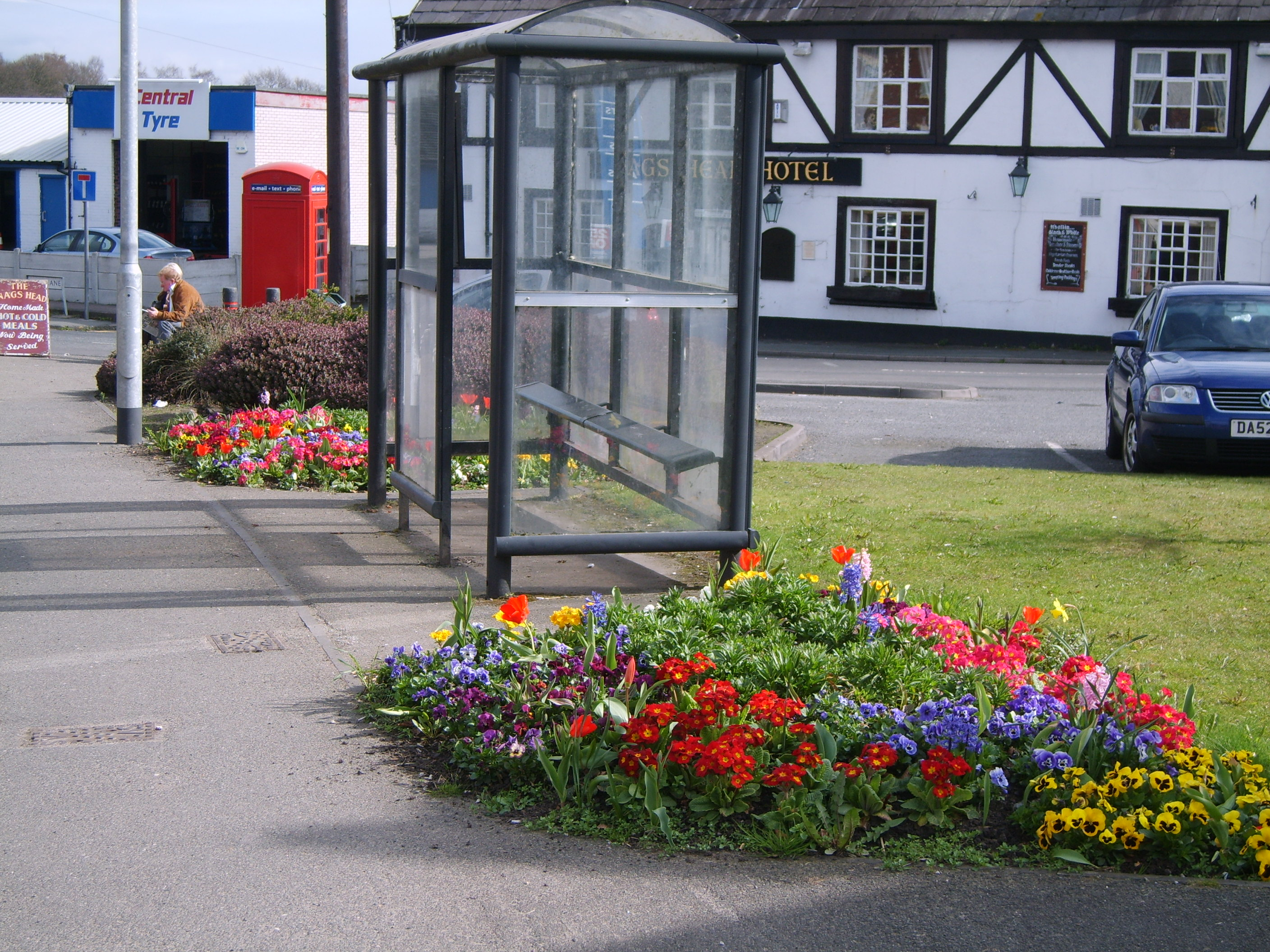
Green Bank Wheelock Spring 2009, in the background the Nags Head Hotel can be seen

Before its bypass was opened, among lorry drivers Wheelock was notorious for a vicious little hill running from the Trent and Mersey Canal bridge up to a bridge crossing over the North Staffordshire Railway near the junction with Zan Drive, particularly when winter weather made the road icy. Zan Drive leads to a small industrial area named Zan Industrial Park.

Wheelock is currently serviced by a number of local businesses. The village currently has one public house, The Cheshire Cheese, and three restaurants: a Chinese takeaway, the Shampaan Indian restaurant (in the former Nags Head pub) and Barchetta Restaurant next to the canal.

The Commercial Hotel, formerly the largest public house in the village, is now a dog centre: a small shop from which basic groceries can be purchased, and a large pet food store where all manner of foods and treats can be bought for a variety of animals also service the community.

Wheelock Hall Farm has converted their shop into a family day out. The business has been expanded to include an onsite café, and large play area for children.

== History ==
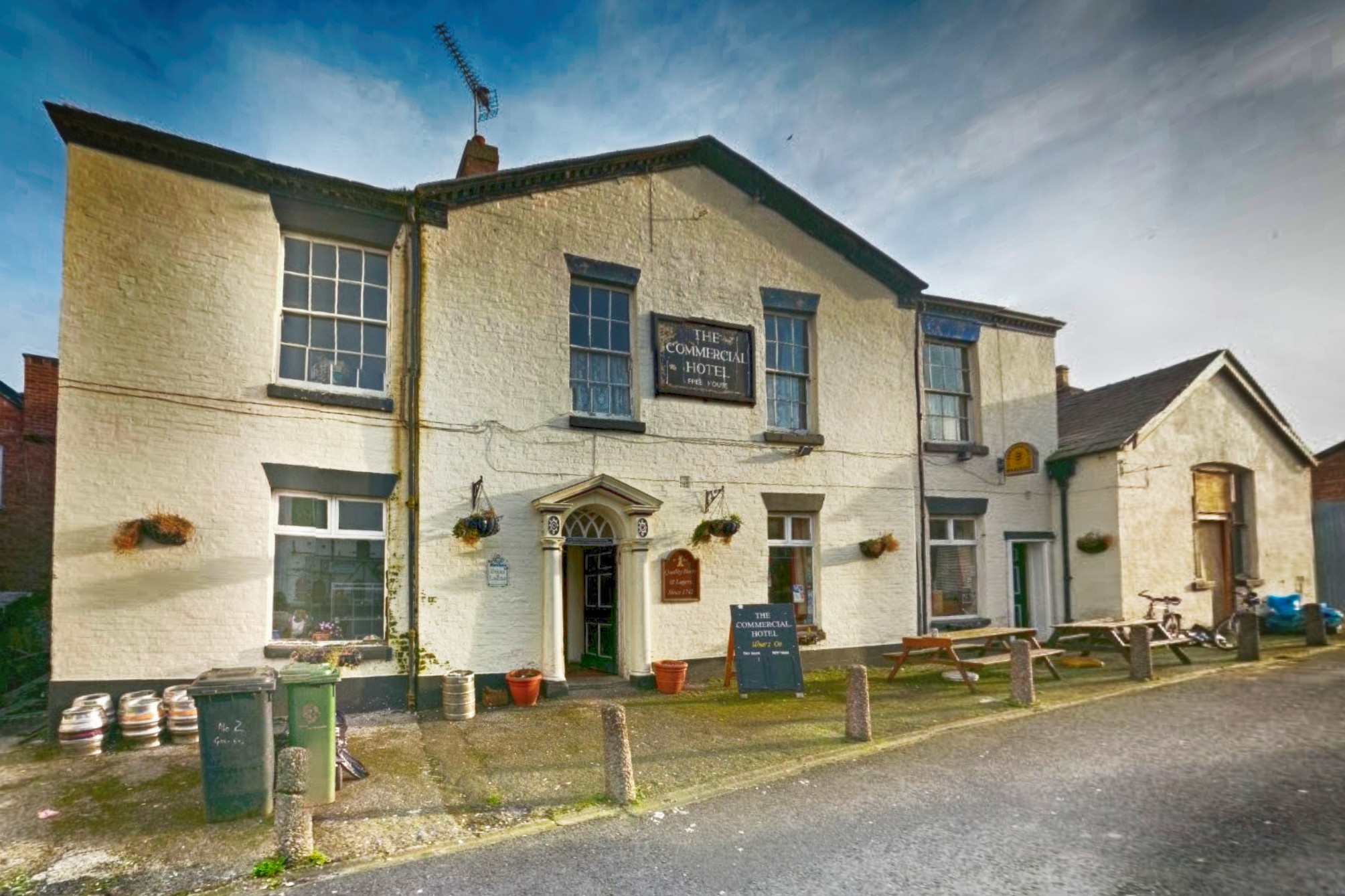
The Commercial Hotel, a Grade II Listed building and former public house

The village was named after the River Wheelock which runs through it, and in which Wheelock is derived from an Old Welsh source meaning "winding river". The first recorded name for the village is Hoileck/Hoiloch in the Domesday Book. By 1396 the name had evolved to Quelock then in 1382 to Whelock. Two years later, in 1384 it was Welock and by 1390 the name Wheelock was settled upon.

In 1801 the population was 189, by 1851 it was 548 and by 1901 it was 685. In 1931 the parish had a population of 756.

The village was originally a township and chapelry within the ancient parish of Sandbach, which formed part of Northwich Hundred. Later on it became part of Congleton Poor Law Union, Rural Sanitary District, and Rural District. Wheelock and surrounding land was made a separate civil parish in 1866, on 1 April 1936 the civil parish was abolished, with the northern part (containing the village) being transferred to Sandbach Urban District and Sandbach civil parish, and the southern part (containing the hamlet of Wheelock Heath and surrounding farmland) being transferred to Haslington civil parish in Nantwich Rural District. Ecclesiastically, Wheelock lies in the Diocese of Chester, and a separate ecclesiastical parish was formed in 1840. It first formed part of Middlewich rural deanery, but since 1880 it has been part of Congleton rural deanery.

Wheelock first lay in the general Cheshire county parliamentary constituency until 1832, when it became part of the Cheshire Southern Division constituency. From 1867 until 1885 it was in the Cheshire Middle Division constituency, and from 1885 until 1948 it lay in the parliamentary constituency of Crewe.

The village was also served by a branch line from Kidsgrove to Sandbach with a station. This has since closed and the line is now a footpath. The old station survives as a garage and some cottages.

== Governance ==
=== Local government ===
From 1974 to 2009 Wheelock had some services administered by Cheshire County Council, and others by Congleton Borough Council. On 1 April 2009 both these local authorities were succeeded by Cheshire East Council, who are based at the former Congleton Borough headquarters at Westfields in Sandbach. At the lowest level of local government Wheelock is administered by Sandbach Town Council as it is now part of Sandbach civil parish.

The village had previously been administered by Sandbach Urban District Council, until this was then merged with other urban and rural councils to form Congleton Borough Council in 1974.

=== Constituencies ===
Wheelock is in the Congleton Constituency; the MP is Sarah Russell since 2024. Before Brexit in 2020, it was part of the North West Constituency for elections to the European Parliament.

== Religious sites ==
Some of the churches in Wheelock have joined with the ecclesiastical parish of Sandbach and others to form the group Churches Together in Sandbach. This group helps bring the various denominational churches together. Wheelock has four churches:

- Christ Church, Wheelock
- Wheelock Methodist Church
- Congregational Church, Wheelock
- Jehovah’s Witnesses Kingdom Hall in Forge Fields

== Education ==
- Wheelock Primary School (formerly Wheelock County Primary School)
- Wheelock Pre-School

== Notable people ==
- Edward Harwood (1729–1794) English classical scholar and biblical critic, preached at Wheelock
- Wallace Oakes (1932–1965) awarded the George Cross after a steam train accident, lived in Wheelock

== Notes and references ==
=== Bibliography ===
- Dodgson, J. McN. (1970a). The place-names of Cheshire. Part one: Country name, regional and forest names, river names, road names, the place-names of Macclesfield hundred. Cambridge: Cambridge University Press. ISBN 0-521-07703-6.
- Dodgson, J. McN. (1970b). The place-names of Cheshire. Part two: The place-names of Bucklow Hundred and Northwich Hundred. Cambridge: Cambridge University Press. ISBN 0-521-07914-4.
- Youngs, F. A. (1991). Guide to the local administrative units of England. (Volume 1: Northern England). London: Royal Historical Society. ISBN 0-86193-127-0.
