= List of new churches by George Gilbert Scott in Northern England =

George Gilbert Scott (1811–78) was an English architect. Following his training, in 1836 he started working with William Bonython Moffatt, and they entered into partnership, initially specialising in designing workhouses. Scott became increasingly interested in the Gothic style, and the design of churches in this style. The partnership was dissolved in 1846, and Scott then set up his own office. He became "known primarily as a church architect", and as such he designed many new churches, and restored many more. In addition he designed monuments and memorials, public buildings including government offices, educational buildings, commercial buildings, and houses.

This list contains new churches designed by Scott in the north of England, more specifically in the North West, North East, and Yorkshire and the Humber regions. It is not complete, not least because some of the churches have been demolished.

== Key ==
Grade	Criteria
Grade I	Buildings of exceptional interest, sometimes considered to be internationally important.
Grade II*	Particularly important buildings of more than special interest.
Grade II	Buildings of national importance and special interest.

== Churches ==
Name	Location	Photograph	Date	Notes	Grade
Christ Church	Bridlington, East Riding of Yorkshire; 54.0847°N 0.1932°W		1840	A Commissioners' church designed with Moffatt in Early English style, it was extended in 1851 and the steeple was added in 1859. It is in sandstone with a brick interior and slate roofs. The church consists of a nave, aisles, north and south transepts, a chancel, and a southwest steeple. The steeple has four stages with octagonal angle buttresses rising to form turrets with pinnacles. On the tower is a tall spire with two tiers of lucarnes.	II
St Mark's Church	Worsley, Greater Manchester; 53.5023°N 2.3849°W		1845–46	The church was built for Francis Egerton, 1st Earl of Ellesmere, and the north aisle was added in 1851. It is in stone with roofs of slate and copper, and consists of a nave with a clerestory, aisles, a chancel with a chapel, vestry and organ chamber, and a west steeple. The steeple has four stages, buttresses with gables, a west doorway, clock faces, crocketed gables, gargoyles, and a recessed spire with flying buttresses and lucarnes. The monument to Francis Egerton in the church was also designed by Scott.	I
Church of St Andrew and St Mary	Wakefield, West Yorkshire; 53.6827°N 1.4896°W	—	1846	The church is in Early English style, and built in sandstone with freestone dressings and slate roofs. It consists of a nave, aisles, and a chancel with a north vestry. On the west gable is a single bellcote. The interior of the church was reordered in the 1970s.	II
St John's Church	Sewerby, East Riding of Yorkshire; 54.1035°N 0.1646°W		1846–48	St John's is in Norman style, and is built in sandstone with slate roofs. It consists of a nave, a chancel, a north transept, a northeast vestry, and a steeple at the southeast corner of the nave. The steeple has a slender tower with blind arcading in the bell stage, and a lead-covered splay-footed spire. At the west end is a central round-headed window flanked by intersecting arcades. In the gable is a vesica-shaped window and two small roundels.	II*
St Mark's Church	Antrobus, Cheshire; 53.3124°N 2.5349°W	—	1847–48	St Mark's was a Commissioners' church. It is in sandstone with a slate roof, and is in Decorated style. The church consists of a nave and chancel in one unit, without aisles, and a north vestry. On the east end of the nave is a bell-turret with a pyramidal roof and a weathervane. There is a south porch, and a priest's door in a broad buttress.	II
Christ Church	Denton, Greater Manchester; 53.4560°N 2.1218°W		1848–53	A Commissioners' church in stone with a slate roof in Gothic Revival style. It consists of a nave, aisles, a chancel and a northwest steeple. The steeple has a three-stage tower, clock faces, and a broach spire with lucarnes. The west and east windows contain geometrical tracery.	II
St John's Church	Kingsley, Cheshire; 53.2701°N 2.6799°W	—	1849–50	St John's is in sandstone with a slate roof, and is in Decorated style. It consists of a west steeple embraced by chambers, a nave, a short north aisle, a south porch, and a chancel with a north vestry. The steeple has a tower of one stage above the nave roof, a corbel table, and a splay-footed spire with lucarnes and clock faces. Inside the church the aisle arcade is in timber.	II
St Mary's Church	Ambleside, Cumbria; 54.4310°N 2.9668°W		1850–54	St Mary's is in Decorated style. A vestry was added in 1889 by Paley and Austin. The church is built in slatestone with sandstone dressings and slate roofs, and consists of a nave, aisles, north and south porches, a chancel with a northeast vestry and a northeast chapel, and a southeast steeple. The steeple has a four-stage tower and a southeast stair turret, diagonal buttresses with gables, a four-light south window, and a broach spire with three tiers of lucarnes and a weathervane. On the church are seven gables with cross finials of different designs.	II*
St Mary's Church	Halton, Runcorn, Cheshire; 53.3320°N 2.6963°W		1851–52	The church is built in sandstone with slate roofs. It consists of a nave with a clerestory, north and south aisles, and a chancel. There is an octagonal bellcote on the east gable of the nave, with gablets and a spirelet.	II
St Barnabas' Church	Weeton, North Yorkshire; 53.9139°N 1.5694°W		1851–53	The church was designed for the Earl of Harewood. It is in gritstone, and has a roof of Westmorland slate. The church has a cruciform plan, and it consists of a nave, transepts, a chancel with a northeast vestry, and a central steeple with a broach spire.	II*
St John's Church	Bilton, Harrogate, North Yorkshire; 54.0082°N 1.5369°W		1851–57	St John's is in gritstone with dressings in contrasting colours and a green slate roof. It consists of a nave with a clerestory, aisles, a south porch, a chancel and a west tower. The tower was designed to carry a spire, but this was never built. The aisle windows are lancets and the windows in the clerestory have two lights.	II*
St Mary's Church	West Derby, Liverpool, Merseyside; 53.4334°N 2.9086°W		1853–56	St Mary's is in red sandstone with slate roofs, and is in Geometrical style. It consists of a nave with a clerestory, aisles, north and south porches, transepts, a chancel with north and south chapels and a south vestry, and a tower at the crossing. The tower has two stages with a pierced parapet and octagonal angle turrets with crocketed pinnacles.	II*
St James' Church	New Brighton, Wirral, Merseyside; 53.4372°N 3.0456°W		1854–56	The church is in stone with a slate roof, and has a cruciform plan. It consists of a nave with a clerestory, aisles, north and south transepts, a chancel with a south chapel and vestry, and a northeast steeple. The steeple has a four-stage tower with gabled angle buttresses, an east doorway, blind arcading to the north, a cornice with ball flowers, and a broach spire with lucarnes and niches above the broaches.	II
St George's Minster	Doncaster, South Yorkshire; 53.5256°N 1.1354°W		1854–58	St George's Minster is in ashlar stone with lead roofs, the tower is in Perpendicular style, and the nave and chancel are in a combination of late Geometrical and early Decorated styles. The church has a cruciform plan, consisting of a nave with a clerestory, aisles, a south porch, a tower at the crossing, north and south transepts, and a chancel, also with aisles. The tower has two stages above the crossing, angle buttresses, a circular stair turret at the northeast corner, and pierced, crocketed, and gableted parapets with corner and central pinnacles.	I
St Michael's Church	Hulme Walfield, Cheshire; 53.1821°N 2.2320°W		1855–56	The church is built in sandstone, and is in Decorated style. It consists of a nave, a north aisle, a northwest porch, a chancel, a southeast vestry, and a northeast organ chamber. On the east gable of the nave is a gabled doublebellcote. Inside the church the arcade has circular piers with capitals carved with naturalistic foliage.	II
St John the Evangelist's Church	Cadeby, South Yorkshire; 53.4989°N 1.2254°W		1856	The church was built for Sir Joseph Copley, it became redundant in 1990, and was vested in the Churches Conservation Trust the following year. It is in ashlar magnesian limestone and has a slate roof. The church consists of a nave, aisles, a south porch, and a chancel with chapels. At the junction of the nave and chancel is a bellcote.	II
All Souls Church	Halifax, West Yorkshire; 53.7305°N 1.8628°W		1856	All Souls church is built in stone, it has a slate roof, and is in Decorated style. The church has a cruciform plan, and it consists of a nave with a clerestory, aisles, a south porch, north and south transepts, a chancel with chapels, and a northwest steeple. There is a baptistry in the base of the tower.	I
St Michael's Church	Crewe Green, Cheshire; 53.0947°N 2.40920°W		1857–58	The church is in red brick on a sandstone plinth, with blue brick diapering, bands of encaustic tiles, and a tile roof. It consists of a nave, a chancel with an apse, and a north bell-turret. The bell-turret is octagonal, slightly corbelled out, and has a stone roof. The buttresses have poppyhead finials, and the shafts have capitals carved with naturalistic foliage. The interior also contains polychrome brickwork.	II*
St Thomas' Church	Huddersfield, Kirklees, West Yorkshire; 53.6424°N 1.7924°W		1857–59	The church is in stone with a slate roof. It consists of a nave, aisles under separate roofs, a chancel with a north chapel and vestry, a south sacristy, and a west steeple. The steeple has a tower with four stages, octagonal stair towers with conical roofs, and a broach spire with gabled lucarnes.	II*
St James' Church	Doncaster, South Yorkshire; 53.5189°N 1.1387°W		1858	The church was designed in conjunction with Lord Grimthorpe for the Great Northern Railway. It is in Geometrical style, and is built in Ancaster stone with tile roofs. The church consists of two parallel ranges running north–south, with an east porch, and a central steeple at the south. The steeple has a square base, tapering to an octagonal bell stage with a ballflower cornice and gargoyles. On the tower is a spire with bands of blind quatrefoils.	II
St John's Church	Sandbach Heath, Sandbach, Cheshire; 53.1507°N 2.3374°W		1861	St John's is in yellow stone with red sandstone dressings, and is in Decorated style. It has a cruciform plan, and consists of a nave, north and south transepts, a chancel, and a steeple at the crossing. The capitals around the crossing are carved with foliage and angels.	II
St Barnabas' Church	Bromborough, Wirral, Merseyside; 53.3329°N 2.9788°W		1862–64	The steeple was completed in 1800. The church is in red sandstone with slate roofs, and is in Early English style. It consists of a nave with clerestory, aisles, a chancel with a semicircular apse, a south vestry, and a northeast steeple. The steeple has a tower with angle buttresses, a stair turret, clock faces, a Lombard frieze, and a broach spire with lucarnes.	II*
All Saints Church	Scholar Green, Odd Rode, Cheshire; 53.3329°N 2.9788°W		1863–64	All Saints is in stone with a tile roof. It consists of a nave, a south aisle, a southwest porch, a chancel, and a northeast vestry. At the west end is a central doorway, above which is a three-light window, a canopied niche containing a statue of Christ, a gabled bellcote with two lancet openings, and a weathervane.	II*
St Peter's Church	Arthington, Leeds, West Yorkshire; 53.8975°N 1.5811°W		1864	The church is in sandstone with a slate roof. It consists of a nave, a northwest steeple, north and south transepts, and a chancel. The steeple has a three-stage tower, it incorporates a porch, and has a north doorway, angle pilasters, a corbel table, and a broach spire with lucarnes. At the west end is a five-bay arcade with wheel window above.	II
St Luke's Church	Pendleton, Salford, Greater Manchester; 53.4840°N 2.3028°W		1865	The chancel chapel was added in 1873–78 to Scott's design. The church is in sandstone with a tile roof, and consists of a nave with a clerestory, aisles, a north porch, a chancel with a polygonal apse, north and south chapels, and a west steeple. The steeple has angle buttresses and a broach spire with lucarnes.	II*
St Thomas of Canterbury Church	Chester, Cheshire; 53.1984°N 2.8964°W		1869–72	The west bays were completed in 1881 by John Oldrid Scott. The church is in red sandstone with slate roofs, and is in Early English style. It consists of a nave, aisles, a north porch, a chancel with a north chapel, and a southeast tower. Only two of the intended three stages of the tower were completed. There is a square turret at the southwest corner of the tower that has a timber belfry with a pyramidal copper roof.	II
St Matthew's Church	Stretton, Cheshire; 53.3404°N 2.5717°W		1870	The church is in Early English style, and is built in red sandstone with Westmorland slate roofs. It consists of a nave with a clerestory, aisles, a chancel with a north vestry and a west tower. The tower has three stages, angle buttresses, an octagonal northeast turret, and a corbelled plain parapet.	II
St Mary's Church	Mirfield, Kirklees, West Yorkshire; 53.6798°N 1.6814°W		1871	St Mary's is in Early English style, and is built in ashlar with a stone slate roof. It consists of a nave with a clerestory, aisles, a south porch, a chancel with a south chapel and a north vestry, and a west tower. The tower has four stages, with diagonal buttresses that rise to octagonal and terminate in pinnacles with spire. At the top is a plain parapet on a corbel table.	II*
St Thomas' Church, Green Hammerton	Green Hammerton, North Yorkshire		1876		II
All Souls Church	Leeds, West Yorkshire; 53.8080°N 1.5468°W		1876–80	The church is in gritstone with a slate roof. It consists of a nave with a clerestory, aisles, a south porch, a chancel, and a large northwest tower. The tower has four stages, an octagonal stair turret, a pierced parapet with a short pyramidal spire. The building of the church was completed after Scott's death by his son John Oldrid Scott.	II*
