= All Saints Church, Scholar Green =

Coordinates: 53.1142°N 2.2645°W

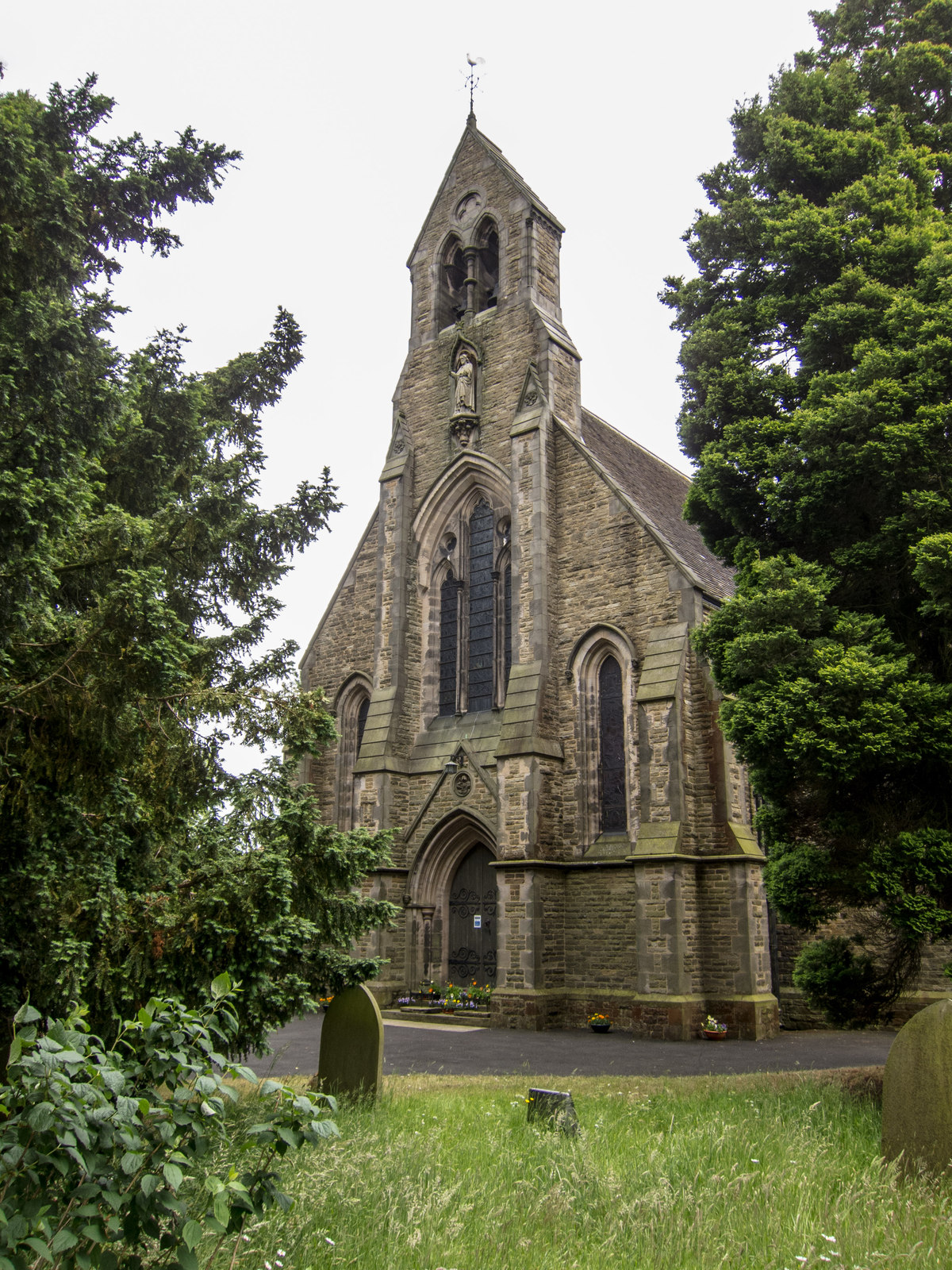
- West end of All Saints Church, Scholar Green

- Location in Cheshire
- OS grid reference: SJ 824 575
- Location: Scholar Green, Odd Rode, Cheshire
- Country: England
- Denomination: Anglican
- Churchmanship: Traditional
- Website: All Saints, Scholar Green

History
- Status: Parish church
- Founder: Randle Wilbraham III

Architecture
- Functional status: Active
- Heritage designation: Grade II*
- Designated: 14 February 1967
- Architect: George Gilbert Scott
- Architectural type: Church
- Style: Gothic Revival
- Groundbreaking: 1863
- Completed: 1864
- Construction cost: Nearly £5,914

Specifications
- Materials: Stone, slate roof

Administration
- Province: York
- Diocese: Chester
- Archdeaconry: Macclesfield
- Deanery: Congleton
- Parish: Odd Rode

Clergy
- Rector: Revd Philip Atkinson

All Saints Church is in the village of Scholar Green in the parish of Odd Rode, Cheshire, England. It is an Anglican parish church in the deanery of Congleton, the archdeaconry of Macclesfield, and the diocese of Chester. The church is recorded in the National Heritage List for England as a designated Grade II* listed building.

The church continues to be active, and works in association with the other churches in the parish, the Church of the Good Shepherd, Rode Heath, and St Luke's Mission Church, Mow Cop.

== History ==
The church was built in 1863–64 and designed by George Gilbert Scott. It was commissioned by Randle Wilbraham III of Rode Hall. The family had worshipped at St Mary's Church, Astbury, but Wilbraham wanted to have a church in Odd Rode. He had previously bought an old chapel in the parish for the purpose, but this was too small, and in 1861 he commissioned Scott to design a new church. Building began in 1863, but Wilbraham died during the first year of construction, and the church was completed and paid for by his son, Randle Wilbraham IV. It cost nearly £5,914, and was dedicated in 1864.

The pipe organ was made in 1887 by Wadsworth at a cost of £280. From 1896 until 1906, the organist was Havergal Brian. Brian was born in Longton, and around the time he started at All Saints he set out to become a composer. He wrote a large number of symphonies.

== Architecture ==
=== Exterior ===
All Saints is constructed in rubble with ashlar dressings, and has a tiled roof. Its plan consists of a nave, a south aisle, a chancel, a southwest porch, and a northeast vestry. The west end of the nave is symmetrical and is in three bays divided by buttresses with offsets. In the centre is a doorway with a moulded surround that includes small pillars, and above it is a hood mould, the label stops of which are carved with figureheads, one male, one female. Over the doorway is a gablet with a roundel containing a flower. Above this is a three-light window, and over that is a canopied niche containing a statue of Christ. At the top of the bay there is a double bellcote under a gablet containing a trefoil and surmounted by a weathercock. The lateral bays of the west end of the nave contain lancet windows, and at the corners are buttresses. The west end of the aisle is recessed and contains a three-light window. At its top is a gable containing an octofoil and surmounted by a cross finial. The sides of the church are in four bays divided by buttresses, and each bay contains a two-light window, other than the second bay of the aisle which contains a porch. The porch is gabled and has a pointed arch with semi-octagonal colonettes, a hood mould with figurehead label stops, and a cross finial. On the south side of the chancel is a chapel with a doorway, and on the north side is a gabled vestry. The east window has five lights, the label stops of its hood mould being carved with a bishop and a queen.

=== Interior ===
The arcade between the nave and the aisle is carried on quatrefoil piers, and the aisle has a barrel vaulted roof. The chancel arch is flanked by marble columns with foliate capitals. There are more marble columns flanking the east window, and between the chancel and the chapel. Also between the chancel and the chapel is a wrought iron screen with three arched openings. This was made by Skidmore of Coventry. A niche in the chapel contains a terracotta bust of Randle Wilbraham III, carved by A. Carrier-Belleuse in 1854. The octagonal pulpit is in alabaster and has arcades with marble columns containing a mosaic inlay. The font is also in alabaster, and is in the shape of a chalice. The reredos is a memorial to Randle Wilbraham III and his wife, and is based on The Last Supper by Leonardo da Vinci. The stained glass in the east window is a memorial to Randle Wilbraham IV. It was made in 1864 by the O'Connor firm, and the west window is a Jesse window by C. E. Kempe dated 1908. The bells for the bellcote were made by Taylor of Loughborough.

== Appraisal ==
All Saints Church was designated as a Grade II* listed building on 14 February 1967. Grade II* is the middle of the three grades of listing, and is applied to "particularly important buildings of more than special interest". The architectural historian Goodhart-Rendel said of the church "Taking things all round, I like this best of any Scott church I have seen ... Everything seems to me a triumph of the academic type of good Gothic design ... there is nothing but safety first – but it is safety". The description of the church in the National Heritage List for England concludes by saying "not only the design but the craftsmanship is of high quality".

== See also ==
- Grade II* listed buildings in Cheshire East
- List of new churches by George Gilbert Scott in Northern England
- Listed buildings in Odd Rode
