= Hammerton =

Hammerton may refer to:

== Place names in England ==
- Green Hammerton, a village and civil parish in the Harrogate district of North Yorkshire
- Kirk Hammerton, a village and civil parish in the Harrogate district of North Yorkshire
- Hammerton railway station, serves the villages of Kirk Hammerton and Green Hammerton in North Yorkshire
- Hammerton's Ferry, a pedestrian and cycle ferry service across the River Thames in Richmond upon Thames, London

== Other uses ==
- Hammerton (surname)
- Mark Hammerton Group Ltd, a UK based travel organiser

== See also ==
- Hammertone, a lacquer that looks like hammered metal
- Hammertown (disambiguation)
