= Cadeby Main pit disaster =

1912 coal mining accident in England

Coordinates: 53°29′24″N 1°13′40″W

The Cadeby Main Pit Disaster was a coal mining accident on 9 July 1912 which occurred at Cadeby Main Colliery in Cadeby, West Riding of Yorkshire, England, killing 91 men. Early in the morning of 9 July an explosion in the south-west part of the Cadeby Main pit killed 35 men, with three more dying later due to their injuries. Later in the same day, after a rescue party was sent below ground, another explosion occurred, killing 53 men of the rescue party.

== Disaster ==
Opened in 1893, the Cadeby Main pit was owned by the Denaby and Cadeby Colliery Company, 5,000 men worked in Cadeby and at the related Denaby pit. The King and Queen had been visiting mining villages in the area, so the number of men below ground was lower than usual following celebrations the day before. Only about 200 men were in the pit when an explosion occurred at about 02:00, in the direct area of the explosion 35 men were killed. News of the disaster soon spread around Conisbrough and district and women and children rushed to the pit head. Men who were not at work also turned up to help with the rescue but nothing could be done at first due to the fear of afterdamp.

Soon volunteers entered the pit to search for bodies, and these rescue teams were hampered by heavy falls of coal and stone. By 08:00 only six bodies had been brought to the surface. Further explosions occurred while the rescue team were at work, killing some of the rescuers. A total of 53 men were killed in the later explosions, including William H. Pickering, the Chief Government Inspector of Mines for Yorkshire and the North Midlands (and husband of tennis player Alice Pickering), and Charles Bury, the manager of the colliery, who died the following week from his injuries.

== Aftermath ==
The King and Queen, who were visiting mining villages in the area, went to the pit the following day to ascertain the situation and give support to the families. This fact was mentioned in the 1977 film The Price of Coal, during a discussion by the managers of the colliery.

Two colliery deputies were awarded the Edward Medal first class, as well as three second class medals, for gallantry during the disaster.

Memorials to remember the 91 victims were unveiled at cemeteries in Conisbrough and Denaby on 9 July 2012, the 100th anniversary of the disaster.

== Report ==
The Chief Inspector of Mines issued a report in May 1913 detailing the accident. He concluded that "a fire which had started some years before had never really been put out" and "had caused a small explosion in the same area" in January 1912. The "circumstances on the day encouraged the larger explosion". The inspector did criticise the rescue effort, and although many men were trained in rescue work, other "unauthorised men" had also entered the mine to help, which increased the death toll from the second explosion.
