= Ramsdell Hall =

Country house in Cheshire, England

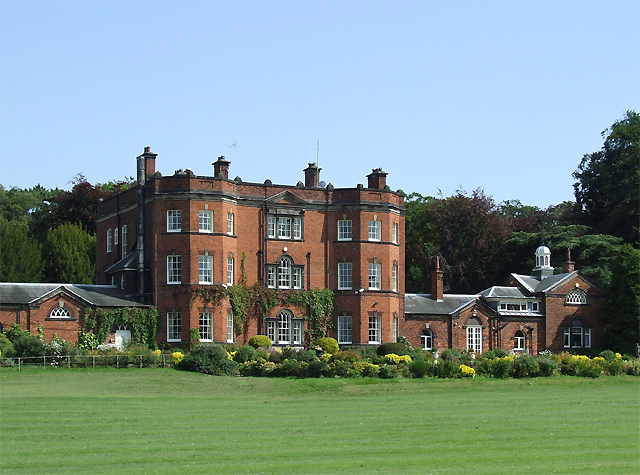
- Ramsdell Hall

- Location in Cheshire
- 53.11977°N 2.23639°W
- Location: Odd Rode, Cheshire, England
- OS grid reference: SJ 843 581

History
- Built: 18th century

Listed Building – Grade II*
- Designated: 14 February 1967
- Reference no.: 1138715

Ramsdell Hall is a country house in the parish of Odd Rode in Cheshire, England, overlooking the Macclesfield Canal. It was built in two phases during the 18th century, and is still in private ownership.

== History ==
The house was built by William Lowndes in about 1760 in two phases. The central block was built in the middle of the century, and the wings were added later, probably in about 1768. It is possible that the architect for both phases was William Baker. The house continues to be in private ownership.

== Architecture ==
Ramsdell Hall is constructed in brick with ashlar dressings and a slate roof. It consists of a three-storey central block, with single-storey wings ending in two-storey pavilions. The central block has an L-shaped plan. The garden front of the central block is symmetrical and has three bays. The central bay has Venetian windows in the ground and middle floors, and a three-light window in the top floor. The lateral bays have canted bay windows rising through all three storeys. Above the top floor windows is a cornice, with a pediment above the window in the central bay. Over this is a brick parapet with ball finials. The side wings each have three bays with round-arched windows. The central bay on each side projects slightly, with pilasters and an open pediment. The pavilions also project slightly, and have Venetian windows in the lower floor, with lunette windows in the gables above. The pavilions are surmounted by circular lanterns with ogee-shaped roofs and weathervanes. To the rear of the central block is a gabled wing. The entrance to the house is at the angle of the two wings. The interior contains an octagonal dining room, a hexagonal hall, and a drawing room with a Rococo ceiling. The house is recorded in the National Heritage List for England as a designated Grade II* listed building. The architectural historian Nikolaus Pevsner describes it as "a curious house", while the architectural writers Figueirdo and Treuherz say it is "an appealingly quirky house".

== Associated structures ==
There are two structures associated with the house that have been listed at Grade II. The gate piers date from the early 18th century, and the gates from the later part of the same century. The piers are in rusticated yellow sandstone ashlar. Each supports a trophy in Portland stone, consisting of an eagle supporting a shield with a boar's head crest. The gate piers and gates were moved to the house in the 1950s by Stanley Harrison, the owner of the house at that time. Immediately to the east of the hall is a two-storey timber-framed house, originating in the 16th century, with later additions and alterations. The timber-framing infill is a mixture of brick and wattle and daub.

== See also ==
- Grade II* listed buildings in Cheshire East
- Listed buildings in Odd Rode
