= Listed buildings in Kirk Hammerton =

Kirk Hammerton is a civil parish in the county of North Yorkshire, England. It contains seven listed buildings, which are recorded in the National Heritage List for England. Of these, one is listed Grade I, the highest of the three grades, and the others are Grade II, the lowest grade. The parish contains the village of Kirk Hammerton and the surrounding area. The listed buildings are a church, two houses, a road bridge, a milepost, a railway signal box and a telephone kiosk.

== Key ==
Grade	Criteria
I	Buildings of exceptional interest, sometimes considered to be internationally important
II	Buildings of national importance and special interest

== Buildings ==
Name and location	Photograph	Date	Notes	Grade
St John the Baptist Church; 53.99369°N 1.29188°W		10th century or before	Most of the church is Saxon, with additions in 1890–91 by C. Hodgson Fowler. It is built in gritstone, with a stone slate roof on the earlier part and tile roof on the later part. It consists of a nave, north and south aisles, a chancel with a north vestry and a southwest tower. The tower has two stages, a west doorway with a parabolic arch, a band, round-headed bell openings divided by colonettes and a shallow pyramidal roof. The south doorway has a round arch, a band and imposts, and the east window is Perpendicular with three lights.	I
Kirk Hammerton Hall; 53.99261°N 1.29189°W	—	Mid 18th century	The house is in red brick with stone dressings, sill and floor bands, dentilled eaves, a parapet and a Westmorland slate roof. There are two storeys and three bays, a two-storey two-bay rear wing and flanking single-storey additions. In the centre is a doorway with Doric pilasters and a fluted entablature. Above it is a sash window, in front of which are wrought iron railings. The outer bays contain two-storey canted bay windows with hipped roofs.	II
Keepers Cottage; 53.99304°N 1.29370°W	—	Late 18th century	The house is in brown brick a with a stone slate roof. There are two storeys and three bays, and lower-flanking two-storey one-bay wings with hipped roofs. The central doorway has a plain surround and a cornice and the windows are sashes with gauged brick flat arches.	II
Skip Bridge; 53.99766°N 1.26574°W		Early 19th century	The bridge carries Old York Road over the River Nidd. It is in stone and consists of three round arches with round cutwaters rising to pedestrian refuges. The bridge has square pilasters, a projecting band and a parapet with shallow pointed coping.	II
Milepost; 54.00150°N 1.32115°W		19th century	The milepost on the south side of the A59 road consists of a cast iron plate on stone, about 80 centimetres (31 in) high. It has a triangular plan and a rounded top. On the top is inscribed "Knaresborough & Green Hammerton Road" and "Green Hammerton"; on the left side is the distance to Knaresborough and on the right side to Green Hammerton.	II
Signal box, Hammerton railway station 53.99753°N 1.32031°W		1914	The signal box, built by the North Eastern Railway, is on the north platform of the station. It consists of a timber-boarded cupboard about 2 metres (6 ft 7 in) wide and 1 metre (3 ft 3 in) deep. There are no windows, at the rear are doors, and there is a peephole on the west side giving a view of the level crossing. Inside there is a ten-lever frame.	II
Telephone kiosk 53.99333°N 1.29132°W		1935	The K6 type telephone kiosk was designed by Giles Gilbert Scott. Constructed in cast iron with a square plan and a dome, it has three unperforated crowns in the top panels.	II
