= Listed buildings in Cadeby, South Yorkshire =

Cadeby is a civil parish in the metropolitan borough of Doncaster, South Yorkshire, England. The parish contains five listed buildings that are recorded in the National Heritage List for England. All the listed buildings are designated at Grade II, the lowest of the three grades, which is applied to "buildings of national importance and special interest". The parish contains the village of Cadeby and the surrounding countryside. The listed buildings consist of a farmhouse, a barn, a church, and the two portals of Conisbrough Railway Tunnel.

== Buildings ==
Name and location	Photograph	Date	Notes
White House Farmhouse; 53.50024°N 1.22144°W	—	Mid 18th century	The farmhouse, which was later extended, is in magnesian limestone, with quoins in both parts. The original part has a stone slate roof, two storeys and attics, and three bays. In the centre is a doorway flanked by canted bay windows, and in the upper floor are sash windows. The extension to the left has a pantile roof, two storeys, one bay, and a parapet.
Barn to rear of Cadeby Inn; 53.49810°N 1.22338°W	—	c. 1800	The barn is in magnesian limestone, with quoins, and stone slate eaves courses to a hipped pantile roof. It contains a segmental-arched wagon entrance with quoined jambs and a keystone, hatches, and slit vents.
East portal, Conisbrough Tunnel; 53.49064°N 1.21504°W	—	1849	The tunnel was built by the South Yorkshire, Doncaster and Goole Railway Company. The east portal has gritstone voussoirs, and sandstone walling. It consists of a horseshoe arch with quoined buttresses, and is rusticated below an impost band and a moulded hood mould. Over the buttresses is a moulded cornice.
West portal, Conisbrough Tunnel; 53.48987°N 1.21796°W	—	1849	The tunnel was built by the South Yorkshire, Doncaster and Goole Railway Company. The west portal has gritstone voussoirs, and sandstone walling. It consists of a horseshoe arch with a moulded hood mould set in a panel with rusticated quoins. There is a heavy moulded cornice.
St John's Church; 53.49895°N 1.22540°W		1856	The church, now redundant, was designed by George Gilbert Scott in Gothic Revival style. It is in magnesian limestone with a slate roof, and consists of a nave, north and south aisles and a chancel in a single vessel, and a south porch. On the roof between the nave and the chancel is a bellcote. Along the sides of the church are lancet windows, the west window has two lights and the east window has three.
