= Listed buildings in Odd Rode =

Odd Rode is a civil parish in Cheshire East, England. It contains 35 buildings that are recorded in the National Heritage List for England as designated listed buildings. Of these, one is listed at Grade I, the highest grade, five are listed at Grade II*, the middle grade, and the others are at Grade II. The most important listed building in the parish is Little Moreton Hall; other notable country houses include Rode Hall and Ramsdell Hall. Most of the other listed buildings are houses, farmhouses, and associated structures. The Macclesfield and the Trent and Mersey Canals run through the parish, and the listed buildings associated with these are bridges, milestones, and distance markers. The other listed buildings are a church. a folly, wellheads, and a public house.

== Key ==
Grade	Criteria
I	Buildings of exceptional interest, sometimes considered to be internationally important
II*	Particularly important buildings of more than special interest
II	Buildings of national importance and special interest

== Buildings ==
=== Listed buildings ===
Name and location	Photograph	Date	Notes	Grade
Barn, Little Moreton Hall Farm; 53.12703°N 2.25075°W		15th century	The barn is timber-framed on a stone plinth, and is covered with clapboard. It has a tiled roof, and is in a single storey. In the centre is a double door, at the sides of which are three square pitch holes. At the ends are cruck beams.	II*
Little Moreton Hall; 53.12708°N 2.25180°W		1504–08	A moated country house built mainly in timber-framing with rendered infill and partly in brick. The house is in two and three storeys with a stone-slate roof, and consists of three ranges around a courtyard. It is the result of at least seven phases of building up to about 1610. The house is owned by the National Trust, and is designated as a scheduled monument.	I
Cottage behind Ramsdell Hall; 53.11976°N 2.23610°W	—	16th century	The cottage was originally timber-framed with wattle and daub and brick infill. There have been alterations and additions in the 17th, 18th and 20th centuries, some of which are in brick. The roof is in 20th-century cement tiles. The cottage has two storeys, and there are two lean-tos. Some windows are mullioned, and others are casements.	II
Ashbank Farmhouse; 53.10320°N 2.26895°W	—	Late 16th to early 17th century	The farmhouse is in two storeys with an attic, and it has a tiled roof. The earliest part is timber-framed with wattle and daub infill. On the right is a wing with a jettied gable containing casement windows, and to the left of this is a range containing a canted oriel window with moulded mullions. Further to the left is a 19th-century extension in rendered brick, and to the left of this is a 19th-century lean-to. Inside the farmhouse is an inglenook.	II*
Outbuilding, Little Moreton Hall Farm; 53.12734°N 2.25067°W		16th or 17th century	The farm building is timber-framed with wattle and daub infill and has a stone-slate roof. It was refaced in brick in the 19th century. On the farmyard front are two stable doors, nine windows, two loft doorways, and a gabled dormer containing another loft window.	II
The Cottage; 53.11924°N 2.28530°W	—	17th century	A timber-framed house with brick infill and a tiled roof. In the upper floor is a modern four-light flat-roofed dormer. On the right side of the house is a 20th-century brick lean-to. The lower part of the left wall is in brick, and the upper part is timber-framed.	II
Moor's Farmhouse; 53.12046°N 2.26300°W	—	17th century	The original part of the farmhouse, consisting of the right two bays, is in rendered timber-framing. The later part has a brick lower storey, and rendered timber-framing above. In this part the upper storey, and the gable are both jettied. The roof is tiled, and the windows are casements.	II
Pump House; 53.12203°N 2.26921°W	—	17th century	A timber-framed house with brick infill and a tiled roof. It has a complex plan, with projecting gabled wings, the wing at the front of the house being jettied with a chamfered bressumer. The windows are casements, and there is a massive chimney stack on the ridge.	II
Tudor Cottage; 53.11617°N 2.29677°W	—	17th century	A timber-framed house with a thatched roof in two storeys standing on a rendered plinth. On the entrance front is a 20th-century lean-to porch and an oriel window. All the windows date from the 20th century, and there is a large 20th-century extension at the rear.	II
Wood Cottage; 53.12326°N 2.21962°W		Mid- to late 17th century	A farmhouse that was extended in the 19th century. It is built in sandstone and has a slate roof. The house contains casement windows and has a gabled dormer. At the rear is a rendered plinth.	II
Holehouse Farmhouse; 53.11525°N 2.26217°W	—	Late 17th century	A brick farmhouse with a tiled roof, it is in three storeys and has a symmetrical three-bay front. There is a central doorway with a gabled porch. In each floor there are two camber-headed three-light casement windows. On the right side of the house is a staircase window, and on the left side is a lean-to cheese room.	II
Rode Hall; 53.11290°N 2.27207°W		c. 1700	The older part replaced an earlier timber-framed house. In 1752 an additional house was added to the left. The whole building is in brick with stone dressings and has a slate roof. The older part is in two storeys and has a seven-bay front. The later part is in 2 1/2 storeys, and has a five-bay front. The right bay of this links to the older part, and the other four bays are symmetrical. In front of the central two bays is an Ionic portico, the outer bays consisting of three-storey bow windows.	II*
Gate and gate piers, Ramsdell Hall; 53.11934°N 2.23508°W		Early 18th century	The gate piers are in sandstone. They are square and rusticated with projecting plinths and moulded tops, and are surmounted by trophies in Portland stone. The gates date from the later 18th century and are in wrought iron. Above them is an arched overthrow.	II
Ramsdell Hall; 53.11976°N 2.23644°W		Early to mid-18th century	A brick country house with stone dressings and a slate roof. There is a central three-storey block, flanked by single-storey wings, ending in two-storey pavilions. The central block is in three bays. The central bay contains Venetian windows in the lower two floors and a pediment at the top. The outer bays contain three-storey canted bay windows. A former stable block is included in the listing.	II*
Mow Cop Castle; 53.11315°N 2.21434°W		1754	This is a folly built as an eyecatcher from Rode Hall by Randle Wilbraham. It stands on an outcrop of rock, and is built in sandstone. The folly consists of a round tower with an attached wall containing an arch, all deliberately ruinous. There are round openings in the lower part of the tower, and in the wall.	II
Grotto, Rode Hall; 53.11280°N 2.27393°W		18th or 19th century	The grotto is in the garden of the hall. It consists of a brick-lined barrel vaulted tunnel surrounded by boulders. The interior is plastered and set with sea shells.	II
Icehouse, Rode Hall; 53.11169°N 2.27271°W	—	18th or 19th century	The icehouse is in the garden of the hall. It is built in brick and is covered in earth. A tunnel-vaulted passage leads into a circular chamber with a domed roof and a dished floor.	II
Obelisk, Rode Hall; 53.11433°N 2.27605°W		18th or 19th century	The obelisk is in the grounds of the hall, and is in sandstone. It stands on a square plinth, and is in two sections, the upper section being added at a later date. It was originally located at Kent Green.	II
Kent Green Farmhouse; 53.11409°N 2.24593°W	—	Late 18th to early 19th century	A brick farmhouse on a stone plinth with a slate roof, that was extended later in the 19th century. The original part is in three storeys with a symmetrical three-bay front. The central doorway has a pediment. The extension to the rear is a wing in two storeys. The windows are sashes.	II
Stable block, Rode Hall; 53.11254°N 2.27187°W	—	c. 1804	The stable block is in brick with stone dressings and a slate roof, and was designed by John Hope. It has a symmetrical front of six bays, the middle two bays projecting forward. These bays contain two carriage doorways with keystones, and above them is a pediment with a clock face. On top of this is an octagonal bellcote with a lead ogee dome. The windows at the lower level are round-headed, and those above are circular.	II
Canal milepost 53.10901°N 2.28768°W		1819	The milepost is on the Trent and Mersey Canal. It is in cast iron, and consists of a circular post with a moulded top carrying two convex panels inscribed with the distances in miles to Preston Brook and Shardlow.	II
Old House Farmhouse; 53.12103°N 2.23385°W	—	Early 19th century	A brick farmhouse with a rendered front and stone dressings. It is in two storeys, and has an entrance front of four bays, the three on the right being symmetrical. The central of these bays projects slightly forward and contains a porch with Corinthian columns. In the flanking bays are single-storey canted bay windows containing sashes. Above the porch is a French window opening on to the porch roof.	II
Icehouse, Old House Green; 53.12101°N 2.23576°W	—	Early 19th century (probable)	The icehouse has a sandstone face with brick behind, and is under an earth mound. At the entrance is a Gothick arch, above which is the statue of a female. A passage leads into a circular chamber with a brick domed roof.	II
Bridge No. 86; 53.12262°N 2.23477°W		c. 1827	An accommodation bridge over the Macclesfield Canal, for which the engineer was William Crosley. It is built in sandstone, and consists of a single horseshoe arch with voussoirs and keystones. There are curved retaining walls ending in square piers.	II
Bridge No. 87; 53.11461°N 2.24168°W		c. 1827	The bridge carries Station Road over the Macclesfield Canal, for which the engineer was William Crosley. It is built in sandstone, and consists of a single horseshoe arch with voussoirs and keystones. There are curved retaining walls ending in square piers.	II
Bridge No. 89; 53.11145°N 2.24597°W	—	c. 1827	An accommodation bridge over the Macclesfield Canal, for which the engineer was William Crosley. It is built in sandstone, and consists of a single horseshoe arch with voussoirs and keystones. There are curved retaining walls ending in square piers.	II
Bridge No. 91; 53.10711°N 2.24775°W	—	c. 1827	The bridge carries Portland Drive over the Macclesfield Canal, for which the engineer was William Crosley. It is built in sandstone, and consists of a single horseshoe arch with voussoirs and keystones. There are curved retaining walls ending in square piers.	II
Canal milestone 53.10372°N 2.24830°W	—	c. 1827	The milestone by the Macclesfield Canal is in sandstone. It consists of a rectangular stone with an arched top. It is inscribed with the distances in miles to Hall Green and to Marple.	II
Canal distance marker 53.10752°N 2.24784°W		c. 1830	The distance marker on the Macclesfield Canal. It is in sandstone and has a shaped top. The south face is inscribed with "1/2".	II
Canal milestone 53.11672°N 2.23974°W		c. 1830	The milestone by the Macclesfield Canal is in sandstone and has a shaped top. It is inscribed with the distances in miles to Hall Green and to Marple.	II
Wellhead	—	Mid-19th century	The wellhead is in sandstone and is set in a roadside wall. It has an arched top and a raised lip.	II
Parson's Well; 53.11104°N 2.21742°W		1858	A well head set into a wall. It is in sandstone and consists of an arch formed by two slabs. There are inscriptions on the left side and above the well.	II
Squire's Well; 53.11386°N 2.21549°W	—	1862	A well head set into a wall. It is in sandstone and consists of an arch formed by two inscribed slabs. Above the arch is another inscribed stone.	II
All Saints Church; 53.11424°N 2.26452°W		1863–64	The church was designed by George Gilbert Scott, and is built in stone with a tiled roof. It consists of a nave, a south aisle, a southwest porch, and a northeast vestry. At the west end is a bellcote, below which is a canopied niche containing a statue of Christ.	II*
Bleeding Wolf Public House; 53.10215°N 2.25198°W		1936	The public house was designed by J. H. Walters in Vernacular Revival style. It is built in rendered brick with some weatherboarding, and has a thatched roof. The public house is in two storeys and has a two-storey bow window to the left of centre that is flanked by doors. Many of the internal features have survived.	II

=== Buildings of local architectural interest ===
Although the following buildings are not on the Register, in 2011 as part of the Odd Rode Village Design Statement they were deemed to be of local architectural interest.

==== Rode Heath ====
Name and location	Photograph	Date	Notes
232–234 Sandbach Rd, 53.1098°N 2.28845°W	—	—	Pair of semi-detached cottages
Bibby Street; 53.1131°N 2.2937°W		—	Terrace of cottages

==== Scholar Green ====
Name and location	Photograph	Date	Notes
Holehouse Lane; 53.1174°N 2.2681°W	—	—	Pair of semi-detached estate cottages
