= Hammerton (surname) =

Hammerton is an English surname. Notable people with the surname include:

- Dorothy Fay Hammerton (1893–1973), birth name of British actress Fay Holden
- Ernie Hammerton (1927–1991), Australian rugby league footballer
- John Alexander Hammerton (1871–1949), British creator of large-scale works of reference
- John Hammerton (footballer) (1900–1978), English footballer
- Stephen Hammerton (1629–1647), boy player or child actor in English Renaissance theatre

== See also ==
- Hammerton (disambiguation)
