= Listed buildings in Green Hammerton =

Green Hammerton is a civil parish in the county of North Yorkshire, England. It contains eleven listed buildings that are recorded in the National Heritage List for England. All the listed buildings are designated at Grade II, the lowest of the three grades, which is applied to "buildings of national importance and special interest". The parish contains the village of Green Hammerton and the surrounding area. Most of the listed buildings are houses, and the others are a bridge and a chapel of ease.

== Buildings ==
Name and location	Photograph	Date	Notes
Green Farmhouse and wall 54.00706°N 1.30091°W		Mid 18th century	The house is in red brick, with a string course, and a pantile roof with two courses of stone slates and stone coping. There are two storeys and three bays. The central doorway has a plain surround, and the windows are sashes. The front garden wall is in brick with stone coping, and is ramped up at each end.
Jasmine Cottage and house to the left 54.00668°N 1.30119°W		Mid 18th century	A pair of red brick houses, with a moulded string course, cogged eaves, and a pantile roof with tumbled brickwork in the gables. There are two storeys and each house has three bays. On the front are two doorways, and the windows are sshes in flush architraves.
Low Royd; 54.00829°N 1.30057°W		Mid 18th century	The house is in red brick, with a stepped string course, an eaves cornice, and a pantile roof with two courses of stone slate. There are two storeys and four bays. On the front is a blocked doorway, the ground floor windows are 20th-century replacements, and in the upper floor are horizontally-sliding sash windows with flat brick arches and brick sills.
High Farm House and railings 54.00556°N 1.30175°W		Late 18th century	The house is in roughcast brick, with a string course, a dentilled eaves cornice, and a pantile roof with brick copings and stone kneelers. There are two storeys and three bays, and a later parallel range at the rear. The central doorway has pilasters, a fanlight, and an open pediment with a panelled soffit. The windows are sashes in architraves with stone sills. Enclosing the semicircular forefront are iron railings with pointed bars, and the gate has thicker iron piers with bulbous finials.
Plum Cottage, wall, railings and gate 54.00649°N 1.30135°W		Late 18th century	The house is in red brick, with a cobbled foundation course, a brick plinth, a string course, a dentilled eaves cornice, and a pantile roof with two courses of stone slates. There are two storeys and three bays. In the centre is a doorway with a plain surround and a cornice, flanked by segmental bow windows, and the upper floor contains sash windows in architraves. The front garden wall is in brick with stone capping and iron railings. It contains a gate, and iron gate piers with ball finials.
Post Office and two houses 54.00514°N 1.30118°W		Late 18th century	A row of three houses, the middle one containing a post office and shop. They are in rendered brick, with a string course, a dentilled eaves cornice, and a pantile roof with raised verges and stone coping on the left. There are two storeys and six bays, the right two bays lower. On the front are three doorways, each with fluted pilasters, an entablature, a cornice, and a fanlight, the middle one blocked. Flanking the middle doorway are bow windows, and the other windows are sashes in architraves.
Providence House; 54.00191°N 1.32033°W	—	c. 1780	The house is in red brick, with painted floor bands, and a hipped stone slate roof. There are three storeys and three bays. The central doorway has a fanlight, and a lintel with a keystone. This is flanked by canted bay windows, and the other windows are sashes with incised lintels, keystones and stone sills. On the front is a fire insurance plaque, and another inscribed plaque. To the left is a lower two-storey range with horizontally-sliding sash windows.
Hall Farm House; 54.00786°N 1.30009°W		Early 19th century	The house is in rendered brick, with stone sills, a moulded eaves cornice, and a hipped M-shaped Westmorland slate roof. There are two storeys, a double depth plan, and three bays, and a lower two-storey wing on the right. In the centre is a doorway in an architrave with paterae, and the windows are sashes.
Skip Bridge; 53.99765°N 1.26572°W		Early 19th century	The bridge carries the old York Road over the River Nidd. It is in stone, and consists of three round arches with rounded cutwaters, and two piers carried up as pedestrian refuges. The bridge has square pilasters, a projecting band, and a parapet with shallow pointed coping.
Stamford House and railings 54.00628°N 1.30137°W		Early to mid 19th century	The house is in cream and brown brick with a blue slate roof. There are two storeys, a double depth plan, and three bays. The central doorway has a plain surround and a narrow cornice, and the windows as sashes. In front is a low brick wall with stone coping and iron railings. It contains cast iron gate piers with open-work flower and scroll motifs.
St Thomas' Chapel; 54.00418°N 1.29966°W		1874–76	The chapel of ease, designed by George Gilbert Scott, is in stone with a red tile roof. It has a cruciform plan, consisting of a nave and a chancel, transepts, an organ chantry and a porch. Between the nave and the chancel is a bellcote containing two bells.
