= St John the Baptist Church, Kirk Hammerton =

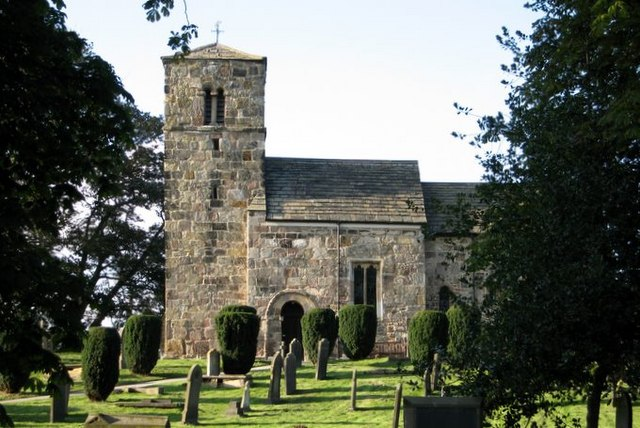
- St John the Baptist Church, Kirk Hammerton
- St John the Baptist Church, Kirk Hammerton
- 53.99356°N 1.29190°W
- OS grid reference: SE 46524 55525
- Location: Kirk Hammerton, North Yorkshire
- Country: England
- Denomination: Church of England

History
- Status: Parish church
- Dedication: John the Baptist

Architecture
- Functional status: Active
- Heritage designation: Grade I
- Architectural type: Church
- Style: Saxon Norman, Gothic Revival
- Groundbreaking: approx 950 AD

Administration
- Province: York
- Diocese: Leeds
- Archdeaconry: Richmond & Craven
- Deanery: Ripon
- Parish: Parish of Lower Nidderdale

Clergy
- Vicar: Rev'd Siân Lawton

St John the Baptist Church, Kirk Hammerton is a Grade I listed Church of England church located in the village of Kirk Hammerton, North Yorkshire, England. It is notable for its complete, mid tenth century Anglo-Saxon tower, and parts of the 9th century church (the original Anglo-Saxon chancel and nave) which now form the south aisle of the present church, the remainder of which dates from later periods (Norman and beyond). It lies within the Diocese of Leeds in the Lower Nidderdale Parish. The church has links with Kirk Hammerton Church of England Primary School in the village.

== History ==
The church is Anglo-Saxon in origin and was originally dedicated to St Quentin.

The Saxon part of the church, which now forms the Lady Chapel, is believed to have been built in the 9th century, with the tower being added around 950 AD. This older section was largely constructed from blocks of millstone grit taken from the ruins of the Roman city of Eboracum.

Alterations were carried out around 1150 and 1834. In 1892 the building was significantly extended, the work being undertaken by Mr H. Fowler of Durham on behalf of the then Lord of the Manor, E. W. Stanyforth. The church was listed Grade I in 1966.

== Architecture ==
Owing to the alterations and extensions there is mixture of architectural styles and effects within the interior. The walls of the south aisle are whitewashed, whereas the north aisle is bare stone. Both arcades are also of varying styles and height. The vaulting is timber. The interior is richly decorated in a Pre-Raphaelite style that was added at the time of the Victorian extension. The door to the chapel is of Saxon origin and there is evidence of another doorway that has been filled. The west door is Saxon in origin, but the south door has had the right side restored, though the remainder is Saxon. The font dates from the reign of King Charles II. Some of the stained glass windows were made by Charles Kempe.

=== South Chapel ===
There is a mix of styles in the chapel as demonstrated by the small but deep-set lancet windows, which are Early English, compared with the large Norman window, which is dated around 1150. There are also a sedilia and a piscina on one of the walls.

=== Tower ===
The square tower on the south side of the church remains largely as built around 950 AD. There are two sets of mullioned windows on each side (except the east), one above the other, below the stone coursing that marks the belfry. There are two bells in the belfry and the roof is a shallow pyramid.

== Churchyard ==
The church lies atop a small mound at the junction of Chapel Street, Church Street and Old Church Green. The boundary is made of brick with two entrances and contains many established trees. The boundary on Church Street is not gated, whereas the entrance on Chapel Street has a lychgate. Amongst the graves in the churchyard are those of village men who died during the nearby Battle of Marston Moor. There are approximately 166 marked graves listing 367 names in the churchyard.

== See also ==
- Grade I listed buildings in North Yorkshire (district)
- Listed buildings in Kirk Hammerton
