= St John the Evangelist's Church, Cadeby =

Coordinates: 53.4989°N 1.2254°W

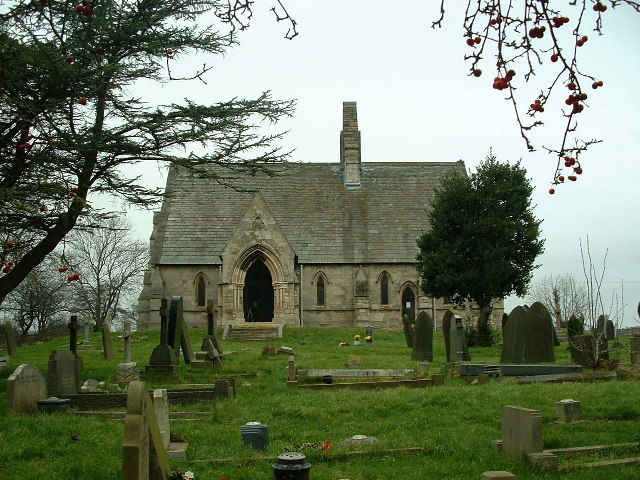
- St John the Evangelist's Church, Cadeby, from the south

- Location in South Yorkshire
- OS grid reference: SE 514 005
- Location: Cadeby, South Yorkshire
- Country: England
- Denomination: Anglican
- Website: Churches Conservation Trust

History
- Founder: Sir Joseph Copley
- Dedication: John the Evangelist
- Consecrated: 25 September 1860

Architecture
- Functional status: Redundant
- Heritage designation: Grade II
- Designated: 5 June 1968
- Architect: Sir George Gilbert Scott
- Architectural type: Church
- Style: Gothic Revival
- Completed: 1856
- Construction cost: £6,000

Specifications
- Materials: Magnesian Limestone, slate roof

St John the Evangelist's Church is a redundant Anglican church in the village of Cadeby, South Yorkshire, England. It is recorded in the National Heritage List for England as a designated Grade II listed building, and is under the care of the Churches Conservation Trust. Victoria Cross recipient George Harry Wyatt is buried there.

== History ==
The church was built in 1856 for Sir Joseph Copley and was designed by Sir George Gilbert Scott. The church cost £6,000 (equivalent to £559,000 in 2025),and was consecrated on 25 September 1860. St John's was declared redundant on 1 March 1990, and was vested in the Trust on 26 June 1991.

== Architecture ==
St John's is constructed in ashlar Magnesian Limestone, and has a graduated slate roof. Its plan consists of three-bay nave and a two-bay chancel, with north and south aisles and chapels constituting a single cell. It has a gabled south porch, and is in Gothic Revival style. On the roof between the nave and chancel is bellcote. Along the sides are lancet windows, while the west window has two lights and the east window three lights. Inside the church the arcades are carried on circular piers with capitals carved with naturalistic foliage. Most of the original fittings are still in the church, including an octagonal font and a wooden pulpit. The internal carvings of the church were carried out by J. Birnie Philip.

== See also ==
- List of new churches by George Gilbert Scott in Northern England
- List of churches preserved by the Churches Conservation Trust in Northern England
- Listed buildings in Cadeby, South Yorkshire
