= Hammertown =

Hammertown may refer to:

- A nickname for the Canadian city of Hamilton, Ontario
- Hammertown, Ontario, Canada, a community in the township of King
- Hammertown, New York, USA, on county road 83 in Dutchess County
- A town setup for the King of the Hammers race in Johnson Valley, California

== See also ==
- Hammerton (disambiguation)
