= The Bleeding Wolf, Scholar Green =

Bleeding Wolf Public House
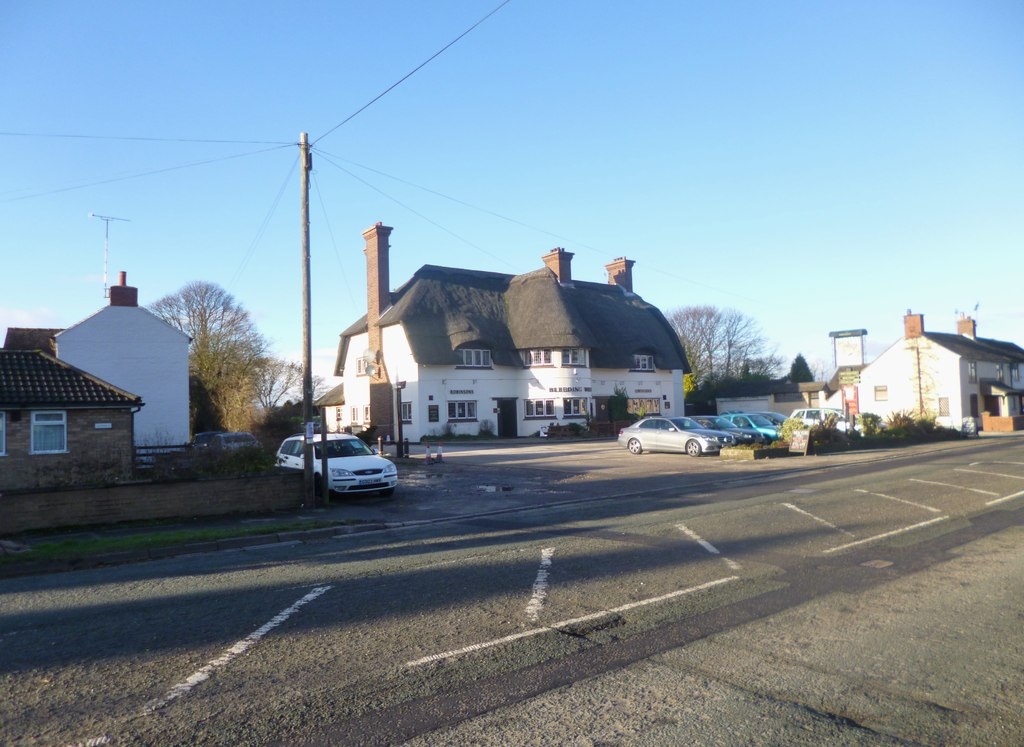
- The Bleeding Wolf Public House

- Location within Cheshire
- 53.101921°N 2.251400°W

History
- Built: 1934
- Built for: Robinson's Brewery

Site notes
- Architect: J H Walters

Listed Building – Grade II
- Official name: 121 Congleton Road North, Odd Rode, Cheshire East
- Designated: 21 November 2011
- Reference no.: 1400540

The Bleeding Wolf is a Grade II listed public house at 121 Congleton Road North, Scholar Green, Cheshire ST7 3BQ. The unusual name is said to arise from a legend in which King John rewards a local forester for saving him from a wolf.

It is on the Campaign for Real Ale's National Inventory of Historic Pub Interiors.

The pub was designed in vernacular revival style and was built in 1936 for Robinson's Brewery of Stockport, replacing an earlier pub on the site. It was provided with a car park.

== See also ==
- Listed buildings in Odd Rode
