= Scholar Green =

Village in Cheshire, England

Coordinates: 53.10936°N 2.25289°W

- Location within Cheshire
- Civil parish: Odd Rode
- Unitary authority: Cheshire East
- Ceremonial county: Cheshire
- Region: North West
- Country: England
- Sovereign state: United Kingdom
- Post town: Stoke-on-Trent
- Postcode district: ST7
- Dialling code: 01782
- Police: Cheshire
- Fire: Cheshire
- Ambulance: North West
- UK Parliament: Congleton

Scholar Green (/ˈskɒlə ɡriːn/) is a village in the civil parish of Odd Rode, in Cheshire, England. Encompassing the smaller settlements of Kent Green and The Bank, it is situated on the A34 near Mow Cop, Alsager, Rode Heath, Butt Lane and Kidsgrove and in the unitary authority area of Cheshire East.

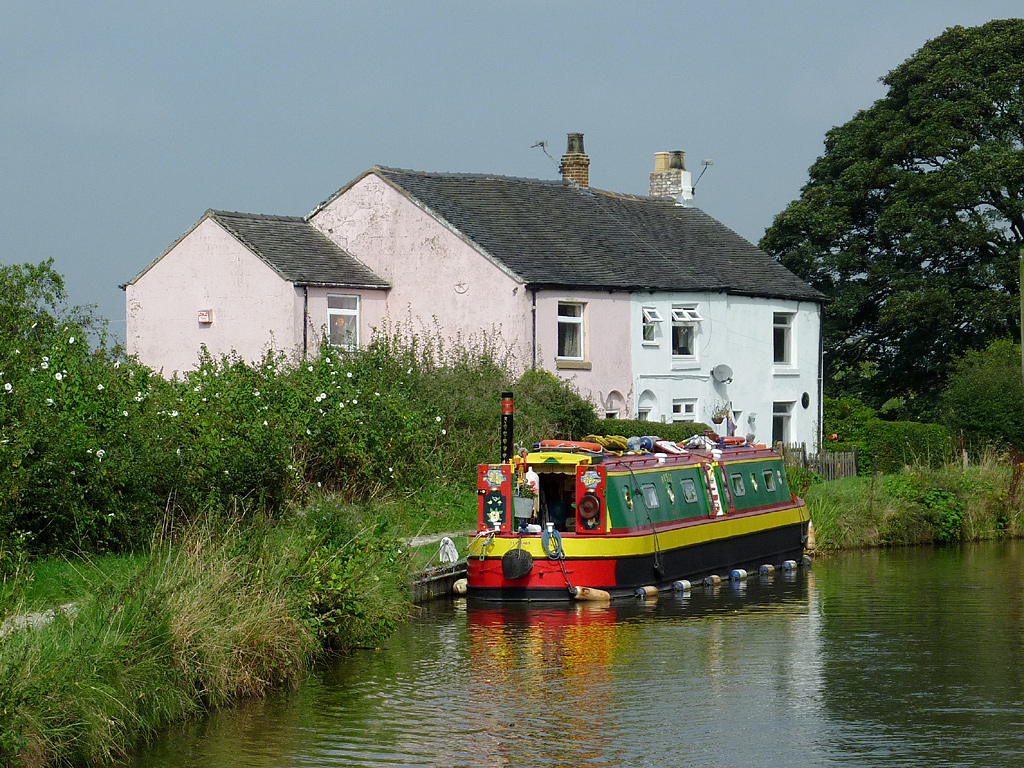
The Macclesfield Canal at Scholar Green

Scholar Green has a long history, as shown by the number and range of listed buildings in and around the village. Little Moreton Hall, a Grade I listed moated timber-framed house, is located a mile north of the village. Other listed buildings include the 18th-century Rode Hall and All Saints Church, built between 1863 and 1864 and designed by George Gilbert Scott. The Macclesfield Canal runs through Scholar Green, and the Trent and Mersey Canal is nearby.

The population is served by three public houses: "The Rising Sun", "The Bleeding Wolf" and "The Traveller's Rest". The village is also served by All Saints Church, Scholar Green, by the Bank Methodist Church and by Scholar Green Primary School.

Mow Cop and Scholar Green railway station on the line between Manchester and Stafford was situated to the north-east of the village. It opened in 1848 and was closed in 1964.

== Notable people ==
- George Clawley (1875 in Scholar Green – 1920), an English professional goalkeeper who played for Stoke City, Southampton and Tottenham Hotspur. He made 331 professional appearances and was the goalkeeper for the Spurs side that won the 1901 FA Cup Final.
