= Rode Heath =

Village in Cheshire, England

Coordinates: 53.112933°N 2.290755°W

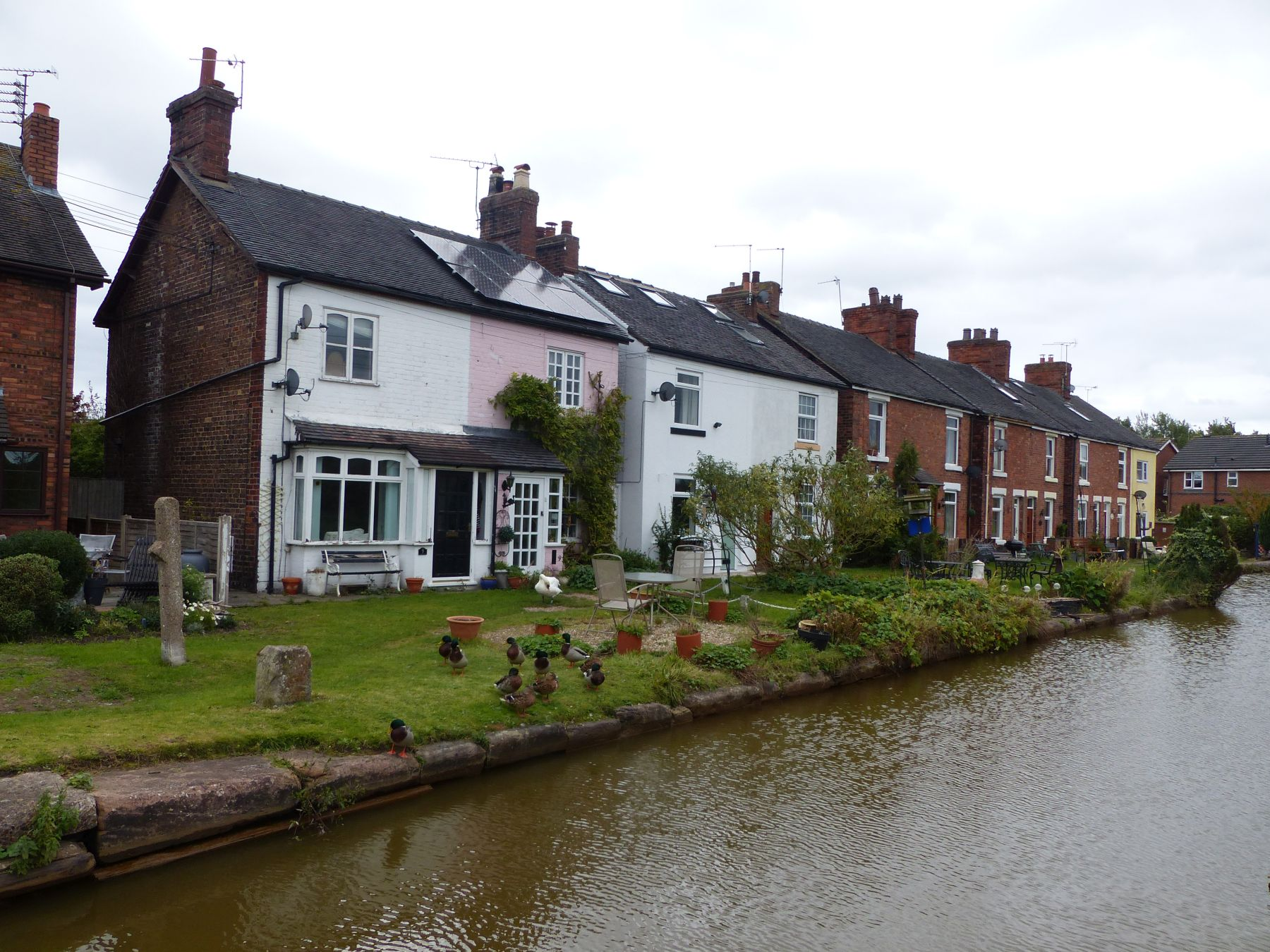
- Cottages along the Trent and Mersey Canal

- Location within Cheshire
- Population: 2,150
- OS grid reference: SJ806573
- Civil parish: Odd Rode
- Unitary authority: Cheshire East
- Ceremonial county: Cheshire
- Region: North West
- Country: England
- Sovereign state: United Kingdom
- Post town: Stoke-on-Trent
- Postcode district: ST7
- Dialling code: 01270
- Police: Cheshire
- Fire: Cheshire
- Ambulance: North West
- UK Parliament: Congleton

Rode Heath is a small village in the civil parish of Odd Rode, near Alsager and within the unitary authority of Cheshire East and the ceremonial county of Cheshire, England. According to the 2001 census, Rode Heath had a population of 2,150. In the 2011 census the figure had dropped to 2,019 and a 2016 estimate put the population at 1,943. The village was previously two villages, Rode Heath and Thurlwood. Since extensive housing developments in Thurlwood the two are known simply as Rode Heath.

The Trent and Mersey Canal runs through Rode Heath. The village has two pubs, a primary school, post office, shop and Chinese takeaway. There are two churches: the Church of the Good Shepherd, one of the three churches that make up the Parish of Odd Rode, and the Rhema Mission Church (Rode Heath Chapel). Close by is Rode Hall, the gardens of which are a tourist attraction. The current owner of Rode Hall is Lady Wilbraham.

The village has a number of gentle walks along the canal and through the countryside, popular with dog walkers.

== History ==
There was a salt works at Rode Heath run by James Sutton (1799–1868), who was also a canal boat carrier and High Sheriff of Derbyshire. In the past, Rode Heath and Thurlwood were separate settlements. From 1864 to 1962 there was a Primitive Methodist Chapel in Thurlwood. Many of the original inhabitants of Thurlwood were canal-boat families and some of the older houses, such as those in Faram's Road, had stables for the horses that towed the boats. Rode Heath and Thurlwood are now effectively joined, although the major 'link' and where you can see the end of one village lies on the southernmost lock.
