= St Thomas' Church, Green Hammerton =

Chapel in Green Hammerton, North Yorkshire, England

Coordinates: 54°00′15″N 1°17′59″W

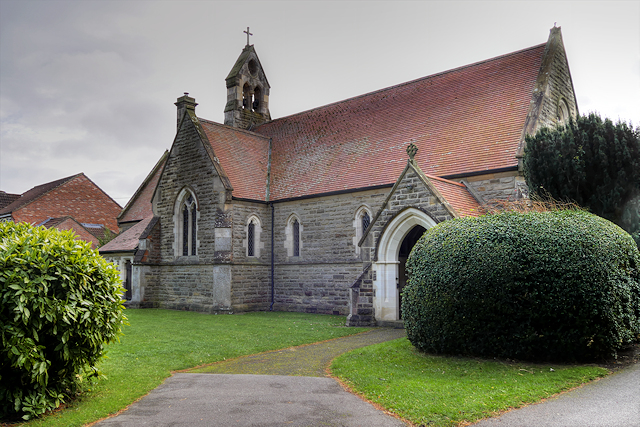
The church, in 2017

St Thomas' Church is an Anglican church in Green Hammerton, a village in North Yorkshire, in England.

The church was designed by George Gilbert Scott as a chapel of ease to the Church of the Ascension, Whixley and was completed in 1876. The village did not previously have an Anglican church, and the construction costs of between £2,000 and £3,000 were funded by donations, co-ordinated by a Mrs Valentine, wife of the vicar of Whixley. It was designed to accommodate 130 worshippers. An organ chantry was added in 1899. One of the smallest of Gilbert Scott's churches, it is criticised by David Cole, who writes that "the heart does not warm to it", although Historic England states that "the quality of the architecture is high, as is the level of artistic achievement". It was grade II listed in 2008.

The church is built of pitch-faced stone with a red tile roof. It has a cruciform plan, consisting of a nave and a chancel, transepts, an organ chantry and a porch. Between the nave and the chancel is a bellcote containing two bells. It has stained windows with glass by Clayton and Bell and James Powell and Sons. Inside, there is a wooden reredos dating from 1934, and a marble font.

== See also ==
- Listed buildings in Green Hammerton
