= Kirk Hammerton =

Village and civil parish in North Yorkshire, England

Coordinates: 53.9946°N 1.2903°W

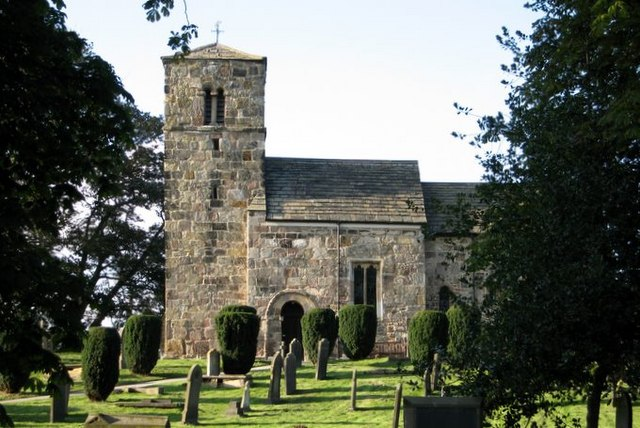
- Saint John the Baptist parish church

- Location within North Yorkshire
- Population: 538 (2011 Census)
- OS grid reference: SE466556
- Civil parish: Kirk Hammerton
- Unitary authority: North Yorkshire
- Ceremonial county: North Yorkshire
- Region: Yorkshire and the Humber
- Country: England
- Sovereign state: United Kingdom
- Post town: YORK
- Postcode district: YO26
- Police: North Yorkshire
- Fire: North Yorkshire
- Ambulance: Yorkshire
- UK Parliament: Wetherby and Easingwold

Kirk Hammerton is a village and civil parish in the county of North Yorkshire, England. It is near the River Nidd and the A59 road, 10 miles (16 km) west of York. The village suffix refers to the Hamerton family who owned the land until the 16th century.

Until 1974 it was part of the West Riding of Yorkshire. From 1974 to 2023 it was part of the Borough of Harrogate and is now administered by the unitary North Yorkshire Council.

== History ==
(H)ambretone, a place-name reflected now in both Kirk Hammerton ("Hammerton with the church", from the Old Norse kirkja = "church") and Green Hammerton ("Hammerton with the green", from Middle English grene), is first attested in Domesday Book of 1086. The name seems to derive from the Old English plant-name hamor (the meaning of which is not certain but may include hammer-sedge or pellitory of the wall) + tūn 'settlement, farm, estate'. The course of Rudgate, a Roman road, passes the village.

The lands of the parish used to be held by the Hamerton family of Hellifield Peel Castle, part of their estate stretching from Slaidburn to York. Sir Stephen Hamerton was executed for treason at Tyburn in 1536 for participating in the Pilgrimage of Grace. Being of knightly rank, Sir Stephen was hanged and beheaded but not drawn and quartered, nor were his lands seized by the crown. His son Henry died on 3 August 1537 and was buried in York Minster. Joan, the widow of Henry, died on 3 January 1538, leaving two infant children; Elizabeth, the widow of Sir Stephen, died on 3 May 1538, and was buried at Slaidburn. The Hellifield estates were held by the Crown until 1546, when they were granted out to George Brown, Esq., to be held by the King, in capita, for the sum of £292-9-2. In 1553 Sir Arthur Darcy, knight, bought the manor of Hellified, 12 messuages and a watermill from George Brown and his wife. In 1556-7 the property passed into the hands of Anthony Watson and John Redman, both of whom were connected with the Hamertons by marriage. After much legal procedure the Hellifield estates were alienated in 1561, and following a fine levied at Westminster, they were returned to the Hamertons in the person of John Hamerton, Esq., nephew of Sir Stephen. The village and nearby Green Hammerton still bear their name.

On 6 July 2014 Stage 2 of the 2014 Tour de France, from York to Sheffield, passed through the village.

== Geography ==
The 2001 Census recorded a parish population of 517 people in 195 households. The village is mostly south of the A59 York – Liverpool road between York and Knaresborough. The River Nidd meanders to the south and east of the village. The parish also includes the small hamlet of Wilstrop.

The parish is served by Hammerton railway station on the Harrogate Line, which links York and Leeds. Cattal railway station is also within the parish boundary. Kirk Hammerton is 10 miles (16 km) west of York, 1 mile (1.6 km) south of Green Hammerton and 7 miles (11 km) east of Knaresborough. The parish has an area of 2,008 acres (813 ha).

== Governance ==
The parish is in the Wetherby and Easingwold parliamentary constituency.

The village Parish Council has six members.

== Education ==
The village has one primary school, Kirk Hammerton Church of England Primary School and a playgroup in the grounds of the school. Most pupils go on to get their secondary education at Boroughbridge High School.

== Religion ==
The Church of England parish church of St John the Baptist was originally dedicated to Saint Quentin. The original Anglo-Saxon church is on the south side of the church and now forms the Lady Chapel following a major enlargement of the building in 1892. The interior of the church is richly decorated in the pre-Raphaelite style, the decorations being added at the time of the Victorian extension to the building.

There is also a Wesleyan chapel, which was established in 1821 and moved to a larger building in 1899.

== See also ==
- Listed buildings in Kirk Hammerton
