= Cadeby Main Colliery =

Coal mine in South Yorkshire, England

Coordinates: 53°29′24″N 1°13′40″W

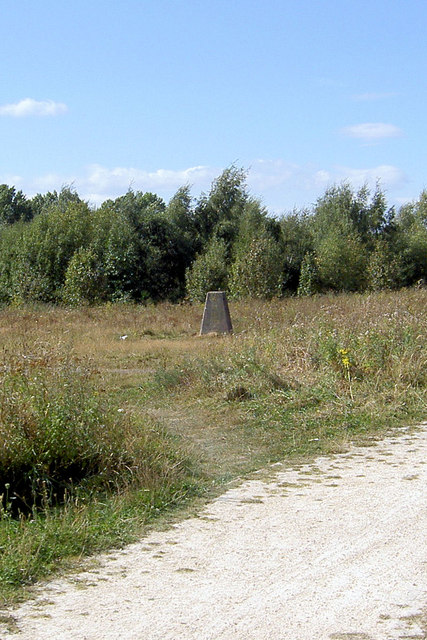
Marker at the site of the former mine

The Cadeby Main Colliery was a coal mine sunk in 1889 in Cadeby, South Yorkshire, England. It commenced production in 1893 and was worked until it was exhausted in 1986.

== Cadeby Main pit disaster ==
On 9 July 1912 there was a major pit disaster at Cadeby Main Colliery. 35 miners died in the first explosion. However a further 53 died in a second explosion which affected the rescue team. 3 more miners died subsequently as a result of their injuries.
