= Rode Hall =

English country house in Cheshire, England

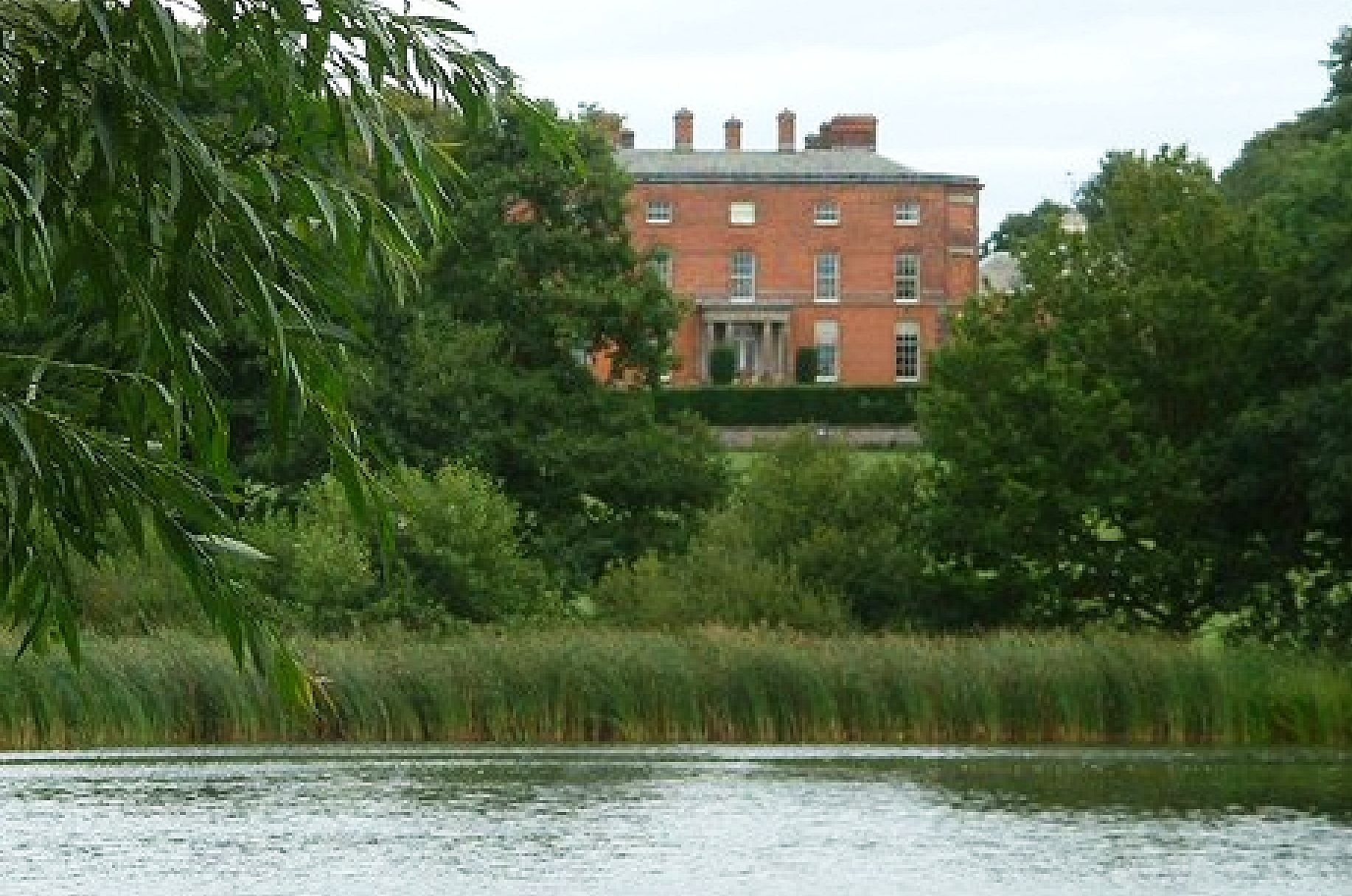
- The hall, from the north west, across Rode Pool

- Location in Cheshire
- 53.112896°N 2.272006°W
- Location: Odd Rode, Cheshire, near Stoke-on-Trent, England
- OS grid reference: SJ 81890 57336

History
- Built: c.1700 (original house); 1752 (extension)
- Built for: Randle Wilbraham; Randle Wilbraham III

Site notes
- Architect(s): Hiorne brothers (1752 extension); Lewis Wyatt (interiors)

Listed Building – Grade II*
- Designated: 6 June 1952
- Reference no.: 1138746

Rode Hall, a Georgian country house, is the seat of the Wilbraham family, members of the landed gentry in the parish of Odd Rode, Cheshire, England. The estate, with the original timber-framed manor house, was purchased by the Wilbrahams from a cousin, Randle Rode in 1669. The medieval manor house was replaced between 1700 and 1708 by a brick-built seven-bay building; a second building, with five bays, was built in 1752; the two buildings being joined in 1800 to form the present Rode Hall.

Both the exterior and interior of Rode Hall have been altered multiples times, including work by Thomas Farnolls Pritchard and Lewis Wyatt, resulting in an irregular and complex layout. The house has large collections of period paintings, furniture, and porcelain by Chelsea, Bow and Royal Worcester.

The house is Grade II* listed, and is surrounded by parkland and formal gardens, which are included as Grade II on the National Register of Historic Parks and Gardens. On the site are a grotto, an ice house, and an ornamental obelisk, all Grade II listed structures. Rode Hall is still owned and occupied by the Wilbrahams, currently by the 9th Baronet, Sir Randle Baker Wilbraham. The hall and gardens are open to the public from April to September.

== History ==
The Rode Estate had been owned by the Rode family since at least the 14th century, when William de Rode bore arms for Edward II. The estate was purchased in 1669 by Roger Wilbraham for the sum of £2,400 (equivalent to £330,000 in 2015), from his cousin Randle Rode. The Wilbrahams were prominent local landowners and descended from Sir Richard de Wilburgham, the Sheriff of Cheshire in the mid 13th century. The estate passed through the male line until 1900 when General Sir Richard Wilbraham died, leaving it to his only daughter Katherine. Katherine's husband, George Baker, assumed by royal licence the surname Wilbraham. In 1910, George succeeded to the Baker baronetcy on the death of his elder brother.

Rode Hall consists of two houses, formerly separate, but later joined. The older house was built for Randle Wilbraham in the early 18th century; it was recorded as being "recently completed" in 1708 and replaced an earlier timber-framed manor house, thought to have been similar to the nearby Little Moreton Hall. The second house was built for his grandson Randle Wilbraham III, a noted barrister, in 1752. The hall has been updated by successive generations, most notably in the early 1800s, when a bay was constructed to join the two houses, and in 1927, when the front portico was added. Rode Hall was opened to the public in 1980, by Sir Randle John Baker Wilbraham, 7th Baronet. Since then an extensive restoration has been performed with the assistance of English Heritage, including tackling an outbreak of dry rot in the late 1980s. In 1985, the house was designated Grade II* by English Heritage on the Register of Historic Parks and Gardens of special historic interest in England; Grade II* buildings are particularly important buildings of more than special interest. Only 5.5% of listed buildings are Grade II*.

== Architecture ==
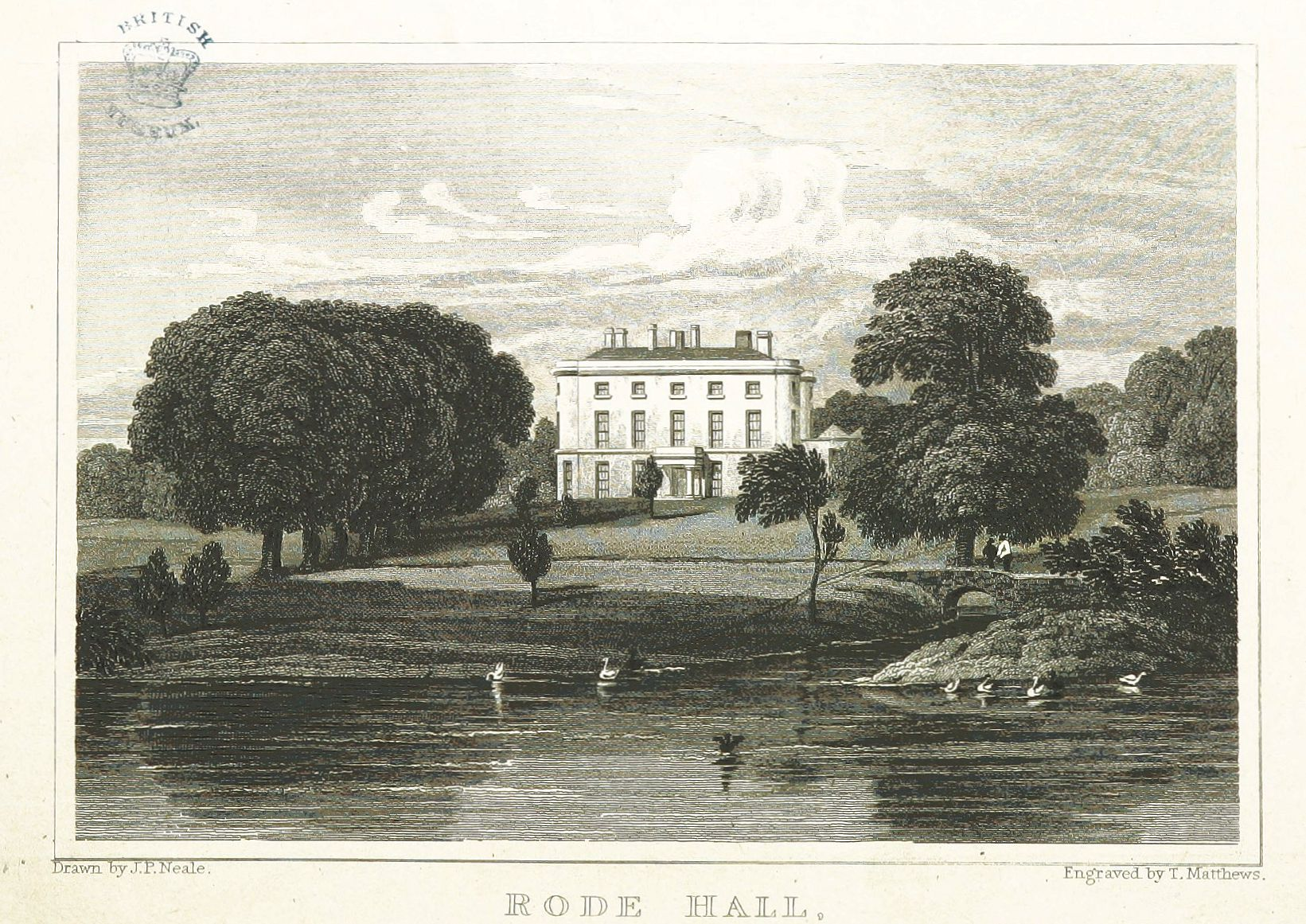
An 1824 engraving of Rode Hall, taken from Views of the Seats, Mansions, Castles, Etc. of Noblemen and Gentlemen of England, Scotland and Ireland by John Preston Neale

=== Exterior ===
The older part of the brick-built hall consists of seven bays, over two floors. There are projecting bays at either end of the building, dressed with ashlar quoins. A central doorway is flanked with plain pilasters, also of ashlar. The roof is of a hipped design, with a central octagonal bellcote, topped by a small dome.

The newer building, constructed in 1752 under the guidance of architects William Hiorne and his brother David, consists of five bays, with a large bay at the side, constructed around 1800 to connect it to the older building. There is a central portico, with a flat roof supported by four ionic columns, added in 1927. The tripartite windows of the ground floor contrast with the French windows of the first floor, which are fronted by cast iron balconies. The attic floor has small 4 x 2 pane windows. The rear of the house consists of four bays, with a large central window on the first floor and a central door, surrounded with ashlar cornicing. Both sections of the house are constructed in red Flemish bond brick, which, until 1926, was covered with render.

The design has received mixed reviews. Architectural historian David Watkin described the house as 'large, irregular and rather featureless' and of a 'dull design'. On the other hand, historian, archivist and Maltravers Herald Extraordinary John Martin Robinson, in The architecture of Northern England, noted the 'complex building history' of the hall, describing it as a 'substantial and elegant Georgian house'. In his early 19th-century work Views of the Seats, Mansions, Castles, Etc. of Noblemen and Gentlemen of England, Scotland and Ireland, John Preston Neale noted that the house is 'large and handsome'.

=== Interior ===
The main family living quarters are in the 1752 addition. The staircase hall is the only room in the 1752 house to have kept its original, Georgian interior. The rococo plaster ceiling is attributed to Shrewsbury-born architect, Thomas Farnolls Pritchard, who also designed interiors at Tatton Hall, Powis Castle and Croft Castle. Facing the gardens, on the north side of the house, is the library. Remodelled in the early 1800s, this room was previously used by the family as a dining room. It features fitted 19th-century mahogany bookcases, decorated with small acanthus friezes. The white marble fireplace is flanked on either side by family coats of arms. Connecting the library to the staircase hall and the drawing room is the ante-room, which is furnished with pieces commissioned by the family in the late 18th century. Originally, an entrance into the hall was in this octagonal room, until Randle Wilbraham III relocated it. The room features copies of works by Raphael, attributed to Michelangelo Maestri.

The dining room, originally the library, was designed by Lewis Wyatt in about 1808. Wyatt extended the room and added a shallow, semi-circular apse at one end. It features decorative plasterwork on both the ceiling and walls, but is largely unadorned. Wyatt implemented a design featuring gilded acanthus leaves and vines on the ceiling with large-scale egg-and-dart molding around the upper sections of the wall, scagliola columns and a black marble fireplace with bronze ornamentation. Wyatt's alteration works at Rode Hall are influenced by the style of Sir John Soane, and he described his designs for the interiors as an 'experiment in primitive simplicity ... At Rode the primitivist intent is emphasized by the total absence of an entablature.' The room is furnished with original pieces of furniture designed and made by the English manufacturer Gillows of Lancaster and London; of note is the mahogany dining-table and the semi-circular sideboard built into the apse. A Royal Crown Derby dinner service, purchased by Mary Wilbraham-Bootle for her son Randle Wilbraham III in 1809, is on display here.

== Grounds ==
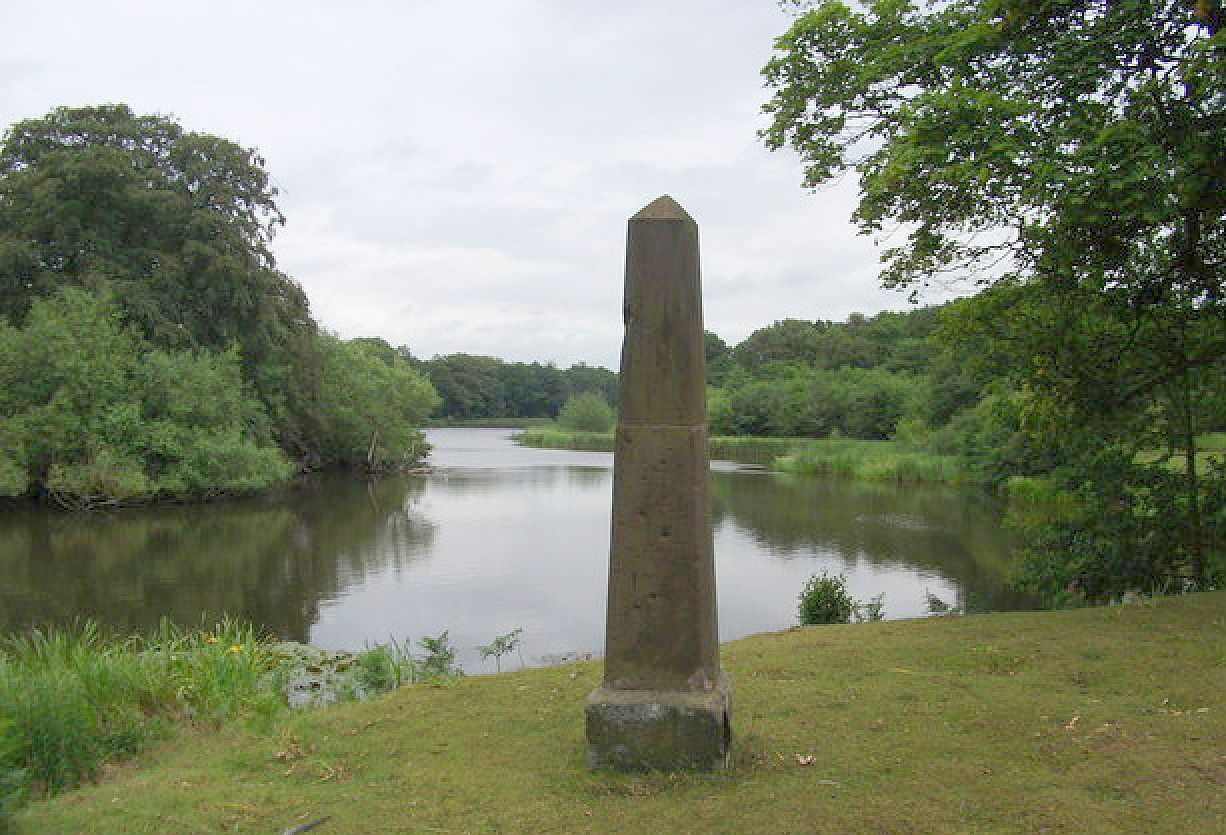
The grade II listed obelisk, overlooking the larger of the park's two artificial lakes

The park, including 10 acres (4 ha) of gardens, are listed as Grade II on the National Register of Historic Parks and Gardens, and are promoted by the Campaign to Protect Rural England. While there is a description in a seventeenth-century survey, describing the 'orchards, gardens and courts within the Greene before the hall', there are no other known records of the gardens until 1790, when gardener Humphry Repton was commissioned to landscape the grounds. Repton's proposal was not implemented until 1803, when Richard Wilbraham III employed a John Webb to construct a new driveway, create two artificial lakes, the smaller one called Stew Pond and the one-mile long Rode Pool, and lay out a "Wild Garden".

The gardens are still maintained by the current owner and his wife and have been recognised as a member of Cheshire's Gardens of Distinction. An Italian Garden was constructed in 2007 and contains olive and cypress trees. The garden's design was inspired by the Garden of Ninfa, an English-style garden outside of Rome which was planted under the guidance of Lady Constance Adela (Ada) Bootle-Wilbraham, a distant relative of the owners.

=== Kitchen garden ===
The 2-acre (1 ha) walled kitchen garden was built in the early 1700s to provide fruit and vegetables for the estate. The Victorian head gardener's cottage is built into the southern wall. Alongside the west wall is a private path, known as the Colonel's Walk, used by the family to bypass the kitchen garden on their way to church. There are traces of original chimneys built into the wall supporting espaliered fruit trees, added to maintain an optimum temperature for year-round growth. One of these chimneys has been restored. The garden is still in use today and includes traditional and exotic varieties [of vegetables], and fruit bushes, some of which are used to make jams and chutneys for sale in the hall's tearooms.

=== Structures ===
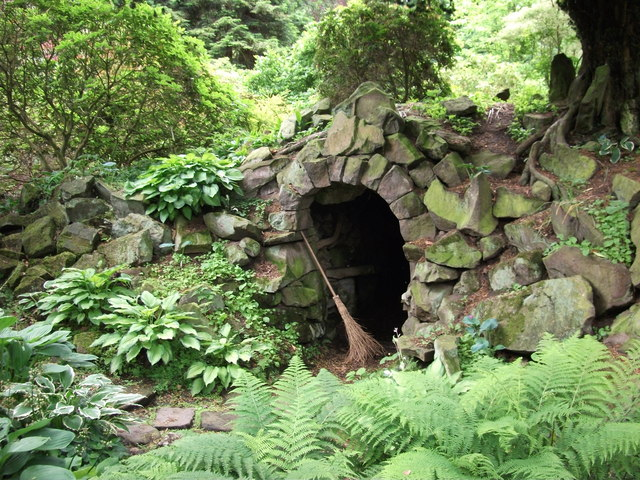
The entrance to the Grotto

Four structures in the grounds around the house are recorded in the National Heritage List for England as designated Grade II listed buildings; Grade II listing means that a building or structure is considered to be "nationally important and of special interest". The red-brick and rubble grotto was constructed in either the 18th or 19th century, and is built around a brick barrel vaulted tunnel, decorated internally with plasterwork and shells. The ice house is also in the garden and is built in brick and covered in earth. A tunnel-vaulted passage leads into a circular chamber with a domed roof. The obelisk is on the edge of the larger of the two estate lakes, and is in sandstone with chamfered edges. It stands on a square plinth and is constructed in two sections; the upper section was added later. It was originally at Kent Green, a nearby hamlet. The stable block was built in 1804 to the designs of one John Hope. As with the main house, the block is constructed in red Flemish-bond brickwork, with ashlar quoins and banding and a slate roof. Originally there were a number of open archways, several of which have since been bricked-up. The two central openings are topped with a stone pediment and the roof features an octagonal bellcote, with an ogee dome.

=== Mow Cop Castle ===
Mow Cop Castle is an elaborate, Gothic Revival folly, built two miles from Rode Hall, at Mow Cop, land previously belonging to the estate. Dating from 1754, the castle was built by Randle Wilbraham III and designed by the Hiorne brothers, the architects who worked on the 1752 improvements to the hall. It was constructed to improve the view across the valley from the hall. The family often used it as a summer house and for picnics. The castle fell into disrepair a number of times in the 19th century and several programmes of restoration were completed, including the replacement of the doors at a cost of £4 4s. The castle and surrounding land were sold by the Wilbrahams in 1923. The castle is renowned as the birthplace of Primitive Methodism, following a camp meeting there in 1807.

== Present day ==
Rode Hall is still owned and occupied by the Wilbrahams, currently by the 9th Baronet, Sir Randle Baker Wilbraham, and his wife, Lady Amanda Baker Wilbraham. The hall and gardens are open to the public from April to September, for an entrance fee. The tearooms, housed within the stable block, use and sell the produce from the kitchen garden. Every month a farmers' market is held next to the kitchen garden.

The Just So Festival, a family festival, takes place on the estate every August.

== See also ==
- Grade II* listed buildings in Cheshire East
- Listed buildings in Odd Rode
