= Odd Rode =

Civil parish in Cheshire, England

Coordinates: 53.116°N 2.254°W

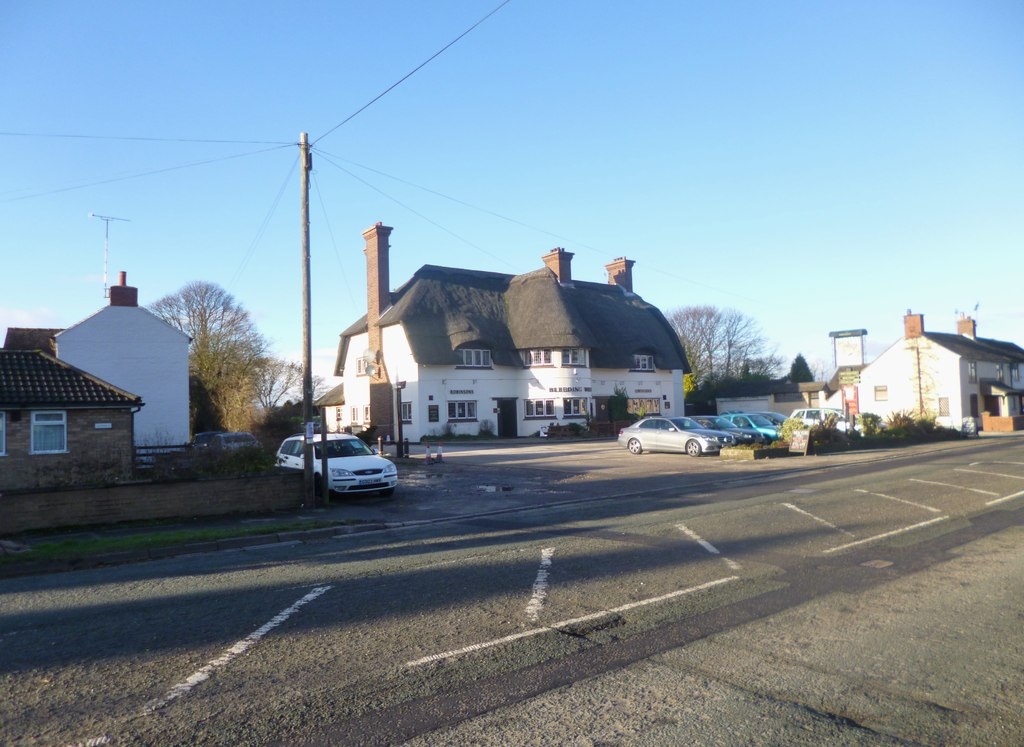
- The Bleeding Wolf public house

- Location within Cheshire
- Population: 5,442 (2011)
- OS grid reference: SJ830577
- Civil parish: Odd Rode
- Unitary authority: Cheshire East
- Ceremonial county: Cheshire
- Region: North West
- Country: England
- Sovereign state: United Kingdom
- Post town: STOKE-ON-TRENT
- Postcode district: ST7
- Dialling code: 01270
- Police: Cheshire
- Fire: Cheshire
- Ambulance: North West
- UK Parliament: Congleton

Odd Rode is a civil parish in the unitary authority of Cheshire East and the ceremonial county of Cheshire, England. It borders the Staffordshire parish of Kidsgrove. Of particular note in the area is Rode Hall, seat of the Wilbraham family.

== Settlements ==
The parish includes the settlements of Scholar Green, Mow Cop, Mount Pleasant, Rode Heath, Thurlwood and The Bank. The population of the civil parish as of the 2011 census was 5,442.

== Toponymy ==
"Rode" (Old English rod) means "(wood)land cleared for farming". There are several competing explanations of the meaning of "Odd": "Old"; "Odd" (Middle English odde) in the sense of "the third of three", i.e. to contrast this Rode with North Rode and Rode Heath; "Hood's" (Middle English hod), from the name of a thirteenth-century tenant of the manor; "Odda's", from an Old English forename.

== Churches ==
There are three Anglican Church of England churches in the parish: All Saints', Scholar Green; St. Luke's, Mow Cop; and The Church of the Good Shepherd, Rode Heath. The churches have long histories and host services and events throughout the year. The current incumbent priest is the Rev. Philip Atkinson.

== See also ==
- Listed buildings in Odd Rode
