= Cadeby, South Yorkshire =

Village and civil parish in South Yorkshire, England

Coordinates: 53.499523°N 1.222275°W

Cadeby
- Village and civil parish
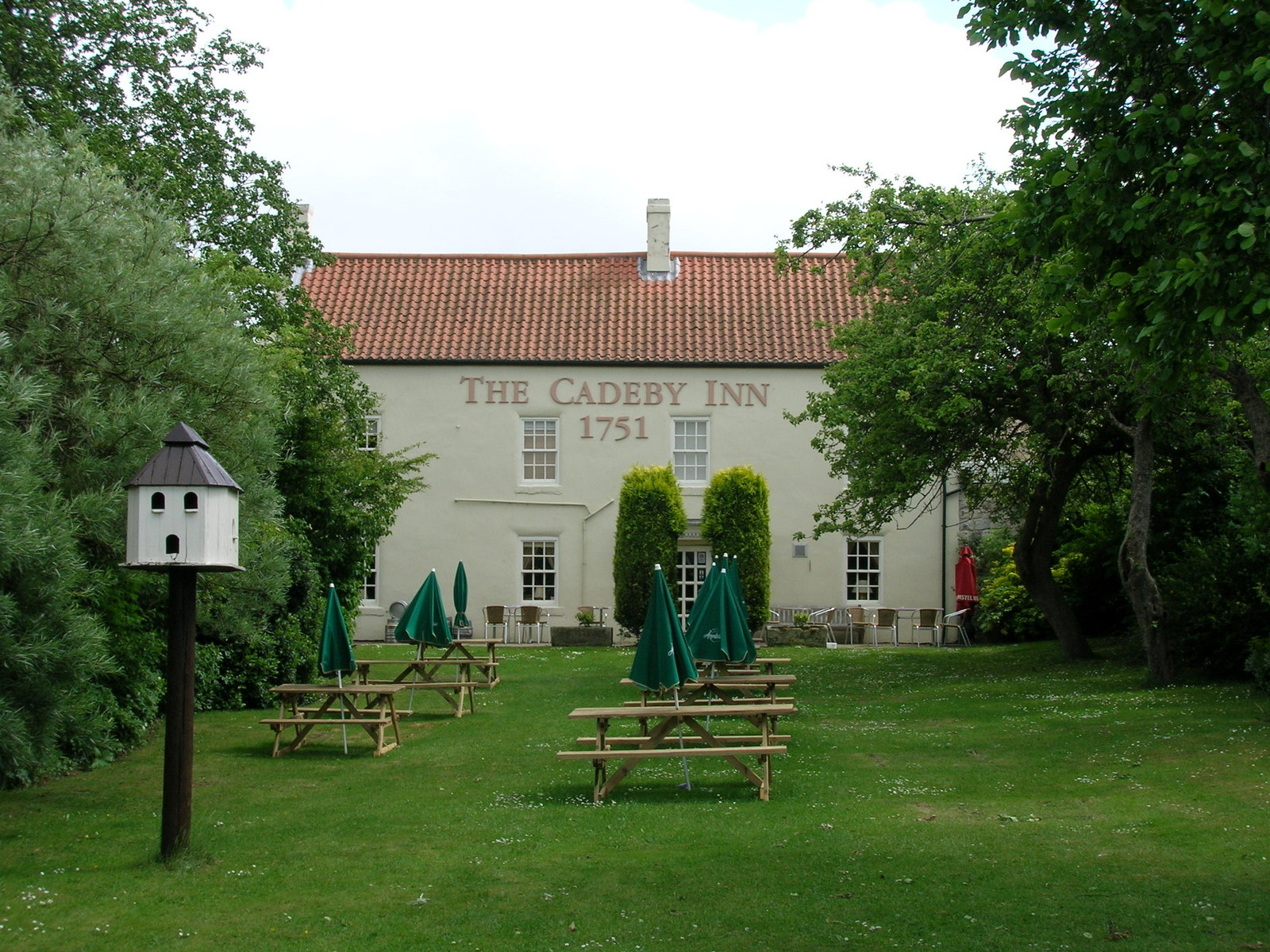
- The Cadeby Inn

- Location within the City of Doncaster Location within South Yorkshire
- Area: 1.75 sq mi (4.5 km^{2})
- Population: 203 (2001 Census)
  - Density: 116/sq mi (45/km^{2})
- OS grid reference: SE5100
- Civil parish: Cadeby
- Metropolitan borough: Doncaster
- Metropolitan county: South Yorkshire
- Region: Yorkshire and the Humber
- Country: England
- Sovereign state: United Kingdom
- Post town: DONCASTER
- Postcode district: DN5
- Dialling code: 01709
- Police: South Yorkshire
- Fire: South Yorkshire
- Ambulance: Yorkshire

Cadeby is a village and civil parish in the City of Doncaster in South Yorkshire, England. The population at the census of 2011 was 203. It is about five miles west of Doncaster, and four miles east of Mexborough.

== History ==
The manor of Cadeby was held in medieval times by the Norman baronial Fitzwilliam family, and later by their descendants, the Copley baronets. Later, it was inherited by barrister Thomas Levett, a native of High Melton, who sold to his brother, York barrister John Levett, who in turn sold it to Edmund Hastings, Esq., of Plumtree, Nottinghamshire.

== Cadeby Quarry ==
Close to the village is Cadeby Quarry, a site of special scientific interest, which was notified in 1977 for its geological interest. The site covers 240 acres (97 hectares) of the old quarry. It is one of 35 sites of special scientific interest in South Yorkshire.

== See also ==
- Listed buildings in Cadeby, South Yorkshire
- St John the Evangelist's Church, Cadeby
- Cadeby Main Colliery
