= Green Hammerton =

Village and civil parish in North Yorkshire, England

Coordinates: 54°00′20″N 1°18′03″W

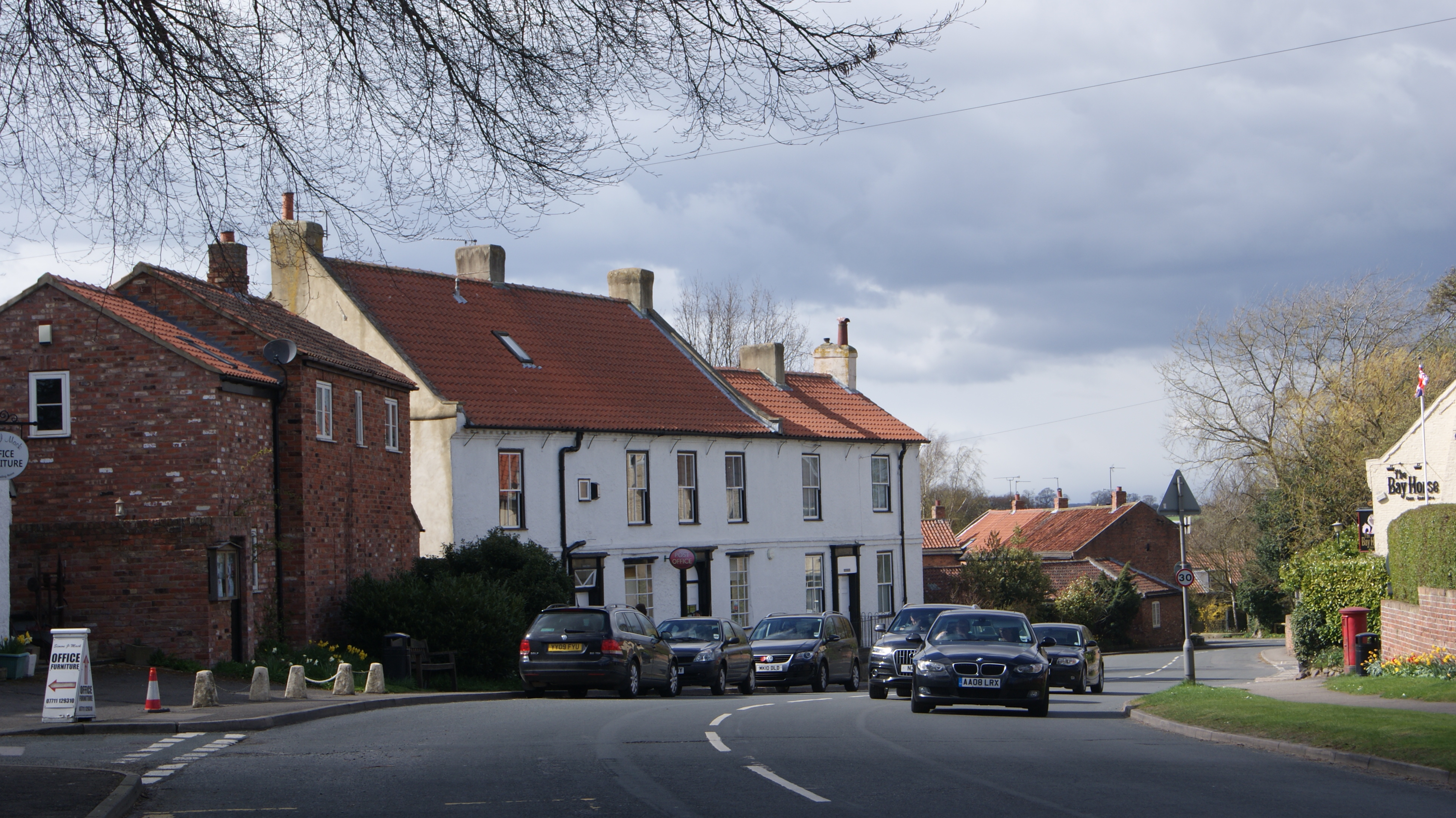
- Green Hammerton

- Location within North Yorkshire
- Population: 675 (2011 census)
- OS grid reference: SE459568
- Civil parish: Green Hammerton
- Unitary authority: North Yorkshire
- Ceremonial county: North Yorkshire
- Region: Yorkshire and the Humber
- Country: England
- Sovereign state: United Kingdom
- Post town: YORK
- Postcode district: YO26
- Police: North Yorkshire
- Fire: North Yorkshire
- Ambulance: Yorkshire

Green Hammerton is a village and civil parish in the county of North Yorkshire, England. It is situated on the A59 road, 8 miles (13 km) west of York and 10 miles (16 km) east of Harrogate. Along with nearby Kirk Hammerton, the village is served by Hammerton railway station on the Harrogate line.

(H)ambretone, a place-name reflected now both in Kirk Hammerton ('Hammerton with the church', from Old Norse kirkja 'church') and in Green Hammerton ('Hammerton with the green', from Middle English grene), is first attested in Domesday Book of 1086. The name seems to derive from the Old English plant name hamor (the meaning of which is not certain but may include hammer-sedge or pellitory of the wall) + tūn 'settlement, farm, estate'.

The village has a Church of England parish church, St Thomas' Church, Green Hammerton (see 'External Links' below for a survey of burials in the churchyard) and a church primary school, both in the centre of the village. The former Congregational church in Green Hammerton, originally built as a Methodist chapel in the late 1790s, was adapted for use as a Roman Catholic church, St Joseph’s, in 1961.

The village pub is the Bay Horse Inn. Green Hammerton Village Hall opened in April 2010: it is run by the Green Hammerton Recreational Charity.

Until 1974 it was part of the West Riding of Yorkshire. From 1974 to 2023 it was part of the Borough of Harrogate, it is now administered by the unitary North Yorkshire Council.

== Notable people ==
- John Hughlings Jackson (1835–1911), neurologist

== See also ==
- Listed buildings in Green Hammerton

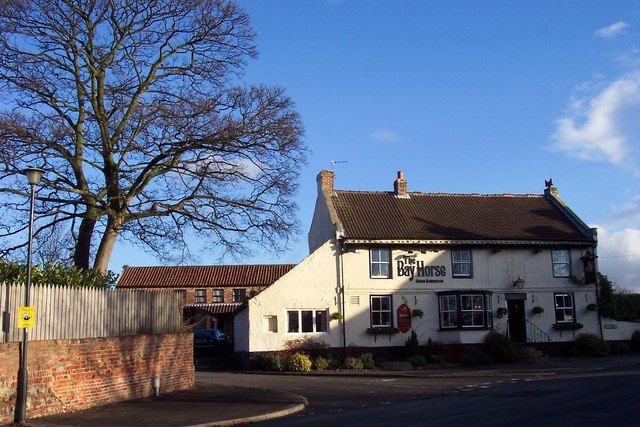
The Bay Horse Inn at Green Hammerton
