= Manor of Bradwall =

Estate in Cheshire, England

Coordinates: 53.166°N 2.374°W

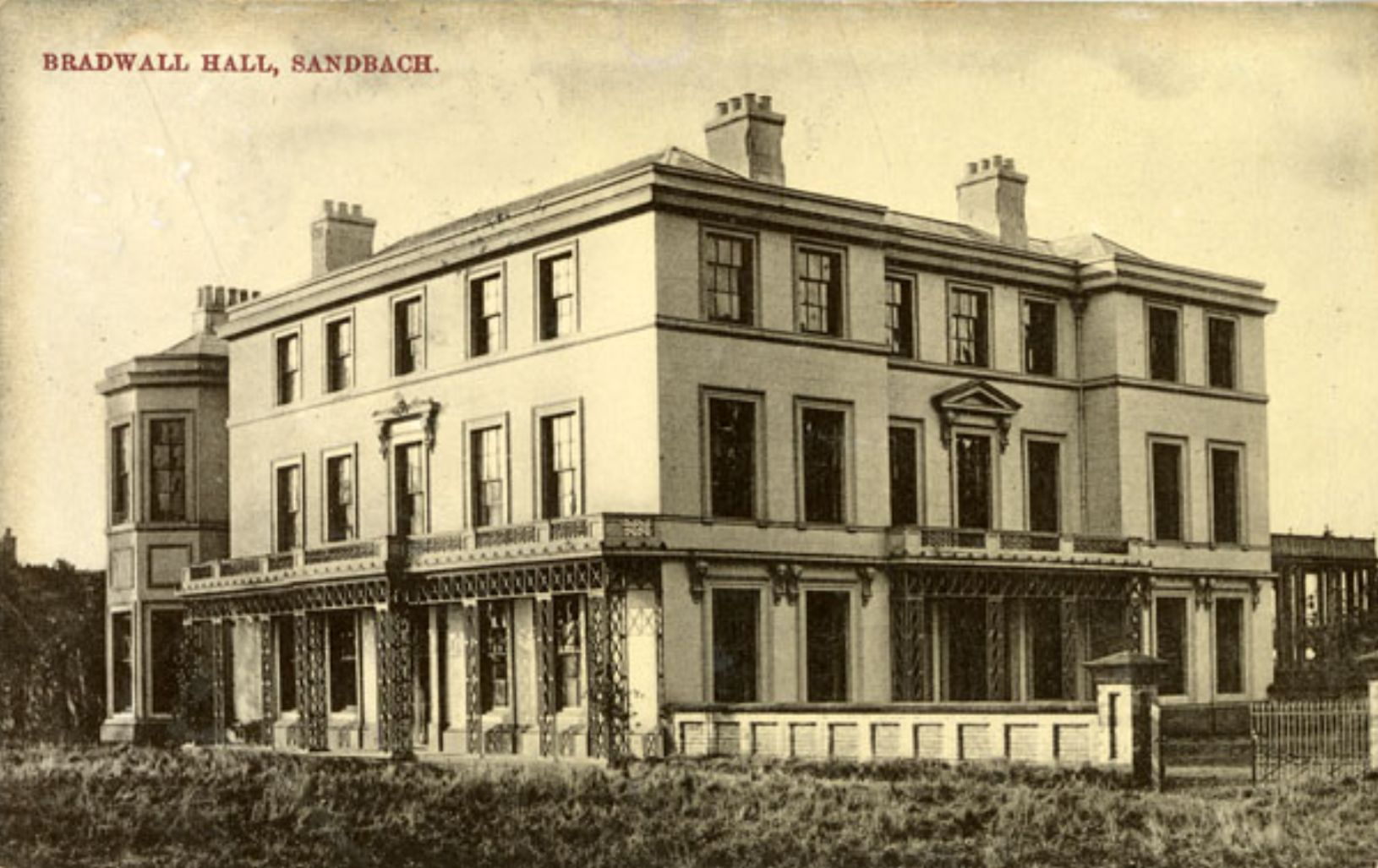
Bradwall Hall – Latham family seat

The manor of Bradwall was a manorial estate (i.e. the land) in the parish of Bradwall near Sandbach in Cheshire, which dates back to the 13th century. Several families have been associated with either the manor, or the more recent country seat at Bradwall Hall.

== Bradwall of Bradwall (13th–14th centuries) ==
Richard de Bradwall (living before 1232 in the time of King John) was a member of the first of two families to settle in the manor of Bradwall, becoming the mesne lord of a moiety of the manor.

He was succeeded by Reginald de Bradwall, followed by a line of three Richards, until Richard de Bradwall who married Elizabeth (daughter of Thomas de Sandbach) had three daughters, and his male line became extinct.

At one time, Richard owned the Elworth Estate located partly in Bradwall, which he passed to his son Thomas de Helleworth, in about the time of Edward I (1272–1307). The family coat of arms is not certain.

== Venables of Bradwall (14th century) ==
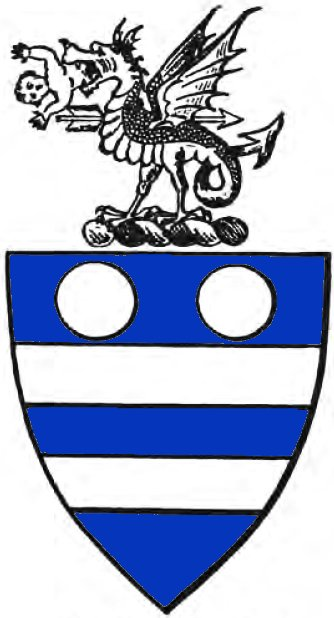
Venables of Bradwall arms.

The second of the two families who settled in the manor of Bradwall included Sir William Venables (living in 1312). He is well noted for a skirmish with the abbot of the Monastery of St Mary or Vale Royal, on behalf of his older brother Sir Hugh Venables, Baron of Kinderton, in which the abbot's attendant was killed with an arrow; he also served as High Sheriff of Cheshire.

The second son, Sir William Venables (living in 1362), succeeded to the family estates; the estate was divided between his three daughters (Joan, Katherine, and Ellen), passing to the Beryingtons through marriage.

The Venables' coat of arms features a dragon-like wyvern devouring a child (see illustration for details).

== Berington of Moresbarrow and Bradwall (14th–16th centuries) ==
William de Beryngton of Moorsborough and Bradwall acquired the title from his mother, Joan Venables of Bradwall, who married Thomas de Beryngton. The title remained in the family for about six generations, until Helen Berington, the only daughter and heiress of William and Elizabeth, married Philip Oldfield in about 1569. The family coat of arms features three greyhounds below a crest depicting a greyhound's head (see illustration for details).

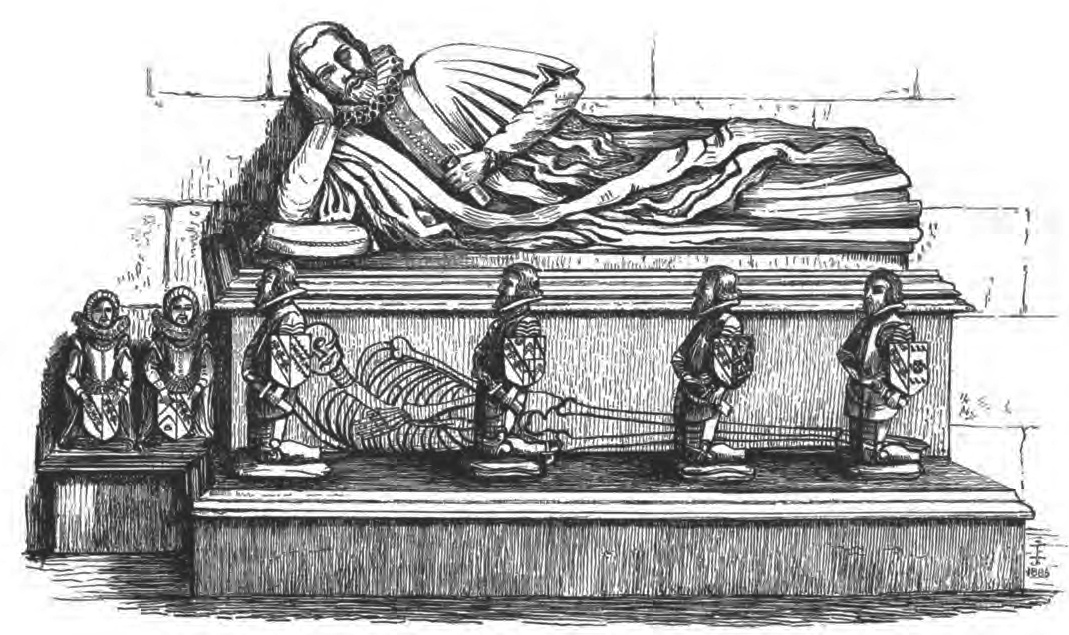
Philip Oldfield of Bradwall's tomb at St Mary-on-the-Hill, Chester.

== Oldfield of Bradwall (16th–18th centuries) ==
Philip Oldfield succeeded to Bradwall at the time of his marriage to Joan Berington around 1869. A notable barrister who practised at Chester, a recumbent alabaster effigy in his memory remains in the Church of St Mary-on-the-Hill, Chester. The estate passed through six generations, until one William Oldfield, an unmarried only son, sold the estate in 1719. The Oldfield coat of arms features three crosses pattées, and a wyvern on a coronet (see illustration for details).

== Ward, and Jervis, of Bradwall (18th–19th centuries) ==
William Oldfield sold the Bradwall estate to Charles Ward, a Dubliner, who five years later in 1725, conveyed it to his son-in-law, John Jervis (who died in Bradwall), who in turn passed the title to his son, John Jervis, a Welsh circuit judge, who held the title until his death in 1802. On 9 June 1802, the trustees conveyed the estate to John Latham MD.

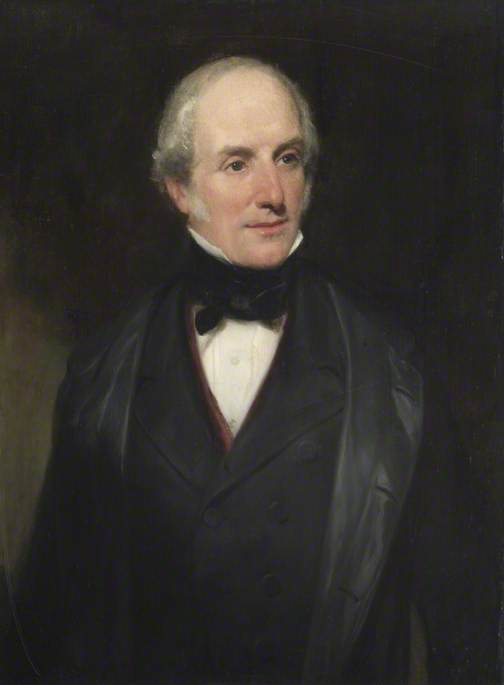
Dr. Peter Latham c.1850

== Latham of Bradwall (19th century) ==
The Latham family owned the Bradwall estate for three generations. John Latham (1761–1843) was a physician who became President of the Royal College of Physicians. His sons were John Latham (1787–1853), a magistrate and poet, and Peter Mere Latham (1789–1875), a physician. Latham senior's grandson George William Latham (1827–1886) was an English landowner, barrister and Liberal politician. When his wife died two years later, in November 1888, the estate was sold to Thomas Barlow, Esq. of Torkington, near Stockport. The Latham coat of arms features an eagle preying on a child (see illustration for details).

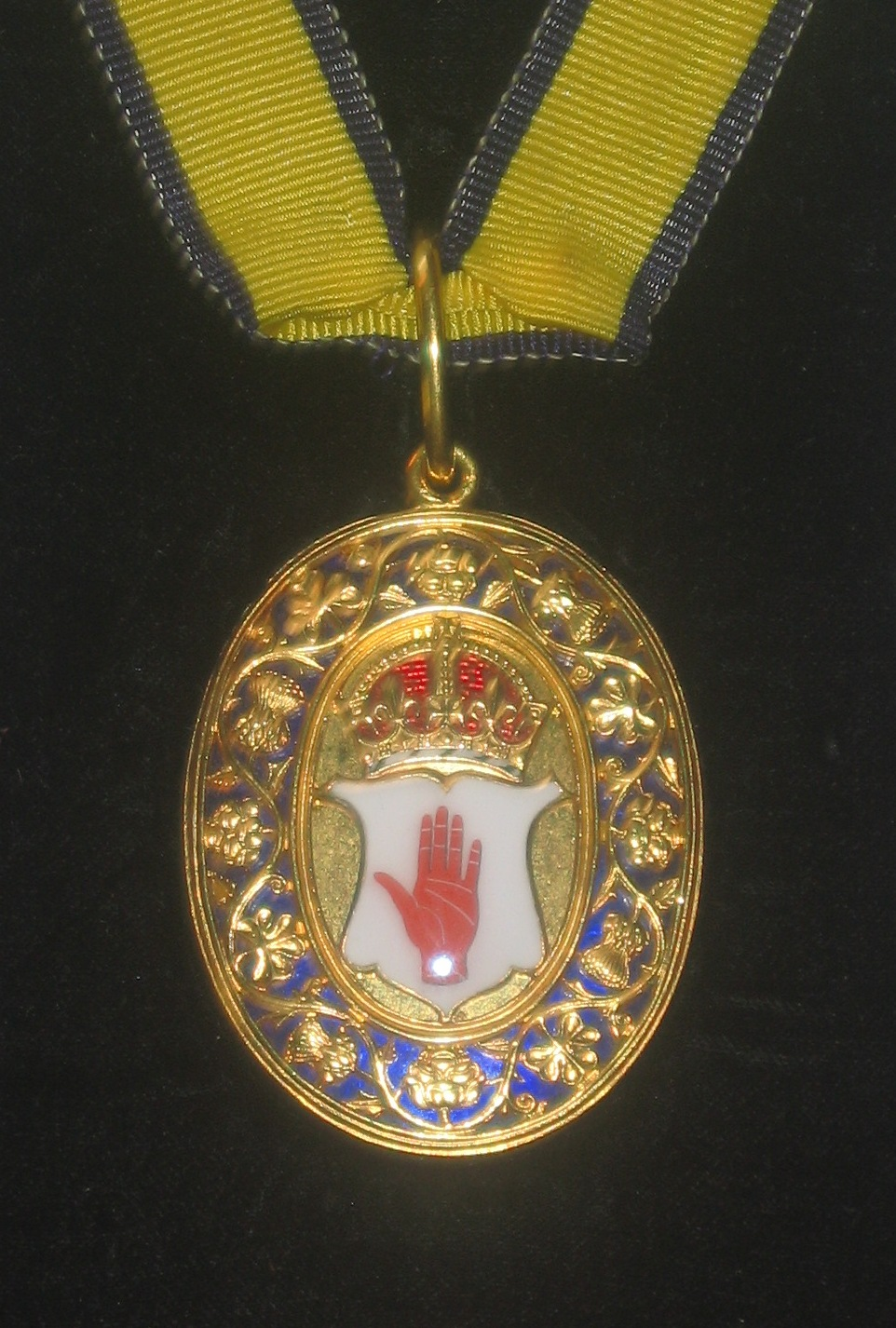
Insignia of a UK baronet

== Barlow Baronetcy of Bradwall Hall (20th–21st centuries) ==
The Barlow baronetcy of Bradwall was created on 20 July 1907 for John Emmott Barlow (1857–1932), a successful businessman and Liberal Member of Parliament representing Frome. The second baronet was his son, John Denman Barlow (1898–1986), a member of parliament for Eddisbury and Middleton and Prestwich. Sir John Barlow's brother, Thomas Bradwall Barlow, was a director of the family firm, Bradwall (F.M.S) Rubber Estate, Ltd. which developed rubber plantations in what was then British Malaya. The present baronet, since 1986, is Sir John Kemp Barlow, 3rd Bt.
