= Bradwall =

Village in Cheshire, England

Coordinates: 53.1684°N 2.3614°W

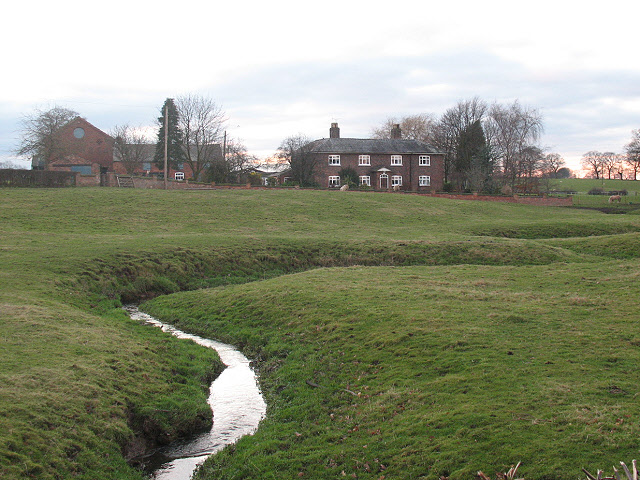
- The Small Brook running through Bradwall

- Location within Cheshire
- Population: 182
- OS grid reference: SJ759635
- Civil parish: Bradwall
- Unitary authority: Cheshire East
- Ceremonial county: Cheshire
- Region: North West
- Country: England
- Sovereign state: United Kingdom
- Post town: SANDBACH
- Postcode district: CW11
- Dialling code: 01270
- Police: Cheshire
- Fire: Cheshire
- Ambulance: North West
- UK Parliament: Congleton

Bradwall is a small village and civil parish in the unitary authority of Cheshire East, about 2 mi (3.2 km) northwest of Sandbach in the ceremonial county of Cheshire, England, and about 20 mi (32 km) south of Manchester. According to the 2011 census, the population of the entire parish was 182. The area is predominantly agricultural, with no manufacturing or retail outlets.

The village is not mentioned in the 11th-century Domesday survey, but from the 13th century gained notability as the manorial estate of Richard de Bradwall and his successors, including the families of Venables, Berington and Oldfield. From the early 19th century, it became the seat of the Latham family of Bradwall who resided at Bradwall Hall until its demolition in the early 20th century.

Bradwall hosts social events at the Village Hall, horse trial competitions (eventing) at Manor farm, and coarse fishing at Field Farm Fisheries. The Wesleyan Chapel Methodist Church has been the only place of worship since 1882 and closed in September 2013. The manufacturer of Foden Trucks and their award-winning Fodens Motor Works Band, were based in Bradwall until a boundary change in 1936 placed them in the adjacent parish of Sandbach.

== History ==
=== Place name ===
Bradwall is not mentioned in the Domesday Book, completed in 1086 for William I of England, at which time the area was thought to be uncultivated moorland between Brereton and Warmingham, that formed part of the southern boundary of the Barony of Kinderton, the historic name of Middlewich.

The township derives its name from the Old English word brāde, meaning broad, and wælla meaning spring. Variant spellings include (dates in brackets): Brade-, -wal, -wale, -walle, Bradwall (1226), Brad(e)well(e) (1281), Brod(e)wall (1324), (Note: The Private Archives Team at the National Archives notes that this "consists of a typed list of 84 pages recording a collection of deeds in the possession of Eric Barker Esq of 6 Millview Terrace, Greenland Road, Worthing, Sussex, compiled in c. 1950 [...] could not be traced in March 1969' [and] the collection appears to have been dispersed.) Beatwall (1326), Broadwall (1415), Bardwell (1438), and, Bradwell (1724). The name was also associated with the local hamlet of Hollinsgreen, where it was referred to as Bradwall et Hollins (c. 1662), and Bradwall cum Hollins (1819). Today, the township also lends its name to the hamlet of Bradwall Green.

=== Archaeological finds ===
There is evidence of Bronze Age and Roman activity in the area. A Late Bronze Age axe head dating to around 1000-801 BC was found near Fields Farm Fisheries in Bradwall. Around a thousand Roman coins dating from not earlier than 270 AD were discovered in 1820, on the eastern side of Bradwall, a short distance from the Brindley Moor's Farm and about four miles direct from the Roman station at Kinderton, at a point where a small brook is crossed by the footpath from Brereton to Sandbach. Discovered by a mole-catcher, the coins included examples of denarii of Gallienus, Claudius II, Tetricus, Victorinus, and Diocletian. The remains of part of a Roman road, are also thought to have been discovered near the western side of Bradwall, by Boothlane, towards the west of Sandbach, and near King Street. Since the 1936 parish boundary changes, the road's location is now in Elworth on Roman Way in Sandbach Parish.

=== Manor of Bradwall ===
The first records that mention Bradwall are from about the 13th century, when the Venables family of Kinderton divided the manorial estate (i.e. the land) of Bradwall into two parts or "moieties". Several families have been associated with either the Manor, or the more recent country seat at Bradwall Hall, including:

Approx. date	Family	Notable people
13th–14th centuries	Bradwall of Bradwall	Richard de Bradwall the first of two family who settle in the Manor of Bradwall
14th century	Venables of Bradwall	Sir William Venables the second of the two family who settle in the Manor of Bradwall
14th–16th centuries	Berington of Moresbarrow and Bradwall	William de Beryngton. The title remained in the family for about six generations
16th–18th centuries	Oldfield of Bradwall	Philip Oldfield, a barrister. An effigy of him is in a Chester church (illustration)
18th–19th centuries	Ward, and Jervis, of Bradwall	Charles Ward of Dublin, who conveyed the seat to his son-in-law: John Jervis, who in turn passed the title to his son; John Jervis, a Welsh judge
19th century	Latham of Bradwall	John Latham (1761–1843) a physician who became President of the Royal College of Physicians; Peter Mere Latham (1789–1875) a physician and "a great medical educator".; George William Latham (1827–1886), was an English landowner, barrister and a Liberal politician.
20th century	Barlow Baronetcy of Bradwall Hall	John Emmott Barlow (1857–1932), a businessman and Liberal Member of Parliament, his eldest son: John Denman Barlow (1898–1986), a Conservative Member of Parliament, his son: Sir John Kemp Barlow, 3rd Bt. (1934–), the current holder of the title since 1986.

=== Seat of Bradwall ===
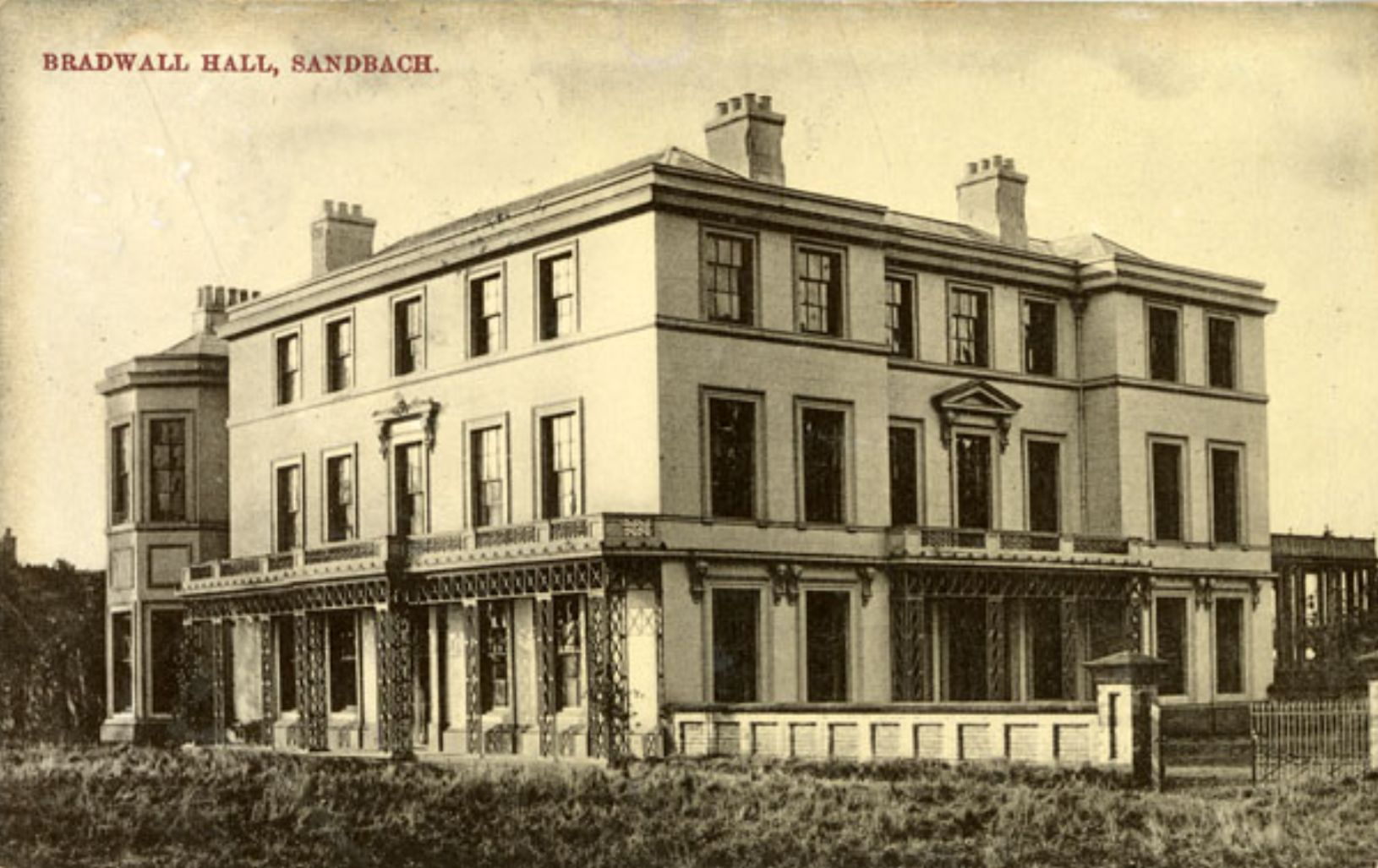
Bradwall Hall, seat of the Latham Family

The country seat of Bradwall (i.e. its buildings and its estate) is thought to have been originally on the west side of the parish, within a rectangular moat with a large pool, with the name Hallfields, near Hollins Wood. Hall Field next to Hollins Wood is also found on 19th-century tithe maps. At some later time, the seat moved eastwards to Bradwall Hall.

==== Bradwall Hall ====
Located nearer the middle of the parish, Bradwall Hall was the seat of the Latham Family. Recorded as early as 1803, the Hall is described as "a large white house with no architectural features of interest, is said by Dr. George Ormerod to have been 'a large building of brick, finished with gables, at the end of an avenue of firs and evergreens,' which had been enlarged and modernised from time to time". Following the 19th-century decline of the English country house, Bradwall Hall was demolished on 16 October 1960, blown up by the 214 Field Squadron of the Royal Engineers, although one of its cottages and the coach-house remain, and they are now Grade II listed buildings, dated by English Heritage to the 17th century.

==== Bradwall Reformatory School for Boys ====
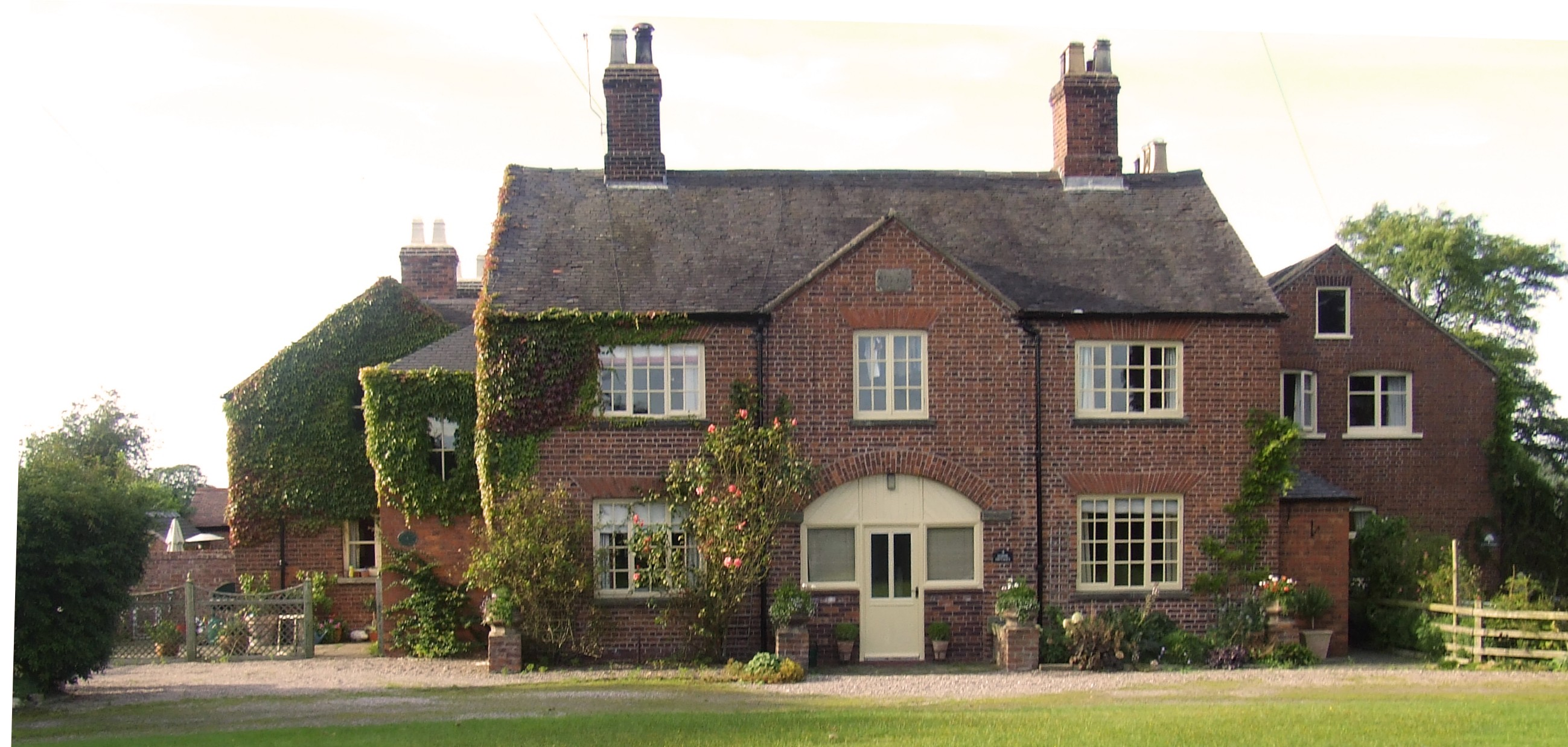
Former Bradwall Reformatory School in 2012, see location on a 1910 Ordnance Survey map

Bradwall Reformatory School was built by George William Latham (1827–1886) on his own property at Bradwall Hall, in 1855, and aimed to reform delinquent boys through the use of an industrial labour apprenticeship. A report to the House of Commons in 1861 reported that:

"There were 58 boys in the school when I inspected it. [...] I was glad to find that more of the ordinary farming processes were being resorted to; the plough and other common agricultural machines employed, so that the training of the lads as farm servants would be gradually made more complete than the use of spade labour allows of. The books are well kept. The punishments had been much fewer, chiefly fines or loss of privilege. [...] :The cost per head for the year was 18l. 9s. 11d."

Notable detainees included two eight-year-old boys, Peter Barratt and James Bradley, who on 11 April 1861 abducted and killed two-year-old George Burgess. They were charged with manslaughter, and sentenced by the judge Sir Charles Crompton to be sent to the Reformatory at Bradwall, which "was to rank as the most enlightened and successful institution of its kind in the country". Another detainee was one Joshua Tolley who was sent to Bradwall in 1871 at the age of eight. He was in and out of reform school until the age of 16, but as a persistent offender, served sentences in Knutsford and Dartmoor prisons.

George William Latham's cousin, Charles Latham (1816–1907) was surgeon to the Bradwall Reformatory from its foundation until his retirement in 1903. The school was renamed Bradwall Training School in 1908, and closed in 1920. The buildings are now Grade II listed, converted into cottages.

=== Economic history ===
Historically, Bradwall has been farming and pasture land with the majority of people working in agriculture. The 1881 Census notes that nearly 20% of the residents were in agriculture followed by nearly 12% in domestic service; 43% had an unknown, or non-specific occupation (see table below). The 1902 Kelly's Directory of Cheshire, noted that in Bradwall, "the crops are oats, roots, wheat and rye. The land is chiefly pasture", and that commercially, there are a total of 15 farmers, one blacksmith and the superintendent of the Reformatory School.

1881 Occupational breakdown
1881 Occupational Orders	Male	Female	Total	Total %
General/Local Government	2	2	4	1.1%
Professionals	3	1	4	1.1%
Domestic Service or Offices	6	37	43	11.5%
Commercial Occupations	5		5	1.3%
Transport & Comm.	7		7	1.9%
Agriculture	70	4	74	19.8%
Animals	1		1	0.3%
Workers in Machines & Implements	10		10	2.7%
Workers in House, Furniture & Decorations	11		11	2.9%
Workers in Carriages & Harnesses	1		1	0.3%
Workers in Food & Lodging	3	2	5	1.3%
Workers in Textile Fabrics	2		2	0.5%
Workers in Dress	8	14	22	5.9%
Workers in Var. Vegetable Substances	2		2	0.5%
Workers in Var. Mineral Substances	16		16	4.3%
Workers in General or Unspecified Commodities	5		5	1.3%
Persons without Specified Occupations	51	15	66	17.6%
Unknown Occupation	1	95	96	25.7%
Totals	204	170	374	100%

== Geography ==
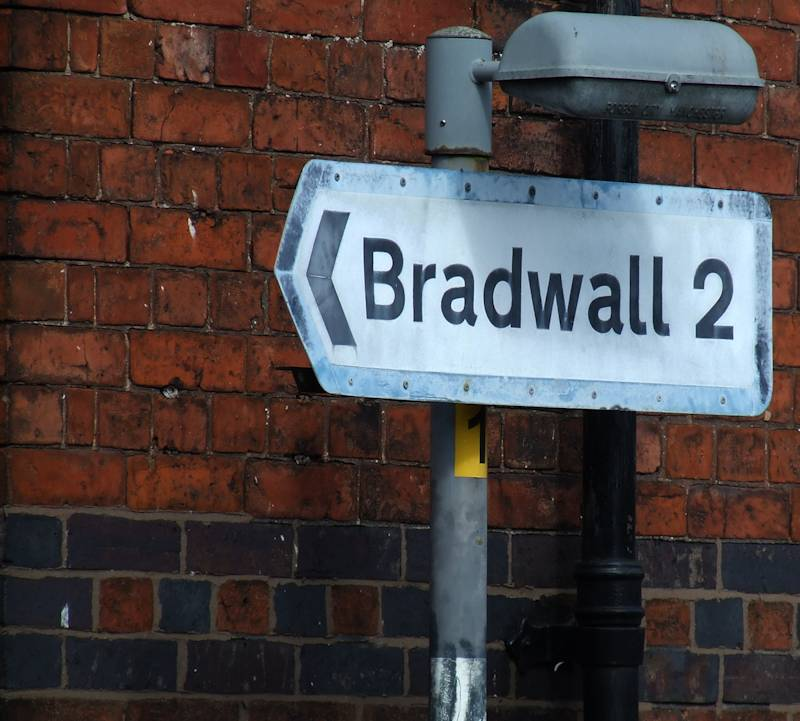
Bradwall road-sign in Sandbach

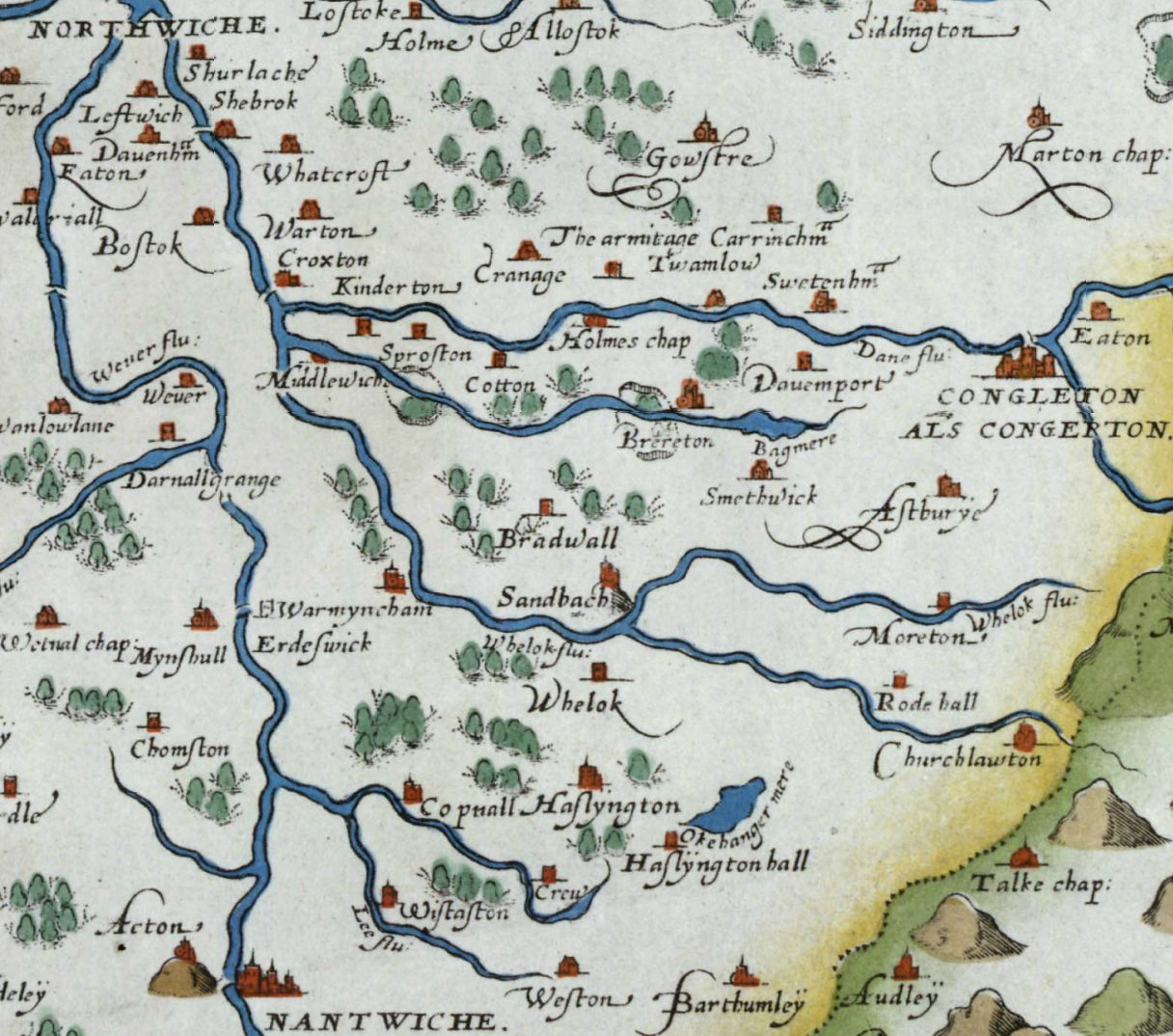
1577 map extract of Cheshire by Christopher Saxton showing Bradwall, and also the Rivers Croco, Wheelock and Dane. See also Bradwall Parish today

Bradwall is a village and parish council in southeast Cheshire in the northwest of England. As the crow flies, the Irish Sea is about 37 mi (60 km) northwest, Manchester city centre is about 22 mi (35 km) north, the county capital Chester is 22 mi (35 km) west, the Peak District is 13 mi (21 km) east, Stoke on Trent is 13 mi (21 km) southeast, and London is 150 mi (240 km) southeast (172 mi (277 km) by car). (Note: All distances derived from Google Earth. Retrieved 12 May 2012)

Locally, Bradwall is a mile north of Sandbach parish council, 7.5 mi (12.1 km) northeast of Crewe, 4 mi (6.4 km) southeast of Middlewich, 4 mi (6.4 km) south of Holmes Chapel, and 8 mi (13 km) west of Congleton. (Note: All distances derived from Google Maps. Retrieved 4 May 2012) The Parish covers 1,938 acres (784 ha) Somewhat irregular in shape, it extends about 3 mi (4.8 km) east-west, and 2.5 mi (4.0 km) north-south. The land is slightly undulating, at an elevation of about 130 ft (40 m) in the northwest, rising to about 195 ft (59 m) in the southeast. Wooded areas included Barlow Wood, Bradwall Wood, Denman Wood and Hollins Wood.

A handful of brooks flow throughout the parish, the most notable being the so-called Small Brook which flows into Sanderson's Brook in the adjacent Sproston Parish. The River Croco is about a 1.5 mi (2.4 km) north of Bradwall, and the River Wheelock about 2.5 mi (4.0 km) away from the southwest boundary of Bradwall. Both rivers join the River Dane in Middlewich, which itself flows about 2.5 mi (4.0 km) north, (see 1577 map). The Environment Agency indicates that the Small Brook may be subject to occasional, but not extensive flooding.

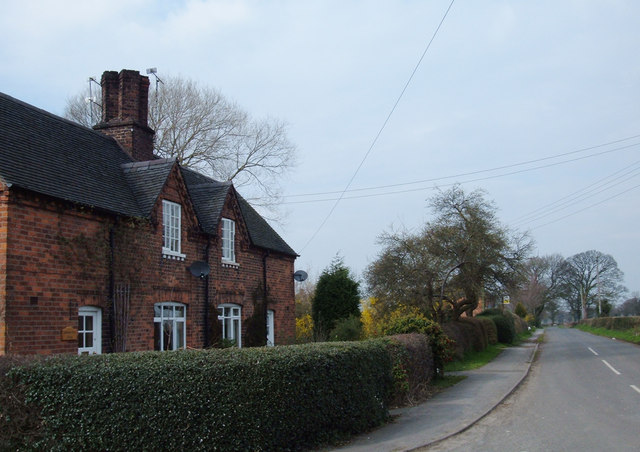
Hollinsgreen cottages along Wood Lane

Bradwall parish also includes the hamlets of Bradwall Green in the east, and Hollinsgreen in the west, which used to be called Hollins, and Bradwall-cum-Hollins, that was noted for a 16th-century water-powered corn mill. (Note: In 1589 there is mention of "a watercorn milne in Bradwall, called Hollynwood milne" and "Hollin Wood in Bradwall, formerly called Bradwall Wood". In the list of Cheshire Freeholders in 1579, Richard Halton of Hollins occurs.) There also used to be a hamlet called Hope in the parish. (Not to be confused with Bradwell in the Derbyshire parish of Hope.)

=== Climate ===
Following the rest of United Kingdom and its parent county, Cheshire, Bradwall has an oceanic climate influenced by the Atlantic Ocean, and also by its altitude due to its proximity to the Pennines.

Bradwall

Climate chart (precipitation, max. and min. temperature)
J	F	M	A	M	J	J	A	S	O	N	D
112 8 2	48 9 3	30 10 3	83 13 7	46 17 8	68 19 11	64 19 12	185 21 14	110 18 11	95 14 8	62 11 5	82 8 2
- █ Average max. and min. temperatures in °C
- █ Precipitation totals in mm
- Source: Met Office Ringway weather station, 14 mi (23 km) from Bradwall, 2003/4
Imperial conversion
J	F	M	A	M	J	J	A	S	O	N	D
4.4 46 36	1.9 47 37	1.2 51 38	3.3 56 44	1.8 62 46	2.7 66 52	2.5 67 53	7.3 70 57	4.3 65 52	3.7 56 46	2.4 52 41	3.2 46 35
- █ Average max. and min. temperatures in °F
- █ Precipitation totals in inches

See also: Average temperature chart, Precipitation chart, and Wind speed chart

== Geology ==
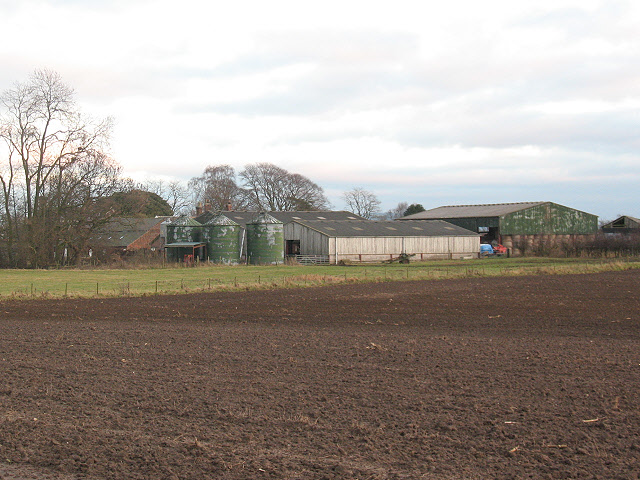
Bradwall topsoil at Springbank Farm

Bradwall sits mainly on fine-grained mudstone, over a bedrock of Wilkesley Halite member with Halite-stone. The halite is responsible for rock salt deposits in the surrounding area (see "Salt in Cheshire"), and there is evidence of there having been "wich fields" along the western side of Wards Lane that may indicate small scale brine extraction. The thickness of the bedrock is estimated at around 400 m, and was formed around 221 to 227 million years ago in the Late Triassic Carnian period, in a hot dry environment. It is surrounded by Devensian glacial till from the last glacial period from between approximately 110,000 and 10,000 years ago. A small pocket of undifferentiated river terrace deposits of sand and gravel, dating from the Quaternary about 2.5 million years old, is located southeast of the intersection of Pillar Box Lane with Bradwall Road. (See illustration at The British Geological Survey). The topsoil (Note: Bradwall topsoil is described as medium to course grained arenaceous-rudaceous, surrounded by fine-grained to course argillic-rudaceous.) reveals many trace elements, (Note: Bradwall soil trace elements include Ag Al B Ba Be Bi Ca Cd Ce Co Cr Cu Fe Ga K La Li Mg Mn Mo Nb Nd Ni P Pb Rb Sc Si Sr Sn Ti U V Y Zn Zr) and an acidity that has been decreasing since 1978. (Note: Bradwall soil acidity has been recorded at a high of pH 5.79 in 1978, decreasing to pH 6.27 in 2007.) Several boreholes in the area reveal glacial sand and clays with a couple of layers of ground water.

=== Seismology ===
One of the six major regional seismic profiles lines, the 189 mi (304 km) Lancaster to Birmingham profiles passes directly through Bradwall, as part of the Sandbach-Knutsford Sub-Basin of the Cheshire Basin. About five other minor seismic profiles also pass through Bradwall, all managed by the UK Onshore Geophysical Library, that are uses by resources exploration companies (such as oil, gas and coal). Bradwall does not lie in an earthquake zone, although on 11 November 1997, a rare magnitude 1.5 earthquake was recorded about 5 mi (8.0 km) due north in Byley.

== Demographics ==
Bradwall Parish population by age.

According to the 2011 census, the population of Bradwall Civil Parish totals 182 people (93 men and 89 women) in 67 households. All households described their ethnicity as white, and of the population of 182, 141 (77%) people stated their religion as Christian, 28 (15%) as no religion, the remaining 13 (7%) not stating a preference. The life expectancy at birth in 2007–2009 is 79 years for men, and 82 for women.

=== Population ===
The population of Bradwall peaked in the 1920s at over 1300. The sharp decline in population in the 1930s is due to the 1936 change in the parish boundaries, when the populated area of Elworth was moved from Bradwall Parish and into Sandbach Parish. Since the 1950s, there has been a slight decline in population, and it is now well under 200:

Year	1801	1811	1831	1841	1851	1861	1871	1881	1891	1901	1911	1921	1931	1951	1961	2001	2011
Population	252	258	297	344	291	437	587	662	758	924	1245	1358	1307	223	195	166	182

1801, 1831. 1811. 1841–1851. 1861–1871. 1881–1961 2001 2011

== Economy ==
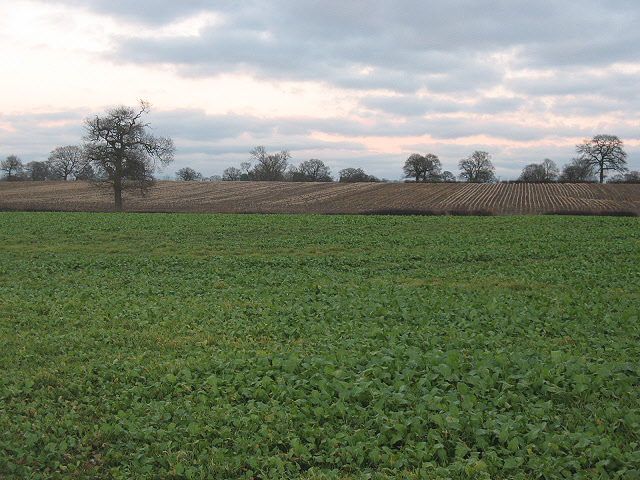
Winter crops by Cooksmere Lane

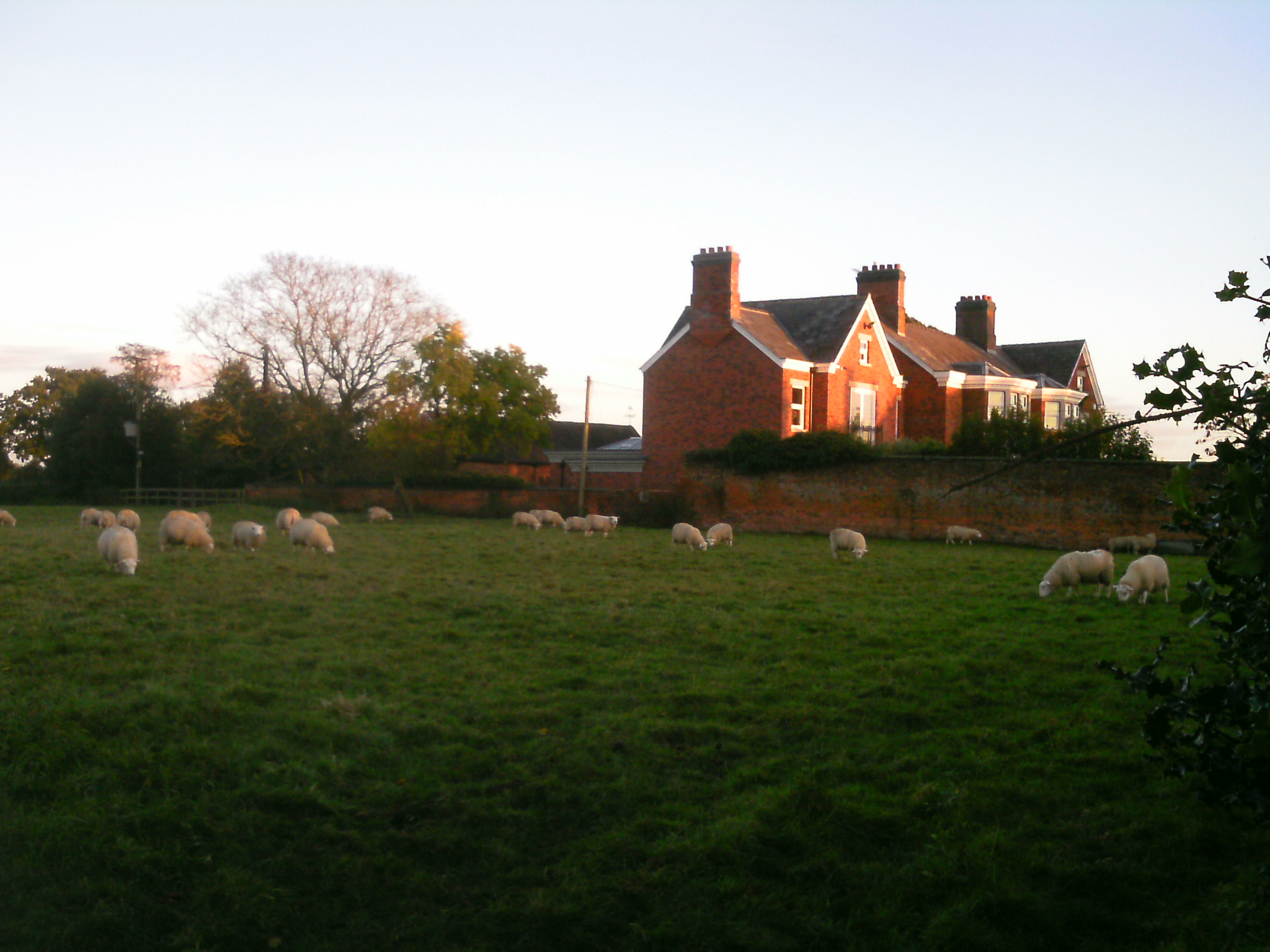
Bradwall House with sheep grazing on adjacent pasture

There are only around a dozen businesses operating in Bradwall today, half of which are farms split evenly between dairy and agricultural farming. Other businesses include property development, accountancy and gardening. Some of the farms also operate secondary businesses, notably riding schools, stables and an annual eventing event.

Compared to the 1881 Census (see Economic History), the working population recorded in the 2001 Census seems to show that the economy of Bradwall, along with the population, in decline.

The 2001 census notes that of the total population of 166, that 127 (77%) are of working age between 16 and 74. Of these, 90 (54%) are employed, divided between 36 people in "Extractive and Manufacturing Industries" and 54 people in "Service Industries". The Census also reveals the following occupational breakdown:

2001 Occupations	Count
Managerial and professional	40
Intermediate occupations	4
Small employers and own-account workers	25
Lower supervisory and technical occupations	9
Semi-routine and routine occupations	22
Never worked and long-term unemployed	0
Not classified	26

== Culture and community ==
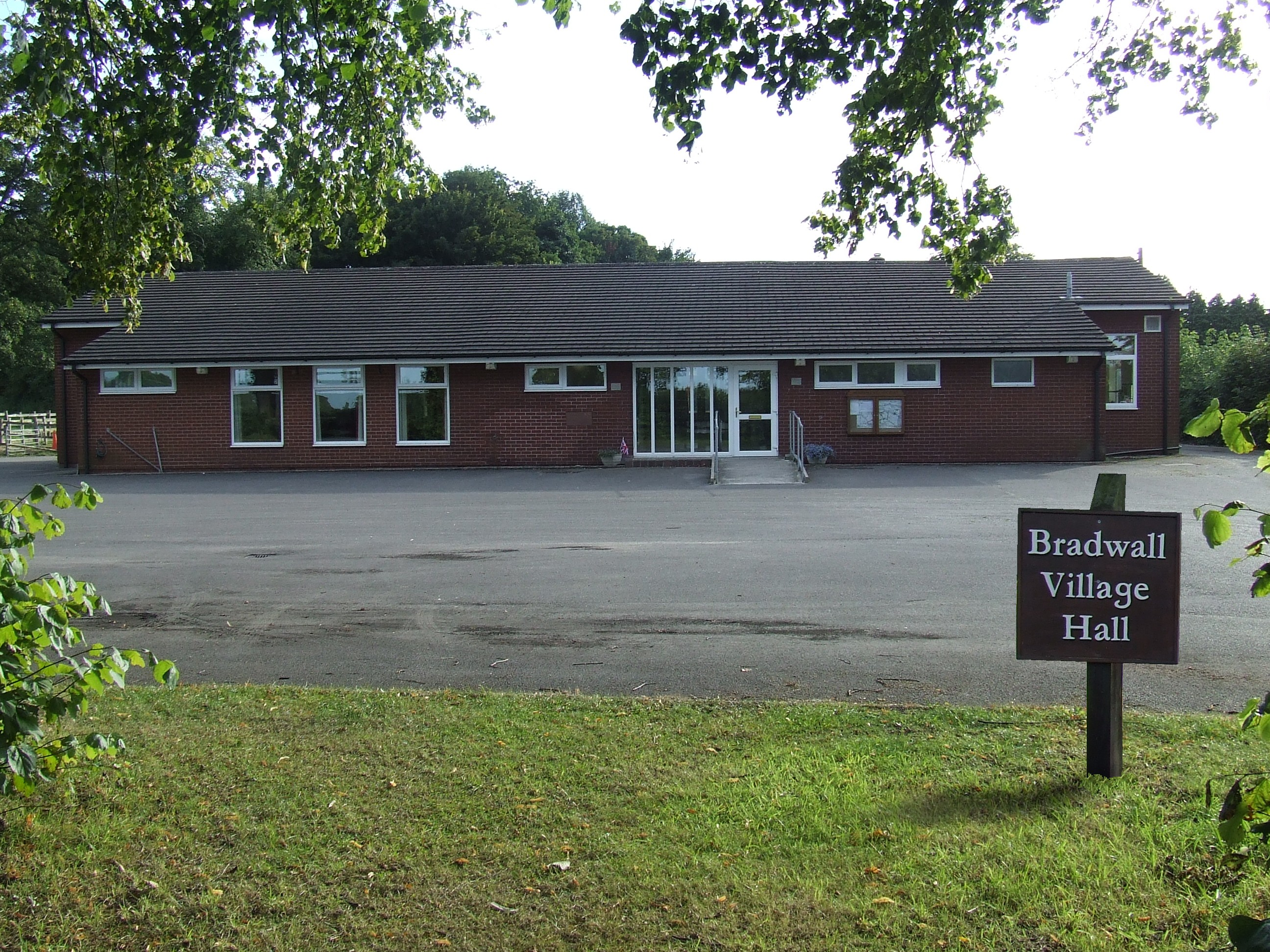
Bradwall Village Hall

=== Bradwall Village Hall ===
Bradwall Village Hall was opened on 26 October 1972 by Lady Diana Helen Barlow, (wife of Sir John), on land of the former Bradwall Hall. The hall is used for social and public events, such as Cheshire Rural Touring Arts, the South Cheshire Cheshire Beekeepers' Association, Sandbach Folk Dance Club, and the Probus Club of Sandbach. The Village Hall is also used as the local Polling Station.

=== Sport ===
Although it has a Sandbach postcode, coarse fishing is available in the southeast of Bradwall Civil Parish at Field Farm Fisheries with five pools stocked with barbel, bream, carp, chub, crucian, rudd, roach and tench. The equestrian governing body, British Eventing, holds horse trials in eventing at Manor Farm each year.

=== Parks and nature reserves ===
Bradwall Parish has no parks and nature reserves of its own. The nearest public park is Sandbach Park, about 1.75 mi (3 km) away, with bowling greens, play areas, skate park, tennis court and multi-use games area. Congleton Park is about 8 mi (13 km) away and includes a town wood and riverside walks. The Quinta Arboretum, created by Sir Bernard Lovell, is 9 mi (14 km) away in Swettenham, and features multiple species of trees, shrubs and avenues.

Grade II registered parks and gardens include Queen's Park in Crewe about 9 mi (14 km) away, featuring a boating lake, stream garden, trees and floral borders. Rode Hall in Odd Rode parish about 8 mi (13 km) away, is a landscape park designed by Humphry Repton in 1790 and created by John Webb in the early-19th century, and featuring a formal and kitchen garden.

Other countryside sites close to Bradwall include the Wheelock Rail Trail for walkers and cyclists, about 2.5 mi (4.0 km) away in Sandbach, and Brereton Heath Local Nature Reserve about 6 mi (9.7 km) away, which includes a 15-acre lake and "a wealth of bird life, including great and lesser spotted woodpeckers, nuthatch, treecreepers, kingfisher, grey heron, great crested grebe and goldfinch". About 4 mi (6.4 km) away is the Bagmere reserve, a Site of Special Scientific Interest, due to its internationally important series of meres and mosses, and "the last remaining site in Cheshire for the small pearl-bordered fritillary butterfly" The nearest bird reserve is 26 mi (42 km) way at Coombes Valley.

== Landmarks ==
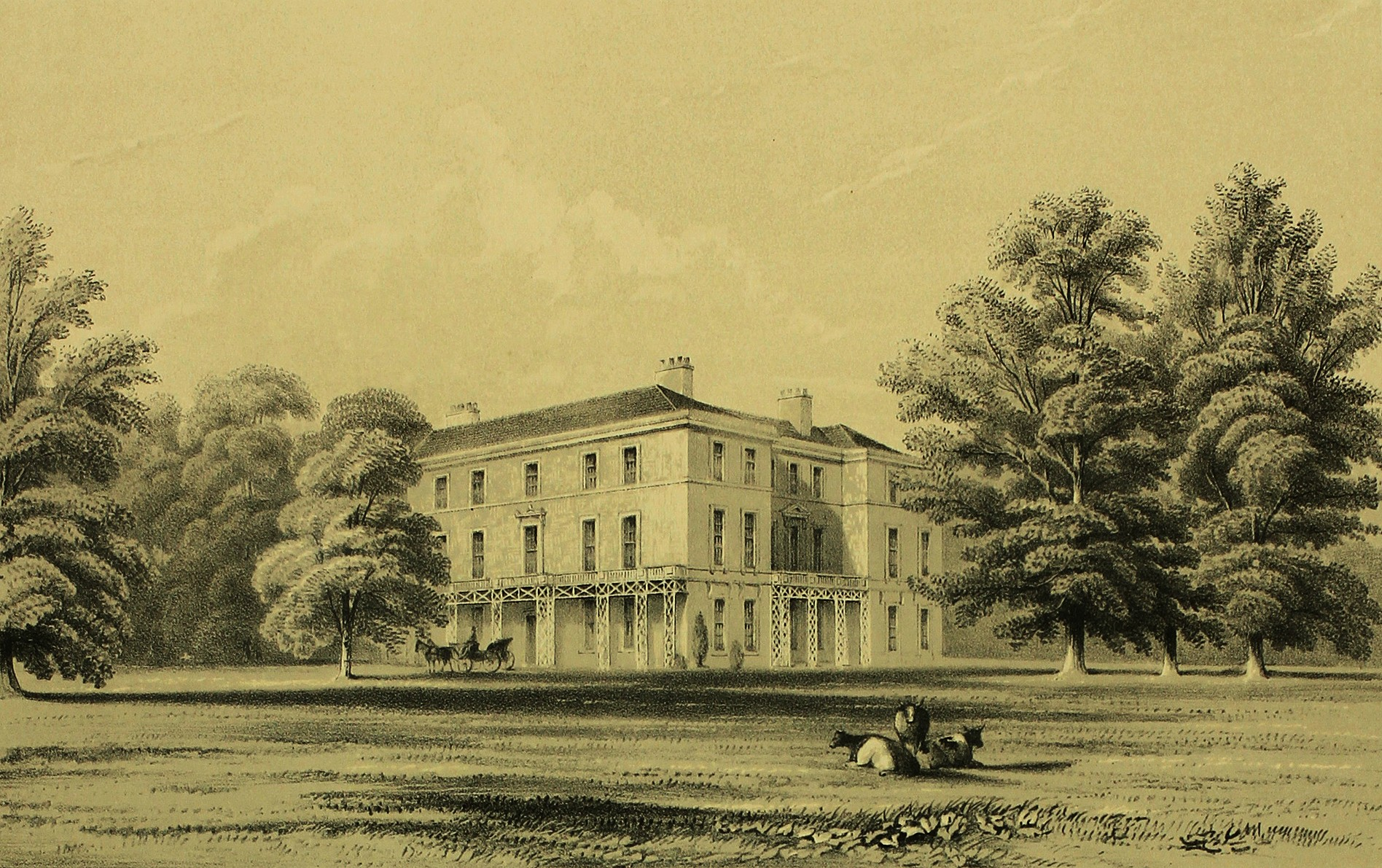
Bradwall Hall, 19th-century drawing

Bradwall is home to three buildings that were Grade II listed from 5 December 1986, though none are open to the public:

The 17th-century cottage and coach-house of the former Bradwall Hall includes a two-story building with three windows, made with brown brickwork and tile roof. Inside are chamfered oak beams, chimney corner (inglenook) and oak supporting beams (bressumer). The coach house is also oak framed with brown brick and roof tiles.

Built around 1700, Plumbtree Farmhouse off Ward's Lane in Bradwall Green is a two-storey building with three windows, built with brown brick.

The Reformatory School and Cottages (1855 datestone) on Walnut Lane, is a two-storey building with three windows, now converted in cottages, that surrounds a rectangular courtyard. The school originally cost £255 to build.

== Transport ==
Canal, rail and road network centred around Bradwall Green in Bradwall parish

=== Roads ===
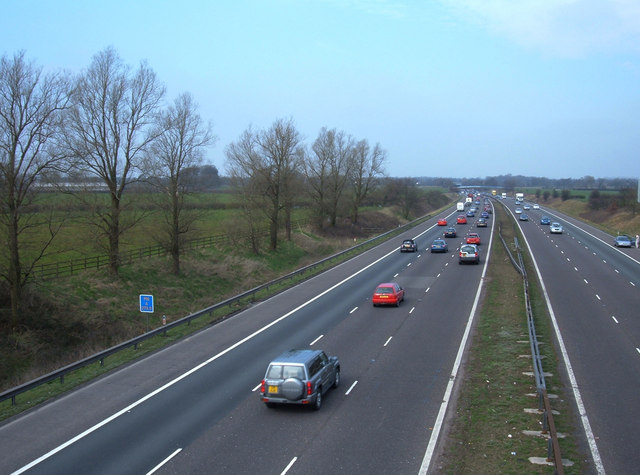
M6 Motorway north of Junction 17 passing through Bradwall

The main road through Bradwall is Bradwall Road, which runs from Middlewich in the northwest, to Sandbach in the South. A 1.5 mi (2.4 km) stretch of the M6 motorway passes through the east of the parish, which is a couple of miles from the M6 Exit 17. Before the motorway was built in the 1960s, and still available to local traffic, Bradwall is served by the A54 Middlewich to Holmes Chapel road to the north, the A50 Holmes Chapel to Arclid in the east, the A534 Arclid to Sandbach to the south, and the A533 Sandbach to Middlewich in the west.

=== Walking ===
There are several public footpaths forming rights of way in Bradwall. For example, a 1.25 mi (2 km) footpath runs from Congleton Road in Sandbach, northwards through the fields and across the Small Brook to Bradwall Manor, and another 1.25 mi (2 km) footpath runs from the end of Vicarage Lane in Elworth, northeastwards across the Small Brook, Wood Lane to Bradwall Lane near the junction of Pillar Box Lane.

=== Nearby transport ===
Manchester International Airport is about 25 mi (40 km) from Bradwall. A few miles north of Bradwall, RAF Cranage was built during the Second World War, and was operational between 1940 and 1958.

There are no bus services into Bradwall. There nearest services are a couple of miles away in Sandbach.

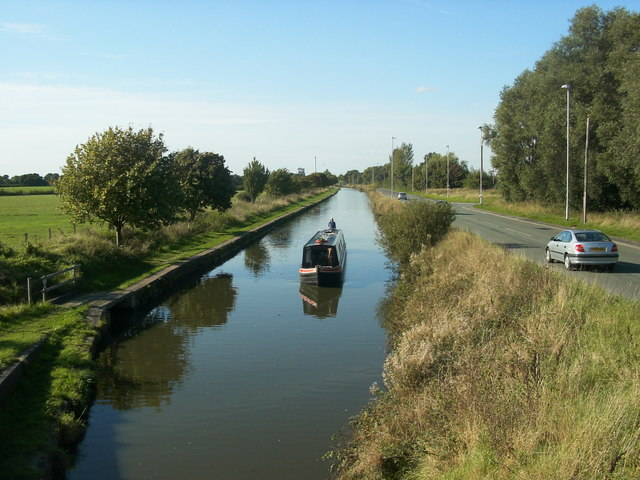
The Trent and Mersey Canal near Bradwall parish

The Trent and Mersey Canal passes about 100 m (330 ft) from the western border of Bradwall. National Cycle Way Route 71 Parkgate to Teggs Nose, Macclesfield, passes about 100 m (330 ft) from the northeast boundary of Bradwall.

Built in 1841, the Crewe to Manchester railway Line passes through Bradwall from southwest to northeast. The parish has no stations of its own, the nearest being Sandbach station in Elworth, about 3 mi (4.8 km) away by road, which runs between Crewe and Manchester. Closing to passengers in 1960, a single freight line between Sandbach via Middlewich railway station and Northwich also just enters Bradwall in the northwest, near the electricity substation in Moston. The closest railway junction is Crewe railway station, serving Chester, Derby, London, Manchester and beyond.

== Governance ==
Bradwall civil parish was originally part of Sandbach Ancient Parish, and was created a separate parish from it in 1867. (Note: A note at the bottom of page 36 reads: The townships of Arclid, Betchton, Blackden, Bradwall, Church Hulme, or Holmes Chapel, Cotton, Cranage, Hassall, Leese, Sandbach, Twemlow and Wheelock, form part of the parish of Sanbach, the remainder of which is in the Northwich Union; total population, 9,046.) It also was part of Nantwich Hundred, Congleton Poor Law Union, Rural Sanitary District, and (after 1866) it formed part of Congleton Rural District until 1974, when it became part of the Borough of Congleton.

In terms of parliamentary representation, the Bradwall area (including the time when it was not a separate civil parish) was in the Cheshire Southern Division from 1832 to 1867; in the Cheshire Mid Division, from 1867 to 1885; in the Eddisbury Division, from 1885 to 1918; in the Northwich Division, from 1918 to 1948; from 1948 it was in Knutsford County Constituency, but it is currently in Congleton Parliament Constituency, represented by Mrs Fiona Bruce MP. The local polling station is Bradwall Village Hall.

One of 112 Local Councils in Cheshire East, Bradwall Parish Council is currently chaired by Greg Gnyp.

== Education ==
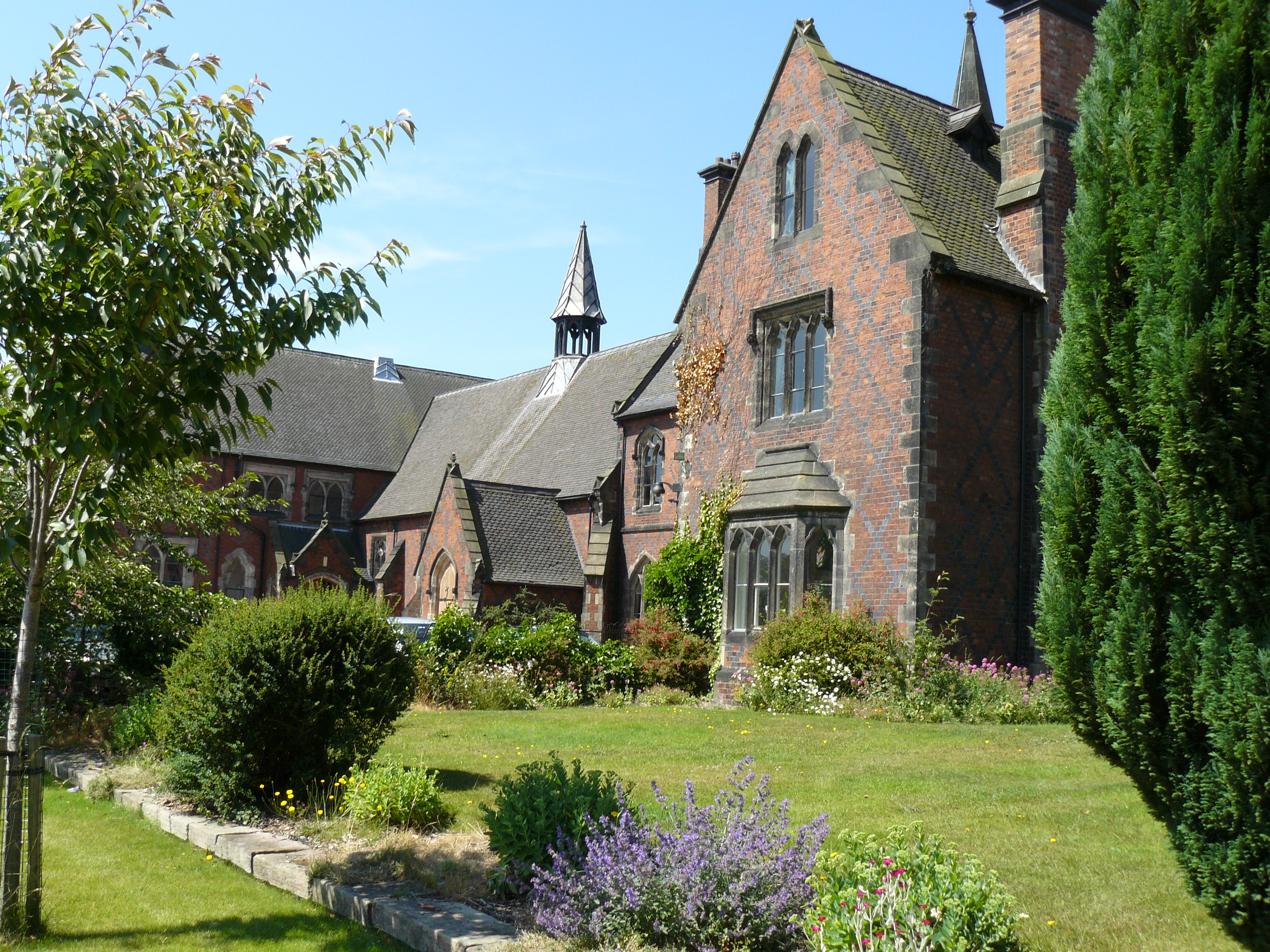
Sandbach School House, serving Bradwall

There are no schools in Bradwall parish, so it falls into the Offley and Sandbach School Admission Catchment areas, which determines the nearest appropriate school. The primary school for the area is Offley Primary School (about 2 mi (3.2 km) away). A 2011 OFSTED report noted that this is a larger-than-average-sized school, whose overall effectiveness was graded as "good", an improvement by one grade over the previous inspection in 2008. The secondary schools are Sandbach High School and Sixth Form College for girls, and Sandbach School for the boys. Both are independent schools that have converted to academy status. 2008 OFSTED reports gave each school a top Grade 1 "Outstanding" rating. The local Voluntary Aided (Catholic) school is St Mary's Catholic Primary School in Middlewich, which a 2011 Ofsted reports noted as "Satisfactory", and the local Voluntary Aided (C of E) school is Brereton Church of England Primary School, which a 2011 Ofsted report stated as "Good". The nearest college is South Cheshire College, and the nearest university is Manchester Metropolitan University's Institute of Education, both in Crewe.

== Religious sites ==
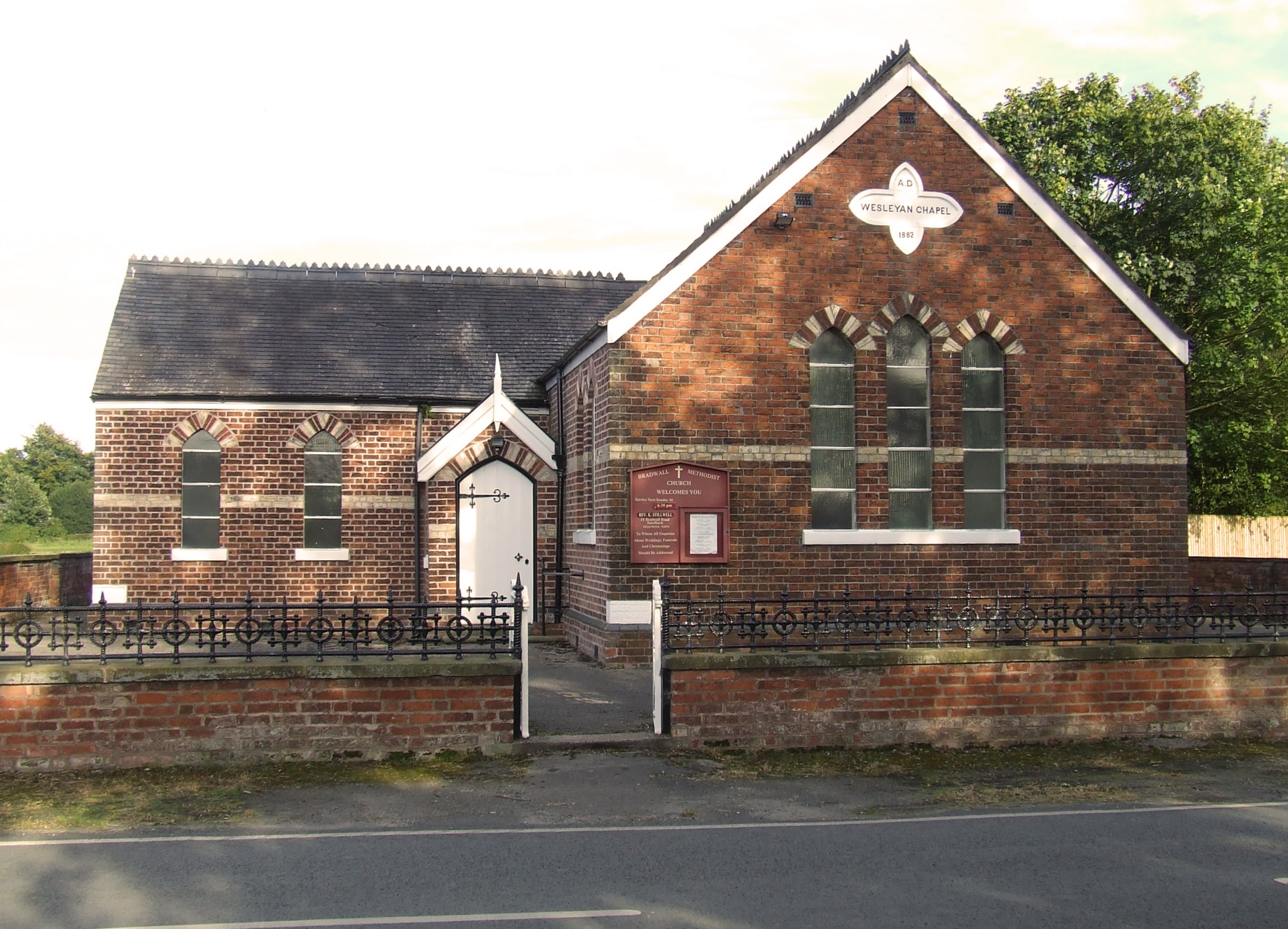
Bradwall Methodist Church, built 1882

Built in 1882, Bradwall's only place of worship is the Wesleyan Chapel Methodist Church on Ward's Lane. The church is one of four in the Sandbach Mission Area (the others are in Sandbach, Sandbach Heath and Wheelock), and services are held fortnightly on Sunday. The minister is the Rev'd Kim Stilwell. Historic Minutes, financial and administrative records between 1882 and 1928 are held at the Cheshire Record Office. In 1982, the Chapel celebrated its centenary.

St Mary's Church in Sandbach has a chancel that belonged to Bradwall Hall, and includes the arms of Oldfield. Once called the Bradwall Chancel or Bradwall Chapel, it is not called the Chapter House, "Church records state that Philip Oldfield of Bradwall had a confirmation of his right to this chapel from the Bishop of Chester on 8 October 1589.

== Notable people ==
Edwin Foden, (1841–1911), was a vehicle manufacturer who founded Foden Trucks and Fodens Motor Works Band. He died at his home, Elworth House, then in Bradwall parish. Other members of the family business included his sons, William Foden (1868–1964) and Edwin Richard Foden (1870–1950), who were born at Bradwall Green, and Foden senior's business partner, George Hancock (c. 1823), who was a neighbour on Foundry Street, Bradwall in 1871.

== Services ==
Public utilities to Bradwall Parish County are served by Scottish Power Manweb regional electricity company, the North West gas network (a gas pipeline passes through Bradwall along the route of the M6 motorway,) and water is provided by Severn Trent Water.

There is no cable TV available in the area, but like the rest of country, Sky TV is available by satellite. FreeView digital TV is transmitted from the Winter Hill transmitter 33.5 mi (53.9 km) away, and is part of the Granada television region.

The local telephone exchange is Sandbach (code WMSBH), with several companies providing a variety of Internet broadband services, including Broadband ADSL since 2000, and Broadband ADSL Max since 2006 (estimated speed 3.5Mb). Mobile phone services with 2G and 3G are available from the major networks. A 15m UTMS mobile phone mast operated by 3 is on Brindley Lane, and a 23.5 m (77 ft) GSM mast operated by Network Rail on Wood Lane.

Bradwall is policed by Middlewich and Holmes Chapel Neighbourhood Policing Team, part of Cheshire Constabulary police force. Crime rates are low, with just two crimes reported throughout 2011.

== See also ==
- Listed buildings in Bradwall
- Nearby towns and villages: Arclid, Brereton, Congleton, Crewe, Elworth, Kinderton, Middlewich, Sandbach and Wheelock
