= Coombes Valley RSPB reserve =

Nature reserve in Staffordshire, England

Coordinates: 53.06974°N 1.99399°W

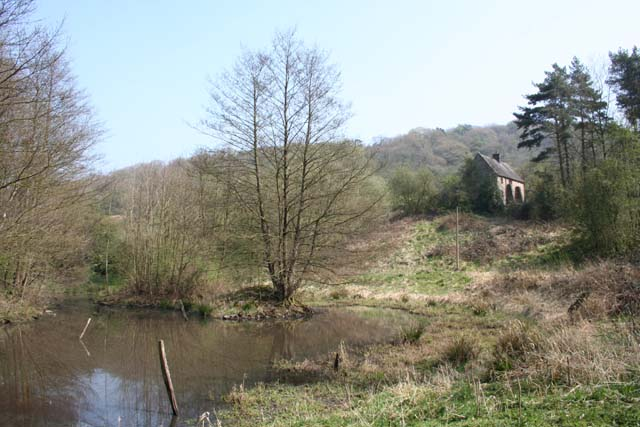
View from the bird hide in RSPB Coombes Valley reserve

Coombes Valley RSPB reserve (grid reference SK005525) is a nature reserve, run by the RSPB, near the town of Leek in Staffordshire, England. It is best known for its breeding woodland birds, including common redstart, wood warbler and pied flycatcher. It is also home to the nationally scarce argent and sable moth, a priority species in the UK's Biodiversity Action Plan.

The Combes Brook flows through the valley on its way to the River Churnet.
