= Kinderton =

Former civil parish in Cheshire, England

Coordinates: 53.169°N 2.403°W

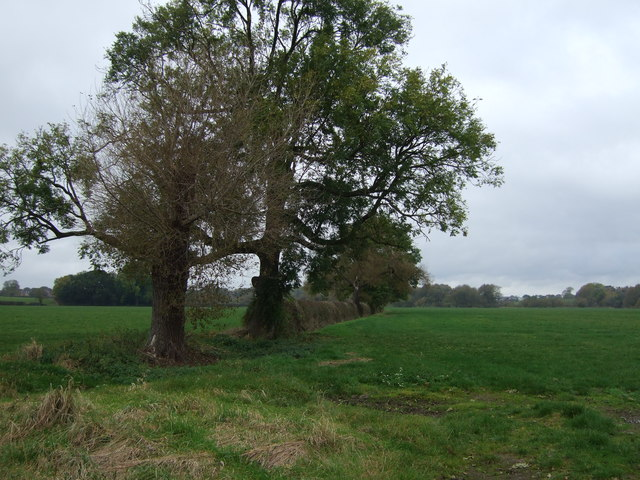
- Hedgerow in the former parish

- Location within Cheshire
- District: Cheshire East; Cheshire West and Chester
- Ceremonial county: Cheshire
- Region: North West
- Country: England
- Sovereign state: United Kingdom

Kinderton is an electoral ward and former civil parish in Middlewich, Cheshire, England.

== History ==
Kinderton was also historically the name of a township in Middlewich on the opposite side of the River Croco from the current ward.

In the Imperial Gazetteer of England and Wales (1870–72) John Marius Wilson described Kinderton:

KINDERTON-WITH-HULME, a township in Middlewich parish, Cheshire; immediately E of the town of Middlewich. Acres, 1, 637. Real property, £3, 936; of which £110 are in gas works-Pop., 477. Houses, 101. The manor belonged anciently to the Venables, passed to the Vernons, and belongs now to J. F. France, Esq. A house erected by the Minshalls is here, and bears date 1616. Kinderton is generally believed to be the Condate of the Romans; a Roman road, called Kind street or King street, went from it to Manchester; and other roads went hence to Chesterton, Wroxeter, Chester, and Warrington. A Danish camp of 10 acres is at Harbours Field, between the rivers Croco and Dane.

On 30 September 1894 Kinderton became civil parish, being formed from Kinderton cum Hulme, on 1 April 1936 the parish was abolished and merged with Sproston, Middlewich, Bradwall, Tetton, Byley, Stanthorne and Wimboldsley. In 1931 the parish had a population of 432.
