= St Mary's Creative Space =

Former church in Cheshire, England

Coordinates: 53.1863°N 2.8911°W

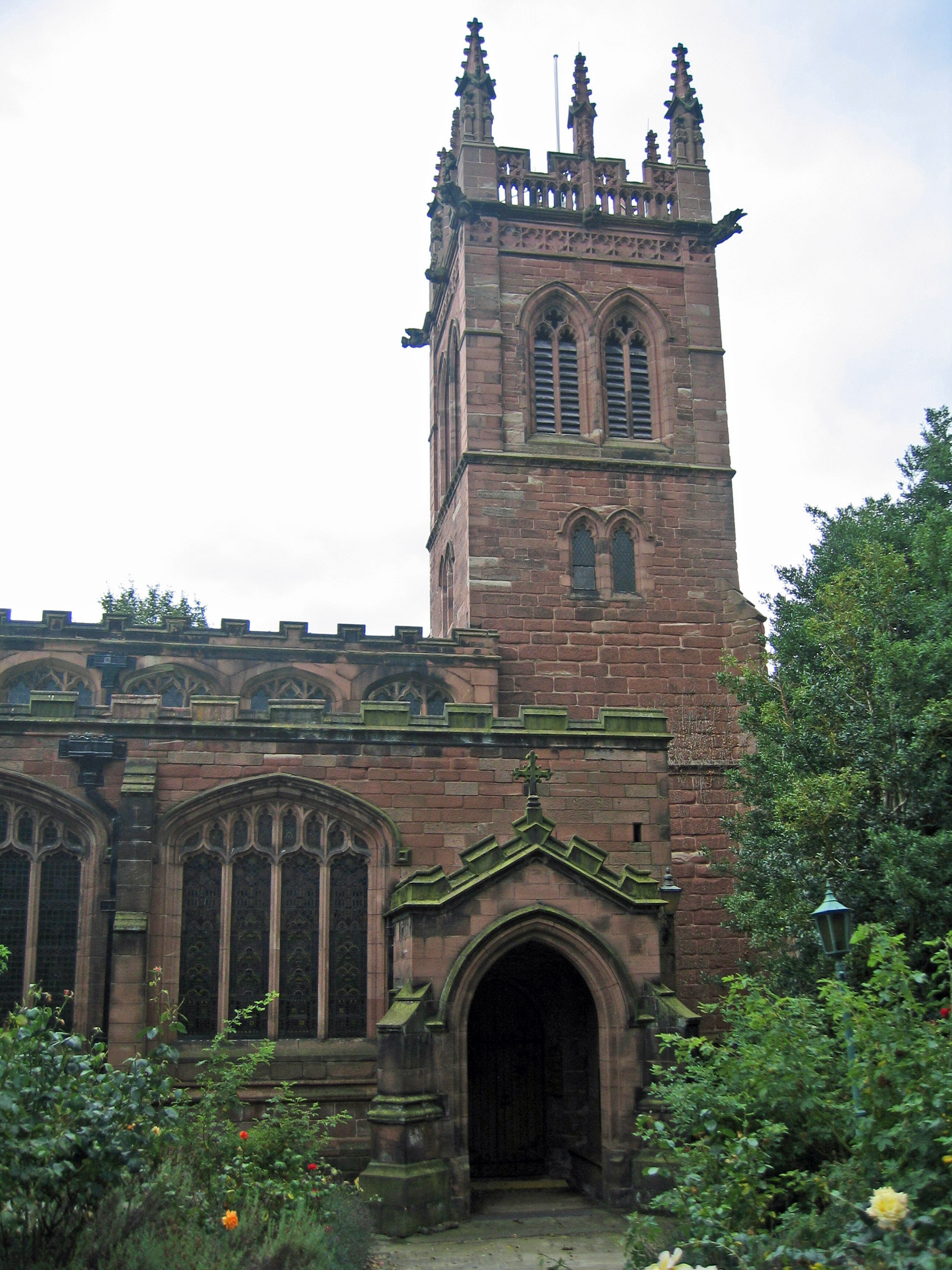
- St Mary's Creative Space, Chester

- Location in Cheshire
- OS grid reference: SJ 404,658
- Location: Chester, Cheshire
- Country: England
- Denomination: Anglican

History
- Former name(s): Church of St Mary-on-the-Hill, Chester
- Status: Redundant

Architecture
- Functional status: Educational centre
- Heritage designation: Grade I
- Designated: 28 June 1955
- Architect(s): James Harrison; J. P. Seddon
- Architectural type: Church
- Style: Gothic
- Completed: 1892
- Closed: 1972

Specifications
- Materials: Red sandstone

St Mary's Creative Space, formerly the Church of St Mary-on-the-Hill, stands at the top of St Mary's Hill, Chester, Cheshire, England, near Chester Castle. It is recorded in the National Heritage List for England as a designated Grade I listed building. The church stands at the top of a narrow winding lane which leads down to the River Dee, and it is adjacent to Chester Castle. In the 1970s the church was converted into an educational centre. It is currently available for use as a concert and exhibition venue and the Chester Music Society hold many concerts there throughout the year. The venue is programmed by Theatre in the Quarter, and hosts a variety of art and cultural events, from homegrown Cestrian performers, national and international acts.

== History ==
The original church on the site was Norman and it served the castle. The present church dates from the 14th and 15th centuries. The south chapel was built around 1443 and was owned by the Earl of Shrewsbury. It was damaged in 1645 during the Civil War and collapsed in 1661. It was rebuilt in 1693. During the Jacobite rising of 1745 the upper stage of the tower was demolished by Lord Cholmondeley in order to provide a clear line of fire. The church was restored in 1861–62 by James Harrison and in 1890–92 by J. P. Seddon. The north porch was rebuilt in 1892 in memory of Randle Holme III. The aisle roofs were rebuilt in the 1930s. The church closed in 1972.

== Architecture ==
=== Exterior ===
The church is built in red sandstone. Its plan consists of a three-stage west tower, a three-bay nave with clerestory, north and south aisles, a chancel with north and south chapels, a north porch and a two-storey south porch. The tower is in three stages; the lower two stages date from the 16th century and the third stage was added in the 19th century. On its north wall is a Tudor doorway. The arcades of the nave are also Tudor. The northeast chapel is St Katherine's Chapel and the southeast is the Troutbeck Chapel.

=== Interior ===
All the furnishings have been removed. The interior of the church is Perpendicular in style, other than the tower arch and the chancel arch which are both in the Decorated style. On the east wall are traces of a wall painting and a pre-Reformation stoup. The medieval roof is camber beam in type, divided into panels and richly carved with many bosses. The east window dated 1857 and stained glass in the south chapel are by William Wailes. In the east window of the north chapel are the remains of a Crimean War memorial by George Hedgeland dating from around 1856.

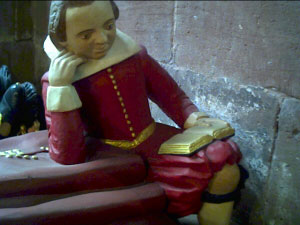
Effigy on the Gamul tomb showing their son Francis reading a book

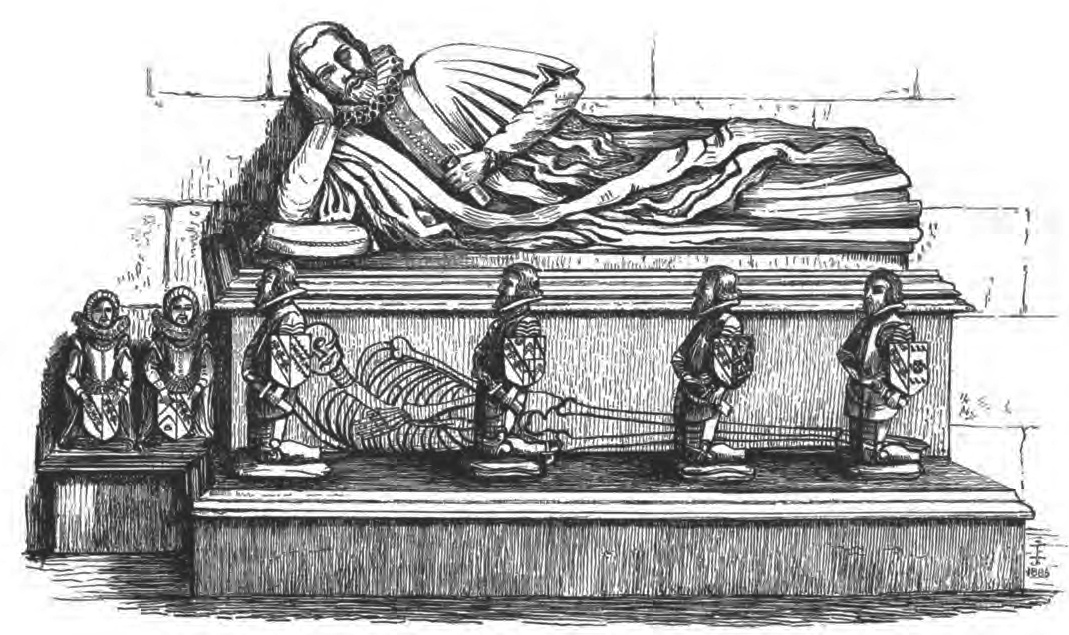
Effigy of Philip Oldfield of Bradwall, effigy in the Church of St Mary-on-the-Hill, Chester. Ref. Earwaker, (1890) (page 133)

In the church are 72 monuments and cenotaphs dating from the 16th century to the early 20th century. Examples of these include the tomb of Philip Oldfield of Bradwall, a barrister who died in 1616, in St Katherine's Chapel. His effigy shows him lying on his right side and on the sarcophagus below is a skeleton in a similar posture, and kneeling figures of four sons and two daughters. Another tomb shows effigies of Thomas Gamul, who also died in 1616, and his wife, at whose feet their son, Francis, sits reading a book. On the side of the tomb are images of Francis' three sisters and the family coat of arms. A wall monument in the north aisle carries inscriptions to four members of the Randle Holme family, memorial painters. A large Gothic tablet to the memory of William Currie, who died in 1834, is by James Harrison. There is a ring of eight bells. Three of these are by John Scott and dated 1657. The others are a bell dated 1783 by John Rudhall, three bells dated 1895 by John Warner and Sons and a bell dated 1939 by John Taylor and Company. The parish registers begin in 1628 with fragmentary transcripts going back to 1547. The churchwardens' accounts start in 1536.

== See also ==
- Grade I listed churches in Cheshire
- Grade I listed buildings in Cheshire West and Chester
- List of works by James Harrison
