= High Sheriff of Cheshire =

Ceremonial official of the English county of Cheshire

This is a list of Sheriffs (and after 1 April 1974, High Sheriffs) of Cheshire.

Arms of Cheshire

The Sheriff is the oldest secular office under the Crown. Formerly the Sheriff was the principal law enforcement officer in the county but over the centuries most of the responsibilities associated with the post have been transferred elsewhere or are now defunct, so that its functions are now largely ceremonial. Under the provisions of the Local Government Act 1972, on 1 April 1974 the office previously known as Sheriff was retitled High Sheriff. The High Sheriff is appointed annually, taking office in March. As of 2022, the High Sheriff of Cheshire is Jeannie France-Hayhurst.

== List of Sheriffs of Cheshire ==
- c.1151: Ranulph
- c.1184: Gilbert Pipard or de Arden
- c.1185–1187: Bertram de Verdon
- 1189: Richard de Pierpoint
- 1199: Lidulph de Twemlow

=== 1200–1399 ===
- 1200: Lidulph de Twemlow and Croxton
- 1204: Lidulph de Twemlow
- c.1208: Lidulph
- Joceram de Hellesby
- William Thebaud
- c.1219: Richard de Pierrepont
- bef. 1226: Richard Davenport
- c.1228–1230: Richard de Sandbach
- c.1233–1236: Richard de Wybunbury
- 10 July 1237: John de Lacy, 2nd Earl of Lincoln
- Richard Parvus
- 1239: Richard de Wybunbury
- 6 December 1240: John le Strange or Extraneus
- c.1243–1244: Richard de Wybunbury
- c.1247–1248: Richard Bernard
- c.1252: David de Malpas
- c.1262: Robert Buckley
- 1263: Stephen Clerk
- c.1266: Robert de Huxley
- 1267: Jordan de Puleston
- c.1268: Thomas Dutton
- c.1269: Randal de Sidington
- c.1270–1271: Richard de Wilburham
- c.1272–1274: Hugh de Hatton
- 16 October 1274: Gunselm de Badlesmere (or Joscelin)
- c.1277: Patrick de Haselwall
- 1278: Richard de Massey
- 1279: William de Haworthyn
- 1281: William de Spurstow
- 1283–1287: Robert le Grosvenor, of Hulme
- 29 September 1287: William de Praeres, of Brindley
- 1292: David de Egerton of Malpas
- 1293: Richard de Bradwell
- c. 1294: James de Poole
- c.1295: Philip de Egerton, of Malpas
- 29 September 1296: William de Praeres
- 29 September 1301: Sir Robert de Bresey
- 29 September 1306: Richard de Fouleshurst, of Crewe
- 1307: Robert le Grosvenor, of Hulme and Lostock
- 1308: Richard de Fouleshurst
- 11 April 1309: Robert de Bulkeley
- 24 October 1309: Payn Tiptoft
- 1309: Philip de Egerton
- 1310: Richard de Whiteley
- 1311–1319: Richard de Fouleshurst
- 1312: David de Egerton
- 1319: William de Mobberley
- 17 December 1326: John de Wrenbury
- 29 November 1328: Oliver de Ingham
- 1329: John de Wrenbury
- 1331: Robert de Praeres
- 1332: William de Praeres
- c.1332: David de Egerton
- 1333: Robert de Praeres
- 30 September 1335: Adam le Parker
- 29 September 1336: Henry de Ferrers
- c. 1337: John de Wrenbury
- 30 September 1341: Randle de Adlington
- 29 September 1342: Robert de Bulkeley
- Hugh del Hogh
- 29 September 1347: Nicholas de Rugeley
- 25 June 1348: Sir James de Audley
- Robert de Elleford
- 1349: Sir William de Praeres
- 29 September 1350: Thomas Daniell or Danyers, of Tabley
- 19 August 1353: Sir Thomas de Dutton
- 30 September 1359: Thomas le Yonge, of Shelvock
- 29 September 1361: Richard de Whiteley
- 30 June 1367: John Scolehall, Escheater of Chester
- 29 September 1370: Sir Lawrence de Dutton
- 1375–1377: Richard de Legh
- 6 July 1376: Lawrence de Dutton
- 27 October 1377: Sir Hugh Venables
- 18 February 1383: Sir Nicholas de Vernon
- 1384: Thomas Dubois
  - 10 October 1385: Richard Venables, undersheriff
- 20 October 1385: Hugh, 2nd Earl of Stafford
  - 10 January 1387: Richard Venables, undersheriff
- 15 March 1387: Ralph Egerton
- 30 September 1387: Sir Nicholas Vernon
- 1388: John de Massey, of Tatton
- 1389: Sir Robert le Grosvenor
- 14 October 1393: Sir Robert de Legh, of Adlington
- 4 August 1394: Sir Robert le Grosvenor
- 12 February 1397: Sir Robert de Legh

=== 1400–1499 ===
- 29 September 1400: Sir John Massey, of Puddington
- 29 September 1401: Henry Ravenscroft, of Bretton
- 18 September 1403: John Mainwaring, of Peover
- 6 December 1408: Sir William Brereton, of Brereton
- 14 January 1412: Sir Laurence Merbury
- 12 September 1414: John Legh, of Norbury Booths
- 20 October 1421: Hugh Dutton, of Dutton
- 8 November 1424: Richard Warburton, of Arley
- 12 January 1428: Randal Brereton, of Brereton
- 2 September 1438: John Troutbeck
- 10 July 1439: Sir Robert Booth, of Dunham Massey (jointly from 1443, died 1460)
- 8 March 1443: Sir William Booth (son of Sir Robert) (jointly to 1460)
- 16 January 1463: William Stanley, of Hooton (died 1466)
- 26 February 1466: Sir William Stanley
- 6 March 1489: William Stanley (son of Sir William)
- 24 January 1492: Thomas Stanley
- 6 April 1495: Sir John Warburton, of Warburton and Arley

=== 1500–1599 ===
- 1 September 1502: Sir John Warburton
- 4 April 1504: Sir John Warburton
  - 1506: Sir Ralph Birkenhead, Recorder of Chester (under-sheriff)
- 19 July 1508: Sir John Warburton (for life)
- 8 April 1524: Thomas Warburton, of Warburton and Arley
- 24 September 1524: Sir George Holford, of Holford
- 20 February 1526: Sir William Stanley, of Hooton
- 19 December 1526: Sir William Venables, of Kinderton
- 30 November 1527: Sir William de la Pole
- 19 December 1528: Sir Thomas Fouleshurst, of Nantwich
- 19 November 1529: Sir John Done, of Utkinton
- 1530: Sir Peter Warburton of Arley
- 24 November 1531: Sir Edward Fitton, of Gawsworth
- 8 December 1532: Sir George Paulet
- 14 November 1537: Sir Henry Delves, of Doddington
- 28 November 1538: Sir Robert Needham, of Cranage and Shavington
- 30 November 1539: Sir Alexander Radcliffe, of Ordsall
- 17 November 1540: Sir Edmund Trafford, of Trafford
- 27 November 1541: Sir John Holcroft, of Holcroft
- 22 November 1542: Sir Piers Dutton, of Dutton
- 23 November 1543: Sir Edward Fitton, of Gawsworth
- 1544: Sir Thomas Venables, of Kinderton
- 22 November 1545: Sir Henry Delves, of Doddington
- 23 November 1546: Sir John Holcroft, of Holcroft
- 27 November 1547: Sir Hugh Cholmondeley, of Cholmondeley
- 3 December 1548: Sir William Brereton, of Brereton
- 12 November 1549: Thomas Aston, of Aston
- 11 November 1550: Sir John Savage, of Rocksavage
- 11 November 1551: Sir Lawrence Smith, of Hough
- 10 November 1552: Sir William Brereton, of Brereton
- 26 August 1553: Sir Peter Legh, of Lyme
- 14 November 1554: Sir Hugh Cholmondeley, of Cholmondeley
- 14 November 1555: Richard Wilbraham, of Woodhey
- 13 November 1556: Sir Thomas Venables, of Kinderton
- 16 November 1557: Sir Philip Egerton, of Egerton
- 23 November 1558: Sir Edward Fitton, of Gawsworth
- 9 November 1559: Sir John Savage, of Rocksavage
- 12 November 1560: Sir Ralph Egerton, of Wrinehill
- 8 November 1561: Sir John Warburton, of Arley
- 19 November 1562: Richard Brooke, of Norton
- 8 November 1563: William Massey, of Podington
- 9 November 1564: Sir John Savage, of Rocksavage
- 16 November 1565: Sir Hugh Cholmondeley, of Cholmondeley
- 18 November 1566: Sir Lawrence Smith, of Hough and Hatherton
- 18 November 1567: Ralph Done, of Flaxyards
- 18 November 1568: George Calveley, of Lea
- 12 November 1569: Sir John Savage, of Rocksavage
- 13 November 1570: Sir William Booth, of Dunham Massey
- 14 November 1571: Thomas Stanley, of Alderley
- 13 November 1572: Sir Hugh Cholmondeley, of Cholmondeley
- 10 November 1573: Sir John Savage, of Rocksavage
- 15 November 1574: Henry Mainwaring, of Kermincham
- 15 November 1575: Sir Rowland Stanley, of Hooton
- 13 November 1576: John Warren, of Poynton
- 27 November 1577: Thomas Brooke, of Norton
- 17 November 1578: Sir John Savage, of Rocksavage
- 23 November 1579: Sir Ralph Egerton, of Wrinehill
- 21 November 1580: Sir George Calveley, of Lea
- 27 November 1581: William Brereton, of Brereton
- 5 December 1582: Sir Peter Warburton, of Arley
- 25 November 1583: William Leversage, of Wheelock
- 19 November 1584: Thomas Wilbraham, of Woodhey
- 22 November 1585: Hugh Calveley, of Lea
- 14 November 1586: Randle Davenport, of Henbury
- 4 December 1587: Thomas Legh, of Adlington
- 25 November 1588: Sir Hugh Cholmondeley, of Cholmondeley
- 24 November 1589: William Brereton, of Handforth
- 24 November 1590: Sir John Savage, of Rocksavage
- 25 November 1591: Thomas Brooke, of Norton
- 16 November 1592: Thomas Venables, of Kinderton
- 26 November 1593: Peter Warburton, of Arley
- 21 November 1594: Peter Legh, of Lyme
- 29 November 1595: John Done, of Utkinton
- 22 November 1596: Sir George Booth, of Dunham Massey
- 15 November 1597: Sir Edward Warren, of Poynton
- 28 November 1598: Sir Thomas Holcroft, of Vale Royal
- 2 December 1599: Sir Thomas Smith, of Hatherton

=== 1600–1699 ===
- 24 November 1600: Thomas Aston, of Aston
- 2 December 1601: Richard Grosvenor, of Eaton
- 7 December 1602: Sir George Leycester, of Toft
- 1 December 1603: Sir William Davenport, of Bramall
- 5 November 1604: Sir Randall Mainwaring, of Peover
- 2 February 1606: Sir Thomas Vernon, of Haslington
- 17 November 1606: Sir John Savage, of Rocksavage
- 9 November 1607: Sir Henry Bunbury, of Stanney
- 12 November 1608: William Brereton, of Brereton and Ashley
- 8 November 1609: Geoffrey Shakerley, of Hulme
- c. November 1610: Thomas Dutton, of Dutton
- c. November 1611: Sir William Brereton, of Brereton and Ashley
- c. November 1612: Sir Urian Legh, of Adlington
- c. November 1613: Sir George Calveley, of Lea
- c. November 1614: Sir Richard Lee Bt, of Lee and Darnhall
- 6 November 1615: Sir Richard Wilbraham, of Woodhey
- 12 April 1617: Sir John Davenport, of Davenport
- c. November 1617: Ralph Calveley, of Saighton
- c. November 1618: Sir Randall Mainwaring, of Over Peover
- c. November 1619: Sir Robert Cholmondeley Bt, of Cholmondeley
- 9 December 1620: Thomas Marbury, of Marbury
- 16 November 1621: Sir George Booth, 1st Baronet, of Dunham Massey
- c. November 1622: Sir Thomas Smith, of Hatherton
- c. November 1623: Sir Richard Grosvenor, 1st Baronet, of Eaton
- 3 December 1624: Sir Thomas Brereton, of Wolvesacre
- c. November 1625: Sir John Done, of Utkinton
- c. November 1626: John Calveley, of Saighton
- 7 November 1627: Sir Edward Stanley Bt, of Bickerstaffe
- c. November 1628: Thomas Legh, of Adlington
- c. November 1629: Peter Dutton, of Hatton
- 7 November 1630: Thomas Stanley, of Alderley
- c. November 1631: Richard Brereton, of Ashley
- c. November 1632: Sir Edward Fitton Bt, of Gawsworth
- 10 November 1633: Peter Venables, of Kinderton
- 5 November 1634: Sir Thomas Aston, 1st Baronet, of Aston
- c. November 1635: William Legh, of Norbury Booths
- 3 October 1636: Sir Thomas Delves Bt, of Doddington
- 30 September 1637: Thomas Cholmondeley, of Vale Royal
- 4 November 1638: Philip Mainwaring, of Peover
- c. November 1639: Sir Thomas Powell, of Birkenhead
- 15 November 1640: John Bellot, of Moreton
- 31 December 1641: Hugh Calveley, of Lea
- c. November 1642: Thomas Legh, of Adlington
- 1 December 1643: Richard Grosvenor, of Eaton
- 30 December 1643: Henry Brooke, of Norton
- 31 January 1645: Robert Tatton, of Wythenshawe
- c. November 1646: Henry Brooke, of Norton
- 17 November 1647: Roger Wilbraham, of Dorfold
- 15 February 1649: Robert Dukinfield, of Dukinfield
- 30 October 1649: Sir John Seale
- 7 November 1649: Sir Henry Delves, of Doddington
- 7 November 1650: Edmund Jodrell, of Yeardsley and Twemlow
- 4 November 1651: John Crew, of Crewe
- 12 November 1652: Peter Dutton, of Hatton
- 10 November 1653: George Warburton, of Arley
- c. November 1654: Sir Philip Egerton, of Oulton
- 1657: Sir Thomas Mainwaring, 1st Baronet, of Over Peover
- 1658–1660: John Legh, of Norbury Booths
- 28 June 1660: Sir Thomas Cholmondeley, of Holford
- 5 November 1660: Thomas Cholmondeley, of Vale Royal
- 30 November 1661: Thomas Legh, of Adlington
- 29 November 1662: Sir John Bellot, 1st Baronet of Moreton
- 6 November 1663: Sir Thomas Wilbraham, 3rd Baronet, of Woodhey
- 26 November 1664: Sir Thomas Delves, 3rd Baronet, of Doddington
- 12 November 1665: Sir John Arden, of Alvanley
- 7 November 1666: John Crew
- 15 November 1666: Sir Richard Brooke, 2nd Baronet, of Norton
- 6 November 1667: Roger Wilbraham, of Deerfold
- 6 November 1668: Sir Peter Brooke, of Mere
- 11 November 1669: Roger Wilbraham, of Nantwich
- 4 November 1670: Edmund Jodrell, of Yeldersley and Twemlow
- 9 November 1671: William Lawton, of Lawton
- 11 November 1672: Thomas Touchet, of Nether Whitley
- 12 November 1673: Thomas Bunbury, of Stanney
- 5 November 1674: Thomas Stephens, of Kinnerton
- 12 November 1674: Sir Philip Egerton
- 12 December 1674: Sir Robert Dukinfield, 1st Baronet, of Dukinfield
- 15 November 1675: Richard Walthall, of Wistaston
- 10 November 1676: John Davies, of Manley
- 15 November 1677: Sir James Bradshaw, of Bromborough
- 17 November 1677: Sir Peter Stanley Bt, of Alderley
- 14 November 1678: Sir James Bradshaw, of Bromborough
- 13 November 1679: Edward Legh, of Baguley
- 4 November 1680: Sir Willoughby Aston, 2nd Baronet, of Aston
- 10 November 1681: Sir Peter Pindar, of Iddinshall
- 13 November 1682: Peter Wilbraham, of Dorfold
- 12 November 1683: James Davenport, of Bramall
- 20 November 1684: Henry Davies, of Ashton and Manley
- 25 November 1686: Robert Cholmondeley
- 6 December 1687: Thomas Legh, of Adlington
- 8 November 1688: Sir Thomas Grosvenor, 3rd Baronet, of Eaton
- 18 March 1689: Sir Philip Egerton, of Oulton
- 11 April 1689: Sir Peter Warburton Bt, of Warburton and Arley
- 22 April 1689: Thomas Powell, of Birkenhead
- 15 July 1689: Roger Mainwaring, of Kermincham
- 18 November 1689: John Bruen
- 27 November 1690: Sir Willoughby Aston, 2nd Baronet, of Aston
- 14 December 1691: Peter Legh, of Norbury Booths
- 17 November 1692: Sir William Clegg, of Gayton
- 16 November 1693: William Davenport, of Bramall
- 6 December 1694: Richard Legh, of East Hall, High Legh
- 5 December 1695: Thomas Delves, of Doddington
- 16 December 1695: Charles Hurleston, of Newton
- 3 December 1696: William Whitmore, of Thurstaston
- 16 December 1697: Thomas Delves, of Doddington
- 30 December 1697: Thomas Legh, of Darnhall
- 22 December 1698: Thomas Delves, of Ordsall
- 20 November 1699: Jonathan Bruen, of Bruen
- 23 November 1699: Sir Henry Bunbury, of Stanney

=== 1700–1799 ===
- 28 November 1700: Lawrence Wright, of Mobberley and Mottram
- 1 January 1702: John Davenport, of Woodford
- 3 December 1702: Sir John Chetwode Bt, of Whitley
- 2 December 1703: John Baskerville, of Withington
- 21 December 1704: John Legh, of Adlington
- 3 December 1705: Sir Francis Leicester Bt, of Tabley
- 14 November 1706: Edmund Swetenham, of Somerford Booths
- 20 November 1707: Sir Samuel Daniell, of Tabley
- 29 November 1708: William Domville, of Lymm
- 1 December 1709: Clutton Wright, of Nantwich
- 24 November 1710: John Anson, of Lees
- 13 December 1711: Joseph Lynch, Alderman of Chester
- 10 January 1712: John Leche, of Carden
- 11 December 1712: Sir Thomas Cotton, 2nd Baronet, of Combermere
- 30 November 1713: Randle Wilbraham, of Rode
- 16 November 1714: Richard Walthall, of Wistaston
- 22 November 1715: Francis Jodrell, of Jodrell
- 19 November 1716: Richard Alport, of Malpas
- 5 December 1716: James Bayley, of Wistaston
- c. November 1717: John Bramhall, of Hough
- c. November 1718: Samuel Barrow, of Sheppenhall
- c. November 1719: Sir Thomas Brooke Bt, of Norton
- c. November 1720: Edmund Swetenham, of Somerford Booths
- c. November 1721: George Davenport, of Calveley
- 18 January 1723: Sir Thomas Aston Bt, of Aston
- c. November 1723: Edward Downes, of Shrigley
- c. November 1724: John Parker, of Fallows
- c. November 1725: Richard Rutter, of Moor
- c. November 1726: Charles Hurleston, of Newton
- 16 December 1727: Peter Brooke, of Mere
- 18 December 1728: Robert Davies, of Manley
- 16 January 1729: John Spencer, of Huntington
- 1 February 1729: Robert Davies, of Manley
- 18 December 1729: John Daniell, of Daresbury
- 14 December 1730: Edward Warren, of Poynton
- 9 December 1731: William Brock, of Upton
- 14 December 1732: Geoffrey Shakerley, of Shakerley and Somerford
- 11 January 1733: Leigh Page, of Hawthorn
- 20 December 1733: Henry Bennett, of Moston
- 18 December 1735: William Dodd, of Edge
- 4 February 1735: Trafford Barnston, of Churton
- 19 January 1736: Thomas Booth, of Twemlow
- 12 January 1737: William Tatton, of Wythenshawe
- 21 December 1738: Robert Hyde, of Catton Hall
- 27 December 1739: John Spencer, of Huntington
- 7 February 1740: Sir John Byrne Bt, of Stanthorne
- 24 December 1740: William Chesshyre, of Halton
- 31 December 1741: Peter Legh, of Calveley
- 16 December 1742: Philip Egerton, of Oulton
- 5 January 1744: Sir Peter Warburton Bt, of Arley
- 7 February 1745: Thomas Starkey, of Wrenbury
- 7 March 1745: Thomas Hall, of Armitage
- 16 January 1746: Ralph Leycester, of Toft
- 15 January 1747: Charles Legh, of Adlington
- 14 January 1748: Samuel Jervis, of Chester
- 10 February 1748: Edward Green, of Poulton
- 11 January 1749: George Leigh, of Oughtrington
- 17 January 1750: James Croxton, of Guilden Sutton
- 6 December 1750: Sir William Dukinfield Daniell Bt, of Dukinfield
- 14 January 1752: Sir Richard Brooke Bt, of Norton
- 7 February 1753: John Leche, of Carden
- 31 January 1754: Robert Lawton, of Lawton
- 29 January 1755: Thomas Slaughter, of Newton
- 27 January 1756: Thomas Prescot, of Overton
- 4 February 1757: William Robinson, of Whatcroft
- 27 January 1758: John Egerton, of Broxton
- 2 February 1759: Samuel Harrison, of Cranage
- 1 February 1760: Sir Peter Leycester Bt, of Tabley
- 28 January 1761: John Hoghton, of Burgh Hall
- 16 February 1761: John Arden, of Arden
- 15 February 1762: Richard Barry, of Marbury
- 4 February 1763: John Alsager, of Alsager
- 10 February 1764: John Crewe, of Barthomley
- 1 February 1765: John Smith Barry, of Belmont
- 17 February 1766: Peter Brooke, of Mere
- 13 February 1767: Sir Lister Holte Bt, of Brereton
- 15 January 1768: Henry Hervey Aston, of Aston
- 27 January 1769: Philip Egerton, of Oulton
- 9 February 1770: Sir Robert Cunliffe Bt, of Saighton
- 6 February 1771: John Crewe, of Bolesworth
- 17 February 1772: Sir Henry Mainwaring Bt, of Peover
- 8 February 1773: George Wilbraham, of Townsend
- 7 February 1774: William Leche, of Carden
- 6 February 1775: Thomas Patten, of Buerton
- 5 February 1776: John Astley, of Dukinfield
- 31 January 1777: Peter Kyffin Heron, of Moor
- 28 January 1778: William Tatton, of Wythenshawe
- 1 February 1779: John Bower Jodrell, of Henbury and Yeardsley
- 2 February 1780: Samuel Barrow, of Sheppenhall and Carshalton
- 5 February 1781: William Davenport, of Bramall
- 1 February 1782: Sir Peter Warburton Bt, of Warburton
- 10 February 1783: Davies Davenport, of Capesthorne
- 9 February 1784: Thomas Willis, of Swettenham
- 7 February 1785: Wilbraham Tollemache, of Woodhay
- 13 February 1786: Henry Cornwall Legh, of East Hall, High Legh
- 12 February 1787: Sir Richard Brooke Bt, of Norton
- 8 February 1788: John Clegg, of Withington
- 29 April 1789: Sir John Chetwode, 4th Baronet, of Agden
- 29 January 1790: John Arden, of Arden
- 4 February 1791: Charles Watkin John Shakerley, of Somerford
- 3 February 1792: Thomas Cholmondeley, 1st Baron Delamere, of Vale Royal
- 6 February 1793: John Egerton, of Oulton
- 3 February 1794: Domville Poole, of Lymm
- 11 February 1795: James Hugh Smith Barry, of Marbury
- 5 February 1796: Booth Grey, of Wincham
- 1 February 1797: John Leche, of Stretton
- 1 March 1797: Thomas Langford Brooke, of Mere
- 7 February 1798: Robert Hibbert, of Birtles
- 1 February 1799: Joseph Green, of Poulton

=== 1800–1899 ===
- 5 February 1800: Roger Barnston, of Churton
- 11 February 1801: William Rigby, of Oldfield
- 17 March 1801: John Scott Waring, of Ince
- 3 February 1802: Lawrence Wright, of Mottram St. Andrew
- 3 February 1803: John Feilden, of Mollington Hall
- 1 February 1804: Sir John Fleming Leicester, 5th Baronet, of Nether Tabley
- 6 February 1805: George John Legh, of East Hall, High Legh
- 1 February 1806: Francis Duckinfield Astley, of Dukinfield
- 7 February 1806: Sir Henry Mainwaring, 1st Baronet, of Over Peover
- 4 February 1807: Francis Duckinfield Astley, of Dukinfield
- 3 February 1808: Charles Trelawny-Brereton, of Shotwick Park
- 24 February 1808: Robert Barnford, of Upton
- 16 March 1808: William Egerton, of Tatton Park
- 6 February 1809: Thomas William Tatton, of Withenshaw
- 31 January 1810: Robert Viner, of Bidston
- 21 February 1810: Thomas Brook, of Church Minshull
- 8 February 1811: Booth Grey, of Ashton Heys
- 24 January 1812: Edmund Yates, of Ince
- 10 February 1813: Francis Jodrell, of Henbury Hall
- 4 February 1814: John Baskervyle Glegg, of Gayton
- 13 February 1815: John Isherwood, of Marple
- 12 February 1816: Samuel Aldersey, of Aldersey
- 12 February 1817: Sir Richard Brooke, 6th Baronet, of Norton
- 24 January 1818: Henry Charles Aston, of Aston
- 10 February 1819: John Smith Barry, of Marbury
- 12 February 1820: James France France, of Bostock
- 6 February 1821: Thomas Wilson, of Llandican
- 4 February 1822: Charles Wicksted, of Baddeley
- 31 January 1823: James White, of Sale
- 13 January 1824: Peter Langford Brooke, of Mere
- 2 February 1825: John Smith Daintry, of Sutton
- 9 February 1825: John Daintry, of North Rode
- 30 January 1826: William Turner, of Pott Shrigley
- 5 February 1827: Peter Legh, of Norbury Booths
- 13 February 1828: William Massey, of Moston
- 11 February 1829: Lawrence Armitstead, of Cranage
- 2 February 1830: George Walmsley, of Bolesworth Castle
- 31 January 1831: Sir Thomas Stanley-Massey-Stanley, 9th Baronet, of Hooton
- 6 February 1832: John Hurleston Leche, of Carden{
- 1833: Rowland Eyles Egerton Warburton, of Arley
- 1834: William Astley, of Dukinfield Lodge was initially named, but was replaced by Gibbs Craufurd Antrobus, of Eaton
- 1835: Joseph Leigh, of Belmont Hall, was initially named but was replaced by James Heath Leigh, of Grappenhall Lodge, his son.
- 1836: Egerton Leigh, of West Hall, High Legh
- 1837: Charles Peter Shakerley, of Somerford Park, Cheshire
- 1838: George Cornwall Legh, of East Hall, High Legh
- 1839: Thomas Hibbert, of Birtles
- 1840: John Tollemache, of Tilstone Lodge
- 1841: John Ryle, of Henbury Hall
- 1842: Edward Davies Davenport, of Capesthorne
- 1843: John Dixon, of Astle
- 1844: George Wilbraham, of Delamere House
- 1845: Sir William Thomas Stanley Massey Stanley, Bt, of Hooton
- 1846: James Hugh Smith Barry, of Marbury Hall
- 1847: Ralph Gerard Leycester, of Toft Hall
- 1848: Henry Brooke, of The Grange
- 1849: Thomas William Tatton, of Withenshaw
- 1850: Sir Arthur Ingram Aston GCB, of Aston
- 1851: Thomas Marsland, of Henbury Hall
- 1852: George Holland Ackers, of Mereton
- 1853: John Hurleston Leche, of Carden
- 1854: Francis Duckinfield Palmer Astley, of Dukinfield
- 1855: John Chapman, of Hill-End, Mottram in Longdendale
- 1856: Richard Christopher Naylor, of Hooton Hall
- 1857: William Atkinson, of Ashton Hayes, near Kelsall
- 1858: George Fortescue Wilbraham, of Delamere House, near Northwich
- 1859: Arthur Henry Davenport, of Capesthorne Hall
- 1860: Clement Swetenham, of Somerford Booths Hall, near Congleton
- 1861: Edward Holt Clegg, of Backford Hall
- 1862: Thomas Aldersey, of Aldersey Hall
- 1863: Sir Charles Watkin Shakerley, 2nd Baronet, of Somerford Park, Cheshire
- 1864: John Ralph Shaw, of Arrowe Park, Birkenhead
- 1865: Wilbraham Spencer Tollemache, of Dorfold Hall
- 1866: Robert Barbour, of Bolesworth Castle
- 1867: Thomas Henry Lyon, of Appleton Hall, near Warrington
- 1868: John Coutts Antrobus, of Eaton Hall, Congleton
- 1869: Samuel Woodhouse, of Norley Hall, Frodsham
- 1870: Sir Richard Brooke, 7th Baronet, of Norton
- 1871: George Baillie-Hamilton-Arden, 11th Earl of Haddington, of Eaton Bank
- 1872: Egerton Leigh, of Jodrell Hall
- 1873: Gilbert Greenall, of Walton Hall
- 1874: Sir Edward William Watkin, of Rose Hill
- 1875: Richard Barton, of Caldy Manor, Birkenhead
- 1876: John Baskervyle Clegg, of Withington Hall, Chelford
- 1877: Thomas Unett Brocklehurst, of Henbury Hall
- 1878: Philip Stapleton Humberston, of Glan-y-Wern, near Denbigh
- 1879: Charles Hosken France-Hayhurst, of Bostock Hall, Middlewich
- 1880: Cudworth Halsted Poole, of Marbury, Whitchurch
- 1881: George Dixon, of Astle Hall, Chelford
- 1882: Egerton Leigh, of Jodrell and West Hall, High Legh
- 1883: Arthur Hugh Smith Barry, of Marbury, Northwich
- 1884: Colonel Henry Martin Cornwall Legh, of East Hall, High Legh
- 1885: Colonel Hugh Robert Hibbert, of Birtles Hall, near Chelford
- 1886: Francis Dicken Brocklehurst, of Hare Hill, Macclesfield
- 1887: James Tomkinson, of Willington Hall, Tarporley
- 1888: Baron William Henry von Schröder
- 1889: James Jardine
- 1890: George Barbour
- 1891: Christopher Kay
- 1892: Thomas Henry Ismay
- 1893: Robert Charles de Grey Viner
- 1894: Frederic James Harrison
- 1895: Hugh Lyle Smyth
- 1896: Ralph Brocklebank
- 1897: William Henry Verdin
- 1898: Richard Hobson
- 1899: Thomas Hardcastle Sykes

=== 1900–1973 ===
- 1900: Benjamin Chaffers Roberts, of Oakfield, Chester
- 1901: Thomas Brocklebank
- 1902: John Sutherland Harmood Banner
- 1903: Thomas Bland Royden
- 1904: George Littleton Dewhurst
- 1905: Arthur Hornby Lewis
- 1906: William Watson
- 1907: Sir Gilbert Greenall, 2nd Baronet
- 1908: Sir William Pollitt
- 1909: Herbert Wheeler Hind
- 1910: Francis Aylmer Frost
- 1911: John Brooks Close-Brooks
- 1912: Joseph Battersby Duckworth
- 1913: Alfred Watkin
- 1914: Robert Walter Douglas Phillips Brocklehurst
- 1915: Frederick Hynde Fox
- 1916: Frederick William Wignall
- 1917: Thomas Royden of Frankby Hall, Frankby
- 1918: James Edgar Dennis
- 1919: Sir Kenneth Irwin Crossley
- 1920: Sir Percy Elly Bates
- 1921: Captain Cuthbert Leicester-Warren
- 1922: John Graham Peel
- 1923: William Lever, 2nd Viscount Leverhulme
- 1924: Lieutenant-Colonel Charles Lyon
- 1925: Major Robert Barbour
- 1926: Sir John Herbert Vernon
- 1927: Major Charles William Tomkinson
- 1928: Major Philip Durning Holt
- 1929: Captain William Hosken France-Hayhurst
- 1930: Frank Brocklehurst
- 1931: Edward Peter Jones
- 1932: William Gavin Clegg
- 1933: Lieutenant-Colonel Richard Norman Harrison Verdin
- 1934: Major Arthur Harold Bibby
- 1935: Sir William Rylands, 1st Baronet
- 1936: Robert Henry Grenville Tatton
- 1937: Sir Robert Noton Barclay
- 1938: Major Walter Wynnefield Higgin
- 1939: Charles Legh Shuldham Cornwall-Legh
- 1940: Sir Robert Abraham Burrows
- 1941: Sir Philip Grey-Egerton
- 1942: Edward Howard Brocklehurst
- 1943: Duncan Thomas Norman
- 1944: Brevet Colonel James Geoffrey Bryden Beazley
- 1945: Colonel Harry Johnson
- 1946: Major Hugh Kelsall Frost
- 1947: Colonel Benjamin William Heaton
- 1948: Edgar Rennie Bowring
- 1949: Brevet-Colonel George Bentham Leathart Rae
- 1950: Thomas Humphrey Naylor, of The Grange
- 1951: Humphrey Bagnall Vernon, of Forest Lodge, Bracknell
- 1952: Captain Oscar Dunstan Winterbottom, of Tilston House
- 1953: Sir Randle Baker Wilbraham, of Rode Hall
- 1954: Colonel Laurence Millington Synge of the Old Rectory
- 1955: Hugh Rupert Granger, of Littleton Hall
- 1956: Alexander Ludovic Grant, of Marbury Hall
- 1957: Lieutenant-Colonel Charles Douglas Fergusson Phillips Brocklehurst, of Hare Hill
- 1958: Major Vere Arbuthnot Arnold, of Ardmore
- 1959: Gerald Grosvenor, 4th Duke of Westminster, of Saighton Grange
- 1960: Lieutenant-Colonel Ronald Henry Antrobus
- 1961: Lieutenant-Colonel David Mayhew Bateson
- 1962: Lieutenant-Colonel Frank Leslie Orme
- 1963: Major John Neville Davies-Colley
- 1964: Colonel Geoffrey Vardon Churton
- 1965: Lieutenant-Colonel John Leighton Byrne Leycester-Warren
- 1966: Brevet-Colonel Ronald Prinsep Langford-Brooke of Mere Old Hall
- 1967: Richard Jeffery Lockett
- 1968: Francis Moore Dutton
- 1969: Colonel Sir William Loris Mather
- 1970: Lieutenant-Colonel Geoffrey Ernald Sparrow
- 1971: Joseph Charlton Taylor
- 1972: Lieutenant-Colonel Alexander James Watkin Grubb
- 1973: Sir George Henry Kenyon

== List of High Sheriffs of Cheshire ==
=== 1974–1999 ===
- 1974: Lieutenant-Colonel John Aylmer Christie-Miller
- 1975: Lieutenant-Colonel James Malcolm Harrison
- 1976: Cecil Charlton Taylor
- 1977: Anthony Kirk Wolley Dod, of Edge
- 1978: Ewart Agnew Boddington
- 1979: Sir John Kemp Barlow
- 1980: John Meredith Temple, of Picton Gorse
- 1981: Commander Richard Tan Gilchrist
- 1982: Robert John Posnett
- 1983: Sir William Bromley-Davenport, of The Kennels
- 1984: Richard Charles Roundell
- 1985: Robert Donald Wilson
- 1986: Peter James Brocklehurst
- 1987: Anthony George Barbour
- 1988: Sebastian Basil Joseph Ziani de Ferranti
- 1989: Jeffrey Bannerman Lockett
- 1990: David Maurice Stern
- 1991: Sir Richard Baker-Wilbraham Bt
- 1992: Peter Greenall, 4th Baron Daresbury (now Lord Daresbury)
- 1993: Richard Henry Cornwall-Legh (now Lord Grey of Codnor)
- 1994: Robert James McAlpine
- 1995: John Michael Pickering
- 1996: Sir Antony Richard Pilkington
- 1997: Edward Simon Tudor-Evans
- 1998: Michael Anthony Tudor Trevor-Barnston
- 1999: Miles David Astley Clarke

=== 2000–present ===
- 2000: Simon Chantler
- 2001: Anthony William Assheton Spiegelberg
- 2002: John Anthony Edward Relf Richards
- 2003: Diana Mary McConnell
- 2004: Simon Patrick Sherrard
- 2005: Carolin Mary Paton-Smith
- 2006: David Briggs
- 2007: Nicholas Walter Bromley-Davenport
- 2008: Alastair Maxwell Stoddard of Tarporley
- 2009: William Gordon Fergusson
- 2010: Diana Caroline Barbour of Bolesworth Castle
- 2011: John Lea of Crewe
- 2012: William Lees-Jones of Oakmere
- 2013: Martin Beaumont of Tarporley
- 2014: Susan Sellers of Park House, Rushton, nr Tarporley
- 2015: Charles William Holroyd of Abbots Moss Hall, Oakmere
- 2016: Kathrine Helen Cowell of Wilmslow
- 2017: Sarah Alexandra Mary Callander Beckett of Combermere, Whitchurch
- 2018: Alexis Jane Redmond of Willington
- 2019: Mark Steven Mitchell of Willaston
- 2020: Nicholas Peter Hopkinson of Great Budworth, Northwich
- 2021: Robert James Mee of Mollington, Chester
- 2022: Jean Gaynor France-Hayhurst of Bunbury Heath
- 2023: Dennis Dunn of Church Lawton
- 2024: Clare Elizabeth Hayward, Macclesfield
- 2025: Joelle Susan Warren, Alsager
- 2026: Lynn Karen Pegler, Northwich

== See also ==
- County Palatine of Cheshire
