= Brooke baronets of Norton (1662) =

Arms of the Brooke baronets of Norton

The Brooke baronetcy of Norton in the County of Chester, was created in the Baronetage of England on 12 December 1662 for Henry Brooke, a Colonel in the Parliamentary Army and Member of Parliament for Cheshire during the Commonwealth. Their seat was Norton Priory until it was vacated in 1921 and demolished in 1928. As of 2026, the title is held by Sir Christopher Brooke, 12th Baronet, who succeeded his father in 2012.

== List of Brooke baronets of Norton ==
- Sir Henry Brooke, 1st Baronet (c. 1611–1664)
- Sir Richard Brooke, 2nd Baronet (c. 1635–1710), High Sheriff of Cheshire in 1667.
- Sir Thomas Brooke, 3rd Baronet (c. 1664–1737), High Sheriff of Cheshire from 1719 to 1720
- Sir Richard Brooke, 4th Baronet (c. 1719–1781), grandson of Thomas Brooke, 3rd Baronet, and High Sheriff of Cheshire from 1752 to 1753
- Sir Richard Brooke, 5th Baronet (c. 1753–1795), High Sheriff of Cheshire from 1787 to 1788
- Sir Richard Brooke, 6th Baronet (1785–1865), High Sheriff of Cheshire from 1817 to 1818
- Sir Richard Brooke, 7th Baronet (1814–1888), High Sheriff of Cheshire between 1869 and 1870
- Sir Richard Marcus Brooke, 8th Baronet (1850–1920)
- Sir Richard Christopher Brooke, 9th Baronet (1888–1981), the last Brooke to occupy Norton Priory before moving to The Elms, Worcestershire, where he became High Sheriff of Worcestershire in 1931, a Deputy Lieutenant of the county and a member of Worcestershire County Council
- Sir Richard Neville Brooke, 10th Baronet (1915–1997)
- Sir (Richard) David Christopher Brooke, 11th Baronet (1938–2012)
- Sir (Richard) Christopher Brooke, 12th Baronet (born 1966), an Old Etonian and owner of Woodford, a hotel chain. He has been a trustee of Norton Priory Museum & Gardens since 2020. He married the journalist Sarah Montague in 2002. He has one daughter from a previous relationship and three daughters with Montague.

The heir presumptive is the present holder's brother Edward Marcus Brooke (born 1970).

== Family and branches ==
The first recorded ancestor of the family is Adam Lord of Leighton in the reign of Henry III. The elder male line became extinct in 1632.

Richard Brooke (died 1569), the youngest son of Thomas Brooke of Leighton and great-grandfather of the 1st Baronet, purchased the Norton Priory estate from Henry VIII in 1545. The Broke baronets of Nacton (1661) and of Broke Hall (1813) were younger branches descended from Richard Brooke and both titles are extinct.

Richard's eldest son, Thomas Brooke of Norton (died 1622), grandfather of the first Baronet, was a parliamentarian and was Sheriff of Cheshire in 1592. His youngest son, Peter Brooke, bought Mere Hall in 1652 and was made a knight bachelor in July 1660, becoming the first Brooke of Mere.

Thomas Brooke (1816–1880), second son of the 6th Baronet, was a General in the British Army. His son, Alured de Vere Brooke (1841–1926), was a colonel in the Royal Engineers.

== Gallery ==
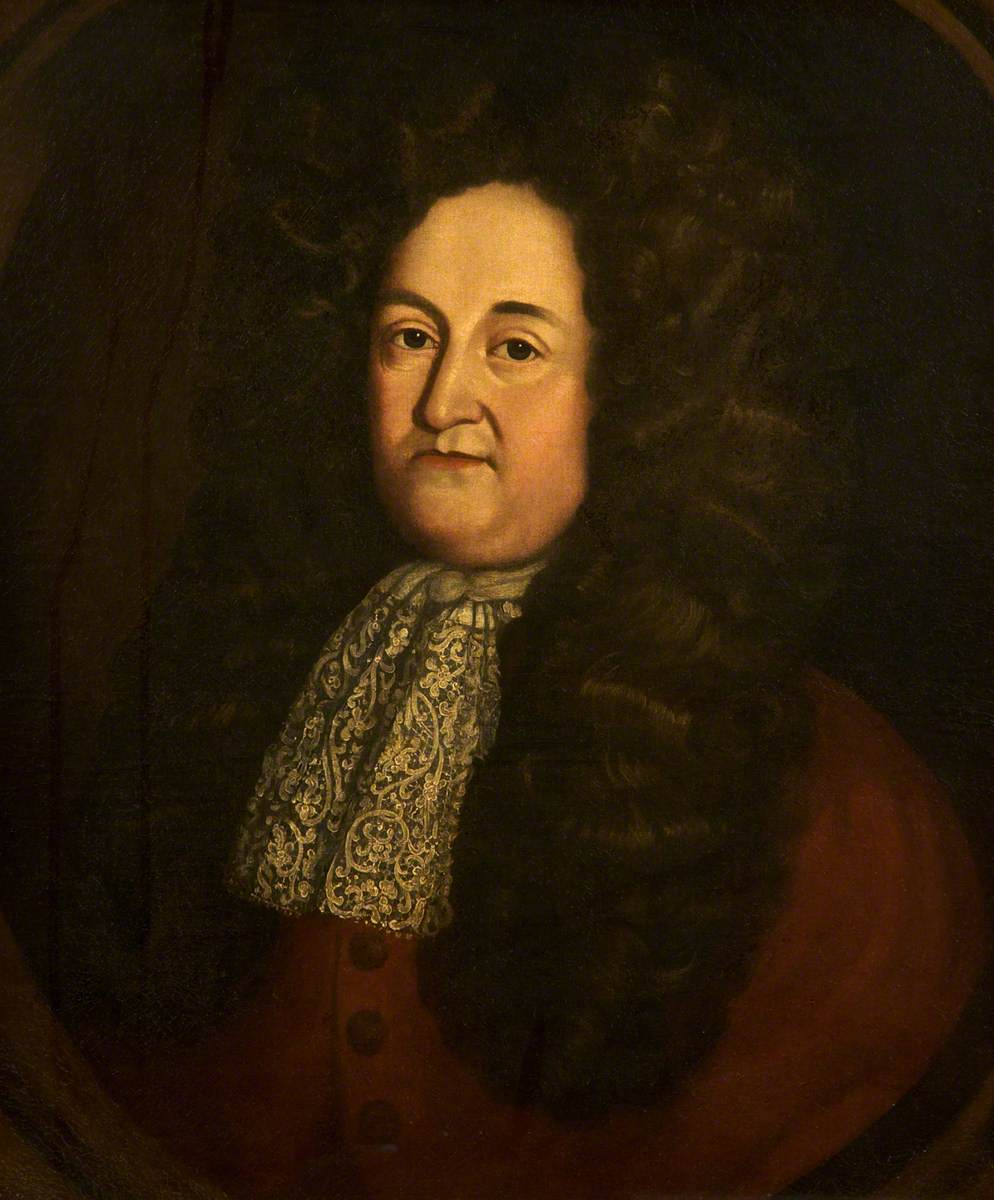
Richard Brooke, 2nd Bt (c. 1635–1710)

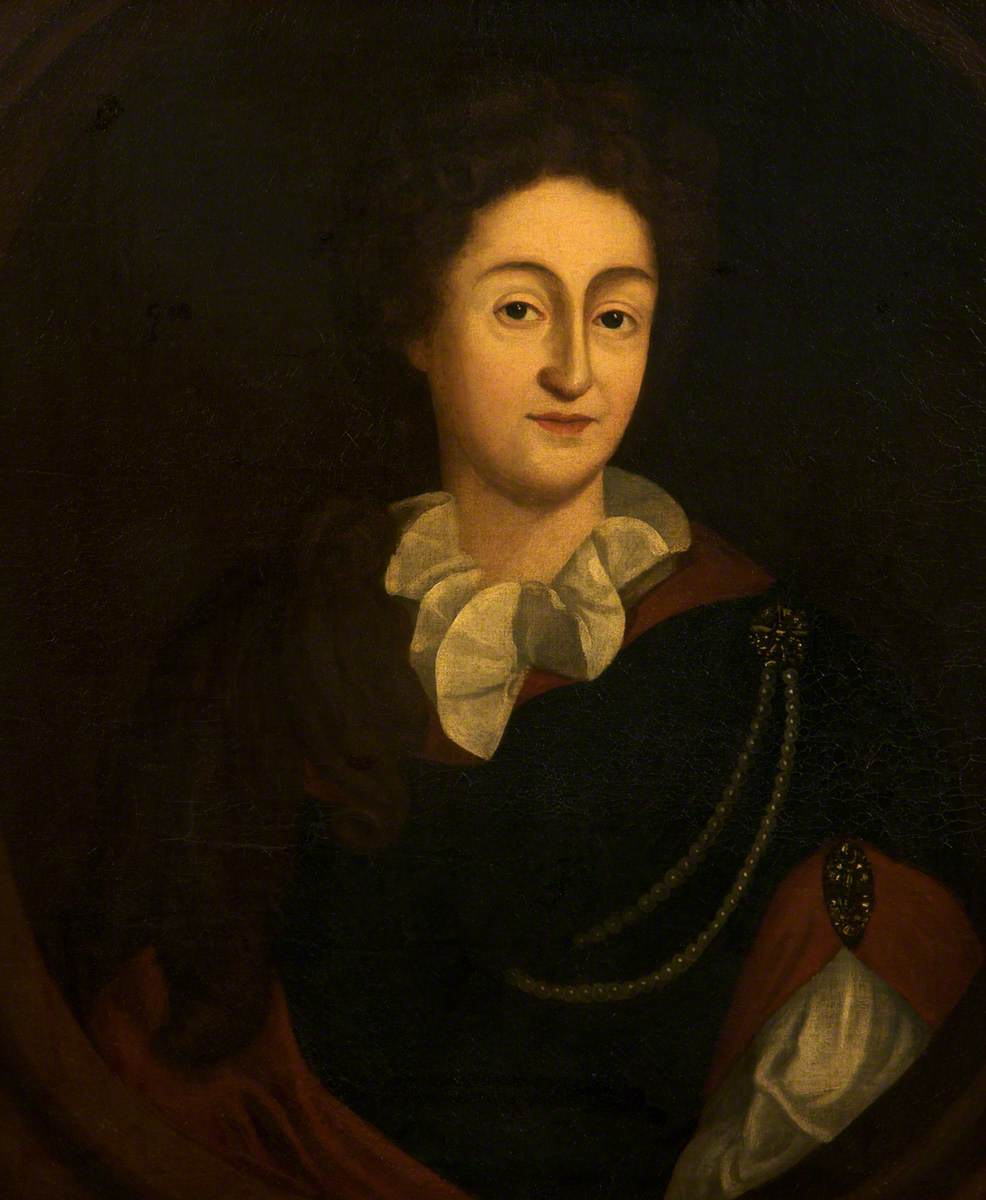
Francisca Posthuma Legh (c. 1639–1696), Lady Richard Brooke

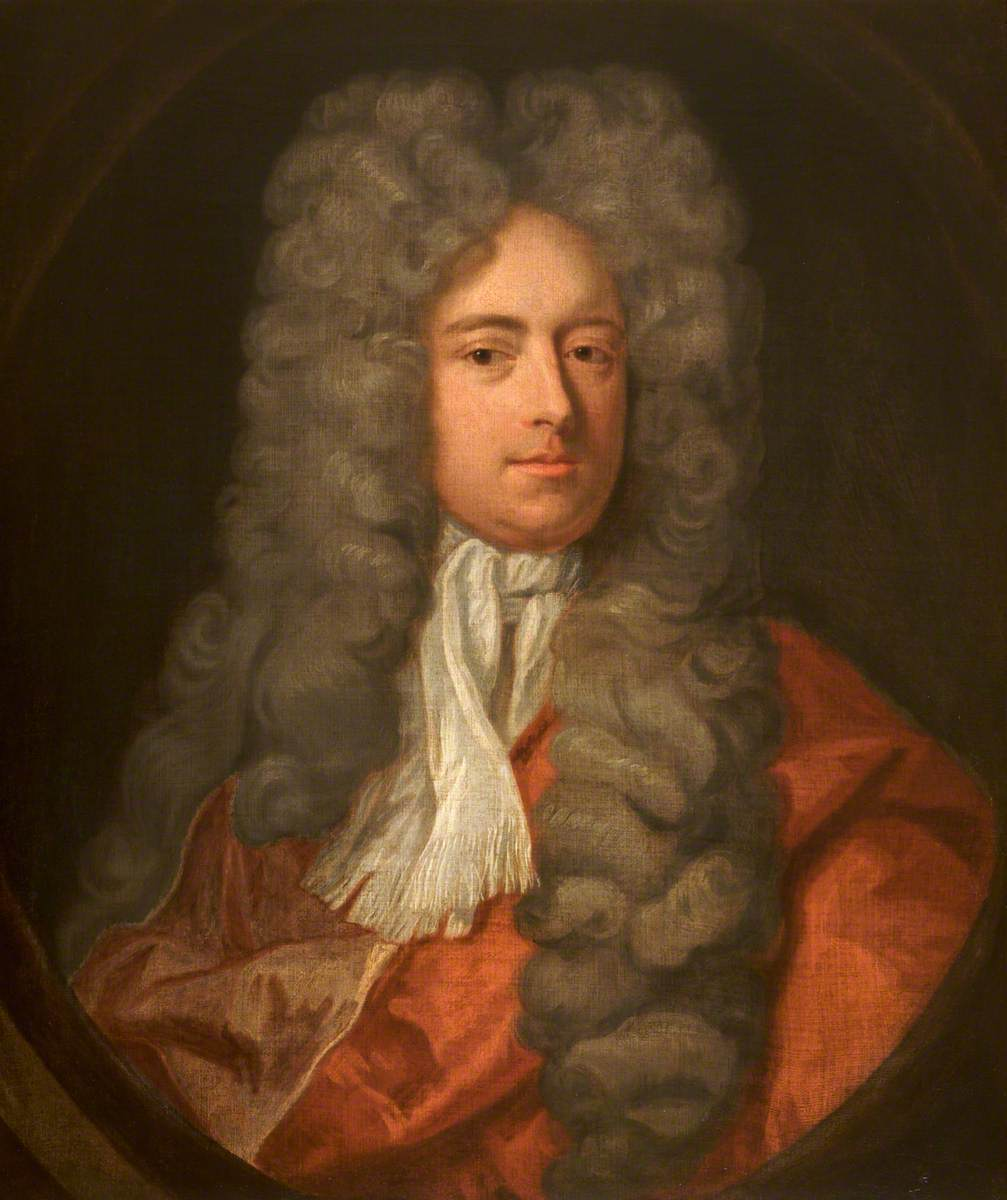
Thomas Brooke, 3rd Bt (c. 1664–1737)

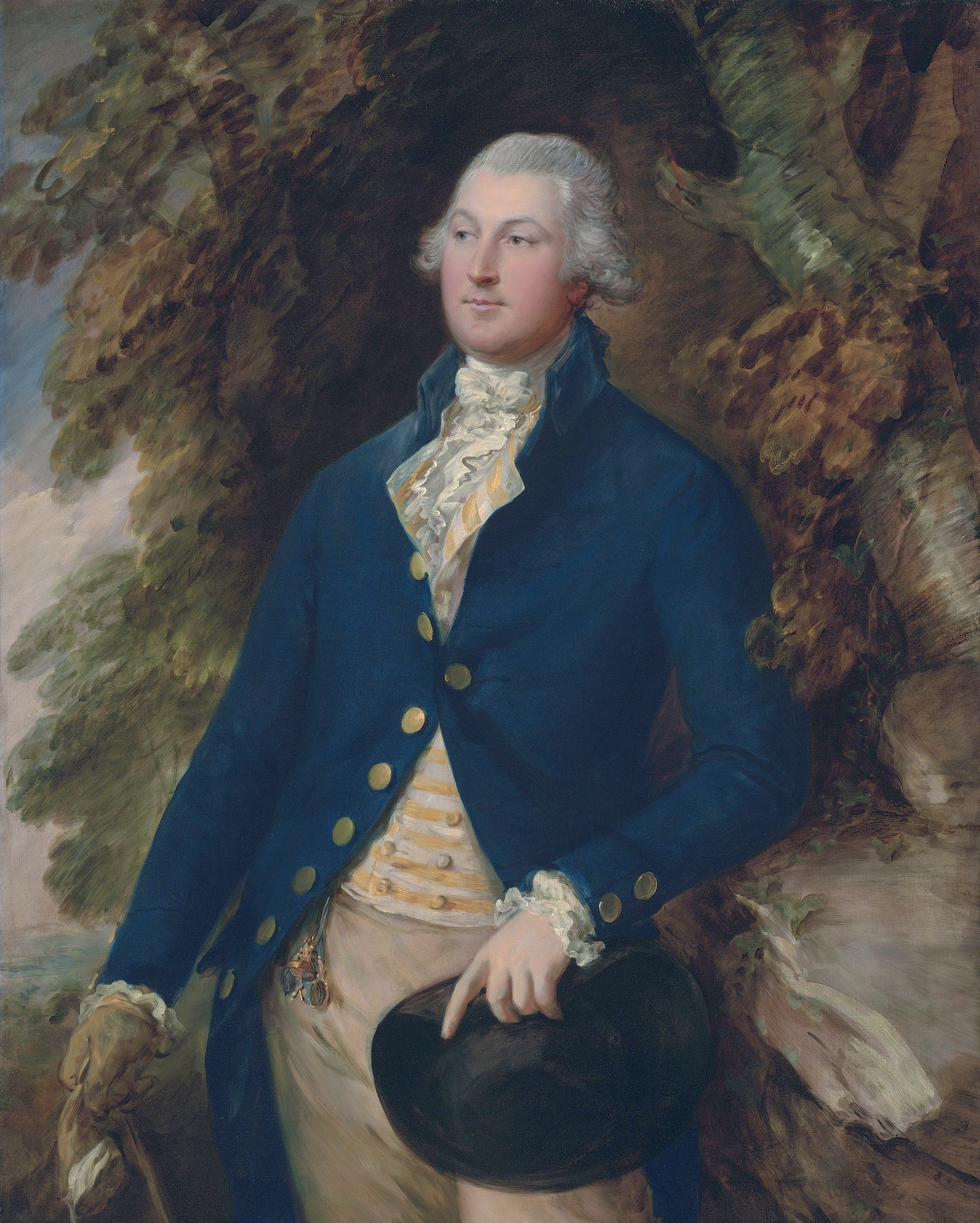
Richard Brooke, 5th Bt (1753–1795), by Thomas Gainsborough

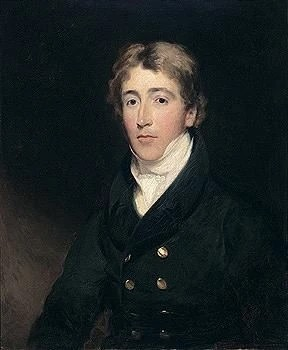
Richard Brooke, 6th Bt (1785–1865), by Martin Archer Shee

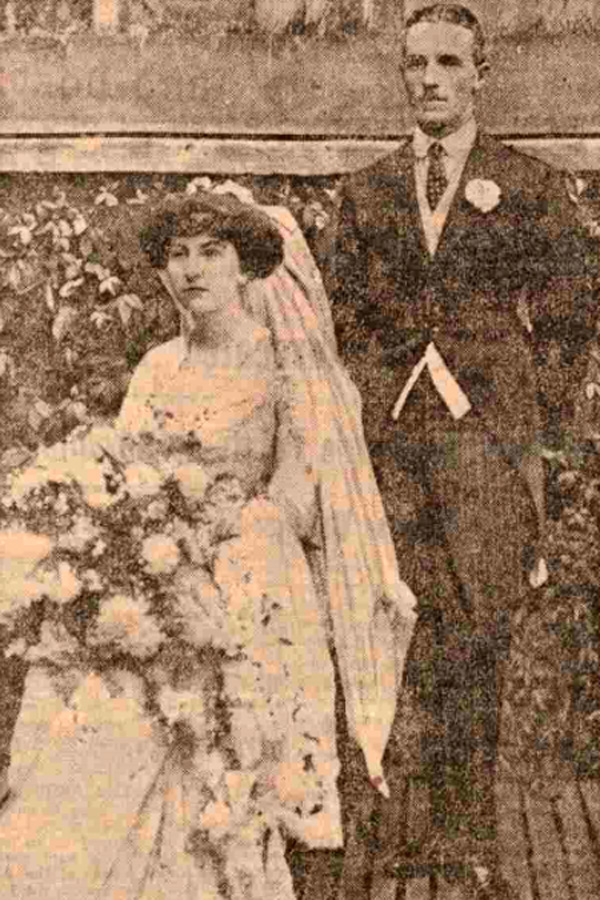
Richard Christopher Brooke, 9th Bt, on his marriage to Marion Brooke, 1912
