= William Clegg =

William Clegg may refer to:

- William Clegg (footballer) (1852–1932), English footballer and politician
- William Clegg (cricketer) (1869–1949), English cricketer
- William Henry Clegg (1867–1945), governor of the South African Reserve Bank

== See also ==
- Bill Clegg, American literary agent and author
