= John Macleod Campbell Crum =

British Anglican priest, author and hymnwriter

- Born: 12 October 1872; Mere, Cheshire
- Died: 19 December 1958 (aged 86); Farnham, Surrey
- Spouse(s): Edith Frideswide Paget (m. 1908; died 1910); Emily Clare Bale (m. 1916; died 1962)
- Children: Margaret Crum and others

The Rev. Canon John Macleod Campbell Crum (12 October 1872 - 19 December 1958) was an Anglican priest, author and hymnwriter.

== Family and education ==
Crum was born at Mere Old Hall near Knutsford, Cheshire, to William Graham Crum, a calico printer, and Jean Campbell, who were both of Scottish origin. The family later lived at Broxton Old Hall, also in Cheshire. His grandfathers were the chemist Walter Crum and the theologian John McLeod Campbell.

He was educated at Eton College and New College, Oxford, where he obtained a BA in 1895 and an MA in 1901.

On 13 October 1908 Crum married Edith Frideswide Paget (1889-1910), daughter of the Rt. Rev. Francis Paget, Bishop of Oxford. They had one son, William Francis Crum (1910-1942), who died at the American Hospital in Constantinople while working for the British Council. On 9 April 1913 Crum married his second wife, Emily Clare Bale (1879-1962); among their children was the writer Margaret Crum.

== Career ==
Crum was ordained a deacon in 1897 and a priest in 1900. He served as curate of St John the Evangelist, Darlington (1897-1901) and was domestic chaplain to the Bishop of Oxford (who became his father-in-law in 1908) from 1901 to 1910. After short spells as curate of Windsor (1907-1910), and vicar of Mentmore with Ledburn (1910-1912), he became rector of Farnham, serving there from 1913 to 1928. He was canon of Canterbury Cathedral from 1928 to 1943.

Crum wrote hymns as well as books on architecture, history and theology. His most famous hymn is Now the Green Blade Riseth, set to the tune of an old French carol.

He died at Farnham, Surrey, on 19 December 1958.
