= St John the Evangelist's Church, Toft =

Coordinates: 53.2864°N 2.3627°W

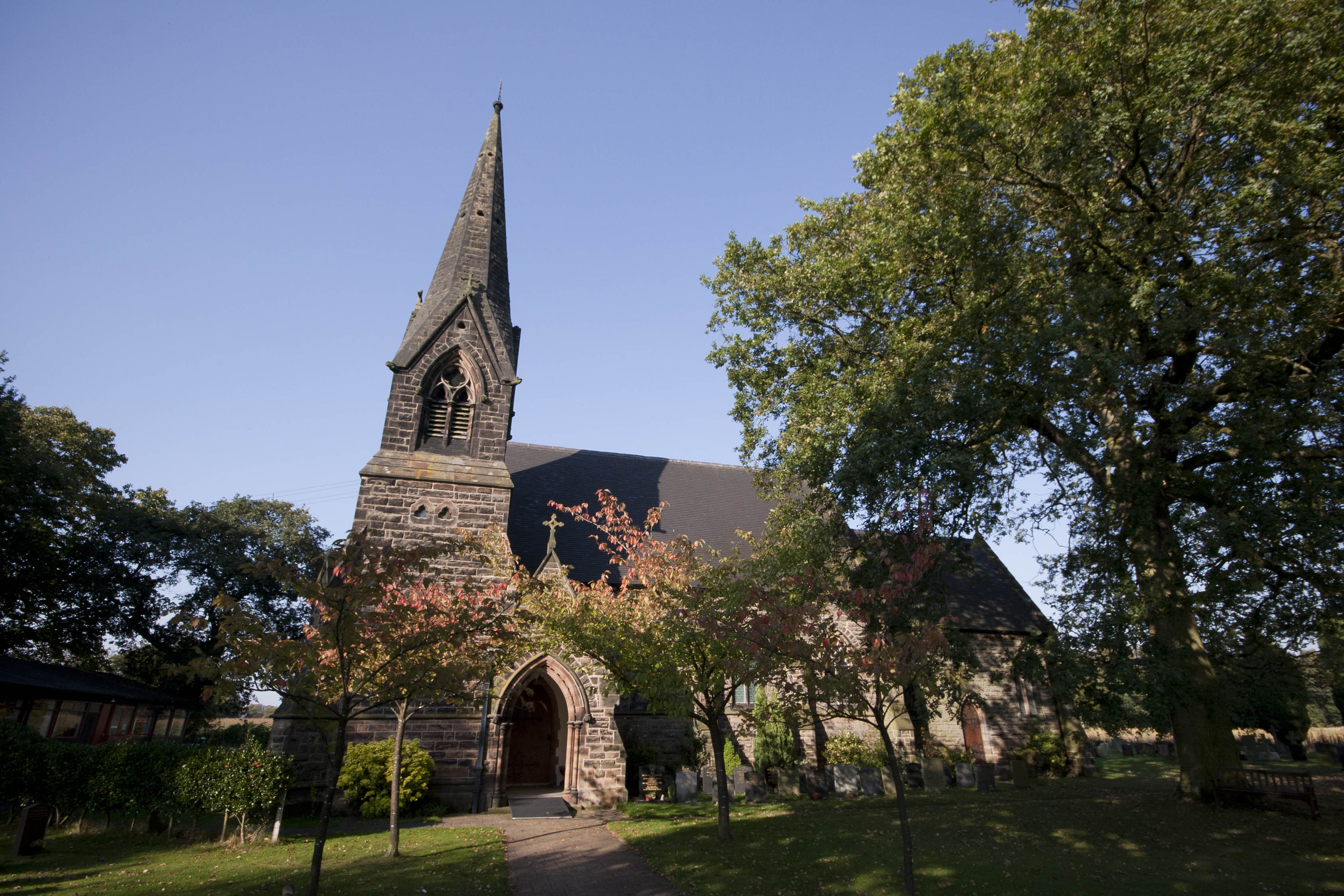
- St John the Evangelist's Church, Toft, from the south

- Location in Cheshire
- OS grid reference: SJ 759 767
- Location: Toft Road, Toft, Cheshire
- Country: England
- Denomination: Anglican
- Website: St John, Toft

History
- Status: Parish church
- Dedication: Saint John the Evangelist
- Consecrated: 1855

Architecture
- Functional status: Active
- Heritage designation: Grade II
- Designated: 28 November 1984
- Architect: William Gilbee Habershon
- Architectural type: Church
- Style: Gothic Revival
- Groundbreaking: 1852
- Completed: 1855

Specifications
- Materials: Stone, tiled roof

Administration
- Province: York
- Diocese: Chester
- Archdeaconry: Macclesfield
- Deanery: Knutsford
- Parish: St John the Evangelist, Toft

Clergy
- Vicar: Revd Nigel Terence Atkinson

St John the Evangelist's Church is in Toft Road, Toft, Cheshire, England. It is an active Anglican parish church in the deanery of Knutsford, the archdeaconry of Macclesfield, and the diocese of Chester. Its benefice is combined with that of St John the Baptist, Knutsford. The church is recorded in the National Heritage List for England as a designated Grade II listed building.

== History ==
The church was built between 1852 and 1855, and designed by William Gilbee Habershon. It was paid for by Mrs Leycester of Toft Hall in memory of her husband. Its chancel was intended for the use of the family, rather than for a choir.

== Architecture ==
St John's is constructed in rubble stone with ashlar dressings, and has a tiled roof. Its plan consists of a five-bay nave with a southwest porch, a north aisle, a chancel with a northeast vestry, and a southwest steeple. Inside the church the arcade between the nave and the aisle is carried on alternate circular and octagonal piers. Mrs Leycester was French, and commissioned the French artist Antoine Lusson to design the stained glass in the east window and in the other windows in the chancel. These are dated 1853, and consist of quatrefoil scenes. To celebrate the 2000 millennium, more stained glass windows were commissioned for the windows in the north aisle. The two manual pipe organ was built in 1888 by C. Whiteley, and repaired in 1929 by Jardine and Company.

== See also ==
- Listed buildings in Toft, Cheshire
