= Shakerley baronets =

Baronetcy in the Baronetage of the United Kingdom

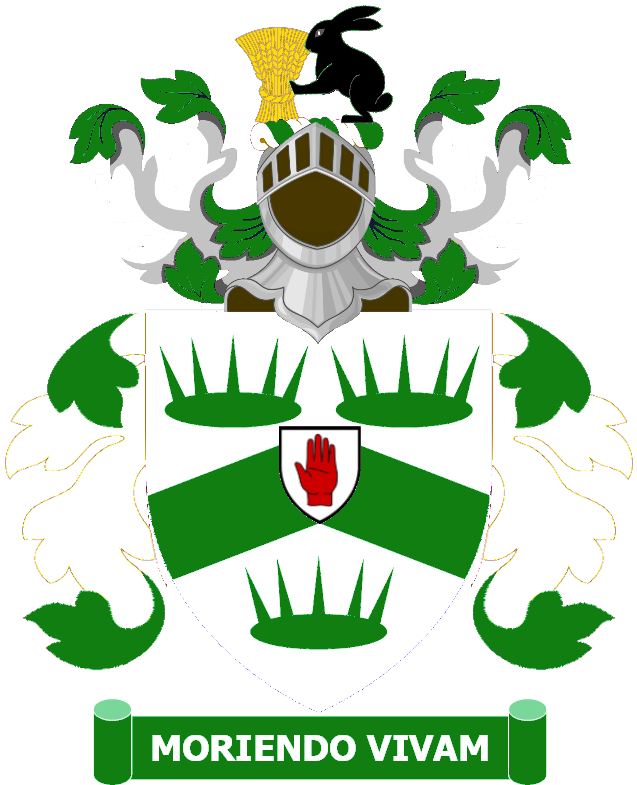
- Crest: A garb Or, on the sinister side a rabbit erect resting its fore-paws thereon Sable.
- Shield: Argent a chevron between three hillocks Vert.
- Motto: Moriendo Vivam (By Dying I Shall Live)

The Shakerley baronetcy, of Somerford Park in the County of Chester, is a title in the Baronetage of the United Kingdom. It was created on 30 July 1838 for Charles Shakerley, High Sheriff of Cheshire in 1837.

== Shakerley baronets, of Somerford Park (1838) ==
- Sir Charles Peter Shakerley, 1st Baronet (1792–1857)
- Sir Charles Watkin Shakerley, 2nd Baronet, Knight Commander of the Order of the Bath (KCB) (1833–1898)
- Sir Walter Geoffrey Shakerley, 3rd Baronet (1859–1943)
- Sir George Herbert Shakerley, 4th Baronet (1863–1945)
- Sir Cyril Holland Shakerley, 5th Baronet (1897–1970)
- Sir Geoffrey Adam Shakerley, 6th Baronet (1932–2012)
- Sir Nicholas Simon Adam Shakerley, 7th Baronet (born 1963)

The heir presumptive is the present holder's brother Peter Jonathan Shakerley (born 1966).

== See also ==
- Hulme Hall, Allostock

== Notes ==
Baronetage of the United Kingdom
Preceded by Dunlop baronets	Shakerley baronets of Somerford Park; 30 July 1838	Succeeded by Seale baronets
