= Mere New Hall =

Coordinates: 53.33222°N 2.40704°W

Mere New Hall stood to the east of the village of Mere and the junction of the A566 and A50 roads in Cheshire, England. It was largely destroyed by fire in 1975.

It was built in 1834 for Peter Langford Brooke to replace Mere Old Hall, the architect being Thomas Johnson of Lichfield. It was a large symmetrical house in Elizabethan style, constructed in brick and decorated with diapering. Its features included a porte-cochère, turrets, and shaped gables. However the house proved to be too large for the family and they returned to the Old Hall in 1914, letting the New Hall initially to George Smith Ollerenshaw and his wife Hannah who opened it to Belgian officers wounded in World War One. Eventually it was sold and became a country club in 1938. In 1975 most of the building was destroyed by fire, although a fragment of it remains, together with a modern extension. As of 2011 it is a golf resort and a spa.

Two structures associated with the house are recorded in the National Heritage List for England as designated Grade II listed buildings. These are the stable block, and the entrance arch and gates.

== See also ==
- Listed buildings in Mere, Cheshire
- Mere Old Hall
