= Norton Water Tower =

Grade II listed building in the United kingdom

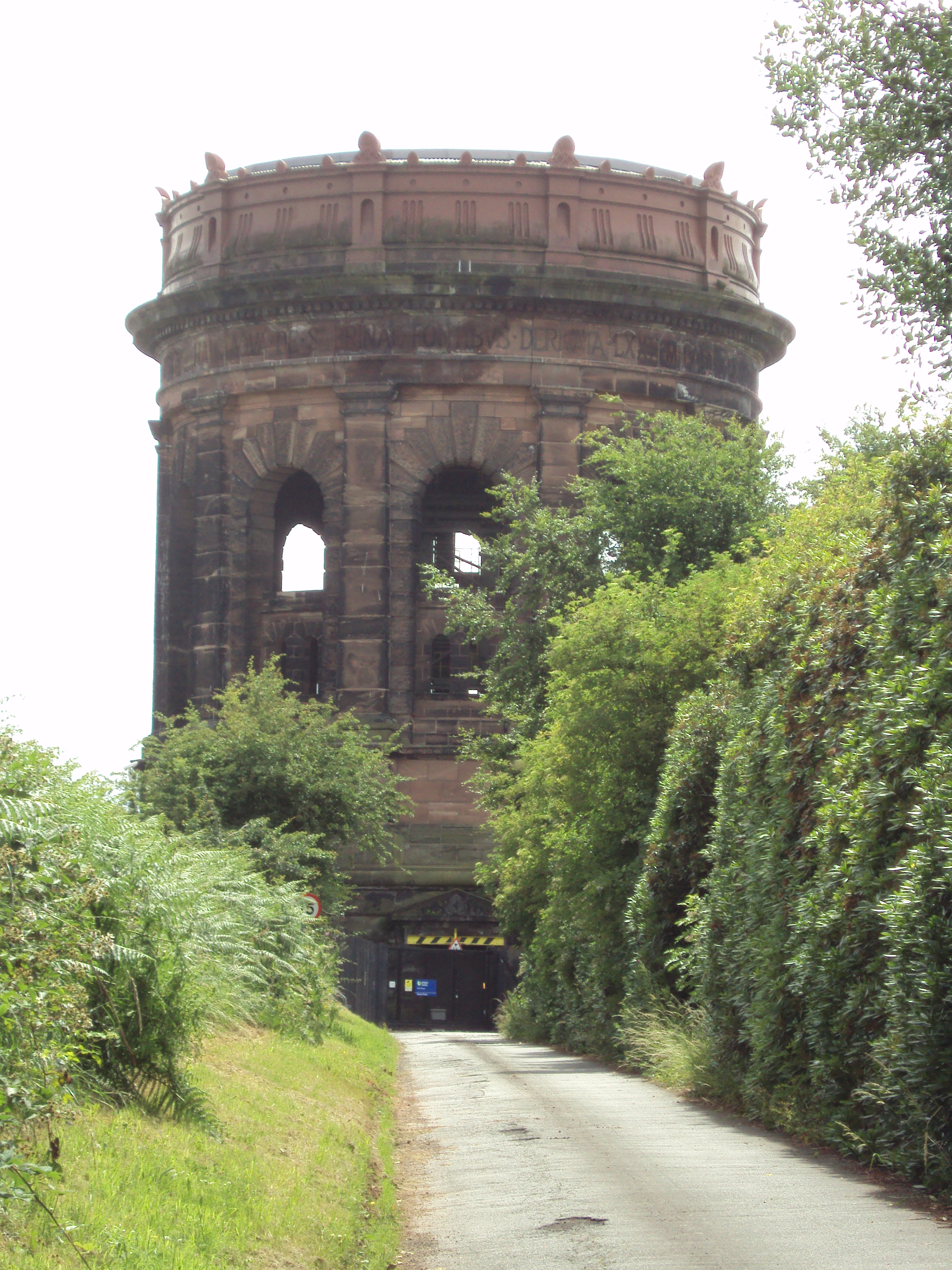
- Norton Water Tower

- Location in Cheshire
- 53.3295°N 2.6714°W
- Location: Norton, Runcorn, Cheshire, England
- OS grid reference: SJ 553 816

History
- Built: 1892; 134 years ago

Listed Building – Grade II
- Designated: 31 October 1983
- Reference no.: 1335884

Norton Water Tower is a water tower in Norton, Runcorn, Cheshire, England. It is recorded in the National Heritage List for England as a designated Grade II listed building.

== History ==
It was built between 1888 and 1892 on the water pipeline between Lake Vyrnwy in North Wales and Liverpool to act as a balancing reservoir in the process of supplying water to Runcorn and Liverpool. Water is carried to Liverpool through a tunnel 10 feet (3 m) wide under the River Mersey. The tower was designed by George F. Deacon, the Chief Engineer of the Liverpool Corporation Waterworks Department.

== Description ==
It is built in red sandstone in the shape of a cylinder 99 feet (30 m) high with a diameter of 82 feet (25 m). On its top is a cast iron tank with a capacity of 650,000 gallons. Ten pilasters rise from a rock-faced base and between them are round-headed arches. Above these is a frieze with a Latin inscription and over this is a cornice. On the top is the iron tank with a decorated exterior. Translated, the inscription on the frieze reads:

This water, derived from the sources of the Severn, is brought to the City of Liverpool, a distance of eighty miles, through the mountains and over the plains of Wales and the intervening country, at the cost of the municipality, in the year of Our Lord 1892.

== See also ==
- Listed buildings in Runcorn (urban area)
