= Listed buildings in Toft, Cheshire =

Toft is a civil parish in Cheshire East, England. It contains eight buildings that are recorded in the National Heritage List for England as designated listed buildings. Of these, one is listed at Grade II*, the middle of the three grades, and the others are at Grade II. The major building in the parish is Toft Hall; this, its stable block and a bridge on the approach road are listed. The rest of the parish is rural, and the other listed buildings are houses, a church and a milepost.

== Key ==
Grade	Criteria
II*	Particularly important buildings of more than special interest
II	Buildings of national importance and special interest

== Buildings ==
Name and location	Photograph	Date	Notes	Grade
Heeson Green Farmhouse; 53.27050°N 2.37615°W	—	Mid 16th century	The farmhouse was extended in the 17th century. It is in brick that is partly rendered, and has a slate roof. The house is in two and three storeys. Inside the house are cruck beams.	II
Toft Hall; 53.28272°N 2.37062°W		17th century	It is presumed that an earlier timber-framed country house was encased in brick in the 17th century, and further alterations and additions followed in each of the following centuries. It is built in rendered brick with stone dressings and a slate roof. The house has an E-shaped plan, is in two storeys, and has a 13-bay front. There are two four-storey towers, one near the centre of each front. In the ground floor are French windows, and elsewhere the windows are sashes. Other features include dormers in the roof, and ball finials.	II*
House near Redbroke Hall; 53.27413°N 2.35092°W	—	Mid to late 17th century	Originally a farmhouse, the house is partly timber-framed with whitewashed infill, and partly in brick, and it has a slate roof. The house was extended in the 19th century. The windows are casements, some of which are in gabled dormers.	II
Stable block, Toft Hall; 53.28341°N 2.37126°W	—	Late 18th century	The stable block is built in brick with a slate roof and has an L-shaped plan. In the angle between the wings is an archway, above which is an octagonal clock tower surmounted by a bellcote with a domed roof. The courtyard front is nearly symmetrical and contains openings of various types including oval pitch holes. The windows are sashes.	II
The Lodge; 53.28601°N 2.36432°W	—	Late 18th to early 19th century	Originally two two-storey cottages, later converted into one house, it is built in brick with slate roofs. The older part faces the road; it has a central gabled porch and casements. The second cottage dates from about 1850, and was initially a vicarage. It has one gable facing the road, and two on the right side. The windows are mullioned.	II
Milepost; 53.27566°N 2.35924°W	—	c. 1830	The milepost is in cast iron and consists of a round post with a domed finial. It carries a curved plate inscribed with the distances in miles to Holmes Chapel, Knutsford, Brereton Green, Altrincham, Church Lawton, Manchester, and Newcastle-under-Lyme.	II
Bridge, drive to Toft Hall; 53.28436°N 2.36793°W	—	Mid 19th century	The bridge is built in brick with ashlar facing. It consists of three segmental arches with rusticated quoins and spandrels containing fan motifs. There are curving retaining walls at the ends of the bridge.	II
St John the Evangelist's Church; 53.28632°N 2.36263°W		1852–55	The church was designed by William Gilbee Habershon. It is built in stone and has a tiled roof. The church consists of a nave, a southwest porch, a north aisle, a chancel, a northeast vestry, and a southwest steeple.	II
