= Bucklow Hill =

Village in Cheshire, England

Coordinates: 53°20′43.18″N 2°24′18.86″W

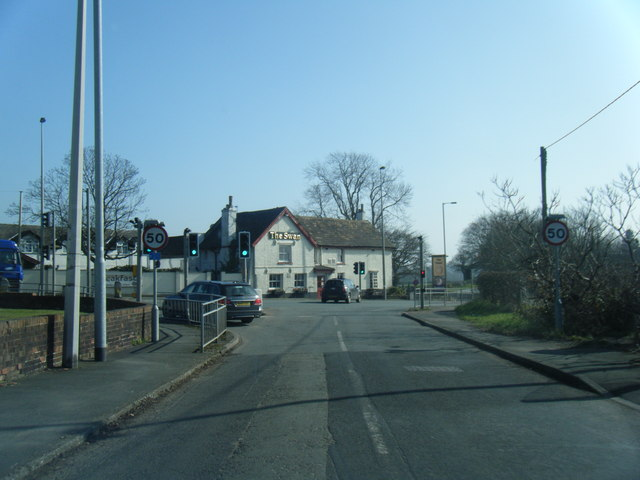
Chapel Lane and Swan Hotel

Bucklow Hill is a village in Cheshire, England whose name originates from a slight rise in the road. It is part of the civil parish of Mere and is located at the junction of the A5034 and the B5569 road (formerly A556).

== History ==
The Bucklow Hundred of Cheshire derives its name from this place. Soldiers were mustered here in 1549 to reinforce the English troops in Scotland during the Rough Wooing. A nonconformist chapel was founded at Bucklow Hill in the 19th century.
