= Sarah Montague =

British BBC radio journalist

Sarah Montague Lady Brooke
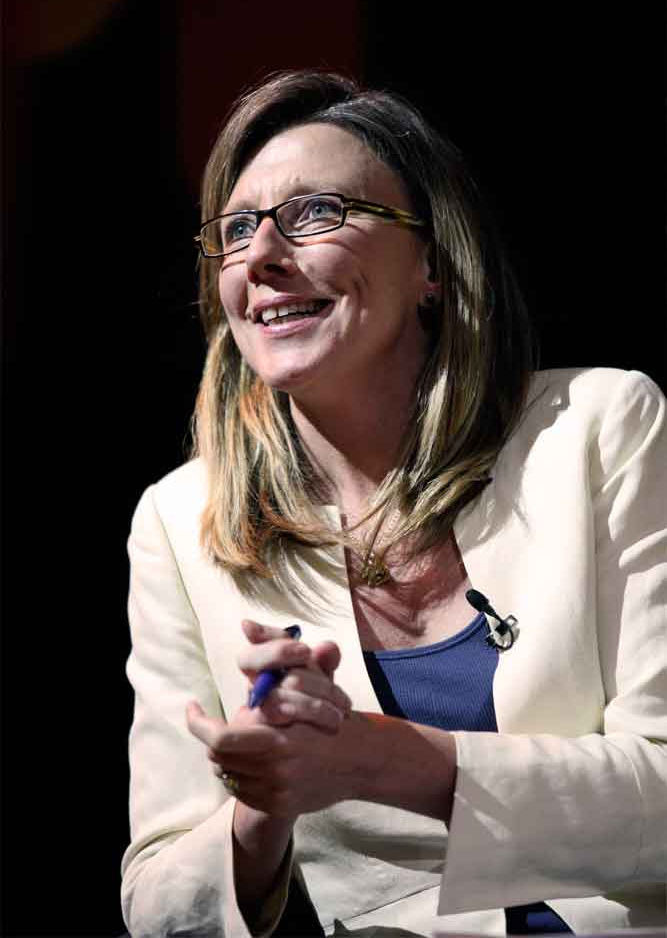
- As conference chair at the NHS Confederation annual conference (2011)
- Born: 8 February 1966 (age 60); Guernsey, Channel Islands
- Education: University of Bristol
- Occupations: Stockbroker (former); Journalist; Radio & television presenter
- Agent: Noel Gay
- Known for: Today (BBC Radio 4); Newsnight; HARDtalk
- Spouses: Sir Christopher Brooke, 12th Baronet (m. 2002)
- Website: BBC webpage

Sarah Anne Louise Montague, Lady Brooke (born 8 February 1966), is a British journalist and presenter of the BBC Radio 4 current affairs programme World at One. For 18 years, prior to April 2018, she was a regular presenter of another radio programme, Today.

== Early life ==
Montague was born to John Montague, a Colonel in the British Army, and Mary (née O'Malley) on Guernsey, a British Crown dependency and one of the Channel Islands. After attending Blanchelande College, a local independent school for girls, she read Biology at the University of Bristol, gaining a BSc.

== Career ==
Montague's first occupation was as a stockbroker for County NatWest and then a Eurobond dealer with NatWest Capital Markets in London. She then went to work with friend Nick Wheeler the owner of men's clothing retailer Charles Tyrwhitt in London, who specialise in mail order men's shirts. Wheeler sacked Montague but the two have remained friends.

Montague commenced her journalistic career with Channel Television in 1991, on short term two-week contracts. She moved back to London as a Freelancer joining Reuters in January 1995 and subsequently became business correspondent for Sky News in January 1996.

She joined the BBC during October 1997, becoming the first voice on BBC News 24, the BBC's first rolling news channel on 9 November 1997. She also presented Newsnight, Breakfast and BBC News, before joining the Today news programme on BBC Radio 4 in 2002. She has also presented HARDtalk on BBC News. In December 2008, she hosted BBC World's Nobel Minds in the library of the Royal Palace, Stockholm. The 2008 Nobel Prize winners in Physics, Chemistry, Medicine, Economics, and Literature had a round-table discussion on issues of global concern and their own contributions to the world of knowledge.

On 6 November 2010, Montague broke a strike at the BBC called by the National Union of Journalists (NUJ). She and fellow presenter Evan Davis arrived at 3:30 am to present the Today programme, early enough to avoid crossing the picket line. On 15 July 2011, she again broke an NUJ strike by presenting Today with Justin Webb.

In 2013 she was awarded the honorary degree Doctor of Letters by the University of Sussex and in 2015 she was awarded the honorary degree Doctor of Laws from the University of Bristol.

After 18 years, she left Radio 4's flagship current affairs programme in April 2018 to take over the lead on the lunchtime news broadcast World at One from Martha Kearney. She was earning much less than her male colleagues, with John Humphrys earning more than four times her salary. She described herself as "incandescent with rage" when she found out she was earning less than other presenters. In January 2020 Montague revealed that she had received a £400,000 settlement and an apology from the BBC for her unequal treatment.

In 2018, she was criticised for misattributing the Electoral Commission's findings that the Vote Leave campaign broke the law in the 2016 referendum, thereby protecting several government ministers from pressure to resign. She repeatedly referred to "these allegations", when they were, in fact, the findings of the statutory body charged with protecting the 2016 referendum and the integrity of UK elections. The Electoral Commission finding and £20,000 fine against BeLeave and Darren Grimes were overruled in court in July 2019. The defendant in the court case said "This raises serious questions about its [The Electoral Commission's] conduct both during and after the referendum." The Guardian reported that "Vote Leave was fined £61,000, in part for refusing to cooperate with investigators".

Montague appeared as a guest on the BBC Newscast (podcast) on 10 October 2025, to discuss the historic Israel-Gaza ceasefire agreement brokered by US president, Donald Trump.

On 8 May 2025 for the 80th anniversary of VE Day, she reported from Guernsey for World at One on the effects of the German occupation on the islanders, and how her own Jewish grandfather fled to England just before the Nazi troops arrived.

== Personal life ==
In April 2002 Montague married businessman Richard Christopher Brooke at Chelsea Register Office. The couple had met while Brooke was setting up a hotel in Holkham, Norfolk. In 2012 her husband inherited the Brooke baronetcy of Norton, becoming Sir Christopher Brooke, 12th Baronet and Montague being entitled to use the courtesy title Lady Brooke. The couple live in west London and have three daughters. Montague also has an older stepdaughter from her husband's previous relationship.
