= Listed buildings in Mere, Cheshire =

Mere is a civil parish in Cheshire East, England. It contains nine buildings that are recorded in the National Heritage List for England as designated listed buildings, all of which are at Grade II. This grade is the lowest of the three gradings given to listed buildings and is applied to "buildings of national importance and special interest". The parish is almost entirely rural. The listed buildings include Mere Old Hall and associated structures, structures associated with Mere New Hall, cottages, a farmhouse, a hotel, and an AA telephone booth.

Name and location	Photograph	Date	Notes
Dale Cottage; 53.33643°N 2.38932°W		c. 1626	A timber-framed cottage with whitewashed brick infill. It is in two storeys and has a three-bay front. The windows are casements, and there is a single dormer. The lintel above the door is carved with a fleur-de-lys.
Winterbottom Farmhouse; 53.32590°N 2.43731°W	—	Late 17th century	The farmhouse is timber-framed with brick infill on a stone plinth and has a slate roof. It is in two storeys, with a two-bay front. The farmhouse was extended in the 19th and 20th centuries.
Thatched Cottage; 53.32920°N 2.39751°W	—	1713	The cottage is timber-framed with whitewashed brick infill on a stone plinth and it has a thatched roof. It is in two storeys, and has a two-bay front. The windows are casements, and in the upper storey are dormers.
Mere Old Hall; 53.33059°N 2.41573°W	—	18th century	A country house in Regency style that was remodelled in 1813 by Lewis Wyatt, later extended further, but reduced in size in the late 19th century. It is built in brick and stone, partly whitewashed and partly rendered, and has roofs partly tiled and partly slated. The house is in two and three storeys.
Walls and sheds, Mere Old Hall; 53.32948°N 2.41725°W	—	c. 1800	The wall is in brick with stone flag copings, it is about 4 metres (13.1 ft) high, and surrounds the kitchen garden in the shape of a trapezoid. There are doors on the east, west, and south sides. On the north side of the north wall, which is hollow, is a range of sheds in 1½ storeys, with roofs that are partly slated and partly roofed in asbestos.
Stable block, Mere New Hall; 53.33221°N 2.40715°W	—	c. 1834	The stable block is built in red brick with blue brick diapering and stone dressings. It is in a single storey, and has a courtyard plan. The entrance has a Tudor archway above which is a tower with a clock face. At the top is a lead cupola with a weathervane. Elsewhere there are octagonal turrets with domed caps.
Entrance arch and lodge, Mere New Hall; 53.33121°N 2.41068°W		c. 1840	The archway and lodge are built in brick with stone dressings and have a tiled roof. In the centre is a two-storey gateway with a Tudor arch flanked by pedestrian walkways. On each side is a single-storey lodge with a casement window and a shaped gable. Above the pedestrian walkways are turrets with domed tops. Above the central arch is a casement window and a shaped gable.
Mere Court Hotel; 53.34392°N 2.42947°W	—	1901–03	This originated as a country house called Meadowlands. It was designed by Frank Dunkerley in Arts and Crafts style. The hotel is in two storeys, the lower storey being in brick, and the upper storey in rendered brick. The roofs are tiled, and the windows are casements. The features include bay windows, a bow window, and gables that are partly tile-hung.
AA Box; 53.33190°N 2.41124°W		1956	A telephone booth for The Automobile Association built in timber with a zinc roof. It has a square plan and is about 10 feet (3.0 m) high. The roof is hipped with cross-gables. On the sides are plaques with the AA logo, and another plaque inscribed "Box 372".

== See also ==
- Listed buildings in Aston by Budworth
- Listed buildings in High Legh
- Listed buildings in Knutsford
- Listed buildings in Millington
- Listed buildings in Rostherne
- Listed buildings in Tabley Superior
- Listed buildings in Tatton
