= Margaret Crum =

British scholar of English poetry and music

Margaret Campbell Crum (9 February 1921 – 18 July 1986) was a British scholar of English poetry and music. A librarian at the Bodleian Library at the University of Oxford, she was the winner of the British Academy's Rose Mary Crawshay Prize in 1966.

== Family and education ==
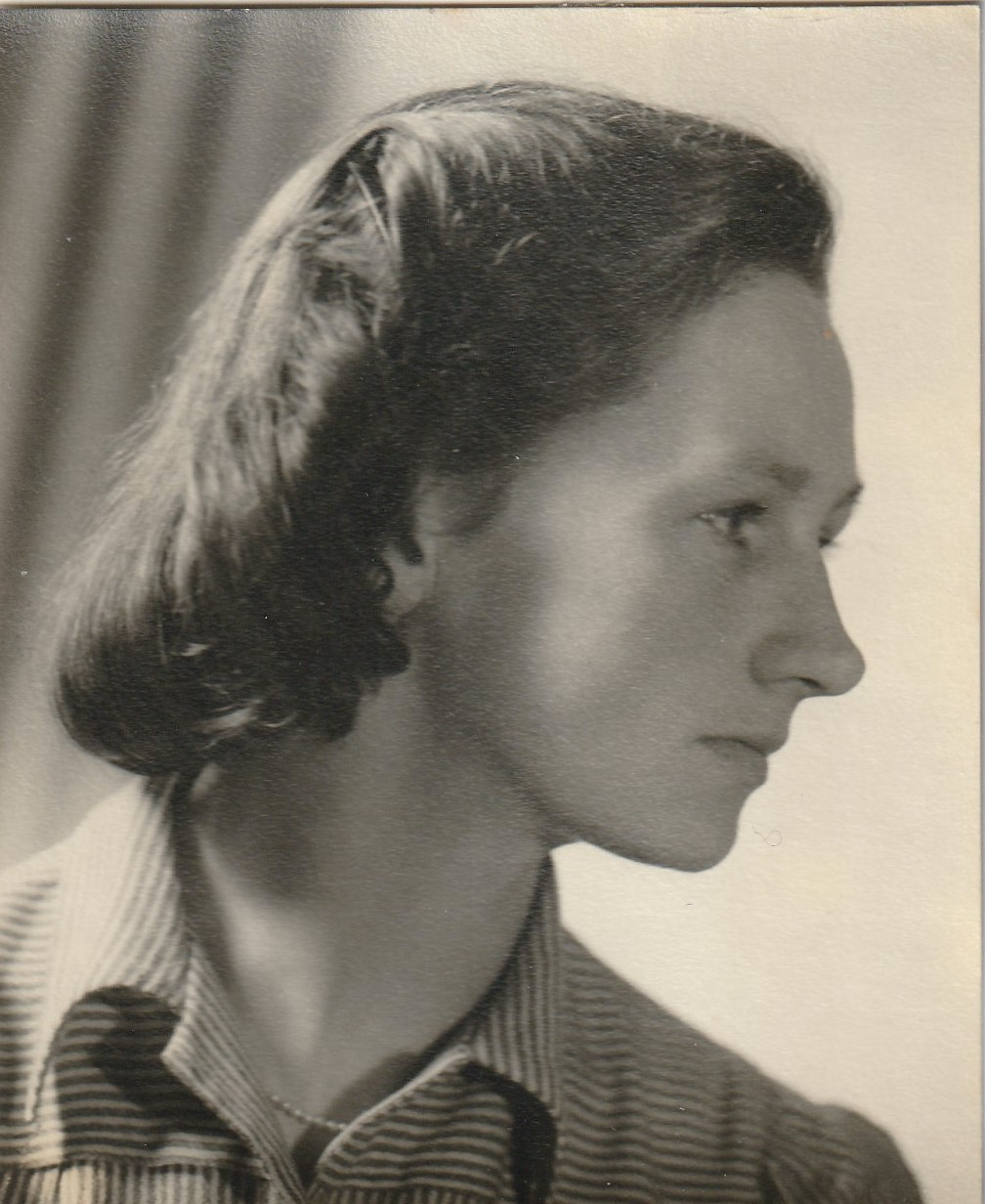
Margaret Crum, librarian at the Bodleian Library in Oxford.

Crum was born in Farnham, Surrey, in 1921. Her father, the Rev. John Macleod Campbell Crum, was rector of Farnham from 1913 to 1928 and later canon of Canterbury Cathedral. Her great-grandfather was the Scottish chemist Walter Crum.

She attended Wycombe Abbey School, graduating in 1939, and then took a First in English from Somerville College, Oxford. She then read for a B.Litt. at Somerville, during which time she also taught and began work on the indexing of English poetry in the manuscript collection of the Bodleian Library.

== Career ==
Crum joined the Bodleian Library as a permanent staff member in 1953. For her edition of The Poems of Henry King (1965), which was her B.Litt. thesis, Crum won the Rose Mary Crawshay Prize in 1966.

She went on to serve as Assistant Librarian at the Bodleian. Between 1953 and 1981, she was a specialist in the Western Manuscripts department, concentrating on literature and music. She was responsible for tracing the provenance of James Sherard's musical collection in the library, publishing a short article and lecturing on the subject at Oxford in 1982.

Crum's magnum opus, First-line index of English poetry, 1500-1800, in manuscripts of the Bodleian Library, Oxford, was published in two large volumes in 1969. She followed this up with learning German, and cataloguing and describing the Bodleian's manuscripts of the composer Felix Mendelssohn, publishing volumes in 1980 and 1983. The latter was considered an indispensable reference work, appreciated for its careful identification of several sketches and previously unfamiliar pieces by the composer.

In 1976, on the 350th anniversary of the establishment of the Heather Professorship of Music at Oxford, Crum organised an exhibition of musical artefacts at the Bodleian.

She died in 1986.

== Selected works ==
- King, Henry (1965). Crum, Margaret (ed.). Poems. Oxford: Clarendon.
- First-line index of English poetry, 1500-1800, in manuscripts of the Bodleian Library, Oxford. Oxford: Clarendon. 1969.
- Felix Mendelssohn-Bartholdy. Oxford: Bodleian Library. 1972.
- Catalogue of the Mendelssohn papers in the Bodleian Library, Oxford. Tützing: Schneider. 1983.
