= Thomas Aston (died 1553) =

Thomas Aston (born on or after 1483, died 1553) of Aston was Sheriff of Cheshire in 1551.

== Biography ==
Aston was the son of Richard Aston (died 1529) of Aston and Dowse, daughter of Piers Warburton of Arley. He was sheriff of Cheshire, 1551 (the 4th year of Edward VI).

== Family ==
In 1512 (4th year of Henry VIII) Aston married Bridget, one of the daughters of John Harewell, and sister and coheir to Thomas Harewell, of Shotery, in Warwickshire. They had children:

- John, son and heir, married Margaret, daughter of Thomas Ireland, of the Hutt, in Lancashire, in 1546.
- Richard, second son.
- Peter, third son, had a bastard called Thomas Aston(born c. 1546), then living at London.
- William, fourth son, married Anne, daughter of Thomas Ireland of the Hutt, Lancashire, and had children.
- Francis, fifth son.

Aston also had a bastard son called Roger (died 23 May 1612), afterwards Sir Roger Aston, Gentleman of the Bedchamber to King James I, who married Mary Stewart, daughter to Alexander, Lord Ochiltree.
