= Pindar baronets =

Extinct baronetcy in the Baronetage of England

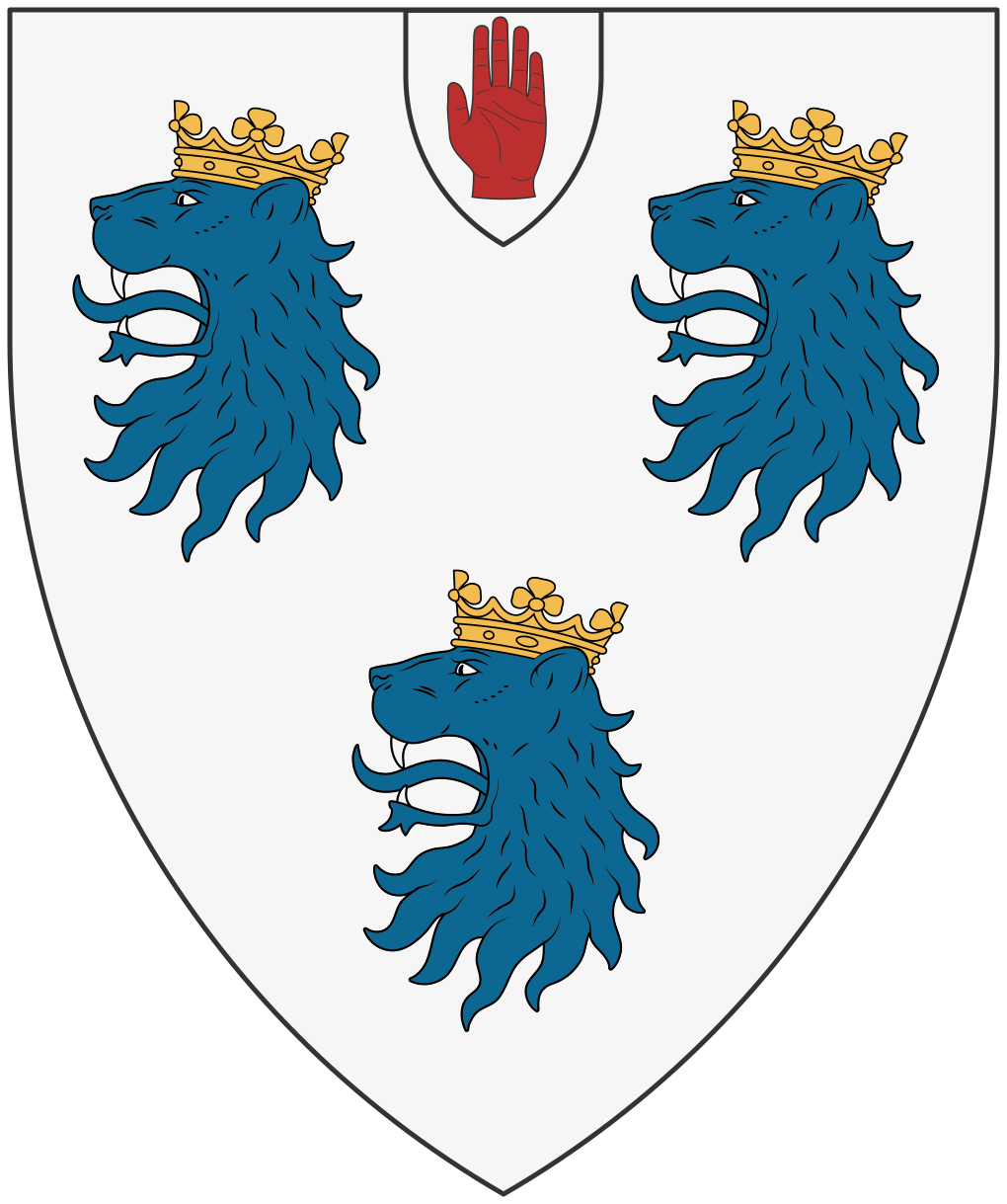
The coat of arms of the Pindar baronets.

The Pindar Baronetcy, of Idinshaw in the County of Chester, was a title in the Baronetage of England. It was created on 22 December 1662 for Peter Pindar. The title became extinct on the death of the third Baronet in circa 1705.

The arms used by the Pindars was disallowed by Sir William Dugdale in the visitation of 1663.

== Pindar baronets, of Idinshaw (1662) ==
- Sir Peter Pindar, 1st Baronet (died c. 1693)
- Sir Thomas Pindar, 2nd Baronet (died c. 1694)
- Sir Paul Pindar, 3rd Baronet (c. 1680–c. 1705)
