= HARDtalk =

British television and radio series

- Presented by: Current: Stephen Sackur; Zeinab Badawi; Sarah Montague; Former: Tim Sebastian (1997–2006)
- Theme music composer: David Lowe
- Country of origin: United Kingdom
- Original language: English

Production
- Production locations: Studio TC7, Television Centre (1997–2012); Studio D, Broadcasting House (2012–2025)
- Editor: Lisa Baxter
- Running time: 25 minutes

Original release
- Network: BBC News (UK feed); BBC News (international feed); BBC World Service
- Release: 31 March 1997 – 28 March 2025

Related
- Hardtalk Extra; Hardtalk Extra Time

HARDtalk is a BBC television and radio programme which was broadcast on the British and international feeds of the BBC News channel, and on the BBC World Service, from 31 March 1997 to 28 March 2025.

Broadcast times and days varied, depending on broadcasting platform and geographic location. HARDtalk was also available on BBC iPlayer in the UK only and as a podcast via BBC Sounds.

On 15 October 2024, the BBC announced that as part of a series of cuts to its news department, HARDtalk would no longer be broadcast, along with the tech review show Click. Host Stephen Sackur said the news was "depressing" [for the future of in-depth interviews that] "hold to account those who all too often avoid accountability in their own countries". The programme aired its final episode on television on 26 March 2025 while its last radio episode was aired two days later on 28 March. The radio version was succeeded by a similar programme titled The Interview.

== Format ==
HARDtalk provided "in-depth interviews with hard-hitting questions and sensitive topics being covered as famous personalities from all walks of life talk about the highs and lows in their lives."

== Presenters and interviewees ==
=== Presenters ===
Tim Sebastian was the original presenter of HARDtalk when the programme launched in March 1997. He hosted the show till March 2007. From 2007 until its cancellation, HARDtalk was predominantly presented by interviewer Stephen Sackur, who joined in 2006. Other presenters included Zeinab Badawi and Sarah Montague.

Final presenters of HARDtalk

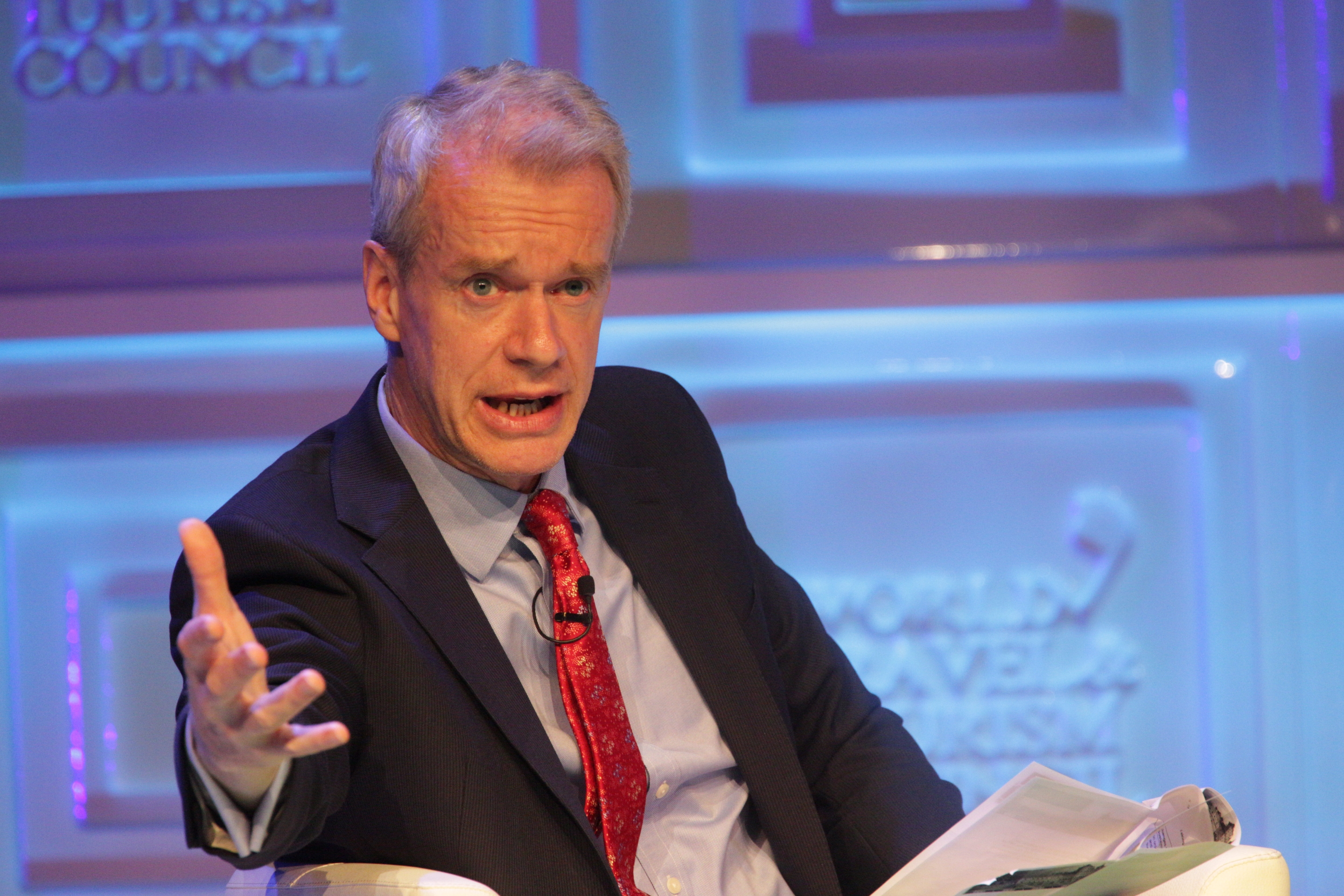
Stephen Sackur

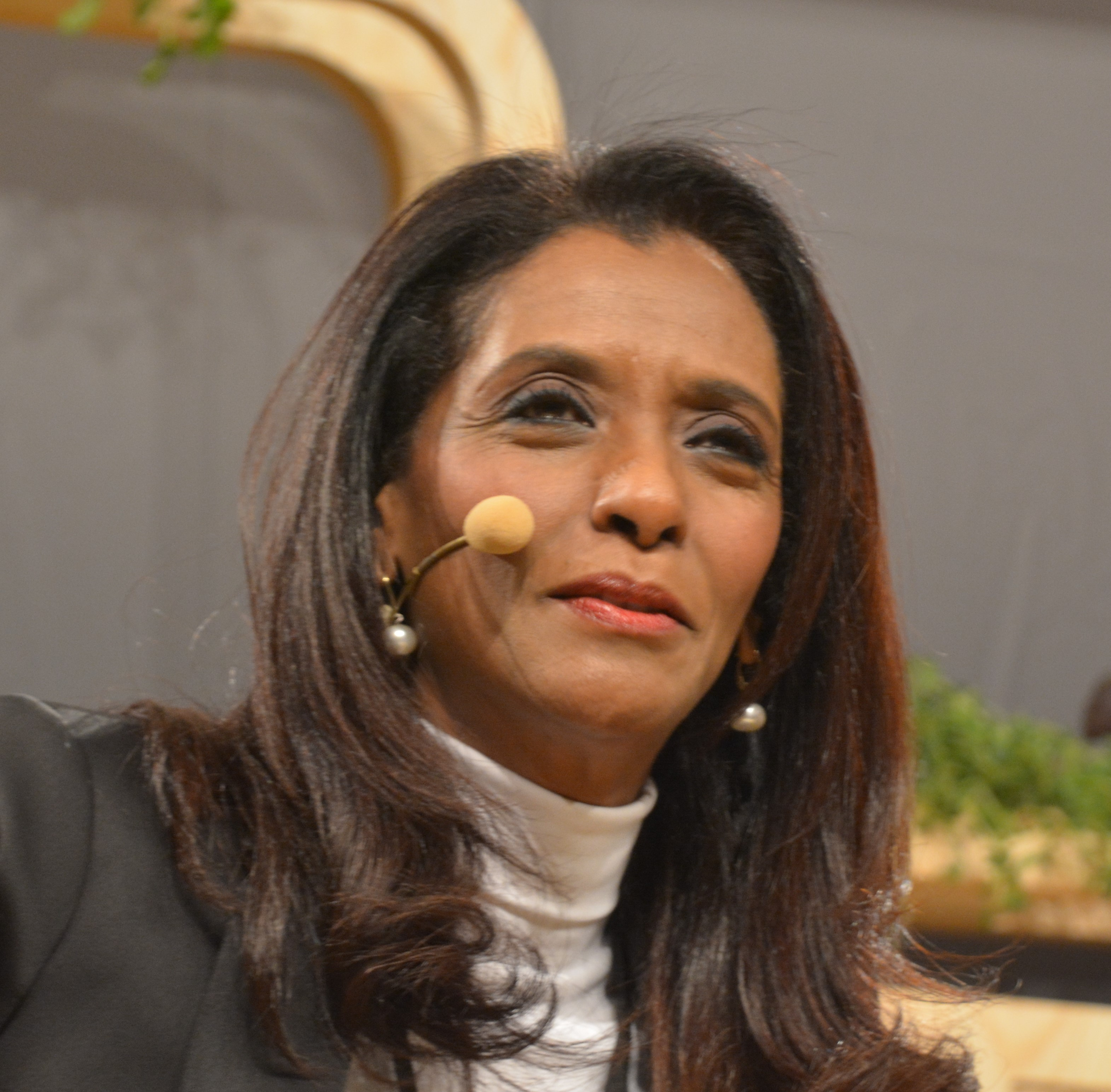
Zeinab Badawi

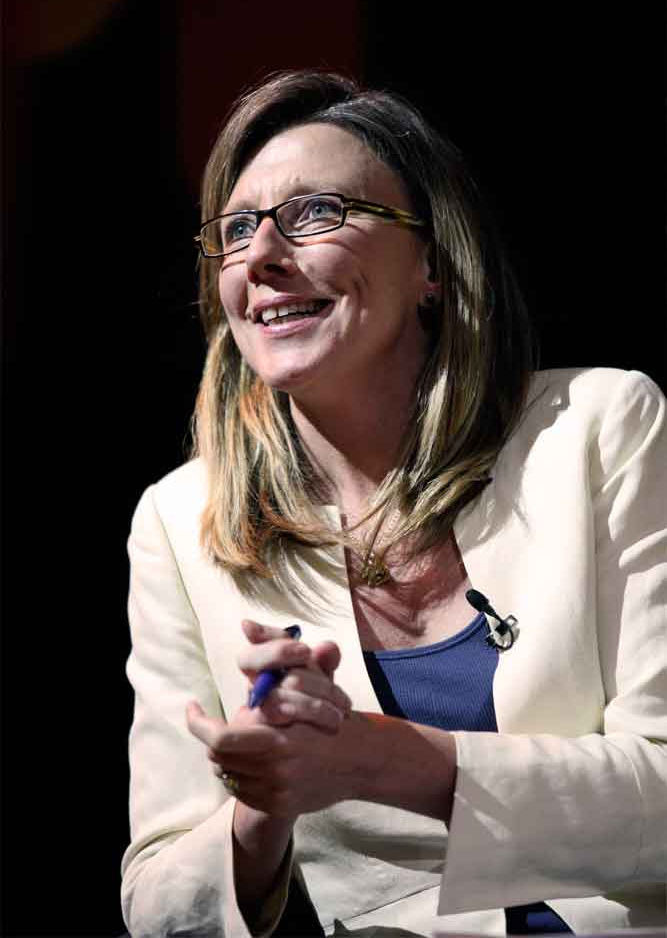
Sarah Montague

=== Selected interviewees ===
HARDtalk has interviewed many public figures of historical significance, including:

- Maya Angelou
- Kofi Annan
- Benazir Bhutto
- Hugo Chávez
- Noam Chomsky
- Michael Collins
- F. W. de Klerk
- Recep Tayyip Erdoğan
- William Frankland
- Mikhail Gorbachev
- Bernice King
- Enrico Letta
- Nelson Mandela
- Mira Marković
- Mahathir Mohamad
- Robert Mugabe
- Nadia Murad
- Olusegun Obasanjo
- Teodoro Obiang
- Michel Platini
- Cyril Ramaphosa
- Thein Sein
- Nina Simone
- Hugh Thompson, Jr
- Desmond Tutu
- Roger Waters

== Spin-offs ==
=== HARDtalk Extra ===
HARDtalk Extra—a series of "interviews with people from the arts and culture," predominantly presented by Gavin Esler.

Interviewees include: Brenda Blethyn, Robin Gibb, Debbie Harry, Marie Helvin, Grayson Perry, Ian Rankin, Kristin Scott Thomas, and Patrick Swayze.

=== HARDtalk Extra Time ===
HARDtalk Extra Time—a spin-off of "in-depth interviews with the athletes, coaches, and power brokers in the world of sport."

Among those interviewed by Rob Bonnet, include: Nicola Adams, Roger Bannister, Jonah Lomu, David Rudisha, and Murray Walker.
