= Sir Henry Brooke, 1st Baronet =

English soldier and politician

Sir Henry Brooke, 1st Baronet (died 1664) was an English soldier and politician.

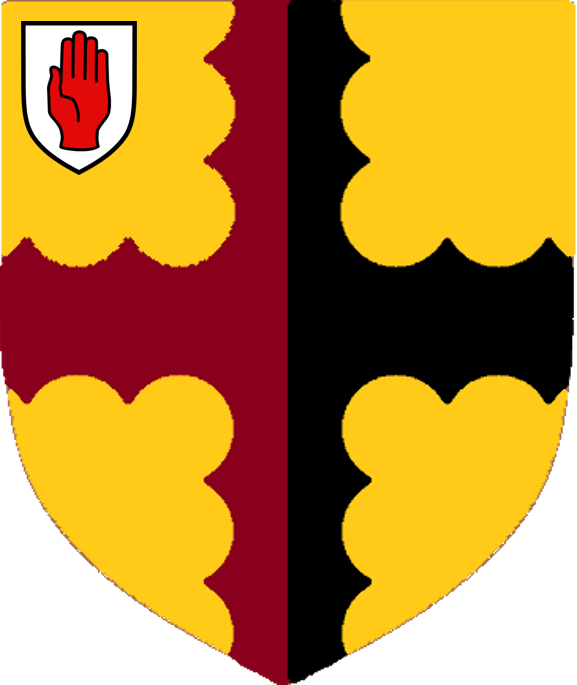
Sir Henry's arms

== Biography ==
Brooke was a great-grandson of Richard Brooke, who purchased Norton Priory from Henry VIII in 1545. His father was Sir Richard Brooke of Norton (died 10 April 1632) and his mother was Catherine Neville (the daughter of Sir Henry Neville of Billingbear).

At the outbreak of the Civil War, Henry Brooke declared his support for Parliament in 1642 by signing the Cheshire Remonstrance. In so doing, he became the only major Parliamentary supporter in the northwest of the Bucklow Hundred. In 1643 he was appointed a colonel in the parliamentary army and in 1644 he was made High Sheriff of Cheshire, a post he held for four years.

By early 1643 most of Brooke's immediate neighbours were powerful Royalists, in particular John Savage, 2nd Earl Rivers of Rocksavage and Sir Thomas Aston of Aston. Further afield the Royalist leader of Lancashire was James Stanley, 7th Earl of Derby. Brooke's house, Norton Priory had been well prepared for an attack. On 28 February 1643, Royalist forces arrived at Norton Priory. Despite being heavily outnumbered, their attack was repelled and the Royalists withdrew to Halton Castle. Norton Priory then provided a base from which to mount a successful attack on Warrington in May. The following month Sir Henry's forces besieged Halton Castle which was surrendered after three weeks. Norton Priory was not threatened again during the Civil War.

Following the Civil War, Henry purchased the Manor and Castle of Halton. He became magistrate at Farnworth and was elected as a Member of Parliament for Cheshire. In 1659 he joined others of the Presbyterian gentry to support George Booth in restoring the monarchy. He was imprisoned in Chester Castle but with the coming of the Restoration he was released and made the 1st Baronet of Norton Priory by Charles II in 1662.

Brooke married Mary, the daughter of Timothy Pusey of Selston, Nottingham. He was succeeded by his eldest son, Richard.

Baronetage of England
New creation	Baronet (of Norton Priory, Cheshire); 1662–1664	Succeeded by Richard Brooke
