= William Clegg (cricketer) =

English cricketer (1869–1949)

Personal information
- Full name: William Gavin Clegg
- Born: 29 June 1869; Altrincham, Cheshire, England
- Died: 18 May 1949 (aged 79); Delamere, Cheshire, England
- Batting: Right-handed
- Bowling: Right-arm medium

Domestic team information
- Years: Team
- 1891: Oxford University

Career statistics
Competition	First-class
Matches	2
Runs scored	35
Batting average	8.75
100s/50s	0/0
Top score	35
Balls bowled	137
Wickets	5
Bowling average	12.40
5 wickets in innings	0
10 wickets in match	0
Best bowling	3/35
Catches/stumpings	1/–
- Source: Cricinfo, 6 February 2020

William Gavin Clegg (29 June 1869 – 18 May 1949) was an English first-class cricketer.

The son of Neville Clegg, he was born at Altrincham in June 1869. He was educated at Winchester College, before going up to Magdalen College, Oxford. While studying at Oxford, Clegg made two appearances in first-class cricket for Oxford University in 1891, appearing against Gentlemen of England and H. Philipson's XI. He scored 35 runs in these matches, in addition to taking 5 wickets with best figures of 3 for 35. After graduating from Oxford, Clegg became a farmer. He served in the First World War in the Cheshire Regiment, being commissioned as a second lieutenant in January 1916. He later served as the High Sheriff of Cheshire in 1932. Clegg died in May 1949 at Delamere, Cheshire.
