= Toft Hall =

Country house in Cheshire, England, UK

Coordinates: 53.28272°N 2.37062°W

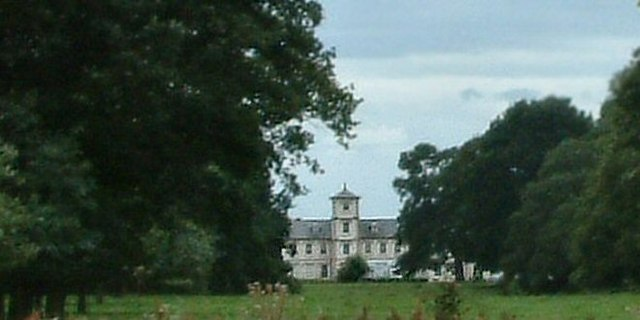
Toft Hall

Toft Hall is a 17th-century country house in Toft, Cheshire, England to which additions and alterations have been made during the following three centuries.

It is constructed in brick, which has been rendered, with stone dressings and a slate roof. It is in two storeys, and has four-storey towers. The house is recorded in the National Heritage List for England as a designated Grade II* listed building. Its stable block is listed separately at Grade II.

Features of the estate include an arched stone bridge, a ha-ha, a woodland garden and parkland.

== History ==
The Toft estate came into the Leycester family when Ralph Leycester of Tabley married heiress Joan Toft of Toft in the late 14th century during the reign of Richard II. The hall itself was built in the later part of the 17th century "to an extremely old-fashioned layout".

Ralph Leycester (1763–1835), MP for Shaftesbury (1821–1830), commissioned the London architect Samuel Pepys Cockerell to renovate the hall between 1810 and 1813. These improvements included the addition of a library, dining-room and twin towers. Ralph was succeeded by his only son, Ralph Gerard Leycester (1817–1851) who was succeeded in turn by his son, Rafe Oswald Leycester (1844–1929). Rafe died childless and left the estate to his nephew, Cyril Leycester Maude Roxby (1877–1942) and in 1949 it was inherited by Cyril's nephew, Edmund Roxby (b. 1913).

During the Second World War Toft Hall was the site of a prisoner of war camp.

In 2010–12 the Hall was extensively renovated and extended with a rear orangery, to the designs of Mason Gillibrand Architects of Lancaster.

== See also ==
- Grade II* listed buildings in Cheshire East
- Listed buildings in Toft, Cheshire
