= Toft, Cheshire =

Village in Cheshire, England

Coordinates: 53.284899°N 2.368944°W

Toft
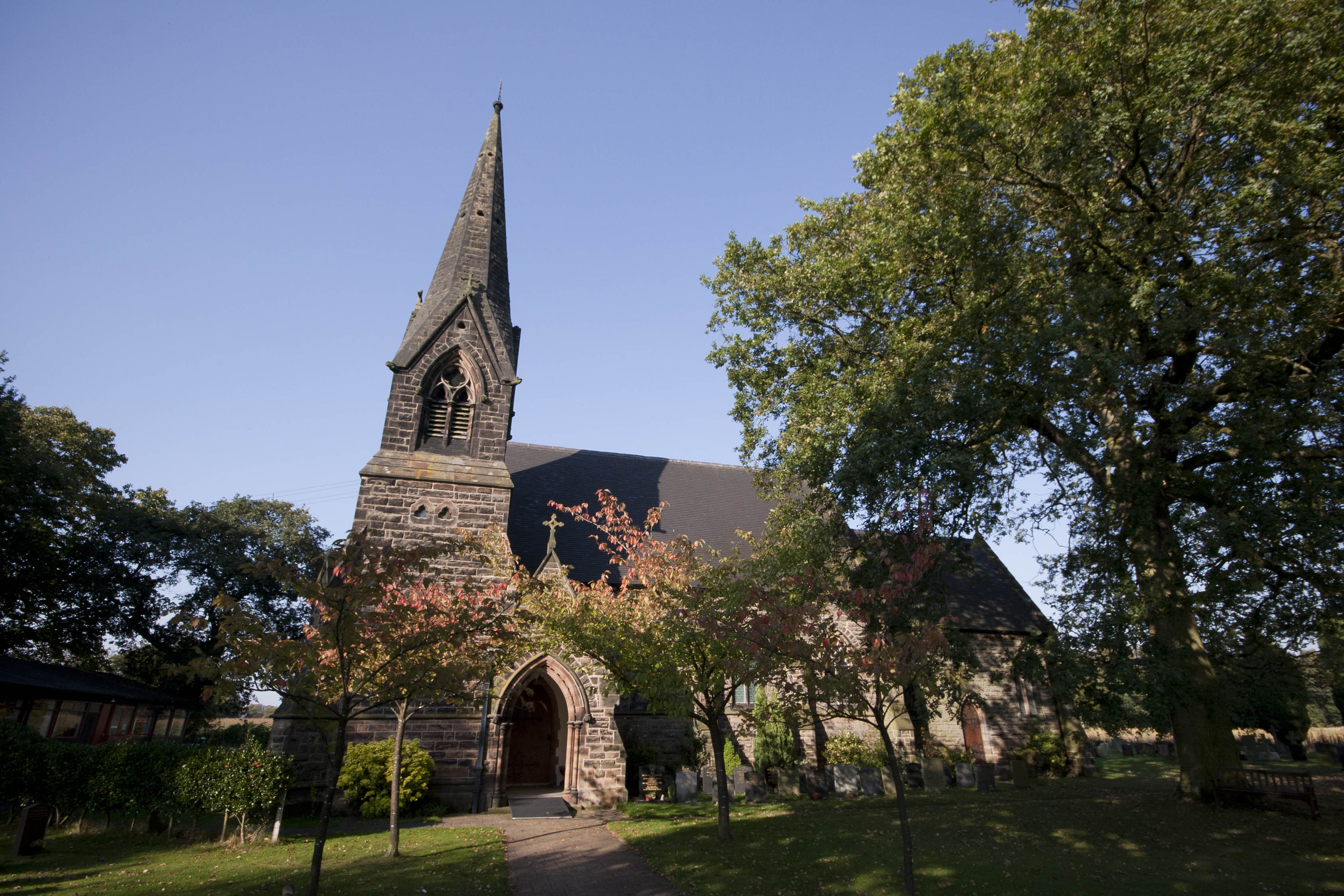
- Toft Parish Church

- Location within Cheshire
- Population: 81 (2001)
- OS grid reference: SJ755765
- Civil parish: Toft
- Unitary authority: Cheshire East
- Ceremonial county: Cheshire
- Region: North West
- Country: England
- Sovereign state: United Kingdom
- Post town: KNUTSFORD
- Postcode district: WA16
- Police: Cheshire
- Fire: Cheshire
- Ambulance: North West
- UK Parliament: Tatton

Toft is a village and civil parish in the unitary authority of Cheshire East and the ceremonial county of Cheshire, England. It is located immediately to the south of Knutsford and is split by the A50 road to more southern Holmes Chapel. The village comprises several farms and a small picturesque church.

The parish has a population of only 81, and shares a parish council with the neighbouring parishes of Plumley and Bexton. At the 2011 census the population of the civil parish remained less than 100. Details are included in the civil parish of Peover Inferior.

== Toft Hall ==
Toft Hall is a 17th-century country house, now used as business premises. In 1809, the hall was renovated, the park landscaped and a mere and island constructed. Other features include an arched stone bridge, ha-ha, woodland garden, "cat house" and remains of a formal garden. Much of the grounds are now used as farmland.

== Sport ==
Toft Cricket Club is an established member of the Cheshire County League, currently playing in the ECB premier division of the Cheshire County Cricket League. The club's greatest accolade was winning the National Village Championship trophy in 1989. Toft CC are based at Booths Park, Chelford Road which is actually in the neighbouring town of Knutsford.

== See also ==
- Listed buildings in Toft, Cheshire
