= Somerford Park, Cheshire =

Country house in Cheshire, England

Coordinates: 53.18°N 2.28°W

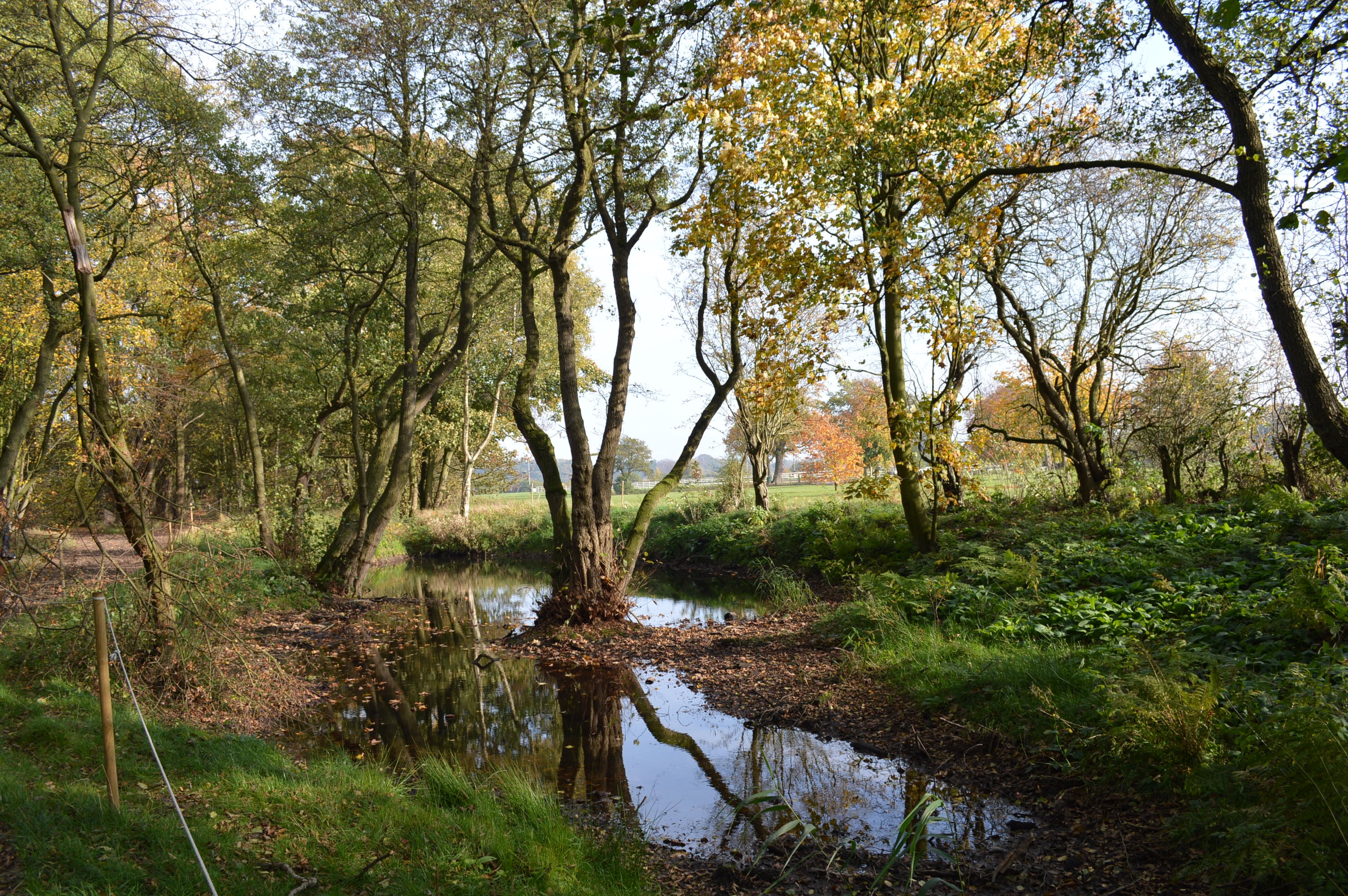
Somerford Park Farm: pool next to farm ride © Jonathan Hutchins

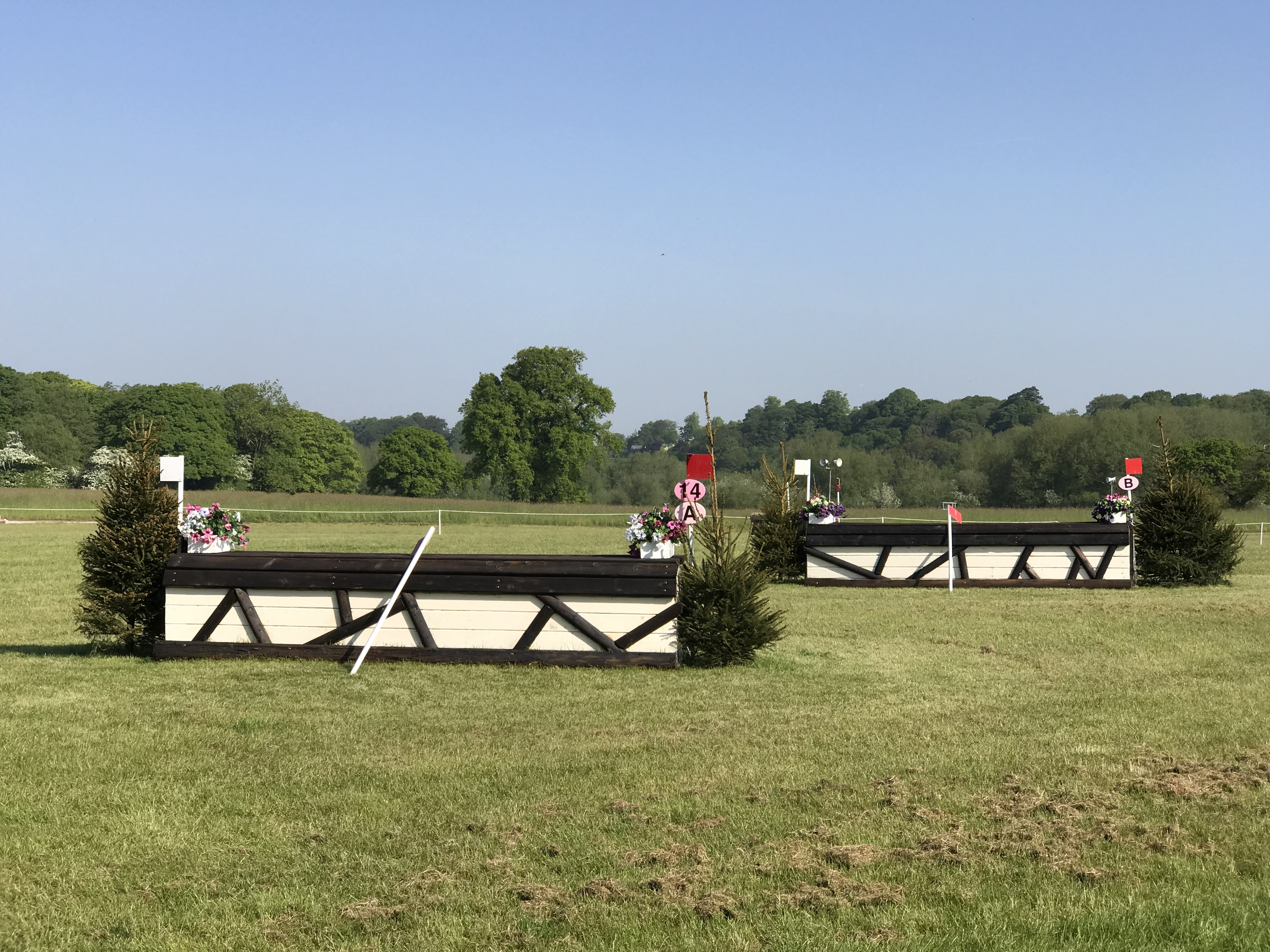
Cross-country fences at Somerford Park Horse Trials © Jonathan Hutchins

Somerford Park is situated off the A54 road midway between Congleton and Holmes Chapel in Cheshire. Somerfield Hall was a Georgian brick-built country house which used to stand in the park as the seat of the Shakerley Baronets family, but was demolished in 1926.

The original house was built around 1720 for Peter Shakerley. The Shakerleys had owned land in the area since the reign of Henry III. Several generations of the Shakerley family had previously lived at Hulme Hall near Northwich since the mid-15th century before the family moved to Somerford. The house was then extended in the 18th century by architect Thomas Farnolls Pritchard and enlarged again around 1800 by Lawrence Robinson of Middleton, Lancashire by the addition of a large rectangular wing at right angles to the existing 9-bay house. The new front faced the park and boasted a central domed bow. The house was then altered by Anthony Salvin for Sir Charles Watkin Shakerley in 1859-60 with the addition of an Italianate porch. The parkland was laid out in the 19th century by John Webb.

The house was demolished in 1926 and much of the parkland turned into farmland, although the chapel, icehouse and 18th-century stables survive, but in a ruinous condition. All Saints Chapel is listed Grade II*. An equestrian centre was established on part of the estate in 1976.
