= Mere, Cheshire =

Village and civil parish in Cheshire, England

Coordinates: 53.339°N 2.406°W

Mere
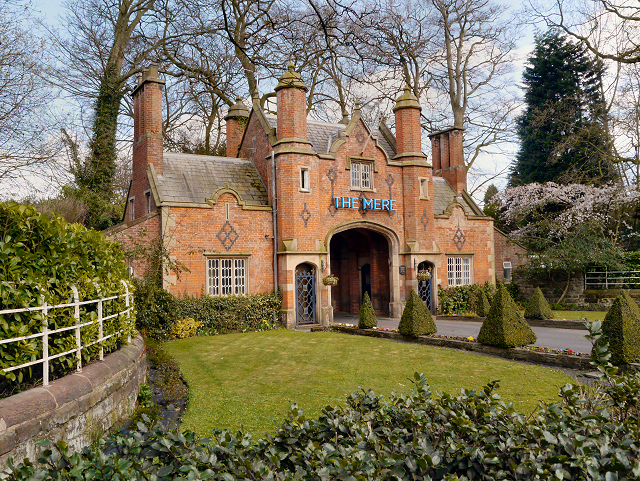
- Entrance to the Mere Golf and Country Club

- Location within Cheshire
- OS grid reference: SJ729826
- Civil parish: Mere
- Unitary authority: Cheshire East
- Ceremonial county: Cheshire
- Region: North West
- Country: England
- Sovereign state: United Kingdom
- Post town: KNUTSFORD
- Postcode district: WA16
- Dialling code: 01565
- Police: Cheshire
- Fire: Cheshire
- Ambulance: North West
- UK Parliament: Tatton

Mere is a civil parish and linear village along the old course of the A556 road in the unitary authority of Cheshire East and the ceremonial county of Cheshire, North West England, about 4 miles (6.4 km) south-west of Altrincham. Bucklow Hill is at its northeast end, and the Mere crossroads is at the southwest end. The village of Mere is about a mile long and has a varied stock of housing. Most houses are large and have ample gardens leading down to the lake; these are along the inner sides of a triangle formed by the A556, A50 and A5034 roads. Inside the triangle is a lake after which Mere was named, and a golf and country club.

== Geography ==
The village of Mere has three hotels (The Swan, The Mere Resort and Spa (formerly known as Mere Golf and Country Club) and Mere Court Hotel), a filling station (Orchard Service Station), and two car dealers (Bucklow Hill Garage and Parkside Cars). At Hoo Green (about half a mile west of Mere) is a hotel called The Kilton, and a post office which also functions as a newsagent and grocer. Knutsford and Altrincham are the nearest towns where a broader range of shops can be found. The Parish Club has facilities for bowling, cricket and snooker. The Mere Golf and Country Club (renamed The Mere Resort and Spa, or known just as The Mere) underwent large development plans, which has seen the relocation of the members' area and pro shop to accommodate the new hotel rooms. It contains some of the top golf players of Cheshire and houses a fairly competent league two tennis team.

== Transport ==
Motor traffic was a considerable problem for many years, with approximately 60,000 cars travelling through Mere each day. The A556 bypass opened in 2017, drastically reducing traffic problems and transforming the local roads

== Notable buildings ==
There are two halls in Mere: Mere Old Hall dates from the Regency period and has some decorative features in that style. Mere New Hall was built in 1834, and the architect used the style of the Elizabethan period. It is a brick-built mansion consisting of a medium-sized central block and a long L-shaped wing on one side. The central portion is symmetrical at the rear and has a porte-cochère at the front. The interiors are also in the Elizabethan style.

== See also ==
- Listed buildings in Mere, Cheshire
- Murder of Jacqueline Ansell-Lamb, an unsolved murder in the village in 1970
