= Norton, Runcorn =

Area of Runcorn, Cheshire, England

Coordinates: 53.333°N 2.668°W

Norton
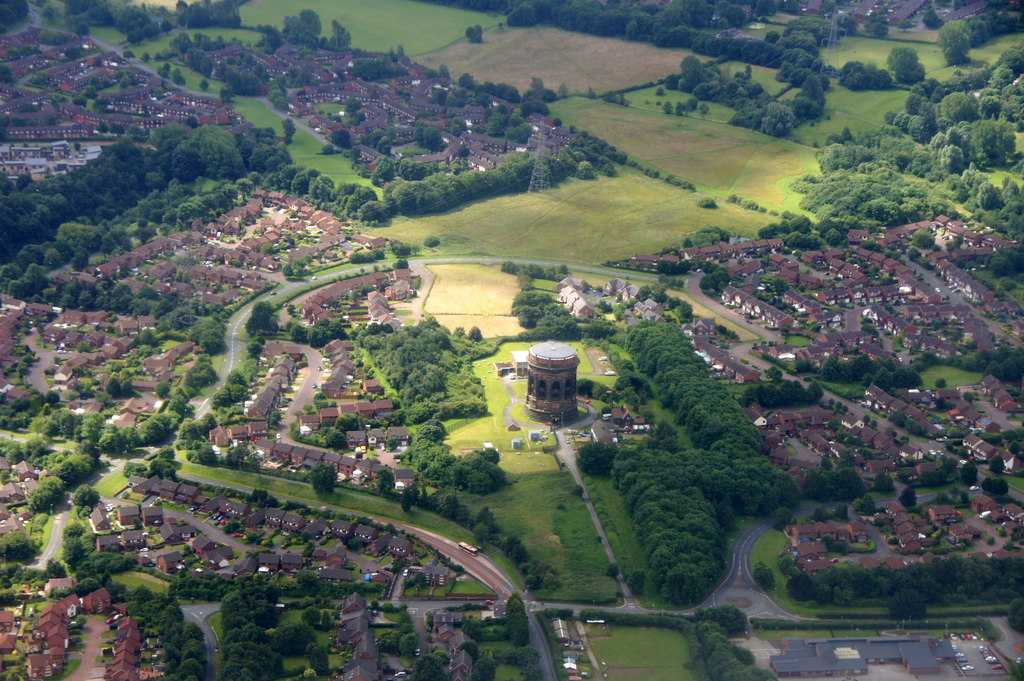
- Aerial view of Norton with Norton Water Tower in the centre

- Location within Cheshire
- Unitary authority: Halton
- Ceremonial county: Cheshire
- Region: North West
- Country: England
- Sovereign state: United Kingdom
- Police: Cheshire
- Fire: Cheshire
- Ambulance: North West

Norton is an area in the eastern part of the town of Runcorn, in the Halton district, in the ceremonial county of Cheshire, England. It was originally a separate village 3 miles (5 km) to the east of Runcorn, but in the 1970s and 1980s became absorbed within Runcorn by the expansion of its new town.

== History ==
In the Domesday Book of 1086, Norton (spelt as Nortune) was held as two manors. The major event in the early history of the settlement came in 1134 when William fitz William, the third Baron of Halton, moved a community of canons from a site near Runcorn Gap to a site near the village to found Norton Priory. In 1888–92 Norton Water Tower was built to the south of the village as a balancing reservoir on the water pipeline between Lake Vyrnwy in North Wales and Liverpool. Norton remained a small community until the growth of the new town.

Norton was formerly a township in the parish of Runcorn, in 1866 Norton became a separate civil parish, on 1 April 1967 the parish was abolished and merged with Runcorn and Daresbury. In 1961 the parish had a population of 126.

== Present day ==
The area is currently residential and is divided into two electoral wards. Norton North has a population of 6,494, and Norton South of 7,227.

== See also ==
- Listed buildings in Runcorn (urban area)
