= Iddinshall =

Coordinates: 53.158°N 2.697°W

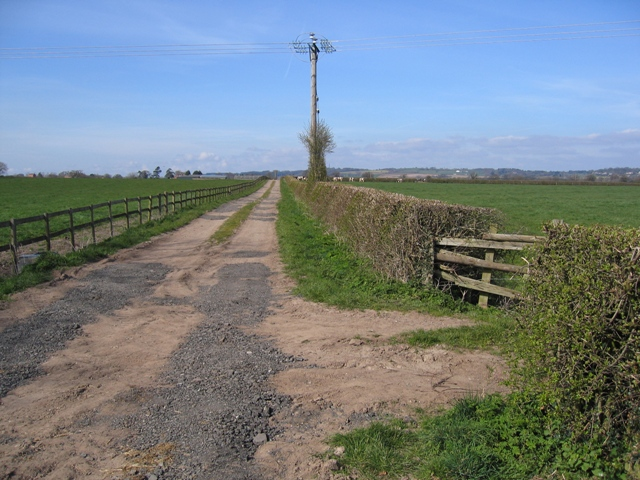
- Track to Iddenshall Grange

- Location within Cheshire
- Population: 42 (2001)
- OS grid reference: SJ5362
- Civil parish: Clotton Hoofield
- Unitary authority: Cheshire West and Chester
- Ceremonial county: Cheshire
- Region: North West
- Country: England
- Sovereign state: United Kingdom
- Post town: TARPORLEY
- Postcode district: CW6
- Dialling code: 01829
- Police: Cheshire
- Fire: Cheshire
- Ambulance: North West
- UK Parliament: Chester South and Eddisbury

Iddinshall is a former civil parish, now in the parish of Clotton Hoofield, in the Cheshire West and Chester district and ceremonial county of Cheshire in England. In 2001 it had a population of 42. Iddinshall was formerly a liberty in the parish of St Oswald, in 1866 Iddinshall became a separate civil parish, on 1 April 2015 the parish was abolished and merged with Clotton Hoofield.

The parish contained one listed building, Iddinshall Hall, which is recorded in the National Heritage List for England as a designated Grade II listed building. This is a brick farmhouse dating from the 18th century. To the southeast of the building is a moated site, formerly occupied by a building also known as Iddenshall Hall, which had been demolished by 1810. The site is a scheduled monument.
