= Mere Old Hall =

Coordinates: 53.33058°N 2.41574°W

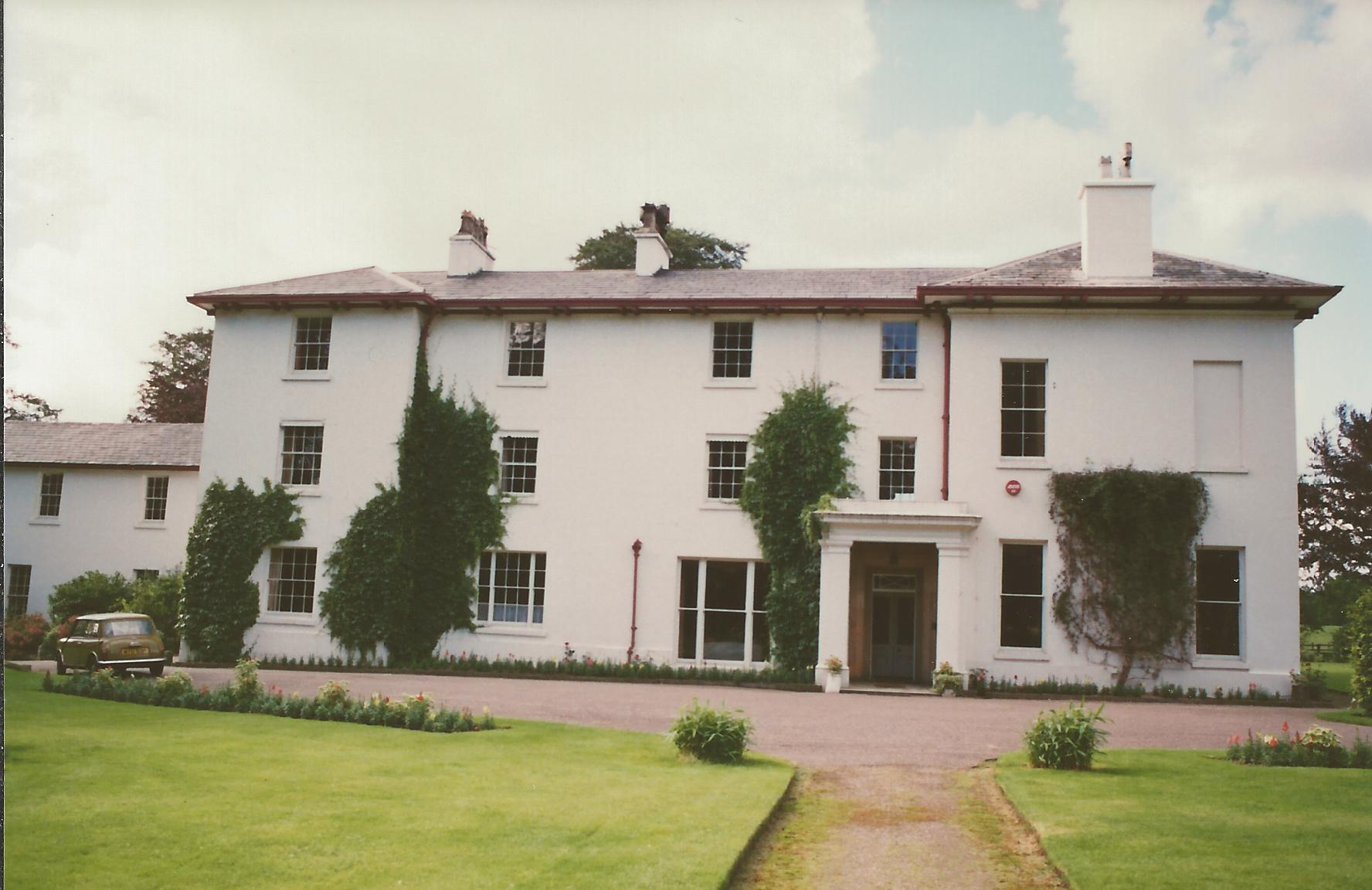
The house in 1984.

Mere Old Hall is a 17th-century country house which stands to the west of the village of Mere and the junction of the A566 and A50 roads in Cheshire, England.

The house was constructed in brick and stone that has been whitewashed and rendered, roofed with tiles and slates, and is in two and three storeys. Its architectural style is Regency. The house is recorded in the National Heritage List for England as a designated Grade II listed building. Also separately listed at Grade II are the kitchen garden walls and attached sheds.

== History ==
An earlier house on the site was rebuilt in the 17th century by Sir Peter Brooke MP, a member of the Brooke family of Norton Priory, who had bought the house in 1652 from the Mere family. It was extended in stages, and by the early 18th century had become a large brick house with eleven bays by nine bays. Later a bow window with a dome was built as an entrance, and later still pavilions were added. During the 19th century the house was reduced in size to an L-shaped building.

Sir Peter's grandson, Peter Langford-Brooke, built Mere New Hall in 1834 and let the Old Hall. Among the tenants were merchants and manufacturers from Manchester, including the calico printer William Graham Crum, whose son John Macleod Campbell Crum was born there in 1872.

In 1914 William Princep Langford-Brooke decided to move back to the Old Hall after renovating the interior in the Adam style. The last male heir, Colonel Ronald Langford-Brooke, died in 1980. Following the death of his widow in 1993, the Old Hall and its contents were sold in May 1994.

== See also ==
- Listed buildings in Mere, Cheshire
- Mere New Hall
