= Macclesfield (borough) =

English local government district

Borough of Macclesfield
- Shown within Cheshire
- History
  - Origin: Macclesfield Municipal Borough; Alderley Edge Urban District; Bollington Urban District; Knutsford Urban District; Wilmslow Urban District; Disley Rural District; Macclesfield Rural District; Bucklow Rural District (part of)
  - Created: 1 April 1974
  - Abolished: 31 March 2009
  - Succeeded by: Cheshire East
- Status: Non-metropolitan district
- ONS code: 13UG
  - HQ: Macclesfield

Macclesfield was, from 1974 to 2009, a local government district with borough status in Cheshire, England. It included the towns of Bollington, Knutsford, Macclesfield and Wilmslow and within its wider area the villages and hamlets of Adlington, Disley, Gawsworth, Kerridge, Pott Shrigley, Poynton, Prestbury, Rainow, Styal, Sutton and Tytherington.

== History ==
The district was formed on 1 April 1974 under the Local Government Act 1972. It was a merger of Macclesfield municipal borough, Alderley Edge, Bollington, Knutsford and Wilmslow urban districts, along with the single parish Disley Rural District, Macclesfield Rural District and part of Bucklow Rural District. The new district was awarded borough status from its creation.

In 2006 the Department for Communities and Local Government considered reorganising Cheshire's administrative structure as part of the 2009 structural changes to local government in England. The decision to merge the boroughs of Macclesfield, Congleton and Crewe and Nantwich to create a single unitary authority was announced on 25 July 2007, following a consultation period in which a proposal to create a single Cheshire unitary authority was rejected.

The Borough of Macclesfield was abolished on 1 April 2009, when the new Cheshire East unitary authority was formed.

== Civil parishes ==
The borough contained 52 civil parishes and 2 discrete unparished areas (namely, the towns of Macclesfield and Wilmslow). Of the 52 civil parishes, five (Agden, Little Bollington, Macclesfield Forest and Wildboarclough, Tatton, and Wincle) held parish meetings rather than elect a parish council. Of the remaining 47 civil parishes, two contained towns (Bollington and Knutsford) and so had town councils rather than parish councils administering them. A number of adjacent or abutting civil parishes were grouped together under a single parish council: Ollerton with Marthall, Plumley with Toft and Bexton, and Tabley (for the parishes of Tabley Inferior and Tabley Superior) The remaining 37 civil parishes had their own parish council.

The following civil parishes were included in the borough:

- Adlington
- Agden
- Alderley Edge
- Ashley
- Aston by Budworth
- Bexton
- Bollington (town)
- Bosley
- Chelford
- Chorley
- Disley
- Eaton
- Gawsworth
- Great Warford
- Henbury
- High Legh
- Higher Hurdsfield
- Kettleshulme
- Knutsford (town)
- Little Bollington
- Little Warford
- Lower Withington
- Lyme Handley
- Macclesfield Forest and Wildboarclough
- Marthall
- Marton
- Mere
- Millington
- Mobberley
- Mottram St Andrew
- Nether Alderley
- North Rode
- Ollerton
- Over Alderley
- Peover Inferior
- Peover Superior
- Pickmere
- Plumley
- Pott Shrigley
- Poynton with Worth
- Prestbury
- Rainow
- Rostherne
- Siddington
- Snelson
- Sutton
- Tabley Inferior
- Tabley Superior
- Tatton
- Toft
- Wincle

== Political control ==
The town of Macclesfield had been a municipal borough from 1836 to 1974 with a borough council. The first elections to the new Macclesfield Borough created under the Local Government Act 1972 were held in 1973, initially operating as a shadow authority until the new arrangements came into effect on 1 April 1974. Political control of the council from 1974 until its abolition in 2009 was as follows:

Party in control	Years
No overall control	1974–1976
Conservative	1976–2009

=== Leadership ===
The leaders of the council from 1983 were:

Councillor	Party	From	To
Margaret Duddy	Conservative	1983	2001
Peter Burns	Conservative	2001	May 2004
Sue Kipling	Conservative	2004	23 Sep 2004
Wesley Fitzgerald	Conservative	2004	2008
Frank Keegan	Conservative	2008	2009

The penultimate leader, Wesley Fitzgerald, went on to become the first leader of Cheshire East Council.

=== Composition ===
The political composition of the council at its abolition in 2009 was:

Party	Councillors
Conservative	38
Liberal Democrat	12
Labour	6
Handforth Ratepayer	2
Independent	2

== Council elections ==
- 1973 Macclesfield Borough Council election
- 1976 Macclesfield Borough Council election
- 1979 Macclesfield Borough Council election (New ward boundaries)
- 1980 Macclesfield Borough Council election
- 1982 Macclesfield Borough Council election
- 1983 Macclesfield Borough Council election (Borough boundary changes took place but the number of seats remained the same)
- 1984 Macclesfield Borough Council election
- 1986 Macclesfield Borough Council election
- 1987 Macclesfield Borough Council election
- 1988 Macclesfield Borough Council election
- 1990 Macclesfield Borough Council election
- 1991 Macclesfield Borough Council election
- 1992 Macclesfield Borough Council election
- 1994 Macclesfield Borough Council election (Borough boundary changes took place but the number of seats remained the same)
- 1995 Macclesfield Borough Council election
- 1996 Macclesfield Borough Council election
- 1998 Macclesfield Borough Council election
- 1999 Macclesfield Borough Council election (New ward boundaries)
- 2000 Macclesfield Borough Council election
- 2002 Macclesfield Borough Council election
- 2003 Macclesfield Borough Council election
- 2004 Macclesfield Borough Council election
- 2006 Macclesfield Borough Council election
- 2007 Macclesfield Borough Council election

=== Results maps ===
2002 results map

2003 results map

2004 results map

2006 results map

2007 results map

=== By-election results ===
North East By-Election 20 June 1996
Party	Candidate	Votes	%	±%
Liberal Democrats		1,278	50.5	
Conservative		1,008	39.8	
Labour		245	9.7	
Majority		270	10.7	
Turnout		2,531	37.0	
Liberal Democrats hold		Swing		

Prestbury By-Election 12 September 1996
Party	Candidate	Votes	%	±%
Conservative		967	78.8	
Liberal Democrats		259	21.1	
Majority		708	57.7	
Turnout		1,226	28.0	
Conservative hold		Swing		

Plumley By-Election 3 July 1997
Party	Candidate	Votes	%	±%
Conservative		506	56.3	−1.3
Liberal Democrats		392	43.7	+12.6
Majority		114	12.6	
Turnout		898	46.0	
Conservative hold		Swing		

Knutsford Over By-Election 4 November 1999
Party	Candidate	Votes	%	±%
Conservative		478	52.5	+12.3
Labour		275	30.2	+7.5
Independent		120	13.2	−3.9
Liberal Democrats		38	4.2	−7.0
Majority		203	22.3	
Turnout		911	21.9	
Conservative hold		Swing		

Knutsford Bexton By-Election 1 February 2001
Party	Candidate	Votes	%	±%
Liberal Democrats		346	45.9	+11.3
Conservative		336	44.6	−0.9
Labour		72	9.5	−10.5
Majority		10	1.3	
Turnout		754	34.1	
Liberal Democrats gain from Conservative		Swing		

Morley and Styal By-Election 5 April 2001
Party	Candidate	Votes	%	±%
Liberal Democrats		857	59.6	+12.6
Conservative		580	40.4	+2.8
Majority		277	19.2	
Turnout		1,437	36.7	
Liberal Democrats hold		Swing		

Macclesfield West By-Election 7 June 2001
Party	Candidate	Votes	%	±%
Labour		1,290	60.0	+0.8
Conservative		538	25.0	+4.5
Liberal Democrats		321	14.9	+0.4
Majority		752	35.0	
Turnout		2,149		
Labour hold		Swing		

Pornton Central By-Election 7 June 2001
Party	Candidate	Votes	%	±%
Conservative		1,621	45.5	−8.5
Liberal Democrats		1,187	33.3	−2.0
Labour		756	21.2	+10.5
Majority		434	12.2	
Turnout		3,564		
Conservative hold		Swing		

Bollington West By-Election 31 July 2003
Party	Candidate	Votes	%	±%
Liberal Democrats	Shirley Sockett	434	62.6	+41.4
Conservative		162	23.4	−17.4
Labour		97	14.0	−24.0
Majority		272	39.2	
Turnout		693	36.6	
Liberal Democrats gain from Conservative		Swing		

Hurdsfield By-Election 27 November 2003
Party	Candidate	Votes	%	±%
Liberal Democrats		467	56.3	−0.3
Conservative		212	25.5	+9.0
Labour		151	18.2	−8.7
Majority		255	30.8	
Turnout		830	24.7	
Liberal Democrats hold		Swing		

Knutsford Nether By-Election 16 September 2004
Party	Candidate	Votes	%	±%
Conservative	Vivien Davies	385	61.1	−8.0
Liberal Democrats	Paul Moss	199	31.6	+12.6
Labour		46	7.3	−4.6
Majority		186	29.5	
Turnout		630	30.4	
Conservative hold		Swing		

Plumley By-Election 5 May 2005
Party	Candidate	Votes	%	±%
Conservative	Edward Fisher	789	63.3	−25.6
Liberal Democrats	Heulwen Barlow	329	26.4	+26.4
Labour	Laurences Hobday	129	10.3	−0.8
Majority		460	36.9	
Turnout		1,247	65.3	
Conservative hold		Swing		

Prestbury By-Election 26 January 2006
Party	Candidate	Votes	%	±%
Conservative	Nicholas Stratford	950	89.5	+89.5
Liberal Democrats	Anne Goddard	112	10.5	−26.5
Majority		838	79.0	
Turnout		1,062	25.0	
Conservative gain from Independent		Swing		

Hurdsfield By-Election 20 July 2006
Party	Candidate	Votes	%	±%
Liberal Democrats	Enid Tomlinson	500	58.2	+5.2
Labour	Simon Truss	178	20.7	−3.9
Conservative	Matthew Davies	82	9.6	−12.8
Independent	Fred Grundy	53	6.2	+6.2
Green	John Knight	45	5.2	+5.2
Majority		322	37.5	
Turnout		858	25.2	
Liberal Democrats hold		Swing		

== Aldermen and Freeman of the borough ==
The following is a list of people who have been either an Alderman or Freeman of the borough of Macclesfield, and when the title was bestowed.

=== Individuals ===
- Edward Eaton JP (Alderman ???)
- General Sir William Bromley-Davenport (Freeman ???)
