= Astle (disambiguation) =

Astle is an English surname of multiple origins.

Astle may also refer to:

== Places ==
- Astle, New Brunswick, a community in the Canadian province of New Brunswick
- Astle, Cheshire East, England; see list of United Kingdom locations
  - Astle Hall, a country house in Cheshire, England; see also Chelford Manor House
  - Astle Park, in Cheshire, England

== See also ==
- Astley (disambiguation)
