= Listed buildings in Chelford =

Chelford is a civil parish in Cheshire East, England. It contains nine buildings that are recorded in the National Heritage List for England as designated listed buildings. Of these, three are listed at Grade II*, the middle grade, and the other six are at Grade II. Apart from the village of Chelford, which is in the western part of the parish, to the west of the railway, and well to the west of the Chelford Roundabout, where the A535 road meets the A537. The listed buildings are to the south and east of the roundabout. Most of them are houses and cottages, the other listed buildings being farm buildings, a church and a bridge.

== Key ==
Grade	Criteria
II*	Particularly important buildings of more than special interest
II	Buildings of national importance and special interest

== Buildings ==
Name and location	Photograph	Date	Notes	Grade
Tithe barn, The Manor House; 53.26466°N 2.27106°W	—	Late 16th century	Originating as a tithe barn, the building was later used for storage. It is timber-framed with brick infill and has a stone-slate roof. An original doorway has been blocked, and two 20th-century doorways added to the west front. On the east front are two double barn doors.	II
The Manor House; 53.26418°N 2.27107°W	—	Early 17th century	The manor house was extended in 1671, and further altered in the 19th and 20th centuries. It is timber-framed with brick infill and has roofs of slate and cement tiles. The house has a complex plan, and is in two and three storeys. The windows are casements. Inside the house are two full crucks and an inglenook.	II*
Church Cottages; 53.26272°N 2.27270°W	—	Early 17th century	A row of three cottages. The central and right cottages date from the 17th century, they are basically timber-framed and were later encased in brick; the right cottage dates from the 19th century and is brick. The roofs are in stone slate. The older cottages have gabled dormers. All the windows are casements.	II
The Old Rectory; 53.26533°N 2.27332°W	—	Late 17th century	A timber-framed house with brick infill that has been largely encased in, or replaced by, brick. The roof is in stone-slate, and the windows are casements. The north end is gabled and contains a window and a door in the ground floor. The first floor is slightly jettied and contains a jettied window. The gable above this is further jettied.	II
The Lodge; 53.26175°N 2.27368°W	—	late 18th to early 19th century century	This is the lodge to Astle Hall, which has been mostly demolished. It is constructed in brick with a stone-slate roof. The lodge is in cottage orné style, has two storeys, and an entrance front of three bays. The central bay projects forward, and contains a four-light window with interlacing tracery. The lateral bays contain two-light windows with Y-tracery. In front of the house is a verandah supported by tree trunks, and containing a gabled dormer.	II*
Astle Farm East Farmhouse; 53.26126°N 2.25516°W	—	Early 18th century	A brick farmhouse on a stone plinth with a slate roof. It is in three storeys, and has a front of two bays. The windows are casements, and at the rear is a staircase window.	II
The Ivy House; 53.26563°N 2.27257°W	—	Mid- to late 18th century	This originated as a farmhouse. It is built in brick and has a slate roof. The house is in three storeys, and has a symmetrical front with three bays. In the centre is a gabled porch. The windows are casements, and in the centre and right bays of the top storey there are blank panels.	II
St John the Evangelist's Church; 53.26239°N 2.27268°W		1774–76	St John's replaced an earlier church on the site. The tower was added in 1840, and the chancel was extended in 1902. The church is built in brick with stone dressings and a slate roof. It consists of a nave, a chancel, and a west tower. Inside the church is a west gallery, now converted into a meeting room, 18th-century box pews, and wall paintings in Art Nouveau style.	II*
Chelford Bridge South; 53.26203°N 2.27315°W		Late 18th century	The bridge carries the A535 road over Snape Brook. It is a single span stone bridge with curving retaining walls on each end. The arch has voussoirs an extended keystone. On each side are pilaster buttresses. The parapet dates from the 19th century.	II

== See also ==
- Listed buildings in Marthall
- Listed buildings in Nether Alderley
- Listed buildings in Siddington
- Listed buildings in Lower Withington
- Listed buildings in Snelson
