= Listed buildings in Lower Withington =

Lower Withington is a civil parish in Cheshire East, England. It contains 21 buildings that are recorded in the National Heritage List for England as designated listed buildings. Of these, one is listed at Grade I, the highest grade, one is listed at Grade II*, the middle grade, and the others are at Grade II. Apart from the village of Lower Withington, the parish is rural. The major building is Willington Hall, the present building dating from about 2000, and replacing earlier halls on the site. Five of the listed buildings are associated with the hall, including a sarcophagus in the garden, which dates from the Roman era. The parish includes part of Jodrell Bank Observatory, and five buildings on the site are listed. The other listed buildings are houses, farmhouses, cottages, and associated structures, seven of them timber-framed buildings dating back to the 17th century.

== Key ==
Grade	Criteria
I	Buildings of exceptional interest, sometimes considered to be internationally important
II*	Particularly important buildings of more than special interest
II	Buildings of national importance and special interest

== Buildings ==
Name and location	Photograph	Date	Notes	Grade
Roman sarcophagus, Withington Hall; 53.24670°N 2.28393°W	—	Early 3rd century	The sarcophagus is in marble and consists of a bowl with straight sides and rounded ends. It is carved with figures and decoration. The figures consist of the Three Graces, and a husband and wife with a smaller figure. The decoration includes straight and S-shaped flutings.	II*
Welltrough Hall Farmhouse; 53.21739°N 2.27523°W	—	Early to mid-17th century	The farmhouse is timber-framed with rendered infill and has been partly encased in brick. The whole house stands on a stone plinth, and it has a stone slate roof. It is in two storeys, with a projecting gabled wing to the right. The upper storey is slightly jettied. There is a porch in the angle between the wing and the main block. The windows are casements.	II
Lapwing Cottage; 53.24876°N 2.26831°W		Mid-17th century	This was extended in the 19th and 20th centuries. It is a timber-framed house with rendered infill and a slate roof. The house is in two storeys and has a two-bay front. The windows are casements, the window in the upper storey being in a gabled dormer.	II
Pitt Farmhouse; 53.22629°N 2.27396°W	—	Mid-17th century	A farmhouse that was extended in the 19th century. It is partly timber-framed with brick infill, and partly in brick, with roofs of stone and slate. The house is in two storeys. The entrance front is in brick and has three bays; the rear is timber-framed. The windows are casements	II
Smiths Green Farmhouse; 53.23511°N 2.28607°W	—	1658pic	A timber-framed farmhouse with infill partly in brick and partly in wattle and daub. The roof is tiled, and the house is in two storeys with a gabled wing on the left. The date and initials are inscribed on a bressumer between the floors. The windows are casements	II
Harop Green Farmhouse; 53.23439°N 2.26932°W	—	Mid- to late 17th century	A farmhouse partly timber-framed with brick infill and partly in brick. It has a slate roof. Some of the internal walls have wattle and daub infill.	II
Little Orchard; 53.24042°N 2.29744°W	—	1667	A timber-framed house with rendered infill and a slate roof. It is in two storeys and has a slightly projecting left gabled bay. The windows are casements; in the upper storey they are in two gabled dormers.	II
Bate Mill Cottage; 53.24502°N 2.30231°W	—	Late 17th century	A timber-framed cottage with brick infill on a rendered plinth. It has a corrugated asbestos roof. Originally in a single storey, it was raised to two storeys in the 19th century. The cottage is in three bays, with a central 20th-century oriel window. The other windows are casements.	II
Brode Hall Cottage; 53.22368°N 2.27443°W	—	Early 18th century	A brick cottage on a stone plinth with stone dressings. It is in two storeys and has a three-bay front. The windows are casements. Above the door and the windows are flat arches with keystones.	II
Kitchen garden walls, Withington Hall; 53.24685°N 2.28491°W	—	18th century	The walls surround the former kitchen garden. They are in brick with stone copings. The east wall is crenellated, the others are plain. In the north wall is a gable containing a blocked circular opening. There are doorways in the east and west sides.	II
Gatepiers, Withington Hall; 53.25100°N 2.28468°W	—	Mid-18th century	The gate piers are at the entrance to the grounds of the hall from the A535 road. There are four piers, the central pair being larger than the outer two. They are in ashlar stone, and have a square plan. The piers are rusticated, and at the top of each is a cornice and a large ball finial.	II
Dovecote, Withington Hall; 53.24727°N 2.28402°W	—	Mid-18th century	The dovecote is built in brick with stone dressings and a slate roof. It is in a single storey and has an octagonal plan. It has a doorway with rusticated quoins and a triple keystone. Above this and at the rear are circular windows. On the top is a moulded cornice and an octagonal wooden lantern with a lead dome and ball and a weathervane.	II
The Cheshire Hunt; 53.24183°N 2.29717°W	—	c. 1760	A house built for the Master of the Cheshire Hunt. It is in brick with a slate roof. The house is in three storeys and has a symmetrical three-bay front, with the central protruding slightly. The porch doorway has a semicircular arch, and the windows are sashes.	II
Stables, The Cheshire Hunt; 53.24169°N 2.29717°W	—	c. 1760	The stables were built for the Master of the Cheshire Hunt. They are in brick with stone dressings and a slate roof. On the road front is a doorway with a circular pitch hole above. Also on the front are ventilation holes in diamond and X-shaped patterns. On the right gable end is a square pitch hole. There are later extensions to the left.	II
Stable block, Withington Hall; 53.24758°N 2.28477°W	—	1797	The stable block is in brick with stone dressings and a slate roof. It is in two storeys, and consists of a central block of seven bays, and lateral wings, each of three bays. The middle of the central block has a pediment containing a circular clock face, and on the roof is an octagonal bellcote with a lead cupola and a ball finial. The windows are sashes.	II
War memorial 53.22837°N 2.29118°W	—	1921	The memorial stands on a junction near to St Peter's Church, and consists of a wooden hooded Calvary. The figure of Christ is carved in the round, and below it on the shaft is a metal plaque containing an inscription and the names of those lost in the First World War. It has not been updated for the Second World War.	II
71MHz Searchlight Aerial; 53.23411°N 2.30481°W	—	1946	The remains of the searchlight aerial are in Jodrell Bank Observatory. The aerial was converted from a Second World War trailer-mounted searchlight base. The aerial arrays are no longer present, but the remains of the searchlight's mount have survived; these consist of the trailer chassis fixed on a concrete plinth, a revolving mount, and two narrow concrete channels.	II
Electrical Workshop; 53.23504°N 2.30360°W	—	1949	The building in Jodrell Bank Observatory was its first permanent administrative and teaching building, and was originally the main office. It is in concrete, with metal window frames, a felt roof, a single storey, and a rectangular plan.	II
Link Hut (Cosmic Noise Hut); 53.23530°N 2.30523°W	—	1949	The hut was built for scientific research in Jodrell Bank Observatory. It was extended in 1953, and again in 1955 for Robert Hanbury Brown. The building is in concrete, with metal window frames, a felt roof, a single storey, and an L-shaped plan.	II
Park Royal Building; 53.23436°N 2.30393°W	—	1949	A single-storey concrete rectangular hut in Jodrell Bank Observatory, which was extended in 1963–64, and re-roofed in 2016. The hut has housed scientific apparatus, laboratories and research offices, and from the 1960s used to control the Mark II Telescope.	II
Mark II Telescope; 53.23397°N 2.30385°W		1962–64	A radio telescope in Jodrell Bank Observatory designed and built by Charles Husband to the requirements of Bernard Lovell on the site of the former Transit Telescope. It was the first telescope in the world to be steered by a digital computer. The telescope has a parabolic dish 125 feet (38 m) in diameter with a focal length of 40 feet (12 m). In 1987 it was upgraded with the addition of a circular surface of new aluminium panels.	I

== See also ==
- Listed buildings in Chelford
- Listed buildings in Goostrey
- Listed buildings in Marton
- Listed buildings in Peover Superior
- Listed buildings in Siddington
- Listed buildings in Snelson
- Listed buildings in Swettenham
- Listed buildings in Twemlow
