= Listed buildings in Marthall =

Marthall is a civil parish in Cheshire East, England. It contains four buildings that are recorded in the National Heritage List for England as designated listed buildings, all of which are at Grade II. This grade is the lowest of the three gradings given to listed buildings and is applied to "buildings of national importance and special interest". Apart from the village of Marthall, the parish is rural. The listed buildings consist of three farmhouses and a milepost.

Name and location	Photograph	Date	Notes
Fir Tree Farmhouse; 53.27793°N 2.27719°W	—	Late 17th to early 18th century	The farmhouse is built in brick and has a slate roof. It is in three storeys and has a three-bay front with a central porch. The windows are casements, those in the bottom and middle storeys having cambered heads, and those in the top storey with straight lintels.
Kell Green Hall Farmhouse; 53.28886°N 2.29878°W	—	Early 18th century	The brick farmhouse has stone dressings and a slate roof. It is in two storeys, and has a symmetrical three-bay front with quoins at the corners. The central doorway has a stone surround with a semicircular arched head and a keystone. The windows have flat heads with keystones. There are later extensions to the right and at the rear.
Brook Farmhouse; 53.29303°N 2.31496°W	—	Late 18th century	The farmhouse was extended in the 19th century. It is built in brick with a slate roof. The house is in three storeys, with a two-bay front containing a central gabled porch. The windows are casements with cambered heads.
Milepost; 53.27530°N 2.29518°W	—	c. 1830	The milepost is in cast iron and consists of a round post with an acorn finial. It carries a curved plate inscribed with the distances in miles from Marthall to Macclesfield and Knutsford.

== See also ==
- Listed buildings in Chelford
- Listed buildings in Great Warford
- Listed buildings in Knutsford
- Listed buildings in Mobberley
- Listed buildings in Nether Alderley
- Listed buildings in Peover Superior
- Listed buildings in Snelson
