= Turnpike trusts in North West England =

Historic road maintenance bodies in England

This is a list of turnpike trusts that maintained roads in North West England.

Between 1663 and 1836, the Parliament of Great Britain and the Parliament of the United Kingdom passed a series of acts of Parliament that created organisations – turnpike trusts – that collected road tolls, and used the money to repair the road. These applied to major roads, around a fifth of the road network. The turnpike system was phased out in the 1870s, and major roads transitioned in the 1880s to the maintenance of the new county councils.

The counties used for these lists are the historic counties of England that existed at the time of the turnpike trusts. This article lists those in the north west of England: Cheshire, Cumberland, Lancashire, and Westmorland.

== Cheshire ==
Trust	Founded	Initial act	
Trust	Founded	Citation	Title
Ashton Lane End and Frodsham Turnpike Trust	1786	26 Geo. 3. c. 139	Cheshire Roads Act 1786; An Act for widening, amending, and keeping in Repair the Road from Flookersbrook Bridge within the Township of Newton, near Chester, to the South End of Wilderspool Causeway, and from the Market Town of Frodsham to Ashton Lane End in the Township of Ashton, in the County of Chester.
Chester and Frodsham Turnpike Trust	1786	26 Geo. 3. c. 139	Cheshire Roads Act 1786; An Act for widening, amending, and keeping in Repair the Road from Flookersbrook Bridge within the Township of Newton, near Chester, to the South End of Wilderspool Causeway, and from the Market Town of Frodsham to Ashton Lane End in the Township of Ashton, in the County of Chester.
Chester and Tarvin Turnpike Trust	1769	9 Geo. 3. c. 94	Stafford and Chester Roads Act 1769; An Act for repealing so much of Two several Acts of Parliament, made and passed in the Seventeenth and Twenty-eighth Years of the Reign of His late Majesty King George the Second, as relate to the Road from the End of the County of Stafford, in the Post Road, towards the City of Chester, through Woor in the County of Salop, to Nantwich in the County of Chester, and from Nantwich to Tarporley, and from thence, through Tarvin in the said County of Chester, to the said City of Chester; and for more effectually repairing, widening, and supporting the same Road; and also for repairing and widening the Road from Northwich, in the said County of Chester, to the Cross in Tarvin aforesaid.
Chester and Whitchurch Turnpike Trust	1759	33 Geo. 2. c. 51	Chester to Birmingham Road Act 1759; An Act for repairing and widening the Road from the Bars at Boughton, within the Liberties of the City of Chester, to Whitchurch, and from thence to Newport in the County of Salop, to Ivetsey Bank in the County of Stafford, and from thence to Castle Bromwich and Stone Bridge in the Parish of Hampton on Arden, in the County of Warwick, and from Castle Bromwich to Birmingham in the same County.
Chester and Wrexham Turnpike Trust	1751	25 Geo. 2. c. 22	Shrewsbury and Wrexham Road Act 1751; An Act for repairing the Roads from the Town of Shrewsbury, through Ellesmere in the County of Salop, and Overton in the County of Flint, to Wrexham in the County of Denbigh.
Chester, Neston and Woodside Ferry Turnpike Trust	1787	27 Geo. 3. c. 93	Chester Roads Act 1787; An Act for amending and widening the Roads from the City of Chester to the Woodside Ferry in the Township of Birkenhead in the County of Chester, and from the said City to the Assembly House in Parkgate in the Township of Great Neston in the said County, and from Great Neston aforesaid to the said Woodside Ferry, and from the Road leading from the City of Chester to Parkgate aforesaid, to the Road leading from the same City to the said Woodside Ferry.
Congleton and Buxton Turnpike Trust; Congleton to Prestbury Turnpike Trust	1789	29 Geo. 3. c. 93	Chester and Derby Roads Act 1789; An Act for amending, widening, and keeping in Repair the Road leading from Congleton to Colley Bridge, and from the said Bridge to Smithy Green, in the Parish of Prestbury, in the County of Chester; and for setting out and making new Roads from Smithy Green aforesaid, to join a Branch from the Leek Turnpike Road at Thatchmarsh Bottom, in the Parish of Hartington in the County of Derby, and from the first mentioned Road to the Havannah Mills.
Cranage and Warrington Turnpike Trust	1753	26 Geo. 2. c. 62	Cheshire Roads Act 1753; An Act for repairing and widening the Roads from Henshall's Smithy, upon Cranage Green, through the Town of Nether Knutsford, and by the South Guide Post in Mere and Bucklow Hill, to the Town of Altrincham, in the County Palatine of Chester, and from the said Guide Post to Warrington, in the County of Lancaster, and from Bucklow Hill aforesaid to Penny's Lane, near Northwich, in the said County of Chester.
Frodsham and Wilderspool Turnpike Trust	1786	26 Geo. 3. c. 139	Cheshire Roads Act 1786; An Act for widening, amending, and keeping in Repair the Road from Flookersbrook Bridge within the Township of Newton, near Chester, to the South End of Wilderspool Causeway, and from the Market Town of Frodsham to Ashton Lane End in the Township of Ashton, in the County of Chester.
Hinderton and Birkenhead Turnpike Trust; Little Neston to Hoose Turnpike Trust	1826	7 Geo. 4. c. xix	Little Neston and Hoose, and Upton and Birkenhead Roads (Cheshire) Act 1826; An Act for making and maintaining a Turnpike Road, commencing at or near a certain House called The Shrewsbury Arms, situate at Hinderton in the Township of Little Neston, by way of Upton, and terminating in the Township of Hoose, and from Upton aforesaid to the Township of Birkenhead, and also certain Branches of Road to communicate therewith, all in the County Palatine of Chester.
Holmes Chapel and Chelford Turnpike Trust	1797	37 Geo. 3. c. 157	Hulmes Chapel and Chelford Road Act 1797; An Act for amending, altering, widening, improving, and keeping in repair, the road from the present turnpike road at Hulmes Chapel in the county palatine of Chester, leading from Hulmes Chapel to Knutsford, to the south bridge in Chelford, in the said county, near to Chelford Chapel.
Hyde and Mottram Turnpike Trust; Manchester, Hyde and Mottram Turnpike Trust	1818	58 Geo. 3. c. vi	Manchester and Hyde Turnpike Road Act 1818; An Act for making and maintaining a Turnpike Road from near the Town of Manchester in the County of Lancaster to Hyde Lane Bridge in the County of Chester.
Lawton and Cranage Turnpike Trust	1730	4 Geo. 2. c. 3	Cheshire Roads Act 1730; An Act for repairing the Roads leading from the most Southern Part of Butt Lane, in the Parish of Lawton, in the County Palatine of Chester, to Lawton; and from thence to Henshal's Smithy, upon Cranage Green, in the said County.
Macclesfield and Buxton Turnpike Trust	1758	32 Geo. 2. c. 41	Macclesfield and Buxton Road Act 1758; An Act for repairing and widening the Road from the Cross at Broken Cross in Macclesfield in the County of Chester, through Macclesfield Forest, to the present Turnpike Road at the South End of the Township of Buxton in the County of Derby.
Macclesfield and Congleton Turnpike Trust	1796	36 Geo. 3. c. 148	Macclesfield and Congleton Road Act 1796; An act for altering, widening, improving, and keeping in repair, the road leading from Macclesfield, by Broken Cross, to Congleton, all in the county palatine of Chester.
Macclesfield and Nether Tabley Turnpike Trust	1769	9 Geo. 3. c. 65	Macclesfield and Nether Tabley Road Act 1769; An Act to repair and widen the Road from the Broken Cross in Macclesfield, in the County of Chester, over the Long Mots and Monks Heath to the Turnpike Road in Nether Tabley, in the said County; and for turning and exchanging Part of the said Road.
Macclesfield District of Sandon Turnpike Trust	1762	2 Geo. 3. c. 42	Stafford and Chester Roads Act 1762; An Act for repairing, widening, and altering, the Road from Sandon in the County of Stafford, to Bullock Smithy in the County of Chester; and from Hilderstone to Draycott in the Moors, and from Wetley Rocks to Tean in the said County of Stafford.
Manchester and Buxton Turnpike Trust	1758	32 Geo. 2. c. 41	Macclesfield and Buxton Road Act 1758; An Act for repairing and widening the Road from the Cross at Broken Cross in Macclesfield in the County of Chester, through Macclesfield Forest, to the present Turnpike Road at the South End of the Township of Buxton in the County of Derby.
Nantwich and Congleton Turnpike Trust	1835	5 & 6 Will. 4. c. xxxvii	Sandbach and Congleton Turnpike Road (Cheshire) Act 1835; An Act for making and maintaining a Road from Sandbach to Congleton in the County Palatine of Chester, and a Branch Road communicating therewith.
Nantwich and Middlewich Turnpike Trust	1835	5 & 6 Will. 4. c. xxxvii	Sandbach and Congleton Turnpike Road (Cheshire) Act 1835; An Act for making and maintaining a Road from Sandbach to Congleton in the County Palatine of Chester, and a Branch Road communicating therewith.
Nantwich and Weelock Road Turnpike Trust	1816	56 Geo. 3. c. xv	Nantwich to Wheelock Wharf Turnpike Road Act 1816; An Act for making and maintaining a Turnpike Road from the Town of Nantwicb, to Wheelock Wharf, in the Township of Sandbach, in the County Palatine of Chester.
Nantwich and Woore Turnpike Trust	1743	17 Geo. 2. c. 24	Litchfield Roads Act 1743; An Act for more effectually repairing the Roads from Coleshill, in the County of Warwick, through the City of Litchfield, to Stone, in the County of Stafford, and from thence to the City of Chester; and for amending other Roads therein mentioned.
Newcastle under Lyme and Nantwich Turnpike Trust	1766	6 Geo. 3. c. 89	Stafford and Chester Roads Act 1766; An Act for repairing and widening the Road leading from the Bottom of Church Lane in the Town of Newcastle under Lane in the County of Stafford, to the Turnpike Road leading from Woor to Chester near the Town of Nantwich in the County of Chester, and from Chesterton through Alderley and Balterly to Ghorsly Hill.
Northwich and Kensall Turnpike Trust	1769	9 Geo. 3. c. 94	Stafford and Chester Roads Act 1769; An Act for repealing so much of Two several Acts of Parliament, made and passed in the Seventeenth and Twenty-eighth Years of the Reign of His late Majesty King George the Second, as relate to the Road from the End of the County of Stafford, in the Post Road, towards the City of Chester, through Woor in the County of Salop, to Nantwich in the County of Chester, and from Nantwich to Tarporley, and from thence, through Tarvin in the said County of Chester, to the said City of Chester; and for more effectually repairing, widening, and supporting the same Road; and also for repairing and widening the Road from Northwich, in the said County of Chester, to the Cross in Tarvin aforesaid.
Runcorn and Northwich Turnpike Trust	1819	59 Geo. 3. c. lxxxv	Runcorn and Northwich Turnpike Road Act 1819; An Act for making and maintaining a Turnpike Road from Runcorn to Northwich, in the County Palatine of Chester.
Sandbach and Congleton Turnpike Trust	1835	5 & 6 Will. 4. c. xxxvii	Sandbach and Congleton Turnpike Road (Cheshire) Act 1835; An Act for making and maintaining a Road from Sandbach to Congleton in the County Palatine of Chester, and a Branch Road communicating therewith.
Spann Smithy, Booth Lane and Winsford Turnpike Trust	1753	26 Geo. 2. c. 84	Span Smithy, Winsford Bridge and Northwich Roads Act 1753; An Act for repairing and widening the Roads from Spann Smithy in the Township of Elton, through the Town of Middlewich, and by Spittle Hill in Stanthorne to Winsford Bridge, and from Spittle Hill to the Town of Northwich, in the County Palatine of Chester.
Spann Smithy, Linley Lane Turnpike Trust	1788	28 Geo. 3. c. 104	Chester and Stafford Roads Act 1788; An Act for amending, widening, and keeping in Repair the Road from Spann Smithy in the County of Chester, to Talk in the County of Stafford.
Stayley Turnpike Trust	1793	33 Geo. 3. c. 140	Yorkshire Derby and Chester Roads Act 1793; An Act for making and maintaining a Road from or nearly from French Top, in the Parish of Saddleworth, in the West Riding of the County of York, to Brookhouses in the Parish of Glossop, in the County of Derby, and for repairing and altering the Road leading from or nearly from a Close called Copley Meadow in Stayley, to or near to Stayley Bridge, in the County of Chester.
Stockport and Ashton Turnpike Trust	1765	5 Geo. 3. c. 100	Chester, Lancaster and Yorks Roads Act 1765; An Act for repairing and widening the Road from Stockport in the County of Chester, to Saxon's Lane End in the County of Lancaster; and from the Cross in Ashton under Line in the said County of Lancaster to Doctor's Lane Head, in the County of York; and also the Road branching out of the said first mentioned Road in the Township of Bredbury to Mottram, in the said County of Chester.
Stockport and Warrington Turnpike Trust	1820	1 Geo. 4. c. xxviii	Stockport and Warrington Road Act 1820; An Act for making and maintaining a Turnpike Road from or nearly from the Town of Stockport, in the County Palatine of Chester, to or near unto the Town of Warrington, in the County Palatine of Lancaster, and a Branch of Road to communicate therewith.
Stockport to Marple Bridge Turnpike Trust	1801	41 Geo. 3. (U.K.) c. xcviii	Stockport and Marple Bridge Road Act 1801; An Act for making, widening, and repairing the Road from the Old Bridge, in the Town of Stockport, in the County of Chester, through the several Townships of Stockport, Offerton, and Marple, to or near Marple Bridge, all in the said County, and a Branch from the said Road in the Township of Marple aforesaid, through the Village of New Mills, to or near Thornset Gate, both in the County of Derby, and another Branch from or near Thornset Gate aforesaid, through the Village of New Mills aforesaid, to or near the present Road, in the Township of Disley, in the said County of Chester.
Tarporley and Whitchurch Turnpike Trust	1829	10 Geo. 4. c. lxxvii	Tarporley and Whitchurch Turnpike Road (Cheshire, Salop.) Act 1829; An Act for making and maintaining a Turnpike Road between the Town of Tarporley in the County Palatine of Chester and the Town of Whitchurch in the County of Salop.
Tarporley to Acton Forge Turnpike Trust	1782	22 Geo. 3. c. 106	Tarporley to Weverham Road Act 1782; An Act for repairing and widening the Road from Tarporley, in the County Palatine of Chester, to Acton Bridge, near Weverham, in the same County.
Thornset Turnpike Trust	1831	1 & 2 Will. 4. c. xvii	Thornset and Disley Road (Derbyshire, Cheshire) Act 1831; An Act for making and maintaining a Road from Thornset in the County of Derby to Furnace Colliery within Disley in the County of Chester, and Two several Branches therefrom.
Washway (Crossford Bridge to Altringham) Turnpike Trust	1796	36 Geo. 3. c. 143	Crossford Bridge and Altrincham Road Act 1796; An act for repairing and amending the road leading from Crossford Bridge within Stretford, in the county palatine of Lancaster, to Altrincham in the county palatine of Chester.
Wilmslow Turnpike Trust; Manchester and Wilmslow Turnpike Trust	1793	33 Geo. 3. c. 170	Manchester to Wilmslow Road Act 1793; An Act for repairing, widening, altering, diverting, and turning the Road from Ardwick Green, near Manchester, in the County of Lancaster, to the New Bridge at the Corn Mills at Wilmslow, in the County of Chester.
Wilmslow to Church Lawton Turnpike Trust	1781	21 Geo. 3. c. 82	Cheshire Roads Act 1781; An Act for repairing and widening the Road from Wilmslow Bridge, in Wilmslow, in the County of Chester, through Nether Alderley and the Town of Congleton, to or near the Red Bull, in Church Lawton, in the said County.
Wrexham to Barnhill Turnpike Trust			

== Cumberland ==
Trust	Founded	Initial act	
Trust	Founded	Citation	Title
Alston Turnpike Trust; Burtryford Road (Alston New Road) Turnpike Trust	1778	18 Geo. 3. c. 116	Hexham to Alston Road Act 1778; An Act for altering, repairing and widening, the Road from Summer Rods Bar, near the Town of Hexham, in the County of Northumberland, to the Town of Alston, in the County of Cumberland.
Brampton and Longtown Turnpike Trust	1807	47 Geo. 3 Sess. 2. c. xv	Road from Brampton to Longtown (Cumberland) Act 1807; An Act for amending and keeping in Repair the Road from Brampton to Longtown, in the County of Cumberland, and for erecting a Bridge over the River Line upon the said Road.
Brougham Bridge Turnpike Trust	1812	52 Geo. 3. c. cxxii	Brougham and Penrith Road Act 1812; An Act for amending and keeping in Repair the Road from Brampton to Longtown, in the County of Cumberland, and for erecting a Bridge over the River Line upon the said Road.
Carlisle and Brampton Turnpike Trust	1828	9 Geo. 4. c. xx	Road from Carlisle to Brampton Act 1828; An Act for making and maintaining a Turnpike Road from the City of Carlisle in the County of Cumberland, by way of Warwick Bridge, to the Market Town of Brampton in the said County.
Carlisle and Eamont Bridge Turnpike Trust	1753	26 Geo. 2. c. 40	Carlisle and Eamont Bridge Road Act 1753; An Act for repairing the Roads from the City of Carlisle to the Town of Penrith, in the County of Cumberland, and from the said Town of Penrith to Emont Bridge, which divides the Counties of Cumberland and Westmorland.
Carlisle and Temon (Military Road) Turnpike Trust	1750	24 Geo. 2. c. 25	Carlisle and Newcastle Road Act 1750; An Act for laying out, making, and keeping in Repair, a Road proper for the Passage of Troops and Carriages, from the City of Carlisle, to the Town of Newcastle upon Tyne.
Carlisle to Skillbeck Turnpike Trust	1767	7 Geo. 3. c. 83	Cumberland Roads Act 1766; An Act for repairing and widening the Road from Shaddon Gate near Carlisle to the present Turnpike Road between Binsey Mires and North Raw Gate, to join the Turnpike Road at Skillbeck in the County of Cumberland.
Cockermouth and Carlisle Turnpike Trust	1824	5 Geo. 4. c. vii	Carlisle and Cockermouth Roads Act 1824; An Act for more effectually amending, improving and keeping in Repair the Roads from the City of Carlisle to the Market Town of Cockermouth in the County of Cumberland.
Cockermouth and Maryport Turnpike Trust	1825	6 Geo. 4. c. lxxxv	Road from Cockermouth to Maryport Act 1825; An Act for more effectually amending, improving and keeping in Repair the Road from the Town of Cockermouth to the Town of Maryport, and from thence by Allonby to Wigton, and several other Roads therein mentioned, all in the County of Cumberland.
Cockermouth and Workington Turnpike Trust	1753	26 Geo. 2. c. 49	Cockermouth and Workington Road Act 1753; An Act for repairing the Road from the City of Carlisle, in the County of Cumberland, to the Market and Sea Port Town of Workington, in the said County.
Egremont to Salthouse Turnpike Trust	1749	23 Geo. 2. c. 40	Cumberland Roads Act 1749; An Act for repairing and widening the Roads leading from Egremont to Dudden Bridge, Santon Bridge, and Salthouse, in the County of Cumberland.
Keswick Turnpike Trust			
Kingstown and Westlinton Bridge Turnpike Trust; Carlisle to Westleton Turnpike Trust	1806	46 Geo. 3. c. liii	Road from Carlisle to Westlinton Bridge Act 1806; An Act for amending and keeping in Repair, the Road leading from the Guide Post at the Top of Stanwix Bank, near the City of Carlisle, to Westlington Bridge, in the County of Cumberland.
Longtown, Snab and Haithwaite Bridge Turnpike Trust; Longtown Turnpike Trust	1794	34 Geo. 3. c. 143	Cumberland Roads Act 1794; An act for amending, and keeping in repair, the road leading from Lyne Bridge, through Longtown, to the Scotch Dyke, and from Longtown to the bridge over the river of Sark, in the county of Cumberland.
Penrith to Chalk Beck Turnpike Trust	1753	26 Geo. 2. c. 37	Cumberland Roads Act 1753; An Act for repairing the Road leading from the Town of Penrith, in the County of Cumberland, by Hutton Hall, over Skelton and Castlesowerby Pastures and Sebraham Bridge, to Chalk Beck, in the said County; and also the Road which branches and separates from the same Road upon Castlesowerby Pasture aforesaid, and leads from thence through Hesket, otherwise Hesket-New-Market, to Caldbeck, in the said County.
Whitehaven Turnpike Trust	1739	13 Geo. 2. c. 14	Whitehaven Harbour Improvement Act 1739; An Act for making more effectual Two Acts of Parliament, passed in the Seventh and Tenth Years of Her late Majesty Queen Anne, for preserving and enlarging the Harbour of Whitehaven, in the County of Cumberland; and for repairing and amending the High Roads leading to the said Harbour and Town of Whitehaven.

== Lancashire ==
Trust	Founded	Initial act	
Trust	Founded	Citation	Title
Addington and Westhoughton Turnpike Trust	1817	57 Geo. 3. c. x	West Houghton and Duxbury Stocks Road Act 1817; An Act for more effectually repairing and improving the Road from West Houghton to Duxbury Stocks, in the County of Lancaster.
Agecroft District Turnpike Trust	1784	24 Geo. 3. Sess. 2. c. 68	Lancashire Roads Act 1784; An Act for repealing an Act made in the Twenty-sixth Year of the Reign of King George the Second, for repairing and widening certain Roads leading to and from the Towns of Salford, Warrington, Bolton, and Wigan, and to certain Places called the Broad Oak in Worsley and Duxbury Stocks, in the County Palatine of Lancaster, for making more effectual Provision for repairing and widening the said Roads, and also for making, altering, and widening the Road from a Place called South Sea in Pendlebury to Agecrost Bridge, and from thence through Hilton Lane to Dawson Lane End, and also from Agecrost Bridge over Kersal Moor to Singleton Brook, in the said County.
Ashton and Platt Bridge Turnpike Trust	1800	39 & 40 Geo. 3. c. lxxiii	Ince and Ashton in Mackerfield Road Act 1800; An Act for amending, widening, improving, and keeping in Repair, the Road leading out of the Common Highway from Wigan to Golborn and Warrington, near the Northerly End of the Southerly Platt Bridge in Ince in Mackerfield, by Ramferlong, into the Turnpike Road from Wigan to Ashton, in Ashton in Mackerfield, in the County Palatine of Lancaster.
Balderston and Burscough Bridge Turnpike Trust	1814	54 Geo. 3. c. liv	Balderston and Walton-in-le-Dale Road Act 1814; An Act for making and maintaining a Road from Balderston to Burscough Bridge in Walton in le Dale, in the County Palatine of Lancaster.
Barton Bridge and Moses Gate Turnpike Trust; Eccles to Farnworth Turnpike Trust; Worsley Turnpike Trust	1804	44 Geo. 3. c. xxvi	Barton Bridge and Farnworth Road Act 1804; An Act for amending, widening, improving and keeping in repair, the road leading from Barton Bridge, in the parish of Eccles, into and through the township of Worsley, to a place called Moses Gate, in the township of Farnworth, all in the county palatine of Lancaster.
Barton Bridge and Stretford Turnpike Trust	1811	51 Geo. 3. c. xxxi	Barton Bridge and Stretford Road Act 1811; An Act for amending the Road from Barton Bridge into the Manchester and Altrincham Turnpike Road; and also a Branch therefrom, into the said Turnpike Road; all in the County of Lancaster.
Blackburn and Preston Turnpike Trust	1824	5 Geo. 4. c. lv	Blackburn and Preston Road and Ribble Bridge Act 1824; An Act for making and maintaining a Road from Blackburn to Preston, and Two Branches therefrom, and erecting a Bridge on the Line of the said Road over the River Ribble, all in the County Palatine of Lancaster.
Blackburn to Addingham and Cocking End Turnpike Trust	1755	28 Geo. 2. c. 59	Yorkshire and Lancaster Roads Act 1755; Act for repairing, widening, and amending, the Road from Cocking End near Addingham in the West Riding of the County of York, through Kildwick, to Black Lane End in the County Palatine of Lancaster.
Blackburn to Walton Cop Turnpike Trust	1755	28 Geo. 2. c. 59	Yorkshire and Lancaster Roads Act 1755; Act for repairing, widening, and amending, the Road from Cocking End near Addingham in the West Riding of the County of York, through Kildwick, to Black Lane End in the County Palatine of Lancaster.
Bolee Turnpike Trust; Rochdale Lane End to Land's End in Heaton Turnpike Trust; Heywood to Heaton Turnpike Trust	1789	29 Geo. 3. c. 110	Heywood and Prestwich Road Act 1789; An Act for repairing and widening the Road from Rochdale Lane End, in the Village of Heywood, in the Parish of Bury, to a Place called The Land's End, in the Parish of Prestwich, in the County Palatine of Lancaster.
Bolton and Blackburn Turnpike Trust	1797	37 Geo. 3. c. 173	Bolton Blackburn and Twisey Roads Act 1797; An Act for amending, widening, altering, and keeping in repair, the road from Bolton in the Moors, to Blackburn, in the county palatine of Lancaster.
Bolton and Nightingale Turnpike Trust; Heath Charnock to Bolton Turnpike Trust	1763	3 Geo. 3. c. 31	Bolton and Nightingale's Road Act 1763; An Act for repairing and widening the Road from a Place called Nightingales in the Township of Heath Charnock, to the Bridge at the West End of the Town of Bolton in the Moors, in the County Palatine of Lancaster.
Bolton and St Helens Turnpike Trust; Bolton to Leigh Turnpike Trust	1762	2 Geo. 3. c. 44	Lancaster Roads Act 1762; An Act for repairing and widening the Roads from a certain Place near Bolton in the Moors to Leigh, and thence to the Guide Post near Golbourne Dale, and to the South End of Newton Bridge, and from the said Guide Post to Winwick; and from Newton, by Parr Stocks, to the Guide Post in Parr, in the County Palatine of Lancaster.
Bolton and Westhoughton Turnpike Trust	1800	39 & 40 Geo. 3. c. lxxiv	Great Bolton and Westhoughton Chapel Road Act 1800; An Act for amending, widening, improving, and keeping in Repair, the Road leading from the South End of the Moor Lane, in the Township of Great Bolton, into the Turnpike Road from Manchester to Wigan, near Westhoughton Chapel, in the County Palatine of Lancaster.
Bolton to Haslingdon Turnpike Trust	1825	6 Geo. 4. c. xcii	Bolton-le-Moors and Haslingden Road and Branches Act 1825; An Act for making and maintaining a Road from Bradshaw Brow, near the Town of Bolton-le-Moors, in the County of Lancaster, to the Bury and Blackburn Turnpike Road, in the Township of Haslingden, in the same County, and Three Branches of Road communicating therewith.
Burnley to Edenfield Chapel Turnpike Trust; Burnley to Tottington Turnpike Trust	1795	35 Geo. 3. c. 146	Burnley Roads Act 1795; An Act for amending, improving, and keeping in repair, the road from the town of Burnley, in the county palatine of Lancaster, to the turnpike road leading from Bury to Haslingden, at or near Edenfield Chapel, in the township of Tottington Higher End, in the same county.
Bury and Bolton Turnpike Trust	1821	1 & 2 Geo. 4. c. xc	Road from Bury to Little Bolton Act 1821; An Act for making a Road from Bury, in the County Palatine of Lancaster, to or near a certain House, known by the Sign of The Bull and Wharf, in the Township of Little Bolton, in the said County.
Bury to Blackburn, Whalley etc. Turnpike Trust	1789	29 Geo. 3. c. 107	Lancaster Roads Act 1789; An Act for amending, widening, turning, varying, altering, and keeping in Repair, the Road from a certain Dwelling House in Bury, now or late in the Occupation of William Walker, Gentleman, to Hastingden, and from thence to the East End of Salford Bridge, in Blackburn, and also the Road from Haslingden aforesaid, to the East End of Cockshut Bridge, in the Town of Whalley, and also the Road from Haslingden aforesaid, through New Church and Bacup to Todmorden, and for making a Road from the said Road between Bury and Haslingden, in the Township of Walmersley, to the River Irwell, and for building a Bridge over the said River, all in the County Palatine of Lancaster.
Clitheroe to Blackburn and Mellor Brook Turnpike Trust	1755	28 Geo. 2. c. 60	Leeds to Otley Road Act 1755; An Act for repairing and widening the Roads from the Town of Leeds in the West Riding of the County of York, through Otley, Skipton, Colne, Burnley, and Blackburn, to Burscough Bridge in Walton in the County of Lancaster, and from Skipton, through Gisburn and Clitheroe, to Preston in the said County of Lancaster.
Dryclough, Shaw and Rochdale Turnpike Trust	1805	45 Geo. 3. c. vii	Road from Hollinwood to Featherstall Act 1805; An Act for making and maintaining a Road from Hollinwood, in the Township of Chadderton, to Featherstall, in the Township of Hundersfield, in the County Palatine of Lancaster, and for making and maintaining several Branches of Road to communicate therewith.
Edenfield Chapel and Bury Bridge Turnpike Trust; Edenfield Chapel to Little Bolton Turnpike Trust	1797	37 Geo. 3. c. 174	Bury and Bolton Roads Act 1797; An Act for amending, widening, altering, and keeping in repair, the road from or near Edenfield Chapel, in the township of Tottington Higher End, in the parish of Bury, to the township of Little Bolton, in the parish of Bolton in le Moors; and also for making and maintaining a road, from the said road, at or near a place called Booth Pitts, in the township of Tottington Lower End, to or near Bury Bridge, in the township of Elton, in the said parish of Bury, all in the county palatine of Lancaster.
Elton and Blackburn Turnpike Trust	1810	50 Geo. 3. c. cxxxvii	Road from Elton to Blackburn Act 1810; An Act for making and maintaining a Road from Brandlesome Moss Gate, in the Township of Elton, to the Duke of York's Publick House, in the Township of Blackburn, and Three several Branches of Road therefrom, all in the County Palatine of Lancaster.
Garstang and Herring-syke Turnpike Trust; Garstang and Heronsyke Turnpike Trust	1750	24 Geo. 2. c. 20	Preston and Lancaster Road Act 1750; An Act for repairing and widening the Road from Preston to Lancaster, and from thence to a Place called Heiring Syke, that divides the Counties of Lancaster and Preston.
Gilda Brook and Irlam Turnpike Trust	1793	33 Geo. 3. c. 181	Lancaster Roads Act 1793; An Act for more effectually repairing, widening, and improving certain Roads leading to and from the Towns of Salford, Warrington, Bolton, and Wigan, and to certain Places called the Broad Oak, in Worsley, and Duxbury Stocks, and also the Road from a Place called South Sea, in Pendlebury, to Agecroft Bridge, and from thence, through Hilton-Lane, to Dawson Lane End; and also from Agecroft Bridge, over Kersal Moor, to Singleton Brook, all in the County Palatine of Lancaster.
Gisburne and Long Preston Turnpike Trust	1803	43 Geo. 3. c. lxix	Road from Marsden to Gisburne (Lancashire, Yorkshire) Act 1803; An Act for amending, altering, and keeping in Repair the Road from the Turnpike Road between Burnley and Colne, in the Township of Marsden, in the Parish of Whalley, in the County Palatine of Lancaster, to the Town of Gisburn, in the West Riding of the County of York, and from thence to the Turnpike Road leading from Skipton to Settle, at or near the Town or Village of Long Preston, in the said County of York.
Haslingden and Todmorden Turnpike Trust	1789	29 Geo. 3. c. 107	Lancaster Roads Act 1789; An Act for amending, widening, turning, varying, altering, and keeping in Repair, the Road from a certain Dwelling House in Bury, now or late in the Occupation of William Walker, Gentleman, to Hastingden, and from thence to the East End of Salford Bridge, in Blackburn, and also the Road from Haslingden aforesaid, to the East End of Cockshut Bridge, in the Town of Whalley, and also the Road from Haslingden aforesaid, through New Church and Bacup to Todmorden, and for making a Road from the said Road between Bury and Haslingden, in the Township of Walmersley, to the River Irwell, and for building a Bridge over the said River, all in the County Palatine of Lancaster.
Hulme and Eccles Turnpike Trust	1806	46 Geo. 3. c. ii	Road from Manchester through Salford to Eccles Act 1806; An Act for making and maintaining a Road from Great Bridgewater Street, in Manchester, across the River Irwell, through Salford to Eccles, in the County Palatine of Lancaster, and several Branches of Road to communicate therewith.
Hulme and Stretford Turnpike Trust	1750	24 Geo. 2. c. 13	Crossford Bridge and Manchester Road Act 1750; An Act for repairing the Road from Crosford Bridge, through the Townships of Stretford and Hulme, to the Town of Manchester, in the County Palatine of Lancaster.
Hulton Turnpike Trust	1753	26 Geo. 2. c. 63	Lancashire Roads Act 1753; An Act for repairing and widening the Roads from a certain Place in the Town of Salford, to the Towns of Warrington and Bolton, and through Wardley Lane to the Town of Wigan, and to the Stocks in the Township of Duxbury, and to a Place called The Broad Oak in Worseley, in the County Palatine of Lancaster.
Ince, Hindley and Westhoughton Turnpike Trust	1753	26 Geo. 2. c. 63	Lancashire Roads Act 1753; An Act for repairing and widening the Roads from a certain Place in the Town of Salford, to the Towns of Warrington and Bolton, and through Wardley Lane to the Town of Wigan, and to the Stocks in the Township of Duxbury, and to a Place called The Broad Oak in Worseley, in the County Palatine of Lancaster.
Irlam Turnpike Trust; Irlam's-o'-th'-Height Turnpike Trust	1753	26 Geo. 2. c. 63	Lancashire Roads Act 1753; An Act for repairing and widening the Roads from a certain Place in the Town of Salford, to the Towns of Warrington and Bolton, and through Wardley Lane to the Town of Wigan, and to the Stocks in the Township of Duxbury, and to a Place called The Broad Oak in Worseley, in the County Palatine of Lancaster.
Kirby Kendall and Kirby Ireleth Turnpike Trust	1763	3 Geo. 3. c. 33	Kirby Kendal and Kirby Ireleth Road Act 1763; An Act for repairing, widening, and keeping in Repair, the Road from Kirkby Kendall in the County of Westmorland, to Kirkby Ireleth in the County of Lancaster.
Liverpool and Preston Turnpike Trust	1771	11 Geo. 3. c. 93	Liverpool and Preston Road Act 1771; An Act for repairing and widening the Road from Patrick's Cross, within the Town of Liverpoole, in the County Palatine of Lancaster, to the Town of Preston, in the same County Palatine.
Liverpool, Prescot, Ashton and Warrington Turnpike Trust	1725	12 Geo. 1. c. 21	Liverpool to Prescot Road Act 1725; An Act for repairing and enlarging the Road from Liverpool to Prescot, and other Roads therein mentioned, in the County Palatine of Lancaster.
Livesey Branch Turnpike Trust	1830	11 Geo. 4 & 1 Will. 4. c. xxx	Road from Bolton-le-Moors to Blackburn Act 1830; An Act for more effectually repairing and improving the Road from Bolton-le-Moors to Blackburn, in the County Palatine of Lancaster, with two Branches of Road therefrom, and for making and maintaining a Branch of Road to or near the Village of Lower Darwen.
Manchester and Ashton under Lyne Turnpike Trust	1825	6 Geo. 4. c. li	Manchester and Ashton-under-Lyne Road Act 1825; An Act for making and maintaining a Road from Great Ancoats Street, in the Town of Manchester, in the County of Lancaster, to join a Diversion of the Manchester and Saltersbrook Road in Andershaw, in the Parish of Ashton under Line, in the said County, and Two Branches of Road communicating therewith.
Manchester and Bury Turnpike Trust; Manchester and Bury New Road Turnpike Trust; Manchester to Pilkington Turnpike Trust	1826	7 Geo. 4. c. lxxxi	Manchester and Bury Turnpike Road Act 1826; An Act for making and maintaining a Road from the Top of Hunt's Bank in the Town of Manchester in the County of Lancaster, to join the present Manchester and Bury Turnpike Road in Pilkington in the said County.
Manchester and Oldham and Austerlands Turnpike Trust	1734	8 Geo. 2. c. 3	Yorkshire and Lancashire Roads Act 1734; An Act for repairing the Roads from the Town of Manchester, leading through Newton, Failsworth, and Oldham, in the County Palatine of Lancaster, to Austerlands, in the Parish of Saddleworth, in the County of York.
Manchester to Bolton Turnpike Trust	1821	1 & 2 Geo. 4. c. lxxx	Moses Gate District of Road (Lancashire) Act 1821; An Act for repealing an Act of His late Majesty's Reign, for improving the Road from Manchester to Bolton, and other Places therein mentioned in the County of Lancaster, so far as relates to the Moses Gate District of Road therein mentioned; and for granting further and more effectual Powers instead thereof; and for repairing and improving the said District of Roads; and making a new Branch of Road to communicate with the said District of Road.
Manchester to Newton Chapel Turnpike Trust	1817	57 Geo. 3. c. xlvii	Manchester to Newton Road Act 1817; An Act for making and keeping in Repair a Carriage Road from the Township of Manchester to Newton Chapel in the Township of Newton, with a Branch to the River Medlock in the Township of Droylsden, in the County Palatine of Lancaster.
Manchester to Rochdale, Bury etc. Turnpike Trust	1755	28 Geo. 2. c. 58	Lancashire Roads Act 1755; An Act for repairing and widening the Roads from the Town of Manchester, by a Place called The White Smithy, in the Township of Crumpsal, to the Town of Rochdale, and from the said Place called The White Smithy, by a Place called Besses of the Barn, to the Town of Bury; and from the said Place called Besses of the Barn to Radcliffe Bridge, in the County Palatine of Lancaster.
Manchester to Saltersbrook Turnpike Trust	1731	5 Geo. 2. c. 10	Manchester Roads Act 1731; An Act for repairing and amending the Road leading from the Town of Manchester, in the County Palatine of Lancaster, through the Town of Ashton under Line, and the Parish of Mottram Longdendale; and from thence to Salter's Brook, in the County Palatine of Chester.
Manchester, Denton, Stockport Turnpike Trust			
Matherfold and Hardman's Turnpike Trust	1810	50 Geo. 3. c. c	Road from Bolton-Le-Moors to Blackburn Act 1810; An Act to continue the Term, and alter and enlarge the Powers of an Act of the Thirty seventh Year of His present Majesty, for amending the Road from Bolton in the Moors to Blackburn, in the County Palatine of Lancaster; and for making a Branch of Road from the said Road to the Road leading from Blackburn to Preston and another Branch of Road from Mather Fold to Hardman's, both in Turton in the said County.
Oldham and Ripponden Turnpike Trust	1795	35 Geo. 3. c. 137	Oldham and Saddleworth Roads Act 1795; An Act for making and maintaining a turnpike road from Mumps Brook, within Oldham, in the county palatine of Lancaster, to Ripponden, in the west riding of the county of York; and a branch therefrom, at or near Denshaw, to or near to Brownhill, and another branch therefrom, at or near Grains, to Delphi within Saddleworth, in the said riding.
Pendleton District Turnpike Trust	1753	26 Geo. 2. c. 63	Lancashire Roads Act 1753; An Act for repairing and widening the Roads from a certain Place in the Town of Salford, to the Towns of Warrington and Bolton, and through Wardley Lane to the Town of Wigan, and to the Stocks in the Township of Duxbury, and to a Place called The Broad Oak in Worseley, in the County Palatine of Lancaster.
Penwortham and Wrightington Turnpike Trust	1825	6 Geo. 4. c. ii	Penwortham Bridge Road (Lancashire) Act 1825; An Act for repairing and maintaining the Road from Penwortham Bridge to the Boundary between the Townships of Wrightington and Shevington, and the Road from Lydiate Lane End to a Bridge called Little Hanging Bridge, all in the County of Lancaster.
Preston and Garstang Turnpike Trust	1750	24 Geo. 2. c. 20	Preston and Lancaster Road Act 1750; An Act for repairing and widening the Road from Preston to Lancaster, and from thence to a Place called Heiring Syke, that divides the Counties of Lancaster and Preston.
Prestwick and Bury Turnpike Trust	1832	2 & 3 Will. 4. c . xcix	Road from Prestwich to Bury and Ratcliffe Act 1832; An Act for repairing and improving the Roads from Prestwich to Bury and Ratcliffe in the County Palatine of Lancaster.
Richmond and Lancaster Turnpike Trust	1751	24 Geo. 2. c. 17	Richmond and Lancaster Road Act 1750; An Act for repairing the Road leading from the East End of Brumpton High Lane, in the County of York, to the Town of Richmond, and from thence, to and through the Towns of Askrigg and Ingleton, in the said County, to the Town of Lancaster, in the County of Lancaster.
Ridghill and Lanes and Holehouse Turnpike Trust; Ashton under Lyne to Saddleworth Turnpike Trust	1826	7 Geo. 4. c. xxi	Ridgehill and Lanes and Holehouse Road (Lancashire, Yorkshire) Act 1826; An Act for making and maintaining a Road from Ridghill and Lanes, in the Parish of Ashton under Lyne in the County Palatine of Lancaster, to or near to Holehouse in Saddleworth in the West Riding of the County of York.
Rochdale and Burnley Turnpike Trust	1755	28 Geo. 2. c. 53	Rochdale to Burnley Road Act 1755; An Act for repairing and widening the Road from Rochdale to Burnley, in the County of Lancaster.
Rochdale and Edenfield Turnpike Trust	1794	34 Geo. 3. c. 124	Rochdale to Bury Road Act 1794; An act for amending, widening, altering, diverting, and improving, the road leading from the town of Rochdale, to a place called Edenfield, in the parish of Bury, all in the county palatine of Lancaster.
Rochdale and Manchester Turnpike Trust	1755	28 Geo. 2. c. 58	Lancashire Roads Act 1755; An Act for repairing and widening the Roads from the Town of Manchester, by a Place called The White Smithy, in the Township of Crumpsal, to the Town of Rochdale, and from the said Place called The White Smithy, by a Place called Besses of the Barn, to the Town of Bury; and from the said Place called Besses of the Barn to Radcliffe Bridge, in the County Palatine of Lancaster.
Rochdale, Bamford and Bury Turnpike Trust	1797	37 Geo. 3. c. 145	Rochdale and Bury Road Act 1797; An Act for amending, widening, altering, improving, and keeping in repair, the road from Rochdale through Bamford and Birtle to Bury, and for making and maintaining three several branches of road therefrom, all in the county palatine of Lancaster.
Salford to Wigan Turnpike Trust	1753	26 Geo. 2. c. 63	Lancashire Roads Act 1753; An Act for repairing and widening the Roads from a certain Place in the Town of Salford, to the Towns of Warrington and Bolton, and through Wardley Lane to the Town of Wigan, and to the Stocks in the Township of Duxbury, and to a Place called The Broad Oak in Worseley, in the County Palatine of Lancaster.
Sharples and Houghton Turnpike Trust	1801	41 Geo. 3. (U.K.) c. cxxiii	Bolton and Leyland Road Act 1801; An act for making and maintaining a road from the turnpike road leading from Bolton to Blackburn, at or near to the Lamb Inn, otherwise Fletcher's publick house, in the township of Sharples, in the parish of Bolton-in-the-Moors, to the turnpike road leading from Preston to Blackburn aforesaid, at or near to Brindle Lane end, otherwise Foole Lane end, in the township of Hoghton, in the parish of Leyland, all in the county palatine of Lancaster.
Standedge and Oldham Turnpike Trust; Saddleworth to Oldham Turnpike Trust	1792	32 Geo. 3. c. 139	Lancaster Roads Act 1792; An Act for making and maintaining a Road from or nearly from Stand Ege, within Saddleworth, in the West Riding of the County of York, to or near Mump's Brook, in the Township of Oldham, in the Parish of Prestwich, in the County Palatine of Lancaster, and also a Road leading out of the said intended Road through or near Dobcross, to or near a Place called Wall Hill in Saddleworth aforesaid; and also another Road leading out of the said first-mentioned Road at or near a Place called Shaw Hall, to or near a Place called Hollins, all in Saddleworth aforesaid.
Stretford to Manchester Turnpike Trust	1751	24 Geo. 2. c. 13	Crossford Bridge and Manchester Road Act 1750; An Act for repairing the Road from Crosford Bridge, through the Townships of Stretford and Hulme, to the Town of Manchester, in the County Palatine of Lancaster.
Sudden Bridge to Bury Turnpike Trust	1797	37 Geo. 3. c. 146	Rochdale and Bury and Sudden Roads Act 1797; An act for amending, widening, turning, altering, improving, and keeping in repair, the road from or near the guide post, at or near a certain place, called Sudden Bridge, in the township of Castleton, within the parish of Rochdale, in the county palatine of Lancaster, to the northeasterly end of a certain street or place, in the town of Bury, within the parish of Bury, in the said county, called Clerk Street; and for making a new road from and out of the said road, at or near a place called Captain Fold, in the township of Castleton aforesaid, to communicate as well with the turnpike road leading from the town of Rochdale to the town of Manchester, in the said county, as also with the Rochdale canal, at or near a place called The Blue Pitts, in the said township of Castleton.
Swinton District Turnpike Trust	1753	26 Geo. 2. c. 63	Lancashire Roads Act 1753; An Act for repairing and widening the Roads from a certain Place in the Town of Salford, to the Towns of Warrington and Bolton, and through Wardley Lane to the Town of Wigan, and to the Stocks in the Township of Duxbury, and to a Place called The Broad Oak in Worseley, in the County Palatine of Lancaster.
Ulverston and Carnforth Turnpike Trust	1818	58 Geo. 3. c. lxx	Ulverstone, Millthorpe and Carnforth Turnpike Road Act 1818; An Act for making and maintaining a Turnpike Road from the Turnpike Road leading from Ulverstone to Kendall into the Turnpike Road leading from Millthorpe to Kendal and a Continuation of the said Road from the last mentioned Turnpike Road to join the Turnpike Road leading from Lancaster to Kendal.
Warrington and Lower Irlam Turnpike Trust	1753	26 Geo. 2. c. 63	Lancashire Roads Act 1753; An Act for repairing and widening the Roads from a certain Place in the Town of Salford, to the Towns of Warrington and Bolton, and through Wardley Lane to the Town of Wigan, and to the Stocks in the Township of Duxbury, and to a Place called The Broad Oak in Worseley, in the County Palatine of Lancaster.
Warrington and Wigan Turnpike Trust	1726	13 Geo. 1. c. 10	Warrington and Wigan Road Act 1726; An Act for repairing, widening, and amending, the Road from Warrington to Wigan, in the County of Lancaster.
Werneth and Littleborough Turnpike Trust	1830	11 Geo. 4 & 1 Will. 4. c. xcii	Road from Werneth to Littleborough (Lancashire) Act 1830; An Act for improving and maintaining the Road from Werneth to Littleborough, and other Roads communicating therewith, in the County of Lancaster.
Wigan and Preston Turnpike Trust	1726	13 Geo. 1. c. 9	Wigan to Preston Road Act 1726; An Act for repairing, widening, and amending, the Roads from Wigan to Preston, in the County of Lancaster.

== Westmorland ==
Trust	Founded	Initial act	
Trust	Founded	Citation	Title
Ambleside Turnpike Trust	1824	5 Geo. 4. c. xiv	Keswick and Plumbgarth's Cross and Windermere Roads Act 1824; An Act for more effectually repairing and improving so much of the Road from Keswick in the County of Cumberland, by Dunmail Raise and Ambleside, to Kirkby in Kendal in the County of Westmorland, as is situate in the said County of Westmorland; and also the Road from Plumbgarth's Cross, near Kirkby in Kendal aforesaid, to the Lake called Windermere, in the County of Westmorland.
Appleby and Kendal Turnpike Trust	1760	1 Geo. 3. c. 43	Westmorland Roads Act 1760; An Act for repairing and widening the Road from the Borough of Appleby in the County of Westmorland, through the Township of Orton to Kirby Kendal; and from Orton to the Turnpike Road near Shapp; and from Highgate near Tebay, in a Part of the Highway between Appleby and Kirby Kendal, through the Town of Kirby Steven, to the Town of Market Brough in the said County.
Brough and Bowes Turnpike Trust	1742	16 Geo. 2. c. 3	Westmorland Roads Act 1742; An Act for repairing the Road from Bowes, in the County of York, to Brough under Stainmore, in the County of Westmorland.
Brough and Eamont Bridge Turnpike Trust	1753	26 Geo. 2. c. 67	Brough and Eamont Bridge Road Act 1753; An Act for repairing and widening the Roads from the East End of Brough under Stainmore, in the County of Westmorland, by the End of Appleby Bridge, to Emont Bridge, in the said County.
Brough and Middleton Turnpike Trust	1817	57 Geo. 3. c. xlv	Road to Middleton Bridge Act 1817; An Act for making and keeping in Repair a Carriage Road from or near the Town of Brough under Stainmore, in the County of Westmorland, to Middleton Bridge, in the Parish of Romaldkirk, in the North Riding of the County of York, with a Branch from or near Chapel House to Eggleston Bridge, in the same Parish.
Brough Bowes and Maiden Castle Turnpike Trust	1769	9 Geo. 3. c. 75	Yorkshire Roads (No. 2) Act 1769; An Act for continuing and rendering more effectual an Act for repairing the Road from Bowes, in the County of York, to Brough under Stainmore, in the County of Westmorland and for repairing and widening the Road from Maiden Castle to Kaber Cross; and Also the Road from Maiden Castle to the Coal Works at Taylor Rig, and to Tan Hill and King's Pitts; and Also the Road from Barrow's Brow to Middle Fell Dyke Nook, in the said Counties; and Also from Tan Hill and King's Pitts to Beck Crooks, and Punchott Pasture West Gate to Whaw Lane Head, and by Lilly Jocks to Reeth.
Heronsdyke and Eamont Bridge Turnpike Trust	1753	26 Geo. 2. c. 52	Lancaster and Westmorland Roads Act 1753; An Act for widening and repairing the High Road leading from Heron Syke, which divides the Counties of Lancaster and Westmorland, to the Town of Kirkby in Kendall, and from the said Town of Kirkby in Kendall, through the Town of Shapp to Emont Bridge, in the said County of Westmorland.
Ireby to Kirkby Lonsdale, Milnthorpe etc. Turnpike Trust	1753	26 Geo. 2. c. 86	Yorkshire and Westmorland Roads Act 1753; An Act for repairing, amending, and widening, the Road from Keighley in the West Riding of the County of York, to Kirkby in Kendal in the County of Westmorland.
Kirkby Stephen and Hawes Turnpike Trust	1825	6 Geo. 4. c. xii	Road from Kirkby Stephen to Sedburgh and Kirkby Kendal Act 1825; An Act for making and maintaining a Turnpike Road from Kirkby Stephen, in the County of Westmorland, into the Sedberg and Kirkby Kendal Turnpike Road, and out of and from the same Turnpike Road to Hawes in the North Riding of the County of York; and a new Branch from Hawes aforesaid to the Village of Gayle, in the Township of Hawes.
Maiden Castle and Barrows Brow Turnpike Trust	1769	9 Geo. 3. c. 75	Yorkshire Roads (No. 2) Act 1769; An Act for continuing and rendering more effectual an Act for repairing the Road from Bowes, in the County of York, to Brough under Stainmore, in the County of Westmorland and for repairing and widening the Road from Maiden Castle to Kaber Cross; and Also the Road from Maiden Castle to the Coal Works at Taylor Rig, and to Tan Hill and King's Pitts; and Also the Road from Barrow's Brow to Middle Fell Dyke Nook, in the said Counties; and Also from Tan Hill and King's Pitts to Beck Crooks, and Punchott Pasture West Gate to Whaw Lane Head, and by Lilly Jocks to Reeth.
Milnthorpe Turnpike Trust	1758	32 Geo. 2. c. 69	Westmorland Roads Act 1758; An Act for repairing, amending, and widening, the Roads from the South West End of Nether Bridge in the County of Westmorland, by Sizerghfellside, to Leven's Bridge; and from thence, through the Town of Millthrop, to Dixes; and from the Town of Millthrop aforesaid to Hangbridge; and from thence to join the Heron Syke Turnpike Road at the Guide Post near Clawthrop Hall in the County aforesaid.
Ulverston to Heversham Turnpike Trust			
