= 2006 Macclesfield Borough Council election =

2006 UK local government election

Results of the 2006 Macclesfield Borough Council election

Elections to Macclesfield Borough Council were held on 4 May 2006. One third of the council was up for election. In addition there was a by-election for the High Legh ward on the same day, where Charles Oulton (Conservative) was elected unopposed. The Conservative Party kept overall control of the council with a majority of 12 seats. Overall turnout was 34.2%.

After the election, the composition of the council was:

- Conservative 36
- Liberal Democrat 13
- Labour 6
- Handforth Ratepayers 3
- Independents 2

== Results ==
Macclesfield local election result 2006
Party	Seats	Gains	Losses	Net gain/loss	Seats %	Votes %	Votes	+/−
Conservative	11	0	0	0	55.0	56.3	14,807	
Liberal Democrats	4	0	0	0	20.0	14.7	3,874	
Labour	3	0	0	0	15.0	18.8	4,957	
Handforth Ratepayers	1	0	0	0	5.0	3.7	978	
Green	0	0	0	0	0.0	3.2	855	
Independent	1	0	0	0	5.0	3.2	842	

== Ward results ==
Alderley Edge ward results
Party	Candidate	Votes	%	±%
Conservative	Francis Keegan	921	54.9	
Liberal Democrats	Craig Browne	756	45.1	
Majority		165		
Turnout		1,677	42.60	
Conservative hold		Swing		

Disley and Lyme Handley ward results
Party	Candidate	Votes	%	±%
Conservative	Diana Thompson	932	54.9	
Liberal Democrats	Ernest Acaster	642	37.8	
Labour	Catherine Birchall	124	7.3	
Majority		290		
Turnout		1,698	46.08	
Conservative hold		Swing		

Handforth ward results
Party	Candidate	Votes	%	±%
Handforth Ratepayers	Barry Burkhill	978	43.2	
Conservative	Roderick Menlove	977	43.1	
Labour	Anthony Sutherland	311	13.7	
Majority		1		
Turnout		2,266	36.27	
Handforth Ratepayers hold		Swing		

Henbury ward results
Party	Candidate	Votes	%	±%
Conservative	James 'David' Williams	720	85.7	
Labour	Margaret Readman	120	14.3	
Majority		600		
Turnout		840	43.85	
Conservative hold		Swing		

Knutsford Over ward
Party	Candidate	Votes	%	±%
Conservative	Anthony Ranfield	712	57.6	
Labour	Brian Daulby	303	24.5	
Liberal Democrats	Roger Barlow	221	17.9	
Majority		409		
Turnout		1,236	31.25	
Conservative hold		Swing		

Macclesfield Bollinbrook ward results
Party	Candidate	Votes	%	±%
Liberal Democrats	Robert Narraway	623	43.6	
Conservative	Karen Miles	599	41.9	
Labour	Julie Alexander	206	14.4	
Majority		24		
Turnout		1,428	32.06	
Liberal Democrats hold		Swing		

Macclesfield Broken Cross ward results
Party	Candidate	Votes	%	±%
Liberal Democrats	John Goddard	514	43.6	
Conservative	Martin Hardy	500	42.4	
Labour	David Pemberton	165	14.0	
Majority		14		
Turnout		1,179	28.21	
Liberal Democrats hold		Swing		

Macclesfield Central ward results
Party	Candidate	Votes	%	±%
Labour	Richard Watson	462	42.9	
Conservative	Gillian Stratford	333	30.9	
Green	Dougal Hare	281	26.1	
Majority		129		
Turnout		1,076	24.48	
Labour hold		Swing		

Macclesfield East ward results
Party	Candidate	Votes	%	±%
Liberal Democrats	David Neilson	663	42.5	
Conservative	Matthew Davies	556	35.6	
Labour	Simon Truss	214	13.7	
Green	Belinda Jane	127	8.1	
Majority		107		
Turnout		1,560	37.43	
Liberal Democrats hold		Swing		

Macclesfield Hurdsfield ward results
Party	Candidate	Votes	%	±%
Liberal Democrats	Alan Burton	455	53.0	
Labour	Jason Wood	211	24.6	
Conservative	Eileen Talbot	192	22.4	
Majority		244		
Turnout		858	25.37	
Liberal Democrats hold		Swing		

Macclesfield Ivy ward results
Party	Candidate	Votes	%	±%
Conservative	Andrew Knowles	1,059	75.1	
Labour	James Worth	352	24.9	
Majority		707		
Turnout		1,411	34.89	
Conservative hold		Swing		

Macclesfield Ryles ward results
Party	Candidate	Votes	%	±%
Conservative	Maureen Radford	397	65.0	
Labour	David Reed	214	35.0	
Majority		183		
Turnout		611	31.14	
Conservative hold		Swing		

Macclesfield South ward results
Party	Candidate	Votes	%	±%
Labour	Gillian Boston	417	44.6	
Conservative	Lesley Smetham	352	37.7	
Green	Stephen Flinn	165	17.7	
Majority		65		
Turnout		934	22.68	
Labour hold		Swing		

Macclesfield Tytherington ward results
Party	Candidate	Votes	%	±%
Independent	Brendan Murphy	842	45.3	
Conservative	Helena 'Jane' Naumkin	780	42.0	
Labour	Harold Stedman	130	7.0	
Green	Richard Purslow	105	5.7	
Majority		62		
Turnout		1,857	40.36	
Independent hold		Swing		

Macclesfield West ward results
Party	Candidate	Votes	%	±%
Labour	Karen Whittle	544	58.6	
Conservative	Cheryl Evans	385	41.4	
Majority		159		
Turnout		929	24.62	
Labour hold		Swing		

Poynton Central ward results
Party	Candidate	Votes	%	±%
Conservative	Howard Murray	1,366	76.9	
Labour	Judith Elderkin	411	23.1	
Majority		955		
Turnout		1,777	31.76	
Conservative hold		Swing		

Poynton West ward results
Party	Candidate	Votes	%	±%
Conservative	David Robbie	1,129	77.8	
Labour	Elizabeth Middleton	322	22.2	
Majority		807		
Turnout		1,451	33.52	
Conservative hold		Swing		

Prestbury ward results
Party	Candidate	Votes	%	±%
Conservative	Thelma Jackson	1,495	92.1	
Labour	David Jackson	129	7.9	
Majority		1,366		
Turnout		1,624	38.76	
Conservative hold		Swing		

Rainow ward results
Party	Candidate	Votes	%	±%
Conservative	Harold Davenport	720	70.1	
Green	John Knight	177	17.2	
Labour	David Brown	130	12.7	
Majority		543		
Turnout		1,027	48.37	
Conservative hold		Swing		

Sutton ward results
Party	Candidate	Votes	%	±%
Conservative	Hilda Gaddum	682	78.0	
Labour	John Evans	192	22.0	
Majority		490		
Turnout		874	47.07	
Conservative hold		Swing		

Preceded by 2004 Macclesfield Council election	Macclesfield local elections	Succeeded by 2007 Macclesfield Council election
