= Ollerton Hall =

Country house in Cheshire, England

Coordinates: 53.28095°N 2.32352°W

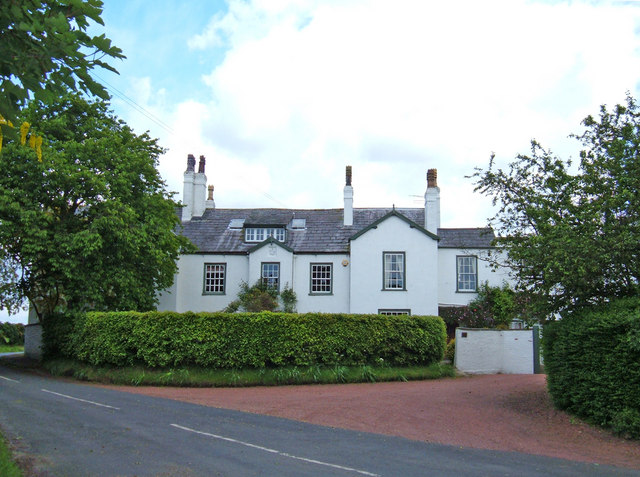
Ollerton Hall

Ollerton Hall is a country house in the village of Ollerton, Cheshire, England. Its nucleus dates from the 16th century, originally on an H-plan, followed by a succession of "rambling extensions". A plaque over the entrance is inscribed with the initials THP" (for Thomas Henry Potts) and the date 1728. The house was built originally for the De Baguley family. The building is constructed in rendered brick with a slate roof. It is in two storeys and, with the later extensions, has an E-plan. The entrance front has five bays, the central bay projecting forward with a gable. At each end is a gabled cross wing. The windows are a mixture of sashes and casements. The house is recorded in the National Heritage List for England as a designated Grade II listed building. Previous occupants of the hall included Lord Edward Murray

== See also ==
- Listed buildings in Ollerton, Cheshire
