= A537 road =

Road in England

A537

Route information
- Length: 17 mi (27 km)

Major junctions
- West end: Knutsford
- A535 A523
- East end: Buxton

Location
- Country: United Kingdom
- Primary destinations: Macclesfield

Road network
- Roads in the United Kingdom; Motorways; A and B road zones

The A537 is a road linking Knutsford, in Cheshire, and Buxton, in Derbyshire. Part of the route includes the Cat and Fiddle Road, one of the most dangerous roads in Great Britain.

== Route ==
The A537 starts in Knutsford at traffic light controlled T-junction with the A50; traffic has to turn onto the A537. The road travels to a set of traffic lights, the turn off for the B5085 to Mobberley and Alderley Edge. Now known as Chelford Road, it travels to the edge of the town, passing Toft Cricket club and leaving the town at a roundabout.

The road then heads towards Ollerton and Chelford, crossing the Crewe to Manchester branch of the West Coast Main Line and shortly after, there is a roundabout junction with the A535. After this, the road goes to Monks Heath, where at a set of traffic lights, it crosses the A34.

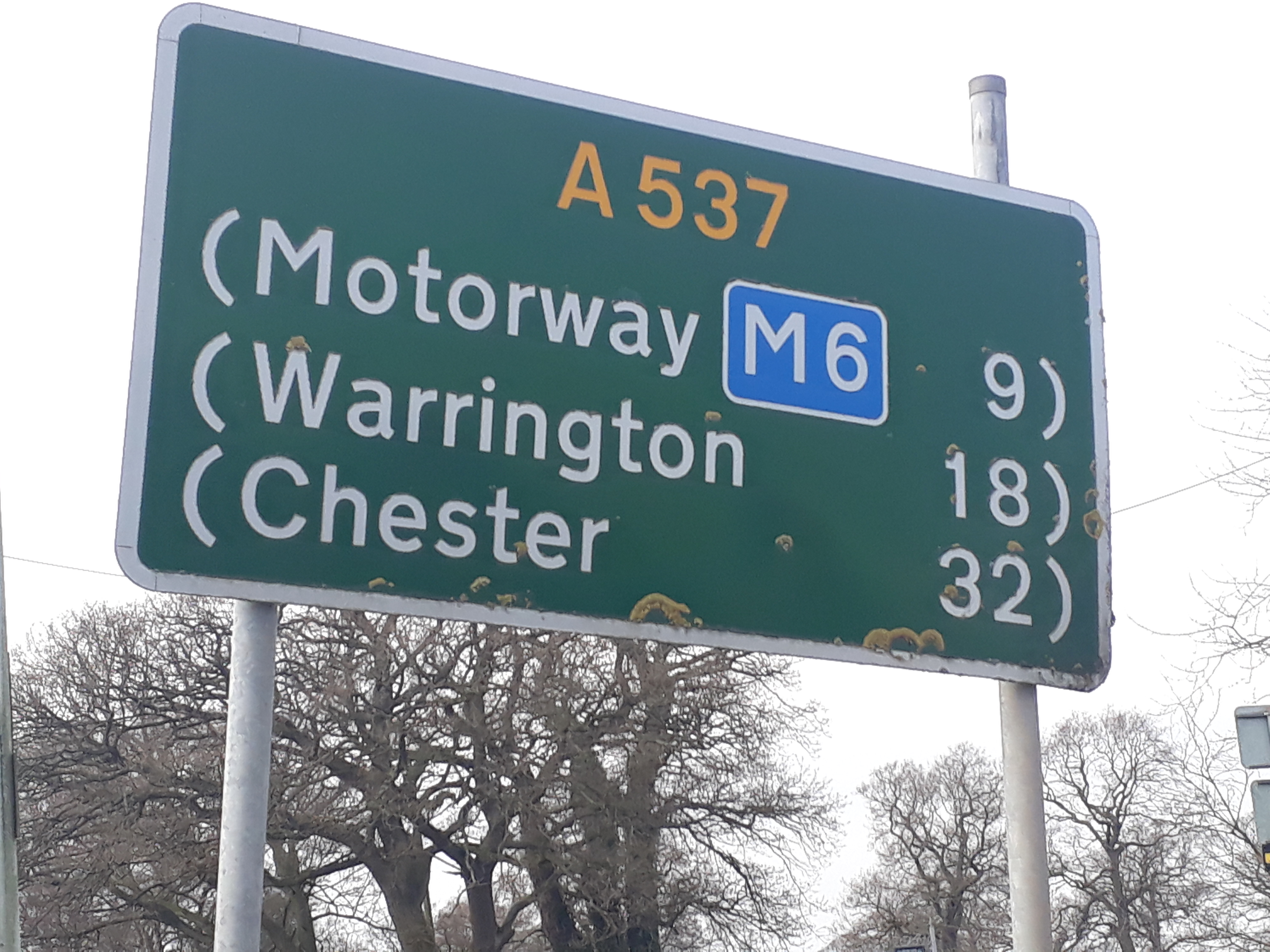
A537 distance sign just after Monk's Heath

After Monks Heath, the road narrows slightly and traverses several sweeping bends before straightening somewhat and entering Macclesfield as Chester Road. There are two roundabouts for local road junctions before the A537 has a roundabout junction with the B5088, which carries a lot of traffic entering Macclesfield from the south into the town centre. There is then a series of roundabouts and other junctions; first, the B5087 Prestbury Road, then Westminster Road and finally the roundabout with Churchill Way, the B5181. This section of the road is prone to congestion, especially at peak times.

After this roundabout, the road proceeds down Hibel Road, through a set of traffic lights and at a roundabout at the bottom of the hill, turns right and joins the A523 Silk Road for a short distance, before turning off left at traffic lights outside Arighi Bianchi and climbing the hill as Buxton Road.

After leaving Macclesfield, as Buxton New Road, the A537 continues its climb toward the Cat and Fiddle Inn. The road is a mixture of some straight sections and some sharp, often blind bends, which are challenging to drivers and motorcyclists. After the Cat and Fiddle Inn, the highest point on the route, the road descends gently towards the junction with the A54, where the A537 ends despite it being the through road at the junction.
