= Marthall =

Village in Cheshire, England

Coordinates: 53.278092°N 2.302749°W

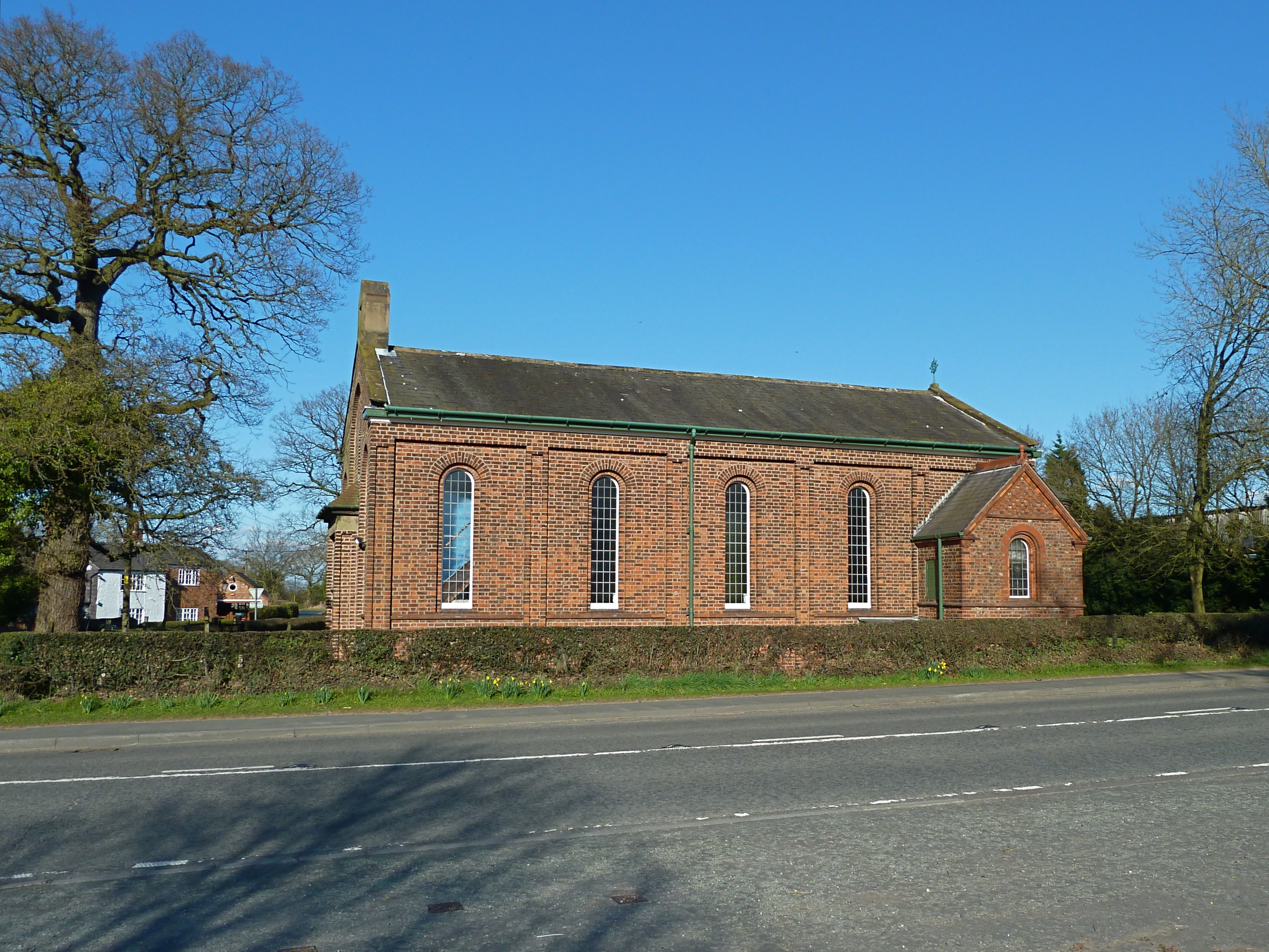
- All Saints Church, Marthall

- Location within Cheshire
- OS grid reference: SJ779766
- Unitary authority: Cheshire East
- Ceremonial county: Cheshire
- Region: North West
- Country: England
- Sovereign state: United Kingdom
- Post town: KNUTSFORD
- Postcode district: WA16
- Dialling code: 01565
- Police: Cheshire
- Fire: Cheshire
- Ambulance: North West
- UK Parliament: Tatton

Marthall is a village in the unitary authority of Cheshire East and the ceremonial county of Cheshire, England. It is around 3 miles from Knutsford.

The village is small; it has a village hall, a church and a pub (the Egerton Arms, on the outskirts of the nearby village of Chelford). In 1976, Marthall civil parish was formed in its present state by including the neighbouring village, Ollerton. Although they still keep their old identities and village boundaries, they come together in a shared parish council and other facilities. As the population measured at the 2011 Census was only minimal, details are included in the civil parish of Ollerton, Cheshire.

== See also ==
- Listed buildings in Marthall
