= Curbishley =

Curbishley is a surname. Notable people with the surname include:

- Alan Curbishley (born 1957), English football player and manager
- Allison Curbishley (born 1976), British athlete
- Bill Curbishley (born 1942), English music and film producer

== See also ==
- Corbishley, surname
