= St John the Evangelist's Church, Chelford =

Coordinates: 53.2624°N 2.2727°W

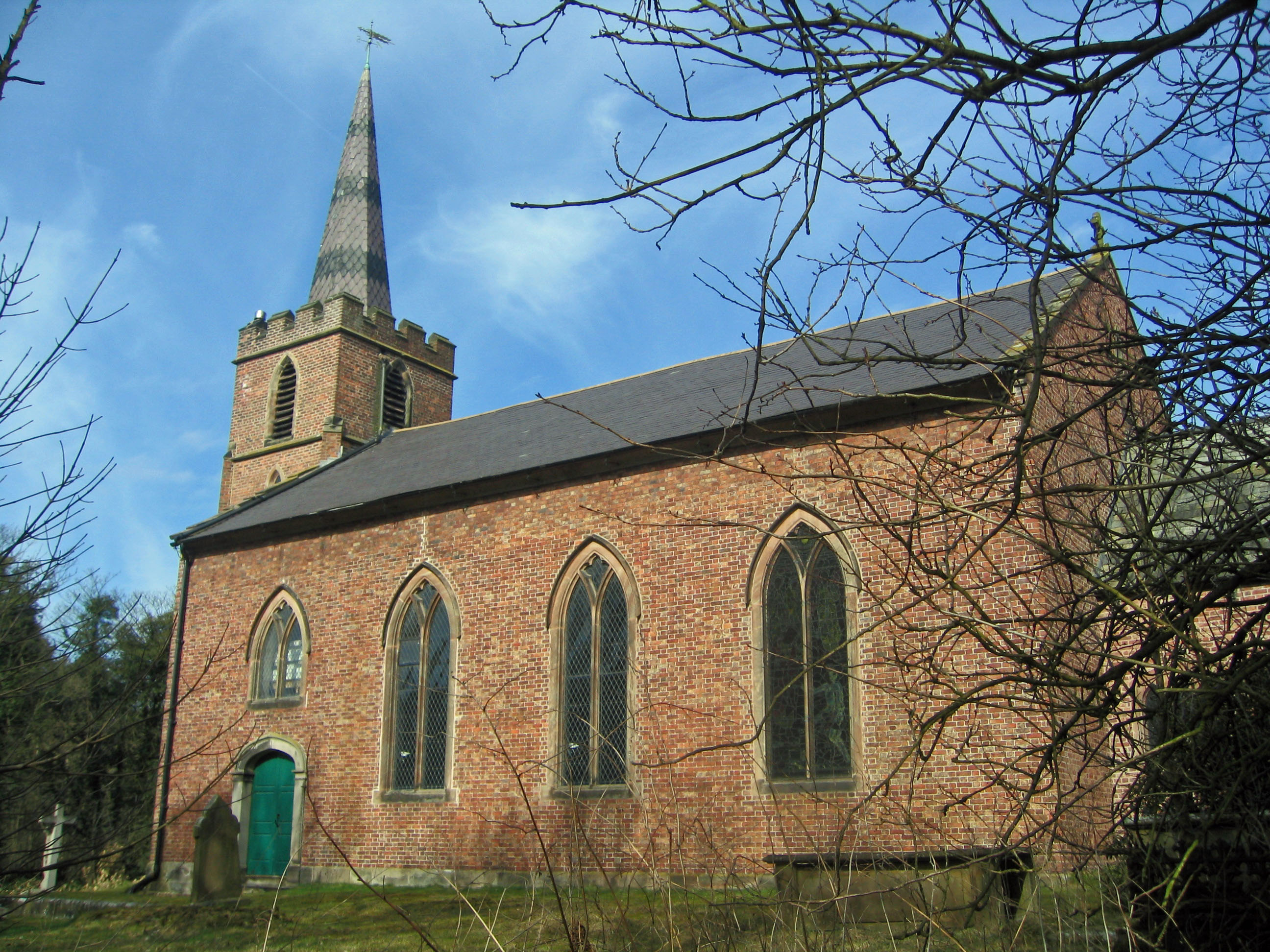
- St John the Evangelist's Church, Chelford, from the south

- Location in Cheshire
- OS grid reference: SJ 819 740
- Location: Chelford, Cheshire
- Country: England
- Denomination: Anglican
- Website: St John the Evangelist, Chelford

History
- Status: Parish church
- Dedication: John the Evangelist

Architecture
- Functional status: Active
- Heritage designation: Grade II*
- Designated: 14 April 1967
- Architectural type: Church
- Completed: c. 1902

Specifications
- Materials: Brick with stone dressings Slate roof

Administration
- Province: York
- Diocese: Chester
- Archdeaconry: Macclesfield
- Deanery: Knutsford
- Parish: St John the Evangelist, Chelford, with Lower Withington

St John the Evangelist's Church lies to the southeast of the village of Chelford, Cheshire, England. The church is recorded in the National Heritage List for England as a designated Grade II* listed building. It is an active Anglican parish church in the diocese of Chester, the archdeaconry of Macclesfield and the deanery of Knutsford. Its benefice is combined with that of St Peter, Lower Withington.

== History ==
The original church on the site was probably a medieval timber-framed chapel. This was replaced in 1774–76 with a church that was little more than a "plain brick box with slightly pointed windows". The west tower was added in 1840, and the chancel was extended in 1902.

== Architecture ==
=== Exterior ===
The church is constructed in brick with stone dressings and has a slate roof. Its plan consists of a four-bay nave with a west gallery, a two-bay chancel and a west tower with a recessed spire. The tower is in three stages with diagonal buttresses and an embattled parapet. The spire is octagonal, covered with diamond-shaped slates and crowned by a weather vane. The west front of the tower has an arched doorway and a clock face.

=== Interior ===
In the church are 18th-century box pews. The gallery has been boxed in and converted into a meeting room. The walls contain paintings in Art Nouveau style. Also in Art Nouveau style are the pulpit, the altar rails and the choir stalls which were designed by Percy Worthington and which date from 1903. The chancel has a stone-mosaic floor. The stained glass includes war memorials of 1920 and 1921, designed by J. H. Dearle, and made by Morris & Co. In the porch is a memorial window of 2009 by Samantha Land. In the church is a painted memorial board dated 1654 inscribed with a poem. There is a ring of six bells dated 1885 by Mears and Stainbank of the Whitechapel Bell Foundry.

== External features ==
The churchyard contains the war grave of a First World War soldier of the Cheshire Regiment.

== See also ==
- Grade II* listed buildings in Cheshire East
- Listed buildings in Chelford
