= Astley =

Astley may refer to:

== People ==
- Astley (name)

== Places in England ==
- Astley, Greater Manchester, a village
- Astley, Warwickshire, a village and parish
- Astley, Worcestershire, a village and parish
- Astley, Shropshire, a village and parish
- Astley Village, in Lancashire
- Astley's, London, Astley's Equestrian Amphitheatre
- Astley Castle, North Warwickshire

== See also ==
- Astle (disambiguation)
