= Listed buildings in Ollerton, Cheshire =

Ollerton is a civil parish in Cheshire East, England. It contains 12 buildings that are recorded in the National Heritage List for England as designated listed buildings, all of which are at Grade II. This grade is the lowest of the three gradings given to listed buildings and is applied to "buildings of national importance and special interest". Apart from the village of Ollerton, the parish is rural. Other than a milepost, all the listed buildings are houses and associated structures, all but one dated before 1800.

Name and location	Photograph	Date	Notes
Bryn-y-Baer Lodge; 53.28684°N 2.33679°W	—	17th century	There have been later additions and alterations to the house, which is in two storeys and has a slate roof. The original part is timber-framed with rendered infill on a stone plinth. A 19th-century porch has been added. To the left of this are two windows in the ground floor and one window above.
Manor Farmhouse; 53.28470°N 2.33932°W	—	c. 1670	A brick farmhouse on a stone plinth with a slate roof in two storeys. There have been additions in stone that are partly rendered. The original entrance has been partly blocked and replaced by a 19th-century porch to the left. The windows are mullioned. There is a 19th-century extension to the right of the house with a canted bay window.
Farmer Wright's Cottage; 53.27392°N 2.32085°W	—	Late 17th century	A timber-framed house with brick infill and a thatched roof. It is in a single storey with an attic. Extensions were added to the house in the 18th, 19th and 20th centuries. There are two eyebrow dormers in the upper floor.
Oak Farm House; 53.27744°N 2.32427°W	—	Late 17th century	The farmhouse was altered and extended in each of the following centuries. The older parts are timber-framed with brick infill, and the later parts are in brick, some of it painted to simulate timber-framing. The house is in two storeys, and has a T-shaped plan. The windows are casements, and other features include a dormer and a datestone.
Ollerton School House; 53.27921°N 2.32388°W	—	1692	A schoolroom and a schoolmaster's house that was extended in the 18th century, the building is in painted red brick with slate roofs. There are two storeys and two bays, with the single-storey schoolroom to the left and a lean-to extension on the right. The date is inscribed on the surround of the schoolroom door, and the windows are replacement casements.
Ollerton Hall and Ollerton End; 53.28113°N 2.32317°W		1728	Originally a country house, it has been converted into two dwellings. The house is built in rendered brick with a slate roof. It is in two storeys, and originally had an E-shaped plan, with projecting gabled wings in the centre and at the sides. A two-bay extension was added to both sides of the house in the 19th century. In the central bay is a doorway with a pointed arch, and a datestone. The windows are a mix of sashes and casements.
Ollerton Lodge; 53.28026°N 2.32397°W	—	Late 18th century	A brick house with a slate roof, in three storeys with a front of three bays. The central doorway has a segmental fanlight To the left is a bow window, and the windows are sashes. At the top of the house is a modillion cornice. There is a 19th-century rendered extension to the right.
Ollerton House; 53.28515°N 2.33113°W	—	1777	A brick house with a slate roof, it is in three storeys, and has a symmetrical entrance front of three bays. There is a central doorway, and the windows are sashes. At the top of the house is a pediment containing a datestone.
Gazebo and garden wall, Ollerton House; 53.28516°N 2.33141°W	—	c. 1777	The gazebo stands in the corner of the garden, it is square, built in brick, and has a slate roof. On the road side is a sash window and facing the garden is a doorway. The garden wall is also in brick, it has a stone coping, and is about 6 feet (1.8 m) high.
Stables and garden wall, Ollerton House; 53.28509°N 2.33094°W	—	c. 1777	The stables are in brick with a stone-slate wall, and are in two storeys. On the road front is an arched doorway, with a window and a square pitch hole above. The wall is also in brick, and has a stone coping. It stretches to the left, contains an archway, and then continues at a lower height along the front of the house, where it carries a cast-iron railing.
Milepost; 53.28800°N 2.33759°W	—	c. 1830	The milepost is in cast iron. It consists of a round post with an acorn finial. It carries a plate with the distances in miles to Macclesfield and to Knutsford.
Kerfield Lodge; 53.28889°N 2.34379°W	—	Early to mid 19th century	A lodge to a house, now demolished, later used as a cottage. It is built in brick with a Welsh slate roof, it is in a single story with an attic, and has an octagonal plan. There are four shaped gables and a central octagonal chimney.
