= Chelford Manor House =

Manor house in Cheshire, England

Coordinates: 53.26418°N 2.27107°W

Chelford Manor House stands to the southeast of the village of Chelford, Cheshire, England. It dates from the early 17th century. An extension was made to it in 1671, and more alterations and additions were carried out in the 19th and 20th centuries. The last addition was made for Colonel Dixon of Astle Hall. The house is timber-framed on a stone plinth. The infill is either brick or rendered brick. It is roofed in slate and cement tiles. It is a "complex" building, with parts in two storeys, and other parts in three storeys. The house is recorded in the National Heritage List for England as a designated Grade II* listed building. To the north of the manor house is a former tithe barn. This is also timber-framed with brick infill, and is listed at Grade II.

== See also ==
- Grade II* listed buildings in Cheshire East
- Listed buildings in Chelford
