= Snelson, Cheshire =

Former civil parish in Cheshire, England

Coordinates: 53.261°N 2.287°W

Snelson
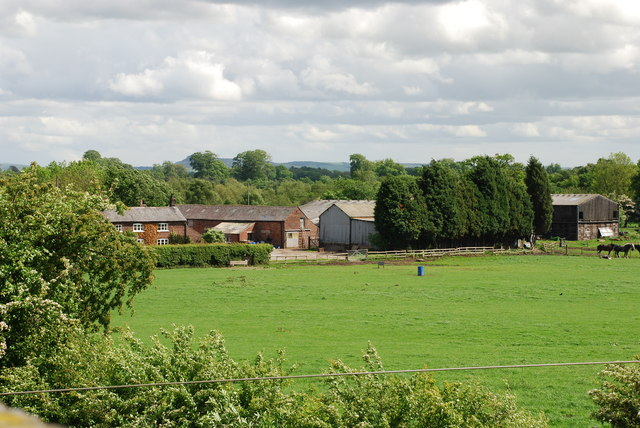
- Wood End Farm, Snelson

- Location within Cheshire
- Population: 161 (2011)
- OS grid reference: SJ808738
- Civil parish: Peover Superior and Snelson
- Unitary authority: Cheshire East
- Ceremonial county: Cheshire
- Region: North West
- Country: England
- Sovereign state: United Kingdom
- Post town: MACCLESFIELD
- Postcode district: SK11
- Dialling code: 01625
- Police: Cheshire
- Fire: Cheshire
- Ambulance: North West
- UK Parliament: Tatton

Snelson is a former civil parish, now in the parish of Peover Superior and Snelson, in the Cheshire East district and ceremonial county of Cheshire in England. In 2001 it had a population of 157, rising marginally to 161 at the 2011 Census.

== History ==
Snelson was formerly a township in the parish of Rostherne, in 1866 Snelson became a civil parish, on 1 April 2023 the parish was abolished and merged with Peover Superior to form "Peover Superior and Snelson".

== See also ==
- Listed buildings in Snelson, Cheshire
