= Corbishley =

Corbishley is a surname. Notable people with the surname include:

- Amy Gertrude Corbishley (1889–1977), South African botanist
- Cam Corbishley (born 1997), English race walker
- Colin Corbishley (1939–2015), English footballer

== See also ==
- Curbishley, surname
