= A535 road =

Road in England

A535

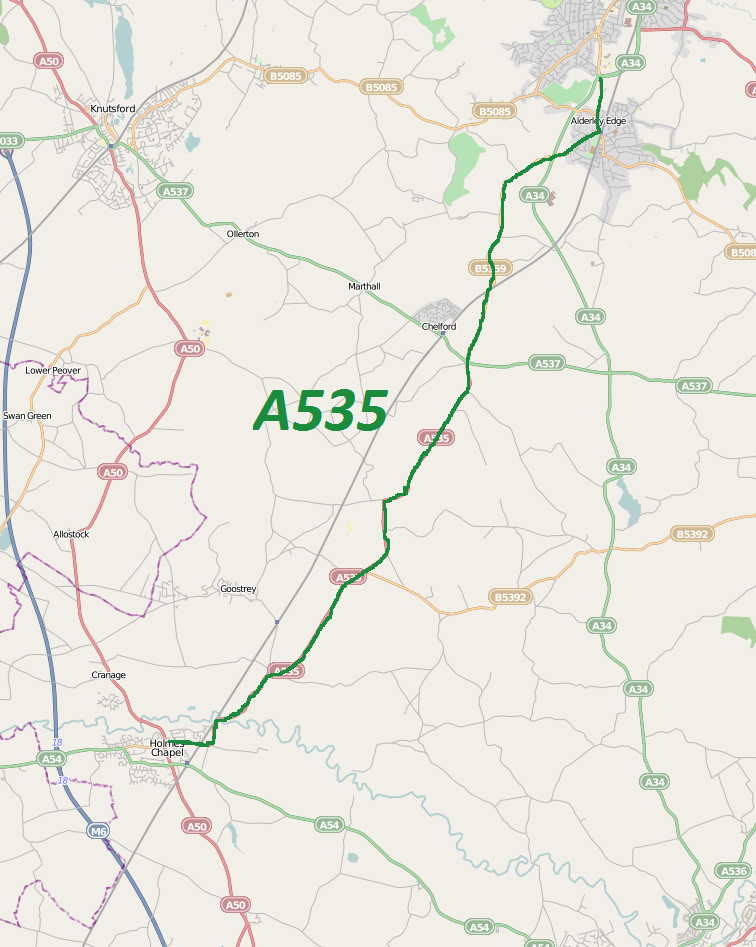

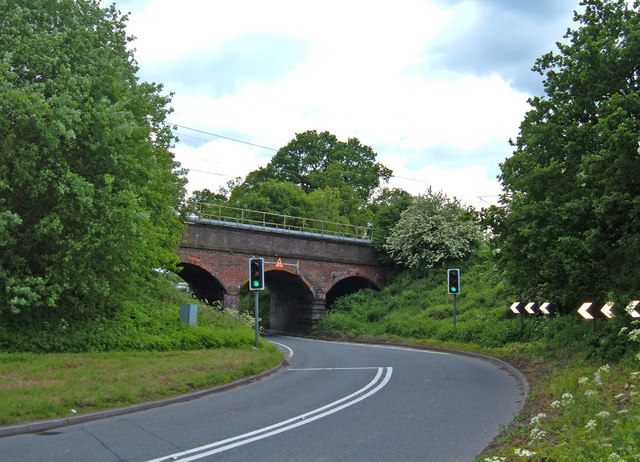

Route information
- Length: 6.3 mi (10.1 km)

Major junctions
- South end: Holmes Chapel, Cheshire
- A50 A537
- North end: Chelford, Cheshire

Location
- Country: United Kingdom
- Primary destinations: Jodrell Bank

Road network
- Roads in the United Kingdom; Motorways; A and B road zones

The A535 road is a non-primary route in England that runs from Holmes Chapel, Cheshire to Alderley Edge, Cheshire. It passes through the Dane River valley. It is the main road that gives access to the Jodrell Bank Observatory and the Quinta Arboretum, planted by Sir Bernard Lovell in 1948.

== History ==
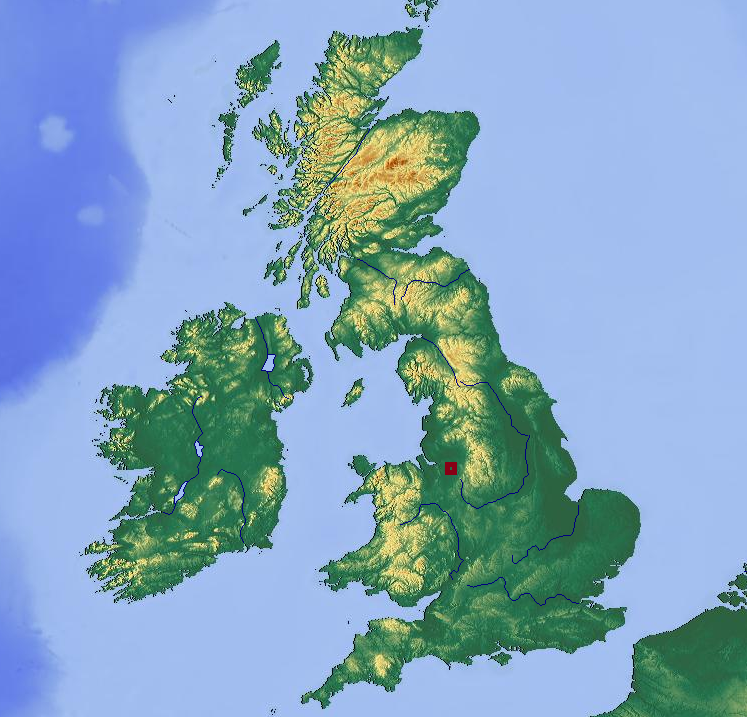
Location area of the A535 in the United Kingdom (marked red)

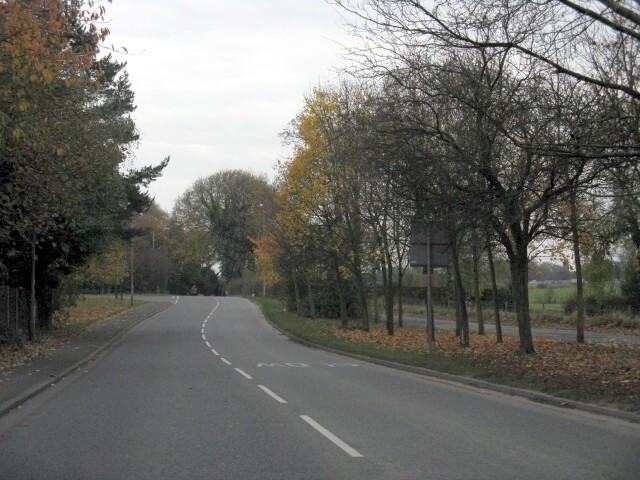
A535 approaching Chorley Hall heading south. The approaching left road is Chorley Lane.

In medieval times part of the existing A535 route provided access to Chorley Old Hall and moat near Alderley Edge, a Grade I listed building and scheduled monument. This part of the road is known as "Ryley's Lane". The original part of the house was built around 1330 by Robert de Chorley. The Stanley family carried out alterations around 1640 and built a bridge across the moat. Just past the hall, a lane leads off to the east which is named after the hall, Chorley Lane. In historical times, this lane leading off what is now the A535 road was the main road leading to Macclesfield from Alderley Hall, and was the continuation of the Macclesfield Road. This stretch is now the B5087 road. From the 16th to the 18th century, the Booth family were the major landowners in the southern part of the road in the Twemlow area. They built a grand mansion at Twemlow Hall in the area which can be viewed along the A535 road from Holmes Chapel to Goostrey on a hill top.

Hulmes Chapel and Chelford Road Act 1797
- Act of Parliament
- Parliament of Great Britain
- Long title: An Act for amending, altering, widening, improving, and keeping in repair, the road from the present turnpike road at Hulmes Chapel in the county palatine of Chester, leading from Hulmes Chapel to Knutsford, to the south bridge in Chelford, in the said county, near to Chelford Chapel.
- Citation: 37 Geo. 3. c. 157
- Territorial extent: Great Britain

Dates
- Royal assent: 24 April 1797
- Commencement: 24 April 1797 (Note: The Acts of Parliament (Commencement) Act 1793.)
- Repealed: 10 August 1872
Other legislation
Amended by	Hulmes Chapel and Chelford Road Act 1820
Repealed by	Annual Turnpike Acts Continuance Act 1872

Status: Repealed

Text of statute as originally enacted

Hulmes Chapel and Chelford Road Act 1820
- Act of Parliament
- Parliament of the United Kingdom
- Long title: An Act for enlarging the Term and Powers of an Act passed in the Thirty seventh Year of His late Majesty, for repairing the Road from Hulmes Chapel, in the County Palatine of Chester, to the South Bridge in Chelford, in the said County.
- Citation: 1 Geo. 4. c. xvii
- Territorial extent: United Kingdom

Dates
- Royal assent: 22 June 1820
- Commencement: 22 June 1820
- Repealed: 10 August 1872
Other legislation
Amends	Hulmes Chapel and Chelford Road Act 1797
Repealed by	Annual Turnpike Acts Continuance Act 1872

Status: Repealed

Text of statute as originally enacted

Turnpike trusts were created to charge tolls and use the money to maintain the road. For the section between Hulmes Chapel and Chelford, the Hulmes Chapel and Chelford Road Act 1797 (37 Geo. 3. c. 157) and Hulmes Chapel and Chelford Road Act 1820 (1 Geo. 4. c. xvii) were passed for this purpose.

In 1831, Corbishley Bridge was erected along the road to the northeast of Chelford, to the west of the hamlet of Corbishley to facilitate the railway line. In 1898, the Cheshire County Council erected a signpost near Withington Hall along the road.

From September 1952, the road became the main road of transport of shifting building materials for the building of the Jodrell Bank Observatory. The first major constructional work was completed in the summer of 1957, and eventually five telescopes were installed at the centre under the guidance of Sir Bernard Lovell. Lovell acknowledged that delivering the telescope parts over the level crossing along the A535 may have been problematic but he didn't anticipate any major difficulties. Jodrell Bank Observatory has since become the main tourist attraction of the area.

During the summer of 2010, the construction of the A34 Alderley Bypass affected the road network in the area and meant that as one road was closed off, traffic had to frequently be diverted. The road used to connect to the A34 at a junction in Alderley Edge, but with the opening of the A34 Alderley Bypass in November 2010, the A535 now terminates at the roundabout on the A537 in Chelford. The part of the A535 from the Chelford roundabout to Alderley Edge was joined with the section of the old A34 from Alderley Edge to the Whitehall Bridge roundabout and renamed B5359.

== Route ==
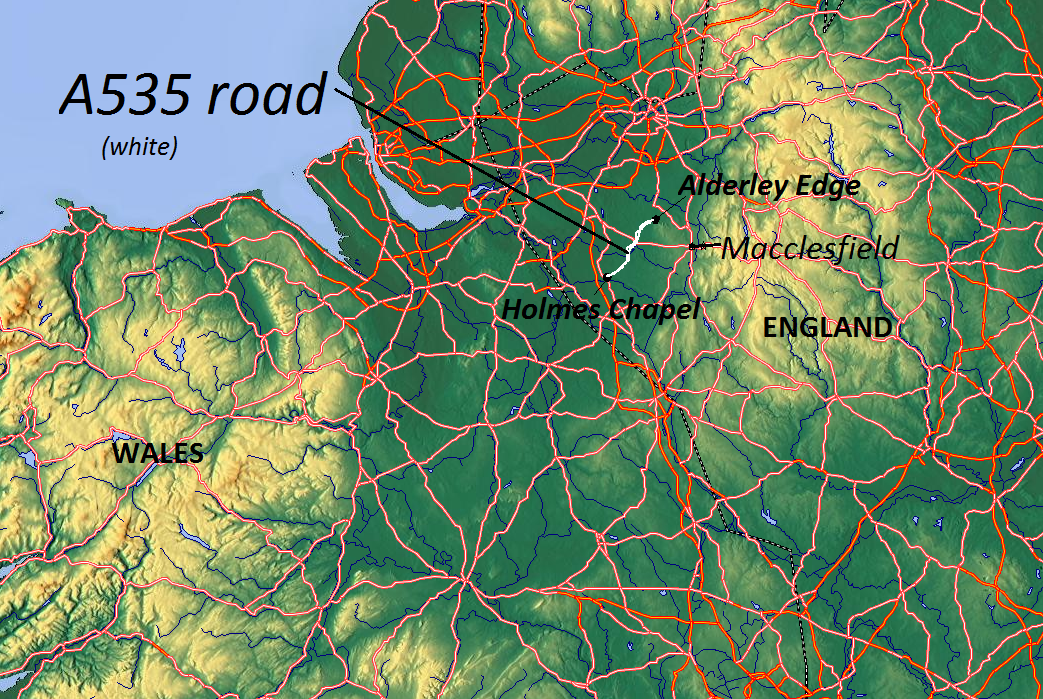
Location (A535 marked roughly in white)

Starting at a double mini-roundabout in the centre of Holmes Chapel at 53°12′9″N 2°21′26″W, the road heads eastwards where it is initially known as Macclesfield Road, before heading northeastwards and crossing the Crewe to Manchester branch of the West Coast Main Line. It passes the village of Twemlow Green, running alongside the Twemlow Viaduct. After the gentle climb out of Twemlow, the Lovell Telescope of Jodrell Bank is in view, with access to the site being from a sharp left turn into Bomish Lane. At Jodrell Bank is a road leading off to the east which is initially called Farm Lane, leading to Lower Withington. This is part of the B5392 road which eventually joins the A537 at Broken Cross in the western suburbs of Macclesfield.

After passing through the village of Withington Green, a lane passes off the east called Catch Penny lane which leads to Deans Rough Farm and a Catch Penny lake. Further north is Farm Wood Quarry on its left, an area which the road passes which has had several notable geological examinations conducted into it.

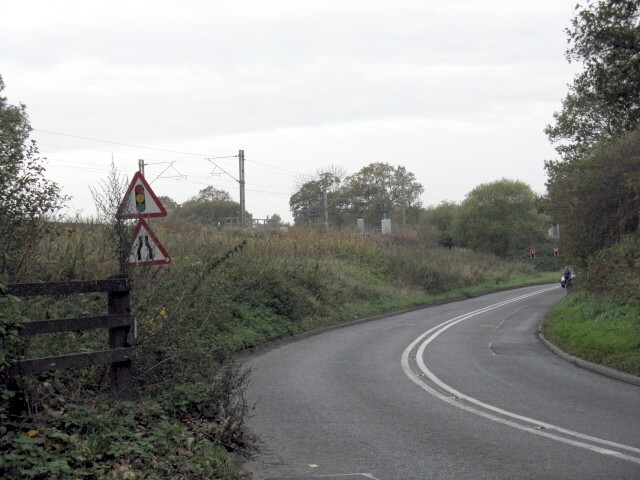
Approaching Corbishley Bridge

The road continues to past Astle Hall, site of the annual 1000 Engine Rally in June, and also the Astle Park Steam Rally (at Astle Park) in August, to Chelford, where it terminates at the A537 roundabout. Originally the A535 continued from the roundabout on the A537 towards Alderley Edge, but this section of the A535 was downgraded and renamed B5359 following the opening of the new A34 bypass in 2010. Shortly after leaving Chelford the B5359 passes under the Crewe to Manchester line at Corbishley Bridge, and continues through the village of Alderley Edge and finally ends at the Whitehall Bridge roundabout on the new A34.
