= Lower Withington =

Village in Cheshire, England

Coordinates: 53.224°N 2.279°W

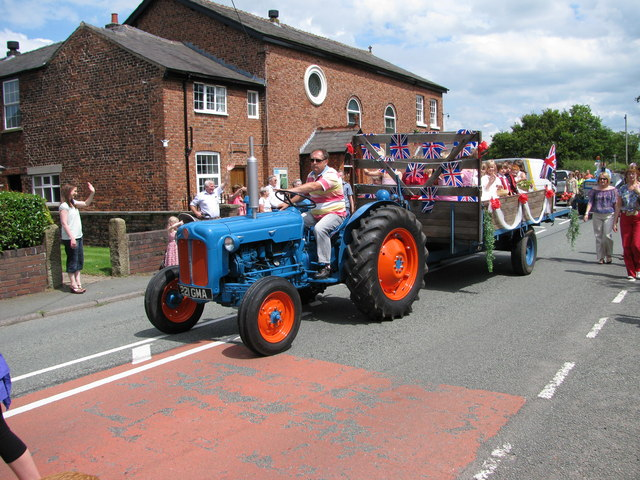
- Rose Day Procession, Lower Withington

- Location within Cheshire
- Population: 492 (2001)
- OS grid reference: SJ813698
- Civil parish: Lower Withington
- Unitary authority: Cheshire East
- Ceremonial county: Cheshire
- Region: North West
- Country: England
- Sovereign state: United Kingdom
- Post town: MACCLESFIELD
- Postcode district: SK11
- Dialling code: 01477
- Police: Cheshire
- Fire: Cheshire
- Ambulance: North West
- UK Parliament: Macclesfield

Lower Withington is a civil parish and village in Cheshire, England. At the 2001 census, it had a population of 492. Jodrell Bank Observatory lies mostly within the parish.

It is on the B5392 near the A535 road, 11 kilometres (7 mi) south-west of Macclesfield and 29 kilometres (18 mi) south of Manchester.

== See also ==
- Listed buildings in Lower Withington
