= Astle, New Brunswick =

Community in New Brunswick, Canada

Coordinates: 46.41548°N 66.46557°W

Location of Astle in New Brunswick

Astle is a community in the Canadian province of New Brunswick.

== See also ==
- List of communities in New Brunswick
