= Chelford =

Village and civil parish in Cheshire, England

Coordinates: 53.270°N 2.279°W

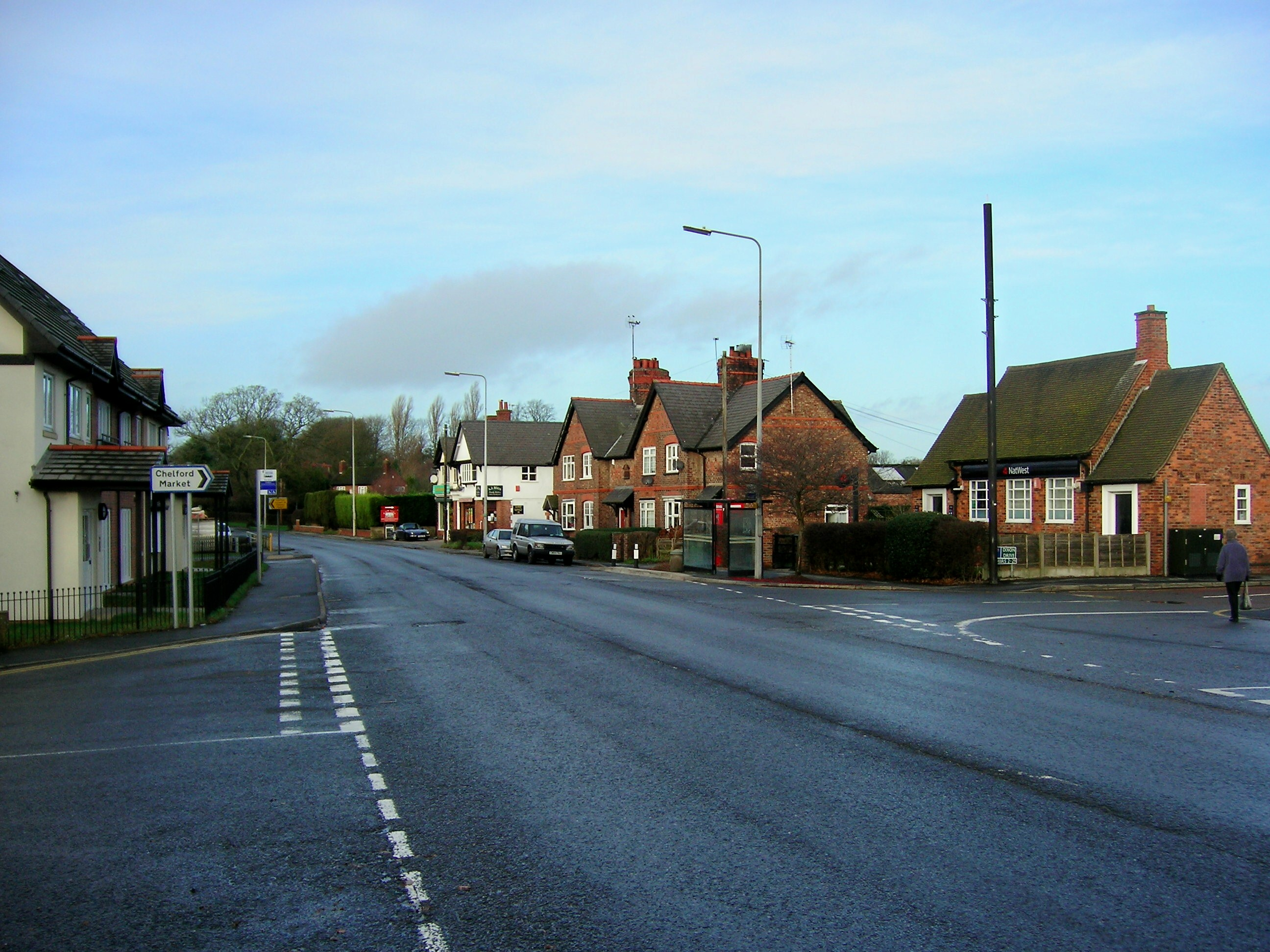
- A view of Chelford

- Location within Cheshire
- Population: 1,174 (2011)
- OS grid reference: SJ814749
- Civil parish: Chelford
- Unitary authority: Cheshire East
- Ceremonial county: Cheshire
- Region: North West
- Country: England
- Sovereign state: United Kingdom
- Post town: MACCLESFIELD
- Postcode district: SK11
- Dialling code: 01625
- Police: Cheshire
- Fire: Cheshire
- Ambulance: North West
- UK Parliament: Tatton

Chelford is a village and civil parish in Cheshire, England; it includes the hamlet of Astle. It lies six miles (10 km) west of Macclesfield and six miles south-east of Knutsford. The village forms part of the Tatton parliamentary constituency. At the 2011 census, Chelford had a population of 1,174.

== History ==
In the 15th century, the village had a watermill, the Bate Mill. In the late 1780s, Chelford was one of the larger villages in Cheshire and had several shops.

In 1894, 14 people died in the Chelford rail accident.

A large cattle market was held at Chelford every Monday for over a century, but it was closed on 30 March 2017. Business has been transferred to the market at Beeston and the former site is to be used for housing. In November 2019, a Google Earth view showed only the foundations, as the Chelford Market buildings had been demolished.

== Geography ==
Chelford is sited near to the Capesthorne Estate and is surrounded by farmland.

Almost all inhabitants of the village live on one estate, where the only way in or out is via the main road.

== Amenities ==
Local amenities include a post office, the Egerton Arms pub and an agricultural supplies business, Chelford Farm Supplies.

St John's Church is the burial place of former world champion racing cyclist Reg Harris and the venue for an annual cyclists' Christmas Carol service.

== Transport ==
The village lies near to the junction of the A537 and A535 roads.

Chelford railway station is a stop on the Crewe-Manchester line. Northern Trains operates generally hourly services between Crewe, Stockport and Manchester Piccadilly.

D&G Bus operates the 87 bus route through the village, which links Macclesfield with Knutsford.

== See also ==
- Astle Hall
- Chelford Manor House
- Listed buildings in Chelford
- St John the Evangelist's Church, Chelford
