= 2007 Macclesfield Borough Council election =

2007 UK local government election

Results of the 2007 Macclesfield Borough Council election

Elections to Macclesfield Borough Council in England were held on 3 May 2007. One third of the council was up for election and the Conservative Party kept overall control of the council with a majority of 16 seats. Overall turnout was 35.9%.

After the election, the composition of the council was:

- Conservative 38
- Liberal Democrat 12
- Labour 6
- Handforth Ratepayers 2
- Independents 2

== Results ==
Macclesfield local election result 2007
Party	Seats	Gains	Losses	Net gain/loss	Seats %	Votes %	Votes	+/−
Conservative	12	3	1	+2	60.0	54.0	15,401	-2.3
Liberal Democrats	4	0	1	-1	25.0	18.8	5,353	+4.1
Labour	3	0	0	0	15.0	17.0	4,836	-1.8
Handforth Ratepayers	0	0	1	-1	0.0	3.6	1,039	-0.1
Green	0	0	0	0	0.0	2.3	655	-0.9
UKIP	0	0	0	0	0.0	0.7	191	New
Independent	1	1	1	0	5.0	3.6	1,037	+0.4

== Ward results ==
Dean Row ward results
Party	Candidate	Votes	%	±%
Conservative	Jim Crockatt	1,122	67.2	
Liberal Democrats	Mark Toombs	547	32.8	
Majority		575		
Turnout		1,669	41.07	
Conservative hold		Swing		

Disley and Lyme Handley ward results
Party	Candidate	Votes	%	±%
Conservative	Jackie Pattison	1,182	75.0	+20.1
Labour	Catherine Birchall	395	25.0	+25.0
Majority		787		
Turnout		1,577	43.22	+0.62
Conservative gain from Liberal Democrats		Swing		

Fulshaw ward results
Party	Candidate	Votes	%	±%
Conservative	David Mowat	1,010	66.4	
Liberal Democrats	Helen Baker	296	19.4	
Labour	Mark Norman	216	14.2	
Majority		714		
Turnout		1,522	39.85	
Conservative hold		Swing		

Handforth ward results
Party	Candidate	Votes	%	±%
Conservative	Gary Barton	1,110	44.6	+1.5
Handforth Ratepayers	David Pincombe	1,039	41.7	−1.5
Labour	Ashley Pettifer	340	13.7	0.0
Majority		71		
Turnout		2,489	38.94	+2.67
Conservative gain from Handforth Ratepayers		Swing		

Hough ward results
Party	Candidate	Votes	%	±%
Conservative	Rod Menlove	1,077	67.0	
Liberal Democrats	Richard Duncalf	397	24.7	
Labour	Jon Kelly	133	8.3	
Majority		680		
Turnout		1,607	40.56	
Conservative hold		Swing		

Knutsford Bexton ward results
Party	Candidate	Votes	%	±%
Conservative	George Walton	693	72.0	
Liberal Democrats	Ann Barlow	189	19.6	
Labour	Tony Sutherland	81	8.4	
Majority		504		
Turnout		963	45.76	
Conservative hold		Swing		

Knutsford Nether ward results
Party	Candidate	Votes	%	±%
Conservative	Vivien Davies	514	66.9	
Liberal Democrats	Roger Barlow	139	18.1	
Labour	Laurie Burton	115	15.0	
Majority		375		
Turnout		768	36.51	
Conservative hold		Swing		

Knutsford Norbury Booths ward results
Party	Candidate	Votes	%	±%
Conservative	Joan Fairhurst	743	85.1	
Labour	Paul Thomson	130	14.9	
Majority		613		
Turnout		873	40.53	
Conservative hold		Swing		

Knutsford Over ward
Party	Candidate	Votes	%	±%
Conservative	Wilson Hamman	859	68.6	+11.0
Labour	Brian Daulby	394	31.4	+6.9
Majority		465		
Turnout		1,253	31.90	+0.65
Conservative hold		Swing		

Macclesfield Bollinbrook ward results
Party	Candidate	Votes	%	±%
Liberal Democrats	Ainsley Arnold	830	51.7	+8.1
Conservative	Karen Miles	611	38.1	−3.8
Labour	Christopher McDermott	163	10.2	−4.2
Majority		219		
Turnout		1,604	35.66	+3.6
Liberal Democrats hold		Swing		

Macclesfield Broken Cross ward results
Party	Candidate	Votes	%	±%
Conservative	Martin Hardy	598	47.8	+5.4
Liberal Democrats	Peter Wilcox	476	38.0	−5.6
Labour	David Pemberton	178	14.2	+0.2
Majority		122		
Turnout		1,252	29.64	+1.43
Conservative gain from Independent		Swing		

Macclesfield Central ward results
Party	Candidate	Votes	%	±%
Labour	Janet Jackson	543	46.9	+4.0
Conservative	Gillian Stratford	335	28.9	−2.0
Green	Dougal Hare	280	24.2	−1.9
Majority		208		
Turnout		1,158	25.39	+0.91
Labour hold		Swing		

Macclesfield East ward results
Party	Candidate	Votes	%	±%
Liberal Democrats	Stephen Broadhurst	677	45.3	+2.8
Conservative	Paul Cook	456	30.5	−5.1
Labour	Simon Truss	228	15.3	+1.6
Green	Lindy Brett	132	8.8	+0.7
Majority		221		
Turnout		1,493	35.38	+2.05
Liberal Democrats hold		Swing		

Macclesfield Hurdsfield ward results
Party	Candidate	Votes	%	±%
Liberal Democrats	Christine Tomlinson	458	52.8	−0.2
Conservative	Ian Davies	244	28.1	+5.7
Labour	John Evans	166	19.1	−5.5
Majority		214		
Turnout		868	25.14	+0.23
Liberal Democrats hold		Swing		

Macclesfield Ivy ward results
Party	Candidate	Votes	%	±%
Conservative	Elizabeth Gilliland	1,055	74.1	−1.0
Labour	Sandra Edwards	368	25.9	+1.0
Majority		687		
Turnout		1,423	34.81	−0.08
Conservative hold		Swing		

Macclesfield South ward results
Party	Candidate	Votes	%	±%
Labour	Brian Puddicombe	484	44.6	+0.2
Conservative	Lesley Smetham	442	40.7	+3.0
Green	Stephen Flinn	160	14.7	−3.0
Majority		42		
Turnout		1,089	25.27	+2.59
Labour hold		Swing		

Macclesfield Tytherington ward results
Party	Candidate	Votes	%	±%
Independent	James Nicholas	1,037	48.0	+2.7
Conservative	Matt Davies	995	46.1	+4.1
Labour	David Brown	127	5.9	−1.1
Majority		42		
Turnout		2,159	46.70	+6.34
Independent gain from Conservative		Swing		

Macclesfield West ward results
Party	Candidate	Votes	%	±%
Labour	Alift Harewood	573	61.3	+2.7
Conservative	Val Lipworth	361	38.7	−2.7
Majority		212		
Turnout		934	24.57	−0.05
Labour hold		Swing		

Morley & Styal ward results
Party	Candidate	Votes	%	±%
Liberal Democrats	Colin Shepherd	949	53.0	
Conservative	John Fraser	842	47.0	
Majority		107		
Turnout		1,791	47.97	
Liberal Democrats hold		Swing		

Poynton Central ward results
Party	Candidate	Votes	%	±%
Conservative	John Barber	1,152	56.9	−20.0
Liberal Democrats	Christopher James	395	19.5	+19.5
Labour	Judith Elderkin	202	10.0	−13.1
UKIP	Richard Simpson	191	9.4	+9.4
Green	John Knight	83	4.1	+4.1
Majority		757		
Turnout		2,023	35.81	+4.05
Conservative hold		Swing		
