= Ollerton, Cheshire =

Village in Cheshire, England

Coordinates: 53.287251°N 2.336489°W

Ollerton
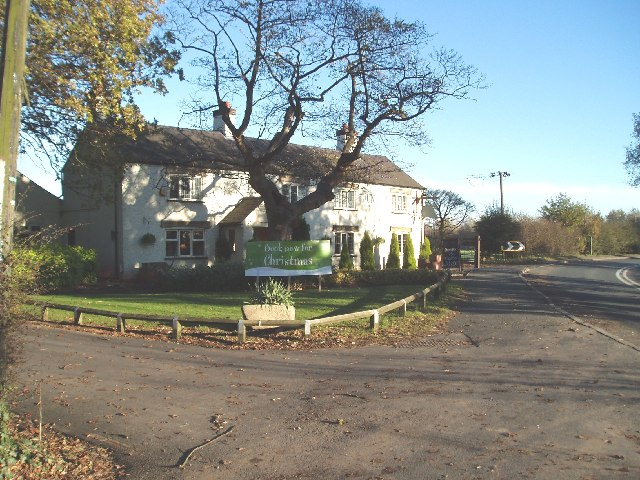
- The Dun Cow public house, Ollerton

- Location within Cheshire
- Population: 329 (2011)
- OS grid reference: SJ776767
- Civil parish: Ollerton
- Unitary authority: Cheshire East
- Ceremonial county: Cheshire
- Region: North West
- Country: England
- Sovereign state: United Kingdom
- Post town: KNUTSFORD
- Postcode district: WA16
- Dialling code: 01565
- Police: Cheshire
- Fire: Cheshire
- Ambulance: North West
- UK Parliament: Tatton

Ollerton is a village in the Borough of Cheshire East and the ceremonial county of Cheshire, England. It is approximately 2 miles (3.2 km) south east of the town of Knutsford, and had a population of 323 in 2001, rising marginally to 329 at the 2011 Census.

Local services are limited, and include a church in the adjacent village of Marthall, a pub and several postboxes. Other services such as the primary school, post office and shop have closed down, residents instead using services in Knutsford. Ollerton has a joint parish council with Marthall, elected every 3 years. The villages share the new village hall in Marthall, which was constructed in November 2009.

Ollerton is thought to have come from the name Owlerton and is named in the Domesday Book of 1086.

== See also ==
- Listed buildings in Ollerton, Cheshire
