= Astle Hall =

Former country house in Cheshire, England

Coordinates: 53.2613°N 2.2818°W

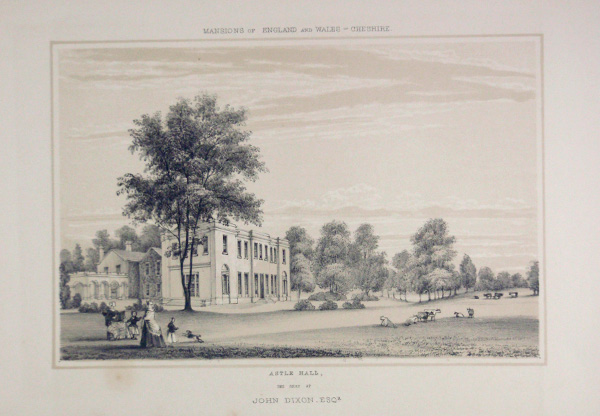
Lithograph of Astle Hall (1850)

Astle Hall is a former country house located near Chelford, Cheshire in the North West of England. The hall has been demolished; its parkland and a lodge survive.

== History ==
The hall was built in the middle of the 18th century by John Parker, Esq, on the site of old Milne House. Earwaker describes "a large, roomy house, situated in a well-wooded park, the beauties of which are considerably enhanced by a large sheet of water which borders it on one side".

It was described by George Ormerod in his 1819 history of the county: "Astle Hall, which has been much enlarged and improved by the present proprietor, is a handsome and spacious edifice situated amongst extensive and well-timbered grounds. At a short distance from the house is a large artificial piece of water, which assumes from its extent and variety of outline the appearance of a natural lake."

John Dixon esq of Gledhow Hall and Weeting married Lydia, daughter of John Parker, in 1784 and passed to his grandson, Colonel Sir George Dixon (1842–1924), created 1st Baronet in 1919. He was succeeded by the Dixon Baronets of Astle, still extant.

The hall originally had a symmetrical Neo-classical design, which is recorded in artworks and photographs. By 1988, this had been reduced to a painted brick wing of three storeys with gables, which the architectural writers Peter de Figueiredo and Julian Treuherz speculate might have represented the former hall's service wing, based on its lack of resemblance to pictures. It was left derelict and was demolished towards the end of the 20th century.

== Lodge ==
The lodge to the hall still stands. It dates from the late 18th to early 19th century, and is in cottage orné style. It is described as "picturesque" by Nikolaus Pevsner and coauthors and as "pretty" by de Figueiredo and Treuherz; Historic England describes it as a "well preserved example of a Picturesque Lodge". It is constructed in brick with a stone-slate roof. It has two storeys, and an entrance front of three bays. The central bay projects forward, and contains a four-light window with interlacing tracery. The lateral bays contain two-light windows with Y-tracery. In front of the house is a verandah supported by tree trunks, and containing a gabled dormer. The building is listed at grade II*.

== Park ==
The hall's park still survives; it is flat and features a woodland garden, and the remnants of formal gardens and a kitchen garden. There is a lake with a grade-II-listed semicircular weir or dam dating from around 1874. The lake and the kitchen garden date from between 1769 and 1799. The landscaper was John Webb.

== See also ==
- Listed buildings in Chelford
- Listed buildings in Snelson, Cheshire
