= Listed buildings in Snelson, Cheshire =

Snelson is a former civil parish in Cheshire East, England. It contained two buildings that are recorded in the National Heritage List for England as designated listed buildings, both of which are listed at Grade II. This grade is the lowest of the three gradings given to listed buildings and is applied to "buildings of national importance and special interest". The parish was entirely rural, its listed buildings consisting of a house and a weir associated with a country house.

Name and location	Photograph	Date	Notes
Rosebank Cottage; 53.26129°N 2.28730°W	—	Early to mid 18th century	A brick house with roofs of slate and stone-slate in two storeys. Most of the windows are casements, and there are two sash windows on the garden front. The oak door dates from the 17th century, and was moved here from Withington Hall in the 19th century, and cut to fit. It contains a carved panel depicting two mermen with entwined tails holding tridents.
Weir, Astle Hall; 53.26206°N 2.28305°W	—	Late 19th century	The weir is built in stone and brick, and has stone dressings. The weir pool is semicircular, as is the water fall wall. Opposite is a straight brick wall containing four drainage holes, and there is a similar brick wall, also with four drainage holes, at the side of the bridge. Between these walls are buttresses.
