= Holy Trinity Chapel, Capesthorne =

Coordinates: 53.2513°N 2.2411°W

- Location in Cheshire
- OS grid reference: SJ 840 727
- Location: Capesthorne Hall, Siddington, Cheshire
- Country: England
- Denomination: Anglican
- Website: Holy Trinity, Capesthorne

History
- Status: Private chapel
- Dedication: Trinity
- Consecrated: 1722

Architecture
- Heritage designation: Grade II*
- Designated: 14 April 1967
- Architect: John Ward
- Architectural type: Chapel
- Style: Neoclassical
- Completed: 1888

Specifications
- Materials: Red brick with stone dressings Slate roof

Administration
- Province: York
- Diocese: Chester
- Archdeaconry: Macclesfield
- Deanery: Macclesfield
- Parish: All Saints, Siddington

Holy Trinity Chapel is a private chapel adjacent to Capesthorne Hall, near the village of Siddington, Cheshire, England. It is recorded in the National Heritage List for England as a designated Grade II* listed building. It is an Anglican church in the diocese of Chester, the archdeaconry of Macclesfield and the deanery of Macclesfield. Its benefice is combined with those of St James and St Paul, Marton, Christ Church, Eaton, and All Saints, Siddington.

== History ==
The chapel was built in 1722 to a design by John Ward in neoclassical style and restored in 1886–88 by Mrs Augusta Bromley Davenport. The restoration led to the interior becoming much more ornate.

== Architecture ==
=== Exterior ===
The chapel is constructed in red brick with stone dressings and a slate roof. It consists of a nave with an apsidal chancel. Around the top of the chapel is a moulded stone cornice and a balustrade. The balusters are interspersed with square piers supporting swagged ball finials.

=== Interior ===
The manorial pew is on a raised platform at the west end; it is reached by a private door from the park grounds. During the restoration the box pews were removed, the pulpit was moved, the wall panelling was raised in height and a panelled ceiling was added. A mosaic reredos was added in the apse, which was manufactured by Salviati and is loosely based on Giotto's Dormition. The font dates from 1772, is made of coloured marble and consists of a bowl resting on three legs, each with a clawed foot. The vaults contain the remains of John Ward, the builder, and members of the Bromley Davenport family.

== External features ==
The gatepiers and gates to the chapel are listed at Grade II. The gates are of wrought iron and date from around 1750. They are of Milanese Rococo style and include statues of Saint Andrew. The square piers are from the 20th century and are built of brick on a stone plinth. On their tops are stepped stone caps with ball finials.

== See also ==
- Grade II* listed buildings in Cheshire East
- Listed buildings in Siddington, Cheshire
