= Listed buildings in Marton, Cheshire =

Marton is a civil parish in Cheshire East, England. It contains ten buildings that are recorded in the National Heritage List for England as designated listed buildings. Of these, one is listed at Grade I, the highest grade, and the others are at Grade II, the lowest grade. Apart from the village of Marton, the parish is rural. The listed buildings comprise a church with a cross in the churchyard, farmhouses and dwellings.

== Key ==
Grade	Criteria
I	Buildings of exceptional interest, sometimes considered to be internationally important
II	Buildings of national importance and special interest

== Buildings ==
Name and location	Photograph	Date	Notes	Grade
St James' and St Paul's Church; 53.20880°N 2.22577°W		c. 1370	The church is timber-framed with rendered brick infill, a brick east end, and a slate roof. Alterations have been carried out at various times, including restorations by J. M. Derick in 1850 and William Butterfield in 1871. The church has a nave with aisles, a chancel with chapels, and a south porch. At the west end is a shingled tower with a shingled broach spire surmounted by a weather cock. The tower is surrounded by lean-to roofed aisles on the north, west and south sides.	I
Churchyard Cross, St James' and St Paul's Church; 53.20871°N 2.22560°W		14th or 15th century	The churchyard cross is in stone. It has a square stepped base and a square stepped plinth. Standing on this is a shaft, square at the base and becoming octagonal in the upper part. The cross is also a scheduled monument.	II
Gorsley Green Farmhouse; 53.21521°N 2.23879°W	—	17th century	A brick farmhouse with stone dressings and a slate roof. It is in two storeys, and has an L-shaped plan. On the north front is a projecting wing with camber-headed windows.	II
Holly Bank Farm; 53.21908°N 2.22311°W		Mid-17th century	Additions and alterations were made in the 19th century to this timber-framed farmhouse. It has whitewashed brick infill, it stands on a stone plinth, and has a tiled roof. Most of the windows are casements, and there is also a two-light staircase window, and three-light gabled dormers.	II
Oak Farm; 53.21135°N 2.22295°W		Mid-17th century	A farmhouse that has been altered and extended. It is timber-framed with brick infill on a stone plinth, and has a slate roof. The house has an H-shaped plan, and is in two storeys.	II
Cherry Tree Cottage; 53.21147°N 2.22898°W		Mid- to late 17th century	A timber-framed cottage with brick infill on a stone plinth, and with a tiled roof. It is in two storeys. The windows are casements.	II
Greenacres; 53.21206°N 2.22632°W		Mid- to late 17th century	Originally a farmhouse, it was later altered and extended. The house is timber-framed with whitewashed brick infill on a brick plinth, and it has a slate roof. It is in a single storey with an attic, and has dormers in the attic. At the rear are two 20th-century bow windows.	II
Lower Marton Farmhouse; 53.21186°N 2.25066°W	—	Mid- to late 17th century	The farmhouse is partly timber-framed with rendered brick infill, and partly in brick, some of which is painted to resemble timber framing. It has a stone-slate roof. The house stands on a rendered plinth and is in two storeys. There is a 20th-century extension to the right.	II
Oak Cottage; 53.21140°N 2.22374°W		Mid- to late 17th century	The cottage is built in brick, and has a thatched roof. It has a front of three bays. The windows are casements, and there is a swept dormer window.	II
Pump Cottage; 53.21091°N 2.22567°W		Late 17th to early 18th century	The cottage is timber-framed with whitewashed brick infill, and in brick painted to resemble timber framing. The cottage has a thatched roof. It is in two storeys, with a two-bay front. The windows are casements.	II

== See also ==
- Listed buildings in Eaton
- Listed buildings in Gawsworth
- Listed buildings in Hulme Walfield
- Listed buildings in Lower Withington
- Listed buildings in North Rode
- Listed buildings in Siddington
- Listed buildings in Somerford Booths
- Listed buildings in Swettenham
