= All Saints Church, Siddington =

Coordinates: 53.2343°N 2.2317°W

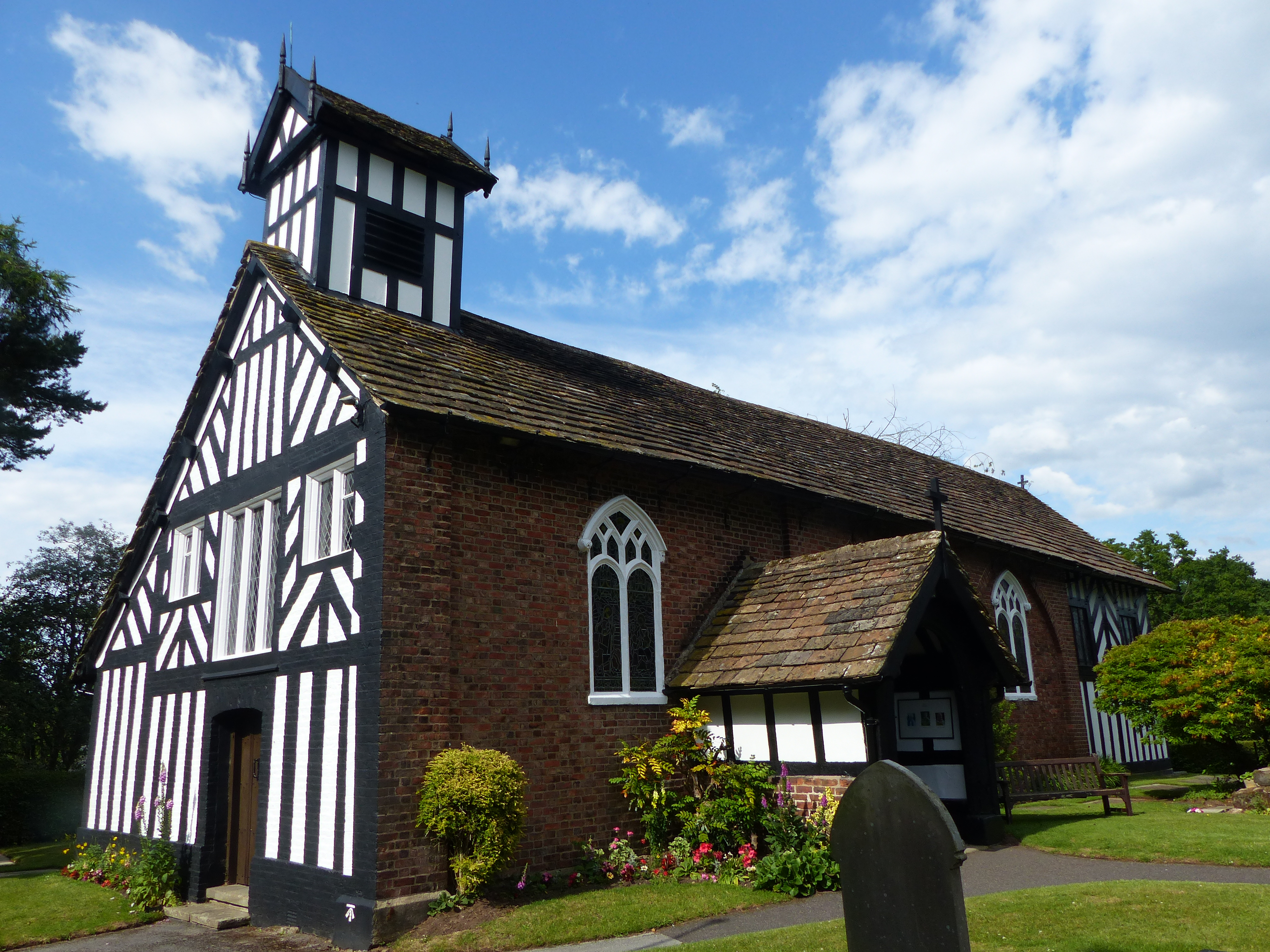
- All Saints Church, Siddington

- Location in Cheshire
- OS grid reference: SJ 845 708
- Location: Siddington, Cheshire
- Country: England
- Denomination: Anglican
- Website: All Saints, Siddington

History
- Status: Parish church
- Dedication: All Saints
- Consecrated: 1521

Architecture
- Functional status: Active
- Heritage designation: Grade II*
- Designated: 14 April 1967
- Architectural type: Church
- Completed: 1894

Specifications
- Materials: Timber framing enclosed in brick Kerridge stone-slate roof

Administration
- Province: York
- Diocese: Chester
- Archdeaconry: Macclesfield
- Deanery: Congleton
- Parish: All Saints, Siddington

Clergy
- Vicar: The Revd Jim Cartlidge

All Saints Church is in the village of Siddington, Cheshire, England. The church is recorded in the National Heritage List for England as a designated Grade II* listed building. It is an active Anglican parish church in the diocese of Chester, the archdeaconry of Macclesfield and the deanery of Macclesfield. It is the Parish Church of Siddington with Capesthorne, which includes Holy Trinity, Capesthorne, and Christ Church, Eaton, and is part of the benefice of Marton, Siddington with Capesthorne and Eaton with Hulme Walfield.

== History ==
There are records of a chapel at Siddington in 1337 and again in 1474. It was consecrated for preaching in 1521. It was originally a timber-framed building. By 1815 the walls were bulging and the timber-framing was strengthened by being enclosed in brick. Restorations were carried out in 1853 and 1894.

== Architecture ==
=== Exterior ===
The chancel and the south porch retain the original timber-framing. The west wall is painted to appear like timber-framing. The roof is of Kerridge stone slates. The plan of the church consists of a four-bay nave and a two-bay chancel, with a vestry projecting from its north wall, and a south porch. At the west end is a gabled bellcote.

=== Interior ===
The wooden roofs of the nave and chancel are well preserved, and the nave and chancel are separated by a 14th-century wooden screen. The chancel walls consist of the original timber-framing while the brickwork of the nave is painted to simulate it. All the church fittings are relatively new other than the pulpit which dates from 1633. The gallery at the west end was erected in 1786. The parish registers begin in 1722 and the churchwardens' accounts in 1781. All the church plate was stolen in 1792 and never recovered. A new set was given to the church in 1936 by the Bromley-Davenport family.

== External features ==
In the churchyard are graves of the Bromley-Davenport family from nearby Capesthorne Hall. Also in the churchyard is a 16th-century cross base which has been listed at Grade II. In addition the churchyard contains the war graves of a Tank Corps soldier and two Royal Air Force officers of World War I.

== Memorials ==
There is a memorial to Lieutenant Colonel Wilfrith Elstob VC DSO MC (1888–1918), recipient of the Victoria Cross in World War I, whose father was Vicar of All Saints.

== See also ==
- Grade II* listed buildings in Cheshire East
- Listed buildings in Siddington, Cheshire
