= St Michael's Church, Hulme Walfield =

Coordinates: 53.1821°N 2.2320°W

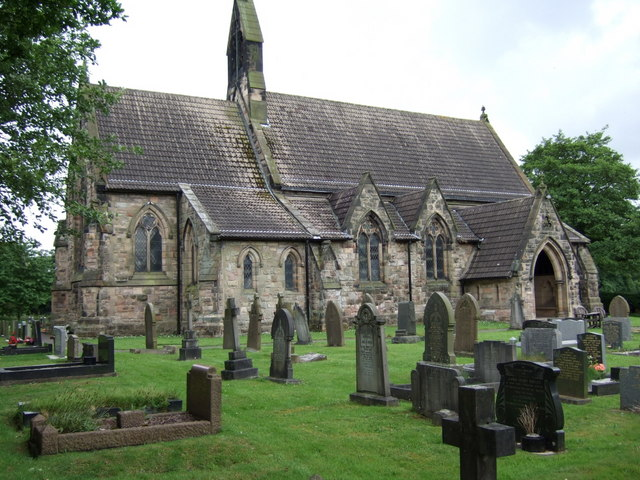
- St Michael's Church, Hulme Walfield, from the north

- Location in Cheshire
- OS grid reference: SJ 846 650
- Location: Giantswood Lane, Hulme Walfield, Cheshire
- Country: England
- Denomination: Anglican
- Website: St Michael, Hulme Walfield

History
- Status: Parish church
- Dedication: Saint Michael

Architecture
- Functional status: Active
- Heritage designation: Grade II
- Designated: 26 March 1987
- Architect: George Gilbert Scott
- Architectural type: Church
- Style: Gothic Revival
- Groundbreaking: 1855
- Completed: 1856

Specifications
- Materials: Sandstone, pantile roof

Administration
- Province: York
- Diocese: Chester
- Archdeaconry: Macclesfield
- Deanery: Congleton

Clergy
- Vicar: Revd Jim Cartlidge

St Michael's Church is in Giantswood Lane, Hulme Walfield, Cheshire, England. It is an active Anglican parish church in the deanery of Congleton, the archdeaconry of Macclesfield, and the diocese of Chester. The church is recorded in the National Heritage List for England as a designated Grade II listed building. The authors of the Buildings of England series comment that it is "an attractive building, and one for which money must have been spent generously".

== History ==
St Michael's was built in 1855–56, and designed by George Gilbert Scott. It was originally a chapel of ease to St Mary, Astbury, and became a parish in its own right in 1878.

== Architecture ==
The church is constructed in sandstone, and has a 20th-century pantile roof. Its plan consists of a four-bay nave, a north aisle, a northwest porch, a chancel, a southeast vestry, and a northeast organ chamber. On the east gable of the nave is a double bellcote. The porch projects from the second bay on the north side, and has a cross finial on the apex of its gable. Inside the porch are stone benches, and the side walls contain embrasures. In the other bays are two-light windows with trefoil heads containing Geometric tracery. The organ chamber has two lancet windows on the north side, and a two-light window on the east side. The north wall of the chancel also contains a two-light window. The east window has three lights, above which is a canopied niche. Each of the four bays on the south side of the church contains a two-light window with a trefoil head. At the west end are two more two-light windows.

Inside the church, between the nave and the aisle, is a four-bay arcade carried on circular piers with foliate capitals. The chancel arch is richly moulded. The octagonal font dates from the 16th century, and is decorated with blind tracery. The organ was built at an unknown date by Young.

== Churchyard ==
The churchyard contains the war graves of a soldier of World War I, and another of World War II.

== See also ==
- List of new churches by George Gilbert Scott in Northern England
- Listed buildings in Hulme Walfield
