= Siddington =

Siddington may refer to:

- Siddington, Cheshire, England
- Siddington, Gloucestershire, England
