= Listed buildings in Hulme Walfield =

Hulme Walfield is a civil parish in Cheshire East, England. It contains three buildings that are recorded in the National Heritage List for England as designated listed buildings, all of which are at Grade II. This grade is the lowest of the three gradings given to listed buildings and is applied to "buildings of national importance and special interest". The parish is almost entirely rural, and the listed buildings consist of two farmhouses and a church.

Name and location	Photograph	Date	Notes
Hulme Walfield Hall; 53.18611°N 2.22899°W	—	17th century	A brick farmhouse with a tiled roof that was expanded in the 18th century. It is in three storeys, and has a three-bay front. The doorway is flanked by Tuscan pillars carrying an open pediment containing a fanlight. The windows are sashes with wedge lintels and moulded keystones. The 17th-century wing is to the rear.
Brick House Farmhouse; 53.18419°N 2.22283°W		Mid- to late 18th century	The farmhouse is in brick with a slate roof. It is in three storeys, and has a symmetrical three-bay front. In the centre is a round-arched doorway with a keystone and a fanlight. The windows are casements.
St Michael's Church; 53.18205°N 2.23202°W		1855–56	The church was designed by George Gilbert Scott and is built in sandstone. It consists of a nave, a north aisle, a northwest porch, a chancel, a southeast vestry, and a northeast organ chamber. On the east gable of the nave is a double bellcote. The windows contain Geometrical tracery. Inside the church is a 16th-century font.

== See also ==
- Listed buildings in Congleton
- Listed buildings in Eaton
- Listed buildings in Marton
- Listed buildings in Somerford
- Listed buildings in Somerford Booths
