= William Whaley =

English slave trader

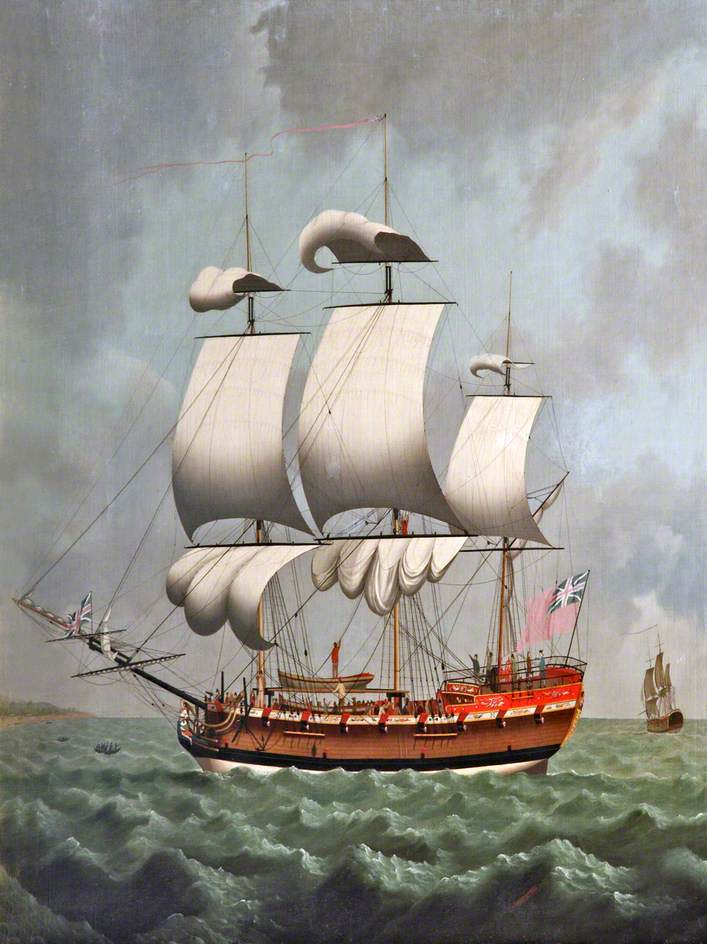
A Liverpool slave ship

William Whaley (died circa 1765) was an English slave trader. He was involved in at least 22 slave voyages from the Port of Liverpool, and was one of the biggest slave traders in British America. He employed two of the biggest slave traders, William Davenport and William Earle, before they became slave traders.

== Slave trade ==
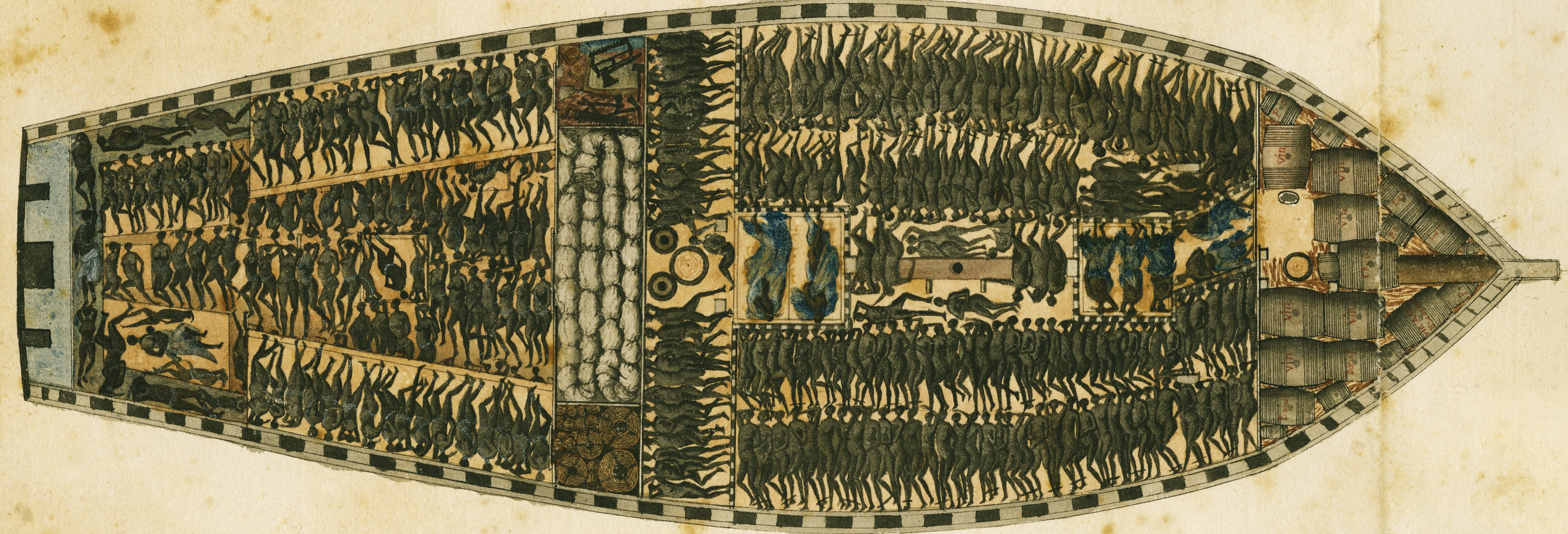
A painting of the slave deck of a slave ship, showing shackled Africans

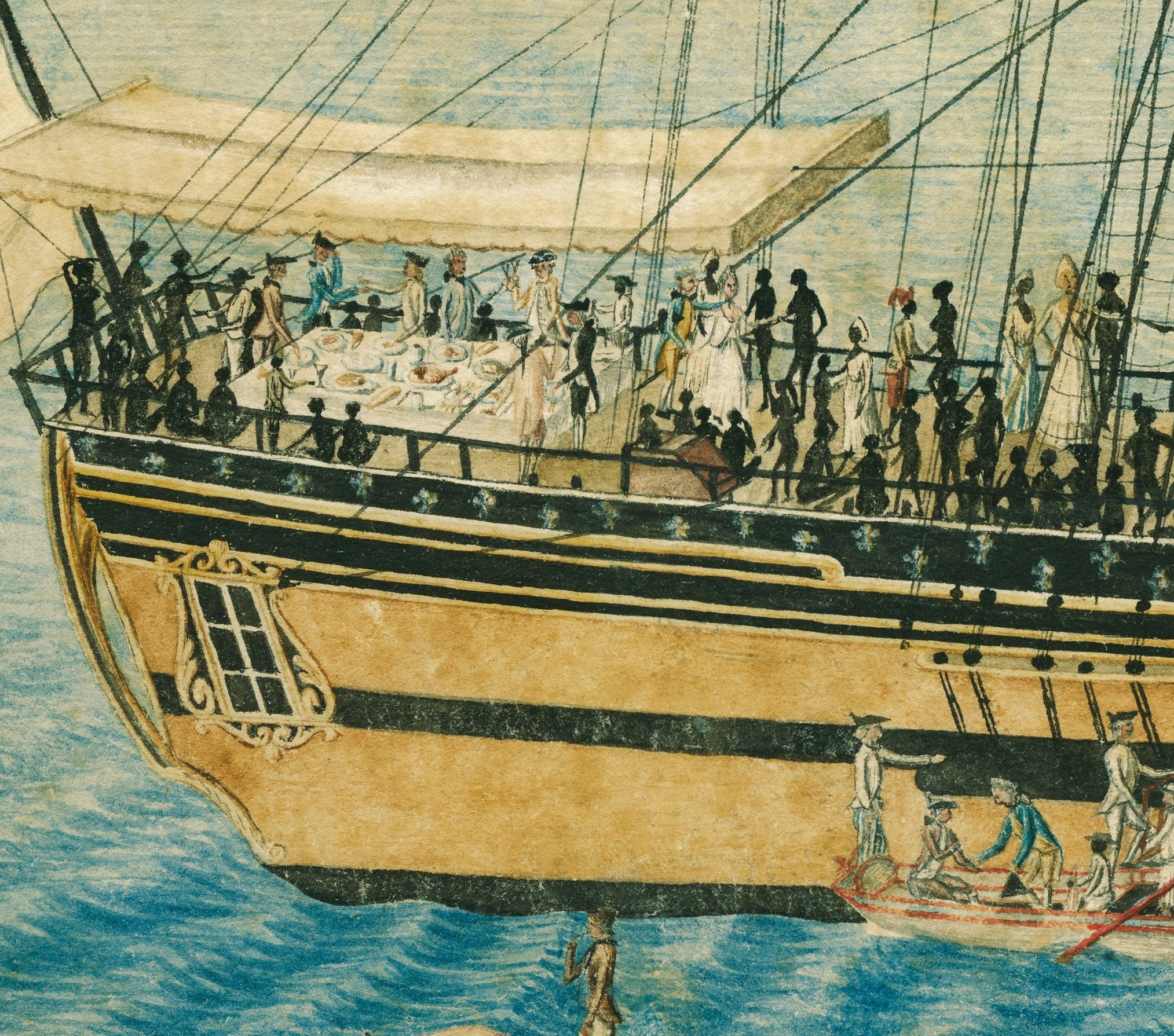
Detail of a contemporary painting showing the sale of enslaved people aboard a slave ship

Whaley was involved in at least 22 slave voyages in the years between 1750 and 1759 from the Port of Liverpool.

Whaley sold luxury goods to, and maintained a connection with John Ward the owner of Capesthorne Hall. In 1741, John Ward sent his grandson William Davenport to Liverpool to work as an apprentice for Whaley. Davenport worked for Whaley as a grocer and in the African trades for 7 years. Whaley was paid £120 to take Davenport as his apprentice, with an additional annual fee of £25. For the period, the fees paid would be very large, which indicates that Whaley's firm offered a substantial education. Upon completion of the apprenticeship Whaley and Davenport became partners in slave voyages, between 1748 and 1753 they were involved in eight slave voyages. Whaley and Davenport pioneered the creation of Old Calabar as a slaving station. Davenport subsequently became, by the number of slave voyages completed, Britain's biggest slave trader.

Whaley employed William Earle as a slave ship captain. Earle subsequently went on to become one of the biggest slave traders from the Port of Liverpool. In March 1750, Earle captained a ship called the Chesterfield owned by a Whaley, Davenport and a number of others. A letter detailing the instructions given by Whaley, Davenport et al. to Earle on Chesterfield has been preserved. The letter is dated 22 May 1751 and instructs Earle to leave Liverpool and proceed to Douglas on the Isle of Mann to purchase goods to be traded for African people and elephant teeth. From there he was to sail Old Calabar and buy 350 people. The letter gives Earle 5 prestige, by this it was meant in addition to his wages Earle could choose 5 people who when sold would benefit him alone. He was then instructed to sail to the Caribbean where the slaves were to be sold. Thereafter he was told to buy goods for the return trip, with those goods to be sold in Bristol or London. An addendum to the letter signed by Whaley instructs Earle to buy as many elephant teeth as he can, even if that meant he did not buy the full complement of 350 slaves.

Whaley participated in the Chesapeake slave trade, transporting Africans to Chesapeake Bay, in what would become the United States of America. Whaley transported 866 people with 5 slave voyages, this made him the 7th biggest importer of enslaved people in the first half of the 18th century. After 1750 the British slave trade became more focussed on the West Indies and South Carolina. Whaley regularly sold people to Henry Laurens in South Carolina. Laurens was an American Revolutionary War politician and also one of the biggest slave traders and slave owners in British America.

== Slave ships ==
Whaley owned and invested in a number of slave ships. They included Chesterfield, Ann Gally and St. George.

== Personal life ==
Whaley lived at Upholland and also Eccleston, both in Lancashire. He died circa 1765.

== Sources ==
- Earle, Peter (2015). The Earles of Liverpool. Liverpool, UK: Liverpool University Press.
- Richardson, David (2007). Liverpool and Transatlantic Slavery. UK: Liverpool University Press. ISBN 978-1-84631-066-9.
