= St James' and St Paul's Church, Marton =

Coordinates: 53.2088°N 2.2257°W

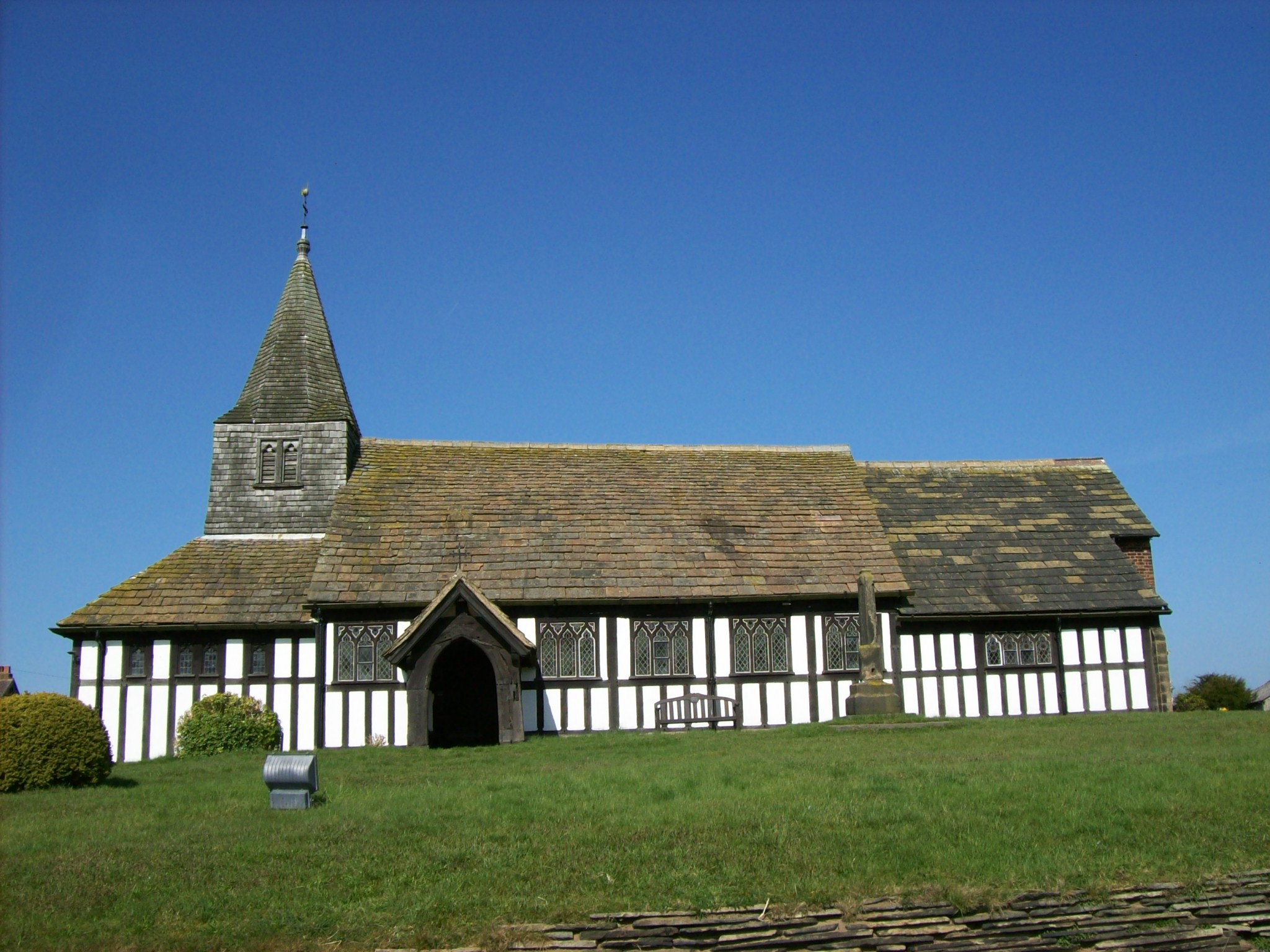
- St James' and St Paul's Church, Marton, from the south

- Location in Cheshire
- OS grid reference: SJ 849 680
- Location: Marton, Cheshire
- Country: England
- Denomination: Anglican
- Website: Marton, St James and St Paul

History
- Status: Parish church

Architecture
- Functional status: Active
- Heritage designation: Grade I
- Designated: 14 April 1967
- Architect(s): J. M. Derick, William Butterfield
- Architectural type: Church

Specifications
- Materials: Timber framing, rendered brick infill, slate roof

Administration
- Province: York
- Diocese: Chester
- Archdeaconry: Macclesfield
- Deanery: Congleton
- Parish: Marton

The Church of St James and St Paul, south of the village of Marton, Cheshire, England, is now an Anglican church, first founded in the 14th century. It is recorded in the National Heritage List for England as a designated Grade I listed building. It is an active parish church in the Diocese of Chester, the Archdeaconry of Macclesfield and the Deanery of Congleton. Its benefice is combined with those of Holy Trinity, Capesthorne, Christ Church, Eaton, and All Saints, Siddington. The church is an important location in the novel Strandloper by Alan Garner.

The church differs from the majority of churches in Cheshire in that its body is timber-framed. It is one of the oldest timber-framed churches in Europe. Only a handful of churches of this type remain in England; other surviving examples include churches at Lower Peover and Baddiley (Cheshire), Melverley (Shropshire), Besford (Worcestershire) and Hartley Wespall (Hampshire).

== History ==
The church was founded and endowed in 1343 by Sir John de Davenport and his son Vivian. Further land was donated by the family in 1370. The belfry was added subsequently; it dates from around 1540. The roof was lowered in 1804.

Restorations were carried out by J. M. Derick in 1850 and William Butterfield in 1871. Derick replaced two-light windows with windows of three lights. Butterfield tidied some of the timbers in the tower. At that time, the existing entrance at the west end was also added. Further restoration was carried out in 1930–31, including renewal of some wall panels, rafters and belfry shingles. A brick extension to the chancel was constructed in the 20th century.

== Architecture ==
=== Exterior ===
The timber frame features close studding with a middle rail. It rests on a stone plinth, the infill is rendered brick and the roof is of slate. At the west end is a shingled square tower with a shingled broach spire ending in a weather cock. This is surrounded by lean-to roofed aisles on the north, west and south sides. The tower has a western arched door with a 20th-century door which incorporates 17th-century iron strap hinges. The body of the church consists of a three-bay nave with north and south aisles, a two-bay chancel and north and south chapels at the ends of the aisles, and a south porch. The former Principal Historic Buildings Officer for Cheshire County Council described the exterior as "disappointing" and considered that 19th-century alterations "have tended to detract from its external medieval appearance", but noted that "internally it has a great deal of character and interest."

=== Interior ===
The timber piers are octagonal in shape. Two damaged stone effigies of 14th-century knights are in the belfry; the heads rest on the Davenport crest, suggesting the figures might depict the church's founders, John and Vivian de Davenport. The pulpit carries a coat of arms and dates from 1620. There are three surviving bells, the oldest being inscribed 'God Save the Queen and Realme 1598'. Other features include an Elizabethan parish chest and an ancient handmade wooden ladder accessing the bell-ringing platform. The organ was built in 1894 by A. Worral. The ring consists of six bells, three of which are dated 1598, 1663 and 1758. The parish registers begin in 1563.

Inside the church are traces of some early medieval paintings on the west wall, which were discovered under plaster in 1930. The painting, which probably represents the Last Judgement (a common subject of medieval church paintings), is divided into sections by the timbering. A haloed male figure with long yellow hair at the top right possibly represents Christ, and a haloed kneeling female figure opposite might represent the Virgin Mary. The bottom left panel contains figures with raised hands mainly looking towards the viewer; these possibly represent souls under judgement. Other figures carry items, perhaps instruments of the Passion. Also in the church is an 18th-century oil painting by Edward Penney of Moses and Aaron holding the Ten Commandments.

== External features ==
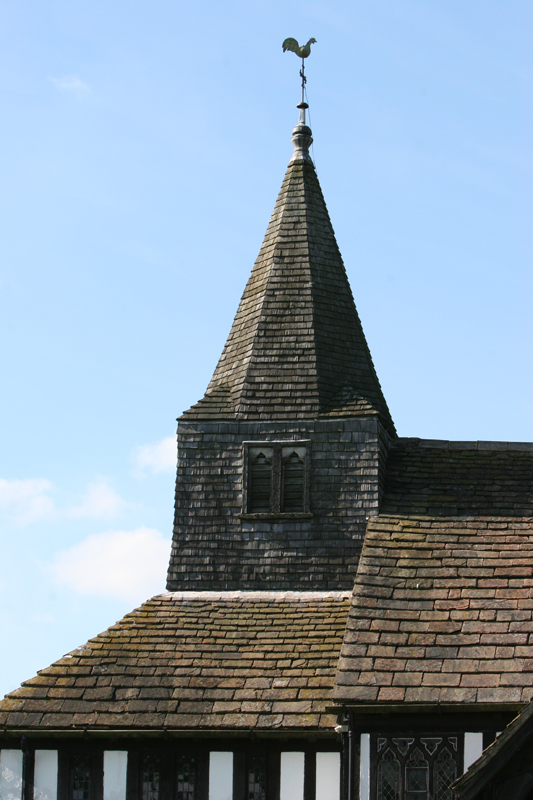
Square Tower

In the churchyard is a cross dating from the 14th or 15th century which has been subsequently restored. It is listed Grade II. The churchyard also contains the war graves of two soldiers of World War I.

== See also ==
- Grade I listed buildings in Cheshire East
- Grade I listed churches in Cheshire
- Listed buildings in Marton, Cheshire
