= William Davenport (slave trader) =

English slave trader

William Davenport (8 October 1725 – 1794) was a British slave trader who was, by the number of ships disembarked, the single most prolific slave trader from the Port of Liverpool. He took part in 163 slaving voyages and his slave ships carried almost 40,000 enslaved Africans.

== Early life ==
William Davenport was born on 8 October 1725 in London. His wider family were part of the landed gentry and in 1726 they inherited the stately home Capesthorne Hall, Siddington, Cheshire, which at that time was under construction. In the late 1730s Davenport took up residence with his maternal grandfather, John Ward, at Capesthorne Hall. Ward had a connection with William Whaley, a Liverpool slave trader, and when Davenport was old enough he was sent to work as Whaley's apprentice in Liverpool.

== Slave trade ==
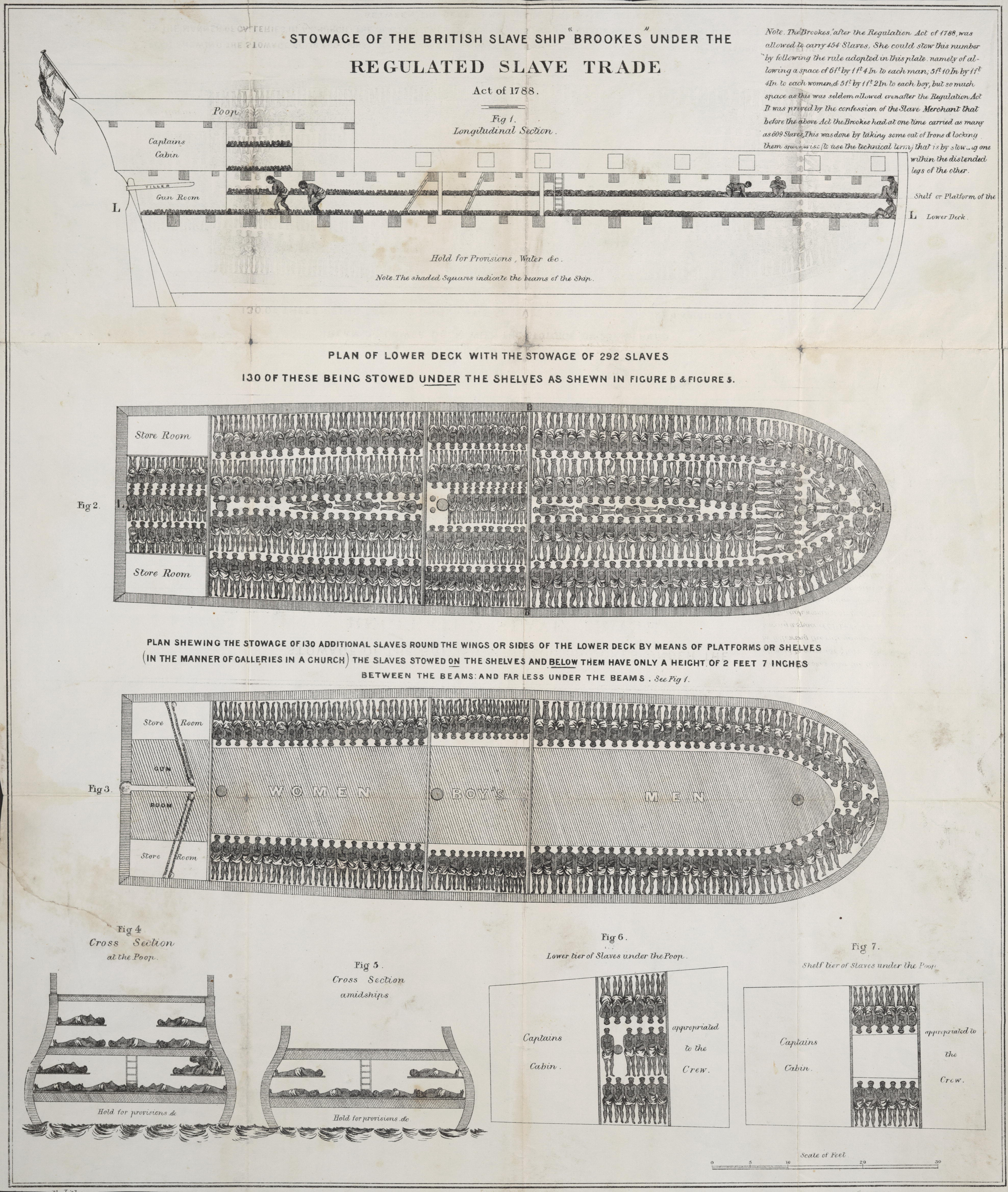
The slave ship Brooks, showing how slaves were shackled on board

Davenport was one of the world's most prolific traders in enslaved people, and by the number of ships disembarked, the single most prolific slave trader from the Port of Liverpool. He took part in 163 slaving voyages and his slave ships carried almost 40,000 enslaved Africans. Davenport opened new markets; he sold enslaved people in Tobago, St. Vincent, Grenada and Dominica, islands that were ceded to the British from the French in 1763. He took many of his captives from Old Calabar, Gabon and Cameroon, much further eastwards along the African coast than his contemporaries. He pioneered the Liverpool to Old Calabar route. He took almost three quarters of all enslaved people from Cameroon and he participated in the Chesapeake slave trade, transporting enslaved people to North America.

=== Retirement ===
Davenport was a lifelong bachelor; most Liverpool slave traders used marriage to cement commercial ties with other slave trading families in the city. He shunned not only public life but also the slave trade associations attended by other slavers. He retired in mid-1786 at the same time that pamphlets began circulating in the city demonstrating the evil of the industry. Davenport did not state why he chose to retire at that time; however, he was aware of the growing campaign for abolition because his younger brother, Thomas Davenport, had been a lawyer in the Zong massacre court cases. Radburn (Note: Nicholas Radburn is lecturer of the Atlantic World 1500-1800 at Lancaster University) speculates that Davenport wanted to avoid wider public scrutiny and the slurs against his character that remaining a slave trader would have entailed.

== Archives of William Davenport ==
The bulk of the surviving archives of William Davenport are two large tranches. The first were part of the Davies Davenport Collection at Manchester's John Rylands Library (later moved to the Raymond Richards Collection at Keele University Library). These archives contain accounts and highly detailed trading information for nearly 80 slave voyages in the period 1761 to 1784.

During the 1950s a farm worker discovered a set of merchant's papers formerly belonging to Davenport in a Cheshire barn. The papers came to light in October 2000 during an episode of the Antiques Roadshow: they comprise 12 leather-bound volumes and 13 bundles of letters.

The combined archives contain more information than is known from every other Liverpool slave trader put together.

The archives include the names of the other slave traders involved, the cost of refitting ships, the age and gender of enslaved people transported, and the agents who bought and sold them. In 2006, the archives were purchased by the Merseyside Maritime Museum for the sum of £25,000 and made available to the public.

== Sources ==
- Richardson, David (2007). Liverpool and Transatlantic Slavery. UK: Liverpool University Press. ISBN 978-1-84631-066-9.
- Kachur, Matthew (2006). Slavery in the Americas: The Slave Trade. New York: Chelsea House. ISBN 0-8160-6134-3.
- Radburn, Nicholas James (2009). William Davenport, the Slave Trade, and Merchant Enterprise in Eighteenth-Century Liverpool (PDF) (MA). Victoria University of Wellington.
