= Eaton, Cheshire East =

Coordinates: 53.185°N 2.195°W

Eaton
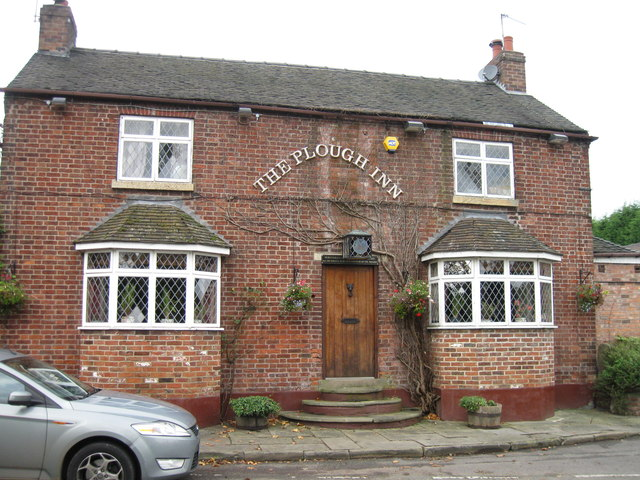
- The Plough Inn public house, Eaton

- Location within Cheshire
- Population: 289
- OS grid reference: SJ870654
- Civil parish: Eaton
- Unitary authority: Cheshire East
- Ceremonial county: Cheshire
- Region: North West
- Country: England
- Sovereign state: United Kingdom
- Post town: CONGLETON
- Postcode district: CW12
- Dialling code: 01260
- Police: Cheshire
- Fire: Cheshire
- Ambulance: North West
- UK Parliament: Macclesfield

Eaton is a village and civil parish in the unitary authority of Cheshire East and the ceremonial county of Cheshire, England. According to the 2001 census, the population of the civil parish was 289. Congleton is the nearest large town. Buses serve the Village Monday to Saturday.

== See also ==
- Listed buildings in Eaton, Cheshire East
- Christ Church, Eaton
