= Somerford Booths =

Civil parish in Cheshire, England

Coordinates: 53.183°N 2.250°W

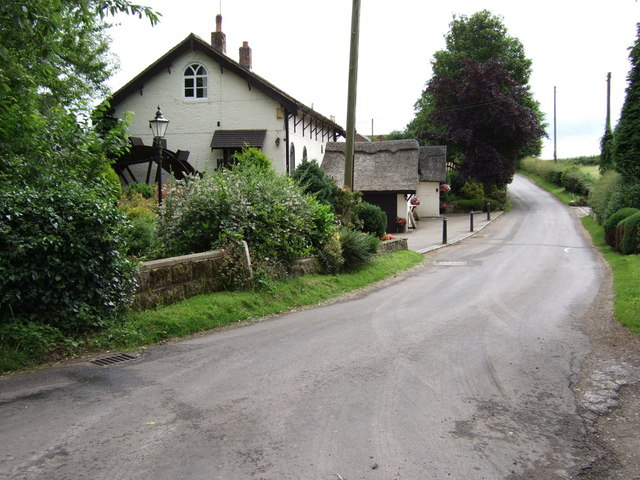
- Water mill, Somerford Booths

- Location within Cheshire
- Population: 175 (2001)
- OS grid reference: SJ832651
- Civil parish: Somerford Booths
- Unitary authority: Cheshire East
- Ceremonial county: Cheshire
- Region: North West
- Country: England
- Sovereign state: United Kingdom
- Post town: CONGLETON
- Postcode district: CW12
- Dialling code: 01260
- Police: Cheshire
- Fire: Cheshire
- Ambulance: North West
- UK Parliament: Congleton

Somerford Booths is a small civil parish in the unitary authority of Cheshire East and the ceremonial county of Cheshire, England. In the census of 2001 it was recorded as having a population of 175. increasing to 181 at the 2011 Census. The civil parish holds a parish council meeting under a grouping scheme with the civil parish of Hulme Walfield, and so it is consequently called Hulme Walfield & Somerford Booths Parish Council. The parish is small and now consists of scattered farms and small groupings of houses, including the hamlet of Newsbank. It contains Somerford Booths Hall as well as Grove House Farm and Broomfield Farm which are shown as ancient buildings on the Ordnance Survey map of the area.

== See also ==
- Listed buildings in Somerford Booths
