= Earl of Chesterfield (1781 EIC ship) =

History

Great Britain
- Name: Earl of Chesterfield
- Namesake: Earl of Chesterfield
- Owner: Thomas Newte
- Operator: British East India Company
- Builder: Perry, Blackwall
- Launched: 13 March 1781
- Fate: Sold for breaking up 1794

General characteristics
- Tons burthen: 810, or 81058/94 (bm)
- Length: Overall:143 ft 4 1/4 in (43.7 m); Keel:115 ft 8 1/2 in (35.3 m)
- Beam: 36 ft 3 1/2 in (11.1 m)
- Depth of hold: 15 ft 1 in (4.6 m)

Earl of Chesterfield was launched in 1781 as an East Indiaman. She made four voyages for the British East India Company (EIC) before she was sold in 1794 for breaking up.

== Career ==
1st EIC voyage (1781–1786): Captain Bruce Boswell sailed from Plymouth on 26 June 1781, bound for Madras, Bengal, Bombay, and China. Earl of Chesterfield reached St Helena on 18 November, and arrived at Madras on 31 March 1782. She arrived at Kedgeree on 17 September. She was at Madras again on 28 November before returning to Kedgeree on 2 February 1783. She was at Calcutta on 12 July. A dispatch from Fort Saint George (Madras), dated 10 August 1783, stated that Earl of Chesterfield, Kent, and Latham would be obliged to return to Bengal, but did not specify why. A letter from Captain Boswell dated at Bengal in November reported that Earl of Chesterfield had developed a leak four days sail from Bengal and had been obliged to put back. She had been hove down and would resume her voyage.

She was at Culpee (on the Hooghly River on 18 November and Colombo on 13 December, before arriving at Bombay on 16 February 1784. She visited Anjengo on 4 April and returned to Bombay on 5 June. She then sailed for China on 3 August in company with Nassau. Earl of Chesterfield reached Malacca on 15 September and Batavia on 12 December. She sailed from Batavia on 15 June 1785 and arrived at Whampoa Anchorage on 18 July. Homeward bound, she sailed from Whampoa on 1 December, reached St Helena on 17 March 1786, and arrived back at Gravesend on 24 June.

The EIC dismissed Boswell from command for inefficiency but a court-martial reinstated him on 9 October 1788 after all-day balloting.

2nd EIC voyage (1787—1788): Captain John Cranstoun sailed from the Downs on 19 February 1787, bound for St Helena and Bencoolen. Earl of Chesterfield reached St Helena on 11 May and arrived at Bencoolen on 29 August. She was at Pulau Pisang on 7 December. (Note: Pisang or Pulau Pisang, (5.120294°S 103.847637°E), an island off the south coast of Sumatra, between Benkulen and Bengkunat (Bencoomat).) She was at the Cape on 8 February 1788, reached St Helena on 28 February, and arrived back at Blackwall on 1 June.

3rd EIC voyage (1789—1790): Captain Henry Burges sailed from Falmouth on 8 April 1789, bound for Madras, Bencoolen, and Bengal. Earl of Chesterfield reached Madras on 27 July and Bencoolen on 29 September. She arrived at Diamond Harbour on 3 December. Homeward bound, she was at Saugor on 28 January 1790. She was at Madras on 11 March, reached St Helena on 16 July, and arrived at Long Reach on 14 September.

4th EIC voyage (1793–1794) Captain Burges sailed from Torbay on 14 January 1793, bound for Bombay and China. Earl of Chesterfield reached Bombay on 17 May and arrived at Whampoa on 12 September. Homeward bound, she crossed the Second Bar on 19 November and reached St Helena on 22 April 1794. She was at Galway Bay on 20 July and arrived back at Long Reach on 30 August.

== Fate ==
Earl of Chesterfield was sold in 1794 for breaking up.
