= Christ Church, Eaton =

Coordinates: 53.1855°N 2.1965°W

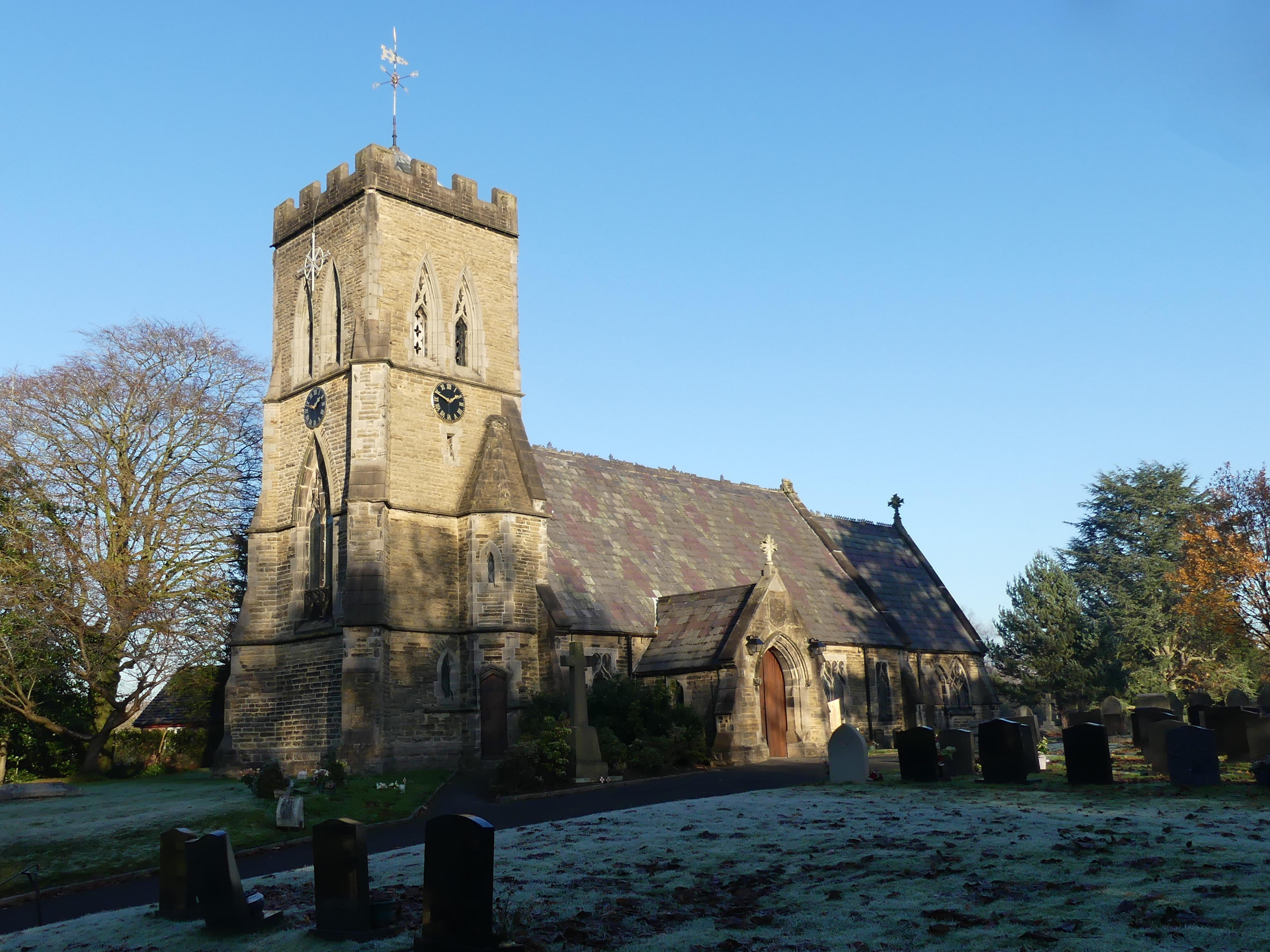
- Christ Church, Eaton, from the southwest

- Location in Cheshire
- OS grid reference: SJ 870 655
- Location: Macclesfield Road, Eaton, Cheshire East
- Country: England
- Denomination: Anglican
- Website: Christ Church, Eaton

History
- Status: Parish church

Architecture
- Functional status: Active
- Heritage designation: Grade II
- Designated: 25 October 1985
- Architect: Raffles Brown
- Architectural type: Church
- Style: Gothic Revival
- Groundbreaking: 1856
- Completed: 1858

Specifications
- Materials: Stone, slate roof

Administration
- Province: York
- Diocese: Chester
- Archdeaconry: Macclesfield
- Deanery: Congleton
- Parish: Eaton with Hulme Walfield

Clergy
- Vicar: Revd Jim Cartlidge

Christ Church is in Macclesfield Road, the A536 road, to the south of the village of Eaton, Cheshire East, England. It is an active Anglican parish church in the deanery of Congleton, the archdeaconry of Macclesfield, and the diocese of Chester. Its benefice is combined with those of St James and St Paul, Marton, All Saints, Siddington, and Holy Trinity, Capesthorne. The church is recorded in the National Heritage List for England as a designated Grade II listed building.

== History ==
Christ Church was built between 1856 and 1858 to a design by Raffles Brown. It is described by the authors of the Buildings of England series as a "tiny church ... in fantasy Gothic.

== Architecture ==
The church is constructed in rubble stone, with ashlar dressings, and has a slate roof. Its plan consists of a four-bay nave, a chancel with a north vestry, a south porch, and a west tower. The tower has angle buttresses, a stair turret at the junction with the nave on the south, a battlemented parapet, and a small pyramidal roof. It is in three stages on a plinth. In the bottom stage is a two-light west window with a sharply pointed arch, containing Decorated tracery. The middle stage contains circular clock faces and, on the north and south sides a narrow rectangular opening below the clock. In the top stage are two lancet bell openings on each side.

Inside the church is a hammerbeam roof with floral bosses. The stained glass in the northeast window was given by the architect, and made by Forrest and Brownley of Liverpool. There is also a window dated 1969 by Francis Skeat. There is a ring of three bells. The oldest of these was cast in 1815 by William Dobson; the other two were cast in 1876 by John Taylor & Co.

== External features ==
The churchyard contains the war grave of a Second World War Royal Naval Volunteer Reserve officer.

== See also ==
- Listed buildings in Eaton, Cheshire East
