= Listed buildings in Eaton, Cheshire East =

Eaton is a civil parish in Cheshire East, England. It contains six buildings that are recorded in the National Heritage List for England as designated listed buildings, all of which are at Grade II. This grade is the lowest of the three gradings given to listed buildings and is applied to "buildings of national importance and special interest". Apart from the village of Eaton, the parish is mainly rural, the exceptions being a large sand excavation on the site of the former Eaton Hall, and a former industrial settlement named Havannah. There are two listed structures associated with Havannah, a bridge and a weir. The other listed buildings are a church, a public house, a house, and a farmhouse.

Name and location	Photograph	Date	Notes
Church House; 53.18613°N 2.19645°W		Early to mid-17th century	The house is partly timber-framed on a stone plinth, and partly in brick. It has a stone-slate roof, is in a T-shaped plan, and has two storeys. The windows are casements.
Plough Inn; 53.18688°N 2.19672°W		Mid-17th century	A public house in two ranges, the rear west range being the older. It is partly timber-framed on stone plinth with rendered panels, and partly in brick with stone dressings. The front east range dates from the 19th century, is built in brick, and has two storeys. Inside the west wing is an inglenook and a bressumer.
Yewtree Farm; 53.18567°N 2.19194°W	—	Mid- to late 17th century	A timber-framed farmhouse with brick infill on a stone plinth, and with a slate roof. There is a 19th-century extension to the left. The farmhouse is in two storeys. At the rear some wattle and daub infill is still present.
Havannah Bridge; 53.17848°N 2.19845°W		Early to mid-19th century	The bridge carries Havannah Lane across the River Dane, and was built to provide access to the industrial settlement founded by Charles Roe. It is constructed in stone, and consists of a single segmental arch with voussoirs.
Havannah Weir; 53.17893°N 2.19762°W		Early to mid-19th century	Havannah was an industrial settlement founded by Charles Roe. The weir is on the River Dane, and helped to provide power for the mills in the settlement.
Christ Church; 53.18550°N 2.19650°W		1856–58	A small church designed by Raffles Brown in Gothic Revival style. It is built in stone with a slate roof, and consists of a nave, a porch, a vestry, a chancel, and a west tower. The tower has buttresses, a stair turret, clock faces, a battlemented parapet, and a small pyramidal roof. Inside the church is a hammerbeam roof.

== See also ==
- Listed buildings in Congleton
- Listed buildings in Marton
- Listed buildings in North Rode
- Listed buildings in Hulme Walfield
