= Chesterfield (ship) =

Several vessels have been named Chesterfield.

- Chesterfield (1791 ship) was built in America in 1781, but it is not clear where and under what name. She arrived in England in 1791. Between 1792 and 1798 Chesterfield made three voyages to the southern whale fishery. On the first of these, her crew was involved in a sanguinary encounter with the local inhabitants of an island in Torres Strait. Also in 1793, on the first voyage, her captain named the Chesterfield Islands after his vessel, or her namesake. After her whaling voyages new owners sailed her to trade with the Mediterranean. A Spanish privateer captured her in 1805.
- Chesterfield (1800 ship), of 207 tons (bm), was launched at Dartmouth in 1800. She was a Falmouth Post Office packet service packet. In 1814 she captured a Guernsey privateer in a case of a blue-on-blue incident. In early 1815 she repelled an attack by a United States privateer in a single-ship action.
- Chesterfield (1806 ship) was launched in 1806 at Portland. She served from November 1806 to her capture in October 1811, as a Post Office Packet Service, sailing between Weymouth and the Channel Islands. A French privateer captured her at the end of October 1811. She then became a French privateer that made several captures before the Royal Navy recaptured her.

== See also ==
- Earl of Chesterfield, which was launched in 1781 as an East Indiaman. She made four voyages for the British East India Company (EIC) before she was sold in 1794 for breaking up.
- HMS Chesterfield – one of three vessels of the Royal Navy.
