= Somerford Booths Hall =

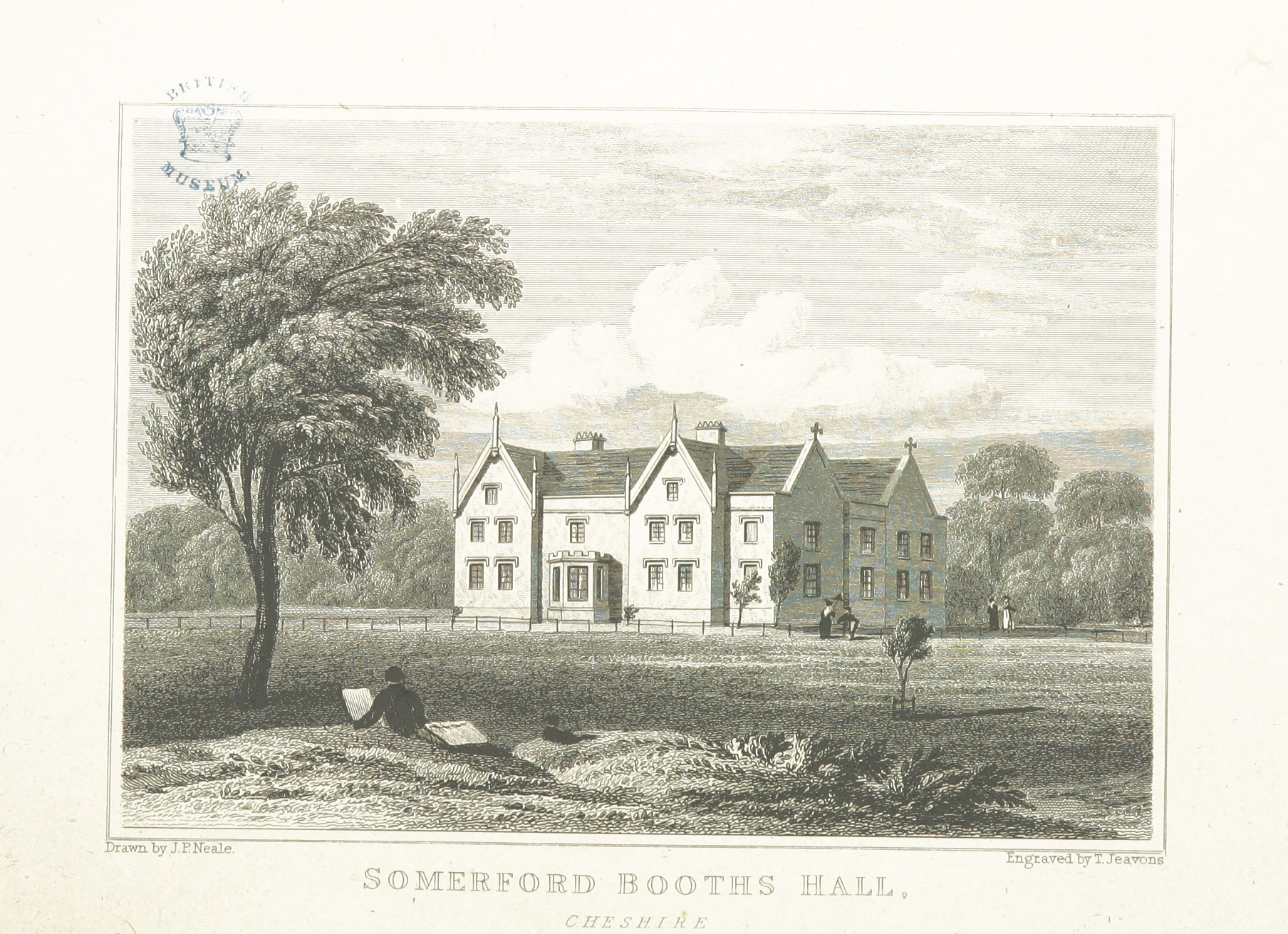
- Somerford Booths Hall in 1824

- Location in Cheshire
- 53.18663°N 2.25477°W
- Location: Somerford Booths, Cheshire, England
- OS grid reference: SJ 831 655

History
- Built: 1612
- Built for: Edmund Swetenham

Site notes
- Architect: John Webb (restoration)
- Restored: 1817
- Restored by: Clement Swetenham

Listed Building – Grade II*
- Designated: 6 June 1952
- Reference no.: 1138721

Somerford Booths Hall is a grade II* listed country house in the parish of Somerford Booths, Cheshire, England, 3 kilometres (1.9 mi) northwest of Congleton on the bank of the River Dane.

== History ==
The house was built in 1612 as a moated dwelling for Edmund Swetenham. After several generations of Swetenhams the ownership passed in 1768 to Roger Cumberbatch, who then assumed the name and arms of Swetenham. The house was improved for Clement Swetenham in 1817 by John Webb. After several more generations the house was sold in the 1930s.

During much of the 20th century the house has been used as offices. In 2010 planning permission was granted to restore it for residential use.

== Architecture ==
The house is constructed in rendered brick, with ashlar dressings and a slate roof. It has an E-shaped plan and is in two storeys plus attics. The entrance front is symmetrical in five bays, the central and lateral bays projecting forwards. The central bay comprises a porch, containing a doorway with a lintel inscribed with "Edmund Swetenham" and the date 1612. Above this is a four-light window with mullions and a transom. At the top of the bay is a small gable with ball finials at the sides and apex. The recessed bays on each sides of the porch, and the projecting lateral wings, have five-light windows in the ground floor and four-light windows in the upper storey. The lateral wings are gabled and have ball finials. Behind and above the projecting wings is the attic floor that contains three gables, each with a three-light window and more ball finials. The left side of the house has four bays, three of which are gabled. In the ground floor are four sets of French windows; the upper floor contains sash windows. At the rear are five symmetrical bays, the central bay having a flat parapet, the others being gabled. The central bay contains a single-storey bay window. The house is recorded in the National Heritage List for England as a designated Grade II* listed building.

== See also ==
- Grade II* listed buildings in Cheshire East
- Listed buildings in Somerford Booths
