= Newsbank, Cheshire =

Hamlet in Cheshire, England

Coordinates: 53.19°N 2.25°W

Newsbank
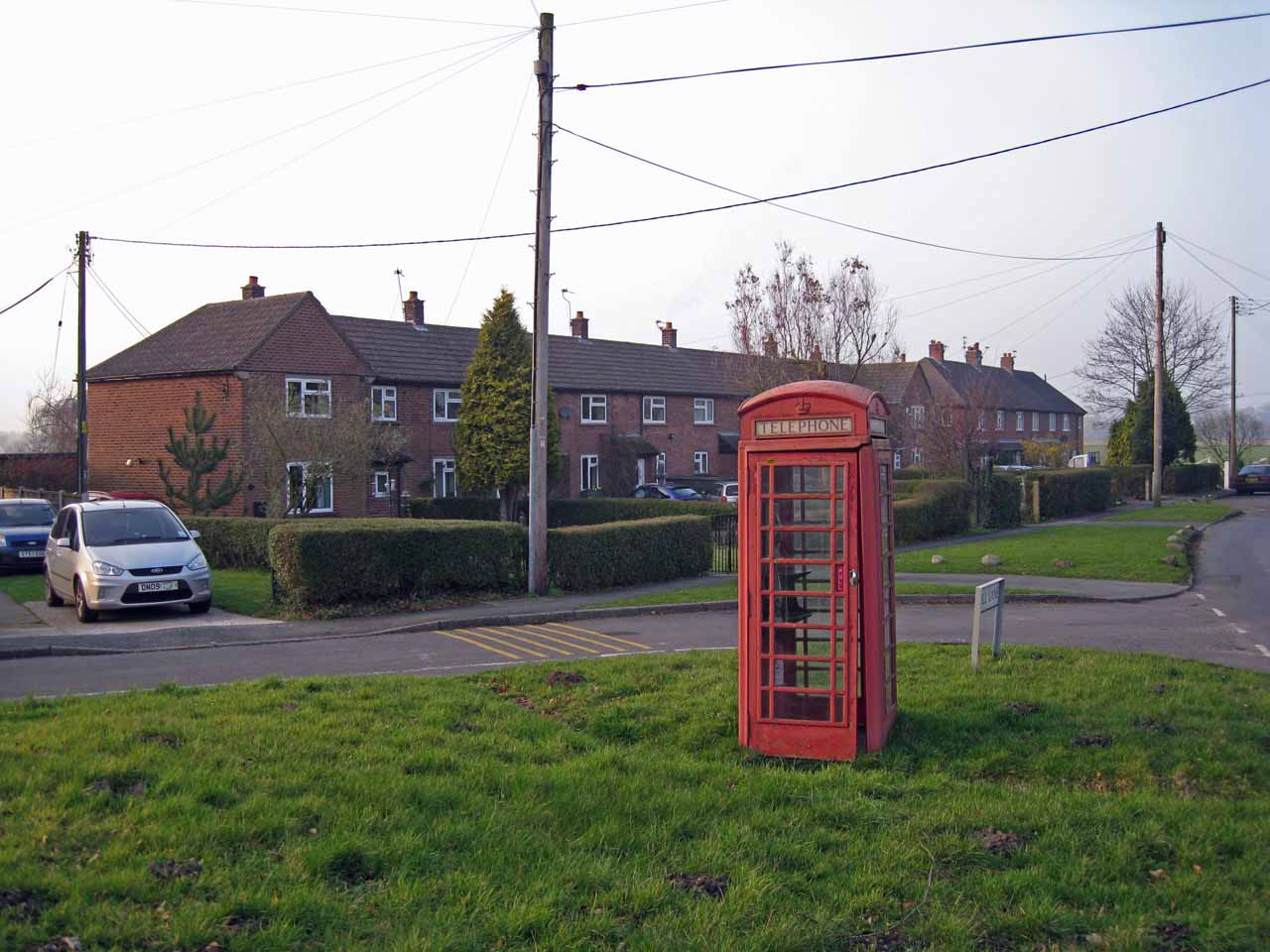
- Houses at Newsbank

- Location within Cheshire
- OS grid reference: SJ833662
- Civil parish: Somerford Booths
- Unitary authority: Cheshire East
- Ceremonial county: Cheshire
- Region: North West
- Country: England
- Sovereign state: United Kingdom
- Post town: CONGLETON
- Postcode district: CW12
- Dialling code: 01260
- Police: Cheshire
- Fire: Cheshire
- Ambulance: North West
- UK Parliament: Congleton

Newsbank is a hamlet in Cheshire, England. It is situated approximately 2 miles (3.2 km) north west of the market town of Congleton and is the main settlement of the parish of Somerford Booths.
