= Listed buildings in Siddington, Cheshire =

Siddington is a civil parish in Cheshire East, England. It consists of 23 buildings that are recorded in the National Heritage List for England as designated listed buildings. Of these, three are listed at Grade II*, the middle grade, and the others are at Grade II. The major building in the parish is Capesthorne Hall; the hall, its chapel and chapel gates, and three other structures in the grounds are listed. Otherwise, apart from the village of Siddington, the parish is rural, and most of the listed buildings are farms, farm buildings, houses, cottages, and associated structures. The other listed buildings are a church with a cross base in the churchyard, a mill, and a bridge.

== Key ==
Grade	Criteria
II*	Particularly important buildings of more than special interest
II	Buildings of national importance and special interest

== Buildings ==
Name and location	Photograph	Date	Notes	Grade
Cross base 53.23422°N 2.23172°W		16th century	The cross base is in the churchyard of All Saints Church. It is in stone, and consists of three steps and a square base carrying the lower part of an octagonal shaft.	II
All Saints Church; 53.23428°N 2.23182°W		Late 16th century	The church is timber-framed with plaster infill, and was largely encased in brick in about 1815. There were restorations later in the century. The west wall has been painted to resemble timber-framing, and there is a roof of Kerridge stone-slate. The church consists of a nave and a chancel, with a north vestry and a south porch. There is a bellcote on the west gable. Inside the church is a 14th-century wooden screen and a west gallery.	II*
Home Farmhouse; 53.25817°N 2.23521°W	—	Mid-17th century	A brick farmhouse with stone dressings and a stone-slate roof. It is in two storeys and has a symmetrical entrance front of three bays. There is a 19th-century gabled porch with ball finials. The windows are casements.	II
Henshaw Hall Farmhouse; 53.23163°N 2.20897°W	—	1674	The farmhouse is in brick with a slate roof. It is in two storeys and has a four-bay front. The windows are casements, and above the door is a datestone. Inside are some timber-framed partition walls.	II
Blake House Cottage; 53.24071°N 2.24422°W		Late 17th century	A house partly timber-framed with brick infill, and partly in brick. It is in two storeys and has a thatched roof. The windows are casements, and there are clasping buttresses on the corners.	II
Nursery Lane Cottage; 53.23912°N 2.23872°W		Late 17th century	A brick house with a thatched roof in two storeys. There are four bays at the front, with the door at the extreme right. The windows are casements.	II
Stable building, The Kennels; 53.24832°N 2.24338°W	—	Late 17th century	The stable building is in brick with a stone-slate roof. It is in two storeys, and has an entrance front of seven bays. The building contains doorways and casement windows, some of which have pointed heads and Gothick Y-tracery. In the upper storey are vertical ventilation slots.	II
Outbuilding, Whisterfield Cottage South; 53.23635°N 2.25636°W		Late 17th century	The outbuilding is timber-framed with brick infill on a brick plinth, and has a cement tile roof. There are two doorways.	II
Capesthorne Hall; 53.25169°N 2.24065°W		1719	A country house, refronted in Jacobean style by Edward Blore in 1837–39, and rebuilt after a fire by Anthony Salvin. It is in brick with stone dressings, and has a slate roof. The central block is in three storeys with cellars, and the blocks at the sides are in two storeys. The central block has a seven-bay front. Features include a colonnade along the front, and four turrets with ogee caps and finials. The garden wall surrounding the entrance court are included in the listing.	II*
Holy Trinity Chapel; 53.25134°N 2.24108°W	—	1722	The private chapel of Capesthorne Hall was designed by Joseph Ward in Neoclassical style. It is built in brick with stone dressings, and has a slate roof. The chapel consists of a nave and a chancel with an apse. Around the top of the chapel is a balustrade, and there is a bell turret with a cupola.	II*
Roadside Cottage and Roadside House; 53.23941°N 2.23359°W		Early 18th century	A pair of brick cottages with thatched roofs. They are in two storeys, and on the road front are seven bays. The windows are casements.	II
Gate piers and gates, Holy Trinity Chapel; 53.25121°N 2.24163°W	—	c. 1750	The gates are in wrought iron, and have arched centres containing Rococo panels with statues of St Andrew and his cross. The gate piers date from the 20th century, and are in brick with stone dressings. They stand on stone plinths and have stepped stone caps with ball finials.	II
Farm building, Home Farm; 53.25849°N 2.23540°W	—	Mid-18th century	The farm building is in brick with stone dressings and a slate roof. It is in two storeys, with doors and windows on the ground floor and two loft doors above. On the gables are ball finials.	II
Stable block, Siddington Manor; 53.23788°N 2.20175°W	—	Late 18th century	The stable block is in brick, it is in two storeys, and forms a courtyard plan. The front is in nine bays, the central three bays projecting forward. These contain double doors with oculi above. Over these is a cornice and a pedimented gable containing a circular clock face, and on the ridge is an octagonal bellcote. The windows are sashes.	II
Whisterfield Cottage North; 53.23698°N 2.25305°W		Late 18th century	A brick house with a roof of cement tiles. It is in two storeys, and has a two-bay front. The door is left of centre, and is flanked by three-light casement windows with similar windows in the upper storey. To the right is a single-bay extension, and there is another extension to the rear, both dating from the 20th century.	II
Icehouse, Capesthorne Hall; 53.25134°N 2.24465°W	—	18th or early 19th century	The icehouse is built in brick, and consists of a circular domed chamber. A short barrel vaulted passage leads to a rectangular entrance to the chamber.	II
Siddington Manor; 53.23737°N 2.20200°W	—	18th or early 19th century	A house in rendered brick on a stone plinth with stone dressings. It is in two storeys and has an entrance front of seven bays. On the front is a projecting porch with pairs of Ionic pilasters and an entablature. Above the door is a fanlight. The windows are sashes, and at the top of the house is a parapet with a moulded cornice.	II
Simonswood Farmhouse; 53.23551°N 2.22161°W	—	Late 18th or early 19th century	A brick farmhouse on a stone plinth with a slate roof. It is in two storeys, and has a symmetrical three-bay entrance front. The central bay projects forward and contains a doorway, above which is a gable with a recessed niche. The windows are casements with hood moulds.	II
Siddington Bridge; 53.23579°N 2.23383°W	—	1829	The bridge carries the A34 road over a brook. It is built in brick with stone coping, and consists of a single horseshoe arch with a keystone. The retaining walls lead to a square pier with a pyramidal stone cap.	II
North Lodge, Capesthorne Hall; 53.25768°N 2.23503°W		c. 1843	The lodge was designed by Edward Blore, and consists of a square tower, built in brick with stone dressings. It is in three stages, and the windows are mullioned. At the top is a panelled parapet with corner pierced ogee finials. The roof is ogee-shaped with a ball finial and a flagpole. The door is on the left side, and to the right are 20th-century extensions.	II
Bridge over lake, Capesthorne Hall; 53.25004°N 2.24061°W		c. 1843	The bridge crosses the lake in the grounds of Capesthorne Hall. It is constructed in brick with stone dressings, and consists of five segmental arches with abutments. The arches have rusticated voussoirs and keystones, with a hood mould above. Between the arches are pilaster buttresses, and over the bridge is a balustrade with square piers.	II
Siddington Mill; 53.23568°N 2.23412°W	—	1850s	The mill is in brick with stone dressings and a slate roof. At street level it is in a single storey, and at the rear it has three storeys. Along the sides are four bays. The entrance is in the gabled left side. The doorway has a four-centred arch and above it is a carved tablet. The bargeboards are decorated. To the left of the entrance is a building with a pyramidal roof.	II
School house 53.23883°N 2.23282°W		c. 1860	The building is in brick with a slate roof. The house is in three storeys, with single-storey classroom wings. The doors and windows have Tudor arched heads. The gables at the ends of the building have moulded bargeboards and finials.	II
