= Marton, Cheshire =

Village in Cheshire, England

Coordinates: 53.211°N 2.225°W

Marton
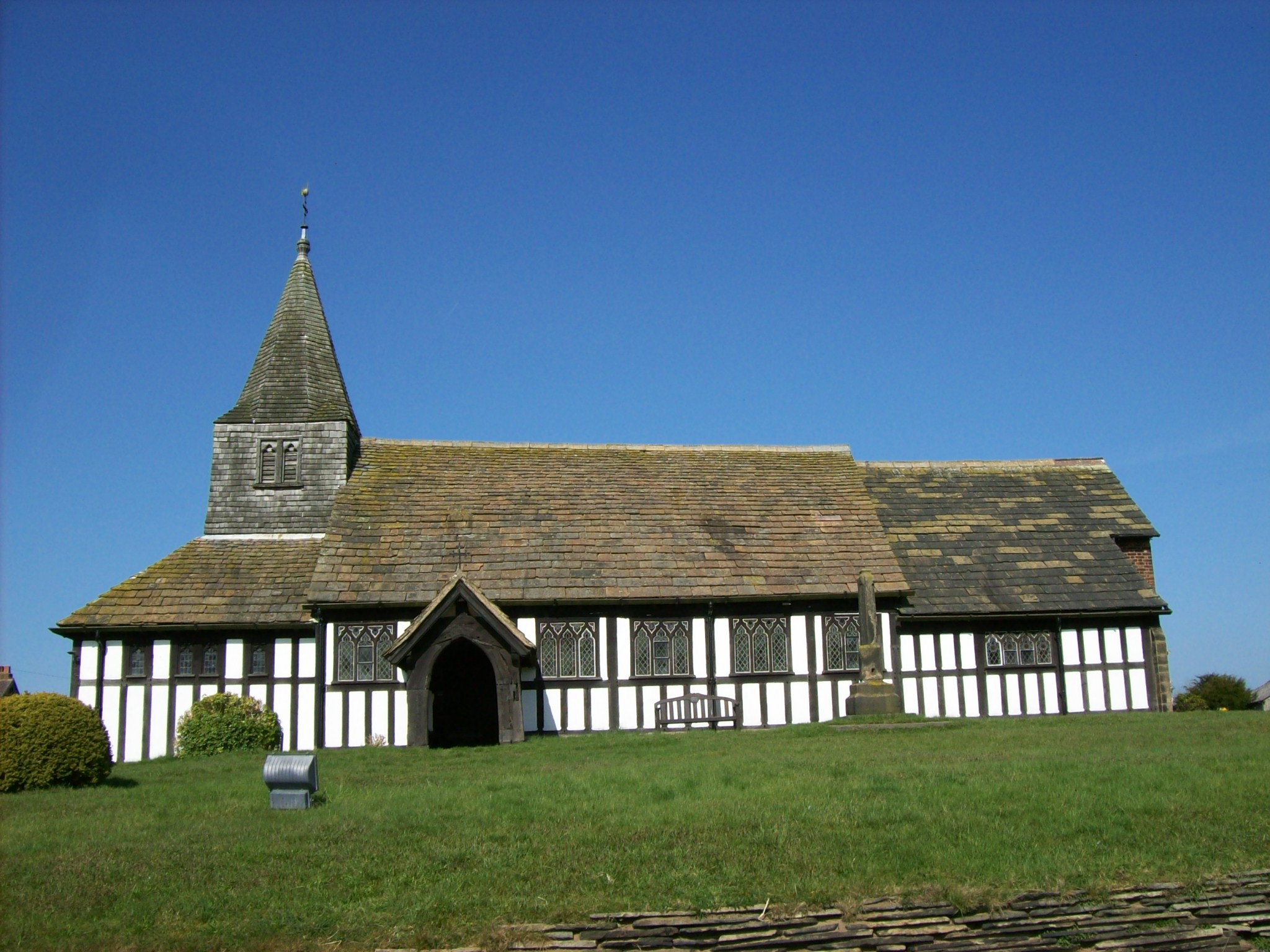
- St James' and St Paul's Church, Marton

- Location within Cheshire
- OS grid reference: SJ849682
- Civil parish: Marton
- Unitary authority: Cheshire East
- Ceremonial county: Cheshire
- Region: North West
- Country: England
- Sovereign state: United Kingdom
- Post town: MACCLESFIELD
- Postcode district: SK11
- Dialling code: 01260
- Police: Cheshire
- Fire: Cheshire
- Ambulance: North West
- UK Parliament: Macclesfield

Marton, Cheshire is a small village and civil parish in the unitary authority of Cheshire East and the ceremonial county of Cheshire, England, on the A34 road 3 miles (5 km) north of Congleton (grid reference SJ850682). Its correct postal address is "Marton, Macclesfield",n which avoids confusion with "Marton, Winsford".

Its outstanding feature is the 14th-century timber-framed church of St James and St Paul, founded in 1343. A plaque outside the church claims it is the oldest timber-framed church still in use in Europe.

Marton is also home to a sessile oak known as the Marton Oak. The oldest in Cheshire, it is one of the biggest oaks in Britain. Although its trunk is split, it has a single root system and is therefore regarded as a single tree. At one time its circumference was 58 feet (17.7 m); it is estimated to be over 1,200 years old.

== Facilities ==
Marton & District primary school, founded in the 1960s to serve several local villages in a large catchment area, is aided by the Church of England and has a roll of between 180 and 200 children.

The village pub, the Davenport Arms, formerly housed an Italian restaurant, but as of 2022 operates as a steakhouse. Nearby, converted farm buildings house a restaurant, La Popote; a café, the Old Barn; and a pet-grooming salon, Gus & Bear.

== See also ==
- Listed buildings in Marton, Cheshire
- St James' and St Paul's Church, Marton
