= Hulme Walfield =

Village in Cheshire, England

Coordinates: 53.182778°N 2.228679°W

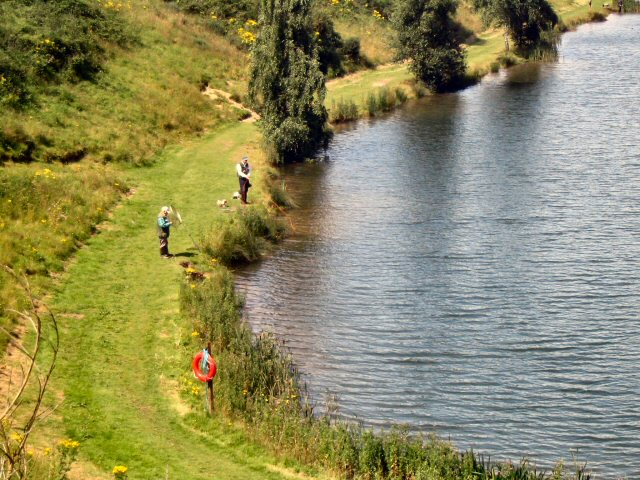
- Westlow Mere, Hulme Walfield

- Location within Cheshire
- Population: 148 (148)
- OS grid reference: SJ848651
- Civil parish: Hulme Walfield
- Unitary authority: Cheshire East
- Ceremonial county: Cheshire
- Region: North West
- Country: England
- Sovereign state: United Kingdom
- Post town: CONGLETON
- Postcode district: CW12
- Dialling code: 01260
- Police: Cheshire
- Fire: Cheshire
- Ambulance: North West
- UK Parliament: Congleton

Hulme Walfield is a small village and civil parish, just north of Congleton, in the unitary authority of Cheshire East and the ceremonial county of Cheshire. It is home to most of Westlow Mere. According to the 2001 census, the population of the civil parish was 140, increasing slightly to 148 at the 2011 Census

== Governance ==
Because of its small size, it has a grouping arrangement with the adjacent civil parish of Somerford Booths and holds joint parish council meetings. The parish council is therefore known as Hulme Walfield & Somerford Booths parish council.

== See also ==
- Listed buildings in Hulme Walfield
