= Kent (1781 ship) =

History

Great Britain
- Name: Kent
- Owner: William Moffatt
- Builder: Wells, Deptford
- Launched: 21 August 1781
- Fate: Sold 1797 for breaking up

General characteristics
- Tons burthen: 755, or 783, or 78378/94 (bm)
- Length: Overall:145 ft 11 in (44.5 m); Keel:118 ft 10 1/2 in (36.2 m), breadth 35 ft 2 1/2 in (10.732 m), hold 14 ft 9 3/4 in (4.515 m)
- Beam: 35 ft 2 1/2 in (10.7 m) hold 14ft 9 3/4in,
- Depth of hold: 14 ft 9 3/4 in (4.5 m)
- Complement: 1793:99; 1795:100
- Armament: 1793:20 × 6-pounder guns; 1795:26 × 9&6-pounder guns

Kent was launched in Deptford in 1781. She made six voyages to India, China, and South East Asia for the British East India Company (EIC), and participated as a transport in one military campaign. She was sold for breaking up in 1797.

== Career ==
1st EIC voyage (1782–1785): Captain Peter Stoakes sailed from Portsmouth on 6 February 1782, bound for Madras and China. Kent was at 29 Apr Rio de Janeiro and Bombay on 6 September. She reached Madras on 19 October, and arrived at Diamond Harbour on 9 December. On 15 January 1783 she was at Kedgeree and on 21 May Ingeli. (Note: Ingeli (or Hijili, Engelee, Ingelee, or Hidgelee), was a point on the west side of the Hooghli Estuary.) Bound to China, she was at Madras on 13 September and Batavia on 19 November; she arrived at Whampoa anchorage on 20 February 1784. Homeward bound, she crossed the Second Bar on 7 April. She sailed via Java/Sumatra, reaching Great Nanka, (Note: Great Nanka (2°25′S 105°48′E), is one of the three Nanka Islands, which lie in Banka Strait, just off Banka Island (Palau Banka), which is part of the Banka Belitung Islands group.) and Mew Bay on 29 August. (Note: Mew Bay is about two miles east of Tanjung Layar.) Kent reached St Helena on 12 November and Kinsale on 7 April 1785. She arrived back at the Downs on 18 May.

2nd EIC voyage (1785–1787): Captain Richard Hardinge sailed from the Downs on 17 December 1785, bound for st Helena and Bencoolen. Kent reached St Helena on 2 April 1786 and arrived at Batavia on 1 August. She was at Island on 6 September, (Note: Rat Island is a small island west of Bengkulu.) Pring on 6 December, (Note: Pring was a pepper port some 16 miles northwest of Manna Point, on the west coast of Sumatra.) and Manna Point on 16 December. (Note: Manna Point or Town, is southeast of Bengkulu, on the west coast of Sumatra; now Mana (4.484947°S 102.899207°E).) Homeward bound, she was at Rat Island again on 23 December, reached St Helena on 23 March 1787, and arrived on 17 June in the Downs.

3rd EIC voyage (1788–1789): Captain Hardinge sailed from the Downs on 4 April 1788, bound for Bengal. Kent arrived at Diamond Harbour on 19 July. HOmeward bound, she was at Cox's Island on 16 December, (Note: Cox's Island was a small island merged into the north end of Saugor Island at the mouth of the Hooghly.) the Cape on 24 March 1789, and st Helena on 15 April. On 6 June she arrived back at the Downs.

4th EIC voyage (1791–1792): Captain Hardinge sailed from the Downs on 27 March 1791, bound for Madras and Bengal. Kent was at False Bay on 13 June and Madras on 7 August. She arrived at Diamond Harbour on 19 August. She was at Madras again on 8 October before returning to Diamond Harbour on 15 November. Homeward bound, she was at Saugor on 4 January 1792, Madras on 20 February, and St Helena on 14 May. She arrived back at the Downs on 18 July.

5th EIC voyage (1793–1794): War with France had broken out and Captain Richard Hardinge was issued a letter of marque on 21 August 1793. He had already sailed from Portsmouth on 7 July 1793, bound for Bengal. Kent arrived at Diamond Harbour on 18 November. Homeward bound, she was at Cox's Island on 22 January 1794, St Helena on 1 May, and Galway on 20 July. she arrived back at the Downs on 27 August.

6th EIC voyage (1795–1797): Captain George Saltwell acquired a letter of marque on 4 March 1795. He sailed from Portsmouth on 24 May 1795, bound for China. On her way to China Kent participated in the British Invasion of the Cape Colony.

To transport troops the British government used East Indiamen of the EIC that were going on to India and China. The transports rendezvoused at San Salvador in early July, with Kent arriving on 6 July.

The fleet arrived at Simons Bay on 3 September. Kent was at the Cape on 30 October. After they had landed their troops, the East Indiamen continued on their voyages to India and China. Kent reached Balambangan on 12 December and arrived at Whampoa on 6 March 1796. Homeward bound, she crossed the Second Bar on 21 June, reached St Helena on 20 November, and arrived in the Downs on 8 February 1797.

== Fate ==
In 1797 Kent was sold for breaking up.
