= Listed buildings in Somerford Booths =

Somerford Booths is a civil parish in Cheshire East, England. It contains five buildings that are recorded in the National Heritage List for England as designated listed buildings. Of these, one is listed at Grade II*, the middle grade, and the others are at Grade II. The parish is almost entirely rural, and the listed buildings consist of country houses, farmhouses and a farm building.

== Key ==
Grade	Criteria
II*	Particularly important buildings of more than special interest
II	Buildings of national importance and special interest

== Buildings ==
Name and location	Photograph	Date	Notes	Grade
Grove House Farmhouse; 53.19683°N 2.23951°W	—	16th century	The farmhouse was altered in the 17th century, and again in the 19th century, when a wing was added giving it a T-shaped plan. It is in two storeys, and has a slate roof. The 17th-century wing is timber-framed and re-faced in brick. It has 20th-century windows, those in the upper storey being in two half-dormers. The 19th-century wing is in brick with a symmetrical three-bay front. The central doorway has an open pediment, and the windows are sashes with stone sills and wedge lintels with triple keystones. Inside the original wing are crucks.	II
Somerford Booths Hall; 53.18663°N 2.25478°W		1612	A country house that was altered in about 1817 by John Webb. It is built in rendered brick with stone dressings and has a slate roof. The house is in two storeys with an attic, it has an E-shaped double pile plan, and an entrance front of five symmetrical bays. The centre and outer bays project forward, the central bay forming a porch with an inscribed lintel above the doorway, and a gable with ball finials. The windows are a mix of sashes and casements, some of which are mullioned and/or transomed. There are also French windows and a bay window.	II*
Old Hall Farmhouse; 53.19833°N 2.25986°W	—	17th century	A timber-framed farmhouse with additional wings added later. It stands on a stone plinth and has a slate roof. The whole house has been covered in render. The windows are casements, one of which is mullioned. The drawing room has a massive brick chimney breast.	II
Outbuilding, Broomfield Farm; 53.20022°N 2.26385°W	—	17th century	The farm building was extended to the right in the 19th and 20th centuries. It is built in brick with stone dressings and a tiled roof. The building is in two storeys, the 17th-century portion having two bays. The entrance has a massive wedge lintel. There are various windows, and on the left side is a circular pitch hole.	II
Broomfield Farmhouse; 53.19999°N 2.26403°W		Late 17th century	A small country house in brick and stone with stone dressings and a slate roof. It is in two storeys with an attic and a basement, and has an entrance front of six bays. To the right of the centre is a porch wing with a round arch containing voussoirs and a keystone.	II
