= Capesthorne Hall =

Manor in Cheshire, England

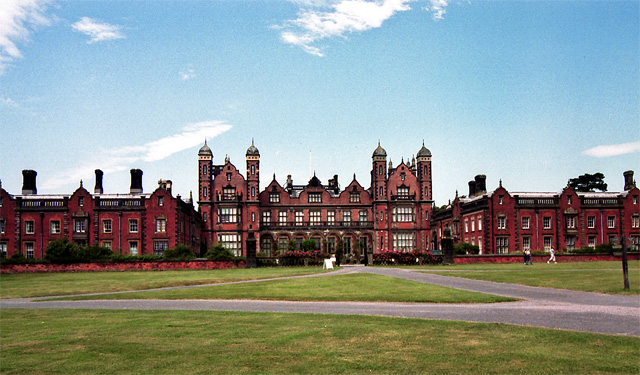
- Entrance front of Capesthorne Hall

- Location in Cheshire
- 53.2517°N 2.2405°W
- Location: Near Siddington, Cheshire, England
- OS grid reference: SJ 840 728

History
- Built: 1719–32
- Built for: John Ward
- Rebuilt: After 1861

Site notes
- Architect(s): William Smith, Edward Blore, Anthony Salvin
- Architectural style: Jacobean
- Restored: 1837–39
- Restored by: Edward Davies Davenport
- Governing body: Privately owned

Listed Building – Grade II*
- Designated: 14 April 1967
- Reference no.: 1104882

Capesthorne Hall is a country house near the village of Siddington, Cheshire, England. The house and its private chapel were built in the early 18th century, replacing an earlier hall and chapel nearby. They were built to Neoclassical designs by William Smith and (probably) his son Francis. Later in the 18th century, the house was extended by the addition of an orangery and a drawing room. In the 1830s the house was remodelled by Edward Blore; the work included the addition of an extension and a frontage in Jacobean style, and joining the central block to the service wings. In about 1837 the orangery was replaced by a large conservatory designed by Joseph Paxton. In 1861 the main part of the house was virtually destroyed by fire. It was rebuilt by Anthony Salvin, who generally followed Blore's designs but made modifications to the front, rebuilt the back of the house in Jacobean style, and altered the interior. There were further alterations later in the 19th century, including remodelling of the Saloon. During the Second World War the hall was used by the Red Cross, but subsequent deterioration prompted a restoration.

The hall is built in brick with ashlar dressings and slate roofs, and is a Grade II* listed building. It has a long entrance front consisting of a three-storey central block with lateral wings, each of which has two four-storey turrets. Outside this on each side are two-storey service blocks that project forward, forming a three-sided entrance forecourt. The ground-floor public rooms include a drawing room, a dining room, and a sculpture gallery. The bedrooms, dressing rooms and another gallery are on the first floor. The hall stands in grounds containing gardens and parkland that includes a lake. A particularly notable listed structure in the grounds is the Grade II* listed private chapel, also designed by William Smith, that is contemporaneous with the hall, together with its elaborate Grade II listed gates and gate piers. The bridge over the lake, an icehouse and a lodge are also listed. The earthworks of the previous hall and chapel and a deserted medieval village in the grounds are together designated as a scheduled ancient monument.

Today the hall, chapel and grounds are privately owned by the Bromley-Davenport family. They are open to the public at advertised times, and are used for special events. They are also available to be hired for purposes such as weddings and corporate events.

== History ==
The manor of Capesthorne was held by the Capesthorne family until 1386, when it passed to the Ward family. The house previously on the site was 290 metres (317 yd) to the west, with a chapel 25 metres (27 yd) to its north, its site being marked by a brick column in the grounds. In 1719 John Ward engaged William Smith to design a new house and chapel on a different site. The first parts of the new house to be built were two lateral detached wings, one for domestic offices, and the other for stables and a coach house. The main block of the house followed later. William Smith died in 1724 and it is thought that the main block was designed by his younger brother, Francis Smith. The house was in Neoclassical style, with a front of seven bays, the middle three bays breaking forward under a pediment, and was built in brick with stone dressings. The house was two rooms deep, with a central entrance hall, and a corridor leading from each side.

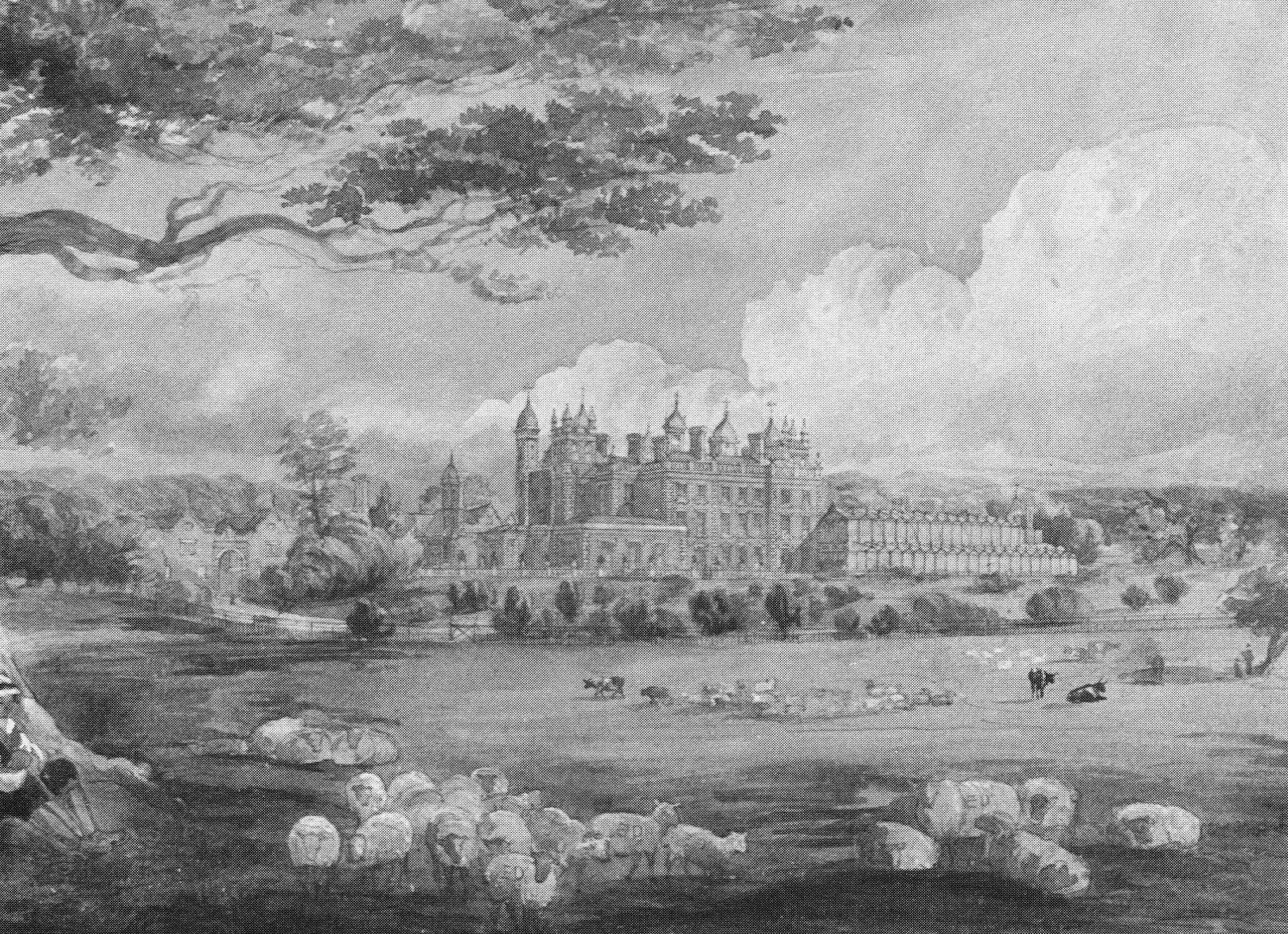
Painting of the garden front of the hall by Edward Blore in about 1827

John Ward was the grandfather of William Davenport, who came to live at Capesthorne upon the death of his father in the late 1730s. Ward maintained a connection with the slave trader William Whaley and when Davenport was 16, Ward sent him to Liverpool to become Whaley's apprentice. Davenport went on to become, by the number of slave voyages, Liverpool's most prolific slave trader.

John Ward died in 1748 and as he had no male heir the manor passed to the Davenport family by the marriage of his daughter Penelope to Davies Davenport. Davies Davenport's grandson (also called Davies Davenport) improved and extended the house, with the addition of a single-storey orangery to the southwest, and a drawing room to the northwest. When he died, his son, Edward Davies Davenport, commissioned Edward Blore to remodel the house. Between 1837 and 1839 Blore joined the lateral wings to the main part of the house by adding new rooms at the sides. He also widened the wings, and built new stables and service courts to the north and south, creating a symmetrical structure. The main part of the house was recessed and, together with the wings, a large forecourt was created. The front of the house itself was refronted in Jacobean style. Mullioned windows replaced sash windows, and a ground floor loggia, and turrets with ogee caps and shaped gables were added. In the centre of the house was a raised attic with a clock and a bellcote. The rest of the building retained its Neoclassical features. The orangery was replaced with a large conservatory designed by Joseph Paxton, and this led directly to the family pew in the chapel. Blore also designed entrance lodges.

In 1861, when the house was owned by Edward's son Arthur Henry Davenport, most of the central part of the house was destroyed by fire, leaving only the wings, the loggia, and part of the front wall. Blore had by then retired and Anthony Salvin was commissioned to rebuild the house. He kept generally to Blore's plans, but gave the entrance front three shaped gables rather than the central attic. At the rear of the house the garden front was rebuilt in Jacobean rather than Neoclassical style. Internally, Salvin changed the proportions of the storeys, making the ground floor ceilings higher. Arthur Henry Davenport died in 1867 before the rebuilding had been completed, and the house passed to William Bromley-Davenport. During his ownership the saloon was remodelled in 1879 as was the chapel in 1884. In the Second World War the house was used by the Red Cross. By this time the fabric of the house had deteriorated, but it has since been restored. The house continues to be owned by the Bromley-Davenport family.

== Architecture ==
=== Exterior ===
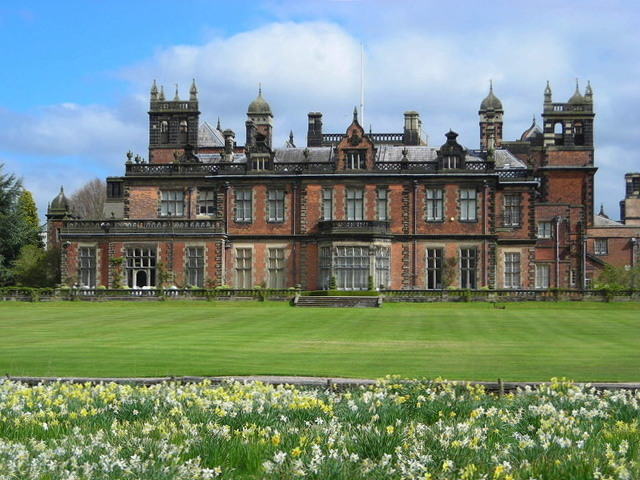
Garden front

Capesthorne Hall is constructed in red brick with ashlar dressings and has a slate roof. Its plan is symmetrical and consists of a central block in three storeys with cellars, and two-storey lateral blocks protruding forward to form three sides of a forecourt. The middle part of the central block is in seven bays, with a colonnade consisting of segmental arches. These are carried on Tuscan columns with circular panels in the spandrels, and keystones decorated with diamond rustication. Behind this are seven mullioned and transomed windows, and there are similar windows in the middle storey. Above these is a cornice and three shaped gables containing mullioned windows. The gables have stone copings and finials, and contain heraldic panels. Flanking the middle part of the central block are three-storey slightly projecting wings. They have one central bay and lateral four-storey turrets. The central bays contain two-storey canted bay windows, above which are pierced stone parapets, three-light mullioned windows, and shaped gables with pierced ogee finials. The turrets have bands between the stages, single-light windows and ogee caps with finials.

Projecting forward on each side of the central block are two-storey service blocks. The façades facing the forecourt are similar, with semicircular arches in front of them, that on the left side being blocked, and the arch on the right side forming a porte-cochère. Behind the arches are seven-bay fronts, the central bay projecting slightly and containing a door with a fanlight. Above this is an oriel window on consoles over which is a shaped gable. The other windows in both storeys are sashes. The outward facing fronts are similar to the forecourt fronts, except that the end and centre bays protrude and are gabled. Between the gables are balustraded parapets.

=== Interior ===
In rebuilding the interior of the house after the fire of 1861, Salvin followed Blore's design in some of the rooms, and in others he used his own designs. The Entrance Hall very much follows Blore's design. It has a panelled ceiling with pendants, and the windows contain 19th-century stained glass arranged by Willement, featuring the arms of the Davenport and Ward families. The chimney piece was added by Salvin, and contains the figures of a caryatid and an Atlas that were formerly part of the reading desk of the two-decker pulpit in the chapel. The Sculpture Gallery, also by Blore, also has a panelled ceiling, and consists of a corridor along the sides of which are arched niches. Most of the sculptures in the gallery were collected by Edward Davies Davenport, and consist of ancient copies of famous Greek sculptures. There is also the face of Charles James Fox by Joseph Nollekens, and a pair of Dancing Girls by Antonio Canova. The Saloon is by Salvin, and again has a panelled ceiling. The room features a large fireplace with an overmantel in the early Renaissance style, numerous family portraits, and vases collected on the overseas trips. The Drawing Room, designed by Salvin, is on the garden front, and features a panelled ceiling with pendants, and a floral frieze. In the room are twin fireplaces made from Coade stone, dated to 1789, which originally belonged to the family's house in Belgravia, London. Both are carved, one depicting Faith, Hope and Charity, and the other the Aldobrandini Wedding, a famous ancient Roman painting.

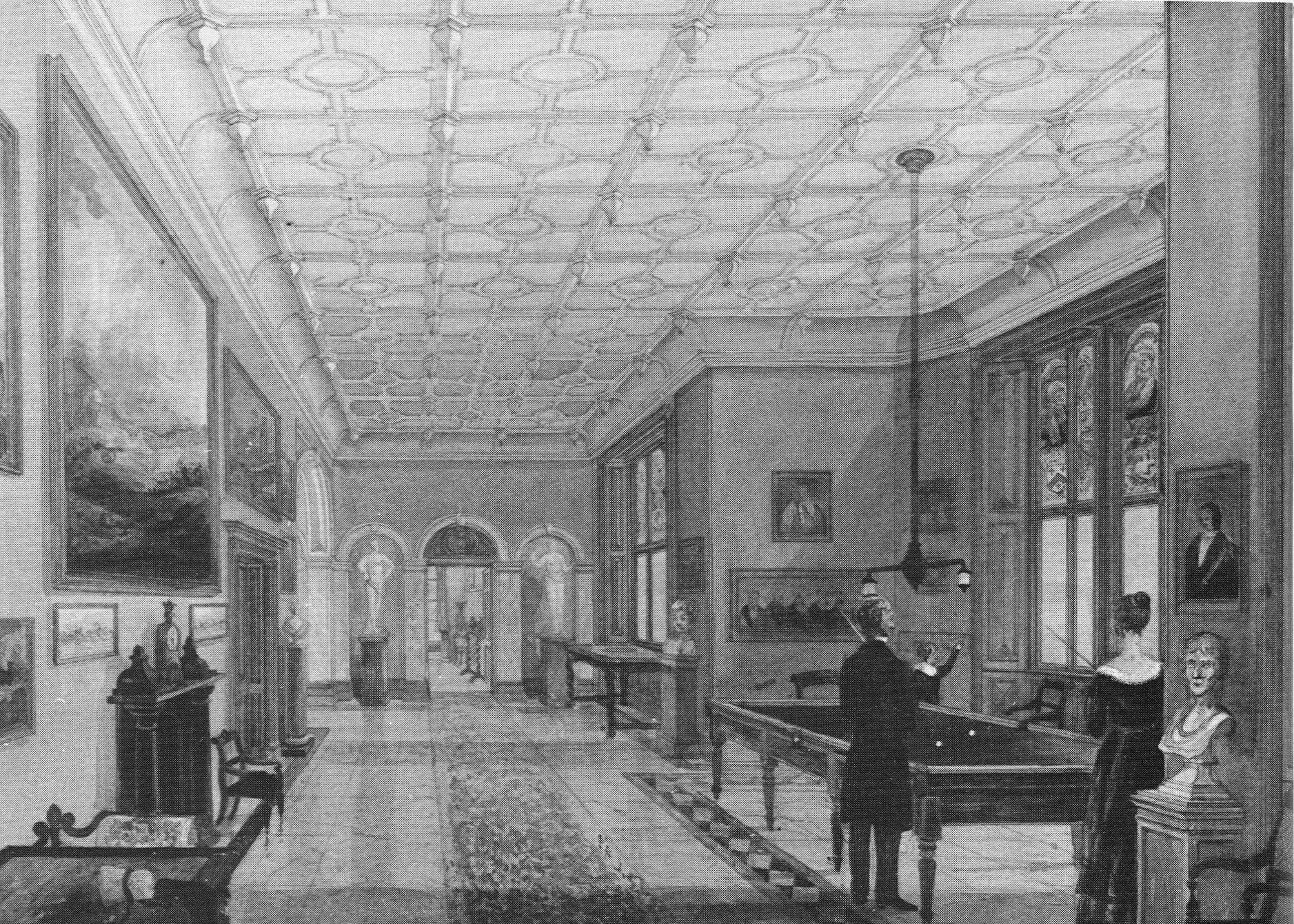
Entrance Hall in 1840

The State Dining Room is very much as Blore designed it, and has a panelled ceiling with pendants, and wooden panelling up to the line of the dado. The room contains a large fireplace in early Renaissance style, made from white and variegated marble, and containing the family arms. Also in the room are sculptures by Joseph Wilton. The Staircase Hall is by Salvin, and is divided from the Sculpture Gallery by three semicircular archways. On the walls are portraits of the Bromley family. The staircase has a wrought iron balustrade decorated with acanthus and roundels with the crests of the Bromleys and the Davenports. The Davenport crest consists of a felon with a rope around his neck; in these roundels the felon has the face of William Gladstone, a political opponent of the Davenports. There are four further ground floor rooms, all by Salvin.

The Library has a panelled ceiling with diamond motifs. It contains imitation Jacobean panelling and a Jacobean fireplace from the now-demolished Marton Hall. The Study also has a panelled ceiling, and in this case includes a circular central motif. The Private Dining Room contains a 19th-century marble fireplace, and the Ground Floor Bedroom has a coffered ceiling and a Victorian-baroque fireplace.

The first floor landing has archways similar to those on the ground floor. Leading from this is the Upper Gallery, which contains documents relating to the genealogy of the Bromley-Davenports. Beyond this is the Dorothy Davenport Room and its dressing room. The room gets its name from Dorothy Davenport (1562–1639). She spent 26 years in creating the needlework that is mounted on the Jacobean bed in the room. The work includes the dates of its progress, and depicts, among other subjects, the Garden of Eden and Man's Fall from Paradise. The other rooms on the first floor include the State Bedroom, which contains valuable items of furniture, such as a commode by Boulle, and a pair of encoignures, the State Dressing Room, the American Room, which is decorated with items from Philadelphia, and the Yellow Room, which was the bedroom of Sir William Bromley-Davenport who died in 1949. In the passage outside the American Room is a portrait of the philosopher Jean-Jacques Rousseau by Allan Ramsay.

== Grounds ==
The hall is surrounded by a landscaped park that includes woodland, parkland, lawns, lakes with a boat house, and an arboretum containing 18th-century maple trees. In the grounds are a number of structures of notability and interest.

=== Chapel and chapel gates ===
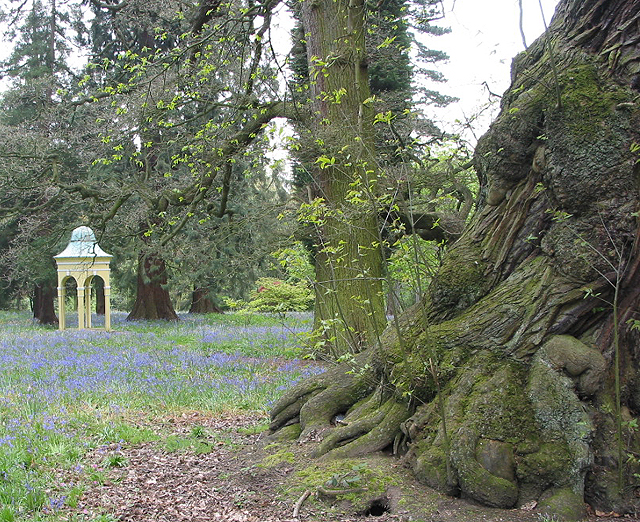
Summer house constructed from the chapel's original bell turret

The chapel was designed by William Smith, and was remodelled in 1887. It is dedicated to the Holy Trinity. (Note: The full dedication is "to the Honour of the Holy and Undivided Trinity".) The chapel is built in brick on a stone plinth with stone dressings and a slate roof, and consists of a three-bay nave and an apsidal chancel, with a bell turret. (Note: The bell turret is not original. It is a replica of the original turret of 1722, and was replaced in 1959.) The doorway and the windows are round-headed, and around the top of the chapel is a cornice and a balustrade with square piers capped by swagged ball finials. Inside the chapel the original box pews were replaced by facing pews in college style. At the west end is a raised family pew. On the walls are terracotta panels by George Tinworth. The reredos is in mosaic with an alabaster surround, it was made by Salviati and is loosely based on Giotto's Dormition. To the southwest of the chapel are gates and gate piers. The gate piers date from the 20th century, and the gates from about 1750. The piers are in brick on stone plinths and have stepped stone caps with ball finials. The gates are in wrought iron and were made in Milan. They are wide with arched centres and contain Rococo panels depicting Saint Andrew with his cross.

=== Other structures ===
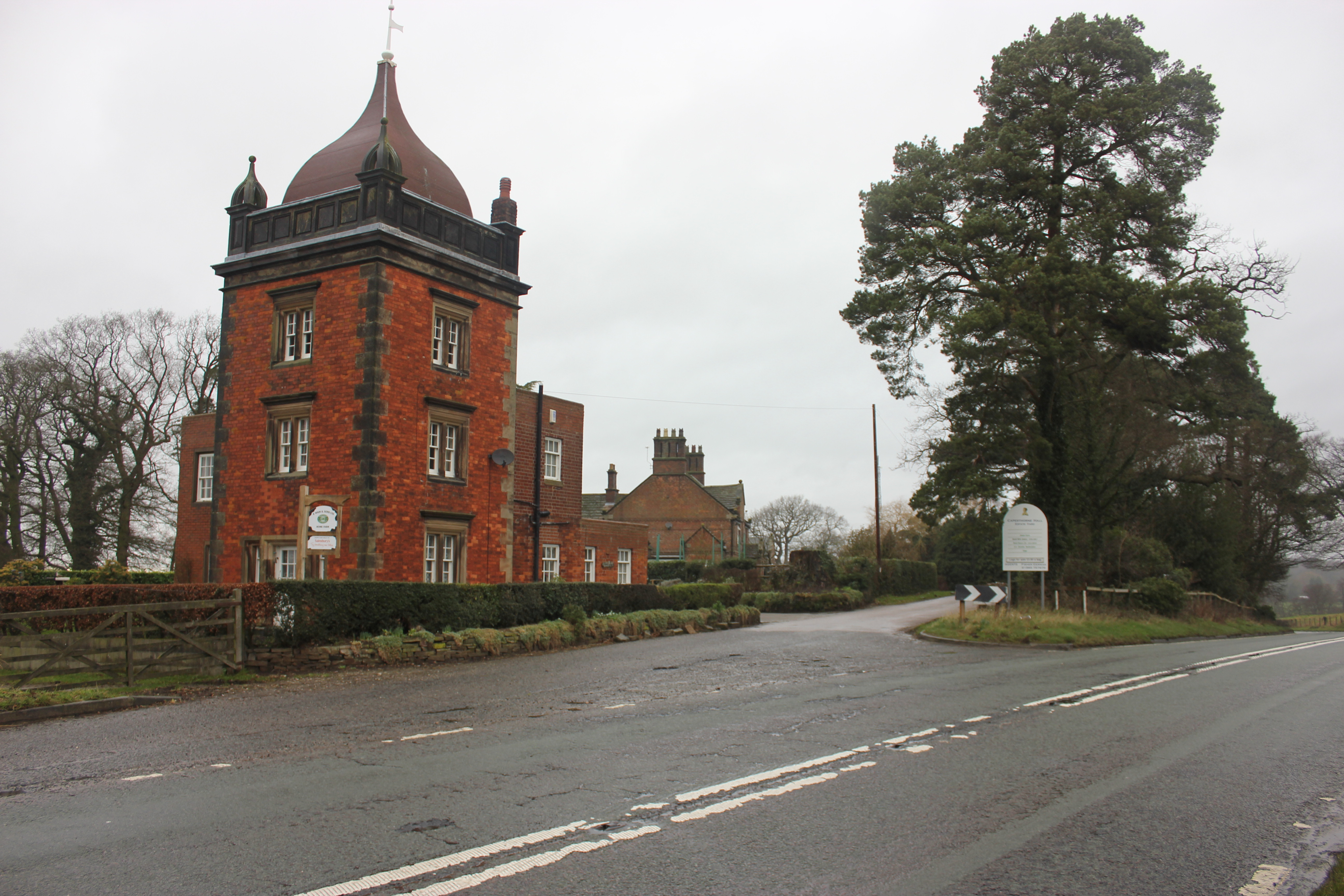
North lodge

The bridge crossing the lake dates from about 1843, and is constructed in brick with stone dressings. It consists of five segmental arches, with abutments running down to the banks. The arches have rusticated voussoirs and keystones, and above the voussoirs are hood moulds. Between the arches are brick pilasters. Along the top of the bridge is a stone balustrade with square piers. Also in the grounds is an icehouse dating from the 18th or early 19th century. It is built in brick and consists of a circular domed chamber. From the arched entrance a barrel vaulted passage leads through a rectangular opening into the chamber. Also in the grounds is a summer house that was formerly the bell turret of the chapel. It carries a gold flag with the date 1722. The lodge at the north entrance to the grounds was designed by Blore and dates from about 1843. It is built in brick with ashlar dressings and has a felt roof. The lodge consists of a three-storey square tower containing two-light mullioned windows. At the top of the tower is an entablature with a panelled parapet and pierced ogee finials on the corners. The roof is ogee-shaped with a ball finial and a flagpole.

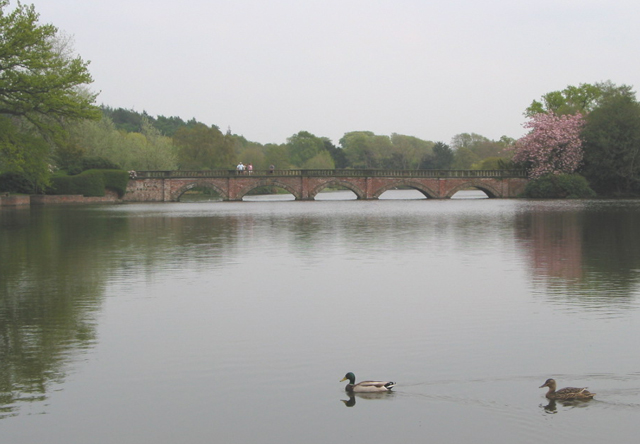
Lake with the bridge

=== Earthworks ===
Although the earlier hall and chapel have long been demolished, earthworks remaining from them are still present, as are those of a nearby deserted medieval village. The platform for the chapel, which measures about 20 metres (65.6 ft) by 6 metres (19.7 ft), is still present. There are extensive earthworks on the site of the hall. To the east of these are the platforms and enclosures of about seven medieval houses, and associated with these is evidence of a medieval field system. All these earthworks are designated together as a scheduled ancient monument.

== Appraisal ==
The hall, together with the wall surrounding the entrance court, and the chapel are recorded in the National Heritage List for England as designated Grade II* listed buildings. Grade II* is the middle of the three grades of listed buildings and is applied to "particularly important buildings of more than special interest". The gate and gate piers associated with the chapel are listed at Grade II, as are the bridge crossing the lake, the ice house, and the north lodge. Grade II is applied to "buildings of national importance and special interest".

De Figueiredo and Treuherz note that when Salvin restored the two wings that each contain two turrets on the front of the hall, he left their tops open on two sides, so that they appear solid from the front but not from the back. Hartwell et al in the Buildings of England series, commenting on the appearance of the hall, say "but it is all front". They note "the thinness of the end parts and the hollowness of the sham towers" and state that the "back is without drama", and conclude that "it is a grand concept executed lamely".

== Present day ==
Capesthorne Hall is a member of the Historic Houses Association, and the hall, chapel and gardens are open to the general public on advertised times between March and October, for which there is an admission charge, and refreshments are available for visitors. The hall and gardens are available to hire for weddings and for corporate events. A programme of events is organised in the hall and in the grounds, where there is a caravan park.

== See also ==
- Grade II* listed buildings in Cheshire East
- Listed buildings in Siddington, Cheshire

== Notes and references ==
Notes

Citations

Sources

- Anon. (1957), Guide to Capesthorne Hall, Capesthorne Hall, OCLC 502086952
- de Figueiredo, Peter; Treuherz, Julian (1988), Cheshire Country Houses, Chichester: Phillimore, ISBN 0-85033-655-4
- Hartwell, Clare; Hyde, Matthew; Hubbard, Edward; Pevsner, Nikolaus (2011) [1971], Cheshire, The Buildings of England, New Haven and London: Yale University Press, ISBN 978-0-300-17043-6
- Radburn, Nicholas James (2009), William Davenport, the Slave Trade, and Merchant Enterprise in Eighteenth-Century Liverpool, Victoria University of Wellington
