= Siddington, Cheshire =

Village in Cheshire, England

Coordinates: 53.235°N 2.237°W

Siddington
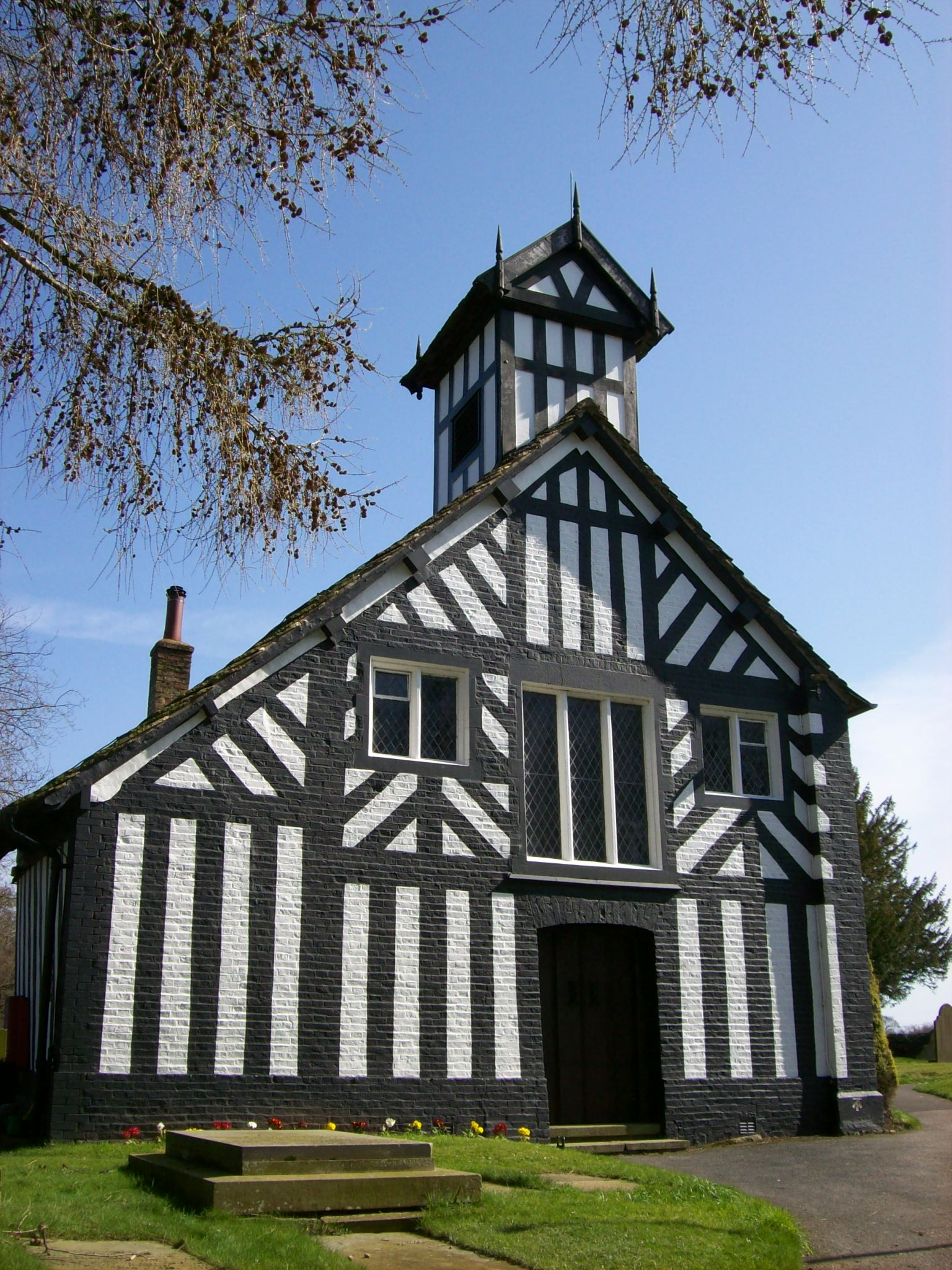
- All Saints' Church, Siddington

- Location within Cheshire
- Population: 357 (2021 census)
- OS grid reference: SJ841710
- Civil parish: Siddington
- Unitary authority: Cheshire East
- Ceremonial county: Cheshire
- Region: North West
- Country: England
- Sovereign state: United Kingdom
- Post town: MACCLESFIELD
- Postcode district: SK11
- Dialling code: 01260
- Police: Cheshire
- Fire: Cheshire
- Ambulance: North West
- UK Parliament: Macclesfield

Siddington is a village and civil parish in Cheshire, England. It consists of farms; a picnic site; Redesmere, a half-mile long lake; and the Capesthorne Estate. The village is at the crossroads of the A34 with the B5392 approximately halfway between Alderley Edge and Congleton. The civil parish includes the hamlet of Capesthorne. In 2021 the parish had a population of 357.

== Redesmere Lake ==
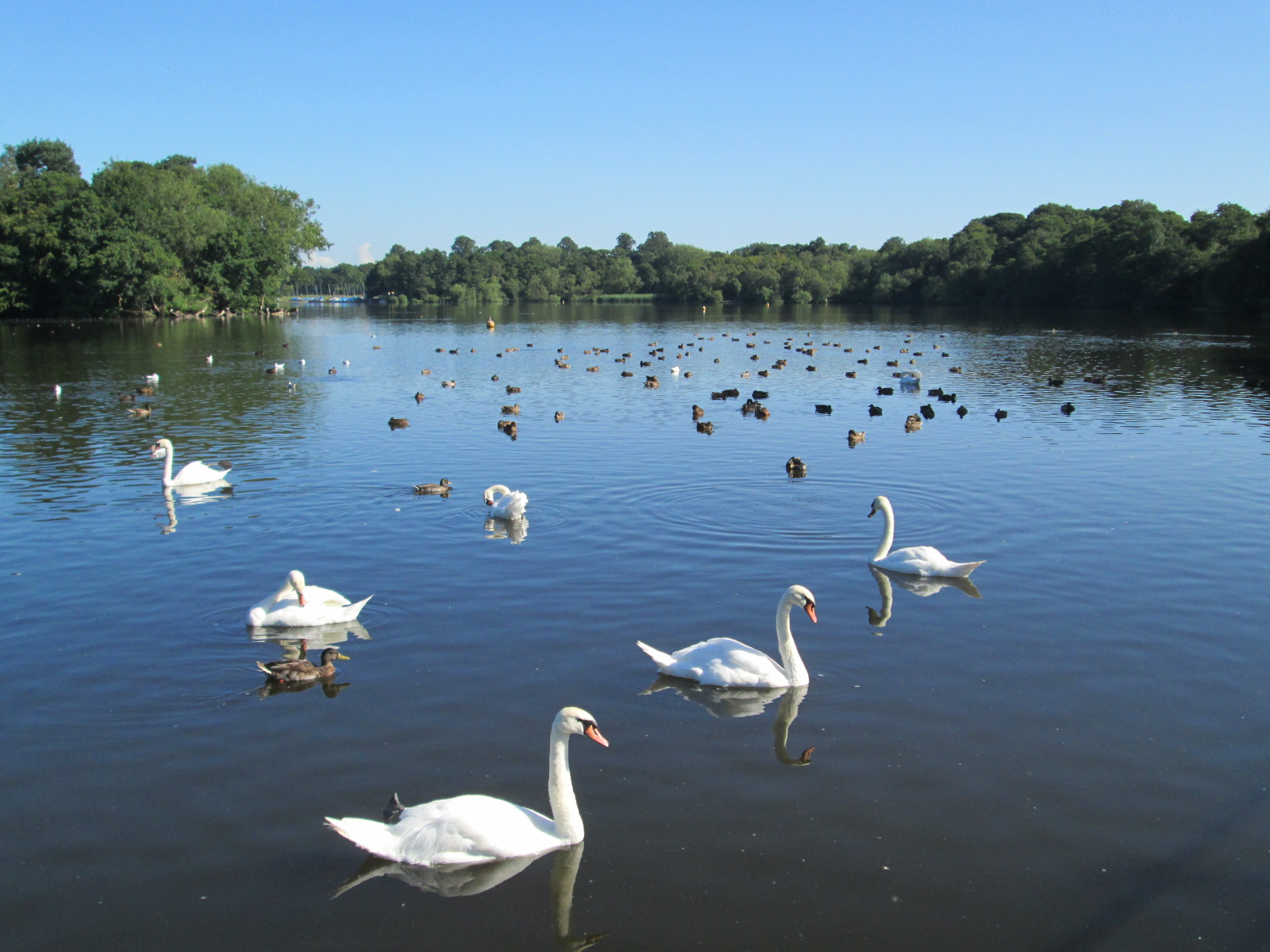
Redesmere

Redesmere, created as a feeder reservoir for the ornamental lakes of Capesthorne Hall in the late 18th century, once had an island. According to popular belief the island floated, and it is marked as such on the 1842 One Inch Ordnance Survey map, though the 1964 1:2500 Ordnance Survey map shows that it had become joined with the bank by then. Local legend says that it came into being as a result of a vow by a knight who believed his lady was unfaithful, and that he would not look on her face again until the island floated. Soon after he fell ill, but she remained loyal to him and nursed him back to health. There then followed a storm which tore the island from the bottom of the lake, and it floated ever since, clearing the lady's name.
The writer Alan Garner included a reference to the Floating Island of Redesmere in his novel The Weirdstone of Brisingamen.

Angling is also popular on the lake but it is strictly controlled by Prince Albert Angling Society. The lake is stocked with carp, pike and various silverfish such as roach and bream.

Redesmere is a popular location for feeding ducks and other water birds, with information, parking and benches next to the water's edge.

Redesmere duck viewing area

== See also ==
- Listed buildings in Siddington, Cheshire
