= List of museums in Cheshire =

In this list of museums in Cheshire, England, museums are defined as institutions (including non-profit organisations, government entities and private businesses) that collect and care for objects of cultural, artistic, scientific or historical interest, and that make their collections or related exhibits available for public viewing. Also included are non-profit art galleries and university art galleries. Museums that exist only in cyberspace (virtual museums) are not included.

Many Cheshire museums focus on the area's industrial heritage, including Quarry Bank Mill in Styal and Clarence Mill in Bollington (cotton), the Macclesfield Museums (silk), the Catalyst Science Discovery Centre in Widnes (chemicals), and the Lion Salt Works in Marston and Weaver Hall Museum in Northwich (salt). The Anson Engine Museum in Poynton is on the site of a former colliery. Jodrell Bank Discovery Centre, on the site of the observatory in Lower Withington, explores astronomy. There are also several transport museums, including the Crewe Heritage Centre (railways), the National Waterways Museum in Ellesmere Port and the Anderton Boat Lift (canals). There are water-powered mills at Bunbury, Nether Alderley and Stretton.

The cities of Chester and Warrington each have a combined museum and art gallery, and the towns of Congleton and Nantwich have local museums. Norton Priory is the remains of an Augustinian abbey, and Englesea Brook Chapel and Museum documents the Primitive Methodist movement. Historic house museums are also represented in the county, including Little Moreton Hall and Lyme Park. Cheshire Military Museum in Chester Castle covers the county's regimental history, and RAF Burtonwood Heritage Centre and Hack Green Secret Nuclear Bunker explore more recent military history. The Museum of Policing in Warrington documents Cheshire's police forces.

== Museums and galleries ==
Name	Image	Location	Type	Summary	Refs
Adlington Hall		Adlington	Historic house	Country house dating in part from the 15th century, with gardens	
Anderton Boat Lift		Anderton	Transportation	Boat lift and visitor centre for the meeting of the River Weaver and Trent and Mersey Canal	
Anson Engine Museum		Poynton	Technology	Collection of stationary engines, blacksmith's smithy and carpentry shop; housed on the site of a former colliery	
Arley Hall		Arley	Historic house	Early Victorian Jacobethan mansion (1833–41) and chapel, with formal gardens and farm	
Bollington Discovery Centre		Bollington	Industry	Local cotton industry, located in Clarence Mill; also canals, local history and art	
Beeston Castle		Beeston	Castle	Ruined 12th Century castle with museum	
Bunbury Mill		Bunbury	Mill	Restored mid-19th-century water-powered mill; also wildlife pool	
Capesthorne Hall		Siddington	Historic house	Jacobean-style house, Georgian Chapel, gardens, parkland	
Catalyst Science Discovery Centre		Widnes	Science	Chemistry, history of the chemical industry	
Cheshire Military Museum		Chester	Military	History of Cheshire's regiments, located in the former barracks at Chester Castle	
Congleton Museum		Congleton	Local	Local history	
Crewe Heritage Centre		Crewe	Railway and Local	Trains, locomotives, signal boxes, miniature railways; located on the site of the Crewe Locomotive Works	
Dewa Roman Experience		Chester	History	Roman British artifacts, reconstructed Roman legionary fortress buildings	
Dorfold Hall		Acton	Historic house	Jacobean house, gardens, woodland	
Dunham Massey Hall		Dunham Massey	Historic House	Grade I listed historic house with extensive gardens and grounds	
Englesea Brook Chapel and Museum		Englesea-Brook	Religious	History of the 19th century working-class religious movement of Primitive Methodism	
Gawsworth Old Hall		Gawsworth	Historic house	Black-and-white timber-framed manor house	
Grosvenor Museum		Chester	Multiple	Roman heritage, art, musical instruments, natural history, Victorian parlour, local history	
Hack Green Secret Nuclear Bunker		Hack Green	Military	Former government-owned nuclear bunker with Cold War and military exhibits	
Hadlow Road railway station		Willaston	Railway museum	Recreation of the station office on the day the station closed, located on the Wirral Way	
Jodrell Bank Discovery Centre		Lower Withington	Science	Lovell radio telescope, planet and space exhibitions, orrery, Solar System model, aboretum	
Lion Salt Works		Marston	Industry	Working open-pan salt works and museum, with rebuilt stove house, salt pan, smithy, engine house and brine tank	
Little Moreton Hall		Congleton	Historic house	Moated 15th-century half-timbered manor house; operated by the National Trust	
Lyme Park		Disley	Historic house	Mansion house with furnished rooms including tapestries and the Lyme Caxton Missal; formal gardens and deer park; operated by the National Trust	
Macclesfield Museums		Macclesfield	Industry	Four museums about the local silk industry, including the Silk Museum on Park Lane, Paradise Mill, Heritage Centre, and the West Park Museum	
Nantwich Museum		Nantwich	Local	Local history including Cheshire's role in the Civil War, local salt, cheese, clothing, shoe and clock-making industries, and art	
National Waterways Museum		Ellesmere Port	Transport	Canal boats, history of the canals	
Nether Alderley Mill		Nether Alderley	Mill	Victorian water-powered corn mill; operated by the National Trust	
Norton Priory Museum		Runcorn	Religious	12–16th-century abbey and 18th-century country house with ruins, archaeological artifacts and medieval history	
Peover Hall		Peover Superior	Historic house	Grade II* listed Elizabethan brick house dating from 1585 and 18th-century landscaped park	
Quarry Bank Mill		Styal	Industry	Former cotton mill and textile museum; operated by the National Trust	
RAF Burtonwood Heritage Centre		Burtonwood	Military	Site of former US air base, with exhibits on life at the base as well as aeroplanes and engines	
Rode Hall and Gardens		Congleton	Historic house	Grade II* listed Georgian country house and gardens	
Stretton Watermill		Stretton	Mill	Working water mill, first recorded in 1351	
Tabley House		Knutsford	Historic house	18th-century Grade I listed house with fine art and furniture collection	
Tatton Hall		Knutsford	Historic house	Part of Tatton Park, early 19th-century house with collections of pictures, books, china, glass, silver and Gillows furniture; operated by the National Trust	
The Museum of Policing in Cheshire		Warrington	Law enforcement	Includes murder weapons, forgeries, pigeon carriers, uniforms, a Doctor Who police box, photographs and records	
Warrington Museum & Art Gallery		Warrington	Multiple	Natural history, local history, archaeology, fine art, decorative arts	
Weaver Hall Museum		Northwich	Multiple	History of salt making, local history, archaeology	

== Defunct museums and galleries ==
- Axis Arts Centre, Crewe (formerly Alsager Arts Centre), included an art gallery, closed in spring 2019
- Chester Toy and Doll Museum, Chester
- Mouldsworth Motor Museum, Mouldsworth, website, closed in 2013
- On The Air: Broadcasting Museum, Chester, closed in 2000
