= Sir Harry Mainwaring, 5th Baronet =

English soldier & actor (1878–1934)

Commander Sir Harry Mainwaring JP Bt
- Born: Henry Stapleton Mainwaring; 25 August 1878; Knutsford, Cheshire, England
- Died: 30 December 1934 (aged 56); Beaumaris, Anglesey, Wales
- Spouse(s): Generis Williams-Bulkeley (m. 1913)
- Children: 2
- Parent(s): Sir Philip Mainwaring, 4th Baronet; Louisa Emily Pitt

Commander Sir Henry Stapleton Mainwaring, 5th Baronet JP (25 August 1878 – 30 December 1934) was an English soldier and actor.

== Early life ==
Mainwaring was born on 25 August 1878 in Knutsford, Cheshire. He was the eldest child of Sir Philip Mainwaring, 4th Baronet (1838–1906) and the former Louisa Emily Pitt, who were first cousins as his mother's mother was the younger sister of his father's father. His parents used to holiday in Biarritz each winter.

His maternal grandparents were the Rev. George Pitt and Charlotte Augusta Mainwaring (a daughter of Sir Henry Mainwaring, 1st Baronet). His paternal grandparents were Emma Tatton and Sir Harry Mainwaring, 2nd Baronet. Sir Harry's father, the 4th baronet, succeeded to the baronetcy upon the death of his elder brother, Sir Stapleton Mainwaring, 3rd Baronet.

== Career ==
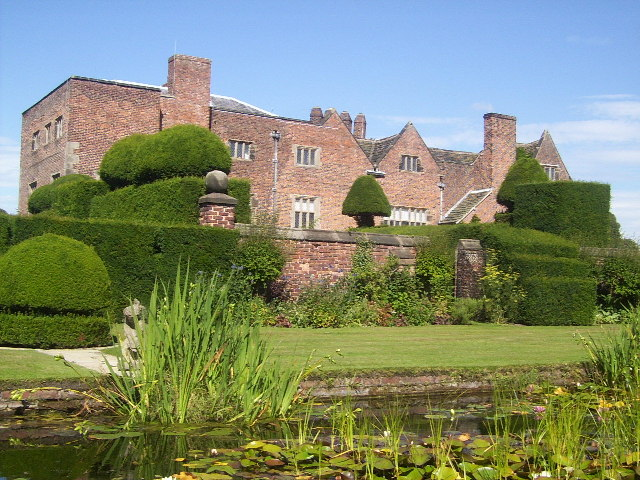
The Mainwaring family seat, Peover Hall

Upon the death of his father in 1906, he succeeded as the 5th Mainwaring Baronet of Over-Peover (today known as Peover Superior), Cheshire. The baronetcy had first been created in 1660 by Charles II on his restoration, for Thomas Mainwaring, High Sheriff of Cheshire in 1657 and Knight of the Shire otherwise MP for Cheshire. The baronetcy became extinct on the death of the 4th Baronet in 1797, however, his widow remarried and her son by the second marriage Thomas Weterall eventually inherited the Mainwaring Cheshire estate and changed his surname to Mainwaring. The baronetcy was recreated in the Baronetage of the United Kingdom on 26 May 1804 for Henry Mainwaring, son of Thomas Weterall Mainwaring.

In 1919, Sir Harry sold the family seat, Peover Hall, in Peover Superior, to John Graham Peel, the son of a Manchester cotton merchant, who already owned Colshaw Hall in Peover Superior. "In June 1919, the contents of Peover Hall were offered for sale by public auction under the direction of Mr Peel."

Sir Harry was a Justice of the Peace and a commander of the Royal Naval Volunteer Reserve from the beginning of World War I until 1921. In Shortly before his death, he played a small part in the comedy film Orders Is Orders.

== Personal life ==
In 1913, Mainwaring was married to Generis Alma Windham Williams-Bulkeley (1889–1946), a daughter of Sir Richard Williams-Bulkeley, 12th Baronet and Lady Magdalen Yorke (a daughter of Charles Yorke, 5th Earl of Hardwicke). Together, they were the parents of two daughters:

- Diana Eira Claude Mainwaring (1914–1992), who married Capt. Roger Edward Lennox Harvey.
- Zara Sophie Kathleen Mary Mainwaring (1917–2004), who married Hon. Ronald Strutt, in 1940. They divorced in 1949 (before Strutt became the 4th Baron Belper) and she married Peter Victor Ferdinand Cazalet, trainer of horses for Queen Elizabeth The Queen Mother.

Sir Harry died on 30 December 1934 at Pen-y-Parc, Beaumaris, Anglesey in Wales, the residence of his father-in-law. The baronetcy became extinct on the death of Sir Harry in 1934.

=== Descendants ===
Through his elder daughter Diana, he was posthumously a grandfather of Carola Zara Lennox Harvey (who married John Gerald Robertson Williams, only son of Gerald Williams) Joanna Lennox Harvey (who married Frederick Minshull Stockdale, son of Sir Edmund Stockdale, 1st Baronet), and Fiona Diana Lennox Harvey (who married John Jacob Astor VIII, eldest son of Gavin Astor, 2nd Baron Astor of Hever).

Through his younger daughter Zara, he was posthumously a grandfather of Richard Strutt, 5th Baron Belper.

Baronetage of the United Kingdom
Preceded by Philip Tatton Mainwaring	Baronet (of Over-Peover); 1906–1934	Extinct
