= Sir John Mainwaring, 2nd Baronet =

English politician

Sir John Mainwaring, 2nd Baronet DL (8 May 1656 – 4 November 1702) was an English politician who sat in the House of Commons from 1689 to 1702.

Mainwaring was the son of Sir Thomas Mainwaring, 1st Baronet of Peover Hall and his wife Mary Delves, daughter of Sir Henry Delves, 2nd Baronet, of Dodington.

Mainwaring succeeded to the baronetcy on the death of his father in 1689. In that year he was elected Member of Parliament for Cheshire and held the seat until his death in 1702.

Mainwaring died at the age of 46 and was laid to rest at Over Peover. He had married Elizabeth, eldest daughter of Roger Whitley of Peel, Cheshire and had several sons and daughters. He was succeeded in the baronetcy by his eldest surviving son Thomas.

Baronetage of England
Preceded by Thomas Mainwaring	Baronet (of Over-Peover); 1689–1702	Succeeded by Thomas Mainwaring
