= Listed buildings in Peover Superior =

Peover Superior is a former civil parish in Cheshire East, England. It contained 29 buildings that are recorded in the National Heritage List for England as designated listed buildings. Of these, two are listed at Grade I, the highest grade, one is listed at Grade II*, the middle grade, and the others are at Grade II. The parish was mainly rural, and most of the listed buildings are houses of various sizes, farmhouses, cottages, and associated structures. The other listed buildings include a church with associated structures, a former water mill, a railway viaduct, and a mile post.

== Key ==
Grade	Criteria
I	Buildings of exceptional interest, sometimes considered to be internationally important
II*	Particularly important buildings of more than special interest
II	Buildings of national importance and special interest

== Buildings ==
Name and location	Photograph	Date	Notes	Grade
Cross and cross base 53.25806°N 2.34301°W	Churchyard cross, St Lawrence's, Peover	15th century	The cross is in the churchyard of St Lawrence's Church. The oldest part is the base, and the cross was added to the base in 1907. It is in stone, and consists of three steps with a square plinth. The shaft is octagonal and carries a canopy over a cross and two figures of saints. The structure is also a scheduled monument.	II
Sundial; 53.25810°N 2.34320°W	Sundial in churchyard St Lawrence, Peover	15th century	The sundial is in the churchyard of St Lawrence's Church. The oldest part is the octagonal shaft which was originally part of the churchyard cross. It was converted into a sundial in the 19th century, placing it on two square steps. The dial and gnomon are missing.	II
St Lawrence's Church; 53.25820°N 2.34310°W	St Lawrence's Church, Over Peover	1456	The oldest part of the church is the south chapel, and the north chapel dates from 1648. The tower was built in 1739, and the nave and chancel were rebuilt in 1811. The chapels are in stone, and the tower and the rest of the church are in brick with stone dressings and a tiled roof. In the church are memorials to the Mainwaring family.	I
Peover Hall; 53.25803°N 2.34217°W	Peover Hall	1585	A country house with a sequence of additions and alterations. In 1964 one of the wings was in a poor condition, and was demolished, with the formation of a new entrance. The hall is built in brick with stone dressings, it has a tiled roof, and is in two and three storeys. The windows are mullioned and tramsomed.	II*
Bate Mill House; 53.24801°N 2.30068°W	—	Mid-17th century	The house is timber-framed and was refaced in brick in the early 19th century. It is in two storeys, and has a slate roof. On the front are three casement windows on each floor and a doorway to the right of centre. On the right gabled side the timber-framing is exposed; it has brick infill and is on a stone plinth.	II
Newhall; 53.26866°N 2.33429°W	—	Mid-17th century	Originating as a farmhouse, the house is in brick with stone dressings and a slate roof. It is in two storeys, with a half-basement and an attic. The house has an H-shaped plan, with a recessed centre flanked by gabled wings. The entrance front is rendered, and seven steps lead up to the central doorway.	II
Peover Hall Stable Block; 53.25710°N 2.34125°W	—	1654	This was built as a birthday gift to Thomas Mainwaring from his mother. A first floor was added in the 18th century, and there have been further additions since. It is built in brick with stone dressings and has a tiled roof, and is in two storeys. The interior is elaborately decorated, the stalls being divided by an arcade of Tuscan columns, and the ceiling is also highly decorated.	I
The Cottage; 53.26196°N 2.32253°W	—	Mid- to late 17th century	A timber-framed house on a rendered plinth with rendered infill and a slate roof. It is in two storeys, with casement windows in the lower floor and dormers in the upper floor. There is a three-light window in the right gable.	II
Farm building, Batemill Farm; 53.24933°N 2.30073°W	—	Mid- to late 17th century	There have been additions and alterations to the farm building in the 19th and 20th centuries. It is partly timber-framed with brick infill, and partly in brick, and has a corrugated iron roof.	II
Foxwood Farmhouse; 53.24864°N 2.31362°W	—	Mid- to late 17th century	The farmhouse was extended with the addition of a front range in the 18th century. This is built in brick with a slate roof, and has a symmetrical entrance front with three bays. The central bay projects forward, contains a doorway with a keystone, a datestone, and is gabled. The rear 17th-century wing is timber-framed on a stone plinth. The garden wall and stone gate piers are included in the listing.	II
Hunger Hill Farmhouse; 53.25626°N 2.31585°W	—	Late 17th century	The farmhouse was altered and extended in the 20th century. It is timber-framed with brick infill on a brick and stone plinth. The house consists of a single-storey section in one cell, with a two-storey section in three cells to the right. The 20th-century extension is further to the right. The windows are casements.	II
The Kennels; 53.25470°N 2.34069°W	—	Late 17th century	A brick house with a slate roof, it is in two storeys with an attic. On the front is a gabled porch and a dormer. The windows are casements.	II
Outbuilding, Millbank Farm; 53.25125°N 2.36389°W	—	Late 17th century	The farm building is timber-framed with whitewashed brick infill on a stone plinth. It has a slate roof and is in a single storey. The building was extended in the 19th century in brick painted to simulate timber-framing.	II
Farm building, Foxwood Farm; 53.24884°N 2.31392°W	—	Late 17th to early 18th century	The farm building is in brick with a tiled roof in two storeys. In the lower storey are two doors and two windows, and above are another window, a square pitch hole, and ventilation holes. On the left side a staircase leads to a door in the upper floor.	II
Cheers Green Farmhouse; 53.25941°N 2.37384°W	—	1720	A brick farmhouse with a slate roof, in two storeys with an attic. It has a two-bay front, with the doorway to the right of centre, and a datestone above. The windows are casements.	II
Free Green Farmhouse; 53.26298°N 2.37401°W	—	c. 1720	A brick farmhouse with a slate roof, it is in three storeys, and has an entrance front of four bays. At the sides are square turrets with pyramidal roofs. The windows are casements.	II
Peover Hall Farm; 53.25690°N 2.34353°W	—	Early 18th century	The farmhouse is in brick with a slate roof. It is in two storeys with an attic, and has a two-bay front. There is a central doorway, with casement windows in the lower and upper storeys. In the attic is a gabled dormer containing a sash window. At the rear is a semi-octagonal bay window.	II
Park Farmhouse; 53.25860°N 2.33199°W	—	1729	A brick farmhouse with a slate roof, it is in two storeys with an attic. The entrance front has a slate-faced plinth and a central lean-to porch. The windows are casements. In the left gable apex is a stone inscribed with the date and initials.	II
Redbroke Farmhouse; 53.27123°N 2.35764°W	—	Early to mid-18th century	A brick farmhouse with a slate roof, it is in three storeys. In the centre is doorway with a fanlight and at the top of the house a shallow gable with a round window. Most of the other windows are sashes. There is a later single-storey outbuilding to the left. Inside the house is some timber-framing.	II
Bate Mill; 53.24827°N 2.30001°W	Bate Mill	18th century	A former watermill that was extended in the 19th and 20th centuries. It is built in brick with a stone-slate roof, and is in two storeys. The road front is divided into three bays by pilasters, and it contains three casement windows. On the right side is a double door above which is a loft door and a pulley, and on the left side is an external staircase leading to a doorway.	II
Coach House, Peover Hall; 53.25728°N 2.34180°W	Coach House, Peover Hall	Mid-18th century	The former coach house is built in brick on a stone plinth with stone dressings and a slate roof. It is in two storeys and has a nine-bay front, the central three bays projecting forward under a pediment containing a clock face. In the lower storey are carriage openings and sash windows, and in the upper floor are circular windows. On the roof is a cupola.	II
Gates and gate piers 53.25722°N 2.34066°W	Gatepiers, Peover Hall	Mid-18th century	The gates and gate piers were brought from Alderley Park and stand near the coach house of Peover Hall. There are two pairs of gate piers, the larger in the centre with double gates, and a smaller pair to the outside with pedestrian gates. The piers are square, in stone, with entablatures surmounted by ball finials on pyramids. The gates are in wrought iron and in rococo style.	II
Mounting block 53.25748°N 2.34209°W	—	Mid-18th century	The mounting block is near the coach house of Peover Hall. It is in stone, and consists of a central block with five steps on each side.	II
Knutsford Lodge; 53.26846°N 2.35004°W	—	Early 19th century	The lodge to Peover Hall is in rendered brick with a slate roof. It is in a single storey, and has knotted tree trunks at the angles. The windows have pointed arches, and contain Y-tracery and casement windows.	II
Mile post 53.25237°N 2.36703°W	—	c. 1830	The mile post is in cast iron and consists of a circular post with an acorn finial. It carries a curved plate inscribed with the name of the parish, and the distances in miles to Knutsford and Holmes Chapel.	II
Railway viaduct 53.24774°N 2.30400°W	Peover Viaduct	c. 1842	The viaduct carries the railway over the valley of the Peover Eye. It is built in brick with stone dressings, and consists of ten semicircular arches. Six of the piers are full, and the others are set into an embankment.	II
Colshaw Hall; 53.26575°N 2.32777°W	Colshaw Hall	1903	A country house designed by Douglas and Minshull in Tudor style, and extended by Percy Worthington in 1907. It is built in brick with stone dressings and a slate roof, and is in two storeys with an attic. The house has a complex plan, with gabled wings. Its features include mullioned casement windows, oriel windows, bay windows and dormers. The main doorway has a stone semicircular arch.	II
Wall and pavilions, Radbroke Hall; 53.27095°N 2.34840°W	—	c. 1910	Designed by Percy Worthington, the garden wall with pavilions at the ends are in stone. The wall is about 10 feet (3.0 m) high, and contains piers and buttresses. The pavilions are square with pyramidal roofs. Inside them the floors are flagged, the ceilings have moulded cornices, and are domed.	II
Radbroke Hall; 53.27105°N 2.34961°W	—	1914–17	A country house designed by Percy Worthington, built in stone with hipped tile roofs. Its plan consists of three sides of a courtyard. The central block in two storeys with attics, and is joined to single-storey pavilions by single-storey wings. At the entrance is a portico with four unfluted Roman Ionic columns on a stylobate, its pediment containing a coat of arms. At the top of the house is a modillion cornice. The windows are sashes. The house has later become the centre of an office complex.	II

== See also ==
- Listed buildings in Toft
- Listed buildings in Ollerton
- Listed buildings in Marthall
- Listed buildings in Snelson
- Listed buildings in Lower Withington
- Listed buildings in Goostrey
- Listed buildings in Allostock
- Listed buildings in Nether Peover
- Listed buildings in Peover Inferior
