= Mainwaring baronets of Over-Peover (second creation, 1804) =

Extinct baronetcy

Escutcheon of the Mainwaring baronets (second creation)

The Mainwaring baronetcy of Over-Peover was created for the second time, on 26 May 1804 in the Baronetage of the United Kingdom, for Henry Mainwaring ne Wetenhall, son of Thomas Mainwaring ne Wetenhall.

The first creation of the baronetcy became extinct in 1797, on the death of Sir Henry Mainwaring, 4th Baronet. His mother had remarried and her son by the second marriage, Thomas Wetenhall (1736–1798), inherited the Mainwaring Cheshire estate on the death of his half-brother; he changed his surname to Mainwaring. His son Henry Mainwaring became the first baronet of the second creation.

== Mainwaring baronets of Over-Peover (1804) ==
- Sir Henry Mainwaring, 1st Baronet (1782–1860)
- Sir Harry Mainwaring, 2nd Baronet (1804–1875)
- Sir Stapleton Thomas Mainwaring, 3rd Baronet (1837–1878)
- Sir Phillip Tatton Mainwaring, 4th Baronet (1838–1906)
- Sir Henry Stapleton Mainwaring, 5th Baronet (1878–1934). The title became extinct on his death.

== Notes ==
Baronetage of the United Kingdom
| Preceded by Sullivan baronets | Mainwaring baronets of Over-Peover; 26 May 1804 | Succeeded by Gordon-Cumming baronets |
