= Listed buildings in Weston, Cheshire East =

Weston is a former civil parish in Cheshire East, England. It contained 17 buildings that are recorded in the National Heritage List for England as designated listed buildings. Of these, one is listed at Grade II*, the middle of the three grades, and the others are at Grade II. The parish contained the villages of Weston and Englesea-Brook, and the southern part of the Crewe Hall estate. The listed buildings include houses, cottages and a lodge in the Crewe estate.. Elsewhere there are houses and cottages, a public house, a church, and a signpost. In Englesea-Brook the former Primitive Methodist church is now a museum, and its founder has a memorial in the churchyard opposite.

== Key ==
Grade	Criteria
II*	Particularly important buildings of more than special interest
II	Buildings of national importance and special interest

== Buildings ==
Name and location	Photograph	Date	Notes	Grade
Hollyhedge Farmhouse; 53.07458°N 2.39941°W	—	Late 16th to early 17th century	A timber-framed farmhouse with rendered infill on a stone plinth, and it has a tiled roof. It consists of a hall and a cross-wing, and is in two storeys, the upper floor being slightly jettied. The windows are casements. Inside the house is an inglenook and timber-framed partition walls.	II*
41 Main Road; 53.06734°N 2.39994°W	—	17th century	A house that is partly timber-framed and partly in brick, with a tiled roof. It is in two storeys. The north front is timber-framed on a rendered plinth, and contains two dormers. The gabled east end has timber framing in the gable, the panels being decorated with coats of arms and the date 1881. The windows are casements.	II
Barn and Elder Cottages; 53.06757°N 2.39802°W		17th century	Originally a farmhouse, later converted into two dwellings, it is a timber-framed building on a stone plinth with whitewashed brick infill and a tiled roof. It is in two storeys, and on the front are two gabled porches. The windows are casements, those in the upper storey in dormers.	II
Gentian Cottage; 53.06741°N 2.39935°W	—	17th century	A timber-framed house with rendered infill on a rendered plinth with a tiled roof. It is in two storeys, and has a lean-to on the right side.	II
Red Lion Farmhouse; 53.06881°N 2.39902°W	—	17th century	Originally a timber-framed farmhouse, it was extensively rebuilt in the 19th century. It is mainly in brick, and has a tiled roof. The house is in two storeys, and has a three-bay front. To the left of centre is a gabled porch, and in the centre of the house is a gabled half-dormer. The windows are casements. On the left side is some exposed timber-framing, and inside the house is an inglenook.	II
White Lion Inn; 53.06615°N 2.39988°W		1652	A timber-framed public house with rendered infill and a slate roof in two storeys. It consists of a hall with a cross-wing. The north front has a gabled wing to the left with a slightly jettied upper floor. To the right of this is a later brick porch painted to resemble timber-framing. At the left is a 20th-century extension.	II
Methodist Chapel and Sunday School; 53.05987°N 2.37142°W		1828	An early chapel in Englesea-Brook for Primitive Methodism. It was altered in 1832, the school was added in 1914, and the complex was converted for use as a museum in 1986. It is built in brick with stone dressings. The chapel is in two storeys, and has a symmetrical two-bay front with sash windows. The attached former Sunday school is in a single storey, and has a gabled porch.	II
All Saints' Church; 53.06667°N 2.40030°W		c. 1840	The church was probably designed by Edward Lapidge, and the chancel was added in 1893. It is built in brick with stone dressings and has a tiled roof. It consists of a nave, a west porch, a chancel with an apsidal east end, and a northeast vestry. On the west gable is a single bellcote. The chancel windows contain stained glass by Morris & Co.	II
Weston House; 53.06693°N 2.40058°W	—	1841	Originally a vicarage, this is a brick house with stone dressings. It is in two storeys with an attic, and has coped gables with finials. The windows are casements with Tudor hood moulds. Above the gabled porch is a diamond-shaped datestone.	II
Beech Tree, Elm Tree, Oak Tree, and Walnut Tree Cottages; 53.07709°N 2.40052°W	—	19th century	A terrace of four cottages in whitewashed brick with tiled roofs. They are in two and three storeys, and have fronts with gables or gabled dormers. Each cottage has a gabled porch. The windows are casements, with one canted oriel window.	II
Monument to Hugh Bourne; 53.05999°N 2.37210°W		1852	The monument is in the churchyard of the Methodist Chapel. It commemorates Hugh Bourne, one of the founders of Primitive Methodism. It is in ashlar stone with lettering in lead. The monument consists of a square base with stepped buttresses and obelisk finials on the corners, and a large obelisk in the centre. The inscription records the life and achievements of Bourne.	II
Golden Gates Lodge and entrance screen 53.07695°N 2.40246°W		Before 1865	The lodge is at the southern entrance to Crewe Hall. It is built in red brick with blue brick diapering and stone dressings and has a slate roof. The lodge is in two storeys. The road front is gabled and contains a two-storey canted bay window. The drive front has a gabled wing and a single-storey bay window. The windows are mullioned or mullioned and transomed. The entrance screen to the left consists of brick walling and four decorative piers.	II
Firtree Cottage; 53.07889°N 2.41210°W	—	1865	A house designed by W. E. Nesfield in brick with some tile-hanging and tiled roofs. It has a complex plan and is in two storeys. The entrance front has a projecting wing with a square bay window and a jettied upper floor. The windows are casements. The house is decorated in pargeting with sunflower, floral and rising sun motifs, initials and the date. There is also decoration with the necks and bottoms of green glass bottles.	II
Magnolia and Stowford Cottages; 53.07663°N 2.40100°W		1865	A pair of semi-detached houses designed by W. E. Nesfield. They are built in brick with some tile-hanging and tiled roofs. The houses are in two storeys, and have a recessed centre containing a porch and doorways. Above them are hipped dormers with mullioned windows. Flanking these are projecting gabled wings with jettied upper floors. The ground floor windows are casements, and in the upper floor are oriel windows.	II
Smithy and Smithy Cottage; 53.07675°N 2.40041°W	—	c. 1865	The house and attached former smithy were designed by W. E. Nesfield. They are built in brick with some applied clapboarding and have tiled roofs. The house is in two storeys, the upper storey being jettied, and the smithy has a single storey. The jetty is decorated with five panels of pargeting with a sunflower motif. The windows are casements.	II
Stowford Lodge; 53.07740°N 2.40011°W	—	1879	A brick house with a tiled roof, it is in a single storey. On the entrance front is a projecting wing with a jettied gable, the gable containing applied timber-framing, and beneath this is a canted bay window. To the left of the wing is a porch under a catslide roof. There is another timber-framed gable on the left side.	II
Signpost; 53.06906°N 2.41065°W	—	Late 19th to early 20th century	The signpost is in cast iron and consists of an octagonal post with a finial. It carries four sign boards that indicate the directions to Croatia Mill, to Crewe, to Weston, and to Shavington and Nantwich.	II
