= Mary Anne Cust =

British scientific illustrator and author (1799–1882)

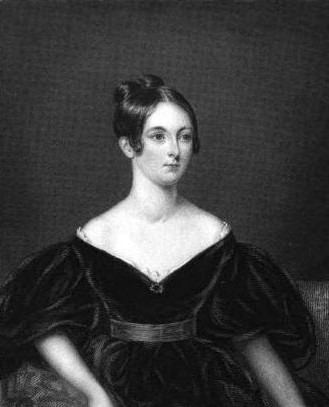
Mary Anne Cust, 1836 engraving

Mary Anne Cust, Lady Cust (née Boode; 23 September 1799 – 19 July 1882) was a British naturalist, scientific illustrator and writer of The Invalid’s Own Book and History and Diseases of the Cat.

== Life ==
Mary Anne Cust (née Boode) was born on 23 September 1799 in Over Peover, Cheshire, England. She was the only child of Lewis William Boode of Amsterdam and Peover Hall and Margaret Dannett. Cust's father was a member of a leading family of British Guiana slave-owners and their plantations in the West Indies is where the Boode family made their fortunes. Her grandfather, Johan Berend Christoffer Frederick Boode, owned five plantations in Demerara and Essequibo growing coffee and sugarcane. One of these plantations was Greenwich Park, Demerara. Her mother was the daughter of Reverend Thomas Dannett who was a principal landowner in Wavertree, Liverpool

Shortly after she was born, in 1800, Cust's father died. In 1802 her mother purchased Mockbeggar Hall, Wallasey, Cheshire and renamed it Leasowe Castle, "the Castle". Cust's mother made significant additions and improvements to the Castle and this was where Cust grew up. It is interesting to note that, in 1815, the first St. Bernard dog brought to England found a home at the Castle. Cust was an excellent horsewoman. At the main entrance of the Castle is a mounting stone ‘which stands as a reminder of the fact Miss Boode (Lady Cust) was an excellent horsewoman’.

In 1817 her mother took ownership of the estate Greenwich Park, Demerara and in 1821 Cust married Edward Cust. In 1824 Cust took her Uncle, Andreas Christian Boode, to court over her inheritance from her father of her grandfather's estates. Her grandfather had died before she was born and her father had died when she was an infant. Her uncle argued that Cust had received her entitlement according to a settlement with her guardians when she was an infant: 'In Holland', her uncle argued, 'a settlement by guardians bound the interests of the infant'. The Court agreed.

Her mother died after a fall from her carriage in 1826 and Cust, as sole heir, inherited the Castle and Greenwich Park. Initially, Cust and her husband converted the Castle into a hotel, which was leased to and run by her mother's ex-gardener, but the venture was unsuccessful. So, the Custs took up residence making many further additions and alterations to it. They picked up on a local tradition that on the shoreline, somewhere near the Castle, King Canute undertook his famous attempt to turn back the waves and they placed an oak chair at the bottom of the Castle garden overlooking the sea, the so-called Canute Chair, with the words 'Sea come not hither nor wet the sole of my foot' carved on the back.

In spite of certain eccentricities, Lady C – was an eminently charitable woman, as many a humble cottager could testify. The Birkenhead Hospital…she was a constant visitor, and gave ample evidence of her kind heart in the bountiful and useful gifts she made to the institution. – Hilda Gemlin

One such gift was the proceeds of two Angola cats for sale at the Manchester and Liverpool Agricultural Show. Gemlin continues, ‘Her ladyship had a mania for cats, and would have as many as a hundred or more living together in harmony in a building adjoining the Castle’.

The Castle remained in the Cust family until 1895. As well as in England and West Indies, they had residences in ‘the Spanish Main’ (Spanish South America) and North America. Sir Edward was a member of the Canterbury Association which was formed in order to establish a colony in the South Island of New Zealand.

During the years 1830–1840, Cust was woman of the bedchamber to H.R.H. Duchess of Kent, Queen Victoria's mother. In 1831 her husband was knighted and in 1876 Sir Edward was made a baronet. Consequently, she became Lady Cust or The Honourable Lady Cust. Cust had six daughters and one son. Their son, Sir Leopold, was named after his godfather King Leopold I of Belgium to whom Sir Edward had been equerry. In 1843 her eldest daughter, Louisa, died and in 1846 her youngest daughter, Henrietta, aged 18, died. Cust carved with her own hands a butterfly on a large wooden cross as a memorial to Henrietta which was placed in the Bidston Church. Many years later, in 1865, Cust's surviving children donated a window to Bidston Church in memory of their two sisters. Sir Edward died in London in 1878.

Cust composed a hymn, Whitsunday - No.III, which was included in a compilation, by Reverend Henry Hart Milman, of psalms and hymns to be used in the Church of St. Margaret's, Westminster. And, she donated money to the Society for the Conversion and Religious Instruction and Education of the Negro Slaves in the British West India Islands.

Cust was grandmother to Aleen Cust who is considered to be the first female trained veterinary surgeon in Britain. Aleen attributed her own love of animals to Cust and wrote of her grandmother:

She would go on an annual voyage to her villa in Madeira with her favourite persian cat in a basket secured with 5 padlocks. She studied the breeding habits of chameleons & wrote a brochure on them (not as yet traced). She drove a carriage with 2 Dalmatians running under it. She would doctor her own horses and had ivory-handled surgical instruments in shagreen cases for the purpose. She once shot 6 of her own horses before one of her voyages to avoid them falling into 'bad hands'. – Aleen Cust, 1934

One such carriage dog became the subject of a court case. Cust went into the drapery store and left her carriage and her dog on the street outside. While she was inside the store, the police caught a man on the street carrying her dog. The police arrested him for stealing the dog. At the court hearing, the accused claimed that he was not stealing but rather had picked the dog up as it had strayed. Sir Edward was asked to attend the hearing as a witness to identify the dog. But, Sir Edward ‘proceeded to adjudicate in the case’ ’and as presiding magistrate’ questioned the dogstealer ‘in the usual way’. He then, after consulting his ‘brother Magistrates’ sentenced the accused to 14 days hard labour. Later the Home Secretary overturned the sentence, and although no official comment was made for the reason it was believed to be, because Sir Edward's ‘conduct in taking part in the hearing of the case was illegal’.

Cust died on 19 July 1882, aged 82, at Leasowe Castle and was buried at Bidston Church. A few months after Cust's death, the large vault, erected in 1846 on the ground floor of the tower of Bidston Church for the interment of the members of the Cust family, was removed. The body of Henrietta was reburied in Cust's grave in the churchyard.

== Career ==
=== Naturalist ===
She presented a variety of living specimens to the Zoological Society of London: a Civet Cat from Africa; an Albino Brown Rat and a Hanover Rat from Europe; Bronze-Spotted Doves and an Occipital Lizard from West Africa; a Purple Gallinule from South-western Europe and Algeria; and, a Common Quail from the British Islands.

She donated specimens for the Aquarium at the Derby Museum and to the Free Public Museum (Liverpool): a young Chameleon (one of seven born alive but died a few days later); and, nests of the Zebra Spider from Madeira.

She had a collection of eggs of British birds which was described as ‘near perfect’ and was said to be ‘superior to that in the British Museum’. In forming this collection she made exchanges with the Earl of Derby and William Yarrell F.L.S., an eminent ornithologist, assisted in classifying them.

She not only collected specimens relating to fauna but also flora. She had a habit of bringing home foreign plants for cultivation in the grounds surrounding Leasowe Castle. In 1885 Brass Buttons (Cotula Coronopifolia) was found in a ditch near the Leasowe Lighthouse. It was suspected that Cust unintentionally introduced it to Cheshire.

=== Scientific Illustrator ===
We may state that not only has Lady CUST procured a collection of those curiosities that are the result of the skill and ingenuity of other people, but she has superadded a valuable collection of drawings of the scenery and especially of the plants of the West Indies, which may be of much use to aid researches of such as may hereafter be deputed to gather information as to the floral and horticultural produce of the West India Islands. - The Liverpool Mercury

She is known for her botanical, natural, and ichthyological drawings in watercolor. The British Museum holds three volumes of her illustrations containing 205 drawings of plants and fishes made during her voyages.

These volumes comprise watercolour drawings of flowers, fruit, fish and marine invertebrates painted by Cust while on tour of the West Indies during January–July 1839 with detailed captions by her husband, Sir Edward; and, paintings of flowers, fruit, fish and marine invertebrates painted by Cust while in Tenerife and Madeira during 1866–1874.

=== Author ===
She wrote several books including The Invalid’s Own Book and History and Diseases of the Cat.

The Invalid’s own book is a collection of recipes from various books and various countries and dedicated to the Duchess of Kent.

Many of the recipes were collected for the use of a beloved suffering member of my own family, since deceased…by whose bedside the midnight hours were beguiled in compiling them - The Honourable Lady Cust

Cust wrote the first book on cat care, History and Diseases of the Cat, which was published in 1856 and dedicated it to her friend Professor Richard Owen F.R.S.

At last the cat has been promoted to the literary honours which have so long been her due, and so long been delayed. She has had an entire book written about her, all to herself, by the Honourable Lady Cust. - The Sydney Morning Herald

The book is 31 pages long and some considered it presumptuous. It acknowledges the low status of cats at that time. Their omission from written volumes on animal treatment suggested to Cust that ‘the cat is not considered worthy of notice, or its life worth preserving’. Cust emphasised that cleanliness made them ‘nice household pets’. It includes suggestions on how to administer medicine and, generally, Cust advised treating a cat like a contemporary ‘human subject’ with similar medication, such as laudanum, and making the animal patient comfortable and warm by a fire.

== Works ==
Among her works are:

- The Invalid's Own Book: Receipts for Food and Drink (1853)
- History and Diseases of the Cat (1856)
- The voice of thanksgiving: a selection of passages, in prose and verse, from various Christian authors (1861)
- Thoughts upon cruelty. For the Liverpool branch of the Royal Society for the Prevention of Cruelty to Animals. (1863)
- The Cat: Its History and Diseases, with Methods of Administering Medicine (1870)
- The Cat: Its History, Diseases and Management
- Drawings and paintings of flowers, fruit, fish and marine invertebrates: Three volumes comprising 205 drawings and paintings (1839 and 1866–1874)
