= Radbroke Hall =

Grade II listed English country house in the United Kingdom

Coordinates: 53.27105°N 2.34961°W

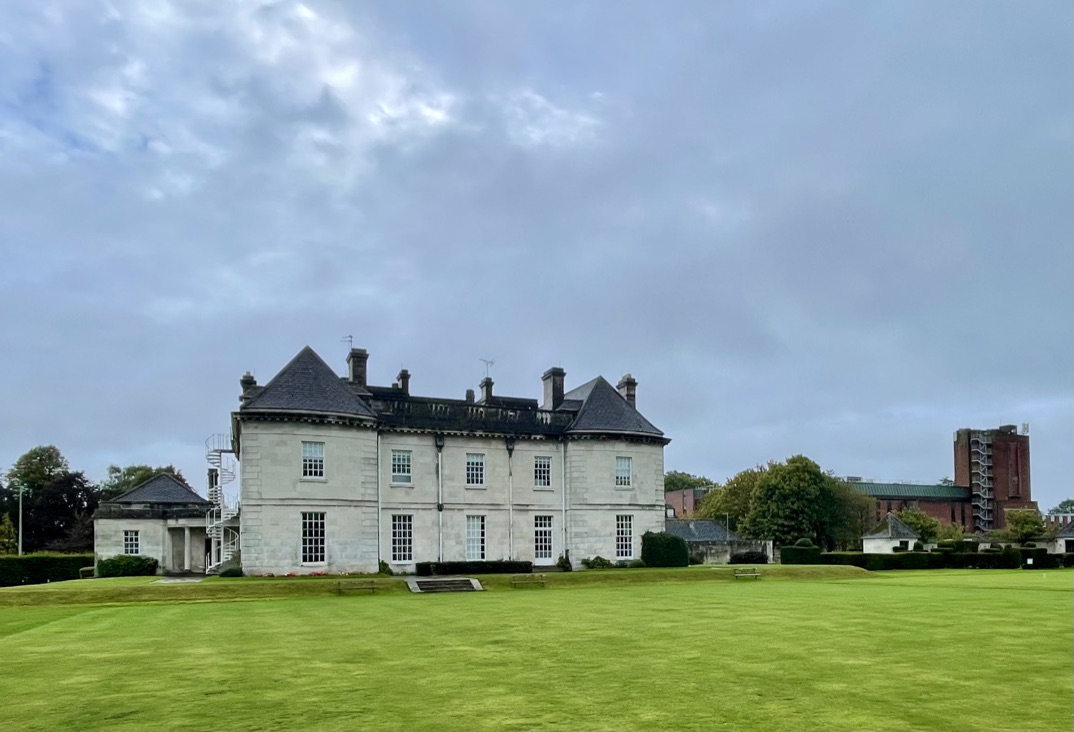
View of Radbroke Hall from the rear.

Radbroke Hall is a white French chateau-style former country house in Peover Superior, Cheshire, England. It takes its name from the Red Brook stream that runs through the grounds.

== History ==
Radbroke Hall was built between 1914 and 1917 for Manchester businessman Claude Hardy and his wife Olga. The architect was Percy Worthington. Originally from Belfast, Claude Hardy had a successful textile manufacturing business in Manchester. Unfortunately, Claude's death in 1916 left his widow to oversee the completion of the building work alone.

The hall is built of Portland stone which was brought by train to a local railway station from Weymouth. Main features of the hall include a white marble staircase, a music room, and an oval dining room. Around the hall were some twenty acres of grounds including attractive rose gardens and areas given over to a large variety of Rhododendrons. The main hall driveway is flanked by large old beech trees.

The house and parts of the gardens are recorded in the National Heritage List for England as designated Grade II listed buildings.

== The Nuclear Power Group ==
With Radbroke Hall being left mainly unoccupied during the 1920s and 1930s, it was sold by the Hardy Family in 1956 to the Nuclear Power Group who built offices and a testing tower on the grounds.

== Barclays ==
The site was purchased by Barclays from The Nuclear Power Group in 1972. Approximately 1,400 staff were relocated from London or hired locally to the new site. Today the site is a UK hub for 6,500 staff working in technology and operations teams.

== See also ==
- Listed buildings in Peover Superior
