= Mainwaring baronets of Over-Peover (first creation, 1660) =

Escutcheon of the baronets Mainwaring of Over Peover

The Mainwaring baronetcy of Over-Peover, Cheshire, was created on 22 November 1660 by Charles II on his restoration, for Thomas Mainwaring, High Sheriff of Cheshire in 1657 and Knight of the Shire otherwise Member of Parliament for Cheshire in 1660. The baronetcy was extinct on the death of the 4th Baronet.

== Mainwaring baronets of Over-Peover (1660) ==
- Sir Thomas Mainwaring, 1st Baronet (1623–1689) Member of Parliament for Cheshire 1660
- Sir John Mainwaring, 2nd Baronet (1656–1702). Member of Parliament for Cheshire 1689–1702.
- Sir Thomas Mainwaring, 3rd Baronet (1681–1726)
- Sir Henry Mainwaring, 4th Baronet (1726–1797). The title became extinct on his death.
