= St Lawrence's Church, Over Peover =

Coordinates: 53.2582°N 2.3431°W

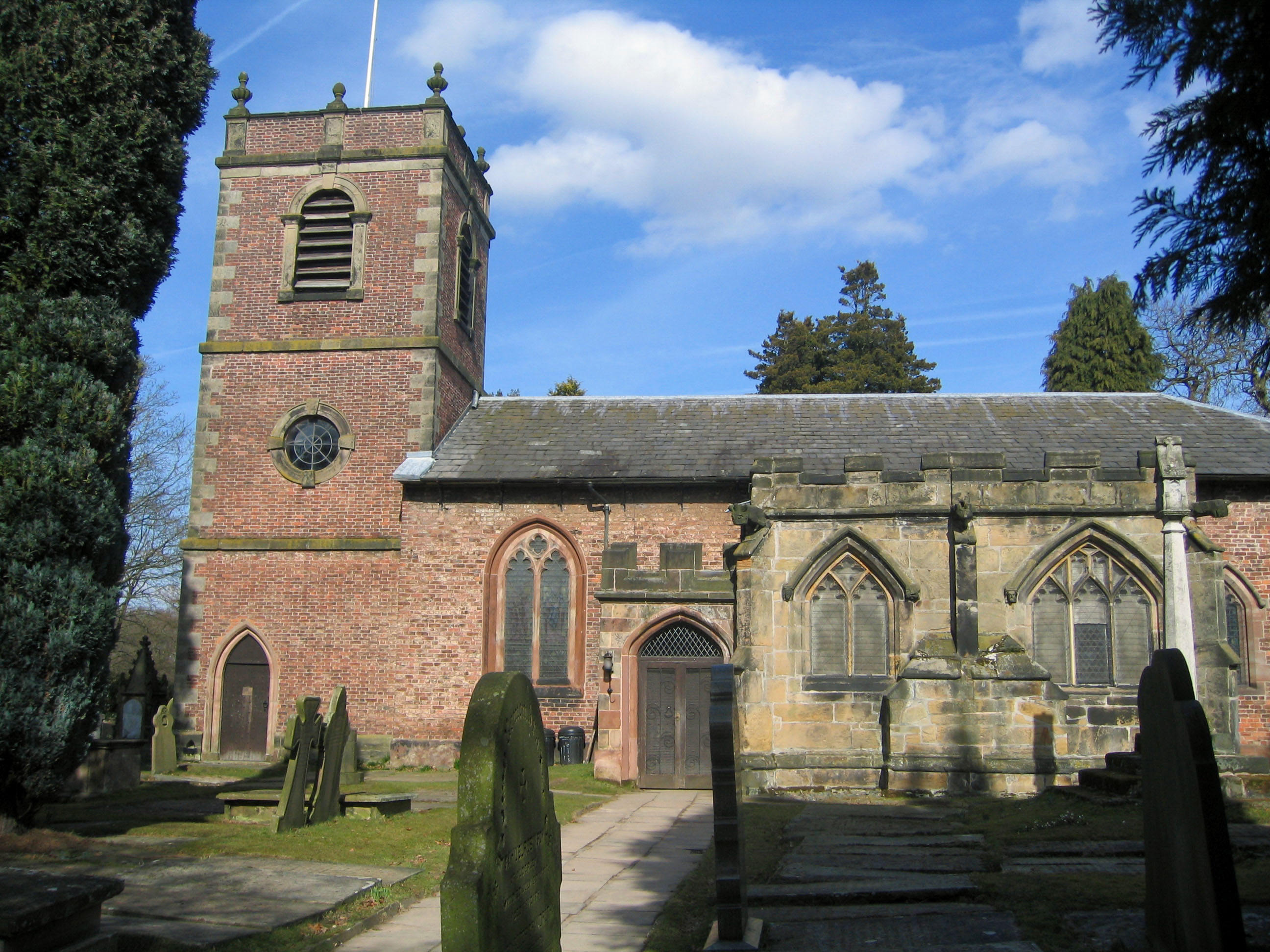
- St Lawrence's Church, Over Peover, from the south

- Location in Cheshire
- OS grid reference: SJ 772 736
- Location: Over Peover, Cheshire
- Country: England
- Denomination: Anglican
- Website: St Lawrence, Over Peover

History
- Status: Parish church
- Dedication: St Lawrence

Architecture
- Functional status: Active
- Heritage designation: Grade I
- Designated: 5 March 1959
- Architect(s): J. Garlive, William Turner
- Architectural type: Church
- Style: Gothic, Neoclassical, Gothic Revival
- Completed: 1811

Specifications
- Materials: Brick tower and body Stone chapels with leaded roofs

Administration
- Division: Peover Benefice
- Province: York
- Diocese: Chester
- Archdeaconry: Macclesfield
- Deanery: Knutsford
- Parish: Over Peover

Clergy
- Priest: Revd Fr Murray Aldridge-Collins

St Lawrence's Church, Over Peover is in the civil parish of Peover Superior. Close to Peover Hall and farm. It lies some 3 miles (5 km) south of the town of Knutsford. The church is recorded in the National Heritage List for England as a designated Grade I listed building. The church is an active Anglican parish church in the diocese of Chester, the archdeaconry of Macclesfield and the deanery of Knutsford. Its benefice is combined with that of St Oswald, Lower or Nether Peover. It is noted for its old chapels and for the monuments to the Mainwaring family.

== History ==
It is thought that the original church was built in the reign of Edward III. The present tower was built of brick in 1739, probably by J. Garlive. The nave and chancel were rebuilt in brick in 1811 by William Turner. During the restoration the pre-existing stone chapels were preserved. The south chapel dates from 1456 and the north chapel from 1648. The north chapel was built by Ellen, widow of Philip Mainwaring. The church was refurbished in 1895 by the Lancaster architects, Austin and Paley. During the Second World War, General George Patton and his staff worshipped in the church while they were stationed in Peover Hall.

== Architecture ==
=== Exterior ===
The plan consists of a west tower, a four-bay undivided nave and chancel, south and north chapels, a south porch and a north vestry. The tower is in three stages. It has round windows and arched bell-windows with pilasters. The south chapel has two bays with three buttresses surmounted by gargoyles and a battlemented parapet. The north chapel is one of the earliest regular classical buildings in the region.

=== Interior ===
The south chapel is approached through a porch and contains a canopied tomb with the effigies of Randle Mainwaring in a complete suit of plate armour, his feet resting on a lion and his head on the family crest, and his wife Margery in a long robe and an ornate head-dress. The Franciscan altar cross, brass candlesticks and hanging lamps are from Florence. The north chapel contains the marble effigies of Philip Mainwaring in plate armour, his feet resting on a lion and his head on the family crest, and Ellen with a bear at her feet. In this chapel are monuments to other members of the Mainwaring family. The ceiling contains a carved coat of arms in its centre. The north chapel screen is by F. W. Crossley. In both chapels are fragments of medieval stained glass.

In the chancel are effigies of further members of the Mainwaring which date from the 15th century. These possibly represent John, son of Randle, and his second wife Joan. In the main body of the church is the 15th-century font which is set on a base dating from a later period. An altar dating from the 17th century has been moved to the south chapel. The pulpit is Jacobean. On the north wall of the church is a painting of The Boy Daniel by John Rogers Herbert (1810–1890). In commemoration for the use of the church in the Second World War by General Patton and his staff, an American flag has been placed in the church with an explanatory bronze plaque. The organ was built in 1898 by Jardine. There is a ring of three bells, dated around 1500, 1626 and 1669. The churchwardens' accounts commence in 1674.

== External features ==
In the churchyard is an old cross base bearing a more modern cross. The cross base dates from the 15th century and consists of three steps rising to square plinth carrying an octagonal shaft base. The cross is dated 1907 and consists of an octagonal shaft topped by a gabled canopy over a cross and two figures of saints. It is listed at Grade II, and is a scheduled monument. Also in the churchyard is a sundial which was constructed in the 19th century using part of the shaft of the original 15th-century cross. The shaft stands on two square steps. It is also listed at Grade II. In addition the churchyard contains the war graves of three soldiers of World War I, and an airman of World War II.

== See also ==
- Grade I listed buildings in Cheshire East
- Grade I listed churches in Cheshire
- Listed buildings in Peover Superior
