= Percy Worthington =

English architect

Sir Percy Scott Worthington (31 January 1864 – 15 July 1939) was an English architect.

He was born in Crumpsall, Manchester, the eldest son of the architect Thomas Worthington. He was educated at Clifton College, Bristol, and Corpus Christi College, Oxford, where he graduated in 1887, and he qualified as an architect in 1890. He subsequently worked as assistant to John Macvicar Anderson in London, attending the Royal Academy Schools and University College London, before returning to his father's office where he was made a partner in 1891. He continued the business after his father's death along with his much younger brother Hubert Worthington, who became a partner in 1913. Percy's son Thomas Scott Worthington later joined the partnership.

In his early years he was interested in the Arts and Crafts movement and this was reflected in the Unitarian Chapel, Liverpool, which he designed with his father. From 1904 he became more involved in the revival of classicism. He was awarded the gold medal of the Royal Institute of British Architects in 1930 and was knighted in 1935. He died at his home in Mobberley, Cheshire, in 1939.

== Projects ==
In a professional life of almost fifty years Worthington was responsible for more than a hundred projects—domestic, educational, ecclesiastical, and medical—and won many of his major commissions in competition. His work on hospitals was described by his obituarist and confrère W. G. Newton as pioneering.

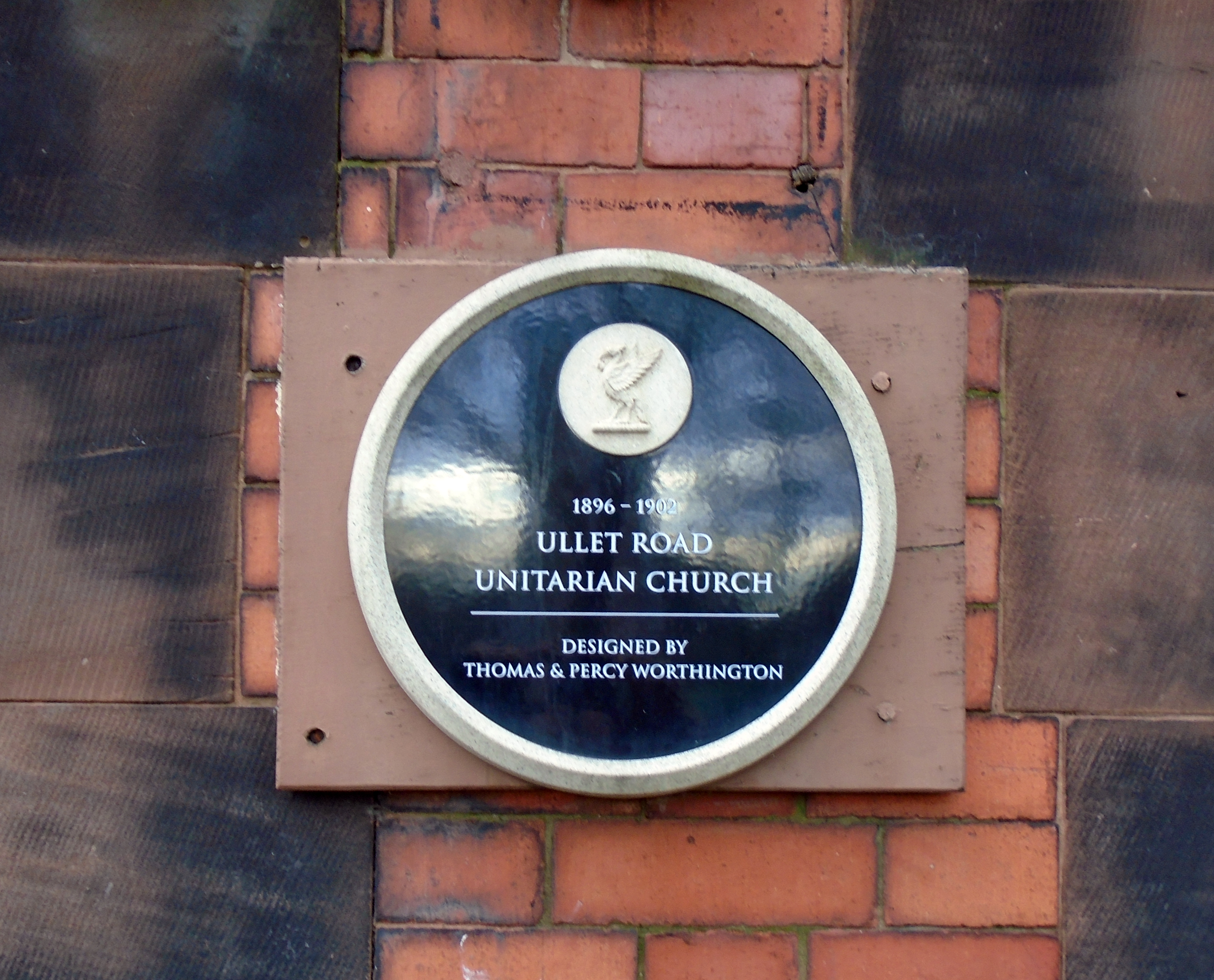
A blue plaque on a building designed by Thomas and Percy Worthington

- War Memorial Cottage Hospital, Northwich Road, Knutsford
- Kerfield House, Chelford Road, Ollerton
- Radbroke Hall, Peover Superior
- Woodgarth, Legh Road, Knutsford
- Convalescent Home, Great Warford
- War Memorial, Mobberley
- War Memorial, Whalley, Lancashire; Grade II listed
- Manchester Grammar School
- Hulme Hall, Manchester
- Ashburne Hall
- University of Manchester Library, original part.
- Parts of Harris Manchester College, Oxford, following the original part by his father.

== Citations ==
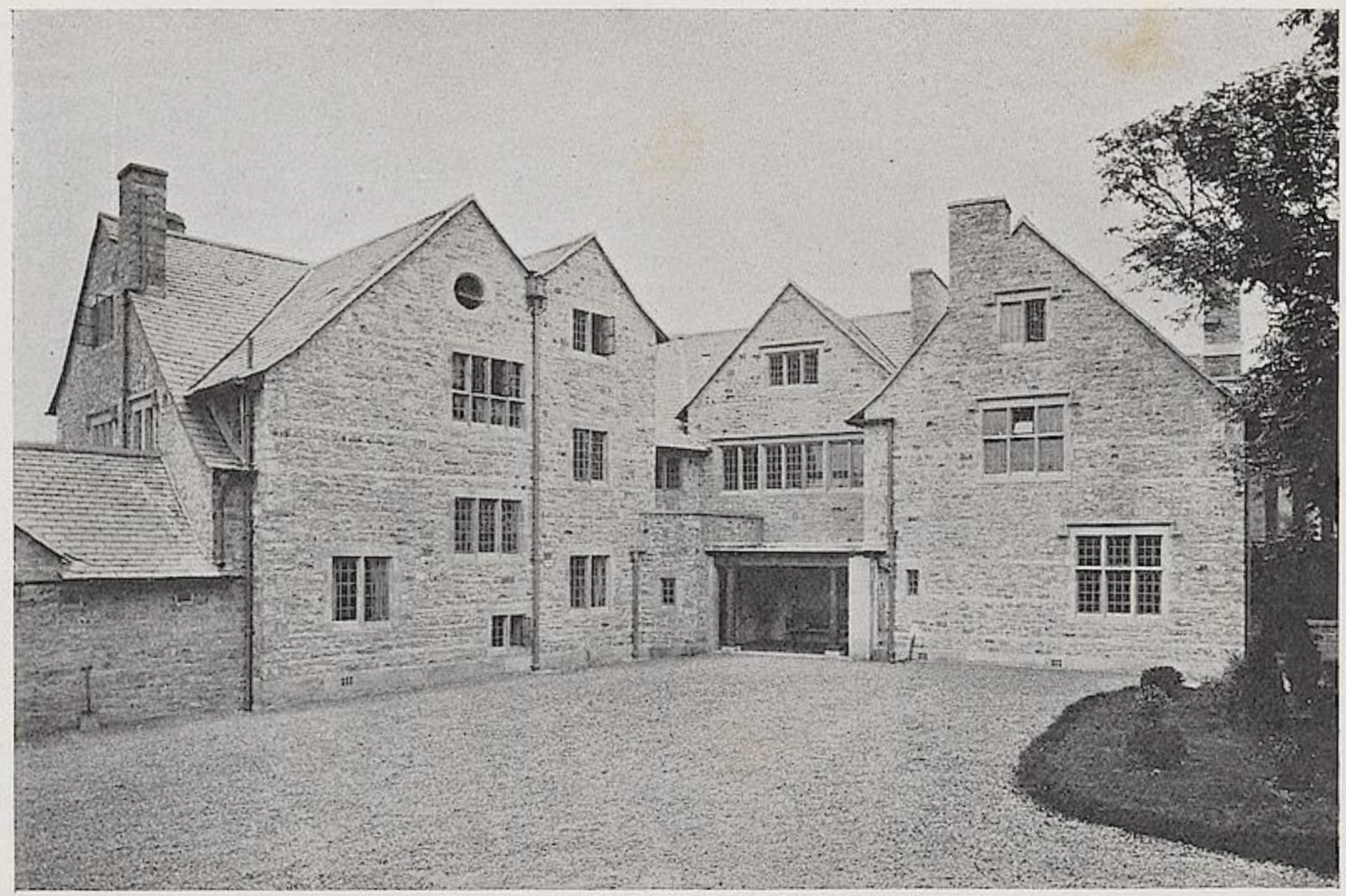
Barrows Green, near Kendal
