= Anson Engine Museum =

Museum in Poynton, Cheshire, England

Coordinates: 53.348°N 2.090°W

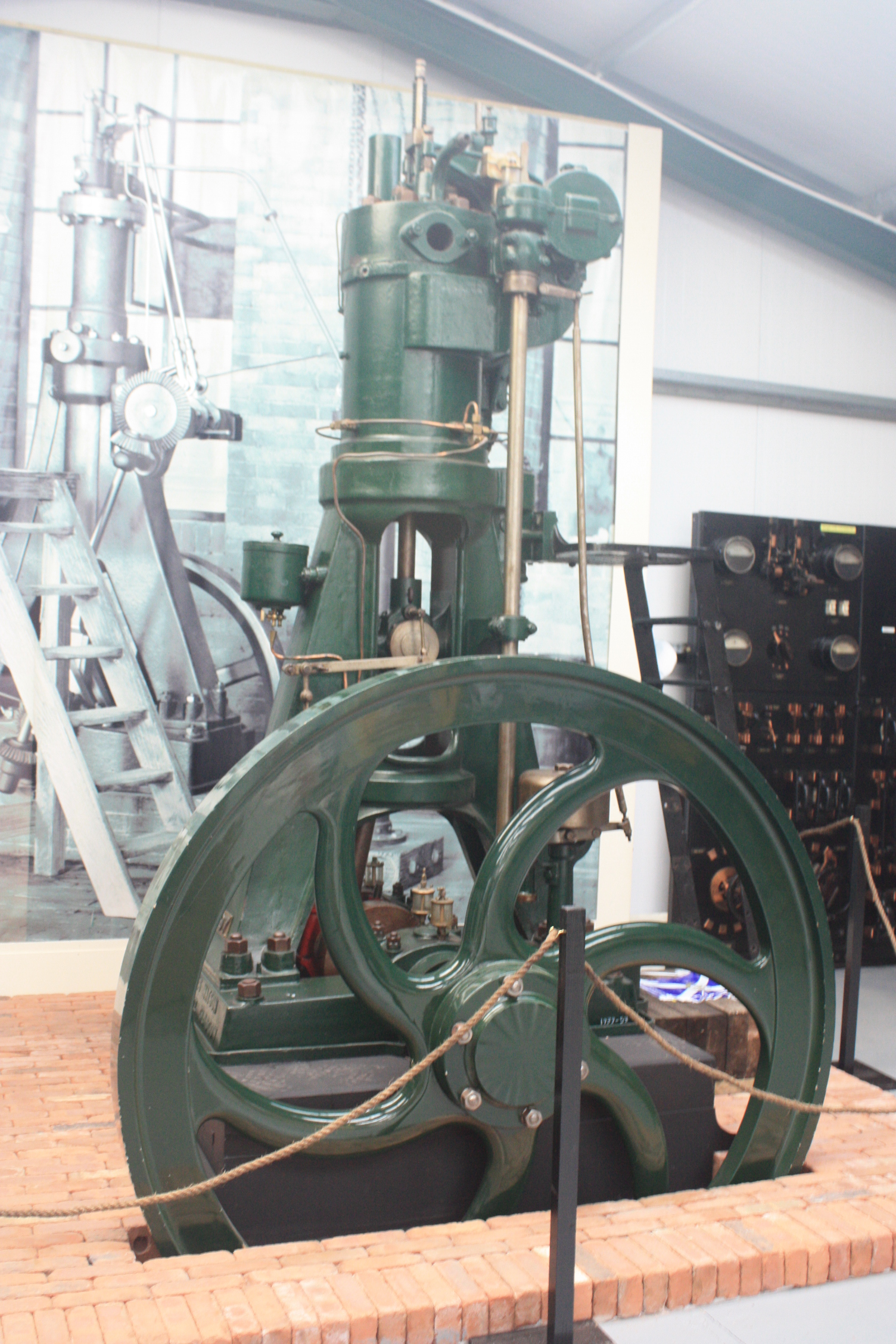
The Mirrlees No.1 on Display at the Museum

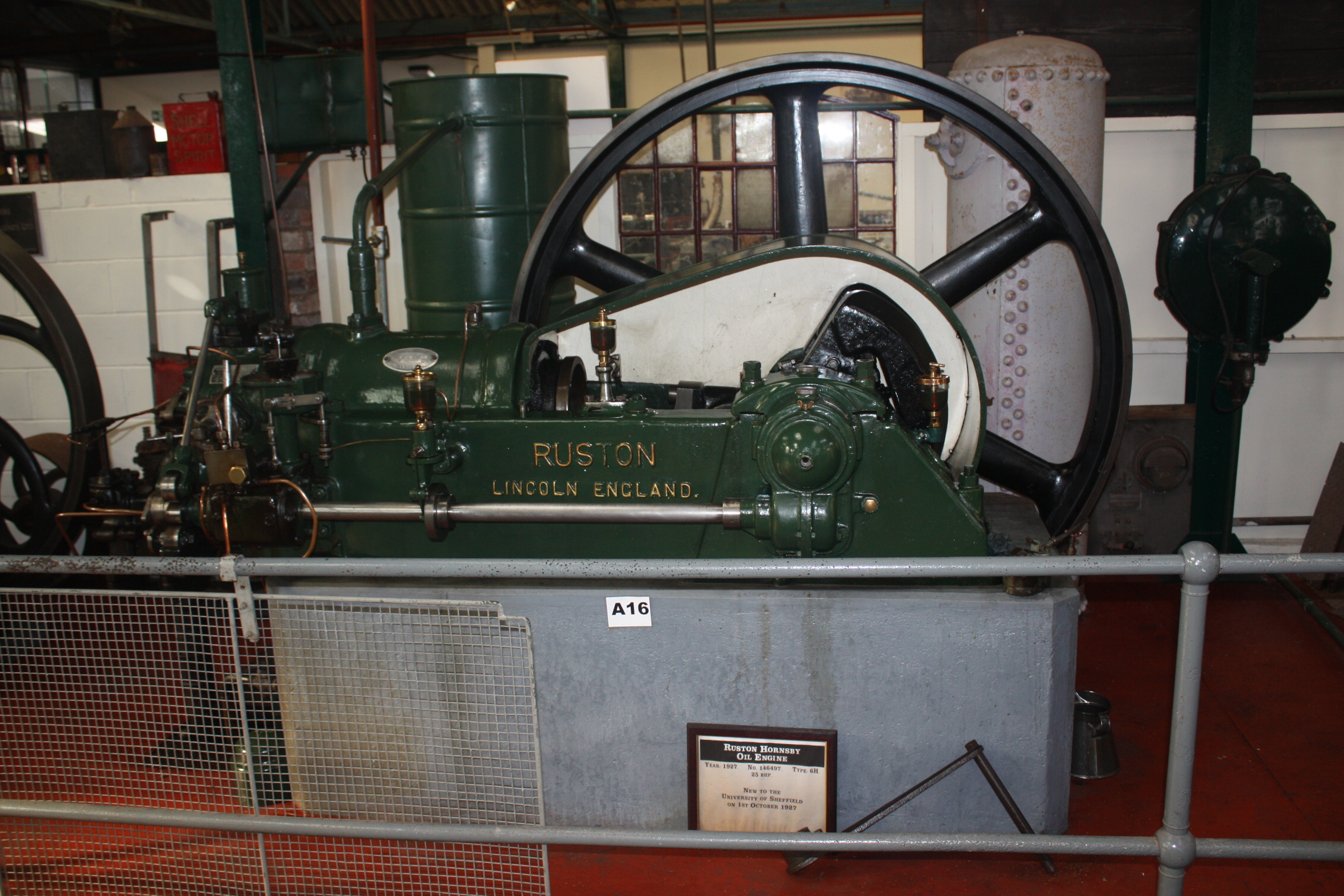
Ruston & Hornsby 25 hp horizontal engine from the University of Sheffield, a model 6H built in 1927

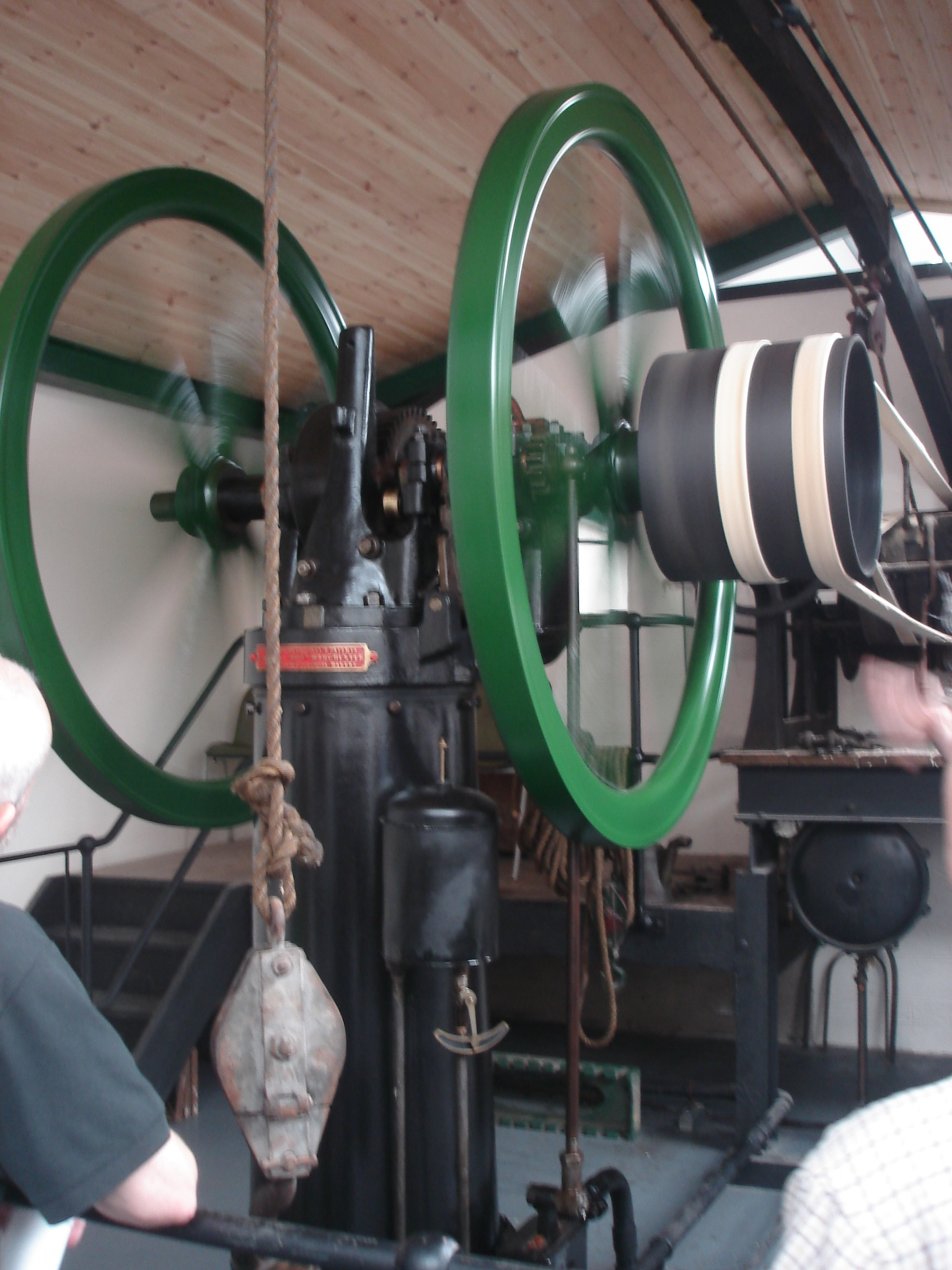
3bhp gas fired Crossley Atmospheric Engine in action operating a winch and crane jib. Acquired from W. Butler & Co, tar distillers, Bristol.

The Anson Engine Museum is situated on the site of the old Anson colliery in Poynton, Cheshire, England. It is the work of Les Cawley and Geoff Challinor who began collecting and showing stationary engines for a hobby. The museum now has one of the largest collections of engines in Europe. The museum site also includes a working blacksmith's smithy and carpentry shop and a café.

== Location ==
The Anson Engine Museum is situated on the site of the old Anson colliery in Poynton, Cheshire, England.

== History ==
=== Coal ===
Coal is found outcropping to the east of Towers Road, Poynton which corresponds to the line of the Red Rock Fault; that is at the surface. It has been worked from early times. The earliest record to be found is a lease dated 28 February 1589, which talks of the "Coal pit at Wourthe lately occupied by George Finche". This was originally worked on the surface then by shallow shafts, and later by deeper shafts with waterwheels or steam engines operating pumps and winding gear. In the later 18th century, the Warrens of Poynton co-operated with the Leghs of Lyme to work the Cannel and Sheepwash seams at Norbury Hollow. Output in 1789 was over 23,586 tonnes (26,000 tons) rising to a peak production of 221,056 tonnes (243,673 tons) in 1859. The Poynton Colleries were substantial, and the coal rights were held by the Warren family who leased them the Wrights and the Claytons. In 1826 the estate passed to George John Venables Vernon, 4th Lord Vernon who decided in 1832 to manage the mines himself. In 1856 it was estimated that there was a reserve of 15,163,027 tons which would supply 245,000 tons for 61 years. This was to be supplied by the Park Round Pit, (Note: Please note that in Cheshire and Lancashire, mine was a word meaning seam, a pit was a shaft and a collection of shafts was a colliery.) and the Park Oval Pit both working the Four Foot and Five Foot Seam and the Anson Pit and the Nelson Pit which were working the Accommodation Seam. The closure of the Norbury Pits resulted in a constant ingress of water. In 1926 production was down to 80,146 tons. The collieries closed on 30 August 1935; 250 men were made redundant.

==== Anson Pit ====
Hig Meadow Pit was operating in 1826. It is reported to have had a Newcomen atmospheric engine with an 18-inch bore that was used for winding. There were 1088 yards of rail track beneath the surface and 22 coal tubs. In 1847 the pit was known as Anson or Lower Anson. It employed 36 men and six boys and worked the Gees Seam at a depth of 132 yards. It now had a 16 HP engine. In 1853 they descended to the Accommodation Seam at 191 yards, and also worked the Reform Seam at 147 yards. In 1856, they were producing 170 tons of coal a day.

The winding engine was replaced in 1869 by one with 2 horizontal cylinders 25in bore and 60in stroke. They had double beat valves. The rope drum was 14 ft in diameter. This engine was still working in 1926 when the pit closed. A further engine was installed to haul tubs up a 900yard, 1 in 7 incline in the Accommodation seam. It had two horizontal cylinders 15in by 30in geared to a five-foot winding drum. Both were fed steam at 30 psi by three Lancashire Boilers.

Ventilation was provided by a furnace at Horse Pasture Pit, and also by other ventilation furnaces at Walker Pit, Venture Pit and Higher Canal Pit.

The Anson Colliery is now the site of the Anson Engine Museum, all other shafts have been capped and Park Pit has been levelled.

=== Museum ===
The museum is the result of years of work by Les Cawley and Geoff Challinor who began collecting and showing stationary engines for a hobby. When the number and size of engines they collected increased, they decided to start the museum. A charitable trust was formed and work began on the first building in 1986. The museum first opened to the public in 1989. For many years it opened only on odd days and times to suit their hobby and the small number of visitors that dropped in to see the collection. In July 2002 Les Cawley died and Geoff Challinor dedicated himself to making the museum into an attraction that would bring visitors from around the world.

== Exhibits ==
=== Crossley, Mirrlees and Gardner engines ===
Among the earliest engines are the original number 1 engines built by Crossley and Mirrlees. Manchester became predominant in the development and manufacture of stationary engines, and by the 1900s, there were over 20 engine makers in existence within 20 miles of the museum.

Mirrlees, Bickerton & Day, in Hazel Grove, concentrated on developing the light and heavy oil diesel engine and L Gardner & Sons of Patricroft become known the world over for their role in bringing the small high-speed, quality diesel engines to the industrial and marine markets and Crossley Brothers in Openshaw took up Nicolaus Otto and Langen patents. Local manufacturers are the prime focus of the museum exhibits.

=== Top attractions ===
Today the museum has one of the largest collection of engines in Europe and attracts stationary engine enthusiasts from around the globe. Over the past few years it has picked up awards for its displays, volunteers and for some of the engines.

Among the top attraction engines are:-

- Largest running example of Crossley Atmospheric gas engine;
- Award Winning, original L Gardner & Sons L series engine along with Engineering Heritage Hallmark Scheme (EHHS) plaque from Institution of Mechanical Engineers;
- Oldest diesel engine in the UK - Mirrlees No1;
- Original Crossley No1 engine;
- Steam engine area with a Stott cross-compound mill engine and a Fowler beam engine;
- Very rare Griffin 6-stroke engine;
- Rare Atkinson cycle engine;
- Crossley over-hung crank;
- Hugon gas engine;
- 63 ton Ruston & Hornsby used at Ealing Studios.

== See also ==
- Internal Fire - Museum of Power
- Prickwillow Museum - collection of large diesel pumping engines
- List of museums in Cheshire
