= Mainwaring baronets =

Set index for Mainwaring baronets

The Baronetcy of Mainwaring of Over-Peover has twice been created for members of the family of Mainwaring of Over-Peover, Cheshire.

- Mainwaring baronets of Over-Peover (first creation, 1660)
- Mainwaring baronets of Over-Peover (second creation, 1804)
