= Thomas Mainwaring =

Member of the Parliament of England

Sir Thomas Mainwaring, 1st Baronet (7 April 1623 – 28 June 1689) was an English politician who sat in the House of Commons in 1660.

Mainwaring was the son of Philip Mainwaring of Peover Hall, Over Peover and his wife Ellen Minshull, daughter of Edward Minshull of Stoke. In 1654 his mother had the Peover Hall Stable Block built for him. He was High Sheriff of Cheshire in 1657.

In 1660, Mainwaring was elected Member of Parliament for Cheshire in the Convention Parliament. He was created baronet on 22 November 1660 by Charles II on his restoration.

Mainwaring died at the age of 66 and buried in Over Peover. He had married Mary Delves, daughter of Sir Henry Delves, 2nd Baronet, of Dodington and had 6 sons and 6 daughters. His only surviving son, John, succeeded to the baronetcy and was also an MP.

Parliament of England
| Preceded by Richard Legh; John Bradshaw | Member of Parliament for Cheshire; 1660–1661; With: Sir George Booth, Bt | Succeeded by Peter Venables; The Lord Brereton |
Baronetage of England
| New creation | Baronet (of Over-Peover); 1660–1689 | Succeeded by John Mainwaring |
