= Knutsford War Memorial Cottage Hospital =

Geography
- Location: Knutsford, Cheshire, England
- Coordinates: 53°18′09″N 02°22′15″W (Knutsford)

Organisation
- Type: Cottage hospital

History
- Opened: 1922

Links
- Lists: Hospitals in England

Knutsford War Memorial Cottage Hospital is a former hospital in Knutsford, Cheshire. It was designed by architect Sir Percy Worthington and opened in 1922.

== History ==
The idea of establishing a cottage hospital as the war memorial for Knutsford was discussed by Knutsford Urban District Council, which met to consider the issue of commemoration of those local men who had fallen in The Great War. When in 1919 councillors visited similar hospitals in Nantwich and Urmston, they found the "architectural features and internal arrangements of the Nantwich Cottage Hospital superior". Chairman of the council, J. Cox stated "such a memorial would be a credit to Knutsford and at the same time they would be doing justice by the lads who had fallen in the fight".

Councillors also realised that such a building, was something which the Knutsford's whole Town Meeting must decide upon. It was also realised that since a War Memorial in the form of a Cottage hospital would need a considerable sum of money for its building and endowment, (£30,000) the Parishes around the town should be encouraged to join in this endeavour. Those residents having made their decision, the building and endowment was made possible by the following Parishes: Knutsford, Mobberley, Pickmere, Mere, Tatton, Toft, Bexton, High Legh, Tabley Superior, Tabley Inferior, Marthall, Ollerton, Over Peover, Lower Peover, Allostock, Nether Peover, Peover Inferior and Plumley.

Funds were raised by local subscription, with a building cost of £6,274.8s.7d. Land was provided by Major Leicester-Warren of Tabley. The hospital opened on 2 August 1922. In 1948 the hospital was transferred to the newly formed National Health Service. In 1996 the hospital was sold to the British Red Cross.

In February 2016, the hospital and grounds were put up for sale by the Red Cross.

In 2017, the proposed new owner of the hospital, McCarthy & Stone stated it would not complete the purchase until it received planning permission for the demolition of the hospital and construction of a retirement apartment complex.
