= L. Gardner and Sons =

British engine manufacturer

L. Gardner and Sons Limited
- Company type: Limited company
- Industry: Mechanical engineering
- Founded: 1868; 158 years ago in Hulme, England
- Founder: Lawrence Gardner
- Fate: Taken over
- Successor: Hawker Siddley (1977); Perkins Engines (1986)
- Headquarters: Patricroft, Manchester, England
- Products: Marine, stationary and automotive diesel engines

L. Gardner and Sons Limited was a British builder of diesel engines for stationary, marine, road and rail applications. The company was founded in Hulme, Manchester, England in 1868. It started building engines around 1895. The firm ceased engine production in the mid-1990s.

== Origin ==
About 1868 Lawrence Gardner set up as a sewing machine maker in Upper Duke Street, Stretford Road, Hulme, Manchester. He died in 1890, but the business was continued by his sons under the name L. Gardner & Sons Limited.

== Gas and diesel engines ==
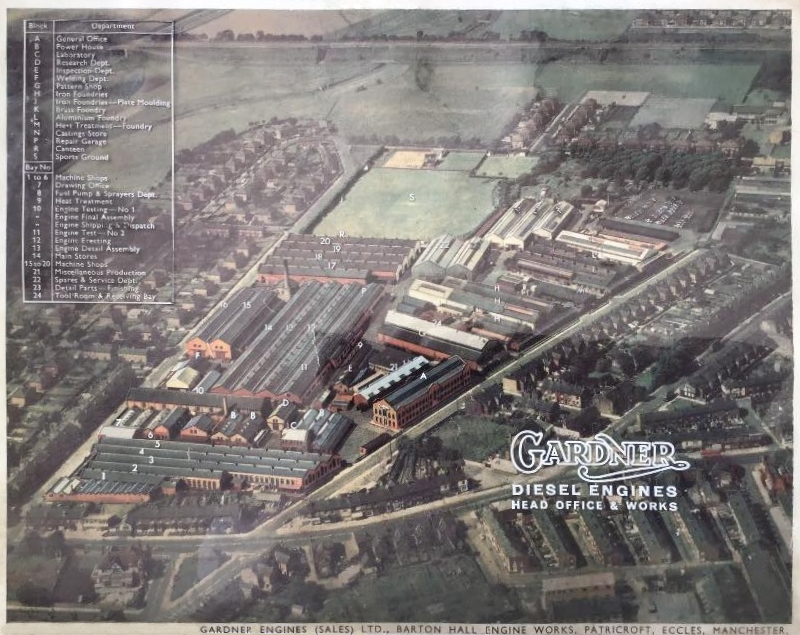
Barton Hall Engine Works, Manchester

From about 1895 the company was building gas engines and, in 1899 it moved into Barton Hall Engine Works, Patricroft, Manchester.

In 1903 it became a limited company, L Gardner and Sons Limited. Norris and Henty Ltd. of London, were appointed as sales agents. Diesel engine production began in around 1903. In 1912 a new sales subsidiary, Norris, Henty and Gardners Ltd., was formed.

During World War I (1914–1918) the company made munitions and parts for heavy guns; and (under licence) Ricardo 150 hp petrol engines for Mark V tanks. (Note: Gardners was one of nine companies which received orders to produce a total of 5,342 Ricardo engines for the Mark V tank: Tangyes Bros. Ltd., Birmingham; Browett, Lindley & Co; National Gas Engine, Ltd; - founded by the Bickerton Brothers - Henry Neild Bickerton co-formed Mirrlees, Bickerton and Day; British Westinghouse; Willans & Robinson; Crossley Motors; Peter Brotherhood Ltd; Perkins Ltd; L. Gardner and Sons; and Ruston & Hornsby.)

== Automotive engines ==
During the 1920s there was rapid development in the design of diesel engines. In 1929 a Gardner 4L2 marine engine was fitted into a Lancia bus. This conversion was successful and prompted Gardner to introduce the LW series of diesel engines, designed especially for road vehicles but later modified and supplied as a marine engine with factory-fitted bilge pumps. The LW engine was a modular design, with separate cast iron cylinder blocks and cylinder heads comprising either 2 or 3 cylinders. A 5-cylinder engine would thus use a "2" and a "3", whereas a 6-cylinder engine could have either 3 "2"s or 2 "3"s. Boat engines had a cast iron crankcase, whereas (in the interest of lightness) road vehicles would have an aluminium alloy crankcase. Any boat engine with an alloy crankcase would be a marinised road engine.

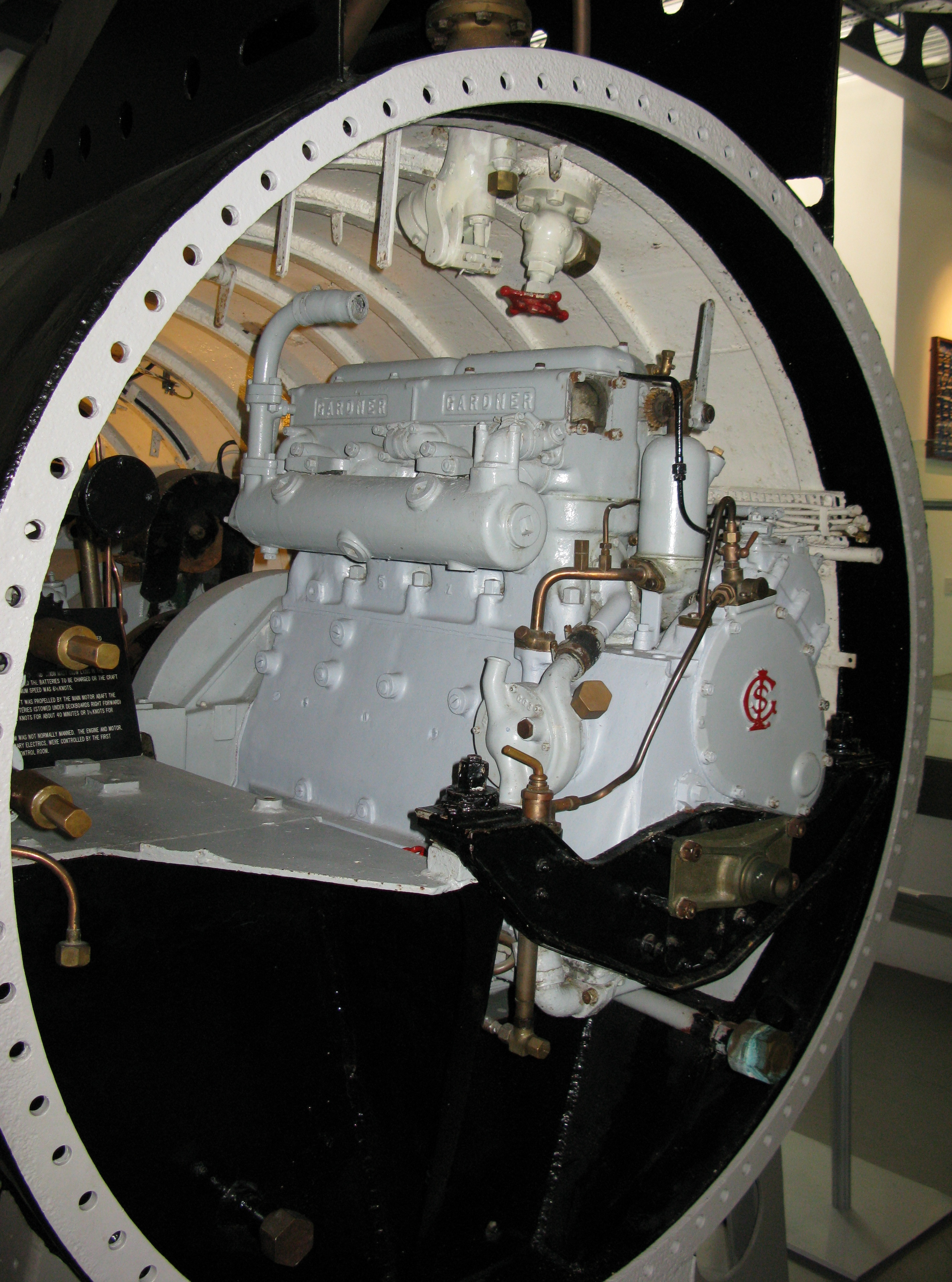
The Gardner engine of X24

During the 1930s a number of LW-series engines (usually 4LWs, but occasionally 6LWs) were installed in large luxury cars including Lagondas, Bentleys and Rolls-Royces. The Gardner engine's reliability and economy (tests showed that even a two-ton Bentley could achieve 30 miles per gallon of fuel while having a top speed of 80 mph), coupled to its remarkable refinement and smooth running abilities, made it the only suitable compression-ignition engine at the time.

During World War II (1939–1945) Gardner's war work consisted mainly of building diesel engines of their own design. Their 4LK bus engines were also used as the main powerplant in the Royal Navy's X class and XE class midget submarines.

== Post-war diesels ==
After the war the LW diesel engine continued to be built in large numbers for lorries and buses and was later supplemented by the more modern LX. In the mid-1960s, the LW range was upgraded to develop 20 bhp per cylinder, and known as LW20. The 6LX was upgraded in 1967 from 150 bhp @1700rpm to 180 bhp @1850rpm. An 8-cylinder version was developed which developed 240 bhp @ 1850rpm, and was said to be the smoothest running automotive diesel ever built. The larger 6L3 and 8L3 engines were used in railway locomotives, such as British Rail Class 01 and 04 and also in vessels of up to 120 feet such as MV Havengore, and maxi yachts Condor and Condor of Bermuda.

== Takeover and decline ==
In June 1976, Rolls-Royce acquired a 17% shareholding, but, in December 1977, the business was purchased by Hawker Siddeley.

In the summer of 1986, after months of denials, Perkins Engines purchased Gardner to complement their line of lighter diesel engines. Production then ceased until October, because Gardner's truck engine market share had slumped precariously, although Gardner's market for buses and coaches was doing better.

L. Gardner and Sons ceased production of new engines in the early 1990s. The introduction of emissions regulations for road-going Gardner diesels would have required the development of significantly modified, or totally new, engine designs, and in the marine market there was a shift away from big, low-speed, high-torque engines such as Gardners, towards adapted high-speed automotive turbodiesels.

== Gardner automotive engines list ==
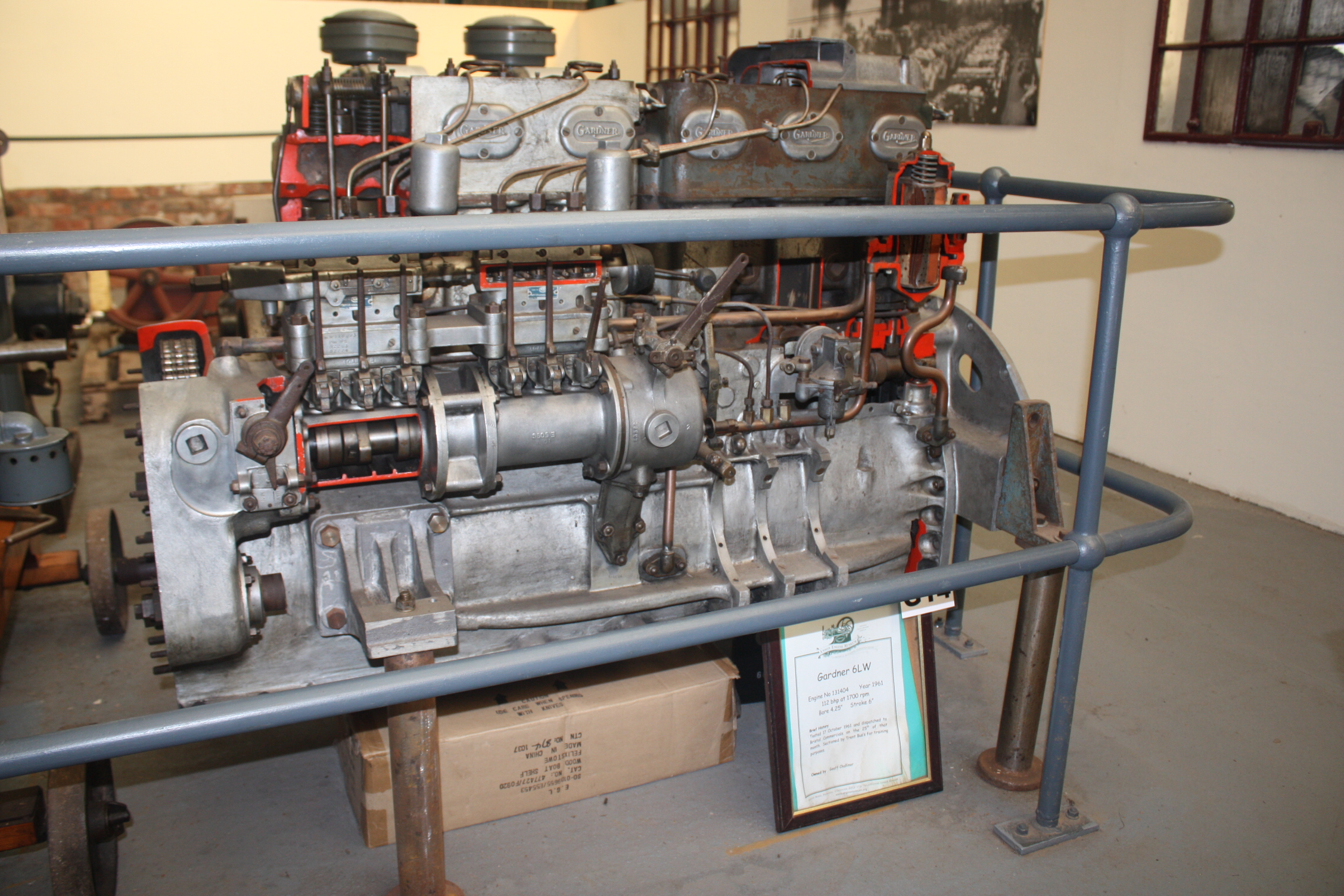
A Sectioned 6LW of 1961 at the Anson Engine Museum from a Bristol Commercial Vehicles bus.

These were often fitted as marine equipment (or retro fitted) but initially designed as automotive use. The alloy crankcase is the clue to the original design intentions from Gardner. Any engine with a cast iron crankcase is marine or stationary use.

Common power units, not all are listed:

- Gardner 4LK, 60 hp @ 2100 RPM, Natural 4-cylinder diesel, Cylinder capacity: 3,800 cc
- Gardner 4LW, 75 hp @ 1700 RPM, Natural 4-cylinder diesel, Cylinder capacity: 5,580 cc
- Gardner 5LW, 85 hp (later 94 hp known as Gardner-100) @ 1700 RPM, Natural 5-cylinder diesel, Cylinder capacity: 6,975 cc
- Gardner 6LW 102 hp (later 112 hp known as Gardner-120) @ 1700 RPM, 350 lbft @ 1,000 RPM, Natural 6-cylinder diesel, Cylinder capacity: 8,370 cc
- Gardner 6LX, 150 hp @ 1700 RPM, Natural 6-cylinder diesel, Cylinder capacity: 10,450 cc
- Gardner 6LXB, 180 hp @ 1850 RPM (Gross 188 bhp), 562 lbft @ 1000 RPM, Natural 6-cylinder diesel, Cylinder capacity: 10,450 cc [note, some 6LXB units were detuned for 150 bhp, mainly buses and the ERF M series]
- Gardner 6LXC, 201 hp @ 1920 RPM (Installed 195.4 bhp), 578 lbft @ 1000 RPM, Natural 6-cylinder diesel, Cylinder capacity: 10,450 cc
- Gardner 8LXB, 240 hp @ 1850 RPM (Gross 244.8 bhp), 728 lbft @ 1000 RPM, Natural 8-cylinder diesel, Cylinder capacity: 13,933 cc
- Gardner 8LXC, 265 hp @ 1920 RPM (Installed 258.5 bhp), 754 lbft @ 1000 RPM, Natural 8-cylinder diesel, Cylinder capacity: 13,933 cc
- Gardner 6LXCT, 230 hp @ 1900 RPM (Installed 223.5 bhp), 673 lbft @ 1400 RPM, Turbo 6-cylinder diesel, Cylinder capacity: 10,450 cc
- Gardner 6LXDT, 270 hp @ 1800 RPM (Installed 269bhp), 830 lbft @ 1000 RPM, Turbo 6-cylinder diesel, Cylinder capacity: 12,700 cc
- Gardner 6LYT 320 hp @ 1800 RPM, 1031 lbft @ 1000 RPM, Turbo 6-cylinder diesel, Cylinder capacity: 15,500 cc

When Hugh Gardner designed the last natural aspiration engines in the late 1970s (the LXC being the last natural induction before turbocharging of the LXCT) the advertised power was taken at Gross power (Gross power being less any auxiliaries) as opposed to Installed. With the earlier LX'B' engine the engine's power was often downplayed to Installed power. I.E a Gardner-180 was a 188 gross BHP engine, advertised as 180 BHP. This was opposite to how a lot of other manufacturers advertised their products, and how Gardner themselves had previously stated power ratings of the pre LX series engines. For automotive use, power was important to suit the minimum HP requirements to weight ratio. The LXC's power was advertised as gross, with an Installed power being less. Hence a 265 LXC was actually Installed at 258.5 BHP as example.

== Preservation ==
The Anson Engine Museum has an extensive collection of historic Gardner engines. An engine is on display at Science and Industry Museum Manchester
