= Englesea Brook Chapel and Museum =

Chapel in Cheshire, England

Coordinates: 53.05987°N 2.37142°W

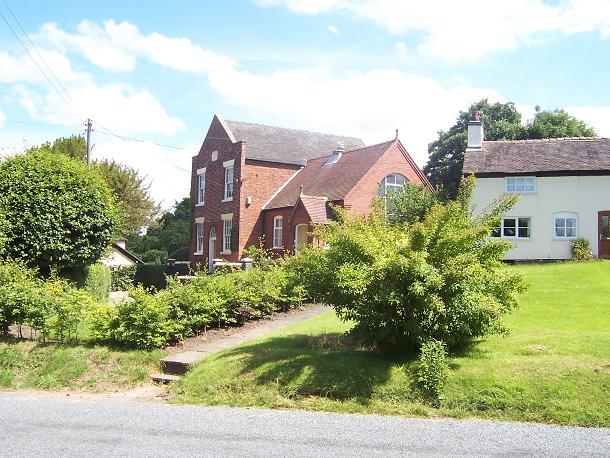
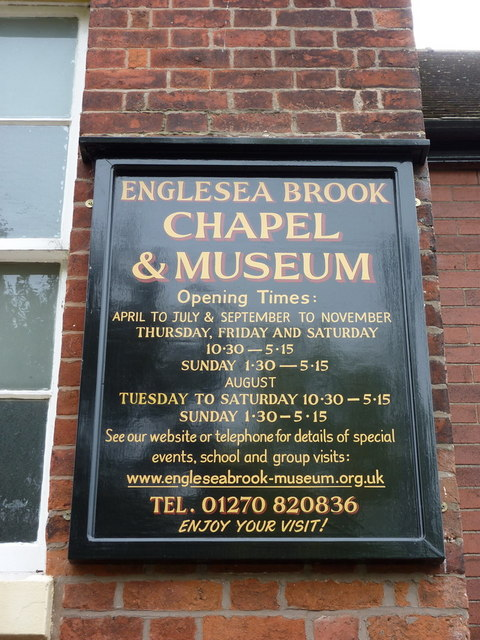
Front of Englesea Brook Chapel and Museum

Englesea Brook Chapel and Museum is in the village of Englesea-Brook, Cheshire, England. Built in 1828, the chapel was one of the earliest chapels of the Primitive Methodist movement, and the Sunday school was added in 1914. Since 1986 it has been a museum of Primitive Methodism. The building is recorded in the National Heritage List for England as a designated Grade II listed building. In the chapel is a historic pipe organ. The museum contains artefacts relating to the movement, and arranges a changing programme of exhibitions and other events. In the graveyard near the museum is a monument to Hugh Bourne, founder of the movement.

== History ==
The chapel was built in 1828, and is reputed to be the earliest surviving purpose-built chapel for Primitive Methodism. This movement started with an outdoor meeting in 1807 at Mow Cop organised by Hugh Bourne, and for the following years meetings continued to be held in the open air or in private houses. Because of their enthusiasm the participants were nicknamed "ranters". The chapel was altered in 1832, its entrance front dating from this time, when the west gallery was also installed. The Sunday school was added to the chapel in 1914. The building was restored in 1986, when it was converted into a museum of Primitive Methodism.

== Architecture ==
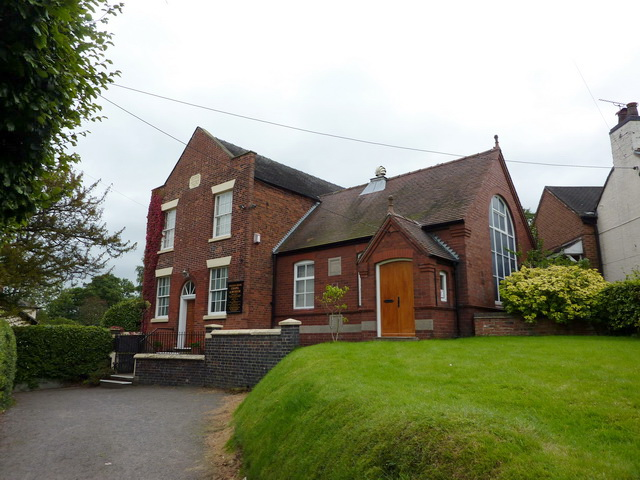
Chapel (left) and school room (right)

The former chapel and school are built in red brick with ashlar dressings. Both have datestones recording the years of their building. The chapel has a symmetrical gabled entrance front, having a central doorway with a moulded surround and a fanlight. This is flanked by a sash window on each side, with similar windows above. The windows contain 4×4 panes, and have stone sills and wedge lintels. The datestone is in the gable. Attached to the right of the chapel is the school. This is in a single storey, and has a gabled porch. The chapel is approached by a flight of stone steps, and in front of it is a wall surmounted by cast iron railings. On 29 January 1979 the chapel and school were designated as a Grade II listed building. (Note: Grade II is the lowest of the three gradings awarded by English Heritage. It is applied to "buildings of national importance and special interest".)

Inside the chapel are box pews dating from 1832, and other furnishings dating mainly from 1892 that include a pulpit and a panelled dais. Also in the church is the first organ to be used in a Primitive Methodist chapel. This was originally used in a chapel in Silsden, and was moved from there to a chapel in Bradley in 1850. The organ was later moved to a private house in Burnley, and was donated to the chapel by its owner. It was installed in the museum in 1987, and was further restored in 2007. It is a small pipe organ with a single manual and three stops, and is operated by a foot pump. In 2004 it was awarded a Grade II Historic Organ Certificate.

== Associated structures ==
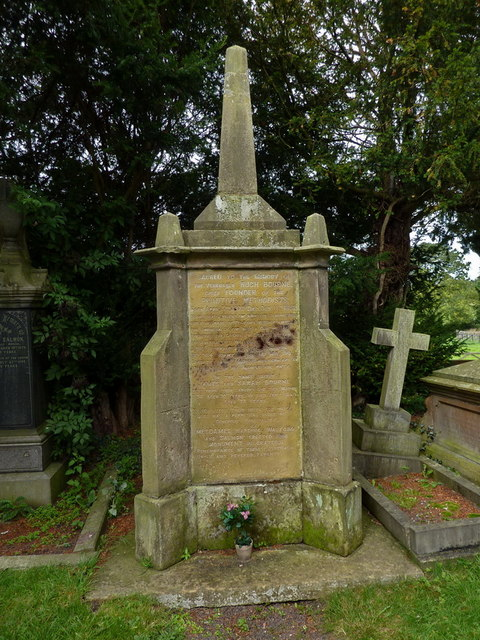
Monument to Hugh Bourne

Across the road and opposite to the chapel is its graveyard. In the graveyard is a monument to the movement's founder, Hugh Bourne, who died in 1852. The monument was designed by John Walford, and is built in ashlar, with an inscription in lead lettering. The monument consists of a square plinth, with stepped buttresses on the corners that are surmounted by small finials in the form of obelisks. Standing on the plinth is a larger obelisk, and on the plinth is an inscription recording the life and achievements of Hugh Bourne. The monument is also designated as a Grade II listed building. (Note: The inscription reads: "Sacred to the memory of The Venerable Hugh Bourne Chief Founder of the Primitive Methodists Born April 3rd 1772 Died Oct 11th 1852 He was very eminent for promoting Camp meetings and other modes of religious worship amongst commonalty for half a century. He preached the gospel in Great Britain and America then fell asleep leaving behind 9916 itinerant and local preachers 109,984 members in society 140906 Sabbath school teachers and scholars as monuments of his labours and piety".)

== Present day ==
The museum is under the care of the Methodist Heritage Committee of the Methodist Church of Great Britain and is currently open to visitors Thursdays through to Sundays April to October. A charge is made for members of groups, but not for individual visitors. Prearranged visits can be undertaken during the closed season. Several annual Christmas events are held onsite, and there are online events happening throughout the year. In the museum is a tea room and a shop, and there is a changing programme of exhibitions. The museum contains a pulpit used by Hugh Bourne and by William Clowes, a fellow founder of the movement, which was originally in a private house in Tunstall. There is also a printing press used by Bourne, and the sea chest he took with him when visiting Canada in 1844 together with a list of its contents.

== See also ==
- Listed buildings in Weston, Cheshire East
