= Museum of Policing in Cheshire =

Coordinates: 53.3861°N 2.6007°W

The Museum of Policing in Cheshire is a museum that focuses on law enforcement and its history in the county of Cheshire. It is based in Warrington Police station. The exhibits include uniforms from history, and a Doctor Who police box. A book based upon the museum archives was published in 2014.
