= Englesea-Brook =

Village in Cheshire, England

Coordinates: 53.060°N 2.372°W

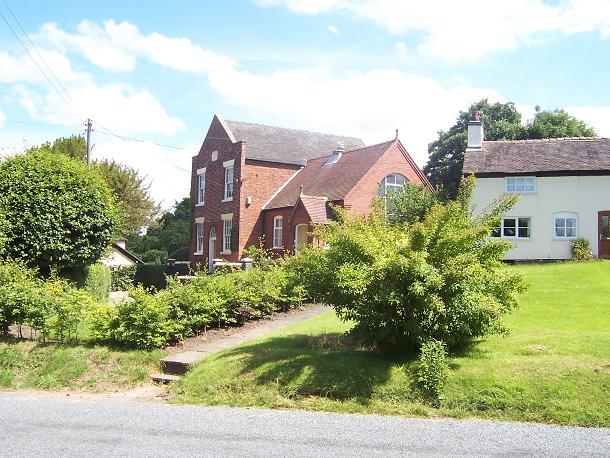
- Primitive Methodist chapel at Englesea-Brook

- Location within Cheshire
- Civil parish: Weston
- Unitary authority: Cheshire East
- Ceremonial county: Cheshire
- Region: North West
- Country: England
- Sovereign state: United Kingdom
- Police: Cheshire
- Fire: Cheshire
- Ambulance: North West

Englesea-Brook is a small rural village in the civil parish of Weston, in the unitary authority area of Cheshire East and the ceremonial county of Cheshire, England. Located close to Crewe, and to junction 16 of the M6 motorway. One of the main points of interest is Englesea Brook Chapel and Museum, one of the earliest chapels of the Primitive Methodist movement, and a museum of the working-class religious movement, Primitive Methodism.
