= Peover Hall =

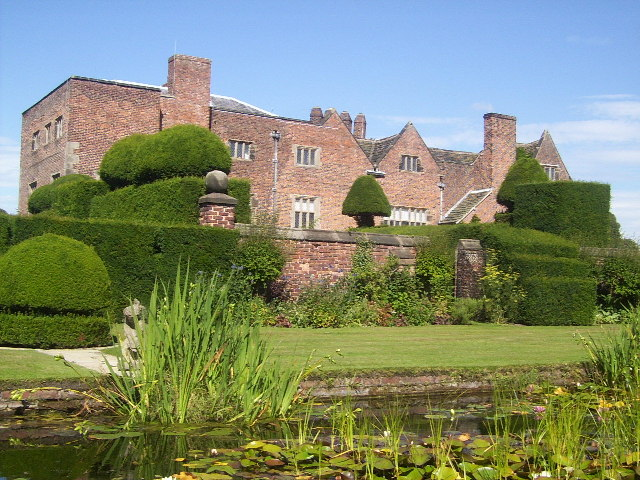
- Peover Hall

- Location in Cheshire
- 53.2581°N 2.3422°W
- Location: Peover Superior, Cheshire, England
- OS grid reference: SJ 772 735

History
- Built for: Sir Ralph Mainwaring

Listed Building – Grade II*
- Designated: 5 March 1959
- Reference no.: 1329813

Peover Hall (/ˈpiːvər/ PEE-vər) is a country house in the civil parish of Peover Superior, commonly known as Over Peover, Cheshire, England. It is recorded in the National Heritage List for England as a designated Grade II* listed building.

== History ==
The house was refaced in 1585 and was built for Sir Randall Mainwaring. There have been alterations and additions to the house in around 1653–56, around 1764, around 1944 and in 1966. It was originally planned as an H- shaped house but this plan was abandoned around 1590. In 1654 a stable block was built. The alterations in the 1760s included a wing at a right-angle to the house (added c.1764), making it a T-shape, and a new stable block and coach house. In 1919 the Mainwaring family sold the house to John Graham Peel and it was sold again to Harry Brooks in 1940. During the Second World War the house was requisitioned and used by General George Patton and his staff. The hall was also used as a prisoner of war camp, and as a resettlement home for allied prisoners of war and for English people repatriated after the partition of India. It was returned to the Brooks family in 1950. The 1760s wing was in poor condition and was demolished in 1964, taking the house from 21 to 11 bedrooms, other modifications were made too, including a new entrance.

== Architecture and contents ==
The house is built in red brick with stone dressings and a tiled roof. The early parts of the house are partly two-storeyed with gables and partly three-storeyed with flat roofs. The windows are mullioned and transomed. The house is roughly rectangular in shape with an entrance corridor which runs across its depth. On the left of the corridor is a small sitting room which contains woodwork and furniture from the 16th century. At the centre of the ground floor is the dining room which includes wooden pilasters which were formerly in Horsley Hall, Clwyd, and paintings and furniture from the 18th century. Also on the ground floor is the morning room in which is a set of bookcases from Oteley, a seat of the Mainwaring family in Shropshire. On the first floor are the drawing room and 5 bedrooms. The drawing room is in the centre of the building and contains early 18th-century panelling, 17th and 18th-century furniture, and another set of bookcases from Oteley. On the top floor are 6 further bedrooms and the long gallery which contains antique furniture and toys. The kitchen in the basement has two large fireplaces and it also contains arms and armour.

== Surrounding buildings and gardens ==
The stable block is dated 1654 and is listed at Grade I. It contains Tuscan style columns at the end of each stall and a decorated panelled ceiling. It is built in red brick on a stone plinth, with stone dressings and a slate roof. It is in two storey and has nine bays. On its roof is a cupola with a clock face. The coach house is listed at Grade II. Also listed at Grade II are ashlar gatepiers and wrought iron gates which came from Alderley Park, and a mounting block dating from the mid 18th century.

The hall has a formal garden and stands in a landscape park. The landscape park was probably landscaped by William Emes after the alterations to the house in 1764. The formal gardens were laid out between 1890 and 1905 for Sir Philip Tatton Mainwaring. They were remodelled by Hubert Worthington during the 1920s, and were further developed from the 1960s by the Brooks. The gardens are listed at Grade II on the Register of Parks and Gardens of Special Historic Interest in England. The gardens are open to the public at advertised times and tours of the house are available.

== See also ==
- Grade II* listed buildings in Cheshire East
- Listed buildings in Peover Superior
- St Lawrence's Church, Over Peover
