= Peover Superior =

Former civil parish in Cheshire, England

Coordinates: 53.265°N 2.345°W

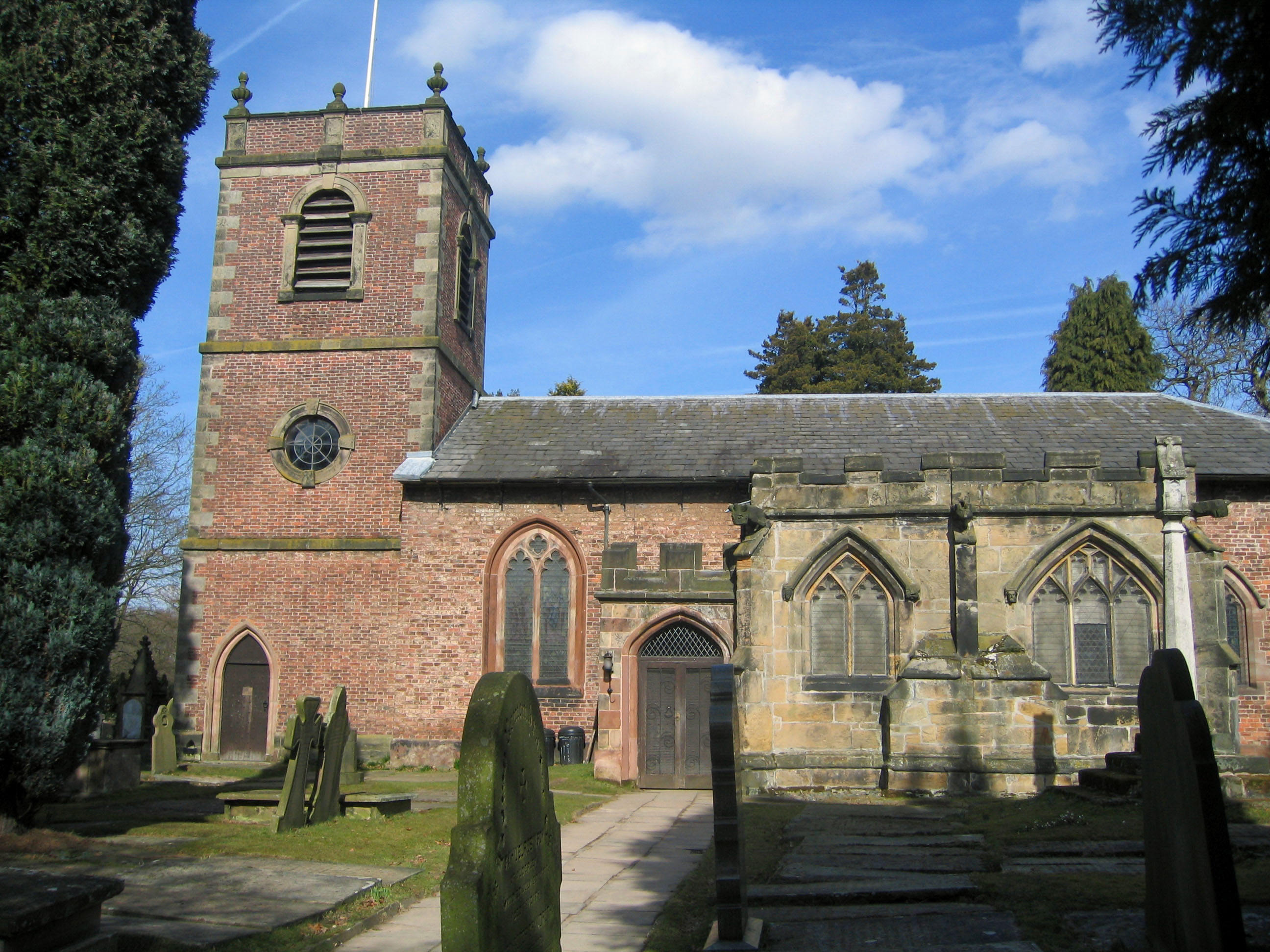
- St. Lawrence's Church

- Location within Cheshire
- Population: 666 (2011)
- OS grid reference: SJ769743
- Civil parish: Peover Superior and Snelson
- Unitary authority: Cheshire East
- Ceremonial county: Cheshire
- Region: North West
- Country: England
- Sovereign state: United Kingdom
- Post town: Knutsford
- Postcode district: WA16
- Dialling code: 01565
- Police: Cheshire
- Fire: Cheshire
- Ambulance: North West
- UK Parliament: Tatton

Peover Superior is a former civil parish, now in the parish of Peover Superior and Snelson, in the unitary authority area of Cheshire East and the ceremonial county of Cheshire, England. It is described by the Office for National Statistics as a village surrounded by inhabited countryside. The civil parish included the village of Over Peover and the hamlet of Peover Heath. In 2011 the parish had a population of 666.

Peover Superior is named after The Peover Eye river, which forms one of the parish boundaries. There is also a nearby village named Peover Inferior; the two areas are so named due to their standing on the river, with Peover Superior being higher up and Peover Inferior lower down on the river.

== The village ==
Peover Superior is home to St Lawrence's Church, Over Peover which is a designated National Heritage Grade I listed building. The church was first listed on 5 March 1959. The church was built in three stages which started in 1456 when the South Chapel was built. This was followed by the building of both the North Chapel and the Tower in 1648 and 1741 respectively. The Nave of the church was finished in 1811 and soon after the church was opened.

Peover Superior is also home to a primary school, Peover Superior Endowed Controlled Primary School which is situated in the centre of the village at the corner of Stocks Lane and Chelford Lane. The school holds up to 77 children.

There is also an established Cricket Club in the centre of the village, which has both first and second teams playing in Meller Braggins Cheshire Cricket League.

East Cheshire Sunday Football League team Peover FC play their home games in Over Peover at Peover park on Stocks Lane.

== History ==
In 1870–72, John Marius Wilson of the Imperial Gazetteer of England and Wales described Over Peover as:

A chapelry in Rostherne parish, Cheshire; on the river Peover. 2½ miles W S W of Chelford r. station, and 3½ S S E of Knutsford. It comprises the townships of Peover Superior, Marthall, and Snelson; and it has a post-office under Knutsford. Acres, 5,088. Real property, £9,055. Pop., 942. Houses, 178. The property is subdivided. The manor of Peover Superior, with Peover Hall, belongs to Sir H. Mainwaring, Bart. The living is a p. curacy in the diocese of Chester. Value, £180.* Patron, Sir H. Mainwaring, Bart. The church consists of nave, chancel, and two side chapels, with a tower; was mainly rebuilt in 1811; and contains monuments of the Mainwarings. There are a Wesleyan chapel, a free school, and charities £85.

From 1866 Peover Superior was a civil parish in its own right, on 1 April 2023 the parish was abolished and merged with Snelson to form "Peover Superior and Snelson".

Peover itself was part of the Bucklow Hundred, which was an ancient division of Cheshire that was introduced sometime before the Norman Conquest

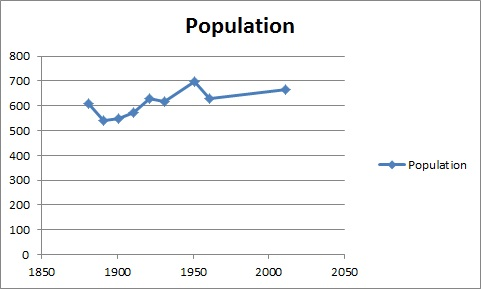
Peover Superior Population Time Series 1881 to 2011

== Population ==
According to the 2011 census, the population of Peover Superior was 666.

The population of Peover Superior has remained relatively stable for a number of decades, as seen in the Population time series.

== Occupational history ==
The figures used in the two bar charts came from the Neighbourhood Statistics Census Data.

The occupational structure of Peover Superior in 1881

The occupational history of Peover Superior has seen drastic changes; according to the 1881 statistics, it was a predominantly agricultural parish with a large number both of men and of women employed in this sector, who would have been working on farms and other agricultural work.

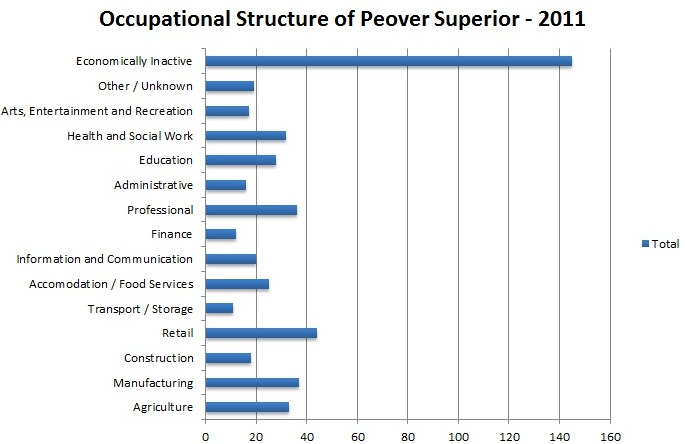
The occupational structure of Peover Superior in 2011.

Since then the structure of occupation has changed immensely. The 2011 data shows a much more varied occupational structure, with a shift away from the predominantly agricultural-based work seen in 1881. This mirrors trends all across the country; the amount of agricultural work has decreased and the number of people working in the service industry has risen sharply. There has also been a sharp increase in the number of professional people living in Peover Superior.

== Notable residents ==
- Lady Mary Anne Cust, writer, naturalist, born in Peover 1799*
- Sir Philip Mainwaring, statesman, born in Peover in 1589
- William Stobart – CEO of Eddie Stobart Logistics.
- John Ryan – former chairman of Doncaster Rovers F.C.

== See also ==
- Listed buildings in Peover Superior
- Mary Anne Cust
