= Grade II* listed buildings in Cheshire East =

There are over 20,000 Grade II* listed buildings in England. This page is a list of these buildings in the unitary authority of Cheshire East.

== Listed buildings ==
Name	Location	Type	Completed (Note: The date given is the date used by Historic England as significant for the initial building or that of an important part in the structure's description.)	Date designated	Grid ref. (Note: The grid reference is based on the British national grid reference system, sometimes known as OSGB36, used by the Ordnance Survey.) Geo-coordinates	Notes	Entry number (Note: The "List Entry Number" is a unique number assigned to each listed building and scheduled monument by Historic England.)	Image
Dorfold Dairy House	Dorfold Park, Acton	Farmhouse	Late 17th century	12 January 1967	SJ6320951897; 53°03′46″N 2°32′57″W		1138565	Dorfold Dairy House
Glebe House	Acton	House	1727 and later	12 January 1967	SJ6309953093; 53°04′25″N 2°33′03″W		1312848	Glebe House
Nantwich Aqueduct	Acton	Aqueduct	c.1826	7 January 1991	SJ6420352578; 53°04′08″N 2°32′04″W		1330146	Nantwich Aqueduct More images
Small gate in wall west of Dorfold Hall	Dorfold Park, Acton	Gate	Early 17th century	4 July 1986	SJ6352452532; 53°04′07″N 2°32′40″W		1138564	Small gate in wall west of Dorfold Hall
Adlington Hall Mews	Adlington	Coach house (now apartment)	1749	14 April 1967	SJ9054980441; 53°19′14″N 2°08′31″W		1366183	Upload Photo
Mill House Farmhouse and Cottage	Adlington	Farmhouse	1603	14 April 1967	SJ9071879007; 53°18′28″N 2°08′22″W		1234119	Upload Photo
Church of St Phillip	Alderley Edge	Church	1853	6 July 1984	SJ8418878628; 53°18′15″N 2°14′14″W		1138867	Church of St Phillip More images
Shropshire Union Canal Bunbury Locks	Shropshire Union Canal, Alpraham	Footbridge	Late 18th century	5 November 1991	SJ5780259031; 53°07′35″N 2°37′50″W		1115812	Shropshire Union Canal Bunbury Locks More images
Church of Christ	Alsager	Church	1789–90	26 March 1987	SJ7889355664; 53°05′51″N 2°18′55″W		1138754	Church of Christ More images
Arley Hall	Arley Hall, Aston By Budworth	House	1469	5 March 1959	SJ6755280927; 53°19′26″N 2°29′14″W		1329694	Arley Hall More images
Aston Park	Aston Park, Aston By Budworth	House	1715	5 March 1959	SJ6771778118; 53°17′56″N 2°29′04″W		1139509	Aston Park More images
Chapel of St Mary at Arley Hall	Arley Hall, Aston By Budworth	Chapel	1845	7 September 1979	SJ6755680968; 53°19′28″N 2°29′14″W		1139505	Chapel of St Mary at Arley Hall More images
The Old Grammar School	Audlem	Teacher's house	1655	10 June 1952	SJ6610243590; 52°59′18″N 2°30′18″W		1312614	The Old Grammar School
Hack House	Baddington	Farmhouse	Early 17th century	12 January 1967	SJ6493448632; 53°02′01″N 2°31′23″W		1312819	Upload Photo
Churchfield Farmhouse	Barthomley	Farmhouse	Early 17th century	14 June 1984	SJ7638652675; 53°04′14″N 2°21′09″W		1138707	Churchfield Farmhouse
The White Lion Inn	Barthomley	Public house	1614	10 June 1952	SJ7676352431; 53°04′06″N 2°20′49″W		1138700	The White Lion Inn More images
Dean Hill Farmhouse West	Betchton	Farmhouse	Late 16th–early 17th century	14 February 1967	SJ7808459423; 53°07′52″N 2°19′39″W		1161710	Dean Hill Farmhouse West
Bexton Hall and forecourt walls	Bexton	House	Late 17th century	5 March 1959	SJ7477076966; 53°17′20″N 2°22′43″W		1115558	Bexton Hall and forecourt walls More images
Church of St Mary the Virgin	Bosley	Church	c.1500	14 April 1967	SJ9181165546; 53°11′12″N 2°07′21″W		1138907	Church of St Mary the Virgin More images
Church of St Oswald	Brereton Green, Brereton	Church	c.1500	14 February 1967	SJ7814664787; 53°10′46″N 2°19′37″W		1229297	Church of St Oswald More images
Park Mill and Park Cottage	Brereton	House	c.1840	5 December 1986	SJ7735265846; 53°11′20″N 2°20′20″W		1138830	Park Mill and Park Cottage More images
The Bear's Head Hotel	Brereton	Jettied house	1615	6 June 1952	SJ7756164352; 53°10′32″N 2°20′09″W		1138789	The Bear's Head Hotel More images
Woodhouse Farmhouse	Buerton	Farmhouse	Late 17th or early 18th century	12 January 1967	SJ6770041609; 52°58′14″N 2°28′52″W		1330161	Woodhouse Farmhouse
Bulkeley Hall	Bulkeley	Country house	Mid-18th century	12 January 1967	SJ5232053768; 53°04′43″N 2°42′43″W		1138610	Bulkeley Hall More images
The Chantry House	Bunbury	House	1527	12 January 1967	SJ5683757958; 53°07′00″N 2°38′42″W		1138635	The Chantry House More images
Checkley Hall	Checkley cum Wrinehill	Country house	1690s	12 January 1967	SJ7325746187; 53°00′43″N 2°23′55″W		1312600	Checkley Hall More images
Church of St John	Chelford	Meeting hall	1967	14 April 1967	SJ8190773970; 53°15′44″N 2°16′17″W		1115561	Church of St John More images
The Lodge	Chelford	Lodge	Late 18th/early 19th century	14 April 1967	SJ8184173897; 53°15′41″N 2°16′20″W		1139334	Upload Photo
The Manor House	Chelford	House	Early 17th century	14 April 1967	SJ8202074170; 53°15′50″N 2°16′11″W		1139331	Upload Photo
Cholmondeley Castle	Cholmondeley Park, Cholmondeley	Country house	1801–04	10 June 1952	SJ5365151343; 53°03′25″N 2°41′30″W		1135794	Cholmondeley Castle More images
Gates and screen across the main (south-west) approach to Cholmondeley Castle	Cholmondeley Park, Cholmondeley	Gate	1722	12 January 1967	SJ5348751278; 53°03′23″N 2°41′39″W		1330124	Gates and screen across the main (south-west) approach to Cholmondeley Castle
Church of All Saints	Church Lawton	Church	Before 1555	14 February 1967	SJ8216455759; 53°05′54″N 2°15′59″W		1161743	Church of All Saints More images
Mill House	Church Minshull	House	Late 17th century	12 January 1967	SJ6667360746; 53°08′33″N 2°29′54″W		1135816	Mill House More images
Minshull Hall Farmhouse	Church Minshull	Farmhouse	Late 17th century	12 January 1967	SJ6550461262; 53°08′50″N 2°30′57″W		1138660	Upload Photo
The Church of St Bartholomew	Church Minshull	Parish church	1702	12 January 1967	SJ6661860594; 53°08′28″N 2°29′57″W		1313128	The Church of St Bartholomew More images
Wades Green Hall	Church Minshull	Farmhouse	Early 17th century	12 January 1967	SJ6560159693; 53°07′59″N 2°30′51″W		1138658	Upload Photo
Big Fenton	Buglawton, Congleton	Farmhouse	16th century	28 July 1950	SJ9000164775; 53°10′47″N 2°08′59″W		1106368	Upload Photo
Gate piers and gates of Number 61	Congleton	Gate	Mid-18th century	4 April 1975	SJ8543263058; 53°09′51″N 2°13′05″W		1130483	Gate piers and gates of Number 61 More images
Overton House	Congleton	House	Mid-18th century	28 July 1950	SJ8543363076; 53°09′52″N 2°13′04″W		1107940	Overton House More images
Town Hall	Congleton	Town hall	1864–66	13 August 1969	SJ8600662889; 53°09′46″N 2°12′34″W		1086996	Town Hall More images
Swan Farmhouse	Cranage	Farmhouse	Late 17th century	14 February 1967	SJ7540868387; 53°12′42″N 2°22′06″W		1231075	Upload Photo
Former stables at Crewe Hall	Crewe Hall Park, Crewe Green	Former stables	c.1636	20 January 1975	SJ7324353999; 53°04′56″N 2°23′58″W		1138667	Former stables at Crewe Hall More images
The Church of St Michael	Crewe Green, Crewe Green	Parish church	1857–59	20 January 1975	SJ7269355360; 53°05′40″N 2°24′28″W		1138674	The Church of St Michael More images
Church of St Mary	Disley	Church	1527–58	27 November 1963	SJ9747384510; 53°21′26″N 2°02′17″W		1231620	Church of St Mary More images
Butterley Heyes	Butterley Heys	Farmhouse	Early 17th century	12 January 1967	SJ6479441951; 52°58′24″N 2°31′28″W	This farmhouse originally had an H-shaped plan with later extensions; its two projecting wings have gables. There are two storeys with attics under a tiled roof, with a prominent brick chimneystack to the right-hand end. The timber frame has been infilled with brick; it features small framing with angle braces.	1136928	Butterley Heyes More images
Game larder to the centre of the service court at Combermere Abbey	Dodcott cum Wilkesley	Game larder	Early 19th century	19 May 1986	SJ5877044087; 52°59′32″N 2°36′52″W	This octagonal red-brick game larder, probably by the Irish Morrison family, stands on a stone plinth, with a porch to the east face. The shallow-pitched slate roof has large overhangs, and is topped with an octagonal wooden lantern, also slate roofed. The faces each have a two-light window headed with a cusp-shaped arch. The original ironwork on which game was hung remains in the interior.	1138528	Game larder to the centre of the service court at Combermere Abbey
Barn and farm buildings at Demesne Farm	Doddington Park, Doddington	Farm building	c.1771–90	5 September 1986	SJ7044347283; 53°01′18″N 2°26′26″W		1138505	Upload Photo
Woodhey Cross	Woodhey Green, Faddiley	Cross	Late Medieval	12 January 1967	SJ5773052642; 53°04′09″N 2°37′51″W		1136206	Woodhey Cross More images
Barn at New Hall Farm	Gawsworth	Barn	1707–12	14 April 1967	SJ8918669878; 53°13′32″N 2°09′43″W		1139502	Barn at New Hall Farm
Gawsworth New Hall	Gawsworth	Country house	1707–12	14 April 1967	SJ8919269835; 53°13′31″N 2°09′43″W		1159278	Gawsworth New Hall More images
Blackden Hall	Blackden, Goostrey	Farmhouse	Late 16th century	14 February 1967	SJ7869970384; 53°13′47″N 2°19′09″W		1231131	Blackden Hall More images
Church of St Luke	Goostrey	Parish church	1796	14 February 1967	SJ7793870022; 53°13′35″N 2°19′50″W		1231229	Church of St Luke More images
Crook Hall	Goostrey	Farmhouse	Late 16th century	14 February 1967	SJ7853471997; 53°14′39″N 2°19′18″W		1231132	Crook Hall More images
Baptist Chapel	Great Warford	Church house	Mid-17th century	14 April 1967	SJ8163077018; 53°17′22″N 2°16′32″W		1329677	Baptist Chapel More images
Handforth Hall	Handforth	Manor house	1562	30 March 1951	SJ8630783309; 53°20′46″N 2°12′21″W		1222483	Handforth Hall More images
Ball Farmhouse	Hankelow	Farmhouse	16th or early 17th century	12 January 1967	SJ6685045663; 53°00′25″N 2°29′39″W		1138537	Ball Farmhouse More images
Hankelow Hall	Hankelow	Country house	Early 18th century	20 September 1954	SJ6688146270; 53°00′45″N 2°29′37″W		1312531	Hankelow Hall More images
Hassall Hall and Hassall Hall Farmhouse	Hassall	Farmhouse	17th century	6 June 1952	SJ7707557317; 53°06′44″N 2°20′33″W		1161774	Hassall Hall and Hassall Hall Farmhouse More images
Hatherton Manor	Hatherton	Farmhouse	1703	12 January 1967	SJ6800646885; 53°01′05″N 2°28′37″W		1312575	Upload Photo
Whirley Hall	Henbury	House	c.1670	6 July 1984	SJ8763074608; 53°16′05″N 2°11′08″W		1329627	Whirley Hall More images
Chapel of St Mary	High Legh	Chapel	c.1581	5 March 1959	SJ7007183932; 53°21′04″N 2°26′59″W		1139516	Chapel of St Mary More images
Swineyard Hall Farmhouse	High Legh	House	19th century	5 March 1959	SJ6780883813; 53°21′00″N 2°29′01″W		1115517	Swineyard Hall Farmhouse More images
Cotton Hall	Holmes Chapel	Farmhouse	Late 15th century	14 February 1967	SJ7481967411; 53°12′10″N 2°22′37″W		1231500	Upload Photo
The Red Lion	Holmes Chapel, Holmes Chapel	Public house	Late 17th century	14 February 1967	SJ7622867246; 53°12′05″N 2°21′21″W		1231438	The Red Lion More images
Gates, piers, screen and wall at Hough Hall	Hough	Gate	Early 18th century	12 January 1967	SJ7080150740; 53°03′10″N 2°26′08″W		1137036	Upload Photo
Hough Hall	Hough	House	17th century	12 January 1967	SJ7083250812; 53°03′12″N 2°26′07″W		1138509	Upload Photo
Grove Mill	Kettleshulme	Boiler house	1823–25	16 July 1979	SJ9882080378; 53°19′12″N 2°01′04″W		1138938	Grove Mill More images
Bexton Croft, Toft Road	Knutsford	House	1896	15 January 1974	SJ7551477634; 53°17′42″N 2°22′08″W	A house designed by Baillie Scott, his first English commission, and considered to be one of his best early buildings.	1378495	Upload Photo
St Cross Church	Knutsford	Parish church	1880–81	15 January 1974	SJ7564878555; 53°18′12″N 2°22′01″W	A new church designed by Paley and Austin. It is built in brick with terracotta dressings in Perpendicular style, and has a tiled roof. Its plan includes a nave, north and south aisles, a four-stage tower at the crossing, and a chancel with north and south chapels. On the south is a two-storey vestry is on the south, with a porch is to the west of the north aisle.	1388414	St Cross Church More images
St John the Baptist's Church	Knutsford	Parish church	1741–44	18 January 1949	SJ7524778522; 53°18′11″N 2°22′22″W	The church was designed in neoclassical style by J. Garlive. It is constructed in brick with stone dressings, and has a slate roof. In 1879 the chancel was extended and reordered by Alfred Darbyshire.	1388324	St John the Baptist's Church More images
Former Kings Coffee House and Gaskell Memorial Tower	Knutsford	Tower	1907–08	18 January 1949	SJ7523878637; 53°18′15″N 2°22′23″W	Designed by William Longworth for Richard Harding Watt as a coffee house and council offices; used later as a restaurant. It consists of a main block for the offices, forming a courtyard, and the tower with an external staircase. It is constructed in rubble sandstone, with Portland stone at the top of the tower. Its architectural style is eclectic Italianate with Arts and Crafts elements. Its features include a smaller tower with a dome, a statue of Mrs Gaskell in a niche, a bronze medallion, and a pair of large Doric columns which were moved from St Peter's Church in Manchester.	1388360	Former Kings Coffee House and Gaskell Memorial Tower More images
Knutsford Lodge Gateway and gates to Tatton Park	Knutsford	Gate lodge	1810	18 January 1949	SJ7518979143; 53°18′31″N 2°22′25″W	Designed by Lewis Wyatt as an entrance to Tatton Park in ashlar stone. It consists of a triple gateway and a lodge on the west side. Each gateway contains a cast iron gate. The central gateway is flanked by Doric columns supporting an entablature.	1388387	Knutsford Lodge Gateway and gates to Tatton Park More images
Sessions House, Toft Road	Knutsford	House	1815–18	15 December 1954	SJ7515778436; 53°18′07″N 2°22′22″W	Designed by George Moneypenny as part of the gaol. It is constructed in ashlar stone with a portico of four Ionic columns, and has a bell-turret.	1378501	Sessions House, Toft Road More images
125 King Street	Knutsford	House	Early 18th century	18 January 1949	SJ7518278860; 53°18′22″N 2°22′26″W	A house, possibly originally an inn, part of which has since been used as offices. It is constructed in brick with stone dressings, and has a slate roof. An arched entry leads to the rear yard.	1388383	125 King Street
98 King Street	Knutsford	House	c.1750	18 January 1949	SJ7515878849; 53°18′21″N 2°22′22″W		1388377	Upload Photo
Lea Hall	Lea	House	16th century	12 January 1967	SJ7145648925; 53°02′12″N 2°25′33″W		1138514	Lea Hall More images
Roman sarcophagus in garden at Withington Hall	Lower Withington	Sarcophagus	Early C3	28 November 1984	SJ8114472221; 53°14′47″N 2°16′57″W		1107883	Upload Photo
The Cage	Lyme Park Country Park, Lyme Handley	Estate cottage	1737	14 April 1967	SJ9663683070; 53°20′39″N 2°03′02″W		1277283	The Cage More images
The Lantern	Lyme Park Country Park, Lyme Handley	Belvedere	c.1580	17 November 1983	SJ9721182390; 53°20′17″N 2°02′31″W		1277282	The Lantern More images
The Orangery	Lyme Park Country Park, Lyme Handley	Estate cottage	1815	14 April 1967	SJ9651982378; 53°20′17″N 2°03′08″W		1277341	The Orangery More images
Barclays Bank	Macclesfield	Bank (financial)	1841–42	14 April 1949	SJ9183373309; 53°15′23″N 2°07′21″W		1279973	Barclays Bank More images
Bate Hall Public House	Macclesfield	House	Late C16 or Early C17	17 March 1977	SJ9160273775; 53°15′38″N 2°07′33″W		1218601	Bate Hall Public House More images
Brunswick House (former Brunswick Methodist Church)	Macclesfield	Wesleyan Methodist chapel	1823	17 March 1977	SJ9189472996; 53°15′13″N 2°07′17″W		1206897	Brunswick House (former Brunswick Methodist Church) More images
Charles Roe House	Macclesfield	House	c.1700	14 April 1949	SJ9153073762; 53°15′38″N 2°07′37″W		1206903	Charles Roe House More images
Christ Church	Macclesfield	Church	1775	14 April 1949	SJ9139673528; 53°15′30″N 2°07′44″W		1206916	Christ Church More images
Church of St Alban	Macclesfield	Roman Catholic church	1839–41	17 March 1977	SJ9116073662; 53°15′35″N 2°07′57″W		1206898	Church of St Alban More images
Church of St Michael	Macclesfield	Church	13th century	14 April 1949	SJ9179773706; 53°15′36″N 2°07′23″W		1206932	Church of St Michael More images
Cumberland House	Macclesfield	House	Early 18th century	14 April 1949	SJ9169573908; 53°15′43″N 2°07′28″W		1291368	Cumberland House More images
Forecourt wall, piers, railings and gates to Jordangate House	Macclesfield	Gate	c.1730	17 March 1977	SJ9171873903; 53°15′42″N 2°07′27″W		1219744	Forecourt wall, piers, railings and gates to Jordangate House
Jordangate House	Macclesfield	House	1728	14 April 1949	SJ9172773904; 53°15′42″N 2°07′27″W		1206920	Jordangate House More images
Macclesfield Arms Hotel	Macclesfield	Hotel	Late 18th century	14 April 1949	SJ9170973849; 53°15′41″N 2°07′28″W		1280005	Macclesfield Arms Hotel More images
Macclesfield Sunday School (now Macclesfield Heritage Centre)	Macclesfield	School	1813	4 February 1975	SJ9158273455; 53°15′28″N 2°07′34″W		1206950	Macclesfield Sunday School (now Macclesfield Heritage Centre) More images
Park Green House	Macclesfield	House	Late 18th century	14 April 1949	SJ9192473262; 53°15′22″N 2°07′16″W		1290516	Upload Photo
Showroom premises of Messrs Arighi Bianchi	Macclesfield	Silk mill	1883	18 September 1973	SJ9196973757; 53°15′38″N 2°07′13″W		1291854	Showroom premises of Messrs Arighi Bianchi More images
Town Hall	Macclesfield	Town hall	1824	17 March 1977	SJ9174873738; 53°15′37″N 2°07′25″W		1206935	Town Hall More images
Unitarian Chapel	Macclesfield	Unitarian chapel	1690	14 April 1949	SJ9168073805; 53°15′39″N 2°07′29″W		1291252	Unitarian Chapel More images
Whitfield House	Macclesfield	House	c.1838	17 March 1977	SJ9067974161; 53°15′51″N 2°08′23″W		1221127	Whitfield House More images
Church of St Michael	Marbury cum Quoisley	Church	16th century	12 January 1967	SJ5605245636; 53°00′21″N 2°39′18″W		1225604	Church of St Michael More images
Church of St Michael and All Angels	High Town, Middlewich	Church	12th century	5 December 1986	SJ7039066250; 53°11′32″N 2°26′36″W		1138795	Church of St Michael and All Angels More images
64 St Ann's Road	Middlewich	House	Late 17th century	5 December 1986	SJ7010165960; 53°11′23″N 2°26′51″W		1330028	64 St Ann's Road
Antrobus Hall, garden wall and gatepiers	Mobberley	House	Dated 1709	5 March 1959	SJ8012278917; 53°18′24″N 2°17′54″W		1329643	Antrobus Hall, garden wall and gatepiers More images
Dukenfield Hall	Mobberley	House	Early and mid-17th century	5 March 1959	SJ7723979579; 53°18′45″N 2°20′30″W		1230099	Dukenfield Hall More images
The Old Hall	Mobberley	House	Early 17th century	5 March 1959	SJ7924679700; 53°18′49″N 2°18′42″W		1139557	The Old Hall More images
Great Moreton Hall	Moreton cum Alcumlow	Country house	1841–43	14 February 1967	SJ8394759493; 53°07′55″N 2°14′24″W		1138736	Great Moreton Hall More images
Lowerhouse Farmhouse	Mottram St. Andrew	Farmhouse	Mid-16th century	14 April 1967	SJ8669778602; 53°18′14″N 2°11′59″W		1138875	Lowerhouse Farmhouse More images
Mottram Hall Hotel	Mottram St. Andrew	House	c.1750	25 July 1952	SJ8854579402; 53°18′40″N 2°10′19″W		1234766	Mottram Hall Hotel More images
Mottram Old Hall	Mottram St. Andrew	Fortified house	16th century	25 July 1952	SJ8835379119; 53°18′31″N 2°10′29″W		1138842	Upload Photo
Dysart Buildings, 1–9 Monks Lane	Nantwich	House	1778–79	19 April 1948	SJ6534252361; 53°04′02″N 2°31′07″W	Dysart Buildings is a terrace of nine three-storey town houses in red brick, with projecting bays at the ends of the terrace. It was built by Lionel Tollemache, fifth Earl of Dysart.	1249422	Dysart Buildings, 1–9 Monks Lane More images
9 Mill Street	Nantwich	Town house	c.1736; 19th-century additions	28 January 1999	SJ6504852219; 53°03′58″N 2°31′23″W	This five-bay town house in red brick with stone dressings has two storeys with attics. The slightly projecting central bay is flanked by brick pilasters and topped with a pediment. There is a cornice with a parapet above. Formerly used as a bank and a political club, it is now a restaurant.	1263769	9 Mill Street More images
Townwell House, 52 Welsh Row	Nantwich	House	1740	19 April 1948	SJ6478852439; 53°04′05″N 2°31′37″W	Townwell House is a town house of three storeys and five bays, in red brick with stone dressings. It has decorative quoins and a stone string course. A contemporary two-storey coach house stands at the rear.	1263708	Townwell House, 52 Welsh Row More images
Wright's Almshouses, Beam Street	Nantwich	Almshouse	1638	19 April 1948	SJ6570652137; 53°04′08″N 2°31′01″W	Wright's Almshouses are a terrace of six two-storey almshouses built by Sir Edmund Wright, in brick with stone dressings. They bear a central stone panel with arms. Originally on London Road, the almshouses were moved to stand adjacent to the Crewe Almshouses in 1973–75. They are now used as sheltered housing for the elderly.	1039555	Wright's Almshouses, Beam Street More images
Forecourt wall and gateway of Wright's Almshouses, Beam Street	Nantwich	Gate	1667	1 March 1974	SJ6544652562; 53°04′09″N 2°31′02″W	The arched stone gateway to Wright's Almshouses is flanked by columns and side scrolls; it is surrounded by a low red-brick wall with a stone coping. Originally on London Road, the gateway was moved with the almshouses in 1973–75.	1320247	Forecourt wall and gateway of Wright's Almshouses, Beam Street More images
46 High Street	Nantwich	Building	c. 1584	19 April 1948	SJ6509952305; 53°04′01″N 2°31′20″W	This timber-framed, two-gabled black-and-white merchant's house probably dates from shortly after the 1583 fire, and was built for Thomas Churche. It has two storeys with attics, with ornamental panelling, jetties and corbels decorated with carved human figures and animals. It is now a shop and coffee shop.	1206205	46 High Street More images
83 Welsh Row	Nantwich	House	Late 18th century	19 April 1948	SJ6466852394; 53°04′03″N 2°31′43″W	This town house in red brick has five storeys and five bays, with a stone cornice. The central slightly projecting bay is topped a pediment. By the main entrance are railings dating from the late 19th century. It is now used as offices.	1249536	83 Welsh Row More images
Church Hall	Nether Alderley	Church hall	1628	14 April 1967	SJ8417876108; 53°16′54″N 2°14′20″W		1216836	Church Hall More images
Nether Alderley Mill and dam wall	Nether Alderley	Mill	Late 16th century	25 July 1952	SJ8434076239; 53°16′57″N 2°14′06″W		1139592	Nether Alderley Mill and dam wall More images
Soss Moss Hall	Nether Alderley	Farmhouse	1583	25 July 1952	SJ8281175891; 53°16′47″N 2°15′33″W		1221317	Upload Photo
The Old Hall	Nether Alderley	Hall	Late 16th century	14 April 1967	SJ8436076302; 53°16′59″N 2°14′05″W		1139591	The Old Hall More images
Astbury Rectory	Newbold Astbury	Vicarage	Mid-18th century	14 February 1967	SJ8470861668; 53°09′06″N 2°13′43″W		1138744	Astbury Rectory
Canopied tomb of a member of the Venables family in churchyard of St Mary at NGR 8463 6158	Newbold Astbury	Tomb	Late 13th century	26 March 1987	SJ8463561552; 53°09′02″N 2°13′47″W		1161887	Canopied tomb of a member of the Venables family in churchyard of St Mary at NGR 8463 6158
Glebe Farmhouse	Newbold Astbury	Farmhouse	18th century	14 February 1967	SJ8466961493; 53°09′00″N 2°13′45″W		1309873	Glebe Farmhouse
Ashbank Farmhouse	Scholar Green, Odd Rode	Farmhouse	Late 16th–early 17th century	26 March 1987	SJ8209256260; 53°06′11″N 2°16′03″W		1330044	Ashbank Farmhouse
Barn at Little Moreton Hall Farm	Odd Rode	Barn	15th century	14 February 1967	SJ8331858903; 53°07′36″N 2°14′58″W		1138748	Barn at Little Moreton Hall Farm More images
Church of All Saints	Scholar Green, Odd Rode	Church	1863	14 February 1967	SJ8240257481; 53°06′50″N 2°15′47″W		1161954	Church of All Saints More images
Ramsdell Hall including former stable block	Odd Rode	Country house	Early/mid-18th century	14 February 1967	SJ8427458093; 53°07′10″N 2°14′06″W		1138715	Ramsdell Hall including former stable block More images
Rode Hall	Odd Rode	Country house	c.1700	6 June 1952	SJ8189057336; 53°06′45″N 2°16′14″W		1138746	Rode Hall More images
Church of St Catherine	Over Alderley	Church	1840	14 April 1967	SJ8626474793; 53°16′11″N 2°12′22″W		1139604	Church of St Catherine More images
Hayman's House	Over Alderley	House	1528	14 April 1967	SJ8550576137; 53°16′54″N 2°13′03″W		1139606	Hayman's House More images
Black and White Cottage	Peckforton	Timber-framed house	Late 17th century	12 January 1967	SJ5384056519; 53°06′13″N 2°41′22″W	Stone House Lane, Peckforton	1330119	Black and White Cottage More images
Chapel in the ward of Peckforton Castle	Peckforton	Chapel	Mid-19th century	29 October 1984	SJ5329758020; 53°07′01″N 2°41′52″W		1138621	Chapel in the ward of Peckforton Castle
Entrance Lodge south-east of Peckforton Castle	Peckforton	Turret	Mid-19th century	29 October 1984	SJ5380357557; 53°06′46″N 2°41′25″W		1313148	Entrance Lodge south-east of Peckforton Castle More images
Peckforton Hall	Peckforton	Farmhouse	Late 17th century	12 January 1967	SJ5449056636; 53°06′17″N 2°40′47″W		1313276	Upload Photo
Peover Hall	Peover Hall Park, Peover Superior	Country house	1585	5 March 1959	SJ7726873496; 53°15′28″N 2°20′27″W		1329813	Peover Hall More images
Holford Hall	Plumley	House	Mid-17th century	5 March 1959	SJ7089675445; 53°16′30″N 2°26′11″W		1329664	Holford Hall More images
Poole Hall	Poole	Country house	1817	12 January 1967	SJ6455755137; 53°05′31″N 2°31′46″W		1136492	Upload Photo
Salesian Missionary College	Shrigley Park, Pott Shrigley	Country house	c.1825	25 July 1952	SJ9426179805; 53°18′54″N 2°05′10″W		1232168	Salesian Missionary College More images
National Westminster Bank	Prestbury	House	16th century	25 July 1952	SJ9000576954; 53°17′21″N 2°09′00″W		1329653	National Westminster Bank More images
Spittle House (west range only)	Prestbury	House	Perhaps 14th century	6 July 1984	SJ8964677782; 53°17′48″N 2°09′19″W		1139569	Spittle House (west range only)
Willot Hall	Prestbury	Farmhouse	Late 15th century	25 July 1952	SJ8881780287; 53°19′09″N 2°10′04″W		1221901	Upload Photo
Charles Head House	Rainow	Manor house	Late 16th/early 17th century	9 December 1983	SJ9790078783; 53°18′21″N 2°01′53″W		1136702	Charles Head House
Church of St John the Baptist	Saltersford, Rainow	Church	1733	14 April 1967	SJ9838676589; 53°17′10″N 2°01′27″W		1138927	Church of St John the Baptist More images
Sowcar Farmhouse	Rainow	Farmhouse	Early 17th century	9 December 1983	SJ9429877938; 53°17′53″N 2°05′08″W		1138917	Upload Photo
Gatehouse to former Ridley Hall	Ridley	Gatehouse	c.1530	29 October 1984	SJ5470254759; 53°05′16″N 2°40′35″W		1138584	Upload Photo
Black Bear Inn	Sandbach	House	1634	11 August 1950	SJ7584160816; 53°08′37″N 2°21′40″W		1159872	Black Bear Inn More images
Church of St Mary	Sandbach	Anglican church	15th century	11 August 1950	SJ7595360775; 53°08′36″N 2°21′34″W		1330401	Church of St Mary More images
Capesthorne Hall and garden wall surrounding Entrance Court	Capesthorne Park, Siddington	Country house	1719	14 April 1967	SJ8404072768; 53°15′05″N 2°14′21″W		1104882	Capesthorne Hall and garden wall surrounding Entrance Court More images
Chapel of the Holy Trinity	Capesthorne Park, Siddington	Chapel	1722	14 April 1967	SJ8401272728; 53°15′04″N 2°14′23″W		1139279	Upload Photo
Church of All Saints	Siddington	Church	Late 16th century	14 April 1967	SJ8462670833; 53°14′02″N 2°13′49″W		1106256	Church of All Saints More images
Chapel at Somerford Hall	Somerford	Chapel	1720	14 February 1967	SJ8148264848; 53°10′48″N 2°16′38″W		1309761	Chapel at Somerford Hall More images
Somerford Booths Hall	Somerford Booths	Country house	1612	6 June 1952	SJ8307565536; 53°11′11″N 2°15′12″W		1138721	Somerford Booths Hall More images
The Bath House	Spurstow	Farmhouse	Late 16th century	12 January 1967	SJ5695155324; 53°05′35″N 2°38′34″W		1312873	The Bath House
Quarry Bank Mill	Styal	Cotton mill	1784	30 March 1951	SJ8344382988; 53°20′36″N 2°14′55″W		1237687	Quarry Bank Mill More images
The Apprentices House and Apprentices House Cottage	Styal	Museum	1790	6 March 1975	SJ8366983212; 53°20′43″N 2°14′43″W		1237685	The Apprentices House and Apprentices House Cottage More images
Oak Farmhouse	Styal	Farmhouse	Early 16th century	30 March 1951	SJ8341683646; 53°20′57″N 2°14′57″W		1222266	Oak Farmhouse More images
Chapel and Chaplain's House c.7 yards east of Sutton Hall	Sutton	Chapel	16th century	14 April 1967	SJ9255571517; 53°14′25″N 2°06′42″W		1159446	Upload Photo
Langley Hall	Sutton	House	1696	14 April 1967	SJ9383871602; 53°14′28″N 2°05′32″W		1139480	Langley Hall More images
Church of St Peter	Swettenham	Parish church	c.1717	14 February 1967	SJ8008767185; 53°12′04″N 2°17′53″W		1231569	Church of St Peter More images
Clonterbrook House	Swettenham Heath, Swettenham	Timber-framed house	Dated 1697	14 February 1967	SJ8214767235; 53°12′06″N 2°16′02″W		1277466	Upload Photo
Tabley Old Hall	Tabley Inferior	House	c.1670	3 September 1984	SJ7197777382; 53°17′33″N 2°25′14″W		1139011	Tabley Old Hall More images
Palm House to west of Orangery	Tatton Park, Tatton	Glasshouse	c.1860	20 September 1984	SJ7438681508; 53°19′47″N 2°23′05″W		1139535	Palm House to west of Orangery More images
Tatton Old Hall	Tatton Park, Tatton	House	17th century	5 March 1959	SJ7562981282; 53°19′39″N 2°21′57″W		1329674	Tatton Old Hall More images
Toft Hall	Toft	Country house	Late 17th century	15 December 1981	SJ7538976262; 53°16′57″N 2°22′09″W		1106302	Toft Hall More images
Wardle Old Hall	Wardle	Farmhouse	Early 18th century	10 June 1952	SJ6118357130; 53°06′35″N 2°34′48″W		1312857	Wardle Old Hall
Church House	Warmingham	Farmhouse	Late 16th century	12 January 1967	SJ7088060994; 53°08′42″N 2°26′07″W		1310880	Church House More images
The Church of St Leonard	Warmingham	Parish church	1715	12 January 1967	SJ7090261074; 53°08′45″N 2°26′06″W		1330059	The Church of St Leonard More images
Hollyhedge Farmhouse	Weston	Farmhouse	Late 16th/early 17th century	12 January 1967	SJ7333853112; 53°04′27″N 2°23′53″W		1312453	Upload Photo
Crag Hall	Wildboarclough, Macclesfield Forest and Wildboarclough	House	c.1915	14 April 1967	SJ9878668809; 53°12′58″N 2°01′05″W		1329979	Crag Hall More images
Midgeley Gate Farmhouse	Wildboarclough, Macclesfield Forest and Wildboarclough	House	Early 17th century	7 November 1983	SJ9950366377; 53°11′39″N 2°00′27″W		1145874	Upload Photo
Willaston Hall	Willaston	Country house	1737	10 June 1952	SJ6738452539; 53°04′08″N 2°29′13″W		1138556	Upload Photo
Dean Row Unitarian Chapel	Wilmslow	Presbyterian chapel	c.1695	30 March 1951	SJ8710281544; 53°19′49″N 2°11′37″W		1222055	Dean Row Unitarian Chapel More images
Friends Meeting House	Wilmslow	Friends meeting house	1830	26 November 1981	SJ8399581115; 53°19′35″N 2°14′25″W		1222185	Friends Meeting House More images
Pownall Hall (school)	Wilmslow	House	c.1833	7 December 1973	SJ8366481887; 53°20′00″N 2°14′43″W		1222471	Pownall Hall (school) More images
Hawthorn Hall and parts of front garden walls	Wilmslow	House	1698	6 July 1984	SJ8426281282; 53°19′41″N 2°14′11″W		1237621	Upload Photo
Wincle Grange Farmhouse	Wincle	House	Early 18th century	25 July 1952	SJ9554865412; 53°11′08″N 2°04′00″W		1138880	Wincle Grange Farmhouse More images
West End	Wistaston	Farmhouse	Early 17th century	12 January 1967	SJ6783654655; 53°05′16″N 2°28′49″W		1228816	Upload Photo
Church of St Margaret	Wrenbury cum Frith	Church	Early 16th century	12 January 1967	SJ5936447768; 53°01′31″N 2°36′21″W	St Margaret's is a parish church in red sandstone ashlar under a tile roof. The five-bay clerestoried nave and chancel have battlemented parapets. The west tower has battlements and pinnacles to its corners; an octagonal stair turret climbs to its roof.	1357455	Church of St Margaret More images
Wrenbury Church Bridge	Llangollen Canal, Wrenbury cum Frith	Bridge	c.1790	19 May 1986	SJ5943248070; 53°01′41″N 2°36′18″W	Wrenbury Church Bridge (no. 19) is a single-span timber lift bridge by Thomas Telford. It is an accommodation bridge and also serves a public footpath. The bridge is lifted manually via a counterbalancing weight fixed to paired beams parallel to the bridge platform and attached to its free end with chains. Vertical beams support the structure, and the timberwork is strengthened with iron rods. Guards were installed in 1889.	1357482	Wrenbury Church Bridge More images
Wrenbury Frith Bridge	Llangollen Canal, Wrenbury cum Frith	Bridge	c.1790	19 May 1986	SJ5844047612; 53°01′26″N 2°37′11″W	Wrenbury Frith Bridge (no. 21) is a single-span timber lift bridge by Thomas Telford. It is an accommodation bridge with no public right of way. The bridge is lifted manually via a counterbalancing weight fixed to paired beams parallel to the bridge platform and attached to its free end with chains. Vertical beams support the structure, and the timberwork is strengthened with iron rods. The bridge has no guard rails.	1357424	Wrenbury Frith Bridge More images
Tower of former Church of St Chad	Wybunbury	Tower	15th or 16th century	12 January 1967	SJ7000449872; 53°02′42″N 2°26′51″W		1279389	Tower of former Church of St Chad More images

== See also ==
- Grade I listed buildings in Cheshire East
- Grade II* listed buildings in Cheshire
  - Grade II* listed buildings in Cheshire West and Chester
  - Grade II* listed buildings in Cheshire East
  - Grade II* listed buildings in Warrington
  - Grade II* listed buildings in Halton (borough)

== Sources ==
- de Figueiredo, Peter; Treuherz, Julian (1988). Cheshire Country Houses. Phillimore.
- Hartwell, Clare; Hyde, Matthew; Hubbard, Edward; Pevsner, Nikolaus (2011) [1971], Cheshire, The Buildings of England, New Haven and London: Yale University Press, ISBN 978-0-300-17043-6
