= St Mary's Chapel, Arley =

Coordinates: 53.3246°N 2.4886°W

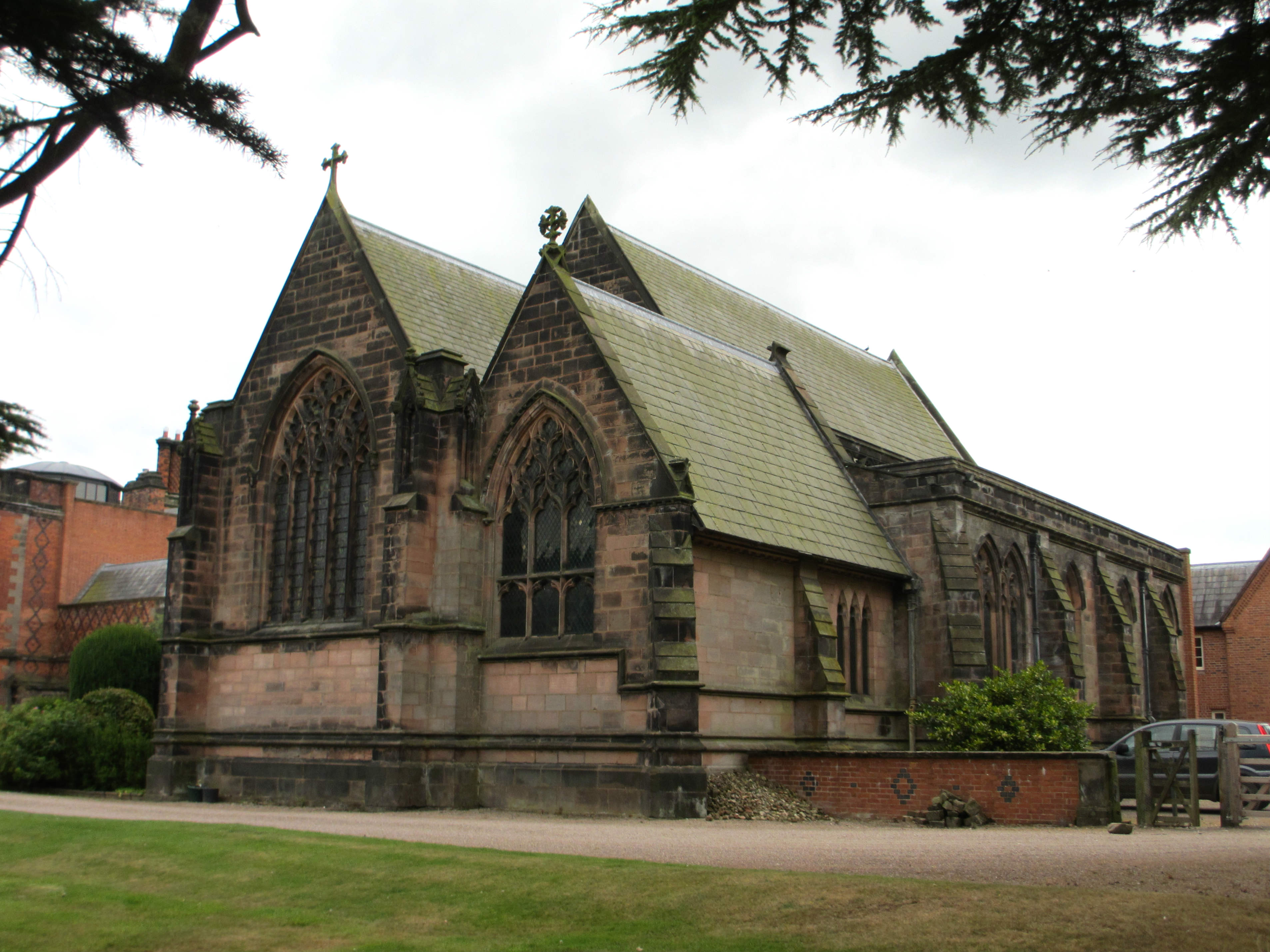
- St Mary's Chapel, Arley

- Location in Cheshire
- OS grid reference: SJ 675,810
- Location: Arley, Cheshire
- Country: England
- Denomination: Anglican

History
- Founder: Rowland Egerton-Warburton
- Consecrated: September 1845

Architecture
- Functional status: Private chapel
- Heritage designation: Grade II*
- Designated: 7 September 1979
- Architect(s): Anthony Salvin; G. E. Street
- Architectural type: Chapel
- Style: Gothic Revival
- Completed: 1845

Specifications
- Materials: Sandstone and rendered brick Tile and slate roofs.

St Mary's Chapel is the private chapel to Arley Hall, near the village of Arley, Cheshire, England. It is recorded in the National Heritage List for England as a designated Grade II* listed building. The chapel is situated to the northeast of the hall.

== History ==
Arley Hall was rebuilt between 1832 and 1845 for its owner Rowland Egerton-Warburton. The hall was in Jacobean style but Egerton-Warburton, an Anglo-Catholic influenced by the Oxford Movement, decided that its chapel should be in Gothic style and commissioned Anthony Salvin to design it. The chapel was consecrated in September 1845. In 1856–57 a north aisle and entrance porch designed by G. E. Street were added.

== Architecture ==
=== Exterior ===
The chapel is constructed in red sandstone ashlar and rendered brick, with tile and slate roofs. Its plan consists of a four-bay nave with a north aisle, a south porch, a two-bay chancel, and an octagonal bellcote. The porch originally connected the chapel with the house. The chapel is in Decorated style. In the south wall is a two-light mullioned window, and a projecting two-storey bay (the former porch) that has a rendered south wall. The west wall is plain. The east wall contains an oriel window supported by a buttress carved with beasts. On each side of this is a small lancet window. In the angle between the south projection and the nave is the bellcote. In its southeast wall is a single lancet window, and in the bell stage are eight more lancets. The north wall contains two two-light mullioned windows, buttresses and gargoyles. At the east end of the nave is an angled buttress containing a niche with a statue of the Virgin and Child. Around the nave and chancel is a pierced parapet. The south wall of the chancel contains two two-light windows with Decorated tracery, a priest's door, and buttresses, above which are gargoyles, and a crocketed pinnacle. The east wall has two windows, one to the aisle, and the other to the chancel.

=== Interior ===
The nave roof is supported on corbels decorated with carved angels holding shields, each of which is different. Along the south wall of the nave is a string course decorated with ballflowers. The north arcade is of three bays whose columns have capitals carved with foliage. In the church are three corona chandeliers. The lectern was made by Singer of Frome. The screen was designed by Street and is painted polychromatically, as is a radiator grill hiding central heating. The latter is in the style of a 13th-century tomb, and is decorated with lily finials. The font consists of a bowl carved with foliage and the Agnus Dei, supported by marble columns. In the chancel is a piscina and a triple sedilia. The east window contains glass designed by Kempe.

== Present day ==
The chapel, together with the hall and gardens, is open to visitors at advertised times.

== See also ==
- Grade II* listed buildings in Cheshire East
- Listed buildings in Aston by Budworth
- List of new churches by Anthony Salvin
