= Pownall Hall =

Country house in Cheshire, England

Coordinates: 53.33378°N 2.24643°W

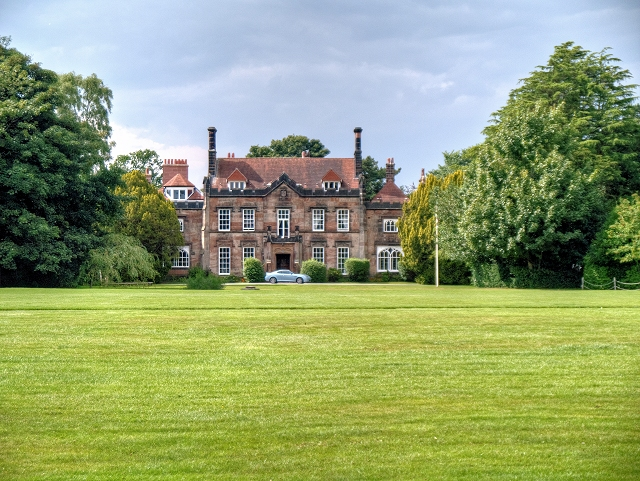
Pownall Hall

Pownall Hall is a former country house in Wilmslow, Cheshire, England. It was remodelled in 1830 as "a red sandstone Georgian house dressed up in the Tudor style". In 1886 it was bought by the Manchester brewer Henry Boddington, who transformed it "into a showcase for the most up-to-date work of the Arts and Crafts Movement". The architect was William Ball of the Ball and Elce partnership of Manchester. Much of the decoration and furniture design was carried out by members of the Century Guild, an organisation founded in 1882 by A. H. Mackmurdo. In addition "lots of pretty, small-scale bits of decoration" were added to the façade. The house is recorded in the National Heritage List for England as a designated Grade II* listed building. In 1934, the house and 8 acres of land surrounding it became Pownall Hall School. Originally a boys school until it became co-educational in 1998, Pownall Hall School is an independent prep school for children aged 6 months old to 11 years old.

== See also ==
- Grade II* listed buildings in Cheshire East
- Listed buildings in Wilmslow
