= Baptist Chapel, Great Warford =

Chapel in Cheshire, England

Coordinates: 53.28984°N 2.27691°W

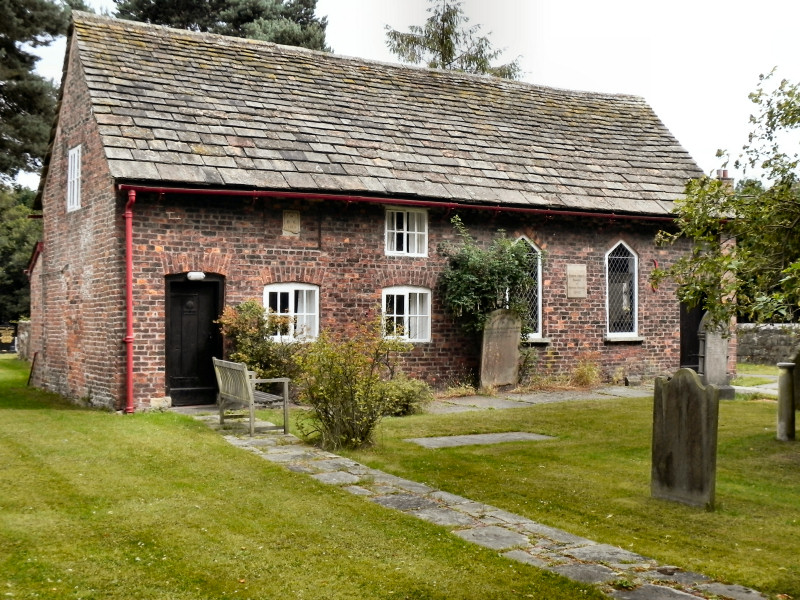
- Great Warford Baptist Chapel

- Location in Cheshire
- OS grid reference: SJ 816 770
- Location: Merryman's Lane, Great Warford, Cheshire
- Country: England
- Denomination: Baptist

History
- Status: Baptist chapel

Architecture
- Heritage designation: Grade II*
- Designated: 14 April 1967
- Architectural type: Chapel
- Completed: 1813

Specifications
- Capacity: 62
- Length: 24 feet (7 m)
- Width: 15 feet (5 m)
- Materials: North wall timber framing with brick infill; other walls brick Roof Kerridge stone slabs

Baptist Chapel, Great Warford is located in Merryman's Lane in the village of Great Warford, Cheshire, England. It is recorded in the National Heritage List for England as a designated Grade II* listed building.

== History ==
In 1712 a group of dissenters, who had been meeting in local farmhouses, acquired this building. At that time it consisted of a contiguous barn and cottage. The barn was converted into a meeting place for the worshippers. The early trustees were prominent Baptists. In 1813 the building was divided into two, the west part becoming a cottage for the minister and the east end continuing as the chapel.

== Architecture ==
=== Exterior ===
The building was originally timber-framed with wattle and daub infill. In the 1813 rebuilding the south, east and west walls were replaced by brick and it is likely that the infill in the north wall was replaced by brick. The north wall is still timber-framed with ten oak uprights and four horizontals at different levels. On its ground floor are three two-light casement windows and on the first floor two two-light casement windows which are placed irregularly. The south front is in six bays. The two-storey cottage on the left has to the west a splayed-head doorway. To the right on the ground floor are two two-light windows and on the first floor one two-light window and a datestone inscribed "WBC 1813". The chapel has two triangular-headed lancet windows with stone cills and a door similar to that of the cottage. Between the windows is a plaque inscribed "Great Warford Baptist Chapel Founded at Norbury Houses 1642". The east front has one triangular-headed lancet window. On the west front is a blocked doorway and a two-light casement window on the first floor. The roof is original with Kerridge stone slabs.

=== Interior ===
The interior of the chapel measures 24 feet (7 m) by 15 feet (5 m). The roof is supported by two central posts. At the east end is a gallery. All the furniture is original. The pulpit is in the middle of the dividing wall facing the gallery. The chapel contains five 19th-century box pews to the north and four to the south. In the centre of a pew on the north side is a coke stove. The chapel can seat 62 people. The registers begin in 1757.

== Use for filming ==
The chapel was used as a filming location for a wedding scene in the TV series Cousin Phillis.

== See also ==
- Grade II* listed buildings in Cheshire East
- Listed buildings in Great Warford
