= Aston by Budworth =

Civil parish in Cheshire, England

Coordinates: 53.301°N 2.466°W

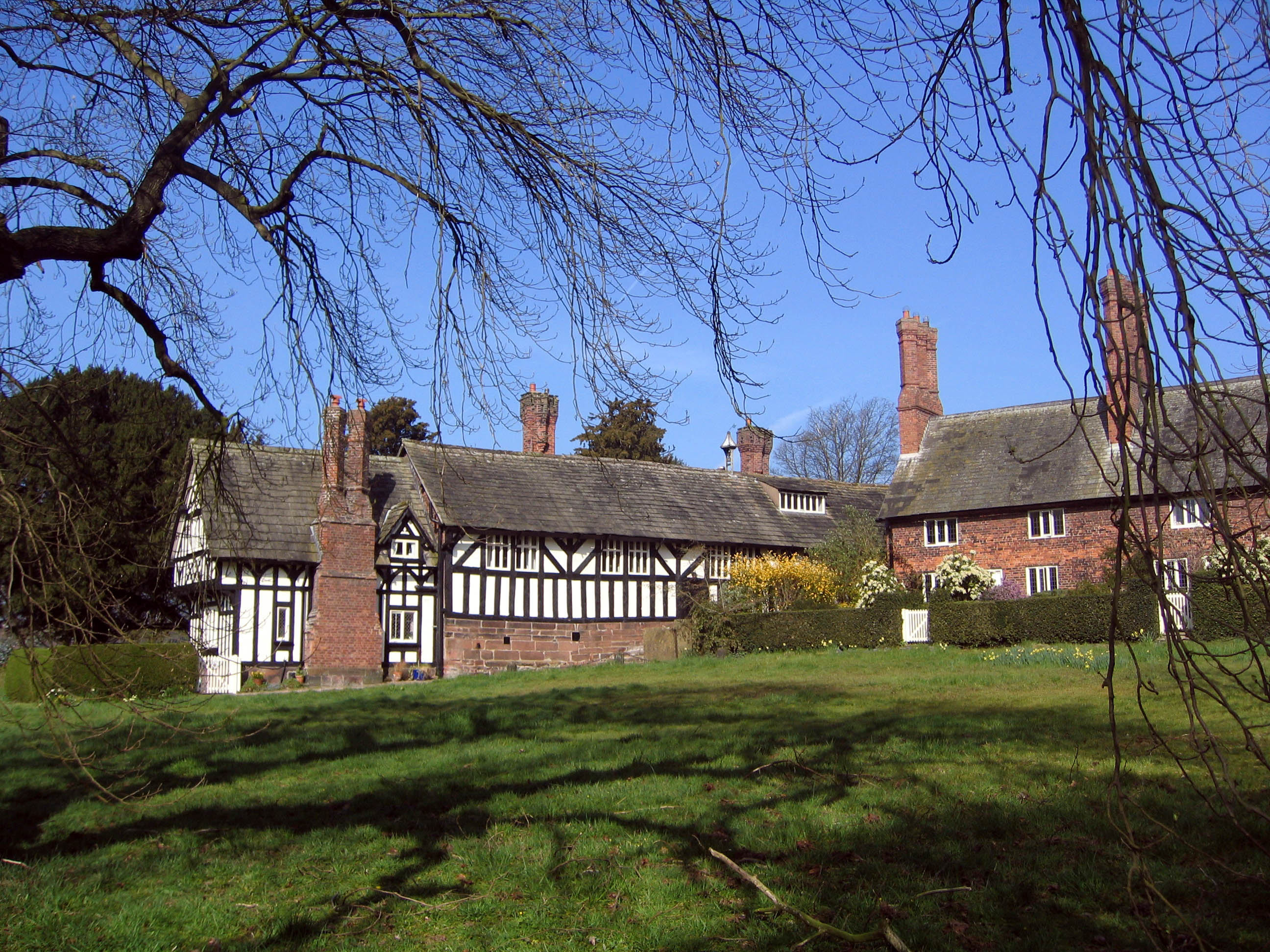
- Arley Green

- Location within Cheshire
- Population: 281 (2001)
- OS grid reference: SJ610957
- Civil parish: Aston by Budworth
- Unitary authority: Cheshire East
- Ceremonial county: Cheshire
- Region: North West
- Country: England
- Sovereign state: United Kingdom
- Post town: NORTHWICH
- Postcode district: CW9
- Dialling code: 01565
- Police: Cheshire
- Fire: Cheshire
- Ambulance: North West
- UK Parliament: Tatton

Aston by Budworth is a civil parish in the unitary authority of Cheshire East and the ceremonial county of Cheshire, England. The main villages in the parish are Arley, which is the site of Arley Hall, and Bate Heath. According to the 2001 census the parish had a population of 281.

== See also ==
- Listed buildings in Aston by Budworth
- Aston Park, Cheshire
