= Sessions House, Knutsford =

Municipal building in Knutsford, England

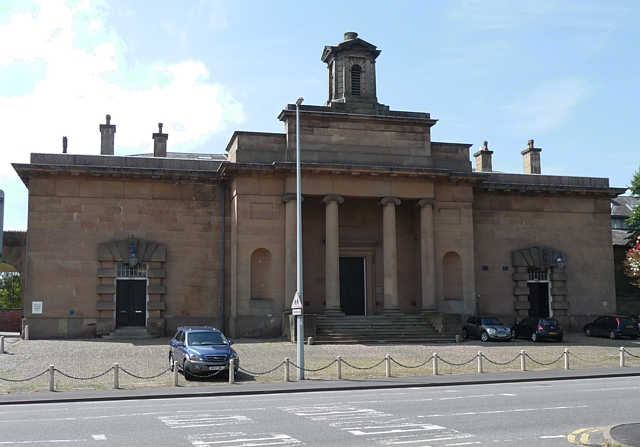
- Sessions House, Knutsford

- Shown in Cheshire
- 53.3023°N 2.3743°W
- Location: Toft Road, Knutsford

History
- Built: 1818

Site notes
- Architect: George Moneypenny
- Architectural style: Neoclassical style

Listed Building – Grade II*
- Official name: Sessions House
- Designated: 15 December 1954
- Reference no.: 1378501

The Sessions House is a judicial structure in Toft Road, Knutsford, Cheshire, England. The structure, which used to be the main courthouse for the eastern part of the county of Cheshire, is a Grade II* listed building.

== History ==
The first venue for the quarter sessions in Knutsford was an earlier courthouse in the Market Place where hearings were held from 1575. Hearings then moved to a building on the corner of Princess Street and Canute Square. (Note: The Old Sessions House later became a branch of Royal Bank of Scotland and then a Caffè Nero outlet.)

In the 18th century, the Midsummer and Michaelmas sessions were held in Nantwich and Northwich respectively but were transferred to Knutsford in around 1760 and 1784 respectively. Thereafter the Epiphany and Easter sessions were held in Chester and the Midsummer and Northwich sessions were held at Knutsford. The sessions hall in Nantwich had collapsed leading to the deaths of at least nine people and, in the early 19th century, it was agreed that the Knutsford sessions house should be replaced to avoid similar issues.

The new building was designed by George Moneypenny in the neoclassical style, built in ashlar stone and was completed in 1818. The design involved a symmetrical main frontage of five bays facing on Toft Road. The central section of three bays featured a tetrastyle portico formed by four Ionic order columns supporting an entablature, a cornice and a parapet. The portico was flanked by narrow bays contained niches, while the outer bays contained doorways (one door for the nisi prius judge and one door for the crown judge) with banded architraves and keystones. At roof level, there was a pedimented roof lantern. Internally, the principal rooms were the two courtrooms. Although the National Heritage List for England, published by Historic England, attributes the design to Moneypenny, the architectural historian, Nikolaus Pevsner, attributed the design to Thomas Harrison rather than Moneypenny.

A prison, designed by the same architect was erected behind the courthouse: it was extended, so that it could accommodate 700 inmates, in 1847. The prison closed in 1914 and was demolished in 1934.

Notable cases included the trial and conviction of the cryptographer, Alan Turing, in 1952, for gross indecency in relation to acts with a 19-year-old unemployed man, Arnold Murray, with whom he was in a consensual, private homosexual relationship. After public attitudes changed, Turing was pardoned in 2013.

Following the implementation of the Courts Act 1971, the former assizes courthouse was re-designated Knutsford Crown Court. The building continued to be used as a facility for dispensing justice but, in May 2010, magistrates court hearings were transferred to Chester and Warrington. The Ministry of Justice confirmed the closure of the building as a court on a permanent basis in 2014. The owners of Flat Cap Hotels, Oliver and Dominic Heywood, acquired the building in 2016 and converted it into a hotel, restaurant and bar. It opened in that capacity in 2018 and further extensive refurbishment was completed in early 2023.

== See also ==
- Grade II* listed buildings in Cheshire East
- Listed buildings in Knutsford
