= Aston Park, Cheshire =

Country house in Cheshire, England

Coordinates: 53.29905°N 2.48582°W

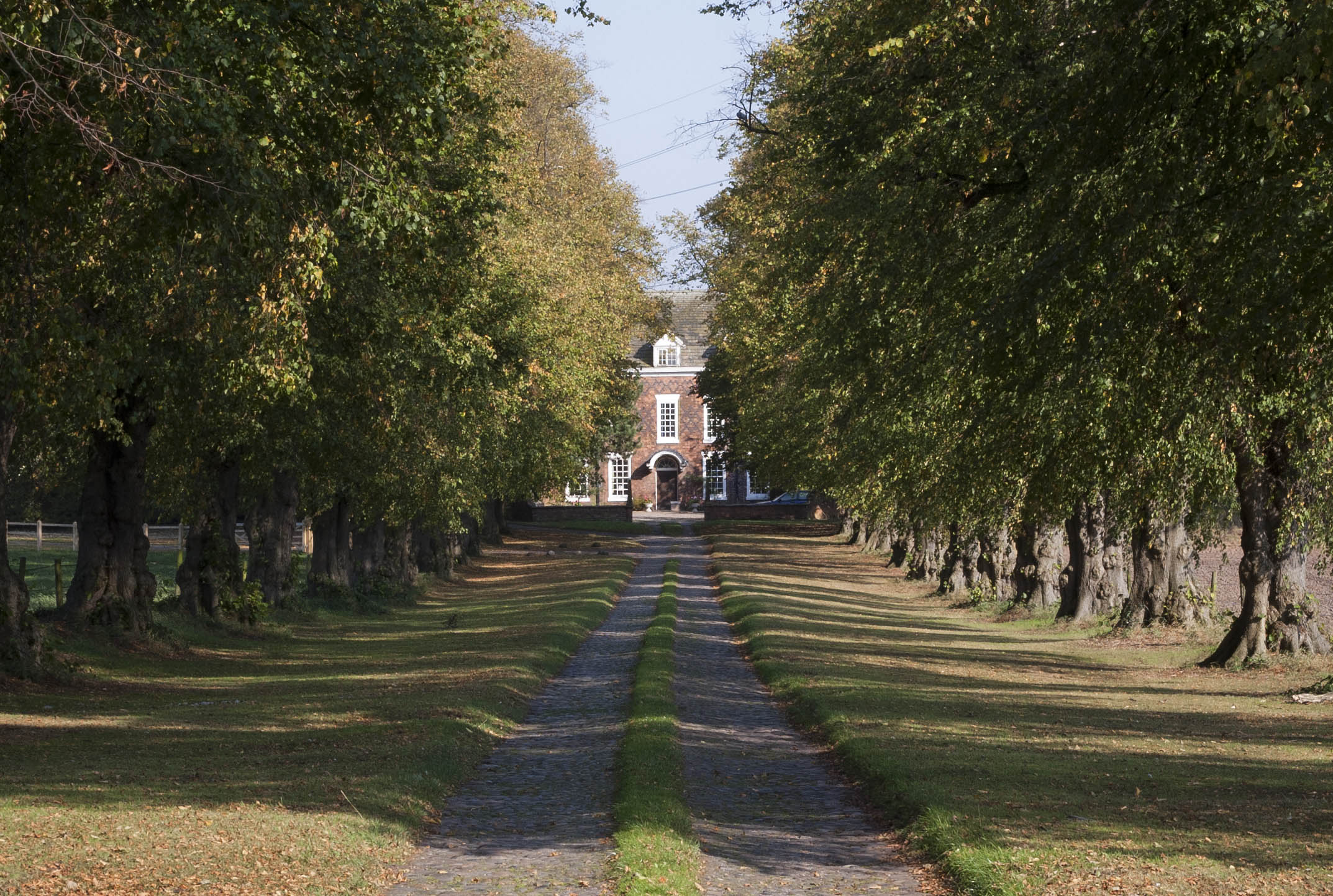
Aston Park viewed from Budworth Road

Aston Park is a Queen Anne country house in the parish of Aston by Budworth, Cheshire, England, built in 1715. The first mention of a building on the site is in the Domesday Book from 1086.

It is constructed in brick with stone dressings, and has a slate roof. The house has two storeys and an attic, and its front elevation is symmetrical with five bays. Its façade is decorated between the first floor windows with diapering in heart and diamond patterns. An extension was added to the right of the building during the 20th century. The house is recorded in the National Heritage List for England as a designated Grade II* listed building.

In 2018 the owner Laurence Daw was given a community order, together with a fine of £2,250 and costs of £65,000, for undertaking unlicensed redevelopment at the house which Cheshire East Council described as "reckless vandalism". Damage included demolishing a 19th-century servants' wing, a cheese room and an entrance for tradespeople, as well as replacing sash windows and other interior damage. The house subsequently required one of its walls to be stabilised.

== See also ==
- Grade II* listed buildings in Cheshire East
- Listed buildings in Aston by Budworth
