= Listed buildings in Great Warford =

Great Warford is a civil parish in Cheshire East, England. It contains six buildings that are recorded in the National Heritage List for England as designated listed buildings. Of these, one is listed at Grade II*, the middle grade, and the others are at Grade II. Apart from the village of Great Warford, the parish is almost entirely rural. The listed buildings consist of a house, a cottage, a farmhouse, a Chapel, the most spectacular is Highgrove built in 1903 as a Convalescent home for Ancoats Hospital in Manchester and its lodge after which the road is named.

== Key ==
Grade	Criteria
II*	Particularly important buildings of more than special interest
II	Buildings of national importance and special interest

== Buildings ==
Name and location	Photograph	Date	Notes	Grade
Baptist Chapel; 53.28984°N 2.27691°W		Mid-17th century	A pre-existing barn was converted into a chapel in 1712. In 1813 it was divided into two parts to provide a cottage for the minister, the other part continuing as a chapel. It is basically timber-framed, the front having been replaced in brick. The building has a six-bay front, the left three bays forming a two-storey cottage, and the rest being the chapel. Inside the chapel are box pews.	II*
Roadside Cottage; 53.30458°N 2.27561°W	—	Mid-17th century	The cottage is built in brick and has a thatched roof. It is in a single-storey with an attic. To the right of centre is a protruding porch. On the left of it is a bow window, and in the attic are dormers. The other windows are casements.	II
Manor Farmhouse; 53.29113°N 2.27737°W		Late 17th century	The farmhouse is timber-framed with brick and rendered brick infill on a stone plinth, and has a slate roof. On the front is an oriel window. All the windows are casements.	II
Dane Villa; 53.28989°N 2.26431°W	—	1781	A brick house with stone dressings and a stone slate roof. It is in two storeys, and has a front of three bays. The windows are casements.	II
Highgrove, Ancoats Hospital Convalescent Home; 53.29412°N 2.29316°W	—	1903	Highgrove was built as a convalescent home in 1903 for Ancoats Hospital in Manchester. It closed as a hospital in 1967, following a period operating as a nursing home was converted in apartments in 2001.The building is in brick with stone dressings, it has a slate roof, is in two storeys with an attic, and has a courtyard plan. The entrance front is symmetrical and in eleven bays. Above the central doorway is a sculpture of a mother and children under a floral canopy.	II
The Lodge, Highgrove, Ancoats Hospital Convalescent Home; 53.29391°N 2.29172°W		1904	The lodge to the hospital is in brick with a slate roof. To the right is an archway, and above it and to the left is the living accommodation. This contains casement windows, a doorway, and an oriel window.	II

== See also ==
- Listed buildings in Chorley
- Listed buildings in Little Warford
- Listed buildings in Marthall
- Listed buildings in Mobberley
- Listed buildings in Nether Alderley
