= White Lion, Barthomley =

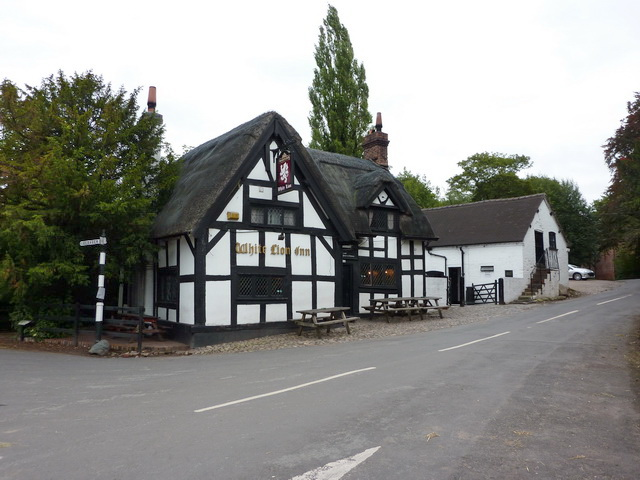

- Location in Cheshire
- 53.0686°N 2.3482°W
- Location: Audley Road, Barthomley, nr Crewe, Cheshire CW2 5PG

Listed Building – Grade II*
- Official name: The White Lion Inn
- Designated: 10 June 1952
- Reference no.: 1138700

The White Lion is a public house in Barthomley, Cheshire, England, just off junction 16 of the M6. It was built in 1614, and is recorded in the National Heritage List for England as a designated Grade II* listed building.

It is on the Campaign for Real Ale's National Inventory of Historic Pub Interiors. Its thatched roof was damaged by a fire in 2013, but it re-opened later that year. In September 2023, its lease expired and the pub was closed for repairs.

== See also ==
- Grade II* listed buildings in Cheshire East
- Listed buildings in Barthomley
