= Listed buildings in Aston by Budworth =

Aston by Budworth is a civil parish in Cheshire East, England. It contains 32 buildings that are recorded in the National Heritage List for England as designated listed buildings. Of these, one is listed at Grade I, the highest grade, three are listed at Grade II*, the middle grade, and the others are at Grade II. The major building in the parish is Arley Hall; this, together with a number of associated structures, is listed. Otherwise the parish is entirely rural, and the listed buildings are mainly houses, farmhouses, and farm buildings.

== Key ==
Grade	Criteria
I	Buildings of exceptional interest, sometimes considered to be internationally important
II*	Particularly important buildings of more than special interest
II	Buildings of national importance and special interest

== Buildings ==
Name and location	Photograph	Date	Notes	Grade
Cruck barn, Arley Hall; 53.32412°N 2.49010°W		15th century	The former barn is timber-framed on a stone plinth with a slate roof. It is in a single storey and has a front of six bays, the bay on the right containing a through carriageway. The other bays are divided into three stages, the bottom stage having brick infill, the middle stage with clapboard, and the top stage being open. Above the carriageway is a timber-framed gable, and on the roof is a three-stage timber clock turret. This was designed by Anthony Salvin; it has clock faces in the middle stage and a top stage containing a bell, which is surmounted by a saddleback roof. Inside the barn are seven full-cruck trusses.	I
Arley Green School and Arley Green Lodge; 53.32339°N 2.47959°W		Early 16th century	Originating as a barn, the building was converted into a school in about 1830. It is timber-framed on a stone plinth and has rendered brick infill and a stone-slate roof. It is in a single storey, and contains mullioned and transomed windows and one dormer. The attached cottage is also timber-framed, and has a gabled dormer and a bay window. Inside are four full crucks.	II
The Ashes Farmhouse; 53.32434°N 2.47088°W	—	Late 16th to early 17th century	The former farmhouse is timber-framed on a stone plinth with brick infill and a slate roof. It is in two storeys, and a former 18th-century wash house has been joined to form an extension. The windows are casements. There is a full cruck in the right gable end, and a further three full crucks inside the building.	II
Tudor barn, Arley Hall; 53.32440°N 2.49002°W		1604	Originally a barn, this has been converted into a restaurant. It is built in brick on a stone plinth with stone dressings and a slate roof. Formerly in two storeys, most of it has been altered to form a single storey. The windows are casements, and the other features include doorways, French windows, a hay loft door, ventilation holes in various patterns, and dormer ventilation grilles in the roof.	II
The Ashes Cottage and farmhouse 53.32449°N 2.47063°W	—	Mid-17th century	This originated as a range of farm buildings that have been converted into a farmhouse, stables and cottage. They are partly in timber framing with brick infill on a stone plinth, and partly in brick. The roofs are slated. The stables date from the 18th century, and have joined the 17th-century farmhouse and cottage to make a single building.	II
Feldy Green; 53.31338°N 2.45793°W	—	Mid-17th century	A former farmhouse, the original building is timber-framed with rendered infill on a stone and brick plinth. A wing was added to the right in the late 17th century, and a brick gabled wing was added to the rear in the 20th century. The roofs are tiled, and the windows are casements.	II
Garland Hall Farm; 53.32689°N 2.50269°W	—	Mid-17th century	Originally a farmhouse, it was altered and extended in the early 18th century. It is built in brick with stone dressings, and has a roof of slate and stone-slate. The house is in two storeys with an attic, and has a symmetrical three-bay front. It has a central doorway, and mullioned windows containing casements. On each side are lean-to extensions.	II
Hawthorn Cottage	—	Mid-17th century	This building originated as a barn that was converted into two cottages, and later into one house. It is built partly in brick, and partly in timber framing with rendered infill and a slate roof. The house is in two storeys, and has an entrance front of four bays. The windows are casements, and there is a 20th-century porch to the left of centre.	II
Litley Farmhouse; 53.32204°N 2.46420°W	—	Mid-17th century	The farmhouse is timber-framed on a stone plinth with rendered infill and a slate roof. It is in two storeys with an entrance front of three bays. A wing was added to the right in the 19th century. The windows are casements, and in the 19th-century wing is a three-light dormer.	II
Farm building, The Firs; 53.33166°N 2.48957°W	—	Late 17th century	A farm building in two storeys, the shippon being on the ground floor and a loft above. It is timber-framed on a stone plinth with brick infill and a slate roof. In the centre is a gabled loft door.	II
Mill House; 53.32253°N 2.46966°W	—	Late 17th century	The house is timber-framed on a deep brick plinth with brick infill and a slate roof. It is in two storeys, and the windows are casements.	II
Towngate Cottage; 53.30792°N 2.45765°W	—	Late 17th century	A timber-framed cottage on a brick and stone plinth with brick infill and a slate roof. It was originally in a single storey, and later converted into two storeys. The gabled porch projects forwards to the right of centre, and the windows are casements. During the 29th century a kitchen extension was added to the right, and a dormer to the left.	II
Crowley Hall; 53.33601°N 2.48774°W	—	1677	A farmhouse that was restored in 1885. It is built in brick and stone on a stone plinth, and has a stone-slate roof. The house is in two storeys, and there is a projecting gabled wing to the right. There is a porch to the left of centre, and the windows are casements.	II
Aston Park; 53.29905°N 2.48582°W		1715	A brick country house with stone dressings and a slate roof, it is in two storeys with an attic, an has a symmetrical front of five bays. There is a central arched doorway, and decorative diapering between the upper floor windows. In the attic are three gables. Almost all the windows are sashes.	II*
Old Parsonage; 53.32351°N 2.47863°W	—	c. 1750	A brick house with stone dressings and a slate roof, it is in two storeys with an attic. It has a symmetrical entrance front of three bays. The central doorcase has pilasters, an open pediment, and a fanlight. At the top of this front is a pediment with a wooden frieze and cornice containing a triangular-headed window. The rear of the house is also symmetrical, with a central doorway flanked by half-Ionic columns supporting an entablature and pediment. Five stone steps lead up to this doorway.	II
Walls and gate piers, Crowley Lodge; 53.32248°N 2.51136°W	—	Mid-18th century	The garden walls and gate piers are in buff and red sandstone. The wall is plain, and the gate piers are square and rusticated. At the top of each is a cornice and a fluted urn.	II
Gore Farmhouse; 53.31638°N 2.45625°W	—	Mid-18th century	A brick farmhouse with a slate roof, it is in two storeys with an attic, and has a symmetrical entrance front of three bays. There is a central doorway with a fanlight, and the windows are casements. A service wing was added to the rear in the 19th century.	II
Eastern walled garden, Arley Hall; 53.32367°N 2.49004°W		18th century	A brick wall with stone copings about 12 feet (3.7 m) to 13 feet (4.0 m) high surrounds the four sides of the garden. There are pointed archways in the east and west walls. In the southwest corner is a triangular outhouse.	II
Pinfold; 53.30927°N 2.47210°W		18th century	The pinfold consists of a rectangular stone enclosure with walls about 3 feet 6 inches (1.1 m) high. The entrance is on the eastern side.	II
Western walled garden, Arley Hall; 53.32424°N 2.49135°W		18th century	A brick wall with stone copings about 12 feet (3.7 m) to 13 feet (4.0 m) high surrounds the four sides of the garden. In the south wall are 19th-century gate piers with stone caps and ball and spike finials. The east wall is buttressed and has a pointed archway. In the west wall are two openings, one with a pointed arch, the other with a stone lintel.	II
Sundial, Arley Hall; 53.32402°N 2.48857°W		18th century	The sundial stands in the centre of the south forecourt of the hall. It consists of a stone base with a figure in lead depicting a Native American supporting a dial on his head. The dial consist of a contemporary plate and a 20th-century gnomon.	II
King's Cottage, Chaplain's House, School House and Oak Lodge; 53.32352°N 2.47930°W		Late 18th century	Originating as shippons, the building was converted into four cottages in the middle of the 19th century. They are built in brick with slate roofs. The three left-hand cottages form a symmetrical front with three bays and a central doorway to each cottage. The windows are casements. The right-hand cottage has a four-light oriel window on its gabled right side.	II
Arley Hall; 53.3243°N 2.4886°W		1832–45	Arley Hall is a country house designed by George Latham for Rowland Egerton-Warburton in Jacobethan style, built to replace an earlier house on the site. It is constructed in red brick with blue brick diapering, stone dressings, and a slate roof. The house has an L-shaped plan, is in two storeys with a cellar and attic, and has a symmetrical seven-bay south front. The outer bays project forward and have canted bay windows, the central bay contains a protruding porch, and at the top of the building is a pierced parapet.	II*
New Farmhouse; 53.31101°N 2.47160°W		Early to mid-19th century	A brick farmhouse with a slate roof, it is in two storeys with an attic, and has a symmetrical three-bay front. The central bay projects slightly forward, has a recessed arched porch, and a pediment containing a round window. The other windows are casements.	II
St Mary's Chapel, Arley Hall; 53.3246°N 2.4886°W		1845	This is the private chapel to the hall, designed by Anthony Salvin for Rowland Egerton-Warburton in Gothic Revival style. In 1856–57 a north aisle and entrance porch designed by G. E. Street were added. The chapel is constructed in sandstone and rendered brick, with roofs of slate and tiles, and consists of a nave, a north aisle, a south porch, a chancel, and an octagonal bellcote.	II*
Balustrade, Arley Hall; 53.32443°N 2.48746°W		c. 1850	Designed by George Latham, the balustrade surrounds three sides of what was originally a formal garden to the east of the hall. It is built in brick and stone, and incorporates piers with sunken panels.	II
Forcing house, Arley Hall; 53.32391°N 2.49039°W		c. 1850	This is a long building running east–west, with a greenhouse on the south side, and a boiler house and outbuildings on the north side. It is built in brick and glass, with a timber lean-to roof. On the north side are mullioned windows.	II
Forecourt walls and gate piers, Arley Hall; 53.32383°N 2.48861°W		c. 1850	The walls surround three sides of the south forecourt, and extend south to form the parapet of a bridge over the ha-ha. They are in red brick with blue brick diapering and have a stone base and coping. The gate piers are in stone. The piers in the east and west walls are rusticated with ball and spike finials. Those in the south wall have panels and lozenges, and their former elaborate finials have been reduced.	II
Horse Shoe Cottage; 53.32428°N 2.49571°W		c. 1850s	A brick estate cottage with a slate roof in a single storey. It has a doorway to the left of centre. To the left of the doorway is a four-light window, and to the right are a two-light and a three-light window; all are mullioned and have round heads.	II
Garden seat, Arley Hall; 53.32333°N 2.49166°W		c. 1860	This consists of an enclosure containing a recess, built in stone and brick with partial rendering, standing at the west end of the herbaceous borders in Arley Hall Gardens. It has a central basket arch with a keystone carved with a satyr's head. On each side are pilasters, and above the arch are an entablature with a frieze and a cornice. On the top are ball finials.	II
Aesop's Cottages; 53.32422°N 2.49531°W		Late 19th century	A row of three estate cottages. They are built in red brick with some blue brick diapering and stone dressings. The cottages are in two storeys, and have casement windows. There is timber-framing with pargetted infill in the gables.	II
Telephone kiosk 53.32423°N 2.49560°W		1935	A K6 type telephone kiosk, designed by Giles Gilbert Scott. Constructed in cast iron with a square plan and a dome, it has three unperforated crowns in the top panels.	II

== See also ==
- Listed buildings in Antrobus
- Listed buildings in Great Budworth
- Listed buildings in High Legh
- Listed buildings in Marston
- Listed buildings in Mere
- Listed buildings in Pickmere
- Listed buildings in Tabley Superior
