= Bexton Hall =

Coordinates: 53.28902°N 2.38000°W

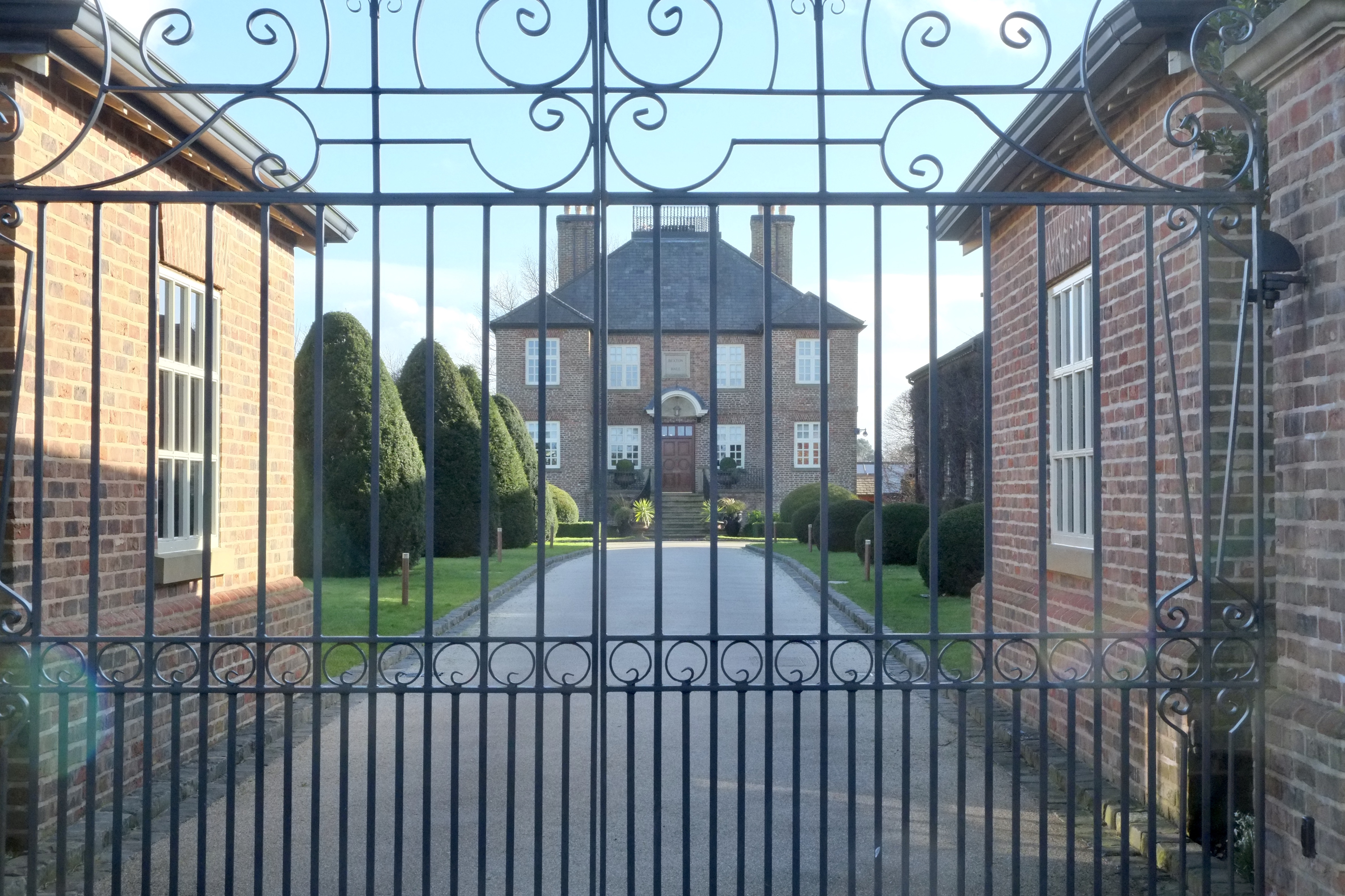
- Bexton Hall

- Location within Cheshire
- Location: Bexton, Cheshire

Listed Building – Grade II*
- Official name: Bexton Hall
- Designated: 5 March 1959
- Reference no.: 1115558

Bexton Hall is a country house in the village of Bexton to the southwest of Knutsford, Cheshire, England. It is a square, symmetrical house of five bays, dating from the late 17th century. It is constructed in brick, with slate roofs, and has two storeys plus a basement. The house is recorded in the National Heritage List for England as a designated Grade II* listed building, and is the only listed building in Bexton parish. The forecourt walls are included in the listing. The house originally had a cupola, but this is no longer present.

== See also ==
- Grade II* listed buildings in Cheshire East
