= Hassall Hall =

Manor house in Cheshire, England

Coordinates: 53.11254°N 2.34391°W

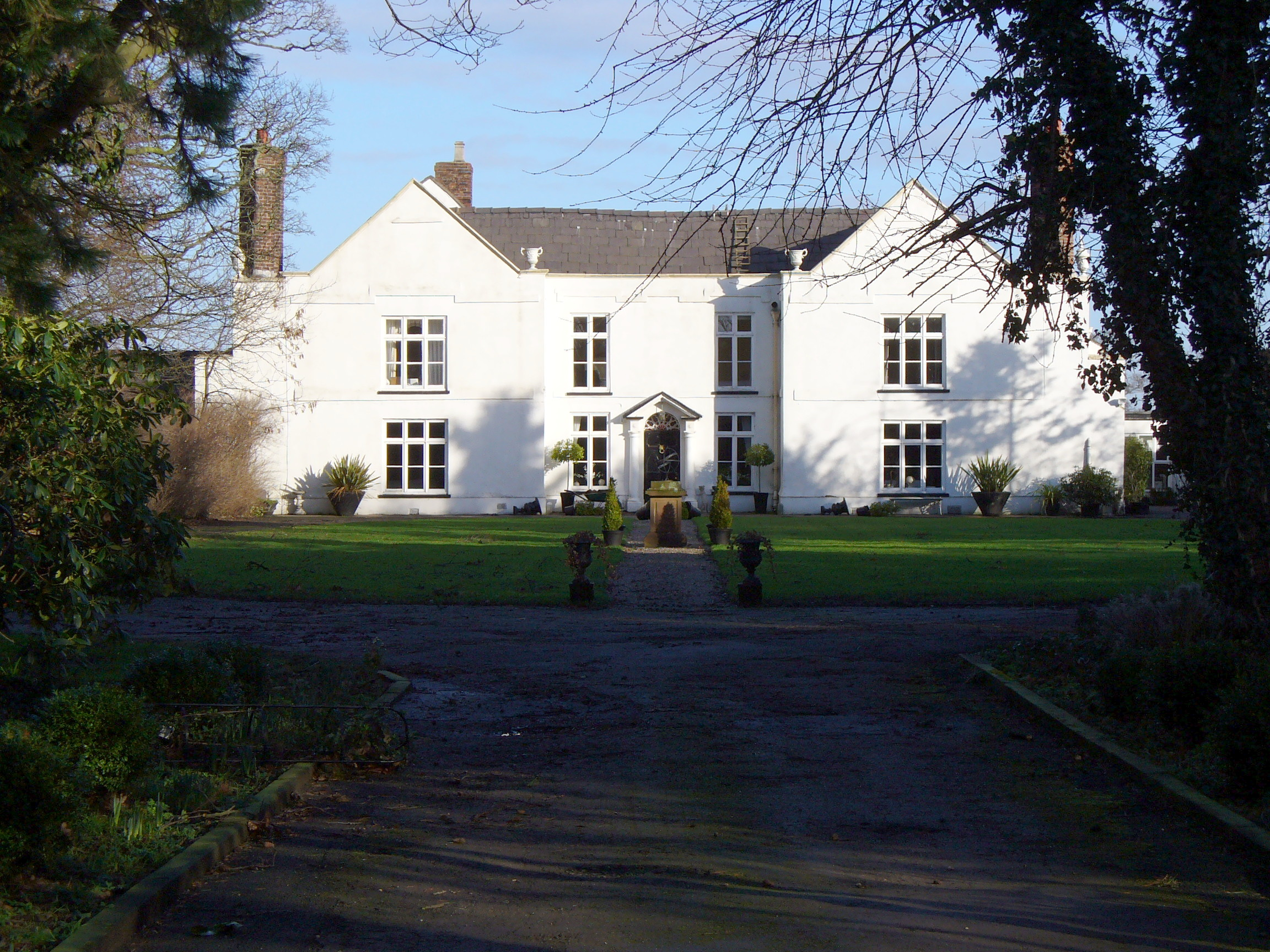
Hassall Hall

Hassall Hall is a former manor house to the east of the village of Hassall, Cheshire, England. The house dates from the 17th century, and was re-fronted in the 19th century. It has since been divided into two houses. It is constructed in rendered brick and has a slate roof. The house has an H-plan. The entrance front is symmetrical, in two storeys, with five bays. The central three bays are recessed and the middle bay contains a doorway. The doorway is flanked by Tuscan pillars, and above the door is an open pediment enclosing a fanlight. The houses are recorded in the National Heritage List for England as a designated Grade II* listed building.

== See also ==
- Grade II* listed buildings in Cheshire East
- Listed buildings in Hassall
