= All Saints Chapel, Somerford =

Coordinates: 53.1804°N 2.2786°W

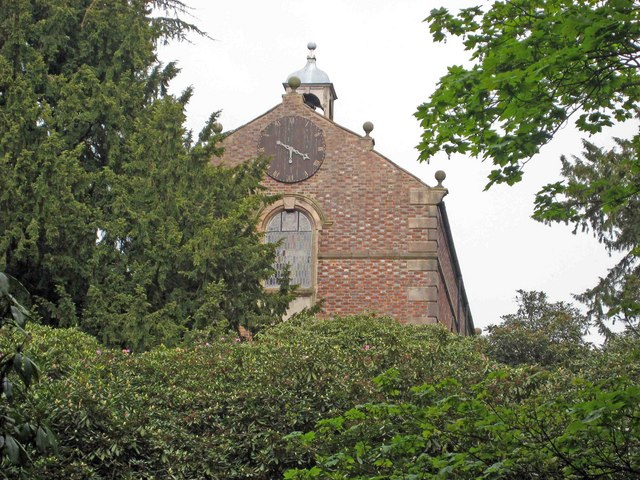
- All Saints Chapel, Somerford, west face

- Location in Cheshire
- OS grid reference: SJ 815 648
- Location: Somerford, near Brereton Heath, Cheshire
- Country: England
- Denomination: Anglican
- Website: All Saints, Somerford

History
- Status: Chapel of ease
- Dedication: All Saints

Architecture
- Heritage designation: Grade II*
- Designated: 14 February 1967
- Architectural type: Chapel
- Completed: 1725

Specifications
- Materials: Chequer brick

Administration
- Province: York
- Diocese: Chester
- Archdeaconry: Macclesfield
- Deanery: Congleton
- Parish: Astbury and Smallwood

Clergy
- Rector: The Revd Anne-Marie Naylor

All Saints Chapel, Somerford is in an isolated position near the hamlet of Brereton Heath, between Congleton and Holmes Chapel, Cheshire, England. It is recorded in the National Heritage List for England as a designated Grade II* listed building. The chapel is in the Anglican benefice of Astbury and Smallwood in the deanery of Congleton, the archdeaconry of Macclesfield and the diocese of Chester.

== History ==
It was built in 1725 as a domestic chapel to Somerford Hall by Peter Shackerley. Since 1943 it has been a chapel of ease. The hall, other than one wing and the stables, has been demolished.

== Architecture ==
The chapel is built in chequer brick in four bays. All the corners have chamfered quoins. On the west face is a central doorway above which is a rectangular datestone. Above this is a round-arched window and a clock face. On the summit of the gable are ball finials. The eastern face has a three-light window above which is an oval oeil de boeuf window and finials similar to those on the west face. The north and south faces have four round-arched windows with ashlar surrounds.

Internally the lower parts of the walls are panelled. On top of the panels is a 19th-century frieze and cornice. At the western end of the chapel is a gallery which is supported by Corinthian columns and on the left of the gallery is an enclosed pew. At the eastern end of the chapel is a reredos with three painted panels. The left panel has an extract from St Matthew's Gospel and the right panel has the Creed. The central panel is overlaid by a 20th-century panel of embroidery. The east window was replaced in 1919 with a memorial window to three members of the Shakerley family who died in the First World War. On the north side of the altar is a 17th-century memorial to Elizabeth Shakerley who died in 1691.

== External features ==
In the churchyard is the grave of Peter Shakerley, founder of the chapel, who died in 1726.

== See also ==
- Grade II* listed buildings in Cheshire East
