= Swineyard Hall =

Country house in High Legh, Cheshire, England

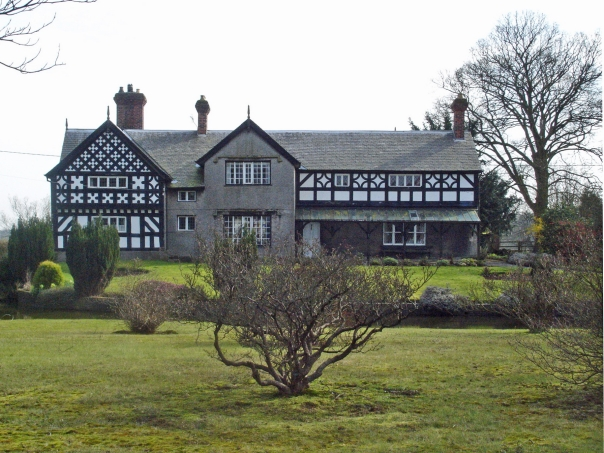
- Swineyard Hall

- Location within England
- Alternative names: Swineyard Hall Farmhouse

General information
- Location: High Legh, Cheshire, England, Swineyard Lane, High Legh, WA16 0RY
- Coordinates: 53°21′01″N 2°29′07″W
- Completed: 16th century

Technical details
- Structural system: Timber framing, stone, brick

Swineyard Hall is a moated country house in the parish of High Legh, Cheshire, England. It was built in the 16th century, with additions made in the 19th century, and is still partly moated.The house is constructed partly in timber framing with rendered brick infill, and partly in stone on a brick plinth. The house has two storeys and an H-shaped plan. The left-hand wing of the entrance front is timber-framed and includes close studding. The house is recorded in the National Heritage List for England as a designated Grade II* listed building. The moated site on which the house stands is a Scheduled Monument.

== See also ==
- Grade II* listed buildings in Cheshire East
