= Listed buildings in Hassall =

Hassall is a civil parish in Cheshire East, England. It contains two buildings that are recorded in the National Heritage List for England as designated listed buildings. Of these, one is listed at Grade II*, the middle grade, and the other is at Grade II. The parish is almost entirely rural, and the Trent and Mersey Canal runs through it. The listed buildings consist of a former manor house and a bridge over the canal.

== Key ==
| Grade | Criteria |
|---|---|
| II* | Particularly important buildings of more than special interest |
| II | Buildings of national importance and special interest |

== Buildings ==
| Name and location | Photograph | Date | Notes | Grade |
|---|---|---|---|---|
| Hassall Hall and Hassall Hall Farmhouse; 53.11251°N 2.34393°W | | Late 17th century | Originating as a manor house, this was later converted into two houses. The building is in rendered brick with a slate roof. It has an H-plan, is in two storeys, and has a symmetrical entrance front of five bays. There is a central doorway with Tuscan pillars, a fanlight and an open fanlight. The windows are a mix of sashes and casements. | II* |
| Malkin's Bank Bridge; 53.12916°N 2.35603°W | | 1772–75 | This is bridge number 151 of the Trent and Mersey Canal, which carries a road over it. The canal and its bridges were designed by James Brindley and Hugh Henshall. A north span was added in the 1830s when lock number 63 was doubled, possibly by Thomas Telford. The bridge is in brick with stone dressings, and has two arches. | II |

== See also ==
- Listed buildings in Alsager
- Listed buildings in Betchton
- Listed buildings in Haslington
- Listed buildings in Sandbach
