= Somerford, Cheshire =

Civil parish in Cheshire, England

Coordinates: 53.166°N 2.266°W

Somerford
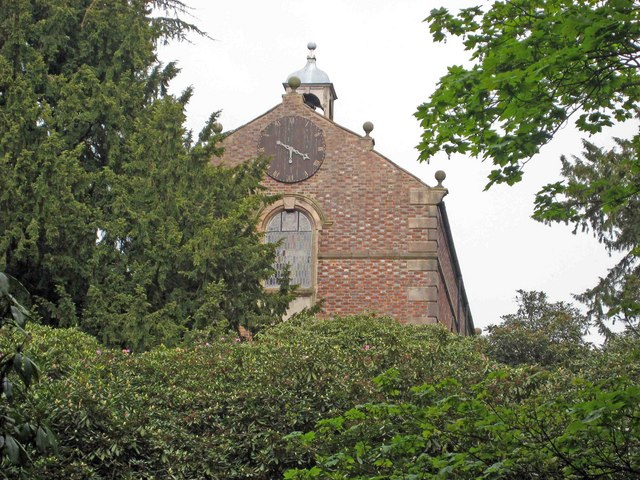
- All Saints Chapel, Somerford

- Location within Cheshire
- Population: 430 (2011)
- OS grid reference: SJ821633
- Civil parish: Somerford
- Unitary authority: Cheshire East
- Ceremonial county: Cheshire
- Region: North West
- Country: England
- Sovereign state: United Kingdom
- Post town: CONGLETON
- Postcode district: CW12
- Dialling code: 01260
- Police: Cheshire
- Fire: Cheshire
- Ambulance: North West
- UK Parliament: Congleton

Somerford is a civil parish in the unitary authority of Cheshire East and the ceremonial county of Cheshire, England. It is adjacent to the north west of Congleton, from which town it has some housing overflow. According to the 2001 census, the population of the civil parish was 343, increasing to 430 at the 2011 Census.

Somerford Park was the site of a Georgian country house demolished in 1926. The park has now been restored to farming and an equestrian centre. All Saints Chapel was built in 1720 as a chapel to Somerford Hall. It still stands and is listed at grade II*.
