= Bexton =

Civil parish in Cheshire, England

Coordinates: 53.288°N 2.389°W

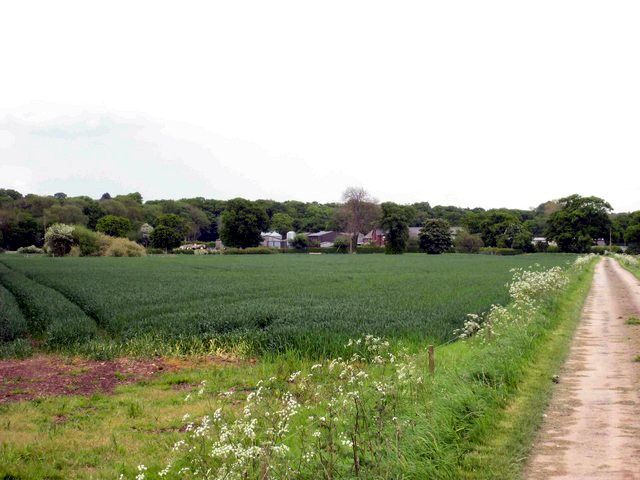
- Ullardhall Farm, Bexton

- Location within Cheshire
- Population: 9 (2001)
- OS grid reference: SJ740768
- Civil parish: Plumley with Toft and Bexton
- Unitary authority: Cheshire East
- Ceremonial county: Cheshire
- Region: North West
- Country: England
- Sovereign state: United Kingdom
- Post town: KNUTSFORD
- Postcode district: WA16
- Dialling code: 01565
- Police: Cheshire
- Fire: Cheshire
- Ambulance: North West
- UK Parliament: Tatton

Bexton is a civil parish to the south west of Knutsford, in the unitary authority of Cheshire East, England. According to the 2001 census it had a population of 9. At the 2011 Census the population remained minimal, and details are included in the civil parish of Peover Inferior.

Bexton Hall is designated by English Heritage as a Grade II* listed building, and is the only listed building in the parish.
