= Arley, Cheshire =

Village in Cheshire, England

Coordinates: 53.324°N 2.496°W

Arley
- Civil parish: Aston by Budworth
- Region: North West
- Country: England
- Sovereign state: United Kingdom
- Ambulance: North West

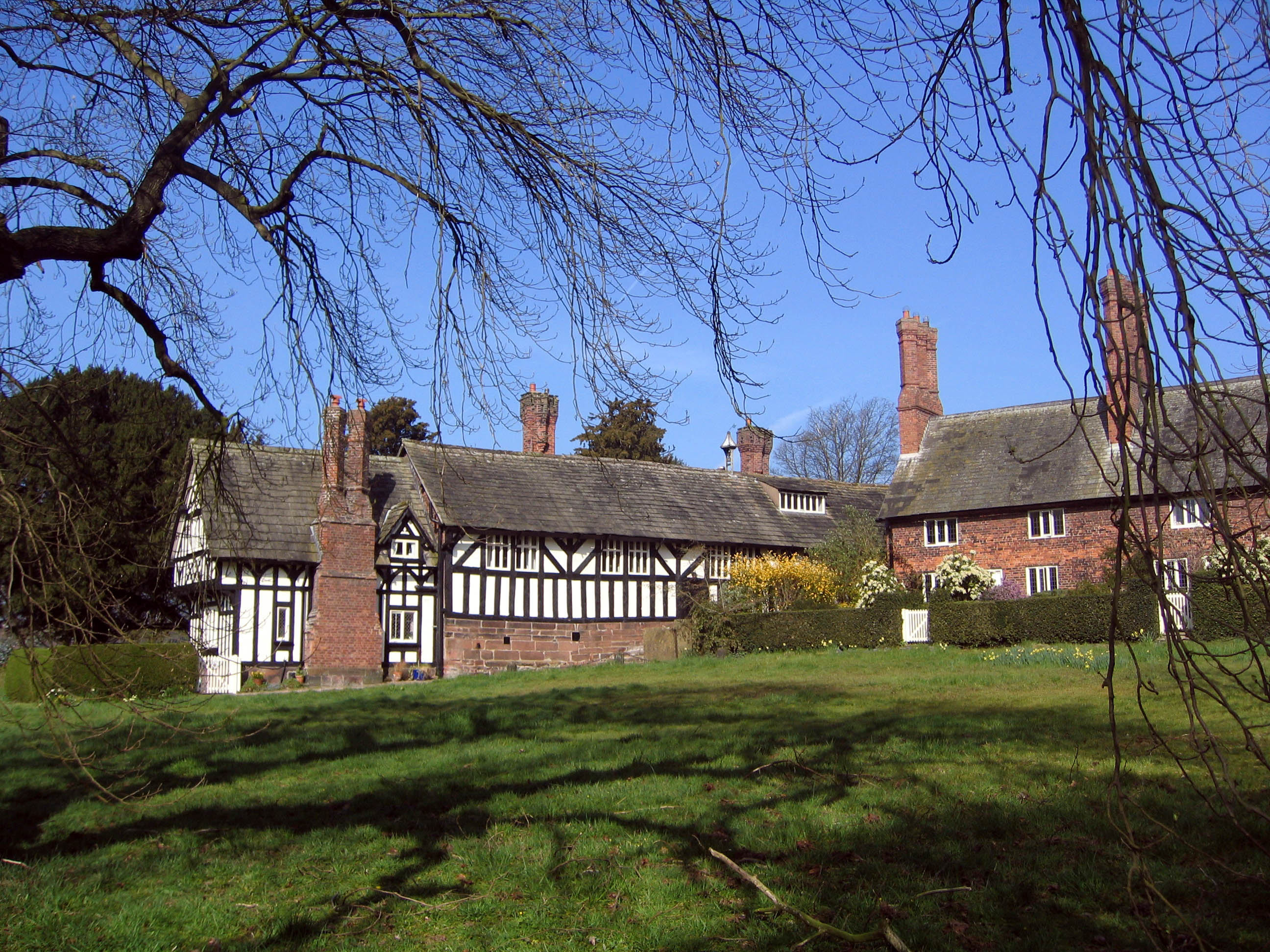
Arley Green

Arley is a small village in the civil parish of Aston by Budworth, Cheshire, England, adjacent to Arley Hall. 0.7 miles (1.1 km) to the east is a small group of houses known as Arley Green. The village is 3.8 miles (6.1 km) south of Lymm and 5 miles (8.0 km) north of Northwich.

The buildings now comprising Arley Green originally formed Cowhouse Farm. Rowland Egerton-Warburton converted the half-timbered barn into a school and adapted another 18th-century building into a terrace of Tudor-style buildings. The farmhouse was converted into a parsonage.
