= Hassall =

Village in Cheshire, England

Coordinates: 53.114°N 2.354°W

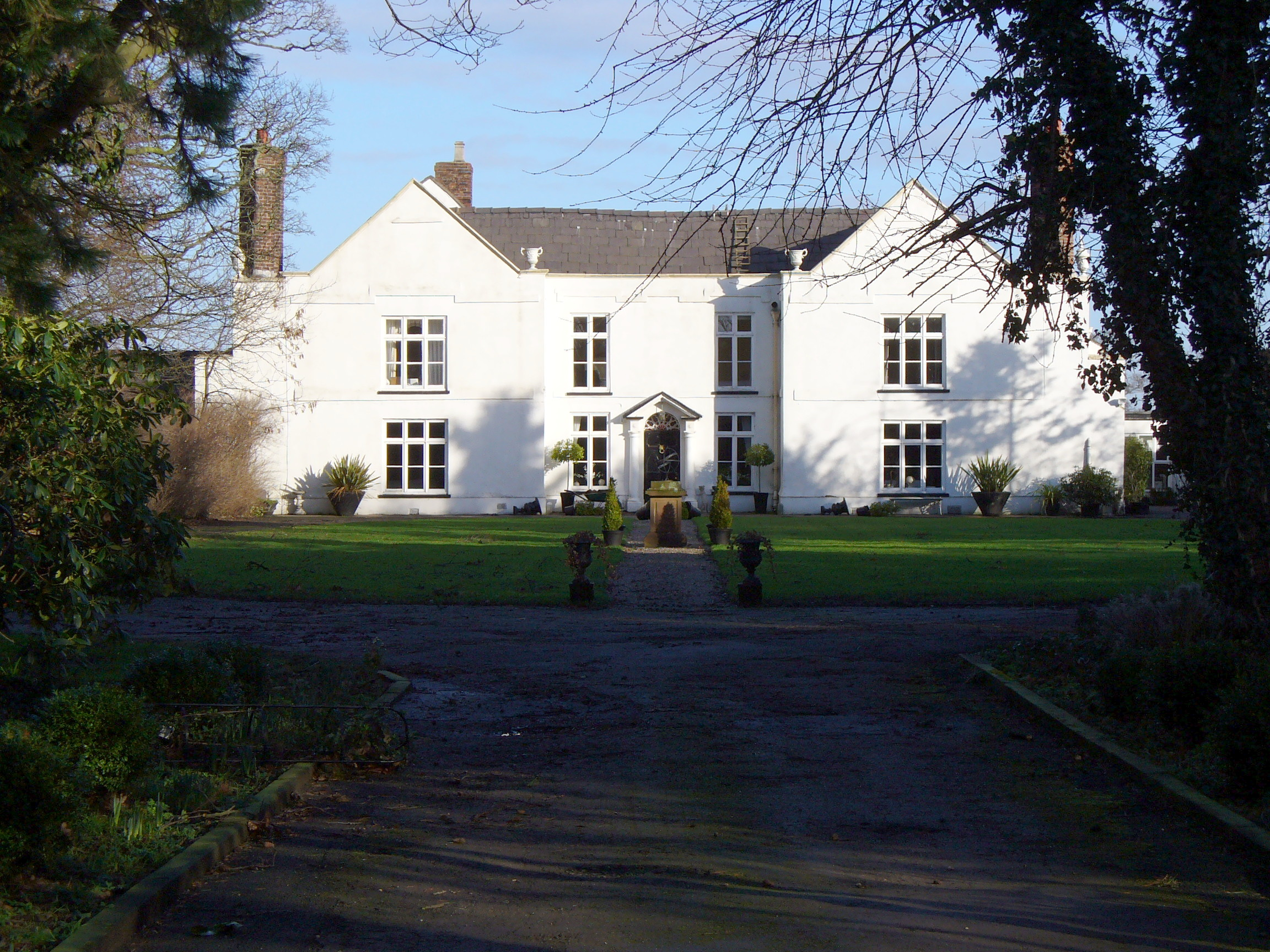
- Hassall Hall

- Location within Cheshire
- Population: 265 (2011)
- OS grid reference: SJ764575
- Civil parish: Hassall
- Unitary authority: Cheshire East
- Ceremonial county: Cheshire
- Region: North West
- Country: England
- Sovereign state: United Kingdom
- Post town: SANDBACH
- Postcode district: CW11
- Dialling code: 01270
- Police: Cheshire
- Fire: Cheshire
- Ambulance: North West
- UK Parliament: Congleton

Hassall is a village and civil parish in the Borough of Cheshire East and the ceremonial county of Cheshire, England. The civil parish contains the very small hamlet of Day Green. According to the 2001 United Kingdom census, the population was 281, reducing to 265 at the 2011 Census.

== See also ==
- Listed buildings in Hassall
- Hassall Hall
