= Arley Hall =

Country house in Cheshire, England

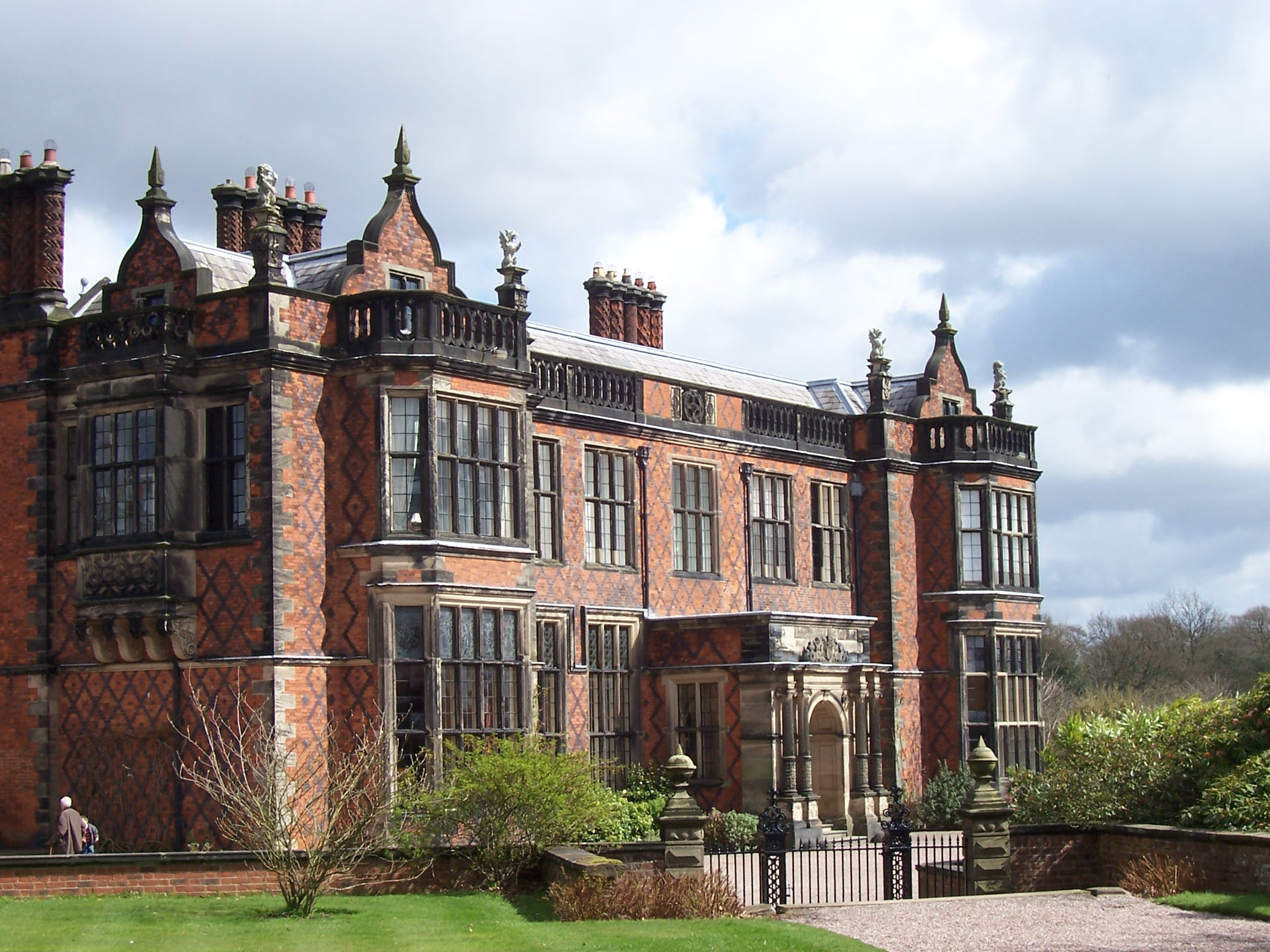
- South front

- Location in Cheshire
- 53.3243°N 2.4886°W
- Location: Arley, Cheshire, England
- OS grid reference: SJ 675 810

History
- Built: 1832–45
- Built for: Rowland Egerton-Warburton

Site notes
- Architect(s): George Latham (hall); Anthony Salvin (chapel)
- Architectural style: Jacobethan
- Restored: 1968, 1987
- Owner: Viscount Ashbrook

Listed Building – Grade II*
- Designated: 5 March 1959
- Reference no.: 1329694

Arley Hall is a country house in the village of Arley, Cheshire, England, about 4 miles (6 km) south of Lymm and 5 miles (8 km) north of Northwich. It is home to the owner, Viscount Ashbrook, and his family. The house is a Grade II* listed building, as is its adjacent chapel. Formal gardens to the southwest of the hall are also listed as Grade II* on the National Register of Historic Parks and Gardens. In the grounds are more listed buildings, a cruck barn being listed as Grade I, and the other buildings as Grade II.

The hall was built for Rowland Egerton-Warburton between 1832 and 1845, to replace an earlier house on the site. Local architect George Latham designed the house in a style which has become known as Jacobethan, copying elements of Elizabethan architecture. A Gothic Revival chapel designed by Anthony Salvin was subsequently built next to the hall. By the mid-20th century, parts of the house were in poor condition and were demolished, to be replaced by five private homes in a matching architectural style.

The present gardens were created in the 1830s, and were developed during the 20th century. The garden's herbaceous border was the first of its type in England. The house and its gardens have been open to the public since the 1960s, and have also been used as a film location. Stockley Farm, part of the Arley estate, is an additional visitor attraction for children and families.

== Hall ==
=== History ===
The Arley estate has been part of the land held by the Warburton family since the end of the 12th century. In 1469 Piers Warburton moved his principal seat from Warburton in Trafford, to Arley, and built the first house on the site. It consisted of a U-shaped building with the centre of the 'U' facing south. At the north was the great hall, 45 feet (14 m) long by 26 feet (7.9 m) wide. The high table was at the west end and the west wing contained the family apartments. The east wing was the servants' wing and included the buttery, pantry and kitchens. The original Arley Hall was constructed as a timber-framed building, and was surrounded by a square moat. A three-storey south front was added in about 1570, making the house a complete square with a large internal courtyard. In the 18th century the structure of the house was deteriorating, so in 1758 Sir Peter Warburton, 4th Baronet, completely encased the building in new brick walls. These were finished with stucco to make Neoclassical façades. The massive old chimneys were removed and replaced with small flues within the new walls. Between 1760 and 1763 Elizabeth Raffald, author of one of the century's most successful cookery books, The Experienced English Housekeeper, worked as the housekeeper at Arley.

Structural problems continued. In 1813 the house and estate were inherited by Rowland Egerton-Warburton, who was only aged eight. In 1818 plans were drawn up by Lewis Wyatt to rebuild the west front in Neoclassical style, but these were not implemented. Egerton-Warburton came of age (21) in 1826 and decided to completely replace the house. His intention was that the house should reflect the antiquity of his inheritance, but that it should be constructed using techniques which were modern at the time. He chose George Latham as his architect. Latham, who was practising in Nantwich, was at that time in his twenties and was relatively unknown. He submitted four schemes for a symmetrical Gothic house, but these were not accepted. Then Latham prepared new plans which he called "Queen Elizabethan". He suggested that this could be built for about £5,000–6,000. Every feature in the house had to have an exact model in an existing Elizabethan building. Egerton-Warburton and Latham visited 16th-century houses and studied illustrations to ensure that the features were dated correctly to Queen Elizabeth's reign. The first phase of the building took place between 1832 and 1835 when the east, north and west wings of the old building were demolished. The house was equipped with modern plumbing and it was raised on arches above the damp Cheshire clays. The second phase of building work, carried out between 1840 and 1845, replaced the old south front. The final cost of the house was almost £30,000 (equivalent to £3,150,000 in 2025).

In the 20th century Elizabeth Egerton-Warburton inherited the estate. She married Desmond Flower, who became the 10th Viscount Ashbrook, in 1934. Later in the century, parts of the south front were affected by dry rot and decay of the stonework; these were demolished in 1968, together with some of the servants' quarters, kitchens and offices, and notably the dining room on the site of the older Great Hall, to reduce maintenance costs. However this was considered detrimental to the building's architectural integrity, so in 1987 the lost wings were replaced by five new houses, modelled on the style of the hall. These houses were sold as private residences to raise money for the estate.

=== Architecture ===
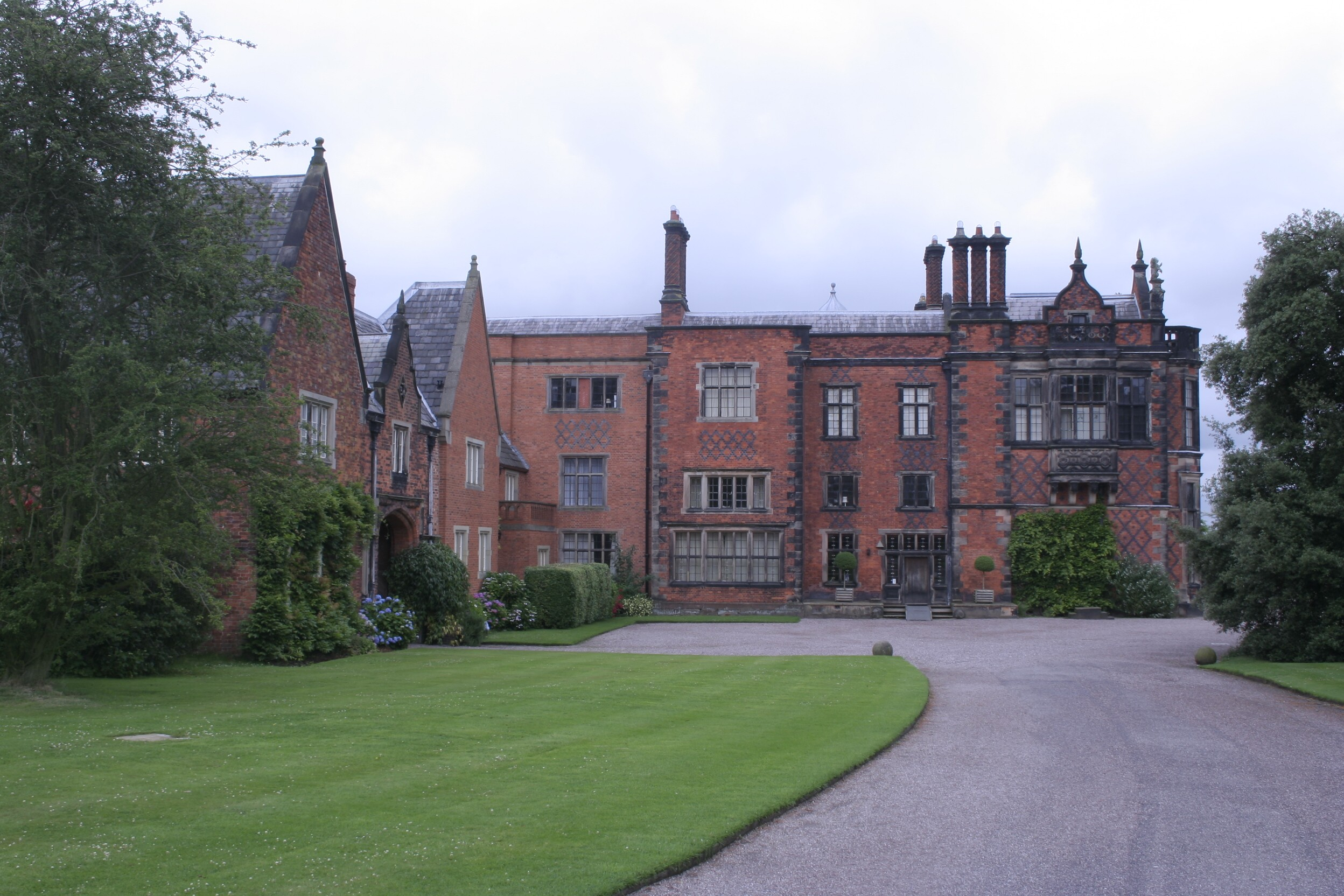
West front

==== Exterior ====
Designed in an "L" shape, the house is built of red brick with blue diaper patterning and stone dressings under a slate roof. It has two principal floors plus attics and a basement. The windows have stone surrounds, mullions and transoms. The south front is symmetrical, with seven bays and a pierced stone parapet. The external bays project forwards and have canted windows. A single-storey porch extends from the central bay. The building has a segmented entrance ornamented by a coat of arms in the spandrels flanked by Ionic columns. The west front includes a first-floor oriel window. The chimneys are in Tudor style, grouped in threes and fours.

==== Interior ====
The principal entrance was formerly through the porch on the south front, but its large doors caused too many draughts. In 1862 an entrance was created in the west front, leading to the West Hall, which contains panelling from the old house. The West Hall in turn leads into the Library, which has one of Latham's most elaborate ceilings. The windows contain French stained glass, designed and made in Paris by M. Lusson. The Library leads to the former Front Hall, which was transformed into the Dining Room when the original dining room was demolished in 1968. In the Dining Room is a portrait of a noblemen, attributed to Cornelis Jonson. The Gallery was the family's principal sitting-room during the 19th century. The overmantel of the fireplace contains sculptures depicting St George slaying the dragon and, on each side, personifications of Hope and Patience, with appropriate inscriptions. The Drawing Room is in a different style from the other rooms on the ground floor, being plastered rather than panelled, and it contains much gilding. The room is devoted to the memory of Rowland Egerton-Warburton and contains a number of family portraits. Its coved ceiling, also designed by Latham, has a frieze depicting birds eating grapes. The final room on the ground floor open to the public is the Small Dining Room. It has a barrel-shaped ceiling, again designed by Latham. In the room is a virginal dated 1675 by Stephen Keene, and is one of the oldest surviving English keyboard instruments. Its front is decorated with portraits of Charles II and Queen Catherine. The Grand Staircase is considered to be Latham's finest work in the house. The staircase itself and the doorways are made of oak, and the decoration is in plasterwork and strapwork. Above the staircase is a glass-walled domed ceiling.

On the upper floor, the South Bay Bedroom was originally the principal bedroom. It contains a collection of watercolours by Elizabeth Ashbrook. The Exhibition Room occupies a former dressing room and contains information about the history of the hall. The Emperor's Room is named after Prince Louis Napoleon, later Napoleon III, who stayed in the hall during the winter of 1847–48. It contains watercolours by Piers Egerton-Warburton, including pictures of timber-framed buildings in Northwest England and views of Arley and Great Budworth. The final room on the upper floor open to the public is the General's Room, dedicated to the memory of Sir George Higginson, the great-grandfather of the present Viscount Ashbrook, and contains memorabilia relating to him. Leading back to the ground floor is the Small Staircase, with its balustrade of oak capped with mahogany.

== Chapel ==
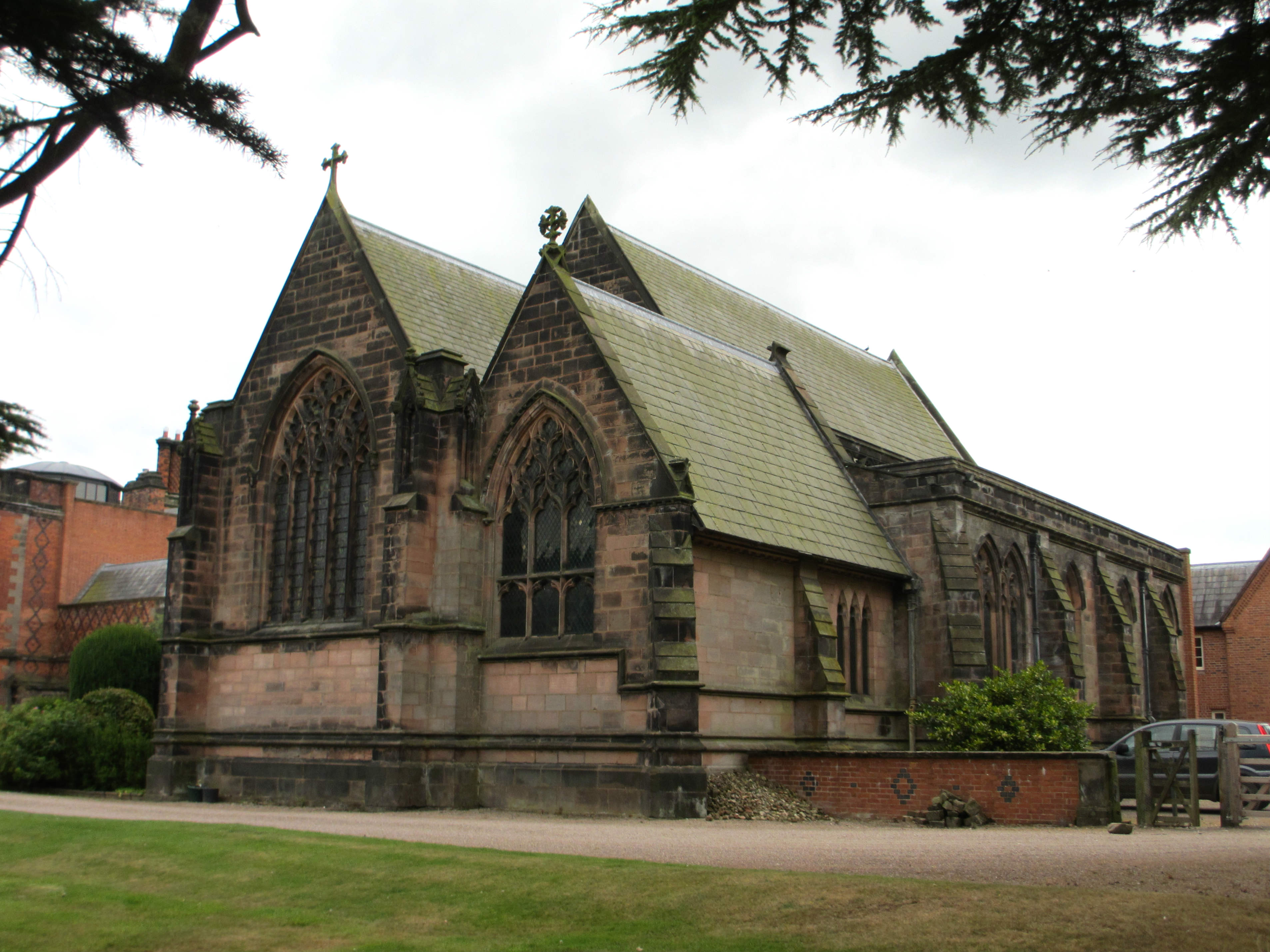
Chapel

=== History ===
Rowland Egerton-Warburton, influenced by the Oxford Movement, decided to add a Gothic chapel to the north-east of the house, and commissioned Anthony Salvin for the design. The chapel was consecrated in September 1845. In 1856–57 a north aisle and entrance porch designed by George Street were added. The chapel is dedicated to St Mary. The organ was made by Kirtland and Jardine of Manchester and services still take place in the chapel.

=== Architecture ===
The chapel is built in red sandstone and rendered brick with a slate and tile roof. The sandstone came from quarries in Runcorn. Its plan consists of a four-bay nave with a north aisle, a two-bay chancel, a porch and a bell turret to the north. On the east front is a canted oriel window supported on a buttress. The bell turret is octagonal with eight lancet openings at the bell stage and is surmounted by a red-tiled spirelet. Inside the chapel is a richly painted iron screen, which hides the central heating, and three corona-shaped chandeliers. The stained glass in the east window, dated 1895, is by Kempe. The font is a richly carved stone bowl on a cluster of marble columns. In the chancel is a piscina and a triple sedilia.

== Gardens ==
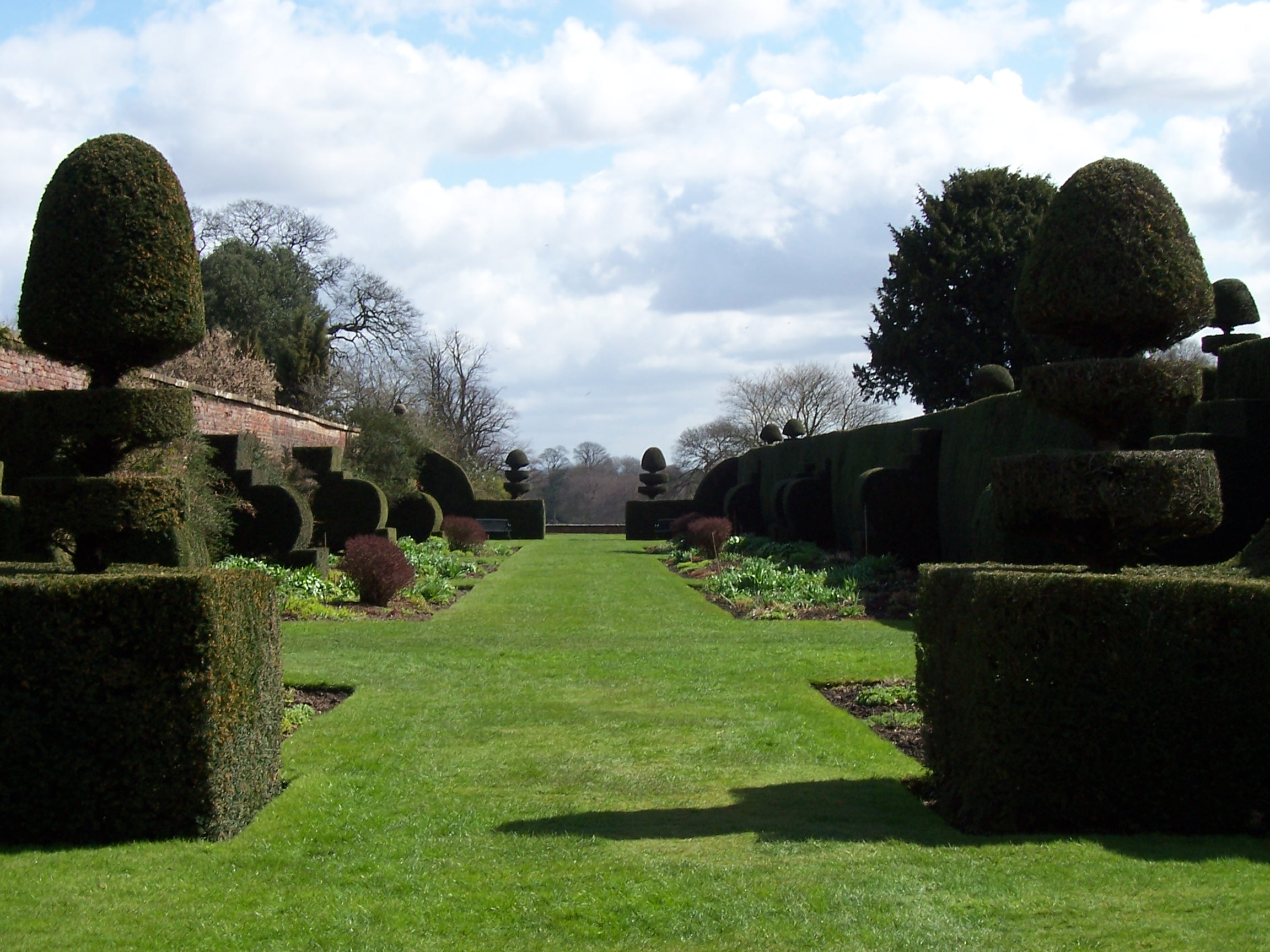
Herbaceous Border in autumn, looking to the east

=== History ===
The first gardens were created in the 18th century by Sir Peter Warburton, 4th Baronet, who developed pleasure grounds, a walled kitchen garden and a landscape park. Sir Peter Warburton, 5th Baronet, enlarged the park and engaged William Emes to develop a plan for the park and gardens. These gardens were mainly to the east of the house. In the 19th century Rowland and Mary Egerton-Warburton began to develop the area to the west of the house as pleasure gardens. The new features included a ha-ha designed by George Latham. The present gardens are much as the Egerton-Warburtons designed them. During the Second World War and for some years afterwards, the gardens were used to provide food for the house, and a skeleton staff prevented the pleasure gardens from total decay. In 1960 the gardens were opened to the public. They continue to be maintained in the style of a pre-war country house garden.

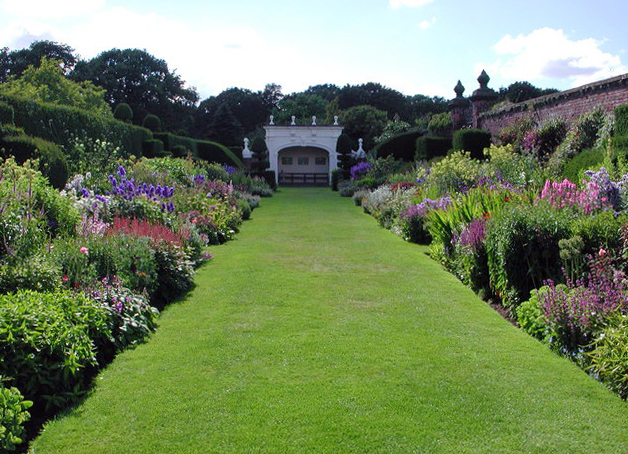
Herbaceous Border in summer, looking towards The Alcove

=== Description ===
The gardens and landscape park have been designated as Grade II* in the National Register of Historic Parks and Gardens. Designation as Grade II* on the Register means that the site is "particularly important, of more than special interest". They have been described as "some of the finest in Britain".

The formal gardens cover an area of 12 acres (4.9 ha). The visitor approaches the hall and gardens along an avenue of pleached lime trees which are clipped each year. The main path passes under the Clock Tower (see below) and a path on the right leads into the Flag Garden, so-called because its paths are formed from flagstones. This leads to the Furlong Drive, a straight path leading in a southwesterly direction from the house to the Sundial Circle, which is exactly a furlong (220 yd or ~200 m) in length. Parkland lies on the southeast side of the path, and this is separated from the formal gardens by the ha-ha. To the north of this path is the double Herbaceous Border, which was the first of its type in England. It consists of four pairs of flowerbeds which are backed on one side by a 19th-century wall and on the other by a yew hedge. Between the sections of the border are yews which have been pruned into decorative shapes. To the south of the herbaceous border is the Ilex Avenue which consists of seven pairs of holm oaks clipped into the shape of cylinders 8 metres (26 ft) high and 3 metres (9.8 ft) in diameter. In the angle between the Herbaceous Border and the Ilex Avenue is the Shrub Rose Garden.

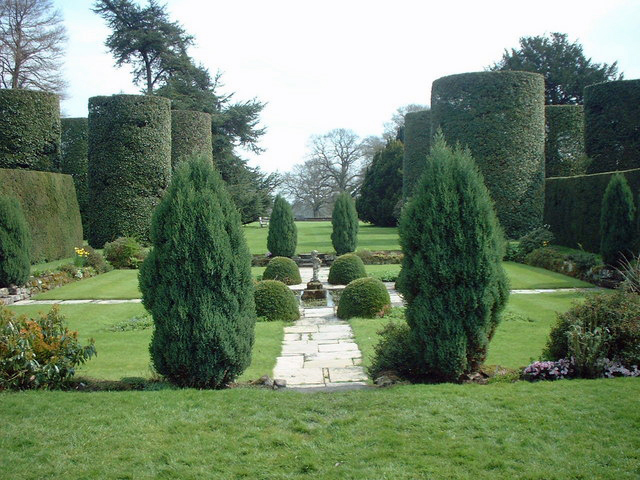
Looking across the Ilex Avenue

At the southwest end of the Furlong Drive is the Sundial Circle, which contains a sundial surrounded by a lawn and borders of shrub-roses and other flowering shrubs. From the Sundial Circle a path leads into an area known as the Rootree. This was created in the 19th century as an alpine rock garden but since 1960 it has been planted with flowering shrubs. From the Rootery paths lead to the Fish Garden, a small sunken garden containing a pond, and to the Rough, a semi-wild area. From the north end of the Ilex Avenue a gate leads into the Walled Garden. This was formerly one of the kitchen gardens and was redesigned in 1960. It contains a pond surrounded by statues of four heraldic beasts which were originally on the roof of the house. In the centre of the pond is a modern flower sculpture designed by Tom Leaper. This garden also contains lawns, trees and shrubs. To its east is the Kitchen Garden, where vegetables as well as flowers and crab apples are grown. To the east of the Kitchen Garden are two small gardens, the Herb Garden and the Scented Garden, the former containing herbs and the latter strongly scented flowers and shrubs.

The latest area to have been developed is the Grove, to the north and northeast of the hall. This formerly contained the path leading from Arley Green to the chapel but by the early 20th century it had become neglected. Beginning in about 1970 the area has been cleared and planted with a variety of trees, shrubs and bulbs. At the extreme east of the Grove a woodland walk has been created.

== Other features ==
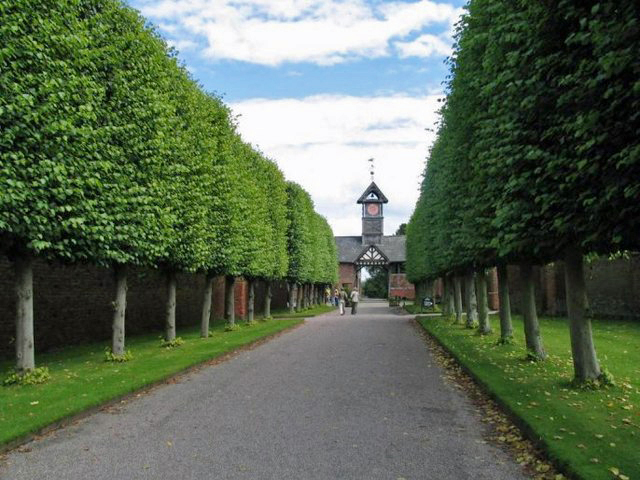
Approach along the Lime Avenue from the west, with the Clock Tower in the distance

The main entrance to the grounds is through an arch over which is the 19th-century Clock Tower. The clock it contains has only one hand. Extending from the south of the Clock Tower is a building now known as The Ride. This was originally a barn built in 1471 and converted into an indoor riding school in the 19th century. It is a timber framed building with brick infill on a stone plinth with a slate roof. Internally there are seven cruck trusses. This building is listed Grade I. A Grade I building is one which is "of exceptional interest, sometimes considered to be internationally important." In the other direction, extending to the north of the Clock Tower is another barn, this one dating from about 1602. It is built in brick with stone dressings and has a slate roof. It is now used as a tea shop and kitchen, and is listed Grade II. A Grade II building is "nationally important and of special interest". The forecourt walls and gate piers at the south front of the hall, and the balustrade to the east of the hall are listed Grade II. Both the Walled Garden and the Kitchen Garden are listed Grade II. At the western end of the Herbaceous Border is a structure known as The Alcove which was built about 1790. This is a garden seat enclosed in a decorated surround built in brick, rendered brick and stone. It is listed Grade II.

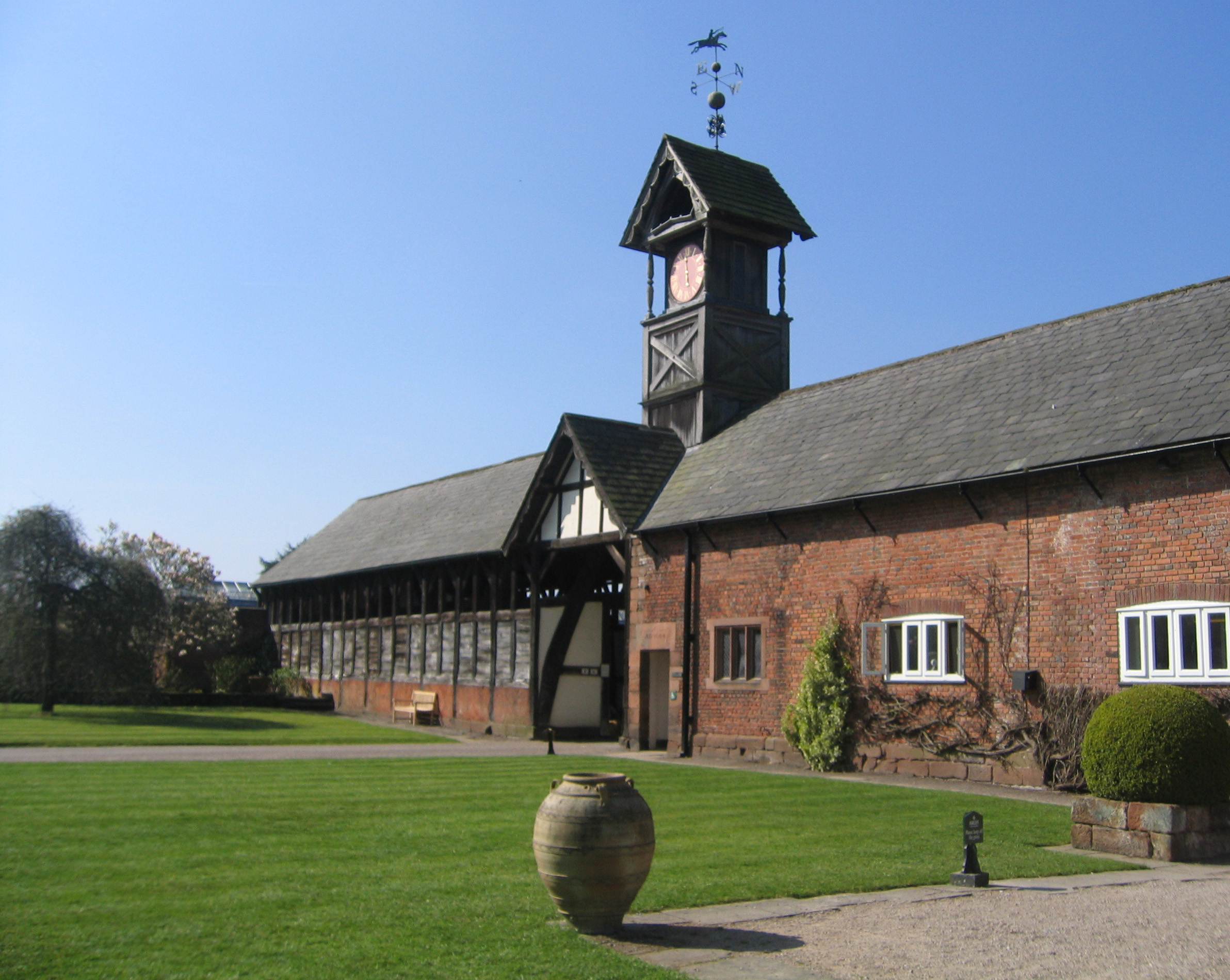
The Clock Tower from the northeast with the Ride on the left and the Tudor Barn to the right

Attached to the north wall of the Kitchen Garden is a greenhouse known as the Vinery which was built in 1872–73. It contains fig trees which were planted shortly after it was built. Originally this had a curved rood but this was replaced in 1921 by the present straight roof. It is listed Grade II. A sundial in the south forecourt of the house is also a Grade II listed structure. It dates from the 18th century and consists of a lead figure of a kneeling American Indian in a loincloth on a stone base with the dial on his head and a 20th-century gnomon. To the north of the Shrub Rose Garden is a half-timbered building known as the Tea Cottage. This was built in the mid-19th century and was used by the family for afternoon tea and garden parties; it now contains panels bearing verses, which were previously part of the tower above the south front of the main house (demolished in 1968). In the Kitchen Garden are two structures. One is a seat enclosed by an arch of Malus trees, known as the Malus Seat. Opposite this is a highly decorated arbour made from white-painted wirework.

The estate occupies an area of 2,000 acres (800 ha), which includes Stockley Farm's 750 acres (300 ha). Stockley is an organic farm growing fruit and other crops, and also has 200 milking cows. It is open to the public and is organised as a tourist attraction, particularly targeted at children.

== Present day ==
The hall and estate are situated to the south east of the village of Arley, at the end of a minor road running south from Appleton Thorn. The hall was designated as a Grade II* listed building on 5 March 1959, and the chapel was given the same grading on 7 September 1979. The hall, chapel, gardens, and grounds, are open to the public at advertised times. The hall is licensed for civil wedding ceremonies. Parts of the hall can be hired for private and corporate functions. The hall has been used as a location for filming.

A variety of events take place in the hall and its grounds, which, along with the Tudor Barn, are available for corporate or private hire. In January 2009, a further venue was opened. This was converted from former barns, is named Olympia, and has facilities for corporate events, weddings and parties. The Tudor Barn has been converted to a licensed restaurant, and a shop and plant nursery are nearby. In 1987 the gardens won the Christie's Garden of the Year Award. In 2008 they were selected as one of the Gardens of Distinction for Cheshire's Year of the Gardens. Stockley Farm is also open to the public at advertised times. The farm was given the award of Farm Attraction of the year 2007 through the National Farm Attractions Network and in 2008 was the Supreme Champion Farm in the Cheshire Farms Competition.

Arley Hall is used as a location for filming and photoshoots. It appeared in the series Cluedo as Arlington Grange and has doubled as Soames' house in The Forsyte Saga. It was also used as a backdrop for The Adventures of Sherlock Holmes and has been the scene of two Coronation Street weddings. In 2016, it appeared in the BBC television show Peaky Blinders, doubling as a house in Arrow, Warwickshire, the home of the main character, Thomas Shelby. The Netflix drama, Fool Me Once was filmed here. In 2023, Arley Hall was used for location filming for the British soap opera Hollyoaks.

A small part of the 2024 film Kraven the Hunter was also filmed at Arley Hall.

== See also ==
- Grade I listed buildings in Cheshire East
- Grade II* listed buildings in Cheshire East
- Listed buildings in Aston by Budworth
