= Alsager School =

Location
- Hassall Road; Alsager, Cheshire, ST7 2HR; England; 53.0991°N 2.3182°W

Information
- Type: Academy
- Motto: An Achieving School; A Caring Community.
- Department for Education URN: 140108 Tables
- Ofsted: Reports
- Chair of Governors: Lindsay Purcell
- Head teacher: Andrea O'Neil
- Staff: 150
- Gender: Coeducational
- Age: 11 to 18
- Enrolment: 1,500 pupils
- Houses: Dod, Lovell, Moreton, Royce
- Colours: Red, purple, green and blue
- Website: www.alsagerschool.org

Alsager School (formerly known as Alsager Comprehensive School) is a coeducational secondary school and sixth form with academy status, located in Alsager in the English county of Cheshire.

== Location ==
Alsager School is situated opposite the former Manchester Metropolitan University Alsager campus (former Cheshire County Training College), which is now a housing estate, and next to both Christ Church, Alsager and Alsager Leisure Centre. It is attended by over 1300 pupils from the local area.

== History ==
In September 2009 Alsager School became a Foundation School as it joined the Alsager Community Trust.

In September 2011, Richard Middlebrook replaced David Black as Headteacher.

The school converted to academy status in September 2013 and became part of the Alsager Multi Academy Trust (AMAT).

As of Easter 2018, Weston Village Primary School became part of AMAT.

In September 2020, Alsager Highfields Community Primary School joined AMAT.

== Academic performance ==
The school gets results above the England average at GCSE and the eighth best in Cheshire. At A level it gets results above the England average. Following the February 2016 Ofsted inspection, it was rated Outstanding, point four on a four-point scale.

== Notable former pupils ==
- Professor David Bailey, economist and commentator
- Mark Cueto, England international rugby player
