= Listed buildings in Betchton =

Betchton is a civil parish in Cheshire East, England. It contains 18 buildings recorded in the National Heritage List for England as designated listed buildings. Of these, one is listed at Grade II*, the middle grade, and the others are at Grade II. The parish is almost entirely rural. Many of the listed buildings are timber-framed farmhouses dating from the 16th and 17th centuries. The Trent and Mersey Canal runs through the parish, with eight associated structures listed: four bridges, two locks, and two mileposts. The other listed buildings are structures associated with the farmhouses, a country house, and a public house.

== Key ==
Grade	Criteria
II*	Particularly important buildings of more than special interest
II	Buildings of national importance and special interest

== Buildings ==
Name and location	Photograph	Date	Notes	Grade
Betchton Farmhouse; 53.1114°N 2.3122°W	—	Late 16th century	Additions were made to the farmhouse in the 17th century. It is timber-framed with brick infill, and has a corrugated asbestos roof. It is in two storeys with an attic. The original part of the building has been encased in brick, with a projecting service wing. To the right is the later part, which forms a projecting gabled wing. The windows are casements. Inside the farmhouse is a pair of cruck beams, and an inglenook.	II
Bank Farmhouse; 53.1188°N 2.3272°W		Late 16th to early 17th century	A timber-framed farmhouse with rendered infill and a tiled roof. It is in two storeys, with a double door and two dormers on the front. The windows are casements. On the right side is a single-storey bow window with a jettied storey above it.	II
Brook Farmhouse; 53.1304°N 2.3219°W	—	Late 16th to early 17th century	The farmhouse was extended in 1832 and again in the 20th century. It is timber-framed with rendered infill, has a tiled roof, and is in two storeys with attics. The original part has a rendered ground floor; the first floor and the gable are jettied. The first floor on the left side is also jettied. On this side are a French window and a mullioned and transomed window. The other windows are casements.	II
Dean Hill Farmhouse West; 53.1315°N 2.3290°W		Late 16th to early 17th century	The farmhouse is timber-framed with wattle and daub infill on a rendered plinth. It has some brick facing, and a tiled roof. The farmhouse is in two storeys, and the entrance front is pebbledashed. The windows are casements. Inside the farmhouse is an inglenook.	II*
Dean Hill Farmhouse South; 53.1311°N 2.3280°W	—	c. 1621	A timber-framed farmhouse refaced externally in brick, and with a tiled roof. It is in two storeys, and has a slightly projecting gabled wing at the right. To the rear is an additional 19th-century wing. The windows are casements.	II
Boults Green Farmhouse; 53.1357°N 2.3462°W		17th century	The farmhouse is partly timber-framed with brick infill, and partly in brick painted to resemble timber-framing. It is in two storeys with attics. On the right of the entrance front is a projecting wing with a jettied upper floor and a gable. The windows are casements.	II
Barn, Boults Green Farm; 53.1358°N 2.3459°W		17th century	A timber-framed barn with brick infill, and a roof of tile, slate and stone-slate. It is in two storeys, with stable doors and cart doors on the ground floor, and loft doors in the upper storey. On the right side is a flight of steps.	II
Romping Donkey public house 53.12250°N 2.33042°W		17th century	A former public house, timber-framed with brick infill and a tiled roof. It is in two storeys. To the right is a recessed 19th-century extension. The windows are casements.	II
Betchton Hall; 53.12855°N 2.30914°W	—	18th century	This is the substantial rebuilding of an older country house, and some timber-framing has been retained. It is built in brick with stone dressings and a slate roof, and was extended in the early 19th century. The house is in two storeys, and has a seven-bay entrance front with a central arched doorway. The left side of the house is in three bays, the central bay being recessed, with a Venetian window on each floor. The windows are sashes.	II
Canal bridge number 149; 53.12669°N 2.34734°W		c. 1772–75	The accommodation bridge over the Trent and Mersey Canal was designed by James Brindley and Hugh Henshall, and was extended in the early 1830s when lock number 60 was doubled. It is built in brick with stone coping and dressings. It has a double span, with the towpath passing under the south arch. There are wing walls terminating in piers. Inside both arches are cast iron guard plates.	II
Canal lock number 60; 53.12658°N 2.34709°W		c. 1772–75	The original lock on the Trent and Mersey Canal was designed by James Brindley and Hugh Henshall, and was doubled in the early 1830s, probably by Thomas Telford. Both locks are built in brick with stone coping and quoins, There is a central island with a cutwater, and a wooden footbridge crossing both locks.	II
Malkin's Bank lock 53.12912°N 2.35575°W		c. 1772–75	This is lock number 63 on the Trent and Mersey Canal. The original lock was designed by James Brindley and Hugh Henshall, and was doubled in the early 1830s, probably by Thomas Telford. Both locks are built in brick with stone coping and quoins, There is a central island with a cutwater, and a wooden footbridge crossing both locks.	II
Gate piers, Boults Green Farmhouse; 53.13583°N 2.34635°W		Mid- to late 18th century	The pair of gate piers is in sandstone ashlar. The piers have a square section, and cyma-moulded caps surmounted by ball finials.	II
Canal milepost 53.11854°N 2.30526°W		1819	The milepost stands by the towpath of the Trent and Mersey Canal. It is in cast iron, and consists of a circular post with a moulded head. It carries convex tablets inscribed with the distances in miles to Preston Brook and Shardlow.	II
Canal milepost 53.12167°N 2.32691°W		1819	The milepost stands by the towpath of the Trent and Mersey Canal. It is in cast iron, and consists of a circular post with a projecting quatrefoil. Above this is a plate divided vertically and inscribed with the distances in miles to Preston Brook and Shardlow.	II
Canal bridge number 146; 53.12175°N 2.32674°W		Early 19th century	The bridge carries Roughwood Road over the Trent and Mersey Canal. It is built in brick with stone dressings. There is a single span, and curved wing walls ending in square brick piers.	II
Canal bridge number 148; 53.12248°N 2.33771°W		Early 19th century	This is an accommodation bridge over the Trent and Mersey Canal. It is built in brick with stone dressings. There is a single span, and curved wing walls ending in square brick piers.	II
Canal bridge number 142; 53.11831°N 2.30771°W		Early to mid-19th century	An accommodation bridge crossing the Trent and Mersey Canal, it is built in brick. The coping, the voussoirs, the keystone and inscribed plaques (which pre-date a renumbering of the bridges and read '141') are in stone. The bridge is in a single span with a humped back, and has wing walls terminating in piers.	II

== See also ==
- Listed buildings in Alsager
- Listed buildings in Church Lawton
- Listed buildings in Hassall
- Listed buildings in Odd Rode
- Listed buildings in Sandbach
- Listed buildings in Smallwood
