= Listed buildings in Church Lawton =

៛Church Lawton is a civil parish in Cheshire East, England. It contains 14 buildings that are recorded in the National Heritage List for England as designated listed buildings. Of these, one is listed at Grade II*, the middle grade, and the others are at Grade II. The parish is partly residential, but mainly rural. It contains part of the Trent and Mersey Canal, and its junction with the Macclesfield Canal. Eight of the listed buildings are associated with the canal system, consisting of two bridges, two mileposts, two sets of locks, and two aqueducts. The other listed buildings are houses, a church, and a tombstone.

== Key ==
Grade	Criteria
II*	Particularly important buildings of more than special interest
II	Buildings of national importance and special interest

== Buildings ==
Name and location	Photograph	Date	Notes	Grade
All Saints Church; 53.09872°N 2.26787°W		11th or 12th century	The oldest part of the church is the reset south doorway which is Norman in style. The Perpendicular tower dates from the 16th century. In 1798 the body of the church was destroyed by fire, and was rebuilt in Neoclassical style. The tower is in sandstone and the body of the church is in brick with a tiled roof. Along the sides of the church are round-headed windows and lunettes, and at the east end is a Venetian window.	II*
Lawton Mere Cottage; 53.10803°N 2.29454°W	—	17th century	The house was extended in the 19th century. It is partly timber-framed with rendered infill, and partly in brick, and has a tiled roof. There are two storeys, and a front of three bays, the left bay being the extension. The windows are casements. The right gable end is slightly jettied, and to the right of it is a lean-to addition.	II
Green Farmhouse; 53.09847°N 2.27441°W	—	1744	A brick farmhouse with a tiled roof, it is in two storeys with an attic, and has a four-bay front. To the right of the centre is a doorway, above which is a rectangular datestone. The windows are casements, and in the attic are three gabled dormers. Attached to the left of the farmhouse and continuing behind it is a range of farm buildings that form a courtyard.	II
Lawton Hall; 53.09748°N 2.26562°W		18th century	Originally a country house, this was later used as a school, and after that was converted into residential accommodation. The building is in brick with stone dressings and has a slate roof. It is two and three storeys, and has a symmetrical front of nine bays with asymmetrical wings at each end. The central bays project forward under a pediment. They contain a doorway flanked by Doric columns, above which is a round-arched window containing a sash.	II
Church locks (number 48); 53.10120°N 2.27194°W		1772–75	A pair of narrow locks, numbered 48, on the Trent and Mersey Canal. The south lock was added in the early 1830s. The original lock was designed by James Brindley and Henry Henshall, and the added lock probably by Thomas Telford. Both chambers are in brick with stone dressings. Some of the grates are wooden, the other are steel. There is a wooden footbridge over both locks, and a south weir.	II
Hall's locks (number 49); 53.10271°N 2.27625°W		1772–75	A pair of narrow locks, numbered 49, on the Trent and Mersey Canal. The west lock was added in the early 1830s. The original lock was designed by James Brindley and Henry Henshall, and the added lock probably by Thomas Telford. The east lock is in brick with stone dressings, and the other lock has concrete facing. There is a wooden footbridge over both locks, and a west weir.	II
Milepost, lock number 47; 53.10095°N 2.27127°W		1819	The milepost stands on the towpath of the Trent and Mersey Canal. It is in cast iron, and consists of a circular post with a moulded head. It carries tablets inscribed with the distances in miles to Shardlow and Preston Brook.	II
Milepost, Red Bull Wharf; 53.09288°N 2.26041°W	—	1819	The milepost stands on the towpath of the Trent and Mersey Canal. It is in cast iron, and consists of a circular post with a moulded head. It carries tablets inscribed with the distances in miles to Shardlow and Preston Brook.	II
Barleybat Hall; 53.09837°N 2.27993°W	—	c. 1820	A large brick house on a stone plinth, with stone dressings and a slate roof. It has a double-pile plan, is in two storeys, and has a three-bay front. There is a central doorway with columns, a fanlight and an open pediment. The lateral bays contain two-storey bow windows. In each storey of these are three sash windows flanked by pilasters, and separated by Doric columns. Elsewhere are more sash windows, and some casements. At the rear of the house are twin gables with bargeboards.	II
Bridge number 136; 53.10126°N 2.27221°W		Early 19th century	An accommodation bridge over the Trent and Mersey Canal adjacent to lock number 48. It was extended in the early 1830s when the lock was duplicated and a south span was added. It is built in brick with stone dressings, and consists of two elliptical arches. The wing walls end in piers.	II
Hall's Bridge (number 137); 53.10288°N 2.27651°W		Early 19th century	An accommodation bridge over the Trent and Mersey Canal adjacent to lock number 49. It was extended in the early 1830s when the lock was duplicated and a west span was added. It is built in brick with stone dressings, and consists of two elliptical arches. The original bridge was designed by James Brindley and Henry Henshall, and the extension is probably by Thomas Telford.	II
Red Bull aqueduct 53.09261°N 2.25394°W		1828	The aqueduct carries the Macclesfield Canal over the A50 road. It is constructed in brick with stone dressings, parapets, and copings. The aqueduct consists of a single segmental arch, and contains an inscribed stone panel. The retaining walls curve towards pilaster buttresses, and then continue to end in square piers with pyramidal caps.	II
Pool Lock aqueduct 53.09261°N 2.25394°W		1829	The aqueduct carries the Macclesfield Canal over the Trent and Mersey Canal. It is constructed in brick with stone dressings, and consists of a single arch, which has an inscribed stone panel. The retaining walls curve towards pilaster buttresses.	II
Tombstone to a bullfinch 53.09790°N 2.26530°W	—	1853	A rectangular grey slate tombstone with a moulded top edge standing to the north of Lawton Hall. It carries an inscription, including a poem, bewailing the death of a bullfinch.	II

== See also ==
- Listed buildings in Alsager
- Listed buildings in Odd Rode
- Listed buildings in Betchton
- Listed buildings in Kidsgrove (Staffordshire)
