= Alsager =

Town and civil parish in Cheshire, England

Coordinates: 53.096°N 2.305°W

- Town
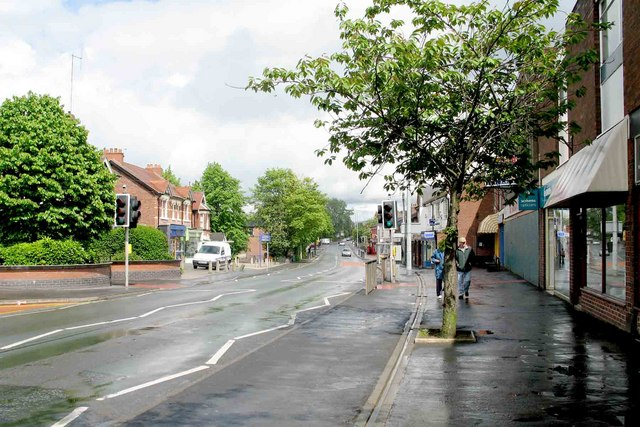
- Town centre

- Arms of Alsager

- Location within Cheshire
- Population: 13,389 (Parish, 2021); 15,505 (Built up area, 2021)
- OS grid reference: SJ796554
  - London: 144 mi (231 km) SE
- Civil parish: Alsager
- Unitary authority: Cheshire East
- Ceremonial county: Cheshire
- Region: North West
- Country: England
- Sovereign state: United Kingdom
- Post town: STOKE-ON-TRENT
- Postcode district: ST7
- Dialling code: 01270
- Police: Cheshire
- Fire: Cheshire
- Ambulance: North West
- UK Parliament: Congleton

Alsager (/ˈɔːlseɪdʒər/ AWL-say-jər) is a town and civil parish in the unitary authority of Cheshire East in Cheshire, England. It is located to the north-west of Stoke-on-Trent and east of Crewe. At the 2021 census, the parish had a population of 13,389 and the built up area population was 15,505.

The civil parish is bordered by the parishes of Betchton to the north, Church Lawton to the north-east and east, Kidsgrove to the south-east, Audley Rural to the south, Barthomley to the south-west, Haslington to the west, and Hassall to the north-west.

Alsager has hosted an annual summer carnival since 1998; it was located in Milton Park until June 2009 and moved temporarily to the Alsager School playing fields to increase capacity, before returning in 2017. In 2008, Alsager was awarded Fairtrade Town status by the Fairtrade Foundation.

== History ==
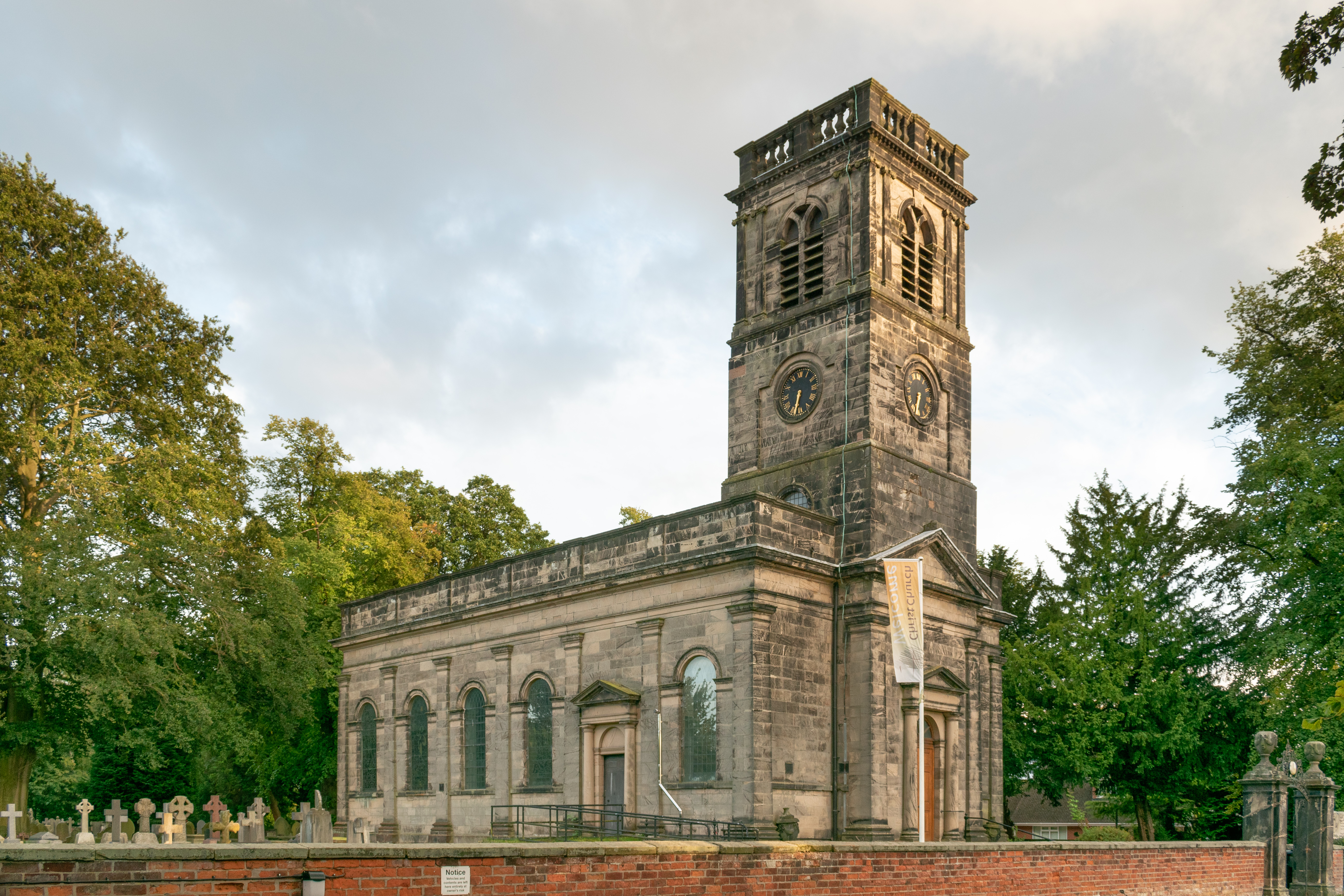
Christ Church, Alsager

In the village of Church Lawton are the Church Lawton Barrows, which form part of a significant Bronze Age site near the town.

The town's name means 'the arable land of a person named Ælle (Old English: Ælles æċer).

Alsager was recorded as 'Eleacier' in the Domesday Book of 1086, and was a small farming village until the 19th century when, due to its rail connections and rural character, it became a home of choice for pottery works managers from the nearby Federation of Six Towns which later became the city of Stoke-on-Trent.

During the Second World War, a large armaments factory was built outside Alsager at Radway Green, and the town expanded dramatically to house the influx of factory workers. Also during the war a camp was constructed for the training of Royal Marines. This bore the name of HMS Excalibur and was situated at the top of Fields Road by the side of the Stoke to Crewe railway line. In 1948 it became a displaced persons camp for refugees from Estonia, Latvia, Lithuania and the former Polish Ukraine, countries which had been forcibly incorporated into the Soviet Union. Many men from these countries had fought on the side of the Germans to try to regain independence, and they were afraid to return to their countries of origin, as many who had returned were executed by the Russians. A school was set up for the education of their children whose only common language when they arrived was German. The school continued to exist for many years in the same set of wooden huts under the name "Excalibur School". The first Roman Catholic church in Alsager was one of the wooden huts and was attended mainly by the Lithuanians, most of whom were Roman Catholic. The Anglican churches are Christ Church (1789), and St Mary Magdalene (1898).

Alsager previously had three Methodist churches at Hassall Road (Wesleyan), Wesley Place (Wesleyan) and Crewe Road (Primitive Methodist). By December 2009 two Methodist churches remained, but today there is just one.

The Roman Catholic community is served from St Gabriel's Church. The parish is located in the Diocese of Shrewsbury (Central Cheshire Region – Local Pastoral Area 9).

== Governance ==
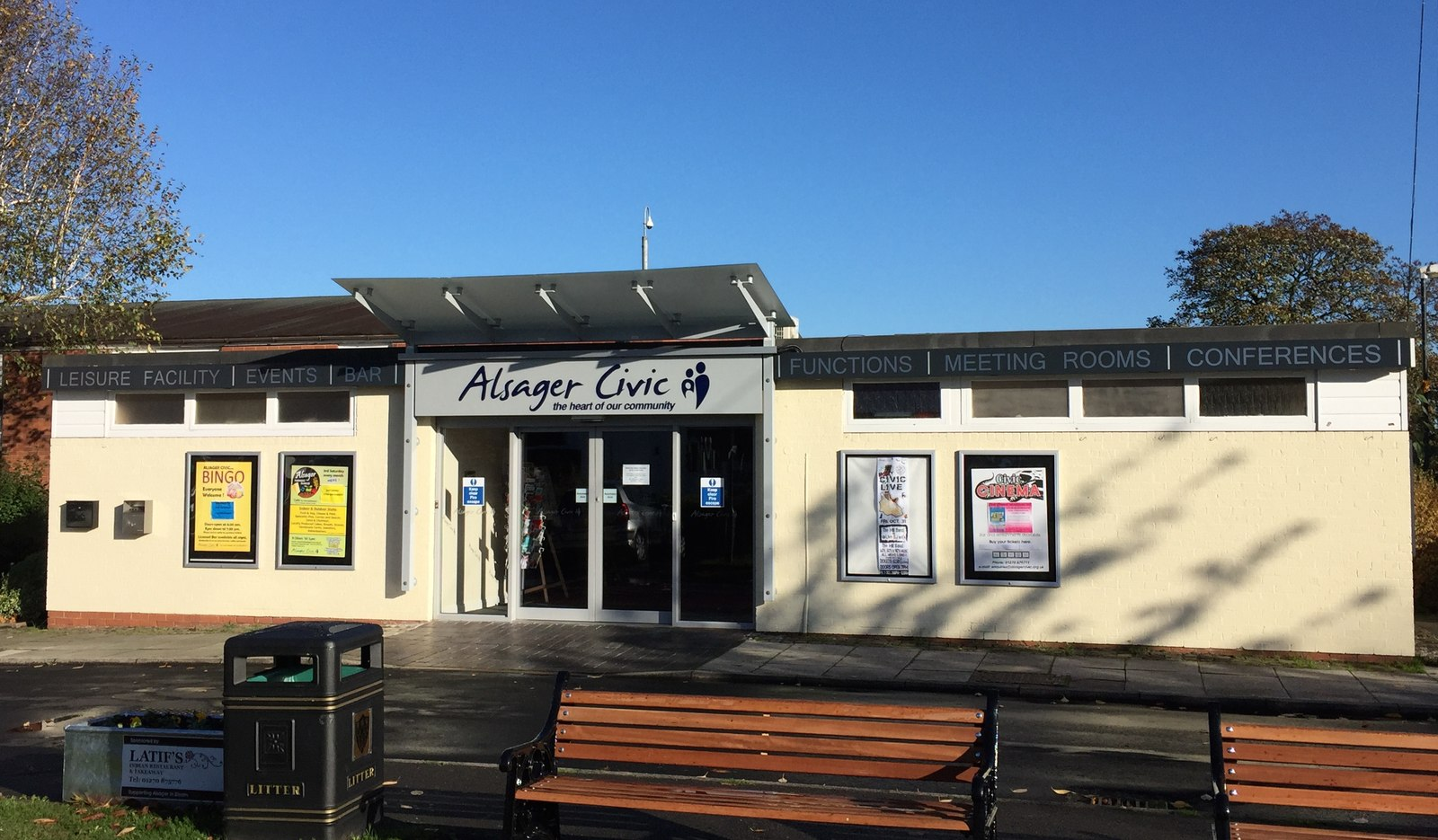
Alsager Civic

There are two tiers of local government covering Alsager, at parish (town) and unitary authority level: Alsager Town Council and Cheshire East Council. The town council meets at Alsager Civic on Lawton Road.

=== Administrative history ===
Alsager was historically a township within the ancient parish of Barthomley, which formed part of the Nantwich hundred of Cheshire. From the 17th century onwards, parishes were gradually given various civil functions under the poor laws, in addition to their original ecclesiastical functions. In some cases, including Barthomley, the civil functions were exercised by each township separately rather than the parish as a whole. In 1866, the legal definition of 'parish' was changed to be the areas used for administering the poor laws, and so Alsager became a civil parish. Alsager subsequently also became a separate ecclesiastical parish from Barthomley in 1898 following the completion of St Mary Magdalene's Church. (The earlier Christ Church at Alsager had been a chapel of ease to St Bertoline's at Barthomley.)

In 1894, Alsager was made a local government district. Later that year, local government districts were reconstituted as urban districts under the Local Government Act 1894.

Alsager Urban District was abolished in 1974 under the Local Government Act 1972. A successor parish called Alsager was established covering area of the abolished urban district, with its parish council taking the name Alsager Town Council. District-level functions passed to Congleton Borough Council. In 2009, Cheshire East Council was created, taking over the functions of the borough council and Cheshire County Council, which were both abolished.

== Culture ==
The town is home to Alsager Community Theatre (ACT), an amateur drama group founded in 1973. ACT puts on its productions at Alsager Civic Centre and at nearby Little Moreton Hall.

Alsager Arts Centre, formerly housed on Manchester Metropolitan University's Alsager campus, had a public programme of touring new performances and visual art work presented in two seasons (September–November and January–March). The centre moved to the university's Crewe campus when the Alsager campus closed under the title of the Axis Arts Centre but it was closed in spring 2019 because of the planned withdrawal of the university from Crewe. The Arts Centre hosted performance companies such as Forced Entertainment and artists such as Bobby Baker.

Alsager hosts the annual Alsager Music Festival which takes place in Milton Gardens. In August 2010, Alsager hosted the first annual Alsager Arts Festival.

== Education ==
=== Schools ===
Public education, at primary and secondary school level, is managed by Cheshire East Council and the Alsager Community Trust. The Alsager Community Trust is a co-operative trust, in which all the schools in the town are members. Secondary education is provided by Alsager School, an Academy school, that is situated opposite the former Manchester Metropolitan University campus. It is attended by over 1,300 pupils between the ages of 11 and 18. Alsager School is a Business and Enterprise College.

Six primary schools feed into Alsager School: Alsager Highfields, Cranberry Academy, Excalibur Primary School, Pikemere School, Rode Heath School and St Gabriel's R.C. Primary School.

=== Former Manchester Metropolitan University ===
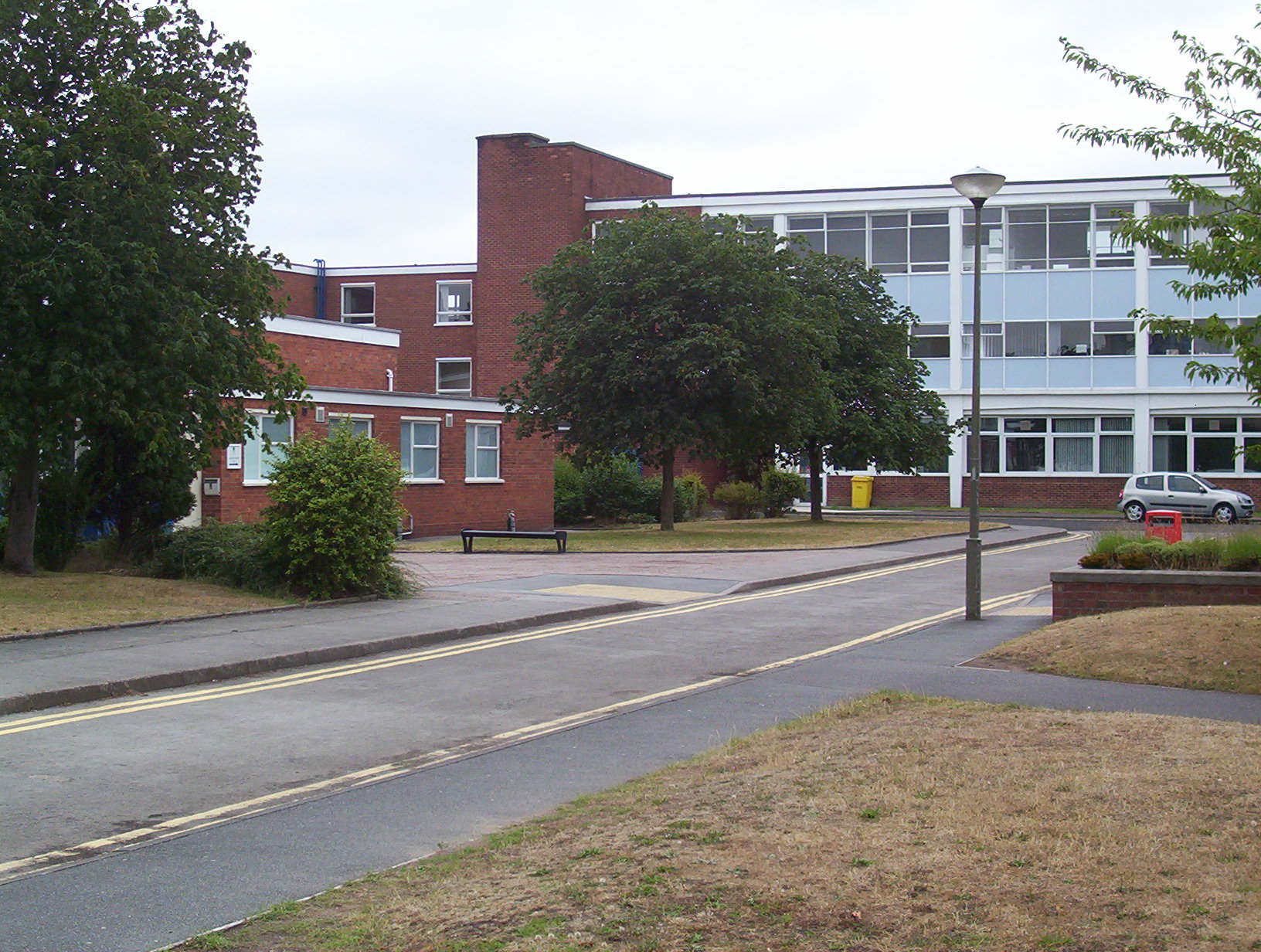
The former Alsager campus of Manchester Metropolitan University, long since closed and demolished

During the Second World War a hostel built of wooden army huts was constructed on the site of the MMU to house workers at the Royal Ordnance Factory, Radway Green, and was called "Heathside". In 1945 it became "Alsager Training College" for the training of teachers which were in short supply at that time. The wooden huts were still in use for housing of students until the early 1960s. The MMU Alsager was home to the Contemporary Arts and Sports Science Departments of the Manchester Metropolitan University. The University absorbed the former Crewe & Alsager College of Higher Education, forming the Crewe and Alsager Faculty, subsequently renamed MMU Cheshire. The Alsager Arts Centre was also on campus, and promoted touring contemporary dance, music, theatre, live art, performance writing and visual art events to the public as well as members of the University community.

In 2006 the university started transferring staff and departments from Alsager to the Crewe campus, as part of plans for closure of the Alsager site. The Arts Centre also moved to the MMU campus in Crewe, and was renamed the Axis Arts Centre. As of 2012 the entire Alsager campus had long since closed and fallen into disrepair.

In 2015 the former campus on Hassall Road was earmarked for a total of 408 new houses. By early 2018 all of the campus buildings had been demolished and the site cleared. Soon afterwards, construction of a new housing estate named "Scholar's Place" commenced on the site of the former Alsager campus.

== Transport ==
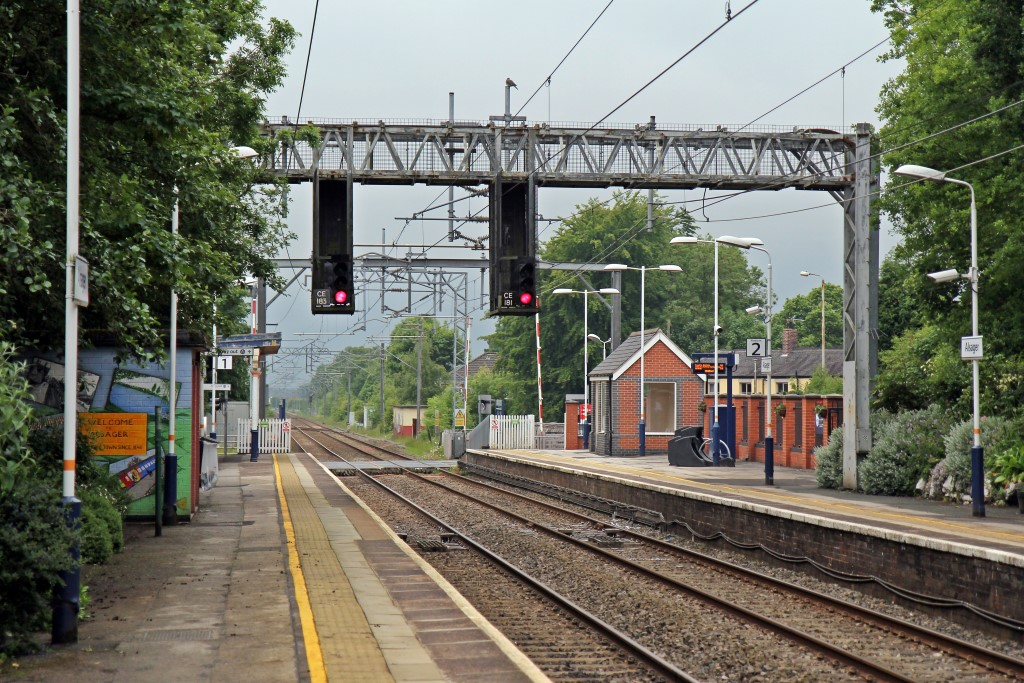
Alsager station

Alsager is close to junction 16 of the M6 motorway.

The town is served by Alsager railway station, with East Midlands Railway services on the Crewe to Derby line and West Midlands Trains services from Crewe to Stafford; both operate hourly during weekday off-peak times.

Local bus services are provided by First Potteries and D&G Bus. Key routes provide services to Crewe, Hanley, Rode Heath, Sandbach, Leighton Hospital and Congleton.

The Trent and Mersey Canal runs just to the north-east to the town, forming part of the Cheshire Ring canal walk and the South Cheshire Way footpath. The canal's towpath and the nearby Salt Line are also routes of the National Cycle Network.

== Media ==
Local news and television programmes are provided by BBC North West and ITV Granada. Television signals are received from the Winter Hill TV transmitter. Local radio stations are BBC Radio Stoke, Hits Radio Staffordshire & Cheshire, Greatest Hits Radio Staffordshire & Cheshire, HitMix Radio, and Silk 106.9. The town's local newspapers are the Alsager Chronicle and The Sentinel.

== Economy ==
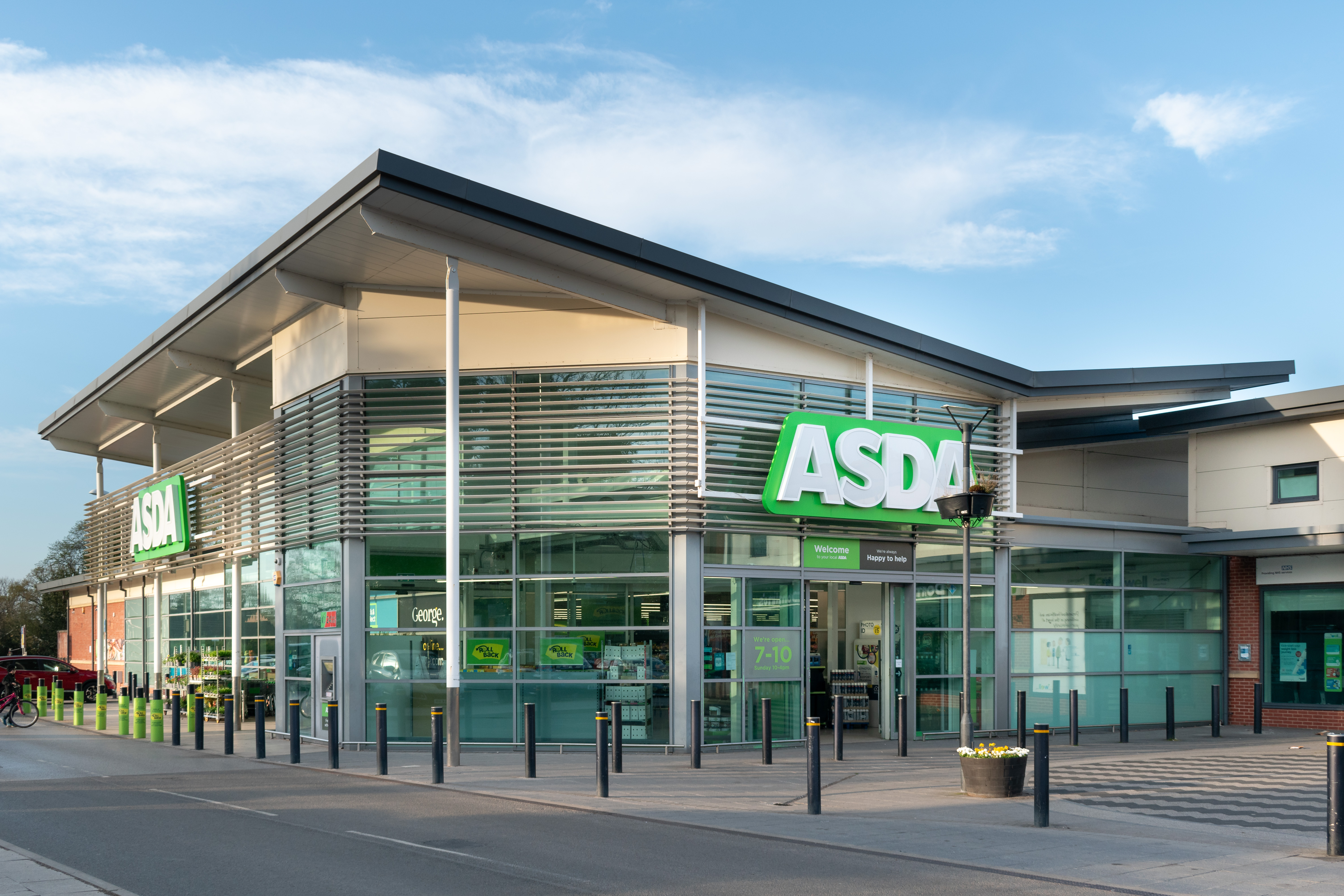
Asda supermarket in Alsager

Alsager town centre is characterised by independent and charity shops. The only national chain supermarkets in the town are a medium-sized Asda supermarket, a medium-sized Sainsbury's with a petrol station and a Sainsbury's Local.

There is a BAE Systems Global Combat Systems factory in the nearby village of Radway Green, producing small arms ammunition for the British armed forces.

=== Developments ===
Between 2012 and 2021 Alsager town centre has been redeveloped somewhat:The Co-operative Food store was rebuilt and enlarged in 2012, but it was sold off and converted to an Asda supermarket in 2015. A Town Square has been created, Fairview park has been rebuilt and capacity at Fairview Car park has been increased. In April 2014 Cheshire East Council gave planning permission for the development of a new Sainsbury's store on the former Twyfords site off Lawton Road. The new store, with petrol station, was opened in January 2025.

There were proposals to build 1267 new build houses, a new supermarket and petrol station in Alsager.

== Sport ==
Alsager is home to Alsager Town F.C. The club competes in the North West Counties Football League and plays its home matches at Wood Park. AFC Alsager is a more recent addition to the town's sporting teams. Established in 2012, the club has over 26 different teams, including a first team at Step 7 in the FA Pyramid System. The Alsager Football Group is a community sports group. Its purpose is to provide local residents with the opportunity to play casual football matches. Alsager is also home to Alsager Old Boys FC and Linley Tavern FC.

Alsager also has Alsager Cricket Club, the Alsager Golf and Country Club, the Alsager Institute Bowling Club, the Alsager Company of Archers, Triton Hockey Club, Alsager Lawn Tennis Club, The Wood Park Wulruds, a pool league and a swimming club.

There is a leisure centre in Alsager, managed by Cheshire East Council. On 25 October 2019, the new Alsager Sports Hub opened on the former MMU campus on Dunnocksfold Road. The hub contains a pavilion, five grass football pitches, a 3G football pitch and a 2G hockey pitch. It is home to Triton Hockey Club and AFC Alsager.

Alsager hosts a 5-mile road race, each year in February. The event attracts many of the UK's top endurance athletes, such as Shay Norman.

== Parks ==
Alsager has several parks. The town's main park is Milton Garden, which has an ornamental sunken garden, a skatepark, a small children's football pitch and a play area.

== Pastimes and leisure pursuits ==
There is a tradition of allotment holding in the town, administered by the Alsager Gardens Association.

== Notable people ==
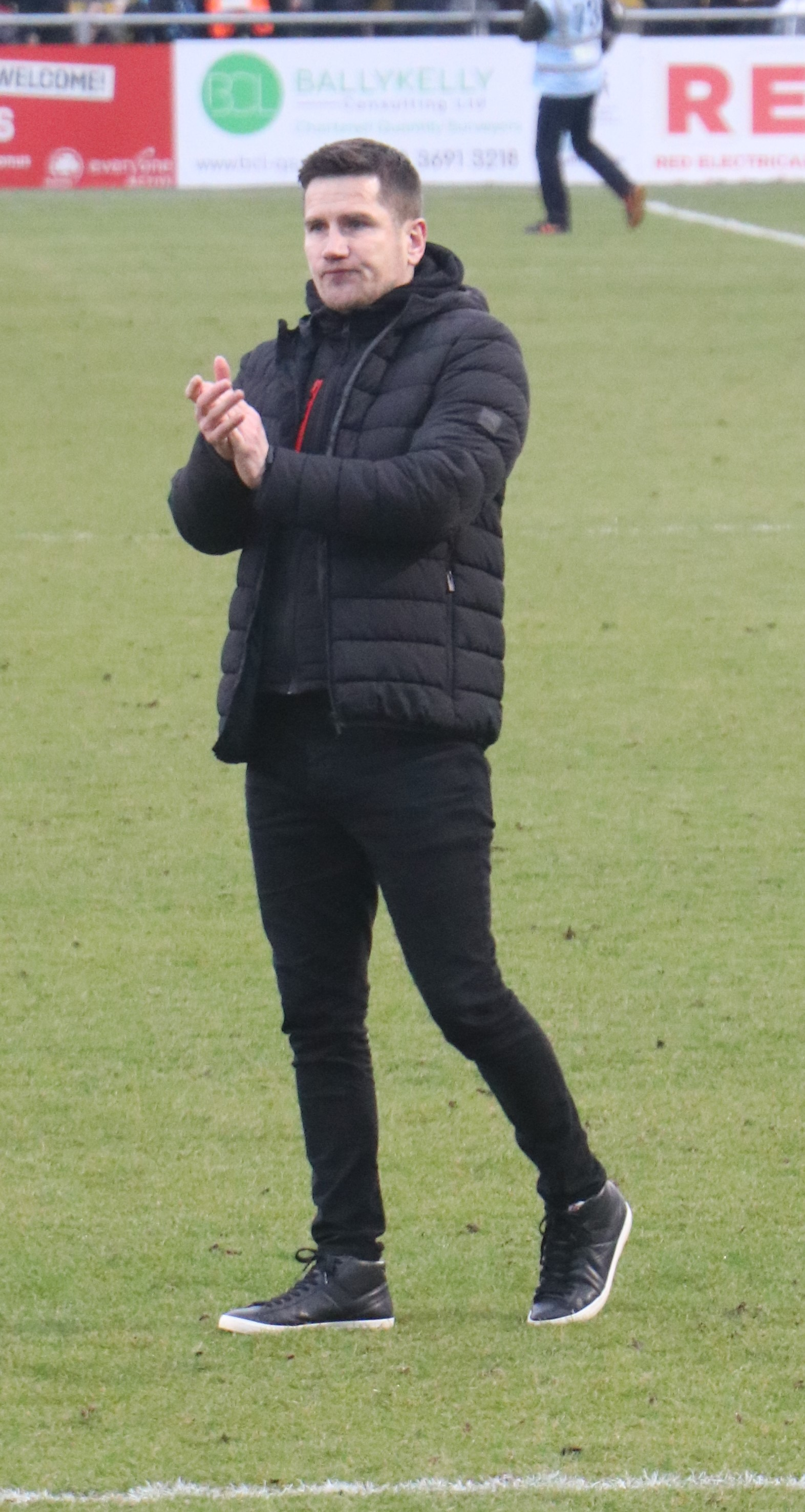
football manager, Lee Bell, 2023

- John Crew (1603–1670), barrister and politician, MP for Cheshire in 1654
- James Lloyd (1905–1974) artist, mostly painted animals and country landscapes, he grew up on a local farm.

=== Sport ===
- Arthur Lockett (1877–1957), footballer who played 311 games, mainly for Watford F.C. & Preston North End
- William John Branch (1911–1985) was an English professional golfer from Alsager
- Lee Bell (born 1983 in Alsager) football manager and former player, played 347 games, currently the manager of Crewe Alexandra
- Shaun Miller (born 1987 in Alsager), footballer, played over 400 games incl. Crewe Alexandra F.C. & Nantwich Town F.C.
- Lloyd Saxton (born 1990 in Alsager), footballer who played 68 games for Swedish football club GIF Sundsvall.
- Rowan Cheshire (born 1995 in Alsager) freestyle skier who represented Great Britain at the 2018 Winter Olympics.
- Tara Bourne (born 2003 in Alsager) women's football player for Southampton F.C. Women

== Nature ==
The Mere is a lake in the centre of Alsager; this isolated pool, once the focal point of the town, is only accessible by two fenced public viewing areas and by local residents who have gardens adjoining the waters.

Alsager is home to Borrow Pit Meadows, a local beauty spot situated in the north of the town, which leads on to the Salt Line.

The town has woodlands leading to Church Lawton.

Fairy House on Merelake Way

Near to the railway station, there is another walkway called Merelake Way; this runs mostly alongside Alsager Golf Course.
