= Lawton Hall =

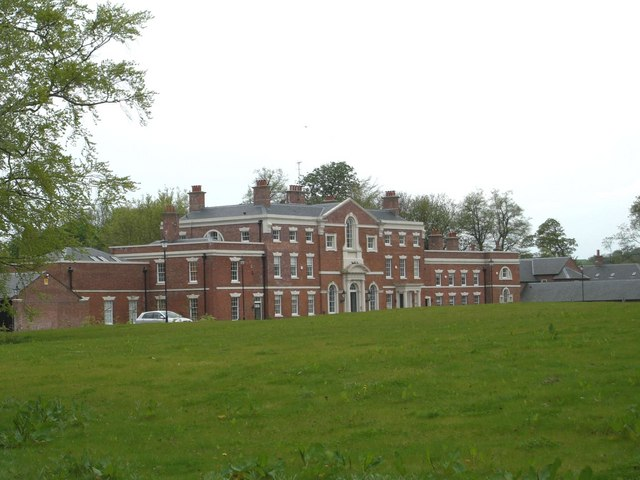
- Lawton Hall, entrance front

- Location in Cheshire
- 53.09749°N 2.26561°W
- Location: Church Lawton, Cheshire, England
- OS grid reference: SJ 823 556

Listed Building – Grade II
- Designated: 6 June 1952
- Reference no.: 1138763

Lawton Hall is a former country house to the east of the village of Church Lawton, Cheshire, England. The building has since been used as a hotel, then a school, and has since been converted into separate residential units. It is recorded in the National Heritage List for England as a designated Grade II listed building.

== History ==
The estate on which the house stands was in the possession of the Lawton family from at least since the 13th century. The first house on the site burnt down in the early 15th century. This was followed by a more substantial house, which was replaced by the present house in about 1600. Although the core of this house dates from the 17th century, the exterior dates from the middle of the 18th century. Wings were added in the 1830s. The porch was built in about 1860, and a billiard room was added during the 19th century. Although the house was still owned by the Lawton family, it was being used as a hotel in 1906. During the Second World War it was used as a Civil Defence Reserve Camp. Between 1950 and 1986 the house was a school, the Lawton Hall School. In 1989 plans to turn it into a hotel were passed, but were never implemented. At some time around this period the building was badly damaged by fire. In 1999 a property development company converted the hall into four houses and five apartments. Surrounding buildings were also converted for residential use, and houses were built in the adjoining estate.

== Architecture ==
=== Exterior ===
The house is constructed in red brick with stone dressings and a slate roof. The entrance front is symmetrical in nine bays, with asymmetrical wings on each side. The central three bays project forward and have two storeys. In the middle bay is a round-arched doorway, now blocked but containing a sash window. At the sides of the doorway are Doric half-columns, and over the door is a Doric entablature and a segmental pediment. Above this is a tall round-arched window surround containing a sash window, above which is another pediment. In the bay on each side is a round-headed window in the lower storey and a smaller flat-headed window in the storey above. The lateral three bays on each side have 2½ storeys, with larger sash windows in the lower two storeys, and smaller windows above. The exception is the middle bay to the right of the central section that contains a single-storey porch with Doric columns. The right-hand wing has four bays plus a projecting pavilion containing a Venetian window in the lower storey and a diocletian window above. The left-hand wing has two bays, with a recessed three-bay billiard room beyond. The garden front is also symmetrical and in nine bays. At the centre is a two-storey semi-octagonal bay window. In its lower storey is a Venetian window that has been converted into a French window. On each side of it are Ionic pilasters, and above it are roundels. Over all this is an arched window.

=== Interior ===
Inside the building, before the fire and conversion into separate residential units, Pevsner reported that there was a 17th-century staircase and two Jacobean fireplaces. The two main rooms in the centre of the house contained plaster ceilings and chimneypieces in Rococo style. The study to the left of the entrance hall had 17th-century oak panelling, as did three rooms in the attic.

== See also ==
- Listed buildings in Church Lawton
