= All Saints Church, Church Lawton =

Coordinates: 53.0987°N 2.2678°W

All Saints’ Church, Church Lawton
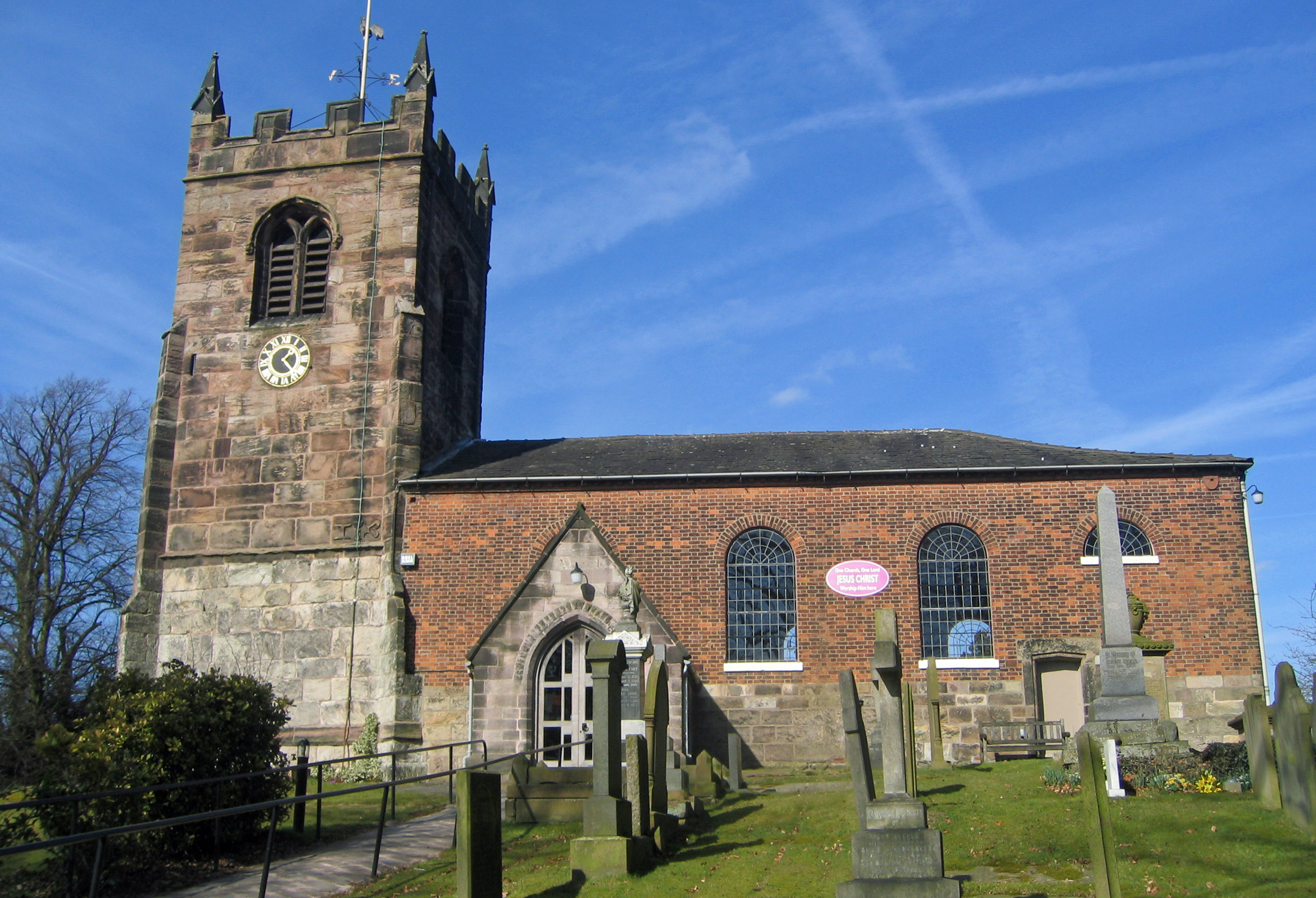
- All Saints’ Church, Church Lawton, from the south

- Location in Cheshire
- OS grid reference: SJ 822 556
- Location: Church Lawton, Cheshire
- Country: England
- Denomination: Anglican
- Website: http://www.allsaintschurchlawton.co.uk/

History
- Status: Parish church
- Founded: Late 11th century
- Founder(s): Hugh de Mara, Lord of Lawton (?)
- Dedication: All Saints
- Events: Struck by lightning 1652; Nave destroyed by fire 1798

Architecture
- Functional status: Active
- Heritage designation: Grade II*
- Designated: 14 February 1967
- Architectural type: Church
- Style: Norman, Perpendicular, Neoclassical
- Completed: 1923
- Construction cost: £8,000

Specifications
- Materials: Tower: red and buff sandstone Body: brick, tile roof

Administration
- Province: York
- Diocese: Chester
- Archdeaconry: Macclesfield
- Deanery: Congleton
- Parish: Church Lawton

Clergy
- Rector: in Interregnum

All Saints’ Church stands on a mound close to Lawton Hall in the small village of Church Lawton, Cheshire, England. It is recorded in the National Heritage List for England as a designated Grade II* listed building, and is an Anglican parish church in the diocese of Chester, the archdeaconry of Macclesfield and the deanery of Congleton.

== History ==
The church was founded around the end of the 11th century, probably by Hugh de Mara, Lord of Lawton. There is a tradition that in the 8th century the body of St Werburgh rested overnight on the site of the church while it was being carried from Lincolnshire to Chester. In 1652 the church was struck by lightning and 11 people in the church were killed. The body of the church was destroyed by fire in 1798 and rebuilt by 1803. Following the fire of 1798 the body of the church was rebuilt in brick in neoclassical style. The cost of this was around £8,000 (equivalent to £890,000 in 2025). A south porch was added as a War Memorial in 1923.

== Architecture ==
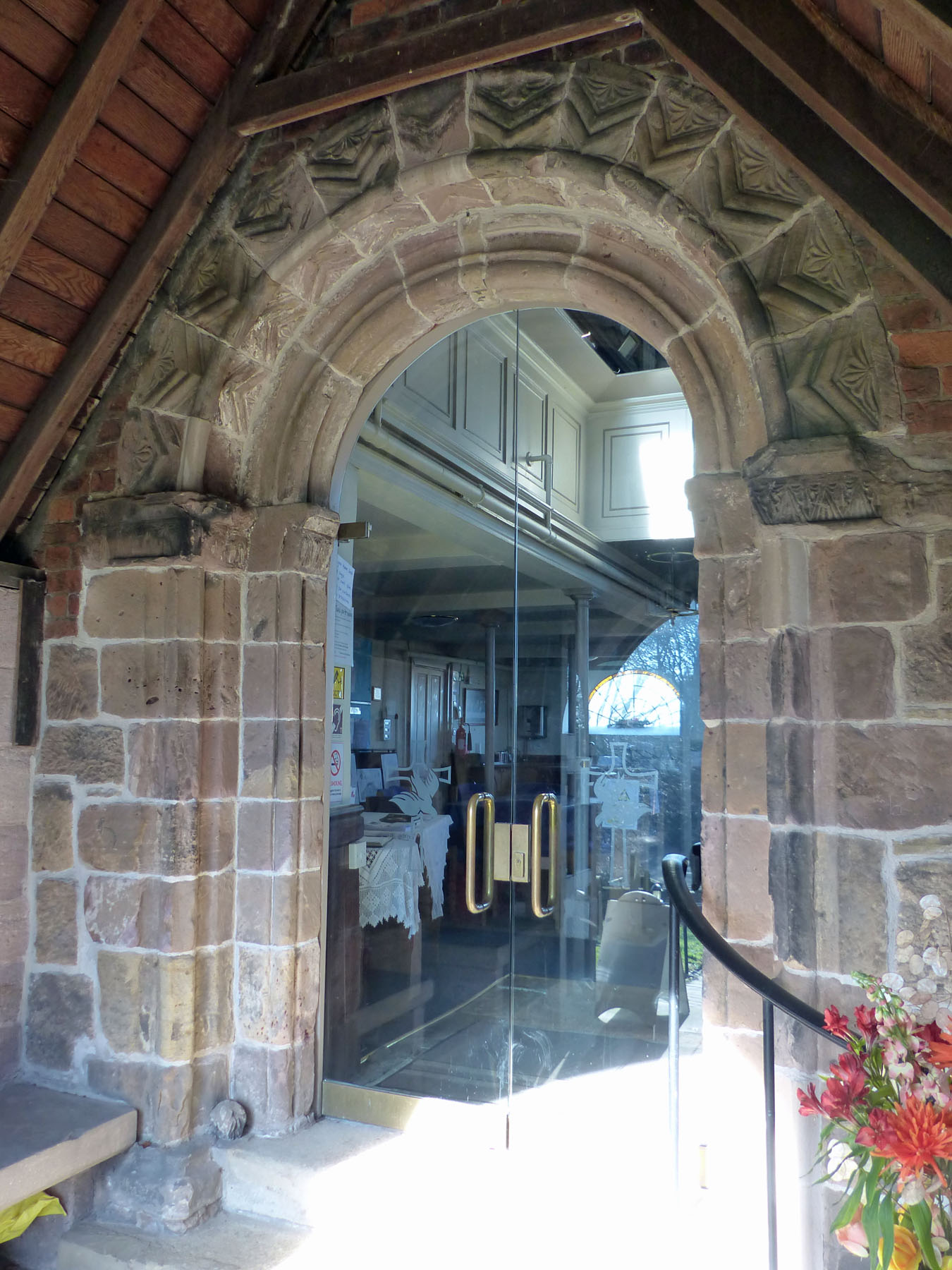
Reset Norman doorway

=== Exterior ===
The tower at the west end, dating from the 16th century, is built of red and buff sandstone in Perpendicular style. On the south face of the tower are carved a chalice and the initials "I. B.". These initials are those of the parish priest of the time, John Bybber, or Byber. The bell openings contain Y-tracery. On each side of the church are two lunette windows, with two round-headed windows between them. At the east end of the church is a Venetian window. A Norman doorway which survived the fire of 1798 has been reset in the south wall of the nave.

=== Interior ===
Inside the church at the west end is a gallery dated 1717 which also survived the fire. It was planned to refurbish the church in 1873 but the full refurbishment did not occur. At the time the old box pews were replaced with the present pews and a two-manual organ was installed in the gallery. Also inside the church are the royal arms of George III and six hatchments of the Lawton family. At the base of a stairway leading to the gallery is the tomb of John Byber on which are carved his initials. Displayed under the gallery are some 13th-century flooring tiles which were discovered during the 1874 restoration. There is a ring of eight bells. Five of these which are dated 1713 are by Richard Sanders; the other three are by John Taylor and Company, one of which is dated 1882 and the other two are dated 1901. The parish registers start in 1559 and the churchwardens' accounts date from 1691.

== External features ==
The churchyard contains the war graves of two First World War soldiers. In the rectory garden is a font dating from the middle of the 18th century.

== See also ==
- Norman architecture in Cheshire
- Listed buildings in Church Lawton
