= Lloyd Saxton =

Swedish-English footballer

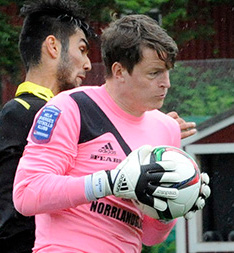

Personal information
- Full name: Lloyd John Saxton
- Date of birth: 18 April 1990 (age 36)
- Place of birth: Alsager, Cheshire, England
- Position: Goalkeeper

Youth career
- 1997: Liverpool
- 1998–2005: Bolton Wanderers
- 2005–2006: Stoke City

Senior career*
Years	Team	Apps	(Gls)
2006–2010	Plymouth Argyle	0	(0)
2010–2011	Bradford City	0	(0)
2011–2012	Vauxhall Motors	3	(0)
2012–2014	Ånge IF	68	(0)
2015–2021	GIF Sundsvall	10	(0)
2017	→ Levanger (loan)	0	(0)
- * Club domestic league appearances and goals as of 09:31, 18 January 2021 (UTC)

Lloyd John Saxton (born 18 April 1990) is an English former footballer who played as a goalkeeper.

== Career ==
Saxton was born in Alsager and played in the academies at Liverpool, Bolton Wanderers and Stoke City before turning professional with Plymouth Argyle in 2008. He was released by Argyle in May 2010 without making a first team appearance. Saxton spent the 2010–11 season at Bradford City but failed to make an appearance. Saxton then played for non-league Vauxhall Motors before moving to Sweden to play for Ånge IF. Saxton joined GIF Sundsvall in February 2015. He made his Allsvenskan debut on 7 June 2015 in a 1–1 draw with Kalmar FF. In January 2021, it was announced that after five years, Saxton would be leaving Sundsvall.

On April 1, 2021, Saxton announced on his social media that he had retired from football despite having several offers from teams in Sweden.

== Personal life ==
In October 2018, Saxton became a Swedish citizen.
