= Betchton =

Civil parish in Cheshire East, England

Coordinates: 53.124069°N 2.329085°W

- Location within Cheshire
- Population: 677 (2011)
- OS grid reference: SJ780585
- Civil parish: Betchton
- Unitary authority: Cheshire East
- Ceremonial county: Cheshire
- Region: North West
- Country: England
- Sovereign state: United Kingdom
- Post town: Sandbach
- Postcode district: CW11
- Dialling code: 01270
- Police: Cheshire
- Fire: Cheshire
- Ambulance: North West
- UK Parliament: Congleton

Betchton is a civil parish in the unitary authority of Cheshire East and the ceremonial county of Cheshire, England. According to the 2001 census it had a population of 620, increasing to 677 at the 2011 Census. The population at the census of 2021 was 701. At the census of 1801 the population was 798, but the boundaries may have been slightly different. The parish is immediately to the east of Sandbach, and includes Betchton Heath, a village now partly named Sandbach Heath, Hassall Green, the hamlets of Boults Green, Dean Hill, Dubthorn, Fourlanes End, Lawton Heath End and Malkin's Bank. There are numerous scattered farms and dwellings.

The parish elects 10 councillors to the parish council.

== Governance ==
Betchton civil parish was originally part of Sandbach Ancient Parish, and was created a separate parish from it in 1866. It also was part of Nantwich Hundred, Congleton Poor Law Union, Rural Sanitary District, and (after 1866) it formed part of Congleton Rural District until 1974, when it became part of the Borough of Congleton.

In terms of parliamentary representation, the Betchton area (including the period before the creation of the civil parish) was in the Cheshire, Southern Division constituency from 1832 to 1867; in the Cheshire South Division constituency from 1867 to 1885; in the Crewe division, from 1885 to 1948; from 1948 it was in Knutsford County Constituency, but it is currently in Congleton County Constituency.

== History ==
The township of Betchton, although not named in the Domesday Survey of 1086, is likely to be one of the two divisions of Eteshale referred to under Hassall which passed to the Audley family as part of the Barony of Nantwich. The Barony of Nantwich passed to Eleanor de Malbanc. Betchton was held by a family of that name. At his death in 1307-9 Mattliev de Betchton held the vill of Betchton from Thomas, son of Nicholas de Audley, by knight's service and a rent of 2s per annum.

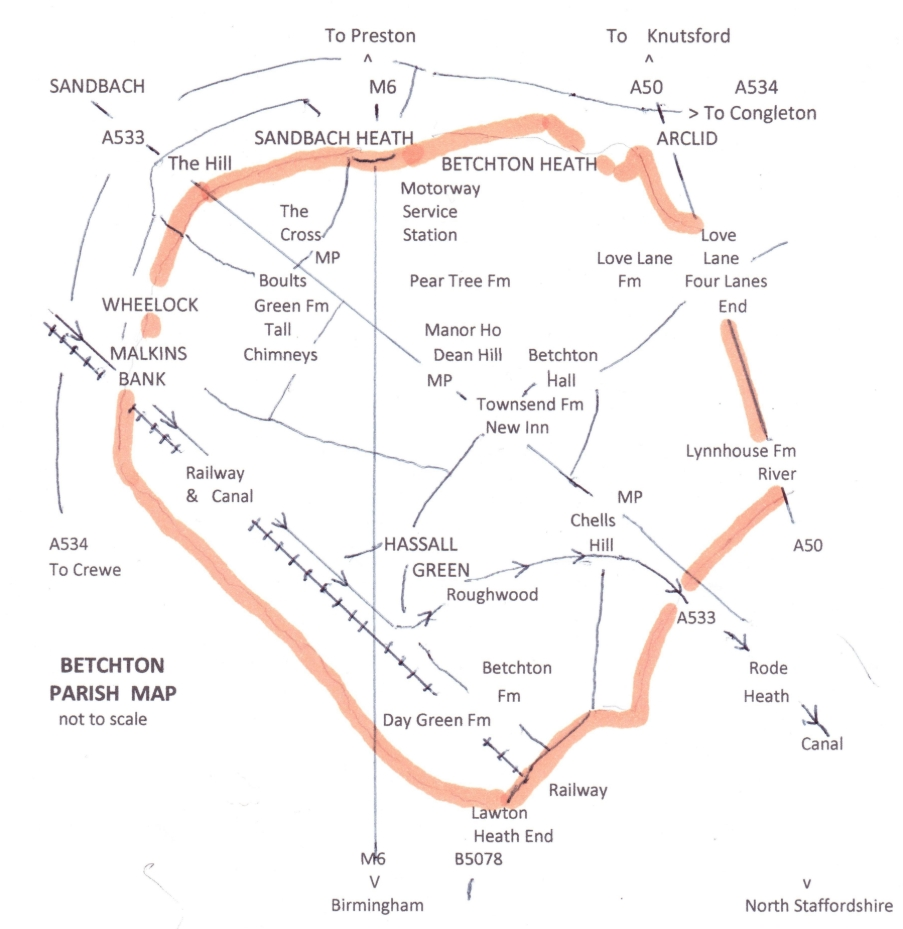
Stylised map of parish showing transport links and notable features.

== Transport ==
The web of roadways, tracks and paths in the parish came into being in earlier times to serve the cultural, agricultural and trading needs of the local population. Many are maintained and still meet these needs, but others, while having fallen into disrepair, still provide opportunities for riders and walkers.

In contrast to this ancient pattern, the A50 Trunk Road, the A533 road, the canal, the railway and the M6 motorway are all orientated north to south, being built to meet the wider national trading needs.

The A50, which skirts the east of the parish at Four Lane Ends, follows what was known in Medieval times as The Great Route to the North, the road from London to Carlyle. In 1731 the Lawton and Cranage Turnpike Trust was established to maintain the road and to collect tolls. Although nothing remains in the parish to mark the existence of the Trust, there were tollgates at Greenbank, Lawton, at Arclid, with a weighing engine, and at Holmes Chapel. A milestone remains at Brereton Green carrying the trust's name. The Chester Courant dated 30 May 1837 advertised the tolls arising from the turnpike between Lawton and Holmes Chapel were to be let by auction. The A50 remained one of the principal arteries of the road network until the building of the M6 motorway. Long stretches of the A50 were made three-lane, but these were later removed.

The A533, which begins in central Cheshire, runs south via Winsford, Middlewich and Sandbach and on into North Staffordshire. It passes through the centre of the parish with two crossroads, one at Dubthorne for Sanbach Heath and Boults Green, the other at Cappers Lane (The New Inn) for Smallwood and Hassall Green. There are three smaller junctions, Stannerhouse Lane, leading to Malkins Bank and Hassall Green; at Dean Hill, where Hood Lane follows the old road to Arclid; and one at Chells Hill for Betchton Hall and Smallwood. Thereafter the road divides for Alsager and Kidsgrove. This road was thought at one time to be on the course of King Street, the Roman Road from Warrington in Cheshire to Chesterton in North Staffordshire. However, more recent research has put the Roman road to the east of the A533, leaving Sandbach at Mill Hill Lane, crossing the stream and on through Betchton, via Malkins Bank, to Hassall and beyond. If not Roman in origin, then it must be assumed to have already been a busy artery when, in about 1788, by an Act of Parliament, the road was turnpiked and became the Spann Smithy to Talk turnpike. It was further improved in 1802 with the section running south from Dean Hill to the Cappers Lane crossroads being straightened and a new bridge built over the tributary of the River Wheelock. Brook Farm, Townsend Cottages and Townsend Farm (at that time the Sun at Noon public house) were bypassed. The Turnpike Trust built a new public house to meet the needs of travellers, called The New Inn, and beside it a toll house with a side-bar. There was another toll house and gate at Chells Hill. To the north, the turnpike joined the Spann Smithy, Booth Lane and Winsford Turnpike at Ettiley Heath, Sandbach. At Bostock, in Vale Royal, there is a milepost bearing the Trust's name. In 1946, the A533 was designated a Trunk Road, and in 1962, the road was realigned south of Dubthorne, to allow for a bridge to be built spanning the new M6 Motorway. There is no access to the Motorway but service vehicles have access here to the M6 Services. Until the Motorway took some of the heavy traffic, the A533 was a busy thoroughfare, particularly on Thursdays. In the 1950s traffic queues could stretch back a mile or more when coach loads of shoppers came to enjoy a Potteries Wakes Week day out at Sandbach Market.

The Canal

Authorised by an Act of Parliament, the 93 miles (150 km) Trent & Mersey Canal (James Brindley's "Grand Trunk") linking the Bridgewater Canal at Preston Brook with the River Trent below Shardlow was fully opened in May 1777. This was ten years after Josiah Wedgwood cut the first sod. On the four-mile stretch of canal through Betchton, between the River Wheelock aqueduct and the Church Lawton Aqueduct where the canal crosses the A50 Liverpool Road, there are fourteen locks, a further aqueduct at Chells Hill, and seventeen bridges, including one where the M6 Motorway passes over the canal. Eight structures are listed by Historic England, namely four bridges, two locks, and two mileposts. Being a narrow gauge canal, the dimensions of the locks restrict use to boats up to seven feet wide and seventy-two feet in length. The fourteen locks are part of a much longer flight where the canal ascends more than one hundred and fifty feet from Malkins Bank into North Staffordshire. The working boats, often with the family living on board, carried goods to and from the area, the trade benefitting the whole parish, especially Malkins Bank and Hassall Green. The canal's freight activity mainly involved carrying timber, coal and limestone to the thriving salt works at Malkins Bank, and taking their product away. Milk and other agricultural products were carried to the towns of Stoke-on-Trent, and stable manure transported the other way. Today it is pleasure boats that ply the canal, while the towpaths provide waterside walks.

The Railway

Built by the North Staffordshire Railway company, the line through Betchton, opened as a goods traffic only line in 1852. It is part of the six and a half mile line from Ettiley Heath to Lawton Junction. Originally there was to be a line from Liverpool to Stoke-upon-Trent, but this plan was abandoned, and the line was extended to join with the London and North Western Railway at Sandbach in 1866. As there was no station in Betchton until 1905, parishioners used Sandbach station and later, from 1893, Wheelock station. Towards the end of the 19th century a passenger service began running to Harecastle and Kidsgrove. There with just three trains each way per day, with extra services provided on Thursdays for Sandbach market, and on Saturdays. There was no Sunday service.

In 1905 a new station was opened at Hassall Green and there was a signal box and crossing gates. Hassall Green station marked the end point of a single track section from Lawton, and towards Sandbach the line was double track. The station was closed to passengers in 1930 and to freight in 1947.

Passenger service frequency on the line had been reduced in 1927, and, despite the popularity of weekend excursions to Trentham Gardens near Stoke, the passenger service ended in 1930. Following the lines closure and the line being lifted in 1971, the signal box and crossing gates were moved to Hooton in the Wirral. As with the canal, the bed of the railway has found a new use providing scenic walks such as the. Salt Line, Borrow Pit Meadows and Wheelock Rail Trail.

The M6 Motorway This dual three-lane motorway is the major road route through the parish. It is part of the 230 mile long motorway running from M6 Junction 45 at Gretna on the Scottish border to where it joins the M1 at Junction 19. The section through Betchton begins south of Junction 17, the A534 for Sandbach and Congleton, extending to north of Junction 16, the A500 for Crewe, Weston, Nantwich, Newcastle Under Lime and Stoke-on-Trent. Construction work was begun by the main contractors, Sir Lindsay Parkinson, in June 1961 and was completed in July 1963 at a cost of about six hundred thousand pounds per mile. To put this cost in perspective, the average wage for a male factory worker was £16 for a 47-hour week, with women earning considerably less. A batching plant was needed, so this and offices were built at a base site on land between the A533 and the site of the present Sandbach Services. To achieve a steady incline and to reduce the height of the embankment bridging the River Wheelock, and of the canal and road at Hassall Green, a deep cutting had to be made southward from Junction 17. The river was put to run through two culverts, backfilled above with sand from the cutting. There are just three bridges over the motorway on this stretch. The building of the motorway involved the loss of a considerable amount of productive farmland, one farm being lost completely, and two years of minor traffic disruption. It did, however, provide employment for local people and broadened people's horizons with the influx of engineers and workers from other areas. In response to the level of traffic (it is one of the busiest sections of the M6) lighting was installed and it has since been upgraded to a "smart motorway".

== Agriculture and industry ==
The parish sits on the south-eastern edge of The Cheshire Plane, being level, rich agricultural land, much of which is classified as grade 3, good to moderate. It lies in the Cheshire Brine Subsidence District. and is included in the Nitrate Vulnerable Zone designated in 2002. The flat land is cut through by several tributaries of the River Wheelock which rise on Mow Cop to the south. Regularly spaced farmsteads are surrounded by fields containing beef and dairy cows. Arable crops, such as potatoes, oilseed rape and cereals are grown. Although many of the smaller farms have gone, with their land amalgamated with others, and new methods and bigger machines are employed, what one sees is much the same farming landscape as was the case a hundred years ago. Other than potato growing, little land is now given over to vegetable production, but there is a well established rose and tree nursery at Cappers Lane. Changes in farming scale and practice, and diversification has meant that on some farms the farm building have been developed for commercial use, warehousing, transport and as dwellings. Equestrian and other leisure activities are now catered for where there were once farmsteads and farmed land. The hedgerows enclosing the fields are ancient and well established, and, though fewer in number than in former times, these hedges are dotted with mature trees, oak, ash, sycamore and the like.

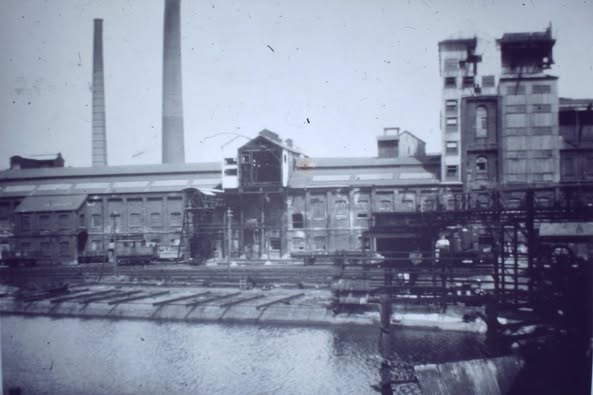
The Brunner Mond salt and chemical factory on the canal-side at Malkins Bank.

Only at Malkins Bank did the parish see large-scale industrial activity. Probably from at least Roman times, brine has been extracted and boiled so as to dry it to extract salt. Salt workers were called wallers. Over the years, the process became industrialised and by the 1870s there were three salt works at Malkins Bank; Wheelock Works, Whitehall Works and Malkins Bank Works. In 1878 the firm of Brunner Mond took over the Malkins Bank Works from Richards, Kearne and Gasquoine, and by 1880 they were manufacturing soda crystals. Salt and its by-products are the basis of many valuable chemicals and Brunner Mond grew into a substantial manufacturing centre employing hundreds. The works closed in 1932 and the factory buildings were dismantled. Brunner Mond's legacy to Malkins Bank was the ribbon of small houses and the three settlement lagoons. These lagoons were later used as a dump for chemicals and later other industrial waste. The obnoxious smell and the danger perceived led to local protests which finally came to a head in the 1960s when the lagoons caught light. The lagoons were capped and landscaped and are the site of Malkins Bank Golf Club, opened in 1976. Among other commercial enterprises nearby was Jeffies cardboard box company which operated at Malkins Bank for many years, the site is now housing.

Although there were salt workings at Hassall Green, they were never on the scale of its neighbour. James Blackwall was noted as a salt manufacturer at Hassall Green in 1864. It was Blackwall, the owner of the Whitehall salt works who built the road from Malkins Bank to Wheelock to transport his salt. There were waste lagoons at Roughwood Lane, Hassall Green associated with the salt and chemical industry. These have been capped and landscaped to provide environmental leisure facilities at Hassall Green Nature reserve.

== Public houses ==
Until early this century, Betchton had two public houses, The New Inn and The Red Lion, both are now closed, converted to dwellings and commercial use. The New Inn at Cappers Lane on the A533, and its predecessor nearby, The Noon Sun, now Townsend Farm, would have drawn custom both from the local district and from travellers on the A533. The other house, The Red Lion was on Betchton Lane at Hassall Green. The name of The Red Lion was changed to The Romping Donkey following an incident when a local took his donkey into the pub for a drink.

There were numbers of pubs just outside the parish. On the parish boundary with Smallwood on the A50 at Four Lanes End are The Bulls Head and The Salamanca (now closed). And, a little further to the north, The Legs of Man at Arclid. Further south there was The Horseshoe and The Lawton Arms at Church Lawton, and The Broughton Arms at Rode Heath. On the parish boundary with Sandbach, at The Hill, was The Travellers Rest, now rebuilt and called The Sandpiper. There is no pub at Malkins Bank, but at Wheelock are the Commercial and The Nags Head, both now closed, and The Cheshire Cheese.

== Built environment ==
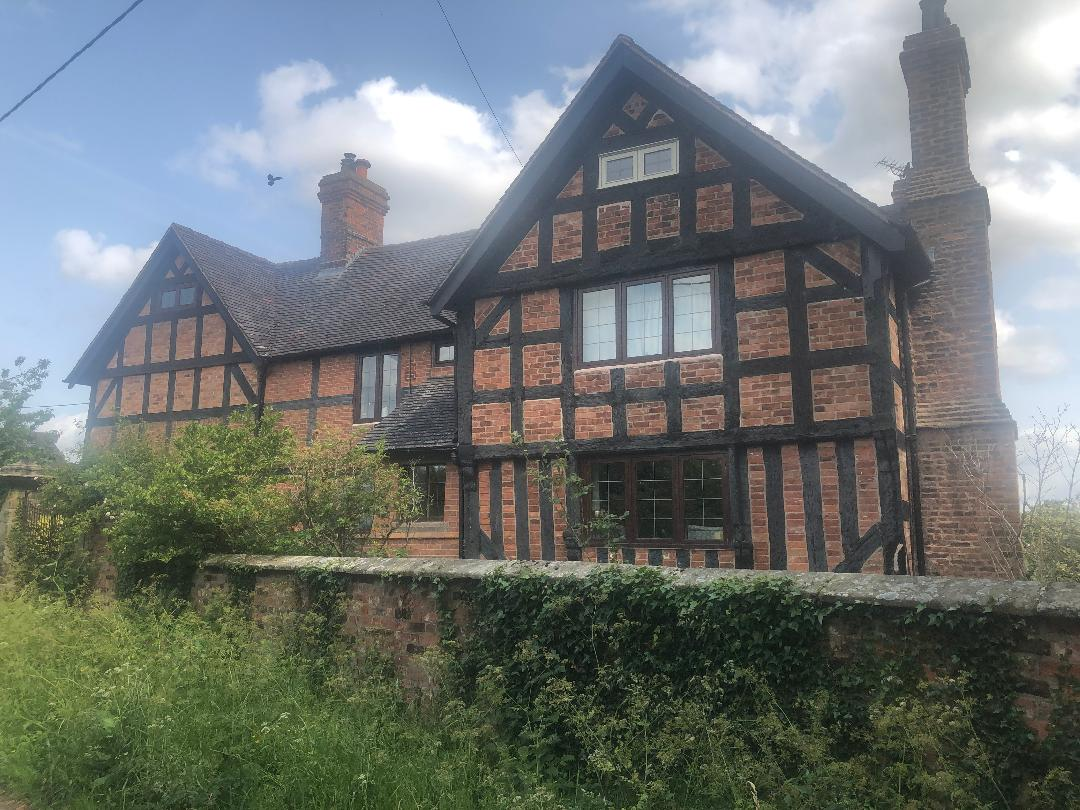
Boults Green Farmhouse looking south from Colley Lane

Among the Listed Buildings in Betchton are seven half-timbered farm houses dating from the sixteenth and seventeenth century, but for the greater part Betchton farm houses are of a later date. These are sturdy, two storey structures with few architectural or decorative features. They are built of a mellow, red-brown brick below a tiled roof, with the accompanying farm buildings mirroring the farm house in form and materials. Built in the eighteenth and nineteenth century, they probably replaced earlier dwellings on the same sites. The building of these farmsteads, representing a substantial investment, reflected a confidence in the future of farming. It is suggested that during The Agricultural Revolution yields per acre doubled between 1650 and 1850, and productivity per agricultural worker increased two and a half fold.

In many cases there have been later additions to the original farm buildings. There are Dutch barns with curved galvanised, corrugated-iron roofs used for the storage of hay and straw, and, built since the Second World War, large pitched-roof buildings for livestock. These are of either galvanised iron or of corrugated asbestos, often with the sides fully enclosed with timber cladding. Silage storage and more intensive stocking has necessitated the laying of concrete yards.

Associated with farming or other local enterprises are the occasional small terraces built to provide homes for workers, and sometimes a second dwelling built alongside or near the farm. These are where farmers have built bungalows and houses for their retirement. Examples can be found in the bungalow at Chells Hill and The Grove House at Boults Green on the A533.

Opposite The Grove, on the A533 there are a number of large detached properties built at various times over the last century, mainly by tradespeople from Sandbach.

For many years the largest and most impressive house in the parish was Betchton Hall, also called Betchton House. Set back a little way from the road, it is a rebuilding of an older half timbered country house, built in brick with stone dressings beneath a slate roof. Built in the sixteenth century, it was extended in the early 19th century with some of the original timber-framing being retained. The house, on two storeys, has a seven-bay frontage with a central arched doorway, and Venetion windows on the south west elevation. The File Brook, which joins the River Wheelock, runs alongside and crosses Love Lane at this point. Betchton Hall Farm stands nearby.

The Leverage family lived at Betchton House till the seventeenth century when it passed to the Galley family who adopted the name Jackson. It was Richard Jackson, Prebendary of Chester who had the Hall substantially rebuilt in the 18th century. In the early years of the following century it was extended for Richard Galley. Joseph Hilditch and his son, Brian are recorded as living in the Hall in the early eighteen hundreds. A Captain Davies Bunton is recorded as residing there in 1906, and more recently the family of Sidney Vaughan Gaskell lived at the Hall.

Betchton Hall's position as the pre-eminent property in the parish has now been eclipsed by the re-development of Roughwood Hill Farm, the house and buildings of which have been replaced by a modern mansion set in its own estate. In 2019 an archaeological report was completed on the site and on the former buildings. Following this, the architectural designers, Foster and Partners, designed a modern mansion for Denise Coates and her family. The property reportedly features an Olympic size swimming pool, an artificial lake with boat house, tennis courts, stables, ornamental gardens and workers’ cottages, all set behind security fences. The estate is valued at over £90 million and stands on a 52-acre (21 ha) site.

Almost out of sight, at the end of Vicarage Lane at Boults Green stands Tall Chimneys, a Gothic Revival building designed by George Gilbert Scott, the architect who also oversaw work on Sandbach Church and designed Sandbach Heath Church and other buildings in Sandbach. Tall Chimneys was built in 1848 as a vicarage for John Armitstead, the then vicar of Sandbach. The land around the house was formerly well wooded parkland, but, according to Cyril Massey the parkland has lost much of its charm. The house, no longer a vicarage, was divided into flats in the middle of the last century.

The coming of the canal left Malkins Bank and Hassall Green with an architectural heritage of bridges and locks, and, at both, a ribbon of small cottages and some industrial buildings. Lock 57 at Hassall Green, and the associated buildings provide just one example of this. Four canal bridges, three locks and two milestones have listed status. For the most part the North Staffordshire Railway left little of architectural interest, the lines being lifted in 1971, and the signal box and gates having been removed and re-erected at Hadlow Road Railway Station, Willaston in the Wirral. Only Hassall Green station building, opened in 1905, remains, now an attractive roadside dwelling.

During the last century Council Houses were built at Malkins Bank and at Charles Square, Hassall Green, and there has been further private development in these centres, mainly on brown field sites. Otherwise, there has been little in the way of new housing in the parish in recent times.

Perhaps the most intriguing building in the parish is St Philip's Church on New Inn Lane, Hassall Green, a church in the diocese of Chester. The building, constructed in corrugated galvanised iron, is popularly referred to as the Tin tabernacle. Dating from the early 1889s, the building had originally stood on Crewe Road, Alsager until replaced by the permanent Church of St Mary Magdalene. The Tin-tabernacle was purchased for £150 (equivalent to £22,000 in 2023), and moved to Hassall Green. The church is painted pink with white bargeboards. The authors of the Buildings of England series describe it as a "candyfloss-pink tin tabernacle".

There were water mills at Roughwood. but these no longer operate.

There was a petrol filling station at Cappers Lane, but since this closed there is no filling station in the parish. At various times there have been village shops at Malkins Bank, at Hassall Green and at Cappers Lane, but, while the properties remain, the shops are long since closed. Up until the 1960s the Co-op operated a mobile shop which visited the various communities.

== World War I and World War II ==
Men were lost to both these wars, their loss marked in the churches that serve the parish and on the war memorial at Sandbach. Among those recorded on the war memorial are ten men who had worked for Brunner Monde at Malkins Bank, killed in World War I. They were among the 128 men encouraged to sign up by Brunner Monde's offer of half pay for as long as they were enlisted. Women had always worked alongside men in the salt industry, and more stepped in to replace the men away at war.

At Hassall Green there is a small brick building, the only visible remains of Q102A, a dummy airfield with landing lights to distract German Bombers looking to find Cranage airfield, 8 miles to the north. It was manned by a small unit from 1941 to 1943.

== Betchton Royalty ==
The Betchton Royalty, or The Freeholders of the Manor of Betchton, is an entity which came into being in 1602 when Thomas Egerton, and his son John, sold part of the Manor of Betchton to the Betchton freeholders, John Wheelock, Richard Shaw, William Shaw and Hugh Furnival. Hugh Furnival was likely the owner of Boults Green Farm at that time. These freeholders held common right to graze and to cut turf on Betchton Heath, Sandbach Heath. The land was later enclosed, roads made and two farmsteads built. The Betchton Royalty is held in perpetuity and the land can not be sold. The rent from this land is still paid to the successors of the original freeholders.

== See also ==
- Listed buildings in Betchton
- Betchton Hall
- Boults Green Farm

== Bibliography ==
- Youngs, F. A. (1991). Guide to the Local Administrative Units of England. Volume I: Northern England. London: Royal Historical Society. ISBN 0-86193-127-0.
