= Betchton Hall =

Country house in Betchton, Cheshire, England

Coordinates: 53.12855°N 2.30914°W

Betchton Hall is a country house in the parish of Betchton, Cheshire, England. It was originally a timber-framed house, and was substantially rebuilt in brick in the 18th century for Richard Jackson, prebendary of Chester. In the early years of the following century it was extended for Richard Galley. The house is in two storeys. The southeast front has seven bays that include a round-headed doorway. The southwest front has three bays, and contains Venetian windows. The entrance hall is circular. In the house is an 18th-century fireplace moved from Faringdon House, then in Berkshire and now in Oxfordshire, in the 1960s. The house is recorded in the National Heritage List for England as a designated Grade II listed building.

== See also ==
- Listed buildings in Betchton
