= Boults Green Farm =

Grade I listed farmhose and curtilage in Cheshire

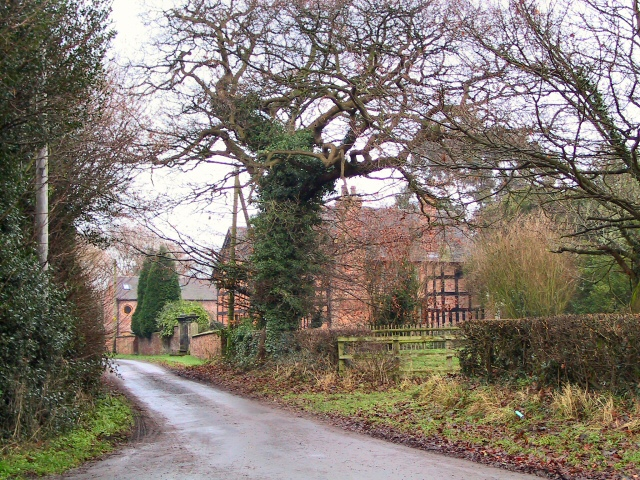

- Location within Cheshire
- Country: United Kingdom
- Coordinates: 53.1358°N 2.3462°W
- Established: 17th century

Boults Green Farm is one of three farms which, along with a vicarage and several private dwellings, make up the hamlet of Boults Green in the parish of Betchton in Cheshire. The Grade II listed, half-timbered farmhouse and the Grade II listed, half-timbered barn date from the mid-sixteenth century.

== The hamlet of Boults Green ==
The hamlet is a small, loosely defined area of land, lying east of the A533, on either side of Colley Lane (part of which is now called Vicarage Lane) from the Dubthorn crossroads, to the point where the lane, on its route to Sandbach and Malkins Bank, crosses the Drumber stream, a tributary of the River Wheelock. To the west the area is bordered by this small river, and to the south-east it is now bordered by the M6 Motorway.

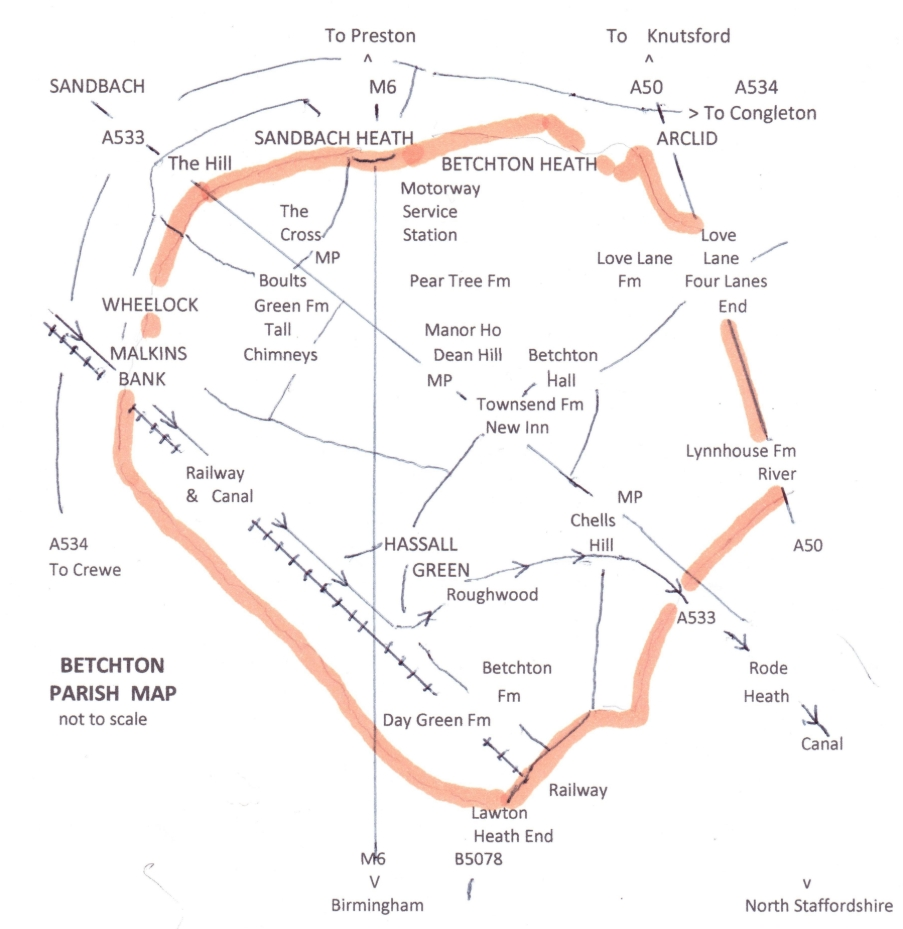
Stylised map of parish showing transport links and notable features.

Boults Green consists of three farms; Cross Farm, Vicarage Farm, formerly called Stanway House, which is said by Massey to have been built on the actual Boults Green, and Boults Green Farm, referred to in the past as Boults Green House. There is also the Vicarage and a handful of dwellings. The whole extends in total to less than three hundred acres. There has been an average population of 35 recorded on the ten census returns since 1841. The population was at its highest in 1891 when the hamlet had fifty-four inhabitants. The vicarage, called Tall Chimneys, built in 1848, is now divided into several apartments. The farmland of these three farms is latterly used mainly for equestrian, or let to farmers from outside the hamlet.

== History of Boults Green Farm ==
In an agreement of the 30th April 1647, Thomas Moulson of London conveyed to his uncle, William Leversage, the elder, of Wheelock, Esq. a farm called Bolts Farm in Betchton.

On the first fly-leaf of Vol II of the Sandbach church register of baptisms, marriages and burials 1699 - 1764 there is a memorandum, being a note of the sermons still to be preached in the parish Church of Sandbach which includes the following:

April 26. Parrott's Sermon, paid from Bolt's Green. Minister £2 0. Clerk 10s. In 1886 Earwaker saw a framed copy of this paper hanging in the church vestry.

== Boults Green Farm main house ==
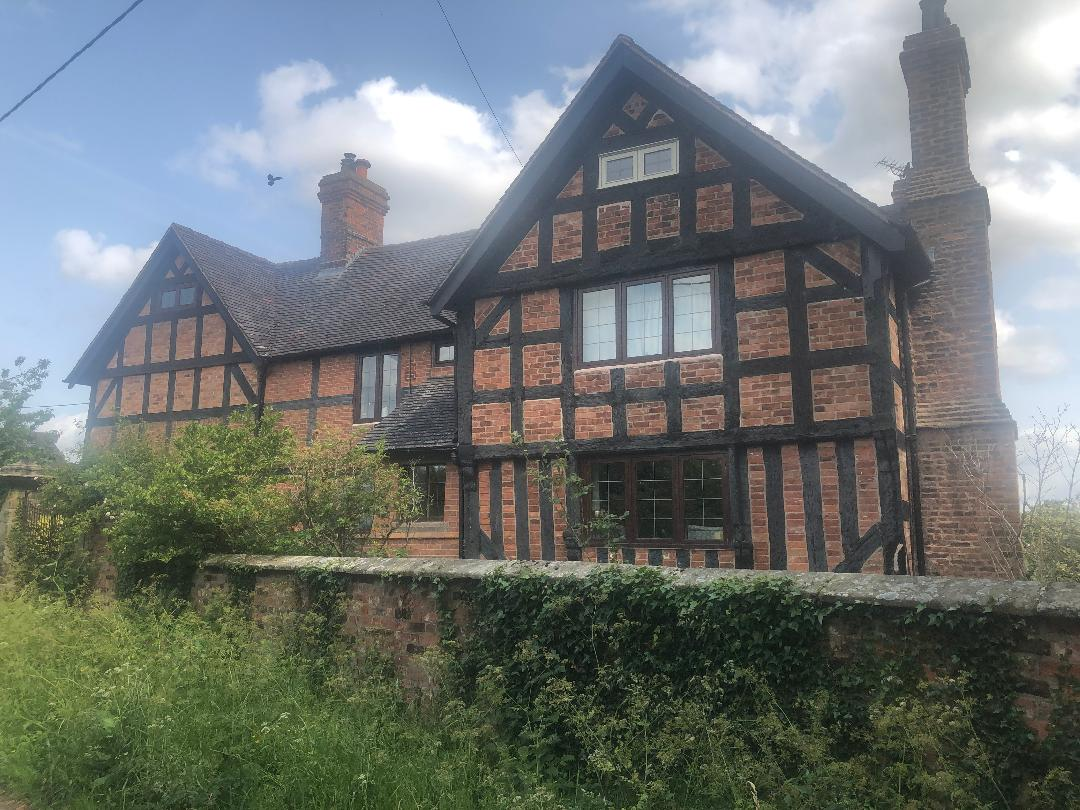
Boults Green Farmhouse looking south from Colley Lane

Thought to have been built in the mid sixteenth century, the Grade II listed, cruck- framed, half-timbered house forms a 'T' shape, with its jettied wing facing north-westerly. The five ground floor rooms and five first floor bedrooms are served by a winding oak stairway extending from a small cellar to the attics above. Formerly of oak with leaded panes, the original windows are lost, replaced by modern casements. The original wattle and daub between the timbers has been replaced by brick infill, and where little or no timber remains it is replicated on the brickwork in black paint. The roof is of blue-black tile and painted barge boards. Brick-built chimneys provided flues for open fires in all rooms on both floors, and to the cellar. To the road frontage is a wall in matching brick through which stone steps lead to a gateway with brick and stone pillars. Once topped by round stone balls, the gate pillars are grade II listed. The higher part of this wall formed the rear wall of two pig sties, brick built with flagstone roof.

In the late nineteenth or early twentieth century a brick extension was added to the rear to provide two extra rooms on each floor and a further flight of stairs. A small brick porch was added to the front.

At a similar period a brick and tile dairy with wash house was built. This building, along with the house, the pig sty and the end of the half-timbered barn enclose a small yard with a well where a hand pump formerly stood providing water for the house and dairy.

== Boults Green Farm buildings ==
A Grade II listed, two-storey, half-timbered barn of the same era and style as the house is set at an angle to Colley Lane. Again, most of the wattle and daub has been replaced by brick infill. Differences in the design of sections of the infill suggest these were done at different times. The barn provided two cart sheds with double doors, a meal house, a shippon (byre) for six and a loose box. Pitching holes to front and rear gave access for storage on the upper floor. At the northern end a set of stone steps to provide access to a grain store, and, below the steps, a dog kennel.

The roof is of tile to the front (the north-east), and of large random stone flags to the rear (the south west). The building has tilted, leaving the roof angle far steeper at the front than the rear.

In the nineteenth or early twentieth century a brick and tile extension was added to the southern end with shippon and store at ground level and loft above. At the rear, with access to the meal-house, a single-storey engine house of brick and slate was added to house a petrol engine and electric motor to power a vacuum milking machine and lineshaft. The lineshaft powered a grain grinder, a straw chopper and a root pulper. Vacuum pipes were installed to the shippons. There were indications of a horse gin-circle existing here before the engine house was built. A later addition, set against the wall of the steps, was a small lean-to store built of brick and roofed with tile. A Galvanised iron lean-to shed for implement storage was erected against the rear wall of the half-timbered barn. Now removed.

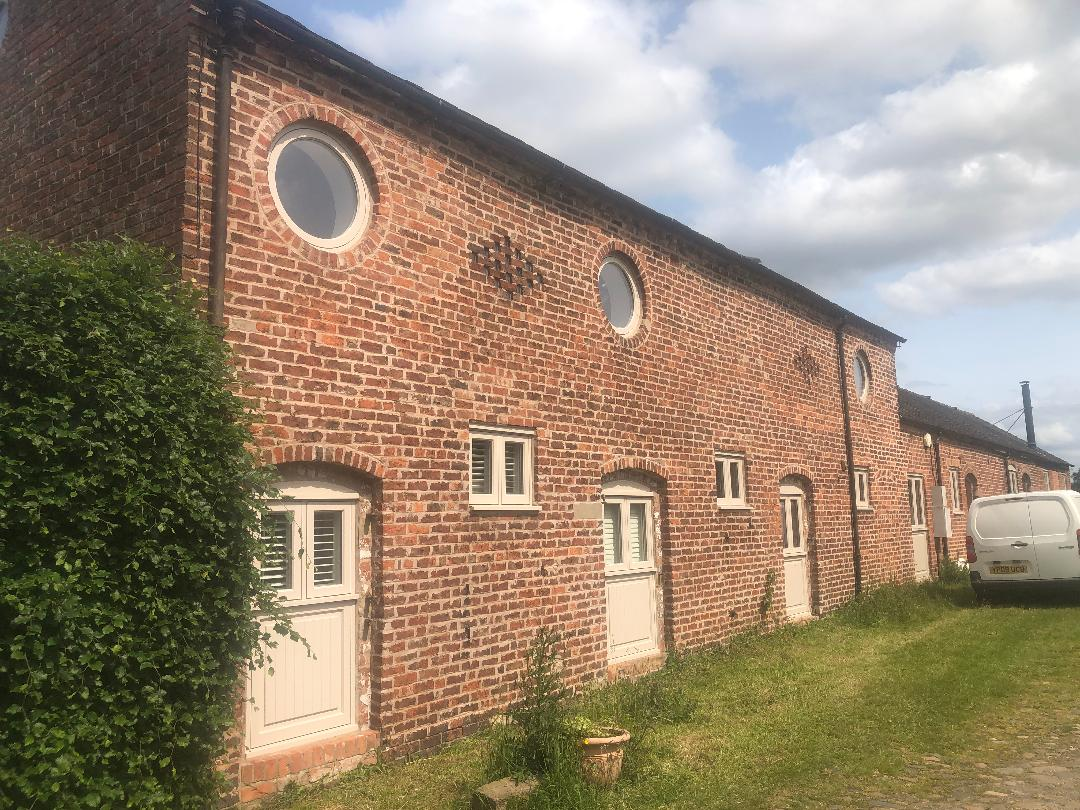
Shippon block at Boults Green Farm after conversion to dwelling.

Again in the nineteenth or early twentieth century, a brick and tile-roofed building was erected at right angle to Colley Lane. This new building provided a bull pen, a stable for three horses and shippons with stalls for thirty-six milking cows. Part is single storey, part with storage loft above with round pitching holes. This may have replaced an earlier building on this site. Together with the existing half-timbered barn, pig sty and wall, the new building enclosed the triangular farmyard, part of which retains the cobbled surface, possibly as old as the original barn. Now converted to a dwelling.

At a later date a four-bay Cheshire barn was erected with brick uprights and tiled roof, providing a grain store and storage for hay and straw. Alongside a galvanised iron roofed Dutch barn.

To the west of the house, in the field called the Kiln Yard, stood a two-storey building of brick and tile, the tile roof later replaced by galvanised iron. The style and bricks matched none in the other buildings. It does not appear on the 1841 tithe map and was removed in the 1980s. Alongside was a timber building housing laying hens in cages built in the early 1960s (now removed), and a potato store built of curved, corrugated asbestos sheets.

In 1955, two coke-fired glasshouses were erected to the south of the house (now removed), and a number of poultry houses stood in the two orchards to house free range laying hens.

1955 saw the beginning of the last chapter of Boults Green farm as a working family-farm. At that time, the farm buildings could house a milking herd of up to forty-two cows, three working horses, a number of young cattle and poultry, and stys for two sows with their litters. There was storage space sufficient for the hay, straw and the grain the farm produced without need of outside ricks. Tractors and farm implements could be stored under cover.

== The farmland, geology and soil ==
The farmland, lying to the south of the house, straddling Stannerhouse Lane, and to the west of Colley Lane, is recorded over time as being between 100 and 120 acres.

Throughout Cheshire are found glacial deposits. The passage of streams and rivers has cut through these deposits in the post-glacial period, and there is an accumulation of alluvium. The farm lies in the Cheshire Brine Subsidence District. Salt and brine are found beneath much of the county, the first borings at Malkins Bank, Betchton being made in 1692. The farm is included in the Nitrate Vulneral Zone designated in 2002. Like much of the Cheshire Plain, the soil of Boults Green is classified as grade 3, good to moderate. The soil is a light, friable loam over a mainly sand subsoil with occasional pockets of boulder clay. Fox bench is found and occasional small deposits of iron pyrites (FeS2) or fool's gold. The soil is slightly acid, free draining, but liable to capping, and to the development of ploughing pan if worked while wet. It is suitable for grassland and the growing of most arable crops.

The two watercourses, surface ditches, ponds and the outlets from field drains provided drinking water for stock in many fields. The result of small scale sand extraction and, possibly as a result of brine subsidence, the farm has several sand-holes, dry hollows and sunken features. Those ponds holding water were clay lined. In 1962, five ponds and hollows were filled with spoil from the building of the M6 motorway. Over the years, others have become clogged with sand carried down by drains.

Boults Green's light soil and sand holes provide an ideal habitat for rabbits. Until the early 1950s, when they were virtually wiped out by myxomatosis, rabbits presented a serious problem, eating grass, cereals and vegetable crops. Their warrens, undermining open ground, were a danger to grazing and draught animals, and a hazard to vehicles.

In 1955, three-quarters of Boults Green Farm was permanent pasture, in some of which remained ridge and furrow features. These are known in Cheshire dialect as but and reean, or cop and reean. Crop rotation had been practised on the remainder of the land. After 1955 the area of arable was increased with the introduction of a range of root and vegetable crops, while the milking herd was reduced to thirty-six. The ridge and furrows were ploughed out.

== Identification: Farm and road names ==
The A533. This road bordering the farm follows the route of the Spann Smithy to Talk Turnpike Road, built about 1788 and improved in 1802.

Boults Green Farm, also known as Bolts Green Farm or Boults Green House. Various suggestions are made as to the etymology and origin of the name of the hamlet. The most likely is that a person named Boult, Bolt or Butt owned or lived here in the unrecorded past. The surname Boult is thought to have originated in Auvergne in France. Boult may have been a local surname since a Sarah Boult, née Berrington, is recorded as having died 19 May 1761 at Creswallshaw in Betchton parish. Or, Bolt may come from the Anglo-Saxon word, bold, meaning a small farm. Or, it may be connected with bolt, being another name for an arrow, perhaps arrows having been made here, or archery practised here. Also, butt, as in the place where archery is practised. The Middle English word "butt" referred to an abutting strip of land, and is often associated with mediaeval field systems. In Cheshire "Green" in rural place names often referred to a level farmed area, as opposed to forest, woodland, heath, moss or river meadow.

Colley Lane. Of uncertain origin, a person named Colley may have lived here. Colley or Colly can mean dark, black, or to blacken. This narrow lane that twists down to the Drumber Brook was, perhaps, once through dense woodland with a muddy crossing of the Drumber, giving rise to the name of the lane.

The Drumber Brook. Rising on Betchton Heath (Now Sandbach Heath), this small stream which skirts two fields, joins the River Wheelock. The name probably comes from drumble, a wooded ravine. In 1750 Drumber Farm, which stands beside the stream, was called Drumble Farm.

Stannerhouse Lane. Running from the A533 to Malkins Bank, there are no buildings on the lane and no trace of a Stanner or Stannier House has been found. No record of a Stanner or Stannier family has been found. However, Vicarage Farm was previously called Stanway House and a pathway runs through its land down to the lane and a bridge over the River Wheelock. No explanation is readily available as to why Stanway House was so called. Stannum is Latin for tin (Sn), and it is interesting that two of Boults Green Farm fields alongside the lane were named Tin Field and Tin Meadow. Also, that the field where the lane meets the A533 was called Smithy Field. This could indicate a tinsmith operating here, possibly serving the needs of the salt industry in Malkins Bank and Sandbach. Stanwaie House and Stanwaie House Bridge are mentioned in the Sandbach Register and in the Betchton Court Rolls of 1681. The bridge, but not necessarily the house, must have been on the lane, perhaps then known as Stanners House Lane.

The Vicarage. In the 1800s, the architect, George Gilbert Scott designed the new vicarage, now called Tall Chimneys. Following the construction, the section of Colley Lane from Dubthorn Crossroads to the vicarage entrance became known as Vicarage Lane.

=== Field names ===
Cheshire Tithe Map Grid reference SJ780 604 Map Ref EDT44/2 Betchton

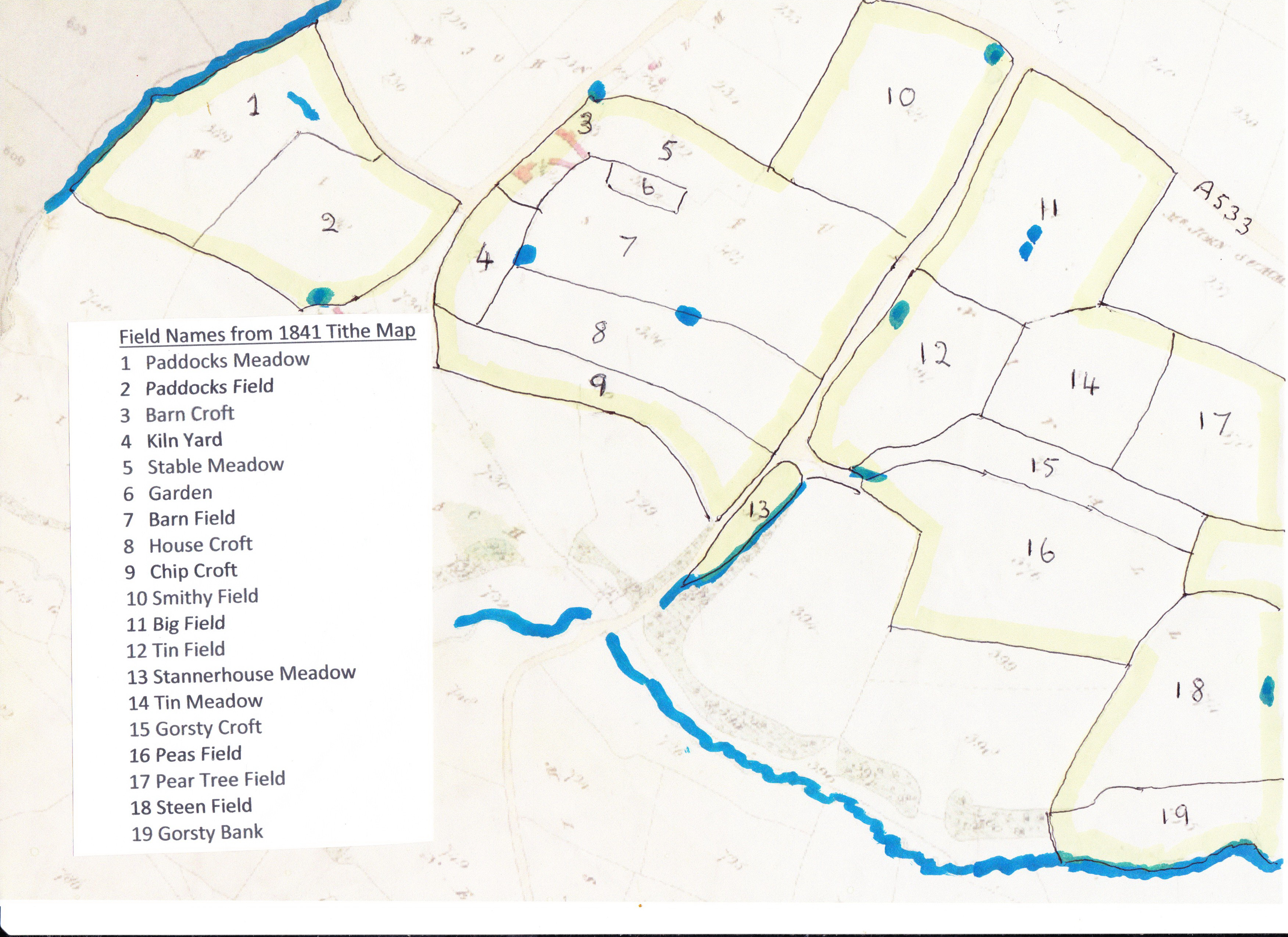
Boults Green Farm Field Names From 1841 Tithe Map

Barn Croft. Close to the barn. Croft refers to an enclosed field.

Big Field. This was not the largest field on the farm at that time. There are no traces to suggest a medieval field system or of strip farming at Boults Green, unless Big Field was part of a much larger field once farmed in strips.

Chip Croft. Probably the name represented the long thin shape of this field. Later it became part of Barn Croft.

Garden. Later referred to as The Orchard, this small field is enclosed by hedges in which mature apple, damson, plum and pear trees grew.

Gorsty Bank. South facing, the steep valley side to the River Wheelock still grows a thick covering of Gorse. In 1962 spoil from the M6 Motorway was deposited on the south side of Steen Field and onto Gorsty Bank.

Gorsty Croft. No gorse has grown on this area in living memory. At some point after 1841, boundaries were moved and new hedges were planted with this long thin field being incorporated into adjoining fields. An oak tree, the last remnant of the original boundary, was felled in the early 1960s.

Kiln Yard. Although no remains of a kiln have been found, it was common practice for bricks to be produced on site for building projects. Often, lime kilns were built to facilitate limestone being heated to produce lime for building or for application to the land. Containing numbers of mature fruit trees, Kiln Yard was later called Big Orchard.

Paddocks Field and Paddocks Meadow. Presumably Paddock was a previous owner or occupier. Paddocks Field slopes gently and is easily tilled, while Paddocks Meadow slopes more steeply, making it better suited to grazing.

Pear Tree Field. Having no pear trees in living memory, the name probably comes from closeness to Pear Tree Farm to the south east where an orchard of twenty or more mature King Pear trees grew until felled in the 1960s.

Peas Field. Pea, bean and clover crops were grown as cattle feed. As these crops fix nitrogen from the atmosphere, they provide a valuable fertiliser.

Smithy Field. Some brick foundation beside the junction of Stannerhouse Lane and the A533 suggest a building once stood here. The foundations and a small, tree-lined pond were covered over in 1962 when the road was realigned as part of the building of the M6 Motorway. (See Stannerhouse Lane) in about 1930, a previous owner of Boults Green Farm, Herbert Thorley, built a new house called The Grove on the northern corner of the field.

Steen Field. Steen can mean stone, but the soil here is light loam and no marker stones are evident. A misspelling of stean, may have indicated a brick-lined stean or well to provide water for animals.

Tin Field. - See Stannerhouse Lane.

Tin Meadow. - See Stannerhouse Lane.

== Boults Green Farm and the Betchton Royalty ==
The Betchton Royalty, or The Freeholders of the Manor of Betchton, is an entity which came into being in 1602 when Thomas Egerton, and his son John, sold part of the Manor of Betchton to the Betchton freeholders, John Wheelock, Richard Shaw, William Shaw and Hugh Furnival. Hugh Furnival was likely the owner of Boults Green Farm at that time. The land, over which they had common right to graze and to cut turf on Sandbach Heath was later enclosed, roads made and two farmsteads built.

From the Betchton Royalty, the owners of Boults Green Farm receive a part share of the rents from these two farms and some other land in the parish. They also pay to the Royalty a small rent for a sand hole adjoining Stannerhouse Meadow. The benefit from The Betchton Royalty accruing to what was once one farm called Boults Green Farm is now divided between the several owners
