= Christ Church, Alsager =

Coordinates: 53.0978°N 2.3168°W

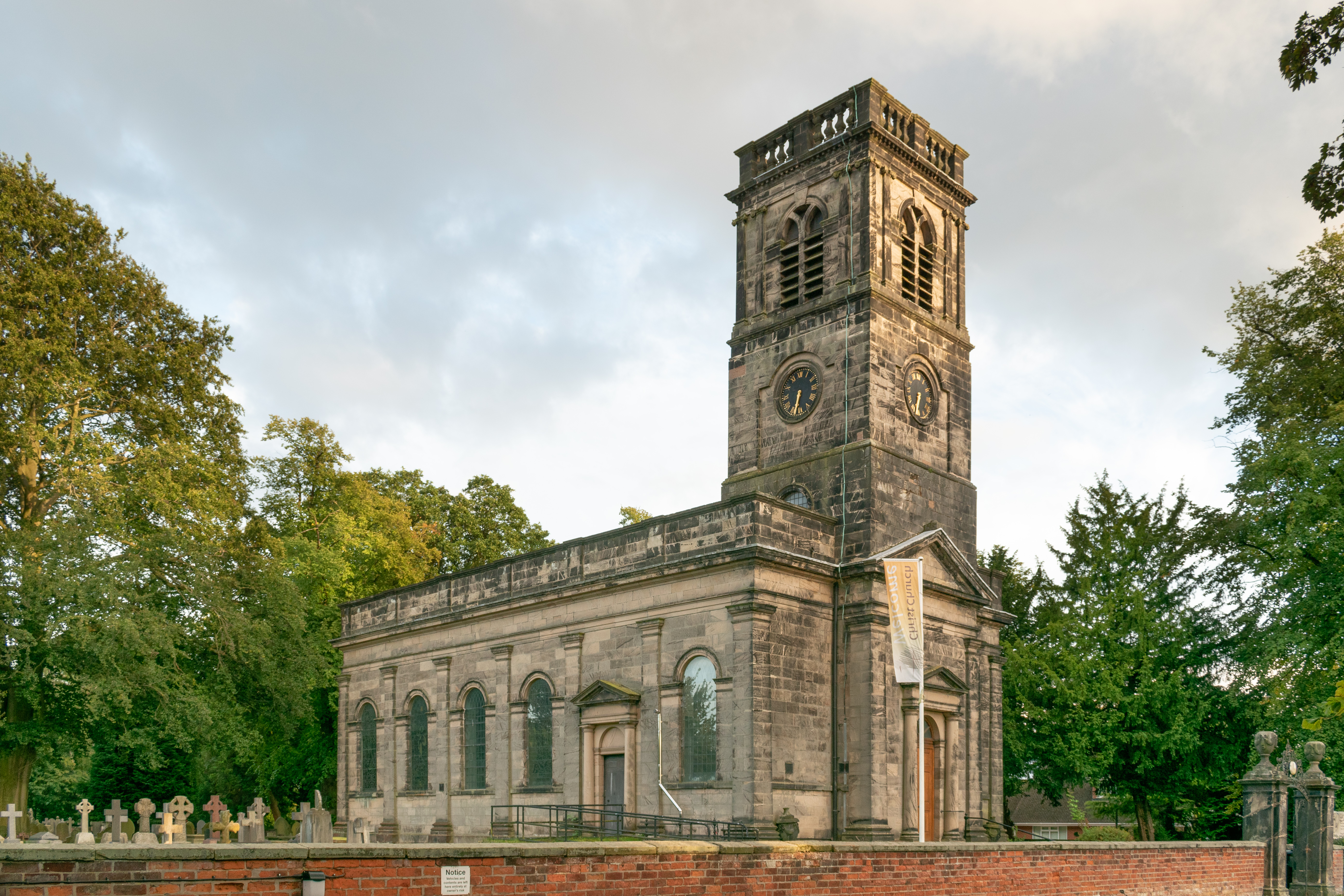

- Location in Cheshire
- OS grid reference: SJ 789 556
- Location: Alsager, Cheshire
- Country: England
- Denomination: Anglican
- Website: www.christchurchalsager.uk

History
- Status: Parish church

Architecture
- Functional status: Active
- Heritage designation: Grade II*
- Designated: 26 March 1987
- Architect: Thomas Stringer
- Architectural type: Church
- Style: Georgian
- Groundbreaking: 1789
- Completed: 1790

Specifications
- Materials: Ashlar yellow Keuper sandstone

Administration
- Province: York
- Diocese: Chester
- Archdeaconry: Macclesfield
- Deanery: Congleton
- Parish: Christ Church, Alsager

Clergy
- Vicar: Rev Daran Ward

Christ Church Alsager is in the town of Alsager, Cheshire, England. Its mission is to love God and to love others. Christ Church Alsager provides activities for all ages including children, youth and the elderly, as well as worship services on Sundays and midweek, weddings, baptisms and funerals.

It is recorded in the National Heritage List for England as a designated Grade II* listed building. It is an active Anglican parish church in the diocese of Chester, the archdeaconry of Macclesfield and the deanery of Congleton.

== History ==
Barthomley Church, Chester Act 1789
- Act of Parliament
- Parliament of Great Britain
- Long title: An Act to enable Mary Alsager, Margaret Alsager, and Judith Alsager, to finish and complete a new Church or Chapel, in the Parish of Barthomley, in the County of Chester, and to endow the same; and to establish a Charity School within the said Parish, and vesting the Right of Presentation to the said Church or Chapel, in them and the future Lords and Ladies of the Manor of Alsager, within the said County.
- Citation: 29 Geo. 3. c. 11
- Territorial extent: Great Britain

Dates
- Royal assent: 8 April 1789
- Commencement: 20 November 1788 (Note: Start of session.)

Status: Current legislation

Text of statute as originally enacted

The church was built in 1789–90 at the expense of three "Ladies of the Manor of Alsager", Mary, Margaret and Judith Alsager, to a design by Thomas Stringer. It was a chapel of ease to St Bertoline's Church, Barthomley, and became a parish church in 1946. To celebrate the centenary of the church a new organ was acquired and dedicated in 1889.

== Architecture ==
=== Exterior ===
The church is built in ashlar yellow Keuper sandstone in Georgian style. Its plan consists of a west tower, a six-bay nave and a three-bay chancel with an apse. At the sides of the west door are Tuscan demi-columns supporting a frieze and a pediment which has an acroterion block at its top. Above this the tower has a clock stage with a clock face on each side, and a belfry stage with louvred bell-openings on each side. At the top of the tower is a dentilled cornice and a balustrade. The windows at the sides of the church are round-headed. The bays are separated by giant pilasters.

=== Interior ===
Inside the church is a west gallery carried on Doric columns. The gallery is panelled, as are the nave and chancel to dado height. In the chancel the panelling is divided by fluted pilasters. The font is an 18th-century baluster with an octagonal bowl. The stained glass windows depict the Apostles, and were created by different studios at different times. On the south side of the church is a window depicting Saint Paul by Jones and Willis, dating from 1907, and two from about 1952 by T. F. Wilford. On the north side of the church is a window depicting Saint Luke, dating from 1924. by William Morris of Westminster. On the south side is a window depicting Saint Mark, dating from 1952, attributed to Donald Brook. There are more windows, dating probably from the early 20th century, that are unsigned. Also in the church are three plaques to the memory of the five "Ladies of the Manor of Alsager". The parish registers begin in 1789 for baptisms and burials and in 1852 for marriages. The organ was built by Stringer and Company, and was rebuilt in 1990 by Ward and Smith. The tower contains a ring of eight bells, hung for change ringing, six of which date to 1893, and the others to 1902, all cast by John Taylor & Co of Loughborough.

== External features ==
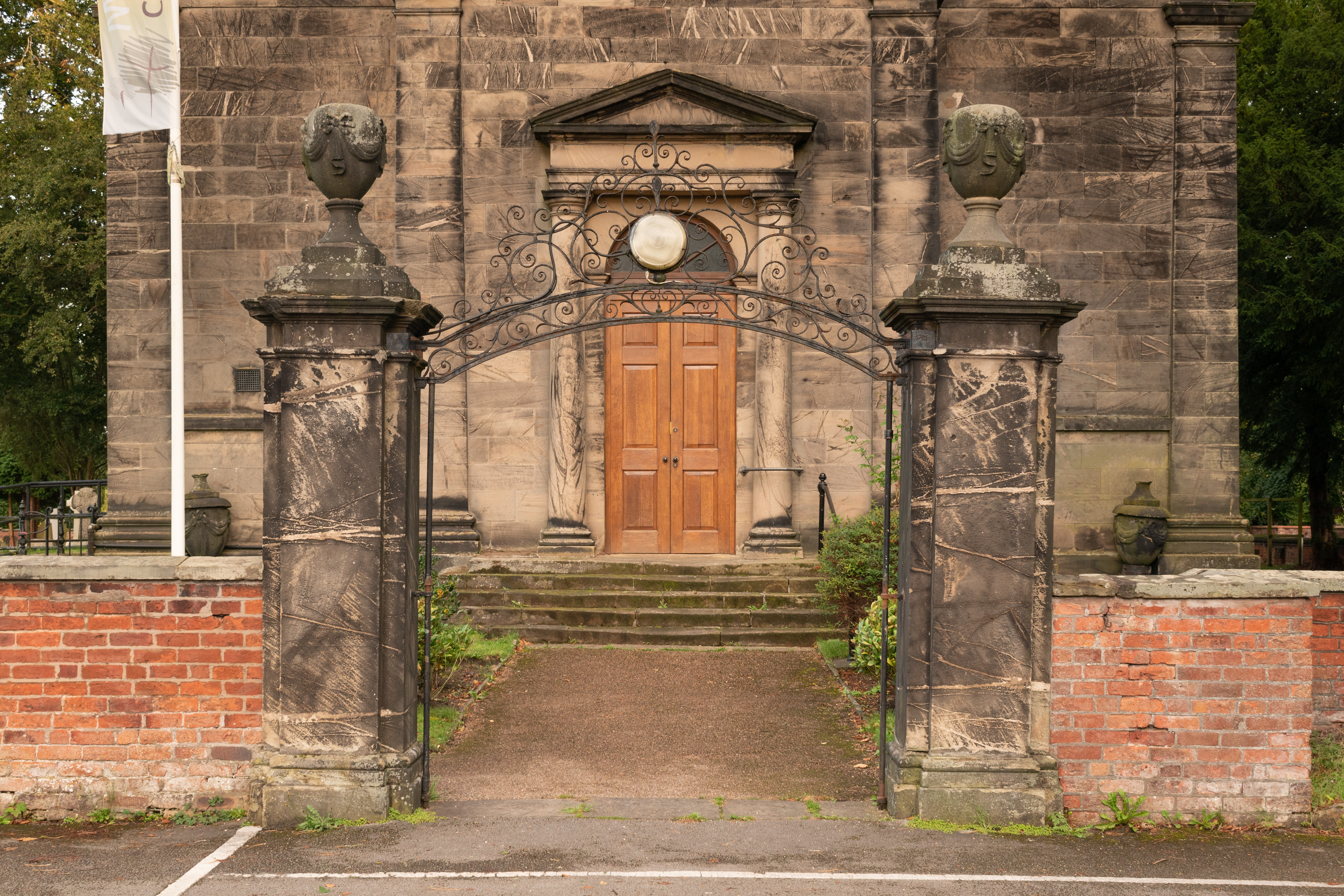
Grade II listed gate piers

Outside the church is a pair of gate piers in yellow sandstone by Thomas Stringer dating from around 1790. On top of the piers are vase finials standing on a stepped base. These are listed at Grade II. The churchyard contains the war graves of eight British servicemen, six from World War I and two from World War II.

== See also ==
- Grade II* listed buildings in Cheshire East
- Listed buildings in Alsager
