= Listed buildings in Alsager =

Alsager is a civil parish in Cheshire East, England. It contains eight buildings that are recorded in the National Heritage List for England as designated listed buildings. Of these, one is listed at Grade II*, the middle grade, and the others are at Grade II. The parish is mainly occupied by the town of Alsager, with some surrounding countryside. The listed buildings include two churches and associated structures, a school and master's house, town houses, farmhouses, and a war memorial

== Key ==
| Grade | Criteria |
|---|---|
| II* | Particularly important buildings of more than special interest |
| II | Buildings of national importance and special interest |

== Buildings ==
| Name and location | Photograph | Date | Notes | Grade |
|---|---|---|---|---|
| Bank Farmhouse; 53.08778°N 2.29568°W | — | Early 17th century | The farmhouse is timber-framed with rendered brick infill and a tiled roof. It is in two storeys, and has a later projecting wing on the left. At the right of the entrance front is a door and a bow window. The other windows are casements. | II |
| Townhouse Farmhouse; 53.08885°N 2.29696°W | | Early 17th century | The original part of the building is timber-framed with rendered infill and a tile roof; it is in two storeys. The addition was built in middle of the 18th century, giving the building a T-shaped plan. This wing is in brick, it has three storeys, and a symmetrical five-bay front. In the centre is a Neoclassical doorway with fluted pilasters, an open pediment, and a fanlight. | II |
| 21 and 23 Audley Road; 53.09179°N 2.29889°W | — | Late 17th to early 18th century | A pair of brick semi-detached houses with tiled roofs in two storeys. In the centre are doorways flanked by three-light windows. There are similar windows in the upper floor. | II |
| Christ Church; 53.09775°N 2.31670°W | | 1789–90 | Built in sandstone, the church is in Georgian style. It consists of a nave, a chancel with an apsidal east end, and a west tower. At the west end is a doorway surrounded by Doric columns and a pediment. The tower has a clock face on each side, and is surmounted by a dentilled cornice and a balustrade. Along the sides of the church are round-headed windows, the bays being separated by giant pilasters. | II* |
| Gate piers, Christ Church; 53.09777°N 2.31700°W | | c. 1790 | Each of the gate piers consists of a sandstone monolith. They have moulded bases and capitals, and stepped tops carrying vase finials. | II |
| School and master's house 53.09777°N 2.31760°W | | 1851 | The school buildings and schoolmaster's house are in brick with tiled roofs. The house is in two storeys and has two bays, the right bay projecting forward and gabled. In the angle is a lean-to porch. The school buildings are in a single storey, and there is a further gabled wing to the right. | II |
| St Mary Magdalene's Church; 53.09606°N 2.30709°W | | 1894–96 | The church was designed by Hubert Austin, and was completed in 1936–37 by Henry Paley. It is constructed in sandstone with a tiled roof, and consists of a nave with a clerestory, aisles, porches, a chancel with a vestry, and the base of a west tower with a stair turret. The planned higher tower and spire were never built. | II |
| War memorial 53.09451°N 2.30178°W | | 1920 | The memorial consists of a sandstone statue on a granite base. The statue depicts a soldier in World War I uniform carrying a rifle, standing on a column on a base of three steps. The sides of the column carry inscriptions and the names of those who were lost in both world wars. | II |
