= Church Lawton =

Village in Cheshire, England

Coordinates: 53.098695°N 2.267436°W

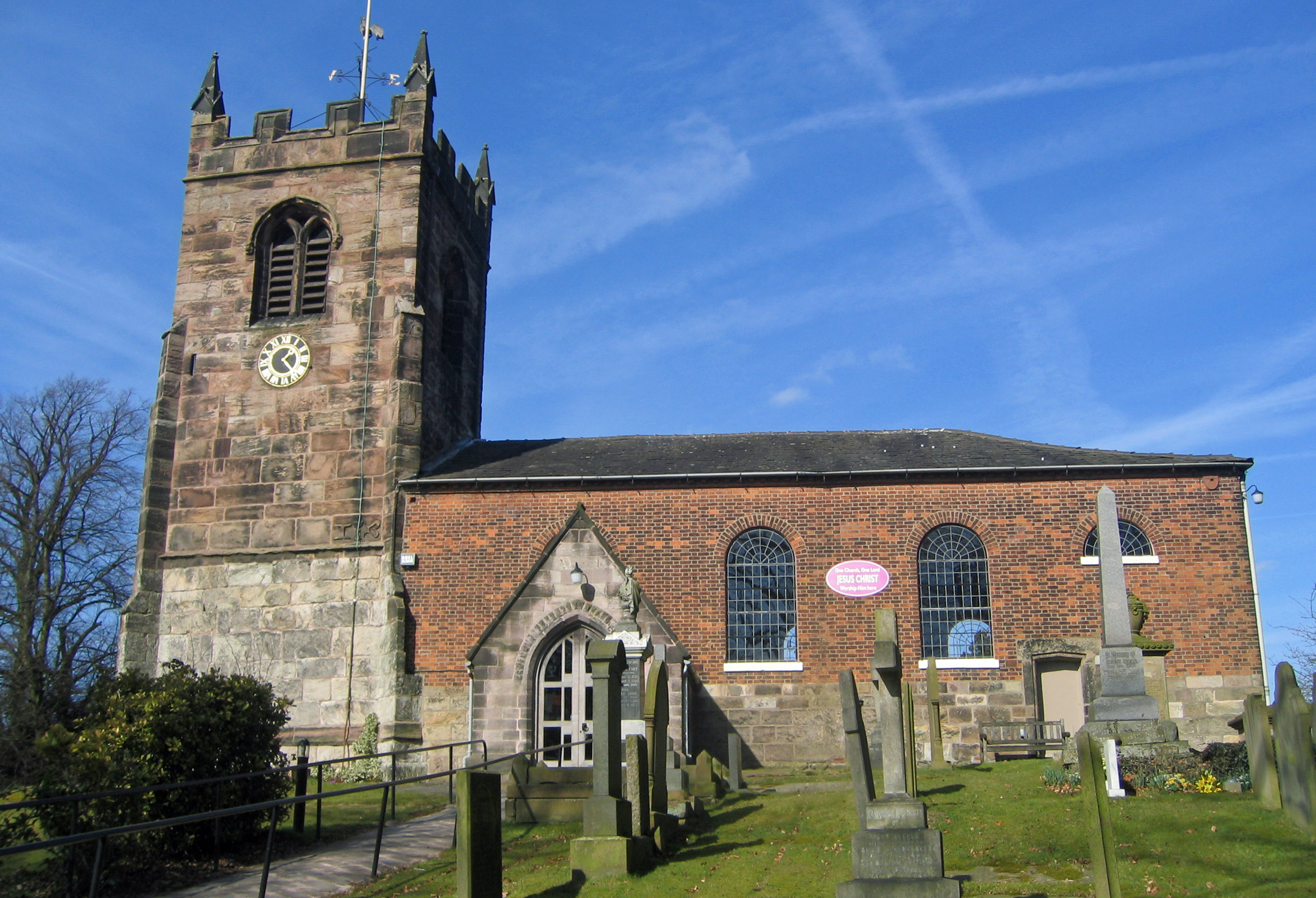
- All Saints’ Church, Church Lawton

- Location within Cheshire
- Population: 2,201
- OS grid reference: SJ821557
- Civil parish: Church Lawton
- Unitary authority: Cheshire East
- Ceremonial county: Cheshire
- Region: North West
- Country: England
- Sovereign state: United Kingdom
- Post town: STOKE ON TRENT
- Postcode district: ST7
- Dialling code: 01270
- Police: Cheshire
- Fire: Cheshire
- Ambulance: North West
- UK Parliament: Congleton

Church Lawton is a village and civil parish in the unitary authority area of Cheshire East and in the ceremonial county of Cheshire in England. Its eastern boundary forms part of the county boundary between Cheshire and Staffordshire. As the village is near Stoke-on-Trent, it has a Stoke postcode. In addition to ribbon development connecting Kidsgrove (in Staffordshire) with Scholar Green (in Odd Rode parish), the parish also contains the hamlets of Lawton Gate, Lawton Heath and Lawton Heath End, and the Lawton Hall estate. According to the 2001 census, the population of the entire parish was 2,201.

== History ==
There is evidence of human activity within the parish stretching back to the Neolithic period: a polished axe was found in the parish that was possibly made in Cornwall.

The collection of Church Lawton Barrows, also known as the Church Lawton Complex, is a significant Bronze Age site in the parish. The Complex consists of three Bronze Age mounds of which only two (Church Lawton II and Church Lawton III) survive. Church Lawton III is the more important of the two, having been excavated in the early 1980s. It seems to have been built in two phases; the first phase consisted of one of the few stone circles found in Cheshire, which was roughly 22.5 metres (73 feet 10 inches) in diameter, with a turf and daub platform in the centre, on which dead bodies were probably placed as part of an excarnation ritual prior to burial. There were gaps to the north and south of the circle serving as entrances, with two of the stones standing upright, with the remainder deliberately placed on their side. The second phase covered the central part with sandy subsoil and surrounded it with a low turf wall.

Church Lawton II was also built in two phases. In the first, a low mound made from sand and gravel subsoil surrounded by a ditch was constructed. It was about 16 metres (52 feet) in diameter and 1.5 metres (4.9 feet) high. In the centre of the mound was a sand-filled boat-shaped hollow with a wooden lid. It was found to be empty of any bones, possibly because any bones had rotted away in the acidic soil environment. Eighteen pits, most likely cremation pits, were found on the mound, and four outside the surrounding ditch. Most of the contents of these were adults, but a few were children or foetuses. Two food vessels and two "Collared Urns" were also found. In the second phase, the diameter increased to 30 metres (98 feet), but there were only a number of fire pits and pyres discovered along with one actual cremation. A number of pottery shards were also recovered, though they had been badly damaged by ploughing. Some pottery associated with the Beaker culture was also recovered from what would have been the soil surface at the time of construction, showing that this area had human habitation for an extended period.

Nothing of substance is known about Church Lawton I, as it was partially destroyed by the building of the current A5011 Newcastle-under-Lyme to Sandbach road some time before 1881. The remaining part of it was subsequently destroyed by the building of a petrol station, much later.

=== Medieval history ===
In 1338 Ralph de Lawton, who held the manor of Bog-lawton (now Church Lawton) surrendered it to Henry de Motlowe and his heirs. Henry, whose family came from Nether Alderley, later became Lord Chief Justice of Ireland.

== Governance ==
Church Lawton is an ancient parish, though there is some evidence that it was previously part of the ancient parish of Astbury (now Newbold Astbury). It also was part of Nantwich Hundred, Congleton Poor Law Union and Rural Sanitary District, and after 1866 it formed part of Congleton Rural District. County boundary changes in 1965 led to an exchange of small pieces of land between it and the civil parish of Kidsgrove, in Kidsgrove Urban District, in the neighbouring county of Staffordshire. From 1974 the civil parish was served by Congleton Borough Council, which was succeeded on 1 April 2009 by the new unitary authority of Cheshire East.

In terms of parliamentary representation, Church Lawton was in the Cheshire Southern Division from 1832 to 1867; in the Cheshire Mid Division, from 1867 to 1885; in the Crewe Division, from 1885 to 1948; and from 1948 it was in Knutsford County Constituency, but it is currently in Congleton County Constituency.

In local government Church Lawton is covered by Church Lawton Town Council. It consists of 10 councillors, with one acting as Chairman of the council for a term of 12 months. There is an Annual Parish Meeting on the fourth Wednesday of April.

== Notable people ==
- Charlie Burgess (1883 in Church Lawton – 1956), an English footballer who played over 200 games mainly for Stoke City.
- Andor Gomme (1930 – 2008 in Church Lawton), a British scholar of English literature and architectural history, frequent reviewer for the Times Literary Supplement and an academic at Keele University. He lived in Barleybat Hall from 1960.
- Phil Sproson, footballer for Port Vale 1977 1989 500 appearances lives in Church Lawton

== Freemen ==
Below is a very short list of Freemen of Church Lawton and when the title was bestowed:

- Austin Fernihough (October 2022)

== See also ==
- Listed buildings in Church Lawton
- All Saints Church, Church Lawton
- Lawton Hall
- Lawton railway station

== Bibliography ==
- Dunn, F. I. (1987). The Ancient Parishes, Townships, and Chapelries of Cheshire. Chester, United Kingdom: Cheshire Record Office and Chester Diocesan Record Office, Cheshire County Council. ISBN 0-906758-14-9.
- Morgan, V., and Morgan, P. (2004). Prehistoric Cheshire. Ashbourne, Derbyshire: Landmark Publishing Company. ISBN 1-84306-140-6.
- Youngs, F. A. (1991). Guide to the Local Administrative Units of England. Volume I: Northern England. London: Royal Historical Society. ISBN 0-86193-127-0.
