= Betchton Heath =

Hamlet in Cheshire, England

Coordinates: 53.141°N 2.334°W

- Location within Cheshire
- OS grid reference: SJ7760
- Unitary authority: Cheshire East
- Ceremonial county: Cheshire
- Region: North West
- Country: England
- Sovereign state: United Kingdom
- Police: Cheshire
- Fire: Cheshire
- Ambulance: North West

Betchton Heath is a hamlet in Cheshire, England.
