= Listed buildings in Mobberley =

Mobberley is a civil parish in Cheshire East, England. It contains 43 buildings that are recorded in the National Heritage List for England as designated listed buildings. Of these, one is listed at Grade I, the highest grade, three are listed at Grade II*, the middle grade, and the others are at Grade II. Other than the village of Mobberley, and part of the runways of Manchester Airport, the parish is rural. The listed buildings are what would be expected in such an area, namely country houses and associated structures, farmhouses and farm buildings, smaller houses and cottages, and a church with associated structures.

== Key ==
Grade	Criteria
I	Buildings of exceptional interest, sometimes considered to be internationally important
II*	Particularly important buildings of more than special interest
II	Buildings of national importance and special interest

== Buildings ==
Name and location	Photograph	Date	Notes	Grade
St Wilfrid's Church; 53.31816°N 2.31608°W		c. 1245	The church was extended in about 1450 and in 1533 the tower was replaced. The chancel was largely rebuilt in 1888 by J. S. Crowther. The church is built in stone with a slate roof, and consists of a nave, aisles, a chancel with a north vestry, and a south porch. At the west end is a three-stage embattled tower. Inside the church is a fine rood screen, and there are faded paintings on the walls.	I
Dukenfield Hall; 53.31267°N 2.34301°W		Late 16th or early 17th century	This originated as a timber-framed house, which was faced with brick, extended, and heightened in the 17th century. There were further additions in the 19th and 20th centuries. The house is built in brick with stone dressings and has a stone-slate roof. It is in two storeys with attics, and has an E-shaped entrance front, each projection being gabled. Inside the house is a cruck-framed hall.	II*
Saltersley Hall; 53.32554°N 2.27341°W		Late 16th or early 17th century	A farmhouse in an isolated position in Lindow Moss. It is in two storeys, with the ground floor in sandstone, and the three gables in the upper storey in brick.. The farmhouse has a slate roof. It originally had an H-shaped plan, but alterations in the 19th and 20th centuries resulted in a flat front. The windows are mullioned, and contain casements.	II
Old Hall; 53.31378°N 2.31293°W		1612	A larger portion was added later in the 17th century. The house is in brick with stone dressings and a stone-slate roof. It has two storeys, an attic and basement. The original portion has four bays, contains mullioned windows, and has a central gable. The later portion is in two bays, and contains a two-story semi-octagonal bay window. The windows in this part are mullioned and transomed. The right side is in three bays and contains an arched doorway.	II*
Barlow House Farmhouse; 53.31756°N 2.27322°W		Early 17th century	The farmhouse has a central range flanked by gabled wings. It is built in brick with roofs of slate and stone-slate, and is in two storeys. The entrance front has five bays and contains a 19th-century porch. The windows are casements.	II
Barn, Barlow House Farm; 53.31761°N 2.27293°W		Early 17th century	The barn is timber-framed with brick infill on a stone base, and has a slate roof. The north front is symmetrical, but 19th-century additions have obscured the other fronts.	II
Old Smithy Cottage; 53.31359°N 2.31639°W		Early 17th century	The cottage is timber-framed with crucks, and is thatched. The exterior has been rendered, obscuring the timber-framing. The windows are casementss.	II
Four Lane Ends Cottage; 53.33176°N 2.34003°W		Mid-17th century	A timber-framed house on a stone plinth with brick infill and a thatched roof. It is in two storeys and has a two-bay front. The windows are casements, those in the upper floor being in dormers. There is a 20th-century extension to the left. Some interior walls have wattle and daub infill.	II
Pine Tree Cottage; 53.31099°N 2.30253°W		Mid-17th century	A house that was altered and extended in the 20th century. It is partly timber-framed with rendered infill, and partly in rendered brick. The roof is partly thatched and partly slated. The house is in two storeys, and has casement windows.	II
Newton Hall; 53.31389°N 2.29708°W	—	17th century	The original wing is at the rear, and is in two storeys. The main range was added in the 19th century and is in three storeys, and has three gables with bargeboards. To the left is a 20th-century two-storey extension. The building is in brick with stone dressings, it is partly rendered and partly whitewashed, and has slate roofs.	II
Old Rectory; 53.31773°N 2.31493°W		17th century	A house that was extended in the 19th and 20th centuries. It is timber-framed on a stone plinth with roofs of slate and stone-slate. The house is in two storeys, and contains casement windows. At the south end is a 20th-century gabled wing, and at the rear is a 20th-century connecting wing linking the house to former farm buildings to incorporate them into the house.	II
Wall and gate piers, Old Hall; 53.31405°N 2.31305°W	—	17th century	The wall is in brick with stone coping, and has two buttresses. The gate piers are square on moulded plinths, and have caps carrying balls.	II
Paddock Hill Cottage; 53.31272°N 2.28239°W		17th century	A timber-framed house with brick infill and a thatched roof on a stone plinth. It is in two storeys, and contains doors, a bow window and dormer windows that were added in the 20th century.	II
Yew Tree Cottage; 53.31280°N 2.31788°W		17th century	A house that was expanded in the 19th and 20th centuries. It is partly timber-framed on a stone plinth with brick infill, and partly in brick, and has a slate roof. The house is in two storeys, the original part containing mullioned windows. There are later casement windows, and dormers in the upper floor. Inside the house is an exposed cruck.	II
Beech Cottage; 53.31264°N 2.32101°W	—	Late 17th century	A house that was altered in each of the following centuries. It is partly timber-framed with brick infill, and partly in brick, and is in one and two storeys. The roof is partly thatched and partly roofed with cement tiles. The windows are casements. At the rear is a 20th-century wing.	II
Damhead House; 53.31122°N 2.31511°W		Late 17th century	The farmhouse was altered and extended in the 18th and in the late 19th centuries. It is in brick with a stone tile roof, and has two storeys with an attic and cellar. On the entrance front are a gabled porch, a staircase window, and mullioned and transomed windows. At the rear is a single-storey angled bay window.	II
Barn, Dukenfield Hall; 53.31267°N 2.34255°W	—	Late 17th century	The barn is built in brick with a slate roof, and has an L-shaped plan. The main range contains a barn door, replaced windows and two pitch holes. The left gabled wing has a carriage entrance and another pitch hole.	II
Gate piers, Dukenfield Hall; 53.31280°N 2.34312°W	—	Late 17th century	The gate piers are in sandstone. They have a square plan with moulded chamfering, and have domed caps. Between them are 20th-century wrought iron gates.	II
Grange Farmhouse; 53.31144°N 2.29819°W		Late 17th century	The farmhouse was extended in the 18th century. It is in brick with a slate roof, and has two storeys with a four-bay front. The windows are casements. On the left side is a two-storey bay window containing sashes.	II
Pavement Lane Farmhouse; 53.30961°N 2.33514°W	—	Late 17th century	A brick farmhouse with a slate roof that was altered in the 18th century. It is in two storeys, and has an entrance front of five bays with a 19th-century central doorway. The windows are sashes. Inside the farmhouse is an inglenook with a bressumer.	II
Stables and garage, Old Hall; 53.31388°N 2.31237°W	—	1686	Originating as farm buildings, and later used as stables, a garage, and for storage, they are in brick with stone dressings and have a stone-slate roof. Originally they were in a single storey, and an upper storey was added in the 19th century. The entrance front contains garage doors, a stable door, and windows.	II
Walls to Quaker graveyard 53.31749°N 2.28730°W		Late 17th to early 18th century	The walls are about 4 feet (1.2 m) high and surround the Quaker graveyard forming a rectangular enclosure. The front and back walls are in sandstone with triangular coping; the side walls are in brick with flat stone coping.	II
Antrobus Hall; 53.30680°N 2.29979°W		1709	A brick country house with a roof of stone flags, to which a left wing was added in about 1760. The house is in two storeys with a basement and an attic. The entrance front has five bays in the ground floor, and four in the upper storey. The windows are casements. At the rear is a staircase turret. The garden walls, and the decorative stone rusticated gate piers with drum and ball finials, are included in the listing.	II*
Roebuck Inn; 53.31261°N 2.31759°W		Early 18th century	A public house that was extended in the 19th century. It is built in brick with a slate roof. The original section is symmetrical with two bays, and has a central doorway. The later extension to the left also has two bays. The windows are casements.	II
Beech Tree Cottage; 53.32509°N 2.30145°W		18th century	A small brick house with a thatched roof. It is in two storeys and has a symmetrical three-bay front. There is a central doorway flanked by windows, all with segmental heads. In the gable is a casement window.	II
Coppock House; 53.30812°N 2.30388°W		18th century	A brick house with a stone-slate roof. It is in two storeys, and has a three-bay front and a two-bay 19th-century wing at the rear. The windows are casements. Inside the house are timber-framed walls with wattle and daub infill.	II
Moss Cottage; 53.31240°N 2.29174°W	—	18th century	A brick cottage with a thatched roof, in two storeys with a three-bay front. There is an extension at the rear. The windows are casements.	II
Gate piers, Newton Hall; 53.31408°N 2.29755°W	—	18th century	The gate piers are in stone. Each pier has a moulded plinth, a rusticated shaft, and a pyramidal cap with a ball finial. On the shafts are 20th-century iron name plates.	II
Parish stocks 53.31803°N 2.31588°W		18th century	The stocks stand in front of the east wall of the churchyard of St Wilfrid's Church. They consist of two stone posts with an iron tie-bar, and contain a wooden board with four foot holes.	II
Forge Cottage; 53.31300°N 2.32258°W	—	1775	Originating as a blacksmith's forge and house, it has been converted into a dwelling. The house is in brick with a slate roof, and is in two storeys. The central bay projects slightly forward and contains a basket arch, filled in, and containing a window. The windows are casements with keystones. On the front of the house is a datestone.	II
Cottage to left of the Bird in Hand public house 53.31195°N 2.29863°W		Late 18th century	A brick cottage with a stone-slate roof, it is in two storeys and has a three-bay front. The windows are casements with stone sills.	II
Church Inn; 53.31814°N 2.31552°W		Late 18th century	A public house in brick with a slate roof. It is in two storeys and has a symmetrical three-bay front. There is a central doorway with a keystone. The windows have stone sills and keystones.	II
Grove House; 53.31338°N 2.32314°W	—	Late 18th century	A brick house with a slate roof, it is in two storeys and has a symmetrical three-bay front. In the centre is a doorway with three-quarter Roman Doric columns, supporting an entablature with a pediment, and with a semicircular fanlight. This is flanked by single-storey canted bay window. The windows are sashes.	II
Cottage to right of the Bird in Hand public house 53.31188°N 2.29800°W		1777	A brick house with a tiled roof, in two storeys with a three-bay front. The windows are casements. Above the doorway and the ground floor windows are keystones. Above the door is a recessed panel with a datestone.	II
Lake House; 53.31295°N 2.31474°W	—	c. 1780	A brick house with a slate roof. It is in two storeys with a basement, and has a symmetrical three-bay front. Seven steps lead up to a Classical doorway with a pediment. In the ground floor are bay windows, the other windows being sashes. At the top of the house is a modillion cornice.	II
Holly House; 53.31103°N 2.29709°W	—	1787	A brick house with a slate roof, it is in two storeys and has a three-bay front. Above the doorway is a recessed panel with a datestone. The windows are casements.	II
Old Bakery Cottage; 53.31174°N 2.29928°W		1791	A brick cottage with a slate roof, in two storeys with a symmetrical In the centre is a gabled porch, above which is a stone inscribed with initials and the date. The windows are sashes.	II
Park Farmhouse; 53.32923°N 2.34732°W	—	Early 19th century	The farmhouse is in brick with a slate roof, and has a symmetrical entrance front of three bays. Above the central doorway is a tympanum. The windows are casements.	II
Oak Bank Farm; 53.31744°N 2.28377°W	—	1846	A brick house with a slate roof. It is in two storeys and has a symmetrical three-bay front. The central bay projects forward, and has a doorway with Ionic pillars supporting a lintel, above which is a fanlight. The windows are sashes.	II
Margaret Barclay School; 53.31442°N 2.30430°W		1848	This originated as a country house, Mobberley Hall. It was extended in 1870, later converted into a school for physically handicapped children, and as of 2022 houses a residential care home for the elderly. It is built in stone with a slate roof, it is in three storeys, and has a complex plan. The symmetrical entrance front has a central square porch with a Gothic arch containing an achievement with a ball finial. At the rear is a four-storey octagonal turret.	II
Cornmill Cottage; 53.33331°N 2.33696°W		19th century	This originated as a corn mill, and has been converted into a dwelling. It is built in brick with a slate roof, and is in two storeys and a basement. The windows are casements.	II
Bagueleygreen Farmhouse; 53.32764°N 2.32997°W	—	1906	The farmhouse was designed by Percy Worthington. It is in brick with a tiled roof, and has two storeys with an attic. The house has a symmetrical three-bay front with a central doorway, porch, and a datestone. The windows are casements.	II
Cross base 53.31806°N 2.31601°W		Undated	The cross base is in the churchyard of St Wilfrid's Church. It consists of a massive square sandstone block that rises to an octagon. It has a square socket containing a chamfered octagonal shaft. On top of the shaft is a sundial with the gnomon missing. The structure is also designated as a scheduled monument.	II

== See also ==
- Listed buildings in Ashley
- Listed buildings in Chorley
- Listed buildings in Great Warford
- Listed buildings in Knutsford
- Listed buildings in Marthall
- Listed buildings in Ringway, Manchester
- Listed buildings in Tatton
- Listed buildings in Wilmslow
