= Listed buildings in Ashley, Cheshire =

Ashley is a village and civil parish in Cheshire East, England. It contains 19 buildings that are recorded in the National Heritage List for England as designated listed buildings, all of which are at Grade II. This grade is the lowest of the three gradings given to listed buildings and is applied to "buildings of national importance and special interest". Apart from the village of Ashley, the parish is entirely rural. Other than a church. a bridge, and three guideposts, the listed buildings are houses, structures related to houses, and farm buildings.

| Name and location | Photograph | Date | Notes |
|---|---|---|---|
| Storage building, Coppice Nursery; 53.36581°N 2.34726°W | | 16th century | This originated as a barn, it was altered in the 17th century, and extended at the rear in the 19th century. The earlier parts are basically timber-framed on a brick plinth, with brick and clapboard infill. It has a stone-slate roof. Originally the west end was a threshing floor, and the right end a cow byre. At the west end are two pairs of crucks. The 19th-century additions are in brick. |
| Outbuilding, Ryecroft Farm; 53.36041°N 2.36877°W | | 16th to 17th century | The outbuilding is timber-framed with brick infill and a slate roof. It is in a single storey, and consists of a single cell. |
| Ashley Hall; 53.36087°N 2.34896°W | | Late 16th to early 17th century | Additions were made in the 18th and 19th centuries. The hall is constructed in partly rendered brick with some timber framing, and the roof is slated. It is in two storeys, and has an entrance front of five bays, the central one of which is recessed and contains a porch. Over the outer bays and over the central bay is a gable. Most of the windows are casements. |
| Hough Green Farmhouse; 53.35250°N 2.33744°W | | 17th century | The farmhouse is built in brick with a concrete tile roof. It is in two storeys with an attic and has a four-bay entrance front. In the front are bay windows in the outer bays, and a gabled porch. The windows in the upper floor are mullioned. |
| Kitchen garden wall, Ashley Hall; 53.36032°N 2.34967°W | | 17th century | The wall was extended in the 18th century. The wall is in brick, the gate piers and cappings are in stone. Three walls have survived and measure between about 12 feet (3.7 m) and 15 feet (4.6 m) in height. The rear wall is supported by canted buttresses, and has a central arched opening. In the east wall are central gate piers and wrought iron gates. |
| Primrose Hill Farmhouse; 53.34256°N 2.34390°W | — | 17th century | The farmhouse was extended in the 18th and 19th centuries. It is built in brick, which is partly rendered, and has a slate roof. The farmhouse has an L-shaped plan, is in two storeys, and has a buttress in the centre of the front wall. Inside the farmhouse is an inglenook with a bressumer. |
| Sycamore Cottage; 53.35524°N 2.34724°W | | 17th century | The cottage was extended in the 19th century. It is timber-framed with brick nogging and has a stone-slate roof. The cottage is in two storeys, the right part of the north front being gabled. In the centre of the front is a projecting porch with a gabled roof supported on round wooden columns. |
| Tanyard Farmhouse; 53.35722°N 2.33169°W | — | 17th century | The farmhouse was extended in the 18th century. It is built in brick, some of which has been rendered, and it has a slate roof. The farmhouse is in two storeys, and has a symmetrical three-bay front. In the centre is a Neoclassical porch carried on Tuscan columns. This has a cornice, an open pediment, and a fanlight. The windows are casements with mullions. |
| Gate piers, Ashley Hall; 53.36077°N 2.34857°W | | Late 17th century | The gate are in ashlar and stand on a plinth. On the top are rusticated blocks each carrying a cornice and a decorated urn. |
| Carriage house, Ashley Hall; 53.36029°N 2.34730°W | | Early 18th century | The carriage house is built in brick with a slate roof, and has a front of three bays. In the front are three pairs of carriage doors and mullioned windows. On the left side are one-light windows, a hay loft door, and a pulley. |
| Lower House Farmhouse; 53.34688°N 2.33306°W | — | 1733 | The farmhouse was extended with a wing to the rear in 1888. It is built in brick with a slate roof, is in two storeys, and an entrance front of three bays. The windows are casements. |
| Stable block, Ashley Hall; 53.36035°N 2.34786°W | | Mid-18th century | The stable block is built in brick with stone dressings and a slate roof. It is in two storeys and has a front of nine bays, the outer bays projecting slightly forward. There is a central doorway with a frieze and a pediment, and two of the windows also have a frieze. In the centre of the roof is a vent with an opening the shape of a Venetian window. |
| Farm building, Tanyard Farm; 53.35687°N 2.33135°W | — | 18th century | The farm building is in brick with a slate roof. It is in two storeys, and is divided into two parts. On the courtyard front are barn doors to the right and stable doors to the left. There is timber-framing in the left gable end, and in the gable of the dividing wall. |
| Ashley Castle Mill Bridge; 53.35077°N 2.30347°W | | Late 18th to 19th century | The bridge carries Mill Lane over the River Bollin. It is in stone, and consists of a single segmental arch with a span of about 25 feet (7.6 m). The bridge has voussoirs and a stone parapet. Part of it is in Ringway, Greater Manchester. |
| Ashley Bridge; 53.36749°N 2.34642°W | — | Mid-19th century | The bridge carries Ashley Road over the River Bollin. It is constructed in rusticated ashlar, and has a single span. It has a solid parapet, and there are domed and pyramidal posts at the ends of the bridge. Part of it is in Hale, Greater Manchester. |
| Guidepost at the junction of Cow Lane and Castle Mill Lane; 53.36088°N 2.33710°W | | Late 19th century | The guidepost is in cast iron, and consists of a hollow octagonal shaft. It has a lower vertical section forming a plinth, the upper part tapers and has a moulded cornice at the top, above which is a round section supporting three lettered finger posts. The guide post is surmounted by a ball finial in the form of the base of a pawn chess piece, and a circular inscribed plate. |
| St Elizabeth's Church; 53.3556°N 2.3435°W | | 1880 | The church was designed by Wilbraham Egerton. It is constructed in red brick and terracotta and has a red tile roof. The church consists of nave, transepts, a chancel, a vestry, and a porch. On the west gable is a stone bellcote. The tracery in the nave windows is Perpendicular in style, and that in the transepts and east window is Decorated. |
| Guidepost at the junction of Castle Mill Lane and Tanyard Lane; 53.35652°N 2.33031°W | | Late 19th to early 20th century | The guidepost is in cast iron, and consists of a hollow octagonal shaft. It has a lower vertical section forming a plinth, the upper part tapers and has a moulded cornice at the top, above which is a round section supporting three lettered finger posts. The guide post is surmounted by a ball finial in the form of a pawn chess piece. |
| Guidepost at the junction of Back Lane and Mobberley Road; 53.35441°N 2.33882°W | | Early 20th century | The guidepost is in cast iron, and consists of a hollow circular tapering shaft on a moulded base, with a moulded architrave and a simple frieze, and a moulded cornice at the top. Above this is a round section supporting four lettered finger posts, with a later timber finger post attached to the top of the eastern post. The guide post is surmounted by a ball finial in the form of the base of a pawn chess piece, and an inscribed annulus roundel. |

== See also ==
- Listed buildings in Altrincham
- Listed buildings in Hale
- Listed buildings in Mobberley
- Listed buildings in Ringway, Manchester
- Listed buildings in Rostherne
- Listed buildings in Tatton
