= Ashley, Cheshire =

Village and civil parish in England

Coordinates: 53.354°N 2.339°W

Ashley
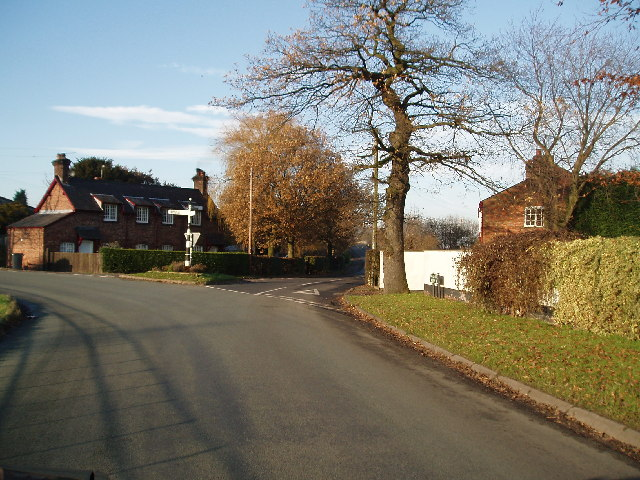
- Castle Mill Lane, Ashley, 2009

- Location within Cheshire
- Population: 358 (2021 census)
- OS grid reference: SJ775842
- Civil parish: Ashley
- Unitary authority: Cheshire East
- Ceremonial county: Cheshire
- Region: North West
- Country: England
- Sovereign state: United Kingdom
- Post town: ALTRINCHAM
- Postcode district: WA14, WA15
- Police: Cheshire
- Fire: Cheshire
- Ambulance: North West
- UK Parliament: Tatton

Ashley is a village and civil parish in Cheshire, England. At the 2021 census, it had a population of 358. The village is close to the border with Greater Manchester, just to the south of the M56 motorway and Manchester Airport. Neighbouring villages include Hale, Rostherne and Mobberley.

The Brereton family were Lords of the Manor of Ashley for several generations, from the reign of Henry VIII to about 1660.

Ashley Cricket Club was founded in 1888.

== Notable residents ==
- Sir John Brereton (1576–1629), King's serjeant-at-law at the Bar of Ireland
- Craig Charles (b. 1964), actor, comedian, DJ, and television and radio presenter, known for Red Dwarf, Coronation Street and BBC Radio 6 Music
- Humphrey Mainprice (1882–1958), first-class cricketer

== Gallery ==
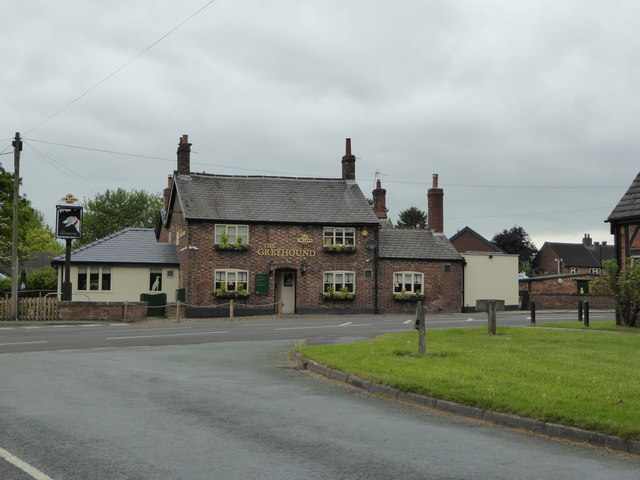
Front of The Greyhound, 2016

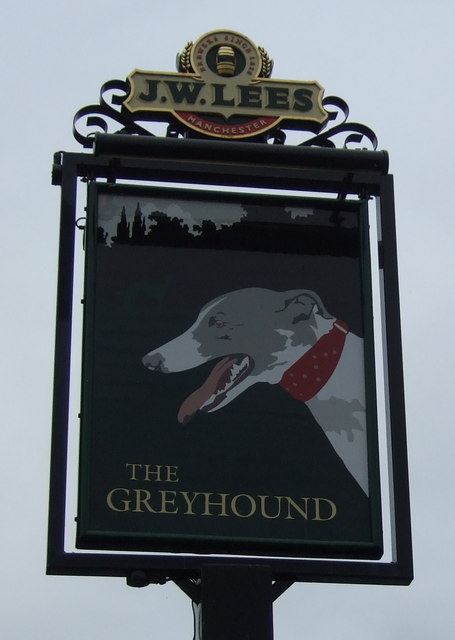
Sign for The Greyhound, 2016

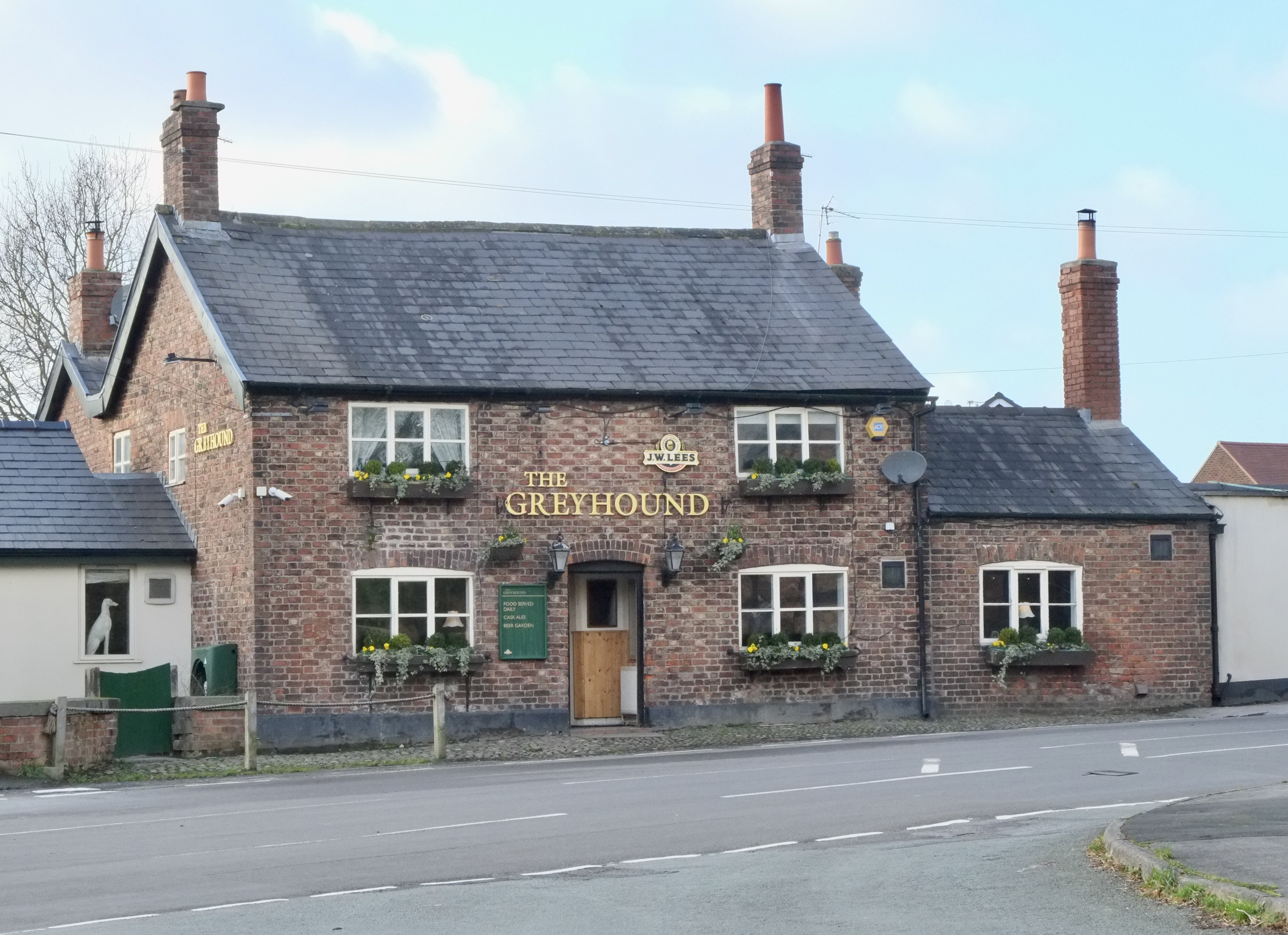
Front view of The Greyhound, 2022

== See also ==
- Ashley railway station
- Listed buildings in Ashley, Cheshire
- Ashley Hall
- St Elizabeth's Church, Ashley
