= Saltersley Hall =

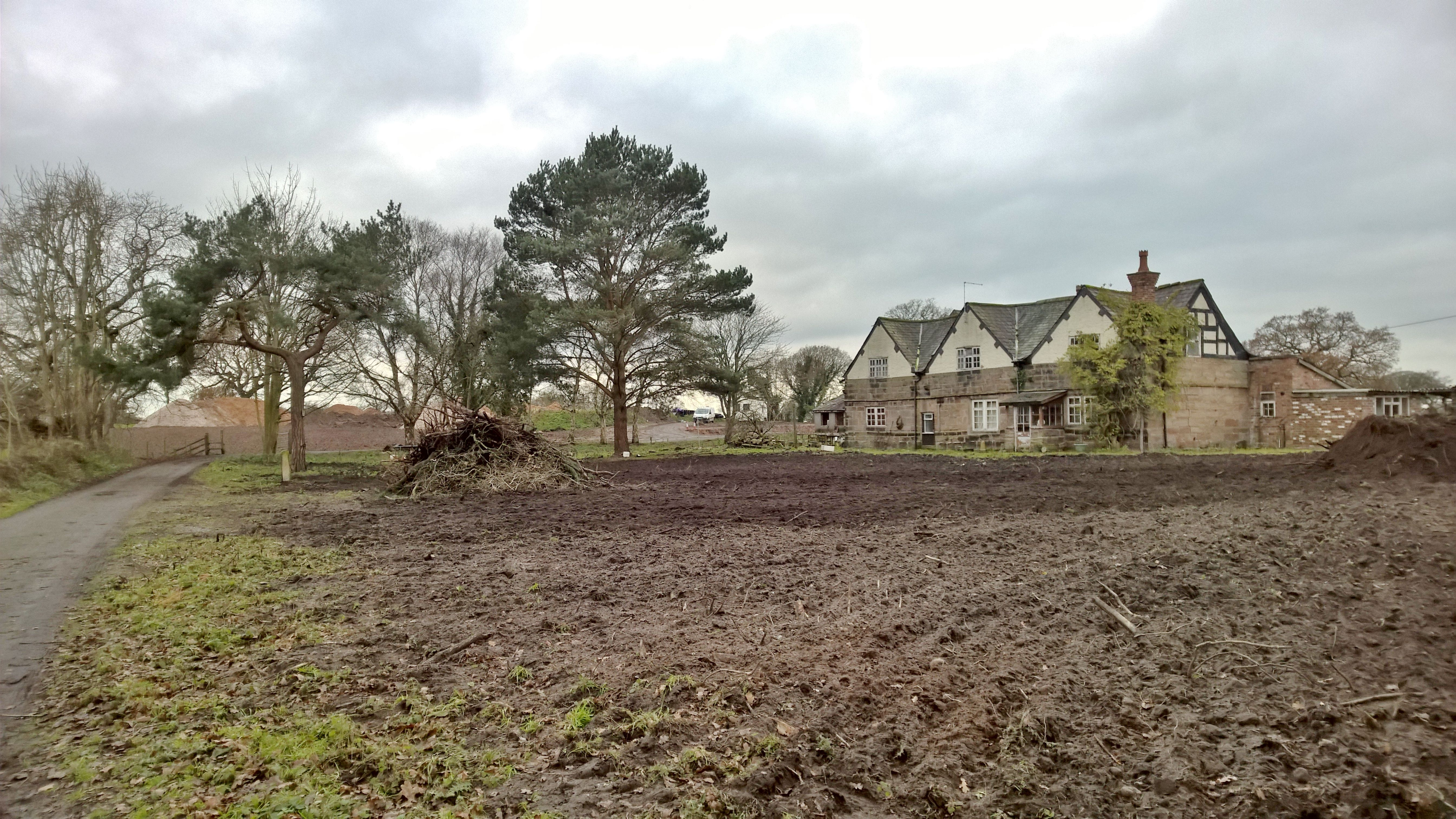

- Location in Cheshire
- 53.3255°N 2.2734°W
- Location: Mobberley, Cheshire, England

Listed Building – Grade II
- Official name: Saltersley Hall Farmhouse
- Designated: 5 March 1959
- Reference no.: 1139564

Saltersley Hall is a country house about 2 miles (3.2 km) west of Wilmslow, Cheshire, England, in the civil parish of Mobberley. The authors of the Buildings of England series describe it as a "lonely but high-status ... house on a sand island in the middle of Lindow Moss". The house was built in the 17th century, with additions in the 19th and 20th centuries. It is constructed in sandstone and whitewashed brick with a slate roof. Its medieval H-shape has been rationalised to form a flat front with three gables. The windows are mullioned. The house is recorded in the National Heritage List for England as a designated Grade II listed building.

== See also ==
- Listed buildings in Mobberley
