= David Briggs (Lord Lieutenant) =

British businessman based in Cheshire (born 1946)

Thomas David Briggs CVO MBE KStJ (born 25 August 1946, Huddersfield, West Riding of Yorkshire) is a British businessman based in Cheshire, England. He served as the Lord Lieutenant of Cheshire until August 2021.

== Education ==
He was educated at the Charterhouse School. He then received a First Class Honours Bachelor of Laws degree from the University of St Andrews. He then received an MBA from the Wharton School of Business at the University of Pennsylvania.

== Business career ==
He has lived in Cheshire since 1979. He was managing director and then Chairman of Dawsons Music until 2018. He and his family have lived at Dukenfield Hall in Mobberley since 1987.

== Voluntary service ==
He has volunteered with the St John Ambulance since 1975. He has been chairman and then President of Warrington Youth Club since 1980.

== Deputy Lieutenant of Cheshire ==
He was appointed as a Deputy Lieutenant of the County of Cheshire on 9 July 2003. This gave him the Post Nominal Letters "DL" for Life.

== High Sheriff of Cheshire ==
He served as the High Sheriff of Cheshire from 2006 to 2007.

== Lord Lieutenant of Cheshire ==
He was appointed as Lord Lieutenant of Cheshire on 7 March 2010.

As Lord Lieutenant He also served as Custos Rotulorum of Cheshire.

== Charities ==
David Briggs is personally involved with the following Charities as Lord Lieutenant.

- ABF The Soldiers' Charity –Cheshire East (President)
- Active Cheshire (Patron)
- Army Cadet Force, Air Training Corps and Sea Cadet Corps
- Bridge Community Farms
- Cheshire Agricultural Society / Cheshire Show (Deputy President)
- Cheshire Business Leaders
- Cheshire Childbirth Appeal (Patron)
- Cheshire Commonwealth Association (Patron)
- Cheshire Community Foundation (President)
- Cheshire Connect (Chairman)
- Cheshire County Cricket Club (Patron)
- Cheshire Young Carers (President)
- Cheshire, Merseyside and Shropshire Blood Bikes (Patron)
- Chester Cathedral (Chairman of Council)
- East Cheshire Hospice (President)
- Friends of Knutsford Heritage Centre (Honorary Member)
- NeuroMuscular Centre, Winsford (Patron)
- Reserve Forces and Cadets Association Northwest (President)
- Royal British Legion (Member)
- St John Ambulance (Member)
- Stick’n’Step (Patron)
- University of Chester (Member of Council)
- Vision Support (President)
- Warrington Youth Club (President)
- Platform for Life (Patron)
- Youth Federation for Cheshire, Halton and Wirral (President)

== Honours ==

| Ribbon | Description | Notes |
| | Royal Victorian Order (CVO) | Commander; 2021 New Years Honours List; 31 December 2020 |
| | Order of the British Empire (MBE) | Member; Civil Division; 2009 New Years Honours List |
| | Order of St John (K.StJ) | Knight of Justice; 2 February 2011 |
| | Queen Elizabeth II Diamond Jubilee Medal | 2012; UK version of this medal |
| | Service Medal of the Order of St John | With 2 Gold Bars; 13 December 2016; 2nd Gold Bar 13 July 2021 |

- He was appointed as Honorary Colonel of the Cheshire Army Cadet Force on 5 October 2010.

=== Scholastic ===
Honorary Degrees

| Location | Date | School | Degree | Gave Commencement Address |
|---|---|---|---|---|
| England | 2009 | University of Chester | Master of Arts (MA) | Yes |

Honorary titles
| Preceded by Carolin Mary Paton-Smith | High Sheriff of Cheshire; 2006–2007 | Succeeded by Nicholas Walter Bromley-Davenport |
| Preceded by Sir William Bromley-Davenport | Lord Lieutenant of Cheshire; 7 March 2010–25 August 2021 | Succeeded by Alexis Redmond |
| Preceded by Sir William Bromley-Davenport | Custos Rotulorum of Cheshire; 7 March 2010–25 August 2021 | Succeeded by Alexis Redmond |
