= St Wilfrid's Church, Mobberley =

Coordinates: 53.3182°N 2.3161°W

- St Wilfrid's Church, Mobberley, from the northeast in 2026

- Location in Cheshire
- OS grid reference: SJ 791 803
- Location: Mobberley, Cheshire
- Country: England
- Denomination: Anglican
- Website: St Wilfrid's Parish Church, Mobberley

History
- Status: Parish church
- Dedication: St Wilfrid

Architecture
- Functional status: Active
- Heritage designation: Grade I
- Designated: 5 March 1959
- Architect: J. S. Crowther
- Architectural type: Church
- Style: Gothic, Gothic Revival
- Completed: 1888

Specifications
- Materials: Ashlar stone Grey slate roof

Administration
- Province: York
- Diocese: Chester
- Archdeaconry: Macclesfield
- Deanery: Knutsford
- Parish: Mobberley

Clergy
- Rector: Rev Ian Blay

St Wilfrid's Church stands to the north of the village of Mobberley, Cheshire, England. The church is recorded in the National Heritage List for England as a designated Grade I listed building. It is an active Anglican parish church in the diocese of Chester, the archdeaconry of Macclesfield and the deanery of Knutsford. Alec Clifton-Taylor includes it in his list of 'best' English parish churches.

== History ==
When the church was undergoing restoration in 1888 remains of a Saxon church were found. The earliest written evidence of a church on the site is in 1206 when Patrick de Mobberley founded an Augustinian priory. This was short-lived as by 1240 it had been annexed to the priory of Rochester in Staffordshire. The oldest part of the present building dates from about 1245. At that time it consisted of a continuous nave and chancel under one roof, with narrow side aisles, and a detached tower. In 1450 a clerestory and new roof were added, and the aisles were widened. The tower was replaced in 1533 when the old one had become ruined. In 1888 the chancel was largely rebuilt by J. S. Crowther and a chancel arch replaced the tympanum. The church has a long association with the Mallory family.

== Architecture ==
=== Exterior ===
The church is built in ashlar stone with a grey slate roof. Its plan consists of a west tower attached to a four-bay nave with north and south aisles, a chancel with a vestry to the north, and a south porch. The tower is in three stages separated by carved string courses. The summit is embattled.

=== Interior ===
The low-pitched nave ceiling has cambered tie beams carried on short corbelled posts at the foot of which are figures of angels. The rood screen dates from about 1500 and is richly carved. The authors of the Buildings of England series regard this as the best rood screen in Cheshire. In the chancel are a carved ascending double sedilia and a piscina. The piscina dates from the 13th century. In the south window of the chancel is 14th-century stained glass consisting of the coats of arms of local families. There are also fragments of old glass in the windows of the south aisle. Over the nave arcades are faded wall paintings where the figure of St Christopher can be recognised, and on the north wall is a depiction of St George slaying the dragon. The font has a Victorian bowl on a pedestal which is an inverted Tudor font.

At the west end is a ringers' gallery which opens into the church. According to the church's website, the organ (since replaced) was moved from Manchester's Free Trade Hall and had been the property of Sir Charles Hallé. In the church is a memorial window to George Mallory who, with Andrew Irvine, lost his life climbing Mount Everest in 1924. The window is by A. K. Nicholson. There is a ring of six bells. Four of these are dated 1772 by Thomas Rudhall and the other two were recast in 1891 by John Taylor and Company. The parish registers begin in 1578.

== External features ==
In the churchyard is a cross base consisting of a massive square sandstone block with a square socket partly occupied by a chamfered square shaft that may have once carried a cross. A sundial plate with a broken gnomon is attached to its top. It is listed at Grade II and is also a scheduled monument. The churchyard also contains the war graves of a soldier of World War I and another of World War II. Just outside the churchyard wall are the Grade II listed former parish stocks, opposite the Church Inn, also Grade II listed.

== See also ==
- Grade I listed buildings in Cheshire East
- Grade I listed churches in Cheshire
- Listed buildings in Mobberley
- List of works by J. S. Crowther
