= Newton Hall, Mobberley =

Newton Hall
- Location in Cheshire
- 53.31390°N 2.29707°W
- Location: Mobberley, Cheshire, England

Listed Building – Grade II
- Official name: Newton Hall
- Designated: 20 September 1984
- Reference no.: 1230136

Newton Hall is a country house east of the village of Mobberley, Cheshire, England. It was built between 1634 and 1676 for Francis Newton. Additions were made to the house in the 19th and 20th centuries. It is constructed in brick that has been rendered and whitewashed, and has stone dressings and slated roofs. The house has three storeys, and along the entrance front are three gables with bargeboards dating from the 19th century. In the ground floor are five windows, all in 20th-century metal frames. In the upper floors are 19th-century two-light casement windows. To the left of the house is a large 20th-century extension, and behind it is a wing dating from the 17th century. The house is recorded in the National Heritage List for England as a designated Grade II listed building. The gate piers, dating from the 18th century, are also listed at Grade II.

== See also ==
- Listed buildings in Mobberley
