= Immuno AG =

Immuno AG was a major pharmaceutical company founded in 1960 by Dr. Otto Schwarz & Dr. Hans Eibl. Its headquarters are located in Vienna, Austria.

In 1996, the company was acquired by Baxter for $715 million.

== Business ==
Immuno-manufactured blood products including factor VIII and factor IX such as Kryobulin and Krobulin TIM.

== Lawsuits ==
In 1983, Immuno sued Dr. Shirley McGreal and several others claiming $4 million in damages for an article claiming that the company planned to use captured chimpanzees for hepatitis research in Sierra Leone.

In 1986, two civil lawsuits were brought against Immuno by the Association Against Animal Experimentation in regard to the treatment of chimpanzees.

The plant in Krems, which was set up in 2002 but never went into operation, was subjected to an examination of its further usability in the course of 2013. The partial expansion was announced in autumn of 2013: "In the first expansion stage, a production line is initially planned, and there is sufficient space for possible future expansions. The investment volume is estimated at 138 million euros. The start of construction is planned for the first quarter of 2014."
