= Antrobus Hall =

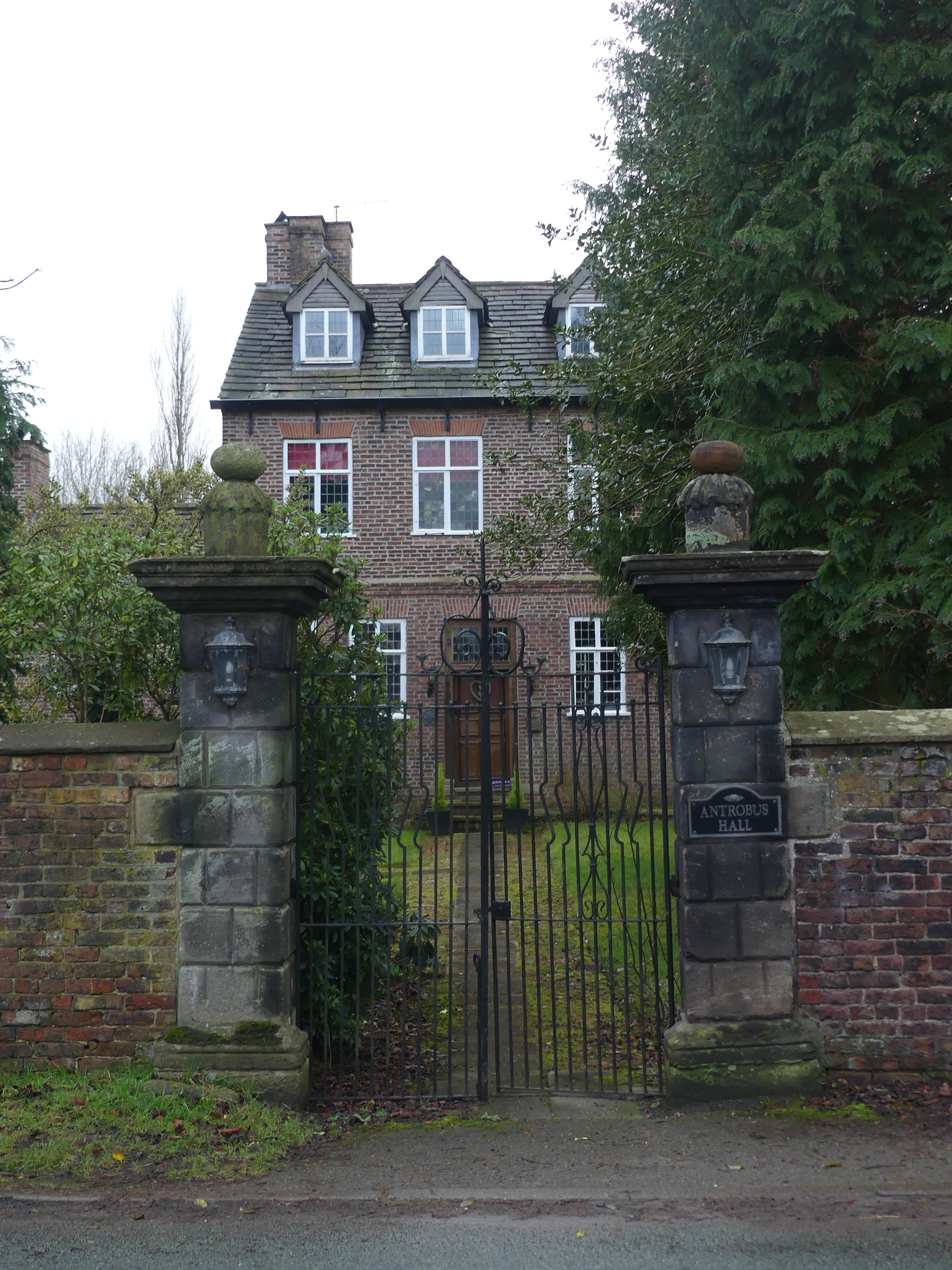

- Location in Cheshire
- 53.30679°N 2.29978°W
- Location: Mobberley, Cheshire, England

Listed Building – Grade II*
- Official name: Antrobus Hall, garden wall and gatepiers
- Designated: 5 March 1959
- Reference no.: 1329643

Antrobus Hall is a country house in the village of Mobberley, Cheshire, England. It was built in 1709, and a wing was added in about 1760. It was built for John Antrobus, a dissenter from Knutsford. The hall is constructed in brick, and has a stone-flagged roof. The house, together with its garden walls and gate piers, are recorded in the National Heritage List for England as a designated Grade II* listed building. The house has five bays on the ground floor, and four on its upper floor. The gate piers are rusticated.

== See also ==
- Grade II* listed buildings in Cheshire East
- Listed buildings in Mobberley
