= Chris Farnell =

English sports lawyer (born 1969)

- Born: 21 December 1969 (age 56)
- Education: Liverpool University
- Occupation: Lawyer
- Known for: Sports Law

Christopher William Farnell (born 21 December 1969) is an English solicitor. Farnell founded the Manchester-based legal practice IPS Law in 2006. He is a sports lawyer, also working in media and entertainment-related law. Farnell has worked for boxers, international footballers and managers, Premier League and English Football League clubs and European football agents. IPS Law was closed by the Solicitors Regulation Authority (SRA) in November 2025 due to suspected dishonesty by Farnell. The company appealed against the SRA's decision (unsuccessfully), but in April 2026 was wound up in relation to another dispute. Farnell remains suspended by the SRA.

== Biography ==
=== Career and sports law ===
Farnell studied economics at Liverpool University where he gained a 2:1 in economics before he studied law. Farnell was signed to Blackburn Rovers, but was unable to continue his career due to an injury. Farnell worked at Eversheds before, in 2004, becoming a partner at Hill Dickinson.

=== IPS Law LLP (2006–2026) ===
In 2006, Farnell founded and established IPS Law LLP as a niche sports law practice.

Farnell gained a reputation in sports law for representing players and managers and in particular his work on image rights. IPS specialised in image rights, player transfers, intellectual property contracts, contract re-negotiations, sponsorship and endorsement contracts, defamation, sports dispute resolution, footballer and agent disputes, doping hearings, regulatory issues, and both contentious and non-contentious intellectual property law. Farnell's clients included Chelsea midfielder Moisés Caicedo. Farnell has been involved in the purchases of several professional football clubs.

==== Wigan Athletic ====
Farnell was a club director between March and June 2013 of Wigan Athletic coinciding with the club's 2013 FA Cup Final win and Premier League relegation. His directorship was ended on the same day as manager Roberto Martinez left to join Everton.

==== Leeds United ====
Farnell advised Massimo Cellino during his 2014 takeover of Leeds United. Farnell reportedly sacked Leeds United manager Brian McDermott by telephone on behalf of the club's prospective new owner, Cellino.

==== Swansea City ====
Farnell was the lead lawyer on the 2016 sale of Swansea City to new owners and was later accused by former director Steve Penny, who wanted to profit from the sale of the club, of bullying and intimidation during a board meeting, to make him leave. The judge found that these claims were unsupported. Penny and fellow director Don Keefe won their claim of unfair dismissal.

==== Charlton Athletic ====
Farnell came under scrutiny for his involvement in a failed Charlton Athletic takeover attempt with Paul Elliott in June 2020. He was instructed to advise majority owner Tahnoon Nimer with his shareholder dispute with executive chairman and minority shareholder Matt Southall. He was present when police were called to The Valley as tensions rose. In June 2020 it was announced that the club had been taken over by Elliott; however, in a court case the following month, Farnell admitted the sale had not completed. On 6 August 2020, the attempted takeover by Elliott and Farnell was officially rejected by the EFL, with the EFL saying three individuals, one of them Farnell, were "subject to a disqualifying condition". Police had to be called to his offices in Hale, Greater Manchester after some supporters gained entry and demanded answers regarding the running of the club, and following news of Farnell's EFL disqualification both East Street Investments and Charlton Athletic officially terminated Farnell's involvement. BBC Sport established that the Solicitors Regulation Authority was investigating a complaint about Farnell. It had been alleged that Farnell had conflict of interest by acting for both parties in the potential sale of the club.

==== Burnley ====
On 28 October 2020, Farnell was informed that his disqualification from being an owner or director of a football club had been lifted after a successful appeal to an independent League arbitration panel. Farnell was interested in purchasing Burnley along with Mohamed El Kashashy. El Kashashy was also rumoured to be part of a takeover of Charlton Athletic in 2020, and had completed a sales and purchasing agreement for Burnley. However, in December 2020 they pulled out of a potential deal.

==== West Bromwich Albion ====
In June 2023 and in early 2024, Farnell was linked to bids to buy a minority stake in West Bromwich Albion, firstly with El Kashashy, and then in partnership with local businessman Alex Hearn.

==== IPS Law closure ====
In late 2024, IPS Law failed in its attempt to prevent US company Safe Harbor Equity advertising a winding-up petition; Farnell was criticised for his "significant silence" on evidential aspects of IPS Law's deal with the company.

In April 2025, IPS Law was accused of copying another firm's cost budget. In July 2025, the High Court in London ruled that IPS Law was not entitled to invoice for work relating to data-privacy claims on behalf of professional sports people. IPS Law had partnered with Global Sports Data Technology Group (co-founded by Jason Dunlop and former Cardiff City manager Russell Slade) to manage potential claims against computer-games manufacturers and betting companies using player data in their products.

IPS Law was closed by the Solicitors Regulation Authority on 11 November 2025 due to suspected dishonesty by Farnell. On 21 November 2025, Farnell said IPS Law had lodged an appeal against the SRA's decision. That appeal was dismissed by the High Court in May 2026, backing the SRA's decision to shut down IPS Law on the grounds of suspicions that its owner was dishonest, and Farnell remained suspended. Farnell told Legal Futures that he is pursuing an appeal against the High Court decision.

Also on 21 November 2025, the High Court ruled on a dispute relating to IPS Law's role in managing an escrow account. IPS Law held £1.5m on behalf of a Dubai-based businessman Mihir Choksi in relation to a deal with IPS client Biodex Trade Solutions. The judge said IPS's drafting of the agreement between Choksi and Biodex created sufficient uncertainty that the issue should proceed to trial. A witness statement from Farnell was criticised as "prolix and repetitive"; the court heard that an IPS paralegal had drafted the statement using an internal research memorandum with an AI overview.

In April 2026, IPS Law was officially wound up under the provisions of the Insolvency Act 1986 and a liquidator appointed. The order followed a petition by Global Sports Data and Technology Limited, which was owed around £421,000 by IPS Law. The court ordered that the petitioner's costs be paid out of IPS Law's assets.

== Personal life ==
In February 2014, Farnell was found not guilty of assaulting his first wife Rebecca, with whom he had four children. In September 2015 at Newcastle magistrates' court, Farnell, along with Sammy Lee, Phil Gartside and others, faced counts of perjury brought by Gavin McCann's former agent in a private prosecution relating to McCann's 2007 transfer to Bolton Wanderers. No evidence was offered and all were cleared of any wrongdoing. Farnell lives in Mobberley, Cheshire.
