= St Elizabeth's Church, Ashley =

Coordinates: 53.3556°N 2.3435°W

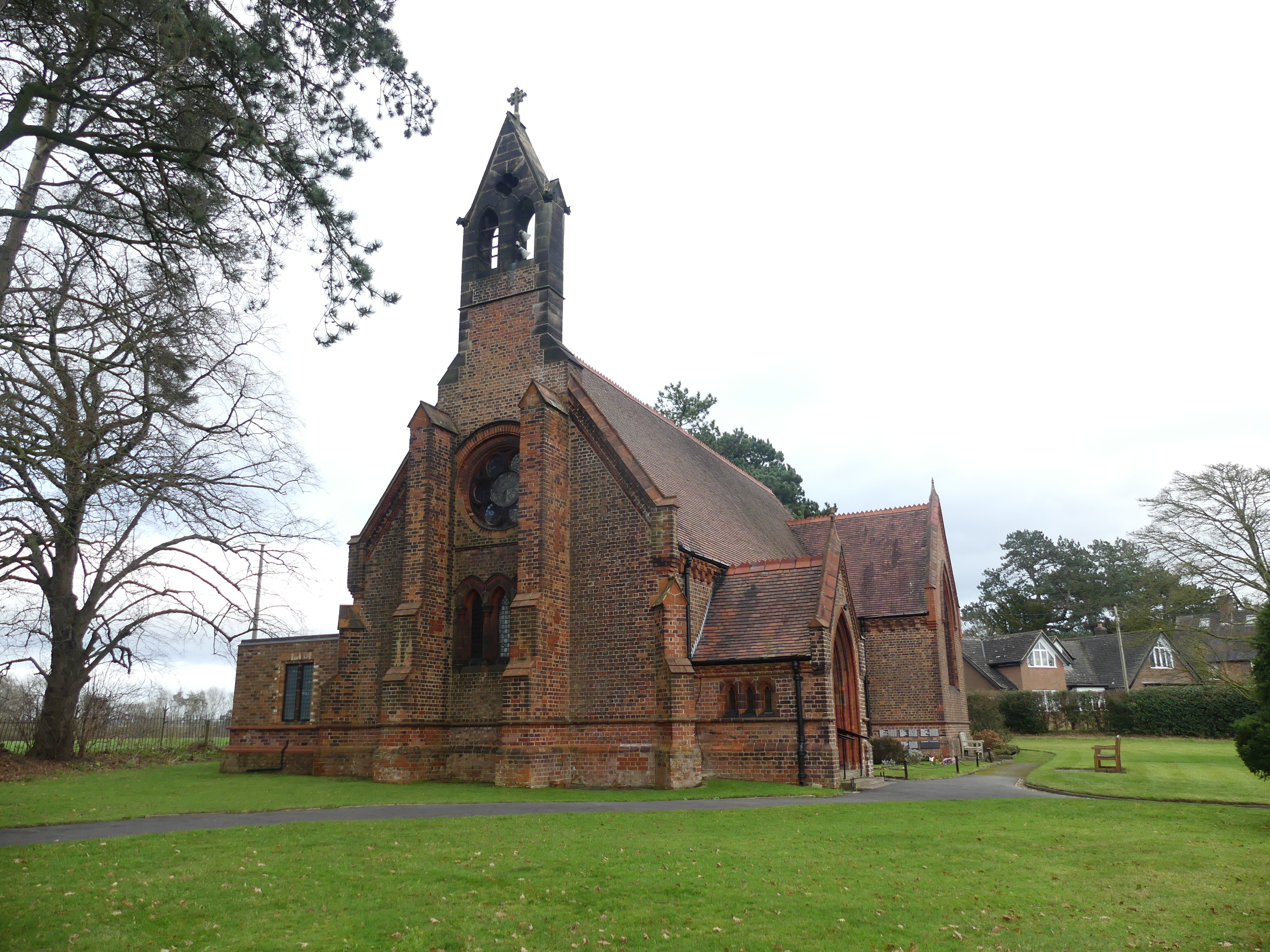

- Location in Cheshire
- OS grid reference: SJ 772 844
- Location: Ashley Road, Ashley, Cheshire
- Country: England
- Denomination: Anglican
- Website: St Elizabeth's, Ashley Church and Community Centre

History
- Status: Parish church

Architecture
- Functional status: Active
- Heritage designation: Grade II
- Designated: 20 September 1984
- Architect: Wilbraham Egerton
- Architectural type: Church
- Style: Gothic Revival
- Completed: 1880

Specifications
- Materials: Brick and terracotta Tiled roofs

Administration
- Province: York
- Diocese: Chester
- Archdeaconry: Macclesfield
- Deanery: Bowdon
- Parish: St Elizabeth, Ashley

Clergy
- Vicar: Venerable Mike McGurk

St Elizabeth's Church is on Ashley Road in the village of Ashley, Cheshire, England. It is an active Anglican parish church in the deanery of Bowdon, the archdeaconry of Macclesfield, and the diocese of Chester. Its benefice is combined with that of St Peter, Hale. The church is recorded in the National Heritage List for England as a designated Grade II listed building.

== History ==
The church was built in 1880 as a chapel of ease to St Mary, Bowdon, and became a parish in its own right the following year. It was designed by Wilbraham Egerton, who was later to become the 1st Earl Egerton.

== Architecture ==
St Elizabeth's is constructed in red brick and red terracotta, and has a red tiled roof. Its plan consists of a three-bay nave, a chancel, north and south transepts, a northeast vestry, and a southwest porch. On the west gable is a stone bellcote. The windows in the nave contain Perpendicular tracery, while those in the transepts and the east window have Decorated tracery. The chancel windows are spherical triangles. At the west end of the church are three lancet windows with trefoil heads between which are colonnettes, and above them is a trefoil rose window. On the bellcote are gargoyles.

Inside the church, the reredos has a tiled dado and panels with a floral decoration. The stained glass dates from 1925, but the artist and maker are unknown. The three-manual organ was built in 1885 by A. Young and Sons of Manchester, and was originally a house organ.

== See also ==
- Listed buildings in Ashley, Cheshire
