= Humphrey Mainprice =

English cricketer

Personal information
- Born: 27 November 1882; Ashley, Cheshire
- Died: 24 November 1958 (aged 75); Cornwall
- Batting: Right-handed

Domestic team information
- Years: Team
- 1905–1906: Gloucestershire
- Source: Cricinfo, 30 March 2014

Humphrey Mainprice (27 November 1882 – 24 November 1958) was an English first-class cricketer. He played 15 first-class matches for Gloucestershire and Cambridge University between 1905 and 1906.
