= Shirley McGreal =

British animal welfare activist (1934–2021)

Shirley McGreal OBE
- Born: Shirley Pollitt; 4 May 1934; Mobberley, Cheshire, England
- Died: 20 November 2021 (aged 87); Summerville, South Carolina, US
- Education: Royal Holloway, University of London; University of Cincinnati (PhD)
- Occupation: Animal welfare activist
- Spouse: John McGreal (m. 1960)

Shirley McGreal OBE (born Shirley Pollitt; 4 May 1934 – 20 November 2021) was an English animal welfare activist and conservationist. She founded the International Primate Protection League.

== Early life and education ==
McGreal was born Shirley Pollitt in Mobberley, Cheshire, on 4 May 1934. Her parents were Kate (née Pearson) and Allan Pollitt, a bank manager. She had an identical twin sister, Jean, with whom she developed an early interest in activism.

She studied Latin and French at Royal Holloway, University of London. She graduated in 1955. She studied postgraduate French at the University of Illinois. She received a PhD in education in 1971 from the University of Cincinnati.

== Animal welfare ==
McGreal's entry into the protection of animals was in 1971 when she was in Thailand. At the Bangkok Airport she saw crates with monkeys that were being shipped. She looked for an organization that could help her save such animals but found none. In 1973 she founded the International Primate Protection League. She settled the headquarters of the organization in Summerville, South Carolina and initiated a sanctuary for gibbons.

She achieved bans on the export of primates in India and Bangladesh, and protested the use of the animals at a University of California, Davis laboratory of the United States government and the US Armed Forces Radiobiology Research Institute. She uncovered a smuggling operation where primates were being sent from other countries to Singapore for export. She exposed the operation in an article in the Bangkok Post, which resulted in action by the Singapore government. She argued against euthanizing chimps that have been used in medical research, saying that they deserve "a decent retirement".

Although she decried the use of animals in research, she conceded that the practice would continue and therefore advocated for better living conditions and quality of life for the animals.

In 1983 she wrote a letter to the editor of the Journal of Medical Primatology criticizing the Austrian manufacturer Immuno AG, for its treatment of animals in its research. Immuno responded by charging McGreal with libel. Although it was argued that the letter was an opinion and therefore not libelous, McGreal settled due to the cost of continuing the suit.

== Personal life and death ==
She married John McGreal, an engineer, in 1960. They lived in India and Thailand, where he was working for the United Nations. She died at her residence on the grounds of the sanctuary she founded in Summerville, South Carolina on 20 November 2021, at the age of 87.

== Awards and recognition ==
- Order of the British Empire, 2008
- Interpol Wildlife Crime Group and the Dutch Police League, 1994
