= Dukenfield Hall =

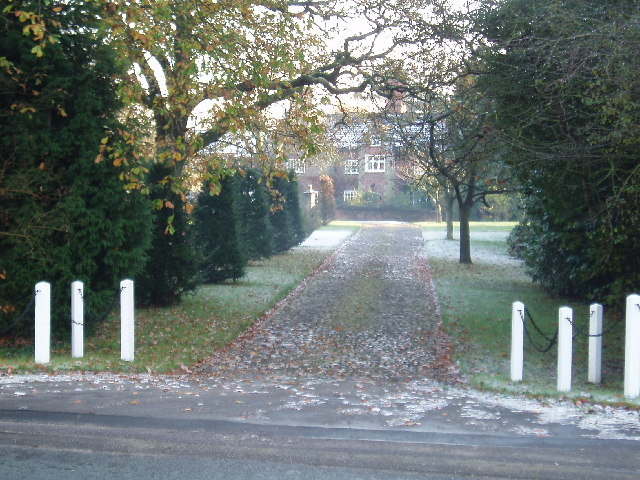
- Dukenfield Hall, from Knutsford Road

- Location in Cheshire
- 53.31266°N 2.34301°W
- Location: Mobberley, Cheshire, England

Listed Building – Grade II*
- Official name: Dukenfield Hall
- Designated: 5 March 1959
- Reference no.: 1230099

Dukenfield Hall is a country house between Knutsford and Mobberley in Cheshire, England.

Dukenfield Hall is recorded in the National Heritage List for England as a designated Grade II* listed building. It is constructed in plum-coloured brick with stone dressings, and has a stone-slate roof. The house is in two storeys plus an attic. Its entrance front is E-shaped, and has three projecting wings with gables.

Associated with the house are two structures listed at Grade II. These are the gate piers to the forecourt, and a barn.

The house was originally called Podmore House. It originated in the late 16th or early 17th century as a small cruck-framed house, entered at one end. During the 17th century it was faced with brick, cross wings were added and the roof was heightened. Further additions were made to the house in the 19th and 20th centuries.

Since 1987 Dukenfield Hall has been home to David Briggs and his family. Since 2010 he has served as the Lord Lieutenant of Cheshire.

== See also ==
- Grade II* listed buildings in Cheshire East
- Listed buildings in Mobberley
