= John Hulme (footballer) =

English footballer and manager

Personal information
- Date of birth: 6 February 1945
- Place of birth: Mobberley, England
- Date of death: 26 May 2008 (aged 63)
- Position: Central defender

Youth career
- 1960–1962: Bolton Wanderers

Senior career*
Years	Team	Apps	(Gls)
1962–1972	Bolton Wanderers	188	(7)
1971	→ Notts County	8	(0)
1972–1974	Reading	87	(0)
1974–1976	Bury	86	(5)
1976–1977	FC La Chaux-de-Fonds		
Total		369	(12)

Managerial career
- 1976–1978: FC La Chaux-de-Fonds
- * Club domestic league appearances and goals

John J. Hulme (6 February 1945 – 26 May 2008) was an English professional football player and manager.

== Career ==
Born in Mobberley, Hulme played in the Football League as a central defender for Bolton Wanderers, Notts County, Reading and Bury, before moving to Switzerland to become player-manager of FC La Chaux-de-Fonds.

He died on 26 May 2008, at the age of 63, from pancreatic cancer.
