= Ashley Hall, Cheshire =

Ashley Hall
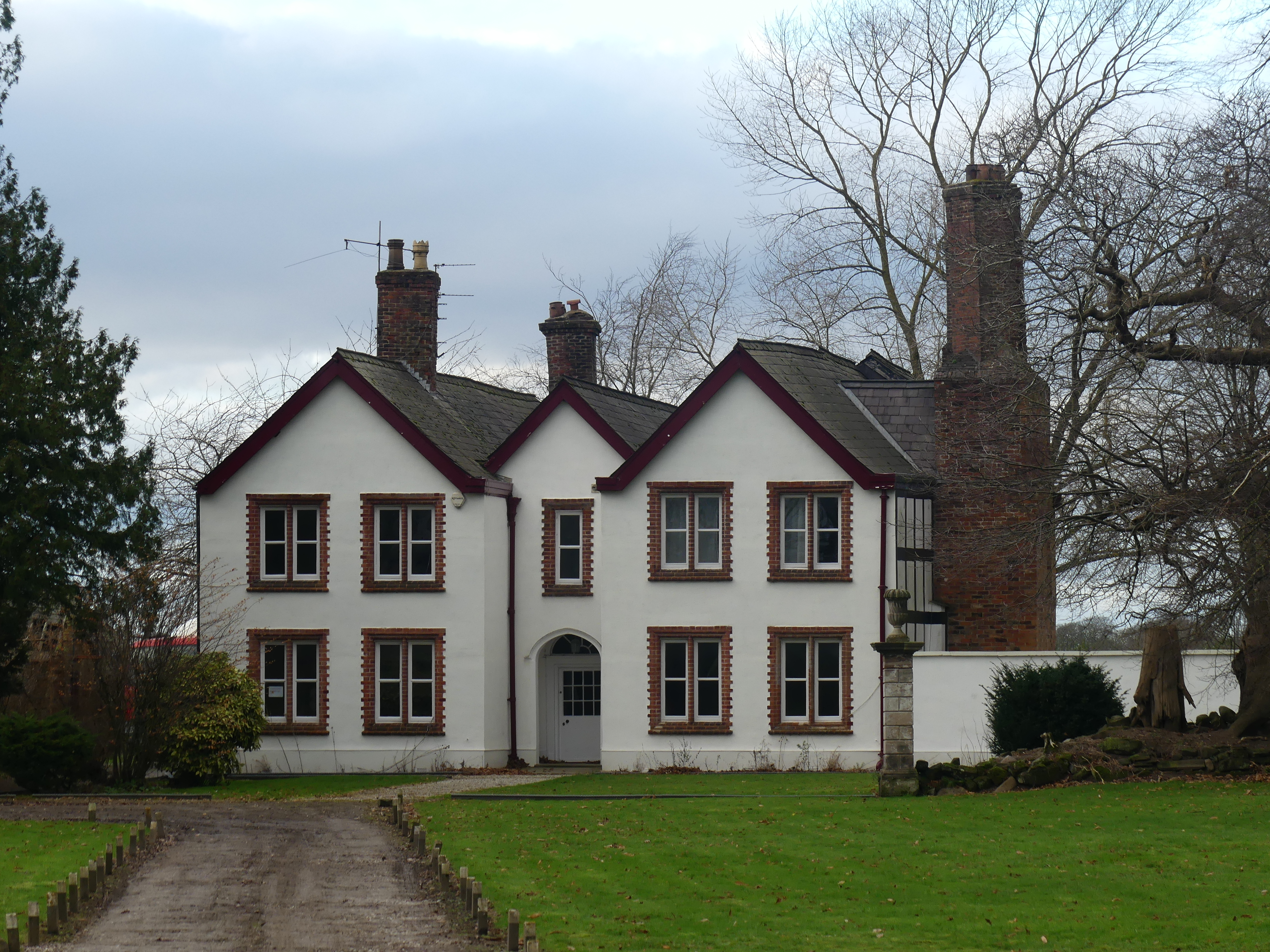
- Ashley Hall, east front in 2023

- Location within Cheshire
- 53.36087°N 2.34896°W
- Location: Ashley, Cheshire

Listed Building – Grade II
- Official name: Ashley Hall
- Designated: 5 March 1959
- Reference no.: 1329655

Ashley Hall is a country house north of the village and civil parish of Ashley in Cheshire, England. It dates from the late 16th to the early 17th century, with additions made in the 18th and 19th centuries. The house is historically important because it was here that the Cheshire gentlemen met in 1715 to decide whether to support the Stuarts or the Hanoverians. They decided on the latter and later commissioned a set of portraits, which now hang in Tatton Hall in Tatton Park near Knutsford. The house is recorded in the National Heritage List for England (NHLE) as a designated Grade II listed building. Also listed at Grade II are the gate piers to the forecourt of the building, a carriage house in the forecourt, the kitchen garden wall, and the stable block. For the biographical drama film Tolkien (2019), 15 acres of the Tatton Estate were used to recreate the trenches of the First World War.

== Other listed buildings at Ashley Hall ==
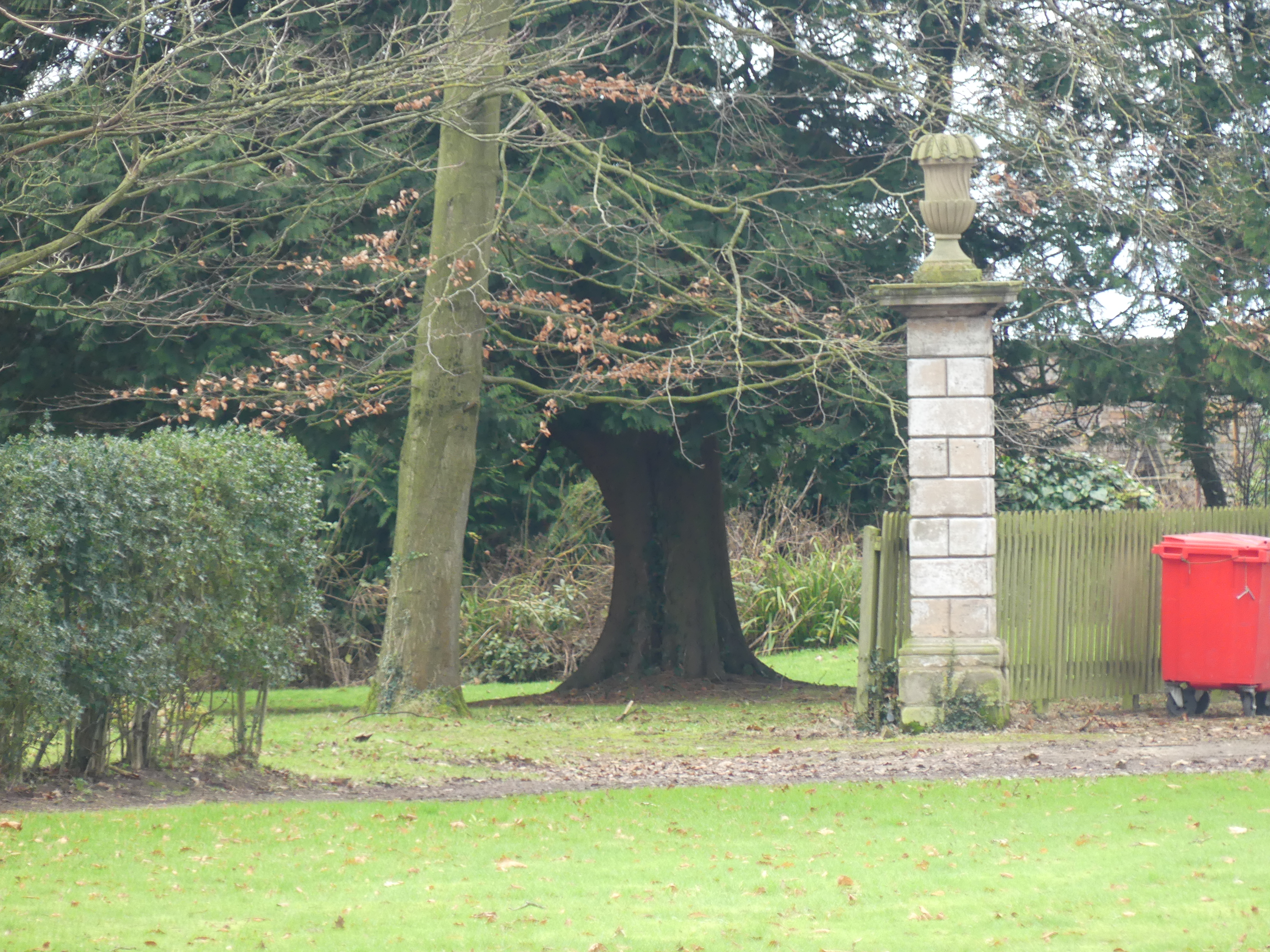
Gate pier

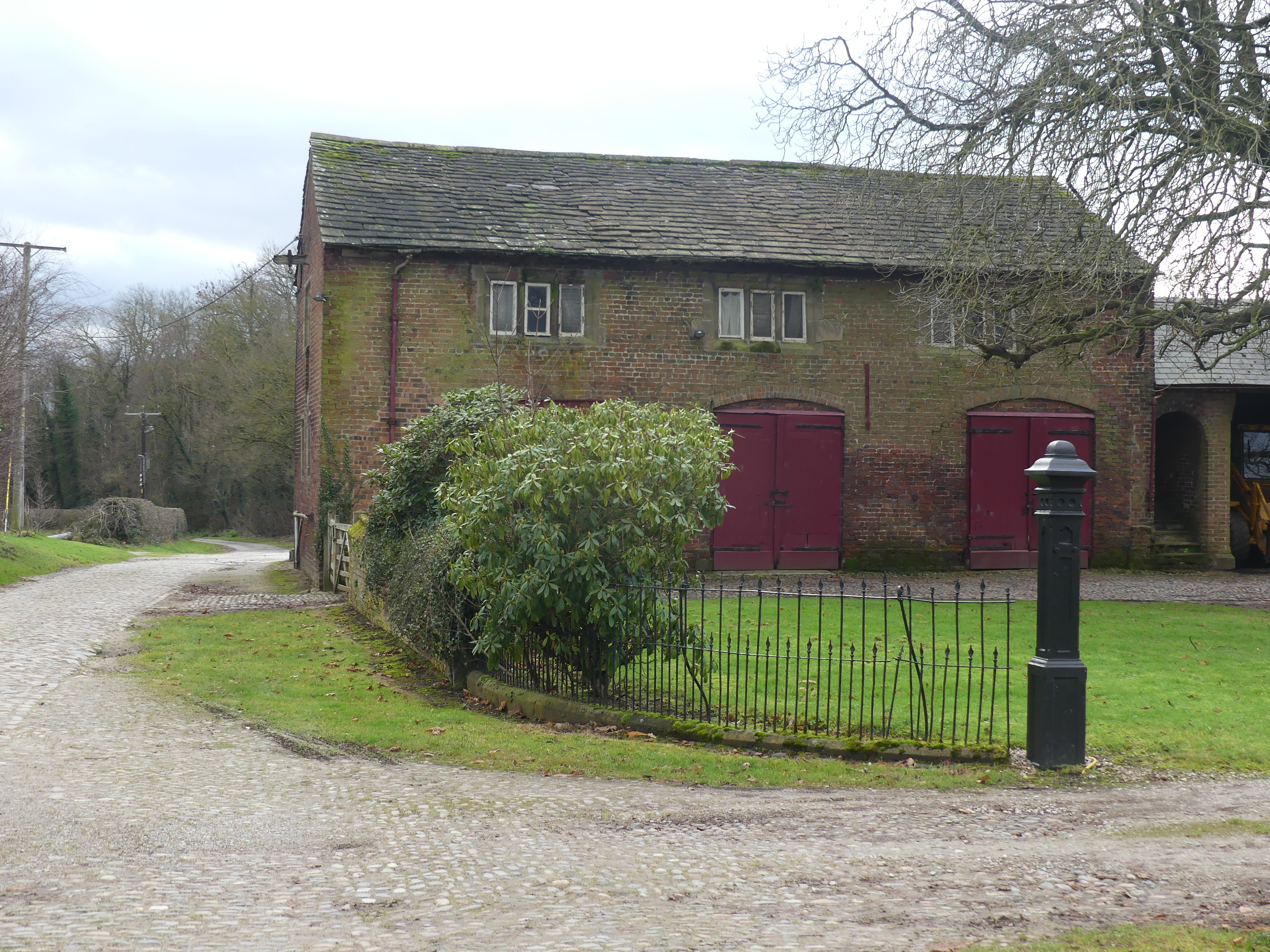
Carriage house

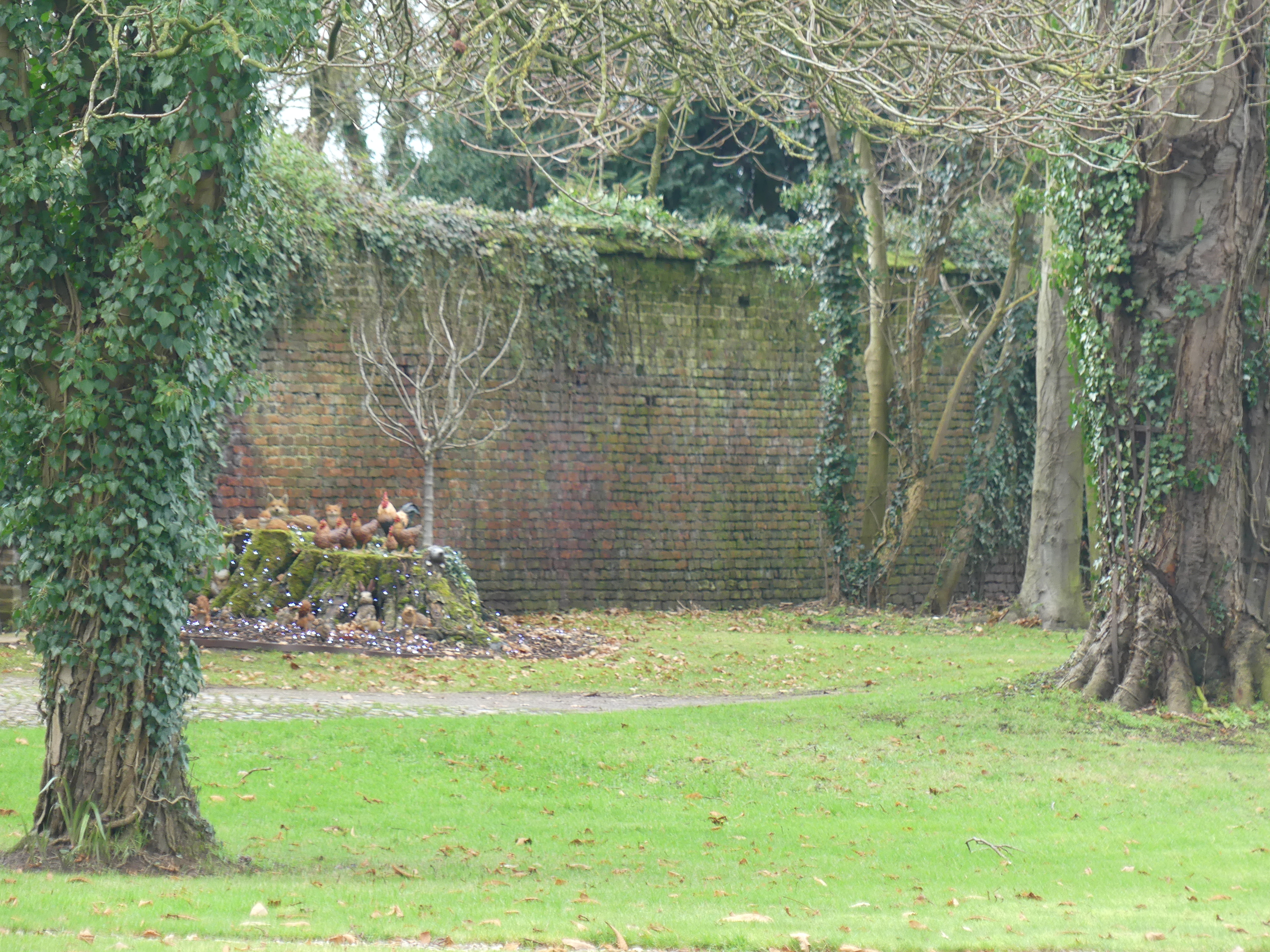
Garden wall

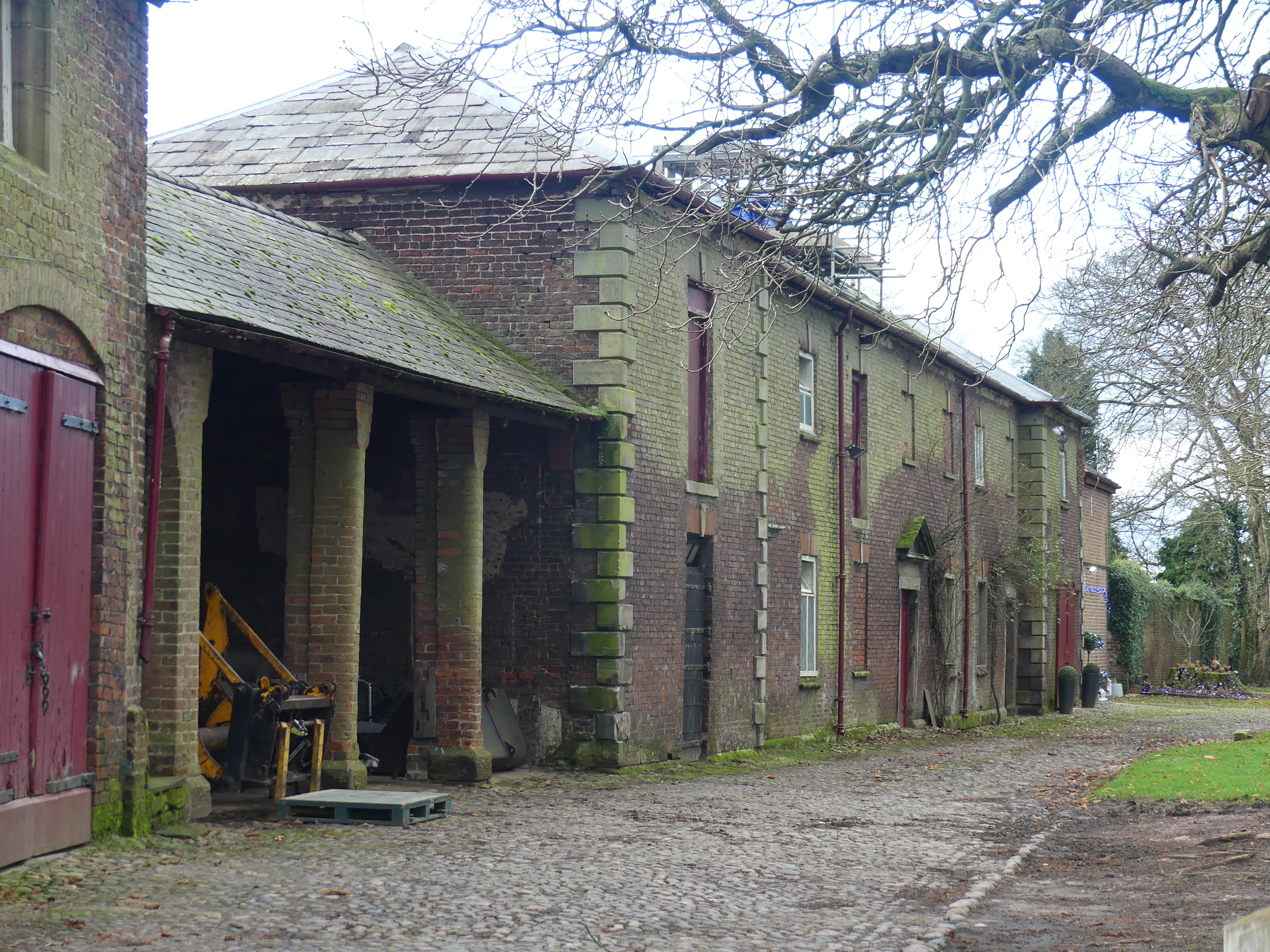
Stable

== See also ==
- Listed buildings in Ashley, Cheshire
