= Mobberley Old Hall =

The Old Hall
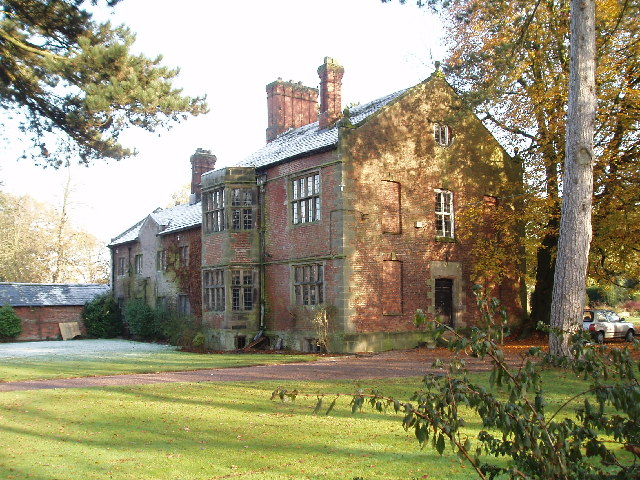
- Mobberley Old Hall from the west

- Location in Cheshire
- 53.31380°N 2.31292°W
- Location: Mobberley, Cheshire, England
- OS grid reference: SJ 792 797

History
- Built: 1612
- Built for: Robert Robinson

Site notes
- Architectural style: Jacobean

Listed Building – Grade II*
- Designated: 5 March 1959
- Reference no.: 1139557

The Old Hall is a country house in the village of Mobberley, Cheshire, England. It was built in 1612 and extended later in the 17th century. The house stands in gardens which retain part of the moat and ancient yew trees. The house is recorded in the National Heritage List for England as a designated Grade II* listed building, and the grounds contain two Grade II listed buildings.

== History ==
The house dates from the 17th century, and was built in two phases. The first stage was built in 1612 for Robert Robinson, the son of a Yorkshire wool merchant. This is now the service wing. The second stage is larger and grander, and was built later in the century, probably for Laurence Wright of Offerton. A barn was probably built at the same time, and is dated 1686. The house eventually passed to Jane Wright, who with her husband John Blakiston built a new house called Mobberley Hall in 1845; at which point the older house became known as Mobberley Old Hall. During the later part of the 19th century the house was owned by Rev Herbert Leigh Mallory, father of the mountaineer George Mallory, who sold it in 1900. In 1924 the house was bought by Miss Elsie H. Bishop. She died in 1955 and bequeathed it to Manchester University. The house was then rented by Professor John Frederick Wilkinson (1897–1998) and his wife Marion (née Crossfield, 1920–2003), until 2003. (They were married in 1964 but they separated in the 1990s.)

In the following year the house and its estate were bought by Mohammed Isaq. In 2005 they were purchased by a different buyer for £3 million.

== Architecture ==
The architectural historian Nikolaus Pevsner describes the plan of the house as being "irregular", and that it is "evidently only a fragment". Figueirdo and Treuherz note that the house does not have a "proper entrance front", and this suggests that "the house has been truncated or that it was intended to have been larger". The architectural style is Jacobean. The house is constructed in red and orange brick, with stone dressings, and has stone slate roofs. There are two storeys, plus an attic and a basement. The left hand portion of the northwest front dates from 1612 and consists of four bays with a central gable. The two bays at the right hand date from the later extension. This projects slightly and contains a two-storey semi-octagonal bay window. The south west front is symmetrical with three bays and a central arched doorway containing the entrance door.

== External features ==
The house stands in gardens that include lawns, a kitchen garden, a paved garden, and woodland. Part of the moat is still present, and the line of the rest of it is marked by an ancient yew hedge. Associated with the house are two structures that are designated by English Heritage as Grade II listed buildings. The barn dated 1686 is constructed in brick with stone dressings and has a stone slate roof. The wall and gate piers to the northwest of the house date from the 17th century. They are also constructed in brick, and have stone a coping.

== See also ==
- Grade II* listed buildings in Cheshire East
- Listed buildings in Mobberley
