= William Bromley-Davenport (Lord Lieutenant) =

British landowner (born 1935)

Sir William Arthur Bromley-Davenport, KCVO (born 7 March 1935) is a British landowner, accountant and public servant.

Born in 1935, he is the son of the politician and landowner Sir Walter Bromley-Davenport. He attended Cornell University and completed his national service as an officer in the Grenadier Guards. He became an accountant in 1966 and is a landowner, the owner of Capesthorne Hall.

Bromley-Davenport became a magistrate for Cheshire in 1975 and was appointed a deputy lieutenant in 1982; after serving as High Sheriff of Cheshire for the 1983–84 year, he served as Lord Lieutenant from 1990 to 2010. He was awarded an honorary doctorate in 2006 and in the 2010 New Year Honours he was appointed a Knight Commander of the Royal Victorian Order.
