= International Primate Protection League =

US non-profit organization

The International Primate Protection League (IPPL) is a not-for-profit animal welfare organization founded in 1973 in Thailand by Shirley McGreal.

IPPL's main focus is to promote the conservation and protection around the world of all non-human primates (NHP), including apes, monkeys, and lemurs. Coordinating an international network of 15,000 members, IPPL works to curb illegal primate trafficking, intervene in abusive practices, and encourage the efforts of sanctuaries and protection groups worldwide.

The organization's main headquarters and gibbon sanctuary was established in the United States in Summerville, South Carolina, in 1977. The now-disbanded British branch, IPPL-UK, was founded in 1977 by Cyril Rosen. As of 2019 IPPL is represented in 31 countries.

In countries where NHPs live, IPPL helps create and preserve national parks and sanctuaries and lobbies for bans on hunting and trapping. It raises money to fund sanctuaries, including one for gibbons obtained from research laboratories and zoos. In countries that import NHPs, IPPL monitors the trade and the conditions in which zoo and laboratory NHPs are kept. Over the years, IPPL has exposed illegal animal smuggling rings and poaching operations, as well as challenged major universities, corporations, and even the U.S. military regarding their treatment and use of NHPs.

== Foundation ==
Shirley McGreal founded IPPL in 1973 while living in Thailand. The new organization took a protective and advocatory stance for the world's primates, questioning and investigating the practices of many organizations involved in import/export, pet trade, transportation, and experimentation, as well as those who dealt in NHPs illegally, such as smugglers and poachers.

One of McGreal's first undertakings was to go undercover in Thailand, posing as a potential buyer of smuggled primates. The information she uncovered would later be published in Bangkok newspapers and by the Associated Press. She also worked with university students in Thailand to gather intelligence on living conditions of primates being exported from the country. She reported her findings to the prime minister, who banned the export of primates and many other mammals in 1979.

Between 1973 and 1976, McGreal worked with Indian Prime Minister Morarji Desai to ban the export of monkeys from India. This was after the Times of India ran an editorial based on press releases from IPPL calling for a ban on primate exports.

Bangladesh passed a similar ban shortly after IPPL exposed the practices of unscrupulous laboratories that were conducting experiments on monkeys to test the effects of radiation exposure by forcing the animals to perform on treadmills, then irradiating them and putting them back on the treadmills. The animals were collapsing on the machines and vomiting. One company had a contract with an American business to export 70,000 monkeys to the United States. The Bangladesh government expelled that company.

== Newsletter and membership ==
IPPL obtains support through annual memberships, sponsorship of rescued gibbons living at the Summerville IPPL gibbon sanctuary, and partnerships with other animal rights and not-for-profit organizations.

The organization publishes a newsletter, IPPL News, which it sends to donors.

As of 2019, the organization has a membership of over 15,000 worldwide.

== History ==
=== 1970s ===
- 1973: Founding.
- 1974: The first issue of IPPL News was published. IPPL exposed a network of smugglers that was shipping gibbons from Thailand to the United States and got it closed down.
- 1975: In Project Bangkok Airport, fifty Thai students worked at the airport documenting the conditions under which wildlife was being exported. The result was a ban on export of all primates from Thailand.
- 1976: IPPL uncovered "The Singapore Connection", a network through which legally protected primates were smuggled from Thailand, Malaysia, or Indonesia via Singapore and on to the West with Singaporean export documents. IPPL's campaign resulted in shutting down this illegal trade.
- 1977: IPPL exposed the fate of rhesus monkeys exported from India to the United States for use in radiation experiments. IPPL's protests to the Indian press and authorities led India to ban all primate exports.
- 1978: After the death of a chimpanzee at the hands of surgeon Christiaan Barnard during the development of heart transplantation, IPPL organized a worldwide protest. A second chimp slated for a heart transplantation experiment was removed and sent to a zoo.
- 1979: IPPL exposed the use of monkeys from Bangladesh in U.S. military radiation experiments. Bangladesh canceled plans to export more than 70,000 monkeys.

=== 1980s ===
- 1980: IPPL took legal action that resulted in the closing of a U.S. government laboratory in California that was using baby gibbons. Many of the animals had been smuggled into the country from Thailand.
- 1982: IPPL publicized the U.S. military's biological warfare experiments on primates and started a campaign to persuade countries that were supplying monkeys to U.S. labs (including Malaysia and Indonesia) to ban primate exports.
- 1983: IPPL's Belgian representative, Roland Corluy, infiltrated the operations of the Belgian smuggler George Munro and found a cache of endangered primates, including bonobos, in the animal dealer's basement. IPPL press contributed to Belgium establish laws banning wildlife trafficking.
- 1984: IPPL successfully fought plans by three U.S. zoos to import seven wild-caught gorillas from Cameroon. These animals were being offered for sale by the Miami animal dealer Matthew Block. In addition, after years of IPPL protests about the misuse of Malaysian monkeys in military research, Malaysia banned monkey exports.
- 1985: IPPL secured the release to a sanctuary of four chimpanzees sent to a lab run by toxicologist Fred Coulston after their circus trainer died.
- 1986: IPPL field representative Bernadette Bresard found that a Japanese laboratory was keeping monkeys continuously in metal restraint chairs. IPPL's protests led to the monkeys' being removed from the chairs. Following the murder of IPPL member Dian Fossey, IPPL raised funds to help continue Fossey's crusade to protect mountain gorillas from poachers in Rwanda.
- 1987: IPPL investigated the smuggling of three baby gorillas from Cameroon to Taiwan. Only one baby arrived alive. IPPL's work led to prosecutions of the criminals in several countries. The head of the smuggling operation, Walter Sensen, was expelled from Cameroon and later imprisoned in Germany.
- 1988: IPPL investigated the conditions of primates living in Cuban zoos. IPPL founder Shirley McGreal won the Jeanne Marchig Award for her efforts to protect primates around the world.
- 1989: IPPL uncovered "The Polish Connection", by which animals were being smuggled into Polish zoos and then re-exported with false "captive-born" documents to the West. Poland put a stop to these activities and joined the Convention on International Trade in Endangered Species.

=== 1990s ===
- 1990: Six smuggled baby orangutans were confiscated at Bangkok Airport. IPPL identified the leader of the smuggling ring as Matthew Block of Miami and requested a U.S. government criminal investigation. IPPL's investigative work also led to the jailing of the German gorilla smuggler Walter Sensen.
- 1991: IPPL learned that two baby gibbons were on sale at a market in the Philippines. IPPL's protests led to the animals' being returned to Thailand.
- 1992: An IPPL team testified before a congressional committee about the U.S. government's failure to prosecute Miami wildlife smuggler Matthew Block. On learning that the U.S. government had offered him a misdemeanor plea bargain, IPPL members flooded the judge with protests. The judge rejected the plea deal and sentenced the animal dealer to 13 months in prison. Shirley McGreal was chosen for the United Nations Global 500 Roll of Honour for Environmental Achievement.
- 1993: IPPL's undercover detectives filmed the illegal trade in wildlife in the street markets along the borders of Vietnam and China.
- 1994: IPPL learned of nine chimpanzees in pet shops in Saudi Arabia. Following a letter-writing campaign by IPPL supporters, these animals were confiscated and sent to Riyadh Zoo.
- 1995: IPPL uncovered a Pakistani organization that was smuggling endangered primates (including gorillas) from Nigeria to the Philippines.
- 1996: IPPL ran a fundraising campaign for the Limbe Wildlife Centre in Cameroon, which houses gorillas, chimpanzees, and monkeys rescued from the trade in bush meat and pet primates.
- 1997: IPPL learned that hundreds of monkeys from Indonesia had reached Chicago Airport and that the shipments contained pregnant monkeys, nursing monkeys, and baby monkeys three to four weeks old, in violation of U.S. law. As a result of IPPL's campaign, the company, its president, and two officials were indicted, and the company was fined $500,000.
- 1998: IPPL raised over $35,000 to support Cameroon's Limbe Wildlife Centre.
- 1999: IPPL worked with the grassroots Indonesian animal protection group KSBK (now known as ProFauna Indonesia) to block the export of dozens of proboscis monkeys poached from an Indonesian nature reserve and sent to Surabaya Zoo, where many of them died. Five of the surviving monkeys were returned to the wild.

=== 2000s ===
- 2000: IPPL investigated a shipment of twelve black-and-white colobus monkeys smuggled from Tanzania to Thailand, where five of the monkeys died.
- 2001: IPPL organized an international protest over the drowning by Egyptian authorities of a baby gorilla and baby chimpanzee smuggled from Nigeria into Egypt. IPPL's protests led EgyptAir to ban further primate shipments.
- 2002: IPPL learned that four baby gorillas had reached Taiping Zoo, Malaysia, from Ibadan Zoo in Nigeria, on documents falsely claiming that the animals were captive born. IPPL publicity resulted in the confiscation of the gorillas by Malaysian authorities.
- 2003: IPPL provided information to a Nigerian presidential panel investigating the illegal wildlife trade in that country. Britain's Prince Philip sent IPPL a letter congratulating IPPL on its 30th anniversary.
- 2004: IPPL inspected a zoo in Thonburi, Thailand. Among the hundreds of animals kept in substandard conditions there were gorillas, orangutans, chimpanzees, gibbons, and monkeys. IPPL started a campaign to close the facility.
- 2005: A baby orangutan was discovered at a pet shop in Riyadh, Saudi Arabia. IPPL asked members to send protest letters to Saudi authorities, which resulted in the government confiscating the animal.
- 2006: IPPL constructed new gibbon housing on five acres of newly acquired land at Headquarters Sanctuary in South Carolina.
- 2007: IPPL marked the return of four gorillas to a sanctuary in their native Cameroon.
- 2008: Shirley McGreal was presented with the Order of the British Empire "for services to the protection of primates" by Queen Elizabeth II.
- 2009: IPPL arranged to have a Nepalese mountaineer summit Mount Everest, where he unfurled a banner reading "Stop the Monkey Business! Don't export Nepali monkeys to American labs." Three months later, the Nepal government announced a decision to release 300 captive rhesus monkeys from an export facility and to maintain Nepal's longstanding ban on exporting its native primates.

=== 2010s ===
- 2011: IPPL had been collaborating with Wildlife Watch Group in Nepal since 2006 to protect that country's native rhesus monkeys. After working successfully against two proposed "monkey farms", WWG unveiled plans to establish Nepal's first wildlife sanctuary, to be named in honor of Shirley McGreal.
- 2013: In November the new Malaysian Minister for Natural Resources and Environment suspended the culling of his nation's monkeys, a program that had killed nearly 200,000 wild macaques, after he received petition signatures gathered by IPPL.

== See also ==
- Great Ape Project
