= Mobberley =

Village in Cheshire, England

Coordinates: 53.3134°N 2.3263°W

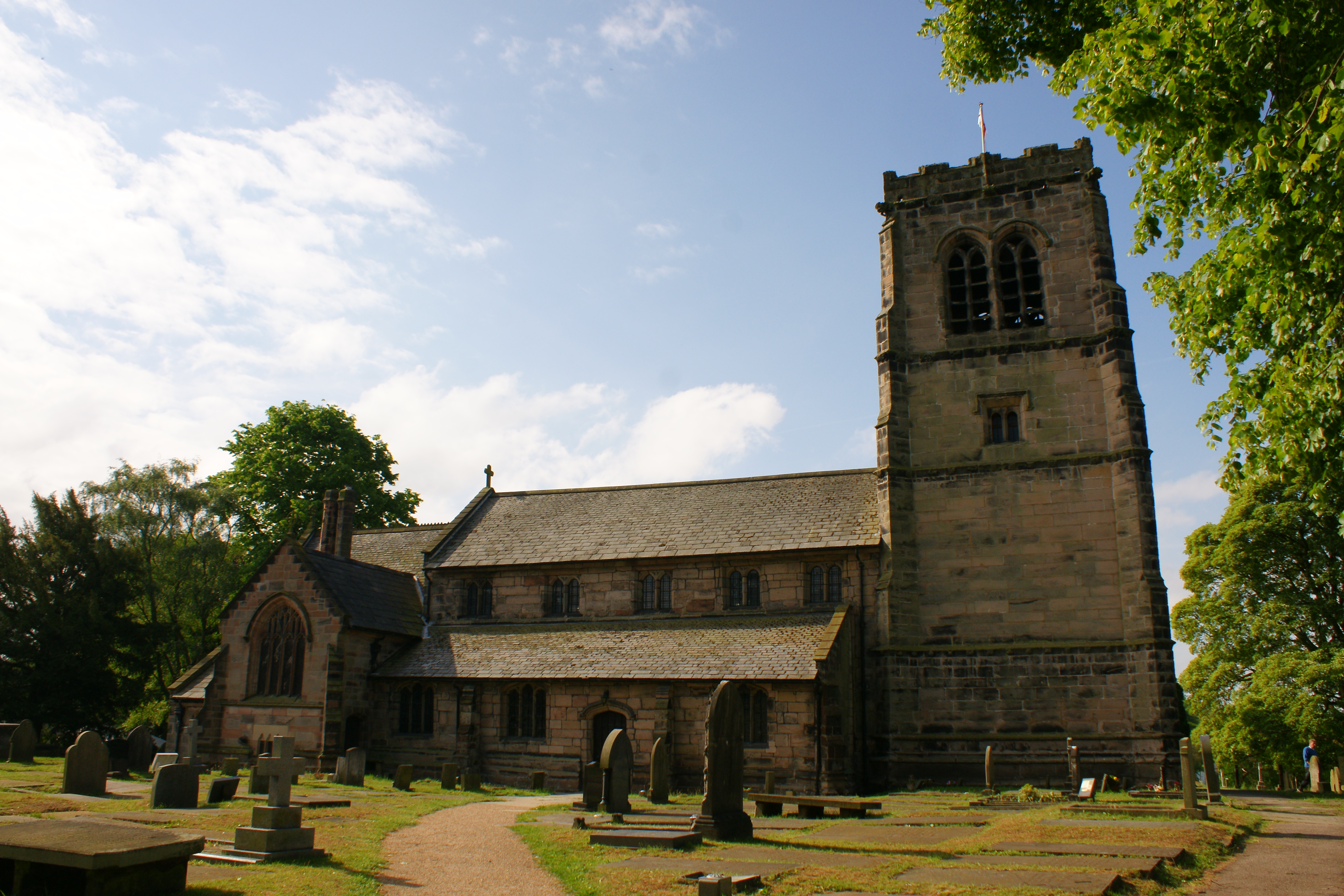
- St Wilfrid's Church

- Location within Cheshire
- Population: 3,119
- OS grid reference: SJ782797
- Civil parish: Mobberley
- Unitary authority: Cheshire East
- Ceremonial county: Cheshire
- Region: North West
- Country: England
- Sovereign state: United Kingdom
- Post town: KNUTSFORD
- Postcode district: WA16
- Dialling code: 01565
- Police: Cheshire
- Fire: Cheshire
- Ambulance: North West
- UK Parliament: Tatton

Mobberley is a village in Cheshire, England, between Wilmslow and Knutsford. In 2001, it had a population of 2,546, increasing to 3,050 at the 2011 census, and to 3,119 in 2021.

== History ==
Mobberley is mentioned, as Motburlege, in the Domesday Book of 1086. A priory was located here.

The parish church, St Wilfrid's, was mainly constructed around 1245. It was originally dedicated to both St Wilfrid and St Mary although in recent years St Mary has been "dropped".

Hill House is a 17th-century black and white timbered framed house that was originally in Woodlane Mobberley. It was the home of the Bacon family. The house was deconstructed and rebuilt on Nursery Lane in Nether Alderley to avoid destruction by the building of the second runway at Manchester Airport. The Grade-II-listed Hanson House, formerly the home of the Riddick family, was similarly relocated due to the runway construction, and is now on Moss Lane, Siddington. Antrobus Hall was built in 1709.

Mobberley was the home of the Mallory family: George Mallory (1886–1924), a mountaineer who died attempting Mount Everest, and Air Chief Marshal Sir Trafford Leigh-Mallory (1892–1944), who was air commander for the Allied Invasion of Normandy during World War II were both born in Mobberley. Their father, The Rev. Herbert Leigh Mallory, was rector of Mobberley.

The Victory Hall was built in 1921 as a World War I memorial at a cost of £4,500 on a plot of three quarters of an acre given by Mr R O Leycester. It was officially opened on 30 December 1921 and was refurbished in 1992. It is also home to many village organisations including the Women's Institute, Village Society and playgroup and is a regular place for locals – and wider – to hold a variety of celebrations and meetings.

Mobberley has seen much change in recent years: first the opening of the nearby M56 from Manchester to Chester and then the Second Runway at Manchester Airport. These developments have led to Mobberley becoming largely a dormitory village of Manchester. Mobberley is well served by pubs.

Mobberley is mentioned in the opening chapter of the children's fantasy novel The Weirdstone of Brisingamen (1960) by Alan Garner.

== Transport ==
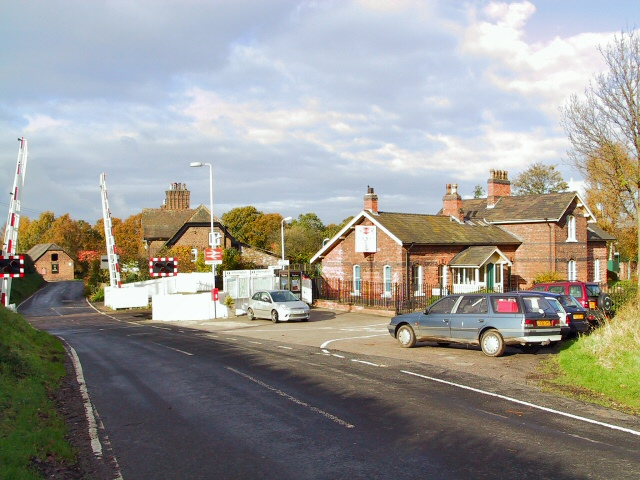
The railway station entrance

Mobberley railway station is a stop on the Mid-Cheshire line. Northern Trains operate generally hourly stopping services in both directions between Manchester Piccadilly, Stockport and Chester; on Sundays, the service reduces to two-hourly.

== Sport ==
Mobberley has a cricket club which plays at Church Lane. The first team competes in Division Two of the Cheshire County Cricket League; it also has second and third teams, and a junior section.

Crown green bowls and snooker are played at the Victory Hall Memorial Club.

== Notable people ==
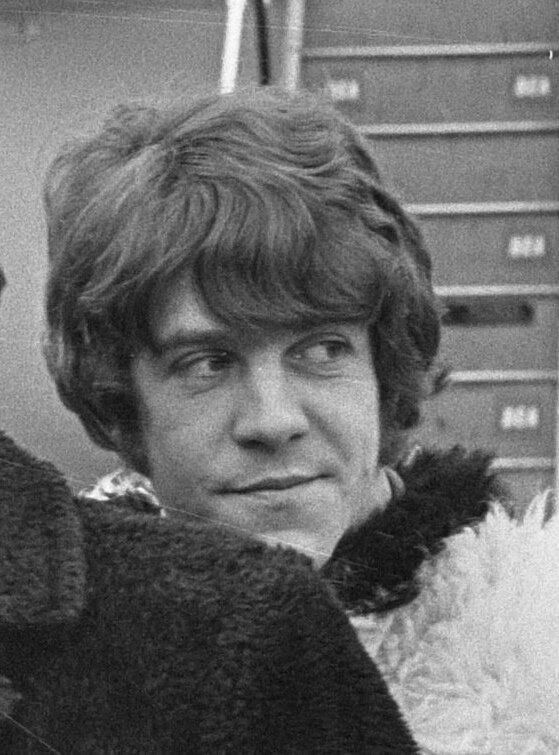
Dave Dee, 1967

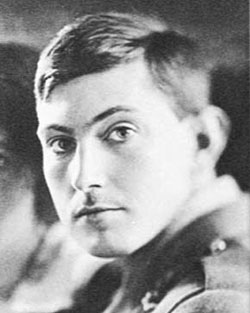
George Mallory, 1916

- Thomas Assheton Smith (1752–1828), landowner, politician, all-round sportsman who developed the slate industry in Wales
- Sir Robert Noton Barclay (1872–1957), shipping merchant, banker, politician and Lord Mayor of Manchester, lived at Mobberley Hall
- Sir Trafford Leigh-Mallory (1892–1944), Royal Air Force Air Chief Marshal, he served as a Royal Flying Corps pilot and squadron commander during the First World War.
- Shirley McGreal (1934–2021), animal welfare activist and conservationist, she founded the International Primate Protection League
- Dave Dee (1941–2009), lead vocalist for the 1960s pop band Dave Dee, Dozy, Beaky, Mick & Tich (formerly Dave Dee & the Bostons).
- David Briggs (born 1946}, businessman who served as the Lord Lieutenant of Cheshire until August 2021, has lived at Dukenfield Hall in Mobberley since 1987.

=== Sport ===
- George Mallory (1886 – 1924), mountaineer who participated in the first three British Mount Everest expeditions in the early 1920s.
- John Hulme (1945–2008), footballer and manager who played 369 games
- Chris Farnell (born 1969), sports lawyer, lives in Mobberley.
- Philip "Pip" Cartner (born 1984), a British professional wrestler, ring name Bubblegum.
- Kadeena Cox (born 1991), British Olympian and Paralympian in both sprinting and cycling.

== See also ==
- Listed buildings in Mobberley
- Mobberley Old Hall
- Newton Hall, Mobberley
