= Listed buildings in Ringway, Manchester =

Ringway is a civil parish in Manchester, England. It contains five listed buildings that are recorded in the National Heritage List for England. All the listed buildings are designated at Grade II, the lowest of the three grades, which is applied to "buildings of national importance and special interest". The parish is almost completely occupied by Manchester Airport and its approach roads, and what otherwise remains is rural. The listed buildings consist of houses and a bridge.

== Buildings ==
Name and location	Photograph	Date	Notes
Cloughbank Farmhouse; 53.35520°N 2.28556°W		17th century	The farmhouse was largely rebuilt in the following centuries, but it retains some timber framing. It is in brick with a roof partly of slate and partly of stone-slate. There are two storeys, and two bays. On the front is a 20th-century porch, and most of the windows are casements. Inside is an inglenook and a bressumer.
Haletop Farm; 53.37130°N 2.28394°W		17th century	A farmhouse later divided into two cottages, it is timber framed, encased in brick and has a slate roof. There are two storeys and three bays, two doorways on the front, and casement windows.
Rose Cottage; 53.36612°N 2.29297°W		17th century	A brick cottage with a thatched roof that was altered in the 20th century. There are two storeys and three bays, and rear additions. In the front is a 20th-century porch and the windows have been replaced, on the ground floor with bow windows, and on the upper floor with casements. Above the upper floor windows the thatch is eyebrowed, and inside the cottage is a bressumer.
Yewtree House; 53.35615°N 2.30335°W		Mid-18th century	Originally a farmhouse, later a private house, it is in brick with stone dressings and a slate roof. The house has a double-depth plan, two storeys with an attic, and three bays. The central bay projects forward above a stone plinth and contains a doorway with a stone architrave, a fanlight, and a tripartite keystone. The windows are replacement casements with keystones, and in front of the house is a coped stone wall.
Ashley Castle Mill Bridge; 53.35077°N 2.30347°W		Late 18th to 19th century	The bridge carries Mill Lane over the River Bollin. It is in stone, and consists of a single segmental arch with a span of about 25 feet (7.6 m). The bridge has voussoirs and a stone parapet.
