= Normans Hall =

Country house in Prestbury, Cheshire, England

Coordinates: 53.28302°N 2.16934°W

Normans Hall is a Tudor house which stands to the southwest of the village of Prestbury, Cheshire, England. It is an L-shaped house, the south range dating from the 16th century. Additions were made in the 17th century, and repairs were carried out in the early 18th century. The east range was built in 1921 for H. B. Crook, and was designed by Henry Boddington. The south range is partly timber-framed, and partly brick, standing on a stone plinth. The east wing is in brick, with a timber-framed gabled bay dated 1921 at the junction of the ranges. The roofs are in Kerridge stone slate. The hall is recorded in the National Heritage List for England (NHLE) as a designated Grade II listed building.

== See also ==
- Listed buildings in Prestbury, Cheshire
