= Willot Hall =

Country house in Cheshire, England

Coordinates: 53.31933°N 2.16926°W

Willot Hall is a country house in the parish of Prestbury, some 4.5 km to the east of Wilmslow, Cheshire, England. It originated as a medieval hall house in the later part of the 15th century. This was encased in stone in the 17th century. Later in the century, a service wing was added. The house was restored and extended between 1933 and 1939, moving the entrance and reopening the great hall to the roof. It is constructed partly in buff sandstone rubble and partly in brick, with Kerridge stone slate roofs. It is in 2½ storeys, with a four-bay entrance front, the left bay being larger than the others. The left bay contains mullioned windows and is gabled. The other bays contain a doorway, smaller mullioned windows, and gabled dormers. The house is recorded in the National Heritage List for England (NHLE) as a designated Grade II* listed building.

== See also ==
- Grade II* listed buildings in Cheshire East
- Listed buildings in Prestbury, Cheshire
