= Legh Hall =

Coordinates: 53.30086°N 2.17433°W

Legh Hall stands to the east of the village of Mottram St Andrew, Cheshire, England. It was built in the middle of the 18th century for William Brocklehurst of Macclesfield. The house was built to replace Legh Old Hall. Additions were made in the late 19th century, with alterations in the 20th century. The house is constructed in red brick with yellow headers. It is roofed with Welsh slate. Its architectural style is Georgian. The house is in 2½ storeys, and has a symmetrical five-bay front. It is recorded in the National Heritage List for England as a designated Grade II listed building.

== See also ==
- Listed buildings in Mottram St Andrew
