= Legh Old Hall =

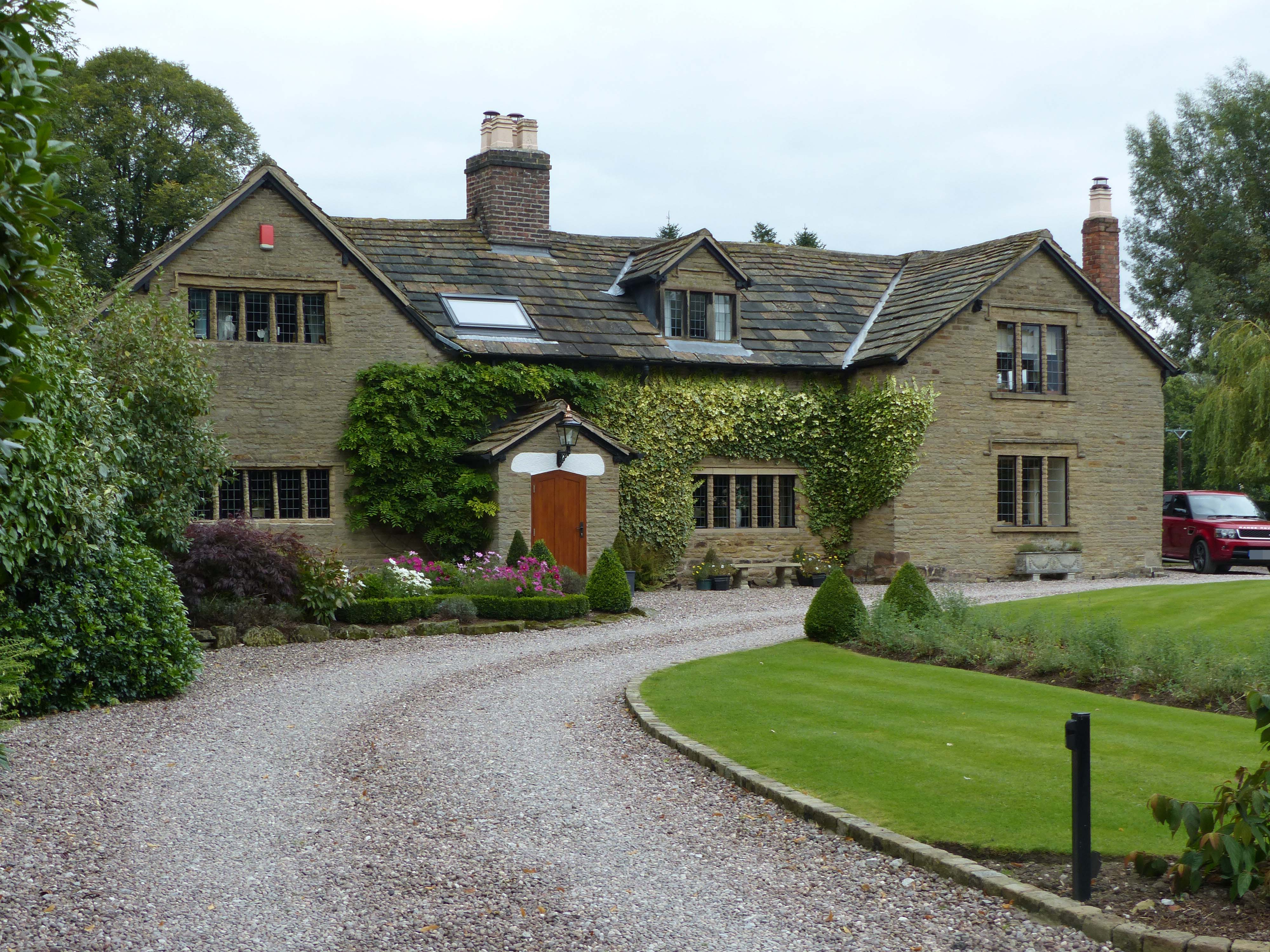

- Location in Cheshire
- 53.30077°N 2.17385°W
- Location: Mottram St. Andrew, Cheshire, England

Listed Building – Grade II
- Official name: Legh Hall Cottage
- Designated: 6 July 1984
- Reference no.: 1234773

Legh Old Hall stands to the east of the village of Mottram St Andrew, Cheshire, England. It was built in the later part of the 16th century, with rebuilding in the 17th century. Alterations were made during the 20th century. It is constructed in coursed buff sandstone rubble, and has a Kerridge stone-slate roof. The house has an H plan. It is in two storeys, with a four-bay front. The house was replaced by Legh Hall. It is recorded in the National Heritage List for England as a designated house Grade II listed building.

== See also ==
- Listed buildings in Mottram St Andrew
