= Motorhead (disambiguation) =

Motörhead was an English rock band.

Motorhead may also refer to:

== Music ==
- Motörhead (album), their 1977 debut album
- "Motorhead" (song), recorded by Hawkwind and Motörhead
- Jim "Motorhead" Sherwood, an American art rock musician in The Mothers of Invention

== Other uses ==
- Motorhead (video game), a 1998 motor racing video game
- Motorhead (comics), a Dark Horse Comics series and character

== See also ==
- "Motorhead Baby", a 1952 song by Johnny "Guitar" Watson
- Mottershead
