= St Peter's Church, Prestbury =

St Peter's Church
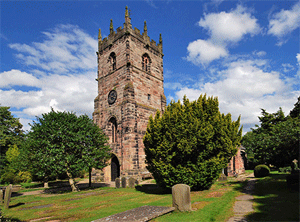
- St Peter's Church from the southwest in 2007
- St Peter's Church
- 53.2893°N 2.15025°W
- OS grid reference: SJ 90064 76931
- Location: Prestbury, Cheshire
- Country: England
- Denomination: Church of England
- Churchmanship: Mixed
- Website: stpetersprestbury.org.uk

History
- Status: Parish church
- Dedication: St Peter

Architecture
- Functional status: Active
- Heritage designation: Grade I
- Designated: 14 April 1967
- Architectural type: Church
- Style: Gothic

Specifications
- Materials: Ashlar buff and pink sandstone, Kerridge stone-slate roof

Administration
- Province: York
- Diocese: Chester
- Archdeaconry: Macclesfield
- Deanery: Macclesfield

Clergy
- Vicar: Rev Patrick Angier

St Peter's Church is the parish church of Prestbury, Cheshire, England. It is probably the fourth church on the site. The third, the Norman Chapel, stands in the churchyard. The church is recorded in the National Heritage List for England (NHLE) as a designated Grade I listed building. The Norman Chapel, the lychgate and west wall, the Hearse House, and the sundial in the churchyard are listed at Grade II. It is a Church of England parish church in the Diocese of Chester, the archdeaconry of Macclesfield, and the deanery of Macclesfield.

== History ==
There is compelling evidence that there was a church at Prestbury ("priest’s enclosure") in the Anglo-Saxon era. After the Norman Conquest of England, the church, probably the second on the site, came into the possession of the powerful baron Hugh Kyvelioc who gave it to the Abbey of St Werburgh in 1170–1173.

The monks demolished the Anglo-Saxon church and built what is now called the Norman Chapel. The chapel served as a place of worship for the vast Parish of Prestbury until after Magna Carta and the deaths of King John and Pope Innocent III in 1216.

In 1220, the monks, supported by the Davenports of Marton (and later Henbury), the Piggots of Butley and the family de Corona (predecessors of the Leghs of Adlington) started to build what became the chancel and nave of the present church. Rather than incorporate the chapel into the new building, as was often done, they left it in the churchyard. Sometime later, it was given to the Davenports for use as a place of burial and perhaps as a private chapel.

During the next three centuries, the church was enlarged and the tower was erected. As a Roman Catholic church, worship in Latin was conducted at the high altar behind the rood screen. Rich vestments and ornaments were in use.

With the dissolution of the monasteries, the Abbey of St Werburgh ceased to exist. The newly created Diocese of Chester (1541) administered Prestbury until Sir Richard Cotton purchased the manor and advowson in 1547. A few years afterwards, in 1580, Thomas Legh of Adlington acquired the manor and advowson and became Lay Rector of Prestbury. The Legh family has held the manor and advowson of Prestbury ever since.

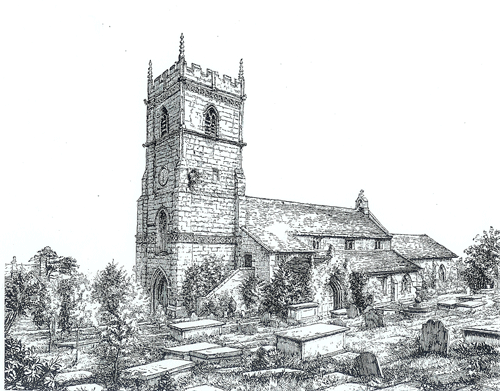
St Peter's Church before the general restoration

Public worship in Latin was abolished by the Acts of Uniformity. A pulpit was erected in 1560. The high altar and the rood loft were taken down during the years 1563–1572 and a moveable Communion table was set up.

The church was transformed during the Georgian period to suit the contemporaneous style of worship. Pews (1707) filled the building. In 1710 a canopied three-decker pulpit was erected in the nave. Between 1711 and 1712, a large gallery was built at the western end of the church, with access from external staircases on both sides of the tower. A ceiling was put up in 1719 and decorated in 1720. In 1741–1742, the north aisle was rebuilt.

In a general restoration designed by Sir George Gilbert Scott which took place between 1879 and 1888, the pews were replaced, the three-decker pulpit was dismantled, the gallery and the ceiling were removed and the north aisle was again rebuilt.

Further changes took place during the 20th and the first few years of the 21st centuries and no doubt will continue to take place.

== Churchyard ==
The Lychgate was built in 1715 and re-sited to its present position in 1728.

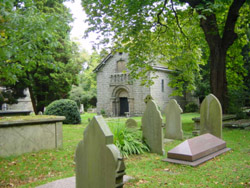
St Peter's Churchyard in 2007

The outstanding feature of the churchyard is the Norman Chapel. Dating from 1175 to 1190, it began to fall into disrepair a few years after the present church came into use. In 1747 it was rebuilt by Sir William Meredith of Henbury so that his son Amos and other members of his family could be buried there. Restored in 1953, it is now used for a variety of church purposes.

Fragments of a cross of late Saxon origin were discovered in about 1880 built into the wall of the church. At one time they were thought to date from the late seventh or early eighth centuries, but are now believed to be 10th or 11th century. Pieces of the cross have been put together and now stand inside the Norman Chapel. It has been registered as a scheduled monument.

Yew trees in the churchyard date from the time of the Hundred Years' War.

The sundial (needed to correct the church clock) dates from 1672. It was improved in 1771 but the gnomon is missing.

The forerunner of the Hearse House was built in 1728. The present Hearse House dates from 1852. It is used to store garden tools.

The churchyard contains the war graves of twelve Commonwealth service personnel, seven from the First World War and five from the Second World War.

Listed buildings in Prestbury churchyard

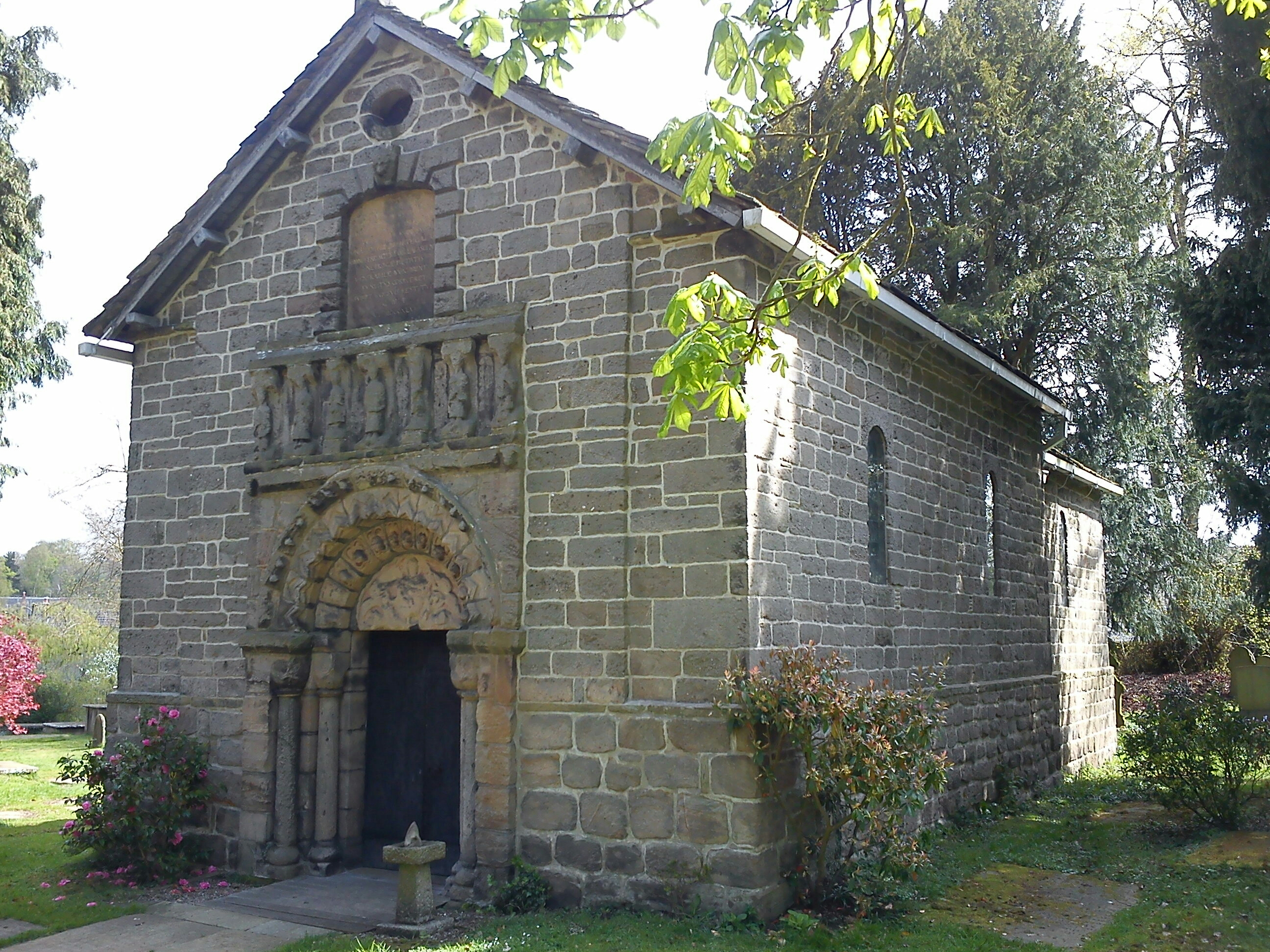
Norman Chapel

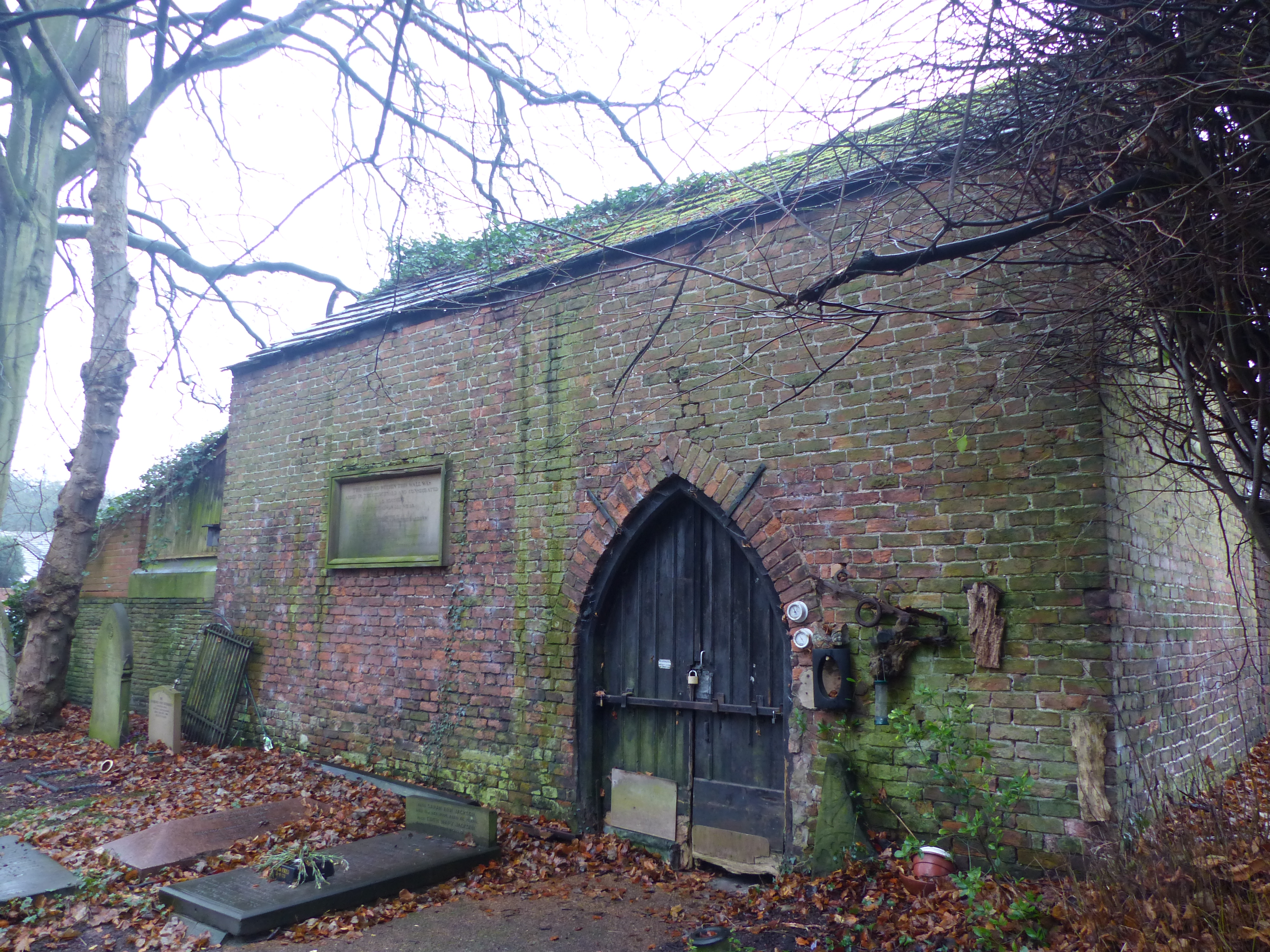
Hearse house

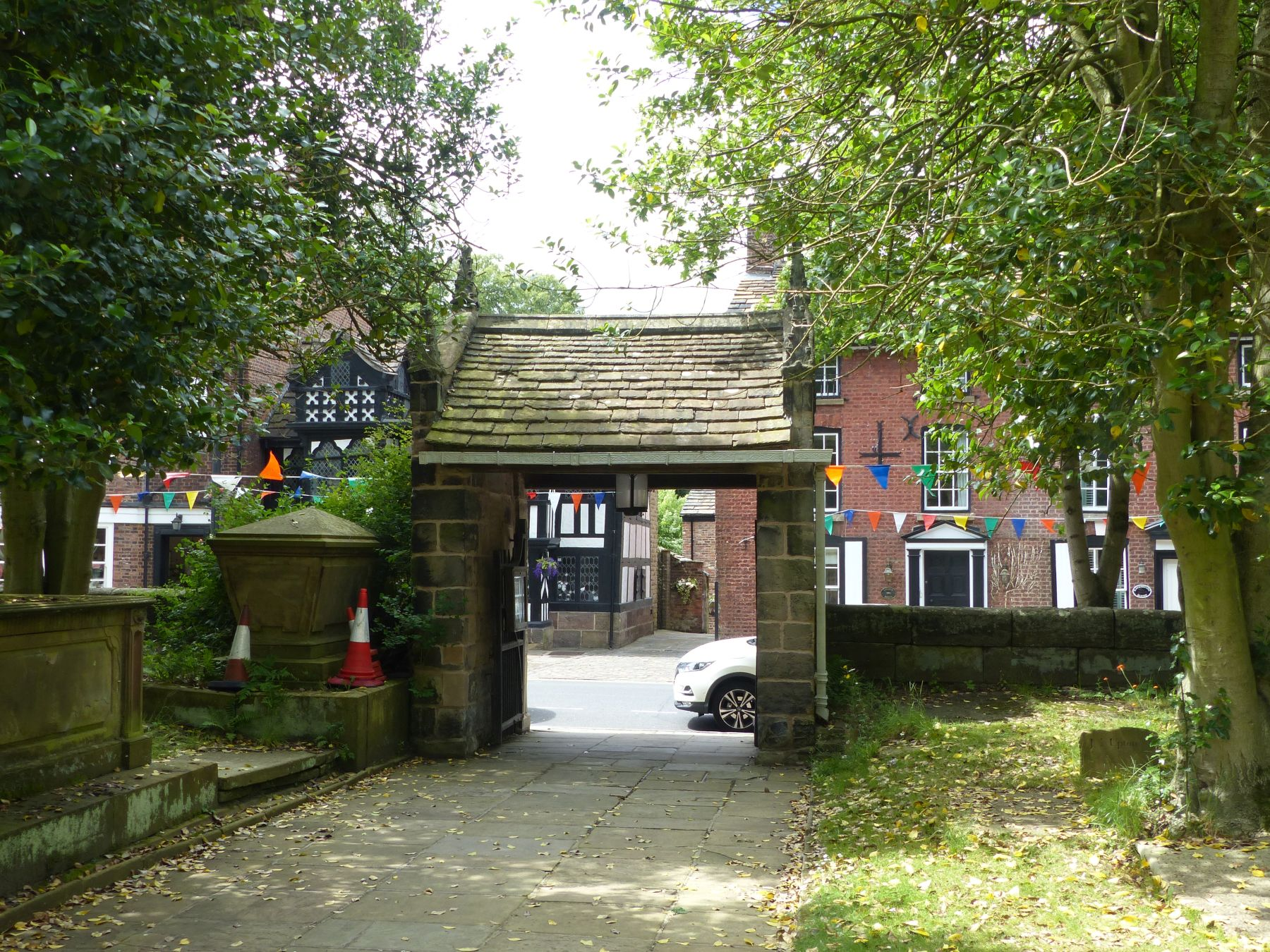
Lych gate and west wall

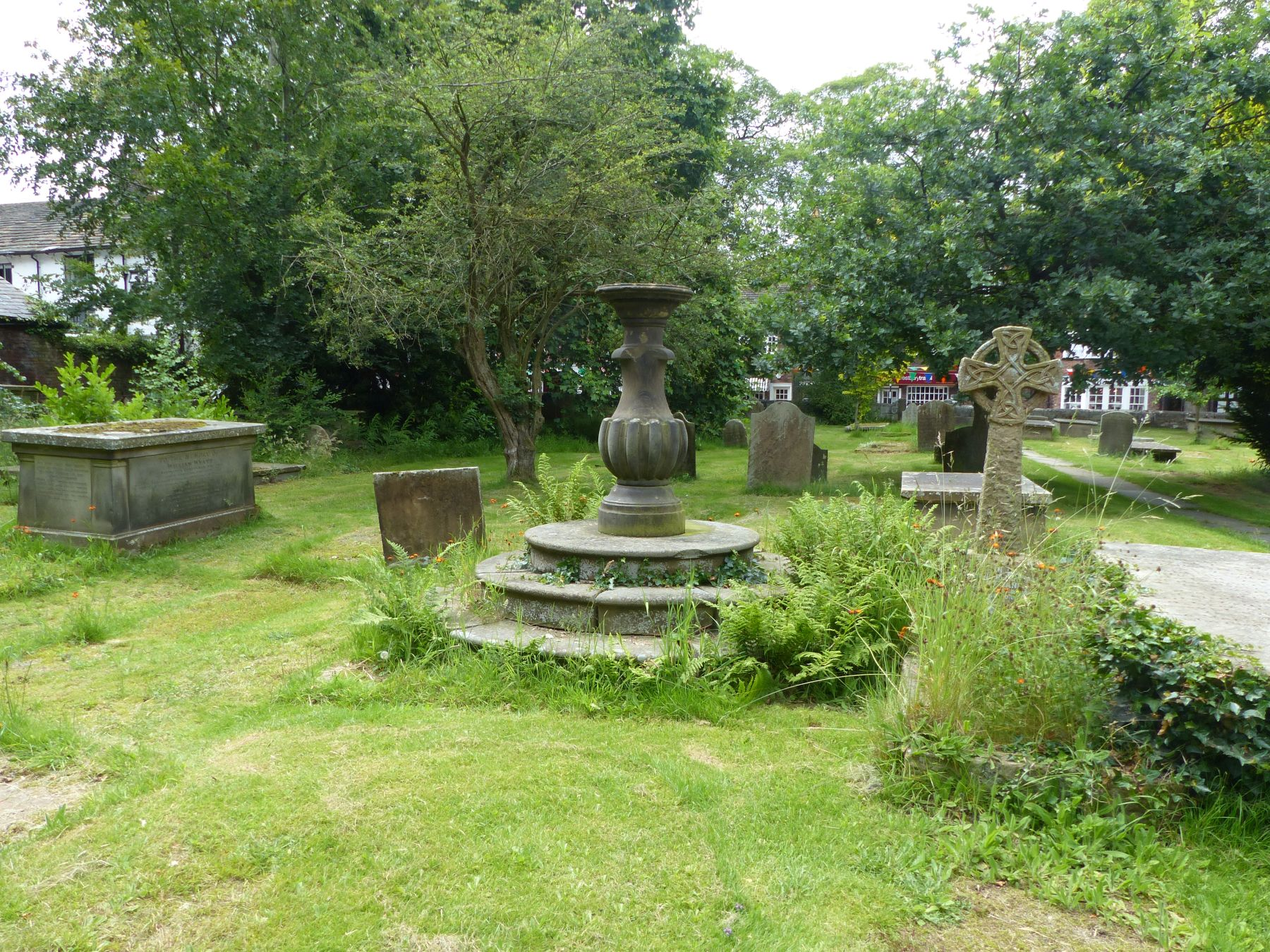
Sundial

== Church building ==
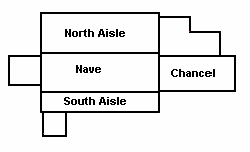
Ground plan

The nave is twenty-two feet wide. The north aisle and the south aisle are twenty-one and ten feet wide respectively. The chancel is nineteen feet wide. The south porch is fifteen feet square. The tower is twenty-three feet square with walls four feet thick. It is seventy-two feet high.

The main body of the church (the nave and chancel) was built during 1220–1230 in the Early English style. The south Aisle and the first north aisle were added in 1310.

The tower and south porch were built around 1480 and are the only parts of the building to survive in essentially their original form.

The clerestory with four windows each side and the bell-cot are early 16th century.

In 1612 three of the four 14th-century windows in the south aisle were replaced by square windows.

The 1741-42 north aisle had five round-headed windows which contrasted with the windows of the south aisle. Two of the round-headed windows survived the general restoration of 1879–1888.

The vestry to the north of the chancel was added during the general restoration of 1879–1888.

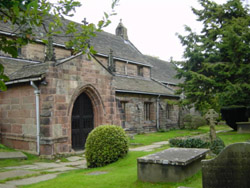
South Porch and South Aisle in 2007

=== Interior ===
The main west door leads through the West Porch, the Parish's memorial to the dead of the two World Wars.

Above the porch is the ringers' gallery (1637). It was formerly an organ loft. The bells date from 1820. They were recast in 1968.

==== Nave ====
Warden's pews at the west end of the nave survived the general restoration.

The roof (1675) replaced an earlier one. The timbering is rough as it was not designed to be exposed.

The nave chandelier is dated 1814. Electric lighting replaced acetylene gas in 1936. Ancient candle brackets remain on the pillars and the south wall.

Paintings above the pillars represent the twelve apostles and the twelve tribes of Israel. They were executed in 1719 by the travelling painter who had decorated the 18th-century ceiling which was removed as part of the general restoration.

The pulpit is Jacobean (1607). It was found in 1858 encased in the three-decker pulpit which had been made in 1710. It had replaced the 1560 pulpit.

A fragment of heraldic glass from an early window in the Legh chapel (1601) is now kept in an illuminated cabinet at the west end of the nave, near a memorial book remembering those who lost their lives in the two World Wars.

In 2001 a three-manual Allen Renaissance Digital Organ was installed to replace the pipe organ. At the same time a dais was installed with space for a nave communion table.

==== Chancel ====
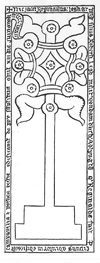
Incised slab commemorating Reginald Legh

The chancel is entered through a screen which had been erected in 1740 for the Legh Chapel. It has borne the Hanoverian Arms since 1787.

A memorial slab built into the north wall of the sanctuary is the oldest memorial in the church (1482). It commemorates Reginald Legh who helped to build the tower and south porch. This and other slabs were built into the walls when the church was cleared of altar-tombs.

The two-tier chandelier in the chancel is dated 1712.

The east window (1915) represents the river and tree of life as described in Revelations, 22: 1–2. It replaced an earlier window which had been inserted sixty years previously.

A 13th-century, three-light window in the north side of the chancel is filled with simulated organ pipes.

The main window in the south of the chancel has a representation of Christ's call of St Peter. It was inserted in 1981. Most of the other glass in the church dates from 1882 to 1896.

==== North aisle ====
The 13th-century font at the west end of the aisle was refaced and recut in 1857. The sculptured heads may represent monks or lay brothers from the Abbey of St Werburgh.

At the east end of the north aisle is the Legh Chantry Chapel, separated from the rest of the aisle by a heavy oak screen.

==== South aisle ====
At the east end of the south aisle, the Tytherington Chantry Chapel, dedicated to St Nicholas, was created in 1350. A 14th-century piscina with a carved head typical of the period projects from the wall.

A small figure of St Nicholas at the top of the east window of the south aisle is 14th century, the oldest piece of glass in the church.

== Vicars of Prestbury ==
- 1230 Master Hugh
- 1275 Walter de Kent
- 1300 Walter de Norton
- 1320 John Secular
- 1350 Richard Pygott
- 1360 John de Bellerby
- 1369 Richard de Bontable
- 1377 John del Schagh
- 1416 John Duncalf
- 1448 Nicholas Byrd
- 1468 Richard Broadhurst
- 1475 Richard Smyth
- 1512 John Parsons
- 1530 Ralph Green
- 1559 Edmund Newson
- 1584 John Booth
- 1627 Thomas Jeynson
- 1667 William Shippen
- 1675 George Newton
- 1691 Benjamin Spanne
- 1693 William Foxlowe
- 1722 Joseph Lowe
- 1733 Edward Darell
- 1738 Joseph Ward
- 1772 Peter Mayer
- 1786 John Watson
- 1800 John Rowlls Browne
- 1843 Henry Pearson
- 1858 Stephen Lea Wilson
- 1889 Reginald Edmund Broughton
- 1929 Auberon Elstob
- 1936 George Archibald Hope
- 1950 Harold William Rogers
- 1981 David William Moir
- 1996 David Ashworth
- 2006 Patrick John Mark Angier

== See also ==
- Grade I listed buildings in Cheshire East
- Grade I listed churches in Cheshire
- Listed buildings in Prestbury, Cheshire
- Norman architecture in Cheshire

== Media ==
The Village People: Life Around St. Peter's Church, Prestbury, Cheshire. A Granada Television series, spring 2002
