= Listed buildings in Prestbury, Cheshire =

Prestbury is a civil parish in Cheshire East, England. It contains 51 buildings that are recorded in the National Heritage List for England as designated listed buildings. Of these, one is listed at Grade I, the highest grade, three are listed at Grade II*, the middle grade, and the others are at Grade II. Many of the listed buildings are in the village of Prestbury, including houses, a church and associated structures, shops, a bank, hotels, a public house, the village stocks, the entrance to a railway tunnel, and a telephone kiosk. In the surrounding countryside the listed buildings are more houses, farms and farm buildings, parish boundary stones, an ancient cross, and mileposts.

== Key ==
Grade	Criteria
I	Buildings of exceptional interest, sometimes considered to be internationally important
II*	Particularly important buildings of more than special interest
II	Buildings of national importance and special interest

== Buildings ==
Name and location	Photograph	Date	Notes	Grade
Cross; 53.31393°N 2.15060°W	—	11th century (probable)	The cross was moved to its present site in the 20th century. It is in gritstone, and consists of a barrel-shaped column with a broken top about 1.2 metres (3.9 ft) high. Near the top are two bands, and above these the column has four faces carved with part of a loop.	II
Prestbury Road Cross; 53.27288°N 2.15553°W		11th century (probable)	The cross was moved to its present position in c. 1935 when the road was widened. It is in sandstone, and stands about 1.3 metres (4.3 ft) high with a tapering circular shaft and a broken top. There is a raised band just above halfway, above which are four faces which may have traces of carving. It is also a scheduled monument.	II
Chapel, St Peter's Churchyard; 53.28898°N 2.15020°W		c. 1120	The chapel was almost completely rebuilt in 1747, leaving only the west portal as original. The chapel consists of a nave and a chancel. The portal is in Norman style, and consists of a round-headed archway flanked by pairs of columns. In the tympanum is a figure of Christ, and above it is a row of seven figures. In the west gable is an elliptical window, along the sides are round-headed windows, and in the east front is a round window.	II
St Peter's Church; 53.28927°N 2.15058°W		12th century	The oldest part of the church is the tympanum in the chancel arch. Most of the building dates from the 13th century, the south aisle was added in the early 14th century, and the tower and porch date from about 1480. The church was restored between 1879 and 1885 by George Gilbert Scott and John Oldrid Scott. It is built in sandstone and has a Kerridge stone-slate roof. The church consists of a nave with aisles and a south porch, a chancel, and a west tower. On the ridge is a bellcote. The tower is embattled and has crocketed pinnacles.	I
Spittle House (west range); 53.29689°N 2.15682°W		14th century (possibly)	Originally part of a monastic leper hospital, and later incorporated into a house. It is timber-framed on a sandstone plinth, and has a Kerridge stone-slate roof. The building has a rectangular plan with a front of two bays. It contains three pairs of crucks.	II*
Willot Hall; 53.31933°N 2.16923°W	—	Late 15th century	Originating as a medieval hall house, it was encased in sandstone and extended in the 17th century. There was a restoration and further expansion in brick in 1933–39. The house has 2½ storeys and a four-bay entrance front, the left bay being wider than the others. This is gabled, and the other bays have timber-framed dormers. The windows are mullioned. Inside, the great hall has been re-opened to the roof.	II*
Dod's Marsh; 53.30654°N 2.15133°W	—	16th century	Originally a timber-framed farmhouse, with later alterations and additions. It is now in sandstone and brick, and has a Kerridge stone-slate roof. The house has a T-shaped plan, is in one and two storeys, and has a six-bay front. The left bay is a cross-wing, and the next three bays incorporate a stair turret. Some of the windows are mullioned. Inside, there are crucks and a timber-framed partition wall.	II
Priests House [former National Westminster Bank] 53.28947°N 2.15136°W		16th century	This originated as a vicarage, known as Priest's House, later a cottage, and then a bank. It is timber-framed on a stone plinth and has a Kerridge stone-slate roof. The building is in 2½ storeys, and has a near-symmetrical front of five bays. The second and fourth bays have full height projections, at the top of which are dormers with cross gables. In the middle bay is a balcony with flat shaped balusters at first floor level. The windows are casements.	II*
Normans Hall; 53.28302°N 2.16937°W	—	Mid to late 16th century	A farmhouse with later additions and alterations, including one of 1921 by Henry Boddington. It is partly timber-framed on a stone plinth, and partly in brick, with a Kerridge stone-slate roof. The house has an L-shaped plan, is in two storeys, and has a four-bay north front. It is in Tudor style, and contains mullioned and transomed windows.	II
Bridge End Farmhouse; 53.29064°N 2.14783°W	—	Late 16th century	Basically a timber-framed farmhouse, with two full crucks still present in the interior. The exterior is partly in sandstone, and partly in brick, and the farmhouse has a Kerridge stone-slate roof. It has a long rectangular plan, is in two storeys, and has a front of seven bays. The windows are a mix of sashes and casements.	II
Legh Arms Hotel; 53.28895°N 2.15170°W		Late 16th century	The hotel was extended to the left in the 18th century. There is some timber-framing, most of the hotel is in brick, and it has a Kerridge stone-slate roof. It is in two storeys, the original part having an H-shaped plan in four bays, the outer bays being gabled. The windows are casements, and there is a bow window in the extension.	II
Yew Tree Cottage; 53.27499°N 2.16544°W	—	1600	This was originally the cross-wing of a larger farmhouse. It is partly in rendered brick on a stone plinth, and partly in stone, and it has a Kerridge stone-slate roof. The house is in two storeys, and has a road front of a single bay. On this front are mullioned windows, and on the right side the windows are horizontally sliding sashes.	II
Plant House Farmhouse; 53.30087°N 2.15131°W	—	1609	The farmhouse was extended later in the 17th and 20th centuries. The whole house is in 1½ storeys and has a tiled roof. It has a four-bay east front, the left two bays being the 20th-century extension. The right two bays are timber-framed on a stone plinth, and contains casement windows, and a gabled dormer.	II
Bullshead Farmhouse; 53.32182°N 2.16683°W	—	Early 17th century	The farmhouse was altered in the 18th and 20th centuries. It is built partly in timber framing and partly in brick, all on a sandstone plinth. The house has a T-shaped plan, is in two storeys, and has a three-bay front, the right bay being a gabled cross wing. The windows are casements.	II
Bridge Hotel; 53.28976°N 2.15078°W		1626	Originally five cottages, later converted into a hotel, it is built partly in sandstone and partly in rendered brick, and has a Kerridge stone-slate roof. The hotel has an L-shaped plan, and is in two storeys. The street front has four bays, and contains casement windows, those in the upper storey in gabled half-dormers. In the south front are mullioned and transomed windows, and inside is a timber-framed partition with wattle and daub infill.	II
Horners; 53.28871°N 2.15199°W		17th century	A house with walls that are partly whitewashed and partly rendered. It is in 2½ storeys, and has a one-bay front with a gable. The windows are mullioned.	II
Sundial, St Peter's Churchyard; 53.28912°N 2.15076°W		1672	The sundial is in sandstone. It consists of a gadrooned baluster on three circular steps, and has an engraved octagonal copper plate with a pierced scrolled gnomon.	II
Butley Hall; 53.29199°N 2.14896°W	—	Late 17th century	A façade was added to the hall in 1777, it was expanded in the 19th century, and converted into flats in the 20th century. The house is built in sandstone and has a Kerridge stone-slate roof. The original main part is in three storeys and has a seven-bay front with a central pediment. Most of the windows are sashes, some of them horizontally sliding, and other are mullioned; there is also a Venetian window.	II
Flats 1, 2 and 3, Prestbury Golf Club; 53.28001°N 2.15852°W	—	Late 17th century	Originally a farmhouse, it was extended in the 18th and the 20th centuries, and has been converted into flats. It is built in brick on a stone plinth, and has a Kerridge stone-slate roof. The building has a long rectangular plan, is in two storeys, and has a seven-bay east front. It contains mullioned windows and a canted bay window. Inside there are timber-framed partition walls.	II
Heybridge Farmhouse; 53.28826°N 2.13828°W	—	1682	The farmhouse was altered in 1771 and again in the 20th century. It is built in sandstone and has Kerridge stone-slate roof. The house has two storeys and a four-bay front. The left two bays are rendered and contain casement windows. The right two bays form a gabled cross-wing, and contain a mullioned window and a casement.	II
Brooks Cottages; 53.29086°N 2.14952°W		1686	A farmhouse, later converted into two cottages. It is built in sandstone and has a Kerridge stone-slate roof. The cottages are in two storeys and each cottage has a two-bay front. The windows are mullioned, those in the upper floor being in half-dormers with bargeboards.	II
Manor House; 53.28984°N 2.15127°W		1708	Originally a vicarage, it was extended and altered in the 19th century. The house is pebbledashed with a Kerridge stone-slate roof, it is in two storeys with a basement, and has a front of four bays. The windows are sashes, and there is a central pediment with a datestone.	II
Yew Tree House; 53.29772°N 2.13309°W	—	1711	A sandstone house with a Kerridge stone-slate roof, it is in 1½ storeys, and has a symmetrical three-bay south front. Above the central doorway the lintel is inscribed with the date. The windows in the lower floor are 20th-century casements, and the upper floor contains mullioned windows in gabled half-dormers.	II
Office, [and former] bank and library 53.28857°N 2.15224°W		1721	This originated as a school, with the master's house added in 1751, and the building has since been converted into other uses. It is in brick with a Kerridge stone-slate roof. The building has a T-shaped plan, it is in two storeys, and has a five-bay front. The left three bays contain mullioned windows, the fourth bay projects on wooden piers, and the right bay contains 20th-century windows and an inscribed plaque. There is another plaque in the left gable.	II
Spittle House (north range); 53.29709°N 2.15673°W	—	Early 18th century	The former farmhouse is in brick with a Kerridge stone-slate roof. It has a double pile plan, is in two storeys, and has a symmetrical three-bay front. The windows are casements.	II
Barns and cottage, Willot Hall; 53.31940°N 2.16863°W	—	Early 18th century	The barns and cottage form an L-shaped plan, are built in brick, partly on a stone plinth, and have Kerridge stone-slate roofs. The barns contain a cart entrance and ventilation holes, and the cottage has casement windows. At the south end of the east range is a gable with ball finials.	II
Lychgate and churchyard wall, St Peter's Church; 53.28945°N 2.15113°W		1728 (re-erected)	The west churchyard wall was added to the lychgate in 1765. They are built in sandstone, and the lychgate has a roof of Kerridge stone-slate. The lychgate has solid side walls with pilasters at the ends. On its top are crocketed pinnacles, and inside are two inscribed plaques. The wall has a round coping, and there are two further gateways, both approached by sweeping flights of steps.	II
Walnut Tree Farmhouse; 53.27741°N 2.15537°W	—	1742	The farmhouse is in brick on a stone plinth and has a Welsh slate roof. It has a double pile plan, is in two storeys, and has a symmetrical three-bay front. In the centre is a simple Doric porch. The windows are sashes, and on the front is a datestone.	II
Greenbank Farmhouse; 53.28334°N 2.17226°W	—	Mid 18th century	A brick farmhouse with a tiled roof. It has a double pile plan, is in two storeys, and has a symmetrical three-bay front. The windows are sashes, and there are pairs of circular windows in the gable ends.	II
Box Tree House [formerly New Road Cottage] 53.29073°N 2.14848°W		Mid 18th century	A brick house with a Kerridge stone-slate roof, it is in two storeys, and has a symmetrical three-bay front. The windows are sashes, and the central doorway has a triangular pediment.	II
Admiral Rodney Inn; 53.29056°N 2.14934°W		18th century	A public house, the interior of which was remodelled in about 1939, leaving the exterior largely unchanged. It is built in brick with a Kerridge stone-slate roof, and is mainly in two storeys. The original part of the building is in three bays, and to the right is a single-storey extension. To the left a two-storey cottage has been incorporated. The windows are casements.	II
Pear Tree Cottage; 53.28816°N 2.15144°W		1770	The house was extended to the left in the 20th century. It is built in rendered brick with a Kerridge stone-slate roof, and is in two storeys. The original part contains casement windows, and has a plaque inscribed with the date and initials. The entrance is in the extension.	II
Fallibroome Farmhouse; 53.27559°N 2.16314°W	—	Late 18th century	The farmhouse is in brick with a Welsh slate roof. It has a double pile plan, is in two storeys with an attic, and has a symmetrical three-bay front. The doorway has an architrave, a triangular pediment and a fanlight. The windows are casements, those in the lower two storeys being mullioned and transomed.	II
Post Office and Spindles [now Henry's Café and Gascoigne Halman estate agent] 53.28893°N 2.15138°W		Late 18th century	Two shops with accommodation above, altered in the 20th century. They are built in brick and have a Kerridge stone-slate roof. The shops are in two storeys with attics, and the whole building has a three-bay front. In the ground floor are shop windows, and above are sashes, those in the lower two storeys having keystones.	II
White House Café [now The Coast] 53.28878°N 2.15148°W		Late 18th century	Originally a farmhouse, later used as a restaurant. It is in brick on a stone plinth, and has a Kerridge stone-slate roof. The building is in two storeys with a symmetrical three-bay front. The windows are mullioned and transomed. Above the central bay is a triangular pediment with dentillations.	II
Parish boundary stone 53.27227°N 2.16863°W	—	1789	The boundary stone is in sandstone and consists of a rectangular block with a shaped top. It is inscribed with the letters "F" (for Fallibroome) and "M" (for Macclesfield).	II
Prestbury Hall; 53.28828°N 2.15215°W		c. 1790	A large house with possibly 16th-century origins, it was refaced in about 1640 and restored in about 1950. It is in stuccoed brick on a sandstone plinth with hipped Kerridge stone-slate roofs. The house has three storeys and a symmetrical five-bay front, and the windows are sashes. The outer bays project forward; above the windows are decorated panels, those over the top windows being fan lunettes. There is a central porch with an architrave and a round-headed doorway.	II
Lilac Cottage; 53.29053°N 2.14940°W		Late 18th to early 19th century	Originally a cottage, it was altered in the 20th century and used as a restaurant. It is in whitewashed brick with a Kerridge stone-slate roof. The building is in two storeys and has a three-bay front. In the centre is a door, flanked by bow windows, and in the upper floor are casement windows.	II
Tiffin Kitchen [formerly Steak and Kebab Restaurant] 53.29065°N 2.14907°W		Late 18th to early 19th century	At first a house, later a restaurant, it is built in brick and has a Kerridge stone-slate roof. The building is in two storeys, and has a three-bay front. The windows are casements, and there is a 20th-century single-storey extension linking the building to the adjacent public house.	II
Milepost; 53.29338°N 2.13457°W	—	c. 1820	The milepost was erected when it was a turnpike road. It is in sandstone with a triangular top, and it carries a cast iron plate inscribed with the distances in miles to London, Macclesfield and Stockport.	II
1, 2, 3 and 4 The Village (east side); 53.28849°N 2.15166°W		Early 19th century	Originally four weavers' cottages, with one cottage added to the right, they are in brick with a Kerridge stone-slate roof. Now houses, they form a curved rectangular block, the original four cottages being in three storeys, and the later cottage in two. The windows are sashes.	II
1–5 The Village and Swanwick House (west side); 53.28933°N 2.15146°W		Early 19th century	Shops and accommodation that were extended with the addition of dormers in the 20th century. They are in brick with a Kerridge stone-slate roof, they have three storeys and a six-bay front. Most of the windows are sashes. The left two bays contain shops with bow windows, and the third bay has a doorway with consoles, a flat hood and a semicircular fanlight. In the fourth and fifth bays is a two-storey canted bay window, and the sixth bay contains a doorway.	II
Bonis Hall; 53.30744°N 2.14687°W	—	Early 19th century	A house, later used as offices. It is built in pebbledashed brick and has a Kerridge stone-slate roof. The building is in two storeys, with a symmetrical seven-bay south front. The outer bays project forward and have gables with urn and ball finials. The central doorway has a triangular pediment, and the windows are sashes. Behind the front is a square tower with a pyramidal roof, a bellcote, a copper cupola, and a weathervane.	II
Church House and Ravenstone; 53.28955°N 2.15131°W		Early 19th century	A pair of brick houses on a stone plinth with a Kerridge stone-slate roof. They are in two storeys with attics, and have a five-bay front. The windows are sashes, and the doorways have triangular pediments. Two of the windows in the top floor have iron balconies.	II
The Red House and Bollin Café [now Bacchus Restaurant] 53.28912°N 2.15165°W		Early 19th century	Originally two houses, later a house on the left and a café on the right. They are in brick with a Kerridge stone-slate roof. The building is in 2½ storeys, and has a six-bay front. The house has a central doorway with a reeded architrave and a pediment, and in the café is a modern entrance front. The windows are sashes, those in the upper floor being paired in half-dormers.	II
Stocks; 53.28921°N 2.15133°W		Early 19th century	The stocks were placed in their present position in 1938. They consist of two rectangular piers with shaped tops, between which are a split wooden plank with four holes and a steel bar.	II
Unicorn House; 53.28895°N 2.15136°W		Early 19th century	Originating as a public house, later converted into a shop with accommodation above, it was altered in the 20th century. It is built in brick, and has a Kerridge stone-slate roof. The building is in 2½ storeys, and has a front of two bays. In the ground floor are two bow windows, the other windows being casements.	II
South entrance arch, Prestbury Railway Tunnel; 53.29427°N 2.14505°W		1845	The tunnel was designed by George W. Buck for the Manchester and Birmingham Railway. The arch is built in sandstone, it is horseshoe-shaped, and has a moulded rusticated surround. Above it is a modillion cornice and a solid parapet.	II
Parish boundary stone 53.27093°N 2.16428°W	—	1849	The boundary stone is in sandstone, it is triangular in section, and has a domed top. The stone is inscribed with the letters "F" (for Fallibroome) and "M" (for Macclesfield).	II
Hearse House, St Peter's Churchyard; 53.28894°N 2.15083°W		1852	The hearse house is built in brick with a Kerridge stone-slate roof. It has a rectangular plan, it is in a single storey, and has a two-bay east front. In the right bay is an archway with doors. There are plaques in the left bay and at the right end.	II
The Vicarage; 53.29004°N 2.15321°W		1893	A house designed by Ernest Newton in Arts and Crafts style. It is built in brick, with some tile-hanging and timber-framing, and has a hipped tiled roof. The house has an L-shaped plan, and a service wing. It is in two storeys with an attic, the service wing is in a single storey, and the house has a three-bay front. On the front is a timber-framed gable, and on the left side is a canted bay window.	II
Telephone kiosk 53.28918°N 2.15133°W		1935	A K6 type telephone kiosk, designed by Giles Gilbert Scott. Constructed in cast iron with a square plan and a dome, it has three unperforated crowns in the top panels.	II

== See also ==
- Listed buildings in Adlington
- Listed buildings in Bollington
- Listed buildings in Macclesfield
- Listed buildings in Over Alderley
- Listed buildings in Mottram St Andrew
- Listed buildings in Hazel Grove and Bramhall
