= Listed buildings in Mottram St Andrew =

Mottram St Andrew is a civil parish in Cheshire East, England. It contains 25 buildings that are recorded in the National Heritage List for England as designated listed buildings. Of these, three are listed at Grade II*, the middle grade, and the others are at Grade II. Apart from the village of Mottram St Andrew, the parish is rural. The listed buildings in the parish consists of country houses, one converted into a hotel, farmhouses, farm buildings, other houses and cottages, and a medieval cross.

== Key ==
Grade	Criteria
II*	Particularly important buildings of more than special interest
II	Buildings of national importance and special interest

== Buildings ==
Name and location	Photograph	Date	Notes	Grade
Mottram Cross; 53.30364°N 2.18156°W		Medieval	The village cross is in sandstone, with a medieval base, and the upper parts are dated 1832. The base consists of two square steps on which stands a square block. The shaft is octagonal and tapering, and carries a square head with a cross carved on the front.	II
Mottram Old Hall; 53.30890°N 2.17629°W	—	15th century	The original building was in stone with a moat. The upper floors were late rebuilt in timber framing, and in the 17th century the house was enlarged to give it an E-plan. It now consists of three ranges round a courtyard. The roofs are in Kerridge stone-slate. The house has a north front in three storeys.	II*
Lowerhouse Farmhouse; 53.30417°N 2.20106°W		Mid-16th century	The façade of the farmhouse dates from the early 17th century. The farmhouse is partly timber-framed, but mainly in brick, some of it encasing earlier timer-framing. It stands on a stone plinth and has a roof of Kerridge stone-slate. The house has an H-shaped plan, is in two storeys, and has a three-bay front, the outer bays projecting forward, and gabled. Most of the timber-framing is in the right bay, which contains casement windows; the windows in the other bays are mullioned. Inside the house is a large inglenook, and there are fragments of wall painting.	II*
Legh Hall Cottage; 53.30074°N 2.17387°W		Late 16th century	Originally Legh Old Hall, the building was probably at first timber-framed. It is now mainly in sandstone with a Kerridge stone-slate roof. The house has an H-shaped plan, is in two storeys, and has a four-bay front, the outer bays projecting forward, and gabled. Some of the windows are mullioned, and there is a 17th-century dormer. At the rear of the outer bays is some exposed timber-framing with brick nogging.	II
Mottram Hall Farmhouse; 53.30896°N 2.17719°W		Late 16th century	This originated as a barn for Mottram Old Hall, and was later converted into a house. It is timber-framed with brick nogging on a sandstone plinth, and has a roof of Kerridge stone-slate. The house has a rectangular plan, is in two storeys, and has a five-bay front. The windows are 20th-century casements.	II
Farmers Green; 53.29356°N 2.16826°W	—	1581	Originally a farmhouse with an H-shaped plan, it was remodelled in the late 19th and in the 20th centuries. The older part consists of a massive gabled stone chimney stack which is inscribed with the date and details of construction. A window has been cut through the stone stack. The later part of the house contains casement windows, a timber-framed gable, and bay windows. Inside the house are timber-framed partition walls.	II
Higher Farmhouse; 53.30504°N 2.18970°W	—	Late 16th to early 17th century	Originating as a timber-framed farmhouse, it has been partly refaced in brick. It stands on a stone plinth and has a composition tile roof. The house has an H-shaped plan, is in two storeys, and has a five-bay front, the outer bays being gabled. The windows are lattice-glazed casements. Inside the house are timber-framed partition walls.	II
Keeper's Close; 53.30501°N 2.17882°W		Early 17th century	This was first a farmhouse, then a gamekeeper's cottage, then a house. It is built in brick on a sandstone plinth, and has a roof of Kerridge stone-slate. The house has a rectangular plan, is in two storeys, and has a four-bay front, the outer bays being gabled. The windows are mullioned with casements.	II
Woodside Farmhouse; 53.30556°N 2.17359°W		Early 17th century	Alterations and additions were made to the farmhouse in the 18th century. It is mainly timber-framed with brick nogging on a sandstone plinth, and has a west front in brick. The roof is in Welsh slate, and the house has a T-shaped plan. All the windows are 20th-century casements.	II
Hunter's Pool Cottage; 53.30007°N 2.17917°W		17th century	Originally a farmhouse, and later a house, the cottage is timber-framed with brick nogging and a thatched roof. It is in a single storey with an attic, and has a three-bay front. The windows are casements. To the right are brick extension with Kerridge stone-slate roofs.	II
Hunter's Pool Farmhouse; 53.29527°N 2.18080°W		17th century	The original farmhouse was timber-framed, and a large brick extension was added in 1722. In the late 19th century the original part was rebuilt in brick. The house stands on a sandstone plinth, and has a roof of Kerridge stone-slate. It has an L-shaped plan with a five-bay front. The left three bays are in two storeys, and result from the original building; the right two bays are from the addition, they are in three storeys, and are gabled. The windows are mullioned and transomed, and contain casements.	II
St Andrew's Cottage; 53.30906°N 2.18502°W	—	17th century	This originated as a farmhouse, and has later been used as a house; it was extended in the 20th century. The house is timber-framed with a plaster infill, on a rendered stone plinth, and has a Kerridge stone-slate roof with a stone ridge. Originally rectangular, it now has an L-shaped plan. The windows are casements, those in the upper floor being in gabled half-dormers.	II
Newton Hall Farmhouse; 53.32282°N 2.18172°W		Late 17th century	The farmhouse is built in sandstone with a Kerridge stone-slate roof. It is in two storeys, and has a three-bay north front. The windows are mullioned, those in the upper storey in gabled half-dormers. There is a central lean-to porch, and external steps lead down to a cellar.	II
Newton Hall Farm Cottage; 53.32282°N 2.18173°W		Late 17th century	This originated as a wing of Newton Hall Farmhouse, and was later converted into a cottage; it was extended in the late 18th century, and partly rebuilt in the 19th century, and again in 1919. It is partly timber-framed and clad in sandstone, and partly in brick, and has a Welsh slate roof. The cottage is in two storeys, and has a two-bay front. All the windows date from the 20th century.	II
Woodend Farmhouse; 53.29833°N 2.16452°W		1714	The farmhouse is built in brick with a Welsh slate roof. It is in two storeys, and has a symmetrical three-bay front. Above the central doorway is a datestone. There is a small 20th-century extension to the left.	II
Farm buildings, Woodend Farm; 53.29859°N 2.16431°W		c. 1715	The farm buildings consists of a shippon and a hay loft. They are in brick with a Kerridge stone-slate roof and a stone ridge. They have a rectangular plan, and are in two storeys. They contain doorways and square pitch holes.	II
Mill Lane Farm; 53.31844°N 2.17872°W	—	Early 18th century	A brick farmhouse on a sandstone plinth with Kerridge stone-slate roofs. It is in 2½ storeys, and has a symmetrical five-bay front. Two steps lead up to a doorway with an architrave and a fanlight. The windows on the front of the house are sashes, and on the right side is a mullioned and transomed window containing casements.	II
Cherry Tree; 53.30903°N 2.18244°W	—	1742	This was originally a lodge, later converted into a café, and then into a house. It is built in brick on a stone plinth, and has a roof of Kerridge stone-slate with a stone ridge. The house is in two storeys, and has a three-bay front. The windows are casements, and on the front of the house is a datestone.	II
Mottram Hall Hotel; 53.31147°N 2.17337°W		c. 1750	Originally a country house, later extended, and in the 1970s converted into a hotel. It is built in brick with sandstone dressings and Kerridge stone-slate roofs. The building is in two storeys, and has a 17-bay front with end pavilions. The original house consisted of the central five bays; this has giant Doric pilasters, a triglyph frieze, and a triangular pediment with a Rococo cartouche.	II*
Walls, railings, gates and gate piers, Mottram Hall Hotel; 53.30883°N 2.18229°W	—	c. 1750	The gate piers and curving wing walls are in sandstone, and the gates and railings are in wrought iron. There are two pairs of piers, the larger pair carrying the main gates. Outside these are smaller piers, with pedestrian gates between. The gate piers are rusticated on moulded plinths, and have capstones with ball finials.	II
Higher House Farmhouse; 53.30649°N 2.19116°W	—	Mid-18th century	The farmhouse is in brick with sandstone dressings standing on a stone plinth, and has a Kerridge stone-slate roof with a stone ridge. It is in two storeys and has a symmetrical three-bay front. The central doorway is approached by three steps and has a Roman Doric doorcase with a semicircular fanlight. The windows are sashes. At the rear is a parallel range, probably added later, with a two-storey canted bay window.	II
Legh Hall; 53.30087°N 2.17438°W		Mid-18th century	A country house to which additions and alterations were made in the 19th and 20th centuries. It is built in brick, and has a Welsh slate roof. The house is in 2½ storeys, and has a symmetrical five-bay front. The central bay projects slightly forward, and contains a doorway with an architrave. The windows are sashes, those in the attic in gabled half-dormers that break the modillioned cornice at the top of the house.	II
Greendale Farmhouse; 53.29453°N 2.16969°W		c. 1760	The farmhouse was altered in the 19th and 20th centuries. It is built in stuccoed brick and has a Kerridge stone-slate roof. The house has a double-pile plan, it is in two storeys, and has a symmetrical three-bay front. The central doorway has a Roman Doric doorcase with a triangular pediment and a semicircular fanlight. The windows are a mix of sashes and casements.	II
Pair of hay barns, Greendale Farm; 53.29458°N 2.17034°W	—	Late 18th century	Two brick hay barns containing earlier timbers. One has a roof of Kerridge stone-slate, the other of Welsh slate. They stand side by side, and are joined by a hood of timber and corrugated iron. The east end wall contains ventilation holes in a diamond pattern.	II
Turner House Farmhouse; 53.29524°N 2.18595°W		Late 18th century	A brick farmhouse on a rusticated stone plinth, with a Kerridge stone-slate roof and stone ridge. It is in two storeys, and has a symmetrical three-bay front. The outer bays contain three-light casement windows, each with a stone keystone, and in the centre is a 20th-century timber gabled porch.	II

== See also ==
- Listed buildings in Alderley Edge
- Listed buildings in Over Alderley
- Listed buildings in Prestbury
- Listed buildings in Stockport
- Listed buildings in Wilmslow
