= Butley Hall =

Grade II listed English country house in Prestbury, Cheshire East, Cheshire, England

Coordinates: 53.29212°N 2.14823°W

Butley Hall is a former large house, now converted into flats, in the village of Prestbury, Cheshire. It was rebuilt in 1777 for Peter Downes. The house was extended by an addition to the north in the 19th century, and converted into flats during the 20th century. It is constructed in sandstone rubble with ashlar dressings, it has Kerridge stone-slate roofs, and five brick chimneys. The main front of the house is in two storeys and seven bays. The central three bays protrude forwards and are surmounted by a triangular pediment. On each side of the front are wings with Venetian windows. To the rear of the house is the front of an earlier three-storeyed house dating from the 17th century. The house is recorded in the National Heritage List for England (NHLE) as a designated Grade II listed building.

== See also ==
- Listed buildings in Prestbury, Cheshire
