= Dave Boylen =

English footballer

Personal information
- Date of birth: 26 October 1947 (age 79)
- Place of birth: Prestbury, England
- Position: Midfielder

Senior career*
| Years | Team | Apps | (Gls) |
- Ryder Brow
| 1966–1978 | Grimsby Town | 384 | (34) |
- Skegness Town
- * Club domestic league appearances and goals

David Boylen (born 26 October 1947) is an English former professional footballer who played as a midfielder, who later became a politician.

== Career ==
=== Football ===
Born in Prestbury, Cheshire, Boylen was playing non-league football with Ryder Brow when he signed a professional contract with Grimsby Town. At Grimsby between 1966 and 1978, Boylen made 384 appearances in the Football League, scoring 34 goals in the process. Boylen was part of the 1971–72 team that won the Division Four title. He later played non-league football with Skegness Town.

=== Politics ===
Boylen served as a Liberal Democrat councillor for the Freshney ward of North East Lincolnshire Council from 2007 to 2011.

== Honours ==
Grimsby Town

- Fourth Division champions: 1971–72
