= Mottram Hall =

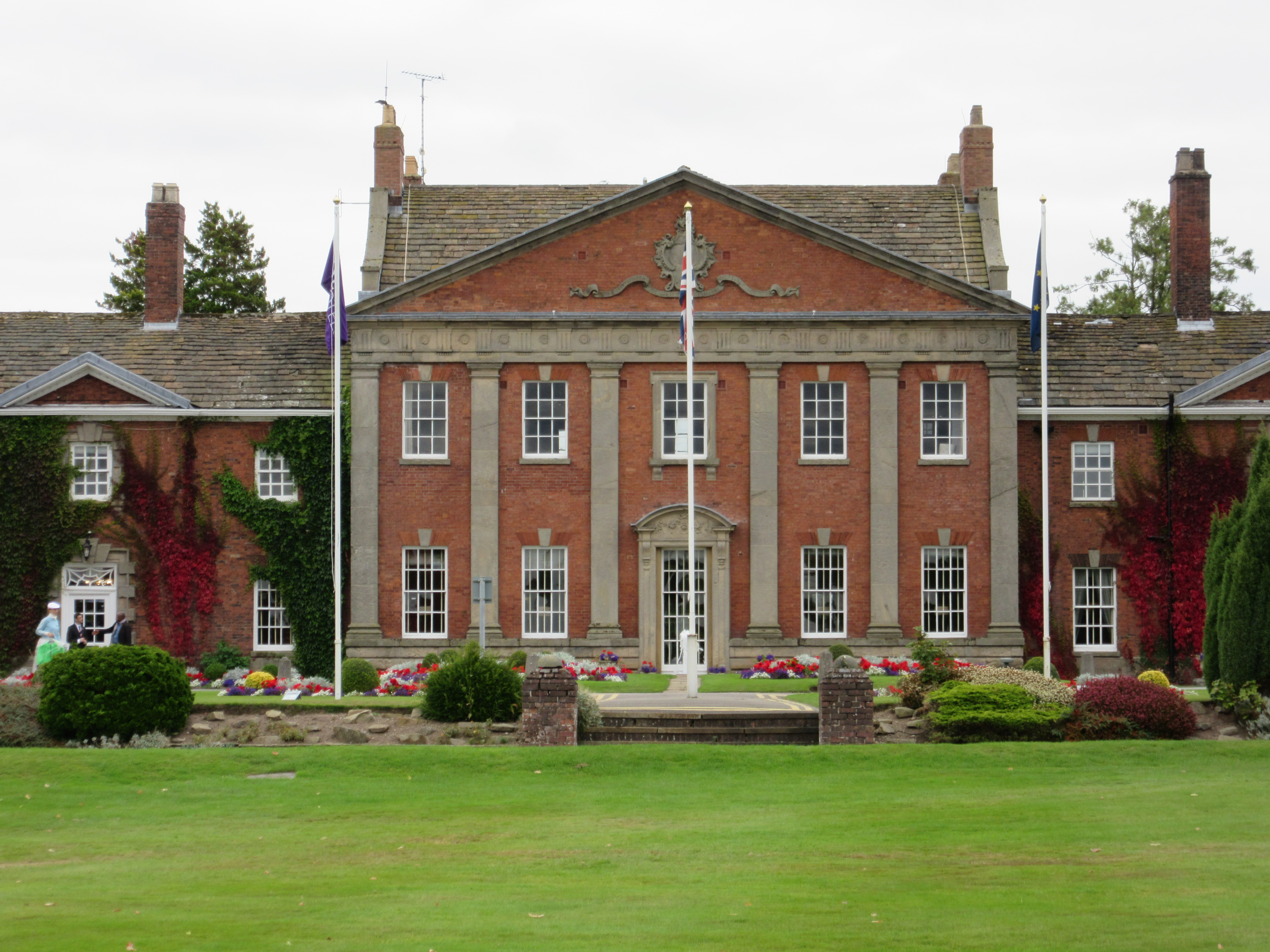

- Location in Cheshire
- 53.3115°N 2.1734°W
- Location: Mottram St. Andrew, Cheshire, England
- OS grid reference: SJ 885 794

History
- Built: c.1750; 276 years ago
- Built for: William Wright

Listed Building – Grade II*
- Official name: Mottram Hall Hotel
- Designated: 25 July 1952
- Reference no.: 1234766

Mottram Hall (also known as Mottram New Hall or the Mottram Hall Hotel) is a former country house to the northeast of the village of Mottram St. Andrew, Cheshire, England. It is recorded in the National Heritage List for England as a designated Grade II* listed building. It is not to be confused with Mottram Old Hall (alongside the access road 400m to the west).

The house was built around 1750 by William Wright for his son. It is constructed of Flemish bond orange brick with buff sandstone dressings, with a Kerridge stone slate roof, nine brick chimneys, and a facade with projecting end pavilions which have 20th-century extensions. From the mid-1970s the building has been used as a hotel, and from 2014 to 2018 as part of the QHotels group.

In 2012–13 the hotel underwent improvements and refurbishment at a cost of £5.5 million. This included a new restaurant, refurbishment of bedrooms, creation of conference suites, and restoration of the Garden Suite. In September 2018 the hotel was sold by the real estate investment company Aprirose to the hotel group Champneys (owned by Dorothy and Stephen Purdew).

== The Wright family ==
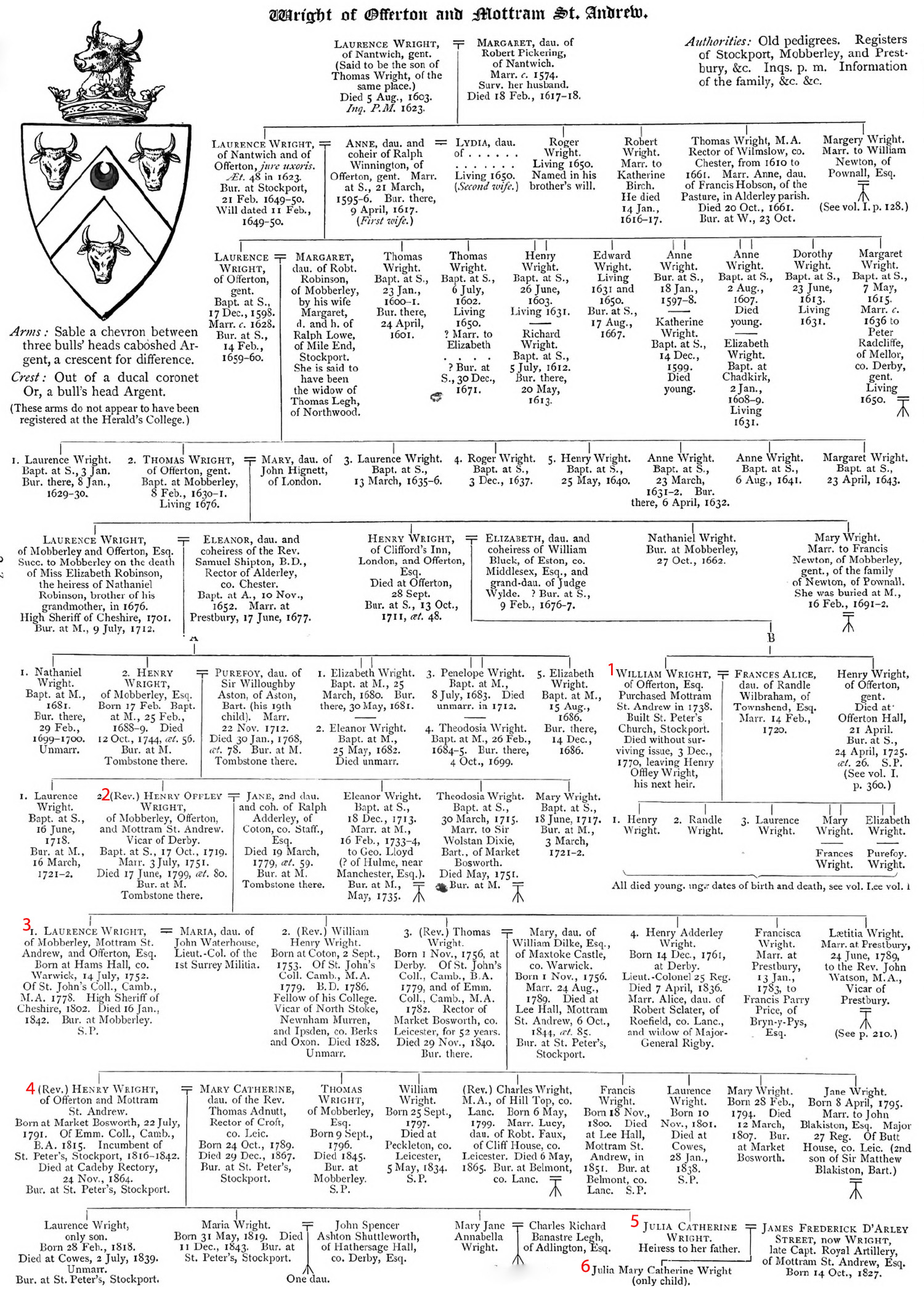
The family tree of the Wrights.

The family tree of the Wrights is shown at left. There were six generations of this family that owned the house and these are numbered from 1 to 6 in red starting with William Wright its originator.

William Wright built Mottram Hall in about 1750. He built the house for his son Randle but unfortunately his son died soon after its completion. William Wright was a wealthy landowner who was the proprietor of Offerton Hall near Stockport and also owned a townhouse in this village. He built St Peters Church in Stockport. He died in 1770 and as he had no heirs his estate was passed to the eldest son of his first cousin Rev Henry Offley Wright. It was then inherited by his son Laurence Wright and as he had no heirs it went to his nephew Rev Henry Wright. His daughter Julia Catherine who married James Frederick D’Arley Street then became the owner. When she died in 1916 her daughter Julia Mary who married twice inherited the house. It was she Julia Mary Wallis Wright who sold the house in 1922 and the advertisement is shown. It was bought by Walter Pownall who enjoyed gardening and often held open days to the public. He sold the house in 1939 (this advertisement is also shown). It then became a hotel.

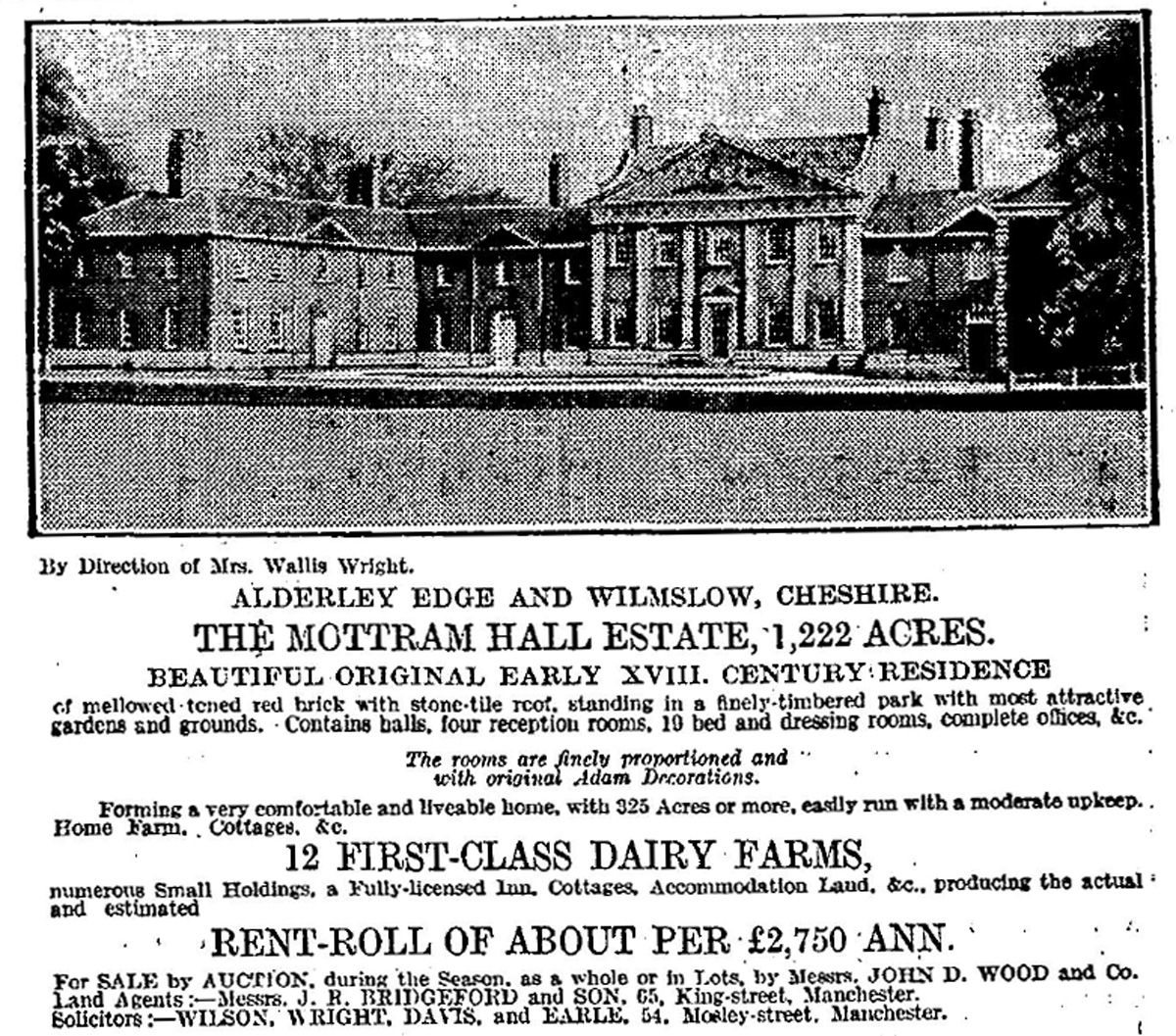
Mottram Hall sale advertisement in 1922

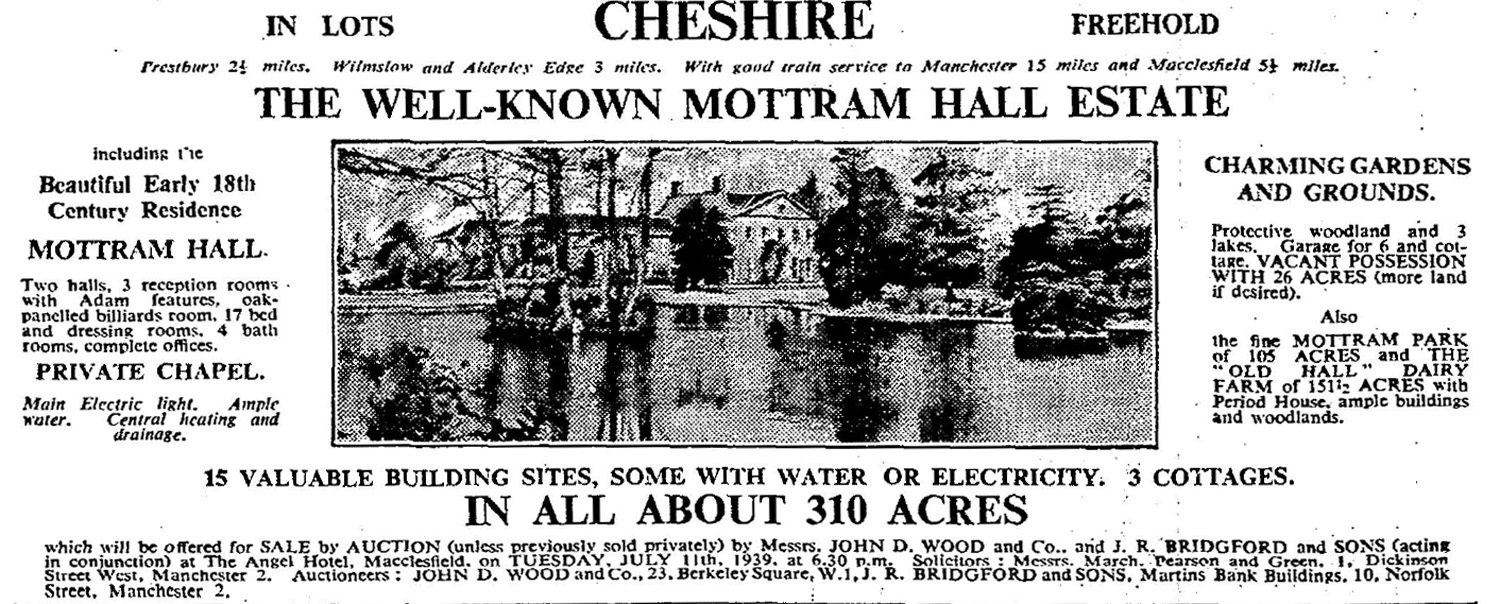
Mottram Hall sale advertisement in 1939

== See also ==
- Grade II* listed buildings in Cheshire East
- Listed buildings in Mottram St Andrew
