= Mottershead =

Mottershead is an English habitation name which has its common root in the township of Mottram St. Andrew in Cheshire, England where it was first recorded in the 13th century as Mottresheved, from the genitive case of the Old English byname Mōtere 'Speaker' and Middle English heved head (land), hill. The motto of the family is the Latin "Pro Amore Patriae" ("For the love of the homelands")

There are references to the place name "Mottresheved" in the Domesday Book. The name also may denote a building where village assemblies were held.

Notable people with the surname include:

- George Mottershead (1894–1978), English founder of Chester Zoo
- Joseph Mottershead (1688–1771), English dissenting minister
- Thomas G. Mottershead (1826–1884), trade unionist
- Thomas Mottershead (1892–1917), recipient of the Victoria Cross

== Other ==
- Mottram St. Andrew
