= Prestbury, Cheshire =

Village and civil parish in Cheshire, England

Coordinates: 53.293°N 2.145°W

Prestbury
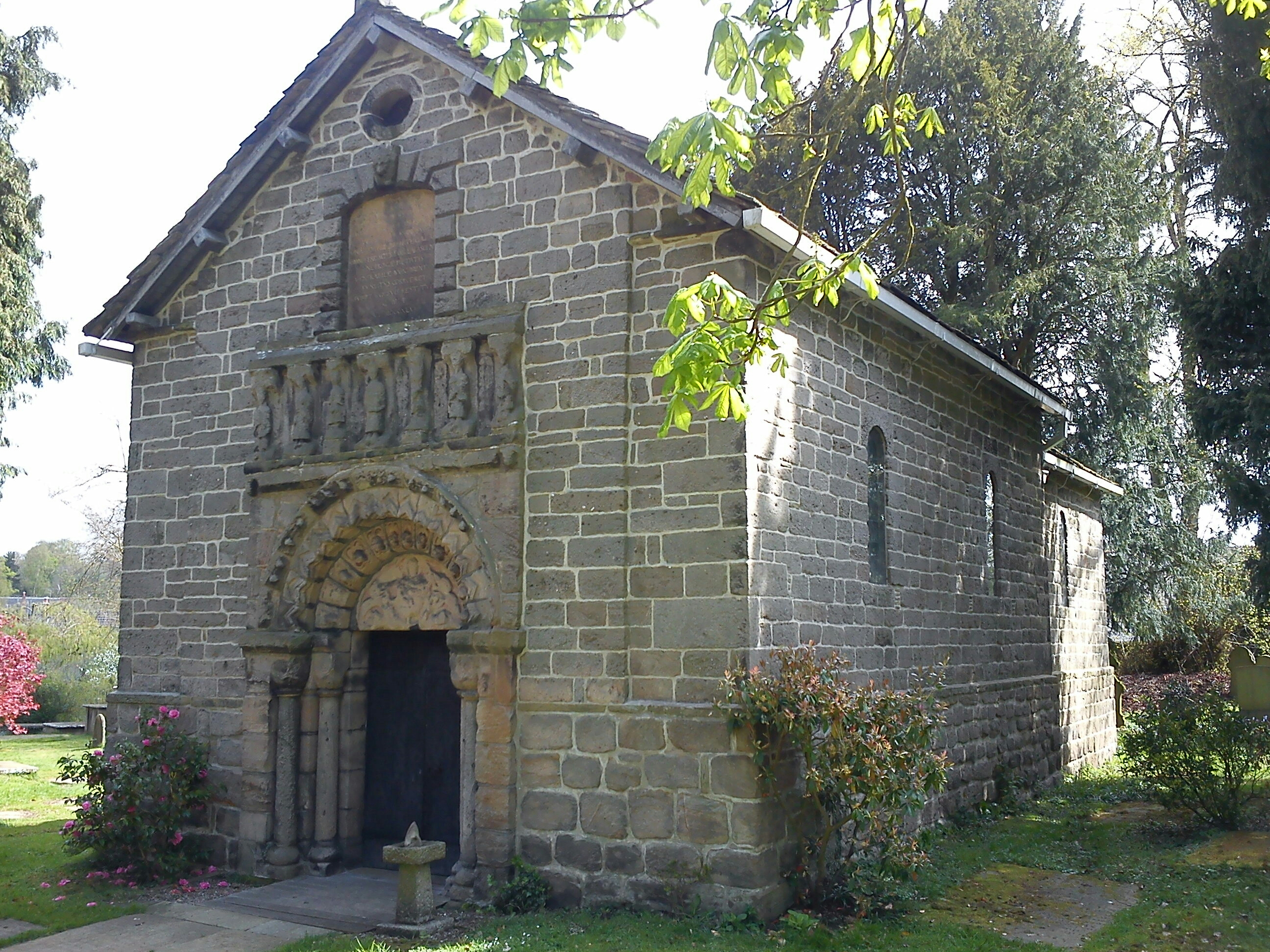
- Norman Chapel, Prestbury

- Location within Cheshire
- Population: 3,471 (2011 census)
- OS grid reference: SJ904773
- Civil parish: Prestbury
- Unitary authority: Cheshire East
- Ceremonial county: Cheshire
- Region: North West
- Country: England
- Sovereign state: United Kingdom
- Post town: MACCLESFIELD
- Postcode district: SK10
- Dialling code: 01625
- Police: Cheshire
- Fire: Cheshire
- Ambulance: North West
- UK Parliament: Macclesfield

Prestbury is a village and civil parish in Cheshire, England; it lies about 2 miles (3 km) north of Macclesfield. At the 2001 census, it had a population of 3,324; it increased slightly to 3,471 at the 2011 census. The ecclesiastical parish is almost the same as the former Prestbury local government ward which consisted of the civil parishes of Prestbury, Adlington and Mottram St Andrew.

== Toponymy ==
As Prestbury was initially settled by priests, its name derives from Preôsta burh; it is sometimes thought to mean "priests' town", but more correctly means a priest's fortified enclosure.

== History and geography ==
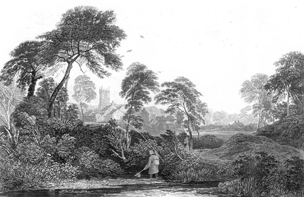
Prestbury from the River Bollin, 1819

Prestbury lies between Macclesfield and Wilmslow, for the most part on elevated ground above the flood-prone River Bollin. The ancient Forest of Macclesfield is to the east.

There is no evidence of a settlement before Saxon times, although a cemetery nearby which had been excavated in 1808 contained pottery cremation urns and signs of sacrifice and was presumably pre-Christian.

As a result of being initially settled by priests, they chose an enclosure with a defensible location on the River Bollin where there was relatively high ground close to the river on both sides so that crossing was easy. From there, they could travel to all parts of a parish which was extensive, though thinly populated, in part because the countryside was wild and barren and in part because the forest was reserved for hunting.

== The parish ==
At the time of the Norman Conquest, the parish consisted of thirty-five townships:

- Adlington
- Alderley
- Birtles
- Bollington
- Bosley
- Butley
- Capesthorne
- Chelford
- Fallibroome
- Gawsworth
- Henbury
- Hurdsfield
- Kettleshulme
- Lower Withington
- Lyme Handley
- Macclesfield
- Macclesfield Forest
- Marton
- Mottram St.Andrew
- Newton
- North Rode
- Old Withington
- Pott Shrigley
- Poynton
- Prestbury
- Rainow
- Siddington
- Sutton
- Taxal
- Tytherington
- Upton
- Wildboarclough
- Wincle
- Woodford
- Worth

Prestbury township was not mentioned in the Domesday Book, perhaps because information was not supplied or because Prestbury was only a church, not a manor.

Twelve of the other townships are mentioned. Butley was valued at two shillings at the time of the Domesday Survey, compared with 30 shillings at the time of Edward the Confessor, Adlington and Macclesfield were both worth 20 shillings and Siddington five shillings. The other eight townships were valued "Waste".

The church administered the civil as well as ecclesiastical affairs of the parish until the Local Government Act 1894 created rural districts and civil parishes. Three of the townships, Butley, Fallibroome and Prestbury, constitute the present civil parish of Prestbury.

== Village ==
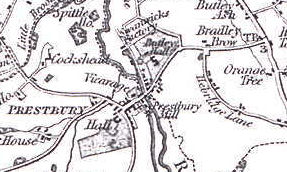
Prestbury in 1831

The school, smithies, the mill, inns and the stocks centre on a village street called The Village, which is broad enough for cattle fairs. Until the 19th century, the village street was connected to Pearl Street, the main street of Butley, by a ford.

In about 1825, a bridge of two arches was built, linking the village street to New Road, passing behind the cottages and the Admiral Rodney pub on the southeast side of Pearl Street. In 1855 the bridge was replaced by the present bridge with one arch.

During the 19th century, Prestbury became an important centre of the silk industry. The parish accounted for around a third of the total number of males employed in that branch of textile manufacturing in England and Wales in the early 19th century. Swanwick's factory operated and cottages were built for the workers ("Factory Cottages" or "Irish Row"). Weavers' cottages were built on both New Road and the village, with upper storeys for weaving.

In the 20th century, improved communications made it possible for Prestbury to develop into a residential community.

Prestbury Mill was destroyed by fire in 1940.

=== Conservation Area ===
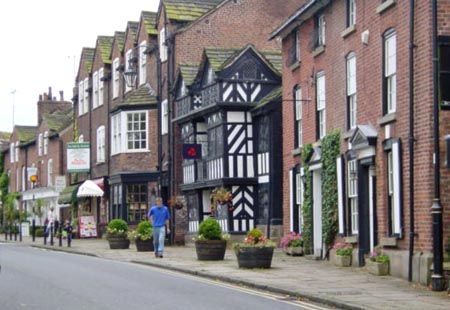
The north-west side of the village

The conservation area includes areas neighbouring the village street, the east side of Macclesfield Road as far south as the Methodist church, and New Road as far north as Butley Cottage and its garden.

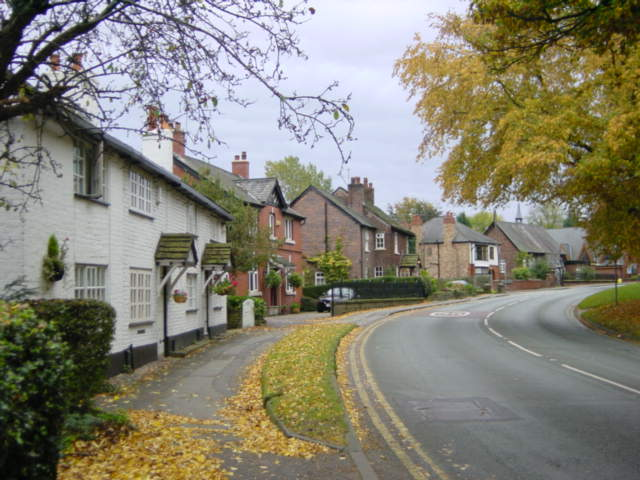
Macclesfield Road, looking south

Four buildings and structures in the conservation area are listed by English Heritage: The Bridge Hotel, Priest's House, Horner's and Prestbury Hall being regarded as "Focal Buildings". Other buildings are considered to be of townscape merit. Trees and even some hedges are important landscape features.

The Manor House was shown as the vicarage on the 1831 map.

Brooks Cottages, marked with a plaque reading "Rodger Brooks and Ellen his wife erected this house in the 24 years of his life Ano Dom 1686", are among the listed buildings on the Butley side of the Bollin.

=== Other areas ===
Smithy Cottage, built on the site of a former smithy, is just outside the conservation area.

Butley Hall is shown on the 1831 map but is outside the conservation area, as are the Butley Ash Inn and Spittle House, which was probably built between 1300 and 1450 as a leper hospital.

New estates were built during the 20th century to accommodate commuters.

The defining characteristic of 21st-century development has been the replacement of quite sizeable houses by large mansions, such as that built for former footballer Wayne Rooney.

Adlington Hall with strong connections with Prestbury is nearby.

=== Suburban development ===
Since the 1970s, there have been many new-build developments in the village. Packsaddle Park is a good example of this; it is a suburban development built on the grounds of Packsaddle House. There have also been many redevelopments of existing houses in the village.

== Governance ==
Prestbury is situated in Cheshire East, a unitary authority area with borough status in the ceremonial county of Cheshire. Prestbury falls within the UK parliament constituency of Macclesfield, represented in the House of Commons of the UK Parliament since 2024 by Tim Roca, a member of the Labour Party. Locally, Prestbury is governed by the Prestbury Parish Council which has 10 Councillors and meets once per month.

== Churches ==
St Peter's Church is a Grade I listed building and houses a Saxon cross within a Norman Chapel in its churchyard. The parish's memorial to the dead of the two World Wars is in the west porch.

St John's, Adlington, is a daughter church of St Peter's,

A new Methodist Church was built in 2001.

Prestbury falls within the Catholic parish of St Gregory's, Bollington.

== Education ==
Prestbury Church of England Primary School.

== Sporting facilities ==
- Badminton club
- Bowling club
- Cricket club
- Football clubs
- Prestbury Golf Club, a parkland golf course established in 1920, designed by Harry Colt and currently ranked 70th in the country
- Macclesfield Rugby Club
- Livery yard with indoor arena for hire
- Squash rackets club
- Tennis club.

== Transport ==
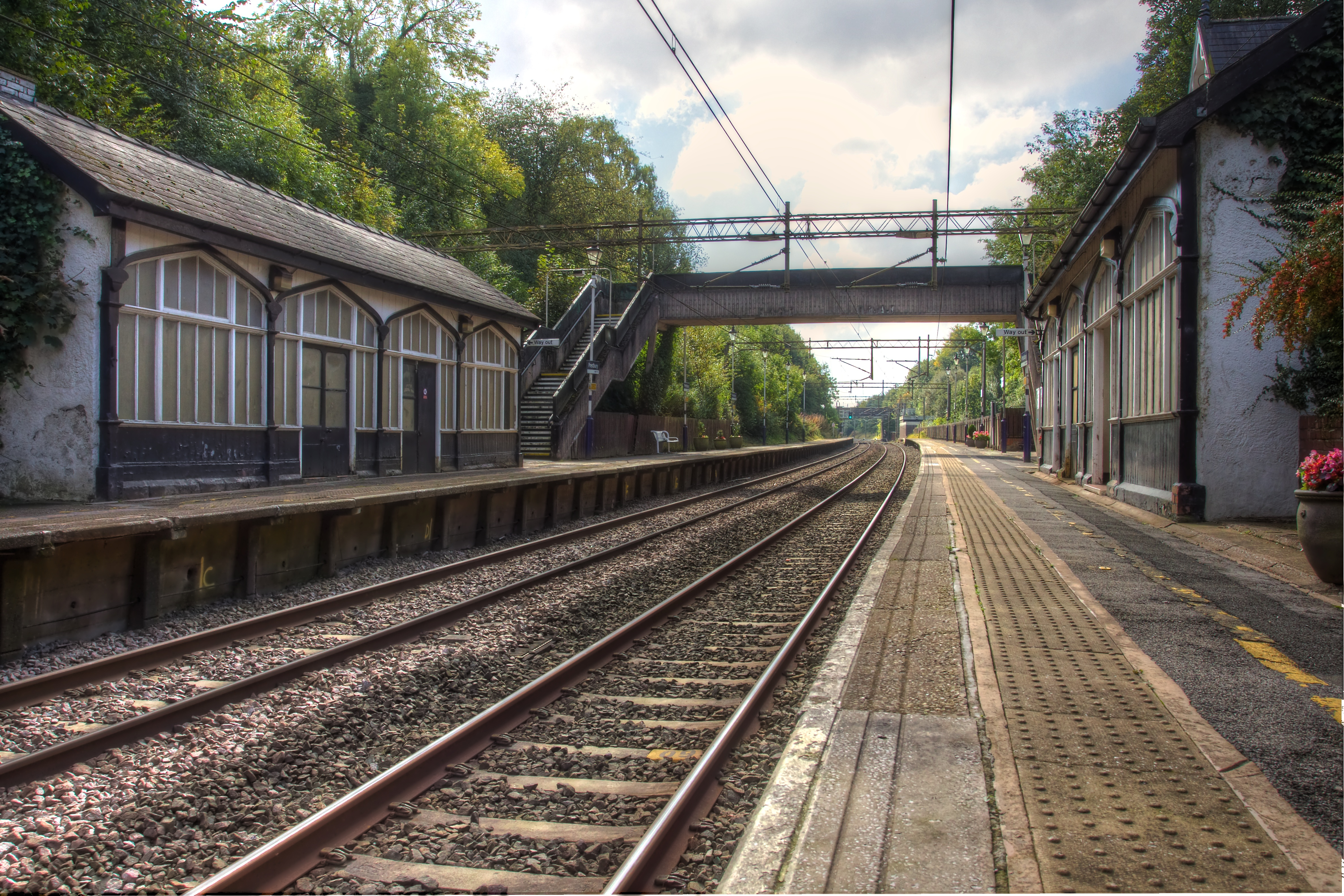
Prestbury station

Prestbury railway station is located a few minutes walk from the village centre. It is served by Northern Trains services between Manchester Piccadilly, Macclesfield and Stoke-on-Trent. It was opened on 24 November 1845 and was refurbished in 1986. The south entrance arch to Prestbury Railway Tunnel is grade II listed.

The village is a natural traffic hub because of the lay of the land. The road from Macclesfield to Altrincham (A538) carries traffic between Macclesfield and Wilmslow through the centre of the village. The Macclesfield to Hazel Grove road (A523), built in 1810, goes through the parish in a north–south direction, passing to the east of the village.

D&G Bus operate services between Prestbury and Macclesfield.

== Notable people ==
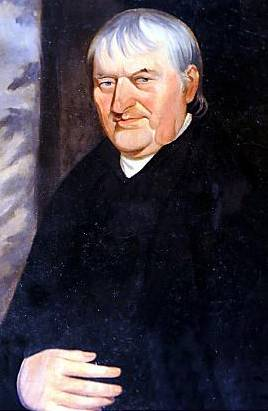
portrait of Thomas Henshaw

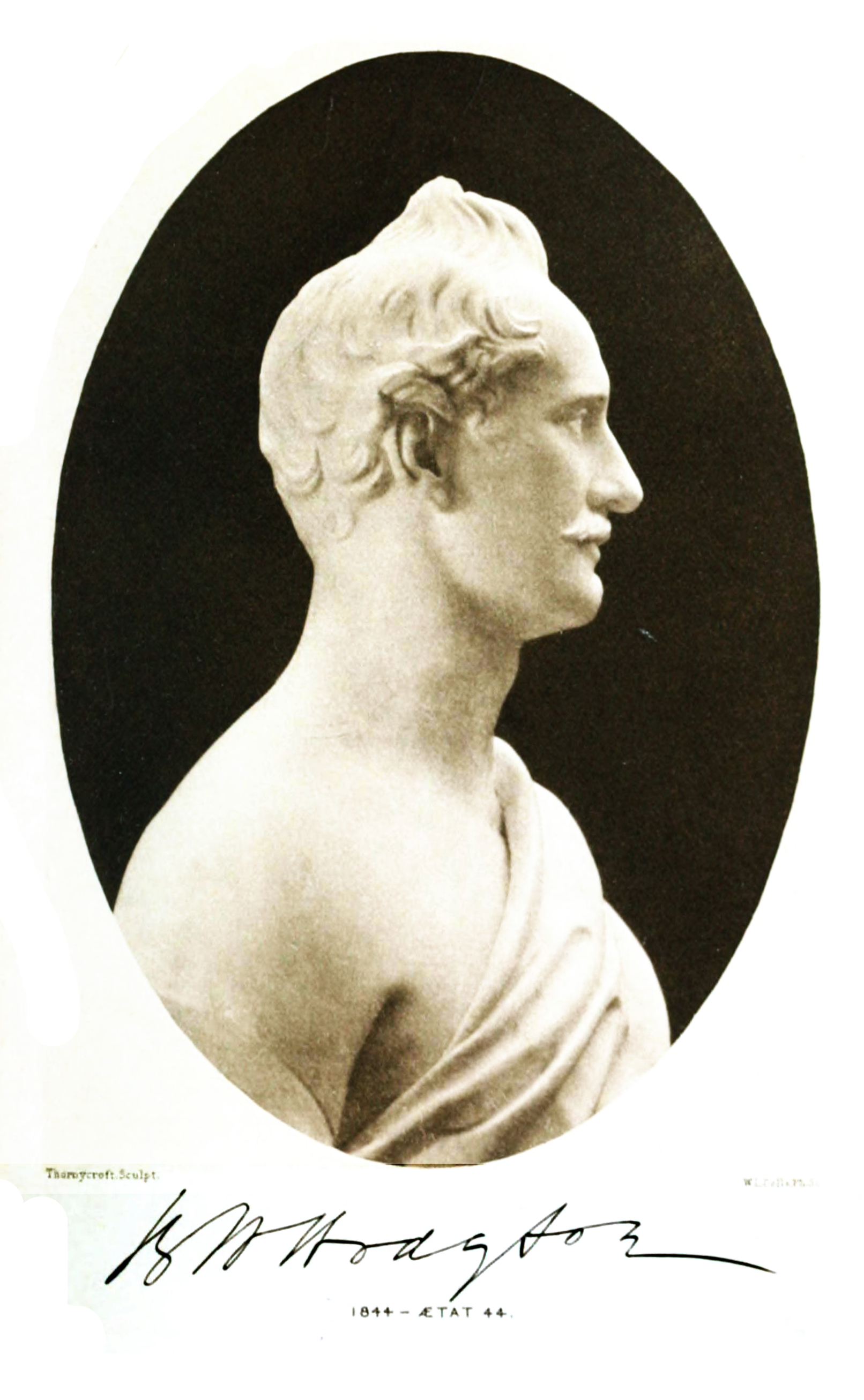
Bust of Brian Houghton Hodgson, 1896

Numerous stars of sport and entertainment have lived in Prestbury for various lengths of time, including:

- Thomas Prestbury (mid-1340s in Prestbury - 1426), medieval Benedictine abbot and university Chancellor.
- Thomas Newton (1542 in Prestbury–1607), clergyman, poet, author and translator.
- Thomas Henshaw (1731 in Prestbury – 1810), an English hatter and benefactor
- Brian Houghton Hodgson (1801 in Prestbury–1894), pioneer naturalist and ethnologist worked in India and Nepal
- Robert Burrows (1884-1964), British Industrialist served as High Sheriff of Cheshire (for 1940/41), and Chairman of the London, Midland and Scottish Railway (1946-47).
- Harry McEvoy (1902–1984), founder and CEO of the Kellogg Company of Great Britain, resident 1950–1967
- Sir David Nicholas (1930–2022), former ITN Editor-in-Chief
- David Plowright (1930-2006 at Prestbury), television executive and producer
- Geoffrey Wheeler (1930–2013), TV and radio broadcaster, died in Prestbury
- Lord Tim Hudson (1940 in Prestbury – 2019), DJ, artist, sports manager and voice actor
- Mike Yarwood (1941–2023), impressionist, comedian and actor
- Bill Hopkins (1943 in Prestbury – 1981), classical composer
- Neville Buswell (1943 in Prestbury - 2019), actor best known for his role as Ray Langton in Coronation Street.
- Petra Markham (born 1944 in Prestbury), theatre, television and film actress
- Noddy Holder (born 1946), musician, songwriter and actor, lead vocalist and rhythm guitarist with Slade
- Iain Fenlon (born 1949 in Prestbury), musicologist and academic, studies renaissance and Baroque music.
- Sir Ian Livingstone (born 1949 in Prestbury), fantasy author and entrepreneur
- Alan Green (born 1952), former sports commentator for the BBC
- Charles Lawson (born 1959), actor, plays Jim McDonald in Coronation Street.
- Jaime Harding (born ca.1970), musician and singer with Britpop band Marion
- Paddy McGuinness (born 1973), comedian, actor, writer, and TV presenter
- Coleen Rooney (born 1986), former TV personality
- Helen Flanagan (born 1990), actress and model

=== Sport ===
- Stan Pearson (1919–1997), footballer who played 490 games, including 312 for Manchester United and 8 for England; he ran a newsagent's shop and post office in Prestbury on retirement.
- Malcolm Phillips (born 1935 in Prestbury), rugby union international player who played 27 games for England
- Paul Aimson (1943 in Prestbury – 2008), footballer who played 340 games including 142 for York City F.C.
- Bobby Smith (born 1944 in Prestbury), footballer who played 280 games
- Dave Boylen (born 1947 in Prestbury), footballer who played 384 games for Grimsby Town F.C.
- Peter Mellor (born 1947 in Prestbury), English-born American footballer and coach, played 512 games
- Alex "Hurricane" Higgins (1949–2010), snooker player, lived on the border of Prestbury and Mottram St Andrew during his peak years
- Ian Seddon (born 1950 in Prestbury), footballer who played 229 games
- Robbie Savage (born 1974), former footballer who played 538 games and 39 for Wales, football pundit, now head coach at Northern Premier League club Macclesfield
- Andrew "Freddie" Flintoff (born 1977), TV and radio presenter and former international cricketer who was vice-captain of England
- Wes Brown (born 1979), former footballer who played 327 games, including 232 for Manchester United and 23 for England
- Owen Hargreaves (born 1981), former footballer who played 199 games, including 42 for England
- Michael Carrick (born 1981), football coach and former player who played 524 games, including 316 for Manchester United and 34 for England
- Peter Crouch (born 1981), former football striker who played 599 games, including 225 for Stoke City F.C. and 42 for England
- Carlos Tevez (born 1984), football manager and former player, who played 517 games including 63 for Manchester United, 113 for Manchester City and 76 for Argentina
- Wayne Rooney (born 1985), football manager and former player who played 569 games, including 393 for Manchester United and 120 for England; he moved to Prestbury after signing for United from Everton in 2004.
- Ashley Young (born 1985), footballer, has played over 600 games including 192 for Manchester United and 39 for England
- Stephen Ireland (born 1986), former footballer who played 246 games, including 148 for Manchester City and 6 for Republic of Ireland
- Ángel Di María (born 1988), footballer who signed for Manchester United in 2014 but later moved to Paris Saint-Germain in 2015
- Scott Sinclair (born 1989), footballer who played over 450 games
- Benjamin Mendy (born 1994), French footballer, lived at Prestbury while he played for Manchester City.

== 1977 bank robbery ==
In February 1977, the village made national headlines when two employees at the local branch of Williams & Glyn's Bank were murdered during a robbery. Whilst the sub-branch was closed for lunch, 22-year-old senior cashier Ian Jebb was repeatedly stabbed and his 19-year-old fiancé and assistant Susan Hockenhull was kidnapped. As the branch was staffed only by these two, the alarm was only raised when customers were unable to enter the bank after the lunchtime closing period. Hockenhull's body was later discovered on moorland, where she had died from hypothermia.

In October 1977, David Walsh, 30, who was employed as a contractor to service adding machines at the bank and who was known to the victims, was found guilty at Chester Crown Court of their murders and was sentenced to life imprisonment. He also received 15 years' imprisonment for the robbery, which had netted £2,445.

== See also ==
- Listed buildings in Prestbury, Cheshire
