= Mottram St Andrew =

Village in Cheshire, England

Coordinates: 53.302665°N 2.190981°W

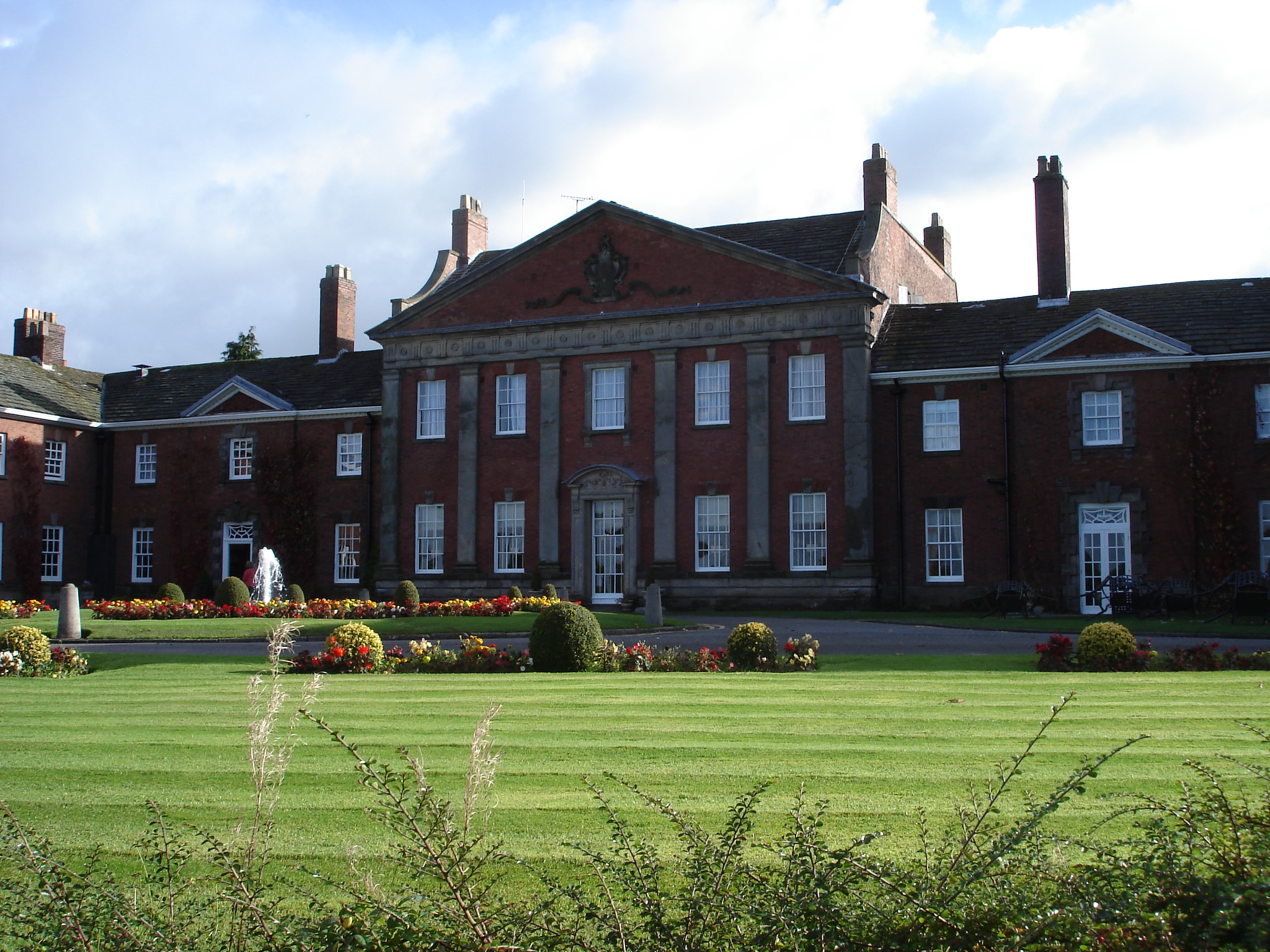
- Mottram Hall in 2012

- Location within Cheshire
- Population: 493 (2011)
- OS grid reference: SJ873784
- Civil parish: Mottram St Andrew
- Unitary authority: Cheshire East
- Ceremonial county: Cheshire
- Region: North West
- Country: England
- Sovereign state: United Kingdom
- Post town: MACCLESFIELD
- Postcode district: SK10
- Dialling code: 01625
- Police: Cheshire
- Fire: Cheshire
- Ambulance: North West
- UK Parliament: Macclesfield

Mottram St Andrew is a village and civil parish in Cheshire, England. At the 2011 census, it had a population of 493. An affluent village in the Cheshire countryside, it is in the Golden Triangle of Alderley Edge, Prestbury and Wilmslow, 15 miles from Manchester. Mottram Hall is a hotel and golfing centre; Lower Manor is the former home of the Mottershead family.

Sportsmen who have lived in the area include footballers Peter Crouch, Wayne Rooney, Owen Hargreaves, Mark Hughes, Carlos Tevez, Benjamin Mendy and Mario Balotelli, cricketer Andrew Flintoff, and snooker player Alex Higgins.

Rostrum was founded under the Yew Tree at Greendale Farm, Mottram St Andrew on 21 July 1923.

Village Cross, Wilmslow Road

There is a village cross on the Wilmslow Road, NW of the crossroads. It consists of a Victorian shaft & cross set in a medieval socket base on a single step calvary. It is mostly in its original position, albeit set back from the road.

== See also ==
- Listed buildings in Mottram St Andrew
