= Listed buildings in Brereton, Cheshire =

Brereton is a civil parish in Cheshire East, England. It contains 21 buildings that are recorded in the National Heritage List for England as designated listed buildings. Of these, one is recorded at Grade I, the top grade, three are classified at Grade II*, the intermediate grade, and the others are at Grade II. The parish remains largely rural. The major building in the parish is Brereton Hall. The listed buildings consist of the hall and associated buildings, the church and a sundial in its churchyard, a public house, a former mill, farmhouses and farm buildings, houses or cottages, and three mileposts.

== Key ==
Grade	Criteria
I	Buildings of exceptional interest, sometimes considered to be internationally important
II*	Particularly important buildings of more than special interest
II	Buildings of national importance and special interest

== Buildings ==
Name and location	Photograph	Date	Notes	Grade
St Oswald's Church; 53.17973°N 2.32845°W		c. 1550	The church was restored in 1903. It is constructed in sandstone, and is in Perpendicular style. The church consists of a nave with a clerestory, aisles, a chancel and a west tower embraced by the aisles. The tower has a battlemented parapet and crocketed pinnacles.	II*
Brereton Hall; 53.18038°N 2.32869°W		1585	The hall was altered in 1829, and again later in the century. It is built in brick with stone dressings, and has roofs of lead and slate. The hall has a U-shaped plan with a symmetrical front, and is in two storeys with a basement. At the centre is a gateway with two turrets flanked by two bays. These are in turn flanked by cross-wings. The windows are mullioned and transomed.	I
Bear's Head Hotel; 53.17575°N 2.33719°W		1615	The hotel was later extended. It is timber-framed with a slate roof, and has a brick wing to the left. The building is in two storeys with attics. On the front are two jettied gables, two porches, a Georgian bay window, and an oriel window.	II*
Holly Cottage; 53.16266°N 2.32464°W	—	Early 17th century (probable)	The cottage is partly timber-framed, and partly in brick, and has been pebbledashed. The roof is tiled. The cottage is in a single storey with an attic, and has casement windows. Inside is an inglenook and a bressumer.	II
Duke's Oak Farmhouse; 53.17166°N 2.34085°W	—	Late 17th century	The farmhouse was altered and extended in the 19th century. It is built in brick with a tiled roof. The farmhouse is in two storeys with attics, and has a gabled porch with a pointed archway. The windows are casements.	II
The Cottage; 53.16295°N 2.32453°W	—	Late 17th century (probable)	A timber-framed cottage with brick nogging, which has been partly replaced in brick, with a tiled roof. It is in a single storey with an attic. The windows are casements.	II
Gazebo and wall, Brereton Hall; 53.18107°N 2.32785°W	—	Early 18th century (probable)	The former gazebo is attached to the wall of the walled garden. It is constructed in brick with a slate roof. On the front are two arches, an inscribed panel, and a stone-dressed window. The wall has a triangular stone coping.	II
Old Rectory; 53.17887°N 2.33242°W		Early 18th century (probable)	The former rectory was altered and extended in the 19th century. It is built in brick with a tiled roof, is in two storeys with attics, and has a symmetrical front. The central bay projects slightly forward and contains a doorway with a fanlight. In the centre of the ridge above this is a lantern with a pyramidal roof. The windows are sashes.	II
Sundial; 53.17959°N 2.32839°W		18th century (probable)	The sundial is in the churchyard of St Oswald's Church. It is in stone, and consists of a cruciform stem on a circular plinth, which is itself on a circular step. It has an octagonal cap with a copper dial and gnomon, the dial being inscribed with names.	II
Brindley Green Farmhouse; 53.16097°N 2.34500°W	—	Late 18th century (probable)	The farmhouse is in brick with a slate roof. It is in three stories, and has a symmetrical entrance front with an open pediment. On the sides are short, slightly recessed wings. The windows are casements. At the rear is a 20th-century extension.	II
Garden chamber, Brereton Hall; 53.18119°N 2.32758°W	—	Late 18th century (probable)	This was a garden chamber or grotto in the walled garden of the hall, and is located at the end of a sunken ornamental canal. It is built in brick and stone, and has a vaulted roof. Much of it is below ground level.	II
Milepost; 53.17737°N 2.33905°W	—	Early 19th century (probable)	The milepost was originally on a turnpike road. It is in cast iron and consists of a cylindrical post with a curved plate inscribed with the distances in miles to Church Lawton, Newcastle, Holmes Chapel, Knutsford, Warrington, and Liverpool. Another plate on the post bears the name of the maker.	II
Milepost; 53.16520°N 2.32842°W	—	Early 19th century (probable)	The milepost was originally on a turnpike road. It is in cast iron and consists of a cylindrical post with a curved plate inscribed with the distances in miles to Church Lawton, Newcastle, Holmes Chapel, Knutsford, Warrington, and Liverpool. Another plate on the post bears the name of the maker.	II
Milepost; 53.18944°N 2.34906°W	—	Early 19th century (probable)	The milepost was originally on a turnpike road. It is in cast iron and consists of a cylindrical post with a broken curved plate. It is inscribed with the distances in miles to Brereton, Church Lawton, and Newcastle. Another plate on the post bears the name of the maker.	II
Stable block, Brereton Hall; 53.18123°N 2.32893°W	—	c. 1829	The former stables have been converted. They are built in brick with stone-slate roofs. The front is in two storeys with a symmetrical six-bay front. In the centre is a blocked archway, above which is a pediment containing a clock. At the sides are two-light casement windows. On the roof is an octagonal loured cupola. The buildings behind form a courtyard.	II
Haybarn, Park House Farm; 53.18891°N 2.34115°W		1830	The barn is built in brick with a corrugated iron roof. The front is in five bays that are separated by brick pillars. On each side is a pointed arch.	II
Lodge, Brereton Hall School; 53.17554°N 2.33535°W	—	c. 1830	The lodge is built in sandstone and consists of a Tudor archway flanked by octagonal turrets, each with a lean-to wing. The turrets are crenelated and in two storeys. There are mullioned and transomed windows in both storeys at the front and the back. In the canted inner faces of each of the turrets is a doorway and a cross-shaped arrow loop above it.	II
Park House Farmhouse; 53.18831°N 2.34066°W		1830s	The farmhouse is built in brick, and has two storeys. The doorcase is pedimented, and above it is a fanlight. The windows are sashes with wedge lintels.	II
Farm buildings, Park House Farm; 53.18863°N 2.34092°W		1830s	The farm buildings are in brick, and form three sides of a courtyard. The rear wing has a slate roof, and the roofs of the side wings are tiled. In the rear wing is a central gable above which is a blocked pigeon left.	II
Park Mill and Park Cottage; 53.18919°N 2.34037°W		c. 1840	This is a former water mill with an attached cottage. The buildings are in brick with tiled roofs. The mill is in two and three storeys, and has a tall tapered square chimney. The windows are casements. The mill has been converted into flats.	II*
Stable, shippon, and engine house, Brereton Hall; 53.18206°N 2.32836°W	—	c. 1850	The stable, shippon, and former engine house are built in brick with slate roofs. They are in two storeys, and form an L-shaped plan. The stable and shippon were in the left wing, and contain a stable door, casement windows, and pitch holes. The other wing was the engine house, and has a tapered octagonal chimney stack.	II

== See also ==
- Listed buildings in Newbold Astbury
- Listed buildings in Bradwall
- Listed buildings in Holmes Chapel
- Listed buildings in Swettenham
- Listed buildings in Sproston
- Listed buildings in Sandbach
- Listed buildings in Arclid
- Listed buildings in Smallwood
- Listed buildings in Somerford Booths
