= St Oswald's Church, Brereton =

Coordinates: 53.1797°N 2.3285°W

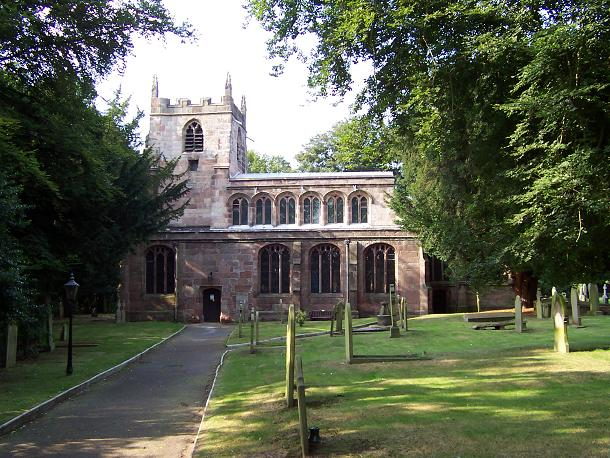
- St Oswald's Church, Brereton, from the south

- Location in Cheshire
- OS grid reference: SJ 782 648
- Location: Brererton Green, Cheshire
- Country: England
- Denomination: Anglican
- Website: St Oswald, Brereton

History
- Status: Parish church

Architecture
- Functional status: Active
- Heritage designation: Grade II*
- Designated: 14 February 1967
- Architectural type: Church
- Style: Perpendicular

Specifications
- Materials: Red sandstone

Administration
- Province: York
- Diocese: Chester
- Archdeaconry: Macclesfield
- Deanery: Congleton
- Parish: Brereton

Clergy
- Rector: Revd Alexandria Compton Fisher

St Oswald's Church is north of the village of Brereton Green, adjacent to Brereton Hall, in the civil parish of Brereton, Cheshire, England, on the banks of the River Croco. It is recorded in the National Heritage List for England as a designated Grade II* listed building, and is described as "an unusually complete late Perpendicular church". It is an active Anglican parish church in the diocese of Chester, the archdeaconry of Macclesfield and the deanery of Congleton. Its benefice is combined with those of Christ Church, Eaton, and St Michael, Hulme Walfield.

== History ==
A chapel was on the site of the church in the reign of Richard I. At that time it was in the parish of Astbury and it became a parish church in the reign of Henry VIII. The present church dates from around 1550 and it was restored in 1903.

== Architecture ==
=== Exterior ===
The church is built in Perpendicular style in red sandstone. Its plan consists of a tower at the west end, a four-bay nave with a clerestory, north and south aisles, and a two-bay chancel. The tower is embraced by the west ends of the aisles. It is surmounted by a battlemented parapet and crocketed pinnacles. There is no chancel arch, but the chancel roof is lower than that of the nave. The nave and aisle roofs have parapets while the chancel is embattled.

=== Interior ===
The roofs of the nave and chancel are camber beamed and panelled. The altar rails, which date from the 17th century, are "very ornamental". The altar table and the richly carved sanctuary chair are from the middle of the 17th century, and the octagonal font dated is 1660. The stained glass in the east and west windows is by William Wailes. The east window has five lights. In the sanctuary is a monument to William Brereton, who died in 1618, and in the south aisle is a monument to William Smethwick, who died in 1643, and his wife Frances, who died in 1632. The organ was rebuilt in 1974 by Reeves. There is a ring of six bells. Three of these were cast in 1634 by Paul Hutton. Later bells were cast by Abel Rudhall in 1739, Mears and Stainbank of the Whitechapel Bell Foundry in 1905 and by John Taylor Bellfounders in 2003. The parish registers begin in 1538.

== External features ==
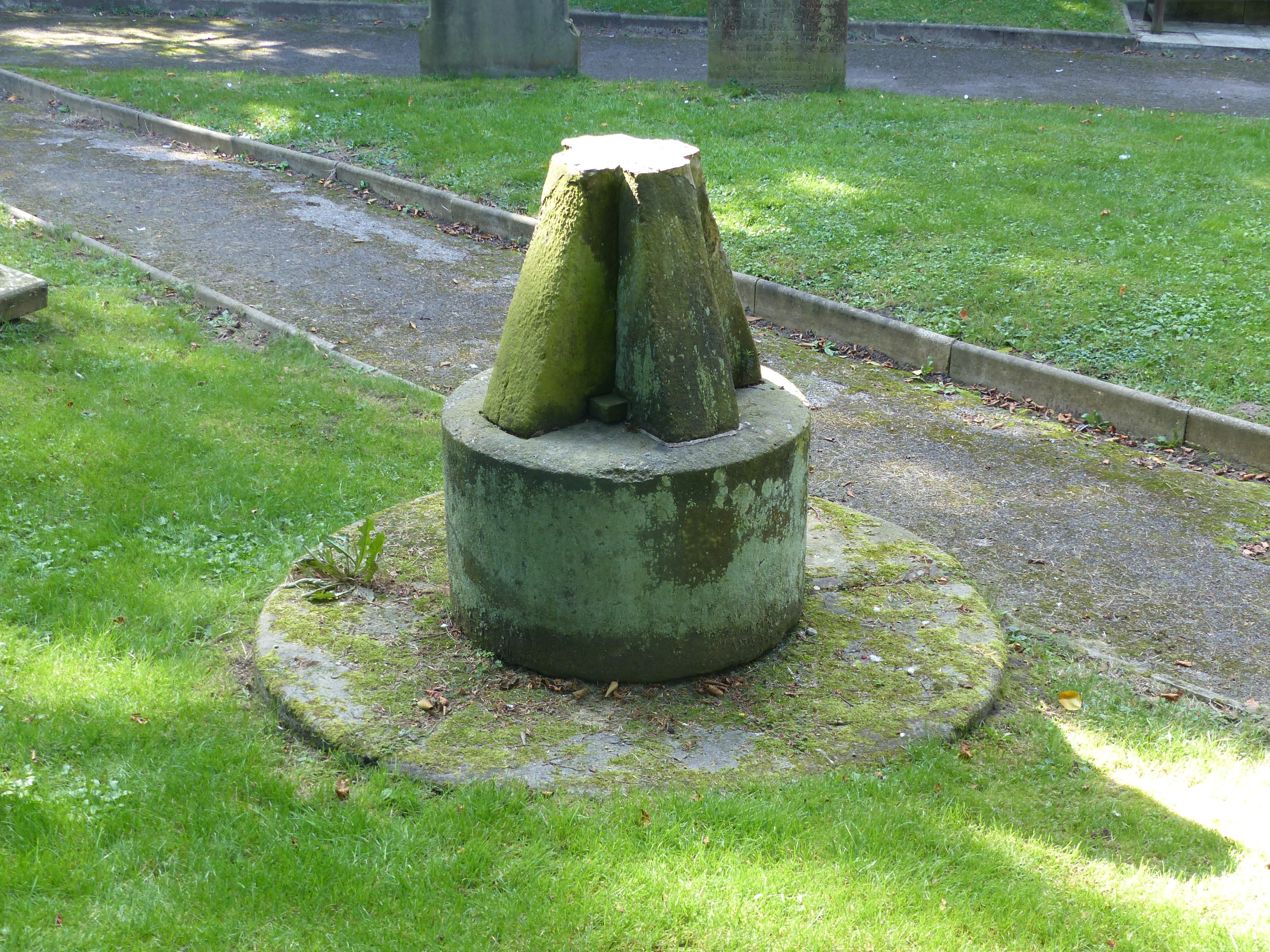
Sundial in churchyard

In the churchyard is a stone sundial of unusual design dating probably from the 18th century. It consists of a circular plinth on a circular stone step which carries a battered cruciform stem with an octagonal cap. The dial and gnomon are copper. It is listed Grade II. At the churchyard gate is an 18th-century mounting block. Also in the churchyard is the war grave of a First World War Canadian soldier.

== Burials ==
- William Brereton, 1st Baron Brereton
- William Brereton, 2nd Baron Brereton
- John Brereton, 4th Baron Brereton

== See also ==
- Grade II* listed buildings in Cheshire East
- Listed buildings in Brereton, Cheshire
