= River Croco =

River in Cheshire, England

Coordinates: 53.1567°N 2.2739°W

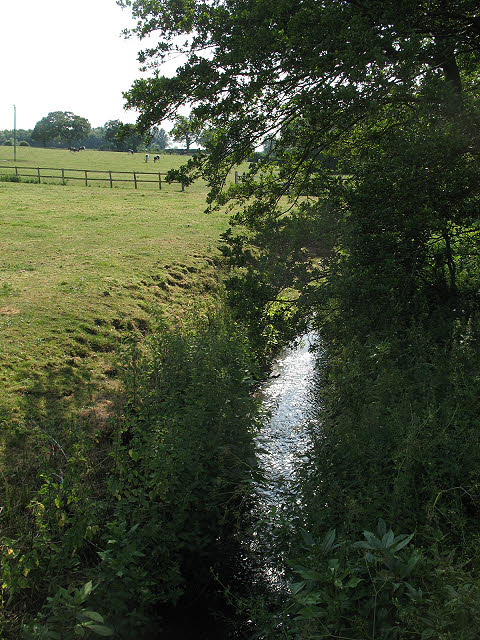
The River Croco near Sproston Green

The River Croco (/kroʊ.koʊ/) is a small river in Cheshire in England. It starts as lowland field drainage west of Congleton, flows along the south edge of Holmes Chapel, and joins the River Dane at Middlewich. It is about 8 miles (13 km) long.

According to a historical account, dating back to 1585, the course of the River Croco begins west of Bag Mere, Brereton cum Smethwick:

That which they call the Croco is a small Brook, which cometh out of Bagmer-mere, and passeth by Brereton church and hall (the ancient house of the surname of Breretons) through Brereton park, Kinderton park, through Middlewich, and not far from thence, falleth into the Dane at Croxton, near the same place, where the Wheelock falleth in also.

The Place-Names of England and Wales (1915) suggests that the name Croco may be Celtic or even earlier.

Historical maps show the source of the river to be the lowland field drainage system to the northeast of Brookhouse Green. From here, the river heads north past the hamlet of Illidge Green and then northwest via Brereton Hall, where a weir and boathouse were created to the west of Saint Oswald's Church. The river flows northwest towards Parkmill Farm, where another weir was constructed to form Brereton Pool. It then heads towards Holmes Chapel before turning west and passing under London Road (A50) at Alum Bridge. The river continues this westward course, passing under the M6 and Poolford Lane near Cinderhill and then Brereton Lane, north of Dockbank Farm at Sproston. The river continues its westward journey via Fender Wood. Winding its way north of Kinderton Lodge towards Middlewich, it is joined by Sanderson's Brook southeast of the town, near Brooks Lane. It then heads northwest on the right-hand side of the Trent and Mersey Canal until it joins the River Dane at the northwest corner of Harbutt's Field.

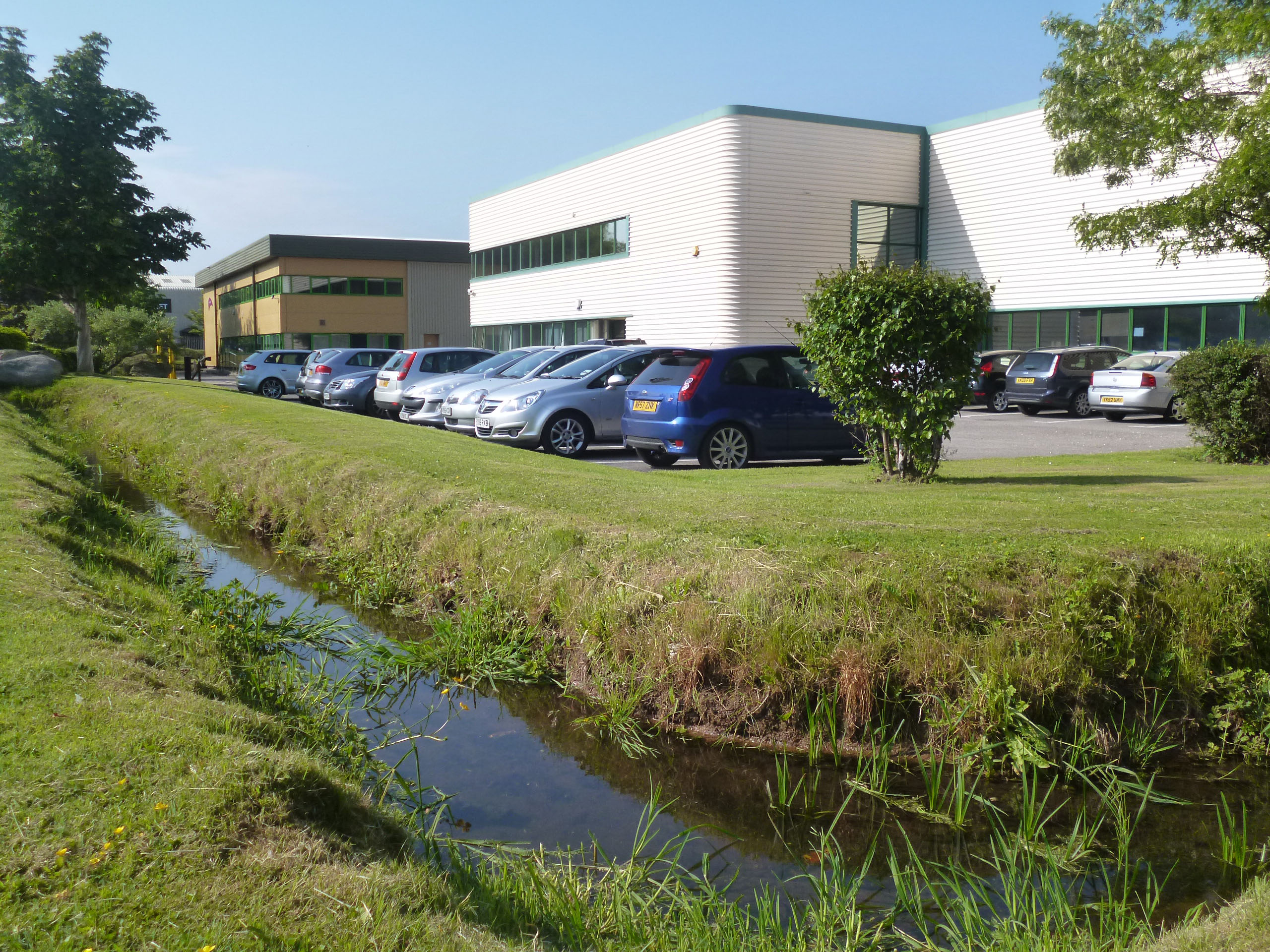
A watercourse passes through the Midpoint 18 business park in Middlewich

Back in Fender Wood, a weir feeds a channel of water to supply a historical mill race; this watercourse follows the field boundaries, past what was Brookhouse Farm, then under Pochin Way (historically the start of Lodge Lane), through Midpoint 18 business park and under Holmes Chapel Road, before running through the garden of the bungalow to the east of the Old Station House. Here, it disappears through a culvert towards the railway embankment. Historically, this watercourse would have fed the mill pond that powered the Kinderton Corn Mill, as shown in the 1882 Ordnance Survey map.

The elevation of the River Croco is about 85 m (280 ft) at source, falling to 27 m (89 ft) at the point where it flows into the River Dane.
