= Astbury, Cheshire =

Village in Cheshire, England

Coordinates: 53.151°N 2.232°W

Astbury
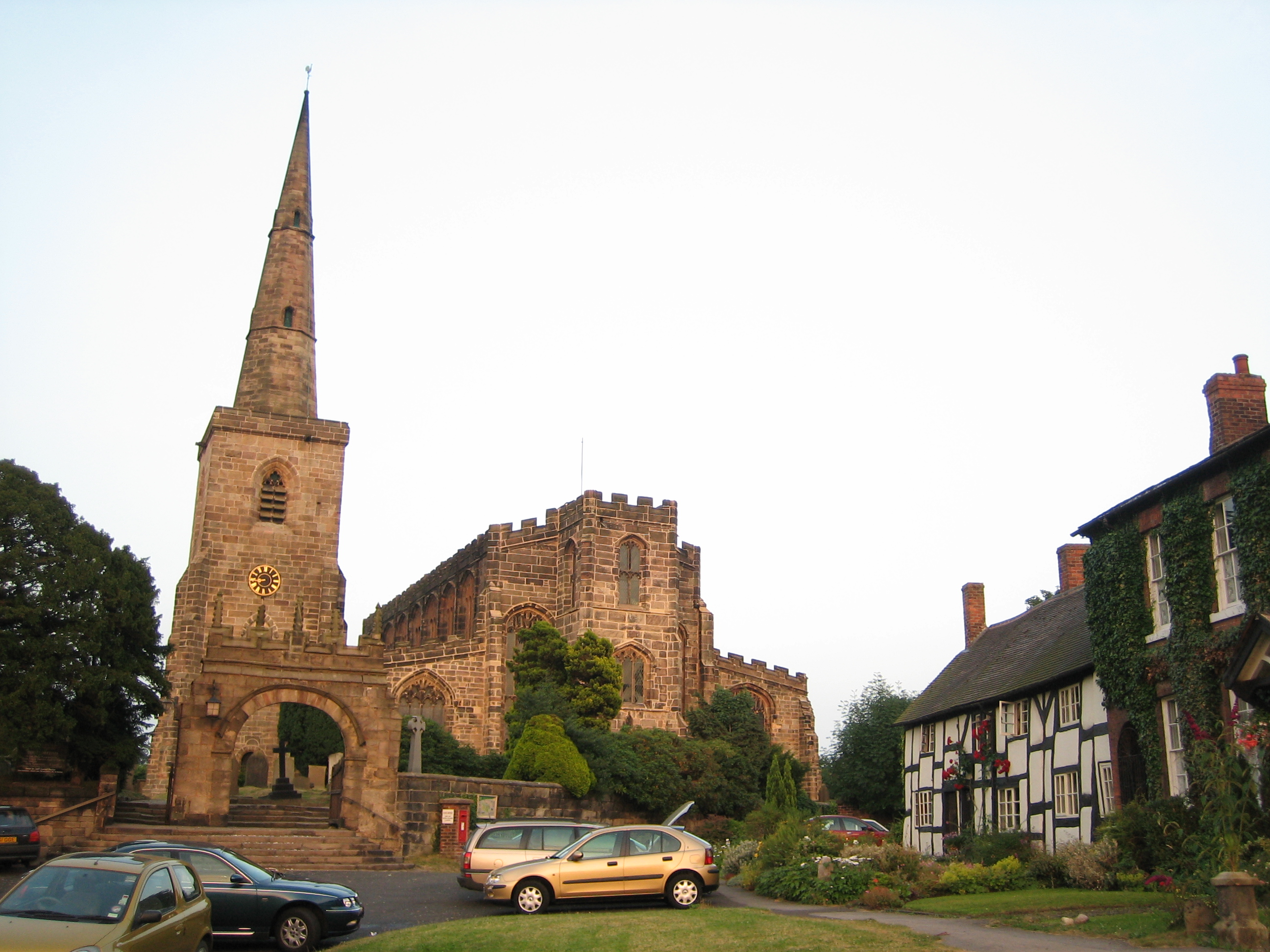
- St Mary's Church

- Location within Cheshire
- Population: 569 (Newbold Astbury parish, 2021)
- OS grid reference: SJ841612
- Civil parish: Newbold Astbury
- Unitary authority: Cheshire East
- Ceremonial county: Cheshire
- Region: North West
- Country: England
- Sovereign state: United Kingdom
- Post town: CONGLETON
- Postcode district: CW12
- Dialling code: 01260
- Police: Cheshire
- Fire: Cheshire
- Ambulance: North West
- UK Parliament: Congleton

Astbury is a village in Cheshire East, Cheshire, England. It lies 1.1 miles (1.8 km) south-west of the town of Congleton on the A34 road, which forms one side of the village green. The parish of Astbury historically covered a large area, also including Congleton and several surrounding hamlets. It was subdivided into smaller civil parishes in 1866, with the civil parish covering the village of Astbury taking the name Newbold Astbury.

== Toponymy ==
The name Astbury is thought to derive from 'East Bury', with the village having grown up in Anglo-Saxon times to the east of the site of a Roman camp at Bent Farm.

== Geography ==
Astbury is centred on a village green which lies to the west of St Mary's Church, with the A34 running along the western edge of the green. The village also has a primary school, village hall and public house. Aside from Astbury village, the remainder of Newbold Astbury parish is rural with various farms. The Macclesfield Canal passes through the parish to the east of Astbury village. The eastern boundary of the parish is a ridge of high ground which also forms the county boundary with Staffordshire. The Gritstone Trail and Staffordshire Way footpaths run along the ridge.

== History ==
There is some evidence of occupation in the area during the Neolithic era and Bronze Age. A Roman camp existed at the junction of two Roman roads at Bent Farm, to the west of the modern village.

In the Domesday Book of 1086, Astbury is not named, but it appears to have been a small manor within the township of Newbold, which is named. Newbold was recorded as having a priest and church land, presumed to refer to the church at Astbury and its priest.

It appears that Newbold and Astbury were separate settlements in the same township, Newbold giving its name to the township and Astbury (having the church) giving its name to the wider parish. Newbold was sometimes referred to as 'Newbold by Astbury' or 'Newbold in Astbury'. There is no settlement called Newbold today; the medieval Newbold may have been centred on a moated manor house at Peel Farm to the east of Astbury. The township was sometimes referred to as 'Newbold and Astbury' before the township's name settled as 'Newbold Astbury'.

== Governance ==
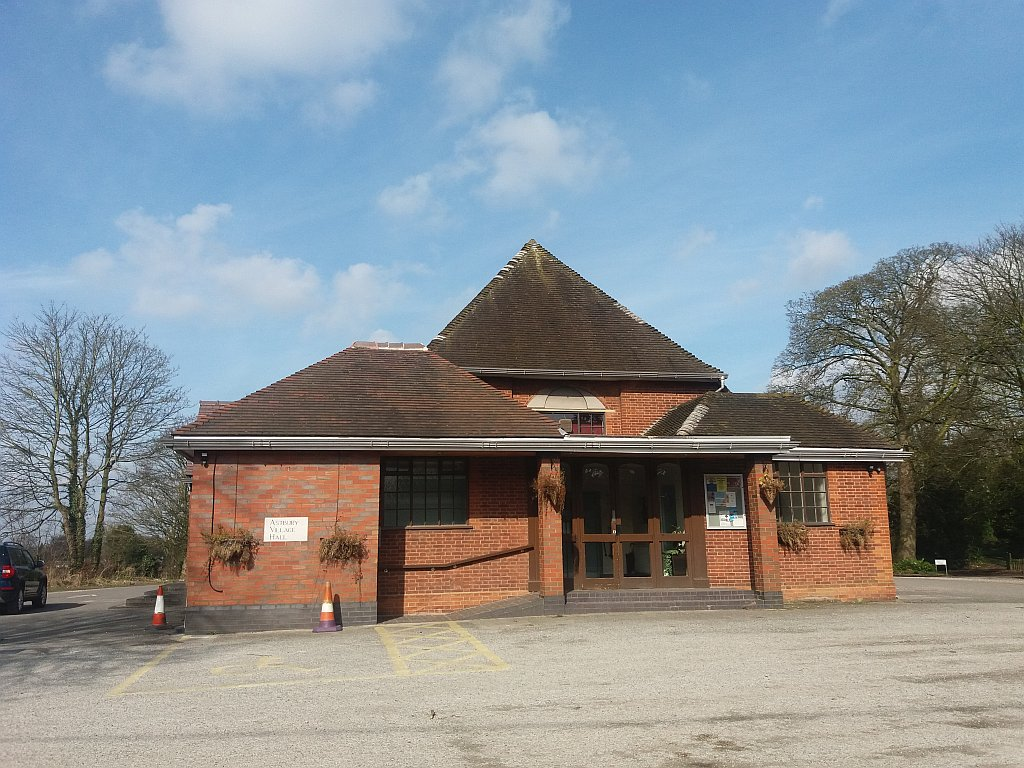
Astbury village hall

There are two tiers of local government covering Astbury, at parish and unitary authority level: Newbold Astbury cum Moreton Parish Council, and Cheshire East Council. The parish council is a grouped parish council, covering the two civil parishes of Newbold Astbury and Moreton cum Alcumlow. The parish council generally meets at the village hall in Astbury.

=== Administrative history ===
Astbury was an ancient parish, straddling the Macclesfield Hundred and Northwich Hundred of Cheshire. The parish was divided into twelve townships. The village of Astbury, which had the parish church, was in the township of Newbold Astbury. The townships were:

- Buglawton
- Congleton
- Davenport
- Eaton
- Hulme Walfield
- Moreton cum Alcumlow
- Newbold Astbury
- Odd Rode
- Radnor
- Smallwood
- Somerford
- Somerford Booths

From the 17th century onwards, parishes were gradually given various civil functions under the poor laws, in addition to their original ecclesiastical functions. In some cases, including Astbury, the civil functions were exercised by each township separately rather than the parish as a whole. In 1866, the legal definition of 'parish' was changed to be the areas used for administering the poor laws, and so each township became a civil parish. There has therefore been no civil parish called Astbury since 1866, although the name of the ecclesiastical parish remains Astbury.

Newbold Astbury was placed under a grouped parish council with neighbouring Moreton cum Alcumlow in 1975.

== Landmarks ==
St. Mary's at Astbury is a large 12th-century church, rebuilt on a unique trapezoidal plan in the 13th and 14th centuries. There is a 14th-century effigy of a knight in the Lady Chapel, and another, possibly earlier, canopied tomb in the churchyard. A fragment of a Saxon cross is built into the exterior wall. Ada, fourth daughter of David, 9th Earl of Huntingdon (c1144-1219), is buried here. The church stands at the apex of the village green and is in the Early English and Perpendicular styles, built between the 13th and 15th centuries. The church was built of millstone grit and the detached spire of the mid-14th century looks to be earlier. Inside the proportions and the furniture are both distinguished. The fine woodwork includes 15th-century stalls, screen, and magnificent roofs. Sir Gilbert Scott was responsible for a modest restoration in 1862.

== See also ==
- Listed buildings in Newbold Astbury
