= St John the Baptist's Church, Smallwood =

Coordinates: 53.1382°N 2.2913°W

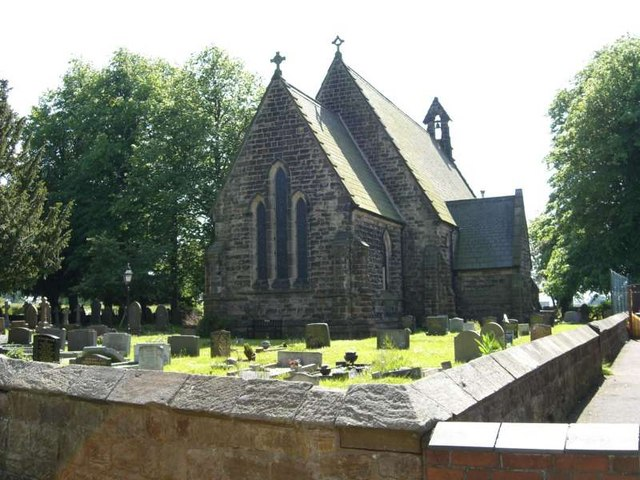
- St John the Baptist's Church, Smallwood, from the northeast

- Location in Cheshire
- OS grid reference: SJ 806 602
- Location: Church Lane, Smallwood, Cheshire
- Country: England
- Denomination: Anglican
- Website: St John the Baptist, Smallwood

History
- Status: Parish church
- Dedication: Saint John the Baptist

Architecture
- Functional status: Active
- Heritage designation: Grade II
- Designated: 26 March 1987
- Architect(s): Charles and James Trubshaw
- Architectural type: Church
- Style: Gothic Revival
- Groundbreaking: 1843
- Completed: 1846

Specifications
- Materials: Sandstone, slate roofs

Administration
- Province: York
- Diocese: Chester
- Archdeaconry: Macclesfield
- Deanery: Congleton
- Parish: Smallwood

Clergy
- Rector: Revd Anne-Marie Naylor

St John the Baptist's Church is in Church Lane, Smallwood, Cheshire, England. It is an active Anglican parish church in the deanery of Congleton, the archdeaconry of Macclesfield, and the diocese of Chester. Its benefice is combined with those of St Mary, Astbury, and All Saints, Somerford. The church is recorded in the National Heritage List for England as a designated Grade II listed building.

== History ==
St John's was built between 1843 and 1846, and designed by Charles and James Trubshaw.

== Architecture ==
The church is constructed in yellow sandstone rubble with ashlar dressings and has slate roofs. Its plan consists of a nave, a southwest porch, a chancel, and a northwest vestry. On the west gable is a single bellcote. The windows are lancets, some of which contain Y-tracery. At the east end is a triple stepped lancet window. At the corners of the church are angle buttresses. Inside the church is a hammerbeam roof.

== See also ==
- Listed buildings in Smallwood, Cheshire
