= William Brereton, 2nd Baron Brereton =

English Royalist landowner and politician

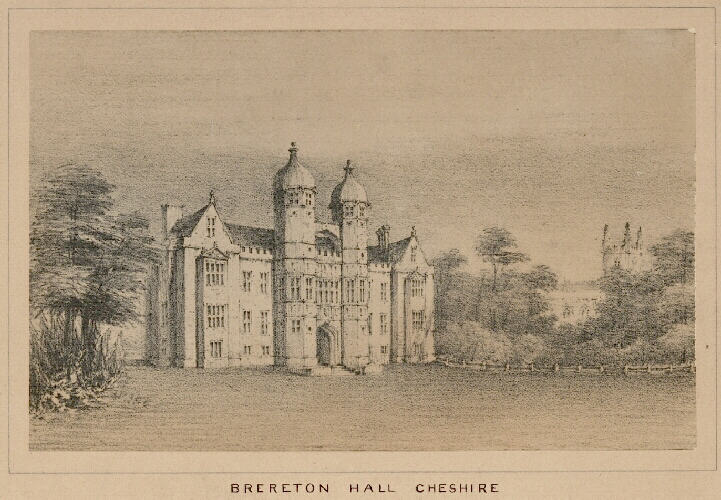
- Family home, Brereton Hall

Joint Lord Lieutenant of Cheshire
- In office July 1660 – July 1662

Member of Parliament for Cheshire
- In office 1661–1664

Personal details
- Born: 28 February 1611
- Died: 21 April 1664 (aged 53) Brereton Hall
- Resting place: St Oswald's Church, Brereton
- Spouse: Elizabeth Goring (1629–her death)
- Children: William (1631–1680); Thomas (1635-1683); Henry (1636–1659); George (1638–1672); Elizabeth (1645–1724); others

Military service
- Allegiance: Royalist
- Battles/wars: First English Civil War; Biddulph House (POW); Booth's Uprising

William Brereton, 2nd Baron Brereton (28 February 1611 – April 1664) was an English landowner from Cheshire and member of the Peerage of Ireland who owned estates in County Carlow. A Royalist sympathiser during the Wars of the Three Kingdoms, after the 1660 Stuart Restoration he served as joint Lord Lieutenant of Cheshire and Member of Parliament for Cheshire from 1661 to 1664.

== Personal details ==
Born on 28 February 1611, Brereton was the eldest son of Sir John Brereton (1591–1629), and Anne (1594–1663), daughter of Sir Edward Fitton (1572–1619), owner of Gawsworth Old Hall. Sir John was heir apparent to Sir William Brereton, 1st Baron Brereton of Brereton Hall (1550–1631); his death in 1629 made Brereton the new heir, while his mother remarried, this time to Sir Gilbert Gerard (died 1646), Royalist Governor of Worcester during the First English Civil War.

One of five surviving children, William had two brothers, John (1624–1656) and Edward, along with two sisters; Jane (died 1648), and Mary (died 1652), whose second husband was another member of the Gerard family, Sir Gilbert Gerard, 1st Baronet of Fiskerton (died 1687).

In 1629, Brereton married Lady Elizabeth Goring (1615–1687), daughter of George Goring, 1st Earl of Norwich and another substantial Cheshire family. They had a total of 14 children including his heir William (1631–1680), Thomas (1635-1683), Henry (1636–1659), George (1638–1672) and Elizabeth (1645–1724). Several of his daughters died unmarried, as the financial losses he suffered during the civil war made it impossible to provide them with dowries.

In 1661 William became 2nd Baron Brereton after the death of his grandfather Sir William Brereton, 1st Baronet.

== Career ==
The Brereton family had been established in Cheshire since the 14th century and was split into a number of different branches; the senior line was based at Handforth Hall and headed by another Sir William Brereton (1604–1661), a Puritan who led Parliamentarian forces in Cheshire during the civil war. In 1624, Brereton's grandfather purchased an Irish barony and was appointed Baron Brereton of Leighlin in Leinster, a title inherited by his grandson along with his lands when he died on 1 October 1631.

He held no military commission during the First English Civil War but in August 1642 was appointed a Commissioner of Array for Cheshire by Charles I, and installed a Royalist garrison at Brereton Hall. Captured in 1644 when Biddulph House in Staffordshire surrendered to Parliamentarian forces, he was restored to his estates by the Committee for Compounding with Delinquents after paying a fine of £2,539.

Although associated with Booth's Uprising in August 1659, he escaped arrest and after the 1660 Stuart Restoration was appointed joint Lord Lieutenant of Cheshire and served as Member of Parliament for Cheshire between 1661 and 1664. He died in April 1664 and was buried on 21 April 1664 in St Oswald's Church, Brereton. Upon his death, his eldest son became William Brereton, 3rd Baron Brereton.

== Sources ==
- Hampson, Gillian (1983). "Brereton, William, 2nd Baron Brereton of Laghlin [I] (1611–64), of Brereton Hall, Cheshire.". In Henning, B.D. (ed.). History of Parliament: the House of Commons 1660-1690. Boydell and Brewer.
- Kyle, Chris (2010). Thrush, Andrew (ed.). BRERETON, Sir William (1550-1631), of Brereton, Cheshire in History of Parliament: the House of Commons 1604-1629. CUP.
- Brereton-Goodwin, Faye (2013). The Breretons of Cheshire. E-books.
- Morrill, John (2013). "Brereton, Sir William, first baronet". Oxford Dictionary of National Biography (online ed.). Oxford University Press. doi:10.1093/ref:odnb/3333. (Subscription, Wikipedia Library access or UK public library membership required.)

Parliament of England
Preceded by Sir George Booth, Bt; Sir Thomas Mainwaring, Bt	Member of Parliament for Cheshire; 1661–1664; With: Peter Venables	Succeeded by Sir Fulk Lucy; Peter Venables
Honorary titles
Preceded by The Earl of Derby	Lord Lieutenant of Cheshire; 1662–1664 with The Earl of Derby	Succeeded by The Earl of Derby
Peerage of Ireland
Preceded by William Brereton	Baron Brereton; 1631–1664	Succeeded by William Brereton
