= William Brereton, 1st Baron Brereton =

English politician

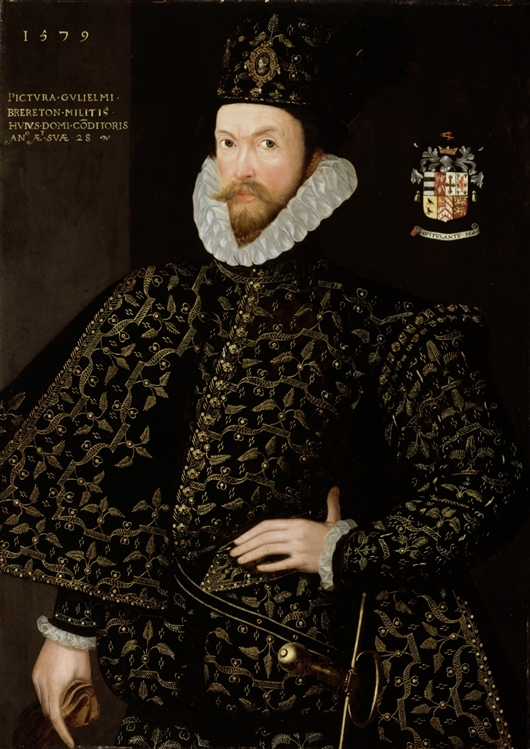
William Brereton, 1st Baron Brereton, aged 28, 1579.

William Brereton, 1st Baron Brereton (1550 – 1 October 1631) was an English politician who sat in the House of Commons at various times between 1597 and 1622. He was created a peer in the Peerage of Ireland in 1624 as Baron Brereton.

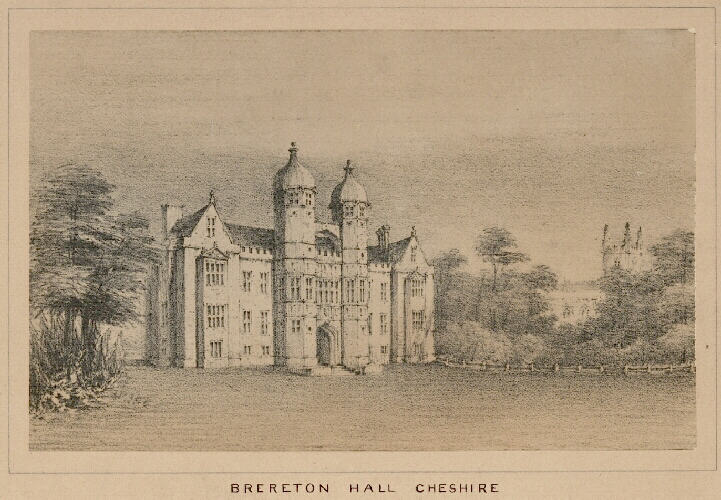
Brereton Hall

== Biography ==
Brereton was the son of Sir William Brereton of Brereton, Cheshire and was baptised on 6 February 1550. He was about nine when his father died in 1559 and he succeeded to the extensive family estates. He was educated at Oxford University and was awarded a BA in 1568. He was admitted at Lincoln's Inn in 1569. From 1573, he was JP for Cheshire and was High Sheriff of Cheshire from 1581 to 1582. In 1586, he built a mansion at Brereton (Brereton Hall) which was similar to Rocksavage, the house of his father-in-law Sir John Savage. He was knighted in 1588. He was commissioner for musters in 1595 and in 1596.

In 1597, Brereton was elected Member of Parliament for Cheshire. He was elected MP for Cheshire again in 1614 and in 1621. He had an estate near Old Leighlin, from which he and his heirs were absentee landlords. He was created Baron Brereton of Leighlin in the County of Carlow on 11 May 1624. William Brereton died at the age of about 80 and was buried at Brereton.

== Family ==
William Brereton married Margaret Savage, daughter of Sir John Savage of Rocksavage, Cheshire, and Lady Elizabeth Manners (d. 1570), daughter of Thomas Manners, 1st Earl of Rutland. They had four sons and four daughters. Most of them died young, and two who survived to marry were:

- Mary Brereton, who married on 18 July 1608, Henry O'Brien, 5th Earl of Thomond
- Sir John Brereton (born 25 March 1591), heir apparent, who married Anne Fitton, daughter of Sir Edward Fitton of Gawsworth Old Hall, and died in the lifetime of his father. With his wife Anne (who married secondly, Sir Gilbert Gerard), he had three sons and two daughters:
  - William Brereton (1611–1664), successor of his grandfather as 2nd Baron Brereton.
  - John Brereton (1624 – 22 October 1656)
  - Edward Brereton
  - Mary Brereton, who married Sir Michael Hutchinson.
  - Jane Brereton (died 1648), the eventual heiress of the family, who married around 1646, Sir Robert Holte. Their son was Sir Charles Holte, 3rd Baronet.

Parliament of England
Preceded by Thomas Holcroft; John Done	Member of Parliament for Cheshire; 1597–1601; With: Thomas Egerton	Succeeded by Sir Peter Legh; Thomas Holcroft
Preceded by Sir Roger Aston; Sir Thomas Holcroft	Member of Parliament for Cheshire; 1614–1622; With: Sir Roger Wilbraham 1614–1621; Sir Richard Grosvenor 1621–1624	Succeeded by William Booth; William Brereton
Peerage of Ireland
New creation	Baron Brereton; 1624–1631	Succeeded by William Brereton
