= John Brereton, 4th Baron Brereton =

John Brereton (1659–1718) was an English baron in the Peerage of Ireland.

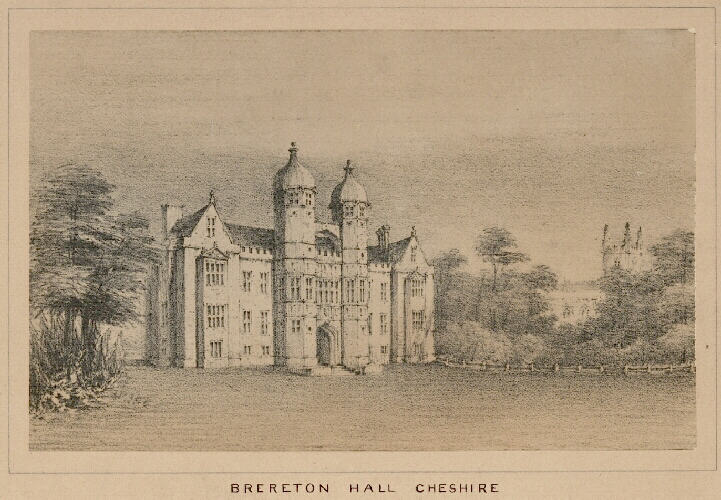
Brereton Hall, the seat of the Brereton family.

He was born on 2 December 1659, the son of the William Brereton, 3rd Baron Brereton, and his wife Frances Willoughby. He lived at Brereton Hall near Sandbach, Cheshire. He inherited the Barony upon his father's death in 1679 and became a member of the House of Lords, but did not sit in James II's parliament of 7 May 1689.

He married Mary (1655–1715) the youngest daughter of Sir Thomas Tipping of Wheatfield Park in Oxfordshire, but they had no children and he was succeeded by his brother, Francis Brereton, 5th Baron Brereton.

Peerage of Ireland
Preceded by William Brereton	Baron Brereton; 1680–1718	Succeeded by Francis Brereton
