= Smethwick Green =

Hamlet in Cheshire, England

Coordinates: 53°10′9″N 2°17′41″W

Smethwick Green is a hamlet in Cheshire in England. It is located near Congleton. Until 2009 it formed part of the Brereton Ward of Congleton district but, on the creation Cheshire East unitary authority area, it became part of the Congleton Rural Ward.

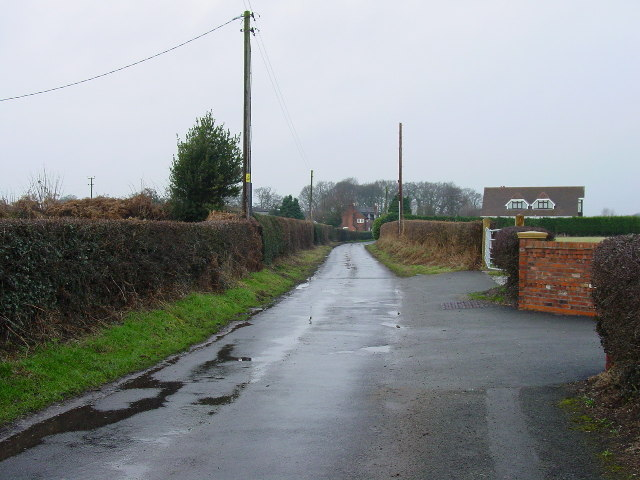
Smethwick Green in January 2006
