= Brereton Hall =

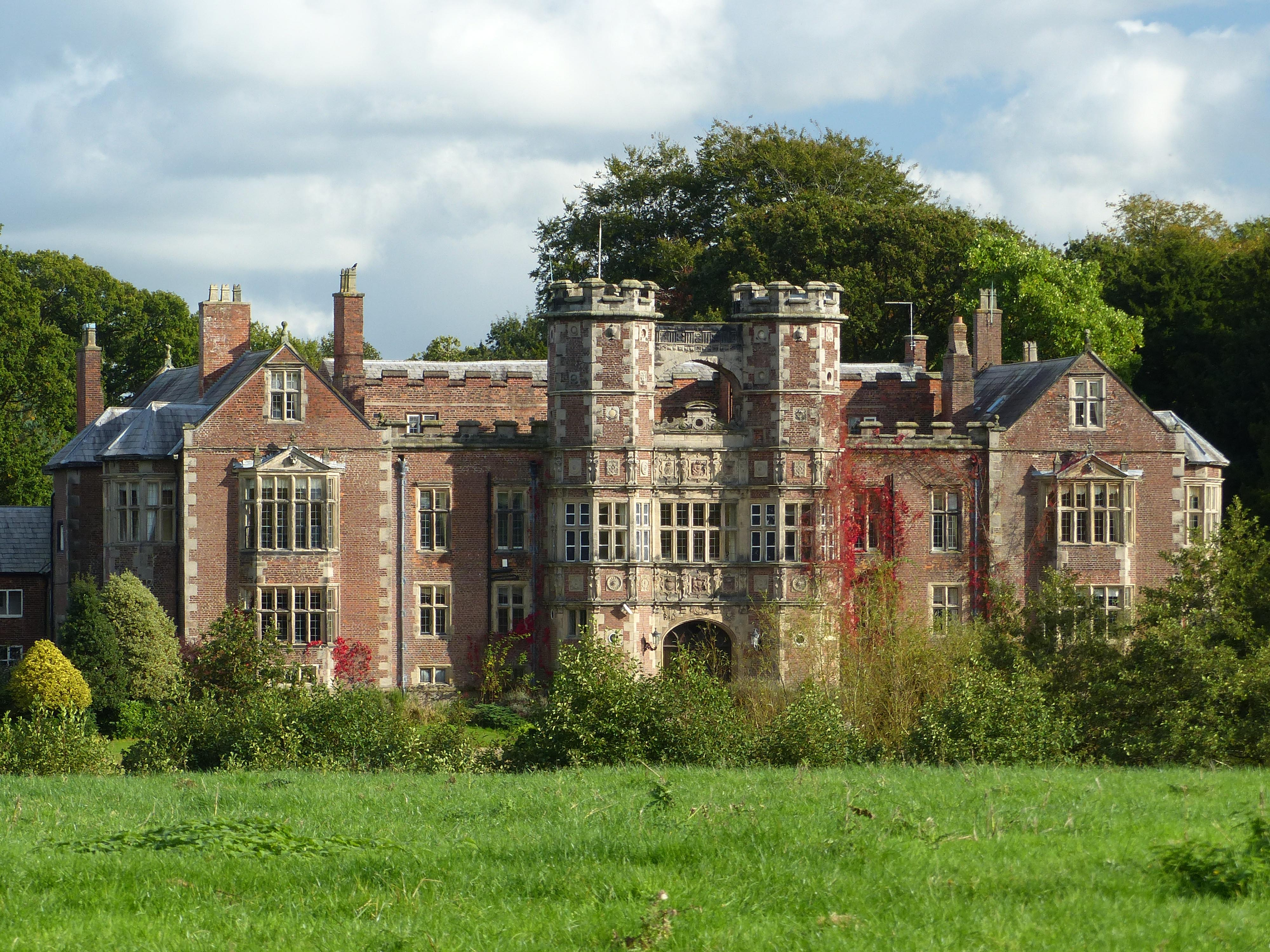
- Brereton Hall

- Location within Cheshire
- 53.1805°N 2.3288°W
- Type: Prodigy house
- Location: Brereton Green, Brereton, Cheshire, England

History
- Built: 1586
- Built for: Sir William Brereton

Site notes
- Architectural style: Elizabethan
- Restored: 1829
- Restored by: John Howard

Listed Building – Grade I
- Official name: Brereton Hall
- Designated: 6 June 1952
- Reference no.: 1229329

Brereton Hall is an Elizabethan prodigy house north of Brereton Green, next to St Oswald's Church in the civil parish of Brereton, Cheshire, England. It is recorded in the National Heritage List for England as a designated Grade I listed building. Brereton is not open to the public.

== History ==
=== Early history ===
The manor of "Bretune" is listed in Domesday Book, held by the Baron of Kinderton, Gilbert Venables. The name "Brereton" itself comes from the Old English for an "enclosure among the briars".

=== The Breretons ===
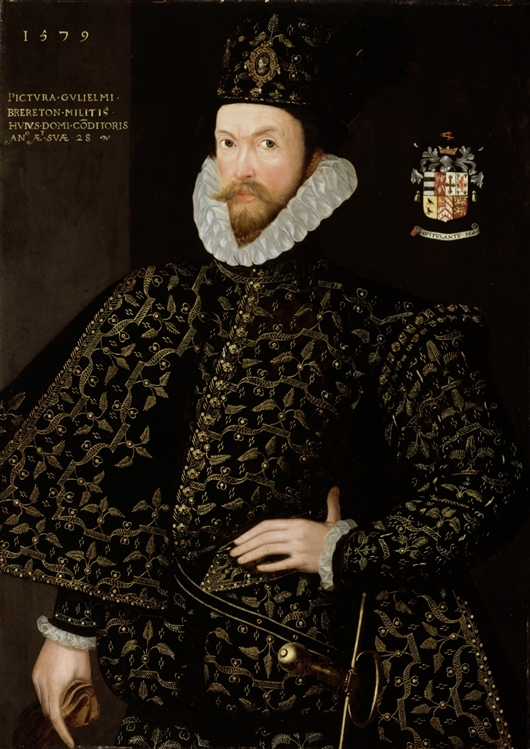
Sir William Brereton, who built the house in 1586

Sir William Brereton (1550–1631) built the house in 1586, with this date appearing over the entrance. Although the architect is unknown, Sir William modelled the house entirely on Rocksavage – the country home of his guardian Sir John Savage, and Savage's daughter, Margaret – whom Brereton would later marry. A portrait of Sir William, dated 1579, with a cameo of Queen Elizabeth in his cap, is at the Detroit Institute of Arts. Sir Wiliam was created Baron Brereton of Leighlin, Co. Carlow, in 1624.

Sir William's grandson, William, 3rd Baron Brereton (1631–1679) became an original Fellow of the Royal Society on 22 April 1663 and was described by Samuel Pepys. His younger son, Francis, 5th Baron Brereton, died a bachelor in 1722, ending the Brereton family male line.

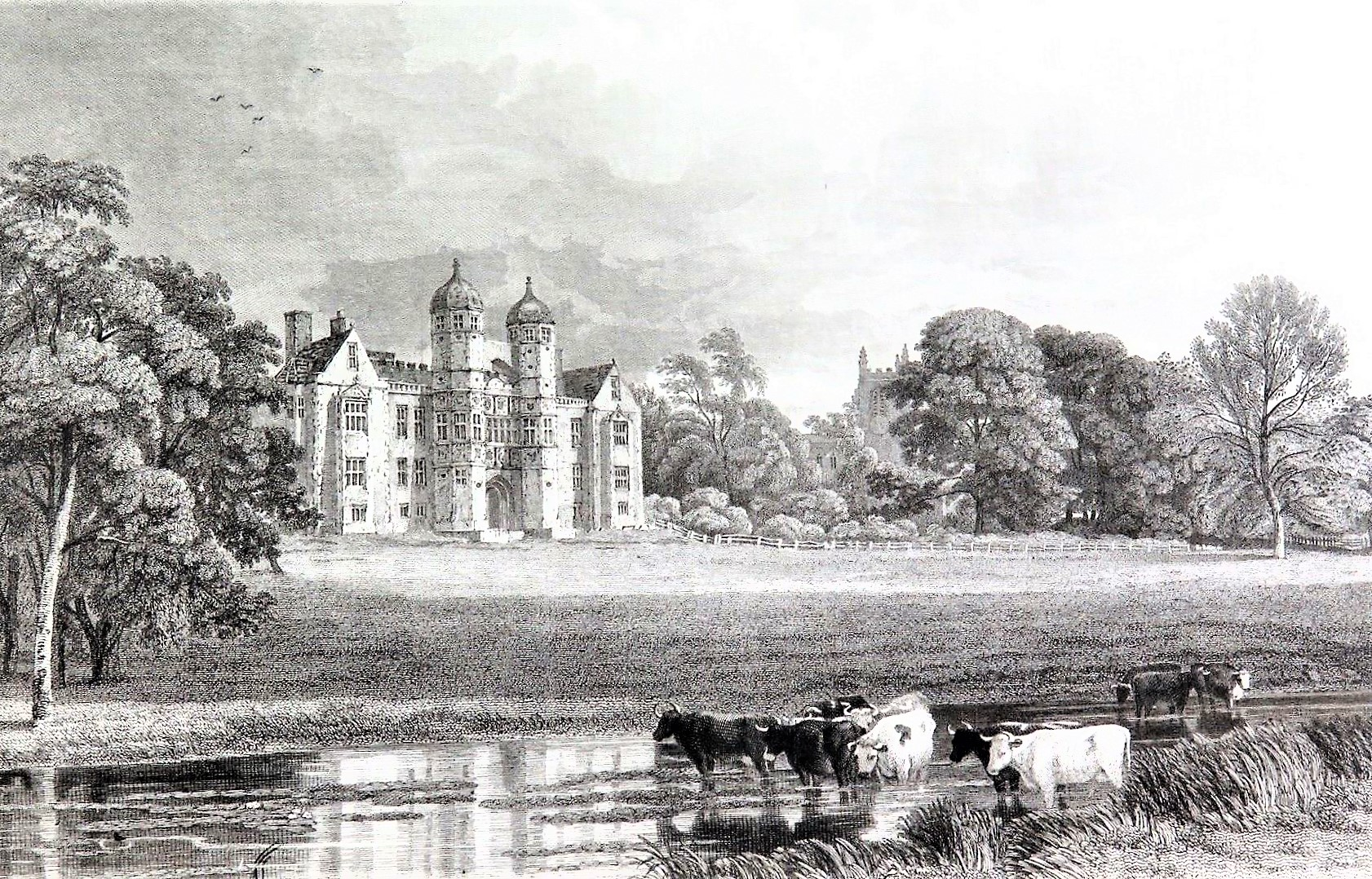
Brereton in 1818, perhaps published to popularise the house for the sale

=== The Holtes and the Bracebridges ===
Brereton was passed to the Holte family of Aston Hall when Jane Brereton married Sir Robert Holte. This placed their surviving child Sir Charles Holte as heir to the estates of both Brereton and Aston. After his death, Brereton was given to Heneage Legge, who let it to the husband of Sir Charles' daughter, Abraham Bracebridge. Bracebridge would later own Brereton when it was bequeathed to him by Legge, upon the latter's death.

=== 1817 sale ===
Brereton was put up for sale in 1817, with an advertisement placed in The Times. An Act of Parliament stated that Bracebridge's estates of both Brereton and Aston were to be sold. It is thought that Brereton was scheduled to be auctioned, although this fell through. The lawyer himself lived at the house for a period of time. Records of this that survive are scarce and uncertain.

=== The Howards ===
John Howard purchased Brereton. The actual date of Howard's purchase is debated, although Goodwin-Brereton writes in 2020 that this occurred in 1830 (or perhaps 1829), and not 1817 as initially thought.

As Brereton had been neglected and unused since 1817, it was then in "a state of disrepair". Howard restored the house and carried out a variety of alterations; namely replacing the twin cupolas at the facade with twin battlements, influenced by the Regency Gothic style, popularized by Strawberry Hill in Twickenham. The interiors of Brereton were also redecorated in this manner.

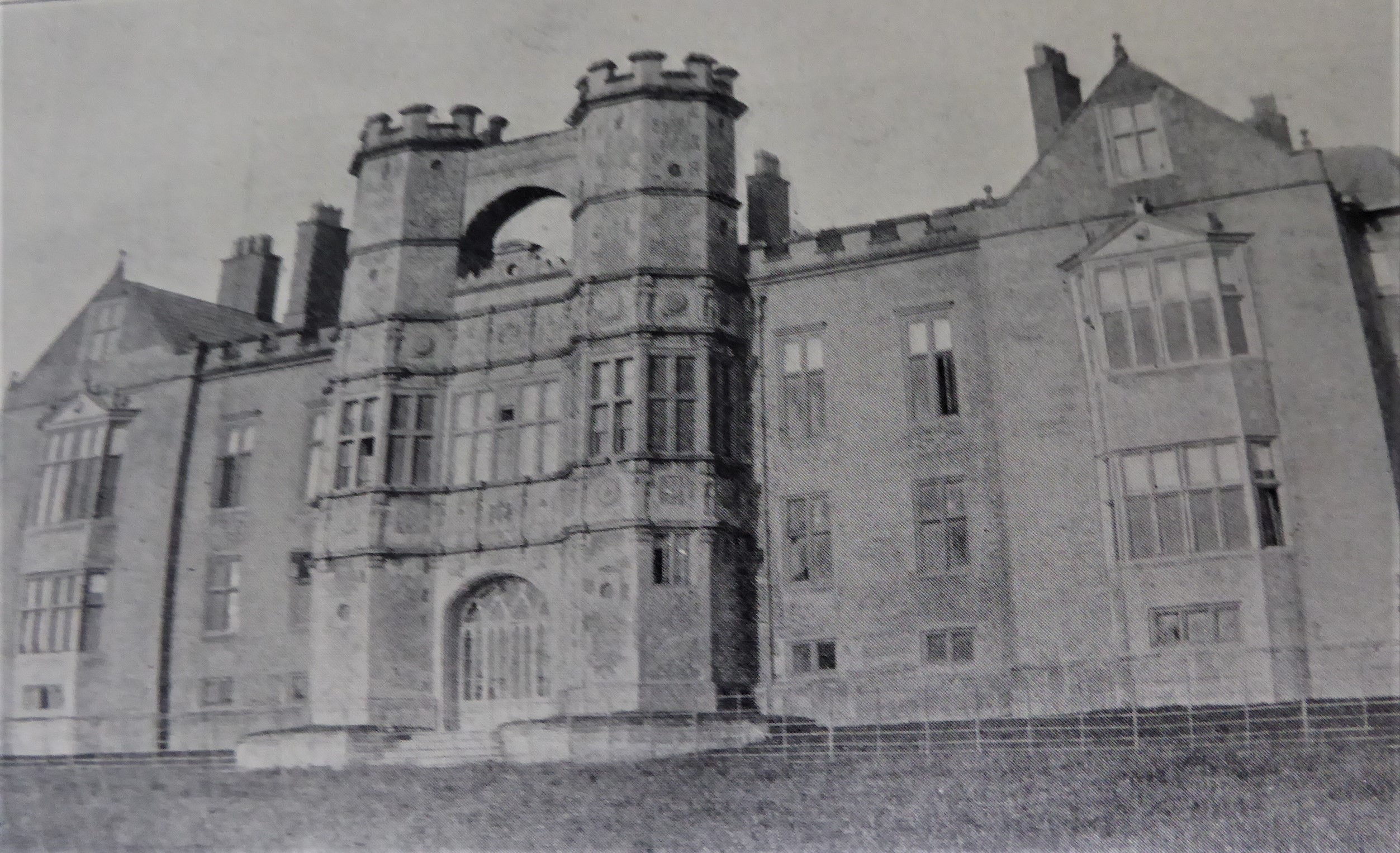
Brereton in c.1895, during the lease to the Moirs

John Howard was the first owner of Brereton to not have direct aristocratic or gentry family heritage, making their fortune entirely through industrial means in nearby Manchester. After John Howard's death in 1861, his widow lived at the house until 1889. In 1891, Mrs Howard let Brereton to the Moirs for nearly three decades, before it was returned to John Brereton-Howard, the young grandson of the late John Howard, in 1911.

The house had once again declined into a state of disrepair. Brereton-Howard would later be killed in the First World War. The house was passed to a relative named Norman McLean, and in turn to a cousin, Garnet Botfield-Winder.

=== Brereton School ===
Mrs M. Massey evacuated a group of children to Brereton during the Second World War to escape the bombings in Manchester. A school was begun, and would remain at Brereton for nearly half of a century. Mrs M. Fletcher would later purchase the house from Mrs Botfield-Winder, and in doing so, formally create the Brereton Hall Private School for Girls. Mrs Fletcher later wrote about Brereton's "graceful surroundings". The school closed in 1994 as it was impossible to renovate and update the Grade I listed building without large restoration costs.

=== Present day ===
Brereton later became the retreat of a pop star who built a recording studio at the back. Andy Wood purchased Brereton in 2000, and had since been a family home, changing hands several times over the last two decades. Planning permission for a hotel was rejected in 2017, and Brereton Hall has since come up for sale a number of times. Brereton is no longer open to the public.

== Architecture ==
The entry for the Grade I listing by Historic England reads:

1585 altered 1829 and late C19. Stone-dressed brick; leaded roof to front range, slate roofs to cross-wings. The present building suggests a reversed E plan, probably with a great hall behind the gateway forming the central bar, demolished and replaced by an 1829 conservatory.

Brereton was modelled on Rocksavage – the country seat of the Savage family – and is one of a genre of splendid Elizabethan and Jacobean houses built for dynastic display called "prodigy houses". It is built in brick with stone dressings, formerly in a E-plan, of which the central wing has been demolished and replaced with a 19th-century conservatory. The front range has a lead roof; the cross-wings are roofed in slate. The front range has a basement and two storeys with a turreted central gateway. The octagonal turrets are linked by a bridge and are embattled. Before 1829, they were surmounted by cupolas.

Over the entrance are the royal arms of Elizabeth I in a panel, which are flanked by the Tudor rose and the Beaufort portcullis. Beyond the entrance is a lower hall and a grand staircase leading to a long gallery which runs along the front of the house. This leads to the drawing room which contains a frieze with nearly 50 coats of arms and a chimney piece carved with the Brereton emblem, a muzzled bear. Two fireplaces elsewhere are carved in a Serlian manner. The former study of the 2nd Lord Brereton contains a richly carved alabaster fireplace.

Marcus Binney wrote that the house "appears to be just the entrance range of an intended courtyard house with four grand fronts." Nikolaus Pevsner wrote that Brereton is "not easily forgotten".

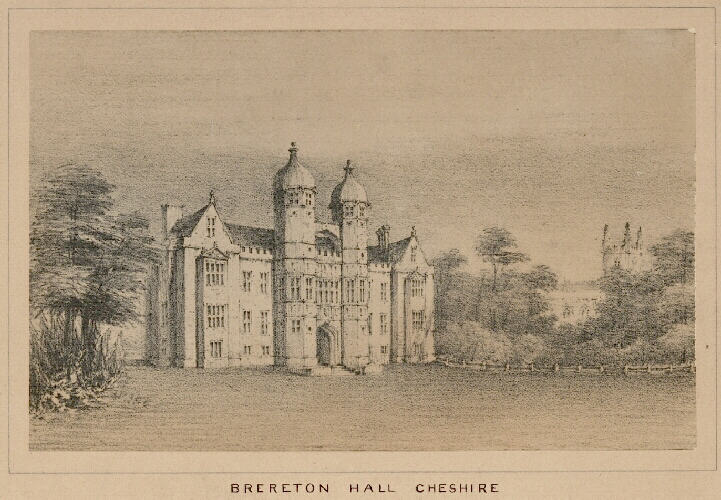
Brereton before 1829, showing the cupolas, which were later replaced by battlements

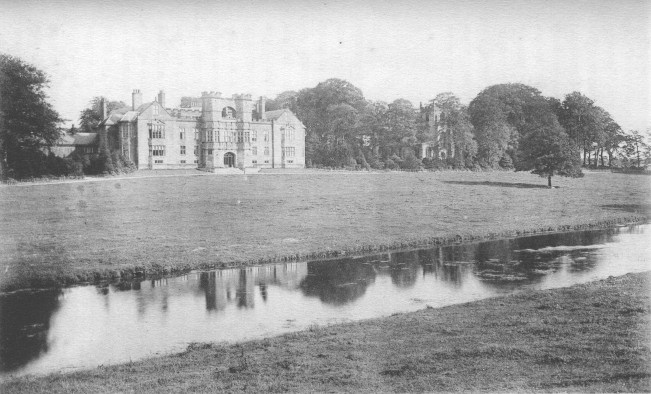
Brereton after 1829, showing the battlements which replaced the prior cupolas

== Grounds ==
=== The River Croco ===
The River Croco runs through the grounds at Brereton. "Croco" is most probably a Celtic term, although its meaning remains unknown. The Croco was first recorded in the same year that the house was built. The Croco later flows into the River Weaver, which by coincidence, runs past the ruins of Rocksavage. Goodwin-Brereton writes that the Croco was "artificially broadened [in front of the house] for effect".

=== Elizabethan and Victorian landscaping ===
There is little surviving evidence of an original Elizabethan garden landscape. Although, given the history of the house and the family, it is likely that a formal garden of the sort once existed. Later Victorian forms of planting landscape remain, although the majority was changed during the period in which the house and grounds were a school.

== Traditions ==
=== Queen Elizabeth I ===
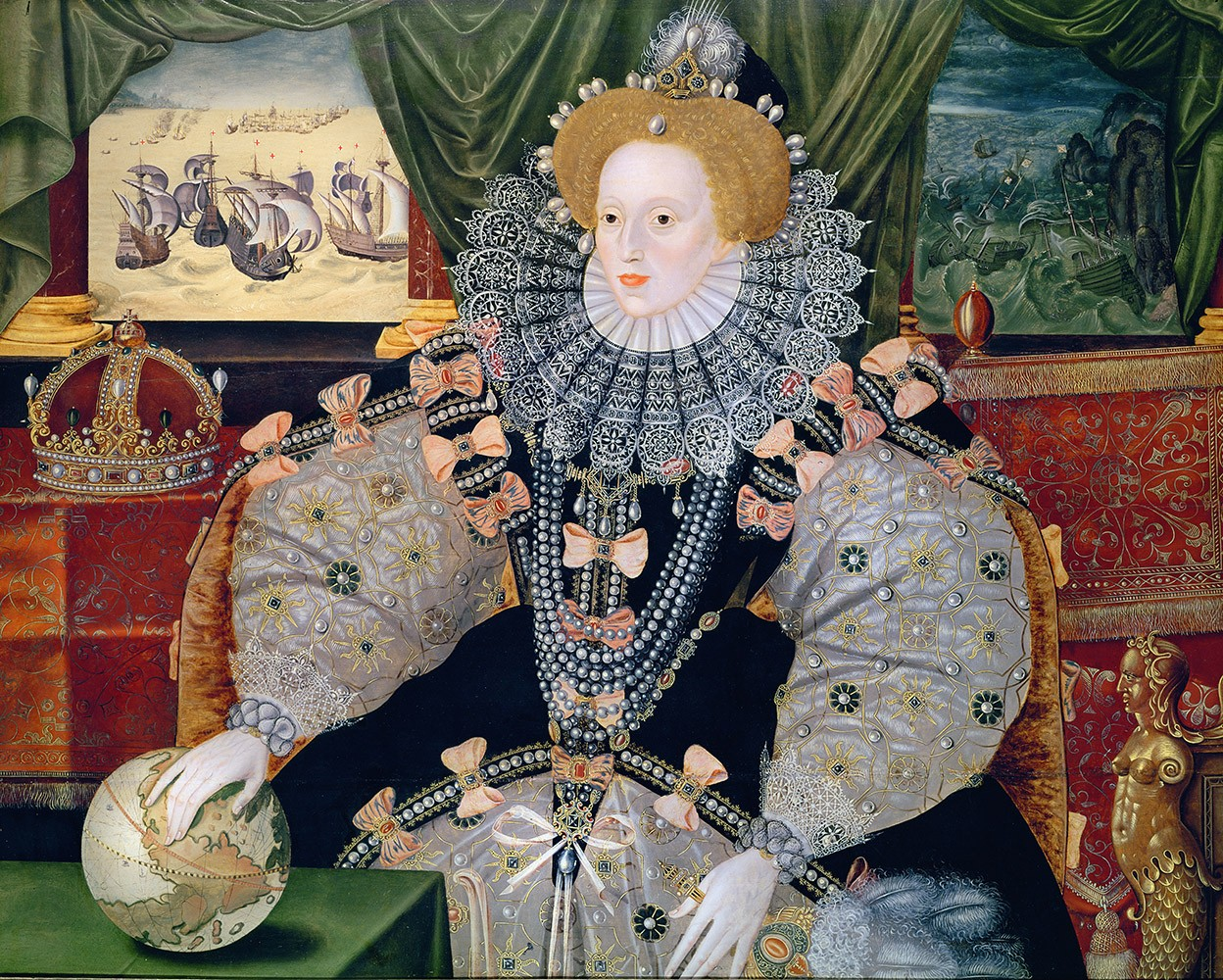
Queen Elizabeth I is rumoured to have made a royal visit to Brereton.

George Ormerod wrote of a tradition that Queen Elizabeth I made a royal visit to Brereton. The house originally had an E-plan before the Howards' restoration, and the royal arms of Elizabeth I can be seen in the central panel, which hint towards the story being genuine. Goodwin-Brereton writes of a further tradition that Elizabeth I "presented her fan to the Breretons as a memento of the visit." Sir William then supposedly built it into the wall of the room in which the queen had slept. The symbol of a fan can be seen throughout the house.

There is, however, documented evidence to prove that Elizabeth I was in London at the time of her supposed visit.

=== The Brereton Lake ===
Michael Drayton and Sir Phillip Sidney wrote of a tradition involving the Brereton Lake, also known as "Bagmere". It was written that before an heir (or "lord") of the Brereton family were to die, a paranormal event would occur, in which the lake would turn to blood and strange reflections would appear. Sidney wrote that the "dead loges [of trees] upsends, from hideous depth", forming a "sore signe" that the "lord [of Brereton's] last thread is spun". The event would cease after the death of the Brereton heir. The story became famous, appearing and being popularized in the works of Michael Drayton and Sir Phillip Sidney.

=== The Brereton Bear ===
Brereton is reputedly "haunted" by a number of ghosts, most famously the "muzzled bear" that supposedly roams the grounds at Brereton. This involves the local story in which William Brereton killed his valet in a temper, his punishment being to fight a bear. Brereton was given three days to weave a muzzle to contain the animal, which proved to be successful and saved his life. The symbol of the muzzled bear can be seen throughout the house, as well as in a window in the nearby St. Oswald's Church, and forms part of the Brereton family's coat of arms. The ghost story may have been created and circulated by the pupils at Brereton School.

== In literature ==
=== The Poly-Olbion ===
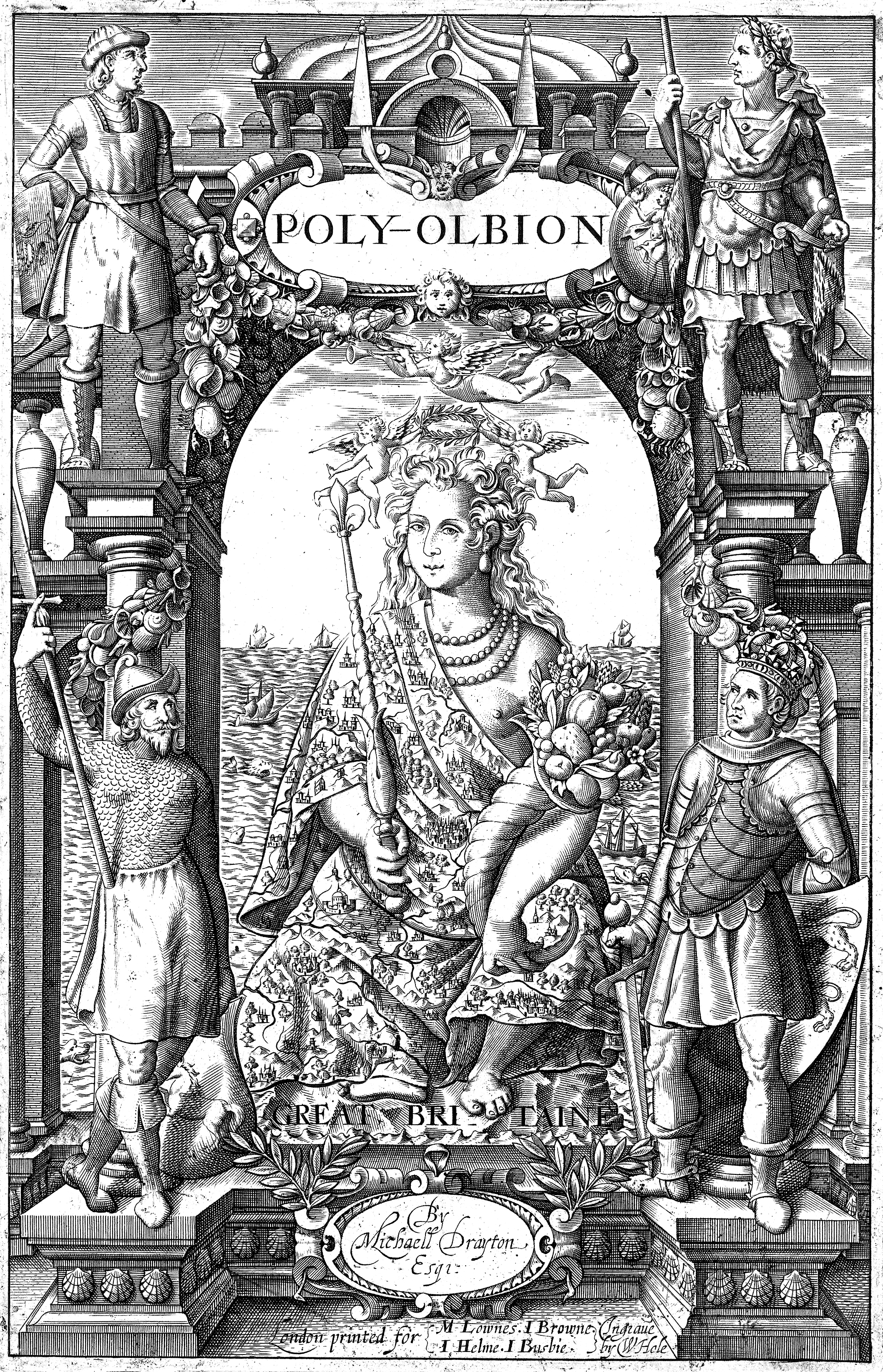
Drayton's "Poly-Olbion", 1612

Brereton appears in Drayton's Poly-Olbion, inspired by the traditions around the Brereton Lake. The Poly-Olbion is a 1612 topographical poem that totals 15,000 lines of verse, written entirely in alexandrine couplets. In the work, Drayton described the lake as a "black, omnious mere", that "sends up stocks of trees, that on the top do float, by which the world her first did for a wonder note."

=== The Seven Wonders of England ===
Brereton appears in Sir Phillip Sidney's Seven Wonders of England – another topographical poem – on the same topic of the lake. Stanza II reads:

The Bruertons have a lake, which, when the sunne
Approching warmes, not else, dead loges up sends
From hideous depth; which tribute, when it ends,
Sore signe it is the lord's last thred is spun.
My lake is Sense, where still streames never runne
But when my sunne her shining twinnes there bends;
Then from his depth with force in her begunne,
Long-drowned hopes to watrie eyes it lends;
But when that failes my dead hopes up to take,
Their master is faire warn'd his will to make.

=== Bracebridge Hall ===
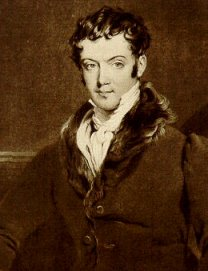
Washington Irving, the author of Bracebridge Hall

It is thought that Brereton also inspired Washington Irving's 1821 Bracebridge Hall. Although it is widely accepted that Aston Hall in Birmingham was the inspiration for the novel, Aston and Brereton were, at one time, both owned by Abraham Bracebridge – who inspired the novel's title. It is thought that Irving was additionally inspired by Brereton, although he never visited.

=== Wolf Hall ===
"William Brereton" appears as a character in Hilary Mantel's 2009 novel Wolf Hall. This refers not to the Sir William Brereton (1550–1631) who built the house, but an earlier relative of the same name, William Brereton (1487–1536), who first established the link with the Savage family, and later Rocksavage.

The earlier William Brereton served as Groom of the Privy Chamber to King Henry VIII, and along with George Boleyn, Viscount Rochford, Sir Henry Norris, Sir Francis Weston and a musician, Mark Smeaton, was tried for treason and adultery with Anne Boleyn, the king's second wife. Brereton was beheaded at Tower Hill on 17 May 1536, although many historians are now of the opinion that Anne Boleyn, Brereton and their co-accused were innocent. Brereton was played by Alastair Mackenzie in the 2015 TV adaptation of the novel.

== See also ==
- Grade I listed buildings in Cheshire East
- Listed buildings in Brereton, Cheshire
