= Baron Brereton =

Title of Nobility in Ireland (1624 - 1722)

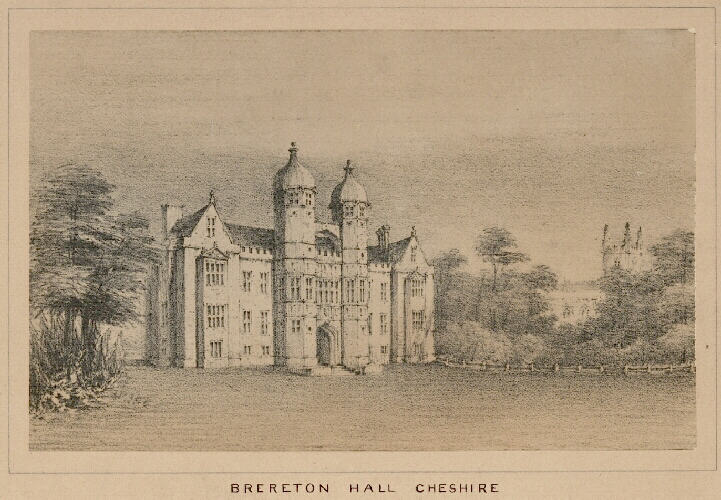
Brereton Hall, the seat of the Brereton family.

Baron Brereton, of Leighlin in the County of Carlow, was a title in the Peerage of Ireland. It was created on 11 May 1624 for Sir William Brereton, of Brereton, Cheshire.

William Brereton was from an old and distinguished family in Cheshire, and the family seat was Brereton Hall in Cheshire, however Brereton had an estate near Old Leighlin, for which he and his heirs were absentee landlords.

The first Lord Brereton was succeeded by his grandson, the second Lord Brereton. He was the son of Sir John Brereton (1591–1629), fourth son of the first Baron. He sat as Member of Parliament for Cheshire. His son, the third Baron, was one of the founders of the Royal Society. Two of his sons, the fourth and fifth Barons, succeeded in the title. It became extinct on the latter's death without issue in 1722. The estates passed to the Holte family, descended from the second Baron's sister.

== Barons Brereton (1624) ==
- William Brereton, 1st Baron Brereton (1550–1631)
- William Brereton, 2nd Baron Brereton (1611–1664)
- William Brereton, 3rd Baron Brereton (1631–1680)
- John Brereton, 4th Baron Brereton (1659–1718)
- Francis Brereton, 5th Baron Brereton (1662–1722)
