= William Brereton, 3rd Baron Brereton =

English mathematician and politician

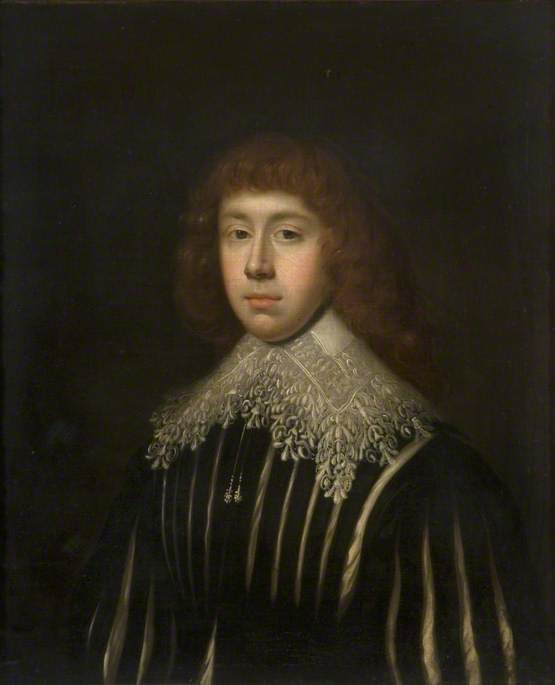
Image of William Brereton

William Brereton, 3rd Baron Brereton FRS (4 May 1631 – 17 March 1680) was an English mathematician and politician who sat in the House of Commons in 1659 and became Baron Brereton in the Irish peerage in 1664. He was chairman of the Committee of Accounts, better known as the Brooke House Committee, in 1667–1670. In that capacity he clashed repeatedly with Samuel Pepys, whose description of Brereton in his Second Diary, or Brooke House Journal, although no doubt biased, is the best portrait we have of the man.

== Early career ==
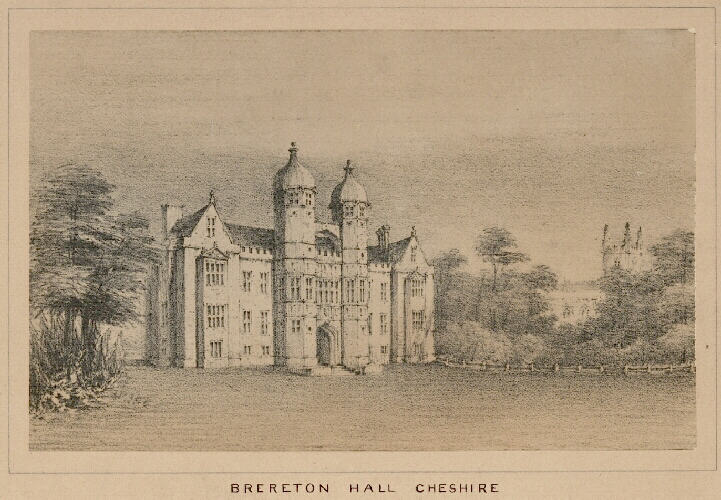
Brereton Hall, the seat of the Brereton family.

Brereton was the eldest son of William Brereton, 2nd Baron Brereton of Brereton Hall, near Chester and his wife Lady Elizabeth Goring, daughter of George Goring, 1st Earl of Norwich and Mary Neville. He studied mathematics and Greek at the Orange College of Breda, where he was tutored by John Pell.

In 1659, Brereton was elected Member of Parliament for Newton in the Third Protectorate Parliament and for Bossiney in 1660. By his own account he was a man utterly without influence at Court.

Brereton became an original Fellow of the Royal Society on 22 April 1663. He inherited the Irish peerage Baron Brereton on the death of his father in 1664. In 1668 he gave the rectory of Tilston, near Malpas to the mathematician Thomas Branker.

== Brooke House Committee ==
Brereton briefly became a figure of national importance as Chairman of the Brooke House Committee, properly called the Committee of Accounts, set up by the House of Commons to inquire into the failures of the Navy during the Second Anglo-Dutch War. By his own admission he was chosen because his lack of influence at Court, which in the climate of the times was seen as a sign of his independence. He faced a formidable opponent in Samuel Pepys, who defended the record of the Navy Office with great eloquence. Pepys was noted for the accuracy of his reporting, so his description of the frequent hot-tempered exchanges between them is probably accurate enough. When Brereton angrily denounced Pepys for questioning the Committee's reading of the Statute empowering them to act, Pepys replied that any Englishman may read and form his own interpretation of a public statute. When Brereton sarcastically asked if Pepys would defy the whole world, Pepys replied that he would "defy the whole world and Lord Brereton in particular". Brereton was hampered by the fact that King Charles II and his brother James, Duke of York, were present for most of the hearings and made their support for Pepys evident. James on one occasion rebuked Brereton for improper language, and when Brereton produced what he described as written proof that Pepys had taken a bribe, the King asked drily if anyone could believe that Pepys would stoop to take such a paltry sum. When the committee was dissolved, having produced no lasting results, Brereton effectively retired from public life.

== Family ==
Brereton married Frances, daughter and co-heiress of Francis Willoughby, 5th Baron Willoughby of Parham and his wife Elizabeth Cecil (who has great-granddaughter of William Cecil, 1st Baron Burghley. He died in 1680, aged only 48, and was succeeded by his sons John and Francis; on the death of Francis in 1722 the title became extinct.

Parliament of England
Vacant Not represented in previous Parliaments	Member of Parliament for Newton; 1659; With: Peter Legh	Vacant Not represented in restored Rump
Peerage of Ireland
Preceded by William Brereton	Baron Brereton; 1664–1680	Succeeded by John Brereton
