= Listed buildings in Newbold Astbury =

Newbold Astbury (also known as Astbury) is a civil parish in Cheshire East, England. It contains 25 buildings that are recorded in the National Heritage List for England as designated listed buildings. Of these, one is listed at Grade I, the highest grade, three are listed at Grade II*, the middle grade, and the others are at Grade II. The major settlement in the parish is the village of Astbury; its listed buildings include the church and associated structures, houses and cottages, and a telephone kiosk. The Macclesfield Canal runs through the parish, and there are five listed buildings associated with this, three bridges, an aqueduct, and a milestone. Otherwise the parish is rural, and the listed buildings are farmhouses, farm buildings, and a boundary stone.

== Key ==
Grade	Criteria
I	Buildings of exceptional interest, sometimes considered to be internationally important
II*	Particularly important buildings of more than special interest
II	Buildings of national importance and special interest

== Buildings ==
Name and location	Photograph	Date	Notes	Grade
St Mary's Church; 53.15074°N 2.23144°W		12th century	The church contains a round-arched doorway, but most of the fabric dates from a major rebuilding in the 15th century. It architectural style is Gothic, mainly Perpendicular. There were two restorations, one by Anthony Salvin, and a later one by George Gilbert Scott. The church is built in sandstone, and it has a metal roof. Its plan is that of a trapezoid, consisting of a nave with a clerestory, a chancel, aisles, and chapels, which are all in one cell. There are also west and south porches, and a steeple at the northwest joined to the church by a passage.	I
Canopied tomb 53.15105°N 2.23114°W		13th century	The tomb was originally in St Mary's Church, and has been moved into the churchyard. It is in sandstone. The tomb has a moulded plinth and top, on which lie two weathered effigies. The canopy is arched and contains crocketed pinnacles. The tomb is also a scheduled monument.	II*
Tomb (south); 53.15103°N 2.23115°W		Medieval	The tomb is in sandstone, and consists of a raised plinth carrying a weathered recumbent effigy. The effigy is in armour, holding a shield, and with feet resting on a beast. A leg is missing.	II
Tomb (north); 53.15106°N 2.23113°W		Medieval	The tomb is in sandstone, and consists of an effigy on a slab. It is badly weathered, but appears to be a male wearing a cassock with a cowled collar. The hands are held together in prayer.	II
Cross base and shaft 53.15074°N 2.23144°W		16th century	The cross base and shaft are in the churchyard of St Mary's Church; it was converted into a sundial in the 18th century. The base consists of two octagonal steps on which stands an octagonal pillar with a moulded capital. On top of this is an inscribed copper plate without a gnomon. The cross is also a scheduled monument.	II
Glebe Farmhouse; 53.15038°N 2.23074°W		16th century	Originating as a rectory, and later used as a farmhouse, the building was extended and altered in the 18th and 19th centuries. The older part is timber-framed, and largely encased in brick, the later parts are in brick, and the roof is slated. The house is in two storeys with an attic. The older portion on the left consists of a slightly projecting gabled wing with a porch and sash windows. To the left of this are two lean-to extensions. To the right is a two-bay wing with stone quoins, a mix of sash and casement windows, and two gabled dormers.	II*
Brook Farmhouse; 53.14371°N 2.23664°W	—	Early 17th century	A timber-framed farmhouse on a stone plinth with rendered infill and a tiled roof. The sides of the building are pebbledashed. The farmhouse is in two storeys and has a projecting wing to the right with a decorative gable. The range to the left is also gabled, and contains a door and a gabled porch. The windows are casements. Inside the farmhouse is an inglenook.	II
Styeheath Cottages; 53.15020°N 2.22753°W	—	Early 17th century	The building was later extended, and has been converted from two cottages to a single house. The older part is timber-framed with rendered infill, and the later part, to the left, is brick painted to simulate timber-framing. The roof is of cement tiles. The windows are casements, and there are three gabled dormers. Inside the house is an inglenook.	II
Barn, Lockett's Tenement Farm; 53.13836°N 2.20790°W	—	17th century	A brick barn with stone dressings and a tiled roof, that incorporates earlier material in the form of crucks. It is in a single storey. There are six doorways, two of which are blocked, ventilation holes in different patterns, and three gabled dormers containing circular holes.	II
Black and White Cottages; 53.15079°N 2.23222°W		17th century	A pair of cottages that are mainly timber-framed with brick infill and with tiled roofs. They are in two storeys, have two doors at the front, and casement windows. The left gable end and the oushuts at the rear are in brick.	II
Churchyard gateway 53.15091°N 2.23199°W		17th century	The gateway to the entrance of the churchyard of St Mary's Church is in sandstone. There is a central round-headed archway with a hood mould, above which is a battlemented parapet with crocketed pinnacles. Also above the arch is an inscribed stone.	II
Ciss Green Farmhouse; 53.14098°N 2.22927°W	—	17th century	The farmhouse was considerably extended in the 19th century. The earlier part is timber-framed with wattle and daub infill, and the later parts are in brick. The roof is slated, and the farmhouse is in two storeys. Facing the farmyard is a front of two gables, the right portion dating from the 19th century. The timber-framing in the lower storey of the left portion has been replaced in brick, and the upper floor is slightly jettied. The windows are casements, and inside the farmhouse is an inglenook.	II
Greenbank; 53.15088°N 2.23248°W		Early 18th century	A brick house, used as a post office, with stone dressings and a tiled roof, it is in two storeys with an attic, and has a front of four bays. There is a central doorway with a stone surround. To the right is a bowed oriel window, and to the left a three-light window. The windows in the upper floor are sashes, and in the attic they are casements. In the roof is a skylight.	II
Brownlow Cottages; 53.14697°N 2.25022°W	—	Mid-18th century	Originating as a farmhouse, this has been converted into two cottages. They are built in brick with stone dressings and a tiled roof. The building is in two storeys with a basement, and has a symmetrical front of two bays. The windows are casements. To the rear is a two-storey two-bay gabled wing.	II
Boundary stone 53.16294°N 2.25145°W	—	18th century	The stone marls the boundary between the parishes on Newbold Astbury and Somerford. It is in sandstone and is rectangular in plan. On one side is an incised arrow, on another is an Ordnance Survey benchmark, and on the top is a cross.	II
Astbury Rectory; 53.15199°N 2.22993°W	—	1757–59	The rectory was probably designed by William Baker. It is built in brick with stone dressings and has a slate roof. The house is in two storeys with an attic and a basement, and has a symmetrical five-bay front. There is a curing wing to the left and the remains of a similar one to the right. The central three bays project forward and are surmounted by a dentilled cornice and a pediment with ball finials. The windows are sashes.	II*
Royal Oak Cottage; 53.15143°N 2.23297°W		Mid- to late 18th century	A brick house with a tiled roof. It consists of a central block flanked by lower wings, and is in two storeys. It has a gabled timber porch and casement windows, those in the upper storey of the wings being in gables.	II
3 The Green; 53.15084°N 2.23236°W		Early 19th century	A brick house with a tiled roof, in two storeys, with a three-bay front. On the ground floor is a doorway with a gabled porch on the right and a round-arched alley entry to the left. The windows are sashes.	II
Aqueduct; 53.13914°N 2.22065°W		c. 1827	The aqueduct carries the Macclesfield Canal, the engineer for which was William Crosley, over Watery Lane. It is in sandstone and consists of a single arch with voussoirs and keystones. There are slightly curving wing walls that end in square piers.	II
Bridge No. 79; 53.14850°N 2.21334°W		c. 1827	The bridge carries Peel Lane over the Macclesfield Canal, the engineer for which was William Crosley. It is in sandstone and consists of a single horseshoe arch with voussoirs and keystones. There are slightly curving wing walls that end in square piers.	II
Bridge No. 80; 53.14399°N 2.21583°W		c. 1827	The bridge carries Dodd's Lane over the Macclesfield Canal, the engineer for which was William Crosley. It is in sandstone and consists of a single horseshoe arch with voussoirs and keystones. There are slightly curving wing walls that end in square piers.	II
Bridge No. 81; 53.13577°N 2.22462°W		c. 1827	The bridge carries Oak Lane over the Macclesfield Canal, the engineer for which was William Crosley. It is in sandstone and consists of a single horseshoe arch with voussoirs and keystones. There are slightly curving wing walls that end in square piers.	II
Canal milestone 53.13906°N 2.22091°W	—	c. 1830	The milestone in alongside the tow-path of the Macclesfield Canal. It is in sandstone, and has a tooled and shaped head. Its faces are inscribed with the distances in miles to Marple and Hall Green.	II
St Mary's Cottage; 53.15106°N 2.22901°W	—	c. 1871	A cottage built in an unusual type of shuttered concrete with a tiled roof. It is in two storeys and has a two-bay front. The left bay contains a doorway flanked by windows with trefoil heads and honeycomb glazing. In the upper storey is a lancet window. The lower floor of the right bay contains a four-light window, and above this is a canted oriel window.	II
Telephone kiosk 53.15129°N 2.23355°W		1935	A K6 type telephone kiosk, designed by Giles Gilbert Scott. Constructed in cast iron with a square plan and a dome, it has three unperforated crowns in the top panels.	II
