= Listed buildings in Smallwood, Cheshire =

Smallwood is a civil parish in Cheshire East, England. It contains nine buildings that are recorded in the National Heritage List for England as designated listed buildings, all of which are listed at Grade II. This grade is the lowest of the three gradings given to listed buildings and is applied to "buildings of national importance and special interest". Apart from the village of Smallwood, the parish is rural. The listed buildings consist of farmhouses, farm buildings, a house, a school, a former Women's Land Army hostel, and a church.

Name and location	Photograph	Date	Notes
Overton Green Farmhouse; 53.14137°N 2.29529°W	—	Late 16th or early 17th century	The farmhouse is partly timber-framed and partly in brick, and has a slate roof. It is in two storeys. The original part forms a gabled wing at the right; both the upper floor and the gable are jettied. To the left are 19th and 20th-century brick extensions, including a lean-to porch and a gabled dormer. The windows are casements. On the right side of the house is a massive brick chimney stack.
Deer's Green Farmhouse; 53.13937°N 2.28250°W	—	16th or 17th century	Basically timber-framed, part of the farmhouse has been encased in brick, and part of it is pebbledashed. The entrance front has a gabled wing on the left, and the windows are casements. Inside the house is some timber framing, and there are two inglenooks.
Barn, Overton Hall Farm; 53.14208°N 2.29532°W	—	16th or 17th century	A timber-framed barn with butt-boarded infill and a stone-slate roof. The gable ends have been replaced in brick, and the front facing the road has been covered in vertical weatherboarding. The barn contains double doors flanked by rectangular pitch holes.
Pinfold Farmhouse; 53.14853°N 2.28238°W	—	16th or 17th century	The former farmhouse was extended in the 19th and 20th centuries. It is in brick with a tiled roof, and has two storeys. Most of the windows are casements, and there are two canted oriel windows. Inside the house is a pair of cruck beams.
Outbuilding, Deer's Green Farm; 53.13906°N 2.28238°W		17th century	The farm building is partly timber-framed and partly in brick on a stone plinth, and has a slate roof. It is in a single storey and contains four doorways.
School and schoolmaster's house 53.13848°N 2.29105°W		c. 1845	The school and house were probably designed by Charles and James Trubshaw. They are built in brick with stone dressings with a tiled roof. The house, facing the road, is in two storeys. To the rear of this is the single-storey school that incorporates a projecting gabled wing containing a five-light window. The windows are mullioned. There are 20th-century extensions at the rear.
St John the Baptist's Church; 53.13819°N 2.29122°W		1845	The church was designed by Charles and James Trubshaw. It is built in sandstone with a slate roof. The church consists of a nave, a chancel, a southwest porch, and a northwest vestry. On the west gable is a bellcote. The windows are lancets, and inside the church is a hammerbeam roof.
Smallwood House; 53.13781°N 2.29098°W		Mid 19th century	Originating as a rectory, the house is built in red brick with blue brick diapering in a diamond pattern, and has a tiled roof. It was probably designed by Charles and James Trubshaw. The house is in two storeys with an attic, and has a three-bay entrance front, the outer bays projecting and gabled. In the central bay is a lean-to porch, and above it is a half-dormer.
Women's Land Army hostel 53.15030°N 2.30500°W	—	1942	The hostel was built to accommodate members of the Women's Land Army, and has subsequently been converted for agricultural use. It is built in brick with hollow-tile block walls, and has asbestos-sheet roofing, steel and timber windows, and concrete floors. The hostel has a single storey and a T-shaped plan, consisting of a dining block, a dormitory and ablutions block at right angles, a small linking block, an outshut, and a boiler-room tower.
