= St Mary's Church, Astbury =

Coordinates: 53.1507°N 2.2314°W

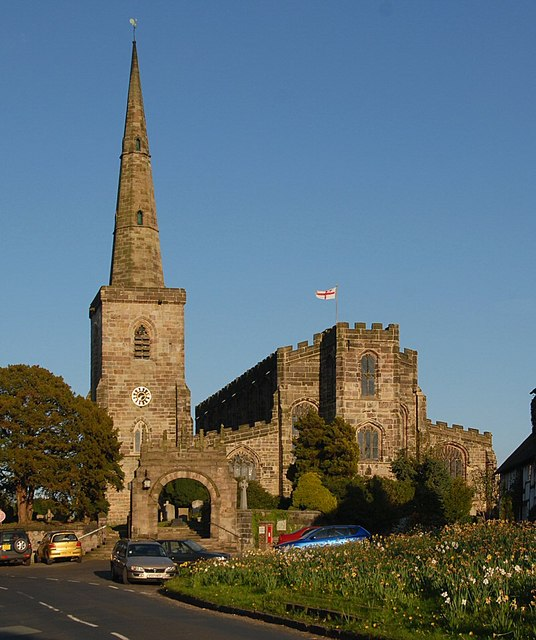
- St Mary's Church, Astbury, from the west

- Location in Cheshire
- OS grid reference: SJ 846,615
- Location: Newbold Astbury, Cheshire
- Country: England
- Denomination: Anglican
- Website: St Mary's Church, Astbury

History
- Status: Parish church

Architecture
- Functional status: Active
- Heritage designation: Grade I
- Designated: 14 February 1967
- Architect(s): Anthony Salvin, George Gilbert Scott (restorations)
- Architectural type: Church
- Style: Gothic

Specifications
- Materials: Tower millstone grit Body of the church yellow sandstone with a metal roof

Administration
- Province: York
- Diocese: Chester
- Archdeaconry: Macclesfield
- Deanery: Congleton
- Parish: Astbury

Clergy
- Rector: vacant

St Mary's Church is an Anglican parish church in the village of Newbold Astbury, Cheshire, England. It is recorded in the National Heritage List for England as a designated Grade I listed building, and its architecture has been praised by a number of writers.

It is possible that a church was present on the site in the Saxon era, although the earliest fabric in the church is Norman. The present ground plan was established in the 13th and 14th centuries, from which time the church's external appearance dates, apart from a major rebuilding in the later part of the 15th century, when the range of high windows or clerestory was added. All styles of English Gothic architecture, are represented in the church: Early English, Decorated, and Perpendicular. During the English Civil War, a group of Roundheads stabled their horses in the church. In the 19th century the interior of the church was restored by George Gilbert Scott; some wall paintings were revealed, and stained glass was added.

The church has a number of special features. These include its exceptionally wide nave for a village church, and its trapezoidal shape. The tower is separate from the body of the church, joined to it by a passage with a porch. There are two other porches: the three-storey west porch and the two-storey south porch. Inside the church are medieval fittings and furniture and many memorials. The churchyard contains numerous gravestones from the 17th century and five listed structures, including a canopied tomb. St Mary's continues to be an active church in the centre of its village. It provides the usual services of an Anglican church and runs a number of organisations catering for children and adults.

== History ==
The origins of the church are unclear. The Domesday survey of 1086 records the presence of a priest at Astbury, but not a church. The discovery nearby of fragments of stone with apparent Saxon decoration, coffin lids, and the lower stages of a cross – all of which might date from before the Norman conquest – suggest that an earlier church may have been on the site. The earliest fabric in the present church is a round-arched doorway. Architectural historian Andor Gomme dates this from about the middle of the 12th century and states that at that time the church would have been a simple rectangular building, and mainly timber-framed.^{[A]} Gomme suggests further that in the middle of the 13th century the east end of the church would have been rebuilt in stone, with a chancel and sanctuary. Subsequently, the rest of the body of the church was built, consisting of the nave and north and south aisles; the work was completed in the 14th century. The tower was built towards the end of the 13th century, not in the usual position at the west end of the church but to the north of the west bay of the north aisle, separated from it by a distance of 6 feet (1.8 m). During the 14th century the south porch, with its priest's room or treasury in the top storey, was added. It is not known whether the tower's spire was built in the 14th or the 15th century.

Major rebuilding work took place in the later part of the 15th century. It is thought that it began with the south arcade, followed by the north arcade and the addition of a clerestory. The rebuilding was probably complete by about 1525, although the north aisle may not have been completely re-roofed until the early 17th century. The west porch was probably started in the 14th century, and the upper two storeys added in the following century. The nave roof was repaired in 1615. During the English Civil War, while nearby Biddulph Hall was under siege, Sir William Brereton's Roundheads stabled their horses in the church. They damaged the medieval glass windows and removed some of the church furniture, including the organ. There have been few significant changes since that time. The church was restored during the 19th century by Anthony Salvin, and later, in about 1857, by George Gilbert Scott, who removed plaster from the walls and built a small gallery. During the Victorian era, the reredos and most of the stained glass were added.

== Architecture ==
=== Exterior ===
The body of the church is constructed in yellow sandstone ashlar, and the tower in millstone grit, an unusual material for churches in Cheshire. The architectural historian Alec Clifton-Taylor draws attention to the crispness of the details of the stonework in the tower 500 years after it was carved, compared to the sandstone, which is prone to weathering. The roof is metal. The church incorporates elements of Norman, Early English, Decorated, and Perpendicular architecture. The overall plan is that of a trapezium; the west end is 8 feet (2.4 m) wider than the east. The body of the church consists of a seven-bay nave and chancel with no structural division, and north and south aisles. The aisles are rectangular, thus the narrowing takes place entirely within the nave and chancel. The west end of the nave, between the piers (columns) of the arcades, is 40 feet (12.2 m) wide. This is exceptionally wide for a parish church, and slightly wider than the nave of Chester Cathedral. The aisles extend along the sides of the chancel, forming north and south chapels. The tower stands to the north of the west bay of the body of the church, and is joined to it by a short passage with a porch on its east side. There are also porches on the west and south sides of the church.

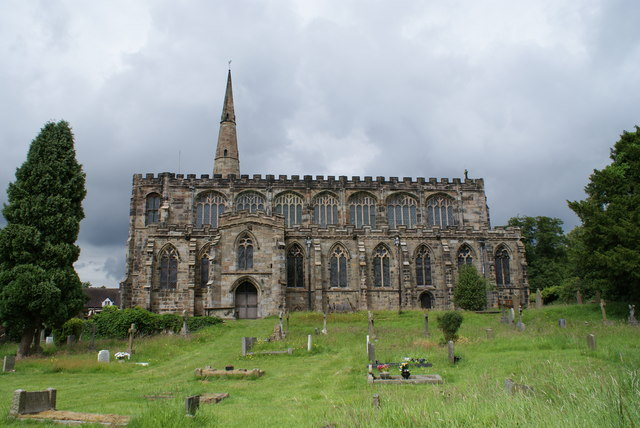
St Mary's Church from the south

The tower is in three stages and is supported by buttresses. In the lowest stage, on the west side, is a doorway in Romanesque style, on the north side is an ogee-headed lancet window. On the left of the east side is a Perpendicular-style porch. The middle stage has a two-light window on the west side, above which is a circular clock face, and on the north and east sides are lancet windows. The top stage contains a two-light louvred bell opening on each side. The parapet is plain, and projecting from it on the west side is a gargoyle. The spire is octagonal, with two tiers of lucarnes (dormer windows). The north side of the church is divided by buttresses into four bays. The second bay from the east contains a priest's door, above which is a lancet window. To the right of the door is a small trefoil-headed window. The other bays contain two-light windows with Early English tracery. Battlemented parapets run around the walls of the aisle walls and the clerestory. The clerestory has seven bays on either side, each containing a four-light Perpendicular window. At the east end are three windows. The central window, at the end of the chancel, is Perpendicular with seven lights. This is flanked by two aisle windows with plate tracery, the one to the right having four lights, and that to the left five lights.

The southern side of the church has nine bays, again divided by buttresses. In the third bay from the west is a porch. The other bays each contain a two-light window with trefoil heads. The porch is in two storeys, with angle buttresses and a battlemented parapet with gargoyles. The lower storey contains a doorway with a pointed arch, and the upper storey has a two-light window. The doorway and window are set slightly to the west of the centre, as the east wall contains a stairway. Inside the porch are stone seats and the remains of two stoups (holy water fonts). The staircase leading to the upper storey is composed of old gravestones. On the outer wall of the upper storey is a sundial. The west end of the church is in Perpendicular style, and has five bays. At its centre is another porch, this one with three storeys. At the west front are diagonal buttresses, and in the bottom storey is a double doorway, over which is a canopied niche containing the weathered image of a saint. In the middle storey is a three-light window, in the top storey a two-light window, and at the summit is a battlemented parapet. There are windows in the north and south faces of the top stage, and on the north side is an octagonal stair turret. Inside the porch are four corbels (supporting brackets) carved with musicians. On each side of the porch is a four-light window. At the west end of the north aisle is a four-light window, and a five-light window is at the end of the south aisle.

=== Interior ===
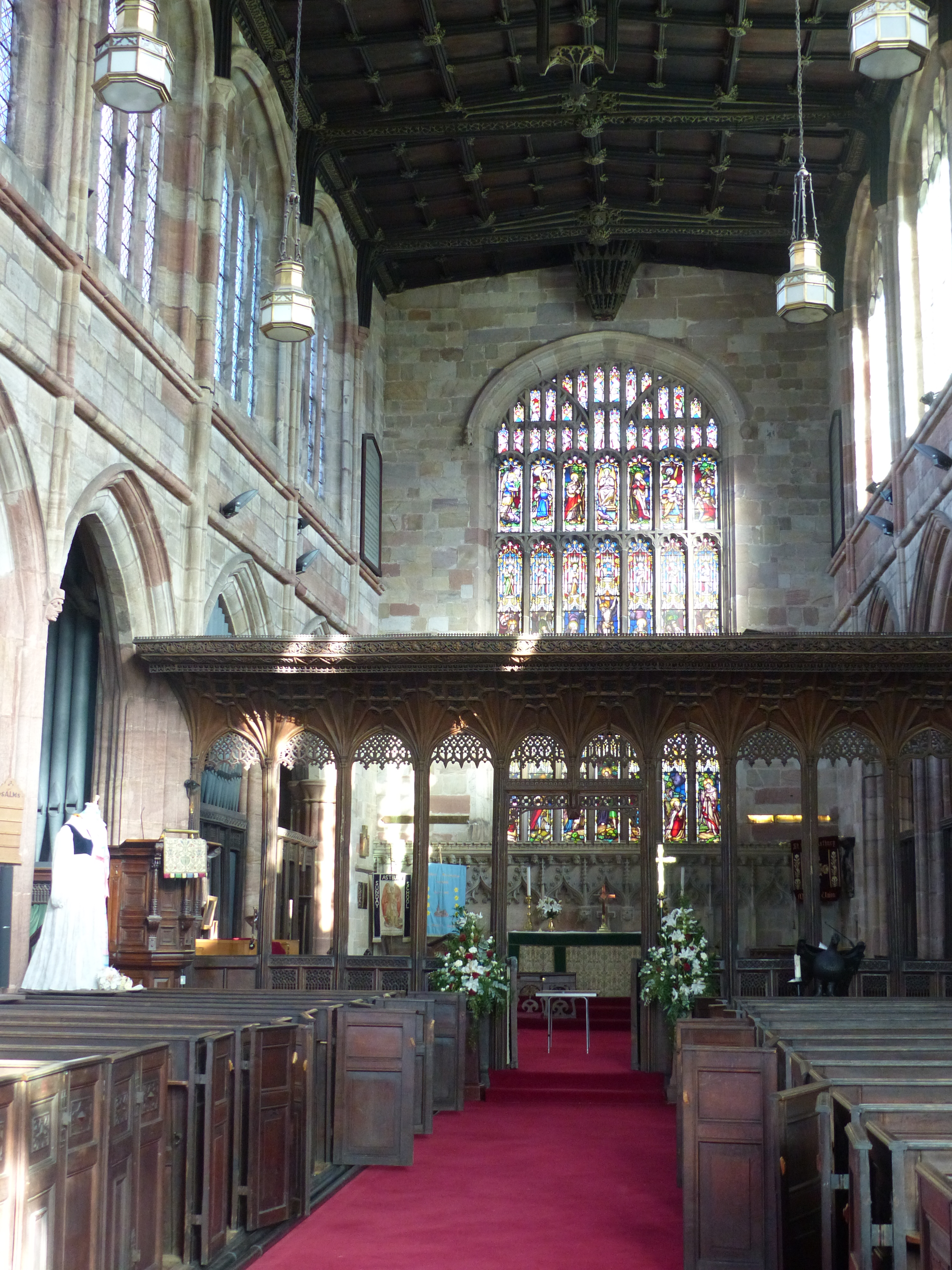
Chancel screen

The nave and chancel are divided from the aisles by seven-bay arcades, the piers being without capitals. At the top of each pier, facing the nave, is a carved human face. The roofs are divided into panels and contain much carving, including bosses (protrusions), shields, inscriptions and three pendants. The chapel at the west end of the south aisle is known as the Lady Chapel, and that on the north side is dedicated to Saint Mary. The church contains more medieval fittings and furniture than any other Cheshire church. Between the nave and the chancel is a screen, and there are parclose screens between the aisles and the chapels. The chancel screen, dated 1500, is elaborately carved with representations of birds, roses, vines and foliage. It has ten bays with lierne vaulting. The chancel stalls and the carved wooden eagle lectern date from around the same period. The lectern is one of the oldest eagle lecterns in the United Kingdom. The stalls have hinged seats, and formerly had misericords (shelves to support a standing person). Much of the furniture dates from the 17th century and is in Jacobean style. This includes the altar rails, the octagonal pulpit, the box pews, the reredos (screen behind the altar) in the Lady Chapel, and the font cover. The font itself is Perpendicular. The reredos in the chancel of 1866 was designed by the Manchester architect J. S. Crowther.

The royal arms of Charles II are in the north aisle. During the 1852 restoration whitewash was removed from the walls, revealing the royal arms of Henry VII, and paintings which include one of The Blessed Virgin knighting St George. Stained glass in the west windows of both aisles dates from around 1500. Other glass comes from the Victorian era. This includes the east window from about 1858, and the window at the east end of the north aisle from about 1861, both by William Warrington, and the east window in the south aisle from about 1872 by Ward and Hughes. The two westernmost windows in the south aisle are by O'Connor and dated 1871. There are later windows from 1920 in the south wall of the Lady Chapel. In the north aisle is a small part of an Anglo-Saxon circular cross-shaft carved with interlace decoration dating from the late 10th or the 11th century.

There are 76 memorials in the church. These include the 14th-century tomb of Ralph Davenport with the recumbent figure of a knight wearing plate armour with a gorget (collar) of mail (armour consisting of linked metal rings) and a conical helmet, a tomb chest of 1654, and a recumbent effigy (statue) of Lady Egerton, who died in 1599. The church also contains two sanctuary chairs and six old chests, one of which is iron-bound and dates from the 13th century. There is a ring of eight bells, six of which were recast in 1925 by Taylor's of Loughborough from the metal of the previous four 17th-century bells. The other two bells were added in 1998 and were also supplied by Taylors. The organ was made by J. J. Binns for King's Hall, Stoke-on-Trent in 1912. It was presented to the church by Stoke City Council in 1962 and was rebuilt and installed by Reeves and Merner. The parish registers begin in 1572 and the churchwardens' accounts in 1711, but the latter are incomplete.

== External features ==
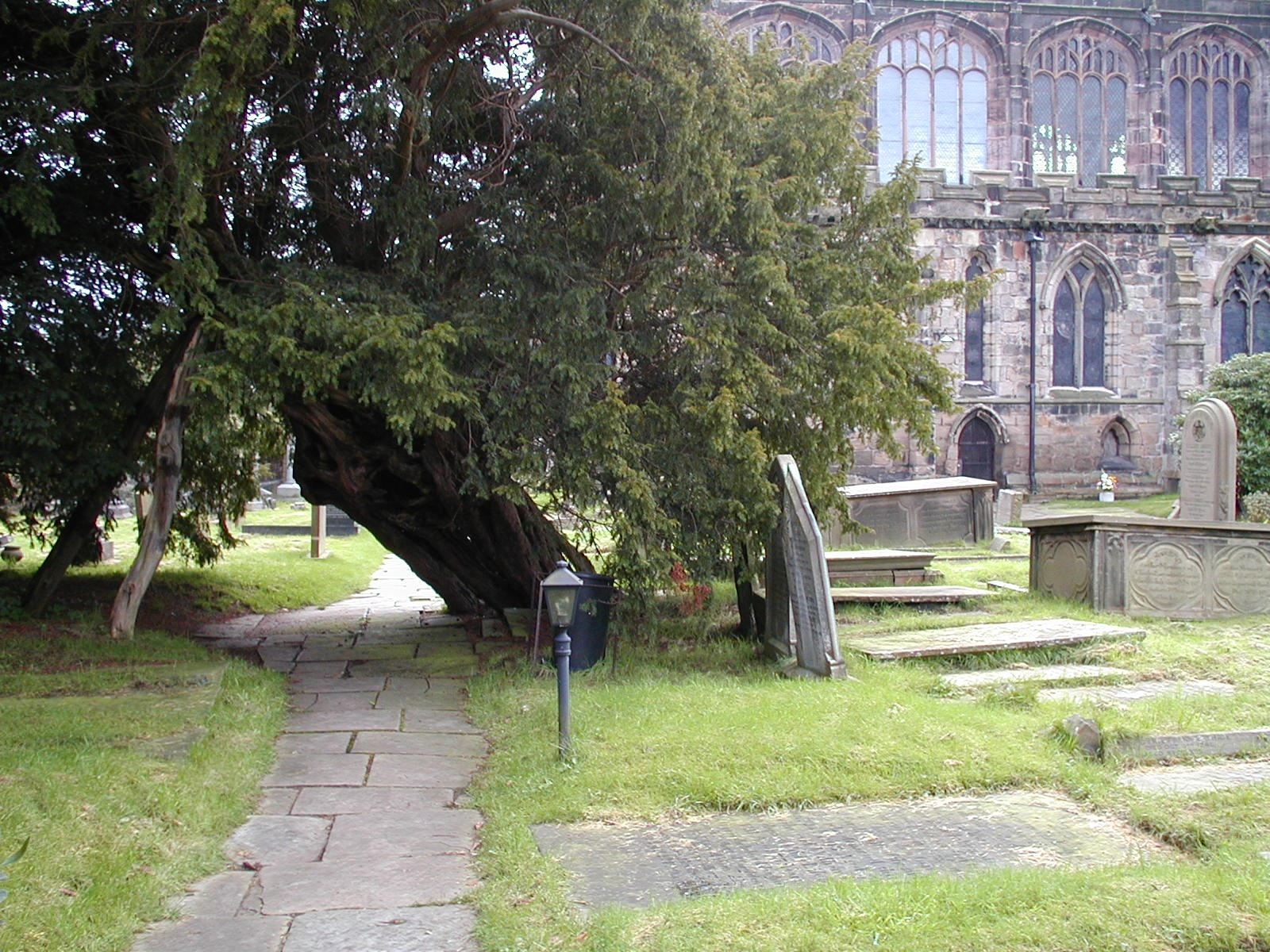
Yew tree in Astbury churchyard

The churchyard contains 51 gravestones dating from the 17th century. The most important monument is the canopied tomb of a member of the Venables family, which dates from the late 13th century; crocketed pinnacles on the canopy date from the 17th century. Formerly inside the church, the tomb contains two figures, male and female, with their hands clasped in prayer. The only one of its kind in Cheshire, it is listed Grade II*, and is a scheduled monument. There are two further notable memorials in the churchyard, one to the north and the other to the south of the Venables tomb. Both are in yellow sandstone, date from the medieval period, and include weathered recumbent effigies. The one to the north possibly depicts a cleric with his hands in prayer, and the one to the south is a knight in armour with a missing leg. The churchyard also contains a sundial, consisting of two octagonal steps that were originally the base of a 16th-century cross supporting an 18th-century octagonal pillar. In addition to being listed, it is also a scheduled monument. The gateway to the churchyard dates from the 17th century, and consists of a yellow sandstone arch with crocketed pinnacles and a battlemented parapet. All of these structures are listed as Grade II. The churchyard contains the war graves of 16 British servicemen, 15 of World War I, and one of World War II. A yew tree in the churchyard is believed to be over 1,000 years old. There is an extension to the burial ground just outside the village on the west side of the A34: 'Astbury Cemetery'. This was in use by 1946.

Listed buildings associated with St Mary's Church, Astbury
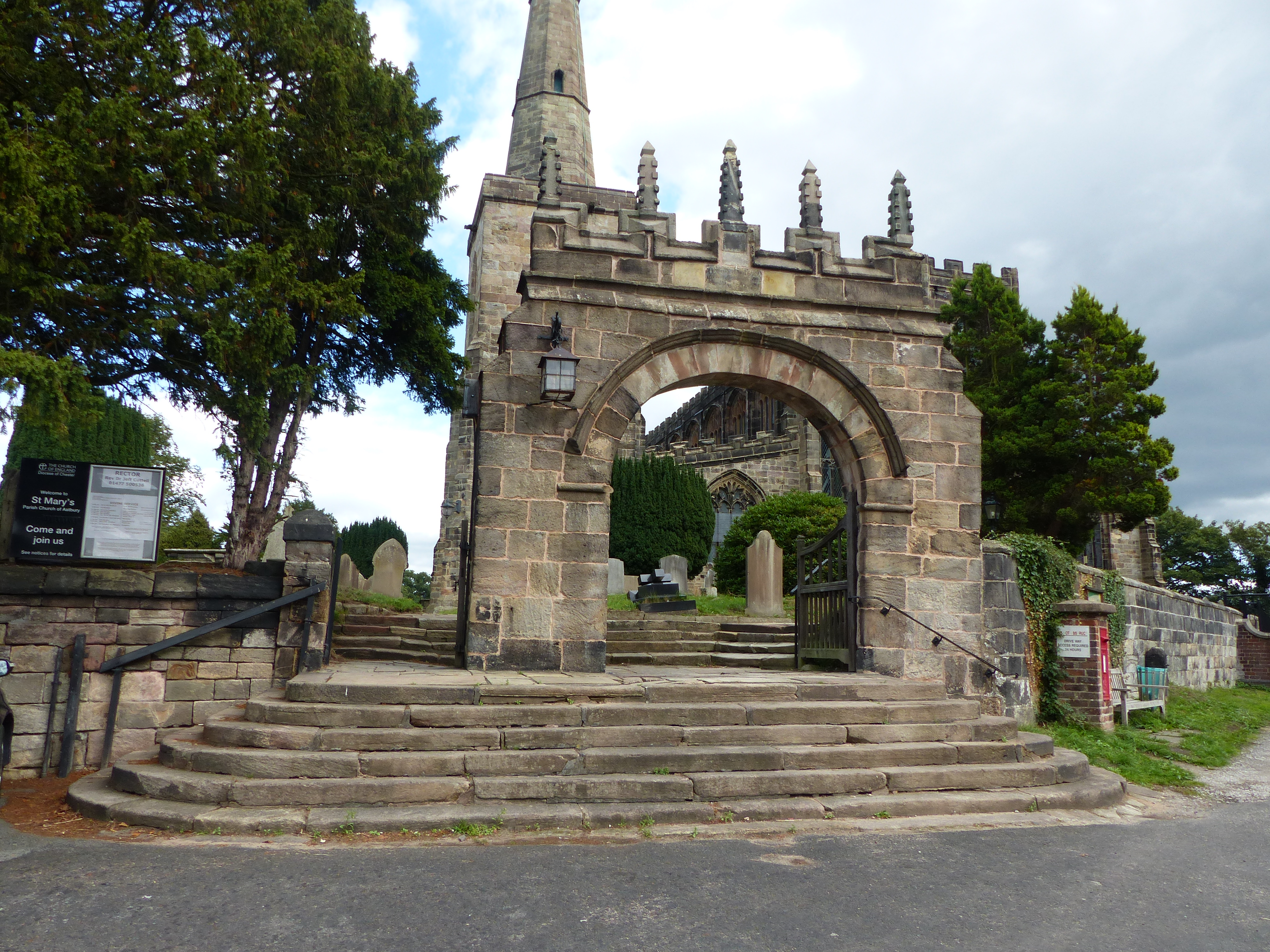
Gateway

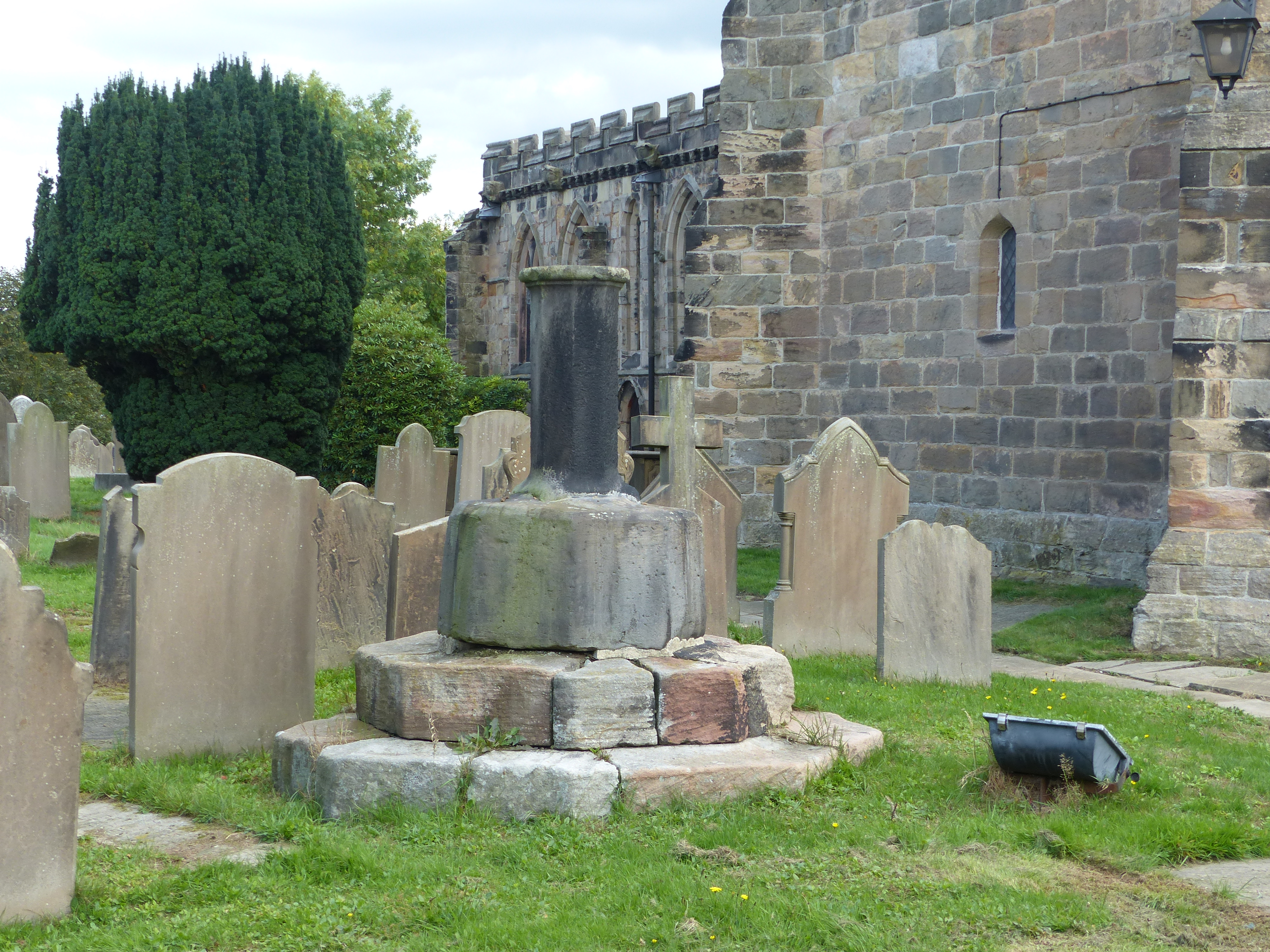
Cross base and shaft

Venables tomb

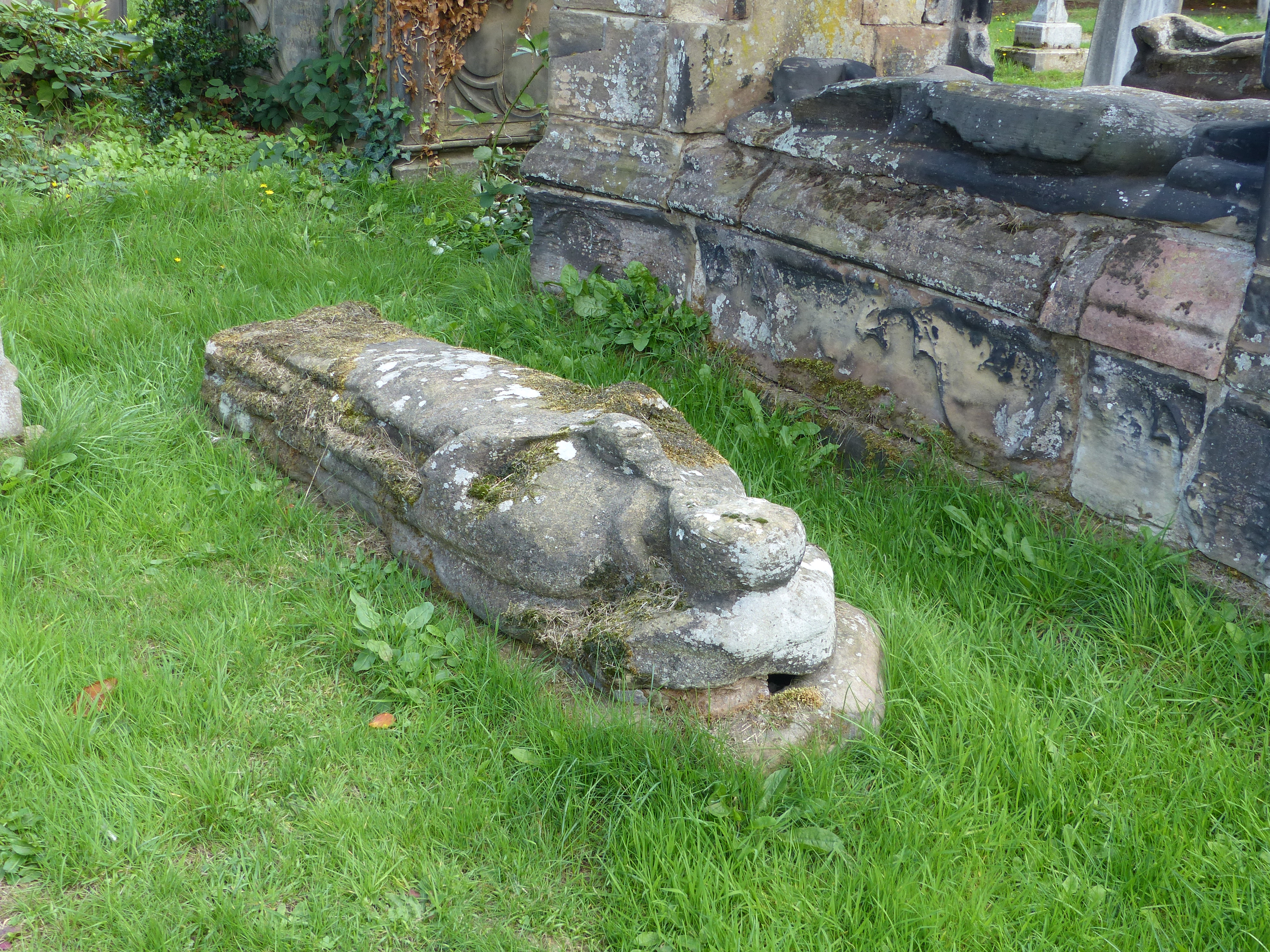
Tomb south of Venables tomb

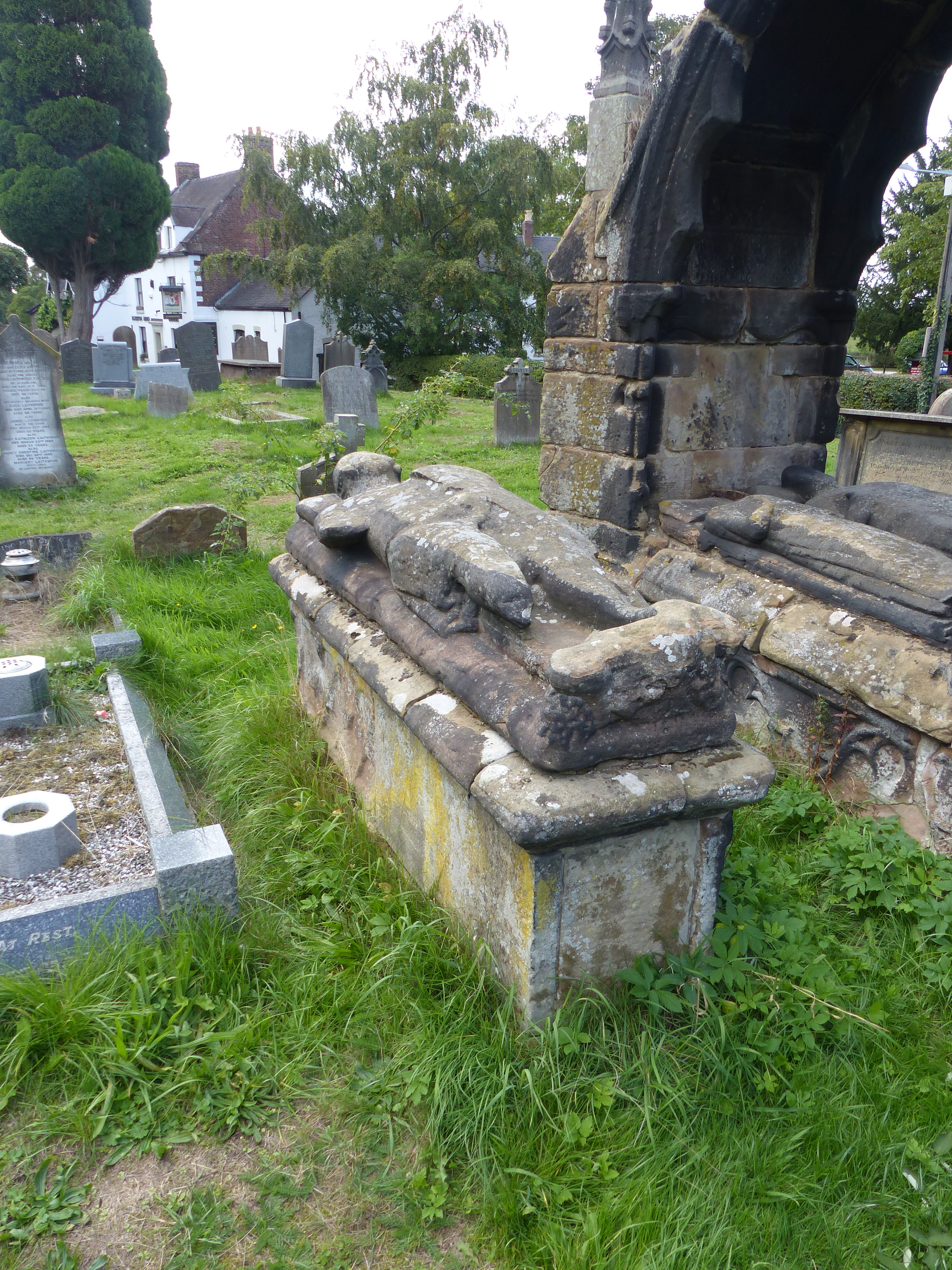
Tomb north of Venables tomb

== Assessment ==
The church was designated on 14 February 1967 by English Heritage as a Grade I listed building. Grade I listing means that the building is acknowledged to be "of exceptional interest, sometimes considered to be internationally important". The architectural historian Raymond Richards, writing in 1947, considered it to be one of the most beautiful churches in the county. The authors of the Buildings of England series call it "one of the most exciting Cheshire churches". Clifton-Taylor includes it in his list of "outstanding" English parish churches, and Simon Jenkins awards it three stars in his book England's Thousand Best Churches.

== Present day ==
St Mary's Church stands in an elevated position overlooking the village green on the south side of the village. It is an active Anglican parish church in the diocese of Chester, the archdeaconry of Macclesfield and the deanery of Congleton. The church holds traditional Anglican services and activities for younger people on Sundays. It runs a Prayer Group, a Toddler Group, and groups for other ages of children. The church publishes a monthly parish magazine.

== See also ==
- Grade I listed buildings in Cheshire East
- Grade I listed churches in Cheshire
- Listed buildings in Newbold Astbury
- List of church restorations and alterations by Anthony Salvin

== Notes ==
^{A} Andor Harvey Gomme (1930–2008) was Professor of English Literature and Architectural History at Keele University. In his obituary it was stated that he "became one of the best British architectural historians since John Ruskin".
