= Smallwood, Cheshire =

Village in Cheshire, England

Coordinates: 53.139°N 2.290°W

Smallwood
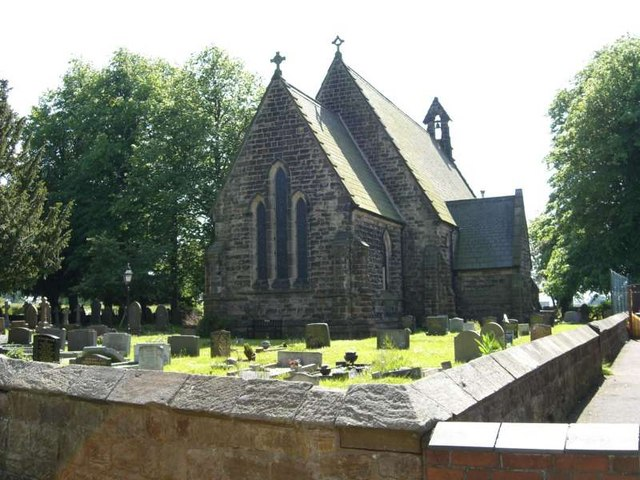
- St John the Baptist, Smallwood

- Location within Cheshire
- Population: 614 (2011)
- OS grid reference: SJ806602
- Civil parish: Smallwood
- Unitary authority: Cheshire East
- Ceremonial county: Cheshire
- Region: North West
- Country: England
- Sovereign state: United Kingdom
- Post town: SANDBACH
- Postcode district: CW11
- Dialling code: 01477
- Police: Cheshire
- Fire: Cheshire
- Ambulance: North West
- UK Parliament: Congleton

Smallwood is a civil parish and small village in the unitary authority of Cheshire East and the ceremonial county of Cheshire, England. The village is approximately 3 miles (4.8 km) east of Sandbach and 3 miles south-west of Congleton. It is based in a rural area and is largely agricultural. At the 2001 census, the parish had a population of 491, increasing to 614 at the 2011 Census.

There is a primary school (Smallwood Church of England Primary Academy) within the village, and also a children's day nursery attached to a farm. St John's Parish Church, built between 1843 and 1846, is Grade II listed.

A Village Design Statement was created by Smallwood Parish Council, residents of Smallwood and Cheshire East Council. It gives a full description of the village, including its history. In addition it is also a planning document adopted by Cheshire East Council on 14 October 2010.

== See also ==
- Listed buildings in Smallwood, Cheshire
