= Brereton, Cheshire =

Civil parish in Cheshire, England

Coordinates: 53.174°N 2.334°W

Brereton
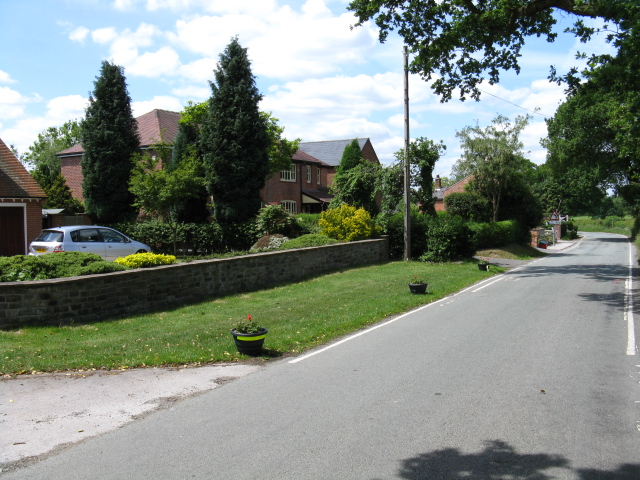
- School Lane, Brereton Green

- Location within Cheshire
- Population: 1,190 (2011)
- OS grid reference: SJ777642
- Civil parish: Brereton
- Unitary authority: Cheshire East
- Ceremonial county: Cheshire
- Region: North West
- Country: England
- Sovereign state: United Kingdom
- Post town: SANDBACH
- Postcode district: CW11
- Dialling code: 01477
- Police: Cheshire
- Fire: Cheshire
- Ambulance: North West
- UK Parliament: Congleton

Brereton /ˈbrɪərtən/ is a civil parish in the Cheshire East district, in the ceremonial county of Cheshire, England. At the 2011 census, the population was 1,190. Brereton is mentioned in the Domesday book as the Manor of Bretune. The civil parish includes the hamlets of Brereton Green, Brereton Heath, Smethwick Green, Medhurst Green, Sandlow Green and Davenport.

Brereton Hall, a Grade I listed, Elizabethan house that is in private ownership and not open to the public, was the family seat of the Lords Brereton, but the Lordship ended in 1722 when the fifth Baron Brereton died a bachelor. The adjoining Church of St Oswald is a Grade II* listed building described as "an unusually complete late Perpendicular church". The Bear's Head (formerly the Boar's Head) is a notable half-timbered public house, dated 1615 and also listed at Grade II*.

== History ==
The civil parish was created in 1936 by uniting the civil parishes of Brereton cum Smethwick and Davenport. Brereton cum Smethwick was an Ancient Parish in Northwich Hundred. Davenport began as a township in Astbury Ancient Parish (which has had no separate civic identity since 1866.) Davenport was created a separate civil parish in 1866 which existed until the merger in 1936. Both these "parent civil parishes" of Brereton had similar administrative histories: both were in Northwich Hundred, and they both later became members of Congleton Poor Law Union and Rural Sanitary District. Later still, they became part of Congleton Rural District, in which they remained until they merged.

== Culture ==
The parish has used the legend of Lord Brereton and the bear in 'The Brereton Bear Festival'. The legend is that William Brereton killed his valet in a temper after he was interrupted at his meal. His punishment was to be a fight with a bear, but the king gave him three days to make a muzzle to contain the bear. After three days Brereton faced and muzzled the bear. The muzzled bear became the crest on the Brereton coat of arms.

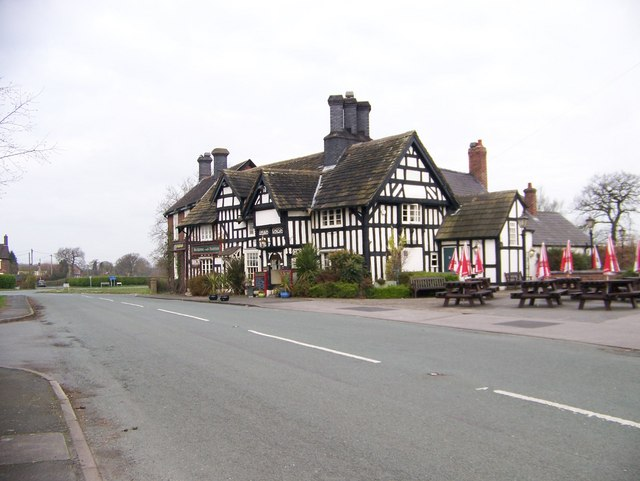
The Bears Head, Brereton Green

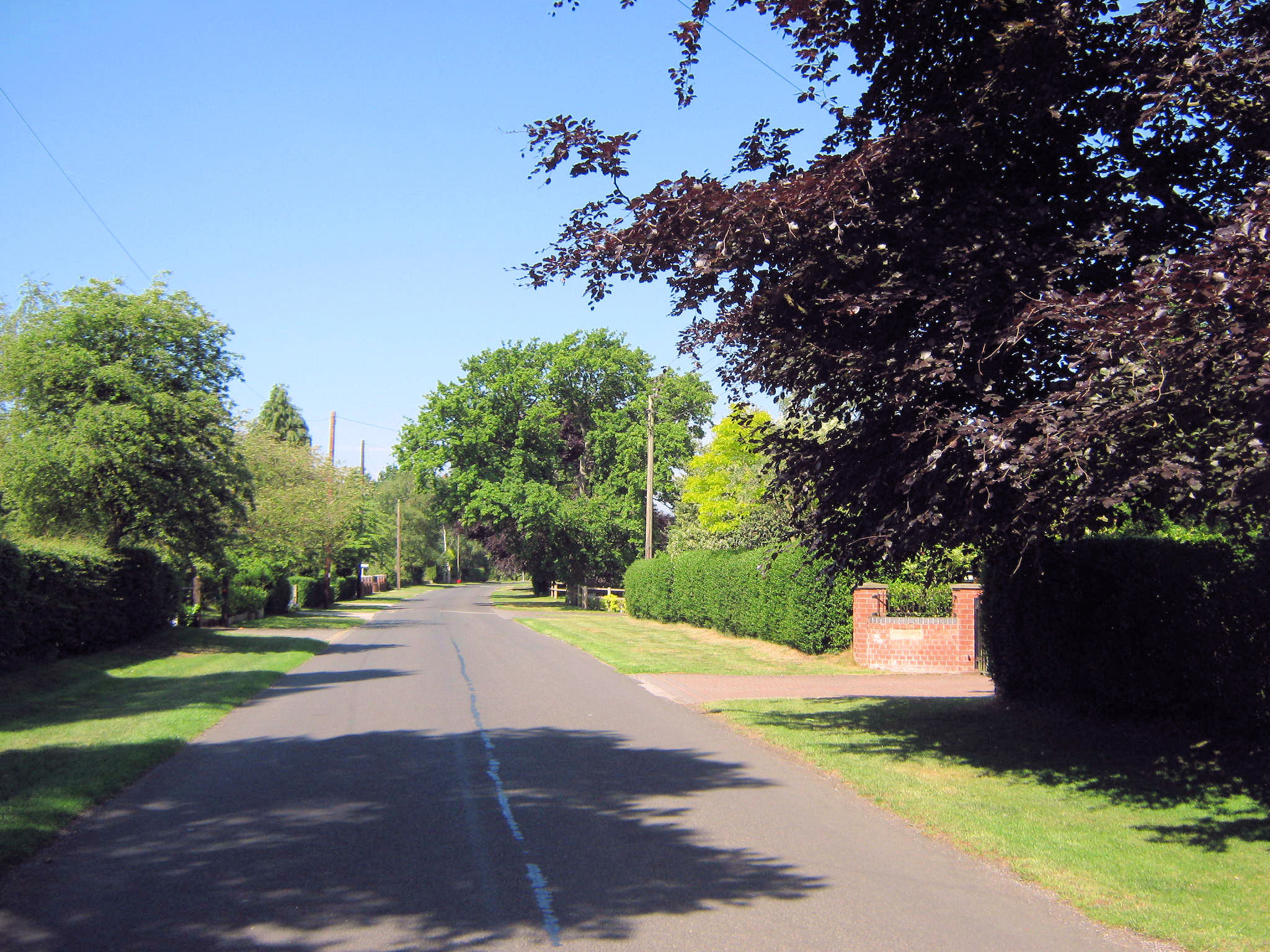
West on Brereton Heath Lane

In 2004, the Church introduced a Bear Festival to the Parish as a means of raising funds for St Oswald's church, which is now held in July and August in odd-numbered years. Local residents and organisations create displays on the theme of bears to raise money for St Oswald's Church and local organizations.

Felicia Hemans's poem The Vassal's Lament for the Fallen Tree of 1824 refers to another legend, one she has from William Camden, that the falling of trees here foretells the death of an heir.

== Brereton Heath ==
Brereton Heath is a country park and Local Nature Reserve (LNR) maintained by Cheshire East Ranger Service. It comprises an area of lowland heath surrounding a flooded quarry from which silica sand was extracted between 1959 and 1972. The area was opened as a country park in 1982 and designated as a Local Nature Reserve in 2005. The designated LNR covers an area of 33.69 hectares (83.2 acres).

== See also ==
- Brereton Hall
- Listed buildings in Brereton, Cheshire
- St Oswald's Church, Brereton
