= Massingham, Norfolk =

Massingham may refer to any of the following in North Norfolk:

- Great Massingham,
- the former RAF Great Massingham
- Little Massingham
- Massingham railway station (closed in 1959).
