= East Buckland =

Village in Devon, England

Coordinates: 51.062700°N 3.887999°W

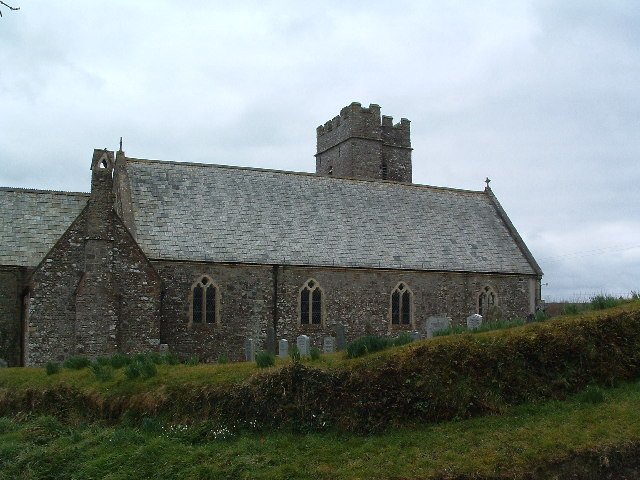
- St Michael's Church, East_Buckland

- Location within Devon
- OS grid reference: SS6779630959
- Civil parish: East and West Buckland
- District: North Devon
- Shire county: Devon
- Region: South West
- Country: England
- Sovereign state: United Kingdom
- Post town: BARNSTAPLE
- Postcode district: EX32
- Dialling code: 01598
- Police: Devon and Cornwall
- Fire: Devon and Somerset
- Ambulance: South Western
- UK Parliament: North Devon

East Buckland is a small village and former civil parish, now in the parish of East and West Buckland, in the North Devon district of Devon, England, next to the village of West Buckland. The village has an Anglican church which is frequented by the nearby West Buckland School. In 1961 the parish had a population of 70.

On 1 April 1986 the parish was abolished and merged with West Buckland to form "East and West Buckland".
