= Massingham railway station =

Former railway station in Norfolk, England

Coordinates: 52.7913°N 0.6583°E

Massingham
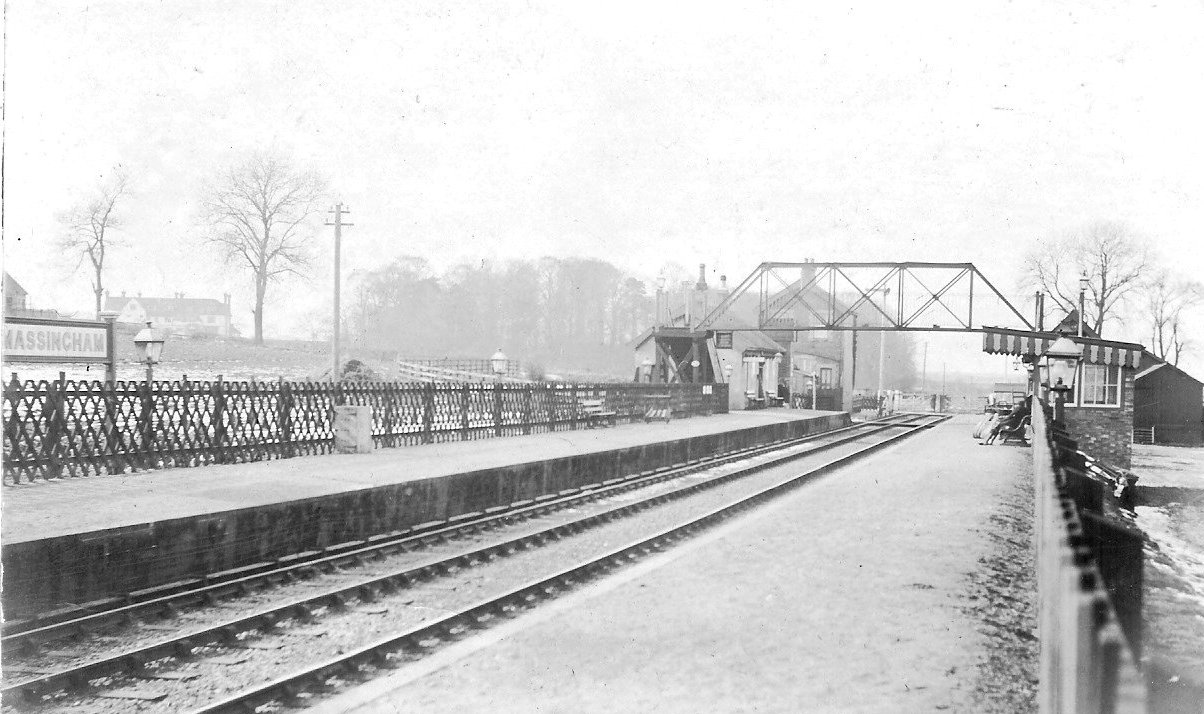
- A view circa 1910. Note the criss- cross fencing typical of the M&GN Joint Railway

General information
- Location: Little Massingham, King's Lynn and West Norfolk, Norfolk; England
- Grid reference: TF793248
- Platforms: 2

Other information
- Status: Disused

History
- Pre-grouping: Lynn and Fakenham Railway; Midland and Great Northern Joint Railway
- Post-grouping: Midland and Great Northern Joint Railway; Eastern Region of British Railways

Key dates
- 16 August 1879: Opened
- 2 March 1959: Closed to passengers
- 1 January 1966: Closed to freight
Location

Massingham railway station is a closed railway station that served the villages of Great Massingham and Little Massingham in North Norfolk, England. It was situated at Little Massingham and was on the line between South Lynn and Great Yarmouth and served the villages of Little and Great Massingham and Harpley.

== History ==
A driving force behind the building of the Lynn & Fakenham railway line was the Reverend Joseph Lloyd Brereton of Little Massingham. Supporters of the project used to meet at his rectory in the 1870s. As a result of their endeavours the line was built from Lynn to Massingham and the station and line was opened by the Midland and Great Northern Joint Railway on 16 August 1879. Later the line was extended and continued onto Fakenham opening on 16 August 1880.

It later was managed by the London and North Eastern Railway until nationalisation in 1948 when it came under the control of British Railways until closure in 1959.

This was abbreviated to (M&GN), interpreted by many as meaning the Muddle & Get Nowhere Railway. Massingham was also the only station between South Lynn and Fakenham to have a footbridge. After the line was closed the main ticket office and waiting rooms and the stationmaster's house were converted into two houses.

Preceding station	Disused railways	Following station
Hillington	Midland and Great Northern	East Rudham
