= Johannes Kuenen =

Dutch physicist (1866–1922)

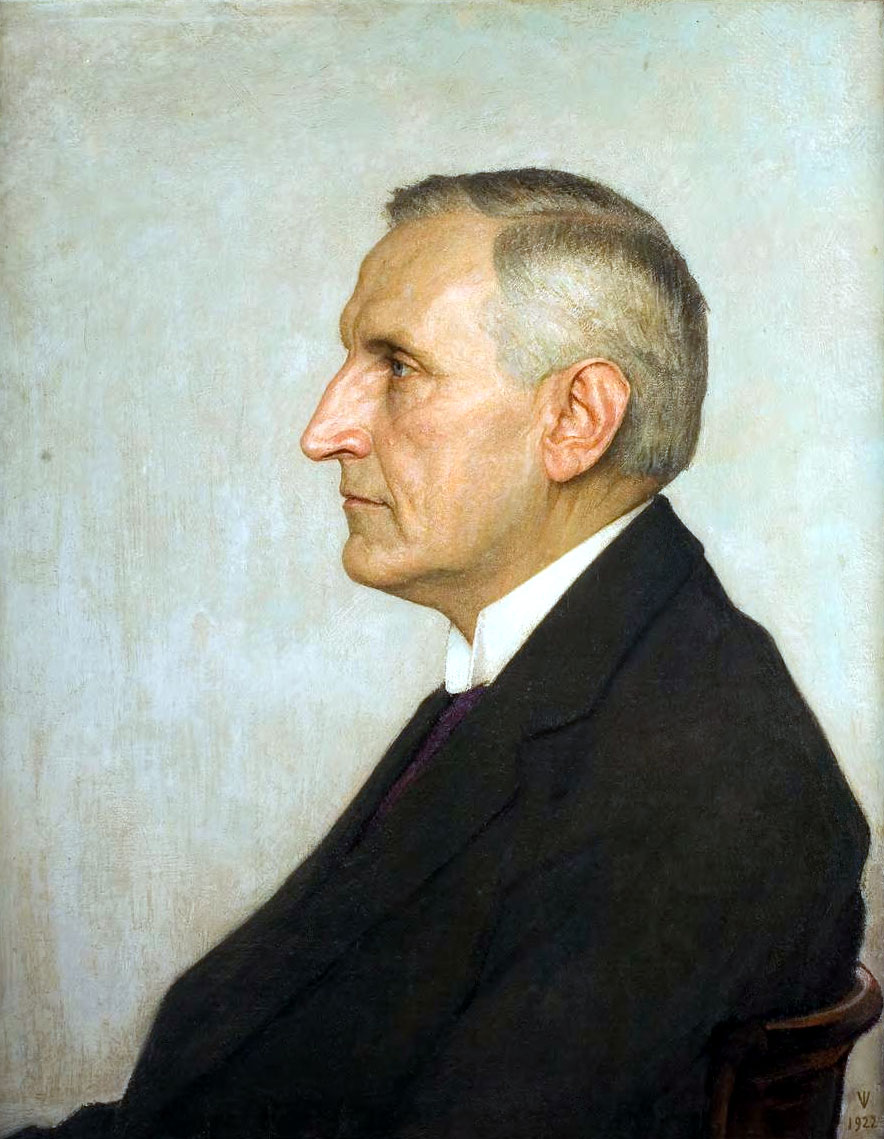
Johannes Petrus Kuenen.

Johannes Petrus Kuenen (11 October 1866 in Leiden – 25 September 1922 in Leiden) was a Dutch physicist.

== Biography ==
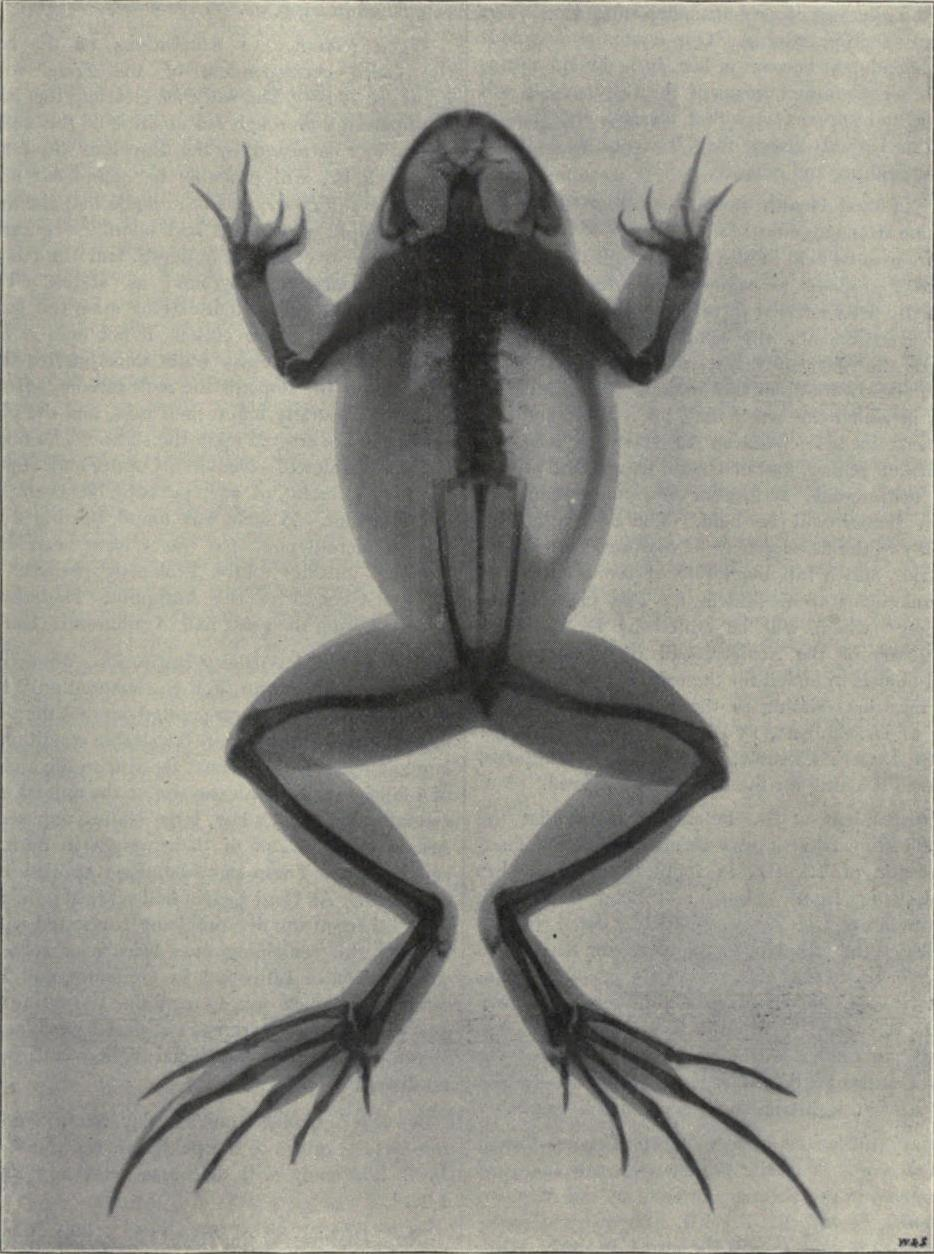
X-ray photograph of a frog by Kuenen and Edward Waymouth Reid, published in Nature, vol. liii. p. 419, 5 March 1896

Kuenen was the son of the professor of theology Abraham Kuenen and his wife Wiepkje Muurling. His son Philip Henry Kuenen was professor of geology. From 1884 to 1889 he studied at the University of Leiden, where he graduated in 1892. He became a professor in physics in 1895 at University College, Dundee in Dundee, Scotland, where he worked until 1907. For most of this period the college was part of the University of St Andrews. While at Dundee he performed early experiments with x-rays with the physiologist Edward Waymouth Reid. In 1907 he was appointed professor of physics at Leiden University. Heike Kamerlingh Onnes and Kuenen led the Kamerlingh Onnes Physics Laboratory.

On the basis of his scientific work he was elected in 1911 as a member of the Royal Netherlands Academy of Arts and Sciences (KNAW), and became a member of the Hollandsche Maatschappij der Wetenschappen in 1915.

== Retrograde condensation ==
He discovered retrograde condensation and published his findings in April 1892 in the Ph.D. thesis with the title "Metingen betreffende het oppervlak van Van der Waals voor mengsels van koolzuur en chloormethyl". (Measurements on the Van der Waals surface for mixtures of carbonic acid and methyl chloride).
