= Betty Kirkwood =

British epidemiologist

Betty Kirkwood FMedSci
- Scientific career
- Fields: Epidemiology
- Workplaces: London School of Hygiene & Tropical Medicine

Betty Rosamund Kirkwood FMedSci is Professor of Epidemiology & International Health at the London School of Hygiene & Tropical Medicine. Her research is driven by a desire to improve the health of mothers and young children in low and middle-income countries (LMICs). Her textbook, Essential Medical Statistics, co-authored with Professor Jonathan Sterne.

== Educational and early career ==
- Educated in Mathematics at New Hall College, Cambridge.
- Masters in Statistics at Imperial College London.

== Publications ==
She is a co-author of the textbook Kirkwood, Betty R., Jonathan A. C. Sterne, and Betty R. Kirkwood. Essential Medical Statistics. Malden, Mass: Blackwell Science, 2003. ISBN 9781444392845 (held in 732 libraries according to WorldCat).

Her most cited journal articles are:

- Bhutta ZA, Ahmed T, Black RE, Cousens S, Dewey K, Giugliani E, Haider BA, Kirkwood B, Morris SS, Sachdev HP, Shekar M. What works? Interventions for maternal and child undernutrition and survival. The Lancet. 2008 Feb 2;371(9610):417-40. Cited 2161 times according to Google Scholar
- Edmond KM, Zandoh C, Quigley MA, Amenga-Etego S, Owusu-Agyei S, Kirkwood BR. Delayed breastfeeding initiation increases risk of neonatal mortality. Pediatrics. 2006 Mar 1;117(3):e380-6. Cited 1147 times according to Google Scholar
- Patel V, Weiss HA, Chowdhary N, Naik S, Pednekar S, Chatterjee S, De Silva MJ, Bhat B, Araya R, King M, Simon G. Effectiveness of an intervention led by lay health counsellors for depressive and anxiety disorders in primary care in Goa, India (MANAS): a cluster randomised controlled trial. The Lancet. 2010 Dec 18;376(9758):2086-9 Cited 493 times according to Google Scholar
- Bahl R, Frost C, Kirkwood BR, Edmond K, Martines J, Bhandari N, Arthur P. Infant feeding patterns and risks of death and hospitalization in the first half of infancy: multicentre cohort study. Bulletin of the World Health Organization. 2005;83:418-26. Cited 386 times according to Google Scholar

== Awards and honours ==
- Fellow of the Academy of Medical Sciences, 2003
- George Macdonald Medal, Royal Society of Hygiene & Tropical Medicine: 13 September 2017
