= Retrograde condensation =

Retrograde condensation occurs when gas in a tube is compressed beyond the point of condensation with the effect that the liquid evaporates again. This is the opposite of condensation: the so-called retrograde condensation.

== Description ==
If the volume of two gases that are kept at constant temperature and pressure below critical conditions is gradually reduced, condensation will start. When a certain volume is reached, the amount of condensation will gradually increase upon further reduction in volume until the gases are liquefied. If the composition of the gases lies between their true and pseudo critical points the condensate formed will disappear on continued reduction of volume. This disappearance of condensation is called retrograde condensation.

Because most natural gas found in petroleum reservoirs is not a pure product, when non-associated gas is extracted from a field under supercritical pressure/temperature conditions (i.e., the pressure in the reservoir decreases below dewpoint), condensate liquids may form during the isothermic depressurizing, an effect called retrograde condensation.

== Discovery ==
Dutch physicist Johannes Kuenen discovered retrograde condensation and published his findings in April 1892 in his Ph.D. thesis with the title "Metingen betreffende het oppervlak van Van der Waals voor mengsels van koolzuur en chloormethyl" (Measurements on the Van der Waals surface for mixtures of carbonic acid and methyl chloride).
