= East and West Buckland =

Coordinates: 51.07°N 3.90°W

- Civil parish
- Interactive map of East and West Buckland
- Country: England
- County: Devon
- District: North Devon
- Civil parish merger: 1 April 1986

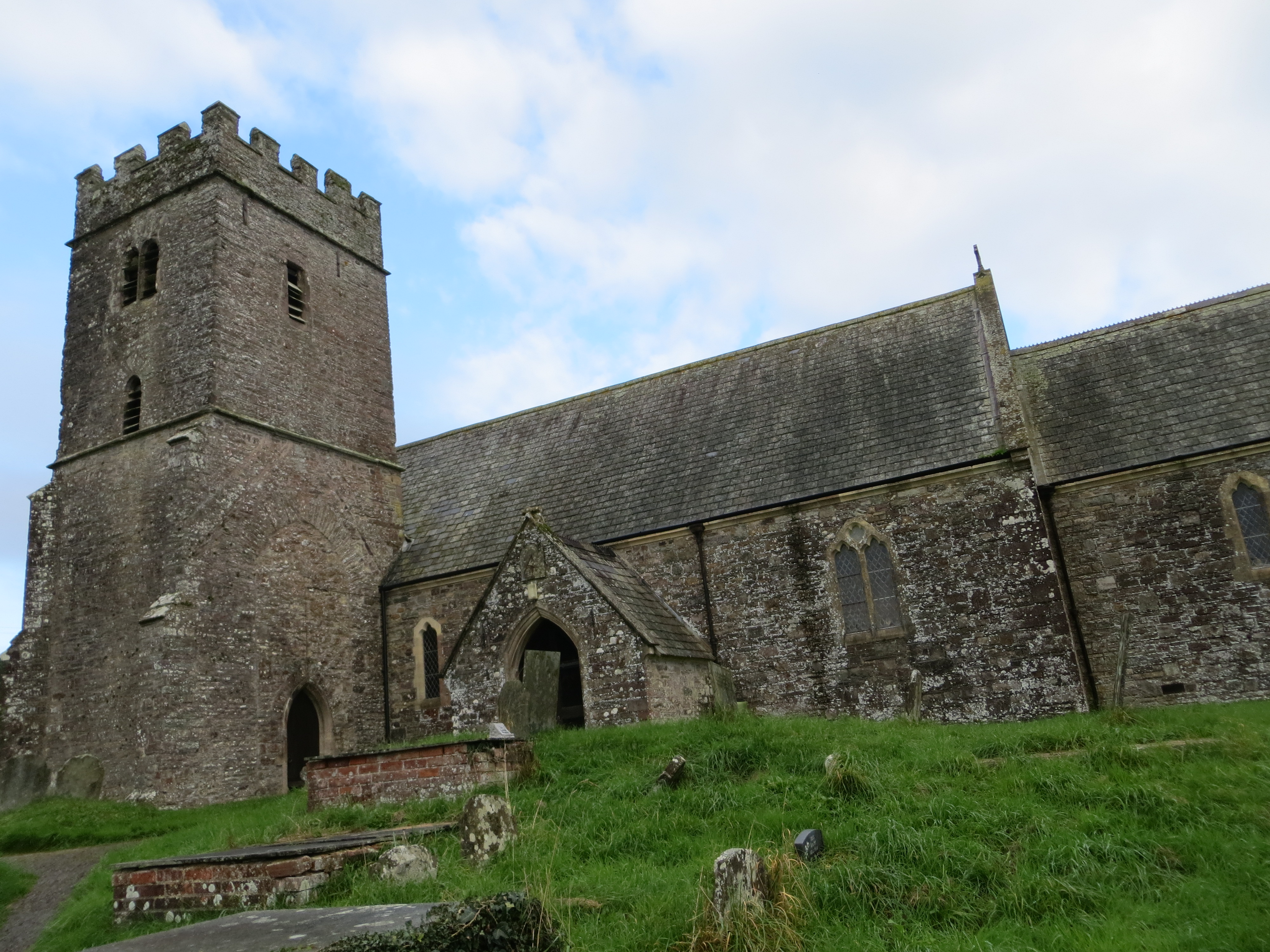
The church of St Michael at East Buckland

East and West Buckland is a civil parish in the English county of Devon.

Forming part of the district of North Devon its main settlements are West Buckland and East Buckland. These were separate civil parishes until their merger on 1 April 1986.
