= John Smyth Macdonald =

John Smyth Macdonald FRS (1867, Dublin – 29 March 1941) was a British physiologist.

== Early life and education ==
Macdonald was born in Dublin, Ireland, in 1867 to George Macdonald, a tailor, and his wife, Margaret, née Smyth. The family soon moved to Waterford and subsequently to Chester in England, where he was educated at the King's School for Boys. In 1886, he went to Emmanuel College, Cambridge, where he studied mathematics, graduating with a third-class B.A. degree in 1889.

From 1889 to 1891 he studied medicine at University College, Liverpool. In 1897 he qualified L.R.C.P., M.R.C.S. by passing the Scottish Conjoint Board Examination.

== Career ==
In 1891, Macdonald was appointed the Holt Fellow in Physiology at University College, Liverpool, where he did research under Francis Gotch from 1891 to 1897. After gaining his medical qualifications, he served as house physician at the Liverpool Royal Infirmary for about six months in 1897, under James Barr. From 1897 to 1899, he was a lecturer in physiology at University College, Dundee under Waymouth Reid. In 1899, he returned to University College, Liverpool (from 1903, the University of Liverpool), as senior lecturer in physiology (1899–1903), with a British Medical Association research scholarship (1899–1901), under Charles Scott Sherrington.

From 1903 to 1914, Macdonald held the chair in Physiology at the University College, Sheffield. In 1906–1907, he additionally served as the acting Dean of the Medical Faculty, during the period when the college became Sheffield University. At Sheffield he planned the physiology department, which was at that date one of the leading facilities in the subject in England. In 1914, he returned to the University of Liverpool, succeeding Sherrington as the Holt Professor of Physiology, where he remained until his retirement in 1932. He also served as the Dean of the Medical Faculty (1917–20).

== Research ==
Macdonald's early work was on nerves, initially in collaboration with first Francis Gotch and then Waymouth Reid. W. J. O'Connor states:

In his first work he followed after Gotch in using the galvanometers of the time to investigate the effect of temperature on the excitability of nerve and muscle (paper with Gotch in the Journal of Physiology, 1896) and then at Dundee in 1898 Macdonald and Waymouth Reid produced electrical records of impulse activity in the phrenic nerve in relation to respiration, and tried to relate activity in the vagus nerve to changes in arterial blood pressure.

He continued to research this topic at Liverpool, publishing a series of papers in the Journal of Physiology and the Proceedings of the Royal Society. He studied nerve electrical currents, potassium and chloride ions, among other topics. In around 1908, he began to research the mechanism of contraction in striated muscle, publishing an influential paper on the topic in the Quarterly Journal of Experimental Physiology. In around 1912, his attention turned to the problem of measuring muscular work in humans. He built a human calorimeter, now in the Wellcome Medical Museum, with which he studied how the heat produced was related to factors such as the intensity of exercise and the subject's weight. With F. A. Duffield, he also studied respiratory gas exchange.

== Awards and honours ==
He was a member of the Physiological Society from 1894. He was elected a Fellow of the Royal Society in 1917.

== Personal life ==
Macdonald married Katherine Mary Stewart, who was from Stornaway, in 1898. The couple had eight children, three sons and five daughters. One of his daughters, Margaret S. Macdonald (Margaret Munday), collaborated with Macdonald at the end of his career. Another son, George Macdonald, was an eminent malariologist. After his retirement, he lived with his son in Lincolnshire and at Bridge of Allan in Stirlingshire, Scotland. He died at Bridge of Allan in 1941.

== Selected publications ==
- "Studies in the Heat-Production Associated with Muscular Work.(Preliminary Communication: Section A.-Methods; Section B.-Results.)". Proceedings of the Royal Society of London. Series B, Containing Papers of a Biological Character. 87 (593): 96–112. 1913. doi:10.1098/rspb.1913.0064.
- "Man's Mechanical Efficiency in Work Performance and the Cost of the Movements Involved (Treated Separately)". Proceedings of the Royal Society of London. Series B, Containing Papers of a Biological Character. 89 (618): 394–410. 1917. doi:10.1098/rspb.1917.0001.
