= William Henry Whitfeld =

William Henry Whitfeld (15 October 1856, Ashford, Kent – 1 December 1915) was an English mathematician, leading expert on bridge and whist, and card editor for The Field. He is known as the poser of the Whitfeld Six problem in double dummy bridge.

After graduating from Chatham House Grammar School, Whitfeld matriculated in 1876 at Trinity College, Cambridge. He graduated there in 1880 with B.A. as twelfth wrangler in the Mathematical Tripos and in 1884 with M.A. For several years he was a tutor and lecturer at Cavendish College, Cambridge. In 1880 he published some double-dummy problems in whist in The Cambridge Review: A Journal of University Life and Thought (an undergraduates' journal founded in 1879). His famous problem now known as "Whitfeld Six" was published in the London magazine The Field in the January 31st 1885 issue.

The first publication of the problem in the Field was followed by other interesting and difficult hands composed by Mr. Whitfeld, as well as by articles on whist, in which his mathematical genius was displayed in close reasoning and subtle analysis. In 1892 he became regularly connected with the staff of the Field ...

Whitfeld's whist problems are related to the mathematics of nested balanced incomplete block designs. He wrote the article Bridge for the 11th edition of the Encyclopaedia Britannica. He also wrote a 6-page essay entitled Probabilities for the 1902 book Principles and Practice of Whist.

In 1900 he married Ida Alberta Russell (1877-1958). They had three sons and three daughters. The three sons were Francis Russell (1902–1975), Miles (1903–1997), and Ivan (1904–1983) and three daughters were Ida Mary (Mary) (1901-1987), Rachel (Ray) Elizabeth (1908-1993) and Margaret ("Maggie") Penmon (1913-1995). All moved to Western Australia, Miles and Ivan first later their mother Ida Alberta with Francis and the three daughters came a few months later. Ida Alberta, Mother, Ivan, Ida Mary, Rachel and Margret eventually returned to England leaving Francis and Miles in Australia.
