= Little Massingham =

Village in Norfolk, England

Coordinates: 52.78494°N 0.65872°E

- Location within Norfolk
- Area: 9.27 km^{2} (3.58 sq mi)
- Population: 74
  - Density: 8/km^{2} (21/sq mi)
- OS grid reference: TF793241
- Civil parish: Little Massingham
- District: King's Lynn and West Norfolk
- Shire county: Norfolk
- Region: East
- Country: England
- Sovereign state: United Kingdom
- Post town: KING'S LYNN
- Postcode district: PE32
- Police: Norfolk
- Fire: Norfolk
- Ambulance: East of England

Little Massingham is a small village and civil parish in the English county of Norfolk. It is located on the northern boundary of Great Massingham. It covers an area of 9.27 km^{2} (3.58 sq mi) and had a population of 74 in 37 households at the 2001 census. For the purposes of local government, it falls within the district of King's Lynn and West Norfolk.

== History of the parish ==
At the time of the Domesday Book in 1086, William the Conqueror bestowed upon Eudo, the son of Spiruwin, the Barony of Tateshale in Lincolnshire (now known as Tattershall). William also gave him the lands of Hillington, Grimston, Congham and Little Massingham that had belonged to Scula. Scula is thought to have been a general who served under Viking King Ragnald.

In 1302, these lands passed into the possession of Sir John de Thorpe, by right of his wife, Alice.

Later the estate of Little Massingham came into the family of the Le Stranges of Hunstanton, and in the 16th century, they passed to the Mordaunt family when Robert Mordaunt married Barbara le Strange.

In 1807 Sir Charles Mordaunt, the eighth baronet decided to sell the estate of Little Massingham and the advowson of the living to Joseph Wilson of Highbury Hill, Middlesex. Wilson was a rich and prosperous merchant and although having purchased Little Massingham he never lived there, but chose to use Stowlangtoft Hall, Suffolk as his country estate. However, he did install his son-in-law Charles D. Brereton as rector of Little Massingham.

Joseph Wilson's heir Henry Wilson of Stowlangtoft Hall succeeded him and in 1872 Henry's son Fuller Maitland Wilson sold the estate of Little Massingham.

Since that time there were a few more large landowners of Little Massingham before some of the estate was broken up.

It was recorded that in the early 19th century thirty or forty acres of wheat were grown in Little Massingham. In 1825 the cultivation had increased to between three and four hundred acres.

In the late 1800s:

Good Blue clay suitable for making both white and red bricks was found in the Parish, and near at hand there is a stratum of good sand, and a spring of water which has never been known to fail even in the dryest summers. A brick-yard has been made whence one million bricks are turned out per annum.

== St Andrew's Church ==
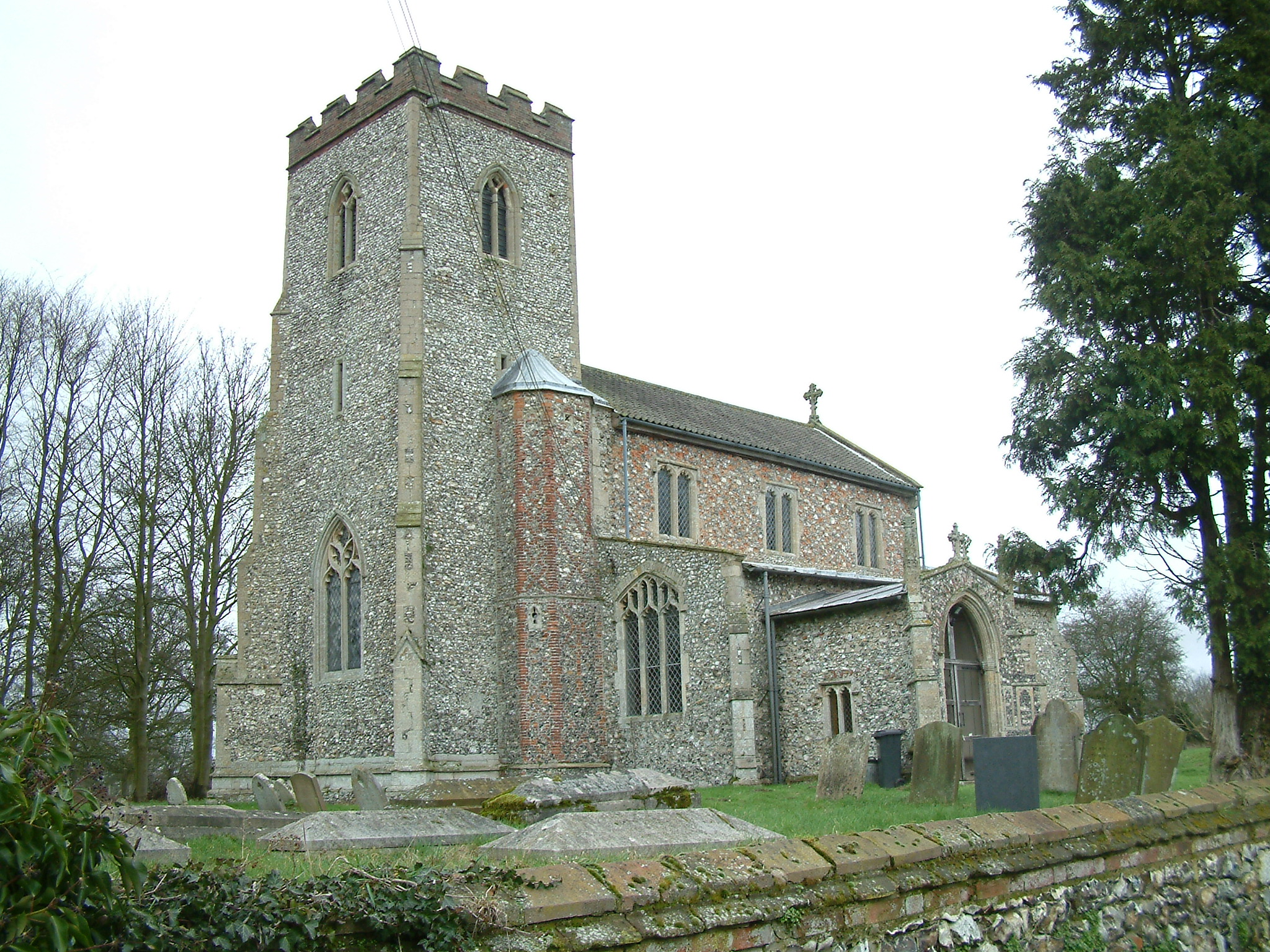
St Andrew's, Little Massingham

The Church of St Andrew with its square embattled tower, is a small but picturesque building. The principle entrance is by the south porch, which appears to rest on the foundation of some still earlier building. On each side of this entrance there are niches which once held the statues of the Virgin and St Andrew, while above it are two lichen-covered stone escutcheons, bearing the arms of the de Thorpes. The porch is lighted by small perpendicular windows, and around the bottom of the roof runs the inscription, carved in oak:

The hour cometh and now the true worshippers shall worship the Father in spirit and in truth.

The Church of St Andrew consists of a chancel and a nave. The nave is divided into aisles by octagonal pillars supporting pointed arches.

The pews were replaced in 1857 at the same time the roof was repaired and re-leaded, the floor tiled, the font (which formally stood behind the south door) removed to its present situation. Other improvements were made, under the supervision of a Mr Jeckel, an architect of Norwich. He designed the pulpit, composed of Caen stone and marble.

The present handsome inner roof of the chancel was added in 1880 by the Rev. J. L. Brereton.

The first recorded Rector of Massingham Parva was in 1286.

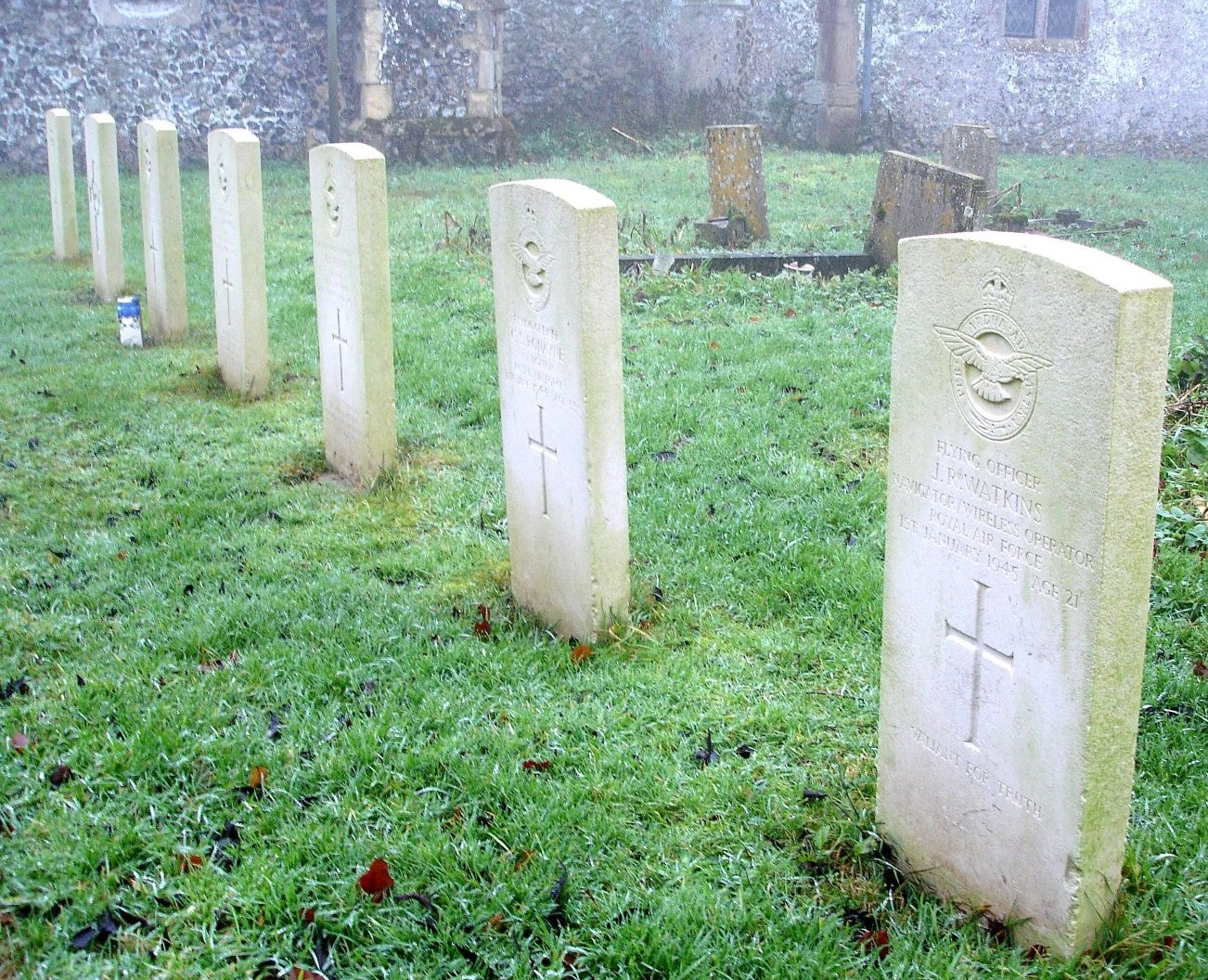
Graves of RAF aircrew at St Andrew's

The early Parish Registers were on parchment and date from the reign of Queen Elizabeth I. All the entries, up to the year 1599 were copied from earlier records, in accordance with a canon published in the reign of Elizabeth. The last chapter of Massingham Parva shows the date of 1559 for the first marriage. First burials are recorded as from 1715 and Christenings from 1754.

The church was used during World War II by nearby RAF Great Massingham. A roll of honour with the names of those who served at the airfield is kept in the church. The church yard contains graves of some of the aircrew from RAF Great Massingham .

== The station at Little Massingham ==
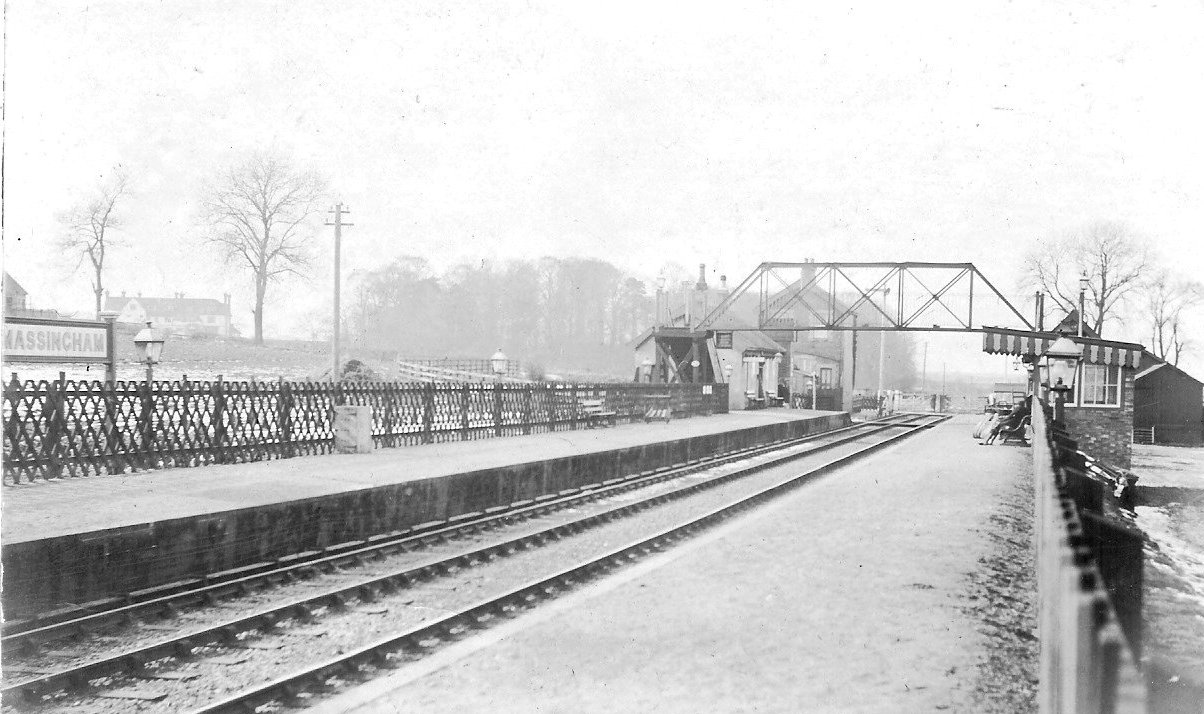
Little Massingham M&GN Station c1900

A driving force behind the building of the Lynn & Fakenham railway line was the Revd. Joseph Lloyd Brereton of Little Massingham. Supporters of the project used to meet at his rectory in the 1870s. As a result of their endeavours the line was built from Lynn to Massingham and the Massingham railway station and line was opened on 16 August 1879. Later the line was extended and continued onto Fakenham opening on 16 August 1880.

This is a view of the station some thirty years after the trains first ran and a prominent feature is the criss-cross fencing which was found all over the Midland & Great Northern Joint Railway.

This was abbreviated to (M&GN), interpreted by many as meaning the Muddle & Get Nowhere Railway. Massingham was also the only station between South Lynn and Fakenham to have a footbridge. When the line was closed in the 1960s the main ticket office and waiting rooms and the stationmaster's house were converted into two houses.
