= Edward Waymouth Reid =

British physiologist

Edward Waymouth Reid FRS (11 October 1862, Canterbury – 10 March 1948, Edinburgh) was a British physiologist.

Born the fourth son of James, Reid, F.R.C.S.E., E. Waymouth Reid was educated at Sutton Valence Grammar School and then matriculated in 1879 at Cavendish College, University of Cambridge, where he graduated B.A. in 1883. At St Bartholomew's Hospital in 1885 he qualified M.B. and M.R.C.S. and was an assistant electrician there. At St Mary's Hospital he was a demonstrator in physiology from 1885 to 1887 and a lecturer in physiology from 1887 to 1889.

At the early age of twenty-seven he was appointed to the newly established chair of physiology in University College, Dundee, where he joined a body of highly gifted men who held teaching posts in the recently formed College affiliated to the University of St. Andrews. Waymouth Reid served the University for forty-six years, and after his retirement in 1935 the University of St. Andrews conferred upon him an honorary degree of LL.D.

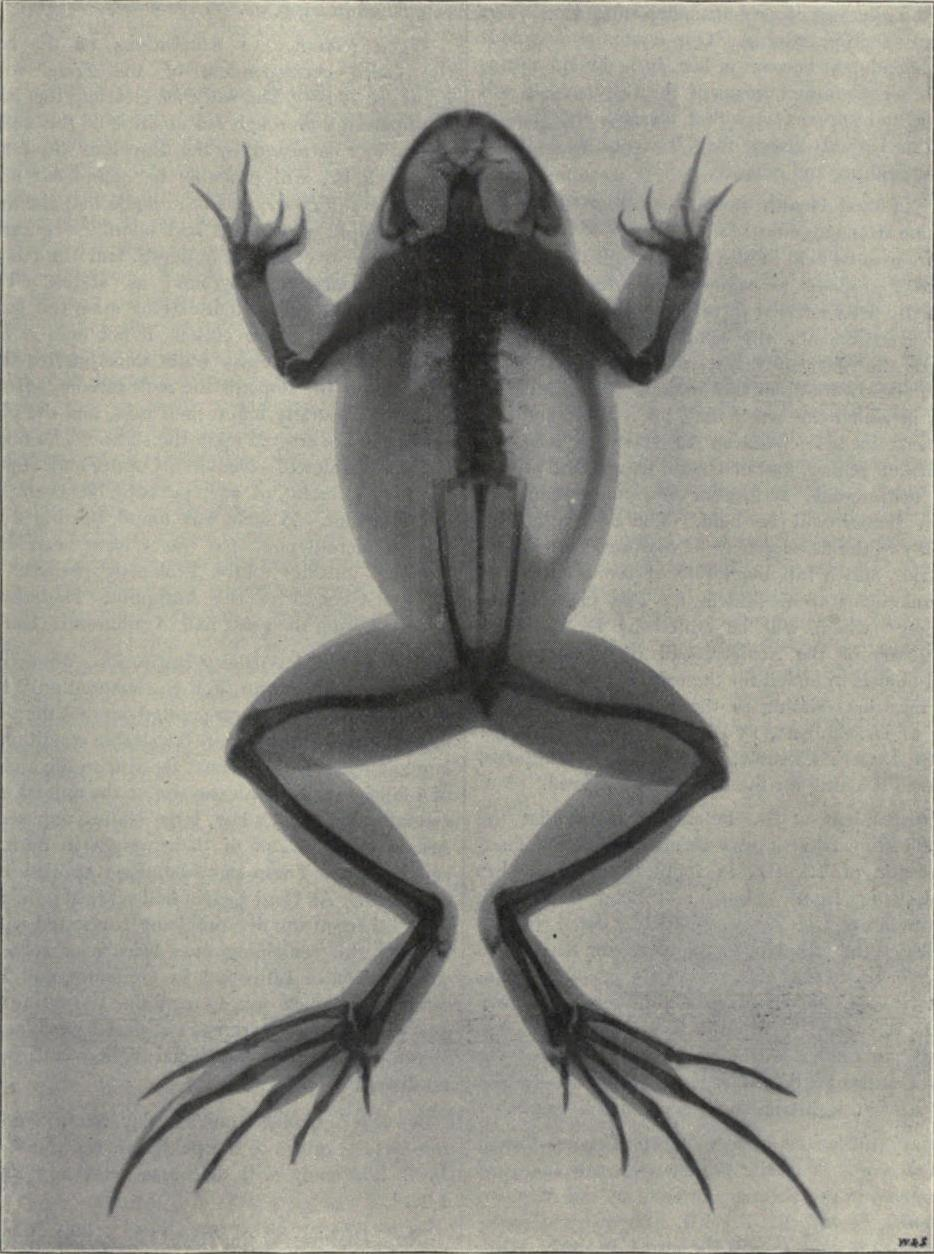
X-ray photograph of a frog by Reid and Johannes Kuenen, published in Nature, vol. liii. p. 419, 5 March 1896

While at Dundee he performed early experiments with x-rays with the Dutch physicist Johannes Kuenen.

Waymouth Reid was elected F.R.S. in 1898 and graduated Sc.D. in 1904 from Downing College, Cambridge. He was Dean of the Medical Faculty of the University of St Andrews.

From 1887 to 1905 Reid at St Mary's and Dundee was an active research worker on subjects dealing with physical and electrical phenomena associated with living tissue. At St Mary's with Waller he investigated electrical activity in the excised mammalian heart, published in the Philosophical Transactions of the Royal Society, 1887. Reid invented a recording osmometer, and at Dundee investigated secretion and absorption and the processes of diffusion, osmosis and filtration in the passage of materials across surfaces.

Reid's work in the early 1900s on active transport across biological membranes was not fully appreciated until the 1950s.

Reid was apparently the first to use everted segments of intestine for absorption studies. ... In 1902 Reid demonstrated the importance of NaCl in absorption. ... This pioneer in studies on epithelial transport was in many ways far ahead of his contemporaries in the field, yet his work was not appreciated.

Under the alias Herr Doktor Bimstein Pumpduluder, Reid used his laboratory at University College to make sweets to be sold in the Dundee Student's Union to raise money for the college's playing field fund.

== Selected publications ==
- with Augustus D. Waller: "On the action of the excised mammalian heart". Philosophical Transactions of the Royal Society of London B. 178: 215–256. 1887. doi:10.1098/rstb.1887.0010.
- Reid EW (1890). "Osmosis experiments with living and dead membranes". The Journal of Physiology. 11 (4–5): 312–351, 400–2 to 400–11. doi:10.1113/jphysiol.1890.sp000334. PMC 1514231. PMID 16991949.
- Reid EW (1892). "Report on experiments upon "absorption without osmosis."". British Medical Journal. 1 (1624): 323–326. doi:10.1136/bmj.1.1624.323. PMC 2419556. PMID 20753544.
- "The electromotive properties of the skin of the common eel". Philosophical Transactions of the Royal Society of London B. 184: 335–365. 1893. doi:10.1098/rstb.1893.0004.
- "The process of secretion in the common eel". Philosophical Transactions of the Royal Society of London B. v. 185, part 1: 319–354. 1894. doi:10.1098/rstb.1894.0008.
- with Fred J. Hambly: Reid, E. Waymouth; Hambly, Fred. J. (1895). "On transpiration of carbon dioxide through the skin of the frog". The Journal of Physiology. 18 (5–6): 411–424. doi:10.1113/jphysiol.1895.sp000576. PMC 1514657. PMID 16992270.
- Reid, E. Waymouth (1895). "Electrical phenomena during movements of the iris". The Journal of Physiology. 17 (6): 433–438. doi:10.1113/jphysiol.1895.sp000550. PMC 1514651. PMID 16992196.
- with J. S. Macdonald: Macdonald JS, Reid EW (1898). "Electromotive changes in the phrenic nerve. A method of investigating the action of the respiratory centre". The Journal of Physiology. 23 (1–2): 100–111. doi:10.1113/jphysiol.1898.sp000716. PMC 1516533. PMID 16992474.
- Reid EW (1901). "Intestinal absorption of maltose". The Journal of Physiology. 26 (6): 427–435. doi:10.1113/jphysiol.1901.sp000843. PMC 1540490. PMID 16992556.
- Reid EW (1901). "Transport of fluid by certain epithelia". The Journal of Physiology. 26 (6): 436–444. doi:10.1113/jphysiol.1901.sp000844. PMC 1540484. PMID 16992557.
- Reid EW (1905). "Osmotic pressure of solutions of hæmoglobin". The Journal of Physiology. 33 (1): 12–19. doi:10.1113/jphysiol.1905.sp001106. PMC 1465656. PMID 16992792.
