= Cavendish College, Cambridge =

Public hostel of the University of Cambridge

Coordinates: 52.1862°N 0.1365°E

Cavendish College
- Public hostel
- University of Cambridge
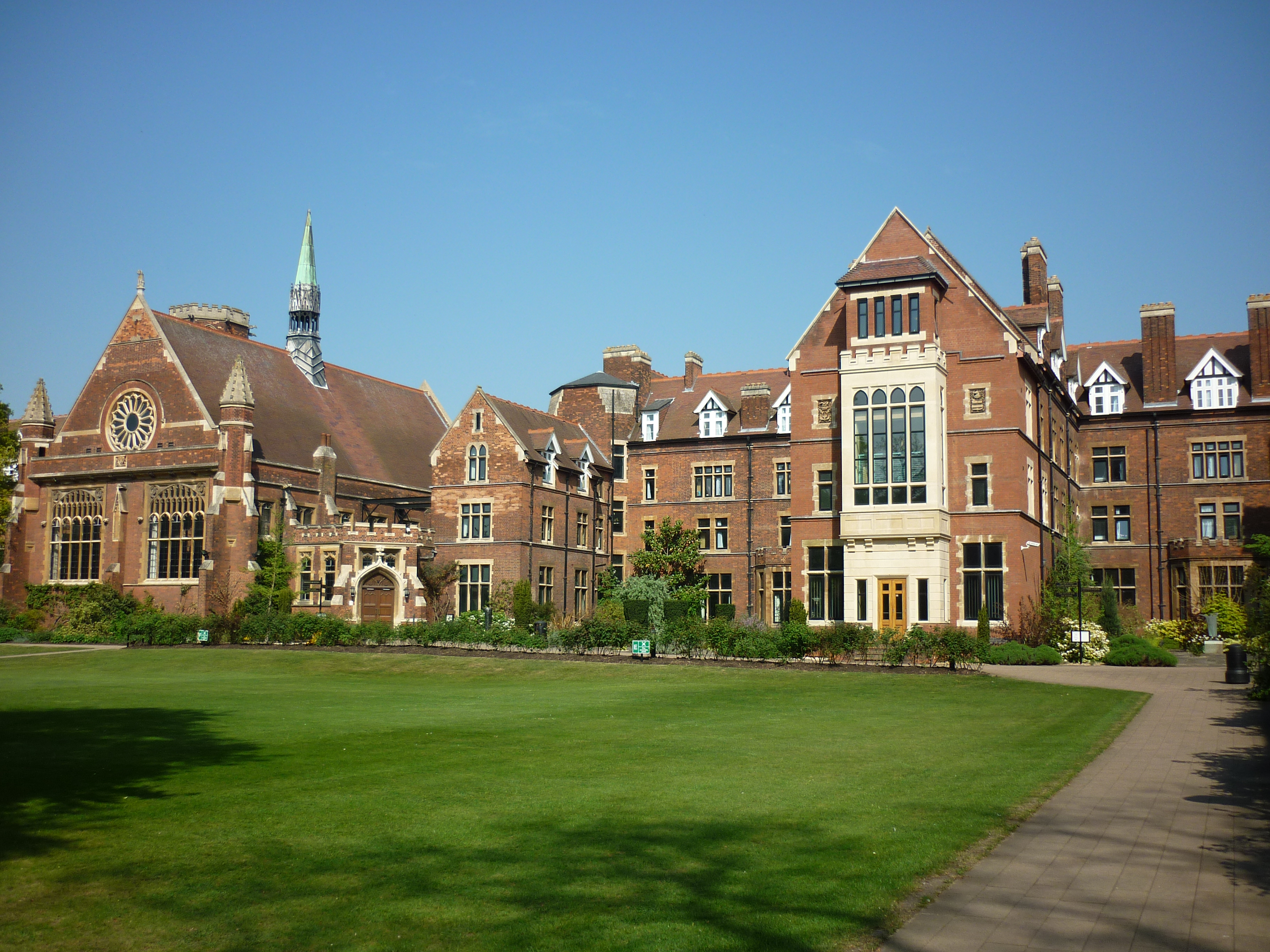
- Cavendish College buildings, now part of Homerton College
- Founder: Joseph Lloyd Brereton
- Founded: 1873
- Closed: 1892

Cavendish College, Cambridge was a public hostel of the University of Cambridge, active from 1873 to 1892.

Its former buildings now house Homerton College, Cambridge.

== History ==
=== Founding ===
It was founded by the British clergyman, educational reformer and writer Joseph Lloyd Brereton with the intention of connecting the county school system with the universities. Brereton described his scheme in his book County Education. After an unsuccessful attempt at Oxford, he founded it at Cambridge in 1873.

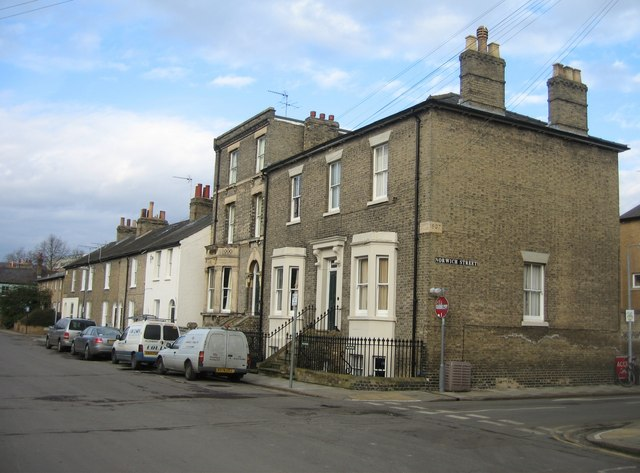
Norwich House, first home of the college

Brereton had suggested the name of Arnold College, after Thomas Arnold who had been his headmaster at Rugby School, but in the end the college was named after William Cavendish, 7th Duke of Devonshire, who was the chancellor of the university and the biggest funder of the new college.

The college opened in 1873 at Norwich House, Panton Street.

Cavendish was not recognised as a full college by the university; along with its contemporary Selwyn College, it was recognised as a public hostel of the university, students in residence being considered non-collegiate students but eligible for university degrees. The undergraduates were younger than was customary, and the cost of board and tuition, which was covered by an inclusive charge of eighty guineas a year, was much lower than in the established colleges.

=== Move to Hills Road ===
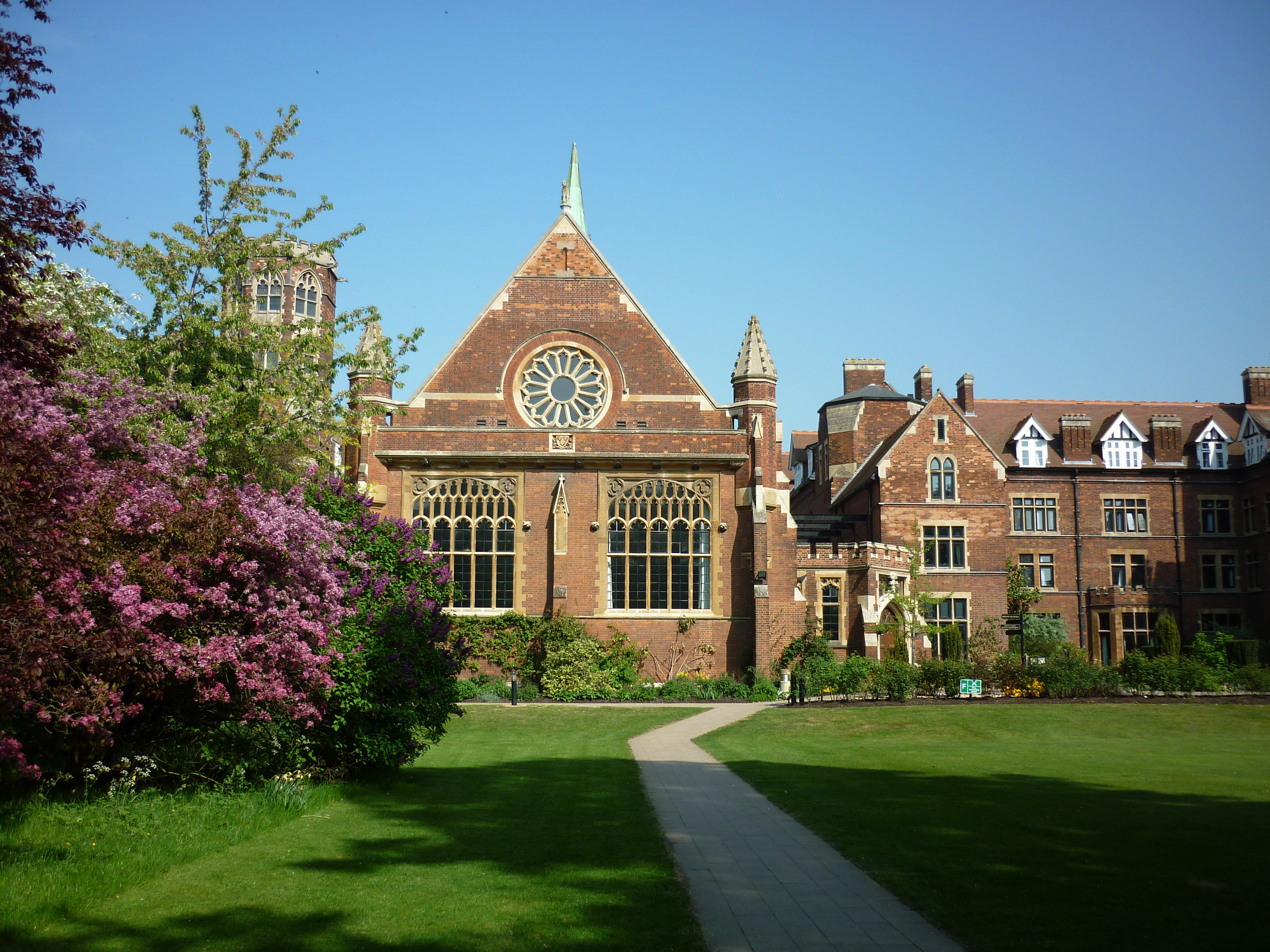
Cavendish College buildings including the tower, left

In 1876, the college purchased a site on Hills Road, from Trinity College and commissioned the architectural firm of Giles and Gough to design buildings for the new site, completed between 1876 and 1878.

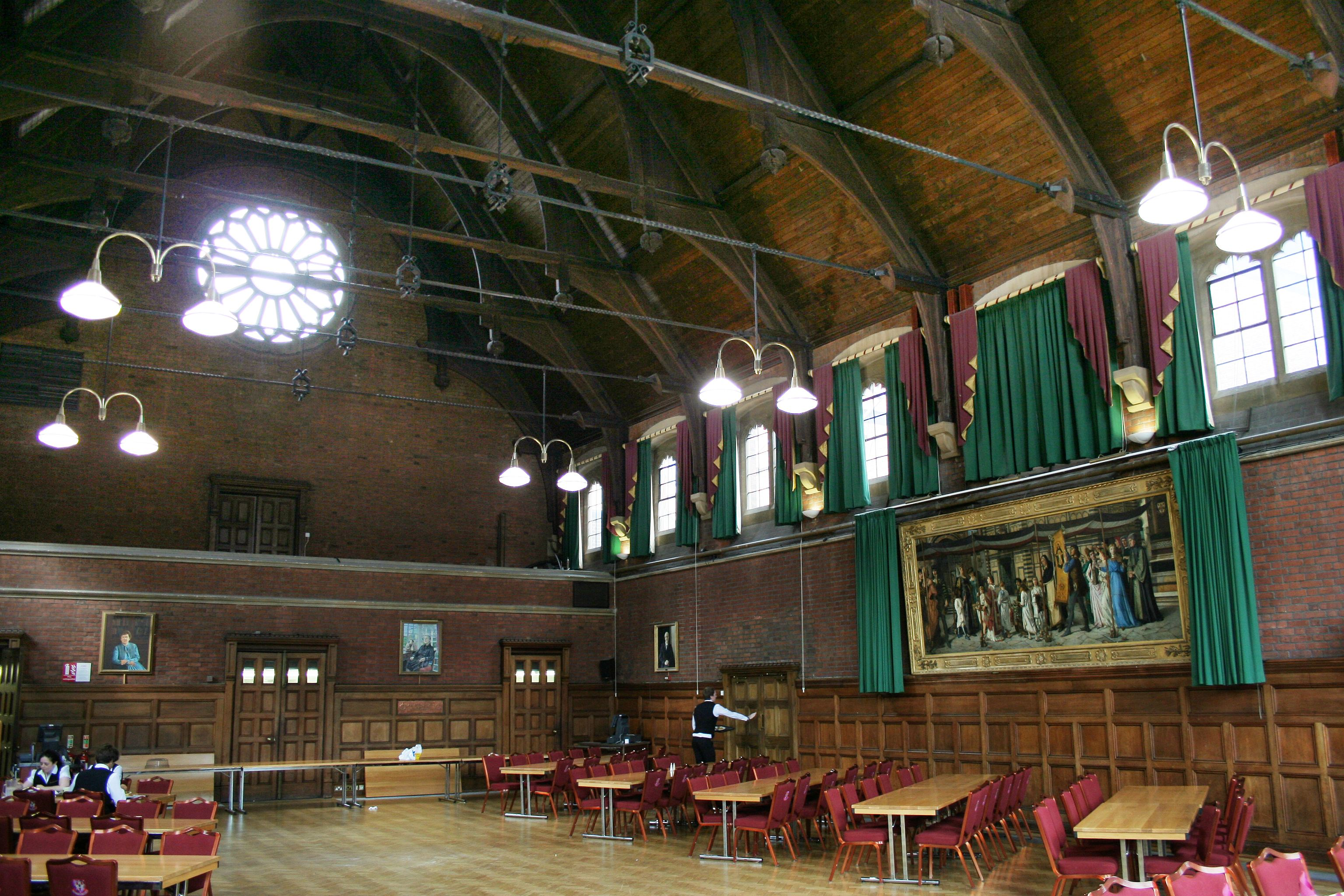
The Great Hall (1889)

The original buildings were constructed in the Gothic Revival style, using a combination of red Suffolk brick and Bath stone dressings. Though Brereton had published in 1874 an extensive plan of the proposed college, the buildings at the time of opening were significantly more spartan, lacking important facilities including a hall.

Several years later, Cambridge architect William Wren designed additions to the eastern end of the college buildings in the Neo-Gothic style.

The Great Hall was constructed in 1889, and was at the time the largest college hall in Cambridge. It features a hammer-beam roof, American walnut panelling, a gallery, rose windows and a flèche.

=== Demise ===
The venture received educational and ecclesiastical support. However, the proprietary principle was not welcomed by some, and the public schools withheld their recognition. Other factors were the distance of the college from the centre of Cambridge, (more than 1 mile), and inferior accommodation. The scheme proved financially unsuccessful, and the college was dissolved in 1892.

The buildings and furnishings were sold in 1895 to the Congregational Board of Education to house Homerton College, a teacher training college until then based in Homerton, East London. The college was initially called Homerton New College at Cavendish college, but this was soon simplified to Homerton College, Cambridge. In 2010, Homerton College finally became a full college of Cambridge University.

== Notable people ==
- Joseph Lloyd Brereton – founder
- Albert Moulton Foweraker, artist – student (1890)
- William Leslie Poole, father of Uruguayan football – student
- Edward Waymouth Reid, British physiologist – student (1879-1883)
- John Turner, archdeacon of Basingstoke – student
- William Henry Whitfeld, mathematician and bridge expert – tutor and lecturer
- P. L. Hunt, 1882 & 1883, Boat Race coxswain
