= George Macdonald (malariologist) =

Professor of tropical hygiene

George Macdonald (22 June 1903 – 10 December 1967) was a British physician who was Professor of Tropical Hygiene at the London School of Hygiene & Tropical Medicine. His research concentrated primarily on malaria, its epidemiology and control. He was the author of many papers on the mathematical analysis of the transmission of tropical infections and the author of The Epidemiology and Control of Malaria, published in 1957.

From his observations in the field, Macdonald developed concepts covering the mathematical modelling of the transmission of vector-borne tropical diseases and then applied the results to the eradication of the disease. He was early in perceiving the value of computer analysis in this area.

Macdonald developed the concept of the basic reproduction rate to quantitatively understand the transmission of malaria. He proposed that if this rate is less than 1, the disease will eventually die out in a population because, on average, an infectious person will transmit to fewer than one other susceptible person. If it is greater than 1, then the disease will spread. This is now commonly known as the R number.

In Sri Lanka in the 1930s he devised an automatically flushing siphon for antimalarial drainage. It worked by collecting slow-moving water and flushing it out all at once, thereby killing the mosquito larvae.

The George Macdonald Medal was first awarded in 1972 and has been awarded every 3 years thereafter to recognise outstanding contributions to tropical hygiene. The medal is awarded jointly by the London School of Hygiene & Tropical Medicine and the Royal Society of Tropical Medicine and Hygiene.

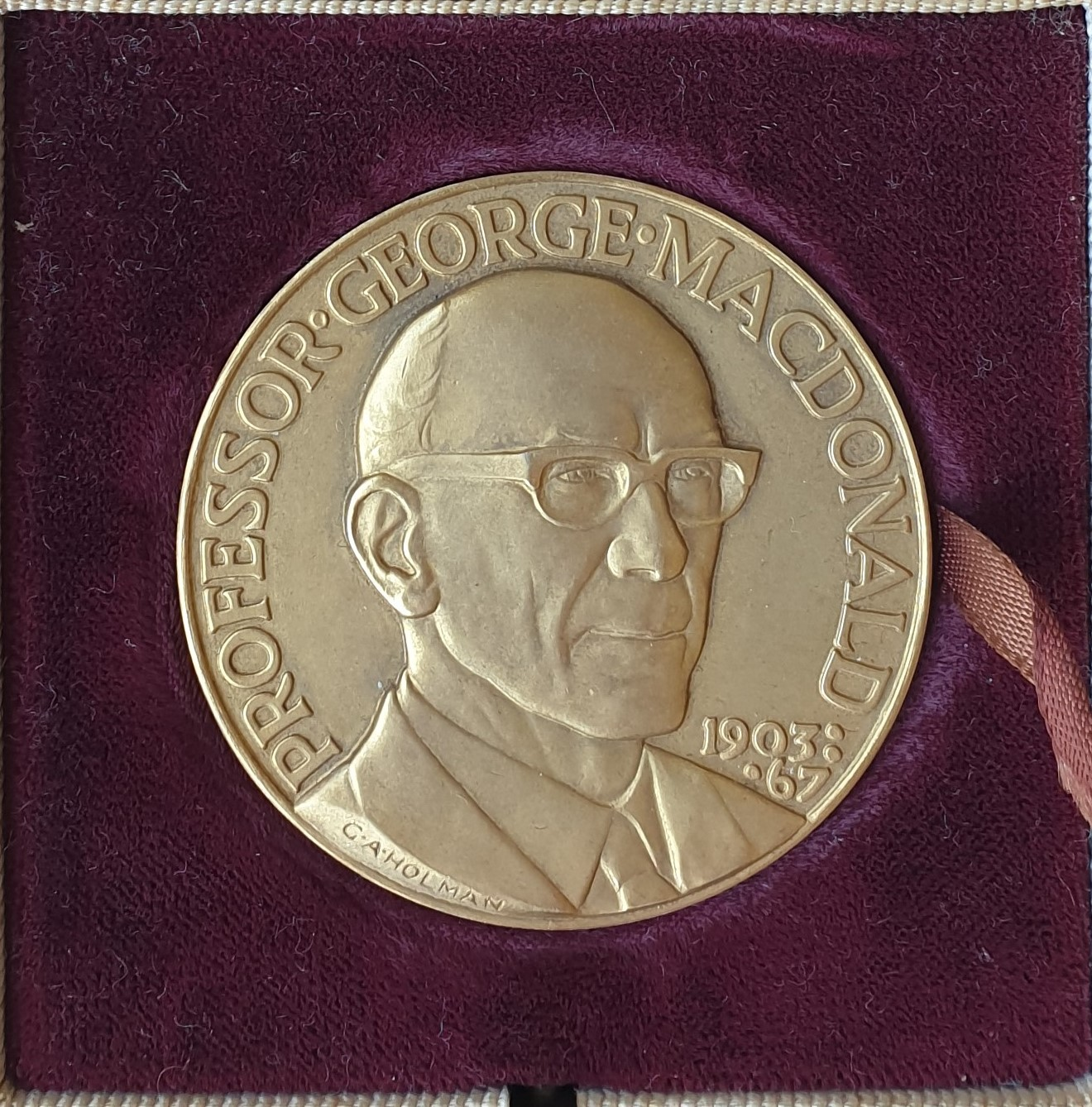
George Macdonald Medal

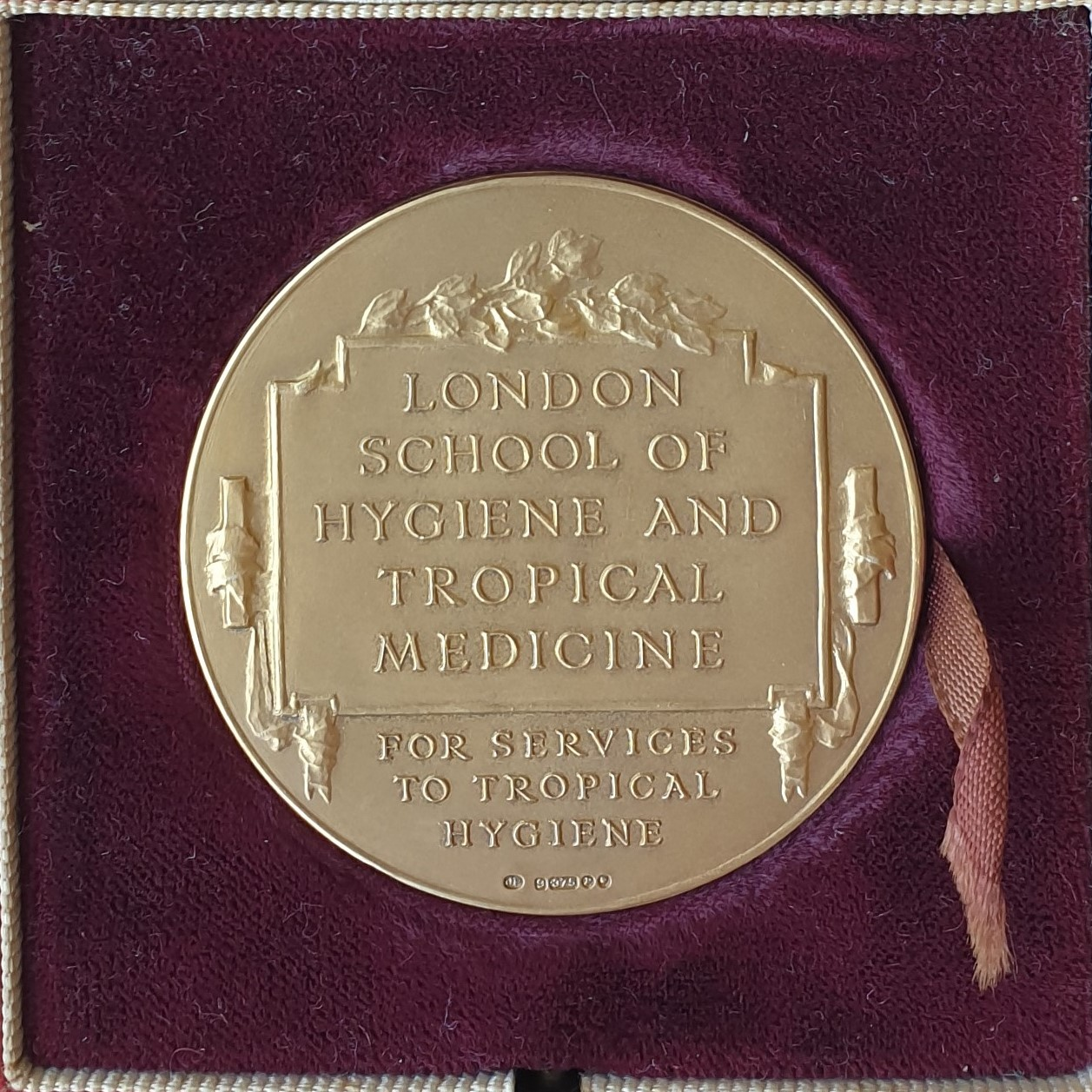
George Macdonald Medal

== Early life and education ==
Macdonald was born in Sheffield. His father, John Smyth Macdonald FRS, was a physician and professor of physiology at the University of Sheffield, and then at the University of Liverpool. His mother was Mary Catherine, daughter of Donald Stewart, a Scottish farmer.

Macdonald was educated first at King Edward VII School in Sheffield, and, when the family moved to Liverpool, at the Liverpool Institute. He then entered the medical school of the University of Liverpool, graduated MB ChB in 1924 and, already attracted by a career in the tropics, took the DTM in the same year.

== Career ==
In 1925 Macdonald was appointed research assistant at the Sir Alfred Jones Research Laboratory in Freetown, Sierra Leone, where during the next four years he carried out studies on the effects of malaria in African children. In 1932 he took the post of medical officer for the Mariani Medical Association in Assam. He held this appointment until 1937. During the second world war Macdonald had a distinguished service. He was, in turn, commanding officer of No. 1, No. 2 and No. 3 Malaria Field Laboratories in the Middle East and Central Mediterranean, with a final rank of Brigadier.

Macdonald became director of the Ross Institute in 1945. He was appointed CMG in 1953, and elected a Fellow of the college in 1955. In 1954 he received the Darling Foundation Medal and prize from the World Health Assembly in Geneva for his studies on epidemiology and control of malaria.

Ronald Ross and Macdonald are credited with developing a mathematical model of mosquito-borne pathogen transmission. A systematic historical review suggests that several mathematicians and scientists contributed to development of the Ross-Macdonald model over a period of 70 years. The Ross-Macdonald model has since played a central role in the development of research on mosquito-borne pathogen transmission and strategies for mosquito-borne disease prevention.

Macdonald continued working even after being diagnosed with lung cancer in 1966, submitting his last paper only two weeks before dying.

== Personal life ==
In 1932, Macdonald married Mary Hetherington (1907 – 1987), daughter of civil engineer Roger Gaskell Hetherington. Together they had three children.
