= Leonard Jan Bruce-Chwatt =

Polish malariologist and medical entomologist

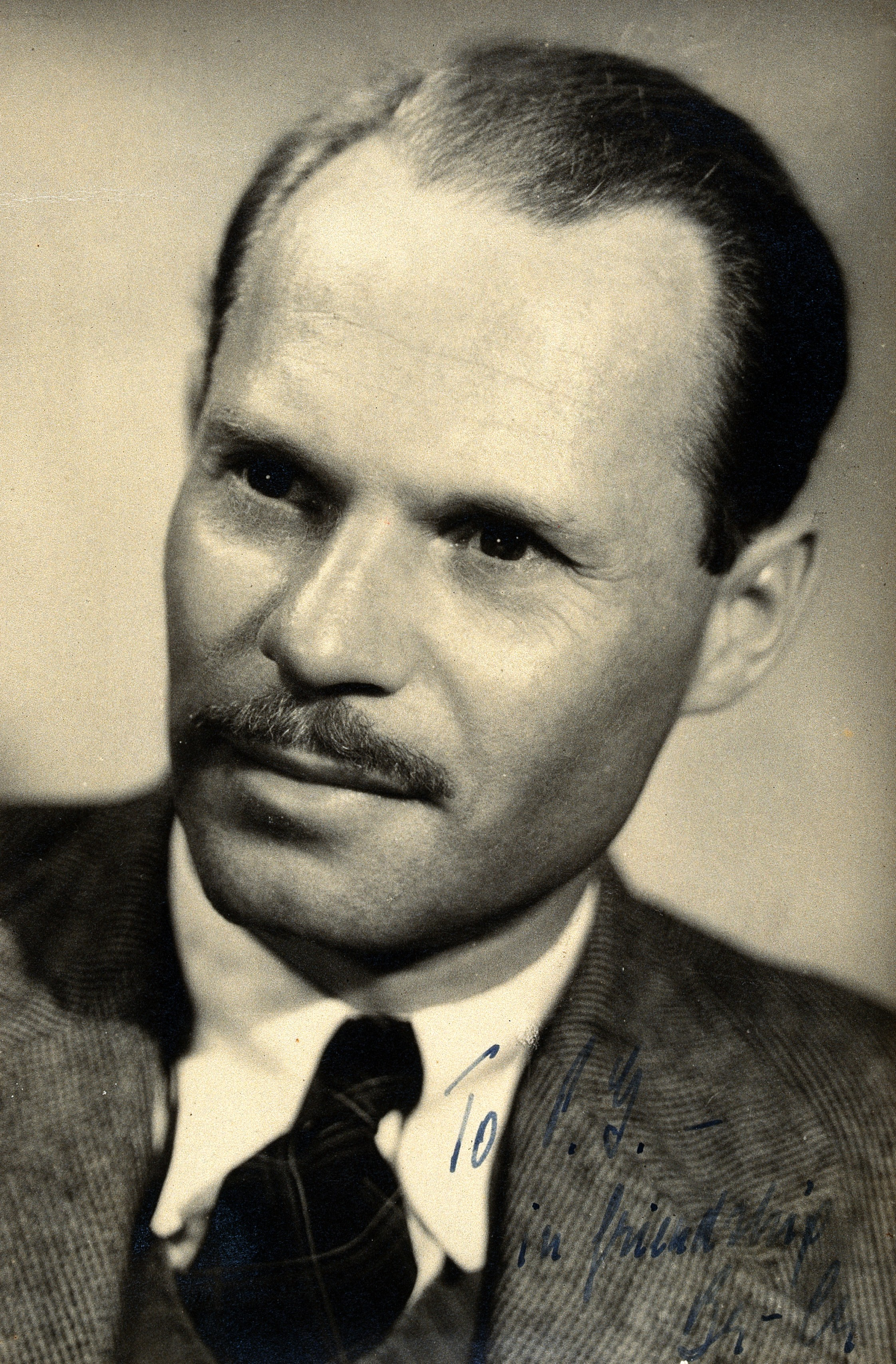
- Born: Leonard Jan Chwatt; 9 June 1907; Łódź
- Died: 18 May 1989 (aged 81)
- Occupations: Medical doctor and professor
- Awards: Officer of the British Empire 1953, Companion of the Order of St Michael and St George 1976, Darling Foundation Prize 1971, George Macdonald Medal 1981.

Academic work
- Discipline: Medicine
- Institutions: London School of Hygiene and Tropical Medicine
- Main interests: Malariology, medical entomology

Leonard Jan Bruce-Chwatt (born Leonard Jan Chwatt on 9 June 1907 in Łódź and died 18 May 1989) was a Polish medical doctor, malariologist and medical entomologist who worked extensively on malarial research in Nigeria with the British colonial medical service, and later with the World Health Organization and the London School of Hygiene and Tropical Medicine.

== Biography and career ==
Bruce-Chwatt was educated first in Saint Petersburg, and later in Warsaw where he obtained his degree in medicine with distinction in 1930. He spent two years as RMO in the Polish Army. He then took a postgraduate degree in microbiology and serology in 1933, after which he moved to France for two years to pursue a diploma in colonial medicine. While serving with the Polish Army in Britain, Bruce-Chwatt earned a Diploma in Tropical Medicine and Hygiene and the Duncan Medal at the London School of Hygiene and Tropical Medicine.

In 1942, he was transferred to the Royal Army Medical Corps and sent to No. 7 Malaria Field Laboratory in Nigeria. He was demobilised in 1946, and began working as a medical entomologist with the Colonial Medical Service in Nigeria. In 1948, Chwatt became a British subject, married Joan Margaret Bruce and added her name to his own.

Over the course of his career, Bruce-Chwatt published numerous works on malaria.

== Honours ==
Bruce-Chwatt received the Officer of the British Empire during the 1953 Coronation Honours, and the Companion of the Order of St Michael and St George during the 1976 Birthday Honours. In 1971, Bruce-Chwatt was conferred with the Darling Foundation Prize awarded by League of Nations. He also received the George Macdonald Medal awarded by the Royal Society of Tropical Medicine and Hygiene and London School of Hygiene and Tropical Medicine in 1981.

== Selected publications ==
- Bruce-Chwatt, Leonard Jan (1985). Essential Malariology. Wiley. ISBN 978-0-471-82831-0.
- Bruce-Chwatt, Leonard Jan; Zulueta, Julian de (1980). The Rise and Fall of Malaria in Europe: A Historico-epidemiological Study. Oxford University Press. ISBN 978-0-19-858168-0.
- Bruce-Chwatt, Leonard Jan (1952). "Malaria in African Infants and Children in Southern Nigeria". Annals of Tropical Medicine & Parasitology. 46 (2): 173–200. doi:10.1080/00034983.1952.11685522. ISSN 0003-4983. PMID 12986705.
- Bruce-Chwatt, L. J. (1981). "Alphonse Laveran's Discovery 100 Years Ago and Today's Global Fight against Malaria". Journal of the Royal Society of Medicine. 74 (7): 531–536. doi:10.1177/014107688107400715. ISSN 0141-0768. PMC 1439072. PMID 7021827.
- Bruce-Chwatt, L.J. (1979). "Man against Malaria: Conquest or Defeat". Transactions of the Royal Society of Tropical Medicine and Hygiene. 73 (6): 605–617. doi:10.1016/0035-9203(79)90002-6. ISSN 0035-9203. PMID 120043.
- Bruce-Chwatt, L. J. (1965), "Paleo-Genesis and Paleo-Epidemiology of Primate Malaria", Bulletin of the World Health Organization, vol. 32, pp. 363–387, doi:10.1016/b978-1-4832-2913-3.50184-2, ISBN 978-1-4832-2913-3, PMC 2555232
- Bruce-Chwatt, L. J. (23 January 1954). "Problems of Malaria Control in Tropical Africa". BMJ. 1 (4855): 169–174. doi:10.1136/bmj.1.4855.169. ISSN 0959-8138. PMC 2093191. PMID 13106513.
- Bruce-Chwatt, Leonard J. (1951). "Malaria in Nigeria". Bulletin of the World Health Organization. 4 (3): 301–327. ISSN 0042-9686. PMC 2554075. PMID 14886718.
- Bruce-Chwatt, L. J.; Bruce-Chwatt, J. M. (1950). "Antimalarial Drugs in West Africa". BMJ. 2 (4669): 7–14. doi:10.1136/bmj.2.4669.7. ISSN 0959-8138. PMC 2037999. PMID 15426791.
- Bruce-Chwatt, Leonard Jan (1986). Chemotherapy of Malaria. World Health Organization. ISBN 978-92-4-140127-2.
- Bruce-Chwatt, L. J. (7 March 1964). "Changing Tides of Chemotherapy of Malaria". BMJ. 1 (5383): 581–586. doi:10.1136/bmj.1.5383.581. ISSN 0959-8138. PMC 1813891. PMID 14088310.
- Bruce-Chwatt, L. J. (1956). "Chemotherapy in relation to possibilities of malaria eradication in tropical Africa". Bulletin of the World Health Organization. 15 (3–5): 852–862. ISSN 0042-9686. PMC 2538287. PMID 13404464.
- Bruce-Chwatt, L. J. (1977). "John Macculloch, M.D., F.R.S. (1773–1835) (The precursor of the discipline of malariology)". Medical History. 21 (2): 156–165. doi:10.1017/S0025727300037686. ISSN 0025-7273. PMC 1081947. PMID 325305.
