= Albert Moulton Foweraker =

British artist (1873–1942)

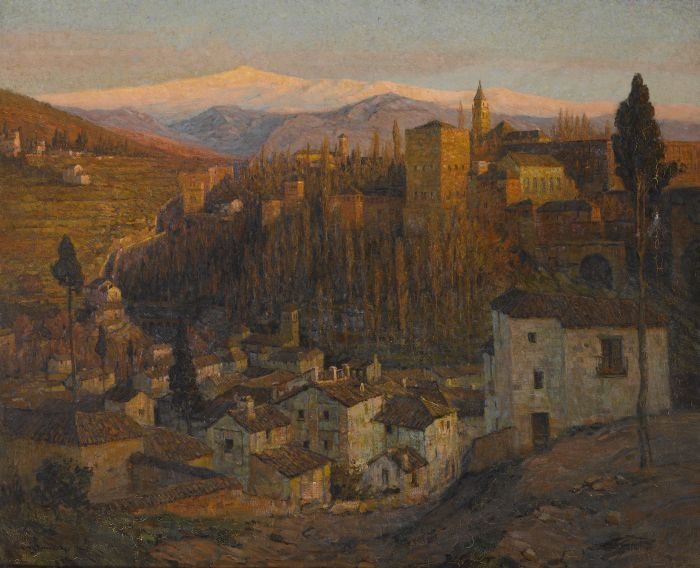
Afterglow – The Alhambra and Sierra Nevada, Granada. 1905.

Albert Moulton Foweraker (7 July 1873 – January, 1942) was an English painter.

He was educated at Exeter Cathedral School, was an exhibitioner at Cavendish College, Cambridge in 1890, and went on to Christ's College, from where he obtained his Degree in Applied Science in 1893. He obtained First Class Honours, City & Guilds in 1896, and was a qualified Milling Engineer. He was also sometime Demonstrator In Science at Exeter Technical College. He was married in July 1897 to Annie Triphina Coles.

In 1898, he took up art professionally, and between that year and 1912, he exhibited his work regularly. He was made a member of the Royal Society of British Artists in 1902, and sent 52 paintings to exhibitions at their Galleries in Pall Mall during these years. He also exhibited at several important provincial galleries. He originated an exhibition of works by modern painters at Exeter, which developed into the Devon And Cornwall Fine Art Society.

He moved from Exeter to Lelant, Cornwall in 1902, and travelled frequently to Spain, especially the South during the early 1900s and in the 1920s. He also visited Southern France and North Africa, and produced many paintings from these travels. He was also a very prolific local artist, and painted a very large number of landscapes and local scenes from Devon, Cornwall and, of course, Dorset, to which County he moved in the mid-1920s, living at Northbrook Road, Swanage for many years.

He was fascinated by the effects of certain light on the landscape, particularly moonlight, as his paintings show. He is known for his use of the colour blue, and his moonlight paintings of people carrying lanterns and light shining from windows are much sought after.

He appeared to have been very interested in the RMS Titanic disaster of 1912, particularly in the Enquiries subsequently held, apparently suspecting suppression of certain information. In 1940 he made a Codicil to his Will, leaving various documents and papers relating to these matters, to the British Museum. The artist died in January 1942 at Swanage, at the age of 68, and is buried in Godlingston Cemetery, Ulwell, Swanage.

A common source of confusion with his paintings is that his signature can easily be read by the unwary as 'Doweraker', and in this guise 'A.M. Doweraker, fl.1920s–1940s' can be found in auction records.
