= Joseph Lloyd Brereton =

British educational reformer and writer (1822–1901)

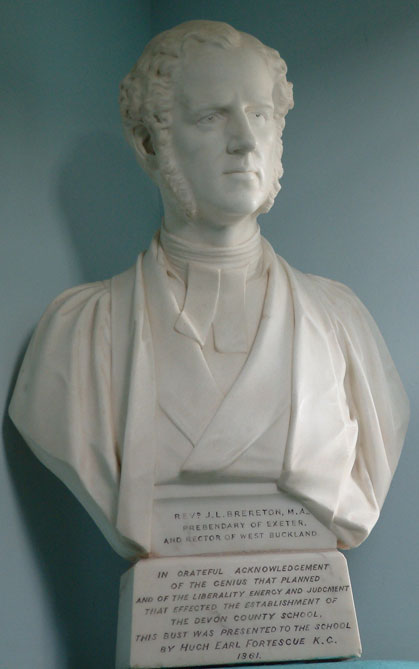
Marble bust sculpted in 1861 by E.B. Stephens, on staircase of Memorial Hall, West Buckland School. Inscribed: "Rev'd J.L. Brereton, MA, Prebendary of Exeter and Rector of West Buckland. In grateful acknowledgement of the genius that planned and of the liberality energy and judgement that effected the establishment of the Devon County School this bust was presented to the school by Hugh, Earl Fortescue KG 1861"

Prebendary Joseph Lloyd Brereton (19 October 1822 – 15 August 1901) was a British clergyman, educational reformer and writer, who founded inexpensive schools for the education of the middle classes. Through his work and writings he influenced others to make similar foundations.

== Life ==
Brereton was born on 19 October 1822 at Little Massingham Rectory, near King's Lynn. He was third son of eleven children of Charles David Brereton (1790–1868), for forty-seven years rector of Little Massingham and his wife Frances (1796–1880), daughter of Joseph Wilson of Highbury Hill, Middlesex, and Stowlangtoft Hall, Suffolk. His father was an influential writer on poor law and agricultural questions between 1825 and 1828. Joseph's youngest brother, Robert Maitland Brereton, became a railway and civil engineer.

Brereton was educated at Islington proprietary school under John Jackson, afterwards bishop of London, and at Rugby under Thomas Arnold (1838–41). He gained a scholarship at University College, Oxford, in 1842, obtained the Newdigate Prize for a poem on the Battle of the Nile in 1844, and graduated B.A. in 1846 and M.A. in 1857. During his university education he was granted leave on account of illness. It was during this time he started employment as a private tutor with wealthy families, a practice he continued for many years.

Taking holy orders, Brereton held curacies at St Edmund's in Norwich, St Martin's-in-the-Fields, and St James's, Paddington (1847–50). While in London and with the help from his family, he edited a quarterly journal, The Anglo Saxon, which contained articles celebrating English culture and history for consumption in England and throughout the English speaking world. The popular author, Martin Farquhar Tupper was a frequent contributor. The journal promoted and reported on the grand celebration held on 25 October 1849 at Wantage of the millennium of the birth of Alfred the Great.

From 1852 to 1867 Brereton was rector of West Buckland, Devon, and in 1867 he took over from his father as rector of Little Massingham, where he remained for the rest of his life. In 1882 Brereton, with his brother, General John Alfred Brereton, was severely injured in a railway accident between Cambridge and Ely, which interrupted for some years his public work.

On 25 June 1852 Brereton married Frances, daughter of William Martin, rector of Staverton, Devon, and they had five sons and six daughters. Brereton died on 15 August 1901, and was buried in Little Massingham churchyard.

== Educational reform ==
Brereton's interest in educational reform among the agricultural and middle classes was stimulated by his father's studies of the Poor Laws and also by the influence of Thomas Arnold at Rugby School. Having been appointed rector of West Buckland in North Devon, with the encouragement and practical assistance of Hugh Fortescue, 2nd Earl Fortescue (d.1861), KG, lord-lieutenant of Devonshire, and his son Viscount Ebrington (d.1905), Brereton established in 1858 at West Buckland the farm and county school to supply education suitable for farmers' sons. Earl Fortescue owned much land in the parish but was not patron of the living, and therefore not responsible for Brereton's appointment. The Earl founded at the same time Filleigh School, near his mansion of Castle Hill, Filleigh. The school was soon renamed the "Devon County School", and in 1912 was renamed "West Buckland School". The object was to provide a fee-paying boarding school, with liberal and religious education, at fees which whilst large enough to cover the cost of board and tuition and to return a fair interest on capital invested, were at a fraction of what was charged by the public schools. In recognition of his work in Devon, in 1858 Brereton was made prebendary of Exeter Cathedral.

In contrast to the work of Nathaniel Woodard, who also founded schools for the middle classes, Brereton's foundations were not high church. Indeed, although religious instruction and worship were part of the curriculum at Brereton's schools the low church approach was less discouraging to non-conformist elements of the middle classes. Secondly, the main feature of the scheme was that the county rather than the diocese should be the unit of the area of organisation, and that upon the county basis the whole scheme of national education should be co-ordinated. Finally, Brereton did not rely wholly on endowments as did Woodard, but he operated mainly on a proprietary basis, forming companies of investors to raise the capital needed to found his schools.

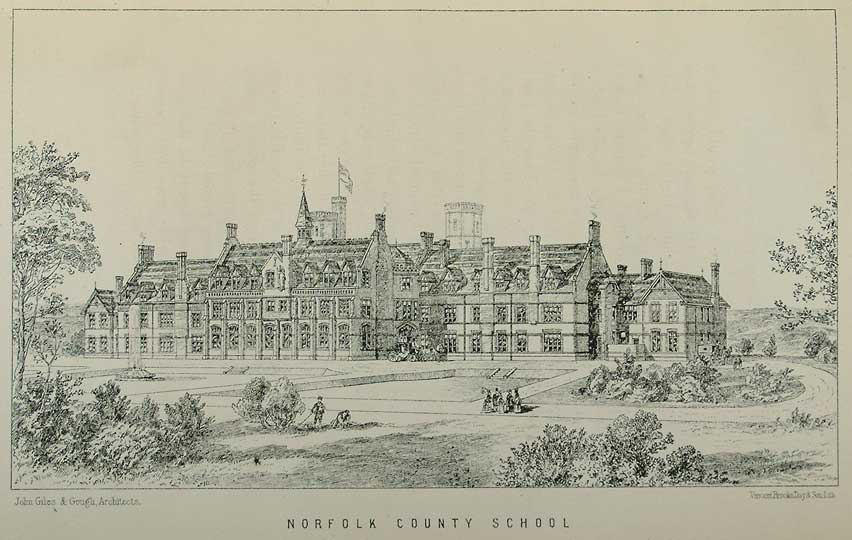
Architects' plan for the Norfolk County School

Brereton's removal to Little Massingham in 1867 as rector led in 1871 to the foundation there of the Norfolk County School, which was transferred in 1874 to North Elmham. His next step was to connect the county school system with the universities. After an unsuccessful attempt at Oxford, he founded at Cambridge in 1873 a 'county' college, which was named Cavendish College, after the chancellor of the university, the Duke of Devonshire. Brereton described his scheme in his book County Education. Cavendish College was instituted as a public hostel of the university, students in residence being eligible for a university degree. The undergraduates were younger than was customary, and the cost of board and tuition, which was covered by an inclusive charge of eighty guineas a year, was much lower than in the established colleges. The venture received educational and ecclesiastical support. However, the proprietary principle was not welcomed by some, and the public schools withheld their recognition. Other factors were the distance of the college from the centre of Cambridge, (more than 1 mile), and inferior accommodation. The scheme proved financially unsuccessful, and the college was dissolved in 1892. The buildings were sold in 1895 and were used as a training college, Homerton College, for women teachers, which in 2010 finally became a full college of Cambridge University.

In 1881, Brereton formed the Graduated County Schools Association, whose aim was the establishment of self-supporting schools and colleges for girls and women, the last step in his practical scheme for a national system of county education. The association collapsed in 1887 leaving Brereton with large debts.

A contributing factor in the failure of some of his schools was the agricultural depression in the 1880s and the competition which arose as a result of the increasing responsibility for secondary education being assumed by counties, e.g. the Elementary Education Act 1891 (54 & 55 Vict. c. 56) provided some access to low cost secondary education. A key feature of all Brereton's schemes was the proprietary principle. Significant foundation funds were to be raised from investors rather than from charitable endowments. In the end this was a millstone too great for some schools to sustain in times of hard competition.

== Rural affairs and railways ==
Brereton was interested in agricultural questions, and while in Devon founded in 1854 the Barnstaple Farmers' Club, of which he was president. Later he was president of the west Norfolk chamber of agriculture. In north Devon his interest in rural prosperity was marked by many permanent works of reform and improvement, and by his efforts he helped to bring the railway from Taunton to Barnstaple, a line known as the Devon and Somerset Railway and afterwards absorbed into the Great Western Railway. Similar efforts in west Norfolk led to the Lynn and Fakenham Railway, which was subsequently extended to Norwich, Cromer, and Yarmouth.

Joseph Lloyd Brereton in 1868 – portrait by George Richmond

== Portraits ==
A portrait of Brereton as a boy with his maternal grandfather, Joseph Wilson, was painted by Sir David Wilkie. A second portrait, by George Richmond, with a companion portrait of his wife, was exhibited at the Royal Academy in 1868; both are now at West Buckland School, where there is also a bust of Brereton was placed there in 1861 by Hugh, Earl Fortescue.

== Publications ==
His writings, beside pamphlets, and sermons, include:

- County Education: a Contribution of Experiments, Estimates and Suggestions (1874)
- The Higher Life, (1874), a blank verse exposition of New Testament teaching
- Musings in Faith and other Poems, (1885)

== Sources ==
- The Alfred Jubilee, The Times (29 October 1849, p 8)
- Obituary, The Times, (17 August 1901)
- Owen, W.B.: in Dictionary of National Biography, (1912)
- Honey, J.R.deS.: Tom Brown's Universe, (1977)
- Searby, P.: in Oxford Dictionary of National Biography, (2004)
