= George Macdonald Medal =

The George Macdonald Medal is jointly awarded by the Royal Society of Tropical Medicine and Hygiene and the London School of Hygiene & Tropical Medicine "to recognise outstanding contributions to tropical hygiene."

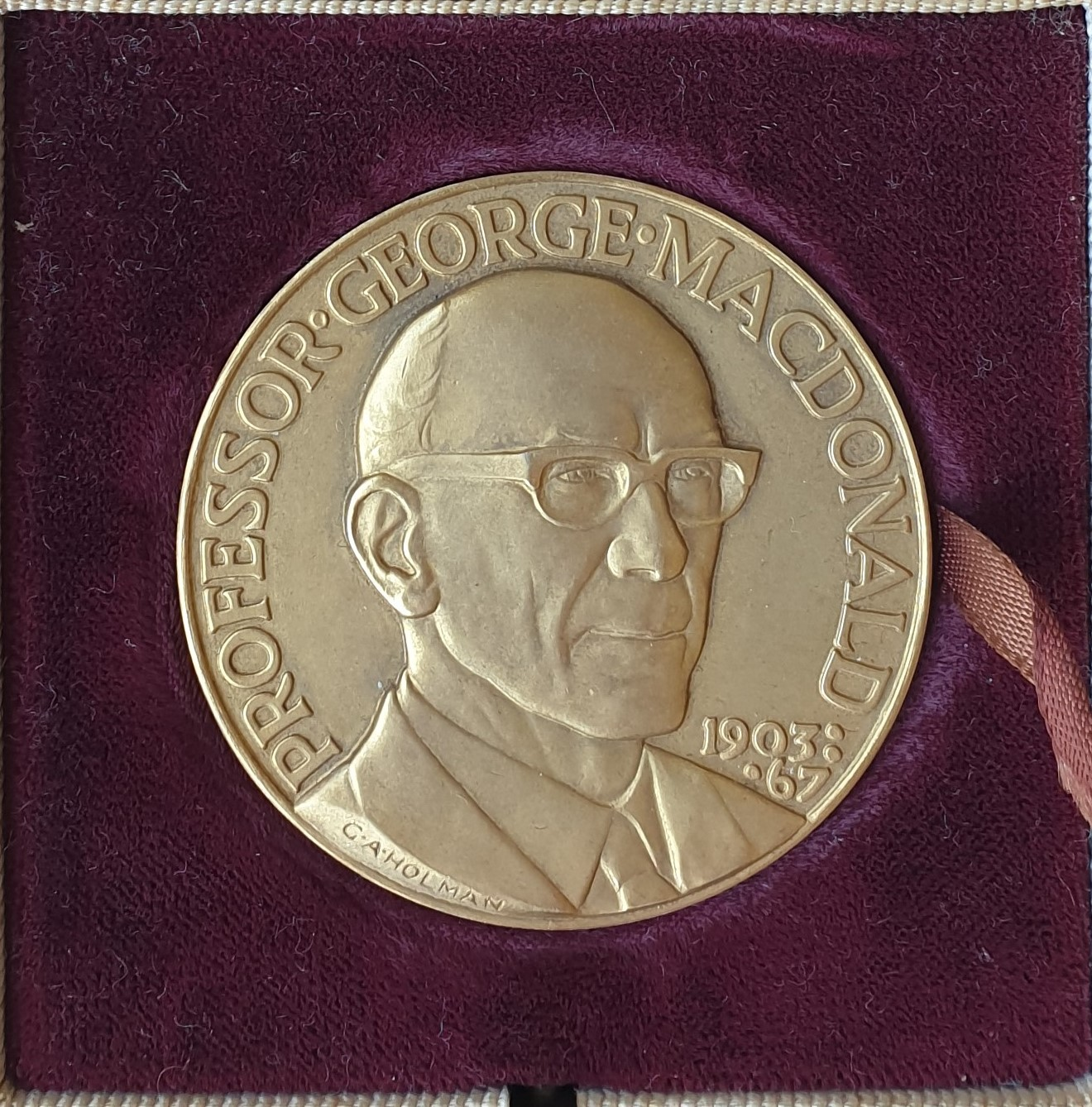
Front side of medal

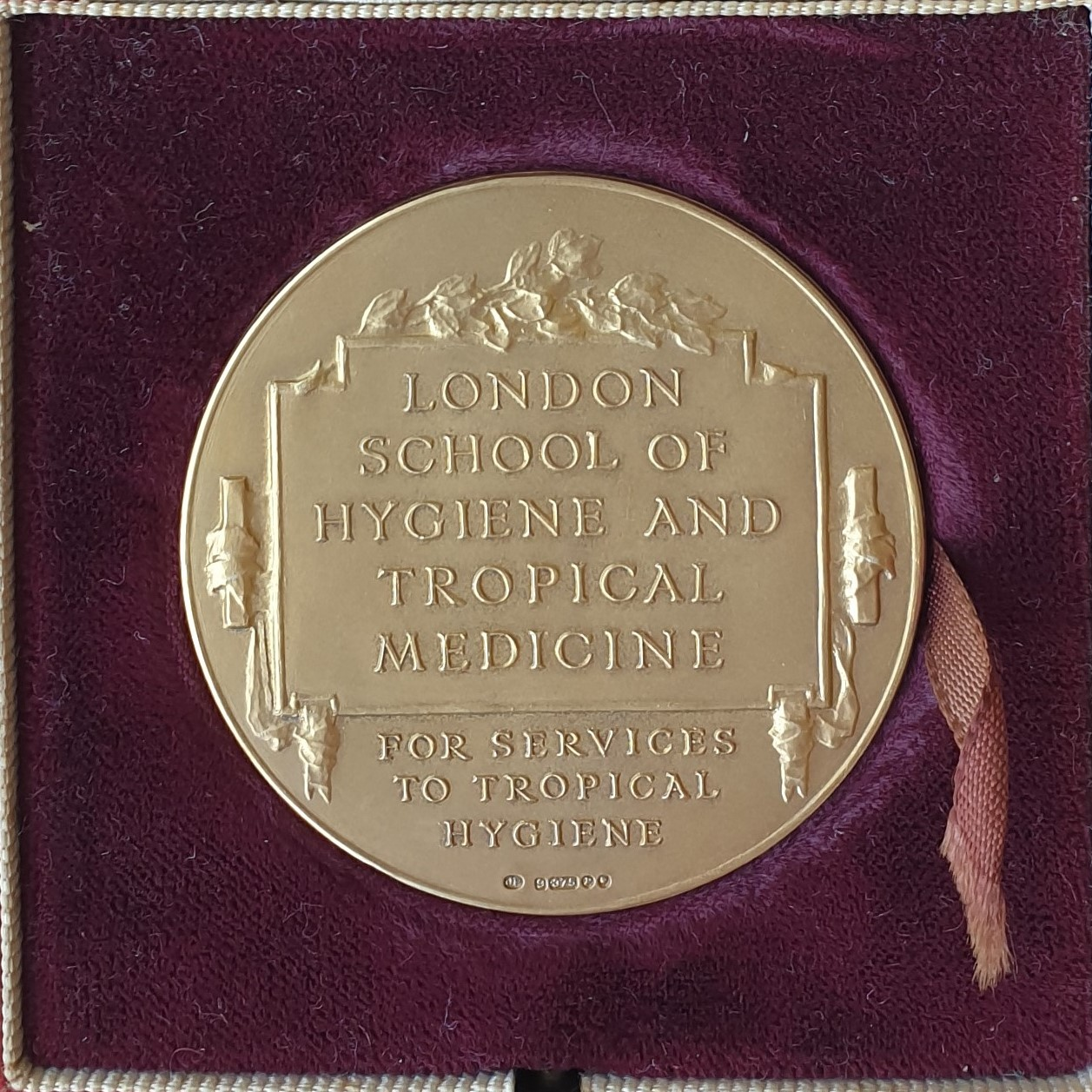
Front side of medal

The award was established in 1972 following the death of George Macdonald in 1967.

It is awarded every three years and is given to "those in their mid-career or senior leaders in their field."

== Recipients ==
Source: RSTMH

- 2020 Alex Ezeh and Sarah Cleaveland
- 2017 Ann Ashworth and Betty Kirkwood
- 2014 Richard Hayes and Rosanna Peeling
- 2011 David Mabey and Robert Snow
- 2008 Sandy Cairncross
- 2005 Allen Foster
- 2002 Anthony Harries
- 1999 Andrew M. Tomkins
- 1996 David J. Bradley
- 1996 Christopher F. Curtis
- 1993 Tore Godal
- 1990 Michael P. Alpers and C. E. Gordon Smith
- 1987 Kelsey A. Harrison
- 1984 Arnoldo Gabaldon
- 1984 John Waterlow
- 1981 Peter Jordan
- 1978 Leonard J. Bruce-Chwatt
- 1975 Donald A. Henderson
- 1972 George Davidson
