= West Buckland School =

Public school in Devon, England

- West Buckland, Devon; England

Information
- Type: Public School; Independent school
- Motto: Read and Reap
- Established: 1858
- Founder: Joseph Lloyd Brereton
- Headmistress: Helen Lowe
- Enrollment: 600 (approx.)
- Website: www.westbuckland.com

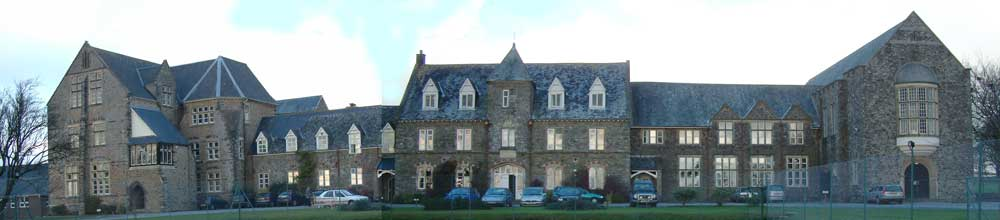

West Buckland School is a private co-educational day and boarding school in West Buckland, Devon in the English public school tradition. It comprises a senior school, preparatory school, and a nursery. It is a relatively high performing school in Devon. It was one of eight schools shortlisted for 'Boarding School of the Year' in the TES Independent School Awards 2019, a category won by Cottesmore School.

The school facilitates 640 pupils of whom around 140 board; 16% of students are international. The day pupils and weekly boarders are drawn from a wide area of North Devon and beyond, many using the large school bussing operation in collaboration with local coach operators.

== History ==
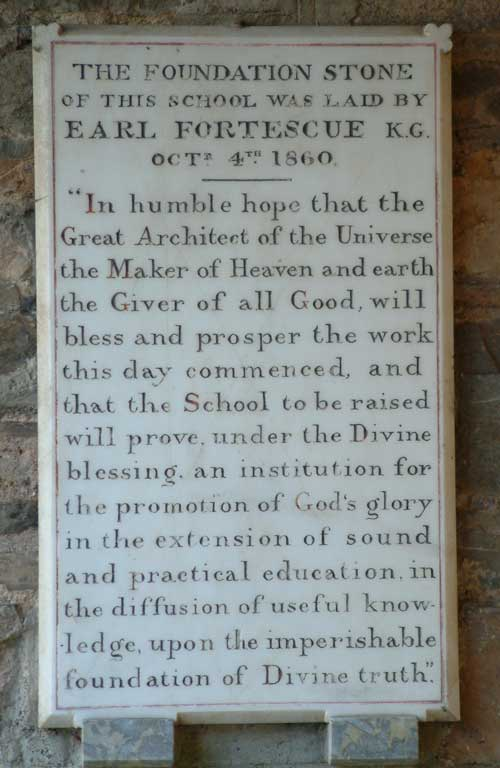

West Buckland School was founded as the Devon County School in 1858 by Rev. J.L. Brereton to provide a public school education for sons of farmers and the middle class. The foundation stone of the Gothic-style buildings was laid in October 1860 by Earl Fortescue, who had provided land and other support for the school.

Under the first headmaster, J.H. Thompson, numbers rose to 150 by 1876 and then declined as a consequence of agricultural depression and competition from other schools.

In the winter of 1912/13 the school was renamed West Buckland School.

During the 1950s it received increasing support from the Devon County Educational authority and became a direct grant school. In 1976, when direct grants were abolished, it finally became a fully independent school.

== Expansion and development ==
Since 2008, the school has expanded its facilities, that year saw the completion of a sports hall behind the nineteenth century complex. In April 2010, the 150 Building opened, a combination of buildings containing modern art, design and technology workshops; a theatre which replaced an old theatre; an assembly space for the prep school and a quadrangle. In Autumn 2015, the 'Michael Morpurgo' library opened. In the building there is also the head of sixth form office; an English and economics classroom; the school library and a work area with computers for pupils. Also opened in 2015 was Parkers, a sixth form boarding house for boys and girls, with a downstairs lounge and kitchen for the use of day pupils as well.

West Buckland School has a four-house system, the houses being:

- Brereton
- Courtenay (named after the Earls of Devon)
- Fortescue
- Grenville (named after the ancient Grenville family, lords of the manor of Bideford)

Numerous inter-house competitions are held throughout the school year in music, drama and sport culminating in Sports Day held during the final week of the summer term. Points are awarded according to how well houses do in each competition. Whichever house has amassed the largest number of points after Sports' Day wins the coveted Southcomb Shield. The Grenville enjoyed an eight year winning streak keeping the shield from 2013 to 2020. After a one year hiatus due to Covid, the Courtenay won the competition in 2022. The Grenville regained the shield in 2023 after a magnificent performance on Sports Day. In 2024, the Grenville held onto the shield beating Courtenay by only one point. On Speech Day 2025, the Grenville were hailed as the victors for the third year in a row securing a coveted "Threepeat."

The origins of the shield are detailed in an extract from West Buckland School 1858–1958. The First Hundred Years. A Review of a Century recorded by Friends and Pupils.

On July 31, 1917, there fell in action, E.H. Southcomb, then a Lieutenant in the Manchester Regiment. He was for many years a very cheerful member of the Brereton House, no great athlete but always ready to play his part to the best of his ability. On leaving West Buckland he went, by his father's wish, to Shrewsbury for two years, and then entered a bank, where he remained till war broke out. On his death it was found that he had left a legacy (£10 10s. 0d.) to the Sports Fund of his first school, and somewhat late it has at last been decided to perpetuate his memory by a Shield which will be held by the House which obtains the chief athletic cups in the School year, which starts in September. For this purpose, each of the Challenge Cups carries a definite mark. The allocation of marks for each cup was not an easy matter and even now the values may require re-adjustment in 1924. The Headmaster formed a committee consisting of Messrs. Corless, Taylor and Walton, and the list as issued by them will hold good at any rate till July, 1924. The winning House will hold the shield, which will be hung over their dining tables, and will also take the right of the line on ceremonial parades.

== Fees ==
Annual fees in 2024: Day £9,090 – £18,420; Boarding £24,480 – £38,340 pa.

== Alumni ==
- Brian Aldiss (1925–2017), author of science fiction and general fiction
- John Ashworth (1940-2025), former Director of the London School of Economics
- R. F. Delderfield (1912–1972), playwright and novelist. His book To Serve Them All My Days was set at a school based on West Buckland School.
- Jonathan Edwards (born 1966), triple jump world record holder, Olympic Games gold medalist and presenter
- George Friend, English professional footballer
- Harold Gimblett (1914–1978), former Somerset and England cricket player
- Bertie Hill (1927–2005), equestrian, Olympic Games gold medalist
- Harold Hilton (1869–1942), golf, won The Open Championship 1892 1897 Amateur Championship 1900 1901 1911 1913 US Amateur 1911 a record unmatched and member of the World Golf Hall of Fame
- Claudia Huckle, British operatic mezzo-soprano
- Steve Ojomoh (born 1970), former Bath and England rugby player
- Craig and Jamie Overton (twins, born 1994), current Somerset and England Lions cricket players
- Harry Packer (1868-1946), former Newport and Wales rugby player, who managed the British Isles team on their 1924 tour of South Africa
- General Satyawant Mallanna Shrinagesh (1903-1977), Chief of the Defence Staff Indian Army, Governor of Assam
- Rob Stirzaker (born 2001), radio presenter and Big Brother 2026 contestant
- Victor Ubogu (born 1964), former Bath and England rugby player
- Tim Wonnacott (born 1953), antiques expert and television presenter
