= Great Massingham =

Village and civil parish in Norfolk, England

Coordinates: 52.774324°N 0.664797°E

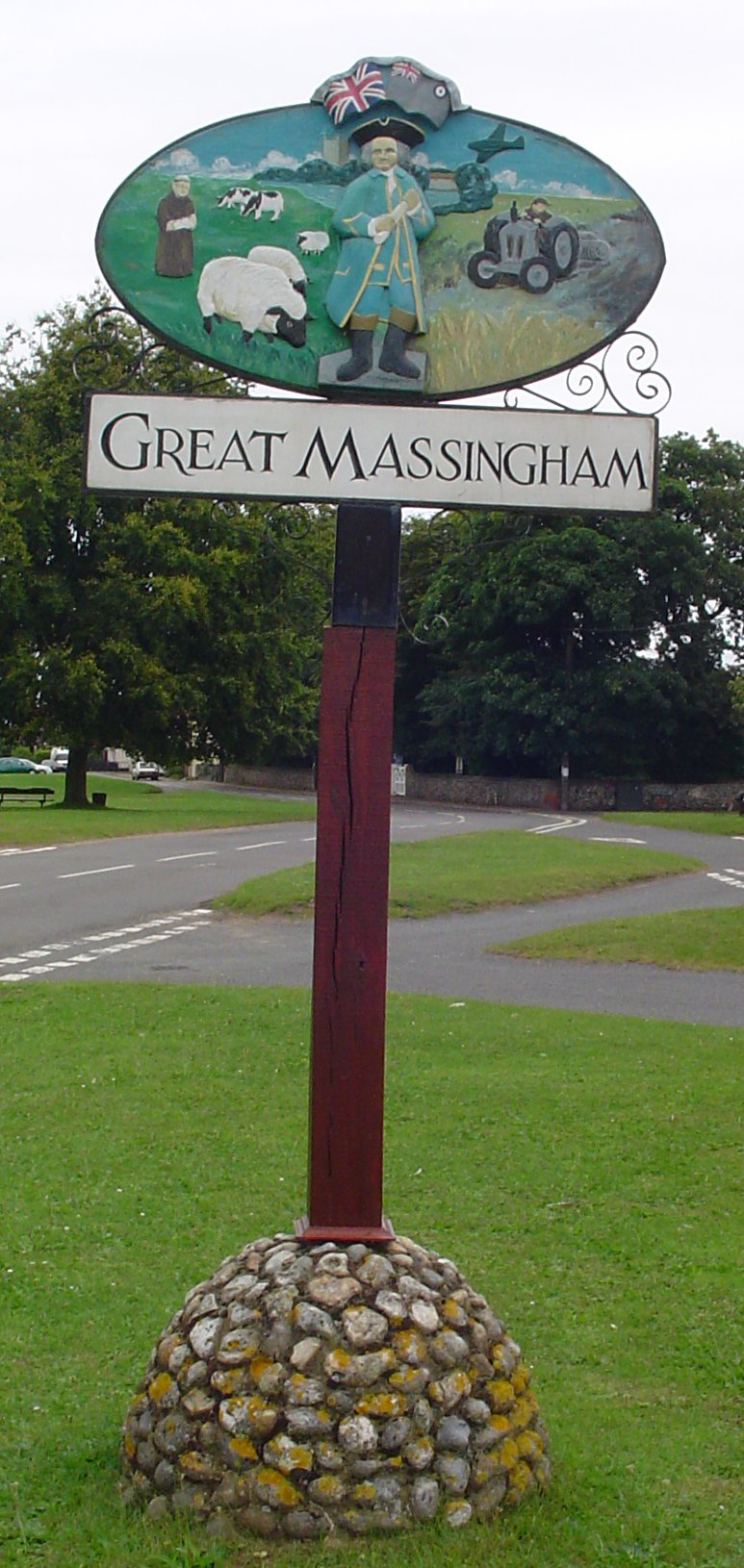
- Great Massingham village sign

- Location within Norfolk
- Area: 6.63 sq mi (17.2 km^{2})
- Population: 963 (2021 census)
  - Density: 145/sq mi (56/km^{2})
- OS grid reference: TF798229
- District: King's Lynn and West Norfolk
- Shire county: Norfolk
- Region: East
- Country: England
- Sovereign state: United Kingdom
- Post town: KING'S LYNN
- Postcode district: PE32
- Dialling code: 01485
- Police: Norfolk
- Fire: Norfolk
- Ambulance: East of England
- UK Parliament: North West Norfolk

Great Massingham is a village and civil parish in the English county of Norfolk.

Great Massingham is located 11 miles (18 km) east of King's Lynn and 28 miles (45 km) north-west of Norwich.

== History ==
Great Massingham's name is of Anglo-Saxon origin and derives from the Old English for the village of Maessa's people.

In the Domesday Book, Great and Little Massingham are recorded together as a settlement of 117 households in the hundred of Freebridge. In 1086, the village was divided between the estates of King William I, William de Warenne, William d'Ecouis, Count Eustace of Boulogne, Roger Bigod of Norfolk, Reginald, son of Ivo and Eudo, son of Spirewic.

In 1260, an Augustinian Priory was founded in the village which was eventually dissolved in 1583.

Massingham Railway Station opened in 1879 as part of the Lynn and Fakenham Railway. The station closed in 1966.

During the Second World War, RAF Great Massingham was built in the parish as a satellite airfield for RAF West Raynham and was used by RAF Bomber Command until 1958.

== Geography ==
According to the 2021 census, Great Massingham has a population of 963 people which shows an increase from the 902 people listed in the 2011 census.

== St. Mary's Church ==
Great Massingham's parish church is dedicated to Saint Mary and dates from the Fifteenth Century. St. Mary's is located within the village on Station Road and has been Grade I listed since 1960. The church no longer holds Sunday services and is part of the Gayton, Grimston and Massingham Benefice.

St. Mary's Churchtower was rebuilt in the Victorian era at the same time as a sparing restoration of the church. The church also features a Thirteenth Century font, Fifteenth Century benches and late-medieval stained-glass windows.

== Amenities ==
Great Massingham Primary is part of the Great Massingham & Harpley Church of England Federation. The headteacher is Ms. H. Myhill.

There is also a tennis and multisports facility in the village.

The Dabbing Duck pub has stood in the village since 1890, and was originally known as the Rose & Crown. The pub remains open for food & accommodation.

== Governance ==
Great Massingham is part of the electoral ward of Massingham with Castle Acre for local elections and is part of the district of King's Lynn and West Norfolk.

The village's national constituency is North West Norfolk which has been represented by the Conservative's James Wild MP since 2010.

== War Memorial ==
Great Massingham War Memorial is a tall portland stone Greek cross which was opened in 1920 by a Colonel McNeil. The following names were added after the First World War:

Rank	Name	Unit	Date of death	Burial/Commemoration
CSt.	Charles W. Allcock	HMS Africa	11 Mar. 1916	Dalmeny Cemetery
Sgt.	John W. Skipper	9th Bn., Yorkshire Regiment	9 Oct. 1916	Dernancourt Cemetery
Cpl.	Horace Warnes	1/5th Bn., Norfolk Regiment	19 Apr. 1917	Jerusalem Memorial
Cpl.	Albert W. Whitby	1/5th Bn., Norfolk Regt.	28 Aug. 1915	Helles Memorial
Cpl.	Ernest C. Jarvis	7th Bn., Rifle Brigade	18 Aug. 1916	Thiepval Memorial
LCpl.	Herbert Bird	101st Coy., Labour Corps	17 May 1918	St. Sever Cemetery
LCpl.	Peter Powley	8th Bn., Norfolk Regiment	19 Jul. 1916	Thiepval Memorial
LCpl.	Charles E. Reader	14th Bn., Royal Warwickshire Regt.	27 Sep. 1918	Gouzeaucourt Cemetery
Pte.	Horace A. Holsey	7th Bn., Cheshire Regiment	5 Sep. 1918	St. Mary's Churchyard
Pte.	Ernest W. Powley	1/9th Bn., Durham Light Infantry	7 Feb. 1917	Hamburg Cemetery
Pte.	John W. Goll	8th Bn., East Surrey Regiment	18 Sep. 1918	Emilie Valley Cemetery
Pte.	Frank Beck	1st Bn., East Yorkshire Regiment	1 Jul. 1916	Thiepval Memorial
Pte.	George Barnes	14th Bn., Hampshire Regiment	17 Sep. 1916	Euston Road Cemetery
Pte.	Aubone H. Tooke	16th Bn., Lancashire Fusiliers	3 Apr. 1918	Quesnoy Farm Cemetery
Pte.	Sidney W. Gage	9th Bn., Norfolk Regiment	25 Mar. 1917	Vermelles British Cemetery
Pte.	Albert George	12th Bn., Norfolk Regt.	12 Oct. 1918	Underhill Farm Cemetery
Pte.	R. William Howard	12th Bn., Norfolk Regt.	8 Dec. 1917	Jerusalem War Cemetery
Pte.	Harry Sillis	2nd Bn., Royal Sussex Regiment	10 Oct. 1917	Tyne Cot
Rfn.	Thomas R. Moore (Note: Rifleman Moore drowned in an accident on Diamond Island in Burma.)	18th Bn., Rifle Brigade	15 Nov. 1916	Taukkyan War Cemetery

The following name was added after the Second World War:

Rank	Name	Unit	Date of death	Burial/Commemoration
LSgt.	Dudley Harvey	118 LAA Regt., Royal Artillery	24 Dec. 1944	Forlì Cemetery
