= West Buckland, Devon =

Village in Devon, England

Coordinates: 51.06703°N 3.920947°W

West Buckland
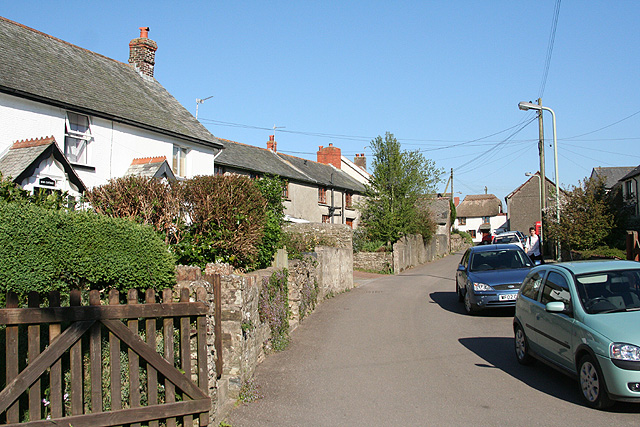
- A street in West Buckland

- Location within Devon
- OS grid reference: SS655315
- Civil parish: East and West Buckland
- District: North Devon
- Shire county: Devon
- Region: South West
- Country: England
- Sovereign state: United Kingdom
- Post town: BARNSTAPLE
- Postcode district: EX32
- Dialling code: 01598
- Police: Devon and Cornwall
- Fire: Devon and Somerset
- Ambulance: South Western
- UK Parliament: North Devon

West Buckland is a small village and former manor, now in the parish of East and West Buckland, in the North Devon district, in the county of Devon, England. South Molton is the nearest town, Barnstaple is 8 miles (13 km) west-north-west. The hamlet of Elwell lies to its north-east. In 1961 the parish had a population of 251.

== History ==
The manor was formerly part of the Fortescue Estate, owned by the Earls Fortescue of nearby Castle Hill, Filleigh. Earlier the manor together with the advowson of the church had been acquired by the influential Barnstaple merchant and MP John Delbridge (1564-1639). On 1 April 1986 the parish was abolished and merged with East Buckland to form "East and West Buckland".

== Access ==
Most travellers reach West Buckland by a steep, winding, mostly single track hill up from the North Devon Link Road (A361).

== Facilities ==
Until 2008 the village had a small post office; the post office is now held in the church on two afternoons a week, Tuesdays and Thursdays. West Buckland was one of the first villages in the country to arrange such a facility. The village has a refurbished village hall. There is no public house, but the village hall now has a licensed bar which is opened during a considerable number of social events throughout the year.

== West Buckland School ==
The village may be best known for having given its name to the adjacent co-educational independent West Buckland School: educators of, amongst others, England cricketer Harold Gimblett and British world record triple-jumper Jonathan Edwards. Despite taking the name, the school comprising its preparatory school, three boarding houses and the public school itself is located on an extensive campus about 1 km east of the village and instead it is the small parish church which draws most visitors from the local area. The daily school traffic includes a fleet of long coaches which pass through the narrow village street twice a day.

== West Buckland Festival ==
Previously, there was a thriving, annual four-day "Festival of Music, Art and Entertainment", which included both international and local performers, a very successful Art and Craft Exhibition and various workshops.

We regret to say that we no longer hold a Festival in the village.
