= Brereton (surname) =

Brereton is a surname. Notable people with the surname include:

- Alexander Picton Brereton (1892–1976), Canadian recipient of the Victoria Cross
- Ben Brereton Díaz (born 1999), Chilean footballer
- Bridget Brereton (born 1946), Trinidad and Tobago-based historian
- Cuthbert Arthur Brereton (1850–1910), British civil engineer
- Dan Brereton (born 1965), American artist and illustrator
- Dermott Brereton (born 1964), Australian rules footballer
- Ernest Le Gay Brereton (1869–1932), Australian mining engineer and academic
- Frederick Sadleir Brereton (1852–1957), British author
- Henry E. H. Brereton (1865–1957), New York politician
- Jack Brereton (born 1991), British politician
- John Brereton (disambiguation), several people

- John Brereton, 4th Baron Brereton (1659–1718), English baron in the peerage of Ireland
- John Brereton (Adventurer and clergyman) (c. 1571–c. 1632), English gentleman adventurer, clergyman, and chronicler
- John Le Gay Brereton (1871–1933), Australian poet
- John Brereton (footballer) (1935–2021), Australian footballer
- John Brereton (Irish lawyer) (1576–1629), English-born lawyer

- Joseph Lloyd Brereton (1822–1901), English educational reformer and writer
- Kevin Brereton (born 1972), Canadian singer, songwriter and record producer
- Laurie Brereton (born 1946), Australian politician
- Lewis H. Brereton (1890–1967), American military aviation pioneer
- Mocky Brereton, New Zealand rugby league footballer
- Patrick Brereton, author and academic at Dublin City University
- Paul Brereton (born 1957), Australian judge and soldier
- Robert Maitland Brereton (1834–1911), English railway engineer
- Robert Pearson Brereton (1818–1894), British engineer and colleague of Isambard Kingdom Brunel
- Thomas Brereton (1782–1831), Irish soldier, governor of Senegal
- William Brereton (disambiguation), several people

- William Brereton (fl. 1406–1432), MP for Midhurst and Chichester
- William Brereton (courtier) (d. 1536) in the privy chamber of Henry VIII
- Sir William Brereton (died 1559) (c. 1520–1559), MP for Cheshire
- Sir William Brereton, 1st Baronet (1604–1661), Parliamentary General in the English Civil War
- William Brereton, 1st, 2nd and 3rd Lords Brereton

- William Brereton, 1st Baron Brereton (1550–1630), MP for Cheshire in 1597, 1614 and 1621
- William Brereton, 2nd Baron Brereton (1611–1664), MP for Cheshire in 1661
- William Brereton, 3rd Baron Brereton (1631–1680), MP for Newton in 1659 and Bossiney 1660

- William Brereton (British Army officer) (1789–1864), colonel in the Royal Horse Artillery

- William Brereton (priest) (1726–1812), Archdeacon of Lichfield, 1782–1801

- William Brereton (planter) (died 1822), planter in British Guiana
