= F. A. A. Russell =

Australian barrister (1868–1938)

Francis Alfred Allison Russell KC (1868 – 30 October 1938) was an Australian barrister.

== History ==
Russell was born in Brighton, Victoria, the eldest son of George Alfred Russell (c. 1839 – 6 December 1926) and his wife Louisa Gertrude Russell, née Robey (c. 1847 – 29 March 1918), daughter of R. M. Robey. Russell and Robey married at Valparaíso, Chile, around 1866.

After graduating B.A. from the University of Sydney he was appointed assistant master, Sydney Grammar School.

He was called to the bar on 5 May 1897 and specialized in Australian banking law, in which he was recognised as an authority.

He was appointed King's Counsel in 1927 and served as acting District Court judge from 1928. He was chairman of several wages boards and of the Building Trades Group.

He was deputy dean of St Paul's College, Sydney and chancellor of the diocese of Goulburn.

== Other interests ==
He was a competitive golfer, a leading member of the Hunter's Hill Golf Club.

He was a director of Sydney's Daily Telegraph.

He was one of five candidates put forward by the Soldiers and Citizens Party for the multi-member seat of Ryde in the NSW state elections of March 1920, polling rather poorly.

== Family ==
Russell was twice married; first on 18 April 1899 to Julia "Dollie" Bowie Wilson, who died on 24 March 1900. Julia was a daughter of John Bowie Wilson. He married again, to Lilian Adela Maude Sophia Salter (1873–1956), on 7 October 1903, and lived at "Brackendale", Karnah-road, Turramurra, followed by Hunter's Hill, later "Holmwood", Shirley Road, Wollstonecraft. Their children include:

- Patience Allison Russell, known as Pattie, (14 December 1904 – 18 September 1961) married Ian Ross Campbell (23 March 1900 – 31 October 1997) at St James' Church, Sydney, on 26 April 1927 They had a daughter Gillian on 22 April 1928. According to a Times obituary, this marriage was dissolved after two years, and in 1967 Ian Campbell married Irene Cardamatis, who died in 1996.
- Audrey Innes Russell, born at Hunters Hill on 8 October 1906, was a popular socialite. During WWII she was ranked Flying Officer with WAAAF at No. 5 Operational Training Unit RAAF Station, Williamtown, New South Wales.
- Elsa Mary Lillian Russell (18 January 1909 – 1997) was born at Hunters Hill. She was, like her mother, a painter, served with the WAAAF at No. 5 Service Flying Training School RAAF, Uranquinty during WWII, and is remembered for her work as an unofficial war artist.
- Sybil Marguerite Russell, born July 1911, was engaged to Peter Nicholas Maine Perry (1912–2002), but remained single. She and sister Audrey were popular socialites.

He died at Bowral, New South Wales, and his remains were cremated following a service at St Thomas' Anglican Church, North Sydney, conducted by Canon Baker, assisted by Canon Garnsey, Warden of St Paul's College.

== Bibliography ==
He was author of:

- F. A. A. Russell (1897). Tennyson's Gareth and Lynette.
- F. A. A. Russell (1907). The Law Relating to Banker and Customer in Australia.
- F. A. A. Russell (1915). Industrial Arbitration in New South Wales.
- F. A. A. Russell (1918). Australian Industrial Problems. cited by Allan Charles Rocher, MP.
- F. A. A. Russell (1929). Essays and Excursions in Law.
- F. A. A. Russell (1930). Monetary Policy and the Slump of 1930: Keys of Exit.
- F. A. A. Russell (1931). History of the Gold Standard and Its Result. F. H. Booth & Son. p. 36.
