= General Brereton =

General Brereton may refer to:

- Lewis H. Brereton (1890–1967), United States Army lieutenant general
- Paul Brereton (born 1957), Australian Army Reserve major general
- Sir William Brereton, 1st Baronet (1604–1661), English Parliamentarian army general
- William Brereton (British Army officer) (1789–1864), British Army lieutenant general

== See also ==
- Brereton (surname)
