= William Brereton =

William Brereton may refer to:

- William Brereton (fl. 1406–1432), MP for Midhurst and Chichester
- William Brereton (courtier) (died 1536) in the privy chamber of Henry VIII
- Sir William Brereton (died 1559) (c. 1520–1559), MP for Cheshire in 1547 and 1559
- Sir William Brereton, 1st Baronet (1604–1661), Parliamentary General in the English Civil War
- William Brereton, 1st, 2nd and 3rd Lords Brereton
  - William Brereton, 1st Baron Brereton (1550–1630), MP for Cheshire in 1597, 1614 and 1621
  - William Brereton, 2nd Baron Brereton (1611–1664), MP for Cheshire in 1661
  - William Brereton, 3rd Baron Brereton (1631–1680), MP for Newton in 1659 and Bossiney 1660
- William Brereton (actor) (1751–1787), English actor
- William Brereton (British Army officer) (1789–1864), colonel in the Royal Horse Artillery
- William Brereton (priest) (1726–1812), Archdeacon of Lichfield, 1782–1801
- William Brereton (planter) (died 1822), planter in British Guiana

== See also ==
- Brereton (disambiguation)
