= Thomas Brereton (disambiguation) =

Thomas Brereton (1782–1832) was an officer of the British Army.

Thomas Brereton may also refer to:

- Thomas Brereton (dramatist) (1691–1722), English dramatist
- Sir Thomas Brereton, 2nd Baronet (1632–1674), of the Brereton baronets
- Thomas Salusbury (Liverpool MP) (died 1756), born Thomas Brereton, British Whig politician

== See also ==
- Brereton (surname)
