= Robert Maitland =

Robert Maitland may refer to:

- Robert Maitland (rugby union) (fl. 1881–1885), Scottish rugby union player
- Bob Maitland (1924–2010), British racing cyclist
- Robert Maitland (water polo) (born 1983), Australian water polo player

== See also ==
- Robert Maitland Brereton (1834–1911), English railway engineer
- Robert Maitland O'Reilly (1845–1912), 20th Surgeon General of the United States Army
