= John Brereton (disambiguation) =

John Brereton may also refer to:

- John Brereton, 4th Baron Brereton (1659–1718), English baron in the peerage of Ireland
- John Brereton (Adventurer and clergyman) (c. 1571–c. 1632), English gentleman adventurer, clergyman, and chronicler
- John Le Gay Brereton (1871–1933), Australian poet
- John Brereton (footballer) (1935–2021), Australian footballer
- John Brereton (lawyer) (1576–1629), English-born Irish lawyer

== See also ==
- Brereton (disambiguation)
