= George Alfred Russell =

George Alfred Russell (c. 1839 – 6 December 1926) was an Australian businessman involved in several business ventures, finally acting as Australian manager for the North British Insurance Company.

== History ==
Russell was born at “Claremont” St Anne's Parish, Jamaica, on July 15, 1839, the posthumous younger son of Henry Russell (1811–1839) and Elizabeth Russell, née Cunnington (1810–1882). (Note: Henry Russell was a son of Richard Russell (1756–1831) and Ann Russell, née Haslingden (1772–1831) of London and Walthamstow, Essex.) An obituary has G. A. Russell and H. E. Russell as sons of Edwin and Elizabeth Hough (died 7 July 1882), reinforced by the title of the book referenced below. Elizabeth Russell married Edwin Hough two years after her return from Jamaica after Henry Russell's death. He arrived in Sydney from London in 1859, first employed as shipping clerk for G. A. Lloyd, and later with George R. Dibbs, who was conducting a trade in coal and wheat with Valparaíso, Chile, where sometime around 1865 Russell married Louisa Gertrude Robey, daughter of R. M. Robey, Dibbs having married Anne Maria Robey in 1857. The business failed in 1867. Returning to Australia, he was involved in the flotation of a number of mining companies, serving as secretary to Woolgarlo Lead Mining Company, of which one director was John Le Gay Brereton, Sr., then from 1890 to 1909 manager of the North British and Mercantile Insurance Company. Described as "a man of exceptional culture and fine integrity", he was an expert chess player, playing for New South Wales against Victoria, and after moving to Victoria in 1890, a member of that team. He was a member of the Australian Club.

His remains were interred privately at the Brighton Cemetery.

== Family ==
George Alfred Russell married Louisa Gertrude Robey (c. 1847 – 29 March 1918), daughter of R. M. Robey, at Valparaíso around 1866. They lived at "Wotonga", Brighton, Victoria, "Warriston", Brighton, later 18 Wallace Avenue, Toorak.

- Francis Alfred Allison Russell KC (1868 – 30 October 1938), barrister, generally referred to as F. A. A. Russell, was born in Brighton, Victoria. His first wife was Julia "Dollie" Russell, who died on 24 March 1900. He married again, to Lilian Adela Maude Sophia Salter (1873–1956), on 7 October 1903, and lived at "Brackendale", Karnah-road, Turramurra, then Hunter's Hill, later "Holmwood", Shirley Road, Wollstonecraft. Their children include:

- Patience Allison "Pattie" Russell, (14 December 1904 – 18 September 1961) who married Ian Ross Campbell (23 March 1900 – 31 October 1997) on 26 April 1927 and had a daughter Gillian on 22 April 1928.
- Audrey Innes Russell, born 8 October 1906, was a popular socialite. During WWII she was ranked Flying Officer with WAAAF at No. 5 Operational Training Unit RAAF Station, Williamtown, New South Wales.
- Elsa Mary Lillian Russell (18 January 1909 – 1997) was a painter, served with the WAAAF at No. 5 Service Flying Training School RAAF, Uranquinty during WWII, and is remembered for her work as an unofficial war artist.
- Sybil Marguerite Russell, born July 1911, was engaged to Peter Nicholas Maine Perry (1912–2002), but remained single. She and sister Audrey were popular socialites.

- Edwin Robey Russell (28 August 1869 – ) married Nelly Maude Wilmot on 18 May 1897.He was manager of the Bank of New South Wales, Melbourne.
- Charles Townsend Russell (6 February 1871 – 5 August 1911), married Adelaide Jones on 15 April 1903. He was a solicitor, of Perth, Western Australia.
- Alan Hough Russell (26 September 1874 – ) married Grace Ruth McGann on 9 November 1904. He was manager of Commercial Union Assurance Company, and administrator of his father's estate; address 59 Queen Street, Melbourne.
- Lorna Beatrice Russell (1878 – 31 March 1963) married Ernest Le Gay Brereton on 2 June 1910
- Mary Gertrude Russell married Douglas Dunbar Jamieson on 27 July 1907, lived at Kew, Victoria.
- Esmond Russell (1884 – 18 November 1947) of Ormond, Victoria married Adelaide Brandon (c.1886 – 24 January 1974) on 26 January 1907. He was described as agent of Queen Street, Melbourne.

Russell's brother, Henry Edward Russell ( – 23 August 1917) married Frances Emily Robey (sister of Louisa Gertrude Russell and Anne Maria Dibbs) on 11 June 1870. Their children include Una Stella Haslingden Russell (born 1871 at Goulburn), who married John Downer on 29 November 1899. He died in Cairo, Egypt.
