= Battle of Rethymno =

World War II battle on Crete in 1941

Coordinates: 35°22′12″N 24°31′12″E

- Part of the Battle of Crete
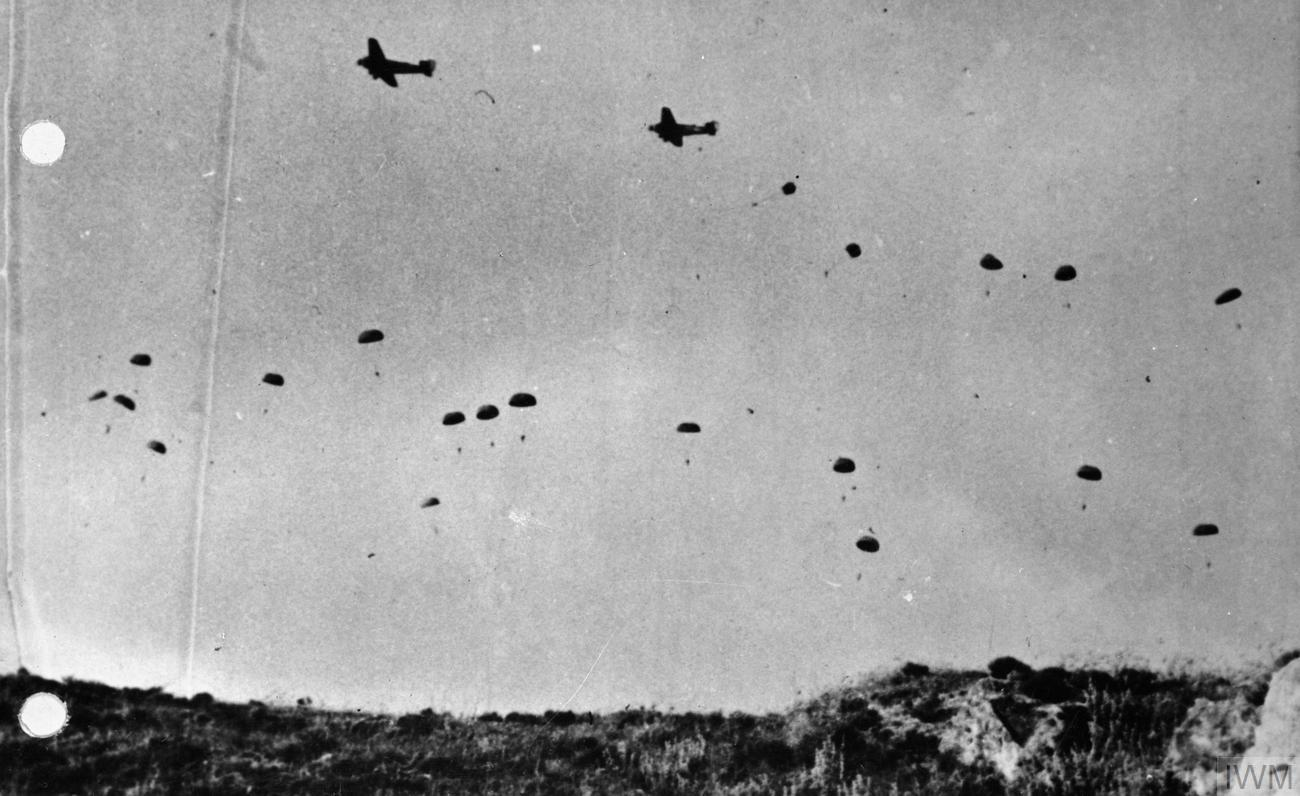
- German paratroopers jumping over Crete
Date	20–29 May 1941
Location	Rethymno, Crete
Result	German victory

Belligerents
Allies: Australia; Greece	(Nazi Germany) Germany

Commanders and leaders
(Australia) Ian Campbell	(Nazi Germany) Alfred Sturm

Strength
• 1,270 Australian infantry • Unknown number of support personnel • 3,100 Greek soldiers & armed police	• One parachute infantry regiment: c. 1,700

Casualties and losses
Unknown; Almost all Commonwealth troops killed or captured	Unknown, but heavy
- Location within Crete

The Battle of Rethymno (Note: Also spelt Retimo or Rethymnon. In Greek Μάχη του Ρεθύμνου (Mahi tou Rethymou).) was part of the Battle of Crete, fought during World War II on the Greek island of Crete between 20 and 29 May 1941. Australian and Greek forces commanded by Lieutenant-colonel Ian Campbell defended the town of Rethymno and the nearby airstrip against a German paratrooper attack by the 2nd Parachute Regiment of the 7th Air Division commanded by Colonel Alfred Sturm. (Note: The German code name for the attack on Crete was Unternemen Merkur (Operation Mercury). The force attacking Rethymno, together with those assaulting Suda and Chania to the west, was part of Gruppe Mitte (Central Group).)

The attack on Rethymno was one of four airborne assaults on Crete on 20 May, and part of the second series, following on from German attacks against Maleme airfield and the main port of Chania in the west of Crete in the morning. The aircraft which had dropped the morning attackers were scheduled to drop the 2nd Regiment over Rethymno later the same day; confusion and delays at the airfields in mainland Greece meant the assault was launched without direct air support and spread over an extended period rather than simultaneously. Those German units dropping near the Allied positions suffered very high casualties, both from ground fire and upon landing.

The German overall commander, Lieutenant-general Kurt Student, concentrated all resources on the battle for Maleme airfield, 50 miles (80 km) to the west, which the Germans won. The Allied Commander-in-Chief Middle East, General Archibald Wavell, ordered an evacuation of Crete on 27 May, but the Allied commander on Crete, Major-general Bernard Freyberg, was unable to communicate this to Campbell. Faced by a superior force of Germans equipped with tanks and artillery, Campbell surrendered on 29 May. Some Australians retreated into the hills to the south and, aided by the Cretans, 52 eventually escaped to Egypt.

== Background ==
Greece became a belligerent in World War II when it was invaded by Italy on 28 October 1940. A British and Commonwealth expeditionary force was sent to support the Greeks; this force eventually totalled more than 60,000 men. British forces also garrisoned Crete, enabling the Greek Fifth Cretan Division to reinforce the mainland campaign. This arrangement suited the British: Crete could provide the Royal Navy with excellent harbours in the eastern Mediterranean, and the Ploiești oil fields in Romania would be within range of British bombers based on the island. The Italians were repulsed by the Greeks without the aid of the expeditionary force. In April 1941 a German invasion overran mainland Greece and the expeditionary force was withdrawn. By the end of the month, 57,000 Allied troops were evacuated by the Royal Navy. Some were sent to Crete to bolster its garrison, although most had lost their heavy equipment.

The German Army High Command (Oberkommando des Heeres, OKH) was preoccupied with the forthcoming invasion of the Soviet Union and was largely opposed to an attack on Crete. Adolf Hitler was concerned about attacks on the Romanian oil fields from Crete and Luftwaffe commanders were enthusiastic about the idea of seizing the island by an airborne attack. In Führer Directive 28, Hitler ordered that Crete was to be invaded to use it "as an airbase against Britain in the Eastern Mediterranean". The directive also stated the operation was to take place in May and must not be allowed to interfere with the planned campaign against the Soviet Union.

== Opposing forces ==
=== Allies ===
On 30 April 1941, Major-general Bernard Freyberg, who had been evacuated from mainland Greece with the 2nd New Zealand Division, was appointed commander-in-chief on Crete. He noted the acute lack of heavy weapons, equipment, supplies and communication facilities. Equipment was scarce in the Mediterranean, particularly in the backwater of Crete. The British forces on Crete had had seven commanders in seven months. No Royal Air Force (RAF) units were based permanently on Crete until April 1941, but airfield construction took place, radar sites were built and stores delivered. By early April, airfields at Maleme and Heraklion and the landing strip at Rethymno, all on the north coast, were ready, and another strip at Pediada-Kastelli was nearly finished. In the space of a week 27,000 Commonwealth troops arrived from mainland Greece, many lacking any equipment other than their personal weapons, and some not even those; 9,000 of them had been further evacuated when the battle commenced and 18,000 remained. With the pre-existing garrison of 14,000, this gave the Allies a total of 32,000 Commonwealth troops to face the German attack, supplemented by 10,000 Greeks.

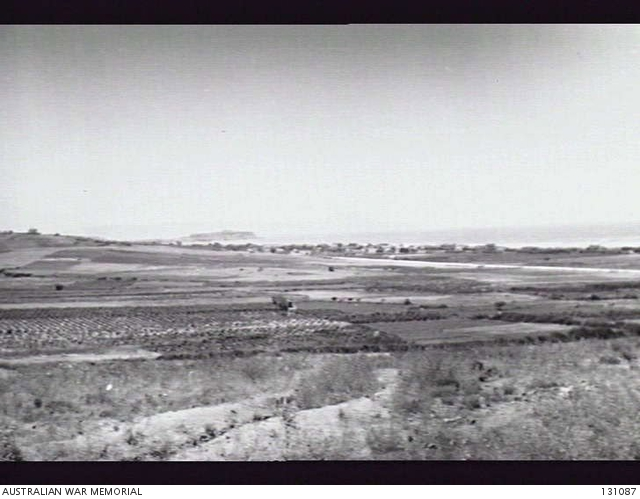
Perivolia and Rethymno from Hill B in 1945

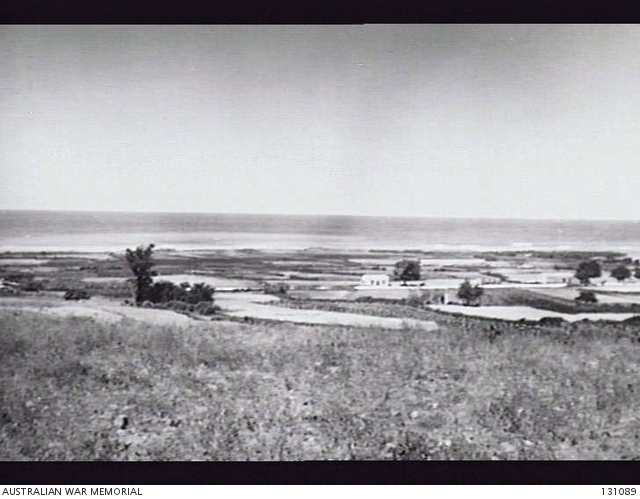
The coast and airfield from Hill B in 1945

The Rethymno area was garrisoned by two Australian and two Greek battalions, commanded by Lieutenant-colonel Ian Campbell. Both Australian battalions had fought in mainland Greece in April, suffering 180 casualties between them, and the first had only arrived at Rethymno on the 30th. The Australians totalled 1,270 experienced veterans and there were several smaller attached Commonwealth units. (Note: These included 90 men of the 6th Battery, 2/3rd Field Regiment; two platoons of the 2/1st Machine Gun Battalion; an ambulance company; two Matilda II heavy tanks; army, navy and air force signals parties; and other support troops.) The Greeks were 2,300 strong, but most had received little training and were ill-equipped and extremely short of ammunition. Not all of the Greeks had rifles. For those who had, ammunition averaged fewer than 20 rounds per man; many were issued with only three rounds. Campbell also had eight artillery pieces: four 75 mm calibre and four captured Italian 100 mm guns. Rethymno itself was defended by a battalion of 800 well-armed Greek Gendarmerie (paramilitary police) cadets. Campbell was in radio contact with Freyberg, but did not possess a code to decipher encrypted messages; as any messages sent in clear were liable to be intercepted by the Germans this severely restricted communications.

The Rethymno landing strip was about 8 miles (13 km) east of the town, near the village of Pigi. A ridge dominated the coast road and the landing strip in this area, running from "Hill A" in the east overlooking the landing strip and the village of Stavromenos to "Hill B" 2 mi (3 km) to the west near the village of Platanes. To the south "Hill D" gave a clear view of the terrain inland. The Australian 2/1st Battalion (2/1st) was dug in on Hill A and the ridge to its west, supported by six field guns, while the Australian 2/11th Battalion (2/11th), supported by two field guns and several machineguns, was positioned on and around Hill B. The Greek 4th Regiment was situated on the ridge between the two Australian units and the 5th Regiment was positioned south of the ridge as a reserve. Two Matilda II heavy tanks were in a gully immediately west of the landing strip and Campbell's headquarters was established on Hill D. All of the Allied units were well dug in and well camouflaged. Food stocks were limited and were supplemented by local foraging.

=== Germans ===
Map of the German assault on Crete; Rethymno is in the centre

The entire assault on Crete was code-named "Operation Mercury" (Unternehmen Merkur) and was controlled by the 12th Army commanded by Field Marshal Wilhelm List. The German 8th Air Corps (VIII Fliegerkorps) provided close air support; it was equipped with 570 combat aircraft. The infantry available for the assault were the German 7th Air Division, with the Air-landing Assault Regiment (Luftlande-Sturm-Regiment) attached, and the 5th Mountain Division. They totalled 22,000 men grouped under the 11th Air Corps (XI Fliegerkorps), which was commanded by Lieutenant-general Kurt Student, who was in operational control of the operation. Over 500 Junkers Ju 52s were assembled to transport them. Student planned a series of four parachute assaults against Allied facilities on the north coast of Crete by the 7th Air Division, which would then be reinforced by the 5th Mountain Division, part transported by air and part by sea; the latter component would also ferry much of the heavy equipment.

Before the invasion, the Germans conducted a bombing campaign against Crete and the surrounding waters to establish air superiority. The RAF rebased its surviving aircraft to Alexandria after 29 of their 35 Crete-based fighters were destroyed. A few days before the attack, German intelligence summaries stated that the total Allied force on Crete consisted of 5,000 men, that the garrison of Heraklion was 400 strong and that Rethymno was not formally garrisoned. For the assault on Rethymno the Germans assigned the 2nd Parachute Regiment of the 7th Air Division, minus one battalion. (Note: The 2nd Battalion of the 2nd Parachute Regiment was attached to the 1st Parachute Regiment for its attack on Heraklion, 50 mi (80 km) to the east.) This force was approximately 1,700 strong and was commanded by Colonel Alfred Sturm. Sturm's plan was for the regiment's 3rd Battalion (2/III), reinforced by two artillery units, to drop approximately 2 mi (3 km) east of Rethymno and capture the town. At the same time its 1st Battalion (2/I), reinforced by a machinegun company, would drop immediately to the east of the landing strip and capture it. Sturm himself would land mid-way between the two battalions with the regimental headquarters section and a reinforced company to act as a reserve.

==== Paratroopers ====
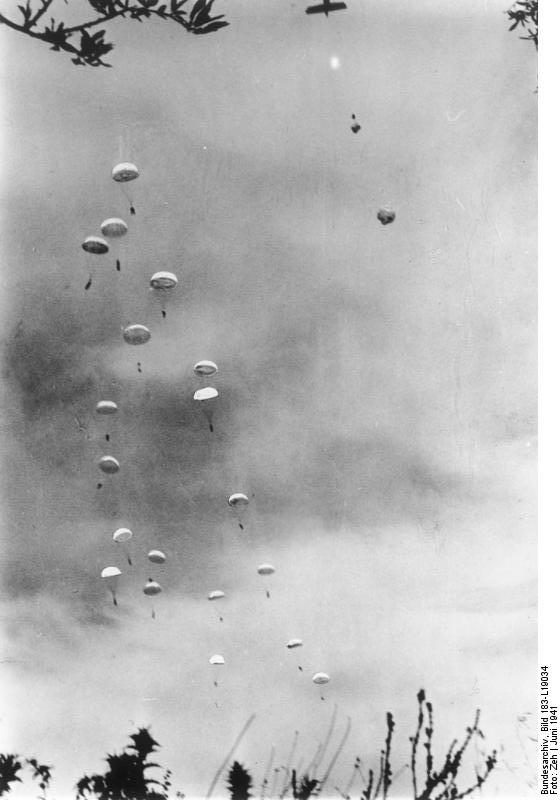
German paratroopers over Crete

The design of the German parachutes, and the mechanism for opening them, imposed operational constraints on the paratroopers. The static lines, which automatically opened the parachutes as the men jumped from the aircraft, were easily fouled and so each man wore a coverall over his webbing and equipment. This precluded their jumping with any weapon larger than a pistol or a grenade. Rifles, automatic weapons, mortars, ammunition, food and water were dropped in separate containers. Until and unless the paratroopers reached these they had only pistols and hand grenades with which to defend themselves.

The danger of fouling the static lines also required that German paratroopers leapt headfirst from their aircraft, and so were trained to land on all fours – rather than the usually recommended feet together, knees-bent posture – which resulted in a high incidence of wrist injuries. Once out of the plane, German paratroopers were unable to control their fall or to influence where they landed. Given the importance of landing close to one of the weapons containers, doctrine required jumps to take place from no higher than 400 feet (120 m) and in winds no stronger than 14 miles per hour (23 km/h). The transport aircraft had to fly straight, low and slowly, making them easy targets for any ground fire. Paratroopers were carried by the reliable tri-motored Ju 52. Each transport could lift thirteen paratroopers, with their weapons containers carried on the planes' external bomb racks.

== Battle ==
=== Initial assault ===
Allied dispositions and German drop zones on 20 May

On the morning of 20 May two reinforced German regiments landed by parachute and assault glider at Maleme airfield and near the main port of Chania in the west of Crete. The aircraft which dropped them were scheduled to make further drops at Rethymno and Heraklion in the afternoon. In mainland Greece the Germans were having problems with their hastily constructed airfield facilities, which were to have consequences for their attack on Rethymno. They were blanketed with dust clouds, reducing safe taxiing speeds and making taking off and landing hazardous. Several Ju 52s which had been damaged by Allied ground fire in the morning crashed on landing and had to be towed clear of the runways. Refuelling was carried out by hand and took longer than anticipated. Aware this would mean a significant delay to when the drop around Rethymno would commence, the commander of the Ju 52 wing, Rüdiger von Heyking, attempted to have the air support attack similarly delayed. Inadequate communication systems prevented this message from getting through in time.

The parachute drop was scheduled to take place at 14:00, immediately after a pre-assault softening up from German air support intended to force the defenders to take cover, distract them from the paratrooper attack and interrupt communications. It was 16:00 before this pre-assault air attack commenced; as fewer than 20 aircraft were involved it was ineffective. Having been informed at 14:30 of the attacks to the west, Campbell's forces realised this might be the prelude to a paratrooper assault. At 16:15 the first 24 of an eventual total of 161 Ju 52s appeared. They flew parallel to the coast on their drop runs, in easy sight and range of the Allied troops on the ridge. During the afternoon at least seven of the transport aircraft were shot down and several others disappeared from sight trailing thick smoke.

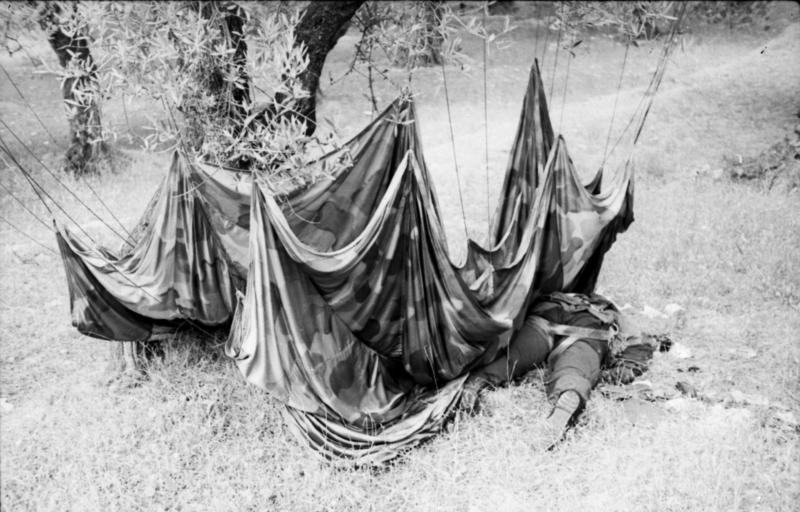
A dead paratrooper lying under his parachute

Evasive action by the German pilots resulted in some paratroopers landing in the sea. One group landed in a cane break resulting in all of its members being impaled and the parachutes of three Germans failed to open. Many Germans were shot and killed before they landed. Because of the disorder at the Greek mainland airfields, the German air operations over Rethymno were ill-coordinated. The paratrooper drops did not occur simultaneously. instead a succession of easy targets for Allied ground fire flew low, straight and level past the Allied-held coastal ridge. During this period no German fighters nor bombers returned to suppress the ground fire. The historian Antony Beevor describes the Germans' situation at this point as "chaotic".

The surviving Germans of the 2/I Battalion who had landed close to Hill A succeeded in reaching their weapons containers and attacked the hill. They were steadily reinforced by fellow paratroopers who had been dropped as far away as Stavromenos, 2 mi (3 km) from their target, and after fierce fighting the hill was captured. Campbell ordered his two Matilda II tanks to counter-attack, but both became immobilised in the rough terrain. The Australians set up a blocking position on the ridge and planned a fresh counter-attack. The German 2/I Battalion dug in on the hilltop, having suffered 400 dead or wounded. Campbell radioed Freyberg asking for reinforcements to enable a counter-attack to recapture the hill. At midnight Freyberg replied that none were available; Freyberg instead sent what reinforcements he had towards the more threatened Chania sector.

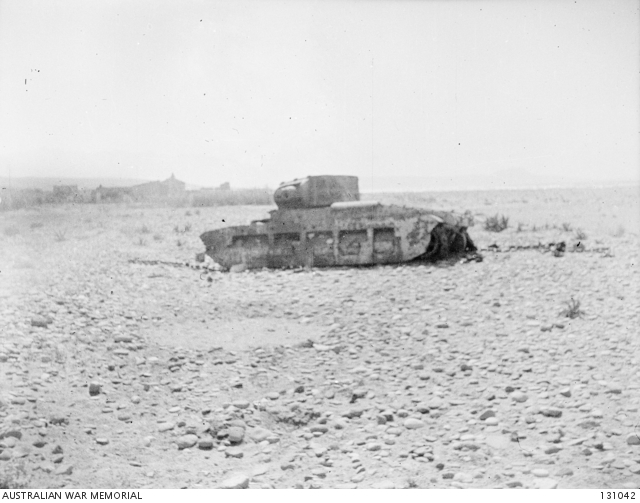
An Allied Matilda tank knocked out on the beach, photographed in 1945

Meanwhile, many members of the 2/III Battalion had been dropped in the wrong location, landing among the Australian 2/11th Battalion, where most of them were killed or pinned down and later captured. The remainder landed as planned to the west of Platanes, around the village of Perivolia. A Greek reservist training battalion holding this area collapsed and the Germans were able to reach their weapons containers, regroup and march on Rethymno. At around 18:00 they attempted to enter the town, but were beaten off by the Greek gendarmerie, supported by armed civilians, who included several priests and a monk.

The 2nd Parachute Regiment's headquarters section and attached company, almost 200 men, dropped into the middle of the Allied position and took heavy losses. During the night, 2/11th Battalion combed the area, capturing 88 prisoners and collecting a large quantity of weapons and ammunition. Sturm was himself taken prisoner on the 21st. The loss of all radio equipment during or immediately after the drop meant Student in Athens received no reports. At 19:00, he sent a plane to establish contact with the 2nd Parachute Regiment, but contact with it was lost and it failed to return.

=== Subsequent operations ===
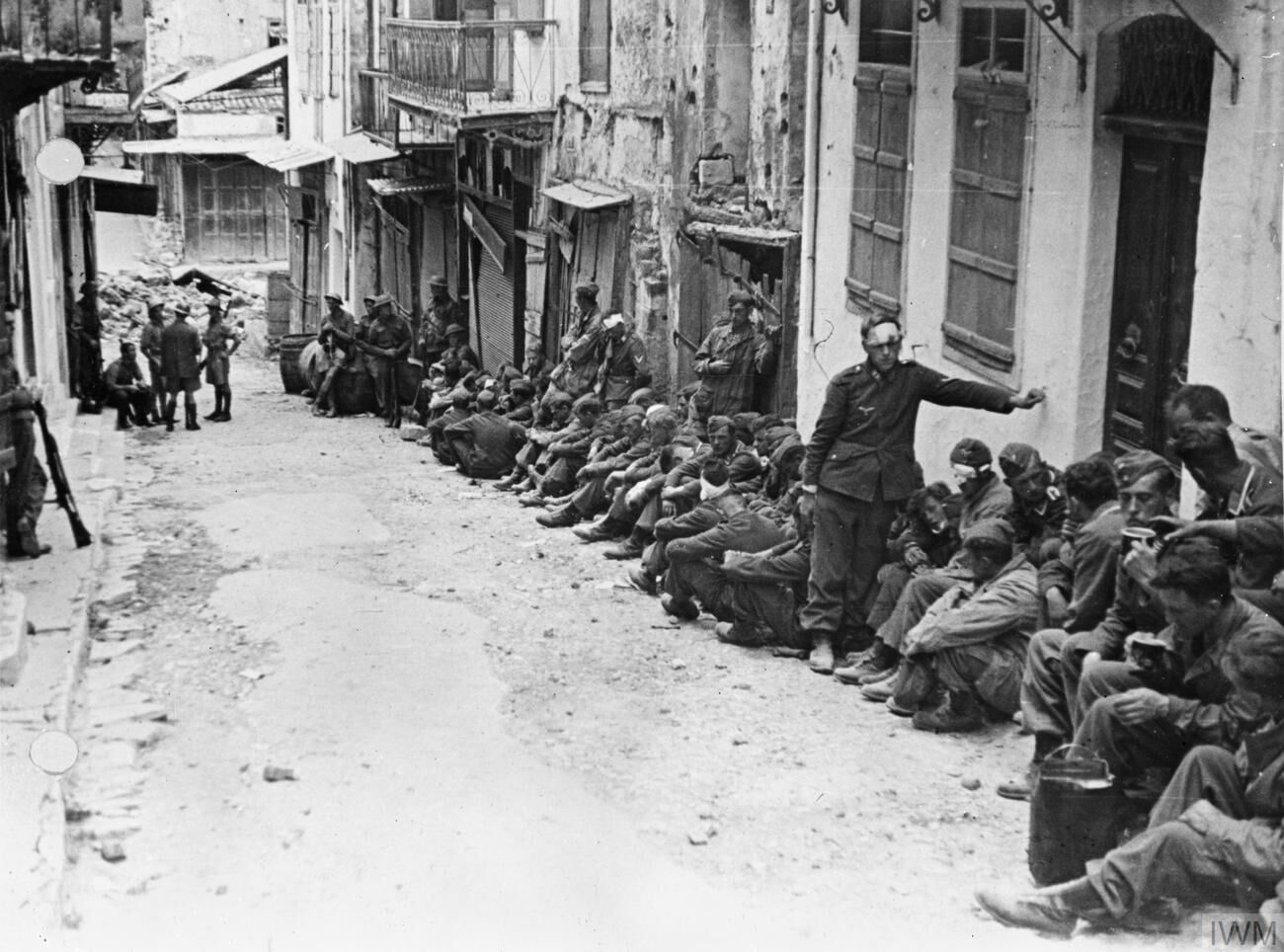
Captured German paratroopers

At first light on 21 May the 2/11th and the 5th Regiment attempted to recapture Hill A, but were repulsed. Campbell ordered a fresh attack for 08:00. Meanwhile, the Germans were preparing their own attack; this was disrupted when they were mistakenly bombed by their own aircraft. The subsequent Allied attack was successful after fierce close quarters fighting and the surviving Germans withdrew to a solidly constructed olive oil factory near the village of Stavromenos. The Allies recaptured their artillery pieces and recovered their two abandoned tanks.

The German 2/III Battalion renewed its attack on Rethymno on 21 May, but was beaten back and pinned down around Perivolia by the Greek gendarmerie from the town and armed civilians. This force was also bombed by its own aircraft, as well as being shelled by the Australians overlooking them from Hill B. When Ju 52s flew over, the Allies ceased fire and displayed captured panels requesting resupply; they received weapons, ammunition and equipment. That evening Student, still having received no news from the Rethymno landing, despatched another liaison aircraft. A German seaplane landed close offshore, a radio was transferred to rubber dinghy and this paddled towards the beach. The radio, dinghy and seaplane were destroyed by Australian fire. The Greek official history of the campaign states that in total on the 21st the Germans suffered 70 killed, 300 wounded and 200 taken prisoner.

Over the next few days the Allies repeatedly attacked the German positions at both Perivolia and the factory. The two recovered tanks proved useful but unreliable, repeatedly breaking down or bogging down on rough ground. The remnants of the 2/III Battalion hung on in an increasingly battered Perivolia, where the Australians used captured signal panels to direct German bombing onto the paratroopers. There were many German air attacks in support of the 2/III Battalion: one on 22 May against Rethymno killed several civilians, including the local prefect and the commander of the gendarmerie battalion. Several attempted Allied attacks on Perivolia came to nothing. Late on 23 May, the Germans launched an attack on the Australians with strong air support, but gained no ground. Part of the air support was again directed against Rethymno, where the local hospital was bombed. An attack on the olive oil factory on 22 May was unsuccessful when the 2/lst Battalion and the 4th Greek Regiment failed to coordinate. On 23 and 24 of May, the paratroopers executed over 80 civilians at Missiria. On 26 May, the Australians and the Greek 5th Regiment stormed the factory, taking about 100 prisoners, of whom 42 were wounded. The 30 surviving able-bodied men of the 2/I Battalion escaped to the east.

The historian Callum Macdonald states that on 20 May "little quarter had been given by either side" but that subsequently "the fighting became less savage". By the end of the battle, the Allies had taken prisoner more than 500 Germans. A joint hospital was set up near Adele, with German and Australian doctors working alongside each other. Conditions for all of the wounded were grim, with parachutes being cut up for bandages and no anesthetics. Most of the German dead lay where they had fallen; there were more than 400 bodies in front of the Allied positions. They bloated in the sun and were attacked by ravens. Intelligence officers searched them for documents, they were looted for souvenirs and the locals stole their boots. Beevor states some bodies were "hacked about by civilians". The state of the bodies resulted in claims of the mutilation and torture of wounded paratroopers, which were picked up and broadcast by Nazi radio.

=== Surrender ===
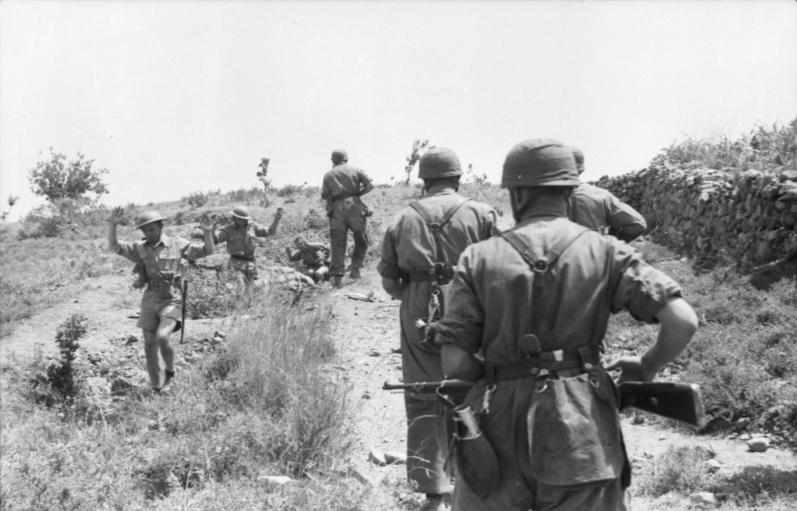
Allied soldiers surrendering on Crete

Meanwhile, the Germans had won the battle for Maleme airfield, captured the port town of Chania and pushed the Allies there east and south. On 26 May, Freyberg informed General Archibald Wavell, Commander-in-Chief Middle East, that the Battle of Crete was lost. The next day Wavell ordered the evacuation of the island. Freyberg wanted the force at Rethymno to head south for Plakias, from where they might be evacuated, but Campbell was unable to decipher encrypted radio messages and Freyberg did not want to risk alerting the Germans to the evacuation plans by sending the orders in clear. Freyberg ordered a messenger to carry the orders via a supply vessel sailing to Rethymno during the night of 27/28 May, but it left before the messenger could board. Several attempts were made to drop a message from aircraft on 27 and 28 May, but all failed and Campbell remained ignorant of the overall situation. He had sent an officer to Freyberg's headquarters earlier in the battle, who had returned on 26 May and reported that there was no suggestion of evacuation.

On the morning of 29 May a German force commanded by Lieutenant-colonel August Wittmann approached from the east. It was composed of units of the 85th and 141st Mountain Regiments and 31st Tank Regiment and included tanks and heavy artillery. The Germans attacked and isolated the Allied positions east of Rethymno. The Allies had all but consumed their food supplies and exhausted their ammunition and so Campbell surrendered, some time after noon. All of the German prisoners were released. Of the Australians, 934 survived to be taken prisoner, 190 of them wounded, and 96 were killed in the fighting. Many men from the 2/11th Battalion made off on their own and, assisted by the local population, 13 officers and 39 other ranks escaped to Egypt. The two Greek regiments withdrew, the 4th to Adele, where it surrendered, and the 5th to Arkadi, from where its members – many of whom were Cretan – dispersed. The number of Greek casualties suffered during the battle is not known.

== Aftermath ==
Crete fell to the Germans, but they suffered more casualties taking it than in the entire campaign in the Balkans until then. Almost 200 Ju 52s were put out of action. Due to their heavy losses on Crete, the Germans attempted no further large-scale airborne operations. Both the 2/1st and 2/11th battalions were reformed in Palestine around the small cadres of their surviving members. The German occupation of Crete was brutal: 3,474 Cretan civilians were executed by firing squad and many more were killed in reprisals and atrocities. The commander of the German troops on Crete, Major-general Hans-Georg Benthack, unconditionally surrendered in Heraklion on 9 May 1945 at the end of the war. Several places in Rethymno are named after Ian Campbell.

== Notes, citations, and sources ==
=== Sources ===
- Admiralty Historical Section (2002). The Royal Navy and the Mediterranean: November 1940 – December 1941. Whitehall Histories. Vol. II. London: Whitehall History in association with Frank Cass. ISBN 978-0-7146-5205-4.
- Antill, Peter D. (2005). Crete 1941: Germany's Lightning Airborne Assault. Oxford: Osprey. ISBN 978-1-84176-844-1.
- "2/11th Battalion". Second World War, 1939–1945 Units. Australian War Memorial. 2021. Archived from the original on 12 May 2021.
- Beevor, Antony (1991). Crete: The Battle and the Resistance. London: John Murray. ISBN 978-0-7195-4857-4.
- Bell, A. T. J. (1991). "The Battle for Crete – The Tragic Truth". Australian Defence Force Journal. 88 (May–June): 15–18. ISSN 1320-2545.
- Davin, Daniel Marcus (1953). Crete. The Official History of New Zealand in the Second World War 1939–1945. Wellington: Historical Publications Branch, Department of Internal Affairs, Government of New Zealand. OCLC 1252361. Archived from the original on 28 July 2020.
- Donaldson, I. A. (2004). "The Evacuation of the Heraklion Garrison from Crete, 28–29 May 1941". Journal of the Society for Army Historical Research. 82 (331): 210–226. JSTOR 44232721.
- Falvey, Denis (1993). "The Battle for Crete—Myth and Reality". Journal of the Society for Army Historical Research. 71 (286): 119–126. JSTOR 44224765.
- Gilbert, Martin (1989). Second World War. London: Weidenfeld & Nicolson. ISBN 978-0-297-79616-9.
- Hellenic Army History Directorate (1985). Επίτομη Ιστορία του Ελληνοϊταλικού και Ελληνογερμανικού Πολέμου 1940–1941 (Επιχειρήσεις Στρατού Ξηράς) [Abridged History of the Greco-Italian and Greco-German War 1940–1941 (Land Operations)] (in Greek). Athens. OCLC 34158145.
- "Gen. Ian Campbell". The Herald. 16 December 1997. Archived from the original on 5 May 2021.
- Long, Gavin (1953). Greece, Crete and Syria. Australia in the War of 1939–1945. Vol. 2. Canberra: Canberra Australian War Memorial. OCLC 251302540. Archived from the original on 5 May 2021.
- MacDonald, Callum (1995). The Lost Battle: Crete 1941. London: Macmillan. ISBN 978-0-333-61675-8.
- Murfett, Malcolm H. (2008). Naval Warfare 1919–1945: An Operational History of the Volatile War at Sea. London: Taylor & Francis. ISBN 978-0-415-45804-7.
- Pack, S.W.C. (1973). The Battle for Crete. Annapolis: Naval Institute Press. ISBN 978-0-87021-810-1.
- Polioudakis, Markos G.; Makris, Christos I. (1983). Η μάχη της Κρήτης στο Ρέθυμνο (The Battle of Crete at Rethymno) (in Greek). Vol. 1. Εκδοτική Εστία. ISBN 9789602203200.
- Prekatsounakis, Yannis (2017). The Battle for Heraklion. Crete 1941: The Campaign Revealed Through Allied and Axis Accounts. Solihull: Helion. ISBN 978-1-913336-01-1.
- Richards, Denis (1974) [1953]. Royal Air Force 1939–1945: The Fight at Odds. Vol. I (paperback (online) ed.). London: HMSO. ISBN 978-0-11-771592-9. Archived from the original on 5 May 2021.
- Spencer, John H. (1962). Battle for Crete. London: Heinemann. OCLC 2517566.
- Vick, Alan (1995). Snakes in the Eagle's Nest: A History of Ground Attacks on Air Bases. Santa Monica: RAND Corporation. ISBN 978-0-8330-1629-4.
- Vogel, Detlef (1995). "German Intervention in the Balkans". In Schreiber, Gerhard; Stegemann, Bernd; Vogel, Detlef (eds.). Germany and the Second World War: The Mediterranean, South-east Europe, and North Africa, 1939–1941. Vol. III. London: Oxford University Press. ISBN 978-0-19-822884-4.
