= Ladykirk and Norham Bridge =

Bridge in the Scottish Borders, Scotland

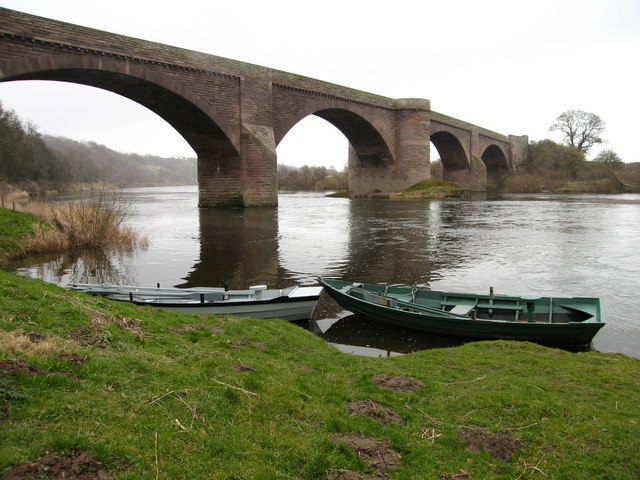
- Coordinates: 55.719°N 2.176°W
- Carries: B6470
- Crosses: River Tweed
- Locale: Norham in Northumberland, England; Ladykirk, Borders, Scotland

Characteristics
- Material: Stone
- No. of spans: 4

History
- Designer: Thomas Codrington; Cuthbert Arthur Brereton
- Construction start: 1885
- Construction end: 1887

Listed Building – Category B
- Official name: Ladykirk And Norham Bridge
- Designated: 8 June 1971
- Reference no.: LB8352

Location
- Interactive map of Ladykirk and Norham Bridge

The Ladykirk and Norham Bridge connects Ladykirk in the Borders, Scotland, with Norham in Northumberland, England, across the River Tweed. It is one of three bridges that cross the Tweed along the Anglo-Scottish Border, the others being the Coldstream Bridge and the Union Chain Bridge; out of these, the Ladykirk and Norham Bridge is the youngest, opening to the public in 1888.

== Earlier bridges ==
The previous bridge was a timber trestle built between 1838 and 1839 by J. Blackmore. The bridge was funded by subscribers purchasing shares; David Robertson, 1st Baron Marjoribanks paid £3000, and ten others paid £500 each.

This bridge used curved ribs eight planks deep at the ends and three planks deep in the middle, where each individual plank is 6 inches (150 mm) deep. These were used to create two arches, each of 190 feet (58 m) span and 17 feet (5.2 m) rise, each arch was supported by two trusses. The planks were 18 feet (5.5 m) long, and no piece of timber in the bridge was longer than 28 feet (8.5 m). The roadway was 18 feet (5.5 m) wide. The entire bridge was restored in 1852, with the exception of the stone piers.

== History ==
Construction of the present stone bridge lasted from 1885 to 1887. The bridge is listed at grade II by English Heritage and at category B by Historic Scotland. A former toll house - Lower Toll Cottage and a bridge marker stone sit immediately on the Scottish side.

It was designed by Thomas Codrington and Cuthbert Arthur Brereton for the Tweed Bridges Trust.

== Design ==
It is a late stone road arch bridge with four spans. The two middle arches are of 90 feet (27 m) span, and the outer two of 85 feet (26 m) span, and the width of the roadway between the parapets is 14 feet (4.3 m). The outer piers have triangular cutwaters, but the central pier has a curved cutwater that continues up to the height of the road, with a break in the parapet to create a refuge for pedestrians.

The bridge uses dressed-stone for the arch rings, and has coursed-rubble spandrels and wing walls. It is built from red sandstone, and faced with ashlar dressings. The spandrels are hollow to reduce the load on the arches, an innovation by Thomas Telford.

The bridge carries the B6470 public road between the villages of Ladykirk in Scotland and Norham in England. It is just downstream from Canny Island, a river island in the Tweed.

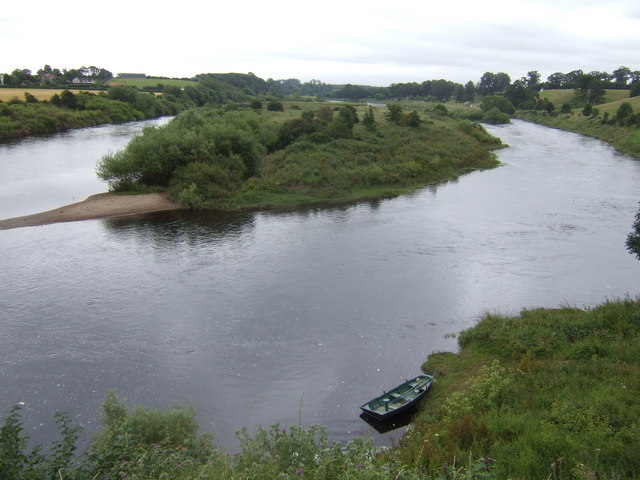
Canny Island, viewed from Ladykirk and Norham Bridge.

== See also ==
- List of bridges in Scotland
