= Paul Cullen (general) =

Australian general

Paul Alfred Cullen
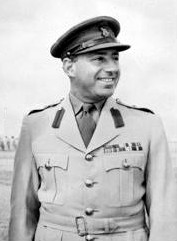
- Brigadier Paul Cullen, c. 1954
- Born: 13 February 1909; Newcastle, New South Wales
- Died: 7 October 2007 (aged 98)
- Military career
- Allegiance: Australia
- Branch: Australian Army
- Service years: 1927–1966
- Rank: Major General
- Service number: NX163
- Commands: 14th Brigade (1955–58); 45th Battalion (c.1948–55); 2/1st Battalion (1942–45)
- Conflicts: Second World War; North African campaign; Battle of Greece; South West Pacific theatre; New Guinea Campaign; Kokoda Track campaign; Aitape–Wewak campaign
- Awards: Companion of the Order of Australia; Commander of the Order of the British Empire; Distinguished Service Order & Bar; Efficiency Decoration

Major General Paul Alfred Cullen, AC, CBE, DSO & Bar, ED (13 February 1909 – 7 October 2007) was a senior officer in the Australian Army. He joined the Militia in 1927 and saw active service throughout the Second World War, distinguishing himself as a fighting battalion commander on the Kokoda Track. Post war, he continued to serve in the Citizen Military Forces (CMF) and rose to the rank of major general as the CMF Member of the Military Board.

In civil life he was founder of Mainguard, Australia's first merchant bank; founder and first chairman of Austcare; a noted philanthropist and refugee advocate.

== Early life ==
Born Paul Alfred Cohen at Newcastle, New South Wales, on 13 February 1909 to a Jewish family, Cullen was the youngest of three children to businessman Sir Samuel Cohen and his wife Elma (née Hart).

== Military career ==
Cullen enlisted in the Militia (ORs) 1st Heavy Brigade, Australian Garrison Artillery in 1927 and was commissioned on 22 May 1931. Promotion to captain followed on 24 July 1935 and he was appointed Officer Commanding 16th Battery, RAA on 25 October 1935.

=== Second World War ===
Following the declaration of war on 3 September 1939, Cullen was seconded as a captain to the 2/2nd Battalion on 13 October 1939 and officially enlisted in the Second Australian Imperial Force as an officer on 30 October 1939 with the army number NX163.

==== Middle East ====
Cullen arrived in the Middle East theatre on 13 February 1940, his 31st birthday, and completed the Middle East Tactical School course during the period 6 March to 8 April 1940. He was then attached to the 2/1st Battalion from 25 September to 17 October 1940. Returning to the 2/2nd Battalion, he was promoted major on 15 November 1940, serving as a Company Commander and was Second-in-Command by the time he arrived in Greece on 19 May 1941. In Greece he converted much of the battalion's cash to gold which proved valuable in obtaining rations and support from the local populace during the withdrawal to Crete and on to the Middle East where he arrived in June 1941. His observation of the German attitude to people of the Jewish faith led him to officially change his name from Cohen to Cullen on 25 September 1941 as a precaution in the event of being captured by the Germans.

==== Kokoda Trail and Papua New Guinea ====
Cullen sailed from the Middle East to return to Australia and arrived in Ceylon on 28 March 1942. There he was promoted temporary lieutenant colonel as Commanding Officer (CO) of the 2/1st Battalion, a post he held from 11 June 1942 to 28 August 1945. He returned to Melbourne, on 7 August 1942 and was promoted substantive lieutenant colonel on 1 September 1942. Sailing with his battalion, he arrived in Port Moresby on 21 September 1942, leading them with great distinction during the advance to recapture Kokoda he earned a reputation as fighting commander. He returned to Brisbane, Australia, to reinforce and retrain the battalion on 8 January 1943 and awarded the Distinguished Service Order (DSO) for "continuous distinguished service in New Guinea, South West Pacific" as CO 2/1st Battalion on 23 December 1943.

Seconded to Headquarters 16th Brigade on 29 January 1944, Cullen arrived in Port Moresby on 14 March 1944 where he was attached to Headquarters New Guinea Force from 28 March 1944. He returned to Cairns, Australia, on 28 March 1944 and was again attached to Headquarters 16th Brigade for the period 8 May to 12 June 1944. He returned to New Guinea with the 2/1st Battalion and arrived Aitape on 15 December 1944. He then returned to Australia on 13 April 1945 and completed the Land Headquarters Tactical senior officers course during the period 22 April to 3 June 1945. Returning to New Guinea on 16 June, he was attached to Headquarters 16th Brigade for the period 4 August to 7 September 1945. He returned to Cairns on 19 September 1945. He was awarded a Bar to his Distinguished Service Order for gallant and distinguished service in the Aitape–Wewak campaign as CO 2/1st Battalion on 2 November 1946 (gazetted 6 March 1947).

=== Post-war service ===
On the raising of the Citizen Military Forces, Cullen was appointed Commanding Officer of the 45th Battalion (The St George Regiment) on 1 April 1948. He was promoted temporary brigadier, Commanding 14th Brigade, on 2 July 1955 and confirmed as a substantive brigadier on 2 July 1956. He served on the Officers Staff Group, Eastern Command, from 2 July 1958 until his appointment as Deputy Commander 1st Division on 1 July 1960. Promoted major general commanding Communications Zone on 1 December 1961, Cullen transferred to the Unattached List on 1 December 1963 before serving as the Citizen Military Force member of the Military Board. He was also awarded the Efficiency Decoration (ED) for efficient service as an officer in the Citizen Military Forces.

Major General Cullen transferred to the Retired List on 2 December 1966 but remained an outspoken champion of the part-time soldier.

== Other roles ==
Cullen created the first unit trusts in Australia, was the founder of the nation's first merchant bank, Mainguard (Australia), in 1950. The bank failed after it invested poorly in a rice farm.

In November 1981 Cullen founded the Refugee Council of Australia, and was its inaugural president.

He was also president of both the Australian Jewish Welfare Society for Refugees and the Royal Blind Society of New South Wales.

== Recognition and awards ==
- 1965: Cullen was appointed a Commander of the Order of the British Empire (CBE) on 1 January 1965.
- 1978: Cullen was appointed an Officer of the Order of Australia (AO) "In recognition of service to the community of ex-service personnel and their dependents" in the Queen's Birthday list on 6 June 1978.
- 1981: Cullen was awarded the Nansen Refugee Award by the UNHCR for his support of refugees through Austcare and Australian Jewish community organisations.
- 1988: He was raised to a Companion of the Order of Australia (AC), "In recognition of service to the community, particularly to the welfare of the blind and visually impaired" on Australia Day, 26 January 1988.

A portrait of Cullen by artist Mathew Lynn, painted in 2002 when Cullen was 93 years old, hangs in the National Portrait Gallery (Australia).

== Personal life ==
Cullen was married three times. His first wife was Phyllis Marjorie Sampson, and with her had twins Christopher and Dinah. His second wife was Jenny Whitington (née Drake-Brockman), from whom he was divorced. In 1973 he married Eve Daly, and with her bred Galloway cattle at Wingello Park, near Goulburn, New South Wales, from 1983.
