= Norham Castle, Sunrise =

Painting by J. M. W. Turner

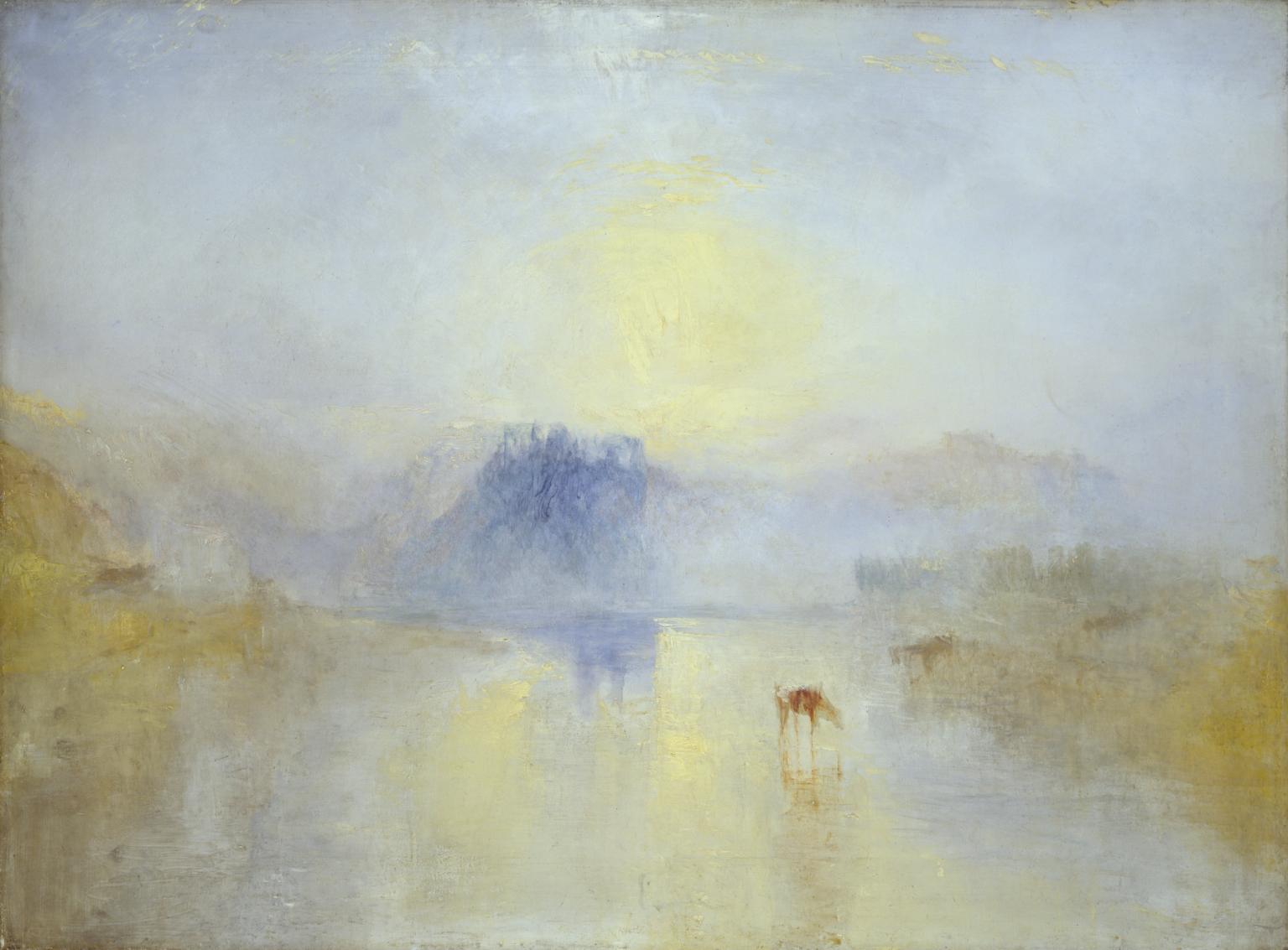
- Artist: J. M. W. Turner
- Year: c. 1845
- Medium: Oil on canvas
- Dimensions: 90.8 cm × 121.9 cm (35.7 in × 48.0 in)
- Location: Tate Britain, London
- Accession: N01981
- Website: tate.org.uk/...n01981

Norham Castle, Sunrise is an oil-on-canvas painting by English painter J. M. W. Turner, created around 1845. The painting depicts Norham Castle, overlooking the River Tweed, the border between England and Scotland. The painting was bequeathed to the National Gallery of British Art (now Tate Britain) as part of the Turner Bequest in 1856. It remains in the collection to this day. It was one of the artist's last paintings, and falls within his "Modernist" period. This piece is well known for Turner's attentiveness to dawn light, and the softened silhouette it brings.

== Background ==
Norham is a village in Northumberland, England in the border country between England and Scotland. The castle was a key stronghold overlooking the River Tweed and was frequently attacked by the Scots. Turner visited the castle and the surrounding country in 1797. Following his journey, Turner created the watercolor Norham Castle: Sunrise, which was exhibited at the Royal Academy of Arts in 1798 to critical acclaim. Turner revisted the ruins in 1801. In 1806, Turner began work on his Liber Studiorum, a collection of monochrome landscape prints. Norham Castle, Sunrise was among a series of unfinished colored reworkings of these prints. The source for this painting in particular was the Tate Collection's Liber catalogue's plate no. 57, Norham Castle on the Tweed, published in 1816.

Previous depictions
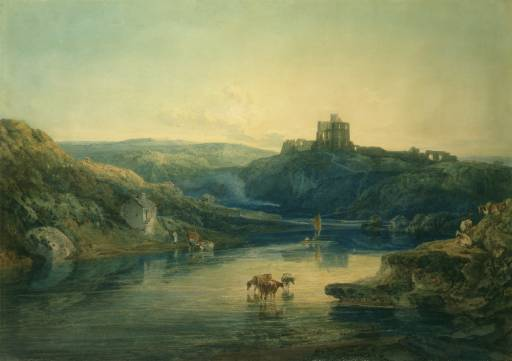
Norham Castle: Sunrise, c. 1798

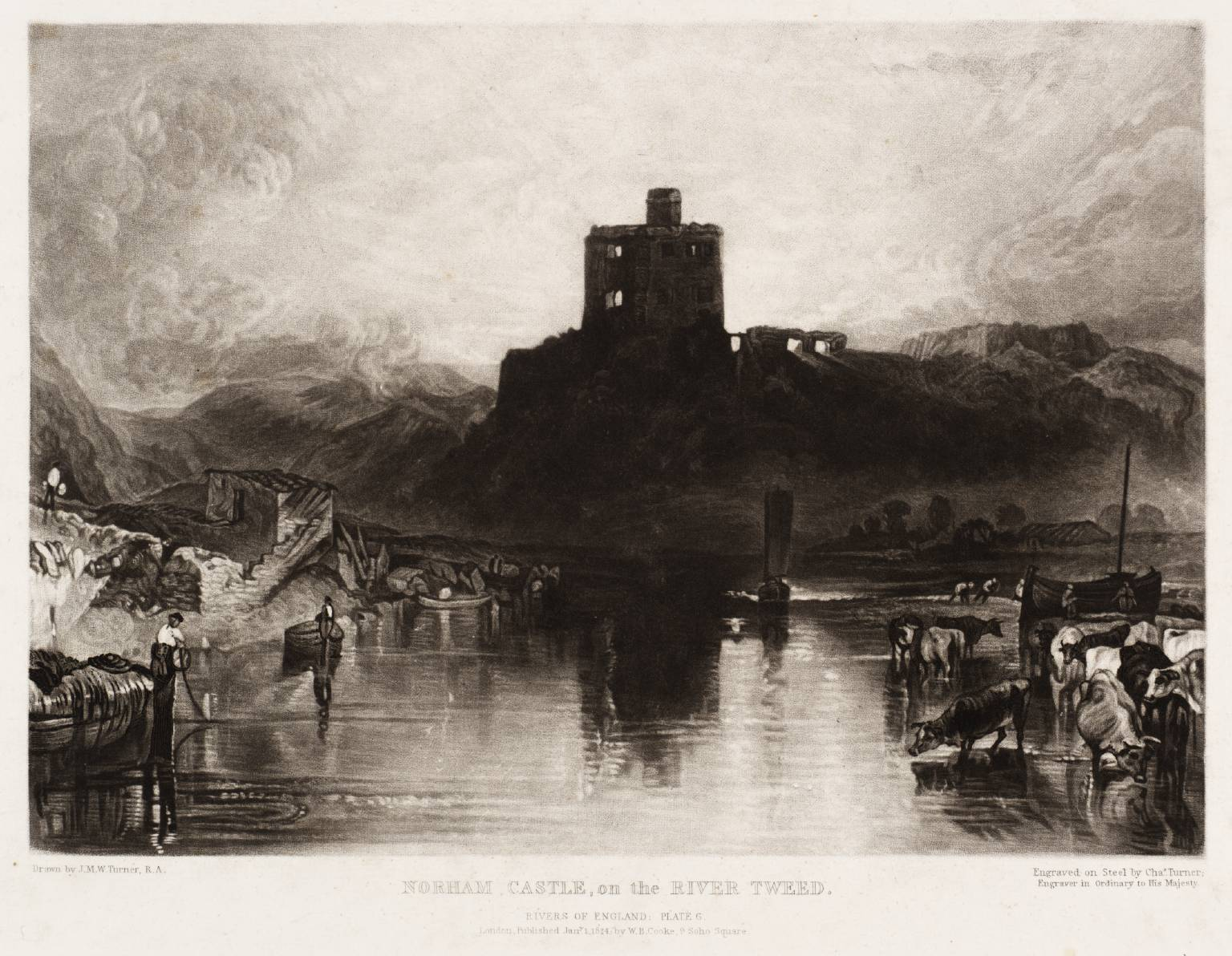
Norham Castle on the Tweed, c. 1816

By the end of his career, Turner had created six different versions of this painting and returned to Norham Castle multiple times to reflect on his work and life. In a visit in 1831, Turner said to a companion that drawing and painting Norham Castle started him on the path of becoming a successful artist.

== See also ==
- List of paintings by J. M. W. Turner
