= 2/1st Battalion (Australia) =

Battalion of the Australian Army

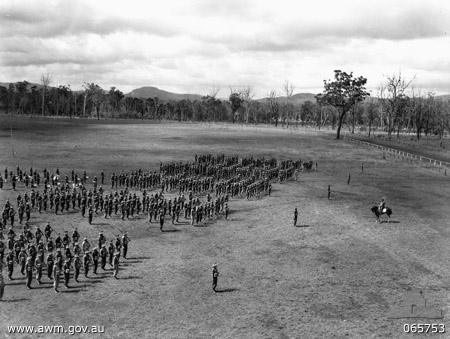
- Troops from the 2/1st at Wondecla, Queensland, April 1944
- Active: October 1939 – December 1945
- Country: Australia
- Branch: Australian Army
- Type: Infantry
- Size: ~800–900 personnel
- Part of: 16th Brigade, 6th Division
- Colours: Black over green
- Engagements: World War II: North African campaign; Greek campaign; New Guinea campaign

Commanders
- Notable commanders: Kenneth Eather; Paul Cullen; Ian Ross Campbell

Insignia
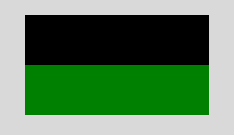
- Unit colour patch

The 2/1st Battalion was an infantry battalion of the Australian Army. Formed as part of the Second Australian Imperial Force at the start of World War II, the battalion was deployed to the Middle East in early 1940 and subsequently took part in the early fighting in the North African campaign, taking part in battles around Bardia and Tobruk before later being sent to Greece in early 1941. A lightning German advance quickly pushed the Allies back and forced them to evacuate after a very short campaign and the 2/1st was landed on Crete where they subsequently fought unsuccessfully to repel a German invasion in May. The majority of the battalion was captured on Crete, but the 2/1st was subsequently re-built from survivors in Palestine and returned to Australia in early 1942 following Japan's entry into the war. They then fought two campaigns against the Japanese in New Guinea, fighting in the Kokoda Track campaign during 1942–43 and the Aitape–Wewak campaign in 1944–45. Following the war, the 2/1st was disbanded.

== History ==
=== Formation ===
Raised at Victoria Barracks, Sydney, on 16 October 1939 as part of the 16th Brigade of the 6th Australian Division, the 2/1st Battalion was one of the first infantry battalions raised as part of the all-volunteer Second Australian Imperial Force at the start of World War II. Its first commanding officer was Lieutenant Colonel Kenneth Eather, a former Militia officer. The colours chosen for the battalion's unit colour patch (UCP) were the same as those of the 1st Battalion, a unit which had served during World War I before being raised as a Militia formation in 1921. These colours were black over green, in a horizontal rectangular shape, although a border of gray was added to the UCP to distinguish the battalion from its Militia counterpart.

With an authorised strength of around 900 personnel, like other Australian infantry battalions of the time, the battalion was formed around a nucleus of four rifle companies – designated 'A' through to 'D' – each consisting of three platoons. After formation, a brief period of basic training was undertaken at Ingleburn, New South Wales, before the battalion embarked for overseas service on 10 January 1940, aboard the SS Orford.

=== Greece and the Middle East ===
After sailing via the Suez Canal, the 2/1st arrived in Egypt on 13 February. The battalion then moved to Palestine where it concentrated with the rest of the 16th Brigade at Julis near Gaza. The entire brigade remained in Palestine until the end of August, when it moved to Egypt to carry out preparations for active service with the 6th Division. The battalion's first campaign of World War II was the advance from Egypt into eastern Libya in January and February 1941. On 3 January 1941, the battalion took part in the first Australian ground action of the war, spearheading the 6th Division's attack to capture Bardia. Striking from the west, the 2/1st went in just after dawn supported by artillery, armour and aircraft, breaching the wire defences in front of the Italian positions, establishing a bridgehead for the follow-on forces to exploit. Later in the month, the 2/1st was once again in the vanguard when the 16th Brigade led the 6th Division's assault on the Italian-held port of Tobruk. Following its capture, the battalion was left to garrison Tobruk as the advance continued. It left Tobruk on 7 March, ultimately bound for Greece with the rest of the 6th Division, amidst concerns of a German invasion.

The battalion arrived in Greece on 22 March and was quickly deployed to the north of the country to resist the anticipated German attack. The battalion took up positions at Veria on 7 April but, the Allied forces was quickly overwhelmed and it was forced to withdraw south on 12 April, eventually being evacuated by sea from Megara on 25 April. Instead of returning to Egypt, the 2/1st was landed on the island of Crete, arriving the day after they were evacuated from Megara, and they were pressed into defend the airfield at Retimo, where they joined the 2/11th Battalion. On 20 May, the Germans launched an airborne invasion of Crete. Two battalions of German parachute troops attacked the airfield and the 2/1st, by then under the command of Lieutenant Colonel Ian Campbell, was heavily engaged as they put up a strong defence during the Battle of Retimo. The Allied evacuation began on 28 May, but the message to withdraw did not get through to the two battalions holding the airfield, and they continued to hold until 30 May. At that point, though, they were overwhelmed as the Germans, having been victorious elsewhere on the island, were able to bring in reinforcements – including armour and artillery – and concentrate their efforts against the two battalions holding Retimo. As food and ammunition ran out, the 2/1st Battalion was forced to surrender and its personnel became prisoners of war. The fighting on Crete cost the 2/1st heavily, with 43 killed, 64 wounded and 511 captured.

The losses on Crete represented the vast majority of the battalion's personnel, but by June there were about 70 men from the 2/1st in Palestine, some of whom had managed to escape after the fall of Crete and some who had been brought back there after Greece, rather than landing on Crete. The decision was subsequently made to re-form the battalion, rather than disband it. This was done by transferring 200 experienced men from the 16th Brigade's other two battalions – the 2/2nd and 2/3rd – and bringing in 500 newly arrived reinforcements. In October 1941, after the 2/1st had been rebuilt, it was allocated to garrison duties, taking up the defences in northern Syria, which had been captured from the Vichy French during the Syria–Lebanon Campaign that had been fought earlier in the year. Japan's entry into the war in December 1941 resulted in plans to bring the 6th Division back to Australia to help bolster the country's defences and on 10 March 1942, the 2/1st embarked for home. During the voyage, the battalion was diverted to Ceylon to defend it from a possible Japanese invasion. The invasion never came and the 2/1st Battalion finally arrived in Melbourne on 7 August 1942.

=== New Guinea ===
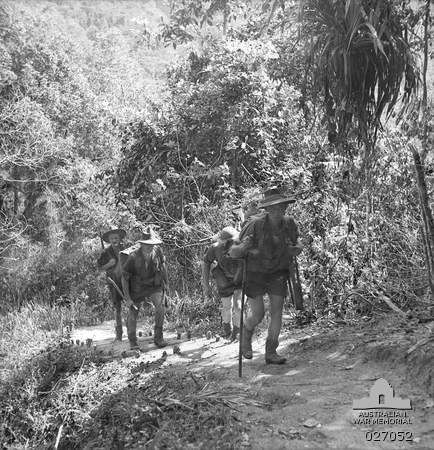
Troops from the 16th Brigade, including some from the 2/1st Battalion, cross the Owen Stanleys in October 1942.

After only a short period of respite, the 2/1st deployed to New Guinea, arriving there in September 1942 just as the tide of the Kokoda Track campaign began to turn back in the favour of the Allies. The battalion subsequently joined the Allied pursuit of the withdrawing Japanese north towards their beachheads around Buna–Gona, and during the counter-offensive the 2/1st Battalion were involved in the major battles at Eora Creek and then at Gorari, followed by Sanananda between October and late November 1942. Heavy casualties were suffered by the battalion during the campaign, with over 60 percent being killed, wounded or evacuated sick. Subsequent to the Kokoda campaign, the 2/1st returned to Australia to rebuild. At this time they received a large batch of reinforcements from the 49th Battalion, a Militia battalion that had fought around Sanananda before being disbanded.

After their return to Australia, a long period of reorganisation followed, during which the battalion was converted to the jungle warfare establishment, which saw its authorised strength fall from around 900 men to just over 800. Late in the war, in December 1944, they were then sent back to New Guinea to help round up an estimated 35,000 Japanese in the Aitape–Wewak region. The campaign lasted until the war ended and saw the 2/1st join the coastal advance towards the main Japanese base at Wewak along with the rest of the 16th Brigade.

The battalion was finally disbanded in December 1945. During the war, a total of 3,491 men served with the battalion of whom 263 were killed and 418 wounded. Decorations awarded to members of the 2/1st included: three Distinguished Service Orders with one Bar, 15 Military Crosses, seven Distinguished Conduct Medals, 28 Military Medals and 68 Mentions in Despatches.

== Battle honours ==
The 2/1st received the following battle honours:

- Bardia 1941; Capture of Tobruk; Mount Olympus; Brallos Pass; Retimo; Kokoda Trail; Eora Creek–Templeton's Crossing II; Oivi–Gorari; Buna–Gona; Sanananda Road; Nambut Ridge; But–Dagua; and Hawain River.

== Commanding officers ==
The following officers commanded the 2/1st Battalion during the war:

- Lieutenant Colonel Kenneth Eather (1939–41);
- Lieutenant Colonel Ian Ross Campbell (1941);
- Lieutenant Colonel Tom White (1942);
- Lieutenant Colonel Paul Cullen (1942–45).
