= Norham =

Village in Northumberland, England

Coordinates: 55.718°N 2.158°W

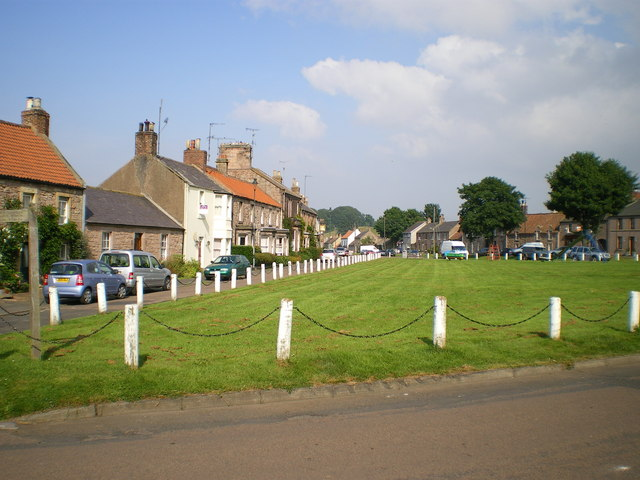
- Norham Village Green

- Location within Northumberland
- Population: 579 (2011 census)
- OS grid reference: NT900471
- Civil parish: Norham
- Unitary authority: Northumberland
- Ceremonial county: Northumberland
- Region: North East
- Country: England
- Sovereign state: United Kingdom
- Post town: BERWICK-UPON-TWEED
- Postcode district: TD15
- Dialling code: 01289
- Police: Northumbria
- Fire: Northumberland
- Ambulance: North East
- UK Parliament: North Northumberland

Norham (/ˈnɒrəm/ NORR-əm) is a village and civil parish in Northumberland, England, 7 miles (11 km) south-west of Berwick on the south side of the River Tweed where it is the border with Scotland.

== History ==
Its ancient name was Ubbanford. Ecgred of Lindisfarne (d.845) replaced a wooden church with one of stone and translated the relics of St Ceolwulf to it. Norham is mentioned as the resting place of St Cuthbert in the early eleventh century text On the Resting-Places of the Saints, and recent research has suggested the possibility that Norham (rather than Chester-le-Street or Durham) may have been the centre of the diocese of Lindisfarne from the ninth century until some time between 1013 and 1031.

It is the site of the 12th-century Norham Castle and was for many years the centre of the Norhamshire exclave of County Durham. It was transferred to Northumberland in 1844.

The 12th century also saw the construction of the parish church of St Cuthbert, an ambitious work with an aisled nave and long chancel, heavily rebuilt in 1846–1852. As may be expected from a possession of the bishops of Durham, the details echo contemporary work in Durham Cathedral.

It was on the Tweed here that Edward I of England met the Scots nobility in 1292 to decide on the future king of Scotland.

Sir Walter Scott gained fame as a poet, particularly with Marmion set around the Battle of Flodden in 1513. It begins:

Day set on Norham's castled steep,
And Tweed's fair river, broad and deep,
And Cheviot's mountains lone:
The battled towers, the donjon keep,
The loophole grates where captives weep,
The flanking walls that round it sweep,
In yellow lustre shone.

The 19th-century Ladykirk and Norham Bridge is a late stone road bridge that connects the village with Ladykirk in the Scottish Borders.

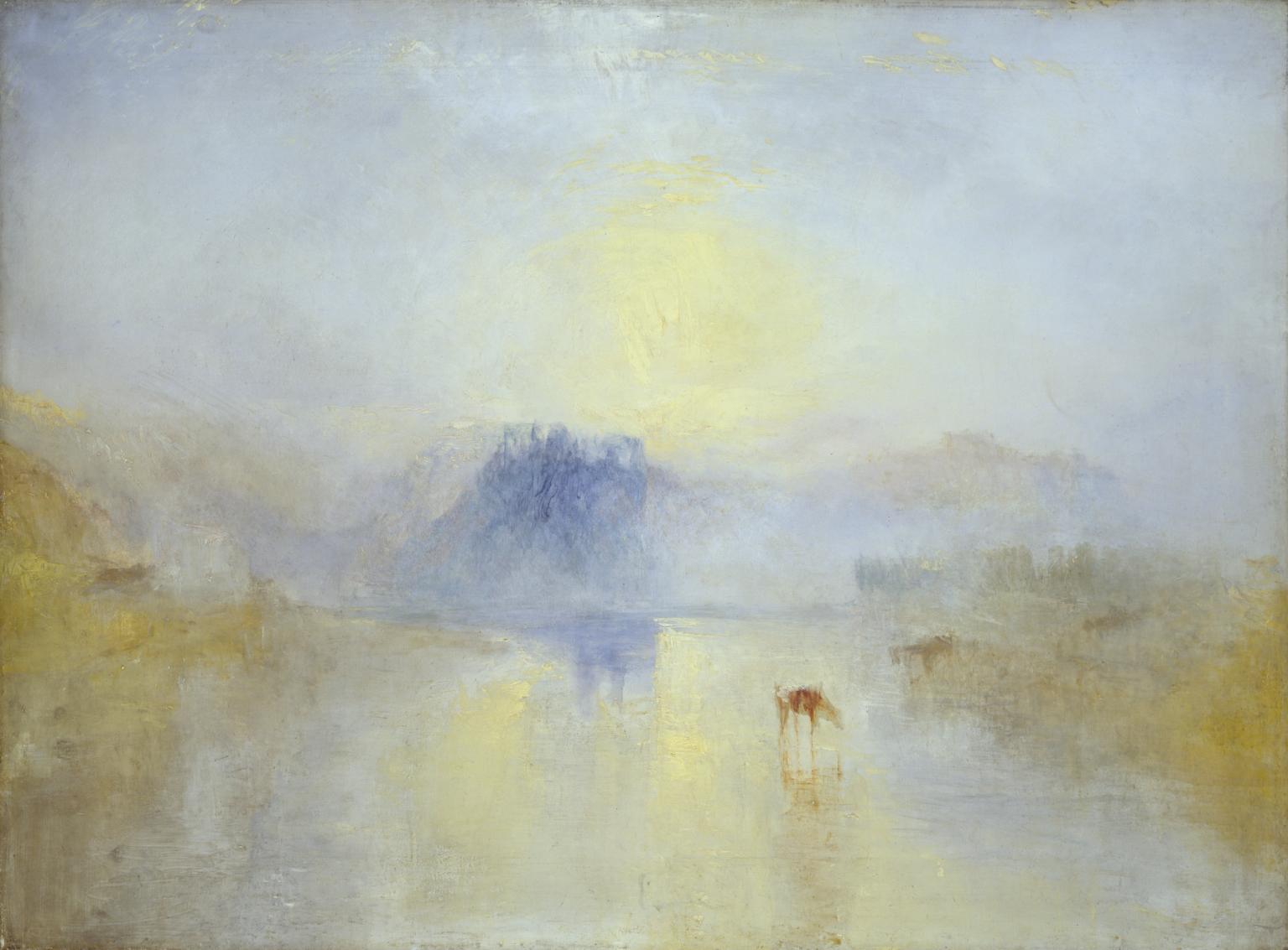
Norham Castle, Sunrise by J. M. W. Turner

J. M. W. Turner reportedly tipped his hat to Norham Castle in 1831, as it was the place that had brought him fame as an artist in 1798. It was a subject he revisited throughout his career. The painting of the castle that hangs in Tate Britain, Norham Castle, Sunrise (1845), luminously near-abstract, is one of the great treasures of the collection.

Norham railway station, built 1851, closed in 1965 and was turned into a museum by its final station master, Peter Short. In 2013 it was up for sale at an asking price of £420,000.

== Governance ==
An electoral ward in the name of Norham and Islandshires exists. This ward stretches south east to just short of Bamburgh and has a total population taken at the 2011 Census of 4,438.

== Popular culture ==
Norham appears, under the name of Ubbanford, in The Bernicia Chronicles series of historical novels by Matthew Harffy, where it is the residence and seat of power of the series' protagonist, Beobrand.

== See also ==
- Ladykirk and Norham Bridge
- Norham Castle

== Sources ==
- Grundy, John (2022). History of Northumberland. Newcastle upon Tyne: Tyne Bridge Publishing. ISBN 9781838280970.
