= Cuthbert Arthur Brereton =

British civil engineer (1850–1910)

Cuthbert Arthur Brereton (17 September 1850 – 12 September 1910) was a civil engineer and a partner of Sir John Wolfe Barry. Together they completed numerous projects in England and Wales, the most prominent being the King Edward VII Bridge over the Thames at Kew, London.

Also with Barry he had been involved with the construction of Barry Docks and railways, the Middlesbrough Docks, the Surrey Commercial docks, and the great Northern, District & and Piccadilly underground lines. He had previously been resident engineer to the Llynvi and Ogmore Railways, and the Portcawl Docks and was afterwards assistant engineer on the London Inner Circle railway. He built the Ladykirk and Norham Bridge over the River Tweed. He was a lieut. colonel of the Engineer and Railway Staff Corps.

He was elected to the Smeatonian Society in 1896 and became their president in July 1909 until his death.

Born in Brinton, Cuthbert came from a Norfolk family that produced other notable Victorian engineers R.P. Brereton (Isambard Kingdom Brunel's Chief Assistant) and R.M.Brereton chief engineer on the Bombay, Nagpore, and Calcutta portion of the Great Indian Peninsular Railway, 1867–70, and advocate in the US Congress for the building of irrigation canals in California.
