= Ralph Robey =

English-born Australian politician and businessman

Ralph Mayer Robey (8 January 1809 – 1 April 1864), often "Ralph Meyer Robey", was an English-born Australian politician and businessman.

Robey was the son of William and Elizabeth Robey, and migrated to New South Wales in 1841. He ran a store and ironmongery in Sydney from 1843, and gradually expanded his business over the subsequent years. He was also involved in sugar growing and was one of the original shareholders of the Colonial Sugar Refining Company (CSR).

He set up a sugar refinery in opposition to CSR at Oyster Cove (Waverton), which failed when credit was curtailed under controversial circumstances. Financially embarrassed, Robey had to sell the enterprise to CSR at a loss, leading to dispute and litigation.

He served on the Sydney City Council from 1846 to 1847 and was a member of the New South Wales Legislative Council from 1858 to 1861 and from 1861 to his death at Longton in Staffordshire in 1864.

== Family ==
Robey married twice: first to Mary Ann Robey, née Leese, with whom he had five children, and died in 1841 on the way to Australia. On 21 October 1842 he married Louisa Townsend; they would have another five or more. She killed herself on 20 September 1889 by cutting her throat. Among their children were:

- Anne Maria Robey married George R. Dibbs in 1857.
- His third daughter Frances Emily Robey (died 22 June 1899) married Henry Edward Russell of Goulburn on 4 June 1870.
- His fourth daughter Louisa Gertrude Robey (c. 1847 – 29 March 1918), married George Alfred Russell at Valparaiso on 27 December 1866. George Alfred Russell and Henry Edward Russell were brothers.
