= Brereton =

Brereton may refer to:

== People ==
- Brereton (surname)

== Places ==
- Brereton, Barbados
- Brereton, Cheshire, England
  - Brereton Hall, Cheshire
- Brereton, Illinois, USA
- Brereton, Staffordshire, England
- Brereton Cross

== Other uses ==
- Baron Brereton, a title in the Peerage of Ireland
- Brereton House, official residence of the Principal of Karachi Grammar School, named after The Rev. Henry Brereton
- Brereton Social F.C., a football club based in Brereton in Rugeley, Staffordshire, England
