= Robert Pearson Brereton =

- Born: 4 April 1818
- Died: 1 September 1894 (aged 76)
- Occupation: railway engineer
- Known for: chief assistant to Isambard Kingdom Brunel

Robert Pearson Brereton (4 April 1818 – 1 September 1894) was an English railway engineer. He worked under Isambard Kingdom Brunel for more than twenty years and, following Brunel's death, completed many of his projects.

== Family ==
Robert Pearson Brereton came from a Norfolk family that produced other notable Victorian engineers Cuthbert Arthur Brereton (Sir John Wolfe Barry's partner) and Robert Maitland Brereton (chief engineer on part of the Great Indian Peninsular Railway and advocate in the US Congress for the building of irrigation canals in California).

== Brunel's assistant ==
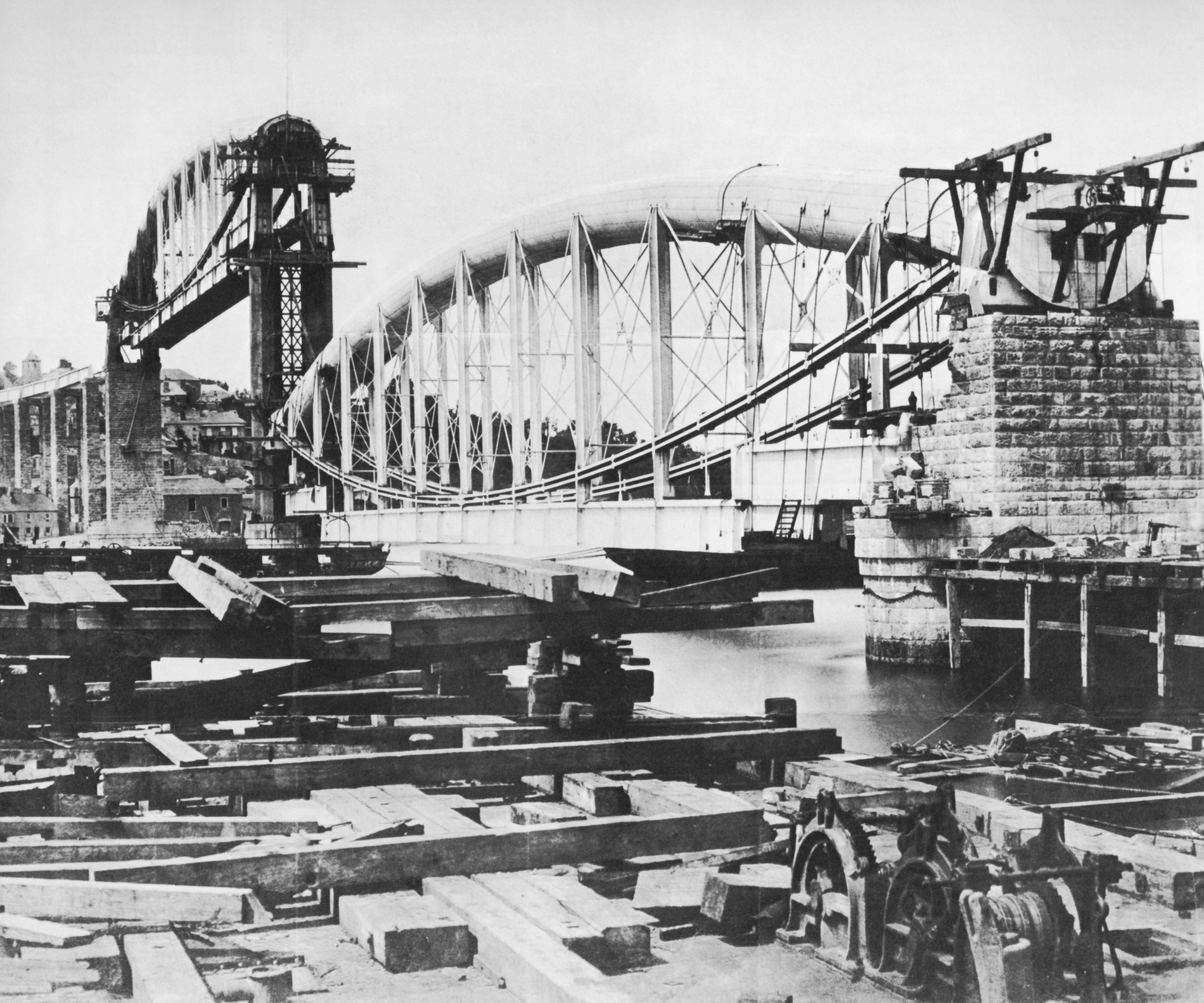
The Royal Albert Bridge after Brereton had floated the second span into position for jacking up to the top of the piers.

Brereton was recruited by Brunel staff in 1836 to be one of seven resident engineers supervising the construction of the Great Western Railway. He lost an eye in a work accident and is depicted in a portrait with an eye patch. After the Great Western railway was completed, he carried out similar tasks on other railways that Brunel was building. For example, in 1845 he was one of Brunel's resident engineers on the Cheltenham and Great Western Union Railway and was sent to Italy to sort out problems with the construction of the Turin–Genoa railway.

He became Brunel's chief assistant in 1847 and remained in this post until Brunel's death in 1859. His signature appears on drawings for the Chepstow Bridge which were prepared in Brunel's London office around 1850.

One of Brunel's major and long-running projects was the construction of the Royal Albert Bridge across the River Tamar for the Cornwall Railway. In 1854 Brereton was sent as Brunel's assistant to help William Glennie, the resident engineer on the bridge, who was in poor health. Much of his time in the next five years was spent on this project. He was instrumental in developing ways to excavate underwater to prepare for the construction of the central pier. In 1857 he assisted Brunel when the first span was floated into position, and he then supervised the lengthy process to raise it 100 feet (30 m) to the top of its piers. Brunel's poor health increasingly prevented him from attending work in Cornwall, and so Brereton supervised the floating out of the second span in 1858 without Brunel's help. He then saw through the raising of this span, the completion of the bridge and opening of the line in May 1859.

== After Brunel ==
After Brunel's death in September 1859 Brereton took over his role as chief engineer for many railway companies, designing new works and alterations. He ran his business from Brunel's old office in Duke Street, London, while Brunel's widow Mary continued to reside in the rooms above. Some of Brunel's railways were still under construction, including the

- Bristol and South Wales Union Railway
- Cornwall Railway
- Dartmouth and Torbay Railway
- West Somerset Railway

== Tributes and memorials ==
Brunel described Brereton in 1845 as "a peculiarly energetic persevering young man". The Chairman of the Cornwall Railway, speaking in 1859 following the opening of the Royal Albert Bridge, described him as "always ready, always able, always full of energy."

He has a memorial brass in the church in Blakeney.
