= Patrick Brereton =

Irish academic

Patrick Brereton is an author and academic at Dublin City University. He studies and teaches film, including a particular focus on the treatment of environmental issues.

== Selected works ==
- Hollywood Utopia: Ecology in Contemporary American Cinema, Intellect Press (2004) ISBN 1-841501-17-4
- Continuum Guide to Media Education, Bloomsbury Academic (2005) ISBN 0-8264-7773-9
- Historical Dictionary of Irish Cinema (With Roderick Flynn), The Scarecrow Press (2007) ISBN 0-8108-5557-7
