= Thomas Brereton (dramatist) =

English dramatist

Thomas Brereton (1691 – 1722), was an English dramatist.

== Early life and education ==
Brereton was descended from a younger branch of the noble family of Brereton in Cheshire. His father was Major Thomas Brereton of the Queen's Dragoons. He attended the free school of Chester, and a boarding school in the same city, kept by a Mr. Dennis, a French refugee. He earned a Bachelor of Arts degree from Brasenose College, Oxford in 1709.

== Career ==
His father died before he reached his majority, leaving him a considerable fortune, which, however, he soon dissipated, his wife and family being compelled by destitution to retire to their relations in Wales in 1721.

The same year, he received from the government a small office connected with the customs at Chester.

In connection with the election of a relative as a member of parliament for Liverpool he wrote a libellous attack on the rival candidate, and to escape prosecution was advised to abscond. To baffle pursuit he determined to cross the Saltney when the tide was coming in. In the middle of the stream he quit his horse, resolving to trust to his remarkable powers as a swimmer, but he was unable to reach the shore. His death took place in February 1722.

Brereton was the author of two tragedies, including Esther or, faith triumphant. A sacred tragedy and Sir John Oldcastle, or Love and Zeal, a Tragedy.

He also the publisher of:

- "A Day's Journey from the Vale of Evesham to Oxford, to which are added two Town Eclogues"
- "An English Psalm ... on the late Thanksgiving Day," 1716
- "George, a poem, humbly inscribed to the Right Honourable the Earl of Warrington,'"1715
- "Charnock Junior, or the Coronation, being a Parody on Mack Flecknoe, occasioned by Dr. S——1's late exploit at St. Andrews, 1719. This had been published in 1710, printed and without the author's knowledge. It is a burlesque on Dr. Sacheverell's progress after his trial.

== Personal life ==
He married Jane (b. 1685), daughter of Thomas Hughes of Bryn Griffith, Mold, Flintshire, on 29 Jan. 1711. Two daughters survived him.

His wife died at Wrexham on 7 Aug. 1740. She wrote a good deal of verse in The Gentleman's Magazine and elsewhere, which was collected after her death and published, together with some of her letters (1744).
