= Ian Ross Campbell =

Australian soldier and businessman

- Campbell in 1950
- Born: 23 March 1900; Moss Vale, New South Wales
- Died: 31 October 1997 (aged 97)
- Burial place: Bong Bong Presbyterian Cemetery, Moss Vale, New South Wales
- Spouses: Patience Russell (m. 1927; died 1961) Irene Cardamatis (m. 1967)
- Military career
- Allegiance: Australia
- Branch: Australian Army
- Service years: 1922–1957
- Rank: Major General
- Service number: VX21
- Commands: 2/1st Battalion; 34th Brigade
- Conflicts: Second World War; Western Desert campaign; Battle of Greece; Battle of Crete; Korean War
- Awards: Commander of the Order of the British Empire; Distinguished Service Order & Bar; Knight Commander of the Order of the Phoenix (Greece)

Major General Ian Ross Campbell, CBE, DSO & Bar (23 March 1900 – 31 October 1997) was an Australian soldier and businessman. He served during the Second World War and Korean War.

== Early life ==
Ian Ross Campbell was born in Moss Vale, New South Wales, on 23 March 1900, the younger of the two sons of Lieutenant Colonel Gerald Ross Campbell, a barrister and soldier, and his wife Mary Fraser née Stewart. He was educated at Tudor House School in Moss Vale and later at Scots College, Sydney. He entered the Royal Military College, Duntroon, on 26 March 1919. He won the Sword of Honour on graduation on 14 December 1922, and was commissioned as a second lieutenant.

On 20 August 1923, Campbell was posted to the 36th Battalion as its adjutant and quartermaster. From 9 September 1926 to 3 November 1926 he served on exchange in India with the Royal Scots Fusiliers of the British Army. He became a keen mountain climber, and participated in climbing on Mount Everest. On return to Australia, he was assigned to the headquarters of the 1st Division, and then was adjutant and quartermaster of the Sydney University Scouts. He married Patience A. Russell at St James' Church, Sydney, on 26 April 1927 and had a home "Pine Lodge" in Moss Vale. They had one daughter, Gillian on 22 April 1928. Patience was a daughter of barrister F. A. A. "Frank" Campbell KC.

Promoted to captain on 14 December 1930, Campbell served as aide de camp to the Governor of New South Wales from 11 November 1932 to 5 June 1934. He then became adjutant and quartermaster of the Queensland-based 26th Battalion, which was linked with the 15th Battalion to form the 15th/26th Battalion on 1 November 1934. He attended the Staff College, Camberley, in England from 15 November 1935 to 24 March 1938. On returning to Australia he became a staff officer in the Adjutant General's Branch.

== Second World War ==
On 13 October 1939, Campbell joined the Second Australian Imperial Force (AIF), and was given the AIF service number VX21. He was initially assigned to the 2/1st Battalion as a major, but became the brigade major of the 16th Brigade that same day. He was made a Companion of the Distinguished Service Order for his part in the Battle of Bardia. His citation read:

For conspicuous gallantry and devotion to duty during the period from 21st December 1940 to 4th January 1941 which period embraced the preparations for, and the capture of Bardia. During the preparation period in the face of the enemy and under enemy fire, this officer continually patrolled the area selected as the point of entry for the attack. His accurate and daring reconnaissance contributed largely to the selection of the Brigade Assembly Area and start line. He was responsible for taping the Assembly Area and also the start line on the night prior to the attack, and the success of the attack was greatly due to the thoroughness in which this job was done. During the attack, on 3rd and 4th January 1941, his behaviour under fire was exemplary, and each day he repeatedly contacted the Commanding Officers while under heavy fire, conveyed instructions, and by his own initiative directed the course of the battle according to plan. His presence on the battlefield was an inspiration, and considerably helped to prosecute the momentum of the attack.

Campbell became the commander of the 2/1st Battalion, with the temporary rank of lieutenant colonel on 8 April 1941, soon after he arrived on Crete. He took charge of a hastily assembled force of Australian troops from the 2/1st and 2/11th Battalions and Greek troops charged with the defence of Retimo airfield. For his role in the defence of the airfield, he was mentioned in despatches on 11 December 1942. He was awarded a bar to his Distinguished Service Order on 29 August 1946. His citation read:

Lt-Col. CAMPBELL was in command of a force of two AIF Bns at RETIMO CRETE in May 41. The role of this group was the denial of the RETIMO airstrip to the enemy. On 20 May a force of 1300–1500 paratroops was dropped to both flanks of and on top of the Australians. The Germans had powerful air support, and the Australians were isolated from the start from the rest of the garrison of Crete. Lt-Col CAMPBELL remained in command during ten days continuous and at times bitter hand to hand fighting. The Australians, with little ammunition and fighting largely with captured weapons, towards the end on quarter rations, attacked the enemy so persistently that by May 30 less than 130 Germans were still able to fight, 9 planes had been shot down by SA fire plus several others severely damaged. On 31 May the enemy was heavily reinforced from Suda Bay with tanks and artillery. Our force, its supplies exhausted, but its task till then fulfilled, was forced to surrender. Throughout the fighting, Lt-Col. CAMPBELL set an inspiring personal example and kept the morale of his troops at a high level. On May 21 he personally organised and commanded a most successful two company attack by 2/1 Bn, which largely due to his leadership recovered an important ridge lost the previous day. Lt-Col. CAMPBELL was captured on May 31.

He was also appointed a Knight Commander of the Order of the Phoenix by Greece.

Campbell was a prisoner of war in Germany until he was liberated on 14 April 1945. He commanded the reception camp for freed Australian prisoners from 11 May to 16 September 1945, with the temporary rank of brigadier, after which he returned to Australia, arriving back in Adelaide on 21 October 1945.

== Later life ==
On 19 November 1945, Campbell was appointed Deputy Adjutant General of the Australian Military Forces, with the substantive rank of lieutenant colonel from 30 September 1946. He was appointed the Director of Military Training at Army Headquarters with the temporary rank of brigadier on 1 March 1947, and the permanent rank of colonel from 18 October 1948. On 1 January 1949 he assumed command of the 34th Brigade, which became the 1st Brigade on 20 May 1949. He was in charge of the administrative headquarters of the Australian Forces in Korea and the British Commonwealth Occupation Force in Japan from 1951 to 1953. He was made a commander of the Order of the British Empire in the 1954 New Year Honours on 29 December 1953.

Campbell became the commandant of the Australian Army Staff College on 14 August 1953, and then of the Royal Military College, Duntroon, on 24 May 1954. He was promoted to the temporary rank of major general on 25 May 1954, which became substantive on 13 September 1954. He retired from the Army on 23 March 1957.

After leaving the Army, Campbell worked for James Hardie Industries. He later served as chairman of the New South Wales Red Cross, and worked for other charities. His wife Patience died in 1961. He married Irene Cardamatis in 1967.

Campbell died on 31 October 1997, and was buried in Bong Bong Presbyterian Cemetery in Moss Vale. The people of Crete sent an urn of soil from Crete that was buried with him.
