= Robert Maitland Brereton =

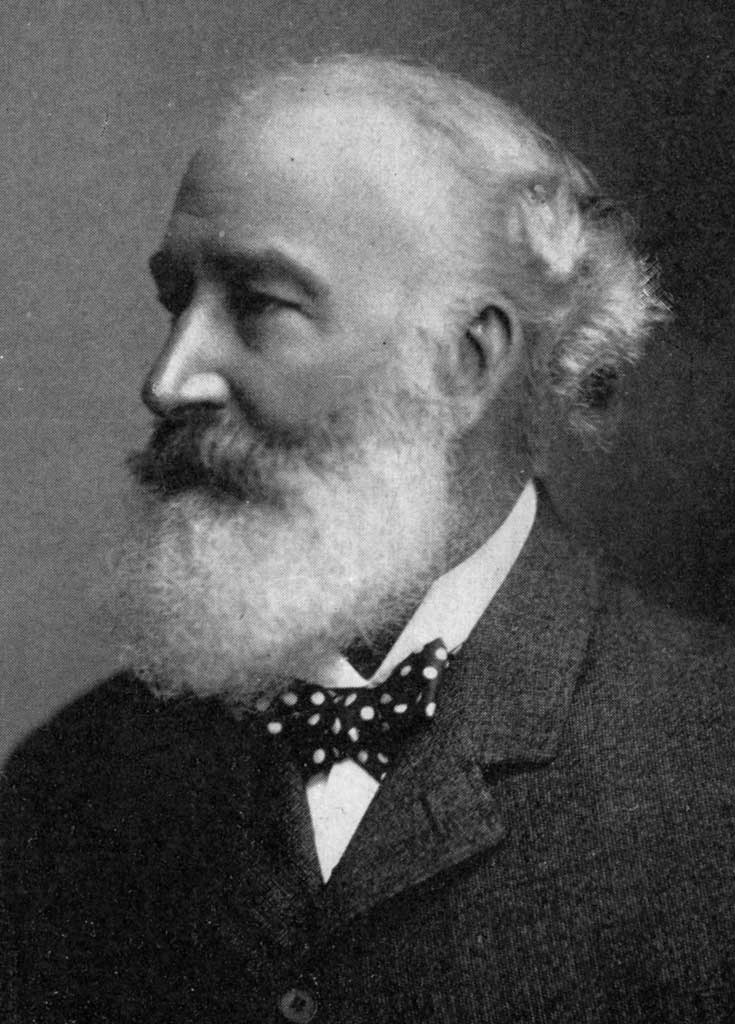

Robert Maitland Brereton (2 January 1834 – 7 December 1911) was an English railway engineer in India. In the United States he helped secure the first Act of Congress for the irrigation of California.

== Engineering training ==
In 1853 Brereton studied practical mechanics at King's College London, entering the field of civil engineering upon graduating. He joined Brunel's design team, of which Brereton's second cousin R.P. Brereton was also a member. He worked on the Royal Albert Bridge across the River Tamar at Saltash, and the construction of the Cornish railway.

Brereton was first employed in Brunel's office in Duke St, London from 1854 to 1855 where he witnessed the building of the SS Great Eastern. In 1856 he worked on the engineering of the new Paddington Station, including bridges, warehouses, iron girder work, rail laying, and hydraulic and other machineries.

== Great Indian Peninsula Railway ==
The large stone blocks to build viaducts were moved by gangs of about 20 men. The 100+ labourers in this picture give an idea of the scale of this vast undertaking.

Robert Maitland Brereton came to India in 1857 to work under Robert Graham as an assistant engineer. While there, he started work on the construction of the Bombay to Calcutta Railway, which was to form the backbone of the Indian Railways.

In January 1858 Brereton escaped death twice when his camp at the Sake River was attacked and looted by a band of 500 Bhils, during the unrest associated with the Indian mutiny.

As he gained promotions, Brereton was eventually appointed chief engineer for the Grand Indian Peninsular Railway and undertook to complete the strategic connection across the continent. This was accomplished in 1870, ahead of the promised schedule. Opening the railway from Bombay to Calcutta in March 1870, the Viceroy of India said, "...it may happen that a thousand years hence, Mr. Brereton's ghost may still hover with anxious solicitude over the unbroken piers of the Trowa Viaduct..."

== The irrigation of the San Joaquin valley ==
In 1871, following a severe drought in California, Brereton was called to San Francisco by William Chapman Ralston, cashier of the Bank of California. For the next five years, Brereton was employed on various projects for the irrigation of the San Joaquin Valley lands. He supervised the surveying of the area and produced a detailed plan of irrigation canals. He was sent to Washington to advocate the scheme, and in 1873 Congress set up a commission to make recommendations on the development of the irrigation. Brereton declined an invitation to serve on the commission, but he nevertheless assisted its members and his plans were those endorsed by the commission.

Brereton sought backing in Great Britain for both irrigation and emigration schemes in California. His 1872 pamphlet, Project for English Middle and Yeoman Class Colonies for California, described the productivity of the land and drew attention to the opportunities, including the welcome that would await immigrants.

== Surveyor of Norfolk County roads and bridges 1879-1885 ==
Brereton's next assignment was back in his home county in England; operating in a new position created by an Act of Parliament, he was to manage the county's roads. In so doing, he had to overcome those people who had lived their live under the parochial system of road management and wanted good roads but begrudged their cost. He succeeded, and when he left the post, the Prince of Wales was amongst those signing his testimonial of appreciation.

== Commissioner of the Highlands of Scotland 1886-1888 ==
Brereton's next appointment was made by the third Duke of Sutherland and involved Brereton acting as the Duke's agent in encouraging crofters to take opportunities to resettle in Canada.

== Family background ==
R.M. Brereton came from Little Massingham in Norfolk, from a family that produced other notable Victorian engineers Cuthbert Arthur Brereton (Sir John Wolfe Barry's partner) and Robert Pearson Brereton, Brunel's chief assistant.

He married Alice Fairchild of Waterloo, New York, and together they had four children. In retirement he lived in Portland, Oregon.

In Oregon, he examined the Question: Did Sir Francis Drake Land on Any Part of the Oregon Coast?
