= Ernest Le Gay Brereton =

Ernest Le Gay Brereton (10 April 1869 – 4 August 1932) was an Australian mining engineer and lecturer at the University of Sydney.

== History ==
Brereton was born in Macquarie Street, Sydney, a son of Dr John Le Gay Brereton (1827–1886) and his wife Mary Le Gay Brereton, née Tongue, twelve years after their arrival at Melbourne aboard Dover Castle on 25 July 1859.

Brereton was educated at Sydney Grammar School and Christ's College, Christchurch, New Zealand, and after working at the goldfields of New South Wales studied engineering and metallurgy part-time at the University of Sydney. In 1908 he was appointed demonstrator in chemistry at the University of Sydney. and after being awarded a BSc. for his research into the formation of gold deposits in New South Wales was promoted to lecturer, and held that post for 24 years.

He died at his home, Eastern Road, Turramurra, after some years of declining health. His remains were cremated at Rookwood Cemetery.

== Memberships ==
- Associate, Institution of Mining and Metallurgy 1913
- Member, Australian Chemical Institute
- Member, Royal Society of New South Wales

== Other interests ==
Brereton was a keen rifle shooter, for many years president of the University Rifle Club.

== Personal ==
Ernest Le Gay Brereton married Lorna Beatrice Russell in Melbourne on 2 June 1910. Their children included one daughter and two sons.

He was an older brother of the poet John Le Gay Brereton (1871–1933)
