= William Brereton (planter) =

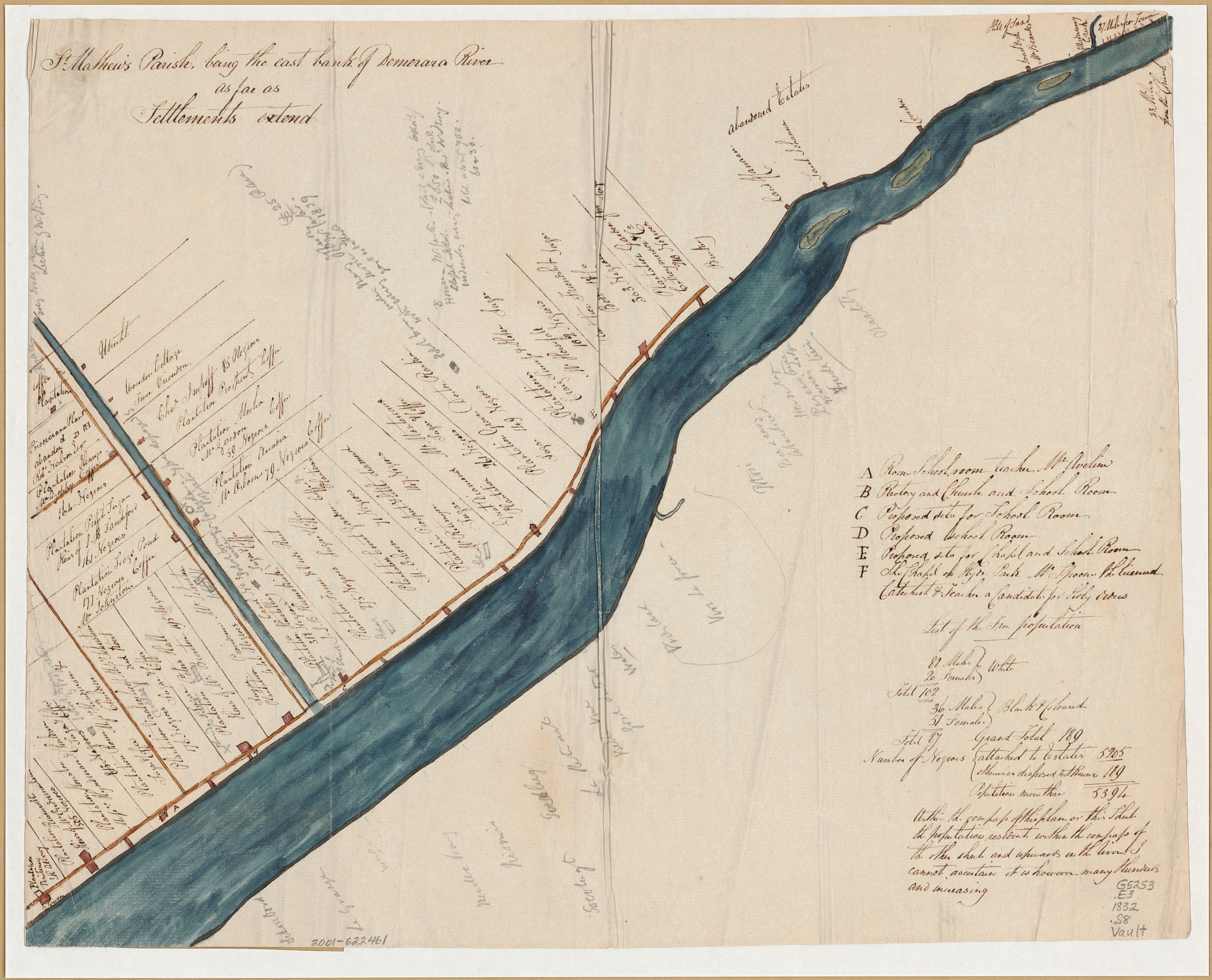
Plantation Peter's Hall (marked B, bottom left) on a map of St. Mathew's Parish, Demerara River east bank, 1832.

William Brereton (died 21 October 1822) was a planter in British Guiana in the early 19th century. He was of Irish descent, the son of William Brereton of Mountrath.

He was the owner of the Peter's Hall and Westside plantations and the joint owner of the Taymouth plantation, all in Essequebo, British Guiana.
