= John Brereton (footballer) =

Australian rules footballer (1934–2021)

Personal information
- Full name: John Phyland Brereton
- Born: 8 October 1934
- Died: 17 April 2021 (aged 86)
- Original team: Cohuna
- Height: 180 cm (5 ft 11 in)
- Weight: 78 kg (172 lb)

Playing career^{1}
Years	Club	Games (Goals)
1959–60	Footscray	17 (0)
- ^{1} Playing statistics correct to the end of 1960.

John Phyland Brereton (8 October 1934 – 17 April 2021) was an Australian rules footballer who played with Footscray in the Victorian Football League (VFL).
