= William Brereton (British Army officer) =

British Army officer (1789–1864)

Lieutenant-General Sir William Brereton KCB KH
- Born: 29 December 1789
- Died: 27 July 1864 (aged 74); Albany, London
- Military career
- Allegiance: Great Britain
- Branch: British Army
- Service years: 1803–1864
- Rank: Lieutenant-General
- Unit: Royal Artillery
- Conflicts: Napoleonic War; First Opium War; Crimean War
- Awards: Knight Commander of the Order of the Bath; Knight of the Royal Guelphic Order

Lieutenant-General Sir William Brereton KCB KH (29 December 1789 – 27 July 1864) was a British Army officer who served as colonel-commandant of the 4th Brigade, Royal Horse Artillery in the 1860s.

== Family ==
Brereton was descended from the Cheshire family of Brereton of Brereton Hall, through the Irish branch, the Breretons of Carrigslaney, County Carlow, of whom some details were given by Sir Fortunatus Dwarris in Archæologia, vol. xxxiii., and in Mervyn Archdall's edition of Lodge's Peerage of Ireland, ii. 251. In a biographical notice he is described as a son of Major William Brereton, who fought at Culloden, and younger half-brother of Major-General Robert Brereton of New Abbey, County Kildare (formerly of 30th and 63rd regiments), and Lieutenant-Governor of St. Lucia, who died in 1818.

== Early life and military career ==
Brereton was born in 1789, and entered the Royal Military Academy as a "Gentleman Cadet" in 1803, passing out on 10 May 1805 as a second lieutenant in the Royal Artillery, and gaining promotion to first lieutenant on 7 June 1806. He served in the Peninsular and Waterloo campaigns from December 1809 to June 1815, including the defence of Cádiz, where he commanded the guns at Fort Matagorda, the battle of Barrosa, where he was wounded, the Burgos retreat, the battles of Vitoria and the Pyrenees, the siege of San Sebastián, where he was temporarily attached to the breaching batteries, the battles of Orthez, Toulouse, Quatre Bras, and Waterloo. During the greater part of the time, he was one of the subalterns of the famous "H Troop" of the Royal Horse Artillery commanded by Major W. Norman Ramsay, with which he was severely wounded at Waterloo. He became a second captain on 5 November 1816, and was placed on half-pay the year after. On 23 January 1819, while still on half-pay, he was promoted to major. He was brought on full pay again in 1823, and, performed further varied service at home and in the colonies. He was invested as a Knight of the Royal Guelphic Order in 1837 and as a Companion of the Order of the Bath in 1838. Brereton served as inspector-general of the Irish Constabulary between 1839 and 1843, being promoted to lieutenant-colonel on 17 August 1843.

He was then sent to China, where he was second in command under General George D'Aguilar in the 1847 punitive expedition to the Bocca Tigris, and at the capture of the city of Canton. He received promotion to colonel in November 1851. During the early part of the Crimean War, Brereton, who was then on the strength of the horse brigade at Woolwich, was present with the Black Sea fleet, as a guest on board HMS Britannia, carrying the flag of his relative, Vice-Admiral Sir James Dundas, and directed the fire of her rockets in the attack upon the forts of Sevastopol on 17 October 1854.

He was appointed the Colonel Commandant of the Royal Artillery on 12 April 1864, and was promoted to major-general on 16 December the same year. He was made a Knight Commander of the Order of the Bath in 1861.

Brereton, having had been promoted to the rank of lieutenant-general a few days before, died at his chambers in the Albany, London, on 27 July 1864, aged seventy-four. In his will, executed on 10 April 1850, and proved on 16 August 1864 (personalty sworn under £25,000), he left the sum of £1000, the interest to be applied in perpetuity to encourage the game of cricket among the non-commissioned officers of horse and foot artillery stationed at Woolwich.

== Publications ==
- The British Fleet in the Black Sea, (1857?) privately printed
- Selections from Paixhans' Constitution Militaire de France, (1850) in the Proceedings of the Royal Artillery Institution., vol. i. (1857).
