= Knutsford Town Hall =

Municipal building in Knutsford, Cheshire, England

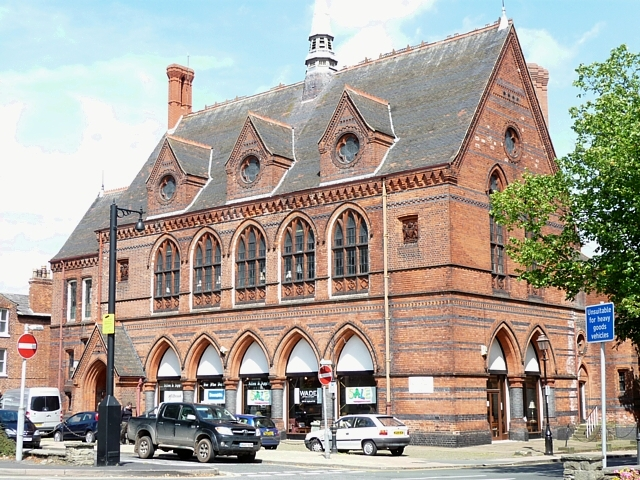
- Knutsford Town Hall

- Shown in Cheshire
- 53.3032°N 2.3740°W
- Location: Princess Street, Knutsford

History
- Built: 1871

Site notes
- Architect: Alfred Waterhouse
- Architectural style: Gothic Revival style

Listed Building – Grade II
- Official name: Former Town Hall
- Designated: 15 January 1974
- Reference no.: 1378496

Knutsford Town Hall is a former municipal building in Princess Street, Knutsford, Cheshire, England. The structure, which for a long time was used as an events venue, is a Grade II listed building.

== History ==
The town hall was a gift to the town from the lord of the manor, the 1st Lord Egerton who lived at Tatton Hall. It was designed by Alfred Waterhouse in the Gothic Revival style, built by J. Parnell & Sons in red brick with blue brick dressings and was completed in 1871. The design involved a symmetrical main frontage with seven bays facing Princess Street; it was arcaded on the ground floor, so that markets could be held, with a large assembly room on the first floor. The second bay on the left featured a prominent porch with a gable. The arcade of five bays to the right incorporated arched openings supported by blue brick columns, while the first floor featured a row of three-light gothic windows flanked by panels containing coats of arms. The attic floor featured three dormer windows with quatrefoil glazing and, at roof level, there was a central spirelet.

The town hall was latterly mainly used as an events venue. Knutsford Urban District Council, formed in 1895, was initially based at offices in King Street but after Knutsford Prison closed in 1913, moved its main departments to the former Governor's House, just 200 yards (180 m) to the south of the town hall on Toft Road. While the ground floor of the town hall continued to be used for markets, the first floor was converted for use as a boys' club and an education centre: exhibits in the education centre included the 4th Lord Egerton's collection of military weapons and natural history items.

Shortly before the Normandy landings in June 1944, General George S. Patton, delivered a speech in Knutsford which was perceived to be critical of the Soviet Union, and to have "slap(ped) the face of every one of the United Nations except Great Britain"; these events were depicted in the film Patton: Lust for Glory, with George C. Scott in the title role, scenes from which were filmed in front of the town hall in 1969. The town hall was subsequently acquired by the conservationist, Randle Brooks. Brookes in turn leased it to a local furniture shop owner, Derek Panagakis, for use as a furniture showroom in 1973. The building fell empty in 2011 but was converted for public house use at a cost of £2 million by The Revere Pub Company in 2016; it now operates as a public house known as "Lost and Found".

== See also ==
- Listed buildings in Knutsford
