= Millington, Cheshire =

Former civil parish in Cheshire, England

Coordinates: 53.358°N 2.410°W

Millington
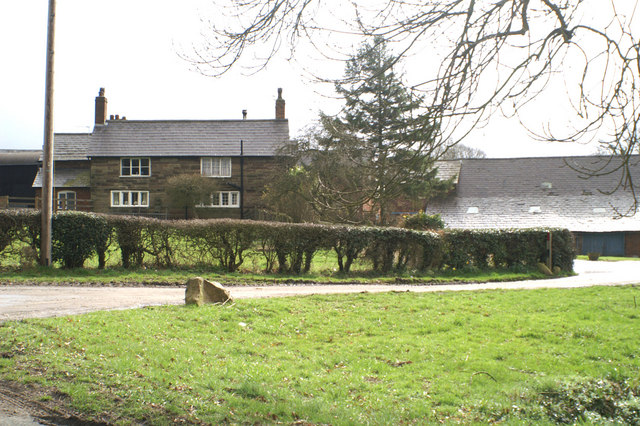
- Moss Farm House, Millington

- Location within Cheshire
- Population: 234 (2011)
- OS grid reference: SJ728847
- Civil parish: Millington and Rostherne; Little Bollington with Agden
- Unitary authority: Cheshire East
- Ceremonial county: Cheshire
- Region: North West
- Country: England
- Sovereign state: United Kingdom
- Post town: Altrincham
- Postcode district: WA14
- Police: Cheshire
- Fire: Cheshire
- Ambulance: North West
- UK Parliament: Tatton

Millington is a former civil parish, now in the parishes of Millington and Rostherne and Little Bollington with Agden, in the Cheshire East district, in the ceremonial county of Cheshire, England. The parish was 8 miles (13 km) from Warrington and 3 miles (5 km) from Altrincham. Its name is a "relic of Saxon clanship – the ton or town of the Millings". The parish is primarily agricultural, with a number of farms including Moss House Farm, Newhall Farm, Mereside Farm, Boothbank Farm and Stonedelph Farm. Millington has been recently described on Britain Streets as a "hamlet or isolated settlement in the inhabited countryside". Millington is situated within the market town Macclesfield. The M56 motorway was close to the parish, which allows travel into areas of Warrington and Manchester, 13 miles (21 km) and 14 miles (23 km) away respectively. In 2011 the parish had a population of 234.

== History ==
Millington was a township in Rostherne ancient parish, Bucklow hundred (SJ 7284). The parish includes the hamlets of Arthill, Boothbank and Bucklow Hill. It became a civil parish in 1866, on 1 April 2023 the parish was abolished to form "Millington and Rostherne", part also went to "Little Bollington with Agden". The ancient parish church for Millington is St Mary's Church, Rostherne. It originally aided for the following townships of High Legh, Marthall cum Warford, Mere, Over Peover, Over Tabley, Rostherne, Snelson and Tatton, and parts of the townships of Agden and Bollington as well. It was described in 1892: "The village of Millington is small, and located three miles north-east from Pocklington, which is the nearest railway station".

The Parish Council is the local government for the residents of Millington. Millington is similar to other parishes formed around a village or other small settlement, and was to be centred on the parish church. However, in the late 1800s the church and state separated; this area is represented by the Millington Parish Council. Millington is mentioned in the Domesday Book. It is clear that Millington paid little tax compared to other settlements with the total tax assessed classified as small (0.5 geld units).

In the 1870s, Millington was described as:

"A township in Rostherne parish, Cheshire; 4 miles SW of Altrincham. Acres, 736. Real property, £1,728. Pop., 338. Houses, 57. There are chapels for Independents, Baptists, and Wesleyans, and two good boarding-schools."

== Population ==
Population of Millington, 1881 to 2011

According to the 2011 Census it had a population of 234; in 2001 the population had been 244. The first Census to be noted in 1881, 130 years earlier, recorded the population of Millington to be 266 people. This is a similar figure to that taken from the last Census data. In 1901, there was a decrease to 225, which remains low in the Census 10 years later. It is evident that from 1921 onward that there was a steady increase in population, reaching its peak in 1951 with a total of 324 people. This could be due to the post-World War II Baby Boom from 1943 until 1960.

Moving into the early 20th century, declining fertility and improved life expectancy contributes to the population change in Britain. There is then a steady decrease to the current population of 234, which is one of lowest figures noted. This decrease could be due to urbanisation, where people migrate from rural, remote villages to urban cities for job opportunities and a better quality of life.

The 2011 Census shows that the median age is 52.3. The highest category is 45–59 which accounts for 46 percent of the population, almost half. The categories 60–64 and 65–74 are also high at 29 percent, classifying the parish as having an "Ageing Population". An ageing population results from an increase in life expectancy and declining fertility. However, as Millington is a small, remote parish allowing a close community, people choose to stay rather than retiring elsewhere. Its population classification is noted as countryside:agriculture.

== Housing and industry ==
The 1901 population census showed that population densities were ultimately higher in the towns, where there was an average of 5.4 persons per house, than in the rural areas, which had an average of 4.6. The Vision of Britain census data from the years 1881 to 1961 has not changed significantly. From 1881 until 1931, the results from the census of 'Total Houses' showed similar figures to the 1950s and 1960s, until 1951 where the number rose to 94 houses in total. In the recent 2011 Census the total was 93.

In the 2011 Census 44% of residents in Millington lived in detached housing, the most popular accommodation type. Semi detached housing accounts for 41%. Property prices in Millington are therefore above average to very high.

A Vision of Britain through time describes Millington from the first Census in 1801 as 'chiefly employed in Agriculture' and 'chiefly employed in trade, manufacturers or handicraft'. The 1881 Census report outlines the occupations of Millington at this time. The most common occupation for males was agriculture with 40 people working in this industry. Women were more likely to work in domestic service or offices; however, it was evident that a lot of female occupations were 'unknown' or not recorded. In the 2011 Census report, the most popular occupation for males was in wholesale: repair of motor vehicles, with 20 people working in this industry. Agriculture has declined to only 6 people. The majority of females work in health and social services. The types of occupation popular in the last census still show that the residents of Millington are focused within the community, with few having to commute for their job.

== Climate ==
Millington average temperatures from 1981 to 2010

The graph on the left shows the average high temperatures and low temperatures from 1981 to 2010. These averages can be compared to the United Kingdom as a whole. It is evident that Millington's maximum temperatures are higher than those of the UK, for example, across the summer months of June, July and August there is a 1–2.5 degrees Celsius difference between the two sets of data. The winter months of November, December and January, Millington is cooler than the average temperature of the United Kingdom, for example the minimum temperature is 1.1 degrees Celsius compared to Millington's 0.6.

== See also ==
- Listed buildings in Millington and Rostherne
