= Richard Alfred Davenport =

Richard Alfred Davenport (1777–1852) was an English miscellaneous writer.

== Life ==
Davenport was born in Lambeth on 18 January 1777, and started work as a writer in London at an early age. In the late 1790s he knew John Britton and Peter Lionel Courtier through a debating society, the "School of Eloquence".

Davenport wrote large portions of the history, biography, geography, and criticism in Rivington's Annual Register for several years (1792 to 1797, according to John Britton). He edited, with lives, a number of the British poets for the Chiswick Press edition in 100 volumes (1822); the biographies were supplied from the existing ones Samuel Johnson, with Davenport, Samuel Weller Singer, and some others, writing the rest. Later he did much work for Thomas Tegg.

For the last 11 years of his life Davenport lived at Brunswick Cottage, Park Street, Camberwell, a freehold house of which he was the owner. Here he lived and working alone, drinking large quantities of laudanum, in some squalor at the end. On Sunday, 25 January 1852, a passing policeman was attracted by someone moaning. He broke into the house and discovered Davenport unconscious, with a laudanum bottle in his hand. He died before anything could be done for him. An inquest found his death to be an accidental overdose.

== Works ==
=== Biography ===
Besides his work for the Chiswick Press Poets, Davenport compiled A Dictionary of Biography (1831), and produced an edition of Matthew Pilkington's General Dictionary of Painters (1852).

=== Other works ===
Davenport also wrote:

- New Elegant Extracts, 2nd series, Chiswick, 12 vols. 1823–7;
- The Commonplace Book of Epigrams, a collection in which some pieces are original, Edinburgh, 1825.
- Sketches of Imposture, Deception, and Credulity , London, 1837.

To Murray's Family Library Davenport contributed:

- The Life of Ali Pasha of Tepeleni, Vizier of Epirus, surnamed Aslan or the Lion, 1837;
- The History of the Bastile and of its principal Captives, 1838, several editions;
- Narratives of Peril and Suffering, 2 vols. 1840, new edition, New York, 1846;
- Lives of Individuals who raised themselves from Poverty to Eminence and Fortune, 1841.

Davenport translated many works, and contributed to periodical literature articles on biography, poetry, criticism, and other subjects. He was also a writer of verse. Some of it was set to music, by his friend Timothy Essex.

Editorial roles included the works of William Robertson the historian, with life, 1824; William Mitford's History of Greece, with continuation to the death of Alexander, 1835; and some works like William Guthrie's Geographical, Historical, and Commercial Grammar, and William Enfield's Speaker.

== Family ==
Davenport married in 1800; they later separated, and she became a novelist under her married name Selina Davenport. They had two daughters together; a son Theodore Alfred Davenport was not from this marriage. Elizabeth Gaskell encountered Selina Davenport in Knutsford around 1850.
