= Listed buildings in Knutsford =

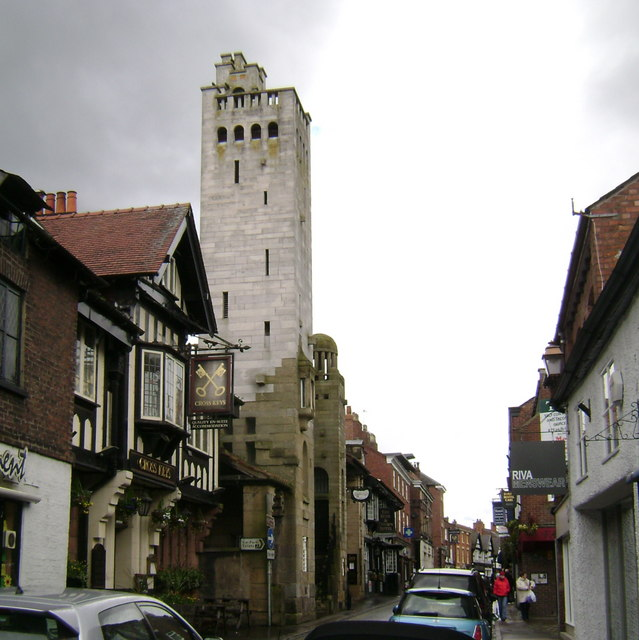
King Street, showing the Gaskell Memorial Tower

Knutsford is a market town in Cheshire East, England. Historically, its two main streets are Princess Street and King Street, which still contain 17th and 18th-century houses and shops, and Georgian buildings. The prosperity of the town grew with the arrival of the railway, and this resulted in the building of large houses to the south of the town, including the eccentric villas designed by Richard Harding Watt.

This list contains all the structures included in the National Heritage List for England in Knutsford. There is one listed at Grade I, the 17th-century Brook Street Chapel, which is the burial place of the novelist Mrs Gaskell. Two Anglican churches, St John the Baptist, dating from the 18th century and Neoclassical in style, and the 19th-century Gothic Revival Church of St Cross, are listed at Grade II*, together with five other buildings. The rest of the listed buildings are in Grade II.

== Key ==
Grade	Criteria
Grade I	Buildings of exceptional interest, sometimes considered to be internationally important.
Grade II*	Particularly important buildings of more than special interest.
Grade II	Buildings of national importance and special interest.

== Listed buildings ==
Name and location	Photograph	Date	Notes	Grade
48 King Street; 53.3038°N 2.3727°W		16th century (or earlier)	Originally a timber-framed house, later in commercial use, it was refronted in 1907. It has two storeys and a slate roof.	II
84 and 86 King Street; 53.3051°N 2.3740°W	—	16th century (probable)	A timber-framed house with a slate roof, its exterior partly painted. It incorporates some close studding. Alterations and extensions were made to it in the 19th and 20th centuries. It is in the form of an H-plan.	II
88 King Street; 53.3052°N 2.3740°W	—	16th century (probable)	A timber-framed house with a slate roof, later a shop. The upper storey is jettied.	II
White Bear Public House; 53.3047°N 2.3763°W		Late 16th century (probable)	The building was refurbished in the early 20th century. It is timber-framed, encased in rendered mock timberwork, and has a thatched roof.	II
57, 59, and 61 King Street; 53.3039°N 2.3725°W		Late 16th century or early 17th century	Originally three houses, later three shops. Timber-framed with rendering at the front, the roofs are in slate. Inside is decorative plasterwork dating from about 1630.	II
38, 40 and 42 King Street; 53.3032°N 2.3718°W		Early 17th century	A row of three timber-framed cottages, later altered, especially in about 1920. It has a shingle roof with five dormer windows.	II
43 and 45 King Street; 53.3037°N 2.3722°W		Early 17th century	A timber-framed house with brick infill and a slate roof.	II
Outbuildings, Old Court House, Chelford Road; 53.2968°N 2.3619°W	—	Early 17th century	Probably originated as stables; timber-framed with brick infill.	II
29 Chelford Road; 53.2974°N 2.3606°W	—	Early 17th century (probable)	A timber-framed cottage with a thatched roof; it probably originally had a single-room plan.	II
Old Court House and West Court, Chelford Road; 53.2971°N 2.3618°W	—	Early 17th century (probable)	Initially a single house, later divided into two houses. The original part, now rendered, was probably timber-framed, and the later part is in brick.	II
White Lion, 94 King Street; 53.3055°N 2.3742°W		17th century	Timber-framed with some rebuilding and refronting in brick. It is in the form of an H-plan and has a slate roof.	II
131 King Street; 53.3067°N 2.3739°W		Late 17th century	Originally a house, later converted into offices. It is in two storeys, constructed in painted brick, and has a slate roof. Its façade is in Artisan Mannerist style.	II
95 King Street; 53.3049°N 2.3736°W	—	Late 17th century (possible)	A three-storey painted brick house with a slate roof, later in commercial use, and much altered.	II
Brook Street Chapel; 53.3017°N 2.3701°W		1689	This is a brick building with a stone-slate roof, expressed externally in two storeys, but interiorly is a single cell. The chapel was attended by Mrs Gaskell, who is buried in the churchyard. It is in use as a Unitarian chapel.	I
93 King Street; 53.3048°N 2.3734°W	—	1697	A timber-framed house encased in brick, later in commercial use. It has two storeys and an attic.	II
68, 70 and 70A King Street; 53.3045°N 2.3734°W	—	1701	Originally a terrace of two or three houses, later two shops. Built in brick with a slate roof in three storeys.	II
50 King Street; 53.3039°N 2.3727°W		1721	A 2½-storey house in brick with a slate roof, later converted for commercial use.	II
1 and 2 Church Hill; 53.3035°N 2.3729°W		Early 18th century	A three-storey painted brick house with a slate roof, later divided into two dwellings and used as offices. The principal entrance is in the centre and has a Gibbs surround. The windows are sashes with twelve panes.	II
125 King Street; 53.3061°N 2.3740°W	—	Early 18th century	A house, possibly originally an inn, part of which has since been used as offices. It is constructed in brick with stone dressings, and has a slate roof. An arched entry leads to the rear yard.	II*
St John the Baptist's Church; 53.3031°N 2.3729°W		1741–44	The church was designed in neoclassical style by J. Garlive. It is constructed in brick with stone dressings, and has a slate roof. In 1879 the chancel was extended and reordered by Alfred Darbyshire.	II*
3 and 5 Brook Lane; 53.3007°N 2.3689°W	—	1742	Originally a single house, now divided into two dwellings. It has two storeys, is built in brick, and has a slate roof.	II
Booths Hall; 53.29833°N 2.35142°W		1745	A small country house, later exended by Edward Habershon. It is in orange brick with stone dressings, and has two storeys, nine bays, a central portico and a balustraded parapet.	II
16 Gaskell Avenue; 53.3038°N 2.3783°W	—	Mid-18th century	A brick house with a slate roof in two and three storeys, with later additions.	II
Heathwaite, 17 Gaskell Avenue; 53.3038°N 2.3785°W		Mid-18th century	A brick house with a slate roof in two and three storeys, with later additions. The childhood home of Mrs Gaskell. The gate and railings to the front garden dating from the 19th century are also listed.	II
Heath House, 19 and 20 Gaskell Avenue; 53.3038°N 2.3785°W	—	Mid-18th century	A house in roughcast brick with a slate roof in three storeys forming two dwellings.	II
Hollingford House, 1 Toft Road; 53.3025°N 2.3735°W		Mid-18th century	Built as a house, later converted into a shop.	II
Lord Eldon Public House, Tatton Street; 53.3055°N 2.3753°W		Mid-18th century	Originally a house with a baffle entry, it is constructed in brick, and has a slate roof and three-light casement windows throughout. Later converted into a public house.	II
Obelisk, Chelford Road; 53.2949°N 2.3570°W	—	Mid-18th century	A square pillar in rusticated stone, thought to be a memorial to the Legh family.	II
Beson Hill Cottage and Rose Cottage, Tabley Road; 53.3103°N 2.3924°W	—	Mid-18th century (probable)	A pair of cottages in two storeys, constructed in brick with thatched roofs.	II
98 King Street; 53.3060°N 2.3743°W	—	c. 1750	Originally a house, later converted into offices. It is in red brick with a slate roof, and has three storeys.	II*
Freemasons Arms Public House [now Six Knutsford] 53.3041°N 2.3745°W		1754	This was built as a silk mill, converted into three dwellings in 1818, and then into a public house in the 1890s. The three-storey building is constructed in brick with a slate roof.	II
113 King Street; 53.3056°N 2.3739°W	—	1763	Originally a three-storey house, later converted into offices. Built in brick with a slate roof.	II
15 King Street; 53.3028°N 2.3712°W		Late 18th century	A painted brick house with a slate roof in two storeys.	II
17 and 19 King Street; 53.3029°N 2.3713°W		Late 18th century	A pair of three-storey brick houses with slate roofs, later converted into two shops with offices above.	II
31 and 33 King Street; 53.3032°N 2.3717°W		Late 18th century	A brick house with a slate and stone-flagged roof in three storeys, later converted into two shops with offices above.	II
108–116 King Street; 53.3067°N 2.3743°W		Late 18th century	A terrace of five cottages in painted brick with a tiled roof.	II
115, 117, 117A and 117B King Street; 53.3058°N 2.3740°W	—	Late 18th century	A terrace of four houses, later converted into shops and offices. In brick with stone dressings and a slate roof, it has three storeys and an attic.	II
1 and 3 Princess Street; 53.3034°N 2.3743°W		Late 18th century	Originally a house, later converted into a pair of shops. Constructed in brick with a slate roof, it is in three storeys.	II
10A Princess Street; 53.3038°N 2.3751°W		Late 18th century	Originally a house, later a shop. In two storeys, it is constructed in brick with a slate roof.	II
Angel Hotel, 96 King Street; 53.3057°N 2.3742°W	—	Late 18th century	Originally a coaching inn, later a public house. Built in brick with stone dressings and a slate roof, it is in three storeys.	II
Royal George Hotel, King Street; 53.3051°N 2.3740°W	—	Late 18th century	Built as a coaching inn, later a hotel. It is in brick with a slate roof, and has a plan of three parallel ranges.	II
Park House, 129 King Street; 53.3066°N 2.3740°W		Late 18th century	A three-storey house, later converted into offices, constructed in brick with a slate roof.	II
Paradise Green Cottages; Toft Road; 53.2977°N 2.3709°W		Late 18th century	A row of three two-storey cottages built in brick with slate roofs with small gabled timber porches.	II
Sundial; 53.3029°N 2.3737°W		Late 18th century (probable)	In the churchyard of St John's is a stone baluster sundial on a plinth. The disc is missing.	II
21 and 23 King Street; 53.3031°N 2.3714°W		Late 18th century or early 19th century	A pair of brick houses with slate roofs in three storeys.	II
76, 78 and 80 King Street; 53.3049°N 2.3738°W	—	1785	A terrace of three houses, later converted for use as shops. In three storeys, and built in brick with a slate roof.	II
119, 121 and 123 King Street; 53.3059°N 2.3740°W	—	1785	A terrace of three houses, later converted for use as shops. In three storeys, and built in brick with a slate roof.	II
Park Cottage, Chelford Road; 53.2986°N 2.3623°W	—	Late 18th century or early 19th century	A two-storey house in painted brick with a slate roof.	II
Ice house, Booths Hall; 53.29751°N 2.35147°W	—	Mid to late 18th century or early 19th century	The ice house is in brick, and consists of a circular ice chamber with a short, straight entrance passage.	II
Bank, 82 King Street; 53.3051°N 2.3740°W	—	c. 1800	Constructed in brick with slate roofs, it is in three storeys.	II
90 King Street; 53.3052°N 2.3740°W	—	c. 1800	Originally a house, later in commercial use. Constructed in brick with a slate roof, it has three storeys.	II
12 Princess Street; 53.3038°N 2.3751°W		c. 1800	Originally a house, later a shop; it is constructed in brick with a slate roof, and has three storeys.	II
Knutsford Lodge Gateway; 53.3086°N 2.3737°W		1810	Designed by Lewis Wyatt as an entrance to Tatton Park in ashlar stone. It consists of a triple gateway and a lodge on the west side. Each gateway contains a cast iron gate. The central gateway is flanked by Doric columns supporting an entablature.	II*
Sessions House, Toft Road; 53.3023°N 2.3743°W		1815–18	Designed by George Moneypenny as part of the gaol. It is constructed in ashlar stone with a portico of four Ionic columns, and has a bell-turret.	II*
2 and 4 King Street; 53.3025°N 2.3710°W		c. 1820–30	A pair of two-storey stuccoed brick houses with a slate roof.	II
6 King Street; 53.3026°N 2.3711°W		c. 1820–30	A three-storey brick house with a slate roof.	II
8–14 King Street; 53.3027°N 2.3713°W		c. 1820–30	Originally a row of four two-storey brick houses with a slate roof, later converted into three shops.	II
16, 18 and 20 King Street; 53.3027°N 2.3714°W		c. 1820–30	Originally a row of three two-storey partly painted brick houses with a slate roof, two of which have been converted into shops.	II
1 and 2 Gaskell Avenue; 53.3045°N 2.3768°W		Early 19th century	A pair of two-storey brick houses with a slate roof.	II
3 and 4 Gaskell Avenue; 53.3045°N 2.3769°W		Early 19th century	A pair of two-storey brick houses with a slate roof.	II
22 King Street; 53.3030°N 2.3716°W		Early 19th century	A two-storey brick house over a basement with a slate roof.	II
24 King Street; 53.3030°N 2.3717°W		Early 19th century	A two-storey painted brick terrace house over a basement with a slate roof, later converted into a shop with accommodation above.	II
2–8 Minshull Street; 53.3056°N 2.3748°W	—	Early 19th century	A row of four shops in brick with slate roofs stepped down a slope.	II
26 Northwich Road; 53.3033°N 2.3864°W	—	Early 19th century	This was originally a toll house. It is a single-storey building in rendered brick with an overhanging slate roof.	II
4, 4A and 6 Princess Street; 53.3036°N 2.3749°W		Early 19th century	A terrace of three shops and houses in brick with a slate roof in three storeys.	II
8 and 10 Princess Street; 53.3037°N 2.3750°W		Early 19th century	Two shops and houses in brick with a slate roof in three storeys.	II
14 Princess Street; 53.3039°N 2.3752°W	—	Early 19th century	A shop in two storeys, constructed in rendered brick with a slate roof.	II
The Lodge, Toft Road; 53.2980°N 2.3711°W		Early 19th century	A house with an 18th-century core and a later extension. Constructed in brick with a slate roof.	II
Sandfield House, Toft Road; 53.2902°N 2.3655°W	—	Early 19th century	Possibly incorporating fabric from an earlier building, it is a brick house with a slate roof in three storeys.	II
Pump, Chelford Road; 53.2968°N 2.3599°W	—	Early 19th century (probable)	A water pump in cast iron with a lead pipe in a wooden case, with a stone trough.	II
6–13 Gaskell Avenue; 53.3041°N 2.3777°W		c. 1830	A terrace of eight houses in brick with a slate roof.	II
92 King Street; 53.3054°N 2.3741°W	—	c. 1830	A pair of shops, altered in the late 19th century. It has two storeys, and is in brick with a slate roof.	II
34 and 36 King Street; 53.3030°N 2.3717°W		c. 1840	A two-storey pair of shops in painted brick with slate roofs.	II
Bank, Princess Street; 53.3035°N 2.3745°W		c. 1840	Designed by R. Gregson, this is a single-storey bank in ashlar stone with a slate roof.	II
School House Cottage, Toft Road; 53.2887°N 2.3651°W		1841	A two-storey house constructed in painted brick with overhanging slate roofs. Over the porch is a stone carved in low relief with a coat of arms.	II
Lamp post 53.30775°N 2.37512°W		1844	The lamp post near the Knutsford Entrance to Tatton Park is in cast iron on a stone base, and was originally also a finger post. It has a cylindrical plinth, a splayed foot and two fluted columns, one above the other, and at the top of each is an Egyptian capital. It is surmounted by a vase and a 20th-century lantern. The finger posts have been removed.	II
Governor's House, Toft Road; 53.3015°N 2.3737°W		1846	Built for the governor of the gaol, designed by Edmund Sharpe in Georgian style. It is constructed in brick with a slate roof, and is in two storeys. Later used as council offices, now for Knutsford Town Council.	II
County Terrace; 53.3017°N 2.3772°W	—	c. 1850	A terrace of eight two-storey houses built for the staff of the gaol. They are in roughcast brick with a slate roof.	II
Bank, 127 King Street; 53.3064°N 2.3739°W		1856	Purpose-built as a bank, it is in two storeys. It is constructed in brick with stone dressings, and has a slate roof. The entrance is surrounded by columns and an entablature.	II
Former Town Hall, Toft Road; 53.3032°N 2.3740°W		1871	Built as a town hall and market hall; designed by Alfred Waterhouse. Constructed in red brisk with blue brick dressings and a tiled roof. It is in two storeys plus an attic, and has a turret with a spire. Later converted into a shop.	II
10 and 12 Minshull Street; 53.3056°N 2.3744°W	—	1877	A pair of two-storey shops in brick with a slate roof.	II
Egerton School, Church Hill; 53.3034°N 2.3736°W		c. 1880	A former Church of England school, later used as offices. It is built in brick with terracotta dressings, and has a slate roof.	II
St Cross Church; 53.3034°N 2.3670°W		1880–81	A new church designed by Paley and Austin. It is built in brick with terracotta dressings in Perpendicular style, and has a tiled roof. Its plan includes a nave, north and south aisles, a four-stage tower at the crossing, and a chancel with north and south chapels. On the south is a two-storey vestry is on the south, with a porch is to the west of the north aisle.	II*
The Old Croft, Legh Road; 53.2948°N 2.3655°W	—	1895	A house designed by John Brooke for Richard Harding Watt. Watt added the tower in 1907 to a design by William Longworth. It has two storeys, the lower storey being in brick, and the upper storey and tower in roughcast brick, with a plain tiled roof.	II
Bexton Croft, Toft Road; 53.2951°N 2.3688°W	—	1896	A house designed by Baillie Scott, his first English commission, and considered to be one of his best early buildings.	II*
Brae Cottage, Legh Road; 53.2962°N 2.3655°W		1898	A house designed by Paul Ogden for Henry Royce. It is a brick building in two storeys, with stone dressings, some timberwork, and stone-slate roofs.	II
4–8 Drury Lane; 53.3068°N 2.3732°W		1898–1904	A row of five painted brick two-storey cottages with a slate roof designed by Richard Harding Watt with Harry S. Fairhurst, incorporating fabric from earlier buildings. The windows in the lower storey are casements; in the upper storey are oriel windows and wooden balconies.	II
Mews House and Drury Cottage; 53.3068°N 2.3728°W		1898–1904	This originated as laundry buildings designed by Richard Harding Watt with Harry S. Fairhurst, later converted into two cottages. Constructed in painted brick with a slate roof, it is in 1½ storeys, with gabled dormers in the upper storey.	II
Tower House, 9 Drury Lane; 53.3068°N 2.3726°W		1898–1904	A five-storey building designed by Richard Harding Watt with Harry S. Fairhurst. It is constructed in painted brick with some projecting blocks of brick, and has a flat roof.The windows are small, square, and deeply set in the walls.	II
10, 11 and 12 Drury Lane; 53.3068°N 2.3723°W		1898–1904	This was originally a dye-works designed by Richard Harding Watt with Harry S. Fairhurst, later converted into three cottages. It is in painted brick and has slate roofs.	II
13 Drury Lane; 53.3068°N 2.3722°W		1898–1904	This is a four-storey tower house with an open top storey that was designed by Richard Harding Watt with Harry S. Fairhurst. It is in painted brick and has a low pyramidal slate roof.	II
Round House, Legh Road; 53.2969°N 2.3656°W		c. 1900	Designed by Richard Harding Watt, this large house consists of a three-storey rectangular block with a round tower on one of the rear corners; at the other corner is a square bay window. The main block has an irregular parapet and a porch with Ionic pilasters.	II
Cemetery Chapel; 53.3119°N 2.3974°W		1901	Designed by Robert J. McBeath, it is constructed in rusticated rubble stone with a tiled roof. Its plan is octagonal with an entrance tower at the east end, and gables at the other cardinal points.	II
Ollerton Grange; 53.2909°N 2.3428°W	—	1901	A country house in Jacobean style designed by John Brooke. Constructed in brick with sandstone dressings and a tiled roof.	II
Ollerton Grange Lodge; 53.2889°N 2.3438°W	—	1901	Designed by John Brooke the lodge is constructed in brick with a tiled roof in Neo-Tudor style. On the front are two Dutch gables.	II
White Howe, Legh Road; 53.2987°N 2.3656°W		1901	This is a two-storey house designed by Walter Aston for Richard Harding Watt in roughcast brick with a pantiled hip roof. It has two towers of differing sizes. The architectural style is Italianate.	II
Breeze, Legh Road; 53.2984°N 2.3655°W		1902	This originated as stables and a gardener's flat for Lake House, later converted into a house. It was designed by Walter Aston for Richard Harding Watt. Constructed in rendered brick with stone dressings and a pantile roof, it is in two storeys and has a three-storey tower surmounted by a cupola.	II
Lake House, Legh Road; 53.2987°N 2.3656°W		1902	A three-storey house designed by Richard Harding Watt, constructed in rendered brick with stone dressings and a pantile roof. At the east end is a round tower with an irregular parapet, and containing an oriel window.	II
Library, Brook Street; 53.3022°N 2.3698°W		1902	A Carnegie library dating from 1902, designed by Alfred Darbyshire. It is a brick building with buff terracotta dressings and a slate roof. It was replaced as a library by a new building on a different site in 2002.	II
Ruskin Rooms, Drury Lane; 53.3067°N 2.3734°W		1902	Designed as reading rooms and a fire station by Richard Harding Watt with Harry S. Fairhurst, and completed by Walter Aston. It is in three storeys with a roof of pantiles, and has a tower surmounted by a green dome.	II
High Morland and Harding House, Legh Road; 53.2981°N 2.3655°W		1903	Designed by William Longworth for Richard Harding Watt in rendered brick with stone dressings and a pantile roof. It has three storeys. Linked to the house by a lower bay is a tower with an over-hanging pyramidal roof.	II
High Morland Lodge, Legh Road; 53.2980°N 2.3652°W		1903	Designed by William Longworth for Richard Harding Watt as a lodge to High Morland, in rendered brick with stone dressings and a pantile roof. At the rear is a tower with a pyramidal roof.	II
Woodgarth, Leycester Road; 53.2929°N 2.3637°W	—	1904	This is a two-storey house with an L-plan designed by Percy Worthington. It is in roughcast brick with stone dressings and has a plain tiled roof. The interior includes Arts and Crafts features.	II
Wall, gate piers and gates, Woodgarth, Leycester Road; 53.2933°N 2.3636°W	—	1904	These are in brick with stone copings.	II
Broad Terraces, Legh Road; 53.2972°N 2.3654°W		1905	Designed by Richard Harding Watt, the house is constructed in rendered brick with a pyramidal pantile roof. It has a square belvedere tower, also with a pyramidal roof. There are Italianate and Classical architectural features, including Doric columns.	II
Wall and gatepiers, Round House, Legh Road; 53.2969°N 2.3650°W		c. 1905	These are in coursed rubble stone with stone copings. One gate pier is round, the other square, reflecting the plan of the house.	II
Gazebo in garden, Round House, Legh Road; 53.2970°N 2.3651°W		c. 1905	Designed by Richard Harding Watt, this is in rendered brick and consists of a small circular structure with the appearance of an "upside-down cabbage with a small cupola", or a "pineapple".	II
Aldwarden Hill, Legh Road; 53.2977°N 2.3654°W	—	1906	A house, now divided into two, designed by Richard Harding Watt. It is constructed in rendered brick with ashlar dressings, random projecting blocks, and a pantile roof. The house is in two storeys surmounted by a belvedere, its design being adapted from that of an Italianate villa. Its gatehouse and screen walls are included in the listing.	II
Chantry Dane, Legh Road; 53.2974°N 2.3654°W		1906	A house designed by Richard Harding Watt, constructed in rendered brick with stone dressings, and pantile roofs. It is in three storeys. Its features include an Ionic porch at the front, a tower, and a bellcote.	II
Folly in garden of Broad Terraces, Legh Road; 53.2970°N 2.3656°W		c. 1906	A cylindrical structure designed by Richard Harding Watt in rendered brick. It is an open structure consisting of pilasters carrying a conical roof surmounted by a lantern.	II
The Lodge, Legh Road; 53.2977°N 2.3651°W		c. 1906	This consists of the former entrance lodge of the Manchester Royal Infirmary, designed in about 1845 by Richard Lane. It was re-erected here by Richard Harding Watt. It is in ashlar stone, and has the appearance of a Greek Doric temple. On its south side is a tower with a balustraded parapet.	II
The Coach House, Legh Road; 53.2979°N 2.3654°W		1907	This was originally the coach house and servants' quarters to Aldwarden Hill. Designed by Richard Harding Watt, it is constructed in rendered brick with a pantile roof. Its features include a tower.	II
King's Coffee House and Gaskell Memorial Tower; 53.3041°N 2.3730°W		1907–08	Designed by William Longworth for Richard Harding Watt as a coffee house and council offices; used later as a restaurant. It consists of a main block for the offices, forming a courtyard, and the tower with an external staircase. It is constructed in rubble sandstone, with Portland stone at the top of the tower. Its architectural style is eclectic Italianate with Arts and Crafts elements. Its features include a smaller tower with a dome, a statue of Mrs Gaskell in a niche, a bronze medallion, and a pair of large Doric columns which were moved from St Peter's Church in Manchester.	II*
46 King Street; 53.3037°N 2.3726°W		1911	Built as a bakery, later converted into a shop. Designed by J. Herbert Hall in Vernacular Revival style. It has a jettied upper storey with an oriel window.	II
War Memorial; 53.30286°N 2.36615°W		c. 1920	The war memorial, which is about 3 metres (9.8 ft) high, is in sandstone and consists of a fleur-de-lis cross on an octagonal shaft. This stands on a square tapering plinth on three steps. On the front face of the plinth is an inscription, and the names of those lost are inscribed on the sides.	II
Pair of telephone kiosks, King Street; 53.3062°N 2.3740°W	—	1935	Two type K6 telephone kiosks designed by Giles Gilbert Scott.	II
24 and 26 Princess Street; 53.3042°N 2.3754°W		Undated	A pair of three-storey shops in brick with a slate roof.	II
Centennial War Memorial; 53.301908°N 2.3738474°W		1919/2018	War memorial, topped with a private funerary monument in the form of a bronze statue of 1919 depicting the deceased (Haron Baronian) in field dress, by the sculptor Hamo Thorneycroft, and which was relocated in the 1930s and 1977 and installed on its present war memorial plinth in 2018.	II

== See also ==
- Listed buildings in Bexton
- Listed buildings in Marthall
- Listed buildings in Mere
- Listed buildings in Mobberley
- Listed buildings in Ollerton
- Listed buildings in Tabley Superior
- Listed buildings in Tatton
- Listed buildings in Toft
