= River lily =

River lily may refer to:

- Crinum pedunculatum, native to Australia, New Zealand, and some Pacific Islands
- Hesperantha coccinea, native to South Africa and Zimbabwe
- River Lily, a river in England
