= Selina Davenport =

English novelist

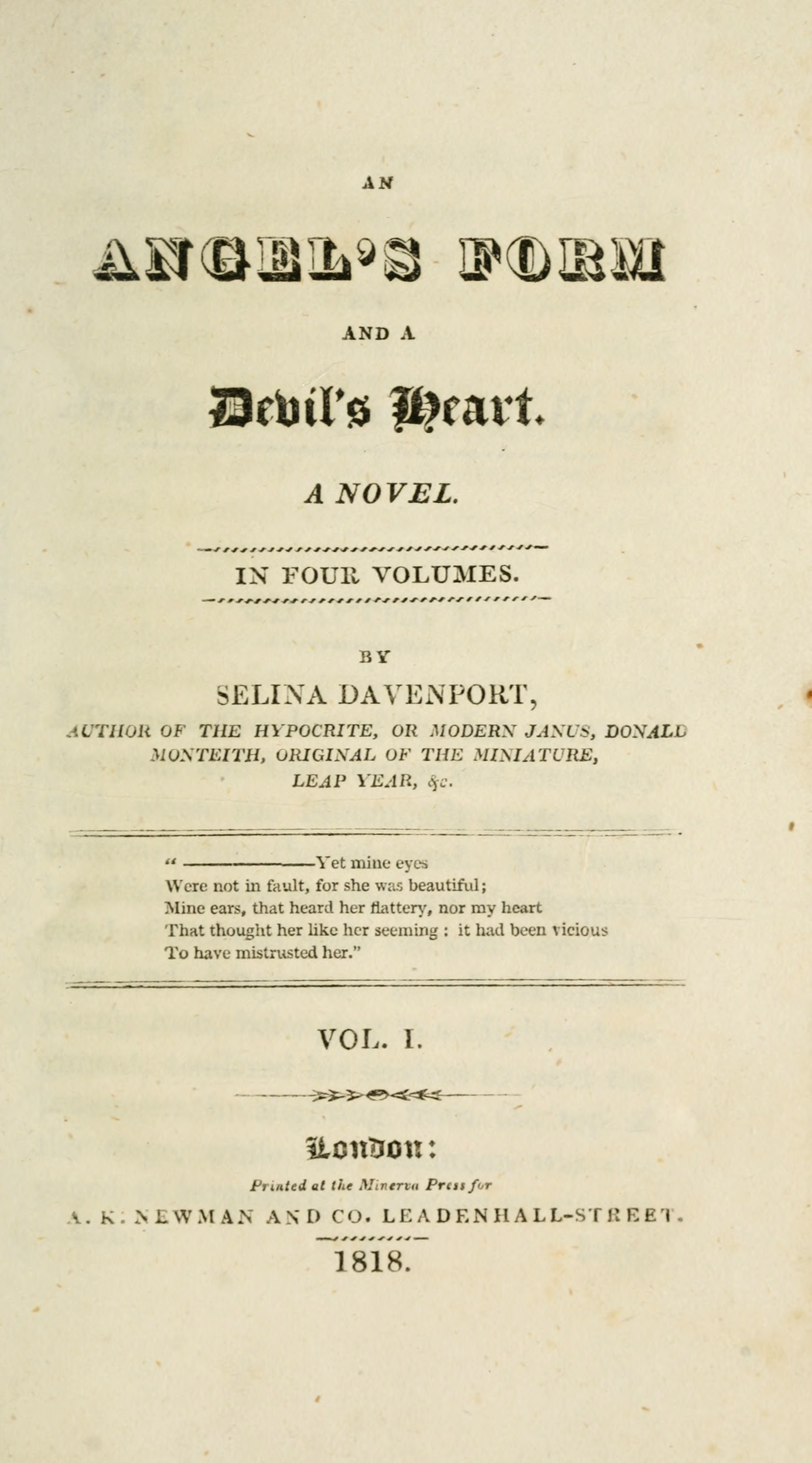
- Title page of Selina Davenport's An Angel's Form and a Devil's Heart: a Novel (London: Minerva Press, 1818)
- Born: Selina Granville Wheler; 27 June 1779; London, Kingdom of Great Britain
- Died: 14 July 1859 (aged 80)
- Occupation: Author
- Spouse: Richard Alfred Davenport
- Children: Mary Davenport (born 1803); Theodora Davenport (born (1806)
- Relatives: Charles Granville Wheler (father)
- Writing career
- Genre: Gothic novels

Selina Davenport (27 June 1779 – 14 July 1859) was an English novelist, briefly married to the miscellanist and biographer Richard Alfred Davenport. Her eleven published novels have been recently described as "effective if stereotyped".

== Early life ==
Selina Granville Wheler was born in London, England, on 27 July 1779, to Captain Charles Granville Wheler and his wife. At an early age, Selina met and later befriended sisters Anna Maria Porter and Jane Porter, who were both to become successful writers in the early 1800s. Of the two sisters, Selina was closer to Jane, and the two women remained friends until Porter died in 1850.

== Marriage and separation ==
On 6 September 1800, at the age of 21, Selina Wheler married Richard Alfred Davenport (1777–1852), a writer. They had two daughters – Mary, born in 1803 in Chelsea, and Theodora, born in 1806 in Putney – but they separated acrimoniously in or around 1810, for what Selina called "sufficient reasons". However, they never divorced and neither of them remarried.

After the separation, Davenport claimed she had been left with next to nothing, while her husband stated that she had left debts of £150 incurred while running a school. She began writing as a means of support for both herself and her two daughters.

== Writing ==
Selina Davenport wrote eleven novels altogether. Most were published by the popular Minerva Press (later A. K. Newman & Company), known especially for sentimental and Gothic fiction. At least two were translated into German.

Sons of the Viscount, and the Daughters of the Earl (1813) has a typical plot of family enmity and seduction and involves two sisters who fall in love with two brothers. One pair achieves marital bliss; the other are divided by "giddiness" and eventual death. Italian Vengeance and English Forbearance (1828) features an avenging woman who shoots her seducer dead in a duel. One literary critic has commented that Italian Vengeance "use[s] Gothic tropes to sensationalize a domestic novel of manners."

== Later life ==
In addition to writing novels, Davenport supported her family financially with various business ventures that included running a coffee house and a dance school. She also received financial help from Jane Porter and additional support, in the form of a letter to the Royal Literary Fund supporting a request for financial aid, from Elizabeth Gaskell. Her husband, on the other hand, sought to prevent her from receiving payments from the fund.

Davenport abandoned writing in 1834 and thereafter supported her widowed daughters by running a tiny shop in Knutsford, Cheshire, the town on which Gaskell based her famous novel Cranford.

Selina Davenport died on 14 July 1859, aged 80. She was buried at St John the Baptist's Church, Knutsford.

== Bibliography ==
- The Sons of the Viscount. And the Daughters of the Earl: a Novel; Depicting Recent Scenes in Fashionable Life (London: Henry Colburn, 1813)
- The Hypocrite: or, The Modern Janus; a Novel (London: Minerva Press, 1814)
- Donald Monteith, the Handsomest Man of the Age: a Novel (London: Minerva Press, 1815)
- The Original of the Miniature: a Novel (London: Minerva Press, 1816)
- Leap Year: or, Woman's Privilege; a Novel (London: Minerva Press, 1817)
- An Angel's Form and a Devil's Heart: a Novel (London: Minerva Press, 1818)
- "The Heiress of Glenalvon. A Tale", The Pocket Magazine of Classic and Polite Literature, Volume 1, p. 11 ff. (1818)
- Preference: a Novel (London: A. K. Newman and Co., 1824)
- Italian Vengeance and English Forbearance: a Romance (London: A. K. Newman and Co., 1828)
- The Queen's Page: a Romance (London: A. K. Newman and Co., 1831)
- The Unchanged: a Novel (London: A. K. Newman and Co., 1832)
- Personation: a Novel (London: A. K. Newman and Co., 1834)

== Etexts ==
- The Sons of the Viscount. And the Daughters of the Earl (1813): Full text at HathiTrust
- The Hypocrite: or, The Modern Janus (1814): Full text at HathiTrust and Internet Archive
- Donald Monteith, the Handsomest Man of the Age (1815): Full text at HathiTrust
- An Angel's Form and a Devil's Heart (1818): Full text at HathiTrust
- Preference (1824): Full text at Google Books: Vol. I, II
- The Queen's Page: a Romance (1831): Full text at Google Books: Vol. I, II, III
- The Unchanged (1832): Full text at Google Books: Vol. I, II, III
- Personation (1834): Full text at Google Books: Vol. I, II, III

== See also ==
- List of Minerva Press authors
- Minerva Press
