= Knutsford =

Town in Cheshire, England

Coordinates: 53°18′09″N 02°22′15″W

- Town
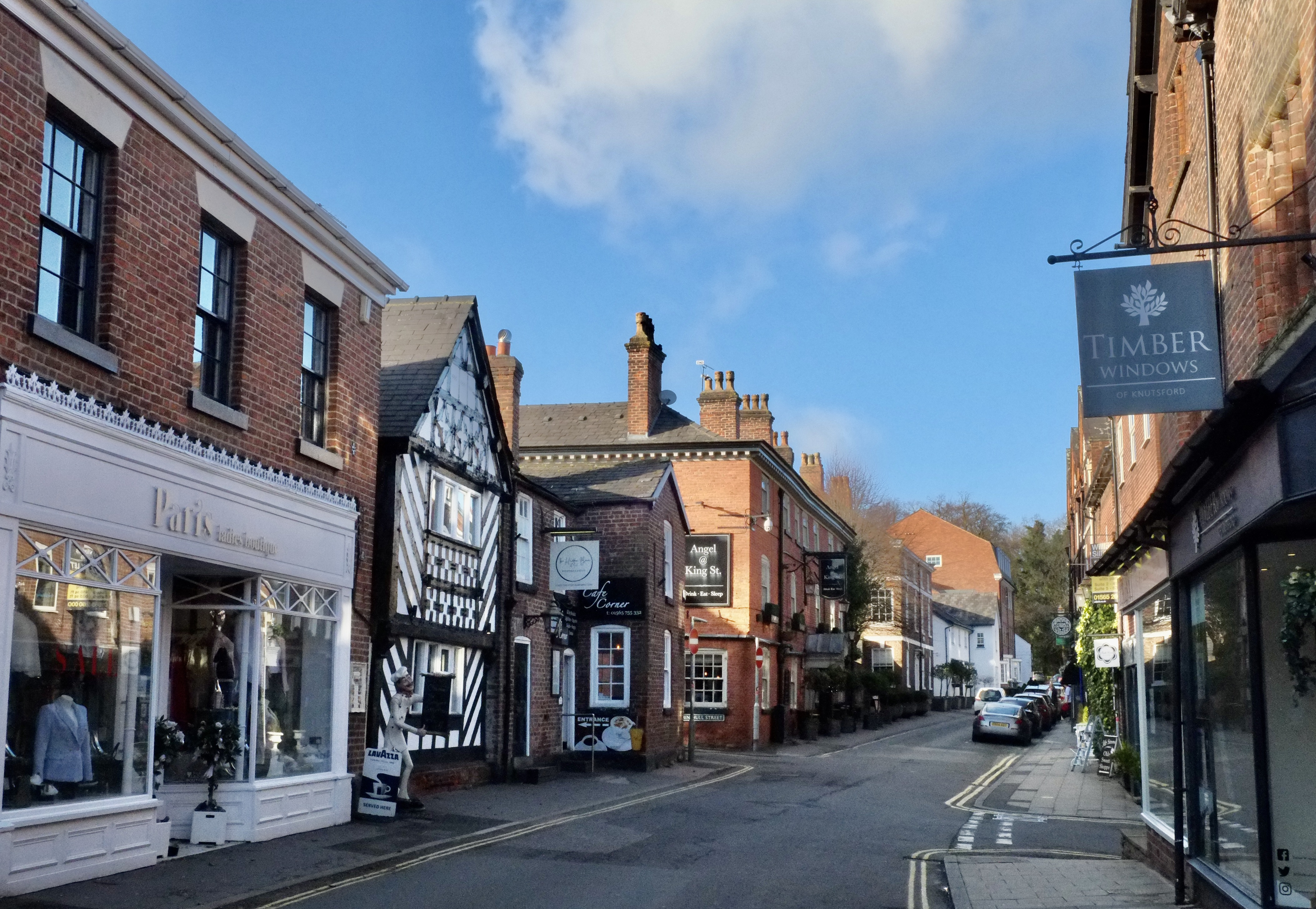
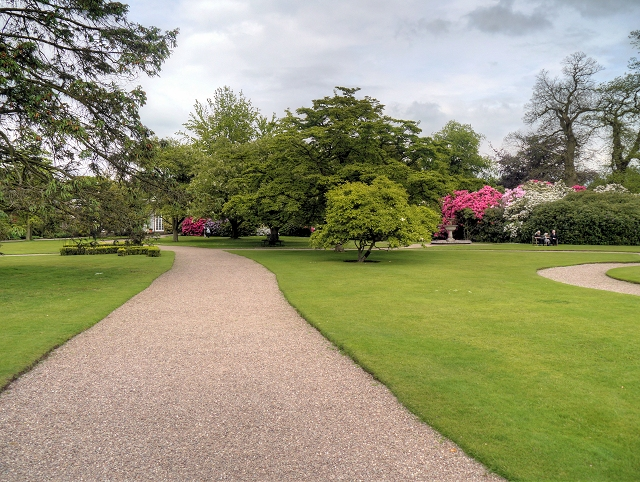
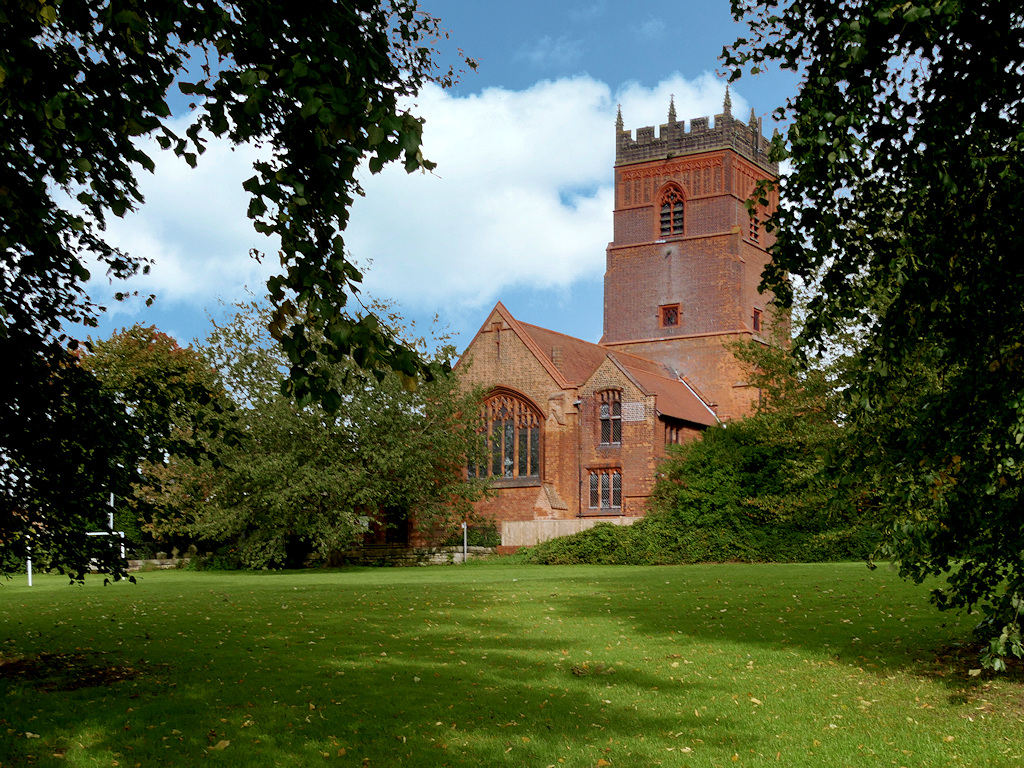
- Kings Street Tatton Park St Cross Church

- Location within Cheshire
- Population: 13,259 (Parish, 2021)
- OS grid reference: SJ753782
- Unitary authority: Cheshire East
- Ceremonial county: Cheshire
- Region: North West
- Country: England
- Sovereign state: United Kingdom
- Post town: KNUTSFORD
- Postcode district: WA16
- Dialling code: 01565
- Police: Cheshire
- Fire: Cheshire
- Ambulance: North West
- UK Parliament: Tatton
- Website: www.knutsford towncouncil.gov.uk/

Knutsford (/ˈnʌtsfərd/) is a market town and civil parish in the Cheshire East district, in Cheshire, England; it is located 14 miles (23 km) south-west of Manchester, 9 miles (14 km) north-west of Macclesfield and 12 1/2 miles (20 km) south-east of Warrington. The population of the parish at the 2021 census was 13,259.

Knutsford's main town centre streets, Princess Street (also known locally as Top Street) and King Street lower down (also known as Bottom Street), form the hub of the town. At one end of the narrow King Street is an entrance to Tatton Park. The Tatton estate was home to the Egerton family and has given its name to Tatton parliamentary constituency, which includes the neighbouring communities of Alderley Edge and Wilmslow.

Knutsford is near Cheshire's Golden Triangle and is on the Cheshire Plain, between the Peak District to the east and the Welsh mountains to the west.

== History ==
Knutsford was recorded in the Domesday Book of 1086 as Cunetesford ("Canute's ford"). King Canute (Knútr in Old Norse) was the king of England (1016–1035) and later king of Denmark, Norway and parts of Sweden as well. Local tradition says that King Canute blessed a wedding that was taking place and forded the River Lily, which was said to be dangerous then, though other reports say it was the Birkin Brook at or near Booth Mill. The English Place-Name Society gives the name as being derived from the Old English for Knutr's ford or possibly hillock ford.

In 1292, Edward I granted Knutsford a market charter, allowing the town to hold a weekly market and annual fairs.

Knutsford was historically part of the ancient parish of Rostherne. A chapel of ease to serve Knutsford was built in the 14th century on a site to the east of the town near Booths Mere. The chapel was initially dedicated to St Helena and later to St John. In 1741, Knutsford was made a separate parish from Rostherne. St John the Baptist's Church was built between 1741 and 1744, on a site in the centre of the town to serve as the new parish church; the old chapel to the east of the town was demolished.

Knutsford gaol was built in 1817 and later extended in 1853. It was not just built to house those committed of crimes but also to house those who could not be employed. In 1915, due to the low population and there being an ongoing World War, the gaol was used as a military prison for the detention of soldiers found guilty of committing offences. From 1916, it was used to house conscientious objectors who broke the Military Service Act 1916. In April 1916, there was an Easter Rising in Ireland, where rebels hoped to form an independent Ireland free from British rule. At least 600 rebels involved in that rising were transported to Knutsford by train from Holyhead and imprisoned in Knutsford Gaol. During this period, many prisoners were not properly fed and resorted to eating grass and anything discarded by visitors. The gaol was demolished in 1934.

Knutsford was the place in which General George S. Patton, shortly before the Normandy invasion, delivered a speech perceived to be critical of the Soviets, and to have "slap(ped) the face of every one of the United Nations except Great Britain", which nearly ended his career.

After the Second World War, overspill housing estates were created in the town to accommodate families from Manchester. The Longridge overspill estate was built in Over Ward by Manchester City Council in the 1960s. At the end of the 20th century, all of the homes on the estate that had not already been sold to their occupants were transferred to Manchester Methodist Housing.

In 2005, Knutsford was named as the most expensive town to buy a house in Northern England, followed by nearby town Altrincham. There is an extremely large range of house prices in Knutsford, varying from approximately £175,000 to nearly £4,000,000 in late 2017. The average price is above £400,000.

== Governance ==
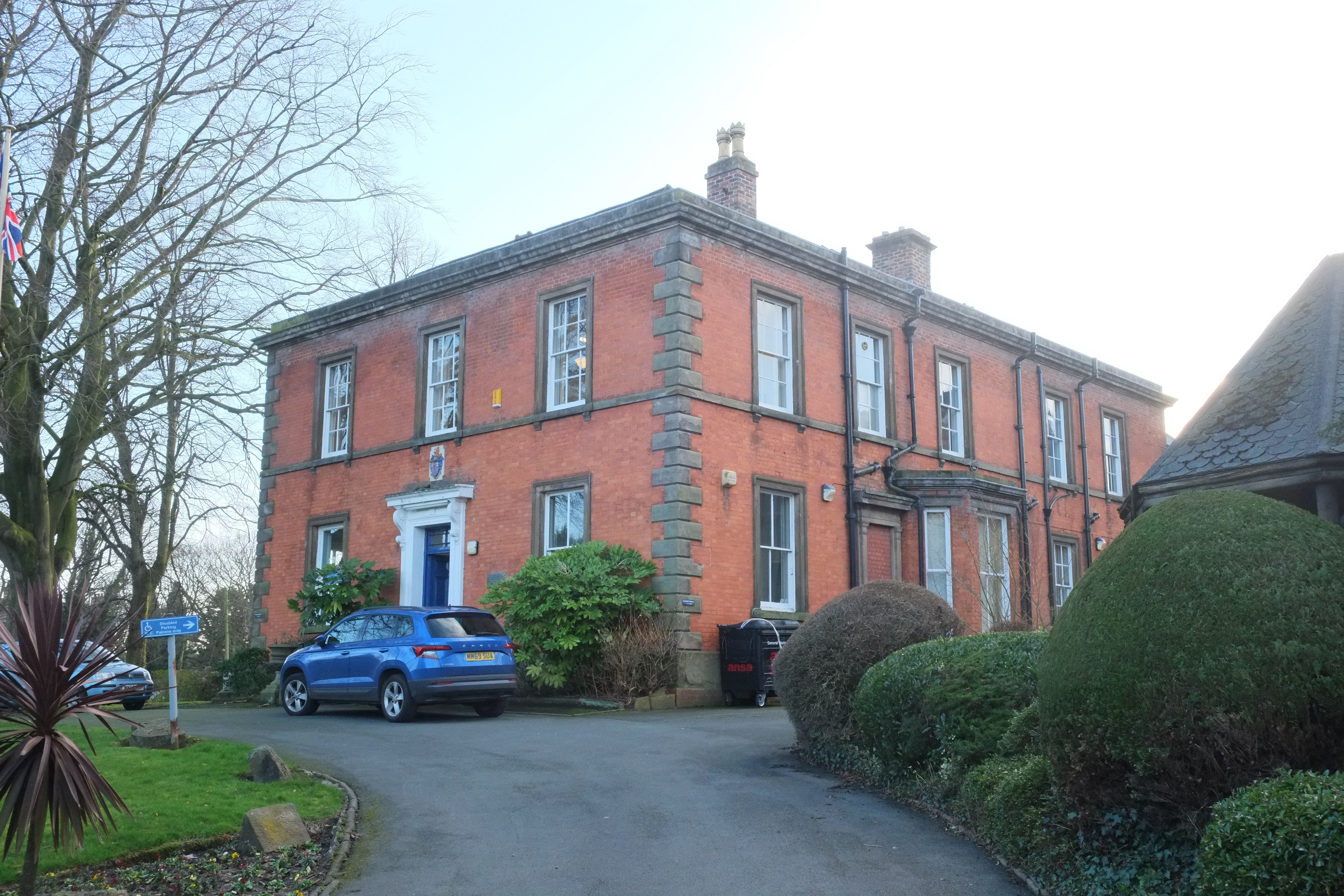
Town Council Offices, Toft Road, built 1846 as Governor's House of Knutsford Gaol

There are two tiers of local government covering Knutsford, at civil parish (town) and unitary authority level: Knutsford Town Council and Cheshire East Council. The town council is based at the Council Offices on Toft Road, which had been built in 1846 as the Governor's House for Knutsford Gaol.

For national elections, the town forms part of the Tatton constituency, named after Tatton Park which lies immediately north of the town.

=== Administrative history ===
Knutsford was historically in the ancient parish of Rostherne, which formed part of the Bucklow Hundred of Cheshire. Rostherne parish was subdivided into several townships, including Nether Knutsford (or Knutsford Inferior) and Over Knutsford (or Knutsford Superior). The main part of the town was in Nether Knutsford township, with Over Knutsford lying to the south-east. In 1741, Knutsford was made a separate parish, which contained the five townships of Nether Knutsford, Over Knutsford, Bexton, Ollerton, and Toft.

From the 17th century onwards, parishes were gradually given various civil functions under the poor laws, in addition to their original ecclesiastical functions. In some cases, including Rostherne and Knutsford, the civil functions were exercised by each township separately rather than the parish as a whole. In 1866, the legal definition of 'parish' was changed to be the areas used for administering the poor laws and so the townships also became civil parishes.

When elected parish and district councils were established in December 1894, under the Local Government Act 1894, Nether Knutsford and Over Knutsford were both briefly included in the Altrincham Rural District and given separate parish councils. The two townships were subsequently merged into a single civil parish and urban district of Knutsford, which came into effect on 1 April 1895. The urban district council bought the former Governor's House of Knutsford Gaol in 1929 and converted the building to serve as its offices and meeting place.

Knutsford Urban District was abolished in 1974 under the Local Government Act 1972. District-level functions passed to Macclesfield Borough Council. A successor parish covering the area of the former Knutsford Urban District was created at the same time, with its parish council taking the name Knutsford Town Council. In 2009, Cheshire East Council was created, taking over the functions of the borough council and Cheshire County Council, which were both abolished.

== Transport ==
=== Roads ===
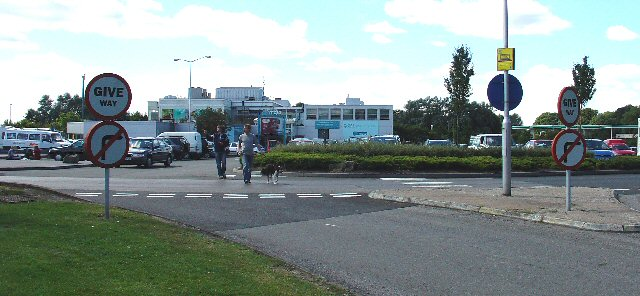
Knutsford motorway service station

Knutsford has excellent access to the motorway network, with junctions to the M6 (J19) and M56 (J7) motorways nearby. However, this can also have disadvantages as the A50, which runs through Knutsford town centre, follows a similar route to the M6 between Warrington and Stoke-on-Trent; this means that if the M6 is closed, due to an accident or roadworks, then a large volume of traffic transfers to the A50 and causes major traffic jams in Knutsford.

=== Railway ===
Knutsford railway station is a stop on the Mid-Cheshire Line that runs between Chester and Manchester Piccadilly, via Altrincham and Stockport.

The station was built in 1862 by the Cheshire Midland Railway (CMR). The CMR was absorbed into the Cheshire Lines Committee (CLC) in August 1867; this entity continued to serve Knutsford until nationalisation on 1 January 1948. The rail service to Manchester was re-routed via a slower route when the Manchester Metrolink trams took over the CLC direct line between Altrincham and Manchester; the heavy rail service was re-routed, via Stockport, to Manchester.

Currently, Northern Trains generally runs an hourly service in both directions. Trains operate to Northwich and Chester to the south-west; northbound services travel to Altrincham, Stockport and Manchester. There are extra trains to and from Stockport at peak times on weekdays. On Sundays, there is a service every two hours in each direction.

The number of weekday peak trains to Manchester was cut back controversially in December 2008, to allow Virgin Trains West Coast to run extra services between Manchester and London. Knutsford was expected to get a half-hourly train services to Northwich and Manchester (Monday to Saturday) by December 2017, with an increase in the Sunday frequency to hourly, but the promised additional services have failed to materialise.

=== Buses ===
D&G Bus operates three bus routes in the town, which can be accessed from Knutsford bus station.

=== Airport ===
Manchester Airport is located 5 miles (8 km) from Knutsford in the civil parish of Ringway; however, there are no direct bus or railway links to it from the town.

== Economy ==
Knutsford town centre has several restaurants and pubs, coffee shops, boutiques, antique shops and art galleries. It has several supermarkets, including Booths, Aldi, Little Waitrose, Sainsbury's Local, Olive & Sage and two Co-op stores.

Tesco used to have a small shop in the town centre, which closed many years ago. The retailer had hoped to open a larger store on the edge of the town on Mobberley Road, but councillors in Mobberley objected to the proposed development, thinking it might result in more cars travelling through their village.

In 2008, Aldi announced plans to open a superstore in Knutsford, but construction did not begin until September 2012. The store officially opened in July 2013.

Barclays has a large campus site at Radbroke Hall on Toft Road just outside Knutsford, employing approximately 3,000 staff in IT and support functions. Before Barclays purchased the site, it was owned by The Nuclear Power Group.

== Religion ==
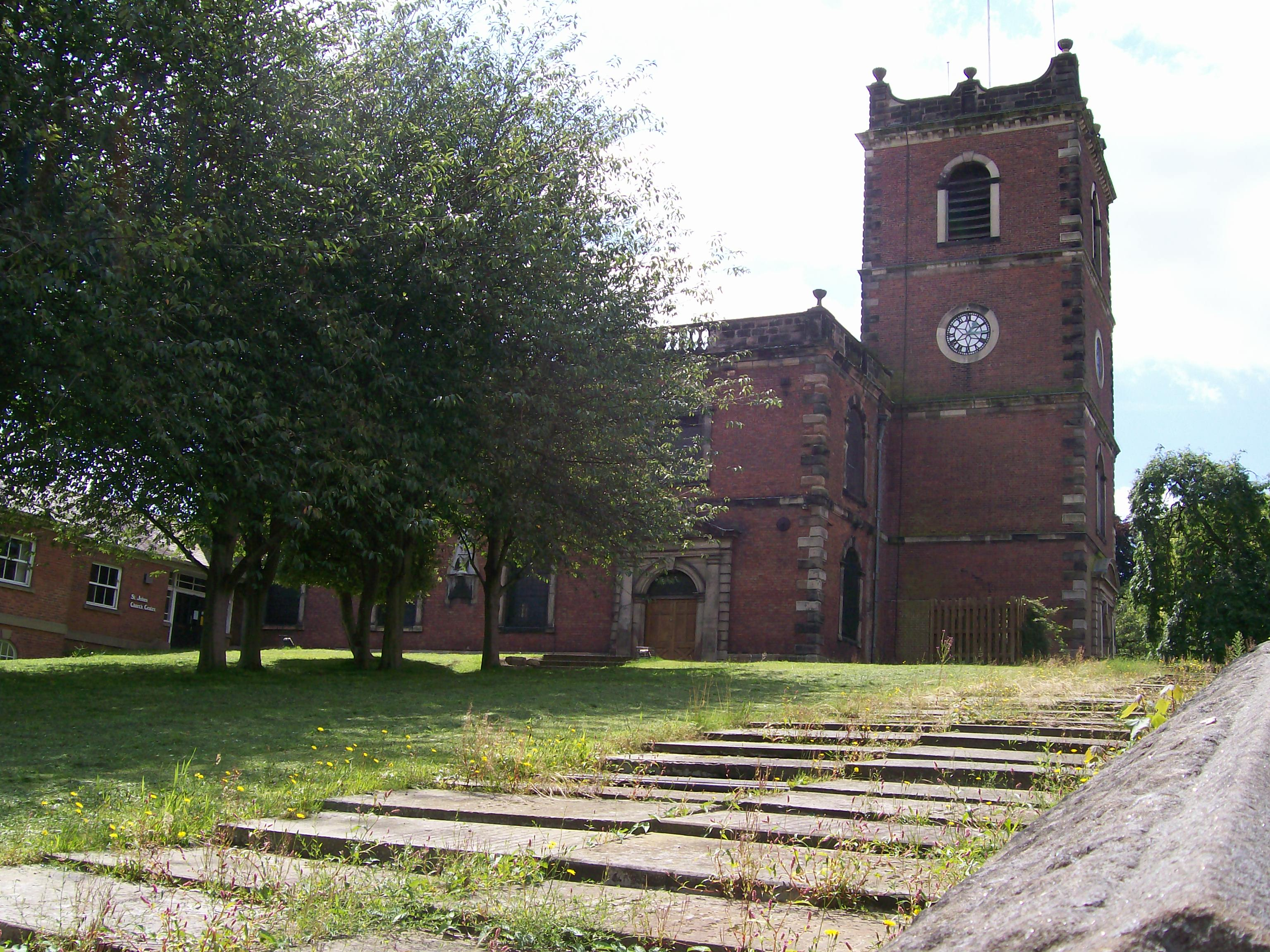
St John the Baptist's Church

St John the Baptist church is recorded in the National Heritage List for England as a designated Grade II* listed building. It is an active Anglican parish church in the located in the Church of England's Diocese of Chester built between 1741 and 1744. It is in the Conservative Evangelical tradition of the Church of England and it has passed resolutions to reject the ordination of women.

St Cross is an Anglican church recorded in the National Heritage List for England as a designated Grade II* listed building, built between 1880 and 1887. Unlike St John's, the church has had two female vicars since the Church of England approved the ordination of women.

St Vincent de Paul is a Catholic church in the Diocese of Shrewsbury. The current church opened in 1983, replacing an older church on the same site dating from the 1920s that was demolished due to subsidence. The first St Vincent de Paul church is still standing and has since been converted in to The Little Theatre. The current church includes a plaque blessed by Pope John Paul II on his visit to Manchester in 1982. The church was modified in 1999 to include an apse with a stained glass window, which had previously been installed at Cross and Passion Sisters convent chapel in Maryfield, Dublin. The church claims the window was designed by Harry Clarke, although other sources state the window is too modern to have been designed by Clarke himself but it can still be attributed to the Harry Clarke Studio.

There is a Methodist church; a Unitarian church dating from 1689, where the novelist Elizabeth Gaskell is buried; and a Gospel church, located in the old ticket office at Knutsford station.

=== Ordination Test School ===
In 1919, Toc H founder Tubby Clayton opened a school (originally in the abandoned Knutsford Gaol) to begin the training of men leaving the armed forces, so that they might eventually train for ordination. This first Knutsford Ordination Test School, for service-men and funded by central church funds, was closed in 1922 and a new, private successor for civilians opened in a house in Knutsford called "Kilrie" in the same year. The school moved to the Old Rectory in Hawarden, Wales, where it was opened by A. G. Edwards, Bishop of St Asaph and Archbishop of Wales, and Cosmo Lang, Archbishop of York, on 26 January 1927. By Michaelmas 1939, when the Old Rectory was required for housing refugees, the school relocated one last time to Hawarden Castle before closing finally the next year.

There were other Ordination Test Schools, including the predecessor of the House of the Epiphany, Kuching.

== Education ==
Knutsford has four primary schools (one of these is a Roman Catholic school); it also has a high school, Knutsford Academy, which also has a sixth form. Some secondary school pupils from the town travel to schools in Altrincham, Hartford, Holmes Chapel, Hale and Macclesfield. Some sixth formers from the town travel to colleges in Northwich and Timperley. Macclesfield College run some adult education courses in Knutsford and Age UK run computer courses for the over 50s at Knutsford Library.

== Sport ==
Knutsford Cricket Club was established in 1881 and plays its home games on Mereheath Lane in the Cheshire Cricket Alliance.

Toft Cricket Club is located at Booths Park, Chelford Road. The Cricket Club gets its name from a neighbouring civil parish of Toft, where the original ground was located when the club was established in 1928. Toft play in the ECB Premier Division of the Cheshire County Cricket League It won the National Village Championship trophy at Lords in 1989.

Knutsford Hockey Club plays its home games at Knutsford Leisure Centre and are based at the Crosstown Bowling Club on Chelford Road. This 100-year-old club runs 3 men's teams, a ladies team, a mixed team and a badgers team. The Men's 1st XI play in Division 1 of The North West Hockey League

Knutsford Football Club, formed in 1948, play at their Manchester Road ground. The club has two Saturday teams, the first team in the Cheshire League and the second or A team in the Altrincham and District League. Two Associated Veterans teams also play on Sundays in the Cheshire Veterans League. In 2015, a youth team has been fielded again after a break of 127 years.

Every ten years, Knutsford hosts an international three-hour endurance race for Penny-farthing bicycles.

== Media ==
Regional local news and television programmes are provided by BBC North West and ITV Granada. Television signals are received from the Winter Hill TV transmitter.

Local radio stations are BBC Radio Manchester, Greatest Hits Radio Manchester & The North West, Capital North West & Wales, Heart North West and Cheshire's Silk Radio.

The Knutsford Guardian and Knutsford Times are the local newspapers in the town.

== Culture and community ==
A resident of the town sanding the street in celebration of May Day 1920. The custom continues to this day

There are many events in and around the town each year including the May Day festivities, the RHS Flower Show at Tatton Park and the Cheshire County Show in the parish of Tabley.

The annual Knutsford Royal May Day festival is where hundreds of people along with farm animals, morris dancers and folkloric characters such as Jack in the Green parade through the town's streets and the May Queen is crowned. During the May Day weekend, there is also a funfair run on ‘'The Heath'’, a large field near the centre of Knutsford where the crowning of the May Queen also takes place. This is said to be one of the largest travelling funfairs in the UK, with a large selection of rides and games to enjoy.

Local folklore claims that Edward "Highwayman" Higgins had a tunnel running under The Heath, where he hid his booty.

There is a May Day custom, still observed today, of "sanding the streets" in Knutsford. The streets are decorated with coloured sands in patterns and pictures. Tradition has it that King Cnut, while fording the River Lily, threw sand from his shoes into the path of a wedding party, wishing the newly wed as many children as the grains of sand at their feet. The custom can be traced to the late 1600s. Queen Victoria, in her journal of 1832 recorded: "we arrived at Knutsford, where we were most civilly received, the streets being sanded in shapes which is peculiar to this town."

Knutsford was the model for Elizabeth Gaskell's novel Cranford. She lived in the town for some time, on what is now known as Gaskell Avenue, and she is buried in the Unitarian Chapel graveyard. Many of the places and people described in her books can be identified as being based on places and people in the town. In 2007, the BBC adapted the novel and produced a popular TV series Cranford. Despite several references to Knutsford, including King Street and The Heath, the TV adaptation was actually filmed in Lacock, Wiltshire. Notably, in 1987 Legh Road in Knutsford, designed by Richard Harding Watt, doubled for Colonial Shanghai in the opening scenes from Steven Spielberg's film Empire of the Sun. A Gaskell protégé who died in Knutsford in 1859 was the once-popular novelist Selina Davenport, who abandoned writing despairingly in 1834 and kept a tiny Knutsford shop instead.

Knutsford Amateur Drama Society was established in 1925 and moved to its premises in Queen Street, Knutsford shortly after the end of the Second World War. Now known by the name of the building it occupies, Knutsford Little Theatre continues to produce a selection of plays each year, including an annual pantomime.

Knutsford Heritage Centre is situated in a 17th-century timber-framed building just off King Street, which was a blacksmith's forge in the 19th century. It has a museum, garden, shop and gallery featuring various exhibitions, talks and events, and walking tours are also available. On permanent exhibition are the May Queen's dress shoes and crown from 1887.

Scenes from the George C. Scott film Patton were filmed in the centre of Knutsford, in front of Knutsford Town Hall. The building was designed by Alfred Waterhouse, and for much of the 20th century was home to Knutsford Boys' Club and latterly a furniture show room and post office. It is now home to the Lost & Found pub and cocktail bar.

The third chapter of Alan Sharp's novel A Green Tree in Gedde (1965) is set in Knutsford.

== Notable people ==
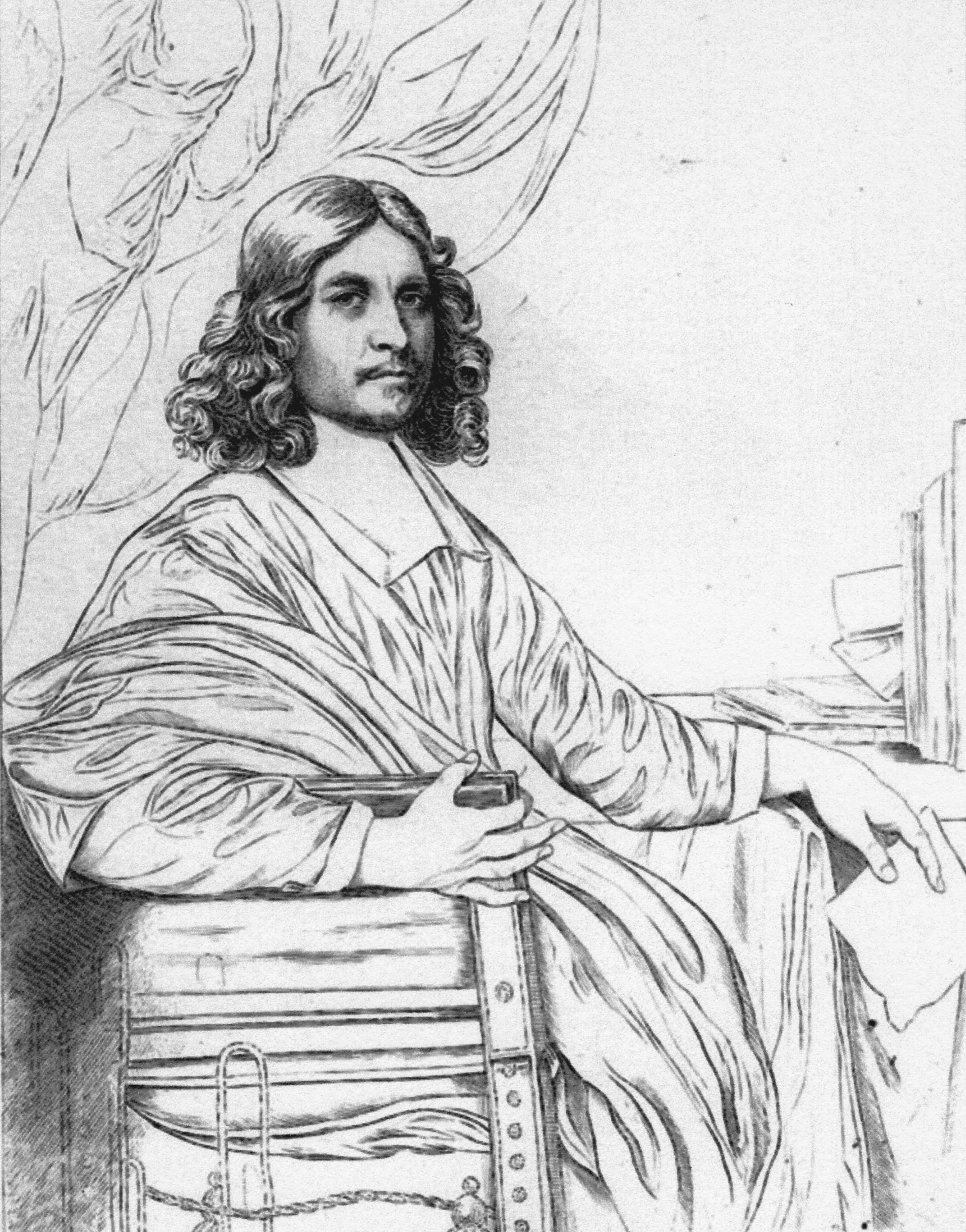
Peter Leycester, 1665

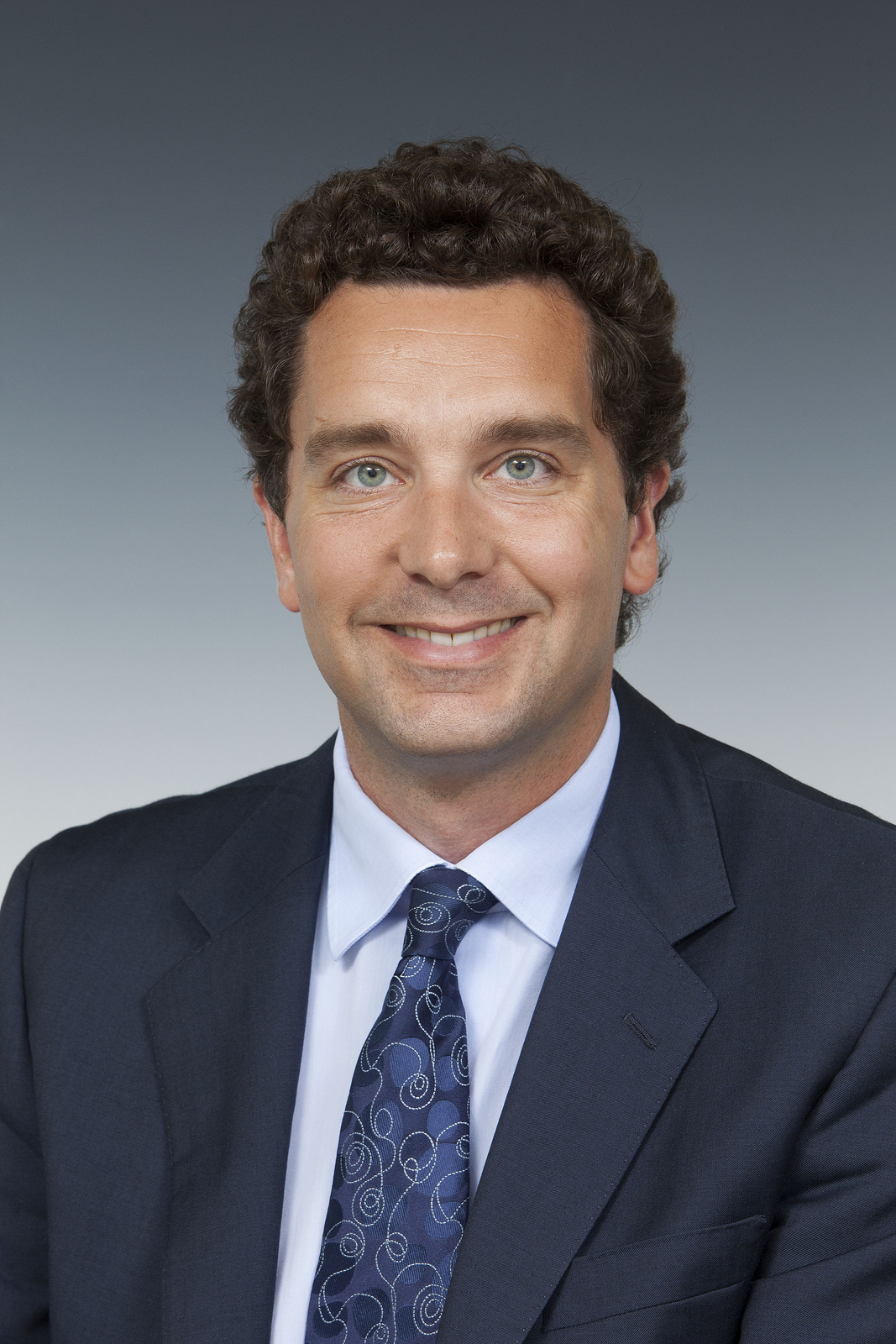
Edward Timpson, 2014

- Sir Peter Leycester, 1st Baronet (1614 in Nether Tabley – 1678), an antiquarian and historian
- James Neild (1744 in Knutsford – 1814), a jeweller, prison reformer and philanthropist.
- Edmund Sharpe (1809 in Knutsford – 1877), architect, architectural historian, railway engineer and sanitary reformer.
- Sir Henry Royce, 1st Baronet (1863–1933), an engineer, car designer and joint founder of the Rolls-Royce company. Lived in Knutsford 1898–1912
- Brig. General Sir Ernest Makins (1869–1959), a military officer, statesman and Conservative MP for Knutsford 1922–1945
- Boyd Merriman, 1st Baron Merriman (1880 in Knutsford – 1962), a Conservative politician and judge
- Sir Edward Peel (1884 in Knutsford – 1961), an army officer, businessman, amateur sportsman and big-game fisherman; lived mainly in Egypt.
- Lt. Colonel Sir Walter Henry Bromley-Davenport (1903–1989), Conservative MP for Knutsford 1945–1970
- John Bason (born 1957 in Knutsford), businessman, on the Board of Trustees of Voluntary Service Overseas
- James Timpson, Baron Timpson (born 1971), businessman and politician, former CEO of the Timpson Group
- Edward Timpson (born 1973 in Knutsford), Conservative politician. MP for Crewe and Nantwich 2008–2017 and for Eddisbury from 2019 to 2024
- Matthew Falder (born 1988), a convicted paedophile and blackmailer, lived in Knutsford

=== Arts ===
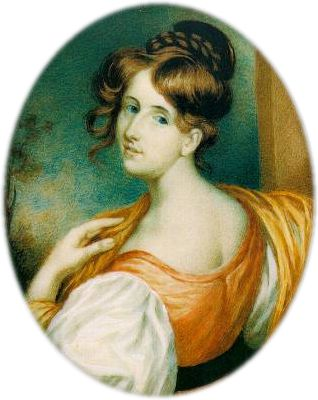
Elizabeth Gaskell, 1832

- Edward Penny (1714 in Knutsford – 1791), portrait and historical painter, a founder members of the Royal Academy.
- John Leicester, 1st Baron de Tabley (1762 in Tabley House – 1827), landowner, politician, amateur artist and patron of the arts.
- Selina Davenport (1779–1859), novelist until 1834 when she ran a tiny shop in Knutsford
- Sir Henry Holland, 1st Baronet (1788 in Knutsford – 1873), physician and travel writer.
- Elizabeth Gaskell (1810–1865), novelist, biographer and short story writer, grew up in Knutsford.
- Evelyn Gleeson (1855 in Knutsford – 1944), embroidery, carpet and tapestry designer
- Barrie Cooke (1931 in Knutsford – 2014), an Irish abstract expressionist painter
- Martin Edwards (born 1955 in Knutsford), a crime novelist, critic and solicitor
- Robert Heaton (1961 in Knutsford – 2004), musician, drummer in the rock band New Model Army
- Tom Walker (born 1991), Brit Award-winning singer-songwriter, grew up in Knutsford
- Ruby Barnhill (born 2004 in Knutsford), child actress, played the lead role in Steven Spielberg's 2016 film The BFG

=== Sport ===
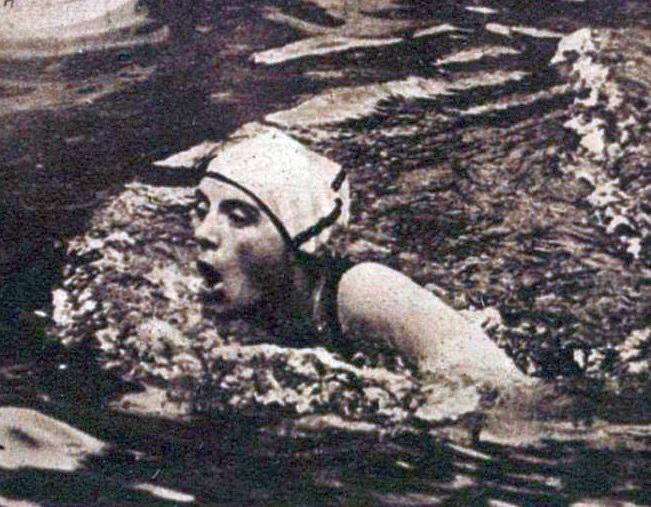
Lucy Morton, 1924

- John Payne (1828 in Knutsford - 1887), a cricketer who played for the North of England cricket team and Manchester
- Tom Barber (1894 in Knutsford – 1936), a pro. golfer, twice finished in the top 10 in The Open Championship.
- Lucy Morton (1898 at New Tatton – 1980), swimmer, gold medallist in the 200-metre breaststroke at the 1924 Summer Olympics
- Emma Davies (born 1978 in Knutsford), cyclist, competed in the 2000 and 2004 Summer Olympics
- Aaron Wilbraham (born 1979 in Knutsford), footballer and manager, played 608 games; he last played for Rochdale A.F.C.

== See also ==
- Listed buildings in Knutsford
