= St John the Baptist's Church, Knutsford =

Coordinates: 53.3034°N 2.3735°W

St John the Baptist Church, Knutsford
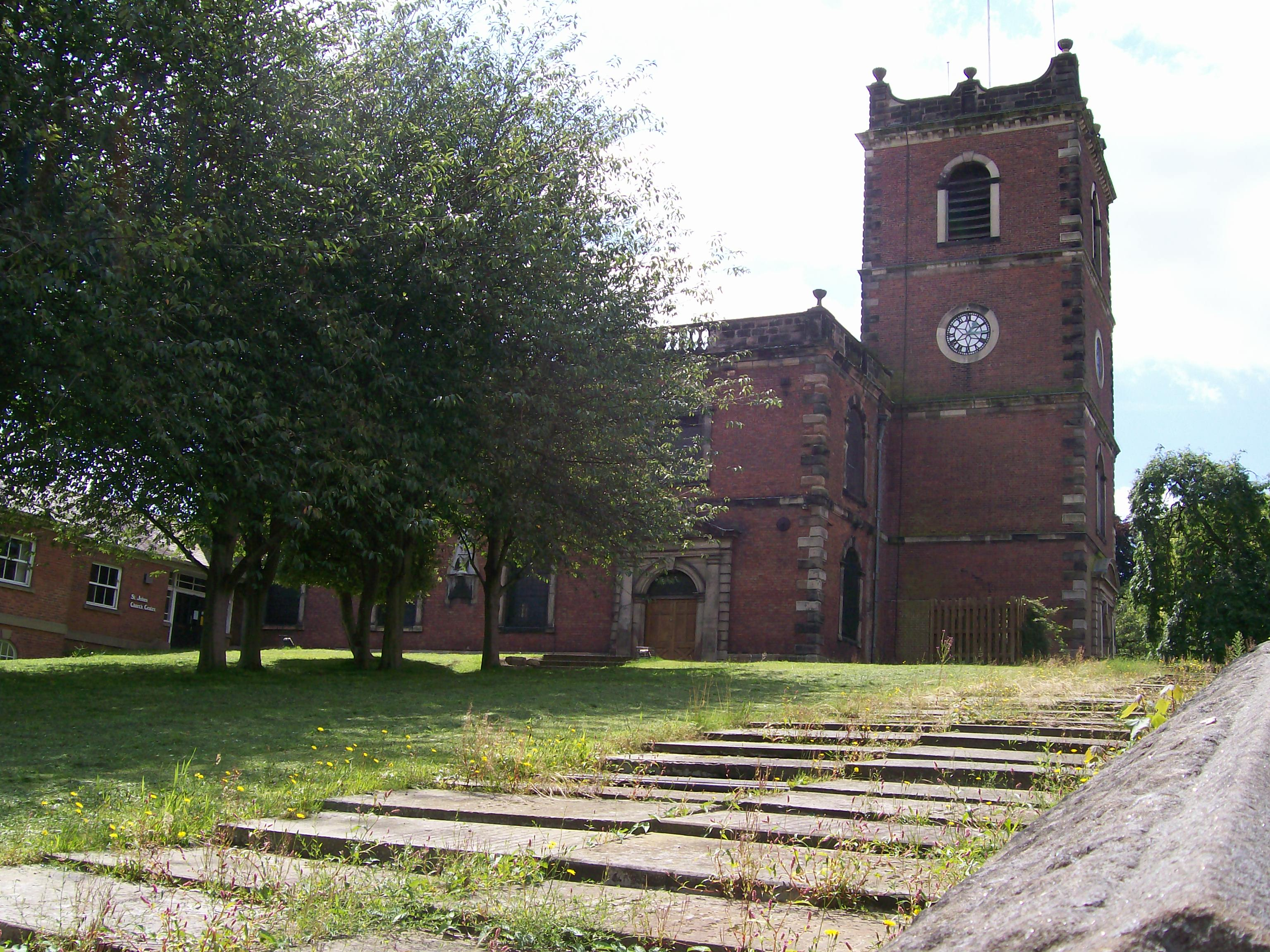
- St John the Baptist Church, Knutsford

- Location in Cheshire
- OS grid reference: SJ 753 785
- Location: Knutsford, Cheshire
- Country: England
- Denomination: Anglican
- Churchmanship: Conservative Evangelical
- Website: www.stjohnsknutsford.org.uk/index.php

History
- Status: Parish church
- Dedication: John the Baptist
- Consecrated: 1744

Architecture
- Functional status: Active
- Heritage designation: Grade II*
- Designated: 18 January 1949
- Architect(s): J. Garlive, Alfred Darbyshire
- Architectural type: Church
- Style: Neoclassical
- Completed: 1879
- Construction cost: £4,000 (equivalent to £860,000 in 2025)

Specifications
- Capacity: 525
- Materials: Brick with stone dressings Slate roof

Administration
- Province: York
- Diocese: Chester
- Archdeaconry: Macclesfield
- Deanery: Knutsford
- Parish: St John the Baptist, Knutsford

Clergy
- Vicar(s): The Revd Nigel Atkinson, The Revd Tom Hollingsbee

St John the Baptist's Church is in the town of Knutsford, Cheshire, England. The church is recorded in the National Heritage List for England as a designated Grade II* listed building. It is an active Anglican parish church in the diocese of Chester, the archdeaconry of Macclesfield and the deanery of Knutsford. Its benefice is combined with that of St John the Evangelist, Toft.

== History ==
Knutsford was a chapel of ease in the parish of St Mary's Church, Rostherne, until the 18th century. In 1741 an Act of Parliament was obtained for it to become a distinct parish. The church was built between 1741 and 1744 at a cost of £4,000 (equivalent to £860,000 in 2025), the architect being J. Garlive. In 1879 the apsidal chancel was extended and reordered by Alfred Darbyshire.

St John's is within the Conservative Evangelical tradition of the Church of England, and it has passed resolutions to uphold the teaching of Scripture and Catholic Order with regard to the ordained ministry. St Johns stands within the mainstream of Christian thinking as it has been understood from the beginning.

== Architecture ==
=== Exterior ===
The church is built in neoclassical style in brick with stone dressings and a slate roof. The plan of the church consists of a west tower, a two-storey nave and a shallow chancel. The tower is in four stages with a west doorway over which is a round-arched window, a clock and round-arched belfry windows. The top of the tower has a parapet with modillion brackets swept between urns. The parapet of the nave has alternating solid and balustraded panels. At the southwest is a doorway in a pedimented case with a rusticated architrave and a round-arched inner door. There is a similar doorway at the northwest.

=== Interior ===
The nave has a classical arcade of four bays with Tuscan columns on high bases carrying semicircular arches. Galleries are on the north, west and south sides. There are two fonts. One is made of marble and has an oak cover. It dates from the time of building of the church but spent some time in the garden of a private house. The other dates from 1865 and is in High Victorian style. An old parish chest is in the tower and in the church is a two-tier brass candelabrum donated in 1768. On the north wall is a pyramidal memorial to Ralph Leycester of Toft who died in 1776. Also in the church is a memorial to Elizabeth Leigh who died in 1823 which is signed by Richard Westmacott. The stained glass is by Heaton, Butler and Bayne. Two memorial boards are in the church which are believed to have been painted by members of the Randle Holme family of Chester. The three-manual organ was built in 1882 by Alex Young and Sons. There is a ring of six bells. Four of these were cast in 1748–49 by Rudhall of Gloucester: the other two were cast by John Taylor Ltd in 1996. The parish registers begin in 1581.

In 2014 reordering works to the interior were completed, designed by architects Graham Holland Associates. This involved the removal of the late-Victorian pews, and the installation of an oak floor, and glazed screens between the narthex and nave and at the three external doors. Four of the Victorian stained glass windows were relocated onto the Church Hill facade, while the two rows of windows in the aisles were replaced in a clear leaded Georgian design.

== External features ==
In the churchyard is a stone sundial probably dating from the late 18th century. It consists of a baluster-like pedestal on circular plinth. It is listed at Grade II.

== See also ==
- Grade II* listed buildings in Cheshire East
- Listed buildings in Knutsford
