= St Cross Church, Knutsford =

Coordinates: 53.3034°N 2.3670°W

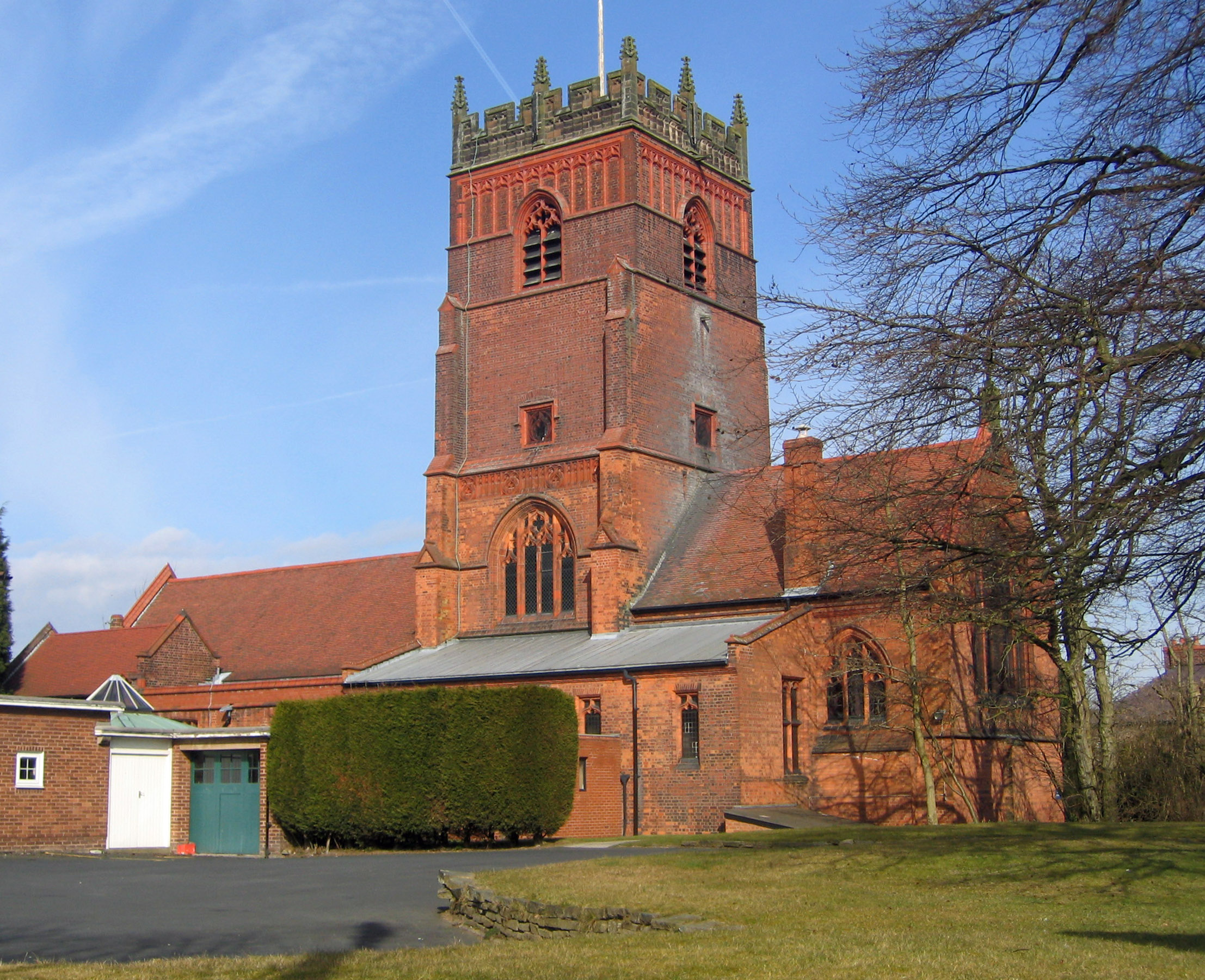
- St Cross Church, Knutsford, from the southeast

- Location in Cheshire
- OS grid reference: SJ 756,786
- Location: Knutsford, Cheshire
- Country: England
- Denomination: Anglican
- Website: St Cross, Knutsford

History
- Status: Parish church
- Dedication: Holy Cross

Architecture
- Functional status: Active
- Heritage designation: Grade II*
- Designated: 15 January 1974
- Architect: Paley and Austin
- Architectural type: Church
- Style: Gothic Revival

Specifications
- Materials: Brick with terracotta dressings and stone parapet Roof of red tiles and lead

Administration
- Province: York
- Diocese: Chester
- Archdeaconry: Macclesfield
- Deanery: Knutsford
- Parish: St Cross, Cross Town

Clergy
- Vicar: Rev Paul Deakin

St Cross Church is in the town of Knutsford, Cheshire, England. It is recorded in the National Heritage List for England as a designated Grade II* listed building, in the deanery of Knutsford, the archdeaconry of Macclesfield, and the diocese of Chester. It is an active Anglican parish church, with two services every Sunday, a midweek Eucharist each Wednesday, and Morning Prayer most weekdays. The Parish Electoral Roll is 140, and about sixty people attend Sunday morning services.

== History ==
The original church was dedicated in February 1858. The main part of the present church was built between 1880 and 1881 to a design by the Lancaster architects Paley and Austin. The tower was finished in 1887, and the church was completed in 1889 with the addition of the aisles. The final total cost was £7,580 (equivalent to £840,000 in 2025). The vestries were enlarged in 1906 by the successors in the practice, Austin and Paley.

== Architecture ==
=== Exterior ===
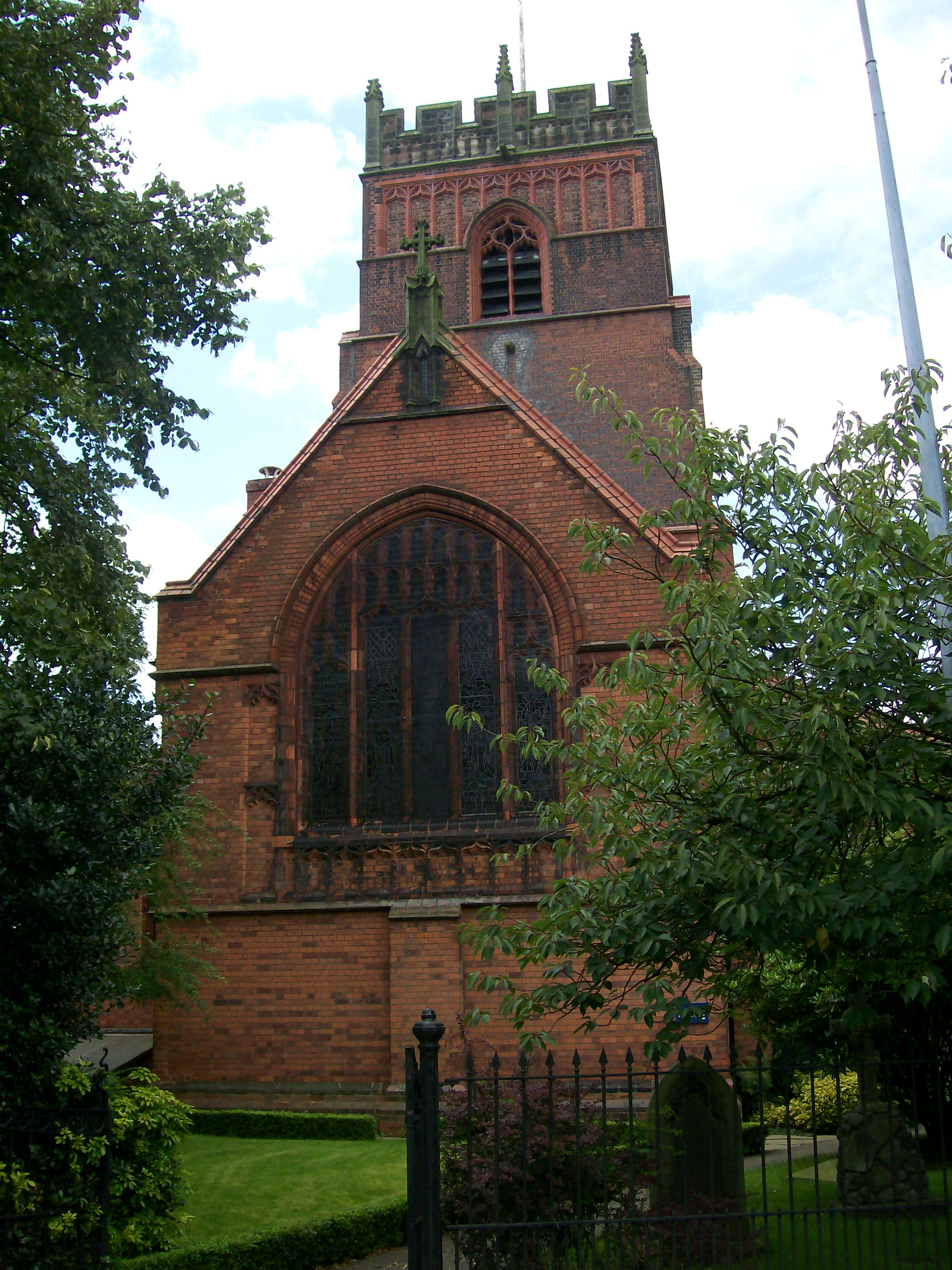

It is built in brick with terracotta dressings in Perpendicular style. The roof is in red tiles and lead. Its plan consists of a nave with north and south aisles, a tower at the crossing, and a chancel with north and south chapels. A two-storey vestry is on the south, and a porch is to the west of the north aisle. The tower is in three stages with a four-light Decorated style window above which is a terracotta frieze. In the second stage are small square windows. The upper stage contains two-light bell openings and a blind traceried frieze. The parapet is of stone with pinnacles at the angles and in the centre of each side.

=== Interior ===
Inside the church the north arcade has three bays, and the south arcade has two bays with the vestry occupying the western bay. The chancel screen and pulpit are both made from traceried timber. The organ occupies the chapel to the south of the chancel. On the south chancel wall is a sedilia with heavy terracotta Perpendicular tracery. In a wooden case on a pier of the south nave arcade is a low relief bronze sculpture dated 1607 depicting the Deposition from the Cross. Two of the stained glass windows were designed by Burne-Jones and made by Morris & Co. The west window is dated 1893 and depicts the Adoration of the Magi. The easternmost window in the south aisle is dated 1899 and shows the Good Samaritan.

== See also ==
- Grade II* listed buildings in Cheshire East
- Listed buildings in Knutsford
- List of ecclesiastical works by Paley and Austin
