= Michael Wrigley =

English cricketer and British Army officer

Personal information
- Full name: Michael Harold Wrigley
- Born: 30 July 1924; Rostherne, Cheshire, England
- Died: 13 January 1995 (aged 70); Leeds, Yorkshire, England
- Batting: Right-handed
- Bowling: Right-arm fast-medium

Domestic team information
- Years: Team
- 1948–1950: Oxford University
- 1948: Marylebone Cricket Club

Career statistics
Competition	First-class
Matches	16
Runs scored	71
Batting average	5.91
100s/50s	–/–
Top score	17
Balls bowled	2,548
Wickets	48
Bowling average	22.41
5 wickets in innings	3
10 wickets in match	–
Best bowling	6/57
Catches/stumpings	6/–
- Source: Cricinfo, 19 March 2019

Michael Harold Wrigley OBE (30 July 1924 – 13 January 1995) was an English first-class cricketer and British Army officer. After attending Harrow School during the Second World War, Wrigley served in the last year of the war with the Rifle Brigade. He later attended the University of Oxford, where he played first-class cricket for Oxford University Cricket Club (having also previously played for the Combined Services cricket team). He was recalled to the Rifle Brigade during the Korean War, before later serving in the Diplomatic Service, where he worked in the Far East.

== Early life and first-class cricket ==
Wrigley was born at Rostherne Manor in Rostherne, Cheshire. He was educated at Harrow School. After leaving Harrow he served in the latter stages of the Second World War, when he was commissioned into the Rifle Brigade as a second lieutenant in March 1944. A year after the conclusion of the war, he made his debut in first-class cricket for the Combined Services cricket team in a rain-affected match against Surrey at Kingston-upon-Thames in 1946.

He went up to Worcester College at the University of Oxford, where he made his debut for Oxford University Cricket Club in first-class cricket against the Free Foresters at Oxford in 1948. In that same year he toured Ireland with the Marylebone Cricket Club, playing in one first-class match against the Ireland cricket team at Dublin. Wrigley played first-class cricket for Oxford University until 1950, making fourteen appearances. Playing as a right-arm fast-medium bowler, he took 45 wickets for Oxford University at an average of 22.20, with best figures of 6 for 57. These figures were one of three five wicket hauls that he took during his first-class career, and came against Surrey in 1949 at The Oval. He gained a blue for cricket in 1949. He was a member of the Vincent's Club while at Oxford.

== Later life ==
In July 1951, during the Korean War, he was recommissioned into the Rifle Brigade on an emergency commission with the rank of lieutenant. He later worked as an intelligence officer in the Far East. He was later appointed as first secretary of British Embassay in Bangkok, in the service of which he was made an OBE in the 1971 Birthday Honours. Later in his life he was a farmer near Scarborough, North Yorkshire. He was a director of Pontefract Racecourse during the first half of the 1990s, a post he held until his death at Leeds in January 1995.
