= Listed buildings in Millington and Rostherne =

Millington and Rostherne is a civil parish in Cheshire East, England. It contains 14 buildings that are recorded in the National Heritage List for England as designated listed buildings. Of these, one is listed at Grade I, the highest of the three grades, and the others are at Grade II, the lowest grade. The parish contains the village of Rostherne, the hamlet of Millington, and the surrounding countryside. The listed buildings consist of houses and cottages, a church and structures in the churchyard, a former chapel, a water tower and an estate lodge.

== Key ==
Grade	Criteria
I	Buildings of exceptional interest, sometimes considered to be internationally important
II	Buildings of national importance and special interest

== Buildings ==
Name and location	Photograph	Date	Notes	Grade
St Mary's Church; 53.34949°N 2.38801°W		14th century	The steeple fell in 1741 damaging the body of the church. In 1742–44 the body of the church was rebuilt together with the present tower. The chancel and the north vestry date from 1888 and were designed by Arthur Blomfield. The church is constructed in sandstone with roof of slate and lead. It consists of a nave with aisles, a chancel with chapels, a vestry, and a west tower, and is in a mixture of Gothic and Neoclassical styles. In the roof of the nave are dormers.	I
Cecily Mill; 53.34423°N 2.39288°W	—	1650	A timber-framed house on a brick plinth with brick infill and a stone-slate roof. It is in two storeys with casement windows, one in a dormer. To the right is a later wing with a mullioned window in the ground floor. Inside the house is an inglenook and a wall with wattle and daub infill.	II
Boothbank Farmhouse; 53.36204°N 2.41462°W		c. 1670	The farmhouse is in brick with roofs in slate and stone-slate. It is in two storeys with a basement and an attic, and has a three-bay front. Projecting from the front is a two-storey porch with a moulded doorcase. The windows are mullioned and contain casements.	II
Denfield Cottage; 53.35085°N 2.40889°W	—	Late 17th century	The house was extended in the 18th century, and a porch was added in the 20th century. The whole house is in two storeys, has a thatched roof, and contains casement windows. The original part is timber-framed on a stone plinth, and has a dormer in the upper floor. The 18th-century portion to the left is in stone, and the porch is timber-framed.	II
Mere Covert Cottage; 53.35771°N 2.38243°W	—	Late 17th century	A timber-framed cottage with brick infill and a slate roof. There is some brickwork at the rear. The cottage is in two storeys, and has casement windows.	II
Millington Hall; 53.35620°N 2.41032°W	—	Late 17th century	A farmhouse that was extended in the 18th and 19th centuries. It is built in brick on a stone plinth and has a slate roof. The farmhouse is in two storeys, and has a gabled porch with a large lintel over the door. The windows are casements with stone sills, and at the rear is a large staircase window.	II
Hill Farmhouse; 53.34884°N 2.38894°W	—	Late 17th to early 18th century	A brick farmhouse with a slate roof. It is in two storeys and has a three-bay front. There are brick bands between the storeys and above the upper windows. The windows are casements.	II
Sundial; 53.34934°N 2.38822°W		c. 1730	The sundial is in the churchyard of St Mary's Church. It is a circular stone structure about 4 feet (1.2 m) high, and consists of a baluster column on a base. On it is an inscribed plate. The gnomon is broken.	II
Chapel House; 53.36558°N 2.41384°W	—	1759	This originated as Baptist chapel to which a house was added in the 19th century. It became a Wesleyan Methodist chapel in 1834, regular services ended in 1941, it was sold in 1955, and has been converted into a single dwelling. The house is in brick with a Welsh slate roof, and is in two storeys. The windows are casements.	II
Ivy Cottages; 53.34715°N 2.38642°W		Late 18th century	A terrace of three brick cottages with slate roofs. They are in two storeys, and have a front facing the street of eight bays.	II
Rostherne Lodge; 53.34082°N 2.37930°W		1834	The lodge was designed by James Hakewell, and is at the entrance to Tatton Park. It is built in stone with a lead roof, and is in one storey with a basement. At the front is a Greek Doric portico with six columns carrying an entablature containing triglyphs, guttae, metopes and a plain pediment. The windows are sash windows. At the rear is another open portico, this one having two columns and no entablature.	II
Water Tower at Montebello Castle; 53.34945°N 2.40435°W	—	1850s	The water tower, which was embellished in about 1891, is in dark orange brick, with decoration in Accrington brick, and details in terracotta. There are three storeys and a single-storey lean-to. On the tower is a string course and an oculus, and at the top is a corbel table carrying false machicolations, decorative crenellation, polygonal tourelles on the angles, and pinnacles. On the east face is a relief of a lion or a sphinx.	II
Simpson tomb 53.34896°N 2.38813°W		c. 1861	The tomb is in the churchyard of St Mary's Church. It is in sandstone, and consists of a casket standing on a plinth. On the casket are four columns with foliated capitals that carry four gables surmounted by a small spire. On the sides of the casket are panels, one of which is inscribed, and around the tomb are ornamental railings.	II
Lady Mary's Square; 53.34626°N 2.38545°W		1909	A group of 13 terraced houses and a laundry building forming three sides of a rectangle. They are built in rendered brick with slate roofs. The building in the extreme right is the laundry building; this and the house on the extreme left have three bays while all the other houses are in two bays. All the buildings are in two storeys, apart from the central two houses, which have three. The houses have gabled porches, and the windows are casements.	II
