= River Lily =

Stream in Cheshire, England

Coordinates: 53.297270°N 2.367190°W

River Lily is a small stream that flows through Knutsford, England. It has been claimed that it is the smallest river in the world . It enters Tatton Mere by running under an unmade road.
