= Governor's House, Knutsford =

House in Knutsford, Cheshire, England

Coordinates: 53.30145°N 2.37367°W

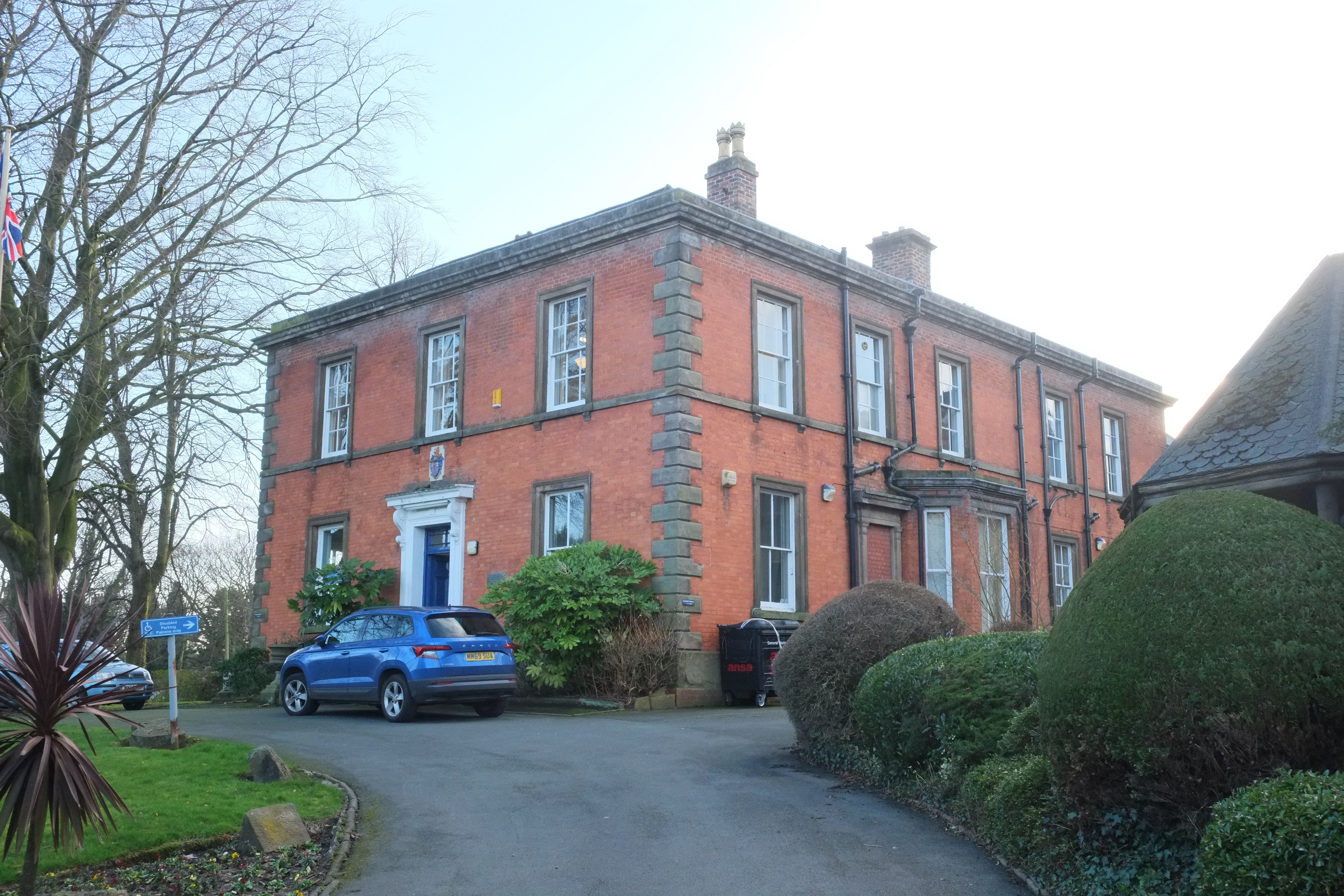
Former Governor's House, now Town Council Offices

The former Governor's House is located in Toft Road, Knutsford, Cheshire, England. It was built for the governor of Knutsford Gaol, and has later been used as a Tourist Information Centre. It was built in 1844 and designed by the Lancaster architect Edmund Sharpe. It is recorded in the National Heritage List for England as a designated Grade II listed building. The house is constructed in red brick in Georgian style. It served as the central offices for the Knutsford Urban District Council, and then for Knutsford Town Council which have been located there since the council formed in 1974.

== See also ==
- List of architectural works by Edmund Sharpe
