= Knutsford Town Council =

UK local authority for the town of Knutsford, Cheshire, England

- Whole council elected every four years
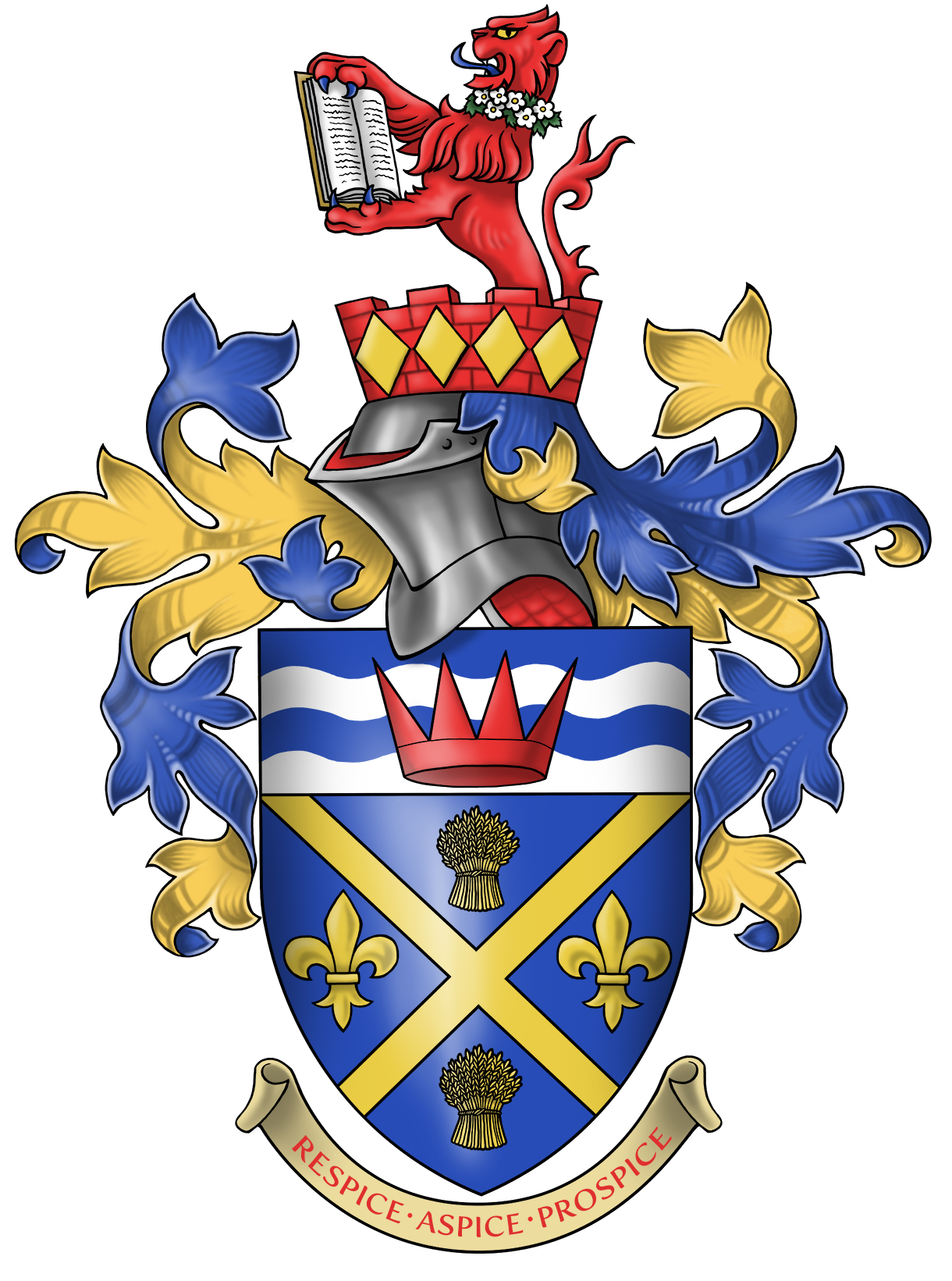
- Coat of arms

Type
- Type: Town Council

History
- Founded: 1974
- Preceded by: Knutsford Urban District Council

Leadership
- Town Mayor: Cllr Peter Coan
- Deputy Mayor: Cllr Lesley Dalzell
- Town Clerk (Acting): Bob Allen

Structure
- Seats: 15 councillors
- Independent: 9 / 15
- Conservative: 6 / 15

Elections
- Last election: 2023
- Next election: 2027

Motto
- Looking to the Past, the Present and the Future

Meeting place
- Knutsford Council Offices

Website
- www.knutsfordtowncouncil.gov.uk

Knutsford Town Council is the town council for the Cheshire Market Town of Knutsford. It was established in 1974 as a successor council to the Knutsford Urban District Council. The last full council elections were held in May 2023, four wards were uncontested whilst a poll was held in the fifth. The elections saw the Conservatives lose control of the council with 10 Independent councillors elected and five Conservatives. The council is split into five wards, Nether (3), Norbury Booths (3), St John's Wood (3), Cross Town (3) and Bexton and Town Centre (3).

== Precursor ==
The Knutsford Urban District Council was an Urban District Council for the town of Knutsford, Cheshire from 1895 to 1974. It was established in 1895 following the establishment and dissolution of parish councils created under the Local Government Act 1894 for Nether Knutsford and Over Knutsford. The Urban District Council was dissolved in 1974 upon the creation of the Knutsford Town Council.

== Powers and functions ==
The Town Council derives the bulk of its powers from the Local Government Act 1972 and subsequent legislation. The Council adopted the General Power of Competence in 2013 giving it a greater range of powers in line with the Localism Act 2011. The Town Council is a Market Authority, operating an Indoor Market Hall and licensing other markets within its boundary, including a monthly Makers' Market of artisan and local producers. The Town Council operates public toilets, a cemetery and chapel, and Allotments and is seeking to take certain open spaces from Cheshire East Council. The Town Council delivers a programme of community events and undertakes a range of initiatives to support the town centre.

== Town Mayor ==
At its inception the newly formed Town Council resolved that the Chairman be styled Town Mayor. The Mayor is elected annually at the Annual Council Meeting in May. The incumbent is Cllr Bryan Hartley who took office in May 2025. The Mayor acts a Leader/Chairman of the Town Council and also undertakes an important ambassadorial role, attending community events, opening shops and businesses and acting as a representative of the town in neighbouring areas. The Mayor also hosts a number of fundraising events throughout the year raising money for chosen charities.

== Accolades ==
The Town Council holds Quality Gold status under the Local Council Award Scheme.

In 2021, Town Clerk to Knutsford Town Council, Adam Keppel-Green, was named Clerk of the Year in the NALC Star Council Awards.

The Town Council took back management of Knutsford Cemetery in 2020 and since 2022 it has been accredited as a Green Flag space.

The Town Council was awarded a Defra Bees Needs Award in 2025 in recognition of its work supporting pollinators as part of its Nature Action Plan.

== Elections ==
=== 2023 Election ===
Elections were held on 4 May 2023 on the same day as elections to Cheshire East Council. These are the first elections following a community governance review which changes the town boundary and modifies the number of wards. Four wards were uncontested returning councillors unopposed, Cross Town ward was contested and a poll was held on 4 May 2023. The election saw the end of a Conservative majority. In 2026, Cllr Bryan Hartley joined the Conservative group.

Bexton and Town Centre Ward
Party	Candidate	Votes	%	±%
Conservative	Stewart Gardiner	unopposed		
Independent	April Johnson	unopposed		
Independent	Gus Watson	unopposed		

Cross Town Ward (3 seats)
Party	Candidate	Votes	%
Conservative	Peter Coan	393	23.25%
Independent	Lesley Dalzell	473	27.99%
Independent	Rex Mears	484	28.64%
Conservative	Tim Regan	340	20.12%

Nether Ward
Party	Candidate	Votes	%	±%
Independent	Bryan Hartley	unopposed		
Independent	Scott Lowe	unopposed		
Independent	Matthew Wood	unopposed		

Norbury Booths Ward
Party	Candidate	Votes	%	±%
Conservative	Christopher Gray	unopposed		
Conservative	Matthew Robertson	unopposed		
Independent	Su Russell	unopposed		

St John’s Wood Ward
Party	Candidate	Votes	%	±%
Independent	Colin Banks	unopposed		
Independent	James McCulloch	unopposed		
Conservative	Jennifer Forrest	unopposed		

=== By-Elections 2019-2023 ===
Two by-elections were held in May 2021. A by-election for Nether Ward was triggered in April 2020 following the resignation of Katherine Fletcher who had been elected as an MP in December 2019 whilst a by-election for Bexton Ward was triggered following the death of Cllr Barbara Hamilton Coan in November 2020. Both elections had been on hold until May 2021 due to the moratorium on elections under the Coronavirus Act 2020. In February 2023, Cllr Jan Nicholson resigned as Deputy Town Mayor and councillor, the vacancy was left unfilled until the May 2023 elections.

Bexton Ward - By-election 2021
Party	Candidate	Votes	%	±%
Liberal Democrats	Amy Rosalind Hobson	394	48.28	
Conservative	Millie Morris	422 elected	51.72	

Nether Ward - By-election 2021
Party	Candidate	Votes	%	±%
Conservative	Annie Greer	319	37.09	
Independent	Scott Lowe	379 elected	44.07	
Liberal Democrats	Bill Tenger	162	18.84	

=== 2019 Election ===
Elections were held for all four wards in May 2019. All elections were uncontested and one vacancy was left on Over Ward which was filled by co-option with Conservative Elizabeth Beswick.

Bexton Ward
Party	Candidate	Votes	%	±%
Conservative	Barbara Hamilton Coan	unopposed		
Conservative	Mike Houghton	unopposed		
Conservative	James Power	unopposed		

Nether Ward
Party	Candidate	Votes	%	±%
Conservative	Katherine Fletcher	unopposed		
Conservative	Christopher Gray	unopposed		
Conservative	Stewart Gardiner	unopposed		

Norbury Booths Ward
Party	Candidate	Votes	%	±%
Independent	Quentin Abel	unopposed		
Conservative	Jan Nicholson	unopposed		
Conservative	Matthew Robertson	unopposed		

Over Ward
Party	Candidate	Votes	%	±%
Conservative	Peter Coan	unopposed		
Independent	Lesley Dalzell	unopposed		
Conservative	Neil Forbes	unopposed		
Conservative	James McCulloch	unopposed		
Independent	Andrew Malloy	unopposed		
	Uncontested			

=== By-Elections 2015-2019 ===
A by-election was held for Norbury Booths ward on 5 April 2018 following the resignation of incumbent Independent Councillor Charlotte Greenstein

Norbruy Booths Ward - By-election 2018
Party	Candidate	Votes	%	±%
Independent	Quentin Abel	233	32.15	
Conservative	Elizabeth Beswick	496 elected	67.85	

A by-election was held for Over ward on 4 May 2017 following the resignation of incumbent Independent Councillor Yvonne Bancroft

Over Ward - By-election 2017
Party	Candidate	Votes	%	±%
Independent	Rebecca O’Rourke	364	30.30	
Labour	David Stephenson	305	25.40	
Conservative	Jon Wells Bradshaw	532 elected	44.30	

=== 2015 Election ===
Elections were held on 7 May 2015 for the four wards of the Town Council on the same day as elections to Cheshire East Council and Tatton (UK Parliament constituency) Parliamentary seat. Bexton Ward was not contested with the three candidates being elected unopposed. Nether Ward ended in a dead heat between two candidates, settled by the drawing of lots.

Nether Ward
Party	Candidate	Votes	%	±%
Conservative	Christopher Gray	690 elected	24.25	
Conservative	Stewart Gardiner	855 elected	30.05	
Conservative	James Power	650 elected	22.85	
Independent	Julie Tempest	650	22.85	

Norbury Booths Ward
Party	Candidate	Votes	%	±%
Independent	Charlotte Greenstein	802 elected	23.55	
Conservative	Janet Nicholson	970 elected	28.48	
Conservative	Hayley Wells-Bradshaw	870 elected	25.54	
Conservative	Jon Wells-Bradshaw	764	22.43	

Bexton Ward
Party	Candidate	Votes	%	±%
Conservative	Tony Dean	unopposed		
Conservative	Christine Gray	unopposed		
Conservative	Simon Hutchence	unopposed		

Over Ward
Party	Candidate	Votes	%	±%
Independent	Yvonne Bancroft	1209 elected	15.70	
Conservative	Peter Coan	886 elected	11.51	
Conservative	Jonathan Farber	905 elected	11.75	
Conservative	Neil Forbes	921 elected	11.96	
Conservative	Jane Froehlich	819	10.64	
Conservative	Julian Goodrich	871 elected	11.31	
Conservative	Michael Houghton	811	10.53	
Independent	Andrew Malloy	1278 elected	16.60	

=== By-Elections 2011-2015 ===
A by-election was held for Nether Ward on 13 November 2014 following the death of incumbent Conservative Councillor, Clive Nicholson.

Nether Ward - By-election 2014
Party	Candidate	Votes	%	±%
Conservative	Christopher Gray	271 elected	55.96	
Independent	Julie Tempest	160	32.45	
Labour	Graeme Webster	62	12.57	

A by-election was held for Over Ward on 7 February following the resignation of incumbent Conservative Councillor Bernadette Emmett.

Over Ward - By-election 2013
Party	Candidate	Votes	%	±%
Independent	Yvonne Bancroft	368 elected	50.69	
Conservative	Paul Hamilton	258	35.54	
UKIP	Gerald Norden	100	13.77	

=== 2011 Election ===
Elections were held on 5 May 2011. Both Norbury Booths and Nether Wards were uncontested, returning three Conservative councillors each.

Bexton Ward 2011
Party	Candidate	Votes	%	±%
Liberal Democrats	Caroline Aldhouse	341	19.92	
Liberal Democrats	Francis Aldhouse CBE	338	19.74	
Liberal Democrats	Barbara Austin	454	26.52	
Conservative	Tony Dean	579 elected	33.82	
Conservative	Michael Houghton	568 elected	33.18	
Conservative	Simon Hutchence	501 elected	29.26	

Bexton Ward 2011
Party	Candidate	Votes	%	±%
Conservative	Barbara Coan	686 elected	11.49	
Conservative	Peter Coan	691 elected	11.58	
Conservative	Bernadette Emmett	771 elected	12.92	
Conservative	Neil Forbes	696 elected	11.66	
Conservative	Julian Goodrich	698 elected	11.69	
Independent	David Heffernan	645	10.81	
Liberal Democrats	Barbara Kay	477	7.99	
Independent	Andrew Malloy	665 elected	11.14	
Conservative	Charles Mountain	640	10.72	

Nether Ward 2011
Party	Candidate	Votes	%	±%
Conservative	Vivien Davies	unopposed		
Conservative	Stewart Gardiner	unopposed		
Conservative	Clive Nicholson	unopposed		

Norbury Booths Ward 2011
Party	Candidate	Votes	%	±%
Conservative	Gary Lasham	unopposed		
Conservative	Janet Nicholson	unopposed		
Conservative	Peter Raynes	unopposed		
