= Rostherne =

Village in Cheshire, England

Coordinates: 53.350°N 2.383°W

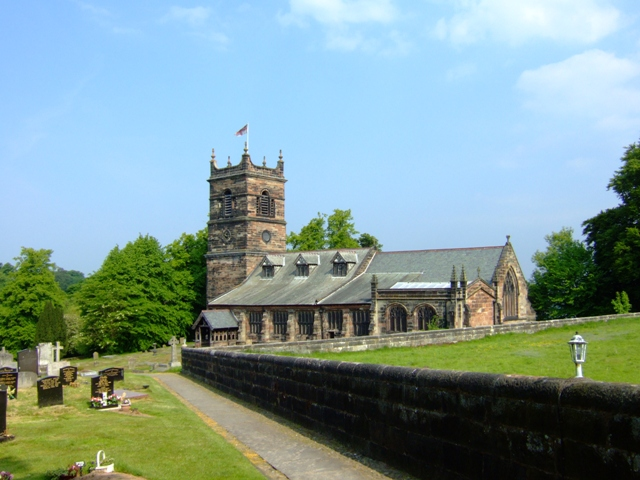
- Saint Mary's Church, Rostherne

- Location within Cheshire
- Population: 160 (2001 census)
- OS grid reference: SJ744837
- Civil parish: Millington and Rostherne
- Unitary authority: Cheshire East
- Ceremonial county: Cheshire
- Region: North West
- Country: England
- Sovereign state: United Kingdom
- Post town: KNUTSFORD
- Postcode district: WA16
- Dialling code: 01565
- Police: Cheshire
- Fire: Cheshire
- Ambulance: North West
- UK Parliament: Tatton

Rostherne is a village and former civil parish, now in the parish of Millington and Rostherne, in the unitary authority area of Cheshire East and the ceremonial county of Cheshire, England (grid reference SJ743835). In 2001 the parish had a population of 160.

To the north of the village is Rostherne Mere and to the south is Tatton Park. The A556 road passes to its west.

== History ==
In the 11th century Rostherene was called Rodestorne, said to mean the Lake of the Holy Cross, from the Anglo-Saxon Rodes, meaning cross and the northern word torne or tarne meaning lake. At the time of the Domesday Book the parish belonged to Gilbert de Venables, Baron of Kinderton, who displaced Ulviet the Saxon as owner of the lands, although there was then only one rateable field in the parish, one team and two acres of wood, the whole only being worth four shillings a year. By 1286 almost all of Rostherne had become part of the Tatton estate, having been sold to Massey of Tatton, except for a portion retained by the Leghs.

On 1 April 2023 the parish was abolished to form "Millington and Rostherne".

== Buildings ==
St Mary's Church, Rostherne, is a Grade I listed building, whose rectory was for many centuries in the possession of the Leighs of West Hall, High Legh.

== Notable people ==
- Michael Wrigley (1924-1995), first-class cricketer, British Army officer and civil servant

== See also ==
- Listed buildings in Millington and Rostherne
