= St Mary's Church, Rostherne =

Coordinates: 53.3495°N 2.3880°W

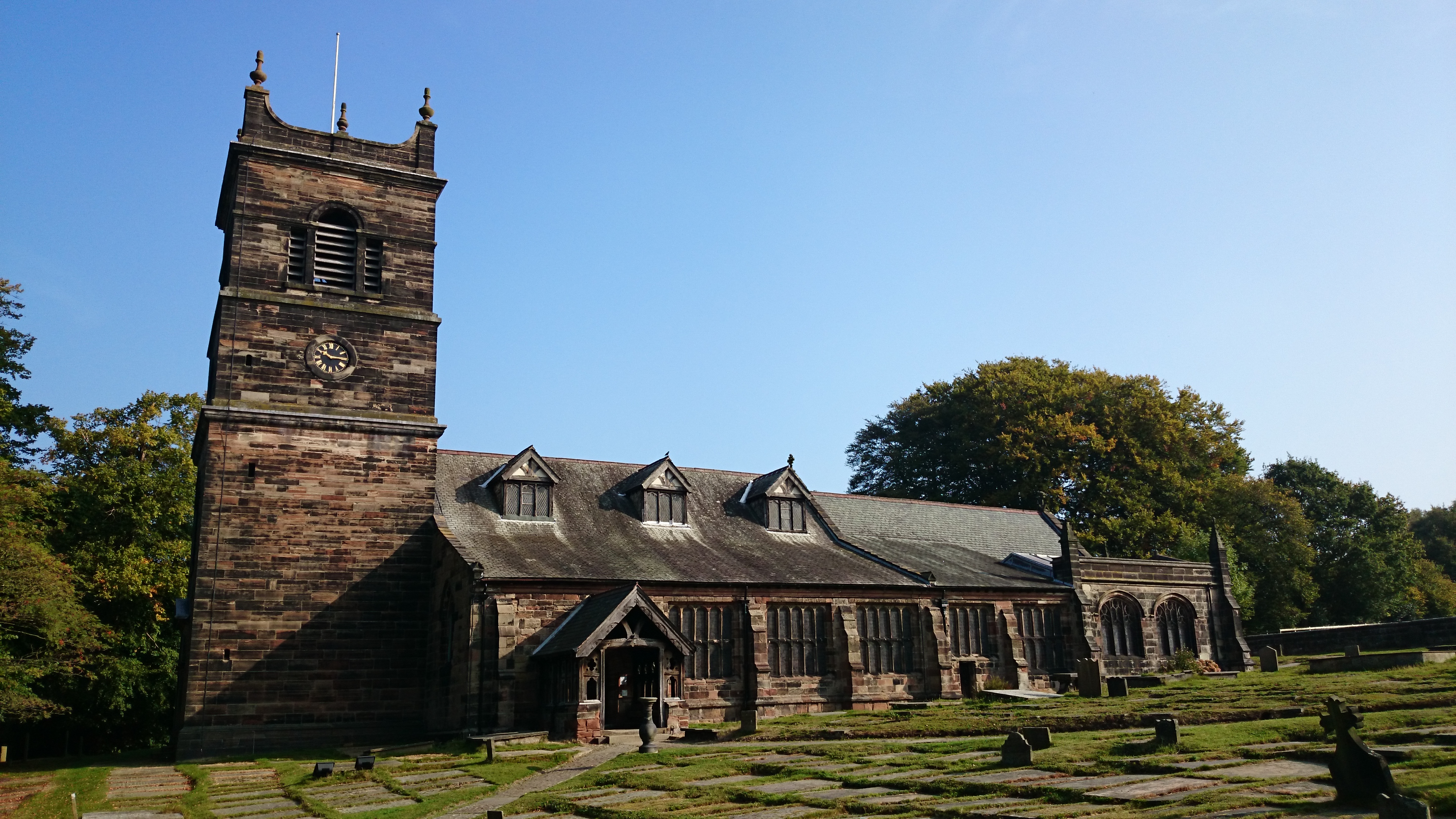
- St Mary's Church, Rostherne

- Location in Cheshire
- OS grid reference: SJ 743 837
- Location: Rostherne, Cheshire
- Country: England
- Denomination: Anglican
- Website: St Mary, Rostherne

History
- Status: Parish church

Architecture
- Functional status: Active
- Heritage designation: Grade I
- Designated: 5 March 1959
- Architect(s): John Rowson; Sir Arthur Blomfield
- Architectural type: Church
- Style: Gothic, Neoclassical
- Completed: 1888

Specifications
- Materials: Sandstone; Slate and lead roof

Administration
- Province: York
- Diocese: Chester
- Archdeaconry: Macclesfield
- Deanery: Knutsford
- Parish: Rostherne with Bollington and Over Tabley

Clergy
- Vicar: Revd Robert Sydney Thewsey

St Mary's Church lies between the village of Rostherne and Rostherne Mere in Cheshire, England. The church is recorded in the National Heritage List for England as a designated Grade I listed building. It is an active Anglican parish church in the diocese of Chester, the archdeaconry of Macclesfield and the deanery of Knutsford. Its Parish is united with that of Holy Trinity, Little Bollington and St Paul's, Over Tabley.

== History ==
Little is known about the early history of the church. There is no reference to a church at Rostherne in the Domesday Book but a deed dated 1188 states that a church had been built and endowed on the site. A steeple was built in 1533. In 1666 there was an inscription on the south side of the tower seeking prayers for the soul of William Hardwick and for his Parishioners. The steeple collapsed in November 1741 after some years' deterioration and neglect. The present tower was erected and the body of the church which had been damaged by the fall was rebuilt between 1742 and 1744, the architect being John Rowson. The chancel and north vestry date from 1888 and are by Sir Arthur Blomfield. The south porch dates from around 1886. The restoration of the church was commissioned in 1888 by Wilbraham Egerton, 1st Earl Egerton in memory of his father, Baron Egerton.

== Architecture ==
=== Exterior ===
The tower and church are built in sandstone with a slate and lead roof. The tower is to the west, there is a nave of four bays with side aisles, a chancel of four bays with side chapels, and a vestry. The tower is in three diminishing stages with a clock face on the south side. The bell openings are Venetian in type. The parapet curves upwards at the corners with vases on the corners and in the middle of the sides. Unusually the roof of the nave has dormer windows. The church is Perpendicular in style, other than the north doorway and the west window in the vestry which have Decorated features.

=== Interior ===
The interior of the church has a mixture of Gothic and classical styles. In the chancel is the recumbent effigy of a knight dating from around the reign of Henry III which came to light as a result of the fall of the tower in 1741. Elsewhere in the church is the freestanding memorial to Charlotte Lucy Beatrix Egerton who drowned in Rostherne Mere on the eve of her wedding in 1845. It is by Richard Westmacott Jr. and depicts Charlotte lying on her side with an angel stooping over her. Also in the church is a wall monument to Samuel Egerton by John Bacon dated 1792. This is made from variegated white and grey marble and includes high relief figures representing Hope and Patience. Also by Bacon is a monument to Jonas Langford Brooke, who died in 1784. Elsewhere in the church are other monuments and memorials to the Egerton family, and to the Venables, Cholmondeley, Leigh and Brooke families.

The organ was built in 1906 by A. Young, and was reconstructed between 1970 and 1979 by Sixsmith. There is a ring of six bells, the oldest of which date from 1630 and 1655. The other four were cast by Rudhall of Gloucester in 1717, 1771, 1782 and 1785. The parish registers begin in 1595 and the churchwardens' accounts in 1673.

== External features ==
Outside the church is a lych gate dating from 1640 which Richards considers to be the best example in Cheshire. It has a self-closing mechanism to keep animals out of the churchyard. In the churchyard is a sundial dating from around 1730 which is listed at Grade II. Also listed at Grade II is the ashlar sandstone Simpson tomb dating from around 1831. In addition the churchyard contains the war graves of five soldiers of World War I.

== In popular culture ==
The 2022 Christmas special episode of Inside No. 9, "The Bones of St Nicholas", was filmed in its entirety in the church.

== Previous Incumbents ==
1188 Hugh de Venables

1210 Walter (Sac'dote) and Robert Parson - Divided Rectory

1220 William de Massey

1250 John de Sandbach

1298 Roger de Venables

1319 Adam de Southwych

1323 John Paignell (or Payaol)

1345 John de Craven

1357 Richard de Wolverton and Thomas de Crewe

1360 Alex de Ange

1368 Thomas de Bedenhale

1396 Roger Venables

1436 John de Hulme

1438 Richard de Crosse

1456 Thomas Legh

1485 Thomas Savage

- Savage became Bishop or Rochester in 1496

- Savage became Bishop of Lincoln in 1499

- Savage became Archbishop of York in 1501

1496 John Giglis

- Giglis became Bishop of Worchester in 1497

1498 James Stanley

- Stanley became Bishop of Ely in 1506

1506 Hugh Hyll

1507 Hugh Hyll and Randle Boydell

1528 William Hardwick

1554 Peter Shaw (Vyker)

1557 Robert Swann

1580 William Wilmot and William Bradwell

1585 William Brownell

1597 John Chaddock

1599 John Chaddock

1630 William Shenton

1649 Adam Martindale

1662 Bengmain Crosse

1672 John Wall M.A.

1726 John Hayward

1730 John Addenbrook

1738 Robert Frodsham

1758 Ellis Farnworth M.A. and Joshua Powell

1787 Shalcross Jackson M.A.

1821 Joseph Horden M.A.

1855 Henry Ireland Blackburne M.A.

1858 George Gainsford M.A.

1862 Alfred Richard DeCane M.A.

1871 Thomas Foster Clarke M.A.

1897 Charles Henru Congbeare M.A.

1919 Thomas Arthur Hanson L.Th.

1934 John Hughes M.C., M.A. - Canon of Chester Cathedral

1957 Thomas Fish Ph.D., M.A.

1874 Noel Desmond Rogers T.V., B.A. - Canon of Chester Cathedral

2009 Philip John Robinson B.A.

2024 Robert Sydney Thewsey M.A.

== See also ==
- Grade I listed buildings in Cheshire East
- Grade I listed churches in Cheshire
- Listed buildings in Millington and Rostherne
