= St Peter's Church, Manchester =

Former church in Lancashire, England

Coordinates: 53°28′40″N 2°14′37″W

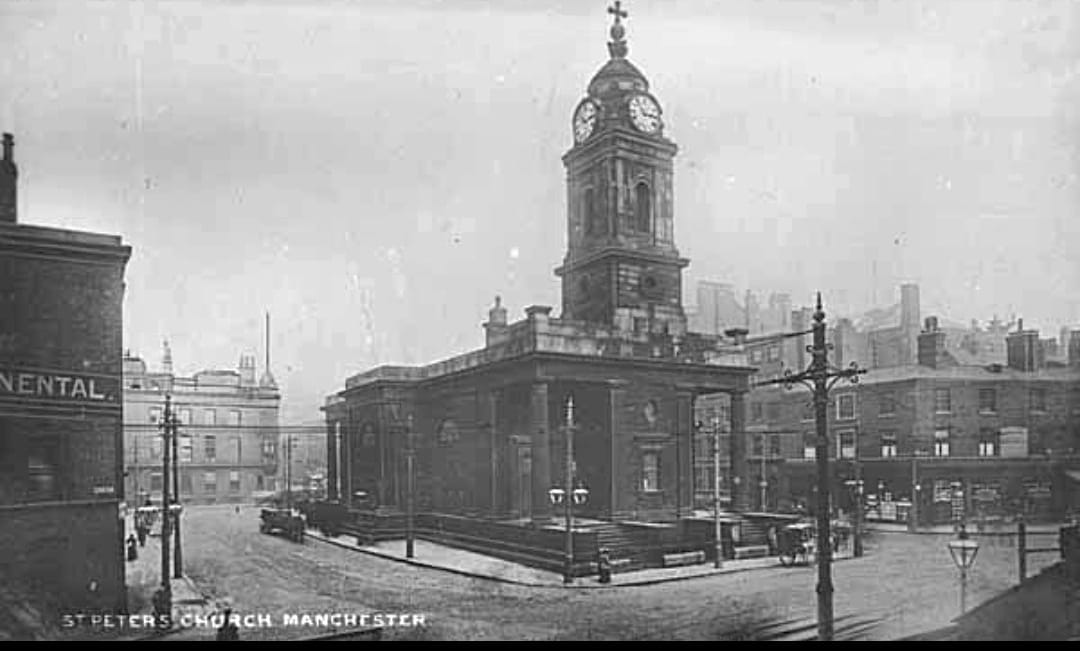
- St Peter's Church in St Peter's Square, c.1900
- St Peter's Church, Manchester
- OS grid reference: SJ 83929 97915
- Address: St Peter's Square, Manchester
- Country: England
- Denomination: Church of England

History
- Status: Parish church
- Dedication: Saint Peter
- Consecrated: 1794

Architecture
- Architect: James Wyatt
- Style: Neoclassical Doric
- Groundbreaking: 11 December 1788
- Demolished: 1907

Administration
- Diocese: Chester (Manchester after 1847)

St Peter's Church was a Church of England church in Manchester, in the historic county of Lancashire (now Greater Manchester). It was designed in a Neoclassical style by the English architect James Wyatt and opened in 1794. The church closed due to a dwindling congregation and it was demolished in 1907. Today its location is marked by a tall stone cross in St Peter's Square.

== History ==
Around the 1780s, Manchester's population was beginning to expand, and as the Industrial Revolution increased prosperity, there was a growth of church building in the town. St Peter's Church was established to provide a place of Christian worship for the town's expanding population. The Manchester Mercury of 9 December 1788 recorded: "We hear that the first stone of an intended new church in this town, to be called St, Peter's will be laid on Thursday next. The building is to be executed in stone after designs drawn by James Wyatt, Esq., of London, and wholly conducted under the direction of that eminent architect. There is therefore every reason to expect that this church, when completed will prove in a high degree commodious as a place of public worship and ornamental as an elegant structure."

The church's first incumbent was the Rev Samuel Hall, a curate of St Ann's Church, who lived in one of the first houses to be built on the new Oxford Road (later Oxford Street). Rev Hall served as honorary chaplain to the Manchester and Salford Volunteers. During church parades, he was known to omit the Athanasian Creed out of regard for the Nonconformists among their ranks, and this concession was controversial enough for Hall to be denied a position as a Fellow of Manchester Collegiate Church. Instead, his supporters raised the funds for St Peter's to be built, with Hall as the vicar. The foundation stone was laid on 11 December 1788 and bore the inscription:

The first stone of this Edifice, to be consecrated to the service of God, was laid on Thursday the 11th Day of December, in the year 1788, by the Revd. Samuel Hall, the intended minister, and A Considerable Number of the Principal Merchants and Inhabitants of this Town; Liberal Supporters of this Pious work.

At the time of its construction, St Peter's was bounded by countryside on its south, west and east sides, with open fields running down to the River Medlock. By 1801, a public square had been formed around the church, St Peter's Square, and Oxford Street and Peter Street had been laid out, although Lower Mosley Street was still an unnamed track running through the fields to the south.

St Peter's Church was consecrated on 6 September 1794 by the Bishop of Chester, William Cleaver. The essayist Thomas De Quincey had been a pupil of Rev Hall, and as a young boy, he was among the parishioners present at the consecration. He later recalled attending the ceremony in his 1821 article, Confessions of an English Opium-Eater:

When I must have been nearing my tenth year, and when St. Peter's had been finished, occurred the opening, and, consequently (as an indispensable pre-condition), the consecration of that edifice by the bishop of the diocese (viz.. Chester). I, as a ward of the incumbent, was naturally amongst those specially invited to the festival.

— Thomas De Quincey, 'Confessions of an English Opium-Eater (1821)

From its inception, the church attracted the wealthy townsfolk; Canon C. W. Bardsley wrote that the church "became at once the shrine to which the fashionable sinners of Mosley Street and Piccadilly turned their steps one day in seven." The church developed a strong musical tradition, and the inclusion of music in worship "made St Peter's the haunt of all the frequenters of the Assembly Rooms and fashionable idlers of the town. It was place of resort rather than a temple of worship."

An organ installed in the church was the largest in England at the time, with 3,728 pipes. A copy of this instrument was subsequently installed in the Free Trade Hall, later destroyed in 1940 during the Manchester Blitz.

The open fields to the west became known as St Peter's Field, named after the church. In 1819, a crowd of protestors gathered here demanding Parliamentary reform; this protest was violently put down by army forces. James Wroe, editor of the Manchester Observer, condemned the military action and coined the name "Peterloo Massacre", a portmanteau of "St Peter's Field" and "Waterloo", in reference to the Battle of Waterloo that had taken place four years earlier. Thus, St Peter's Church gave its name to one of the most prominent violent events in British political history.

Location of St Peter's Church

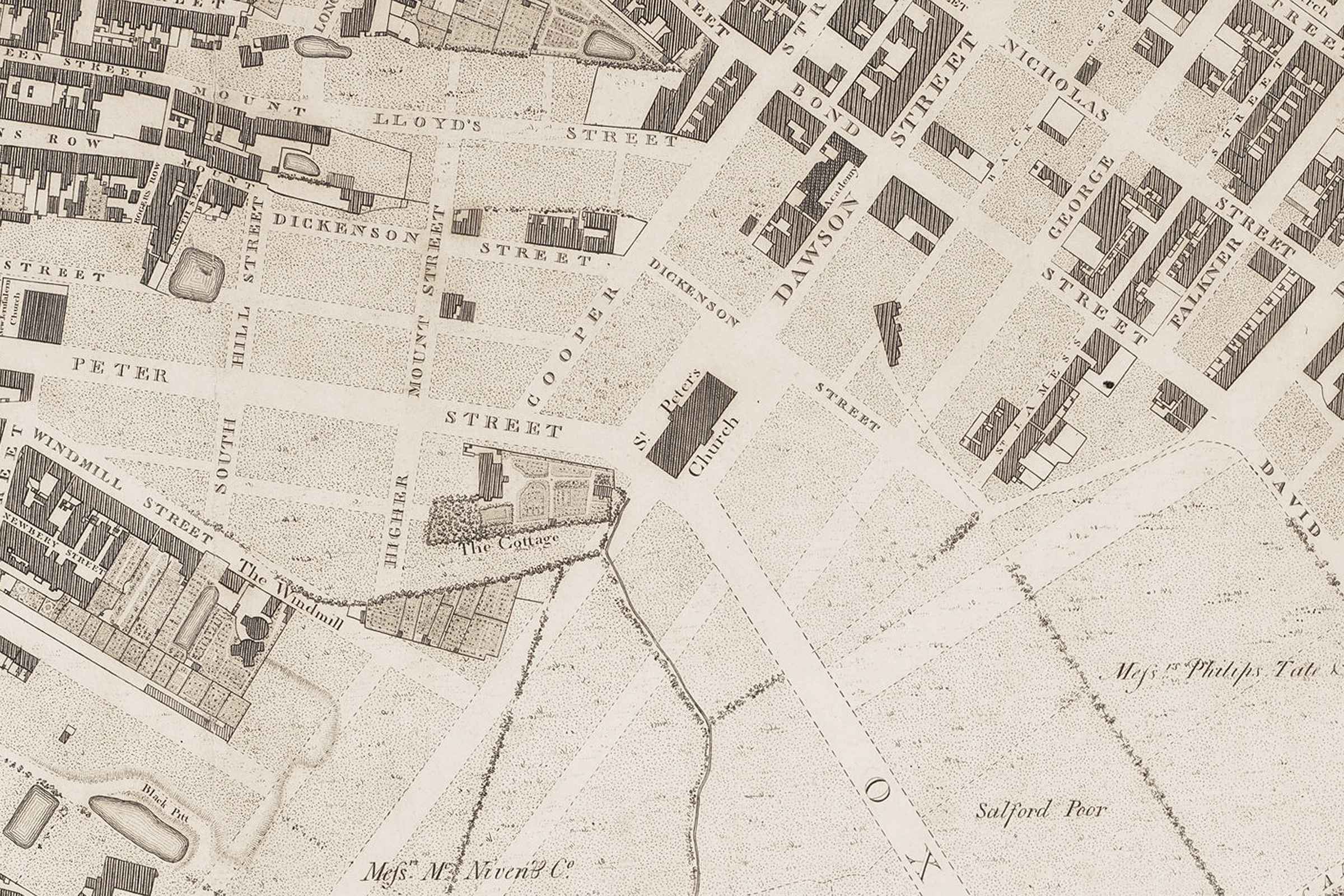
A 1794 map shows the new St Peter's Church bounded by open fields; the planned route of Oxford Street has been laid out

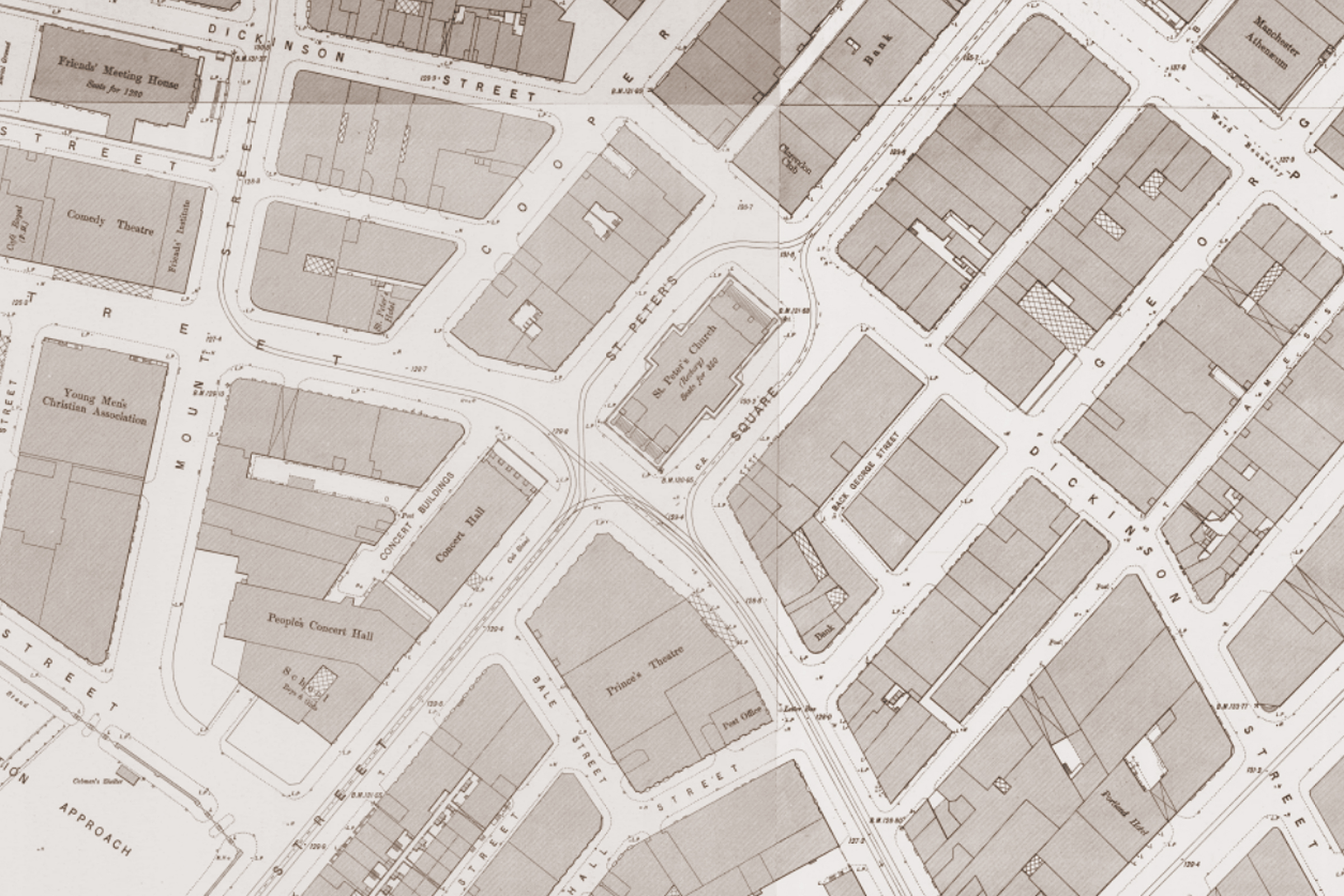
In this 1850 map, the church now sits in St Peter's Square surrounded by buildings and tram lines

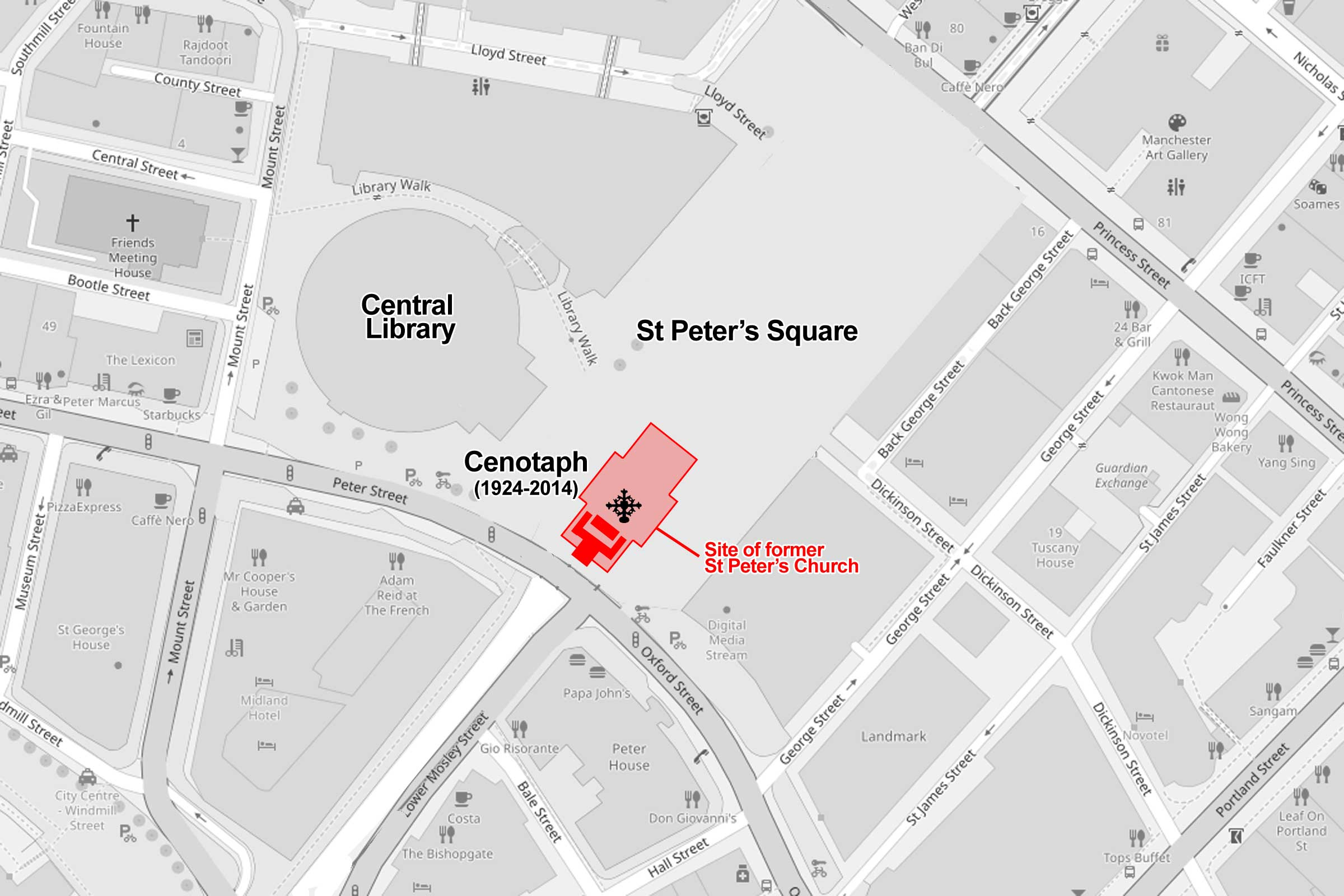
Between 1924 and 2014, the Manchester Cenotaph occupied the site of the demolished church

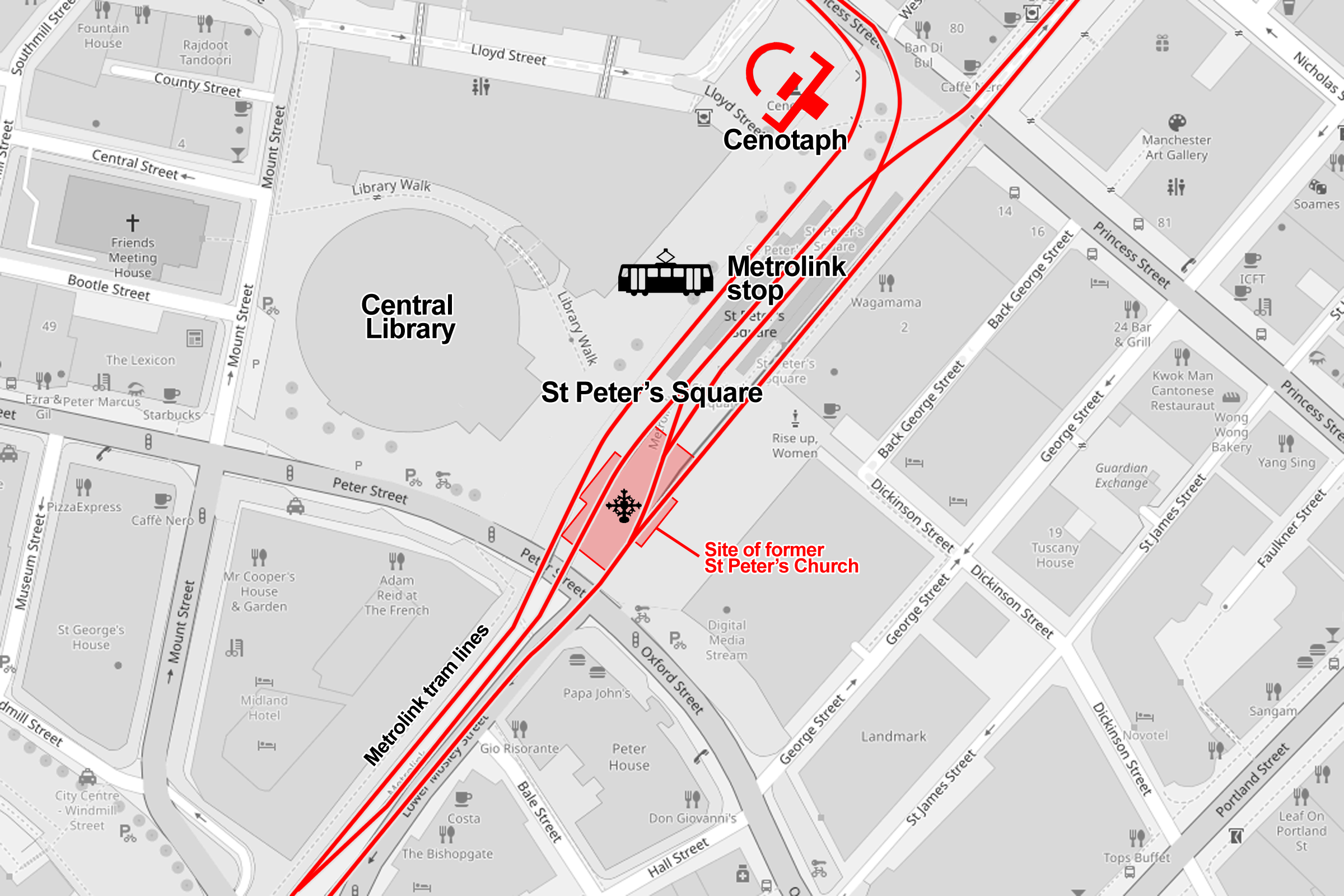
Today, Metrolink tram lines cross over the former site of the church

== Architecture ==
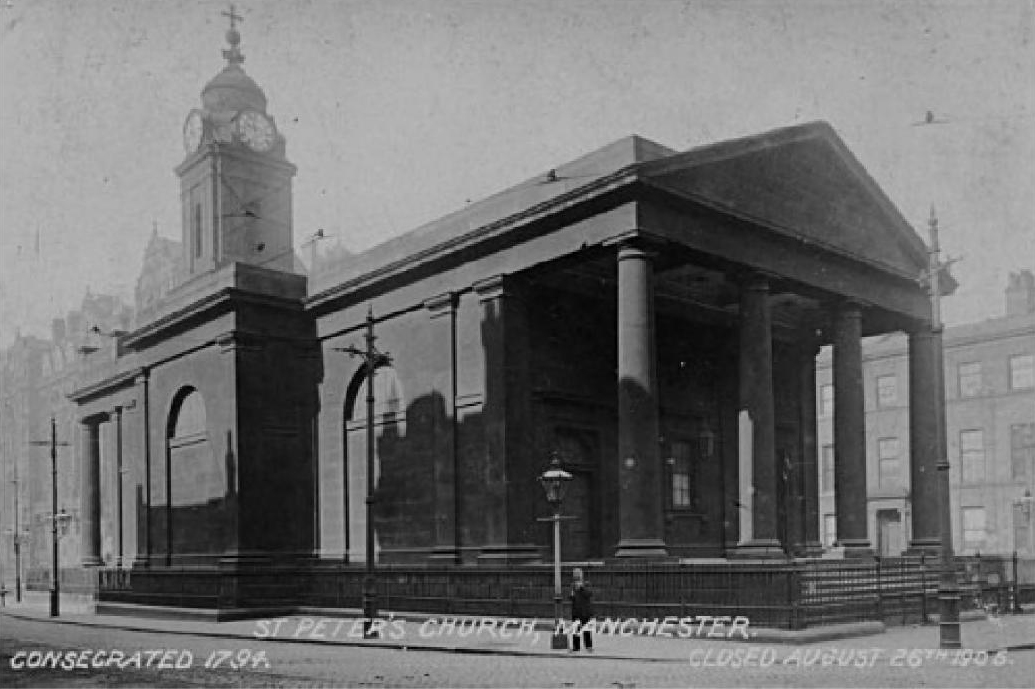
Wayatt's Doric portico on the north-east side of St Peter's Church, facing Mosley Street

The architect James Wyatt was commissioned to build the church. He designed it in a Neoclassical Doric order Greek Revival style, built of Runcorn sandstone. The church was oriented in a northeast-southwest alignment, and at the northern end was a portico supported by Doric columns. When the church opened, it lacked any sort of steeple. Wyatt's original intention was to erect a dome, in keeping with his Doric Order design, but this scheme was rejected in favour of a bell tower, erected in 1824 by the architect Francis Goodwin.

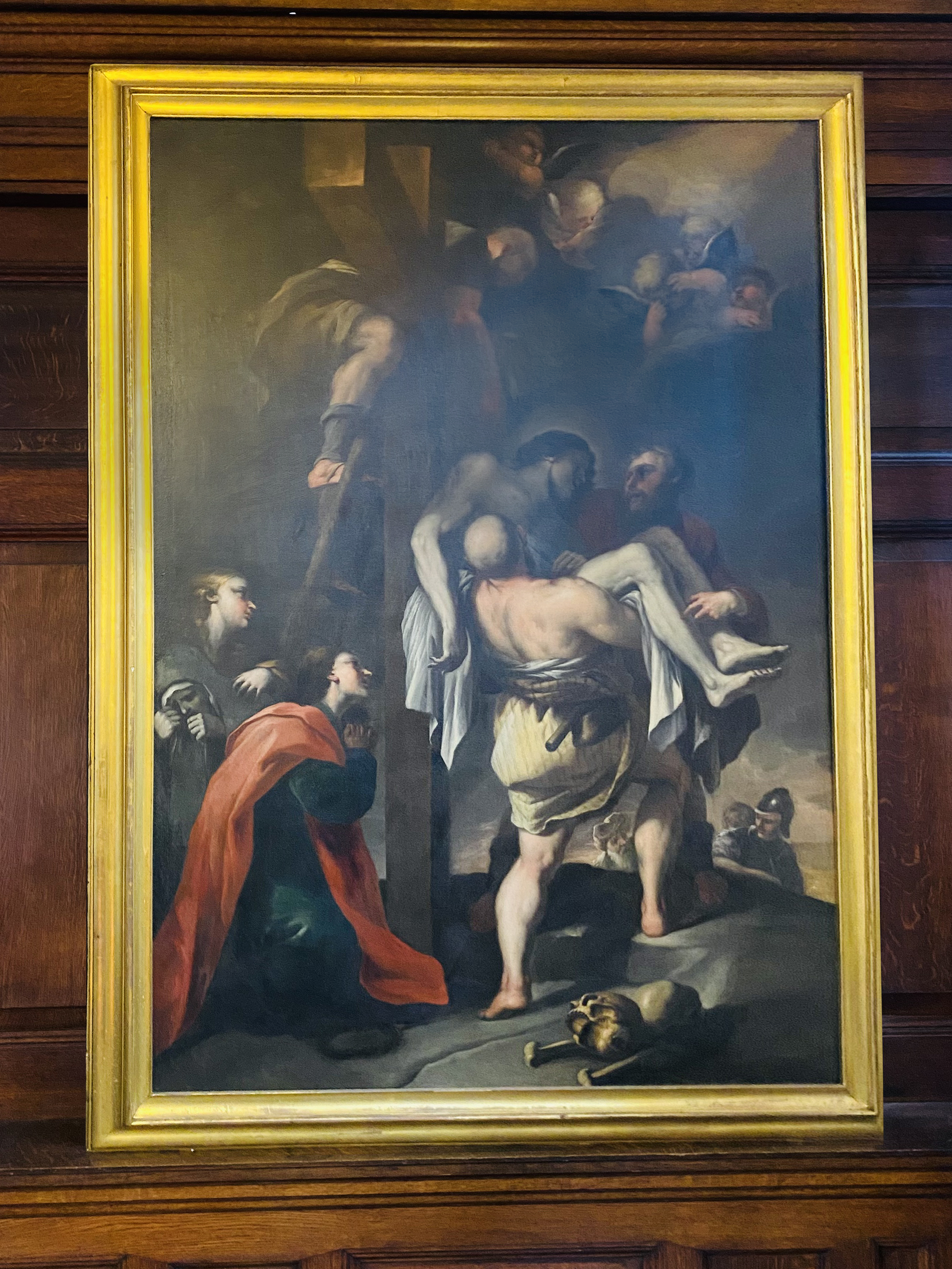
Carracci's Descent from the Cross painting once hung in St Peter's, and is now in St Ann's Church

The interior of the church was said to be dark on account of the high windows. Writing in 1804, the writer Joseph Aston praised Wyatt's design, commenting, "The portico, which terminates the prospect down Dawson Street and Mosley Street, is very fine; and if it was not fixed on too low a site, by which means only one half of the building is seen from Lever Row, it might almost be pronounced faultless. With this drawback it will command admiration whilst a taste for the fine arts is cultivated in this country." Aston described the interior as having a calming acoustic, a mahogany pulpit and crimson cushions in the pews. He also identified a painting hanging above the communion table as a work by the Italian Barqoque artist Annibale Carracci, The Descent from the Cross (c.1580–1600). This painting had been purchased in Italy by one of the churchwardens of St Peter’s.

De Quincey recorded some of the architectural detail of the building. While Wyatt's Grecian style was generally austere, a decorative ceiling mould attracted some controversy at a time when Puritan sentiments rejected adornment in religious buildings. De Quincey recalled the consecration ceremony and the fear of disapproval from the Bishop of Chester:

I remember a little incident which exposed broadly the conflict of feelings inherited by the Church of England from the Puritans of the 17th century. The architecture of the church Grecian: and certainly, the enrichments, inside or outside, were few enough, neither florid nor obtrusive. But in the centre of the ceiling, for the sake of breaking the monotony of so large a blank white surface, there was moulded, in plaster of Paris, a large tablet or shield, charged with a cornucopia of fruits and flowers. And yet, when we were all assembled in the vestry waiting—rector, churchwardens. Architect, and trains of dependents — there arose deep buzz of anxiety, which soon ripened into an articulate expression of fear, that the bishop would think himself bound, like the horrid eikonoclasts of 1643, to issue his decree of utter averruncation to the simple decoration overhead. Fearfully did we all tread the little aisles in the procession of the prelate. Earnestly my lord looked upwards: but finally — were it courtesy, or doubtfulness to hie ground, or approbation —he passed on.

— Thomas De Quincey, 'Confessions of an English Opium-Eater (1821)

Although the church found favour with Bishop Cleaver, a successor, Bishop George Henry Law was outspoken in his criticism of Wyatt's architectural style, the quality of the interior fittings, and the wealthy congregation:

"a more correct ecclesiastical taste would describe the church as very hideous and ill- arranged, so far as worship was the object for which it was erected. The pulpit is of mahogany and formerly had what is called a sounding-board, an arrangement the benefit of which has long been questioned. The church was not meant for the poor, but for those who could pay highly for their seats, and the congregation was gathered from all parts."

— Bishop Law

== Closure and demolition ==
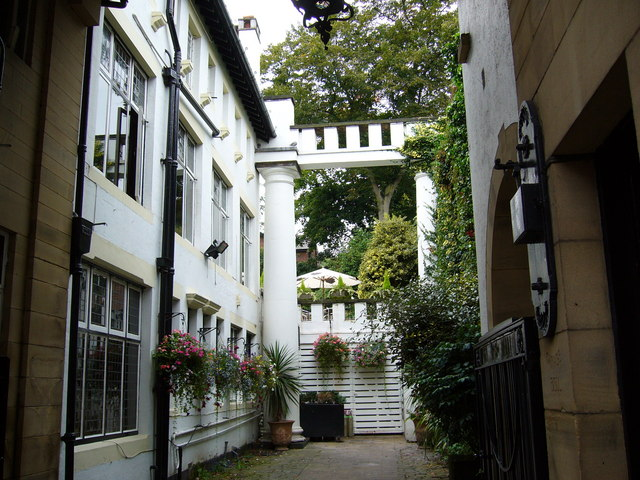
Columns salvaged from St Peter's Church are now in the courtyard of the Gaskell Memorial Tower in Knutsford

By the turn of the 20th century, social change in Manchester – by now a major city – had resulted in a dwindling residential population, as most of the wealthy parishioners had moved out to the fashionable suburbs. The 1901 census showed that the total population of the parish was just 393. The decision was made to close St Peter's Church, and the last service there was held on Sunday 26 August 1906, after 111 years. The land was sold to the Manchester Corporation for £20,000.

Work began in 1907 to pull down the church. During the demolition work, contractors found encased in lead the brass foundation stone along with a number of coins hidden in the external wall beneath the east window of the church. Various items were salvaged from the site to be repurposed elsewhere. Carracci's Descent from the Cross painting was removed and now hangs in nearby St Ann's Church. The large organ was dismantled and removed St Bride's Church, Old Trafford. This church has since been demolished and the organ was put in storage in a warehouse in Lincolnshire; its whereabout are now unknown. A pair of Wyatt's Doric columns were saved from destruction by the designer Richard Harding Watt, who incorporated them into the Gaskell Memorial Tower and King's Coffee House in Knutsford, Cheshire.

After the site had been cleared, the former location of St Peter's Church was marked by a Gothic-style Portland stone cross designed by Temple Moore, mounted on a hexagonal plinth and adorned with carved angels bearing the cross keys emblem of St Peter. Moore's design was subject to criticism at the time, as some expressed the view that a Renaissance style would be more fitting.

In the aftermath of World War I, a war memorial was commissioned and it was decided to locate it in St Peter's Square. It was initially proposed that the St Peter's cross should be removed to make way for the new memorial, but the decision was taken to retain the cross and situate the monument in front of it. The Manchester Cenotaph, designed by Edwin Lutyens, was erected in 1924, and in 1949, the site was laid out with a garden designed by Leonard Cecil Howitt.

The burial vaults of the church were left intact and remain beneath St Peter's Square today. Among the burials is that of a local magistrate Hugh Hornby Birley, noted for his involvement in leading the assault in the Peterloo Massacre in 1819. In 1992, the Manchester Metrolink tram system began operation, and the new line passed through St Peter's Square, close to the site of the former church. When the network was expanded, the square was re-ordered in 2014 to accommodate additional lines and new platforms at St Peter's Square tram stop, During these works, the Cenotaph was re-located on the other side of the square and tram lines were laid over the site of the former church. To protect the underground crypt, concrete slabs were placed over it before the tram tracks were laid. The St Peter’s Cross was restored and re-erected close to its original location above the crypt, in between the Metrolink tracks, and was re-dedicated by the Bishop of Manchester, David Walker, on 15 February 2017.

The church site after 1907

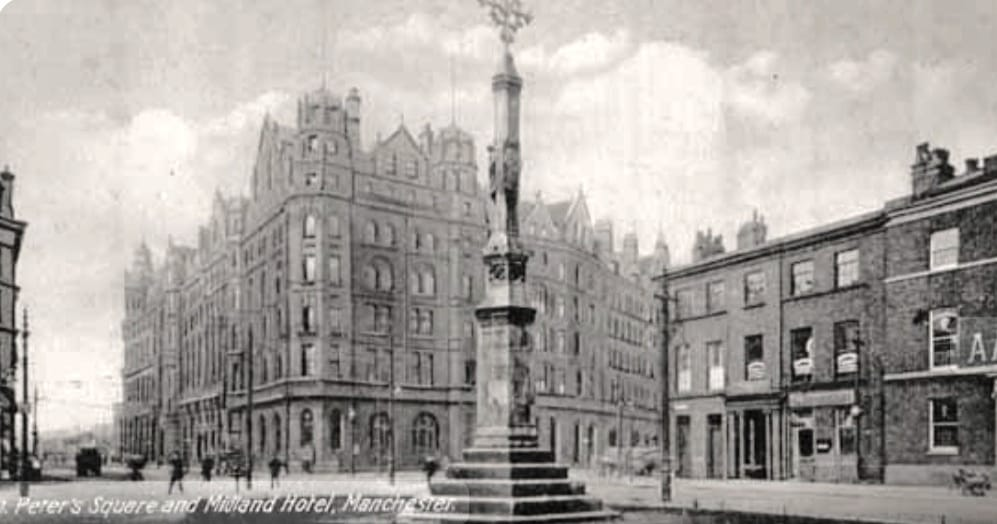
St Peter's Cross by Temple Moore (1907) marks the former site of the church

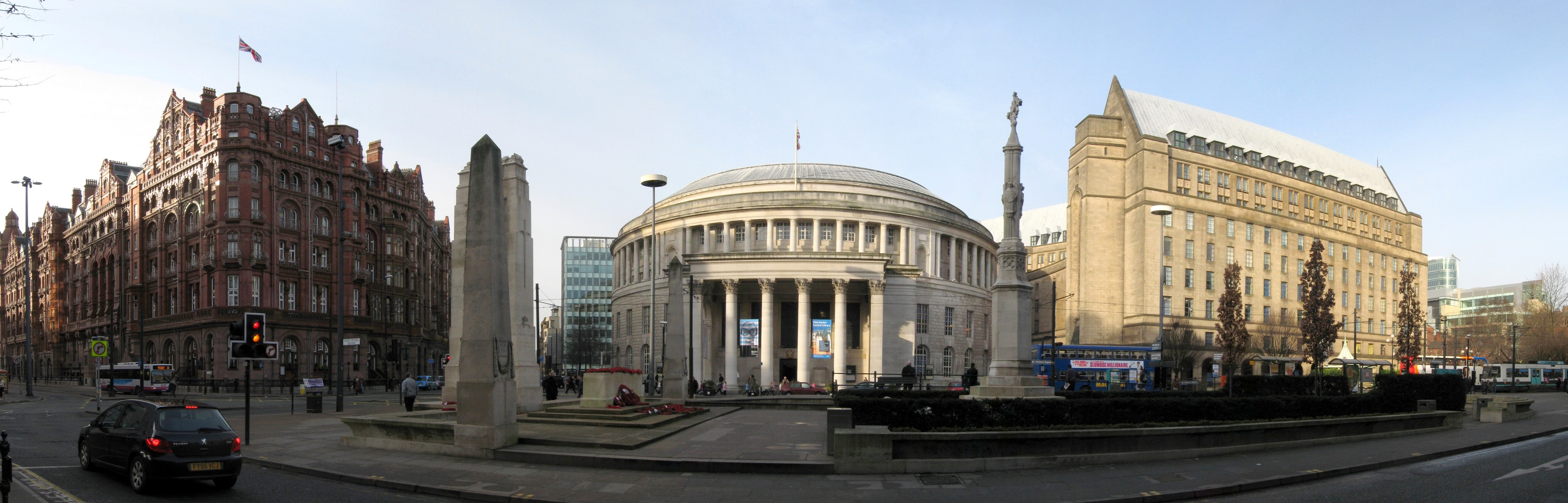
Between 1924 and 2014, the Cenotaph was located on site of the church, next to the St Peter's Cross

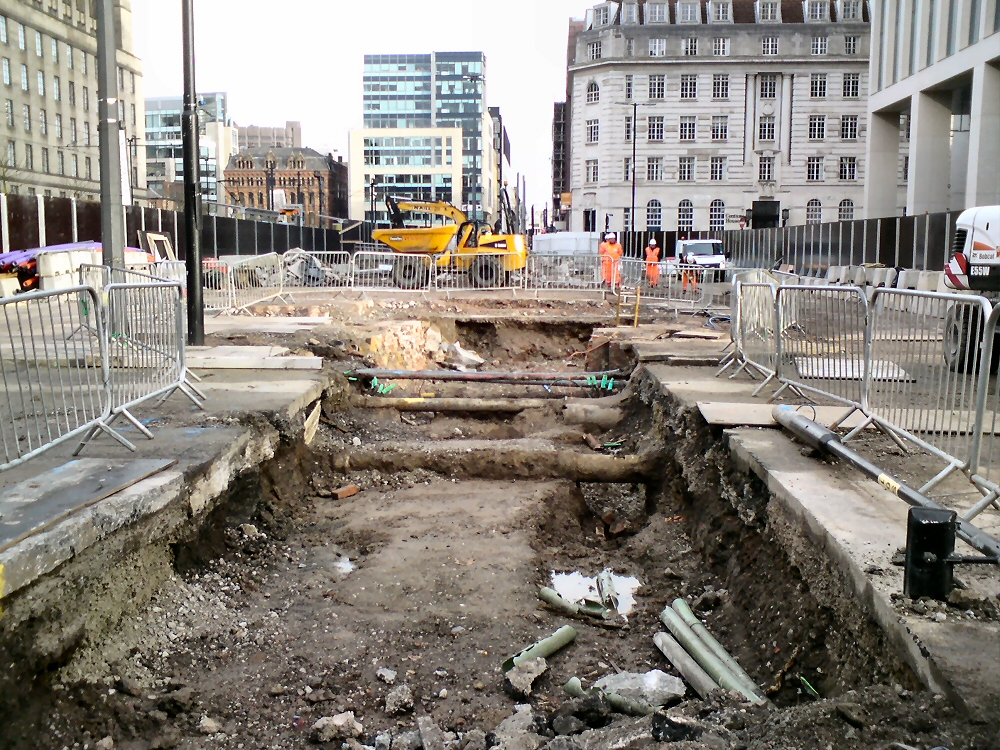
In 2014, the Cenotaph was removed from the church site and relocated

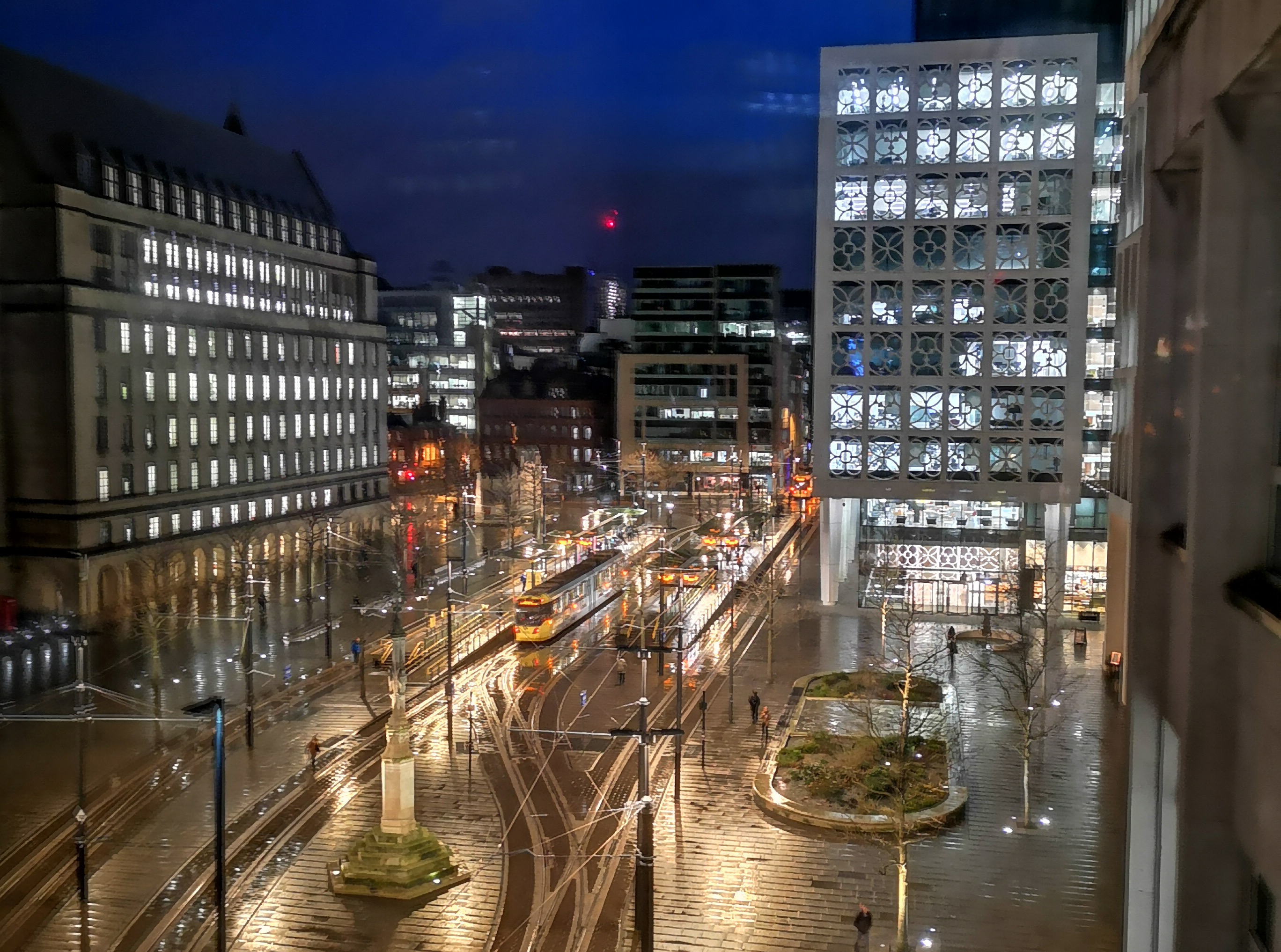
Today, tram tracks cross the site of the church
