= List of works by Richard Harding Watt =

Richard Harding Watt (1842–1913) was an English designer who worked with four professional architects to create large houses and associated buildings in the town of Knutsford, Cheshire.

== Key ==
Grade	Criteria
II*	Particularly important buildings of more than special interest.
II	Buildings of national importance and special interest.

== Major works ==
Name and location	Photograph	Grade	Date	Associated architect	Notes
The Old Croft, Legh Road; 53.2948°N 2.3655°W	—	II	1895	John Brooke; William Longworth	A house designed by Brooke. In 1907 Watt added a tower in association with Watt.
4–8 Drury Lane; 53.3068°N 2.3732°W		II	1898–1904	Harry S. Fairhurst	A row of five cottages.
Mews House and Drury Cottage, Drury Lane; 53.3068°N 2.3728°W		II	1898–1904	Harry S. Fairhurst	Previously the laundry, since converted into two cottages.
Tower House, 9 Drury Lane; 53.3068°N 2.3726°W		II	1898–1904	Harry S. Fairhurst	A five-storey building with a flat roof, formerly surmounted with a gallery and a pinnacle.
10, 11 and 12 Drury Lane; 53.3068°N 2.3723°W		II	1898–1904	Harry S. Fairhurst	Formerly a dye-works, later converted into three cottages.
13 Drury Lane; 53.3068°N 2.3722°W		II	1898–1904	Harry S. Fairhurst	A tower house in four storeys, the upper storey being open. In "severe Germanic style".
Round House, Legh Road; 53.2969°N 2.36557°W		II	c. 1900	—	This consists of a three-storey rectangular block with a round tower at the rear. It was Watt's residence until 1913.
White Howe, Legh Road; 53.2987°N 2.3656°W		II	1901	Walter Aston	A two-storey house, with towers of differing sizes.
Breeze, Legh Road; 53.2984°N 2.3655°W		II	1902	Walter Aston	Originally stables and a gardener's flat, since converted into a house, It is in two storeys with a three-storey tower surmounted by a cupola.
Lake House, Legh Road; 53.2987°N 2.3656°W		II	1902	—	A three-storey house with a round tower with an irregular parapet, and containing an oriel window.
Ruskin Rooms, Drury Lane; 53.3067°N 2.3734°W		II	1902	Harry S. Fairhurst and William Aston	A cubital block with a tower surmounted by a green dome. In three storeys; originally with stabling in the ground floor, a caretaker's flat in the centre, and the reading room at the top, accessed by an outside staircase.
High Morland and Harding House, Legh Road; 53.2981°N 2.3655°W		II	1903	William Longworth	A three storey house, later divided into two houses, with a tower surmounted by an over-hanging pyramidal roof.
High Morland Lodge, Legh Road; 53.2980°N 2.3652°W		II	1903	William Longworth	The lodge to High Morland, with a tower at the rear with a pyramidal roof.
Broad Terraces, Legh Road; 53.2972°N 2.3654°W		II	1905	—	A three-storey house with a square belvedere tower. It contains Italianate and Classical architectural features, including Doric columns.
Gazebo in garden, Round House, Legh Road; 53.2970°N 2.3651°W		II	c. 1905	—	A small circular structure in rendered brick.
Aldwarden Hill, Legh Road; 53.2977°N 2.3654°W	—	II	1906	—	A two-storey house, since divided into two houses. It is surmounted by a belvedere, its design being adapted from that of an Italianate villa.
Chantry Dane, Legh Road; 53.2974°N 2.3654°W		II	1906	—	A three-storey house with a tower, a bellcote and an Ionic porch.
Folly in garden of Broad Terraces, Legh Road; 53.2970°N 2.3656°W		II	c. 1906	—	An open circular structure consisting of consisting of pilasters carrying a conical roof surmounted by a lantern.
The Lodge, Legh Road; 53.2977°N 2.3651°W		II	c. 1906	—	This incorporates the former entrance lodge of the Manchester Royal Infirmary, designed by Richard Lane and re-erected here by Watt. It has the appearance of a Greek Doric temple, and includes a tower with a balustraded parapet.
The Coach House, Legh Road; 53.2979°N 2.3654°W		II	1907	—	Originally the coach house and servants' quarters to Aldwarden Hill, it incorporates a tower.
King's Coffee House and Gaskell Memorial Tower; 53.3041°N 2.3730°W		II*	1907–08	William Longworth	Originally council offices and a coffee house, later a restaurant. The architectural style is eclectic Italianate with Arts and Crafts elements. Its features include two towers, one large, one smaller, a statue of Mrs Gaskell, and a pair of large Doric columns moved from a church in Manchester.
Moorgarth, Legh Road; 53.299431°N 2.365458°W		Unlisted	1898	Harry S Fairhurst	The start of Watt's experimenting. Japanese in style with thin decoration in wood - unrelated to either Watt's or Fairhurst's subsequent work.
Coronation Square; 53.303525°N 2.370844°W		Unlisted	1902		A Moorish tower attached to some cottages, standing out white and connecting with Watt's buildings on Drury Lane and at the Gaskell Memorial Tower.
