= Hugh Hornby Birley =

British Army officer and businessman (1778–1845)

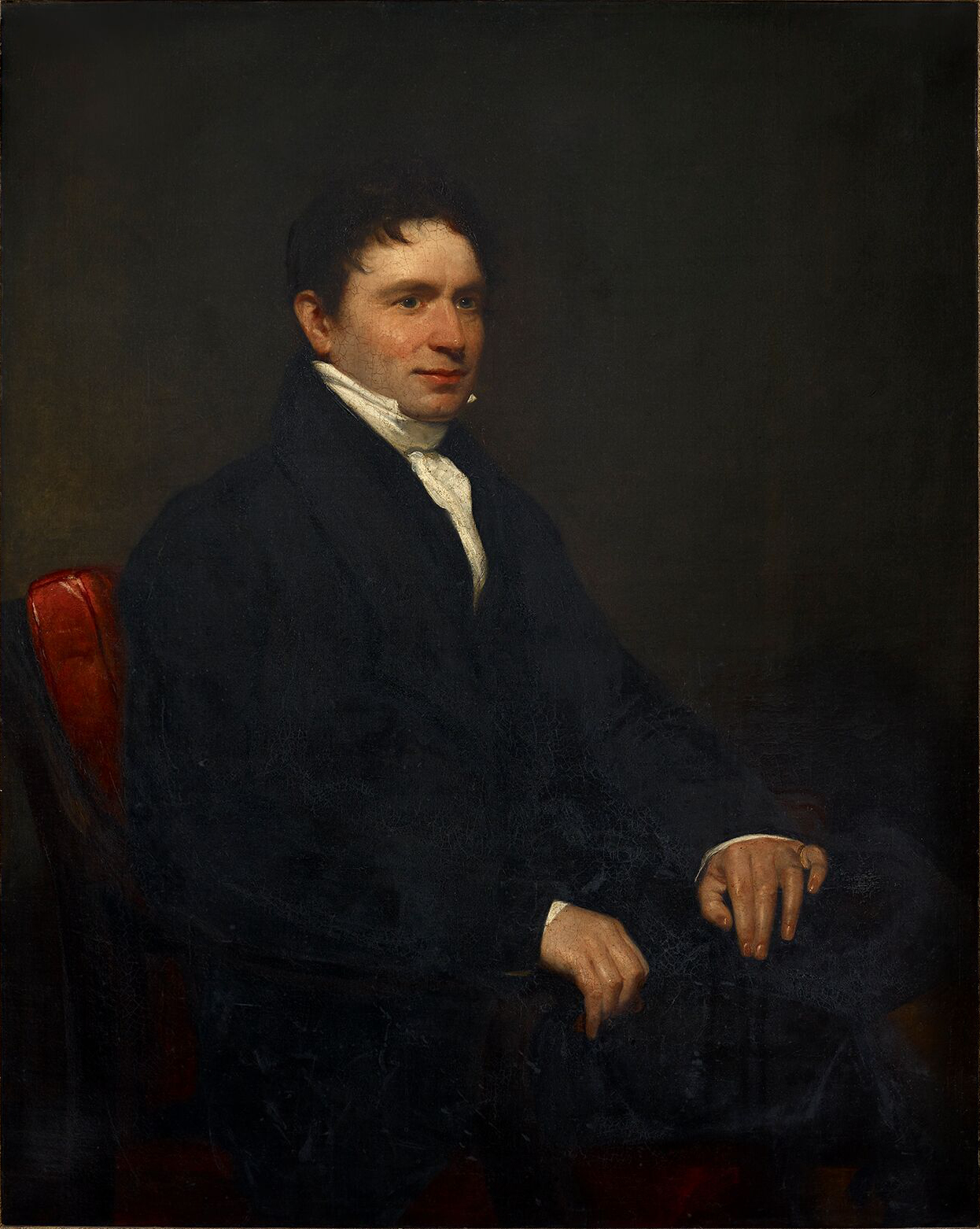
- Portrait of Hugh Hornby Birley (unknown artist, after 1819)
- Born: 10 March 1778; Manchester, England
- Died: 31 July 1845 (aged 67); Manchester, England
- Burial place: St Peter's Church, Manchester; 53°28′40″N 2°14′37″W
- Occupation: Merchant
- Known for: Peterloo Massacre
- Spouse: Cecily Hornby
- Children: 4
- Parent: Richard Birley

Hugh Hornby Birley (10 March 1778 – 31 July 1845) was a leading Manchester millowner and Tory who is reputed to have led the fatal charge of the Manchester and Salford Yeomanry at the Peterloo Massacre on 16 August 1819.

== Early life ==
He was the son of Richard Birley (1743–1812), merchant, who had four sons and four daughters. He was elected to membership of the Manchester Literary and Philosophical Society on 27 April 1804

Hugh's brother, Joseph Birley (1782–1847), was the father of Hugh Birley who served as Member of Parliament for Manchester from 1868 to 1883.

== Career ==
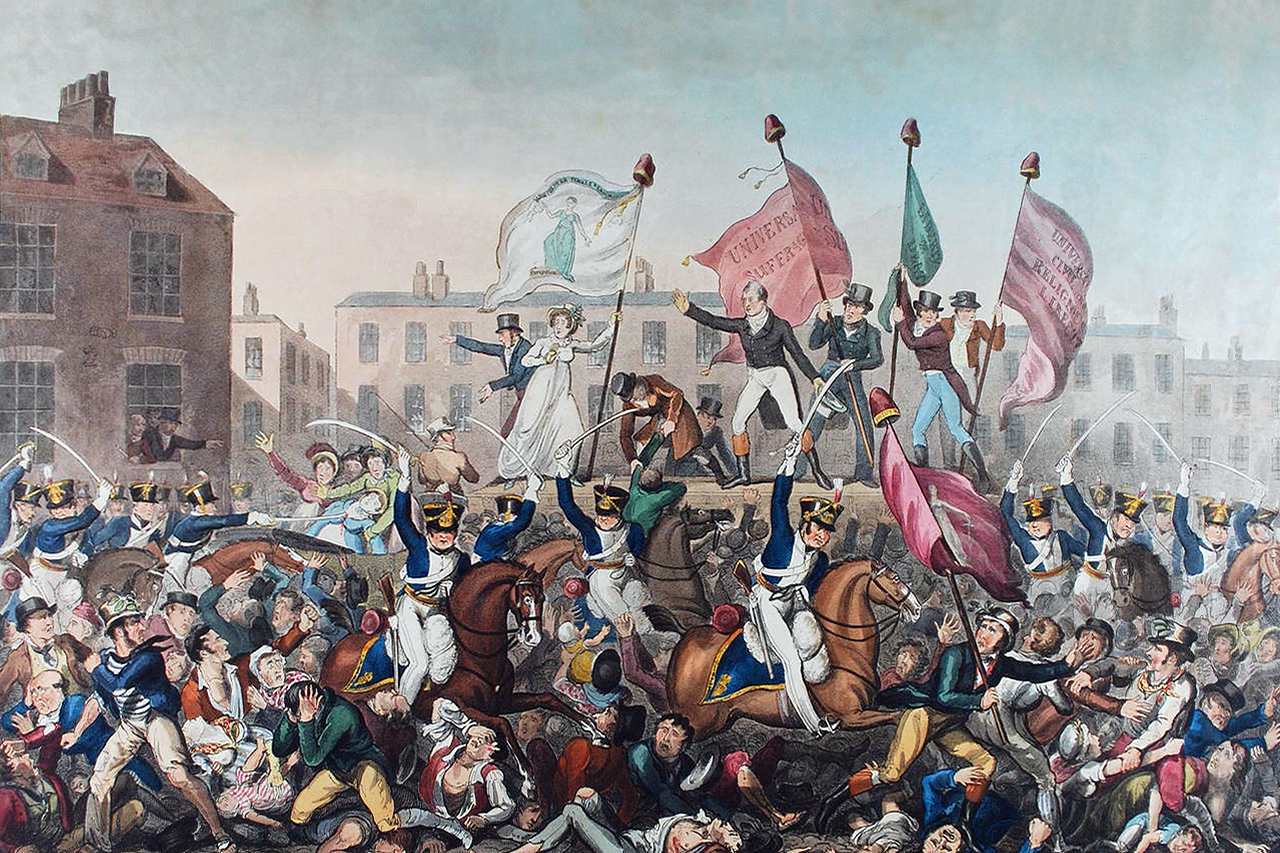
Birley is chiefly remembered for his role in the Peterloo Massacre of 1819 (engraving by Richard Carlile)

In 1814 he commenced the building of the Cambridge Street Cotton Mill in Chorlton-on-Medlock. He was a local magistrate and one of the commanders of the Manchester and Salford Yeomanry responsible for the Peterloo Massacre at St Peter's Field in 1819.

He assisted the Swiss inventor-engineer Johann Georg Bodmer by making space available to him at his Chorlton Mills and was instrumental in founding the Royal Victoria Gallery of Practical Science in 1839. He was associated with the Royal Manchester Institution and a moving force in the establishment of Owens College. He was a director of the Manchester Gas Works and became a business associate of Charles Macintosh with the intention of putting the works' waste products to profitable use in the manufacture of waterproof fabrics.

== Death ==
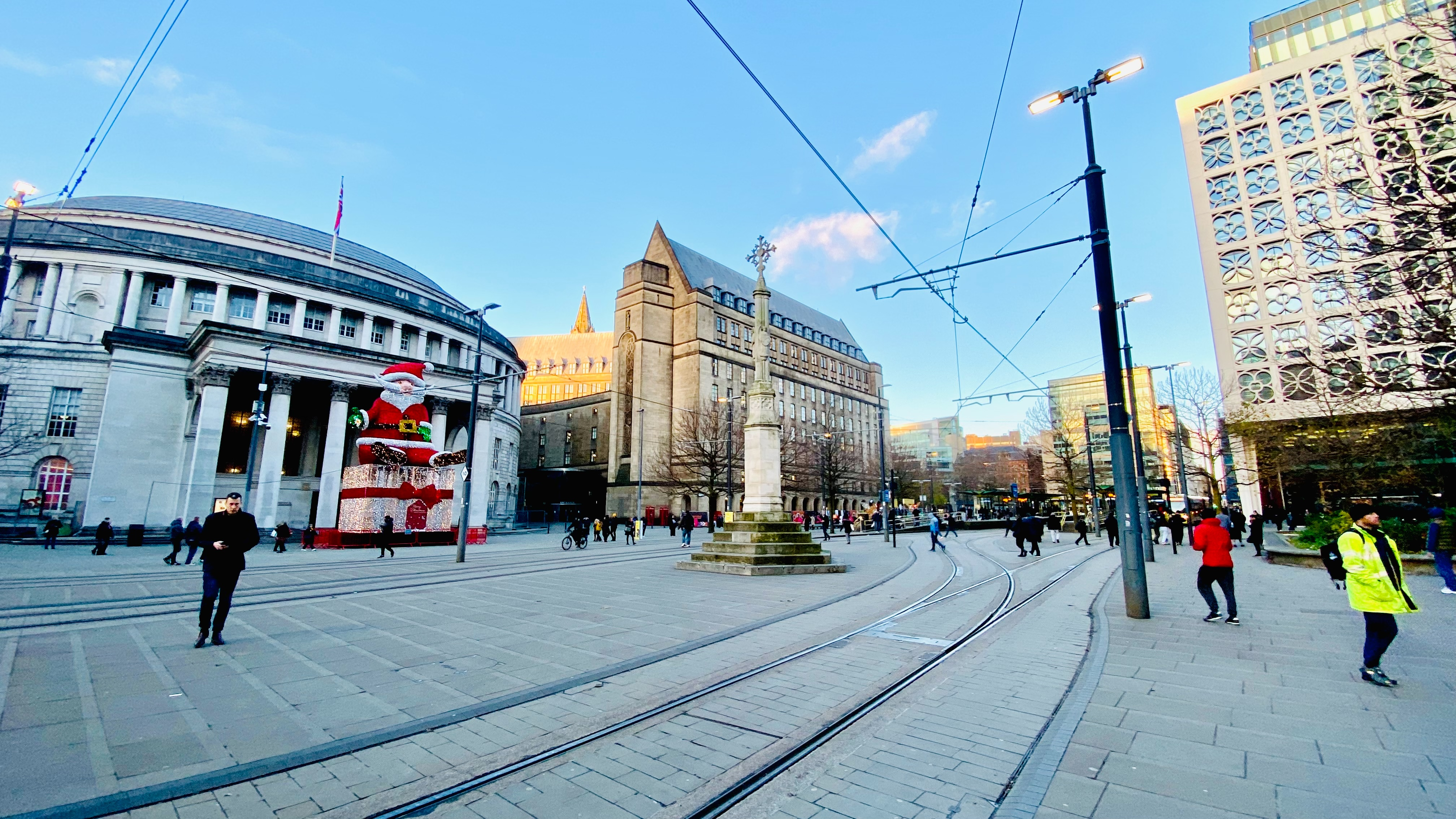
Birley is buried in the family vault under St Peter's Church, which now lies beneath St Peter’s Square, marked by a stone cross

Hugh Hornby Birley died in 1845 and was buried in the family vault in St Peter's Church, Manchester. The church was demolished in 1907 and today the Birley graves, along with other St Peter's burials, lie below street level under the Manchester Metrolink tram lines crossing St Peter's Square. The site of the crypt is marked by a stone cross.

== Family ==
Birley married Cecily Hornby (1797–1843) of Kirkham, with whom he had four sons, including:

- Joseph Hornby Birley (1827–1881)

=== Descendants ===
His nephew was Hugh Birley (1817–1883), a businessman and Conservative politician, and his great-grandson was Oswald Birley (1880–1952), the portrait painter and royal portraitist prominent in the early part of the 20th century.
