= Joseph Birley =

English cricketer (1827–1881)

Personal information
- Full name: Joseph Hornby Birley
- Born: 12 March 1827; Manchester, Lancashire, England
- Died: 5 October 1881 (aged 54); Newton-le-Willows, Lancashire, England
- Batting: Unknown

Career statistics
Competition	First-class
Matches	1
Runs scored	15
Batting average	7.50
100s/50s	–/–
Top score	14
Catches/stumpings	1/–
- Source: Cricinfo, 30 December 2019

Joseph Hornby Birley JP (12 March 1827 – 5 October 1881) was an English first-class cricketer.

The son of Hugh Hornby Birley and Cicely Hornby, he was born at Manchester in March 1827. He was educated at Winchester College, after which he became a merchant at Newton-le-Willows, Lancashire. He made a single appearance in first-class cricket for Manchester against Sheffield at Hyde Park in 1852. Batting twice in the match, he was dismissed for a single run in Manchester's first-innings by Henry Wright, while in their second-innings he was run out for 14. Birley later became a justice of the peace and he died at Newton-le-Willows in October 1881.
