= Manchester Cenotaph =

World War I memorial

The Cenotaph
- United Kingdom
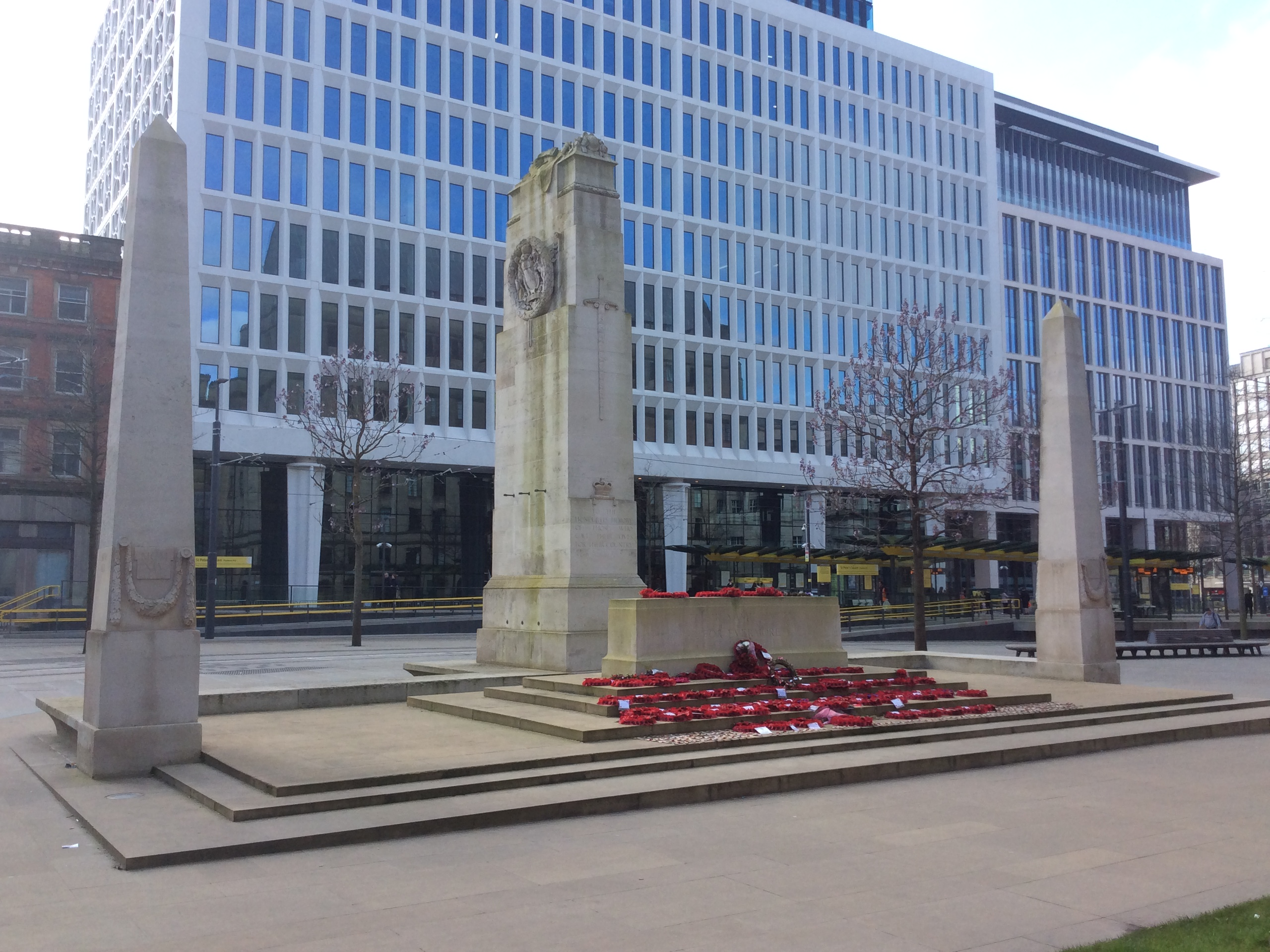
- Manchester Cenotaph in 2017, in its new location near the town hall; looking south
- For casualties of the First World War (modified to include the Second World War and the Korean War)
- Unveiled: 12 July 1924; 101 years ago
- Location: 53°28′43″N 2°14′34″W; St Peter's Square, Manchester, England
- Designed by: Edwin Lutyens

Listed Building – Grade II*
- Official name: Manchester War Memorial
- Designated: 3 September 1974
- Reference no.: 1270697

Manchester Cenotaph is a war memorial in St Peter's Square, Manchester, England. Manchester was late in commissioning a First World War memorial compared with most British towns and cities; the city council did not convene a war memorial committee until 1922. The committee quickly achieved its target of raising £10,000 but finding a suitable location for the monument proved controversial. The preferred site in Albert Square would have required the removal and relocation of other statues and monuments, and was opposed by the city's artistic bodies. The next choice was Piccadilly Gardens, an area already identified for a possible art gallery and library; but in the interests of speedier delivery, the memorial committee settled on St Peter's Square. The area within the square had been purchased by the City Council in 1906, having been the site of the former St Peter's Church; whose sealed burial crypts remained with burials untouched and marked above ground by a memorial stone cross. Negotiations to remove these stalled so the construction of the cenotaph proceeded with the cross and burials in situ.

Having picked a site, it was originally proposed to choose an architect by open competition, but the memorial committee was criticised in the local press when it reserved the right to overrule the judgement of the independent assessor. A sub-committee therefore approached Sir Edwin Lutyens directly, who produced, in a matter of weeks, a variation of his design for the Cenotaph in London. The memorial consists of a central cenotaph and a Stone of Remembrance flanked by twin obelisks, all features characteristic of Lutyens' works. Raised steps on either side of the Stone of Remembrance provided east-facing tribunes for the colour party in memorial parades. The cenotaph is topped by an effigy of a fallen soldier and decorated with relief carvings of the imperial crown, Manchester's coat of arms and inscriptions commemorating the dead. The structures, based on classical architecture, use abstract, ecumenical shapes rather than overt religious symbolism. In submitting the design, Lutyens stated that he envisaged the crypts and cross as remaining in place; as the cenotaph could stand on the foundations of the former church tower and the cross would serve to "consecrate the site", while there would be no explicit religious symbolism on the cenotaph itself.

The memorial was unveiled on 12 July 1924 by the Earl of Derby, assisted by Mrs Bingle, a local resident whose three sons had died in the war. It cost £6,940 and the remaining funds were used to provide hospital beds.

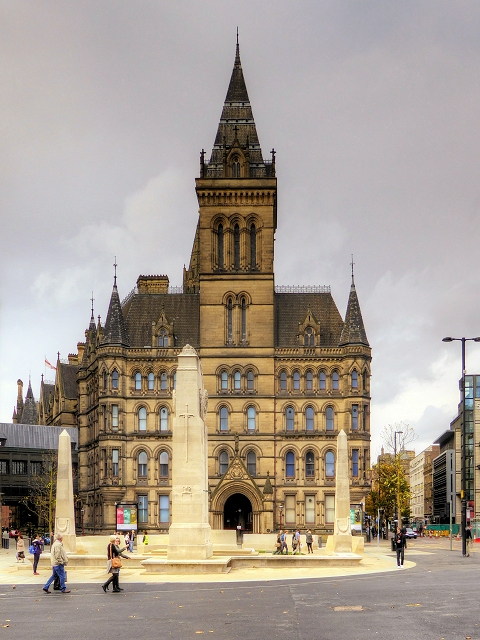
The Cenotaph on its present site; looking northwest

In 2014, Manchester City Council dismantled the memorial and reconstructed it at the northeast corner of St Peter's Square next to Manchester Town Hall to make room for the expanded Metrolink tram network. It is a grade II* listed structure and in 2015, Historic England recognised Manchester Cenotaph as part of a national collection of Lutyens' war memorials.

== Background ==
In the aftermath of the First World War and its unprecedented casualties, thousands of war memorials were built across Britain. Virtually every village, town, or city erected some form of memorial to commemorate their dead. During the war, only London provided more recruits to the British Army than Manchester. The Manchester Regiment and the Lancashire Fusiliers, which were largely recruited from the city and towns to the north, were swollen by pals battalions drawn from local employers, social groups, and neighbourhoods. By the end of the war, over 13,000 men of the Manchester Regiment, including more than 4,000 from the pals battalions and 13,600 Lancashire Fusiliers, had been killed. An estimated 22,000 Mancunians died and 55,000 were wounded.

== Commissioning ==
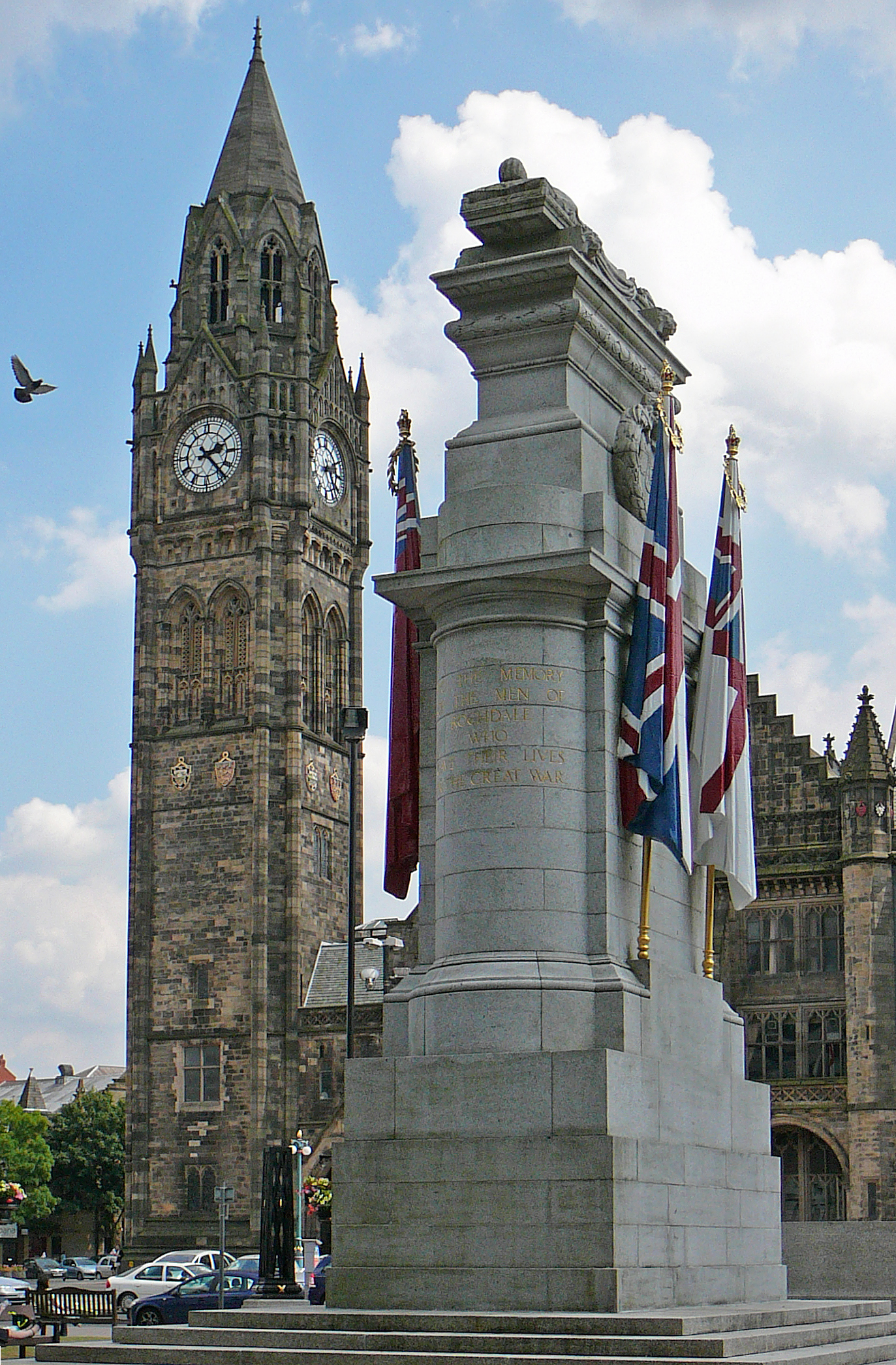
The Rochdale Cenotaph, also by Lutyens, with the tower of Rochdale Town Hall in the background

Many towns and cities began to erect war memorials after the armistice, but Manchester did not get underway until 1922. As a result of pressure from the local branch of the British Legion, the city council convened a war memorial committee of 12 persons, chaired by the mayor and consisting of "Aldermen and Councillors [and] representative men connected with different aspects of Manchester business, with the military forces and other sections of Manchester life", to explore options for commemoration. The committee limited the budget to £10,000 and very rapidly raised this sum; donors being assured that local firms would benefit from the construction and resulting employment. Nonetheless, the letters pages of local newspapers featured several missives from ex-servicemen who felt that the cenotaph was a waste of money and that the funds would be better spent on the survivors and war widows, many of whom faced extreme hardship as a result of high levels of unemployment in the aftermath of the war. For a civic memorial to the Great War, £10,000 was relatively modest sum; the counterpart public appeal in Rochdale had raised nearly £30,000, and the resulting Rochdale Cenotaph, then just completed, had cost £12,611. The proprietor of the Daily Dispatch newspaper, Edward Hulton, offered to cover the entire cost of the Manchester memorial, but the committee declined, feeling that the funding should come from the people and city of Manchester. Subsequently, the committee resisted all suggestions that the memorial budget might be increased, or that the list of donors might be extended. Constitutionally, the memorial committee was a committee of the City Council, but acted throughout as having independent discretion and funds.

Three potential sites were considered for the memorial: Albert Square, Piccadilly Gardens and St Peter's Square; St Ann's Square being ruled out as already containing the civic monument to the Boer War. With the support of the British Legion, Albert Square emerged as the favourite. The site proved controversial as the Manchester Society of Architects and Manchester Art Foundation led objections to the removal and relocation of statues in the square, which would have been required to create a suitable space for the war memorial. King George V had consented to the relocation of the memorial to his German grandfather, Prince Albert, but objections persisted and the city architect estimated the cost of relocating the statues at £8,400. The City Council rejected Albert Square in March 1923, and voted by 71 votes to 30 in favour of Piccadilly Gardens as the site for the monument. The City was already considering building an art gallery at Piccadilly on the space left after the old Manchester Royal Infirmary had been demolished, albeit that this was currently filled by temporary huts housing the books from Manchester Central Library. Siting the memorial on this land was welcomed by the Art Gallery Committee, who proceeded to commission designs for a memorial in the form of a 'Hall of Memory'; but would be contingent on also funding a new library. As nothing was yet decided on these wider schemes, any plans for the area would have delayed the war memorial project further and so in May 1923 the memorial committee, acting on its own initiative, disregarded the vote of the Council and switched attention to St Peter's Square. The square was itself a controversial choice; both because it was then much the smallest of the three options, and also due to its being the location of the former St Peter's church, demolished in 1907. The statutory trustees appointed to administer the funds paid over by the city council for the deconsecrated site of the church had been required by the Manchester Churches Act 1906 (6 Edw. 7. c. lxix) to erect and maintain a memorial cross on the site, as well as to protect the bodies of the dead still interred in vaults underneath; and they objected to the removal of both. The dispute was only partially resolved, as although the trustees consented to the construction of the cenotaph they refused to allow the removal of the cross while the burials remained in place. Accordingly, discussions proceeded with the Manchester diocese on the basis that the burials would need to be removed individually and reburied on separate plots in one of the City cemeteries; the cross being relocated to the grounds of Manchester Cathedral. However, this would add considerable time and cost to the memorial project.

Lutyens' Whitehall cenotaph in London

More controversy surrounded the choice of architect. The Manchester Art Federation and other bodies petitioned the city council to hold an open competition, to which the Council agreed. The war memorial committee appointed Percy Worthington, a local architect, as the assessor for the competition but attracted severe criticism in the local press when it reserved to itself the right to veto Worthington's choice. After further debate, a subcommittee approached Sir Edwin Lutyens, and the competition collapsed. Conveniently, Lutyens assured the committee in August 1923 that his design could accommodate the cross and crypts remaining in place, while clearly distinct; and so this whole issue was deferred until after the cenotaph had been completed and dedicated.

=== Architect ===
Lutyens, described by Historic England as "the leading English architect of his generation", was amongst the most prominent designers of war memorials in Britain. Before the war, he had established his reputation designing country houses for wealthy patrons but the war had a profound effect on him and from 1917 onwards he dedicated much of his time to memorialising the casualties. The Stone of Remembrance that he designed in 1917 appears in all large Imperial War Graves Commission (IWGC) cemeteries and in several of his civic memorials, including Manchester's. His Cenotaph on Whitehall in London became the focus for national Remembrance Sunday commemorations and one of the most influential designs for war memorials in Britain. Manchester's cenotaph, a close replica, is one of seven in England based on it.

Lutyens designed the Thiepval Memorial to the Missing of the Somme, the largest British war memorial in the world, for the IWGC in 1928. Around the same time he designed his only other commission in Manchester, the Midland Bank at 100 King Street.

== Design ==
Manchester's war memorial is a cenotaph, flanked by twin obelisks, and a Stone of Remembrance, all in Portland stone on a raised coved platform. The memorial covers an area of approximately 93 feet (28 metres) by 53 feet (16 metres). The cenotaph is 32 feet (9.8 metres) high made from 160 long tons (160,000 kilograms) of Portland stone. The pylon is surmounted by a sculpture of an unknown soldier, partially covered by his greatcoat, lying on a catafalque. The pylon rises from the base in diminishing stages, narrowing as it rises. Below the catafalque, on the front and rear, are moulded swords and imperial crowns, and to the sides are Manchester's coat of arms surrounded by laurel wreaths. The cenotaph bears inscriptions below the coat of arms: "TO THE HONOURED MEMORY OF THOSE WHO GAVE THEIR LIVES FOR THEIR COUNTRY" (on the north-west side) and "O LORD GOD OF OUR FATHERS KEEP THIS/FOREVER IN THE IMAGINATION OF THE THOUGHTS OF THE HEART OF THY PEOPLE" (on the south east). Identical, 23-foot (7-metre) high obelisks stand either side of the cenotaph and the Stone of Remembrance is set in front. The stone, a monolith in the shape of an altar, is 12 feet (3.7 metres) long and subtly, aesthetically curved; it is devoid of decoration and inscribed, "THEIR NAME LIVETH FOR EVERMORE".

Lutyens' design, with flanking objects, recumbent figure and a Stone of Remembrance set in front of the cenotaph, is reminiscent of his earlier cenotaph in Southampton. While other First World War memorials feature sculpture or overt religious symbolism, Manchester's, like many of his memorials, uses abstract and ecumenical shapes inspired by classical architecture. Its effigy of the unknown soldier raised high on the pylon rather than at eye level is reminiscent of ancient tower tombs. The sculpture's position high above eye level gives the soldier anonymity, complementing the abstract shapes of the structures and allowing an onlooker to project an image of their own choosing onto it, and distances the viewer from the fact of the death and focuses on an idealised sense of self-sacrifice.

The Pevsner City Guide to Manchester described the cenotaph as one of the few impressive war memorials in Manchester but, in its original site at western end of St Peter's Square, lamented its cluttered setting and proximity to the overhead powerlines of the Metrolink tram system. The cenotaph, obelisks, and stone are features typical of Lutyens' war memorial work, although Manchester's is one of only two with flanking obelisks—Northampton's has a similar pair of obelisks flanking a Stone of Remembrance.

Views showing the constituent parts of the memorial

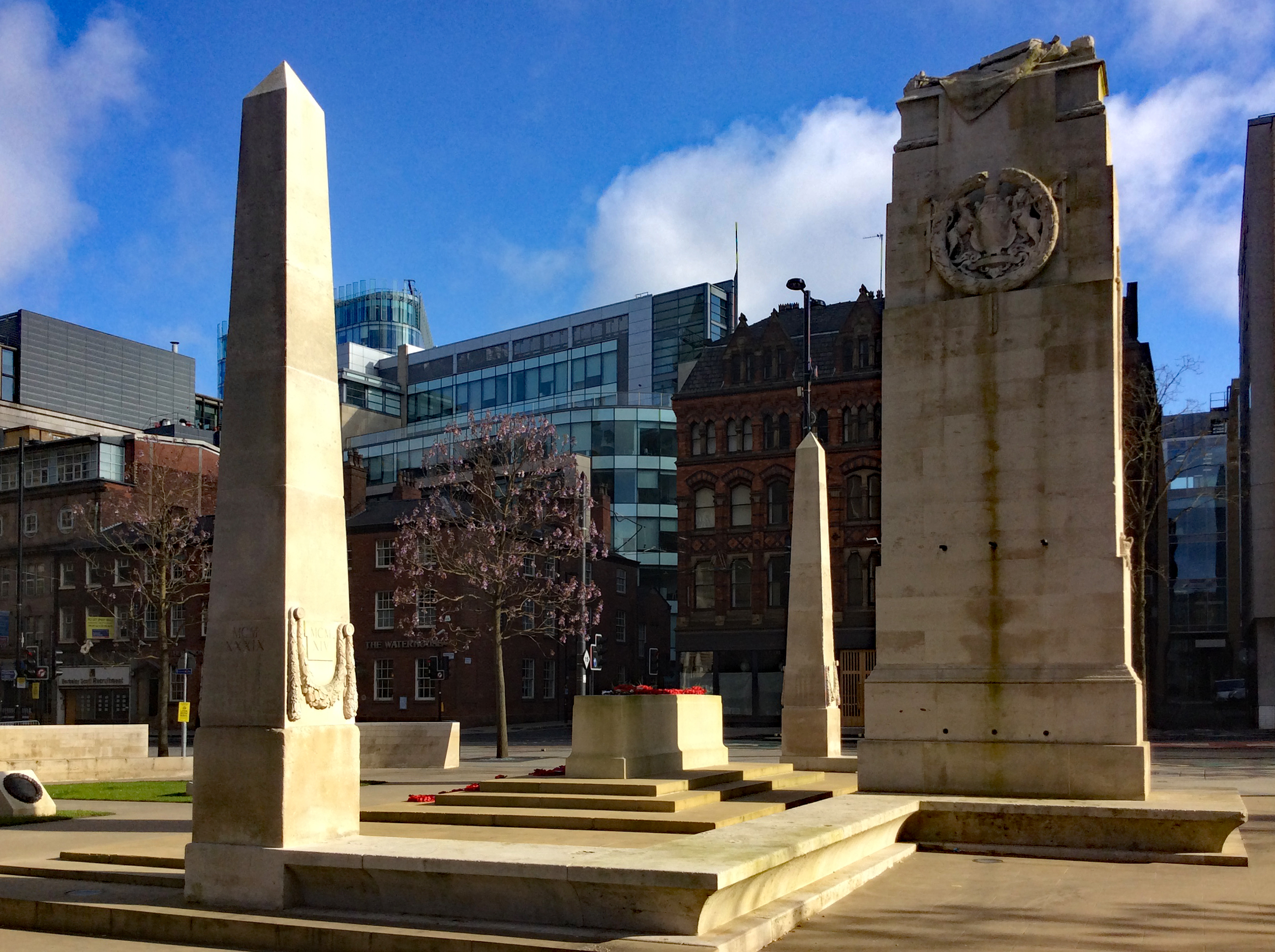
Right obelisk

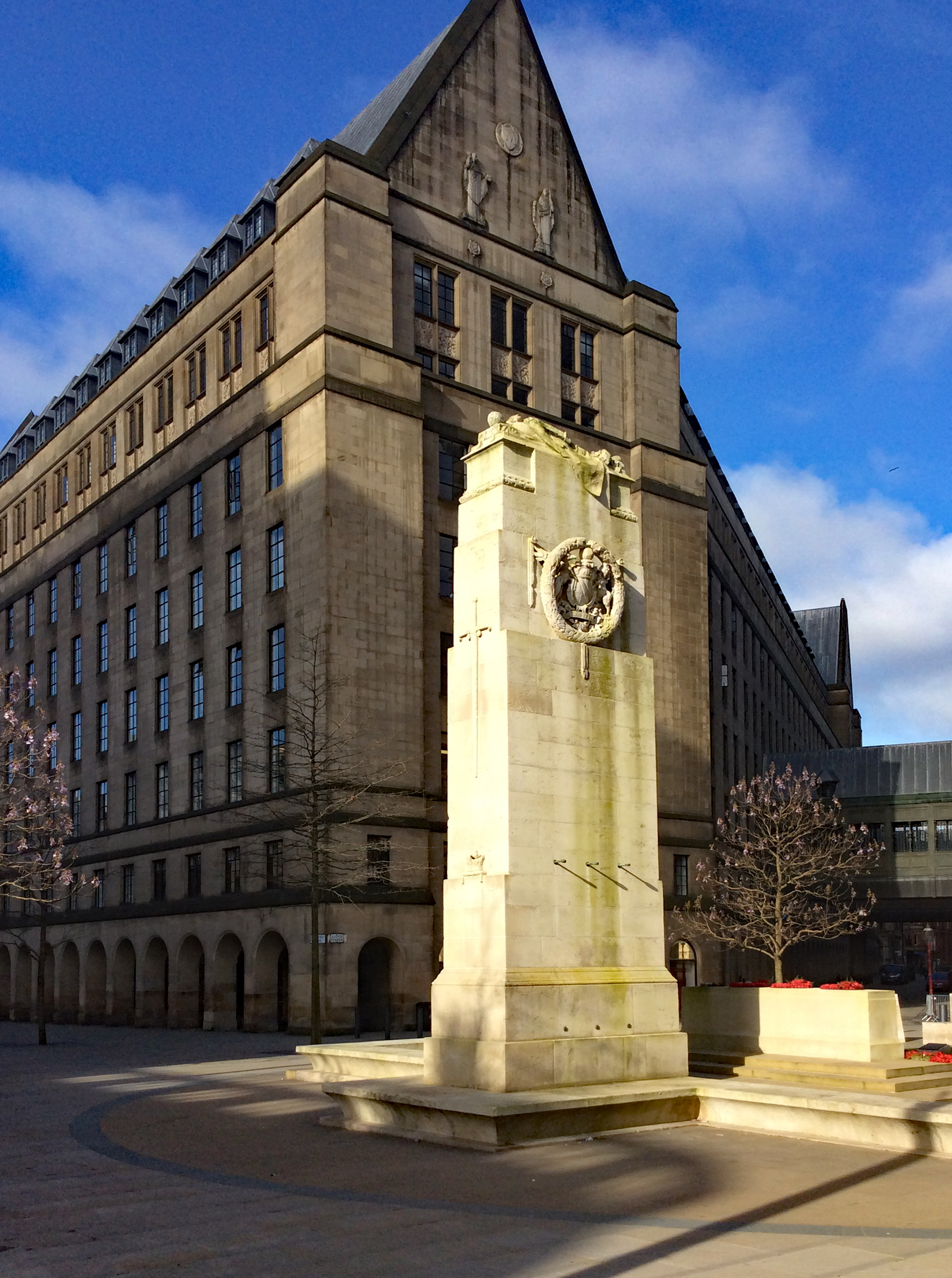
Cenotaph

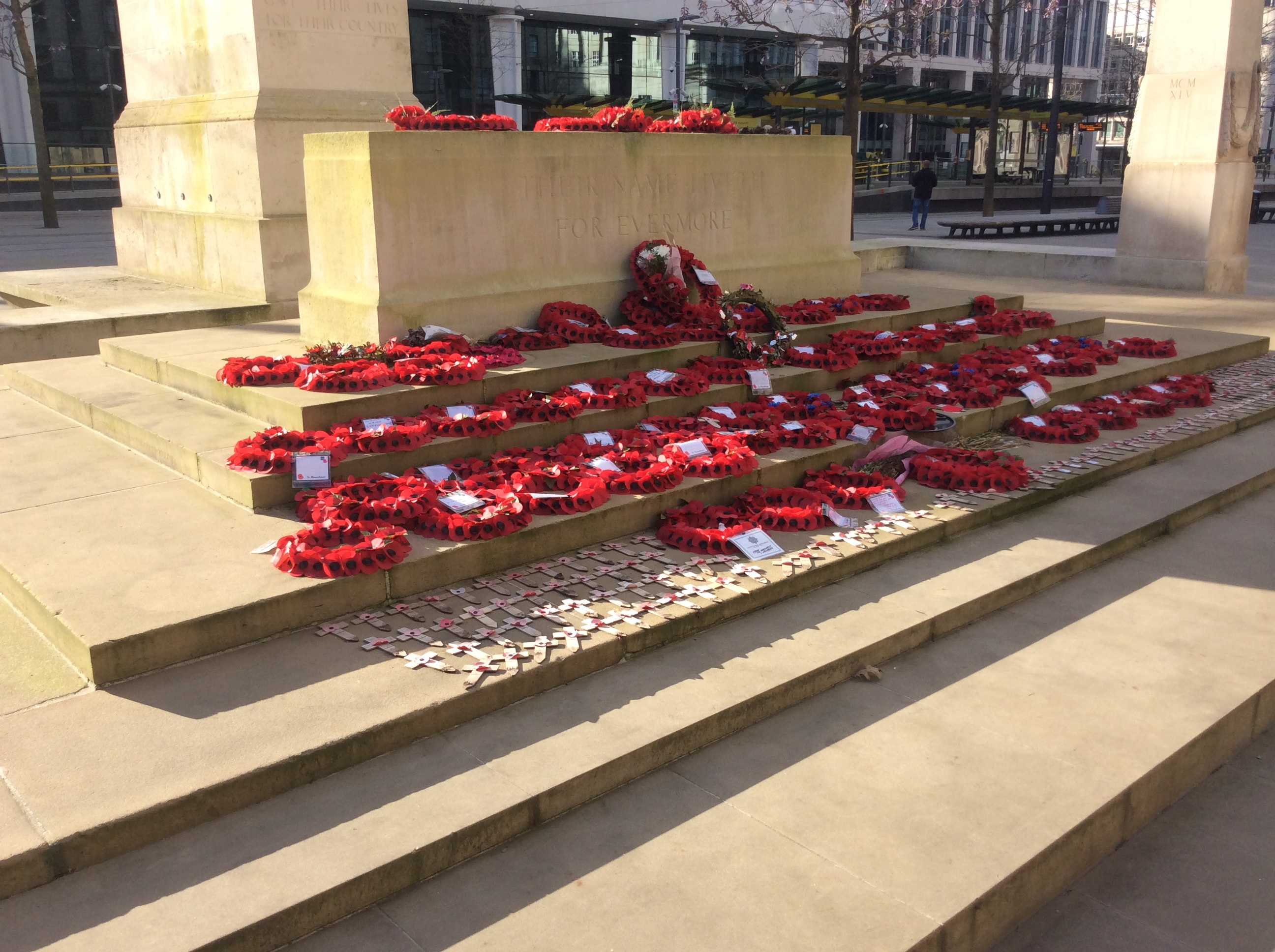
Stone of Remembrance

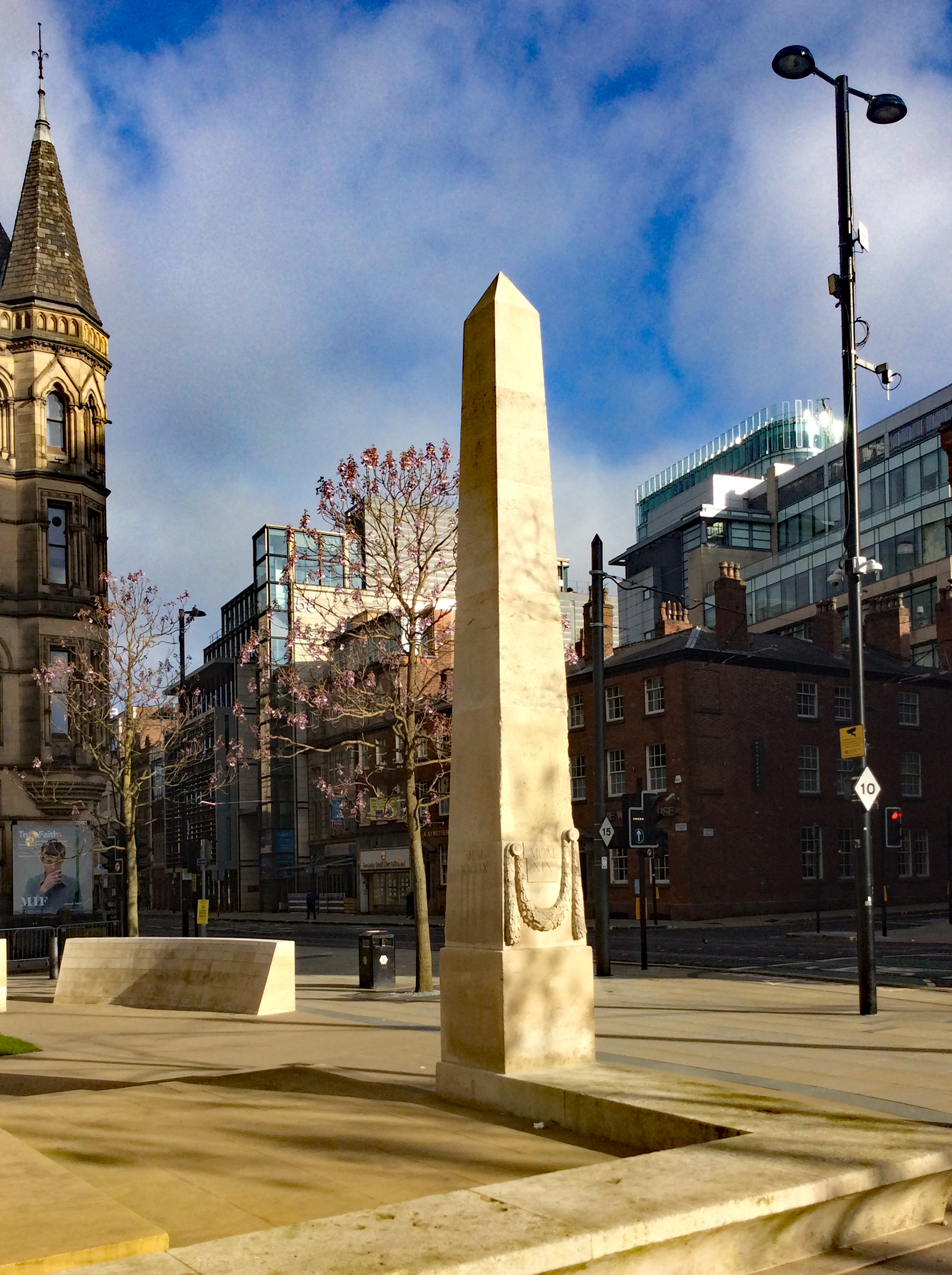
Left obelisk

== History ==
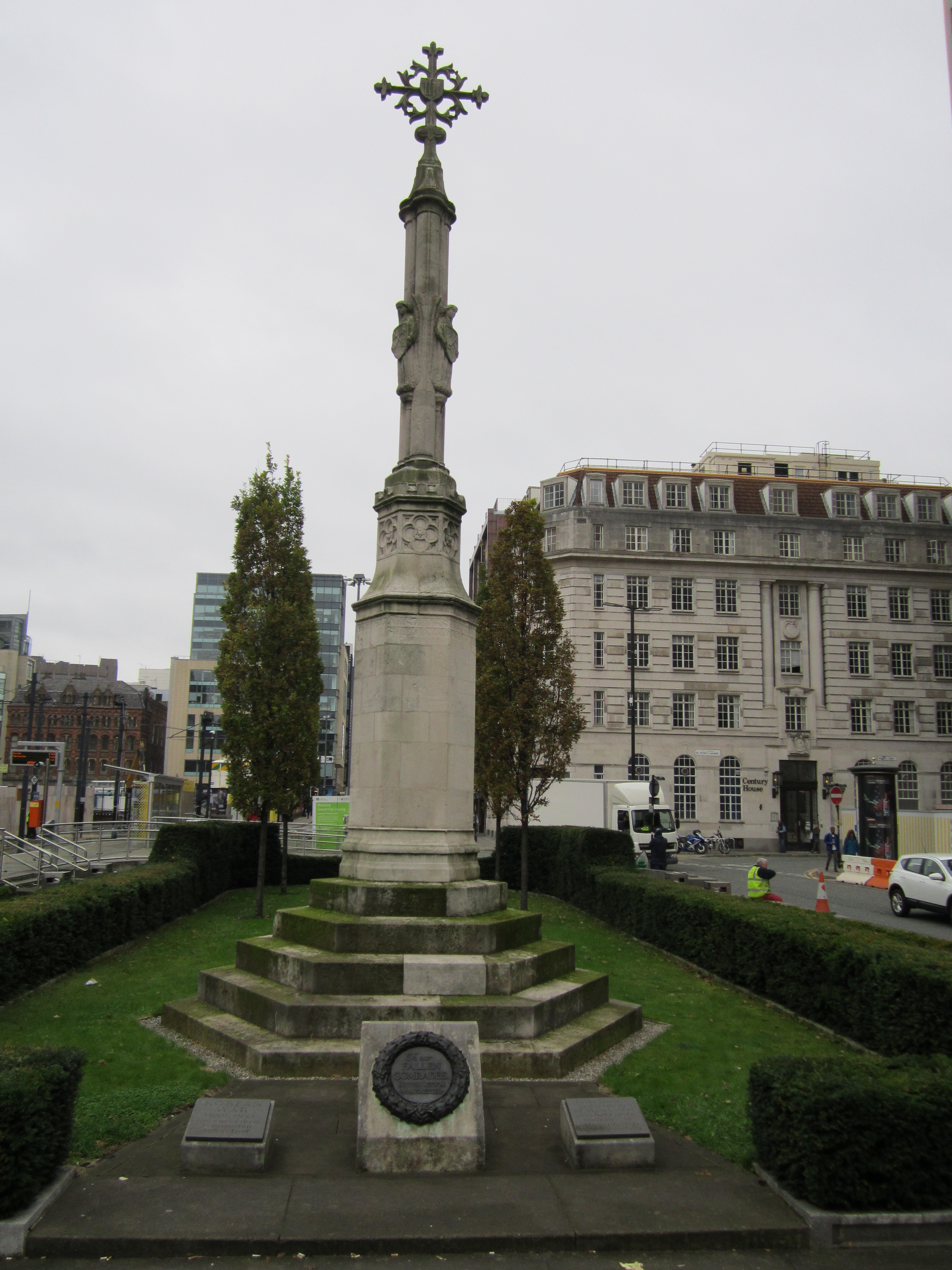
Temple Moore's memorial cross to the former St Peter's Church, which occupied the site intended for the war memorial, surrounded by the post-WWII garden of remembrance

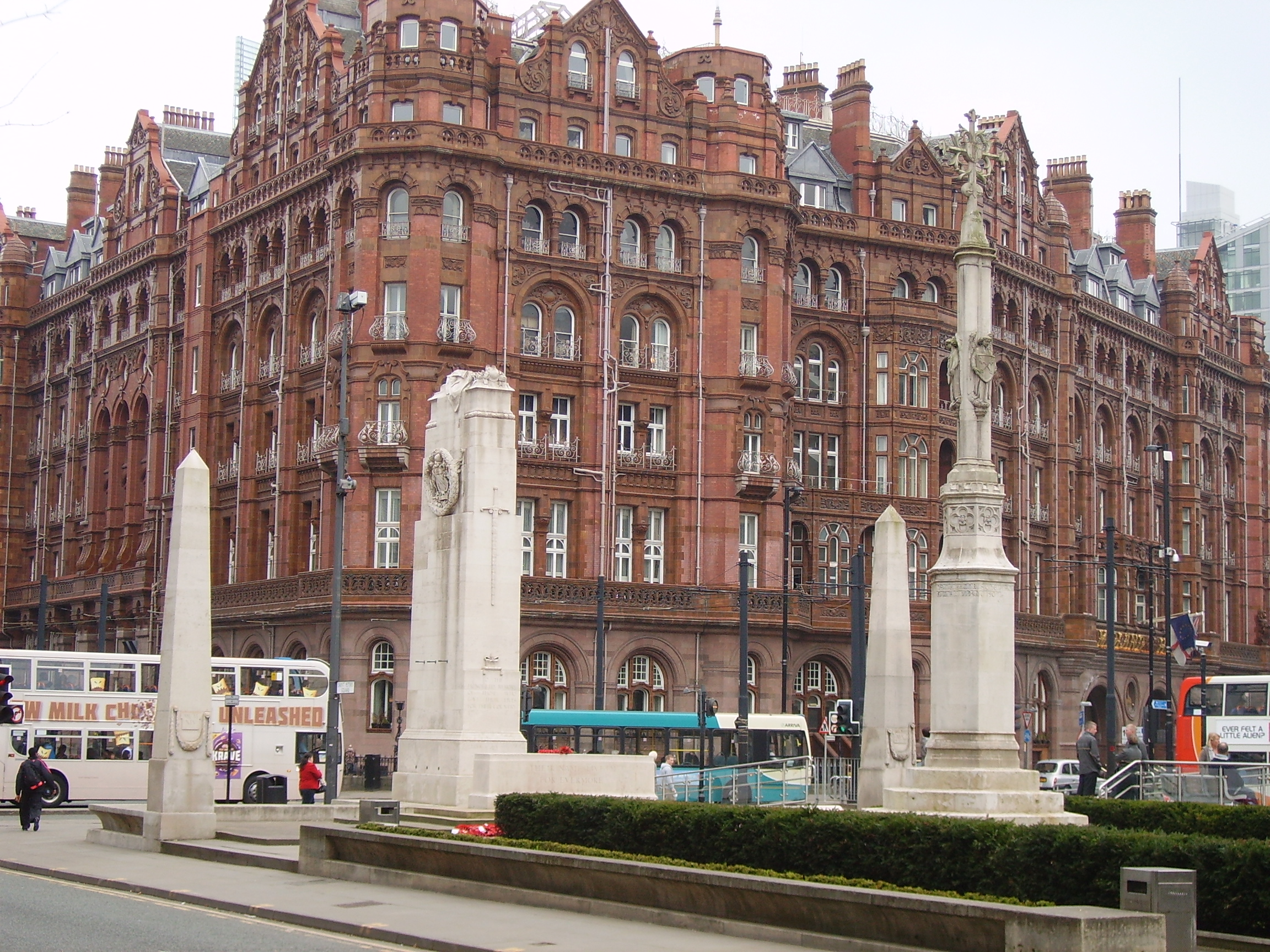
The cenotaph in its pre-2014 "cluttered" location; in the foreground is the cross marking the site of the former St Peter's Church and in the background the Midland Hotel. Power lines and platforms for the Metrolink tram system are visible beyond the garden of remembrance.

St Peter's Square already housed a memorial cross by Temple Moore marking the location of the former St Peter's Church, which had been demolished in 1907. The statutory trustees had agreed with the British Legion in recommending Albert Square as the memorial site; nevertheless the Bishop of Manchester, ex-officio chairman of the trustees, had subsequently indicated approval to relocating the cross and burials from St Peters Square, should this be needed to accommodate the war memorial. A full meeting of the trustees did not, however, endorse him in this. Lutyens provisionally resolved the stand-off by stating that he was happy for the cross to be retained; and the issue was adjourned until after the cenotaph had been erected. Nevertheless, the impracticality of having a cross obscuring the view of the cenotaph for spectators became apparent at the dedication ceremony, and negotiations about relocating cross and burials recommenced; but the trustees remained reluctant and after further discussion Lutyens said he did not object to their remaining. According to Tim Skelton, author of Lutyens and the Great War (2008), "the heated discussions resulted in a compromise that clearly show[ed]" as Moore's cross "severely impinged on the setting of the memorial and appear[ed] to be an integral part of it".

Despite the war memorial committee's promise that local labour would be used, the monument was built by Nine Elms Stone Masonry Works of London, resulting in a sense of betrayal in the local community. Having cost £6,940, it was unveiled on 12 July 1924 by Edward Stanley, 17th Earl of Derby. Derby's family had been involved in politics for generations, and he had held various public offices during the war including Secretary of State for War. He was assisted by Mrs Bingle, a local woman from Rylance Street, Ancoats, who lost three sons in the war. Two years earlier, Lord Derby had unveiled Lutyens' Rochdale Cenotaph, 10 miles (16 km) away. Mrs Bingle represented "the mothers and wives of Manchester who had made sacrifices greater than life itself". She wore the eight medals awarded to her sons: Sergeant Ernest Bingle aged 34 and Gunner Charles Bingle aged 27 of the Royal Garrison Artillery, and Corporal Nelson Bingle aged 21 of the Royal Engineers. All were killed in 1918—Nelson in March and Ernest and Charles in May.

The unveiling ceremony at Manchester took place in front of a large crowd and a guard of honour from the Manchester Regiment and ex-servicemen. The service was led by the Dean of Manchester, the Very Reverend Gough McCormick, and the Baptist minister Reverend John Edward Roberts of Union Chapel on Oxford Road. Several dignitaries gave speeches including the lord mayor and Lord Derby, who remarked that the memorial was not only a tribute to the dead but a warning as to the cost of war. After the unveiling, a procession of women laid flowers around the base of the memorial. The remainder of the £10,000 raised by the war memorial committee was used to provide hospital beds for ex-servicemen and their families. The controversies that arose during the memorial's gestation largely disappeared after its unveiling; the Manchester City News praised the design for its "simplicity of forms and rhythmic beauty of proportion".

A marble plaque, added nearby and dedicated to "OUR ITALIAN COMRADES 1915–1918", was removed during the Second World War. In 1949, the dates for World War II were added as inscriptions on the obelisks, and the surrounding area was laid out as a garden of remembrance designed by the city architect, L. C. Howitt. The steps and lawns of the garden of remembrance provided space for the Italian memorial plaque to be restored; and over subsequent years, further plaques were added later to commemorate the dead of the Korean War and other later conflicts. Nevertheless, by enclosing cross and cenotaph within a single space, the post-WWII memorial complex conflicted with Lutyens's intention that the cenotaph should be free of explicit religious associations.

=== Relocation ===
The suitability of St Peter's Square re-emerged in 1925 during discussions about the proposed art gallery and consideration was given to moving the cenotaph to Piccadilly. Over the following century the square itself changed radically. In 1924 the square was small and, apart from the Midland Hotel most of the surrounding buildings were no more than four stories high; but then an entire block on the north side was cleared in the 1930s for the construction behind it of the Manchester Central Library; and then further blocks to the northeast were cleared in 1980 to open the square to the Manchester Town Hall Extension and the Collier Street facade of Manchester Town Hall. From 1992 St Peter's Square became the location of one of the main city-centre stops for Manchester's Metrolink tram system, such that stanchions and overhead power lines increasingly intruded on the cenotaph, and platforms abutted directly onto the low wall around the post-WWII garden of remembrance. In March 2011, Manchester City Council began a public consultation on moving the cenotaph to an alternative site (within the 1980 extension of the square), to allow for further expansion of the tram network. The plans had a mixed reception. Some objections were made by the public but there was support from veterans, church, and heritage groups. The relocation was approved in 2012, and in January 2014 the cenotaph was dismantled, cleaned and restored. The burial crypts were to remain beneath the new tram-lines, so were provided with a concrete lid, while the memorial cross, also cleaned and restored, was returned to its original position above the crypts. In 2014 the cenotaph was reconstructed in a new memorial garden on the opposite side of the square aligned with Manchester Town Hall's southern entrance. The city council commissioned conservation architects Stephen Levrant Heritage Architecture to manage the relocation and design the new setting, which places the cenotaph, obelisks and stone on a plinth in an oval surrounded by a low wall. The garden opened to the public in September 2014. The cenotaph was damaged in the first week when skateboarders began using the area as a skatepark. Repair work costing £4,000 started shortly afterwards, and extra security measures (including 24-hour CCTV) were put in place.

Dismantling and relocation of the Cenotaph, 2014

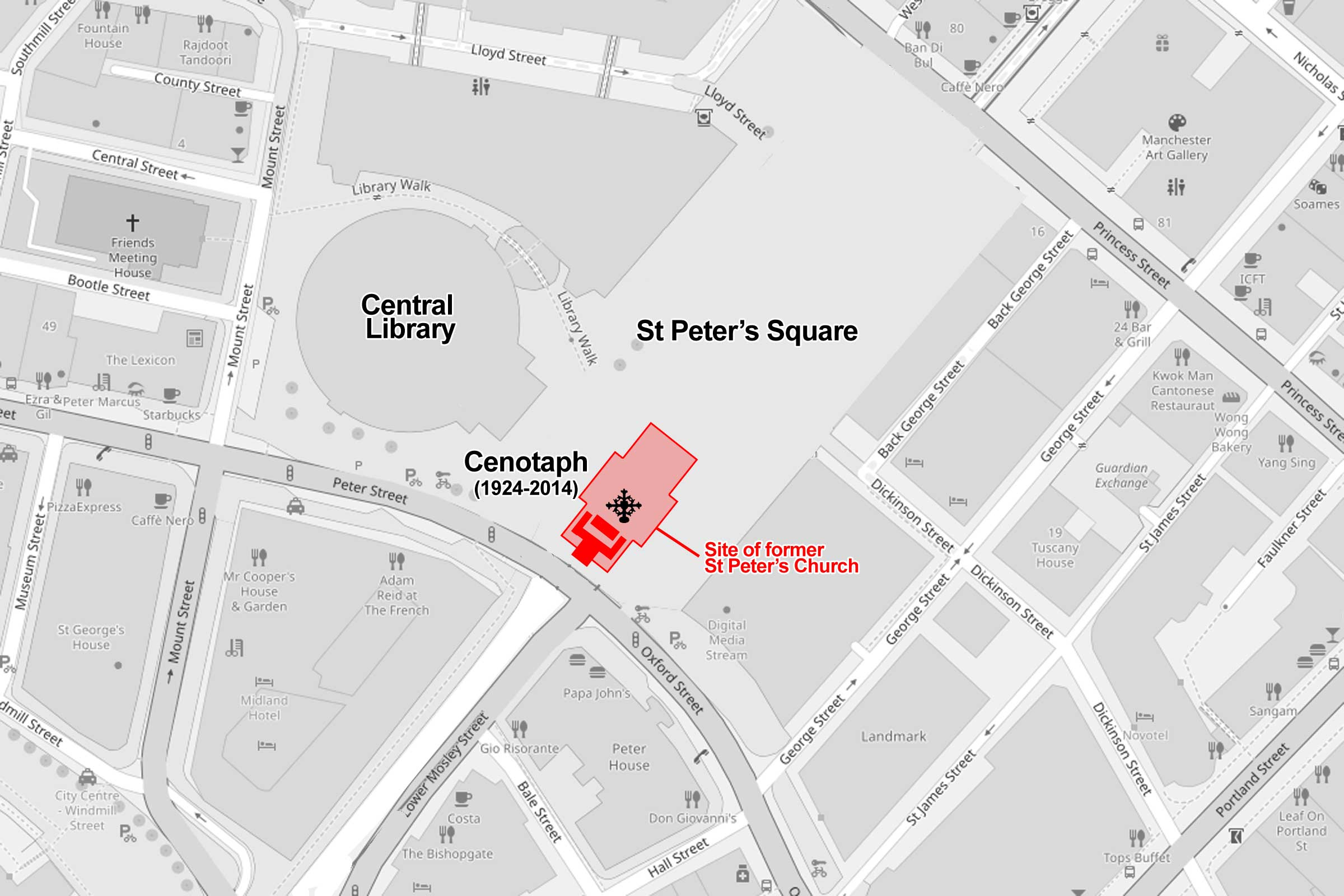
Original location on the site of St Peter's Church

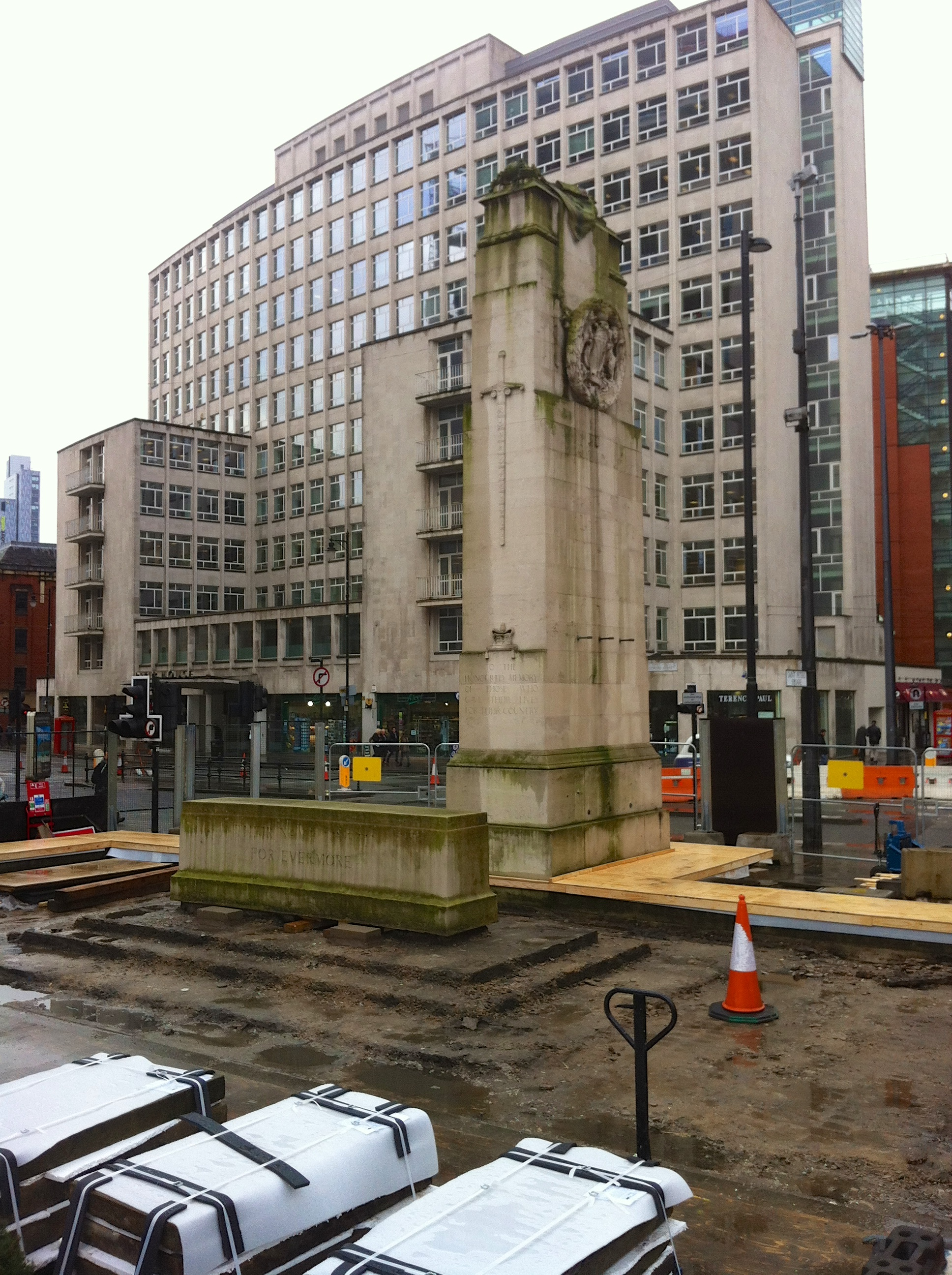

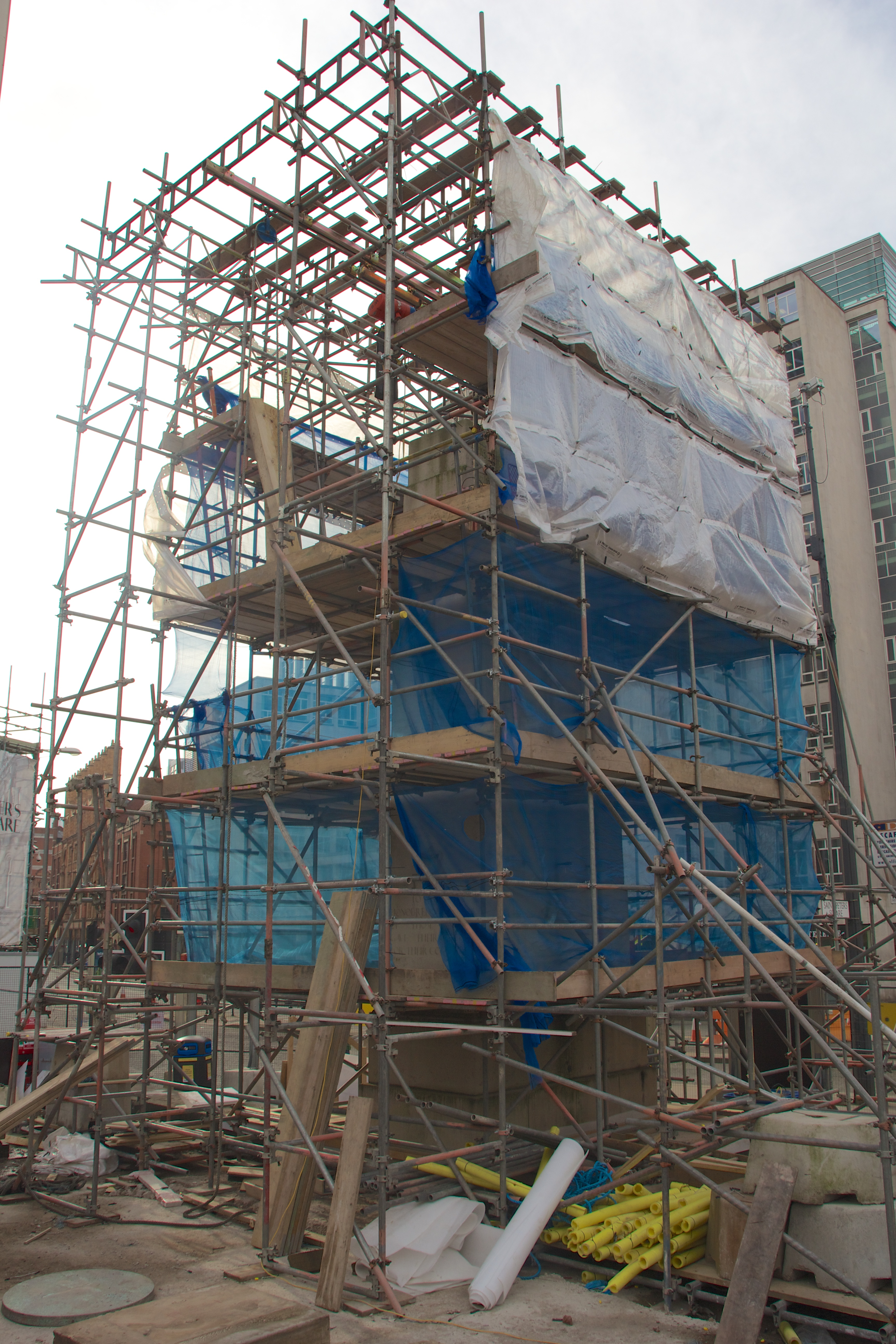

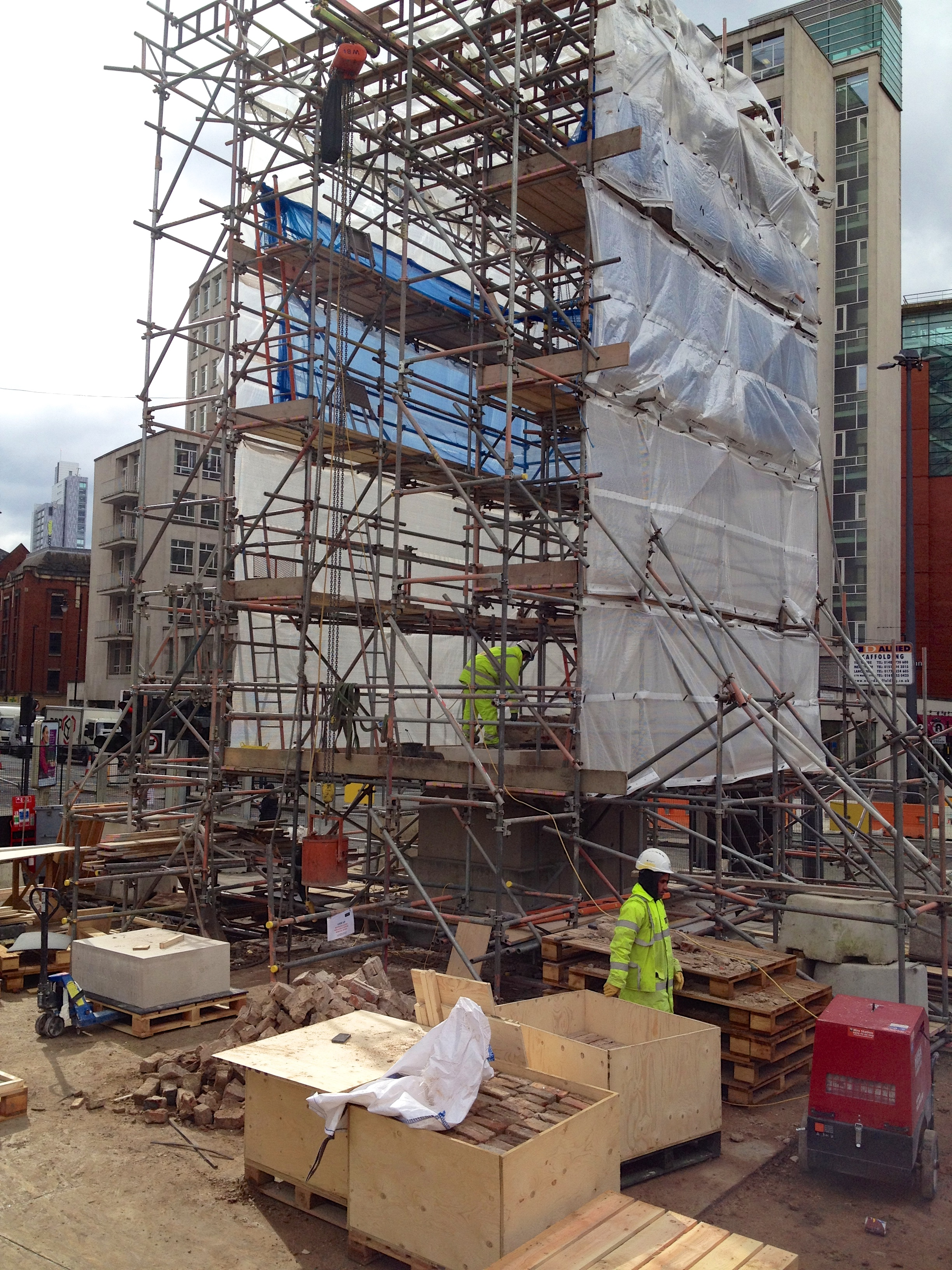

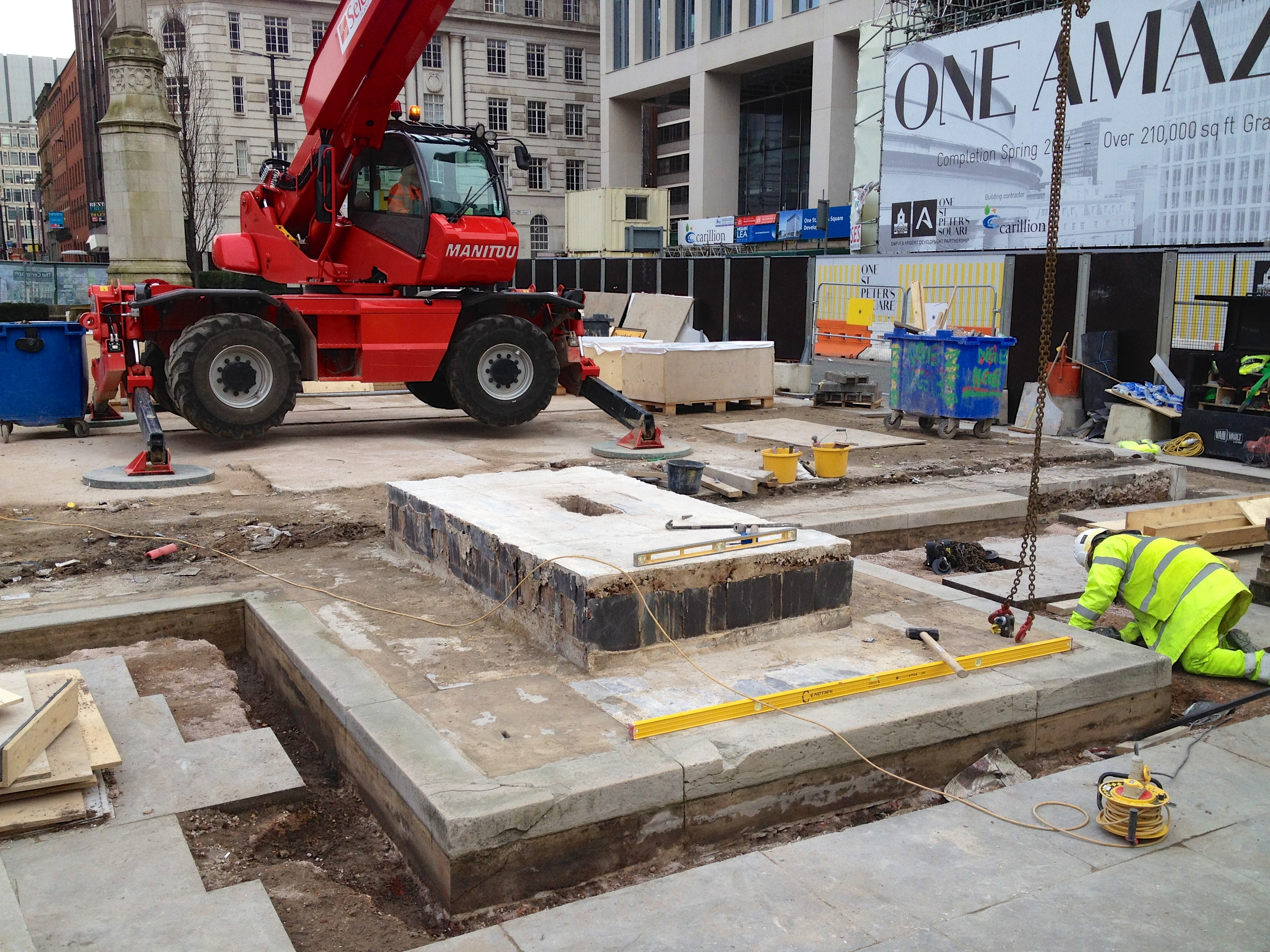

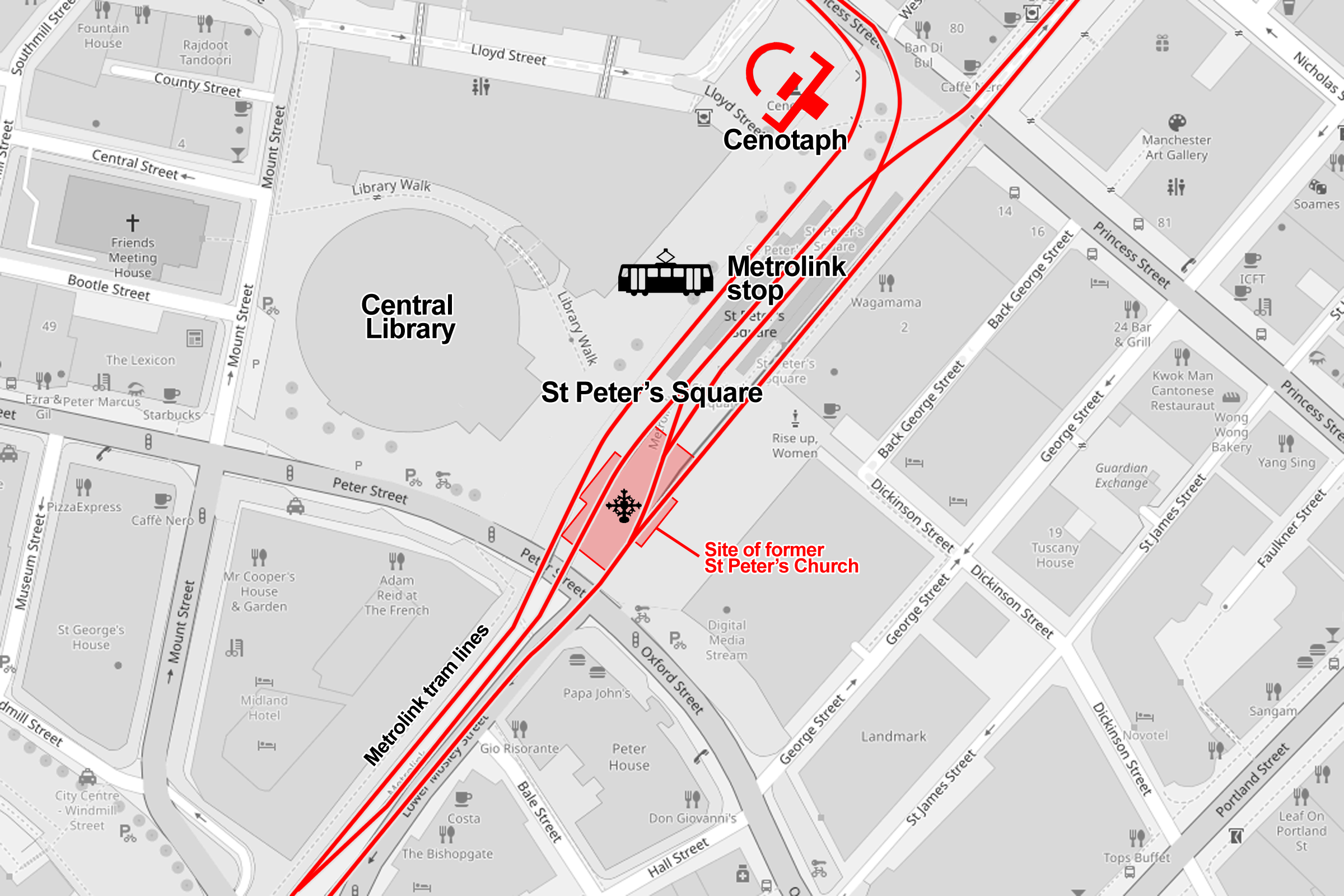
New location next to the Town Hall

The cenotaph was designated a grade II listed structure on 12 February 1985. Listed status provides legal protection from demolition or modification; grade II is applied to about 92% of listed buildings of "special interest, warranting every effort to preserve them". It was upgraded in 1994 to grade II*, which is reserved for "particularly important buildings of more than special interest" and applies to about 5.5% of listed buildings. In November 2015, as part of commemorations for the centenary of the First World War, Manchester Cenotaph was recognised as part of the "national collection" of Lutyens' war memorials.

== See also ==
- Grade II* listed buildings in Greater Manchester
- Grade II* listed war memorials in England
- Listed buildings in Manchester-M2
