= Richard Harding Watt =

English designer

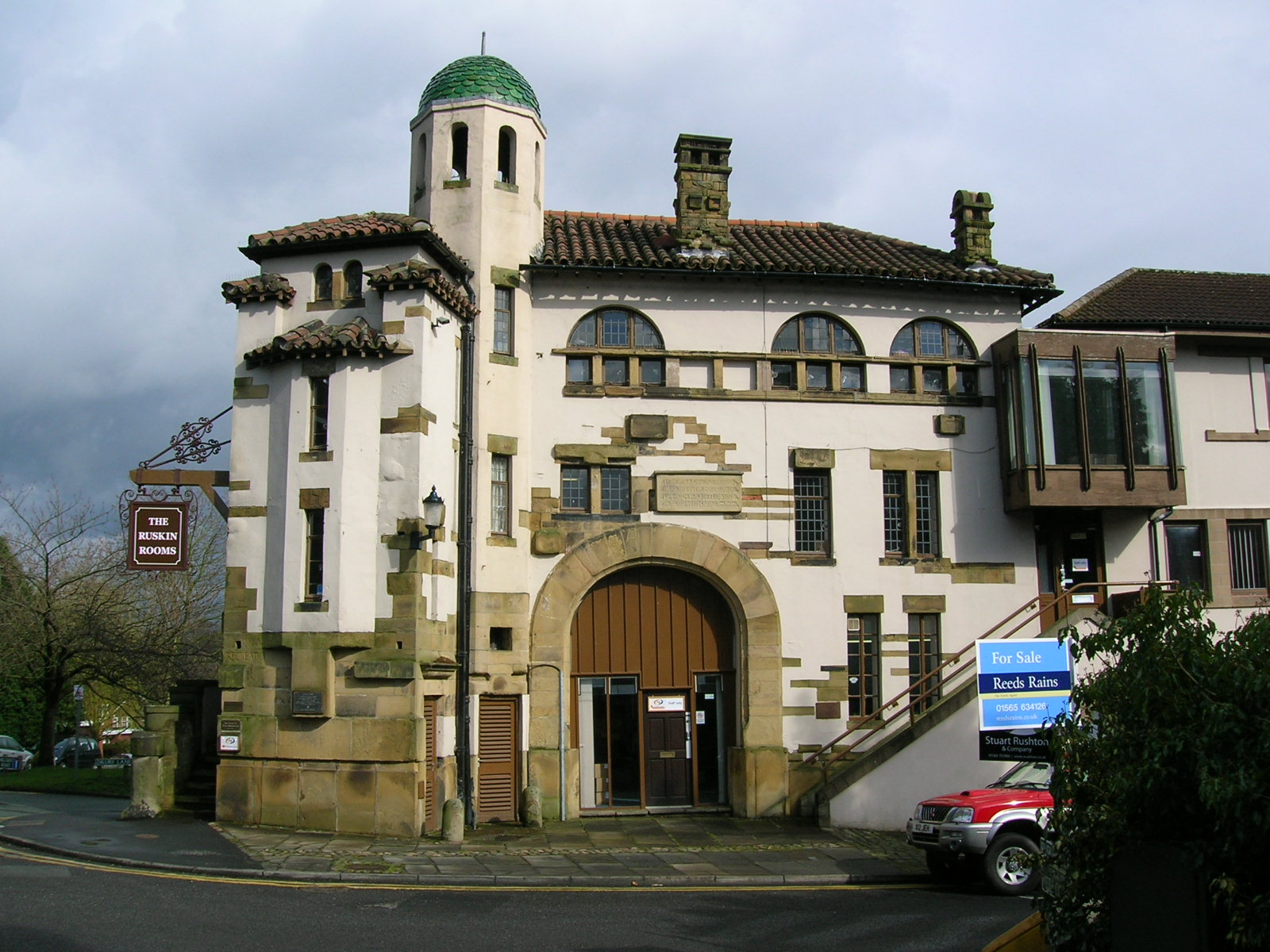
Ruskin Rooms

Richard Harding Watt (1842–1913) was an English designer who worked with four professional architects to create large houses and associated buildings in the town of Knutsford, Cheshire.

== Biography ==
Watt was born, apparently out of wedlock, to Richard Harding Hethorn (c. 1816–53) and Zillah Watt on 27 August 1842 and was baptised in St John's Church, Deansgate, Manchester, on 17 November of that year, contrary to claims that he was an orphan of Boer parents. In later life, Watt travelled widely and sketched many buildings. In 1864 he travelled to Australia, where his sketches were published in nine volumes. Returning to England, he planned to train as an art teacher, but instead became a glove merchant in Manchester.

== Practice ==
Watt designed some buildings himself, but usually used four architects to execute his plans, namely Walter Aston, John Brooke, Harry S. Fairhurst, and William Longworth. In 1898 Watt bought a tannery on Drury Lane, to the north of the town centre and, with Fairhurst, adapted the buildings into a laundry and cottages. One of Watt's other buildings. the King's Coffee House and Gaskell Memorial Tower, is located in the centre of the town, and a series of more eccentric houses were built between 1900 and 1907 on Legh Road, to the southeast of the town. Watt lived in one of these, The Round House, until 1913.

== Appraisal ==
The author of a citation in the National Heritage List for England describes the Knutsford houses as "a series of eccentric buildings which are of considerable interest and importance" which "transformed the townscape of Knutsford". The architectural historians Nikolaus Pevsner and Edward Hubbard state that "any Royal Fine Art Commission now would veto such monstrous desecration of a small and pleasant country town". Yet they accept that younger critics might dub him "the Gaudí of England". They describe his motifs as a mixture of Classical, Italianate, Byzantine, and "Unprecedented", and comment on his liking for towers with a jagged outline, domes, and random fenestration. The authors of the later edition of the Buildings of England series refer to "his penchant for scrounging bits of demolished buildings and putting them together in novel and exotic-looking ways". However they express the opinion that some of his works equate to those of Edgar Wood and Charles Rennie Mackintosh.

== See also ==
- List of works by Richard Harding Watt
- Watt, Richard Harding. (First) 1905 `Sketchers' Note Book, 1905, State Library of New South Wales, PXA 1075
- Watt, Richard Harding. Sketches, Richard Harding Watt, 1858, 1. Australia, Greece, Grecian Archipelago & Balkan Peninsula (1864 & 1881) 2. England, North Midland & South (1858–1895) 3. Lancashire, Cheshire, Cumberland & Westmoreland (1858–1894) 4. Scotland, Ireland & Wales (1859–1893) 5. France & Corsica, Switzerland, Spain, Gibraltar & Algeria (1868–1891) 6. Norway, Sweden, Denmark, Germany & Austria (1872–1895) 7. Canada & the United States (1874 & 1884) 8. Palestine (1876 & 1881) 9. Egypt and India (1876–1890), State Library of New South Wales, PX*D 347–355
