= Gaskell Memorial Tower and King's Coffee House =

Building in Knutsford, Cheshire, England

Coordinates: 53.30408°N 2.37290°W

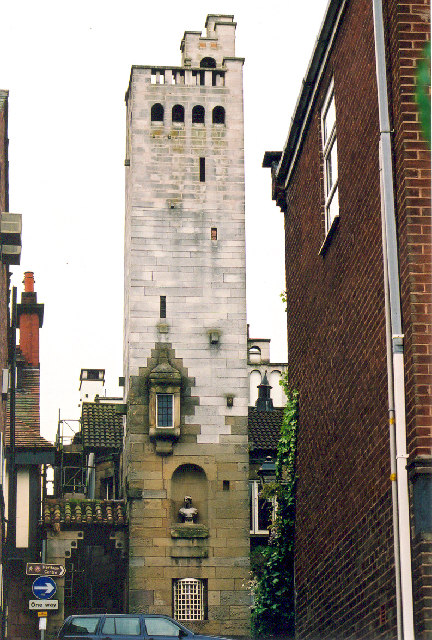
Elizabeth Gaskell Memorial Tower

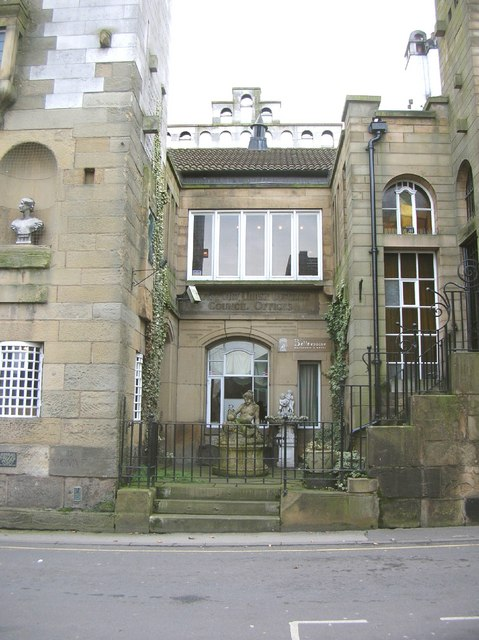
Courtyard between the tower (on the left) and the former coffee house (on the right)

The Gaskell Memorial Tower and King's Coffee House are in King Street, Knutsford, Cheshire, England. As originally built, it had the triple function of being council offices, a coffee house, and a memorial to the novelist Elizabeth Gaskell, a former resident of the town who is often known as Mrs Gaskell. The building was designed by Richard Harding Watt with assistance from W. Longworth, and was opened in 1907. Its design incorporates features of many styles of architecture, and has not been praised by all critics. Incorporated on the tower are two depictions of Mrs Gaskell, a stone bust and a bronze relief. The building is recorded in the National Heritage List for England as a designated Grade II* listed building. The building is owned by Knutsford Town Council and is currently unused.

== History ==
The building was erected between 1904 and 1907 and was designed by Richard Harding Watt with assistance from W. Longworth. Its initial function was to provide council offices, a coffee house with a ballroom, and a memorial to Mrs Gaskell. Watt was a local businessman and philanthropist who had studied drawing but was not a qualified architect. He had designed a number of houses and other buildings in the Knutsford area, and used other draughtsmen and architects to produce the drawing for the works he designed. The coffee house, known as the King's Coffee House, in addition to providing food and drink, also supplied newspapers and journals. Watt's intention was "to attract the inhabitants of Knutsford away from the local inns and public houses". Watt also wanted to commemorate the novelist Mrs Gaskell, who had lived in Knutsford, and who had based some of her works on the town, in particular the novel Cranford. The building was opened on 23 March 1907 in the presence of one of Mrs Gaskell's grandsons. A plaque was placed on the tower on 29 September 1960 on the occasion of the 150th anniversary of Mrs Gaskell's birth. From 1973 to 2019 the building housed a restaurant, part-founded by the footballer George Best. In 2023 Knutsford Town Council invited interested parties to submit proposals for the future use of the unused building.

== Description ==
=== Former coffee house ===
The building is constructed mainly in sandstone, with the upper part of the tower in Portland stone. Its architectural style is eclectic, being mainly Italianate, with Arts and Crafts features. Nikolaus Pevsner placed it as "a parallel to Barcelona at the same time", and thought that some motifs might be Byzantine. The main block is the former coffee house, which is in two storeys. The entrance is on the right through a recessed porch, with an octagonal column, above which is an inscribed stone. To the left of the porch is a large oriel window, and in the upper floor are three windows and a stepped parapet. On the left of this is a square tower with a small recessed bow window, above which is a larger window divided by a large transom. On top of the tower is a domed lantern. On the left side of the tower is an external staircase, and a tall round-headed window. Between the main block and the memorial tower, the building in recessed, forming a small courtyard. At the rear of the building is a pair of large Doric columns which had been moved from St Peter's Church, Manchester, and nearby are the wheels that transported them.

=== Memorial tower ===
The tower has a square plan, it is about 21 metres (69 ft) high, and 3 metres (10 ft) on each side. It has recessed bow windows on three sides around the bottom. Above the window on the side facing King Street is a stone bust in a niche, and on the right face is a bronze relief, both of which depict Mrs Gaskell. At a higher level than the bust is an offset oriel window, and near the top of the tower are randomly projecting blocks. Near the summit of the tower is an arcade of windows. At the top is an open parapet and turret-like projections. The bust on the King Street face is a copy of a marble bust made in 1897 by Hamo Thornycroft, which is itself a copy of a plaster bust by David Dunbar, which was executed in about 1830–31. This was not present at the formal opening, but was in place by 1913. The sculptor of the relief was Achille d'Orsi. In 1898 Watt had placed it on the front of Knutsford post office, and it was later moved to the tower.

On the right side of the tower, above the bronze relief, is carved a list of Mrs Gaskell's novels. Below the relief is carved:

THOUGH HE SLAY ME
YET WILL I TRUST IN HIM (Note: This is a quotation from Job, chapter 13, verse 15.)

On the front of the tower below the bow window is a plaque with an inscription reading:

THIS PLAQUE WAS PLACED
HERE ON THE OCCASION OF
MRS GASKELL'S 150th BIRTH
ANNIVERSARY, SEP 29th 1960
AND TO RECORD THAT THIS
TOWER WAS ERECTED
TO THE MEMORY OF
MRS GASKELL BY
MR RH WATT IN MARCH 1907

== Appraisal ==
The statue was designated as a Grade II* listed building on 18 January 1949. Grade II* is the middle of the three grades of listing designated by English Heritage, and is granted to "particularly important buildings of more than special interest". The architectural historian Nikolaus Pevsner did not know what to make of Watt's works. He described Watt's buildings in Knutsford as a "monstrous desecration of a small and pleasant country town", yet conceded that younger critics might call him the "Gaudí of England". Referring specifically to the tower and former coffee house he criticised its "remorseless imposing of crazy grandeur on poor Knutsford". Later writers have been kinder. Hartwell et al. in the Buildings of England series consider that Watt's houses elsewhere in the town show him to be the equal of Edgar Wood and Mackintosh. Describing the tower and former coffee house they comment that they "may floor the unwary".

== See also ==
- Listed buildings in Knutsford
- Grade II* listed buildings in Cheshire East

== Notes and references ==
Notes

Citations

Sources

- Hartwell, Clare; Hyde, Matthew; Hubbard, Edward; Pevsner, Nikolaus (2011) [1971], Cheshire, The Buildings of England, New Haven and London: Yale University Press, ISBN 978-0-300-17043-6
- Morris, Edward; Roberts, Emma (2012), Public Sculpture of Cheshire and Merseyside (excluding Liverpool), Public Sculpture of Britain, vol. 15, Liverpool: Liverpool University Press, ISBN 978-1-84631-492-6
- Pevsner, Nikolaus; Hubbard, Edward (2003) [1971], Cheshire, The Buildings of England, New Haven and London: Yale University Press, ISBN 0-300-09588-0
- Historic England, "Former Kings Coffee House and Gaskell Memorial Tower, Knutsford (1388360)", National Heritage List for England
- Historic England, Listed Buildings
- National Recording Project, Gaskell Memorial Tower, archived from the original on 1 February 2014
- The Belle Époque, Belle Époque's History, archived from the original on 1 February 2014
